= 2023 Winnipeg National Bank Challenger =

- Date: August 14–19
- Edition: 6th
- Category: ATP Challenger Tour
- Surface: Hard – outdoors
- Location: Winnipeg, Manitoba, Canada

Champions

Singles
- (United Kingdom) Ryan Peniston

Doubles
- (Canada) Gabriel Diallo / (Switzerland) Leandro Riedi
← 2022 ·	Winnipeg Challenger	· 2024 →

The 2023 Winnipeg National Bank Challenger was a professional tennis tournament played on outdoor hard courts. It was the 6th edition of the tournament and part of the 2023 ATP Challenger Tour. It took place in Winnipeg, Manitoba, Canada between August 14 and 19, 2023.

== Singles main-draw entrants ==
=== Seeds ===
Country	Player	Rank^{1}	Seed
GBR	Jack Draper	83	1
BEL	David Goffin	97	2
FRA	Benjamin Bonzi	102	3
GBR	Liam Broady	123	4
ITA	Luca Nardi	126	5
FRA	Arthur Cazaux	128	6
SUI	Dominic Stricker	130	7
CAN	Gabriel Diallo	141	8

- ^{1} Rankings are as of August 7, 2023.

=== Other entrants ===
The following players received wildcards into the singles main draw:

- (Canada) Taha Baadi
- (Canada) Dan Martin
- (Canada) Brayden Schnur

The following player received entry into the singles main draw using a protected ranking:

- (United States) Thai-Son Kwiatkowski

The following players received entry into the singles main draw as alternates:

- (United Kingdom) Billy Harris
- (United States) Christian Harrison
- (United Kingdom) Ryan Peniston

The following players received entry from the qualifying draw:

- (United States) Ulises Blanch
- (Barbados) Darian King
- (United States) Strong Kirchheimer
- (United States) Omni Kumar
- (United States) Aidan Mayo
- (New Zealand) Kiranpal Pannu

== Champions ==
=== Singles ===
- (United Kingdom) Ryan Peniston def. (Switzerland) Leandro Riedi 6–4, 4–6, 6–4.

=== Doubles ===
- (Canada) Gabriel Diallo / (Switzerland) Leandro Riedi def. (Canada) Juan Carlos Aguilar / (Canada) Taha Baadi 6–2, 6–3.
