= 2023 Winnipeg National Bank Challenger – Doubles =

Doubles
- 2023 Winnipeg National Bank Challenger

Final
- Champions: (Canada) Gabriel Diallo (Switzerland) Leandro Riedi
- Runners-up: (Canada) Juan Carlos Aguilar (Canada) Taha Baadi
- Score: 6–2, 6–3

Events
Singles	Doubles
← 2022 ·	Winnipeg Challenger	· 2024 →

Billy Harris and Kelsey Stevenson were the defending champions but lost in the quarterfinals to Gabriel Diallo and Leandro Riedi.

Diallo and Riedi won the title after defeating Juan Carlos Aguilar and Taha Baadi 6–2, 6–3 in the final.

== Seeds ==
1. (Australia) Andrew Harris / (United States) Christian Harrison (semifinals)
2. (Chinese Taipei) Hsu Yu-hsiou / (Japan) Yuta Shimizu (first round)
3. (United States) George Goldhoff / (United States) Vasil Kirkov (first round)
4. (United States) Mac Kiger / (Canada) Benjamin Sigouin (first round)

== Draw ==
=== Key ===
- Q = Qualifier
- WC = Wild card
- LL = Lucky loser
- Alt = Alternate
- ITF = ITF entry
- PR = Protected ranking
- SR = Special ranking
- SE = Special exempt
- JE = Junior exempt
- JR = Junior Accelerator Programme entrant
- CO = College Accelerator Programme entrant
- NG = Next Gen Accelerator Program entrant
- w/o = Walkover
- r = Retired
- d = Defaulted

First round
1	(Australia) A Harris (United States) C Harrison	6	3	[15]
(United Kingdom) S Duncan (United Kingdom) R Peniston	1	6	[13]
(United States) S Kirchheimer (Japan) R Noguchi	4	4
(Japan) T Ito (Japan) S Mochizuki	6	6
4	(United States) M Kiger (Canada) B Sigouin	2	6^{4}
(United States) T-S Kwiatkowski (Luxembourg) C Rodesch	6	7^{7}
WC	(Canada) JC Aguilar (Canada) T Baadi	6	6
WC	(Canada) C Harper (Canada) B Schnur	3	4
(Canada) J Boulais (Japan) J Trotter	6	6^{0}	[4]
(France) E Couacaud (Switzerland) D Stricker	4	7^{7}	[10]
(Italy) M Bellucci (Italy) L Nardi	6	6
3	(United States) G Goldhoff (United States) V Kirkov	2	4
(United Kingdom) B Harris (Canada) K Stevenson	6	6
Alt	(Republic of Ireland) O O'Hoisin (United States) J Sheehy	3	4
(Canada) G Diallo (Switzerland) L Riedi	7^{7}	7^{7}
2	(Chinese Taipei) Y-h Hsu (Japan) Y Shimizu	6^{4}	6^{4}

Quarterfinals
1	(Australia) A Harris (United States) C Harrison	7^{7}	6
(Japan) T Ito (Japan) S Mochizuki	6^{2}	2
(United States) T-S Kwiatkowski (Luxembourg) C Rodesch	6	2	[3]
WC	(Canada) JC Aguilar (Canada) T Baadi	1	6	[10]
(France) E Couacaud (Switzerland) D Stricker
(Italy) M Bellucci (Italy) L Nardi	w/o
(United Kingdom) B Harris (Canada) K Stevenson	2	4
(Canada) G Diallo (Switzerland) L Riedi	6	6

Semifinals
1	(Australia) A Harris (United States) C Harrison	2	6^{4}
WC	(Canada) JC Aguilar (Canada) T Baadi	6	7^{7}
(Italy) M Bellucci (Italy) L Nardi
(Canada) G Diallo (Switzerland) L Riedi	w/o

Final
WC	(Canada) JC Aguilar (Canada) T Baadi	2	3
(Canada) G Diallo (Switzerland) L Riedi	6	6
