= Tennis at the 2013 Island Games =

- Date: 14 – 19 July
- Edition: 12th
- Location: William Joell Tennis Stadium, Bermuda

Champions

Men's singles
- Billy Harris (IOM)

Women's singles
- Tyler Smith (BER)

Men's doubles
- Scott Clayton & James Connelly (Jersey)

Women's doubles
- Erika Bove & Tyler Smith (BER)

Mixed doubles
- Billy Harris & Laura Feely (IOM)

Men's team
- Guernsey

Women's team
- Bermuda
| ← 2011 · | Island Games | · 2015 → |

Tennis, for the 2013 Island Games, took place at the William Joell Tennis Stadium in Pembroke Parish, Bermuda. Matches were played out from 14 to 19 July 2013.

== Medal table ==
* Host nation (Bermuda)

| Rank | Nation | Gold | Silver | Bronze | Total |
|---|---|---|---|---|---|
| 1 | Bermuda* | 3 | 1 | 3 | 7 |
| 2 | Isle of Man | 2 | 3 | 1 | 6 |
| 3 | Guernsey | 1 | 1 | 2 | 4 |
| 4 | Jersey | 1 | 1 | 1 | 3 |
| 5 | Menorca | 0 | 1 | 3 | 4 |
| 6 | Gibraltar | 0 | 0 | 2 | 2 |
| 6 | Åland | 0 | 0 | 2 | 2 |
| Totals (7 entries) | | 7 | 7 | 14 | 28 |

Source: Bermuda 2013 IG Tennis Medal Tally

== Events ==
- 2013 IG Tennis Results Page

| Event | Gold | Silver | Bronze |
|---|---|---|---|
| Men's singles | Billy Harris (IOM) | Dominic McLuskey (GGY) | Patrick Ogier (GGY) |
| Men's singles | Billy Harris (IOM) | Dominic McLuskey (GGY) | James Connelly (Jersey) |
| Women's singles | Tyler Smith (BER) | Laura Feely (IOM) | Laura Moreno (Menorca) |
| Women's singles | Tyler Smith (BER) | Laura Feely (IOM) | Sandra Moll (Menorca) |
| Men's doubles | Jersey; Scott Clayton; James Connelly | Bermuda; David Thomas; Neal Towlson | Bermuda; Jenson Bascome; Gavin Manders |
| Men's doubles | Jersey; Scott Clayton; James Connelly | Bermuda; David Thomas; Neal Towlson | Guernsey; Dominic McLuskey; Patrick Ogier |
| Women's doubles | Bermuda; Erika Bove; Tyler Smith | Isle of Man; Karen Faragher; Katie Tinkler | Bermuda; Jacklyn Lambert; Tara Lambert |
| Women's doubles | Bermuda; Erika Bove; Tyler Smith | Isle of Man; Karen Faragher; Katie Tinkler | Åland Islands; Pauline Nordlund; Malin Ringbom |
| Mixed doubles | Isle of Man; Laura Feely; Billy Harris | Isle of Man; Marc Chinn; Karen Faragher | Gibraltar; Johann Valverde; Lee Whitwell |
| Mixed doubles | Isle of Man; Laura Feely; Billy Harris | Isle of Man; Marc Chinn; Karen Faragher | Åland Islands; Andreas Nilsson; Malin Ringbom |
| Men's team | Guernsey | Jersey | Bermuda |
| Men's team | Guernsey | Jersey | Menorca |
| Women's team | Bermuda | Menorca | Gibraltar |
| Women's team | Bermuda | Menorca | Isle of Man |
