= 2019 Winnipeg National Bank Challenger – Doubles =

Doubles
- 2019 Winnipeg National Bank Challenger

Final
- Champions: (Barbados) Darian King (Canada) Peter Polansky
- Runners-up: (United States) Hunter Reese (Canada) Adil Shamasdin
- Score: 7–6^{(10–8)}, 6–3

Events
Singles	Doubles
← 2018 ·	Winnipeg Challenger	· 2022 →

Marc-Andrea Hüsler and Sem Verbeek were the defending champions but chose not to defend their title.

Darian King and Peter Polansky won the title after defeating Hunter Reese and Adil Shamasdin 7–6^{(10–8)}, 6–3 in the final.

== Seeds ==
1. (United States) Hunter Reese / (Canada) Adil Shamasdin (final)
2. (United States) John Paul Fruttero / (Philippines) Ruben Gonzales (first round)
3. (China) Li Zhe / (Japan) Hiroki Moriya (semifinals)
4. (Barbados) Darian King / (Canada) Peter Polansky (champions)

== Draw ==
=== Key ===
- Q = Qualifier
- WC = Wild card
- LL = Lucky loser
- Alt = Alternate
- SE = Special exempt
- PR = Protected ranking
- ITF = ITF entry
- JE = Junior exempt
- w/o = Walkover
- r = Retired
- d = Defaulted
- SR = Special ranking

First round
1	(United States) H Reese (Canada) A Shamasdin	6	2	[10]
ITF	(United Kingdom) B Klein (Chile) A Tabilo	4	6	[8]
(United States) N Pasha (United States) M Schnur	6	4	[3]
(Chile) MT Barrios Vera (Brazil) J Menezes	4	6	[10]
3	(China) Z Li (Japan) H Moriya	6	7^{7}
(Japan) T Matsui (Japan) K Uchida	3	6^{3}
(Croatia) B Gojo (Turkey) C İlkel	6	6^{1}	[5]
ITF	(Australia) Jacob Grills (Japan) Shintaro Imai	1	7^{7}	[10]
WC	(Canada) J Boulais (Canada) Joshua Peck	6	6
WC	(Canada) JM Lin (Canada) B Sigouin	3	1
(France) E Couacaud (Australia) A Harris	4	6^{2}
4	(Barbados) D King (Canada) P Polansky	6	7^{7}
(Mexico) H Hach Verdugo (United States) D Novikov	6	7
(United States) M Cressy (Portugal) B Saraiva	3	5
WC	(Canada) G Diallo (Canada) Nicaise Muamba	3	6	[11]
2	(United States) JP Fruttero (Philippines) R Gonzales	6	3	[9]

Quarterfinals
1	(United States) H Reese (Canada) A Shamasdin	4	7^{9}	[10]
(Chile) MT Barrios Vera (Brazil) J Menezes	6	6^{7}	[6]
3	(China) Z Li (Japan) H Moriya	6	4	[10]
ITF	(Australia) J Grills (Japan) S Imai	2	6	[7]
WC	(Canada) J Boulais (Canada) J Peck	2	2
4	(Barbados) D King (Canada) P Polansky	6	6
(Mexico) H Hach Verdugo (United States) D Novikov	6	7^{8}
WC	(Canada) G Diallo (Canada) N Muamba	3	6^{6}

Semifinals
1	(United States) H Reese (Canada) A Shamasdin	6	6
3	(China) Z Li (Japan) H Moriya	3	2
4	(Barbados) D King (Canada) P Polansky	7	7^{7}
(Mexico) H Hach Verdugo (United States) D Novikov	5	6^{4}

Final
1	(United States) H Reese (Canada) A Shamasdin	6^{8}	3
4	(Barbados) D King (Canada) P Polansky	7^{10}	6
