= 2025 Winnipeg National Bank Challenger – Doubles =

Doubles
- 2025 Winnipeg National Bank Challenger

Final
- Champions: (United States) Keshav Chopra (United States) Andres Martin
- Runners-up: (Japan) Naoki Nakagawa (South Africa) Kris van Wyk
- Score: 7–6^{(7–2)}, 3–6, [10–3]

Events
Singles	Doubles
← 2024 ·	Winnipeg National Bank Challenger	· 2026 →

Christian Harrison and Cannon Kingsley were the defending champions but chose not to defend their title.

Keshav Chopra and Andres Martin won the title after defeating Naoki Nakagawa and Kris van Wyk 7–6^{(7–2)}, 3–6, [10–3] in the final.

== Seeds ==
1. (Ecuador) Andrés Andrade / (Canada) Liam Draxl (quarterfinals, withdrew)
2. (Australia) Kody Pearson / (Japan) Yuta Shimizu (quarterfinals)
3. (Japan) Masamichi Imamura / (Japan) Rio Noguchi (semifinals)
4. (Chinese Taipei) Hsu Yu-hsiou / (Chinese Taipei) Huang Tsung-hao (first round)

== Draw ==
Key

- Q = Qualifier
- WC = Wild card
- LL = Lucky loser
- Alt = Alternate
- ITF = ITF entry
- PR = Protected ranking
- SR = Special ranking
- SE = Special exempt
- JE = Junior exempt
- JR = Junior Accelerator Programme entrant
- CO = College Accelerator Programme entrant
- NG = Next Gen Accelerator Program entrant
- w/o = Walkover
- r = Retired
- d = Defaulted

=== Draw ===
First round
1	(Ecuador) A Andrade (Canada) L Draxl	6	6
(United States) S Kirchheimer (Chinese Taipei) T-l Wu	3	3
(Costa Rica) J Flores (United States) Christian Langmo	6	3	[8]
WC	(Canada) Benjamin Thomas George (Canada) Alvin Nicholas Tudorica	3	6	[10]
4	(Chinese Taipei) Y-h Hsu (Chinese Taipei) T-h Huang	6^{6}	4
(United States) K Chopra (United States) A Martin	7^{8}	6
(United States) G Johns (Japan) Kenta Miyoshi	4	4
(United Kingdom) P Jubb (Colombia) N Mejía	6	6
(Australia) M Bouzige (United States) Andre Ilagan	0	6	[10]
(Antigua and Barbuda) J Maginley (United States) A Perez	6	4	[7]
(Japan) Ryuki Matsuda (Japan) N Tajima	3	4
3	(Japan) M Imamura (Japan) R Noguchi	6	6
(Japan) N Nakagawa (South Africa) Kris van Wyk	6^{5}	6	[10]
WC	(Canada) Mikael Arseneault (Canada) N Arseneault	7^{7}	3	[8]
(Czech Republic) M Gengel (Canada) K Stevenson	6	2	[8]
2	(Australia) K Pearson (Japan) Y Shimizu	4	6	[10]

Quarterfinals
1	(Ecuador) A Andrade (Canada) L Draxl
WC	(Canada) BT George (Canada) AN Tudorica	w/o
(United States) K Chopra (United States) A Martin	w/o
(United Kingdom) P Jubb (Colombia) N Mejía
(Australia) M Bouzige (United States) A Ilagan	3	6	[2]
3	(Japan) M Imamura (Japan) R Noguchi	6	4	[10]
(Japan) N Nakagawa (South Africa) K van Wyk	7	6
2	(Australia) K Pearson (Japan) Y Shimizu	5	4

Semifinals
WC	(Canada) BT George (Canada) AN Tudorica	3	7^{7}	[7]
(United States) K Chopra (United States) A Martin	6	6^{5}	[10]
3	(Japan) M Imamura (Japan) R Noguchi	5	4
(Japan) N Nakagawa (South Africa) K van Wyk	7	6

Final
(United States) K Chopra (United States) A Martin	7^{7}	3	[10]
(Japan) N Nakagawa (South Africa) K van Wyk	6^{2}	6	[3]
