= 2023 Winnipeg National Bank Challenger – Singles =

Singles
- 2023 Winnipeg National Bank Challenger

Final
- Champion: (United Kingdom) Ryan Peniston
- Runner-up: (Switzerland) Leandro Riedi
- Score: 6–4, 4–6, 6–4

Events
Singles	Doubles
← 2022 ·	Winnipeg Challenger	· 2024 →

Emilio Gómez was the defending champion but chose not to defend his title.

Ryan Peniston won the title after defeating Leandro Riedi 6–4, 4–6, 6–4 in the final.

== Seeds ==
1. (United Kingdom) Jack Draper (quarterfinals)
2. (Belgium) David Goffin (first round)
3. (France) Benjamin Bonzi (second round)
4. (United Kingdom) Liam Broady (semifinals)
5. (Italy) Luca Nardi (second round)
6. (France) Arthur Cazaux (semifinals)
7. (Switzerland) Dominic Stricker (first round)
8. (Canada) Gabriel Diallo (second round)

== Draw ==
=== Key ===
- Q = Qualifier
- WC = Wild card
- LL = Lucky loser
- Alt = Alternate
- ITF = ITF entry
- PR = Protected ranking
- SR = Special ranking
- SE = Special exempt
- JE = Junior exempt
- JR = Junior Accelerator Programme entrant
- CO = College Accelerator Programme entrant
- NG = Next Gen Accelerator Program entrant
- w/o = Walkover
- r = Retired
- d = Defaulted

=== Finals ===
Semifinals
6	(France) Arthur Cazaux	3	6	5
Alt	(United Kingdom) Ryan Peniston	6	2	7
4	(United Kingdom) Liam Broady	2	3
(Switzerland) Leandro Riedi	6	6

Final
Alt	(United Kingdom) Ryan Peniston	6	4	6
(Switzerland) Leandro Riedi	4	6	4

=== Top half ===
First round
1	(United Kingdom) J Draper	6	6
(Japan) R Noguchi	2	2
PR	(United States) T-S Kwiatkowski	6	6
(Luxembourg) C Rodesch	0	2
(United States) A Martin	6^{3}	6^{10}
Q	(United States) U Blanch	7^{7}	7^{12}
Q	(New Zealand) K Pannu	3	1
6	(France) A Cazaux	6	6
3	(France) B Bonzi	6	6
(Japan) Y Shimizu	2	4
Q	(Barbados) D King	6	6
WC	(Canada) B Schnur	2	1
WC	(Canada) T Baadi	0	2
Alt	(United Kingdom) R Peniston	6	6
Alt	(United States) C Harrison	7	6
7	(Switzerland) D Stricker	5	1

Second round
1	(United Kingdom) J Draper	6	7^{7}
PR	(United States) T-S Kwiatkowski	4	6^{4}
Q	(United States) U Blanch	3	5
6	(France) A Cazaux	6	7
3	(France) B Bonzi	3	1
Q	(Barbados) D King	6	6
Alt	(United Kingdom) R Peniston	6	6
Alt	(United States) C Harrison	0	2

Quarterfinals
1	(United Kingdom) J Draper	3	3
6	(France) A Cazaux	6	6
Q	(Barbados) D King	0	1
Alt	(United Kingdom) R Peniston	6	6

Semifinals
6	(France) A Cazaux	3	6	5
Alt	(United Kingdom) R Peniston	6	2	7

=== Bottom half ===
First round
5	(Italy) L Nardi	6	6
Q	(United States) A Mayo	4	2
WC	(Canada) D Martin	4	4
Alt	(United Kingdom) B Harris	6	6
(Chinese Taipei) Y-h Hsu	6	6
(Japan) S Mochizuki	3	3
Q	(United States) S Kirchheimer	3	3
4	(United Kingdom) L Broady	6	6
8	(Canada) G Diallo	4	6	7^{8}
(France) E Couacaud	6	2	6^{6}
(Canada) A Galarneau	6^{10}	7^{10}	3
(Italy) M Bellucci	7^{12}	6^{8}	6
(France) H Mayot	6	2	6
Q	(United States) O Kumar	1	6	4
(Switzerland) L Riedi	6	2	6
2	(Belgium) D Goffin	3	6	2

Second round
5	(Italy) L Nardi	4	7	5
Alt	(United Kingdom) B Harris	6	5	7
(Chinese Taipei) Y-h Hsu	6	1	1
4	(United Kingdom) L Broady	1	6	6
8	(Canada) G Diallo	2	3
(Italy) M Bellucci	6	6
(France) H Mayot
(Switzerland) L Riedi	w/o

Quarterfinals
Alt	(United Kingdom) B Harris	6^{5}	4
4	(United Kingdom) L Broady	7^{7}	6
(Italy) M Bellucci	3	6	3
(Switzerland) L Riedi	6	3	6

Semifinals
4	(United Kingdom) L Broady	2	3
(Switzerland) L Riedi	6	6
