= 2016 Winnipeg National Bank Challenger – Women's singles =

2016 Winnipeg National Bank Challenger

Women's singles
- 2016 Winnipeg National Bank Challenger

Final
- Champion: (United States) Francesca Di Lorenzo
- Runner-up: (Canada) Erin Routliffe
- Score: 6–4, 6–1

Events
Singles	men	women
Doubles	men	women
- Winnipeg Challenger

Kristie Ahn was the defending champion, but decided not to participate this year.

Francesca Di Lorenzo won the title, defeating Erin Routliffe 6–4, 6–1 in the final.

== Seeds ==
1. (Israel) Julia Glushko (first round)
2. (Russia) Ksenia Lykina (first round)
3. (United States) Lauren Albanese (second round)
4. (Canada) Carol Zhao (second round)
5. (Australia) Alison Bai (first round)
6. (United States) Ellie Halbauer (second round)
7. (France) Caroline Roméo (first round)
8. (Chinese Taipei) Hsu Chieh-yu (first round)

== Draw ==
Key

- Q = Qualifier
- WC = Wild card
- LL = Lucky loser
- Alt = Alternate
- ITF = ITF entry
- PR = Protected ranking
- SR = Special ranking
- SE = Special exempt
- JE = Junior exempt
- JR = Junior Accelerator Programme entrant
- CO = College Accelerator Programme entrant
- NG = Next Gen Accelerator Program entrant
- w/o = Walkover
- r = Retired
- d = Defaulted

=== Finals ===
Semifinals
Q	(United States) Francesca Di Lorenzo	6	6
(Australia) Olivia Rogowska	4	3
Q	(Canada) Erin Routliffe	6	6
Q	(United States) Ronit Yurovsky	3	2

Final
Q	(United States) Francesca Di Lorenzo	6	6
Q	(Canada) Erin Routliffe	4	1

=== Top half ===
First round
1	(Israel) J Glushko	3	6	4
Q	(United States) J Failla	6	3	6
Q	(United States) F Di Lorenzo	6	6
WC	(Canada) M-A Leduc	1	0
(Canada) C Robillard-Millette	0	4
(United Kingdom) H Dart	6	6
WC	(Canada) B Andreescu	6	7^{7}
7	(France) C Roméo	3	6^{3}
3	(United States) L Albanese	6	6
Q	(Canada) C Leduc	1	4
(Australia) L Cabrera	7^{7}	5	6
Q	(United States) J Aney	6^{3}	7	4
WC	(Canada) I Boulais	4	4
(United Kingdom) K Boulter	6	6
(Australia) O Rogowska	7	6^{2}	6
8	(Chinese Taipei) C-y Hsu	5	7^{7}	3

Second round
Q	(United States) J Failla	2	1
Q	(United States) F Di Lorenzo	6	6
(United Kingdom) H Dart	7^{7}	2	7^{7}
WC	(Canada) B Andreescu	6^{4}	6	6^{3}
3	(United States) L Albanese	4	2
(Australia) L Cabrera	6	6
(United Kingdom) K Boulter	6^{8}	7^{7}	1
(Australia) O Rogowska	7^{10}	6^{4}	6

Quarterfinals
Q	(United States) F Di Lorenzo	6	4
(United Kingdom) H Dart	3	2^{r}
(Australia) L Cabrera	6	2	1
(Australia) O Rogowska	3	6	6

Semifinals
Q	(United States) F Di Lorenzo	6	6
(Australia) O Rogowska	4	3

=== Bottom half ===
First round
6	(United States) E Halbauer	6	6
(United States) L Herring	0	3
Q	(Canada) E Routliffe	6	2
(Hungary) N Totka	2	1^{r}
(Japan) M Ozeki	6	7^{7}
(Canada) P Januskova	2	6^{3}
(United Kingdom) E Webley-Smith	0	3
4/WC	(Canada) C Zhao	6	6
5	(Australia) A Bai	2	0
(Japan) M Imanishi	6	6
Q	(United States) K Smith	0	5
(United States) A Graham	6	7
Q	(United States) K Shaffer	6	6
(France) F Codino	4	1
Q	(United States) R Yurovsky	6	2	7
2	(Russia) K Lykina	3	6	5

Second round
6	(United States) E Halbauer	6	4	2
Q	(Canada) E Routliffe	4	6	6
(Japan) M Ozeki	6	7
4/WC	(Canada) C Zhao	2	5
(Japan) M Imanishi	6	6
(United States) A Graham	3	1
Q	(United States) K Shaffer	2	3
Q	(United States) R Yurovsky	6	6

Quarterfinals
Q	(Canada) E Routliffe	6	6
(Japan) M Ozeki	4	3
(Japan) M Imanishi	4	5
Q	(United States) R Yurovsky	6	7

Semifinals
Q	(Canada) E Routliffe	6	6
Q	(United States) R Yurovsky	3	2
