= 2022 Winnipeg National Bank Challenger – Singles =

Singles
- 2022 Winnipeg National Bank Challenger

Final
- Champion: (Ecuador) Emilio Gómez
- Runner-up: (Canada) Alexis Galarneau
- Score: 6–3, 7–6^{(7–4)}

Events
Singles	Doubles
← 2019 ·	Winnipeg Challenger	· 2023 →

Norbert Gombos was the defending champion but chose not to defend his title.

Emilio Gómez won the title after defeating Alexis Galarneau 6–3, 7–6^{(7–4)} in the final.

== Seeds ==
1. (United Kingdom) Liam Broady (quarterfinals)
2. (Ecuador) Emilio Gómez (champion)
3. (Canada) Vasek Pospisil (first round, retired)
4. (United States) Michael Mmoh (first round)
5. (Japan) Kaichi Uchida (second round)
6. (Chinese Taipei) Wu Tung-lin (second round)
7. (Netherlands) Gijs Brouwer (second round)
8. (Argentina) Genaro Alberto Olivieri (quarterfinals)

== Draw ==
Key

- Q = Qualifier
- WC = Wild card
- LL = Lucky loser
- Alt = Alternate
- ITF = ITF entry
- PR = Protected ranking
- SR = Special ranking
- SE = Special exempt
- JE = Junior exempt
- JR = Junior Accelerator Programme entrant
- CO = College Accelerator Programme entrant
- NG = Next Gen Accelerator Program entrant
- w/o = Walkover
- r = Retired
- d = Defaulted

=== Finals ===
Semifinals
(Canada) Alexis Galarneau	6	7
Q	(United States) Evan Zhu	3	5
(France) Enzo Couacaud	3	4
2	(Ecuador) Emilio Gómez	6	6

Final
(Canada) Alexis Galarneau	3	6^{4}
2	(Ecuador) Emilio Gómez	6	7^{7}

=== Top half ===
First round
1	(United Kingdom) L Broady	7	6
WC	(Canada) Jaden Weekes	5	3
Q	(United States) Z Svajda	6	2	3
Q	(United States) G Nanda	3	6	6
(United States) U Blanch	6	6^{6}	2
(Canada) A Galarneau	4	7^{8}	6
(United States) B Holt	2	7^{7}	3
6	(Chinese Taipei) T-l Wu	6	6^{3}	6
4	(United States) M Mmoh	4	4
Q	(United States) A Ayeni	6	6
(Australia) R Hijikata	3	4
Q	(United Kingdom) K Edmund	6	6
WC	(Canada) L Draxl	6	5	1
Q	(United States) E Zhu	2	7	6
(Ecuador) R Quiroz	1	7^{7}	3
5	(Japan) K Uchida	6	6^{3}	6

Second round
1	(United Kingdom) L Broady	6	6
Q	(United States) G Nanda	3	3
(Canada) A Galarneau	6	7^{7}
6	(Chinese Taipei) T-l Wu	3	6^{5}
Q	(United States) A Ayeni	7^{8}	6
Q	(United Kingdom) K Edmund	6^{6}	2
Q	(United States) E Zhu	6	5	6
5	(Japan) K Uchida	4	7	4

Quarterfinals
1	(United Kingdom) L Broady	6^{5}	7^{7}	3
(Canada) A Galarneau	7^{7}	6^{1}	6
Q	(United States) A Ayeni	6	3	4
Q	(United States) E Zhu	4	6	6

Semifinals
(Canada) A Galarneau	6	7
Q	(United States) E Zhu	3	5

=== Bottom half ===
First round
7	(Netherlands) G Brouwer	6	6
Q	(Canada) JC Aguilar	2	3
(Australia) L Tu	6	7
WC	(Canada) G Diallo	1	5
LL	(Japan) S Shimabukuro	3	6	1
(United Kingdom) A McHugh	6	4	6
(France) E Couacaud	6^{4}	6	4
3	(Canada) V Pospisil	7^{7}	3	0^{r}
8	(Argentina) GA Olivieri	4	6	6
(Japan) S Mochizuki	6	4	0
(Japan) Y Uchiyama	5	3
(United States) A Rybakov	7	6
(Colombia) N Mejía	6	2	7^{7}
(Chinese Taipei) Y-h Hsu	2	6	6^{4}
(United Kingdom) B Harris	3	4
2	(Ecuador) E Gómez	6	6

Second round
7	(Netherlands) G Brouwer	4	2
(Australia) L Tu	6	6
(United Kingdom) A McHugh	2	6	4
(France) E Couacaud	6	3	6
8	(Argentina) GA Olivieri	6	6
(United States) A Rybakov	4	4
(Colombia) N Mejía	3	1
2	(Ecuador) E Gómez	6	6

Quarterfinals
(Australia) L Tu	4	3
(France) E Couacuad	6	6
8	(Argentina) GA Olivieri	4	1
2	(Ecuador) E Gómez	6	6

Semifinals
(France) E Couacuad	3	4
2	(Ecuador) E Gómez	6	6
