= 2024 Winnipeg National Bank Challenger =

- Date: July 8–14
- Edition: 7th
- Category: ATP Challenger Tour
- Surface: Hard – outdoors
- Location: Winnipeg, Manitoba, Canada

Champions

Singles
- (France) Benjamin Bonzi

Doubles
- (United States) Christian Harrison / (United States) Cannon Kingsley
| ← 2023 · | Winnipeg Challenger | · 2025 → |

The 2024 Winnipeg National Bank Challenger was a professional tennis tournament played on outdoor hard courts. It was the 7th edition of the tournament and part of the 2024 ATP Challenger Tour. It took place in Winnipeg, Manitoba, Canada between July 8 and 14, 2024.

== Singles main-draw entrants ==
=== Seeds ===
| Country | Player | Rank^{1} | Seed |
|---|---|---|---|
| USA | J. J. Wolf | 115 | 1 |
| FRA | Térence Atmane | 131 | 2 |
| FRA | Benjamin Bonzi | 150 | 3 |
| ~~USA~~ | ~~Patrick Kypson~~ | ~~157~~ | ~~4~~ |
| CAN | Alexis Galarneau | 169 | 5 |
| AUS | Tristan Schoolkate | 176 | 6 |
| FRA | Hugo Grenier | 183 | 7 |
| KOR | Hong Seong-chan | 184 | 8 |

- ^{1} Rankings are as of July 1, 2024.

=== Other entrants ===
The following players received wildcards into the singles main draw:

- (Canada) Liam Draxl
- (Canada) Vasek Pospisil
- (Canada) Keegan Rice

The following player received entry into the singles main draw as a special exempt:

- (United States) Nishesh Basavareddy

The following players received entry into the singles main draw as alternates:

- (United States) Brandon Holt
- (Japan) Yuta Shimizu

The following players received entry from the qualifying draw:

- (Switzerland) Antoine Bellier
- (Lebanon) Hady Habib
- (Estonia) Mark Lajal
- (United States) Andres Martin
- (United States) Aidan Mayo
- (Japan) James Trotter

The following player received entry as a lucky loser:

- (Colombia) Nicolás Mejía

== Champions ==
=== Singles ===
- (France) Benjamin Bonzi def. (Japan) Sho Shimabukuro 5–7, 6–1, 6–4.

=== Doubles ===
- (United States) Christian Harrison / (United States) Cannon Kingsley def. (Japan) Yuta Shimizu / (Japan) Kaichi Uchida 6–1, 6–4.
