= 2019 Winnipeg National Bank Challenger =

- Date: July 8–14
- Edition: 4th
- Category: ATP Challenger Tour
- Surface: Hard – outdoors
- Location: Winnipeg, Manitoba, Canada
- Venue: Winnipeg Lawn Tennis Club

Champions

Singles
- (Slovakia) Norbert Gombos

Doubles
- (Barbados) Darian King / (Canada) Peter Polansky
- Winnipeg Challenger

The 2019 Winnipeg National Bank Challenger was a professional tennis tournament played on outdoor hard courts. It was the 4th edition of the tournament and part of the 2019 ATP Challenger Tour. It took place in Winnipeg, Manitoba, Canada between July 8 and July 14, 2019.

== Singles main-draw entrants ==
=== Seeds ===
Country	Player	Rank^{1}	Seed
AUS	Bernard Tomic	96	1
FRA	Antoine Hoang	103	2
CAN	Brayden Schnur	112	3
CAN	Peter Polansky	139	4
ISR	Dudi Sela	154	5
SVK	Norbert Gombos	158	6
JPN	Go Soeda	159	7
DEN	Mikael Torpegaard	172	8
BAR	Darian King	190	9
FRA	Maxime Janvier	191	10
FRA	Enzo Couacaud	214	11
AUS	Andrew Harris	220	12
CHN	Li Zhe	230	13
JPN	Kaichi Uchida	237	14
JPN	Hiroki Moriya	253	15
~~CAN~~	~~Filip Peliwo~~	~~260~~	~~16~~

- ^{1} Rankings are as of July 1, 2019.

=== Other entrants ===
The following players received wildcards into the singles main draw:

- (Canada) Justin Boulais
- (Canada) Gabriel Diallo
- (Canada) Chaz Doherty
- (Canada) Jack Mingjie Lin
- (Canada) Nicaise Muamba

The following player received entry into the singles main draw using a protected ranking:

- (Spain) Carlos Gómez-Herrera

The following players received entry into the singles main draw as alternates:

- (Canada) Joshua Peck
- (Portugal) Bernardo Saraiva

The following players received entry into the singles main draw using their ITF World Tennis Ranking:

- (Australia) Jacob Grills
- (Japan) Shintaro Imai
- (Romania) ~~Filip Cristian Jianu~~
- (United States) Strong Kirchheimer
- (United States) Alexander Lebedev
- (Japan) Issei Okamura

The following players received entry from the qualifying draw:

- (Mexico) Hans Hach Verdugo
- (Japan) Toshihide Matsui

The following player received entry as a lucky loser:

- (Canada) Kevin Kylar

== Champions ==
=== Singles ===
- (Slovakia) Norbert Gombos def. (Canada) Brayden Schnur 7–6^{(7–3)}, 6–3.

=== Doubles ===
- (Barbados) Darian King / (Canada) Peter Polansky def. (United States) Hunter Reese / (Canada) Adil Shamasdin 7–6^{(10–8)}, 6–3.
