= 2016 Winnipeg National Bank Challenger =

- Date: July 11–17
- Edition: 1st (men); 4th (women)
- Category: ATP Challenger Tour; ITF Women's Circuit
- Prize money: US$75,000 (men); US$25,000 (women)
- Surface: Hard – outdoors
- Location: Winnipeg, Manitoba, Canada
- Venue: Winnipeg Lawn Tennis Club

Champions

Men's singles
- (Japan) Go Soeda

Women's singles
- (United States) Francesca Di Lorenzo

Men's doubles
- (United States) Mitchell Krueger / (United States) Daniel Nguyen

Women's doubles
- (United States) Francesca Di Lorenzo / (United States) Ronit Yurovsky
- Winnipeg Challenger

The 2016 Winnipeg National Bank Challenger was a professional tennis tournament played on outdoor hard courts. It was the 1st edition, for men, and 4th edition, for women, of the tournament and part of the 2016 ATP Challenger Tour and the 2016 ITF Women's Circuit, offering totals of $75,000, for men, and $25,000, for women, in prize money. It took place in Winnipeg, Manitoba, Canada between July 11 and July 17, 2016.

== Men's singles main-draw entrants ==
=== Seeds ===
Country	Player	Rank^{1}	Seed
USA	Bjorn Fratangelo	112	1
JPN	Yoshihito Nishioka	122	2
USA	Tim Smyczek	125	3
FRA	Vincent Millot	137	4
JPN	Go Soeda	156	5
GER	Peter Gojowczyk	157	6
USA	Frances Tiafoe	167	7
KAZ	Andrey Golubev	208	8

- ^{1} Rankings are as of June 27, 2016

=== Other entrants ===
The following players received wildcards into the singles main draw:

- (Canada) Félix Auger-Aliassime
- (Canada) Kevin Kylar
- (Canada) Brayden Schnur
- (Canada) Benjamin Sigouin

The following player entered the singles main draw with a protected ranking:

- (Slovenia) Blaž Kavčič

The following players received entry from the qualifying draw:

- (Australia) Dayne Kelly
- (Republic of Ireland) James McGee
- (United Kingdom) Cameron Norrie
- (Australia) Aleksandar Vukic

== Women's singles main-draw entrants ==
=== Seeds ===
Country	Player	Rank^{1}	Seed
ISR	Julia Glushko	134	1
RUS	Ksenia Lykina	208	2
USA	Lauren Albanese	279	3
CAN	Carol Zhao	334	4
AUS	Alison Bai	386	5
USA	Ellie Halbauer	399	6
FRA	Caroline Roméo	407	7
TPE	Hsu Chieh-yu	431	8

- ^{1} Rankings are as of June 27, 2016

=== Other entrants ===
The following players received wildcards into the singles main draw:

- (Canada) Bianca Andreescu
- (Canada) Isabelle Boulais
- (Canada) Marie-Alexandre Leduc
- (Canada) Carol Zhao

The following players received entry from the qualifying draw:

- (United States) Jessie Aney
- (United States) Francesca Di Lorenzo
- (United States) Jessica Failla
- (Canada) Catherine Leduc
- (Canada) Erin Routliffe
- (United States) Kennedy Shaffer
- (United States) Kristina Smith
- (United States) Ronit Yurovsky

== Champions ==
=== Men's singles ===
- (Japan) Go Soeda def. (Slovenia) Blaž Kavčič, 6–7^{(4–7)}, 6–4, 6–2

=== Women's singles ===
- (United States) Francesca Di Lorenzo def. (Canada) Erin Routliffe, 6–4, 6–1

=== Men's doubles ===
- (United States) Mitchell Krueger / (United States) Daniel Nguyen def. (Australia) Jarryd Chaplin / (Australia) Benjamin Mitchell, 6–2, 7–5

=== Women's doubles ===
- (United States) Francesca Di Lorenzo / (United States) Ronit Yurovsky def. (Canada) Marie-Alexandre Leduc / (Canada) Charlotte Robillard-Millette, 1–6, 7–5, [10–6]
