= 2024 Winnipeg National Bank Challenger – Doubles =

Doubles
- 2024 Winnipeg National Bank Challenger

Final
- Champions: (United States) Christian Harrison (United States) Cannon Kingsley
- Runners-up: (Japan) Yuta Shimizu (Japan) Kaichi Uchida
- Score: 6–1, 6–4

Events
Singles	Doubles
← 2023 ·	Winnipeg National Bank Challenger	· 2025 →

Gabriel Diallo and Leandro Riedi were the defending champions but chose not to defend their title.

Christian Harrison and Cannon Kingsley won the title, defeating Yuta Shimizu and Kaichi Uchida 6–1, 6–4 in the final.

== Seeds ==
1. (United States) Ryan Seggerman / (United States) Patrik Trhac (first round)
2. (Mexico) Hans Hach Verdugo / (United States) Vasil Kirkov (quarterfinals)
3. (United States) Mac Kiger / (United States) Alex Lawson (quarterfinals)
4. (Japan) Yuta Shimizu / (Japan) Kaichi Uchida (final)

== Draw ==
Key

- Q = Qualifier
- WC = Wild card
- LL = Lucky loser
- Alt = Alternate
- ITF = ITF entry
- PR = Protected ranking
- SR = Special ranking
- SE = Special exempt
- JE = Junior exempt
- JR = Junior Accelerator Programme entrant
- CO = College Accelerator Programme entrant
- NG = Next Gen Accelerator Program entrant
- w/o = Walkover
- r = Retired
- d = Defaulted

=== Draw ===
First round
1	(United States) R Seggerman (United States) P Trhac	6	6^{12}	[8]
(Australia) K Pearson (New Zealand) F Reynolds	4	7^{14}	[10]
(France) C Chidekh (France) L Sanchez	4	6	[6]
WC	(Canada) JC Aguilar (Canada) T Baadi	6	4	[10]
4	(Japan) Y Shimizu (Japan) K Uchida	7^{7}	0	[10]
(France) B Bonzi (France) A Géa	6^{4}	6	[2]
(United Kingdom) R Peniston (Canada) B Sigouin	4	6	[13]
(Lebanon) H Habib (United States) T Hilderbrand	6	4	[15]
Alt	(Japan) Ryuki Matsuda (Japan) H Moriya	0	5
(United States) C Harrison (United States) C Kingsley	6	7
(Canada) K Stevenson (United States) Tennyson Whiting	6^{3}	3
3	(United States) M Kiger (United States) A Lawson	7^{7}	6
WC	(Canada) L Draxl (Canada) C Harper	6	7^{10}
(Colombia) N Mejía (Colombia) A Urrea	1	6^{8}
(United States) T Boyer (Australia) A Taylor	5	4
2	(Mexico) H Hach Verdugo (United States) V Kirkov	7	6

Quarterfinals
(Australia) K Pearson (New Zealand) F Reynolds	5	7	[10]
WC	(Canada) JC Aguilar (Canada) T Baadi	7	5	[12]
4	(Japan) Y Shimizu (Japan) K Uchida	5	7	[10]
(Lebanon) H Habib (United States) T Hilderbrand	7	5	[5]
(United States) C Harrison (United States) C Kingsley	6	7
3	(United States) M Kiger (United States) A Lawson	2	5
WC	(Canada) L Draxl (Canada) C Harper	6	6
2	(Mexico) H Hach Verdugo (United States) V Kirkov	4	1

Semifinals
WC	(Canada) JC Aguilar (Canada) T Baadi	6	4	[4]
4	(Japan) Y Shimizu (Japan) K Uchida	4	6	[10]
(United States) C Harrison (United States) C Kingsley	6	6
WC	(Canada) L Draxl (Canada) C Harper	3	3

Final
4	(Japan) Y Shimizu (Japan) K Uchida	1	4
(United States) C Harrison (United States) C Kingsley	6	6
