= 2025 Winnipeg National Bank Challenger – Singles =

Singles
- 2025 Winnipeg National Bank Challenger

Final
- Champion: (Canada) Liam Draxl
- Runner-up: (Belgium) Alexander Blockx
- Score: 1–6, 6–3, 6–4

Events
Singles	Doubles
← 2024 ·	Winnipeg National Bank Challenger	· 2026 →

Benjamin Bonzi was the defending champion but chose not to defend his title.

Liam Draxl won the title after defeating Alexander Blockx 1–6, 6–3, 6–4 in the final.

== Seeds ==
1. (Belgium) Alexander Blockx (final)
2. (Canada) Liam Draxl (champion)
3. (Japan) Sho Shimabukuro (semifinals)
4. (Canada) Alexis Galarneau (first round)
5. (Japan) Yuta Shimizu (quarterfinals)
6. (Japan) Rio Noguchi (quarterfinals)
7. (Chinese Taipei) Hsu Yu-hsiou (quarterfinals)
8. (Colombia) Nicolás Mejía (first round)

== Draw ==
Key

- Q = Qualifier
- WC = Wild card
- LL = Lucky loser
- Alt = Alternate
- ITF = ITF entry
- PR = Protected ranking
- SR = Special ranking
- SE = Special exempt
- JE = Junior exempt
- JR = Junior Accelerator Programme entrant
- CO = College Accelerator Programme entrant
- NG = Next Gen Accelerator Program entrant
- w/o = Walkover
- r = Retired
- d = Defaulted

=== Finals ===
Semifinals
1	(Belgium) Alexander Blockx	6	3	7
3	(Japan) Sho Shimabukuro	1	6	5
(China) Zhou Yi	2	4
2	(Canada) Liam Draxl	6	6

Final
1	(Belgium) Alexander Blockx	6	3	4
2	(Canada) Liam Draxl	1	6	6

=== Top half ===
First round
1	(Belgium) A Blockx	7	6
Q	(Canada) Alvin Nicholas Tudorica	5	2
(Japan) N Nakagawa	6^{4}	6	3
(Japan) R Sakamoto	7^{7}	2	6
(Australia) M Bouzige	6	7
(Czech Republic) M Gengel	4	5
(Brazil) K Sell	6	6^{6}	6^{4}
5	(Japan) Y Shimizu	2	7^{8}	7^{7}
3	(Japan) S Shimabukuro	6	6
(United States) Christian Langmo	2	4
(United States) G Johns	6	2	7^{7}
Q	(South Korea) H Chung	3	6	6^{4}
Q	(Switzerland) L Riedi	2	7	4
(United Kingdom) P Jubb	6	5	6
WC	(Canada) J Boulais	0	5
7	(Chinese Taipei) Y-h Hsu	6	7

Second round
1	(Belgium) A Blockx	6	7
(Japan) R Sakamoto	2	5
(Australia) M Bouzige	4	3
5	(Japan) Y Shimizu	6	6
3	(Japan) S Shimabukuro	6	7^{7}
(United States) G Johns	3	6^{3}
(United Kingdom) P Jubb	1	6^{5}
7	(Chinese Taipei) Y-h Hsu	6	7^{7}

Quarterfinals
1	(Belgium) A Blockx	6	6
5	(Japan) Y Shimizu	2	4
3	(Japan) S Shimabukuro	7^{7}	2	6
7	(Chinese Taipei) Y-h Hsu	6^{3}	6	3

Semifinals
1	(Belgium) A Blockx	6	3	7
3	(Japan) S Shimabukuro	1	6	5

=== Bottom half ===
First round
8	(Colombia) N Mejía	6	5	5
(Ecuador) A Andrade	1	7	7
Q	(Estonia) D Glinka	3	2
(Japan) M Imamura	6	6
(China) Y Zhou	3	7^{7}	6
(Chinese Taipei) T-l Wu	6	6^{2}	4
(United States) A Martin	6	6
4/WC	(Canada) A Galarneau	2	4
6	(Japan) R Noguchi	6	3	6
(United States) Andre Ilagan	3	6	1
WC	(Canada) JC Aguilar	3	6	6^{8}
Q	(Canada) N Arseneault	6	4	7^{10}
CO	(Japan) Kenta Miyoshi	6	7
PR	(Australia) P Sekulic	4	5
Q	(Japan) H Moriya	3	1
2	(Canada) L Draxl	6	6

Second round
(Ecuador) A Andrade	6	6
(Japan) M Imamura	3	1
(China) Y Zhou	6	6
(United States) A Martin	4	3
6	(Japan) R Noguchi	7	6
Q	(Canada) N Arseneault	5	2
CO	(Japan) K Miyoshi	1	7	2
2	(Canada) L Draxl	6	5	6

Quarterfinals
(Ecuador) A Andrade	3	1
(China) Y Zhou	6	6
6	(Japan) R Noguchi	1	2
2	(Canada) L Draxl	6	6

Semifinals
(China) Y Zhou	2	4
2	(Canada) L Draxl	6	6
