= 2018 Winnipeg National Bank Challenger – Men's singles =

Men's singles
- 2018 Winnipeg National Bank Challenger

Final
- Champion: (Australia) Jason Kubler
- Runner-up: (Austria) Lucas Miedler
- Score: 6–1, 6–1

Events
Singles	men	women
Doubles	men	women
← 2017 ·	Winnipeg Challenger	· 2019 →

Blaž Kavčič was the defending champion but chose not to defend his title.

Jason Kubler won the title after defeating Lucas Miedler 6–1, 6–1 in the final.

== Seeds ==
1. (Canada) Peter Polansky (second round)
2. (Spain) Marcel Granollers (semifinals)
3. (United States) Michael Mmoh (second round)
4. (Australia) Jason Kubler (champion)
5. (Japan) Tatsuma Ito (first round)
6. (Japan) Go Soeda (semifinals)
7. (Canada) Filip Peliwo (second round)
8. (Canada) Brayden Schnur (first round)

== Draw ==
=== Key ===
- Q = Qualifier
- WC = Wild card
- LL = Lucky loser
- Alt = Alternate
- SE = Special exempt
- PR = Protected ranking
- ITF = ITF entry
- JE = Junior exempt
- w/o = Walkover
- r = Retired
- d = Defaulted
- SR = Special ranking

=== Finals ===
Semifinals
(Austria) Lucas Miedler	6	3	6
6	(Japan) Go Soeda	3	6	3
4	(Australia) Jason Kubler	4	7	6
2	(Spain) Marcel Granollers	6	5	3

Final
(Austria) Lucas Miedler	1	1
4	(Australia) Jason Kubler	6	6

=== Top half ===
First round
1	(Canada) P Polansky	7^{7}	7^{7}
WC	(Canada) Pavel Krainik	6^{1}	6^{5}
(Japan) Y Uchiyama	3	1^{r}
(Austria) L Miedler	6	4
(Japan) Renta Tokuda	5	5
(Japan) K Uchida	7	7
WC	(Canada) B Sigouin	6	4	3
7	(Canada) F Peliwo	0	6	6
3	(United States) M Mmoh	6^{2}	6	7
(Australia) B Mousley	7^{7}	4	5
WC	(Canada) A Galarneau	6^{2}	7^{8}	6
(China) Z Li	7^{7}	6^{6}	3
WC	(Canada) David Volfson	3	3
Q	(South Korea) Y-s Chung	6	6
(Lithuania) L Grigelis	3	0
6	(Japan) G Soeda	6	6

Second round
1	(Canada) P Polansky	6^{4}	7	1
(Austria) L Miedler	7^{7}	5	6
(Japan) K Uchida	6^{3}	6	6
7	(Canada) F Peliwo	7^{7}	1	2
3	(United States) M Mmoh	7^{7}	1	1
WC	(Canada) A Galarneau	6^{3}	6	6
Q	(South Korea) Y-s Chung	2	6	4
6	(Japan) G Soeda	6	2	6

Quarterfinals
(Austria) L Miedler	7^{7}	6
(Japan) K Uchida	6^{4}	4
WC	(Canada) A Galarneau	0	2
6	(Japan) G Soeda	6	6

Semifinals
(Austria) L Miedler	6	3	6
6	(Japan) G Soeda	3	6	3

=== Bottom half ===
First round
5	(Japan) T Ito	6^{4}	2
Q	(Switzerland) M-A Hüsler	7^{7}	6
(France) A Escoffier	1	6	7^{8}
(Brazil) J Menezes	6	2	6^{6}
(Germany) D Köpfer	6	6
(Italy) S Napolitano	4	3
(Japan) Y Takahashi	2	2
4	(Australia) J Kubler	6	6
8	(Canada) B Schnur	2	4
(Canada) F Dancevic	6	6
Q	(Denmark) M Torpegaard	6	6
(Italy) A Bega	3	3
(Israel) E Leshem	4	6	1
Q	(United States) Evan Song	6	1	6
(Australia) A Harris	3	4
2	(Spain) M Granollers	6	6

Second round
Q	(Switzerland) M-A Hüsler	6	7^{8}
(France) A Escoffier	4	6^{6}
(Germany) D Köpfer	1	2
4	(Australia) J Kubler	6	6
(Canada) F Dancevic	6	3	4
Q	(Denmark) M Torpegaard	3	6	6
Q	(United States) E Song	2	1
2	(Spain) M Granollers	6	6

Quarterfinals
Q	(Switzerland) M-A Hüsler	2	3
4	(Australia) J Kubler	6	6
Q	(Denmark) M Torpegaard	4	1
2	(Spain) M Granollers	6	6

Semifinals
4	(Australia) J Kubler	4	7	6
2	(Spain) M Granollers	6	5	3
