= 2017 Winnipeg National Bank Challenger =

- Date: July 11–16
- Edition: 2nd (men); 5th (women)
- Category: ATP Challenger Tour; ITF Women's Circuit
- Prize money: US$75,000 (men); US$25,000 (women)
- Surface: Hard – outdoors
- Location: Winnipeg, Manitoba, Canada
- Venue: Winnipeg Lawn Tennis Club

Champions

Men's singles
- (Slovenia) Blaž Kavčič

Women's singles
- (United States) Caroline Dolehide

Men's doubles
- (United Kingdom) Luke Bambridge / (Republic of Ireland) David O'Hare

Women's doubles
- (Japan) Hiroko Kuwata / (Russia) Valeria Savinykh
- Winnipeg Challenger

The 2017 Winnipeg National Bank Challenger was a professional tennis tournament played on outdoor hard courts. It was the 2nd edition, for men, and 5th edition, for women, of the tournament and part of the 2017 ATP Challenger Tour and the 2017 ITF Women's Circuit, offering totals of $75,000, for men, and $25,000, for women, in prize money. It took place in Winnipeg, Manitoba, Canada between July 11 and July 16, 2017.

== Men's singles main-draw entrants ==
=== Seeds ===
Country	Player	Rank^{1}	Seed
SLO	Blaž Kavčič	110	1
CAN	Peter Polansky	127	2
JPN	Tatsuma Ito	181	3
JPN	Yasutaka Uchiyama	186	4
JPN	Hiroki Moriya	187	5
CAN	Steven Diez	225	6
CAN	Brayden Schnur	233	7
SLO	Blaž Rola	245	8

- ^{1} Rankings are as of July 3, 2017

=== Other entrants ===
The following players received wildcards into the singles main draw:

- (Canada) Hugo Di Feo
- (Canada) Jack Mingjie Lin
- (Canada) Samuel Monette
- (Canada) Nicaise Muamba

The following players received entry from the qualifying draw:

- (United Kingdom) Luke Bambridge
- (Venezuela) Luis David Martínez
- (United States) Alex Rybakov
- (United States) Ronnie Schneider

== Women's singles main-draw entrants ==
=== Seeds ===
Country	Player	Rank^{1}	Seed
USA	Nicole Gibbs	117	1
USA	Danielle Collins	164	2
USA	Danielle Lao	241	3
USA	Caroline Dolehide	246	4
JPN	Mayo Hibi	250	5
JPN	Hiroko Kuwata	256	6
POR	Michelle Larcher de Brito	283	7
USA	Francesca Di Lorenzo	289	8

- ^{1} Rankings are as of July 3, 2017

=== Other entrants ===
The following players received wildcards into the singles main draw:

- (Canada) Isabelle Boulais
- (Canada) Petra Januskova
- (Canada) Catherine Leduc
- (Canada) Charlotte Robillard-Millette

The following player entered the singles main draw with a protected ranking:

- (Australia) Kimberly Birrell

The following players received entry from the qualifying draw:

- (United States) Helen Abigail Altick
- (United States) Sara Daavettila
- (United States) Jessica Failla
- (Canada) Leylah Annie Fernandez
- (Russia) Nika Kukharchuk
- (United States) Alexandra Mueller
- (United States) Shelby Talcott
- (Mexico) Marcela Zacarías

== Champions ==
=== Men's singles ===
- (Slovenia) Blaž Kavčič def. (Canada) Peter Polansky, 7–5, 3–6, 7–5

=== Women's singles ===
- (United States) Caroline Dolehide def. (Japan) Mayo Hibi, 6–3, 6–4

=== Men's doubles ===
- (United Kingdom) Luke Bambridge / (Republic of Ireland) David O'Hare def. (Japan) Yusuke Takahashi / (Japan) Renta Tokuda, 6–2, 6–2

=== Women's doubles ===
- (Japan) Hiroko Kuwata / (Russia) Valeria Savinykh def. (Australia) Kimberly Birrell / (United States) Caroline Dolehide, 6–4, 7–6^{(7–4)}
