= 2022 Winnipeg National Bank Challenger =

- Date: July 25–31
- Edition: 5th
- Category: ATP Challenger Tour
- Surface: Hard – outdoors
- Location: Winnipeg, Manitoba, Canada
- Venue: Winnipeg Lawn Tennis Club

Champions

Singles
- (Ecuador) Emilio Gómez

Doubles
- (United Kingdom) Billy Harris / (Canada) Kelsey Stevenson
- Winnipeg Challenger

The 2022 Winnipeg National Bank Challenger was a professional tennis tournament played on outdoor hard courts. It was the 5th edition of the tournament and part of the 2022 ATP Challenger Tour. It took place in Winnipeg, Manitoba, Canada between July 25 and July 31, 2022.

== Singles main-draw entrants ==
=== Seeds ===
Country	Player	Rank^{1}	Seed
GBR	Liam Broady	133	1
ECU	Emilio Gómez	138	2
CAN	Vasek Pospisil	139	3
USA	Michael Mmoh	162	4
JPN	Kaichi Uchida	172	5
TPE	Wu Tung-lin	179	6
NED	Gijs Brouwer	201	7
ARG	Genaro Alberto Olivieri	209	8

- ^{1} Rankings are as of July 18, 2022.

=== Other entrants ===
The following players received wildcards into the singles main draw:

- (Canada) Gabriel Diallo
- (Canada) Liam Draxl
- (Canada) Jaden Weekes

The following players received entry from the qualifying draw:

- (Canada) Juan Carlos Aguilar
- (United States) Alafia Ayeni
- (United Kingdom) Kyle Edmund
- (United States) Govind Nanda
- (United States) Zachary Svajda
- (United States) Evan Zhu

The following player received entry as a lucky loser:

- (Japan) Sho Shimabukuro

== Champions ==
=== Singles ===
- (Ecuador) Emilio Gómez def. (Canada) Alexis Galarneau 6–3, 7–6^{(7–4)}.

=== Doubles ===
- (United Kingdom) Billy Harris / (Canada) Kelsey Stevenson def. (United States) Max Schnur / (Australia) John-Patrick Smith 2–6, 7–6^{(11–9)}, [10–8].
