= 2016 Winnipeg National Bank Challenger – Women's doubles =

Women's doubles
- 2016 Winnipeg National Bank Challenger

Final
- Champions: (United States) Francesca Di Lorenzo (United States) Ronit Yurovsky
- Runners-up: (Canada) Marie-Alexandre Leduc (Canada) Charlotte Robillard-Millette
- Score: 1–6, 7–5, [10–6]

Events
| Singles | men | women |
| Doubles | men | women |
- Winnipeg Challenger

Sharon Fichman and Jovana Jakšić were the defending champions, but decided not to participate this year.

Francesca Di Lorenzo and Ronit Yurovsky won the title, defeating Marie-Alexandre Leduc and Charlotte Robillard-Millette 1–6, 7–5, [10–6] in the final.

== Seeds ==
1. (Australia) Alison Bai / (Chinese Taipei) Hsu Chieh-yu (semifinals)
2. (Australia) Olivia Rogowska / (United Kingdom) Emily Webley-Smith (semifinals)
3. (Canada) Petra Januskova / (Hungary) Naomi Totka (first round, retired)
4. (Australia) Lizette Cabrera / (United States) Lauren Herring (first round)

== Draw ==
Key

- Q = Qualifier
- WC = Wild card
- LL = Lucky loser
- Alt = Alternate
- ITF = ITF entry
- PR = Protected ranking
- SR = Special ranking
- SE = Special exempt
- JE = Junior exempt
- JR = Junior Accelerator Programme entrant
- CO = College Accelerator Programme entrant
- NG = Next Gen Accelerator Program entrant
- w/o = Walkover
- r = Retired
- d = Defaulted

First round
1 | (Australia) A Bai (Chinese Taipei) C-y Hsu | 6 | 6
(Samoa) S Carruthers (Mexico) S León | 3 | 2
(United States) J Aney (United States) J Failla | 1 | 2
(United States) L Guillermo (United States) K Smith | 6 | 6
4 | (Australia) L Cabrera (United States) L Herring | 6 | 3 | [8]
(Canada) M-A Leduc (Canada) C Robillard-Millette | 1 | 6 | [10]
(United States) A Mackey (United States) A Riley | 6 | 6
(Canada) C Leduc (United States) K Olson | 4 | 2
(France) C Roméo (United States) M Schmidt | 6 | 6^{5} | [6]
(United States) F Di Lorenzo (United States) R Yurovsky | 4 | 7^{7} | [10]
(Canada) I Boulais (United States) E Halbauer | 4
3 | (Canada) P Januskova (Hungary) N Totka | 2^{r}
(Japan) M Imanishi (Japan) M Ozeki | 4 | 2
(United States) M Jansen (Canada) E Routliffe | 6 | 6
(Canada) D Chypyha (Canada) L Chypyha | 3 | 6 | [7]
2 | (Australia) O Rogowska (United Kingdom) E Webley-Smith | 6 | 3 | [10]

Quarterfinals
1 | (Australia) A Bai (Chinese Taipei) C-y Hsu | 6 | 6
(United States) L Guillermo (United States) K Smith | 3 | 1
(Canada) M-A Leduc (Canada) C Robillard-Millette | 6 | 6
(United States) A Mackey (United States) A Riley | 4 | 2
(United States) F Di Lorenzo (United States) R Yurovsky | 6 | 6
(Canada) I Boulais (United States) E Halbauer | 2 | 3
(United States) M Jansen (Canada) E Routliffe | 6^{4} | 6 | [7]
2 | (Australia) O Rogowska (United Kingdom) E Webley-Smith | 7^{7} | 3 | [10]

Semifinals
1 | (Australia) A Bai (Chinese Taipei) C-y Hsu | 4 | 4
(Canada) M-A Leduc (Canada) C Robillard-Millette | 6 | 6
(United States) F Di Lorenzo (United States) R Yurovsky | 7^{7} | 3 | [10]
(Australia) O Rogowska (United Kingdom) E Webley-Smith | 6^{3} | 6 | [6]

Final
(Canada) M-A Leduc (Canada) C Robillard-Millette | 6 | 5 | [6]
(United States) F Di Lorenzo (United States) R Yurovsky | 1 | 7 | [10]
