= 2018 Winnipeg National Bank Challenger – Men's doubles =

Men's doubles
- 2018 Winnipeg National Bank Challenger

Final
- Champions: (Switzerland) Marc-Andrea Hüsler (Netherlands) Sem Verbeek
- Runners-up: (Spain) Gerard Granollers (Spain) Marcel Granollers
- Score: 6–7^{(5–7)}, 6–3, [14–12]

Events
Singles	men	women
Doubles	men	women
← 2017 ·	Winnipeg Challenger	· 2019 →

Luke Bambridge and David O'Hare were the defending champions but chose not to defend their title.

Marc-Andrea Hüsler and Sem Verbeek won the title after defeating Gerard and Marcel Granollers 6–7^{(5–7)}, 6–3, [14–12] in the final.

== Seeds ==
1. (Spain) Gerard Granollers / (Spain) Marcel Granollers (final)
2. (Australia) Matt Reid / (Japan) Yasutaka Uchiyama (withdrew)
3. (Switzerland) Marc-Andrea Hüsler / (Netherlands) Sem Verbeek (champions)
4. (Australia) Jason Kubler / (Australia) Bradley Mousley (semifinals)

== Draw ==
=== Key ===
- Q = Qualifier
- WC = Wild card
- LL = Lucky loser
- Alt = Alternate
- SE = Special exempt
- PR = Protected ranking
- ITF = ITF entry
- JE = Junior exempt
- w/o = Walkover
- r = Retired
- d = Defaulted
- SR = Special ranking

First round
1	(Spain) G Granollers (Spain) M Granollers	6	6
(United Kingdom) L Johnson (United States) R Schneider	4	3
(Canada) F Peliwo (Canada) B Schnur	6	3	[10]
(Israel) E Leshem (Japan) Y Takahashi	4	6	[7]
4	(Australia) J Kubler (Australia) B Mousley	6	6
WC	(Canada) Pavel Krainik (Canada) David Volfson	0	3
WC	(Canada) A Galarneau (Canada) B Sigouin	2	3
(United States) M Mmoh (Canada) P Polansky	6	6
(Australia) A Harris (Germany) D Köpfer	6^{5}	6	[8]
(Lithuania) L Grigelis (Italy) S Napolitano	7^{7}	0	[10]
(Italy) A Bega (Japan) K Uchida	1	3
3	(Switzerland) M-A Hüsler (Netherlands) S Verbeek	6	6
WC	(Canada) JM Lin (Canada) Nicaise Muamba	4	6	[7]
(China) Z Li (Japan) G Soeda	6	3	[10]
(France) A Escoffier (Austria) L Miedler	6	6
Alt	(France) Baptiste Crepatte (Brazil) J Menezes	4	0

Quarterfinals
1	(Spain) G Granollers (Spain) M Granollers	6	7
(Canada) F Peliwo (Canada) B Schnur	4	5
4	(Australia) J Kubler (Australia) B Mousley	w/o
(United States) M Mmoh (Canada) P Polansky
(Lithuania) L Grigelis (Italy) S Napolitano	5	6	[7]
3	(Switzerland) M-A Hüsler (Netherlands) S Verbeek	7	4	[10]
(China) Z Li (Japan) G Soeda	6	6
(France) A Escoffier (Austria) L Miedler	2	3

Semifinals
1	(Spain) G Granollers (Spain) M Granollers	6	7^{7}
4	(Australia) J Kubler (Australia) B Mousley	4	6^{2}
3	(Switzerland) M-A Hüsler (Netherlands) S Verbeek	6^{14}	6	[11]
(China) Z Li (Japan) G Soeda	7^{16}	3	[9]

Final
1	(Spain) G Granollers (Spain) M Granollers	7^{7}	3	[12]
3	(Switzerland) M-A Hüsler (Netherlands) S Verbeek	6^{5}	6	[14]
