= 2024 Winnipeg National Bank Challenger – Singles =

Singles
- 2024 Winnipeg National Bank Challenger

Final
- Champion: (France) Benjamin Bonzi
- Runner-up: (Japan) Sho Shimabukuro
- Score: 5–7, 6–1, 6–4

Events
Singles	Doubles
← 2023 ·	Winnipeg National Bank Challenger	· 2025 →

Ryan Peniston was the defending champion but lost in the first round to Brandon Holt.

Benjamin Bonzi won the title after defeating Sho Shimabukuro 5–7, 6–1, 6–4 in the final.

== Seeds ==
1. (United States) J. J. Wolf (second round)
2. (France) Térence Atmane (second round)
3. (France) Benjamin Bonzi (champion)
4. (United States) Patrick Kypson (withdrew)
5. (Canada) Alexis Galarneau (first round)
6. (Australia) Tristan Schoolkate (quarterfinals)
7. (France) Hugo Grenier (quarterfinals)
8. (South Korea) Hong Seong-chan (first round)

== Draw ==
=== Key ===
- Q = Qualifier
- WC = Wild card
- LL = Lucky loser
- Alt = Alternate
- SE = Special exempt
- PR = Protected ranking
- ITF = ITF entry
- JE = Junior exempt
- w/o = Walkover
- r = Retired
- d = Defaulted
- SR = Special ranking

=== Finals ===
Semifinals
(United States) Eliot Spizzirri	3	6	4
(Japan) Sho Shimabukuro	6	1	6
3	(France) Benjamin Bonzi	3	7^{8}	6
(China) Bu Yunchaokete	6	6^{6}	0

Final
(Japan) Sho Shimabukuro	7	1	4
3	(France) Benjamin Bonzi	5	6	6

=== Top half ===
First round
1	(United States) JJ Wolf	6	6
(France) A Géa	2	4
WC	(Canada) Keegan Rice	3	5
(United States) E Spizzirri	6	7
WC	(Canada) L Draxl	7	7
(Netherlands) G Brouwer	5	5
(Japan) Y Uchiyama	4	3
7	(France) H Grenier	6	6
LL	(Colombia) N Mejía	6	6
Q	(United States) A Mayo	2	4
(Ukraine) I Marchenko	5	1
(Japan) S Shimabukuro	7	6
(United States) T Boyer	6^{5}	5
Q	(Switzerland) A Bellier	7^{7}	7
Q	(Japan) J Trotter	2	6^{5}
6	(Australia) T Schoolkate	6	7^{7}

Second round
1	(United States) JJ Wolf	6^{1}	3
(United States) E Spizzirri	7^{7}	6
WC	(Canada) L Draxl	2	6	5
7	(France) H Grenier	6	3	7
LL	(Colombia) N Mejía	2	1
(Japan) S Shimabukuro	6	6
Q	(Switzerland) A Bellier	6	3	3
6	(Australia) T Schoolkate	4	6	6

Quarterfinals
(United States) E Spizzirri	6	6
7	(France) H Grenier	3	4
(Japan) S Shimabukuro	6	6
6	(Australia) T Schoolkate	2	4

Semifinals
(United States) E Spizzirri	3	6	4
(Japan) S Shimabukuro	6	1	6

=== Bottom half ===
First round
8	(South Korea) S-c Hong	2	5
Alt	(Japan) Y Shimizu	6	7
SE	(United States) N Basavareddy	7	1	4
Q	(Lebanon) H Habib	5	6	6
(Australia) P Sekulic	7	4	6
Q	(Estonia) M Lajal	5	6	3
(United States) E Quinn	4	4
3	(France) B Bonzi	6	6
5	(Canada) A Galarneau	3	2
(Australia) M Polmans	6	6
WC	(Canada) V Pospisil	6	6^{2}	2
(China) Y Bu	3	7^{7}	6
(United Kingdom) R Peniston	5	4
Alt	(United States) B Holt	7	6
Q	(United States) A Martin	5	7^{9}	1
2	(France) T Atmane	7	6^{7}	6

Second round
Alt	(Japan) Y Shimizu	6	6
Q	(Lebanon) H Habib	3	4
(Australia) P Sekulic	3	3
3	(France) B Bonzi	6	6
(Australia) M Polmans	6	2	3
(China) Y Bu	3	6	6
Alt	(United States) B Holt	7	6
2	(France) T Atmane	5	2

Quarterfinals
Alt	(Japan) Y Shimizu	1	6^{0}
3	(France) B Bonzi	6	7^{7}
(China) Y Bu	6^{4}	6	6
Alt	(United States) B Holt	7^{7}	2	2

Semifinals
3	(France) B Bonzi	3	7^{8}	6
(China) Y Bu	6	6^{6}	0
