= 2022 Winnipeg National Bank Challenger – Doubles =

Doubles
- 2022 Winnipeg National Bank Challenger

Final
- Champions: (United Kingdom) Billy Harris (Canada) Kelsey Stevenson
- Runners-up: (United States) Max Schnur (Australia) John-Patrick Smith
- Score: 2–6, 7–6^{(11–9)}, [10–8]

Events
| Singles | Doubles |
| ← 2019 · | Winnipeg Challenger | · 2023 → |

Darian King and Peter Polansky were the defending champions but chose not to defend their title.

Billy Harris and Kelsey Stevenson won the title after defeating Max Schnur and John-Patrick Smith 2–6, 7–6^{(11–9)}, [10–8] in the final.

== Seeds ==
1. (United States) Max Schnur / (Australia) John-Patrick Smith (final)
2. (Philippines) Ruben Gonzales / (United States) Evan King (quarterfinals)
3. (Chinese Taipei) Hsu Yu-hsiou / (Greece) Michail Pervolarakis (first round)
4. (Colombia) Nicolás Mejía / (Ecuador) Roberto Quiroz (quarterfinals)

== Draw ==
Key

- Q = Qualifier
- WC = Wild card
- LL = Lucky loser
- Alt = Alternate
- ITF = ITF entry
- PR = Protected ranking
- SR = Special ranking
- SE = Special exempt
- JE = Junior exempt
- JR = Junior Accelerator Programme entrant
- CO = College Accelerator Programme entrant
- NG = Next Gen Accelerator Program entrant
- w/o = Walkover
- r = Retired
- d = Defaulted

First round
1 | (United States) M Schnur (Australia) J-P Smith | 7^{7} | 6
(Netherlands) G Brouwer (United Kingdom) A McHugh | 6^{4} | 3
WC | (Canada) Marko Stakusic (Canada) Jaden Weekes | 4 | 6^{7}
(Australia) R Hijikata (Canada) B Sigouin | 6 | 7^{9}
3 | (Chinese Taipei) Y-h Hsu (Greece) M Pervolarakis | 3 | 6 | [4]
(Japan) T Matsui (Japan) K Uesugi | 6 | 0 | [10]
(United States) A Ayeni (Canada) T Baadi | 4 | 3
(Canada) L Draxl (Canada) A Galarneau | 6 | 6
(Lebanon) H Habib (Australia) L Tu | 6 | 6^{7} | [12]
(United Kingdom) B Harris (Canada) K Stevenson | 4 | 7^{9} | [14]
(United States) B Holt (United States) N Monroe | 6^{2} | 6 | [11]
4 | (Colombia) N Mejía (Ecuador) R Quiroz | 7^{7} | 3 | [13]
(Canada) JC Aguilar (Canada) G Diallo | 4 | 2
2 | (Philippines) R Gonzales (United States) E King | 6 | 6

Quarterfinals
1 | (United States) M Schnur (Australia) J-P Smith | w/o
(Australia) R Hijikata (Canada) B Sigouin
(Japan) T Matsui (Japan) K Uesugi | 6 | 5 | [10]
(Canada) L Draxl (Canada) A Galarneau | 3 | 7 | [5]
(United Kingdom) B Harris (Canada) K Stevenson | 6 | 6
4 | (Colombia) N Mejía (Ecuador) R Quiroz | 3 | 3
(United States) G Nanda (United States) Z Svajda | 6 | 5 | [10]
2 | (Philippines) R Gonzales (United States) E King | 3 | 7 | [8]

Semifinals
1 | (United States) M Schnur (Australia) J-P Smith | 6 | 6
(Japan) T Matsui (Japan) K Uesugi | 1 | 1
(United Kingdom) B Harris (Canada) K Stevenson | 6 | 6
(United States) G Nanda (United States) Z Svajda | 3 | 4

Final
1 | (United States) M Schnur (Australia) J-P Smith | 6 | 6^{9} | [8]
(United Kingdom) B Harris (Canada) K Stevenson | 2 | 7^{11} | [10]
