= 2016 Winnipeg National Bank Challenger – Men's doubles =

Men's doubles
- 2016 Winnipeg National Bank Challenger

Final
- Champions: (United States) Mitchell Krueger (United States) Daniel Nguyen
- Runners-up: (Australia) Jarryd Chaplin (Australia) Benjamin Mitchell
- Score: 6–2, 7–5

Events
Singles	men	women
Doubles	men	women
- Winnipeg Challenger

This was the first edition of the men's doubles tournament.

Mitchell Krueger and Daniel Nguyen won the title, defeating Jarryd Chaplin and Benjamin Mitchell 6–2, 7–5 in the final.

== Seeds ==
The top two seeds receive a bye into the quarterfinals.

1. (Kazakhstan) Andrey Golubev / (Australia) Matt Reid (semifinals)
2. (Canada) Philip Bester / (Canada) Peter Polansky (quarterfinals)
3. (United States) Sekou Bangoura / (Republic of Ireland) David O'Hare (quarterfinals)
4. (United Kingdom) Luke Bambridge / (United Kingdom) Lloyd Glasspool (quarterfinals)

== Draw ==
Key

- Q = Qualifier
- WC = Wild card
- LL = Lucky loser
- Alt = Alternate
- ITF = ITF entry
- PR = Protected ranking
- SR = Special ranking
- SE = Special exempt
- JE = Junior exempt
- JR = Junior Accelerator Programme entrant
- CO = College Accelerator Programme entrant
- NG = Next Gen Accelerator Program entrant
- w/o = Walkover
- r = Retired
- d = Defaulted

First round
(United Kingdom) C Norrie (New Zealand) F Tearney	6	6
(Canada) F Auger-Aliassime (Canada) B Schnur	2	4
4	(United Kingdom) L Bambridge (United Kingdom) L Glasspool	6^{4}	6	[10]
WC	(Canada) JM Lin (Canada) B Sigouin	7^{7}	4	[8]
WC	(Canada) Kevin Kylar (Canada) Joshua Peck	2	0
(Australia) Jarryd Chaplin (Australia) B Mitchell	6	6
(Australia) M Matosevic (United States) N Meister
(United States) M Krueger (United States) D Nguyen	w/o
(United States) B Fratangelo (United States) T Smyczek	3	3
3	(United States) S Bangoura (Republic of Ireland) D O'Hare	6	6
(Japan) H Moriya (Australia) B Mott	1	2
(Republic of Ireland) S Barry (Japan) Y Uchiyama	6	6

Quarterfinals
1	(Kazakhstan) A Golubev (Australia) M Reid	6	6
(United Kingdom) C Norrie (New Zealand) F Tearney	3	4
4	(United Kingdom) L Bambridge (United Kingdom) L Glasspool	5	3
(Australia) J Chaplin (Australia) B Mitchell	7	6
(United States) M Krueger (United States) D Nguyen	6	7^{7}
3	(United States) S Bangoura (Republic of Ireland) D O'Hare	3	6^{4}
(Republic of Ireland) S Barry (Japan) Y Uchiyama	3	6	[11]
2	(Canada) P Bester (Canada) P Polansky	6	3	[9]

Semifinals
1	(Kazakhstan) A Golubev (Australia) M Reid	3	6	[6]
(Australia) J Chaplin (Australia) B Mitchell	6	2	[10]
(United States) M Krueger (United States) D Nguyen	6	2	[10]
(Republic of Ireland) S Barry (Japan) Y Uchiyama	4	6	[7]

Final
(Australia) J Chaplin (Australia) B Mitchell	2	5
(United States) M Krueger (United States) D Nguyen	6	7
