= 2018 Winnipeg National Bank Challenger =

- Date: July 10–15
- Edition: 3rd (men); 6th (women)
- Category: ATP Challenger Tour; ITF Women's Circuit
- Surface: Hard – outdoors
- Location: Winnipeg, Manitoba, Canada
- Venue: Winnipeg Lawn Tennis Club

Champions

Men's singles
- (Australia) Jason Kubler

Women's singles
- (Canada) Rebecca Marino

Men's doubles
- (Switzerland) Marc-Andrea Hüsler / (Netherlands) Sem Verbeek

Women's doubles
- (Japan) Akiko Omae / (Mexico) Victoria Rodríguez
- Winnipeg Challenger

The 2018 Winnipeg National Bank Challenger was a professional tennis tournament played on outdoor hard courts. It was the 3rd edition, for men, and 6th edition, for women, of the tournament and part of the 2018 ATP Challenger Tour and the 2018 ITF Women's Circuit. It took place in Winnipeg, Manitoba, Canada between July 10 and July 15, 2018.

== Men's singles main-draw entrants ==
=== Seeds ===
Country	Player	Rank^{1}	Seed
CAN	Peter Polansky	110	1
ESP	Marcel Granollers	116	2
USA	Michael Mmoh	119	3
AUS	Jason Kubler	147	4
JPN	Tatsuma Ito	165	5
JPN	Go Soeda	178	6
CAN	Filip Peliwo	181	7
CAN	Brayden Schnur	234	8

- ^{1} Rankings are as of July 2, 2018

=== Other entrants ===
The following players received wildcards into the singles main draw:

- (Canada) Alexis Galarneau
- (Canada) Pavel Krainik
- (Canada) Benjamin Sigouin
- (Canada) David Volfson

The following players received entry from the qualifying draw:

- (South Korea) Chung Yun-seong
- (Switzerland) Marc-Andrea Hüsler
- (United States) Evan Song
- (Denmark) Mikael Torpegaard

== Women's singles main-draw entrants ==
=== Seeds ===
Country	Player	Rank^{1}	Seed
CAN	Bianca Andreescu	184	1
ISR	Julia Glushko	205	2
CAN	Katherine Sebov	268	3
USA	Maria Sanchez	270	4
ITA	Georgia Brescia	281	5
USA	Sophie Chang	288	6
MEX	Victoria Rodríguez	299	7
AUS	Astra Sharma	323	8

- ^{1} Rankings are as of July 2, 2018

=== Other entrants ===
The following players received wildcards into the singles main draw:

- (Canada) Anca Craciun
- (Canada) Catherine Leduc
- (Canada) Alexandra Mikhailuk
- (Canada) Layne Sleeth

The following players received entry from the qualifying draw:

- (United States) Kelly Chen
- (New Zealand) Emily Fanning
- (United States) Lorraine Guillermo
- (Japan) Mai Hontama
- (United States) McCartney Kessler
- (United States) Raveena Kingsley
- (United States) Jada Robinson
- (United States) Ronit Yurovsky

== Champions ==
=== Men's singles ===
- (Australia) Jason Kubler def. (Austria) Lucas Miedler 6–1, 6–1.

=== Women's singles ===
- (Canada) Rebecca Marino def. (Israel) Julia Glushko, 7–6^{(7–3)}, 7–6^{(7–4)}

=== Men's doubles ===
- (Switzerland) Marc-Andrea Hüsler / (Netherlands) Sem Verbeek def. (Spain) Gerard Granollers / (Spain) Marcel Granollers 6–7^{(5–7)}, 6–3, [14–12].

=== Women's doubles ===
- (Japan) Akiko Omae / (Mexico) Victoria Rodríguez def. (Israel) Julia Glushko / (United States) Sanaz Marand, 7–6^{(7–2)}, 6–3
