= 2025 Winnipeg National Bank Challenger =

- Date: July 7–13
- Edition: 8th
- Category: ATP Challenger Tour
- Surface: Hard – outdoors
- Location: Winnipeg, Manitoba, Canada

Champions

Singles
- (Canada) Liam Draxl

Doubles
- (United States) Keshav Chopra / (United States) Andres Martin
← 2024 ·	Winnipeg Challenger	· 2026 →

The 2025 Winnipeg National Bank Challenger was a professional tennis tournament played on outdoor hard courts. It was the 8th edition of the tournament and part of the 2025 ATP Challenger Tour. It took place in Winnipeg, Manitoba, Canada between July 7 and 13, 2025.

== Singles main-draw entrants ==
=== Seeds ===
Country	Player	Rank^{1}	Seed
BEL	Alexander Blockx	141	1
CAN	Liam Draxl	147	2
JPN	Sho Shimabukuro	186	3
CAN	Alexis Galarneau	207	4
JPN	Yuta Shimizu	218	5
JPN	Rio Noguchi	222	6
TPE	Hsu Yu-hsiou	242	7
COL	Nicolás Mejía	243	8

- ^{1} Rankings are as of June 30, 2025.

=== Other entrants ===
The following players received wildcards into the singles main draw:

- (Canada) Juan Carlos Aguilar
- (Canada) Justin Boulais
- (Canada) Alexis Galarneau

The following player received entry into the singles main draw using a protected ranking:

- (Australia) Philip Sekulic

The following player received entry into the singles main draw through the College Accelerator programme:

- (Japan) Kenta Miyoshi

The following players received entry from the qualifying draw:

- (Canada) Nicolas Arseneault
- (South Korea) Chung Hyeon
- (Estonia) Daniil Glinka
- (Japan) Hiroki Moriya
- (Switzerland) Leandro Riedi
- (Canada) Alvin Nicholas Tudorica

== Champions ==
=== Singles ===
- (Canada) Liam Draxl def. (Belgium) Alexander Blockx 1–6, 6–3, 6–4.

=== Doubles ===
- (United States) Keshav Chopra / (United States) Andres Martin def. (Japan) Naoki Nakagawa / (South Africa) Kris van Wyk 7–6^{(7–2)}, 3–6, [10–3].
