= 2017 Winnipeg National Bank Challenger – Women's singles =

Women's singles
- 2017 Winnipeg National Bank Challenger

Final
- Champion: (United States) Caroline Dolehide
- Runner-up: (Japan) Mayo Hibi
- Score: 6–3, 6–4

Events
Singles	men	women
Doubles	men	women
- Winnipeg Challenger

Francesca Di Lorenzo was the defending champion, but lost in the second round to Jessika Ponchet.

Caroline Dolehide won the title, defeating Mayo Hibi 6–3, 6–4 in the final.

== Seeds ==
1. (United States) Nicole Gibbs (semifinals)
2. (United States) Danielle Collins (first round)
3. (United States) Danielle Lao (second round)
4. (United States) Caroline Dolehide (champion)
5. (Japan) Mayo Hibi (final)
6. (Japan) Hiroko Kuwata (quarterfinals)
7. (Portugal) Michelle Larcher de Brito (first round)
8. (United States) Francesca Di Lorenzo (second round)

== Draw ==
Key

- Q = Qualifier
- WC = Wild card
- LL = Lucky loser
- Alt = Alternate
- ITF = ITF entry
- PR = Protected ranking
- SR = Special ranking
- SE = Special exempt
- JE = Junior exempt
- JR = Junior Accelerator Programme entrant
- CO = College Accelerator Programme entrant
- NG = Next Gen Accelerator Program entrant
- w/o = Walkover
- r = Retired
- d = Defaulted

=== Finals ===
Semifinals
1	(United States) Nicole Gibbs	1	6	3
5	(Japan) Mayo Hibi	6	2	6
4	(United States) Caroline Dolehide	6	6
(China) Xu Shilin	2	3

Final
5	(Japan) Mayo Hibi	3	4
4	(United States) Caroline Dolehide	6	6

=== Top half ===
First round
1	(United States) N Gibbs	6	6
WC	(Canada) C Robillard-Millette	1	2
Q	(United States) HA Altick	2	2
(United States) R Yurovsky	6	6
WC	(Canada) I Boulais	3	7^{8}	3
(France) J Ponchet	6	6^{6}	6
Q	(United States) J Failla	6	6^{5}	1
8	(United States) F Di Lorenzo	4	7^{7}	6
3	(United States) D Lao	6	6
(Russia) V Savinykh	4	2
Q	(Mexico) M Zacarías	2	6	4
Q	(United States) A Mueller	6	4	6
Q	(Russia) N Kukharchuk	6^{4}	2
(Australia) E Perez	7^{7}	6
(Italy) C Ferrando	1	1
5	(Japan) M Hibi	6	6

Second round
1	(United States) N Gibbs	7	7
(United States) R Yurovsky	5	5
(France) J Ponchet	6	6
8	(United States) F Di Lorenzo	4	3
3	(United States) D Lao	7^{8}	6^{5}	6^{3}
Q	(United States) A Mueller	6^{6}	7^{7}	7^{7}
(Australia) E Perez	5	2
5	(Japan) M Hibi	7	6

Quarterfinals
1	(United States) N Gibbs	5	6	6
(France) J Ponchet	7	1	3
Q	(United States) A Mueller	3	3
5	(Japan) M Hibi	6	6

Semifinals
1	(United States) N Gibbs	1	6	3
5	(Japan) M Hibi	6	2	6

=== Bottom half ===
First round
7	(Portugal) M Larcher de Brito	3	4
(Japan) M Imanishi	6	6
WC	(Canada) C Leduc	1	1
(Japan) M Minokoshi	6	6
PR	(Australia) K Birrell	6	6
WC	(Canada) P Januskova	4	2
Q	(United States) S Daavettila	3	2
4	(United States) C Dolehide	6	6
6	(Japan) H Kuwata	6	6
(Germany) S-R Sekulic	3	0
Q	(Canada) LA Fernandez	2	1
(Canada) A Wozniak	6	6
(Canada) C Zhao	6	6
Q	(United States) S Talcott	2	0
(China) S Xu	6	7^{7}
2	(United States) D Collins	0	6^{5}

Second round
(Japan) M Imanishi	6	6
(Japan) M Minokoshi	2	1
PR	(Australia) K Birrell	6	2	4
4	(United States) C Dolehide	4	6	6
6	(Japan) H Kuwata	3	6	6
(Canada) A Wozniak	6	3	4
(Canada) C Zhao	6	1	6^{4}
(China) S Xu	4	6	7^{7}

Quarterfinals
(Japan) M Imanishi	7^{8}	4	6^{4}
4	(United States) C Dolehide	6^{6}	6	7^{7}
6	(Japan) H Kuwata	2	6	3
(China) S Xu	6	4	6

Semifinals
4	(United States) C Dolehide	6	6
(China) S Xu	2	3
