= 2016 Winnipeg National Bank Challenger – Men's singles =

Men's singles
- 2016 Winnipeg National Bank Challenger

Final
- Champion: (Japan) Go Soeda
- Runner-up: (Slovenia) Blaž Kavčič
- Score: 6–7^{(4–7)}, 6–4, 6–2

Events
Singles	men	women
Doubles	men	women
- Winnipeg Challenger

This was the first edition of the men's singles tournament.

Go Soeda won the title, defeating Blaž Kavčič 6–7^{(4–7)}, 6–4, 6–2 in the final.

== Seeds ==
1. (United States) Bjorn Fratangelo (second round)
2. (Japan) Yoshihito Nishioka (semifinals, retired)
3. (United States) Tim Smyczek (second round)
4. (France) Vincent Millot (first round)
5. (Japan) Go Soeda (champion)
6. (Germany) Peter Gojowczyk (semifinals)
7. (United States) Frances Tiafoe (first round)
8. (Kazakhstan) Andrey Golubev (first round)

== Draw ==
Key

- Q = Qualifier
- WC = Wild card
- LL = Lucky loser
- Alt = Alternate
- ITF = ITF entry
- PR = Protected ranking
- SR = Special ranking
- SE = Special exempt
- JE = Junior exempt
- JR = Junior Accelerator Programme entrant
- CO = College Accelerator Programme entrant
- NG = Next Gen Accelerator Program entrant
- w/o = Walkover
- r = Retired
- d = Defaulted

=== Finals ===
Semifinals
6	(Germany) Peter Gojowczyk	6	4	0
5	(Japan) Go Soeda	2	6	6
PR	(Slovenia) Blaž Kavčič	6	3
2	(Japan) Yoshihito Nishioka	3	2^{r}

Final
5	(Japan) Go Soeda	6^{4}	6	6
PR	(Slovenia) Blaž Kavčič	7^{7}	4	2

=== Top half ===
First round
1	(United States) B Fratangelo	6	7^{8}
(United Kingdom) L Glasspool	2	6^{6}
WC	(Canada) B Schnur	1	3
(Canada) P Bester	6	6
(United States) M Krueger	6	6
WC	(Canada) B Sigouin	0	4
(United States) S Bangoura	5	6^{3}
6	(Germany) P Gojowczyk	7	7^{7}
3	(United States) T Smyczek	6	6
WC	(Canada) Kevin Kylar	1	1
Q	(Australia) A Vukic	6	1	2
(United States) D Nguyen	4	6	6
(United States) A Sarkissian	4	6	6
Q	(United Kingdom) C Norrie	6	2	4
(United States) T Sandgren	6	4	6^{6}
5	(Japan) G Soeda	4	6	7^{8}

Second round
1	(United States) B Fratangelo	6	5	1
(Canada) P Bester	4	7	6
(United States) M Krueger	3	6	4
6	(Germany) P Gojowczyk	6	4	6
3	(United States) T Smyczek	2	3
(United States) D Nguyen	6	6
(United States) A Sarkissian	3	4
5	(Japan) G Soeda	6	6

Quarterfinals
(Canada) P Bester	5	3
6	(Germany) P Gojowczyk	7	6
(United States) D Nguyen	4	3
5	(Japan) G Soeda	6	6

Semifinals
6	(Germany) P Gojowczyk	6	4	0
5	(Japan) G Soeda	2	6	6

=== Bottom half ===
First round
7	(United States) F Tiafoe	6	3	4
(Japan) Y Uchiyama	4	6	6
(Japan) H Moriya	6	7^{7}
(Republic of Ireland) S Barry	4	6^{5}
PR	(Slovenia) B Kavčič	4	6	7^{10}
WC	(Canada) F Auger-Aliassime	6	2	6^{8}
(Australia) B Mitchell	1	7^{7}	6
4	(France) V Millot	6	6^{3}	4
8	(Kazakhstan) A Golubev	2	3
(Canada) P Polansky	6	6
(United States) N Meister	2	2
Q	(Republic of Ireland) J McGee	6	6
(Australia) M Matosevic	7^{7}	6^{5}	3
Q	(Australia) D Kelly	6^{3}	7^{7}	6
(Australia) M Reid	2	6^{3}
2	(Japan) Y Nishioka	6	7^{7}

Second round
(Japan) Y Uchiyama	5	3
(Japan) H Moriya	7	6
PR	(Slovenia) B Kavčič	6	6
(Australia) B Mitchell	2	1
(Canada) P Polansky	6	6
Q	(Republic of Ireland) J McGee	4	1
Q	(Australia) D Kelly	3	3
2	(Japan) Y Nishioka	6	6

Quarterfinals
(Japan) H Moriya	1	4
PR	(Slovenia) B Kavčič	6	6
(Canada) P Polansky	6^{5}	1
2	(Japan) Y Nishioka	7^{7}	6

Semifinals
PR	(Slovenia) B Kavčič	6	3
2	(Japan) Y Nishioka	3	2^{r}
