= 2019 Winnipeg National Bank Challenger – Singles =

Singles
- 2019 Winnipeg National Bank Challenger

Final
- Champion: (Slovakia) Norbert Gombos
- Runner-up: (Canada) Brayden Schnur
- Score: 7–6^{(7–3)}, 6–3

Events
Singles	Doubles
← 2018 ·	Winnipeg Challenger	· 2022 →

Jason Kubler was the defending champion but chose not to defend his title.

Norbert Gombos won the title after defeating Brayden Schnur 7–6^{(7–3)}, 6–3 in the final.

== Seeds ==
All seeds receive a bye into the second round.

1. (Australia) Bernard Tomic (third round)
2. (France) Antoine Hoang (quarterfinals)
3. (Canada) Brayden Schnur (final)
4. (Canada) Peter Polansky (third round)
5. (Israel) Dudi Sela (second round)
6. (Slovakia) Norbert Gombos (champion)
7. (Japan) Go Soeda (second round, retired)
8. (Denmark) Mikael Torpegaard (second round)
9. (Barbados) Darian King (third round)
10. (France) Maxime Janvier (second round)
11. (France) Enzo Couacaud (third round)
12. (Australia) Andrew Harris (third round)
13. (China) Li Zhe (quarterfinals)
14. (Japan) Kaichi Uchida (second round)
15. (Japan) Hiroki Moriya (semifinals)
16. (Canada) Filip Peliwo (withdrew)

== Draw ==
=== Key ===
- Q = Qualifier
- WC = Wild card
- LL = Lucky loser
- Alt = Alternate
- SE = Special exempt
- PR = Protected ranking
- ITF = ITF entry
- JE = Junior exempt
- w/o = Walkover
- r = Retired
- d = Defaulted
- SR = Special ranking

=== Finals ===
Quarterfinals
13	(China) Li Zhe	4	2
6	(Slovakia) Norbert Gombos	6	6
15	(Japan) Hiroki Moriya	6	6
(Turkey) Cem İlkel	4	2
(United States) Maxime Cressy	2	5
3	(Canada) Brayden Schnur	6	7
(United States) Daniel Nguyen	7^{7}	4	6
2	(France) Antoine Hoang	6^{5}	6	3

Semifinals
6	(Slovakia) Norbert Gombos	6	6
15	(Japan) Hiroki Moriya	4	2
3	(Canada) Brayden Schnur	6	7
(United States) Daniel Nguyen	2	5

Final
6	(Slovakia) Norbert Gombos	7^{7}	6
3	(Canada) Brayden Schnur	6^{3}	3

=== Top half ===
==== Section 1 ====
First round
WC	(Canada) Nicaise Muamba	6	7
Q	(Mexico) H Hach Verdugo	4	5
(Brazil) J Menezes	6	6
(Chile) MT Barrios Vera	3	3
(United States) A Ritschard	6	6
(Zimbabwe) T Garanganga	4	4
(Canada) B Sigouin	6	3	6
PR	(Spain) C Gómez-Herrera	2	6	3

Second round
1	(Australia) B Tomic	6	6
WC	(Canada) N Muamba	4	2
(Brazil) J Menezes	3	2
13	(China) Z Li	6	6
12	(Australia) A Harris	6	6
(United States) A Ritschard	1	2
(Canada) B Sigouin	6^{3}	3
6	(Slovakia) N Gombos	7^{7}	6

Third round
1	(Australia) B Tomic	6	6^{7}	4
13	(China) Z Li	1	7^{9}	6
12	(Australia) A Harris	6	2	3
6	(Slovakia) N Gombos	4	6	6

Quarterfinals
13	(China) Z Li	4	2
6	(Slovakia) N Gombos	6	6

==== Section 2 ====
First round
WC	(Canada) JM Lin	6	6
WC	(Canada) Chaz Doherty	1	1
ITF	(United States) S Kirchheimer	4	4
(United States) J. J. Wolf	6	6
(Croatia) B Gojo	4	6	3
(Turkey) C İlkel	6	4	6
(United States) Evan Song	1	4
(Spain) R Ortega Olmedo	6	6

Second round
4	(Canada) P Polansky	6	6
WC	(Canada) JM Lin	4	3
(United States) J. J. Wolf	4	0
15	(Japan) H Moriya	6	6
10	(France) M Janvier	6^{2}	1
(Turkey) C İlkel	7^{7}	6
(Spain) R Ortega Olmedo	6	6
5	(Israel) D Sela	4	2

Third round
4	(Canada) P Polansky	4	7	6^{1}
15	(Japan) H Moriya	6	5	7^{7}
(Turkey) C İlkel	7^{11}	6
(Spain) R Ortega Olmedo	6^{9}	3

Quarterfinals
15	(Japan) H Moriya	6	6
(Turkey) C İlkel	4	2

=== Bottom half ===
==== Section 3 ====
First round
(United States) M Cressy	6	7^{7}
(Chile) A Tabilo	1	6^{4}
(United Kingdom) B Klein	6	6
Alt	(Portugal) B Saraiva	1	2
ITF	(Japan) Issei Okamura	2	5
WC	(Canada) J Boulais	6	7
(United States) D Novikov	6	7^{7}
Alt	(Canada) Joshua Peck	4	6^{3}

Second round
8	(Denmark) M Torpegaard	7^{7}	3	0
(United States) M Cressy	6^{1}	6	6
(United Kingdom) B Klein	0	6^{2}
9	(Barbados) D King	6	7^{7}
14	(Japan) K Uchida	6	3	3
WC	(Canada) J Boulais	3	6	6
(United States) D Novikov	0	6^{1}
3	(Canada) B Schnur	6	7^{7}

Third round
(United States) M Cressy	7	7^{7}
9	(Barbados) D King	5	6^{5}
WC	(Canada) J Boulais	4	7^{7}	3
3	(Canada) B Schnur	6	6^{0}	6

Quarterfinals
(United States) M Cressy	2	5
3	(Canada) B Schnur	6	7

==== Section 4 ====
First round
(Canada) A Galarneau	6	1	5
(United States) D Nguyen	1	6	7
ITF	(United States) Alexander Lebedev	6^{4}	4
Q	(Japan) T Matsui	7^{7}	6
(Monaco) L Catarina	6	6
WC	(Canada) G Diallo	3	2
ITF	(Australia) Jacob Grills	7^{8}	6^{0}	0
ITF	(Japan) Shintaro Imai	6^{6}	7^{7}	6

Second round
7	(Japan) G Soeda	3	0^{r}
(United States) D Nguyen	6	0
Q	(Japan) T Matsui	3	2
11	(France) E Couacaud	6	6
LL	(Canada) Kevin Kylar	0	1
(Monaco) L Catarina	6	6
ITF	(Japan) S Imai	6^{5}	5
2	(France) A Hoang	7^{7}	7

Third round
(United States) D Nguyen	1	6	6
11	(France) E Couacaud	6	3	2
(Monaco) L Catarina	6	3	0
2	(France) A Hoang	4	6	6

Quarterfinals
(United States) D Nguyen	7^{7}	4	6
2	(France) A Hoang	6^{5}	6	3
