= 2017 Winnipeg National Bank Challenger – Women's doubles =

Women's doubles
- 2017 Winnipeg National Bank Challenger

Final
- Champions: (Japan) Hiroko Kuwata (Russia) Valeria Savinykh
- Runners-up: (Australia) Kimberly Birrell (United States) Caroline Dolehide
- Score: 6–4, 7–6^{(7–4)}

Events
Singles	men	women
Doubles	men	women
- Winnipeg Challenger

Francesca Di Lorenzo and Ronit Yurovsky were the defending champions, but decided not to compete together. Di Lorenzo partnered with Ingrid Neel, but lost in the semifinals to Kimberly Birrell and Caroline Dolehide. Yurovsky partnered with Alexa Guarachi, but lost in the first round to Di Lorenzo and Neel.

Hiroko Kuwata and Valeria Savinykh won the title, defeating Birrell and Dolehide 6–4, 7–6^{(7–4)} in the final.

== Seeds ==
1. (Japan) Hiroko Kuwata / (Russia) Valeria Savinykh (champions)
2. (Chile) Alexa Guarachi / (United States) Ronit Yurovsky (first round)
3. (Canada) Charlotte Robillard-Millette / (Canada) Carol Zhao (quarterfinals)
4. (United States) Alexandra Mueller / (Australia) Ellen Perez (semifinals)

== Draw ==
Key

- Q = Qualifier
- WC = Wild card
- LL = Lucky loser
- Alt = Alternate
- ITF = ITF entry
- PR = Protected ranking
- SR = Special ranking
- SE = Special exempt
- JE = Junior exempt
- JR = Junior Accelerator Programme entrant
- CO = College Accelerator Programme entrant
- NG = Next Gen Accelerator Program entrant
- w/o = Walkover
- r = Retired
- d = Defaulted

First round
(Italy) C Ferrando (United Kingdom) S Murray	6	7^{7}
(Canada) P Januskova (Canada) A Wozniak	1	6^{1}
4	(United States) A Mueller (Australia) E Perez	6	6
(United States) J Failla (Canada) C Leduc	3	2
(United States) L Guillermo (Canada) D Silva	2	6	[10]
(Japan) M Imanishi (Mexico) M Zacarías	6	3	[12]
(Australia) K Birrell (United States) C Dolehide	6	6
(United States) S Daavettila (United States) A Graham	0	4
(Germany) S-R Sekulic (United States) S Talcott	4	6^{1}
3	(Canada) C Robillard-Millette (Canada) C Zhao	6	7^{7}
(Japan) M Hibi (France) J Ponchet	6	6
WC	(Canada) M Popovic (Canada) K Waschuk	0	0
(United States) F Di Lorenzo (United States) I Neel	6	4	[12]
2	(Chile) A Guarachi (United States) R Yurovsky	1	6	[10]

Quarterfinals
1	(Japan) H Kuwata (Russia) V Savinykh	6	6
(Italy) C Ferrando (United Kingdom) S Murray	4	4
4	(United States) A Mueller (Australia) E Perez	6	7
(Japan) M Imanishi (Mexico) M Zacarías	1	5
(Australia) K Birrell (United States) C Dolehide	6	6
3	(Canada) C Robillard-Millette (Canada) C Zhao	0	1
(Japan) M Hibi (France) J Ponchet	7^{7}	2	[6]
(United States) F Di Lorenzo (United States) I Neel	6^{4}	6	[10]

Semifinals
1	(Japan) H Kuwata (Russia) V Savinykh	6	6
4	(United States) A Mueller (Australia) E Perez	4	3
(Australia) K Birrell (United States) C Dolehide	6	1	[10]
(United States) F Di Lorenzo (United States) I Neel	4	6	[7]

Final
1	(Japan) H Kuwata (Russia) V Savinykh	6	7^{7}
(Australia) K Birrell (United States) C Dolehide	4	6^{4}
