= 2017 Winnipeg National Bank Challenger – Men's doubles =

Men's doubles
- 2017 Winnipeg National Bank Challenger

Final
- Champions: (United Kingdom) Luke Bambridge (Republic of Ireland) David O'Hare
- Runners-up: (Japan) Yusuke Takahashi (Japan) Renta Tokuda
- Score: 6–2, 6–2

Events
Singles	men	women
Doubles	men	women
- Winnipeg Challenger

Mitchell Krueger and Daniel Nguyen were the defending champions but chose not to defend their title.

Luke Bambridge and David O'Hare won the title after defeating Yusuke Takahashi and Renta Tokuda 6–2, 6–2 in the final.

== Seeds ==
1. (United Kingdom) Luke Bambridge / (Republic of Ireland) David O'Hare (champions)
2. (Canada) Philip Bester / (Canada) Peter Polansky (first round)
3. (United States) Sekou Bangoura / (Philippines) Ruben Gonzales (quarterfinals)
4. (Italy) Alessandro Bega / (Australia) Bradley Mousley (first round)

== Draw ==
Key

- Q = Qualifier
- WC = Wild card
- LL = Lucky loser
- Alt = Alternate
- ITF = ITF entry
- PR = Protected ranking
- SR = Special ranking
- SE = Special exempt
- JE = Junior exempt
- JR = Junior Accelerator Programme entrant
- CO = College Accelerator Programme entrant
- NG = Next Gen Accelerator Program entrant
- w/o = Walkover
- r = Retired
- d = Defaulted

First round
1	(United Kingdom) L Bambridge (Republic of Ireland) D O'Hare	6	6
(Uruguay) M Felder (Venezuela) LD Martínez	3	2
WC	(Canada) Kevin Kylar (Australia) Mark Verryth	4	1
(United States) A Sarkissian (United States) R Sarmiento	6	6
3	(United States) S Bangoura (Philippines) R Gonzales	6	6
(Israel) E Leshem (Canada) F Peliwo	3	2
(Canada) S Diez (Canada) B Schnur	2	3
(Slovenia) B Rola (Denmark) M Torpegaard	6	6
(Japan) Y Takahashi (Japan) Renta Tokuda	1	7^{8}	[10]
(Chinese Taipei) T Chen (United States) M Purcell	6	6^{6}	[6]
WC	(Canada) Hugo Di Feo (Canada) Samuel Monette	6	6
4	(Italy) A Bega (Australia) B Mousley	4	4
(Israel) Dekel Bar (Japan) K Uchida	4	5
WC	(Canada) JM Lin (Canada) Nicaise Muamba	6	7
(United States) M Giron (United States) T-S Kwiatkowski	6	1	[10]
2	(Canada) P Bester (Canada) P Polansky	3	6	[8]

Quarterfinals
1	(United Kingdom) L Bambridge (Republic of Ireland) D O'Hare	6	7^{7}
(United States) A Sarkissian (United States) R Sarmiento	3	6^{5}
3	(United States) S Bangoura (Philippines) R Gonzales	2	3
(Slovenia) B Rola (Denmark) M Torpegaard	6	6
(Japan) Y Takahashi (Japan) R Tokuda	6	6
WC	(Canada) H Di Feo (Canada) S Monette	4	4
WC	(Canada) JM Lin (Canada) N Muamba	4	4
(United States) M Giron (United States) T-S Kwiatkowski	6	6

Semifinals
1	(United Kingdom) L Bambridge (Republic of Ireland) D O'Hare	6	6
(Slovenia) B Rola (Denmark) M Torpegaard	4	2
(Japan) Y Takahashi (Japan) R Tokuda	3	6	[10]
(United States) M Giron (United States) T-S Kwiatkowski	6	1	[7]

Final
1	(United Kingdom) L Bambridge (Republic of Ireland) D O'Hare	6	6
(Japan) Y Takahashi (Japan) R Tokuda	2	2
