= Tennis at the 2011 Island Games =

- Date: 26 June to 1 July
- Edition: 11th
- Location: Ryde Lawn Tennis Club and Ryde Mead Tennis Club

Champions

Men's singles
- (Cayman Islands) Panav Jha

Women's singles
- (Gibraltar) Amanda Carreras

Men's doubles
- (Bermuda) Jenson Bascome/ (Bermuda) Gavin Manders

Women's doubles
- (Gibraltar) Amanda Carreras/ (Gibraltar) Lindsay De Haro-Sene

Mixed doubles
- (Åland) Linda Jansson/ (Åland) Peter Forsström

Men's team
- Cayman Islands

Women's team
- Gibraltar
← 2009 ·	Island Games	· 2013 →

Tennis at the 2011 Island Games was held from 26 June–1 July 2011 at the Ryde Lawn Tennis Club and Ryde Mead Tennis Club.

== Medal summary ==
=== Medal table ===
Rank	Nation	Gold	Silver	Bronze	Total
1	Gibraltar	3	2	1	6
2	Cayman Islands	2	0	0	2
3	Bermuda	1	2	1	4
4	Åland	1	0	0	1
5	Menorca	0	3	4	7
6	Isle of Man	0	0	2	2
7	Guernsey	0	0	1	1
7	Isle of Wight	0	0	1	1
7	Jersey	0	0	1	1
7	Saare County	0	0	1	1
Totals (10 entries)		7	7	12	26

=== Medal events ===
Event	Gold	Silver	Bronze
Men's singles	(Cayman Islands) Panav Jha	(Bermuda) Gavin Manders	(Jersey) James Connelly
Men's singles	(Cayman Islands) Panav Jha	(Bermuda) Gavin Manders	(Menorca) Jesus Curiel
Women's singles	(Gibraltar) Amanda Carreras	(Menorca) Rebeca Molero	(Bermuda) Tyler Smith
Women's singles	(Gibraltar) Amanda Carreras	(Menorca) Rebeca Molero	(Menorca) Gemma Triay Pons
Men's doubles	(Bermuda) Jenson Bascome (Bermuda) Gavin Manders	(Bermuda) Naim Azhar (Bermuda) David Thomas	(Menorca) Jesus Curiel (Menorca) Carlos Previ
Men's doubles	(Bermuda) Jenson Bascome (Bermuda) Gavin Manders	(Bermuda) Naim Azhar (Bermuda) David Thomas	(Saare County) Rauno Gull (Saare County) Mihkel Kruusmägi
Women's doubles	(Gibraltar) Amanda Carreras (Gibraltar) Lindsay De Haro-Sene	(Gibraltar) Bianca Taylor (Gibraltar) Lee Whitwell	(Isle of Wight) Linda Jones (Isle of Wight) Hannah Price
Women's doubles	(Gibraltar) Amanda Carreras (Gibraltar) Lindsay De Haro-Sene	(Gibraltar) Bianca Taylor (Gibraltar) Lee Whitwell	(Menorca) Sandra Moll (Menorca) Gemma Triay Pons
Mixed doubles	(Åland) Linda Jansson (Åland) Peter Forsström	(Gibraltar) Lionel Chipolina (Gibraltar) Lee Whitwell	(Gibraltar) Bianca Taylor (Gibraltar) James Taylor
Mixed doubles	(Åland) Linda Jansson (Åland) Peter Forsström	(Gibraltar) Lionel Chipolina (Gibraltar) Lee Whitwell	(Guernsey) Rob West (Guernsey) Chantelle Frith
Men's team	Cayman Islands	Menorca	Isle of Man
Women's team	Gibraltar	Menorca	Isle of Man
