= 2017 Winnipeg National Bank Challenger – Men's singles =

Men's singles
- 2017 Winnipeg National Bank Challenger

Final
- Champion: (Slovenia) Blaž Kavčič
- Runner-up: (Canada) Peter Polansky
- Score: 7–5, 3–6, 7–5

Events
Singles	men	women
Doubles	men	women
- Winnipeg Challenger

Go Soeda was the defending champion but chose not to defend his title.

Blaž Kavčič won the title after defeating Peter Polansky 7–5, 3–6, 7–5 in the final.

== Seeds ==
1. (Slovenia) Blaž Kavčič (champion)
2. (Canada) Peter Polansky (final)
3. (Japan) Tatsuma Ito (first round)
4. (Japan) Yasutaka Uchiyama (semifinals)
5. (Japan) Hiroki Moriya (first round)
6. (Canada) Steven Diez (first round)
7. (Canada) Brayden Schnur (quarterfinals)
8. (Slovenia) Blaž Rola (second round)

== Draw ==
Key

- Q = Qualifier
- WC = Wild card
- LL = Lucky loser
- Alt = Alternate
- ITF = ITF entry
- PR = Protected ranking
- SR = Special ranking
- SE = Special exempt
- JE = Junior exempt
- JR = Junior Accelerator Programme entrant
- CO = College Accelerator Programme entrant
- NG = Next Gen Accelerator Program entrant
- w/o = Walkover
- r = Retired
- d = Defaulted

=== Finals ===
Semifinals
1	(Slovenia) Blaž Kavčič	7^{7}	6
(Israel) Edan Leshem	6^{0}	3
4	(Japan) Yasutaka Uchiyama	4	6	2
2	(Canada) Peter Polansky	6	4	6

Final
1	(Slovenia) Blaž Kavčič	7	3	7
2	(Canada) Peter Polansky	5	6	5

=== Top half ===
First round
1	(Slovenia) B Kavčič	4	6	7
(Canada) F Dancevic	6	3	5
(Japan) K Uchida	6	6
Q	(Venezuela) LD Martínez	3	1
(Australia) B Mousley	6	6
WC	(Canada) Hugo Di Feo	1	1
(United States) R Sarmiento	6	6
6	(Canada) S Diez	1	4
3	(Japan) T Ito	2	6^{6}
Q	(United States) R Schneider	6	7^{8}
(Israel) E Leshem	7^{7}	2	6
(Italy) A Bega	6^{3}	6	3
(Japan) Y Takahashi	6	6
WC	(Canada) JM Lin	2	0
WC	(Canada) Samuel Monette	6	6
5	(Japan) H Moriya	0	1

Second round
1	(Slovenia) B Kavčič	6	6
(Japan) K Uchida	3	4
(Australia) B Mousley	6	6^{5}	4
(United States) R Sarmiento	1	7^{7}	6
Q	(United States) R Schneider	6	3	3
(Israel) E Leshem	3	6	6
(Japan) Y Takahashi	7	2	6
WC	(Canada) S Monette	5	6	2

Quarterfinals
1	(Slovenia) B Kavčič	6	6
(United States) R Sarmiento	2	2
(Israel) E Leshem	7^{7}	6
(Japan) Y Takahashi	6^{4}	3

Semifinals
1	(Slovenia) B Kavčič	7^{7}	6
(Israel) E Leshem	6^{0}	3

=== Bottom half ===
First round
8	(Slovenia) B Rola	7^{7}	7^{8}
(Canada) P Bester	6^{4}	6^{6}
(Australia) M Purcell	6	6
(Chinese Taipei) T Chen	2	4
(New Zealand) F Tearney	3	1
(United States) M Giron	6	6
(United States) S Bangoura	6	4	3
4	(Japan) Y Uchiyama	3	6	6
7	(Canada) B Schnur	6	7^{7}
(Canada) F Peliwo	2	6^{4}
(United States) A Sarkissian	6^{2}	4
Q	(United Kingdom) L Bambridge	7^{7}	6
WC	(Canada) Nicaise Muamba	1	2
Q	(United States) A Rybakov	6	6
(United States) C Harrison	3	2
2	(Canada) P Polansky	6	6

Second round
8	(Slovenia) B Rola	4	4
(Australia) M Purcell	6	6
(United States) M Giron	4	6	2
4	(Japan) Y Uchiyama	6	4	6
7	(Canada) B Schnur	6	6
Q	(United Kingdom) L Bambridge	4	4
Q	(United States) A Rybakov	4	4
2	(Canada) P Polansky	6	6

Quarterfinals
(Australia) M Purcell	4	0
4	(Japan) Y Uchiyama	6	6
7	(Canada) B Schnur	3	7^{8}	6^{2}
2	(Canada) P Polansky	6	6^{6}	7^{7}

Semifinals
4	(Japan) Y Uchiyama	4	6	2
2	(Canada) P Polansky	6	4	6
