= Lauren Herring =

American tennis player

- Full name: Lauren Herring Cole
- Country (sports): United States
- Born: July 23, 1993 (age 33) Greenville, North Carolina, United States
- Height: 1.70 m (5 ft 7 in)
- Plays: Right (two-handed backhand)
- Prize money: $23,698

Singles
- Career record: 62–49
- Career titles: 2 ITF
- Highest ranking: No. 545 (June 13, 2016)

Doubles
- Career record: 38–37
- Career titles: 1 ITF
- Highest ranking: No. 404 (July 11, 2016)

Grand Slam doubles results
- US Open: 1R (2010)

Lauren Herring Cole (born July 23, 1993) is an American former tennis player.

She has career-high WTA rankings of 545 in singles, achieved in June 2016, and 404 in doubles, reached in July 2016.

Herring alongside Grace Min was given a wildcard for the women's doubles draw of the 2010 US Open where they lost in the first round to Dominika Cibulková and Anastasia Pavlyuchenkova.

== ITF Circuit finals ==
=== Singles: 5 (2 titles, 3 runner-ups) ===
Legend $25,000 tournaments $10,000 tournaments	Finals by surface Hard (1–1) Clay (1–2)

Result	Date	Tournament	Surface	Opponent	Score
Win	Oct 2010	ITF Amelia Island, United States	Clay	(United States) Catherine Harrison	6–2, 6–3
Loss	Jun 2015	ITF Charlotte, United States	Clay	(United States) Caroline Price	2–6, 6–3, 3–6
Win	Jul 2015	ITF Evansville, United States	Hard	(United States) Andie K. Daniell	4–6, 6–2, 6–0
Loss	Aug 2015	ITF Austin, US	Hard	(United States) Francesca Di Lorenzo	6–4, 6–7^{(2)}, 2–6
Loss	Jun 2016	ITF Buffalo, US	Clay	(United States) Caroline Dolehide	1–6, 5–7

=== Doubles: 7 (1 title, 6 runner-ups) ===
Legend $25,000 tournaments $10,000 tournaments	Finals by surface Hard (1–3) Clay (0–3)

Result	No.	Date	Tournament	Surface	Partner	Opponents	Score
Loss	1	5 June 2010	ITF Hilton Head, US	Hard	(United States) Brooke Bolender	(United States) Jaqueline Cako (United States) Erica Krisan	1–6, 4–6
Loss	2	3 August 2013	ITF Fort Worth, US	Hard	(United States) Mia King	(United States) Roxanne Ellison (United States) Sierra Ellison	3–6, 4–6
Loss	3	13 June 2015	ITF Charlotte, US	Clay	(Australia) Ellen Perez	(Brazil) Maria Fernanda Alves (Mexico) Renata Zarazua	4–6, 7–6^{(6)}, [8–10]
Loss	4	26 July 2015	ITF Evansville, US	Hard	(United States) Kennedy Shaffer	(Thailand) Nicha Lertpitaksinchai (Thailand) Peangtarn Plipuech	2–6, 3–6
Loss	5	10 October 2015	ITF Hilton Head, US	Clay	(United States) Alexa Bortles	(United States) Madeleine Kobelt (Russia) Nika Kukhartchuk	2–6, 6–3, [8–10]
Loss	6	9 April 2016	ITF Jackson, US	Clay	(United States) Yuli Chiang	(Canada) Sharon Fichman (Australia) Jarmila Wolfe	2–6, 3–6
Win	1	25 June 2016	ITF Baton Rouge, US	Hard	(Australia) Ellen Perez	(United States) Jamie Loeb (United States) Ingrid Neel	6–3, 6–3
