= Tennis at the 2015 Island Games =

Tennis at the 2015 Island Games was held at the Caesarean Tennis Club, Jersey from 28 June to 3 July.

== Medal table ==
* Host nation (Jersey)

Rank	Nation	Gold	Silver	Bronze	Total
1	Guernsey	3	1	2	6
2	Jersey*	2	3	4	9
3	Isle of Man	2	2	1	5
4	Isle of Wight	0	1	1	2
5	Gotland	0	0	3	3
5	Åland	0	0	3	3
Totals (6 entries)		7	7	14	28

== Results ==
Event	Gold	Silver	Bronze
Men’s singles	Billy Harris (IOM)	Scott Clayton (JEY)	Stuart Parker (JEY)
Men’s singles	Billy Harris (IOM)	Scott Clayton (JEY)	Patrick Ogier (GGY)
Men’s doubles	Jersey; Scott Clayton; James Connelly	Guernsey; Dominic McLuskey; Patrick Ogier	Gotland; Björn Carlnäs; Karl Lindberg
Men’s doubles	Jersey; Scott Clayton; James Connelly	Guernsey; Dominic McLuskey; Patrick Ogier	Jersey; Jeremy Cross; Stuart Parker
Women’s singles	Ella Taylor (GGY)	Reegan Greenwood (IOW)	Tzvetelina Havrén (Gotland)
Women’s singles	Ella Taylor (GGY)	Reegan Greenwood (IOW)	Natasha Forrest (JEY)
Women's doubles	Isle of Man; Karen Faragher; Laura Feely	Jersey; Clare Clarke; Rebecca Edwards	Jersey; Natasha Forrest; Eva Hurst
Women's doubles	Isle of Man; Karen Faragher; Laura Feely	Jersey; Clare Clarke; Rebecca Edwards	Åland Islands; Pauline Nordlund; Malin Ringbom
Mixed doubles	Guernsey; Ella Taylor; Rob West	Isle of Man; Karen Faragher; Bruce Wagstaff	Gotland; Alec Arho Havrén; Tzvetelina Havrén
Mixed doubles	Guernsey; Ella Taylor; Rob West	Isle of Man; Karen Faragher; Bruce Wagstaff	Åland Islands; Peter Forsström; Malin Ringbom
Men's Team	Jersey; Scott Clayton; James Connelly; James Faudemer; Stuart Parker	Isle of Man; Marc Chinn; Billy Harris; Jack Hedges; Bruce Wagstaff	Åland Islands; Dan Andersson; Otto Byman; Peter Forsström; Tim Schauman
Men's Team	Jersey; Scott Clayton; James Connelly; James Faudemer; Stuart Parker	Isle of Man; Marc Chinn; Billy Harris; Jack Hedges; Bruce Wagstaff	Guernsey; Dominic McLuskey; Patrick Ogier; Nico Robinson; Rob West
Women's Team	Guernsey; Georgina Denton; Joanna Dyer; Chantelle Frith; Ella Taylor	Jersey; Clare Clarke; Rebecca Edwards; Natasha Forrest; Eva Hurst	Isle of Man; Karen Faragher; Laura Feely; Katie Harris; Hannah Snidal
Women's Team	Guernsey; Georgina Denton; Joanna Dyer; Chantelle Frith; Ella Taylor	Jersey; Clare Clarke; Rebecca Edwards; Natasha Forrest; Eva Hurst	Isle of Wight; Millie Coombes; Reegan Greenwood
