= Billy Harris (tennis) =

British tennis player (born 1995)

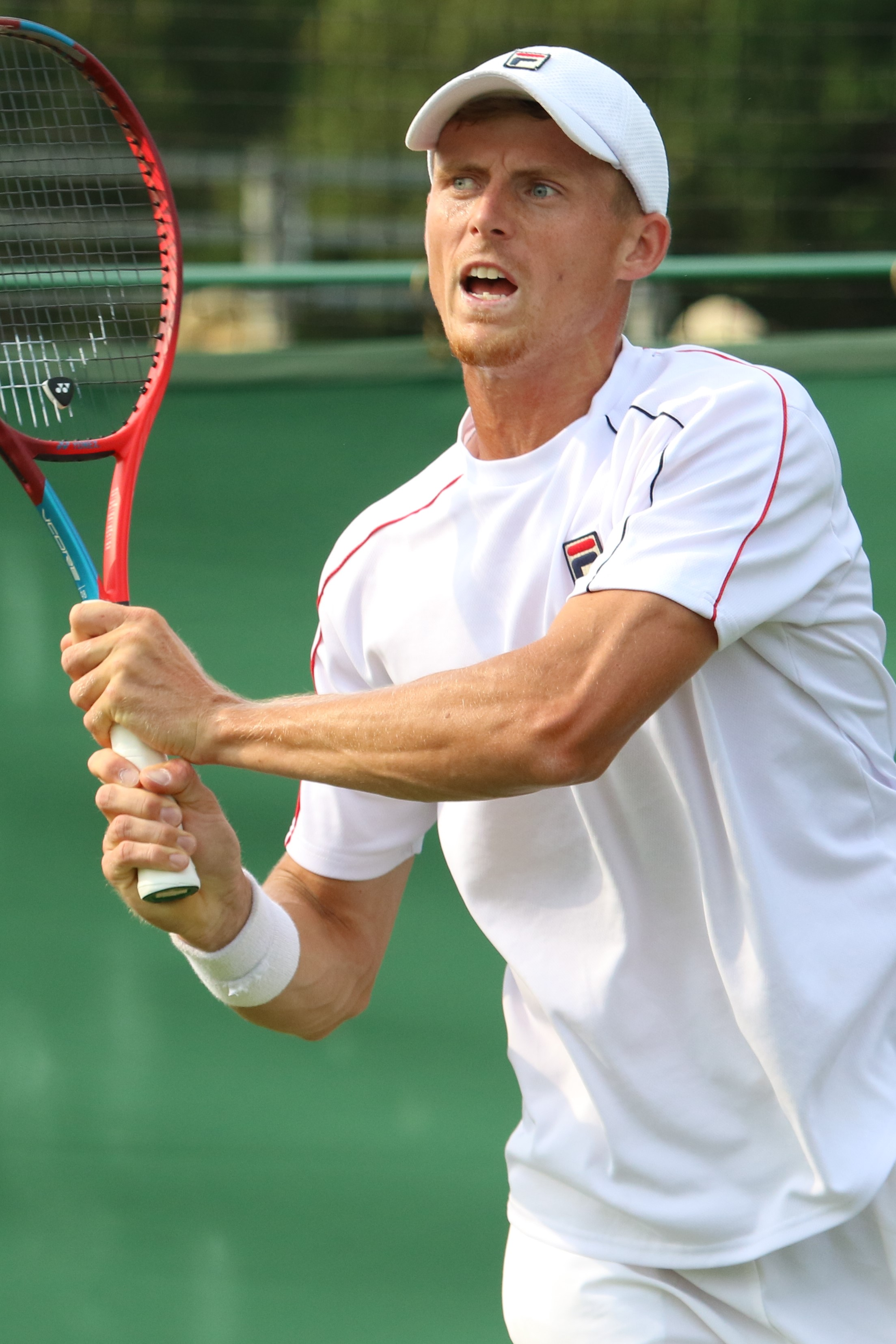
- Harris at the 2023 Wimbledon Championships
- Country (sports): United Kingdom
- Residence: Isle of Man
- Born: 25 January 1995 (age 31) Nottingham, England
- Height: 1.93 m (6 ft 4 in)
- Plays: Right-handed (two-handed backhand)
- Coach: Geoff Harris, Leon Smith
- Prize money: US $1,993,866

Singles
- Career record: 12–22
- Career titles: 2 ATP Challenger
- Highest ranking: No. 101 (9 September 2024)
- Current ranking: No. 171 (16 November 2026)

Grand Slam singles results
- Australian Open: Q3 (2025)
- French Open: Q3 (2024)
- Wimbledon: 2R (2025)
- US Open: 1R (2025)

Doubles
- Career record: 1–3
- Career titles: 1 ATP Challenger
- Highest ranking: No. 265 (12 February 2024)
- Current ranking: No. 847 (16 November 2026)

Grand Slam doubles results
- Wimbledon: 2R (2025)

Grand Slam mixed doubles results
- Wimbledon: 1R (2026)
Medal record
Representing Isle of Man
Island Games
Gold medal – first place	2013 Bermuda	Men's singles
Gold medal – first place	2013 Bermuda	Mixed doubles
Gold medal – first place	2015 Jersey	Men's singles
Silver medal – second place	2015 Jersey	Men's team
Bronze medal – third place	2011 Isle of Wight	Men's team
- Last updated on: 16 November 2026.

Billy Harris (born 25 January 1995) is a British tennis player. He has a career-high ATP singles ranking of world No. 101 achieved on 9 September 2024 and a career-high doubles ranking of No. 265 achieved on 12 February 2024.

== Career ==
=== 2022-2023: ATP Tour debut, first win ===
Harris won his first ATP Challenger doubles title at the 2022 Winnipeg National Bank Challenger playing with Kelsey Stevenson, defeating Max Schnur and John-Patrick Smith in the final.

He reached his first Challenger singles final at the inaugural edition of the 2023 Challenger Club Els Gorchs in Las Franquesas del Valles, Spain, as a qualifier where he lost to second seed Hugo Grenier.

Harris made his ATP Tour debut at the 2023 Sofia Open, where as a qualifier, he defeated defending champion Marc-Andrea Huesler in the first round, before losing his next match to third seed Jan-Lennard Struff.

=== 2024: Wimbledon, Davis Cup & Masters debuts ===
Given a wildcard entry into the Surbiton Trophy, Harris made it through to the semifinals with wins over eighth seed Shang Juncheng, qualifier Tristan Schoolkate and Mikhail Kukushkin. His run was ended in the last four by eventual champion Lloyd Harris.

Entering as an alternate at the Nottingham Open Challenger, he overcame Coleman Wong, João Fonseca, and Mikhail Kukushkin to reach the semifinals, where he lost to qualifier Charles Broom.

Ranked No. 162, Harris received a wildcard for the main draw at Queen's Club and reached his first ATP Tour quarterfinal. En route, he defeated Tomás Martín Etcheverry and qualifier Giovanni Mpetshi Perricard. Despite losing in the last eight to Lorenzo Musetti, he broke into the top 150 in the rankings on 24 June 2024. His good form continued at the next grass court tournament, the Eastbourne International, recording wins over fellow wildcard Jacob Fearnley, lucky loser Charles Broom and Flavio Cobolli to make it through to his first ATP Tour semifinal, and as a result, reached the top 125 in the singles rankings. He lost to Max Purcell in three sets.

For his Grand Slam tournament debut, he received a wildcard for Wimbledon. Harris lost in the first round to Spain's Jaume Munar. He qualified for the main draw at the Hall of Fame Open in Newport, Rhode Island, going on to defeat Gabriel Diallo in the first round. He lost his next match to Mackenzie McDonald.

Harris made his debut for the Great Britain Davis Cup Team against Finland in Manchester in September, defeating Otto Virtanen in straight sets.

=== 2025-2026: Major win, two Challenger titles ===
Harris started his 2025 season representing Great Britain at the United Cup in Australia, where he lost all three of his matches to Tomás Martín Etcheverry, Alex de Minaur and Hubert Hurkacz. Wins over Yuta Shimizu and Carlos Taberner saw him reach the final round of qualifying at the 2025 Australian Open for the first time, but a defeat to Kamil Majchrzak meant he missed out on a place in the main-draw. He represented Great Britain in their Davis Cup qualifier against Japan, but was beaten in both his matches against Yoshihito Nishioka and Kei Nishikori as the team lost the tie 3-2.

In February 2025, Harris made it through to the semifinals at the Chennai Open Challenger, where his run was ended by Elias Ymer. The following week he defeated Eric Vanshelboim, James McCabe, Elias Ymer and Tristan Schoolkate to reach his second Challenger final at the Delhi Open, where he lost to Kyrian Jacquet. Completing a successful three weeks in India, Harris got to the semifinals at the Bengaluru Open Challenger, before losing to Brandon Holt. The following month, Harris qualified in Miami making his debut at the tournament. He lost to wildcard entrant Eliot Spizzirri in the first round.

In June 2025, he gained entry into the main-draw at the Eastbourne Open as a lucky loser and defeated fellow Briton Cameron Norrie and qualifier Mattia Bellucci to reach back-to-back quarterfinals at the tournament. Harris lost his last eight match to fourth seed Ugo Humbert. The following week at Wimbledon he won his first match at a major, defeating Dušan Lajović in straight sets to reach the second round, where he lost to Nuno Borges.

Harris qualified for the 2025 Washington Open, but lost to Cameron Norrie in the first round. Despite being defeated by Coleman Wong in the final round of qualifying at the 2025 US Open, he made his main-draw debut at the event after being awarded a lucky loser place. Harris was unable to make the most of his reprieve, losing in the first round to 25th seed Félix Auger-Aliassime in straight sets.

In September 2025, Harris won his first ATP Challenger singles title at the Cassis Open Provence, defeating Daniil Glinka in the final.

In June 2026, he qualified for the main-draw at Wimbledon, but lost to 19th seed Karen Khachanov in the first round.

Harris won his second ATP Challenger singles title at the 2026 Matsuyama Challenger, defeating Hsu Yu-hsiou in the final.

== Performance timeline ==
Key
W	F	SF	QF	#R	RR	Q#	DNQ	A	NH

(W) winner; (F) finalist; (SF) semifinalist; (QF) quarterfinalist; (#R) rounds 4, 3, 2, 1; (RR) round-robin stage; (Q#) qualification round; (DNQ) did not qualify; (A) absent; (NH) not held; (SR) strike rate (events won / competed); (W–L) win–loss record.
To avoid confusion and double counting, these charts are updated at the conclusion of a tournament or when the player's participation has ended.

=== Singles ===
Tournament	2022	2023	2024	2025	2026	SR	W–L	Win%
Grand Slam tournaments
Australian Open	A	A	Q2	Q3	Q1	0 / 0	0–0	–
French Open	A	A	Q3	Q1	Q1	0 / 0	0–0	–
Wimbledon	Q1	Q3	1R	2R	1R	0 / 3	1–3	25%
US Open	A	A	Q3	1R	Q2	0 / 1	0–1	0%
Win–loss	0–0	0–0	0–1	1–2	0–1	0 / 4	1–4	20%
National representation
Davis Cup	A	A	RR	WG1	A	0 / 1	1–2	–
ATP Masters 1000
Indian Wells Masters	A	A	A	Q1	Q1	0 / 0	0–0	–
Miami Open	A	A	A	1R	Q1	0 / 1	0–1	0%
Monte-Carlo Masters	A	A	A	A	A	0 / 0	0–0	–
Madrid Open	A	A	A	Q1	Q1	0 / 0	0-0	–
Italian Open	A	A	A	Q1	Q1	0 / 0	0–0	–
Canadian Open	A	A	Q2	A	A	0 / 0	0–0	–
Cincinnati Open	A	A	A	A	Q1	0 / 0	0–0	–
Shanghai Masters	A	A	1R	Q2	Q1	0 / 1	0–1	0%
Paris Masters	A	A	A	A	A	0 / 0	0–0	–
Win–loss	0–0	0–0	0–1	0–1	0–0	0 / 2	0–2	0%
Career statistics
Tournaments	0	1	6	8	0	15		
Overall win–loss	0–0	1–1	7–6	3–13	1–2	12–22		
Year-end ranking	355	199	125	128				

== Challenger and World Tennis Tour Finals ==
=== Singles: 15 (7 titles, 8 runner-ups) ===
Legend ATP Challengers (2–2) ITF Futures/World Tennis Tour (5–6)	Titles by surface Hard (4–3) Clay (3–4) Grass (0–1)

Result	W–L	Date	Tournament	Tier	Surface	Opponent	Score
Loss	0–1	Dec 2020	M15 Antalya, Turkey	World Tennis Tour	Clay	(Ukraine) Georgii Kravchenko	2–6, 3–6
Win	1–1	Oct 2021	M15 Sozopol, Bulgaria	World Tennis Tour	Hard	(Germany) Kai Wehnelt	6–4, 6–1
Loss	1–2	Oct 2021	M15 Sozopol, Bulgaria	World Tennis Tour	Hard	(Russia) Yan Bondarevskiy	2–6, 3–6
Win	2–2	Oct 2021	M15 Antalya, Turkey	World Tennis Tour	Clay	(United Kingdom) Felix Gill	6–3, 1–6, 7–5
Loss	2–3	Nov 2021	M15 Antalya, Turkey	World Tennis Tour	Clay	(Poland) Daniel Michalski	6–2, 1–6, 3–6
Win	3–3	Dec 2021	M15 Antalya, Turkey	World Tennis Tour	Clay	(France) Arthur Fils	6–2, 1–6, 6–4
Win	4–3	Dec 2021	M15 Antalya, Turkey	World Tennis Tour	Clay	(Ecuador) Cayetano March	6–1, 6–4
Loss	4–4	Dec 2021	M15 Antalya, Turkey	World Tennis Tour	Clay	(Sweden) Dragoș Nicolae Mădăraș	5–7, 1–6
Loss	4–5	Mar 2022	M25 Antalya, Turkey	World Tennis Tour	Clay	(Ukraine) Oleksii Krutykh	4–6, 6–4, 2–6
Win	5–5	May 2022	M25 Nottingham, United Kingdom	World Tennis Tour	Hard	(Israel) Edan Leshem	6–4, 6–3
Loss	5–6	Mar 2023	Les Franqueses del Vallès, Spain	Challenger	Hard	(France) Hugo Grenier	6–3, 1–6, 6–7^{(3–7)}
Loss	5–7	Jul 2023	M25 Nottingham, United Kingdom	World Tennis Tour	Grass	(United Kingdom) Toby Samuel	4–6, 4–6
Loss	5–8	Feb 2025	New Delhi, India	Challenger	Hard	(France) Kyrian Jacquet	4–6, 2–6
Win	6–8	Sep 2025	Cassis, France	Challenger	Hard	(Estonia) Daniil Glinka	3–6, 7–5, 6–3
Win	7–8	Nov 2026	Matsuyama, Japan	Challenger	Hard	(Chinese Taipei) Yu Hsiou Hsu	3–6, 6–1, 7–6^{(8–6)}

=== Doubles: 14 (8–6) ===
Legend ATP Challengers (1–0) ITF Futures/World Tennis Tour (7–6)	Titles by surface Hard (4–3) Clay (4–3) Grass (0–0)

Result	W–L	Date	Tournament	Tier	Surface	Partner	Opponents	Score
Win	1–0	Aug 2015	Belgium F9, Eupen	Futures	Clay	(United Kingdom) Evan Hoyt	(Belgium) Sander Gillé (Belgium) Joran Vliegen	7–6^{(7–5)}, 6–3
Win	2–0	Nov 2015	Great Britain F10, Tipton	Futures	Hard	(United Kingdom) Evan Hoyt	(United Kingdom) Lloyd Glasspool (United Kingdom) Joshua Ward-Hibbert	4–6, 6–3, [11–9]
Loss	2–1	Sep 2016	Belgium F12, Middelkerke	Futures	Clay	(Germany) Jakob Sude	(Australia) Adam Taylor (Australia) Jason Taylor	0–6, 2–6
Loss	2–2	Oct 2016	Great Britain F4, Loughborough	Futures	Hard	(Poland) Mateusz Terczyński	(United Kingdom) Scott Clayton (United Kingdom) Jonny O'Mara	3–6, 2–6
Win	3–2	Sep 2017	Belgium F12, Middelkerke	Futures	Clay	(Finland) Patrik Niklas-Salminen	(Netherlands) Michiel de Krom (Netherlands) Stephan Fransen	6–7^{(7–9)}, 7–5, [10–3]
Loss	3–3	Mar 2018	Italy F2, Santa Margherita di Pula	Futures	Clay	(Poland) Maciej Rajski	(Italy) Gianluca Di Nicola (Italy) Walter Trusendi	5–7, 3–6
Loss	3–4	Oct 2019	M25 Tây Ninh, Vietnam	World Tennis Tour	Hard	(United States) Samuel Beren	(Japan) Rio Noguchi (Russia) Alexey Zakharov	7–6^{(7–5)}, 4–6, [4–10]
Win	4–4	Mar 2020	M15 Vale Do Lobo, Portugal	World Tennis Tour	Hard	(Republic of Ireland) Peter Bothwell	(Spain) Albert Roglan (Spain) Benjamín Winter López	6–3, 6–4
Win	5–4	Jan 2021	M15 Antalya, Turkey	World Tennis Tour	Clay	(Russia) Yan Sabanin	(Bulgaria) Plamen Milushev (Bulgaria) Simeon Terziev	7–6^{(7–5)}, 6–0
Loss	5–5	May 2021	M15 Heraklion, Greece	World Tennis Tour	Hard	(United Kingdom) George Houghton	(United Kingdom) Julian Cash (United States) Reese Stalder	7–6^{(8–6)}, 0–6, [8–10]
Loss	5–6	Jul 2021	M15 L'Aquila, Italy	World Tennis Tour	Clay	(Italy) Luciano Darderi	(Argentina) Juan Ignacio Galarza (Argentina) Tomás Lipovšek Puches	3–6, 1–6
Win	6–6	Jul 2021	M15 Perugia, Italy	World Tennis Tour	Clay	(Italy) Luciano Darderi	(Argentina) Juan Ignacio Galarza (Argentina) Tomás Lipovšek Puches	Walkover
Win	7–6	Oct 2021	M15 Sozopol, Bulgaria	World Tennis Tour	Hard	(Bulgaria) Alexander Donski	(Russia) Yan Bondarevskiy (Germany) Kai Wehnelt	6–1, 6–4
Win	8–6	Jul 2022	Winnipeg, Canada	Challenger	Hard	(Canada) Kelsey Stevenson	(United States) Max Schnur (Australia) John-Patrick Smith	2–6, 7–6^{(11–9)}, [10–8]
