= Kelsey Stevenson =

Canadian tennis player

- Country (sports): Canada
- Born: 29 May 1990 (age 36) Toronto, Canada
- Height: 1.83 m (6 ft 0 in)
- Plays: Right-handed (one-handed backhand)
- Prize money: $124,700

Singles
- Career record: 0–0
- Career titles: 0; 0 Challenger, 1 Futures
- Highest ranking: No. 654 (30 November 2020)

Doubles
- Career record: 0–0
- Career titles: 0; 1 Challenger, 7 Futures
- Highest ranking: No. 196 (20 May 2024)
- Current ranking: No. 334 (8 November 2025)
- Last updated on: 10 November 2025.

Kelsey Stevenson (born 29 May 1990) is a Canadian tennis player.

Stevenson has a career high ATP singles ranking of No. 654 achieved on 30 November 2020 and a career high doubles ranking of No. 196 achieved on 20 May 2024. Stevenson spent a lot of 2024 as the number one professional doubles player in Canada.

Stevenson has won 1 ATP Challenger doubles title at the 2022 Winnipeg National Bank Challenger with Billy Harris. He has also won 1 ITF Futures singles title as well as 7 ITF Futures events in doubles.

Stevenson made his ATP tour main draw debut at the 2023 National Bank Open, where he was granted a wildcard entry into the men's doubles draw alongside fellow Canadian Benjamin Sigouin. The pair lost in the first round to former No. 1 Nicolas Mahut and Canadian Vasek Pospisil 5–7, 4–6. Stevenson was named to the Canada Davis Cup team for the first time in his career during the group stage in September 2023.

== ATP Challenger and ITF Futures finals ==
=== Singles: 2 (1–1) ===
Legend ATP Challengers (0–0) ITF Futures/World Tennis Tour (1–1)	Titles by surface Hard (1–1) Clay (0–0) Grass (0–0)

Result	W–L	Date	Tournament	Tier	Surface	Opponent	Score
Loss	0–1	Oct 2018	Thailand F5, Hua Hin	Futures	Hard	(Japan) Shintaro Imai	6–7^{(4–7)}, 1–6
Win	1–1	Nov 2019	M15 Maputo, Mozambique	World Tennis Tour	Hard	(Spain) David Pérez Sanz	7–6^{(7–3)}, 6–2

=== Doubles: 18 (8–10) ===
Legend ATP Challengers (1–0) ITF Futures/World Tennis Tour (7–10)	Titles by surface Hard (8–8) Clay (0–1) Grass (0–0)

Result	W–L	Date	Tournament	Tier	Surface	Partner	Opponents	Score
Win	1–0	Nov 2011	Thailand F5, Phuket	Futures	Hard	(China) Li Zhe	(Thailand) Weerapat Doakmaiklee (Thailand) Kirati Siributwong	6–4, 4–6, [10–3]
Loss	1–1	Nov 2014	Cambodia F1, Phnom Penh	Futures	Hard	(Cambodia) Bun Kenny	(Philippines) Jeson Patrombon (Indonesia) David Agung Susanto	7–5, 3–6, [7–10]
Loss	1–2	Feb 2017	Indonesia F1, Jakarta	Futures	Hard	(India) Karunuday Singh	(Australia) Aaron Addison (United Kingdom) Rhett Purcell	Walkover
Win	2–2	Nov 2017	Vietnam F3, Thủ Dầu Một	Futures	Hard	(United States) Tyler Lu	(Japan) Issei Okamura (Japan) Shunrou Takeshima	7–6^{(7–5)}, 7–5
Win	3–2	Sep 2018	Thailand F3, Nonthaburi	Futures	Hard	(Thailand) Pruchya Isaro	(Chinese Taipei) Lin Wei-De (Thailand) Wishaya Trongcharoenchaikul	6–3, 4–6, [10–7]
Win	4–2	Sep 2019	M15 Hua Hin, Thailand	World Tennis Tour	Hard	(Chinese Taipei) Ray Ho	(United Kingdom) George Loffhagen (New Zealand) Ajeet Rai	7–6^{(7–4)}, 6–2
Loss	4–3	Sep 2019	M15 Antalya, Turkey	World Tennis Tour	Clay	(India) Adil Kalyanpur	(Poland) Jan Zieliński (Poland) Kacper Żuk	6–3, 1–6, [8–10]
Win	5–3	Nov 2019	M15 Maputo, Mozambique	World Tennis Tour	Hard	(Canada) Raheel Manji	(South Africa) Vasilios Caripi (South Africa) Vaughn Hunter	6–4, 7–5
Loss	5–4	Feb 2020	M15 Sharm El Sheikh, Egypt	World Tennis Tour	Hard	(Canada) Raheel Manji	(Netherlands) Stijn Pel (Czech Republic) Robin Staněk	6–7^{(5–7)}, 6–3, [8–10]
Loss	5–5	Jul 2021	M15 Monastir, Tunisia	World Tennis Tour	Hard	(Russia) Timur Kiyamov	(South Korea) Hong Seong-chan (South Korea) Nam Ji-sung	2–6, 4–6
Loss	5–6	Mar 2022	M15 Sharm El Sheikh, Egypt	World Tennis Tour	Hard	(Philippines) Francis Alcantara	(Italy) Francesco Vilardo (Italy) Samuel Vincent Ruggeri	6–2, 5–7, [3–10]
Loss	5–7	Mar 2022	M15 Sharm El Sheikh, Egypt	World Tennis Tour	Hard	(Philippines) Francis Alcantara	Petr Bar Biryukov; Marat Sharipov	7–6^{(8–6)}, 3–6, [8–10]
Win	6–7	May 2022	M15 Heraklion, Greece	World Tennis Tour	Hard	(Australia) Aaron Addison	(Bulgaria) Gabriel Donev (Bulgaria) Simon Anthony Ivanov	7–6^{(7–3)}, 7–6^{(7–4)}
Loss	6–8	Jul 2022	M25 Idanha-a-Nova, Portugal	World Tennis Tour	Hard	(Chinese Taipei) Ray Ho	(Japan) Rio Noguchi (Greece) Alexandros Skorilas	7–6^{(7–4)}, 3–6, [3–10]
Win	7–8	Jul 2022	Winnipeg, Canada	Challenger	Hard	(United Kingdom) Billy Harris	(United States) Max Schnur (Australia) John-Patrick Smith	2–6, 7–6^{(11–9)}, [10–8]
Loss	7–9	Dec 2022	M15 Sharm El Sheikh, Egypt	World Tennis Tour	Hard	(United Kingdom) Scott Duncan	Semen Voronin; Petr Bar Biryukov	2–6, 7–6^{(7–3)}, [7–10]
Win	8–9	Dec 2022	M15 Sharm El Sheikh, Egypt	World Tennis Tour	Hard	(United Kingdom) Scott Duncan	Yan Bondarevskiy; Alexandr Binda	6–4, 6–4
Loss	8–10	Dec 2022	M15 Sharm El Sheikh, Egypt	World Tennis Tour	Hard	(Italy) Gabriele Pennaforti	Marat Sharipov (Kazakhstan) Grigoriy Lomakin	Walkover
