= Winnipeg Challenger =

Winnipeg National Bank Challenger
- 2026 Winnipeg National Bank Challenger

Tournament information
- Founded: 2013; 13 years ago
- Location: Winnipeg, Manitoba; Canada
- Venue: Winnipeg Lawn Tennis Club
- Surface: Hard – outdoors
- Website: Official website
ATP Tour
- Category: ATP Challenger Tour
- Draw: 32S (17Q) / 16D (0Q)
- Prize money: $75,000
WTA Tour
- Category: ITF Women's Circuit
- Draw: 32S (30Q) / 15D (0Q)
- Prize money: $25,000

The Winnipeg National Bank Challenger is a tennis tournament for professionals played on outdoor hardcourts. It is currently part of the ATP Challenger Tour. It has been held annually in Winnipeg, Manitoba in Canada since 2016 for men. It was part of the ITF Women's Circuit from 2013 until 2018 for women.

== Past finals ==
=== Men's singles ===
Year	Champion	Runner-up	Score
2026	(United Kingdom) Toby Samuel	(Canada) Liam Draxl	6–4, 6–2
2025	(Canada) Liam Draxl	(Belgium) Alexander Blockx	1–6, 6–3, 6–4
2024	(France) Benjamin Bonzi	(Japan) Sho Shimabukuro	5–7, 6–1, 6–4
2023	(United Kingdom) Ryan Peniston	(Switzerland) Leandro Riedi	6–4, 4–6, 6–4
2022	(Ecuador) Emilio Gómez	(Canada) Alexis Galarneau	6–3, 7–6^{(7–4)}
2020–2021	Not held		
2019	(Slovakia) Norbert Gombos	(Canada) Brayden Schnur	7–6^{(7–3)}, 6–3
2018	(Australia) Jason Kubler	(Austria) Lucas Miedler	6–1, 6–1
2017	(Slovenia) Blaž Kavčič	(Canada) Peter Polansky	7–5, 3–6, 7–5
2016	(Japan) Go Soeda	(Slovenia) Blaž Kavčič	6–7^{(4–7)}, 6–4, 6–2

=== Women's singles ===
Year	Champion	Runner-up	Score
2018	(Canada) Rebecca Marino	(Israel) Julia Glushko	7–6^{(7–3)}, 7–6^{(7–4)}
2017	(United States) Caroline Dolehide	(Japan) Mayo Hibi	6–3, 6–4
2016	(United States) Francesca Di Lorenzo	(Canada) Erin Routliffe	6–4, 6–1
2015	(United States) Kristie Ahn	(Canada) Sharon Fichman	6–2, 7–5
2014	(Austria) Patricia Mayr-Achleitner	(Japan) Mayo Hibi	6–2, 6–2
2013	(United Kingdom) Johanna Konta	(United Kingdom) Samantha Murray	6–3, 6–1

=== Men's doubles ===
Year	Champions	Runners-up	Score
2026	(United States) Daniel Milavsky (United States) Braden Shick	(United States) Joshua Sheehy (United States) Tyler Zink	6–3, 3–6, [10–7]
2025	(United States) Keshav Chopra (United States) Andres Martin	(Japan) Naoki Nakagawa (South Africa) Kris van Wyk	7–6^{(7–2)}, 3–6, [10–3]
2024	(United States) Christian Harrison (United States) Cannon Kingsley	(Japan) Yuta Shimizu (Japan) Kaichi Uchida	6–1, 6–4
2023	(Canada) Gabriel Diallo (Switzerland) Leandro Riedi	(Canada) Juan Carlos Aguilar (Canada) Taha Baadi	6–2, 6–3
2022	(United Kingdom) Billy Harris (Canada) Kelsey Stevenson	(United States) Max Schnur (Australia) John-Patrick Smith	2–6, 7–6^{(11–9)}, [10–8]
2020–2021	Not held		
2019	(Barbados) Darian King (Canada) Peter Polansky	(United States) Hunter Reese (Canada) Adil Shamasdin	7–6^{(10–8)}, 6–3
2018	(Switzerland) Marc-Andrea Hüsler (Netherlands) Sem Verbeek	(Spain) Gerard Granollers (Spain) Marcel Granollers	6–7^{(5–7)}, 6–3, [14–12]
2017	(United Kingdom) Luke Bambridge (Republic of Ireland) David O'Hare	(Japan) Yusuke Takahashi (Japan) Renta Tokuda	6–2, 6–2
2016	(United States) Mitchell Krueger (United States) Daniel Nguyen	(Australia) Jarryd Chaplin (Australia) Benjamin Mitchell	6–2, 7–5

=== Women's doubles ===
Year	Champions	Runners-up	Score
2018	(Japan) Akiko Omae (Mexico) Victoria Rodríguez	(Israel) Julia Glushko (United States) Sanaz Marand	7–6^{(7–2)}, 6–3
2017	(Japan) Hiroko Kuwata (Russia) Valeria Savinykh	(Australia) Kimberly Birrell (United States) Caroline Dolehide	6–4, 7–6^{(7–4)}
2016	(United States) Francesca Di Lorenzo (United States) Ronit Yurovsky	(Canada) Marie-Alexandre Leduc (Canada) Charlotte Robillard-Millette	1–6, 7–5, [10–6]
2015	(Canada) Sharon Fichman (Serbia) Jovana Jakšić	(United States) Kristie Ahn (United States) Lorraine Guillermo	6–2, 6–1
2014	(Canada) Rosie Johanson (Canada) Charlotte Petrick	(Brazil) Maria Fernanda Alves (United States) Anamika Bhargava	6–3, 6–3
2013	(Canada) Heidi El Tabakh (United States) Allie Kiick	(United Kingdom) Samantha Murray (United Kingdom) Jade Windley	6–4, 2–6, [10–8]
