= 2021 Cleveland Open – Doubles =

Doubles
- 2021 Cleveland Open

Final
- Champions: (United States) Robert Galloway (United States) Alex Lawson
- Runners-up: (United States) Evan King (United States) Hunter Reese
- Score: 7–5, 6–7^{(5–7)}, [11–9]

Events
Singles	Doubles
← 2020 ·	Cleveland Open	· 2022 →

Treat Huey and Nathaniel Lammons were the defending champions but only Huey chose to defend his title, partnering Sem Verbeek. Huey lost in the quarterfinals to Emilio Gómez and Roberto Quiroz.

Robert Galloway and Alex Lawson won the title after defeating Evan King and Hunter Reese 7–5, 6–7^{(5–7)}, [11–9] in the final.

== Seeds ==
1. (Philippines) Treat Huey / (Netherlands) Sem Verbeek (quarterfinals)
2. (United States) Robert Galloway / (United States) Alex Lawson (champions)
3. (United States) Evan King / (United States) Hunter Reese (final)
4. (United States) Dennis Novikov / (Croatia) Ante Pavić (first round)

== Draw ==
Key

- Q = Qualifier
- WC = Wild card
- LL = Lucky loser
- Alt = Alternate
- ITF = ITF entry
- PR = Protected ranking
- SR = Special ranking
- SE = Special exempt
- JE = Junior exempt
- JR = Junior Accelerator Programme entrant
- CO = College Accelerator Programme entrant
- NG = Next Gen Accelerator Program entrant
- w/o = Walkover
- r = Retired
- d = Defaulted

First round
1	(Philippines) T Huey (Netherlands) S Verbeek	5	6	[12]
(United States) JC Aragone (Dominican Republic) R Cid Subervi	7	1	[10]
(United States) T-S Kwiatkowski (United States) A Ritschard	5	6	[11]
(Ecuador) E Gómez (Ecuador) R Quiroz	7	2	[13]
3	(United States) E King (United States) H Reese	4	6	[10]
(Colombia) A Gómez (United States) JA Ore	6	3	[8]
(United States) M Krueger (United States) Ma Redlicki	4	6	[10]
(Barbados) D King (United States) Mi Redlicki	6	2	[5]
(Colombia) N Barrientos (Philippines) R Gonzales	6	6
WC	(United States) Matthew Chen (United States) Jonathan Powell	2	4
(United States) H Johnson (United States) Y Johnson	6	6
4	(United States) D Novikov (Croatia) A Pavić	3	2
WC	(United States) Felix Corwin (United Kingdom) James Hopper	w/o
WC	(United States) Z Svajda (Denmark) M Torpegaard
(United States) N Chappell (Greece) M Pervolarakis	3	1
2	(United States) R Galloway (United States) A Lawson	6	6

Quarterfinals
1	(Philippines) T Huey (Netherlands) S Verbeek	5	6	[7]
(Ecuador) E Gómez (Ecuador) R Quiroz	7	2	[10]
3	(United States) E King (United States) H Reese	6	7^{10}
(United States) M Krueger (United States) Ma Redlicki	0	6^{8}
(Colombia) N Barrientos (Philippines) R Gonzales	6	6
(United States) H Johnson (United States) Y Johnson	4	3
WC	(United States) F Corwin (United Kingdom) J Hopper	7	4	[5]
2	(United States) R Galloway (United States) A Lawson	5	6	[10]

Semifinals
(Ecuador) E Gómez (Ecuador) R Quiroz	1	6^{3}
3	(United States) E King (United States) H Reese	6	7^{7}
(Colombia) N Barrientos (Philippines) R Gonzales	5	4
2	(United States) R Galloway (United States) A Lawson	7	6

Final
3	(United States) E King (United States) H Reese	5	7^{7}	[9]
2	(United States) R Galloway (United States) A Lawson	7	6^{5}	[11]
