= 2024 Cleveland Open – Doubles =

Doubles
- 2024 Cleveland Open

Final
- Champions: (United States) George Goldhoff (Japan) James Trotter
- Runners-up: (United States) William Blumberg (United States) Alex Lawson
- Score: 6–7^{(0–7)}, 6–3, [10–8]

Events
| Singles | Doubles |
| ← 2023 · | Cleveland Open | · 2025 → |

Robert Galloway and Hans Hach Verdugo were the defending champions but chose not to compete.

George Goldhoff and James Trotter won the title after defeating William Blumberg and Alex Lawson 6–7^{(0–7)}, 6–3, [10–8] in the final.

== Seeds ==
1. (United States) William Blumberg / (United States) Alex Lawson (final)
2. (United States) Ryan Seggerman / (United States) Patrik Trhac (first round)
3. (United Kingdom) Scott Duncan / (United States) Hunter Reese (quarterfinals)
4. (United States) Mac Kiger / (United States) Mitchell Krueger (quarterfinals, withdrew)

== Draw ==
Key

- Q = Qualifier
- WC = Wild card
- LL = Lucky loser
- Alt = Alternate
- ITF = ITF entry
- PR = Protected ranking
- SR = Special ranking
- SE = Special exempt
- JE = Junior exempt
- JR = Junior Accelerator Programme entrant
- CO = College Accelerator Programme entrant
- NG = Next Gen Accelerator Program entrant
- w/o = Walkover
- r = Retired
- d = Defaulted

First round
1 | (United States) W Blumberg (United States) A Lawson | 6 | 6^{6} | [10]
(United States) Jack Vance (United States) Tennyson Whiting | 3 | 7^{8} | [3]
WC | (United States) Diego Maza (United States) Michael Sutanto | 1 | 4
(Romania) GA Boitan (Greece) M Kalovelonis | 6 | 6
3 | (United Kingdom) S Duncan (United States) H Reese | 6 | 6^{2} | [11]
(United States) N Chappell (Australia) T Fancutt | 3 | 7^{7} | [9]
(United States) T Hilderbrand (United States) N Schachter | 2 | 6^{1}
(United States) D Kudla (United States) T-S Kwiatkowski | 6 | 7^{7}
(United States) G Goldhoff (Japan) J Trotter | 6 | 6^{4} | [10]
Alt | (United States) Henry Barrett (United States) B Battistone | 3 | 7^{7} | [6]
(United States) Ezekiel Clark (Canada) B Sigouin | 6^{3} | 6 | [3]
4 | (United States) M Kiger (United States) M Krueger | 7^{7} | 1 | [10]
(Venezuela) LD Martínez (United States) E Quinn | 7^{7} | 3 | [8]
(Germany) S Fanselow (Germany) Lucas Gerch | 6^{5} | 6 | [10]
(United States) Felix Corwin (United States) J Sheehy | 2 | 6 | [10]
2 | (United States) R Seggerman (United States) P Trhac | 6 | 3 | [8]

Quarterfinals
1 | (United States) W Blumberg (United States) A Lawson | 6 | 6
(Romania) GA Boitan (Greece) M Kalovelonis | 1 | 3
3 | (United Kingdom) S Duncan (United States) H Reese | 5 | 4
(United States) D Kudla (United States) T-S Kwiatkowski | 7 | 6
(United States) G Goldhoff (Japan) J Trotter | w/o
4 | (United States) M Kiger (United States) M Krueger
(Germany) S Fanselow (Germany) L Gerch
(United States) F Corwin (United States) J Sheehy | w/o

Semifinals
1 | (United States) W Blumberg (United States) A Lawson | w/o
(United States) D Kudla (United States) T-S Kwiatkowski
(United States) G Goldhoff (Japan) J Trotter | 6 | 7
(United States) F Corwin (United States) J Sheehy | 1 | 5

Final
1 | (United States) W Blumberg (United States) A Lawson | 7^{7} | 3 | [8]
(United States) G Goldhoff (Japan) J Trotter | 6^{0} | 6 | [10]
