= 2021 Cleveland Open – Singles =

Singles
- 2021 Cleveland Open

Final
- Champion: (United States) Bjorn Fratangelo
- Runner-up: (United States) Jenson Brooksby
- Score: 7–5, 6–4

Events
Singles	Doubles
← 2020 ·	Cleveland Open	· 2022 →

Mikael Torpegaard was the defending champion but lost in the first round to Lucas Catarina.

Bjorn Fratangelo won the title after defeating Jenson Brooksby 7–5, 6–4 in the final.

== Seeds ==
1. (Australia) James Duckworth (first round)
2. (Japan) Go Soeda (first round)
3. (Ecuador) Emilio Gómez (semifinals)
4. (Denmark) Mikael Torpegaard (first round)
5. (United States) Mitchell Krueger (first round)
6. (Canada) Brayden Schnur (second round)
7. (United States) Thai-Son Kwiatkowski (first round)
8. (Dominican Republic) Roberto Cid Subervi (first round)

== Draw ==
Key

- Q = Qualifier
- WC = Wild card
- LL = Lucky loser
- Alt = Alternate
- ITF = ITF entry
- PR = Protected ranking
- SR = Special ranking
- SE = Special exempt
- JE = Junior exempt
- JR = Junior Accelerator Programme entrant
- CO = College Accelerator Programme entrant
- NG = Next Gen Accelerator Program entrant
- w/o = Walkover
- r = Retired
- d = Defaulted

=== Finals ===
Semifinals
(United States) Jenson Brooksby	2	7	6
3	(Ecuador) Emilio Gómez	6	5	4
Q	(United States) Aleksandar Kovacevic	3	6	1
(United States) Bjorn Fratangelo	6	2	6

Final
(United States) Jenson Brooksby	5	4
(United States) Bjorn Fratangelo	7	6

=== Top half ===
First round
1	(Australia) J Duckworth	6^{11}	1
(United States) Mi Redlicki	7^{13}	6
WC	(Canada) L Draxl	7^{8}	6
(Ecuador) R Quiroz	6^{6}	4
(United States) J Brooksby	7^{7}	7^{7}
WC	(United States) Z Svajda	6^{4}	6^{5}
Q	(United States) Felix Corwin	6^{0}	6^{4}
6	(Canada) B Schnur	7^{7}	7^{7}
3	(Ecuador) E Gómez	6	6
Alt	(United States) E King	4	2
Alt	(Colombia) N Mejía	6	4	6
Q	(United States) Evan Song	3	6	3
(Japan) H Moriya	6	4	2
(United States) C Eubanks	4	6	6
(Barbados) D King	6	5	7
5	(United States) M Krueger	3	7	5

Second round
(United States) Mi Redlicki	6	6
WC	(Canada) L Draxl	3	3
(United States) J Brooksby	6	7^{7}
6	(Canada) B Schnur	2	6^{5}
3	(Ecuador) E Gómez	1	7^{7}	6
Alt	(Colombia) N Mejía	6	6^{4}	1
(United States) C Eubanks	6	6
(Barbados) D King	1	2

Quarterfinals
(United States) Mi Redlicki	6^{5}	4
(United States) J Brooksby	7^{7}	6
3	(Ecuador) E Gómez	6	6
(United States) C Eubanks	3	3

Semifinals
(United States) J Brooksby	2	7	6
3	(Ecuador) E Gómez	6	5	4

=== Bottom half ===
First round
8	(Dominican Republic) R Cid Subervi	2	4
Q	(United States) A Kovacevic	6	6
(United States) N Chappell	4	7	4
WC	(United States) Roy Smith	6	5	6
(United States) K King	4	6^{1}
(Japan) Yo Watanuki	6	7^{7}
Alt	(Monaco) L Catarina	5	6	6
4	(Denmark) M Torpegaard	7	3	4
7	(United States) T-S Kwiatkowski	4	2
(United States) B Fratangelo	6	6
(United States) A Ritschard	7^{7}	5	7
(United States) JC Aragone	6^{5}	7	5
Q	(Canada) A Galarneau	6	6
(Japan) Shuichi Sekiguchi	3	1
(United States) D Young	6	6^{5}	7
2	(Japan) G Soeda	3	7^{7}	5

Second round
Q	(United States) A Kovacevic	7^{7}	6
WC	(United States) R Smith	6^{4}	3
(Japan) Yo Watanuki	6	5	6
Alt	(Monaco) L Catarina	3	7	1
(United States) B Fratangelo	6	6
(United States) A Ritschard	3	2
Q	(Canada) A Galarneau	7	7
(United States) D Young	5	5

Quarterfinals
Q	(United States) A Kovacevic	5	6	6
(Japan) Yo Watanuki	7	2	3
(United States) B Fratangelo	6	5
Q	(Canada) A Galarneau	3	0^{r}

Semifinals
Q	(United States) A Kovacevic	3	6	1
(United States) B Fratangelo	6	2	6
