= 2022 Cleveland Open – Doubles =

Doubles
- 2022 Cleveland Open

Final
- Champions: (United States) William Blumberg (United States) Max Schnur
- Runners-up: (United States) Robert Galloway (United States) Jackson Withrow
- Score: 6–3, 7–6^{(7–4)}

Events
Singles	Doubles
← 2021 ·	Cleveland Open	· 2023 →

Robert Galloway and Alex Lawson were the reigning champions but chose to defend their title with different partners. Galloway partnered Jackson Withrow but lost in the final to William Blumberg and Max Schnur. Lawson partnered Reese Stalder but lost in the semifinals to Galloway and Withrow.

Blumberg and Schnur won the title after defeating Galloway and Withrow 6–3, 7–6^{(7–4)} in the final.

== Seeds ==
1. (United States) Robert Galloway / (United States) Jackson Withrow (final)
2. (United States) William Blumberg / (United States) Max Schnur (champions)
3. (Philippines) Ruben Gonzales / (Switzerland) Luca Margaroli (semifinals)
4. (United States) Alex Lawson / (United States) Reese Stalder (semifinals)

== Draw ==
Key

- Q = Qualifier
- WC = Wild card
- LL = Lucky loser
- Alt = Alternate
- ITF = ITF entry
- PR = Protected ranking
- SR = Special ranking
- SE = Special exempt
- JE = Junior exempt
- JR = Junior Accelerator Programme entrant
- CO = College Accelerator Programme entrant
- NG = Next Gen Accelerator Program entrant
- w/o = Walkover
- r = Retired
- d = Defaulted

First round
1	(United States) R Galloway (United States) J Withrow	6	6
(United States) C Harrison (Canada) P Polansky	4	0
WC	(United States) N Godsick (Switzerland) D Stricker	5	7	[10]
(Japan) Y Uchiyama (Japan) Yo Watanuki	7	5	[6]
4	(United States) A Lawson (United States) R Stalder	7^{7}	7
Alt	(Australia) R Hijikata (United States) A Rybakov	6^{3}	5
Alt	(India) A Chandrasekar (India) VS Prashanth	6	6
(Japan) Y Nishioka (Japan) K Uchida	3	0
(France) G Blancaneaux (Italy) T Fabbiano	4	7	[10]
(United States) N Chappell (Chinese Taipei) T-l Wu	6	5	[7]
(Dominican Republic) N Hardt (Colombia) N Mejía	2	4
3	(Philippines) R Gonzales (Switzerland) L Margaroli	6	6
(Moldova) A Cozbinov (Uzbekistan) D Istomin	0	7	[10]
(United States) JC Aragone (Canada) B Schnur	6	5	[8]
WC	(United Kingdom) James Hopper (United States) Jonathan Powell	4	2
2	(United States) W Blumberg (United States) M Schnur	6	6

Quarterfinals
1	(United States) R Galloway (United States) J Withrow	6	3	[10]
WC	(United States) N Godsick (Switzerland) D Stricker	1	6	[3]
4	(United States) A Lawson (United States) R Stalder	6	6
Alt	(India) A Chandrasekar (India) VS Prashanth	0	3
(France) G Blancaneaux (Italy) T Fabbiano	4	2
3	(Philippines) R Gonzales (Switzerland) L Margaroli	6	6
(Moldova) A Cozbinov (Uzbekistan) D Istomin	2	6^{4}
2	(United States) W Blumberg (United States) M Schnur	6	7^{7}

Semifinals
1	(United States) R Galloway (United States) J Withrow	6^{5}	7^{12}	[16]
4	(United States) A Lawson (United States) R Stalder	7^{7}	6^{10}	[14]
3	(Philippines) R Gonzales (Switzerland) L Margaroli	3	6	[8]
2	(United States) W Blumberg (United States) M Schnur	6	4	[10]

Final
1	(United States) R Galloway (United States) J Withrow	3	6^{4}
2	(United States) W Blumberg (United States) M Schnur	6	7^{7}
