= 2026 Cleveland Open – Doubles =

Doubles
- 2026 Cleveland Open

Final
- Champions: (United States) Cannon Kingsley (Antigua and Barbuda) Jody Maginley
- Runners-up: (United States) George Goldhoff (Australia) Calum Puttergill
- Score: 6–3, 6–4

Events
Singles	Doubles
- Cleveland Open

Robert Cash and JJ Tracy were the defending champions but chose not to defend their title.

Cannon Kingsley and Jody Maginley won the title after defeating George Goldhoff and Calum Puttergill 6–3, 6–4 in the final.

== Seeds ==
1. (United States) Trey Hilderbrand / (United States) Mac Kiger (quarterfinals)
2. (United States) George Goldhoff / (Australia) Calum Puttergill (final)
3. (Venezuela) Juan José Bianchi / (United States) Daniel Milavsky (quarterfinals)
4. (United Kingdom) Scott Duncan / (United Kingdom) James MacKinlay (semifinals)

== Draw ==
Key

- Q = Qualifier
- WC = Wild card
- LL = Lucky loser
- Alt = Alternate
- ITF = ITF entry
- PR = Protected ranking
- SR = Special ranking
- SE = Special exempt
- JE = Junior exempt
- JR = Junior Accelerator Programme entrant
- CO = College Accelerator Programme entrant
- NG = Next Gen Accelerator Program entrant
- w/o = Walkover
- r = Retired
- d = Defaulted

First round
1	(United States) T Hilderbrand (United States) M Kiger	6	6
(United States) G Johns (United States) K Poling	4	4
(United States) Zachary Fuchs (United States) Wally Thayne	6^{5}	2
(United States) C Kingsley (Antigua and Barbuda) J Maginley	7^{7}	6
3	(Venezuela) Juan José Bianchi (United States) D Milavsky	6	6
(United States) Andre Ilagan (United States) Jamie Vance	3	3
(United States) S Kozlov (Venezuela) B Pérez	3	6	[10]
(United States) P Kumar (United States) N Schachter	6	2	[6]
(United Kingdom) F Bass (United Kingdom) B Jones	6^{5}	2
(United States) J Sheehy (United States) T Zink	7^{7}	6
(Argentina) Valentín Basel (Argentina) F Ribero	1	5
4	(United Kingdom) S Duncan (United Kingdom) J MacKinlay	6	7
WC	(United Kingdom) James Hopper (United States) K Smith	3	6	[8]
(Canada) J Boulais (United States) A Martin	6	3	[10]
Alt	(Canada) D Martin (United States) Tristan McCormick	3	1
2	(United States) G Goldhoff (Australia) C Puttergill	6	6

Quarterfinals
1	(United States) T Hilderbrand (United States) M Kiger	6^{3}	6^{6}
(United States) C Kingsley (Antigua and Barbuda) J Maginley	7^{7}	7^{8}
3	(Venezuela) JJ Bianchi (United States) D Milavsky	4	6	[9]
(United States) S Kozlov (Venezuela) B Pérez	6	4	[11]
(United States) J Sheehy (United States) T Zink	6	4	[8]
4	(United Kingdom) S Duncan (United Kingdom) J MacKinlay	4	6	[10]
(Canada) J Boulais (United States) A Martin	3	7	[8]
2	(United States) G Goldhoff (Australia) C Puttergill	6	5	[10]

Semifinals
(United States) C Kingsley (Antigua and Barbuda) J Maginley	6	6
(United States) S Kozlov (Venezuela) B Pérez	3	4
4	(United Kingdom) S Duncan (United Kingdom) J MacKinlay	6	4	[8]
2	(United States) G Goldhoff (Australia) C Puttergill	2	6	[10]

Final
(United States) C Kingsley (Antigua and Barbuda) J Maginley	6	6
2	(United States) G Goldhoff (Australia) C Puttergill	3	4
