= 2019 Cleveland Open – Singles =

Singles
- 2019 Cleveland Open

Final
- Champion: (United States) Maxime Cressy
- Runner-up: (Denmark) Mikael Torpegaard
- Score: 6–7^{(4–7)}, 7–6^{(8–6)}, 6–3

Events
Singles	Doubles
- Cleveland Open

This was the first edition of the tournament.

Maxime Cressy won the title after defeating Mikael Torpegaard 6–7^{(4–7)}, 7–6^{(8–6)}, 6–3 in the final.

== Seeds ==
All seeds receive a bye into the second round.

1. (Chinese Taipei) Jason Jung (second round)
2. (Serbia) Miomir Kecmanović (third round)
3. (United States) Noah Rubin (quarterfinals)
4. (Germany) Dominik Köpfer (second round)
5. (Barbados) Darian King (semifinals)
6. (United States) Tim Smyczek (third round)
7. (Ecuador) Roberto Quiroz (third round)
8. (Canada) Brayden Schnur (quarterfinals)
9. (El Salvador) Marcelo Arévalo (withdrew)
10. (Germany) Dustin Brown (third round)
11. (Brazil) Thomaz Bellucci (second round)
12. (United States) Donald Young (second round)
13. (Canada) Filip Peliwo (third round)
14. (United States) Christian Harrison (second round)
15. (United States) Marcos Giron (semifinals)
16. (Dominican Republic) Roberto Cid Subervi (second round)

== Draw ==
Key

- Q = Qualifier
- WC = Wild card
- LL = Lucky loser
- Alt = Alternate
- ITF = ITF entry
- PR = Protected ranking
- SR = Special ranking
- SE = Special exempt
- JE = Junior exempt
- JR = Junior Accelerator Programme entrant
- CO = College Accelerator Programme entrant
- NG = Next Gen Accelerator Program entrant
- w/o = Walkover
- r = Retired
- d = Defaulted

=== Finals ===
Quarterfinals
15	(United States) Marcos Giron	7^{7}	6
Q	(United States) Jared Hiltzik	6^{4}	4
(Croatia) Borna Gojo	4	2
Q	(United States) Maxime Cressy	6	6
5	(Barbados) Darian King	6	7^{10}
3/WC	(United States) Noah Rubin	4	6^{8}
8	(Canada) Brayden Schnur	5	3
(Denmark) Mikael Torpegaard	7	6

Semifinals
15	(United States) Marcos Giron	3	6	3
Q	(United States) Maxime Cressy	6	3	6
5	(Barbados) Darian King	4	6	3
(Denmark) Mikael Torpegaard	6	3	6

Final
Q	(United States) Maxime Cressy	6^{4}	7^{8}	6
(Denmark) Mikael Torpegaard	7^{7}	6^{6}	3

=== Top half ===
==== Section 1 ====
First round
WC	(United States) J. J. Wolf	6	6
WC	(United States) R Shane	1	2
(Portugal) G Oliveira	6	5	6
(United States) E King	2	7	3
ITF	(Argentina) MF Descotte	6	5	5
Q	(United States) Jared Hiltzik	4	7	7
WC	(United States) Felix Corwin	1	3
(United States) K King	6	6

Second round
1	(Chinese Taipei) J Jung	3	4
WC	(United States) J. J. Wolf	6	6
(Portugal) G Oliveira	6	1	2
15	(United States) M Giron	4	6	6
11	(Brazil) T Bellucci	6	4	1
Q	(United States) J Hiltzik	4	6	6
(United States) K King	1	6	3
7	(Ecuador) R Quiroz	6	4	6

Third round
WC	(United States) J. J. Wolf	4	7^{7}	5
15	(United States) M Giron	6	6^{3}	7
Q	(United States) J Hiltzik	6	6
7	(Ecuador) R Quiroz	4	2

Quarterfinals
15	(United States) M Giron	7^{7}	6
Q	(United States) J Hiltzik	6^{4}	4

==== Section 2 ====
First round
WC	(United States) Mi Redlicki	3	7^{7}	4
(Croatia) B Gojo	6	6^{5}	6
(Spain) M Vilella Martínez	6	6
(Russia) E Karlovskiy	4	3
Q	(United States) M Cressy	4	6	7
(Japan) K Uchida	6	3	5
(United Kingdom) L Broady	6	7^{7}
(Dominican Republic) V Estrella Burgos	3	6^{1}

Second round
4	(Germany) D Köpfer	1	7	4
(Croatia) B Gojo	6	5	6
(Spain) M Vilella Martínez	2	4
13	(Canada) F Peliwo	6	6
LL	(Ecuador) G Escobar	3	3
Q	(United States) M Cressy	6	6
(United Kingdom) L Broady	4	3
6	(United States) T Smyczek	6	6

Third round
(Croatia) B Gojo	6	6
13	(Canada) F Peliwo	1	3
Q	(United States) M Cressy	6	6
6	(United States) T Smyczek	4	3

Quarterfinals
(Croatia) B Gojo	4	2
Q	(United States) M Cressy	6	6

=== Bottom half ===
==== Section 3 ====
First round
(Serbia) D Petrović	7^{7}	4	7^{7}
(Croatia) A Pavić	6^{3}	6	6^{4}
(United States) Roy Smith	7^{8}	6
ITF	(Netherlands) G Brouwer	6^{6}	3
(United States) U Blanch	7^{7}	7
(United States) Evan Song	6^{3}	5
(United States) A Sarkissian	2	3
(France) B Bonzi	6	6

Second round
5	(Barbados) D King	6	6
(Serbia) D Petrović	3	4
(United States) R Smith	6	0	7^{7}
12	(United States) D Young	4	6	6^{5}
16	(Dominican Republic) R Cid Subervi	4	7	6^{4}
(United States) U Blanch	6	5	7^{7}
(France) B Bonzi	4	4
3/WC	(United States) N Rubin	6	6

Third round
5	(Barbados) D King	6	3
(United States) R Smith	4	0^{r}
(United States) U Blanch	3	6	2^{r}
3/WC	(United States) N Rubin	6	3	4

Quarterfinals
5	(Barbados) D King	6	7^{10}
3/WC	(United States) N Rubin	4	6^{8}

==== Section 4 ====
First round
ITF	(Germany) L Wessels	4	7	5
(United States) S Kozlov	6	5	7
ITF	(France) Tom Jomby	2	1^{r}
(United Kingdom) J Choinski	6	2
(France) V Millot	3	3
(Denmark) M Torpegaard	6	6
(Italy) R Marcora	6	4	7
(United States) D Novikov	3	6	5

Second round
8	(Canada) B Schnur	7^{7}	6
(United States) S Kozlov	6^{5}	4
(United Kingdom) J Choinski	6^{5}	6	6^{1}
10	(Germany) D Brown	7^{7}	1	7^{7}
14	(United States) C Harrison	0	3
(Denmark) M Torpegaard	6	6
(Italy) R Marcora	5	2
2	(Serbia) M Kecmanović	7	6

Third round
8	(Canada) B Schnur	7	6
10	(Germany) D Brown	5	4
(Denmark) M Torpegaard	7^{7}	4	7^{9}
2	(Serbia) M Kecmanović	6^{1}	6	6^{7}

Quarterfinals
8	(Canada) B Schnur	5	3
(Denmark) M Torpegaard	7	6
