= 2022 Cleveland Open – Singles =

Singles
- 2022 Cleveland Open

Final
- Champion: (Switzerland) Dominic Stricker
- Runner-up: (Japan) Yoshihito Nishioka
- Score: 7–5, 6–1

Events
| Singles | Doubles |
| ← 2021 · | Cleveland Open | · 2023 → |

Bjorn Fratangelo was the defending champion but lost in the first round to Nicola Kuhn.

Dominic Stricker won the title after defeating Yoshihito Nishioka 7–5, 6–1 in the final.

== Seeds ==
1. (United States) Tennys Sandgren (second round)
2. (Italy) Andreas Seppi (first round)
3. (Japan) Yoshihito Nishioka (final)
4. (United Kingdom) Liam Broady (second round)
5. (Austria) Jurij Rodionov (second round)
6. (United States) Ernesto Escobedo (quarterfinals)
7. (Ecuador) Emilio Gómez (second round, retired)
8. (United States) Jack Sock (second round, retired)

== Draw ==
Key

- Q = Qualifier
- WC = Wild card
- LL = Lucky loser
- Alt = Alternate
- ITF = ITF entry
- PR = Protected ranking
- SR = Special ranking
- SE = Special exempt
- JE = Junior exempt
- JR = Junior Accelerator Programme entrant
- CO = College Accelerator Programme entrant
- NG = Next Gen Accelerator Program entrant
- w/o = Walkover
- r = Retired
- d = Defaulted

=== Finals ===
Semifinals
(Italy) Thomas Fabbiano | 6^{6} | 3
3 | (Japan) Yoshihito Nishioka | 7^{8} | 6
(United States) Michael Mmoh | 6 | 3 | 6^{2}
(Switzerland) Dominic Stricker | 3 | 6 | 7^{7}

Final
3 | (Japan) Yoshihito Nishioka | 5 | 1
(Switzerland) Dominic Stricker | 7 | 6

=== Top half ===
First round
1 | (United States) T Sandgren | 7^{7} | 3 | 7^{7}
(United States) C Harrison | 6^{5} | 6 | 6^{3}
(Italy) T Fabbiano | 7 | 6
(United States) M Krueger | 5 | 3
(Germany) C-M Stebe | 4 | 6 | 6
(Denmark) M Torpegaard | 6 | 4 | 2
Q | (Australia) R Hijikata | 6^{4} | 3
5 | (Austria) J Rodionov | 7^{7} | 6
3 | (Japan) Y Nishioka | 6 | 6
(Uzbekistan) D Istomin | 1 | 1
(Japan) Y Uchiyama | 6 | 6
Q | (Germany) S Fanselow | 4 | 3
Q | (Ecuador) R Quiroz | 4 | 7^{9} | 4
WC | (United States) W Blumberg | 6 | 6^{7} | 6
(Chinese Taipei) J Jung | 3 | 4
7 | (Ecuador) E Gómez | 6 | 6

Second round
1 | (United States) T Sandgren | 6 | 4 | 1
(Italy) T Fabbiano | 3 | 6 | 6
(Germany) C-M Stebe | 7 | 3 | 6
5 | (Austria) J Rodionov | 5 | 6 | 1
3 | (Japan) Y Nishioka | 6 | 1 | 6
(Japan) Y Uchiyama | 4 | 6 | 4
WC | (United States) W Blumberg | 6 | 3
7 | (Ecuador) E Gómez | 1 | 1^{r}

Quarterfinals
(Italy) T Fabbiano | 6 | 6
(Germany) C-M Stebe | 1 | 3
3 | (Japan) Y Nishioka | 3 | 6 | 6
WC | (United States) W Blumberg | 6 | 4 | 2

Semifinals
(Italy) T Fabbiano | 6^{6} | 3
3 | (Japan) Y Nishioka | 7^{8} | 6

=== Bottom half ===
First round
8 | (United States) J Sock | 2 | 6 | 6
(Canada) B Schnur | 6 | 4 | 3
(United States) M Mmoh | 6 | 6
WC | (United States) A Kovacevic | 4 | 2
Q | (Canada) A Galarneau | 7^{7} | 7^{7}
Q | (United States) U Blanch | 6^{5} | 6^{3}
(United States) J. J. Wolf | 4 | 1
4 | (United Kingdom) L Broady | 6 | 6
6 | (United States) E Escobedo | 7^{7} | 6
WC | (United States) K Smith | 6^{3} | 4
(Germany) N Kuhn | 7^{10} | 6
(United States) B Fratangelo | 6^{8} | 4
(France) G Blancaneaux | 4 | 7^{7} | 6^{5}
Q | (United States) Em Nava | 6 | 6^{5} | 7^{7}
(Switzerland) D Stricker | 6 | 6
2 | (Italy) A Seppi | 4 | 4

Second round
8 | (United States) J Sock | 1 | 1^{r}
(United States) M Mmoh | 6 | 2
Q | (Canada) A Galarneau | 6 | 7
4 | (United Kingdom) L Broady | 1 | 5
6 | (United States) E Escobedo | 6^{6} | 7 | 4
(Germany) N Kuhn | 7^{8} | 5 | 0^{r}
Q | (United States) Em Nava | 6 | 3 | 4
(Switzerland) D Stricker | 3 | 6 | 6

Quarterfinals
(United States) M Mmoh | 6^{3} | 6 | 6
Q | (Canada) A Galarneau | 7^{7} | 3 | 0
6 | (United States) E Escobedo | 3 | 6^{4}
(Switzerland) D Stricker | 6 | 7^{7}

Semifinals
(United States) M Mmoh | 6 | 3 | 6^{2}
(Switzerland) D Stricker | 3 | 6 | 7^{7}
