= 2021 Cleveland Open =

- Date: 15–21 March
- Edition: 3rd
- Surface: Hard (Indoor)
- Location: Cleveland, Ohio, United States

Champions

Singles
- (United States) Bjorn Fratangelo

Doubles
- (United States) Robert Galloway / (United States) Alex Lawson
← 2020 ·	Cleveland Open	· 2022 →

The 2021 Cleveland Open was a professional tennis tournament played on hard courts. It was the third edition of the tournament which was part of the 2021 ATP Challenger Tour. It took place in Cleveland, Ohio, United States between March 15 and March 21, 2021.

== Singles main-draw entrants ==
=== Seeds ===
Country	Player1	Rank^{1}	Seed
AUS	James Duckworth	103	1
JPN	Go Soeda	144	2
ECU	Emilio Gómez	176	3
DEN	Mikael Torpegaard	190	4
USA	Mitchell Krueger	205	5
CAN	Brayden Schnur	216	6
USA	Thai-Son Kwiatkowski	218	7
DOM	Roberto Cid Subervi	231	8

- ^{1} Rankings are as of 8 March 2021.

=== Other entrants ===
The following players received wildcards into the singles main draw:

- (Canada) Liam Draxl
- (United States) Roy Smith
- (United States) Zachary Svajda

The following players received entry into the singles main draw as alternates:

- (Monaco) Lucas Catarina
- (United States) Evan King
- (Colombia) Nicolás Mejía

The following players received entry from the qualifying draw:

- (United States) Felix Corwin
- (Canada) Alexis Galarneau
- (United States) Aleksandar Kovacevic
- (United States) Evan Song

== Champions ==
=== Singles ===
- (United States) Bjorn Fratangelo def. (United States) Jenson Brooksby 7–5, 6–4.

=== Doubles ===
- (United States) Robert Galloway / (United States) Alex Lawson def. (United States) Evan King / (United States) Hunter Reese 7–5, 6–7^{(5–7)}, [11–9].
