= 2023 Cleveland Open – Singles =

Singles
- 2023 Cleveland Open

Final
- Champion: (United States) Aleksandar Kovacevic
- Runner-up: (China) Wu Yibing
- Score: 3–6, 7–5, 7–6^{(7–2)}

Events
Singles	Doubles
← 2022 ·	Cleveland Open	· 2024 →

Dominic Stricker was the defending champion but chose not to defend his title.

Aleksandar Kovacevic won the title after defeating Wu Yibing 3–6, 7–5, 7–6^{(7–2)} in the final.

== Seeds ==
1. (Ecuador) Emilio Gómez (semifinals)
2. (China) Wu Yibing (final)
3. (United States) Steve Johnson (quarterfinals)
4. (United States) Jack Sock (first round)
5. (United States) Aleksandar Kovacevic (champion)
6. (United States) Stefan Kozlov (quarterfinals)
7. (United States) Brandon Holt (second round)
8. (Canada) Gabriel Diallo (quarterfinals)

== Draw ==
Key

- Q = Qualifier
- WC = Wild card
- LL = Lucky loser
- Alt = Alternate
- ITF = ITF entry
- PR = Protected ranking
- SR = Special ranking
- SE = Special exempt
- JE = Junior exempt
- JR = Junior Accelerator Programme entrant
- CO = College Accelerator Programme entrant
- NG = Next Gen Accelerator Program entrant
- w/o = Walkover
- r = Retired
- d = Defaulted

=== Finals ===
Semifinals
1	(Ecuador) Emilio Gómez	7^{7}	4	3
5	(United States) Aleksandar Kovacevic	6^{5}	6	6
(United States) Tennys Sandgren	3	2
2	(China) Wu Yibing	6	6

Final
5	(United States) Aleksandar Kovacevic	3	7	7^{7}
2	(China) Wu Yibing	6	5	6^{2}

=== Top half ===
First round
1	(Ecuador) E Gómez	7	6
(United States) Ezekiel Clark	5	2
WC	(United Kingdom) J Pinnington Jones	6	3
(Mexico) E Escobedo	2	1^{r}
(United States) N Chappell	3	6^{4}
(United States) M Krueger	6	7^{7}
(United States) A Ayeni	1	1
8	(Canada) G Diallo	6	6
3	(United States) S Johnson	6	7^{7}
(Czech Republic) J Forejtek	4	6^{2}
(United States) K Smith	6	4	4
(United States) Kyle Seelig	2	6	6
Q	(United States) TA Kodat	5	7	3
(Ukraine) I Marchenko	7	5	6
(United States) A Rybakov	6^{7}	7^{9}	2
5	(United States) A Kovacevic	7^{9}	6^{7}	6

Second round
1	(Ecuador) E Gómez	6	3	6
WC	(United Kingdom) J Pinnington Jones	2	6	2
(United States) M Krueger	7^{8}	1	1
8	(Canada) G Diallo	6^{6}	6	6
3	(United States) S Johnson	7^{11}	6
(United States) K Seelig	6^{9}	2
(Ukraine) I Marchenko	5	3
5	(United States) A Kovacevic	7	6

Quarterfinals
1	(Ecuador) E Gómez	7^{7}	4	7
8	(Canada) G Diallo	6^{5}	6	5
3	(United States) S Johnson	7^{7}	5	4
5	(United States) A Kovacevic	6^{5}	7	6

Semifinals
1	(Ecuador) E Gómez	7^{7}	4	3
5	(United States) A Kovacevic	6^{5}	6	6

=== Bottom half ===
First round
7	(United States) B Holt	6	6
Q	(United States) A Perez	4	2
(Germany) Elmar Ejupovic	2	7^{7}	6^{4}
(United States) T Sandgren	6	6^{4}	7^{7}
Q	(Croatia) M Pecotić	1	2
(United States) Z Svajda	6	6
WC	(United States) A Michelsen	7^{7}	6
4	(United States) J Sock	6^{3}	4
6/WC	(United States) S Kozlov	6	7^{10}
Alt	(United States) P Kypson	4	6^{8}
Q	(United States) R Harrison	6	6
Q	(France) Jaimee Floyd Angele	2	1
(United States) E Zhu	2	5
(United States) S Kirchheimer	6	7
Q	(United States) A Mayo	1	6	4
2	(China) Y Wu	6	0	6

Second round
7	(United States) B Holt	3	6	2
(United States) T Sandgren	6	4	6
(United States) Z Svajda	7	6
WC	(United States) A Michelsen	5	3
6/WC	(United States) S Kozlov	6	6
Q	(United States) R Harrison	4	4
(United States) S Kirchheimer	6^{9}	6^{1}
2	(China) Y Wu	7^{11}	7^{7}

Quarterfinals
(United States) T Sandgren	6	2	7^{7}
(United States) Z Svajda	0	6	6^{1}
6/WC	(United States) S Kozlov	4	1
2	(China) Y Wu	6	6

Semifinals
(United States) T Sandgren	3	2
2	(China) Y Wu	6	6
