= 2020 Cleveland Open – Singles =

Singles
- 2020 Cleveland Open

Final
- Champion: (Denmark) Mikael Torpegaard
- Runner-up: (Japan) Yosuke Watanuki
- Score: 6–3, 1–6, 6–1

Events
Singles	Doubles
- Cleveland Open

Maxime Cressy was the defending champion but lost in the third round to Ulises Blanch.

Mikael Torpegaard won the title after defeating Yosuke Watanuki 6–3, 1–6, 6–1 in the final.

== Seeds ==
All seeds receive a bye into the second round.

1. (United States) Denis Kudla (quarterfinals)
2. (Australia) Christopher O'Connell (second round)
3. (Austria) Sebastian Ofner (second round)
4. (Kazakhstan) Dmitry Popko (second round)
5. (Chile) Alejandro Tabilo (third round)
6. (United States) J. J. Wolf (third round)
7. (Brazil) João Menezes (second round)
8. (United States) Michael Mmoh (third round)
9. (United States) Ernesto Escobedo (semifinals)
10. (Dominican Republic) Roberto Cid Subervi (second round)
11. (Spain) Adrián Menéndez Maceiras (second round)
12. (Denmark) Mikael Torpegaard (champion)
13. (France) Arthur Rinderknech (second round)
14. (Germany) Tobias Kamke (second round)
15. (United States) Sebastian Korda (third round)
16. (South Korea) Nam Ji-sung (second round)

== Draw ==
Key

- Q = Qualifier
- WC = Wild card
- LL = Lucky loser
- Alt = Alternate
- ITF = ITF entry
- PR = Protected ranking
- SR = Special ranking
- SE = Special exempt
- JE = Junior exempt
- JR = Junior Accelerator Programme entrant
- CO = College Accelerator Programme entrant
- NG = Next Gen Accelerator Program entrant
- w/o = Walkover
- r = Retired
- d = Defaulted

=== Finals ===
Quarterfinals
1/SE	(United States) Denis Kudla	7^{7}	6^{6}	4
9	(United States) Ernesto Escobedo	6^{4}	7^{8}	6
(Japan) Yosuke Watanuki	7	7
(United States) Ulises Blanch	5	5
(Brazil) Thomaz Bellucci	4	6	6
(France) Geoffrey Blancaneaux	6	3	4
12	(Denmark) Mikael Torpegaard	6	6
WC	(United States) Raymond Sarmiento	4	4

Semifinals
9	(United States) Ernesto Escobedo	4	4
(Japan) Yosuke Watanuki	6	6
(Brazil) Thomaz Bellucci	1	1
12	(Denmark) Mikael Torpegaard	6	6

Final
(Japan) Yosuke Watanuki	3	6	1
12	(Denmark) Mikael Torpegaard	6	1	6

=== Top half ===
==== Section 1 ====
First round
(France) M Guinard	5	1
(Ecuador) R Quiroz	7	6
(United States) D Young	6	3	6
(Spain) R Ortega Olmedo	4	6	3
(Brazil) G Clezar	6	2	7^{7}
(Australia) J-P Smith	3	6	6^{3}
Q	(United States) N Chappell	4	3
(United States) S Bangoura	6	6

Second round
1/SE	(United States) D Kudla	7	6
(Ecuador) R Quiroz	5	4
(United States) D Young	3	2
15	(United States) S Korda	6	6
9	(United States) E Escobedo	6	6
(Brazil) G Clezar	3	4
(United States) S Bangoura	4	1
5	(Chile) A Tabilo	6	6

Third round
1/SE	(United States) D Kudla	6	6
15	(United States) S Korda	1	3
9	(United States) E Escobedo	6	6
5	(Chile) A Tabilo	4	3

Quarterfinals
1/SE	(United States) D Kudla	7^{7}	6^{6}	4
9	(United States) E Escobedo	6^{4}	7^{8}	6

==== Section 2 ====
First round
(Portugal) G Oliveira	5	6^{4}
(Tunisia) S Mansouri	7	7^{7}
(Japan) Yo Watanuki	6	7
(Australia) A Vukic	3	5
(United States) U Blanch	6	6
WC	(United States) V Kirkov	2	3
(Australia) L Saville	3	4
(United States) M Cressy	6	6

Second round
4	(Kazakhstan) D Popko	3	4
(Tunisia) S Mansouri	6	6
(Japan) Yo Watanuki	7^{7}	6
13	(France) A Rinderknech	6^{5}	3
11	(Spain) A Menéndez Maceiras	5	3
(United States) U Blanch	7	6
(United States) M Cressy	6	7^{8}
7	(Brazil) J Menezes	4	6^{6}

Third round
(Tunisia) S Mansouri	4	3
(Japan) Yo Watanuki	6	6
(United States) U Blanch	7^{8}	5	7^{7}
(United States) M Cressy	6^{6}	7	6^{4}

Quarterfinals
(Japan) Yo Watanuki	7	7
(United States) U Blanch	5	5

=== Bottom half ===
==== Section 3 ====
First round
(Austria) J Rodionov	6	6
WC	(United Kingdom) James Hopper	2	1
Q	(South Africa) R Roelofse	6^{4}	3
(Brazil) T Bellucci	7^{7}	6
(France) G Blancaneaux	4	6	6
(United States) Mi Redlicki	6	3	0
(United States) R Harrison	6	7^{7}
(United States) C Altamirano	4	6^{5}

Second round
6	(United States) J. J. Wolf	4	6	7
(Austria) J Rodionov	6	3	5
(Brazil) T Bellucci	6	6
10	(Dominican Republic) R Cid Subervi	2	4
14	(Germany) T Kamke	1	6^{2}
(France) G Blancaneaux	6	7^{7}
(United States) R Harrison	6	6^{2}	6
3	(Austria) S Ofner	3	7^{7}	3

Third round
6	(United States) J. J. Wolf	3	4
(Brazil) T Bellucci	6	6
(France) G Blancaneaux	6	3	6
(United States) R Harrison	3	6	2

Quarterfinals
(Brazil) T Bellucci	4	6	6
(France) G Blancaneaux	6	3	4

==== Section 4 ====
First round
(United States) B Nakashima	6	7^{7}
Alt	(United States) Ma Redlicki	4	6^{3}
(United States) K King	6	4	2
WC	(United States) A Kovacevic	3	6	6
WC	(United States) Alexander Brown	4	2
WC	(United States) R Sarmiento	6	6
(Ecuador) D Hidalgo	4	3
(United States) JC Aragone	6	6

Second round
8	(United States) M Mmoh	7^{7}	6
(United States) B Nakashima	6^{2}	2
WC	(United States) A Kovacevic	2	3
12	(Denmark) M Torpegaard	6	6
16	(South Korea) J-s Nam	3	2
WC	(United States) R Sarmiento	6	6
(United States) JC Aragone	7^{7}	6
2	(Australia) C O'Connell	6^{5}	2

Third round
8	(United States) M Mmoh	6^{3}	6	6^{0}
12	(Denmark) M Torpegaard	7^{7}	4	7^{7}
WC	(United States) R Sarmiento	6	7
(United States) JC Aragone	4	5

Quarterfinals
12	(Denmark) M Torpegaard	6	6
WC	(United States) R Sarmiento	4	4
