= 2024 Cleveland Open =

- Date: January 29 – February 4
- Edition: 6th
- Surface: Hard (indoor)
- Location: Cleveland, Ohio, United States

Champions

Singles
- (United States) Patrick Kypson

Doubles
- (United States) George Goldhoff / (Japan) James Trotter
← 2023 ·	Cleveland Open	· 2025 →

The 2024 Cleveland Open was a professional tennis tournament played on indoor hard courts. It was the sixth edition of the tournament which was part of the 2024 ATP Challenger Tour. It took place in Cleveland, Ohio, United States between January 29 and February 4, 2024.

== Singles main-draw entrants ==
=== Seeds ===
Country	Player	Rank^{1}	Seed
AUS	James Duckworth	95	1
USA	Zachary Svajda	143	2
USA	Emilio Nava	146	3
USA	Denis Kudla	164	4
USA	Patrick Kypson	183	5
USA	Tennys Sandgren	266	6
USA	Mitchell Krueger	286	7
USA	Aidan Mayo	298	8

- ^{1} Rankings are as of January 15, 2024.

=== Other entrants ===
The following players received wildcards into the singles main draw:

- (United States) Murphy Cassone
- (United States) Keegan Smith
- (United States) Quinn Vandecasteele

The following players received entry into the singles main draw as alternates:

- (Dominican Republic) Roberto Cid Subervi
- (Australia) Thomas Fancutt
- (United States) Noah Rubin

The following players received entry from the qualifying draw:

- (Romania) Gabi Adrian Boitan
- (United Kingdom) Patrick Brady
- (United States) William Grant
- (United States) Stefan Kozlov
- (United States) Patrick Maloney
- (Croatia) Matija Pecotić

The following player received entry as a lucky loser:

- (United States) Ezekiel Clark

== Champions ==
=== Singles ===
- (United States) Patrick Kypson def. (United States) Ethan Quinn 4–6, 6–3, 6–2.

=== Doubles ===
- (United States) George Goldhoff / (Japan) James Trotter def. (United States) William Blumberg / (United States) Alex Lawson 6–7^{(0–7)}, 6–3, [10–8].
