= 2020 Cleveland Open =

- Date: 10–16 February
- Edition: 2nd
- Draw: 48S / 4Q / 16D
- Surface: Hard
- Location: Cleveland, Ohio, United States

Champions

Singles
- (Denmark) Mikael Torpegaard

Doubles
- (Philippines) Treat Huey / (United States) Nathaniel Lammons
← 2019 ·	Cleveland Open	· 2021 →

The 2020 Cleveland Open was a professional tennis tournament played on hard courts. It was the second edition of the tournament which was part of the 2020 ATP Challenger Tour. It took place in Cleveland, Ohio, United States between February 10 and February 16, 2020.

== Singles main-draw entrants ==
=== Seeds ===
Country	Player	Rank^{1}	Seed
USA	Denis Kudla	113	1
AUS	Christopher O'Connell	114	2
AUT	Sebastian Ofner	160	3
KAZ	Dmitry Popko	170	4
CHI	Alejandro Tabilo	172	5
USA	J. J. Wolf	183	6
BRA	João Menezes	188	7
USA	Michael Mmoh	197	8
USA	Ernesto Escobedo	210	9
DOM	Roberto Cid Subervi	216	10
ESP	Adrián Menéndez Maceiras	233	11
DEN	Mikael Torpegaard	235	12
FRA	Arthur Rinderknech	236	13
GER	Tobias Kamke	237	14
USA	Sebastian Korda	238	15
KOR	Nam Ji-sung	248	16

- ^{1} Rankings are as of 3 January 2020.

=== Other entrants ===
The following players received wildcards into the singles main draw:

- (United States) Alexander Brown
- (United Kingdom) James Hopper
- (United States) Vasil Kirkov
- (United States) Aleksandar Kovacevic
- (United States) Raymond Sarmiento

The following player received entry into the singles main draw as a special exempt:

- (United States) Denis Kudla

The following player received entry into the singles main draw as an alternate:

- (United States) Martin Redlicki

The following players received entry from the qualifying draw:

- (United States) Nick Chappell
- (South Africa) Ruan Roelofse

== Champions ==
=== Singles ===
- (Denmark) Mikael Torpegaard def. (Japan) Yosuke Watanuki 6–3, 1–6, 6–1.

=== Doubles ===
- (Philippines) Treat Huey / (United States) Nathaniel Lammons def. (Australia) Luke Saville / (Australia) John-Patrick Smith 7–5, 6–2.
