= 2025 Cleveland Open – Singles =

Singles
- 2025 Cleveland Open

Final
- Champion: (United States) Colton Smith
- Runner-up: (United States) Eliot Spizzirri
- Score: 6–4, 6–7^{(6–8)}, 6–3

Events
Singles	Doubles
- Cleveland Open

Patrick Kypson was the defending champion but chose not to defend his title.

Colton Smith won the title after defeating Eliot Spizzirri 6–4, 6–7^{(6–8)}, 6–3 in the final.

== Seeds ==
1. (Argentina) Federico Agustín Gómez (first round)
2. (Moldova) Radu Albot (first round)
3. (United States) Ethan Quinn (first round)
4. (Japan) James Trotter (quarterfinals)
5. (United States) Brandon Holt (second round, withdrew)
6. (United States) Eliot Spizzirri (final)
7. (Brazil) Karue Sell (quarterfinals)
8. (United States) J. J. Wolf (semifinals)

== Draw ==
Key

- Q = Qualifier
- WC = Wild card
- LL = Lucky loser
- Alt = Alternate
- ITF = ITF entry
- PR = Protected ranking
- SR = Special ranking
- SE = Special exempt
- JE = Junior exempt
- JR = Junior Accelerator Programme entrant
- CO = College Accelerator Programme entrant
- NG = Next Gen Accelerator Program entrant
- w/o = Walkover
- r = Retired
- d = Defaulted

=== Finals ===
Semifinals
(United States) Tyler Zink	4	3
6	(United States) Eliot Spizzirri	6	6
(United States) Colton Smith	7^{9}	6
8	(United States) J. J. Wolf	6^{7}	1

Final
6	(United States) Eliot Spizzirri	4	7^{8}	3
(United States) Colton Smith	6	6^{6}	6

=== Top half ===
First round
1	(Argentina) FA Gómez	6^{5}	4
(United States) M Cassone	7^{7}	6
Q	(United States) Jackson Ross	4	2
(Canada) JC Aguilar	6	6
(United States) A Mayo	3	4
(United States) T Zink	6	6
PR	(North Macedonia) K Ivanovski	1	1
5	(United States) B Holt	6	6
4	(Japan) J Trotter	6	3	7^{7}
Q	(Poland) F Pieczonka	3	6	6^{4}
Q	(United States) Nathan Ponwith	6^{5}	6	0
Q	(United States) T Hilderbrand	7^{7}	4	6
(United States) M Mmoh	6^{3}	6	6
Q	(United States) A Rybakov	7^{7}	3	2
(Mexico) E Escobedo	4	3
6	(United States) E Spizzirri	6	6

Second round
(United States) M Cassone	6	6
(Canada) JC Aguilar	1	4
(United States) T Zink	w/o
5	(United States) B Holt
4	(Japan) J Trotter	6^{3}	6	6
Q	(United States) T Hilderbrand	7^{7}	2	4
(United States) M Mmoh	4	5
6	(United States) E Spizzirri	6	7

Quarterfinals
(United States) M Cassone	7^{7}	6^{1}	5
(United States) T Zink	6^{4}	7^{7}	7
4	(Japan) J Trotter	7	3	6^{4}
6	(United States) E Spizzirri	5	6	7^{7}

Semifinals
(United States) T Zink	4	3
6	(United States) E Spizzirri	6	6

=== Bottom half ===
First round
7	(Brazil) K Sell	6	7^{7}
(United States) A Ayeni	3	6^{5}
(United Kingdom) J Pinnington Jones	1	4
(United States) C Kingsley	6	6
(United States) R Seggerman	6^{8}	5
(United States) S Dostanic	7^{10}	7
(United States) C Smith	1	6	6
3	(United States) E Quinn	6	1	4
8	(United States) JJ Wolf	6	6
WC	(United States) J Brooksby	2	4
WC	(France) A Ghibaudo	6	6
Q	(United States) Tristan McCormick	3	3
(United States) Micah Braswell	6	3	4
(United States) S Kozlov	4	6	6
WC	(United States) K Bigun	6	7^{9}
2	(Moldova) R Albot	3	6^{7}

Second round
7	(Brazil) K Sell	6	6
(United States) C Kingsley	4	4
(United States) S Dostanic	4	4
(United States) C Smith	6	6
8	(United States) JJ Wolf	7^{13}	4	6
WC	(France) A Ghibaudo	6^{11}	6	3
(United States) S Kozlov	6	6
WC	(United States) K Bigun	2	3

Quarterfinals
7	(Brazil) K Sell	6^{4}	2
(United States) C Smith	7^{7}	6
8	(United States) JJ Wolf	6	6
(United States) S Kozlov	1	3

Semifinals
(United States) C Smith	7^{9}	6
8	(United States) JJ Wolf	6^{7}	1
