= 2026 Cleveland Open =

- Date: February 2–8
- Edition: 8th
- Surface: Hard (indoor)
- Location: Cleveland, Ohio, United States

Champions

Singles
- (United States) Colton Smith

Doubles
- (United States) Cannon Kingsley / (Antigua and Barbuda) Jody Maginley
- Cleveland Open

The 2026 Cleveland Open was a professional tennis tournament played on indoor hardcourts. It was the eighth edition of the tournament which was part of the 2026 ATP Challenger Tour. It took place in Cleveland, Ohio, United States between February 2 and 8, 2026.

== Singles main-draw entrants ==
=== Seeds ===
Country	Player	Rank^{1}	Seed
JPN	Sho Shimabukuro	144	1
USA	Colton Smith	148	2
USA	Tristan Boyer	181	3
AUS	Bernard Tomic	185	4
USA	Murphy Cassone	224	5
USA	Andres Martin	273	6
USA	Stefan Kozlov	285	7
USA	Alex Rybakov	286	8

- ^{1} Rankings are as of January 19, 2026.

=== Other entrants ===
The following players received wildcards into the singles main draw:

- (United States) Lincoln Battle
- (United States) Kaylan Bigun
- (United States) Karl Poling

The following player received entry into the singles main draw through the Junior Accelerator programme:

- (United States) Jack Kennedy

The following player received entry into the singles main draw as an alternate:

- (Japan) Jay Dylan Friend

The following players received entry from the qualifying draw:

- (Canada) Justin Boulais
- (United States) Stefan Dostanic
- (United Kingdom) Ben Jones
- (United States) Matt Kuhar
- (United States) Joshua Sheehy
- (United States) Quinn Vandecasteele

== Champions ==
=== Singles ===
- (United States) Colton Smith def. (Croatia) Borna Gojo 6–4, 7–5.

=== Doubles ===
- (United States) Cannon Kingsley / (Antigua and Barbuda) Jody Maginley def. (United States) George Goldhoff / (Australia) Calum Puttergill 6–3, 6–4.
