= Redlicki =

Redlicki (feminine: Redlicka) is a Polish surname. Notable people with the surname include:

- Martin Redlicki (born 1995), American tennis player of Polish descent
- Michael Redlicki (born 1993), American tennis player of Polish descent
