= 2022 Cleveland Open =

- Date: January 31 – February 6
- Edition: 4th
- Surface: Hard (indoor)
- Location: Cleveland, Ohio, United States

Champions

Singles
- (Switzerland) Dominic Stricker

Doubles
- (United States) William Blumberg / (United States) Max Schnur
← 2021 ·	Cleveland Open	· 2023 →

The 2022 Cleveland Open was a professional tennis tournament played on indoor hard courts. It was the fourth edition of the tournament which was part of the 2022 ATP Challenger Tour. It took place in Cleveland, Ohio, United States between January 31 and February 6, 2022.

== Singles main-draw entrants ==
=== Seeds ===
Country	Player	Rank^{1}	Seed
USA	Tennys Sandgren	94	1
ITA	Andreas Seppi	101	2
JPN	Yoshihito Nishioka	119	3
GBR	Liam Broady	128	4
AUT	Jurij Rodionov	137	5
USA	Ernesto Escobedo	141	6
ECU	Emilio Gómez	153	7
USA	Jack Sock	157	8

- ^{1} Rankings are as of January 17, 2022.

=== Other entrants ===
The following players received wildcards into the singles main draw:

- (United States) William Blumberg
- (United States) Aleksandar Kovacevic
- (United States) Keegan Smith

The following players received entry from the qualifying draw:

- (United States) Ulises Blanch
- (Germany) Sebastian Fanselow
- (Canada) Alexis Galarneau
- (Australia) Rinky Hijikata
- (United States) Emilio Nava
- (Ecuador) Roberto Quiroz

== Champions ==
=== Singles ===
- (Switzerland) Dominic Stricker def. (Japan) Yoshihito Nishioka 7–5, 6–1.

=== Doubles ===
- (United States) William Blumberg / (United States) Max Schnur def. (United States) Robert Galloway / (United States) Jackson Withrow 6–3, 7–6^{(7–4)}.
