= 2023 Cleveland Open =

- Date: January 30 – February 5
- Edition: 5th
- Surface: Hard (indoor)
- Location: Cleveland, Ohio, United States

Champions

Singles
- (United States) Aleksandar Kovacevic

Doubles
- (United States) Robert Galloway / (Mexico) Hans Hach Verdugo
← 2022 ·	Cleveland Open	· 2024 →

The 2023 Cleveland Open was a professional tennis tournament played on indoor hard courts. It was the fifth edition of the tournament which was part of the 2023 ATP Challenger Tour. It took place in Cleveland, Ohio, United States between January 30 and February 5, 2023.

== Singles main-draw entrants ==
=== Seeds ===
Country	Player	Rank^{1}	Seed
ECU	Emilio Gómez	101	1
CHN	Wu Yibing	114	2
USA	Steve Johnson	119	3
USA	Jack Sock	129	4
USA	Aleksandar Kovacevic	163	5
USA	Stefan Kozlov	199	6
USA	Brandon Holt	215	7
CAN	Gabriel Diallo	223	8

- ^{1} Rankings are as of January 16, 2023.

=== Other entrants ===
The following players received wildcards into the singles main draw:

- (United States) Stefan Kozlov
- (United States) Alex Michelsen
- (United Kingdom) Jack Pinnington Jones

The following player received entry into the singles main draw as an alternate:

- (United States) Patrick Kypson

The following players received entry from the qualifying draw:

- (France) Jaimee Floyd Angele
- (United States) Ryan Harrison
- (United States) Toby Kodat
- (United States) Aidan Mayo
- (Croatia) Matija Pecotić
- (United States) Alfredo Perez

== Champions ==
=== Singles ===
- (United States) Aleksandar Kovacevic def. (China) Wu Yibing 3–6, 7–5, 7–6^{(7–2)}.

=== Doubles ===
- (United States) Robert Galloway / (Mexico) Hans Hach Verdugo def. (Philippines) Ruben Gonzales / (United States) Reese Stalder 3–6, 7–5, [10–6].
