= 2026 Cleveland Open – Singles =

Singles
- 2026 Cleveland Open

Final
- Champion: (United States) Colton Smith
- Runner-up: (Croatia) Borna Gojo
- Score: 6–4, 7–5

Events
Singles	Doubles
- Cleveland Open

Colton Smith was the defending champion and successfully defended his title after defeating Borna Gojo 6–4, 7–5 in the final.

== Seeds ==
1. (Japan) Sho Shimabukuro (first round)
2. (United States) Colton Smith (champion)
3. (United States) Tristan Boyer (second round)
4. (Australia) Bernard Tomic (first round)
5. (United States) Murphy Cassone (first round)
6. (United States) Andres Martin (second round)
7. (United States) Stefan Kozlov (quarterfinals)
8. (United States) Alex Rybakov (first round)

== Draw ==
Key

- Q = Qualifier
- WC = Wild card
- LL = Lucky loser
- Alt = Alternate
- ITF = ITF entry
- PR = Protected ranking
- SR = Special ranking
- SE = Special exempt
- JE = Junior exempt
- JR = Junior Accelerator Programme entrant
- CO = College Accelerator Programme entrant
- NG = Next Gen Accelerator Program entrant
- w/o = Walkover
- r = Retired
- d = Defaulted

=== Finals ===
Semifinals
Q	(United States) Joshua Sheehy	3	6^{8}
(Croatia) Borna Gojo	6	7^{10}
(United States) Keegan Smith	6^{4}	1
2	(United States) Colton Smith	7^{7}	6

Final
(Croatia) Borna Gojo	4	5
2	(United States) Colton Smith	6	7

=== Top half ===
First round
1	(Japan) S Shimabukuro	3	4
(Canada) D Martin	6	6
(United States) D Milavsky	6	6
WC	(United States) K Bigun	4	3
Q	(United States) J Sheehy	7^{7}	7^{7}
WC	(United States) K Poling	6^{1}	6^{4}
(United States) Andre Ilagan	6^{7}	6	5
6	(United States) A Martin	7^{9}	3	7
3	(United States) T Boyer	6	6
(United States) G Johns	4	4
JR	(United States) J Kennedy	0	0
(Croatia) B Gojo	6	6
WC	(United States) Lincoln Battle	3	4
Q	(Canada) J Boulais	6	6
Q	(United States) Q Vandecasteele	7^{7}	6
5	(United States) M Cassone	6^{2}	3

Second round
(Canada) D Martin	6^{1}	3
(United States) D Milavsky	7^{7}	6
Q	(United States) J Sheehy	7^{7}	6
6	(United States) A Martin	6^{3}	3
3	(United States) T Boyer	4	2
(Croatia) B Gojo	6	6
Q	(Canada) J Boulais	2	4
Q	(United States) Q Vandecasteele	6	6

Quarterfinals
(United States) D Milavsky	6^{4}	7^{7}	6^{6}
Q	(United States) J Sheehy	7^{7}	6^{0}	7^{8}
(Croatia) B Gojo	6	6
Q	(United States) Q Vandecasteele	4	4

Semifinals
Q	(United States) J Sheehy	3	6^{8}
(Croatia) B Gojo	6	7^{10}

=== Bottom half ===
First round
7	(United States) S Kozlov	3	6	6
(Germany) C-M Stebe	6	2	3
(France) Raphael Perot	6	4	6
Alt	(Japan) J Friend	2	6	3
(United States) T Zink	3	7^{7}	6^{3}
(United States) K Smith	6	6^{5}	7^{7}
(France) A Ghibaudo	6	6
4	(Australia) B Tomic	1	3
8	(United States) A Rybakov	6^{6}	3
(United States) Christian Langmo	7^{8}	6
Q	(United States) Matt Kuhar	1	2
Q	(United States) S Dostanic	6	6
(India) Aryan Shah	6	3	4
Q	(United Kingdom) B Jones	4	6	6
(United States) C Kingsley	6	6^{6}	4
2	(United States) C Smith	3	7^{8}	6

Second round
7	(United States) S Kozlov	7^{7}	3	6
(France) R Perot	6^{5}	6	3
(United States) K Smith	7^{7}	7
(France) A Ghibaudo	6^{4}	5
(United States) C Langmo	3	7^{10}	4
Q	(United States) S Dostanic	6	6^{8}	6
Q	(United Kingdom) B Jones	1	5
2	(United States) C Smith	6	7

Quarterfinals
7	(United States) S Kozlov	3	2
(United States) K Smith	6	6
Q	(United States) S Dostanic	4	6^{4}
2	(United States) C Smith	6	7^{7}

Semifinals
(United States) K Smith	6^{4}	1
2	(United States) C Smith	7^{7}	6
