= 2019 Cleveland Open =

- Date: 28 January – 3 February
- Edition: 1st
- Draw: 48S / 4Q / 16D
- Surface: Hard
- Location: Cleveland, United States

Champions

Singles
- (United States) Maxime Cressy

Doubles
- (Monaco) Romain Arneodo / (Belarus) Andrei Vasilevski
- Cleveland Open

The 2019 Cleveland Open was a professional tennis tournament played on hard courts. It was the first edition of the tournament which was part of the 2019 ATP Challenger Tour. It took place in Cleveland, United States between January 28 and February 3, 2019.

== Singles main-draw entrants ==
=== Seeds ===
Country	Player	Rank^{1}	Seed
TPE	Jason Jung	120	1
SRB	Miomir Kecmanović	125	2
USA	Noah Rubin	140	3
GER	Dominik Köpfer	160	4
BAR	Darian King	171	5
USA	Tim Smyczek	172	6
ECU	Roberto Quiroz	181	7
CAN	Brayden Schnur	196	8
~~ESA~~	~~Marcelo Arévalo~~	~~220~~	~~9~~
GER	Dustin Brown	223	10
BRA	Thomaz Bellucci	225	11
USA	Donald Young	231	12
CAN	Filip Peliwo	240	13
USA	Christian Harrison	242	14
USA	Marcos Giron	249	15
DOM	Roberto Cid Subervi	250	16

- ^{1} Rankings are as of 14 January 2019.

=== Other entrants ===
The following players received wildcards into the singles main draw:

- (United States) Felix Corwin
- (United States) Michael Redlicki
- (United States) Noah Rubin
- (United States) Ryan Shane
- (United States) J. J. Wolf

The following players received entry into the singles main draw using their ITF World Tennis Ranking:

- (Netherlands) Gijs Brouwer
- (Argentina) Matías Franco Descotte
- (France) Tom Jomby
- (Germany) Louis Wessels

The following players received entry from the qualifying draw:

- (United States) Maxime Cressy
- (United States) Jared Hiltzik

The following player received entry as a lucky loser:

- (Ecuador) Gonzalo Escobar

== Champions ==
=== Singles ===
- (United States) Maxime Cressy def. (Denmark) Mikael Torpegaard 6–7^{(4–7)}, 7–6^{(8–6)}, 6–3.

=== Doubles ===
- (Monaco) Romain Arneodo / (Belarus) Andrei Vasilevski def. (United States) Robert Galloway / (United States) Nathaniel Lammons 6–4, 7–6^{(7–4)}.
