= 2019 Cleveland Open – Doubles =

Doubles
- 2019 Cleveland Open

Final
- Champions: (Monaco) Romain Arneodo (Belarus) Andrei Vasilevski
- Runners-up: (United States) Robert Galloway (United States) Nathaniel Lammons
- Score: 6–4, 7–6^{(7–4)}

Events
Singles	Doubles
- Cleveland Open

This was the first edition of the tournament.

Romain Arneodo and Andrei Vasilevski won the title after defeating Robert Galloway and Nathaniel Lammons 6–4, 7–6^{(7–4)} in the final.

== Seeds ==
1. (Monaco) Romain Arneodo / (Belarus) Andrei Vasilevski (champions)
2. (United States) Robert Galloway / (United States) Nathaniel Lammons (final)
3. (Philippines) Ruben Gonzales / (United States) Nathan Pasha (first round)
4. (India) Sriram Balaji / (Mexico) Hans Hach Verdugo (quarterfinals)

== Draw ==
Key

- Q = Qualifier
- WC = Wild card
- LL = Lucky loser
- Alt = Alternate
- ITF = ITF entry
- PR = Protected ranking
- SR = Special ranking
- SE = Special exempt
- JE = Junior exempt
- JR = Junior Accelerator Programme entrant
- CO = College Accelerator Programme entrant
- NG = Next Gen Accelerator Program entrant
- w/o = Walkover
- r = Retired
- d = Defaulted

First round
1	(Monaco) R Arneodo (Belarus) A Vasilevski	6	7^{7}
(Ecuador) R Quiroz (Brazil) F Romboli	1	6^{4}
(Germany) D Brown (Portugal) G Oliveira	3	7^{7}	[10]
(South Africa) R Roelofse (United States) N Rubin	6	6^{4}	[8]
3	(Philippines) R Gonzales (United States) N Pasha	4	6^{5}
ITF	(Netherlands) G Brouwer (Argentina) MF Descotte	6	7^{7}
WC	(United States) Ian Dempster (United States) Robert Kelly	6	6
WC	(United States) Paul Gota (United States) Nico Mostardi	4	2
ITF	(United States) M Cressy (Portugal) B Saraiva	1	7^{7}	[4]
(United States) E King (United States) H Reese	6	6^{4}	[10]
(Ecuador) G Escobar (Venezuela) R Maytín	5	1
4	(India) S Balaji (Mexico) H Hach Verdugo	7	6
WC	(United States) S Kozlov (United States) A Lawson	3	4
(Croatia) A Pavić (Italy) A Vavassori	6	6
(Venezuela) LD Martínez (Sweden) A Siljeström	2	4
2	(United States) R Galloway (United States) N Lammons	6	6

Quarterfinals
1	(Monaco) R Arneodo (Belarus) A Vasilevski	7^{7}	3	[11]
(Germany) D Brown (Portugal) G Oliveira	6^{5}	6	[9]
ITF	(Netherlands) G Brouwer (Argentina) MF Descotte	4	2
WC	(United States) I Dempster (United States) R Kelly	6	6
(United States) E King (United States) H Reese	6	6
4	(India) S Balaji (Mexico) H Hach Verdugo	3	4
(Croatia) A Pavić (Italy) A Vavassori
2	(United States) R Galloway (United States) N Lammons	w/o

Semifinals
1	(Monaco) R Arneodo (Belarus) A Vasilevski	7^{7}	6
WC	(United States) I Dempster (United States) R Kelly	6^{5}	4
(United States) E King (United States) H Reese	6^{6}	7	[11]
2	(United States) R Galloway (United States) N Lammons	7^{8}	5	[13]

Final
1	(Monaco) R Arneodo (Belarus) A Vasilevski	6	7^{7}
2	(United States) R Galloway (United States) N Lammons	4	6^{4}
