= 2020 Cleveland Open – Doubles =

Professional tennis tournament

Doubles
- 2020 Cleveland Open

Final
- Champions: (Philippines) Treat Huey (United States) Nathaniel Lammons
- Runners-up: (Australia) Luke Saville (Australia) John-Patrick Smith
- Score: 7–5, 6–2

Events
Singles	Doubles
- Cleveland Open

Romain Arneodo and Andrei Vasilevski were the defending champions but chose not to defend their title.

Treat Huey and Nathaniel Lammons won the title after defeating Luke Saville and John-Patrick Smith 7–5, 6–2 in the final.

== Seeds ==
1. (Australia) Luke Saville / (Australia) John-Patrick Smith (final)
2. (South Korea) Nam Ji-sung / (South Korea) Song Min-kyu (quarterfinals)
3. (Venezuela) Luis David Martínez / (Mexico) Miguel Ángel Reyes-Varela (first round)
4. (United States) Dennis Novikov / (Portugal) Gonçalo Oliveira (first round)

== Draw ==
Key

- Q = Qualifier
- WC = Wild card
- LL = Lucky loser
- Alt = Alternate
- ITF = ITF entry
- PR = Protected ranking
- SR = Special ranking
- SE = Special exempt
- JE = Junior exempt
- JR = Junior Accelerator Programme entrant
- CO = College Accelerator Programme entrant
- NG = Next Gen Accelerator Program entrant
- w/o = Walkover
- r = Retired
- d = Defaulted

First round
1	(Australia) L Saville (Australia) J-P Smith	7^{7}	6
WC	(United States) C Harrison (United States) R Harrison	6^{4}	3
(Austria) S Ofner (Ecuador) R Quiroz	4	2
(United States) J Cerretani (United States) M Cressy	6	6
3	(Venezuela) LD Martínez (Mexico) MÁ Reyes-Varela	6^{8}	5
(Dominican Republic) R Cid Subervi (Tunisia) S Mansouri	7^{10}	7
(United Kingdom) L Glasspool (United States) A Lawson	6	6
(Philippines) R Gonzales (South Africa) R Roelofse	3	4
(Kazakhstan) D Popko (Chile) A Tabilo	4	5
(Philippines) T Huey (United States) N Lammons	6	7
WC	(United States) Ian Dempster (United States) K Lovett	6	4	[10]
4	(United States) D Novikov (Portugal) G Oliveira	4	6	[8]
(United States) N Pasha (United States) Ma Redlicki	2	1
(United States) R Galloway (Mexico) H Hach Verdugo	6	6
WC	(United Kingdom) James Hopper (United States) Nico Mostardi	4	4
2	(South Korea) J-s Nam (South Korea) M-k Song	6	6

Quarterfinals
1	(Australia) L Saville (Australia) J-P Smith	6	6
(United States) J Cerretani (United States) M Cressy	4	4
(Dominican Republic) R Cid Subervi (Tunisia) S Mansouri	3	6^{8}
(United Kingdom) L Glasspool (United States) A Lawson	6	7^{10}
(Philippines) T Huey (United States) N Lammons	7^{10}	6
WC	(United States) I Dempster (United States) K Lovett	6^{8}	4
(United States) R Galloway (Mexico) H Hach Verdugo	6	7^{10}
2	(South Korea) J-s Nam (South Korea) M-k Song	3	6^{8}

Semifinals
1	(Australia) L Saville (Australia) J-P Smith	6^{6}	6	[10]
(United Kingdom) L Glasspool (United States) A Lawson	7^{8}	4	[6]
(Philippines) T Huey (United States) N Lammons	6	7^{7}
(United States) R Galloway (Mexico) H Hach Verdugo	3	6^{5}

Final
1	(Australia) L Saville (Australia) J-P Smith	5	2
(Philippines) T Huey (United States) N Lammons	7	6
