= 2024 Cleveland Open – Singles =

Singles
- 2024 Cleveland Open

Final
- Champion: (United States) Patrick Kypson
- Runner-up: (United States) Ethan Quinn
- Score: 4–6, 6–3, 6–2

Events
Singles	Doubles
- Cleveland Open

Aleksandar Kovacevic was the defending champion but chose not to defend his title.

Patrick Kypson won the title after defeating Ethan Quinn 4–6, 6–3, 6–2 in the final.

== Seeds ==
1. (Australia) James Duckworth (semifinals)
2. (United States) Zachary Svajda (first round)
3. (United States) Emilio Nava (quarterfinals)
4. (United States) Denis Kudla (semifinals)
5. (United States) Patrick Kypson (champion)
6. (United States) Tennys Sandgren (quarterfinals)
7. (United States) Mitchell Krueger (second round)
8. (United States) Aidan Mayo (first round)

== Draw ==
Key

- Q = Qualifier
- WC = Wild card
- LL = Lucky loser
- Alt = Alternate
- ITF = ITF entry
- PR = Protected ranking
- SR = Special ranking
- SE = Special exempt
- JE = Junior exempt
- JR = Junior Accelerator Programme entrant
- CO = College Accelerator Programme entrant
- NG = Next Gen Accelerator Program entrant
- w/o = Walkover
- r = Retired
- d = Defaulted

=== Finals ===
Semifinals
1	(Australia) James Duckworth	3	6^{1}
5	(United States) Patrick Kypson	6	7^{7}
4	(United States) Denis Kudla	3	4
(United States) Ethan Quinn	6	6

Final
5	(United States) Patrick Kypson	4	6	6
(United States) Ethan Quinn	6	3	2

=== Top half ===
First round
1	(Australia) J Duckworth	6	6
(United States) T Kodat	3	0
Q	(United States) Patrick Maloney	6	6
LL	(United States) Ezekiel Clark	2	3
WC	(United States) Q Vandecasteele	6	4	7^{7}
(United States) B Kuzuhara	4	6	6^{3}
Alt	(Australia) T Fancutt	4	5
7	(United States) M Krueger	6	7
3	(United States) E Nava	7^{7}	6
Q	(Romania) GA Boitan	6^{4}	1
(Germany) Lucas Gerch	3	2
Q	(United Kingdom) Patrick Brady	6	6
WC	(United States) M Cassone	6	7^{9}
Alt	(Dominican Republic) R Cid Subervi	1	6^{7}
(United States) Nathan Ponwith	3	2
5	(United States) P Kypson	6	6

Second round
1	(Australia) J Duckworth	6	6
Q	(United States) P Maloney	4	3
WC	(United States) Q Vandecasteele	6	6^{7}	7
7	(United States) M Krueger	4	7^{9}	5
3	(United States) E Nava	6	6
Q	(United Kingdom) P Brady	3	2
WC	(United States) M Cassone	4	6^{4}
5	(United States) P Kypson	6	7^{7}

Quarterfinals
1	(Australia) J Duckworth	6	7
WC	(United States) Q Vandecasteele	3	5
3	(United States) E Nava	6	6^{1}	4
5	(United States) P Kypson	4	7^{7}	6

Semifinals
1	(Australia) J Duckworth	3	6^{1}
5	(United States) P Kypson	6	7^{7}

=== Bottom half ===
First round
6	(United States) T Sandgren	6^{6}	7	6
(Germany) T Handel	7^{8}	5	4
(Germany) S Fanselow	7^{7}	6
Q	(United States) William Grant	6^{3}	1
Alt	(United States) N Rubin	5	6	7
Q	(Croatia) M Pecotić	7	3	5
WC	(United States) K Smith	6	4	4
4	(United States) D Kudla	1	6	6
8	(United States) A Mayo	3	3
(United States) E Quinn	6	6
Q	(United States) S Kozlov	3	6	7^{7}
(United States) S Kirchheimer	6	1	6^{3}
(United States) T-S Kwiatkowski	6	6
(United States) N Chappell	3	2
(Japan) J Trotter	4	6	7^{7}
2	(United States) Z Svajda	6	3	6^{1}

Second round
6	(United States) T Sandgren	6	7^{7}
(Germany) S Fanselow	0	6^{4}
Alt	(United States) N Rubin	1	3
4	(United States) D Kudla	6	6
(United States) E Quinn	6	4	6
Q	(United States) S Kozlov	2	6	3
(United States) T-S Kwiatkowski	6	7^{7}
(Japan) J Trotter	4	6^{3}

Quarterfinals
6	(United States) T Sandgren	4	7	2
4	(United States) D Kudla	6	5	6
(United States) E Quinn	7^{9}	5	6
(United States) T-S Kwiatkowski	6^{7}	7	4

Semifinals
4	(United States) D Kudla	3	4
(United States) E Quinn	6	6
