= 2025 Cleveland Open =

- Date: January 27 – February 2
- Edition: 7th
- Surface: Hard (indoor)
- Location: Cleveland, Ohio, United States

Champions

Singles
- (United States) Colton Smith

Doubles
- (United States) Robert Cash / (United States) JJ Tracy
- Cleveland Open

The 2025 Cleveland Open was a professional tennis tournament played on indoor hardcourts. It was the seventh edition of the tournament which was part of the 2025 ATP Challenger Tour. It took place in Cleveland, Ohio, United States between January 27 and February 2, 2025.

== Singles main-draw entrants ==
=== Seeds ===
Country	Player	Rank^{1}	Seed
ARG	Federico Agustín Gómez	134	1
MDA	Radu Albot	157	2
USA	Ethan Quinn	166	3
JPN	James Trotter	186	4
USA	Brandon Holt	210	5
USA	Eliot Spizzirri	232	6
BRA	Karue Sell	260	7
USA	J. J. Wolf	264	8

- ^{1} Rankings are as of January 13, 2025.

=== Other entrants ===
The following players received wildcards into the singles main draw:

- (United States) Kaylan Bigun
- (United States) Jenson Brooksby
- (France) Antoine Ghibaudo

The following player received entry into the singles main draw using a protected ranking:

- (North Macedonia) Kalin Ivanovski

The following players received entry from the qualifying draw:

- (United States) Trey Hilderbrand
- (United States) Tristan McCormick
- (Poland) Filip Pieczonka
- (United States) Nathan Ponwith
- (United States) Jackson Ross
- (United States) Alex Rybakov

== Champions ==
=== Singles ===
- (United States) Colton Smith def. (United States) Eliot Spizzirri 6–4, 6–7^{(6–8)}, 6–3.

=== Doubles ===
- (United States) Robert Cash / (United States) JJ Tracy def. (Canada) Juan Carlos Aguilar / (Poland) Filip Pieczonka 7–6^{(7–4)}, 6–1.
