= 2025 Cleveland Open – Doubles =

Doubles
- 2025 Cleveland Open

Final
- Champions: (United States) Robert Cash (United States) JJ Tracy
- Runners-up: (Canada) Juan Carlos Aguilar (Poland) Filip Pieczonka
- Score: 7–6^{(7–4)}, 6–1

Events
Singles	Doubles
- Cleveland Open

George Goldhoff and James Trotter were the defending champions but chose to defend their title with different partners. Goldhoff partnered Trey Hilderbrand but lost in the quarterfinals to Felix Corwin and Tennyson Whiting. Trotter partnered Hans Hach Verdugo but lost in the quarterfinals to Pranav Kumar and Noah Schachter.

Robert Cash and JJ Tracy won the title after defeating Juan Carlos Aguilar and Filip Pieczonka 7–6^{(7–4)}, 6–1 in the final.

== Seeds ==
1. (United States) Robert Cash / (United States) JJ Tracy (champions)
2. (United States) George Goldhoff / (United States) Trey Hilderbrand (quarterfinals)
3. (Mexico) Hans Hach Verdugo / (Japan) James Trotter (quarterfinals)
4. (United States) Mac Kiger / (Canada) Benjamin Sigouin (first round)

== Draw ==
Key

- Q = Qualifier
- WC = Wild card
- LL = Lucky loser
- Alt = Alternate
- ITF = ITF entry
- PR = Protected ranking
- SR = Special ranking
- SE = Special exempt
- JE = Junior exempt
- JR = Junior Accelerator Programme entrant
- CO = College Accelerator Programme entrant
- NG = Next Gen Accelerator Program entrant
- w/o = Walkover
- r = Retired
- d = Defaulted

=== Draw ===
First round
1	(United States) R Cash (United States) JJ Tracy	2	7^{8}	[10]
(United States) E Spizzirri (United States) T Zink	6	6^{6}	[7]
(United States) E Quinn (United States) A Rybakov	7^{7}	6
(United States) Maxwell McKennon (United States) Nathan Ponwith	6^{3}	4
3	(Mexico) H Hach Verdugo (Japan) J Trotter	6	6
(Argentina) FA Gómez (United States) Jamie Vance	4	4
(United States) P Kumar (United States) N Schachter	7^{9}	6
WC	(United States) Anmay Devaraj (United States) Casey Hishinuma	6^{7}	2
(United States) A Ayeni (United States) S Kirchheimer	7^{7}	6
(United States) S Bangoura (Israel) R Stepanov	6^{1}	4
(Canada) JC Aguilar (Poland) F Pieczonka	4	7	[10]
4	(United States) M Kiger (Canada) B Sigouin	6	5	[6]
(United States) Felix Corwin (United States) Tennyson Whiting	7	6
WC	(United States) Benjamin Pomeranets (United States) Chase Thomas	5	3
(United States) Boris Kozlov (United States) S Kozlov	1	1
2	(United States) G Goldhoff (United States) T Hilderbrand	6	6

Quarterfinals
1	(United States) R Cash (United States) JJ Tracy	w/o
(United States) E Quinn (United States) A Rybakov
3	(Mexico) H Hach Verdugo (Japan) J Trotter	3	6^{4}
(United States) P Kumar (United States) N Schachter	6	7^{7}
(United States) A Ayeni (United States) S Kirchheimer	1	4
(Canada) JC Aguilar (Poland) F Pieczonka	6	6
(United States) F Corwin (United States) T Whiting	6^{6}	6	[10]
2	(United States) G Goldhoff (United States) T Hilderbrand	7^{8}	4	[2]

Semifinals
1	(United States) R Cash (United States) JJ Tracy	7	5	[10]
(United States) P Kumar (United States) N Schachter	5	7	[5]
(Canada) JC Aguilar (Poland) F Pieczonka	7	6
(United States) F Corwin (United States) T Whiting	5	3

Final
1	(United States) R Cash (United States) JJ Tracy	7^{7}	6
(Canada) JC Aguilar (Poland) F Pieczonka	6^{4}	1
