= 2023 Cleveland Open – Doubles =

Doubles
- 2023 Cleveland Open

Final
- Champions: (United States) Robert Galloway (Mexico) Hans Hach Verdugo
- Runners-up: (Philippines) Ruben Gonzales (United States) Reese Stalder
- Score: 3–6, 7–5, [10–6]

Events
Singles	Doubles
- Cleveland Open

William Blumberg and Max Schnur were the defending champions but only Blumberg chose to defend his title, partnering Keegan Smith. Blumberg lost in the first round to Nick Chappell and Alex Michelsen.

Robert Galloway and Hans Hach Verdugo won the title after defeating Ruben Gonzales and Reese Stalder 3–6, 7–5, [10–6] in the final.

== Seeds ==
1. (United States) Robert Galloway / (Mexico) Hans Hach Verdugo (champions)
2. (Philippines) Ruben Gonzales / (United States) Reese Stalder (final)
3. (United States) William Blumberg / (United States) Keegan Smith (first round)
4. (United States) Ezekiel Clark / (United States) Alfredo Perez (quarterfinals)

== Draw ==
Key

- Q = Qualifier
- WC = Wild card
- LL = Lucky loser
- Alt = Alternate
- ITF = ITF entry
- PR = Protected ranking
- SR = Special ranking
- SE = Special exempt
- JE = Junior exempt
- JR = Junior Accelerator Programme entrant
- CO = College Accelerator Programme entrant
- NG = Next Gen Accelerator Program entrant
- w/o = Walkover
- r = Retired
- d = Defaulted

First round
1	(United States) R Galloway (Mexico) H Hach Verdugo	6	6
WC	(United States) Owen DeMuth (United States) Benjamin Pomeranets	0	3
(Antigua and Barbuda) J Maginley (United States) J Sheehy	6^{2}	7	[5]
(United States) S Kirchheimer (Canada) B Sigouin	7^{7}	5	[10]
3	(United States) W Blumberg (United States) K Smith	6^{5}	5
(United States) N Chappell (United States) A Michelsen	7^{7}	7
(United States) E King (United States) B Klahn	7^{7}	7
WC	(United Kingdom) James Hopper (United States) Roy Smith	6^{4}	5
(United States) Leanid Boika (Ukraine) I Marchenko	3	4
PR	(Czech Republic) J Forejtek (United States) T-S Kwiatkowski	6	6
(United States) P Kypson (United States) D Young	3	6^{3}
4	(United States) Ezekiel Clark (United States) A Perez	6	7^{7}
(Canada) G Diallo (United States) A Kovacevic	7^{7}	6
(Moldova) A Cozbinov (United States) E Zhu	6^{3}	4
(France) Martin Breysach (United States) G Goldhoff	6^{3}	1
2	(Philippines) R Gonzales (United States) R Stalder	7^{7}	6

Quarterfinals
1	(United States) R Galloway (Mexico) H Hach Verdugo	6	6
(United States) S Kirchheimer (Canada) B Sigouin	1	2
(United States) N Chappell (United States) A Michelsen	4	6	[10]
(United States) E King (United States) B Klahn	6	1	[4]
PR	(Czech Republic) J Forejtek (United States) T-S Kwiatkowski	7^{8}	6
4	(United States) E Clark (United States) A Perez	6^{6}	3
(Canada) G Diallo (United States) A Kovacevic	2	3
2	(Philippines) R Gonzales (United States) R Stalder	6	6

Semifinals
1	(United States) R Galloway (Mexico) H Hach Verdugo	7^{8}	7^{7}
(United States) N Chappell (United States) A Michelsen	6^{6}	6^{4}
PR	(Czech Republic) J Forejtek (United States) T-S Kwiatkowski	6^{6}	5
2	(Philippines) R Gonzales (United States) R Stalder	7^{8}	7

Final
1	(United States) R Galloway (Mexico) H Hach Verdugo	3	7	[10]
2	(Philippines) R Gonzales (United States) R Stalder	6	5	[6]
