= Colton Smith (tennis) =

American tennis player (born 2003)

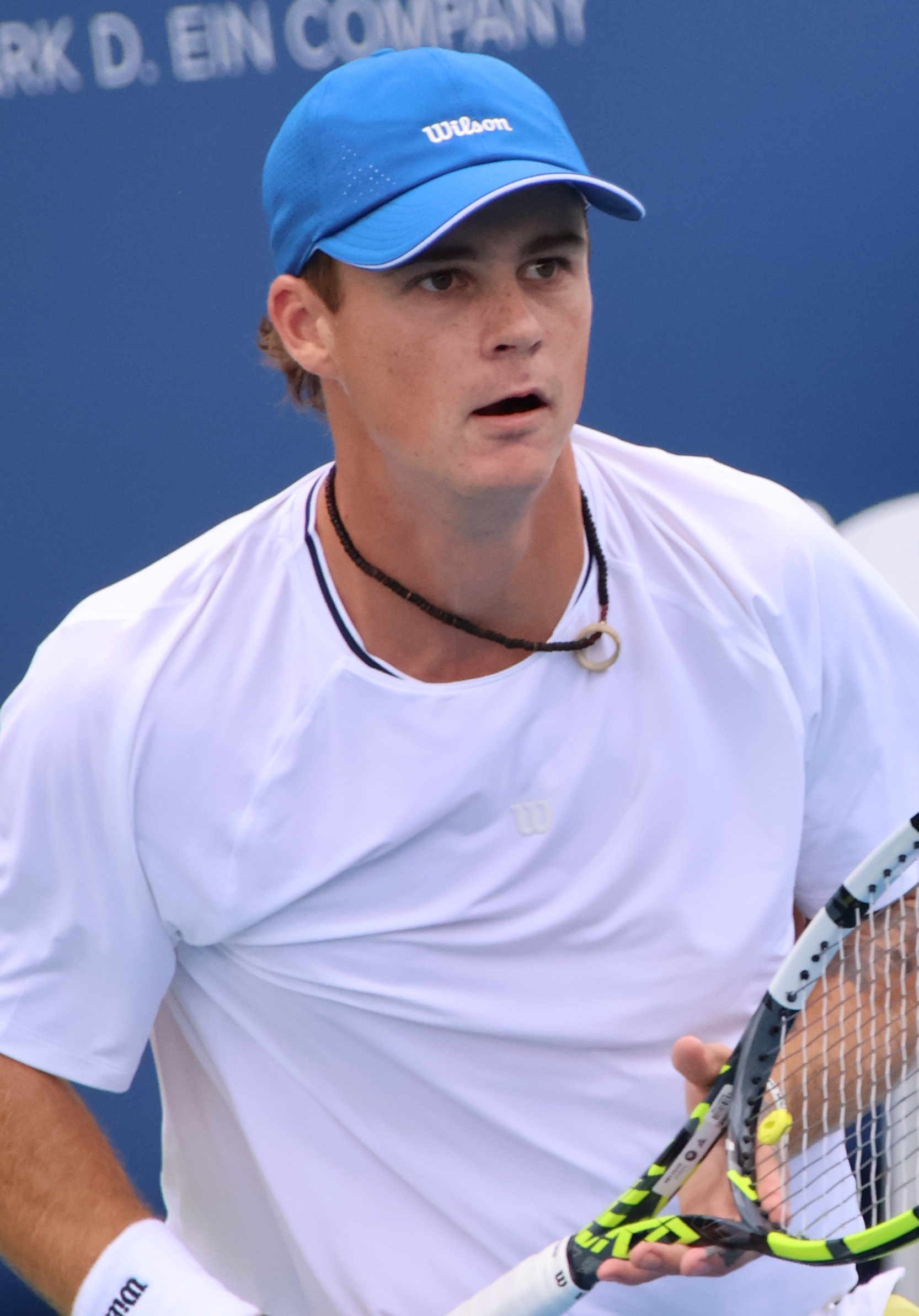
- Smith at the 2025 Washington Open
- Country (sports): United States
- Born: March 5, 2003 (age 23) Olympia, Washington, U.S.
- Height: 6 ft 0 in (1.83 m)
- Plays: Right-handed (two-handed backhand)
- College: Arizona
- Coach: Rhyne Williams
- Prize money: US $555,882

Singles
- Career record: 3–7 (at ATP Tour level, Grand Slam level, and in Davis Cup)
- Career titles: 0
- Highest ranking: No. 133 (25 August 2025)
- Current ranking: No. 222 (31 August 2026)

Grand Slam singles results
- Australian Open: Q2 (2026)
- French Open: Q2 (2026)
- Wimbledon: Q3 (2026)
- US Open: Q3 (2026)

Doubles
- Career record: 0–1 (at ATP Tour level, Grand Slam level, and in Davis Cup)
- Career titles: 0
- Highest ranking: No. 2,164 (14 July 2025)

Grand Slam doubles results
- US Open: 1R (2025)
- Last updated on: 31 August 2026.

Colton Smith (born March 5, 2003) is an American professional tennis player. He has a career-high ATP singles ranking of world No. 133 achieved on 25 August 2025.

Smith played college tennis at University of Arizona.

== Professional career ==
=== 2024: First Challenger final ===
Smith reached his first Challenger final at the Sioux Falls Challenger losing to Borna Gojo in the final.

=== 2025: Maiden Challenger title, ATP Tour debut ===
Smith won his maiden Challenger singles title at the 2025 Cleveland Open.

Smith qualified at the 2025 Indian Wells Open making his ATP Tour and also Masters 1000 main draw debut and defeated Flavio Cobolli to record his first tour-level win.

At the 2025 U.S. Men's Clay Court Championships, Smith qualified and reached the quarterfinals for the first time in an ATP Tour event, first defeating James Duckworth in straight sets, and then defeating 2023 NCAA champion Ethan Quinn also in straight sets before losing to top seed Tommy Paul in the quarterfinal.

In July, Smith played his second Masters 1000, qualifying for the main draw at the National Bank Open in Toronto but lost to Learner Tien in the first round.

== Performance timelines ==
Key
W	F	SF	QF	#R	RR	Q#	P#	DNQ	A	Z#	PO	G	S	B	NMS	NTI	P	NH

(W) winner; (F) finalist; (SF) semifinalist; (QF) quarterfinalist; (#R) rounds 4, 3, 2, 1; (RR) round-robin stage; (Q#) qualification round; (P#) preliminary round; (DNQ) did not qualify; (A) absent; (Z#) Davis/Fed Cup Zonal Group (with number indication) or (PO) play-off; (G) gold, (S) silver or (B) bronze Olympic/Paralympic medal; (NMS) not a Masters tournament; (NTI) not a Tier I tournament; (P) postponed; (NH) not held; (SR) strike rate (events won / competed); (W–L) win–loss record.
To avoid confusion and double counting, these charts are updated at the conclusion of a tournament or when the player's participation has ended.

=== Singles ===
Current through the 2025 Cincinnati Open.

Tournament	2024	2025	2026	SR	W–L	Win%
Grand Slam tournaments
Australian Open	A	A	Q2	0 / 0	0–0	–
French Open	A	Q1		0 / 0	0–0	–
Wimbledon	A	Q2		0 / 0	0–0	–
US Open	A	Q1		0 / 0	0–0	–
Win–loss	0–0	0–0	0–0	0 / 0	0–0	–
ATP Masters 1000
Indian Wells Open	A	2R	Q1	0 / 1	1–1	50%
Miami Open	A	A	Q1	0 / 0	0–0	–
Monte-Carlo Masters	A	A		0 / 0	0–0	–
Madrid Open	A	A		0 / 0	0–0	–
Italian Open	A	A		0 / 0	0–0	–
Canadian Open	A	1R		0 / 1	0–1	0%
Cincinnati Open	A	1R		0 / 1	0–1	0%
Shanghai Masters	A	Q1		0 / 0	0–0	–
Paris Masters	A	A		0 / 0	0–0	–
Win–loss	0–0	1–3	0–0	0 / 3	1–3	25%
Career statistics
Tournaments	0	6	0	6		
Overall win–loss	0–0	3–6	0–0	3–6		
Year-end ranking	365	146		33%		

== ATP Challenger and ITF World Tennis Tour finals ==
=== Singles: 8 (4 titles, 4 runner-ups) ===
Legend ATP Challenger Tour (3–2) ITF WTT (1–2)	Finals by surface Hard (4–3) Clay (0–0) Grass (0–1) Carpet (0–0)

Result	W–L	Date	Tournament	Tier	Surface	Opponent	Score
Loss	0–1	Oct 2024	Sioux Falls Challenger, US	Challenger	Hard (i)	(Croatia) Borna Gojo	1–6, 5–7
Win	1–1	Jan 2025	Cleveland Open, US	Challenger	Hard (i)	(United States) Eliot Spizzirri	6–4, 6–7^{(6–8)}, 6–3
Loss	1–2	Jun 2025	Birmingham Classic, UK	Challenger	Grass	(Finland) Otto Virtanen	4–6, 4–6
Win	2–2	Feb 2026	Cleveland Open, US	Challenger	Hard (i)	(Croatia) Borna Gojo	6–4, 7–5
Win	3–2	May 2026	Little Rock Challenger, US	Challenger	Hard	(United States) Michael Mmoh	6–2, 6–4

Result	W–L	Date	Tournament	Tier	Surface	Opponent	Score
Loss	0–1	Jun 2024	M15 Los Angeles, US	WTT	Hard	(United States) Patrick Maloney	3–6, 6–1, 3–6
Loss	0–2	Jul 2024	M25 Dallas, US	WTT	Hard (i)	(United States) Adam Neff	6–7^{(5–7)}, 6–4, 2–6
Win	1–2	Jul 2024	M25 Champaign, US	WTT	Hard	(United States) Andre Ilagan	6–4, 6–3
