= JJ Tracy =

American tennis player (born 2002)

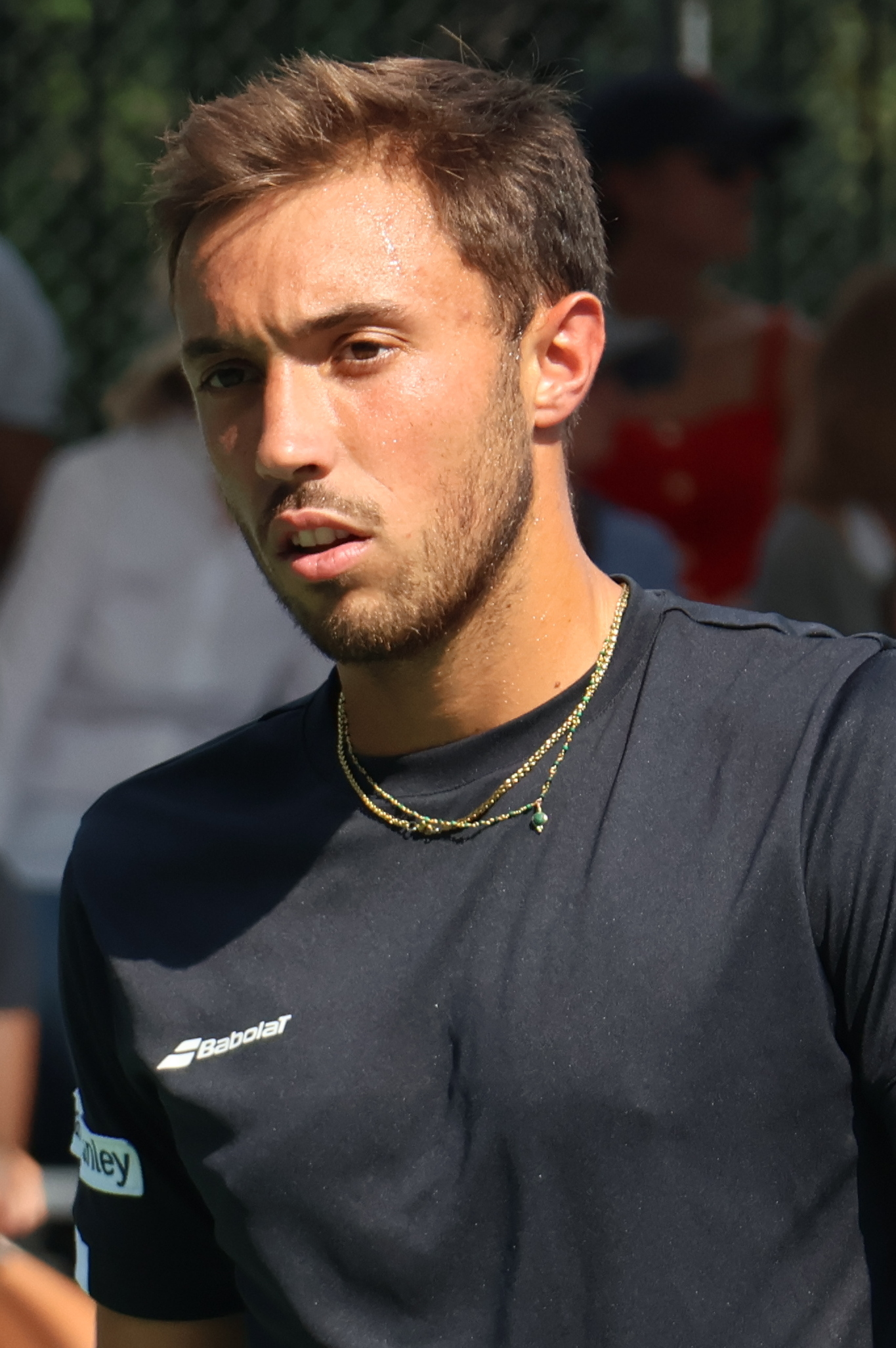
- Tracy at the 2024 Washington Open
- Full name: James Tracy
- Country (sports): United States
- Born: July 10, 2002 (age 24) Ann Arbor, Michigan, United States
- Height: 5 ft 11 in (1.80 m)
- Plays: Right-handed (two-handed backhand)
- College: Ohio State
- Coach: Andy Fitzell
- Prize money: US $641,151

Singles
- Career record: 0-0
- Career titles: 1 ITF
- Highest ranking: No. 668 (October 23, 2023)

Doubles
- Career record: 37–41 (at ATP Tour level, Grand Slam level, and in Davis Cup)
- Career titles: 3
- Highest ranking: No. 25 (June 8, 2026)
- Current ranking: No. 39 (August 31, 2026)

Grand Slam doubles results
- Australian Open: 3R (2026)
- French Open: 2R (2026)
- Wimbledon: 2R (2025, 2026)
- US Open: SF (2025)

Grand Slam mixed doubles results
- Australian Open: QF (2026)
- French Open: QF (2026)
- Wimbledon: 2R (2026)
- Last updated on: September 3, 2026.

James "JJ" Tracy (born July 10, 2002) is an American tennis player who specializes in doubles. He has a career-high ATP doubles ranking of world No. 25 achieved on June 8, 2026 and a singles ranking of No. 668 achieved on October 23, 2023.

== College career ==
Tracy plays college tennis at Ohio State University. He won the 2024 NCAA doubles title with partner Robert Cash.

== Professional career ==
Tracy won his first ITF title at the 2023 M15 tournament in South Bend, defeating fellow American Strong Kirchheimer 6–1, 6–2 in the final.

In 2024, Tracy won his first two ITF doubles tournaments in San Diego and Laval. Tracy made his ATP main draw debut at the 2024 Hall of Fame Open after receiving a wildcard into the doubles tournament with Robert Cash and the pair reached their first ATP final.

After winning the 2024 NCAA Doubles Championship, Tracy and Cash were given a wildcard into the 2024 US Open. They defeated Nicolás Jarry and Cristian Rodríguez in the first round, before losing to 16th-seeded Máximo González and Andrés Molteni in three sets.

He reached the top 100 at world No. 93 in the doubles rankings on 10 February 2025, following his Challenger title at the 2025 Cleveland Open partnering Cash. Alongside Cash, he won his first ATP Tour level title at the 2025 Los Cabos Open, defeating Blake Bayldon and Tristan Schoolkate in the final.

At the 2025 US Open Cash and Tracy reached a Grand Slam semifinal for the first time in their careers where they fell to Roland Garros and eventual US Open champions Marcel Granollers and Horacio Zeballos in three sets. As a result they reached new career-highs in the top 40 on 8 September 2025.

== ATP career finals ==
=== Doubles: 5 (3 titles, 2 runner-up) ===
Legend Grand Slam Tournaments (0–0) ATP Tour Finals (0–0) ATP Tour Masters 1000 (0–1) ATP Tour 500 Series (0–0) ATP Tour 250 Series (3–1)	Finals by surface Hard (2–1) Clay (1–0) Grass (0–1)	Finals by setting Outdoor (3–2) Indoor (0–0)

Result	W–L	Date	Tournament	Tier	Surface	Partner	Opponents	Score
Loss	0–1	Jul 2024	Hall of Fame Open, United States	250 Series	Grass	(United States) Robert Cash	(Sweden) André Göransson (Netherlands) Sem Verbeek	3–6, 4–6
Win	1–1	Jul 2025	Los Cabos Open, Mexico	250 Series	Hard	(United States) Robert Cash	(Australia) Blake Bayldon (Australia) Tristan Schoolkate	7–6^{(7–4)}, 6–4
Win	2–1	Mar 2026	Grand Prix Hassan II, Morocco	250 Series	Clay	(United States) Robert Cash	(United States) Vasil Kirkov (Netherlands) Bart Stevens	6–2, 6–3
Win	3–1	Sep 2026	Hangzhou Open, China	250 Series	Hard	(Portugal) Francisco Cabral	(Netherlands) Sander Arends (Netherlands) David Pel	7–5, 6–4
Loss	3–2	Oct 2026	Shanghai Masters, China	ATP 1000	Hard	(Portugal) Francisco Cabral	(Austria) Lucas Miedler (Austria) Neil Oberleitner	3–6, 4–6

== ATP Challenger and ITF World Tennis Tour finals ==
=== Singles: 3 (1 title, 2 runner-ups) ===
Legend ATP Challenger Tour (0–0) ITF World Tennis Tour (1–2)	Finals by surface Hard (1–2) Clay (0–0)

Result	W–L	Date	Tournament	Tier	Surface	Opponent	Score
Loss	0–1	Nov 2021	M25 Columbus, USA	World Tennis Tour	Hard (i)	(United States) John McNally	6–4, 6–7^{(2–7)}, 3–6
Win	1–1	Jun 2023	M15 South Bend, USA	World Tennis Tour	Hard	(United States) Strong Kirchheimer	6–1, 6–2
Loss	1–2	Jul 2023	M25 Laval, Canada	World Tennis Tour	Hard	(Jamaica) Blaise Bicknell	6–3, 3–6, 4–6

=== Doubles: 14 (12 titles, 2 runners-up) ===
Legend ATP Challenger Tour (10–1) ITF World Tennis Tour (2–1)	Finals by surface Hard (7–2) Clay (3–0) Grass (1–0)

Result	W–L	Date	Tournament	Tier	Surface	Partner	Opponents	Score
Loss	0–1	Nov 2021	M25 Columbus, USA	World Tennis Tour	Hard	(United States) Robert Cash	(Switzerland) Adrien Burdet (Switzerland) Leandro Riedi	6–7^{(5–7)}, 6–7^{(2–7)}
Win	1–1	Jun 2024	M15 San Diego, USA	World Tennis Tour	Hard	(United States) Nathan Ponwith	(Estonia) Johannes Seeman (United States) Wally Thayne	7–6^{(7–2)}, 6–2
Win	2–1	Jul 2024	M25 Laval, Canada	World Tennis Tour	Hard	(United States) Alexander Bernard	(Canada) Liam Draxl (Canada) Cleeve Harper	3–6, 6–4, [10–5]
Win	3–1	Aug 2024	Lincoln, USA	Challenger	Hard	(United States) Robert Cash	(Uruguay) Ariel Behar (United Kingdom) Luke Johnson	7–6^{(8–6)}, 6–3
Loss	3–2	Oct 2024	Calgary, Canada	Challenger	Hard	(United States) Robert Cash	(United States) Ryan Seggerman (United States) Patrik Trhac	3–6, 6–7^{(3–7)}
Win	4–2	Nov 2024	Charlottesville, USA	Challenger	Hard	(United States) Robert Cash	(Luxembourg) Chris Rodesch (United States) William Woodall	4–6, 7–6^{(9–7)}, [10–7]
Win	5–2	Nov 2024	Drummondville, Canada	Challenger	Hard	(United States) Robert Cash	(Canada) Liam Draxl (Canada) Cleeve Harper	6–2, 6–4
Win	6–2	Jan 2025	Cleveland, US	Challenger	Hard	(United States) Robert Cash	(Canada) Juan Carlos Aguilar (Poland) Filip Pieczonka	7–6^{(7–4)}, 6–1
Win	7–2	Apr 2025	Sarasota, US	Challenger	Clay (green)	(United States) Robert Cash	(Argentina) Federico Agustin Gomez (Venezuela) Luis David Martínez	6–4, 7–6^{(7–3)}
Win	8–2	Apr 2025	Aix-en-Provence, France	Challenger	Clay	(United States) Robert Cash	(France) Théo Arribagé (Monaco) Hugo Nys	7–5, 7–6^{(7–5)}
Win	9–2	Jul 2025	Newport, US	Challenger	Grass	(United States) Robert Cash	(Mexico) Hans Hach Verdugo (Colombia) Cristian Rodríguez	7–6^{(7–3)}, 6–3
Win	10–2	May 2026	Aix-en-Provence, France (2)	Challenger	Clay	(United States) Robert Cash	(United States) Vasil Kirkov (Netherlands) Bart Stevens	5–7, 6–4, [10–4]
Win	11–2	Jul 2026	Bloomfield Hills, United States	Challenger	Hard	(United States) Trey Hilderbrand	(Thailand) Pruchya Isaro (India) Niki Kaliyanda Poonacha	6–3, 7–6^{(7–2)}
Win	12–2	Sep 2026	Tiburon, United States	Challenger	Hard	(Mexico) Hans Hach Verdugo	(United States) Nathaniel Lammons (United States) Jackson Withrow	7–6^{(9–7)}, 6–4
