= Mikael Torpegaard =

Danish tennis player

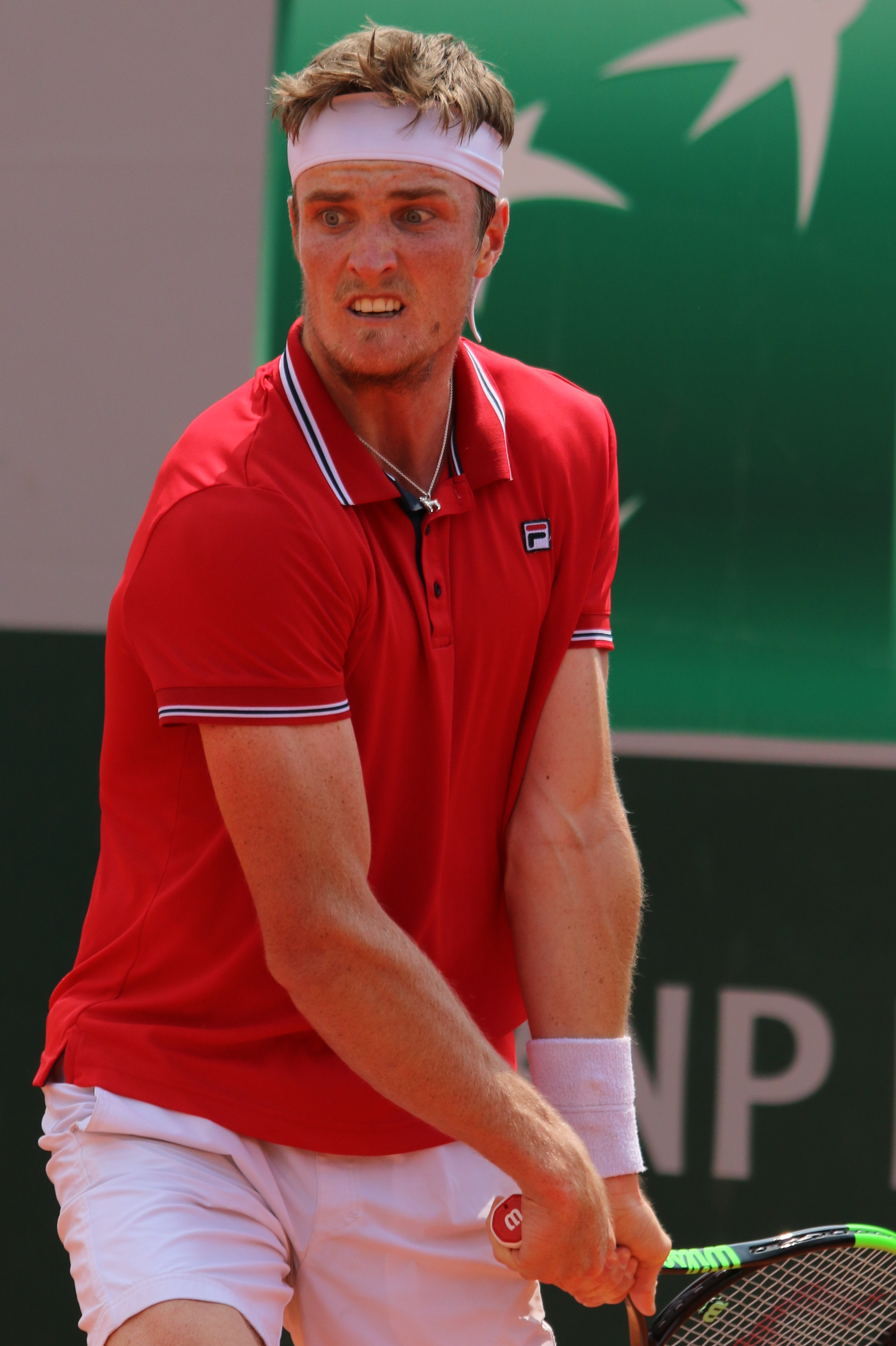
- Torpegaard at the 2019 French Open
- Country (sports): Denmark
- Residence: Gentofte, Denmark
- Born: 8 May 1994 (age 31); Gentofte, Denmark
- Height: 6 ft 4 in (193 cm)
- Turned pro: 2018
- Plays: Right-Handed, Two-Handed Backhand
- College: Ohio State University
- Prize money: US$ 339,360

Singles
- Career record: 5–7 (ATP Tour level, Grand Slam level, and Davis Cup)
- Career titles: 0
- Highest ranking: No. 166 (6 January 2020)

Grand Slam singles results
- Australian Open: 1R (2021)
- French Open: Q2 (2019)
- Wimbledon: Q2 (2019)
- US Open: Q2 (2019)

Doubles
- Career record: 0–1 (ATP Tour level, Grand Slam level, and Davis Cup)
- Career titles: 0
- Highest ranking: No. 339 (3 October 2022)
- Last updated on: 18 October 2024.

Mikael Torpegaard (born 8 May 1994) is a Danish professional tennis player. He was a member of the Denmark Davis Cup team.

== Earlier career ==
Torpegaard won his first career ATP Challenger $75,000 title at the 2016 Columbus Challenger, which is played at Ohio State, where Mikael went to college and became a five-time All-American and a two-time Big Ten Athlete of the Year, an achievement that ranks him among the most successful tennis players in Ohio State history.

== Professional career ==
=== 2019: ATP debut ===
Torpegaard qualified for his first ATP main draw at the 2019 Citi Open in Washington, USA where he lost to Marius Copil.

=== 2021: Grand Slam debut ===
Torpegaard made his Grand Slam main draw debut at the 2021 Australian Open as a lucky loser where he lost to Lloyd Harris.

== Davis Cup ==
On 22 September 2015 Torpegaard, representing host Denmark for the third time in Davis Cup play, played Rafael Nadal, losing 6–4, 6–3, 6–2.

== ATP Challenger Tour finals ==
=== Singles: 5 (3 titles, 2 runner-ups) ===
Legend ATP Challenger Tour (3–2)	Finals by surface Hard (3–2) Clay (0–0) Grass (0–0) Carpet (0–0)

Result	W–L	Date	Tournament	Tier	Surface	Opponent	Score
Win	1–0	Sep 2016	Columbus, USA	Challenger	Hard (i)	(Germany) Benjamin Becker	6–4, 1–6, 6–2
Loss	1–1	Jan 2019	Columbus, USA	Challenger	Hard (i)	(United States) J. J. Wolf	7–6^{(7–4)}, 3–6, 4–6
Loss	1–2	Feb 2019	Cleveland, USA	Challenger	Hard (i)	(United States) Maxime Cressy	7–6^{(7–4)}, 6–7^{(6–8)}, 3–6
Win	2–2	Jun 2019	Columbus, USA (2)	Challenger	Hard (i)	(South Korea) Nam Ji-sung	6–1, 7–5
Win	3–2	Feb 2020	Cleveland, USA	Challenger	Hard (i)	(Japan) Yosuke Watanuki	6–3, 1–6, 6–1

=== Doubles: 2 (1 title, 1 runner-up) ===
Legend ATP Challenger Tour (1–1)

Result	W–L	Date	Tournament	Tier	Surface	Partner	Opponents	Score
Win	1–0	Jan 2022	Columbus, USA	Challenger	Hard (i)	(United States) Tennys Sandgren	(Switzerland) Luca Margaroli (Japan) Yasutaka Uchiyama	5–7, 6–4, [10–5]
Loss	1–1	May 2022	Shymkent II, Kazakhstan	Challenger	Clay	(Japan) Kaichi Uchida	(Uzbekistan) Sanjar Fayziev (Greece) Markos Kalovelonis	7–6^{(7–3)}, 4–6, [4–10]

== ITF Futures finals ==
=== Singles: 4 (2 titles, 2 runner-ups) ===
Legend ITF Futures (2–2)	Finals by surface Hard (0–0) Clay (2–2) Grass (0–0) Carpet (0–0)

Result	W–L	Date	Tournament	Tier	Surface	Opponent	Score
Loss	0–1	Jul 2015	USA F20, Pittsburgh	Futures	Clay	(Ecuador) Emilio Gómez	4–6, 4–6
Loss	0–2	Aug 2016	Finland F1, Kaarina	Futures	Clay	(Norway) Casper Ruud	3–6, 6–4, 0–6
Win	1–2	Aug 2016	Finland F3, Helsinki	Futures	Clay	(Austria) Peter Goldsteiner	6–0, 7–5
Win	2–2	Jun 2017	USA F20, Rochester	Futures	Clay	(Canada) Samuel Monette	6–2, 6–4

=== Doubles: 7 (6 titles, 1 runner-up) ===
Legend ITF Futures (6–1)	Finals by surface Hard (0–0) Clay (6–1) Grass (0–0) Carpet (0–0)

Result	W–L	Date	Tournament	Tier	Surface	Partner	Opponents	Score
Loss	0–1	Aug 2015	Finland F1, Vierumäki	Futures	Clay	(Finland) Herkko Pöllänen	(Netherlands) Bobbie De Goeijen (Netherlands) Tallon Griekspoor	4–6, 6–7^{(2–7)}
Win	1–1	Aug 2015	Finland F2, Hyvinkää	Futures	Clay	(United Kingdom) Lloyd Glasspool	(Monaco) Romain Arneodo (France) Maxime Janvier	7–6^{(7–3)}, 6–2
Win	2–1	Aug 2015	Finland F3, Helsinki	Futures	Clay	(Finland) Herkko Pöllänen	(Germany) Demian Raab (Netherlands) Lennert van der Linden	6–3, 6–0
Win	3–1	Aug 2016	Finland F1, Kaarina	Futures	Clay	(Finland) Herkko Pöllänen	(New Zealand) Rubin Statham (United States) Thai-Son Kwiatkowski	6–7^{(4–7)}, 6–3, [10–6]
Win	4–1	Aug 2016	Finland F3, Helsinki	Futures	Clay	(Finland) Herkko Pöllänen	(Sweden) Daniel Appelgren (Sweden) Patrik Rosenholm	7–6^{(7–5)}, 6–3
Win	5–1	Jun 2017	USA F20, Rochester	Futures	Clay	(Canada) Hugo Di Feo	(United States) Luca Corinteli (United States) Thai-Son Kwiatkowski	7–6^{(7–5)}, 6–4
Win	6–1	Jul 2017	USA F22, Pittsburgh	Futures	Clay	(Canada) Hugo Di Feo	(United Kingdom) Farris Fathi Gosea (United States) Nathan Pasha	6–3, 6–4

== Davis Cup matches ==
Europe/Africa Zone Group II
Round	Date	Opponent	Final match score	Location	Surface	Match	Opponent	Rubber Score
1R	31 January – 2 February 2014	Cyprus	4–1	Copenhagen	Hard (indoor)	Singles 4	Sergis Kyratzis	6–0, 6–4 (W)
2R	4–6 April 2014	Luxembourg	5–0	Hillerød	Hard (indoor)	Singles 5	Christophe Tholl	6–2, 6–3 (W)
2R	15–17 July 2016	Finland	3–2	Kongens Lyngby	Hard (indoor)	Singles 1	Jarkko Nieminen	6–7^{(1–7)}, 5–7, 2–6 (L)
2R	15–17 July 2016	Finland	3–2	Kongens Lyngby	Hard (indoor)	Singles 5	Harri Heliövaara	4–6, 3–6, 7–6^{(7–2)}, 6–1, 7–5 (W)
Europe/Africa Zone Group I
Round	Date	Opponent	Final Match Score	Location	Surface	Match	Opponent	Rubber Score
1RP	18–20 September 2015	Spain	0–5	Odense	Hard (indoor)	Singles 1	Rafael Nadal	4–6, 3–6, 2–6 (L)
1RP	18–20 September 2015	Spain	0–5	Odense	Hard (indoor)	Singles 5	David Ferrer	1–6, 3–6 (L)

== See also ==
- List of Denmark Davis Cup team representatives
