= Robert Galloway (tennis) =

American tennis player (born 1992)

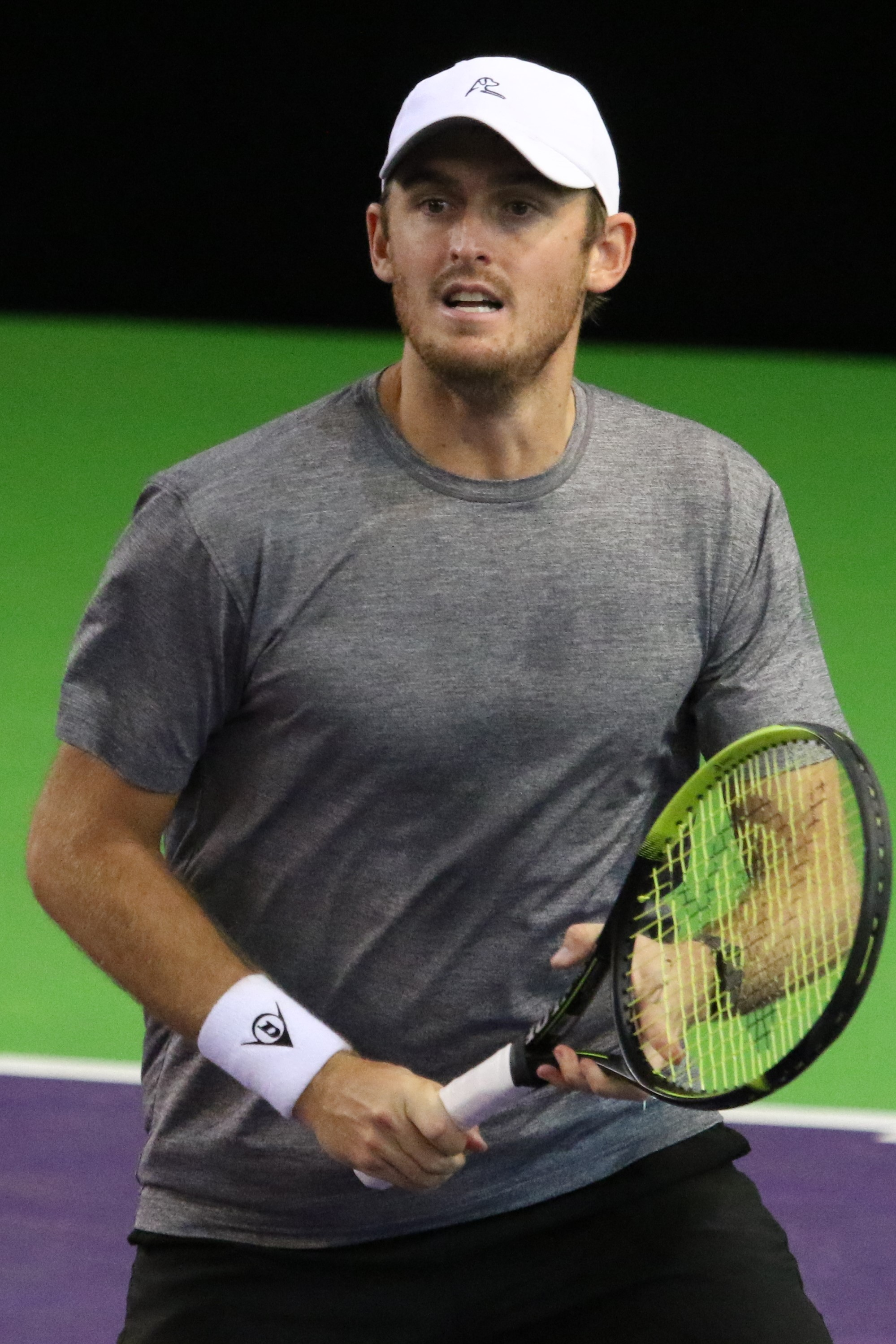
- Galloway at the 2021 Internationaux de Tennis de Vendée
- Country (sports): United States
- Residence: Greenville, South Carolina, U.S.
- Born: September 24, 1992 (age 34) Columbia, South Carolina, U.S.
- Height: 6 ft 2 in (1.88 m)
- Turned pro: 2015
- Plays: Right-handed (two-handed backhand)
- College: Wofford
- Coach: Brian Ward
- Prize money: US $1,308,346

Singles
- Career record: 0–0
- Career titles: 0
- Highest ranking: No. 1,037 (October 25, 2021)

Doubles
- Career record: 111–108
- Career titles: 4
- Highest ranking: No. 25 (February 10, 2025)
- Current ranking: No. 46 (August 31, 2026)

Grand Slam doubles results
- Australian Open: 3R (2025)
- French Open: 3R (2025)
- Wimbledon: 3R (2023, 2025)
- US Open: QF (2023)

Grand Slam mixed doubles results
- Australian Open: 1R (2025)
- French Open: 2R (2025)
- Wimbledon: 2R (2025)
- US Open: 1R (2022, 2024)
- Last updated on: September 1, 2026.

Robert Galloway (born September 24, 1992) is an American professional tennis player who specializes in doubles. He has a career-high ATP doubles ranking of world No. 25 achieved on February 10, 2025. He has won three ATP Tour doubles titles, two of them with Julian Cash.

His most notable result is a major quarterfinal at the 2023 US Open.

== Professional career ==
=== 2023: Grand Slam quarterfinal, Top 50 ===
Playing alongside French Albano Olivetti, Galloway reached the men's doubles quarterfinal at the US Open. As a result, he reached one spot shy of the top 50 in the rankings on 11 September 2023. A month later, he reached the top 50 at world No. 47 on 16 October 2023.

=== 2024-2025: New partnership with Cash, Maiden ATP title, top 25 ===
Ranked No. 46, Galloway reached his first ATP Tour final with new partner Julian Cash at the 2024 Delray Beach Open. The American won his maiden ATP title defeating defending champion Santiago Gonzalez and his partner Neal Skupski.

Galloway reached his second final in his career and for the season with Cash, at the 2024 BOSS Open but they were defeated by Brazilians Marcelo Melo and Rafael Matos. He won his second title at the 2024 Mallorca Championships with Cash, defeating Diego Hidalgo and Alejandro Tabilo in the final in straight sets. As a result, Galloway reached the top 35 on 1 July 2024.

He reached his fourth final of the season with Cash, at the 2024 Winston-Salem Open, defeating John Peers and Jamie Murray.

Partnering with Ariel Behar, Galloway was a runner-up at the Japan Open, losing to British duo including former partner Julian Cash and Lloyd Glasspool, in the final.

== ATP Tour finals ==
=== Doubles: 14 (4 titles, 10 runner-ups) ===
Legend Grand Slam (–) ATP 1000 (–) ATP 500 (0–3) ATP 250 (3–7)	Finals by surface Hard (2–7) Clay (0–1) Grass (1–2)	Finals by setting Outdoor (2–8) Indoor (1–2)

Result	W–L	Date	Tournament	Tier	Surface	Partner	Opponents	Score
Win	1–0	Feb 2024	Delray Beach Open, US	ATP 250	Hard	(United Kingdom) Julian Cash	(Mexico) Santiago González (United Kingdom) Neal Skupski	5–7, 7–5, [10–2]
Loss	1–1	Jun 2024	Stuttgart Open, Germany	ATP 250	Grass	(United Kingdom) Julian Cash	(Brazil) Rafael Matos (Brazil) Marcelo Melo	6–3, 3–6, [8–10]
Win	2–1	Jun 2024	Mallorca Championships, Spain	ATP 250	Grass	(United Kingdom) Julian Cash	(Ecuador) Diego Hidalgo (Chile) Alejandro Tabilo	6-4, 6-4
Loss	2–2	Aug 2024	Winston-Salem Open, US	ATP 250	Hard	(United Kingdom) Julian Cash	(United States) Nathaniel Lammons (United States) Jackson Withrow	4–6, 3–6
Loss	2–3	Oct 2024	Japan Open, Japan	ATP 500	Hard	(Uruguay) Ariel Behar	(United Kingdom) Julian Cash (United Kingdom) Lloyd Glasspool	4–6, 6–4, [10–12]
Loss	2–4	Oct 2024	European Open, Belgium	ATP 250	Hard (i)	(Kazakhstan) Aleksandr Nedovyesov	(Austria) Alexander Erler (Austria) Lucas Miedler	4–6, 6–1, [8–10]
Loss	2–5	Feb 2025	Dallas Open, US	ATP 500	Hard (i)	(Uruguay) Ariel Behar	(United States) Christian Harrison (United States) Evan King	6–7^{(4–7)}, 6–7^{(4–7)}
Loss	2–6	Jun 2025	Mallorca Championships, Spain	ATP 250	Grass	(India) Yuki Bhambri	(Mexico) Santiago González (United States) Austin Krajicek	1–6, 6–1, [13–15]
Win	3–6	Oct 2025	Stockholm Open, Sweden	ATP 250	Hard (i)	(Austria) Alexander Erler	(United States) Vasil Kirkov (Netherlands) Bart Stevens	6–3, 6–2
Loss	3–7	Jan 2026	Auckland Open, New Zealand	ATP 250	Hard	(Austria) Alexander Erler	(France) Théo Arribagé (France) Albano Olivetti	6–7^{(2–7)}, 4–6
Loss	3–8	Feb 2026	Mexican Open, Mexico	ATP 500	Hard	(Austria) Alexander Erler	(Brazil) Marcelo Melo (Germany) Alexander Zverev	3–6, 4–6
Loss	3–9	Jul 2026	Swiss Open Gstaad, Switzerland	ATP 250	Clay	(Brazil) Marcelo Demoliner	(Austria) Lucas Miedler (Australia) Marc Polmans	4–6, 3–6
Loss	3–10	Sep 2026	Chengdu Open, China	ATP 250	Hard	(Sweden) André Göransson	(United Kingdom) Luke Johnson (Poland) Jan Zieliński	5–7, 6–7^{(7–9)}
Win	4–10	Oct 2026	European Open, Belgium	ATP 250	Hard (i)	(Germany) Constantin Frantzen	(France) Sadio Doumbia (Netherlands) Bart Stevens	6–7^{(4–7)}, 6–4, [10–8]

== ATP Challenger and ITF Tour finals ==
=== Doubles: 52 (32 titles, 20 runner-ups) ===
Legend ATP Challenger Tour (20–15) ITF Futures (12–5)	Finals by surface Hard (26–13) Clay (5–6) Grass (1–1)

Result	W–L	Date	Tournament	Tier	Surface	Partner	Opponents	Score
Win	1–0	Sep 2015	Turkey F38, Antalya	Futures	Hard	(United States) Robbie Mudge	(Russia) Kirill Dmitriev (Russia) Andrei Plotniy	1–6, 6–4, [10–5]
Win	2–0	Oct 2015	Turkey F39, Antalya	Futures	Hard	(United States) Robbie Mudge	(Brazil) Daniel Dutra da Silva (Brazil) Eduardo Russi	6–4, 3–6, [10–5]
Loss	2–1	Jul 2016	USA F22, Pittsburgh	Futures	Clay	(United States) Robbie Mudge	(United States) Connor Smith (United States) Danny Thomas	6–3, 4–6, [6–10]
Win	3–1	Aug 2016	Spain F25, Ourense	Futures	Hard	(United States) Dennis Uspensky	(Japan) Ryota Kishi (Japan) Yusuke Watanuki	6–4, 6–1
Win	4–1	Nov 2016	USA F37, Pensacola, Florida	Futures	Clay	(United States) Dominic Cotrone	(Brazil) Pedro Dumont (France) Alexandre Peyrot	7–5, 6–3
Win	5–1	Dec 2016	USA F40, Tallahassee, Florida	Futures	Hard (i)	(United States) Nathaniel Lammons	(Tunisia) Aziz Dougaz (Burundi) Guy Orly Iradukunda	6–4, 5–7, [10–8]
Loss	5–2	Apr 2017	Greece F5, Heraklion	Futures	Hard	(United States) Nick Chappell	(France) Benjamin Bonzi (France) Rémi Boutillier	3–6, 7–6^{(10–8)}, [6–10]
Win	6–2	Jun 2017	Spain F17, Martos	Futures	Hard	(United States) Evan King	(United States) JC Aragone (Australia) Daniel Nolan	6–4, 6–4
Loss	6–3	Aug 2017	USA F27, Edwardsville, Illinois	Futures	Hard	(United States) Alex Lawson	(United States) Hunter Callahan (Sweden) Gustav Hansson	3–6, 4–6
Win	7–3	Nov 2017	Kuwait F1, Mishref	Futures	Hard	(Zimbabwe) Benjamin Lock	(India) Chandril Sood (India) Lakshit Sood	7–6^{(8–6)}, 7–5
Win	8–3	Nov 2017	Kuwait F2, Mishref	Futures	Hard	(Zimbabwe) Benjamin Lock	(France) Baptiste Crepatte (France) Lény Mitjana	6–3, 6–2
Win	9–3	Nov 2017	Kuwait F3, Mishref	Futures	Hard	(Zimbabwe) Benjamin Lock	(Netherlands) Marc Dijkhuizen (Serbia) Darko Jandrić	6–2, 6–1
Win	10–3	Nov 2017	South Africa F1, Stellenbosch	Futures	Hard	(Zimbabwe) Benjamin Lock	(Germany) Peter Heller (Germany) George von Massow	5–7, 6–2, [10–5]
Win	11–3	Dec 2017	South Africa F2, Stellenbosch	Futures	Hard	(Zimbabwe) Benjamin Lock	(Netherlands) Michiel de Krom (Netherlands) Ryan Nijboer	6–3, 6–3
Win	12–3	Dec 2017	South Africa F3, Stellenbosch	Futures	Hard	(Zimbabwe) Benjamin Lock	(Spain) Jaime Pulgar-García (Spain) Javier Pulgar-García	7–6^{(7–3)}, 6–7^{(4–7)}, [10–5]
Loss	12–4	Mar 2018	Egypt F8, Sharm El Sheikh	Futures	Hard	(Zimbabwe) Benjamin Lock	(Guatemala) Christopher Díaz Figueroa (Guatemala) Wilfredo González	4–6, 6–4, [10–12]
Loss	12–5	Mar 2018	Bahrain F1, Manama	Futures	Hard	(United States) Anderson Reed	(Czech Republic) Marek Gengel (Czech Republic) Dominik Kellovský	3–6, 6–3, [6–10]
Win	13–5	Apr 2018	Tallahassee, USA	Challenger	Clay	(United States) Denis Kudla	(Spain) Enrique López Pérez (India) Jeevan Nedunchezhiyan	6–3, 6–1
Win	14–5	Jul 2018	Gatineau, Canada	Challenger	Hard	(United States) Bradley Klahn	(Barbados) Darian King (Canada) Peter Polansky	7–6^{(7–4)}, 4–6, [10–8]
Win	15–5	Aug 2018	Lexington, USA	Challenger	Hard	(Venezuela) Roberto Maytín	(Belgium) Joris De Loore (Australia) Marc Polmans	6–3, 6–1
Win	16–5	Oct 2018	Calgary, Canada	Challenger	Hard (i)	(United States) Nathan Pasha	(Australia) Matt Reid (Australia) John-Patrick Smith	6–4, 4–6, [10–6]
Loss	16–6	Oct 2018	Las Vegas, USA	Challenger	Hard	(United States) Nathan Pasha	(El Salvador) Marcelo Arévalo (Venezuela) Roberto Maytín	3–6, 3–6
Loss	16–7	Jan 2019	Columbus, USA	Challenger	Hard (i)	(United States) Nathaniel Lammons	(United States) Maxime Cressy (Portugal) Bernardo Saraiva	5–7, 6–7^{(3–7)}
Win	17–7	Jan 2019	Newport Beach, USA	Challenger	Hard	(United States) Nathaniel Lammons	(Monaco) Romain Arneodo (Belarus) Andrei Vasilevski	7–5, 7–6^{(7–1)}
Loss	17–8	Feb 2019	Cleveland, USA	Challenger	Hard	(United States) Nathaniel Lammons	(Monaco) Romain Arneodo (Belarus) Andrei Vasilevski	4–6, 6–7^{(4–7)}
Win	18–8	Feb 2019	Cherbourg, France	Challenger	Hard (i)	(United States) Nathaniel Lammons	(Italy) Raúl Brancaccio (Spain) Javier Barranco Cosano	4–6, 7–6^{(7–4)}, [10–8]
Win	19–8	Sep 2019	New Haven, USA	Challenger	Hard	(United States) Nathaniel Lammons	(Belgium) Sander Gillé (Belgium) Joran Vliegen	7–5, 6–4
Win	20–8	Sep 2019	Tiburon, USA	Challenger	Hard	(Venezuela) Roberto Maytín	(Barbados) Darian King (United States) JC Aragone	6–2, 7–5
Win	21–8	Jan 2020	Ann Arbor, USA	Challenger	Hard	(Mexico) Hans Hach Verdugo	(Colombia) Nicolás Barrientos (Colombia) Alejandro Gómez	4–6, 6–4, [10–8]
Loss	21-9	Sep 2020	Sibiu, Romania	Challenger	Clay	(Mexico) Hans Hach Verdugo	(Poland) Jan Zieliński (United States) Hunter Reese	4–6, 2–6
Loss	21-10	Oct 2020	Istanbul, Turkey	Challenger	Hard	(United States) Nathaniel Lammons	(Uruguay) Ariel Behar (Ecuador) Gonzalo Escobar	6–4, 3–6, [7–10]
Loss	21-11	Feb 2021	Antalya, Turkey	Challenger	Clay	(United States) Alex Lawson	(Ukraine) Denys Molchanov (Kazakhstan) Aleksandr Nedovyesov	4–6, 6–7^{(2–7)}
Win	22–11	Mar 2021	Cleveland, USA	Challenger	Hard (i)	(United States) Alex Lawson	(United States) Evan King (United States) Hunter Reese	7–5, 6–7^{(5–7)}, [11–9]
Loss	22-12	June 2021	Aix-en-Provence, France	Challenger	Clay	(United States) Alex Lawson	(France) Sadio Doumbia (France) Fabien Reboul	7–6^{(7–4)}, 5–7, [4–10]
Loss	22-13	Jul 2021	Salzburg, Austria	Challenger	Clay	(United States) Alex Lawson	(Argentina) Facundo Bagnis (Peru) Sergio Galdós	0–6, 3–6
Win	23–13	Jul 2021	Segovia, Spain	Challenger	Hard	(United States) Alex Lawson	(United States) JC Aragone (Colombia) Nicolás Barrientos	7–6^{(10–8)}, 6–4
Loss	23–14	Feb 2022	Cleveland, USA	Challenger	Hard (i)	(United States) Jackson Withrow	(United States) William Blumberg (United States) Max Schnur	3–6, 6–7^{(4–7)}
Loss	23–15	Mar 2022	Monterrey, Mexico	Challenger	Hard	(Australia) John-Patrick Smith	(Mexico) Hans Hach Verdugo (United States) Austin Krajicek	0–6, 3–6
Win	24–15	Apr 2022	Sarasota, USA	Challenger	Clay	(United States) Jackson Withrow	(Sweden) André Göransson (United States) Nathaniel Lammons	6–3, 7–6^{(7–3)}
Loss	24–16	May 2022	Little Rock, USA	Challenger	Hard	(United States) Max Schnur	(Australia) Andrew Harris (United States) Christian Harrison	3–6, 4–6
Loss	24–17	Jun 2022	Oeiras, Portugal	Challenger	Clay	(United States) Alex Lawson	(France) Sadio Doumbia (France) Fabien Reboul	3–6, 6–3, [13–15]
Win	25–17	Nov 2022	Champaign, USA	Challenger	Hard (i)	(Mexico) Hans Hach Verdugo	(United States) Ezekiel Clark (United States) Alfredo Perez	3–6, 6–3, [10–5]
Loss	25–18	Jan 2023	Nonthaburi, Thailand	Challenger	Hard	(Mexico) Hans Hach Verdugo	(Czech Republic) Marek Gengel (Czech Republic) Adam Pavlásek	6–7^{(4–7)}, 4–6
Win	26–18	Feb 2023	Cleveland, USA	Challenger	Hard (i)	(Mexico) Hans Hach Verdugo	(Philippines) Ruben Gonzales (United States) Reese Stalder	3–6, 7–5, [10–6]
Win	27–18	Mar 2023	Puerto Vallarta, Mexico	Challenger	Hard	(Mexico) Miguel Ángel Reyes-Varela	(Sweden) André Göransson (Japan) Ben McLachlan	3–0 ret.
Win	28–18	Apr 2023	Ostrava, Czech Republic	Challenger	Clay	(Mexico) Miguel Ángel Reyes-Varela	(Argentina) Guido Andreozzi (Argentina) Guillermo Durán	7–5, 7–6^{(7–5)}
Loss	28–19	Jun 2023	Ilkley, United Kingdom	Challenger	Grass	(Australia) John-Patrick Smith	(Ecuador) Gonzalo Escobar (Kazakhstan) Aleksandr Nedovyesov	6–2, 5–7, [9–11]
Win	29–19	Oct 2023	Mouilleron-le-Captif, France	Challenger	Hard (i)	(United Kingdom) Julian Cash	(United States) Maxime Cressy (Finland) Otto Virtanen	6–4, 5–7, [12–10]
Win	30–19	Oct 2023	Málaga, Spain	Challenger	Hard	(United Kingdom) Julian Cash	(Australia) Andrew Harris (Australia) John-Patrick Smith	7–5, 6–2
Loss	30–20	Oct 2023	Brest, France	Challenger	Hard (i)	(France) Albano Olivetti	(India) Yuki Bhambri (United Kingdom) Julian Cash	7–6^{(7–5)}, 3–6, [5–10]
Win	31–20	May 2024	Bordeaux, France	Challenger	Clay	(United Kingdom) Julian Cash	(France) Quentin Halys (France) Nicolas Mahut	6–3, 7–6^{(7–2)}
Win	32–20	Jun 2024	Surbiton, United Kingdom	Challenger	Grass	(United Kingdom) Julian Cash	(Colombia) Nicolas Barrientos (Ecuador) Diego Hidalgo	6–4, 6–4
