= Michael Redlicki =

American tennis player

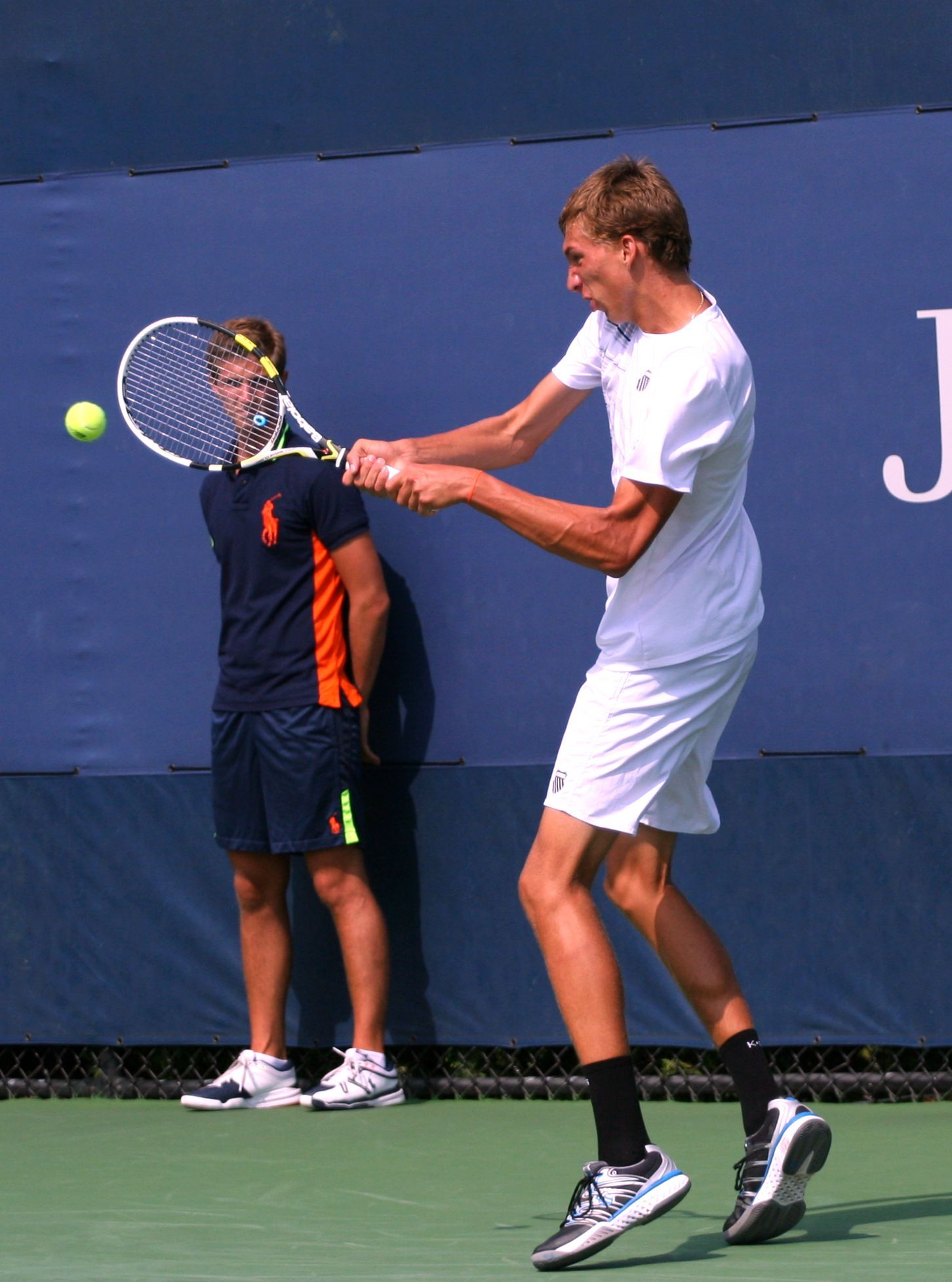
- Country (sports): United States
- Born: 16 November 1993 (age 31) Chicago, United States
- Height: 2.03 m (6 ft 8 in)
- Plays: Left-handed (two-handed backhand)
- Prize money: $69,353

Singles
- Career record: 0–0 (at ATP Tour level, Grand Slam level, and in Davis Cup)
- Career titles: 0
- Highest ranking: No. 313 (18 November 2019)
- Current ranking: No. 394 (4 October 2021)

Doubles
- Career record: 1–1 (at ATP Tour level, Grand Slam level, and in Davis Cup)
- Career titles: 0
- Highest ranking: No. 470 (8 July 2013)
- Current ranking: No. 1309 (4 October 2021)
- Last updated on: 5 October 2021.

Michael Redlicki (born 16 November 1993) is an American tennis player.

Redlicki has a career high ATP singles ranking of 351 achieved on 7 January 2018. His career high ATP doubles ranking of 470 was achieved on 8 July 2013.

Redlicki made his Grand Slam main draw debut at the 2012 US Open in the doubles draw partnering Dennis Novikov.

Redlicki played college tennis at Duke University before transferring and playing at the University of Arkansas. Redlicki is also the older brother of fellow tennis player Martin.

== Challenger and Futures Finals ==
=== Singles: 3 (1–2) ===
Legend (singles) ATP Challenger Tour (0–0) ITF Futures Tour (1–2)	Titles by surface Hard (1–2) Clay (0–0) Grass (0–0) Carpet (0–0)

Result	W–L	Date	Tournament	Tier	Surface	Opponent	Score
Loss	0–1	Mar 2018	Canada F2, Sherbrooke	Futures	Hard	(Germany) Dominik Koepfer	7–6^{(7–3)}, 5–7, 2–6
Loss	0–2	Jun 2018	USA F13, Winston-Salem	Futures	Hard	(Cyprus) Petros Chrysochos	2–6, 6–1, 4–6
Win	1–2	Jun 2018	USA F15, Winston-Salem	Futures	Hard	(United States) Tommy Paul	6–3, 3–6, 6–1
