= Cleveland Open (tennis) =

Tennis tournament in Ohio, US

- 2025 Cleveland Open

ATP Challenger Tour
- Event name: Cleveland Open
- Location: Cleveland, United States
- Venue: Cleveland Racquet Club
- Category: ATP Challenger 75
- Surface: Hard (indoor)
- Draw: 32S/24Q/16D
- Prize money: $100,000
- Website: website

Current champions (2025)
- Singles: (United States) Colton Smith
- Doubles: (United States) Robert Cash (United States) JJ Tracy

The Cleveland Open is a professional tennis tournament played on indoor hardcourts. It is currently part of the ATP Challenger Tour. It is held annually in Cleveland, United States, since 2019.

== Past finals ==
=== Singles ===
Year	Champion	Runner-up	Score
2019	(United States) Maxime Cressy	(Denmark) Mikael Torpegaard	6–7^{(4–7)}, 7–6^{(8–6)}, 6–3
2020	(Denmark) Mikael Torpegaard	(Japan) Yosuke Watanuki	6–3, 1–6, 6–1
2021	(United States) Bjorn Fratangelo	(United States) Jenson Brooksby	7–5, 6–4
2022	(Switzerland) Dominic Stricker	(Japan) Yoshihito Nishioka	7–5, 6–1
2023	(United States) Aleksandar Kovacevic	(China) Wu Yibing	3–6, 7–5, 7–6^{(7–2)}
2024	(United States) Patrick Kypson	(United States) Ethan Quinn	4–6, 6–3, 6–2
2025	(United States) Colton Smith	(United States) Eliot Spizzirri	6–4, 6–7^{(6–8)}, 6–3
2026	(United States) Colton Smith	(Croatia) Borna Gojo	6–4, 7–5

=== Doubles ===
Year	Champions	Runners-up	Score
2019	(Monaco) Romain Arneodo (Belarus) Andrei Vasilevski	(United States) Robert Galloway (United States) Nathaniel Lammons	6–4, 7–6^{(7–4)}
2020	(Philippines) Treat Huey (United States) Nathaniel Lammons	(Australia) Luke Saville (Australia) John-Patrick Smith	7–5, 6–2
2021	(United States) Robert Galloway (United States) Alex Lawson	(United States) Evan King (United States) Hunter Reese	7–5, 6–7^{(5–7)}, [11–9]
2022	(United States) William Blumberg (United States) Max Schnur	(United States) Robert Galloway (United States) Jackson Withrow	6–3, 7–6^{(7–4)}
2023	(United States) Robert Galloway (Mexico) Hans Hach Verdugo	(Philippines) Ruben Gonzales (United States) Reese Stalder	3–6, 7–5, [10–6]
2024	(United States) George Goldhoff (Japan) James Trotter	(United States) William Blumberg (United States) Alex Lawson	6–7^{(0–7)}, 6–3, [10–8]
2025	(United States) Robert Cash (United States) JJ Tracy	(Canada) Juan Carlos Aguilar (Poland) Filip Pieczonka	7–6^{(7–4)}, 6–1
2026	(United States) Cannon Kingsley (Antigua and Barbuda) Jody Maginley	(United States) George Goldhoff (Australia) Calum Puttergill	6–3, 6–4

== See also ==
- Tennis in the Land
