= 2022 Open Sud de France =

- Date: 31 January – 6 February 2022
- Edition: 35th
- Draw: 28S / 16D
- Surface: Hard (indoor)
- Location: Montpellier, France
- Venue: Sud de France Arena

Champions

Singles
- (Kazakhstan) Alexander Bublik

Doubles
- (France) Pierre-Hugues Herbert / (France) Nicolas Mahut
← 2021 ·	Open Sud de France	· 2023 →

The 2022 Open Sud de France was a tennis tournament played on indoor hard courts. It was the 35th edition of the event, and part of the ATP Tour 250 series of the 2022 ATP Tour. It took place at the Arena Montpellier in Montpellier, France, from 31 January until 6 February 2022. Sixth-seeded Alexander Bublik won the singles title.

== Champions ==
=== Singles ===
- (Kazakhstan) Alexander Bublik def. (Germany) Alexander Zverev, 6–4, 6–3

This was Bublik's maiden ATP Tour singles title.

=== Doubles ===
- (France) Pierre-Hugues Herbert / (France) Nicolas Mahut def. (United Kingdom) Lloyd Glasspool / (Finland) Harri Heliövaara, 4–6, 7–6^{(7–3)}, [12–10].

== Point and prize money ==
=== Point distribution ===
Event	W	F	SF	QF	Round of 16	Round of 32	Q	Q2	Q1
Singles	250	150	90	45	20	0	12	6	0
Doubles	250	150	90	45	0	—	—	—	—

=== Prize money ===
Event	W	F	SF	QF	Round of 16	Round of 32	Q2	Q1
Singles	€45,865	€32,110	€21,265	€14,180	€9,170	€5,005	€2,050	€1,130
Doubles*	€16,260	€11,670	€7,510	€5,000	€2,920	—	—	—

_{*per team}

== Singles main-draw entrants ==
=== Seeds ===
Country	Player	Rank^{1}	Seed
GER	Alexander Zverev	3	1
ESP	Roberto Bautista Agut	18	2
FRA	Gaël Monfils	20	3
GEO	Nikoloz Basilashvili	23	4
SRB	Filip Krajinović	36	5
KAZ	Alexander Bublik	37	6
FRA	Ugo Humbert	40	7
BEL	David Goffin	45	8

- ^{1} Rankings are as of 17 January 2022.

=== Other entrants ===
The following players received wildcards into the singles main draw :

- (Belgium) David Goffin
- (France) Lucas Pouille
- (Germany) Alexander Zverev

The following player received entry using a protected ranking into the singles main draw:

- (France) Jo-Wilfried Tsonga

The following players received entry from the qualifying draw:

- (Bosnia and Herzegovina) Damir Džumhur
- (France) Pierre-Hugues Herbert
- (France) Gilles Simon
- (Poland) Kacper Żuk

=== Withdrawals ===
Before the tournament

- (Canada) Félix Auger-Aliassime → replaced by (France) Corentin Moutet
- (Croatia) Borna Ćorić → replaced by (France) Adrian Mannarino
- (France) Arthur Rinderknech → replaced by (Germany) Peter Gojowczyk
- (Netherlands) Botic van de Zandschulp → replaced by (Sweden) Mikael Ymer

=== Retirements ===
- (France) Gilles Simon

== Doubles main-draw entrants ==
=== Seeds ===
Country	Player	Country	Player	Rank^{1}	Seed
FRA	Pierre-Hugues Herbert	FRA	Nicolas Mahut	13	1
NED	Matwé Middelkoop	AUT	Philipp Oswald	81	2
ISR	Jonathan Erlich	FRA	Édouard Roger-Vasselin	108	3
KAZ	Aleksandr Nedovyesov	PAK	Aisam-ul-Haq Qureshi	112	4

- ^{1} Rankings are as of 17 January 2022.

=== Other entrants ===
The following pairs received wildcards into the doubles main draw:

- (France) Robin Bertrand / (France) Antoine Hoang
- (France) Sascha Gueymard Wayenburg / (France) Luca Van Assche

The following pair received entry using a protected ranking into the doubles main draw:

- (France) Fabrice Martin / (France) Jo-Wilfried Tsonga

=== Withdrawals ===
Before the tournament

- (Croatia) Ivan Dodig / (Brazil) Marcelo Melo → replaced by (Brazil) Marcelo Melo / (Germany) Alexander Zverev
- (Netherlands) Tallon Griekspoor / (Netherlands) Botic van de Zandschulp → replaced by (Ukraine) Denys Molchanov / (Spain) David Vega Hernández
- (Belarus) Ilya Ivashka / (Belarus) Andrei Vasilevski → replaced by (France) Albano Olivetti / (France) Lucas Pouille
- (United Kingdom) Jonny O'Mara / (United Kingdom) Ken Skupski → replaced by (United Kingdom) Jonny O'Mara / (United States) Hunter Reese
