= 2019 Columbus Challenger =

- Date: 7–13 January
- Edition: 6th
- Draw: 48S / 16D
- Surface: Hard / Indoors
- Location: Columbus, United States

Champions

Singles
- (United States) J. J. Wolf

Doubles
- (United States) Maxime Cressy / (Portugal) Bernardo Saraiva
← 2018 ·	Columbus Challenger	· 2019 →

The 2019 Columbus Challenger was a professional tennis tournament played on indoor hard courts. It was the sixth edition of the tournament which was part of the 2019 ATP Challenger Tour. It took place in Columbus, United States between 7 and 13 January 2019.

== Singles main draw entrants ==
=== Seeds ===
Country	Player	Rank^{1}	Seed
NED	Thiemo de Bakker	242	1
CAN	Filip Peliwo	243	2
SVK	Norbert Gombos	247	3
BLR	Uladzimir Ignatik	250	4
COL	Santiago Giraldo	253	5
USA	Dennis Novikov	257	6
FRA	Benjamin Bonzi	261	7
USA	Kevin King	262	8
POR	Gastão Elias	263	9
CRO	Nino Serdarušić	264	10
FRA	Mathias Bourgue	265	11
ESP	Bernabé Zapata Miralles	266	12
DOM	José Hernández-Fernández	267	13
FRA	Johan Tatlot	269	14
ITA	Gianluca Mager	270	15
ESP	Mario Vilella Martínez	271	16

- ^{1} Rankings are as of December 31, 2018.

=== Other entrants ===
The following players received entry into the singles main draw as wildcards:

- (United States) Martin Joyce
- (United States) John McNally
- (United States) Kyle Seelig
- (Denmark) Mikael Torpegaard
- (United States) J. J. Wolf

The following players received entry into the singles main draw using their ITF World Tennis Ranking:

- (France) Tom Jomby
- (France) Fabien Reboul
- (Netherlands) Jelle Sels
- (Brazil) João Souza

The following players received entry from the qualifying draw:

- (Netherlands) Gijs Brouwer
- (Brazil) João Menezes

== Champions ==
=== Singles ===
- (United States) J. J. Wolf def. (Denmark) Mikael Torpegaard 6–7^{(4–7)}, 6–3, 6–4.

=== Doubles ===
- (United States) Maxime Cressy / (Portugal) Bernardo Saraiva def. (United States) Robert Galloway / (United States) Nathaniel Lammons 7–5, 7–6^{(7–3)}.
