= 2022 Open Sud de France – Doubles =

Doubles
- 2022 Open Sud de France

Final
- Champions: (France) Pierre-Hugues Herbert (France) Nicolas Mahut
- Runners-up: (United Kingdom) Lloyd Glasspool (Finland) Harri Heliövaara
- Score: 4–6, 7–6^{(7–3)}, [12–10]

Details
- Draw: 16
- Seeds: 4

Events
| Singles | Doubles |
| ← 2021 · | Open Sud de France | · 2023 → |

Pierre-Hugues Herbert and Nicolas Mahut defeated Lloyd Glasspool and Harri Heliövaara in the final, 4–6, 7–6^{(7–3)}, [12–10] to win the doubles tennis title at the 2022 Open Sud de France. They saved a championship point en route to their 21st career ATP Tour doubles title together. Glasspool and Heliövaara were contesting for their second title as a team.

Henri Kontinen and Édouard Roger-Vasselin were the defending champions, but only Roger-Vasselin returned and partnered with Jonathan Erlich for his title defense. The pair lost in the semifinals to Herbert and Mahut.

== Seeds ==
1. (France) Pierre-Hugues Herbert / (France) Nicolas Mahut (champions)
2. (Netherlands) Matwé Middelkoop / (Austria) Philipp Oswald (first round)
3. (Israel) Jonathan Erlich / (France) Édouard Roger-Vasselin (semifinals)
4. (Kazakhstan) Aleksandr Nedovyesov / (Pakistan) Aisam-ul-Haq Qureshi (quarterfinals)

== Draw ==
=== Key ===
- Q = Qualifier
- WC = Wild card
- LL = Lucky loser
- Alt = Alternate
- SE = Special exempt
- PR = Protected ranking
- ITF = ITF entry
- JE = Junior exempt
- w/o = Walkover
- r = Retired
- d = Defaulted
- SR = Special ranking

=== Draw ===
First round
1 | (France) P-H Herbert (France) N Mahut | 6 | 6
(Georgia (country)) N Basilashvili (Germany) D Brown | 2 | 2
(Ukraine) D Molchanov (Spain) D Vega Hernández | 7^{7} | 5 | [7]
WC | (France) S Gueymard Wayenburg (France) L Van Assche | 6^{1} | 7 | [10]
3 | (Israel) J Erlich (France) É Roger-Vasselin | 6 | 6
(Brazil) M Melo (Germany) A Zverev | 3 | 4
PR | (France) F Martin (France) J-W Tsonga | 6 | 6
Alt | (France) A Olivetti (France) L Pouille | 3 | 4
(United Kingdom) L Glasspool (Finland) H Heliövaara | 6 | 6
(France) B Bonzi (Monaco) H Nys | 1 | 4
(Kazakhstan) A Bublik (United States) M McDonald | 3 | 6 | [6]
4 | (Kazakhstan) A Nedovyesov (Pakistan) A-u-H Qureshi | 6 | 3 | [10]
(Czech Republic) R Jebavý (Slovakia) A Molčan | 6 | 6
WC | (France) R Bertrand (France) A Hoang | 2 | 2
(United Kingdom) J O'Mara (United States) H Reese | 6 | 6
2 | (Netherlands) M Middelkoop (Austria) P Oswald | 3 | 4

Quarterfinals
1 | (France) P-H Herbert (France) N Mahut | 6 | 6
WC | (France) S Gueymard Wayenburg (France) L Van Assche | 3 | 3
3 | (Israel) J Erlich (France) É Roger-Vasselin | 6 | 6
PR | (France) F Martin (France) J-W Tsonga | 3 | 2
(United Kingdom) L Glasspool (Finland) H Heliövaara | 6 | 6
4 | (Kazakhstan) A Nedovyesov (Pakistan) A-u-H Qureshi | 4 | 4
(Czech Republic) R Jebavý (Slovakia) A Molčan | 1 | 6 | [5]
(United Kingdom) J O'Mara (United States) H Reese | 6 | 4 | [10]

Semifinals
1 | (France) P-H Herbert (France) N Mahut | 5 | 7 | [10]
3 | (Israel) J Erlich (France) É Roger-Vasselin | 7 | 5 | [8]
(United Kingdom) L Glasspool (Finland) H Heliövaara | 6 | 6
(United Kingdom) J O'Mara (United States) H Reese | 3 | 4

Final
1 | (France) P-H Herbert (France) N Mahut | 4 | 7^{7} | [12]
(United Kingdom) L Glasspool (Finland) H Heliövaara | 6 | 6^{3} | [10]
