= 2023 Open Sud de France =

- Date: 6–12 February 2023
- Edition: 36th
- Draw: 28S / 16D
- Prize money: €630,705
- Surface: Hard (Indoor)
- Location: Montpellier, France
- Venue: Sud de France Arena

Champions

Singles
- (Italy) Jannik Sinner

Doubles
- (Netherlands) Robin Haase / (Netherlands) Matwé Middelkoop
← 2022 ·	Open Sud de France	· 2024 →

The 2023 Open Sud de France was a men's tennis tournament played on indoor hard courts. It was the 36th edition of the Open Sud de France, and part of the ATP Tour 250 series of the 2023 ATP Tour. It took place at the Arena Montpellier in Montpellier, France, from 6 February until 12 February 2023. Second-seeded Jannik Sinner won the singles title.

== Finals ==
=== Singles ===
- (Italy) Jannik Sinner def. (United States) Maxime Cressy, 7–6^{(7–3)}, 6–3

=== Doubles ===
- (Netherlands) Robin Haase / (Netherlands) Matwé Middelkoop def. (United States) Maxime Cressy / (France) Albano Olivetti, 7–6^{(7–4)}, 4–6, [10–6]

== Point and prize money ==
=== Point distribution ===
Event	W	F	SF	QF	Round of 16	Round of 32	Q	Q2	Q1
Singles	250	150	90	45	20	0	12	6	0
Doubles	250	150	90	45	0	—	—	—	—

=== Prize money ===
Event	W	F	SF	QF	Round of 16	Round of 32	Q2	Q1
Singles	€85,605	€49,940	€29,355	€17,010	€9,880	€6,035	€3,020	€1,645
Doubles*	€29,740	€15,910	€9,330	€5,220	€3,070	—	—	—
Doubles prize money per team

== Singles main draw entrants ==
=== Seeds ===
Country	Player	Rank^{1}	Seed
DEN	Holger Rune	9	1
ITA	Jannik Sinner	17	2
CRO	Borna Ćorić	23	3
ESP	Roberto Bautista Agut	24	4
ESP	Alejandro Davidovich Fokina	32	5
KAZ	Alexander Bublik	36	6
FIN	Emil Ruusuvuori	43	7
FRA	Benjamin Bonzi	45	8

- ^{1} Rankings are as of 30 January 2022.

=== Other entrants ===
The following players received wildcards into the singles main draw :

- (France) Arthur Fils
- (France) Ugo Humbert
- (France) Luca Van Assche

The following players received entry from the qualifying draw:

- (Switzerland) Antoine Bellier
- (France) Geoffrey Blancaneaux
- (France) Clément Chidekh
- (Italy) Luca Nardi

=== Withdrawals ===
- (Spain) Pablo Carreño Busta → replaced by (France) Grégoire Barrère
- (Bulgaria) Grigor Dimitrov → replaced by (Sweden) Mikael Ymer
- (Netherlands) Botic van de Zandschulp → replaced by (Georgia (country)) Nikoloz Basilashvili

== Doubles main draw entrants ==
=== Seeds ===
Country	Player	Country	Player	Rank^{1}	Seed
GER	Kevin Krawietz	GER	Tim Pütz	46	1
MEX	Santiago González	FRA	Édouard Roger-Vasselin	53	2
GER	Andreas Mies	AUS	John Peers	59	3
NED	Robin Haase	NED	Matwé Middelkoop	60	4

- ^{1} Rankings are as of 30 January 2022.

=== Other entrants ===
The following pairs received wildcards into the doubles main draw:

- (United States) Maxime Cressy / (France) Albano Olivetti
- (France) Arthur Fils / (France) Luca Van Assche

The following pair received entry as alternates:

- (France) Théo Arribagé / (France) Luca Sanchez

=== Withdrawals ===
- (United States) Maxime Cressy / (France) Albano Olivetti → replaced by (Finland) Patrik Niklas-Salminen / (Finland) Emil Ruusuvuori
- (Australia) Matthew Ebden / (Monaco) Hugo Nys → replaced by (India) Sriram Balaji / (India) Jeevan Nedunchezhiyan
- (United Kingdom) Lloyd Glasspool / (Finland) Harri Heliövaara → replaced by (France) Manuel Guinard / (France) Fabrice Martin
- (France) Pierre-Hugues Herbert / (France) Nicolas Mahut → replaced by (France) Théo Arribagé / (France) Luca Sanchez
- (South Africa) Raven Klaasen / (Pakistan) Aisam-ul-Haq Qureshi → replaced by (Germany) Fabian Fallert / (Germany) Hendrik Jebens
