= 2023 Open Sud de France – Singles =

Singles
- 2023 Open Sud de France

Final
- Champion: (Italy) Jannik Sinner
- Runner-up: (United States) Maxime Cressy
- Score: 7–6^{(7–3)}, 6–3

Details
- Draw: 28 (4Q, 3WC)
- Seeds: 8

Events
Singles	Doubles
- Open Sud de France

Jannik Sinner defeated Maxime Cressy in the final, 7–6^{(7–3)}, 6–3 to win the singles tennis title at the 2023 Open Sud de France.

Alexander Bublik was the defending champion, but lost in the first round to Grégoire Barrère.

== Seeds ==
The top four seeds received a bye into the second round.

1. (Denmark) Holger Rune (semifinals)
2. (Italy) Jannik Sinner (champion)
3. (Croatia) Borna Ćorić (quarterfinals)
4. (Spain) Roberto Bautista Agut (second round)
5. (Spain) Alejandro Davidovich Fokina (second round)
6. (Kazakhstan) Alexander Bublik (first round)
7. (Finland) Emil Ruusuvuori (second round)
8. (France) Benjamin Bonzi (first round)

== Draw ==
Key

- Q = Qualifier
- WC = Wild card
- LL = Lucky loser
- Alt = Alternate
- ITF = ITF entry
- PR = Protected ranking
- SR = Special ranking
- SE = Special exempt
- JE = Junior exempt
- JR = Junior Accelerator Programme entrant
- CO = College Accelerator Programme entrant
- NG = Next Gen Accelerator Program entrant
- w/o = Walkover
- r = Retired
- d = Defaulted

=== Finals ===
Semifinals
1	(Denmark) Holger Rune	5	7^{7}	6^{4}
(United States) Maxime Cressy	7	6^{3}	7^{7}
WC	(France) Arthur Fils	5	2
2	(Italy) Jannik Sinner	7	6

Final
(United States) Maxime Cressy	6^{3}	3
2	(Italy) Jannik Sinner	7^{7}	6

=== Top half ===
First round
(Switzerland) M-A Hüsler	6	3	6
WC	(France) L Van Assche	3	6	3
(Georgia (country)) N Basilashvili	6^{3}	7	6
(France) C Lestienne	7^{7}	5	2
(France) G Barrère	6	6^{12}	7^{7}
6	(Kazakhstan) A Bublik	4	7^{14}	6^{3}
Q	(Italy) L Nardi	4	4
(France) A Rinderknech	6	6
(United States) M Cressy	6	6
Q	(Switzerland) A Bellier	3	2
(Sweden) M Ymer	4	0
7	(Finland) E Ruusuvuori	6	6

Second round
1	(Denmark) H Rune	7^{7}	6
(Switzerland) M-A Hüsler	6^{5}	2
(Georgia (country)) N Basilashvili	3	4
(France) G Barrère	6	6
3	(Croatia) B Ćorić	6	7
(France) A Rinderknech	3	5
(United States) M Cressy	6	6
7	(Finland) E Ruusuvuori	4	4

Quarterfinals
1	(Denmark) H Rune	7^{7}	7^{7}
(France) G Barrère	6^{2}	6^{5}
3	(Croatia) B Ćorić	6^{2}	4
(United States) M Cressy	7^{7}	6

Semifinals
1	(Denmark) H Rune	5	7^{7}	6^{4}
(United States) M Cressy	7	6^{3}	7^{7}

=== Bottom half ===
First round
5	(Spain) A Davidovich Fokina	1	7^{7}	0
WC	(France) U Humbert	6	6^{2}	0^{r}
Q	(France) C Chidekh	5	6	5
(France) Q Halys	7	2	7
WC	(France) A Fils	7	7
(France) R Gasquet	5	5
8	(France) B Bonzi	3	4
(Italy) L Sonego	6	6
(Serbia) F Krajinović	3	7^{9}	6
A Karatsev	6	6^{7}	2
(Hungary) M Fucsovics	7	5	6
Q	(France) G Blancaneaux	5	7	0

Second round
5	(Spain) A Davidovich Fokina	3	3
(France) Q Halys	6	6
WC	(France) A Fils	6	6
4	(Spain) R Bautista Agut	3	4
(Italy) L Sonego	7	6
(Serbia) F Krajinović	5	1
(Hungary) M Fucsovics
2	(Italy) J Sinner	w/o

Quarterfinals
(France) Q Halys	6^{3}	3
WC	(France) A Fils	7^{7}	6
(Italy) L Sonego	4	2
2	(Italy) J Sinner	6	6

Semifinals
WC	(France) A Fils	5	2
2	(Italy) J Sinner	7	6

== Qualifying ==
=== Seeds ===
1. (China) Zhang Zhizhen (first round)
2. (Australia) John Millman (withdrew)
3. (France) Hugo Grenier (first round)
4. (France) Geoffrey Blancaneaux (qualified)
5. (France) Manuel Guinard (first round)
6. (Italy) Luca Nardi (qualified)
7. (France) Alexandre Müller (first round)
8. (United States) Emilio Nava (first round)

=== Qualifiers ===
1. (France) Clément Chidekh
2. (Switzerland) Antoine Bellier
3. (Italy) Luca Nardi
4. (France) Geoffrey Blancaneaux

=== Qualifying draw ===
==== First qualifier ====
First round
1	(China) Zhang Zhizhen	6	3	4
Alt	(Argentina) Marco Trungelliti	1	6	6
WC	(France) Clément Chidekh	7^{8}	6
7	(France) Alexandre Müller	6^{6}	2

Qualifying competition
Alt	(Argentina) Marco Trungelliti	0	4
WC	(France) Clément Chidekh	6	6

==== Second qualifier ====
First round
Alt	(France) Albano Olivetti	4	6	4
Alt	Ivan Gakhov	6	3	6
(Switzerland) Antoine Bellier	6	7^{7}
5	(France) Manuel Guinard	4	6^{5}

Qualifying competition
Alt	Ivan Gakhov	6	6^{10}	4
(Switzerland) Antoine Bellier	3	7^{12}	6

==== Third qualifier ====
First round
3	(France) Hugo Grenier	3	3
(France) Benoît Paire	6	6
Alt	(France) Maxime Janvier	4	3
6	(Italy) Luca Nardi	6	6

Qualifying competition
(France) Benoît Paire	1	6	3
6	(Italy) Luca Nardi	6	3	6

==== Fourth qualifier ====
First round
4	(France) Geoffrey Blancaneaux	3	7	7
Alt	Alexey Vatutin	6	5	5
WC	(France) Arthur Cazaux	6	6
8	(United States) Emilio Nava	4	4

Qualifying competition
4	(France) Geoffrey Blancaneaux	5	6	7^{7}
WC	(France) Arthur Cazaux	7	4	6^{3}
