= 2019 Columbus Challenger – Doubles =

Doubles
- 2019 Columbus Challenger

Final
- Champions: (United States) Maxime Cressy (Portugal) Bernardo Saraiva
- Runners-up: (United States) Robert Galloway (United States) Nathaniel Lammons
- Score: 7–5, 7–6^{(7–3)}

Events
| Singles | Doubles |
- Columbus Challenger

Tommy Paul and Peter Polansky were the defending champions but chose not to defend their title.

Maxime Cressy and Bernardo Saraiva won the title after defeating Robert Galloway and Nathaniel Lammons 7–5, 7–6^{(7–3)} in the final.

== Seeds ==
1. (Monaco) Romain Arneodo / (Belarus) Andrei Vasilevski (quarterfinals)
2. (United States) Robert Galloway / (United States) Nathaniel Lammons (final)
3. (Portugal) Gonçalo Oliveira / (Italy) Andrea Vavassori (quarterfinals)
4. (Philippines) Ruben Gonzales / (United States) Nathan Pasha (first round)

== Draw ==
Key

- Q = Qualifier
- WC = Wild card
- LL = Lucky loser
- Alt = Alternate
- ITF = ITF entry
- PR = Protected ranking
- SR = Special ranking
- SE = Special exempt
- JE = Junior exempt
- JR = Junior Accelerator Programme entrant
- CO = College Accelerator Programme entrant
- NG = Next Gen Accelerator Program entrant
- w/o = Walkover
- r = Retired
- d = Defaulted

First round
1 | (Monaco) R Arneodo (Belarus) A Vasilevski | 7^{7} | 6^{3} | [10]
(Ecuador) G Escobar (Venezuela) R Maytín | 6^{5} | 7^{7} | [5]
ITF | (United States) M Cressy (Portugal) B Saraiva | 6 | 6
ITF | (France) Tom Jomby (France) F Reboul | 2 | 4
4 | (Philippines) R Gonzales (United States) N Pasha | 7 | 6^{5} | [9]
(United States) K King (United States) A Lawson | 5 | 7^{7} | [11]
(Mexico) H Hach Verdugo (Croatia) A Pavić | 6 | 7^{7}
(France) B Bonzi (France) J Eysseric | 4 | 6^{5}
WC | (United States) Martin Joyce (United States) Hunter Tubert | 6 | 5 | [7]
(Venezuela) LD Martínez (Sweden) A Siljeström | 2 | 7 | [10]
WC | (United States) J McNally (United States) Kyle Seelig | 4 | 3
3 | (Portugal) G Oliveira (Italy) A Vavassori | 6 | 6
WC | (United States) Alex Kobelt (Japan) J Trotter | 6 | 4 | [7]
(United States) E King (United States) H Reese | 2 | 6 | [10]
(Serbia) N Čačić (Brazil) F Romboli | 4 | 4
2 | (United States) R Galloway (United States) N Lammons | 6 | 6

Quarterfinals
1 | (Monaco) R Arneodo (Belarus) A Vasilevski | 2 | 2
ITF | (United States) M Cressy (Portugal) B Saraiva | 6 | 6
(United States) K King (United States) A Lawson | 3 | 6^{3}
(Mexico) H Hach Verdugo (Croatia) A Pavić | 6 | 7^{7}
(Venezuela) LD Martínez (Sweden) A Siljeström | 6 | 7^{7}
3 | (Portugal) G Oliveira (Italy) A Vavassori | 4 | 6^{4}
(United States) E King (United States) H Reese | 4 | 5
2 | (United States) R Galloway (United States) N Lammons | 6 | 7

Semifinals
ITF | (United States) M Cressy (Portugal) B Saraiva | 4 | 6 | [11]
(Mexico) H Hach Verdugo (Croatia) A Pavić | 6 | 2 | [9]
(Venezuela) LD Martínez (Sweden) A Siljeström | 7^{7} | 2 | [4]
2 | (United States) R Galloway (United States) N Lammons | 6^{4} | 6 | [10]

Final
ITF | (United States) M Cressy (Portugal) B Saraiva | 7 | 7^{7}
2 | (United States) R Galloway (United States) N Lammons | 5 | 6^{3}
