= 2023 Open Sud de France – Doubles =

Doubles
- 2023 Open Sud de France

Final
- Champions: (Netherlands) Robin Haase (Netherlands) Matwé Middelkoop
- Runners-up: (United States) Maxime Cressy (France) Albano Olivetti
- Score: 7–6^{(7–4)}, 4–6, [10–6]

Details
- Draw: 16
- Seeds: 4

Events
Singles	Doubles
← 2022 ·	Open Sud de France	· 2024 →

Robin Haase and Matwé Middelkoop defeated Maxime Cressy and Albano Olivetti in the final, 7–6^{(7–4)}, 4–6, [10–6] to win the doubles tennis title at the 2023 Open Sud de France.

Pierre-Hugues Herbert and Nicolas Mahut were the reigning champions, but Herbert withdrew before the tournament began. Mahut was scheduled to partner Vasek Pospisil, but the pair withdrew before their first-round match due to Pospisil's elbow injury.

== Seeds ==
1. (Germany) Kevin Krawietz / (Germany) Tim Pütz (semifinals)
2. (Mexico) Santiago González / (France) Édouard Roger-Vasselin (quarterfinals)
3. (Germany) Andreas Mies / (Australia) John Peers (quarterfinals)
4. (Netherlands) Robin Haase / (Netherlands) Matwé Middelkoop (champions)

== Draw ==
=== Key ===
- Q = Qualifier
- WC = Wild card
- LL = Lucky loser
- Alt = Alternate
- SE = Special exempt
- PR = Protected ranking
- ITF = ITF entry
- JE = Junior exempt
- w/o = Walkover
- r = Retired
- d = Defaulted
- SR = Special ranking

=== Draw ===
First round
1	(Germany) K Krawietz (Germany) T Pütz	6	6
(France) G Barrère (France) Q Halys	4	2
(France) M Guinard (France) F Martin	7^{7}	7^{7}
(Finland) P Niklas-Salminen (Finland) E Ruusuvuori	6^{3}	6^{5}
4	(Netherlands) R Haase (Netherlands) M Middelkoop	6	6
(India) S Balaji (India) J Nedunchezhiyan	4	4
(Germany) F Fallert (Germany) H Jebens
Alt	(France) T Arribagé (France) L Sanchez	w/o
(Netherlands) S Arends (Netherlands) D Pel	7^{7}	6
(Austria) A Erler (Austria) L Miedler	6^{2}	4
(Czech Republic) R Jebavý (Czech Republic) A Pavlásek	4	4
3	(Germany) A Mies (Australia) J Peers	6	6
WC	(United States) M Cressy (France) A Olivetti	6	4	[10]
(Austria) P Oswald (India) R Ramanathan	3	6	[8]
WC	(France) A Fils (France) L Van Assche	3	6	[4]
2	(Mexico) S González (France) É Roger-Vasselin	6	0	[10]

Quarterfinals
1	(Germany) K Krawietz (Germany) T Pütz	6	6
(France) M Guinard (France) F Martin	4	4
4	(Netherlands) R Haase (Netherlands) M Middelkoop	3	6	[13]
Alt	(France) T Arribagé (France) L Sanchez	6	2	[11]
(Netherlands) S Arends (Netherlands) D Pel	4	7^{7}	[10]
3	(Germany) A Mies (Australia) J Peers	6	6^{4}	[8]
WC	(United States) M Cressy (France) A Olivetti	6	6
2	(Mexico) S González (France) É Roger-Vasselin	1	2

Semifinals
1	(Germany) K Krawietz (Germany) T Pütz	6	3	[8]
4	(Netherlands) R Haase (Netherlands) M Middelkoop	4	6	[10]
(Netherlands) S Arends (Netherlands) D Pel	1	4
WC	(United States) M Cressy (France) A Olivetti	6	6

Final
4	(Netherlands) R Haase (Netherlands) M Middelkoop	7^{7}	4	[10]
WC	(United States) M Cressy (France) A Olivetti	6^{4}	6	[6]
