= 2022 Open Sud de France – Singles =

Singles
- 2022 Open Sud de France

Final
- Champion: (Kazakhstan) Alexander Bublik
- Runner-up: (Germany) Alexander Zverev
- Score: 6–4, 6–3

Details
- Draw: 28 (4Q, 3WC)
- Seeds: 8

Events
Singles	Doubles
- Open Sud de France

Alexander Bublik defeated Alexander Zverev in the final, 6–4, 6–3 to win the singles title at the 2022 Open Sud de France. It was his maiden ATP Tour title.

David Goffin was the defending champion, but lost to Adrian Mannarino in the second round.

== Seeds ==
The top four seeds received a bye into the second round.

1. (Germany) Alexander Zverev (final)
2. (Spain) Roberto Bautista Agut (quarterfinals)
3. (France) Gaël Monfils (second round)
4. (Georgia (country)) Nikoloz Basilashvili (second round)
5. (Serbia) Filip Krajinović (semifinals)
6. (Kazakhstan) Alexander Bublik (champion)
7. (France) Ugo Humbert (first round)
8. (Belgium) David Goffin (second round)

== Draw ==
Key

- Q = Qualifier
- WC = Wild card
- LL = Lucky loser
- Alt = Alternate
- ITF = ITF entry
- PR = Protected ranking
- SR = Special ranking
- SE = Special exempt
- JE = Junior exempt
- JR = Junior Accelerator Programme entrant
- CO = College Accelerator Programme entrant
- NG = Next Gen Accelerator Program entrant
- w/o = Walkover
- r = Retired
- d = Defaulted

=== Finals ===
Semifinals
1/WC	(Germany) Alexander Zverev	6	6
(Sweden) Mikael Ymer	1	3
5	(Serbia) Filip Krajinović	4	2
6	(Kazakhstan) Alexander Bublik	6	6

Final
1/WC	(Germany) Alexander Zverev	4	3
6	(Kazakhstan) Alexander Bublik	6	6

=== Top half ===
First round
(Belarus) I Ivashka	3	6^{2}
(United States) M McDonald	6	7^{7}
(Spain) A Davidovich Fokina	2	4
(France) A Mannarino	6	6
(France) B Bonzi	6	5	1
8/WC	(Belgium) D Goffin	2	7	6
(France) C Moutet	6^{5}	4
(Sweden) M Ymer	7^{7}	6
(France) H Gaston	2	1
(South Korea) S-w Kwon	6	6
(France) R Gasquet	6^{3}	6	6
7	(France) U Humbert	7^{7}	4	3

Second round
1/WC	(Germany) A Zverev	6	7^{7}
(United States) M McDonald	2	6^{5}
(France) A Mannarino	6	6
8/WC	(Belgium) D Goffin	4	2
3	(France) G Monfils	1	2
(Sweden) M Ymer	6	6
(South Korea) S-w Kwon	5	4
(France) R Gasquet	7	6

Quarterfinals
1/WC	(Germany) A Zverev	6	6
(France) A Mannarino	1	0
(Sweden) M Ymer	7	6^{6}	6
(France) R Gasquet	5	7^{8}	1

Semifinals
1/WC	(Germany) A Zverev	6	6
(Sweden) M Ymer	1	3

=== Bottom half ===
First round
5	(Serbia) F Krajinović	7	7^{7}
(Australia) A Popyrin	5	6^{3}
PR	(France) J-W Tsonga	6	6
Q	(Poland) K Żuk	4	4
(Slovakia) A Molčan	6^{5}	0
Q	(Bosnia and Herzegovina) D Džumhur	7^{7}	6
6	(Kazakhstan) A Bublik	7^{7}	7^{7}
(Netherlands) T Griekspoor	6^{4}	6^{5}
Q	(France) P-H Herbert	7	6
(Germany) P Gojowczyk	5	2
WC	(France) L Pouille	6^{4}	7	4
Q	(France) G Simon	7^{7}	5	6

Second round
5	(Serbia) F Krajinović	6	7^{7}
PR	(France) J-W Tsonga	4	6^{2}
Q	(Bosnia and Herzegovina) D Džumhur	6	5	6
4	(Georgia (country)) N Basilashvili	1	7	2
6	(Kazakhstan) A Bublik	6	6^{2}	6
Q	(France) P-H Herbert	3	7^{7}	2
Q	(France) G Simon	4	2^{r}
2	(Spain) R Bautista Agut	6	3

Quarterfinals
5	(Serbia) F Krajinović	7	6
Q	(Bosnia and Herzegovina) D Džumhur	5	2
6	(Kazakhstan) A Bublik	6	2	7^{7}
2	(Spain) R Bautista Agut	4	6	6^{4}

Semifinals
5	(Serbia) F Krajinović	4	2
6	(Kazakhstan) A Bublik	6	6

== Qualifying ==
=== Seeds ===
1. (Switzerland) Henri Laaksonen (first round)
2. (Spain) Feliciano López (first round)
3. (France) Pierre-Hugues Herbert (qualified)
4. (France) Gilles Simon (qualified)
5. (Czech Republic) Jiří Lehečka (first round)
6. (Russia) Roman Safiullin (qualifying competition)
7. (Germany) Mats Moraing (withdrew)
8. (Bosnia and Herzegovina) Damir Džumhur (qualified)

=== Qualifiers ===
1. (Poland) Kacper Żuk
2. (Bosnia and Herzegovina) Damir Džumhur
3. (France) Pierre-Hugues Herbert
4. (France) Gilles Simon

=== Qualifying draw ===
==== First qualifier ====
First round
1	(Switzerland) Henri Laaksonen	2	6	3
(Poland) Kacper Żuk	6	1	6
WC	(France) Luca Van Assche	1	1
6	(Russia) Roman Safiullin	6	6

Qualifying competition
(Poland) Kacper Żuk	6	6^{4}	7
6	(Russia) Roman Safiullin	4	7^{7}	5

==== Second qualifier ====
First round
2	(Spain) Feliciano López	1	4
Alt	(Latvia) Ernests Gulbis	6	6
(Belgium) Zizou Bergs	5	2
8	(Bosnia and Herzegovina) Damir Džumhur	7	6

Qualifying competition
Alt	(Latvia) Ernests Gulbis	6^{4}	2
8	(Bosnia and Herzegovina) Damir Džumhur	7^{7}	6

==== Third qualifier ====
First round
3	(France) Pierre-Hugues Herbert	4	6	6
WC	(France) Sascha Gueymard Wayenburg	6	3	2
(Kazakhstan) Mikhail Kukushkin	6	6
5	(Czech Republic) Jiří Lehečka	2	3

Qualifying competition
3	(France) Pierre-Hugues Herbert	7^{7}	7
(Kazakhstan) Mikhail Kukushkin	6^{3}	5

==== Fourth qualifier ====
First round
4	(France) Gilles Simon	7^{9}	7^{9}
(Switzerland) Marc-Andrea Hüsler	6^{7}	6^{7}
Alt	(Slovakia) Lukáš Lacko	6^{6}	2
Alt	(France) Antoine Hoang	7^{8}	6

Qualifying competition
4	(France) Gilles Simon	6	7
Alt	(France) Antoine Hoang	4	5
