= Bernardo Saraiva =

Portuguese tennis player (born 1993)

- Country (sports): Portugal
- Residence: San Francisco, United States
- Born: 6 August 1993 (age 32) Lisbon, Portugal
- Height: 1.88 m (6 ft 2 in)
- Plays: Right-handed (two-handed backhand)
- Prize money: $47,594

Singles
- Career record: 0–0
- Career titles: 0
- Highest ranking: No. 694 (4 December 2017)

Doubles
- Career record: 0–0
- Career titles: 0; 1 Challenger, 13 Futures
- Highest ranking: No. 205 (9 September 2019)

Bernardo Saraiva (born 6 August 1993) is a Portuguese tennis player.

Saraiva has a career-high ATP singles ranking of No. 694 achieved on 4 December 2017. He also has a career high doubles ranking of No. 205 achieved on 9 September 2019.

Saraiva has won 1 ATP Challenger doubles title at the 2019 Columbus Challenger.

== Challenger and Futures finals ==
=== Singles: 2 (0–2) ===
| Legend (singles) ATP Challenger Tour (0–0) ITF Futures Tour (0–2) | Titles by surface Hard (0–0) Clay (0–2) Grass (0–0) Carpet (0–0) |

| Result | W–L | Date | Tournament | Tier | Surface | Opponent | Score |
|---|---|---|---|---|---|---|---|
| Loss | 0–1 | Aug 2017 | Egypt F23, Cairo | Futures | Clay | (France) Thomas Bréchemier | 2–6, 4–6 |
| Loss | 0–2 | Nov 2017 | Brazil F3, São Paulo | Futures | Clay | (Brazil) José Pereira | 4–6, 3–6 |

=== Doubles: 28 (14–14) ===
| Legend (doubles) ATP Challenger Tour (1–0) ITF Futures Tour (13–14) | Titles by surface Hard (12–12) Clay (2–2) Grass (0–0) Carpet (0–0) |

| Result | W–L | Date | Tournament | Tier | Surface | Partner | Opponents | Score |
|---|---|---|---|---|---|---|---|---|
| Loss | 0–1 | May 2016 | India F3, Jassowal | Futures | Hard | (United States) John Lamble | (India) Sriram Balaji (India) Vijay Sundar Prashanth | 3–6, 3–6 |
| Loss | 0–2 | Jun 2016 | Mozambique F1, Maputo | Futures | Hard | (United States) John Lamble | (United States) Christopher Grant (United States) Michael Grant | 2–6, 6–1, [8–10] |
| Loss | 0–3 | Jun 2016 | Mozambique F2, Maputo | Futures | Hard | (United States) John Lamble | (Zimbabwe) Benjamin Lock (Zimbabwe) Courtney John Lock | 4–6, 3–6 |
| Loss | 0–4 | Dec 2016 | Israel F16, Ramat Gan | Futures | Hard | (Canada) Martin Beran | (United States) John Lamble (Netherlands) Sem Verbeek | 4–6, 4–6 |
| Win | 1–4 | Dec 2016 | Israel F18, Ramat Gan | Futures | Hard | (Austria) David Pichler | (Israel) Shahar Elbaz (Ukraine) Volodymyr Uzhylovskyi | w/o |
| Loss | 1–5 | May 2017 | Mexico F3, Córdoba | Futures | Hard | (United States) Hunter Callahan | (United Kingdom) Farris Fathi Gosea (United States) Nathaniel Lammons | 4–6, 7–6^{(7–5)}, [8–10] |
| Win | 2–5 | Jun 2017 | Guam F1, Tumon | Futures | Hard | (United States) Connor Farren | (Japan) Masaki Sasai (Japan) Shunrou Takeshima | 7–6^{(7–1)}, 7–6^{(7–4)} |
| Loss | 2–6 | Jul 2017 | Egypt F20, Sharm El Sheikh | Futures | Hard | (United States) Nathaniel Lammons | (Italy) Julian Ocleppo (Italy) Andrea Vavassori | 6–2, 3–6, [8–10] |
| Loss | 2–7 | Jul 2017 | Egypt F22, Cairo | Futures | Clay | (Argentina) Eduardo Agustín Torre | (Tunisia) Anis Ghorbel (Benin) Alexis Klégou | 0–6, 4–6 |
| Loss | 2–8 | Aug 2017 | Egypt F23, Cairo | Futures | Clay | (Argentina) Eduardo Agustín Torre | (Czech Republic) Filip Duda (Egypt) Issam Haitham Taweel | 4–6, 5–2 ret. |
| Win | 3–8 | Aug 2017 | Turkey F29, Mersin | Futures | Clay | (Serbia) Nikola Čačić | (Russia) Bogdan Bobrov (Serbia) Goran Marković | 6–2, 3–6, [11–9] |
| Win | 4–8 | Aug 2017 | Portugal F16, Sintra | Futures | Hard | (Portugal) Nuno Deus | (Kuwait) Abdullah Maqdes (Spain) Javier Pulgar-García | 7–5, 6–2 |
| Loss | 4–9 | Sep 2017 | Portugal F18, Sintra | Futures | Hard | (Portugal) Nuno Deus | (Spain) David Pérez Sanz (Spain) Jaime Pulgar-García | 4–6, 2–6 |
| Win | 5–9 | Dec 2017 | Dominican Republic F2, Santo Domingo Este | Futures | Hard | (Netherlands) Sem Verbeek | (Switzerland) Adrien Bodmer (Austria) Matthias Haim | 7–5, 6–4 |
| Win | 6–9 | Dec 2017 | Dominican Republic F3, Santo Domingo Este | Futures | Hard | (Netherlands) Sem Verbeek | (Dominican Republic) Nick Hardt (Dominican Republic) José Olivares | 6–3, 6–4 |
| Win | 7–9 | Mar 2018 | USA F7, Bakersfield | Futures | Hard | (Netherlands) Sem Verbeek | (Bolivia) Boris Arias (Bolivia) Federico Zeballos | 7–6^{(7–2)}, 6–3 |
| Loss | 7–10 | Mar 2018 | USA F8, Calabasas | Futures | Hard | (Netherlands) Sem Verbeek | (Sweden) André Göransson (France) Florian Lakat | 2–6, 6–7^{(3–7)} |
| Win | 8–10 | Apr 2018 | Tunisia F16, Jerba | Futures | Hard | (Netherlands) Sem Verbeek | (Croatia) Domagoj Bilješko (Turkey) Altuğ Çelikbilek | 6–3, 6–1 |
| Win | 9–10 | May 2018 | Tunisia F17, Jerba | Futures | Hard | (Netherlands) Sem Verbeek | (Argentina) Ignacio Carou (Ecuador) Diego Hidalgo | 7–5, 6–3 |
| Loss | 9–11 | Jul 2018 | Ecuador F1, Manta | Futures | Hard | (Brazil) Oscar José Gutierrez | (United States) Jordi Arconada (Ecuador) Emilio Gómez | 5–7, 3–6 |
| Win | 10–11 | Aug 2018 | Portugal F16, Sintra | Futures | Hard | (Netherlands) Sem Verbeek | (Portugal) Gonçalo Falcão (Brazil) Diego Matos | 6–3, 6–0 |
| Loss | 10–12 | Oct 2018 | USA F27, Houston | Futures | Hard | (United States) John Paul Fruttero | (France) Maxime Cressy (United States) Nicolas Meister | 5–7, 3–6 |
| Loss | 10–13 | Nov 2018 | Thailand F8, Nonthaburi | Futures | Hard | (Philippines) Francis Casey Alcantara | (Chinese Taipei) Hsu Yu-hsiou (Chinese Taipei) Yu Cheng-yu | 1–6, 0–6 |
| Win | 11–13 | Dec 2018 | Egypt F29, Cairo | Futures | Clay | (Russia) Alexander Igoshin | (Venezuela) Jordi Muñoz Abreu (Italy) Fabrizio Ornago | 6–4, 6–2 |
| Loss | 11–14 | Dec 2018 | Qatar F4, Doha | Futures | Hard | (Portugal) Gonçalo Oliveira | (Russia) Alexander Igoshin (Russia) Evgenii Tiurnev | 6–7^{(12–14)}, 3–6 |
| Win | 12–14 | Dec 2018 | Qatar F5, Doha | Futures | Hard | (Portugal) Gonçalo Oliveira | (Italy) Adelchi Virgili (Qatar) Mubarak Shannan Zayid | 4–6, 6–3, [13–11] |
| Win | 13–14 | Dec 2018 | Qatar F6, Doha | Futures | Hard | (Russia) Alexander Igoshin | (Belarus) Mikalai Haliak (Russia) Alexander Zhurbin | 6–2, 6–4 |
| Win | 14–14 | Jan 2019 | Columbus, USA | Challenger | Hard (i) | (United States) Maxime Cressy | (United States) Robert Galloway (United States) Nathaniel Lammons | 7–5, 7–6^{(7–3)} |
