= 2019 Columbus Challenger – Singles =

Singles
- 2019 Columbus Challenger

Final
- Champion: (United States) J. J. Wolf
- Runner-up: (Denmark) Mikael Torpegaard
- Score: 6–7^{(4–7)}, 6–3, 6–4

Events
| Singles | Doubles |
- Columbus Challenger

Michael Mmoh was the defending champion but chose not to defend his title.

J. J. Wolf won the title after defeating Mikael Torpegaard 6–7^{(4–7)}, 6–3, 6–4 in the final.

== Seeds ==
All seeds receive a bye into the second round.

1. (Netherlands) Thiemo de Bakker (second round)
2. (Canada) Filip Peliwo (third round)
3. (Slovakia) Norbert Gombos (third round)
4. (Belarus) Uladzimir Ignatik (quarterfinals)
5. (Colombia) Santiago Giraldo (third round)
6. (United States) Dennis Novikov (second round)
7. (France) Benjamin Bonzi (second round)
8. (United States) Kevin King (second round)
9. (Portugal) Gastão Elias (third round)
10. (Croatia) Nino Serdarušić (second round)
11. (France) Mathias Bourgue (second round)
12. (Spain) Bernabé Zapata Miralles (semifinals)
13. (Dominican Republic) José Hernández-Fernández (second round)
14. (France) Johan Tatlot (second round)
15. (Italy) Gianluca Mager (second round)
16. (Spain) Mario Vilella Martínez (third round)

== Draw ==
Key

- Q = Qualifier
- WC = Wild card
- LL = Lucky loser
- Alt = Alternate
- ITF = ITF entry
- PR = Protected ranking
- SR = Special ranking
- SE = Special exempt
- JE = Junior exempt
- JR = Junior Accelerator Programme entrant
- CO = College Accelerator Programme entrant
- NG = Next Gen Accelerator Program entrant
- w/o = Walkover
- r = Retired
- d = Defaulted

=== Finals ===
Quarterfinals
(Austria) Lucas Miedler | 6^{4} | 2
12 | (Spain) Bernabé Zapata Miralles | 7^{7} | 6
WC | (Denmark) Mikael Torpegaard | 6^{4} | 7^{7} | 6
(France) Vincent Millot | 7^{7} | 6^{4} | 0
(Netherlands) Scott Griekspoor | 7^{9} | 3 | 6
4 | (Belarus) Uladzimir Ignatik | 6^{7} | 6 | 3
(United Kingdom) Jan Choinski | 2 | 1
WC | (United States) J. J. Wolf | 6 | 6

Semifinals
12 | (Spain) Bernabé Zapata Miralles | 3 | 5
WC | (Denmark) Mikael Torpegaard | 6 | 7
(Netherlands) Scott Griekspoor | 1 | 3
WC | (United States) J. J. Wolf | 6 | 6

Final
WC | (Denmark) Mikael Torpegaard | 7^{7} | 3 | 4
WC | (United States) J. J. Wolf | 6^{4} | 6 | 6

=== Top half ===
==== Section 1 ====
First round
ITF | (France) Tom Jomby | 4 | 6 | 3
(Austria) L Miedler | 6 | 3 | 6
ITF | (France) F Reboul | 4 | 6 | 3
Q | (Brazil) J Menezes | 6 | 4 | 6
ITF | (Brazil) J Souza | 4 | 1
(Portugal) G Oliveira | 6 | 6
(Spain) C Taberner | 4 | 6 | 3
(United States) M Giron | 6 | 3 | 6

Second round
1 | (Netherlands) T de Bakker | 3 | 3
(Austria) L Miedler | 6 | 6
Q | (Brazil) J Menezes | 2 | 6^{5}
16 | (Spain) M Vilella Martínez | 6 | 7^{7}
12 | (Spain) B Zapata Miralles | 1 | 7^{7} | 7
(Portugal) G Oliveira | 6 | 6^{5} | 5
(United States) M Giron | 6 | 6
8 | (United States) K King | 2 | 4

Third round
(Austria) L Miedler | 6 | 6
16 | (Spain) M Vilella Martínez | 3 | 3
12 | (Spain) B Zapata Miralles | 6 | 7^{7}
(United States) M Giron | 4 | 6^{3}

Quarterfinals
(Austria) L Miedler | 6^{4} | 2
12 | (Spain) B Zapata Miralles | 7^{7} | 6

==== Section 2 ====
First round
(Spain) R Ortega Olmedo | 6 | 6
WC | (United States) J McNally | 2 | 2
(Croatia) A Pavić | 3 | 5
WC | (Denmark) M Torpegaard | 6 | 7
WC | (United States) Kyle Seelig | 1 | 3
ITF | (Netherlands) J Sels | 6 | 6
(France) V Millot | 6 | 6
(Japan) K Uchida | 4 | 4

Second round
3 | (Slovakia) N Gombos | 6 | 5 | 7^{7}
(Spain) R Ortega Olmedo | 4 | 7 | 6^{3}
WC | (Denmark) M Torpegaard | 6 | 6
13 | (Dominican Republic) J Hernández-Fernández | 3 | 0
9 | (Portugal) G Elias | 6^{4} | 7^{7} | 6
ITF | (Netherlands) J Sels | 7^{7} | 6^{4} | 4
(France) V Millot | 7 | 7^{7}
6 | (United States) D Novikov | 5 | 6^{3}

Third round
3 | (Slovakia) N Gombos | 6^{0} | 3
WC | (Denmark) M Torpegaard | 7^{7} | 6
9 | (Portugal) G Elias | 4 | 6 | 1
(France) V Millot | 6 | 1 | 6

Quarterfinals
WC | (Denmark) M Torpegaard | 6^{4} | 7^{7} | 6
(France) V Millot | 7^{7} | 6^{4} | 0

=== Bottom half ===
==== Section 3 ====
First round
(Argentina) F Coria | 4 | 1
(United States) E King | 6 | 6
(Czech Republic) V Šafránek | 3 | 2
(Netherlands) S Griekspoor | 6 | 6
(Argentina) A Collarini | 6^{4} | 2
(France) E Couacaud | 7^{7} | 6
(United States) U Blanch | 6^{2} | 4
Q | (Netherlands) G Brouwer | 7^{7} | 6

Second round
5 | (Colombia) S Giraldo | 6 | 6
(United States) E King | 4 | 4
(Netherlands) S Griekspoor | 3 | 6 | 6
10 | (Croatia) N Serdarušić | 6 | 3 | 4
14 | (France) J Tatlot | 4 | 1
(France) E Couacaud | 6 | 6
Q | (Netherlands) G Brouwer | 6 | 6^{6} | 2
4 | (Belarus) U Ignatik | 3 | 7^{8} | 6

Third round
5 | (Colombia) S Giraldo | 1 | 4
(Netherlands) S Griekspoor | 6 | 6
(France) E Couacaud | 3 | 6 | 6^{1}
4 | (Belarus) U Ignatik | 6 | 3 | 7^{7}

Quarterfinals
(Netherlands) S Griekspoor | 7^{9} | 3 | 6
4 | (Belarus) U Ignatik | 6^{7} | 6 | 3

==== Section 4 ====
First round
(United Kingdom) J Choinski | 6 | 6
(Colombia) A González | 2 | 3
(Lithuania) L Grigelis | 3 | 6 | 7
(United Kingdom) L Broady | 6 | 0 | 5
WC | (United States) J. J. Wolf | 6 | 7^{7}
(United States) S Kozlov | 2 | 6^{4}
WC | (United States) Martin Joyce | 4 | 6 | 4
(Spain) R Ojeda Lara | 6 | 2 | 6

Second round
7 | (France) B Bonzi | 3 | 3
(United Kingdom) J Choinski | 6 | 6
(Lithuania) L Grigelis | 3 | 6 | 6
11 | (France) M Bourgue | 6 | 3 | 4
15 | (Italy) G Mager | 6 | 3 | 5
WC | (United States) J. J. Wolf | 4 | 6 | 7
(Spain) R Ojeda Lara | 7 | 3 | 3
2 | (Canada) F Peliwo | 5 | 6 | 6

Third round
(United Kingdom) J Choinski | 7^{7} | 4 | 6
(Lithuania) L Grigelis | 6^{4} | 6 | 2
WC | (United States) J. J. Wolf | 6 | 6
2 | (Canada) F Peliwo | 0 | 0

Quarterfinals
(United Kingdom) J Choinski | 2 | 1
WC | (United States) J. J. Wolf | 6 | 6
