= 2022 ABN AMRO Rotterdam =

- Date: 7–13 February
- Edition: 49th
- Category: ATP Tour 500
- Draw: 32S / 16D
- Prize money: €1,349,070
- Surface: Hard (Indoor)
- Location: Rotterdam, Netherlands
- Venue: Rotterdam Ahoy

Champions

Singles
- (Canada) Félix Auger-Aliassime

Doubles
- (Netherlands) Robin Haase / (Netherlands) Matwé Middelkoop

Wheelchair singles
- (United Kingdom) Alfie Hewett

Wheelchair doubles
- (France) Stéphane Houdet / (France) Nicolas Peifer
- Rotterdam Open

The 2022 ABN AMRO Rotterdam was a men's tennis tournament played on indoor hard courts. It took place at the Rotterdam Ahoy in the Dutch city of Rotterdam, between 7 and 13 February 2022. It was the 49th edition of the Rotterdam Open, and part of the ATP Tour 500 series on the 2022 ATP Tour. The tournament also includes a Men's Wheelchair Tennis Singles and Doubles draw.

== Finals ==
=== Singles ===
- (Canada) Félix Auger-Aliassime defeated (Greece) Stefanos Tsitsipas, 6–4, 6–2

=== Doubles ===
- (Netherlands) Robin Haase / (Netherlands) Matwé Middelkoop defeated (South Africa) Lloyd Harris / (Germany) Tim Pütz, 4–6, 7–6^{(7–5)}, [10–5]

== Points and prize money ==
=== Point distribution ===
Event	W	F	SF	QF	Round of 16	Round of 32	Q	Q2	Q1
Singles	500	300	180	90	45	0	20	10	0
Doubles	500	300	180	90	0	—N/a	—N/a	—N/a	—N/a

=== Prize money ===
Event	W	F	SF	QF	Round of 16	Round of 32	Q2	Q1
Singles	€109,565	€81,290	€57,725	€38,875	€24,745	€14,135	€7,070	€3,635
Doubles*	€40,050	€30,630	€21,210	€14,130	€8,250	—N/a	—N/a	—N/a

_{*per team}

== Singles main-draw entrants ==
=== Seeds ===
Country	Player	Ranking^{1}	Seed
GRE	Stefanos Tsitsipas	4	1
RUS	Andrey Rublev	7	2
CAN	Félix Auger-Aliassime	9	3
POL	Hubert Hurkacz	11	4
CAN	Denis Shapovalov	12	5
GBR	Cameron Norrie	13	6
RUS	Aslan Karatsev	15	7
GEO	Nikoloz Basilashvili	21	8

- ^{1} Rankings are as of 31 January 2022.

=== Other entrants ===
The following players received wildcards into the main draw:

- (Netherlands) Tallon Griekspoor
- (United Kingdom) Andy Murray
- (France) Jo-Wilfried Tsonga

The following player received a special exempt into the main draw:

- (Sweden) Mikael Ymer

The following players received entry from the qualifying draw:

- (Belarus) Egor Gerasimov
- (Switzerland) Henri Laaksonen
- (Czech Republic) Jiří Lehečka
- (Spain) Bernabé Zapata Miralles

The following player received entry as a lucky loser:

- (France) Hugo Gaston

=== Withdrawals ===
- (Spain) Roberto Bautista Agut → replaced by (South Korea) Kwon Soon-woo
- (France) Arthur Rinderknech → replaced by (France) Hugo Gaston
- (Croatia) Borna Ćorić → replaced by (Spain) Alejandro Davidovich Fokina
- (Russia) Daniil Medvedev → replaced by (United States) Mackenzie McDonald
- (France) Gaël Monfils → replaced by (Australia) Alexei Popyrin
- (Italy) Jannik Sinner → replaced by (Netherlands) Botic van de Zandschulp

== Doubles main-draw entrants ==
=== Seeds ===
Country	Player	Country	Player	Rank^{1}	Seed
CRO	Nikola Mektić	CRO	Mate Pavić	3	1
CRO	Ivan Dodig	BRA	Marcelo Melo	38	2
FRA	Nicolas Mahut	FRA	Fabrice Martin	38	3
NED	Wesley Koolhof	GBR	Neal Skupski	41	4

- ^{1} Rankings as of 31 January 2022.

=== Other entrants ===
The following pairs received wildcards into the doubles main draw:

- (Netherlands) Tallon Griekspoor / (Netherlands) Botic van de Zandschulp
- (Netherlands) Robin Haase / (Netherlands) Matwé Middelkoop

The following pair received entry from the qualifying draw:

- (Netherlands) Jesper de Jong / (Netherlands) Sem Verbeek

=== Withdrawals ===
Before the tournament

- (Germany) Tim Pütz / (New Zealand) Michael Venus → replaced by (South Africa) Lloyd Harris / (Germany) Tim Pütz
