= 2022 ABN AMRO Rotterdam – Singles =

Singles
- 2022 ABN AMRO Rotterdam

Final
- Champion: (Canada) Félix Auger-Aliassime
- Runner-up: (Greece) Stefanos Tsitsipas
- Score: 6–4, 6–2

Details
- Draw: 32 (4 Q / 3 WC )
- Seeds: 8

Events
Singles	Doubles
- ABN AMRO Rotterdam

Félix Auger-Aliassime defeated Stefanos Tsitsipas in the final, 6–4, 6–2 to win the singles tennis title at the 2022 Rotterdam Open. It was his first ATP Tour singles title, following eight runner-up finishes in prior finals.

Andrey Rublev was the defending champion, but lost in the semifinals to Auger-Aliassime. Rublev reached his 11th consecutive quarterfinal at an ATP 500 tournament.

== Seeds ==
1. (Greece) Stefanos Tsitsipas (final)
2. (Russia) Andrey Rublev (semifinals)
3. (Canada) Félix Auger-Aliassime (champion)
4. (Poland) Hubert Hurkacz (second round)
5. (Canada) Denis Shapovalov (first round)
6. (United Kingdom) Cameron Norrie (quarterfinals)
7. (Russia) Aslan Karatsev (first round)
8. (Georgia (country)) Nikoloz Basilashvili (first round)

== Draw ==
Key

- Q = Qualifier
- WC = Wild card
- LL = Lucky loser
- Alt = Alternate
- ITF = ITF entry
- PR = Protected ranking
- SR = Special ranking
- SE = Special exempt
- JE = Junior exempt
- JR = Junior Accelerator Programme entrant
- CO = College Accelerator Programme entrant
- NG = Next Gen Accelerator Program entrant
- w/o = Walkover
- r = Retired
- d = Defaulted

=== Finals ===
Semifinals
1	(Greece) Stefanos Tsitsipas	4	6	6
Q	(Czech Republic) Jiří Lehečka	6	4	2
3	(Canada) Félix Auger-Aliassime	6^{5}	6	6
2	(Russia) Andrey Rublev	7^{7}	4	2

Final
1	(Greece) Stefanos Tsitsipas	4	2
3	(Canada) Félix Auger-Aliassime	6	6

=== Top half ===
First round
1	(Greece) S Tsitsipas	7	6^{1}	6
(Spain) A Davidovich Fokina	5	7^{7}	4
(South Africa) L Harris	2	3
(Belarus) I Ivashka	6	6
(Belgium) D Goffin	0	3
(Australia) A de Minaur	6	6
(United States) M McDonald	6	6
8	(Georgia (country)) N Basilashvili	3	2
4	(Poland) H Hurkacz	6	7^{9}
WC	(France) J-W Tsonga	4	6^{7}
(Italy) L Musetti	6	6^{4}	6
SE	(Sweden) M Ymer	3	7^{7}	3
Q	(Spain) B Zapata Miralles	1	2
(Netherlands) B van de Zandschulp	6	6
Q	(Czech Republic) J Lehečka	6	6
5	(Canada) D Shapovalov	4	4

Second round
1	(Greece) S Tsitsipas	6	6
(Belarus) I Ivashka	4	1
(Australia) A de Minaur	7^{8}	1	6
(United States) M McDonald	6^{6}	6	4
4	(Poland) H Hurkacz	3	7	3
(Italy) L Musetti	6	5	6
(Netherlands) B van de Zandschulp	6	4	4
Q	(Czech Republic) J Lehečka	1	6	6

Quarterfinals
1	(Greece) S Tsitsipas	6	6
(Australia) A de Minaur	4	4
(Italy) L Musetti	3	6	5
Q	(Czech Republic) J Lehečka	6	1	7

Semifinals
1	(Greece) S Tsitsipas	4	6	6
Q	(Czech Republic) J Lehečka	6	4	2

=== Bottom half ===
First round
6	(United Kingdom) C Norrie	6	6
(France) U Humbert	2	4
(Russia) K Khachanov	6^{4}	6	7^{8}
(Australia) A Popyrin	7^{7}	1	6^{6}
(Kazakhstan) A Bublik	6^{6}	4
WC	(United Kingdom) A Murray	7^{8}	6
Q	(Belarus) E Gerasimov	6	2	2
3	(Canada) F Auger-Aliassime	3	6	6
7	(Russia) A Karatsev	6	6^{2}	6^{0}
WC	(Netherlands) T Griekspoor	2	7^{7}	7^{7}
(Serbia) F Krajinović	6	3	2
(Hungary) M Fucsovics	3	6	6
LL	(France) H Gaston	3	3
(South Korea) S-w Kwon	6	6
Q	(Switzerland) H Laaksonen	4	4
2	(Russia) A Rublev	6	6

Second round
6	(United Kingdom) C Norrie	6	7^{7}
(Russia) K Khachanov	4	6^{5}
WC	(United Kingdom) A Murray	3	4
3	(Canada) F Auger-Aliassime	6	6
WC	(Netherlands) T Griekspoor	4	6^{4}
(Hungary) M Fucsovics	6	7^{7}
(South Korea) S-w Kwon	3	3
2	(Russia) A Rublev	6	6

Quarterfinals
6	(United Kingdom) C Norrie	5	6^{4}
3	(Canada) F Auger-Aliassime	7	7^{7}
(Hungary) M Fucsovics	4	3
2	(Russia) A Rublev	6	6

Semifinals
3	(Canada) F Auger-Aliassime	6^{5}	6	6
2	(Russia) A Rublev	7^{7}	4	2

== Qualifying ==
=== Seeds ===
1. (France) Hugo Gaston (qualifying competition, lucky loser)
2. (Switzerland) Henri Laaksonen (qualified)
3. (France) Corentin Moutet (qualifying competition)
4. (Belarus) Egor Gerasimov (qualified)
5. (Spain) Bernabé Zapata Miralles (qualified)
6. (Germany) Philipp Kohlschreiber (qualifying competition)
7. (Czech Republic) Jiří Lehečka (qualified)
8. (Italy) Salvatore Caruso (first round)

=== Qualifiers ===
1. (Spain) Bernabé Zapata Miralles
2. (Switzerland) Henri Laaksonen
3. (Czech Republic) Jiří Lehečka
4. (Belarus) Egor Gerasimov

=== Lucky loser ===
1. (France) Hugo Gaston

=== Qualifying draw ===
==== First qualifier ====
First round
1	(France) Hugo Gaston	6	7^{7}
WC	(Netherlands) Robin Haase	1	6^{4}
(Italy) Flavio Cobolli	4	1
5	(Spain) Bernabé Zapata Miralles	6	6

Qualifying competition
1	(France) Hugo Gaston	5	7	2
5	(Spain) Bernabé Zapata Miralles	7	5	6

==== Second qualifier ====
First round
2	(Switzerland) Henri Laaksonen	6	6^{5}	6
(Bosnia and Herzegovina) Damir Džumhur	3	7^{7}	1
WC	(Netherlands) Tim van Rijthoven	6	7^{7}
8	(Italy) Salvatore Caruso	4	6^{5}

Qualifying competition
2	(Switzerland) Henri Laaksonen	7^{8}	2	6
WC	(Netherlands) Tim van Rijthoven	6^{6}	6	4

==== Third qualifier ====
First round
3	(France) Corentin Moutet	7^{13}	6
WC	(Netherlands) Jelle Sels	6^{11}	3
Alt	(Netherlands) Jesper de Jong	6^{5}	0
7	(Czech Republic) Jiří Lehečka	7^{7}	6

Qualifying competition
3	(France) Corentin Moutet	4	6	4
7	(Czech Republic) Jiří Lehečka	6	4	6

==== Fourth qualifier ====
First round
4	(Belarus) Egor Gerasimov	6	6
(Germany) Daniel Masur	4	4
(Slovakia) Jozef Kovalík	4	4
6	(Germany) Philipp Kohlschreiber	6	6

Qualifying competition
4	(Belarus) Egor Gerasimov	6	6
6	(Germany) Philipp Kohlschreiber	1	1
