= 2022 ABN AMRO Rotterdam – Doubles =

Doubles
- 2022 ABN AMRO Rotterdam

Final
- Champions: (Netherlands) Robin Haase (Netherlands) Matwé Middelkoop
- Runners-up: (South Africa) Lloyd Harris (Germany) Tim Pütz
- Score: 4–6, 7–6^{(7–5)}, [10–5]

Details
- Draw: 16 (1Q, 2WC)
- Seeds: 4

Events
Singles	Doubles
← 2021 ·	ABN AMRO Rotterdam	· 2023 →

Robin Haase and Matwé Middelkoop defeated Lloyd Harris and Tim Pütz in the final, 4–6, 7–6^{(7–5)}, [10–5], to win the doubles tennis title at the 2022 ABN AMRO Rotterdam. It was their fourth career ATP Tour doubles title as a team, and marked Haase's seventh individual doubles title and Middelkoop's 12th. Harris and Pütz were competing in their first event together.

Nikola Mektić and Mate Pavić were the defending champions, but lost in the first round to Haase and Middelkoop.

== Seeds ==
1. (Croatia) Nikola Mektić / (Croatia) Mate Pavić (first round)
2. (Croatia) Ivan Dodig / (Brazil) Marcelo Melo (first round)
3. (France) Nicolas Mahut / (France) Fabrice Martin (semifinals)
4. (Netherlands) Wesley Koolhof / (United Kingdom) Neal Skupski (semifinals)

== Draw ==
=== Key ===
- Q = Qualifier
- WC = Wild card
- LL = Lucky loser
- Alt = Alternate
- SE = Special exempt
- PR = Protected ranking
- ITF = ITF entry
- JE = Junior exempt
- w/o = Walkover
- r = Retired
- d = Defaulted
- SR = Special ranking

=== Draw ===
First round
1	(Croatia) N Mektić (Croatia) M Pavić	6^{7}	5
WC	(Netherlands) R Haase (Netherlands) M Middelkoop	7^{9}	7
(Belgium) S Gillé (Belgium) J Vliegen	6	6^{2}	[10]
Q	(Netherlands) J de Jong (Netherlands) S Verbeek	4	7^{7}	[8]
3	(France) N Mahut (France) F Martin	6^{4}	6	[10]
(Germany) K Krawietz (Germany) A Mies	7^{7}	2	[7]
(South Africa) R Klaasen (Japan) B McLachlan	6	4	[9]
(Kazakhstan) A Bublik (Russia) A Karatsev	4	6	[11]
(Kazakhstan) A Golubev (France) É Roger-Vasselin	3	4
(India) R Bopanna (Canada) D Shapovalov	6	6
(Russia) K Khachanov (Russia) A Rublev	7	5	[7]
4	(Netherlands) W Koolhof (United Kingdom) N Skupski	5	7	[10]
WC	(Netherlands) T Griekspoor (Netherlands) B van de Zandschulp	3	6^{3}
(South Africa) L Harris (Germany) T Pütz	6	7^{7}
(Canada) F Auger-Aliassime (Poland) H Hurkacz	6	2	[10]
2	(Croatia) I Dodig (Brazil) M Melo	4	6	[7]

Quarterfinals
WC	(Netherlands) R Haase (Netherlands) M Middelkoop	6	3	[10]
(Belgium) S Gillé (Belgium) J Vliegen	4	6	[4]
3	(France) N Mahut (France) F Martin	w/o
(Kazakhstan) A Bublik (Russia) A Karatsev
(India) R Bopanna (Canada) D Shapovalov	4	6	[7]
4	(Netherlands) W Koolhof (United Kingdom) N Skupski	6	3	[10]
(South Africa) L Harris (Germany) T Pütz	6	6
(Canada) F Auger-Aliassime (Poland) H Hurkacz	2	2

Semifinals
WC	(Netherlands) R Haase (Netherlands) M Middelkoop	7^{7}	2	[10]
3	(France) N Mahut (France) F Martin	6^{5}	6	[6]
4	(Netherlands) W Koolhof (United Kingdom) N Skupski	6^{3}	6	[7]
(South Africa) L Harris (Germany) T Pütz	7^{7}	4	[10]

Final
WC	(Netherlands) R Haase (Netherlands) M Middelkoop	4	7^{7}	[10]
(South Africa) L Harris (Germany) T Pütz	6	6^{5}	[5]

== Qualifying ==
=== Seeds ===
1. (Czech Republic) Roman Jebavý / (Spain) David Vega Hernández (first round)
2. (Netherlands) Sander Arends / (Netherlands) David Pel (qualifying competition)

=== Qualifiers ===
1. (Netherlands) Jesper de Jong / (Netherlands) Sem Verbeek

=== Qualifying draw ===
First round
1	(Czech Republic) Roman Jebavý (Spain) David Vega Hernández	6	2	[9]
(Netherlands) Jesper de Jong (Netherlands) Sem Verbeek	3	6	[11]
WC	(Netherlands) Bart Stevens (Netherlands) Tim van Rijthoven	5	4
Alt/2	(Netherlands) Sander Arends (Netherlands) David Pel	7	6

Qualifying competition
(Netherlands) Jesper de Jong (Netherlands) Sem Verbeek	7^{7}	6
Alt/2	(Netherlands) Sander Arends (Netherlands) David Pel	6^{5}	3
