= Matwé Middelkoop =

Dutch tennis player (born 1983)

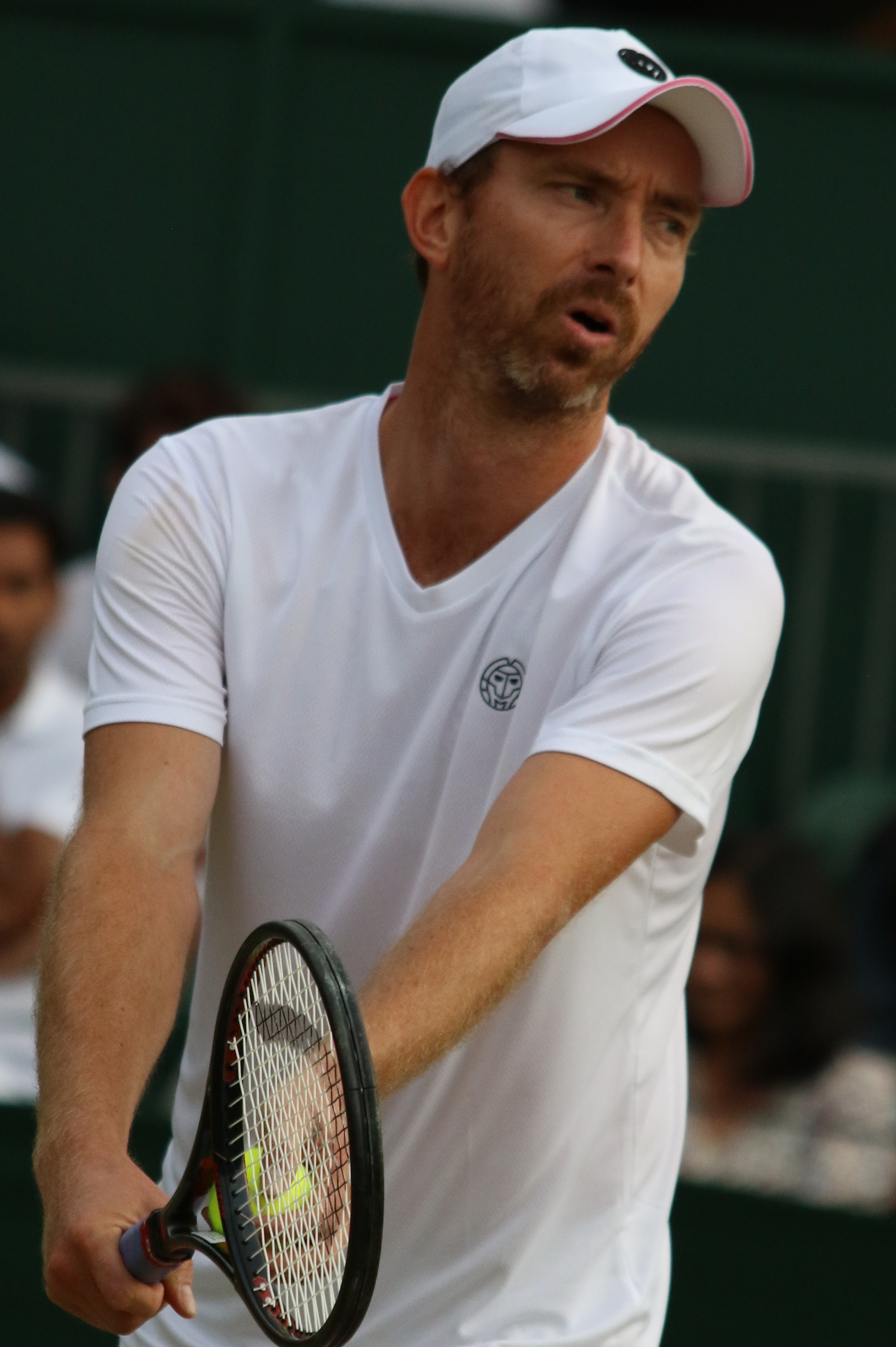
- Middelkoop at the 2019 Wimbledon Championships
- Country (sports): Netherlands
- Residence: Breda, The Netherlands
- Born: 3 September 1983 (age 43) Leerdam, The Netherlands
- Height: 1.91 m (6 ft 3 in)
- Turned pro: 2002
- Retired: July 2025
- Plays: Right-handed (two-handed backhand)
- Prize money: $ 2,212,603

Singles
- Career record: 2–2
- Career titles: 0
- Highest ranking: No. 197 (3 November 2008)

Grand Slam singles results
- Australian Open: Q3 (2008)
- French Open: Q1 (2008)
- Wimbledon: Q2 (2013)
- US Open: Q3 (2011)

Doubles
- Career record: 238–221
- Career titles: 14
- Highest ranking: No. 18 (6 February 2023)

Grand Slam doubles results
- Australian Open: QF (2021)
- French Open: SF (2022, 2023)
- Wimbledon: 2R (2016, 2018, 2021, 2024)
- US Open: QF (2017)

Grand Slam mixed doubles results
- Australian Open: QF (2018)
- French Open: SF (2023)
- Wimbledon: SF (2019, 2023)
- US Open: 1R (2018, 2021, 2022)
- Last updated on: 16 June 2025.

Matwé Middelkoop (Dutch pronunciation: [ˈmɑtʋeː ˈmɪdəlkoːp]; born 3 September 1983) is a Dutch former professional tennis player who specialised in doubles. He won 14 doubles titles on the ATP Tour, most notably the 2022 Rotterdam Open alongside Robin Haase, and reached a career high doubles ranking of world No. 18 on 6 February 2023.

Middelkoop reached the 2022 French Open semifinal in doubles and the 2019 Wimbledon Championships semifinal in mixed doubles, and two more Grand Slam quarterfinals in men's doubles, at the 2017 US Open and at the 2021 Australian Open. In singles, Middelkoop reached his highest ranking of world No. 197 in November 2008. He represented the Netherlands in the Davis Cup from 2009, and held a 10–6 record.

Middelkoop reached 97 doubles finals in his career, with a record of 51 wins and 46 losses. This included a record of 14–19 in ATP finals, 15–16 in ATP Challenger Tour finals and 22–11 in ITF Futures finals. Additionally, he reached 28 career singles finals, with a record of 15 wins and 13 losses, including one ATP Challenger final.

== Singles ==
Middelkoop played most of his singles career on the Futures circuit. All of the singles finals he appeared in have come at the ITF Futures level with the exception of one, when he lost the 2012 The Hague Open Challenger tournament in Scheveningen, Netherlands to Jerzy Janowicz of Poland in straight sets 2–6, 2–6.

Middelkoop made his ATP Tour singles debut in 2008 at the Ordina Open on the grass courts of 's-Hertogenbosch, Netherlands, when he was granted entry into the main draw as a lucky loser. In qualifying, he received a bye in the first round, then advanced through the second round when opponent Robert Lindstedt of Sweden retired in the third set while trailing 6–3, 4–6, 2–3, but was then defeated in the final round by German Benjamin Becker in straight sets 2–6, 4–6. He entered the main draw as a lucky loser recipient after Finland's Jarkko Nieminen withdrew with a right heel injury, however he was promptly defeated by eventual runner-up Marc Gicquel of France again in straight sets 4–6, 1–6.

== Doubles ==
=== 2008: ATP debut in doubles ===
Middelkoop made his ATP Tour doubles debut at the 2008 ABN AMRO World Tennis Tournament held on hardcourts in Rotterdam, Netherlands. He was granted a direct acceptance into the doubles draw alongside compatriot Jesse Huta Galung, however they would be defeated in the first round by second seeds and eventual semifinalists Julian Knowle and Simon Aspelin in straight sets 3–6, 5–7.

=== 2016–2017: Major quarterfinal, Maiden ATP title, three more 250 titles ===
Middelkoop won his maiden ATP tour doubles title at the 2016 Sofia Open on indoor hardcourts in Bulgaria, partnering compatriot Wesley Koolhof. The pair defeated Adil Shamasdin and Philipp Oswald in a third set tiebreaker 5–7, 7–6^{(11–9)}, [10–6], saving two match points in the championship match, to capture the title.

He won his fourth title at the 2017 St. Petersburg Open with Roman Jebavý.

=== 2018–2020: Five more titles & ten finals, Top 30 career-high ===
Middelkoop reached the final of his second ATP 500 event at the 2020 St. Petersburg Open with Marcelo Demoliner where they lost to Jürgen Melzer and Édouard Roger-Vasselin.

=== 2021: Masters semifinal, Three titles, top 30 return ===
The 2021 season was the most successful after the 2018 season on the ATP tour in Middelkoop's professional career. With his partner Marcelo Arévalo, the pair reached the quarterfinals of the 2021 Australian Open and the semifinals of the Italian Open defeating home favorites Fognini/Musetti in the round of 16 and Dutch pair Koolhof/Rojer in the quarterfinals. As a result, he returned to the top 40 in the doubles rankings.

At the 2021 Winston-Salem Open, he won his tenth title partnering Arévalo when they defeated Ivan Dodig and Austin Krajicek in the final. As a result, he reentered the top 30 at a new career-high of World No. 28 on 30 August 2021.

=== 2022: ATP 500 title, French semifinal, top 25, 30th final ===
At the 2022 ABN AMRO World Tennis Tournament he won his first ATP 500 title with Robin Haase. As a result, he reached a career-high ranking of World No. 26 on 14 February 2022.

At the 2022 French Open he reached the semifinals for the first time at a Grand Slam in his career partnering Rohan Bopanna defeating en route the second seeds, former World No. 1 pair and 2021 Wimbledon champions Nikola Mektić/Mate Pavić.

He reached the top 25 on 27 June 2022 at the start of the 2022 Wimbledon Championships.

=== 2023: Top 20, 14th ATP title, second French semifinal ===
He reached the top 20 in doubles at world No. 19 on 30 January 2023.

At the 2023 Open Sud de France reached his thirty first doubles final partnering compatriot Haase. He won his fourteenth title defeating Maxime Cressy/Albano Olivetti. At the 2023 French Open he reached back-to-back semifinals partnering Andreas Mies this time.

=== 2025: Retirement ===
Middelkoop announced his retirement from professional tennis in July 2025.

== ATP Tour finals ==
=== Doubles: 33 (14 titles, 19 runner-ups) ===
Legend Grand Slam tournaments (0–0) ATP World Tour Finals (0–0) ATP World Tour Masters 1000 (0–0) ATP World Tour 500 Series (1–3) ATP World Tour 250 Series (13–16)	Finals by surface Hard (11–8) Clay (3–9) Grass (0–2)	Finals by setting Outdoor (6–13) Indoor (8–6)

Result	W–L	Date	Tournament	Tier	Surface	Partner	Opponents	Score
Win	1–0	Feb 2016	Sofia Open, Bulgaria	250 Series	Hard (i)	(Netherlands) Wesley Koolhof	(Austria) Philipp Oswald (Canada) Adil Shamasdin	5–7, 7–6^{(11–9)}, [10–6]
Win	2–0	Jul 2016	Austrian Open, Austria	250 Series	Clay	(Netherlands) Wesley Koolhof	(Austria) Dennis Novak (Austria) Dominic Thiem	2–6, 6–3, [11–9]
Win	3–0	Jan 2017	Sydney International, Australia	250 Series	Hard	(Netherlands) Wesley Koolhof	(United Kingdom) Jamie Murray (Brazil) Bruno Soares	6–3, 7–5
Loss	3–1	Feb 2017	Rotterdam Open, Netherlands	500 Series	Hard (i)	(Netherlands) Wesley Koolhof	(Croatia) Ivan Dodig (Spain) Marcel Granollers	6–7^{(5–7)}, 3–6
Loss	3–2	Jul 2017	Swedish Open, Sweden	250 Series	Clay	(Netherlands) Sander Arends	(Austria) Julian Knowle (Germany) Philipp Petzschner	2–6, 6–3, [7–10]
Win	4–2	Sep 2017	St. Petersburg Open, Russia	250 Series	Hard (i)	(Czech Republic) Roman Jebavý	(Chile) Julio Peralta (Argentina) Horacio Zeballos	6–4, 6–4
Win	5–2	Jan 2018	Maharashtra Open, India	250 Series	Hard	(Netherlands) Robin Haase	(France) Pierre-Hugues Herbert (France) Gilles Simon	7–6^{(7–5)}, 7–6^{(7–5)}
Win	6–2	Feb 2018	Sofia Open, Bulgaria (2)	250 Series	Hard (i)	(Netherlands) Robin Haase	(Croatia) Nikola Mektić (Austria) Alexander Peya	5–7, 6–4, [10–4]
Loss	6–3	Apr 2018	Hungarian Open, Hungary	250 Series	Clay	(Argentina) Andrés Molteni	(United Kingdom) Dominic Inglot (Croatia) Franko Škugor	7–6^{(10–8)}, 1–6, [8–10]
Loss	6–4	May 2018	Lyon Open, France	250 Series	Clay	(Czech Republic) Roman Jebavý	(Australia) Nick Kyrgios (United States) Jack Sock	5–7, 6–2, [9–11]
Loss	6–5	Jun 2018	Antalya Open, Turkey	250 Series	Grass	(Netherlands) Sander Arends	(Brazil) Marcelo Demoliner (Mexico) Santiago González	5–7, 7–6^{(8–6)}, [8–10]
Win	7–5	Jul 2018	Croatia Open Umag, Croatia	250 Series	Clay	(Netherlands) Robin Haase	(Czech Republic) Roman Jebavý (Czech Republic) Jiří Veselý	6–4, 6–4
Loss	7–6	Sep 2018	St. Petersburg Open, Russia	250 Series	Hard (i)	(Czech Republic) Roman Jebavý	(Italy) Matteo Berrettini (Italy) Fabio Fognini	6–7^{(6–8)}, 6–7^{(4–7)}
Loss	7–7	Jan 2019	Qatar Open, Qatar	250 Series	Hard	(Netherlands) Robin Haase	(Belgium) David Goffin (France) Pierre-Hugues Herbert	7–5, 4–6, [4–10]
Loss	7–8	Feb 2019	Open 13, France	250 Series	Hard (i)	(Japan) Ben McLachlan	(France) Jérémy Chardy (France) Fabrice Martin	3–6, 7–6^{(7–4)}, [3–10]
Loss	7–9	Apr 2019	Grand Prix Hassan II, Morocco	250 Series	Clay	(Denmark) Frederik Nielsen	(Austria) Jürgen Melzer (Croatia) Franko Škugor	4–6, 6–7^{(6–8)}
Loss	7–10	Sep 2019	Zhuhai Championships, China	250 Series	Hard	(Brazil) Marcelo Demoliner	(Belgium) Sander Gillé (Belgium) Joran Vliegen	6–7^{(2–7)}, 6–7^{(4–7)}
Win	8–10	Oct 2019	Kremlin Cup, Russia	250 Series	Hard (i)	(Brazil) Marcelo Demoliner	(Italy) Simone Bolelli (Argentina) Andrés Molteni	6–1, 6–2
Win	9–10	Feb 2020	Córdoba Open, Argentina	250 Series	Clay	(Brazil) Marcelo Demoliner	(Argentina) Leonardo Mayer (Argentina) Andrés Molteni	6–3, 7–6^{(7–4)}
Loss	9–11	Oct 2020	St. Petersburg Open, Russia	500 Series	Hard (i)	(Brazil) Marcelo Demoliner	(Austria) Jürgen Melzer (France) Édouard Roger-Vasselin	2–6, 6–7^{(4–7)}
Loss	9–12	Oct 2020	European Open, Belgium	250 Series	Hard (i)	(India) Rohan Bopanna	(Australia) John Peers (New Zealand) Michael Venus	3–6, 4–6
Loss	9–13	Jul 2021	Austrian Open Kitzbühel, Austria	250 Series	Clay	(Czech Republic) Roman Jebavý	(Austria) Alexander Erler (Austria) Lucas Miedler	5–7, 6–7^{(5–7)}
Win	10–13	Aug 2021	Winston-Salem Open, United States	250 Series	Hard	(El Salvador) Marcelo Arévalo	(Croatia) Ivan Dodig (United States) Austin Krajicek	6–7^{(5–7)}, 7–5, [10–6]
Win	11-13	Oct 2021	Kremlin Cup, Russia	250 Series	Hard (i)	(Finland) Harri Heliövaara	(Bosnia and Herzegovina) Tomislav Brkić (Serbia) Nikola Ćaćić	7–5, 4–6, [11–9]
Win	12–13	Feb 2022	Rotterdam Open, Netherlands	500 Series	Hard (i)	(Netherlands) Robin Haase	(South Africa) Lloyd Harris (Germany) Tim Pütz	4–6, 7–6(7–5), [10–5]
Loss	12–14	May 2022	Geneva Open, Switzerland	250 Series	Clay	(Spain) Pablo Andújar	(Croatia) Nikola Mektić (Croatia) Mate Pavić	6–2, 2–6, [3–10]
Loss	12–15	Jun 2022	Eastbourne International, United Kingdom	250 Series	Grass	(Australia) Luke Saville	(Croatia) Nikola Mektić (Croatia) Mate Pavić	4–6, 2–6
Loss	12–16	Jul 2022	Hamburg European Open, Germany	500 Series	Clay	(India) Rohan Bopanna	(United Kingdom) Lloyd Glasspool (Finland) Harri Heliövaara	2–6, 4–6
Win	13–16	Oct 2022	Tel Aviv Open, Israel	250 Series	Hard (i)	(India) Rohan Bopanna	(Mexico) Santiago González (Argentina) Andrés Molteni	6–2, 6–4
Loss	13–17	Oct 2022	European Open, Belgium	250 Series	Hard (i)	(India) Rohan Bopanna	(Netherlands) Tallon Griekspoor (Netherlands) Botic van de Zandschulp	6–3, 3–6, [5–10]
Win	14–17	Feb 2023	Open Sud de France, France	250 Series	Hard (i)	(Netherlands) Robin Haase	(United States) Maxime Cressy (France) Albano Olivetti	7–6^{(7–4)}, 4–6, [10–6]
Loss	14–18	May 2023	Lyon Open, France	250 Series	Clay	(France) Nicolas Mahut	(United States) Rajeev Ram (United Kingdom) Joe Salisbury	0–6, 3–6
Loss	14–19	Jul 2023	Swiss Open Gstaad, Switzerland	250 Series	Clay	(Brazil) Marcelo Demoliner	(Switzerland) Dominic Stricker (Switzerland) Stan Wawrinka	6-7^{(8–10)}, 2–6

== ATP Challenger and ITF Futures finals ==
=== Singles: 28 (15–13) ===
Legend ATP Challenger (0–1) ITF Futures (15–12)	Finals by surface Hard (2–4) Clay (12–8) Grass (0–0) Carpet (1–1)

Result	W–L	Date	Tournament	Tier	Surface	Opponent	Score
Loss	0–1	Oct 2004	Rwanda F1, Kigali	Futures	Clay	(South Africa) Andrew Anderson	3–6, 6–7^{(3–7)}
Loss	0–2	Jun 2006	Netherlands F1, Meppel	Futures	Clay	(Netherlands) Boy Westerhof	4–6, 6–7^{(5–7)}
Win	1–2	Sep 2006	Netherlands F6, Enschede	Futures	Clay	(Netherlands) Boy Westerhof	7–5, 6–7^{(2–7)}, 6–3
Win	2–2	Jan 2007	France F1, Deauville	Futures	Clay	(Morocco) Rabie Chaki	6–3, 3–6, 7–6^{(7–0)}
Win	3–2	Feb 2007	Spain F6, Cartagena	Futures	Clay	(Spain) Adrián Menéndez Maceiras	7–5, 4–6, 6–0
Loss	3–3	Aug 2007	Netherlands F4, Vlaardingen	Futures	Clay	(Netherlands) Nick van der Meer	6–3, 3–6, 4–6
Loss	3–4	Sep 2007	Bosnia & Herzegovina F5, Mostar	Futures	Clay	(Croatia) Vjekoslav Skenderovic	2–6, 4–6
Win	4–4	Nov 2007	Rwanda F1, Kigali	Futures	Clay	(Lithuania) Gvidas Sabeckis	7–5, 6–3
Win	5–4	Nov 2007	Uganda F1, Kampala	Futures	Clay	(Togo) Komlavi Loglo	6–3, 7–5
Win	6–4	Dec 2007	Sudan F1, Khartoum	Futures	Clay	(Egypt) Sherif Sabry	6–3, 6–2
Win	7–4	Dec 2007	Sudan F2, Khartoum	Futures	Clay	(North Macedonia) Predrag Rusevski	walkover
Win	8–4	Mar 2008	Ivory Coast F2, Abidjan	Futures	Hard	(France) Jérémy Blandin	6–7^{(4–7)}, 6–4, 6–1
Win	9–4	Mar 2010	Switzerland F2, Wetzikon	Futures	Carpet	(Switzerland) Sandro Ehrat	6–3, 6–4
Loss	9–5	May 2010	Italy F10, Cesena	Futures	Clay	(Denmark) Frederik Nielsen	5–7, 7–6^{(7–5)}, 3–3 ret.
Win	10–5	Jun 2010	Netherlands F1, Apeldoorn	Futures	Clay	(France) Mathieu Rodrigues	6–1, 6–4
Win	11–5	Sep 2010	Netherlands F6, Middelburg	Futures	Clay	(Belgium) Niels Desein	7–6^{(7–2)}, 6–2
Loss	11–6	Nov 2010	Dominican Republic F1, Santo Domingo	Futures	Hard	(Dominican Republic) Víctor Estrella Burgos	1–6, 6–2, 1–6
Loss	11–7	Dec 2010	Dominican Republic F3, Santo Domingo	Futures	Hard	(Dominican Republic) Víctor Estrella Burgos	4–6, 2–6
Win	12–7	May 2011	Italy F7, Vicenza	Futures	Clay	(Argentina) Juan-Martín Aranguren	7–5, 2–6, 6–4
Win	13–7	Jul 2011	Belgium F3, Knokke	Futures	Clay	(France) Julien Obry	6–2, 6–3
Win	14–7	Jul 2012	Netherlands F4, Middelburg	Futures	Clay	(Belgium) Niels Desein	4–6, 6–2, 6–3
Loss	14–8	Jul 2012	Scheveningen, Netherlands	Challenger	Clay	(Poland) Jerzy Janowicz	2–6, 2–6
Loss	14–9	Nov 2012	Thailand F4, Phuket	Futures	Hard	(Netherlands) Miliaan Niesten	6–3, 3–6, 4–6
Loss	14–10	Jan 2013	Germany F3, Kaarst	Futures	Carpet	(Slovakia) Miloslav Mečíř	2–6, 6–7^{(3–7)}
Loss	14–11	Jun 2013	Netherlands F3, Breda	Futures	Clay	(Netherlands) Thomas Schoorel	4–6, 4–6
Loss	14–12	Oct 2013	Turkey F42, Antalya	Futures	Hard	(United States) Adam El Mihdawy	1–2 ret.
Win	15–12	Oct 2014	Egypt F29, Sharm El Sheikh	Futures	Hard	(Egypt) Mohamed Safwat	7–5, 2–6, 6–3
Loss	15–13	Nov 2014	Morocco F4, Casablanca	Futures	Clay	(Spain) Gerard Granollers Pujol	4–6, 2–6

=== Doubles: 64 (37–27) ===
Legend ATP Challenger (15–16) ITF Futures (22–11)	Finals by surface Hard (14–7) Clay (22–18) Grass (1–0) Carpet (0–2)

Result	W–L	Date	Tournament	Tier	Surface	Partner	Opponents	Score
Loss	0–1	Sep 2003	Kenya F1, Mombasa	Futures	Hard	(Netherlands) Bart Beks	(South Africa) W-P Meyer (South Africa) Wesley Whitehouse	3–6, 6–7^{(3–7)}
Loss	0–2	Feb 2004	Canada F2, Edmonton	Futures	Hard	(Netherlands) Paul Logtens	(United States) Ryan Haviland (United States) K.J. Hippensteel	3–6, 6–4, 6–7^{(5–7)}
Win	1–2	Oct 2004	Rwanda F1, Kigali	Futures	Clay	(New Zealand) Adam Thompson	(South Africa) Andrew Anderson (South Africa) Paul Anderson	6–2, 2–6, 6–4
Win	2–2	Nov 2004	Thailand F3, Pattaya	Futures	Hard	(United States) David Martin	(Austria) Martin Slanar (Austria) Herbert Wiltschnig	3–6, 6–4, 7–5
Win	3–2	Jun 2005	France F8, Blois	Futures	Clay	(Netherlands) Bart Beks	(France) Stéphane Robert (Spain) E Carril-Caso	4–6, 6–2, 6–3
Win	4–2	Jul 2005	Valladolid, Spain	Challenger	Hard	(Austria) Alexander Peya	(Netherlands) Jasper Smit (Belgium) Stefan Wauters	7–6^{(9–7)}, 6–3
Loss	4–3	Oct 2005	Barcelona II, Spain	Challenger	Clay	(Netherlands) Bart Beks	(Spain) David Marrero (Spain) Gabriel Trujillo Soler	4–6, 4–6
Loss	4–4	Jan 2006	Germany F4, Kaarst	Futures	Carpet	(Netherlands) Bart Beks	(Germany) Bastian Knittel (Germany) Ralph Grambow	6–7^{(4–7)}, 6–7^{(5–7)}
Loss	4–5	Mar 2006	Portugal F1, Faro	Futures	Hard	(Netherlands) Bart Beks	(Italy) Alessandro da Col (Spain) Marcel Granollers	4–6, 6–3, 2–6
Loss	4–6	Aug 2006	Netherlands F4, Vlaardingen	Futures	Clay	(Netherlands) Romano Frantzen	(Netherlands) Martijn van Haasteren (Netherlands) Michel Koning	5–7, 5–7
Win	5–6	Nov 2006	Tunisia F5, Monastir	Futures	Hard	(Netherlands) Michel Koning	(Romania) Adrian Cruciat (Romania) A-V Gavrila	6–1, 6–1
Win	6–6	Apr 2007	Chiasso, Swsitzerland	Challenger	Clay	(Netherlands) Bart Beks	(Romania) Teodor-Dacian Crăciun (Romania) Victor Crivoi	7–6^{(7–2)}, 7–5
Win	7–6	Sep 2007	Netherlands F5, Enschede	Futures	Clay	(Netherlands) Michel Koning	(France) Augustin Gensse (United States) Chris Wettengel	6–3, 6–2
Loss	7–7	Sep 2007	Bosnia & Herzegovina F5, Mostar	Futures	Clay	(Italy) Francesco Piccari	(Slovenia) Blaž Kavčič (Czech Republic) Jaroslav Pospíšil	6–4, 3–6, [5–10]
Win	8–7	Nov 2007	Rwanda F1, Kigali	Futures	Clay	(Lithuania) Gvidas Sabeckis	(Nigeria) Lawal Shehu (Nigeria) Candy Idoko	7–6^{(9–7)}, 6–4
Win	9–7	Nov 2007	Uganda F1, Kampala	Futures	Clay	(Lithuania) Gvidas Sabeckis	(Togo) Komlavi Loglo (Russia) Alexei Filenkov	6–1, 6–4
Loss	9–8	Mar 2008	Ivory Coast F1, Abidjan	Futures	Hard	(Netherlands) Miliaan Niesten	(Russia) Ilya Belyaev (Russia) Sergei Krotiouk	6–2, 3–6, [5–10]
Loss	9–9	Jun 2008	Alessandria, Italy	Challenger	Clay	(Netherlands) Melle van Gemerden	(Italy) Flavio Cipolla (Italy) Simone Vagnozzi	6–3, 1–6, [4–10]
Win	10–9	Jun 2008	Netherlands F3, Breda	Futures	Clay	(Netherlands) Jesse Huta Galung	(Belgium) Niels Desein (Belgium) Jeroen Masson	3–6, 6–3, [10–8]
Loss	10–10	Jul 2008	Scheveningen, Netherlands	Challenger	Clay	(Netherlands) Melle van Gemerden	(Australia) Rameez Junaid (Germany) Philipp Marx	7–5, 2–6, [6–10]
Loss	10–11	Jul 2008	Rimini, Italy	Challenger	Clay	(Romania) Cătălin-Ionuț Gârd	(Italy) Leonardo Azzaro (Italy) Marco Crugnola	1–6, 1–6
Loss	10–12	Sep 2008	Alphen aan den Rijn, Netherlands	Challenger	Clay	(Netherlands) Bart Beks	(Australia) Rameez Junaid (Germany) Philipp Marx	3–6, 2–6
Loss	10–13	Jun 2009	Netherlands F3, Rotterdam	Futures	Clay	(Netherlands) Miliaan Niesten	(New Zealand) José Statham (United States) Rylan Rizza	3–6, 6–7^{(4–7)}
Win	11–13	Feb 2010	Azerbaijan F1, Baku	Futures	Hard	(Romania) Petru-Alexandru Luncanu	(China) Zhe Li (China) Gong Mao-xin	6–7^{(7–9)}, 6–3, [12–10]
Win	12–13	Feb 2010	Azerbaijan F2, Baku	Futures	Hard	(Netherlands) Antal van der Duim	(China) Zhe Li (China) Di Wu	7–6^{(10–8)}, 7–5
Win	13–13	Jun 2010	Netherlands F2, Alkmaar	Futures	Clay	(Netherlands Antilles) Martijn van Haasteren	(Finland) Timo Nieminen (Czech Republic) Michal Schmid	7–6^{(10–8)}, 6–4
Win	14–13	Jul 2010	Netherlands F4, Breda	Futures	Clay	(Netherlands) Thomas Schoorel	(Uruguay) Marcel Felder (Ukraine) Aleksandr Agafonov	4–6, 6–3, [10–6]
Loss	14–14	Sep 2010	Rwanda F1, Kigali	Futures	Clay	(Romania) Bogdan-Victor Leonte	(Russia) Stanislav Vovk (Russia) Alexei Filenkov	6–2, 4–6, [11–13]
Win	15–14	May 2011	Italy F7, Vicenza	Futures	Clay	(Serbia) Ivan Bjelica	(Argentina) Juan-Martín Aranguren (Argentina) Alejandro Fabbri	6–4, 6–4
Loss	15–15	Sep 2011	Alphen aan den Rijn, Netherlands	Challenger	Clay	(Netherlands) Igor Sijsling	(Netherlands) Thiemo de Bakker (Netherlands) Antal van der Duim	4–6, 7–6^{(7–4)}, [6–10]
Loss	15–16	Sep 2011	Banja Luka, Bosnia & Herzegovina	Challenger	Clay	(Czech Republic) Jan Mertl	(Spain) Rubén Ramírez Hidalgo (Italy) Marco Crugnola	6–7^{(3–7)}, 6–3, [8–10]
Win	16–16	Jul 2012	Netherlands F3, Breda	Futures	Clay	(Netherlands) Miliaan Niesten	(Germany) Jan-Lennard Struff (Germany) Patrick Pradella	6–2, 6–4
Win	17–16	Nov 2012	Thailand F4, Phuket	Futures	Hard	(Netherlands) Miliaan Niesten	(France) Mick Lescure (Algeria) Mehdi Bouras	6–3, 6–0
Loss	17–17	Sep 2013	Spain F32, Sevilla	Futures	Clay	(India) Ramkumar Ramanathan	(Spain) Eduard Esteve Lobato (Spain) Oriol Roca Batalla	2–6, 3–6
Win	18–17	Oct 2013	Turkey F42, Antalya	Futures	Hard	(Slovakia) Filip Horansky	(Slovakia) Adrian Partl (Ukraine) Danylo Kalenichenko	6–4, 6–3
Win	19–17	Jul 2014	Scheveningen, Netherlands	Challenger	Clay	(Netherlands) Boy Westerhof	(Austria) Martin Fischer (Netherlands) Jesse Huta Galung	6–4, 3–6, [10–6]
Win	20–17	Aug 2014	Netherlands F6, Rotterdam	Futures	Clay	(Netherlands) Stephan Fransen	(Austria) Marc Rath (Austria) Nicolas Reissig	6–1, 6–2
Win	21–17	Oct 2014	Egypt F28, Sharm El Sheikh	Futures	Hard	(Egypt) Mohamed Safwat	(Egypt) Sherif Sabry (Czech Republic) Libor Salaba	6–3, 6–4
Win	22–17	Oct 2014	Egypt F29, Sharm El Sheikh	Futures	Hard	(Egypt) Mohamed Safwat	(Poland) Jan Zieliński (Czech Republic) Libor Salaba	7–6^{(7–1)}, 6–3
Win	23–17	Nov 2014	Morocco F4, Casablanca	Futures	Clay	(Czech Republic) Dušan Lojda	(Morocco) Yassine Idmbarek (Morocco) Mehdi Jdi	6–1, 6–2
Loss	23–18	Jan 2015	Germany F3, Kaarst	Futures	Carpet	(Netherlands) Wesley Koolhof	(Netherlands) Sander Arends (Poland) Adam Majchrowicz	3–6, 4–6
Win	24–18	Feb 2015	France F3, Feucherolles	Futures	Hard	(Netherlands) Wesley Koolhof	(Belgium) Maxime Authom (Belgium) Yannick Mertens	6–3, 6–4
Win	25–18	Feb 2015	Glasgow, United Kingdom	Challenger	Hard	(Netherlands) Wesley Koolhof	(Ukraine) Sergey Bubka (Kazakhstan) Aleksandr Nedovyesov	6–1, 6–4
Loss	25–19	Apr 2015	Le Gosier, Guadeloupe	Challenger	Hard	(Netherlands) Wesley Koolhof	(Netherlands) Antal van der Duim (United States) James Cerretani	1–6, 3–6
Win	26–19	May 2015	Turin, Italy	Challenger	Clay	(Netherlands) Wesley Koolhof	(Croatia) Dino Marcan (Croatia) Antonio Šančić	4–6, 6–3, [10–5]
Win	27–19	Jul 2015	Marburg, Germany	Challenger	Clay	(Netherlands) Wesley Koolhof	(Germany) Tobias Kamke (Germany) Simon Stadler	6–1, 7–5
Loss	27–20	Aug 2015	Liberec, Czech Republic	Challenger	Clay	(Netherlands) Wesley Koolhof	(Chile) Hans Podlipnik Castillo (Slovakia) Andrej Martin	5–7, 7–6^{(7–3)}, [5–10]
Win	28–20	Aug 2015	Prague, Czech Republic	Challenger	Clay	(Netherlands) Wesley Koolhof	(Belarus) Sergey Betov (Russia) Mikhail Elgin	6–4, 3–6, [10–7]
Loss	28–21	Aug 2015	Meerbusch, Germany	Challenger	Clay	(Netherlands) Wesley Koolhof	(Australia) Rameez Junaid (Germany) Dustin Brown	4–6, 5–7
Win	29–21	Aug 2015	Netherlands F6, Rotterdam	Futures	Clay	(Netherlands) Wesley Koolhof	(Germany) Oscar Otte (Germany) Matthias Wunner	6–3, 6–3
Win	30–21	Sep 2015	Seville, Spain	Challenger	Clay	(Netherlands) Wesley Koolhof	(Italy) Marco Bortolotti (Poland) Kamil Majchrzak	7–6^{(7–5)}, 6–4
Win	31–21	Sep 2015	Trnava, Slovakia	Challenger	Clay	(Netherlands) Wesley Koolhof	(Poland) Kamil Majchrzak (France) Stéphane Robert	6–4, 6–2
Loss	31–22	Oct 2015	Rennes, France	Challenger	Hard	(Netherlands) Wesley Koolhof	(Italy) Andrea Arnaboldi (Croatia) Antonio Šančić	4–6, 6–2, [12–14]
Win	32–22	Oct 2015	Brest, France	Challenger	Hard	(Netherlands) Wesley Koolhof	(United Kingdom) Ken Skupski (United Kingdom) Neal Skupski	3–6, 6–4, [10–6]
Win	33–22	Jan 2016	Bangkok, Thailand	Challenger	Hard	(Netherlands) Wesley Koolhof	(Germany) Gero Kretschmer (Germany) Alexander Satschko	6–3, 7–6^{(7–1)}
Win	34–22	Jun 2016	Ilkley, United Kingdom	Challenger	Grass	(Netherlands) Wesley Koolhof	(Brazil) Marcelo Demoliner (Pakistan) Aisam Qureshi	7–6^{(7–5)}, 0–6, [10–8]
Win	35–22	Jul 2016	Scheveningen, Netherlands	Challenger	Clay	(Netherlands) Wesley Koolhof	(Netherlands) Tallon Griekspoor (Netherlands) Tim van Rijthoven	6–1, 3–6, [13–11]
Loss	35–23	Nov 2016	Brescia, Italy	Challenger	Hard	(Netherlands) Wesley Koolhof	(Russia) Alexander Kudryavtsev (Russia) Mikhail Elgin	6–7^{(4–7)}, 3–6
Win	36–23	Nov 2016	Andria, Italy	Challenger	Hard	(Netherlands) Wesley Koolhof	(Czech Republic) Roman Jebavý (Czech Republic) Zdeněk Kolář	6–3, 6–3
Win	37–23	May 2017	Aix En Provence, France	Challenger	Clay	(Netherlands) Wesley Koolhof	(Germany) Andre Begemann (France) Jérémy Chardy	2–6, 6–4, [16–14]
Loss	37–24	Aug 2017	Cordenons, Italy	Challenger	Clay	(Slovakia) Igor Zelenay	(Czech Republic) Roman Jebavý (Czech Republic) Zdeněk Kolář	2–6, 3–6
Loss	37–25	Sep 2019	Szczecin, Poland	Challenger	Clay	(Chile) Hans Podlipnik Castillo	(Argentina) Andrés Molteni (Argentina) Guido Andreozzi	4–6, 3–6
Loss	37–26	May 2024	Francavilla al Mare, Italy	Challenger	Clay	(Netherlands) Sander Arends	(France) Theo Arribage (Romania) Victor Vlad Cornea	6–7_{(1–7)}, 6–7_{(7–9)}
Loss	37–27	Jun 2024	Prostějov, Czech Republic	Challenger	Clay	(Austria) Philipp Oswald	Ivan Liutarevich (Spain) Sergio Martos Gornés	1–6, 4–6

== Performance timelines ==
Key
W	F	SF	QF	#R	RR	Q#	P#	DNQ	A	Z#	PO	G	S	B	NMS	NTI	P	NH

(W) winner; (F) finalist; (SF) semifinalist; (QF) quarterfinalist; (#R) rounds 4, 3, 2, 1; (RR) round-robin stage; (Q#) qualification round; (P#) preliminary round; (DNQ) did not qualify; (A) absent; (Z#) Davis/Fed Cup Zonal Group (with number indication) or (PO) play-off; (G) gold, (S) silver or (B) bronze Olympic/Paralympic medal; (NMS) not a Masters tournament; (NTI) not a Tier I tournament; (P) postponed; (NH) not held; (SR) strike rate (events won / competed); (W–L) win–loss record.
To avoid confusion and double counting, these charts are updated at the conclusion of a tournament or when the player's participation has ended.

=== Singles ===
Tournament	2005	2006	2007	2008	2009	2010	2011	2012	2013	SR	W–L
Grand Slam tournaments
Australian Open	Q1	A	A	Q3	Q2	A	Q1	A	Q1	0 / 0	0–0
French Open	A	A	A	Q1	A	A	A	A	A	0 / 0	0–0
Wimbledon	A	A	A	A	A	A	A	A	Q2	0 / 0	0–0
US Open	A	A	A	Q2	A	Q1	Q3	Q2	A	0 / 0	0–0
Win–loss	0–0	0–0	0–0	0–0	0–0	0–0	0–0	0–0	0–0	0 / 0	0–0

=== Doubles ===
Tournament	2008	...	2015	2016	2017	2018	2019	2020	2021	2022	2023	2024	2025	SR	W–L	Win %
Grand Slam tournaments
Australian Open	A		A	2R	2R	1R	1R	1R	QF	1R	3R	1R	A	0 / 9	7–9	44%
French Open	A		A	1R	1R	2R	2R	1R	3R	SF	SF	1R	A	0 / 9	12–8	60%
Wimbledon	A		Q1	2R	1R	2R	1R	NH	2R	1R	1R	2R	A	0 / 8	4–8	33%
US Open	A		A	1R	QF	3R	1R	2R	1R	1R	2R	2R	A	0 / 9	8–9	47%
Win–loss	0–0		0–0	2–4	4–4	4–4	1–4	1–3	6–3	4–4	7–4	2–4	0–0	0 / 35	31–34	48%
ATP World Tour Masters 1000
Indian Wells Masters	A		A	A	A	A	A	NH	2R	1R	1R	A	A	0 / 3	1–3	25%
Miami Open	A		A	A	A	1R	2R	NH	A	1R	2R	A	A	0 / 4	2–4	33%
Monte-Carlo Masters	A		A	A	A	A	1R	NH	A	A	1R	A	A	0 / 2	0–2	0%
Madrid Open	A		A	A	A	A	1R	NH	A	A	2R	A	A	0 / 2	1–2	33%
Italian Open	A		A	A	A	A	2R	A	SF	2R	1R	A	A	0 / 4	5–4	56%
Canadian Open	A		A	A	A	2R	A	NH	QF	2R	A	A	A	0 / 3	4–3	57%
Cincinnati Masters	A		A	A	A	2R	A	A	1R	A	A	A	A	0 / 2	1–2	33%
Shanghai Masters	A		A	A	A	1R	A	NH			1R	A	A	0 / 2	0–2	0%
Paris Masters	A		A	A	1R	1R	A	2R	A	QF	1R	A	A	0 / 5	2–5	29%
Win–loss	0–0		0–0	0–0	0–1	2–5	2–4	1–1	6–4	3–6	2–7	0–0	0–0	0 / 29	16–28	36%
National representation
Davis Cup	A		PO	Z1	PO	PO	A	A	Z1	QF	RR	A	A	0 / 2	8–5	62%
Career statistics
	2008	...	2015	2016	2017	2018	2019	2020	2021	2022	2023	2024	2025	Career		
Tournaments	1		3	18	24	29	27	15	29	30	32	19	6	233		
Titles	0		0	2	2	3	1	1	2	2	1	0	0	14		
Finals	0		0	2	4	7	5	3	3	6	2	0	0	32		
Overall win–loss	0–1		3–3	14–17	24–22	40–26	26–26	17–14	31–26	35–29	29-31	16–19	2–6	238–221		
Year-end ranking	166		66	57	36	36	54	46	30	22	42	82	222	51.85%		

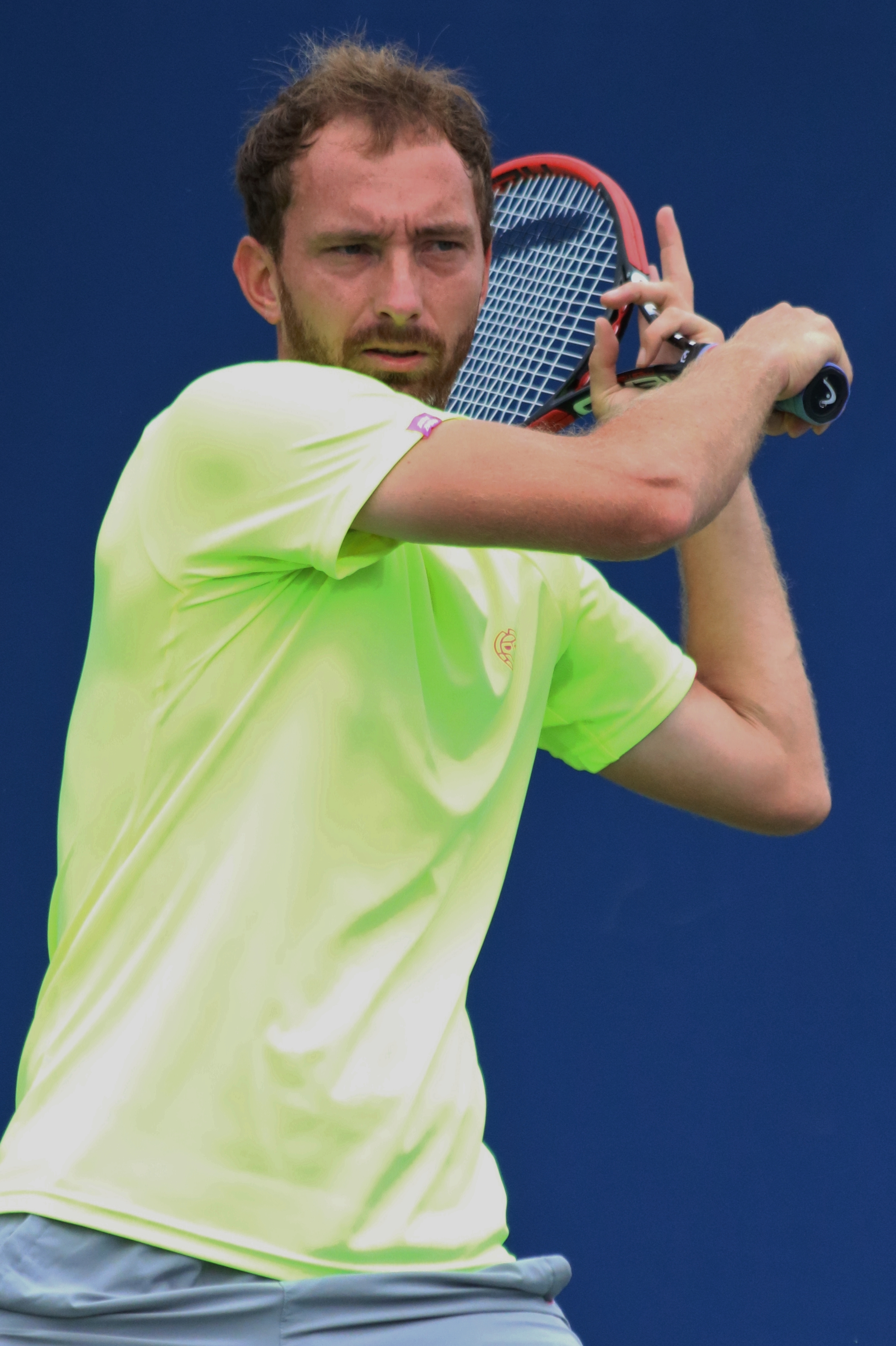
Middelkoop, 2016

=== Mixed doubles ===
Tournament	2016	2017	2018	2019	2020	2021	2022	2023	SR	W–L	Win %
Grand Slam tournaments
Australian Open	A	A	QF	2R	A	1R	2R	1R	0 / 5	4–5	44%
French Open	A	A	QF	A	NH	A	2R	SF	0 / 3	6–3	67%
Wimbledon	2R	A	3R	SF	NH	1R	2R	SF	0 / 6	10–6	63%
US Open	A	A	1R	A	NH	1R	1R	A	0 / 3	0–3	0%
Win–loss	1–1	0–0	5–4	5–2	0–0	0–3	3–4	6–3	0 / 17	21–17	55%
