= Maxime Cressy =

American tennis player (born 1997)

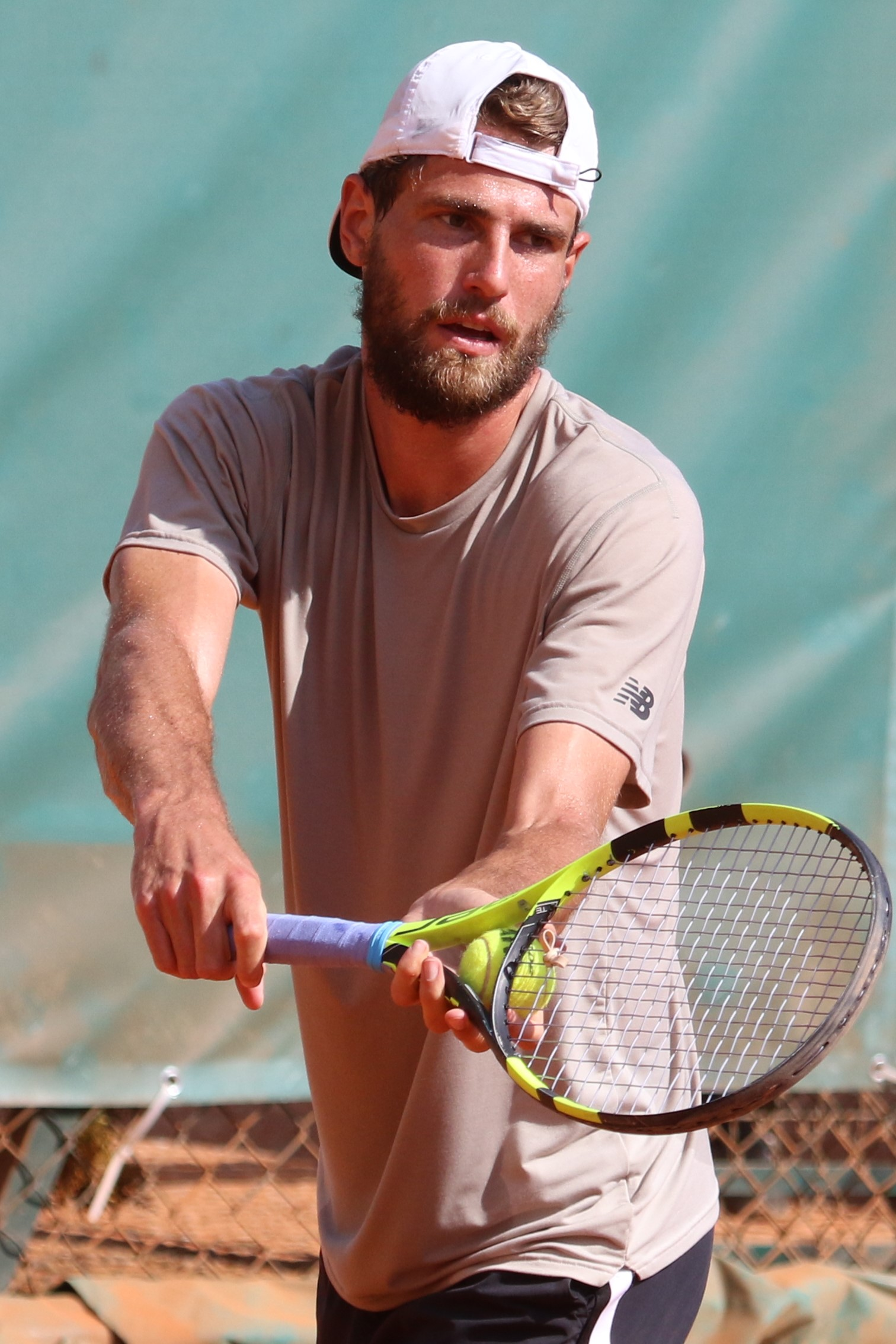
- Cressy at the 2023 Monte-Carlo Masters
- Country (sports): France (2016–2018); United States (2018–present)
- Residence: Hermosa Beach, California, U.S.
- Born: 8 May 1997 (age 29) Paris, France
- Height: 2.01 m (6 ft 7 in)
- Turned pro: 2019
- Plays: Right-handed (two-handed backhand)
- College: UCLA
- Coach: Juanjo Climent
- Prize money: US$ 2,898,405

Singles
- Career record: 43–58
- Career titles: 1
- Highest ranking: No. 31 (August 8, 2022)

Grand Slam singles results
- Australian Open: 4R (2022)
- French Open: 1R (2022, 2023)
- Wimbledon: 2R (2022)
- US Open: 2R (2020, 2021)

Doubles
- Career record: 20–20
- Career titles: 1
- Highest ranking: No. 64 (May 8, 2023)

Grand Slam doubles results
- Australian Open: 1R (2023)
- French Open: 3R (2022)
- Wimbledon: 1R (2022, 2023)
- US Open: 1R (2019, 2023)
- Last updated on: 28 July 2025.

Maxime Cressy (born May 8, 1997) is a French-American inactive professional tennis player. He has a career-high singles ranking of world No. 31 by the ATP, achieved on 8 August 2022. He has been ranked as high as world No. 64 in doubles, achieved on 8 May 2023. Cressy has won one title on the ATP Tour and four singles titles and two doubles titles on the ATP Challenger Tour. Before 2018, he played for his country of birth, France.

== Early life and Juniors ==
Maxime Cressy was born the youngest of three boys in Paris to a French father, Gérard, and an American mother, Leslie. She is a former university volleyball player at the University of Southern California and helped the team win two NCAA championships. He has two brothers.

From 2009 to 2013, he trained at the Centre de ressources, d'expertise et de performance sportives de Provence-Alpes-Côte d'Azur in Saint-Raphaël, on the French Riviera, one of the most prominent training centers for tennis players in France. In 2014, he moved to the United States, where he joined a Californian academy. He did school at home at the French National Centre for Distance Education (CNED), where he had a French Baccalauréat.

He made his debut in 2016 and won the Tallahassee Futures in December 2018. The following week he began representing the United States.

== College career ==
On May 25, 2019, he and Keegan Smith won the 2019 NCAA tennis doubles championship at University of California, Los Angeles (UCLA).

== Professional career ==
=== 2019–20: Grand Slam debut in doubles and singles, first win ===
Cressy made his Grand Slam main draw debut at the 2020 US Open as a wildcard entrant where he reached the second round after defeating Jozef Kovalík. He lost in the second round to fourth seed Stefanos Tsitsipas.

=== 2021: Top 150 debut ===
He qualified for the 2021 Australian Open and reached the second round by defeating Taro Daniel. However, he lost in the second round to sixth seed Alexander Zverev.

After qualifying for the main draw at the 2021 US Open, Cressy won a five-set match with a fifth set tiebreak against ninth seed and two-time US Open semifinalist Pablo Carreño Busta, after coming back from two sets to love down to win in a tiebreak, saving four match points in the process.

Cressy then qualified for the main draw at the 2021 BNP Paribas Open. He defeated Laslo Djere in the first round before falling to 11th seed Diego Schwartzman in 3 sets. Cressy served for the match against Schwartzman in the third set, but could not convert two match points. He reached the final in the 2021 Challenger Eckental where he lost to German Daniel Masur. As a result he hit a new career-high of world No. 128 on 8 November 2021.

=== 2022: First ATP title, Major fourth round, top 35 ===
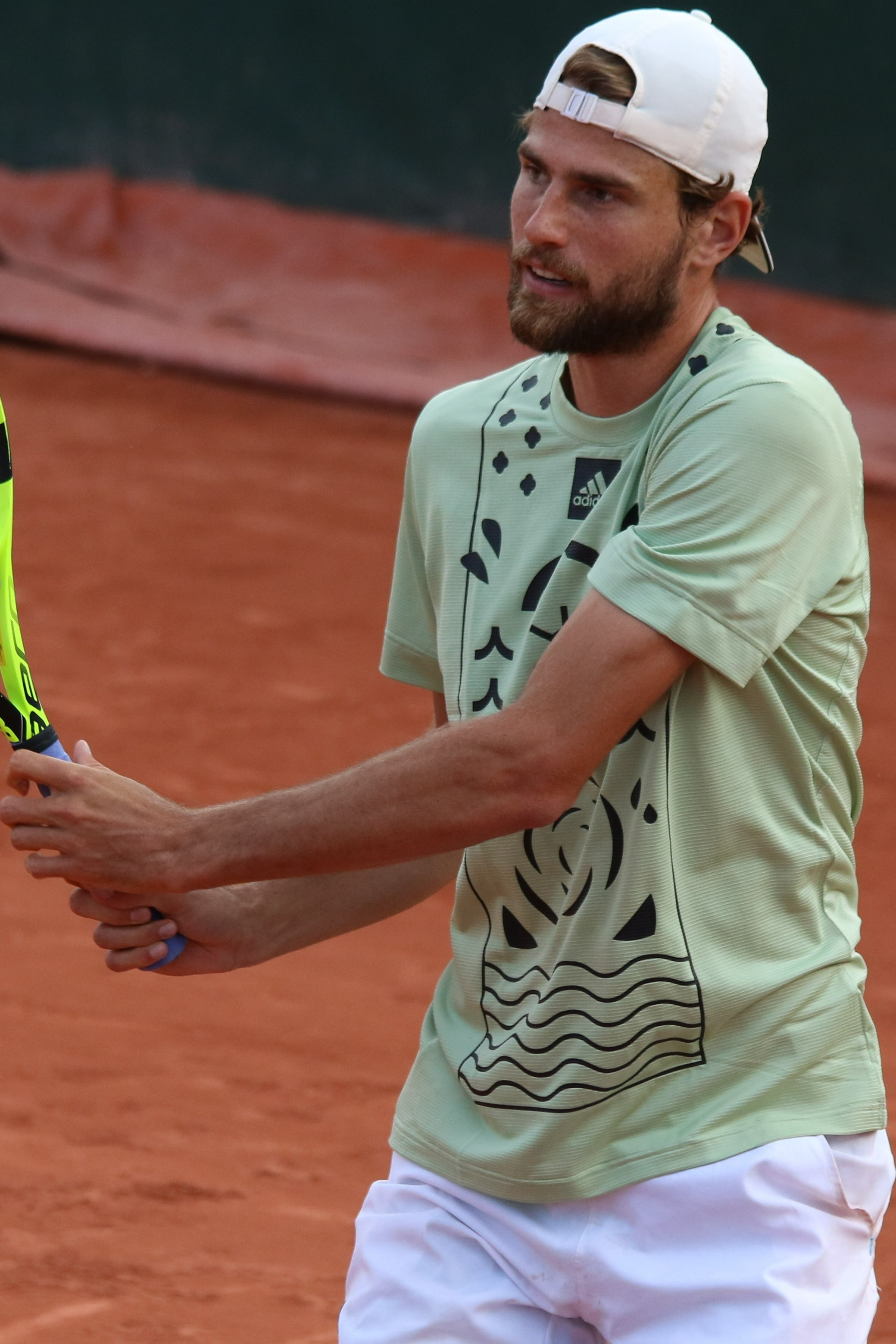
Cressy at the 2022 French Open

Cressy started his 2022 season at the first edition of the Melbourne Summer Set 1. Getting past qualifying, he saved two match points in the second round to beat second seed, world No. 26, and compatriot, Reilly Opelka. He defeated Jaume Munar in the quarterfinals to reach the semifinals of an ATP tournament for the first time. He then defeated third seed and world No. 28, Grigor Dimitrov, in the semifinals to reach his first ATP Tour final. He lost in the final to top seed and world No. 6, Rafael Nadal. Despite losing in the final, he reached a career-high of world No. 70 on January 17, 2022. At the Sydney Classic, he reached the quarterfinals where he fell to third seed, world No. 26, and 2017 finalist, Dan Evans. Cressy qualified for direct entry at the Australian Open after the withdrawal of Dominic Thiem. He defeated 22nd seed, world No. 25, and compatriot, John Isner, in five sets with three tiebreaks in the first round for his second win at this Grand Slam. He advanced to the third round of a Grand Slam for the first time in his career after defeating qualifier, Tomáš Macháč, in the second round in four sets. He then beat Australian wildcard, Christopher O'Connell, in the third round to progress to the fourth round for the first time at any Major. As a result he made his top 60 debut in the rankings at world No. 59 on January 31, 2022. Cressy would lose in the fourth round to second seed, last year finalist, and eventual finalist, Daniil Medvedev.

Seeded sixth at the first edition of the Dallas Open, Cressy lost in the first round to qualifier Jurij Rodionov. Seeded eighth at the Delray Beach Open, he was defeated in the first round by John Millman in three tiebreaker sets. In March, he competed at the BNP Paribas Open in Indian Wells. He was beaten in the first round by qualifier and compatriot, Christopher Eubanks.

At the 2022 Eastbourne International he reached his second final after defeating leading British player Jack Draper. En route to the final, he defeated World No. 12 and top seed Cameron Norrie. As a result he moved into the top 50 in the singles rankings.

On his debut at the 2022 Wimbledon Championships, he defeated World No. 9 and sixth seed Félix Auger-Aliassime for his first top-10 win.

He won his first ATP Tour title at the 2022 Hall of Fame Open in Newport, Rhode Island. Seeded fourth, he reached his third final of the season and in his career after defeating second seed John Isner. He would go on to win the title after defeating third seed Alexander Bublik in the final, coming back from a set and a break down. As a result he reached a new career-high of No. 33 on 18 July 2022.

=== 2023–25: ATP 500 doubles title, back injury and hiatus ===
Cressy started his season at the Adelaide International 1. He lost in the first round to Australian wildcard Thanasi Kokkinakis. At the 2023 Australian Open, he was defeated in the second round by ninth seed and world No. 10 Holger Rune.

In February, Cressy played at the 2023 Open Sud de France. He defeated seventh seed Emil Ruusuvuori in the second round. In the quarterfinals, he defeated third seed and world No. 23 Borna Ćorić. In the semifinals, he upset top seed and world No. 9 Holger Rune to reach his fourth ATP singles final. He lost in the final to second seed and world No. 17 Jannik Sinner. In doubles, he and his partner Albano Olivetti made it to the final; however, they lost to Robin Haase and Matwé Middelkoop. In Rotterdam, he was defeated in the second round by world No. 25 Alex de Minaur. Seeded fifth at the 2023 Open 13 Provence, he lost in the second round to eventual finalist Benjamin Bonzi. At the 2023 Dubai Championships, he fell in his first-round match to fourth seed and world No. 9 Félix Auger-Aliassime in three sets. In doubles, he won his first ATP doubles title and first on the 500-level with Fabrice Martin, defeating third seeds Harri Heliövaara and Lloyd Glasspool. As a result, his doubles ranking moved 45 positions up into the top 75. Seeded 32nd at the 2023 BNP Paribas Open in Indian Wells, he lost in the second round to qualifier Alejandro Tabilo. Seeded 30th in Miami, he was defeated in the second round by Dušan Lajović.

Cressy started his clay court season at the 2023 Grand Prix Hassan II in Marrakesh. Seeded fifth, he lost in the first round to eventual champion Roberto Carballés Baena in three sets. Seeded fifth in doubles with Albano Olivetti, they reached the semifinals where they lost to third seeds Alexander Erler and Lucas Miedler. In Monte-Carlo, he was beaten in the first round by world No. 22 Matteo Berrettini. In Madrid, he pushed 2013 finalist and three-time Grand Slam champion Stan Wawrinka in the first round to three sets, but ended up losing the match. At the 2023 Italian Open, he lost in the first round to Guido Pella.

Cressy started his grass court season at the 2023 Libéma Open. Seeded eighth, he lost in the first round to Marc-Andrea Hüsler. In Queens, he lost in the first round to second seed and world No. 6 Holger Rune in straight sets despite leading 5-2 in the first set. He lost also in the first round at the 2023 Wimbledon Championships to Laslo Djere in four sets with four tiebreaks. As a result of poor form and multiple first round losses, he dropped out of the top 100 in singles on 17 July 2024. At the 2023 Hall of Fame Open where he was the defending champion, Cressy was defeated by eventual finalist Alex Michelsen. In September 2023, Cressy won the 2023 Open de Rennes, his first title on the ATP Challenger Tour in two years, defeating Benjamin Bonzi in the final. He dropped out of the top 180 at world No. 186 on 1 July 2024. At Wimbledon he reached the third qualifying round but lost to Felipe Meligeni Alves in five sets.

Ranked No. 180, at the 2024 Hall of Fame Open in Newport, Rhode Island, he recorded his first ATP win over Radu Albot in a year, since July 2023 in Atlanta. He also qualified for the main draw of the Citi Open in Washington, defeating two Australians Tristan Schoolkate and Marc Polmans. At the 2024 US Open he lost to Jan Choinski in the last round of qualifying on three sets with a supertiebreak in the third, having three match points.

On 30 July 2025, having not won an ATP main-draw match since June 2024 and subsequently dropping to world No. 681, Cressy announced he had "decided to step away from the Tour" due to "severe lower back pain" which had hampered him since 2023.

== Playing style ==
Cressy is a big server who plays a predominantly serve-and-volley style in his service games. His second serve is nearly as fast as, and sometimes faster than, his first serve. He has an aggressive return of serve. He has a good forehand and backhand but is most dangerous when he is chipping-and-charging and volleying.

== Performance timelines ==
Key
W	F	SF	QF	#R	RR	Q#	P#	DNQ	A	Z#	PO	G	S	B	NMS	NTI	P	NH

(W) winner; (F) finalist; (SF) semifinalist; (QF) quarterfinalist; (#R) rounds 4, 3, 2, 1; (RR) round-robin stage; (Q#) qualification round; (P#) preliminary round; (DNQ) did not qualify; (A) absent; (Z#) Davis/Fed Cup Zonal Group (with number indication) or (PO) play-off; (G) gold, (S) silver or (B) bronze Olympic/Paralympic medal; (NMS) not a Masters tournament; (NTI) not a Tier I tournament; (P) postponed; (NH) not held; (SR) strike rate (events won / competed); (W–L) win–loss record.
To avoid confusion and double counting, these charts are updated at the conclusion of a tournament or when the player's participation has ended.

=== Singles ===
Current through the 2024 Mubadala Citi DC Open.

Tournament	2019	2020	2021	2022	2023	2024	SR	W–L	Win%
Grand Slam
Australian Open	A	Q1	2R	4R	2R	Q2	0 / 3	5–3	63%
French Open	A	Q1	Q1	1R	1R	Q1	0 / 2	0–2	0%
Wimbledon	A	NH	Q3	2R	1R	Q3	0 / 2	1–2	33%
US Open	Q1	2R	2R	1R	Q2	Q3	0 / 3	2–3	40%
Win–loss	0–0	1–1	2–2	4–4	1–3	0–0	0 / 10	8–10	44%
ATP Masters 1000
Indian Wells Masters	A	NH	2R	1R	2R	Q1	0 / 3	1–3	25%
Miami Open	A	NH	Q1	1R	2R	A	0 / 2	0–2	0%
Monte-Carlo Masters	A	NH	A	1R	1R	A	0 / 2	0–2	0%
Madrid Open	A	NH	A	1R	1R	A	0 / 2	0–2	0%
Italian Open	A	A	A	Q2	1R	A	0 / 1	0–1	0%
Canadian Open	A	NH	Q1	2R	Q1	A	0 / 1	1–1	50%
Cincinnati Masters	A	A	A	1R	Q1	A	0 / 1	0–1	0%
Shanghai Masters	A	NH			A	Q1	0 / 0	0–0	–
Paris Masters	A	A	A	2R	A	A	0 / 1	1–1	50%
Win–loss	0–0	0–0	1–1	2–7	0–5	0–0	0 / 13	3–13	19%
Career statistics
Tournaments	0	1	6	28	20	4	Career total: 59		
Titles	0	0	0	1	0	0	Career total: 1		
Finals	0	0	0	3	1	0	Career total: 4		
Overall win–loss	0–0	1–1	6–6	26–27	9–20	1–4	1 / 59	43–58	43%
Year-end ranking	196	168	122	34	126	240	$2,863,880		

=== Doubles ===
Tournament	2019	2020	2021	2022	2023	2024	SR	W–L
Grand Slam tournaments
Australian Open	A	A	A	A	1R	A	0 / 1	0–1
French Open	A	A	A	3R	A	A	0 / 1	2–1
Wimbledon	A	NH	A	1R	1R	A	0 / 2	0–2
US Open	1R	A	A	A	1R	A	0 / 2	0–2
Win–loss	0–1	0–0	0–0	2–2	0–3	0–0	0 / 6	2–6
Career statistics
Tournaments	2	0	0	7	12	0	21	
Titles	0	0	0	0	1	0	1	
Finals	0	0	0	0	2	0	2	
Overall win–loss	0–2	0–0	0–0	8–7	12–11	0–0	20–20	
Year-end ranking	186	224	570	141	86	-	50%	

== ATP career finals ==
=== Singles: 4 (1 title, 3 runners-up) ===
Legend Grand Slam (0–0) ATP Finals (0–0) ATP Masters 1000 (0–0) ATP 500 Series (0–0) ATP 250 Series (1–3)	Finals by surface Hard (0–2) Clay (0–0) Grass (1–1)	Finals by setting Outdoor (1–2) Indoor (0–1)

Result	W–L	Date	Tournament	Tier	Surface	Opponent	Score
Loss	0–1	Jan 2022	Melbourne Summer Set 1, Australia	250 Series	Hard	(Spain) Rafael Nadal	6–7^{(6–8)}, 3–6
Loss	0–2	Jun 2022	Eastbourne International, United Kingdom	250 Series	Grass	(United States) Taylor Fritz	2–6, 7–6^{(7–4)}, 6–7^{(4–7)}
Win	1–2	Jul 2022	Hall of Fame Open, United States	250 Series	Grass	(Kazakhstan) Alexander Bublik	2–6, 6–3, 7–6^{(7–3)}
Loss	1–3	Feb 2023	Open Sud de France, France	250 Series	Hard (i)	(Italy) Jannik Sinner	6–7^{(3–7)}, 3–6

=== Doubles: 2 (1 title, 1 runner-up) ===
Legend Grand Slam (0–0) ATP Finals (0–0) ATP Masters 1000 (0–0) ATP 500 Series (1–0) ATP 250 Series (0–1)	Finals by surface Hard (1–1) Clay (0–0) Grass (0–0)	Finals by setting Outdoor (1–0) Indoor (0–1)

Result	W–L	Date	Tournament	Tier	Surface	Partner	Opponents	Score
Loss	0–1	Feb 2023	Open Sud de France, France	250 Series	Hard (i)	(France) Albano Olivetti	(Netherlands) Robin Haase (Netherlands) Matwé Middelkoop	6–7^{(4–7)}, 6–4, [6–10]
Win	1–1	Feb 2023	Dubai Tennis Championships, United Arab Emirates	500 Series	Hard	(France) Fabrice Martin	(United Kingdom) Lloyd Glasspool (Finland) Harri Heliövaara	7–6^{(7–2)}, 6–4

== ATP Challenger and ITF Futures finals ==
=== Singles: 12 (6–6) ===
Legend ATP Challenger (4–4) ITF Futures (2–2)	Finals by surface Hard (6–4) Clay (0–0) Grass (0–0) Carpet (0–2)

Result	W–L	Date	Tournament	Tier	Surface	Opponent	Score
Win	1–0	Feb 2019	Cleveland Open, US	Challenger	Hard (i)	(Denmark) Mikael Torpegaard	6–7^{(4–7)}, 7–6^{(8–6)}, 6–3
Loss	1–1	Oct 2019	Wolffkran Open, Germany	Challenger	Carpet (i)	(Slovakia) Lukáš Lacko	3–6, 0–6
Win	2–1	Feb 2020	Challenger Banque Nationale de Drummondville, Canada	Challenger	Hard (i)	(France) Arthur Rinderknech	6–7^{(4–7)}, 6–4, 6–4
Loss	2–2	Mar 2020	Calgary National Bank Challenger, Canada	Challenger	Hard (i)	(France) Arthur Rinderknech	6–3, 6–7^{(5–7)}, 4–6
Loss	2–3	Nov 2021	Challenger Eckental, Germany	Challenger	Carpet (i)	(Germany) Daniel Masur	4–6, 4–6
Loss	2–4	Nov 2021	Sparkassen ATP Challenger, Italy	Challenger	Hard (i)	(Germany) Oscar Otte	6–7^{(5–7)}, 4–6
Win	3–4	Nov 2021	Città di Forlì, Italy	Challenger	Hard (i)	(Germany) Matthias Bachinger	6–4, 6–2
Win	4–4	Sep 2023	Open de Rennes, France	Challenger	Hard (i)	(France) Benjamin Bonzi	6–3, 2–0 ret.

Result	W–L	Date	Tournament	Tier	Surface	Opponent	Score
Loss	0–1	Sep 2018	USA F25, Laguna Niguel	Futures	Hard	(United States) Brandon Nakashima	4–6, 4–6
Loss	0–2	Dec 2018	USA F34, Waco	Futures	Hard (i)	(Belgium) Michael Geerts	2–6, 6–4, 4–6
Win	1–2	Dec 2018	USA F35, Tallahassee	Futures	Hard (i)	(United Kingdom) Ryan Peniston	6–4, 7–6^{(7–4)}
Win	2–2	Jun 2019	M25 Tulsa, US	World Tennis Tour	Hard	(United States) Sam Riffice	6–3, 6–1

=== Doubles: 15 (13–2) ===
Legend ATP Challenger (2–2) ITF Futures (11–0)	Finals by surface Hard (13–1) Clay (0–0) Grass (0–0) Carpet (0–1)

Result	W–L	Date	Tournament	Tier	Surface	Partner	Opponents	Score
Win	1–0	Jan 2019	Columbus Challenger, US	Challenger	Hard (i)	(Portugal) Bernardo Saraiva	(United States) Robert Galloway (United States) Nathaniel Lammons	7–5, 7–6^{(7–3)}
Loss	1–1	Oct 2019	Wolffkran Open, Germany	Challenger	Carpet (i)	(United States) James Cerretani	(France) Quentin Halys (France) Tristan Lamasine	3–6, 5–7
Win	2–1	Oct 2019	Tennis Challenger Hamburg, Germany	Challenger	Hard (i)	(United States) James Cerretani	(United Kingdom) Ken Skupski (Australia) John-Patrick Smith	6–4, 6–4
Loss	2–2	Oct 2023	Internationaux de Tennis de Vendée, France	Challenger	Hard (i)	(Finland) Otto Virtanen	(United Kingdom) Julian Cash (United States) Robert Galloway	4–6, 7–5, [10–12]

Result	W–L	Date	Tournament	Tier	Surface	Partner	Opponents	Score
Win	1–0	Aug 2017	Belarus F2, Minsk	Futures	Hard	(France) Ugo Humbert	(Belarus) Ivan Liutarevich (Ukraine) Vadym Ursu	4–6, 6–3, [10–5]
Win	2–0	Jul 2018	USA F19, Wichita	Futures	Hard	(United States) Brandon Holt	(United States) Hunter Johnson (United States) Yates Johnson	3–6, 6–2, [10–6]
Win	3–0	Jul 2018	USA F20, Champaign	Futures	Hard	(United States) Martin Joyce	(United States) Charlie Emhardt (United States) Alfredo Perez	6–3, 6–2
Win	4–0	Jul 2018	USA F21, Decatur	Futures	Hard	(United States) Martin Joyce	(United States) Nicolas Meister (United States) Keegan Smith	4–6, 6–2, [10–2]
Win	5–0	Sep 2018	USA F26, Fountain Valley	Futures	Hard	(Moldova) Alexander Cozbinov	(United States) Alec Adamson (United States) Conor Berg	6–2, 6–2
Win	6–0	Oct 2018	USA F27, Houston	Futures	Hard	(United States) Nicolas Meister	(United States) John Paul Fruttero (Portugal) Bernardo Saraiva	7–5, 6–3
Win	7–0	Oct 2018	USA F28, Harlingen	Futures	Hard	(United States) Nicolas Meister	(United States) John Paul Fruttero (United States) Ronnie Schneider	6–4, 6–2
Win	8–0	Oct 2018	USA F28B, Waco	Futures	Hard	(United States) Nicolas Meister	(United States) John Paul Fruttero (United States) Danny Thomas	6–1, 6–4
Win	9–0	Dec 2018	USA F34, Waco	Futures	Hard (i)	(United States) Nicolas Meister	(Romania) Vasile-Alexandru Ghilea (United States) Robert Kelly	7–6^{(7–2)}, 7–6^{(9–7)}
Win	10–0	Jan 2019	M25 Los Angeles, US	World Tennis Tour	Hard	(Moldova) Alexander Cozbinov	(Mexico) Luis Patiño (Ecuador) Emilio Gómez	6–4, 6–2
Win	11–0	Jun 2019	M25 Tulsa, US	World Tennis Tour	Hard	(Portugal) Bernardo Saraiva	(United States) Martin Redlicki (United States) Evan Zhu	6–2, 3–6, [10–8]

== Wins over top 10 players ==
Cressy has a 2–10 record against players who were, at the time the match was played, ranked in the top 10.

Season	2022	2023	2024	Total
Wins	1	1	0	2

#	Player	Rk	Event	Surface	Rd	Score	Rk	Ref
2022
1.	(Canada) Félix Auger-Aliassime	9	Wimbledon, United Kingdom	Grass	1R	6–7^{(5–7)}, 6–4, 7–6^{(11–9)}, 7–6^{(7–5)}	45	
2023
2.	(Denmark) Holger Rune	9	Open Sud de France, France	Hard (i)	SF	7–5, 6–7^{(3–7)}, 7–6^{(7–4)}	51	
