= 2022 Columbus Challenger II =

- Date: September 19–25
- Edition: 12th
- Draw: 32S / 16D
- Surface: Hard (indoor)
- Location: Columbus, United States
- Venue: Ohio State Varsity Tennis Center

Champions

Singles
- (Australia) Jordan Thompson

Doubles
- (United Kingdom) Julian Cash / (United Kingdom) Henry Patten
← 2022 ·	Columbus Challenger	· 2023 →

The 2022 Columbus Challenger II was a professional tennis tournament played on indoor hard courts. It was the twelfth edition of the men's tournament which was part of the 2022 ATP Challenger Tour. It took place in Columbus, United States between September 19 and 25, 2022.

== Singles main draw entrants ==
=== Seeds ===
Country	Player	Rank^{1}	Seed
AUS	Jordan Thompson	102	1
ECU	Emilio Gómez	112	2
SUI	Dominic Stricker	124	3
AUS	Aleksandar Vukic	129	4
FRA	Enzo Couacaud	188	5
GER	Dominik Koepfer	194	6
GBR	Paul Jubb	196	7
AUS	Rinky Hijikata	206	8

- ^{1} Rankings are as of September 12, 2022.

=== Other entrants ===
The following players received entry into the singles main draw as wildcards:

- (Canada) Justin Boulais
- (United States) Cannon Kingsley
- (United States) James Tracy

The following players received entry into the singles main draw as alternates:

- (United States) Nick Chappell
- (United States) Ezekiel Clark
- (United States) Omni Kumar

The following players received entry from the qualifying draw:

- (United States) Robert Cash
- (United States) Ryan Harrison
- (United States) Patrick Kypson
- (Japan) Naoki Nakagawa
- (United States) Nathan Ponwith
- (Japan) James Trotter

The following player received entry as a lucky loser:

- (United States) Strong Kirchheimer

== Champions ==
=== Singles ===
- (Australia) Jordan Thompson def. (Ecuador) Emilio Gómez 7–6^{(8–6)}, 6–2.

=== Doubles ===
- (United Kingdom) Julian Cash / (United Kingdom) Henry Patten def. (United Kingdom) Charles Broom / (Germany) Constantin Frantzen 6–2, 7–5.
