= 2022 Columbus Challenger II – Doubles =

Doubles
- 2022 Columbus Challenger II

Final
- Champions: (United Kingdom) Julian Cash (United Kingdom) Henry Patten
- Runners-up: (United Kingdom) Charles Broom (Germany) Constantin Frantzen
- Score: 6–2, 7–5

Events
Singles	Doubles
← 2022 ·	Columbus Challenger	· 2023 →

Tennys Sandgren and Mikael Torpegaard were the defending champions but chose not to defend their title.

Julian Cash and Henry Patten won the title after defeating Charles Broom and Constantin Frantzen 6–2, 7–5 in the final.

== Seeds ==
1. (United Kingdom) Julian Cash / (United Kingdom) Henry Patten (champions)
2. (Colombia) Nicolás Mejía / (Ecuador) Roberto Quiroz (first round)
3. (France) Enzo Couacaud / (Australia) Andrew Harris (quarterfinals)
4. (Zimbabwe) Benjamin Lock / (Zimbabwe) Courtney John Lock (first round)

== Draw ==
=== Key ===
- Q = Qualifier
- WC = Wild card
- LL = Lucky loser
- Alt = Alternate
- ITF = ITF entry
- PR = Protected ranking
- SR = Special ranking
- SE = Special exempt
- JE = Junior exempt
- JR = Junior Accelerator Programme entrant
- CO = College Accelerator Programme entrant
- NG = Next Gen Accelerator Program entrant
- w/o = Walkover
- r = Retired
- d = Defaulted

First round
(United States) Jack Anthrop (United States) Alexander Bernard	4	2
(United Kingdom) A McHugh (United States) R Stalder	6	6
3	(France) E Couacaud (Australia) A Harris	6	7^{7}
(United States) Roy Smith (United States) D Young	4	6^{1}
(Canada) J Boulais (Japan) J Trotter	5	6	[10]
WC	(United States) Preston Stearns (United States) Reece Yakubov	7	2	[4]
(United Kingdom) C Broom (Germany) C Frantzen	4	6	[10]
4	(Zimbabwe) B Lock (Zimbabwe) CJ Lock	6	3	[2]
(Estonia) D Glinka (Estonia) Karl Kiur Saar	6	7
(United States) N Chappell (United States) E Zhu	4	5
WC	(United States) R Cash (Czech Republic) M Vocel	6	6
2	(Colombia) N Mejía (Ecuador) R Quiroz	3	1

Quarterfinals
1	(United Kingdom) J Cash (United Kingdom) H Patten	6	6
(United Kingdom) A McHugh (United States) R Stalder	2	3
3	(France) E Couacaud (Australia) A Harris	1	4
(United States) C Kingsley (United States) J Tracy	6	6
(Canada) J Boulais (Japan) J Trotter	7^{7}	6^{3}	[12]
(United Kingdom) C Broom (Germany) C Frantzen	6^{5}	7^{7}	[14]
(Estonia) D Glinka (Estonia) KK Saar	1	6^{11}
WC	(United States) R Cash (Czech Republic) M Vocel	6	7^{13}

Semifinals
1	(United Kingdom) J Cash (United Kingdom) H Patten	6	6
(United States) C Kingsley (United States) J Tracy	2	2
(United Kingdom) C Broom (Germany) C Frantzen	6	6
WC	(United States) R Cash (Czech Republic) M Vocel	4	4

Final
1	(United Kingdom) J Cash (United Kingdom) H Patten	6	7
(United Kingdom) C Broom (Germany) C Frantzen	2	5
