= 2022 Columbus Challenger II – Singles =

Singles
- 2022 Columbus Challenger II

Final
- Champion: (Australia) Jordan Thompson
- Runner-up: (Ecuador) Emilio Gómez
- Score: 7–6^{(8–6)}, 6–2

Events
Singles	Doubles
← 2022 ·	Columbus Challenger	· 2023 →

Yoshihito Nishioka was the defending champion but chose not to defend his title.

Jordan Thompson won the title after defeating Emilio Gómez 7–6^{(8–6)}, 6–2 in the final.

== Seeds ==
1. (Australia) Jordan Thompson (champion)
2. (Ecuador) Emilio Gómez (final)
3. (Switzerland) Dominic Stricker (quarterfinals)
4. (Australia) Aleksandar Vukic (quarterfinals)
5. (France) Enzo Couacaud (second round)
6. (Germany) Dominik Koepfer (first round)
7. (United Kingdom) Paul Jubb (second round)
8. (Australia) Rinky Hijikata (semifinals)

== Draw ==
=== Key ===
- Q = Qualifier
- WC = Wild card
- LL = Lucky loser
- Alt = Alternate
- SE = Special exempt
- PR = Protected ranking
- ITF = ITF entry
- JE = Junior exempt
- w/o = Walkover
- r = Retired
- d = Defaulted
- SR = Special ranking

=== Finals ===
Semifinals
1	(Australia) Jordan Thompson	7^{8}	6
WC	(United States) Cannon Kingsley	6^{6}	3
8	(Australia) Rinky Hijikata	6	3	0
2	(Ecuador) Emilio Gómez	3	6	6

Final
1	(Australia) Jordan Thompson	7^{8}	6
2	(Ecuador) Emilio Gómez	6^{6}	2

=== Top half ===
First round
1	(Australia) J Thompson	7^{7}	6
(United Kingdom) C Broom	6^{5}	2
(Colombia) N Mejía	4	4
(India) M Sasikumar	6	6
LL	(United States) S Kirchheimer	4	3
(Canada) G Diallo	6	6
(United Kingdom) A McHugh	3	7^{7}	7^{9}
6	(Germany) D Koepfer	6	6^{4}	6^{7}
4	(Australia) A Vukic	6	6
(United Kingdom) D Cox	4	2
Alt	(United States) Ezekiel Clark	5	2
Q	(Japan) N Nakagawa	7	6
WC	(United States) C Kingsley	6	6
Q	(Japan) J Trotter	4	4
Q	(United States) R Harrison	6^{6}	4
7	(United Kingdom) P Jubb	7^{8}	6

Second round
1	(Australia) J Thompson	6	6
(India) M Sasikumar	3	3
(Canada) G Diallo	7	6^{6}	7
(United Kingdom) A McHugh	5	7^{8}	5
4	(Australia) A Vukic	7	3	7^{7}
Q	(Japan) N Nakagawa	5	6	6^{2}
WC	(United States) C Kingsley	7^{7}	6
7	(United Kingdom) P Jubb	6^{4}	4

Quarterfinals
1	(Australia) J Thompson	6	6
(Canada) G Diallo	2	1
4	(Australia) A Vukic	3	2
WC	(United States) C Kingsley	6	6

Semifinals
1	(Australia) J Thompson	7^{8}	6
WC	(United States) C Kingsley	6^{6}	3

=== Bottom half ===
First round
8	(Australia) R Hijikata	6	6
Q	(United States) Nathan Ponwith	1	4
WC	(Canada) J Boulais	7	7^{7}
WC	(United States) J Tracy	5	6^{4}
(Zimbabwe) B Lock	3	6	7^{9}
(United States) E Zhu	6	1	6^{7}
Q	(United States) P Kypson	2	4
3	(Switzerland) D Stricker	6	6
5	(France) E Couacaud	6	7
(Ecuador) R Quiroz	3	5
Alt	(United States) N Chappell	1	6	6
(Canada) A Galarneau	6	1	3
Alt	(United States) O Kumar	5	2
(United States) T Sandgren	7	6
Q	(United States) R Cash	3	2
2	(Ecuador) E Gómez	6	6

Second round
8	(Australia) R Hijikata	6	6
WC	(Canada) J Boulais	4	4
(Zimbabwe) B Lock	3	2
3	(Switzerland) D Stricker	6	6
5	(France) E Couacaud	4	7^{7}	4
Alt	(United States) N Chappell	6	6^{1}	6
(United States) T Sandgren	6	3	2
2	(Ecuador) E Gómez	3	6	6

Quarterfinals
8	(Australia) R Hijikata	4	7^{9}	6
3	(Switzerland) D Stricker	6	6^{7}	3
Alt	(United States) N Chappell	3	1
2	(Ecuador) E Gómez	6	6

Semifinals
8	(Australia) R Hijikata	6	3	0
2	(Ecuador) E Gómez	3	6	6
