= 2018 Columbus Challenger – Doubles =

Doubles
- 2018 Columbus Challenger

Final
- Champions: (United States) Tommy Paul (Canada) Peter Polansky
- Runners-up: (Ecuador) Gonzalo Escobar (Ecuador) Roberto Quiroz
- Score: 6–3, 6–3

Events
| Singles | Doubles |
- Columbus Challenger

Dominik Köpfer and Denis Kudla were the defending champions but only Köpfer chose to defend his title, partnering Andrew Harris. Köpfer lost in the first round to Martin Joyce and J. J. Wolf.

Tommy Paul and Peter Polansky won the title after defeating Gonzalo Escobar and Roberto Quiroz 6–3, 6–3 in the final.

== Seeds ==
1. (South Africa) Ruan Roelofse / (Australia) John-Patrick Smith (quarterfinals)
2. (United States) Evan King / (United States) Hunter Reese (first round)
3. (Australia) Matt Reid / (Australia) Luke Saville (first round)
4. (United States) Robert Galloway / (Zimbabwe) Benjamin Lock (semifinals)

== Draw ==
Key

- Q = Qualifier
- WC = Wild card
- LL = Lucky loser
- Alt = Alternate
- ITF = ITF entry
- PR = Protected ranking
- SR = Special ranking
- SE = Special exempt
- JE = Junior exempt
- JR = Junior Accelerator Programme entrant
- CO = College Accelerator Programme entrant
- NG = Next Gen Accelerator Program entrant
- w/o = Walkover
- r = Retired
- d = Defaulted

First round
1 | (South Africa) R Roelofse (Australia) J-P Smith | 6 | 6
(Australia) M Banes (Australia) A Popyrin | 3 | 4
WC | (United States) R Cash (United States) C Kingsley | 3 | 3
(United States) T Paul (Canada) P Polansky | 6 | 6
4 | (United States) R Galloway (Zimbabwe) B Lock | 7^{7} | 4 | [10]
(Mexico) H Hach Verdugo (Sweden) A Siljeström | 6^{4} | 6 | [7]
(Australia) A Harris (Germany) D Köpfer | 4 | 1
WC | (United States) Martin Joyce (United States) J. J. Wolf | 6 | 6
(Dominican Republic) R Cid Subervi (Dominican Republic) J Hernández-Fernández | 4 | 7 | [8]
(Venezuela) LD Martínez (Spain) D Pérez Sanz | 6 | 5 | [10]
(Ecuador) G Escobar (Ecuador) R Quiroz | 6 | 6^{4} | [10]
3 | (Australia) M Reid (Australia) L Saville | 4 | 7^{7} | [8]
(United States) S Bangoura (United States) N Pasha | 3 | 7^{7} | [3]
(Japan) T Matsui (Netherlands) S Verbeek | 6 | 6^{5} | [10]
WC | (United States) J McNally (United States) Hunter Tubert | 3 | 6 | [10]
2 | (United States) E King (United States) H Reese | 6 | 3 | [8]

Quarterfinals
1 | (South Africa) R Roelofse (Australia) J-P Smith | 6 | 3 | [7]
(United States) T Paul (Canada) P Polansky | 3 | 6 | [10]
4 | (United States) R Galloway (Zimbabwe) B Lock | 2 | 7^{7} | [10]
WC | (United States) M Joyce (United States) J. J. Wolf | 6 | 6^{5} | [8]
(Venezuela) LD Martínez (Spain) D Pérez Sanz | 3 | 7^{7} | [3]
(Ecuador) G Escobar (Ecuador) R Quiroz | 6 | 6^{5} | [10]
(Japan) T Matsui (Netherlands) S Verbeek | 6 | 6
WC | (United States) J McNally (United States) H Tubert | 4 | 4

Semifinals
(United States) T Paul (Canada) P Polansky | 5 | 6 | [10]
4 | (United States) R Galloway (Zimbabwe) B Lock | 7 | 2 | [2]
(Ecuador) G Escobar (Ecuador) R Quiroz | 2 | 6 | [10]
(Japan) T Matsui (Netherlands) S Verbeek | 6 | 3 | [1]

Final
(United States) T Paul (Canada) P Polansky | 6 | 6
(Ecuador) G Escobar (Ecuador) R Quiroz | 3 | 3
