= 2023 Columbus Challenger =

- Date: September 18–24
- Edition: 13th
- Draw: 32S / 16D
- Surface: Hard (indoor)
- Location: Columbus, United States
- Venue: Ohio State Varsity Tennis Center

Champions

Singles
- (United States) Denis Kudla

Doubles
- (United States) Robert Cash / (Japan) James Trotter
← 2022 ·	Columbus Challenger	· 2024 →

The 2023 Columbus Challenger was a professional tennis tournament played on indoor hard courts. It was the 13th edition of the men's tournament which was part of the 2023 ATP Challenger Tour. It took place in Columbus, United States between September 18 and 24, 2023.

== Singles main draw entrants ==
=== Seeds ===
Country	Player	Rank^{1}	Seed
FRA	Enzo Couacaud	178	1
USA	Denis Kudla	181	2
ECU	Emilio Gómez	185	3
CAN	Vasek Pospisil	187	4
USA	Tennys Sandgren	196	5
CAN	Alexis Galarneau	200	6
AUS	Adam Walton	203	7
USA	Zachary Svajda	207	8

- ^{1} Rankings are as of September 11, 2023.

=== Other entrants ===
The following players received entry into the singles main draw as wildcards:

- (Canada) Justin Boulais
- (United States) Cannon Kingsley
- (United States) James Tracy

The following player received entry into the singles main draw using a protected ranking:

- (United States) Christian Harrison

The following players received entry into the singles main draw as alternates:

- (Belgium) Michael Geerts
- (Ukraine) Illya Marchenko
- (Australia) Tristan Schoolkate

The following players received entry from the qualifying draw:

- (United States) Jack Anthrop
- (Argentina) Federico Agustín Gómez
- (United States) Strong Kirchheimer
- (United States) Aidan Mayo
- (Australia) Bernard Tomic
- (Japan) James Trotter

== Champions ==
=== Singles ===
- (United States) Denis Kudla def. (Canada) Alexis Galarneau 6–2, 6–1.

=== Doubles ===
- (United States) Robert Cash / (Japan) James Trotter def. (Argentina) Guido Andreozzi / (Mexico) Hans Hach Verdugo 6–4, 2–6, [10–7].
