= 2019 Columbus Challenger II – Doubles =

Doubles
- 2019 Columbus Challenger II

Final
- Champions: (Venezuela) Roberto Maytín (United States) Jackson Withrow
- Runners-up: (Mexico) Hans Hach Verdugo (United States) Donald Young
- Score: 6–7^{(4–7)}, 7–6^{(7–2)}, [10–5]

Events
Singles	Doubles
← 2019 ·	Columbus Challenger	· 2019 →

Maxime Cressy and Bernardo Saraiva were the defending champions but lost in the quarterfinals to Roberto Maytín and Jackson Withrow.

Maytín and Withrow won the title after defeating Hans Hach Verdugo and Donald Young 6–7^{(4–7)}, 7–6^{(7–2)}, [10–5] in the final.

== Seeds ==
1. (Venezuela) Roberto Maytín / (United States) Jackson Withrow (champions)
2. (Venezuela) Luis David Martínez / (Ecuador) Roberto Quiroz (quarterfinals)
3. (Finland) Harri Heliövaara / (United States) Alex Lawson (quarterfinals)
4. (China) Li Zhe / (Japan) Yasutaka Uchiyama (quarterfinals)

== Draw ==
=== Key ===
- Q = Qualifier
- WC = Wild card
- LL = Lucky loser
- Alt = Alternate
- SE = Special exempt
- PR = Protected ranking
- ITF = ITF entry
- JE = Junior exempt
- w/o = Walkover
- r = Retired
- d = Defaulted
- SR = Special ranking

First round
1	(Venezuela) R Maytín (United States) J Withrow	w/o
ITF	(Argentina) MF Descotte (Brazil) O Luz
(United States) M Cressy (Portugal) B Saraiva	6	6
WC	(United States) R Cash (United States) J Mercer	1	2
3	(Finland) H Heliövaara (United States) A Lawson	6	6
WC	(United States) C Kingsley (United States) J McNally	2	2
(Ecuador) E Gómez (Argentina) F Mena
ITF	(Peru) N Álvarez (Netherlands) G Brouwer	w/o
(Mexico) H Hach Verdugo (United States) D Young	w/o
(United States) C Altamirano (United States) T-S Kwiatkowski
(India) A Kadhe (Ukraine) V Uzhylovskyi	4	3
4	(China) Z Li (Japan) Y Uchiyama	6	6
Alt	(Canada) A Galarneau (China) Zh Zhang	1	4
(United States) JP Fruttero (South Korea) J-s Nam	6	6
WC	(Canada) J Boulais (Japan) J Trotter	3	3
2	(Venezuela) LD Martínez (Ecuador) R Quiroz	6	6

Quarterfinals
1	(Venezuela) R Maytín (United States) J Withrow	4	6	[10]
(United States) M Cressy (Portugal) B Saraiva	6	3	[7]
3	(Finland) H Heliövaara (United States) A Lawson	6	3	[11]
ITF	(Peru) N Álvarez (Netherlands) G Brouwer	3	6	[13]
(Mexico) H Hach Verdugo (United States) D Young	6	7^{7}
4	(China) Z Li (Japan) Y Uchiyama	3	6^{3}
(United States) JP Fruttero (South Korea) J-s Nam	6	4	[10]
2	(Venezuela) LD Martínez (Ecuador) R Quiroz	4	6	[5]

Semifinals
1	(Venezuela) R Maytín (United States) J Withrow	4	7^{7}	[10]
ITF	(Peru) N Álvarez (Netherlands) G Brouwer	6	6^{2}	[8]
(Mexico) H Hach Verdugo (United States) D Young	6	6
(United States) JP Fruttero (South Korea) J-s Nam	4	4

Final
1	(Venezuela) R Maytín (United States) J Withrow	6^{4}	7^{7}	[10]
(Mexico) H Hach Verdugo (United States) D Young	7^{7}	6^{2}	[5]
