= 2019 Columbus Challenger II – Singles =

Singles
- 2019 Columbus Challenger II

Final
- Champion: (Denmark) Mikael Torpegaard
- Runner-up: (South Korea) Nam Ji-sung
- Score: 6–1, 7–5

Events
Singles	Doubles
← 2019 ·	Columbus Challenger	· 2019 →

J. J. Wolf was the defending champion but lost in the second round to Nam Ji-sung.

Mikael Torpegaard won the title after defeating Nam 6–1, 7–5 in the final.

== Seeds ==
All seeds receive a bye into the second round.

1. (United States) Michael Mmoh (second round, retired)
2. (Japan) Yasutaka Uchiyama (quarterfinals)
3. (Ecuador) Emilio Gómez (quarterfinals)
4. (United States) Donald Young (second round)
5. (Barbados) Darian King (withdrew)
6. (Israel) Dudi Sela (semifinals, retired)
7. (Ecuador) Roberto Quiroz (second round)
8. (Denmark) Mikael Torpegaard (champion)
9. (United States) Tim Smyczek (third round)
10. (China) Li Zhe (second round)
11. (South Korea) Lee Duck-hee (third round)
12. (United States) Thai-Son Kwiatkowski (semifinals)
13. (Canada) Filip Peliwo (second round)
14. (United States) J. J. Wolf (second round)
15. (United States) Collin Altamirano (third round)
16. (Brazil) João Menezes (quarterfinals)

== Draw ==
=== Key ===
- Q = Qualifier
- WC = Wild card
- LL = Lucky loser
- Alt = Alternate
- SE = Special exempt
- PR = Protected ranking
- ITF = ITF entry
- JE = Junior exempt
- w/o = Walkover
- r = Retired
- d = Defaulted
- SR = Special ranking

=== Finals ===
Quarterfinals
(South Korea) Nam Ji-sung	6	6
(China) Zhang Zhizhen	3	2
16	(Brazil) João Menezes	6	3	1
6	(Israel) Dudi Sela	4	6	6
12	(United States) Thai-Son Kwiatkowski	2	6	6
3	(Ecuador) Emilio Gómez	6	0	3
8	(Denmark) Mikael Torpegaard	6	6
2	(Japan) Yasutaka Uchiyama	3	3

Semifinals
(South Korea) Nam Ji-sung	6	5
6	(Israel) Dudi Sela	3	3^{r}
12	(United States) Thai-Son Kwiatkowski	4	6^{5}
8	(Denmark) Mikael Torpegaard	6	7^{7}

Final
(South Korea) Nam Ji-sung	1	5
8	(Denmark) Mikael Torpegaard	6	7

=== Top half ===
==== Section 1 ====
First round
Q	(Colombia) A González	6	6
WC	(Colombia) N Mejía	2	4
WC	(United States) C Kingsley	5	4
(South Korea) J-s Nam	7	6
(China) Zh Zhang	6	6
Alt	(Finland) H Heliövaara	3	4
ITF	(Argentina) F Cerúndolo	6	6
(Argentina) F Mena	4	1

Second round
1	(United States) M Mmoh	2	2^{r}
Q	(Colombia) A González	6	1
(South Korea) J-s Nam	6	3	6
14	(United States) J. J. Wolf	4	6	4
10	(China) Z Li	4	4
(China) Zh Zhang	6	6
ITF	(Argentina) F Cerúndolo	6	6^{9}	6
7	(Ecuador) R Quiroz	1	7^{11}	0

Third round
Q	(Colombia) A González	4	2
(South Korea) J-s Nam	6	6
(China) Zh Zhang	6	6
ITF	(Argentina) F Cerúndolo	4	4

Quarterfinals
(South Korea) J-s Nam	6	6
(China) Zh Zhang	3	2

==== Section 2 ====
First round
Q	(United States) D Novikov	6	6
(United States) Mi Redlicki	4	3
(France) V Millot	2	1^{r}
(United States) A Sarkissian	6	4
ITF	(Brazil) O Luz	5	7^{7}	5
WC	(United States) J McNally	7	6^{4}	7
(United States) R Shane	6^{4}	6^{3}
(Argentina) MF Descotte	7^{7}	7^{7}

Second round
4	(United States) D Young	6^{6}	2
Q	(United States) D Novikov	7^{8}	6
(United States) A Sarkissian	3	7^{7}	3
16	(Brazil) J Menezes	6	6^{5}	6
11	(South Korea) D-h Lee	6	7
WC	(United States) J McNally	3	5
(Argentina) MF Descotte	3	3
6	(Israel) D Sela	6	6

Third round
Q	(United States) D Novikov	2	1^{r}
16	(Brazil) J Menezes	6	4
11	(South Korea) D-h Lee	3	1
6	(Israel) D Sela	6	6

Quarterfinals
16	(Brazil) J Menezes	6	3	1
6	(Israel) D Sela	4	6	6

=== Bottom half ===
==== Section 3 ====
First round
(United States) M Cressy	6	3	4
(Brazil) T Seyboth Wild	0	6	6
PR	(United States) D Nguyen	6	6^{5}	7
ITF	(Netherlands) G Brouwer	4	7^{7}	5
WC	(Japan) J Trotter	7^{7}	6
(United States) Roy Smith	6^{3}	3
(Canada) A Galarneau	6^{4}	6	6
WC	(Canada) J Boulais	7^{7}	4	0

Second round
LL	(United States) A Kovacevic	4	6	5
(Brazil) T Seyboth Wild	6	3	7
PR	(United States) D Nguyen	6	2	4
12	(United States) T-S Kwiatkowski	4	6	6
15	(United States) C Altamirano	6	6
WC	(Japan) J Trotter	3	1
(Canada) A Galarneau	1	3
3	(Ecuador) E Gómez	6	6

Third round
(Brazil) T Seyboth Wild	6	5	2
12	(United States) T-S Kwiatkowski	3	7	6
15	(United States) C Altamirano	5	7	0
3	(Ecuador) E Gómez	7	5	6

Quarterfinals
12	(United States) T-S Kwiatkowski	2	6	6
3	(Ecuador) E Gómez	6	0	3

==== Section 4 ====
First round
ITF	(Peru) N Álvarez	6^{6}	6^{5}
PR	(United States) R Sarmiento	7^{8}	7^{7}
(Hungary) Z Piros	6	7
(Japan) Makoto Ochi	4	5
PR	(Spain) C Gómez-Herrera	6	7^{7}
(Ukraine) I Marchenko	1	6^{4}
(United States) Jared Hiltzik	3	2
(United States) Evan Song	6	6

Second round
8	(Denmark) M Torpegaard	6	7
PR	(United States) R Sarmiento	4	5
(Hungary) Z Piros	3	6	2
9	(United States) T Smyczek	6	4	6
13	(Canada) F Peliwo	3	4
PR	(Spain) C Gómez-Herrera	6	6
(United States) E Song	7^{9}	6^{4}	4
2	(Japan) Y Uchiyama	6^{7}	7^{7}	6

Third round
8	(Denmark) M Torpegaard	6	6
9	(United States) T Smyczek	2	1
PR	(Spain) C Gómez-Herrera	6	3	4
2	(Japan) Y Uchiyama	3	6	6

Quarterfinals
8	(Denmark) M Torpegaard	6	6
2	(Japan) Y Uchiyama	3	3
