= 2019 Columbus Challenger II =

Professional tennis tournament

- Date: 10–16 June
- Edition: 7th
- Draw: 48S / 16D
- Surface: Hard
- Location: Columbus, United States

Champions

Singles
- (Denmark) Mikael Torpegaard

Doubles
- (Venezuela) Roberto Maytín / (United States) Jackson Withrow
← 2019 ·	Columbus Challenger	· 2019 →

The 2019 Columbus Challenger II was a professional tennis tournament played on hard courts. It was the seventh edition of the tournament which was part of the 2019 ATP Challenger Tour. It took place in Columbus, United States between 10 and 16 June 2019.

== Singles main draw entrants ==
=== Seeds ===
Country	Player	Rank^{1}	Seed
USA	Michael Mmoh	141	1
JPN	Yasutaka Uchiyama	179	2
ECU	Emilio Gómez	191	3
USA	Donald Young	193	4
~~BAR~~	~~Darian King~~	~~200~~	~~5~~
ISR	Dudi Sela	209	6
ECU	Roberto Quiroz	217	7
DEN	Mikael Torpegaard	218	8
USA	Tim Smyczek	224	9
CHN	Li Zhe	239	10
KOR	Lee Duck-hee	243	11
USA	Thai-Son Kwiatkowski	248	12
CAN	Filip Peliwo	267	13
USA	J. J. Wolf	270	14
USA	Collin Altamirano	277	15
BRA	João Menezes	287	16

- ^{1} Rankings are as of May 27, 2019.

=== Other entrants ===
The following players received entry into the singles main draw as wildcards:

- (Canada) Justin Boulais
- (United States) Cannon Kingsley
- (United States) John McNally
- (Colombia) Nicolás Mejía
- (Japan) James Trotter

The following players received entry into the singles main draw using protected rankings:

- (Spain) Carlos Gómez-Herrera
- (United States) Daniel Nguyen
- (United States) Raymond Sarmiento

The following player received entry into the singles main draw as an alternate:

- (Finland) Harri Heliövaara

The following players received entry into the singles main draw using their ITF World Tennis Ranking:

- (Peru) Nicolás Álvarez
- (France) ~~Geoffrey Blancaneaux~~
- (Netherlands) Gijs Brouwer
- (Argentina) Francisco Cerúndolo
- (Brazil) Orlando Luz

The following players received entry from the qualifying draw:

- (Colombia) Alejandro González
- (United States) Dennis Novikov

The following player received entry as a lucky loser:

- (United States) Aleksandar Kovacevic

== Champions ==
=== Singles ===
- (Denmark) Mikael Torpegaard def. (South Korea) Nam Ji-sung 6–1, 7–5.

=== Doubles ===
- (Venezuela) Roberto Maytín / (United States) Jackson Withrow def. (Mexico) Hans Hach Verdugo / (United States) Donald Young 6–7^{(4–7)}, 7–6^{(7–2)}, [10–5].
