= 2023 Columbus Challenger – Singles =

Singles
- 2023 Columbus Challenger

Final
- Champion: (United States) Denis Kudla
- Runner-up: (Canada) Alexis Galarneau
- Score: 6–2, 6–1

Events
Singles	Doubles
← 2022 ·	Columbus Challenger	· 2024 →

Jordan Thompson was the defending champion but chose not to defend his title.

Denis Kudla won the title after defeating Alexis Galarneau 6–2, 6–1 in the final.

== Seeds ==
1. (France) Enzo Couacaud (quarterfinals)
2. (United States) Denis Kudla (champion)
3. (Ecuador) Emilio Gómez (first round)
4. (Canada) Vasek Pospisil (quarterfinals)
5. (United States) Tennys Sandgren (second round)
6. (Canada) Alexis Galarneau (final)
7. (Australia) Adam Walton (second round)
8. (United States) Zachary Svajda (second round)

== Draw ==
=== Key ===
- Q = Qualifier
- WC = Wild card
- LL = Lucky loser
- Alt = Alternate
- SE = Special exempt
- PR = Protected ranking
- ITF = ITF entry
- JE = Junior exempt
- w/o = Walkover
- r = Retired
- d = Defaulted
- SR = Special ranking

=== Finals ===
Semifinals
6	(Canada) Alexis Galarneau	6	7^{7}
WC	(United States) Cannon Kingsley	4	6^{2}
(United Kingdom) Ryan Peniston	5	2
2	(United States) Denis Kudla	7	6

Final
6	(Canada) Alexis Galarneau	2	1
2	(United States) Denis Kudla	6	6

=== Top half ===
First round
1	(France) E Couacaud	6	7
Q	(United States) A Mayo	2	5
Q	(Argentina) FA Gómez	7	7^{7}
(United States) E Quinn	5	6^{3}
Q	(United States) Jack Anthrop	1	0
(France) L Lokoli	6	6
(Argentina) JP Ficovich	4	3
6	(Canada) A Galarneau	6	6
3	(Ecuador) E Gómez	0	6	3
Q	(Japan) J Trotter	6	4	6
WC	(United States) C Kingsley	6	6
(Switzerland) A Ritschard	1	4
PR	(United States) C Harrison	6	4
(Tunisia) A Dougaz	1	0^{r}
(Argentina) G Andreozzi	1	4
8	(United States) Z Svajda	6	6

Second round
1	(France) E Couacaud	7	6
Q	(Argentina) FA Gómez	5	4
(France) L Lokoli	5	6^{5}
6	(Canada) A Galarneau	7	7^{7}
Q	(Japan) J Trotter	4	7^{7}	3
WC	(United States) C Kingsley	6	6^{2}	6
PR	(United States) C Harrison	6	7
8	(United States) Z Svajda	4	5

Quarterfinals
1	(France) E Couacaud	3	4
6	(Canada) A Galarneau	6	6
WC	(United States) C Kingsley	7	6
PR	(United States) C Harrison	5	4

Semifinals
6	(Canada) A Galarneau	6	7^{7}
WC	(United States) C Kingsley	4	6^{2}

=== Bottom half ===
First round
5	(United States) T Sandgren	6	6
Alt	(Ukraine) I Marchenko	2	1
(United Kingdom) R Peniston	3
Q	(Australia) B Tomic	1^{r}
WC	(United States) J Tracy	6	7
WC	(Canada) J Boulais	3	5
(United States) N Basavareddy	5	6	5
4	(Canada) V Pospisil	7	2	7
7	(Australia) A Walton	7	6
(France) G Mpetshi Perricard	5	4
Alt	(Australia) T Schoolkate	6	6
(Jordan) A Shelbayh	4	3
(United States) M Krueger	5	2
Alt	(Belgium) M Geerts	7	6
Q	(United States) S Kirchheimer	2	4
2	(United States) D Kudla	6	6

Second round
5	(United States) T Sandgren	6^{0}	1
(United Kingdom) R Peniston	7^{7}	6
WC	(United States) J Tracy	3	4
4	(Canada) V Pospisil	6	6
7	(Australia) A Walton	6	3	1
Alt	(Australia) T Schoolkate	4	6	6
Alt	(Belgium) M Geerts	5	6	3
2	(United States) D Kudla	7	3	6

Quarterfinals
(United Kingdom) R Peniston	7	3	6
4	(Canada) V Pospisil	5	6	4
Alt	(Australia) T Schoolkate	2	4
2	(United States) D Kudla	6	6

Semifinals
(United Kingdom) R Peniston	5	2
2	(United States) D Kudla	7	6
