= 2025 Columbus Challenger – Doubles =

Doubles
- 2025 Columbus Challenger

Final
- Champions: (Australia) Patrick Harper (United Kingdom) Johannus Monday
- Runners-up: (United States) George Goldhoff (United States) Theodore Winegar
- Score: 6–4, 6–3

Events
Singles	Doubles
- Columbus Challenger

Hans Hach Verdugo and James Trotter were the defending champions but only Hach Verdugo chose to defend his title, partnering Cannon Kingsley. They lost in the first round to George Goldhoff and Theodore Winegar.

Patrick Harper and Johannus Monday won the title after defeating Goldhoff and Winegar 6–4, 6–3 in the final.

== Seeds ==
1. (Venezuela) Luis David Martínez / (Germany) Daniel Masur (first round)
2. (United States) George Goldhoff / (United States) Theodore Winegar (final)
3. (United States) Pranav Kumar / (Australia) Kody Pearson (first round)
4. (United Kingdom) Scott Duncan / (United Kingdom) Tom Hands (first round)

== Draw ==
Key

- Q = Qualifier
- WC = Wild card
- LL = Lucky loser
- Alt = Alternate
- ITF = ITF entry
- PR = Protected ranking
- SR = Special ranking
- SE = Special exempt
- JE = Junior exempt
- JR = Junior Accelerator Programme entrant
- CO = College Accelerator Programme entrant
- NG = Next Gen Accelerator Program entrant
- w/o = Walkover
- r = Retired
- d = Defaulted

=== Draw ===
First round
1	(Venezuela) LD Martínez (Germany) D Masur	6	3	[3]
(Italy) F Bondioli (Italy) CA Caniato	4	6	[10]
(United States) G Johns (United States) Jamie Vance	4	6	[5]
(Australia) P Harper (United Kingdom) J Monday	6	3	[10]
3	(United States) P Kumar (Australia) K Pearson	0	5
(Colombia) N Mejía (Jordan) A Shelbayh	6	7
(Zimbabwe) CJ Lock (United States) Tristan McCormick	4	4
(India) Sai Karteek Reddy Ganta (Japan) Ryuki Matsuda	6	6
WC	(United States) Aidan Kim (United States) Bry Nakashima	6	6
(Australia) M Bouzige (United States) Andre Ilagan	3	4
(United States) B Kittay (United States) J Sheehy	6	6
4	(United Kingdom) S Duncan (United Kingdom) T Hands	3	2
(Antigua and Barbuda) J Maginley (United States) A Perez	6	1	[13]
WC	(United States) B Carpico (United Kingdom) Alexander Okonkwo	2	6	[11]
(Mexico) H Hach Verdugo (United States) C Kingsley	3	6	[6]
2	(United States) G Goldhoff (United States) T Winegar	6	3	[10]

Quarterfinals
(Italy) F Bondioli (Italy) CA Caniato	3	2
(Australia) P Harper (United Kingdom) J Monday	6	6
(Colombia) N Mejía (Jordan) A Shelbayh	4	3
(India) SKR Ganta (Japan) R Matsuda	6	6
WC	(United States) A Kim (United States) Bry Nakashima	3	2
(United States) B Kittay (United States) J Sheehy	6	6
(Antigua and Barbuda) J Maginley (United States) A Perez	4	3
2	(United States) G Goldhoff (United States) T Winegar	6	6

Semifinals
(Australia) P Harper (United Kingdom) J Monday	6	6
(India) SKR Ganta (Japan) R Matsuda	2	1
(United States) B Kittay (United States) J Sheehy	6	3	[13]
2	(United States) G Goldhoff (United States) T Winegar	4	6	[15]

Final
(Australia) P Harper (United Kingdom) J Monday	6	6
2	(United States) G Goldhoff (United States) T Winegar	4	3
