= 2025 Columbus Challenger – Singles =

Singles
- 2025 Columbus Challenger

Final
- Champion: (United States) Michael Zheng
- Runner-up: (United States) Martin Damm
- Score: 3–6, 6–3, 7–5

Events
Singles	Doubles
- Columbus Challenger

Naoki Nakagawa was the defending champion but chose not to defend his title.

Michael Zheng won the title after defeating Martin Damm 3–6, 6–3, 7–5 in the final.

== Seeds ==
1. (Argentina) Juan Pablo Ficovich (first round, retired)
2. (United States) Murphy Cassone (first round)
3. (Japan) James Trotter (quarterfinals)
4. (Colombia) Nicolás Mejía (first round)
5. (United Kingdom) Johannus Monday (first round)
6. (United States) Andres Martin (second round)
7. (United States) Martin Damm (final)
8. (United States) Garrett Johns (first round)

== Draw ==
Key

- Q = Qualifier
- WC = Wild card
- LL = Lucky loser
- Alt = Alternate
- ITF = ITF entry
- PR = Protected ranking
- SR = Special ranking
- SE = Special exempt
- JE = Junior exempt
- JR = Junior Accelerator Programme entrant
- CO = College Accelerator Programme entrant
- NG = Next Gen Accelerator Program entrant
- w/o = Walkover
- r = Retired
- d = Defaulted

=== Finals ===
Semifinals
(United States) Michael Zheng	6	6
Q	(Germany) Daniel Masur	3	2
7/Alt	(United States) Martin Damm	6	6
Q	(United States) Samir Banerjee	4	2

Final
(United States) Michael Zheng	3	6	7
7/Alt	(United States) Martin Damm	6	3	5

=== Top half ===
First round
1	(Argentina) JP Ficovich	0^{r}
(United States) A Perez	4
JR	(France) T Papamalamis	1	5
Q	(Canada) J Boulais	6	7
(United States) Andre Ilagan	6	3	6
Q	(Slovenia) Sebastian Dominko	3	6	4
(United States) M Zheng	6	6
8	(United States) G Johns	0	4
4	(Colombia) N Mejía	3	2
(Spain) R Jódar	6	6
(United States) A Rybakov	6	6
(Australia) M Bouzige	1	2
Q	(United States) Preston Stearns	4	7^{7}	6^{5}
Q	(Germany) D Masur	6	6^{4}	7^{7}
(Italy) F Bondioli	3	2
6	(United States) A Martin	6	6

Second round
(United States) A Perez	6	6
Q	(Canada) J Boulais	3	3
(United States) A Ilagan	3	6^{1}
(United States) M Zheng	6	7^{7}
(Spain) R Jódar	6	6
(United States) A Rybakov	3	4
Q	(Germany) D Masur	3	7	6
6	(United States) A Martin	6	5	3

Quarterfinals
(United States) A Perez	2	6	3
(United States) M Zheng	6	3	6
(Spain) R Jódar	1	5
Q	(Germany) D Masur	6	7

Semifinals
(United States) M Zheng	6	6
Q	(Germany) D Masur	3	2

=== Bottom half ===
First round
7/Alt	(United States) M Damm	6	6
WC	(United States) Aidan Kim	2	4
WC	(United States) Jack Anthrop	6	1	6^{4}
Q	(France) A Ghibaudo	3	6	7^{7}
Alt	(Czech Republic) Petr Brunclík	4	0
(United States) Patrick Maloney	6	6
PR	(Australia) P Sekulic	4	1
3	(Japan) J Trotter	6	6
5	(United Kingdom) J Monday	3	6	6^{5}
(United States) Dar Blanch	6	3	7^{7}
(United States) Christian Langmo	6^{2}	2
Q	(United States) S Banerjee	7^{7}	6
(United States) T Zink	6	6
WC	(United States) Alexander Bernard	3	3
(Jordan) A Shelbayh	6	6
2	(United States) M Cassone	4	4

Second round
7/Alt	(United States) M Damm	6	6
Q	(France) A Ghibaudo	3	4
(United States) P Maloney	2	3
3	(Japan) J Trotter	6	6
(United States) Dar Blanch	0	6	3
Q	(United States) S Banerjee	6	3	6
(United States) T Zink	6	7^{8}
(Jordan) A Shelbayh	4	6^{6}

Quarterfinals
7/Alt	(United States) M Damm	7	4	7
3	(Japan) J Trotter	5	6	5
Q	(United States) S Banerjee	6	6
(United States) T Zink	3	1

Semifinals
7/Alt	(United States) M Damm	6	6
Q	(United States) S Banerjee	4	2
