= 2025 Columbus Challenger =

- Date: September 15–21
- Edition: 15th
- Surface: Hard (indoor)
- Location: Columbus, United States
- Venue: Ohio State Varsity Tennis Center

Champions

Singles
- (United States) Michael Zheng

Doubles
- (Australia) Patrick Harper / (United Kingdom) Johannus Monday
- Columbus Challenger

The 2025 Columbus Challenger was a professional tennis tournament played on indoor hard courts. It was the 15th edition of the men's tournament which was part of the 2025 ATP Challenger Tour. It took place in Columbus, United States between September 15 and 21, 2025.

== Singles main draw entrants ==
=== Seeds ===
Country	Player	Rank^{1}	Seed
ARG	Juan Pablo Ficovich	132	1
USA	Murphy Cassone	177	2
JPN	James Trotter	187	3
COL	Nicolás Mejía	200	4
GBR	Johannus Monday	238	5
USA	Andres Martin	270	6
USA	Martin Damm	281	7
USA	Garrett Johns	293	8

- ^{1} Rankings are as of September 8, 2025.

=== Other entrants ===
The following players received entry into the singles main draw as wildcards:

- (United States) Jack Anthrop
- (United States) Alexander Bernard
- (United States) Aidan Kim

The following player received entry into the singles main draw using a protected ranking:

- (Australia) Philip Sekulic

The following player received entry into the singles main draw through the Junior Accelerator programme:

- (France) Théo Papamalamis

The following players received entry into the singles main draw as alternates;

- (Czech Republic) Petr Brunclík
- (United States) Martin Damm

The following players received entry from the qualifying draw:

- (United States) Samir Banerjee
- (Canada) Justin Boulais
- (Slovenia) Sebastian Dominko
- (France) Antoine Ghibaudo
- (Germany) Daniel Masur
- (United States) Preston Stearns

== Champions ==
=== Singles ===
- (United States) Michael Zheng def. (United States) Martin Damm 3–6, 6–3, 7–5.

=== Doubles ===
- (Australia) Patrick Harper / (United Kingdom) Johannus Monday def. (United States) George Goldhoff / (United States) Theodore Winegar 6–4, 6–3.
