= 2024 Columbus Challenger – Doubles =

Doubles
- 2024 Columbus Challenger

Final
- Champions: (Mexico) Hans Hach Verdugo (Japan) James Trotter
- Runners-up: (United States) Christian Harrison (United States) Ethan Quinn
- Score: 6–4, 6–7^{(6–8)}, [11–9]

Events
Singles	Doubles
- Columbus Challenger

Robert Cash and James Trotter were the defending champions but only Trotter chose to defend his title, partnering Hans Hach Verdugo. Trotter successfully defended his title after he and Hach Verdugo defeated Christian Harrison and Ethan Quinn 6–4, 6–7^{(6–8)}, [11–9] in the final.

== Seeds ==
1. (Denmark) Johannes Ingildsen / (United Kingdom) David Stevenson (withdrew)
2. (Mexico) Hans Hach Verdugo / (Japan) James Trotter (champions)
3. (Australia) Luke Saville / (Australia) Tristan Schoolkate (semifinals)
4. (United States) Mac Kiger / (Canada) Benjamin Sigouin (first round)
5. (United States) Trey Hilderbrand / (United States) Alex Lawson (first round)

== Draw ==
Key

- Q = Qualifier
- WC = Wild card
- LL = Lucky loser
- Alt = Alternate
- ITF = ITF entry
- PR = Protected ranking
- SR = Special ranking
- SE = Special exempt
- JE = Junior exempt
- JR = Junior Accelerator Programme entrant
- CO = College Accelerator Programme entrant
- NG = Next Gen Accelerator Program entrant
- w/o = Walkover
- r = Retired
- d = Defaulted

=== Draw ===
First round
5	(United States) T Hilderbrand (United States) A Lawson	6	1	[5]
(United States) C Harrison (United States) E Quinn	3	6	[10]
(Ecuador) A Andrade (Jordan) A Shelbayh	5	6	[10]
(Canada) K Stevenson (Germany) P Zahraj	7	2	[7]
4	(United States) M Kiger (Canada) B Sigouin	6	6^{4}	[8]
(United States) JJ Tracy (Czech Republic) M Vocel	2	7^{7}	[10]
Alt	(United States) B Kuzuhara (United States) Christian Langmo	2	2
(Australia) P Harper (Australia) C Puttergill	6	6
(Australia) K Pearson (United States) J Sheehy	7^{7}	6^{3}	[4]
(United States) C Kingsley (United States) P Trhac	6^{5}	7^{7}	[10]
(United Kingdom) K Edmund (United Kingdom) R Peniston	2	6^{6}
3	(Australia) L Saville (Australia) T Schoolkate	6	7^{8}
(United States) T Boyer (United States) Tennyson Whiting	6^{3}	6^{4}
WC	(United States) NS Filin (United States) Aidan Kim	7^{7}	7^{7}
WC	(United States) B Carpico (United States) Alex Fuchs	4	2
2	(Mexico) H Hach Verdugo (Japan) J Trotter	6	6

Quarterfinals
(United States) C Harrison (United States) E Quinn	w/o
(Ecuador) A Andrade (Jordan) A Shelbayh
(United States) JJ Tracy (Czech Republic) M Vocel	6^{5}	6	[8]
(Australia) P Harper (Australia) C Puttergill	7^{7}	4	[10]
(United States) C Kingsley (United States) P Trhac	6^{5}	2
3	(Australia) L Saville (Australia) T Schoolkate	7^{7}	6
WC	(United States) NS Filin (United States) A Kim	4	5
2	(Mexico) H Hach Verdugo (Japan) J Trotter	6	7

Semifinals
(United States) C Harrison (United States) E Quinn	6	6
(Australia) P Harper (Australia) C Puttergill	3	4
3	(Australia) L Saville (Australia) T Schoolkate	3	2
2	(Mexico) H Hach Verdugo (Japan) J Trotter	6	6

Final
(United States) C Harrison (United States) E Quinn	4	7^{8}	[9]
2	(Mexico) H Hach Verdugo (Japan) J Trotter	6	6^{6}	[11]
