= 2022 Columbus Challenger =

- Date: January 24–30
- Edition: 11th
- Draw: 32S / 16D
- Prize money: $52,080
- Surface: Hard (indoor)
- Location: Columbus, United States
- Venue: Ohio State Varsity Tennis Center

Champions

Singles
- (Japan) Yoshihito Nishioka

Doubles
- (United States) Tennys Sandgren / (Denmark) Mikael Torpegaard
← 2021 ·	Columbus Challenger	· 2022 →

The 2022 Columbus Challenger was a professional tennis tournament played on indoor hard courts. It was the eleventh edition of the men's tournament which was part of the 2022 ATP Challenger Tour. It took place in Columbus, United States between January 24 and 30 2022.

== Champions ==
=== Singles ===
- (Japan) Yoshihito Nishioka def. (Switzerland) Dominic Stricker 6–2, 6–4.

=== Doubles ===
- (United States) Tennys Sandgren / (Denmark) Mikael Torpegaard def. (Switzerland) Luca Margaroli / (Japan) Yasutaka Uchiyama 5–7, 6–4, [10–5].

== Singles main draw entrants ==
=== Seeds ===
Country	Player	Rank^{1}	Seed
USA	Jenson Brooksby	58	1
USA	Tennys Sandgren	94	2
JPN	Yoshihito Nishioka	119	3
AUT	Jurij Rodionov	137	4
USA	Ernesto Escobedo	141	5
ECU	Emilio Gómez	153	6
USA	Jack Sock	157	7
USA	Bjorn Fratangelo	158	8

- ^{1} Rankings are as of January 17, 2022.

=== Other entrants ===
The following players received entry into the singles main draw as wildcards:

- (United States) Jack Anthrop
- (United States) Alexander Bernard
- (United States) Jenson Brooksby

The following player received entry into the singles main draw using a protected ranking:

- (Chinese Taipei) Wu Tung-lin

The following players received entry from the qualifying draw:

- (Germany) Sebastian Fanselow
- (Dominican Republic) Nick Hardt
- (United States) Ryan Harrison
- (Colombia) Nicolás Mejía
- (Ecuador) Roberto Quiroz
- (Japan) Yosuke Watanuki
