= 2018 Columbus Challenger – Singles =

Singles
- 2018 Columbus Challenger

Final
- Champion: (United States) Michael Mmoh
- Runner-up: (Australia) Jordan Thompson
- Score: 6–3, 7–6^{(7–4)}

Events
Singles	Doubles
- Columbus Challenger

Ante Pavić was the defending champion but chose not to defend his title.

Michael Mmoh won the title after defeating Jordan Thompson 6–3, 7–6^{(7–4)} in the final.

== Seeds ==
1. (Australia) Jordan Thompson (final)
2. (Canada) Peter Polansky (second round)
3. (United States) Michael Mmoh (champion)
4. (United States) Reilly Opelka (withdrew)
5. (Germany) Dominik Köpfer (quarterfinals)
6. (Australia) Alexei Popyrin (quarterfinals)
7. (Ecuador) Roberto Quiroz (semifinals)
8. (Australia) Maverick Banes (first round)

== Draw ==
Key

- Q = Qualifier
- WC = Wild card
- LL = Lucky loser
- Alt = Alternate
- ITF = ITF entry
- PR = Protected ranking
- SR = Special ranking
- SE = Special exempt
- JE = Junior exempt
- JR = Junior Accelerator Programme entrant
- CO = College Accelerator Programme entrant
- NG = Next Gen Accelerator Program entrant
- w/o = Walkover
- r = Retired
- d = Defaulted

=== Finals ===
Semifinals
1	(Australia) Jordan Thompson	5	7^{7}	7^{7}
7	(Ecuador) Roberto Quiroz	7	6^{4}	6^{4}
3	(United States) Michael Mmoh	7	6
WC	(Denmark) Mikael Torpegaard	5	3

Final
1	(Australia) Jordan Thompson	3	6^{4}
3	(United States) Michael Mmoh	6	7^{7}

=== Top half ===
First round
1	(Australia) J Thompson	6	7
Q	(United States) Evan Song	0	5
(Dominican Republic) R Cid Subervi	6^{4}	6^{3}
(Japan) K Uchida	7^{7}	7^{7}
Q	(United States) R Shane	6^{5}	5
WC	(United States) J McNally	7^{7}	7
LL	(Spain) D Pérez Sanz	1	0
5	(Germany) D Köpfer	6	6
Q	(Australia) L Saville	7	6
(Colombia) A González	5	4
(Dominican Republic) J Hernández-Fernández	6	6
(Australia) A Harris	4	1
(United States) T Paul	6	6
(United States) E King	3	4
(Australia) J-P Smith	6	6^{4}	6^{7}
7	(Ecuador) R Quiroz	3	7^{7}	7^{9}

Second round
1	(Australia) J Thompson	6	7^{7}
(Japan) K Uchida	1	6^{2}
WC	(United States) J McNally	4	6	4
5	(Germany) D Köpfer	6	4	6
Q	(Australia) L Saville	6	2	7
(Dominican Republic) J Hernández-Fernández	4	6	5
(United States) T Paul	6^{4}	6	6^{6}
7	(Ecuador) R Quiroz	7^{7}	3	7^{8}

Quarterfinals
1	(Australia) J Thompson	4	6	6
5	(Germany) D Köpfer	6	1	3
Q	(Australia) L Saville	3	1
7	(Ecuador) R Quiroz	6	6

Semifinals
1	(Australia) J Thompson	5	7^{7}	7^{7}
7	(Ecuador) R Quiroz	7	6^{4}	6^{4}

=== Bottom half ===
First round
6	(Australia) A Popyrin	4	7^{7}	7
(Spain) R Ortega Olmedo	6	6^{3}	5
(Canada) S Diez	6	6
(United States) M Giron	3	4
SE	(Australia) J Duckworth	7^{9}	6^{6}	3
(Ecuador) E Gómez	6^{7}	7^{8}	6
(United States) S Bangoura	6	1	2
3	(United States) M Mmoh	3	6	6
8	(Australia) M Banes	6^{3}	4
WC	(Denmark) M Torpegaard	7^{7}	6
WC	(United States) J. J. Wolf	7	6
(Germany) J Choinski	5	4
(France) V Millot	2	4
Q	(United States) T-S Kwiatkowski	6	6
WC	(United States) Martin Joyce	3	7^{13}	1
2	(Canada) P Polansky	6	6^{11}	6

Second round
6	(Australia) A Popyrin	6	7
(Canada) S Diez	3	5
(Ecuador) E Gómez	3	2
3	(United States) M Mmoh	6	6
WC	(Denmark) M Torpegaard	6	6
WC	(United States) J. J. Wolf	1	4
Q	(United States) T-S Kwiatkowski	7^{7}	2	7^{9}
2	(Canada) P Polansky	6^{5}	6	6^{7}

Quarterfinals
6	(Australia) A Popyrin	4	3
3	(United States) M Mmoh	6	6
WC	(Denmark) M Torpegaard	6	6
Q	(United States) T-S Kwiatkowski	4	2

Semifinals
3	(United States) M Mmoh	7	6
WC	(Denmark) M Torpegaard	5	3
