= 2024 Columbus Challenger =

- Date: September 16–22
- Edition: 14th
- Surface: Hard (indoor)
- Location: Columbus, United States
- Venue: Ohio State Varsity Tennis Center

Champions

Singles
- (Japan) Naoki Nakagawa

Doubles
- (Mexico) Hans Hach Verdugo / (Japan) James Trotter
- Columbus Challenger

The 2024 Columbus Challenger was a professional tennis tournament played on indoor hard courts. It was the 14th edition of the men's tournament which was part of the 2024 ATP Challenger Tour. It took place in Columbus, United States between September 16 and 22, 2024.

== Singles main draw entrants ==
=== Seeds ===
Country	Player	Rank^{1}	Seed
USA	Christopher Eubanks	118	1
AUS	Tristan Schoolkate	167	2
USA	Patrick Kypson	168	3
USA	J. J. Wolf	169	4
USA	Denis Kudla	188	5
JOR	Abdullah Shelbayh	204	6
USA	Brandon Holt	208	7
CAN	Alexis Galarneau	218	8

- ^{1} Rankings are as of September 9, 2024.

=== Other entrants ===
The following players received entry into the singles main draw as wildcards:

- (United States) Jack Anthrop
- (United States) Alexander Bernard
- (United States) Bryce Nakashima

The following player received entry into the singles main draw as an alternate:

- (Japan) Naoki Nakagawa

The following players received entry from the qualifying draw:

- (United States) Micah Braswell
- (United States) Murphy Cassone
- (United Kingdom) Kyle Edmund
- (France) Antoine Ghibaudo
- (United Kingdom) Jack Pinnington Jones
- (Germany) Patrick Zahraj

== Champions ==
=== Singles ===
- (Japan) Naoki Nakagawa def. (Japan) James Trotter 7–6^{(10–8)}, 5–7, 7–6^{(7–5)}.

=== Doubles ===
- (Mexico) Hans Hach Verdugo / (Japan) James Trotter def. (United States) Christian Harrison / (United States) Ethan Quinn 6–4, 6–7^{(6–8)}, [11–9].
