= 2024 Challenger La Manche – Singles =

Singles
- 2024 Challenger La Manche

Final
- Champion: (Hungary) Zsombor Piros
- Runner-up: (France) Matteo Martineau
- Score: 6–3, 6–4

Events
| Singles | Doubles |
- Challenger La Manche

Giulio Zeppieri was the defending champion but chose not to defend his title.

Zsombor Piros won the title after defeating Matteo Martineau 6–3, 6–4 in the final.

== Seeds ==
1. (United States) Brandon Nakashima (second round)
2. (France) Quentin Halys (semifinals)
3. (France) Benoît Paire (second round)
4. (Hungary) Zsombor Piros (champion)
5. (France) Titouan Droguet (quarterfinals)
6. (United Kingdom) Jan Choinski (first round)
7. (France) Pierre-Hugues Herbert (withdrew)
8. (France) Antoine Escoffier (first round)

== Draw ==
Key

- Q = Qualifier
- WC = Wild card
- LL = Lucky loser
- Alt = Alternate
- ITF = ITF entry
- PR = Protected ranking
- SR = Special ranking
- SE = Special exempt
- JE = Junior exempt
- JR = Junior Accelerator Programme entrant
- CO = College Accelerator Programme entrant
- NG = Next Gen Accelerator Program entrant
- w/o = Walkover
- r = Retired
- d = Defaulted

=== Finals ===
Semifinals
(Belgium) Michael Geerts | 5 | 4
(France) Matteo Martineau | 7 | 6
4 | (Hungary) Zsombor Piros | 7^{7} | 6
2/WC | (France) Quentin Halys | 6^{5} | 3

Final
(France) Matteo Martineau | 3 | 4
4 | (Hungary) Zsombor Piros | 6 | 6

=== Top half ===
First round
1 | (United States) B Nakashima | 6 | 6
(France) V Royer | 4 | 4
(Germany) O Otte | 7^{7} | 3 | 4
(Belgium) M Geerts | 6^{5} | 6 | 6
(Romania) M Copil | 3 | 4
(France) L Poullain | 6 | 6
(Estonia) M Lajal | 6 | 6
LL | (France) Alexis Gautier | 3 | 3
3/WC | (France) B Paire | 7 | 6
(France) G Mpetshi Perricard | 5 | 4
(France) M Martineau | 6 | 3 | 6
WC | (France) Maé Malige | 2 | 6 | 1
A Kachmazov | 7 | 2 | 6
Q | (Belgium) B Gadamauri | 5 | 6 | 2
Q | (France) T Lamasine | 6 | 3 | 7^{7}
6 | (United Kingdom) J Choinski | 4 | 6 | 6^{3}

Second round
1 | (United States) B Nakashima | 4 | 4
(Belgium) M Geerts | 6 | 6
(France) L Poullain | 6^{5} | 1
(Estonia) M Lajal | 7^{7} | 6
3/WC | (France) B Paire | 1 | 4
(France) M Martineau | 6 | 6
A Kachmazov | 6 | 6
Q | (France) T Lamasine | 3 | 4

Quarterfinals
(Belgium) M Geerts | 6 | 6
(Estonia) M Lajal | 1 | 3
(France) M Martineau | 6 | 6
A Kachmazov | 2 | 4

Semifinals
(Belgium) M Geerts | 5 | 4
(France) M Martineau | 7 | 6

=== Bottom half ===
First round
8 | (France) A Escoffier | 7^{8} | 2 | 0
(France) Jules Marie | 6^{6} | 6 | 6
(United States) M Damm | 6^{4} | 1
Q | Nikolay Vylegzhanin | 7^{7} | 6
(Italy) L Giustino | 6^{1} | 3
(Italy) M Bellucci | 7^{7} | 6
Q | (Italy) L Rottoli | 1 | 2
4 | (Hungary) Z Piros | 6 | 6
5 | (France) T Droguet | 7^{7} | 6
Q | (Japan) J Trotter | 6^{5} | 4
(Lithuania) R Berankis | 6 | 4 | 7
(Germany) H Squire | 3 | 6 | 5
(Czech Republic) Z Kolář | 4 | 2
Q | (Syria) H Naw | 6 | 6
(Canada) A Galarneau | 4 | 4
2/WC | (France) Q Halys | 6 | 6

Second round
(France) J Marie | 6 | 3 | 2
Q | N Vylegzhanin | 1 | 6 | 6
(Italy) M Bellucci | 3 | 5
4 | (Hungary) Z Piros | 6 | 7
5 | (France) T Droguet | 6 | 6
(Lithuania) R Berankis | 2 | 3
Q | (Syria) H Naw | 3 | 6^{3}
2/WC | (France) Q Halys | 6 | 7^{7}

Quarterfinals
Q | N Vylegzhanin | 4 | 6 | 4
4 | (Hungary) Z Piros | 6 | 4 | 6
5 | (France) T Droguet | 5 | 6 | 3
2/WC | (France) Q Halys | 7 | 4 | 6

Semifinals
4 | (Hungary) Z Piros | 7^{7} | 6
2/WC | (France) Q Halys | 6^{5} | 3
