= 2024 Challenger La Manche – Doubles =

Doubles
- 2024 Challenger La Manche

Final
- Champions: (United States) George Goldhoff (Japan) James Trotter
- Runners-up: (Netherlands) Ryan Nijboer (Germany) Niklas Schell
- Score: 6–2, 6–3

Events
Singles	Doubles
← 2023 ·	Challenger La Manche	· 2025 →

Ivan Liutarevich and Vladyslav Manafov were the defending champions but lost in the semifinals to Ryan Nijboer and Niklas Schell.

George Goldhoff and James Trotter won the title after defeating Nijboer and Schell 6–2, 6–3 in the final.

== Seeds ==
1. (Germany) Constantin Frantzen / (Germany) Hendrik Jebens (first round)
2. Ivan Liutarevich / (Ukraine) Vladyslav Manafov (semifinals)
3. (France) Jonathan Eysseric / (United States) Christian Harrison (semifinals)
4. (Czech Republic) Zdeněk Kolář / (Poland) Szymon Walków (quarterfinals)

== Draw ==
Key

- Q = Qualifier
- WC = Wild card
- LL = Lucky loser
- Alt = Alternate
- ITF = ITF entry
- PR = Protected ranking
- SR = Special ranking
- SE = Special exempt
- JE = Junior exempt
- JR = Junior Accelerator Programme entrant
- CO = College Accelerator Programme entrant
- NG = Next Gen Accelerator Program entrant
- w/o = Walkover
- r = Retired
- d = Defaulted

First round
1	(Germany) C Frantzen (Germany) H Jebens	6^{6}	4
(Belgium) M Geerts (Austria) N Oberleitner	7^{8}	6
(Estonia) D Glinka (Estonia) Karl Kiur Saar
(United States) G Goldhoff (Japan) J Trotter	w/o
3	(France) J Eysseric (United States) C Harrison	6	6
A Vatutin; Nikolay Vylegzhanin	2	4
(France) A Escoffier (United Kingdom) J Paris	7	3	[7]
(France) A Hoang (France) G Jacq	5	6	[10]
(Sweden) S Freund (Denmark) J Ingildsen	4	6	[8]
(Netherlands) Ryan Nijboer (Germany) Niklas Schell	6	3	[10]
(Switzerland) R Bertola (Italy) G Ricca	3	5
4	(Czech Republic) Z Kolář (Poland) S Walków	6	7
(South Korea) J-s Nam (Canada) K Stevenson	4	4
(Italy) M Bellucci (France) G Mpetshi Perricard	6	6
WC	(France) Joffrey de Schepper (France) K de Schepper	4	3
2	I Liutarevich (Ukraine) V Manafov	6	6

Quarterfinals
(Belgium) M Geerts (Austria) N Oberleitner	2	4
(United States) G Goldhoff (Japan) J Trotter	6	6
3	(France) J Eysseric (United States) C Harrison	6	6
(France) A Hoang (France) G Jacq	1	4
(Netherlands) R Nijboer (Germany) N Schell	2	6	[10]
4	(Czech Republic) Z Kolář (Poland) S Walków	6	3	[7]
(Italy) M Bellucci (France) G Mpetshi Perricard	6	6^{2}	[7]
2	I Liutarevich (Ukraine) V Manafov	3	7^{7}	[10]

Semifinals
(United States) G Goldhoff (Japan) J Trotter	7^{7}	6
3	(France) J Eysseric (United States) C Harrison	6^{5}	4
(Netherlands) R Nijboer (Germany) N Schell	7	7
2	I Liutarevich (Ukraine) V Manafov	5	5

Final
(United States) G Goldhoff (Japan) J Trotter	6	6
(Netherlands) R Nijboer (Germany) N Schell	2	3
