= 2024 Challenger La Manche =

- Date: 12–18 February
- Edition: 31st
- Surface: Hard (indoor)
- Location: Cherbourg, France

Champions

Singles
- (Hungary) Zsombor Piros

Doubles
- (United States) George Goldhoff / (Japan) James Trotter
- Challenger La Manche

The 2024 Challenger La Manche was a professional tennis tournament played on indoor hard courts. It was the 31st edition of the tournament which was part of the 2024 ATP Challenger Tour. It took place in Cherbourg, France between 12 and 18 February 2024.

== Singles main-draw entrants ==
=== Seeds ===
Country	Player	Rank^{1}	Seed
USA	Brandon Nakashima	91	1
FRA	Quentin Halys	101	2
FRA	Benoît Paire	110	3
HUN	Zsombor Piros	129	4
FRA	Titouan Droguet	157	5
GBR	Jan Choinski	161	6
~~FRA~~	~~Pierre-Hugues Herbert~~	~~168~~	~~7~~
FRA	Antoine Escoffier	171	8

- ^{1} Rankings are as of 5 February 2024.

=== Other entrants ===
The following players received wildcards into the singles main draw:

- (France) Quentin Halys
- (France) Maé Malige
- (France) Benoît Paire

The following players received entry from the qualifying draw:

- (Belgium) Buvaysar Gadamauri
- (France) Tristan Lamasine
- (Syria) Hazem Naw
- (Italy) Lorenzo Rottoli
- (Japan) James Trotter
- Nikolay Vylegzhanin

The following player received entry as a lucky loser:

- (France) Alexis Gautier

== Champions ==
=== Singles ===
- (Hungary) Zsombor Piros def. (France) Matteo Martineau 6–3, 6–4.

=== Doubles ===
- (United States) George Goldhoff / (Japan) James Trotter def. (Netherlands) Ryan Nijboer / (Germany) Niklas Schell 6–2, 6–3.
