= 2018 Columbus Challenger =

- Date: 17–23 September
- Edition: 5th
- Draw: 32S / 16D
- Surface: Hard / Indoors
- Location: Columbus, United States

Champions

Singles
- (United States) Michael Mmoh

Doubles
- (United States) Tommy Paul / (Canada) Peter Polansky
- Columbus Challenger

The 2018 Columbus Challenger was a professional tennis tournament played on indoor hard courts. It was the fifth edition of the tournament which was part of the 2018 ATP Challenger Tour. It took place in Columbus, United States between 17 and 23 September 2018.

== Singles main draw entrants ==
=== Seeds ===
Country	Player	Rank^{1}	Seed
AUS	Jordan Thompson	111	1
CAN	Peter Polansky	112	2
USA	Michael Mmoh	122	3
USA	Reilly Opelka	143	4
GER	Dominik Köpfer	188	5
AUS	Alexei Popyrin	194	6
ECU	Roberto Quiroz	213	7
AUS	Maverick Banes	220	8

- ^{1} Rankings are as of September 10, 2018.

=== Other entrants ===
The following players received entry into the singles main draw as wildcards:

- (United States) Martin Joyce
- (United States) John McNally
- (Denmark) Mikael Torpegaard
- (United States) J. J. Wolf

The following player received entry into the singles main draw as a special exempt:

- (Australia) James Duckworth

The following players received entry from the qualifying draw:

- (United States) Thai-Son Kwiatkowski
- (Australia) Luke Saville
- (United States) Ryan Shane
- (United States) Evan Song

The following player received entry as a lucky loser:

- (Spain) David Pérez Sanz

== Champions ==
=== Singles ===
- (United States) Michael Mmoh def. (Australia) Jordan Thompson 6–3, 7–6^{(7–4)}.

=== Doubles ===
- (United States) Tommy Paul / (Canada) Peter Polansky def. (Ecuador) Gonzalo Escobar / (Ecuador) Roberto Quiroz 6–3, 6–3.
