= 2022 Columbus Challenger – Doubles =

Doubles
- 2022 Columbus Challenger

Final
- Champions: (United States) Tennys Sandgren (Denmark) Mikael Torpegaard
- Runners-up: (Switzerland) Luca Margaroli (Japan) Yasutaka Uchiyama
- Score: 5–7, 6–4, [10–5]

Events
Singles	Doubles
← 2021 ·	Columbus Challenger	· 2022 →

Stefan Kozlov and Peter Polansky were the defending champions but withdrew from the tournament due to a Kozlov injury.

Tennys Sandgren and Mikael Torpegaard won the title after defeating Luca Margaroli and Yasutaka Uchiyama 5–7, 6–4, [10–5] in the final.

== Seeds ==
1. (United States) Robert Galloway / (United States) Jackson Withrow (quarterfinals)
2. (United States) Evan King / (United States) Alex Lawson (quarterfinals)
3. (United States) William Blumberg / (United States) Max Schnur (first round)
4. (United States) James Cerretani / (Philippines) Ruben Gonzales (quarterfinals)

== Draw ==
=== Key ===
- Q = Qualifier
- WC = Wild card
- LL = Lucky loser
- Alt = Alternate
- SE = Special exempt
- PR = Protected ranking
- ITF = ITF entry
- JE = Junior exempt
- w/o = Walkover
- r = Retired
- d = Defaulted
- SR = Special ranking

First round
1	(United States) R Galloway (United States) J Withrow	6	6
(United States) JC Aragone (United States) C Harrison	4	2
(United States) T Sandgren (Denmark) M Torpegaard	6	6^{5}	[10]
Alt	(Japan) G Soeda (Japan) Yo Watanuki	4	7^{7}	[1]
4	(United States) J Cerretani (Philippines) R Gonzales	3	6	[12]
WC	(United States) Jack Anthrop (United States) Alexander Bernard	6	3	[10]
(United States) B Fratangelo (Ecuador) E Gómez	6	6^{3}	[10]
Alt	(France) G Blancaneaux (Germany) N Kuhn	3	7^{7}	[4]
WC	(United States) Chad Miller (United States) Bjorn Swenson	7^{7}	0	[4]
(United States) E Escobedo (Austria) J Rodionov	6^{5}	6	[10]
(United States) M Krueger (United States) J Sock	7^{8}	6
3	(United States) W Blumberg (United States) M Schnur	6^{6}	2
(Switzerland) L Margaroli (Japan) Y Uchiyama	6	7^{7}
(Ecuador) R Quiroz (Canada) B Schnur	3	6^{4}
(United States) A Rybakov (United States) R Stalder	5	1
2	(United States) E King (United States) A Lawson	7	6

Quarterfinals
1	(United States) R Galloway (United States) J Withrow	6	3	[12]
(United States) T Sandgren (Denmark) M Torpegaard	4	6	[14]
4	(United States) J Cerretani (Philippines) R Gonzales	6^{8}	6	[6]
(United States) B Fratangelo (Ecuador) E Gómez	7^{10}	4	[10]
(United States) E Escobedo (Austria) J Rodionov	w/o
(United States) M Krueger (United States) J Sock
(Switzerland) L Margaroli (Japan) Y Uchiyama	7	6
2	(United States) E King (United States) A Lawson	5	4

Semifinals
(United States) T Sandgren (Denmark) M Torpegaard	7^{7}	6
(United States) B Fratangelo (Ecuador) E Gómez	6^{5}	4
(United States) E Escobedo (Austria) J Rodionov
(Switzerland) L Margaroli (Japan) Y Uchiyama	w/o

Final
(United States) T Sandgren (Denmark) M Torpegaard	5	6	[10]
(Switzerland) L Margaroli (Japan) Y Uchiyama	7	4	[5]
