= 2023 Columbus Challenger – Doubles =

Doubles
- 2023 Columbus Challenger

Final
- Champions: (United States) Robert Cash (Japan) James Trotter
- Runners-up: (Argentina) Guido Andreozzi (Mexico) Hans Hach Verdugo
- Score: 6–4, 2–6, [10–7]

Events
Singles	Doubles
- Columbus Challenger

Julian Cash and Henry Patten were the defending champions but chose not to defend their title.

Robert Cash and James Trotter won the title after defeating Guido Andreozzi and Hans Hach Verdugo 6–4, 2–6, [10–7] in the final.

== Seeds ==
1. (Argentina) Guido Andreozzi / (Mexico) Hans Hach Verdugo (final)
2. (United States) William Blumberg / (Venezuela) Luis David Martínez (quarterfinals)
3. (United States) Christian Harrison / (Latvia) Miķelis Lībietis (quarterfinals)
4. (Australia) Tristan Schoolkate / (Australia) Adam Walton (semifinals)

== Draw ==
Key

- Q = Qualifier
- WC = Wild card
- LL = Lucky loser
- Alt = Alternate
- ITF = ITF entry
- PR = Protected ranking
- SR = Special ranking
- SE = Special exempt
- JE = Junior exempt
- JR = Junior Accelerator Programme entrant
- CO = College Accelerator Programme entrant
- NG = Next Gen Accelerator Program entrant
- w/o = Walkover
- r = Retired
- d = Defaulted

First round
1	(Argentina) G Andreozzi (Mexico) H Hach Verdugo	7	6
(United States) A Rybakov (United Kingdom) C Thomson	5	3
(United States) Ezekiel Clark (United States) C Kingsley	7^{7}	4	[10]
(Australia) C Puttergill (Australia) A Taylor	6^{4}	6	[7]
3	(United States) C Harrison (Latvia) M Lībietis	6	7^{7}
(United States) G Goldhoff (United States) M Kiger	1	6^{5}
(Tunisia) A Dougaz (Germany) Elmar Ejupovic	1	2
Alt	(United States) A Perez (United States) E Quinn	6	6
WC	(United States) Jack Anthrop (United States) Alexander Bernard	6^{13}	1
(United States) M Krueger (United States) D Kudla	7^{15}	6
(Argentina) FA Gómez (Canada) K Stevenson	5	3
4	(Australia) T Schoolkate (Australia) A Walton	7	6
WC	(United States) R Cash (Japan) J Trotter	6	6
(Belgium) M Geerts (United States) V Kirkov	3	4
(United States) A Lawson (Finland) E Vasa	5	6	[5]
2	(United States) W Blumberg (Venezuela) LD Martínez	7	2	[10]

Quarterfinals
1	(Argentina) G Andreozzi (Mexico) H Hach Verdugo	3	6	[11]
(United States) E Clark (United States) C Kingsley	6	1	[9]
3	(United States) C Harrison (Latvia) M Lībietis	4	3
Alt	(United States) A Perez (United States) E Quinn	6	6
(United States) M Krueger (United States) D Kudla	6^{5}	6^{1}
4	(Australia) T Schoolkate (Australia) A Walton	7^{7}	7^{7}
WC	(United States) R Cash (Japan) J Trotter	7^{7}	6
2	(United States) W Blumberg (Venezuela) LD Martínez	6^{3}	3

Semifinals
1	(Argentina) G Andreozzi (Mexico) H Hach Verdugo	6	6
Alt	(United States) A Perez (United States) E Quinn	3	4
4	(Australia) T Schoolkate (Australia) A Walton	6	6^{5}	[9]
WC	(United States) R Cash (Japan) J Trotter	4	7^{7}	[11]

Final
1	(Argentina) G Andreozzi (Mexico) H Hach Verdugo	4	6	[7]
WC	(United States) R Cash (Japan) J Trotter	6	2	[10]
