= 2022 Columbus Challenger – Singles =

Singles
- 2022 Columbus Challenger

Final
- Champion: (Japan) Yoshihito Nishioka
- Runner-up: (Switzerland) Dominic Stricker
- Score: 6–2, 6–4

Events
| Singles | Doubles |
| ← 2021 · | Columbus Challenger | · 2022 → |

Stefan Kozlov was the defending champion but lost in the second round to Dominic Stricker.

Yoshihito Nishioka won the title after defeating Stricker 6–2, 6–4 in the final.

== Seeds ==
1. (United States) Jenson Brooksby (semifinals)
2. (United States) Tennys Sandgren (first round)
3. (Japan) Yoshihito Nishioka (champion)
4. (Austria) Jurij Rodionov (semifinals)
5. (United States) Ernesto Escobedo (quarterfinals)
6. (Ecuador) Emilio Gómez (quarterfinals)
7. (United States) Jack Sock (quarterfinals, withdrew)
8. (United States) Bjorn Fratangelo (second round)

== Draw ==
=== Key ===
- Q = Qualifier
- WC = Wild card
- LL = Lucky loser
- Alt = Alternate
- SE = Special exempt
- PR = Protected ranking
- ITF = ITF entry
- JE = Junior exempt
- w/o = Walkover
- r = Retired
- d = Defaulted
- SR = Special ranking

=== Finals ===
Semifinals
1/WC | (United States) Jenson Brooksby | 3 | 4
3 | (Japan) Yoshihito Nishioka | 6 | 6
4 | (Austria) Jurij Rodionov | 4 | 6 | 4
(Switzerland) Dominic Stricker | 6 | 2 | 6

Final
3 | (Japan) Yoshihito Nishioka | 6 | 6
(Switzerland) Dominic Stricker | 2 | 4

=== Top half ===
First round
1/WC | (United States) J Brooksby | 2 | 6 | 7
(United States) M Krueger | 6 | 3 | 5
(Uzbekistan) D Istomin | 7 | 1 | 6
Q | (Germany) S Fanselow | 5 | 6 | 4
(United States) U Blanch | 7^{9} | 6
Q | (Ecuador) R Quiroz | 6^{7} | 4
(Chinese Taipei) J Jung | 1 | 4
5 | (United States) E Escobedo | 6 | 6
3 | (Japan) Y Nishioka | 6 | 6
Q | (Japan) Yo Watanuki | 4 | 4
(United States) J. J. Wolf | 6 | 6
WC | (United States) Jack Anthrop | 0 | 3
(Japan) Y Uchiyama | 6^{6} | 4
(Germany) N Kuhn | 7^{8} | 6
(France) G Blancaneaux | 5 | 5
6 | (Ecuador) E Gómez | 7 | 7

Second round
1/WC | (United States) J Brooksby | 7 | 6
(Uzbekistan) D Istomin | 5 | 1
(United States) U Blanch | 6^{8} | 4
5 | (United States) E Escobedo | 7^{10} | 6
3 | (Japan) Y Nishioka | 6 | 2 | 6
(United States) J. J. Wolf | 2 | 6 | 4
(Germany) N Kuhn | 6^{6} | 5
6 | (Ecuador) E Gómez | 7^{8} | 7

Quarterfinals
1/WC | (United States) J Brooksby | 6 | 1 | 6
5 | (United States) E Escobedo | 4 | 6 | 1
3 | (Japan) Y Nishioka | 6 | 4 | 6
6 | (Ecuador) E Gómez | 1 | 6 | 3

Semifinals
1/WC | (United States) J Brooksby | 3 | 4
3 | (Japan) Y Nishioka | 6 | 6

=== Bottom half ===
First round
8 | (United States) B Fratangelo | 6 | 6
Q | (Colombia) N Mejía | 1 | 2
(Denmark) M Torpegaard | 6 | 7^{7}
(United States) M Mmoh | 4 | 6^{3}
Q | (Dominican Republic) N Hardt | 6 | 7^{7}
Q | (United States) R Harrison | 4 | 6^{3}
(Canada) B Schnur | 4 | 7 | 5
4 | (Austria) J Rodionov | 6 | 5 | 7
7 | (United States) J Sock | 7^{9} | 6^{4} | 6
(United States) C Eubanks | 6^{7} | 7^{7} | 4
(Japan) G Soeda | 7^{7} | 6
PR | (Chinese Taipei) T-l Wu | 6^{5} | 2
WC | (United States) Alexander Bernard | 2 | 1
(United States) S Kozlov | 6 | 6
(Switzerland) D Stricker | 6 | 6^{3} | 7^{7}
2 | (United States) T Sandgren | 4 | 7^{7} | 6^{0}

Second round
8 | (United States) B Fratangelo | 1 | 4
(Denmark) M Torpegaard | 6 | 6
Q | (Dominican Republic) N Hardt | 3 | 2
4 | (Austria) J Rodionov | 6 | 6
7 | (United States) J Sock | 6 | 6
(Japan) G Soeda | 3 | 4
(United States) S Kozlov | 6 | 4 | 3
(Switzerland) D Stricker | 4 | 6 | 6

Quarterfinals
(Denmark) M Torpegaard | 7^{7} | 5 | 3^{r}
4 | (Austria) J Rodionov | 6^{1} | 7 | 4
7 | (United States) J Sock
(Switzerland) D Stricker | w/o

Semifinals
4 | (Austria) J Rodionov | 4 | 6 | 4
(Switzerland) D Stricker | 6 | 2 | 6
