= 2024 Columbus Challenger – Singles =

Singles
- 2024 Columbus Challenger

Final
- Champion: (Japan) Naoki Nakagawa
- Runner-up: (Japan) James Trotter
- Score: 7–6^{(10–8)}, 5–7, 7–6^{(7–5)}

Events
Singles	Doubles
- Columbus Challenger

Denis Kudla was the defending champion but lost in the second round to Tristan Boyer.

Naoki Nakagawa won the title after defeating James Trotter 7–6^{(10–8)}, 5–7, 7–6^{(7–5)} in the final.

== Seeds ==
1. (United States) Christopher Eubanks (quarterfinals)
2. (Australia) Tristan Schoolkate (first round)
3. (United States) Patrick Kypson (first round)
4. (United States) J. J. Wolf (first round)
5. (United States) Denis Kudla (second round)
6. (Jordan) Abdullah Shelbayh (quarterfinals)
7. (United States) Brandon Holt (first round)
8. (Canada) Alexis Galarneau (second round)

== Draw ==
Key

- Q = Qualifier
- WC = Wild card
- LL = Lucky loser
- Alt = Alternate
- ITF = ITF entry
- PR = Protected ranking
- SR = Special ranking
- SE = Special exempt
- JE = Junior exempt
- JR = Junior Accelerator Programme entrant
- CO = College Accelerator Programme entrant
- NG = Next Gen Accelerator Program entrant
- w/o = Walkover
- r = Retired
- d = Defaulted

=== Finals ===
Semifinals
Alt	(Japan) Naoki Nakagawa	7^{7}	0	6
Q	(United Kingdom) Kyle Edmund	6^{5}	6	2
(United States) Nishesh Basavareddy	7^{7}	1	0
(Japan) James Trotter	6^{4}	6	6

Final
Alt	(Japan) Naoki Nakagawa	7^{10}	5	7^{7}
(Japan) James Trotter	6^{8}	7	6^{5}

=== Top half ===
First round
1	(United States) C Eubanks	7	6
(United States) C Williams	5	3
(United States) B Kuzuhara	1	3
(Ecuador) A Andrade	6	6
Q	(United Kingdom) J Pinnington Jones	6^{1}	4
Alt	(Japan) N Nakagawa	7^{7}	6
WC	(United States) Alexander Bernard	6	7^{7}
7	(United States) B Holt	3	6^{4}
4	(United States) JJ Wolf	1	6^{4}
Q	(United Kingdom) K Edmund	6	7^{7}
(Switzerland) D Stricker	6	7
(United Kingdom) R Peniston	3	5
WC	(United States) Jack Anthrop	6	6
Q	(United States) M Cassone	3	4
(United States) E Spizzirri	1	0
6	(Jordan) A Shelbayh	6	6

Second round
1	(United States) C Eubanks	6	7
(Ecuador) A Andrade	3	5
Alt	(Japan) N Nakagawa	6	6
WC	(United States) A Bernard	2	3
Q	(United Kingdom) K Edmund	6	6
(Switzerland) D Stricker	3	3
WC	(United States) J Anthrop	4	4
6	(Jordan) A Shelbayh	6	6

Quarterfinals
1	(United States) C Eubanks	6	6^{4}	6^{4}
Alt	(Japan) N Nakagawa	2	7^{7}	7^{7}
Q	(United Kingdom) K Edmund	7	6
6	(Jordan) A Shelbayh	5	1

Semifinals
Alt	(Japan) N Nakagawa	7^{7}	0	6
Q	(United Kingdom) K Edmund	6^{5}	6	2

=== Bottom half ===
First round
5	(United States) D Kudla	4	6	6
Q	(United States) Micah Braswell	6	1	2
WC	(United States) Bry Nakashima	1	6^{3}
(United States) T Boyer	6	7^{7}
(United States) N Basavareddy	6	6
(France) Jules Marie	3	2
(United States) E Quinn	6	6
3	(United States) P Kypson	4	4
8	(Canada) A Galarneau	6	6
(Australia) D Sweeny	4	1
(Mexico) E Escobedo	6^{4}	6	6
Q	(France) A Ghibaudo	7^{7}	2	4
(United States) A Mayo	6	2	2
(Japan) J Trotter	4	6	6
Q	(Germany) P Zahraj	7^{7}	6
2	(Australia) T Schoolkate	6^{4}	0

Second round
5	(United States) D Kudla	3	4
(United States) T Boyer	6	6
(United States) N Basavareddy	5	7	6
(United States) E Quinn	7	5	2
8	(Canada) A Galarneau	4	4
(Mexico) E Escobedo	6	6
(Japan) J Trotter	7^{7}	6
Q	(Germany) P Zahraj	6^{5}	4

Quarterfinals
(United States) T Boyer	0	2
(United States) N Basavareddy	6	6
(Mexico) E Escobedo	6^{3}	2
(Japan) J Trotter	7^{7}	6

Semifinals
(United States) N Basavareddy	7^{7}	1	0
(Japan) J Trotter	6^{4}	6	6
