= Naoki Nakagawa =

Japanese tennis player (born 1996)

Naoki Nakagawa 中川直樹
- Country (sports): Japan
- Residence: Bradenton, Florida, United States
- Born: 19 November 1996 (age 29) Fukutsu, Fukuoka, Japan
- Height: 1.80 m (5 ft 11 in)
- Plays: Right-handed (two handed-backhand)
- Coach: Kenichi Nakagawa
- Prize money: US $158,024

Singles
- Career record: 0–0
- Career titles: 0
- Highest ranking: No. 327 (23 June 2025)
- Current ranking: No. 608 (14 September 2026)

Doubles
- Career record: 0–0
- Career titles: 0
- Highest ranking: No. 726 (30 July 2018)
- Current ranking: No. 1,176 (14 September 2026)
- Last updated on: 18 September 2026.

Naoki Nakagawa (中川直樹, Nakagawa Naoki; born 19 November 1996) is a Japanese tennis player. He has a career high ATP singles ranking of world No. 327 achieved on 23 June 2025 and a doubles ranking of world No. 726 achieved on 30 July 2018. He won the boys' doubles title at the 2014 US Open with Omar Jasika.

== Career ==
As a teen, Nakagawa reached his highest ranking of world No. 9 in the combined singles and doubles ITF junior ranking system. His junior tenure was highlighted and capped off by winning the boys' doubles title at the 2014 US Open where he alongside Australia's Omar Jasika defeated the Brazilian duo or João Menezes and Rafael Matos in straight sets 6–3, 7–6^{(8–6)}.

Nakagawa won his first ATP Challenger title at the 2024 Columbus Challenger, defeating James Trotter in the final.

== ATP Challenger Tour finals ==
=== Singles: 1 (1 title) ===
Legend ATP Challenger Tour (1–0)

Result	W–L	Date	Tournament	Tier	Surface	Opponent	Score
Win	1–0	Sep 2024	Columbus, USA	Challenger	Hard (i)	(Japan) James Trotter	7–6^{(10–8)}, 5–7, 7–6^{(7–5)}

== ITF Futures/World Tennis Tour finals ==
=== Singles: 14 (5 titles, 9 runner-ups) ===
Legend ITF Futures/WTT (5–9)	Finals by surface Hard (5–5) Clay (0–4) Grass (0–0) Carpet (0–0)

Result	W–L	Date	Tournament	Tier	Surface	Opponent	Score
Win	1–0	Oct 2013	Mexico F13, Veracruz	Futures	Hard	(Colombia) Juan Carlos Spir	6–3, 6–4
Loss	1–1	Nov 2016	USA F37, Pensacola	Futures	Clay	(France) Gianni Mina	6–4, 4–6, 0–6
Loss	1–2	Mar 2017	Croatia F3, Umag	Futures	Clay	(Belgium) Yannick Vandenbulcke	1–6, 2–6
Loss	1–3	Jun 2017	USA F18, Buffalo	Futures	Clay	(United States) Alex Rybakov	6–4, 0–6, 1–6
Loss	1–4	Jan 2018	USA F4, Sunrise	Futures	Clay	(Belgium) Julien Cagnina	7–6^{(7–5)}, 3–6, 3–6
Loss	1–5	Mar 2019	M15 Cancún, Mexico	WTT	Hard	(Peru) Juan Pablo Varillas	6–3, 3–6, 4–6
Win	2–5	Mar 2021	M15 Monastir, Tunisia	WTT	Hard	(Italy) Franco Agamenone	7–6^{(7–3)}, 6–4
Loss	2–6	Oct 2021	M25 Quinta do Lago, Portugal	WTT	Hard	(France) Arthur Cazaux	3–6, 4–6
Win	3–6	Nov 2021	M25 Afula, Israel	WTT	Hard	(Greece) Michail Pervolarakis	4–6, 6–4, 6–3
Loss	3–7	Mar 2023	M25 Quinta do Lago, Portugal	WTT	Hard	(Netherlands) Jesper de Jong	1–6, 7–5, 4–6
Loss	3–8	Aug 2023	M25 Decatur, USA	WTT	Hard	(United States) Cash Hanzlik	6–4, 1–6, 4–6
Win	4–8	Sep 2023	M25 Sapporo, Japan	WTT	Hard	(Japan) Kazuki Nishiwaki	4–6, 6–1, 6–4
Win	5–8	Sep 2023	M25 Takasaki, Japan	WTT	Hard	(Japan) Makoto Ochi	6–2, 7–6^{(7–5)}
Loss	5–9	Sep 2024	M25 Sapporo, Japan	WTT	Hard	(Japan) Kokoro Isomura	3–6, 2–6

=== Doubles: 6 (2 titles, 4 runner-ups) ===
Legend ITF Futures/WTT (2–4)	Finals by surface Hard (2–2) Clay (0–2) Grass (0–0) Carpet (0–0)

Result	W–L	Date	Tournament	Tier	Surface	Partner	Opponents	Score
Loss	0–1	Aug 2016	Germany F10, Wetzlar	Futures	Clay	(Dominican Republic) Roberto Cid Subervi	(Germany) Jannis Kahlke (Germany) Robin Kern	0–6, 2–6
Loss	0–2	Aug 2016	Germany F11, Karlsruhe	Futures	Clay	(Dominican Republic) Roberto Cid Subervi	(Germany) Hannes Wagner (Germany) Johannes Härteis	3–6, 5–7
Win	1–2	Oct 2019	M15 Changwon, South Korea	WTT	Hard	(Japan) Shintaro Mochizuki	(South Korea) Chung Hong (South Korea) Lee Jea-moon	6–4, 6–4
Loss	1–3	Feb 2021	M15 Monastir, Tunisia	WTT	Hard	(Japan) Ryota Tanuma	(Austria) Alexander Erler (Tunisia) Skander Mansouri	0–6, 5–7
Win	2–3	Mar 2021	M15 Monastir, Tunisia	WTT	Hard	(Japan) Ryota Tanuma	(United States) Alexander Kotzen (Republic of Ireland) Simon Carr	6–1, 6–3
Loss	2–4	Nov 2021	M25 Meitar, Israel	WTT	Hard	(Japan) Rio Noguchi	(Finland) Iiro Vasa (Finland) Eero Vasa	1–6, 6–7 ^{(3–7)}

== Junior Grand Slam finals ==
=== Doubles: 1 (1 title) ===
Result	Year	Tournament	Surface	Partner	Opponents	Score
Win	2014	US Open	Hard	(Australia) Omar Jasika	(Brazil) Rafael Matos (Brazil) João Menezes	6–3, 7–6^{(8–6)}
