= Hans Hach Verdugo =

Mexican tennis player (born 1989)

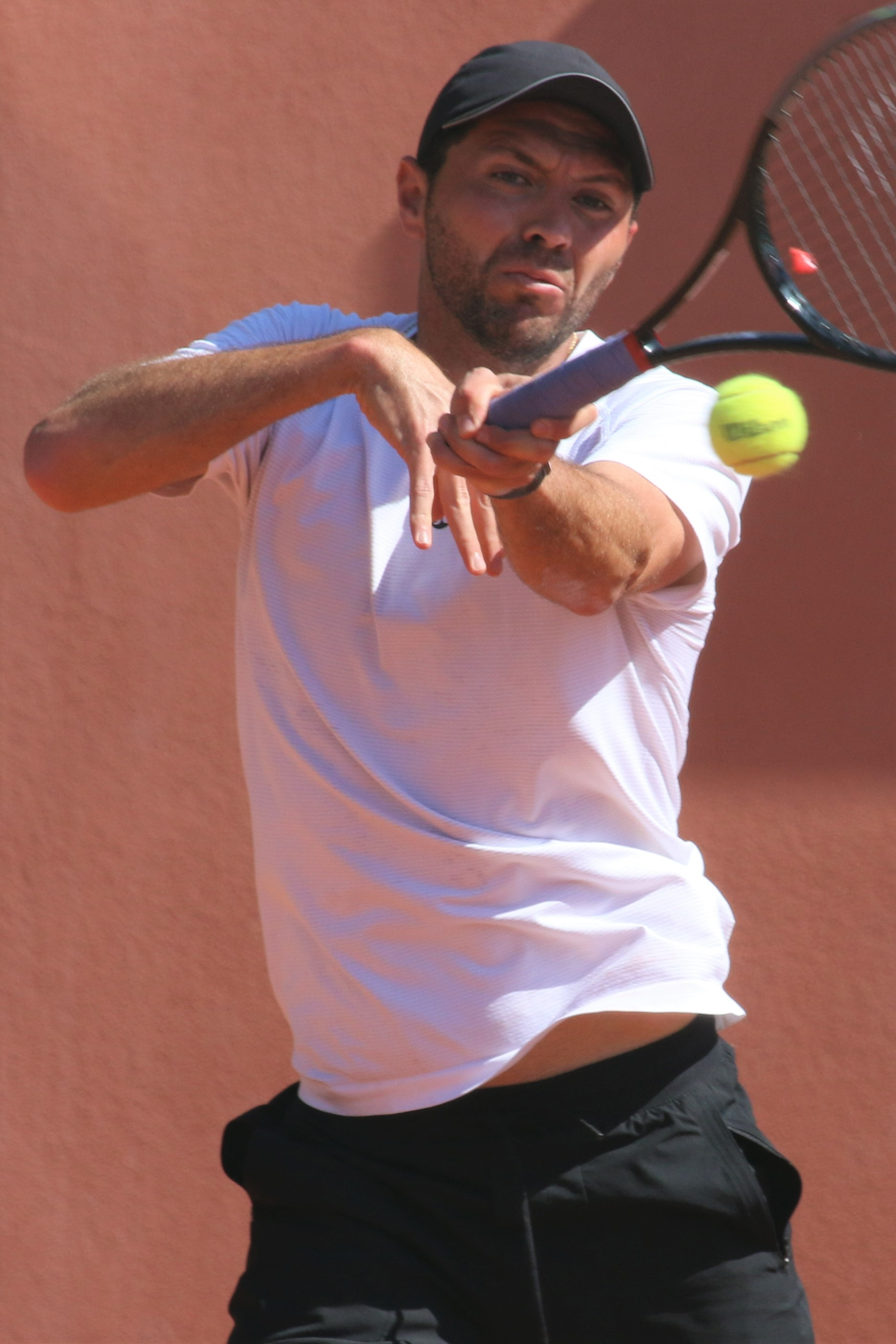
- Hach Verdugo at the 2022 BNP Paribas Primrose Bordeaux
- Country (sports): Mexico
- Residence: Dallas, Texas, US
- Born: 11 November 1989 (age 36) Culiacán, Mexico
- Height: 1.83 m (6 ft 0 in)
- Plays: Left-handed (two-handed backhand)
- College: Abilene Christian University
- Coach: Walter García
- Prize money: US $347,626

Singles
- Career record: 3–1 (at ATP Tour level, Grand Slam level, and in Davis Cup)
- Career titles: 0
- Highest ranking: No. 528 (20 July 2015)

Doubles
- Career record: 22–40 (at ATP Tour level, Grand Slam level, and in Davis Cup)
- Career titles: 1
- Highest ranking: No. 60 (11 July 2022)
- Current ranking: No. 231 (8 December 2025)

Grand Slam doubles results
- Australian Open: 1R (2023)
- French Open: 1R (2022)
- Wimbledon: 2R (2022)
- US Open: 1R (2018, 2022)

Team competitions
- Davis Cup: 3–1
- Last updated on: 12 December 2025.

Hans Hach Verdugo (born 11 November 1989) is a Mexican tennis player.

Hach Verdugo has a career high ATP doubles ranking of No. 60 achieved on 11 July 2022 and a singles ranking of No. 528 achieved on 20 July 2015. He has won one ATP doubles title at 2021 Los Cabos Open.

Hach Verdugo has represented Mexico at the Davis Cup where he has a W/L record of 3–1.

== College career ==
Hach Verdugo played college tennis at Abilene Christian University.

== Professional career ==
In July 2021 he won his maiden ATP doubles title at the 2021 Los Cabos Open partnering John Isner as wildcards.

== ATP Tour finals ==
=== Doubles: 1 (1 title) ===
Legend Grand Slam (0–0) ATP Masters 1000 (0–0) ATP 500 (0–0) ATP 250 (1–0)	Finals by surface Hard (1–0) Clay (0–0) Grass (0–0)	Finals by setting Outdoor (1–0) Indoor (0–0)

Result	W–L	Date	Tournament	Tier	Surface	Partner	Opponents	Score
Win	1–0	Jul 2021	Los Cabos Open, Mexico	ATP 250	Hard	(United States) John Isner	(United States) Hunter Reese (Netherlands) Sem Verbeek	5–7, 6–2, [10–4]

== ATP Challenger Tour finals ==
=== Doubles: 28 (11 titles, 16 runner-ups) ===
Legend ATP Challenger Tour (11–17)	Finals by surface Hard (10–13) Clay (1–3) Grass (0–1) Carpet (0–0)

Result	W–L	Date	Tournament	Tier	Surface	Partner	Opponents	Score
Loss	0–1	Feb 2015	Dallas, USA	Challenger	Hard (i)	(Mexico) Luis Patiño	(Ukraine) Denys Molchanov (Russia) Andrey Rublev	4–6, 6–7^{(5–7)}
Loss	0–2	Apr 2017	San Luis Potosí, Mexico	Challenger	Clay	(Spain) Adrián Menéndez Maceiras	(Ecuador) Roberto Quiroz (Brazil) Caio Zampieri	4–6, 2–6
Loss	0–3	Jul 2017	Gatineau, Canada	Challenger	Hard	(France) Vincent Millot	(United States) Bradley Klahn (United States) Jackson Withrow	2–6, 3–6
Loss	0–4	Oct 2017	Las Vegas, USA	Challenger	Hard	(United States) Dennis Novikov	(United Kingdom) Brydan Klein (United Kingdom) Joe Salisbury	3–6, 6–4, [3–10]
Win	1–4	Sep 2018	Tiburon, USA	Challenger	Hard	(Australia) Luke Saville	(Spain) Gerard Granollers Pujol (Spain) Pedro Martínez	6–3, 6–2
Loss	1–5	Nov 2018	Champaign, USA	Challenger	Hard (i)	(Venezuela) Luis David Martínez	(Australia) Matt Reid (Australia) John-Patrick Smith	4–6, 6–4, [8–10]
Loss	1–6	Mar 2019	Zhangjiagang, China, P.R.	Challenger	Hard	(India) Sriram Balaji	(Australia) Max Purcell (Australia) Luke Saville	2–6, 6–7^{(5–7)}
Loss	1–7	Jun 2019	Columbus, USA	Challenger	Hard (i)	(United States) Donald Young	(United States) Jackson Withrow (Venezuela) Roberto Maytín	7–6^{(7–4)}, 6–7^{(2–7)}, [5–10]
Loss	1–8	Jul 2019	Gatineau, Canada	Challenger	Hard	(United States) Dennis Novikov	(United States) Alex Lawson (Australia) Marc Polmans	4–6, 6–3, [7–10]
Win	2–8	Nov 2019	Knoxville, United States	Challenger	Hard (i)	(Spain) Adrián Menéndez Maceiras	(United States) Bradley Klahn (Netherlands) Sem Verbeek	7–6^{(8–6)}, 4–6, [10–5]
Win	3–8	Jan 2020	Ann Arbor, USA	Challenger	Hard	(United States) Robert Galloway	(Colombia) Nicolás Barrientos (Colombia) Alejandro Gómez	4–6, 6–4, [10–8]
Loss	3–9	Sep 2020	Sibiu, Romania	Challenger	Clay	(United States) Robert Galloway	(United States) Hunter Reese (Poland) Jan Zieliński	4–6, 2–6
Win	4–9	Aug 2021	Warsaw, Poland	Challenger	Clay	(Mexico) Miguel Ángel Reyes-Varela	(Poland) Piotr Matuszewski (Ukraine) Vladyslav Manafov	6–4, 6–4
Loss	4–10	Sep 2021	Cassis, France	Challenger	Hard	(Mexico) Miguel Ángel Reyes-Varela	(India) Sriram Balaji (India) Ramkumar Ramanathan	4–6, 6–3, [6–10]
Loss	4–11	Oct 2021	Santiago, Chile	Challenger	Clay	(Mexico) Miguel Ángel Reyes-Varela	(United States) Evan King (United States) Max Schnur	6–3, 6–7^{(3–7)}, [14–16]
Loss	4–12	Nov 2021	Knoxville, USA	Challenger	Hard (i)	(Mexico) Miguel Ángel Reyes-Varela	(Tunisia) Malek Jaziri (Slovenia) Blaž Rola	6–3, 3–6, [5–10]
Loss	4–13	Nov 2021	Puerto Vallarta, Mexico	Challenger	Hard	(Mexico) Miguel Ángel Reyes-Varela	(Netherlands) Gijs Brouwer (United States) Reese Stalder	4–6, 4–6
Win	5–13	Mar 2022	Monterrey, Mexico	Challenger	Hard	(United States) Austin Krajicek	(United States) Robert Galloway (Australia) John-Patrick Smith	6–0, 6–3
Win	6–13	Jul 2022	Indianapolis, USA	Challenger	Hard (i)	(United States) Hunter Reese	(India) Purav Raja (India) Divij Sharan	7–6^{(7–3)}, 3–6, [10–7]
Win	7–13	Nov 2022	Champaign, USA	Challenger	Hard (i)	(United States) Robert Galloway	(United States) Ezekiel Clark (United States) Alfredo Perez	3–6, 6–3, [10–5]
Loss	7–14	Jan 2023	Nonthaburi, Thailand	Challenger	Hard	(United States) Robert Galloway	(Czech Republic) Marek Gengel (Czech Republic) Adam Pavlásek	6–7^{(4–7)}, 4–6
Win	8–14	Feb 2023	Cleveland, USA	Challenger	Hard (i)	(United States) Robert Galloway	(United States) Reese Stalder (Philippines) Ruben Gonzales	3–6, 7–5, [10–6]
Loss	8–15	Sep 2023	Columbus, USA	Challenger	Hard (i)	(Argentina) Guido Andreozzi	(United States) Robert Cash (Japan) James Trotter	4–6, 6–2, [7–10]
Loss	8–16	May 2024	Little Rock, USA	Challenger	Hard	(India) Rithvik Choudary Bollipalli	(Canada) Liam Draxl (Canada) Benjamin Sigouin	4–6, 6–3, [7–10]
Win	9–16	Jun 2024	Tyler, USA	Challenger	Hard	(Japan) James Trotter	(Ecuador) Andrés Andrade (Jordan) Abdullah Shelbayh	7–6^{(7–3)}, 6–4
Win	10–16	Sep 2024	Columbus, USA	Challenger	Hard (i)	(Japan) James Trotter	(United States) Christian Harrison (United States) Ethan Quinn	6–4, 6–7^{(6–8)}, [11–9]
Loss	10–17	Jul 2025	Newport, USA	Challenger	Grass	(Colombia) Cristian Rodríguez	(United States) Robert Cash (United States) JJ Tracy	6–7^{(3–7)}, 3–6
Win	11–17	Sep 2026	Tiburon, USA	Challenger	Hard	(United States) JJ Tracy	(United States) Nathaniel Lammons (United States) Jackson Withrow	7–6^{(9–7)}, 6–4

== ITF Futures finals ==
=== Singles: 1 (1 title) ===
Legend ITF Futures (1–0)

Result	W–L	Date	Tournament	Tier	Surface	Opponent	Score
Win	1–0	Mar 2015	Nicaragua F1, Managua	Futures	Hard	(Colombia) Juan Sebastián Gómez	6–4, 6–3

=== Doubles: 27 (19 titles, 8 runner-ups) ===
Legend ITF Futures (19–8)	Finals by surface Hard (15–6) Clay (4–2) Grass (0–0) Carpet (0–0)

Result	W–L	Date	Tournament	Tier	Surface	Partner	Opponents	Score
Loss	0–1	Sep 2013	Canada F9, Markham	Futures	Hard (i)	(Canada) Andrew Ochotta	(United States) Sekou Bangoura (United States) Evan King	3–6, 2–6
Win	1–1	Feb 2014	USA F5, Sunrise	Futures	Clay	(Mexico) Daniel Garza	(Austria) Marc Rath (Austria) Nicolas Reissig	7–6^{(7–4)}, 6–4
Loss	1–2	Jun 2014	Canada F3, Richmond	Futures	Hard	(Canada) Brayden Schnur	(United States) Matt Seeberger (South Africa) Rik de Voest	7–5, 5–7, [5–10]
Win	2–2	Jul 2014	Canada F5, Saskatoon	Futures	Hard	(Canada) Brayden Schnur	(United States) Mousheg Hovhannisyan (United States) Alexander Sarkissian	6–2, 6–3
Win	3–2	Aug 2014	Mexico F10, Puebla	Futures	Hard	(United States) Chris Letcher	(Mexico) Adrián Fernández (Mexico) Lázaro Navarro-Batles	6–3, 6–4
Win	4–2	Oct 2014	USA F29, Brownsville	Futures	Hard	(Venezuela) Luis David Martínez	(Russia) Mikhail Fufygin (Russia) Vitali Reshetnikov	7–6^{(7–3)}, 7–6^{(7–3)}
Win	5–2	Feb 2015	Guatemala F1, Guatemala City	Futures	Hard	(Mexico) Manuel Sánchez	(Mexico) Kevin Jack Carpenter (United States) Collin Johns	6–3, 6–2
Loss	5–3	Feb 2015	El Salvador F1, Santa Tecla	Futures	Clay	(South Africa) Keith-Patrick Crowley	(Venezuela) Luis David Martínez (El Salvador) Marcelo Arévalo	4–6, 4–6
Loss	5–4	Mar 2015	Nicaragua F1, Managua	Futures	Hard	(South Africa) Keith-Patrick Crowley	(Colombia) Juan Sebastián Gómez (Chile) Julio Peralta	3–6, 3–6
Win	6–4	Apr 2015	USA F13, Little Rock	Futures	Hard	(South Africa) Keith-Patrick Crowley	(United States) Matt Seeberger (United States) Eric Quigley	6–3, 1–6, [10–7]
Win	7–4	May 2015	Mexico F1, Morelia	Futures	Hard	(Venezuela) Luis David Martínez	(United States) Oscar Fabian Matthews (United States) Hunter Nicholas	6–2, 7–6^{(7–0)}
Win	8–4	May 2015	Mexico F4, Córdoba	Futures	Hard	(South Africa) Keith-Patrick Crowley	(Venezuela) Luis David Martínez (Ecuador) Iván Endara	6–4, 6–3
Win	9–4	Oct 2015	USA F29, Mansfield	Futures	Hard	(United States) Eric Quigley	(United Kingdom) Liam Broady (Australia) Ashley Fisher	7–5, 6–3
Win	10–4	Oct 2015	USA F30, Houston	Futures	Hard	(United States) Deiton Baughman	(Sweden) Adam Gustavsson (United States) David Warren	6–2, 6–0
Loss	10–5	May 2016	Mexico F3, Mexico City	Futures	Hard	(Mexico) Luis Patiño	(Ecuador) Iván Endara (Ecuador) Roberto Quiroz	walkover
Win	11–5	May 2016	Mexico F4, Morelia	Futures	Hard	(Mexico) Luis Patiño	(Bolivia) Alejandro Mendoza (Bolivia) Federico Zeballos	6–3, 6–2
Win	12–5	Jun 2016	USA F19, Buffalo	Futures	Clay	(Japan) Kaichi Uchida	(United Kingdom) Farris Fathi Gosea (United States) Tim Kopinski	6–2, 6–3
Win	13–5	Jun 2016	USA F20, Rochester	Futures	Clay	(Australia) Gavin van Peperzeel	(South Africa) Damon Gooch (Japan) Kaichi Uchida	7–6^{(7–5)}, 6–2
Loss	13–6	Sep 2016	Canada F6, Calgary	Futures	Hard	(New Zealand) José Statham	(Greece) Stefanos Tsitsipas (Netherlands) Tim van Rijthoven	4–6, 6–2, [11–13]
Win	14–6	Sep 2016	Canada F7, Toronto	Futures	Clay	(United States) Rhyne Williams	(United States) Hunter Reese (United States) Jackson Withrow	7–5, 6–4
Win	15–6	Sep 2016	Canada F8, Toronto	Futures	Hard	(United States) Rhyne Williams	(Bolivia) Juan Carlos Manuel Aguilar (Canada) Benjamin Sigouin	6–3, 6–3
Win	16–6	Oct 2016	USA F31, Houston	Futures	Hard	(United States) Rhyne Williams	(United States) Hunter Reese (United States) Jackson Withrow	6–3, 6–3
Win	17–6	Dec 2016	USA F39, Waco	Futures	Hard (i)	(United Kingdom) Farris Fathi Gosea	(Colombia) Juan Manuel Benítez Chavarriaga (Germany) Julian Lenz	7–5, 6–3
Loss	17–7	Jun 2017	Spain F16, Huelva	Futures	Clay	(United States) Alex Lawson	(Brazil) Pedro Bernardi (Brazil) Guilherme Clezar	6–4, 4–6, [9–11]
Win	18–7	Nov 2017	USA F38, Columbus	Futures	Hard (i)	(Venezuela) Luis David Martínez	(United Kingdom) Luke Bambridge (United Kingdom) Edward Corrie	3–6, 7–6^{(7–2)}, [10–7]
Loss	18–8	Jan 2018	USA F1, Los Angeles	Futures	Hard	(United Kingdom) Luke Bambridge	(Brazil) Karue Sell (United States) Martin Redlicki	4–6, 3–6
Win	19–8	Jan 2018	USA F2, Long Beach	Futures	Hard	(United Kingdom) Luke Bambridge	(United States) Alexander Lebedev (United States) Collin Altamirano	6–3, 6–2
