= Robert Cash =

American tennis player (born 2001)

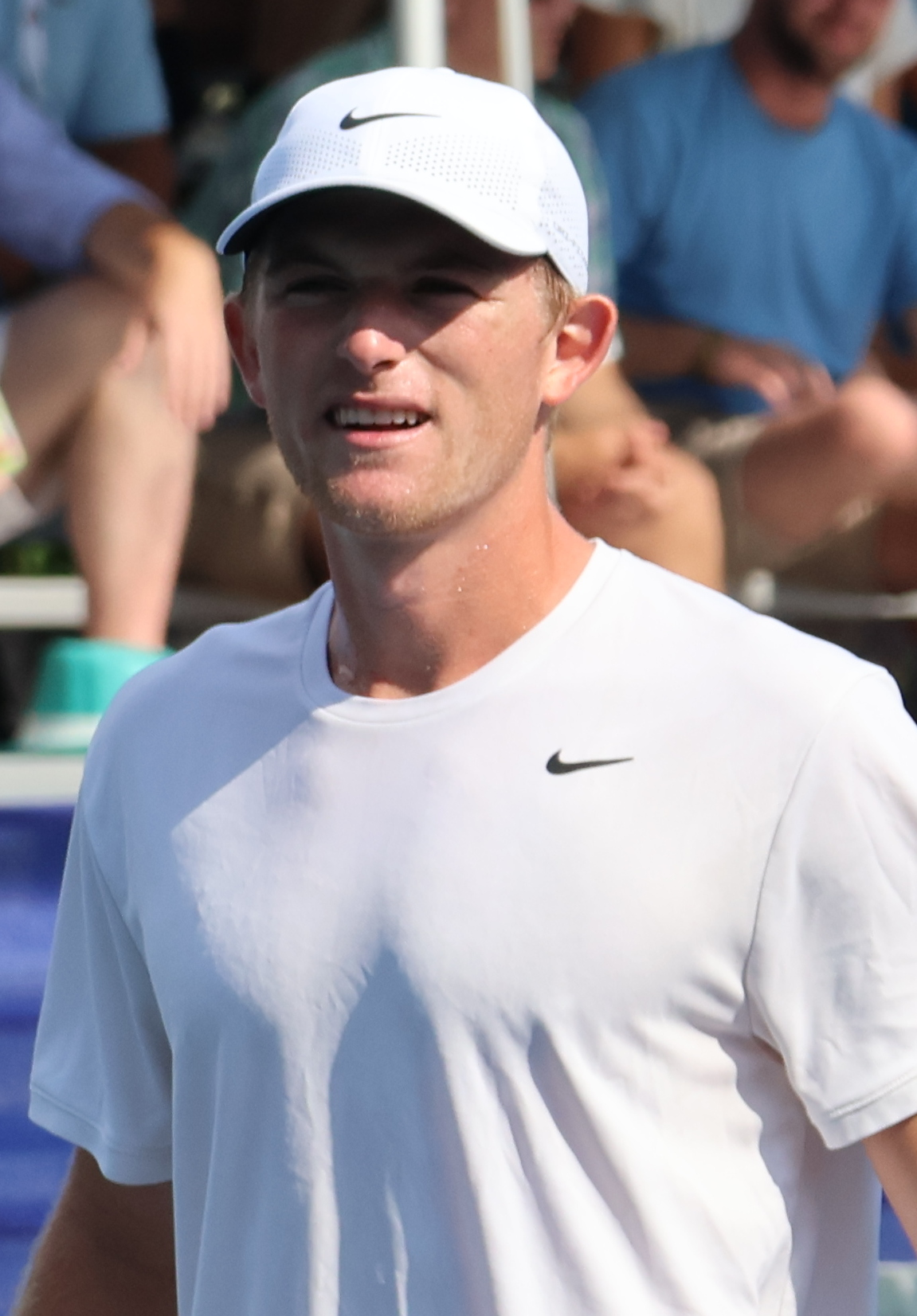
- Cash at the 2024 Washington Open
- Country (sports): United States
- Born: 7 March 2001 (age 25) Westerville, Ohio
- Height: 6 ft 3 in (1.91 m)
- Plays: Right-handed (two-handed backhand)
- College: Ohio State
- Coach: Chris Cheng
- Prize money: US $523,724

Singles
- Career record: 0–0
- Career titles: 0
- Highest ranking: No. 1,026 (November 27, 2023)

Doubles
- Career record: 31–32
- Career titles: 2
- Highest ranking: No. 32 (June 22, 2026)
- Current ranking: No. 32 (June 22, 2026)

Grand Slam doubles results
- Australian Open: 3R (2026)
- French Open: 2R (2026)
- Wimbledon: 2R (2025, 2026)
- US Open: SF (2025)
- Last updated on: June 22, 2026.

Robert Cash (born 7 March 2001 in Westerville, Ohio) is an American tennis player who specializes in doubles. He has a career high ATP doubles ranking of world No. 32 achieved on June 22, 2026 and a singles ranking of No. 1,026 achieved on November 27, 2023.

== College career ==
Cash plays college tennis at Ohio State. He won the 2024 NCAA doubles title with partner James "JJ" Tracy.

== Professional career ==
Cash won his first ATP Challenger doubles title at the 2023 Columbus Challenger with James Trotter. With partner JJ Tracy, on his ATP debut, he recorded his first ATP wins at the 2024 Hall of Fame Open where the pair reached their first ATP final as wildcards.

After winning the 2024 NCAA Doubles Championship, Cash and Tracy were given a wildcard into the 2024 US Open. They defeated Nicolás Jarry and Cristian Rodríguez in the first round, before losing to 16th-seeded Máximo González and Andrés Molteni in three sets.

He reached the top 100 in the doubles rankings on 10 February 2025, following his Challenger title at the 2025 Cleveland Open partnering Tracy. Alongside Tracy, he won his first ATP Tour level title at the 2025 Los Cabos Open, defeating Blake Bayldon and Tristan Schoolkate in the final.

At the 2025 US Open Cash and Tracy reached a Grand Slam semifinal for the first time in their careers, where they fell to Roland Garros and eventual US Open champions Marcel Granollers and Horacio Zeballos in three sets. As a result they reached new career-highs in the top 40 on 8 September 2025.

== ATP Tour finals ==
=== Doubles: 3 (2 titles, 1 runner-up) ===
Legend Grand Slam Tournaments (0–0) ATP Tour Finals (0–0) ATP Tour Masters 1000 (0–0) ATP Tour 500 Series (0–0) ATP Tour 250 Series (2–1)	Finals by surface Hard (1–0) Clay (1–0) Grass (0–1)	Finals by setting Outdoor (2–1) Indoor (0–0)

Result	W–L	Date	Tournament	Tier	Surface	Partner	Opponents	Score
Loss	0–1	Jul 2024	Hall of Fame Open, United States	250 Series	Grass	(United States) JJ Tracy	(Sweden) André Göransson (Netherlands) Sem Verbeek	3–6, 4–6
Win	1–1	Jul 2025	Los Cabos Open, Mexico	250 Series	Hard	(United States) JJ Tracy	(Australia) Blake Bayldon (Australia) Tristan Schoolkate	7–6^{(7–4)}, 6–4
Win	2–1	Mar 2026	Grand Prix Hassan II, Morocco	250 Series	Clay	(United States) JJ Tracy	(United States) Vasil Kirkov (Netherlands) Bart Stevens	6–2, 6–3

== ATP Challenger and ITF World Tennis Tour finals ==
=== Doubles: (10 titles, 3 runners-up) ===
Legend ATP Challenger Tour (9–2) ITF World Tennis Tour (1–1)	Finals by surface Hard (6–3) Clay (3–0) Grass (1–0)

Result	W–L	Date	Tournament	Tier	Surface	Partner	Opponents	Score
Loss	0–1	Nov 2021	M25 Columbus, United States	World Tennis Tour	Hard	(United States) JJ Tracy	(Switzerland) Adrien Burdet (Switzerland) Leandro Riedi	6–7^{(5–7)}, 6–7^{(2–7)}
Win	1–1	Sep 2023	Columbus Challenger, US	Challenger	Hard (i)	(Canada) James Trotter	(Argentina) Guido Andreozzi (Mexico) Hans Hach Verdugo	6–4, 2–6, [10–7]
Win	2–1	Nov 2023	M25 Columbus, US	World Tennis Tour	Hard	(United States) Bryce Nakashima	(Japan) Shunsuke Mitsui (United Kingdom) Johannus Monday	7–5, 7–6^{(12–10)}
Win	3–1	Aug 2024	Lincoln Challenger, US	Challenger	Hard	(United States) JJ Tracy	(Uruguay) Ariel Behar (United Kingdom) Luke Johnson	7–6^{(8–6)}, 6–3
Loss	3–2	Oct 2024	Calgary Challenger, Canada	Challenger	Hard	(United States) JJ Tracy	(United States) Ryan Seggerman (United States) Patrik Trhac	3–6, 6–7^{(3–7)}
Win	4–2	Nov 2024	Charlottesville Challenger, US	Challenger	Hard	(United States) JJ Tracy	(Luxembourg) Chris Rodesch (United States) William Woodall	4–6, 7–6^{(9–7)}, [10–7]
Win	5–2	Nov 2024	Challenger de Drummondville, Canada	Challenger	Hard	(United States) JJ Tracy	(Canada) Liam Draxl (Canada) Cleeve Harper	6–2, 6–4
Win	6–2	Jan 2025	Cleveland Open, US	Challenger	Hard	(United States) JJ Tracy	(Canada) Juan Carlos Aguilar (Poland) Filip Pieczonka	7–6^{(7–4)}, 6–1
Win	7–2	Apr 2025	Sarasota Open, US	Challenger	Clay (green)	(United States) JJ Tracy	(Argentina) Federico Agustin Gomez (Venezuela) Luis David Martínez	6–4, 7–6^{(7–3)}
Win	8–2	Apr 2025	Open Aix Provence, France	Challenger	Clay	(United States) JJ Tracy	(France) Théo Arribagé (Monaco) Hugo Nys	7–5, 7–6^{(7–5)}
Win	9–2	Jul 2025	Hall of Fame Open, US	Challenger	Grass	(United States) JJ Tracy	(Mexico) Hans Hach Verdugo (Colombia) Cristian Rodríguez	7–6^{(7–3)}, 6–3
Win	10–2	May 2026	Open Aix Provence, France (2)	Challenger	Clay	(United States) JJ Tracy	(United States) Vasil Kirkov (Netherlands) Bart Stevens	5–7, 6–4, [10–4]
Loss	10–3	Aug 2026	Indiana Hardcourt Championships, US	Challenger	Hard	(Netherlands) Bart Stevens	(Ecuador) Gonzalo Escobar (India) Niki Kaliyanda Poonacha	4–6, 1–6
