= Columbus Challenger =

Tennis tournament in Ohio, U.S.

- 2026 Columbus Challenger

Tournament information
- Event name: Columbus Challenger
- Location: Columbus, Ohio, U.S.
- Venue: Ohio State Varsity Tennis Center
- Surface: Hard (indoor)
- Website: columbuschallenger.com

Current champions (2026)
- Men's singles: (Switzerland) Dylan Dietrich
- Men's doubles: (United States) Brandon Carpico (United States) Nikita Samuel Filin
ATP Tour
- Category: Challenger 75
- Draw: 32S / 16Q / 16D
- Prize money: $100,000 (2025), $53,120 (2022)
WTA Tour
- Category: WTA 125
- Draw: 32S / 16Q / 11D
- Prize money: US$115,000 (2021)

The Columbus Challenger is a professional tennis tournament played on hard courts. It is currently part of the ATP Challenger Tour and WTA 125K series. The ATP event is held annually in Columbus, Ohio, U.S., as it has been since 2015, the tournament's start. A one-time women's event was held in 2021.

== Past finals ==
=== Men's singles ===
Year	Champion	Runner-up	Score
2015	(United States) Dennis Novikov	(United States) Ryan Harrison	6–3, 3–6, 6–3
2016 (1)	(Denmark) Mikael Torpegaard	(Germany) Benjamin Becker	6–4, 1–6, 6–2
2016 (2)	(United States) Stefan Kozlov	(United States) Tennys Sandgren	6–1, 2–6, 6–2
2017	(Croatia) Ante Pavić	(United Kingdom) Alexander Ward	6–7^{(11–13)}, 6–4, 6–3
2018	(United States) Michael Mmoh	(Australia) Jordan Thompson	6–3, 7–6^{(7–4)}
2019 (1)	(United States) J. J. Wolf	(Denmark) Mikael Torpegaard	6–7^{(4–7)}, 6–3, 6–4
2019 (2)	(Denmark) Mikael Torpegaard (2)	(South Korea) Nam Ji-sung	6–1, 7–5
2019 (3)	(Canada) Peter Polansky	(United States) J. J. Wolf	6–3, 7–6^{(7–4)}
2020	(United States) J. J. Wolf (2)	(Uzbekistan) Denis Istomin	6–4, 6–2
2021	(United States) Stefan Kozlov (2)	(Australia) Max Purcell	4–6, 6–2, 6–4
2022 (1)	(Japan) Yoshihito Nishioka	(Switzerland) Dominic Stricker	6–2, 6–4
2022 (2)	(Australia) Jordan Thompson	(Ecuador) Emilio Gómez	7–6^{(8–6)}, 6–2
2023	(United States) Denis Kudla	(Canada) Alexis Galarneau	6–2, 6–1
2024	(Japan) Naoki Nakagawa	(Japan) James Trotter	7–6^{(10–8)}, 5–7, 7–6^{(7–5)}
2025	(United States) Michael Zheng	(United States) Martin Damm	3–6, 6–3, 7–5
2026	(Switzerland) Dylan Dietrich	(Jordan) Abdullah Shelbayh	6–3, 6–2

=== Women's singles ===
Year	Champion	Runner-up	Score
2021	(Spain) Nuria Párrizas Díaz	(China) Wang Xinyu	7–6^{(7–2)}, 6–3

=== Men's doubles ===
Year	Champions	Runners-up	Score
2015	(United States) Chase Buchanan (Slovenia) Blaž Rola	(United States) Mitchell Krueger (United States) Eric Quigley	6–4, 4–6, [19–17]
2016 (1)	(Latvia) Miķelis Lībietis (United States) Dennis Novikov	(Canada) Philip Bester (Canada) Peter Polansky	7–5, 7–6^{(7–4)}
2016 (2)	(Republic of Ireland) David O'Hare (United Kingdom) Joe Salisbury	(United Kingdom) Luke Bambridge (United Kingdom) Cameron Norrie	6–3, 6–4
2017	(Germany) Dominik Köpfer (United States) Denis Kudla	(United Kingdom) Luke Bambridge (Republic of Ireland) David O'Hare	7–6^{(8–6)}, 7–6^{(7–3)}
2018	(United States) Tommy Paul (Canada) Peter Polansky	(Ecuador) Gonzalo Escobar (Ecuador) Roberto Quiroz	6–3, 6–3
2019 (1)	(United States) Maxime Cressy (Portugal) Bernardo Saraiva	(United States) Robert Galloway (United States) Nathaniel Lammons	7–5, 7–6^{(7–3)}
2019 (2)	(Venezuela) Roberto Maytín (United States) Jackson Withrow	(Mexico) Hans Hach Verdugo (United States) Donald Young	6–7^{(4–7)}, 7–6^{(7–2)}, [10–5]
2019 (3)	(United States) Martin Redlicki (United States) Jackson Withrow (2)	(United States) Nathan Pasha (United States) Max Schnur	6–4, 7–6^{(7–4)}
2020	(Philippines) Treat Huey (United States) Nathaniel Lammons	(United Kingdom) Lloyd Glasspool (United States) Alex Lawson	7–6^{(7–3)}, 7–6^{(7–4)}
2021	(United States) Stefan Kozlov (Canada) Peter Polansky	(United States) Andrew Lutschaunig (Japan) James Trotter	7–5, 7–6^{(7–5)}
2022 (1)	(United States) Tennys Sandgren (Denmark) Mikael Torpegaard	(Switzerland) Luca Margaroli (Japan) Yasutaka Uchiyama	5–7, 6–4, [10–5]
2022 (2)	(United Kingdom) Julian Cash (United Kingdom) Henry Patten	(United Kingdom) Charles Broom (Germany) Constantin Frantzen	6–2, 7–5
2023	(United States) Robert Cash (Japan) James Trotter	(Argentina) Guido Andreozzi (Mexico) Hans Hach Verdugo	6–4, 2–6, [10–7]
2024	(Mexico) Hans Hach Verdugo (Japan) James Trotter	(United States) Christian Harrison (United States) Ethan Quinn	6–4, 6–7^{(6–8)}, [11–9]
2025	(Australia) Patrick Harper (United Kingdom) Johannus Monday	(United States) George Goldhoff (United States) Theodore Winegar	6–4, 6–3
2026	(United States) Brandon Carpico (United States) Nikita Samuel Filin	(United States) Daniel Milavsky (United States) Braden Shick	7–6^{(7–3)}, 2–6, [10–4]

=== Women's doubles ===
Year	Champions	Runners-up	Score
2021	(China) Wang Xinyu (China) Zheng Saisai	(Slovenia) Dalila Jakupović (Spain) Nuria Párrizas Díaz	6–1, 6–1

== See also ==
- Columbus Open
