= Cannon Kingsley =

American tennis player (born 2001)

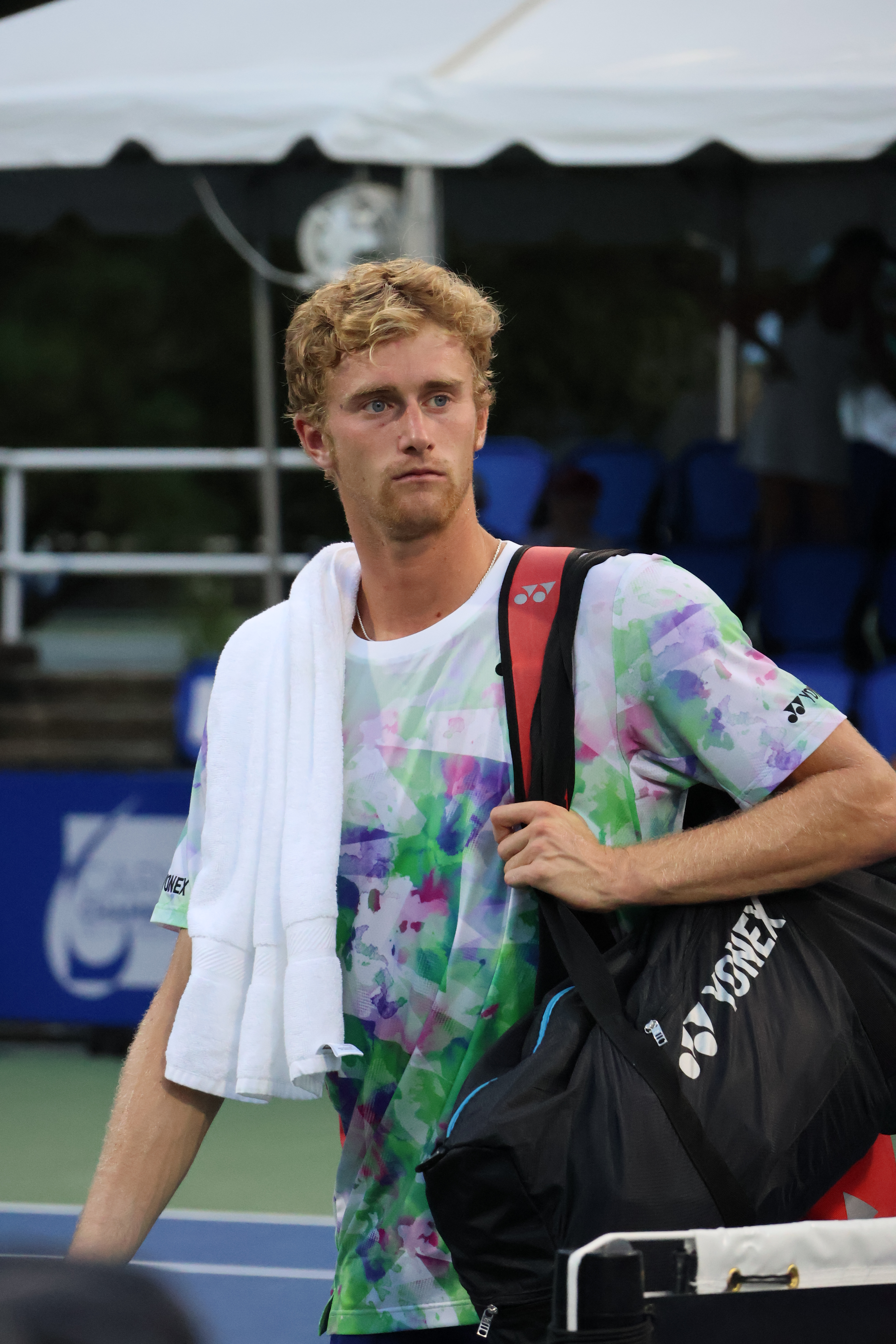
- Kingsley at the 2023 Cary Challenger II
- Country (sports): United States
- Born: May 6, 2001 (age 25) Mineola, New York, United States
- Height: 6 ft 3 in (1.91 m)
- Plays: Right-handed (two-handed backhand)
- College: Ohio State
- Prize money: US $138,086

Singles
- Career record: 0–0
- Career titles: 0
- Highest ranking: No. 404 (February 12, 2024)
- Current ranking: No. 470 (August 31, 2026)

Doubles
- Career record: 0–0
- Career titles: 3 Challenger, 1 ITF
- Highest ranking: No. 293 (July 22, 2024)
- Current ranking: No. 432 (August 31, 2026)
- Last updated on: September 1, 2026.

Cannon Kingsley (born May 6, 2001) is an American tennis player. He has a career-high ATP singles ranking of No. 404 achieved on February 12, 2024 and a career-high ATP doubles ranking of No. 293 achieved on July 22, 2024.

He played college tennis at Ohio State.

== Career ==
Kingsley won ATP Challenger doubles titles in Knoxville in 2023 with Luis David Martínez and Winnipeg in 2024 with Christian Harrison.
