= James Trotter (tennis) =

Japanese tennis player (born 1999)

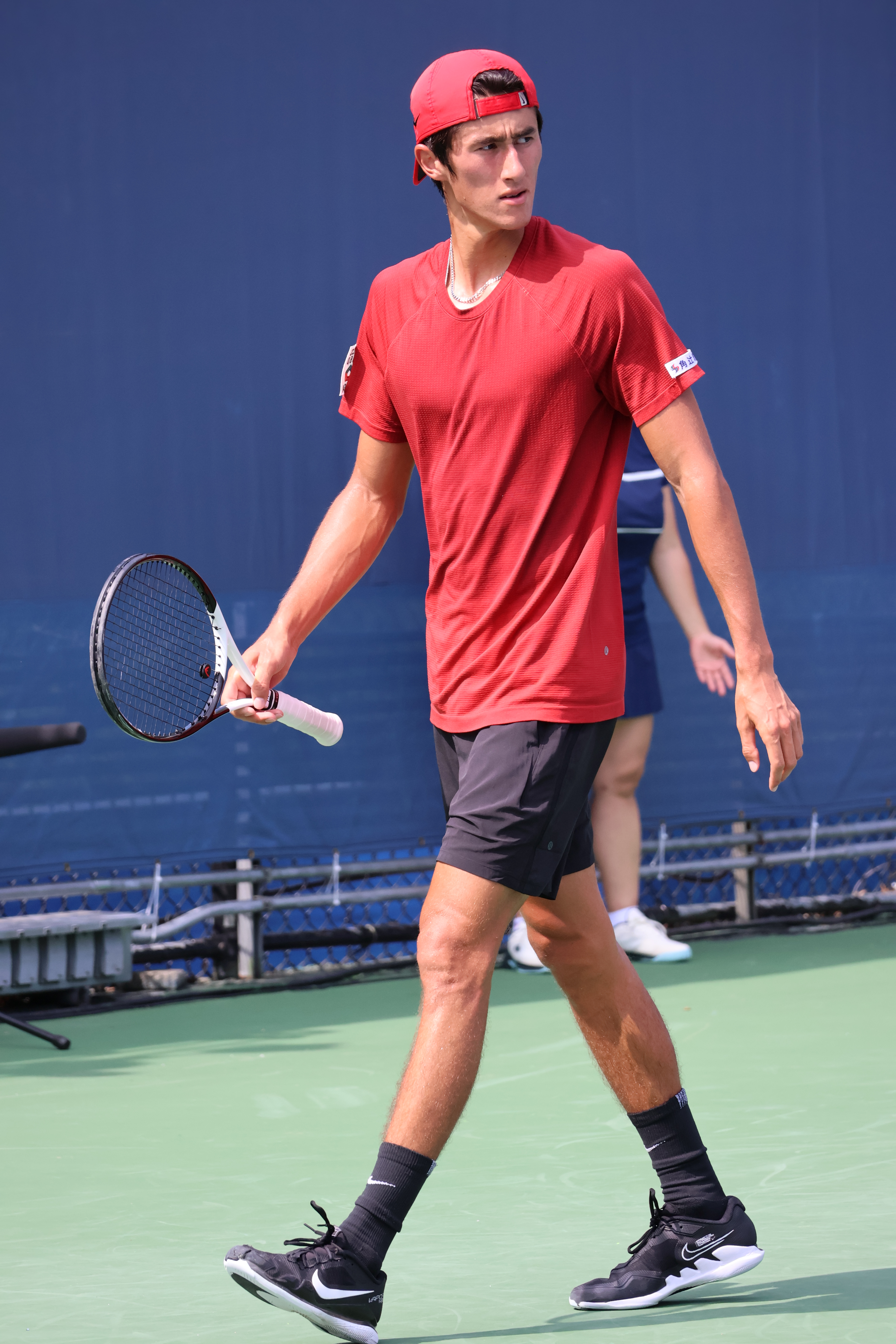
- Trotter in 2023
- Full name: James Kent Trotter
- Born: 29 July 1999 (age 26) Nishinomiya, Japan
- Height: 1.83 m (6 ft 0 in)
- Plays: Right-handed (one-handed backhand)
- College: Ohio State University
- Prize money: US $ 243,465

Singles
- Career record: 0–2 (at ATP Tour level, Grand Slam level, and in Davis Cup)
- Career titles: 2 Challenger
- Highest ranking: No. 170 (21 April 2025)
- Current ranking: No. 379 (8 June 2026)

Grand Slam singles results
- Australian Open: Q2 (2025)
- French Open: Q3 (2025)
- Wimbledon: Q2 (2025)
- US Open: Q1 (2025)

Doubles
- Career record: 0–1 (at ATP Tour level, Grand Slam level, and in Davis Cup)
- Career titles: 7 Challenger
- Highest ranking: No. 142 (9 September 2024)
- Current ranking: No. 480 (8 June 2026)
- Last updated on: 8 June 2026.

James Kent Trotter (born 29 July 1999) is a Japanese tennis player. He has a career high ATP singles ranking of world No. 170 achieved on 21 April 2025 and a doubles ranking of No. 142 achieved on 9 September 2024.

Trotter has won two singles and seven ATP Challenger doubles titles.

== Professional career ==
He won the Challenger doubles titles at the 2023 Columbus Challenger with Robert Cash, at the 2024 Cleveland Open and in Cherbourg with George Goldhoff, at the 2024 Tyler Tennis Championships and again in Columbus with Hans Hach Verdugo. At the same tournament in Tyler, Texas, he also won his first ATP Challenger singles title defeating Brandon Holt in the final.

== College career ==
Trotter played college tennis at Ohio State, where he won the NCAA Division I tennis men's doubles championship in 2023.

== Performance timeline ==
Key
W	F	SF	QF	#R	RR	Q#	DNQ	A	NH

(W) winner; (F) finalist; (SF) semifinalist; (QF) quarterfinalist; (#R) rounds 4, 3, 2, 1; (RR) round-robin stage; (Q#) qualification round; (DNQ) did not qualify; (A) absent; (NH) not held; (SR) strike rate (events won / competed); (W–L) win–loss record.
To avoid confusion and double counting, these charts are updated at the conclusion of a tournament or when the player's participation has ended.

=== Singles ===
Tournament	2025	SR	W–L	Win %
Grand Slam tournaments
Australian Open	Q2	0 / 0	0–0	–
French Open	Q3	0 / 0	0–0	–
Wimbledon	Q2	0 / 0	0–0	–
US Open	Q1	0 / 0	0–0	–
Win–loss	0–0	0 / 0	0–0	–
ATP Masters 1000
Indian Wells Masters	Q1	0 / 0	0–0	–
Miami Open	A	0 / 0	0–0	–
Monte Carlo Masters	A	0 / 0	0–0	–
Madrid Open	A	0 / 0	0-0	–
Italian Open	A	0 / 0	0–0	–
Canadian Open	Q1	0 / 0	0–0	–
Cincinnati Masters	Q1	0 / 0	0–0	–
Shanghai Masters	1R	0 / 1	0–1	0%
Paris Masters	A	0 / 0	0–0	–
Win–loss	0–1	0 / 1	0–1	0%

== ATP Challenger Tour finals ==
=== Singles: 3 (2 titles, 1 runner-up) ===
Legend ATP Challenger Tour (2–1)

Result	W–L	Date	Tournament	Tier	Surface	Opponent	Score
Win	1–0	Jun 2024	Tyler, USA	Challenger	Hard	(United States) Brandon Holt	6–2, 7–6^{(7–3)}
Loss	1–1	Sep 2024	Columbus, USA	Challenger	Hard (i)	(Japan) Naoki Nakagawa	6–7^{(8–10)}, 7–5, 6–7^{(5–7)}
Win	2–1	Oct 2024	Charlottesville, USA	Challenger	Hard (i)	(United States) Nishesh Basavareddy	6–3, 6–4

=== Doubles: 10 (7 titles, 3 runner-ups) ===
Legend ATP Challenger Tour (7–3)

Result	W–L	Date	Tournament	Tier	Surface	Partner	Opponents	Score
Loss	0–1	Sep 2021	Columbus, USA	Challenger	Hard (i)	(United States) Andrew Lutschaunig	(United States) Stefan Kozlov (Canada) Peter Polansky	5–7, 6–7^{(5–7)}
Win	1–1	Sep 2023	Columbus, USA	Challenger	Hard (i)	(United States) Robert Cash	(Argentina) Guido Andreozzi (Mexico) Hans Hach Verdugo	6–4, 2–6, [10–7]
Win	2–1	Jan 2024	Cleveland, USA	Challenger	Hard (i)	(United States) George Goldhoff	(United States) William Blumberg (United States) Alex Lawson	6–7^{(0–7)}, 6–3, [10–8]
Win	3–1	Feb 2024	Cherbourg, France	Challenger	Hard (i)	(United States) George Goldhoff	(Netherlands) Ryan Nijboer (Germany) Niklas Schell	6–2, 6–3
Win	4–1	Apr 2024	Shenzhen, China	Challenger	Hard	(Japan) Yuta Shimizu	(China) Wang Aoran (China) Zhou Yi	7–6^{(7–5)}, 7–6^{(7–4)}
Win	5–1	Jun 2024	Tyler, USA	Challenger	Hard	(Mexico) Hans Hach Verdugo	(Ecuador) Andrés Andrade (Jordan) Abdullah Shelbayh	7–6^{(7–3)}, 6–4
Loss	5–2	Jul 2024	Lexington, USA	Challenger	Hard	(Japan) Yuta Shimizu	(Sweden) André Göransson (Netherlands) Sem Verbeek	4–6, 3–6
Win	6–2	Sep 2024	Columbus, USA (2)	Challenger	Hard (i)	(Mexico) Hans Hach Verdugo	(United States) Christian Harrison (United States) Ethan Quinn	6–4, 6–7^{(6–8)}, [11–9]
Win	7–2	Jan 2026	Phan Thiết, Vietnam	Challenger	Hard	(Japan) Kaito Uesugi	(United States) George Goldhoff (United States) Reese Stalder	6–3, 5–7, [10–4]
Loss	7–3	Mar 2026	Miyazaki, Japan	Challenger	Hard	(Japan) Yuta Shimizu	(South Korea) Nam Ji-sung (Finland) Patrik Niklas-Salminen	5–7, 3–6
