= 2022 Little Rock Challenger – Doubles =

Doubles
- 2022 Little Rock Challenger

Final
- Champions: (Australia) Andrew Harris (United States) Christian Harrison
- Runners-up: (United States) Robert Galloway (United States) Max Schnur
- Score: 6–3, 6–4

Events
Singles	Doubles
← 2021 ·	Little Rock Challenger	· 2023 →

Nicolás Barrientos and Ernesto Escobedo were the defending champions but chose not to defend their title.

Andrew Harris and Christian Harrison won the title after defeating Robert Galloway and Max Schnur 6–3, 6–4 in the final.

== Seeds ==
1. (United States) Robert Galloway / (United States) Max Schnur (final)
2. (United States) JC Aragone / (Spain) Adrián Menéndez Maceiras (first round)
3. (Colombia) Nicolás Mejía / (Ecuador) Roberto Quiroz (quarterfinals)
4. (Australia) Rinky Hijikata / (United States) Reese Stalder (first round)

== Draw ==
=== Key ===
- Q = Qualifier
- WC = Wild card
- LL = Lucky loser
- Alt = Alternate
- SE = Special exempt
- PR = Protected ranking
- ITF = ITF entry
- JE = Junior exempt
- w/o = Walkover
- r = Retired
- d = Defaulted
- SR = Special ranking

First round
1	(United States) R Galloway (United States) M Schnur	7	6
(Turkey) A Çelikbilek (Turkey) E Kırkın	5	4
WC	(United States) G Nanda (United States) K Smith	7	5	[10]
WC	(United States) S Kirchheimer (United States) D Young	5	7	[8]
3	(Colombia) N Mejía (Ecuador) R Quiroz	6	4	[10]
(Germany) S Fanselow (Australia) D Sweeny	4	6	[6]
(South Korea) Y-s Chung (Greece) M Pervolarakis	6	6
(Bolivia) B Arias (South Africa) R Roelofse	1	4
(Japan) H Moriya (China) Zh Zhang	3	6	[10]
(Peru) N Álvarez (Argentina) G Villanueva	6	2	[5]
(Japan) K Uchida (Chinese Taipei) T-l Wu	3	6	[10]
4	(Australia) R Hijikata (United States) R Stalder	6	1	[8]
PR	(Australia) A Harris (United States) C Harrison	6	7
(Tunisia) M Jaziri (Kazakhstan) D Yevseyev	3	5
(Ecuador) E Gómez (United States) A Kovacevic	6	6
2	(United States) JC Aragone (Spain) A Menéndez Maceiras	1	3

Quarterfinals
1	(United States) R Galloway (United States) M Schnur	6	3	[16]
WC	(United States) G Nanda (United States) K Smith	4	6	[14]
3	(Colombia) N Mejía (Ecuador) R Quiroz	6^{3}	4
(South Korea) Y-s Chung (Greece) M Pervolarakis	7^{7}	6
(Japan) H Moriya (China) Zh Zhang	6	1	[5]
(Japan) K Uchida (Chinese Taipei) T-l Wu	4	6	[10]
PR	(Australia) A Harris (United States) C Harrison	6	4	[10]
(Ecuador) E Gómez (United States) A Kovacevic	4	6	[4]

Semifinals
1	(United States) R Galloway (United States) M Schnur	7	7^{7}
(South Korea) Y-s Chung (Greece) M Pervolarakis	5	6^{0}
(Japan) K Uchida (Chinese Taipei) T-l Wu	4	2
PR	(Australia) A Harris (United States) C Harrison	6	6

Final
1	(United States) R Galloway (United States) M Schnur	3	4
PR	(Australia) A Harris (United States) C Harrison	6	6
