= 2026 Little Rock Challenger – Doubles =

Doubles
- 2026 Little Rock Challenger

Final
- Champions: (United States) Pranav Kumar (United States) Karl Poling
- Runners-up: (Australia) Eric Padgham (Czech Republic) Jakub Vrba
- Score: 6–4, 6–1

Events
Singles	Doubles
- Little Rock Challenger

Aziz Dougaz and Antoine Escoffier were the defending champions but chose not to defend their title.

Pranav Kumar and Karl Poling won the title after defeating Eric Padgham and Jakub Vrba 6–4, 6–1 in the final.

== Seeds ==
1. (India) Rithvik Choudary Bollipalli / (India) Ramkumar Ramanathan (first round)
2. (Australia) Patrick Harper / (United States) Daniel Milavsky (first round)
3. (Japan) Yuta Shimizu / (Japan) Seita Watanabe (semifinals)
4. (Venezuela) Luis David Martínez / (United Kingdom) Johannus Monday (quarterfinals, withdrew)

== Draw ==
Key

- Q = Qualifier
- WC = Wild card
- LL = Lucky loser
- Alt = Alternate
- ITF = ITF entry
- PR = Protected ranking
- SR = Special ranking
- SE = Special exempt
- JE = Junior exempt
- JR = Junior Accelerator Programme entrant
- CO = College Accelerator Programme entrant
- NG = Next Gen Accelerator Program entrant
- w/o = Walkover
- r = Retired
- d = Defaulted

First round
1	(India) RC Bollipalli (India) R Ramanathan	6	6^{4}	[5]
(United States) P Kumar (United States) K Poling	4	7^{7}	[10]
(United Kingdom) D Evans (United Kingdom) H Searle	7^{7}	3	[10]
(United States) J Sheehy (United States) T Zink	6^{3}	6	[7]
3	(Japan) Y Shimizu (Japan) S Watanabe	6	2	[15]
(United States) A Fenty (Venezuela) B Pérez	3	6	[13]
(Argentina) Valentín Basel (Brazil) Bruno Oliveira	6	7^{7}
(China) F Sun (Chinese Taipei) T-l Wu	3	6^{4}
(Australia) C Puttergill (Australia) D Sweeny	6^{2}	6	[7]
(Antigua and Barbuda) J Maginley (United States) B Shick	7^{7}	3	[10]
WC	(United States) M Krueger (United States) S Papa	6	6^{4}	[7]
4	(Venezuela) LD Martínez (United Kingdom) J Monday	4	7^{7}	[10]
(Germany) D Masur (Australia) K Pearson	3	7^{7}	[10]
Alt	(Canada) N Arseneault (Canada) D Martin	6	6^{3}	[3]
WC	(Australia) Eric Padgham (Czech Republic) Jakub Vrba	6	6
2	(Australia) P Harper (United States) D Milavsky	3	4

Quarterfinals
(United States) P Kumar (United States) K Poling	6	3	[10]
(United Kingdom) D Evans (United Kingdom) H Searle	4	6	[6]
3	(Japan) Y Shimizu (Japan) S Watanabe	w/o
(Argentina) V Basel (Brazil) B Oliveira
(Antigua and Barbuda) J Maginley (United States) B Shick	w/o
4	(Venezuela) LD Martínez (United Kingdom) J Monday
(Germany) D Masur (Australia) K Pearson
WC	(Australia) E Padgham (Czech Republic) J Vrba	w/o

Semifinals
(United States) P Kumar (United States) K Poling	6	3	[10]
3	(Japan) Y Shimizu (Japan) S Watanabe	3	6	[4]
(Antigua and Barbuda) J Maginley (United States) B Shick	7	6^{5}	[7]
WC	(Australia) E Padgham (Czech Republic) J Vrba	5	7^{7}	[10]

Final
(United States) P Kumar (United States) K Poling	6	6
WC	(Australia) E Padgham (Czech Republic) J Vrba	4	1
