= 2025 Little Rock Challenger – Singles =

Singles
- 2025 Little Rock Challenger

Final
- Champion: (United States) Patrick Kypson
- Runner-up: (United States) Michael Zheng
- Score: 6–1, 1–6, 7–5

Events
Singles	Doubles
← 2024 ·	Little Rock Challenger	· 2026 →

Mitchell Krueger was the defending champion but lost in the first round to Patrick Kypson.

Kypson won the title after defeating Michael Zheng 6–1, 1–6, 7–5 in the final.

== Seeds ==
1. (United States) Mitchell Krueger (first round)
2. (Canada) Liam Draxl (semifinals)
3. (Japan) Yuta Shimizu (second round)
4. (Canada) Alexis Galarneau (second round)
5. (Argentina) Santiago Rodríguez Taverna (first round, retired)
6. (France) Antoine Escoffier (first round)
7. (Tunisia) Aziz Dougaz (first round)
8. (United Kingdom) Paul Jubb (second round)

== Draw ==
Key

- Q = Qualifier
- WC = Wild card
- LL = Lucky loser
- Alt = Alternate
- ITF = ITF entry
- PR = Protected ranking
- SR = Special ranking
- SE = Special exempt
- JE = Junior exempt
- JR = Junior Accelerator Programme entrant
- CO = College Accelerator Programme entrant
- NG = Next Gen Accelerator Program entrant
- w/o = Walkover
- r = Retired
- d = Defaulted

=== Finals ===
Semifinals
Q	(United States) Patrick Kypson	6	6
(Ecuador) Andrés Andrade	3	2
WC	(United States) Michael Zheng	6	6
2	(Canada) Liam Draxl	4	4

Final
Q	(United States) Patrick Kypson	6	1	7
WC	(United States) Michael Zheng	1	6	5

=== Top half ===
First round
1	(United States) M Krueger	3	6	4
Q	(United States) P Kypson	6	4	6
(United States) T Zink	7^{7}	5
(Chinese Taipei) T-l Wu	6^{3}	4^{r}
(Japan) R Noguchi	6	6
(China) Y Zhou	4	4
(Brazil) K Sell	5	3
8	(United Kingdom) P Jubb	7	6
4	(Canada) A Galarneau	6	6
(United States) G Nanda	3	3
(Japan) N Nakagawa	6	6
WC	(United States) Alexander Kotzen	4	4
PR	I Ivashka	6^{4}	2
(Ecuador) A Andrade	7^{7}	6
Q	(United States) S Kozlov	5	6	6
7	(Tunisia) A Dougaz	7	3	2

Second round
Q	(United States) P Kypson	6	6
(United States) T Zink	4	4
(Japan) R Noguchi	7	6
8	(United Kingdom) P Jubb	5	3
4	(Canada) A Galarneau	3	4
(Japan) N Nakagawa	6	6
(Ecuador) A Andrade	6	4	7
Q	(United States) S Kozlov	1	6	5

Quarterfinals
Q	(United States) P Kypson	6	6
(Japan) R Noguchi	1	2
(Japan) N Nakagawa	4	1
(Ecuador) A Andrade	6	6

Semifinals
Q	(United States) P Kypson	6	6
(Ecuador) A Andrade	3	2

=== Bottom half ===
First round
6	(France) A Escoffier	5	6^{4}
Q	(Colombia) A Soriano Barrera	7	7^{7}
WC	(United States) M Zheng	6	6
(United States) Christian Langmo	2	2
LL	(South Korea) H Chung	3	2
(United States) A Martin	6	6
(Colombia) N Mejía	6^{4}	0
3	(Japan) Y Shimizu	7^{7}	6
5	(Argentina) S Rodríguez Taverna	5	1^{r}
Q	(Japan) Kenta Miyoshi	7	5
Q	(United States) D Milavsky	6	6
(Australia) M Bouzige	4	4
(United States) Patrick Maloney	5	6	6
Q	(Argentina) N Kicker	7	2	3
JR	(Spain) R Jódar	5	2
2	(Canada) L Draxl	7	6

Second round
Q	(Colombia) A Soriano Barrera	2	1
WC	(United States) M Zheng	6	6
(United States) A Martin	6	6
3	(Japan) Y Shimizu	1	4
Q	(Japan) K Miyoshi	6	6
Q	(United States) D Milavsky	2	4
(United States) P Maloney	4	1
2	(Canada) L Draxl	6	6

Quarterfinals
WC	(United States) M Zheng	6	6
(United States) A Martin	4	2
Q	(Japan) K Miyoshi	6^{4}	4
2	(Canada) L Draxl	7^{7}	6

Semifinals
WC	(United States) M Zheng	6	6
2	(Canada) L Draxl	4	4
