= 2024 Little Rock Challenger – Singles =

Singles
- 2024 Little Rock Challenger

Final
- Champion: (United States) Mitchell Krueger
- Runner-up: (Japan) Yuta Shimizu
- Score: 6–3, 6–4

Events
Singles	Doubles
← 2023 ·	Little Rock Challenger	· 2025 →

Mark Lajal was the defending champion but chose not to defend his title.

Mitchell Krueger won the title after defeating Yuta Shimizu 6–3, 6–4 in the final.

== Seeds ==
1. (Canada) Alexis Galarneau (quarterfinals)
2. (Hong Kong) Coleman Wong (first round)
3. (South Korea) Hong Seong-chan (second round)
4. (Chinese Taipei) Hsu Yu-hsiou (first round)
5. (Australia) Bernard Tomic (second round, retired)
6. (United States) Mitchell Krueger (champion)
7. (United States) Ethan Quinn (first round)
8. (Jordan) Abdullah Shelbayh (semifinals)

== Draw ==
=== Key ===
- Q = Qualifier
- WC = Wild card
- LL = Lucky loser
- Alt = Alternate
- SE = Special exempt
- PR = Protected ranking
- ITF = ITF entry
- JE = Junior exempt
- w/o = Walkover
- r = Retired
- d = Defaulted
- SR = Special ranking

=== Finals ===
Semifinals
6	(United States) Mitchell Krueger	3	6	6
8	(Jordan) Abdullah Shelbayh	6	1	4
(United States) Nishesh Basavareddy	6^{3}	0
(Japan) Yuta Shimizu	7^{7}	6

Final
6	(United States) Mitchell Krueger	6	6
(Japan) Yuta Shimizu	3	4

=== Top half ===
First round
1	(Canada) A Galarneau	6	6
(Japan) H Moriya	2	3
(Chinese Taipei) T-l Wu	6	4	6
(Colombia) N Mejía	3	6	1
(United States) A Mayo	6	5	7^{7}
(United States) N Chappell	3	7	6^{4}
(Canada) L Draxl	3	6	4
6	(United States) M Krueger	6	3	6
3	(South Korea) S-c Hong	6	3	6
WC	(United States) M Cassone	4	6	2
WC	(India) M Sasikumar	0	6	2
(United States) B Holt	6	3	6
(United States) C Williams	6	2	6
Q	(Japan) Y Takahashi	4	6	4
(Jamaica) B Bicknell	6^{4}	2
8	(Jordan) A Shelbayh	7^{7}	6

Second round
1	(Canada) A Galarneau	6	6
(Chinese Taipei) T-l Wu	1	4
(United States) A Mayo	6^{7}	3
6	(United States) M Krueger	7^{9}	6
3	(South Korea) S-c Hong	2	3
(United States) B Holt	6	6
(United States) C Williams	4	6	4
8	(Jordan) A Shelbayh	6	3	6

Quarterfinals
1	(Canada) A Galarneau	3	1
6	(United States) M Krueger	6	6
(United States) B Holt	6^{4}	6	5
8	(Jordan) A Shelbayh	7^{7}	2	7

Semifinals
6	(United States) M Krueger	3	6	6
8	(Jordan) A Shelbayh	6	1	4

=== Bottom half ===
First round
7	(United States) E Quinn	5	4
(United States) N Basavareddy	7	6
Q	(United States) Christian Langmo	7	6
(India) R Ramanathan	5	2
Q	(Mexico) E Escobedo	3	4
WC	(United States) T Svajda	6	6
Q	(United States) A Martin	7^{7}	6
4	(Chinese Taipei) Y-h Hsu	6^{1}	2
5	(Australia) B Tomic	3	6	6
(United States) T-S Kwiatkowski	6	2	3
(Japan) Y Shimizu	7	6
Q	(United States) K Smith	5	3
(United States) S Kozlov	1	5
Q	(United States) Rudy Quan	6	7
(Ecuador) A Andrade	6^{5}	6	6
2	(Hong Kong) C Wong	7^{7}	4	3

Second round
(United States) N Basavareddy	7	7
Q	(United States) C Langmo	5	5
WC	(United States) T Svajda	6	7^{7}
Q	(United States) A Martin	4	6^{5}
5	(Australia) B Tomic	1	0^{r}
(Japan) Y Shimizu	6	0
Q	(United States) R Quan	6	3	6
(Ecuador) A Andrade	3	6	3

Quarterfinals
(United States) N Basavareddy	6	6
WC	(United States) T Svajda	2	2
(Japan) Y Shimizu	6	6
Q	(United States) R Quan	4	3

Semifinals
(United States) N Basavareddy	6^{3}	0
(Japan) Y Shimizu	7^{7}	6
