= 2019 Little Rock Challenger – Singles =

Singles
- 2019 Little Rock Challenger

Final
- Champion: (Israel) Dudi Sela
- Runner-up: (South Korea) Lee Duck-hee
- Score: 6–1, 4–3 ret.

Events
Singles	Doubles
Little Rock Challenger	· 2021 →

This was the first edition of the tournament.

Dudi Sela won the title after Lee Duck-hee retired trailing 1–6, 3–4 in the final.

== Seeds ==
All seeds receive a bye into the second round.

1. (United States) Michael Mmoh (second round)
2. (South Korea) Chung Hyeon (withdrew)
3. (United States) Noah Rubin (third round)
4. (United States) Mitchell Krueger (quarterfinals)
5. (United States) Donald Young (second round)
6. (United States) Christopher Eubanks (quarterfinals)
7. (Barbados) Darian King (semifinals)
8. (Israel) Dudi Sela (champion)
9. (Ecuador) Roberto Quiroz (second round)
10. (United States) Tim Smyczek (third round)
11. (China) Li Zhe (third round)
12. (South Korea) Lee Duck-hee (final, retired)
13. (United States) Thai-Son Kwiatkowski (semifinals)
14. (Canada) Filip Peliwo (second round)
15. (United States) Collin Altamirano (third round)
16. (Brazil) João Menezes (third round)
17. (United States) Maxime Cressy (second round)

== Draw ==
Key

- Q = Qualifier
- WC = Wild card
- LL = Lucky loser
- Alt = Alternate
- ITF = ITF entry
- PR = Protected ranking
- SR = Special ranking
- SE = Special exempt
- JE = Junior exempt
- JR = Junior Accelerator Programme entrant
- CO = College Accelerator Programme entrant
- NG = Next Gen Accelerator Program entrant
- w/o = Walkover
- r = Retired
- d = Defaulted

=== Finals ===
Quarterfinals
(United States) Ryan Shane	3	1
8	(Israel) Dudi Sela	6	6
13	(United States) Thai-Son Kwiatkowski	7^{8}	6
6	(United States) Christopher Eubanks	6^{6}	3
12	(South Korea) Lee Duck-hee	4	6	6
4	(United States) Mitchell Krueger	6	3	1
7	(Barbados) Darian King	6	6^{2}	7
PR	(United States) Raymond Sarmiento	3	7^{7}	5

Semifinals
8	(Israel) Dudi Sela	6	7^{11}
13	(United States) Thai-Son Kwiatkowski	3	6^{9}
12	(South Korea) Lee Duck-hee	6	6
7	(Barbados) Darian King	0	0

Final
8	(Israel) Dudi Sela	6	4
12	(South Korea) Lee Duck-hee	1	3^{r}

=== Top half ===
==== Section 1 ====
First round
(Brazil) T Seyboth Wild	7	4	2
(United States) R Shane	5	6	6
PR	(United States) D Nguyen	6	6^{5}	6
(United States) K King	2	7^{7}	3
Alt	(Colombia) A González	4	4
ITF	(United States) A Ritschard	6	6
(United States) Evan Song	7	6
(Hungary) Z Piros	5	4

Second round
1	(United States) M Mmoh	6	5	3
(United States) R Shane	3	7	6
PR	(United States) D Nguyen	4	6	6
14	(Canada) F Peliwo	6	1	0
9	(Ecuador) R Quiroz	2	5
ITF	(United States) A Ritschard	6	7
(United States) E Song	3	4
8	(Israel) D Sela	6	6

Third round
(United States) R Shane	3	6	6
PR	(United States) D Nguyen	6	3	4
ITF	(United States) A Ritschard	4	6	3
8	(Israel) D Sela	6	4	6

Quarterfinals
(United States) R Shane	3	1
8	(Israel) D Sela	6	6

==== Section 2 ====
First round
Q	(Brazil) O Luz	6	5	7^{7}
(Japan) Makoto Ochi	4	7	6^{4}
ITF	(United States) Ma Redlicki	2	1
(Argentina) MF Descotte	6	6
WC	(United States) Jason Kros	1	2
(United States) Roy Smith	6	6
(United States) Mi Redlicki	3	6	2
ITF	(Argentina) F Cerúndolo	6	2	6

Second round
3	(United States) N Rubin	6	6
Q	(Brazil) O Luz	4	3
(Argentina) MF Descotte	4	0
13	(United States) T-S Kwiatkowski	6	6
10/WC	(United States) T Smyczek	3	7	6
(United States) R Smith	6	5	1
ITF	(Argentina) F Cerúndolo	7	6^{1}	6^{5}
6	(United States) C Eubanks	5	7^{7}	7^{7}

Third round
3	(United States) N Rubin	5	5
13	(United States) T-S Kwiatkowski	7	7
10/WC	(United States) T Smyczek	6^{1}	3
6	(United States) C Eubanks	7^{7}	6

Quarterfinals
13	(United States) T-S Kwiatkowski	7^{8}	6
6	(United States) C Eubanks	6^{6}	3

=== Bottom half ===
==== Section 3 ====
First round
(United States) Jared Hiltzik	6	4	3
(China) Zh Zhang	3	6	6
ITF	(Peru) N Álvarez	4	7^{7}	3
ITF	(United States) Jordi Arconada	6	6^{5}	6
(South Korea) J-s Nam	6	2
(Dominican Republic) V Estrella Burgos	3	1^{r}
(Argentina) F Mena	6	6
WC	(United States) A Kovacevic	4	3

Second round
5	(United States) D Young	4	6	3
(China) Zh Zhang	6	3	6
ITF	(United States) J Arconada	1	4
12	(South Korea) D-h Lee	6	6
16	(Brazil) J Menezes	5	6	6
(South Korea) J-s Nam	7	1	2
(Argentina) F Mena	3	2
4	(United States) M Krueger	6	6

Third round
(China) Zh Zhang	4	7^{7}	6^{3}
12	(South Korea) D-h Lee	6	6^{3}	7^{7}
16	(Brazil) J Menezes	4	7	6^{4}
4	(United States) M Krueger	6	5	7^{7}

Quarterfinals
12	(South Korea) D-h Lee	4	6	6
4	(United States) M Krueger	6	3	1

==== Section 4 ====
First round
WC	(United States) O Crawford	7	7^{7}
(Ukraine) I Marchenko	5	6^{5}
(United States) S Kozlov	7	6
Q	(United States) G Johns	5	3
(United States) A Sarkissian	6	5	6
WC	(United States) B Holt	2	7	4
PR	(Spain) C Gómez-Herrera	3	6^{3}
PR	(United States) R Sarmiento	6	7^{7}

Second round
7	(Barbados) D King	6	6
WC	(United States) O Crawford	4	4
(United States) S Kozlov	3	7	0
11	(China) Z Li	6	5	6
15	(United States) C Altamirano	6	6
(United States) A Sarkissian	3	1
PR	(United States) R Sarmiento	7^{7}	6
17	(United States) M Cressy	6^{5}	3

Third round
7	(Barbados) D King	7^{9}	6
11	(China) Z Li	6^{7}	3
15	(United States) C Altamirano	4	4
PR	(United States) R Sarmiento	6	6

Quarterfinals
7	(Barbados) D King	6	6^{2}	7
PR	(United States) R Sarmiento	3	7^{7}	5
