= 2019 Little Rock Challenger – Doubles =

Doubles
- 2019 Little Rock Challenger

Final
- Champions: (Argentina) Matías Franco Descotte (Brazil) Orlando Luz
- Runners-up: (Philippines) Treat Huey (United States) Max Schnur
- Score: 7–5, 1–6, [12–10]

Events
Singles	Doubles
Little Rock Challenger	· 2021 →

This was the first edition of the tournament.

Matías Franco Descotte and Orlando Luz won the title after defeating Treat Huey and Max Schnur 7–5, 1–6, [12–10] in the final.

== Seeds ==
1. (Venezuela) Roberto Maytín / (United States) Jackson Withrow (quarterfinals)
2. (Venezuela) Luis David Martínez / (Ecuador) Roberto Quiroz (quarterfinals)
3. (Finland) Harri Heliövaara / (United States) Alex Lawson (first round)
4. (India) Arjun Kadhe / (Ukraine) Volodymyr Uzhylovskyi (first round)

== Draw ==
=== Key ===
- Q = Qualifier
- WC = Wild card
- LL = Lucky loser
- Alt = Alternate
- SE = Special exempt
- PR = Protected ranking
- ITF = ITF entry
- JE = Junior exempt
- w/o = Walkover
- r = Retired
- d = Defaulted
- SR = Special ranking

First round
1	(Venezuela) R Maytín (United States) J Withrow	6	6
PR	(Ukraine) I Marchenko (China) Zh Zhang	3	4
WC	(Philippines) T Huey (United States) M Schnur	6	6
(South Korea) D-h Lee (Canada) F Peliwo	1	1
4	(India) A Kadhe (Ukraine) V Uzhylovskyi	2	5
PR	(China) Z Li (Israel) D Sela	6	7
(United States) C Altamirano (United States) T-S Kwiatkowski	4	3
(Mexico) H Hach Verdugo (United States) D Young	6	6
WC	(United States) H Johnson (United States) Y Johnson	7^{7}	7^{7}
WC	(United States) N Pasha (United States) A Reed	6^{3}	6^{3}
(United States) JP Fruttero (South Korea) J-s Nam	6	7^{7}
3	(Finland) H Heliövaara (United States) A Lawson	4	6^{4}
(Barbados) D King (United States) N Rubin	3	6^{4}
ITF	(Argentina) MF Descotte (Brazil) O Luz	6	7^{7}
ITF	(United States) M Cressy (Portugal) B Saraiva	6	4	[8]
2	(Venezuela) LD Martínez (Ecuador) R Quiroz	2	6	[10]

Quarterfinals
1	(Venezuela) R Maytín (United States) J Withrow	4	7^{9}	[15]
WC	(Philippines) T Huey (United States) M Schnur	6	6^{7}	[17]
PR	(China) Z Li (Israel) D Sela	1	2
(Mexico) H Hach Verdugo (United States) D Young	6	6
WC	(United States) H Johnson (United States) Y Johnson	7	4	[2]
(United States) JP Fruttero (South Korea) J-s Nam	5	6	[10]
ITF	(Argentina) MF Descotte (Brazil) O Luz	7	6
2	(Venezuela) LD Martínez (Ecuador) R Quiroz	5	3

Semifinals
WC	(Philippines) T Huey (United States) M Schnur	3	6	[10]
(Mexico) H Hach Verdugo (United States) D Young	6	3	[5]
(United States) JP Fruttero (South Korea) J-s Nam	6	6^{6}	[10]
ITF	(Argentina) MF Descotte (Brazil) O Luz	0	7^{8}	[12]

Final
WC	(Philippines) T Huey (United States) M Schnur	5	6	[10]
ITF	(Argentina) MF Descotte (Brazil) O Luz	7	1	[12]
