= 2022 Little Rock Challenger – Singles =

Singles
- 2022 Little Rock Challenger

Final
- Champion: (Australia) Jason Kubler
- Runner-up: (Chinese Taipei) Wu Tung-lin
- Score: 6–0, 6–2

Events
Singles	Doubles
← 2021 ·	Little Rock Challenger	· 2023 →

Jack Sock was the defending champion but chose not to defend his title.

Jason Kubler won the title after defeating Wu Tung-lin 6–0, 6–2 in the final.

== Seeds ==
1. (United States) J. J. Wolf (first round)
2. (Ecuador) Emilio Gómez (second round)
3. (United States) Christopher Eubanks (second round)
4. (Australia) Jason Kubler (champion)
5. (United States) Michael Mmoh (first round)
6. (Turkey) Altuğ Çelikbilek (first round)
7. (Australia) Rinky Hijikata (second round)
8. (Chinese Taipei) Wu Tung-lin (final)

== Draw ==
=== Key ===
- Q = Qualifier
- WC = Wild card
- LL = Lucky loser
- Alt = Alternate
- SE = Special exempt
- PR = Protected ranking
- ITF = ITF entry
- JE = Junior exempt
- w/o = Walkover
- r = Retired
- d = Defaulted
- SR = Special ranking

=== Finals ===
Semifinals
(United States) Aleksandar Kovacevic	6	3	4
8	(Chinese Taipei) Wu Tung-lin	2	6	6
4	(Australia) Jason Kubler	6	6
WC	(United States) Ben Shelton	4	4

Final
8	(Chinese Taipei) Wu Tung-lin	0	2
4	(Australia) Jason Kubler	6	6

=== Top half ===
First round
1	(United States) J. J. Wolf	2	7	4
(United States) A Kovacevic	6	5	6
(United States) U Blanch	6	7^{7}
(Ecuador) R Quiroz	4	6^{5}
(Japan) K Uchida	4	6	6
Q	(United States) S Kirchheimer	6	3	4
Q	(United States) M Cassone	2	6	6
5	(United States) M Mmoh	6	3	2
3	(United States) C Eubanks	6	6
(Turkey) E Kırkın	3	4
(Germany) S Fanselow	6	3	1
(Japan) Y Uchiyama	4	6	6
Q	(United States) Z Svajda	3	7^{7}	3
(Colombia) N Mejía	6	6^{3}	6
(China) Zh Zhang	3	4
8	(Chinese Taipei) T-l Wu	6	6

Second round
(United States) A Kovacevic	6	4	6
(United States) U Blanch	4	6	3
(Japan) K Uchida	4	3
Q	(United States) M Cassone	6	6
3	(United States) C Eubanks	6	6^{3}	3
(Japan) Y Uchiyama	1	7^{7}	6
(Colombia) N Mejía	1	3
8	(Chinese Taipei) T-l Wu	6	6

Quarterfinals
(United States) A Kovacevic	7^{7}	6
Q	(United States) M Cassone	6^{5}	1
(Japan) Y Uchiyama	6^{4}	1
8	(Chinese Taipei) T-l Wu	7^{7}	6

Semifinals
(United States) A Kovacevic	6	3	4
8	(Chinese Taipei) T-l Wu	2	6	6

=== Bottom half ===
First round
7	(Australia) R Hijikata	6^{3}	6	6
(Kazakhstan) D Yevseyev	7^{7}	4	3
PR	(Australia) A Harris	1	4
WC	(United States) B Holt	6	6
Q	(Brazil) Gilbert Klier Júnior	6^{9}	2
(Japan) H Moriya	7^{11}	6
(Argentina) G Villanueva	1	6^{4}
4	(Australia) J Kubler	6	7^{7}
6	(Turkey) A Çelikbilek	2	4
(Tunisia) M Jaziri	6	6
Q	(Argentina) RA Burruchaga	6	6^{4}	6
WC	(United States) D Young	3	7^{7}	2
WC	(United States) B Shelton	7^{7}	6
(United States) C Harrison	6^{4}	4
Q	(Spain) A Menéndez Maceiras	1	2
2	(Ecuador) E Gómez	6	6

Second round
7	(Australia) R Hijikata	2	6	2
WC	(United States) B Holt	6	3	6
(Japan) H Moriya	3	3
4	(Australia) J Kubler	6	6
(Tunisia) M Jaziri	6	6^{5}	4
Q	(Argentina) RA Burruchaga	4	7^{7}	6
WC	(United States) B Shelton	6	6
2	(Ecuador) E Gómez	4	4

Quarterfinals
WC	(United States) B Holt	6^{5}	3
4	(Australia) J Kubler	7^{7}	6
Q	(Argentina) RA Burruchaga	5	1
WC	(United States) B Shelton	7	6

Semifinals
4	(Australia) J Kubler	6	6
WC	(United States) B Shelton	4	4
