= 2023 Little Rock Challenger =

- Date: May 29 – June 4
- Edition: 4th
- Surface: Hard
- Location: Little Rock, Arkansas, United States

Champions

Singles
- (Estonia) Mark Lajal

Doubles
- (South Korea) Nam Ji-sung / (New Zealand) Artem Sitak
← 2022 ·	Little Rock Challenger	· 2024 →

The 2023 UAMS Health Little Rock Open was a professional tennis tournament played on hardcourts. It was the fourth edition of the tournament which was part of the 2023 ATP Challenger Tour. It took place in Little Rock, Arkansas, United States from May 29 to June 4, 2023.

== Singles main-draw entrants ==
=== Seeds ===
Country	Player	Rank^{1}	Seed
TPE	Wu Tung-lin	182	1
USA	Nicolas Moreno de Alboran	187	2
AUS	Marc Polmans	194	3
FRA	Antoine Escoffier	202	4
JPN	Yasutaka Uchiyama	221	5
ARG	Juan Pablo Ficovich	223	6
TUN	Aziz Dougaz	226	7
USA	Tennys Sandgren	244	8

- ^{1} Rankings are as of May 22, 2023.

=== Other entrants ===
The following players received wildcards into the singles main draw:

- (United States) Tristan Boyer
- (United States) Aidan Mayo
- (United States) Nathan Ponwith

The following player received entry into the singles main draw using a protected ranking:

- (United States) Thai-Son Kwiatkowski

The following players received entry from the qualifying draw:

- (Germany) Peter Gojowczyk
- (Poland) Maks Kaśnikowski
- (United States) Christian Langmo
- (Australia) Adam Walton
- (United States) Michael Zheng
- (Kazakhstan) Beibit Zhukayev

== Champions ==
=== Singles ===
- (Estonia) Mark Lajal def. (Kazakhstan) Beibit Zhukayev 6–4, 7–5.

=== Doubles ===
- (South Korea) Nam Ji-sung / (New Zealand) Artem Sitak def. (Canada) Alexis Galarneau / (United States) Nicolas Moreno de Alboran 6–4, 6–4.
