= 2024 Little Rock Challenger – Doubles =

Doubles
- 2024 Little Rock Challenger

Final
- Champions: (Canada) Liam Draxl (Canada) Benjamin Sigouin
- Runners-up: (India) Rithvik Choudary Bollipalli (Mexico) Hans Hach Verdugo
- Score: 6–4, 3–6, [10–7]

Events
Singles	Doubles
- Little Rock Challenger

Nam Ji-sung and Artem Sitak were the defending champions but chose not to defend their title.

Liam Draxl and Benjamin Sigouin won the title after defeating Rithvik Choudary Bollipalli and Hans Hach Verdugo 6–4, 3–6, [10–7] in the final.

== Seeds ==
1. (United Kingdom) Joshua Paris / (India) Ramkumar Ramanathan (semifinals)
2. (India) Rithvik Choudary Bollipalli / (Mexico) Hans Hach Verdugo (final)
3. (United States) Thai-Son Kwiatkowski / (United States) Alex Lawson (semifinals)
4. (Australia) Patrick Harper / (United Kingdom) David Stevenson (first round)

== Draw ==
Key

- Q = Qualifier
- WC = Wild card
- LL = Lucky loser
- Alt = Alternate
- ITF = ITF entry
- PR = Protected ranking
- SR = Special ranking
- SE = Special exempt
- JE = Junior exempt
- JR = Junior Accelerator Programme entrant
- CO = College Accelerator Programme entrant
- NG = Next Gen Accelerator Program entrant
- w/o = Walkover
- r = Retired
- d = Defaulted

=== Draw ===
First round
1	(United Kingdom) J Paris (India) R Ramanathan	6^{3}	6	[10]
(Chinese Taipei) Y-h Hsu (Japan) Y Shimizu	7^{7}	4	[4]
(Japan) H Moriya (Japan) Y Takahashi	1	1
(Ecuador) A Andrade (Jordan) A Shelbayh	6	6
4	(Australia) P Harper (United Kingdom) D Stevenson	3	5
(Canada) L Draxl (Canada) B Sigouin	6	7
WC	(United States) Boris Kozlov (United States) Axel Nefve	2	6	[10]
(Colombia) N Mejía (Colombia) A Urrea	6	3	[8]
PR	(United States) B Kuzuhara (United States) D Novikov	3	6	[10]
(United States) N Chappell (Chinese Taipei) T-l Wu	6	4	[7]
(Canada) K Stevenson (United States) Tennyson Whiting	1	7^{7}	[9]
3	(United States) T-S Kwiatkowski (United States) A Lawson	6	6^{3}	[11]
(Northern Mariana Islands) C Sinclair (Hong Kong) C Wong	2	2
(United States) M Kiger (United States) E Quinn	6	6
WC	(United States) N Basavareddy (United States) C Williams	7	3	[7]
2	(India) RC Bollipalli (Mexico) H Hach Verdugo	5	6	[10]

Quarterfinals
1	(United Kingdom) J Paris (India) R Ramanathan	6	6
(Ecuador) A Andrade (Jordan) A Shelbayh	3	4
(Canada) L Draxl (Canada) B Sigouin	7	6^{5}	[10]
WC	(United States) B Kozlov (United States) A Nefve	5	7^{7}	[4]
PR	(United States) B Kuzuhara (United States) D Novikov	1	1
3	(United States) T-S Kwiatkowski (United States) A Lawson	6	6
(United States) M Kiger (United States) E Quinn	3	3
2	(India) RC Bollipalli (Mexico) H Hach Verdugo	6	6

Semifinals
1	(United Kingdom) J Paris (India) R Ramanathan	6	4	[14]
(Canada) L Draxl (Canada) B Sigouin	4	6	[16]
3	(United States) T-S Kwiatkowski (United States) A Lawson	1	1
2	(India) RC Bollipalli (Mexico) H Hach Verdugo	6	6

Final
(Canada) L Draxl (Canada) B Sigouin	6	3	[10]
2	(India) RC Bollipalli (Mexico) H Hach Verdugo	4	6	[7]
