= 2026 Little Rock Challenger – Singles =

Singles
- 2026 Little Rock Challenger

Final
- Champion: (United States) Colton Smith
- Runner-up: (United States) Michael Mmoh
- Score: 6–2, 6–4

Events
Singles	Doubles
- Little Rock Challenger

Patrick Kypson was the defending champion but chose not to defend his title.

Colton Smith won the title after defeating Michael Mmoh 6–2, 6–4 in the final.

== Seeds ==
1. (Australia) Dane Sweeny (first round)
2. (Colombia) Nicolás Mejía (second round)
3. (United States) Colton Smith (champion)
4. (Australia) Bernard Tomic (quarterfinals)
5. (United States) Michael Mmoh (final)
6. (Lithuania) Edas Butvilas (first round)
7. (United States) Murphy Cassone (first round)
8. (China) Sun Fajing (second round)

== Draw ==
Key

- Q = Qualifier
- WC = Wild card
- LL = Lucky loser
- Alt = Alternate
- ITF = ITF entry
- PR = Protected ranking
- SR = Special ranking
- SE = Special exempt
- JE = Junior exempt
- JR = Junior Accelerator Programme entrant
- CO = College Accelerator Programme entrant
- NG = Next Gen Accelerator Program entrant
- w/o = Walkover
- r = Retired
- d = Defaulted

=== Finals ===
Semifinals
(United States) Andre Ilagan	3	5
3	(United States) Colton Smith	6	7
5	(United States) Michael Mmoh	1	6	6
Q	(Canada) Justin Boulais	6	1	2

Final
3	(United States) Colton Smith	6	6
5	(United States) Michael Mmoh	2	4

=== Top half ===
First round
1	(Australia) D Sweeny	3	4
Q	(Australia) Enzo Aguiard	6	6
(United States) Andre Ilagan	6^{3}	6	7
(Japan) Y Uchiyama	7^{7}	4	5
Q	(United Kingdom) J Monday	6	6
WC	(United States) B Shick	4	4
PR	(United States) A Mayo	7^{7}	7^{7}
6	(Lithuania) E Butvilas	6^{3}	6^{4}
3	(United States) C Smith	6	7
NG	(United States) T Svajda	2	5
WC	(United States) D Milavsky	3	7^{7}	1
(Chinese Taipei) T-l Wu	6	6^{3}	0^{r}
PR	(Australia) B Ellis	4	7	3
(United States) T Zink	6	5	6
Q	(United States) Ronald Hohmann	6	1	6
7	(United States) M Cassone	4	6	3

Second round
Q	(Australia) E Aguiard	6^{6}	1^{r}
(United States) A Ilagan	7^{8}	3
Q	(United Kingdom) J Monday	6^{3}	5
PR	(United States) A Mayo	7^{7}	7
3	(United States) C Smith	6	6
WC	(United States) D Milavsky	3	2
(United States) T Zink	6	6
Q	(United States) R Hohmann	3	2

Quarterfinals
(United States) A Ilagan	7^{12}	6^{4}	6
PR	(United States) A Mayo	6^{10}	7^{7}	3
3	(United States) C Smith	6	7^{7}
(United States) T Zink	4	6^{4}

Semifinals
(United States) A Ilagan	3	5
3	(United States) C Smith	6	7

=== Bottom half ===
First round
5	(United States) M Mmoh	5	6	6
(Japan) H Matsuoka	7	3	1
LL	(Japan) H Moriya	2	3
CO	(France) T Legout	6	6
(United States) A Martin	6^{8}	6^{5}
(Japan) Y Shimizu	7^{10}	7^{7}
(Jamaica) B Bicknell	6	4	4
4	(Australia) B Tomic	3	6	6
8	(China) F Sun	6	6
WC	(United States) Dakotah Bobo	2	1
LL	(Japan) J Friend	6	6
(United States) M Krueger	2	3
Q	E Arutiunian	3	2
Q	(Canada) J Boulais	6	6
Q	(United Kingdom) H Searle	3	3
2	(Colombia) N Mejía	6	6

Second round
5	(United States) M Mmoh	6	6
CO	(France) T Legout	2	2
(Japan) Y Shimizu	6	6^{4}	5
4	(Australia) B Tomic	4	7^{7}	7
8	(China) F Sun	2	2
LL	(Japan) J Friend	6	6
Q	(Canada) J Boulais	6	6
2	(Colombia) N Mejía	4	4

Quarterfinals
5	(United States) M Mmoh	6	6
4	(Australia) B Tomic	3	3
LL	(Japan) J Friend	6	3	5
Q	(Canada) J Boulais	2	6	7

Semifinals
5	(United States) M Mmoh	1	6	6
Q	(Canada) J Boulais	6	1	2
