= 2025 Little Rock Challenger – Doubles =

Doubles
- 2025 Little Rock Challenger

Final
- Champions: (Tunisia) Aziz Dougaz (France) Antoine Escoffier
- Runners-up: (Ecuador) Andrés Andrade (Colombia) Nicolás Mejía
- Score: 6–2, 6–3

Events
Singles	Doubles
- Little Rock Challenger

Liam Draxl and Benjamin Sigouin were the defending champions but only Sigouin chose to defend his title, partnering Joshua Sheehy. He withdrew before his first round match.

Aziz Dougaz and Antoine Escoffier won the title after defeating Andrés Andrade and Nicolás Mejía 6–2, 6–3 in the final.

== Seeds ==
1. (Australia) Blake Bayldon / (United States) Reese Stalder (quarterfinals)
2. (United States) George Goldhoff / (United States) Trey Hilderbrand (quarterfinals)
3. (India) Niki Kaliyanda Poonacha / (India) Jeevan Nedunchezhiyan (semifinals)
4. (Brazil) Luís Britto / (Thailand) Pruchya Isaro (semifinals)

== Draw ==
Key

- Q = Qualifier
- WC = Wild card
- LL = Lucky loser
- Alt = Alternate
- ITF = ITF entry
- PR = Protected ranking
- SR = Special ranking
- SE = Special exempt
- JE = Junior exempt
- JR = Junior Accelerator Programme entrant
- CO = College Accelerator Programme entrant
- NG = Next Gen Accelerator Program entrant
- w/o = Walkover
- r = Retired
- d = Defaulted

=== Draw ===
First round
1	(Australia) B Bayldon (United States) R Stalder	6	7
(Japan) R Noguchi (Japan) Y Shimizu	3	5
Alt	(Canada) L Draxl (Canada) Alvin Nicholas Tudorica
(Tunisia) A Dougaz (France) A Escoffier	w/o
3	(India) N Kaliyanda Poonacha (India) J Nedunchezhiyan	7	6
(United States) M Kiger (United States) Patrick Maloney	5	4
(New Zealand) F Reynolds (New Zealand) J Watt	6^{10}	7^{7}	[12]
WC	(United States) Ronald Hohmann (United States) Alexander Kotzen	7^{12}	6^{3}	[10]
(Mexico) H Hach Verdugo (United States) T Zink	4	3
(Australia) P Harper (Australia) K Pearson	6	6
WC	(United States) A Martin (United States) G Nanda	6	4	[7]
4	(Brazil) L Britto (Thailand) P Isaro	3	6	[10]
(Ecuador) A Andrade (Colombia) N Mejía	6	7
(Canada) JC Aguilar (United States) P Kumar	0	5
Alt	(China) A Wang (China) Y Zhou	6^{3}	6	[7]
2	(United States) G Goldhoff (United States) T Hilderbrand	7^{7}	4	[10]

Quarterfinals
1	(Australia) B Bayldon (United States) R Stalder	4	7	[8]
(Tunisia) A Dougaz (France) A Escoffier	6	5	[10]
3	(India) N Kaliyanda Poonacha (India) J Nedunchezhiyan	2	6	[11]
(New Zealand) F Reynolds (New Zealand) J Watt	6	2	[9]
(Australia) P Harper (Australia) K Pearson	4	4
4	(Brazil) L Britto (Thailand) P Isaro	6	6
(Ecuador) A Andrade (Colombia) N Mejía	7	6^{5}	[11]
2	(United States) G Goldhoff (United States) T Hilderbrand	5	7^{7}	[9]

Semifinals
(Tunisia) A Dougaz (France) A Escoffier	7^{7}	6
3	(India) N Kaliyanda Poonacha (India) J Nedunchezhiyan	6^{4}	3
4	(Brazil) L Britto (Thailand) P Isaro	4	6	[8]
(Ecuador) A Andrade (Colombia) N Mejía	6	4	[10]

Final
(Tunisia) A Dougaz (France) A Escoffier	6	6
(Ecuador) A Andrade (Colombia) N Mejía	2	3
