= 2023 French Open – Men's singles =

Tennis championship

Men's singles
- 2023 French Open

Final
- Champion: (Serbia) Novak Djokovic
- Runner-up: (Norway) Casper Ruud
- Score: 7–6^{(7–1)}, 6–3, 7–5

Details
- Draw: 128
- Seeds: 32

Events
Singles	men	women		boys	girls
Doubles	men	women	mixed	boys	girls
WC Singles	men	women	quad	boys	girls
WC Doubles	men	women	quad	boys	girls

Qualification
Singles	men	women
- French Open

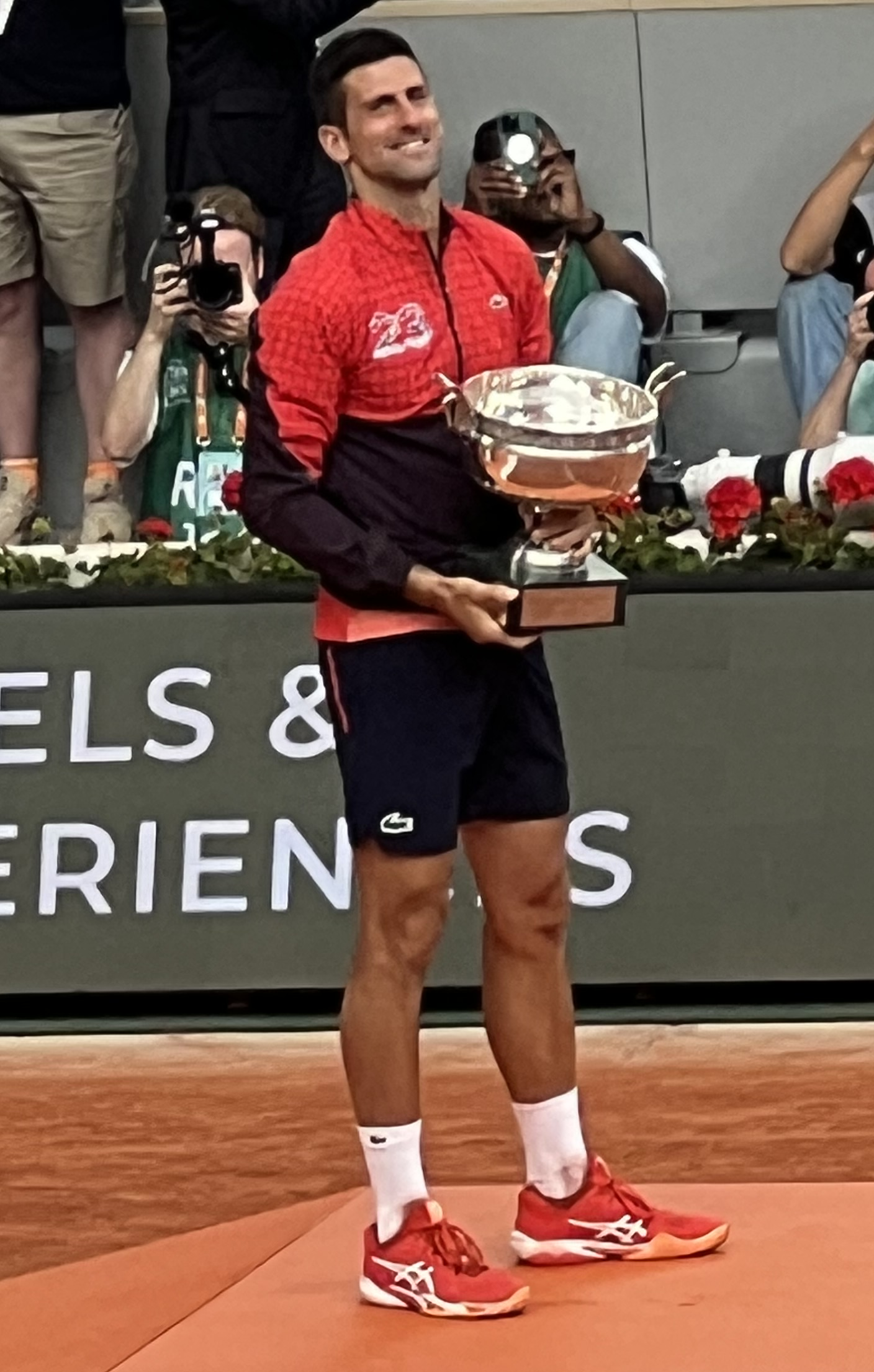
Novak Djokovic with the Coupe des Mousquetaires

Novak Djokovic defeated Casper Ruud in the final, 7–6^{(7–1)}, 6–3, 7–5 to win the men's singles tennis title at the 2023 French Open. It was his third French Open title and record-breaking 23rd men's singles major title overall, surpassing Rafael Nadal's all-time record. Djokovic became the first man to achieve a triple career Grand Slam in singles, and the oldest champion in French Open history at the age of 36 years and 20 days. By winning the title, Djokovic reclaimed the world No. 1 singles ranking from Carlos Alcaraz; Daniil Medvedev and Stefanos Tsitsipas were also in contention for the top position.

Nadal was the reigning champion, but withdrew due to a left hip injury. This was the first time the 14-time champion missed the tournament since his debut in 2005. With his withdrawal, Nadal fell out of the top 100 of the ATP rankings for the first time since 2003.

This was the first major since the 2003 Wimbledon Championships where neither of the top two seeds were members of the Big Four.

== Seeds ==
1. (Spain) Carlos Alcaraz (semifinals)
2. Daniil Medvedev (first round)
3. (Serbia) Novak Djokovic (champion)
4. (Norway) Casper Ruud (final)
5. (Greece) Stefanos Tsitsipas (quarterfinals)
6. (Denmark) Holger Rune (quarterfinals)
7. Andrey Rublev (third round)
8. (Italy) Jannik Sinner (second round)
9. (United States) Taylor Fritz (third round)
10. (Canada) Félix Auger-Aliassime (first round)
11. Karen Khachanov (quarterfinals)
12. (United States) Frances Tiafoe (third round)
13. (Poland) Hubert Hurkacz (third round)
14. (United Kingdom) Cameron Norrie (third round)
15. (Croatia) Borna Ćorić (third round)
16. (United States) Tommy Paul (second round)
17. (Italy) Lorenzo Musetti (fourth round)
18. (Australia) Alex de Minaur (second round)
19. (Spain) Roberto Bautista Agut (second round)
20. (United Kingdom) Dan Evans (first round)
21. (Germany) Jan-Lennard Struff (first round)
22. (Germany) Alexander Zverev (semifinals)
23. (Argentina) Francisco Cerúndolo (fourth round)
24. (United States) Sebastian Korda (second round)
25. (Netherlands) Botic van de Zandschulp (first round)
26. (Canada) Denis Shapovalov (third round)
27. (Japan) Yoshihito Nishioka (fourth round)
28. (Bulgaria) Grigor Dimitrov (fourth round)
29. (Spain) Alejandro Davidovich Fokina (third round)
30. (United States) Ben Shelton (first round)
31. (Serbia) Miomir Kecmanović (first round)
32. (Spain) Bernabé Zapata Miralles (first round)

Click on the seed number of a player to go to their draw section.

== Draw ==
Key

- Q = Qualifier
- WC = Wild card
- LL = Lucky loser
- Alt = Alternate
- ITF = ITF entry
- PR = Protected ranking
- SR = Special ranking
- SE = Special exempt
- JE = Junior exempt
- JR = Junior Accelerator Programme entrant
- CO = College Accelerator Programme entrant
- NG = Next Gen Accelerator Program entrant
- w/o = Walkover
- r = Retired
- d = Defaulted

=== Finals ===
Quarterfinals
1	(Spain) Carlos Alcaraz	6	6	7^{7}
5	(Greece) Stefanos Tsitsipas	2	1	6^{5}
3	(Serbia) Novak Djokovic	4	7^{7}	6	6
11	Karen Khachanov	6	6^{0}	2	4
6	(Denmark) Holger Rune	1	2	6	3
4	(Norway) Casper Ruud	6	6	3	6
22	(Germany) Alexander Zverev	6	3	6	6
(Argentina) Tomás Martín Etcheverry	4	6	3	4

Semifinals
1	(Spain) Carlos Alcaraz	3	7	1	1
3	(Serbia) Novak Djokovic	6	5	6	6
4	(Norway) Casper Ruud	6	6	6
22	(Germany) Alexander Zverev	3	4	0

Final
3	(Serbia) Novak Djokovic	7^{7}	6	7
4	(Norway) Casper Ruud	6^{1}	3	5

=== Top half ===
==== Section 1 ====
First round
1	(Spain) C Alcaraz	6	6	7
Q	(Italy) F Cobolli	0	2	5
(Australia) C O'Connell	0	2	4
(Japan) T Daniel	6	6	6
(Italy) M Arnaldi	2	6	6	6
(Colombia) DE Galán	6	3	0	2
(United States) B Nakashima	4	5	6	6	3
26	(Canada) D Shapovalov	6	7	4	3	6
17	(Italy) L Musetti	7	6	6
(Sweden) M Ymer	5	2	4
A Shevchenko	7	4	6	7^{7}
(Germany) O Otte	5	6	1	6^{2}
Q	(France) L Pouille	6	6	6
LL	(Austria) J Rodionov	2	4	3
WC	(France) B Paire	5	6	6	1	4
14	(United Kingdom) C Norrie	7	4	3	6	6

Second round
1	(Spain) C Alcaraz	6	3	6	6
(Japan) T Daniel	1	6	1	2
(Italy) M Arnaldi	2	6	3	3
26	(Canada) D Shapovalov	6	3	6	6
17	(Italy) L Musetti	6	6	6
A Shevchenko	1	1	2
Q	(France) L Pouille	1	3	3
14	(United Kingdom) C Norrie	6	6	6

Third round
1	(Spain) C Alcaraz	6	6	6
26	(Canada) D Shapovalov	1	4	2
17	(Italy) L Musetti	6	6	6
14	(United Kingdom) C Norrie	1	2	4

Fourth round
1	(Spain) C Alcaraz	6	6	6
17	(Italy) L Musetti	3	2	2

==== Section 2 ====
First round
10	(Canada) F Auger-Aliassime	4	4	3
(Italy) F Fognini	6	6	6
(Australia) J Kubler	1	6	6	3	6
LL	(Argentina) F Díaz Acosta	6	3	4	6	1
Q	(Austria) S Ofner	6	7^{8}	6
(United States) M Cressy	4	6^{6}	2
(United States) M McDonald	4	5	4
24	(United States) S Korda	6	7	6
32	(Spain) B Zapata Miralles	6	7^{7}	2	0	4
(Argentina) D Schwartzman	1	6^{5}	6	6	6
(United States) J Isner	4	7	6^{3}	6	6^{9}
(Portugal) N Borges	6	5	7^{7}	4	7^{11}
(Spain) R Carballés Baena	7^{7}	6	6
Q	(United States) E Nava	6^{5}	3	2
PR	(Czech Republic) J Veselý	5	3	6	6^{7}
5	(Greece) S Tsitsipas	7	6	4	7^{9}

Second round
(Italy) F Fognini	6	7^{7}	6
(Australia) J Kubler	4	6^{5}	2
Q	(Austria) S Ofner	6	7^{7}	6
24	(United States) S Korda	3	6^{1}	4
(Argentina) D Schwartzman	7^{7}	6	6
(Portugal) N Borges	6^{3}	4	3
(Spain) R Carballés Baena	3	6^{4}	2
5	(Greece) S Tsitsipas	6	7^{7}	6

Third round
(Italy) F Fognini	7	3	5	6	4
Q	(Austria) S Ofner	5	6	7	1	6
(Argentina) D Schwartzman	2	2	3
5	(Greece) S Tsitsipas	6	6	6

Fourth round
Q	(Austria) S Ofner	5	3	0
5	(Greece) S Tsitsipas	7	6	6

==== Section 3 ====
First round
3	(Serbia) N Djokovic	6	6	7^{7}
(United States) A Kovacevic	3	2	6^{1}
(Hungary) M Fucsovics	6	5	6	6
WC	(France) H Grenier	3	7	1	3
(France) L Van Assche	6	6	6
(Italy) M Cecchinato	1	1	3
WC	(France) A Fils	1	6	3	3
29	(Spain) A Davidovich Fokina	6	4	6	6
19	(Spain) R Bautista Agut	7^{7}	6	6
(China) Y Wu	6^{4}	1	1
Q	(China) J Shang	6	6	2	3	1
(Peru) JP Varillas	4	2	6	6	6
Q	(Spain) P Martínez	4	6	6	5	3
(Netherlands) T Griekspoor	6	2	0	7	6
(Belgium) D Goffin	3	7	4	6	4
13	(Poland) H Hurkacz	6	5	6	2	6

Second round
3	(Serbia) N Djokovic	7^{7}	6	6
(Hungary) M Fucsovics	6^{2}	0	3
(France) L Van Assche	4	3	6^{6}
29	(Spain) A Davidovich Fokina	6	6	7^{8}
19	(Spain) R Bautista Agut	6	6	3	1	1
(Peru) JP Varillas	1	4	6	6	6
(Netherlands) T Griekspoor	3	7	7^{15}	6^{5}	4
13	(Poland) H Hurkacz	6	5	6^{13}	7^{7}	6

Third round
3	(Serbia) N Djokovic	7^{7}	7^{7}	6
29	(Spain) A Davidovich Fokina	6^{4}	6^{5}	2
(Peru) JP Varillas	3	6	7^{7}	4	6
13	(Poland) H Hurkacz	6	3	6^{3}	6	2

Fourth round
3	(Serbia) N Djokovic	6	6	6
(Peru) JP Varillas	3	2	2

==== Section 4 ====
First round
11	K Khachanov	3	1	6	6	6
(France) C Lestienne	6	6	2	1	3
WC	(United States) P Kypson	3	2	6	1
Q	(Moldova) R Albot	6	6	4	6
(Switzerland) S Wawrinka	7^{7}	6	6^{2}	1	6
(Spain) A Ramos Viñolas	6^{5}	4	7^{7}	6	4
WC	(Australia) T Kokkinakis	6	6	6
20	(United Kingdom) D Evans	4	4	4
30	(United States) B Shelton	4	6	3	3
(Italy) L Sonego	6	3	6	6
(France) A Mannarino	3	3	1
(France) U Humbert	6	6	6
WC	(France) A Cazaux	1	3	6	4
(France) C Moutet	6	6	4	6
(Serbia) L Djere	1	6	3	4
7	A Rublev	6	3	6	6

Second round
11	K Khachanov	6	6	6
Q	(Moldova) R Albot	3	4	2
(Switzerland) S Wawrinka	6	5	3	7^{7}	3
WC	(Australia) T Kokkinakis	3	7	6	6^{4}	6
(Italy) L Sonego	6	6	7^{7}
(France) U Humbert	4	3	6^{3}
(France) C Moutet	4	2	6	3
7	A Rublev	6	6	3	6

Third round
11	K Khachanov	6	6	3	7^{7}
WC	(Australia) T Kokkinakis	4	1	6	6^{5}
(Italy) L Sonego	5	0	6	7^{7}	6
7	A Rublev	7	6	3	6^{5}	3

Fourth round
11	K Khachanov	1	6	7^{9}	6
(Italy) L Sonego	6	4	6^{7}	1

=== Bottom half ===
==== Section 5 ====
First round
6	(Denmark) H Rune	6	3	7^{7}	6
(United States) C Eubanks	4	6	6^{2}	2
PR	(France) G Monfils	3	6	7	1	7
(Argentina) S Báez	6	3	5	6	5
WC	(France) G Mpetshi Perricard	6^{3}	6	6	5	1
Q	(Argentina) GA Olivieri	7^{7}	4	4	7	6
Q	(Italy) A Vavassori	5	2	7^{10}	7^{7}	7^{11}
31	(Serbia) M Kecmanović	7	6	6^{8}	6^{3}	6^{9}
23	(Argentina) F Cerúndolo	6	2	7^{7}	6
(Spain) J Munar	1	6	6^{5}	1
(Brazil) T Monteiro	3	5	7^{8}	7^{7}	4
LL	(Germany) Y Hanfmann	6	7	6^{6}	6^{2}	6
(France) R Gasquet	4	6	2	6^{4}
(France) A Rinderknech	6	2	6	7^{7}
(United States) M Mmoh	2	1	1
9	(United States) T Fritz	6	6	6

Second round
6	(Denmark) H Rune	w/o
PR	(France) G Monfils
Q	(Argentina) GA Olivieri	7^{9}	3	6	7^{7}
Q	(Italy) A Vavassori	6^{7}	6	4	6^{3}
23	(Argentina) F Cerúndolo	6	6	6
LL	(Germany) Y Hanfmann	3	3	4
(France) A Rinderknech	6	4	3	4
9	(United States) T Fritz	2	6	6	6

Third round
6	(Denmark) H Rune	6	6	6
Q	(Argentina) GA Olivieri	4	1	3
23	(Argentina) F Cerúndolo	3	6	6	7
9	(United States) T Fritz	6	3	4	5

Fourth round
6	(Denmark) H Rune	7^{7}	3	6	1	7^{10}
23	(Argentina) F Cerúndolo	6^{3}	6	4	6	6^{7}

==== Section 6 ====
First round
16	(United States) T Paul	6	6	6
LL	(Switzerland) D Stricker	3	2	4
(Chile) N Jarry	6	6	6
PR	(Bolivia) H Dellien	4	4	2
Q	(Serbia) H Medjedovic	0	2	6	0
(United States) M Giron	6	6	1	6
(Czech Republic) J Lehečka	7	1	6	3	6
21	(Germany) J-L Struff	5	6	3	6	1
25	(Netherlands) B van de Zandschulp	2	6	3	4
Q	(Argentina) TA Tirante	6	4	6	6
(China) Z Zhang	6	4
(Serbia) D Lajović	1	1^{r}
(Kazakhstan) A Bublik	0	6	6	3	5
Q	(Italy) G Zeppieri	6	4	4	6	7
Q	(Sweden) E Ymer	4	3	2
4	(Norway) C Ruud	6	6	6

Second round
16	(United States) T Paul	6	1	4	5
(Chile) N Jarry	3	6	6	7
(United States) M Giron	6	6	6
(Czech Republic) J Lehečka	2	3	2
Q	(Argentina) TA Tirante	6^{3}	3	4
(China) Z Zhang	7^{7}	6	6
Q	(Italy) G Zeppieri	3	2	6	5
4	(Norway) C Ruud	6	6	4	7

Third round
(Chile) N Jarry	6	6	6^{7}	6
(United States) M Giron	2	3	7^{9}	3
(China) Z Zhang	6	4	1	4
4	(Norway) C Ruud	4	6	6	6

Fourth round
(Chile) N Jarry	6^{3}	5	5
4	(Norway) C Ruud	7^{7}	7	7

==== Section 7 ====
First round
8	(Italy) J Sinner	6	6	6
(France) A Müller	1	4	1
(Germany) D Altmaier	6	6	6
(Switzerland) M-A Hüsler	3	4	4
(Finland) E Ruusuvuori	6	6^{7}	5	6	6
(France) G Barrère	2	7^{9}	7	1	4
Q	(Kazakhstan) T Skatov	0	3	2
28	(Bulgaria) G Dimitrov	6	6	6
22	(Germany) A Zverev	7^{8}	7^{7}	6
PR	(South Africa) L Harris	6^{6}	6^{0}	1
WC	(France) H Gaston	1	6^{4}	4
(Slovakia) A Molčan	6	7^{7}	6
(Australia) A Popyrin	3	7^{7}	1	2
Q	A Karatsev	6	6^{4}	6	6
(Serbia) F Krajinović	3	4	2
12	(United States) F Tiafoe	6	6	6

Second round
8	(Italy) J Sinner	7^{7}	6^{7}	6	6^{4}	5
(Germany) D Altmaier	6^{0}	7^{9}	1	7^{7}	7
(Finland) E Ruusuvuori	6^{4}	3	4
28	(Bulgaria) G Dimitrov	7^{7}	6	6
22	(Germany) A Zverev	6	6	6
(Slovakia) A Molčan	4	2	1
Q	A Karatsev	6	3	5	2
12	(United States) F Tiafoe	3	6	7	6

Third round
(Germany) D Altmaier	4	3	1
28	(Bulgaria) G Dimitrov	6	6	6
22	(Germany) A Zverev	3	7^{7}	6	7^{7}
12	(United States) F Tiafoe	6	6^{3}	1	6^{5}

Fourth round
28	(Bulgaria) G Dimitrov	1	4	3
22	(Germany) A Zverev	6	6	6

==== Section 8 ====
First round
15	(Croatia) B Ćorić	7^{7}	6^{5}	6	6
(Argentina) F Coria	6^{3}	7^{7}	3	3
(Austria) D Thiem	3	2	7^{7}	6	2
(Argentina) P Cachin	6	6	6^{1}	4	6
(United Kingdom) J Draper	4	0^{r}
(Argentina) TM Etcheverry	6	1
I Ivashka	1	7	1	3
18	(Australia) A de Minaur	6	5	6	6
27	(Japan) Y Nishioka	1	3	6	6	6
(United States) JJ Wolf	6	6	4	3	3
(Australia) M Purcell	7	1	6	6
(Australia) J Thompson	5	6	4	4
(France) Q Halys	4	7^{9}	6	6^{4}	6^{4}
PR	(Argentina) G Pella	6	6^{7}	2	7^{7}	7^{10}
Q	(Brazil) T Seyboth Wild	7^{7}	6^{6}	2	6	6
2	D Medvedev	6^{5}	7^{8}	6	3	4

Second round
15	(Croatia) B Ćorić	6	4	4	6	6
(Argentina) P Cachin	3	6	6	3	4
(Argentina) TM Etcheverry	6	7^{7}	6
18	(Australia) A de Minaur	3	6^{2}	3
27	(Japan) Y Nishioka	4	6	7	6
(Australia) M Purcell	6	2	5	4
PR	(Argentina) G Pella	3	6	4	3
Q	(Brazil) T Seyboth Wild	6	3	6	6

Third round
15	(Croatia) B Ćorić	3	6^{5}	2
(Argentina) TM Etcheverry	6	7^{7}	6
27	(Japan) Y Nishioka	3	7^{10}	2	6	6
Q	(Brazil) T Seyboth Wild	6	6^{8}	6	4	0

Fourth round
(Argentina) TM Etcheverry	7^{10}	6	6
27	(Japan) Y Nishioka	6^{8}	0	1

== Seeded players ==
The following are the seeded players. Seedings are based on ATP rankings as of 22 May 2023. Rankings and points before are as of 29 May 2023.

Because the tournament takes place one week later this year, players are defending points from the 2022 French Open, as well as tournaments that took place during the week of 6 June 2022 ('s-Hertogenbosch, Stuttgart, and 2022 ATP Challenger Tour tournaments). Points from the 2022 French Open are listed first in the "Points defending" column.

Seed	Rank	Player	Points before	Points defending	Points earned	Points after	Status
1	1	(Spain) Carlos Alcaraz	6,815	360	720	7,175	Semifinals lost to (Serbia) Novak Djokovic (3)
2	2	Daniil Medvedev	6,330	180+150	10+90	6,100	First round lost to (Brazil) Thiago Seyboth Wild (Q)
3	3	(Serbia) Novak Djokovic	5,955	360	2,000	7,595	Champion, defeated (Norway) Casper Ruud (4)
4	4	(Norway) Casper Ruud	4,960	1,200	1,200	4,960	Runner-up, lost to (Serbia) Novak Djokovic (3)
5	5	(Greece) Stefanos Tsitsipas	4,775	180+45	360+10	4,920	Quarterfinals lost to (Spain) Carlos Alcaraz (1)
6	6	(Denmark) Holger Rune	4,375	360	360	4,375	Quarterfinals lost to (Norway) Casper Ruud (4)
7	7	Andrey Rublev	4,270	360	90	4,000	Third round lost to (Italy) Lorenzo Sonego
8	9	(Italy) Jannik Sinner	3,435	180	45	3,300	Second round lost to (Germany) Daniel Altmaier
9	8	(United States) Taylor Fritz	3,470	45	90	3,515	Third round lost to (Argentina) Francisco Cerúndolo (23)
10	10	(Canada) Félix Auger-Aliassime	3,100	180+90	10+10	2,850	First round lost to (Italy) Fabio Fognini
11	11	Karen Khachanov	2,945	180	360	3,125	Quarterfinals lost to (Serbia) Novak Djokovic (3)
12	12	(United States) Frances Tiafoe	2,790	45	90	2,835	Third round lost to (Germany) Alexander Zverev (22)
13	14	(Poland) Hubert Hurkacz	2,525	180	90	2,435	Third round lost to (Peru) Juan Pablo Varillas
14	13	(United Kingdom) Cameron Norrie	2,565	90	90	2,565	Third round lost to (Italy) Lorenzo Musetti (17)
15	16	(Croatia) Borna Ćorić	2,410	45+25	90+0	2,430	Third round lost to (Argentina) Tomás Martín Etcheverry
16	17	(United States) Tommy Paul	2,170	10	45	2,205	Second round lost to (Chile) Nicolás Jarry
17	18	(Italy) Lorenzo Musetti	2,040	10+125	180+10	2,095	Fourth round lost to (Spain) Carlos Alcaraz (1)
18	19	(Australia) Alex de Minaur	1,870	10	45	1,905	Second round lost to (Argentina) Tomás Martín Etcheverry
19	24	(Spain) Roberto Bautista Agut	1,485	0	45	1,530	Second round lost to (Peru) Juan Pablo Varillas
20	25	(United Kingdom) Dan Evans	1,480	45+125	10+10	1,330	First round lost to (Australia) Thanasi Kokkinakis (WC)
21	28	(Germany) Jan-Lennard Struff	1,447	0+20	10+0	1,437	First round lost to (Czech Republic) Jiří Lehečka
22	27	(Germany) Alexander Zverev	1,450	720	720	1,450	Semifinals lost to (Norway) Casper Ruud (4)
23	23	(Argentina) Francisco Cerúndolo	1,485	10	180	1,655	Fourth round lost to (Denmark) Holger Rune (6)
24	30	(United States) Sebastian Korda	1,265	90	45	1,220	Second round lost to (Austria) Sebastian Ofner (Q)
25	31	(Netherlands) Botic van de Zandschulp	1,215	90	10	1,135	First round lost to (Argentina) Thiago Agustín Tirante (Q)
26	32	(Canada) Denis Shapovalov	1,210	10	90	1,290	Third round lost to (Spain) Carlos Alcaraz (1)
27	33	(Japan) Yoshihito Nishioka	1,181	10	180	1,351	Fourth round lost to (Argentina) Tomás Martín Etcheverry
28	29	(Bulgaria) Grigor Dimitrov	1,275	90	180	1,365	Fourth round lost to (Germany) Alexander Zverev (22)
29	34	(Spain) Alejandro Davidovich Fokina	1,115	10	90	1,195	Third round lost to (Serbia) Novak Djokovic (3)
30	36	(United States) Ben Shelton	1,095	36^{†}	10	1,069	First round lost to (Italy) Lorenzo Sonego
31	37	(Serbia) Miomir Kecmanović	1,065	90	10	985	First round lost to (Italy) Andrea Vavassori (Q)
32	38	(Spain) Bernabé Zapata Miralles	1,051	205	10	856	First round lost to (Argentina) Diego Schwartzman

† The player did not qualify for the main draw in 2022 but is defending points from an ATP Challenger Tour event (Little Rock).

=== Withdrawn players ===
The following players would have been seeded, but withdrew before the tournament began.

Rank	Player	Points before	Points defending	Points after	Withdrawal reason
15	(Spain) Rafael Nadal	2,445	2,000	445	Hip injury
20	(Italy) Matteo Berrettini	1,832	0+250	1,582	Abdominal injury
21	(Spain) Pablo Carreño Busta	1,740	10	1,730	Elbow injury
22	(Croatia) Marin Čilić	1,510	720	790	Knee injury
26	(Australia) Nick Kyrgios	1,465	0+90	1,375	Foot injury

== Other entry information ==
=== Wild cards ===
- (France) Arthur Cazaux
- (France) Arthur Fils
- (France) Hugo Gaston
- (France) Hugo Grenier
- (Australia) Thanasi Kokkinakis
- (United States) Patrick Kypson
- (France) Giovanni Mpetshi Perricard
- (France) Benoît Paire

=== Protected ranking ===
- (France) Gaël Monfils (35)
- (South Africa) Lloyd Harris (47)
- (Bolivia) Hugo Dellien (73)
- (Argentina) Guido Pella (75)
- (Czech Republic) Jiří Veselý (94)

=== Qualifiers ===
- (Moldova) Radu Albot
- (Italy) Flavio Cobolli
- Aslan Karatsev
- (Spain) Pedro Martínez
- (Serbia) Hamad Medjedovic
- (United States) Emilio Nava
- (Austria) Sebastian Ofner
- (Argentina) Genaro Alberto Olivieri
- (France) Lucas Pouille
- (Brazil) Thiago Seyboth Wild
- (China) Shang Juncheng
- (Kazakhstan) Timofey Skatov
- (Argentina) Thiago Agustín Tirante
- (Italy) Andrea Vavassori
- (Sweden) Elias Ymer
- (Italy) Giulio Zeppieri

=== Lucky losers ===
- (Argentina) Facundo Díaz Acosta
- (Germany) Yannick Hanfmann
- (Austria) Jurij Rodionov
- (Switzerland) Dominic Stricker

=== Withdrawals ===
The entry list was released based on the ATP rankings for the week of 17 April 2023.

- ‡ (United States) Jenson Brooksby (71) → replaced by Alexander Shevchenko (98)
- ‡ (South Korea) Kwon Soon-woo (77) → replaced by (Belgium) David Goffin (99)
- ‡ (Australia) Nick Kyrgios (24) → replaced by (Japan) Taro Daniel (100)
- ‡ (Spain) Rafael Nadal (15) → replaced by (Austria) Dominic Thiem (101)
- ‡ (Spain) Pablo Carreño Busta (17) → replaced by (United States) Michael Mmoh (102)
- ‡ (Croatia) Marin Čilić (23) → replaced by (Italy) Fabio Fognini (103)
- ‡ (Italy) Matteo Berrettini (22) → replaced by (United States) Aleksandar Kovacevic (104)
- ‡ (United Kingdom) Andy Murray (52) → replaced by (Italy) Matteo Arnaldi (105)
- @ (Chile) Cristian Garín (86) → replaced by (Switzerland) Dominic Stricker (LL)
- @ (United Kingdom) Kyle Edmund (48 PR) → replaced by (Austria) Jurij Rodionov (LL)
- @ (France) Jérémy Chardy (88 PR) → replaced by (Argentina) Facundo Díaz Acosta (LL)
- § (France) Benjamin Bonzi (44) → replaced by (Germany) Yannick Hanfmann (LL)

‡ – withdrew from entry list before qualifying began
@ – withdrew from entry list after qualifying began
§ – withdrew from main draw

Preceded by 2023 Australian Open – Men's singles	Grand Slam men's singles	Succeeded by 2023 Wimbledon Championships – Men's singles
