= 2019 Little Rock Challenger =

- Date: 3–9 June
- Edition: 1st
- Surface: Hard
- Location: Little Rock, Arkansas, United States

Champions

Singles
- (Israel) Dudi Sela

Doubles
- (Argentina) Matías Franco Descotte / (Brazil) Orlando Luz
- Little Rock Challenger

The 2019 Baptist Health Little Rock Open was a professional tennis tournament played on hard courts. It was the first edition of the tournament which was part of the 2019 ATP Challenger Tour. It took place in Little Rock, Arkansas, United States from June 3 to June 9, 2019.

== Singles main-draw entrants ==
=== Seeds ===
Country	Player	Rank^{1}	Seed
USA	Michael Mmoh	141	1
~~KOR~~	~~Chung Hyeon~~	~~156~~	~~2~~
USA	Noah Rubin	172	3
USA	Mitchell Krueger	188	4
USA	Donald Young	193	5
USA	Christopher Eubanks	196	6
BAR	Darian King	200	7
ISR	Dudi Sela	209	8
ECU	Roberto Quiroz	217	9
USA	Tim Smyczek	224	10
CHN	Li Zhe	239	11
KOR	Lee Duck-hee	243	12
USA	Thai-Son Kwiatkowski	248	13
CAN	Filip Peliwo	267	14
USA	Collin Altamirano	277	15
BRA	João Menezes	287	16
USA	Maxime Cressy	316	17

- ^{1} Rankings are as of 27 May 2019.

=== Other entrants ===
The following players received wildcards into the singles main draw:

- (United States) Oliver Crawford
- (United States) Brandon Holt
- (United States) Aleksandar Kovacevic
- (United States) Jason Kros
- (United States) Tim Smyczek

The following players received entry into the singles main draw using protected rankings:

- (Spain) Carlos Gómez-Herrera
- (United States) Daniel Nguyen
- (United States) Raymond Sarmiento

The following player received entry into the singles main draw as an alternate:

- (Colombia) Alejandro González

The following players received entry into the singles main draw using their ITF World Tennis Ranking:

- (Peru) Nicolás Álvarez
- (United States) Jordi Arconada
- (Argentina) Francisco Cerúndolo
- (United States) Martin Redlicki
- (United States) Alexander Ritschard

The following players received entry from the qualifying draw:

- (United States) Garrett Johns
- (Brazil) Orlando Luz

== Champions ==
=== Singles ===
- (Israel) Dudi Sela def. (South Korea) Lee Duck-hee 6–1, 4–3 ret.

=== Doubles ===
- (Argentina) Matías Franco Descotte / (Brazil) Orlando Luz def. (Philippines) Treat Huey / (United States) Max Schnur 7–5, 1–6, [12–10].
