= 2022 Little Rock Challenger =

- Date: May 30 – June 5
- Edition: 3rd
- Surface: Hard
- Location: Little Rock, Arkansas, United States

Champions

Singles
- (Australia) Jason Kubler

Doubles
- (Australia) Andrew Harris / (United States) Christian Harrison
← 2021 ·	Little Rock Challenger	· 2023 →

The 2022 Little Rock Challenger was a professional tennis tournament played on hard courts. It was the third edition of the tournament which was part of the 2022 ATP Challenger Tour. It took place in Little Rock, Arkansas, United States from May 30 to June 5, 2022.

== Singles main-draw entrants ==
=== Seeds ===
Country	Player	Rank^{1}	Seed
USA	J. J. Wolf	126	1
ECU	Emilio Gómez	152	2
USA	Christopher Eubanks	157	3
AUS	Jason Kubler	160	4
USA	Michael Mmoh	176	5
TUR	Altuğ Çelikbilek	180	6
AUS	Rinky Hijikata	234	7
TPE	Wu Tung-lin	248	8

- ^{1} Rankings are as of May 23, 2022.

=== Other entrants ===
The following players received wildcards into the singles main draw:

- (United States) Brandon Holt
- (United States) Ben Shelton
- (United States) Donald Young

The following player received entry into the singles main draw using a protected ranking:

- (Australia) Andrew Harris

The following players received entry from the qualifying draw:

- (Argentina) Román Andrés Burruchaga
- (United States) Murphy Cassone
- (United States) Strong Kirchheimer
- (Brazil) Gilbert Klier Júnior
- (Spain) Adrián Menéndez Maceiras
- (United States) Zachary Svajda

== Champions ==
=== Singles ===
- (Australia) Jason Kubler def. (Chinese Taipei) Wu Tung-lin 6–0, 6–2.

=== Doubles ===
- (Australia) Andrew Harris / (United States) Christian Harrison def. (United States) Robert Galloway / (United States) Max Schnur 6–3, 6–4.
