= 2021 Little Rock Challenger – Singles =

Singles
- 2021 Little Rock Challenger

Final
- Champion: (United States) Jack Sock
- Runner-up: (Ecuador) Emilio Gómez
- Score: 7–5, 6–4

Events
Singles	Doubles
- Little Rock Challenger

Dudi Sela was the defending champion but chose not to defend his title.

Jack Sock won the title after defeating Emilio Gómez 7–5, 6–4 in the final.

== Seeds ==
1. (Chinese Taipei) Jason Jung (quarterfinals)
2. (United States) Michael Mmoh (withdrew)
3. (Ecuador) Emilio Gómez (final)
4. (United States) Ernesto Escobedo (second round)
5. (United States) Mitchell Krueger (semifinals)
6. (United States) Thai-Son Kwiatkowski (quarterfinals)
7. (Dominican Republic) Roberto Cid Subervi (first round)
8. (United States) Christopher Eubanks (second round)
9. (Canada) Peter Polansky (first round)

== Draw ==
Key

- Q = Qualifier
- WC = Wild card
- LL = Lucky loser
- Alt = Alternate
- ITF = ITF entry
- PR = Protected ranking
- SR = Special ranking
- SE = Special exempt
- JE = Junior exempt
- JR = Junior Accelerator Programme entrant
- CO = College Accelerator Programme entrant
- NG = Next Gen Accelerator Program entrant
- w/o = Walkover
- r = Retired
- d = Defaulted

=== Finals ===
Semifinals
5	(United States) Mitchell Krueger	4	6	3
(United States) Jack Sock	6	1	6
3	(Ecuador) Emilio Gómez	6	6
(Portugal) Gonçalo Oliveira	4	2

Final
(United States) Jack Sock	7	6
3	(Ecuador) Emilio Gómez	5	4

=== Top half ===
First round
1	(Chinese Taipei) J Jung	6	6
(United States) C Harrison	1	2
(Chile) N Jarry	4	2
(Japan) H Moriya	6	6
(Barbados) D King	6	6
(Argentina) TA Tirante	4	4
WC	(United States) Z Khan	2	4
5	(United States) M Krueger	6	6
4	(United States) E Escobedo	6	6
(United States) D Young	3	0
(United States) J Sock	6	6
(Ecuador) R Quiroz	3	1
(United States) A Ritschard	7^{7}	4	6
(United States) K King	6^{5}	6	4
Q	(United States) S Kozlov	2	1
6	(United States) T-S Kwiatkowski	6	6

Second round
1	(Chinese Taipei) J Jung	6	6
(Japan) H Moriya	3	4
(Barbados) D King	3	2
5	(United States) M Krueger	6	6
4	(United States) E Escobedo	7^{9}	6^{9}	6^{5}
(United States) J Sock	6^{7}	7^{11}	7^{7}
(United States) A Ritschard	7	3	2
6	(United States) T-S Kwiatkowski	5	6	6

Quarterfinals
1	(Chinese Taipei) J Jung	6	2	1
5	(United States) M Krueger	3	6	6
(United States) J Sock	6^{3}	7^{7}	6
6	(United States) T-S Kwiatkowski	7^{7}	6^{5}	4

Semifinals
5	(United States) M Krueger	4	6	3
(United States) J Sock	6	1	6

=== Bottom half ===
First round
8	(United States) C Eubanks	6	7^{7}
(Colombia) N Mejía	3	6^{3}
(United States) U Blanch	5	6	6
Q	(United States) Z Svajda	7	3	3
Q	(Canada) A Galarneau	6	6
(United States) JC Aragone	3	3
(Argentina) A Velotti	6^{2}	3
3	(Ecuador) E Gómez	7^{7}	6
7	(Dominican Republic) R Cid Subervi	3	4
(India) S Mukund	6	6
(Portugal) G Oliveira	7	7^{8}
WC	(United States) R Harrison	5	6^{6}
Q	(Australia) D Kelly	6	7
Alt	(United States) N Chappell	1	5
WC	(United States) O Crawford	7	6
9	(Canada) P Polansky	5	2

Second round
8	(United States) C Eubanks	4	6^{4}
(United States) U Blanch	6	7^{7}
Q	(Canada) A Galarneau	4	4
3	(Ecuador) E Gómez	6	6
(India) S Mukund	6	4	2
(Portugal) G Oliveira	4	6	6
Q	(Australia) D Kelly	4	1
WC	(United States) O Crawford	6	6

Quarterfinals
(United States) U Blanch	2	0
3	(Ecuador) E Gómez	6	6
(Portugal) G Oliveira	1	7	2
WC	(United States) O Crawford	6	5	0^{r}

Semifinals
3	(Ecuador) E Gómez	6	6
(Portugal) G Oliveira	4	2
