= 2025 Little Rock Challenger =

- Date: May 26 – June 1
- Edition: 6th
- Surface: Hard
- Location: Little Rock, Arkansas, United States

Champions

Singles
- (United States) Patrick Kypson

Doubles
- (Tunisia) Aziz Dougaz / (France) Antoine Escoffier
← 2024 ·	Little Rock Challenger	· 2026 →

The 2025 UAMS Health Little Rock Open was a professional tennis tournament played on hardcourts. It was the sixth edition of the tournament which was part of the 2025 ATP Challenger Tour. It took place in Little Rock, Arkansas, United States from May 26 to June 1, 2025.

== Singles main-draw entrants ==
=== Seeds ===
Country	Player	Rank^{1}	Seed
USA	Mitchell Krueger	141	1
CAN	Liam Draxl	148	2
JPN	Yuta Shimizu	192	3
CAN	Alexis Galarneau	203	4
ARG	Santiago Rodríguez Taverna	209	5
FRA	Antoine Escoffier	218	6
TUN	Aziz Dougaz	222	7
GBR	Paul Jubb	238	8

- ^{1} Rankings are as of May 19, 2025.

=== Other entrants ===
The following players received wildcards into the singles main draw:

- (United States) ~~Darwin Blanch~~
- (United States) Alexander Kotzen
- (United States) Michael Zheng

The following player received entry into the singles main draw using a protected ranking:

- Ilya Ivashka

The following player received entry into the singles main draw through the Junior Accelerator programme:

- (Spain) Rafael Jódar

The following players received entry from the qualifying draw:

- (Argentina) Nicolás Kicker
- (United States) Stefan Kozlov
- (United States) Patrick Kypson
- (United States) Daniel Milavsky
- (Japan) Kenta Miyoshi
- (Colombia) Adrià Soriano Barrera

The following player received entry as a lucky loser:

- (South Korea) Chung Hyeon

== Champions ==
=== Singles ===
- (United States) Patrick Kypson def. (United States) Michael Zheng 6–1, 1–6, 7–5.

=== Doubles ===
- (Tunisia) Aziz Dougaz / (France) Antoine Escoffier def. (Ecuador) Andrés Andrade / (Colombia) Nicolás Mejía 6–2, 6–3.
