= 2023 Little Rock Challenger – Singles =

Singles
- 2023 Little Rock Challenger

Final
- Champion: (Estonia) Mark Lajal
- Runner-up: (Kazakhstan) Beibit Zhukayev
- Score: 6–4, 7–5

Events
| Singles | Doubles |
- Little Rock Challenger

Jason Kubler was the defending champion but chose not to defend his title.

Mark Lajal won the title after defeating Beibit Zhukayev 6–4, 7–5 in the final.

== Seeds ==
1. (Chinese Taipei) Wu Tung-lin (second round)
2. (United States) Nicolas Moreno de Alboran (second round)
3. (Australia) Marc Polmans (first round)
4. (France) Antoine Escoffier (semifinals)
5. (Japan) Yasutaka Uchiyama (first round)
6. (Argentina) Juan Pablo Ficovich (first round)
7. (Tunisia) Aziz Dougaz (quarterfinals)
8. (United States) Tennys Sandgren (second round)

== Draw ==
Key

- Q = Qualifier
- WC = Wild card
- LL = Lucky loser
- Alt = Alternate
- ITF = ITF entry
- PR = Protected ranking
- SR = Special ranking
- SE = Special exempt
- JE = Junior exempt
- JR = Junior Accelerator Programme entrant
- CO = College Accelerator Programme entrant
- NG = Next Gen Accelerator Program entrant
- w/o = Walkover
- r = Retired
- d = Defaulted

=== Finals ===
Semifinals
(Estonia) Mark Lajal | 4 | 6 | 6
4 | (France) Antoine Escoffier | 6 | 3 | 2
Q | (Australia) Adam Walton | 7^{8} | 4 | 6^{4}
Q | (Kazakhstan) Beibit Zhukayev | 6^{6} | 6 | 7^{7}

Final
(Estonia) Mark Lajal | 6 | 7
Q | (Kazakhstan) Beibit Zhukayev | 4 | 5

=== Top half ===
First round
1 | (Chinese Taipei) T-l Wu | 6 | 4 | 6
(United States) B Kuzuhara | 3 | 6 | 4
(United States) M Krueger | 2 | 6^{3}
(Estonia) M Lajal | 6 | 7^{7}
(United States) E Zhu | 6 | 6^{7} | 7^{7}
WC | (United States) T Boyer | 4 | 7^{9} | 6^{2}
(Tunisia) S Mansouri | 5 | 3
7 | (Tunisia) A Dougaz | 7 | 6
4 | (France) A Escoffier | 6 | 6
WC | (United States) A Mayo | 3 | 4
WC | (United States) Nathan Ponwith | 2 | 7 | 7
Q | (United States) Christian Langmo | 6 | 5 | 5
PR | (United States) T-S Kwiatkowski | 6 | 7
(Norway) V Durasovic | 4 | 5
(Germany) D Masur | 6 | 6
5 | (Japan) Y Uchiyama | 2 | 3

Second round
1 | (Chinese Taipei) T-l Wu | 5 | 3
(Estonia) M Lajal | 7 | 6
(United States) E Zhu | 6 | 3 | 1
7 | (Tunisia) A Dougaz | 3 | 6 | 6
4 | (France) A Escoffier | 6 | 6
WC | (United States) N Ponwith | 1 | 2
PR | (United States) T-S Kwiatkowski | 7 | 6
(Germany) D Masur | 5 | 4

Quarterfinals
(Estonia) M Lajal | 7^{7} | 6
7 | (Tunisia) A Dougaz | 6^{5} | 2
4 | (France) A Escoffier | 6 | 3 | 7
PR | (United States) T-S Kwiatkowski | 1 | 6 | 5

Semifinals
(Estonia) M Lajal | 4 | 6 | 6
4 | (France) A Escoffier | 6 | 3 | 2

=== Bottom half ===
First round
6 | (Argentina) JP Ficovich | 6^{2} | 2
(Canada) A Galarneau | 7^{7} | 6
(United States) A Michelsen | 4 | 6 | 7
(Kazakhstan) D Yevseyev | 6 | 3 | 5
Q | (Poland) M Kaśnikowski | 2 | 3
(Brazil) JL Reis da Silva | 6 | 6
Q | (Australia) A Walton | 6 | 5 | 6
3 | (Australia) M Polmans | 4 | 7 | 2
8 | (United States) T Sandgren | 6 | 6
(Japan) Y Shimizu | 1 | 0
(Kazakhstan) M Kukushkin | 7^{7} | 6
Q | (United States) M Zheng | 6^{5} | 3
Q | (Kazakhstan) B Zhukayev | 6 | 6
Q | (Germany) P Gojowczyk | 2 | 2
(Czech Republic) M Gengel | 6 | 3 | 4
2 | (United States) N Moreno de Alboran | 2 | 6 | 6

Second round
(Canada) A Galarneau | 3 | 6 | 6
(United States) A Michelsen | 6 | 3 | 3
(Brazil) JL Reis da Silva | 6 | 6^{2} | 4
Q | (Australia) A Walton | 3 | 7^{7} | 6
8 | (United States) T Sandgren | 2 | 5
(Kazakhstan) M Kukushkin | 6 | 7
Q | (Kazakhstan) B Zhukayev | 6 | 6^{1} | 7^{7}
2 | (United States) N Moreno de Alboran | 2 | 7^{7} | 6^{5}

Quarterfinals
(Canada) A Galarneau | 4 | 1
Q | (Australia) A Walton | 6 | 6
(Kazakhstan) M Kukushkin | 7^{8} | 4 | 5
Q | (Kazakhstan) B Zhukayev | 6^{6} | 6 | 7

Semifinals
Q | (Australia) A Walton | 7^{8} | 4 | 6^{4}
Q | (Kazakhstan) B Zhukayev | 6^{6} | 6 | 7^{7}
