= 2024 Little Rock Challenger =

- Date: May 27 – June 2
- Edition: 5th
- Surface: Hard
- Location: Little Rock, Arkansas, United States

Champions

Singles
- (United States) Mitchell Krueger

Doubles
- (Canada) Liam Draxl / (Canada) Benjamin Sigouin
← 2023 ·	Little Rock Challenger	· 2025 →

The 2024 UAMS Health Little Rock Open was a professional tennis tournament played on hardcourts. It was the fifth edition of the tournament which was part of the 2024 ATP Challenger Tour. It took place in Little Rock, Arkansas, United States from May 27 to June 2, 2024.

== Singles main-draw entrants ==
=== Seeds ===
Country	Player	Rank^{1}	Seed
CAN	Alexis Galarneau	153	1
HKG	Coleman Wong	181	2
KOR	Hong Seong-chan	191	3
TPE	Hsu Yu-hsiou	230	4
AUS	Bernard Tomic	247	5
USA	Mitchell Krueger	250	6
USA	Ethan Quinn	251	7
JOR	Abdullah Shelbayh	252	8

- ^{1} Rankings are as of May 20, 2024.

=== Other entrants ===
The following players received wildcards into the singles main draw:

- (United States) Murphy Cassone
- (India) Mukund Sasikumar
- (United States) Trevor Svajda

The following players received entry from the qualifying draw:

- (Mexico) Ernesto Escobedo
- (United States) Christian Langmo
- (United States) Andres Martin
- (United States) Rudy Quan
- (United States) Keegan Smith
- (Japan) Yusuke Takahashi

== Champions ==
=== Singles ===
- (United States) Mitchell Krueger def. (Japan) Yuta Shimizu 6–3, 6–4.

=== Doubles ===
- (Canada) Liam Draxl / (Canada) Benjamin Sigouin def. (India) Rithvik Choudary Bollipalli / (Mexico) Hans Hach Verdugo 6–4, 3–6, [10–7].
