= 2023 Little Rock Challenger – Doubles =

Doubles
- 2023 Little Rock Challenger

Final
- Champions: (South Korea) Nam Ji-sung (New Zealand) Artem Sitak
- Runners-up: (Canada) Alexis Galarneau (United States) Nicolas Moreno de Alboran
- Score: 6–4, 6–4

Events
Singles	Doubles
- Little Rock Challenger

Andrew Harris and Christian Harrison were the defending champions but only Harris chose to defend his title, partnering Alex Bolt. Harris lost in the first round to Yuta Shimizu and Yasutaka Uchiyama.

Nam Ji-sung and Artem Sitak won the title after defeating Alexis Galarneau and Nicolas Moreno de Alboran 6–4, 6–4 in the final.

== Seeds ==
1. (United States) Evan King / (United States) Reese Stalder (first round)
2. (Philippines) Ruben Gonzales / (Mexico) Hans Hach Verdugo (first round)
3. (United States) Alex Lawson / (Greece) Michail Pervolarakis (semifinals)
4. (Japan) Toshihide Matsui / (Japan) Kaito Uesugi (first round)

== Draw ==
Key

- Q = Qualifier
- WC = Wild card
- LL = Lucky loser
- Alt = Alternate
- ITF = ITF entry
- PR = Protected ranking
- SR = Special ranking
- SE = Special exempt
- JE = Junior exempt
- JR = Junior Accelerator Programme entrant
- CO = College Accelerator Programme entrant
- NG = Next Gen Accelerator Program entrant
- w/o = Walkover
- r = Retired
- d = Defaulted

First round
1	(United States) E King (United States) R Stalder	7^{8}	3	[4]
(Tunisia) S Mansouri (New Zealand) R Statham	6^{6}	6	[10]
(India) A Kadhe (Germany) D Masur	6	6^{3}	[6]
(South Korea) J-s Nam (New Zealand) A Sitak	1	7^{7}	[10]
3	(United States) A Lawson (Greece) M Pervolarakis	6	7
(United Kingdom) G Hussey (Australia) A Walton	4	5
(Australia) A Bolt (Australia) A Harris	4	6	[7]
(Japan) Y Shimizu (Japan) Y Uchiyama	6	4	[10]
(Norway) V Durasovic (Czech Republic) M Gengel	4	4
(Australia) C Puttergill (Canada) K Stevenson	6	6
(Tunisia) A Dougaz (France) A Escoffier	6	6
4	(Japan) T Matsui (Japan) K Uesugi	4	4
WC	(United States) Welsh Hotard (United States) Benjamin Koch	3	1
WC	(United States) R Harrison (United States) V Kirkov	6	6
(Canada) A Galarneau (United States) N Moreno de Alboran	6	6
2	(Philippines) R Gonzales (Mexico) H Hach Verdugo	3	4

Quarterfinals
(Tunisia) S Mansouri (New Zealand) R Statham	4	6^{1}
(South Korea) J-s Nam (New Zealand) A Sitak	6	7^{7}
3	(United States) A Lawson (Greece) M Pervolarakis	6	6
(Japan) Y Shimizu (Japan) Y Uchiyama	4	2
(Australia) C Puttergill (Canada) K Stevenson	6	7^{7}
(Tunisia) A Dougaz (France) A Escoffier	0	6^{5}
WC	(United States) R Harrison (United States) V Kirkov	3	7	[8]
(Canada) A Galarneau (United States) N Moreno de Alboran	6	5	[10]

Semifinals
(South Korea) J-s Nam (New Zealand) A Sitak	7^{7}	6
3	(United States) A Lawson (Greece) M Pervolarakis	6^{5}	2
(Australia) C Puttergill (Canada) K Stevenson	0	3
(Canada) A Galarneau (United States) N Moreno de Alboran	6	6

Final
(South Korea) J-s Nam (New Zealand) A Sitak	6	6
(Canada) A Galarneau (United States) N Moreno de Alboran	4	4
