= Beibit Zhukayev =

Kazakhstani tennis player (born 2000)

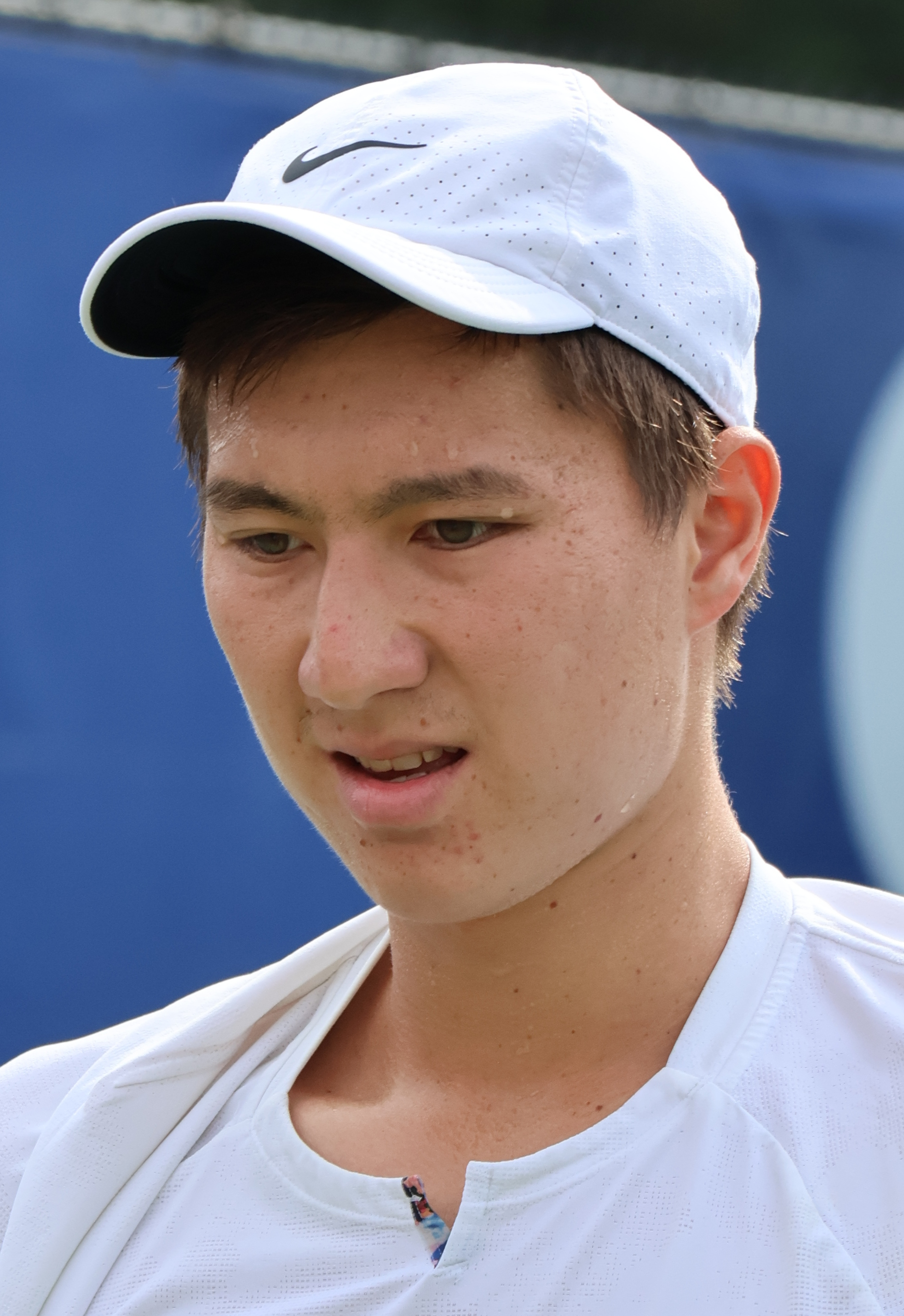
- Zhukayev in 2023
- Country (sports): Kazakhstan
- Born: 12 October 2000 (age 26) Aktau, Kazakhstan
- Height: 1.98 m (6 ft 6 in)
- Plays: Right-handed (two-handed backhand)
- Prize money: $ 680,260

Singles
- Career record: 5–8 (at ATP Tour level, Grand Slam level, and in Davis Cup)
- Career titles: 0
- Highest ranking: No. 171 (20 May 2024)
- Current ranking: No. 283 (17 November 2025)

Grand Slam singles results
- Australian Open: Q2 (2024)
- French Open: Q1 (2024, 2025)
- Wimbledon: 1R (2025)
- US Open: Q2 (2024, 2025)

Doubles
- Career record: 0–2 (at ATP Tour level, Grand Slam level, and in Davis Cup)
- Career titles: 0
- Highest ranking: No. 327 (3 October 2022)
- Current ranking: No. 362 (3 November 2025)
- Last updated on: 18 November 2025.

Beibit Zhukayev (born 12 October 2000) is a Kazakh tennis player. He has a career high ATP singles ranking of world No. 171 achieved on 20 May 2024 and a doubles ranking of No. 327 achieved on 3 October 2022. He is the current No. 4 Kazakh player.

== Career ==
=== 2022-2023: ATP and Masters debuts ===
Zhukayev made his ATP main draw debut at the 2022 Astana Open after receiving a wildcard for the singles and doubles main draws. He was then defeated by Botic van de Zandschulp in the first round.

Ranked No. 302, he made his debut in qualifying at a Masters 1000 level at the 2023 Rolex Shanghai Masters. He qualified for the main draw and won his first round match over qualifier Stefano Napolitano on his debut. He lost to 13th seed Karen Khachanov. Following a quarterfinal showing at the 2023 Shenzhen Longhua Open he returned to the top 250 on 16 October 2023.

=== 2024-2025: Top 175 and Grand Slam debuts ===
He reached the top 175 in the rankings on 6 May 2024 following three quarterfinals showings at two Challengers in Mexico and one in China in April.

He made his major debut after qualifying for the main draw at the 2025 Wimbledon Championships.

== Performance timeline ==
Key
| W | F | SF | QF | #R | RR | Q# | DNQ | A | NH |

(W) winner; (F) finalist; (SF) semifinalist; (QF) quarterfinalist; (#R) rounds 4, 3, 2, 1; (RR) round-robin stage; (Q#) qualification round; (DNQ) did not qualify; (A) absent; (NH) not held; (SR) strike rate (events won / competed); (W–L) win–loss record.

=== Singles ===
| Tournament | 2023 | 2024 | 2025 | SR | W–L | Win% |
|---|---|---|---|---|---|---|
Grand Slam tournaments
| Australian Open | A | Q2 | A | 0 / 0 | 0–0 | – |
| French Open | A | Q1 | Q1 | 0 / 0 | 0–0 | – |
| Wimbledon | A | Q3 | 1R | 0 / 1 | 0–1 | 0% |
| US Open | A | Q2 | Q2 | 0 / 0 | 0–0 | – |
| Win–loss | 0–0 | 0–0 | 0–1 | 0 / 1 | 0–1 | 0% |
ATP Masters 1000
| Indian Wells Masters | A | Q1 | A | 0 / 0 | 0–0 | – |
| Miami Open | A | A | A | 0 / 0 | 0–0 | – |
| Monte Carlo Masters | A | A | A | 0 / 0 | 0–0 | – |
| Madrid Open | A | A | A | 0 / 0 | 0-0 | – |
| Italian Open | A | A | A | 0 / 0 | 0–0 | – |
| Canadian Open | A | A | A | 0 / 0 | 0–0 | – |
| Cincinnati Masters | A | A | A | 0 / 0 | 0–0 | – |
| Shanghai Masters | 2R | 1R | Q2 | 0 / 2 | 1–2 | 33% |
| Paris Masters | A | A | A | 0 / 0 | 0–0 | – |
| Win–loss | 1–1 | 0–1 | 0–0 | 0 / 2 | 1–2 | 33% |

== ATP Challenger Tour finals ==
=== Singles: 2 (1 title, 1 runner-up) ===
| Legend ATP Challenger Tour (1–1) |

| Result | W–L | Date | Tournament | Tier | Surface | Opponent | Score |
|---|---|---|---|---|---|---|---|
| Loss | 0–1 | Jun 2023 | Little Rock, USA | Challenger | Hard | (Estonia) Mark Lajal | 4–6, 5–7 |
| Win | 1–1 | Oct 2023 | Charlottesville, USA | Challenger | Hard (i) | (United States) Aidan Mayo | 6–3, 6–4 |

== ITF World Tennis Tour finals ==
=== Singles: 5 (5 runner-ups) ===
| Legend ITF WTT (0–5) | Finals by surface Hard (0–4) Clay (0–0) Grass (0–0) Carpet (0–1) |

| Result | W–L | Date | Tournament | Tier | Surface | Opponent | Score |
|---|---|---|---|---|---|---|---|
| Loss | 0–1 | Sep 2019 | M25 Almaty, Kazakhstan | WTT | Hard | (Uzbekistan) Jurabek Karimov | 5–7, 3–6 |
| Loss | 0–2 | Oct 2019 | M15 Qarshi, Uzbekistan | WTT | Hard | (Uzbekistan) Khumoyun Sultanov | 2–6, 1–6 |
| Loss | 0–3 | Mar 2022 | M25 Nur-Sultan, Kazakhstan | WTT | Hard (i) | (Russia) Alibek Kachmazov | 3–6, 7–6^{(7–5)}, 6–7^{(4–7)} |
| Loss | 0–4 | Jul 2022 | M25 Nur-Sultan, Kazakhstan | WTT | Hard | (Uzbekistan) Sergey Fomin | 4–6, 6–2, 4–6 |
| Loss | 0–5 | Mar 2023 | M25 Trimbach, Switzerland | WTT | Carpet (i) | (Poland) Kacper Żuk | 4–6, 4–6 |
