= 2021 Little Rock Challenger – Doubles =

Doubles
- 2021 Little Rock Challenger

Final
- Champions: (Colombia) Nicolás Barrientos (United States) Ernesto Escobedo
- Runners-up: (United States) Christopher Eubanks (Ecuador) Roberto Quiroz
- Score: 4–6, 6–3, [10–5]

Events
Singles	Doubles
- Little Rock Challenger

Matías Franco Descotte and Orlando Luz were the defending champions but chose not to defend their title.

Nicolás Barrientos and Ernesto Escobedo won the title after defeating Christopher Eubanks and Roberto Quiroz 4–6, 6–3, [10–5] in the final.

== Seeds ==
1. (United States) Robert Galloway / (United States) Alex Lawson (withdrew)
2. (United States) Dennis Novikov / (Portugal) Gonçalo Oliveira (semifinals)
3. (India) Jeevan Nedunchezhiyan / (India) Purav Raja (first round)
4. (Croatia) Ante Pavić / (South Africa) Ruan Roelofse (first round, retired)

== Draw ==
Key

- Q = Qualifier
- WC = Wild card
- LL = Lucky loser
- Alt = Alternate
- ITF = ITF entry
- PR = Protected ranking
- SR = Special ranking
- SE = Special exempt
- JE = Junior exempt
- JR = Junior Accelerator Programme entrant
- CO = College Accelerator Programme entrant
- NG = Next Gen Accelerator Program entrant
- w/o = Walkover
- r = Retired
- d = Defaulted

First round
Alt	(India) S Mukund (Greece) M Pervolarakis	6	7^{7}
(Philippines) R Gonzales (United States) Ma Redlicki	2	6^{3}
(United States) S Bangoura (United States) D Young	6^{4}	6	[10]
(Mexico) H Hach Verdugo (Chinese Taipei) J Jung	7^{7}	2	[4]
4	(Croatia) A Pavić (South Africa) R Roelofse	4	0^{r}
(Colombia) N Barrientos (United States) E Escobedo	6	0
(United States) M Krueger (United States) J Sock	7^{7}	6
WC	(United States) S Kirchheimer (United States) P Kypson	6^{4}	2
(United States) C Harrison (Canada) P Polansky	4	7	[10]
(United States) JC Aragone (Ecuador) E Gómez	6	5	[6]
(United States) C Eubanks (Ecuador) R Quiroz	7^{7}	6
3	(India) J Nedunchezhiyan (India) P Raja	6^{5}	2
WC	(Dominican Republic) R Cid Subervi (United States) H Johnson	6	2	[7]
WC	(United States) Jackson Allen (United States) Maks Silagy	4	6	[10]
Alt	(Australia) T Schoolkate (Australia) D Sweeny	4	5
2	(United States) D Novikov (Portugal) G Oliveira	6	7

Quarterfinals
Alt	(India) S Mukund (Greece) M Pervolarakis	7^{7}	1	[10]
(United States) S Bangoura (United States) D Young	6^{5}	6	[7]
(Colombia) N Barrientos (United States) E Escobedo	w/o
(United States) M Krueger (United States) J Sock
(United States) C Harrison (Canada) P Polansky	3	4
(United States) C Eubanks (Ecuador) R Quiroz	6	6
WC	(United States) J Allen (United States) M Silagy	2	3
2	(United States) D Novikov (Portugal) G Oliveira	6	6

Semifinals
Alt	(India) S Mukund (Greece) M Pervolarakis	5	3
(Colombia) N Barrientos (United States) E Escobedo	7	6
(United States) C Eubanks (Ecuador) R Quiroz	6	6
2	(United States) D Novikov (Portugal) G Oliveira	3	3

Final
(Colombia) N Barrientos (United States) E Escobedo	4	6	[10]
(United States) C Eubanks (Ecuador) R Quiroz	6	3	[5]
