= 2021 Little Rock Challenger =

- Date: 31 May – 6 June
- Edition: 2nd
- Surface: Hard
- Location: Little Rock, Arkansas, United States

Champions

Singles
- (United States) Jack Sock

Doubles
- (Colombia) Nicolás Barrientos / (United States) Ernesto Escobedo
- Little Rock Challenger

The 2021 Little Rock Challenger was a professional tennis tournament played on hard courts. It was the second edition of the tournament which was part of the 2021 ATP Challenger Tour. It took place in Little Rock, Arkansas, United States from May 31 to June 6, 2021.

== Singles main-draw entrants ==
=== Seeds ===
Country	Player	Rank^{1}	Seed
TPE	Jason Jung	160	1
~~USA~~	~~Michael Mmoh~~	~~169~~	~~2~~
ECU	Emilio Gómez	179	3
USA	Ernesto Escobedo	187	4
USA	Mitchell Krueger	206	5
USA	Thai-Son Kwiatkowski	218	6
DOM	Roberto Cid Subervi	237	7
USA	Christopher Eubanks	240	8
CAN	Peter Polansky	242	9

- ^{1} Rankings are as of 24 May 2021.

=== Other entrants ===
The following players received wildcards into the singles main draw:

- (United States) Oliver Crawford
- (United States) Ryan Harrison
- (United States) Zane Khan

The following player received entry into the singles main draw as an alternate:

- (United States) Nick Chappell

The following players received entry from the qualifying draw:

- (Canada) Alexis Galarneau
- (Australia) Dayne Kelly
- (United States) Stefan Kozlov
- (United States) Zachary Svajda

== Champions ==
=== Singles ===
- (United States) Jack Sock def. (Ecuador) Emilio Gómez 7–5, 6–4.

=== Doubles ===
- (Colombia) Nicolás Barrientos / (United States) Ernesto Escobedo def. (United States) Christopher Eubanks / (Ecuador) Roberto Quiroz 4–6, 6–3, [10–5].
