= 2026 Little Rock Challenger =

- Date: May 25 – 31
- Edition: 7th
- Surface: Hard
- Location: Little Rock, Arkansas, United States

Champions

Singles
- (United States) Colton Smith

Doubles
- (United States) Pranav Kumar / (United States) Karl Poling
- Little Rock Challenger

The 2026 UAMS Health Little Rock Open was a professional tennis tournament played on hardcourts. It was the seventh edition of the tournament which was part of the 2026 ATP Challenger Tour. It took place in Little Rock, Arkansas, United States from May 25 to 31, 2026.

== Singles main-draw entrants ==
=== Seeds ===
Country	Player	Rank^{1}	Seed
AUS	Dane Sweeny	131	1
COL	Nicolás Mejía	171	2
USA	Colton Smith	186	3
AUS	Bernard Tomic	195	4
USA	Michael Mmoh	218	5
LTU	Edas Butvilas	253	6
USA	Murphy Cassone	262	7
CHN	Sun Fajing	263	8

- ^{1} Rankings are as of May 18, 2026.

=== Other entrants ===
The following players received wildcards into the singles main draw:

- (United States) Dakotah Bobo
- (United States) Daniel Milavsky
- (United States) Braden Shick

The following players received entry into the singles main draw using protected rankings:

- (Australia) Blake Ellis
- (United States) Aidan Mayo

The following player received entry into the singles main draw through the College Accelerator programme:

- (France) Timo Legout

The following player received entry into the singles main draw through the Next Gen Accelerator programme:

- (United States) Trevor Svajda

The following players received entry from the qualifying draw:

- (Australia) Enzo Aguiard
- Erik Arutiunian
- (Canada) Justin Boulais
- (United States) Ronald Hohmann
- (United Kingdom) Johannus Monday
- (United Kingdom) Henry Searle

The following players received entry as lucky losers:

- (Japan) Jay Friend
- (Japan) Hiroki Moriya

== Champions ==
=== Singles ===
- (United States) Colton Smith def. (United States) Michael Mmoh 6–2, 6–4.

=== Doubles ===
- (United States) Pranav Kumar / (United States) Karl Poling def. (Australia) Eric Padgham / (Czech Republic) Jakub Vrba 6–4, 6–1.
