= Karl Poling =

American tennis player (born 1999)

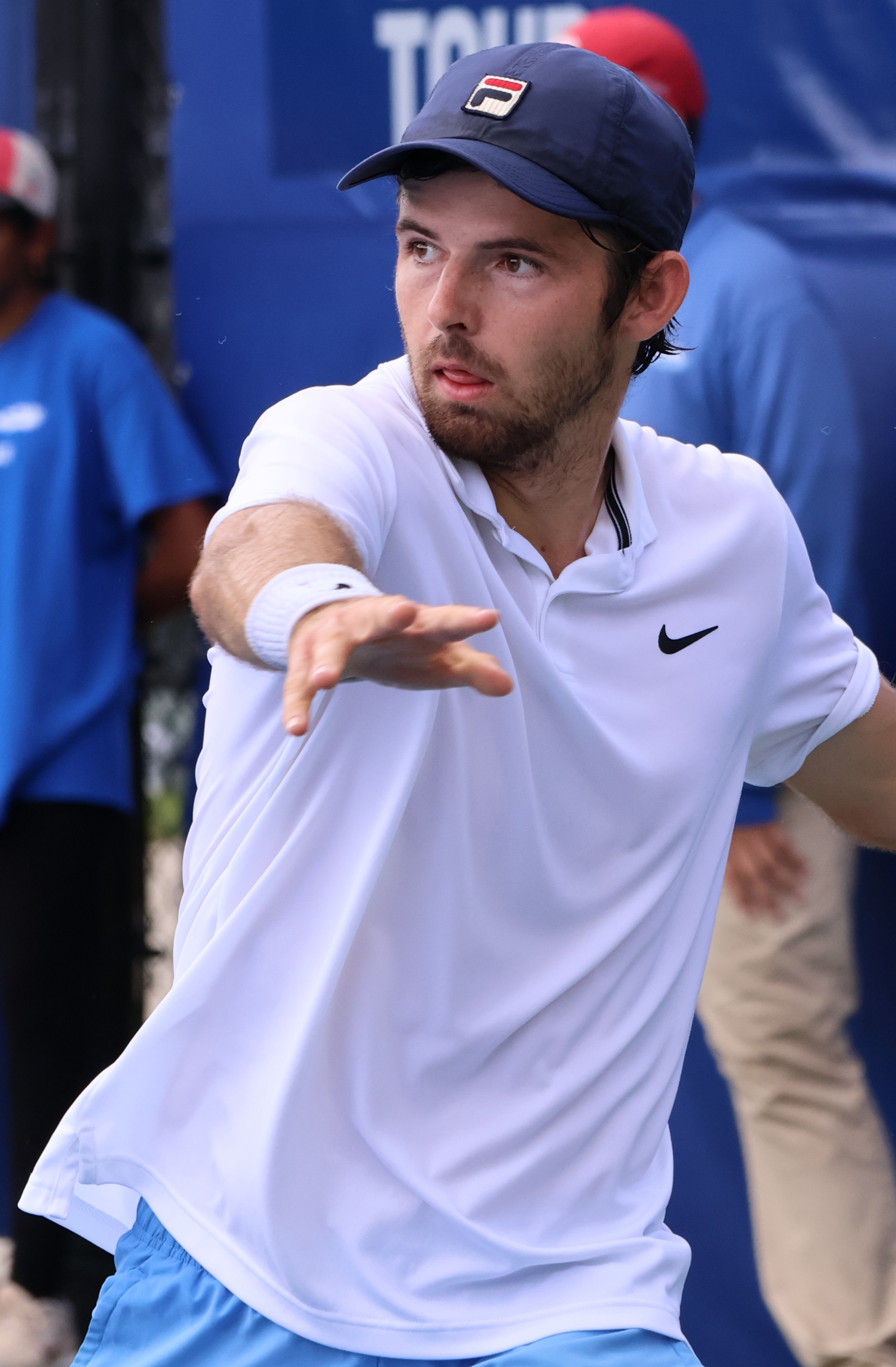
- Poling in 2023
- Country (sports): United States
- Born: August 4, 1999 (age 27) Concord, United States
- Height: 6 ft 1 in (1.85 m)
- Plays: Left-handed
- College: Princeton; North Carolina
- Coach: Asher Salam
- Prize money: US $100,996

Singles
- Career record: 0–0 (at ATP Tour level, Grand Slam level, and in Davis Cup)
- Career titles: 0
- Highest ranking: No. 446 (November 9, 2026)
- Current ranking: No. 446 (November 9, 2026)

Doubles
- Career record: 0–0 (at ATP Tour level, Grand Slam level, and in Davis Cup)
- Career titles: 2 Challenger, 3 ITF
- Highest ranking: No. 140 (October 26, 2026)
- Current ranking: No. 145 (November 9, 2026)
- Last updated on: November 9, 2026.

Karl Poling (born August 4, 1999) is an American tennis player. Poling has a career high ATP doubles ranking of No. 140 achieved on October 26, 2026 and a singles ranking of No. 446 achieved on November 9, 2026.

Poling played college tennis at Princeton before transferring to North Carolina. His father, Jim, was a college tennis coach for over 20 years.

== Career ==
Poling has won two ATP Challenger doubles titles at the 2026 Metepec Open and at the 2026 Little Rock Open with Pranav Kumar.
