= Pranav Kumar =

American tennis player (born 1999)

- Country (sports): United States
- Born: August 31, 1999 (age 26) Franklin, Massachusetts, United States
- Height: 1.75 m (5 ft 9 in)
- Plays: Right-handed
- College: Texas A&M; SMU
- Prize money: US $45,700

Singles
- Career record: 0–0 (at ATP Tour level, Grand Slam level, and in Davis Cup)
- Career titles: 0
- Highest ranking: No. 1,149 (August 25, 2025)
- Current ranking: No. 1,780 (June 15, 2026)

Doubles
- Career record: 0–1 (at ATP Tour level, Grand Slam level, and in Davis Cup)
- Career titles: 2 Challenger, 5 ITF
- Highest ranking: No. 205 (June 15, 2026)
- Current ranking: No. 205 (June 15, 2026)
- Last updated on: June 15, 2026.

Pranav Kumar (born August 31, 1999) is an American tennis player. Kumar has a career high ATP doubles ranking of No. 205 achieved on June 15, 2026 and a singles ranking of No. 1,149 achieved on 25 August 2025.

Kumar played college tennis at Texas A&M before transferring to SMU.

== Career ==
Kumar made his ATP main draw debut at the 2023 Dallas Open after receiving a wildcard for the doubles main draw. He has won two ATP Challenger doubles titles at the 2026 Metepec Open and at the 2026 Little Rock Open with Karl Poling.

== Personal life ==
Kumar is of Indian descent, both his parents were born in Madurai.
