= Roberto Quiroz =

Ecuadorian tennis player (born 1992)

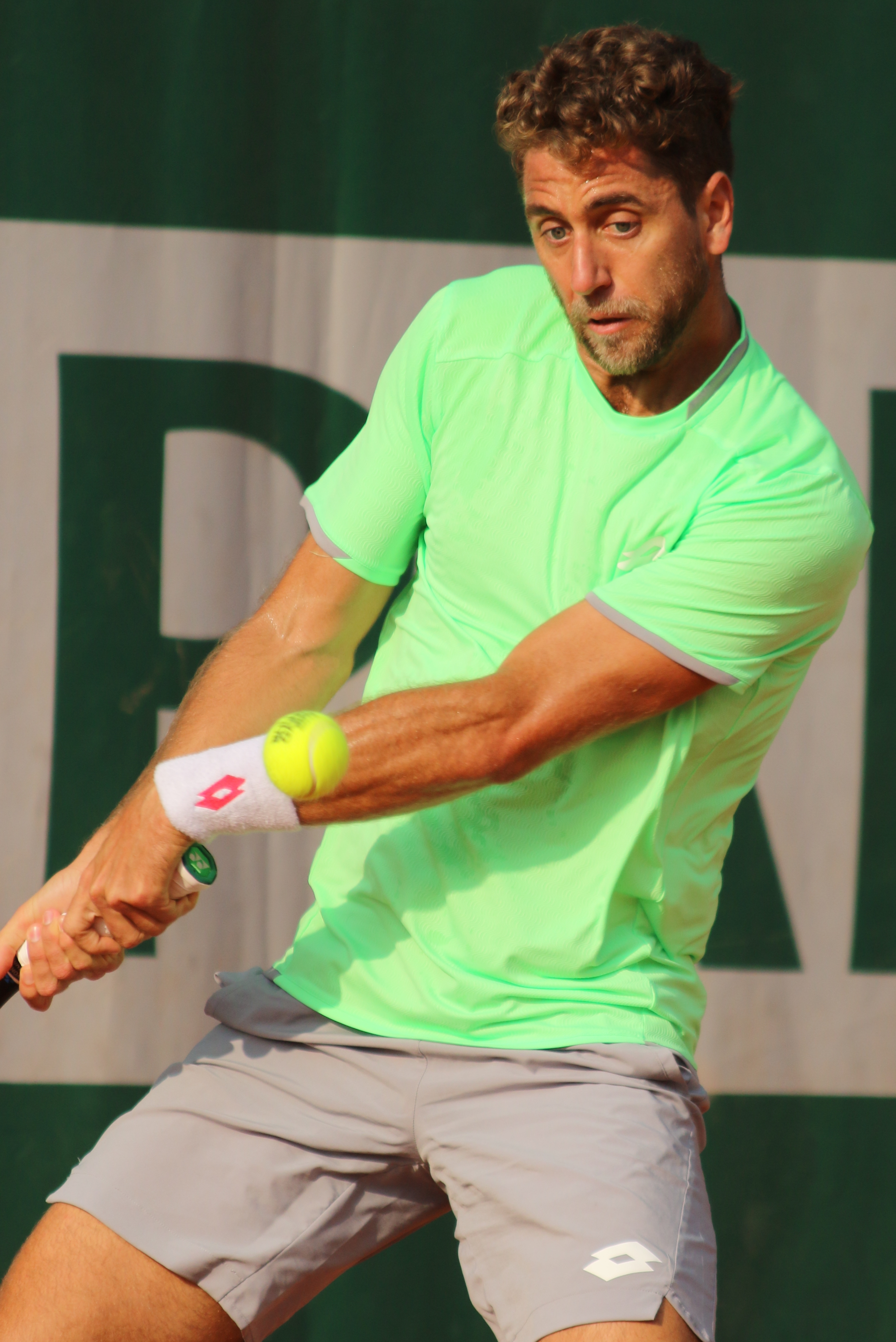
- Quiroz at the 2019 French Open
- Country (sports): Ecuador
- Residence: Guayaquil, Ecuador
- Born: 23 February 1992 (age 34) Guayaquil, Ecuador
- Height: 193 cm (6 ft 4 in)
- Turned pro: 2014
- Retired: 2022
- Plays: Left-handed (two-handed backhand)
- College: University of Southern California
- Prize money: $398,482

Singles
- Career record: 10–12
- Career titles: 0
- Highest ranking: No. 172 (18 March 2019)

Grand Slam singles results
- French Open: Q3 (2017)
- Wimbledon: Q2 (2017, 2019)
- US Open: Q1 (2017, 2018, 2019)

Doubles
- Career record: 2–12
- Career titles: 0
- Highest ranking: No. 159 (24 December 2018)
Medal record
Representing Ecuador
Pan American Games
Gold medal – first place	2019 Lima	Men's doubles

Roberto Quiroz Gómez (Latin American Spanish: [roˈβeɾto kiˈɾos]; born 23 February 1992) is an Ecuadorian former professional tennis player. He has career-high rankings of world No. 172 in singles and No. 159 in doubles. He attended and played collegiate tennis at the University of Southern California.

== Personal life ==
Quiroz is the nephew of Andrés Gómez and the cousin of Emilio Gómez and Nicolás Lapentti.

== Career ==
In 2010 he won the finals stage of Boys' Doubles events on the French Open and US Open with Peruvian tennis player Duilio Beretta. They defeated Argentinian pair Facundo Argüello and Agustín Velotti 6–3, 6–2 in France and they won against Oliver Golding and Jiří Veselý 6–1, 7–5 in the United States.

== Challenger and Futures finals ==
=== Singles: 12 (6–6) ===
Legend (singles) ATP Challenger Tour (1–2) ITF Futures Tour (5–4)	Titles by surface Hard (4–2) Clay (2–4) Grass (0–0) Carpet (0–0)

Result	W–L	Date	Tournament	Tier	Surface	Opponent	Score
Win	1–0	Jul 2014	Venezuela F3, Maracaibo	Futures	Hard	(Peru) Jorge Brian Panta	6–3, 6–4
Loss	1–1	Aug 2014	Ecuador F1, Guayaquil	Futures	Clay	(Ecuador) Gonzalo Escobar	2–6, 2–6
Loss	1–2	May 2016	USA F16, Tampa	Futures	Clay	(Canada) Peter Polansky	5–7, 3–6
Win	2–2	May 2016	Mexico F4, Morelia	Futures	Hard	(Guatemala) Christopher Díaz Figueroa	7–5, 7–5
Win	3–2	Jun 2016	Colombia F3, Cali	Futures	Clay	(Argentina) Gonzalo Villanueva	6–3, 6–1
Win	4–2	Aug 2016	USA F26, Decatur	Futures	Hard	(Australia) Marc Polmans	6–0, 3–6, 7–6^{(8–6)}
Loss	4–3	Oct 2016	Ecuador F3, Salinas	Futures	Clay	(Argentina) Franco Agamenone	2–6, 7–6^{(7–3)}, 0–6
Loss	4–4	Apr 2017	León, Mexico	Challenger	Hard	(Spain) Adrián Menéndez Maceiras	4–6, 6–3, 3–6
Win	5–4	Dec 2017	Dominican Republic F1, Santo Domingo Este	Futures	Hard	(Dominican Republic) Roberto Cid Subervi	6–4, 6–4
Loss	5–5	Apr 2018	Mexico City, Mexico	Challenger	Clay	(Argentina) Juan Ignacio Londero	1–6, 3–6
Loss	5–6	Nov 2020	United States M15, Fayetteville	World Tennis Tour	Hard	(Canada) Alexis Galarneau	2–6, 1–6

=== Doubles: 32 (20–12) ===
Legend (doubles) ATP Challenger Tour (4–11) ITF Futures Tour (16–1)	Titles by surface Hard (12–6) Clay (8–6) Grass (0–0) Carpet (0–0)

Result	W–L	Date	Tournament	Tier	Surface	Partner	Opponents	Score
Win	1–0	Oct 2009	Brazil F22, Bauru	Futures	Clay	(Ecuador) Emilio Gómez	(Argentina) Juan-Pablo Amado (Brazil) André Miele	6–4, 0–6, [10–8]
Win	2–0	Sep 2010	Ecuador F2, Guayaquil	Futures	Hard	(Peru) Duilio Beretta	(United States) Peter Aarts (United States) Christopher Racz	6–4, 6–4
Win	3–0	Apr 2011	Chile F3, Santiago	Futures	Clay	(Peru) Duilio Beretta	(Venezuela) Luis David Martínez (Mexico) Miguel Ángel Reyes-Varela	6–4, 7–5
Loss	3–1	Jul 2011	Venezuela F6, Caracas	Futures	Hard	(Australia) John Peers	(Venezuela) Piero Luisi (Venezuela) Roberto Maytín	4–6, 4–6
Win	4–1	Aug 2011	Ecuador F4, Guayaquil	Futures	Hard	(Ecuador) Iván Endara	(Ecuador) Julio César Campozano (Ecuador) Emilio Gómez	7–6^{(7–4)}, 2–6, [10–7]
Win	5–1	Nov 2011	Guayaquil, Ecuador	Challenger	Clay	(Ecuador) Julio César Campozano	(Uruguay) Marcel Felder (Brazil) Rodrigo-Antonio Grilli	6–4, 6–1
Win	6–1	Aug 2012	Ecuador F1, Guayaquil	Futures	Hard	(Ecuador) Emilio Gómez	(Mexico) Miguel Gallardo Valles (Venezuela) Luis David Martínez	6–4, 7–6^{(7–4)}
Win	7–1	Aug 2012	Ecuador F2, Guayaquil	Futures	Hard	(Ecuador) Emilio Gómez	(Peru) Sergio Galdós (Dominican Republic) José Hernández-Fernández	7–5, 6–2
Win	8–1	Aug 2013	Ecuador F1, Guayaquil	Futures	Hard	(Peru) Duilio Beretta	(Argentina) Sebastián Exequiel Pini (Peru) Rodrigo Sánchez	6–1, 6–3
Win	9–1	Aug 2013	Ecuador F2, Guayaquil	Futures	Hard	(Ecuador) Emilio Gómez	(Peru) Nicolás Álvarez (Peru) Duilio Beretta	6–1, 6–4
Win	10–1	Jul 2014	Venezuela F3, Maracaibo	Futures	Hard	(Argentina) Mateo Nicolás Martínez	(Guatemala) Christopher Díaz Figueroa (Peru) Mauricio Echazú	6–4, 1–1 ret.
Win	11–1	Aug 2014	Ecuador F2, Guayaquil	Futures	Hard	(Ecuador) Diego Hidalgo	(Argentina) Gabriel Alejandro Hidalgo (Brazil) Caio Silva	7–5, 6–7^{(2–7)}, [10–8]
Win	12–1	Mar 2016	USA F9, Boca Raton	Futures	Hard	(Colombia) Alejandro Gómez	(Colombia) José Daniel Bendeck (Colombia) Nicolás Mejía	6–3, 7–6^{(7–2)}
Win	13–1	May 2016	USA F16, Tampa	Futures	Clay	(Ecuador) Gonzalo Escobar	(Serbia) Miomir Kecmanović (Germany) Jonas Lütjen	6–4, 7–6^{(7–4)}
Win	14–1	May 2016	Mexico F3, Mexico City	Futures	Hard	(Ecuador) Iván Endara	(Mexico) Hans Hach (Mexico) Luis Patiño	w/o
Win	15–1	Jun 2016	Colombia F2, Barranquilla	Futures	Clay	(Mexico) Luis Patiño	(Guatemala) Christopher Díaz Figueroa (Guatemala) Wilfredo González	6–4, 7–6^{(9–7)}
Win	16–1	Jun 2016	Colombia F3, Cali	Futures	Clay	(Mexico) Luis Patiño	(Colombia) Juan Sebastián Gómez (Colombia) Cristian Rodríguez	6–1, 3–6, [10–7]
Loss	16–2	Sep 2016	Barranquilla, Colombia	Challenger	Clay	(Ecuador) Gonzalo Escobar	(Colombia) Alejandro Falla (Colombia) Eduardo Struvay	4–6, 5–7
Win	17–2	Jan 2017	USA F1, Los Angeles	Futures	Hard	(Germany) Yannick Hanfmann	(United Kingdom) Luke Bambridge (United Kingdom) Joe Salisbury	3–6, 6–4, [10–8]
Win	18–2	Apr 2017	San Luis Potosí, Mexico	Challenger	Clay	(Brazil) Caio Zampieri	(Mexico) Hans Hach (Spain) Adrián Menéndez Maceiras	6–4, 6–2
Loss	18–3	Jul 2017	Medellín, Colombia	Challenger	Clay	(Chile) Nicolás Jarry	(Barbados) Darian King (Mexico) Miguel Ángel Reyes-Varela	4–6, 4–6
Loss	18–4	Sep 2017	Quito, Ecuador	Challenger	Clay	(Chile) Nicolás Jarry	(El Salvador) Marcelo Arévalo (Mexico) Miguel Ángel Reyes-Varela	6–4, 4–6, [7–10]
Loss	18–5	Apr 2018	Panama City, Panama	Challenger	Hard	(United States) Nathan Pasha	(Germany) Yannick Hanfmann (Germany) Kevin Krawietz	6–7^{(4–7)}, 4–6
Loss	18–6	Sep 2018	Columbus, USA	Challenger	Hard (i)	(Ecuador) Gonzalo Escobar	(Canada) Peter Polansky (United States) Tommy Paul	3–6, 3–6
Loss	18–7	Oct 2018	Santo Domingo, Dominican Republic	Challenger	Clay	(Uruguay) Ariel Behar	(India) Leander Paes (Mexico) Miguel Ángel Reyes-Varela	6–4, 3–6, [5–10]
Win	19–7	Nov 2018	Guayaquil, Ecuador	Challenger	Clay	(Argentina) Guillermo Durán	(Brazil) Thiago Monteiro (Brazil) Fabrício Neis	6–3, 6–2
Loss	19–8	Apr 2019	San Luis Potosí, Mexico	Challenger	Clay	(Uruguay) Ariel Behar	(El Salvador) Marcelo Arévalo (Mexico) Miguel Ángel Reyes-Varela	6–1, 4–6, [10–12]
Win	20–8	Mar 2021	Saint Petersburg, Russia	Challenger	Hard (i)	(United States) Christopher Eubanks	(Netherlands) Jesper de Jong (Netherlands) Sem Verbeek	6–4, 6–3
Loss	20–9	May 2021	Oeiras, Portugal	Challenger	Clay	(Germany) Julian Lenz	(Netherlands) Jesper de Jong (Netherlands) Tim van Rijthoven	1–6, 6–7^{(3–7)}
Loss	20–10	June 2021	Little Rock, USA	Challenger	Hard	(United States) Christopher Eubanks	(Colombia) Nicolás Barrientos (United States) Ernesto Escobedo	6–4, 3–6, [5–10]
Win	21–10	Oct 2021	Bogotá, Colombia	Challenger	Clay	(Chile) Nicolás Jarry	(Colombia) Nicolás Barrientos (Colombia) Alejandro Gómez	6–7^{(4–7)}, 7–5, [10–4]
Loss	21–11	Apr 2022	Salinas, Ecuador	Challenger	Hard	(United States) JC Aragone	(India) Yuki Bhambri (India) Saketh Myneni	6–4, 3–6, [7–10]
Loss	21–12	Apr 2022	Cuernavaca, Mexico	Challenger	Hard	(Colombia) Nicolás Mejía	(United States) JC Aragone (Spain) Adrián Menéndez Maceiras	6–7^{(4–7)}, 2–6

== Junior Grand Slam finals ==
=== Doubles: 2 (2 titles) ===
Result	Year	Tournament	Surface	Partner	Opponents	Score
Win	2010	French Open	Clay	(Peru) Duilio Beretta	(Argentina) Facundo Argüello (Argentina) Agustín Velotti	6–3, 6–2
Win	2010	US Open	Hard	(Peru) Duilio Beretta	(United Kingdom) Oliver Golding (Czech Republic) Jiří Veselý	6–1, 7–5
