= Wu Tung-lin =

Taiwanese tennis player (born 1998)

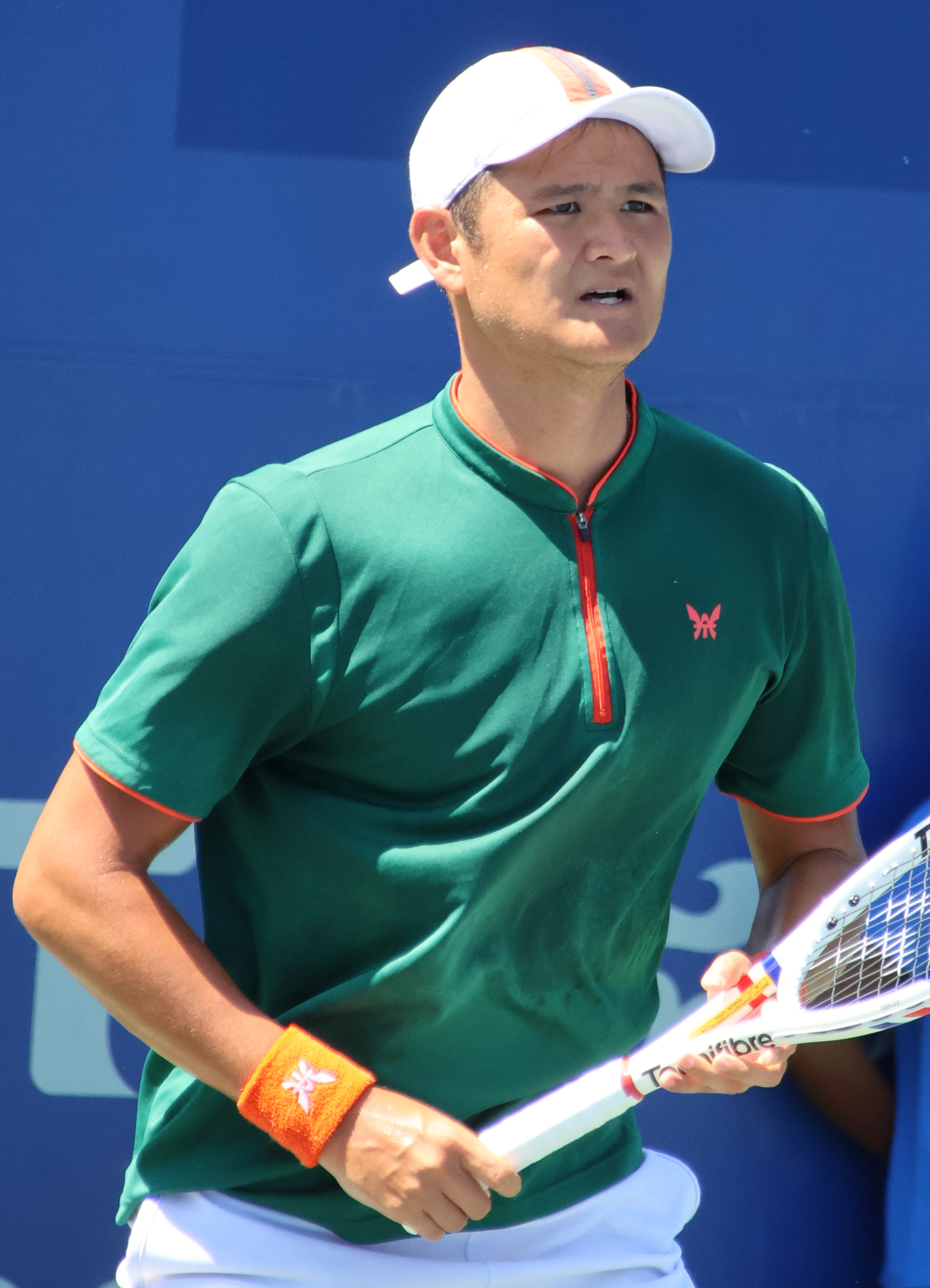
- Wu in 2026
- Country (sports): Taiwan
- Born: 12 May 1998 (age 28) Taichung, Taiwan
- Height: 1.88 m (6 ft 2 in)
- Turned pro: 2016
- Plays: Right-handed (two-handed backhand)
- Coach: Tsai Chia Yen, Ezra Stump
- Prize money: US $688,887

Singles
- Career record: 11–12
- Career titles: 0
- Highest ranking: No. 158 (3 April 2023)
- Current ranking: No. 350 (14 September 2026)

Grand Slam singles results
- Australian Open: Q3 (2021)
- French Open: Q1 (2022, 2023)
- Wimbledon: Q2 (2023)
- US Open: Q1 (2022, 2023)

Doubles
- Career record: 1–1
- Career titles: 0
- Highest ranking: No. 246 (17 October 2022)
- Current ranking: No. 773 (14 September 2026)
Medal record
Men's Tennis
Representing Chinese Taipei
Summer Universiade
Bronze medal – third place	2019 Naples	Men's Team
- Last updated on: 16 September 2026.

Wu Tung-lin (Chinese: 吳東霖; pinyin: Wú Dong-lín; born 12 May 1998), also known as Tony Wu, is a Taiwanese tennis player. He has a career-high ATP singles ranking of World No. 158, achieved on 3 April 2023 and a career-high doubles ranking of No. 246, achieved on 17 October 2022. Wu is currently the No. 3 Taiwanese singles player.

Wu represents Chinese Taipei at the Davis Cup, where he has a W-L record of 1–1.

== Career ==
=== 2022: Maiden Challenger title, top 200 debut ===
In April 2022, Wu won his first ATP Challenger title in Tallahassee, Florida, United States, defeating Michael Mmoh, becoming the fifth Taiwanese player to win a Challenger title.

Following his second final at the 2022 Little Rock Challenger in May, he reached the top 200 at world No. 196 on 13 June 2022.

=== 2023: Masters 1000 debut and first win, top 160 ===
He made his Masters 1000 debut in Indian Wells as a qualifier and won his first match at this level by defeating Alexander Bublik. He reached world No. 158 on 3 April 2023.

== Performance timelines ==
Key
W	F	SF	QF	#R	RR	Q#	DNQ	A	NH

(W) winner; (F) finalist; (SF) semifinalist; (QF) quarterfinalist; (#R) rounds 4, 3, 2, 1; (RR) round-robin stage; (Q#) qualification round; (DNQ) did not qualify; (A) absent; (NH) not held; (SR) strike rate (events won / competed); (W–L) win–loss record.
To avoid confusion and double counting, these charts are updated at the conclusion of a tournament or when the player's participation has ended.

=== Singles ===
Current through the 2023 US Open

Tournament	2021	2022	2023	2024	2025	2026	SR	W–L	Win %
Australian Open	Q3	A	Q1	Q1	A		0 / 0	0–0	–
French Open	A	Q1	Q1	A			0 / 0	0–0	–
Wimbledon	A	A	Q2	A			0 / 0	0–0	–
US Open	A	Q1	Q1	A			0 / 0	0–0	–
Win–loss	0–0	0–0	0–0	0–0			0 / 0	0–0	–
ATP Tour Masters 1000
Indian Wells Masters		A	2R				0 / 1	1–1	50%
Miami Open			Q1				0 / 0	0–0	–
Madrid Open			A				0 / 0	0–0	–
Cincinnati Masters			A				0 / 0	0–0	–
Shanghai Masters	NH		Q2	Q1			0 / 0	0–0	–

== ATP Challengers and ITF Futures/World Tennis Tour finals ==
=== Singles: 14 (4–10) ===
Legend ATP Challengers (2–7) ITF Futures/World Tennis Tour (2–3)	Finals by surface Hard (3–8) Clay (1–2) Grass (0–0) Carpet (0–0)

Result	W–L	Date	Tournament	Tier	Surface	Opponent	Score
Loss	0–1	Jul 2017	China F12, Shenzhen	Futures	Hard	(China) Wang Chuhan	4–6, 6–7^{(5–7)}
Loss	0–2	Oct 2017	Thailand F9, Pattaya	Futures	Hard(i)	(Australia) Max Purcell	2–6, 2–6
Loss	0–3	Mar 2018	Japan F2, Nishitōkyō	Futures	Hard	(United States) Daniel Nguyen	7–6^{(7–5)}, 6–7^{(3–7)}, 6–7^{(5–7)}
Win	1–3	Feb 2019	M15 Sharm El Sheikh, Egypt	World Tennis Tour	Hard	(Czech Republic) Vít Kopřiva	6–3, 6–3
Loss	1–4	Mar 2019	Santiago, Chile	Challenger	Clay	(Bolivia) Hugo Dellien	7–5, 6–7^{(1–7)}, 1–6
Loss	1–5	Sep 2021	Istanbul, Turkey	Challenger	Hard	(Australia) James Duckworth	4–6, 2–6
Win	2–5	Feb 2022	M25 Santo Domingo, Dominican Republic	World Tennis Tour	Hard	(Dominican Republic) Nick Hardt	7–5, 6–3
Win	3–5	Apr 2022	Tallahassee, U.S.	Challenger	Clay	(United States) Michael Mmoh	6–3, 6–4
Loss	3–6	May 2022	Little Rock, U.S.	Challenger	Hard	(Australia) Jason Kubler	0–6, 2–6
Loss	3–7	Nov 2022	Matsuyama, Japan	Challenger	Hard	(South Korea) Hong Seong-chan	3–6, 2–6
Loss	3–8	Jan 2023	Nonthaburi, Thailand	Challenger	Hard	(Austria) Dennis Novak	4–6, 4–6
Loss	3–9	Apr 2023	Tallahassee, U.S.	Challenger	Clay	(Belgium) Zizou Bergs	5–7, 2–6
Win	4–9	Sep 2024	Nonthaburi, Thailand	Challenger	Hard	(United States) Mackenzie McDonald	6–3, 7–6^{(7–4)}
Loss	4–10	Nov 2025	Brisbane, Australia	Challenger	Hard	(Australia) Alex Bolt	3–6, 3–6

=== Doubles: 4 (3–1) ===
Legend ATP Challengers (3–1) ITF Futures (0–0)	Finals by surface Hard (3–0) Clay (0–1) Grass (0–0) Carpet (0–0)

Result	W–L	Date	Tournament	Tier	Surface	Partner	Opponents	Score
Win	1–0	Nov 2018	Canberra, Australia	Challenger	Hard	(United Kingdom) Evan Hoyt	(Australia) Jeremy Beale (Australia) Thomas Fancutt	7–6^{(7–5)}, 5–7, [10–8]
Loss	1–1	Apr 2022	Savannah, U.S.	Challenger	Clay	(China) Zhang Zhizhen	(Philippines) Ruben Gonzales (Philippines) Treat Huey	6–7^{(3–7)}, 4–6
Win	2–1	Oct 2022	Seoul, South Korea	Challenger	Hard	(Japan) Kaichi Uchida	(South Korea) Chung Yun-seong (United States) Aleksandar Kovacevic	6–7^{(2–7)}, 7–5, [11–9]
Win	3–1	Mar 2026	Yokkaichi, Japan	Challenger	Hard	(China) Sun Fajing	(Australia) Ethan Cook (Australia) Tai Sach	7–6^{(8–6)}, 6–3
