= Little Rock Challenger =

Little Rock Open
- 2026 Little Rock Challenger

ATP Challenger Tour
- Event name: UAMS (University of Arkansas for Medical Sciences) Health Little Rock Open (2023-)
- Location: Little Rock, Arkansas, United States
- Venue: Rebsamen Tennis Center
- Category: ATP Challenger Tour
- Surface: Hard
- Draw: 48S/4Q/16D
- Prize money: $100,000 (2025)
- Website: website

The UAMS Health Little Rock Open is a professional tennis tournament played on hardcourts. It is currently part of the ATP Challenger Tour. It is held annually in Little Rock, Arkansas, United States since 2019.

== Past finals ==
=== Singles ===
Year	Champion	Runner-up	Score
2026	(United States) Colton Smith	(United States) Michael Mmoh	6–2, 6–4
2025	(United States) Patrick Kypson	(United States) Michael Zheng	6–1, 1–6, 7–5
2024	(United States) Mitchell Krueger	(Japan) Yuta Shimizu	6–3, 6–4
2023	(Estonia) Mark Lajal	(Kazakhstan) Beibit Zhukayev	6–4, 7–5
2022	(Australia) Jason Kubler	(Chinese Taipei) Wu Tung-lin	6–0, 6–2
2021	(United States) Jack Sock	(Ecuador) Emilio Gómez	7–5, 6–4
2020	Not held		
2019	(Israel) Dudi Sela	(South Korea) Lee Duck-hee	6–1, 4–3 ret.

=== Doubles ===
Year	Champions	Runners-up	Score
2026	(United States) Pranav Kumar (United States) Karl Poling	(Australia) Eric Padgham (Czech Republic) Jakub Vrba	6–4, 6–1
2025	(Tunisia) Aziz Dougaz (France) Antoine Escoffier	(Ecuador) Andrés Andrade (Colombia) Nicolás Mejía	6–2, 6–3
2024	(Canada) Liam Draxl (Canada) Benjamin Sigouin	(India) Rithvik Choudary Bollipalli (Mexico) Hans Hach Verdugo	6–4, 3–6, [10–7]
2023	(South Korea) Nam Ji-sung (New Zealand) Artem Sitak	(Canada) Alexis Galarneau (United States) Nicolas Moreno de Alboran	6–4, 6–4
2022	(Australia) Andrew Harris (United States) Christian Harrison	(United States) Robert Galloway (United States) Max Schnur	6–3, 6–4
2021	(Colombia) Nicolás Barrientos (United States) Ernesto Escobedo	(United States) Christopher Eubanks (Ecuador) Roberto Quiroz	4–6, 6–3, [10–5]
2020	Not held		
2019	(Argentina) Matías Franco Descotte (Brazil) Orlando Luz	(Philippines) Treat Huey (United States) Max Schnur	7–5, 1–6, [12–10]
