= 2025 Tyler Tennis Championships – Singles =

Singles
- 2025 Tyler Tennis Championships

Final
- Champion: (China) Wu Yibing
- Runner-up: (China) Zhou Yi
- Score: 6–4, 3–6, 6–3

Events
Singles	Doubles
← 2024 ·	Tyler Tennis Championships	· 2026 →

James Trotter was the defending champion but chose not to defend his title.

Wu Yibing won the title after defeating Zhou Yi 6–4, 3–6, 6–3 in the final.

== Seeds ==
1. (United States) Mitchell Krueger (second round)
2. (Canada) Liam Draxl (first round, retired)
3. (Japan) Yuta Shimizu (second round)
4. (France) Antoine Escoffier (second round)
5. (Tunisia) Aziz Dougaz (first round)
6. (Japan) Rio Noguchi (quarterfinals)
7. (Colombia) Nicolás Mejía (second round)
8. (United Kingdom) Paul Jubb (second round)

== Draw ==
=== Key ===
- Q = Qualifier
- WC = Wild card
- LL = Lucky loser
- Alt = Alternate
- ITF = ITF entry
- PR = Protected ranking
- SR = Special ranking
- SE = Special exempt
- JE = Junior exempt
- JR = Junior Accelerator Programme entrant
- CO = College Accelerator Programme entrant
- NG = Next Gen Accelerator Program entrant
- w/o = Walkover
- r = Retired
- d = Defaulted

=== Finals ===
Semifinals
(Brazil) Karuê Sell	6^{1}	4
Q	(China) Wu Yibing	7^{7}	6
(China) Zhou Yi	w/o
SE	(United States) Patrick Kypson

Final
Q	(China) Wu Yibing	6	3	6
(China) Zhou Yi	4	6	3

=== Top half ===
First round
1	(United States) M Krueger	7^{7}	5	6
(Chinese Taipei) T-l Wu	6^{4}	7	1
(United States) A Mayo	6	4	2
(Brazil) K Sell	2	6	6
(Ecuador) A Andrade	3	4
JR	(Spain) R Jódar	6	6
WC	(United States) A Martin	6	6
5	(Tunisia) A Dougaz	2	2
4	(France) A Escoffier	6	6
Q	(United States) Isaiah Strode	2	4
(United States) Patrick Maloney	5	6	2
Q	(China) Y Wu	7	4	6
(United States) G Nanda	4	3
Q	(United States) A Rybakov	6	6
(United States) T Zink	3	6^{6}
7	(Colombia) N Mejía	6	7^{8}

Second round
1	(United States) M Krueger	3	2
(Brazil) K Sell	6	6
JR	(Spain) R Jódar	5	6	5
WC	(United States) A Martin	7	2	7
4	(France) A Escoffier	6^{3}	5
Q	(China) Y Wu	7^{7}	7
Q	(United States) A Rybakov	6	6
7	(Colombia) N Mejía	3	4

Quarterfinals
(Brazil) K Sell	6	4	6
WC	(United States) A Martin	4	6	4
Q	(China) Y Wu	7^{7}	6
Q	(United States) A Rybakov	6^{2}	2

Semifinals
(Brazil) K Sell	6^{1}	4
Q	(China) Y Wu	7^{7}	6

=== Bottom half ===
First round
6	(Japan) R Noguchi	3	6	6
(United States) Christian Langmo	6	2	0
SE	(United States) M Zheng	6^{3}	4
WC	(United States) S Dostanic	7^{7}	6
(China) Y Zhou	6	6
Q	(United States) T Hilderbrand	1	4
Q	(Canada) Alvin Nicholas Tudorica	6	2	3
3	(Japan) Y Shimizu	3	6	6
8	(United Kingdom) P Jubb	4	6	6
Q	(South Korea) H Chung	6	4	4
LL	(Australia) M Bouzige	4	7^{7}	4
SE	(United States) P Kypson	6	6^{4}	6
JR	(United States) K Bigun	6	1	1^{r}
PR	I Ivashka	3	6	4
WC	(United States) T Svajda	1
2	(Canada) L Draxl	1^{r}

Second round
6	(Japan) R Noguchi	5	6	6
WC	(United States) S Dostanic	7	2	1
(China) Y Zhou	6	6
3	(Japan) Y Shimizu	3	4
8	(United Kingdom) P Jubb	5	1
SE	(United States) P Kypson	7	6
PR	I Ivashka	5	3
WC	(United States) T Svajda	7	6

Quarterfinals
6	(Japan) R Noguchi	5	2
(China) Y Zhou	7	6
SE	(United States) P Kypson	6	7
WC	(United States) T Svajda	4	5

Semifinals
(China) Y Zhou	w/o
SE	(United States) P Kypson
