= 2026 Tyler Tennis Championships – Singles =

Singles
- 2026 Tyler Tennis Championships

Final
- Champion: (Australia) Adam Walton
- Runner-up: (United States) Andre Ilagan
- Score: 7–5, 6–1

Events
Singles	Doubles
- Tyler Tennis Championships

Wu Yibing was the defending champion but chose not to defend his title.

Adam Walton won the title after defeating Andre Ilagan 7–5, 6–1 in the final.

== Seeds ==
1. (Australia) Adam Walton (champion)
2. (Australia) Dane Sweeny (first round)
3. (Canada) Liam Draxl (semifinals)
4. (Colombia) Nicolás Mejía (first round)
5. (United States) Colton Smith (first round)
6. (Australia) Bernard Tomic (first round)
7. (Ecuador) Andy Andrade (first round)
8. (Lithuania) Edas Butvilas (second round)

== Draw ==
Key

- Q = Qualifier
- WC = Wild card
- LL = Lucky loser
- Alt = Alternate
- ITF = ITF entry
- PR = Protected ranking
- SR = Special ranking
- SE = Special exempt
- JE = Junior exempt
- JR = Junior Accelerator Programme entrant
- CO = College Accelerator Programme entrant
- NG = Next Gen Accelerator Program entrant
- w/o = Walkover
- r = Retired
- d = Defaulted

=== Finals ===
Semifinals
1	(Australia) Adam Walton	6	6
3	(Canada) Liam Draxl	4	4
Q	(United States) Karl Poling	6	1	6^{8}
(United States) Andre Ilagan	3	6	7^{10}

Final
1	(Australia) Adam Walton	7	6
(United States) Andre Ilagan	5	1

=== Top half ===
First round
1	(Australia) A Walton	4	7^{7}	6
(Chinese Taipei) T-l Wu	6	6^{4}	1
(United States) A Martin	7^{7}	7^{7}
PR	(Australia) B Ellis	6^{5}	6^{5}
WC	(United States) Landon Ardila	6	6
(United States) T Zink	4	4
CO	(France) T Legout	7	7
7	(Ecuador) A Andrade	5	5
3	(Canada) L Draxl	6	6
Q	(United States) Aidan Kim	1	3
WC	(United States) S Gorzny	6	6
Q	(United States) A Fenty	4	4
Q	(United States) B Shick	6	2	6
PR	(United States) A Mayo	2	6	2
Q	(Japan) M Imamura	7	6
5	(United States) C Smith	5	3

Second round
1	(Australia) A Walton	6	6
(United States) A Martin	2	2
WC	(United States) L Ardila	1	0
CO	(France) T Legout	6	6
3	(Canada) L Draxl	6	1	6
WC	(United States) S Gorzny	3	6	3
Q	(United States) B Shick	7	7^{8}
Q	(Japan) M Imamura	5	6^{6}

Quarterfinals
1	(Australia) A Walton	6	6
CO	(France) T Legout	2	2
3	(Canada) L Draxl	6	6
Q	(United States) B Shick	2	3

Semifinals
1	(Australia) A Walton	6	6
3	(Canada) L Draxl	4	4

=== Bottom half ===
First round
6	(Australia) B Tomic	6^{4}	6^{5}
LL	(Japan) H Matsuoka	7^{7}	7^{7}
NG	(United Kingdom) H Searle	6	6
(United States) M Krueger	4	4
(Jamaica) B Bicknell	6^{4}	6	6
(United Kingdom) J Monday	7^{7}	4	4
Q	(United States) K Poling	6	6
4	(Colombia) N Mejía	4	4
8	(Lithuania) E Butvilas	7^{7}	6
WC	(United States) T Svajda	6^{1}	4
(China) F Sun	3	6^{1}
(United States) Andre Ilagan	6	7^{7}
(United States) M Cassone	6	6
Q	(United States) D Milavsky	4	1
Alt	(Japan) Y Shimizu	7	7
2	(Australia) D Sweeny	5	5

Second round
LL	(Japan) H Matsuoka	2	2
NG	(United Kingdom) H Searle	6	6
(Jamaica) B Bicknell	5	5
Q	(United States) K Poling	7	7
8	(Lithuania) E Butvilas	3	4
(United States) A Ilagan	6	6
(United States) M Cassone	7^{8}	6^{6}	6^{3}
Alt	(Japan) Y Shimizu	6^{6}	7^{8}	7^{7}

Quarterfinals
NG	(United Kingdom) H Searle	6^{2}	6	3
Q	(United States) K Poling	7^{7}	3	6
(United States) A Ilagan	4	7^{7}	6
Alt	(Japan) Y Shimizu	6	6^{5}	4

Semifinals
Q	(United States) K Poling	6	1	6^{8}
(United States) A Ilagan	3	6	7^{10}
