= 2026 Sarasota Open – Singles =

Singles
- 2026 Sarasota Open

Final
- Champion: (China) Wu Yibing
- Runner-up: (United States) Stefan Dostanic
- Score: 6–1, 4–6, 6–3

Events
Singles	Doubles
- Sarasota Open

Emilio Nava was the defending champion but chose not to defend his title.

Wu Yibing won the title after defeating Stefan Dostanic 6–1, 4–6, 6–3 in the final.

== Seeds ==
1. (China) Wu Yibing (champion)
2. (United States) Martin Damm (first round)
3. (Bolivia) Hugo Dellien (quarterfinals)
4. (United States) Colton Smith (first round)
5. (Argentina) Federico Agustín Gómez (first round, retired)
6. (Estonia) Daniil Glinka (quarterfinals)
7. (France) Clément Tabur (first round)
8. (United States) Nishesh Basavareddy (quarterfinals, retired)

== Draw ==
Key

- Q = Qualifier
- WC = Wild card
- LL = Lucky loser
- Alt = Alternate
- ITF = ITF entry
- PR = Protected ranking
- SR = Special ranking
- SE = Special exempt
- JE = Junior exempt
- JR = Junior Accelerator Programme entrant
- CO = College Accelerator Programme entrant
- NG = Next Gen Accelerator Program entrant
- w/o = Walkover
- r = Retired
- d = Defaulted

=== Finals ===
Semifinals
1	(China) Wu Yibing	6	7
(United States) Darwin Blanch	3	5
(Ecuador) Andy Andrade	3	4
(United States) Stefan Dostanic	6	6

Final
1	(China) Wu Yibing	6	4	6
(United States) Stefan Dostanic	1	6	3

=== Top half ===
First round
1	(China) Y Wu	6	6
Q	(Morocco) R Bennani	1	4
WC	(Japan) K Nishikori	6	6
(Argentina) N Kicker	3	2
(Colombia) DE Galán	2	6^{2}
Q	(United States) G Johns	6	7^{7}
(Brazil) D Dutra da Silva	7	7^{7}
7	(France) C Tabur	5	6^{4}
3	(Bolivia) H Dellien	6	7
(Argentina) GA Olivieri	2	5
Q	(Switzerland) K Feldbausch	6	7
WC	(United States) C Kingsley	3	5
(Croatia) D Ajduković	6	6
(France) S Gueymard Wayenburg	4	3
(United States) Dar Blanch	6	1
5	(Argentina) FA Gómez	3	1^{r}

Second round
1	(China) Y Wu	6	3	6
WC	(Japan) K Nishikori	3	6	1
Q	(United States) G Johns	4	3
(Brazil) D Dutra da Silva	6	6
3	(Bolivia) H Dellien	6	5	6
Q	(Switzerland) K Feldbausch	1	7	3
(Croatia) D Ajduković	1	2
(United States) Dar Blanch	6	6

Quarterfinals
1	(China) Y Wu	6	7^{7}
(Brazil) D Dutra da Silva	4	6^{4}
3	(Bolivia) H Dellien	1	5
(United States) Dar Blanch	6	7

Semifinals
1	(China) Y Wu	6	7
(United States) Dar Blanch	3	5

=== Bottom half ===
First round
6	(Estonia) D Glinka	6	7^{7}
WC	(United States) JJ Wolf	3	6^{4}
Q	(United States) S Kirchheimer	4	7	7^{7}
NG	(France) T Faurel	6	5	6^{2}
Q	(United States) B Kuzuhara	6^{8}	6	3
(Ecuador) A Andrade	7^{10}	4	6
(United States) T Zink	6	1	6
4	(United States) C Smith	1	6	2
8	(United States) N Basavareddy	6	7^{7}
Q	(Canada) L Draxl	3	6^{5}
(United States) M Krueger	4	4
(Czech Republic) H Bartoň	6	6
(United States) S Dostanic	6	6
(Georgia (country)) S Purtseladze	2	3
(United States) A Rybakov	3	7^{7}	6
2	(United States) M Damm	6	6^{3}	3

Second round
6	(Estonia) D Glinka	6	6
Q	(United States) S Kirchheimer	3	2
(Ecuador) A Andrade	2	6	7
(United States) T Zink	6	4	5
8	(United States) N Basavareddy	6	7^{8}
(Czech Republic) H Bartoň	1	6^{6}
(United States) S Dostanic	6	4	6
(United States) A Rybakov	2	6	4

Quarterfinals
6	(Estonia) D Glinka	4	2
(Ecuador) A Andrade	6	6
8	(United States) N Basavareddy	7	2	0^{r}
(United States) S Dostanic	5	6	0

Semifinals
(Ecuador) A Andrade	3	4
(United States) S Dostanic	6	6
