= 2026 Sarasota Open – Doubles =

Doubles
- 2026 Sarasota Open

Final
- Champions: (Czech Republic) Hynek Bartoň (United States) Martin Damm
- Runners-up: (United States) Garrett Johns (United States) Theodore Winegar
- Score: 6–2, 6–1

Events
Singles	Doubles
- Sarasota Open

Robert Cash and JJ Tracy were the defending champions but chose not to defend their title.

Hynek Bartoň and Martin Damm won the title after defeating Garrett Johns and Theodore Winegar 6–2, 6–1 in the final.

== Seeds ==
1. (Canada) Cleeve Harper / (United Kingdom) David Stevenson (semifinals)
2. (Bolivia) Boris Arias / (Denmark) Johannes Ingildsen (quarterfinals)
3. (Venezuela) Luis David Martínez / (Colombia) Cristian Rodríguez (first round)
4. (Czech Republic) Jan Jermář / (Poland) Szymon Kielan (first round)

== Draw ==
Key

- Q = Qualifier
- WC = Wild card
- LL = Lucky loser
- Alt = Alternate
- ITF = ITF entry
- PR = Protected ranking
- SR = Special ranking
- SE = Special exempt
- JE = Junior exempt
- JR = Junior Accelerator Programme entrant
- CO = College Accelerator Programme entrant
- NG = Next Gen Accelerator Program entrant
- w/o = Walkover
- r = Retired
- d = Defaulted

First round
1	(Canada) C Harper (United Kingdom) D Stevenson	6	6
WC	(United States) Wally Thayne (United States) Jamie Vance	0	4
WC	(United States) S Kirchheimer (United States) Jack Vance	4	4
(France) T Faurel (France) S Gueymard Wayenburg	6	6
3	(Venezuela) LD Martínez (Colombia) C Rodríguez	1	6	[4]
(Argentina) FA Gómez (Argentina) N Kicker	6	3	[10]
(United States) C Kingsley (United States) C Smith	3	4
(United States) G Johns (United States) T Winegar	6	6
(United Kingdom) S Duncan (Brazil) D Dutra da Silva	6	6
(United States) M Krueger (United States) T Zink	1	2
(Ecuador) A Andrade (Canada) L Draxl	4	6	[11]
4	(Czech Republic) J Jermář (Poland) S Kielan	6	1	[9]
(Czech Republic) H Bartoň (United States) M Damm	6	7^{7}
(Venezuela) Juan José Bianchi (United States) J Sheehy	4	6^{4}
(United States) B Kittay (Argentina) GA Olivieri	4	7^{7}	[6]
2	(Bolivia) B Arias (Denmark) J Ingildsen	6	6^{3}	[10]

Quarterfinals
1	(Canada) C Harper (United Kingdom) D Stevenson	4	6	[10]
(France) T Faurel (France) S Gueymard Wayenburg	6	4	[6]
(Argentina) FA Gómez (Argentina) N Kicker	4	0^{r}
(United States) G Johns (United States) T Winegar	6	1
(United Kingdom) S Duncan (Brazil) D Dutra da Silva	5	6	[6]
(Ecuador) A Andrade (Canada) L Draxl	7	3	[10]
(Czech Republic) H Bartoň (United States) M Damm	7	4	[10]
2	(Bolivia) B Arias (Denmark) J Ingildsen	5	6	[3]

Semifinals
1	(Canada) C Harper (United Kingdom) D Stevenson	6^{3}	4
(United States) G Johns (United States) T Winegar	7^{7}	6
(Ecuador) A Andrade (Canada) L Draxl	3	4
(Czech Republic) H Bartoň (United States) M Damm	6	6

Final
(United States) G Johns (United States) T Winegar	2	1
(Czech Republic) H Bartoň (United States) M Damm	6	6
