= 2025 Tyler Tennis Championships – Doubles =

Doubles
- 2025 Tyler Tennis Championships

Final
- Champions: (New Zealand) Finn Reynolds (New Zealand) James Watt
- Runners-up: (Spain) Àlex Martínez (Colombia) Adrià Soriano Barrera
- Score: 6–3, 6–1

Events
Singles	Doubles
- Tyler Tennis Championships

Hans Hach Verdugo and James Trotter were the defending champions but only Hach Verdugo chose to defend his title, partnering Joshua Sheehy. They lost in the quarterfinals to Àlex Martínez and Adrià Soriano Barrera.

Finn Reynolds and James Watt won the title after defeating Martínez and Soriano Barrera 6–3, 6–1 in the final.

== Seeds ==
1. (United States) George Goldhoff / (United States) Trey Hilderbrand (semifinals)
2. (India) Niki Kaliyanda Poonacha / (India) Jeevan Nedunchezhiyan (first round)
3. (Brazil) Luís Britto / (Thailand) Pruchya Isaro (semifinals)
4. (New Zealand) Finn Reynolds / (New Zealand) James Watt (champions)

== Draw ==
Key

- Q = Qualifier
- WC = Wild card
- LL = Lucky loser
- Alt = Alternate
- ITF = ITF entry
- PR = Protected ranking
- SR = Special ranking
- SE = Special exempt
- JE = Junior exempt
- JR = Junior Accelerator Programme entrant
- CO = College Accelerator Programme entrant
- NG = Next Gen Accelerator Program entrant
- w/o = Walkover
- r = Retired
- d = Defaulted

=== Draw ===
First round
1	(United States) G Goldhoff (United States) T Hilderbrand	6	6
Alt	(United States) S Kozlov (United States) Jamie Vance	3	1
WC	(United States) William Manning (United States) B Shick	7	6^{5}	[10]
(Ecuador) A Andrade (Colombia) N Mejía	5	7^{7}	[6]
4	(New Zealand) F Reynolds (New Zealand) J Watt	4	6	[10]
Alt	(Australia) H Jones (Australia) D Sweeny	6	2	[4]
WC	(United States) Zachary Fuchs (United States) Wally Thayne	6^{2}	6	[7]
(China) A Wang (China) Y Zhou	7^{7}	4	[10]
(Australia) P Harper (Australia) K Pearson	7	4	[7]
(United States) M Kiger (United States) Patrick Maloney	5	6	[10]
(United States) A Martin (United States) G Nanda	2	7^{7}	[3]
3	(Brazil) L Britto (Thailand) P Isaro	6	6^{5}	[10]
(Spain) Àlex Martínez (Colombia) A Soriano Barrera	6	6^{4}	[10]
(United States) P Kumar (Antigua and Barbuda) J Maginley	4	7^{7}	[6]
(Mexico) H Hach Verdugo (United States) J Sheehy	7^{7}	4	[12]
2	(India) N Kaliyanda Poonacha (India) J Nedunchezhiyan	6^{1}	6	[10]

Quarterfinals
1	(United States) G Goldhoff (United States) T Hilderbrand	6	7^{7}
WC	(United States) W Manning (United States) B Shick	3	6^{4}
4	(New Zealand) F Reynolds (New Zealand) J Watt	6	6
(China) A Wang (China) Y Zhou	3	4
(United States) M Kiger (United States) P Maloney	6	6^{4}	[9]
3	(Brazil) L Britto (Thailand) P Isaro	3	7^{7}	[11]
(Spain) À Martínez (Colombia) A Soriano Barrera	2	7^{8}	[15]
(Mexico) H Hach Verdugo (United States) J Sheehy	6	6^{6}	[13]

Semifinals
1	(United States) G Goldhoff (United States) T Hilderbrand	2	3
4	(New Zealand) F Reynolds (New Zealand) J Watt	6	6
3	(Brazil) L Britto (Thailand) P Isaro	6	3	[9]
(Spain) À Martínez (Colombia) A Soriano Barrera	4	6	[11]

Final
4	(New Zealand) F Reynolds (New Zealand) J Watt	6	6
(Spain) À Martínez (Colombia) A Soriano Barrera	3	1
