= 2023 Tyler Tennis Championships – Doubles =

Doubles
- 2023 Tyler Tennis Championships

Final
- Champions: (Australia) Alex Bolt (Australia) Andrew Harris
- Runners-up: (United States) Evan King (United States) Reese Stalder
- Score: 6–1, 6–4

Events
Singles	Doubles
Tyler Tennis Championships	· 2024 →

This was the first edition of the tournament.

Alex Bolt and Andrew Harris won the title after defeating Evan King and Reese Stalder 6–1, 6–4 in the final.

== Seeds ==
1. (United States) Evan King / (United States) Reese Stalder (final)
2. (United States) Alex Lawson / (Greece) Michail Pervolarakis (first round)
3. (South Korea) Nam Ji-sung / (New Zealand) Artem Sitak (first round)
4. (Japan) Toshihide Matsui / (Japan) Kaito Uesugi (quarterfinals)

== Draw ==
=== Key ===
- Q = Qualifier
- WC = Wild card
- LL = Lucky loser
- Alt = Alternate
- ITF = ITF entry
- PR = Protected ranking
- SR = Special ranking
- SE = Special exempt
- JE = Junior exempt
- JR = Junior Accelerator Programme entrant
- CO = College Accelerator Programme entrant
- NG = Next Gen Accelerator Program entrant
- w/o = Walkover
- r = Retired
- d = Defaulted

First round
1	(United States) E King (United States) R Stalder	6	7^{9}
Alt/PR	(United States) T Sandgren (Denmark) M Torpegaard	3	6^{7}
(Canada) S Diez (United States) N Moreno de Alboran	3	4
(India) A Kadhe (Germany) D Masur	6	6
3	(South Korea) J-s Nam (New Zealand) A Sitak	3	4
WC	(United States) Reed Collier; Ilgiz Valiev	6	6
(Australia) C Puttergill (Canada) K Stevenson	7	6
(Norway) V Durasovic (United Kingdom) G Hussey	5	4
(Australia) A Bolt (Australia) A Harris	6	6
(Mexico) H Hach Verdugo (United States) M Krueger	4	3
Alt	(Brazil) M Alves (Brazil) G Heide	1	2
4	(Japan) T Matsui (Japan) K Uesugi	6	6
WC	(United States) T Hilderbrand (United States) N Schachter	6	6
(Tunisia) S Mansouri (New Zealand) R Statham	4	3
(Australia) T Schoolkate (Australia) A Walton	6	6
2	(United States) A Lawson (Greece) M Pervolarakis	3	4

Quarterfinals
1	(United States) E King (United States) R Stalder	7^{8}	6^{9}	[10]
(India) A Kadhe (Germany) D Masur	6^{6}	7^{11}	[6]
WC	(United States) R Collier; I Valiev	3	3
(Australia) C Puttergill (Canada) K Stevenson	6	6
(Australia) A Bolt (Australia) A Harris	6	6
4	(Japan) T Matsui (Japan) K Uesugi	3	4
WC	(United States) T Hilderbrand (United States) N Schachter	5	6	[6]
(Australia) T Schoolkate (Australia) A Walton	7	3	[10]

Semifinals
1	(United States) E King (United States) R Stalder	6^{6}	6	[11]
(Australia) C Puttergill (Canada) K Stevenson	7^{8}	3	[9]
(Australia) A Bolt (Australia) A Harris	3	6	[10]
(Australia) T Schoolkate (Australia) A Walton	6	1	[8]

Final
1	(United States) E King (United States) R Stalder	1	4
(Australia) A Bolt (Australia) A Harris	6	6
