= 2025 Tyler Tennis Championships =

- Date: 2 – 8 June
- Edition: 3rd
- Surface: Hard
- Location: Tyler, Texas, United States

Champions

Singles
- (China) Wu Yibing

Doubles
- (New Zealand) Finn Reynolds / (New Zealand) James Watt
- Tyler Tennis Championships

The 2025 Texas Spine and Joint Men's Championships was a professional tennis tournament played on hardcourts. It was the third edition of the tournament which was part of the 2025 ATP Challenger Tour. It took place in Tyler, Texas, United States between June 2 and June 8, 2025.

== Singles main-draw entrants ==
=== Seeds ===
Country	Player	Rank^{1}	Seed
USA	Mitchell Krueger	140	1
CAN	Liam Draxl	146	2
JPN	Yuta Shimizu	191	3
FRA	Antoine Escoffier	215	4
TUN	Aziz Dougaz	222	5
JPN	Rio Noguchi	246	6
COL	Nicolás Mejía	250	7
GBR	Paul Jubb	254	8

- ^{1} Rankings are as of 26 May 2025.

=== Other entrants ===
The following players received wildcards into the singles main draw:

- (United States) Stefan Dostanic
- (United States) Andres Martin
- (United States) Trevor Svajda

The following player received entry into the singles main draw using a protected ranking:

- Ilya Ivashka

The following players received entry into the singles main draw as special exempts:

- (United States) Patrick Kypson
- (United States) Michael Zheng

The following players received entry into the singles main draw through the Junior Accelerator programme:

- (United States) Kaylan Bigun
- (Spain) Rafael Jódar

The following players received entry from the qualifying draw:

- (South Korea) Chung Hyeon
- (United States) Trey Hilderbrand
- (United States) Alex Rybakov
- (United States) Isaiah Strode
- (Canada) Alvin Nicholas Tudorica
- (China) Wu Yibing

The following player received entry as a lucky loser:

- (Australia) Moerani Bouzige

== Champions ==
=== Singles ===
- (China) Wu Yibing def. (China) Zhou Yi 6–4, 3–6, 6–3.

=== Doubles ===
- (New Zealand) Finn Reynolds / (New Zealand) James Watt def. (Spain) Àlex Martínez / (Colombia) Adrià Soriano Barrera 6–3, 6–1.
