= 2024 Savannah Challenger – Singles =

Singles
- 2024 Savannah Challenger

Final
- Champion: (Switzerland) Alexander Ritschard
- Runner-up: (Ecuador) Andrés Andrade
- Score: 6–2, 6–4

Events
Singles	Doubles
- Savannah Challenger

Facundo Díaz Acosta was the defending champion but chose not to defend his title.

Alexander Ritschard won the title after defeating Andrés Andrade 6–2, 6–4 in the final.

== Seeds ==
1. (United States) J. J. Wolf (first round)
2. (United States) Michael Mmoh (first round, retired)
3. (United States) Patrick Kypson (first round)
4. (United States) Denis Kudla (second round)
5. (Switzerland) Alexander Ritschard (champion)
6. (United States) Tristan Boyer (quarterfinals)
7. (United Kingdom) Oliver Crawford (first round)
8. (France) Clément Tabur (first round)

== Draw ==
Key

- Q = Qualifier
- WC = Wild card
- LL = Lucky loser
- Alt = Alternate
- ITF = ITF entry
- PR = Protected ranking
- SR = Special ranking
- SE = Special exempt
- JE = Junior exempt
- JR = Junior Accelerator Programme entrant
- CO = College Accelerator Programme entrant
- NG = Next Gen Accelerator Program entrant
- w/o = Walkover
- r = Retired
- d = Defaulted

=== Finals ===
Semifinals
5	(Switzerland) Alexander Ritschard	6	7^{7}
(Kazakhstan) Dmitry Popko	4	6^{4}
(France) Maxime Janvier	5	0
Q	(Ecuador) Andrés Andrade	7	6

Final
5	(Switzerland) Alexander Ritschard	6	6
Q	(Ecuador) Andrés Andrade	2	4

=== Top half ===
First round
1	(United States) JJ Wolf	2	1
(Austria) JJ Schwärzler	6	6
(France) C Hemery	7	6
(United Kingdom) H Searle	5	4
(Australia) O Jasika	1
Alt	(Australia) B Tomic	1^{r}
WC	(United States) S Kozlov	3	5
5	(Switzerland) A Ritschard	6	7
4	(United States) D Kudla	6	7^{7}
Q	(United States) Tristan McCormick	4	6^{4}
(Netherlands) G Brouwer	6	6
Alt	(Lebanon) H Habib	2	4
(Kazakhstan) D Popko	6	6
WC	(United States) B Kuzuhara	3	4
(United States) E Quinn	6	6
7	(United Kingdom) O Crawford	2	4

Second round
(Austria) JJ Schwärzler	4	2
(France) C Hemery	6	6
(Australia) O Jasika	1	1
5	(Switzerland) A Ritschard	6	6
4	(United States) D Kudla	3	4
(Netherlands) G Brouwer	6	6
(Kazakhstan) D Popko	6	5	6
(United States) E Quinn	4	7	3

Quarterfinals
(France) C Hemery	5	5
5	(Switzerland) A Ritschard	7	7
(Netherlands) G Brouwer	6^{7}	4
(Kazakhstan) D Popko	7^{9}	6

Semifinals
5	(Switzerland) A Ritschard	6	7^{7}
(Kazakhstan) D Popko	4	6^{4}

=== Bottom half ===
First round
6	(United States) T Boyer	7	6
(Venezuela) G Oliveira	5	1
(United States) T-S Kwiatkowski	3	6^{4}
(United States) T Sandgren	6	7^{7}
WC	(United States) S Kirchheimer	6	2	1
Q	(Romania) GA Boitan	2	6	6
(France) M Janvier	3	7^{7}	6
3	(United States) P Kypson	6	6^{5}	4
8	(France) C Tabur	3	2
(United States) M Krueger	6	6
Q	(Norway) V Durasovic	6^{3}	2
Q	(Ecuador) A Andrade	7^{7}	6
Q	(France) A Géa	3	7^{7}	3
Q	(Argentina) FA Gómez	6	6^{5}	6
Alt	(United States) A Mayo	4	6	2
2	(United States) M Mmoh	6	4	0^{r}

Second round
6	(United States) T Boyer	1	6	6
(United States) T Sandgren	6	0	1
Q	(Romania) GA Boitan	6	1	3
(France) M Janvier	3	6	6
(United States) M Krueger	3	6^{3}
Q	(Ecuador) A Andrade	6	7^{7}
Q	(Argentina) FA Gómez	6	7^{7}
Alt	(United States) A Mayo	3	6^{5}

Quarterfinals
6	(United States) T Boyer	6	2	3
(France) M Janvier	2	6	6
Q	(Ecuador) A Andrade	7	6
Q	(Argentina) FA Gómez	5	1

Semifinals
(France) M Janvier	5	0
Q	(Ecuador) A Andrade	7	6
