= 2026 Tallahassee Tennis Challenger – Singles =

Singles
- 2026 Tallahassee Tennis Challenger

Final
- Champion: (France) Clément Tabur
- Runner-up: (Brazil) João Lucas Reis da Silva
- Score: 6–4, 1–0 ret.

Events
Singles	Doubles
- Tallahassee Tennis Challenger

Chris Rodesch was the defending champion but chose not to defend his title.

Clément Tabur won the title after João Lucas Reis da Silva retired trailing 0–1, 4–6 in the final.

== Seeds ==
1. (Canada) Liam Draxl (second round)
2. (Argentina) Federico Agustín Gómez (first round)
3. (United States) Nishesh Basavareddy (withdrew)
4. (Estonia) Daniil Glinka (quarterfinals)
5. (France) Clément Tabur (champion)
6. (United States) Colton Smith (first round)
7. (Austria) Lukas Neumayer (first round, retired)
8. (Argentina) Genaro Alberto Olivieri (first round)

== Draw ==
Key

- Q = Qualifier
- WC = Wild card
- LL = Lucky loser
- Alt = Alternate
- ITF = ITF entry
- PR = Protected ranking
- SR = Special ranking
- SE = Special exempt
- JE = Junior exempt
- JR = Junior Accelerator Programme entrant
- CO = College Accelerator Programme entrant
- NG = Next Gen Accelerator Program entrant
- w/o = Walkover
- r = Retired
- d = Defaulted

=== Finals ===
Semifinals
(Brazil) João Lucas Reis da Silva	6	2	6
JR	(United States) Jack Kennedy	2	6	4
5	(France) Clément Tabur	6	6
WC	(United States) Michael Mmoh	4	2

Final
(Brazil) João Lucas Reis da Silva	4	0^{r}
5	(France) Clément Tabur	6	1

=== Top half ===
First round
1	(Canada) L Draxl	3	6	6
WC	(United States) K Bigun	6	2	1
(Brazil) JL Reis da Silva	6	6
(Argentina) N Kicker	2	3
Q	(United States) S Kozlov	6^{3}	2
Alt	(United States) A Rybakov	7^{7}	6
(Brazil) P Boscardin Dias	4	6	6
8	(Argentina) GA Olivieri	6	4	3
4	(Estonia) D Glinka	6	7^{7}
CO	(United States) S Dostanic	2	6^{3}
(United States) Dar Blanch	3	6	6
(Colombia) DE Galán	6	1	4
Alt	(Croatia) D Ajduković	3	4
(United Kingdom) O Crawford	6	6
JR	(United States) J Kennedy	3	6	4
7	(Austria) L Neumayer	6	4	0^{r}

Second round
1	(Canada) L Draxl	3	5
(Brazil) JL Reis da Silva	6	7
Alt	(United States) A Rybakov	6	5	5
(Brazil) P Boscardin Dias	2	7	7
4	(Estonia) D Glinka	6	6
(United States) Dar Blanch	3	4
(United Kingdom) O Crawford	6^{4}	6	5
JR	(United States) J Kennedy	7^{7}	4	7

Quarterfinals
(Brazil) JL Reis da Silva	6	4	6
(Brazil) P Boscardin Dias	4	6	4
4	(Estonia) D Glinka	4	4
JR	(United States) J Kennedy	6	6

Semifinals
(Brazil) JL Reis da Silva	6	2	6
JR	(United States) J Kennedy	2	6	4

=== Bottom half ===
First round
5	(France) C Tabur	6	3
(France) S Gueymard Wayenburg	1	0^{r}
(United States) A Martin	6	7
Q	(United States) Christian Langmo	4	5
Alt	(Georgia (country)) S Purtseladze	6	6^{6}	1
Q	(United States) T Zink	4	7^{8}	6
(United States) M Krueger	2	6	6
LL	(Brazil) D Dutra da Silva	6	3	4
6	(United States) C Smith	6^{6}	1
Q	(United States) G Johns	7^{8}	6
Q	(United States) B Kuzuhara	6	4	3
Q	(Czech Republic) H Bartoň	4	6	6
(Kazakhstan) D Popko	3	6	5
WC	(United States) C Kingsley	6	3	7
WC	(United States) M Mmoh	6	6
2	(Argentina) FA Gómez	2	1

Second round
5	(France) C Tabur	6	5	6
(United States) A Martin	3	7	3
Q	(United States) T Zink	6	6
(United States) M Krueger	1	2
Q	(United States) G Johns	4	4
Q	(Czech Republic) H Bartoň	6	6
WC	(United States) C Kingsley	6	6^{4}	4
WC	(United States) M Mmoh	4	7^{7}	6

Quarterfinals
5	(France) C Tabur	6	6
Q	(United States) T Zink	1	4
Q	(Czech Republic) H Bartoň	3	6^{5}
WC	(United States) M Mmoh	6	7^{7}

Semifinals
5	(France) C Tabur	6	6
WC	(United States) M Mmoh	4	2
