= 2024 Tyler Tennis Championships – Singles =

Singles
- 2024 Tyler Tennis Championships

Final
- Champion: (Japan) James Trotter
- Runner-up: (United States) Brandon Holt
- Score: 6–2, 7–6^{(7–3)}

Events
Singles	Doubles
- Tyler Tennis Championships

Nicolas Moreno de Alboran was the defending champion but chose not to defend his title.

James Trotter won the title after defeating Brandon Holt 6–2, 7–6^{(7–3)} in the final.

== Seeds ==
1. (Canada) Alexis Galarneau (quarterfinals)
2. (Hong Kong) Coleman Wong (semifinals)
3. (South Korea) Hong Seong-chan (quarterfinals)
4. (Chinese Taipei) Hsu Yu-hsiou (first round)
5. (Australia) Bernard Tomic (withdrew)
6. (Jordan) Abdullah Shelbayh (quarterfinals)
7. (United States) Mitchell Krueger (second round)
8. (Canada) Liam Draxl (semifinals)

== Draw ==
Key

- Q = Qualifier
- WC = Wild card
- LL = Lucky loser
- Alt = Alternate
- ITF = ITF entry
- PR = Protected ranking
- SR = Special ranking
- SE = Special exempt
- JE = Junior exempt
- JR = Junior Accelerator Programme entrant
- CO = College Accelerator Programme entrant
- NG = Next Gen Accelerator Program entrant
- w/o = Walkover
- r = Retired
- d = Defaulted

=== Finals ===
Semifinals
(United States) Brandon Holt	6	7
8	(Canada) Liam Draxl	4	5
(Japan) James Trotter	6	4	7^{7}
2	(Hong Kong) Coleman Wong	2	6	6^{4}

Final
(United States) Brandon Holt	2	6^{3}
(Japan) James Trotter	6	7^{7}

=== Top half ===
First round
1	(Canada) A Galarneau	6	7
WC	(United States) Rudy Quan	2	5
Q	(Poland) F Peliwo	5	2
(Chinese Taipei) T-l Wu	7	6
(United States) B Holt	6	5	6
Alt	(Japan) Y Takahashi	2	7	1
Q	(United States) S Kirchheimer	3	1
7	(United States) M Krueger	6	6
3	(South Korea) S-c Hong	6	2	7^{7}
(Ecuador) A Andrade	2	6	6^{1}
(Colombia) N Mejía	7^{7}	3	3
Q	(Mexico) E Escobedo	6^{4}	6	6
(Japan) Y Shimizu	6	6
(United States) A Mayo	4	2
(United States) N Chappell	1	4
8	(Canada) L Draxl	6	6

Second round
1	(Canada) A Galarneau	7^{7}	6
(Chinese Taipei) T-l Wu	6^{1}	1
(United States) B Holt	1	7^{7}	7^{7}
7	(United States) M Krueger	6	6^{4}	6^{4}
3	(South Korea) S-c Hong	3	6	6
Q	(Mexico) E Escobedo	6	4	2
(Japan) Y Shimizu	7^{9}	5	0
8	(Canada) L Draxl	6^{7}	7	6

Quarterfinals
1	(Canada) A Galarneau	6	3	1
(United States) B Holt	3	6	6
3	(South Korea) S-c Hong	2	2
8	(Canada) L Draxl	6	6

Semifinals
(United States) B Holt	6	7
8	(Canada) L Draxl	4	5

=== Bottom half ===
First round
6	(Jordan) A Shelbayh	7	6
(India) R Ramanathan	5	1
Q	(Australia) M Bouzige	7^{8}	6^{7}	3
WC	(United States) B Kuzuhara	6^{6}	7^{9}	6
(Japan) J Trotter	6	7^{7}
WC	(United States) T Svajda	4	6^{5}
Q	(United States) Christian Langmo	7^{7}	6
4	(Chinese Taipei) Y-h Hsu	6^{4}	2
LL	(Sweden) L Borg	6	2	2
Q	(United States) E Quinn	4	6	6
(Japan) H Moriya	7	1
(United States) T-S Kwiatkowski	5	0^{r}
Alt	(United States) S Kozlov	6	6
(Jamaica) B Bicknell	3	3
(United States) C Kingsley	5	4
2	(Hong Kong) C Wong	7	6

Second round
6	(Jordan) A Shelbayh	6	6
WC	(United States) B Kuzuhara	2	3
(Japan) J Trotter	6	6
Q	(United States) C Langmo	3	4
Q	(United States) E Quinn	7^{7}	7
(Japan) H Moriya	6^{5}	5
Alt	(United States) S Kozlov	6	4	1^{r}
2	(Hong Kong) C Wong	4	6	4

Quarterfinals
6	(Jordan) A Shelbayh	2	5
(Japan) J Trotter	6	7
Q	(United States) E Quinn	2	2
2	(Hong Kong) C Wong	6	6

Semifinals
(Japan) J Trotter	6	4	7^{7}
2	(Hong Kong) C Wong	2	6	6^{4}
