= 2022 Indy Challenger – Doubles =

Doubles
- 2022 Indy Challenger

Final
- Champions: (Mexico) Hans Hach Verdugo (United States) Hunter Reese
- Runners-up: (India) Purav Raja (India) Divij Sharan
- Score: 7–6^{(7–3)}, 3–6, [10–7]

Events
Singles	Doubles
- Indy Challenger

This was the first edition of the tournament.

Hans Hach Verdugo and Hunter Reese won the title after defeating Purav Raja and Divij Sharan 7–6^{(7–3)}, 3–6, [10–7] in the final.

== Seeds ==
1. (Mexico) Hans Hach Verdugo / (United States) Hunter Reese (champions)
2. (India) Ramkumar Ramanathan / (Australia) John-Patrick Smith (quarterfinals)
3. (United States) Robert Galloway / (United States) Alex Lawson (semifinals)
4. (Chinese Taipei) Hsu Yu-hsiou / (Greece) Michail Pervolarakis (first round)

== Draw ==
Key

- Q = Qualifier
- WC = Wild card
- LL = Lucky loser
- Alt = Alternate
- ITF = ITF entry
- PR = Protected ranking
- SR = Special ranking
- SE = Special exempt
- JE = Junior exempt
- JR = Junior Accelerator Programme entrant
- CO = College Accelerator Programme entrant
- NG = Next Gen Accelerator Program entrant
- w/o = Walkover
- r = Retired
- d = Defaulted

First round
1	(Mexico) H Hach Verdugo (United States) H Reese	6	7^{7}
WC	(United States) N Basavareddy (United States) Patrick Fletchall	4	6^{4}
(France) E Couacaud (United States) C Eubanks	6	5	[11]
(United States) M Krueger (United States) A Rybakov	3	7	[9]
4	(Chinese Taipei) Y-h Hsu (Greece) M Pervolarakis	3	4
PR	(Japan) T Matsui (Japan) K Uesugi	6	6
(Netherlands) G Brouwer (Australia) A Harris	6	7
(Croatia) B Gojo (China) J Shang	2	5
WC	(United States) N Chappell (United States) K Smith	7^{7}	4	[11]
(Philippines) R Gonzales (United States) R Stalder	6^{4}	6	[13]
(Switzerland) L Margaroli (Japan) Y Uchiyama	5	3
3	(United States) R Galloway (United States) A Lawson	7	6
(India) P Raja (India) D Sharan	6	7
(Australia) R Hijikata (United States) N Monroe	2	5
(Lebanon) H Habib (Australia) L Tu	3	7^{8}	[6]
2	(India) R Ramanathan (Australia) J-P Smith	6	6^{6}	[10]

Quarterfinals
1	(Mexico) H Hach Verdugo (United States) H Reese	7^{8}	6^{2}	[10]
(France) E Couacaud (United States) C Eubanks	6^{6}	7^{7}	[7]
PR	(Japan) T Matsui (Japan) K Uesugi	7	6
(Netherlands) G Brouwer (Australia) A Harris	5	3
(Philippines) R Gonzales (United States) R Stalder	6	3	[8]
3	(United States) R Galloway (United States) A Lawson	3	6	[10]
(India) P Raja (India) D Sharan	6	6
2	(India) R Ramanathan (Australia) J-P Smith	4	4

Semifinals
1	(Mexico) H Hach Verdugo (United States) H Reese	7^{7}	7
PR	(Japan) T Matsui (Japan) K Uesugi	6^{3}	5
3	(United States) R Galloway (United States) A Lawson	6	3	[8]
(India) P Raja (India) D Sharan	3	6	[10]

Final
1	(Mexico) H Hach Verdugo (United States) H Reese	7^{7}	3	[10]
(India) P Raja (India) D Sharan	6^{3}	6	[7]
