= 2026 Tallahassee Tennis Challenger – Doubles =

Doubles
- 2026 Tallahassee Tennis Challenger

Final
- Champions: (United States) Stefan Dostanic (United States) Alex Rybakov
- Runners-up: (Canada) Cleeve Harper (United Kingdom) David Stevenson
- Score: 6–4, 6–2

Events
Singles	Doubles
- Tallahassee Tennis Challenger

Liam Draxl and Cleeve Harper were the defending champions but chose to defend their title with different partners. Draxl partnered Andy Andrade, but they withdrew before the tournament began. Harper partnered David Stevenson but lost in the final to Stefan Dostanic and Alex Rybakov.

Dostanic and Rybakov won the title after defeating Harper and Stevenson 6–4, 6–2 in the final.

== Seeds ==
1. (Canada) Cleeve Harper / (United Kingdom) David Stevenson (final)
2. (Bolivia) Boris Arias / (Denmark) Johannes Ingildsen (semifinals)
3. (United States) George Goldhoff / (Australia) Patrick Harper (first round)
4. (Venezuela) Luis David Martínez / (Colombia) Cristian Rodríguez (first round)

== Draw ==
Key

- Q = Qualifier
- WC = Wild card
- LL = Lucky loser
- Alt = Alternate
- ITF = ITF entry
- PR = Protected ranking
- SR = Special ranking
- SE = Special exempt
- JE = Junior exempt
- JR = Junior Accelerator Programme entrant
- CO = College Accelerator Programme entrant
- NG = Next Gen Accelerator Program entrant
- w/o = Walkover
- r = Retired
- d = Defaulted

First round
1	(Canada) C Harper (United Kingdom) D Stevenson	6	6
(United States) G Johns (United States) M Krueger	3	4
WC	(Australia) Alex Bulte (Algeria) Youcef Rihane	7^{8}	3	[5]
(Venezuela) Juan José Bianchi (United States) J Sheehy	6^{6}	6	[10]
3	(United States) G Goldhoff (Australia) P Harper	2	5
Alt	(United States) C Kingsley (United States) A Martin	6	7
(Argentina) FA Gómez (Argentina) N Kicker	6	6
(Antigua and Barbuda) J Maginley (United States) C Smith	3	3
(United States) S Dostanic (United States) A Rybakov	6	7
Alt	(Switzerland) K Feldbausch (Kazakhstan) D Popko	1	5
(Brazil) M Alves (Mexico) A Magadán	6	6^{7}	[10]
4	(Venezuela) LD Martínez (Colombia) C Rodríguez	4	7^{9}	[7]
(United Kingdom) S Duncan (Brazil) D Dutra da Silva	6	6
WC	(United States) K Hance (United States) J Kennedy	1	2
(Czech Republic) J Jermář (Poland) S Kielan	1	6^{4}
2	(Bolivia) B Arias (Denmark) J Ingildsen	6	7^{7}

Quarterfinals
1	(Canada) C Harper (United Kingdom) D Stevenson	7^{7}	7
(Venezuela) JJ Bianchi (United States) J Sheehy	6^{3}	5
Alt	(United States) C Kingsley (United States) A Martin	4	3
(Argentina) FA Gómez (Argentina) N Kicker	6	6
(United States) S Dostanic (United States) A Rybakov	4	6	[13]
(Brazil) M Alves (Mexico) A Magadán	6	2	[11]
(United Kingdom) S Duncan (Brazil) D Dutra da Silva	4	4
2	(Bolivia) B Arias (Denmark) J Ingildsen	6	6

Semifinals
1	(Canada) C Harper (United Kingdom) D Stevenson	6	6
(Argentina) FA Gómez (Argentina) N Kicker	3	3
(United States) S Dostanic (United States) A Rybakov	6	6
2	(Bolivia) B Arias (Denmark) J Ingildsen	3	1

Final
1	(Canada) C Harper (United Kingdom) D Stevenson	4	2
(United States) S Dostanic (United States) A Rybakov	6	6
