= 2023 Tyler Tennis Championships – Singles =

Singles
- 2023 Tyler Tennis Championships

Final
- Champion: (United States) Nicolas Moreno de Alboran
- Runner-up: (Kazakhstan) Mikhail Kukushkin
- Score: 6–7^{(8–10)}, 7–6^{(7–0)}, 6–4

Events
Singles	Doubles
- Tyler Tennis Championships

This was the first edition of the tournament.

Nicolas Moreno de Alboran won the title after defeating Mikhail Kukushkin 6–7^{(8–10)}, 7–6^{(7–0)}, 6–4 in the final.

== Seeds ==
1. (United States) Michael Mmoh (first round)
2. (Chinese Taipei) Wu Tung-lin (second round)
3. (United States) Nicolas Moreno de Alboran (champion)
4. (Australia) Marc Polmans (second round)
5. (France) Antoine Escoffier (first round)
6. (Tunisia) Aziz Dougaz (second round)
7. (Japan) Yasutaka Uchiyama (withdrew)
8. (Argentina) Juan Pablo Ficovich (first round)

== Draw ==
Key

- Q = Qualifier
- WC = Wild card
- LL = Lucky loser
- Alt = Alternate
- ITF = ITF entry
- PR = Protected ranking
- SR = Special ranking
- SE = Special exempt
- JE = Junior exempt
- JR = Junior Accelerator Programme entrant
- CO = College Accelerator Programme entrant
- NG = Next Gen Accelerator Program entrant
- w/o = Walkover
- r = Retired
- d = Defaulted

=== Finals ===
Semifinals
Q	(Germany) Peter Gojowczyk	1	2
3	(United States) Nicolas Moreno de Alboran	6	6
(Kazakhstan) Mikhail Kukushkin	6	4	6
(Canada) Alexis Galarneau	4	6	4

Final
3	(United States) Nicolas Moreno de Alboran	6^{8}	7^{7}	6
(Kazakhstan) Mikhail Kukushkin	7^{10}	6^{0}	4

=== Top half ===
First round
1	(United States) M Mmoh	3	6^{2}
LL	(United States) Christian Langmo	6	7^{7}
(Brazil) JL Reis da Silva	6	2	3
WC	(United States) A Neff	4	6	6
Q	(Germany) P Gojowczyk	7	6
(United States) B Kuzuhara	5	2
Alt	(Estonia) M Lajal	6	6
5	(France) A Escoffier	2	4
3	(United States) N Moreno de Alboran	6	6
(Canada) S Diez	2	3
(Germany) D Masur	6^{4}	6^{6}
WC	(United States) T-S Kwiatkowski	7^{7}	7^{8}
Q	(Australia) A Walton	6	3	6^{4}
(United States) T Sandgren	4	6	7^{7}
WC	(United States) O Kumar	4	2
Q	(United States) N Chappell	6	6

Second round
LL	(United States) C Langmo	6^{4}	6^{6}
WC	(United States) A Neff	7^{7}	7^{8}
Q	(Germany) P Gojowczyk	6	6
Alt	(Estonia) M Lajal	1	3
3	(United States) N Moreno de Alboran	6	6
WC	(United States) T-S Kwiatkowski	4	2
(United States) T Sandgren	6	6
Q	(United States) N Chappell	3	4

Quarterfinals
WC	(United States) A Neff	6	3	2
Q	(Germany) P Gojowczyk	3	6	6
3	(United States) N Moreno de Alboran	7	4	6
(United States) T Sandgren	5	6	3

Semifinals
Q	(Germany) P Gojowczyk	1	2
3	(United States) N Moreno de Alboran	6	6

=== Bottom half ===
First round
8	(Argentina) JP Ficovich	1	4
PR	(Australia) A Bolt	6	6
(Japan) Y Shimizu	6	6
Q	(Romania) M Copil	2	1
(Kazakhstan) D Yevseyev	6^{2}	2
(Kazakhstan) M Kukushkin	7^{7}	6
(Norway) V Durasovic	2	3
4	(Australia) M Polmans	6	6
6	(Tunisia) A Dougaz	7	6
SE	(Kazakhstan) B Zhukayev	5	2
(Tunisia) S Mansouri	6	6
Q	(Australia) D Sweeny	2	4
Q	(Brazil) G Heide	4	2
(Canada) A Galarneau	6	6
(United States) M Krueger	3	6	0
2	(Chinese Taipei) T-l Wu	6	3	6

Second round
PR	(Australia) A Bolt	6^{5}	3
(Japan) Y Shimizu	7^{7}	6
(Kazakhstan) M Kukushkin	2	6	6
4	(Australia) M Polmans	6	4	2
6	(Tunisia) A Dougaz	6^{4}	6	6^{10}
(Tunisia) S Mansouri	7^{7}	1	7^{12}
(Canada) A Galarneau	6	6^{8}	6
2	(Chinese Taipei) T-l Wu	2	7^{10}	4

Quarterfinals
(Japan) Y Shimizu	6	3	4
(Kazakhstan) M Kukushkin	4	6	6
(Tunisia) S Mansouri	3	5
(Canada) A Galarneau	6	7

Semifinals
(Kazakhstan) M Kukushkin	6	4	6
(Canada) A Galarneau	4	6	4
