= 2024 Savannah Challenger – Doubles =

Doubles
- 2024 Savannah Challenger

Final
- Champions: (United States) Christian Harrison (United Kingdom) Marcus Willis
- Runners-up: (Sweden) Simon Freund (Denmark) Johannes Ingildsen
- Score: 6–3, 6–3

Events
Singles	Doubles
- Savannah Challenger

William Blumberg and Luis David Martínez were the defending champions but only Martínez chose to defend his title, partnering Federico Agustín Gómez. He lost in the semifinals to Christian Harrison and Marcus Willis.

Harrison and Willis won the title after defeating Simon Freund and Johannes Ingildsen 6–3, 6–3 in the final.

== Seeds ==
1. (India) Arjun Kadhe / (India) Jeevan Nedunchezhiyan (semifinals)
2. (Argentina) Federico Agustín Gómez / (Venezuela) Luis David Martínez (semifinals)
3. (United States) Christian Harrison / (United Kingdom) Marcus Willis (champions)
4. (India) Niki Kaliyanda Poonacha / (United Kingdom) Joshua Paris (first round)

== Draw ==
Key

- Q = Qualifier
- WC = Wild card
- LL = Lucky loser
- Alt = Alternate
- ITF = ITF entry
- PR = Protected ranking
- SR = Special ranking
- SE = Special exempt
- JE = Junior exempt
- JR = Junior Accelerator Programme entrant
- CO = College Accelerator Programme entrant
- NG = Next Gen Accelerator Program entrant
- w/o = Walkover
- r = Retired
- d = Defaulted

=== Draw ===
First round
1	(India) A Kadhe (India) J Nedunchezhiyan	6	7
(Australia) T Fancutt (United States) H Reese	2	5
(United Kingdom) S Duncan (United States) A Rybakov	4	6	[2]
(United States) T-S Kwiatkowski (United States) A Lawson	6	4	[10]
4	(India) N Kaliyanda Poonacha (United Kingdom) J Paris	2	4
WC	(United States) T Boyer (United States) Tennyson Whiting	6	6
(India) A Chandrasekar (Mexico) H Hach Verdugo	1	6^{2}
(Sweden) S Freund (Denmark) J Ingildsen	6	7^{7}
(Canada) B Sigouin (Canada) K Stevenson	6	6^{2}	[1]
WC	(United States) S Kirchheimer (United States) T Kodat	2	7^{7}	[10]
Alt	(United States) Nicholas Bybel (United Kingdom) O Crawford	4	2
3	(United States) C Harrison (United Kingdom) M Willis	6	6
(Australia) O Jasika (New Zealand) A Rai	6	3	[4]
(United States) Mac Kiger (United States) M Krueger	4	6	[10]
(France) C Denolly (France) C Tabur	6	3	[8]
2	(Argentina) FA Gómez (Venezuela) LD Martínez	1	6	[10]

Quarterfinals
1	(India) A Kadhe (India) J Nedunchezhiyan	6	7
(United States) T-S Kwiatkowski (United States) A Lawson	3	5
WC	(United States) T Boyer (United States) T Whiting	5	1
(Sweden) S Freund (Denmark) J Ingildsen	7	6
WC	(United States) S Kirchheimer (United States) T Kodat	4	2
3	(United States) C Harrison (United Kingdom) M Willis	6	6
(United States) M Kiger (United States) M Krueger
2	(Argentina) FA Gómez (Venezuela) LD Martínez	w/o

Semifinals
1	(India) A Kadhe (India) J Nedunchezhiyan	6	3	[11]
(Sweden) S Freund (Denmark) J Ingildsen	2	6	[13]
3	(United States) C Harrison (United Kingdom) M Willis	6	3	[10]
2	(Argentina) FA Gómez (Venezuela) LD Martínez	3	6	[7]

Final
(Sweden) S Freund (Denmark) J Ingildsen	3	3
3	(United States) C Harrison (United Kingdom) M Willis	6	6
