= 2024 Savannah Challenger =

- Date: 22 – 28 April
- Edition: 14th
- Surface: Green clay
- Location: Savannah, Georgia, United States

Champions

Singles
- (Switzerland) Alexander Ritschard

Doubles
- (United States) Christian Harrison / (United Kingdom) Marcus Willis
- Savannah Challenger

The 2024 Savannah Challenger was a professional tennis tournament played on clay courts. It was the 14th edition of the tournament which was part of the 2024 ATP Challenger Tour. It took place in Savannah, Georgia, United States between April 22 and April 28, 2024.

== Singles main-draw entrants ==
=== Seeds ===
Country	Player	Rank^{1}	Seed
USA	J. J. Wolf	102	1
USA	Michael Mmoh	111	2
USA	Patrick Kypson	143	3
USA	Denis Kudla	163	4
SUI	Alexander Ritschard	195	5
USA	Tristan Boyer	201	6
GBR	Oliver Crawford	202	7
FRA	Clément Tabur	203	8

- ^{1} Rankings are as of April 15, 2024.

=== Other entrants ===
The following players received wildcards into the singles main draw:

- (United States) Strong Kirchheimer
- (United States) Stefan Kozlov
- (United States) Bruno Kuzuhara

The following players received entry into the singles main draw as alternates:

- (Lebanon) Hady Habib
- (United States) Aidan Mayo
- (Australia) Bernard Tomic

The following players received entry from the qualifying draw:

- (Ecuador) Andrés Andrade
- (Romania) Gabi Adrian Boitan
- (Norway) Viktor Durasovic
- (France) Arthur Géa
- (Argentina) Federico Agustín Gómez
- (United States) Tristan McCormick

== Champions ==
=== Singles ===
- (Switzerland) Alexander Ritschard def. (Ecuador) Andrés Andrade 6–2, 6–4.

=== Doubles ===
- (United States) Christian Harrison / (United Kingdom) Marcus Willis def. (Sweden) Simon Freund / (Denmark) Johannes Ingildsen 6–3, 6–3.
