= 2026 Open Aix Provence =

- Date: 28 April – 3 May
- Edition: 13th
- Surface: Clay
- Location: Aix-en-Provence, France

Champions

Singles
- (Chile) Alejandro Tabilo

Doubles
- (United States) Robert Cash / (United States) JJ Tracy
- Open Aix Provence

The 2026 Open Aix Provence (also known as the Open Aix Provence Crédit Agricole for sponsorship reasons) was a professional tennis tournament played on clay courts. It was the 13th edition of the tournament and an ATP Challenger Tour 175 event on the 2026 ATP Challenger Tour. It took place in Aix-en-Provence, France between 28 April and 3 May 2026.

== Singles main-draw entrants ==
=== Seeds ===
| Country | Player | Rank^{1} | Seed |
|---|---|---|---|
| USA | Alex Michelsen | 37 | 1 |
| CHI | Alejandro Tabilo | 43 | 2 |
| BEL | Zizou Bergs | 44 | 3 |
| USA | Ethan Quinn | 48 | 4 |
| PER | Ignacio Buse | 58 | 5 |
| FRA | Valentin Royer | 72 | 6 |
| KAZ | Alexander Shevchenko | 82 | 7 |
| AUT | Sebastian Ofner | 83 | 8 |

- ^{1} Rankings as of 20 April 2026.

=== Other entrants ===
The following players received wildcards into the singles main draw:

- (Bulgaria) Grigor Dimitrov
- (France) Daniel Jade
- (Switzerland) Stan Wawrinka

The following players received entry into the singles main draw as alternates:

- (France) Dan Added
- (Switzerland) Rémy Bertola
- (France) Clément Chidekh
- (Belgium) David Goffin
- (Serbia) Dušan Lajović

The following players received entry from the qualifying draw:

- (Belgium) Kimmer Coppejans
- (France) Thomas Faurel
- (France) Sascha Gueymard Wayenburg
- (Spain) Pol Martín Tiffon

The following player received entry as a lucky loser:

- (France) Pierre-Hugues Herbert

== Champions ==
=== Singles ===
- (Chile) Alejandro Tabilo def. (Belgium) Zizou Bergs 6–4, 4–6, 6–3.

=== Doubles ===
- (United States) Robert Cash / (United States) JJ Tracy def. (United States) Vasil Kirkov / (Netherlands) Bart Stevens 5–7, 6–4, [10–4].
