= 2026 Tyler Tennis Championships – Doubles =

Doubles
- 2026 Tyler Tennis Championships

Final
- Champions: (India) Rithvik Choudary Bollipalli (India) Ramkumar Ramanathan
- Runners-up: (United States) Zachary Fuchs (United States) Wally Thayne
- Score: 7–6^{(7–2)}, 7–6^{(7–4)}

Events
Singles	Doubles
- Tyler Tennis Championships

Finn Reynolds and James Watt were the defending champions but chose not to defend their title.

Rithvik Choudary Bollipalli and Ramkumar Ramanathan won the title after defeating Zachary Fuchs and Wally Thayne 7–6^{(7–2)}, 7–6^{(7–4)} in the final.

== Seeds ==
1. (India) Rithvik Choudary Bollipalli / (India) Ramkumar Ramanathan (champions)
2. (Australia) Patrick Harper / (United States) Daniel Milavsky (quarterfinals)
3. (Venezuela) Luis David Martínez / (Germany) Daniel Masur (quarterfinals)
4. (Australia) Kody Pearson / (Australia) Calum Puttergill (semifinals)

== Draw ==
Key

- Q = Qualifier
- WC = Wild card
- LL = Lucky loser
- Alt = Alternate
- ITF = ITF entry
- PR = Protected ranking
- SR = Special ranking
- SE = Special exempt
- JE = Junior exempt
- JR = Junior Accelerator Programme entrant
- CO = College Accelerator Programme entrant
- NG = Next Gen Accelerator Program entrant
- w/o = Walkover
- r = Retired
- d = Defaulted

First round
1	(India) RC Bollipalli (India) R Ramanathan	7	1	[10]
(United States) A Fenty (Venezuela) B Pérez	5	6	[6]
Alt	(Barbados) D King (Barbados) Stephen Slocombe	0	7	[9]
(Japan) M Imamura (Japan) H Matsuoka	6	5	[11]
3	(Venezuela) LD Martínez (Germany) D Masur	w/o
WC	(United States) William Manning (United States) B Shick
(Canada) D Martin (United States) Q Vandecasteele	6	5	[5]
(China) F Sun (Japan) S Watanabe	3	7	[10]
(Argentina) Valentín Basel (Brazil) Bruno Oliveira	w/o
(Colombia) N Mejía (Colombia) A Soriano Barrera
WC	(United States) B Kuzuhara (United States) Christian Langmo	4	6	[5]
4	(Australia) K Pearson (Australia) C Puttergill	6	4	[10]
(United States) Zachary Fuchs (United States) Wally Thayne	6	3	[10]
(Antigua and Barbuda) J Maginley (United States) B Suarez	4	6	[6]
(United States) P Kumar (United States) K Poling	2	1
2	(Australia) P Harper (United States) D Milavsky	6	6

Quarterfinals
1	(India) RC Bollipalli (India) R Ramanathan	6	6
(Japan) M Imamura (Japan) H Matsuoka	1	2
3	(Venezuela) LD Martínez (Germany) D Masur	7^{7}	4	[5]
(China) F Sun (Japan) S Watanabe	6^{4}	6	[10]
(Argentina) V Basel (Brazil) B Oliveira	6	6^{5}	[5]
4	(Australia) K Pearson (Australia) C Puttergill	4	7^{7}	[10]
(United States) Z Fuchs (United States) W Thayne	7^{7}	7
2	(Australia) P Harper (United States) D Milavsky	6^{5}	5

Semifinals
1	(India) RC Bollipalli (India) R Ramanathan	6	6
(China) F Sun (Japan) S Watanabe	3	2
4	(Australia) K Pearson (Australia) C Puttergill	6^{5}	6^{4}
(United States) Z Fuchs (United States) W Thayne	7^{7}	7^{7}

Final
1	(India) RC Bollipalli (India) R Ramanathan	7^{7}	7^{7}
(United States) Z Fuchs (United States) W Thayne	6^{2}	6^{4}
