= 2022 Indy Challenger – Singles =

Singles
- 2022 Indy Challenger

Final
- Champion: (China) Wu Yibing
- Runner-up: (United States) Aleksandar Kovacevic
- Score: 6–7^{(10–12)}, 7–6^{(15–13)}, 6–3

Events
Singles	Doubles
Indy Challenger	· 2023 →

Wu Yibing defeated Aleksandar Kovacevic in the final, 6–7^{(10–12)}, 7–6^{(15–13)}, 6–3, to win the singles tennis title at the 2022 Indy Challenger. Wu saved six championship points en route to his third consecutive title on the 2022 ATP Challenger Tour.

This was the first edition of the tournament.

== Seeds ==
1. (Germany) Peter Gojowczyk (second round)
2. (Netherlands) Tim van Rijthoven (second round, retired)
3. (United States) Stefan Kozlov (first round)
4. (United States) J. J. Wolf (first round)
5. (Germany) Dominik Koepfer (quarterfinals)
6. (United Kingdom) Liam Broady (first round)
7. (United States) Mitchell Krueger (first round)
8. (United States) Christopher Eubanks (quarterfinals)

== Draw ==
=== Key ===
- Q = Qualifier
- WC = Wild card
- LL = Lucky loser
- Alt = Alternate
- SE = Special exempt
- PR = Protected ranking
- ITF = ITF entry
- JE = Junior exempt
- w/o = Walkover
- r = Retired
- d = Defaulted
- SR = Special ranking

=== Finals ===
Semifinals
SE	(China) Wu Yibing	7	6
(Japan) Yasutaka Uchiyama	5	3
Alt	(United States) Aleksandar Kovacevic	6	7
SE	(United States) Ben Shelton	4	5

Final
SE	(China) Wu Yibing	6^{10}	7^{15}	6
Alt	(United States) Aleksandar Kovacevic	7^{12}	6^{13}	3

=== Top half ===
First round
1	(Germany) P Gojowczyk	7^{7}	7^{7}
WC	(United States) N Basavareddy	6^{4}	6^{3}
SE	(China) Y Wu	7^{7}	6
Q	(Lebanon) H Habib	6^{2}	2
(Japan) Yo Watanuki	3	3
(Canada) A Galarneau	6	6
WC	(United States) A Rybakov	7^{12}	7
7	(United States) M Krueger	6^{10}	5
4	(United States) J. J. Wolf	4	7^{7}	6^{1}
LL	(United Kingdom) B Harris	6	6^{1}	7^{7}
(Japan) Y Uchiyama	4	6	6
(India) R Ramanathan	6	4	1
Q	(China) J Shang	4	7^{7}	6
Q	(United States) B Holt	6	6^{1}	3
(Netherlands) G Brouwer	4	2
8	(United States) C Eubanks	6	6

Second round
1	(Germany) P Gojowczyk	4	2
SE	(China) Y Wu	6	6
(Canada) A Galarneau	4	7	3
WC	(United States) A Rybakov	6	5	6
LL	(United Kingdom) B Harris	4	6^{7}
(Japan) Y Uchiyama	6	7^{9}
Q	(China) J Shang	5	3
8	(United States) C Eubanks	7	6

Quarterfinals
SE	(China) Y Wu	6	6
WC	(United States) A Rybakov	3	3
(Japan) Y Uchiyama	7^{7}	6^{4}	6
8	(United States) C Eubanks	6^{3}	7^{7}	4

Semifinals
SE	(China) Y Wu	7	6
(Japan) Y Uchiyama	5	3

=== Bottom half ===
First round
5	(Germany) D Koepfer	6	6
(France) E Couacaud	1	3
WC	(Greece) M Pervolarakis	4	3
Alt	(Australia) L Tu	6	6
Q	(Japan) S Shimabukuro	6	6
(United States) B Fratangelo	4	3
Alt	(United States) A Kovacevic	6	6^{4}	6
3	(United States) S Kozlov	3	7^{7}	4
6	(United Kingdom) L Broady	2	2
(Australia) M Purcell	6	6
Q	(United Kingdom) A McHugh	7	6
(Croatia) B Gojo	5	2
SE	(United States) B Shelton	6	6
(Australia) R Hijikata	3	4
Q	(United States) E Zhu	7^{7}	6^{5}	6^{3}
2	(Netherlands) T van Rijthoven	6^{2}	7^{7}	7^{7}

Second round
5	(Germany) D Koepfer	6	6
Alt	(Australia) L Tu	2	3
Q	(Japan) S Shimabukuro	3	4
Alt	(United States) A Kovacevic	6	6
(Australia) M Purcell	6^{5}	6	6
Q	(United Kingdom) A McHugh	7^{7}	3	4
SE	(United States) B Shelton	6^{7}	1
2	(Netherlands) T van Rijthoven	7^{9}	2^{r}

Quarterfinals
5	(Germany) D Koepfer	5	6^{5}
Alt	(United States) A Kovacevic	7	7^{7}
(Australia) M Purcell	6^{5}	4
SE	(United States) B Shelton	7^{7}	6

Semifinals
Alt	(United States) A Kovacevic	6	7
SE	(United States) B Shelton	4	5
