= 2026 Tyler Tennis Championships =

- Date: 1 – 7 June
- Edition: 4th
- Surface: Hard
- Location: Tyler, Texas, United States

Champions

Singles
- (Australia) Adam Walton

Doubles
- (India) Rithvik Choudary Bollipalli / (India) Ramkumar Ramanathan
- Tyler Tennis Championships

The 2026 Texas Spine and Joint Men's Championships was a professional tennis tournament played on hardcourts. It was the fourth edition of the tournament which was part of the 2026 ATP Challenger Tour. It took place in Tyler, Texas, United States between June 1 and June 7, 2026.

== Singles main-draw entrants ==
=== Seeds ===
Country	Player	Rank^{1}	Seed
AUS	Adam Walton	97	1
AUS	Dane Sweeny	131	2
CAN	Liam Draxl	164	3
COL	Nicolás Mejía	169	4
USA	Colton Smith	185	5
AUS	Bernard Tomic	194	6
ECU	Andy Andrade	223	7
LTU	Edas Butvilas	232	8

- ^{1} Rankings are as of 25 May 2026.

=== Other entrants ===
The following players received wildcards into the singles main draw:

- (United States) Landon Ardila
- (United States) Sebastian Gorzny
- (United States) Trevor Svajda

The following players received entry into the singles main draw using protected rankings:

- (Australia) Blake Ellis
- (United States) Aidan Mayo

The following player received entry into the singles main draw through the College Accelerator programme:

- (France) Timo Legout

The following player received entry into the singles main draw through the Next Gen Accelerator programme:

- (United Kingdom) Henry Searle

The following player received entry into the singles main draw as an alternate:

- (Japan) Yuta Shimizu

The following players received entry from the qualifying draw:

- (United States) Andrew Fenty
- (Japan) Masamichi Imamura
- (United States) Aidan Kim
- (United States) Daniel Milavsky
- (United States) Karl Poling
- (United States) Braden Shick

The following player received entry as a lucky loser:

- (Japan) Hayato Matsuoka

== Champions ==
=== Singles ===
- (Australia) Adam Walton def. (United States) Andre Ilagan 7–5, 6–1.

=== Doubles ===
- (India) Rithvik Choudary Bollipalli / (India) Ramkumar Ramanathan def. (United States) Zachary Fuchs / (United States) Wally Thayne 7–6^{(7–2)}, 7–6^{(7–4)}.
