= 2026 Open Aix Provence – Doubles =

Doubles
- 2026 Open Aix Provence

Final
- Champions: (United States) Robert Cash (United States) JJ Tracy
- Runners-up: (United States) Vasil Kirkov (Netherlands) Bart Stevens
- Score: 5–7, 6–4, [10–4]

Events
| Singles | Doubles |
- Open Aix Provence

Robert Cash and JJ Tracy were the defending champions and successfully defended their title after defeating Vasil Kirkov and Bart Stevens 5–7, 6–4, [10–4] in the final.

== Seeds ==
1. (United States) Robert Cash / (United States) JJ Tracy (champions)
2. (Germany) Jakob Schnaitter / (Germany) Mark Wallner (quarterfinals)
3. (United States) Robert Galloway / (Australia) John Peers (quarterfinals)
4. (United States) Vasil Kirkov / (Netherlands) Bart Stevens (final)

== Draw ==
Key

- Q = Qualifier
- WC = Wild card
- LL = Lucky loser
- Alt = Alternate
- ITF = ITF entry
- PR = Protected ranking
- SR = Special ranking
- SE = Special exempt
- JE = Junior exempt
- JR = Junior Accelerator Programme entrant
- CO = College Accelerator Programme entrant
- NG = Next Gen Accelerator Program entrant
- w/o = Walkover
- r = Retired
- d = Defaulted

First round
1 | (United States) R Cash (United States) JJ Tracy | 6 | 6
(France) R Bertrand (France) M Martineau | 2 | 2
3 | (United States) R Galloway (Australia) J Peers | 7^{7} | 6^{6} | [10]
(France) C Chidekh (France) V Royer | 6^{1} | 7^{8} | [7]
(Switzerland) J Paul (Czech Republic) M Vocel | 6 | 6
WC | (France) F Martin (France) A Müller | 3 | 3
(United States) P Trhac (United Kingdom) M Willis | 6 | 3 | [10]
WC | (Brazil) PA Saraiva dos Santos (France) A Weber | 3 | 6 | [6]
(France) A Reymond (France) L Sanchez | 7 | 4 | [8]
4 | (United States) V Kirkov (Netherlands) B Stevens | 5 | 6 | [10]
(France) P-H Herbert (Australia) R Hijikata | 6^{1} | 4
(Chinese Taipei) R Ho (Germany) H Jebens | 7^{7} | 6
(Switzerland) R Bertola (France) G Jacq | 6 | 4 | [6]
2 | (Germany) J Schnaitter (Germany) M Wallner | 4 | 6 | [10]

Quarterfinals
1 | (United States) R Cash (United States) JJ Tracy | 7^{7} | 6^{4} | [10]
(Australia) B Bayldon (Netherlands) M Veldheer | 6^{4} | 7^{7} | [8]
3 | (United States) R Galloway (Australia) J Peers | 0 | 1
(Switzerland) J Paul (Czech Republic) M Vocel | 6 | 6
(United States) P Trhac (United Kingdom) M Willis | 1 | 5
4 | (United States) V Kirkov (Netherlands) B Stevens | 6 | 7
(Chinese Taipei) R Ho (Germany) H Jebens | 3 | 7^{7} | [10]
2 | (Germany) J Schnaitter (Germany) M Wallner | 6 | 6^{4} | [8]

Semifinals
1 | (United States) R Cash (United States) JJ Tracy | 6 | 7^{9}
(Switzerland) J Paul (Czech Republic) M Vocel | 4 | 6^{7}
4 | (United States) V Kirkov (Netherlands) B Stevens | 6 | 7
(Chinese Taipei) R Ho (Germany) H Jebens | 4 | 5

Final
1 | (United States) R Cash (United States) JJ Tracy | 5 | 6 | [10]
4 | (United States) V Kirkov (Netherlands) B Stevens | 7 | 4 | [4]
