= 2022 Indy Challenger =

- Date: 18–24 July
- Edition: 1st
- Surface: Hard (indoor)
- Location: Indianapolis, United States

Champions

Singles
- (China) Wu Yibing

Doubles
- (Mexico) Hans Hach Verdugo / (United States) Hunter Reese
Indy Challenger	· 2023 →

The 2022 Indy Challenger was a professional tennis tournament played on indoor hard courts. It was the first edition of the tournament which was part of the 2022 ATP Challenger Tour. It took place in Indianapolis, United States between 18 and 24 July 2022.

== Singles main draw entrants ==
=== Seeds ===
Country	Player	Rank^{1}	Seed
GER	Peter Gojowczyk	91	1
NED	Tim van Rijthoven	103	2
USA	Stefan Kozlov	104	3
USA	J. J. Wolf	111	4
GER	Dominik Koepfer	136	5
GBR	Liam Broady	140	6
USA	Mitchell Krueger	146	7
USA	Christopher Eubanks	163	8

- ^{1} Rankings as of July 11, 2022.

=== Other entrants ===
The following players received wildcards into the singles main draw:

- (United States) Nishesh Basavareddy
- (Greece) Michail Pervolarakis
- (United States) Alex Rybakov

The following player received entry into the singles main draw using a protected ranking:

- (Australia) ~~Andrew Harris~~

The following players received entry into the singles main draw as special exempts:

- (United States) Ben Shelton
- (China) Wu Yibing

The following players received entry into the singles main draw as alternates:

- (United States) Aleksandar Kovacevic
- (Australia) Li Tu

The following players received entry from the qualifying draw:

- (Lebanon) Hady Habib
- (United States) Brandon Holt
- (United Kingdom) Aidan McHugh
- (China) Shang Juncheng
- (Japan) Sho Shimabukuro
- (United States) Evan Zhu

The following player received entry as a lucky loser:

- (United Kingdom) Billy Harris

== Champions ==
=== Singles ===
- (China) Wu Yibing def. (United States) Aleksandar Kovacevic 6–7^{(10–12)}, 7–6^{(15–13)}, 6–3.

=== Doubles ===
- (Mexico) Hans Hach Verdugo / (United States) Hunter Reese def. (India) Purav Raja / (India) Divij Sharan 7–6^{(7–3)}, 3–6, [10–7].
