= 2024 Tyler Tennis Championships – Doubles =

Doubles
- 2024 Tyler Tennis Championships

Final
- Champions: (Mexico) Hans Hach Verdugo (Japan) James Trotter
- Runners-up: (Ecuador) Andrés Andrade (Jordan) Abdullah Shelbayh
- Score: 7–6^{(7–3)}, 6–4

Events
Singles	Doubles
- Tyler Tennis Championships

Alex Bolt and Andrew Harris were the defending champions but chose not to defend their title.

James Trotter and Hans Hach Verdugo won the title after defeating Andrés Andrade and Abdullah Shelbayh 7–6^{(7–3)}, 6–4 in the final.

== Seeds ==
1. (United Kingdom) Joshua Paris / (India) Ramkumar Ramanathan (first round)
2. (Mexico) Hans Hach Verdugo / (Japan) James Trotter (champions)
3. (United States) Mac Kiger / (United States) Mitchell Krueger (quarterfinals)
4. (United States) Thai-Son Kwiatkowski / (United States) Alex Lawson (first round)

== Draw ==
Key

- Q = Qualifier
- WC = Wild card
- LL = Lucky loser
- Alt = Alternate
- ITF = ITF entry
- PR = Protected ranking
- SR = Special ranking
- SE = Special exempt
- JE = Junior exempt
- JR = Junior Accelerator Programme entrant
- CO = College Accelerator Programme entrant
- NG = Next Gen Accelerator Program entrant
- w/o = Walkover
- r = Retired
- d = Defaulted

=== Draw ===
First round
1	(United Kingdom) J Paris (India) R Ramanathan	6	4	[8]
(Northern Mariana Islands) C Sinclair (Hong Kong) C Wong	3	6	[10]
(Colombia) N Mejía (Colombia) A Urrea	7^{7}	4	[10]
PR	(United States) B Kuzuhara (United States) D Novikov	6^{4}	6	[8]
4	(United States) T-S Kwiatkowski (United States) A Lawson	6	2	[5]
WC	(United States) A Rybakov (United States) J Sheehy	4	6	[10]
(Ecuador) A Andrade (Jordan) A Shelbayh	7	1	[10]
WC	(United States) P Kumar; Ilgiz Valiev	5	6	[7]
(Jamaica) B Bicknell (United States) C Kingsley	2	2
(Australia) P Harper (United Kingdom) D Stevenson	6	6
(Israel) R Stepanov (Canada) K Stevenson	4	1
3	(United States) M Kiger (United States) M Krueger	6	6
(Chinese Taipei) Y-h Hsu (Japan) Y Shimizu	7	6
PR	(South Korea) S-c Hong (Japan) Shintaro Imai	5	4
(Canada) L Draxl (Canada) B Sigouin	6^{6}	6	[6]
2	(Mexico) H Hach Verdugo (Japan) J Trotter	7^{8}	4	[10]

Quarterfinals
(Northern Mariana Islands) C Sinclair (Hong Kong) C Wong	6	6
(Colombia) N Mejía (Colombia) A Urrea	4	4
WC	(United States) A Rybakov (United States) J Sheehy	2	6	[7]
(Ecuador) A Andrade (Jordan) A Shelbayh	6	3	[10]
(Australia) P Harper (United Kingdom) D Stevenson	6	6
3	(United States) M Kiger (United States) M Krueger	4	4
(Chinese Taipei) Y-h Hsu (Japan) Y Shimizu
2	(Mexico) H Hach Verdugo (Japan) J Trotter	w/o

Semifinals
(Northern Mariana Islands) C Sinclair (Hong Kong) C Wong	3	6	[10]
(Ecuador) A Andrade (Jordan) A Shelbayh	6	3	[12]
(Australia) P Harper (United Kingdom) D Stevenson	4	6^{3}
2	(Mexico) H Hach Verdugo (Japan) J Trotter	6	7^{7}

Final
(Ecuador) A Andrade (Jordan) A Shelbayh	6^{3}	4
2	(Mexico) H Hach Verdugo (Japan) J Trotter	7^{7}	6
