= 2026 Tallahassee Tennis Challenger =

- Date: 13–19 April
- Edition: 26th
- Surface: Green clay
- Location: Tallahassee, Florida, United States

Champions

Singles
- (France) Clément Tabur

Doubles
- (United States) Stefan Dostanic / (United States) Alex Rybakov
- Tallahassee Tennis Challenger

The 2026 Tallahassee Tennis Challenger was a professional tennis tournament played on green clay courts. It was the 26th edition of the tournament which was part of the 2026 ATP Challenger Tour. It took place in Tallahassee, Florida, United States between April 13 and April 19, 2026.

== Singles main-draw entrants ==
=== Seeds ===
Country	Player	Rank^{1}	Seed
CAN	Liam Draxl	144	1
ARG	Federico Agustín Gómez	173	2
~~USA~~	~~Nishesh Basavareddy~~	~~181~~	~~3~~
EST	Daniil Glinka	184	4
FRA	Clément Tabur	187	5
USA	Colton Smith	193	6
AUT	Lukas Neumayer	194	7
ARG	Genaro Alberto Olivieri	197	8

- ^{1} Rankings as of April 6, 2026.

=== Other entrants ===
The following players received wildcards into the singles main draw:

- (United States) Kaylan Bigun
- (United States) Cannon Kingsley
- (United States) Michael Mmoh

The following player received entry into the singles main draw through the College Accelerator programme:

- (United States) Stefan Dostanic

The following player received entry into the singles main draw through the Junior Accelerator programme:

- (United States) Jack Kennedy

The following players received entry into the singles main draw as alternates:

- (Croatia) Duje Ajduković
- (Georgia (country)) Saba Purtseladze
- (United States) Alex Rybakov

The following players received entry from the qualifying draw:

- (Czech Republic) Hynek Bartoň
- (United States) Garrett Johns
- (United States) Stefan Kozlov
- (United States) Bruno Kuzuhara
- (United States) Christian Langmo
- (United States) Tyler Zink

The following player received entry as a lucky loser:

- (Brazil) Daniel Dutra da Silva

== Champions ==
=== Singles ===
- (France) Clément Tabur def. (Brazil) João Lucas Reis da Silva 6–4, 1–0 ret.

=== Doubles ===
- (United States) Stefan Dostanic / (United States) Alex Rybakov def. (Canada) Cleeve Harper / (United Kingdom) David Stevenson 6–4, 6–2.
