= 2024 Tyler Tennis Championships =

- Date: 3 – 9 June
- Edition: 2nd
- Surface: Hard
- Location: Tyler, Texas, United States

Champions

Singles
- (Japan) James Trotter

Doubles
- (Mexico) Hans Hach Verdugo / (Japan) James Trotter
- Tyler Tennis Championships

The 2024 Tyler Tennis Championships was a professional tennis tournament played on hardcourts. It was the second edition of the tournament which was part of the 2024 ATP Challenger Tour. It took place in Tyler, Texas, United States between June 3 and June 9, 2024.

== Singles main-draw entrants ==
=== Seeds ===
Country	Player	Rank^{1}	Seed
CAN	Alexis Galarneau	153	1
HKG	Coleman Wong	181	2
KOR	Hong Seong-chan	191	3
TPE	Hsu Yu-hsiou	229	4
~~AUS~~	~~Bernard Tomic~~	~~247~~	~~5~~
JOR	Abdullah Shelbayh	248	6
USA	Mitchell Krueger	251	7
CAN	Liam Draxl	263	8

- ^{1} Rankings are as of 27 May 2024.

=== Other entrants ===
The following players received wildcards into the singles main draw:

- (United States) Bruno Kuzuhara
- (United States) Rudy Quan
- (United States) Trevor Svajda

The following players received entry into the singles main draw as alternates:

- (United States) Stefan Kozlov
- (Japan) Yusuke Takahashi

The following players received entry from the qualifying draw:

- (Australia) Moerani Bouzige
- (Mexico) Ernesto Escobedo
- (United States) Strong Kirchheimer
- (United States) Christian Langmo
- (Poland) Filip Peliwo
- (United States) Ethan Quinn

The following player received entry as a lucky loser:

- (Sweden) Leo Borg

== Champions ==
=== Singles ===
- (Japan) James Trotter def. (United States) Brandon Holt 6–2, 7–6^{(7–3)}.

=== Doubles ===
- (Mexico) Hans Hach Verdugo / (Japan) James Trotter def. (Ecuador) Andrés Andrade / (Jordan) Abdullah Shelbayh 7–6^{(7–3)}, 6–4.
