= 2023 Tyler Tennis Championships =

- Date: 5 – 11 June
- Edition: 1st
- Surface: Hard
- Location: Tyler, Texas, United States

Champions

Singles
- (United States) Nicolas Moreno de Alboran

Doubles
- (Australia) Alex Bolt / (Australia) Andrew Harris
- Tyler Tennis Championships

The 2023 Tyler Tennis Championships was a professional tennis tournament played on hardcourts. It was the 1st edition of the tournament which was part of the 2023 ATP Challenger Tour. It took place in Tyler, Texas, United States between June 5 and June 11, 2023.

== Singles main-draw entrants ==
=== Seeds ===
Country	Player	Rank^{1}	Seed
USA	Michael Mmoh	123	1
TPE	Wu Tung-lin	182	2
USA	Nicolas Moreno de Alboran	187	3
AUS	Marc Polmans	194	4
FRA	Antoine Escoffier	202	5
TUN	Aziz Dougaz	220	6
~~JPN~~	~~Yasutaka Uchiyama~~	~~226~~	~~7~~
ARG	Juan Pablo Ficovich	228	8

- ^{1} Rankings are as of 29 May 2023.

=== Other entrants ===
The following players received wildcards into the singles main draw:

- (United States) Omni Kumar
- (United States) Thai-Son Kwiatkowski
- (United States) Adam Neff

The following player received entry into the singles main draw using a protected ranking:

- (Australia) Alex Bolt

The following player received entry into the singles main draw as a special exempt:

- (Kazakhstan) Beibit Zhukayev

The following player received entry into the singles main draw as an alternate:

- (Estonia) Mark Lajal

The following players received entry from the qualifying draw:

- (United States) Nick Chappell
- (Romania) Marius Copil
- (Germany) Peter Gojowczyk
- (Brazil) Gustavo Heide
- (Australia) Dane Sweeny
- (Australia) Adam Walton

The following player received entry as a lucky loser:

- (United States) Christian Langmo

== Champions ==
=== Singles ===
- (United States) Nicolas Moreno de Alboran def. (Kazakhstan) Mikhail Kukushkin 6–7^{(8–10)}, 7–6^{(7–0)}, 6–4.

=== Doubles ===
- (Australia) Alex Bolt / (Australia) Andrew Harris def. (United States) Evan King / (United States) Reese Stalder 6–1, 6–4.
