= 2026 Open Aix Provence – Singles =

Singles
- 2026 Open Aix Provence

Final
- Champion: (Chile) Alejandro Tabilo
- Runner-up: (Belgium) Zizou Bergs
- Score: 6–4, 4–6, 6–3

Events
Singles	Doubles
- Open Aix Provence

Borna Ćorić was the defending champion but chose not to defend his title.

Alejandro Tabilo won the title after defeating Zizou Bergs 6–4, 4–6, 6–3 in the final.

== Seeds ==
The top four seeds received a bye into the second round.

1. (United States) Alex Michelsen (second round)
2. (Chile) Alejandro Tabilo (champion)
3. (Belgium) Zizou Bergs (final)
4. (United States) Ethan Quinn (semifinals)
5. (Peru) Ignacio Buse (quarterfinals)
6. (France) Valentin Royer (second round)
7. (Kazakhstan) Alexander Shevchenko (second round)
8. (Austria) Sebastian Ofner (second round)

== Draw ==
Key

- Q = Qualifier
- WC = Wild card
- LL = Lucky loser
- Alt = Alternate
- ITF = ITF entry
- PR = Protected ranking
- SR = Special ranking
- SE = Special exempt
- JE = Junior exempt
- JR = Junior Accelerator Programme entrant
- CO = College Accelerator Programme entrant
- NG = Next Gen Accelerator Program entrant
- w/o = Walkover
- r = Retired
- d = Defaulted

=== Finals ===
Semifinals
Q	(Spain) Pol Martín Tiffon	3	4
3	(Belgium) Zizou Bergs	6	6
4	(United States) Ethan Quinn	3	6	6^{2}
2	(Chile) Alejandro Tabilo	6	3	7^{7}

Final
3	(Belgium) Zizou Bergs	4	6	3
2	(Chile) Alejandro Tabilo	6	4	6

=== Top half ===
First round
WC	(Bulgaria) G Dimitrov	3	4
Q	(Spain) P Martín Tiffon	6	6
Alt	(Switzerland) R Bertola	4	5
Q	(Belgium) K Coppejans	6	7
(Spain) P Martínez	2	3
6	(France) V Royer	6	6
LL	(France) P-H Herbert	7^{7}	6
Alt	(Serbia) D Lajović	6^{2}	3
Alt	(France) C Chidekh	3	3
(Australia) R Hijikata	6	6
WC	(Switzerland) S Wawrinka	3	4
8	(Austria) S Ofner	6	6

Second round
1	(United States) A Michelsen	4	6	3
Q	(Spain) P Martín Tiffon	6	3	6
Q	(Belgium) K Coppejans	6	7^{10}
6	(France) V Royer	4	6^{8}
3	(Belgium) Z Bergs	6	6
LL	(France) P-H Herbert	4	3
(Australia) R Hijikata	6	2	7^{7}
8	(Austria) S Ofner	4	6	6^{5}

Quarterfinals
Q	(Spain) P Martín Tiffon	7^{9}	6
Q	(Belgium) K Coppejans	6^{7}	4
3	(Belgium) Z Bergs	5	6	6
(Australia) R Hijikata	7	2	2

Semifinals
Q	(Spain) P Martín Tiffon	3	4
3	(Belgium) Z Bergs	6	6

=== Bottom half ===
First round
7	(Kazakhstan) A Shevchenko	6	6
Alt	(France) D Added	2	2
(China) Y Wu	6	6
(France) A Müller	3	4
WC	(France) Daniel Jade	6	1	3
(Spain) M Landaluce	4	6	6
5	(Peru) I Buse	7^{7}	6
(Argentina) F Comesaña	6^{4}	3
Q	(France) T Faurel	6	6
Alt	(Belgium) D Goffin	1	4
(Spain) R Bautista Agut	7	6
Q	(France) S Gueymard Wayenburg	5	2

Second round
7	(Kazakhstan) A Shevchenko	6^{8}	5
(China) Y Wu	7^{10}	7
(Spain) M Landaluce	6	6^{5}	6^{5}
4	(United States) E Quinn	1	7^{7}	7^{7}
5	(Peru) I Buse	6	6
Q	(France) T Faurel	4	2
(Spain) R Bautista Agut	6	2	4
2	(Chile) A Tabilo	4	6	6

Quarterfinals
(China) Y Wu	4	7	4
4	(United States) E Quinn	6	5	6
5	(Peru) I Buse	4	0
2	(Chile) A Tabilo	6	6

Semifinals
4	(United States) E Quinn	3	6	6^{2}
2	(Chile) A Tabilo	6	3	7^{7}
