= Indy Challenger =

- 2022 Indy Challenger

ATP Challenger Tour
- Event name: Rajeev Ram Foundation Indy Challenger
- Location: Zionsville, Indiana, United States
- Venue: Pearson Automotive Tennis Club
- Category: ATP Challenger Tour
- Surface: Hard (indoor)
- Website: https://rajeevramfoundation.org

The Indy Challenger, also known as the Rajeev Ram Foundation Indy Challenger, is a professional tennis tournament played on indoor hard courts. Since its founding in 2022 by American professional doubles tennis player Rajeev Ram, it has been organized on the Association of Tennis Professionals (ATP) Challenger Tour and has been held at the Pearson Automotive Tennis Club in Zionsville, Indiana, a suburb north of Indianapolis.

== Past finals ==
=== Singles ===
Year	Champion	Runner-up	Score
2022	(China) Wu Yibing	(United States) Aleksandar Kovacevic	6–7^{(10–12)}, 7–6^{(15–13)}, 6–3

=== Doubles ===
Year	Champions	Runners-up	Score
2022	(Mexico) Hans Hach Verdugo (United States) Hunter Reese	(India) Purav Raja (India) Divij Sharan	7–6^{(7–3)}, 3–6, [10–7]
