= Stefan Dostanic =

American tennis player (born 2001)

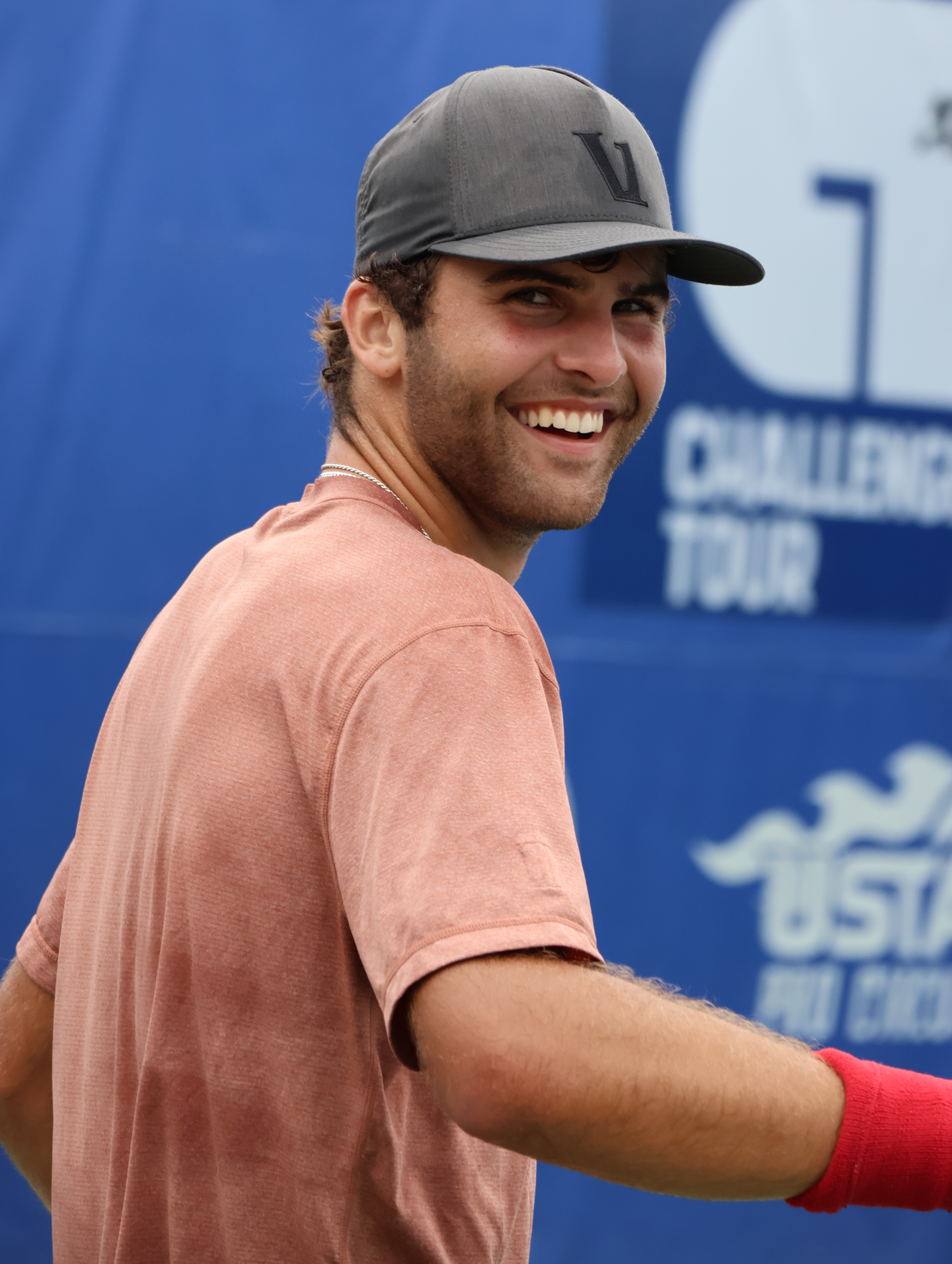
- Dostanic at the 2023 Cary Challenger
- Country (sports): United States
- Born: November 4, 2001 (age 24) Irvine, California, US
- Height: 6 ft 2 in (1.88 m)
- Plays: Right-handed (two-handed backhand)
- College: University of Southern California; Wake Forest University
- Coach: Vahe Assadourian
- Prize money: US $215,401

Singles
- Career record: 1–2
- Career titles: 0
- Highest ranking: No. 261 (May 25, 2026)
- Current ranking: No. 309 (August 31, 2026)

Grand Slam singles results
- US Open: 1R (2025)

Doubles
- Career record: 0–0
- Career titles: 0
- Highest ranking: No. 447 (July 13, 2026)
- Current ranking: No. 523 (August 31, 2026)
- Last updated on: September 1, 2026.

Stefan Dostanic (Serbo-Croatian: Dostanić; born November 4, 2001) is an American tennis player. He has a career-high ATP singles ranking of world No. 261 achieved on May 25, 2026 and a doubles ranking of No. 447 achieved on July 13, 2026.

== Early life ==
He is from Irvine, California. He attended college at University of Southern California before transferring to Wake Forest University. In 2025, he was part of the team to win the 2025 NCAA Team Championship.

== Career ==
Dostanic made his qualifying Masters 1000 debut after he earned a wildcard for the 2024 Indian Wells, having qualified in 2023 through the USTA SoCal Pro Series. He lost to Sumit Nagal in the first round.

Dostanic received a wildcard for the main draw of the 2025 US Open, after winning the American collegiate wildcard tournament over Michael Zheng, for his Grand Slam main draw debut.

He was awarded a wildcard into the main draw of the 2025 Winston-Salem Open and recorded his first ATP win over Aleksandar Vukic.

== ATP Challenger Tour finals ==
=== Singles: 2 (1 title, 1 runner-up) ===
| Legend ATP Challenger Tour (0–1) | Finals by surface Hard (1–0) Clay (0–1) |

| Result | W–L | Date | Tournament | Tier | Surface | Opponent | Score |
|---|---|---|---|---|---|---|---|
| Win | 1–0 | Feb 2026 | Baton Rouge, USA | Challenger | Hard (i) | (Canada) Alexis Galarneau | 6–4, 6–1 |
| Loss | 1–1 | Apr 2026 | Sarasota, USA | Challenger | Clay | (China) Wu Yibing | 1–6, 6–4, 3–6 |

=== Doubles: 1 (title) ===
| Legend ATP Challenger Tour (1–0) | Finals by surface Hard (0–0) Clay (1–0) |

| Result | W–L | Date | Tournament | Tier | Surface | Partner | Opponent | Score |
|---|---|---|---|---|---|---|---|---|
| Win | 1–0 | Apr 2026 | Tallahassee, USA | Challenger | Clay | (United States) Alex Rybakov | (Canada) Cleeve Harper (United Kingdom) David Stevenson | 6–4, 6–2 |
