= Thomas Faurel =

French tennis player (born 2006)

- Country (sports): France
- Born: 21 January 2006 (age 20) New York City, United States
- Height: 1.78 m (5 ft 10 in)
- Plays: Right-handed (two-handed backhand)
- Prize money: US $212,841

Singles
- Career record: 0–1 (at ATP Tour level, Grand Slam level, and in Davis Cup)
- Career titles: 2 ITF
- Highest ranking: No. 293 (9 November 2026
- Current ranking: No. 293 (9 November 2026)

Grand Slam singles results
- French Open: 1R (2026)

Doubles
- Career record: 0–0 (at ATP Tour level, Grand Slam level, and in Davis Cup)
- Career titles: 0
- Highest ranking: No. 901 (9 November 2026)
- Current ranking: No. 901 (9 November 2026)
- Last updated on: 9 November 2026.

Thomas Faurel (born 21 January 2006) is an American-born French tennis player. Faurel has a career high ATP singles ranking of No. 293 and a career high ATP doubles ranking of No. 901, both achieved on 9 November 2026.

== Career ==
=== 2026: Grand Slam debut ===
As a qualifier, Faurel earned his first win over former Top 10 player at 2026 Open Aix Provence, where he defeated David Goffin in straight sets.

In May, Faurel made his Grand Slam debut at the 2026 French Open as a qualifier. Ranked No. 375, he received a wildcard for the qualifying draw. At 20 years and 4 months, Faurel is the second youngest French player to emerge from Roland Garros qualifying this century, after Laurent Lokoli in 2014 (19 years and 7 months).

== Performance timeline ==
Key
W	F	SF	QF	#R	RR	Q#	DNQ	A	NH

(W) winner; (F) finalist; (SF) semifinalist; (QF) quarterfinalist; (#R) rounds 4, 3, 2, 1; (RR) round-robin stage; (Q#) qualification round; (DNQ) did not qualify; (A) absent; (NH) not held; (SR) strike rate (events won / competed); (W–L) win–loss record.

=== Singles ===
Tournament	2024	2025	2026	SR	W–L	Win%
Grand Slam tournaments
Australian Open	A	A	A	0 / 0	0–0	–
French Open	Q1	A	1R	0 / 1	0–1	0%
Wimbledon	A	A		0 / 0	0–0	–
US Open	A	A		0 / 0	0–0	–
Win–loss	0–0	0–0	0–1	0 / 1	0–1	0%
