= Wu Yibing =

Chinese tennis player

Wu Yibing 吴易昺
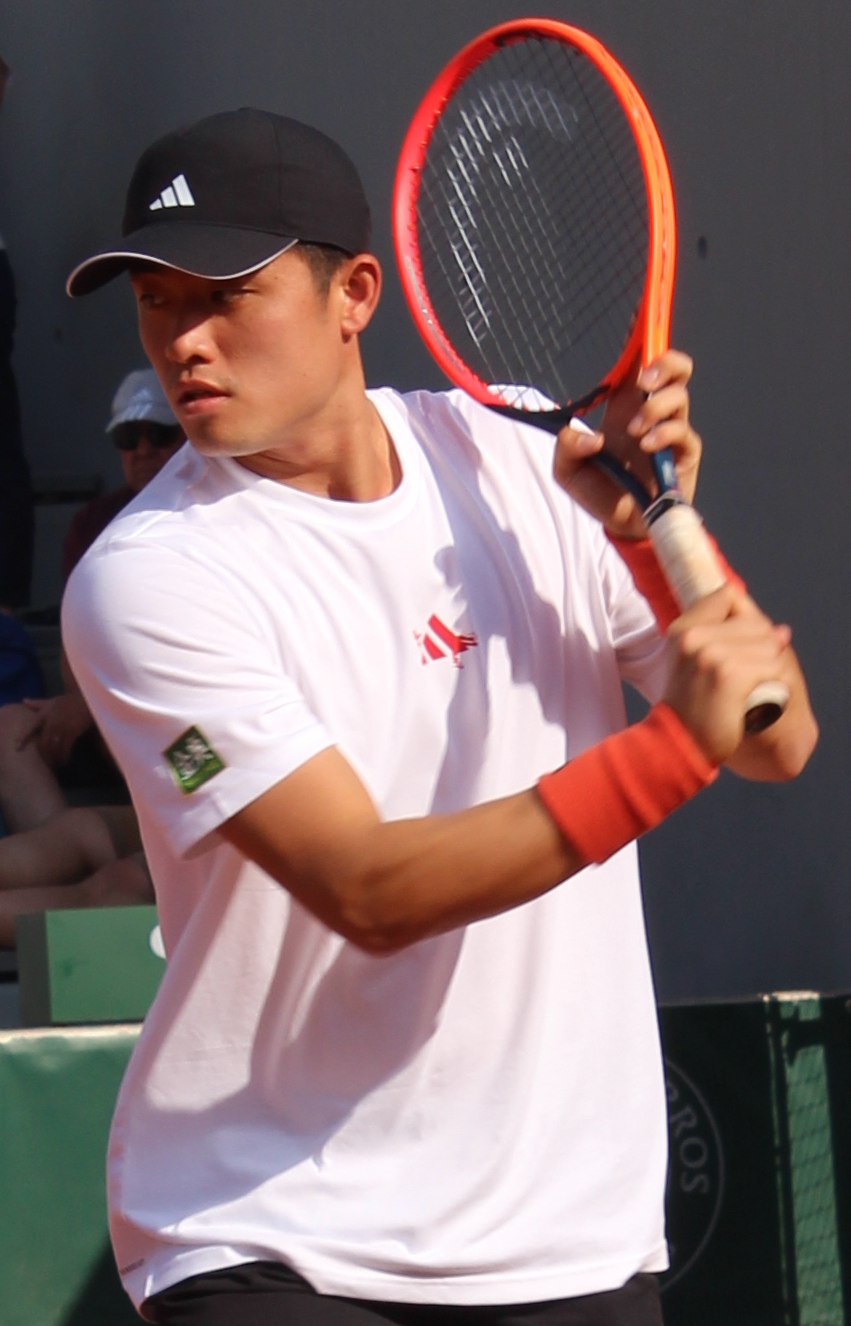
- Wu at the 2023 French Open
- Country (sports): China
- Residence: Bradenton, Florida, US
- Born: 14 October 1999 (age 27) Hangzhou, China
- Height: 1.83 m (6 ft 0 in)
- Turned pro: 2017
- Plays: Right-handed (two-handed backhand)
- Coach: Dante Bottini (2025–present), Marcos Baghdatis (2023–24), Wayne Ferreira (2024), Gerardo Azcurra (2023), Chen Yanbei, Nahum García Sánchez
- Prize money: US $2,074,611

Singles
- Career record: 32–41
- Career titles: 1
- Highest ranking: No. 54 (29 May 2023)
- Current ranking: No. 106 (19 October 2026)

Grand Slam singles results
- Australian Open: 2R (2026)
- French Open: 2R (2026)
- Wimbledon: 1R (2023, 2026)
- US Open: 3R (2022, 2026)

Doubles
- Career record: 2–4
- Career titles: 0
- Highest ranking: No. 295 (23 April 2018)

Grand Slam doubles results
- French Open: 2R (2023)
Medal record
Men's tennis
Representing China
Asian Games
Silver medal – second place	2018 Jakarta-Palembang	Singles
Silver medal – second place	2026 Aichi–Nagoya	Singles
- Last updated on: 3 October 2026.

Wu Yibing (Chinese: 吴易昺; pinyin: Wú Yìbǐng; Mandarin pronunciation: [ǔ î pìŋ]; born 14 October 1999) is a Chinese professional tennis player. Wu is the first Chinese player in the Open Era to reach and to win an ATP Tour-level singles final, doing so at the 2023 Dallas Open. He has been ranked as high as world No. 54 by the ATP, which he first achieved on 29 May 2023, making him the third highest-ranked male Chinese player in history, behind Zhang Zhizhen and Shang Juncheng. He also has a doubles ranking of No. 295, reached on 23 April 2018. He is the current singles No. 2 Chinese player.

Wu represented China at the 2017 Davis Cup, where he has a win/loss record of 1–0. He defeated Jason Jung in his first Davis Cup match.

== Early career ==
Born in Hangzhou, Wu took up tennis at a young age.

== Junior career ==
In 2017, Wu reached the semifinals in both boys' singles and doubles at the Australian Open, and won both the boys' singles and doubles events (with Chinese Taipei player Hsu Yu-hsiou) at the US Open, thus became the first Chinese male to win a Grand Slam Junior title. Following the Junior US Open title, Wu reached an ITF junior combined ranking of world No. 1 on 11 September 2017.

== Professional career ==
=== 2017–18: ATP and Masters 1000 debuts, first ATP Tour win ===
In October 2017, Wu received another wildcard and made his Masters debut at the Shanghai Masters, losing to Gilles Simon in the first round. In 2018, he recorded his first ATP win against compatriot Li Zhe at the Shanghai Masters. In the second round, he lost against eight seed and No. 1 Asian player Kei Nishikori in three sets.

=== 2022: Historic major debut, top 125 ===
In 2022, Wu won three Challenger titles in the United States, including back-to-back trophy runs in July in Rome, Georgia and Indianapolis, Indiana. As a result, on 25 July, he reached the top 200 at a career-high of No. 174. His four career total Challenger titles made him the most decorated Chinese player in the circuit's history.

At the US Open, Wu qualified to make his major debut. He became the first male Chinese in the Open Era to qualify at the US Open, winning his last qualifying match before Zhang Zhizhen also won his last match later in the same day. Wu won his first round match against 31st seed Nikoloz Basilashvili, becoming the first male Chinese player to win a US Open match in the Open era and a Grand Slam match in 63 years since Mei Fu Chi at Wimbledon 1959. He beat fellow qualifier Nuno Borges in five sets in the second round to become the first Chinese male player to reach the third round of any Grand Slam event since Kho Sin-Kie in 1946 Wimbledon. He also became the first Chinese man ever to reach the third round in the tournament history (since 1881).

=== 2023: First Chinese ATP champion in the Open Era, top 55 ===
Wu started his season playing the first Adelaide International, where in qualifying, he defeated Ugo Humbert but lost against Alexei Popyrin. He received a wildcard into the 2023 Australian Open, where he lost against Corentin Moutet in the first round. Following a final showing in the Cleveland Challenger, Wu made his debut in the top 100, at world No. 97 on 6 February 2023, becoming the second Chinese male player to do so after Zhang Zhizhen four months earlier.

In Dallas, Wu defeated Michael Mmoh in the first round, then claimed the biggest win of his career by defeating third seed Denis Shapovalov in the second round to reach his first ATP Tour-level quarterfinal. He beat Adrian Mannarino to become the first Chinese player since Pan Bing in 1995 to reach an ATP Tour-level semifinal as well as the second from China to do so. By defeating top seed and world No. 8 Taylor Fritz in the semifinals, he became the first Chinese male ever to defeat a top 10 ranked player and to make an ATP Tour level final in the Open Era. He went one step further to win the title defeating John Isner, after saving four championship points in the match, and become the first Chinese man in the Open Era to win an ATP Tour title. By doing so, he became the highest-ranked Chinese player in the history of the ATP rankings, and overtook Zhang to become the first Chinese player to enter the top 60 on 13 February 2023. He received a wildcard for the 2023 BNP Paribas Open where he defeated Jaume Munar for his first win at this tournament. At the 2023 Miami Open, he recorded also his first win at this Masters against Kyle Edmund.

=== 2024–25: Historic Masters third round, home semifinal, injury ===
Wu made his return from an injury that halted his 2023 season at the challenger in Jinan, where – despite being inactive for the majority of the season – he won the title, defeating Rio Noguchi in the final. He received a wildcard for 2024 Shanghai Masters, and defeated Sumit Nagal and 25th seed Nicolás Jarry to become the second ever Chinese man to reach the third round of Shanghai (after Zhang Zhizhen), where he lost against Carlos Alcaraz. Wu won his sixth Challenger title at the 2025 Texas Spine and Joint Championships in Tyler.

In August 2025, in Washington, Wu upset Gaël Monfils and Alexei Popyrin to reach the third round as a qualifier, before losing to Daniil Medvedev, putting him back inside the world's top 100. During the Asian swing, he reached his first tour-level semifinal since winning his first tour-level title in Dallas in his home tournament at Hangzhou by beating Adrian Mannarino, Sebastian Korda and Medvedev. He lost to Alexander Bublik in the semifinal. Due to more injuries, he ended his season prematurely, and finished ranked No. 181.

=== 2026: US Open third round, first Australian and French Open wins ===
Wu began his year in Hong Kong after receiving a wildcard and defeated Fábián Marozsán in straight sets, but lost to third seed Andrey Rublev in the second round. Wu then qualified for the Australian Open, allowing him to participate in the main draw of a major for the first time since the 2023 US Open. He won his first match defeating Luca Nardi in four sets, but lost in the second round to Eliot Spizzirri. Despite not qualifying for Delray Beach, Wu was able to continue his good form in Acapulco where, as a qualifier, he reached his first quarterfinal at ATP 500 level after upsetting third seed Casper Ruud and defeating fellow qualifier Sho Shimabukuro Despite losing to eventual champion Flavio Cobolli in straight sets his good results still allowed him to re-enter the world's top 120.

After losing back-to-back matches at Miami and Houston, Wu won his seventh Challenger title and first of the year in Sarasota, allowing him to return to the top 100 for the first time since September 2023. He continued his good form in the lead-up to Roland Garros by reaching the quarterfinals in Aix-en-Provence. At the French Open, Wu defeated Marcos Giron in straight sets to record his first win at the event. At Wimbledon, despite taking a set, Wu lost in the first round to Novak Djokovic.

Wu recorded his first win at tour-level since the French Open at the US Open, defeating Adam Walton in straight sets. He then defeated James Duckworth in the second round to replicate his best ever Grand Slam performance by reaching the third round.

== Performance timelines ==
Key
W	F	SF	QF	#R	RR	Q#	DNQ	A	NH

(W) winner; (F) finalist; (SF) semifinalist; (QF) quarterfinalist; (#R) rounds 4, 3, 2, 1; (RR) round-robin stage; (Q#) qualification round; (DNQ) did not qualify; (A) absent; (NH) not held; (SR) strike rate (events won / competed); (W–L) win–loss record.
To avoid confusion and double counting, these charts are updated at the conclusion of a tournament or when the player's participation has ended.

=== Singles ===
Current through the 2026 French Open.

Tournament	2017	2018	2019	2020	2021	2022	2023	2024	2025	2026	SR	W–L	Win %
Grand Slam tournaments
Australian Open	A	A	A	A	A	A	1R	A	A	2R	0 / 1	1–2	33%
French Open	A	A	A	A	A	A	1R	A	Q1	2R	0 / 2	1–2	33%
Wimbledon	A	A	A	NH	A	A	1R	A	A	1R	0 / 2	0–2	0%
US Open	A	A	A	A	A	3R	2R	A	Q3	3R	0 / 3	5–3	63%
Win–loss	0–0	0–0	0–0	0–0	0–0	2–1	1–4	0–0	0–0	4–4	0 / 9	7–9	42%
ATP Tour Masters 1000
Indian Wells Open	A	A	A	NH	A	A	2R	A	A	A	0 / 1	1–1	50%
Miami Open	Q1	A	A	NH	A	A	2R	A	1R	1R	0 / 3	1–3	25%
Monte-Carlo Masters	A	A	A	NH	A	A	A	A	A	A	0 / 0	0–0	–
Madrid Open	A	A	A	NH	A	A	1R	A	A	Q2	0 / 1	0–1	0%
Italian Open	A	A	A	A	A	A	2R	A	A	A	0 / 1	1–1	50%
Canadian Open	A	A	A	NH	A	A	A	A	A	A	0 / 0	0–0	–
Cincinnati Open	A	A	A	A	A	A	A	A	A	Q2	0 / 0	0–0	–
Shanghai Masters	1R	2R	A	NH			A	3R	1R		0 / 4	3–4	43%
Paris Masters	A	A	A	A	A	A	A	A	A		0 / 0	0–0	–
Win–loss	0–1	1–1	0–0	0–0	0–0	0–0	3–4	2–1	0–2	0–1	0 / 10	6–10	38%
Career statistics
Tournaments	2	4	0	0	0	1	11	3	5	5	Career total: 31		
Titles	0	0	0	0	0	0	1	0	0	0	Career total: 1		
Finals	0	0	0	0	0	0	1	0	0	0	Career total: 1		
Overall win–loss	1–2	3–5	0–1	0–0	0–0	2–1	13–15	2–3	5–5	6–6	32–38		
Win Percentage	33%	38%	0%	–	–	67%	46%	40%	50%	50%	45.71%		
Year-end ranking	313	306	857	890	1119	119	121	408	181		$1,780,102		

=== Doubles ===
Tournament	2017	2018	2019	2020	2021	2022	2023	SR	W–L	Win %
Grand Slam tournaments
Australian Open	A	A	A	A	A	A	A	0 / 0	0–0	–
French Open	A	A	A	A	A	A	2R	0 / 1	1–1	50%
Wimbledon	A	A	A	NH	A	A	A	0 / 0	0–0	–
US Open	A	A	A	A	A	A	A	0 / 0	0–0	–
Win–loss	0–0	0–0	0–0	0–0	0–0	0–0	1–1	0 / 1	1–1	50%
ATP Tour Masters 1000
Indian Wells Masters	A	A	A	NH	A	A	A	0 / 0	0–0	–
Miami Open	A	A	A	NH	A	A	A	0 / 0	0–0	–
Monte-Carlo Masters	A	A	A	NH	A	A	A	0 / 0	0–0	–
Madrid Open	A	A	A	NH	A	A	A	0 / 0	0–0	–
Italian Open	A	A	A	A	A	A	A	0 / 0	0–0	–
Canadian Open	A	A	A	NH	A	A	A	0 / 0	0–0	–
Cincinnati Masters	A	A	A	A	A	A	A	0 / 0	0–0	–
Shanghai Masters	2R	A	A	NH			A	0 / 1	1–1	50%
Paris Masters	A	A	A	A	A	A	A	0 / 0	0–0	–
Win–loss	1–1	0–0	0–0	0–0	0–0	0–0	0–0	0 / 1	1–1	50%
Career statistics
Tournaments	2	0	0	0	0	0	1	Career total: 3		
Titles	0	0	0	0	0	0	0	Career total: 0		
Finals	0	0	0	0	0	0	0	Career total: 0		
Overall win–loss	1–2	0–0	0–0	0–0	0–0	0–0	1–1	2–3		
Win Percentage	33%	–	–	–	–	–	50%	40%		
Year-end ranking	304	624	1178	1250	1542	1149				

== Other significant finals ==
=== Asian Games ===
==== Singles: 2 (2 silver medals) ====
Result	Year	Tournament	Surface	Opponent	Score
Silver	2018	Asian Games	Hard	(Uzbekistan) Denis Istomin	6–2, 2–6, 6–7^{(2–7)}
Silver	2026	Asian Games	Hard	(Hong Kong) Coleman Wong	2–6, 4–6

== ATP Tour finals ==
=== Singles: 1 (title) ===
Legend Grand Slam (–) ATP 1000 (–) ATP 500 (–) ATP 250 (1–0)	Finals by surface Hard (1–0) Clay (–) Grass (–)	Finals by setting Outdoor (–) Indoor (1–0)

Result	W–L	Date	Tournament	Tier	Surface	Opponent	Score
Win	1–0	Feb 2023	Dallas Open, US	ATP 250	Hard (i)	(United States) John Isner	6–7^{(4–7)}, 7–6^{(7–3)}, 7–6^{(14–12)}

== ATP Challenger Tour finals ==
=== Singles: 9 (7 titles, 2 runner-ups) ===
Legend ATP Challenger Tour (7–2)	Finals by surface Hard (6–2) Clay (1–0)

Result	W–L	Date	Tournament	Tier	Surface	Opponent	Score
Win	1–0	Sep 2017	Shanghai Challenger, China	Challenger	Hard	(Chinese Taipei) Lu Yen-hsun	7–6^{(8–6)}, 0–0 ret.
Win	2–0	Jun 2022	Orlando Open, US	Challenger	Hard	(Australia) Jason Kubler	6–7^{(5–7)}, 6–4, 3–1 ret.
Win	3–0	Jul 2022	Georgia's Rome Challenger, US	Challenger	Hard (i)	(United States) Ben Shelton	7–5, 6–3
Win	4–0	Jul 2022	Indy Challenger, US	Challenger	Hard (i)	(United States) Aleksandar Kovacevic	6–7^{(10–12)}, 7–6^{(15–13)}, 6–3
Loss	4–1	Oct 2022	Seoul Open, South Korea	Challenger	Hard	(Australia) Li Tu	6–7^{(5–7)}, 4–6
Loss	4–2	Feb 2023	Cleveland Open, US	Challenger	Hard (i)	(United States) Aleksandar Kovacevic	6–3, 5–7, 6–7^{(2–7)}
Win	5–2	Aug 2024	Jinan Open, China	Challenger	Hard	(Japan) Rio Noguchi	7–5, 6–3
Win	6–2	Jun 2025	Tyler Tennis Championships, US	Challenger	Hard	(China) Zhou Yi	6–4, 3–6, 6–3
Win	7–2	Apr 2026	Sarasota Open, US	Challenger	Clay	(United States) Stefan Dostanic	6–1, 4–6, 6–3

== ITF Futures/World Tennis Tour finals ==
=== Singles: 3 (2 titles, 1 runner-up) ===
Legend ITF Futures/WTT (2–1)

Result	W–L	Date	Tournament	Tier	Surface	Opponent	Score
Win	1–0	Mar 2017	China F3, Anning	Futures	Clay	(Serbia) Danilo Petrović	6–4, 7–6^{(8–6)}
Loss	1–1	Jul 2018	China F10, Shenzhen	Futures	Hard	(China) Te Rigele	6–4, 4–6, 3–6
Win	2–1	Apr 2022	M15 Orange Park, US	WTT	Clay	(United States) Michael Zheng	7–6^{(7–4)}, 7–5

=== Doubles: 1 (runner-up) ===
Legend ITF Futures (0–1)

Result	W–L	Date	Tournament	Tier	Surface	Partner	Opponents	Score
Loss	0–1	May 2017	Spain F12, Lleida	Futures	Clay	(Bolivia) Boris Arias	(Italy) Erik Crepaldi (Germany) Pascal Meis	6–7^{(3–7)}, 4–6

== Junior Grand Slam finals ==
=== Singles: 1 (title) ===
Result	Year	Tournament	Surface	Opponent	Score
Win	2017	US Open	Hard	(Argentina) Axel Geller	6–4, 6–4

=== Doubles: 1 (title) ===
Result	Year	Tournament	Surface	Partner	Opponents	Score
Win	2017	US Open	Hard	(Chinese Taipei) Hsu Yu-hsiou	(Japan) Toru Horie (Japan) Yuta Shimizu	6–4, 5–7, [11–9]

== Exhibition finals ==
Result	Date	Tournament	Surface	Opponent	Score
Win	Jul 2023	Ultimate Tennis Showdown, Los Angeles, US	Hard	(United States) Taylor Fritz	11–16, 7–20, 12–11, 16–9, 2–0

== Wins over top 10 players ==
- Wu has a 1–4 record against players who were, at the time the match was played, ranked in the top 10.

Season	2023	2024	Total
Wins	1	0	1

#	Player	Rank	Event	Surface	Rd	Score	Rk
2023
1.	(United States) Taylor Fritz	8	Dallas Open, US	Hard (i)	SF	6–7^{(3–7)}, 7–5, 6–4	97
