= Clément Tabur =

French tennis player (born 2000)

- Tabur at the 2026 Wimbledon Championships
- Country (sports): France
- Residence: Saint Lambert la Potherie, France
- Born: 24 January 2000 (age 26) Reims, France
- Height: 1.73 m (5 ft 8 in)
- Plays: Right-handed (two-handed backhand)
- Coach: Evan Furness, Arthur Dreillard
- Prize money: US $763,236

Singles
- Career record: 3–5 (in ATP Tour and Grand Slam main draw matches, and in Davis Cup)
- Career titles: 1 Challenger, 11 ITF
- Highest ranking: No. 158 (19 October 2026)
- Current ranking: No. 158 (19 October 2026)

Grand Slam singles results
- Australian Open: Q1 (2024, 2026)
- French Open: 1R (2025, 2026)
- Wimbledon: Q3 (2026)
- US Open: Q1 (2025, 2026)

Doubles
- Career record: 0–2
- Career titles: 1 Challenger, 9 ITF
- Highest ranking: No. 385 (2 March 2020)

Grand Slam doubles results
- French Open: 1R (2018, 2019)
- Last updated on: 19 October 2026.

Clément Tabur (born 24 January 2000) is a French tennis player who competes on the ATP Challenger Tour. He has a career-high ATP singles ranking of No. 158 achieved on 19 October 2026 and a career-high ATP doubles ranking of No. 385 achieved on 2 March 2020.

Tabur has reached 18 singles finals on the ITF Futures Tour with a record of 11–7, as well as reaching 19 doubles finals also on the ITF Futures Tour with a record of 10–9.

== Junior career ==
As a junior, Tabur reached a career high ITF junior combined ranking of world No. 28, achieved on 22 January 2018.

In January 2018, Tabur alongside Hugo Gaston won the 2018 Australian Open boys' doubles, defeating Rudolf Molleker and Henri Squire in the final.

== Professional career ==
=== 2018-2019: Grand Slam doubles debut ===
Tabur made his debut appearance on the ATP Tour at the 2018 French Open where he was granted a wild card entry into the main doubles draw alongside juniors partner and compatriot Hugo Gaston. They were defeated in the first round by Julio Peralta and Horacio Zeballos.

Tabur and Hugo Gaston were once again given a wildcard at the 2019 French Open losing in the first round to Guido Pella and Diego Schwartzman.

=== 2021-2022: First ITF title ===
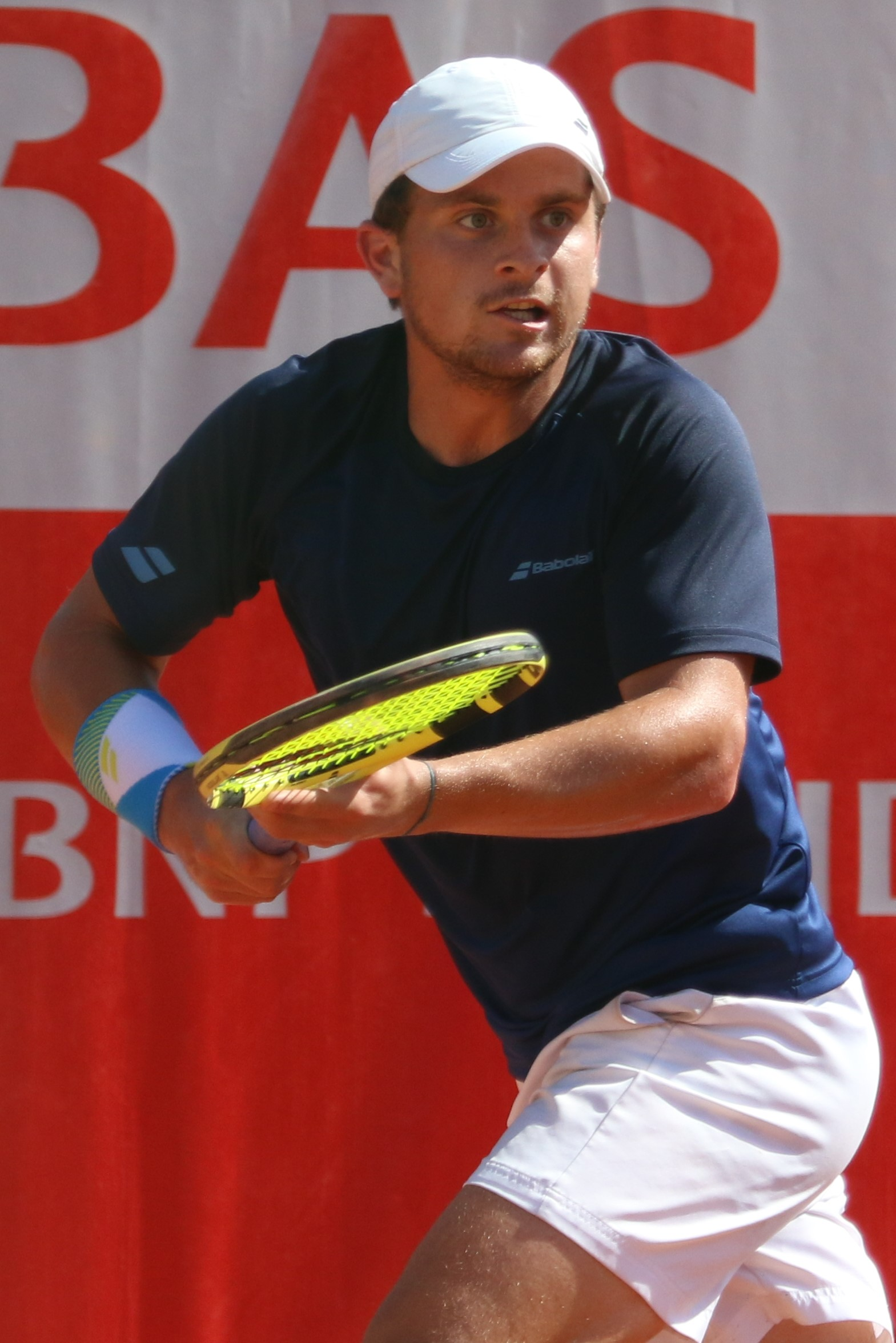
Tabur at the 2022 BNP Paribas Primrose Bordeaux

In February, Tabur won his first ITF title in Naples, Florida, defeating Christian Harrison in the final.

=== 2023: First Challenger final, top 250 ===
In July, Tabur entered the top 300 in the ATP rankings, following three ITF titles. In August 2023, Tabur reached his first final on the ATP Challenger Tour at the 2023 Internazionali di Tennis Città di Todi, losing to Luciano Darderi in a 3 setter, 6-4 6-7 6-1.

Over the course of the year, Tabur won six ITF titles, making him the third player with the most ITF titles for 2023.

=== 2024: Second Challenger final ===
In March, Tabur reached his second final on the ATP Challenger Tour in Kigali, Rwanda, losing to Marco Trungelliti in the final. As a result, he reached a new career high ranking of No. 202 on 18 March 2024.

=== 2025: Major debut, first ATP wins and quarterfinal, top 200 ===
In May, Tabur made his Grand Slam main draw debut at the French Open as a qualifier, having received a wildcard for the qualifying rounds. He was defeated by Corentin Moutet in the first round.

In November, Tabur recorded his first ATP Tour win at the Moselle Open in Metz, France. He reached the main draw as a qualifier, having received a wildcard for the qualifying rounds. In the first round, he defeated Aleksandar Kovacevic, his first top 100 win. In the second round, he defeated Alexander Blockx to reach his first ATP Tour quarterfinal. He lost to lucky loser Vitaliy Sachko having defeated him in qualifying.

=== 2026: Maiden Challenger title, top 175 ===
In April, Tabur won his maiden Challenger title in Tallahassee, defeating João Lucas Reis da Silva in the final. In May he received the last main draw wildcard for the 2026 French Open following the direct acceptance into the main draw of Stan Wawrinka.

== Performance timeline ==
Key
W	F	SF	QF	#R	RR	Q#	DNQ	A	NH

(W) winner; (F) finalist; (SF) semifinalist; (QF) quarterfinalist; (#R) rounds 4, 3, 2, 1; (RR) round-robin stage; (Q#) qualification round; (DNQ) did not qualify; (A) absent; (NH) not held; (SR) strike rate (events won / competed); (W–L) win–loss record.

=== Singles ===
Tournament	2022	2023	2024	2025	2026	SR	W–L	Win%
Grand Slam tournaments
Australian Open	A	A	Q1	A	Q1	0 / 0	0–0	–
French Open	Q1	A	Q1	1R	1R	0 / 2	0–2	0%
Wimbledon	A	A	Q1	A	Q3	0 / 0	0–0	–
US Open	A	A	A	Q1	Q1	0 / 0	0–0	–
Win–loss	0–0	0–0	0–0	0–1	0–0	0 / 1	0–1	0%

== Junior Grand Slam finals ==
=== Doubles: 1 (1 title) ===
Result	Year	Tournament	Surface	Partner	Opponent	Score
Winners	2018	Australian Open	Hard	(France) Hugo Gaston	(Germany) Rudolf Molleker (Germany) Henri Squire	6–2, 6–2

== ATP Challenger and ITF Tour finals ==
=== Singles: 19 (12-7) ===
Legend ATP Challenger (1–2) ITF Futures/World Tennis Tour (11–5)	Finals by surface Hard (3–3) Clay (9–4)

Result	W–L	Date	Tournament	Tier	Surface	Opponent	Score
Loss	0–1	Dec 2018	Tunisia F45, Monastir	Futures	Hard	(Canada) Steven Diez	3–6, 6–7^{(3–7)}
Win	1–1	Feb 2021	M25 Naples, United States	World Tennis Tour	Clay	(United States) Christian Harrison	6–1, 1–6, 6–3
Loss	1–2	Nov 2021	M15, Monastir, Tunisia	World Tennis Tour	Hard	(Tunisia) Moez Echargui	1–6, 2–6
Loss	1–3	Jan 2022	M25, Monastir, Tunisia	World Tennis Tour	Hard	(Japan) Sho Shimabukuro	1–6, 6–4, 1–6
Win	2–3	Mar 2022	M25, Faro, Portugal	World Tennis Tour	Hard	(Czech Republic) Dalibor Svrčina	6–4, 6–2
Win	3–3	Mar 2022	M15, Creteil, France	World Tennis Tour	Hard	(France) Axel Garcian	7–5, 6–1
Win	4–3	Apr 2023	M25, Angers, France	World Tennis Tour	Clay (i)	(France) Maxime Chazal	6–4, 6–3
Win	5–3	May 2023	M25, Kuršumlijska Banja, Serbia	World Tennis Tour	Clay	(North Macedonia) Kalin Ivanovski	6–4, 3–6, 6–2
Win	6–3	Jul 2023	M25 Padova, Italy	World Tennis Tour	Clay	(Italy) Samuel Vincent Ruggeri	1–6, 7–6^{(7–5)}, 6–3
Loss	6–4	Aug 2023	Todi, Italy	Challenger	Clay	(Italy) Luciano Darderi	4–6, 7–6^{(7–5)}, 1–6
Win	7–4	Aug 2023	M25 Lesa, Italy	World Tennis Tour	Clay	(Germany) Tim Handel	3–6, 6–4, 6–1
Win	8–4	Sep 2023	M25 Pazardzhik, Bulgaria	World Tennis Tour	Clay	(Bulgaria) Yanaki Milev	6–2, 3–6, 6–2
Win	9–4	Nov 2023	M25, Monastir, Tunisia	World Tennis Tour	Hard	(Lebanon) Hady Habib	3–6, 6–3, 6–4
Loss	9–5	Feb 2024	M25, Antalya, Turkey	World Tennis Tour	Clay	(Dominican Republic) Nick Hardt	1–6, 4–6
Loss	9–6	Mar 2024	Kigali, Rwanda	Challenger	Clay	(Argentina) Marco Trungelliti	4–6, 2–6
Win	10–6	Mar 2025	M25, Reus, Spain	World Tennis Tour	Clay	(Spain) Nikolás Sánchez Izquierdo	6–4, 6–4
Loss	10–7	Apr 2025	M25, Angers, France	World Tennis Tour	Clay	(France) Arthur Reymond	2-6, 6-2, 7-6
Win	11–7	May 2025	M25, Vic, Spain	World Tennis Tour	Clay	(Italy) Lorenzo Giustino	6-4, 7-6
Win	12–7	Apr 2026	Tallahassee, United States	Challenger	Clay	(Brazil) João Lucas Reis da Silva	6–4, 1–0 ret.

=== Doubles: 19 (10–9) ===
Legend ATP Challenger (1–0) ITF Futures (9–9)	Finals by surface Hard (3–2) Clay (7–7) Grass (0–0) Carpet (0–0)

Result	W–L	Date	Tournament	Tier	Surface	Partner	Opponents	Score
Loss	0–1	Jul 2017	Belgium F4, Lasne	Futures	Clay	(France) Maxence Broville	(France) Corentin Denolly (France) Alexandre Muller	1–6, 3–6
Win	1–1	Dec 2017	Tunisia F40, Hammamet	Futures	Clay	(France) Manuel Guinard	(France) Samuel Bensoussan (France) Francois-Arthur Vibert	6–7^{(6–9)}, 6–2, [13–11]
Win	2–1	May 2018	France F9, Grasse	Futures	Clay	(France) Hugo Gaston	(France) Corentin Denolly (France) Alexandre Muller	6–2, 6–4
Loss	2–2	July 2018	France F14, Uriage	Futures	Clay	(France) Titouan Droguet	(France) Hugo Voljacques (France) Maxime Tchoutakian	6–7^{(3-7)}, 6–2, [4–10]
Win	3–2	Mar 2019	M15 Poitiers, France	World Tennis Tour	Hard	(France) Matteo Martineau	(France) Tony Bourcet (France) Antoine Escoffier	6–3, 6–4
Loss	3–3	Mar 2019	M15 Tabarka, Tunisia	World Tennis Tour	Clay	(France) Geoffrey Blancaneaux	(Germany) Christoph Negritu (Peru) Alexander Merino	2–6, 2–6
Win	4–3	May 2019	M15 Tabarka, Tunisia	World Tennis Tour	Clay	(France) Lilian Marmousez	(Bosnia and Herzegovina) Darko Bojanovic (Netherlands) Glenn Smits	3–6, 6–3, [10–8]
Win	5–3	Aug 2019	M15 Tabarka, Tunisia	World Tennis Tour	Clay	(France) Corentin Denolly	(Argentina) Ignacio Carou (Argentina) Franco Feitt	6–0, 6–1
Loss	5–4	Sep 2019	M15 Tabarka, Tunisia	World Tennis Tour	Clay	(Russia) Andrey Chepelev	(Slovenia) Tomas Lipovsek Puches (Argentina) Matias Zukas	6–7^{(2-7)}, 4–6
Win	6–4	Sep 2019	M25 Santa Margherita, Italy	World Tennis Tour	Clay	(Netherlands) Thiemo de Bakker	(Italy) Jacopo Berrettini (Italy) Alessandro Petrone	2–6, 6–1, [10–7]
Win	7–4	Jan 2020	M15+H Bressuire, France	World Tennis Tour	Hard	(France) Lucas Poullain	(Poland) Wojciech Marek (Sweden) Christian Samuelsson	7–5, 4–6, [10–6]
Win	8–4	Nov 2020	M15 Heraklion, Greece	World Tennis Tour	Hard	(France) Evan Furness	(Germany) Lucas Gerch (Mexico) Gerardo Lopez Villasenor	7–6^{(7-4)}, 7–6^{(7-4)}
Loss	8–5	Aug 2021	M25 Pitesti, Romania	World Tennis Tour	Clay	(France) Corentin Denolly	(France) Valentin Royer (Chinese Taipei) Chun Hsin Tseng	6–4, 2–6, [10–8]
Win	9–5	Oct 2021	M25 Skopje, North Macedonia	World Tennis Tour	Clay	(Croatia) Domagoj Biljesko	(Italy) Stefano Battaglino (Ukraine) Eric Vanshelboim	6–1,6-3
Loss	9–6	Nov 2021	M15 Platja d'Aro, Spain	World Tennis Tour	Clay	(France) Valentin Lapalu	(France) Maxime Chazal (Belgium) Julien Cagnina	5-7, 4–6
Loss	9–7	Jan 2022	M25 Monastir, Tunisia	World Tennis Tour	Hard	(France) Dan Added	(France) Theo Arribage (Bulgaria) Alexander Donski	6-2, 5–7, [10-7]
Loss	9–8	Feb 2023	M25 Faro, Portugal	World Tennis Tour	Hard	(France) Lucas Poullain	(France) Antoine Hoang (France) Gregoire Jacq	0-6, 1-6
Loss	9–9	May 2023	M25 Carnac, France	World Tennis Tour	Clay	(France) Matteo Martineau	(France) Maxence Broville (Argentina) Federico Agustin Gomez	6-7^{(5–7)}, 2-6
Win	10–9	Mar 2024	Kigali, Rwanda	Challenger	Clay	(Netherlands) Max Houkes	(Thailand) Pruchya Isaro (Indonesia) Christopher Rungkat	6–3, 7–6 ^{(7–4)}
