= Tyler Tennis Championships =

Tyler Championships
- 2026 Tyler Tennis Championships

ATP Challenger Tour
- Event name: Texas Spine and Joint Men's Championships (2025-), Tyler Tennis Championships (2023-24)
- Location: Tyler, Texas, United States
- Venue: Tyler Racquet Club
- Category: ATP Challenger Tour
- Surface: Hard
- Prize money: $100,000 (2025)
- Website: website

The Texas Spine and Joint Men's Championships is a professional tennis tournament played on hardcourts. It is currently part of the ATP Challenger Tour. It was first held in Tyler, Texas, United States in 2001-2002 as the Tyler Challenger.

== Past finals ==
=== Singles ===
Year	Champion	Runner-up	Score
2026	(Australia) Adam Walton	(United States) Andre Ilagan	7–5, 6–1
2025	(China) Wu Yibing	(China) Zhou Yi	6–4, 3–6, 6–3
2024	(Japan) James Trotter	(United States) Brandon Holt	6–2, 7–6^{(7–3)}
2023	(United States) Nicolas Moreno de Alboran	(Kazakhstan) Mikhail Kukushkin	6–7^{(8–10)}, 7–6^{(7–0)}, 6–4

=== Doubles ===
Year	Champions	Runners-up	Score
2026	(India) Rithvik Choudary Bollipalli (India) Ramkumar Ramanathan	(United States) Zachary Fuchs (United States) Wally Thayne	7–6^{(7–2)}, 7–6^{(7–4)}
2025	(New Zealand) Finn Reynolds (New Zealand) James Watt	(Spain) Àlex Martínez (Colombia) Adrià Soriano Barrera	6–3, 6–1
2024	(Mexico) Hans Hach Verdugo (Japan) James Trotter	(Ecuador) Andrés Andrade (Jordan) Abdullah Shelbayh	7–6^{(7–3)}, 6–4
2023	(Australia) Alex Bolt (Australia) Andrew Harris	(United States) Evan King (United States) Reese Stalder	6–1, 6–4
