= Andy Andrade =

Ecuadorian tennis player

- Andrade at the 2026 Wimbledon Championships
- Full name: Andrés Andrade
- Country (sports): Ecuador (2021–present); United States (2014–2019)
- Born: December 14, 1998 (age 27) Guayaquil, Ecuador
- Height: 1.80 m (5 ft 11 in)
- Plays: Right-handed (two-handed backhand)
- College: Florida
- Prize money: US $348,888

Singles
- Career record: 6–5
- Career titles: 0
- Highest ranking: No. 203 (14 September 2026)
- Current ranking: No. 211 (16 November 2026)

Grand Slam singles results
- French Open: Q1 (2026)
- Wimbledon: Q1 (2026)

Doubles
- Career record: 6–2
- Career titles: 1
- Highest ranking: No. 156 (20 April 2026)
- Current ranking: No. 167 (16 November 2026)
- Last updated on: 16 November 2026.

Andrés Andrade (born December 14, 1998), also known as Andy Andrade, is an Ecuadorian tennis player. He has a career high ATP singles ranking of world No. 203 achieved on 14 September 2026 and a doubles ranking of No. 156 achieved on 20 April 2026. He is currently the No. 1 Ecuadorian tennis player.

Andrade played college tennis at the University of Florida.

Andrade represents Ecuador at the Davis Cup, where he has a W/L record of 0–1.

== Career ==
=== 2024: Two Challenger finals, Top 250 ===
In April 2024, he reached his first final at the 2024 Savannah Challenger, losing to Alexander Ritschard.

Following a second Challenger final at the 2024 RD Open in Santo Domingo, Dominican Republic, where he entered the main draw as lucky loser, he reached the top 250 in the rankings on 19 August 2024.

=== 2026: Maiden ATP title in doubles ===
At the Fayez Sarofim & Co. US Men's Clay Court Championship Andrade lifted his maiden ATP title with Ben Shelton.

== ATP Tour finals ==
=== Doubles: 1 (1 title) ===
Legend Grand Slam (0–0) ATP 1000 (0–0) ATP 500 (0–0) ATP 250 (1–0)	Finals by surface Hard (0–0) Clay (1–0) Grass (0–0)	Finals by setting Outdoor (1–0) Indoor (0–0)

Result	W–L	Date	Tournament	Tier	Surface	Partner	Opponents	Score
Win	1–0	Apr 2026	U.S. Men's Clay Court Championships, US	ATP 250	Clay	(United States) Ben Shelton	(Brazil) Orlando Luz (Brazil) Rafael Matos	4–6, 6–3, [10–6]

== ATP Challenger Tour finals ==
=== Singles: 3 (3 runner-ups) ===
Legend ATP Challenger Tour (0–3)

Result	W–L	Date	Tournament	Tier	Surface	Opponent	Score
Loss	0–1	Apr 2024	Savannah Challenger, US	Challenger	Clay	(Switzerland) Alexander Ritschard	2–6, 4–6
Loss	0–2	Aug 2024	Santo Domingo Open, Dominican Republic	Challenger	Clay	(Bosnia and Herzegovina) Damir Džumhur	4–6, 4–6
Loss	0–3	Aug 2026	Kingston Open, Jamaica	Challenger	Hard	(United States) Aidan Mayo	3–6, 6–7^{(7–9)}

=== Doubles: 5 (2 titles, 3 runner-ups) ===
Legend ATP Challenger Tour (2–3)	Finals by surface Hard (2–3) Clay (–)

Result	W–L	Date	Tournament	Tier	Surface	Partner	Opponents	Score
Loss	0–1	Jun 2024	Tyler Championships, US	Challenger	Hard	(Jordan) Abdullah Shelbayh	(Mexico) Hans Hach Verdugo (Japan) James Trotter	6–7^{(3–7)}, 4–6
Win	1–1	Jul 2024	Championnats de Granby, Canada	Challenger	Hard	(United States) Mac Kiger	(Canada) Justin Boulais (Canada) Joshua Lapadat	3–6, 6–3, [10–2]
Loss	1–2	May 2025	Little Rock Challenger, US	Challenger	Hard	(Colombia) Nicolás Mejía	(Tunisia) Aziz Dougaz (France) Antoine Escoffier	2–6, 3–6
Win	2–2	Mar 2026	Morelos Open, Mexico	Challenger	Hard	(Argentina) Federico Agustín Gómez	(India) Rithvik Choudary Bollipalli (India) Arjun Kadhe	6–3, 7–6^{(7–4)}
Loss	2–3	Nov 2026	Knoxville Challenger, US	Challenger	Hard (i)	(Denmark) Johannes Ingildsen	(Netherlands) Jarno Jans (Belgium) Joran Vliegen	5–7, 3–6

== ITF Tour finals ==
=== Singles: 12 (5 titles, 7 runner-ups) ===
Legend ITF WTT (5–7)	Finals by surface Hard (2–4) Clay (3–3)

Result	W–L	Date	Tournament	Tier	Surface	Opponent	Score
Win	1–0	Jun 2022	M15 Quito, Ecuador	WTT	Clay	(Colombia) Nicolás Buitrago	6–3, 7–6^{(7–4)}
Loss	1–1	Aug 2022	M15 Cancún, Mexico	WTT	Hard	(Australia) Adam Walton	6–7^{(3–7)}, 6–2, 3–6
Loss	1–2	Nov 2022	M25 Austin, US	WTT	Hard	(United States) Micah Braswell	2–6, 2–6
Loss	1–3	Apr 2023	M15 Santo Domingo de los Tsáchilas, Ecuador	WTT	Clay	(Peru) Gonzalo Bueno	2–6, 1–6
Loss	1–4	Feb 2024	M15 Palm Coast, US	WTT	Clay	(Kazakhstan) Dmitry Popko	5–7, 6–1, 5–7
Loss	1–5	Feb 2024	M25 Naples, US	WTT	Clay	(Kazakhstan) Dmitry Popko	6–3, 6–7^{(4–7)}, 4–6
Loss	1–6	Mar 2024	M25 Santo Domingo, Dominican Republic	WTT	Hard	(United States) Thai-Son Kwiatkowski	4–6, 6–7^{(3–7)}
Win	2–6	May 2024	M25 Pensacola, US	WTT	Clay	(Lebanon) Hady Habib	7–6^{(7–5)}, 7–5
Win	3–6	May 2025	M25 Pensacola, US	WTT	Clay	(United States) Alex Rybakov	6–4, 6–4
Loss	3–7	Jun 2025	M25 Wichita, US	WTT	Hard	(Japan) Hiroki Moriya	6–7^{(6–8)}, 3–6
Win	4–7	Sep 2025	M25 Barueri, Brazil	WTT	Hard	(Brazil) Gustavo Heide	6–4, 6–3
Win	5–7	Sep 2025	M25 Salvador, Brazil	WTT	Hard	(Morocco) Taha Baadi	6–1, 6–1

=== Doubles: 8 (7 titles, 1 runner-up) ===
Legend ITF WTT (7–1)	Finals by surface Hard (3–1) Clay (4–0)

Result	W–L	Date	Tournament	Tier	Surface	Partner	Opponents	Score
Win	1–0	Aug 2022	M25 Portoviejo, Ecuador	WTT	Clay	(United States) Tristan McCormick	(Chile) Miguel Fernando Pereira (Chile) Matías Soto	7–6^{(7–5)}, 6–3
Win	2–0	Aug 2022	M25 Guayaquil, Ecuador	WTT	Clay	(United States) Tristan McCormick	(Argentina) Leonardo Aboian (Argentina) Matías Franco Descotte	7–6^{(11–9)}, 7–6^{(7–2)}
Win	3–0	Oct 2022	M15 Cancún, Mexico	WTT	Hard	(India) Siddhant Banthia	(United States) Jake Bhangdia (United Kingdom) Hamish Stewart	6–7^{(3–7)}, 6–3, [10–8]
Win	4–0	Mar 2023	M15 Heraklion, Greece	WTT	Hard	(Italy) Andrea Picchione	(Czech Republic) Matthew William Donald (Denmark) Elmer Møller	6–3, 6–3
Win	5–0	May 2023	M25 Xalapa, Mexico	WTT	Hard	(Argentina) Facundo Mena	(Canada) Juan Carlos Aguilar (Peru) Jorge Panta	7–6^{(7–3)}, 6–3
Loss	5–1	Oct 2023	M15 Las Vegas, US	WTT	Hard	(United States) William Grant	(Ecuador) Angel Diaz Jalil (United Kingdom) Johannus Monday	4–6, 4–6
Win	6–1	Feb 2024	M15 Sunrise, US	WTT	Clay	(United States) Alex Rybakov	(United States) Harrison Adams (Peru) Alexander Merino	6–3, 6–3
Win	7–1	Feb 2024	M15 Palm Coast, US	WTT	Clay	(United States) Alex Rybakov	(Colombia) Juan Sebastián Gómez (New Zealand) Finn Reynolds	6–1, 6–3
