= 2024 Cranbrook Tennis Classic =

- Date: 1 – 7 July
- Edition: 2nd
- Surface: Hard
- Location: Bloomfield Hills, Michigan, United States

Champions

Singles
- (United States) Learner Tien

Doubles
- (United States) Ryan Seggerman / (United States) Patrik Trhac
← 2023 ·	Cranbrook Tennis Classic	· 2025 →

The 2024 Cranbrook Tennis Classic was a professional tennis tournament played on hardcourts. It was the second edition of the tournament which was part of the 2024 ATP Challenger Tour. It took place in Bloomfield Hills, Michigan, United States between July 1 and July 7, 2024.

== Singles main-draw entrants ==
=== Seeds ===
Country	Player	Rank^{1}	Seed
USA	J. J. Wolf	108	1
USA	Emilio Nava	136	2
AUS	Tristan Schoolkate	179	3
NED	Gijs Brouwer	190	4
USA	Mitchell Krueger	194	5
CHN	Bu Yunchaokete	197	6
USA	Tristan Boyer	210	7
AUS	Marc Polmans	211	8

- ^{1} Rankings are as of 24 June 2024.

=== Other entrants ===
The following players received wildcards into the singles main draw:

- (United States) Andres Martin
- (United States) Learner Tien
- (United States) Michael Zheng

The following players received entry into the singles main draw as alternates:

- (United States) Nishesh Basavareddy
- (Switzerland) Antoine Bellier

The following players received entry from the qualifying draw:

- (Mexico) Ernesto Escobedo
- (United States) Stefan Kozlov
- (United States) Christian Langmo
- (United States) Ryan Seggerman
- (Japan) Kaichi Uchida
- (United States) Quinn Vandecasteele

== Champions ==
=== Singles ===
- (United States) Learner Tien def. (United States) Nishesh Basavareddy 4–6, 6–3, 6–4.

=== Doubles ===
- (United States) Ryan Seggerman / (United States) Patrik Trhac def. (United States) Ozan Baris / (United States) Nishesh Basavareddy 4–6, 6–3, [10–6].
