= 2025 Cranbrook Tennis Classic – Doubles =

Doubles
- 2025 Cranbrook Tennis Classic

Final
- Champions: (Chinese Taipei) Hsu Yu-hsiou (Chinese Taipei) Huang Tsung-hao
- Runners-up: (United States) Theodore Winegar (United States) Michael Zheng
- Score: 4–6, 6–3, [11–9]

Events
Singles	Doubles
← 2024 ·	Cranbrook Tennis Classic	· 2026 →

Ryan Seggerman and Patrik Trhac were the defending champions but chose not to defend their title.

Hsu Yu-hsiou and Huang Tsung-hao won the title after defeating Theodore Winegar and Michael Zheng 4–6, 6–3, [11–9] in the final.

== Seeds ==
1. (Australia) Blake Bayldon / (United States) Trey Hilderbrand (quarterfinals)
2. (India) Anirudh Chandrasekar / (India) Ramkumar Ramanathan (quarterfinals)
3. (India) Niki Kaliyanda Poonacha / (India) Jeevan Nedunchezhiyan (quarterfinals)
4. (Australia) Patrick Harper / (United States) Joshua Sheehy (quarterfinals)

== Draw ==
Key

- Q = Qualifier
- WC = Wild card
- LL = Lucky loser
- Alt = Alternate
- ITF = ITF entry
- PR = Protected ranking
- SR = Special ranking
- SE = Special exempt
- JE = Junior exempt
- JR = Junior Accelerator Programme entrant
- CO = College Accelerator Programme entrant
- NG = Next Gen Accelerator Program entrant
- w/o = Walkover
- r = Retired
- d = Defaulted

=== Draw ===
First round
1	(Australia) B Bayldon (United States) T Hilderbrand	6	4	[10]
(Japan) M Imamura (Japan) Y Shimizu	4	6	[8]
(South Africa) Kris van Wyk (Chinese Taipei) T-l Wu	0^{r}
(Chinese Taipei) Y-h Hsu (Chinese Taipei) T-h Huang	3
3	(India) N Kaliyanda Poonacha (India) J Nedunchezhiyan	6^{4}	6	[10]
(Antigua and Barbuda) J Maginley (United States) E Spizzirri	7^{7}	4	[8]
PR	(Chinese Taipei) J Jung (United States) R Stalder	6	7
(Japan) Ryuki Matsuda (Canada) K Stevenson	3	5
WC	(United States) T Winegar (United States) M Zheng	7^{7}	6
(United States) M Kiger (United States) Patrick Maloney	6^{4}	1
(Australia) K Pearson (Australia) L Tu	6	4	[8]
4	(Australia) P Harper (United States) J Sheehy	2	6	[10]
WC	(United States) S Dostanic (United States) B Kittay	2	6	[10]
(Colombia) N Mejía (Colombia) C Rodríguez	6	3	[5]

Quarterfinals
1	(Australia) B Bayldon (United States) T Hilderbrand	6	4	[3]
(Chinese Taipei) Y-h Hsu (Chinese Taipei) T-h Huang	0	6	[10]
3	(India) N Kaliyanda Poonacha (India) J Nedunchezhiyan	1	2
PR	(Chinese Taipei) J Jung (United States) R Stalder	6	6
WC	(United States) T Winegar (United States) M Zheng	6	4	[10]
4	(Australia) P Harper (United States) J Sheehy	3	6	[7]
WC	(United States) S Dostanic (United States) B Kittay	4	6	[10]
2	(India) A Chandrasekar (India) R Ramanathan	6	4	[7]

Semifinals
(Chinese Taipei) Y-h Hsu (Chinese Taipei) T-h Huang	3	6	[10]
PR	(Chinese Taipei) J Jung (United States) R Stalder	6	3	[8]
WC	(United States) T Winegar (United States) M Zheng	w/o
WC	(United States) S Dostanic (United States) B Kittay

Final
(Chinese Taipei) Y-h Hsu (Chinese Taipei) T-h Huang	4	6	[11]
WC	(United States) T Winegar (United States) M Zheng	6	3	[9]
