= 2025 Cranbrook Tennis Classic – Singles =

Singles
- 2025 Cranbrook Tennis Classic

Final
- Champion: (Estonia) Mark Lajal
- Runner-up: (United States) Andres Martin
- Score: 6–7^{(7–9)}, 7–5, 7–6^{(11–9)}

Events
| Singles | Doubles |
- Cranbrook Tennis Classic

Learner Tien was the defending champion but chose not to defend his title.

Mark Lajal won the title after defeating Andres Martin 6–7^{(7–9)}, 7–5, 7–6^{(11–9)} in the final.

== Seeds ==
1. (United States) Nishesh Basavareddy (first round)
2. (Japan) Shintaro Mochizuki (first round, retired)
3. (Belgium) Alexander Blockx (second round)
4. (United States) Christopher Eubanks (second round)
5. (United States) Eliot Spizzirri (semifinals)
6. (Denmark) August Holmgren (second round)
7. (Australia) Li Tu (second round)
8. (Lebanon) Hady Habib (first round)

== Draw ==
Key

- Q = Qualifier
- WC = Wild card
- LL = Lucky loser
- Alt = Alternate
- ITF = ITF entry
- PR = Protected ranking
- SR = Special ranking
- SE = Special exempt
- JE = Junior exempt
- JR = Junior Accelerator Programme entrant
- CO = College Accelerator Programme entrant
- NG = Next Gen Accelerator Program entrant
- w/o = Walkover
- r = Retired
- d = Defaulted

=== Finals ===
Semifinals
(Chinese Taipei) Hsu Yu-hsiou | 3 | 0
(Estonia) Mark Lajal | 6 | 6
5 | (United States) Eliot Spizzirri | 1 | 6^{5}
WC | (United States) Andres Martin | 6 | 7^{7}

Final
(Estonia) Mark Lajal | 6^{7} | 7 | 7^{11}
WC | (United States) Andres Martin | 7^{9} | 5 | 6^{9}

=== Top half ===
First round
1 | (United States) N Basavareddy | 3 | 4
(Chinese Taipei) Y-h Hsu | 6 | 6
A Kachmazov | 6^{5} | 2
Q | (United States) A Mayo | 7^{7} | 6
Q | (United States) Patrick Maloney | 6^{11} | 2
Q | (Chinese Taipei) T-l Wu | 7^{13} | 6
WC | (United States) Nicolas Ian Kotzen | 6 | 3 | 4
7 | (Australia) L Tu | 4 | 6 | 6
3 | (Belgium) A Blockx | 6 | 6
Q | (Chinese Taipei) T-h Huang | 2 | 1
(Australia) A Bolt | 4 | 6 | 2
Q | (United Kingdom) A Fery | 6 | 4 | 6
(Estonia) M Lajal | 6 | 6
(Australia) O Jasika | 0 | 3
Q | (United States) G Johns | 1 | 4
6 | (Denmark) A Holmgren | 6 | 6

Second round
(Chinese Taipei) Y-h Hsu | 6 | 6
Q | (United States) A Mayo | 3 | 2
Q | (Chinese Taipei) T-l Wu | 3 | 7^{7} | 6
7 | (Australia) L Tu | 6 | 6^{2} | 4
3 | (Belgium) A Blockx | 4 | 3
Q | (United Kingdom) A Fery | 6 | 6
(Estonia) M Lajal | 6 | 6
6 | (Denmark) A Holmgren | 1 | 2

Quarterfinals
(Chinese Taipei) Y-h Hsu | 7^{7} | 3 | 7^{7}
Q | (Chinese Taipei) T-l Wu | 6^{5} | 6 | 6^{4}
Q | (United Kingdom) A Fery | 1 | 7 | 3
(Estonia) M Lajal | 6 | 5 | 6

Semifinals
(Chinese Taipei) Y-h Hsu | 3 | 0
(Estonia) M Lajal | 6 | 6

=== Bottom half ===
First round
5 | (United States) E Spizzirri | 3 | 6 | 6
NG | (Japan) R Sakamoto | 6 | 3 | 4
(Mexico) R Pacheco Méndez | 5 | 2
WC | (United States) M Zheng | 7 | 6
NG | (China) Y Zhou | 6 | 5 | 6
(Japan) S Shimabukuro | 3 | 7 | 4
(Japan) Y Uchiyama | 7^{7} | 6^{4} | 3
4 | (United States) C Eubanks | 6^{3} | 7^{7} | 6
8 | (Lebanon) H Habib | 2 | 2
WC | (United States) A Martin | 6 | 6
Alt | (Colombia) N Mejía | 4 | 2
(Japan) Y Shimizu | 6 | 6
(United States) P Kypson | 4 | 7^{7} | 3
(Canada) A Galarneau | 6 | 6^{2} | 6
(Japan) R Noguchi | 6 | 0
2 | (Japan) S Mochizuki | 4 | 0^{r}

Second round
5 | (United States) E Spizzirri | 6 | 4 | 7^{7}
WC | (United States) M Zheng | 4 | 6 | 6^{4}
NG | (China) Y Zhou | 7^{7} | 6
4 | (United States) C Eubanks | 6^{5} | 1
WC | (United States) A Martin | 7 | 6
(Japan) Y Shimizu | 5 | 3
(Canada) A Galarneau | 6 | 6
(Japan) R Noguchi | 1 | 4

Quarterfinals
5 | (United States) E Spizzirri | 6 | 6
NG | (China) Y Zhou | 1 | 2
WC | (United States) A Martin | 4 | 7^{8} | 6
(Canada) A Galarneau | 6 | 6^{6} | 1

Semifinals
5 | (United States) E Spizzirri | 1 | 6^{5}
WC | (United States) A Martin | 6 | 7^{7}
