= 2023 Cranbrook Tennis Classic – Singles =

Singles
- 2023 Cranbrook Tennis Classic

Final
- Champion: (United States) Steve Johnson
- Runner-up: (Kazakhstan) Mikhail Kukushkin
- Score: 6–4, 6–7^{(7–9)}, 7–6^{(7–4)}

Events
Singles	Doubles
Cranbrook Tennis Classic	· 2024 →

This was the first edition of the tournament.

Steve Johnson won the title after defeating Mikhail Kukushkin 6–4, 6–7^{(7–9)}, 7–6^{(7–4)} in the final.

== Seeds ==
1. (Australia) James Duckworth (second round)
2. (Ecuador) Emilio Gómez (second round)
3. (United States) Denis Kudla (quarterfinals)
4. (Turkey) Altuğ Çelikbilek (second round)
5. (Canada) Alexis Galarneau (second round)
6. (France) Giovanni Mpetshi Perricard (second round)
7. (United States) Steve Johnson (champion)
8. (Australia) Dane Sweeny (first round)

== Draw ==
=== Key ===
- Q = Qualifier
- WC = Wild card
- LL = Lucky loser
- Alt = Alternate
- ITF = ITF entry
- PR = Protected ranking
- SR = Special ranking
- SE = Special exempt
- JE = Junior exempt
- JR = Junior Accelerator Programme entrant
- CO = College Accelerator Programme entrant
- NG = Next Gen Accelerator Program entrant
- w/o = Walkover
- r = Retired
- d = Defaulted

=== Finals ===
Semifinals
(United States) Tennys Sandgren	4	1
(Kazakhstan) Mikhail Kukushkin	6	6
Q	(Australia) Tristan Schoolkate	4	2
7	(United States) Steve Johnson	6	6

Final
(Kazakhstan) Mikhail Kukushkin	4	7^{9}	6^{4}
7	(United States) Steve Johnson	6	6^{7}	7^{7}

=== Top half ===
First round
1	(Australia) J Duckworth	7^{7}	7
(Kazakhstan) B Zhukayev	6^{2}	5
(United States) T Sandgren	4	6	7^{7}
(United States) M Krueger	6	1	6^{5}
Q	(India) M Sasikumar	7	4	7^{7}
WC	(United States) E Quinn	5	6	6^{4}
(United States) E Spizzirri	6^{3}	3
5	(Canada) A Galarneau	7^{7}	6
3	(United States) D Kudla	6	5	6
Alt	(Tunisia) S Mansouri	3	7	3
WC	(Japan) K Nishikori	6	6
(Australia) A Walton	1	2
PR	(United States) C Harrison	2	7^{9}	6^{5}
(Kazakhstan) M Kukushkin	6	6^{7}	7^{7}
(United States) N Basavareddy	6	3	3
6	(France) G Mpetshi Perricard	3	6	6

Second round
1	(Australia) J Duckworth	4	6	4
(United States) T Sandgren	6	3	6
Q	(India) M Sasikumar	4	6	7
5	(Canada) A Galarneau	6	2	5
3	(United States) D Kudla	6	3	6
WC	(Japan) K Nishikori	4	6	3
(Kazakhstan) M Kukushkin	3	6	6
6	(France) G Mpetshi Perricard	6	3	2

Quarterfinals
(United States) T Sandgren	7	6
Q	(India) M Sasikumar	5	4
3	(United States) D Kudla	4	1
(Kazakhstan) M Kukushkin	6	6

Semifinals
(United States) T Sandgren	4	1
(Kazakhstan) M Kukushkin	6	6

=== Bottom half ===
First round
8	(Australia) D Sweeny	5	1
Q	(Australia) O Jasika	7	6
(Japan) Y Shimizu	7^{7}	4	6
Q	(Mexico) E Escobedo	6^{5}	6	3
Q	(United States) E Zhu	7^{7}	2	4
Q	(Australia) T Schoolkate	6^{0}	6	6
(Estonia) M Lajal	7^{7}	4	4
4	(Turkey) A Çelikbilek	6^{3}	6	6
7	(United States) S Johnson	7^{9}	6
Q	(United Kingdom) A McHugh	6^{7}	4
Alt	(Australia) J McCabe	6	6^{4}	7^{7}
(Jordan) A Shelbayh	3	7^{7}	6^{5}
(Japan) Y Uchiyama	6	6
(Australia) L Tu	1	3
WC	(United States) M Zheng	4	1
2	(Ecuador) E Gómez	6	6

Second round
Q	(Australia) O Jasika	6	6
(Japan) Y Shimizu	3	3
Q	(Australia) T Schoolkate	7^{7}	7
4	(Turkey) A Çelikbilek	6^{4}	5
7	(United States) S Johnson	6	6
Alt	(Australia) J McCabe	4	2
(Japan) Y Uchiyama	6	6
2	(Ecuador) E Gómez	2	4

Quarterfinals
Q	(Australia) O Jasika	4	3
Q	(Australia) T Schoolkate	6	6
7	(United States) S Johnson	6	6^{0}	7^{7}
(Japan) Y Uchiyama	4	7^{7}	6^{4}

Semifinals
Q	(Australia) T Schoolkate	4	2
7	(United States) S Johnson	6	6
