= 2024 Cranbrook Tennis Classic – Singles =

Singles
- 2024 Cranbrook Tennis Classic

Final
- Champion: (United States) Learner Tien
- Runner-up: (United States) Nishesh Basavareddy
- Score: 4–6, 6–3, 6–4

Events
Singles	Doubles
← 2023 ·	Cranbrook Tennis Classic	· 2025 →

Steve Johnson was the defending champion but chose not to defend his title after retiring from professional tennis earlier in the 2024 season.

Learner Tien won the title after defeating Nishesh Basavareddy 4–6, 6–3, 6–4 in the final.

== Seeds ==
1. (United States) J. J. Wolf (quarterfinals)
2. (United States) Emilio Nava (first round)
3. (Australia) Tristan Schoolkate (first round)
4. (Netherlands) Gijs Brouwer (quarterfinals)
5. (United States) Mitchell Krueger (first round)
6. (China) Bu Yunchaokete (second round)
7. (United States) Tristan Boyer (first round)
8. (Australia) Marc Polmans (first round)

== Draw ==
Key

- Q = Qualifier
- WC = Wild card
- LL = Lucky loser
- Alt = Alternate
- ITF = ITF entry
- PR = Protected ranking
- SR = Special ranking
- SE = Special exempt
- JE = Junior exempt
- JR = Junior Accelerator Programme entrant
- CO = College Accelerator Programme entrant
- NG = Next Gen Accelerator Program entrant
- w/o = Walkover
- r = Retired
- d = Defaulted

=== Finals ===
Semifinals
Q	(United States) Stefan Kozlov	2	0^{r}
Alt	(United States) Nishesh Basavareddy	6	2
Q	(United States) Ryan Seggerman	1	6	4
WC	(United States) Learner Tien	6	4	6

Final
Alt	(United States) Nishesh Basavareddy	6	3	4
WC	(United States) Learner Tien	4	6	6

=== Top half ===
First round
1	(United States) JJ Wolf	6	7
WC	(United States) A Martin	4	5
(Japan) Y Shimizu	1	7^{7}	6
(United States) Micah Braswell	6	6^{4}	1
Q	(United States) S Kozlov	4	7	6
WC	(United States) M Zheng	6	5	1
(Chinese Taipei) T-l Wu	6	7^{7}
7	(United States) T Boyer	2	6^{3}
3	(Australia) T Schoolkate	6	3	4
Q	(United States) Q Vandecasteele	4	6	6
(Australia) B Tomic	6^{1}	6	6
(Colombia) N Mejía	7^{7}	3	4
Alt	(Switzerland) A Bellier	2	6	6
(Japan) H Moriya	6	2	1
Alt	(United States) N Basavareddy	6	6
8	(Australia) M Polmans	4	2

Second round
1	(United States) JJ Wolf	6	6
(Japan) Y Shimizu	1	4
Q	(United States) S Kozlov	5	6	4
(Chinese Taipei) T-l Wu	7	3	0^{r}
Q	(United States) Q Vandecasteele	6	6^{3}	3
(Australia) B Tomic	1	7^{7}	6
Alt	(Switzerland) A Bellier	3	6	2
Alt	(United States) N Basavareddy	6	4	6

Quarterfinals
1	(United States) JJ Wolf	4	4
Q	(United States) S Kozlov	6	6
(Australia) B Tomic	4	0^{r}
Alt	(United States) N Basavareddy	6	0

Semifinals
Q	(United States) S Kozlov	2	0^{r}
Alt	(United States) N Basavareddy	6	2

=== Bottom half ===
First round
5	(United States) M Krueger	3	6	3
Q	(Mexico) E Escobedo	6	3	6
Q	(Japan) K Uchida	6^{3}	1
Q	(United States) R Seggerman	7^{7}	6
(United States) B Holt	3	4
(United States) T-S Kwiatkowski	6	6
Q	(United States) Christian Langmo	1	4
4	(Netherlands) G Brouwer	6	6
6	(China) Y Bu	6	6
(United Kingdom) R Peniston	4	4
(Japan) J Trotter	6	3	3
WC	(United States) L Tien	4	6	6
(United States) E Quinn	6	6
(United States) O Baris	2	2
(Australia) P Sekulic	6	2	7
2	(United States) E Nava	0	6	5

Second round
Q	(Mexico) E Escobedo	4	2
Q	(United States) R Seggerman	6	6
(United States) T-S Kwiatkowski	7^{8}	2	3
4	(Netherlands) G Brouwer	6^{6}	6	6
6	(China) Y Bu	6	5	0
WC	(United States) L Tien	0	7	6
(United States) E Quinn	6	5	6^{4}
(Australia) P Sekulic	3	7	7^{7}

Quarterfinals
Q	(United States) R Seggerman	6	6
4	(Netherlands) G Brouwer	4	4
WC	(United States) L Tien	4	7^{7}	6
(Australia) P Sekulic	6	6^{4}	3

Semifinals
Q	(United States) R Seggerman	1	6	4
WC	(United States) L Tien	6	4	6
