= 2026 Cranbrook Tennis Classic – Doubles =

Doubles
- 2026 Cranbrook Tennis Classic

Final
- Champions: (United States) Trey Hilderbrand (United States) JJ Tracy
- Runners-up: (Thailand) Pruchya Isaro (India) Niki Kaliyanda Poonacha
- Score: 6–3, 7–6^{(7–2)}

Events
Singles	Doubles
- Cranbrook Tennis Classic

Hsu Yu-hsiou and Huang Tsung-hao were the defending champions but chose not to defend their title.

Trey Hilderbrand and JJ Tracy won the title after defeating Pruchya Isaro and Niki Kaliyanda Poonacha 6–3, 7–6^{(7–2)} in the final.

== Seeds ==
1. (United States) Trey Hilderbrand / (United States) JJ Tracy (champions)
2. (New Zealand) Finn Reynolds / (New Zealand) James Watt (semifinals)
3. (Thailand) Pruchya Isaro / (India) Niki Kaliyanda Poonacha (final)
4. (Uruguay) Ariel Behar / (India) Anirudh Chandrasekar (quarterfinals)

== Draw ==
Key

- Q = Qualifier
- WC = Wild card
- LL = Lucky loser
- Alt = Alternate
- ITF = ITF entry
- PR = Protected ranking
- SR = Special ranking
- SE = Special exempt
- JE = Junior exempt
- JR = Junior Accelerator Programme entrant
- CO = College Accelerator Programme entrant
- NG = Next Gen Accelerator Program entrant
- w/o = Walkover
- r = Retired
- d = Defaulted

First round
1	(United States) T Hilderbrand (United States) JJ Tracy	6	7^{7}
(United States) G Goldhoff (Canada) C Harper	3	6^{4}
WC	(United States) Owen DeMuth (United States) A Martin	1	2
(Spain) P Llamas Ruiz (Jordan) A Shelbayh	6	6
4	(Uruguay) A Behar (India) A Chandrasekar	7	6
WC	(United States) Matt Kuhar (United States) E Zhu	5	4
(Switzerland) R Bertola (Tunisia) M Echargui	3	2
(Antigua and Barbuda) J Maginley (United States) K Poling	6	6
(United States) N Lammons (United States) J Withrow	6	4	[10]
Alt	(Mexico) H Hach Verdugo (Venezuela) LD Martínez	4	6	[7]
Alt	(United States) S Kozlov (Venezuela) B Pérez	2	6^{0}
3	(Thailand) P Isaro (India) N Kaliyanda Poonacha	6	7^{7}
(Chinese Taipei) J Jung (United States) E King	3	6^{9}
(Australia) C Puttergill (Australia) D Sweeny	6	7^{11}
(Australia) B Bayldon (Australia) P Harper	5	4
2	(New Zealand) F Reynolds (New Zealand) J Watt	7	6

Quarterfinals
1	(United States) T Hilderbrand (United States) JJ Tracy	w/o
(Spain) P Llamas Ruiz (Jordan) A Shelbayh
4	(Uruguay) A Behar (India) A Chandrasekar	3	4
(Antigua and Barbuda) J Maginley (United States) K Poling	6	6
(United States) N Lammons (United States) J Withrow	4	6	[13]
3	(Thailand) P Isaro (India) N Kaliyanda Poonacha	6	0	[15]
(Australia) C Puttergill (Australia) D Sweeny	4	2
2	(New Zealand) F Reynolds (New Zealand) J Watt	6	6

Semifinals
1	(United States) T Hilderbrand (United States) JJ Tracy	2	7^{7}	[10]
(Antigua and Barbuda) J Maginley (United States) K Poling	6	6^{5}	[8]
3	(Thailand) P Isaro (India) N Kaliyanda Poonacha	6^{2}	7^{9}	[11]
2	(New Zealand) F Reynolds (New Zealand) J Watt	7^{7}	6^{7}	[9]

Final
1	(United States) T Hilderbrand (United States) JJ Tracy	6	7^{7}
3	(Thailand) P Isaro (India) N Kaliyanda Poonacha	3	6^{2}
