= 2026 Cranbrook Tennis Classic – Singles =

Singles
- 2026 Cranbrook Tennis Classic

Final
- Champion: (United States) Alex Michelsen
- Runner-up: (United Kingdom) Jacob Fearnley
- Score: 7–6^{(7–4)}, 6–3

Events
Singles	Doubles
- Cranbrook Tennis Classic

Mark Lajal was the defending champion but lost in the quarterfinals to Alex Michelsen.

Michelsen won the title after defeating Jacob Fearnley 7–6^{(7–4)}, 6–3 in the final.

== Seeds ==
1. (United States) Alex Michelsen (champion)
2. (Australia) Adam Walton (quarterfinals)
3. (China) Bu Yunchaokete (withdrew)
4. (Hong Kong) Coleman Wong (second round)
5. (Spain) Pablo Llamas Ruiz (second round)
6. (United States) Michael Zheng (semifinals)
7. (Australia) Dane Sweeny (first round)
8. (United Kingdom) Jacob Fearnley (final)

== Draw ==
Key

- Q = Qualifier
- WC = Wild card
- LL = Lucky loser
- Alt = Alternate
- ITF = ITF entry
- PR = Protected ranking
- SR = Special ranking
- SE = Special exempt
- JE = Junior exempt
- JR = Junior Accelerator Programme entrant
- CO = College Accelerator Programme entrant
- NG = Next Gen Accelerator Program entrant
- w/o = Walkover
- r = Retired
- d = Defaulted

=== Finals ===
Semifinals
1/WC	(United States) Alex Michelsen	6	6^{5}	6
LL	(India) Dhakshineswar Suresh	2	7^{7}	2
8	(United Kingdom) Jacob Fearnley	6	6
6	(United States) Michael Zheng	3	4

Final
1/WC	(United States) Alex Michelsen	7^{7}	6
8	(United Kingdom) Jacob Fearnley	6^{4}	3

=== Top half ===
First round
1/WC	(United States) A Michelsen	6	6^{4}	7^{7}
LL	(United States) A Mayo	3	7^{7}	6^{5}
(Tunisia) M Echargui	4	4
(South Africa) L Harris	6	6
(Estonia) M Lajal	6	5	6
NG	(United States) Dar Blanch	4	7	4
Q	(United States) B Kuzuhara	3	4
5	(Spain) P Llamas Ruiz	6	6
Q	(United States) S Gorzny	2	2
(Croatia) B Gojo	6	6
LL	(India) D Suresh	6	6
(United Kingdom) B Harris	2	4
Q	(Spain) Roger Pascual Ferrà	6	6
Q	(Japan) M Imamura	1	1
Alt	(United States) A Martin	4	6	7^{8}
7	(Australia) D Sweeny	6	3	6^{6}

Second round
1/WC	(United States) A Michelsen	6	6
(South Africa) L Harris	3	3
(Estonia) M Lajal	6	4	7^{7}
5	(Spain) P Llamas Ruiz	2	6	6^{5}
(Croatia) B Gojo	2	4
LL	(India) D Suresh	6	6
Q	(Spain) R Pascual Ferrà	3	6	3
Alt	(United States) A Martin	6	1	6

Quarterfinals
1/WC	(United States) A Michelsen	6	6
(Estonia) M Lajal	3	4
LL	(India) D Suresh	3	7^{7}	7^{8}
Alt	(United States) A Martin	6	6^{4}	6^{6}

Semifinals
1/WC	(United States) A Michelsen	6	6^{5}	6
LL	(India) D Suresh	2	7^{7}	2

=== Bottom half ===
First round
8	(United Kingdom) J Fearnley	6	6
(Switzerland) R Bertola	4	4
(Australia) B Tomic	3^{r}
(United States) T Boyer	1
(United States) C Smith	6^{1}	3
PR	(United States) JJ Wolf	7^{7}	6
WC	(United States) Spencer Johnson	2	4
4	(Hong Kong) C Wong	6	6
6	(United States) M Zheng	6	6
(Jordan) A Shelbayh	4	1
LL	(United States) S Kozlov	6	1	6^{4}
Q	(Mexico) A Magadán	3	6	7^{7}
Q	(United States) E Zhu	3	3
WC	(Australia) T Kokkinakis	6	6
Alt	(Jamaica) B Bicknell	6	1	1^{r}
2	(Australia) A Walton	3	6	3

Second round
8	(United Kingdom) J Fearnley	6	6
(United States) T Boyer	4	4
PR	(United States) JJ Wolf	6	7
4	(Hong Kong) C Wong	3	5
6	(United States) M Zheng	7	6
Q	(Mexico) A Magadán	5	3
WC	(Australia) T Kokkinakis	6	3	6^{3}
2	(Australia) A Walton	2	6	7^{7}

Quarterfinals
8	(United Kingdom) J Fearnley	7^{7}	4	6
PR	(United States) JJ Wolf	6^{5}	6	3
6	(United States) M Zheng	4	7^{7}	6
2	(Australia) A Walton	6	6^{4}	3

Semifinals
8	(United Kingdom) J Fearnley	6	6
6	(United States) M Zheng	3	4
