= 2024 Cranbrook Tennis Classic – Doubles =

Doubles
- 2024 Cranbrook Tennis Classic

Final
- Champions: (United States) Ryan Seggerman (United States) Patrik Trhac
- Runners-up: (United States) Ozan Baris (United States) Nishesh Basavareddy
- Score: 4–6, 6–3, [10–6]

Events
| Singles | Doubles |
| ← 2023 · | Cranbrook Tennis Classic | · 2025 → |

Tristan Schoolkate and Adam Walton were the defending champions but only Schoolkate chose to defend his title, partnering Gijs Brouwer. They withdrew before their semifinal match against Ozan Baris and Nishesh Basavareddy.

Ryan Seggerman and Patrik Trhac won the title after defeating Baris and Basavareddy 4–6, 6–3, [10–6] in the final.

== Seeds ==
1. (United States) Ryan Seggerman / (United States) Patrik Trhac (champions)
2. (United States) Vasil Kirkov / (Japan) James Trotter (first round)
3. (United States) Mac Kiger / (Canada) Benjamin Sigouin (first round)
4. (Mexico) Hans Hach Verdugo / (United States) Mitchell Krueger (first round)

== Draw ==
Key

- Q = Qualifier
- WC = Wild card
- LL = Lucky loser
- Alt = Alternate
- ITF = ITF entry
- PR = Protected ranking
- SR = Special ranking
- SE = Special exempt
- JE = Junior exempt
- JR = Junior Accelerator Programme entrant
- CO = College Accelerator Programme entrant
- NG = Next Gen Accelerator Program entrant
- w/o = Walkover
- r = Retired
- d = Defaulted

=== Draw ===
First round
1 | (United States) R Seggerman (United States) P Trhac | 7 | 3 | [10]
(Colombia) N Mejía (Colombia) A Urrea | 5 | 6 | [4]
(United States) J Sheehy (Canada) K Stevenson | 6^{5} | 2
(Australia) M Polmans (Japan) Y Shimizu | 7^{7} | 6
3 | (United States) M Kiger (Canada) B Sigouin | 6^{7} | 6 | [3]
(Switzerland) A Bellier (United Kingdom) R Peniston | 7^{9} | 3 | [10]
(United States) T-S Kwiatkowski (United States) A Lawson | 6 | 5 | [10]
PR | (United States) T Boyer (United States) D Novikov | 4 | 7 | [12]
WC | (United States) Owen DeMuth (United States) A Martin | 6^{1} | 1
(Netherlands) G Brouwer (Australia) T Schoolkate | 7^{7} | 6
(Japan) Ryuki Matsuda (Japan) H Moriya | 4 | 6 | [10]
4 | (Mexico) H Hach Verdugo (United States) M Krueger | 6 | 2 | [5]
WC | (United States) O Baris (United States) N Basavareddy | 0 | 6 | [10]
(Australia) K Pearson (New Zealand) F Reynolds | 6 | 1 | [5]
(Japan) K Uchida (Chinese Taipei) T-l Wu | 6 | 7^{7}
2 | (United States) V Kirkov (Japan) J Trotter | 4 | 6^{4}

Quarterfinals
1 | (United States) R Seggerman (United States) P Trhac | 7 | 6
(Australia) M Polmans (Japan) Y Shimizu | 5 | 4
(Switzerland) A Bellier (United Kingdom) R Peniston | 6 | 6^{8} | 4
PR | (United States) T Boyer (United States) D Novikov | 2 | 7^{10} | 6
(Netherlands) G Brouwer (Australia) T Schoolkate | 6 | 4 | [10]
(Japan) R Matsuda (Japan) H Moriya | 1 | 6 | [5]
WC | (United States) O Baris (United States) N Basavareddy | 7^{7} | 7
(Japan) K Uchida (Chinese Taipei) T-l Wu | 6^{4} | 5

Semifinals
1 | (United States) R Seggerman (United States) P Trhac | 7 | 7^{10}
PR | (United States) T Boyer (United States) D Novikov | 5 | 6^{8}
(Netherlands) G Brouwer (Australia) T Schoolkate
WC | (United States) O Baris (United States) N Basavareddy | w/o

Final
1 | (United States) R Seggerman (United States) P Trhac | 4 | 6 | [10]
WC | (United States) O Baris (United States) N Basavareddy | 6 | 3 | [6]
