= 2025 Cranbrook Tennis Classic =

- Date: 21 – 27 July
- Edition: 3rd
- Surface: Hard
- Location: Bloomfield Hills, Michigan, United States

Champions

Singles
- (Estonia) Mark Lajal

Doubles
- (Chinese Taipei) Hsu Yu-hsiou / (Chinese Taipei) Huang Tsung-hao
- Cranbrook Tennis Classic

The 2025 Cranbrook Tennis Classic was a professional tennis tournament played on hardcourts. It was the third edition of the tournament which was part of the 2025 ATP Challenger Tour. It took place in Bloomfield Hills, Michigan, United States between July 21 and July 27, 2025.

== Singles main-draw entrants ==
=== Seeds ===
Country	Player	Rank^{1}	Seed
USA	Nishesh Basavareddy	111	1
JPN	Shintaro Mochizuki	125	2
BEL	Alexander Blockx	128	3
USA	Christopher Eubanks	130	4
USA	Eliot Spizzirri	132	5
DEN	August Holmgren	146	6
AUS	Li Tu	160	7
LBN	Hady Habib	172	8

- ^{1} Rankings are as of July 14, 2025.

=== Other entrants ===
The following players received wildcards into the singles main draw:

- (United States) Nicolas Ian Kotzen
- (United States) Andres Martin
- (United States) Michael Zheng

The following players received entry into the singles main draw through the Next Gen Accelerator programme:

- (Japan) Rei Sakamoto
- (China) Zhou Yi

The following player received entry into the singles main draw as an alternate:

- (Colombia) Nicolás Mejía

The following players received entry from the qualifying draw:

- (United Kingdom) Arthur Fery
- (Chinese Taipei) Huang Tsung-hao
- (United States) Garrett Johns
- (United States) Patrick Maloney
- (United States) Aidan Mayo
- (Chinese Taipei) Wu Tung-lin

== Champions ==
=== Singles ===
- (Estonia) Mark Lajal def. (United States) Andres Martin 6–7^{(7–9)}, 7–5, 7–6^{(11–9)}.

=== Doubles ===
- (Chinese Taipei) Hsu Yu-hsiou / (Chinese Taipei) Huang Tsung-hao def. (United States) Theodore Winegar / (United States) Michael Zheng 4–6, 6–3, [11–9].
