= 2023 Cranbrook Tennis Classic – Doubles =

Doubles
- 2023 Cranbrook Tennis Classic

Final
- Champions: (Australia) Tristan Schoolkate (Australia) Adam Walton
- Runners-up: (Australia) Blake Ellis (Australia) Calum Puttergill
- Score: 7–5, 6–3

Events
Singles	Doubles
Cranbrook Tennis Classic	· 2024 →

This was the first edition of the tournament.

Tristan Schoolkate and Adam Walton won the title after defeating Blake Ellis and Calum Puttergill 7–5, 6–3 in the final.

== Seeds ==
1. (South Korea) Nam Ji-sung / (New Zealand) Artem Sitak (quarterfinals)
2. (India) Purav Raja / (India) Divij Sharan (quarterfinals)
3. (Japan) Yuta Shimizu / (Canada) Benjamin Sigouin (first round)
4. (United States) Mitchell Krueger / (United States) Alex Lawson (first round)

== Draw ==
Key

- Q = Qualifier
- WC = Wild card
- LL = Lucky loser
- Alt = Alternate
- ITF = ITF entry
- PR = Protected ranking
- SR = Special ranking
- SE = Special exempt
- JE = Junior exempt
- JR = Junior Accelerator Programme entrant
- CO = College Accelerator Programme entrant
- NG = Next Gen Accelerator Program entrant
- w/o = Walkover
- r = Retired
- d = Defaulted

First round
1	(South Korea) J-s Nam (New Zealand) A Sitak	6^{5}	6	[13]
WC	(United States) Owen DeMuth (United States) A Martin	7^{7}	1	[11]
(Tunisia) S Mansouri (Jordan) A Shelbayh	5	2
PR	(United States) C Harrison (United Kingdom) A McHugh	7	6
4	(United States) M Krueger (United States) A Lawson	6^{5}	4
(Australia) T Schoolkate (Australia) A Walton	7^{7}	6
(India) M Sasikumar (Australia) L Tu
(United Kingdom) S Duncan (Canada) K Stevenson	w/o
(South Korea) Y-s Chung (Australia) J McCabe	3	4
(Australia) O Jasika (Japan) H Moriya	6	6
(United States) A Ayeni (United States) Ezekiel Clark	7^{7}	6
3	(Japan) Y Shimizu (Canada) B Sigouin	6^{5}	2
(Australia) B Ellis (Australia) C Puttergill	3	7	[10]
(Northern Mariana Islands) C Sinclair (Australia) D Sweeny	6	5	[8]
WC	(United States) M Kiger (United States) C Kingsley	4	6	[3]
2	(India) P Raja (India) D Sharan	6	4	[10]

Quarterfinals
1	(South Korea) J-s Nam (New Zealand) A Sitak	6^{3}	6^{6}
PR	(United States) C Harrison (United Kingdom) A McHugh	7^{7}	7^{8}
(Australia) T Schoolkate (Australia) A Walton	6	7^{7}
(United Kingdom) S Duncan (Canada) K Stevenson	3	6^{2}
(Australia) O Jasika (Japan) H Moriya	3	6	[10]
(United States) A Ayeni (United States) E Clark	6	2	[7]
(Australia) B Ellis (Australia) C Puttergill	6	5	[13]
2	(India) P Raja (India) D Sharan	2	7	[11]

Semifinals
PR	(United States) C Harrison (United Kingdom) A McHugh	6	4	[8]
(Australia) T Schoolkate (Australia) A Walton	1	6	[10]
(Australia) O Jasika (Japan) H Moriya	3	4
(Australia) B Ellis (Australia) C Puttergill	6	6

Final
(Australia) T Schoolkate (Australia) A Walton	7	6
(Australia) B Ellis (Australia) C Puttergill	5	3
