= 2026 Cranbrook Tennis Classic =

- Date: July 20–26
- Edition: 4th
- Surface: Hard
- Location: Bloomfield Hills, Michigan, United States

Champions

Singles
- (United States) Alex Michelsen

Doubles
- (United States) Trey Hilderbrand / (United States) JJ Tracy
- Cranbrook Tennis Classic

The 2026 Cranbrook Tennis Classic was a professional tennis tournament played on hardcourts. It was the fourth edition of the tournament which was part of the 2026 ATP Challenger Tour. It took place in Bloomfield Hills, Michigan, United States between July 20 and July 26, 2026.

== Singles main-draw entrants ==
=== Seeds ===
| Country | Player | Rank^{1} | Seed |
|---|---|---|---|
| USA | Alex Michelsen | 46 | 1 |
| AUS | Adam Walton | 79 | 2 |
| ~~CHN~~ | ~~Bu Yunchaokete~~ | ~~109~~ | ~~3~~ |
| HKG | Coleman Wong | 111 | 4 |
| ESP | Pablo Llamas Ruiz | 116 | 5 |
| USA | Michael Zheng | 121 | 6 |
| AUS | Dane Sweeny | 122 | 7 |
| GBR | Jacob Fearnley | 123 | 8 |

- ^{1} Rankings are as of July 13, 2026.

=== Other entrants ===
The following players received wildcards into the singles main draw:

- (United States) Spencer Johnson
- (Australia) Thanasi Kokkinakis
- (United States) Alex Michelsen

The following player received entry into the singles main draw using a protected ranking:

- (United States) J. J. Wolf

The following player received entry into the singles main draw through the Next Gen Accelerator programme:

- (United States) Darwin Blanch

The following players received entry into the singles main draw as alternates:

- (Jamaica) Blaise Bicknell
- (United States) Andres Martin

The following players received entry from the qualifying draw:

- (United States) Sebastian Gorzny
- (Japan) Masamichi Imamura
- (United States) Bruno Kuzuhara
- (Mexico) Alan Magadán
- (Spain) Roger Pascual Ferrà
- (United States) Evan Zhu

The following players received entry as lucky losers:

- (United States) Stefan Kozlov
- (United States) Aidan Mayo
- (India) Dhakshineswar Suresh

== Champions ==
=== Singles ===
- (United States) Alex Michelsen def. (United Kingdom) Jacob Fearnley 7–6^{(7–4)}, 6–3.

=== Doubles ===
- (United States) Trey Hilderbrand / (United States) JJ Tracy def. (Thailand) Pruchya Isaro / (India) Niki Kaliyanda Poonacha 6–3, 7–6^{(7–2)}.
