= 2023 Cranbrook Tennis Classic =

- Date: 3 – 9 July
- Edition: 1st
- Surface: Hard
- Location: Bloomfield Hills, Michigan, United States

Champions

Singles
- (United States) Steve Johnson

Doubles
- (Australia) Tristan Schoolkate / (Australia) Adam Walton
Cranbrook Tennis Classic	· 2024 →

The 2023 Cranbrook Tennis Classic was a professional tennis tournament played on hardcourts. It was the first edition of the tournament which was part of the 2023 ATP Challenger Tour. It took place in Bloomfield Hills, Michigan, United States between July 3 and July 9, 2023.

== Singles main-draw entrants ==
=== Seeds ===
Country	Player	Rank^{1}	Seed
AUS	James Duckworth	109	1
ECU	Emilio Gómez	127	2
USA	Denis Kudla	179	3
TUR	Altuğ Çelikbilek	208	4
CAN	Alexis Galarneau	213	5
FRA	Giovanni Mpetshi Perricard	216	6
USA	Steve Johnson	217	7
AUS	Dane Sweeny	229	8

- ^{1} Rankings are as of 26 June 2023.

=== Other entrants ===
The following players received wildcards into the singles main draw:

- (Japan) Kei Nishikori
- (United States) Ethan Quinn
- (United States) Michael Zheng

The following player received entry into the singles main draw using a protected ranking:

- (United States) Christian Harrison

The following players received entry into the singles main draw as alternates:

- (Tunisia) Skander Mansouri
- (Australia) James McCabe

The following players received entry from the qualifying draw:

- (Mexico) Ernesto Escobedo
- (Australia) Omar Jasika
- (United Kingdom) Aidan McHugh
- (India) Mukund Sasikumar
- (Australia) Tristan Schoolkate
- (United States) Evan Zhu

== Champions ==
=== Singles ===
- (United States) Steve Johnson def. (Kazakhstan) Mikhail Kukushkin 6–4, 6–7^{(7–9)}, 7–6^{(7–4)}.

=== Doubles ===
- (Australia) Tristan Schoolkate / (Australia) Adam Walton def. (Australia) Blake Ellis / (Australia) Calum Puttergill 7–5, 6–3.
