= 2026 French Open – Men's singles =

Tennis championship

Men's singles
- 2026 French Open

Final
- Champion: (Germany) Alexander Zverev
- Runner-up: (Italy) Flavio Cobolli
- Score: 6–1, 4–6, 6–4, 6–7^{(5–7)}, 6–1
- Date: 7 June 2026

Details
- Draw: 128 (16Q / 8WC / 3LL)
- Seeds: 32

Events
Singles	men	women		boys	girls
Doubles	men	women	mixed	boys	girls
WC Singles	men	women	quad	boys	girls
WC Doubles	men	women	quad	boys	girls

Qualification
Singles	men	women
- French Open

Alexander Zverev defeated Flavio Cobolli in the final, 6–1, 4–6, 6–4, 6–7^{(5–7)}, 6–1 to win the men's singles tennis title at the 2026 French Open. It was his first major title, following three previous runner-up finishes. Zverev was the first German man to win the French Open since Henner Henkel in 1937 and the first to win any singles major since Boris Becker at the 1996 Australian Open. By reaching the final, Cobolli made his top 10 debut in the ATP rankings. This marked the third consecutive year that the men's singles final went to five sets.

Carlos Alcaraz was the two-time reigning champion, but withdrew before the tournament due to a wrist injury. This marked Alcaraz's first absence from a major since the 2023 Australian Open.

Jannik Sinner's loss to Juan Manuel Cerúndolo in the second round ended a streak of nine consecutive major titles won between him and Alcaraz, dating to the 2024 Australian Open, as well as his career-best winning streak of 30 matches. It marked the first time since 2000 that the reigning world No. 1 failed to reach the third round of the French Open. At 5 hours and 58 minutes, the third-round match between Cerúndolo and Martín Landaluce was the longest match at any major with a final-set tiebreak. It was the third-longest match in the tournament's history.

By making his 82nd major appearance, Novak Djokovic set the record for the most total major main draw appearances. Djokovic's defeat to João Fonseca in the third round marked only the second time (after the 2010 French Open) that he lost at a major after leading two sets to love, and the first time since 2009 that he failed to reach the quarterfinals at the French Open. Djokovic's defeat guaranteed a first-time Grand Slam men's singles champion. This marked the first time in the Open Era that no former major champions had reached the round-of-16 stage of a major, and the first major to have no former champions reach the semifinals of both the men's and women's singles events since the 1977 French Open.

This was the first time since the 2022 Wimbledon Championships, and the third time overall in the Open Era (after the 1992 Australian Open) that a semifinal match at a major resulted in a walkover.

Félix Auger-Aliassime became the first Canadian player to reach the quarterfinals of all four majors. For the first time in the Open Era, three Italian men (Cobolli, Matteo Arnaldi and Matteo Berrettini) reached the quarterfinals of a single major. Ranked No. 105, Berrettini was the lowest-ranked quarterfinalist at the French Open since Igor Andreev in 2007. Fonseca was the first Brazilian man to reach the quarterfinals at the French Open since Gustavo Kuerten in 2004. Jesper de Jong was the third lucky loser in the Open Era to reach the fourth round of the French Open, and the first since David Goffin in 2012. Also entering as a lucky loser, Coleman Wong became the first player from Hong Kong to participate in the main draw of the French Open in the Open Era. Moïse Kouamé was the youngest male player to reach the third round of a major since Rafael Nadal at the 2003 Wimbledon Championships.

This tournament marked the final French Open appearances of 2015 champion, three-time major champion and former world No. 3 Stan Wawrinka, and former world No. 6 Gaël Monfils. Both players lost in the first round, to de Jong and Hugo Gaston, respectively.

== Seeds ==
1. (Italy) Jannik Sinner (second round)
2. (Germany) Alexander Zverev (champion)
3. (Serbia) Novak Djokovic (third round)
4. (Canada) Félix Auger-Aliassime (quarterfinals)
5. (United States) Ben Shelton (second round)
6. Daniil Medvedev (first round)
7. (United States) Taylor Fritz (first round)
8. (Australia) Alex de Minaur (third round)
9. (Kazakhstan) Alexander Bublik (first round)
10. (Italy) Flavio Cobolli (final)
11. Andrey Rublev (fourth round)
12. (Czech Republic) Jiří Lehečka (first round)
13. Karen Khachanov (third round)
14. (Italy) Luciano Darderi (second round)
15. (Norway) Casper Ruud (fourth round)
16. (Monaco) Valentin Vacherot (second round, withdrew)
17. (France) Arthur Fils (withdrew)
18. (United States) Learner Tien (third round)
19. (United States) Frances Tiafoe (fourth round)
20. (United Kingdom) Cameron Norrie (first round, retired)
21. (Spain) Alejandro Davidovich Fokina (second round)
22. (France) Arthur Rinderknech (second round)
23. (Argentina) Tomás Martín Etcheverry (first round)
24. (United States) Tommy Paul (third round)
25. (Argentina) Francisco Cerúndolo (third round)
26. (Czech Republic) Jakub Menšík (semifinals)
27. (Spain) Rafael Jódar (quarterfinals)
28. (Brazil) João Fonseca (quarterfinals)
29. (Netherlands) Tallon Griekspoor (first round)
30. (France) Corentin Moutet (first round)
31. (United States) Brandon Nakashima (third round)
32. (France) Ugo Humbert (second round)

== Draw ==
Key

- Q = Qualifier
- WC = Wild card
- LL = Lucky loser
- Alt = Alternate
- ITF = ITF entry
- PR = Protected ranking
- SR = Special ranking
- SE = Special exempt
- JE = Junior exempt
- JR = Junior Accelerator Programme entrant
- CO = College Accelerator Programme entrant
- NG = Next Gen Accelerator Program entrant
- w/o = Walkover
- r = Retired
- d = Defaulted

=== Finals ===
Quarterfinals
(Italy) Matteo Berrettini	5	2^{r}
(Italy) Matteo Arnaldi	7	5
4	(Canada) Félix Auger-Aliassime	6	4	4	4
10	(Italy) Flavio Cobolli	4	6	6	6
26	(Czech Republic) Jakub Menšík	6	6	7^{7}
28	(Brazil) João Fonseca	4	3	6^{3}
27	(Spain) Rafael Jódar	6^{3}	1	3
2	(Germany) Alexander Zverev	7^{7}	6	6

Semifinals
(Italy) Matteo Arnaldi
10	(Italy) Flavio Cobolli	w/o
26	(Czech Republic) Jakub Menšík	5	2	6	3
2	(Germany) Alexander Zverev	7	6	3	6

Final
10	(Italy) Flavio Cobolli	1	6	4	7^{7}	1
2	(Germany) Alexander Zverev	6	4	6	6^{5}	6

=== Top half ===
==== Section 1 ====
First round
1	(Italy) J Sinner	6	6	6
WC	(France) C Tabur	1	3	4
(United Kingdom) J Fearnley	2	6^{0}	6^{7}
(Argentina) JM Cerúndolo	6	7^{7}	7^{9}
(Spain) M Landaluce	6	4	6	6^{3}	6
Q	(Bolivia) JC Prado Ángelo	3	6	2	7^{7}	4
(Czech Republic) V Kopřiva	6	5	6	3	6
30	(France) C Moutet	3	7	4	6	3
22	(France) A Rinderknech	7^{7}	6	6
Q	(Austria) J Rodionov	6^{5}	2	3
(Hungary) M Fucsovics	7^{7}	5	1	2
(Italy) M Berrettini	6^{2}	7	6	6
(United States) E Quinn	4	6^{8}	6^{4}
(Argentina) F Comesaña	6	7^{10}	7^{7}
(Austria) S Ofner	6^{5}	2	3
14	(Italy) L Darderi	7^{7}	6	6

Second round
1	(Italy) J Sinner	6	6	5	1	1
(Argentina) JM Cerúndolo	3	2	7	6	6
(Spain) M Landaluce	1	2	6	7	6
(Czech Republic) V Kopřiva	6	6	4	5	0
22	(France) A Rinderknech	4	4	4
(Italy) M Berrettini	6	6	6
(Argentina) F Comesaña	7^{7}	4	6	2	6
14	(Italy) L Darderi	6^{5}	6	4	6	4

Third round
(Argentina) JM Cerúndolo	6	6^{7}	7^{7}	6^{4}	7^{10}
(Spain) M Landaluce	4	7^{9}	6^{4}	7^{7}	6^{8}
(Italy) M Berrettini	7^{7}	5	6^{4}	6	7^{15}
(Argentina) F Comesaña	6^{3}	7	7^{7}	4	6^{13}

Fourth round
(Argentina) JM Cerúndolo	3	6^{2}	6^{6}
(Italy) M Berrettini	6	7^{7}	7^{8}

==== Section 2 ====
First round
9	(Kazakhstan) A Bublik	5	7^{8}	4	5
(Germany) J-L Struff	7	6^{6}	6	7
Q	(Portugal) J Faria	6	7	6
(Canada) D Shapovalov	4	5	4
(Spain) J Munar	3	3	6	3
(Poland) H Hurkacz	6	6	2	6
(United States) E Spizzirri	3	7^{7}	4	3
19	(United States) F Tiafoe	6	6^{5}	6	6
29	(Netherlands) T Griekspoor	7^{11}	3	6^{6}	3
(Italy) M Arnaldi	6^{9}	6	7^{8}	6
(France) A Müller	2	0^{r}
(Greece) S Tsitsipas	6	3
(Belgium) R Collignon	6	6	7^{7}
(Australia) A Vukic	3	3	6^{4}
(Spain) D Mérida	3	3	4
5	(United States) B Shelton	6	6	6

Second round
(Germany) J-L Struff	5	6^{1}	2
Q	(Portugal) J Faria	7	7^{7}	6
(Poland) H Hurkacz	7^{7}	6^{5}	4	7^{7}	4
19	(United States) F Tiafoe	6^{5}	7^{7}	6	6^{1}	6
(Italy) M Arnaldi	7^{7}	5	6	6
(Greece) S Tsitsipas	6^{2}	7	3	2
(Belgium) R Collignon	6	7	6
5	(United States) B Shelton	4	5	4

Third round
Q	(Portugal) J Faria	6	7^{7}	6^{4}	1	2
19	(United States) F Tiafoe	4	6^{2}	7^{7}	6	6
(Italy) M Arnaldi	6	6^{5}	5	6	7^{10}
(Belgium) R Collignon	4	7^{7}	7	4	6^{4}

Fourth round
19	(United States) F Tiafoe	6^{5}	7^{7}	6	6^{3}	4
(Italy) M Arnaldi	7^{7}	6^{5}	3	7^{7}	6

==== Section 3 ====
First round
4	(Canada) F Auger-Aliassime	4	6	4	6	7^{10}
(Germany) D Altmaier	6	4	6	1	6^{7}
(Argentina) S Báez	6	5	2	0^{r}
(Argentina) RA Burruchaga	2	7	6	2
(France) L Van Assche	6	6	2	7
LL	(Lithuania) V Gaubas	4	2	6	5
(Spain) R Bautista Agut	2	5	2
31	(United States) B Nakashima	6	7	6
20	(United Kingdom) C Norrie	6^{7}	0^{r}
(Paraguay) AD Vallejo	7^{9}	2
(Croatia) M Čilić	6^{4}	2	1
WC	(France) M Kouamé	7^{7}	6	6
(Chile) A Tabilo	6	6	6
(Poland) K Majchrzak	1	3	4
Q	(France) T Faurel	3	4	6	6^{6}
16	(Monaco) V Vacherot	6	6	3	7^{8}

Second round
4	(Canada) F Auger-Aliassime	4	6	7	6
(Argentina) RA Burruchaga	6	0	5	1
(France) L Van Assche	7^{7}	4	7	1	3
31	(United States) B Nakashima	6^{5}	6	5	6	6
(Paraguay) AD Vallejo	3	5	6	6	6^{8}
WC	(France) M Kouamé	6	7	3	2	7^{10}
(Chile) A Tabilo	w/o
16	(Monaco) V Vacherot

Third round
4	(Canada) F Auger-Aliassime	5	6	7^{7}	7^{7}
31	(United States) B Nakashima	7	1	6^{4}	6^{1}
WC	(France) M Kouamé	6	3	4	6^{9}
(Chile) A Tabilo	4	6	6	7^{11}

Fourth round
4	(Canada) F Auger-Aliassime	6	7	6
(Chile) A Tabilo	3	5	1

==== Section 4 ====
First round
10	(Italy) F Cobolli	6	7^{7}	6
Q	(Italy) A Pellegrino	4	6^{4}	3
(China) Y Wu	7	6	6
(United States) M Giron	5	2	4
Q	(Argentina) F Díaz Acosta	6	6	6
PR	(China) Z Zhang	1	4	3
(Chile) C Garín	0	6	0	2
18	(United States) L Tien	6	2	6	6
25	(Argentina) F Cerúndolo	6	6	6^{7}	6
(Netherlands) B van de Zandschulp	3	4	7^{9}	4
WC	(France) H Gaston	6	6	3	2	6
WC	(France) G Monfils	2	3	6	6	0
(Australia) A Popyrin	6	3	6^{3}	5
(United States) Z Svajda	3	6	7^{7}	7
WC	(Australia) A Walton	6	1	6	1	6
6	D Medvedev	2	6	1	6	4

Second round
10	(Italy) F Cobolli	6	6	6
(China) Y Wu	4	4	4
Q	(Argentina) F Díaz Acosta	5	6	6	6^{4}	3
18	(United States) L Tien	7	4	3	7^{7}	6
25	(Argentina) F Cerúndolo	2	6	6	6
WC	(France) H Gaston	6	4	2	1
(United States) Z Svajda	6	6	6^{4}	6
WC	(Australia) A Walton	3	4	7^{7}	2

Third round
10	(Italy) F Cobolli	6	6	6
18	(United States) L Tien	2	2	3
25	(Argentina) F Cerúndolo	3	4	6	6	3
(United States) Z Svajda	6	6	3	4	6

Fourth round
10	(Italy) F Cobolli	6	6	6^{3}	7^{7}
(United States) Z Svajda	2	3	7^{7}	6^{5}

=== Bottom half ===
==== Section 5 ====
First round
8	(Australia) A de Minaur	6	6	6
Q	(United Kingdom) T Samuel	4	4	2
(Belgium) A Blockx	6	6	6
LL	(Hong Kong) C Wong	3	4	2
(Argentina) M Navone	6	6	6
(United States) J Brooksby	4	4	4
WC	(France) T Droguet	3	2	4
26	(Czech Republic) J Menšík	6	6	6
23	(Argentina) TM Etcheverry	3	4	2
(Portugal) N Borges	6	6	6
(Serbia) M Kecmanović	7^{7}	6	6
(Hungary) F Marozsán	6^{0}	3	4
Q	(United States) E Nava	6^{10}	3	3
(Argentina) C Ugo Carabelli	7^{12}	6	6
(Peru) I Buse	3	7^{8}	3	5
11	A Rublev	6	6^{6}	6	7

Second round
8	(Australia) A de Minaur	w/o
(Belgium) A Blockx
(Argentina) M Navone	3	6	4	6	6^{11}
26	(Czech Republic) J Menšík	6	2	6	1	7^{13}
(Portugal) N Borges	3	6	6	6
(Serbia) M Kecmanović	6	2	1	2
(Argentina) C Ugo Carabelli	1	6	3	6^{5}
11	A Rublev	6	1	6	7^{7}

Third round
8	(Australia) A de Minaur	6	2	2	3
26	(Czech Republic) J Menšík	0	6	6	6
(Portugal) N Borges	5	6^{2}	6^{2}
11	A Rublev	7	7^{7}	7^{7}

Fourth round
26	(Czech Republic) J Menšík	6	7^{8}	4	2	6
11	A Rublev	3	6^{6}	6	6	3

==== Section 6 ====
First round
15	(Norway) C Ruud	6	7^{7}	5	0	6
Q	R Safiullin	2	6^{5}	7	6	2
(Serbia) H Medjedovic	6	6	6^{1}	6
(Germany) Y Hanfmann	3	4	7^{7}	4
(Italy) L Sonego	7^{7}	5	6	1	6
Q	(France) P-H Herbert	6^{3}	7	2	6	4
(Australia) R Hijikata	6	3	5	4
24	(United States) T Paul	4	6	7	6
28	(Brazil) J Fonseca	7^{8}	6	6
Q	(France) L Pavlovic	6^{6}	4	2
Q	(United States) M Zheng	1	1	3
(Croatia) D Prižmić	6	6	6
Q	(Bolivia) H Dellien	4	2	2
(France) V Royer	6	6	6
(France) G Mpetshi Perricard	7	5	1	4
3	(Serbia) N Djokovic	5	7	6	6

Second round
15	(Norway) C Ruud	6	6	6
(Serbia) H Medjedovic	3	2	4
(Italy) L Sonego	3	2	4
24	(United States) T Paul	6	6	6
28	(Brazil) J Fonseca	3	4	6	6	6
(Croatia) D Prižmić	6	6	3	1	2
(France) V Royer	3	2	7^{9}	3
3	(Serbia) N Djokovic	6	6	6^{7}	6

Third round
15	(Norway) C Ruud	4	6^{4}	6	7^{7}	7
24	(United States) T Paul	6	7^{7}	4	6^{4}	5
28	(Brazil) J Fonseca	4	4	6	7	7
3	(Serbia) N Djokovic	6	6	3	5	5

Fourth round
15	(Norway) C Ruud	5	6^{8}	7	2
28	(Brazil) J Fonseca	7	7^{10}	5	6

==== Section 7 ====
First round
7	(United States) T Fritz	6^{5}	6^{5}	7^{11}	1
WC	(United States) N Basavareddy	7^{7}	7^{7}	6^{9}	6
(Kazakhstan) A Shevchenko	2	4	2
(United States) A Michelsen	6	6	6
(Australia) J Duckworth	6	4
(Canada) G Diallo	3	1^{r}
(United States) A Kovacevic	1	0	4
27	(Spain) R Jódar	6	6	6
21	(Spain) A Davidovich Fokina	6^{3}	6	2	7	6
(Bosnia and Herzegovina) D Džumhur	7^{7}	3	6	5	3
Q	(Spain) P Llamas Ruiz	3	6^{6}	7^{7}	0
(Argentina) TA Tirante	6	7^{8}	6^{5}	6
PR	(Australia) T Kokkinakis	6^{5}	6	4	6	7
(France) T Atmane	7^{7}	2	6	3	5
(Spain) P Carreño Busta	6	7^{7}	6
12	(Czech Republic) J Lehečka	3	6^{3}	3

Second round
WC	(United States) N Basavareddy	6^{5}	3	6	3
(United States) A Michelsen	7^{7}	6	3	6
(Australia) J Duckworth	1	7^{7}	4	5
27	(Spain) R Jódar	6	6^{5}	6	7
21	(Spain) A Davidovich Fokina	6	6^{4}	1	3
(Argentina) TA Tirante	4	7^{7}	6	6
PR	(Australia) T Kokkinakis	5	6	0^{r}
(Spain) P Carreño Busta	7	4	1

Third round
(United States) A Michelsen	6^{2}	7^{7}	6	3	3
27	(Spain) R Jódar	7^{7}	6^{5}	4	6	6
(Argentina) TA Tirante	6^{0}	5	6	4
(Spain) P Carreño Busta	7^{7}	7	3	6

Fourth round
27	(Spain) R Jódar	4	4	6	6	6
(Spain) P Carreño Busta	6	6	1	2	2

==== Section 8 ====
First round
13	K Khachanov	6	7^{8}	6
WC	(France) A Géa	3	6^{6}	0
Q	(France) K Jacquet	4	2	2
(Argentina) M Trungelliti	6	6	6
Q	(Italy) F Cinà	3	6	6	6^{6}	6
(United States) R Opelka	6	4	2	7^{8}	4
(Switzerland) S Wawrinka	3	6	3	4
LL	(Netherlands) J de Jong	6	3	6	6
32	(France) U Humbert	6	6	6
(France) A Mannarino	3	4	3
(France) Q Halys	6	7^{7}	6
(Italy) M Bellucci	3	6^{4}	3
(Czech Republic) T Macháč	6	6	6
(Belgium) Z Bergs	4	4	3
(France) B Bonzi	3	4	2
2	(Germany) A Zverev	6	6	6

Second round
13	K Khachanov	7^{7}	5	6	7^{7}
(Argentina) M Trungelliti	6^{5}	7	1	6^{4}
Q	(Italy) F Cinà	3	1	3
LL	(Netherlands) J de Jong	6	6	6
32	(France) U Humbert	4	6^{4}	6^{8}
(France) Q Halys	6	7^{7}	7^{10}
(Czech Republic) T Macháč	4	2	2
2	(Germany) A Zverev	6	6	6

Third round
13	K Khachanov	5	7	2	7^{7}	2
LL	(Netherlands) J de Jong	7	5	6	6^{2}	6
(France) Q Halys	4	3	7	2
2	(Germany) A Zverev	6	6	5	6

Fourth round
LL	(Netherlands) J de Jong	6^{3}	4	1
2	(Germany) A Zverev	7^{7}	6	6

== Seeded players ==
The following are the seeded players. Seedings are based on ATP rankings as of 18 May 2026. Rankings and points before are as of 25 May 2026.

^{‡}	Champion
^{†}	Runner-up

Seed	Rank	Player	Points before	Points defending	Points won	Points after	Status
1	1	(Italy) Jannik Sinner	14,750	1,300	50	13,500	Second round lost to (Argentina) Juan Manuel Cerúndolo
2	3	(Germany) Alexander Zverev^{‡}	5,705	400	2,000	7,305	Champion, defeated (Italy) Flavio Cobolli [10]
3	4	(Serbia) Novak Djokovic	4,460	800	100	3,760	Third round lost to (Brazil) João Fonseca [28]
4	6	(Canada) Félix Auger-Aliassime	4,050	10	400	4,440	Quarterfinals lost to (Italy) Flavio Cobolli [10]
5	5	(United States) Ben Shelton	4,070	200	50	3,920	Second round lost to (Belgium) Raphaël Collignon
6	8	Daniil Medvedev	3,760	10	10	3,760	First round lost to (Australia) Adam Walton [WC]
7	9	(United States) Taylor Fritz	3,720	10	10	3,720	First round lost to (United States) Nishesh Basavareddy [WC]
8	7	(Australia) Alex de Minaur	3,855	50	100	3,905	Third round lost to (Czech Republic) Jakub Menšík [26]
9	10	(Kazakhstan) Alexander Bublik	3,320	400	10	2,930	First round lost to (Germany) Jan-Lennard Struff
10	14	(Italy) Flavio Cobolli^{†}	2,340	100	1,300	3,540	Runner-up, lost to (Germany) Alexander Zverev [2]
11	13	Andrey Rublev	2,460	200	200	2,460	Fourth round lost to (Czech Republic) Jakub Menšík [26]
12	12	(Czech Republic) Jiří Lehečka	2,665	100	10	2,575	First round lost to (Spain) Pablo Carreño Busta
13	15	Karen Khachanov	2,320	100	100	2,320	Third round lost to (Netherlands) Jesper de Jong [LL]
14	17	(Italy) Luciano Darderi	2,260	10	50	2,300	Second round lost to (Argentina) Francisco Comesaña
15	16	(Norway) Casper Ruud	2,275	50	200	2,425	Fourth round lost to (Brazil) João Fonseca [28]
16	19	(Monaco) Valentin Vacherot	2,103	8	50	2,145	Second round withdrew due to foot injury
~~17~~	~~20~~	~~(France) Arthur Fils~~	2,040	100	0	1,940	Withdrew due to hip injury
18	18	(United States) Learner Tien	2,180	10	100	2,270	Third round lost to (Italy) Flavio Cobolli [10]
19	22	(United States) Frances Tiafoe	1,905	400	200	1,705	Fourth round lost to (Italy) Matteo Arnaldi
20	24	(United Kingdom) Cameron Norrie	1,785	200	10	1,595	First round retired against (Paraguay) Adolfo Daniel Vallejo
21	23	(Spain) Alejandro Davidovich Fokina	1,860	50	50	1,860	Second round lost to (Argentina) Thiago Agustín Tirante
22	25	(France) Arthur Rinderknech	1,736	10	50	1,776	Second round lost to (Italy) Matteo Berrettini
23	28	(Argentina) Tomás Martín Etcheverry	1,510	10	10	1,510	First round lost to (Portugal) Nuno Borges
24	21	(United States) Tommy Paul	1,945	400	100	1,645	Third round lost to (Norway) Casper Ruud [15]
25	26	(Argentina) Francisco Cerúndolo	1,570	10	100	1,660	Third round lost to (United States) Zachary Svajda
26	27	(Czech Republic) Jakub Menšík	1,550	50	800	2,300	Semifinals lost to (Germany) Alexander Zverev [2]
27	29	(Spain) Rafael Jódar	1,461	(12)^{∆}	400	1,849	Quarterfinals lost to (Germany) Alexander Zverev [2]
28	30	(Brazil) João Fonseca	1,435	100	400	1,735	Quarterfinals lost to (Czech Republic) Jakub Menšík [26]
29	33	(Netherlands) Tallon Griekspoor	1,340	200	10	1,150	First round lost to (Italy) Matteo Arnaldi
30	34	(France) Corentin Moutet	1,323	50	10	1,283	First round lost to (Czech Republic) Vít Kopřiva
31	35	(United States) Brandon Nakashima	1,295	10	100	1,385	Third round lost to (Canada) Félix Auger-Aliassime [4]
32	32	(France) Ugo Humbert	1,370	50	50	1,370	Second round lost to (France) Quentin Halys

∆ The player didn't qualify for the tournament last year. He is defending points from his 18th best result instead.

=== Withdrawn seeded players ===
The following players would have been seeded, but withdrew before the tournament began.

Rank	Player	Points before	Points defending	Points after	Withdrawal reason
2	(Spain) Carlos Alcaraz	11,960	2,000	9,960	Right wrist injury
11	(Italy) Lorenzo Musetti	3,115	800	2,315	Left thigh injury

== Other entry information ==
=== Wildcards ===
- (United States) Nishesh Basavareddy
- (France) Titouan Droguet
- (France) Hugo Gaston
- (France) Arthur Géa
- (France) Moïse Kouamé
- (France) Gaël Monfils
- (France) Clément Tabur
- (Australia) Adam Walton

=== Protected ranking ===
- (China) Zhang Zhizhen (60)
- (Australia) Thanasi Kokkinakis (84)

=== Qualifiers ===
- (Italy) Federico Cinà
- (Bolivia) Hugo Dellien
- (Argentina) Facundo Díaz Acosta
- (Portugal) Jaime Faria
- (France) Thomas Faurel
- (France) Pierre-Hugues Herbert
- (France) Kyrian Jacquet
- (Spain) Pablo Llamas Ruiz
- (United States) Emilio Nava
- (France) Luka Pavlovic
- (Italy) Andrea Pellegrino
- (Bolivia) Juan Carlos Prado Ángelo
- (Austria) Jurij Rodionov
- Roman Safiullin
- (United Kingdom) Toby Samuel
- (United States) Michael Zheng

=== Lucky losers ===
- (Netherlands) Jesper de Jong
- (Lithuania) Vilius Gaubas
- (Hong Kong) Coleman Wong

=== Withdrawals ===
- † (France) Arthur Cazaux (71) → replaced by (Australia) Rinky Hijikata (103)
- ‡ (Spain) Carlos Alcaraz (2) → replaced by (Spain) Daniel Mérida (104)
- ‡ (United Kingdom) Jack Draper (28) → replaced by (Italy) Matteo Arnaldi (105)
- ‡ (Denmark) Holger Rune (27) → replaced by (France) Benjamin Bonzi (106)
- ‡ (Italy) Lorenzo Musetti (9) → replaced by (Switzerland) Stan Wawrinka (107)
- ‡ (United States) Sebastian Korda (43) → replaced by (Hong Kong) Coleman Wong (LL)
- § (France) Arthur Fils (30) → replaced by (Netherlands) Jesper de Jong (LL)
- § (United States) Patrick Kypson (93) → replaced by (Lithuania) Vilius Gaubas (LL)

† – not on the entry list
‡ – withdrew from entry list
§ – withdrew from main draw

Preceded by 2026 Australian Open – Men's singles	Grand Slam men's singles	Succeeded by 2026 Wimbledon Championships – Men's singles
