= Hsu Yu-hsiou =

Taiwanese tennis player (born 1999)

Hsu Yu-hsiou 許育修
- Hsu at the 2026 Wimbledon Championships
- Country (sports): Chinese Taipei
- Residence: Changhua, Taiwan
- Born: 2 April 1999 (age 27) Changhua, Taiwan
- Height: 1.78 m (5 ft 10 in)
- Turned pro: 2016
- Plays: Right-handed (two-handed backhand)
- Coach: Hsiao-Yung Chang
- Prize money: US $967,948

Singles
- Career record: 6–5
- Career titles: 0
- Highest ranking: No. 158 (16 October 2023)
- Current ranking: No. 269 (16 November 2026)

Grand Slam singles results
- Australian Open: 1R (2023)
- French Open: Q1 (2023, 2026)
- Wimbledon: Q1 (2023, 2024, 2026)
- US Open: 2R (2023)

Doubles
- Career record: 5–2
- Career titles: 0
- Highest ranking: No. 145 (17 November 2025)
- Current ranking: No. 284 (16 November 2026)
Medal record
Men's tennis
Representing Chinese Taipei
Asian Games
Gold medal – first place	2022 Hangzhou	Doubles
Bronze medal – third place	2022 Hangzhou	Mixed doubles
World University Games
Gold medal – first place	2021 Chengdu	Doubles
Gold medal – first place	2021 Chengdu	Mixed
Gold medal – first place	2021 Chengdu	Team
- Last updated on: 16 November 2026.

Hsu Yu-hsiou
- Traditional Chinese: 許育修
- Simplified Chinese: 许育修
Transcriptions
Standard Mandarin
- Hanyu Pinyin: Xǔ Yùxiū

Hsu Yu-hsiou (Chinese: 許育修; born 2 April 1999) is a Taiwanese tennis player. He has a career high ATP singles ranking of world No. 158 achieved on 16 October 2023 and a career high ATP doubles ranking of world No. 145 achieved on 17 November 2025. Hsu is currently the No. 1 Taiwanese tennis player.

== Junior career ==
As a junior, Hsu achieved a career-high total combined ranking of No. 5, reached on 12 June 2017. In 2017, he won the 2017 Australian Open boys' doubles championships title alongside Zhao Lingxi. He then won the 2017 Wimbledon boys' doubles championships title with Axel Geller and impressively also the 2017 US Open boys' doubles championships title with Wu Yibing, holding three out of the four junior grand slam doubles championships simultaneously.

== Professional career ==
=== 2018: First ITF titles and ATP Challenger final ===
In March 2018, he won his first singles and doubles titles on the ITF Men's Circuit. In the same year, he made his debut for the Chinese Taipei Davis Cup team, where he won his single's tie against Shahin Khaledan of Iran by a score of 4–6, 6–1, [10–8]. This would mark his first appearance as well as his first win at the ATP Tour level.

In September, Hsu reached his first career final on the ATP Challenger Tour where he and partner Jimmy Wang lost in the doubles final of the 2018 Kaohsiung Challenger to Yang Tsung-hua and Hsieh Cheng-peng 7–6^{(7–3)}, 2–6, [8–10], in an all-Taiwanese final.

=== 2023: Major and Masters debuts and first wins, top 175 ===
Hsu made his Grand Slam debut by qualifying for the 2023 Australian Open, beating Evan Furness, Elias Ymer and Alexandre Muller.

He also qualified for the US Open and won his first round match against Thanasi Kokkinakis, making him the fifth Taiwanese men's singles player to ever qualify for the tournament, and the third Taiwanese man to win a Major match in history.

He made his debut in qualifying at a Masters 1000 level at the 2023 Rolex Shanghai Masters. He qualified for the main draw and recorded his first Masters 1000 wins defeating Max Purcell and 17th seed Lorenzo Musetti. He lost to 16th seed and eventual champion Hubert Hurkacz. He reached a career high ranking of No. 158 on 16 October 2023.

=== 2025: Two Challenger doubles titles, top 150 ===
Hsu Yu-hsiou won two ATP Challenger doubles titles at the 2025 Open Sopra Steria de Lyon with Kaichi Uchida and at the 2025 Cranbrook Tennis Classic with Huang Tsung-hao.

== Performance timeline ==
Key
W	F	SF	QF	#R	RR	Q#	DNQ	A	NH

(W) winner; (F) finalist; (SF) semifinalist; (QF) quarterfinalist; (#R) rounds 4, 3, 2, 1; (RR) round-robin stage; (Q#) qualification round; (DNQ) did not qualify; (A) absent; (NH) not held; (SR) strike rate (events won / competed); (W–L) win–loss record.
To avoid confusion and double counting, these charts are updated at the conclusion of a tournament or when the player's participation has ended.

=== Singles ===
Tournament	2023	2024	2025	2026	SR	W–L	Win %
Grand Slam tournaments
Australian Open	1R	Q1	A	Q1	0 / 1	0–1	0%
French Open	Q1	A	A	Q1	0 / 0	0–0	–
Wimbledon	Q1	Q1	A	Q1	0 / 0	0–0	–
US Open	2R	Q3	Q1		0 / 1	1–1	50%
Win–loss	1–2	0–0	0–0	0–0	0 / 2	1–2	33%
ATP Masters 1000
Indian Wells Masters	A	A	A		0 / 0	0–0	–
Miami Open	A	A	A		0 / 0	0–0	–
Monte Carlo Masters	A	A	A		0 / 0	0–0	–
Madrid Open	A	A	A		0 / 0	0-0	–
Italian Open	A	A	A		0 / 0	0–0	–
Canadian Open	A	A	A		0 / 0	0–0	–
Cincinnati Masters	A	A	A		0 / 0	0–0	–
Shanghai Masters	3R	Q1	A		0 / 1	2–1	67%
Paris Masters	A	A	A		0 / 0	0–0	–
Win–loss	2–1	0–0	0–0	0–0	0 / 1	2–1	67%

== ATP Challengers and ITF finals ==
=== Singles: 26 (16–10) ===
Legend (singles) ATP Challenger Tour (1–3) ITF Futures/World Tennis Tour (15–7)	Titles by surface Hard (16–10) Clay (0–0)

Result	W–L	Date	Tournament	Tier	Surface	Opponent	Score
Win	1–0	Jul 2018	Chinese Taipei F3, Taipei	Futures	Hard	(United States) Michael Zhu	6–2, 6–3
Loss	1–1	Jul 2019	M25, Taipei, Chinese Taipei	World Tennis Tour	Hard	(China) Bai Yan	4–6, 4–6
Win	2–1	Sep 2019	M15, Hua Hin, Thailand	World Tennis Tour	Hard	(United Kingdom) Ryan Peniston	6–3, 6–3
Loss	2–2	Jan 2020	M15, Hong Kong	World Tennis Tour	Hard	(Japan) Yuta Shimizu	7–5, 6–7^{(7–9)}, 6–7^{(5–7)}
Win	3–2	Feb 2021	M15, Sharm El Sheikh, Egypt	World Tennis Tour	Hard	(Belgium) Arnaud Bovy	6–4, 6–4
Win	4–2	Mar 2021	M15, Sharm El Sheikh, Egypt	World Tennis Tour	Hard	(Italy) Edoardo Eremin	6–3, 6–2
Win	5–2	Mar 2021	M15, Sharm El Sheikh, Egypt	World Tennis Tour	Hard	(Austria) Lukas Krainer	6–2, 6–1
Win	6–2	Mar 2021	M15, Sharm El Sheikh, Egypt	World Tennis Tour	Hard	(Japan) Makoto Ochi	6–2, 6–1
Loss	6–3	Jul 2021	M25, Nur-Sultan, Kazakhstan	World Tennis Tour	Hard	(Russia) Evgeny Karlovskiy	6–7^{(4–7)}, 6–2, 3–6
Win	7–3	Feb 2022	M25, Sharm El Sheikh, Egypt	World Tennis Tour	Hard	(Czech Republic) Marek Gengel	6–3, 6–2
Loss	7–4	Mar 2022	M25, Quinta do Lago, Portugal	World Tennis Tour	Hard	(Monaco) Valentin Vacherot	4–6, 3–6
Win	8–4	Jun 2022	M25, Dallas, USA	World Tennis Tour	Hard	(Romania) Gabi Adrian Boitan	7–5, 6–3
Win	9–4	Sep 2022	M25, Tây Ninh, Vietnam	World Tennis Tour	Hard	(Vietnam) Lý Hoàng Nam	6–3, 6–2
Win	10–4	Oct 2022	Sydney, Australia	Challenger	Hard	(Australia) Marc Polmans	6–4, 7–6^{(7–5)}
Win	11–4	Apr 2023	M25, Tsukuba, Japan	World Tennis Tour	Hard	(Japan) Sho Shimabukuro	7–6^{(7–5)}, 6–4
Win	12–4	Apr 2023	M25, Kashiwa, Japan	World Tennis Tour	Hard	(South Korea) Lee Jea-moon	6–1, 6–1
Win	13–4	Apr 2024	M15, Kashiwa, Japan	World Tennis Tour	Hard	(Japan) Masamichi Imamura	3–6, 7–5, 6–4
Loss	13–5	Jul 2024	M25, Tianjin, China	World Tennis Tour	Hard	(China) Bai Yan	2–6, 4–6
Loss	13–6	Aug 2024	M25, Taipei, Chinese Taipei	World Tennis Tour	Hard	(Japan) Keisuke Saitoh	3–6, 1–6
Win	14–6	Aug 2024	M25, Taipei, Chinese Taipei	World Tennis Tour	Hard	(Australia) Blake Ellis	6–3, 6–4
Loss	14–7	Sep 2024	Shanghai, China	Challenger	Hard	(Japan) Sho Shimabukuro	4–6, 4–6
Loss	14–8	Feb 2025	M25, Timaru, New Zealand	World Tennis Tour	Hard	(United States) Christian Langmo	6–7^{(6–8)}, 3–6
Loss	14–9	Aug 2025	Chicago, US	Challenger	Hard	(United States) Michael Zheng	4–6, 2–6
Win	15–9	Mar 2026	M25, Launceston, Australia	Challenger	Hard	(Japan) Hiroki Moriya	6–2, 6–3
Win	16–9	Oct 2026	M25, Taipei, Chinese Taipei	Challenger	Hard	(Australia) Matthew Dellavedova	6–3, 6–2
Loss	16–10	Nov 2026	Matsuyama, Japan	Challenger	Hard	(United Kingdom) Billy Harris	6–3, 1–6, 6–7^{(6–8)}

=== Doubles: 47 (31–16) ===
Legend (doubles) ATP Challenger Tour (7–5) ITF Futures/World Tennis Tour (24–11)	Titles by surface Hard (26–15) Clay (5–1)

Result	W–L	Date	Tournament	Tier	Surface	Partner	Opponents	Score
Win	1–0	Mar 2018	Australia F3, Mornington	Futures	Clay	(Australia) Matthew Romios	(Australia) Tom Evans (Australia) Max Purcell	6–3, 6–3
Loss	1–1	Jun 2018	Singapore F3, Singapore	Futures	Hard	(Japan) Yuta Shimizu	(Australia) Jeremy Beale (Australia) James Frawley	2–6, 3–6
Win	2–1	Jul 2018	Taipei F2, Chinese Taipei	Futures	Hard	(United States) Nicholas S. Hu	(Hong Kong) Pak Long Yeung (Hong Kong) Chun HunWong	7–5, 7–6^{(7–5)}
Loss	2–2	Sep 2018	Kaohsiung, Taiwan	Challenger	Hard	(Chinese Taipei) Jimmy Wang	(Chinese Taipei) Hsieh Cheng-peng (Chinese Taipei) Yang Tsung-hua	7–6^{(7–3)}, 2–6, [8–10]
Win	3–2	Nov 2018	Thailand F8, Nonthaburi	Futures	Hard	(Chinese Taipei) Hsieh Cheng-peng	(Philippines) Francis Casey Alcantara (Portugal) Bernardo Saraiva	6–1, 6–0
Win	4–2	Dec 2018	Hong Kong F3	Futures	Hard	(Japan) Shintaro Imai	(Chile) Xin Gao (Chile) Aoran Wang	7–6^{(7–1)}, 6–1
Loss	4–3	Jan 2019	M25 Hong Kong	World Tennis Tour	Hard	(Japan) Shintaro Imai	(Thailand) Sanchai Ratiwatana (Thailand) Sonchat Ratiwatana	4–6, 6–7^{[4–7)}
Win	5–3	Jan 2019	M15 Sharm El Sheikh, Egypt	World Tennis Tour	Hard	(Japan) Shintaro Imai	(Czech Republic) David Poljak (Poland) Kacper Zuk	6–2, 6–0
Win	6–3	Mar 2019	M15 Tsukuba, Japan	World Tennis Tour	Hard	(Japan) Shintaro Imai	(Australia) Blake Ellis (Australia) Michael Look	1–6, 6–1, [10–7]
Win	7–3	Aug 2019	M25 Nonthaburi, Thailand	World Tennis Tour	Hard	(Japan) Yuta Shimizu	(Uzbekistan) Sanjar Fayziev (Uzbekistan) Sergey Fomin	6–2, 6–3
Loss	7–4	Sep 2019	M15 Hua Hin, Thailand	World Tennis Tour	Hard	(Chinese Taipei) Wei-De Lin	(South Korea) Seong Chan Hong (South Korea) Sanhul Shin	4–6, 4–6
Loss	7–5	Oct 2019	M25 Toowoomba, Australia	World Tennis Tour	Hard	(Ukraine) Vladyslav Orlov	(United Kingdom) Brydan Klein (Australia) Scott Puodziunas	3–6, 4–6
Win	8–5	Jan 2020	M15 Hong Kong	World Tennis Tour	Hard	(Switzerland) Luca Castelnuovo	(Chinese Taipei) Wei-De Lin (Thailand) Wishaya Trongcharoenchaikul	5–7, 6–3, [11–9]
Loss	8–6	Feb 2021	M15 Sharm El Sheikh, Egypt	World Tennis Tour	Hard	(Japan) Jumpei Yamasaki	(Japan) Shintaro Imai (Japan) Kaito Uesugi	6–7^{(5–7)}, 4–6
Win	9–6	Feb 2021	M15 Sharm El Sheikh, Egypt	World Tennis Tour	Hard	(Japan) Jumpei Yamasaki	(Latvia) Martins Podzus (Germany) Robert Strombachs	6–3, 5–7, [10–7]
Win	10–6	Feb 2021	M15 Sharm El Sheikh, Egypt	World Tennis Tour	Hard	(Japan) Shintaro Imai	(Japan) Yusuke Takahash (Japan) Jumpei Yamasaki	7–5, 6–4
Loss	10–7	Mar 2021	M15 Sharm El Sheikh, Egypt	World Tennis Tour	Hard	(Japan) Shintaro Imai	(Italy) Jacopo Berrettini (Italy) Luca Nardi	3–6, 6–2, [7–10]
Win	11–7	Jun 2021	M15 Antalya, Turkey	World Tennis Tour	Clay	(Chile) Miguel Fernando Pereira	(Romania) Cezar Crețu (Romania) Alexandru Jecan	7–6^{(11−9)}, 2–6, [11–9]
Loss	11–8	Jun 2021	M15 Antalya, Turkey	World Tennis Tour	Clay	(Chinese Taipei) Lee Kuan-Yi	(Argentina) Francisco Comesaña (Argentina) Mariano Kestelboim	7–5, 4–6, [4–10]
Win	12−8	Jul 2021	Nur-Sultan, Kazakhstan	Challenger	Hard	(Zimbabwe) Benjamin Lock	(Canada) Peter Polansky (Ukraine) Sergiy Stakhovsky	2–6, 6–1, [10–7]
Win	13−8	Jul 2021	Nur-Sultan, Kazakhstan	Challenger	Hard	(Zimbabwe) Benjamin Lock	(Ukraine) Oleksii Krutykh (Kazakhstan) Grigoriy Lomakin	6–3, 6–4
Loss	13–9	Aug 2021	M15 Decatur, United States	World Tennis Tour	Hard	(Japan) Shintaro Imai	(Netherlands) Gijs Brouwer (United States) Reese Stalder	3–6, 5–7
Loss	13−10	Dec 2021	Antalya, Turkey	Challenger	Clay	(Chinese Taipei) Tseng Chun-hsin	(Italy) Riccardo Bonadio (Italy) Giovanni Fonio	6–3, 2–6, [10–12]
Win	14−10	Dec 2021	Antalya, Turkey	Challenger	Clay	(Ukraine) Oleksii Krutykh	(Uzbekistan) Sanjar Fayziev (Greece) Markos Kalovelonis	6–1, 7–6^{(7–5)}
Win	15–10	Dec 2021	M15 Doha, Qatar	World Tennis Tour	Hard	(Ukraine) Marat Deviatiarov	(Chinese Taipei) Huang Tsung-hao (Georgia (country)) Saba Purtseladze	6–1, 6–0
Win	16–10	Jan 2022	M15 Cairo, Egypt	World Tennis Tour	Clay	(Chinese Taipei) Huang Tsung-hao	(Italy) Riccardo Bonadio (Austria) David Pichler	6–4, 7–6^{(8−6)}
Win	17–10	Jan 2022	M25 Cairo, Egypt	World Tennis Tour	Clay	(Austria) Neil Oberleitner	(Greece) Markos Kalovelonis (Austria) David Pichler	7–6^{(7−5)}, 6−4
Loss	17–11	Feb 2022	M25 Sharm El Sheikh, Egypt	World Tennis Tour	Hard	(Austria) Neil Oberleitner	(Russia) Alibek Kachmazov (Kazakhstan) Beibit Zhukayev	6−1, 6–7^{(1−7)}, [5−10]
Loss	17–12	Feb 2022	M25 Santo Domingo, Dominican Republic	World Tennis Tour	Hard	(Chinese Taipei) Wu Tung-lin	(Australia) Rinky Hijikata (United Kingdom) Henry Patten	6−2, 6–7^{(4−7)}, [3−10]
Win	18–12	Mar 2022	M25 Portimao, Portugal	World Tennis Tour	Hard	(Austria) Neil Oberleitner	(Austria) Maximilian Neuchrist (Germany) Kai Wehnelt	6−3, 3–6, [10−7]
Win	19–12	Mar 2022	M25 Loule, Portugal	World Tennis Tour	Hard	(Austria) Neil Oberleitner	(Portugal) Pedro Araujo (Netherlands) Guy den Ouden	7−5, 7–5
Win	20–12	Mar 2022	M25 Quinta do Lago, Portugal	World Tennis Tour	Hard	(Austria) Neil Oberleitner	(Portugal) Fábio Coelho (Portugal) Gonçalo Falcão	7−5, 4–6, [10−8]
Win	21–12	May 2022	M25 Monastir, Tunisia	World Tennis Tour	Hard	(China) Sun Fajing	(Australia) Jayden Court (Australia) Dane Sweeny	7−6^{(7−4)}, 6–3
Win	22–12	May 2022	M25 Monastir, Tunisia	World Tennis Tour	Hard	(China) Sun Fajing	(Australia) Blake Bayldon (Australia) Jordan Smith	6−4, 7−6^{(7−2)}
Loss	22–13	Jun 2022	M25 Chiang Rai, Thailand	World Tennis Tour	Hard	(China) Sun Fajing	(Thailand) Congsup Congcar (Japan) Shintaro Imai	4−6, 6−1, [8−10]
Win	23–13	Jun 2022	M25 Wichita, United States	World Tennis Tour	Hard	(Japan) Yuta Shimizu	(Ghana) Abraham Asaba (United States) Sekou Bangoura	6−4, 2−6, [10−5]
Win	24−13	Nov 2022	Yokkaichi, Japan	Challenger	Hard	(Japan) Yuta Shimizu	(Japan) Masamichi Imamura (Japan) Rio Noguchi	7–6^{(7–2)}, 6–4
Win	25−13	Feb 2023	Bangalore, India	Challenger	Hard	(South Korea) Chung Yun-seong	(India) Anirudh Chandrasekar (India) Vijay Sundar Prashanth	3–6, 7–6^{(9–7)}, [11–9]
Win	26–13	Apr 2023	M25 Tsukuba, Japan	World Tennis Tour	Hard	(Chinese Taipei) Huang Tsung-hao	(Japan) Shinji Hazawa (Japan) Hikaru Shiraishi	7–6^{(8–6)}, 3−6, [10−5]
Win	27–13	Apr 2023	M25 Kashiwa, Japan	World Tennis Tour	Hard	(Chinese Taipei) Huang Tsung-hao	(Japan) Shintaro Imai (South Korea) Chung Yun-seong	7–6^{(7–5)}, 2−6, [12−10]
Win	28–13	Jul 2024	M25 Tianjin, China	World Tennis Tour	Hard	(Japan) Ryotaro Taguchi	(China) Sun Fajing (South Korea) Chung Yun-seong	–^{(–)},−, [−]
Win	29–13	Mar 2025	M25 Launceston, Australia	World Tennis Tour	Hard	(Chinese Taipei) Huang Tsung-hao	(Australia) Kody Pearson (United States) Joshua Sheehy	–,−
Win	30−13	Jun 2025	Lyon, France	Challenger	Clay	(Japan) Kaichi Uchida	(France) Luca Sanchez (Japan) Seita Watanabe	1–6, 6–3, [12–10]
Win	31−13	Jul 2025	Bloomfield Hills, MI USA	Challenger	Hard	(Chinese Taipei) Huang Tsung-hao	(United States) Theodore Winegar (United States) Michael Zheng	4–6, 6–3, [11–9]
Loss	31−14	Aug 2025	Lexington, KY USA	Challenger	Hard	(Chinese Taipei) Huang Tsung-hao	(India) Anirudh Chandrasekar (India) Ramkumar Ramanathan	4–6, 4–6
Loss	31−15	Apr 2026	Jiujiang, China	Challenger	Hard	(Japan) Seita Watanabe	(South Korea) Nam Ji-sung (Finland) Patrik Niklas-Salminen	4–6, 4–6
Loss	31−16	Oct 2026	Guangzhou, China	Challenger	Hard	(China) Sun Fajing	(Netherlands) Thijmen Loof (Japan) Kaito Uesugi	2–6, 2–6

== Junior Grand Slam finals ==
=== Doubles: 3 (3 titles) ===
Result	Year	Tournament	Surface	Partner	Opponent	Score
Winner	2017	Australian Open	Hard	(China) Zhao Lingxi	(New Zealand) Finn Reynolds (Portugal) Duarte Vale	6–7^{(8–10)}, 6–4, [10–5]
Winner	2017	Wimbledon Championships	Grass	(Argentina) Axel Geller	(Austria) Jurij Rodionov (Czech Republic) Michael Vrbenský	6–4, 6–4
Winner	2017	US Open	Hard	(China) Wu Yibing	(Japan) Toru Horie (Japan) Yuta Shimizu	6–4, 5–7, [11–9]
