= Theodore Winegar =

American tennis player

- Country (sports): United States
- Born: July 10, 2001 (age 25) Sarasota, Florida, US
- Height: 6 ft 3 in (1.91 m)
- Plays: Right-handed
- College: Columbia; Duke
- Prize money: US $166,127

Singles
- Career record: 0–0 (at ATP Tour level, Grand Slam level, and in Davis Cup)
- Career titles: 0
- Highest ranking: No. 1,437 (April 20, 2026)
- Current ranking: No. 1,525 (November 9, 2026)

Doubles
- Career record: 10–10 (at ATP Tour level, Grand Slam level, and in Davis Cup)
- Career titles: 1 ITF
- Highest ranking: No. 58 (November 9, 2026)
- Current ranking: No. 58 (November 9, 2026)

Grand Slam doubles results
- Wimbledon: 3R (2026)
- US Open: 2R (2025, 2026)
- Last updated on: November 9, 2026.

Theodore Winegar (born July 10, 2001) is an American tennis player specializing in doubles. He has a career-high ATP doubles ranking of world No. 58 achieved on November 9, 2026, and a singles ranking of No. 1,437 achieved on April 20, 2026..

== Early life and college career ==
Winegar was born in Sarasota, Florida and attended Pine View School. At 15, he won the Boys’ 16s doubles title at the USTA International Spring Championships in Carson, California. He played NCAA DI doubles at Columbia where he was a four-time D1 Scholar-Athlete for the Columbia Lions. At Columbia, he was twice named First Team All-Ivy and an NCAA All American partnering with Michael Zheng and Max Westphal. He reached the Elite 8 at the ITA Fall Nationals with Westphal in his sophomore year and was ranked in the ITA National Top 10 twice. Winegar finished his senior season ranked No. 1 in the ITA Northeast Region and No. 24 in the ITA doubles with Zheng. He graduated with a bachelors degree in psychology.

Because the Ivy League does not permit its student-athletes to compete as graduate students—requiring them to exhaust their eligibility within their four undergraduate years—Winegar was unable to use his additional year of COVID-19 eligibility at Columbia. Athletes at Ivy League schools who wish to exercise remaining eligibility must therefore transfer to a school outside the conference, and after completing his four years at Columbia, Winegar did so in order to take advantage of his added year. He played a post-graduate year for the Duke Blue Devils, where he and partner Cooper Williams finished as Top Ten ITA All-Americans. They won the inaugural American Collegiate Wildcard Playoff in Orlando, FL to earn a spot in the main doubles draw of the 2025 US Open.

== Professional career ==
In October 2023, Winegar won his first professional tournament at the ITF M25 in Saint-Augustin, Quebec and began his post-college career with ITF title wins at the M25 Marburg Open in Marburg, Germany and the M25 Wilhelmshohe Open in Kassel, Germany with Westphal.

Winegar made his ATP main draw debut in doubles at the 2025 Los Cabos Open, partnering with James Cerretani.

In July 2025, Winegar reached his first Challenger doubles final at the 2025 Cranbrook Tennis Classic with Michael Zheng. In August, Winegar made his Grand Slam debut at the 2025 US Open, having received the US collegiate wildcard into the doubles main draw with Cooper Williams. Winegar and Williams defeated Petr Nouza and Patrik Rikl in the first round, before falling to Tim Putz and Kevin Krawietz in the second.
