= Cranbrook Tennis Classic =

- 2026 Cranbrook Tennis Classic

ATP Challenger Tour
- Event name: Cranbrook Tennis Classic
- Location: Bloomfield Hills, Michigan, United States
- Category: ATP Challenger 125 (2026-)
- Surface: Hard
- Prize money: $230,000 (2026)
- Website: website

The Cranbrook Tennis Classic is a professional tennis tournament played on hardcourts. It is currently part of the ATP Challenger Tour 125. It was first held in Bloomfield Hills, Michigan, United States in 2023. In 2025 it was upgraded to a Challenger 100 from previously being a Challenger 75, and in 2026 to a Challenger 125. In 2025 the event was voted “ATP Challenger 100 tournament of the year”.

== Past finals ==
=== Singles ===
Year	Champion	Runner-up	Score
2026	(United States) Alex Michelsen	(United Kingdom) Jacob Fearnley	7–6^{(7–4)}, 6–3
2025	(Estonia) Mark Lajal	(United States) Andres Martin	6–7^{(7–9)}, 7–5, 7–6^{(11–9)}
2024	(United States) Learner Tien	(United States) Nishesh Basavareddy	4–6, 6–3, 6–4
2023	(United States) Steve Johnson	(Kazakhstan) Mikhail Kukushkin	6–4, 6–7^{(7–9)}, 7–6^{(7–4)}

=== Doubles ===
Year	Champions	Runners-up	Score
2026	(United States) Trey Hilderbrand (United States) JJ Tracy	(Thailand) Pruchya Isaro (India) Niki Kaliyanda Poonacha	6–3, 7–6^{(7–2)}
2025	(Chinese Taipei) Hsu Yu-hsiou (Chinese Taipei) Huang Tsung-hao	(United States) Theodore Winegar (United States) Michael Zheng	4–6, 6–3, [11–9]
2024	(United States) Ryan Seggerman (United States) Patrik Trhac	(United States) Ozan Baris (United States) Nishesh Basavareddy	4–6, 6–3, [10–6]
2023	(Australia) Tristan Schoolkate (Australia) Adam Walton	(Australia) Blake Ellis (Australia) Calum Puttergill	7–5, 6–3
