= Mark Lajal =

Estonian tennis player (born 2003)

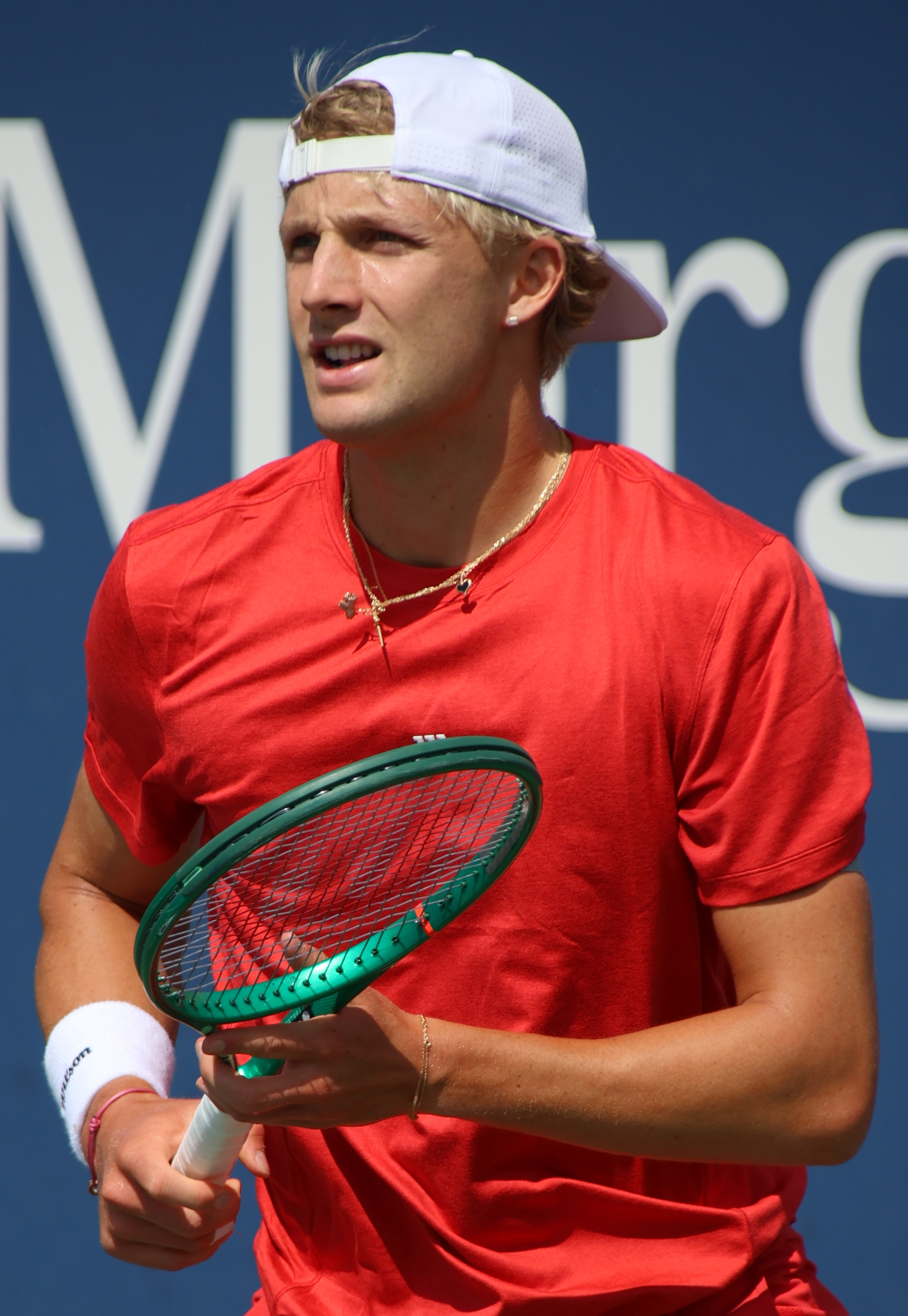
- Lajal at the 2026 US Open
- Country (sports): Estonia
- Born: 12 May 2003 (age 23) Tallinn, Estonia
- Height: 1.91 m (6 ft 3 in)
- Plays: Right-handed (two-handed backhand)
- Coach: Karl Kiur Saar (2024–present); Davide Sanguinetti (Dec 2025–present); Wayne Black (2024–2025)
- Prize money: US $743,515

Singles
- Career record: 6–9
- Career titles: 2 Challenger
- Highest ranking: No. 140 (14 September 2026)
- Current ranking: No. 140 (14 September 2026)

Grand Slam singles results
- Australian Open: Q3 (2025)
- French Open: Q1 (2024, 2025, 2026)
- Wimbledon: 1R (2024)
- US Open: Q1 (2023, 2025, 2026)

Doubles
- Career record: 1–1
- Career titles: 0
- Highest ranking: No. 703 (25 November 2024)

Team competitions
- Davis Cup: 4–4
- Last updated on: 14 September 2026.

Mark Lajal (born 12 May 2003) is an Estonian tennis player. He has a career high ATP singles ranking of world No. 140, achieved on 14 September 2026. He also has a career high ATP doubles ranking of No. 703, achieved on 25 November 2024. He is currently the No. 1 Estonian player. He has won two ATP Challenger singles titles.

Lajal represents Estonia at the Davis Cup, where he has a W/L record of 4–4.

== Career ==
=== 2021–2022: Juniors, ITF titles ===
On the junior tour, he had a career high ITF combined ranking of No. 13, achieved on 30 August 2021.

=== 2023: Challenger title, ATP debut & first win, top 200 ===
He won his first Challenger title in Little Rock, Arkansas. He became the first Estonian to win a Challenger title before his 21st birthday and Estonia's second ever Challenger champion.

Ranked No. 229 on his ATP debut, he received a wildcard for the main draw of the 2023 European Open and defeated Jaume Munar for his first ATP win. He then lost to fourth seed and eventual finalist Arthur Fils in the second round.

As a lucky loser at the Bergamo Challenger, Lajal beat Jelle Sels, Ugo Blanchet and the opponent he lost to in qualifying, Pierre-Hugues Herbert to reach the semifinals, where he lost to David Goffin in 3 sets. As a result, he made his debut in the top 200.

=== 2024: Grand Slam debut ===
In July, ranked No. 262, Lajal made his Grand Slam debut at Wimbledon after a successful qualifying campaign in which he ousted 25th qualifying seed Francesco Passaro, Henrique Rocha and fourth seed James Duckworth. He became the first Estonian man to reach a Grand Slam main draw since Jürgen Zopp at the 2018 Roland Garros. He lost in straight sets to eventual champion Carlos Alcaraz on his debut.

In August, Lajal reached his second career Challenger final in Zhangjiagang, losing to Yasutaka Uchiyama in the final.

=== 2025–2026: ATP quarterfinal, Masters and top 150 debuts ===
In June 2025, Lajal entered the main draw at the 2025 Libéma Open as a qualifier. He reached the second round by defeating world No. 64 Laslo Djere, for his biggest win, the first on grass and only his second ATP win. He reached his first ATP Tour quarterfinal by getting a walkover from fifth seed Hubert Hurkacz. He lost to Zizou Bergs in the quarterfinals.

In July, Lajal won his second Challenger at the 2025 Cranbrook Tennis Classic, defeating Andres Martin in the final. As a result, he entered the top 150 on 28 July 2025.

== Performance timeline ==
=== Singles ===
Tournament	2023	2024	2025	2026	SR	W–L	Win%
Grand Slam tournaments
Australian Open	A	Q1	Q3	Q1	0 / 0	0–0	–
French Open	A	Q1	Q1	Q1	0 / 0	0–0	–
Wimbledon	A	1R	Q2	Q1	0 / 1	0–1	0%
US Open	Q1	A	Q1	Q1	0 / 0	0–0	–
Win–loss	0–0	0–1	0–0	0–0	0 / 1	0–1	0%
ATP Masters 1000
Indian Wells	A	A	A	A	0 / 0	0–0	–
Miami Open	A	A	A	A	0 / 0	0–0	–
Monte-Carlo Masters	A	A	A	A	0 / 0	0–0	–
Madrid Open	A	A	A	A	0 / 0	0–0	–
Italian Open	A	A	A	A	0 / 0	0–0	–
Canadian Open	A	A	A	A	0 / 0	0–0	–
Cincinnati Masters	A	A	Q1	1R	0 / 1	0–1	0%
Shanghai Masters	A	A	A		0 / 0	0–0	–
Paris Masters	A	A	A		0 / 0	0–0	–
Win–loss	0–0	0–0	0–0	0–1	0 / 1	0–1	0%
Career statistics
	2023	2024	2025	2026	Total		
Tournaments	1	1	1		3		
Titles	0	0	0		0		
Finals	0	0	0		0		
Overall win–loss	2–3 (Note: including 2022 activity)	1–2	3–3		6–8		
Year-end ranking	206	229	146		43%		

== ATP Challenger Tour finals ==
=== Singles: 6 (2 titles, 4 runner-ups) ===
Legend ATP Challenger Tour (2–4)	Titles by surface Hard (2–4)

Result	W–L	Date	Tournament	Tier	Surface	Opponent	Score
Win	1–0	Jun 2023	Little Rock, USA	Challenger	Hard	(Kazakhstan) Beibit Zhukayev	6–4, 7–5
Loss	1–1	Aug 2024	Zhangjiagang, China	Challenger	Hard	(Japan) Yasutaka Uchiyama	7–6^{(7–4)}, 2–6, 2–6
Win	2–1	Jul 2025	Bloomfield Hills, USA	Challenger	Hard	(United States) Andres Martin	6–7^{(7–9)}, 7–5, 7–6^{(11–9)}
Loss	2–2	Jul 2026	Lincoln, USA	Challenger	Hard	(Australia) Bernard Tomic	6–4, 6–7^{(4–7)}, 6–7^{(3–7)}
Loss	2–3	Aug 2026	Vancouver, Canada	Challenger	Hard	(United States) J. J. Wolf	5–7, 1–6
Loss	2–4	Sep 2026	Cassis, France	Challenger	Hard	(France) Titouan Droguet	4–6, 6–7^{(3–7)}

== ITF World Tennis Tour finals ==
=== Singles: 5 (3 titles, 2 runner-ups) ===
Legend ITF WTT (3–2)

Result	W–L	Date	Tournament	Tier	Surface	Opponent	Score
Win	1–0	May 2022	M15 Heraklion, Greece	WTT	Hard	(Czech Republic) Dominik Palán	6–4, 6–3
Win	2–0	Aug 2022	M15 Monastir, Tunisia	WTT	Hard	(France) Constantin Bittoun Kouzmine	6–2, 3–6, 6–3
Loss	2–1	Aug 2022	M15 Monastir, Tunisia	WTT	Hard	(China) Te Rigele	3–6, 6–3, 5–7
Loss	2–2	Sep 2022	M25 Bagnères-de-Bigorre, France	WTT	Hard	(Belgium) Joris De Loore	3–6, 0–6
Win	3–2	Dec 2022	M25 Monastir, Tunisia	WTT	Hard	(China) Bu Yunchaokete	6–4, 6–1
