= Nishesh Basavareddy =

American tennis player (born 2005)

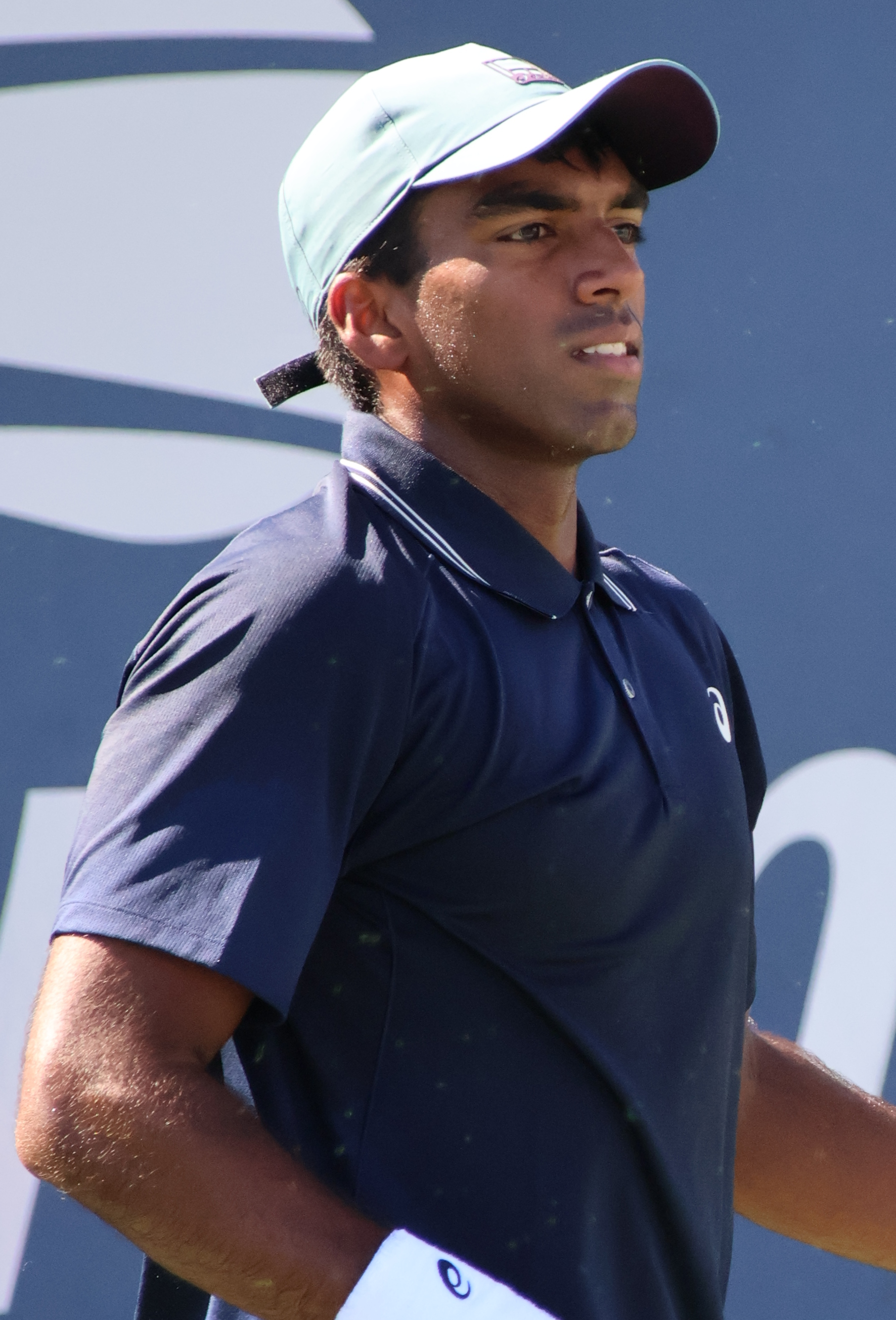
- Basavareddy at the 2026 US Open
- Country (sports): United States
- Born: May 2, 2005 (age 21) Newport Beach, California, US
- Height: 5 ft 11 in (1.80 m)
- Turned pro: December 2024
- Plays: Right-handed (two-handed backhand)
- College: Stanford University
- Coach: Gilles Cervara (Dec 2025–Apr 2026)
- Prize money: US $1,828,333

Singles
- Career record: 13–23 (at ATP Tour level, Grand Slam level, and in Davis Cup)
- Career titles: 0
- Highest ranking: No. 99 (June 23, 2025)
- Current ranking: No. 117 (November 16, 2026)

Grand Slam singles results
- Australian Open: 2R (2026)
- French Open: 2R (2026)
- Wimbledon: 1R (2025)
- US Open: 1R (2025, 2026)

Doubles
- Career record: 0–0 (at ATP Tour level, Grand Slam level, and in Davis Cup)
- Career titles: 0
- Highest ranking: No. 676 (November 25, 2024)
- Last updated on: November 16, 2026.

Nishesh Basavareddy (born May 2, 2005) is an American professional tennis player. He has a career-high ATP singles ranking of world No. 99 achieved on June 23, 2025 and a doubles ranking of No. 676, reached on November 25, 2024.

== Early life ==
Basavareddy was born in Newport Beach, California, to father Muralikrishna Basavereddy and mother Sai Prasanna. His parents emigrated from Nellore, India to the United States in 1999. His older brother, Nishanth, was born in San Francisco. The family lived for 8 years in Irvine, California, as his father worked at Toyota, and then Basavareddy relocated with his family to Carmel, Indiana when he was 8 years old. He started taking tennis lessons in his childhood. Basavareddy graduated from Carmel High School. Basavareddy is of Indian descent.

His tennis idols are Novak Djokovic and Rajeev Ram.

== Junior tennis ==
In 2022, he won three reputable junior events: J1 Porto Alegre, JA Criciúma – Banana Bowl, and JA Milan. He also won the U14-category at prestigious Orange Bowl and was a member of the U.S. U14 team that won the World Junior Team Finals in the Czech Republic. However, his best result in juniors was the boys' doubles title at the 2022 US Open, with countryman Ozan Baris.

Basavareddy had good results in Juniors, maintaining a 69–17 singles win-loss record and reached an ITF junior combined ranking of world No. 3 on 2 January 2023.

== College years ==
Basavareddy entered Stanford University in the fall of 2022. As a freshman during the 2022-23 season, he won the ITA Fall National Championship and was named an ITA All-American. He was selected for the All-Pac-12 second team and earned ITA Northwest Region Rookie of the Year honors. He finished the season ranked No. 16 in singles and No. 22 in doubles, with a career-high ranking of No. 2 in singles. He won the ITA Northwest Super Regional and advanced to the round of 16 in both singles and doubles at the NCAA Championships.

In his sophomore season (2023–24), he won the Pac-12 Singles Player of the Year award and was named to the All-Pac-12 first team. He earned ITA All-America honors for the second consecutive year and was named ITA Northwest Region Player to Watch. He helped Stanford win the Pac-12 regular-season title, the program’s first since 2021. He ended the season ranked No. 12 in singles, with a 16-2 overall record and an 11-2 mark against ranked opponents. He also recorded three Pac-12 Player of the Week honors and reached the round of 16 at the NCAA Singles Championship. Off the court, he was named to the CSC Academic All-America second team and the Pac-12 Academic Honor Roll.

== Professional career ==
=== 2024: Top 150 & Pro debuts, NextGen Finals & maiden ATP win ===
Basavareddy reached the top 200, at No. 199 in September 2024, following his third Challenger final at the 2024 LTP Men's Open. He won his maiden title later that season, at the 2024 Tiburon Challenger, defeating compatriot Eliot Spizzirri in the final.

Following a runner-up at the 2024 Champaign Challenger and a second Challenger title at the 2024 Puerto Vallarta Open, Basavareddy reached the top 150, with a career-high singles ranking of No. 139 on 25 November 2024.

Basavareddy also qualified for the 2024 Next Generation ATP Finals where he recorded his first ATP win. Following the qualification, he announced he turned professional on 5 December 2024, foregoing his NCAA eligibility.

=== 2025: ATP, Major, Masters & top 100 debuts, ATP semifinal ===
Basavareddy made his ATP main draw debut at the 2025 Brisbane International after qualifying for the main draw with wins over former top-100 player Borna Gojo and former top-10 player Lucas Pouille. He lost to Gaël Monfils in three sets. A week later he also qualified for the main draw at the 2025 ASB Classic in Auckland and recorded his second win and first in an ATP main draw over lucky loser Francisco Comesaña in straight sets. He defeated the defending champion and world No. 23 Alejandro Tabilo in three sets to reach his maiden ATP quarterfinal and move into the top 115 in the rankings. Next, he defeated eight seed and compatriot Alex Michelsen to reach his first ATP semifinal and moved onto the top 110 in the ATP singles rankings. He became the youngest American to reach a tour-level semifinal on hardcourts since an 18-year-old Reilly Opelka in 2016 in Atlanta. However, he then fell to Gaël Monfils in the semifinals in two tough sets.

Basavareddy received a main draw wildcard for his Grand Slam debut at the 2025 Australian Open. He lost in the first round to Novak Djokovic, but not before taking the first set against the former #1. He impressed Djokovic and the crowd with his performance in the match with a final score of 6-4, 3-6, 4-6, 2-6. Basavareddy qualified for the main draw of the 2025 Acupulco Open but lost to Denis Shapovalov, and followed that up with first round losses in Indian Wells on his Masters debut, and at the 2025 Țiriac Open. He defeated Otto Virtanen at the Open Aix Provence before losing to eventual finalist Stan Wawrinka.

Basavareddy reached the top 100 in the ATP singles rankings at world No. 99 on 23 June 2025 before the 2025 Wimbledon Championships, where he made his main draw debut. He also made his debut at the 2025 US Open having received a wildcard for the main draw.

=== 2026: French Open wildcard, first top 10 win ===
Basavareddy received a main draw wildcard for the 2026 French Open, following winning the USTA’s Roland Garros Wild Card Challenge.

== Performance timeline ==
Key
W	F	SF	QF	#R	RR	Q#	P#	DNQ	A	Z#	PO	G	S	B	NMS	NTI	P	NH

(W) winner; (F) finalist; (SF) semifinalist; (QF) quarterfinalist; (#R) rounds 4, 3, 2, 1; (RR) round-robin stage; (Q#) qualification round; (P#) preliminary round; (DNQ) did not qualify; (A) absent; (Z#) Davis/Fed Cup Zonal Group (with number indication) or (PO) play-off; (G) gold, (S) silver or (B) bronze Olympic/Paralympic medal; (NMS) not a Masters tournament; (NTI) not a Tier I tournament; (P) postponed; (NH) not held; (SR) strike rate (events won / competed); (W–L) win–loss record.
To avoid confusion and double counting, these charts are updated at the conclusion of a tournament or when the player's participation has ended.

=== Singles ===
Current through the 2026 U.S. Men's Clay Court Championships.

Tournament	2024	2025	2026	SR	W–L	Win%
Grand Slam tournaments
Australian Open	A	1R	2R	0 / 2	1–2	33%
French Open	A	Q1		0 / 0	0–0	–
Wimbledon	A	1R		0 / 1	0–1	0%
US Open	Q3	1R		0 / 1	0–1	0%
Win–loss	0–0	0–3	1–1	0 / 4	1–4	20%
ATP Masters 1000
Indian Wells Open	A	1R	A	0 / 1	0–1	0%
Miami Open	A	A	Q1	0 / 0	0–0	–
Monte-Carlo Masters	A	A	A	0 / 0	0–0	–
Madrid Open	A	Q1	A	0 / 0	0–0	–
Italian Open	A	Q2	A	0 / 0	0–0	–
Canadian Open	A	A		0 / 0	0–0	–
Cincinnati Open	A	2R		0 / 1	1–1	50%
Shanghai Masters	A	Q1		0 / 0	0–0	–
Paris Masters	A	A		0 / 0	0–0	–
Win–loss	0–0	1–2	0–0	0 / 2	1–2	33%
Career statistics
Tournaments	0	14	2	16		
Overall win–loss	1–2	9–15	2–2	12–19		39%
Year-end ranking	138	155	–	$1,325,804		

== ATP Challenger and ITF Tour finals ==
=== Singles: 11 (4 titles, 7 runner-ups) ===
Legend ATP Challenger Tour (4–6) ITF WTT (0–1)	Finals by surface Hard (3–7) Clay (1–0)

Result	W–L	Date	Tournament	Tier	Surface	Opponent	Score
Loss	0–1	Oct 2023	Fairfield Challenger, US	Challenger	Hard	(United States) Zachary Svajda	4–6, 1–6
Loss	0–2	Jul 2024	Cranbrook Tennis Classic, US	Challenger	Hard	(United States) Learner Tien	6–4, 3–6, 4–6
Loss	0–3	Sep 2024	LTP Men's Open, US	Challenger	Hard	(Lithuania) Edas Butvilas	4–6, 3–6
Win	1–3	Sep 2024	Tiburon Challenger, US	Challenger	Hard	(United States) Eliot Spizzirri	6–1, 6–1
Loss	1–4	Oct 2024	Charlottesville Men's Pro Challenger, US	Challenger	Hard (i)	(Japan) James Trotter	3–6, 4–6
Loss	1–5	Nov 2024	Champaign Challenger, US	Challenger	Hard (i)	(United States) Ethan Quinn	3–6, 1–6
Win	2–5	Nov 2024	Puerto Vallarta Open, Mexico	Challenger	Hard	(Canada) Liam Draxl	6–3, 7–6^{(7–4)}
Win	3–5	Apr 2026	Savannah Challenger, US	Challenger	Clay	(United States) Jack Kennedy	6–3, 6–0
Win	4–5	Sep 2026	San Diego Challenger, US	Challenger	Hard	(Brazil) Igor Marcondes	7–5, 6–4
Loss	4–6	Nov 2026	CO'Met Orléans Open, France	Challenger	Hard (i)	(Finland) Otto Virtanen	2–6, 3–6

Result	W–L	Date	Tournament	Tier	Surface	Opponent	Score
Loss	0–1	Mar 2024	M25 Calabasas, US	WTT	Hard	(United States) Trevor Svajda	4–6, 1–6

=== Doubles: 2 (1 title, 1 runner-up) ===
Legend ATP Challenger Tour (0–1) ITF WTT (1–0)	Finals by surface Hard (0–1) Clay (1–0)

Result	W–L	Date	Tournament	Tier	Surface	Partner	Opponents	Score
Loss	0–1	Jul 2024	Cranbrook Tennis Classic, US	Challenger	Hard	(United States) Ozan Baris	(United States) Ryan Seggerman (United States) Patrik Trhac	6–4, 3–6, [6–10]

Result	W–L	Date	Tournament	Tier	Surface	Partner	Opponents	Score
Win	1–0	Apr 2022	M15 Vero Beach, US	WTT	Clay	(Venezuela) Ricardo Rodríguez-Pace	(United Kingdom) Millen Hurrion (Canada) Liam Draxl	6–4, 6–3

== Junior Grand Slam finals ==
=== Doubles: 1 (title) ===
Result	Year	Tournament	Surface	Partner	Opponents	Score
Win	2022	US Open	Hard	(United States) Ozan Baris	(Switzerland) Dylan Dietrich (Bolivia) Juan Carlos Prado Ángelo	6–1, 6–1

== Wins over top-10 players ==
- Basavareddy has a 1–3 (25%) match record against players who were, at the time the match was played, ranked in the top 10.

Season	2026	Total
Wins	1	1

#	Player	Rk	Event	Surface	Rd	Score	Rk	Ref
2026
1.	(United States) Taylor Fritz	9	French Open, France	Clay	1R	7–6^{(7–5)}, 7–6^{(7–5)}, 6–7^{(9–11)}, 6–1	148	

- Key: (Rk) first use, opponent rank; (Rd) round; (Rk) 2nd use, player rank; (Ref) reference; (F) final; (SF) semifinal; (QF) quarterfinal; (#R) rounds 4, 3, 2, 1; (RR) round-robin stage; (Q#) qualifying rounds or stages (3), 2, 1.

*As of 25 May 2026
