= Huang Tsung-hao =

Taiwanese tennis player (born 1999)

- Country (sports): Chinese Taipei
- Born: 22 November 1999 (age 26) Pingtung City, Taiwan
- Height: 1.73 m (5 ft 8 in)
- Plays: Right-handed (two-handed backhand)
- Prize money: US $126,331

Singles
- Career record: 0–3 (at ATP Tour level, Grand Slam level, and in Davis Cup)
- Career titles: 2 ITF
- Highest ranking: No. 474 (29 September 2025)
- Current ranking: No. 791 (14 September 2026)

Doubles
- Career record: 2–0 (at ATP Tour level, Grand Slam level, and in Davis Cup)
- Career titles: 1 Challenger, 12 ITF
- Highest ranking: No. 153 (23 February 2026)
- Current ranking: No. 268 (14 September 2026)
- Last updated on: 16 September 2026.

Huang Tsung-hao (Chinese: 黃琮豪, born 22 November 1999) is a Taiwanese tennis player. Huang has a career high ATP singles ranking of world No. 474 achieved on 29 September 2025 and a doubles ranking of No. 153 achieved on 23 February 2026.

Huang represents Chinese Taipei at the Davis Cup, where he has a win-loss record of 1–2.

== Career ==
Huang won the ATP Challenger doubles title at the 2025 Cranbrook Tennis Classic and reached the final at the 2025 Lexington Open with Hsu Yu-hsiou.
