= Michael Zheng =

American tennis player (born 2004)

- Zheng at the 2026 Wimbledon Championships
- Country (sports): United States
- Born: January 27, 2004 (age 22) Chesapeake, Virginia, US
- Height: 6 ft 2 in (1.88 m)
- Plays: Right-handed (two-handed backhand)
- College: Columbia
- Coach: Ruan Roelofse
- Prize money: US $1,150,206

Singles
- Career record: 8–9 (at ATP Tour level, Grand Slam level, and in Davis Cup)
- Career titles: 3 Challenger
- Highest ranking: No. 88 (September 14, 2026)
- Current ranking: No. 100 (September 21, 2026)

Grand Slam singles results
- Australian Open: 2R (2026)
- French Open: 1R (2026)
- Wimbledon: 3R (2026)
- US Open: 3R (2026)

Doubles
- Career record: 0–0 (at ATP Tour level, Grand Slam level, and in Davis Cup)
- Career titles: 0
- Highest ranking: No. 490 (August 25, 2025)
- Last updated on: September 14, 2026.

Michael Zheng (Chinese: 郑瑞 pinyin: Zhèng Ruì, born January 27, 2004) is an American professional tennis player. He has a career-high ATP singles ranking of world No. 88 achieved on 14 September 2026 and a doubles ranking of No. 490 reached in August 2025.

== Early life ==
Zheng was born to Joe Zheng and Mei. His parents emigrated from Hubei, China, to the United States. He was raised in Montville, New Jersey. Zheng attended Delbarton School, where he won the state singles tennis championship in 2021. For his senior year, he transferred to Dwight Global Online School in order to accommodate his travel demands for tennis.

== College ==
In 2025–26, Zheng was a senior playing tennis at Columbia University. In the 2022–23 season, his first year at Columbia, he became the first first-year student athlete at the school to be named an ITA All-American, in addition to being the first Ivy League tennis player to win Ivy League Player of the Year, Rookie of the Year, and First-Team All-Ivy in singles and doubles all in the same season.

He represented Columbia at the 2023 NCAA tennis tournament in singles, where he was eliminated by Michigan's Ondřej Štyler in the Round of 16. In his sophomore season, Zheng reached the final of the 2024 NCAA Division I tennis men's singles championships, where he lost to Filip Planinšek of Alabama. In the start of his junior year, the NCAA decided to move up the individual NCAA tournaments to the fall season instead of the spring season. There he once again reached the final of the Division I tennis men's singles championships. On November 24, 2024, he defeated Ozan Baris of Michigan State to become the first NCAA singles champion from Columbia since 1906, and the first Ivy League NCAA singles champion since 1922. On November 23, 2025, Zheng defeated Trevor Svajda of SMU to become the first back-to-back NCAA champion since Steve Johnson in 2011 & 2012.

== Career ==
=== 2022: Juniors ===
Zheng reached the final of the Wimbledon boys' singles tournament in 2022, losing in the final to Mili Poljičak.

=== 2023–25: Challenger titles ===
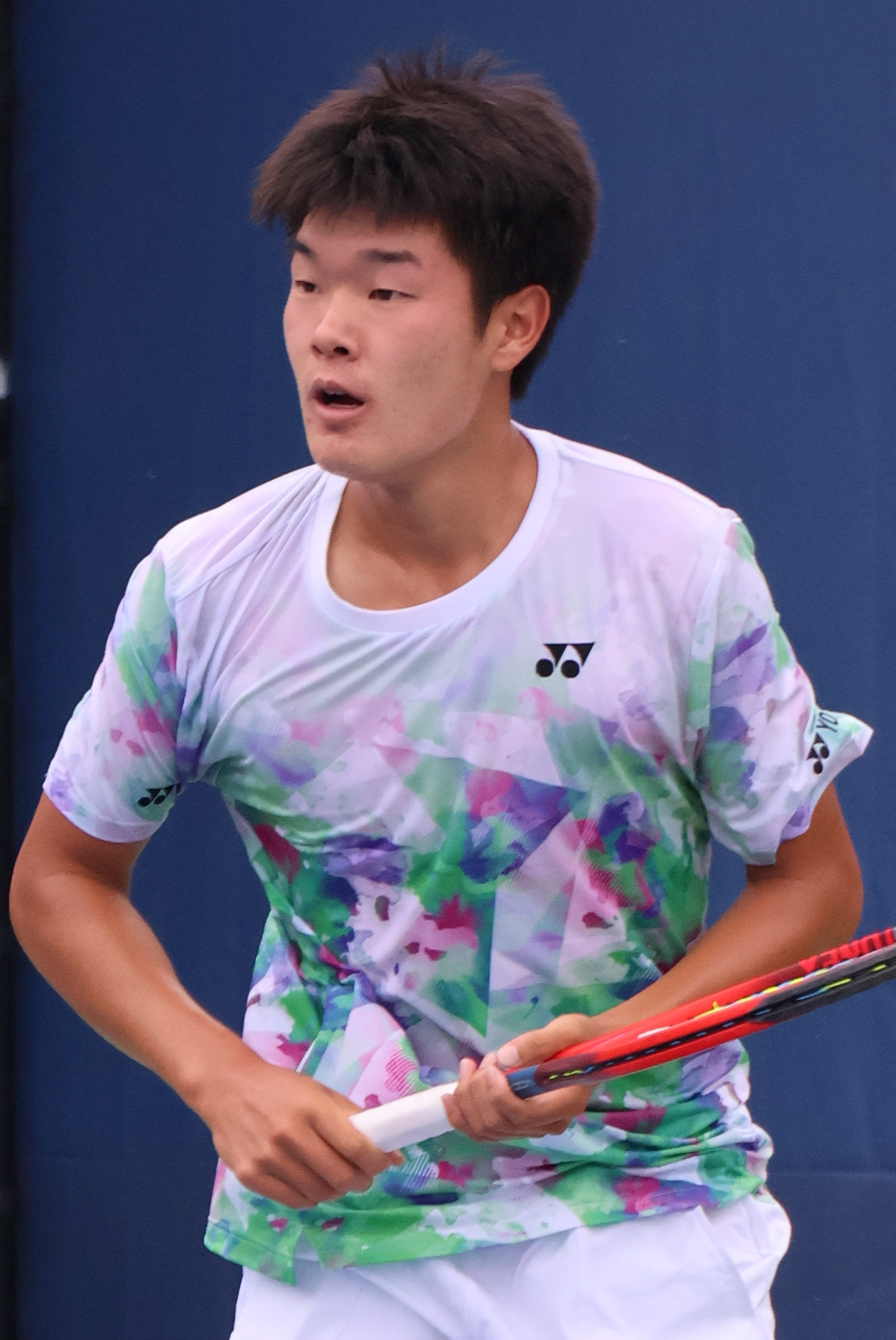
Zheng at the 2023 US Open

In June 2023, Zheng reached his first ATP Challenger final at the 2023 Caribbean Open, losing to Kei Nishikori. In May 2025, Zheng reached the final of the 2025 Little Rock Challenger, losing to Patrick Kypson. In July, Zheng reached his first Challenger doubles final at the 2025 Cranbrook Tennis Classic with Theodore Winegar. In August, Zheng won his first Challenger title in Chicago, defeating Hsu Yu-hsiou in the final.

He then won two more Challenger titles at Columbus and Tiburon with a 15 matches win streak.

=== 2026: Major, Masters debuts and three third rounds, top 100 ===
Zheng made it through three rounds of qualifying matches, including a tight 4–6, 6–3, 7–6^{(12–10)} three-set win over Lukáš Klein, to make the main draw at the 2026 Australian Open, his first main draw appearance at a Grand Slam. In the first round, he defeated Sebastian Korda in five sets, marking his first win at a Grand Slam main draw. Zheng made his Masters 1000 debut in Indian Wells after receiving a main draw wildcard.

He qualified for the 2026 French Open, making his main draw debut at Roland Garros. He also qualified and reached the third round at the 2026 Wimbledon Championships, on his debut, upsetting 26th seed, home favorite and British No. 1 Cameron Norrie and then fellow qualifier Nicolas Mejia.

At the 2026 Cincinnati Open Zheng reached the third round as a qualifier, on his debut at this Masters. At the US Open he reached a second consecutive Grand Slam third round as a wildcard, defeating lucky loser Yunchaokete Bu. As a result he reached the top 100 in the singles rankings at world No. 88, on 14 September 2026.

== Performance timeline ==
Key
W	F	SF	QF	#R	RR	Q#	DNQ	A	NH

(W) winner; (F) finalist; (SF) semifinalist; (QF) quarterfinalist; (#R) rounds 4, 3, 2, 1; (RR) round-robin stage; (Q#) qualification round; (DNQ) did not qualify; (A) absent; (NH) not held; (SR) strike rate (events won / competed); (W–L) win–loss record.

=== Singles ===
Tournament	2023	2024	2025	2026	SR	W–L	Win%
Grand Slam tournaments
Australian Open	A	A	A	2R	0 / 1	1–1	50%
French Open	A	A	A	1R	0 / 1	0–1	0%
Wimbledon	A	A	A	3R	0 / 1	2–1	67%
US Open	Q2	Q1	Q2	3R	0 / 1	2–1	67%
Win–loss	0–0	0–0	0–0	5–4	0 / 4	5–4	56%
ATP Masters 1000
Indian Wells				1R	0 / 1	0–1	0%
Canada Open				1R	0 / 1	0–1	0%
Cincinnati Open				3R	0 / 1	2–1	67%
Career statistics
Tournaments	0	0	0	9	0		
Overall win–loss	0–0	0–0	0–0	8–9	8–9	0 / 9	47%
Year-end ranking	533	759	188				

== ATP Challenger and ITF World Tennis Tour finals ==
=== Singles: 7 (4 titles, 3 runner-ups) ===
Legend ATP Challenger Tour (3–2) ITF WTT (1–1)	Finals by surface Hard (4–2) Clay (0–1)

Result	W–L	Date	Tournament	Tier	Surface	Opponent	Score
Loss	0–1	Jun 2023	Caribbean Open, Puerto Rico	Challenger	Hard	(Japan) Kei Nishikori	2–6, 5–7
Loss	0–2	May 2025	Little Rock Challenger, US	Challenger	Hard	(United States) Patrick Kypson	1–6, 6–1, 5–7
Win	1–2	Aug 2025	Chicago Challenger, US	Challenger	Hard	(Chinese Taipei) Hsu Yu-hsiou	6–4, 6–2
Win	2–2	Sep 2025	Columbus Challenger, US	Challenger	Hard (i)	(United States) Martin Damm	3–6, 6–3, 7–5
Win	3–2	Sep 2025	Tiburon Challenger, US	Challenger	Hard	(United States) Tyler Zink	6–4, 6–4

Result	W–L	Date	Tournament	Tier	Surface	Opponent	Score
Loss	0–1	Apr 2022	M15 Orange Park, US	WTT	Clay	(China) Wu Yibing	6–7^{(4–7)}, 5–7
Win	1–1	Aug 2024	M25 Southaven, US	WTT	Hard	(United States) Tyler Zink	6–4, 7–6^{(7–3)}

=== Doubles: 3 (1 title, 2 runner-ups) ===
Legend ATP Challenger Tour (0–2) ITF WTT (1–0)	Finals by surface Hard (1–2) Clay (0–0)

Result	W–L	Date	Tournament	Tier	Surface	Partner	Opponents	Score
Loss	0–1	Jul 2025	Cranbrook Tennis Classic, US	Challenger	Hard	(United States) Theodore Winegar	(Chinese Taipei) Hsu Yu-hsiou (Chinese Taipei) Huang Tsung-hao	6–4, 3–6, [9–11]
Loss	0–2	Aug 2025	Chicago Challenger, US	Challenger	Hard	(United States) Theodore Winegar	(United States) Mac Kiger (United States) Ryan Seggerman	4–6, 6–3, [5–10]

Result	W–L	Date	Tournament	Tier	Surface	Partner	Opponents	Score
Win	1–0	Aug 2024	M25 Southaven, US	WTT	Hard	(United Kingdom) Lui Maxted	(United States) Keshav Chopra (United States) Andres Martin	6–2, 6–4

== Junior Grand Slam finals ==
=== Singles: 1 (runner-up) ===
Result	Year	Tournament	Surface	Opponent	Score
Loss	2022	Wimbledon	Grass	(Croatia) Mili Poljičak	6–7^{(2–7)}, 6–7^{(3–7)}
