= Andres Martin (tennis) =

American tennis player

- Country (sports): United States
- Born: 7 July 2001 (age 25) Flowery Branch, Georgia
- Height: 6 ft 0 in (1.83 m)
- Plays: Right-handed (two-handed backhand)
- College: Georgia Tech
- Coach: Glen Hill
- Prize money: US $260,361

Singles
- Career record: 1–4
- Career titles: 0
- Highest ranking: No. 250 (March 30, 2026)
- Current ranking: No. 314 (August 31, 2026)

Grand Slam singles results
- US Open: Q2 (2025)

Doubles
- Career record: 0–3
- Career titles: 0
- Highest ranking: No. 279 (March 2, 2026)
- Current ranking: No. 459 (August 31, 2026)
- Last updated on: September 1, 2026.

Andres Martin (Spanish: Andrés Martín; born July 7, 2001) is an American tennis player. He has a career-high ATP singles ranking of world No. 250 achieved and a high doubles ranking of No. 279 both achieved in March 2026.

== Personal life ==
His mother Andrea and father Rafael moved to Flowery Branch, Georgia in 2001 having previously lived in Atlanta, Georgia. He has a younger sister named Eva.

== College career ==
He turned down offers from Stanford, Dartmouth and Columbia University, amongst others, to become a student at Georgia Tech where he studied for an engineering major.

== Professional career ==
=== 2021: ATP doubles debut ===
He made his ATP tour debut as a wildcard at the 2021 Atlanta Open, playing doubles alongside Keshav Chopra.

=== 2022-24: ATP singles debut ===
He made his ATP Tour singles debut at the 2022 Atlanta Open as a wildcard and in the first round defeated Thanasi Kokkinakis for his first ATP win.

He also received a wildcard for the main draw of the 2023 Atlanta Open and of the 2024 Atlanta Open. Ranked at a career-high ranking of No. 470, he also entered the qualifying competition at the 2024 Winston-Salem Open as an alternate. Alongside Keshav Chopra he reached the men’s doubles final at the M25 Southaven tournament in the United States in August 2024, losing against the pairing of Michael Zheng and Lui Maxted in straight sets in the final.

=== 2025-26: Doubles Challenger title & singles final, top 250 ===
In July, Martin won his first Challenger title in doubles with Keshav Chopra at the Winnipeg National Bank Challenger and reached his first Challenger singles final at the Cranbrook Tennis Classic. He lost to Mark Lajal in the final but made his top 300 debut rising 60 positions to a career-high ranking of No. 275 on 29 July 2025.

== ATP Challenger Tour finals ==
=== Singles: 1 (0 titles, 1 runner-up) ===
Legend ATP Challenger Tour (0–1)	Titles by surface Hard (0–1) Clay (0–0)

Result	W–L	Date	Tournament	Tier	Surface	Opponent	Score
Loss	0-1	Jul 2025	Bloomfield Hills, United States	Challenger	Hard	(Estonia) Mark Lajal	7–6^{(9–7)}, 5–7, 6–7^{(9–11)}

=== Doubles: 2 (1 title, 1 runner-up) ===
Legend ATP Challenger Tour (1–1)	Finals by surface Hard (1–1)

Result	W–L	Date	Tournament	Tier	Surface	Partner	Opponents	Score
Win	1-0	July 2025	Winnipeg Challenger, Canada	Challenger	Hard	(United States) Keshav Chopra	(Japan) Naoki Nakagawa (South Africa) Kris van Wyk	7–6^{(7–2)}, 3–6, [10–3]
Loss	1-1	Feb 2026	Baton Rouge Challenger, United States	Challenger	Hard (i)	(United States) Ronald Hohmann	(United States) Alafia Ayeni (United States) Keegan Smith	7–5, 3–6, [7–10]

== ITF World Tennis Tour finals ==
=== Singles: 3 (1 title, 3 runner ups) ===
Legend (singles) ITF World Tennis Tour (1–3)	Titles by surface Hard (1–3)

Result	W–L	Date	Tournament	Tier	Surface	Opponent	Score
Loss	0-1	Jun 2022	M25 East Lansing, USA	World Tennis Tour	Hard	(Canada) Gabriel Diallo	3–6, 6–7^{(4–7)}
Win	1-1	Sep 2023	M15 Monastir, Tunisia	World Tennis Tour	Hard	(France) Constantin Bittoun Kouzmine	6–2, 6–4
Loss	1-2	Jan 2025	M15 Kingston, Jamaica	World Tennis Tour	Hard	(Canada) Juan Carlos Aguilar	5–7, 2–6
Loss	1-3	July 2025	M25 Calabasas, USA	World Tennis Tour	Hard	(United States) Stefan Dostanic	6–2, 4–6, 3–6
