= 2026 Sioux Falls Challenger – Singles =

Singles
- 2026 Sioux Falls Challenger

Final
- Champion: (Switzerland) Dylan Dietrich
- Runner-up: (Canada) Liam Draxl
- Score: 1–6, 6–3, 6–4

Events
Singles	Doubles
- Sioux Falls Challenger

Patrick Kypson was the defending champion but chose not to defend his title.

Dylan Dietrich won the title after defeating Liam Draxl 1–6, 6–3, 6–4 in the final.

== Seeds ==
1. (United States) Jenson Brooksby (second round)
2. (France) Valentin Royer (second round)
3. (United States) Darwin Blanch (quarterfinals)
4. (Canada) Alexis Galarneau (first round)
5. (Canada) Liam Draxl (final)
6. (United States) Braden Shick (first round)
7. (United Kingdom) Harry Wendelken (first round)
8. (Poland) Maks Kaśnikowski (second round)

== Draw ==
Key

- Q = Qualifier
- WC = Wild card
- LL = Lucky loser
- Alt = Alternate
- ITF = ITF entry
- PR = Protected ranking
- SR = Special ranking
- SE = Special exempt
- JE = Junior exempt
- JR = Junior Accelerator Programme entrant
- CO = College Accelerator Programme entrant
- NG = Next Gen Accelerator Program entrant
- w/o = Walkover
- r = Retired
- d = Defaulted

=== Finals ===
Semifinals
(Switzerland) Dylan Dietrich	6	6
Alt	(United States) Aidan Mayo	4	2
5	(Canada) Liam Draxl	6^{7}	7^{8}	6
Q	(Slovenia) Sebastian Dominko	7^{9}	6^{6}	4

Final
(Switzerland) Dylan Dietrich	1	6	6
5	(Canada) Liam Draxl	6	3	4

=== Top half ===
First round
1/SE	(United States) J Brooksby	6	6
WC	(United States) Bry Nakashima	3	3
(Switzerland) D Dietrich	6	7
(United States) C Smith	3	5
(United States) JJ Wolf	6	6
(Jordan) A Shelbayh	3	1
(United States) D Milavsky	6	4	6
7	(United Kingdom) H Wendelken	4	6	3
4	(Canada) A Galarneau	3	4
(Netherlands) M Röttgering	6	6
(United States) A Martin	3	4
WC	(United States) K Bigun	6	6
Alt	(United States) A Mayo	6	6
(Czech Republic) H Bartoň	2	3
Q	(Japan) J Trotter	1	2
8	(Poland) M Kaśnikowski	6	6

Second round
1/SE	(United States) J Brooksby	3	3
(Switzerland) D Dietrich	6	6
(United States) JJ Wolf	7^{9}	7^{7}
(United States) D Milavsky	6^{7}	6^{3}
(Netherlands) M Röttgering	6	7^{7}
WC	(United States) K Bigun	4	6^{3}
Alt	(United States) A Mayo	6	6^{4}	7
8	(Poland) M Kaśnikowski	2	7^{7}	5

Quarterfinals
(Switzerland) D Dietrich	6	7
(United States) JJ Wolf	2	5
(Netherlands) M Röttgering	3	4
Alt	(United States) A Mayo	6	6

Semifinals
(Switzerland) D Dietrich	6	6
Alt	(United States) A Mayo	4	2

=== Bottom half ===
First round
5	(Canada) L Draxl	7^{10}	7^{7}
Q	(Poland) T Berkieta	6^{8}	6^{1}
Q	D Ostapenkov	6	6
LL	(United States) O Baris	1	1
(United States) M Krueger	6	6
(Ecuador) A Andrade	3	0
WC	(United States) S Gorzny	4	2
3	(United States) Dar Blanch	6	6
6	(United States) B Shick	3	3
(Germany) MH Rehberg	6	6
(United States) S Kozlov	4	6	3
(United States) M Cassone	6	3	0^{r}
Q	(Slovenia) Sebastian Dominko	6	7^{7}
Q	(United States) K Poling	4	6^{1}
Q	(France) T Legout	3	6^{6}
2	(France) V Royer	6	7^{8}

Second round
5	(Canada) L Draxl	4
Q	D Ostapenkov	5^{r}
(United States) M Krueger	7^{7}	4	5
3	(United States) Dar Blanch	6^{5}	6	7
(Germany) MH Rehberg	7	6
(United States) S Kozlov	5	4
Q	(Slovenia) S Dominko	7	7
2	(France) V Royer	5	5

Quarterfinals
5	(Canada) L Draxl	6	3	6
3	(United States) Dar Blanch	3	6	0
(Germany) MH Rehberg	6^{4}	4
Q	(Slovenia) S Dominko	7^{7}	6

Semifinals
5	(Canada) L Draxl	6^{7}	7^{8}	6
Q	(Slovenia) S Dominko	7^{9}	6^{6}	4
