= 2024 Sioux Falls Challenger – Singles =

Singles
- 2024 Sioux Falls Challenger

Final
- Champion: (Croatia) Borna Gojo
- Runner-up: (United States) Colton Smith
- Score: 6–1, 7–5

Events
Singles	Doubles
- Sioux Falls Challenger

This was the first edition of the tournament.

Borna Gojo won the title after defeating Colton Smith 6–1, 7–5 in the final.

== Seeds ==
1. (United States) Christopher Eubanks (quarterfinals)
2. (United States) Mitchell Krueger (first round)
3. (United States) Zachary Svajda (second round)
4. (Poland) Maks Kaśnikowski (first round)
5. (Kazakhstan) Dmitry Popko (first round)
6. (United States) Patrick Kypson (quarterfinals)
7. (United States) Nishesh Basavareddy (first round)
8. (United States) Brandon Holt (quarterfinals)

== Draw ==
Key

- Q = Qualifier
- WC = Wild card
- LL = Lucky loser
- Alt = Alternate
- ITF = ITF entry
- PR = Protected ranking
- SR = Special ranking
- SE = Special exempt
- JE = Junior exempt
- JR = Junior Accelerator Programme entrant
- CO = College Accelerator Programme entrant
- NG = Next Gen Accelerator Program entrant
- w/o = Walkover
- r = Retired
- d = Defaulted

=== Finals ===
Semifinals
SE	(United States) Murphy Cassone	2	7	5
WC	(United States) Colton Smith	6	5	7
(Estonia) Mark Lajal	6^{1}	4
Q	(Croatia) Borna Gojo	7^{7}	6

Final
WC	(United States) Colton Smith	1	5
Q	(Croatia) Borna Gojo	6	7

=== Top half ===
First round
1	(United States) C Eubanks	6	7^{9}
Q	(United States) K Smith	4	6^{7}
(Canada) A Galarneau	6	6
Q	(United States) C Woestendick	4	3
SE	(United States) M Cassone	6	6
Q	(France) A Ghibaudo	4	4
(United States) S Kozlov	7^{7}	4	6
5	(Kazakhstan) D Popko	6^{3}	6	4
4	(Poland) M Kaśnikowski	7^{9}	4	1
WC	(United Kingdom) K Edmund	6^{7}	6	6
WC	(United States) C Smith	5	7^{7}	6
(United States) M Damm	7	6^{3}	1
PR	(United Kingdom) A Gray	6	4	3
(United States) O Baris	3	6	6
SE	(United States) G Nanda	6	6
7	(United States) N Basavareddy	4	4

Second round
1	(United States) C Eubanks	3	6	7^{7}
(Canada) A Galarneau	6	2	6^{3}
SE	(United States) M Cassone	w/o
(United States) S Kozlov
WC	(United Kingdom) K Edmund	6^{3}	4
WC	(United States) C Smith	7^{7}	6
(United States) O Baris	7^{7}	6
SE	(United States) G Nanda	6^{4}	4

Quarterfinals
1	(United States) C Eubanks	6^{3}	6	5
SE	(United States) M Cassone	7^{7}	4	7
WC	(United States) C Smith	6	4	6
(United States) O Baris	4	6	4

Semifinals
SE	(United States) M Cassone	2	7	5
WC	(United States) C Smith	6	5	7

=== Bottom half ===
First round
6	(United States) P Kypson	6	6^{5}	6
(United States) E Quinn	3	7^{7}	3
(United States) A Mayo	6	6
WC	(United States) M Forbes	2	4
LL	(United States) O Kumar	2	0
(Estonia) M Lajal	6	6
Q	Martin Borisiouk	6	3	5
3	(United States) Z Svajda	1	6	7
8	(United States) B Holt	6	6
(France) E Couacaud	2	2
(United States) E Spizzirri	6	6
Q	(United States) A Martin	0	3
Alt	(Slovenia) B Artnak	2	4
(United States) D Kudla	6	6
Q	(Croatia) B Gojo	6	6
2	(United States) M Krueger	3	2

Second round
6	(United States) P Kypson	7^{7}	6
(United States) A Mayo	6^{5}	2
(Estonia) M Lajal	3	6	6
3	(United States) Z Svajda	6	2	0
8	(United States) B Holt	6	6
(United States) E Spizzirri	4	3
(United States) D Kudla	6	0	5
Q	(Croatia) B Gojo	4	6	7

Quarterfinals
6	(United States) P Kypson	6^{3}	3
(Estonia) M Lajal	7^{7}	6
8	(United States) B Holt	6	6^{1}	2
Q	(Croatia) B Gojo	4	7^{7}	6

Semifinals
(Estonia) M Lajal	6^{1}	4
Q	(Croatia) B Gojo	7^{7}	6
