= 2025 Sioux Falls Challenger – Doubles =

Doubles
- 2025 Sioux Falls Challenger

Final
- Champions: (Australia) Rinky Hijikata (United States) Mac Kiger
- Runners-up: (Venezuela) Juan José Bianchi (United States) Andrew Fenty
- Score: 6–4, 6–4

Events
Singles	Doubles
← 2024 ·	Sioux Falls Challenger	· 2026 →

Liam Draxl and Cleeve Harper were the defending champions but chose to defend their title with different partners. Draxl partnered Noah Schachter but lost in the first round to Siddhant Banthia and Hans Hach Verdugo. Harper partnered David Stevenson but lost in the quarterfinals to Juan José Bianchi and Andrew Fenty.

Rinky Hijikata and Mac Kiger won the title after defeating Bianchi and Fenty 6–4, 6–4 in the final.

== Seeds ==
1. (Australia) Rinky Hijikata / (United States) Mac Kiger (champions)
2. (Canada) Cleeve Harper / (United Kingdom) David Stevenson (quarterfinals)
3. (India) Anirudh Chandrasekar / (United States) Reese Stalder (first round)
4. (India) Siddhant Banthia / (Mexico) Hans Hach Verdugo (quarterfinals)

== Draw ==
=== Key ===
- Q = Qualifier
- WC = Wild card
- LL = Lucky loser
- Alt = Alternate
- ITF = ITF entry
- PR = Protected ranking
- SR = Special ranking
- SE = Special exempt
- JE = Junior exempt
- JR = Junior Accelerator Programme entrant
- CO = College Accelerator Programme entrant
- NG = Next Gen Accelerator Program entrant
- w/o = Walkover
- r = Retired
- d = Defaulted

=== Draw ===
First round
1	(Australia) R Hijikata (United States) M Kiger	7^{8}	6^{6}	[10]
(United Kingdom) J Clarke (Antigua and Barbuda) J Maginley	6^{6}	7^{8}	[4]
(United States) M Cassone (United Kingdom) A McHugh	4	4
WC	(United States) M Exsted (United States) A Ganesan	6	6
3	(India) A Chandrasekar (United States) R Stalder	4	7^{7}	[7]
(Australia) P Harper (United Kingdom) J Monday	6	6^{1}	[10]
(Canada) D Martin (Portugal) Francisco Rocha	1	4
(United States) B Kittay (United States) J Sheehy	6	6
(Canada) J Boulais (United States) M Krueger	6	7
WC	(United States) Zachary Fuchs (United States) Wally Thayne	2	5
(Canada) L Draxl (United States) N Schachter	4	4
4	(India) S Banthia (Mexico) H Hach Verdugo	6	6
(United States) A Perez (United States) Jamie Vance	2	4
(Venezuela) Juan José Bianchi (United States) A Fenty	6	6
(Germany) M Rosenkranz (Germany) M Wiskandt	6	3	[9]
2	(Canada) C Harper (United Kingdom) D Stevenson	4	6	[11]

Quarterfinals
1	(Australia) R Hijikata (United States) M Kiger	6	1	[10]
WC	(United States) M Exsted (United States) A Ganesan	4	6	[7]
(Australia) P Harper (United Kingdom) J Monday	6	5	[10]
(United States) B Kittay (United States) J Sheehy	4	7	[8]
(Canada) J Boulais (United States) M Krueger	7	7^{7}
4	(India) S Banthia (Mexico) H Hach Verdugo	5	6^{3}
(Venezuela) JJ Bianchi (United States) A Fenty	6	3	[10]
2	(Canada) C Harper (United Kingdom) D Stevenson	4	6	[8]

Semifinals
1	(Australia) R Hijikata (United States) M Kiger	6	6
(Australia) P Harper (United Kingdom) J Monday	4	2
(Canada) J Boulais (United States) M Krueger	3	6^{5}
(Venezuela) JJ Bianchi (United States) A Fenty	6	7^{7}

Final
1	(Australia) R Hijikata (United States) M Kiger	6	6
(Venezuela) JJ Bianchi (United States) A Fenty	4	4
