= 2026 Sioux Falls Challenger – Doubles =

Doubles
- 2026 Sioux Falls Challenger

Final
- Champions: (Netherlands) Jarno Jans (Belgium) Joran Vliegen
- Runners-up: (Mexico) Miguel Ángel Reyes-Varela (United States) Reese Stalder
- Score: 6–4, 7–6^{(9–7)}

Events
Singles	Doubles
- Sioux Falls Challenger

Rinky Hijikata and Mac Kiger were the defending champions but only Kiger chose to defend his title, partnering John-Patrick Smith. They lost in the first round to Jason Jung and Joshua Sheehy.

Jarno Jans and Joran Vliegen won the title after defeating Miguel Ángel Reyes-Varela and Reese Stalder 6–4, 7–6^{(9–7)} in the final.

== Seeds ==
1. (United States) Mac Kiger / (Australia) John-Patrick Smith (first round)
2. (Mexico) Miguel Ángel Reyes-Varela / (United States) Reese Stalder (final)
3. (United States) Trey Hilderbrand / (Romania) Bogdan Pavel (quarterfinals)
4. (Netherlands) Jarno Jans / (Belgium) Joran Vliegen (champions)

== Draw ==
Key

- Q = Qualifier
- WC = Wild card
- LL = Lucky loser
- Alt = Alternate
- ITF = ITF entry
- PR = Protected ranking
- SR = Special ranking
- SE = Special exempt
- JE = Junior exempt
- JR = Junior Accelerator Programme entrant
- CO = College Accelerator Programme entrant
- NG = Next Gen Accelerator Program entrant
- w/o = Walkover
- r = Retired
- d = Defaulted

First round
1	(United States) M Kiger (Australia) J-P Smith	6^{6}	4
(Chinese Taipei) J Jung (United States) J Sheehy	7^{8}	6
(Antigua and Barbuda) J Maginley (United States) K Poling	6^{12}	6	[9]
(United Kingdom) T Hands (United Kingdom) M Summers	7^{14}	3	[11]
4	(Netherlands) J Jans (Belgium) J Vliegen	6	6
WC	(United States) M Exsted (United States) C Woestendick	4	3
(Czech Republic) H Bartoň (Poland) M Kaśnikowski	3	6^{6}
(United States) D Milavsky (United States) B Shick	6	7^{8}
(Canada) A Galarneau (Mexico) H Hach Verdugo	6	6^{2}	[10]
(Republic of Ireland) C Barry (United Kingdom) B Jones	2	7^{7}	[3]
(Ecuador) A Andrade (Jordan) A Shelbayh	6	3	[11]
3	(United States) T Hilderbrand (Romania) B Pavel	4	6	[13]
(Venezuela) LD Martínez (India) J Nedunchezhiyan	7^{11}	6
WC	(United States) M Krueger (United States) C Papa	6^{9}	4
(Denmark) OB Poulsen (Sweden) Nikola Slavic	3	6	[7]
2	(Mexico) M Reyes-Varela (United States) R Stalder	6	3	[10]

Quarterfinals
(Chinese Taipei) J Jung (United States) J Sheehy	6	4	[7]
(United Kingdom) T Hands (United Kingdom) M Summers	4	6	[10]
4	(Netherlands) J Jans (Belgium) J Vliegen	7^{7}	6
(United States) D Milavsky (United States) B Shick	6^{4}	3
(Canada) A Galarneau (Mexico) H Hach Verdugo	6	7^{7}
3	(United States) T Hilderbrand (Romania) B Pavel	4	6^{3}
(Venezuela) LD Martínez (India) J Nedunchezhiyan	3	4
2	(Mexico) M Reyes-Varela (United States) R Stalder	6	6

Semifinals
(United Kingdom) T Hands (United Kingdom) M Summers	4	6^{3}
4	(Netherlands) J Jans (Belgium) J Vliegen	6	7^{7}
(Canada) A Galarneau (Mexico) H Hach Verdugo	3	4
2	(Mexico) M Reyes-Varela (United States) R Stalder	6	6

Final
4	(Netherlands) J Jans (Belgium) J Vliegen	6	7^{9}
2	(Mexico) M Reyes-Varela (United States) R Stalder	4	6^{7}
