= 2025 Sioux Falls Challenger – Singles =

Singles
- 2025 Sioux Falls Challenger

Final
- Champion: (United States) Patrick Kypson
- Runner-up: (United Kingdom) Johannus Monday
- Score: 6–7^{(2–7)}, 7–6^{(7–4)}, 7–5

Events
| Singles | Doubles |
- Sioux Falls Challenger

Borna Gojo was the defending champion but chose not to defend his title.

Patrick Kypson won the title after defeating Johannus Monday 6–7^{(2–7)}, 7–6^{(7–4)}, 7–5 in the final.

== Seeds ==
1. (Australia) Jordan Thompson (quarterfinals, retired)
2. (United States) Brandon Holt (first round, retired)
3. (Australia) Rinky Hijikata (quarterfinals)
4. (Canada) Liam Draxl (second round)
5. (United States) Patrick Kypson (champion)
6. (United States) Murphy Cassone (second round)
7. (United States) Michael Zheng (first round)
8. (United Kingdom) Jay Clarke (first round)

== Draw ==
Key

- Q = Qualifier
- WC = Wild card
- LL = Lucky loser
- Alt = Alternate
- ITF = ITF entry
- PR = Protected ranking
- SR = Special ranking
- SE = Special exempt
- JE = Junior exempt
- JR = Junior Accelerator Programme entrant
- CO = College Accelerator Programme entrant
- NG = Next Gen Accelerator Program entrant
- w/o = Walkover
- r = Retired
- d = Defaulted

=== Finals ===
Semifinals
(Germany) Mats Rosenkranz | 4 | 6^{4}
(United Kingdom) Johannus Monday | 6 | 7^{7}
5 | (United States) Patrick Kypson | 6 | 6
Q | (France) Antoine Ghibaudo | 3 | 1

Final
(United Kingdom) Johannus Monday | 7^{7} | 6^{4} | 5
5 | (United States) Patrick Kypson | 6^{2} | 7^{7} | 7

=== Top half ===
First round
1 | (Australia) J Thompson | 6 | 6
(United States) M Mmoh | 3 | 4
(Germany) P Zahraj | 1 | 2
Q | E Arutiunian | 6 | 6
Q | (Canada) J Boulais | 1 | 4
(Germany) M Rosenkranz | 6 | 6
(United States) M Krueger | 6^{5} | 6 | 2
6 | (United States) M Cassone | 7^{7} | 3 | 6
4 | (Canada) L Draxl | 6 | 6
Alt | (United States) Dar Blanch | 4 | 4
(United States) A Martin | 7^{7} | 1 | 6
LL | (India) Aryan Shah | 6^{5} | 6 | 3
WC | (United States) C Kingsley | 4 | 4
Alt | (United States) A Perez | 6 | 6
(United Kingdom) J Monday | 2 | 6 | 6
7 | (United States) M Zheng | 6 | 4 | 4

Second round
1 | (Australia) J Thompson | 7 | 7^{7}
Q | E Arutiunian | 5 | 6^{2}
(Germany) M Rosenkranz | 6 | 7
6 | (United States) M Cassone | 0 | 5
4 | (Canada) L Draxl | 1 | 5
(United States) A Martin | 6 | 7
Alt | (United States) A Perez | 5 | 3
(United Kingdom) J Monday | 7 | 6

Quarterfinals
1 | (Australia) J Thompson | 5 | 0^{r}
(Germany) M Rosenkranz | 7 | 1
(United States) A Martin | 3 | 3
(United Kingdom) J Monday | 6 | 6

Semifinals
(Germany) M Rosenkranz | 4 | 6^{4}
(United Kingdom) J Monday | 6 | 7^{7}

=== Bottom half ===
First round
5 | (United States) P Kypson | 6 | 4 | 6
Alt | (United Kingdom) O Tarvet | 2 | 6 | 3
(Spain) R Jódar | 6 | 7
(Georgia (country)) S Purtseladze | 4 | 5
WC | (United States) S Banerjee | 6 | 6
Q | (United Kingdom) A McHugh | 3 | 4
(United Kingdom) J Pinnington Jones | 3 | 0
3 | (Australia) R Hijikata | 6 | 6
8 | (United Kingdom) J Clarke | 6 | 2 | 5
Q | (France) A Ghibaudo | 2 | 6 | 7
Q | (United States) A Fenty | 4 | 7^{7} | 7^{7}
Q | (United States) K Smith | 6 | 6^{4} | 6^{3}
LL | (Canada) D Martin | 2 | 4
(United States) M Damm | 6 | 6
WC | (United States) Andre Ilagan | 4
2 | (United States) B Holt | 3^{r}

Second round
5 | (United States) P Kypson | 6 | 6
(Spain) R Jódar | 4 | 4
WC | (United States) S Banerjee | 6^{3} | 2
3 | (Australia) R Hijikata | 7^{7} | 6
Q | (France) A Ghibaudo | 7 | 6
Q | (United States) A Fenty | 5 | 4
(United States) M Damm | 7^{7} | 7
WC | (United States) A Ilagan | 6^{2} | 5

Quarterfinals
5 | (United States) P Kypson | 6 | 6
3 | (Australia) R Hijikata | 4 | 4
Q | (France) A Ghibaudo | 7^{7} | 6
(United States) M Damm | 6^{4} | 4

Semifinals
5 | (United States) P Kypson | 6 | 6
Q | (France) A Ghibaudo | 3 | 1
