= 2023 Open Rionegro – Doubles =

Doubles
- 2023 Open Rionegro

Final
- Champions: (Colombia) Juan Sebastián Gómez (Colombia) Andrés Urrea
- Runners-up: (Brazil) Orlando Luz (Ukraine) Oleg Prihodko
- Score: 6–3, 7–6^{(12–10)}

Events
Singles	Doubles
- Open Rionegro

This was the first edition of the tournament.

Juan Sebastián Gómez and Andrés Urrea won the title after defeating Orlando Luz and Oleg Prihodko 6–3, 7–6^{(12–10)} in the final.

== Seeds ==
1. (Brazil) Orlando Luz / (Ukraine) Oleg Prihodko (final)
2. (Zimbabwe) Benjamin Lock / (New Zealand) Rubin Statham (first round)
3. (Australia) Calum Puttergill / (Canada) Kelsey Stevenson (semifinals)
4. (United States) Evan King / (United States) Vasil Kirkov (semifinals)

== Draw ==
Key

- Q = Qualifier
- WC = Wild card
- LL = Lucky loser
- Alt = Alternate
- ITF = ITF entry
- PR = Protected ranking
- SR = Special ranking
- SE = Special exempt
- JE = Junior exempt
- JR = Junior Accelerator Programme entrant
- CO = College Accelerator Programme entrant
- NG = Next Gen Accelerator Program entrant
- w/o = Walkover
- r = Retired
- d = Defaulted

First round
1	(Brazil) O Luz (Ukraine) O Prihodko	5	6	[10]
(United States) V Lilov (Peru) J Panta	7	3	[8]
WC	(Colombia) Alejandro Hoyos (Colombia) Miguel Tobón	3	6	[6]
(Colombia) N Mejía (Colombia) Johan Alexander Rodríguez	6	3	[10]
(Brazil) M Alves (Brazil) JVC Loureiro	7^{7}	6
(Brazil) P Boscardin Dias (Brazil) E Ribeiro	6^{4}	2
WC	(Colombia) Felipe Santamaría (Colombia) A Soriano Barrera	3	3
3	(Australia) C Puttergill (Canada) K Stevenson	6	6
Alt	(Colombia) Nicolás Buitrago (Colombia) Enrique Peña	4	6	[10]
(Colombia) JS Gómez (Colombia) A Urrea	6	3	[12]
(Argentina) MF Descotte (Argentina) S Rodríguez Taverna	6	6
2	(Zimbabwe) B Lock (New Zealand) R Statham	4	4

Quarterfinals
1	(Brazil) O Luz (Ukraine) O Prihodko	6	6
(Colombia) N Mejía (Colombia) JA Rodríguez	1	4
4	(United States) E King (United States) V Kirkov	4	6	[12]
(United States) G Goldhoff (Chile) M Soto	6	2	[10]
(Brazil) M Alves (Brazil) JVC Loureiro
3	(Australia) C Puttergill (Canada) K Stevenson	w/o
(Colombia) JS Gómez (Colombia) A Urrea	3	7	[10]
(Argentina) MF Descotte (Argentina) S Rodríguez Taverna	6	5	[5]

Semifinals
1	(Brazil) O Luz (Ukraine) O Prihodko	6^{4}	6	[10]
4	(United States) E King (United States) V Kirkov	7^{7}	3	[7]
3	(Australia) C Puttergill (Canada) K Stevenson	4	6^{4}
(Colombia) JS Gómez (Colombia) A Urrea	6	7^{7}

Final
1	(Brazil) O Luz (Ukraine) O Prihodko	3	6^{10}
(Colombia) JS Gómez (Colombia) A Urrea	6	7^{12}
