= 2026 Metepec Open – Singles =

Singles
- 2026 Metepec Open

Final
- Champion: (Croatia) Borna Gojo
- Runner-up: (Canada) Alexis Galarneau
- Score: 6–1, 6–4

Events
Singles	Doubles
- Metepec Open

This was the first edition of the tournament.

Borna Gojo won the title after defeating Alexis Galarneau 6–1, 6–4 in the final.

== Seeds ==
1. (Argentina) Juan Pablo Ficovich (quarterfinals)
2. (Australia) Bernard Tomic (quarterfinals)
3. (Mexico) Rodrigo Pacheco Méndez (semifinals)
4. (Canada) Alexis Galarneau (final)
5. (Croatia) Borna Gojo (champion)
6. (Ecuador) Andrés Andrade (semifinals)
7. (United States) Andres Martin (second round)
8. (United States) Stefan Kozlov (quarterfinals)

== Draw ==
Key

- Q = Qualifier
- WC = Wild card
- LL = Lucky loser
- Alt = Alternate
- ITF = ITF entry
- PR = Protected ranking
- SR = Special ranking
- SE = Special exempt
- JE = Junior exempt
- JR = Junior Accelerator Programme entrant
- CO = College Accelerator Programme entrant
- NG = Next Gen Accelerator Program entrant
- w/o = Walkover
- r = Retired
- d = Defaulted

=== Finals ===
Semifinals
6	(Ecuador) Andrés Andrade	7	5	4
4	(Canada) Alexis Galarneau	5	7	6
3	(Mexico) Rodrigo Pacheco Méndez	6^{5}	4
5	(Croatia) Borna Gojo	7^{7}	6

Final
4	(Canada) Alexis Galarneau	1	4
5	(Croatia) Borna Gojo	6	6

=== Top half ===
First round
1	(Argentina) JP Ficovich	6	6
Alt	(United States) Ryan Fishback	4	4
Q	(United States) Axel Nefve	7^{7}	6
WC	(Mexico) Alan Raúl Sau Franco	6^{3}	4
Q	(Brazil) Natan Rodrigues	6	4
(Colombia) Miguel Tobón	2	3^{r}
(Colombia) JS Gómez	2	3
6	(Ecuador) A Andrade	6	6
4	(Canada) A Galarneau	6	6
(Dominican Republic) N Hardt	3	0
(Morocco) T Baadi	3	0
Q	(United States) C Kingsley	6	6
(Australia) E Winter	6	7
Alt	(United States) Ryan Dickerson	2	5
(Canada) JC Aguilar	2	3
7	(United States) A Martin	6	6

Second round
1	(Argentina) JP Ficovich	6	6
Q	(United States) A Nefve	3	3
Q	(Brazil) N Rodrigues	4	4
6	(Ecuador) A Andrade	6	6
4	(Canada) A Galarneau	6	3	6
Q	(United States) C Kingsley	4	6	3
(Australia) E Winter	6	3	6
7	(United States) A Martin	2	6	3

Quarterfinals
1	(Argentina) JP Ficovich	6	5	6^{4}
6	(Ecuador) A Andrade	1	7	7^{7}
4	(Canada) A Galarneau	5	7	7
(Australia) E Winter	7	5	5

Semifinals
6	(Ecuador) A Andrade	7	5	4
4	(Canada) A Galarneau	5	7	6

=== Bottom half ===
First round
8	(United States) S Kozlov	6	6^{4}	6
(United States) Tristan McCormick	3	7^{7}	4
(Jamaica) B Bicknell	6	5	1
(United States) K Poling	4	7	6
(Canada) D Martin	5	0^{r}
Q	(United States) A Ayeni	7	0
Q	(France) Guillaume Dalmasso	2	1
3	(Mexico) R Pacheco Méndez	6	6
5	(Croatia) B Gojo	6^{7}	6	7^{7}
(Argentina) F Mena	7^{9}	4	6^{5}
Q	(United Kingdom) B Jones	6	7^{11}
WC	(Mexico) Rafael de Alba	1	6^{9}
PR	(Netherlands) G Brouwer	6	6
(Romania) Sebastian Gima	2	3
WC	(Mexico) AF Rubio Fierros	6^{6}	3
2	(Australia) B Tomic	7^{8}	6

Second round
8	(United States) S Kozlov	6	7^{7}
(United States) K Poling	4	6^{4}
Q	(United States) A Ayeni	6	1	4
3	(Mexico) R Pacheco Méndez	3	6	6
5	(Croatia) B Gojo	6	4
Q	(United Kingdom) B Jones	3	2^{r}
PR	(Netherlands) G Brouwer	6	3	2
2	(Australia) B Tomic	4	6	6

Quarterfinals
8	(United States) S Kozlov	4	2
3	(Mexico) R Pacheco Méndez	6	6
5	(Croatia) B Gojo	6	4	6
2	(Australia) B Tomic	3	6	4

Semifinals
3	(Mexico) R Pacheco Méndez	6^{5}	4
5	(Croatia) B Gojo	7^{7}	6
