= 2022 Bengaluru Open – Singles =

Singles
- 2022 Bengaluru Open

Final
- Champion: (Chinese Taipei) Tseng Chun-hsin
- Runner-up: (Croatia) Borna Gojo
- Score: 6–4, 7–5

Events
Singles	Doubles
← 2020 ·	Bengaluru Open	· 2022 →

James Duckworth was the defending champion but chose not to defend his title.

Tseng Chun-hsin won the title after defeating Borna Gojo 6–4, 7–5 in the final.

== Seeds ==
1. (Czech Republic) Jiří Veselý (quarterfinals, retired)
2. (Italy) Stefano Travaglia (first round)
3. (Australia) Aleksandar Vukic (second round)
4. (France) Hugo Grenier (second round)
5. (Turkey) Altuğ Çelikbilek (second round)
6. (France) Enzo Couacaud (semifinals)
7. (Sweden) Elias Ymer (withdrew)
8. (Italy) Federico Gaio (first round)

== Draw ==
=== Key ===
- Q = Qualifier
- WC = Wild card
- LL = Lucky loser
- Alt = Alternate
- SE = Special exempt
- PR = Protected ranking
- ITF = ITF entry
- JE = Junior exempt
- w/o = Walkover
- r = Retired
- d = Defaulted
- SR = Special ranking

=== Finals ===
Semifinals
6	(France) Enzo Couacaud	5	4
(Chinese Taipei) Tseng Chun-hsin	7	6
Q	(Croatia) Borna Gojo	4	6	6
(France) Alexandre Müller	6	3	0

Final
(Chinese Taipei) Tseng Chun-hsin	6	7
Q	(Croatia) Borna Gojo	4	5

=== Top half ===
First round
1	(Czech Republic) J Veselý	6	6^{2}	6
Q	(Switzerland) A Bellier	3	7^{7}	2
(France) M Bourgue	6^{4}	2
(India) P Gunneswaran	7^{7}	6
(India) R Ramanathan	6	0	5
(Australia) M Purcell	3	6	7
WC	(India) Rishi Reddy	1	3
6	(France) E Couacaud	6	6
4	(France) H Grenier	6	2	6
(Czech Republic) V Kopřiva	1	6	4
(United Kingdom) J Clarke	3	1
(Chinese Taipei) C-h Tseng	6	6
(Italy) GM Moroni	6	6
WC	(India) S Myneni	1	1
Q	(Brazil) G Décamps	6	6
8	(Italy) F Gaio	3	3

Second round
1	(Czech Republic) J Veselý	3	6	6
(India) P Gunneswaran	6	2	1
(Australia) M Purcell	4	6	2
6	(France) E Couacaud	6	3	6
4	(France) H Grenier	1	4
(Chinese Taipei) C-h Tseng	6	6
(Italy) GM Moroni	2	7	6^{3}
Q	(Brazil) G Décamps	6	5	7^{7}

Quarterfinals
1	(Czech Republic) J Veselý	4	0^{r}
6	(France) E Couacaud	6	0
(Chinese Taipei) C-h Tseng	6	6
Q	(Brazil) G Décamps	4	4

Semifinals
6	(France) E Couacaud	5	4
(Chinese Taipei) C-h Tseng	7	6

=== Bottom half ===
First round
5	(Turkey) A Çelikbilek	6	6
Q	(India) A Kadhe	1	2
(Australia) M Polmans	6	2	4
(Belgium) K Coppejans	1	6	6
Q	(Croatia) B Gojo	3	6	6
Q	(Japan) R Noguchi	6	1	2
(Australia) J Kubler	5	4
3	(Australia) A Vukic	7	6
LL	(Canada) S Diez	2	3
(Turkey) C İlkel	6	6
Q	(Tunisia) M Jaziri	6^{10}	4
(Russia) E Donskoy	7^{12}	6
WC	(India) SDP Dev	2	2
(Bulgaria) D Kuzmanov	6	6
(France) A Müller	6	7^{7}
2	(Italy) S Travaglia	1	6^{2}

Second round
5	(Turkey) A Çelikbilek	6^{12}	3
(Belgium) K Coppejans	7^{14}	6
Q	(Croatia) B Gojo	7	6
3	(Australia) A Vukic	5	3
(Turkey) C İlkel	2	6	7
(Russia) E Donskoy	6	3	5
(Bulgaria) D Kuzmanov	6^{4}	4
(France) A Müller	7^{7}	6

Quarterfinals
(Belgium) K Coppejans	5	4
Q	(Croatia) B Gojo	7	6
(Turkey) C İlkel	4	6^{7}
(France) A Müller	6	7^{9}

Semifinals
Q	(Croatia) B Gojo	4	6	6
(France) A Müller	6	3	0
