= 2026 Baton Rouge Challenger – Doubles =

Doubles
- 2026 Baton Rouge Challenger

Final
- Champions: (United States) Alafia Ayeni (United States) Keegan Smith
- Runners-up: (United States) Ronald Hohmann (United States) Andres Martin
- Score: 5–7, 6–3, [10–7]

Events
Singles	Doubles
- Baton Rouge Challenger

This was the first edition of the tournament.

Alafia Ayeni and Keegan Smith won the title after defeating Ronald Hohmann and Andres Martin 5–7, 6–3, [10–7] in the final.

== Seeds ==
1. (United States) George Goldhoff / (Australia) Calum Puttergill (quarterfinals)
2. (Venezuela) Juan José Bianchi / (United States) Daniel Milavsky (first round)
3. (United Kingdom) Scott Duncan / (United Kingdom) James MacKinlay (first round)
4. (United Kingdom) Finn Bass / (United Kingdom) Ben Jones (semifinals)

== Draw ==
Key

- Q = Qualifier
- WC = Wild card
- LL = Lucky loser
- Alt = Alternate
- ITF = ITF entry
- PR = Protected ranking
- SR = Special ranking
- SE = Special exempt
- JE = Junior exempt
- JR = Junior Accelerator Programme entrant
- CO = College Accelerator Programme entrant
- NG = Next Gen Accelerator Program entrant
- w/o = Walkover
- r = Retired
- d = Defaulted

First round
1	(United States) G Goldhoff (Australia) C Puttergill	6	6
WC	(United States) Felix Corwin (United States) Matt Kuhar	2	2
WC	(United States) Ronald Hohmann (United States) A Martin	6	6
(Venezuela) B Pérez (United States) K Poling	3	3
4	(United Kingdom) F Bass (United Kingdom) B Jones	7	6
(Bolivia) B Arias (United States) N Schachter	5	1
(United States) Zachary Fuchs (United States) Jamie Vance	6	7^{7}
(United States) Ryan Dickerson (United States) Tristan McCormick	3	6^{3}
(United States) C Kingsley (Antigua and Barbuda) J Maginley	4	7^{7}	[10]
(Republic of Ireland) C Barry (United States) B Shick	6	6^{5}	[6]
(United States) A Ayeni (United States) K Smith	7^{7}	4	[10]
3	(United Kingdom) S Duncan (United Kingdom) J MacKinlay	6^{5}	6	[6]
(Ecuador) A Andrade (United States) T Zink	6	6
(Argentina) Valentín Basel (Argentina) F Ribero	4	3
(United Kingdom) James Hopper (United States) P Kumar	3	7^{11}	[10]
2	(Venezuela) Juan José Bianchi (United States) D Milavsky	6	6^{9}	[7]

Quarterfinals
1	(United States) G Goldhoff (Australia) C Puttergill	2	5
WC	(United States) R Hohmann (United States) A Martin	6	7
4	(United Kingdom) F Bass (United Kingdom) B Jones	6	4	[10]
(United States) Z Fuchs (United States) Jam Vance	2	6	[5]
(United States) C Kingsley (Antigua and Barbuda) J Maginley	5	3
(United States) A Ayeni (United States) K Smith	7	6
(Ecuador) A Andrade (United States) T Zink	7^{7}	7^{7}
(United Kingdom) J Hopper (United States) P Kumar	6^{3}	6^{4}

Semifinals
WC	(United States) R Hohmann (United States) A Martin	7^{7}	7^{7}
4	(United Kingdom) F Bass (United Kingdom) B Jones	6^{4}	6^{3}
(United States) A Ayeni (United States) K Smith	6	5	[10]
(Ecuador) A Andrade (United States) T Zink	3	7	[5]

Final
WC	(United States) R Hohmann (United States) A Martin	7	3	[7]
(United States) A Ayeni (United States) K Smith	5	6	[10]
