= 2023 Open Rionegro – Singles =

Singles
- 2023 Open Rionegro

Final
- Champion: (United States) Patrick Kypson
- Runner-up: (Zimbabwe) Benjamin Lock
- Score: 6–3, 6–3

Events
Singles	Doubles
Open Rionegro	· 2024 →

This was the first edition of the tournament.

Patrick Kypson won the title after defeating Benjamin Lock 6–3, 6–3 in the final.

== Seeds ==
1. (Colombia) Nicolás Mejía (quarterfinals)
2. (Argentina) Santiago Rodríguez Taverna (quarterfinals)
3. (Argentina) Federico Delbonis (first round)
4. (Brazil) João Lucas Reis da Silva (first round)
5. (Argentina) Guido Andreozzi (first round)
6. (Croatia) Nino Serdarušić (quarterfinals)
7. (United States) Patrick Kypson (champion)
8. (Australia) Tristan Schoolkate (first round)

== Draw ==
=== Key ===
- Q = Qualifier
- WC = Wild card
- LL = Lucky loser
- Alt = Alternate
- ITF = ITF entry
- PR = Protected ranking
- SR = Special ranking
- SE = Special exempt
- JE = Junior exempt
- JR = Junior Accelerator Programme entrant
- CO = College Accelerator Programme entrant
- NG = Next Gen Accelerator Program entrant
- w/o = Walkover
- r = Retired
- d = Defaulted

=== Finals ===
Semifinals
(Colombia) Adrià Soriano Barrera	4	4
(Zimbabwe) Benjamin Lock	6	6
7	(United States) Patrick Kypson	6	7^{7}
(Brazil) Eduardo Ribeiro	4	6^{4}

Final
(Zimbabwe) Benjamin Lock	3	3
7	(United States) Patrick Kypson	6	6

=== Top half ===
First round
1/WC	(Colombia) N Mejía	6	7^{7}
(Brazil) P Boscardin Dias	2	6^{3}
Q	(Australia) C Puttergill	6	7^{7}
LL	(Argentina) Ignacio Monzón	3	6^{3}
(Colombia) A Soriano Barrera	7^{7}	6
Q	(Brazil) Nicolas Zanellato	6^{3}	2
Q	(United States) Tristan McCormick	6^{3}	6	7^{7}
5	(Argentina) G Andreozzi	7^{7}	1	6^{5}
4	(Brazil) JL Reis da Silva	3	1
(Zimbabwe) B Lock	6	6
WC	(Colombia) Felipe Santamaría	4	4
(Brazil) M Alves	6	6
(Peru) J Panta	6	6
PR	(Brazil) P Sakamoto	4	2
Q	(Colombia) JS Gómez	3	4
6	(Croatia) N Serdarušić	6	6

Second round
1/WC	(Colombia) N Mejía	6	6
Q	(Australia) C Puttergill	4	3
(Colombia) A Soriano Barrera	7^{7}	6^{4}	7^{7}
Q	(United States) T McCormick	6^{5}	7^{7}	6^{5}
(Zimbabwe) B Lock	7^{7}	4	6
(Brazil) M Alves	6^{5}	6	1
(Peru) J Panta	5	4
6	(Croatia) N Serdarušić	7	6

Quarterfinals
1/WC	(Colombia) N Mejía	6	6^{5}	2
(Colombia) A Soriano Barrera	1	7^{7}	6
(Zimbabwe) B Lock	6	6
6	(Croatia) N Serdarušić	4	4

Semifinals
(Colombia) A Soriano Barrera	4	4
(Zimbabwe) B Lock	6	6

=== Bottom half ===
First round
7	(United States) P Kypson	6	6
(Argentina) MF Descotte	4	3
(Argentina) A Barrena	7^{7}	4	4
(Chile) G Lama	6^{3}	6	6
(Germany) MH Rehberg	6^{5}	6	1
Q	(Chile) M Soto	7^{7}	1	6
(Brazil) G Heide	7	6
3	(Argentina) F Delbonis	5	4
8	(Australia) T Schoolkate	2	6^{4}
(Brazil) E Ribeiro	6	7^{7}
(Austria) G Melzer	1	6	7^{7}
PR	(New Zealand) R Statham	6	4	6^{0}
(Brazil) O Luz	6	6
WC	(Colombia) Johan Alexander Rodríguez	3	3
Q	(United States) A Mayo	6^{5}	3
2	(Argentina) S Rodríguez Taverna	7^{7}	6

Second round
7	(United States) P Kypson	7^{9}	6
(Chile) G Lama	6^{7}	1
Q	(Chile) M Soto	6	3	6
(Brazil) G Heide	3	6	1
(Brazil) E Ribeiro	6	6
(Austria) G Melzer	3	4
(Brazil) O Luz	6^{3}	3
2	(Argentina) S Rodríguez Taverna	7^{7}	6

Quarterfinals
7	(United States) P Kypson	6	6
Q	(Chile) M Soto	3	2
(Brazil) E Ribeiro	6	4	6
2	(Argentina) S Rodríguez Taverna	3	6	2

Semifinals
7	(United States) P Kypson	6	7^{7}
(Brazil) E Ribeiro	4	6^{4}
