= 2024 Sioux Falls Challenger =

- Date: 21 – 27 October
- Edition: 1st
- Surface: Hard (indoor)
- Location: Sioux Falls, South Dakota, United States

Champions

Singles
- (Croatia) Borna Gojo

Doubles
- (Canada) Liam Draxl / (Canada) Cleeve Harper
- Sioux Falls Challenger

The 2024 MarketBeat Open was a professional tennis tournament played on indoor hardcourts. It was the first edition of the tournament which was part of the 2024 ATP Challenger Tour. It took place in Sioux Falls, South Dakota, United States between 21 and 27 October 2024.

== Singles main draw entrants ==
=== Seeds ===
Country	Player	Rank^{1}	Seed
USA	Christopher Eubanks	120	1
USA	Mitchell Krueger	149	2
USA	Zachary Svajda	163	3
POL	Maks Kaśnikowski	171	4
KAZ	Dmitry Popko	173	5
USA	Patrick Kypson	177	6
USA	Nishesh Basavareddy	195	7
USA	Brandon Holt	196	8

- ^{1} Rankings are as of 14 October 2024.

=== Other entrants ===
The following players received wildcards into the singles main draw:

- (United Kingdom) Kyle Edmund
- (United States) Matthew Forbes
- (United States) Colton Smith

The following players received entry into the singles main draw as special exempts:

- (United States) Murphy Cassone
- (United States) Govind Nanda

The following player received entry into the singles main draw using a protected ranking:

- (United Kingdom) Alastair Gray

The following player received entry into the singles main draw as an alternate:

- (Slovenia) Bor Artnak

The following players received entry from the qualifying draw:

- Martin Borisiouk
- (France) Antoine Ghibaudo
- (Croatia) Borna Gojo
- (United States) Andres Martin
- (United States) Keegan Smith
- (United States) Cooper Woestendick

The following player received entry as a lucky loser:

- (United States) Omni Kumar

== Champions ==
=== Singles ===
- (Croatia) Borna Gojo def. (United States) Colton Smith 6–1, 7–5.

=== Doubles ===
- (Canada) Liam Draxl / (Canada) Cleeve Harper def. (United States) Ryan Seggerman / (United States) Patrik Trhac 7–5, 6–3.
