= 2024 Sioux Falls Challenger – Doubles =

Doubles
- 2024 Sioux Falls Challenger

Final
- Champions: (Canada) Liam Draxl (Canada) Cleeve Harper
- Runners-up: (United States) Ryan Seggerman (United States) Patrik Trhac
- Score: 7–5, 6–3

Events
Singles	Doubles
- Sioux Falls Challenger

This was the first edition of the tournament.

Liam Draxl and Cleeve Harper won the title after defeating Ryan Seggerman and Patrik Trhac 7–5, 6–3 in the final.

== Seeds ==
1. (United States) Ryan Seggerman / (United States) Patrik Trhac (final)
2. (Mexico) Hans Hach Verdugo / (Poland) Szymon Walków (semifinals)
3. (Canada) Liam Draxl / (Canada) Cleeve Harper (champions)
4. (Australia) Patrick Harper / (Canada) Benjamin Sigouin (first round)

== Draw ==
Key

- Q = Qualifier
- WC = Wild card
- LL = Lucky loser
- Alt = Alternate
- ITF = ITF entry
- PR = Protected ranking
- SR = Special ranking
- SE = Special exempt
- JE = Junior exempt
- JR = Junior Accelerator Programme entrant
- CO = College Accelerator Programme entrant
- NG = Next Gen Accelerator Program entrant
- w/o = Walkover
- r = Retired
- d = Defaulted

=== Draw ===
First round
1	(United States) R Seggerman (United States) P Trhac	6	6
(United States) B Holt (United States) Z Svajda	3	4
(United States) M Damm (United States) M Krueger	7^{7}	7^{7}
(Zimbabwe) CJ Lock (Germany) M Wiskandt	6^{2}	6^{4}
4	(Australia) P Harper (Canada) B Sigouin	4	2
(United States) A Lawson (United States) E Quinn	6	6
(Germany) T Handel (United States) Andre Ilagan	6	6
(France) E Couacaud (Kazakhstan) D Popko	3	3
WC	(United States) M Exsted (United States) C Woestendick	5	4
WC	(United States) A Martin (United States) K Smith	7	6
(United States) P Kumar (United States) N Schachter	6	6^{6}	[8]
3	(Canada) L Draxl (Canada) C Harper	2	7^{8}	[10]
(United States) P Kypson (United States) E Spizzirri	6	6
(Israel) R Stepanov (Canada) K Stevenson	4	2
(United States) Lucas Horve (Antigua and Barbuda) J Maginley	6	5	[7]
2	(Mexico) H Hach Verdugo (Poland) S Walków	4	7	[10]

Quarterfinals
1	(United States) R Seggerman (United States) P Trhac	6	7^{7}
(United States) M Damm (United States) M Krueger	2	6^{0}
(United States) A Lawson (United States) E Quinn	6^{5}	7	[10]
(Germany) T Handel (United States) A Ilagan	7^{7}	5	[6]
WC	(United States) A Martin (United States) K Smith	6	4	[3]
3	(Canada) L Draxl (Canada) C Harper	4	6	[10]
(United States) P Kypson (United States) E Spizzirri
2	(Mexico) H Hach Verdugo (Poland) S Walków	w/o

Semifinals
1	(United States) R Seggerman (United States) P Trhac	7^{7}	6
(United States) A Lawson (United States) E Quinn	6^{3}	1
3	(Canada) L Draxl (Canada) C Harper	6	3	[10]
2	(Mexico) H Hach Verdugo (Poland) S Walków	4	6	[8]

Final
1	(United States) R Seggerman (United States) P Trhac	5	3
3	(Canada) L Draxl (Canada) C Harper	7	6
