= 2026 Baton Rouge Challenger – Singles =

Singles
- 2026 Baton Rouge Challenger

Final
- Champion: (United States) Stefan Dostanic
- Runner-up: (Canada) Alexis Galarneau
- Score: 6–4, 6–1

Events
Singles	Doubles
- Baton Rouge Challenger

This was the first edition of the tournament.

Stefan Dostanic won the title after defeating Alexis Galarneau 6–4, 6–1 in the final.

== Seeds ==
1. (Canada) Alexis Galarneau (final)
2. (Ecuador) Andrés Andrade (semifinals)
3. (United States) Andres Martin (first round)
4. (United States) Stefan Kozlov (withdrew)
5. (United States) Garrett Johns (first round)
6. (Germany) Cedrik-Marcel Stebe (withdrew)
7. (United States) Tyler Zink (second round)
8. (United States) Keegan Smith (first round)

== Draw ==
Key

- Q = Qualifier
- WC = Wild card
- LL = Lucky loser
- Alt = Alternate
- ITF = ITF entry
- PR = Protected ranking
- SR = Special ranking
- SE = Special exempt
- JE = Junior exempt
- JR = Junior Accelerator Programme entrant
- CO = College Accelerator Programme entrant
- NG = Next Gen Accelerator Program entrant
- w/o = Walkover
- r = Retired
- d = Defaulted

=== Finals ===
Semifinals
1	(Canada) Alexis Galarneau	6	6
(United States) Andre Ilagan	3	2
Q	(United States) Stefan Dostanic	4	6	7
2	(Ecuador) Andrés Andrade	6	2	5

Final
1	(Canada) Alexis Galarneau	4	1
Q	(United States) Stefan Dostanic	6	6

=== Top half ===
First round
1	(Canada) A Galarneau	7	6
Q	(Latvia) K Ozoliņš	5	3
(France) A Ghibaudo	4	4
JR	(United States) J Kennedy	6	6
(France) Raphael Perot	4	6	7
Q	(United States) Felix Corwin	6	2	5
(United States) D Milavsky	6	7
8	(United States) K Smith	3	5
3	(United States) A Martin	3	5
(United States) C Kingsley	6	7
E Arutiunian	6	6
LL	(United Kingdom) B Jones	4	4
(United States) Andre Ilagan	6	7^{7}
(Romania) Sebastian Gima	2	6^{0}
(United States) Christian Langmo	7	6
5	(United States) G Johns	5	3

Second round
1	(Canada) A Galarneau	6	6
JR	(United States) J Kennedy	4	3
(France) R Perot	5	6	1
(United States) D Milavsky	7	1	6
(United States) C Kingsley	6	7
E Arutiunian	2	5
(United States) A Ilagan	7	6
(United States) C Langmo	5	2

Quarterfinals
1	(Canada) A Galarneau	6	6
(United States) D Milavsky	4	4
(United States) C Kingsley	2	4
(United States) A Ilagan	6	6

Semifinals
1	(Canada) A Galarneau	6	6
(United States) A Ilagan	3	2

=== Bottom half ===
First round
Q	(United States) N Schachter	0	0
(Poland) Olaf Pieczkowski	6	6
WC	(United States) Q Vandecasteele	6	7^{7}
WC	(United States) M Forbes	4	6^{3}
(United States) Tristan McCormick	6^{6}	4
(Latvia) R Strombachs	7^{8}	6
Q	(United States) S Dostanic	6	6
LL	(Canada) Benjamin Thomas George	2	4
7	(United States) T Zink	6	6
Alt	(Turkey) A Azkara	4	1
Q	(United States) Ryan Fishback	6	6^{5}	2
WC	(United States) B Shick	4	7^{7}	6
Alt	(Canada) J Boulais	6	2	1
(Jamaica) B Bicknell	3	6	6
Q	(France) Andrej Loncarevic	0	2
2	(Ecuador) A Andrade	6	6

Second round
(Poland) O Pieczkowski	6	7^{7}
WC	(United States) Q Vandecasteele	3	6^{4}
(Latvia) R Strombachs	3	3
Q	(United States) S Dostanic	6	6
7	(United States) T Zink	6^{7}	4
WC	(United States) B Shick	7^{9}	6
(Jamaica) B Bicknell	1	3
2	(Ecuador) A Andrade	6	6

Quarterfinals
(Poland) O Pieczkowski	6^{4}	1
Q	(United States) S Dostanic	7^{7}	6
WC	(United States) B Shick
2	(Ecuador) A Andrade	w/o

Semifinals
Q	(United States) S Dostanic	4	6	7
2	(Ecuador) A Andrade	6	2	5
