= 2022 Bengaluru Open – Doubles =

Doubles
- 2022 Bengaluru Open

Final
- Champions: (India) Saketh Myneni (India) Ramkumar Ramanathan
- Runners-up: (France) Hugo Grenier (France) Alexandre Müller
- Score: 6–3, 6–2

Events
Singles	Doubles
- Bengaluru Open

Purav Raja and Ramkumar Ramanathan were the defending champions but chose to defend their title with different partners. Raja partnered Jeevan Nedunchezhiyan but lost in the quarterfinals to Jay Clarke and Marc Polmans. Ramanathan partnered Saketh Myneni and successfully defended his title, defeating Hugo Grenier and Alexandre Müller 6–3, 6–2 in the final.

== Seeds ==
1. (India) Jeevan Nedunchezhiyan / (India) Purav Raja (quarterfinals)
2. (Austria) Alexander Erler / (Czech Republic) Vít Kopřiva (semifinals)
3. (India) Saketh Myneni / (India) Ramkumar Ramanathan (champions)
4. (India) Sriram Balaji / (India) Vishnu Vardhan (quarterfinals)

== Draw ==
Key

- Q = Qualifier
- WC = Wild card
- LL = Lucky loser
- Alt = Alternate
- ITF = ITF entry
- PR = Protected ranking
- SR = Special ranking
- SE = Special exempt
- JE = Junior exempt
- JR = Junior Accelerator Programme entrant
- CO = College Accelerator Programme entrant
- NG = Next Gen Accelerator Program entrant
- w/o = Walkover
- r = Retired
- d = Defaulted

First round
1	(India) J Nedunchezhiyan (India) P Raja	6	6^{2}	[10]
Alt	(Croatia) B Gojo (Bulgaria) D Kuzmanov	4	7^{7}	[8]
(India) A Kadhe (Chinese Taipei) C-h Tseng	6	4	[7]
(United Kingdom) J Clarke (Australia) M Polmans	2	6	[10]
3	(India) S Myneni (India) R Ramanathan	6	6
PR	(Greece) M Kalovelonis (Japan) T Matsui	3	3
(Canada) S Diez (Tunisia) M Jaziri	5	6	[10]
Alt	(Italy) R Brancaccio (Switzerland) J Nikles	7	4	[6]
(France) E Couacaud (Australia) A Harris	2	6	[9]
(France) H Grenier (France) A Müller	6	4	[11]
(France) M Bourgue (Belgium) K Coppejans	6	4	[3]
4	(India) S Balaji (India) V Vardhan	4	6	[10]
(Turkey) A Çelikbilek (Turkey) C İlkel	1^{r}
WC	(India) Y Bhambri (India) D Sharan	3
WC	(India) A Kalyanpur (India) M Sasikumar	4	5
2	(Austria) A Erler (Czech Republic) V Kopřiva	6	7

Quarterfinals
1	(India) J Nedunchezhiyan (India) P Raja	2	1
(United Kingdom) J Clarke (Australia) M Polmans	6	6
3	(India) S Myneni (India) R Ramanathan	w/o
(Canada) S Diez (Tunisia) M Jaziri
(France) H Grenier (France) A Müller	6	6^{2}	[10]
4	(India) S Balaji (India) V Vardhan	4	7^{7}	[4]
WC	(India) Y Bhambri (India) D Sharan	4	3
2	(Austria) A Erler (Czech Republic) V Kopřiva	6	6

Semifinals
(United Kingdom) J Clarke (Australia) M Polmans	4	4
3	(India) S Myneni (India) R Ramanathan	6	6
(France) H Grenier (France) A Müller	6	6
2	(Austria) A Erler (Czech Republic) V Kopřiva	3	4

Final
3	(India) S Myneni (India) R Ramanathan	6	6
(France) H Grenier (France) A Müller	3	2
