= 2026 Metepec Open – Doubles =

Doubles
- 2026 Metepec Open

Final
- Champions: (United States) Pranav Kumar (United States) Karl Poling
- Runners-up: (United Kingdom) Scott Duncan (United Kingdom) Ben Jones
- Score: 6–2, 6–3

Events
Singles	Doubles
- Metepec Open

This was the first edition of the tournament.

Pranav Kumar and Karl Poling won the title after defeating Scott Duncan and Ben Jones 6–2, 6–3 in the final.

== Seeds ==
1. (Ecuador) Diego Hidalgo / (United States) Patrik Trhac (quarterfinals)
2. (India) Arjun Kadhe / (Japan) Takeru Yuzuki (quarterfinals)
3. (United States) George Goldhoff / (Australia) Calum Puttergill (semifinals)
4. (United Kingdom) Scott Duncan / (United Kingdom) Ben Jones (final)

== Draw ==
Key

- Q = Qualifier
- WC = Wild card
- LL = Lucky loser
- Alt = Alternate
- ITF = ITF entry
- PR = Protected ranking
- SR = Special ranking
- SE = Special exempt
- JE = Junior exempt
- JR = Junior Accelerator Programme entrant
- CO = College Accelerator Programme entrant
- NG = Next Gen Accelerator Program entrant
- w/o = Walkover
- r = Retired
- d = Defaulted

First round
1	(Ecuador) D Hidalgo (United States) P Trhac	6	6^{4}	[17]
(United States) Zachary Fuchs (United Kingdom) James Hopper	3	7^{7}	[15]
WC	(Mexico) Rafael de Alba (Mexico) Alan Raúl Sau Franco	3	4
(Republic of Ireland) C Barry (United States) A Martin	6	6
4	(United Kingdom) S Duncan (United Kingdom) B Jones	6	6
(United States) Ryan Dickerson (Romania) Sebastian Gima	4	3
WC	(Mexico) Emiliano Aguilera (Mexico) José Luis Alcocer	2	3
(Ecuador) A Andrade (Argentina) F Mena	6	6
(Morocco) T Baadi (United States) J Sheehy	0	6^{4}
(United States) A Ayeni (Canada) D Martin	6	7^{7}
(United States) Tristan McCormick (Venezuela) B Pérez	4	4
3	(United States) G Goldhoff (Australia) C Puttergill	6	6
(United States) P Kumar (United States) K Poling	6^{2}	6	[10]
(Canada) JC Aguilar (United States) N Schachter	7^{7}	3	[5]
(Venezuela) Juan José Bianchi (United States) C Kingsley	6^{5}	6^{3}
2	(India) A Kadhe (Japan) T Yuzuki	7^{7}	7^{7}

Quarterfinals
1	(Ecuador) D Hidalgo (United States) P Trhac	6^{2}	6^{5}
(Republic of Ireland) C Barry (United States) A Martin	7^{7}	7^{7}
4	(United Kingdom) S Duncan (United Kingdom) B Jones	6	7^{7}
(Ecuador) A Andrade (Argentina) F Mena	1	6^{1}
(United States) A Ayeni (Canada) D Martin
3	(United States) G Goldhoff (Australia) C Puttergill	w/o
(United States) P Kumar (United States) K Poling	3	7^{7}	[10]
2	(India) A Kadhe (Japan) T Yuzuki	6	6^{2}	[7]

Semifinals
(Republic of Ireland) C Barry (United States) A Martin	1	4
4	(United Kingdom) S Duncan (United Kingdom) B Jones	6	6
3	(United States) G Goldhoff (Australia) C Puttergill	6^{5}	6	[5]
(United States) P Kumar (United States) K Poling	7^{7}	1	[10]

Final
4	(United Kingdom) S Duncan (United Kingdom) B Jones	2	3
(United States) P Kumar (United States) K Poling	6	6
