= 2025 Sioux Falls Challenger =

- Date: 20 – 26 October
- Edition: 2nd
- Surface: Hard (indoor)
- Location: Sioux Falls, South Dakota, United States

Champions

Singles
- (United States) Patrick Kypson

Doubles
- (Australia) Rinky Hijikata / (United States) Mac Kiger
- Sioux Falls Challenger

The 2025 MarketBeat Open was a professional tennis tournament played on indoor hardcourts. It was the second edition of the tournament which was part of the 2025 ATP Challenger Tour. It took place in Sioux Falls, South Dakota, United States between 20 and 26 October 2025.

== Singles main draw entrants ==
=== Seeds ===
Country	Player	Rank^{1}	Seed
AUS	Jordan Thompson	80	1
USA	Brandon Holt	112	2
AUS	Rinky Hijikata	114	3
CAN	Liam Draxl	118	4
USA	Patrick Kypson	169	5
USA	Murphy Cassone	178	6
USA	Michael Zheng	180	7
GBR	Jay Clarke	189	8

- ^{1} Rankings are as of 13 October 2025.

=== Other entrants ===
The following players received wildcards into the singles main draw:

- (United States) Samir Banerjee
- (United States) Andre Ilagan
- (United States) Cannon Kingsley

The following players received entry into the singles main draw as alternates:

- (United States) Darwin Blanch
- (United States) Alfredo Perez
- (United Kingdom) Oliver Tarvet

The following players received entry from the qualifying draw:

- Erik Arutiunian
- (Canada) Justin Boulais
- (United States) Andrew Fenty
- (France) Antoine Ghibaudo
- (United Kingdom) Aidan McHugh
- (United States) Keegan Smith

The following players received entry as lucky losers:

- (Canada) Dan Martin
- (India) Aryan Shah

== Champions ==
=== Singles ===
- (United States) Patrick Kypson def. (United Kingdom) Johannus Monday 6–7^{(2–7)}, 7–6^{(7–4)}, 7–5.

=== Doubles ===
- (Australia) Rinky Hijikata / (United States) Mac Kiger def. (Venezuela) Juan José Bianchi / (United States) Andrew Fenty 6–4, 6–4.
