= 2020 Bengaluru Open – Singles =

Singles
- 2020 Bengaluru Open

Final
- Champion: (Australia) James Duckworth
- Runner-up: (France) Benjamin Bonzi
- Score: 6–4, 6–4

Events
Singles	Doubles
- Bengaluru Open

Prajnesh Gunneswaran was the defending champion but lost in the third round to Benjamin Bonzi.

James Duckworth won the title after defeating Bonzi 6–4, 6–4 in the final round.

== Seeds ==
All seeds receive a bye into the second round.

1. (Lithuania) Ričardas Berankis (withdrew)
2. (Italy) Stefano Travaglia (semifinals)
3. (Japan) Yūichi Sugita (quarterfinals)
4. (Australia) James Duckworth (champion)
5. (Czech Republic) Jiří Veselý (withdrew)
6. (Russia) Evgeny Donskoy (second round)
7. (India) Prajnesh Gunneswaran (third round)
8. (India) Sumit Nagal (third round)
9. (Italy) Thomas Fabbiano (quarterfinals)
10. (China) Zhang Zhizhen (second round)
11. (Slovenia) Blaž Rola (quarterfinals)
12. (Serbia) Nikola Milojević (second round)
13. (Belarus) Ilya Ivashka (quarterfinals)
14. (Egypt) Mohamed Safwat (third round)
15. (Belgium) Kimmer Coppejans (second round)
16. (Czech Republic) Lukáš Rosol (second round)
17. (India) Ramkumar Ramanathan (third round)

== Draw ==
Key

- Q = Qualifier
- WC = Wild card
- LL = Lucky loser
- Alt = Alternate
- ITF = ITF entry
- PR = Protected ranking
- SR = Special ranking
- SE = Special exempt
- JE = Junior exempt
- JR = Junior Accelerator Programme entrant
- CO = College Accelerator Programme entrant
- NG = Next Gen Accelerator Program entrant
- w/o = Walkover
- r = Retired
- d = Defaulted

=== Finals ===
Quarterfinals
13	(Belarus) Ilya Ivashka	6^{4}	7^{7}	4
(Italy) Julian Ocleppo	7^{7}	6^{3}	6
4	(Australia) James Duckworth	6^{5}	6	6
9	(Italy) Thomas Fabbiano	7^{7}	0	2
(France) Benjamin Bonzi	6^{5}	7	6
3	(Japan) Yūichi Sugita	7^{7}	5	4
11	(Slovenia) Blaž Rola	4	6	2
2	(Italy) Stefano Travaglia	6	4	6

Semifinals
(Italy) Julian Ocleppo	3	2
4	(Australia) James Duckworth	6	6
(France) Benjamin Bonzi	6	6
2	(Italy) Stefano Travaglia	3	4

Final
4	(Australia) James Duckworth	6	6
(France) Benjamin Bonzi	4	4

=== Top half ===
==== Section 1 ====
First round
(Germany) D Masur	5	3
Q	(India) Abhinav Sanjeev Shanmugam	7	6
(Slovenia) B Kavčič	6	3	4
(India) S Mukund	2	6	6
Q	(India) A Chandrasekar	2	1
(Italy) J Ocleppo	6	6
(India) Sidharth Rawat	3	7^{7}	7^{7}
(Croatia) B Gojo	6	6^{3}	6^{3}

Second round
17	(India) R Ramanathan	6	6
Q	(India) AS Shanmugam	1	3
(India) S Mukund	5	3
13	(Belarus) I Ivashka	7	6
10	(China) Zh Zhang	1	3
(Italy) J Ocleppo	6	6
(India) S Rawat	6	6
LL	(India) Rishi Reddy	2	2

Third round
17	(India) R Ramanathan	6^{2}	1
13	(Belarus) I Ivashka	7^{7}	6
(Italy) J Ocleppo	7	6
(India) S Rawat	5	4

Quarterfinals
13	(Belarus) I Ivashka	6^{4}	7^{7}	4
(Italy) J Ocleppo	7^{7}	6^{3}	6

==== Section 2 ====
First round
WC	(India) SDP Dev	2	1
(Uzbekistan) K Sultanov	6	6
(Egypt) K-M Maamoun	1	6	0
(Portugal) F Ferreira Silva	6	3	6
(France) L Lokoli	6	7^{7}
(Czech Republic) A Pavlásek	3	6^{4}
(Russia) A Karatsev	3	3
(India) S Myneni	6	6

Second round
4	(Australia) J Duckworth	6	7^{7}
(Uzbekistan) K Sultanov	4	6^{5}
(Portugal) F Ferreira Silva	6	3	7
15	(Belgium) K Coppejans	3	6	5
9	(Italy) T Fabbiano	6	2	6
(France) L Lokoli	3	6	1
(India) S Myneni	6	6
6	(Russia) E Donskoy	3	3

Third round
4	(Australia) J Duckworth	7^{11}	6
(Portugal) F Ferreira Silva	6^{9}	1
9	(Italy) T Fabbiano	6	5	6
(India) S Myneni	4	7	2

Quarterfinals
4	(Australia) J Duckworth	6^{5}	6	6
9	(Italy) T Fabbiano	7^{7}	0	2

=== Bottom half ===
==== Section 3 ====
First round
(Russia) B Bobrov	2	3
Alt	(Germany) S Fanselow	6	6
Alt	(India) Manish Sureshkumar	2	3
(France) B Bonzi	6	6
WC	(India) N Kaliyanda Poonacha	6	6^{5}	7^{7}
WC	(India) A Kalyanpur	4	7^{7}	6^{4}
(Czech Republic) V Šafránek	7^{7}	7
(Italy) Fabrizio Ornago	6^{5}	5

Second round
7	(India) P Gunneswaran	6	4	6
Alt	(Germany) S Fanselow	2	6	4
(France) B Bonzi	6	6
12	(Serbia) N Milojević	4	1
16	(Czech Republic) L Rosol	4	6	3
WC	(India) N Kaliyanda Poonacha	6	2	6
(Czech Republic) V Šafránek	4	3
3	(Japan) Y Sugita	6	6

Third round
7	(India) P Gunneswaran	6^{5}	0
(France) B Bonzi	7^{7}	6
WC	(India) N Kaliyanda Poonacha	5	3
3	(Japan) Y Sugita	7	6

Quarterfinals
(France) B Bonzi	6^{5}	7	6
3	(Japan) Y Sugita	7^{7}	5	4

==== Section 4 ====
First round
WC	(India) A Kadhe	2	6^{5}
(Tunisia) M Jaziri	6	7^{7}
(Ukraine) V Orlov	6	6
WC	(India) Suraj Prabodh	2	2
(Australia) M Ebden	6	4	7^{7}
(Chinese Taipei) T-h Yang	0	6	6^{2}
(Italy) F Baldi	6	7
(Russia) E Karlovskiy	2	5

Second round
8	(India) S Nagal	6	6
(Tunisia) M Jaziri	0	4
(Ukraine) V Orlov	5	3
11	(Slovenia) B Rola	7	6
14	(Egypt) M Safwat	7^{7}	6^{1}	7
(Australia) M Ebden	6^{5}	7^{7}	5
(Italy) F Baldi	2	1
2	(Italy) S Travaglia	6	6

Third round
8	(India) S Nagal	3	3
11	(Slovenia) B Rola	6	6
14	(Egypt) M Safwat	2	6^{5}
2	(Italy) S Travaglia	6	7^{7}

Quarterfinals
11	(Slovenia) B Rola	4	6	2
2	(Italy) S Travaglia	6	4	6
