= 2026 Metepec Open =

- Date: 16 – 22 February
- Edition: 1st
- Surface: Hard
- Location: Metepec, Mexico

Champions

Singles
- (Croatia) Borna Gojo

Doubles
- (United States) Pranav Kumar / (United States) Karl Poling
- Metepec Open

The 2026 Chaca Challenger Metepec Open was a professional tennis tournament played on hard courts. It was the first edition of the tournament, which was part of the 2026 ATP Challenger Tour. It took place in Metepec, Mexico between 16 and 22 February 2026.

== Singles main-draw entrants ==
=== Seeds ===
Country	Player	Rank^{1}	Seed
ARG	Juan Pablo Ficovich	182	1
AUS	Bernard Tomic	192	2
MEX	Rodrigo Pacheco Méndez	222	3
CAN	Alexis Galarneau	236	4
CRO	Borna Gojo	237	5
ECU	Andrés Andrade	254	6
USA	Andres Martin	270	7
USA	Stefan Kozlov	273	8

- ^{1} Rankings are as of 9 February 2026.

=== Other entrants ===
The following players received wildcards into the singles main draw:

- (Mexico) Rafael de Alba
- (Mexico) Alan Fernando Rubio Fierros
- (Mexico) Alan Raúl Sau Franco

The following player received entry into the singles main draw using a protected ranking:

- (Netherlands) Gijs Brouwer

The following players received entry into the singles main draw as alternates:

- (United States) Ryan Dickerson
- (United States) Ryan Fishback

The following players received entry from the qualifying draw:

- (United States) Alafia Ayeni
- (France) Guillaume Dalmasso
- (United Kingdom) Ben Jones
- (United States) Cannon Kingsley
- (United States) Axel Nefve
- (Brazil) Natan Rodrigues

== Champions ==
=== Singles ===
- (Croatia) Borna Gojo def. (Canada) Alexis Galarneau 6–1, 6–4.

=== Doubles ===
- (United States) Pranav Kumar / (United States) Karl Poling def. (United Kingdom) Scott Duncan / (United Kingdom) Ben Jones 6–2, 6–3.
