= Metepec Open =

- 2026 Metepec Open

ATP Challenger Tour
- Location: Metepec, Mexico
- Venue: Club Deportivo La Asunción
- Category: ATP Challenger Tour
- Surface: Hard
- Prize money: $107,000

The Chaca Challenger Metepec Open is a professional tennis tournament played on hardcourts. It is currently part of the ATP Challenger Tour. It was first held in Metepec, Mexico in 2026.

== Past finals ==
=== Singles ===
Year	Champion	Runner-up	Score
2026	(Croatia) Borna Gojo	(Canada) Alexis Galarneau	6–1, 6–4

=== Doubles ===
Year	Champions	Runners-up	Score
2026	(United States) Pranav Kumar (United States) Karl Poling	(United Kingdom) Scott Duncan (United Kingdom) Ben Jones	6–2, 6–3
