= 2026 Baton Rouge Challenger =

- Date: 9 – 15 February
- Edition: 1st
- Surface: Hard (indoor)
- Location: Baton Rouge, Louisiana, United States

Champions

Singles
- (United States) Stefan Dostanic

Doubles
- (United States) Alafia Ayeni / (United States) Keegan Smith
- Baton Rouge Challenger

The 2026 Steve Carter Baton Rouge Challenger was a professional tennis tournament played on indoor hardcourts. It was the first edition of the tournament which was part of the 2026 ATP Challenger Tour. It took place in Baton Rouge, Louisiana, United States from 9 to 15 February 2026.

== Singles main-draw entrants ==
=== Seeds ===
Country	Player	Rank^{1}	Seed
CAN	Alexis Galarneau	232	1
ECU	Andrés Andrade	257	2
USA	Andres Martin	274	3
~~USA~~	~~Stefan Kozlov~~	~~283~~	~~4~~
USA	Garrett Johns	288	5
~~GER~~	~~Cedrik-Marcel Stebe~~	~~320~~	~~6~~
USA	Tyler Zink	332	7
USA	Keegan Smith	338	8

- ^{1} Rankings are as of 2 February 2026.

=== Other entrants ===
The following players received wildcards into the singles main draw:

- (United States) Matthew Forbes
- (United States) Braden Shick
- (United States) Quinn Vandecasteele

The following player received entry into the singles main draw through the Junior Accelerator programme:

- (United States) Jack Kennedy

The following players received entry into the singles main draw as alternates:

- (Turkey) Arda Azkara
- (Canada) Justin Boulais

The following players received entry from the qualifying draw:

- (United States) Felix Corwin
- (United States) Stefan Dostanic
- (United States) Ryan Fishback
- (France) Andrej Loncarevic
- (Latvia) Kārlis Ozoliņš
- (United States) Noah Schachter

The following players received entry as lucky losers:

- (Canada) Benjamin Thomas George
- (United Kingdom) Ben Jones

== Champions ==
=== Singles ===
- (United States) Stefan Dostanic def. (Canada) Alexis Galarneau 6–4, 6–1.

=== Doubles ===
- (United States) Alafia Ayeni / (United States) Keegan Smith def. (United States) Ronald Hohmann / (United States) Andres Martin 5–7, 6–3, [10–7].
