= 2023 Open Rionegro =

- Date: 26 June – 1 July
- Edition: 1st
- Surface: Clay
- Location: Rionegro, Colombia

Champions

Singles
- (United States) Patrick Kypson

Doubles
- (Colombia) Juan Sebastián Gómez / (Colombia) Andrés Urrea
Open Rionegro	· 2024 →

The 2023 Jumbo Open Rionegro was a professional tennis tournament played on clay courts. It was the first edition of the tournament which was part of the 2023 ATP Challenger Tour. It took place in Rionegro, Colombia between 26 June and 1 July 2023.

== Singles main-draw entrants ==
=== Seeds ===
Country	Player	Rank^{1}	Seed
COL	Nicolás Mejía	248	1
ARG	Santiago Rodríguez Taverna	253	2
ARG	Federico Delbonis	266	3
BRA	João Lucas Reis da Silva	273	4
ARG	Guido Andreozzi	286	5
CRO	Nino Serdarušić	293	6
USA	Patrick Kypson	328	7
AUS	Tristan Schoolkate	331	8

- ^{1} Rankings are as of 19 June 2023.

=== Other entrants ===
The following players received wildcards into the singles main draw:

- (Colombia) Nicolás Mejía
- (Colombia) Johan Alexander Rodríguez
- (Colombia) Felipe Santamaría

The following players received entry into the singles main draw using protected rankings:

- (Brazil) Pedro Sakamoto
- (New Zealand) Rubin Statham

The following players received entry from the qualifying draw:

- (Colombia) Juan Sebastián Gómez
- (United States) Aidan Mayo
- (United States) Tristan McCormick
- (Australia) Calum Puttergill
- (Chile) Matías Soto
- (Brazil) Nicolas Zanellato

The following player received entry as a lucky loser:

- (Argentina) Ignacio Monzón

== Champions ==
=== Singles ===
- (United States) Patrick Kypson def. (Zimbabwe) Benjamin Lock 6–3, 6–3.

=== Doubles ===
- (Colombia) Juan Sebastián Gómez / (Colombia) Andrés Urrea def. (Brazil) Orlando Luz / (Ukraine) Oleg Prihodko 6–3, 7–6^{(12–10)}.
