= McGorty junk news websites =

Fake news website network

The McGorty junk news websites are a network of fake news websites that were run by Matt McGorty. BuzzFeed News found over 100 sites from 2015 to 2020.

Typically, the sites started with plagiarized news from other sites, with updated publish dates, to gain credibility. They would then add press releases and other sources. These would then be featured in Google News and be monetized with Google AdSense and other schemes. Content was typically locally oriented or related to finance.

McGorty worked for Thomson Reuters and Intrado, a subsidiary of Nasdaq. McGorty said he was unaware that the content provider was publishing copied content.

Google News terminated AdSense accounts used by the websites and tuned Google News to not show its content.

The links between the sites were discovered through shared whois records, advertising accounts, web tracking accounts, and other methods, which were linked to a Destin, Florida address. They were confirmed by MarketBeat, a company that paid McGorty for newsletter signups. Some sites had fake names for editors or claimed to be owned by a nonexistent person named Scott Gentry.

== Sites ==
Local-oriented sites include:

- Oracle Beacon (active since 2015)
- Richland Standard (claimed to be based in Bedford, Texas)
- River Dale Standard (claimed to be based in Buckner, Kentucky, copied content from CNN Digital)
- Denton Daily
- Livingston Ledger
- Hoback Herald
- Driscoll Register (copied content by Monique O. Madan from Miami Herald)
- Gentry Business Leader
- Darby Digital News
- DFS Caller

Finance-oriented sites include:

- Cora Courier
- Stock Daily Dish (copied content from the Associated Press, The Journal News)
- Daily Stock Dish
- The Stock Muse

Unconfirmed sites include:

- Wellston Journal
- Jackson Observer
- Valliant News

== MarketBeat ==
MarketBeat, a financial media company owned by Matthew Paulson, paid the McGorty sites for newsletter signups as part of its affiliate program. Its spokesperson said the network of MarketBeat sites are unrelated to the McGorty sites, but operated in a similar manner and contained at least one story plagiarized from the Washington Post.

MarketBeat sites include:

- Cody Courier
- Jamestown Journal
- Torrington Tribune

== See also ==
- Fake news
- Fake news websites in the United States
