= 2026 Sioux Falls Challenger =

- Date: 26 October – 1 November
- Edition: 3rd
- Surface: Hard (indoor)
- Location: Sioux Falls, South Dakota, United States

Champions

Singles
- (Switzerland) Dylan Dietrich

Doubles
- (Netherlands) Jarno Jans / (Belgium) Joran Vliegen
- Sioux Falls Challenger

The 2026 MarketBeat Open was a professional tennis tournament played on indoor hardcourts. It was the third edition of the tournament which was part of the 2026 ATP Challenger Tour. It took place in Sioux Falls, South Dakota, United States between 26 October and 1 November 2026.

== Singles main draw entrants ==
=== Seeds ===
Country	Player	Rank^{1}	Seed
USA	Jenson Brooksby	99	1
FRA	Valentin Royer	110	2
USA	Darwin Blanch	159	3
CAN	Alexis Galarneau	182	4
CAN	Liam Draxl	197	5
USA	Braden Shick	208	6
GBR	Harry Wendelken	213	7
POL	Maks Kaśnikowski	214	8

- ^{1} Rankings are as of 19 October 2026.

=== Other entrants ===
The following players received wildcards into the singles main draw:

- (United States) Kaylan Bigun
- (United States) Sebastian Gorzny
- (United States) Bryce Nakashima

The following player received entry into the singles main draw as a special exempt:

- (United States) Jenson Brooksby

The following players received entry into the singles main draw as alternates:

- (United States) ~~Patrick Maloney~~
- (United States) Aidan Mayo

The following players received entry from the qualifying draw:

- (Poland) Tomasz Berkieta
- (Slovenia) Sebastian Dominko
- (France) Timo Legout
- Daniil Ostapenkov
- (United States) Karl Poling
- (Japan) James Trotter

The following player received entry as a lucky loser:

- (United States) Ozan Baris

== Champions ==
=== Singles ===
- (Switzerland) Dylan Dietrich def. (Canada) Liam Draxl 1–6, 6–3, 6–4.

=== Doubles ===
- (Netherlands) Jarno Jans / (Belgium) Joran Vliegen def. (Mexico) Miguel Ángel Reyes-Varela / (United States) Reese Stalder 6–4, 7–6^{(9–7)}.
