= 2022 Bengaluru Open =

- Date: 7–13 February
- Edition: 5th
- Draw: 32S / 16D
- Surface: Hard
- Location: Bangalore, India

Champions

Singles
- (Chinese Taipei) Tseng Chun-hsin

Doubles
- (India) Saketh Myneni / (India) Ramkumar Ramanathan
- Bengaluru Open

The 2022 Bengaluru Open was a professional tennis tournament played on hard courts. It was the fifth edition of the tournament which was part of the 2022 ATP Challenger Tour. It took place in Bangalore, India from 7 to 13 February 2022.

== Singles main-draw entrants ==
=== Seeds ===
Country	Player	Rank^{1}	Seed
CZE	Jiří Veselý	80	1
ITA	Stefano Travaglia	93	2
AUS	Aleksandar Vukic	140	3
FRA	Hugo Grenier	158	4
TUR	Altuğ Çelikbilek	161	5
FRA	Enzo Couacaud	162	6
~~SWE~~	~~Elias Ymer~~	~~163~~	~~7~~
ITA	Federico Gaio	174	8

- ^{1} Rankings are as of 31 January 2022.

=== Other entrants ===
The following players received wildcards into the singles main draw:

- (India) S D Prajwal Dev
- (India) Saketh Myneni
- (India) Rishi Reddy

The following players received entry from the qualifying draw:

- (Switzerland) Antoine Bellier
- (Brazil) Gabriel Décamps
- (Croatia) Borna Gojo
- (Tunisia) Malek Jaziri
- (India) Arjun Kadhe
- (Japan) Rio Noguchi

The following player received entry as a lucky loser:

- (Canada) Steven Diez

== Champions ==
=== Singles ===
- (Chinese Taipei) Tseng Chun-hsin def. (Croatia) Borna Gojo 6–4, 7–5.

=== Doubles ===
- (India) Saketh Myneni / (India) Ramkumar Ramanathan def. (France) Hugo Grenier / (France) Alexandre Müller 6–3, 6–2.
