= MarketBeat =

American financial digital media company

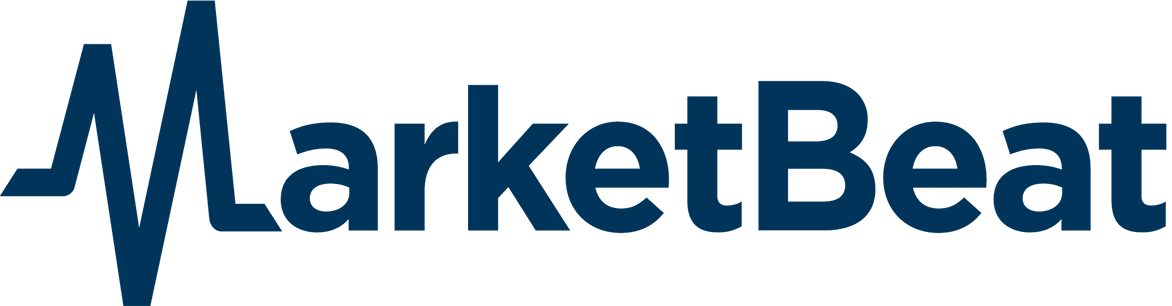
- Website type: Financial Information
- Headquarters: Sioux Falls, South Dakota
- Owner: Matthew Paulson
- Editor: Jessica Mitacek
- Website: marketbeat.com
- Launched: 2011 (as Analyst Ratings Network)
- Current status: Online

MarketBeat is a South Dakota-based financial news blog.

The company compiles data sources and tracks analyst ratings from equities analysts in the United States, United Kingdom, and Canada. MarketBeat's website has information on analyst ratings, corporate buybacks, dividends, earnings, financials, insider trades, IPOs, SEC filings, and stock splits.

In 2020, BuzzFeed reported that MarketBeat had compensated the McGorty junk news websites for signups through its affiliate program.

== History ==
MarketBeat was founded by Matthew Paulson, a native of Mitchell, South Dakota. It was incorporated in 2011 under the name Analyst Ratings Network. The company's roots are traced to a personal finance blog called American Consumer News started by Paulson in 2006 in his college dorm at Dakota State University. It rebranded to MarketBeat in 2015.

The company has achieved rapid growth, with Paulson claiming a profit margin of up to 85%, fueling growth. Services include newsletters, a daily analysis of stock market data, and premium research tools. The company offers a personalized dashboard allowing subscribers to track their investments' related data. It includes access to stock ratings and calls from 300,000 analysts. In 2019, the company claimed to have over one million subscribers to its email newsletters and over 5,000 members paying for premium access.

In 2020, MarketBeat was included in the Inc. 5000 list of fastest-growing private companies in America. It also opened a physical office in a shift after previously being focused on remote work. The company again made the Inc. 5000 list in 2023 and its Midwest regionals, marking its 8th consecutive year on the Inc. 5000 list and fourth consecutive year on the Midwest list.
