= Baton Rouge Challenger =

Steve Carter Baton Rouge Challenger
- 2026 Baton Rouge Challenger

ATP Challenger Tour
- Location: Baton Rouge, Louisiana, United States
- Category: ATP Challenger Tour
- Surface: Hard (indoor)
- Website: Website

The Steve Carter Baton Rouge Challenger is a professional tennis tournament played on indoor hardcourts. It is currently part of the ATP Challenger Tour. It was first held in Baton Rouge, Louisiana, United States in 2026.

== Past finals ==
=== Singles ===
Year	Champion	Runner-up	Score
2026	(United States) Stefan Dostanic	(Canada) Alexis Galarneau	6–4, 6–1

=== Doubles ===
Year	Champions	Runners-up	Score
2026	(United States) Alafia Ayeni (United States) Keegan Smith	(United States) Ronald Hohmann (United States) Andres Martin	5–7, 6–3, [10–7]
