= Open Rionegro =

Defunct tennis tournament
- Event name: Jumbo Open Rionegro
- Location: Rionegro, Antioquia, Colombia
- Venue: Club Campestre Llanogrande, Rionegro
- Category: ATP Challenger Tour
- Surface: Clay
- Website: website

The Jumbo Open Rionegro was a professional tennis tournament played on clay courts. It was part of the ATP Challenger Tour. It was held in Llanogrande, Rionegro near Medellín, Colombia in 2023.

== Past finals ==
=== Singles ===
Year	Champion	Runner-up	Score
2023	(United States) Patrick Kypson	(Zimbabwe) Benjamin Lock	6–3, 6–3

=== Doubles ===
Year	Champions	Runners-up	Score
2023	(Colombia) Juan Sebastián Gómez (Colombia) Andrés Urrea	(Brazil) Orlando Luz (Ukraine) Oleg Prihodko	6–3, 7–6^{(12–10)}
