= Sioux Falls Challenger =

Sioux Falls Open
- 2025 Sioux Falls Challenger

ATP Challenger Tour
- Event name: MarketBeat Open
- Location: Sioux Falls, South Dakota, United States
- Category: ATP Challenger Tour (2024), Challenger 100 (2025-)
- Surface: Hard (indoor)
- Prize money: $160,000 (2025), $82,000 (2024)

The MarketBeat Open (sponsored by MarketBeat) is a professional tennis tournament played on indoor hardcourts. It is currently part of the ATP Challenger Tour. It was first held in Sioux Falls, South Dakota, United States in 2024.

== Past finals ==
=== Singles ===
Year	Champion	Runner-up	Score
2026	(Switzerland) Dylan Dietrich	(Canada) Liam Draxl	1–6, 6–3, 6–4
2025	(United States) Patrick Kypson	(United Kingdom) Johannus Monday	6–7^{(2–7)}, 7–6^{(7–4)}, 7–5
2024	(Croatia) Borna Gojo	(United States) Colton Smith	6–1, 7–5

=== Doubles ===
Year	Champions	Runners-up	Score
2026	(Netherlands) Jarno Jans (Belgium) Joran Vliegen	(Mexico) Miguel Ángel Reyes-Varela (United States) Reese Stalder	6–4, 7–6^{(9–7)}
2025	(Australia) Rinky Hijikata (United States) Mac Kiger	(Venezuela) Juan José Bianchi (United States) Andrew Fenty	6–4, 6–4
2024	(Canada) Liam Draxl (Canada) Cleeve Harper	(United States) Ryan Seggerman (United States) Patrik Trhac	7–5, 6–3
