= Patrick Kypson =

American tennis player (born 1999)

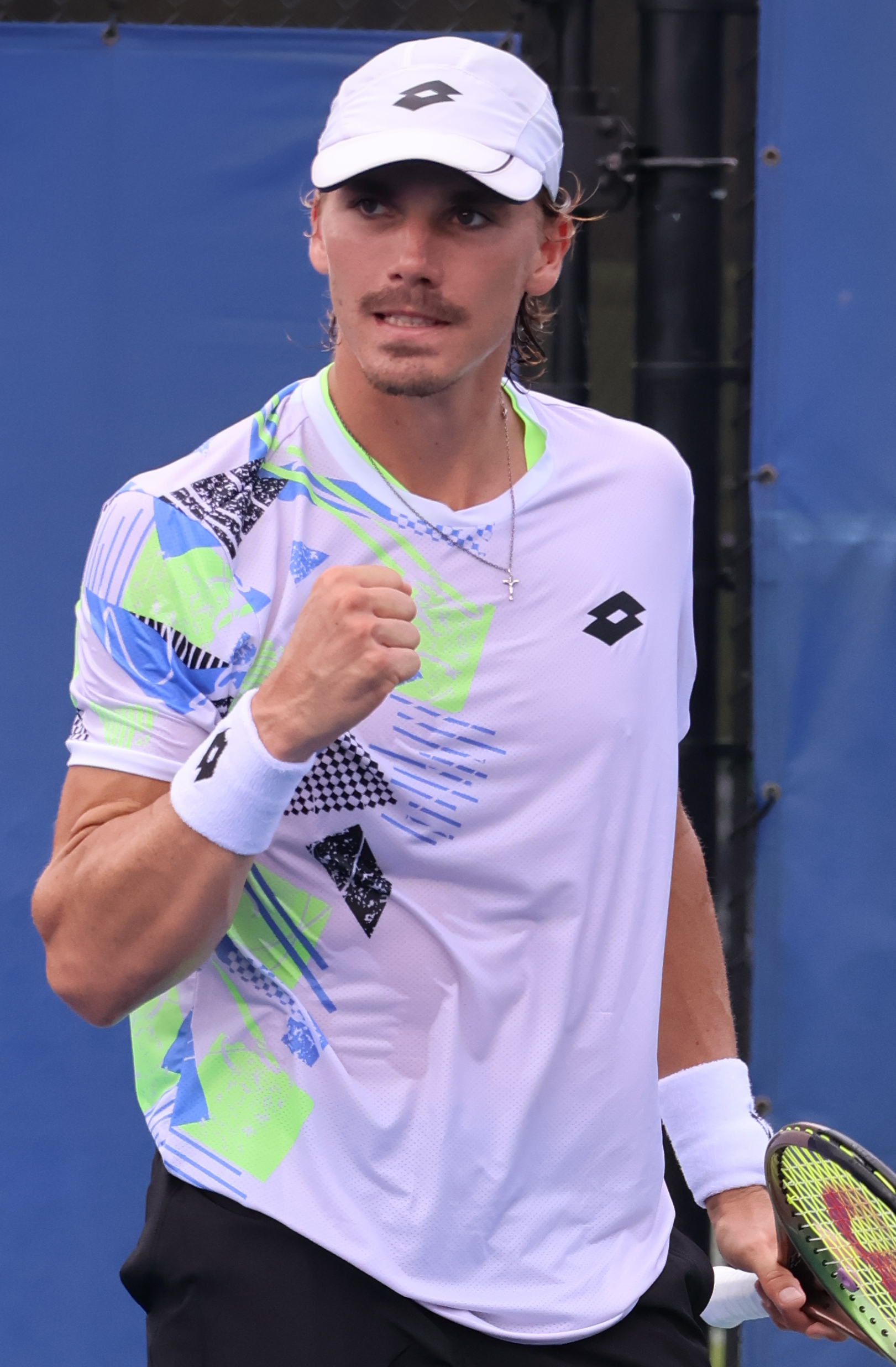
- Kypson at the 2023 Cary Challenger II
- Country (sports): United States
- Residence: Raleigh, North Carolina, U.S.
- Born: 28 October 1999 (age 26) Durham, North Carolina, U.S.
- Height: 1.88 m (6 ft 2 in)
- Turned pro: 2017
- Plays: Right-handed (two-handed backhand)
- College: Texas A&M
- Coach: Alejandro Gonzalez
- Prize money: US $1,053,885

Singles
- Career record: 4–13
- Career titles: 0
- Highest ranking: No. 89 (May 4, 2026)
- Current ranking: No. 114 (June 15, 2026)

Grand Slam singles results
- Australian Open: 1R (2024, 2026)
- French Open: 1R (2023)
- Wimbledon: 2R (2026)
- US Open: 1R (2017)

Doubles
- Career record: 0–1
- Career titles: 0
- Highest ranking: No. 577 (27 May 2019)

Grand Slam doubles results
- US Open: 1R (2018)
- Last updated on: May 4, 2026.

Patrick Kypson (born 28 October 1999) is an American professional tennis player. Kypson has a career-high ATP singles ranking of world No. 89 achieved on May 4, 2026 and a doubles ranking of No. 577 achieved in May 27, 2019.

== Career ==
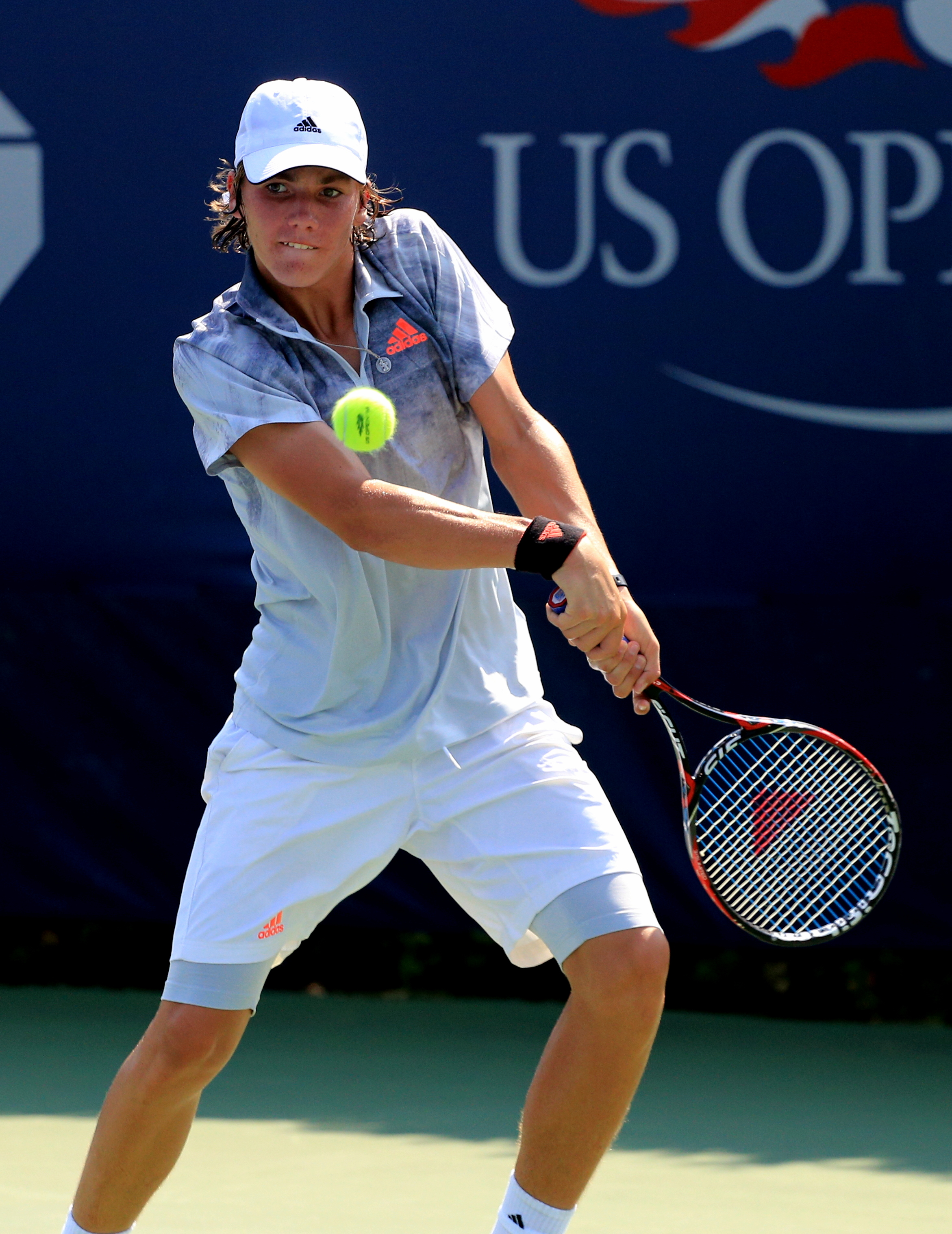
Kypson at the 2025 US Open

=== 2017: Major debut ===
Kypson made his Grand Slam main draw debut at the 2017 US Open after receiving a wildcard for winning the under-18 boys championship.

In November 2017, Kypson won his first title on the ITF Men's Circuit in Niceville, Florida, beating Sekou Bangoura in the final.

=== 2023: French Open wildcard, Challenger title, top 200 ===
Kypson received a wildcard for the 2023 French Open after winning the USTA's Roland Garros Wild Card challenge.

In July, Kypson won his first Challenger title in Medellín, Colombia, beating Benjamin Lock in the final.

=== 2024: First ATP win & quarterfinal, top 150 & Masters debuts ===
For his debut at the 2024 Australian Open, Kypson received a reciprocal wildcard, having won the 2024 USTA Australian Open Wild Card challenge.

Ranked No. 155, he also entered as a wildcard at the 2024 Delray Beach Open and recorded his first ATP win with an upset over previous year runner-up and fifth seed Miomir Kecmanović. As a result, he reached the top 150 in the rankings. Next he defeated Constant Lestienne to reach his first ATP quarterfinal. He also received a wildcard for the 2024 BNP Paribas Open for his Masters 1000 debut, and recorded his first Masters win over qualifier and compatriot Ethan Quinn.

=== 2025: Four Challenger titles, top 125 ===
In October, Kypson claimed his third Challenger title of the season at the 2025 MarketBeat Open and returned to the top 150 in the singles rankings on 27 October 2025. As of 28 October, Kypson was again in the lead of the USTA competition, awarding the 2026 Australian Open WildCards.

In November, Kypson reached his fifth Challenger final of the season at the HPP Open in Helsinki, where he defeated home crowd favorite Otto Virtanen to lift his fourth Challenger title. As a result Kypson reached a new career-high ranking in the top 125 at world No. 117 on 10 November 2025 and clinched the 2026 USTA Australian Open wildcard.

=== 2026: First top 10 win, Top 100 ===
Following reaching the second round at the 2026 Abierto Mexicano Telcel with a top 10 win over second seed Alex de Minaur, Kypson reached the top 100 on 2 March 2026 at world No. 95. It was his first tour-level win since Indian Wells in 2024.

== ATP Challenger and ITF Tour finals ==
=== Singles: 12 (10 titles, 2 runner-ups) ===
Legend ATP Challenger Tour (7–1) ITF Futures/WTT (3–1)	Finals by surface Hard (5–2) Clay (5–0)

Result	W–L	Date	Tournament	Tier	Surface	Opponent	Score
Win	1–0	Jun 2023	Open Rionegro, Colombia	Challenger	Clay	(Zimbabwe) Benjamin Lock	6–3, 6–3
Win	2–0	Nov 2023	Champaign Challenger, US	Challenger	Hard (i)	(United States) Alex Michelsen	6–4, 6–3
Win	3–0	Jan 2024	Cleveland Open, US	Challenger	Hard (i)	(United States) Ethan Quinn	4–6, 6–3, 6–2
Win	4–0	May 2025	Open Bogotá, Colombia	Challenger	Clay	(Brazil) Pedro Sakamoto	6–1, 6–3
Win	5–0	May 2025	Little Rock Challenger, US	Challenger	Hard	(United States) Michael Zheng	6–1, 1–6, 7–5
Loss	5–1	Sep 2025	Open de Vendée, France	Challenger	Hard (i)	(Norway) Nicolai Budkov Kjær	0–6, 3–6
Win	6–1	Oct 2025	MarketBeat Open, US	Challenger	Hard (i)	(United Kingdom) Johannus Monday	6–7^{(2–7)}, 7–6^{(7–4)}, 7–5
Win	7–1	Nov 2025	HPP Open, Finland	Challenger	Hard (i)	(Finland) Otto Virtanen	4–6, 6–3, 6–4

Result	W–L	Date	Tournament	Tier	Surface	Opponent	Score
Win	1–0	Nov 2017	US F36, Niceville	Futures	Clay	(United States) Sekou Bangoura	7–5, 5–7, 6–1
Win	2–0	Mar 2020	M15 Antalya, Turkey	WTT	Clay	(Germany) Peter Heller	6–4, 6–2
Loss	2–1	Jun 2021	M25 Wichita, US	WTT	Hard	(United States) Govind Nanda	6–7^{(6–8)}, 2–6
Win	3–1	Jul 2021	M15 Esch-sur-Alzette, Luxembourg	WTT	Clay	(Romania) Nicholas David Ionel	4–6, 6–3, 7–5

=== Doubles: 3 (1 title, 2 runner-ups) ===
Legend ATP Challenger Tour (0–1) ITF Futures (1–1)	Finals by surface Hard (0–1) Clay (1–1)

Result	W–L	Date	Tournament	Tier	Surface	Partner	Opponents	Score
Loss	0–1	Sep 2024	Tiburon Challenger, US	Challenger	Hard	(United States) Eliot Spizzirri	(Australia) Luke Saville (Australia) Tristan Schoolkate	4–6, 2–6

Result	W–L	Date	Tournament	Tier	Surface	Partner	Opponents	Score
Win	1–0	Nov 2016	US F36, Niceville	Futures	Clay	(Canada) Félix Auger-Aliassime	(United States) Patrick Daciek (United States) Dane Webb	7–5, 6–1
Loss	1–1	Jun 2017	Netherlands F1, Alkmaar	Futures	Clay	(United States) Sam Riffice	(Netherlands) Botic van de Zandschulp (Netherlands) Boy Westerhof	2–6, 7–5, [12–14]

== Wins against top-10 players ==
- Kypson's match record against players who were, at the time the match was played, ranked in the top 10.

Season	2026	Total
Wins	1	1

#	Player	Rk	Event	Surface	Rd	Score	Rk	Ref
2026
1.	(Australia) Alex de Minaur	6	Mexican Open, Mexico	Hard	1R	6–1, 6–7^{(4–7)}, 7–6^{(7–4)}	103	
