= Borna Gojo =

Croatian tennis player

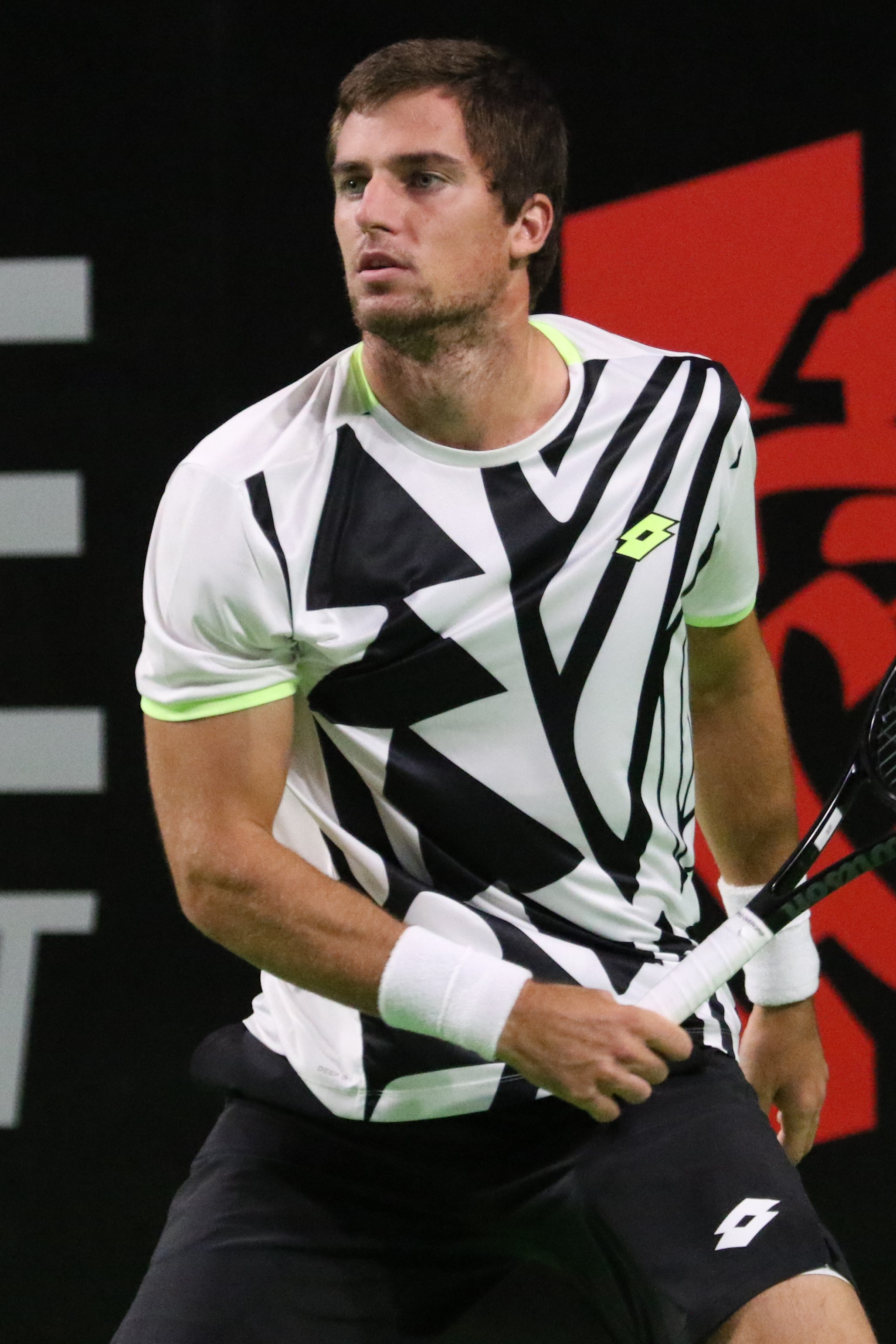
- Gojo at the 2021 Internationaux de Tennis de Vendée
- Country (sports): Croatia
- Residence: Split, Croatia
- Born: 27 February 1998 (age 28) Split, Croatia
- Height: 1.96 m (6 ft 5 in)
- Turned pro: 2020
- Plays: Right-handed (two-handed backhand)
- College: Wake Forest
- Prize money: US $1,599,137

Singles
- Career record: 20–29
- Career titles: 0
- Highest ranking: No. 72 (20 November 2023)
- Current ranking: No. 127 (16 November 2026)

Grand Slam singles results
- Australian Open: Q3 (2021, 2025)
- French Open: 2R (2022)
- Wimbledon: 1R (2023)
- US Open: 4R (2023)

Doubles
- Career record: 0–1
- Career titles: 0
- Highest ranking: No. 394 (17 January 2022)

Grand Slam doubles results
- Australian Open: 1R (2025)

Team competitions
- Davis Cup: F (2021)
- Last updated on: 18 November 2026.

Borna Gojo (Croatian pronunciation: [bôːrna ɡǒːjo]; born 27 February 1998) is a Croatian professional tennis player. He has a career-high ATP singles ranking of world No. 72 achieved on 20 November 2023 and a doubles ranking of world No. 394 achieved on 17 January 2022. He is currently the No. 3 Croatian player.

== College career ==
Gojo played college tennis at Wake Forest University, where he was part of the team that won the NCAA National Championship in 2018 while being named the tournament's most outstanding player.

== Professional career ==
=== 2018-2021: ATP & top 250 debuts, Davis Cup finalist ===
Gojo made his ATP main draw debut at the 2018 Winston-Salem Open after receiving a wildcard for the singles main draw. He faced American Ryan Harrison and lost 2–6, 4–6. He made his top 250 debut at No. 245 on 19 October 2020.

Borna lost in the finals with team Croatia in the 2021 Davis Cup.

=== 2022: Major debut & first win, Maiden Challenger title & top 150 ===
At the 2022 French Open he qualified for his first Grand Slam in his career. He defeated fellow qualifier and lucky loser Alessandro Giannessi in five sets for his first Grand Slam win but lost to Serbian Filip Krajinović.

He moved 34 positions up into the top 150 at No. 148 on 31 October 2022, following his maiden title at the 2022 Sparkassen ATP Challenger in Ortisei.

=== 2023: Masters, Wimbledon, US Open debuts and fourth round, top 75 ===
He made his debut on 9 January 2023 in the top 125 at world No. 124.

He made his Masters 1000 debut in Indian Wells as a qualifier, where he lost in the first round to Richard Gasquet and at the 2023 Mutua Madrid Open also as a qualifier where he lost to Thiago Monteiro. He reached a few spots shy of the top 100 in the rankings on 8 May 2023.

Gojo made his debut at the 2023 Wimbledon Championships as a direct entry into the main draw. He qualified for the next Major at the 2023 US Open and reached the fourth round for the first time at a Major defeating Hugo Dellien, Mackenzie McDonald and Jiří Veselý. He lost to second seed and eventual champion Novak Djokovic. As a result, he reached the top 100 at world No. 77 climbing 28 spots on 11 September 2023.

Ranked No. 77, he received a wildcard for the 2023 Erste Bank Open in Vienna, Austria where he defeated Aslan Karatsev and sixth seed Tommy Paul to reach the quarterfinals. He finished the season at a career-high ranking of world No. 72 on 20 November 2023.

=== 2024-2026: Hiatus, back to top 125 ===
Following a seven months hiatus, that started in January 2024 due to back injury, Gojo won his first Challenger in two years at the inaugural edition of the 2024 Sioux Falls Challenger.

In April 2025, he qualified for the newly upgraded ATP 500, the 2025 BMW Open, but lost to eventual finalist Ben Shelton. At the 2025 Mutua Madrid Open he reached his first Masters main draw in two years also as a qualifier. In May, after his first three-round wins at the 2025 Open Aix Provence over Hugo Gaston, Daniel Elahi Galán and qualifier Valentin Vacherot, Gojo reached the semifinals. As a result, he rose 100 positions up to return to the top 255 in the singles rankings on 5 May 2025. In mid-May, Gojo qualified for the main draw of the ATP 500 2025 Hamburg Open defeating Dimitar Kuzmanov, before losing to Jiří Lehečka. As a result, he moved back into the top 250 in the singles rankings on 26 May 2025. By the end of November 2026, following two main draw showings at the 2026 Lyon Open and the 2026 Stockholm Open, Gojo ended the 2026 season in the top 125 in the rankings on 23 November 2026.

== Performance timeline ==
Key
W	F	SF	QF	#R	RR	Q#	DNQ	A	NH

(W) winner; (F) finalist; (SF) semifinalist; (QF) quarterfinalist; (#R) rounds 4, 3, 2, 1; (RR) round-robin stage; (Q#) qualification round; (DNQ) did not qualify; (A) absent; (NH) not held; (SR) strike rate (events won / competed); (W–L) win–loss record.
To avoid confusion and double counting, these charts are updated at the conclusion of a tournament or when the player's participation has ended.

=== Singles ===
Current through the 2026 Mutua Madrid Open – Men's singles#Qualifying

Tournament	2018	2019	2020	2021	2022	2023	2024	2025	2026	SR	W–L
Grand Slam tournaments
Australian Open	A	A	A	Q3	A	A	A	Q3	A	0 / 0	0–0
French Open	A	A	A	Q2	2R	Q2	A	A	Q3	0 / 1	1–1
Wimbledon	A	A	A	Q1	Q1	1R	A	Q1	Q2	0 / 1	0–1
US Open	A	A	A	Q1	Q2	4R	Q2	Q1	Q2	0 / 1	3–1
Win–loss	0–0	0–0	0–0	0–0	1–1	3–2	0–0	0–0	0–0	0 / 3	4–3
National representation
Davis Cup	A	RR	QR	F	SF	RR				0 / 4	7–6
ATP Masters 1000
Indian Wells Masters	A	A	NH	A	A	1R	A	A	A	0 / 1	0–1
Miami Open	A	A	NH	A	A	Q2	A	A	A	0 / 0	0–0
Monte-Carlo	A	A	NH	A	A	A	A	Q1	A	0 / 0	0–0
Madrid Open	A	A	NH	A	A	1R	A	1R	Q1	0 / 2	0–2
Italian Open	A	A	NH	A	A	Q1				0 / 0	0–0
Canadian Open	A	A	NH	A	A	Q1				0 / 0	0–0
Cincinnati Masters	A	A	NH	A	A	A				0 / 0	0–0
Shanghai Masters	A	A	NH	A	A	A				0 / 0	0–0
Win–loss	0–0	0–0	0–0	0–0	0–0	0–2	0–0	0–1	0–0	0 / 3	0–3
Career statistics
Tournaments	1	0	0	2	3	9	2	5	2	24	
Overall win–loss	0–1	0–2	1–0	3–3	3–5	12–9	1–2	0–5	2–2	22–29	
Year-end ranking	335	276	221	284	144	72	443	291		$1,288,463	

== ATP Challenger Tour finals ==
=== Singles: 8 (4 titles, 4 runner-ups) ===
Legend ATP Challenger Tour (4–4)	Finals by surface Hard (4–3) Clay (0–1)

Result	W–L	Date	Tournament	Tier	Surface	Opponent	Score
Loss	0–1	Feb 2022	Bengaluru, India	Challenger	Hard	(Chinese Taipei) Tseng Chun-hsin	4–6, 5–7
Win	1–1	Oct 2022	Ortisei, Italy	Challenger	Hard (i)	(Slovakia) Lukáš Klein	7–6^{(7–4)}, 6–3
Loss	1–2	Feb 2023	Monterrey, Mexico	Challenger	Hard	(Portugal) Nuno Borges	4–6, 6–7^{(6–8)}
Loss	1–3	Apr 2023	Murcia, Spain	Challenger	Clay	(Italy) Matteo Arnaldi	4–6, 6–7^{(4–7)}
Win	2–3	Oct 2024	Sioux Falls, USA	Challenger	Hard (i)	(United States) Colton Smith	6–1, 7–5
Loss	2–4	Feb 2026	Cleveland, USA	Challenger	Hard (i)	(United States) Colton Smith	4–6, 5–7
Win	3–4	Feb 2026	Metepec, Mexico	Challenger	Hard	(Canada) Alexis Galarneau	6–1, 6–4
Win	4–4	Mar 2026	Morelia, Mexico	Challenger	Hard	(Argentina) Juan Pablo Ficovich	7–6^{(7–5)}, 6–2.

== ITF Futures finals ==
=== Singles: 2 (2 runner-ups) ===
Legend ITF Futures (0–2)

Result	W–L	Date	Tournament	Tier	Surface	Opponent	Score
Loss	0–1	Dec 2016	Turkey F49, Antalya	Futures	Hard	(Bulgaria) Alexandar Lazov	6–7^{(6–8)}, 5–7
Loss	0–2	Nov 2017	Malaysia F3, Kuala Lumpur	Futures	Hard	(Netherlands) Scott Griekspoor	4–6, 2–6

=== Doubles 4 (2 titles, 2 runner-ups) ===
Legend ITF Futures (2–2)	Finals by surface Hard (0–1) Clay (2–1)

Result	W–L	Date	Tournament	Tier	Surface	Partner	Opponents	Score
Loss	0–1	Jul 2016	Serbia F2, Sombor	Futures	Clay	(Croatia) Domagoj Bilješko	(Montenegro) Ljubomir Čelebić (Bosnia and Herzegovina) Nerman Fatić	6–1, 3–6, [6–10]
Win	1–1	Sep 2016	Serbia F6, Zlatibor	Futures	Clay	(Croatia) Domagoj Bilješko	(Serbia) Goran Marković (Croatia) Antun Vidak	6–1, 6–7^{(1–7)}, [11–9]
Win	2–1	Oct 2016	Croatia F10, Bol	Futures	Clay	(Croatia) Nino Serdarušić	(Serbia) Ivan Bjelica (Serbia) Darko Jandrić	6–3, 6–7^{(11–13)}, [10–5]
Loss	2–2	Dec 2016	Turkey F49, Antalya	Futures	Hard	(Czech Republic) Ondřej Krstev	(Turkey) Tuna Altuna (Russia) Alexander Pavlioutchenkov	6–3, 3–6, [12–14]

== National representation ==
=== Davis Cup (9–6) ===
Group membership Finals (6–6) Qualifying Round (2–0) World Group I (1–0)	Matches by surface Hard (9–6) Clay (0–0) Grass (0–0)	Matches by type Singles (9–6) Doubles (0–0)	Matches by venue Home (5–1) Away (1–2) Neutral (3–3)

- ▲ ▼ indicates the outcome of the Davis Cup match followed by the score, date, place of event, the zonal classification and its phase, and the court surface.

Result	No.	Rubber	Match type (partner if any)	Opponent nation	Opponent player(s)	Score
▼0–3; 18 November 2019; Caja Mágica, Madrid, Spain; Davis Cup Finals Group B round robin; hard (indoor) surface
Defeat	1	I	Singles	Russia	Andrey Rublev	3–6, 3–6
▼0–3; 20 November 2019; Caja Mágica, Madrid, Spain; Davis Cup Finals Group B round robin; hard (indoor) surface
Defeat	2	II	Singles	Spain	Rafael Nadal	4–6, 3–6
▲3–1; 6-7 March 2020; Dom Sportova, Zagreb, Croatia; Davis Cup qualifying round; hard (indoor) surface
Victory	3	I	Singles	India	Prajnesh Gunneswaran	3–6, 6–4, 6–2
▲3–0; 25 November 2021; Pala Alpitour, Turin, Italy; Davis Cup Final Group D round robin; hard (indoor) surface
Victory	4	I	Singles	Australia	Alexei Popyrin	7–6^{(7–5)}, 7–5
▲2–1; 29 November 2021; Pala Alpitour, Turin, Italy; Davis Cup Finals Quarterfinal; hard (indoor) surface
Victory	5	I	Singles	Italy	Lorenzo Sonego	7–6^{(7–2)}, 2–6, 6–2
▲2–1; 3 December 2021; Madrid Arena, Madrid, Spain; Davis Cup Finals Semifinal; hard (indoor) surface
Victory	6	I	Singles	Serbia	Dušan Lajović	4–6, 6–3, 6–2
▼0–2; 5 December 2021; Madrid Arena, Madrid, Spain; Davis Cup Finals Final; hard (indoor) surface
Defeat	7	I	Singles	Russia	Andrey Rublev	4–6, 6–7^{(5–7)}
▼0–3; 14 September 2022; Unipol Arena, Bologna, Italy; Davis Cup Final Group A round robin; hard (indoor) surface
Defeat	8	I	Singles	Italy	Lorenzo Musetti	4–6, 2–6
▲2–1; 15 September 2022; Unipol Arena, Bologna, Italy; Davis Cup Final Group A round robin; hard (indoor) surface
Defeat	9	I	Singles	Sweden	Elias Ymer	2–6, 6–7^{(2–7)}
▲3–0; 17 September 2022; Unipol Arena, Bologna, Italy; Davis Cup Final Group A round robin; hard (indoor) surface
Victory	10	I	Singles	Argentina	Sebastián Báez	6–1, 3–6, 6–3
▲3–1; 4–5 February 2023; Centar Zamet, Rijeka, Croatia; Davis Cup qualifying round; hard (indoor) surface
Victory	11	II	Singles	Austria	Dominic Thiem	6–3, 7–6^{(7–2)},
▼1–2; 13 September 2023; Arena Gripe, Split, Croatia; Davis Cup Final Group D round robin; hard (indoor) surface
Victory	12	II	Singles	United States	Frances Tiafoe	6–4, 7–6^{(8–6)}
▼1–2; 15 September 2023; Arena Gripe, Split, Croatia; Davis Cup Final Group D round robin; hard (indoor) surface
Defeat	13	II	Singles	Finland	Emil Ruusuvuori	6–7^{(3–7)}, 4–6
▲2–1; 17 September 2023; Arena Gripe, Split, Croatia; Davis Cup Final Group D round robin; hard (indoor) surface
Victory	14	II	Singles	Netherlands	Tallon Griekspoor	4–6, 7–6^{(7–2)}, 6–4
▲4–0; 13–14 September 2024; Varaždin Arena, Varaždin, Croatia; Davis Cup World Group I; hard (indoor) surface
Victory	15	I	Singles	Lithuania	Vilius Gaubas	6–4, 6–2

=== ATP Cup (4–1) ===
Matches by surface Hard (4–1) Clay (0–0) Grass (0–0)	Matches by type Singles (3–0) Mixed Doubles (1–1)

Rubber outcome	No.	Rubber	Match type (partner if any)	Opponent nation	Opponent player(s)	Score
▲8–2; 29 December 2022–3 January 2023; RAC Arena, Perth, Australia; Round robin, Group F; hard surface
Victory	1	IV	Singles	Argentina	Federico Coria	7–6^{(7–5)}, 6–4
Victory	2	V	Mixed Doubles (with Tara Würth)	Argentina	Nadia Podoroska / Tomás Martín Etcheverry	1–6, 6–4, [10–4]
Victory	3	IV	Singles	France	Adrian Mannarino	7–6^{(7–5)}, 3–6, 7–6^{(7–5)}
▼2–3; 4 January 2023; RAC Arena, Perth, Australia; Host city final; hard surface
Victory	4	IV	Singles	Greece	Stefanos Sakellaridis	6–4, 6–2
Defeat	5	V	Mixed Doubles (with Petra Martić)	Greece	Maria Sakkari / Stefanos Tsitsipas	6–7^{(6–8)}, 4–6
