= Alexis Galarneau =

Canadian tennis player

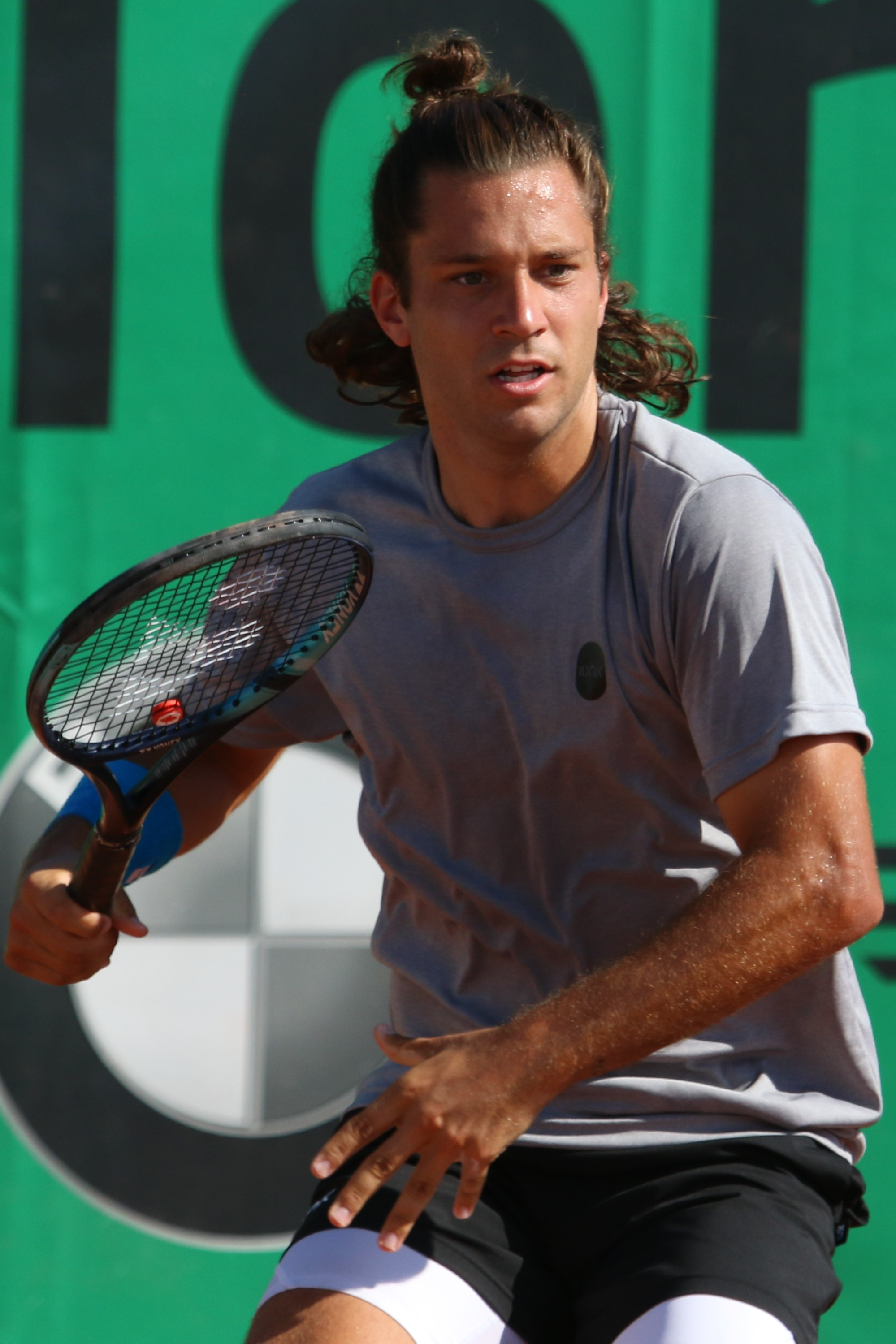
- Galarneau at the 2022 Internationaux de Tennis de Blois
- Country (sports): Canada
- Born: 2 March 1999 (age 27) Laval, Quebec, Canada
- Height: 1.80 m (5 ft 11 in)
- Plays: Right-handed (two-handed backhand)
- College: North Carolina State University
- Prize money: US $1,065,316

Singles
- Career record: 3–9 (at ATP Tour level, Grand Slam level, and in Davis Cup)
- Career titles: 0
- Highest ranking: No. 153 (20 May 2024)
- Current ranking: No. 192 (9 November 2026)

Grand Slam singles results
- Australian Open: Q2 (2023)
- French Open: Q3 (2026)
- Wimbledon: Q2 (2024, 2025, 2026)
- US Open: Q2 (2026)

Doubles
- Career record: 5–9 (at ATP Tour level, Grand Slam level, and in Davis Cup)
- Career titles: 0
- Highest ranking: No. 296 (9 November 2026)
- Current ranking: No. 296 (9 November 2026)

Team competitions
- Davis Cup: W (2022); Record: 5–2
- Last updated on: 9 November 2026.

Alexis Galarneau (pronounced [a.lɛk.si]; born 2 March 1999) is a Canadian tennis player. He has a career-high singles ranking by the ATP of world No. 153 achieved on 20 May 2024 and a career-high doubles ranking of No. 296 achieved on 9 November 2026.

== College career ==
Galarneau played college tennis at North Carolina State University with a deegre in Bacholer of Business Administration .

== Professional career ==
=== 2021–22: Davis Cup champion, ATP debut ===
Galarneau made his ATP main-draw debut at the 2021 National Bank Open after receiving a wildcard into the doubles main draw with partner Félix Auger-Aliassime.

He made his singles debut the following year in 2022, when he lost to 16th seed Grigor Dimitrov in the first round.

Galarneau was part of the Canadian squad which won the 2022 Davis Cup, playing only a doubles match partnering with Vasek Pospisil against Miomir Kecmanović and Filip Krajinović losing by retirement.

=== 2023–25: First ATP Tour win ===
Galarneau received a wildcard into the 2023 Canadian Open, but lost to Francisco Cerúndolo in the first round.

In September 2023 at the 2023 Davis Cup Finals, he defeated Italy's Lorenzo Sonego and Alejandro Tabilo of Chile along with partnering Vasek Pospisil to win all three doubles matches for Canada, helping propel them into the knockout stage.

Given a wildcard entry into the 2025 Canadian Open, Galarneau recorded his first ATP Tour main-draw win against Arthur Rinderknech. He lost in the second round to 13th seed Flavio Cobolli in three sets.

== Performance timeline ==
Key
W	F	SF	QF	#R	RR	Q#	DNQ	A	NH

(W) winner; (F) finalist; (SF) semifinalist; (QF) quarterfinalist; (#R) rounds 4, 3, 2, 1; (RR) round-robin stage; (Q#) qualification round; (DNQ) did not qualify; (A) absent; (NH) not held; (SR) strike rate (events won / competed); (W–L) win–loss record.
To avoid confusion and double counting, these charts are updated at the conclusion of a tournament or when the player's participation has ended.

=== Singles ===
Tournament	2018	2019	…	2022	2023	2024	2025	2026	SR	W–L	Win%
Grand Slam tournaments
Australian Open	A	A	A	A	Q2	A	Q1	Q1	0 / 0	0–0	–
French Open	A	A	A	A	A	Q1	Q1	Q3	0 / 0	0–0	–
Wimbledon	A	A	NH	A	A	Q2	Q2		0 / 0	0–0	–
US Open	A	A	A	A	Q1	A	Q1		0 / 0	0–0	–
Win–loss	0–0	0–0	0–0	0–0	0–0	0–0	0–0	0–0	0 / 0	0–0	–
ATP Masters 1000
Indian Wells	A	A	NH	A	A	A	Q2	1R	0 / 1	0–1	0%
Miami Open	A	A	NH	A	A	A	Q1		0 / 0	0–0	–
Canadian Open	Q1	Q1	NH	1R	1R	Q2	2R	1R	0 / 4	1–4	20%
Cincinnati Open	A	A	A	A	A	A	A		0 / 0	0–0	–
Win–loss	0–0	0–0	0–0	0–1	0–1	0–0	1–1	0–2	0 / 5	1–5	17%

== ATP Challenger and ITF Tour finals ==
=== Singles: 9 (2–7) ===
Legend (singles) ATP Challenger Tour (1–5) Futures/ITF World Tennis Tour (1–2)	Finals by surface Hard (2–6) Clay (0–1)

Result	W–L	Date	Tournament	Tier	Surface	Opponent	Score
Loss	0–1	Jul 2018	Canada F4, Kelowna	Futures	Hard	(United States) JC Aragone	2–6, 3–6
Win	1–1	Nov 2020	M15 Fayetteville, United States	World Tennis Tour	Hard	(Ecuador) Roberto Quiroz	6–2, 6–1
Loss	1–2	Jul 2022	Winnipeg, Canada	Challenger	Hard	(Ecuador) Emilio Gómez	3–6, 6–7^{(4–7)}
Win	2–2	Jul 2023	Granby, Canada	Challenger	Hard	(Australia) Philip Sekulic	6–4, 3–6, 6–3
Loss	2–3	Sep 2023	Columbus, United States	Challenger	Hard	(United States) Denis Kudla	2–6, 1–6
Loss	2–4	Apr 2024	Ciudad de México, Mexico	Challenger	Clay	(Argentina) Thiago Agustín Tirante	1–6, 3–6
Loss	2–5	Nov 2024	M25 Saint-Augustin-de-Desmaures, Canada	World Tennis Tour	Hard (i)	(Canada) Liam Draxl	1–6, 3–6
Loss	2–6	Feb 2026	Baton Rouge, United States	Challenger	Hard (i)	(United States) Stefan Dostanic	4–6, 1–6
Loss	2–7	Feb 2026	Metepec, Mexico	Challenger	Hard	(Croatia) Borna Gojo	1–6, 4–6

=== Doubles: 3 (1–2) ===
Legend (doubles) ATP Challenger Tour (0–1) Futures/ITF World Tennis Tour (1–1)	Finals by surface Hard (1–2) Clay (0–0)

Result	W–L	Date	Tournament	Tier	Surface	Partner	Opponents	Score
Win	1–0	Jun 2018	Canada F3, Calgary	Futures	Hard	(Canada) Benjamin Sigouin	(United States) Alexios Halebian (Canada) Samuel Monette	7–5, 7–6^{(7–4)}
Loss	1–1	Jul 2018	Canada F5, Saskatoon	Futures	Hard	(Canada) Benjamin Sigouin	(Switzerland) Marc-Andrea Hüsler (Netherlands) Sem Verbeek	3–6, 3–6
Loss	1–2	Jun 2023	Little Rock, United States	Challenger	Hard	(United States) Nicolas Moreno de Alboran	(South Korea) Nam Ji-sung (New Zealand) Artem Sitak	4–6, 4–6
