= 2026 Lincoln Challenger – Singles =

Singles
- 2026 Lincoln Challenger

Final
- Champion: (Australia) Bernard Tomic
- Runner-up: (Estonia) Mark Lajal
- Score: 4–6, 7–6^{(7–4)}, 7–6^{(7–3)}

Events
| Singles | Doubles |
- Lincoln Challenger

Rafael Jódar was the defending champion but chose not to defend his title.

Bernard Tomic won the title after defeating Mark Lajal 4–6, 7–6^{(7–4)}, 7–6^{(7–3)} in the final.

== Seeds ==
1. (Australia) Adam Walton (withdrew)
2. (China) Bu Yunchaokete (semifinals)
3. (Hong Kong) Coleman Wong (quarterfinals)
4. (Tunisia) Moez Echargui (first round)
5. (Estonia) Mark Lajal (final)
6. (United States) Colton Smith (quarterfinals)
7. (Switzerland) Rémy Bertola (first round)
8. (Australia) Bernard Tomic (champion)

== Draw ==
Key

- Q = Qualifier
- WC = Wild card
- LL = Lucky loser
- Alt = Alternate
- ITF = ITF entry
- PR = Protected ranking
- SR = Special ranking
- SE = Special exempt
- JE = Junior exempt
- JR = Junior Accelerator Programme entrant
- CO = College Accelerator Programme entrant
- NG = Next Gen Accelerator Program entrant
- w/o = Walkover
- r = Retired
- d = Defaulted

=== Finals ===
Semifinals
8 | (Australia) Bernard Tomic | 6^{5} | 6 | 6
WC | (United States) Spencer Johnson | 7^{7} | 3 | 2
5 | (Estonia) Mark Lajal | 2 | 6 | 7^{8}
2 | (China) Bu Yunchaokete | 6 | 1 | 6^{6}

Final
8 | (Australia) Bernard Tomic | 4 | 7^{7} | 7^{7}
5 | (Estonia) Mark Lajal | 6 | 6^{4} | 6^{3}

=== Top half ===
First round
Q | (United States) M Forbes | 6 | 4 | 6
CO | (United States) S Gorzny | 3 | 6 | 4
Alt | (China) J Cui | 6 | 6
Q | (Australia) T Fancutt | 3 | 4
Alt | (Japan) M Imamura | 4 | 6^{6}
(Australia) J McCabe | 6 | 7^{8}
(United States) Dar Blanch | 4 | 7^{9} | 3
8 | (Australia) B Tomic | 6 | 6^{7} | 6
3 | (Hong Kong) C Wong | 6 | 6
(Chinese Taipei) T-l Wu | 2 | 2
(United States) J Kennedy | 4 | 6 | 3
WC | (New Zealand) Anton Shepp | 6 | 2 | 6
WC | (United States) JJ Wolf | 6^{11} | 4
Alt | (United States) A Fenty | 7^{13} | 1^{r}
WC | (United States) Spencer Johnson | 6 | 6
7 | (Switzerland) R Bertola | 1 | 4

Second round
Q | (United States) M Forbes | 6^{3} | 7^{7} | 6
Alt | (China) J Cui | 7^{7} | 6^{4} | 3
(Australia) J McCabe | 6^{2} | 4
8 | (Australia) B Tomic | 7^{7} | 6
3 | (Hong Kong) C Wong | 7 | 7^{7}
WC | (New Zealand) A Shepp | 5 | 6^{5}
WC | (United States) JJ Wolf | 2 | 4
WC | (United States) S Johnson | 6 | 6

Quarterfinals
Q | (United States) M Forbes | 6^{1} | 3
8 | (Australia) B Tomic | 7^{7} | 6
3 | (Hong Kong) C Wong | 3 | 6^{2}
WC | (United States) S Johnson | 6 | 7^{7}

Semifinals
8 | (Australia) B Tomic | 6^{5} | 6 | 6
WC | (United States) S Johnson | 7^{7} | 3 | 2

=== Bottom half ===
First round
5 | (Estonia) M Lajal | 5 | 7^{7} | 6
CO | (United States) T Svajda | 7 | 6^{5} | 3
(United States) M Krueger | 6 | 7
(Spain) Àlex Martínez | 2 | 5
(Japan) R Noguchi | 6 | 4 | 7
(United Kingdom) C Broom | 2 | 6 | 5
Q | (India) D Suresh | 4 | 7^{7} | 7^{7}
4 | (Tunisia) M Echargui | 6 | 6^{2} | 6^{4}
6 | (United States) C Smith | 4 | 6 | 7^{7}
(United States) Andre Ilagan | 6 | 3 | 6^{5}
(Japan) H Matsuoka | 7 | 6
LL | (Japan) H Moriya | 5 | 3
Q | (United States) Christian Langmo | 1 | 4
Q | (China) Y Wu | 6 | 6
Q | (United States) E Zhu | 6 | 6^{4} | 6^{8}
2 | (China) Y Bu | 4 | 7^{7} | 7^{10}

Second round
5 | (Estonia) M Lajal | 6 | 3
(United States) M Krueger | 2 | 1^{r}
(Japan) R Noguchi | 6 | 6
Q | (India) D Suresh | 4 | 0
6 | (United States) C Smith | 6 | 7
(Japan) H Matsuoka | 3 | 5
Q | (China) Y Wu | 4 | 4
2 | (China) Y Bu | 6 | 6

Quarterfinals
5 | (Estonia) M Lajal | 6 | 6
(Japan) R Noguchi | 4 | 4
6 | (United States) C Smith | 7^{7} | 3 | 4
2 | (China) Y Bu | 6^{1} | 6 | 6

Semifinals
5 | (Estonia) M Lajal | 2 | 6 | 7^{8}
2 | (China) Y Bu | 6 | 1 | 6^{6}
