= 2024 Lincoln Challenger – Doubles =

Doubles
- 2024 Lincoln Challenger

Final
- Champions: (United States) Robert Cash (United States) JJ Tracy
- Runners-up: (Uruguay) Ariel Behar (United Kingdom) Luke Johnson
- Score: 7–6^{(8–6)}, 6–3

Events
| Singles | Doubles |
| Lincoln Challenger | · 2025 → |

This was the first edition of the tournament.

Robert Cash and JJ Tracy won the title after defeating Ariel Behar and Luke Johnson 7–6^{(8–6)}, 6–3 in the final.

== Seeds ==
1. (Uruguay) Ariel Behar / (United Kingdom) Luke Johnson (final)
2. (United States) Vasil Kirkov / (United States) Reese Stalder (first round)
3. (India) Anirudh Chandrasekar / (India) Niki Kaliyanda Poonacha (semifinals)
4. (United States) George Goldhoff / (United States) Christian Harrison (quarterfinals)

== Draw ==
=== Key ===
- Q = Qualifier
- WC = Wild card
- LL = Lucky loser
- Alt = Alternate
- SE = Special exempt
- PR = Protected ranking
- ITF = ITF entry
- JE = Junior exempt
- w/o = Walkover
- r = Retired
- d = Defaulted
- SR = Special ranking

=== Draw ===
First round
1 | (Uruguay) A Behar (United Kingdom) L Johnson | 6 | 6
WC | (New Zealand) Anton Shepp (Spain) Joan Torres Espinosa | 0 | 0
(India) RC Bollipalli (Mexico) H Hach Verdugo | 6^{3} | 6 | [14]
(United States) M Kiger (Australia) C Puttergill | 7^{7} | 4 | [12]
3 | (India) A Chandrasekar (India) N Kaliyanda Poonacha | 3 | 6 | [10]
(United States) O Baris (United States) N Basavareddy | 6 | 3 | [5]
(United States) A Lawson (United States) E Quinn | 6 | 6
(United States) T Boyer (Australia) A Taylor | 4 | 4
(United States) R Cash (United States) JJ Tracy | 6 | 6
(France) H Mayot (France) L Van Assche | 4 | 3
WC | (United States) Henry Bilicic; Nikolay Sysoev | 2 | 6^{4}
4 | (United States) G Goldhoff (United States) C Harrison | 6 | 7^{7}
(United Kingdom) J Fearnley (Hong Kong) C Wong | 6 | 6
(Estonia) Johannes Seeman (United States) Wally Thayne | 3 | 4
(Japan) Ryuki Matsuda (Canada) K Stevenson | 1 | 6 | [10]
2 | (United States) V Kirkov (United States) R Stalder | 6 | 4 | [8]

Quarterfinals
1 | (Uruguay) A Behar (United Kingdom) L Johnson | 7^{10} | 6
(India) RC Bollipalli (Mexico) H Hach Verdugo | 6^{8} | 2
3 | (India) A Chandrasekar (India) N Kaliyanda Poonacha | 6 | 6^{4} | [10]
(United States) A Lawson (United States) E Quinn | 2 | 7^{7} | [7]
(United States) R Cash (United States) JJ Tracy | 4 | 6 | [13]
4 | (United States) G Goldhoff (United States) C Harrison | 6 | 4 | [11]
(United Kingdom) J Fearnley (Hong Kong) C Wong
(Japan) R Matsuda (Canada) K Stevenson | w/o

Semifinals
1 | (Uruguay) A Behar (United Kingdom) L Johnson | 6 | 7^{7}
3 | (India) A Chandrasekar (India) N Kaliyanda Poonacha | 4 | 6^{1}
(United States) R Cash (United States) JJ Tracy | 6 | 6
(Japan) R Matsuda (Canada) K Stevenson | 3 | 3

Final
1 | (Uruguay) A Behar (United Kingdom) L Johnson | 6^{6} | 3
(United States) R Cash (United States) JJ Tracy | 7^{8} | 6
