= 2025 Lincoln Challenger – Doubles =

Doubles
- 2025 Lincoln Challenger

Final
- Champions: (Australia) Patrick Harper (United Kingdom) Johannus Monday
- Runners-up: (India) Aryan Shah (India) Dhakshineswar Suresh
- Score: 6–4, 7–5

Events
Singles	Doubles
- Lincoln Challenger

Robert Cash and JJ Tracy were the defending champions but chose not to defend their title.

Patrick Harper and Johannus Monday won the title after defeating Aryan Shah and Dhakshineswar Suresh 6–4, 7–5 in the final.

== Seeds ==
1. (India) Siddhant Banthia / (Mexico) Hans Hach Verdugo (first round)
2. (Australia) Patrick Harper / (United Kingdom) Johannus Monday (champions)
3. (United States) Benjamin Kittay / (United States) Joshua Sheehy (first round)
4. (United States) Pranav Kumar / (Australia) Kody Pearson (first round)

== Draw ==
Key

- Q = Qualifier
- WC = Wild card
- LL = Lucky loser
- Alt = Alternate
- ITF = ITF entry
- PR = Protected ranking
- SR = Special ranking
- SE = Special exempt
- JE = Junior exempt
- JR = Junior Accelerator Programme entrant
- CO = College Accelerator Programme entrant
- NG = Next Gen Accelerator Program entrant
- w/o = Walkover
- r = Retired
- d = Defaulted

=== Draw ===
First round
1	(India) S Banthia (Mexico) H Hach Verdugo	7	3	[4]
(United States) M Damm (United States) A Rybakov	5	6	[10]
(United States) A Perez (United States) Jamie Vance	7	7
Alt	(United States) C Kingsley (Canada) D Martin	5	5
3	(United States) B Kittay (United States) J Sheehy	6^{3}	5
Alt	(India) Aryan Shah (India) D Suresh	7^{7}	7
WC	(United States) A Ganesan (United States) K Poling	2	3
(Antigua and Barbuda) J Maginley (United Kingdom) J Pinnington Jones	6	6
(United States) Zachary Fuchs (United States) Wally Thayne	6	7^{7}
Alt	(United States) Henry Barrett (United States) B Battistone	2	6^{4}
(Venezuela) Juan José Bianchi (Venezuela) B Pérez	6	2	[13]
4	(United States) P Kumar (Australia) K Pearson	3	6	[11]
(Canada) N Arseneault (France) A Ghibaudo	6^{5}	6	[10]
(United States) A Fenty (United States) N Schachter	7^{7}	0	[8]
WC	(United States) Henry Bilicic (Australia) Henry Lamchinniah	6^{5}	1
2	(Australia) P Harper (United Kingdom) J Monday	7^{7}	6

Quarterfinals
(United States) M Damm (United States) A Rybakov	6	6
(United States) A Perez (United States) Jam Vance	3	2
Alt	(India) A Shah (India) D Suresh	6	6
(Antigua and Barbuda) J Maginley (United Kingdom) J Pinnington Jones	4	3
(United States) Z Fuchs (United States) W Thayne	7^{7}	2	[10]
(Venezuela) JJ Bianchi (Venezuela) B Pérez	6^{4}	6	[12]
(Canada) N Arseneault (France) A Ghibaudo	3	1
2	(Australia) P Harper (United Kingdom) J Monday	6	6

Semifinals
(United States) M Damm (United States) A Rybakov	6^{4}	5
Alt	(India) A Shah (India) D Suresh	7^{7}	7
(Venezuela) JJ Bianchi (Venezuela) B Pérez	2	2
2	(Australia) P Harper (United Kingdom) J Monday	6	6

Final
Alt	(India) A Shah (India) D Suresh	4	5
2	(Australia) P Harper (United Kingdom) J Monday	6	7
