= 2026 Lincoln Challenger =

- Date: 13 – 19 July
- Edition: 3rd
- Surface: Hard
- Location: Lincoln, Nebraska, United States

Champions

Singles
- (Australia) Bernard Tomic

Doubles
- (United States) Nathaniel Lammons / (United States) Jackson Withrow
- Lincoln Challenger

The 2026 Lincoln Challenger was a professional tennis tournament played on hardcourts. It was the third edition of the tournament which was part of the 2026 ATP Challenger Tour. It took place in Lincoln, Nebraska, United States between July 13 and 19, 2026.

== Singles main-draw entrants ==
=== Seeds ===
Country	Player	Rank^{1}	Seed
~~AUS~~	~~Adam Walton~~	~~85~~	~~1~~
CHN	Bu Yunchaokete	107	2
HKG	Coleman Wong	108	3
TUN	Moez Echargui	157	4
EST	Mark Lajal	164	5
USA	Colton Smith	186	6
SUI	Rémy Bertola	187	7
AUS	Bernard Tomic	204	8

- ^{1} Rankings are as of June 29, 2026.

=== Other entrants ===
The following players received wildcards into the singles main draw:

- (United States) Spencer Johnson
- (New Zealand) Anton Shepp
- (United States) J. J. Wolf

The following players received entry into the singles main draw through the College Accelerator programme:

- (United States) Sebastian Gorzny
- (United States) Trevor Svajda

The following players received entry into the singles main draw as alternates:

- (China) Cui Jie
- (United States) Andrew Fenty
- (Japan) Masamichi Imamura

The following players received entry from the qualifying draw:

- (Australia) Thomas Fancutt
- (United States) Matthew Forbes
- (United States) Christian Langmo
- (India) Dhakshineswar Suresh
- (China) Wu Yibing
- (United States) Evan Zhu

The following player received entry as a lucky loser:

- (Japan) Hiroki Moriya

== Champions ==
=== Singles ===
- (Australia) Bernard Tomic def. (Estonia) Mark Lajal 4–6, 7–6^{(7–4)}, 7–6^{(7–3)}.

=== Doubles ===
- (United States) Nathaniel Lammons / (United States) Jackson Withrow def. (United States) George Goldhoff / (Canada) Cleeve Harper 6–3, 6–3.
