= 2026 Lincoln Challenger – Doubles =

Doubles
- 2026 Lincoln Challenger

Final
- Champions: (United States) Nathaniel Lammons (United States) Jackson Withrow
- Runners-up: (United States) George Goldhoff (Canada) Cleeve Harper
- Score: 6–3, 6–3

Events
Singles	Doubles
- Lincoln Challenger

Patrick Harper and Johannus Monday were the defending champions but only Harper chose to defend his title, partnering Blake Bayldon. They lost in the semifinals to George Goldhoff and Cleeve Harper.

Nathaniel Lammons and Jackson Withrow won the title after defeating Goldhoff and Harper 6–3, 6–3 in the final.

== Seeds ==
1. (United States) George Goldhoff / (Canada) Cleeve Harper (final)
2. (United States) Nathaniel Lammons / (United States) Jackson Withrow (champions)
3. (Australia) Blake Bayldon / (Australia) Patrick Harper (semifinals)
4. (Venezuela) Luis David Martínez / (United States) Joshua Sheehy (semifinals)

== Draw ==
Key

- Q = Qualifier
- WC = Wild card
- LL = Lucky loser
- Alt = Alternate
- ITF = ITF entry
- PR = Protected ranking
- SR = Special ranking
- SE = Special exempt
- JE = Junior exempt
- JR = Junior Accelerator Programme entrant
- CO = College Accelerator Programme entrant
- NG = Next Gen Accelerator Program entrant
- w/o = Walkover
- r = Retired
- d = Defaulted

First round
1	(United States) G Goldhoff (Canada) C Harper	6	6
(China) J Cui (Japan) H Matsuoka	3	3
(United States) A Ayeni (United States) K Chopra	6	6
Alt	(United States) Andre Ilagan (United States) E Zhu	3	2
3	(Australia) B Bayldon (Australia) P Harper	7	6
(United States) Zachary Fuchs (United States) Wally Thayne	5	4
(Australia) T Fancutt (New Zealand) A Rai	6	6^{2}	[6]
(Japan) M Imamura (Japan) R Noguchi	3	7^{7}	[10]
(Venezuela) B Pérez (United States) Q Vandecasteele	6^{3}	6	[8]
(United Kingdom) C Broom (United Kingdom) B Jones	7^{7}	4	[10]
WC	(United States) Henry Bilicic (New Zealand) Anton Shepp	2	3
4	(Venezuela) LD Martínez (United States) J Sheehy	6	6
(Switzerland) R Bertola (Tunisia) M Echargui	w/o
(United States) T Hilderbrand (United States) M Krueger
(India) S Myneni (India) D Suresh	2	2
2	(United States) N Lammons (United States) J Withrow	6	6

Quarterfinals
1	(United States) G Goldhoff (Canada) C Harper	7^{9}	6
(United States) A Ayeni (United States) K Chopra	6^{7}	3
3	(Australia) B Bayldon (Australia) P Harper	7^{7}	7^{7}
(Japan) M Imamura (Japan) R Noguchi	6^{5}	6^{3}
(United Kingdom) C Broom (United Kingdom) B Jones	6	4	[8]
4	(Venezuela) LD Martínez (United States) J Sheehy	4	6	[10]
(Switzerland) R Bertola (Tunisia) M Echargui	4	6^{5}
2	(United States) N Lammons (United States) J Withrow	6	7^{7}

Semifinals
1	(United States) G Goldhoff (Canada) C Harper	6	6
3	(Australia) B Bayldon (Australia) P Harper	3	2
4	(Venezuela) LD Martínez (United States) J Sheehy	3	4
2	(United States) N Lammons (United States) J Withrow	6	6

Final
1	(United States) G Goldhoff (Canada) C Harper	3	3
2	(United States) N Lammons (United States) J Withrow	6	6
