= 2025 Lincoln Challenger – Singles =

Singles
- 2025 Lincoln Challenger

Final
- Champion: (Spain) Rafael Jódar
- Runner-up: (United States) Martin Damm
- Score: 6–7^{(3–7)}, 6–3, 6–3

Events
Singles	Doubles
- Lincoln Challenger

Jacob Fearnley was the defending champion but chose not to defend his title.

Rafael Jódar won the title after defeating Martin Damm 6–7^{(3–7)}, 6–3, 6–3 in the final.

== Seeds ==
1. (United States) Brandon Holt (quarterfinals)
2. (United States) Murphy Cassone (first round)
3. (United Kingdom) Jack Pinnington Jones (second round)
4. (United States) Patrick Kypson (semifinals)
5. (Lebanon) Benjamin Hassan (first round)
6. (Kazakhstan) Dmitry Popko (first round)
7. (United Kingdom) Johannus Monday (semifinals)
8. (United States) Martin Damm (final)

== Draw ==
Key

- Q = Qualifier
- WC = Wild card
- LL = Lucky loser
- Alt = Alternate
- ITF = ITF entry
- PR = Protected ranking
- SR = Special ranking
- SE = Special exempt
- JE = Junior exempt
- JR = Junior Accelerator Programme entrant
- CO = College Accelerator Programme entrant
- NG = Next Gen Accelerator Program entrant
- w/o = Walkover
- r = Retired
- d = Defaulted

=== Finals ===
Semifinals
(Spain) Rafael Jódar	6	6
4	(United States) Patrick Kypson	3	3
7	(United Kingdom) Johannus Monday	4	4
8/WC	(United States) Martin Damm	6	6

Final
(Spain) Rafael Jódar	6^{3}	6	6
8/WC	(United States) Martin Damm	7^{7}	3	3

=== Top half ===
First round
1	(United States) B Holt	4	6	4
(India) Aryan Shah	6	4	1^{r}
Q	(United States) K Smith	6	6
WC	(Finland) Jeri Lassila	3	2
(Spain) R Jódar	6	7
Q	(United States) C Kingsley	3	5
Q	(Germany) M Wiskandt	6	6
5	(Lebanon) B Hassan	3	4
4	(United States) P Kypson	6	6
(Germany) M Rosenkranz	2	4
Alt	(United States) S Banerjee	7	3	7^{7}
Q	(United States) A Ganesan	5	6	6^{4}
CO	(India) D Suresh	6	6
(United States) A Rybakov	4	4
(United States) A Perez	6	6
6	(Kazakhstan) D Popko	4	4

Second round
1	(United States) B Holt	3	6	6
Q	(United States) K Smith	6	2	1
(Spain) R Jódar	6	6
Q	(Germany) M Wiskandt	4	1
4	(United States) P Kypson	6	7^{7}
Alt	(United States) S Banerjee	4	6^{5}
CO	(India) D Suresh	6	7^{7}
(United States) A Perez	4	6^{5}

Quarterfinals
1	(United States) B Holt	0	5
(Spain) R Jódar	6	7
4	(United States) P Kypson	7^{7}	6
CO	(India) D Suresh	6^{4}	0

Semifinals
(Spain) R Jódar	6	6
4	(United States) P Kypson	3	3

=== Bottom half ===
First round
7	(United Kingdom) J Monday	6	6
(United States) T Zink	4	4
WC	(Germany) Sydney Zick	3	6^{3}
Alt	(France) A Ghibaudo	6	7^{7}
(Sweden) O Wallin	4	2
(United States) M Mmoh	6	6
(United States) M Krueger	6^{6}	1
3	(United Kingdom) J Pinnington Jones	7^{8}	6
8/WC	(United States) M Damm	4	7^{7}	6
Q	(Canada) N Arseneault	6	6^{4}	4
CO	(Japan) JD Friend	4	0
(United Kingdom) O Tarvet	6	6
Q	(United States) A Fenty	3	3
(United States) A Martin	6	6
(United States) Andre Ilagan	1	6	6
2	(United States) M Cassone	6	2	3

Second round
7	(United Kingdom) J Monday	6	6
Alt	(France) A Ghibaudo	4	2
(United States) M Mmoh	6	7^{7}
3	(United Kingdom) J Pinnington Jones	3	6^{4}
8/WC	(United States) M Damm	7	7
(United Kingdom) O Tarvet	5	5
(United States) A Martin	6^{1}	2
(United States) A Ilagan	7^{7}	6

Quarterfinals
7	(United Kingdom) J Monday	6	6
(United States) M Mmoh	3	3
8/WC	(United States) M Damm	4	6	7^{7}
(United States) A Ilagan	6	3	6^{4}

Semifinals
7	(United Kingdom) J Monday	4	4
8/WC	(United States) M Damm	6	6
