= 2024 Lincoln Challenger – Singles =

Singles
- 2024 Lincoln Challenger

Final
- Champion: (United Kingdom) Jacob Fearnley
- Runner-up: (Hong Kong) Coleman Wong
- Score: 6–4, 6–2

Events
Singles	Doubles
Lincoln Challenger	· 2025 →

This was the first edition of the tournament.

Jacob Fearnley won the title after defeating Coleman Wong 6–4, 6–2 in the final.

== Seeds ==
1. (United States) Christopher Eubanks (second round)
2. (Monaco) Valentin Vacherot (withdrew)
3. (France) Harold Mayot (second round)
4. (France) Luca Van Assche (second round)
5. (China) Bu Yunchaokete (semifinals)
6. (United States) Emilio Nava (first round)
7. (Kazakhstan) Denis Yevseyev (first round)
8. (Croatia) Borna Gojo (first round)

== Draw ==
=== Key ===
- Q = Qualifier
- WC = Wild card
- LL = Lucky loser
- Alt = Alternate
- SE = Special exempt
- PR = Protected ranking
- ITF = ITF entry
- JE = Junior exempt
- w/o = Walkover
- r = Retired
- d = Defaulted
- SR = Special ranking

=== Finals ===
Semifinals
(United Kingdom) Jacob Fearnley	0	6	7^{7}
5	(China) Bu Yunchaokete	6	0	6^{3}
Alt	(United States) Nishesh Basavareddy	7^{7}	6^{3}	0
(Hong Kong) Coleman Wong	6^{5}	7^{7}	6

Final
(United Kingdom) Jacob Fearnley	6	6
(Hong Kong) Coleman Wong	4	2

=== Top half ===
First round
1	(United States) C Eubanks	7^{7}	6
Q	(United States) E Spizzirri	6^{3}	4
(United Kingdom) J Fearnley	6	6
(Netherlands) G Brouwer	1	1
WC	(Canada) Joshua Lapadat	0	0
Q	(United States) C Smith	6	6
Alt	(United States) A Mayo	7^{7}	6
8	(Croatia) B Gojo	6^{5}	1
3	(France) H Mayot	6	6
(United States) M Krueger	3	4
(United States) T Boyer	5	6^{0}
(Australia) T Schoolkate	7	7^{7}
WC	(New Zealand) Anton Shepp	4	2
(Kazakhstan) B Zhukayev	6	6
LL	(Japan) S Mochizuki	4	2
5	(China) Y Bu	6	6

Second round
1	(United States) C Eubanks	5	6	2
(United Kingdom) J Fearnley	7	4	6
Q	(United States) C Smith	3	6^{3}
Alt	(United States) A Mayo	6	7^{7}
3	(France) H Mayot	1	4
(Australia) T Schoolkate	6	6
(Kazakhstan) B Zhukayev	3	2
5	(China) Y Bu	6	6

Quarterfinals
(United Kingdom) J Fearnley	5	6	6
Alt	(United States) A Mayo	7	4	3
(Australia) T Schoolkate	6^{3}	2
5	(China) Y Bu	7^{7}	6

Semifinals
(United Kingdom) J Fearnley	0	6	7^{7}
5	(China) Y Bu	6	0	6^{3}

=== Bottom half ===
First round
7	(Kazakhstan) D Yevseyev	6^{3}	5
(United States) C Williams	7^{7}	7
Q	(United States) S Kozlov	6	4	2
Alt	(United States) N Basavareddy	2	6	6
(United Kingdom) P Jubb	6	6
WC	(Spain) Joan Torres Espinosa	1	4
Q	(United States) Christian Langmo	1	3
4	(France) L Van Assche	6	6
6	(United States) E Nava	4	2
Q	(United Kingdom) J Pinnington Jones	6	6
(Hong Kong) C Wong	6	6
Alt	(United States) E Quinn	1	3
(Australia) L Tu	6	6
Q	(Japan) Ryuki Matsuda	2	4
(United States) O Baris	1
LL	(Japan) Y Takahashi	0^{r}

Second round
(United States) C Williams	3	0
Alt	(United States) N Basavareddy	6	6
(United Kingdom) P Jubb	6	6
4	(France) L Van Assche	3	1
Q	(United Kingdom) J Pinnington Jones	6	2	4
(Hong Kong) C Wong	1	6	6
(Australia) L Tu	6	5	6
(United States) O Baris	3	7	3

Quarterfinals
Alt	(United States) N Basavareddy	7	6
(United Kingdom) P Jubb	5	3
(Hong Kong) C Wong	7	6
(Australia) L Tu	5	1

Semifinals
Alt	(United States) N Basavareddy	7^{7}	6^{3}	0
(Hong Kong) C Wong	6^{5}	7^{7}	6
