= 2026 Rolex Shanghai Masters – Singles =

Singles
- 2026 Rolex Shanghai Masters

Final
- Champion: (Spain) Alejandro Davidovich Fokina
- Runner-up: (Spain) Rafael Jódar
- Score: 1–6, 7–6^{(7–5)}, 6–4

Details
- Draw: 96 (12 Q / 5 WC )
- Seeds: 32

Events
Singles	Doubles
- Shanghai Masters

Alejandro Davidovich Fokina defeated Rafael Jódar in the final, 1–6, 7–6^{(7–5)}, 6–4 to win the men's singles tennis title at the 2026 Shanghai Masters. He saved a match point (in the third round against Frances Tiafoe) en route to his first ATP Masters 1000 title and third career ATP Tour title. Aged 20 years and 29 days old, Jódar became the youngest Shanghai finalist since the tournament's inception in 2009.

Valentin Vacherot was the defending champion, but lost in the third round to Tommy Paul.

Alexander Zverev guaranteed the year-end No. 1 ranking for the first time in his career by reaching the fourth round.

== Seeds ==
All seeds received a bye into the second round.

1. (Germany) Alexander Zverev (semifinals)
2. (Spain) Carlos Alcaraz (third round)
3. (United States) Ben Shelton (third round)
4. (Canada) Félix Auger-Aliassime (fourth round, retired)
5. Daniil Medvedev (semifinals)
6. (Italy) Flavio Cobolli (second round)
7. (United States) Frances Tiafoe (third round)
8. (France) Arthur Fils (third round)
9. (Australia) Alex de Minaur (quarterfinals)
10. (Serbia) Novak Djokovic (second round)
11. (United States) Taylor Fritz (third round)
12. (Spain) Rafael Jódar (final)
13. (Czech Republic) Jakub Menšík (fourth round)
14. (United States) Learner Tien (third round)
15. (United States) Tommy Paul (quarterfinals)
16. (United States) Brandon Nakashima (third round)
17. (Monaco) Valentin Vacherot (third round)
18. (Italy) Luciano Darderi (second round)
19. (Kazakhstan) Alexander Bublik (fourth round)
20. (Norway) Casper Ruud (quarterfinals)
21. (Argentina) Francisco Cerúndolo (third round)
22. (Czech Republic) Jiří Lehečka (third round)
23. Andrey Rublev (second round)
24. (Italy) Lorenzo Musetti (second round)
25. (Spain) Alejandro Davidovich Fokina (champion)
26. Karen Khachanov (fourth round)
27. (Belgium) Alexander Blockx (second round)
28. (Argentina) Tomás Martín Etcheverry (second round)
29. (Chile) Alejandro Tabilo (second round)
30. (France) Ugo Humbert (second round)
31. (United States) Alex Michelsen (second round)
32. (Peru) Ignacio Buse (second round)

Click on the seed number of a player to go to their draw section.

== Draw ==
Key

- Q = Qualifier
- WC = Wild card
- LL = Lucky loser
- Alt = Alternate
- ITF = ITF entry
- PR = Protected ranking
- SR = Special ranking
- SE = Special exempt
- JE = Junior exempt
- JR = Junior Accelerator Programme entrant
- CO = College Accelerator Programme entrant
- NG = Next Gen Accelerator Program entrant
- w/o = Walkover
- r = Retired
- d = Defaulted

=== Finals ===
Quarterfinals
1	(Germany) Alexander Zverev	6	6
9	(Australia) Alex de Minaur	4	4
(France) Arthur Géa	1^{r}
25	(Spain) Alejandro Davidovich Fokina	4
12	(Spain) Rafael Jódar	4	6	6
20	(Norway) Casper Ruud	6	4	3
5	Daniil Medvedev	6	1	6
15	(United States) Tommy Paul	3	6	3

Semifinals
1	(Germany) Alexander Zverev	7	4	3
25	(Spain) Alejandro Davidovich Fokina	5	6	6
12	(Spain) Rafael Jódar	6	6
5	Daniil Medvedev	3	4

Final
25	(Spain) Alejandro Davidovich Fokina	1	7^{7}	6
12	(Spain) Rafael Jódar	6	6^{5}	4

=== Top half ===
==== Section 1 ====
First round
WC	(China) Y Wu	6	7^{8}
LL	(United States) M Zheng	3	6^{6}
(France) Q Halys	6	7^{7}
Q	(Hong Kong) C Wong	4	6^{5}
WC	(China) Z Zhang	6	6^{3}	2
(Czech Republic) T Macháč	1	7^{7}	6
(United States) A Kovacevic	7^{7}	1	4
(Italy) M Berrettini	6^{3}	6	6

Second round
1	(Germany) A Zverev	6	7^{7}
WC	(China) Y Wu	4	6^{4}
(France) Q Halys	4	7^{11}	6
27	(Belgium) A Blockx	6	6^{9}	4
19	(Kazakhstan) A Bublik	6	7^{7}
(Czech Republic) T Macháč	4	6^{4}
(Italy) M Berrettini	6^{4}	5
16	(United States) B Nakashima	7^{7}	7

Third round
1	(Germany) A Zverev	6	6^{8}	6
(France) Q Halys	4	7^{10}	3
19	(Kazakhstan) A Bublik	6^{7}	6	7^{7}
16	(United States) B Nakashima	7^{9}	3	6^{5}

Fourth round
1	(Germany) A Zverev	7^{8}	4	7^{7}
19	(Kazakhstan) A Bublik	6^{6}	6	6^{1}

==== Section 2 ====
First round
(Slovakia) A Molčan	4	6	6
Q	(Italy) F Cinà	6	1	2
(Argentina) M Trungelliti	3	5
Q	(Japan) R Sakamoto	6	7
(United Kingdom) A Fery	7^{7}	6
(Croatia) M Čilić	6^{2}	1
(France) A Mannarino	6	2
Q	(Georgia (country)) N Basilashvili	3	2^{r}

Second round
9	(Australia) A de Minaur	w/o
(Slovakia) A Molčan
Q	(Japan) R Sakamoto	6	6
23	A Rublev	4	4
26	K Khachanov	7^{8}	6^{5}	7^{7}
(United Kingdom) A Fery	6^{6}	7^{7}	6^{2}
(France) A Mannarino	6	4	6
6	(Italy) F Cobolli	1	6	3

Third round
9	(Australia) A de Minaur	7^{8}	6
Q	(Japan) R Sakamoto	6^{6}	4
26	K Khachanov	6	6
(France) A Mannarino	2	4

Fourth round
9	(Australia) A de Minaur	6	6
26	K Khachanov	3	4

==== Section 3 ====
First round
PR	(Denmark) H Rune	6	6^{5}	4
(Germany) D Altmaier	1	7^{7}	6
(France) A Géa	6^{3}	6	6
(Portugal) J Faria	7^{7}	1	2
(Australia) R Hijikata	5	3
Q	R Safiullin	7	6
WC	(Japan) S Shimabukuro	2	4
(Serbia) M Kecmanović	6	6

Second round
3	(United States) B Shelton	6	7^{8}
(Germany) D Altmaier	3	6^{6}
(France) A Géa	6	3	6
30	(France) U Humbert	4	6	1
21	(Argentina) F Cerúndolo	7^{7}	6
Q	R Safiullin	6^{5}	3
(Serbia) M Kecmanović	3	3
13	(Czech Republic) J Menšík	6	6

Third round
3	(United States) B Shelton	6^{5}	6^{3}
(France) A Géa	7^{7}	7^{7}
21	(Argentina) F Cerúndolo	3	6	2
13	(Czech Republic) J Menšík	6	3	6

Fourth round
(France) A Géa	7^{7}	6
13	(Czech Republic) J Menšík	6^{4}	4

==== Section 4 ====
First round
(Poland) H Hurkacz	6	7^{7}
(Australia) J Duckworth	3	6^{4}
Q	(Italy) M Bellucci	4	6	6^{4}
WC	(China) Y Zhou	6	3	7^{7}
(Spain) J Munar	5	4
(United States) J Brooksby	7	6
(Germany) Y Hanfmann	6^{4}	7^{7}	7^{9}
(Poland) K Majchrzak	7^{7}	6^{3}	6^{7}

Second round
10	(Serbia) N Djokovic	4	3
(Poland) H Hurkacz	6	6
WC	(China) Y Zhou	7^{9}	3	7^{7}
24	(Italy) L Musetti	6^{7}	6	6^{1}
25	(Spain) A Davidovich Fokina	6	6
(United States) J Brooksby	1	3
(Germany) Y Hanfmann	4	4
7	(United States) F Tiafoe	6	6

Third round
(Poland) H Hurkacz	6	3	6
WC	(China) Y Zhou	2	6	3
25	(Spain) A Davidovich Fokina	7^{7}	4	7^{8}
7	(United States) F Tiafoe	6^{4}	6	6^{6}

Fourth round
(Poland) H Hurkacz	6	3	6^{6}
25	(Spain) A Davidovich Fokina	1	6	7^{8}

=== Bottom half ===
==== Section 5 ====
First round
Q	P Kotov	6	7^{7}
(Netherlands) T Griekspoor	4	6^{4}
(Netherlands) B van de Zandschulp	1	6	6
(Spain) D Mérida	6	3	4
(Portugal) N Borges	7^{7}	6
(Argentina) F Díaz Acosta	6^{5}	2
(Argentina) TA Tirante	6	6
(Serbia) H Medjedovic	4	2

Second round
8	(France) A Fils	6	6
Q	P Kotov	3	4
(Netherlands) B van de Zandschulp	6	6
31	(United States) A Michelsen	4	4
22	(Czech Republic) J Lehečka	6	3	6
(Portugal) N Borges	3	6	3
(Argentina) TA Tirante	6	2	3
12	(Spain) R Jódar	4	6	6

Third round
8	(France) A Fils	5	4
(Netherlands) B van de Zandschulp	7	6
22	(Czech Republic) J Lehečka	6	6^{2}	4
12	(Spain) R Jódar	4	7^{7}	6

Fourth round
(Netherlands) B van de Zandschulp	7^{7}	4	2
12	(Spain) R Jódar	6^{4}	6	6

==== Section 6 ====
First round
(Hungary) F Marozsán	3	6^{2}
(United States) Z Svajda	6	7^{7}
(France) L Van Assche	6^{3}	3
WC	(China) Y Bu	7^{7}	6
(Argentina) M Navone	6	5	3
(Spain) P Carreño Busta	4	7	6
(Argentina) C Ugo Carabelli	2	6	7
Q	I Simakin	6	2	5

Second round
14	(United States) L Tien	7	7
(United States) Z Svajda	5	5
WC	(China) Y Bu	1	6^{2}
20	(Norway) C Ruud	6	7^{7}
29	(Chile) A Tabilo	6	6^{2}	4
(Spain) P Carreño Busta	4	7^{7}	6
(Argentina) C Ugo Carabelli	6	6^{1}	5
4	(Canada) F Auger-Aliassime	4	7^{7}	7

Third round
14	(United States) L Tien	4	6^{3}
20	(Norway) C Ruud	6	7^{7}
(Spain) P Carreño Busta	3	6	1
4	(Canada) F Auger-Aliassime	6	4	6

Fourth round
20	(Norway) C Ruud	5
4	(Canada) F Auger-Aliassime	2^{r}

==== Section 7 ====
First round
(Spain) M Landaluce	4	4
(Germany) J-L Struff	6	6
(United Kingdom) C Norrie	3	6	4
Q	(Czech Republic) D Svrčina	6	3	6
Q	(Belgium) K Coppejans	3	5
(Greece) S Tsitsipas	6	7
Q	(Australia) B Tomic	3	1
(Italy) M Arnaldi	6	6

Second round
5	D Medvedev	4	6	6
(Germany) J-L Struff	6	4	3
Q	(Czech Republic) D Svrčina	6	3	7
28	(Argentina) TM Etcheverry	3	6	5
18	(Italy) L Darderi	3	4
(Greece) S Tsitsipas	6	6
(Italy) M Arnaldi	5	4
11	(United States) T Fritz	7	6

Third round
5	D Medvedev	6	6
Q	(Czech Republic) D Svrčina	2	3
(Greece) S Tsitsipas	3	7	6
11	(United States) T Fritz	6	5	3

Fourth round
5	D Medvedev	6	7
(Greece) S Tsitsipas	4	5

==== Section 8 ====
First round
(Paraguay) AD Vallejo	6	6
(France) V Royer	3	1
(United States) M Giron	6	3	4
(Argentina) S Báez	1	6	6
(Czech Republic) V Kopřiva	3	1
(Belgium) Z Bergs	6	6
(Argentina) JM Cerúndolo	6	6
Q	(Colombia) N Mejía	4	4

Second round
15	(United States) T Paul	6	6
(Paraguay) AD Vallejo	2	2
(Argentina) S Báez	4	6^{5}
17	(Monaco) V Vacherot	6	7^{7}
32	(Peru) I Buse	0	3
(Belgium) Z Bergs	6	6
(Argentina) JM Cerúndolo	3	3
2	(Spain) C Alcaraz	6	6

Third round
15	(United States) T Paul	6	6
17	(Monaco) V Vacherot	4	2
(Belgium) Z Bergs	7	7^{7}
2	(Spain) C Alcaraz	5	6^{4}

Fourth round
15	(United States) T Paul	7^{7}	6
(Belgium) Z Bergs	6^{5}	4

== Seeded players ==
The following are the seeded players. Seedings are based on ATP rankings as of 28 September 2026. Rankings and points before are as of 5 October 2026.

Because the tournament takes place one week later this year, the points defending column also includes results from tournaments which took place during the week of 13 October 2025 (Almaty, Brussels and Stockholm). Shanghai points are shown first in the points defending and points earned columns.

^{‡}	Champion
^{†}	Runner-up

Seed	Rank	Player	Points before	Points defending	Points earned	Points after	Status
1	2	(Germany) Alexander Zverev	9,720	50	400	10,070	Semifinals lost to (Spain) Alejandro Davidovich Fokina [25]
2	3	(Spain) Carlos Alcaraz	5,560	0	50	5,610	Third round lost to (Belgium) Zizou Bergs
3	4	(United States) Ben Shelton	4,680	10	50	4,720	Third round lost to (France) Arthur Géa
4	5	(Canada) Félix Auger-Aliassime	3,890	200+250	100+50	3,590	Fourth round retired against (Norway) Casper Ruud [20]
5	6	Daniil Medvedev	3,860	400+250	400+50	3,660	Semifinals lost to (Spain) Rafael Jódar [12]
6	7	(Italy) Flavio Cobolli	3,680	10+50	10+10	3,640	Second round lost to (France) Adrian Mannarino
7	10	(United States) Frances Tiafoe	3,380	(50)^{∆}	50	3,380	Third round lost to (Spain) Alejandro Davidovich Fokina [25]
8	11	(France) Arthur Fils	3,275	0	50	3,325	Third round lost to (Netherlands) Botic van de Zandschulp
9	9	(Australia) Alex de Minaur	3,430	200	200	3,430	Quarterfinals lost to (Germany) Alexander Zverev [1]
10	8	(Serbia) Novak Djokovic	3,480	400	10	3,090	Second round lost to (Poland) Hubert Hurkacz
11	12	(United States) Taylor Fritz	2,880	50	50	2,880	Third round lost to (Greece) Stefanos Tsitsipas
12	13	(Spain) Rafael Jódar^{†}	2,659	(75)^{Ω}	650	3,234	Runner-up, lost to (Spain) Alejandro Davidovich Fokina [25]
13	15	(Czech Republic) Jakub Menšík	2,445	(45)^{∆}	100	2,500	Fourth round lost to (France) Arthur Géa
14	17	(United States) Learner Tien	2,395	100	50	2,345	Third round lost to (Norway) Casper Ruud [20]
15	18	(United States) Tommy Paul	2,375	0	200	2,575	Quarterfinals lost to Daniil Medvedev [5]
16	19	(United States) Brandon Nakashima	2,335	10	50	2,375	Third round lost to (Kazakhstan) Alexander Bublik [19]
17	14	(Monaco) Valentin Vacherot	2,450	1,020	50	1,480	Third round lost to (United States) Tommy Paul [15]
18	21	(Italy) Luciano Darderi	2,200	50	10	2,160	Second round lost to (Greece) Stefanos Tsitsipas
19	22	(Kazakhstan) Alexander Bublik	2,185	10	100	2,275	Fourth round lost to (Germany) Alexander Zverev [1]
20	24	(Norway) Casper Ruud	2,145	10+250	200+10	2,095	Quarterfinals lost to (Spain) Rafael Jódar [12]
21	20	(Argentina) Francisco Cerúndolo	2,220	50	50	2,220	Third round lost to (Czech Republic) Jakub Menšík [13]
22	16	(Czech Republic) Jiří Lehečka	2,440	100+165	50+10	2,235	Third round lost to (Spain) Rafael Jódar [12]
23	23	Andrey Rublev	2,175	10	10	2,175	Second round lost to (Japan) Rei Sakamoto [Q]
24	25	(Italy) Lorenzo Musetti	2,010	100+50	10+0	1,870	Second round lost to (China) Zhou Yi [WC]
25	26	(Spain) Alejandro Davidovich Fokina^{‡}	1,930	50	1,000	2,930	Champion, defeated (Spain) Rafael Jódar [12]
26	27	Karen Khachanov	1,900	10	100	1,990	Fourth round lost to (Australia) Alex de Minaur [9]
27	28	(Belgium) Alexander Blockx	1,787	(7)^{∆}	10	1,790	Second round vs. (France) Quentin Halys
28	31	(Argentina) Tomás Martín Etcheverry	1,590	0+50	10+40	1,590	Second round lost to (Czech Republic) Dalibor Svrčina [Q]
29	30	(Chile) Alejandro Tabilo	1,605	50	10	1,565	Second round lost to (Spain) Pablo Carreño Busta
30	32	(France) Ugo Humbert	1,575	50+165	10+50	1,420	Second round lost to (France) Arthur Géa
31	35	(United States) Alex Michelsen	1,460	100	10	1,370	Second round lost to (Netherlands) Botic van de Zandschulp
32	36	(Peru) Ignacio Buse	1,447	(12)^{∆}	10	1,445	Second round lost to (Belgium) Zizou Bergs

∆ The player is defending points from his 18th best tournament.
Ω The player is defending points from an ATP Challenger Tour event.

=== Withdrawn seeded players ===
The following players would have been seeded, but withdrew before the tournament began.

Rank	Player	Points before	Points defending	Points after	Withdrawal reason
1	(Italy) Jannik Sinner	11,000	50	10,950	Right knee injury
29	(Brazil) João Fonseca	1,750	0	1,750	Injury

=== Other entry information ===
==== Wildcards ====
- (China) Bu Yunchaokete
- (Japan) Sho Shimabukuro (Note: Initially awarded to Gabriel Diallo.)
- (China) Wu Yibing
- (China) Zhang Zhizhen
- (China) Zhou Yi

==== Protected ranking ====
- (Denmark) Holger Rune

==== Withdrawals ====
- ‡ (Argentina) Román Andrés Burruchaga → replaced by (Argentina) Facundo Díaz Acosta
- ‡ (United Kingdom) Jan Choinski → replaced by (Slovakia) Alex Molčan
- ‡ (Belgium) Raphaël Collignon → replaced by (United States) Marcos Giron
- ‡ (Brazil) João Fonseca → replaced by (United States) Zachary Svajda
- ‡ (United States) Sebastian Korda → replaced by (Serbia) Hamad Medjedovic
- ‡ (France) Corentin Moutet → replaced by (Argentina) Marco Trungelliti
- ‡ (United States) Ethan Quinn → replaced by (Croatia) Marin Čilić
- ‡ (France) Arthur Rinderknech → replaced by (United States) Aleksandar Kovacevic
- † (Canada) Denis Shapovalov → replaced by (United States) Michael Zheng (LL)
- ‡ (Italy) Jannik Sinner → replaced by (Australia) Rinky Hijikata

‡ – withdrew from entry list
† – withdrew from main draw

== Qualifying ==
=== Seeds ===
1. (Italy) Lorenzo Sonego (first round)
2. Roman Safiullin (qualified)
3. (France) Kyrian Jacquet (qualifying competition)
4. (France) Hugo Gaston (first round)
5. (Italy) Mattia Bellucci (qualified)
6. (United States) Michael Zheng (qualifying competition, lucky loser)
7. (Australia) Adam Walton (first round)
8. (France) Térence Atmane (first round, retired)
9. (Hong Kong) Coleman Wong (qualified)
10. (United States) Martin Damm (first round)
11. (Kazakhstan) Alexander Shevchenko (first round)
12. (Australia) Dane Sweeny (qualifying competition)
13. (Australia) Aleksandar Vukic (qualifying competition)
14. (Colombia) Nicolás Mejía (qualified)
15. (Japan) Shintaro Mochizuki (qualifying competition)
16. (Georgia (country)) Nikoloz Basilashvili (qualified)
17. (Czech Republic) Dalibor Svrčina (qualified)
18. (South Africa) Lloyd Harris (qualifying competition)
19. (France) Alexandre Müller (qualifying competition)
20. (Greece) Stefanos Sakellaridis (first round)
21. (Japan) Rei Sakamoto (qualified)
22. (United States) Nishesh Basavareddy (first round)
23. (Italy) Federico Cinà (qualified)
24. Ilia Simakin (qualified)

=== Qualifiers ===
1. (Italy) Federico Cinà
2. Roman Safiullin
3. (Japan) Rei Sakamoto
4. (Georgia (country)) Nikoloz Basilashvili
5. (Italy) Mattia Bellucci
6. (Colombia) Nicolás Mejía
7. Ilia Simakin
8. (Australia) Bernard Tomic
9. (Hong Kong) Coleman Wong
10. Pavel Kotov
11. (Czech Republic) Dalibor Svrčina
12. (Belgium) Kimmer Coppejans

=== Lucky loser ===
1. (United States) Michael Zheng

=== Qualifying draw ===
==== First qualifier ====
First round
1	(Italy) Lorenzo Sonego	6^{5}	7	4
PR	(Tunisia) Aziz Dougaz	7^{7}	5	6
WC	(China) Xiao Linang	6	3	2
23	(Italy) Federico Cinà	2	6	6

Qualifying competition
PR	(Tunisia) Aziz Dougaz	3	6	4
23	(Italy) Federico Cinà	6	4	6

==== Second qualifier ====
First round
2	Roman Safiullin	6	6
(Canada) Alexis Galarneau	3	0
(Japan) Taro Daniel	6	2	2
15	(Japan) Shintaro Mochizuki	2	6	6

Qualifying competition
2	Roman Safiullin	6	6
15	(Japan) Shintaro Mochizuki	2	3

==== Third qualifier ====
First round
3	(France) Kyrian Jacquet	6	7^{7}
WC	(China) Zhang Tianhui	2	6^{1}
PR	(South Korea) Hong Seong-chan	3	5
21	(Japan) Rei Sakamoto	6	7

Qualifying competition
3	(France) Kyrian Jacquet	6^{6}	6	6^{8}
21	(Japan) Rei Sakamoto	7^{8}	4	7^{10}

==== Fourth qualifier ====
First round
4	(France) Hugo Gaston	5	4
(Canada) Liam Draxl	7	6
(United States) Andre Ilagan	3	7^{7}	5
16	(Georgia (country)) Nikoloz Basilashvili	6	6^{1}	7

Qualifying competition
(Canada) Liam Draxl	7	5	4
16	(Georgia (country)) Nikoloz Basilashvili	5	7	6

==== Fifth qualifier ====
First round
5	(Italy) Mattia Bellucci	4	7	7^{7}
(Sweden) Elias Ymer	6	5	6^{3}
(Japan) Rio Noguchi	3	6	1
19	(France) Alexandre Müller	6	4	6

Qualifying competition
5	(Italy) Mattia Bellucci	6	6
19	(France) Alexandre Müller	4	2

==== Sixth qualifier ====
First round
6	(United States) Michael Zheng	6^{7}	6	6
(Argentina) Federico Agustín Gómez	7^{9}	3	3
(Chinese Taipei) Tseng Chun-hsin	4	0^{r}
14	(Colombia) Nicolás Mejía	6	0

Qualifying competition
6	(United States) Michael Zheng	3	4
14	(Colombia) Nicolás Mejía	6	6

==== Seventh qualifier ====
First round
7	(Australia) Adam Walton	7	3	4
WC	(China) Te Rigele	5	6	6
(France) Luka Pavlovic	6	4	1
24	Ilia Simakin	4	6	6

Qualifying competition
WC	(China) Te Rigele	3	2
24	Ilia Simakin	6	6

==== Eighth qualifier ====
First round
8	(France) Térence Atmane	3	6	3^{r}
(Australia) Bernard Tomic	6	4	5
(Kazakhstan) Timofey Skatov	6	6
20	(Greece) Stefanos Sakellaridis	3	2

Qualifying competition
(Australia) Bernard Tomic	7	6
(Kazakhstan) Timofey Skatov	5	4

==== Ninth qualifier ====
First round
9	(Hong Kong) Coleman Wong	6	6
WC	(Australia) Cruz Hewitt	4	1
(Australia) Alex Bolt	5	4
18	(South Africa) Lloyd Harris	7	6

Qualifying competition
9	(Hong Kong) Coleman Wong	6	3	6
18	(South Africa) Lloyd Harris	4	6	2

==== Tenth qualifier ====
First round
10	(United States) Martin Damm	6^{4}	7^{7}	3
Pavel Kotov	7^{7}	6^{4}	6
WC	(China) Cui Jie	6	6^{3}	6^{5}
13	(Australia) Aleksandar Vukic	4	7^{7}	7^{7}

Qualifying competition
Pavel Kotov	6	6
13	(Australia) Aleksandar Vukic	3	3

==== Eleventh qualifier ====
First round
11	(Kazakhstan) Alexander Shevchenko	2	4
(Japan) Yoshihito Nishioka	6	6
(United Kingdom) Billy Harris	6	6^{6}	5
17	(Czech Republic) Dalibor Svrčina	4	7^{8}	7

Qualifying competition
(Japan) Yoshihito Nishioka	2^{r}
17	(Czech Republic) Dalibor Svrčina	5

==== Twelfth qualifier ====
First round
12	(Australia) Dane Sweeny	3	6	6
(Australia) Tristan Schoolkate	6	3	2
(Belgium) Kimmer Coppejans	7^{10}	6
22	(United States) Nishesh Basavareddy	6^{8}	3

Qualifying competition
12	(Australia) Dane Sweeny	3	2
(Belgium) Kimmer Coppejans	6	6
