= 2026 Jiujiang Challenger – Men's doubles =

Men's doubles
- 2026 Jiujiang Challenger

Final
- Champions: (South Korea) Nam Ji-sung (Finland) Patrik Niklas-Salminen
- Runners-up: (Chinese Taipei) Hsu Yu-hsiou (Japan) Seita Watanabe
- Score: 6–4, 6–4

Events
Singles	men	women
Doubles	men	women
- Jiujiang Challenger

This was the first edition of the tournament.

Nam Ji-sung and Patrik Niklas-Salminen won the title after defeating Hsu Yu-hsiou and Seita Watanabe 6–4, 6–4 in the final.

== Seeds ==
1. (Netherlands) Jean-Julien Rojer / (United States) Theodore Winegar (quarterfinals)
2. (Thailand) Pruchya Isaro / (India) Niki Kaliyanda Poonacha (first round, retired)
3. (India) Rithvik Choudary Bollipalli / (India) Arjun Kadhe (quarterfinals)
4. (Netherlands) Thijmen Loof / (Japan) Takeru Yuzuki (first round)

== Draw ==
Key

- Q = Qualifier
- WC = Wild card
- LL = Lucky loser
- Alt = Alternate
- ITF = ITF entry
- PR = Protected ranking
- SR = Special ranking
- SE = Special exempt
- JE = Junior exempt
- JR = Junior Accelerator Programme entrant
- CO = College Accelerator Programme entrant
- NG = Next Gen Accelerator Program entrant
- w/o = Walkover
- r = Retired
- d = Defaulted

First round
1	(Netherlands) J-J Rojer (United States) T Winegar	6	6
(Australia) Ja Delaney (Japan) Y Shimizu	3	4
(Australia) K Pearson (Australia) A Walton	2	4
(Japan) R Noguchi (China) F Sun	6	6
4	(Netherlands) T Loof (Japan) T Yuzuki	4	4
(Chinese Taipei) Y-h Hsu (Japan) S Watanabe	6	6
(Japan) Y Kusuhara (Japan) S Nakagawa	7^{9}	3	[6]
(Chinese Taipei) J Jung (Japan) K Uesugi	6^{7}	6	[10]
(Australia) C Puttergill (Australia) D Sweeny	6	3	[5]
(United Kingdom) B Jones (United Kingdom) J Paris	3	6	[10]
WC	(China) Tian Yuxiang (China) Wei Jiangnan	1	1
3	(India) RC Bollipalli (India) A Kadhe	6	6
(South Korea) J-s Nam (Finland) P Niklas-Salminen	7^{7}	6
PR	(India) S Myneni (India) R Ramanathan	6^{4}	2
WC	(China) J Cui (China) A Wang	6	0
2	(Thailand) P Isaro (India) N Kaliyanda Poonacha	4	0^{r}

Quarterfinals
1	(Netherlands) J-J Rojer (United States) T Winegar	6	4	[10]
(Japan) R Noguchi (China) F Sun	3	6	[12]
(Chinese Taipei) Y-h Hsu (Japan) S Watanabe	7^{7}	7^{7}
(Chinese Taipei) J Jung (Japan) K Uesugi	6^{3}	6^{2}
(United Kingdom) B Jones (United Kingdom) J Paris	6	3	[10]
3	(India) RC Bollipalli (India) A Kadhe	4	6	[5]
(South Korea) J-s Nam (Finland) P Niklas-Salminen	6	6
WC	(China) J Cui (China) A Wang	1	3

Semifinals
(Japan) R Noguchi (China) F Sun	6	0	[4]
(Chinese Taipei) Y-h Hsu (Japan) S Watanabe	3	6	[10]
(United Kingdom) B Jones (United Kingdom) J Paris	6^{8}	3
(South Korea) J-s Nam (Finland) P Niklas-Salminen	7^{10}	6

Final
(Chinese Taipei) Y-h Hsu (Japan) S Watanabe	4	4
(South Korea) J-s Nam (Finland) P Niklas-Salminen	6	6
