= 2026 Jiujiang Challenger – Men's singles =

Men's singles
- 2026 Jiujiang Challenger

Final
- Champion: (Hong Kong) Coleman Wong
- Runner-up: (Australia) Adam Walton
- Score: 7–5, 7–6^{(7–4)}

Events
Singles	men	women
Doubles	men	women
- Jiujiang Challenger

This was the first edition of the tournament.

Coleman Wong won the title after defeating Adam Walton 7–5, 7–6^{(7–4),} in the final, and he is the first man from Hong Kong to win an ATP Challenger title.

== Seeds ==
1. (Japan) Sho Shimabukuro (second round)
2. (Australia) Tristan Schoolkate (first round)
3. (Australia) Adam Walton (final)
4. (Hong Kong) Coleman Wong (champion)
5. (Australia) Dane Sweeny (first round)
6. (Australia) Alex Bolt (semifinals)
7. (China) Bu Yunchaokete (quarterfinals)
8. (Estonia) Mark Lajal (quarterfinals)

== Draw ==
Key

- Q = Qualifier
- WC = Wild card
- LL = Lucky loser
- Alt = Alternate
- ITF = ITF entry
- PR = Protected ranking
- SR = Special ranking
- SE = Special exempt
- JE = Junior exempt
- JR = Junior Accelerator Programme entrant
- CO = College Accelerator Programme entrant
- NG = Next Gen Accelerator Program entrant
- w/o = Walkover
- r = Retired
- d = Defaulted

=== Finals ===
Semifinals
6	(Australia) Alex Bolt	2	6	6^{5}
3	(Australia) Adam Walton	6	3	7^{7}
4	(Hong Kong) Coleman Wong	6	6
(China) Sun Fajing	3	4

Final
3	(Australia) Adam Walton	5	6^{4}
4	(Hong Kong) Coleman Wong	7	7^{7}

=== Top half ===
First round
1	(Japan) S Shimabukuro	6	6
Q	(Japan) Y Shimizu	3	0
(United States) K Smith	7^{7}	4	7^{7}
Q	(Japan) H Matsuoka	6^{4}	6	6^{4}
(United Kingdom) G Hussey	6	3	6
PR	(Chinese Taipei) J Jung	2	6	3
WC	(China) A Wang	3	6^{2}
6	(Australia) A Bolt	6	7^{7}
3	(Australia) A Walton	6	6
WC	(China) J Cui	3	2
Q	(Chinese Taipei) T-l Wu	6	6
WC	(China) R Te	4	1
LL	(Australia) Matthew Dellavedova	4	0
(United Kingdom) L Broady	6	6
(Canada) A Galarneau	4	6	6
5	(Australia) D Sweeny	6	3	4

Second round
1	(Japan) S Shimabukuro	7	0	3
(United States) K Smith	5	6	6
(United Kingdom) G Hussey	2	3
6	(Australia) A Bolt	6	6
3	(Australia) A Walton	5	6	7^{7}
Q	(Chinese Taipei) T-l Wu	7	3	6^{4}
(United Kingdom) L Broady	3	4
(Canada) A Galarneau	6	6

Quarterfinals
(United States) K Smith	6^{5}	6^{5}
6	(Australia) A Bolt	7^{7}	7^{7}
3	(Australia) A Walton	6	6^{5}	7^{7}
(Canada) A Galarneau	1	7^{7}	6^{3}

Semifinals
6	(Australia) A Bolt	2	6	6^{5}
3	(Australia) A Walton	6	3	7^{7}

=== Bottom half ===
First round
7	(China) Y Bu	7^{7}	7^{7}
Q	(Germany) D Masur	6^{5}	6^{5}
Q	(United States) Andre Ilagan	4	6	6
(Australia) J McCabe	6	4	2
(Chinese Taipei) Y-h Hsu	5	2
(Japan) R Noguchi	7	6
(Kazakhstan) M Kukushkin	3	3
4	(Hong Kong) C Wong	6	6
8	(Estonia) M Lajal	6	6
Alt	(Japan) A Santillan	3	2
(Australia) B Tomic	2	4
Q	M Sharipov	6	6
NG	(Serbia) O Milić	6	6^{3}	6
Alt	(Japan) Renta Tokuda	3	7^{7}	1
(China) F Sun	7^{7}	6
2	(Australia) T Schoolkate	6^{3}	2

Second round
7	(China) Y Bu	6	6
Q	(United States) A Ilagan	2	3
(Japan) R Noguchi	6^{2}	2
4	(Hong Kong) C Wong	7^{7}	6
8	(Estonia) M Lajal	6	6
Q	M Sharipov	4	4
NG	(Serbia) O Milić	4	1
(China) F Sun	6	6

Quarterfinals
7	(China) Y Bu	6^{2}	6^{8}
4	(Hong Kong) C Wong	7^{7}	7^{10}
8	(Estonia) M Lajal	6	3	4
(China) F Sun	3	6	6

Semifinals
4	(Hong Kong) C Wong	6	6
(China) F Sun	3	4
