= 2024 Lincoln Challenger =

- Date: 5 – 11 August
- Edition: 1st
- Surface: Hard
- Location: Lincoln, Nebraska, United States

Champions

Singles
- (United Kingdom) Jacob Fearnley

Doubles
- (United States) Robert Cash / (United States) JJ Tracy
- Lincoln Challenger

The 2024 Lincoln Challenger was a professional tennis tournament played on hardcourts. It was the 1st edition of the tournament which was part of the 2024 ATP Challenger Tour. It took place in Lincoln, Nebraska, United States between August 5 and August 11, 2024.

== Singles main-draw entrants ==
=== Seeds ===
Country	Player	Rank^{1}	Seed
USA	Christopher Eubanks	110	1
~~MON~~	~~Valentin Vacherot~~	~~111~~	~~2~~
FRA	Harold Mayot	114	3
FRA	Luca Van Assche	118	4
CHN	Bu Yunchaokete	136	5
USA	Emilio Nava	161	6
KAZ	Denis Yevseyev	166	7
CRO	Borna Gojo	176	8

- ^{1} Rankings are as of 29 July 2024.

=== Other entrants ===
The following players received wildcards into the singles main draw:

- (Canada) Joshua Lapadat
- (New Zealand) Anton Shepp
- (Spain) Joan Torres Espinosa

The following players received entry into the singles main draw as alternates:

- (United States) Nishesh Basavareddy
- (United States) Aidan Mayo
- (United States) Ethan Quinn

The following players received entry from the qualifying draw:

- (United States) Stefan Kozlov
- (United States) Christian Langmo
- (Japan) Ryuki Matsuda
- (United Kingdom) Jack Pinnington Jones
- (United States) Colton Smith
- (United States) Eliot Spizzirri

The following players received entry as lucky losers:

- (Japan) Shintaro Mochizuki
- (Japan) Yusuke Takahashi

== Champions ==
=== Singles ===
- (United Kingdom) Jacob Fearnley def. (Hong Kong) Coleman Wong 6–4, 6–2.

=== Doubles ===
- (United States) Robert Cash / (United States) JJ Tracy def. (Uruguay) Ariel Behar / (United Kingdom) Luke Johnson 7–6^{(8–6)}, 6–3.
