= 2025 Lincoln Challenger =

- Date: 13 – 19 October
- Edition: 2nd
- Surface: Hard
- Location: Lincoln, Nebraska, United States

Champions

Singles
- (Spain) Rafael Jódar

Doubles
- (Australia) Patrick Harper / (United Kingdom) Johannus Monday
- Lincoln Challenger

The 2025 Lincoln Challenger was a professional tennis tournament played on hardcourts. It was the second edition of the tournament which was part of the 2025 ATP Challenger Tour. It took place in Lincoln, Nebraska, United States between October 13 and 19, 2025.

== Singles main-draw entrants ==
=== Seeds ===
Country	Player	Rank^{1}	Seed
USA	Brandon Holt	115	1
USA	Murphy Cassone	176	2
GBR	Jack Pinnington Jones	180	3
USA	Patrick Kypson	184	4
LBN	Benjamin Hassan	187	5
KAZ	Dmitry Popko	214	6
GBR	Johannus Monday	229	7
USA	Martin Damm	242	8

- ^{1} Rankings are as of September 29, 2025.

=== Other entrants ===
The following players received wildcards into the singles main draw:

- (United States) Martin Damm
- (Finland) Jeri Lassila
- (Germany) Sydney Zick

The following players received entry into the singles main draw through the College Accelerator programme:

- (Japan) Jay Dylan Friend
- (India) Dhakshineswar Suresh

The following players received entry into the singles main draw as alternates:

- (United States) Samir Banerjee
- (France) Antoine Ghibaudo

The following players received entry from the qualifying draw:

- (Canada) Nicolas Arseneault
- (United States) Andrew Fenty
- (United States) Adhithya Ganesan
- (United States) Cannon Kingsley
- (United States) Keegan Smith
- (Germany) Max Wiskandt

== Champions ==
=== Singles ===
- (Spain) Rafael Jódar def. (United States) Martin Damm 6–7^{(3–7)}, 6–3, 6–3.

=== Doubles ===
- (Australia) Patrick Harper / (United Kingdom) Johannus Monday def. (India) Aryan Shah / (India) Dhakshineswar Suresh 6–4, 7–5.
