= 2026 Rolex Shanghai Masters – Doubles =

Doubles
- 2026 Rolex Shanghai Masters

Final
- Champions: (Austria) Lucas Miedler (Austria) Neil Oberleitner
- Runners-up: (Portugal) Francisco Cabral (United States) JJ Tracy
- Score: 6–3, 6–4

Details
- Draw: 32 (3 WC)
- Seeds: 8

Events
Singles	Doubles
- Shanghai Masters

Lucas Miedler and Neil Oberleitner defeated Francisco Cabral and JJ Tracy in the final, 6–3, 6–4 to win the doubles tennis title at the 2026 Shanghai Masters. It was the 14th career ATP Tour title for Miedler and second for Oberleitner. They were also the first all-Austrian pair to win a Masters 1000 title.

Kevin Krawietz and Tim Pütz were the defending champions, but lost in the quarterfinals to Théo Arribagé and Albano Olivetti.

== Seeds ==
1. (United States) Christian Harrison / (United Kingdom) Neal Skupski (quarterfinals)
2. (El Salvador) Marcelo Arévalo / (Croatia) Mate Pavić (first round)
3. (Germany) Kevin Krawietz / (Germany) Tim Pütz (quarterfinals)
4. (Italy) Simone Bolelli / (Italy) Andrea Vavassori (first round)
5. (United Kingdom) Julian Cash / (United Kingdom) Lloyd Glasspool (second round)
6. (Argentina) Guido Andreozzi / (France) Manuel Guinard (first round)
7. (Brazil) Orlando Luz / (Brazil) Rafael Matos (first round)
8. (France) Théo Arribagé / (France) Albano Olivetti (semifinals)

== Draw ==
Key

- Q = Qualifier
- WC = Wild card
- LL = Lucky loser
- Alt = Alternate
- ITF = ITF entry
- PR = Protected ranking
- SR = Special ranking
- SE = Special exempt
- JE = Junior exempt
- JR = Junior Accelerator Programme entrant
- CO = College Accelerator Programme entrant
- NG = Next Gen Accelerator Program entrant
- w/o = Walkover
- r = Retired
- d = Defaulted

=== Finals ===
Semifinals
(Germany) Jakob Schnaitter (Germany) Mark Wallner	5	3
(Austria) Lucas Miedler (Austria) Neil Oberleitner	7	6
8	(France) Théo Arribagé (France) Albano Olivetti	6	4	[8]
(Portugal) Francisco Cabral (United States) JJ Tracy	4	6	[10]

Final
(Austria) Lucas Miedler (Austria) Neil Oberleitner	6	6
(Portugal) Francisco Cabral (United States) JJ Tracy	3	4

=== Top half ===
First round
1	(United States) C Harrison (United Kingdom) N Skupski	7^{7}	6
WC	(Monaco) R Arneodo (Mexico) S González	6^{3}	4
PR	(Czech Republic) P Nouza (New Zealand) M Venus	2	4
(Monaco) H Nys (France) É Roger-Vasselin	6	6
(Argentina) F Cerúndolo (Argentina) TA Tirante	5	3
(Germany) J Schnaitter (Germany) M Wallner	7	6
(Peru) I Buse (Paraguay) AD Vallejo	6	6^{7}	[10]
6	(Argentina) G Andreozzi (France) M Guinard	3	7^{9}	[7]
4	(Italy) S Bolelli (Italy) A Vavassori	7^{7}	6^{2}	[7]
(United States) A Krajicek (Croatia) N Mektić	6^{2}	7^{7}	[10]
Alt	(United States) R Cash (Austria) A Erler	6^{8}	5
(Austria) L Miedler (Austria) N Oberleitner	7^{10}	7
(Australia) M Polmans (Poland) J Zieliński	7^{7}	6
WC	(China) F Jiang (China) T Zhang	6^{3}	2
(Italy) L Darderi (Argentina) TM Etcheverry	1	6	[8]
5	(United Kingdom) J Cash (United Kingdom) L Glasspool	6	3	[10]

Second round
1	(United States) C Harrison (United Kingdom) N Skupski	7^{7}	7
(Monaco) H Nys (France) É Roger-Vasselin	6^{1}	5
(Germany) J Schnaitter (Germany) M Wallner	w/o
(Peru) I Buse (Paraguay) AD Vallejo
(United States) A Krajicek (Croatia) N Mektić	3	4
(Austria) L Miedler (Austria) N Oberleitner	6	6
(Australia) M Polmans (Poland) J Zieliński	7^{7}	4	[12]
5	(United Kingdom) J Cash (United Kingdom) L Glasspool	6^{3}	6	[10]

Quarterfinals
1	(United States) C Harrison (United Kingdom) N Skupski	6^{5}	3
(Germany) J Schnaitter (Germany) M Wallner	7^{7}	6
(Austria) L Miedler (Austria) N Oberleitner	7^{7}	6
(Australia) M Polmans (Poland) J Zieliński	6^{5}	4

Semifinals
(Germany) J Schnaitter (Germany) M Wallner	5	3
(Austria) L Miedler (Austria) N Oberleitner	7	6

=== Bottom half ===
First round
8	(France) T Arribagé (France) A Olivetti	6	4	[10]
(Portugal) N Borges (France) S Doumbia	1	6	[7]
I Liutarevich; D Medvedev	6	6
(Kazakhstan) A Bublik (United States) B Shelton	4	3
WC	(China) Z Zhang (China) Y Zhou	6	5	[10]
(Germany) C Frantzen (Netherlands) R Haase	4	7	[7]
(Netherlands) B Stevens (Netherlands) B van de Zandschulp	7^{7}	1	[4]
3	(Germany) K Krawietz (Germany) T Pütz	6^{4}	6	[10]
7	(Brazil) O Luz (Brazil) R Matos	5	7^{8}	[13]
(Portugal) F Cabral (United States) JJ Tracy	7	6^{6}	[15]
Alt	(Netherlands) S Arends (United Kingdom) L Johnson	7^{7}	7^{7}
(Brazil) M Melo (Germany) A Zverev	6^{5}	6^{5}
(Netherlands) D Pel (Chile) A Tabilo	7^{9}	3	[5]
(United States) R Galloway (Sweden) A Göransson	6^{7}	6	[10]
(Czech Republic) A Pavlásek (Czech Republic) P Rikl	7^{7}	6^{3}	[10]
2	(El Salvador) M Arévalo (Croatia) M Pavić	6^{5}	7^{7}	[7]

Second round
8	(France) T Arribagé (France) A Olivetti	w/o
I Liutarevich; D Medvedev
WC	(China) Z Zhang (China) Y Zhou	4	1
3	(Germany) K Krawietz (Germany) T Pütz	6	6
(Portugal) F Cabral (United States) JJ Tracy	7^{8}	6
Alt	(Netherlands) S Arends (United Kingdom) L Johnson	6^{6}	3
(United States) R Galloway (Sweden) A Göransson	6	6
(Czech Republic) A Pavlásek (Czech Republic) P Rikl	4	4

Quarterfinals
8	(France) T Arribagé (France) A Olivetti	6	6
3	(Germany) K Krawietz (Germany) T Pütz	4	4
(Portugal) F Cabral (United States) JJ Tracy	6	6
(United States) R Galloway (Sweden) A Göransson	3	4

Semifinals
8	(France) T Arribagé (France) A Olivetti	6	4	[8]
(Portugal) F Cabral (United States) JJ Tracy	4	6	[10]

== Seeded teams ==
The following are the seeded teams. Seedings are based on ATP rankings as of 28 September 2026.

Country	Player	Country	Player	Rank^{1}	Seed
USA	Christian Harrison	GBR	Neal Skupski	7	1
ESA	Marcelo Arévalo	CRO	Mate Pavić	17	2
GER	Kevin Krawietz	GER	Tim Pütz	18	3
ITA	Simone Bolelli	ITA	Andrea Vavassori	22	4
GBR	Julian Cash	GBR	Lloyd Glasspool	26	5
ARG	Guido Andreozzi	FRA	Manuel Guinard	31	6
BRA	Orlando Luz	BRA	Rafael Matos	35	7
FRA	Théo Arribagé	FRA	Albano Olivetti	39	8

=== Other entry information ===
==== Wildcards ====
- (Monaco) Romain Arneodo / (Mexico) Santiago González
- (China) Jiang Fumin / (China) Zhang Tianhui
- (China) Zhang Zhizhen / (China) Zhou Yi

==== Protected ranking ====
- (Czech Republic) Petr Nouza / (New Zealand) Michael Venus

==== Alternates ====
- (Netherlands) Sander Arends / (United Kingdom) Luke Johnson
- (United States) Robert Cash / (Austria) Alexander Erler

==== Withdrawals ====
- Karen Khachanov / Andrey Rublev → replaced by (United States) Robert Cash / (Austria) Alexander Erler
