= 2025 Crete Challenger III – Singles =

Singles
- 2025 Crete Challenger III

Final
- Champion: (Spain) Rafael Jódar
- Runner-up: (France) Dan Added
- Score: 6–4, 6–2

Events
Singles	Doubles
- Crete Challenger

Dimitar Kuzmanov was the defending champion but chose not to defend his title.

Rafael Jódar won the title after defeating Dan Added 6–4, 6–2 in the final.

== Seeds ==
1. (United Kingdom) George Loffhagen (second round)
2. (Czech Republic) Marek Gengel (first round, retired)
3. (France) Matteo Martineau (first round)
4. (China) Cui Jie (first round)
5. (Greece) Stefanos Sakellaridis (second round)
6. (France) Dan Added (final)
7. (United States) Christian Langmo (first round)
8. (Jordan) Abdullah Shelbayh (withdrew)

== Draw ==
Key

- Q = Qualifier
- WC = Wild card
- LL = Lucky loser
- Alt = Alternate
- ITF = ITF entry
- PR = Protected ranking
- SR = Special ranking
- SE = Special exempt
- JE = Junior exempt
- JR = Junior Accelerator Programme entrant
- CO = College Accelerator Programme entrant
- NG = Next Gen Accelerator Program entrant
- w/o = Walkover
- r = Retired
- d = Defaulted

=== Finals ===
Semifinals
Alt	(Spain) Rafael Jódar	6	2
(Czech Republic) Petr Brunclík	2	0^{r}
(France) Laurent Lokoli	4	1
6	(France) Dan Added	6	6

Final
Alt	(Spain) Rafael Jódar	6	6
6	(France) Dan Added	4	2

=== Top half ===
First round
1	(United Kingdom) G Loffhagen	6	4	6
(Ukraine) Vadym Ursu	1	6	2
Alt	(Spain) R Jódar	7^{7}	6
(Italy) Luca Potenza	6^{3}	4
(United Kingdom) H Wendelken	6	7
(France) L Poullain	1	5
Q	I Ivashka	6	1	7^{8}
7	(United States) Christian Langmo	3	6	6^{6}
4	(China) J Cui	5	1
(Thailand) M Jones	7	6
WC	(Greece) Pe Tsitsipas	4	3
Q	(France) T Papamalamis	6	6
(Czech Republic) Petr Brunclík	6	3	7
Q	(Hungary) Péter Makk	3	6	5
Q	(Israel) Orel Kimhi	5	2
LL	(Italy) F Moroni	7	6

Second round
1	(United Kingdom) G Loffhagen	4	6	4
Alt	(Spain) R Jódar	6	3	6
(United Kingdom) H Wendelken	2	6	6
Q	I Ivashka	6	2	3
(Thailand) M Jones	6	7
Q	(France) T Papamalamis	1	5
(Czech Republic) P Brunclík	6	6
LL	(Italy) F Moroni	4	3

Quarterfinals
Alt	(Spain) R Jódar	6	4	6
(United Kingdom) H Wendelken	0	6	3
(Thailand) M Jones	2	2
(Czech Republic) P Brunclík	6	6

Semifinals
Alt	(Spain) R Jódar	6	2
(Czech Republic) P Brunclík	2	0^{r}

=== Bottom half ===
First round
5	(Greece) S Sakellaridis	6	3	6
(Italy) A Binda	2	6	4
Q	(Italy) Luca Castagnola	7^{7}	3	2
(France) L Lokoli	6^{1}	6	6
WC	(Greece) Pa Tsitsipas	4	6	6^{5}
(Germany) M Rosenkranz	6	3	7^{7}
Q	(Italy) Pietro Fellin	6	6
3	(France) M Martineau	1	3
6	(France) D Added	6	6
(Greece) A Thanos	3	3
(Germany) M Wiskandt	3	6	6
(United Kingdom) S Parker	6	1	0
(United Kingdom) O Tarvet	5
PR	(Jamaica) B Bicknell	2^{r}
WC	(Greece) Ioannis Xilas	6	3
2	(Czech Republic) M Gengel	4	0^{r}

Second round
5	(Greece) S Sakellaridis	6	5	3
(France) L Lokoli	3	7	6
(Germany) M Rosenkranz	7	0^{d}
Q	(Italy) P Fellin	5	0
6	(France) D Added	6	6
(Germany) M Wiskandt	2	2
(United Kingdom) O Tarvet	2	5
WC	(Greece) I Xilas	6	7

Quarterfinals
(France) L Lokoli	6	6
Q	(Italy) P Fellin	4	3
6	(France) D Added	6	6
WC	(Greece) I Xilas	4	1

Semifinals
(France) L Lokoli	4	1
6	(France) D Added	6	6
