= 2026 Jiujiang Challenger =

- Date: 27 April – 3 May
- Edition: 1st
- Category: ATP Challenger 75
- Prize money: $107,000
- Surface: Hard
- Location: Jiujiang, China

Champions

Men's singles
- (Hong Kong) Coleman Wong

Men's doubles
- (South Korea) Nam Ji-sung / (Finland) Patrik Niklas-Salminen
- Jiujiang Challenger

The 2026 Jiujiang Challenger was a professional men's tennis tournament played on outdoor hard courts. It was the first edition of the tournament which was also part of the 2026 ATP Challenger Tour It took place in Jiujiang, China between 27 April and 3 May 2026.

== Singles main-draw entrants ==
=== Seeds ===
Country	Player	Rank^{1}	Seed
JPN	Sho Shimabukuro	108	1
AUS	Tristan Schoolkate	114	2
AUS	Adam Walton	117	3
HKG	Coleman Wong	122	4
AUS	Dane Sweeny	134	5
AUS	Alex Bolt	147	6
CHN	Bu Yunchaokete	157	7
EST	Mark Lajal	164	8

- ^{1} Rankings are as of 20 April 2026.

=== Other entrants ===
The following players received wildcards into the singles main draw:

- (China) Cui Jie
- (China) Te Rigele
- (China) Wang Aoran

The following players received entry into the singles main draw using protected rankings:

- (Australia) ~~Blake Ellis~~
- (Chinese Taipei) Jason Jung

The following player received entry into the singles main draw through the Next Gen Accelerator programme:

- (Serbia) Ognjen Milić

The following players received entry into the singles main draw as alternates:

- (Japan) Akira Santillan
- (Japan) Renta Tokuda

The following players received entry from the qualifying draw:

- (United States) Andre Ilagan
- (Germany) Daniel Masur
- (Japan) Hayato Matsuoka
- Marat Sharipov
- (Japan) Yuta Shimizu
- (Chinese Taipei) Wu Tung-lin

The following player received entry as a lucky loser:

- (Australia) Matthew Dellavedova

== Champions ==
=== Men's singles ===
- (Hong Kong) Coleman Wong def. (Australia) Adam Walton 7–5, 7–6^{(7–4)}.

=== Men's doubles ===
- (South Korea) Nam Ji-sung / (Finland) Patrik Niklas-Salminen def. (Chinese Taipei) Hsu Yu-hsiou / (Japan) Seita Watanabe 6–4, 6–4.
