= 2026 Rolex Shanghai Masters =

- Date: 7–18 October 2026
- Edition: 15th
- Category: ATP 1000
- Surface: Hard / outdoor
- Location: Shanghai, China
- Venue: Qizhong Forest Sports City Arena

Champions

Singles
- (Spain) Alejandro Davidovich Fokina

Doubles
- (Austria) Lucas Miedler / (Austria) Neil Oberleitner
- Shanghai Masters

The 2026 Rolex Shanghai Masters was a tennis tournament currently played on outdoor hard courts. It is the 15th edition of the Shanghai Masters and is classified as an ATP Masters 1000 event on the 2026 ATP Tour. It took place at Qizhong Forest Sports City Arena in Shanghai, China from 7 to 18 October 2026.

== Champions ==
=== Singles ===
- (Spain) Alejandro Davidovich Fokina def. (Spain) Rafael Jódar, 1–6, 7–6^{(7–5)}, 6–4

=== Doubles ===
- (Austria) Lucas Miedler / (Austria) Neil Oberleitner def. (Portugal) Francisco Cabral / (United States) JJ Tracy, 6–3, 6–4
