= Jiujiang Challenger =

- 2026 Jiujiang Challenger

ATP Challenger Tour
- Location: Jiujiang, China
- Category: ATP Challenger Tour
- Surface: Hard

The Jiujiang Challenger is a professional tennis tournament played on hard courts. It is currently part of the ATP Challenger Tour. It was first held in Jiujiang, China in 2026.

== Past finals ==
=== Singles ===
Year	Champion	Runner-up	Score
2026	(Hong Kong) Coleman Wong	(Australia) Adam Walton	7–5, 7–6^{(7–4)}

=== Doubles ===
Year	Champions	Runners-up	Score
2026	(South Korea) Nam Ji-sung (Finland) Patrik Niklas-Salminen	(Chinese Taipei) Hsu Yu-hsiou (Japan) Seita Watanabe	6–4, 6–4
