= Rafael Jódar =

Spanish tennis player (born 2006)

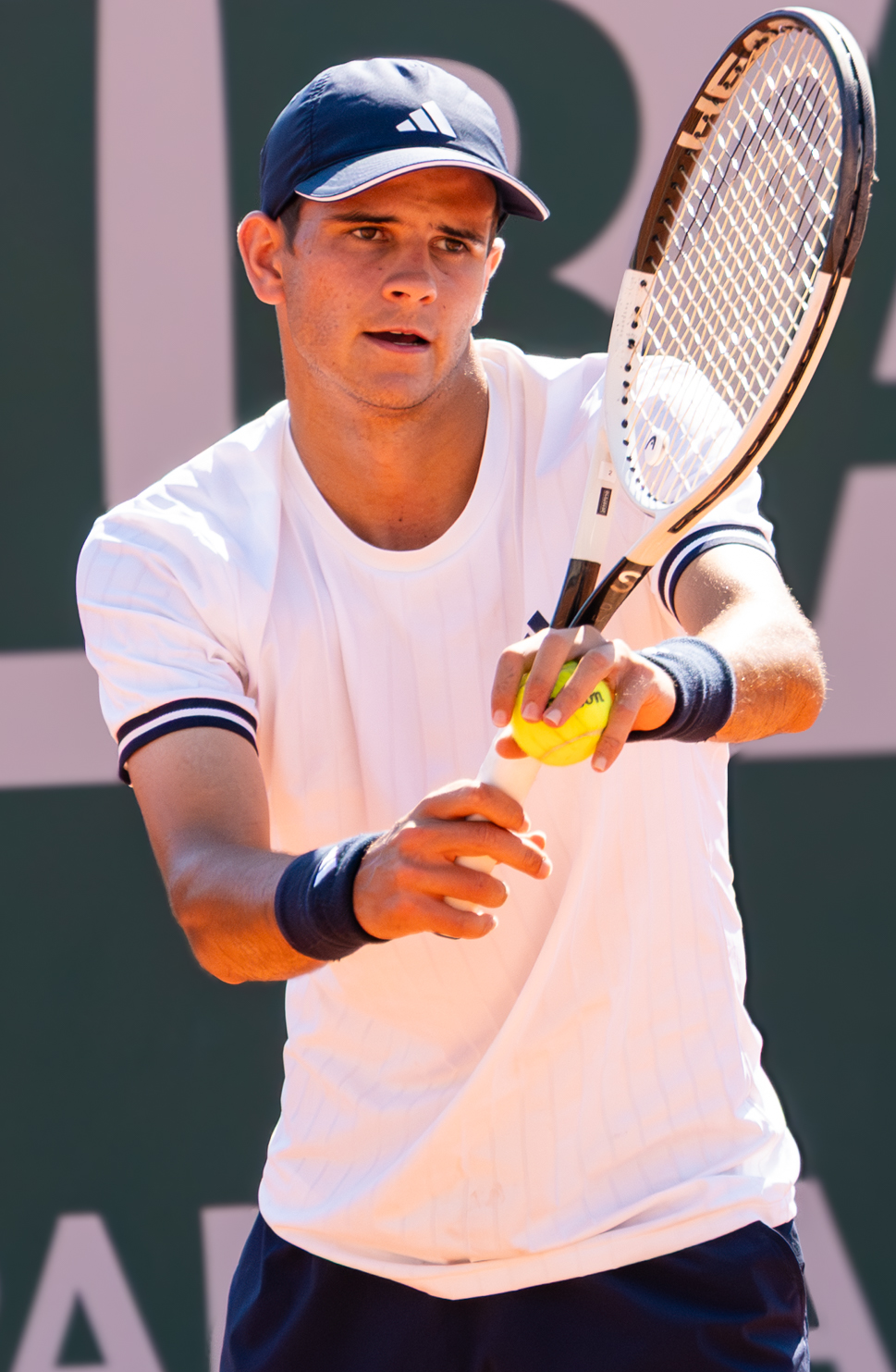
- Jódar at the 2026 French Open
- Country (sports): Spain
- Residence: Madrid, Spain
- Born: 17 September 2006 (age 20) Madrid, Spain
- Height: 1.91 m (6 ft 3 in)
- Turned pro: 2025
- Plays: Right-handed (two-handed backhand)
- College: University of Virginia
- Coach: Rafael Jódar (Note: English: Rafael Jódar III (based on the patrilineal family line); also known as Rafael Jódar Sr.) (father); Brian Rasmussen (UVA Assistant Coach)
- Prize money: US $3,694,798

Singles
- Career record: 47–22
- Career titles: 1
- Highest ranking: No. 10 (2 November 2026)
- Current ranking: No. 10 (16 November 2026)

Grand Slam singles results
- Australian Open: 2R (2026)
- French Open: QF (2026)
- Wimbledon: 3R (2026)
- US Open: 1R (2026)

Other tournaments
- Tour Finals: RR (2026)

Doubles
- Career record: 1–2 (at ATP Tour level, Grand Slam level, and in Davis Cup)
- Career titles: 0
- Highest ranking: No. 344 (2 March 2026)
- Current ranking: No. 357 (16 November 2026)

Team competitions
- Davis Cup: 1–0
- Last updated on: 17 November 2026.

Rafael Jódar Camacho (Spanish pronunciation: [ˈxoðaɾ kaˈmat͡ʃo]) (born 17 September 2006) is a Spanish professional tennis player. He has a career-high ranking of world No. 10 in men's singles by the Association of Tennis Professionals (ATP), achieved on 2 November 2026. Jódar has won one ATP Tour singles title at the 2026 Grand Prix Hassan II. He is currently the No. 2 Spanish player in men's singles.

Jódar made his ATP Tour debut in 2026, and during that season rapidly ascended to the top of the sport. He won his first tour-level title and reached his first major quarterfinal at the French Open, and ultimately set records for the shortest time between tour-level debut and top-10 rankings debut, and for becoming the first man to reach the ATP Finals in the same year as his tour-level debut.

== Early life ==
Rafael Jódar Camacho (Note: English: Rafael Jódar IV; based on his patrilineal (Jódar) family line.) was born on 17 September 2006 in Madrid, Spain. On his paternal side, Jódar's family is originally from Baeza. Contrary to popular belief, he was not named after Rafael Nadal; his father, paternal grandfather, and great-grandfather all share the name "Rafael". However, he started taking tennis lessons in his early childhood, inspired by his idol Nadal; with whom he shares the nickname "Rafa".

== College ==
Jódar attended the University of Virginia in 2024, before announcing his decision to pursue tennis full-time on 31 December 2025. He had 19 wins and just 3 losses, reaching the NCAA number four singles ranking. He was selected for the ATP Next Gen Accelerator, giving him wildcard spots on the Challenger Tour.

== Junior career ==
In June 2024, he won the prestigious U18 grass tournament in Roehampton, England, prior to a run at the 2024 Wimbledon Championships that saw him become the last Spaniard in the main draw competition and included a straight sets victory over fourth seed Tomasz Berkieta. He lost in the quarterfinals to Naoya Honda. He also reached the quarterfinals of the doubles category, with compatriot Andrés Santamarta Roig, where they lost to Czech pair Jan Kumstát and Jan Klimas.

In September, he was crowned champion in the boys' singles category at the 2024 US Open, with impressive victories over second seed Kaylan Bigun in the quarterfinal and third seed Rei Sakamoto in the semifinal. He defeated first seed Nicolai Budkov Kjaer in the final.

Later that season, Jódar qualified for the 2024 ITF Junior Finals, where he was a runner-up. In the final, he lost to Mees Röttgering in straight sets.

Jódar had good results on the ITF junior circuit, maintaining a 93–18 singles win-loss record, and reached an ITF junior combined ranking of world No. 4 on 9 September 2024.

== Professional career ==
=== 2025: Challenger titles, NextGen Finals ===
In August, Jódar won his maiden ATP Challenger title at the Crete Challenger III, Greece, as an alternate, defeating sixth seed Dan Added in the final. The two players faced again the following week at the Crete Challenger IV, this time Added defeating Jódar in the semifinal.

Ranked No. 283, Jódar won his second title at the 2025 Lincoln Challenger, United States, defeating three seeds en route: Top seed Brandon Holt, fourth seed Patrick Kypson and eight seed Martin Damm Jr., and moved to ninth position in the NextGen race on 20 October 2025.

Jódar won his third straight Challenger title at the Jonathan Fried Pro Challenger in Charlottesville, and became the third Spanish teenager to win at least three Challenger titles, joining Carlos Alcaraz and Nicolas Almagro. He reached a new career-high ranking of world No. 166 on 3 November 2025 and moved back to ninth position in the ATP Live Race To Jeddah. In November, he officially qualified for the 2025 Next Gen ATP Finals. In his opening match, he saved four match points to secure a victory against top seed and eventual champion Learner Tien. He also defeated compatriot and friend Martín Landaluce at the event. Having begun 2025 ranked No. 895 in singles, Jódar climbed more than 700 spots in the rankings across that season.

In December 2025, Jódar announced that he was turning professional full time.

=== 2026: Tour-level debut, ATP title, French Open quarterfinalist, top 10 ===
In January, Jódar made his Grand Slam and tour-level debut at the 2026 Australian Open as a qualifier, securing a maiden main draw win against fellow qualifier Rei Sakamoto in the first round.

Jódar made his main-draw Masters 1000 debut at the 2026 BNP Paribas Open in Indian Wells, after receiving a wildcard. At the 2026 Miami Open after qualifying for the main draw, Jódar defeated Yannick Hanfmann and Aleksandar Vukic recording his first wins at the 1000-level, to reach the third round. He fell to Tomás Martín Etcheverry but despite the loss Jódar reached the top 100 in the singles rankings on 30 March 2026.

In April, Jódar earned his first ATP title at the Grand Prix Hassan II, Morocco, defeating the Argentinian Marco Trungelliti, rising to a career high world ranking of No. 57 on 6 April 2026. Two weeks later he reached the top 50 in the singles ATP rankings on 20 April 2026, following his first ATP 500 semifinal showing as a wildcard, at his home event, the 2026 Barcelona Open Banc Sabadell. The following week, he also made his debut at his home Masters, the 2026 Mutua Madrid Open, defeating Jesper de Jong in the first round. In the second round he earned his first win over a top-ten player with a win over world number eight Alex de Minaur for the loss of only four games. He then defeated João Fonseca and Vit Kopriva to reach the quarter-final of a Masters for the first time in his career, where he lost to top-seed Jannik Sinner. Following the tournament his ranking rose to a career high world no. 34. The following week, he defeated Learner Tien to also reach the quarter-finals of the 2026 Italian Open, becoming the first teenager to reach that stage of the competition since Novak Djokovic in 2007 and the first teenager to reach that stage in Rome and Madrid in the same sesson since Rafael Nadal in 2005. Jódar lost to home favourite Luciano Darderi in 3 sets in the quarter-final. His singles ranking reached No. 29 on 18 May 2026.

With his ranking up to world No. 29, Jódar was 27th seed at the French Open. On his main draw debut at the event, he dropped just five games in a straight sets win against American Aleksandar Kovacevic in the first round. It was the fewest games lost in a French Open debut since Novak Djokovic against Robby Ginepri in 2005. In the second round he defeated James Duckworth before facing Alex Michelsen. He reached his first Grand Slam quarterfinal with a five set win against compatriot Pablo Carreño Busta, coming back from two sets down. He then lost to Alexander Zverev in the quarter-final in straight sets.

Jódar made his grass court debut at Wimbledon, reaching the third round with a come-from-behind defeat of Carreño Busta for the second consecutive Grand Slam before losing to Shintaro Mochizuki.

In the North American hardcourt season, Jódar made his second ATP Tour final at the Mubadala DC Open, losing to Taylor Fritz. He then made his first Masters semi-final at the 2026 National Bank Open in Montreal, reaching a career-high ranking of No. 11. At the US Open, he suffered a surprise first round exit to Bu Yunchaokete.

Following the US Open, Jódar represented Spain in the 2026 Davis Cup Qualifiers for the first time, beating Cristian Garín of Chile to help advance Spain to the Davis Cup Finals. He also made his Laver Cup debut and defeated Alexander Bublik to earn a point for Team Europe. In October, he reached his first ATP Masters 1000 final at the 2026 Rolex Shanghai Masters, losing in three sets to compatriot Alejandro Davidovich Fokina and having recorded wins over Casper Ruud in the quarter-finals and Daniil Medvedev in the semi-finals. With the run to the final he moved to ninth in the PIF ATP Live Race To Turin. On the 2nd of November, just 287 days after his ATP Tour-level debut, Jódar made his debut inside the top 10, breaking the previous record held by Gustavo Kuerten, who debuted in the top 10 490 days after his tour-level debut.

== Performance timeline ==
Key
W	F	SF	QF	#R	RR	Q#	DNQ	A	NH

(W) winner; (F) finalist; (SF) semifinalist; (QF) quarterfinalist; (#R) rounds 4, 3, 2, 1; (RR) round-robin stage; (Q#) qualification round; (DNQ) did not qualify; (A) absent; (NH) not held; (SR) strike rate (events won / competed); (W–L) win–loss record.

=== Singles ===
Current through the 2026 ATP Finals.

Tournament	2025	2026	SR	W–L	Win%
Grand Slam tournaments
Australian Open	A	2R	0 / 1	1–1	50%
French Open	A	QF	0 / 1	4–1	80%
Wimbledon	A	3R	0 / 1	2–1	67%
US Open	A	1R	0 / 1	0–1	0%
Win–loss	0–0	7–4	0 / 4	7–4	64%
Year-end championships
ATP Finals	DNQ	RR	0 / 1	0–3	0%
National representation
Davis Cup	A	QF	0 / 1	1–0	100%
ATP 1000 tournaments
Indian Wells Open	A	1R	0 / 1	0–1	0%
Miami Open	A	3R	0 / 1	2–1	67%
Monte-Carlo Masters	A	A	0 / 0	0–0	–
Madrid Open	A	QF	0 / 1	4–1	80%
Italian Open	A	QF	0 / 1	3–1	75%
Canadian Open	A	SF	0 / 1	4–1	80%
Cincinnati Open	A	4R	0 / 1	2–1	67%
Shanghai Masters	A	F	0 / 1	5–1	83%
Paris Masters	A	2R	0 / 1	1–1	50%
Win–loss	0–0	21–8	0 / 8	21–8	74%
Career statistics
Tournaments	0	21	Career total: 21		
Titles	0	1	Career total: 1		
Finals	0	3	Career total: 3		
Hard win–loss	2–1	23–17	0 / 15	25–18	58%
Clay win–loss	0–0	20–4	1 / 5	20–4	83%
Grass win–loss	0–0	2–1	0 / 1	2–1	67%
Overall win–loss	2–1	45–22	1 / 21	47–23	67%
Win %	67%	67%	67%		
Year-end ranking (Note: 2023: ATP ranking–1751) (Note: 2024: ATP ranking–896)	168	10	$3,694,798		

== ATP Masters 1000 finals ==
=== Singles: 1 (runner-up) ===
Result	Year	Tournament	Surface	Opponent	Score
Loss	2026	Shanghai Masters	Hard	(Spain) Alejandro Davidovich Fokina	6–1, 6–7^{(5–7)}, 4–6

== ATP Tour finals ==
=== Singles: 3 (1 title, 2 runner-ups) ===
Legend ATP 1000 (0–1) ATP 500 (0–1) ATP 250 (1–0)	Finals by surface Hard (0–2) Clay (1–0)	Finals by setting Outdoor (1–2)

Result	W–L	Date	Tournament	Tier	Surface	Opponent	Score
Win	1–0	Apr 2026	Grand Prix Hassan II, Morocco	ATP 250	Clay	(Argentina) Marco Trungelliti	6–3, 6–2
Loss	1–1	Jul 2026	Washington Open, US	ATP 500	Hard	(United States) Taylor Fritz	6–7^{(2–7)}, 4–6
Loss	1–2	Oct 2026	Shanghai Masters, China	ATP 1000	Hard	(Spain) Alejandro Davidovich Fokina	6–1, 6–7^{(5–7)}, 4–6

== ATP Challenger Tour finals ==
=== Singles: 4 (3 titles, 1 runner-up) ===
Finals by surface
Hard (3–1)
Clay (–)

Result	W–L	Date	Tournament	Surface	Opponent	Score
Win	1–0	Aug 2025	Crete Challenger III, Greece	Hard	(France) Dan Added	6–4, 6–2
Win	2–0	Oct 2025	Lincoln Challenger, US	Hard (i)	(United States) Martin Damm Jr.	6–7^{(3–7)}, 6–3, 6–3
Win	3–0	Oct 2025	Charlottesville Men's Challenger, US	Hard (i)	(United States) Martin Damm Jr.	6–3, 7–6^{(7–2)}
Loss	3–1	Jan 2026	Canberra Tennis International, Australia	Hard	(Belgium) Alexander Blockx	4–6, 4–6

== ITF World Tennis Tour finals ==
=== Singles: 1 (runner-up) ===
Result	Date	Tournament	Surface	Opponent	Score
Loss	Jul 2024	M25 Dénia, Spain	Clay	(Spain) Pol Martín Tiffon	2–6, 6–4, 3–6

== Junior Grand Slam finals ==
=== Singles: 1 (title) ===
Result	Year	Tournament	Surface	Opponent	Score
Win	2024	US Open	Hard	(Norway) Nicolai Budkov Kjær	2–6, 6–2, 7–6^{(10–1)}

== Wins over top 10 players ==
- Jódar has a 2–8 (20.0%) record against players who were, at the time the match was played, ranked in the top 10.

Season	2026	2027	Total
Wins	2	0	2

#	Player	Rk	Event	Surface	Rd	Score	Rk	Ref
2026
1.	(Australia) Alex de Minaur	8	Madrid Open, Spain	Clay	2R	6–3, 6–1	42	
2.	Daniil Medvedev	6	Shanghai Masters, China	Hard	SF	6–3, 6–4	13	

- Key: (Rk) first use, opponent rank; (Rd) round; (Rk) 2nd use, player rank; (Ref) reference; (F) final; (SF) semifinal; (QF) quarterfinal; (#R) rounds 4, 3, 2, 1; (RR) round-robin stage; (Q#) qualifying rounds or stages (3), 2, 1.

*As of 17 October 2026
