= Lincoln Challenger =

- 2026 Lincoln Challenger

ATP Challenger Tour
- Location: Lincoln, Nebraska, United States
- Venue: Hazel Dillon Tennis Center, University of Nebraska–Lincoln
- Category: ATP Challenger Tour
- Surface: Hard
- Prize money: $100,000 (2025)

The Lincoln Challenger is a professional tennis tournament played on hardcourts. It is currently part of the ATP Challenger Tour. It was first held in Lincoln, United States in 2024.

== Past finals ==
=== Singles ===
Year	Champion	Runner-up	Score
2026	(Australia) Bernard Tomic	(Estonia) Mark Lajal	4–6, 7–6^{(7–4)}, 7–6^{(7–3)}
2025	(Spain) Rafael Jódar	(United States) Martin Damm	6–7^{(3–7)}, 6–3, 6–3
2024	(United Kingdom) Jacob Fearnley	(Hong Kong) Coleman Wong	6–4, 6–2

=== Doubles ===
Year	Champions	Runners-up	Score
2026	(United States) Nathaniel Lammons (United States) Jackson Withrow	(United States) George Goldhoff (Canada) Cleeve Harper	6–3, 6–3
2025	(Australia) Patrick Harper (United Kingdom) Johannus Monday	(India) Aryan Shah (India) Dhakshineswar Suresh	6–4, 7–5
2024	(United States) Robert Cash (United States) JJ Tracy	(Uruguay) Ariel Behar (United Kingdom) Luke Johnson	7–6^{(8–6)}, 6–3
