= Martin Damm (born 2003) =

American tennis player

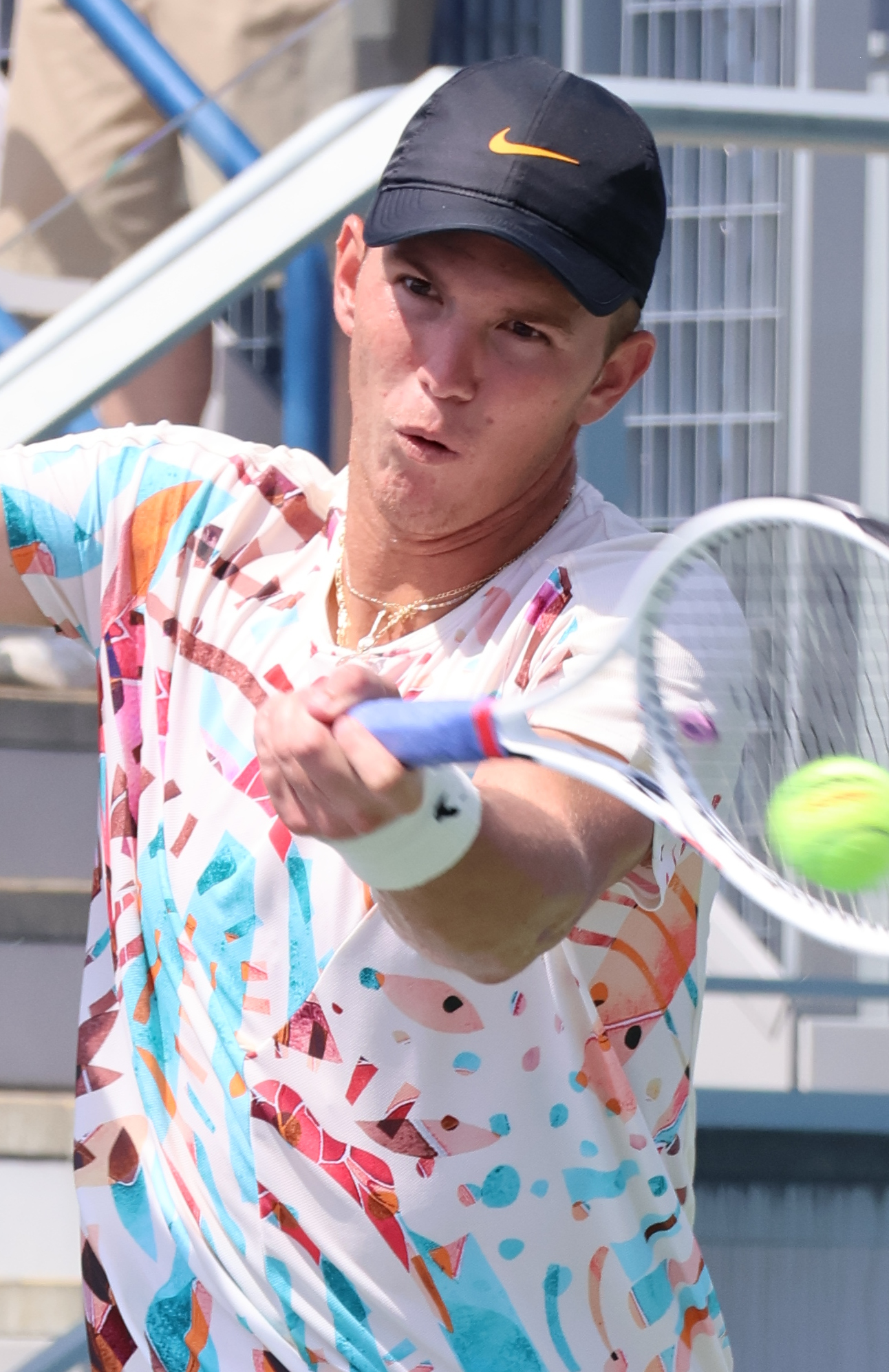
- Damm at the 2023 US Open
- Full name: Martin Damm Jr.
- Country (sports): United States
- Born: September 30, 2003 (age 23) Bradenton, Florida, United States
- Height: 6 ft 8 in (2.03 m)
- Turned pro: 2020
- Plays: Left-handed (two-handed backhand)
- Coach: Martin Damm, Micah Klousia
- Prize money: US $1,138,324

Singles
- Career record: 12–14 (at ATP Tour level, Grand Slam level, and in Davis Cup)
- Career titles: 0
- Highest ranking: No. 90 (August 31, 2026)
- Current ranking: No. 90 (August 31, 2026)

Grand Slam singles results
- Australian Open: 1R (2026)
- French Open: Q1 (2024, 2026)
- Wimbledon: 2R (2026)
- US Open: 2R (2025)

Doubles
- Career record: 1–3 (at ATP Tour level, Grand Slam level, and in Davis Cup)
- Career titles: 0
- Highest ranking: No. 303 (November 6, 2023)
- Current ranking: No. 356 (August 31, 2026)

Grand Slam doubles results
- US Open: 2R (2019)
- Last updated on: August 31, 2026.

Martin Damm Jr. (born September 30, 2003) is an American professional tennis player. He has a career-high ATP singles ranking of world No. 90 achieved on August 31, 2026 and a doubles ranking of No. 303 achieved on November 6, 2023.

== Career ==
=== 2019–2021: Juniors ===
On the junior tour, Damm has a career high junior ranking of No. 3, achieved on January 1, 2021.

In August 2019, Damm and his partner Toby Kodat won the USTA Boys 18s National Championships doubles title, earning the pair a wildcard entry into the doubles main draw of the 2019 US Open. Damm age 15 and fellow American Toby Kodat age 16 became the youngest men's doubles team to win a US Open match in the Open Era.

=== 2022–2023: Major, Masters qualifying debuts ===
Damm received a wildcard into the qualifying draw of the 2022 Miami Open and the 2022 US Open.

He also entered the qualifying competitions at the 2023 Miami Open, and at the 2023 US Open as a wildcard.

=== 2024: Masters debut & first wins, top 175 ===
In March, Damm was also awarded a main draw wildcard at the 2024 Miami Open for his Masters debut where he recorded his first ATP Tour and Masters level win over Zhizhen Zhang and 14th seed and compatriot Tommy Paul by retirement. As a result, he reached the top 175 in the rankings on 1 April 2024.

=== 2025: Major debut and first win ===
Ranked No. 431, Damm made his debut at the 2025 US Open, after making the main draw using a qualifying wildcard, and recorded his first major win over fellow American and wildcard Darwin Blanch.

=== 2026: Wimbledon first win, ATP semifinal, top 100 ===
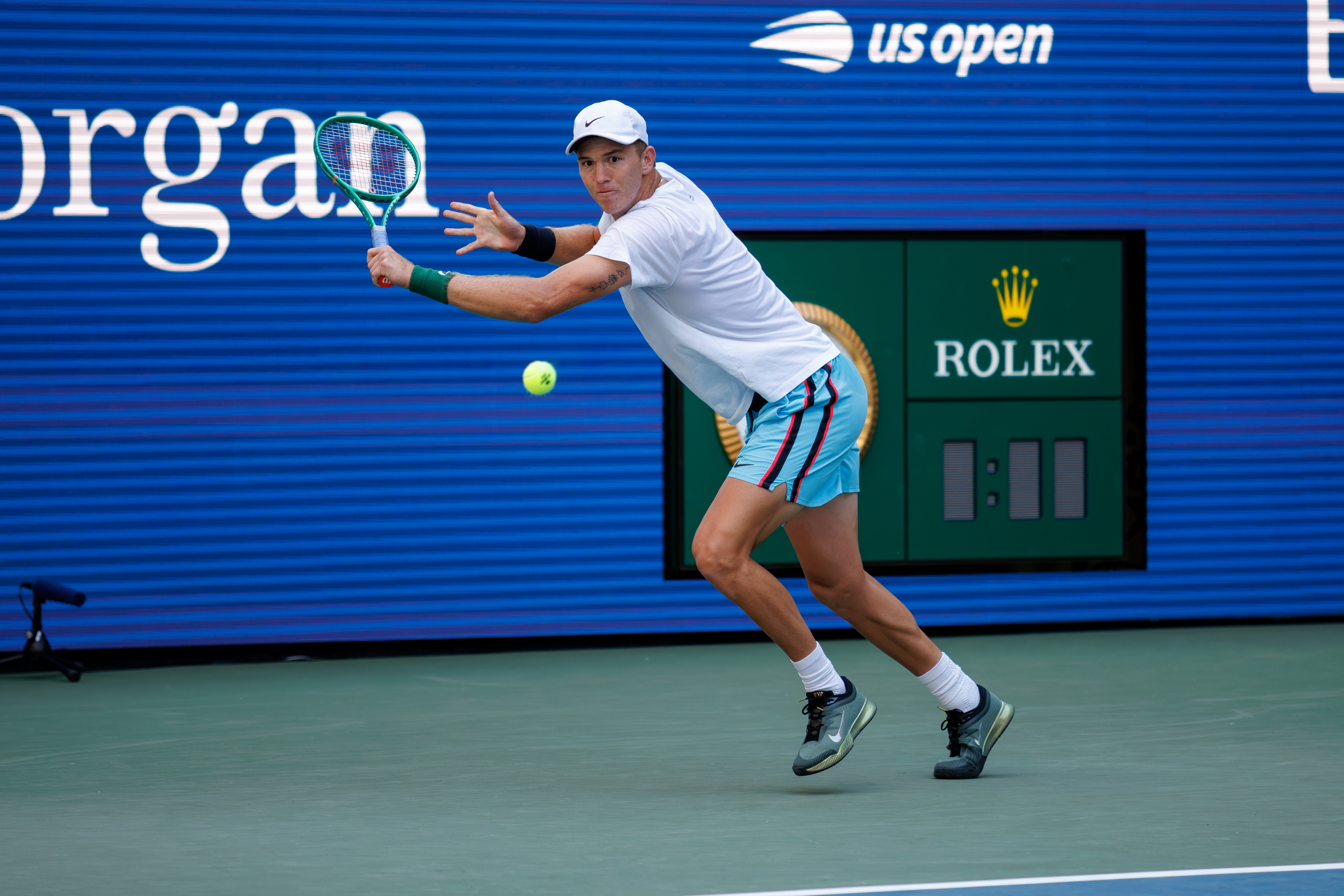
Martin Damm practicing at the US Open in 2026

Damm qualified for the main draw at the ATP 250 2026 Open Occitanie and upset seventh seed Hubert Hurkacz, and Roberto Bautista Agut in straight sets. He then downed Luca Nardi in the last eight to advance to his first ATP tour-level semifinal. As a result he reached a new career-high of No. 130 in the singles rankings, raising up 30 places, on 9 February 2025.

Damm reached the top 100 in the singles rankings on 3 August 2026, following qualifying for the Mubadala Washington Open.

Damm earned his first top-10 win by defeating Daniil Medvedev at the Winston-Salem Open.

== Personal life ==
Damm is the son of Czech former professional tennis player Martin Sr., who reached world No. 5 in doubles. He has two other siblings. During the COVID-19 pandemic Damm obtained Czech citizenship. He is fluent in both Czech and English. Damm is a fan of the Czech soccer club AC Sparta Prague.

== Performance timeline ==
Key
W	F	SF	QF	#R	RR	Q#	DNQ	A	NH

(W) winner; (F) finalist; (SF) semifinalist; (QF) quarterfinalist; (#R) rounds 4, 3, 2, 1; (RR) round-robin stage; (Q#) qualification round; (DNQ) did not qualify; (A) absent; (NH) not held; (SR) strike rate (events won / competed); (W–L) win–loss record.

=== Singles ===
Tournament	2022	2023	2024	2025	2026	SR	W–L	Win%
Grand Slam tournaments
Australian Open	A	A	A	A	1R	0 / 1	0–1	0%
French Open	A	A	Q1	A	Q1	0 / 0	0–0	–
Wimbledon	A	A	A	A	2R	0 / 1	1–1	50%
US Open	Q1	Q2	Q2	2R		0 / 1	1–1	50%
Win–loss	0–0	0–0	0–0	1–1	1–2	0 / 3	2–3	40%
ATP Masters 1000
Indian Wells Open	A	A	A	A	1R	0 / 1	0–1	0%
Miami Open	Q1	Q1	3R	Q1	2R	0 / 2	3–2	60%
Monte-Carlo Masters	A	A	A	A	A	0 / 0	0–0	–
Madrid Open	A	A	A	A	2R	0 / 1	1–1	50%
Italian Open	A	A	A	A	Q1	0 / 0	0–0	–
Canadian Open	A	A	A	A	1R	0 / 1	0–1	0%
Cincinnati Open	A	A	A	A	Q1	0 / 0	0–0	–
Shanghai Masters	NH	A	A	A		0 / 0	0–0	–
Paris Masters	A	A	A	A		0 / 0	0–0	–
Win–loss	0–0	0–0	2–1	0–0	2–4	0 / 5	4–5	44%

== ATP Challenger and ITF Tour finals ==
=== Singles: 19 (7 titles, 12 runner-ups) ===
Legend ATP Challenger Tour (0–5) ITF WTT (7–7)	Finals by surface Hard (7–9) Clay (0–3)

Result	W–L	Date	Tournament	Tier	Surface	Opponent	Score
Loss	0–1	Jan 2024	Oeiras Indoors, Portugal	Challenger	Hard (i)	(Switzerland) Leandro Riedi	6–7^{(6–8)}, 2–6
Loss	0–2	Sep 2025	Columbus Challenger, US	Challenger	Hard (i)	(United States) Michael Zheng	6–3, 3–6, 5–7
Loss	0–3	Oct 2025	Lincoln Challenger, US	Challenger	Hard (i)	(Spain) Rafael Jódar	7–6^{(7–3)}, 3–6, 3–6
Loss	0–4	Oct 2025	Charlottesville Men's Pro Challenger, US	Challenger	Hard (i)	(Spain) Rafael Jódar	3–6, 6–7^{(2–7)}
Loss	0–5	Oct 2026	Brest Challenger, France	Challenger	Hard (i)	(France) Moïse Kouamé	4–6, 7–6^{(7–5)}, 6–7^{(4–7)}

Result	W–L	Date	Tournament	Tier	Surface	Opponent	Score
Loss	0–1	Nov 2019	M25 Naples, US	WTT	Clay	(Argentina) Tomás Martín Etcheverry	6–7^{(4–7)}, 5–7
Loss	0–2	Mar 2021	M15 Rovinj, Croatia	WTT	Clay	(France) Corentin Denolly	6–3, 5–7, 0–6
Win	1–2	Sep 2021	M15 Champaign, US	WTT	Hard	(Romania) Gabi Adrian Boitan	6–3, 3–6, 6–2
Loss	1–3	May 2022	M25 Jablonec nad Nisou, Czech Republic	WTT	Clay	(Uzbekistan) Khumoyun Sultanov	7–6^{(12–10)}, 6–7^{(5–7)}, 3–6
Win	2–3	Jun 2022	M25 Santo Domingo, Dominican Republic	WTT	Hard	(France) Dan Added	6–3, 6–3
Win	3–3	Oct 2022	M25 Harlingen, US	WTT	Hard	(Australia) Bernard Tomic	6–7^{(4–7)}, 6–3, 6–4
Win	4–3	Jun 2023	M25 Santo Domingo, Dominican Republic	WTT	Hard	(Canada) Liam Draxl	7–6^{(7–5)}, 6–4
Loss	4–4	Aug 2023	M25 Southaven, US	WTT	Hard	(Luxembourg) Chris Rodesch	7–6^{(7–3)}, 1–6, 3–6
Win	5–4	Sep 2023	M25 Setúbal, Portugal	WTT	Hard	(United States) Dali Blanch	7–6^{(7–5)}, 3–6, 6–3
Win	6–4	Feb 2025	M15 Sharm El Sheikh, Egypt	WTT	Hard	(Italy) Alexandr Binda	6–3, 3–6, 6–2
Loss	6–5	Feb 2025	M15 Sharm El Sheikh, Egypt	WTT	Hard	(Italy) Federico Cinà	6–7^{(3–7)}, 6–7^{(3–7)}
Loss	6–6	May 2025	M25 Tbilisi, Georgia	WTT	Hard	(United Kingdom) Ryan Peniston	2–6, 6–3, 1–6
Loss	6–7	Jun 2025	M15 Vaasa, Finland	WTT	Hard	(United Kingdom) Millen Hurrion	7–5, 4–6, 5–7
Win	7–7	Jun 2025	M25 Elvas, Portugal	WTT	Hard	(France) Dan Added	6–3, 6–2

=== Doubles: 10 (7 titles, 3 runner-ups) ===
Legend ATP Challenger Tour (1–1) ITF WTT (6–2)	Finals by surface Hard (2–1) Clay (5–2)

Result	W–L	Date	Tournament	Tier	Surface	Partner	Opponents	Score
Loss	0–1	Nov 2022	Knoxville Challenger, US	Challenger	Hard (i)	(United States) Mitchell Krueger	(United States) Hunter Reese (United States) Tennys Sandgren	7–6^{(7–4)}, 6–7^{(3–7)}, [5–10]
Win	1–1	Apr 2026	Sarasota Open, US	Challenger	Clay	(Czech Republic) Hynek Bartoň	(United States) Garrett Johns (United States) Theodore Winegar	6–2, 6–1

Result	W–L	Date	Tournament	Tier	Surface	Partner	Opponents	Score
Win	1–0	Feb 2020	M25 Naples, US	WTT	Clay	(United States) Toby Kodat	(Colombia) Nicolás Barrientos (Colombia) Cristian Rodríguez	4–6, 6–4, [10–7]
Loss	1–1	Mar 2020	M15 Antalya, Turkey	WTT	Clay	(United States) Tristan Boyer	(Germany) Peter Heller (Germany) Peter Torebko	5–7, 2–6
Win	2–1	Mar 2021	M15 Opatija, Croatia	WTT	Clay	(United States) Alex Rybakov	(Croatia) Alen Rogic Hadzalic (Slovenia) Matic Špec	7–6^{(7–4)}, 4–6, [10–7]
Win	3–1	May 2021	M15 Valldoreix, Spain	WTT	Clay	(United States) Alex Rybakov	(Portugal) Francisco Cabral (Portugal) Gonçalo Falcão	6–4, 7–6^{(7–4)}
Win	4–1	May 2021	M15 Skopje, North Macedonia	WTT	Clay	(Czech Republic) Robin Stanek	(Netherlands) Max Houkes (Netherlands) Sidane Pontjodikromo	6–2, 7–6^{(7–5)}
Win	5–1	Oct 2021	M25 Rodez, France	WTT	Hard (i)	(United States) Felix Corwin	(Netherlands) Gijs Brouwer (Netherlands) Jelle Sels	3–6, 7–5, [10–7]
Loss	5–2	May 2023	M25 Prague, Czech Republic	WTT	Clay	(United States) Alex Rybakov	(United Kingdom) Stuart Parker (Switzerland) Jakub Paul	6–3, 3–6, [6–10]
Win	6–2	Sep 2023	M25 Sintra, Portugal	WTT	Hard	(United States) Dali Blanch	(Portugal) Jaime Faria (Portugal) Henrique Rocha	6–1, 6–2

== Wins against top-10 players ==
- Damm has a 1–3 (25%) match record against players who were, at the time the match was played, ranked in the top 10.

Season	2026	Total
Wins	1	1

#	Player	Rk	Event	Surface	Rd	Score	Rk	Ref
2026
1.	Daniil Medvedev	8	Winston-Salem Open, United States	Hard	2R	7–5, 6–3	92	

*As of 26 August 2026
