= Coleman Wong =

Hong Kong tennis player (born 2004)

Coleman Wong 黃澤林
- Wong at the 2026 US Open
- Full name: Coleman Wong Chak-lam
- ITF name: Chak Lam Coleman Wong
- Country (sports): Hong Kong
- Born: 6 June 2004 (age 22) Hong Kong
- Height: 1.91 m (6 ft 3 in)
- Plays: Right-handed (two-handed backhand)
- Coach: James Allemby, Im Kyu-tae
- Prize money: US $1,807,648

Singles
- Career record: 28–26 (at ATP Tour level, Grand Slam level, and in Davis Cup)
- Career titles: 0
- Highest ranking: No. 84 (9 November 2026)
- Current ranking: No. 84 (9 November 2026)

Grand Slam singles results
- Australian Open: Q3 (2026)
- French Open: 1R (2026)
- Wimbledon: Q2 (2025)
- US Open: 3R (2025)

Doubles
- Career record: 7–7 (at ATP Tour level, Grand Slam level, and in Davis Cup)
- Career titles: 0
- Highest ranking: No. 468 (9 September 2024)
- Current ranking: No. 886 (9 November 2026)

Team competitions
- Davis Cup: 22–9
Medal record
Men's tennis
Representing Hong Kong
Asian Games
Gold medal – first place	2026 Aichi–Nagoya	Singles
World University Games
Bronze medal – third place	2021 Chengdu	Mixed
National Games of China
Bronze medal – third place	2025 Greater Bay Area	Singles
- Last updated on: 9 November 2026.

Coleman Wong Chak-lam (Chinese: 黃澤林; born 6 June 2004) is a Hong Kong professional tennis player. He has a career-high ATP singles ranking of No. 84 achieved on 9 November 2026 and a doubles ranking of No. 468 achieved on 9 September 2024. He is the highest-ranked Hong Kong tennis player in history, having cracked the top 300 and later the top 100 in the ATP rankings. Wong is also the first male player from Hong Kong to compete in a Grand Slam main draw in the Open Era and to win an ATP Challenger title.

Wong represents Hong Kong at the Davis Cup, where he has a W/L record of 22–9.

== Personal life ==
Wong was educated in Diocesan Boys' School and as of 2023 is a student of the University of Hong Kong. He began playing tennis at the age of five. His father is a primary school principal. He has a sister named Elana Wong.

== Career ==
=== Juniors ===
Wong won the 2018 Orange Bowl singles under-14 junior tennis tournament.

After winning the 2021 US Open Boys' doubles event, he became Hong Kong's second-ever Grand Slam winner in any discipline, following Patricia Hy's 1983 Wimbledon title in Girls' doubles.

He won his second Grand Slam title at the 2022 Australian Open Boys' doubles event, with Bruno Kuzuhara, becoming the first back-to-back Grand Slam champion in boys' doubles since Hsu Yu-hsiou in 2017, at the 2017 Wimbledon and at the 2017 US Open.

Wong reached the semifinals in Boys' Singles at the 2022 US Open, which is the best ever result of Hong Kong male tennis players in any Grand Slam tournament.

Wong won 5 singles and 5 doubles titles at ITF World Tennis Tour Juniors, with a win-loss record of 101-54 (65%) in singles and 66-44 (60%) in doubles. He has a career-high ranking of 11 achieved on 10 October 2022.

Wong also played in the Junior Davis Cup in 2018, partnering with Chun Lam. The duo played against Carlos Alcaraz and Pablo Llamas Ruiz.

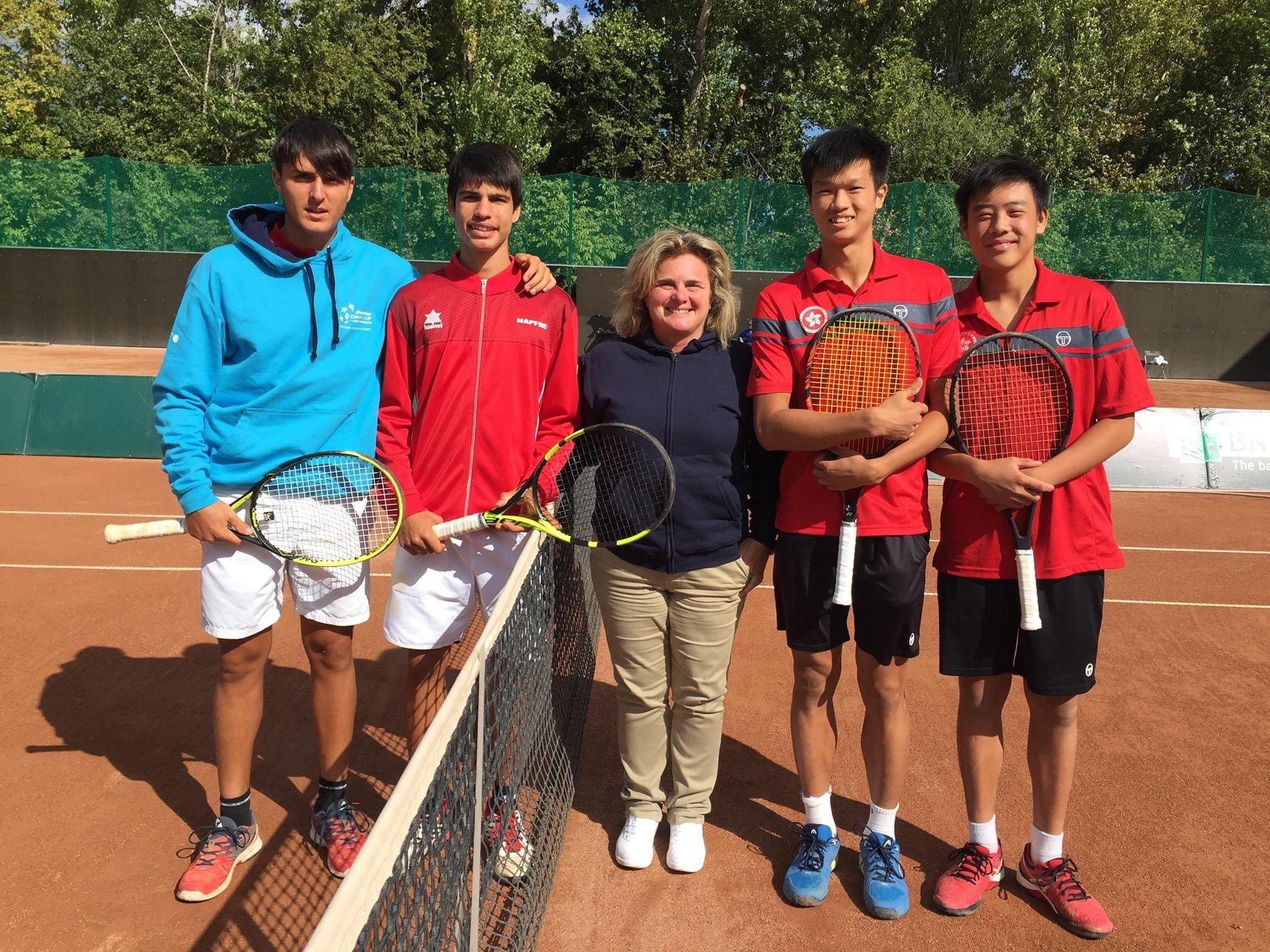
Coleman Wong and Chun Lam partner up to play against Carlos Alcaraz and Pablo Llamas Ruiz in a Junior Davis Cup tie between Hong Kong and Spain

=== 2022: First ITF doubles titles ===
In 2022, Wong won his first $15k doubles title in Spain in January, follow by his first $25k title in Vietnam in October.

=== 2023: Asian Games quarterfinals, Challenger final, Top 300 ===
In 2023, Wong made his first ITF Final in Tunisia, but finally lost to Lebanon's Hady Habib. Then in the following week, Wong won his first ITF $15k singles event in Tunisia on 25 June, beating Italy's Luca Giacomini, which made him the first tennis player from Hong Kong to win a professional men's singles title. In September, Wong won his first $25k singles title in Hong Kong, in addition to making the final in doubles with his compatriot Wong Hong-kit.

Wong then participated in the Asian Games hosted in Hangzhou, first beating then-world No. 98 Wu Yibing in the round of 16 after saving 5 match points, making him the first-ever player from Hong Kong to beat a top 100 player. However, he lost to South Korean player Hong Seong-chan in the quarterfinals.

The following week, Wong competed in an ITF $15k tournament in Doha, Qatar, finishing as the runner-up after losing 6–7^{(4–7)}, 4–6 to Marat Sharipov.

In October, he recorded his first ATP Challenger Tour main-draw win in Shenzhen, beating Linang Xiao. Wong went on to beat Térence Atmane and Huang Tsung-hao, and following the withdrawal of world No. 110 Aleksandar Kovacevic, he qualified for his first ATP Challenger final. Nevertheless, Wong lost to former top 50 player James Duckworth in the final by a decisive 0–6, 1–6 margin. Due to this performance, Wong reached a career-high ATP ranking of No. 361, climbing over 160 places from No. 530 in September, marking a significant milestone in his career as he became the first Hong Kong male tennis player ever to make an ATP Challenger Tour final.

Wong then traveled to Playford, Australia, receiving a special exemption at the City of Playford International Challenger 75 Tournament. He fought back to defeat New Zealand player Ajeet Rai in the first round. Wong went on to beat world No. 68 Thanasi Kokkinakis, who retired in the second set, and defeated Tristan Schoolkate and world No. 100 Taro Daniel in the quarterfinals and semifinals respectively, both in three sets. As a result, Wong reached his second consecutive ATP Challenger Tour final, setting up a rematch of the Shenzhen final from the previous week with James Duckworth. Despite losing by a small margin of 5–7, 5–7, his performance allowed him to become both the first Hong Kong male tennis player ever to crack the top 300 and the highest-ranked Hong Kong male tennis player in history, elevating his ATP ranking to a career-high of No. 295.

Wong competed at his third ATP Challenger event in three weeks in Sydney, beating Pavle Marinkov in the opening round, but was later defeated by world No. 80 Rinky Hijikata in the next round in three sets.

Following a brief period of recovery, Wong traveled to Yokohama for the Keio Challenger. After defeating Altuğ Çelikbilek in the opening round, Wong made the quarter-finals following a walkover by James Duckworth. However, he was defeated by Yuta Shimizu in a grueling 6–7, 7–6, 6–7 loss. Wong ended his season at the Yokkaichi Challenger, making the semifinals before being defeated by world No. 81 Michael Mmoh.

=== 2024: ATP and historic Masters and top 150 debuts and first win ===
Wong received a wildcard to compete in both the singles and doubles draw for the 2024 Hong Kong Tennis Open, held in the first week of January after a 21-year absence, marking his ATP Tour debut. Wong also became the highest-ranked Hong Kong tennis player (by ATP world ranking) to ever play in the main draw in the history of this event. In singles, he lost to world No. 27 Lorenzo Musetti in straight sets. In doubles, Wong partnered with the Belgian Zizou Bergs, but they were defeated in the first round by Karen Khachanov and Andrey Rublev. The following week, Wong entered the Nonthaburi 2 Challenger in Nonthaburi, Thailand as the fifth seed. After beating Jason Tseng in straight sets, he was defeated by Yasutaka Uchiyama despite winning the first set. Wong then competed in doubles at an ITF $15k tournament in Manacor, which he had won two years prior, partnering with Russian player Yaroslav Demin. The pair reached the finals, where they were defeated in straight sets.

In February, Wong competed in two consecutive Challenger tournaments in Bangalore, India and Pune, India. In Bangalore, Wong advanced to the second round before losing to second-seeded Sumit Nagal. In Pune, Wong was defeated by British tennis player Felix Gill in the first round. Wong then entered the Delhi Open Challenger, where he reached the final while dropping only one set. He was defeated by Geoffrey Blancaneaux in the final in straight sets. Soon after, Wong competed at a Challenger tournament in Lugano, Switzerland. However, he was defeated by the eighth-seeded Jan Choinski in three sets.

In March, Wong received a wildcard into the qualifying draw of the 2024 Miami Open. He defeated both the then-world No. 89 Hugo Gaston and the then-world No. 97 Sumit Nagal to make his main draw debut at a Masters 1000, becoming the first-ever Hong Kong player to qualify for and play in the main draw of a Masters 1000-level event. As a result he broke into the top 200 in the ATP singles rankings, again making history as the first male Hong Kong player ever to do so.

Wong then competed in two Challenger tournaments in Busan and Gwangju. In Busan, Wong reached the quarterfinals before being defeated by Hong Seong-chan in three sets. Following reaching a fourth final at the 2024 Lincoln Challenger but losing to Jacob Fearnley, Coleman reached the top 150 at world No. 149 on 26 August 2024, making again history for Hong Kong, as the first player to achieve that milestone. In September, at the 2024 Hangzhou Open he recorded his first ATP Tour win as a qualifier, over wildcard Wu Yibing by retirement, becoming the first player from Hong Kong since 1972 to record a main draw victory. He lost to Brandon Nakashima in the next round. He received a wildcard for the main draw of the 2024 Rolex Shanghai Masters for his debut at this tournament.

=== 2025: Historic US Open third round ===
In August, Wong became the first player from Hong Kong to reach the main draw of a Grand Slam since Paulette Moreno at the 1988 Australian Open, and the first Hong Kong man to accomplish the feat in the Open Era, when he qualified for the 2025 US Open. He then became the first man from Hong Kong to win a Grand Slam singles match, when he defeated American Aleksandar Kovacevic in straight sets 6–4, 7–5, 7–6^{(7–4)} in the first round. He followed that up with a win over Australian Adam Walton and became the first player from Hong Kong to reach the third round at the US Open and the first Hong Kong man in a major third round.

=== 2026: Historic ATP Challenger title, & top 100 debut, ATP semifinal, Asian Games gold medal ===
Wong started his 2026 season at the Hong Kong Open where he achieved two notable career breakthroughs in the process, by becoming the first male player from Hong Kong to win a match at his city’s home tournament, and also becoming the first Hong Kong player in history to reach an ATP Tour quarterfinal.

Wong reached his second career ATP Tour quarterfinal after coming through qualifying at the Delray Beach Open.

Following downtrodden results in both Busan and Gwangju, Wong participated in Jiujiang hoping for a better result. He beat Mikhail Kukushkin and Rio Noguchi in the opening rounds. In the quarterfinals, he faced China's Yunchaokete Bu and beat him 7–6, 7–6 to set up a semifinal match against another Chinese player, Fajing Sun. Wong beat Sun 6–3, 6–4 to send him to his sixth career Challenger final. In the final, Wong won his maiden ATP Challenger title with a win over third seed Adam Walton in straight sets. He became the first-ever player from Hong Kong to win an ATP Challenger Tour title. He won the event without dropping a single set.

Coleman Wong Celebrates during the Men’s Qualifying Singles – Round 3 match. C. Wong defeated D. Lajović 6–4, 6–3. The match was delayed due to rain before Wong completed the victory.

Coleman Wong advanced to the final round of the 2026 US Open qualifying with a straight-sets victory over Dušan Lajović, 6–4, 6–3, in a match delayed by rain. Wong celebrated the win on Court 7 after securing his place in the next round.

Coleman Wong during a rain delay during his Men’s Qualifying Singles Round 3 match against Dušan Lajović on Court 7 at the USTA Billie Jean King National Tennis Center in Flushing Meadows, New York. The match was played in rainy conditions as weather disrupted the final day of qualifying.

Coleman Wong serves during the Men’s Qualifying Singles – Round 3 match of the 2026 US Open on Court 7 at the USTA Billie Jean King National Tennis Center in Flushing Meadows, New York.

At the Los Cabos Open, Wong knocked out Darwin Blanch, then upset Jiří Lehečka in the second round to make a third career Tour-level quarterfinal. This was the best result of his career by opponent's ranking. He subsequently defeated Jenson Brooksby in straight sets to make the first ATP Tour semifinal of his career. This result propelled Wong into the top 100 for the first time, making him the first Hong Kong male player to achieve such a feat on the ATP Tour.

Wong became the first Hong Kong player to win a gold medal during the 2026 Asian Games Men's Singles Tennis event, with his victory gaining him automatic qualification to the 2028 Summer Olympics.

== Performance timelines ==
Key
W	F	SF	QF	#R	RR	Q#	DNQ	A	NH

(W) winner; (F) finalist; (SF) semifinalist; (QF) quarterfinalist; (#R) rounds 4, 3, 2, 1; (RR) round-robin stage; (Q#) qualification round; (DNQ) did not qualify; (A) absent; (NH) not held; (SR) strike rate (events won / competed); (W–L) win–loss record.
To avoid confusion and double counting, these charts are updated at the conclusion of a tournament or when the player's participation has ended.

=== Singles ===
Current through the 2026 Shanghai Masters.

Tournament	2022	2023	2024	2025	2026	SR	W–L	Win %
Grand Slam tournaments
Australian Open	A	A	A	Q2	Q3	0 / 0	0–0	–
French Open	A	A	Q1	Q1	1R	0 / 1	0–1	0%
Wimbledon	A	A	Q1	Q2	Q1	0 / 0	0–0	–
US Open	A	A	Q2	3R	1R	0 / 2	2–2	50%
Win–loss	0–0	0–0	0–0	2–1	0–2	0 / 3	2–3	40%
National representation
Davis Cup	WG2	WG2	WG2	WG2	A	0 / 0	13–4	76%
ATP Tour Masters 1000
Indian Wells Open	A	A	A	Q1	Q1	0 / 0	0–0	–
Miami Open	A	A	1R	3R	Q2	0 / 2	2–2	50%
Monte-Carlo Masters	A	A	A	A	A	0 / 0	0–0	–
Madrid Open	A	A	A	1R	A	0 / 1	0–1	0%
Italian Open	A	A	A	A	A	0 / 0	0–0	–
Canadian Open	A	A	A	Q1	A	0 / 0	0–0	–
Cincinnati Open	A	A	A	2R	1R	0 / 2	1–2	33%
Shanghai Masters	NH	A	1R	Q1	1R	0 / 2	0–2	0%
Paris Masters	A	A	A	A	A	0 / 0	0–0	–
Win–loss	0–0	0–0	0–2	3–3	0–2	0 / 7	3–7	30%
Career statistics
	2022	2023	2024	2025	2026	SR	W–L	Win %
Tournaments	0	0	6	6	10	Career total: 22		
Titles	0	0	0	0	0	Career total: 0		
Finals	0	0	0	0	0	Career total: 0		
Hard win–loss	2–1	3–1	4–5	9–5	10–9	0 / 18	28–22	56%
Clay win–loss	0–0	0–0	0–0	0–1	0–2	0 / 3	0–3	0%
Grass win–loss	0–0	0–0	0–1	0–0	0–0	0 / 1	0–1	0%
Overall win–loss	2–1	3–1	4–6	9–6	10–11	0 / 22	28–26	52%
Win %	67%	75%	40%	60%	48%	51.85%		
Year-end ranking	744	253	170	150		$1,471,388		

== Other significant finals ==
=== Asian Games ===
==== Singles: 1 (1 gold medal) ====
Result	Year	Tournament	Surface	Opponent	Score
Gold	2026	Asian Games	Hard	(China) Wu Yibing	6–2, 6–4

== ATP Challenger Tour finals ==
=== Singles: 7 (1 title, 7 runner-ups) ===
Legend ATP Challenger Tour (1–7)	Finals by surface Hard (1–7) Clay (–) Grass (-)

Result	W–L	Date	Tournament	Tier	Surface	Opponent	Score
Loss	0–1	Oct 2023	Shenzhen Luohu Challenger, China	Challenger	Hard	(Australia) James Duckworth	0–6, 1–6
Loss	0–2	Oct 2023	City of Playford Challenger, Australia	Challenger	Hard	(Australia) James Duckworth	5–7, 5–7
Loss	0–3	Mar 2024	Delhi Open, India	Challenger	Hard	(France) Geoffrey Blancaneaux	4–6, 2–6
Loss	0–4	Aug 2024	Lincoln Challenger, US	Challenger	Hard	(United Kingdom) Jacob Fearnley	4–6, 2–6
Loss	0–5	Oct 2025	Seoul Challenger, South Korea	Challenger	Hard	(Japan) Sho Shimabukuro	4–6, 3–6
Win	1–5	Apr 2026	Jiujiang Challenger, China	Challenger	Hard	(Australia) Adam Walton	7–5, 7–6^{(7–4)}
Loss	1–6	Oct 2026	Guangzhou Nansha Challenger, China	Challenger	Hard	(Australia) Tristan Schoolkate	6–4, 6–7^{(3–7)}, 4–6
Loss	1–7	Oct 2026	Seoul Challenger, South Korea	Challenger	Hard	(France) Terence Atmane	6–7^{(3–7)}, 6–3, 6–7^{(9-11)}

== ITF World Tennis Tour finals ==
=== Singles: 4 (2 titles, 2 runner-ups) ===
Legend ITF WTT (2–2)	Finals by surface Hard (2–2) Clay (–)

Result	W–L	Date	Tournament	Tier	Surface	Opponent	Score
Loss	0–1	Jun 2023	M15 Monastir, Tunisia	WTT	Hard	(Lebanon) Hady Habib	3–6, 3–6
Win	1–1	Jun 2023	M15 Monastir, Tunisia	WTT	Hard	(Italy) Luca Giacomini	6–3, 5–7, 6–1
Win	2–1	Sep 2023	M25 Hong Kong	WTT	Hard	Egor Gerasimov	4–6, 7–6^{(10–8)}, [10–4]
Loss	2–2	Oct 2023	M15 Doha, Qatar	WTT	Hard	Marat Sharipov	6–7^{(4–7)}, 4–6

=== Doubles: 6 (2 titles, 4 runner-ups) ===
Legend ITF WTT (2–4)	Finals by surface Hard (2–4) Clay (–)

Result	W–L	Date	Tournament	Tier	Surface	Partner	Opponents	Score
Win	1–0	Jan 2022	M15 Manacor, Spain	WTT	Hard	(Spain) Marc Othman Ktiri	(Spain) Alberto Barroso Campos (Spain) Imanol López Morillo	6–2, 7–6^{(8–6)}
Win	2–0	Oct 2022	M25 Tay Ninh, Vietnam	WTT	Hard	(Japan) Tomohiro Masabayashi	(Chinese Taipei) Hsu Yu-hsiou (Thailand) Wishaya Trongcharoenchaikul	walkover
Loss	2–1	Oct 2022	M25 Jakarta, Indonesia	WTT	Hard	(China) Sun Fajing	(Japan) Tomohiro Masabayashi (Japan) Seita Watanabe	6–4, 4–6, [7–10]
Loss	2–2	Dec 2022	M15 Trnava, Slovakia	WTT	Hard	(Jordan) Abedallah Shelbayh	(Spain) Daniel Rincón (Paraguay) Adolfo Daniel Vallejo	4–6, 2–6
Loss	2–3	Sep 2023	M25 Hong Kong	WTT	Hard	(Hong Kong) Wong Hong Kit	(Japan) Matsuda Ryuki (South Korea) Son Ji Hoon	5–7, 4–6
Loss	2–4	Jan 2024	M15 Manacor, Spain	WTT	Hard	Yaroslav Demin	(Lithuania) Edas Butvilas (Spain) Carlos López Montagud	2–6, 6–7^{(6–8)}

== Junior Grand Slam finals ==
=== Doubles: 2 (2 titles) ===
Result	Year	Tournament	Surface	Partner	Opponents	Score
Win	2021	US Open	Hard	(France) Max Westphal	(Ukraine) Viacheslav Bielinskyi (Bulgaria) Petr Nesterov	6–3, 5–7, [10–1]
Win	2022	Australian Open	Hard	(United States) Bruno Kuzuhara	(United States) Alex Michelsen (Paraguay) Daniel Vallejo	6–3, 7–6^{(7–3)}
