= Dhakshineswar Suresh =

Indian tennis player (born 2000)

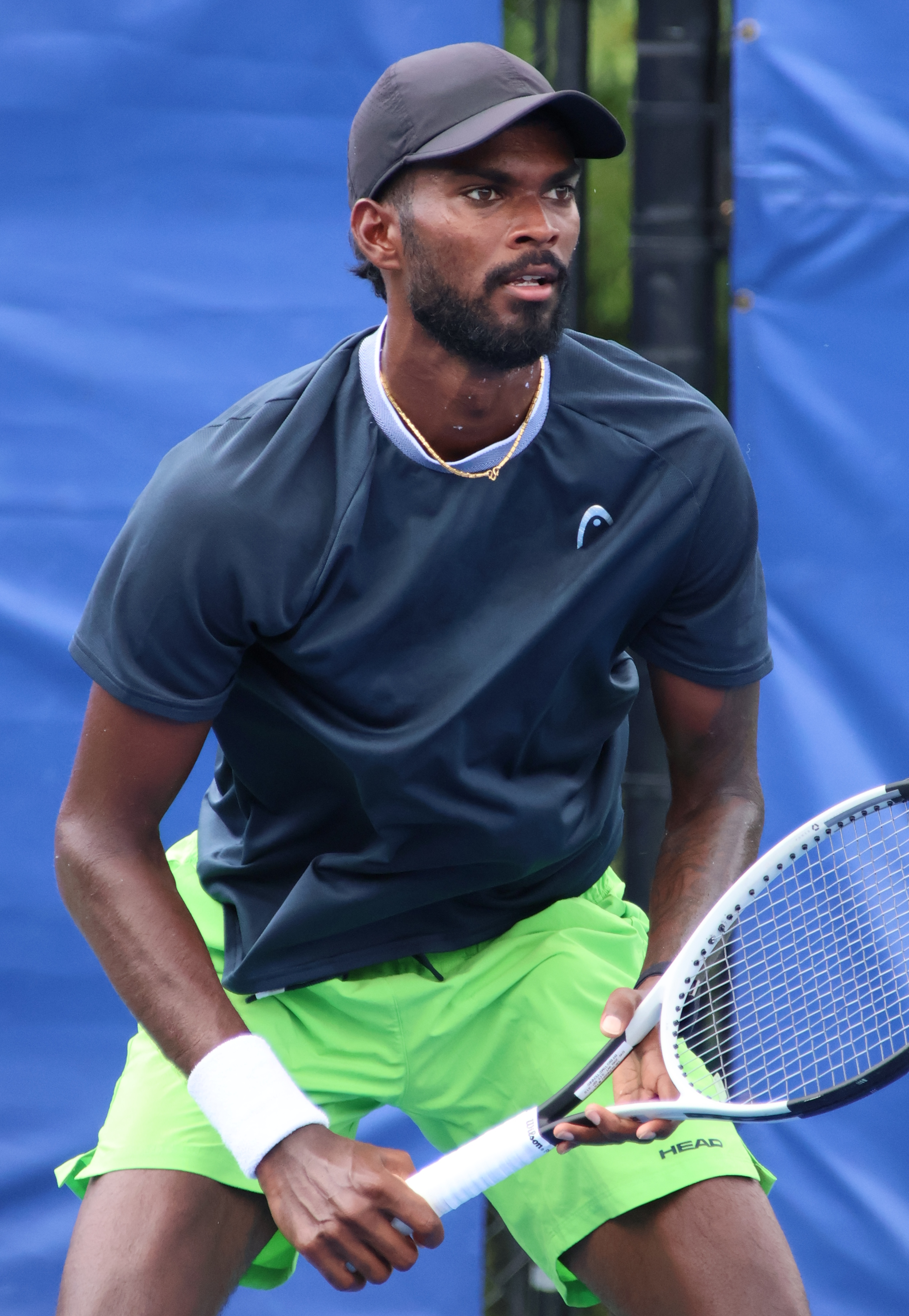
- Suresh in 2026
- Full name: Dhakshineswar Suresh Ekambaram
- Country (sports): India
- Born: 29 March 2000 (age 26) Madurai, India
- Height: 1.96 m (6 ft 5 in)
- Plays: Right-handed (two-handed backhand)
- College: Georgia Gwinnett; Wake Forest
- Prize money: US $77,997

Singles
- Career record: 4–3 (at ATP Tour level, Grand Slam level, and in Davis Cup)
- Career titles: 0
- Highest ranking: No. 353 (27 July 2026)
- Current ranking: No. 448 (9 November 2026)

Doubles
- Career record: 4–2 (at ATP Tour level, Grand Slam level, and in Davis Cup)
- Career titles: 0
- Highest ranking: No. 352 (18 August 2025)
- Current ranking: No. 1,029 (9 November 2026)
- Last updated on: 9 November 2026.

Dhakshineswar Suresh Ekambaram (born 29 March 2000) is an Indian tennis player. He has a career-high ATP singles ranking of world No. 353 achieved on 27 July 2026 and a doubles ranking of No. 352 achieved on 18 August 2025. He is the current No. 2 Indian singles player.

== College ==
He played college tennis at Georgia Gwinnett College before transferring to Wake Forest. During the 2023–24 season, he was part of the top ranked college tennis doubles team with partner Holden Koons.

== Career ==
Suresh made his ATP main draw doubles debut at the 2024 Winston-Salem Open, after receiving a wildcard into the doubles main draw with Luca Pow, where they recorded their first ATP main draw wins, reaching the semifinals. In the first round the pair defeated sixth seeds Andrés Molteni and Ariel Behar. The pair also returned for the 2025 edition as wildcards. In singles at the same tournament, on his qualifying ATP debut, he reached the second round of qualifying, but lost to Learner Tien. At the ATP 125 event, the 2026 Cranbrook Tennis Classic, he entered as a lucky loser and defeated Billy Harris, Borna Gojo and previous year's finalist Andres Martin to reach his maiden Challenger 125 semifinal. As a result, he reached the top 400 in the singles rankings on 27 July 2026.

== Davis Cup ==
He was India's hero in their defeat of Netherlands in a 2026 Davis Cup First Round tie, winning both his singles matches and also pairing up with Yuki Bhambri to win the doubles match. He became the first Indian to win three matches in a Davis Cup tie since Leander Paes in 2004. During the qualifier Suresh beat Guy den Ouden and Jesper de Jong to lead India to a 3–2 upset over the higher-seeded Netherlands team.
