= 2026 Fort Worth Challenger – Singles =

Singles
- 2026 Fort Worth Challenger

Final
- Champion: (United States) Jenson Brooksby
- Runner-up: (United States) Darwin Blanch
- Score: 6–1, 6–4

Events
Singles	Doubles
- Fort Worth Challenger

This was the first edition of the tournament.

Jenson Brooksby won the title after defeating Darwin Blanch 6–1, 6–4 in the final.

== Seeds ==
1. (United States) Jenson Brooksby (champion)
2. (United States) Darwin Blanch (final)
3. (United States) Braden Shick (first round)
4. (United States) Colton Smith (first round)
5. (United States) J. J. Wolf (second round)
6. (United States) Murphy Cassone (first round)
7. (Brazil) Igor Marcondes (second round)
8. (Germany) Max Hans Rehberg (first round)

== Draw ==
Key

- Q = Qualifier
- WC = Wild card
- LL = Lucky loser
- Alt = Alternate
- ITF = ITF entry
- PR = Protected ranking
- SR = Special ranking
- SE = Special exempt
- JE = Junior exempt
- JR = Junior Accelerator Programme entrant
- CO = College Accelerator Programme entrant
- NG = Next Gen Accelerator Program entrant
- w/o = Walkover
- r = Retired
- d = Defaulted

=== Finals ===
Semifinals
1	(United States) Jenson Brooksby	6^{14}	6	6
PR	(France) Gabriel Debru	7^{16}	3	2
Q	(Netherlands) Sander Jong	6^{5}	2
2	(United States) Darwin Blanch	7^{7}	6

Final
1	(United States) Jenson Brooksby	6	6
2	(United States) Darwin Blanch	1	4

=== Top half ===
First round
1	(United States) J Brooksby	3	6	6
(United States) M Krueger	6	3	2
(Australia) E Winter	3	1
(France) T Legout	6	6
(Argentina) LE Ambrogi	3	5
PR	(United States) Patrick Maloney	6	7
LL	(Japan) Kenta Miyoshi	6	7^{7}
6	(United States) M Cassone	4	6^{0}
3	(United States) B Shick	6	2	2
PR	(France) G Debru	2	6	6
Q	(United States) Gavin Young	4	0
Q	(United States) A Rybakov	6	6
(United States) A Martin	6	6^{6}	4
Q	E Arutiunian	3	7^{8}	6
WC	(United States) S Gorzny	5	6	4
7	(Brazil) I Marcondes	7	2	6

Second round
1	(United States) J Brooksby	6	6
(France) T Legout	2	4
PR	(United States) P Maloney	6	6^{3}	7^{7}
LL	(Japan) K Miyoshi	0	7^{7}	6^{5}
PR	(France) G Debru	1	6	6
Q	(United States) A Rybakov	6	3	4
Q	E Arutiunian	7^{7}	7
7	(Brazil) I Marcondes	6^{5}	5

Quarterfinals
1	(United States) J Brooksby	6	6
PR	(United States) P Maloney	4	2
PR	(France) G Debru	6	6
Q	E Arutiunian	3	2

Semifinals
1	(United States) J Brooksby	6^{14}	6	6
PR	(France) G Debru	7^{16}	3	2

=== Bottom half ===
First round
5	(United States) JJ Wolf	6	6
(United States) T Zink	4	3
Q	(Netherlands) Sander Jong	7^{7}	6
(United Kingdom) L Maxted	6^{3}	4
Q	(United States) K Bigun	6	6
WC	(United States) T Svajda	3	3
(United States) A Mayo	6	2	7^{9}
4	(United States) C Smith	4	6	6^{7}
8	(Germany) MH Rehberg	2	1
(Netherlands) M Röttgering	6	6
WC	(France) Cosme Rolland de Ravel	6	6
Alt	(United States) O Baris	1	2
(United States) D Milavsky	6	6
PR	(United States) G Nanda	4	4
Q	(Spain) A Pedrico Kravtsov	4	5
2	(United States) Dar Blanch	6	7

Second round
5	(United States) JJ Wolf	6	3	6^{1}
Q	(Netherlands) S Jong	4	6	7^{7}
Q	(United States) K Bigun	6	0	5
(United States) A Mayo	1	6	7
(Netherlands) M Röttgering	7	7^{7}
WC	(France) C Rolland de Ravel	5	6^{2}
(United States) D Milavsky	1	4
2	(United States) Dar Blanch	6	6

Quarterfinals
Q	(Netherlands) S Jong	7^{7}	0	7^{7}
(United States) A Mayo	6^{5}	6	6^{5}
(Netherlands) M Röttgering	3	4
2	(United States) Dar Blanch	6	6

Semifinals
Q	(Netherlands) S Jong	6^{5}	2
2	(United States) Dar Blanch	7^{7}	6
