= 2026 Fort Worth Challenger – Doubles =

Doubles
- 2026 Fort Worth Challenger

Final
- Champions: (Spain) Albert Pedrico Kravtsov (United States) Cooper Woestendick
- Runners-up: (United Kingdom) James Hopper (Japan) Shunsuke Mitsui
- Score: Walkover

Events
Singles	Doubles
- Fort Worth Challenger

This was the first edition of the tournament.

Albert Pedrico Kravtsov and Cooper Woestendick won the title via walkover after James Hopper and Shunsuke Mitsui withdrew before the final.

== Seeds ==
1. (United States) Daniel Milavsky / (United States) Braden Shick (semifinals)
2. (Chinese Taipei) Jason Jung / (United States) Joshua Sheehy (first round)
3. (United Kingdom) Tom Hands / (United Kingdom) Matthew Summers (first round)
4. (Denmark) Oskar Brostrøm Poulsen / (Sweden) Nikola Slavic (first round)

== Draw ==
Key

- Q = Qualifier
- WC = Wild card
- LL = Lucky loser
- Alt = Alternate
- ITF = ITF entry
- PR = Protected ranking
- SR = Special ranking
- SE = Special exempt
- JE = Junior exempt
- JR = Junior Accelerator Programme entrant
- CO = College Accelerator Programme entrant
- NG = Next Gen Accelerator Program entrant
- w/o = Walkover
- r = Retired
- d = Defaulted

First round
1	(United States) D Milavsky (United States) B Shick	6	7^{8}
E Arutiunian; D Ostapenkov	3	6^{6}
(Canada) D Chan (Japan) J Trotter	6	6
Alt	(United States) A Mayo (United States) Jack Vance	1	4
3	(United Kingdom) T Hands (United Kingdom) M Summers	6	5	[10]
(United States) K Poling (Germany) P Zahraj	4	7	[12]
(United States) K Chopra (United States) A Martin	5	6	[6]
(United Kingdom) James Hopper (Japan) S Mitsui	7	4	[10]
WC	(United States) Wally Thayne (United States) Jamie Vance	4	6^{4}
(United States) O Baris (Japan) Kenta Miyoshi	6	7^{7}
PR	(France) G Debru (Brazil) I Marcondes	6	4	[10]
4	(Denmark) OB Poulsen (Sweden) Nikola Slavic	4	6	[5]
WC	(Spain) A Pedrico Kravtsov (United States) C Woestendick	6	7^{7}
(India) J Nedunchezhiyan (United States) C Papa	3	6^{4}
(Venezuela) LD Martínez (United States) A Rybakov	7	4	[10]
2	(Chinese Taipei) J Jung (United States) J Sheehy	5	6	[5]

Quarterfinals
1	(United States) D Milavsky (United States) B Shick	1
(Canada) D Chan (Japan) J Trotter	0^{r}
(United States) K Poling (Germany) P Zahraj	1	4
(United Kingdom) J Hopper (Japan) S Mitsui	6	6
(United States) O Baris (Japan) K Miyoshi	6	4	[5]
PR	(France) G Debru (Brazil) I Marcondes	3	6	[10]
WC	(Spain) A Pedrico Kravtsov (United States) C Woestendick	7	6
(Venezuela) LD Martínez (United States) A Rybakov	5	3

Semifinals
1	(United States) D Milavsky (United States) B Shick	3	6	[7]
(United Kingdom) J Hopper (Japan) S Mitsui	6	3	[10]
PR	(France) G Debru (Brazil) I Marcondes	4	3
WC	(Spain) A Pedrico Kravtsov (United States) C Woestendick	6	6

Final
(United Kingdom) J Hopper (Japan) S Mitsui
WC	(Spain) A Pedrico Kravtsov (United States) C Woestendick	w/o
