= 2025 Miami Open – Men's singles =

Tennis tournament event

Men's singles
- 2025 Miami Open

Final
- Champion: (Czech Republic) Jakub Menšík
- Runner-up: (Serbia) Novak Djokovic
- Score: 7–6^{(7–4)}, 7–6^{(7–4)}

Details
- Draw: 96 (12 Q / 5 WC )
- Seeds: 32

Events
Singles	men	women
Doubles	men	women
- Miami Open

Jakub Menšík defeated Novak Djokovic in the final, 7–6^{(7–4)}, 7–6^{(7–4)} to win the men's singles tennis title at the 2025 Miami Open. It was his first ATP Tour title. Menšík became the lowest-ranked champion in Miami Open history at world No. 54, the second unseeded champion at the event (after Tim Mayotte in 1985), and the fourth player (after Roberto Carretero, Chris Woodruff and Albert Portas) to win a Masters 1000 event as their first tour-level title. The age gap between Djokovic and Menšík (18 years, 102 days) was the largest between two Masters finalists, surpassing the previous record from the 2005 Canadian Open between Rafael Nadal and Andre Agassi (16 years, 35 days).

Jannik Sinner was the reigning champion, but could not defend his title due to a three-month suspension for having tested positive for anabolic steroids during and after the 2024 Indian Wells Open.

With his third-round victory, Djokovic claimed his 411th career main-draw match win at the Masters 1000 level, surpassing Nadal's record. Aged 37 years and 10 months old, Djokovic became the oldest semifinalist and finalist in Masters 1000 history, overtaking Roger Federer's feats from the 2019 Miami Open.

Coleman Wong became the first player from Hong Kong to win a Masters 1000 main draw match, reaching the third round.

== Seeds ==
All seeds received a bye into the second round.

1. (Germany) Alexander Zverev (fourth round)
2. (Spain) Carlos Alcaraz (second round)
3. (United States) Taylor Fritz (semifinals)
4. (Serbia) Novak Djokovic (final)
5. (Norway) Casper Ruud (fourth round)
6. (United Kingdom) Jack Draper (second round)
7. Daniil Medvedev (second round)
8. Andrey Rublev (second round)
9. (Greece) Stefanos Tsitsipas (third round)
10. (Australia) Alex de Minaur (fourth round)
11. (Denmark) Holger Rune (second round)
12. (United States) Tommy Paul (third round)
13. (United States) Ben Shelton (second round)
14. (Bulgaria) Grigor Dimitrov (semifinals)
15. (Italy) Lorenzo Musetti (fourth round)
16. (United States) Frances Tiafoe (third round)
17. (France) Arthur Fils (quarterfinals)
18. (Canada) Félix Auger-Aliassime (third round)
19. (France) Ugo Humbert (second round)
20. (Czech Republic) Tomáš Macháč (fourth round, withdrew)
21. (Poland) Hubert Hurkacz (withdrew)
22. Karen Khachanov (third round)
23. (Argentina) Francisco Cerúndolo (quarterfinals)
24. (United States) Sebastian Korda (quarterfinals)
25. (Australia) Alexei Popyrin (second round)
26. (Czech Republic) Jiří Lehečka (second round)
27. (Canada) Denis Shapovalov (third round)
28. (France) Giovanni Mpetshi Perricard (second round)
29. (Italy) Matteo Berrettini (quarterfinals)
30. (Chile) Alejandro Tabilo (third round)
31. (United States) Brandon Nakashima (fourth round)
32. (United States) Alex Michelsen (second round)

Click on the seed number of a player to go to their draw section.

== Draw ==
Key

- Q = Qualifier
- WC = Wild card
- LL = Lucky loser
- Alt = Alternate
- ITF = ITF entry
- PR = Protected ranking
- SR = Special ranking
- SE = Special exempt
- JE = Junior exempt
- JR = Junior Accelerator Programme entrant
- CO = College Accelerator Programme entrant
- NG = Next Gen Accelerator Program entrant
- w/o = Walkover
- r = Retired
- d = Defaulted

=== Finals ===
Quarterfinals
17	(France) Arthur Fils	6^{5}	1
(Czech Republic) Jakub Menšík	7^{7}	6
3	(United States) Taylor Fritz	7	6^{7}	7
29	(Italy) Matteo Berrettini	5	7^{9}	5
24	(United States) Sebastian Korda	3	6^{4}
4	(Serbia) Novak Djokovic	6	7^{7}
23	(Argentina) Francisco Cerúndolo	7^{8}	4	6^{3}
14	(Bulgaria) Grigor Dimitrov	6^{6}	6	7^{7}

Semifinals
(Czech Republic) Jakub Menšík	7^{7}	4	7^{7}
3	(United States) Taylor Fritz	6^{4}	6	6^{4}
4	(Serbia) Novak Djokovic	6	6
14	(Bulgaria) Grigor Dimitrov	2	3

Final
(Czech Republic) Jakub Menšík	7^{7}	7^{7}
4	(Serbia) Novak Djokovic	6^{4}	6^{4}

=== Top half ===
==== Section 1 ====
First round
(France) B Bonzi	6^{6}	6	4
Q	(United Kingdom) J Fearnley	7^{8}	2	6
(Australia) J Thompson	3	6	7
(United States) M Giron	6	4	5
LL	(Canada) G Diallo	6	6
(Argentina) TM Etcheverry	3	0
(Germany) J-L Struff	6^{3}	3
(Spain) A Davidovich Fokina	7^{7}	6

Second round
1	(Germany) A Zverev	6	6
Q	(United Kingdom) J Fearnley	2	4
(Australia) J Thompson	7^{7}	7^{7}
28	(France) G Mpetshi Perricard	6^{4}	6^{1}
17	(France) A Fils	6	2
LL	(Canada) G Diallo	4	3^{r}
(Spain) A Davidovich Fokina	5	6^{5}
16	(United States) F Tiafoe	7	7^{7}

Third round
1	(Germany) A Zverev	7	6
(Australia) J Thompson	5	4
17	(France) A Fils	7^{13}	5	6
16	(United States) F Tiafoe	6^{11}	7	2

Fourth round
1	(Germany) A Zverev	6	3	4
17	(France) A Fils	3	6	6

==== Section 2 ====
First round
WC	(United States) C Eubanks	3	6^{4}
PR	(United States) R Opelka	6	7^{7}
(Italy) M Arnaldi	7^{7}	4	6
WC	(China) Y Wu	6^{3}	6	3
R Safiullin	6	3	6
PR	(United States) J Brooksby	3	6	3
(Spain) R Bautista Agut	4	6	1
(Czech Republic) J Menšík	6	3	6

Second round
11	(Denmark) H Rune	6	3	6^{5}
PR	(United States) R Opelka	4	6	7^{7}
(Italy) M Arnaldi	2	6	3
20	(Czech Republic) T Macháč	6	1	6
25	(Australia) A Popyrin	7^{7}	3	5
R Safiullin	6^{4}	6	7
(Czech Republic) J Menšík	7^{7}	7^{7}
6	(United Kingdom) J Draper	6^{2}	6^{3}

Third round
PR	(United States) R Opelka	6^{1}	3
20	(Czech Republic) T Macháč	7^{7}	6
R Safiullin	4	4
(Czech Republic) J Menšík	6	6

Fourth round
20	(Czech Republic) T Macháč
(Czech Republic) J Menšík	w/o

==== Section 3 ====
First round
(Italy) L Sonego	7	7
(Argentina) M Navone	5	5
Q	(Argentina) TA Tirante	6	3	6
(Italy) F Cobolli	1	6	3
(Spain) P Martínez	4	1
(Italy) L Darderi	6	6
WC	(Hong Kong) C Wong	6	6
(Germany) D Altmaier	4	3

Second round
3	(United States) T Fritz	7^{7}	6
(Italy) L Sonego	6^{2}	3
Q	(Argentina) TA Tirante	3	7^{7}	6^{3}
27	(Canada) D Shapovalov	6	6^{1}	7^{7}
LL	(Australia) A Walton	6	6
(Italy) L Darderi	4	4
WC	(Hong Kong) C Wong	7^{7}	2	7^{7}
13	(United States) B Shelton	6^{3}	6	6^{5}

Third round
3	(United States) T Fritz	7	6
27	(Canada) D Shapovalov	5	3
LL	(Australia) A Walton	7^{8}	4	6
WC	(Hong Kong) C Wong	6^{6}	6	4

Fourth round
3	(United States) T Fritz	6	7
LL	(Australia) A Walton	3	5

==== Section 4 ====
First round
(China) Y Bu	6	6
(United Kingdom) C Norrie	4	2
(Brazil) J Fonseca	6^{1}	6	6
(United States) L Tien	7^{7}	3	4
LL	(France) H Gaston	6	3
(Japan) Y Nishioka	4	1^{r}
(Belgium) Z Bergs	7^{7}	7
(Portugal) N Borges	6^{2}	5

Second round
10	(Australia) A de Minaur	6	6
(China) Y Bu	4	4
(Brazil) J Fonseca	6	6
19	(France) U Humbert	4	3
29	(Italy) M Berrettini	4	6	6
LL	(France) H Gaston	6	3	3
(Belgium) Z Bergs	7	6
8	A Rublev	5	4

Third round
10	(Australia) A de Minaur	5	7	6
(Brazil) J Fonseca	7	5	3
29	(Italy) M Berrettini	6	6
(Belgium) Z Bergs	4	4

Fourth round
10	(Australia) A de Minaur	3	6^{7}
29	(Italy) M Berrettini	6	7^{9}

=== Bottom half ===
==== Section 5 ====
First round
(France) A Rinderknech	3	6^{5}
(Spain) J Munar	6	7^{7}
(France) G Monfils	6	3	6
(Hungary) F Marozsán	3	6	4
WC	(United States) E Spizzirri	7^{7}	3	6
Q	(United Kingdom) B Harris	6^{2}	6	2
Q	(Chinese Taipei) C-h Tseng	7^{7}	6
(Italy) M Bellucci	6^{5}	2

Second round
7	D Medvedev	2	3
(Spain) J Munar	6	6
(France) G Monfils	6	3	7^{10}
26	(Czech Republic) J Lehečka	1	6	6^{8}
24	(United States) S Korda	6	6
WC	(United States) E Spizzirri	4	2
Q	(Chinese Taipei) C-h Tseng	6	5	3
9	(Greece) S Tsitsipas	4	7	6

Third round
(Spain) J Munar	5	7	6^{1}
(France) G Monfils	7	5	7^{7}
24	(United States) S Korda	7^{7}	6
9	(Greece) S Tsitsipas	6^{4}	3

Fourth round
(France) G Monfils	4	6	4
24	(United States) S Korda	6	2	6

==== Section 6 ====
First round
(Brazil) T Seyboth Wild	3	4
(France) Q Halys	6	6
Q	(Australia) T Schoolkate	6	6
Q	(United States) E Quinn	0	2
LL	(Argentina) C Ugo Carabelli	2	7^{7}	6
Q	(United States) B Holt	6	6^{5}	4
(Australia) R Hijikata	7	3	7
(Serbia) H Medjedovic	5	6	5

Second round
15	(Italy) L Musetti	3	7^{7}	7
(France) Q Halys	6	6^{4}	5
Q	(Australia) T Schoolkate	4	4
18	(Canada) F Auger-Aliassime	6	6
32	(United States) A Michelsen	7^{7}	5	3
LL	(Argentina) C Ugo Carabelli	6^{3}	7	6
(Australia) R Hijikata	0	6^{1}
4	(Serbia) N Djokovic	6	7^{7}

Third round
15	(Italy) L Musetti	4	6	6
18	(Canada) F Auger-Aliassime	6	2	3
LL	(Argentina) C Ugo Carabelli	1	6^{1}
4	(Serbia) N Djokovic	6	7^{7}

Fourth round
15	(Italy) L Musetti	2	2
4	(Serbia) N Djokovic	6	6

==== Section 7 ====
First round
(United States) A Kovacevic	4	4
(Serbia) M Kecmanović	6	6
Q	(Belgium) A Blockx	6^{5}	4
(France) C Moutet	7^{7}	6
(France) A Müller	6	6
Q	(Japan) R Sakamoto	4	4
(Kazakhstan) A Bublik	6	6
(Argentina) S Báez	3	4

Second round
5	(Norway) C Ruud	3	6	6
(Serbia) M Kecmanović	6	4	4
(France) C Moutet	7	3	5
30	(Chile) A Tabilo	5	6	7
23	(Argentina) F Cerúndolo	6	6
(France) A Müller	1	2
(Kazakhstan) A Bublik	7	5	4
12	(United States) T Paul	5	7	6

Third round
5	(Norway) C Ruud	6	7^{7}
30	(Chile) A Tabilo	4	6^{4}
23	(Argentina) F Cerúndolo	6	7^{7}
12	(United States) T Paul	2	6^{4}

Fourth round
5	(Norway) C Ruud	4	2
23	(Argentina) F Cerúndolo	6	6

==== Section 8 ====
First round
Q	(Argentina) F Comesaña	6^{4}	6^{2}
WC	(Italy) F Cinà	7^{7}	7^{7}
Q	(United States) M McDonald	6	3	4
PR	(Australia) N Kyrgios	3	6	6
Q	(Australia) C O'Connell	3	6	6^{5}
(Spain) R Carballés Baena	6	3	7^{7}
(Australia) A Vukic	6	4	2
(Belgium) D Goffin	2	6	6

Second round
14	(Bulgaria) G Dimitrov	6	6
WC	(Italy) F Cinà	1	4
PR	(Australia) N Kyrgios	6^{3}	0
22	K Khachanov	7^{7}	6
31	(United States) B Nakashima	6	4	6
(Spain) R Carballés Baena	4	6	3
(Belgium) D Goffin	5	6	6
2	(Spain) C Alcaraz	7	4	3

Third round
14	(Bulgaria) G Dimitrov	6^{3}	6	7
22	K Khachanov	7^{7}	4	5
31	(United States) B Nakashima	6	6^{5}	6
(Belgium) D Goffin	3	7^{7}	3

Fourth round
14	(Bulgaria) G Dimitrov	6	7
31	(United States) B Nakashima	4	5

== Seeded players ==
The following are the seeded players. Seedings are based on ATP rankings as of 17 March 2025. Rankings and points before are as of 17 March 2025.

^{†}	Runner-up

Seed	Rank	Player	Points before	Points defending	Points earned	Points after	Status
1	2	(Germany) Alexander Zverev	7,945	400	100	7,645	Fourth round lost to (France) Arthur Fils [17]
2	3	(Spain) Carlos Alcaraz	6,910	200	10	6,720	Second round lost to (Belgium) David Goffin
3	4	(United States) Taylor Fritz	4,900	10	400	5,290	Semifinals lost to (Czech Republic) Jakub Menšík
4	5	(Serbia) Novak Djokovic ^{†}	3,860	0	650	4,510	Runner-up, lost to (Czech Republic) Jakub Menšík
5	6	(Norway) Casper Ruud	3,855	100	100	3,855	Fourth round lost to (Argentina) Francisco Cerúndolo [23]
6	7	(United Kingdom) Jack Draper	3,800	30	10	3,780	Second round lost to (Czech Republic) Jakub Menšík
7	8	Daniil Medvedev	3,680	400	10	3,290	Second round lost to (Spain) Jaume Munar
8	9	Andrey Rublev	3,440	10	10	3,440	Second round lost to (Belgium) Zizou Bergs
9	10	(Greece) Stefanos Tsitsipas	3,405	10	50	3,445	Third round lost to (United States) Sebastian Korda [24]
10	11	(Australia) Alex de Minaur	3,335	100	100	3,335	Fourth round lost to (Italy) Matteo Berrettini [29]
11	12	(Denmark) Holger Rune	3,270	10	10	3,270	Second round lost to (United States) Reilly Opelka [PR]
12	13	(United States) Tommy Paul	3,030	10	50	3,070	Third round lost to (Argentina) Francisco Cerúndolo [23]
13	14	(United States) Ben Shelton	2,980	50	10	2,940	Second round lost to (Hong Kong) Coleman Wong [WC]
14	15	(Bulgaria) Grigor Dimitrov	2,745	650	400	2,495	Semifinals lost to (Serbia) Novak Djokovic [4]
15	16	(Italy) Lorenzo Musetti	2,650	100	100	2,650	Fourth round lost to (Serbia) Novak Djokovic [4]
16	17	(United States) Frances Tiafoe	2,485	10	50	2,525	Third round lost to (France) Arthur Fils [17]
17	18	(France) Arthur Fils	2,480	10	200	2,670	Quarterfinals lost to (Czech Republic) Jakub Menšík
18	19	(Canada) Félix Auger-Aliassime	2,415	(50)^{†}	50	2,415	Third round lost to (Italy) Lorenzo Musetti [15]
19	20	(France) Ugo Humbert	2,375	50	10	2,335	Second round lost to (Brazil) João Fonseca
20	21	(Czech Republic) Tomáš Macháč	2,310	200	100	2,210	Fourth round withdrew due to illness
21	22	(Poland) Hubert Hurkacz	2,205	100	0	2,105	Withdrew due to lower back injury
22	23	Karen Khachanov	2,000	100	50	1,950	Third round lost to (Bulgaria) Grigor Dimitrov [14]
23	24	(Argentina) Francisco Cerúndolo	1,925	50	200	2,075	Quarterfinals lost to (Bulgaria) Grigor Dimitrov [14]
24	25	(United States) Sebastian Korda	1,860	50	200	2,010	Quarterfinals lost to (Serbia) Novak Djokovic [4]
25	26	(Australia) Alexei Popyrin	1,800	50	10	1,760	Second round lost to Roman Safiullin
26	27	(Czech Republic) Jiří Lehečka	1,745	10	10	1,745	Second round lost to (France) Gaël Monfils
27	28	(Canada) Denis Shapovalov	1,716	50	50	1,716	Third round lost to (United States) Taylor Fritz [3]
28	29	(France) Giovanni Mpetshi Perricard	1,656	(22)^{‡}	10	1,644	Second round lost to (Australia) Jordan Thompson
29	30	(Italy) Matteo Berrettini	1,580	10	200	1,770	Quarterfinals lost to (United States) Taylor Fritz [3]
30	31	(Chile) Alejandro Tabilo	1,555	30	50	1,575	Third round lost to (Norway) Casper Ruud [5]
31	32	(United States) Brandon Nakashima	1,500	30	100	1,570	Fourth round lost to (Bulgaria) Grigor Dimitrov [14]
32	33	(United States) Alex Michelsen	1,465	30	10	1,445	Second round lost to (Argentina) Camilo Ugo Carabelli [LL]

† The player's 2024 points were replaced by a better result for purposes of his ranking as of March 17, 2025. Points for his 19th best result will be deducted instead.
‡ The player did not qualify for the main draw in 2024. He is defending points from the ATP Challenger Tour event in San Luis Potosí instead.

=== Withdrawn seeded players ===
The following player would have been seeded, but withdrew before the tournament began.

Rank	Player	Points before	Points dropping	Points after	Withdrawal reason
1	(Italy) Jannik Sinner	11,330	1,000	10,330	Suspension for doping violation

== Other entry information ==
=== Wildcards ===
- (Italy) Federico Cinà
- (United States) Christopher Eubanks
- (United States) Eliot Spizzirri
- (Hong Kong) Coleman Wong
- (China) Wu Yibing

=== Protected ranking ===
- (United States) Jenson Brooksby
- (Australia) Nick Kyrgios
- (United States) Reilly Opelka

=== Withdrawals ===
- § (Netherlands) Tallon Griekspoor → replaced by (Canada) Gabriel Diallo (LL)
- § (Poland) Hubert Hurkacz → replaced by (Australia) Adam Walton (LL)
- § (Chile) Nicolás Jarry → replaced by (Argentina) Camilo Ugo Carabelli (LL)
- ‡ (Australia) Thanasi Kokkinakis → replaced by (Australia) Rinky Hijikata
- § (Japan) Kei Nishikori → replaced by (France) Hugo Gaston (LL)
- ‡ (China) Shang Juncheng → replaced by (France) Quentin Halys
- ‡ (Italy) Jannik Sinner → replaced by (United States) Aleksandar Kovacevic
- ‡ (China) Zhang Zhizhen → replaced by (United States) Learner Tien

‡ – withdrew from entry list
§ – withdrew from main draw

== Qualifying ==
=== Seeds ===
1. (Argentina) Camilo Ugo Carabelli (qualifying competition, lucky loser)
2. (Argentina) Francisco Comesaña (qualified)
3. (Italy) Luca Nardi (first round)
4. (Australia) Christopher O'Connell (qualified)
5. (United Kingdom) Jacob Fearnley (qualified)
6. (Canada) Gabriel Diallo (qualifying competition, lucky loser)
7. (France) Hugo Gaston (qualifying competition, lucky loser)
8. (Australia) Adam Walton (qualifying competition, lucky loser)
9. (Australia) James Duckworth (qualifying competition)
10. (Kazakhstan) Alexander Shevchenko (qualifying competition)
11. (Chinese Taipei) Tseng Chun-hsin (qualified)
12. Pavel Kotov (qualifying competition)
13. (United Kingdom) Billy Harris (qualified)
14. (Serbia) Dušan Lajović (first round)
15. (United States) Mackenzie McDonald (qualified)
16. (Germany) Yannick Hanfmann (first round)
17. (United States) Brandon Holt (qualified)
18. (Finland) Otto Virtanen (first round)
19. (Japan) Taro Daniel (first round)
20. (United States) Tristan Boyer (qualifying competition)
21. (Switzerland) Alexander Ritschard (first round)
22. (Poland) Kamil Majchrzak (first round)
23. (France) Adrian Mannarino (first round)
24. (Australia) Tristan Schoolkate (qualified)

=== Qualifiers ===
1. (United States) Ethan Quinn
2. (Argentina) Francisco Comesaña
3. (Belgium) Alexander Blockx
4. (Australia) Christopher O'Connell
5. (United Kingdom) Jacob Fearnley
6. (United States) Brandon Holt
7. (United Kingdom) Billy Harris
8. (Australia) Tristan Schoolkate
9. (Japan) Rei Sakamoto
10. (Argentina) Thiago Agustín Tirante
11. (Chinese Taipei) Tseng Chun-hsin
12. (United States) Mackenzie McDonald

=== Lucky losers ===
1. (Argentina) Camilo Ugo Carabelli
2. (Canada) Gabriel Diallo
3. (France) Hugo Gaston
4. (Australia) Adam Walton

=== Qualifying draw ===
==== First qualifier ====
First round
1	(Argentina) Camilo Ugo Carabelli	6	3	6
(United States) Mitchell Krueger	2	6	3
(United States) Ethan Quinn	3	6	6
23	(France) Adrian Mannarino	6	4	2

Qualifying competition
1	(Argentina) Camilo Ugo Carabelli	6^{2}	6	2
(United States) Ethan Quinn	7^{7}	3	6

==== Second qualifier ====
First round
2	(Argentina) Francisco Comesaña	6	6
PR	(United States) Michael Mmoh	3	4
(Japan) Shintaro Mochizuki	7^{7}	6
16	(Germany) Yannick Hanfmann	6^{5}	4

Qualifying competition
2	(Argentina) Francisco Comesaña	7^{7}	7
(Japan) Shintaro Mochizuki	6^{4}	5

==== Third qualifier ====
First round
3	(Italy) Luca Nardi	3	6^{4}
(France) Térence Atmane	6	7^{7}
(Belgium) Alexander Blockx	3	6	6
18	(Finland) Otto Virtanen	6	4	3

Qualifying competition
(France) Térence Atmane	4	4
(Belgium) Alexander Blockx	6	6

==== Fourth qualifier ====
First round
4	(Australia) Christopher O'Connell	7	6
Alt	(Canada) Liam Draxl	5	0
(Argentina) Marco Trungelliti	6	5	6
21	(Switzerland) Alexander Ritschard	4	7	3

Qualifying competition
4	(Australia) Christopher O'Connell	6	6
(Argentina) Marco Trungelliti	2	3

==== Fifth qualifier ====
First round
5	(United Kingdom) Jacob Fearnley	6	6
WC	(Netherlands) Thijs Boogaard	4	3
(Japan) Yasutaka Uchiyama	3	7^{7}	1
20	(United States) Tristan Boyer	6	6^{2}	6

Qualifying competition
5	(United Kingdom) Jacob Fearnley	6	6
20	(United States) Tristan Boyer	2	4

==== Sixth qualifier ====
First round
6	(Canada) Gabriel Diallo	6	6^{3}	6
PR	(Japan) Yosuke Watanuki	1	7^{7}	3
WC	(United States) Martin Damm	6	2	2
17	(United States) Brandon Holt	4	6	6

Qualifying competition
6	(Canada) Gabriel Diallo	4	6	5
17	(United States) Brandon Holt	6	2	7

==== Seventh qualifier ====
First round
7	(France) Hugo Gaston	6	6
(Lebanon) Hady Habib	2	4
WC	(Sweden) Mikael Ymer	7^{8}	6^{5}	3
13	(United Kingdom) Billy Harris	6^{6}	7^{7}	6

Qualifying competition
7	(France) Hugo Gaston	5	2
13	(United Kingdom) Billy Harris	7	6

==== Eighth qualifier ====
First round
8	(Australia) Adam Walton	6	6
(Kazakhstan) Mikhail Kukushkin	1	4
PR	(Italy) Stefano Napolitano	3	7^{7}	1
24	(Australia) Tristan Schoolkate	6	6^{5}	6

Qualifying competition
8	(Australia) Adam Walton	3	4
24	(Australia) Tristan Schoolkate	6	6

==== Ninth qualifier ====
First round
9	(Australia) James Duckworth	7	7
(Argentina) Federico Agustín Gómez	5	5
WC	(Japan) Rei Sakamoto	6	6^{5}	6
22	(Poland) Kamil Majchrzak	4	7^{7}	2

Qualifying competition
9	(Australia) James Duckworth	5	6^{5}
WC	(Japan) Rei Sakamoto	7	7^{7}

==== Tenth qualifier ====
First round
10	(Kazakhstan) Alexander Shevchenko	6	7^{7}
(Slovakia) Lukáš Klein	3	6^{5}
(Argentina) Thiago Agustín Tirante	6	6
14	(Serbia) Dušan Lajović	4	3

Qualifying competition
10	(Kazakhstan) Alexander Shevchenko	3	3
(Argentina) Thiago Agustín Tirante	6	6

==== Eleventh qualifier ====
First round
11	(Chinese Taipei) Tseng Chun-hsin	7^{8}	6
(Spain) Alejandro Moro Cañas	6^{6}	2
WC	(United States) Darwin Blanch	6^{8}	6	6
19	(Japan) Taro Daniel	7^{10}	0	3

Qualifying competition
11	(Chinese Taipei) Tseng Chun-hsin	6	1	7^{7}
WC	(United States) Darwin Blanch	4	6	6^{4}

==== Twelfth qualifier ====
First round
12	Pavel Kotov	4	6	6
(Canada) Alexis Galarneau	6	2	1
(Georgia (country)) Nikoloz Basilashvili	1	7^{7}	2^{r}
15	(United States) Mackenzie McDonald	6	6^{4}	3

Qualifying competition
12	Pavel Kotov	2	2
15	(United States) Mackenzie McDonald	6	6
