= 2026 Fort Worth Challenger =

- Date: October 19 – 25
- Edition: 1st
- Surface: Hard
- Location: Fort Worth, Texas, United States

Champions

Singles
- (United States) Jenson Brooksby

Doubles
- (Spain) Albert Pedrico Kravtsov / (United States) Cooper Woestendick
- Fort Worth Challenger

The 2026 Fort Worth Challenger was a professional tennis tournament played on hard courts. It was the first edition of the tournament as part of the ATP Challenger Tour. It took place in Fort Worth, Texas, United States from October 19 to 25, 2026.

== Singles main-draw entrants ==
=== Seeds ===
| Country | Player | Rank^{1} | Seed |
|---|---|---|---|
| USA | Jenson Brooksby | 102 | 1 |
| USA | Darwin Blanch | 159 | 2 |
| USA | Braden Shick | 211 | 3 |
| USA | Colton Smith | 212 | 4 |
| USA | J. J. Wolf | 223 | 5 |
| USA | Murphy Cassone | 273 | 6 |
| BRA | Igor Marcondes | 274 | 7 |
| GER | Max Hans Rehberg | 280 | 8 |

- ^{1} Rankings are as of October 5, 2026.

=== Other entrants ===
The following players received wildcards into the singles main draw:

- (United States) Sebastian Gorzny
- (France) Cosme Rolland de Ravel
- (United States) Trevor Svajda

The following players received entry into the singles main draw using protected rankings:

- (France) Gabriel Debru
- (United States) Patrick Maloney
- (United States) Govind Nanda

The following player received entry into the singles main draw as an alternate:

- (United States) Ozan Baris

The following players received entry from the qualifying draw:

- Erik Arutiunian
- (United States) Kaylan Bigun
- (Netherlands) Sander Jong
- (Spain) Albert Pedrico Kravtsov
- (United States) Alex Rybakov
- (United States) Gavin Young

The following player received entry as a lucky loser:

- (Japan) Kenta Miyoshi

== Champions ==
=== Singles ===
- (United States) Jenson Brooksby def. (United States) Darwin Blanch 6–1, 6–4.

=== Doubles ===
- (Spain) Albert Pedrico Kravtsov / (United States) Cooper Woestendick def. (United Kingdom) James Hopper / (Japan) Shunsuke Mitsui via walkover.
