= 2026 BNP Paribas Open – Men's singles =

Tennis tournament event

Men's singles
- 2026 BNP Paribas Open

Final
- Champion: (Italy) Jannik Sinner
- Runner-up: Daniil Medvedev
- Score: 7–6^{(8–6)}, 7–6^{(7–4)}

Details
- Draw: 96 (12 Q / 8 WC )
- Seeds: 32

Events
Singles	men	women
Doubles	men	women	mixed
- Indian Wells Open

Jannik Sinner defeated Daniil Medvedev in the final, 7–6^{(8–6)}, 7–6^{(7–4)} to win the men's singles tennis title at the 2026 Indian Wells Open. It was his sixth ATP 1000 title and 25th career title overall. He did not lose a set en route to the title, becoming the first man in history to win two consecutive ATP Masters 1000 tournaments without dropping a set. Sinner was the third—and youngest—man (after Roger Federer and Novak Djokovic) to win all six hardcourt ATP 1000 events, since the series began in 1990, and all nine hardcourt Big Titles (the six ATP Masters 1000 events, Australian Open, US Open and ATP Finals).

Jack Draper was the defending champion, but lost in the quarterfinals to Medvedev.

Carlos Alcaraz became the youngest man to reach five consecutive semifinals at a single ATP 1000 tournament, surpassing the previous record held by Rafael Nadal at the Monte-Carlo Masters, and was the third—and youngest—man (after Nadal and Djokovic) to reach five consecutive Indian Wells semifinals. Alexander Zverev was the fifth man to reach the semifinals of all nine ATP 1000 tournaments, and the first player outside of the Big Four to do so.

== Seeds ==
All seeds received a bye into the second round.

1. (Spain) Carlos Alcaraz (semifinals)
2. (Italy) Jannik Sinner (champion)
3. (Serbia) Novak Djokovic (fourth round)
4. (Germany) Alexander Zverev (semifinals)
5. (Italy) Lorenzo Musetti (second round)
6. (Australia) Alex de Minaur (third round)
7. (United States) Taylor Fritz (third round)
8. (United States) Ben Shelton (third round)
9. (Canada) Félix Auger-Aliassime (fourth round)
10. (Kazakhstan) Alexander Bublik (third round)
11. Daniil Medvedev (final)
12. (Czech Republic) Jakub Menšík (third round)
13. (Norway) Casper Ruud (fourth round)
14. (United Kingdom) Jack Draper (quarterfinals)
15. (Italy) Flavio Cobolli (third round)
16. Karen Khachanov (second round)
17. Andrey Rublev (second round)
18. (Spain) Alejandro Davidovich Fokina (fourth round)
19. (Argentina) Francisco Cerúndolo (third round)
20. (Italy) Luciano Darderi (second round)
21. (United States) Frances Tiafoe (fourth round)
22. (Czech Republic) Jiří Lehečka (second round)
23. (United States) Tommy Paul (third round)
24. (Monaco) Valentin Vacherot (third round)
25. (United States) Learner Tien (quarterfinals)
26. (France) Arthur Rinderknech (third round)
27. (United Kingdom) Cameron Norrie (quarterfinals)
28. (United States) Brandon Nakashima (third round)
29. (Argentina) Tomás Martín Etcheverry (second round)
30. (France) Arthur Fils (quarterfinals)
31. (France) Corentin Moutet (second round)
32. (France) Ugo Humbert (second round)

Click on the seed number of a player to go to their draw section.

== Draw ==
Key

- Q = Qualifier
- WC = Wild card
- LL = Lucky loser
- Alt = Alternate
- ITF = ITF entry
- PR = Protected ranking
- SR = Special ranking
- SE = Special exempt
- JE = Junior exempt
- JR = Junior Accelerator Programme entrant
- CO = College Accelerator Programme entrant
- NG = Next Gen Accelerator Program entrant
- w/o = Walkover
- r = Retired
- d = Defaulted

=== Finals ===
Quarterfinals
1	(Spain) Carlos Alcaraz	6	6
27	(United Kingdom) Cameron Norrie	3	4
14	(United Kingdom) Jack Draper	1	5
11	Daniil Medvedev	6	7
30	(France) Arthur Fils	2	3
4	(Germany) Alexander Zverev	6	6
25	(United States) Learner Tien	1	2
2	(Italy) Jannik Sinner	6	6

Semifinals
1	(Spain) Carlos Alcaraz	3	6^{3}
11	Daniil Medvedev	6	7^{7}
4	(Germany) Alexander Zverev	2	4
2	(Italy) Jannik Sinner	6	6

Final
11	Daniil Medvedev	6^{6}	6^{4}
2	(Italy) Jannik Sinner	7^{8}	7^{7}

=== Top half ===
==== Section 1 ====
First round
(France) T Atmane	4	7	4
(Bulgaria) G Dimitrov	6	5	6
(Argentina) JM Cerúndolo	7^{7}	6^{5}	6
(Netherlands) B van de Zandschulp	6^{3}	7^{7}	3
(Portugal) N Borges	7^{11}	7
(United States) E Nava	6^{9}	5
(Kazakhstan) A Shevchenko	6	3	6
Q	(Japan) S Shimabukuro	4	6	2

Second round
1	(Spain) C Alcaraz	6	6
(Bulgaria) G Dimitrov	2	3
(Argentina) JM Cerúndolo
26	(France) A Rinderknech	w/o
24	(Monaco) V Vacherot	7	7
(Portugal) N Borges	5	5
(Kazakhstan) A Shevchenko	1	6^{4}
13	(Norway) C Ruud	6	7^{7}

Third round
1	(Spain) C Alcaraz	6^{6}	6	6
26	(France) A Rinderknech	7^{8}	3	2
24	(Monaco) V Vacherot	6	3	4
13	(Norway) C Ruud	3	6	6

Fourth round
1	(Spain) C Alcaraz	6	7^{7}
13	(Norway) C Ruud	1	6^{2}

==== Section 2 ====
First round
WC	(United States) M Zheng	6^{1}	5
LL	(Czech Republic) V Kopřiva	7^{7}	7
Q	(Italy) F Maestrelli	6^{5}	4
Q	(Australia) R Hijikata	7^{7}	6
(Italy) M Arnaldi	0	1
Q	(United States) M McDonald	6	6
(United States) S Korda	7	6
(Argentina) F Comesaña	5	0

Second round
10	(Kazakhstan) A Bublik	3	7^{7}	6
LL	(Czech Republic) V Kopřiva	6	6^{3}	2
Q	(Australia) R Hijikata	4	6	6
20	(Italy) L Darderi	6	2	4
27	(United Kingdom) C Norrie	6	6
Q	(United States) M McDonald	2	3
(United States) S Korda	6	4	4
6	(Australia) A de Minaur	4	6	6

Third round
10	(Kazakhstan) A Bublik	7^{7}	6^{3}	3
Q	(Australia) R Hijikata	6^{3}	7^{7}	6
27	(United Kingdom) C Norrie	6	6
6	(Australia) A de Minaur	4	4

Fourth round
Q	(Australia) R Hijikata	4	2
27	(United Kingdom) C Norrie	6	6

==== Section 3 ====
First round
(Poland) K Majchrzak	6	1	7
(France) G Mpetshi Perricard	3	6	5
(Poland) H Hurkacz	6^{6}	6^{4}
(United States) A Kovacevic	7^{8}	7^{7}
(France) V Royer	4	3
Q	(France) B Bonzi	6	6
(Hungary) F Marozsán	4	7^{7}	4
(Spain) R Bautista Agut	6	6^{2}	6

Second round
3	(Serbia) N Djokovic	4	6	6
(Poland) K Majchrzak	6	1	2
(United States) A Kovacevic	6	6
31	(France) C Moutet	1	4
19	(Argentina) F Cerúndolo	6	5	7^{7}
Q	(France) B Bonzi	4	7	6^{5}
(Spain) R Bautista Agut	6	3	2
14	(United Kingdom) J Draper	3	6	6

Third round
3	(Serbia) N Djokovic	6	1	6
(United States) A Kovacevic	4	6	4
19	(Argentina) F Cerúndolo	1	5
14	(United Kingdom) J Draper	6	7

Fourth round
3	(Serbia) N Djokovic	6	4	6^{5}
14	(United Kingdom) J Draper	4	6	7^{7}

==== Section 4 ====
First round
(Chile) A Tabilo	6	6
WC	(Spain) R Jódar	1	2
Q	(Chinese Taipei) C-h Tseng	3	2
(Argentina) S Báez	6	6
Q	(Spain) D Mérida	3	4
(United States) A Michelsen	6	6
(United Kingdom) J Fearnley	6	6
(Bosnia and Herzegovina) D Džumhur	3	3

Second round
11	D Medvedev	6	6
(Chile) A Tabilo	4	2
(Argentina) S Báez	6	6
22	(Czech Republic) J Lehečka	4	1
32	(France) U Humbert	5	7^{7}	6^{6}
(United States) A Michelsen	7	6^{5}	7^{8}
(United Kingdom) J Fearnley	3	7^{10}	1
7	(United States) T Fritz	6	6^{8}	6

Third round
11	D Medvedev	6	6
(Argentina) S Báez	4	0
(United States) A Michelsen	6	7^{8}
7	(United States) T Fritz	4	6^{6}

Fourth round
11	D Medvedev	6	6
(United States) A Michelsen	2	4

=== Bottom half ===
==== Section 5 ====
First round
(Hungary) M Fucsovics	7	6
Q	(Australia) C O'Connell	5	3
Q	(Croatia) D Prižmić	7^{7}	3	7
Q	(Australia) T Schoolkate	6^{5}	6	5
(Italy) M Bellucci	6^{5}	4
(Canada) G Diallo	7^{7}	6
WC	(France) G Monfils	6	6
Q	(Canada) A Galarneau	3	4

Second round
5	(Italy) L Musetti	5	1
(Hungary) M Fucsovics	7	6
Q	(Croatia) D Prižmić	2	2^{r}
30	(France) A Fils	6	3
17	A Rublev	7^{7}	6^{1}	3
(Canada) G Diallo	6^{4}	7^{7}	6
WC	(France) G Monfils	7^{7}	3	4
9	(Canada) F Auger-Aliassime	6^{5}	6	6

Third round
(Hungary) M Fucsovics	3	5
30	(France) A Fils	6	7
(Canada) G Diallo	7^{7}	3	3
9	(Canada) F Auger-Aliassime	6^{5}	6	6

Fourth round
30	(France) A Fils	6	7^{11}
9	(Canada) F Auger-Aliassime	3	6^{9}

==== Section 6 ====
First round
(Germany) D Altmaier	3	0^{r}
(Serbia) M Kecmanović	6	1
(United States) J Brooksby	6	6
(Australia) A Popyrin	3	4
(Argentina) C Ugo Carabelli	7^{7}	6
WC	(United States) M Damm	6^{5}	3
(Italy) M Berrettini	4	7	7
(France) A Mannarino	6	5	5

Second round
15	(Italy) F Cobolli	3	6	6
(Serbia) M Kecmanović	6	3	4
(United States) J Brooksby	4	2
21	(United States) F Tiafoe	6	6
28	(United States) B Nakashima	6	6
(Argentina) C Ugo Carabelli	3	4
(Italy) M Berrettini	3	4
4	(Germany) A Zverev	6	6

Third round
15	(Italy) F Cobolli	1	2
21	(United States) F Tiafoe	6	6
28	(United States) B Nakashima	6^{2}	7	4
4	(Germany) A Zverev	7^{7}	5	6

Fourth round
21	(United States) F Tiafoe	3	4
4	(Germany) A Zverev	6	6

==== Section 7 ====
First round
(United States) R Opelka	7	7^{7}
(United States) E Quinn	5	6^{3}
(France) Q Halys	3	3
(Australia) A Walton	6	6
WC	(United States) Z Svajda	7^{7}	6
(Croatia) M Čilić	6^{5}	4
(Argentina) M Navone	6	5	3
(United States) M Giron	4	7	6

Second round
8	(United States) B Shelton	6^{3}	7^{7}	6
(United States) R Opelka	7^{7}	6^{4}	3
(Australia) A Walton	6^{3}	6^{8}
25	(United States) L Tien	7^{7}	7^{10}
18	(Spain) A Davidovich Fokina	7^{7}	6
WC	(United States) Z Svajda	6^{0}	2
(United States) M Giron	5	6^{4}
12	(Czech Republic) J Menšík	7	7^{7}

Third round
8	(United States) B Shelton	6^{3}	6	3
25	(United States) L Tien	7^{7}	4	6
18	(Spain) A Davidovich Fokina	6	4	6
12	(Czech Republic) J Menšík	2	6	2

Fourth round
25	(United States) L Tien	4	6	7^{7}
18	(Spain) A Davidovich Fokina	6	1	6^{4}

==== Section 8 ====
First round
(Brazil) J Fonseca	7^{7}	6
(Belgium) R Collignon	6^{2}	4
(Belgium) Z Bergs	6	6
(Germany) J-L Struff	3	4
(Greece) S Tsitsipas	2	6	4
(Canada) D Shapovalov	6	3	6
Q	(Czech Republic) D Svrčina	6	6
(Australia) J Duckworth	2	4

Second round
16	K Khachanov	6	6^{7}	4
(Brazil) J Fonseca	4	7^{9}	6
(Belgium) Z Bergs	1	2
23	(United States) T Paul	6	6
29	(Argentina) TM Etcheverry	3	6	6^{5}
(Canada) D Shapovalov	6	2	7^{7}
Q	(Czech Republic) D Svrčina	1	1
2	(Italy) J Sinner	6	6

Third round
(Brazil) J Fonseca	6	6
23	(United States) T Paul	2	3
(Canada) D Shapovalov	3	2
2	(Italy) J Sinner	6	6

Fourth round
(Brazil) J Fonseca	6^{6}	6^{4}
2	(Italy) J Sinner	7^{8}	7^{7}

== Seeded players ==
The following are the seeded players. Seedings are based on ATP rankings as of March 2, 2026. Rankings and points before are as of March 2, 2026

^{‡}	Champion
^{†}	Runner-up

Seed	Rank	Player	Points before	Points defending	Points won	Points after	Status
1	1	(Spain) Carlos Alcaraz	13,550	400	400	13,550	Semifinals lost to Daniil Medvedev [11]
2	2	(Italy) Jannik Sinner^{‡}	10,400	0	1,000	11,400	Champion, defeated Daniil Medvedev [11]
3	3	(Serbia) Novak Djokovic	5,280	10	100	5,370	Fourth round lost to (United Kingdom) Jack Draper [14]
4	4	(Germany) Alexander Zverev	4,555	(50)^{∆}	400	4,905	Semifinals lost to (Italy) Jannik Sinner [2]
5	5	(Italy) Lorenzo Musetti	4,405	50	10	4,365	Second round lost to (Hungary) Márton Fucsovics
6	6	(Australia) Alex de Minaur	4,235	100	50	4,185	Third round lost to (United Kingdom) Cameron Norrie [27]
7	7	(United States) Taylor Fritz	4,220	100	50	4,170	Third round lost to (United States) Alex Michelsen
8	8	(United States) Ben Shelton	4,010	200	50	3,860	Third round lost to (United States) Learner Tien [25]
9	9	(Canada) Felix Auger-Aliassime	3,950	(50)^{∆}	100	4,000	Fourth round lost to (France) Arthur Fils [30]
10	10	(Kazakhstan) Alexander Bublik	3,405	(30+90)^{∆Ω}	50+50	3,385	Third round lost to (Australia) Rinky Hijikata [Q]
11	11	Daniil Medvedev^{†}	3,360	400	650	3,610	Runner-up, lost to (Italy) Jannik Sinner [2]
12	12	(Czech Republic) Jakub Menšík	2,650	(50)^{Ω}	50	2,650	Third round lost to (Spain) Alejandro Davidovich Fokina [18]
13	13	(Norway) Casper Ruud	2,625	10	100	2,715	Fourth round lost to (Spain) Carlos Alcaraz [1]
14	14	(United Kingdom) Jack Draper	2,510	1,000	200	1,710	Quarterfinals lost to Daniil Medvedev [11]
15	15	(Italy) Flavio Cobolli	2,480	10	50	2,520	Third round lost to (United States) Frances Tiafoe [21]
16	16	Karen Khachanov	2,450	50	10	2,410	Second round lost to (Brazil) João Fonseca
17	17	Andrey Rublev	2,400	10	10	2,400	Second round lost to (Canada) Gabriel Diallo
18	19	(Spain) Alejandro Davidovich Fokina	2,190	(30)^{∆}	100	2,260	Fourth round lost to (United States) Learner Tien [25]
19	20	(Argentina) Francisco Cerúndolo	2,170	200	50	2,020	Third round lost to (United Kingdom) Jack Draper [14]
20	21	(Italy) Luciano Darderi	2,104	(30)^{∆}	10	2,084	Second round lost to (Australia) Rinky Hijikata [Q]
21	22	(United States) Frances Tiafoe	1,870	50	100	1,920	Fourth round lost to (Germany) Alexander Zverev [4]
22	23	(Czech Republic) Jiří Lehečka	1,850	10	10	1,850	Second round lost to (Argentina) Sebastián Báez
23	24	(United States) Tommy Paul	1,815	100	50	1,765	Third round lost to (Brazil) João Fonseca
24	26	(Monaco) Valentin Vacherot	1,691	(0)^{∆}	50	1,741	Third round lost to (Norway) Casper Ruud [13]
25	27	(United States) Learner Tien	1,685	(25)^{∆}	200	1,860	Quarterfinals lost to (Italy) Jannik Sinner [2]
26	28	(France) Arthur Rinderknech	1,617	10	50	1,657	Third round lost to (Spain) Carlos Alcaraz [1]
27	29	(United Kingdom) Cameron Norrie	1,603	50	200	1,753	Quarterfinals lost to (Spain) Carlos Alcaraz [1]
28	30	(United States) Brandon Nakashima	1,535	100	50	1,485	Third round lost to (Germany) Alexander Zverev [4]
29	31	(Argentina) Tomás Martín Etcheverry	1,445	(25)^{∆}	10	1,430	Second round lost to (Canada) Denis Shapovalov
30	32	(France) Arthur Fils	1,440	200	200	1,440	Quarterfinals lost to (Germany) Alexander Zverev [4]
31	33	(France) Corentin Moutet	1,383	30	10	1,363	Second round lost to (United States) Aleksandar Kovacevic
32	34	(France) Ugo Humbert	1,285	50	10	1,245	Second round lost to (United States) Alex Michelsen

∆ The player is defending points from his 18th best tournament.
Ω The player is defending points from an ATP Challenger Tour event.

=== Withdrawn seeded players ===
The following players would have been seeded, but withdrew before the tournament began.

Rank	Player	Points before	Points defending	Points after	Withdrawal reason
18	(Denmark) Holger Rune	2,290	650	1,640	Left achilles tendon injury
25	(Netherlands) Tallon Griekspoor	1,785	200	1,585	Left hamstring injury

== Other entry information ==
=== Wildcards ===
- (United States) Martin Damm
- (Spain) Rafael Jódar
- (France) Gaël Monfils
- (United States) Zachary Svajda
- (United States) Michael Zheng

=== Withdrawals ===
- † (France) Arthur Cazaux → replaced by (Czech Republic) Vít Kopřiva (LL)
- ‡ (Netherlands) Tallon Griekspoor → replaced by (Spain) Roberto Bautista Agut
- ‡ (Czech Republic) Tomáš Macháč → replaced by (United States) Emilio Nava
- ‡ (Spain) Pedro Martínez → replaced by (United Kingdom) Jacob Fearnley
- ‡ (Austria) Filip Misolic → replaced by (Australia) Adam Walton
- ‡ (France) Alexandre Müller → replaced by (Germany) Jan-Lennard Struff
- ‡ (Spain) Jaume Munar → replaced by (United States) Aleksandar Kovacevic
- ‡ (Denmark) Holger Rune → replaced by (France) Quentin Halys
- ‡ (China) Shang Juncheng → replaced by (Argentina) Juan Manuel Cerúndolo
- ‡ (Italy) Lorenzo Sonego → replaced by (Australia) James Duckworth
- ‡ (United States) Eliot Spizzirri → replaced by (Kazakhstan) Alexander Shevchenko

‡ – withdrew from entry list
† – withdrew from main draw

== Qualifying ==
=== Seeds ===
1. (Czech Republic) Vít Kopřiva (qualifying competition, lucky loser)
2. (Peru) Ignacio Buse (qualifying competition)
3. (Argentina) Thiago Agustín Tirante (qualifying competition)
4. (Australia) Aleksandar Vukic (qualifying competition)
5. (Belgium) Alexander Blockx (first round)
6. (Argentina) Román Andrés Burruchaga (qualifying competition)
7. (France) Luca Van Assche (first round)
8. (United States) Patrick Kypson (first round)
9. (France) Benjamin Bonzi (qualified)
10. (Australia) Christopher O'Connell (qualified)
11. (Australia) Tristan Schoolkate (qualified)
12. (Italy) Luca Nardi (first round)
13. (Italy) Francesco Maestrelli (qualified)
14. (Chile) Tomás Barrios Vera (qualifying competition)
15. (Australia) Rinky Hijikata (qualified)
16. (Japan) Shintaro Mochizuki (qualifying competition)
17. (United States) Mackenzie McDonald (qualified)
18. (Croatia) Dino Prižmić (qualified)
19. (Czech Republic) Dalibor Svrčina (qualified)
20. (Hong Kong) Coleman Wong (first round)
21. (Belgium) David Goffin (first round)
22. (Japan) Sho Shimabukuro (qualified)
23. (Australia) Dane Sweeny (qualifying competition)
24. (Georgia (country)) Nikoloz Basilashvili (qualifying competition)

=== Qualifiers ===
1. (Czech Republic) Dalibor Svrčina
2. (Australia) Rinky Hijikata
3. (Italy) Francesco Maestrelli
4. (Croatia) Dino Prižmić
5. (Japan) Sho Shimabukuro
6. (Chinese Taipei) Tseng Chun-hsin
7. (Canada) Alexis Galarneau
8. (Spain) Daniel Mérida
9. (France) Benjamin Bonzi
10. (Australia) Christopher O'Connell
11. (Australia) Tristan Schoolkate
12. (United States) Mackenzie McDonald

=== Lucky loser ===
1. (Czech Republic) Vít Kopřiva

=== Qualifying draw ===
==== First qualifier ====
First round
1	(Czech Republic) Vít Kopřiva	6	7^{8}
(Japan) Rei Sakamoto	4	6^{6}
(United States) Mitchell Krueger	6^{6}	4
19	(Czech Republic) Dalibor Svrčina	7^{8}	6

Qualifying competition
1	(Czech Republic) Vít Kopřiva	6^{4}	4
19	(Czech Republic) Dalibor Svrčina	7^{7}	6

==== Second qualifier ====
First round
2	(Peru) Ignacio Buse	6	7^{7}
(Canada) Liam Draxl	4	6^{3}
(Switzerland) Leandro Riedi	5	3
15	(Australia) Rinky Hijikata	7	6

Qualifying competition
2	(Peru) Ignacio Buse	6	3	4
15	(Australia) Rinky Hijikata	3	6	6

==== Third qualifier ====
First round
3	(Argentina) Thiago Agustín Tirante	6	6
WC	(United States) Izyan Ahmad	1	2
(Chile) Nicolás Jarry	4	6	6^{7}
13	(Italy) Francesco Maestrelli	6	4	7^{9}

Qualifying competition
3	(Argentina) Thiago Agustín Tirante	6^{5}	4
13	(Italy) Francesco Maestrelli	7^{7}	6

==== Fourth qualifier ====
First round
4	(Australia) Aleksandar Vukic	7^{7}	7^{7}
(Italy) Stefano Travaglia	6^{2}	6^{2}
WC	(United States) Darwin Blanch	6^{3}	0
18	(Croatia) Dino Prižmić	7^{7}	6

Qualifying competition
4	(Australia) Aleksandar Vukic	2	4
18	(Croatia) Dino Prižmić	6	6

==== Fifth qualifier ====
First round
5	(Belgium) Alexander Blockx	0	2
(Spain) Martín Landaluce	6	6
(United States) Colton Smith	6^{5}	5
22	(Japan) Sho Shimabukuro	7^{7}	7

Qualifying competition
(Spain) Martín Landaluce	2	7^{7}	5
22	(Japan) Sho Shimabukuro	6	6^{3}	7

==== Sixth qualifier ====
First round
6	(Argentina) Román Andrés Burruchaga	7^{7}	4	7^{7}
(Tunisia) Moez Echargui	6^{4}	6	6^{5}
(Chinese Taipei) Tseng Chun-hsin	6	6
21	(Belgium) David Goffin	4	1

Qualifying competition
6	(Argentina) Román Andrés Burruchaga	6	6^{3}	3
(Chinese Taipei) Tseng Chun-hsin	2	7^{7}	6

==== Seventh qualifier ====
First round
7	(France) Luca Van Assche	6^{6}	4
(Canada) Alexis Galarneau	7^{8}	6
WC	(United States) Jagger Leach	3	3
14	(Chile) Tomás Barrios Vera	6	6

Qualifying competition
(Canada) Alexis Galarneau	6	6
14	(Chile) Tomás Barrios Vera	3	4

==== Eighth qualifier ====
First round
8	(United States) Patrick Kypson	6	3	6^{4}
(Spain) Daniel Mérida	3	6	7^{7}
WC	(United States) Andrew Johnson	2	1
23	(Australia) Dane Sweeny	6	6

Qualifying competition
(Spain) Daniel Mérida	6	4	6
23	(Australia) Dane Sweeny	3	6	3

==== Ninth qualifier ====
First round
9	(France) Benjamin Bonzi	6	6
(United Kingdom) Jack Pinnington Jones	3	4
(Argentina) Federico Agustín Gómez	4	6	3
16	(Japan) Shintaro Mochizuki	6	4	6

Qualifying competition
9	(France) Benjamin Bonzi	6	5	6
16	(Japan) Shintaro Mochizuki	4	7	3

==== Tenth qualifier ====
First round
10	(Australia) Christopher O'Connell	6	6
(United Kingdom) Billy Harris	4	3
(Colombia) Nicolás Mejía	6	2	4
24	(Georgia (country)) Nikoloz Basilashvili	0	6	6

Qualifying competition
10	(Australia) Christopher O'Connell	6	6
24	(Georgia (country)) Nikoloz Basilashvili	4	4

==== Eleventh qualifier ====
First round
11	(Australia) Tristan Schoolkate	3	7^{7}	6
(Australia) Alex Bolt	6	6^{4}	4
(Sweden) Elias Ymer	6	3	7^{7}
20	(Hong Kong) Coleman Wong	3	6	6^{5}

Qualifying competition
11	(Australia) Tristan Schoolkate	6	3
(Sweden) Elias Ymer	4	1^{r}

==== Twelfth qualifier ====
First round
12	(Italy) Luca Nardi	6	6^{2}	3
WC	(United States) Trevor Svajda	4	7^{7}	6
(Ukraine) Vitaliy Sachko	2	1
17	(United States) Mackenzie McDonald	6	6

Qualifying competition
WC	(United States) Trevor Svajda	4	2
17	(United States) Mackenzie McDonald	6	6
