= Fort Worth Challenger =

- 2026 Fort Worth Challenger

ATP Challenger Tour
- Event name: Scharbauer-Wikse Ace Outreach ATP Challenger
- Location: Fort Worth, Texas, United States
- Category: ATP Challenger Tour
- Surface: Hard

The Fort Worth Challenger or the Scharbauer-Wikse Ace Outreach ATP Challenger (for sponsorship reasons) is a professional tennis tournament played on hardcourts. It is currently part of the ATP Challenger Tour. It is held in Fort Worth, Texas, United States.

== Past finals ==
=== Singles ===
Year	Champion	Runner-up	Score
2026	(United States) Jenson Brooksby	(United States) Darwin Blanch	6–1, 6–4

=== Doubles ===
Year	Champions	Runners-up	Score
2026	(Spain) Albert Pedrico Kravtsov (United States) Cooper Woestendick	(United Kingdom) James Hopper (Japan) Shunsuke Mitsui	Walkover
