= 2024 Mutua Madrid Open – Men's singles =

Men's singles
- 2024 Mutua Madrid Open

Final
- Champion: Andrey Rublev
- Runner-up: (Canada) Félix Auger-Aliassime
- Score: 4–6, 7–5, 7–5

Details
- Draw: 96 (12Q, 5WC)
- Seeds: 32

Events
Singles	men	women
Doubles	men	women
- Madrid Open

Andrey Rublev defeated Félix Auger-Aliassime in the final, 4–6, 7–5, 7–5, to win the men's singles tennis title at the 2024 Madrid Open. It was his second Masters 1000 title and 16th career ATP Tour singles title overall. Auger-Aliassime became the first Canadian singles finalist at the event, and the first to reach a Masters 1000 final on clay.

Carlos Alcaraz was the two-time defending champion, but lost in the quarterfinals to Rublev.

Daniil Medvedev became the fifth player born in the 1990s (after Dominic Thiem, Stefanos Tsitsipas, Alexander Zverev, and Grigor Dimitrov) to reach at least the quarterfinals at all nine ATP Masters 1000 events, and the tenth active player overall to accomplish the feat. Taylor Fritz became the first American man to reach the semifinals of the tournament since Robby Ginepri in 2005, and the first to do so since the event switched to clay courts in 2009.

== Seeds ==
All seeds received a bye into the second round.

1. (Italy) Jannik Sinner (quarterfinals, withdrew)
2. (Spain) Carlos Alcaraz (quarterfinals)
3. Daniil Medvedev (quarterfinals, retired)
4. (Germany) Alexander Zverev (fourth round)
5. (Norway) Casper Ruud (fourth round)
6. (Greece) Stefanos Tsitsipas (second round)
7. Andrey Rublev (champion)
8. (Poland) Hubert Hurkacz (fourth round)
9. (Bulgaria) Grigor Dimitrov (second round)
10. (Australia) Alex de Minaur (second round)
11. (Denmark) Holger Rune (third round)
12. (United States) Taylor Fritz (semifinals)
13. (France) Ugo Humbert (third round)
14. (United States) Ben Shelton (third round)
15. (United States) Tommy Paul (third round)
16. Karen Khachanov (fourth round)
17. (Kazakhstan) Alexander Bublik (fourth round)
18. (Argentina) Sebastián Báez (third round)
19. (France) Adrian Mannarino (second round)
20. (United States) Frances Tiafoe (second round)
21. (Argentina) Francisco Cerúndolo (quarterfinals)
22. (Chile) Nicolás Jarry (second round)
23. (Germany) Jan-Lennard Struff (fourth round)
24. (Netherlands) Tallon Griekspoor (fourth round)
25. (United States) Sebastian Korda (third round)
26. (Argentina) Tomás Martín Etcheverry (second round)
27. (Spain) Alejandro Davidovich Fokina (third round)
28. (Italy) Lorenzo Musetti (second round)
29. (United Kingdom) Cameron Norrie (third round)
30. (Czech Republic) Jiří Lehečka (semifinals, retired)
31. (France) Arthur Fils (second round)
32. (Australia) Jordan Thompson (second round)

Click on the seed number of a player to go to their draw section.

== Draw ==
Key

- Q = Qualifier
- WC = Wild card
- LL = Lucky loser
- Alt = Alternate
- ITF = ITF entry
- PR = Protected ranking
- SR = Special ranking
- SE = Special exempt
- JE = Junior exempt
- JR = Junior Accelerator Programme entrant
- CO = College Accelerator Programme entrant
- NG = Next Gen Accelerator Program entrant
- w/o = Walkover
- r = Retired
- d = Defaulted

=== Finals ===
Quarterfinal
1	(Italy) Jannik Sinner
(Canada) Félix Auger-Aliassime	w/o
3	Daniil Medvedev	4	0^{r}
30	(Czech Republic) Jiří Lehečka	6	0
12	(United States) Taylor Fritz	6	3	6
21	(Argentina) Francisco Cerúndolo	1	6	3
7	Andrey Rublev	4	6	6
2	(Spain) Carlos Alcaraz	6	3	2

Semifinal
(Canada) Félix Auger-Aliassime	3
30	(Czech Republic) Jiří Lehečka	3^{r}
12	(United States) Taylor Fritz	4	3
7	Andrey Rublev	6	6

Final
(Canada) Félix Auger-Aliassime	6	5	5
7	Andrey Rublev	4	7	7

=== Top half ===
==== Section 1 ====
First round
Q	(France) R Gasquet	2	5
(Italy) L Sonego	6	7
Q	(Spain) A Ramos Viñolas	3	4
P Kotov	6	6
(Chile) A Tabilo	7	4	4
(Italy) F Cobolli	5	6	6
(Colombia) DE Galán	6^{4}	6	1
LL	(Spain) R Bautista Agut	7^{7}	4	6

Second round
1	(Italy) J Sinner	6	6
(Italy) L Sonego	0	3
P Kotov	5	6	7
32	(Australia) J Thompson	7	4	5
22	(Chile) N Jarry	3	6	3
(Italy) F Cobolli	6	3	6
LL	(Spain) R Bautista Agut	6	3	5
16	K Khachanov	3	6	7

Third round
1	(Italy) J Sinner	6	7
P Kotov	2	5
(Italy) F Cobolli	5	4
16	K Khachanov	7	6

Fourth round
1	(Italy) J Sinner	5	6	6
16	K Khachanov	7	3	3

==== Section 2 ====
First round
(Germany) Y Hanfmann	4	6^{3}
(Czech Republic) J Menšík	6	7^{7}
(Japan) Y Nishioka	6	1	4
(Canada) F Auger-Aliassime	4	6	6
(United States) A Michelsen	6	0	2
WC	(Brazil) J Fonseca	4	6	6
(China) Z Zhang	3	2
(Serbia) M Kecmanović	6	6

Second round
9	(Bulgaria) G Dimitrov	2	7^{7}	3
(Czech Republic) J Menšík	6	6^{4}	6
(Canada) F Auger-Aliassime	6	6
19	(France) A Mannarino	0	4
29	(United Kingdom) C Norrie	6	6
WC	(Brazil) J Fonseca	1	4
(Serbia) M Kecmanović	4	1
5	(Norway) C Ruud	6	6

Third round
(Czech Republic) J Menšík	1	0^{r}
(Canada) F Auger-Aliassime	6	1
29	(United Kingdom) C Norrie	2	4
5	(Norway) C Ruud	6	6

Fourth round
(Canada) F Auger-Aliassime	6	7
5	(Norway) C Ruud	4	5

==== Section 3 ====
First round
(Australia) C O'Connell	4	1
(Italy) M Arnaldi	6	6
(Australia) M Purcell	4	6	7^{7}
(United States) M Giron	6	4	6^{2}
(Germany) D Koepfer	1	6	6^{5}
(Spain) R Carballés Baena	6	3	7^{7}
(Czech Republic) T Macháč	6	1	6
(Finland) E Ruusuvuori	4	6	2

Second round
3	D Medvedev	2	6	6
(Italy) M Arnaldi	6	4	4
(Australia) M Purcell	3	3
25	(United States) S Korda	6	6
17	(Kazakhstan) A Bublik	1	6	6
(Spain) R Carballés Baena	6	2	2
(Czech Republic) T Macháč	0	2
14	(United States) B Shelton	6	6

Third round
3	D Medvedev	5	7^{7}	6
25	(United States) S Korda	7	6^{4}	3
17	(Kazakhstan) A Bublik	3	7^{7}	6
14	(United States) B Shelton	6	6^{2}	4

Fourth round
3	D Medvedev	7^{7}	6
17	(Kazakhstan) A Bublik	6^{3}	4

==== Section 4 ====
First round
WC	(United States) D Blanch	1	0
PR	(Spain) R Nadal	6	6
(Argentina) P Cachín	6	6
(Austria) S Ofner	3	3
Q	(United States) A Kovacevic	6	5	4
Q	(Serbia) H Medjedovic	4	7	6
(Serbia) D Lajović	4	3
Q	(Brazil) T Monteiro	6	6

Second round
10	(Australia) A de Minaur	6^{6}	3
PR	(Spain) R Nadal	7^{8}	6
(Argentina) P Cachín	7^{7}	3	6
20	(United States) F Tiafoe	6^{1}	6	4
30	(Czech Republic) J Lehečka	7	6
Q	(Serbia) H Medjedovic	5	4
Q	(Brazil) T Monteiro	6	6
6	(Greece) S Tsitsipas	4	4

Third round
PR	(Spain) R Nadal	6	6^{5}	6
(Argentina) P Cachín	1	7^{7}	3
30	(Czech Republic) J Lehečka	6	7^{9}
Q	(Brazil) T Monteiro	4	6^{7}

Fourth round
PR	(Spain) R Nadal	5	4
30	(Czech Republic) J Lehečka	7	6

=== Bottom half ===
==== Section 5 ====
First round
Q	(Australia) T Kokkinakis	3	6	5
(United Kingdom) J Draper	6	3	7
(Germany) D Altmaier	6	7
WC	(Spain) M Landaluce	1	5
(France) L Van Assche	6	6^{0}	6
WC	(Belgium) Z Bergs	4	7^{7}	1
(Italy) L Darderi	6	6
(France) G Monfils	4	2

Second round
8	(Poland) H Hurkacz	6	7
(United Kingdom) J Draper	1	5
(Germany) D Altmaier	6	6
31	(France) A Fils	2	3
18	(Argentina) S Báez	6	6^{2}	6
(France) L Van Assche	4	7^{7}	3
(Italy) L Darderi	6^{1}	4
12	(United States) T Fritz	7^{7}	6

Third round
8	(Poland) H Hurkacz	6	7^{7}
(Germany) D Altmaier	4	6^{2}
18	(Argentina) S Báez	2	3
12	(United States) T Fritz	6	6

Fourth round
8	(Poland) H Hurkacz	6^{2}	4
12	(United States) T Fritz	7^{7}	6

==== Section 6 ====
First round
Q	(Slovakia) L Klein	6	4	7^{7}
Q	(Spain) P Llamas Ruiz	1	6	6^{4}
A Karatsev	6^{6}	6^{2}
(Hungary) F Marozsán	7^{8}	7^{7}
(Argentina) F Díaz Acosta	4	6	3
PR	(Canada) D Shapovalov	6	3	6
(Croatia) B Ćorić	6^{5}	7	6
Q	(Germany) B Hassan	7^{7}	5	3

Second round
15	(United States) T Paul	6^{5}	6	6
Q	(Slovakia) L Klein	7^{7}	1	4
(Hungary) F Marozsán	2	6^{5}
21	(Argentina) F Cerúndolo	6	7^{7}
26	(Argentina) TM Etcheverry	6^{3}	3
PR	(Canada) D Shapovalov	7^{7}	6
(Croatia) B Ćorić	3	2
4	(Germany) A Zverev	6	6

Third round
15	(United States) T Paul	7^{9}	4	2
21	(Argentina) F Cerúndolo	6^{7}	6	6
PR	(Canada) D Shapovalov	4	5
4	(Germany) A Zverev	6	7

Fourth round
21	(Argentina) F Cerúndolo	6	6
4	(Germany) A Zverev	3	4

==== Section 7 ====
First round
Q	(United States) B Nakashima	3	6^{5}
Q	(Argentina) F Bagnis	6	7^{7}
Q	(France) C Moutet	7^{11}	2	6^{10}
WC	(China) J Shang	6^{9}	6	7^{12}
(Australia) A Vukic	2	7^{7}	1
(Japan) T Daniel	6	6^{1}	6
(Argentina) M Navone	7	6
(Australia) A Popyrin	5	2

Second round
7	A Rublev	6	6
Q	(Argentina) F Bagnis	1	4
WC	(China) J Shang	5	3
27	(Spain) A Davidovich Fokina	7	6
24	(Netherlands) T Griekspoor	4	6	6
(Japan) T Daniel	6	3	4
(Argentina) M Navone	7	6^{2}	4
11	(Denmark) H Rune	5	7^{7}	6

Third round
7	A Rublev	7^{12}	6
27	(Spain) A Davidovich Fokina	6^{10}	4
24	(Netherlands) T Griekspoor	6	4	6
11	(Denmark) H Rune	4	6	3

Fourth round
7	A Rublev	6	6
24	(Netherlands) T Griekspoor	2	4

==== Section 8 ====
First round
(Netherlands) B van de Zandschulp	6	6
(United States) C Eubanks	3	3
(Spain) J Munar	7	6
(Portugal) N Borges	5	4
R Safiullin	4	4
(Brazil) T Seyboth Wild	6	6
(France) A Rinderknech	4	7	3
(Kazakhstan) A Shevchenko	6	5	6

Second round
13	(France) U Humbert	6	6
(Netherlands) B van de Zandschulp	3	3
(Spain) J Munar	1	5
23	(Germany) J-L Struff	6	7
28	(Italy) L Musetti	4	4
(Brazil) T Seyboth Wild	6	6
(Kazakhstan) A Shevchenko	2	1
2	(Spain) C Alcaraz	6	6

Third round
13	(France) U Humbert	5	4
23	(Germany) J-L Struff	7	6
(Brazil) T Seyboth Wild	3	3
2	(Spain) C Alcaraz	6	6

Fourth round
23	(Germany) J-L Struff	3	7^{7}	6^{4}
2	(Spain) C Alcaraz	6	6^{5}	7^{7}

== Seeded players ==
The following are the seeded players. Seedings are based on ATP rankings as of 22 April 2024. Rankings and points before are as of 22 April 2024.

Seed	Rank	Player	Points before	Points defending	Points earned	Points after	Status
1	2	(Italy) Jannik Sinner	8,660	0	200	8,860	Quarterfinals withdrew due to a hip injury.
2	3	(Spain) Carlos Alcaraz	8,145	1,000	200	7,345	Quarterfinal lost to Andrey Rublev [7]
3	4	Daniil Medvedev	7,085	90	200	7,195	Quarterfinal retired against (Czech Republic) Jiří Lehečka [30]
4	5	(Germany) Alexander Zverev	5,425	90	100	5,435	Fourth round lost to (Argentina) Francisco Cerúndolo [21]
5	6	(Norway) Casper Ruud	4,480	(45)^{†}	100	4,535	Fourth round lost to (Canada) Félix Auger-Aliassime
6	7	(Greece) Stefanos Tsitsipas	4,030	180	10	3,860	Second round lost to (Brazil) Thiago Monteiro [Q]
7	8	Andrey Rublev	3,830	90	1,000	4,740	Champion, defeated (Canada) Félix Auger-Aliassime
8	9	(Poland) Hubert Hurkacz	3,675	45	100	3,730	Fourth round lost to (United States) Taylor Fritz [12]
9	10	(Bulgaria) Grigor Dimitrov	3,640	45	10	3,605	Second round lost to (Czech Republic) Jakub Menšík
10	11	(Australia) Alex de Minaur	3,470	45	10	3,435	Second round lost to (Spain) Rafael Nadal [PR]
11	12	(Denmark) Holger Rune	3,245	45	50	3,250	Third round lost to (Netherlands) Tallon Griekspoor [24]
12	13	(United States) Taylor Fritz	2,560	90	400	2,870	Semifinals lost to Andrey Rublev [7]
13	14	(France) Ugo Humbert	2,535	(175)^{‡}	50	2,410	Third round lost to (Germany) Jan-Lennard Struff [23]
14	15	(United States) Ben Shelton	2,480	10+60	50+0	2,460	Third round lost to (Kazakhstan) Alexander Bublik [17]
15	16	(United States) Tommy Paul	2,350	(100)^{‡}	50	2,300	Third round lost to (Argentina) Francisco Cerúndolo [21]
16	17	Karen Khachanov	2,080	180	100	2,000	Fourth round lost to (Italy) Jannik Sinner [1]
17	18	(Kazakhstan) Alexander Bublik	1,992	25+32	100+20	2,055	Fourth round lost to Daniil Medvedev [3]
18	19	(Argentina) Sebastián Báez	1,955	45	50	1,960	Third round lost to (United States) Taylor Fritz [12]
19	20	(France) Adrian Mannarino	1,875	10	10	1,875	Second round lost to (Canada) Félix Auger-Aliassime
20	21	(United States) Frances Tiafoe	1,685	45	10	1,650	Second round lost to (Argentina) Pedro Cachín
21	22	(Argentina) Francisco Cerúndolo	1,680	10	200	1,870	Quarterfinals lost to (United States) Taylor Fritz [12]
22	23	(Chile) Nicolás Jarry	1,675	10	10	1,675	Second round lost to (Italy) Flavio Cobolli
23	24	(Germany) Jan-Lennard Struff	1,628	608	100	1,120	Fourth round lost to (Spain) Carlos Alcaraz [2]
24	25	(Netherlands) Tallon Griekspoor	1,505	10	100	1,595	Fourth round lost to Andrey Rublev [7]
25	26	(United States) Sebastian Korda	1,485	10	50	1,525	Third round lost to Daniil Medvedev [3]
26	27	(Argentina) Tomás Martín Etcheverry	1,475	25	10	1,460	Second round lost to (Canada) Denis Shapovalov [PR]
27	28	(Spain) Alejandro Davidovich Fokina	1,355	90	50	1,315	Third round lost to Andrey Rublev [7]
28	29	(Italy) Lorenzo Musetti	1,355	(25)^{†}	10	1,340	Second round lost to (Brazil) Thiago Seyboth Wild
29	30	(United Kingdom) Cameron Norrie	1,345	45	50	1,350	Third round lost to (Norway) Casper Ruud [5]
30	31	(Czech Republic) Jiří Lehečka	1,305	10	400	1,695	Semifinal retired against (Canada) Félix Auger-Aliassime
31	32	(France) Arthur Fils	1,273	(32)^{^}	10	1,251	Second round lost to (Germany) Daniel Altmaier
32	33	(Australia) Jordan Thompson	1,256	(75)^{^}	10	1,191	Second round lost to Pavel Kotov

† The player's 2023 points were replaced by a better result for purposes of his ranking as of 22 April 2024. Points for his 19th best result will be deducted instead.
‡ The player's 2023 points were replaced by a better result for purposes of his ranking as of 22 April 2024. He is defending points from an ATP Challenger Tour event held during the second week of the 2023 tournament instead.
^ The player did not qualify for the main draw in 2023. He is defending points from an ATP Challenger Tour event instead.

=== Withdrawn players ===
The following players would have been seeded, but withdrew before the tournament began.

Rank	Player	Points before	Points dropped	Points after	Withdrawal reason
1	(Serbia) Novak Djokovic	9,990	0	9,990	Schedule change

== Other entry information ==
=== Wildcards ===
- (Belgium) Zizou Bergs
- (United States) Darwin Blanch
- (Brazil) João Fonseca
- (Spain) Martín Landaluce
- (China) Shang Juncheng

=== Protected ranking ===
- (Spain) Rafael Nadal
- (Canada) Denis Shapovalov

=== Lucky losers ===
- (Spain) Roberto Bautista Agut

=== Withdrawals ===
- ‡ (Italy) Matteo Berrettini → replaced by (Colombia) Daniel Elahi Galán
- ‡ (France) Arthur Cazaux → replaced by (Japan) Taro Daniel
- ‡ (Croatia) Marin Čilić → replaced by (Brazil) Thiago Seyboth Wild
- ‡ (Serbia) Laslo Djere → replaced by (France) Arthur Rinderknech
- ‡ (Serbia) Novak Djokovic → replaced by (France) Luca Van Assche
- § (United Kingdom) Dan Evans → replaced by (Spain) Roberto Bautista Agut
- ‡ (United States) Mackenzie McDonald → replaced by (Netherlands) Botic van de Zandschulp
- ‡ (United Kingdom) Andy Murray → replaced by (Argentina) Pedro Cachín

‡ – withdrew from entry list
§ – withdrew from main draw

== Qualifying ==
=== Seeds ===
1. (Spain) Pedro Martínez (first round)
2. (Argentina) Federico Coria (qualifying competition)
3. (Spain) Roberto Bautista Agut (qualifying competition, lucky loser)
4. (United States) Brandon Nakashima (qualified)
5. (Argentina) Thiago Agustín Tirante (qualifying competition)
6. (France) Constant Lestienne (withdrew)
7. (France) Corentin Moutet (qualified)
8. (Australia) Thanasi Kokkinakis (qualified)
9. (Italy) Fabio Fognini (withdrew)
10. (France) Hugo Gaston (first round)
11. (United States) Aleksandar Kovacevic (qualified)
12. (Belgium) David Goffin (first round)
13. (Germany) Maximilian Marterer (first round)
14. (Austria) Dominic Thiem (qualifying competition)
15. (Chile) Cristian Garín (withdrew)
16. (Spain) Albert Ramos Viñolas (qualified)
17. (Argentina) Camilo Ugo Carabelli (qualifying competition)
18. (France) Alexandre Müller (first round, retired)
19. (France) Richard Gasquet (qualified)
20. (Brazil) Thiago Monteiro (qualified)
21. (Argentina) Francisco Comesaña (qualifying competition)
22. (Slovakia) Lukáš Klein (qualified)
23. (Austria) Jurij Rodionov (first round)
24. (Czech Republic) Vít Kopřiva (first round)
25. (Croatia) Duje Ajduković (qualifying competition)

=== Qualifiers ===
1. (Brazil) Thiago Monteiro
2. (Spain) Pablo Llamas Ruiz
3. (Spain) Albert Ramos Viñolas
4. (United States) Brandon Nakashima
5. (Slovakia) Lukáš Klein
6. (Germany) Benjamin Hassan
7. (France) Corentin Moutet
8. (Australia) Thanasi Kokkinakis
9. (France) Richard Gasquet
10. (Serbia) Hamad Medjedovic
11. (United States) Aleksandar Kovacevic
12. (Argentina) Facundo Bagnis

=== Lucky loser ===
1. (Spain) Roberto Bautista Agut

=== Qualifying draw ===
==== First qualifier ====
First round
1	(Spain) Pedro Martínez	2	3
(Moldova) Radu Albot	6	6
WC	(France) Lucas Pouille	6	4	4
20	(Brazil) Thiago Monteiro	4	6	6

Qualifying competition
(Moldova) Radu Albot	6^{6}	6	4
20	(Brazil) Thiago Monteiro	7^{8}	1	6

==== Second qualifier ====
First round
2	(Argentina) Federico Coria	6	4	6
(Kazakhstan) Mikhail Kukushkin	2	6	2
(France) Quentin Halys	2	4
Alt	(Spain) Pablo Llamas Ruiz	6	6

Qualifying competition
2	(Argentina) Federico Coria	5	5
Alt	(Spain) Pablo Llamas Ruiz	7	7

==== Third qualifier ====
First round
3	(Spain) Roberto Bautista Agut	6	6
WC	(Kazakhstan) Amir Omarkhanov	2	1
(Argentina) Diego Schwartzman	6	6^{3}	2
16	(Spain) Albert Ramos Viñolas	3	7^{7}	6

Qualifying competition
3	(Spain) Roberto Bautista Agut	4	6	4
16	(Spain) Albert Ramos Viñolas	6	3	6

==== Fourth qualifier ====
First round
4	(United States) Brandon Nakashima	6	6^{5}	6
WC	(Morocco) Reda Bennani	1	7^{7}	1
(Spain) Bernabé Zapata Miralles	4	4
17	(Argentina) Camilo Ugo Carabelli	6	6

Qualifying competition
4	(United States) Brandon Nakashima	7^{7}	7^{8}
17	(Argentina) Camilo Ugo Carabelli	6^{4}	6^{6}

==== Fifth qualifier ====
First round
5	(Argentina) Thiago Agustín Tirante	6	7
(France) Titouan Droguet	3	5
WC	(Spain) Pol Martín Tiffon	3	2
22	(Slovakia) Lukáš Klein	6	6

Qualifying competition
5	(Argentina) Thiago Agustín Tirante	3	3
22	(Slovakia) Lukáš Klein	6	6

==== Sixth qualifier ====
First round
Alt	(Germany) Benjamin Hassan	6	6
(United States) Emilio Nava	4	2
(Japan) Shintaro Mochizuki	7^{9}	2
18	(France) Alexandre Müller	6^{7}	0^{r}

Qualifying competition
Alt	(Germany) Benjamin Hassan	5	7	6
(Japan) Shintaro Mochizuki	7	5	3

==== Seventh qualifier ====
First round
7	(France) Corentin Moutet	6	7^{7}
(France) Térence Atmane	4	6^{3}
WC	(Jordan) Abdullah Shelbayh	6	1	6
24	(Czech Republic) Vít Kopřiva	1	6	1

Qualifying competition
7	(France) Corentin Moutet	6	6
WC	(Jordan) Abdullah Shelbayh	2	2

==== Eighth qualifier ====
First round
8	(Australia) Thanasi Kokkinakis	6	6
(France) Grégoire Barrère	2	2
(Brazil) Felipe Meligeni Alves	2	6	5
14	(Austria) Dominic Thiem	6	3	7

Qualifying competition
8	(Australia) Thanasi Kokkinakis	6	6
14	(Austria) Dominic Thiem	1	3

==== Ninth qualifier ====
First round
25	(Croatia) Duje Ajduković	7	7
(France) Pierre-Hugues Herbert	5	5
Alt	(Italy) Stefano Napolitano	4	3
19	(France) Richard Gasquet	6	6

Qualifying competition
25	(Croatia) Duje Ajduković	2	5
19	(France) Richard Gasquet	6	7

==== Tenth qualifier ====
First round
10	(France) Hugo Gaston	6	3	1
(Serbia) Hamad Medjedovic	4	6	6
(Italy) Andrea Vavassori	4	5
21	(Argentina) Francisco Comesaña	6	7

Qualifying competition
(Serbia) Hamad Medjedovic	6	6
21	(Argentina) Francisco Comesaña	4	1

==== Eleventh qualifier ====
First round
11	(United States) Aleksandar Kovacevic	6	6
(Italy) Matteo Gigante	3	3
(Monaco) Valentin Vacherot	6	2	6
23	(Austria) Jurij Rodionov	3	6	2

Qualifying competition
11	(United States) Aleksandar Kovacevic	6	6
(Monaco) Valentin Vacherot	4	2

==== Twelfth qualifier ====
First round
12	(Belgium) David Goffin	2	6	3
(Argentina) Facundo Bagnis	6	2	6
(Italy) Giulio Zeppieri	6	7^{7}
13	(Germany) Maximilian Marterer	3	6^{5}

Qualifying competition
(Argentina) Facundo Bagnis	6	6
(Italy) Giulio Zeppieri	4	4
