= 2024 Miami Open – Men's singles =

Men's singles
- 2024 Miami Open

Final
- Champion: (Italy) Jannik Sinner
- Runner-up: (Bulgaria) Grigor Dimitrov
- Score: 6–3, 6–1

Details
- Draw: 96 (12 Q / 5 WC )
- Seeds: 32

Events
Singles	men	women
Doubles	men	women
- Miami Open

Jannik Sinner defeated Grigor Dimitrov in the final, 6–3, 6–1 to win the men's singles tennis title at the 2024 Miami Open. It was his second Masters 1000 title and 13th career ATP Tour title. With the win, Sinner rose to world No. 2 in the ATP rankings for the first time, becoming the first Italian player of either gender to do so. Aged 22, Sinner was the youngest player to reach three Miami Open finals (following 2021 and 2023).

Daniil Medvedev was the defending champion, but lost in the semifinals to Sinner in a rematch of the previous year's final, as well as a rematch of this year's Australian Open final.

Dimitrov was the oldest man to reach the Miami Open final since Roger Federer in 2019. He was the fourth man born in the 1990s to reach the quarterfinals of all nine Masters events (after Dominic Thiem, Alexander Zverev and Stefanos Tsitsipas). With his run to the final, Dimitrov returned to the top 10 of the ATP rankings for the first time since October 2018.

Coleman Wong became the first player from Hong Kong to qualify for the main draw of an ATP Masters 1000 tournament.

For only the second time in tournament history (after 2016) there were no Americans in the fourth round. It was also the first time at the tournament since 2009 that the top four men's singles seeds all reached the quarterfinals.

This marked the final appearance of former world No. 1, two-time Olympic gold medalist and 14-time Masters 1000 champion Andy Murray at a Masters tournament; he lost in the third round to Tomáš Macháč.

== Seeds ==
All the seeds received a bye into the second round.

1. (Spain) Carlos Alcaraz (quarterfinals)
2. (Italy) Jannik Sinner (champion)
3. Daniil Medvedev (semifinals)
4. (Germany) Alexander Zverev (semifinals)
5. Andrey Rublev (second round)
6. (Denmark) Holger Rune (second round)
7. (Norway) Casper Ruud (fourth round)
8. (Poland) Hubert Hurkacz (fourth round)
9. (Australia) Alex de Minaur (fourth round)
10. (Greece) Stefanos Tsitsipas (second round)
11. (Bulgaria) Grigor Dimitrov (final)
12. (United States) Taylor Fritz (second round)
13. (United States) Tommy Paul (second round, retired)
14. (France) Ugo Humbert (third round)
15. Karen Khachanov (fourth round)
16. (United States) Ben Shelton (third round)
17. (Kazakhstan) Alexander Bublik (second round)
18. (Argentina) Sebastián Báez (second round)
19. (France) Adrian Mannarino (second round)
20. (Argentina) Francisco Cerúndolo (third round)
21. (United States) Frances Tiafoe (second round)
22. (Chile) Nicolás Jarry (quarterfinals)
23. (Italy) Lorenzo Musetti (fourth round)
24. (Germany) Jan-Lennard Struff (third round)
25. (Netherlands) Tallon Griekspoor (third round)
26. (Czech Republic) Jiří Lehečka (second round)
27. (Spain) Alejandro Davidovich Fokina (third round)
28. (United States) Sebastian Korda (third round)
29. (Argentina) Tomás Martín Etcheverry (second round)
30. (United Kingdom) Cameron Norrie (third round)
31. (United States) Christopher Eubanks (third round)
32. (Croatia) Borna Ćorić (withdrew)
33. (Australia) Jordan Thompson (second round)

Click on the seed number of a player to go to their draw section.

== Draw ==
Key

- Q = Qualifier
- WC = Wild card
- LL = Lucky loser
- Alt = Alternate
- ITF = ITF entry
- PR = Protected ranking
- SR = Special ranking
- SE = Special exempt
- JE = Junior exempt
- JR = Junior Accelerator Programme entrant
- CO = College Accelerator Programme entrant
- NG = Next Gen Accelerator Program entrant
- w/o = Walkover
- r = Retired
- d = Defaulted

=== Finals ===
Quarterfinals
1	(Spain) Carlos Alcaraz	2	4
11	(Bulgaria) Grigor Dimitrov	6	6
4	(Germany) Alexander Zverev	6	7
(Hungary) Fábián Marozsán	3	5
22	(Chile) Nicolás Jarry	2	6^{7}
3	Daniil Medvedev	6	7^{9}
(Czech Republic) Tomáš Macháč	4	2
2	(Italy) Jannik Sinner	6	6

Semifinals
11	(Bulgaria) Grigor Dimitrov	6	6^{4}	6
4	(Germany) Alexander Zverev	4	7^{7}	4
3	Daniil Medvedev	1	2
2	(Italy) Jannik Sinner	6	6

Final
11	(Bulgaria) Grigor Dimitrov	3	1
2	(Italy) Jannik Sinner	6	6

=== Top half ===
==== Section 1 ====
First round
(Australia) A Vukic	6^{2}	3
(Spain) R Carballés Baena	7^{7}	6
(Serbia) D Lajović	6^{5}	4
(France) G Monfils	7^{7}	6
R Safiullin	6	6
Q	(Argentina) D Schwartzman	2	4
WC	(Spain) M Landaluce	6	1	7
(Spain) J Munar	3	6	5

Second round
1	(Spain) C Alcaraz	6	6
(Spain) R Carballés Baena	2	1
(France) G Monfils	6^{3}	6	6
33	(Australia) J Thompson	7^{7}	1	2
23	(Italy) L Musetti	7	6
R Safiullin	5	1
WC	(Spain) M Landaluce	3	4
16	(United States) B Shelton	6	6

Third round
1	(Spain) C Alcaraz	6	6
(France) G Monfils	2	4
23	(Italy) L Musetti	6	7^{7}
16	(United States) B Shelton	4	6^{5}

Fourth round
1	(Spain) C Alcaraz	6	6
23	(Italy) L Musetti	3	3

==== Section 2 ====
First round
(Chile) A Tabilo	6	3	6
Q	(United States) B Nakashima	4	6	3
(Finland) E Ruusuvuori	4	6	4
(Germany) Y Hanfmann	6	4	6
Q	(United States) E Nava	3	6^{4}
Q	(Spain) R Bautista Agut	6	7^{7}
(Colombia) DE Galán	7^{7}	6^{4}	5
(Kazakhstan) A Shevchenko	6^{4}	7^{7}	7

Second round
11	(Bulgaria) G Dimitrov	6^{5}	7^{7}	6
(Chile) A Tabilo	7^{7}	6^{5}	2
(Germany) Y Hanfmann	3	7^{7}	6
19	(France) A Mannarino	6	6^{1}	4
28	(United States) S Korda	6^{2}	6	6
Q	(Spain) R Bautista Agut	7^{7}	3	4
(Kazakhstan) A Shevchenko	4	7^{7}	3
8	(Poland) H Hurkacz	6	6^{2}	6

Third round
11	(Bulgaria) G Dimitrov	6	6
(Germany) Y Hanfmann	1	0
28	(United States) S Korda	6^{5}	7^{7}	3
8	(Poland) H Hurkacz	7^{7}	6^{5}	6

Fourth round
11	(Bulgaria) G Dimitrov	3	6	7^{7}
8	(Poland) H Hurkacz	6	3	6^{3}

==== Section 3 ====
First round
(Canada) F Auger-Aliassime	7	6
Q	(Australia) A Walton	5	4
(Italy) L Sonego	6	3	4
(United Kingdom) D Evans	1	6	6
(Austria) S Ofner	6	6
WC	(Japan) K Nishikori	3	4
(Serbia) L Djere	7	7^{7}
Q	(Hong Kong) C Wong	5	6^{3}

Second round
4	(Germany) A Zverev	6	6
(Canada) F Auger-Aliassime	2	4
(United Kingdom) D Evans	6^{3}	6	6^{7}
31	(United States) C Eubanks	7^{7}	3	7^{9}
20	(Argentina) F Cerúndolo	7^{7}	6^{2}	6
(Austria) S Ofner	6^{2}	7^{7}	1
(Serbia) L Djere	2	4
15	K Khachanov	6	6

Third round
4	(Germany) A Zverev	7^{7}	6
31	(United States) C Eubanks	6^{4}	3
20	(Argentina) F Cerúndolo	1	7	6^{5}
15	K Khachanov	6	5	7^{7}

Fourth round
4	(Germany) A Zverev	6	6
15	K Khachanov	1	4

==== Section 4 ====
First round
(France) A Müller	6^{3}	3
PR	(South Korea) S-w Kwon	7^{7}	6
(Germany) D Altmaier	6	7
Q	(France) H Mayot	2	5
(Australia) A Popyrin	6	6
(Argentina) F Díaz Acosta	2	2
Q	(United States) A Kovacevic	3	2
(Hungary) F Marozsán	6	6

Second round
9	(Australia) A de Minaur	6	6
PR	(South Korea) S-w Kwon	3	2
(Germany) D Altmaier	3	3
24	(Germany) J-L Struff	6	6
26	(Czech Republic) J Lehečka	4	4
(Australia) A Popyrin	6	6
(Hungary) F Marozsán	6	6
6	(Denmark) H Rune	1	1

Third round
9	(Australia) A de Minaur	7^{7}	6
24	(Germany) J-L Struff	6^{3}	4
(Australia) A Popyrin	5	3
(Hungary) F Marozsán	7	6

Fourth round
9	(Australia) A de Minaur	4	6	1
(Hungary) F Marozsán	6	0	6

=== Bottom half ===
==== Section 5 ====
First round
P Kotov	3	5
(France) L Van Assche	6	7
(Serbia) M Kecmanović	6^{5}	6	6^{5}
WC	(China) J Shang	7^{7}	4	7^{7}
(United Kingdom) J Draper	6	6
(Japan) T Daniel	3	2
Q	(Brazil) T Seyboth Wild	6	7
(Portugal) N Borges	4	5

Second round
7	(Norway) C Ruud	7^{7}	1	6
(France) L Van Assche	6^{5}	6	1
WC	(China) J Shang	3	5
27	(Spain) A Davidovich Fokina	6	7
22	(Chile) N Jarry	7^{7}	4	7^{7}
(United Kingdom) J Draper	6^{5}	6	6^{2}
Q	(Brazil) T Seyboth Wild	6	6
12	(United States) T Fritz	3	4

Third round
7	(Norway) C Ruud	6	6
27	(Spain) A Davidovich Fokina	3	4
22	(Chile) N Jarry	6^{1}	7	6
Q	(Brazil) T Seyboth Wild	7^{7}	5	3

Fourth round
7	(Norway) C Ruud	6^{3}	3
22	(Chile) N Jarry	7^{7}	6

==== Section 6 ====
First round
(Australia) R Hijikata	5	6^{3}
(Netherlands) B van de Zandschulp	7	7^{7}
(United States) M Giron	6	1	4
(Germany) D Koepfer	4	6	6
LL	(Japan) Y Nishioka	6	1	4
(Italy) F Cobolli	1	6	6
(Australia) M Purcell	2	1
(Hungary) M Fucsovics	6	6

Second round
14	(France) U Humbert	6	6
(Netherlands) B van de Zandschulp	4	3
(Germany) D Koepfer	6	6
18	(Argentina) S Báez	3	2
30	(United Kingdom) C Norrie	7	6^{4}	6
(Italy) F Cobolli	5	7^{7}	2
(Hungary) M Fucsovics	4	2
3	D Medvedev	6	6

Third round
14	(France) U Humbert	6	4	3
(Germany) D Koepfer	3	6	6
30	(United Kingdom) C Norrie	5	1
3	D Medvedev	7	6

Fourth round
(Germany) D Koepfer	6^{5}	0
3	D Medvedev	7^{7}	6

==== Section 7 ====
First round
(Czech Republic) T Macháč	6	6
WC	(United States) Dar Blanch	4	2
(United Kingdom) A Murray	4	6	6
PR	(Italy) M Berrettini	6	3	4
(France) A Fils	3	4
(Italy) M Arnaldi	6	6
(Italy) L Darderi	3	7^{7}	4
PR	(Canada) D Shapovalov	6	6^{3}	6

Second round
5	A Rublev	4	4
(Czech Republic) T Macháč	6	6
(United Kingdom) A Murray	7^{7}	6
29	(Argentina) TM Etcheverry	6^{0}	3
17	(Kazakhstan) A Bublik	4	1
(Italy) M Arnaldi	6	6
PR	(Canada) D Shapovalov	6	6
10	(Greece) S Tsitsipas	2	4

Third round
(Czech Republic) T Macháč	5	7	7^{7}
(United Kingdom) A Murray	7	5	6^{5}
(Italy) M Arnaldi	6	7^{9}
PR	(Canada) D Shapovalov	3	6^{7}

Fourth round
(Czech Republic) T Macháč	6	6
(Italy) M Arnaldi	3	3

==== Section 8 ====
First round
WC	(United States) M Damm	7^{7}	7^{7}
(China) Z Zhang	6^{2}	6^{3}
(Australia) C O'Connell	6	6
Q	(Czech Republic) V Kopřiva	2	4
(United States) A Michelsen	7^{7}	6
Q	(Slovakia) L Klein	6^{5}	2
(Argentina) P Cachín	2	2
Q	(Italy) A Vavassori	6	6

Second round
13	(United States) T Paul	6	1^{r}
WC	(United States) M Damm	4	2
(Australia) C O'Connell	7	7^{7}
21	(United States) F Tiafoe	5	6^{5}
25	(Netherlands) T Griekspoor	7^{7}	6^{7}	6
(United States) A Michelsen	6^{5}	7^{9}	4
Q	(Italy) A Vavassori	3	4
2	(Italy) J Sinner	6	6

Third round
WC	(United States) M Damm	6^{5}	6^{5}
(Australia) C O'Connell	7^{7}	7^{7}
25	(Netherlands) T Griekspoor	7	5	1
2	(Italy) J Sinner	5	7	6

Fourth round
(Australia) C O'Connell	4	3
2	(Italy) J Sinner	6	6

== Seeded players ==
The following are the seeded players. Seedings are based on ATP rankings as of March 18, 2024. Rankings and points before are as of March 18, 2024.

Seed	Rank	Player	Points before	Points defending	Points earned	Points after	Status
1	2	(Spain) Carlos Alcaraz	8,805	360	200	8,645	Quarterfinals lost to (Bulgaria) Grigor Dimitrov [11]
2	3	(Italy) Jannik Sinner	8,310	600	1,000	8,710	Champion, defeated (Bulgaria) Grigor Dimitrov [11]
3	4	Daniil Medvedev	7,765	1,000	400	7,165	Semifinals lost to (Italy) Jannik Sinner [2]
4	5	(Germany) Alexander Zverev	5,060	(45)^{†}	400	5,415	Semifinals lost to (Bulgaria) Grigor Dimitrov [11]
5	6	Andrey Rublev	4,970	90	10	4,890	Second round lost to (Czech Republic) Tomáš Macháč
6	7	(Denmark) Holger Rune	3,875	90	10	3,795	Second round lost to (Hungary) Fábián Marozsán
7	8	(Norway) Casper Ruud	3,560	45	100	3,615	Fourth round lost to (Chile) Nicolás Jarry [22]
8	9	(Poland) Hubert Hurkacz	3,370	45	100	3,425	Fourth round lost to (Bulgaria) Grigor Dimitrov [11]
9	10	(Australia) Alex de Minaur	3,300	(45)^{†}	100	3,355	Fourth round lost to (Hungary) Fábián Marozsán
10	11	(Greece) Stefanos Tsitsipas	3,255	90	10	3,175	Second round lost to (Canada) Denis Shapovalov [PR]
11	12	(Bulgaria) Grigor Dimitrov	2,935	45	650	3,540	Runner-up, lost to (Italy) Jannik Sinner [2]
12	13	(United States) Taylor Fritz	2,935	180	10	2,765	Second round lost to (Brazil) Thiago Seyboth Wild [Q]
13	14	(United States) Tommy Paul	2,430	90	10	2,350	Second round retired against (United States) Martin Damm [WC]
14	15	(France) Ugo Humbert	2,420	(45)^{†}	50	2,425	Third round lost to (Germany) Dominik Koepfer
15	16	Karen Khachanov	2,265	360	100	2,005	Fourth round lost to (Germany) Alexander Zverev [4]
16	17	(United States) Ben Shelton	2,220	10	50	2,260	Third round lost to (Italy) Lorenzo Musetti [23]
17	18	(Kazakhstan) Alexander Bublik	2,002	(20)^{†}	10	1,992	Second round lost to (Italy) Matteo Arnaldi
18	19	(Argentina) Sebastián Báez	1,990	(20)^{†}	10	1,980	Second round lost to (Germany) Dominik Koepfer
19	20	(France) Adrian Mannarino	1,955	90	10	1,875	Second round lost to (Germany) Yannick Hanfmann
20	21	(Argentina) Francisco Cerúndolo	1,845	180	50	1,715	Third round lost to Karen Khachanov [15]
21	22	(United States) Frances Tiafoe	1,805	45	10	1,770	Second round lost to (Australia) Christopher O'Connell
22	23	(Chile) Nicolás Jarry	1,575	(20)^{‡}	200	1,755	Quarterfinals lost to Daniil Medvedev [3]
23	24	(Italy) Lorenzo Musetti	1,520	10	100	1,610	Fourth round lost to (Spain) Carlos Alcaraz [1]
24	25	(Germany) Jan-Lennard Struff	1,484	41	50	1,493	Third round lost to (Australia) Alex de Minaur [9]
25	26	(Netherlands) Tallon Griekspoor	1,450	0	50	1,500	Third round lost to (Italy) Jannik Sinner [2]
26	27	(Czech Republic) Jiří Lehečka	1,435	45	10	1,400	Second round lost to (Australia) Alexei Popyrin
27	28	(Spain) Alejandro Davidovich Fokina	1,425	45	50	1,430	Third round lost to (Norway) Casper Ruud [7]
28	29	(United States) Sebastian Korda	1,395	0	50	1,445	Third round lost to (Poland) Hubert Hurkacz [8]
29	30	(Argentina) Tomás Martín Etcheverry	1,325	25	10	1,310	Second round lost to (United Kingdom) Andy Murray
30	31	(United Kingdom) Cameron Norrie	1,250	10	50	1,290	Third round lost to Daniil Medvedev [3]
31	32	(United States) Christopher Eubanks	1,233	196	50	1,087	Third round lost to (Germany) Alexander Zverev [4]
~~32~~	~~33~~	~~(Croatia) Borna Ćorić~~	1,214	10	0	1,204	Withdrew
33	34	(Australia) Jordan Thompson	1,211	26	10	1,195	Second round lost to (France) Gaël Monfils

† The player's 2023 points were replaced by a better result for purposes of his ranking as of March 18, 2024. Points for his 19th best result will be deducted instead.
‡ The player did not qualify for the main draw in 2023. Points for his 19th best result will be deducted instead.

=== Withdrawn players ===
The following players would have been seeded, but withdrew before the tournament began.

Rank	Player	Points before	Points dropped	Points after	Withdrawal reason
1	(Serbia) Novak Djokovic	9,725	0	9,725	Personal reason

== Other entry information ==
=== Wildcards ===
- (United States) Darwin Blanch
- (United States) Martin Damm
- (Spain) Martín Landaluce
- (Japan) Kei Nishikori
- (China) Shang Juncheng

=== Protected ranking ===
- (Italy) Matteo Berrettini
- (South Korea) Kwon Soon-woo
- (Canada) Denis Shapovalov

=== Withdrawals ===
- § (Croatia) Borna Ćorić → replaced by (Japan) Yoshihito Nishioka (LL)
- ‡ (Serbia) Novak Djokovic → replaced by (South Korea) Kwon Soon-woo
- ‡ Aslan Karatsev → replaced by (Italy) Luciano Darderi
- ‡ (United States) Mackenzie McDonald → replaced by (Hungary) Márton Fucsovics
- ‡ (Canada) Milos Raonic → replaced by (Australia) Rinky Hijikata
- ‡ (Switzerland) Stan Wawrinka → replaced by (Colombia) Daniel Elahi Galán

‡ – withdrew from entry list
§ – withdrew from main draw

== Qualifying ==
=== Seeds ===
1. (Brazil) Thiago Seyboth Wild (qualified)
2. (Japan) Yoshihito Nishioka (qualifying competition, lucky loser)
3. (France) Arthur Cazaux (first round, retired)
4. (Czech Republic) Jakub Menšík (qualifying competition)
5. (France) Arthur Rinderknech (qualifying competition)
6. (France) Hugo Gaston (first round)
7. (Chile) Cristian Garín (first round)
8. (Spain) Pedro Martínez (qualifying competition)
9. (United States) Aleksandar Kovacevic (qualified)
10. (United States) Brandon Nakashima (qualified)
11. (United States) J. J. Wolf (qualifying competition)
12. (Austria) Jurij Rodionov (first round)
13. (Spain) Roberto Bautista Agut (qualified)
14. (Australia) Thanasi Kokkinakis (first round, retired)
15. (France) Constant Lestienne (withdrew)
16. (India) Sumit Nagal (qualifying competition)
17. (France) Quentin Halys (first round)
18. (France) Benoît Paire (first round)
19. (Belgium) David Goffin (qualifying competition)
20. (Brazil) Thiago Monteiro (first round)
21. (Czech Republic) Vít Kopřiva (qualified)
22. (Argentina) Diego Schwartzman (qualified)
23. (Croatia) Duje Ajduković (first round)
24. (Belgium) Zizou Bergs (qualifying competition)

=== Qualifiers ===
1. (Brazil) Thiago Seyboth Wild
2. (United States) Emilio Nava
3. (France) Harold Mayot
4. (Slovakia) Lukáš Klein
5. (Argentina) Diego Schwartzman
6. (Hong Kong) Coleman Wong
7. (Italy) Andrea Vavassori
8. (Australia) Adam Walton
9. (United States) Aleksandar Kovacevic
10. (United States) Brandon Nakashima
11. (Czech Republic) Vít Kopřiva
12. (Spain) Roberto Bautista Agut

=== Lucky loser ===
1. (Japan) Yoshihito Nishioka

=== Draw ===
==== First qualifier ====
First round
1	(Brazil) Thiago Seyboth Wild	6	6
(Bosnia and Herzegovina) Damir Džumhur	4	2
(France) Hugo Grenier	6	4
14	(Australia) Thanasi Kokkinakis	4	1^{r}

Qualifying competition
1	(Brazil) Thiago Seyboth Wild	6	6
(France) Hugo Grenier	3	4

==== Second qualifier ====
First round
2	(Japan) Yoshihito Nishioka	6	7^{7}
(Sweden) Elias Ymer	3	6^{4}
(United States) Emilio Nava	6	7
17	(France) Quentin Halys	4	5

Qualifying competition
2	(Japan) Yoshihito Nishioka	5	6^{6}
(United States) Emilio Nava	7	7^{8}

==== Third qualifier ====
First round
3	(France) Arthur Cazaux	4	7	2^{r}
(France) Harold Mayot	6	5	1
(Japan) Shintaro Mochizuki	6^{4}	2
19	(Belgium) David Goffin	7^{7}	6

Qualifying competition
(France) Harold Mayot	7^{7}	6
19	(Belgium) David Goffin	6^{5}	2

==== Fourth qualifier ====
First round
4	(Czech Republic) Jakub Menšík	6	6
(Italy) Luca Nardi	4	2
(Slovakia) Lukáš Klein	6	7^{7}
18	(France) Benoît Paire	1	6^{2}

Qualifying competition
4	(Czech Republic) Jakub Menšík	6^{6}	5
(Slovakia) Lukáš Klein	7^{8}	7

==== Fifth qualifier ====
First round
5	(France) Arthur Rinderknech	6	6
WC	(Jamaica) Blaise Bicknell	4	4
(United States) Zachary Svajda	3	6^{6}
22	(Argentina) Diego Schwartzman	6	7^{8}

Qualifying competition
5	(France) Arthur Rinderknech	6	3	6^{1}
22	(Argentina) Diego Schwartzman	3	6	7^{7}

==== Sixth qualifier ====
First round
6	(France) Hugo Gaston	2	6	2
WC	(Hong Kong) Coleman Wong	6	3	6
(Canada) Gabriel Diallo	6^{3}	2
16	(India) Sumit Nagal	7^{7}	6

Qualifying competition
WC	(Hong Kong) Coleman Wong	3	6	7
16	(India) Sumit Nagal	6	1	5

==== Seventh qualifier ====
First round
7	(Chile) Cristian Garín	3	4
(Monaco) Valentin Vacherot	6	6
(Italy) Andrea Vavassori	4	7^{7}	7^{7}
23	(Croatia) Duje Ajduković	6	6^{2}	6^{5}

Qualifying competition
(Monaco) Valentin Vacherot	2	6	6^{3}
(Italy) Andrea Vavassori	6	4	7^{7}

==== Eighth qualifier ====
First round
8	(Spain) Pedro Martínez	6	6
WC	(Belgium) Alexander Blockx	2	2
(Australia) Adam Walton	6^{5}	7^{7}	6
20	(Brazil) Thiago Monteiro	7^{7}	6^{3}	4

Qualifying competition
8	(Spain) Pedro Martínez	6	2	3
(Australia) Adam Walton	3	6	6

==== Ninth qualifier ====
First round
9	(United States) Aleksandar Kovacevic	6	7^{7}
(United States) Patrick Kypson	2	6^{5}
(Brazil) Felipe Meligeni Alves	6	1	4
24	(Belgium) Zizou Bergs	2	6	6

Qualifying competition
9	(United States) Aleksandar Kovacevic	7^{7}	6
24	(Belgium) Zizou Bergs	6^{2}	2

==== Tenth qualifier ====
First round
10	(United States) Brandon Nakashima	2	7^{7}	6
(United States) Michael Mmoh	6	6^{4}	4
(France) Térence Atmane	6	6
Alt	(Kazakhstan) Mikhail Kukushkin	4	4

Qualifying competition
10	(United States) Brandon Nakashima	1
(France) Térence Atmane	1^{r}

==== Eleventh qualifier ====
First round
11	(United States) J. J. Wolf	6	7
WC	(United States) Eliot Spizzirri	3	5
WC	(Japan) Rei Sakamoto	6^{5}	6^{5}
21	(Czech Republic) Vít Kopřiva	7^{7}	7^{7}

Qualifying competition
11	(United States) J. J. Wolf	3	6	4
21	(Czech Republic) Vít Kopřiva	6	1	6

==== Twelfth qualifier ====
First round
12	(Austria) Jurij Rodionov	7^{7}	6^{7}	2
(Finland) Otto Virtanen	6^{3}	7^{9}	6
(Germany) Benjamin Hassan	6^{7}	4
13	(Spain) Roberto Bautista Agut	7^{9}	6

Qualifying competition
(Finland) Otto Virtanen	4	6	4
13	(Spain) Roberto Bautista Agut	6	4	6
