= Darwin Blanch =

American tennis player (born 2007)

- Blanch at the 2026 Wimbledon Championships
- Country (sports): United States
- Born: September 28, 2007 (age 19) Boca Raton, Florida, US
- Height: 6 ft 4 in (1.93 m)
- Plays: Left-handed (two-handed backhanded)
- Coach: Juan Ignacio Chela (Nov 2025-), Mariano Monachesi, Fran Penalva
- Prize money: US $668,565

Singles
- Career record: 2–8 (at ATP Tour level, Grand Slam level, and in Davis Cup)
- Career titles: 0
- Highest ranking: No. 139 (November 2, 2026)
- Current ranking: No. 151 (November 16, 2026)

Grand Slam singles results
- French Open: Q3 (2026)
- Wimbledon: Q2 (2026)
- US Open: 1R (2025, 2026)

Doubles
- Career record: 0–0 (at ATP Tour level, Grand Slam level, and in Davis Cup)
- Career titles: 0
- Highest ranking: No. 1,093 (May 4, 2026)
- Current ranking: No. 1,125 (November 2, 2026)
- Last updated on: 16 November 2026.

Darwin Blanch (born September 28, 2007) is an American professional tennis player. He has a career-high ATP singles ranking of world No. 139 achieved in November 2026.

== Early life ==
Blanch was raised in Deerfield Beach, Florida. He started taking tennis lessons as a kid alongside his siblings Ulises, Dali and Krystal, who all currently play tennis at professional level. Their father Ernesto, who is of Spanish descent, was an international manager for Coca-Cola. Because of that, the family moved around the world with his job. His parents moved the whole family to Orlando, Florida, where the children could train at the USTA National Campus.

Blanch has trained at Juan Carlos Ferrero Academy in Alicante, Spain. During a practice session when Blanch was selected as a hitting partner of Carlos Alcaraz, the then-world No. 1 suffered an injury causing the Spaniard to miss the 2023 Australian Open.

== Junior career ==
In August 2022, Blanch won the USTA U-16 title as a fourteen-year-old.

Playing in the boys' singles category at the 2023 French Open, he defeated junior world No. 1 Rodrigo Pacheco Méndez and compatriot Cooper Williams on his way to the semifinals. Later that season, he reached another major junior semifinal in singles at the 2023 Wimbledon.

Blanch had good results on the Junior circuit, maintaining a 71–35 singles win-loss record. He reached a junior combined ranking of world No. 4 on 22 January 2024.

Blanch was part of the American team which finished third at the 2023 Junior Davis Cup, with Maxwell Exsted and Jagger Leach.

== Professional career ==
=== 2022-2023: First ATP point ===
In February 2022, Blanch became the second youngest player to score an ATP ranking point when he defeated Gerald Planelles in three sets at an ITF tournament in Villena, Spain. At 14 years and five months, he was two months older than the Spaniard Nicolás Álvarez Varona (14 years and three months) when he scored an ATP point in 2015.

=== 2024: Masters debut ===
In March 2024, Blanch received a wildcard into the main draw in singles at the 2024 Miami Open for his ATP Tour-level debut. He was defeated in straight sets by Tomáš Macháč. The following month, he was given a wildcard to the 2024 Madrid Open and lost in the first round against Rafael Nadal, also in straight sets.

=== 2025-2026: Major & top 250 debuts, first ATP win ===
In August 2025, Blanch earned a wildcard for the singles main draw of the 2025 US Open after he defeated Jack Satterfield to win the USTA National Boy’s 18s Championships in Kalamazoo, Michigan. At the 2025 Winston-Salem Open, after he received a wildcard and qualified for the main draw, Blanch recorded his first ATP win over Borna Ćorić.

In April 2026, he made the semifinals at the 2026 Sarasota Open.

On Sunday, September 20, 2026, Darwin Blanch won his first career ATP Challenger title at the 125-level event in Tiburon, California, defeating Michael Mmoh 3–6, 6–4, 6–2 in the final. Milestone: At 18 years old, Blanch became the youngest player ever to win a 125-level Challenger event (also at the newly upgraded ATP 125 Tiburon Challenger) and secured his debut inside the ATP Top 200 rankings.

== Coaching ==
Blanch began training in November 2025 with former professional Juan Ignacio Chela in Florida.

== Performance timeline ==
Key
| W | F | SF | QF | #R | RR | Q# | DNQ | A | NH |

(W) winner; (F) finalist; (SF) semifinalist; (QF) quarterfinalist; (#R) rounds 4, 3, 2, 1; (RR) round-robin stage; (Q#) qualification round; (DNQ) did not qualify; (A) absent; (NH) not held; (SR) strike rate (events won / competed); (W–L) win–loss record.
To avoid confusion and double counting, these charts are updated at the conclusion of a tournament or when the player's participation has ended.

=== Singles ===
Current through the 2026 Wimbledon Championships.

| Tournament | 2024 | 2025 | 2026 | SR | W–L | Win % |
|---|---|---|---|---|---|---|
Grand Slam tournaments
| Australian Open | A | A | A | 0 / 0 | 0–0 | – |
| French Open | A | A | Q3 | 0 / 0 | 0–0 | – |
| Wimbledon | A | A | Q2 | 0 / 0 | 0–0 | – |
| US Open | A | 1R | | 0 / 1 | 0–1 | 0% |
| Win–loss | 0–0 | 0–1 | | 0 / 1 | 0–1 | 0% |
ATP Masters 1000
| Indian Wells Open | A | A | Q1 | 0 / 0 | 0–0 | – |
| Miami Open | 1R | Q2 | 2R | 0 / 2 | 1–2 | 33% |
| Monte Carlo Masters | A | A | A | 0 / 0 | 0–0 | – |
| Madrid Open | 1R | Q1 | Q1 | 0 / 1 | 0–1 | 0% |
| Italian Open | A | A | A | 0 / 0 | 0–0 | – |
| Canadian Open | A | A | | 0 / 0 | 0–0 | – |
| Cincinnati Masters | A | A | | 0 / 0 | 0–0 | – |
| Shanghai Masters | A | A | | 0 / 0 | 0–0 | – |
| Paris Masters | A | A | | 0 / 0 | 0–0 | – |
| Win–loss | 0–2 | 0–0 | 1–1 | 0 / 3 | 1–3 | 25% |

== ATP Challenger and ITF World Tennis Tour finals ==
=== Singles: 8 (3 titles, 5 runner-ups) ===
| Legend ATP Challenger Tour (1–2) ITF WTT (2–3) | Finals by surface Hard (3–5) Clay (–) |

| Result | W–L | Date | Tournament | Tier | Surface | Opponent | Score |
|---|---|---|---|---|---|---|---|
| Loss | 0–1 | Nov 2025 | Knoxville Challenger, US | Challenger | Hard (i) | (United States) Mitchell Krueger | 7–6^{(7–2)}, 4–6, 1–6 |
| Win | 1–1 | Sep 2026 | Tiburon Challenger, US | Challenger | Hard | (United States) Michael Mmoh | 3–6, 6–4, 6–2 |
| Loss | 1–2 | Oct 2026 | Fort Worth Challenger, US | Challenger | Hard | (United States) Jenson Brooksby | 1–6, 4–6 |

| Result | W–L | Date | Tournament | Tier | Surface | Opponent | Score |
|---|---|---|---|---|---|---|---|
| Loss | 0–1 | Jul 2024 | M15 Monastir, Tunisia | WTT | Hard | (Ivory Coast) Eliakim Coulibaly | 2–6, 2–6 |
| Loss | 0–2 | Nov 2024 | M15 Madrid, Spain | WTT | Hard | (Bulgaria) Iliyan Radulov | 4–6, 5–7 |
| Win | 1–2 | Feb 2025 | M15 Villena, Spain | WTT | Hard | (United Kingdom) Oliver Crawford | 1–6, 7–5, 7–5 |
| Win | 2–2 | Jun 2025 | M25 Martos, Spain | WTT | Hard | (France) Clément Chidekh | 7–6^{(7–4)}, 6–3 |
| Loss | 2–3 | Jun 2025 | M25 Figueira da Foz, Portugal | WTT | Hard | (Portugal) Tiago Pereira | 2–6, 1–6 |
