= Jenson Brooksby =

American tennis player (born 2000)

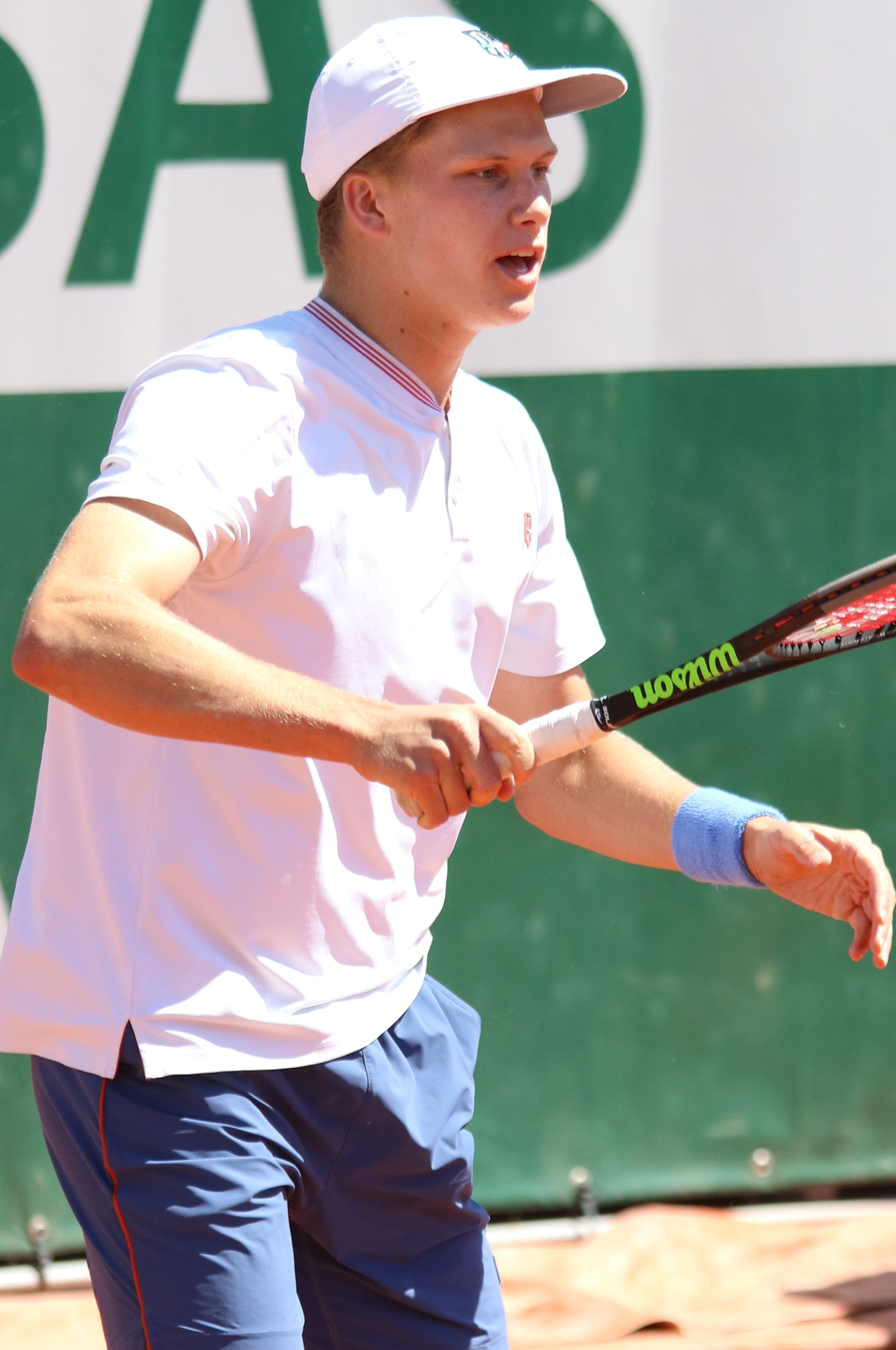
- Brooksby at the 2021 French Open
- Full name: Jenson Tyler Brooksby
- Country (sports): United States
- Residence: Carmichael, California, United States
- Born: October 26, 2000 (age 26) Sacramento, California, United States
- Height: 6 ft 4 in (1.93 m)
- Turned pro: 2021
- Plays: Right-handed (two-handed backhand)
- College: Baylor
- Coach: Amrit Narasimhan
- Prize money: US $4,828,013

Singles
- Career record: 78–68
- Career titles: 1
- Highest ranking: No. 33 (June 13, 2022)
- Current ranking: No. 93 (November 9, 2026)

Grand Slam singles results
- Australian Open: 3R (2023)
- French Open: 2R (2025)
- Wimbledon: 3R (2022, 2026)
- US Open: 4R (2021)

Doubles
- Career record: 0–4
- Career titles: 0
- Highest ranking: No. 1,403 (November 18, 2019)

Grand Slam doubles results
- French Open: 1R (2025)
- Wimbledon: 1R (2025)
- US Open: 1R (2026)

Grand Slam mixed doubles results
- US Open: 1R (2019)
- Last updated on: August 31, 2026.

Jenson Tyler "J. T." Brooksby (born October 26, 2000) is an American professional tennis player. He has a career-high ATP singles ranking of world No. 33, achieved on June 13, 2022. Brooksby has won one ATP Tour singles title at the 2025 U.S. Men's Clay Court Championships.

== Early life ==
Jenson Tyler Brooksby was born on October 26, 2000 in Sacramento, California to parents Glen, an anesthesiologist, and Tania. He is autistic and has stated he was nonverbal until the age of four. Brooksby is named after racing driver Jenson Button.

== Collegiate career ==
Brooksby enrolled at Baylor University to play college tennis, but turned pro after he redshirted his freshman season due to injury.

== Professional career ==
=== 2018: Grand Slam debut ===
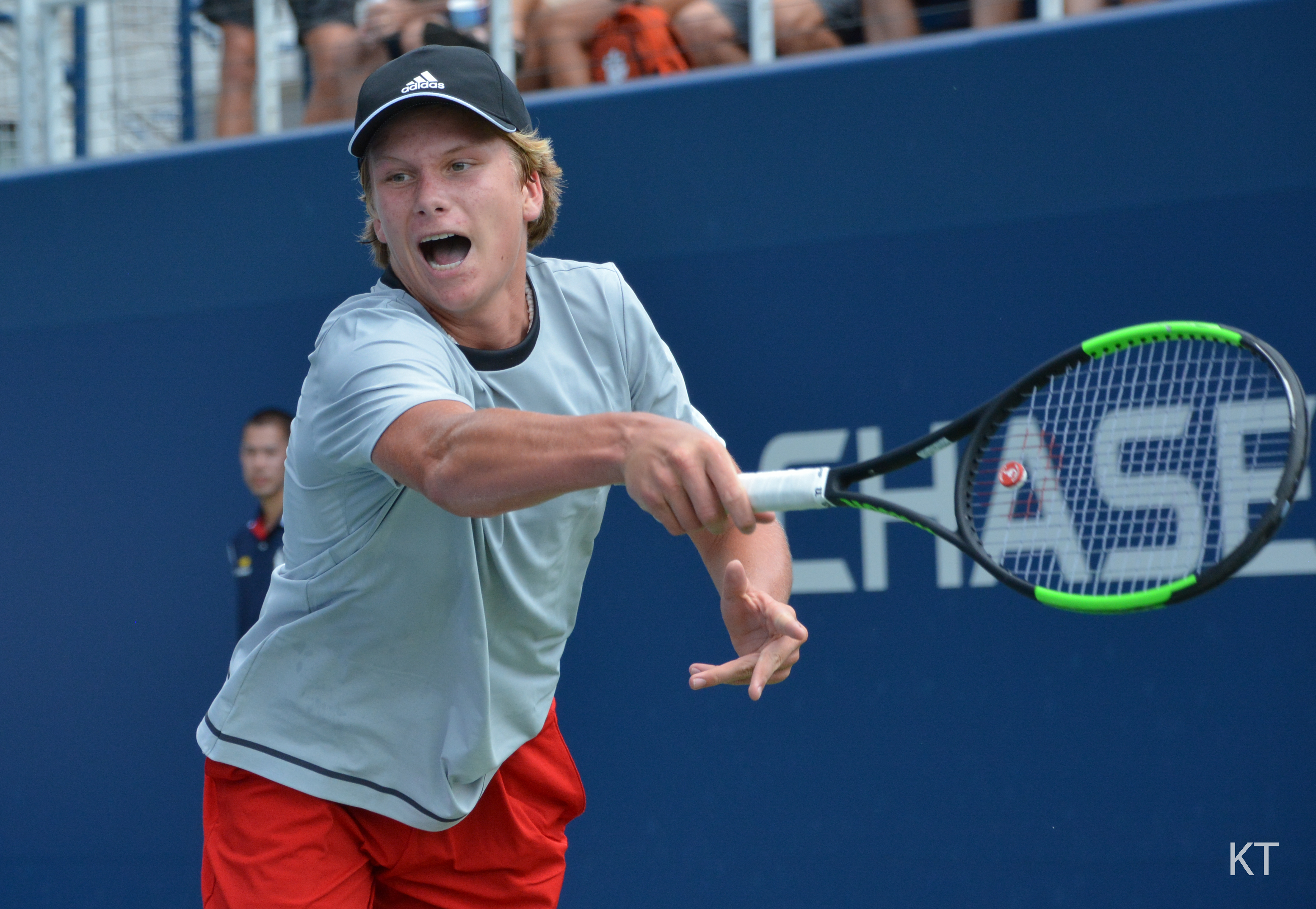
Brooksby at the 2018 US Open.

On August 12, 2018, Brooksby defeated Brandon Nakashima to win the USTA Boys' under-18 national championship. This victory earned him a wild card into the main draw of the US Open. He lost in the first round to eventual quarterfinalist John Millman.

=== 2019: US Open second round ===
On August 23, 2019, Brooksby qualified for the main draw of the US Open, where he defeated Tomáš Berdych in four sets in the first round. This was Berdych's last professional match. However, in the second round, Brooksby went down in a four-set match to 17th seed Nikoloz Basilashvili of Georgia.

=== 2021: First ATP final, US Open fourth round ===
In 2021, Brooksby won three Challenger trophies, at Potchefstroom-2, Orlando-1, and Tallahassee. He made his debut in the top 150 by reaching a then career high of world No. 149 on June 14, 2021.

He also reached his first ATP tour final at the 2021 Hall of Fame Open in Newport, defeating Evgeny Donskoy, Denis Kudla, Peter Gojowczyk, and 7th seed Jordan Thompson. He became the second-youngest player to reach the final in the 45-year tournament history on Newport's grass courts. He lost to 8th seed Kevin Anderson in the final. This result brought Brooksby up to a new career high of No. 126 on July 19, 2021.

At the 2021 Citi Open, Brooksby upset 2nd seed and 15th ranked Félix Auger-Aliassime to earn his first top 50 (and top 20) win and advance into his first ATP 500 level quarterfinal. He beat John Millman to advance to his first ATP 500 semifinal, where he lost to 5th seed (and eventual champion) Jannik Sinner. As a result of this run, Brooksby entered the top 100 for the first time, becoming world No. 99 on August 9, 2021.

The following week at the 2021 National Bank Open, Brooksby made his debut at ATP 1000 level but lost in the first round to Nikoloz Basilashvili.

Brooksby then received a singles wildcard into the US Open. He reached the fourth round of a Major for the first time, defeating Mikael Ymer, compatriot Taylor Fritz, and 21st seed Aslan Karatsev. Brooksby, aged 20, became the youngest American to reach the US Open fourth round since a then 20-year-old Andy Roddick did so in 2002. Brooksby defeated Karatsev in the 31st five-setter of the tournament – tied with 2015 Wimbledon for most at a Grand Slam event, since 34 at the 2004 US Open. He then lost to world No. 1 Novak Djokovic in four sets.

As a qualifier at the 2021 European Open, Brooksby reached the semifinals where he lost to Diego Schwartzman. As a result he reached a new career-high ranking of No. 59 on October 25, 2021.

Brooksby qualified for the 2021 Next Generation ATP Finals but did not play due to injury.

=== 2022: Major third round, two finals, top 35 ===
At the 2022 Dallas Open, Brooksby made his second ATP final where he lost to Reilly Opelka. As a result, he moved into the top 50 for the first time at world No. 45 on 14 February 2022.

At the 2022 BNP Paribas Open, Brooksby reached the fourth round of a Masters 1000 for the first time in his career, defeating World No. 5 Stefanos Tsitsipas for his first top 10 win. He repeated the feat at the 2022 Miami Open reaching the fourth round in his consecutive Masters 1000 where he lost to the top seed and World No. 2 Daniil Medvedev.

He reached a career-high of No. 34 on 16 May 2022 after a third round showing at the Masters 1000 in Rome.

On his debut, he reached the third round of the 2022 Wimbledon Championships for the first time at this Major where he lost to Christian Garin.

Seeded 6th at the 2022 Atlanta Open, he reached the second round after defeating Benoît Paire in straight sets. Next he defeated Mackenzie McDonald in straight sets to reach the quarterfinals. He then reached the semifinals after defeating 6-time champion and No. 2 seed John Isner, who saved four match points in the third set. He then advanced to the finals after defeating Frances Tiafoe. He lost to 2019 champion Alex de Minaur in straight sets.

=== 2023–2024: Australian third round, top 3 win, suspension ===
On his debut at the 2023 Australian Open, he reached the third round defeating second seed and world No. 3 Casper Ruud for his first top-3 win.

In March he underwent wrist surgery which took him off court for 10–14 weeks.

In July 2023, Brooksby was provisionally suspended from competing by the International Tennis Integrity Agency for an anti-doping rule violation in relation to three missed tests. In October, he was issued with a 18-month suspension, which was later reduced to a 13-month suspension backdated to his last missed test, with the suspension subsequently lifted in March 2024.

=== 2025: Comeback, ATP title, fifth final, back to Top 50 ===
Brooksby made his return at the 2025 Australian Open, where he entered using a protected ranking. He lost to fellow countryman Taylor Fritz in straight sets in the first round.

Ranked No. 937, Brooksby won his first match since 2023 at the 2025 BNP Paribas Open defeating Benjamin Bonzi and then upset 17th seed Félix Auger-Aliassime to reach the third round. He lost to eventual champion Jack Draper.

Ranked No. 507 at the 2025 U.S. Men's Clay Court Championships, using a wildcard, Brooksby qualified for the main draw and defeated third seed Alejandro Tabilo in three sets, saving three match points, to reach his first quarterfinal since 2022 and first on clay. Brooksby went on to claim the title after beating first and second seeds Tommy Paul and Frances Tiafoe in the semifinals and finals, respectively. He became the third lowest-ranked champion in ATP history.

At the 2025 Eastbourne International, Brooksby became the first lucky loser in tournament history to reach the final - once again losing to Taylor Fritz in straight sets. Brooksby returned to the Top 100 on 14 July 2025, after defeating 31st seed Tallon Griekspoor in straight sets at the 2025 Wimbledon Championships. He lost to João Fonseca in the second round in a four-set match.

Brooksby continued his form by reaching the third round of the 2025 Cincinnati Open where he lost to Karen Khachanov. Returning to the US Open after a two-year absence, he narrowly lost in the second round to Flavio Cobolli after an intense five-set thriller that ended in a tiebreak. Brooksby joined the 2025 Laver Cup as an alternate for Team World.

Making his Japan Open debut in Tokyo, Brooksby defeated previous year runner-up and sixth seed Ugo Humbert in straight sets and then stunned fans and spectators by beating No. 13 Holger Rune en route to the semifinals. Brooksby lost for the third time to Taylor Fritz but returned to the top 55 in the singles rankings on 20 October 2025.

Brooksby became one of a handful of players, including Alcaraz and Sinner, to get into a semifinal on all three surfaces during the 2025 season.

=== 2026: Three QFS, Wimbledon R3, Challengers title ===
Brooksby reached the 2026 Dubai Tennis Championships quarterfinals after defeating world No. 17 Karen Khachanov.

After a nine-match losing streak, Brooksby made it to R16 of the Queens Championship losing to seventh seed Francisco Cerúndolo.

Brooksby made it to round 3 of the Wimbledon Championships, after defeating 31st seed Ignacio Buse, where he lost to defending champion Jannik Sinner.

Brooksby defeated sixth seed Corentin Moutet to reach the quarterfinals of the 2026 Los Cabos Open, where he lost to Coleman Wong.

On his Chengdu debut, Brooksby made it to the quarterfinals, defeating eighth seed Baez in the process.

As the top seed, Brooksby beat second seed Darwin Blanch in straight sets at the inaugural Fort Worth Challenger.

== Playing style ==
Brooksby is a defensive baseliner, who specialises in winning baseline rallies and employs a counterpunching style of play frequently.

Brooksby’s playing style and shot mechanics has been called "unorthodox" by his peers. His game is built on his movement and redirection of the ball. He has short take backs on his groundstrokes so he can disguise his shots on both sides. His serve is widely considered to be his greatest weakness, despite his height. He also has a rally tolerance, able to outlast and grind down his opponents in long rallies.

== Personal life ==
Brooksby plays the piano. He started learning and playing the piano at age 9, and says it is a relaxing and fun skill to be able to read music and play his own notes.

== Performance timeline ==
Key
W	F	SF	QF	#R	RR	Q#	P#	DNQ	A	Z#	PO	G	S	B	NMS	NTI	P	NH

(W) winner; (F) finalist; (SF) semifinalist; (QF) quarterfinalist; (#R) rounds 4, 3, 2, 1; (RR) round-robin stage; (Q#) qualification round; (P#) preliminary round; (DNQ) did not qualify; (A) absent; (Z#) Davis/Fed Cup Zonal Group (with number indication) or (PO) play-off; (G) gold, (S) silver or (B) bronze Olympic/Paralympic medal; (NMS) not a Masters tournament; (NTI) not a Tier I tournament; (P) postponed; (NH) not held; (SR) strike rate (events won / competed); (W–L) win–loss record.
To avoid confusion and double counting, these charts are updated at the conclusion of a tournament or when the player's participation has ended.

=== Singles ===
Current through the 2026 Shanghai Masters.

Tournament	2018	2019	2020	2021	2022	2023	2024	2025	2026	SR	W–L	Win %
Grand Slam tournaments
Australian Open	A	A	A	A	A	3R	A	1R	1R	0 / 3	2–3	40%
French Open	A	A	A	1R	1R	A	A	2R	1R	0 / 4	1–4	20%
Wimbledon	A	A	NH	A	3R	A	A	2R	3R	0 / 3	5–3	63%
US Open	1R	2R	A	4R	3R	A	A	2R	1R	0 / 6	7–6	54%
Win–loss	0–1	1–1	0–0	3–2	4–3	2–1	0–0	3–4	2–4	0 / 16	15–16	48%
ATP 1000 tournaments
Indian Wells Open	A	A	NH	2R	4R	A	A	3R	2R	0 / 4	7–4	64%
Miami Open	A	A	NH	Q2	4R	A	A	1R	1R	0 / 3	3–3	50%
Monte-Carlo Masters	A	A	NH	A	A	A	A	A	A	0 / 0	0–0	–
Madrid Open	A	A	NH	A	1R	A	A	A	1R	0 / 2	0–2	0%
Italian Open	A	A	A	A	3R	A	A	A	1R	0 / 2	2–2	50%
Canadian Open	A	A	NH	1R	2R	A	A	1R	2R	0 / 4	2–4	33%
Cincinnati Open	A	A	A	A	1R	A	A	3R	1R	0 / 3	2–3	40%
Shanghai Masters	A	A	NH			A	A	2R	2R	0 / 2	2–2	50%
Paris Masters	A	A	A	~~1R~~ (Note: 2021 Paris Masters does not count towards total tournaments played nor are matches included in the win-loss column due to Brooksby withdrawing from the main draw after successfully qualifying because of an abdominal injury.)	A	A	A	Q1		0 / 0	0–0	–
Win–loss	0–0	0–0	0–0	1–2	9–6	0–0	0–0	5–5	3–7	0 / 20	18–20	47%
Career statistics
Tournaments	1	1	0	7	22	2	0	16	23	Career total: 72		
Titles	0	0	0	0	0	0	0	1	0	Career total: 1		
Finals	0	0	0	1	2	0	0	2	0	Career total: 5		
Overall win–loss	0–1	1–1	0–0	15–7	24–22	5–2	0–0	21–15	15–23	1 / 72	81–71	53%
Year-end ranking	978	269	307	56	48	297	—	50		$4,367,076		

== ATP Tour finals ==
=== Singles: 5 (1 title, 4 runner-ups) ===
Legend Grand Slam (0–0) ATP 1000 (0–0) ATP 500 (0–0) ATP 250 (1–4)	Finals by surface Hard (0–2) Clay (1–0) Grass (0–2)	Finals by setting Outdoor (1–3) Indoor (0–1)

Result	W–L	Date	Tournament	Tier	Surface	Opponent	Score
Loss	0–1	Jul 2021	Hall of Fame Open, United States	ATP 250	Grass	(South Africa) Kevin Anderson	6–7^{(8–10)}, 4–6
Loss	0–2	Feb 2022	Dallas Open, United States	ATP 250	Hard (i)	(United States) Reilly Opelka	6–7^{(5–7)}, 6–7^{(3–7)}
Loss	0–3	Jul 2022	Atlanta Open, United States	ATP 250	Hard	(Australia) Alex de Minaur	3–6, 3–6
Win	1–3	Mar 2025	U.S. Men's Clay Court Championships, United States	ATP 250	Clay	(United States) Frances Tiafoe	6–4, 6–2
Loss	1–4	Jun 2025	Eastbourne Open, United Kingdom	ATP 250	Grass	(United States) Taylor Fritz	5–7, 1–6

== ATP Challenger and ITF World Tennis Tour finals ==
=== Singles: 8 (7 titles, 1 runner-up) ===
Legend ATP Challenger Tour (4–1) ITF WTT (3–0)	Finals by surface Hard (6–1) Clay (1–0)

Result	W–L	Date	Tournament	Tier	Surface	Opponent	Score
Win	1–0	Feb 2021	Potchefstroom Open, South Africa	Challenger	Hard	(Russia) Teymuraz Gabashvili	2–6, 6–3, 6–0
Loss	1–1	Mar 2021	Cleveland Open, US	Challenger	Hard (i)	(United States) Bjorn Fratangelo	5–7, 4–6
Win	2–1	Apr 2021	Orlando Open, US	Challenger	Hard	(United States) Denis Kudla	6–3, 6–3
Win	3–1	Apr 2021	Tallahassee Tennis Challenger, US	Challenger	Clay	(United States) Bjorn Fratangelo	6–3, 4–6, 6–3
Win	4–1	Oct 2026	Forth Worth Challenger, US	Challenger	Hard	(United States) Darwin Blanch	6–1, 6–4

Result	W–L	Date	Tournament	Tier	Surface	Opponent	Score
Win	1–0	Mar 2019	M25 Bakersfield, US	WTT	Hard	(Australia) Aleksandar Vukic	6–3, 6–1
Win	2–0	Jul 2019	M25 Champaign, US	WTT	Hard	(United States) Oliver Crawford	6–2, 6–1
Win	3–0	Jul 2019	M25 Decatur, US	WTT	Hard	(Argentina) Santiago Rodríguez Taverna	6–1, 6–4

== Wins over top 10 players ==
- Brooksby has a 2–14 record against players who were, at the time the match was played, ranked in the top 10.

Season	2022	2023	2024	2025	2026	Total
Wins	1	1	0	0	0	2

#	Player	Rk	Event	Surface	Rd	Score	Rk	Ref
2022
1.	(Greece) Stefanos Tsitsipas	5	Indian Wells Open, United States	Hard	3R	1–6, 6–3, 6–2	43	
2023
2.	(Norway) Casper Ruud	3	Australian Open, Australia	Hard	2R	6–3, 7–5, 6–7^{(4–7)}, 6–2	39	

*As of 31 August 2026

== Notes ==
Awards
Preceded by (Spain) Carlos Alcaraz	ATP Newcomer of the Year; 2021	Succeeded by (Denmark) Holger Rune
