= Albert Pedrico Kravtsov =

Spanish tennis player (born 2005)

- Country (sports): Spain
- Born: 12 June 2005 (age 21) Lleida, Spain
- Height: 1.83 m (6 ft 0 in)
- Plays: Right-handed (one-handed backhand)
- College: TCU
- Prize money: US $27,513

Singles
- Career record: 0–0 (at ATP Tour level, Grand Slam level, and in Davis Cup)
- Career titles: 0
- Highest ranking: No. 682 (18 August 2025)
- Current ranking: No. 1,401 (26 October 2026)

Doubles
- Career record: 0–0 (at ATP Tour level, Grand Slam level, and in Davis Cup)
- Career titles: 1 Challenger, 2 ITF
- Highest ranking: No. 504 (2 November 2026)
- Current ranking: No. 504 (2 November 2026)
- Last updated on: 2 November 2026.

Albert Pedrico Kravtsov (born 12 June 2005) is a Spanish tennis player. He has a career high ATP singles ranking of No. 682 achieved on 18 August 2025 and a career high ATP doubles ranking of No. 504 achieved on 2 November 2026.

Pedrico Kravtsov has won one ATP Challenger doubles title at the 2026 Fort Worth Challenger.

Pedrico Kravtsov plays college tennis at TCU.
