= 2023 Dallas Open =

- Date: 6–12 February 2023
- Edition: 2nd
- Category: ATP Tour 250
- Draw: 28S / 16D
- Prize money: $822,175
- Surface: Hard (indoor)
- Location: Dallas, United States
- Venue: Styslinger/Altec Tennis Complex

Champions

Singles
- (China) Wu Yibing

Doubles
- (United Kingdom) Jamie Murray / (New Zealand) Michael Venus
← 2022 ·	Dallas Open	· 2024 →

The 2023 Dallas Open was a men's tennis tournament played on indoor hard courts. It was the 2nd edition of the Dallas Open, and part of the ATP Tour 250 series on the 2023 ATP Tour. It took place at the Styslinger/Altec Tennis Complex in the city of Dallas, United States, between February 6–12, 2023.

== Finals ==
=== Singles ===
- (China) Wu Yibing def. (United States) John Isner, 6–7^{(4–7)}, 7–6^{(7–3)}, 7–6^{(14–12)}

=== Doubles ===
- (United Kingdom) Jamie Murray / (New Zealand) Michael Venus def. (United States) Nathaniel Lammons / (United States) Jackson Withrow, 1–6, 7–6^{(7–4)}, [10–7]

== Points and prize money ==
=== Point distribution ===
Event	W	F	SF	QF	Round of 16	Round of 32	Q	Q2	Q1
Singles	250	150	90	45	20	0	12	6	0
Doubles	250	150	90	45	0	—	—	—	—

=== Prize money ===
Event	W	F	SF	QF	Round of 16	Round of 32	Q2	Q1
Singles	$112,125	$65,405	$38,450	$22,280	$12,940	$7,905	$3,955	$2,155
Doubles*	$38,960	$20,850	$12,230	$6,830	$4,020	—	—	—
Doubles prize money per team

== Singles main draw entrants ==
=== Seeds ===
Country	Player	Ranking^{1}	Seed
USA	Taylor Fritz	8	1
USA	Frances Tiafoe	15	2
CAN	Denis Shapovalov	27	3
SRB	Miomir Kecmanović	34	4
USA	John Isner	42	5
USA	J. J. Wolf	48	6
USA	Marcos Giron	57	7
FRA	Adrian Mannarino	58	8

- ^{1} Rankings are as of 30 January 2023.

=== Other entrants ===
The following players received wildcards into the main draw:

- (United States) Liam Krall
- (United States) Jack Sock
- (Canada) Denis Shapovalov

The following players received entry from the qualifying draw:

- (United States) Brandon Holt
- (United States) Alex Rybakov
- (United States) Zachary Svajda
- (Spain) Fernando Verdasco

The following player received entry as a lucky loser:

- (Canada) Gabriel Diallo

=== Withdrawals ===
- (United States) Jenson Brooksby → replaced by (United States) Steve Johnson
- (Japan) Taro Daniel → replaced by (Canada) Gabriel Diallo
- (South Korea) Kwon Soon-woo → replaced by (United States) Michael Mmoh
- (Czech Republic) Jiří Lehečka → replaced by (Chinese Taipei) Tseng Chun-hsin
- (United States) Brandon Nakashima → replaced by (United States) Christopher Eubanks
- (United States) Reilly Opelka → replaced by (China) Wu Yibing
- (United States) Ben Shelton → replaced by (United States) Denis Kudla

== Doubles main draw entrants ==
=== Seeds ===
Country	Player	Country	Player	Rank^{1}	Seed
GBR	Jamie Murray	NZL	Michael Venus	50	1
USA	Nathaniel Lammons	USA	Jackson Withrow	94	2
GBR	Julian Cash	GBR	Henry Patten	127	3
SWE	André Göransson	JPN	Ben McLachlan	145	4

- ^{1} Rankings as of 30 January 2023.

=== Other entrants ===
The following pairs received wildcards into the doubles main draw:

- (United States) Mitchell Krueger / (United States) Thai-Son Kwiatkowski
- (United States) Pranav Kumar / (United States) Adam Neff

=== Withdrawals ===
- (United States) Marcos Giron / (United States) Brandon Nakashima → replaced by (United States) Christopher Eubanks / (United States) Marcos Giron
- (United States) Reilly Opelka / (United States) Ben Shelton → replaced by (Moldova) Radu Albot / (Australia) Jordan Thompson
