= 2022 Dallas Open – Doubles =

Doubles
- 2022 Dallas Open

Final
- Champions: (El Salvador) Marcelo Arévalo (Netherlands) Jean-Julien Rojer
- Runners-up: (United Kingdom) Lloyd Glasspool (Finland) Harri Heliövaara
- Score: 7–6^{(7–4)}, 6–4

Events
Singles	Doubles
Dallas Open	· 2023 →

This was the first edition of the tournament.

Marcelo Arévalo and Jean-Julien Rojer won the title, defeating Lloyd Glasspool and Harri Heliövaara in the final, 7–6^{(7–4)}, 6–4.

== Seeds ==
1. (El Salvador) Marcelo Arévalo / (Netherlands) Jean-Julien Rojer (champions)
2. (United States) Austin Krajicek / (Monaco) Hugo Nys (first round)
3. (Kazakhstan) Aleksandr Nedovyesov / (Pakistan) Aisam-ul-Haq Qureshi (first round)
4. (Australia) Luke Saville / (Australia) John-Patrick Smith (first round)

== Draw ==
=== Key ===
- Q = Qualifier
- WC = Wild card
- LL = Lucky loser
- Alt = Alternate
- SE = Special exempt
- PR = Protected ranking
- ITF = ITF entry
- JE = Junior exempt
- w/o = Walkover
- r = Retired
- d = Defaulted
- SR = Special ranking

=== Draw ===
First round
1	(El Salvador) M Arévalo (Netherlands) J-J Rojer	7	7^{7}
(Serbia) I Sabanov (Serbia) M Sabanov	5	6^{5}
Alt	(United States) E King (United States) A Lawson	5	5
(United States) M Giron (United States) B Nakashima	7	7
4	(Australia) L Saville (Australia) J-P Smith	6^{3}	6^{2}
(Sweden) A Göransson (United States) N Lammons	7^{7}	7^{7}
WC	(United States) A Neff (United States) I Thamma	6^{8}	6	[5]
(United States) S Querrey (United States) J Withrow	7^{10}	4	[10]
(Germany) D Altmaier (Italy) A Seppi	0	7	[9]
(Germany) P Gojowczyk (Germany) O Otte	6	5	[11]
WC	(United States) J Isner (United States) J Sock	7^{7}	6
3	(Kazakhstan) A Nedovyesov (Pakistan) A-u-H Qureshi	6^{3}	4
(Mexico) H Hach Verdugo (Mexico) MÁ Reyes-Varela	6	7
Alt	(United States) D Kudla (Canada) B Schnur	3	5
(United Kingdom) L Glasspool (Finland) H Heliövaara	7^{7}	3	[10]
2	(United States) A Krajicek (Monaco) H Nys	6^{4}	6	[8]

Quarterfinals
1	(El Salvador) M Arévalo (Netherlands) J-J Rojer	6	7^{7}
(United States) M Giron (United States) B Nakashima	1	6^{4}
(Sweden) A Göransson (United States) N Lammons	6^{4}	6^{3}
(United States) S Querrey (United States) J Withrow	7^{7}	7^{7}
(Germany) P Gojowczyk (Germany) O Otte	0	6^{2}
WC	(United States) J Isner (United States) J Sock	6	7^{7}
(Mexico) H Hach Verdugo (Mexico) MÁ Reyes-Varela	1	6^{4}
(United Kingdom) L Glasspool (Finland) H Heliövaara	6	7^{7}

Semifinals
1	(El Salvador) M Arévalo (Netherlands) J-J Rojer	7	7^{7}
(United States) S Querrey (United States) J Withrow	5	6^{4}
WC	(United States) J Isner (United States) J Sock	7^{7}	5	[8]
(United Kingdom) L Glasspool (Finland) H Heliövaara	6^{4}	7	[10]

Final
1	(El Salvador) M Arévalo (Netherlands) J-J Rojer	7^{7}	6
(United Kingdom) L Glasspool (Finland) H Heliövaara	6^{4}	4
