= 2022 Dallas Open – Singles =

Singles
- 2022 Dallas Open

Final
- Champion: (United States) Reilly Opelka
- Runner-up: (United States) Jenson Brooksby
- Score: 7–6^{(7–5)}, 7–6^{(7–3)}

Details
- Draw: 28 (4Q, 3WC)
- Seeds: 8

Events
Singles	Doubles
Dallas Open	· 2023 →

Reilly Opelka defeated Jenson Brooksby in the final, 7–6^{(7–5)}, 7–6^{(7–3)} to win the singles title at the 2022 Dallas Open. This was the first edition of the tournament.

The 24–22 second set tiebreak between Opelka and John Isner in the semifinals was the longest tiebreak in a tour-level match since the ATP Tour started in 1990.

== Seeds ==
The top four seeds received a bye into the second round.

1. (United States) Taylor Fritz (quarterfinals)
2. (United States) Reilly Opelka (champion)
3. (United States) John Isner (semifinals)
4. (United States) Jenson Brooksby (final)
5. (France) Adrian Mannarino (quarterfinals)
6. (United States) Maxime Cressy (first round)
7. (United States) Marcos Giron (semifinals)
8. (United States) Brandon Nakashima (second round)

== Draw ==
=== Key ===
- Q = Qualifier
- WC = Wild card
- LL = Lucky loser
- Alt = Alternate
- SE = Special exempt
- PR = Protected ranking
- ITF = ITF entry
- JE = Junior exempt
- w/o = Walkover
- r = Retired
- d = Defaulted
- SR = Special ranking

=== Finals ===
Semifinals
7	(United States) Marcos Giron	4	7^{7}	6^{5}
4	(United States) Jenson Brooksby	6	6^{4}	7^{7}
3	(United States) John Isner	6^{7}	6^{22}
2	(United States) Reilly Opelka	7^{9}	7^{24}

Final
4	(United States) Jenson Brooksby	6^{5}	6^{3}
2	(United States) Reilly Opelka	7^{7}	7^{7}

=== Top half ===
First round
(Germany) O Otte	4	4
WC	(United States) J Sock	6	6
Q	(United Kingdom) L Broady	6	6
(Germany) P Gojowczyk	1	4
(United States) T Sandgren	4	4
7	(United States) M Giron	6	6
(Germany) D Altmaier	6	3	4
(Italy) A Seppi	4	6	6
(Spain) F López	5	3
(Australia) J Thompson	7	6
(Australia) J Millman	5	6^{3}
8	(United States) B Nakashima	7	7^{7}

Second round
1	(United States) T Fritz	6	6
WC	(United States) J Sock	1	4
Q	(United Kingdom) L Broady	6	3	1
7	(United States) M Giron	3	6	6
4	(United States) J Brooksby	6	3	6
(Italy) A Seppi	3	6	3
(Australia) J Thompson	7	7^{7}
8	(United States) B Nakashima	5	6^{1}

Quarterfinals
1	(United States) T Fritz	4	6	6^{3}
7	(United States) M Giron	6	3	7^{7}
4	(United States) J Brooksby	6	6
(Australia) J Thompson	3	0

Semifinals
7	(United States) M Giron	4	7^{7}	6^{5}
4	(United States) J Brooksby	6	6^{4}	7^{7}

=== Bottom half ===
First round
6	(United States) M Cressy	6^{3}	6	1
Q	(Austria) J Rodionov	7^{7}	4	6
Q	(Canada) V Pospisil	6	6
WC	(United States) C Chakravarthi	1	0
(South Africa) K Anderson	6	6
(United States) S Querrey	4	4
5	(France) A Mannarino	6^{2}	6	7^{7}
(United States) S Johnson	7^{7}	2	6^{2}
WC	(United States) M Krueger	4	4
(Japan) Y Nishioka	6	6
Q	(Germany) C-M Stebe	7^{9}	3	6
(United States) D Kudla	6^{7}	6	3

Second round
Q	(Austria) J Rodionov	7^{7}	6^{6}	2
Q	(Canada) V Pospisil	6^{3}	7^{8}	6
(South Africa) K Anderson	6^{1}	7^{9}	6^{5}
3	(United States) J Isner	7^{7}	6^{7}	7^{7}
5	(France) A Mannarino	6	6
(Japan) Y Nishioka	3	1
Q	(Germany) C-M Stebe	6^{3}	6^{8}
2	(United States) R Opelka	7^{7}	7^{10}

Quarterfinals
Q	(Canada) V Pospisil	4	4
3	(United States) J Isner	6	6
5	(France) A Mannarino	3	4
2	(United States) R Opelka	6	6

Semifinals
3	(United States) J Isner	6^{7}	6^{22}
2	(United States) R Opelka	7^{9}	7^{24}

== Qualifying ==
=== Seeds ===
1. (Canada) Vasek Pospisil (qualified)
2. (United Kingdom) Liam Broady (qualified)
3. (Austria) Jurij Rodionov (qualified)
4. (United States) Ernesto Escobedo (first round)
5. (United States) Bjorn Fratangelo (first round)
6. (United States) Christopher Eubanks (qualifying competition)
7. (Chinese Taipei) Jason Jung (qualifying competition)
8. (Italy) Thomas Fabbiano (qualifying competition)

=== Qualifiers ===
1. (Canada) Vasek Pospisil
2. (United Kingdom) Liam Broady
3. (Austria) Jurij Rodionov
4. (Germany) Cedrik-Marcel Stebe

=== Qualifying draw ===
==== First qualifier ====
First round
1	(Canada) Vasek Pospisil	7	6
(Japan) Yasutaka Uchiyama	5	3
PR	(United States) J. J. Wolf	7^{7}	2	4
6	(United States) Christopher Eubanks	6^{5}	6	6

Qualifying competition
1	(Canada) Vasek Pospisil	6	7^{7}
6	(United States) Christopher Eubanks	3	6^{3}

==== Second qualifier ====
First round
2	(United Kingdom) Liam Broady	5	7^{8}	7^{11}
PR	(Uzbekistan) Denis Istomin	7	6^{6}	6^{9}
WC	(United States) Adam Neff	1	4
Alt/8	(Italy) Thomas Fabbiano	6	6

Qualifying competition
2	(United Kingdom) Liam Broady	6	6
Alt/8	(Italy) Thomas Fabbiano	2	3

==== Third qualifier ====
First round
3	(Austria) Jurij Rodionov	7^{7}	6
WC	(United States) Liam Krall	6^{1}	3
PR	(Japan) Go Soeda	6	1	6^{6}
7	(Chinese Taipei) Jason Jung	3	6	7^{8}

Qualifying competition
3	(Austria) Jurij Rodionov	4	6	6
7	(Chinese Taipei) Jason Jung	6	2	3

==== Fourth qualifier ====
First round
4	(United States) Ernesto Escobedo	4	7^{7}	6^{4}
Alt	(Japan) Yosuke Watanuki	6	6^{5}	7^{7}
PR	(Germany) Cedrik-Marcel Stebe	3	6	6
5	(United States) Bjorn Fratangelo	6	2	4

Qualifying competition
Alt	(Japan) Yosuke Watanuki	7^{7}	4	4
PR	(Germany) Cedrik-Marcel Stebe	6^{3}	6	6
