= 2023 Dallas Open – Doubles =

Doubles
- 2023 Dallas Open

Final
- Champions: (United Kingdom) Jamie Murray (New Zealand) Michael Venus
- Runners-up: (United States) Nathaniel Lammons (United States) Jackson Withrow
- Score: 1–6, 7–6^{(7–4)}, [10–7]

Events
Singles	Doubles
← 2022 ·	Dallas Open	· 2024 →

Jamie Murray and Michael Venus defeated Nathaniel Lammons and Jackson Withrow in the final, 1–6, 7–6^{(7–4)}, [10–7] to win the doubles tennis title at the 2023 Dallas Open.

Marcelo Arévalo and Jean-Julien Rojer were the reigning champions, but chose not to compete this year.

== Seeds ==
1. (United Kingdom) Jamie Murray / (New Zealand) Michael Venus (champions)
2. (United States) Nathaniel Lammons / (United States) Jackson Withrow (final)
3. (United Kingdom) Julian Cash / (United Kingdom) Henry Patten (quarterfinals)
4. (Sweden) André Göransson / (Japan) Ben McLachlan (semifinals)

== Draw ==
=== Key ===
- Q = Qualifier
- WC = Wild card
- LL = Lucky loser
- Alt = Alternate
- SE = Special exempt
- PR = Protected ranking
- ITF = ITF entry
- JE = Junior exempt
- w/o = Walkover
- r = Retired
- d = Defaulted
- SR = Special ranking

=== Draw ===
First round
1	(United Kingdom) J Murray (New Zealand) M Venus	6	6
(United Kingdom) J O'Mara (Australia) J-P Smith	2	3
WC	(United States) M Krueger (United States) T-S Kwiatkowski	6^{1}	3
(United States) W Blumberg (Serbia) M Kecmanović	7^{7}	6
4	(Sweden) A Göransson (Japan) B McLachlan	6	4	[10]
(Moldova) R Albot (Australia) J Thompson	3	6	[4]
(Serbia) I Sabanov (Serbia) M Sabanov	6	6^{2}	[10]
WC	(United States) P Kumar (United States) A Neff	3	7^{7}	[4]
(India) Y Bhambri (India) S Myneni	5	7^{7}	[10]
(United States) C Eubanks (United States) M Giron	7	6^{3}	[3]
I Ivashka (Germany) O Otte	2	1
3	(United Kingdom) J Cash (United Kingdom) H Patten	6	6
(Philippines) T Huey (Mexico) MÁ Reyes-Varela	6	7^{9}
(Ecuador) D Hidalgo (United States) H Reese	1	6^{7}
(Venezuela) LD Martínez (Colombia) C Rodríguez	7^{7}	3	[7]
2	(United States) N Lammons (United States) J Withrow	6^{5}	6	[10]

Quarterfinals
1	(United Kingdom) J Murray (New Zealand) M Venus	6^{4}	6	[10]
(United States) W Blumberg (Serbia) M Kecmanović	7^{7}	4	[5]
4	(Sweden) A Göransson (Japan) B McLachlan	3	6	[10]
(Serbia) I Sabanov (Serbia) M Sabanov	6	3	[4]
(India) Y Bhambri (India) S Myneni	2	6	[10]
3	(United Kingdom) J Cash (United Kingdom) H Patten	6	3	[8]
(Philippines) T Huey (Mexico) MÁ Reyes-Varela	3	2
2	(United States) N Lammons (United States) J Withrow	6	6

Semifinals
1	(United Kingdom) J Murray (New Zealand) M Venus	6	6
4	(Sweden) A Göransson (Japan) B McLachlan	3	2
(India) Y Bhambri (India) S Myneni	6^{11}	5
2	(United States) N Lammons (United States) J Withrow	7^{13}	7

Final
1	(United Kingdom) J Murray (New Zealand) M Venus	1	7^{7}	[10]
2	(United States) N Lammons (United States) J Withrow	6	6^{4}	[7]
