= 2023 Dallas Open – Singles =

Singles
- 2023 Dallas Open

Final
- Champion: (China) Wu Yibing
- Runner-up: (United States) John Isner
- Score: 6–7^{(4–7)}, 7–6^{(7–3)}, 7–6^{(14–12)}

Details
- Draw: 28 (4Q, 3WC)
- Seeds: 8

Events
Singles	Doubles
← 2022 ·	Dallas Open	· 2024 →

Wu Yibing defeated John Isner in the final, 6–7^{(4–7)}, 7–6^{(7–3)}, 7–6^{(14–12)} to win the singles tennis title at the 2023 Dallas Open. Wu became the first Chinese man in the Open Era to reach an ATP Tour singles final and win a title. He saved four championship points en route to the title.

Reilly Opelka was the reigning champion, but withdrew before the tournament, where he was replaced by Wu.

== Seeds ==
The top four seeds received a bye into the second round.

1. (United States) Taylor Fritz (semifinals)
2. (United States) Frances Tiafoe (quarterfinals)
3. (Canada) Denis Shapovalov (second round)
4. (Serbia) Miomir Kecmanović (second round)
5. (United States) John Isner (final)
6. (United States) J. J. Wolf (semifinals)
7. (United States) Marcos Giron (quarterfinals)
8. (France) Adrian Mannarino (quarterfinals)

== Draw ==
=== Key ===
- Q = Qualifier
- WC = Wild card
- LL = Lucky loser
- Alt = Alternate
- SE = Special exempt
- PR = Protected ranking
- ITF = ITF entry
- JE = Junior exempt
- w/o = Walkover
- r = Retired
- d = Defaulted
- SR = Special ranking

=== Finals ===
Semifinals
1	(United States) Taylor Fritz	7^{7}	5	4
(China) Wu Yibing	6^{3}	7	6
5	(United States) John Isner	3	7	7^{7}
6	(United States) J. J. Wolf	6	5	6^{4}

Final
(China) Wu Yibing	6^{4}	7^{7}	7^{14}
5	(United States) John Isner	7^{7}	6^{3}	6^{12}

=== Top half ===
First round
WC	(United States) J Sock	7^{7}	4	6
I Ivashka	6^{2}	6	4
(Germany) O Otte	6	4	6
(United States) C Eubanks	4	6	2
Q	(United States) A Rybakov	4	7^{7}	1
7	(United States) M Giron	6	6^{1}	6
(China) Y Wu	6	3	6
(United States) M Mmoh	3	6	3
(Australia) J Thompson	6	7
(United States) D Kudla	1	5
(United States) S Johnson	6^{6}	2
8	(France) A Mannarino	7^{8}	6

Second round
1	(United States) T Fritz	7^{7}	6
WC	(United States) J Sock	6^{5}	4
(Germany) O Otte	4	3
7	(United States) M Giron	6	6
3/WC	(Canada) D Shapovalov	6^{1}	4
(China) Y Wu	7^{7}	6
(Australia) J Thompson	2	6^{3}
8	(France) A Mannarino	6	7^{7}

Quarterfinals
1	(United States) T Fritz	7^{9}	3	6
7	(United States) M Giron	6^{7}	6	3
(China) Y Wu	6	6
8	(France) A Mannarino	3	4

Semifinals
1	(United States) T Fritz	7^{7}	5	4
(China) Y Wu	6^{3}	7	6

=== Bottom half ===
First round
5	(United States) J Isner	7^{7}	7^{7}
(Chinese Taipei) C-h Tseng	6^{5}	6^{1}
Q	(United States) Z Svajda	2	4
(Germany) D Altmaier	6	6
(Ecuador) E Gómez	6	6^{5}	7^{7}
LL	(Canada) G Diallo	4	7^{7}	6^{5}
6	(United States) JJ Wolf	6	6
Q	(United States) B Holt	3	3
(Moldova) R Albot	2	6	6
WC	(United States) L Krall	6	4	2
Q	(Spain) F Verdasco	3	0
(United States) M McDonald	6	6

Second round
5	(United States) J Isner	6	7^{7}
(Germany) D Altmaier	3	6^{1}
(Ecuador) E Gómez	2	7^{7}	6
4	(Serbia) M Kecmanović	6	6^{4}	4
6	(United States) JJ Wolf	6	7^{7}
(Moldova) R Albot	3	6^{5}
(United States) M McDonald	1	3
2	(United States) F Tiafoe	6	6

Quarterfinals
5	(United States) J Isner	7^{10}	7
(Ecuador) E Gómez	6^{8}	5
6	(United States) JJ Wolf	4	6	6
2	(United States) F Tiafoe	6	3	4

Semifinals
5	(United States) J Isner	3	7	7^{7}
6	(United States) JJ Wolf	6	5	6^{4}

== Qualifying ==
=== Seeds ===
1. (Spain) Fernando Verdasco (qualified)
2. (Australia) Aleksandar Vukic (first round)
3. (China) Shang Juncheng (first round)
4. (United States) Brandon Holt (qualified)
5. (Canada) Gabriel Diallo (qualifying competition, lucky loser)
6. (United States) Mitchell Krueger (qualifying competition)
7. (United States) Stefan Kozlov (qualifying competition)
8. (Czech Republic) Jonáš Forejtek (first round)

=== Qualifiers ===
1. (Spain) Fernando Verdasco
2. (United States) Zachary Svajda
3. (United States) Alex Rybakov
4. (United States) Brandon Holt

=== Lucky loser ===
1. (Canada) Gabriel Diallo

=== Qualifying draw ===
==== First qualifier ====
First round
1	(Spain) Fernando Verdasco	3	6	7^{7}
(United States) Evan Zhu	6	4	6^{5}
Alt	(United Kingdom) Jack Pinnington Jones	4	3
6	(United States) Mitchell Krueger	6	6

Qualifying competition
1	(Spain) Fernando Verdasco	6	7
6	(United States) Mitchell Krueger	4	5

==== Second qualifier ====
First round
2	(Australia) Aleksandar Vukic	5	3
(United States) Zachary Svajda	7	6
PR	(United States) Thai-Son Kwiatkowski	3	4
7	(United States) Stefan Kozlov	6	6

Qualifying competition
(United States) Zachary Svajda	6	6
7	(United States) Stefan Kozlov	3	4

==== Third qualifier ====
First round
3	(China) Shang Juncheng	7^{7}	6^{3}	1
(Germany) Elmar Ejupovic	6^{5}	7^{7}	6
Alt	(United States) Alex Rybakov	6	6
8	(Czech Republic) Jonáš Forejtek	4	4

Qualifying competition
(Germany) Elmar Ejupovic	5	3
Alt	(United States) Alex Rybakov	7	6

==== Fourth qualifier ====
First round
4	(United States) Brandon Holt	6	6
WC	(United States) Nick Chappell	3	2
WC	(Spain) Antonio Muñiz Hidalgo	4	3
5	(Canada) Gabriel Diallo	6	6

Qualifying competition
4	(United States) Brandon Holt	7^{10}	7^{7}
5	(Canada) Gabriel Diallo	6^{8}	6^{5}
