= 2022 Dallas Open =

ATP tennis tournament

- Date: 7–13 February 2022
- Edition: 1st
- Category: ATP Tour 250
- Draw: 28S / 16D
- Prize money: $792,980
- Surface: Hard (indoor)
- Location: Dallas, United States
- Venue: Styslinger/Altec Tennis Complex

Champions

Singles
- (United States) Reilly Opelka

Doubles
- (El Salvador) Marcelo Arévalo / (Netherlands) Jean-Julien Rojer
Dallas Open	· 2023 →

The 2022 Dallas Open was a men's tennis tournament played on indoor hard courts. It was the inaugural edition of the Dallas Open, and part of the ATP Tour 250 series on the 2022 ATP Tour. It took place at the Styslinger/Altec Tennis Complex in the city of Dallas, United States, between 7 and 13 February 2022. The ATP Tour returned to Dallas for the first time in almost 40 years, with this tournament replacing the New York Open. Second-seeded Reilly Opelka won the singles title.

== Champions ==
=== Singles ===
- (United States) Reilly Opelka def. (United States) Jenson Brooksby, 7–6^{(7–5)}, 7–6^{(7–3)}

=== Doubles ===
- (El Salvador) Marcelo Arévalo / (Netherlands) Jean-Julien Rojer def. (United Kingdom) Lloyd Glasspool / (Finland) Harri Heliövaara, 7–6^{(7–4)}, 6–4

== Points and prize money ==
=== Point distribution ===
Event	W	F	SF	QF	Round of 16	Round of 32	Q	Q2	Q1
Singles	250	150	90	45	20	0	12	6	0
Doubles	250	150	90	45	0	—	—	—	—

=== Prize money ===
Event	W	F	SF	QF	Round of 16	Round of 32	Q2	Q1
Singles	$107,770	$62,865	$36,960	$21,415	$12,435	$7,600	$3,800	$2,070
Doubles*	$37,440	$20,040	$11,740	$6,560	$3,870	—	—	—

_{*per team}

== Singles main draw entrants ==
=== Seeds ===
Country	Player	Ranking^{1}	Seed
USA	Taylor Fritz	20	1
USA	Reilly Opelka	24	2
USA	John Isner	28	3
USA	Jenson Brooksby	57	4
FRA	Adrian Mannarino	58	5
USA	Maxime Cressy	59	6
USA	Marcos Giron	70	7
USA	Brandon Nakashima	71	8

- ^{1} Rankings are as of 31 January 2022.

=== Other entrants ===
The following players received wildcards into the main draw:

- (United States) Caleb Chakravarthi
- (United States) Mitchell Krueger
- (United States) Jack Sock

The following players received entry from the qualifying draw:

- (United Kingdom) Liam Broady
- (Canada) Vasek Pospisil
- (Austria) Jurij Rodionov
- (Germany) Cedrik-Marcel Stebe

=== Withdrawals ===
Before the tournament

- (Bulgaria) Grigor Dimitrov → replaced by (Spain) Feliciano López
- (Australia) James Duckworth → replaced by (Japan) Yoshihito Nishioka
- (Japan) Kei Nishikori → replaced by (Germany) Oscar Otte
- (United States) Tommy Paul → replaced by (South Africa) Kevin Anderson

== Doubles main draw entrants ==
=== Seeds ===
Country	Player	Country	Player	Rank^{1}	Seed
ESA	Marcelo Arévalo	NED	Jean-Julien Rojer	66	1
USA	Austin Krajicek	MON	Hugo Nys	96	2
KAZ	Aleksandr Nedovyesov	PAK	Aisam-ul-Haq Qureshi	109	3
AUS	Luke Saville	AUS	John-Patrick Smith	122	4

- ^{1} Rankings as of 31 January 2022.

=== Other entrants ===
The following pairs received wildcards into the doubles main draw:

- (United States) John Isner / (United States) Jack Sock
- (United States) Adam Neff / (United States) Ivan Thamma

=== Withdrawals ===
Before the tournament

- (Bulgaria) Grigor Dimitrov / (United States) John Isner → replaced by (Mexico) Hans Hach Verdugo / (Mexico) Miguel Ángel Reyes-Varela
- (United States) Nicholas Monroe / (United States) Tommy Paul → replaced by (United States) Denis Kudla / (Canada) Brayden Schnur
- (Poland) Szymon Walków / (Poland) Jan Zieliński → replaced by (United States) Evan King / (United States) Alex Lawson
