= 2024 Dallas Open – Singles =

Singles
- 2024 Dallas Open

Final
- Champion: (United States) Tommy Paul
- Runner-up: (United States) Marcos Giron
- Score: 7–6^{(7–3)}, 5–7, 6–3

Details
- Draw: 28 (4Q, 3WC)
- Seeds: 8

Events
Singles	Doubles
← 2023 ·	Dallas Open	· 2025 →

Tommy Paul defeated Marcos Giron in the final, 7–6^{(7–3)}, 5–7, 6–3 to win the singles tennis title at the 2024 Dallas Open. It was his second ATP Tour title.

Wu Yibing was the reigning champion, but did not participate this year.

== Seeds ==
The top four seeds received a bye into the second round.

1. (United States) Frances Tiafoe (quarterfinals)
2. (United States) Tommy Paul (champion)
3. (United States) Ben Shelton (semifinals)
4. (France) Adrian Mannarino (semifinals)
5. (United States) Christopher Eubanks (second round)
6. (Australia) Max Purcell (second round)
7. (Australia) Jordan Thompson (quarterfinals)
8. (Germany) Dominik Koepfer (quarterfinals)

== Draw ==
=== Key ===
- Q = Qualifier
- WC = Wild card
- LL = Lucky loser
- Alt = Alternate
- ITF = ITF entry
- PR = Protected ranking
- SR = Special ranking
- SE = Special exempt
- JE = Junior exempt
- JR = Junior Accelerator Programme entrant
- CO = College Accelerator Programme entrant
- NG = Next Gen Accelerator Program entrant
- w/o = Walkover
- r = Retired
- d = Defaulted

=== Finals ===
Semifinals
(United States) Marcos Giron	6	6
4	(France) Adrian Mannarino	1	3
3	(United States) Ben Shelton	2	4
2	(United States) Tommy Paul	6	6

Final
(United States) Marcos Giron	6^{3}	7	3
2	(United States) Tommy Paul	7^{7}	5	6

=== Top half ===
First round
Q	(United States) T Sandgren	3	6	1
(United States) A Michelsen	6	3	6
Q	(United States) N Moreno de Alboran	1	4
(United States) M Giron	6	6
WC	(United States) M Krueger	2	6	6^{3}
6	(Australia) M Purcell	6	4	7^{7}
LL	(France) T Atmane	6^{5}	6	3
(Japan) Y Nishioka	7^{7}	4	6
(Australia) J Duckworth	7^{7}	6
(United States) Z Svajda	6^{3}	1
Q	(United States) S Johnson	1	4
5	(United States) C Eubanks	6	6

Second round
1	(United States) F Tiafoe	6	6
(United States) A Michelsen	4	3
(United States) M Giron	6	6
6	(Australia) M Purcell	4	3
4	(France) A Mannarino	w/o
(Japan) Y Nishioka
(Australia) J Duckworth	7^{7}	6
5	(United States) C Eubanks	6^{3}	4

Quarterfinals
1	(United States) F Tiafoe	1	4
(United States) M Giron	6	6
4	(France) A Mannarino	6	3
(Australia) J Duckworth	2	1^{r}

Semifinals
(United States) M Giron	6	6
4	(France) A Mannarino	1	3

=== Bottom half ===
First round
7	(Australia) J Thompson	6	6
WC	(United States) A Neff	3	1
LL	(United States) D Kudla	6	7^{7}
(Moldova) R Albot	3	6^{3}
Q	(United States) E Nava	5	2
(United States) M Mmoh	7	6
8	(Germany) D Koepfer	6	7^{7}
(United States) A Kovacevic	4	6^{5}
WC	(United States) E Quinn	4	4
(Australia) R Hijikata	6	6
(Japan) T Daniel	4	6	5
(France) C Lestienne	6	4	0^{r}

Second round
7	(Australia) J Thompson	6	6
LL	(United States) D Kudla	1	1
(United States) M Mmoh	3	3
3	(United States) B Shelton	6	6
8	(Germany) D Koepfer	6	7^{7}
(Australia) R Hijikata	3	6^{5}
(Japan) T Daniel	3	2
2	(United States) T Paul	6	6

Quarterfinals
7	(Australia) J Thompson	7^{7}	4	4
3	(United States) B Shelton	6^{2}	6	6
8	(Germany) D Koepfer	5	3
2	(United States) T Paul	7	6

Semifinals
3	(United States) B Shelton	2	4
2	(United States) T Paul	6	6

== Qualifying ==
=== Seeds ===
1. (France) Térence Atmane (qualifying competition, lucky loser)
2. (United States) Emilio Nava (qualified)
3. (United States) Nicolas Moreno de Alboran (qualified)
4. (Japan) Sho Shimabukuro (first round)
5. (United States) Denis Kudla (qualifying competition, lucky loser)
6. (Ukraine) Illya Marchenko (qualifying competition)
7. (Argentina) Marco Trungelliti (qualifying competition)
8. (United States) Steve Johnson (qualified)

=== Qualifiers ===
1. (United States) Steve Johnson
2. (United States) Emilio Nava
3. (United States) Nicolas Moreno de Alboran
4. (United States) Tennys Sandgren

=== Lucky losers ===
1. (United States) Denis Kudla
2. (France) Térence Atmane

=== Qualifying draw ===
==== First qualifier ====
First round
1	(France) Térence Atmane	4	7^{7}	6
Alt	(United States) Thai-Son Kwiatkowski	6	6^{2}	2
Alt	(Germany) Timo Stodder	4	2
8	(United States) Steve Johnson	6	6

Qualifying competition
1	(France) Térence Atmane	3	7^{7}	4
8	(United States) Steve Johnson	6	6^{4}	6

==== Second qualifier ====
First round
2	(United States) Emilio Nava	6	6
(United States) Aidan Mayo	3	4
(Argentina) Juan Pablo Ficovich	6^{4}	7^{7}	4
7	(Argentina) Marco Trungelliti	7^{7}	6^{4}	6

Qualifying competition
2	(United States) Emilio Nava	6	4	6
7	(Argentina) Marco Trungelliti	3	6	4

==== Third qualifier ====
First round
3	(United States) Nicolas Moreno de Alboran	6	7^{7}
WC	(United States) Trevor Svajda	3	6^{2}
WC	(United States) Jerry Barton	2	5
5	(United States) Denis Kudla	6	7

Qualifying competition
3	(United States) Nicolas Moreno de Alboran	6	6^{4}	6
5	(United States) Denis Kudla	4	7^{7}	4

==== Fourth qualifier ====
First round
4	(Japan) Sho Shimabukuro	2	6^{2}
(United States) Tennys Sandgren	6	7^{7}
(United States) Brandon Holt	6^{3}	7^{7}	6^{1}
6	(Ukraine) Illya Marchenko	7^{7}	6^{4}	7^{7}

Qualifying competition
(United States) Tennys Sandgren	7	7^{7}
6	(Ukraine) Illya Marchenko	5	6^{5}
