= 2024 Dallas Open =

- Date: 5–11 February 2024
- Edition: 3rd
- Category: ATP Tour 250
- Draw: 28S / 16D
- Prize money: $756,020
- Surface: Hard (indoor)
- Location: Dallas, United States
- Venue: Styslinger/Altec Tennis Complex

Champions

Singles
- (United States) Tommy Paul

Doubles
- (Australia) Max Purcell / (New Zealand) Jordan Thompson
- Dallas Open

The 2024 Dallas Open was a men's tennis tournament played on indoor hard courts. It was the 3rd edition of the Dallas Open, and part of the ATP Tour 250 series on the 2024 ATP Tour. It took place at the Styslinger/Altec Tennis Complex in the city of Dallas, United States, between February 5–11, 2024.

== Finals ==
=== Singles ===
- (United States) Tommy Paul def. (United States) Marcos Giron, 7–6^{(7–3)}, 5–7, 6–3

=== Doubles ===
- (Australia) Max Purcell / (Australia) Jordan Thompson def. (United States) William Blumberg / (Australia) Rinky Hijikata, 6–4, 2–6, [10–8]

== Singles main draw entrants ==
=== Seeds ===
Country	Player	Ranking^{1}	Seed
USA	Frances Tiafoe	14	1
USA	Tommy Paul	15	2
USA	Ben Shelton	16	3
FRA	Adrian Mannarino	17	4
USA	Christopher Eubanks	32	5
AUS	Max Purcell	43	6
AUS	Jordan Thompson	44	7
GER	Dominik Koepfer	60	8

- ^{1} Rankings are as of 29 January 2024.

=== Other entrants ===
The following players received wildcards into the main draw:

- (United States) Mitchell Krueger
- (United States) Adam Neff
- (United States) Ethan Quinn

The following players received entry from the qualifying draw:

- (United States) Steve Johnson
- (United States) Nicolas Moreno de Alboran
- (United States) Emilio Nava
- (United States) Tennys Sandgren

The following players received entry as lucky losers:

- (France) Térence Atmane
- (United States) Denis Kudla

=== Withdrawals ===
- (Serbia) Miomir Kecmanović → replaced by (France) Térence Atmane
- (United States) Mackenzie McDonald → replaced by (United States) Denis Kudla
- (United States) J. J. Wolf → replaced by (Australia) James Duckworth

== Doubles main draw entrants ==
=== Seeds ===
Country	Player	Country	Player	Rank^{1}	Seed
MEX	Santiago González	GBR	Neal Skupski	17	1
USA	Nathaniel Lammons	USA	Jackson Withrow	43	2
GBR	Julian Cash	USA	Robert Galloway	99	3
AUS	Max Purcell	AUS	Jordan Thompson	119	4

- ^{1} Rankings as of 29 January 2024.

=== Other entrants ===
The following pairs received wildcards into the doubles main draw:

- (United States) Huntley Allen / (United States) Julian Noah Steinhausen
- (United States) Emilio Nava / (United States) Ben Shelton

=== Withdrawals ===
- (Ecuador) Gonzalo Escobar / (Kazakhstan) Aleksandr Nedovyesov → replaced by (Ecuador) Gonzalo Escobar / (Tunisia) Skander Mansouri
