= Ivan Thamma =

American tennis player

- Country (sports): United States
- Born: January 30, 1999 (age 27) San Diego, California, United States
- College: UC Davis; SMU
- Prize money: $54

Singles
- Career record: 0–0 (at ATP Tour level, Grand Slam level, and in Davis Cup)
- Career titles: 0

Doubles
- Career record: 0–1 (at ATP Tour level, Grand Slam level, and in Davis Cup)
- Career titles: 0
- Last updated on: February 7, 2022.

Ivan Thamma (born January 30, 1999) is an American tennis player.

Thamma made his ATP main draw debut at the 2022 Dallas Open after receiving a wildcard into the doubles main draw with Adam Neff.

Thamma played college tennis at UC Davis before grad-transferring to SMU.
