= Caleb Chakravarthi =

American tennis player

- Country (sports): United States
- Born: January 2, 1999 (age 27) Irvine, California, United States
- Height: 1.88 m (6 ft 2 in)
- Plays: Right-handed (two-handed backhand)
- College: Illinois; SMU
- Prize money: $590

Singles
- Career record: 0–1 (at ATP Tour level, Grand Slam level, and in Davis Cup)
- Career titles: 0

Doubles
- Career record: 0–0 (at ATP Tour level, Grand Slam level, and in Davis Cup)
- Career titles: 0
- Last updated on: February 7, 2022.

Caleb Chakravarthi (born January 2, 1999) is an American tennis player. Chakravathi played college tennis at Illinois before transferring to SMU.

== Career ==
Chakravarthi made his ATP main draw debut at the 2022 Dallas Open after entering into the singles main draw as a wildcard.
