= 2024 Dallas Open – Doubles =

Doubles
- 2024 Dallas Open

Final
- Champions: (Australia) Max Purcell (Australia) Jordan Thompson
- Runners-up: (United States) William Blumberg (Australia) Rinky Hijikata
- Score: 6–4, 2–6, [10–8]

Events
Singles	Doubles
- Dallas Open

Max Purcell and Jordan Thompson defeated William Blumberg and Rinky Hijikata in the final, 6–4, 2–6, [10–8] to win the doubles tennis title at the 2024 Dallas Open.

Jamie Murray and Michael Venus were the reigning champions, but Murray chose not to participate this year and Venus chose to compete in Marseille instead.

== Seeds ==
1. (Mexico) Santiago González / (United Kingdom) Neal Skupski (semifinals)
2. (United States) Nathaniel Lammons / (United States) Jackson Withrow (first round)
3. (United Kingdom) Julian Cash / (United States) Robert Galloway (first round)
4. (Australia) Max Purcell / (Australia) Jordan Thompson (champions)

== Draw ==
Key

- Q = Qualifier
- WC = Wild card
- LL = Lucky loser
- Alt = Alternate
- ITF = ITF entry
- PR = Protected ranking
- SR = Special ranking
- SE = Special exempt
- JE = Junior exempt
- JR = Junior Accelerator Programme entrant
- CO = College Accelerator Programme entrant
- NG = Next Gen Accelerator Program entrant
- w/o = Walkover
- r = Retired
- d = Defaulted

=== Draw ===
First round
1	(Mexico) S González (United Kingdom) N Skupski	6	7^{7}
(United States) E King (United States) R Stalder	3	6^{4}
(Ecuador) G Escobar (Tunisia) S Mansouri	7^{7}	6
(Brazil) M Demoliner (Sweden) A Göransson	6^{3}	4
4	(Australia) M Purcell (Australia) J Thompson	7^{8}	6
(Australia) A Harris (Germany) D Koepfer	6^{6}	3
(Venezuela) LD Martínez (Mexico) MÁ Reyes-Varela	6^{4}	6	[10]
(Ecuador) D Hidalgo (Colombia) C Rodríguez	7^{7}	3	[5]
(Portugal) F Cabral (United Kingdom) H Patten	6	6
(Australia) J Duckworth (United States) A Michelsen	3	2
(United States) W Blumberg (Australia) R Hijikata	3	6	[10]
3	(United Kingdom) J Cash (United States) R Galloway	6	3	[7]
WC	(United States) H Allen (United States) JN Steinhausen	4	7^{8}	[8]
WC	(United States) E Nava (United States) B Shelton	6	6^{6}	[10]
(India) A Chandrasekar (India) VS Prashanth	6	7^{7}
2	(United States) N Lammons (United States) J Withrow	4	6^{2}

Quarterfinals
1	(Mexico) S González (United Kingdom) N Skupski	7	7^{7}
(Ecuador) G Escobar (Tunisia) S Mansouri	5	6^{4}
4	(Australia) M Purcell (Australia) J Thompson	6	6
(Venezuela) LD Martínez (Mexico) MÁ Reyes-Varela	1	3
(Portugal) F Cabral (United Kingdom) H Patten	6	3	[8]
(United States) W Blumberg (Australia) R Hijikata	3	6	[10]
WC	(United States) E Nava (United States) B Shelton	7^{7}	4	[12]
(India) A Chandrasekar (India) VS Prashanth	6^{5}	6	[10]

Semifinals
1	(Mexico) S González (United Kingdom) N Skupski	6^{4}	3
4	(Australia) M Purcell (Australia) J Thompson	7^{7}	6
(United States) W Blumberg (Australia) R Hijikata	6	6
WC	(United States) E Nava (United States) B Shelton	4	4

Final
4	(Australia) M Purcell (Australia) J Thompson	6	2	[10]
(United States) W Blumberg (Australia) R Hijikata	4	6	[8]
