= Taylor Fritz =

American tennis player (born 1997)

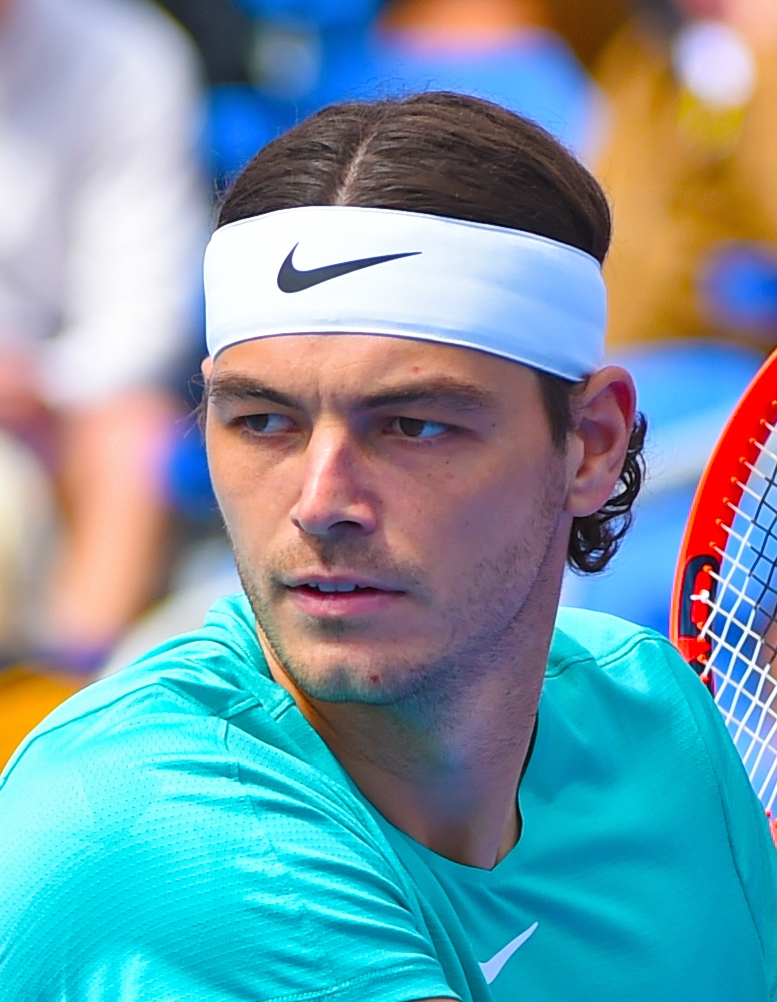
- Fritz at the 2024 Delray Beach Open
- Full name: Taylor Harry Fritz
- Country (sports): United States
- Residence: Rancho Palos Verdes, California, US
- Born: 28 October 1997 (age 29) Rancho Santa Fe, California, US
- Height: 6 ft 5 in (1.96 m)
- Turned pro: 2015
- Plays: Right-handed (two handed-backhand)
- Coach: Michael Russell, Paul Annacone
- Prize money: US$34,296,674: 15th all-time in earnings

Singles
- Career record: 383–235 (62.0%) (Note: In ATP Tour and Grand Slam main draw matches, Summer Olympics, Davis Cup and Laver Cup)
- Career titles: 12
- Highest ranking: No. 4 (November 18, 2024)
- Current ranking: No. 9 (November 16, 2026)

Grand Slam singles results
- Australian Open: QF (2024)
- French Open: 4R (2024)
- Wimbledon: SF (2025)
- US Open: F (2024)

Other tournaments
- Tour Finals: F (2024)
- Olympic Games: 3R (2024)

Doubles
- Career record: 57–63
- Career titles: 0
- Highest ranking: No. 104 (July 26, 2021)

Grand Slam doubles results
- Australian Open: 2R (2019)
- French Open: 1R (2018, 2021)
- Wimbledon: 2R (2018)
- US Open: 2R (2016, 2017)

Other doubles tournaments
- Olympic Games: Bronze (2024)

Grand Slam mixed doubles results
- US Open: 1R (2014, 2015, 2025, 2026)

Other mixed doubles tournaments
- Olympic Games: QF (2024)

Team competitions
- Davis Cup: QF (2022, 2024)
Olympic medal record
Men's tennis
Representing United States
Olympic Games
Bronze medal – third place	2024 Paris	Doubles
- Last updated on: November 16, 2026.

Taylor Harry Fritz (born October 28, 1997) is an American professional tennis player. He has been ranked by the Association of Tennis Professionals (ATP) as high as world No. 4 in singles, attained in November 2024, and No. 104 in doubles, attained in July 2021. He is the current No. 3 American singles player.

Fritz has won twelve ATP Tour singles titles, including an ATP Masters 1000 title at the 2022 Indian Wells Open, and was runner-up at the 2024 US Open and at the 2024 ATP Finals. He also won a bronze medal at the 2024 Paris Olympics in men's doubles, partnering Tommy Paul.

== Early life and background ==
Fritz was born the youngest of three boys to Kathy May, a former top-10 WTA player, and Guy Henry Fritz, who also played professional tennis and was named US Olympic Development Coach of the Year 2016. They divorced when he was 18. Through his mother, Fritz is the great-great-grandson of David May, founder of The May Department Stores Company, which merged with Macy's and first cousins with American real estate executive and civic official Brian Rosenstein.

Fritz has two older maternal half-brothers, Chris and Kyle. His uncle, Harry Fritz, also played professional tennis and competed in, and won, the longest Davis Cup match of all time (by number of games). His aunt, Laura Fritz, was a competitive swimmer reaching a top-5 in the world ranking in the 100 freestyle as well as a member of the world record relay team in the 400 X4 freestyle.

Fritz grew up with his brothers in Rancho Santa Fe in the San Diego metropolitan area. He attended Torrey Pines High School, where he won the CIF singles title in the San Diego section as a freshman. A few months into his sophomore year, he switched to Laurel Springs School, an online high school to play full-time ITF junior events.

== Junior career ==
Fritz did not play any ITF Junior events until he was 15, when he competed in a low-level Grade-4 tournament in March 2013 in Clairemont near where he grew up. He would not play another event until the 2013 Junior US Open, at which point he began to compete regularly on the ITF Circuit shortly before turning 16. Within the next year, he made it to the semifinals at the 2014 Junior Wimbledon tournament. He then won his first Grade A tournament at the 2014 Osaka Mayor's Cup.

In 2015, Fritz reached at least the quarterfinal of all four junior Grand Slam tournaments – the first final at the French Open in June, where he lost to compatriot Tommy Paul. In September, he reached another major jr. final at the US Open. This time, he avenged his loss in France by defeating Paul. This major success helped him finish the year as the boys' No. 1 player, for which he was named the 2015 ITF Junior World Champion. He was the first American to hold this title since Donald Young in 2005 and Andy Roddick in 2000.

== Professional career ==
=== 2015: ATP debut ===
Fritz played his first ATP Tour tournament at Nottingham, where he received a wild card and won his first ATP match against Pablo Carreño Busta.

In September 2015, Fritz turned pro after winning the Junior US Open. He quickly rose from the 600s into the top 250 of the ATP rankings by becoming the 9th player at age 17 to win multiple Challenger Tour titles – doing so in back-to-back weeks. The others to accomplish that feat include Top 20 players Bernard Tomic, Tomáš Berdych, Richard Gasquet, and Juan Martín del Potro as well as Number 1 overall players Rafael Nadal and Novak Djokovic.

=== 2016: Top 100 debut and ATP Tour final ===
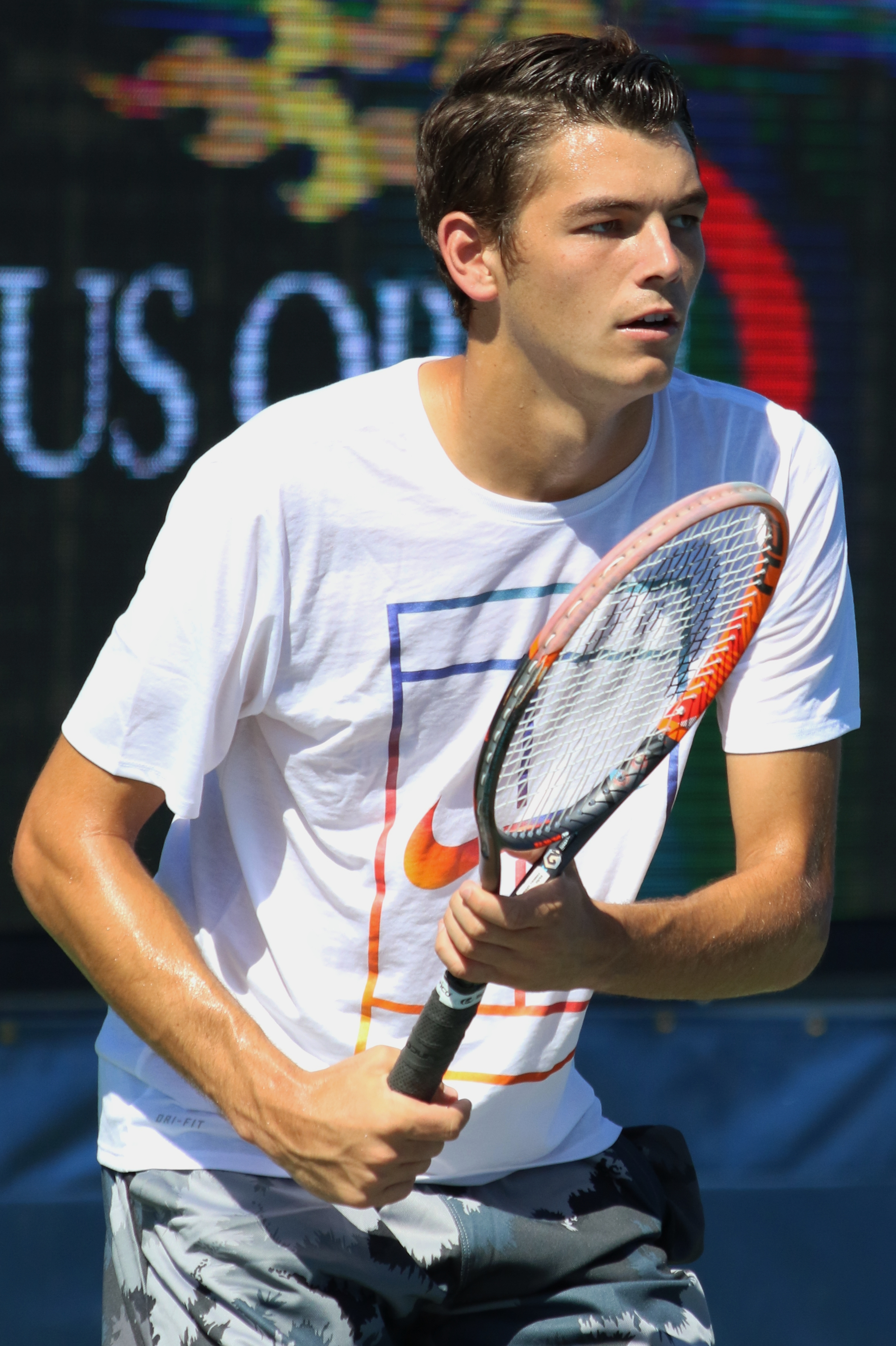
Fritz at the 2016 US Open

After he lost in the final of his last tournament of 2015, Fritz reached a final again in his first tournament of 2016, this time winning against top-100 player Dudi Sela at Happy Valley to catapult to a ranking in the 150s. In the following week, he made it through Australian Open Qualifying to reach his first main draw of a Grand Slam tournament at the Australian Open, where he would lose in the 1st round to fellow American Jack Sock in five sets.

Fritz was awarded a wildcard into his first ATP 250 tournament of 2016 at Memphis and knocked off the second-seeded Steve Johnson, who at No. 29 was the highest ranked player Fritz had ever defeated. With his victory over Ričardas Berankis in the semifinal, he became the youngest American to reach an ATP final since Michael Chang in 1988, and also the second-fastest American ever to reach an ATP final, doing so in just his third career ATP tournament. John Isner is the only American that was able to reach an ATP final faster. Fritz would lose in the final to three-time defending champion and top-10 player Kei Nishikori. In February, Fritz cracked the top 100 by reaching the quarterfinals in Acapulco at his first career ATP 500 event.

Fritz's grass-court season was highlighted by a close three-set loss to Roger Federer at Stuttgart. He would end up peaking in the rankings at No. 53 towards the end of the summer. At the US Open, Fritz drew Jack Sock in the first round of a major for the second time this year, again losing in five sets.

To cap off the year, Fritz won the ATP Star of Tomorrow for being the youngest player in the top 100, having just turned 19.

=== 2017: First major win ===
Fritz was able to achieve his first victory over a top-10 ATP player at Indian Wells, defeating sixth seed Marin Čilić in the second round. Fritz struggled through the first half of the year with injury problems and ended up skipping the clay court season to focus on recovering. He returned to form in the summer with quarterfinals at Los Cabos and Winston-Salem. In his seventh grand slam appearance, Fritz won his first match at a major tournament by knocking out Marcos Baghdatis at the US Open before losing in the second round to Dominic Thiem.

=== 2018: Top 50 debut ===
After finishing 2017 just outside the top 100, Fritz had a good start to the 2018 season, reaching two Challenger finals in January. He returned to the Top 100 of the ATP rankings by reaching the final in New Caledonia, though he lost there to Noah Rubin. Following a loss in qualifying at the Australian Open, he then won his first Challenger title in two years at the inaugural event in Newport Beach, not too far from his current residence in Palos Verdes.

He continued his strong start by making it to the fourth round at Indian Wells, his first round of 16-appearance at a Masters event.

Fritz kicked off the clay-court season with a semifinals appearance at the US Men's Clay Court Championships in Houston, the best result on clay of his career thus far. In the tournament, he upset Ryan Harrison and Jack Sock before losing to Steve Johnson. This helped him get back to No. 66 in the world.

At the US Open, Fritz reached his first Grand Slam third round, defeating Mischa Zverev and Jason Kubler, before losing to 9th-seeded Dominic Thiem in four sets.

Earlier in the season, Fritz began working with Paul Annacone, who helped him reach a career-high ranking of world No. 47 on November 5, 2018.

=== 2019: Top 25, first ATP title ===
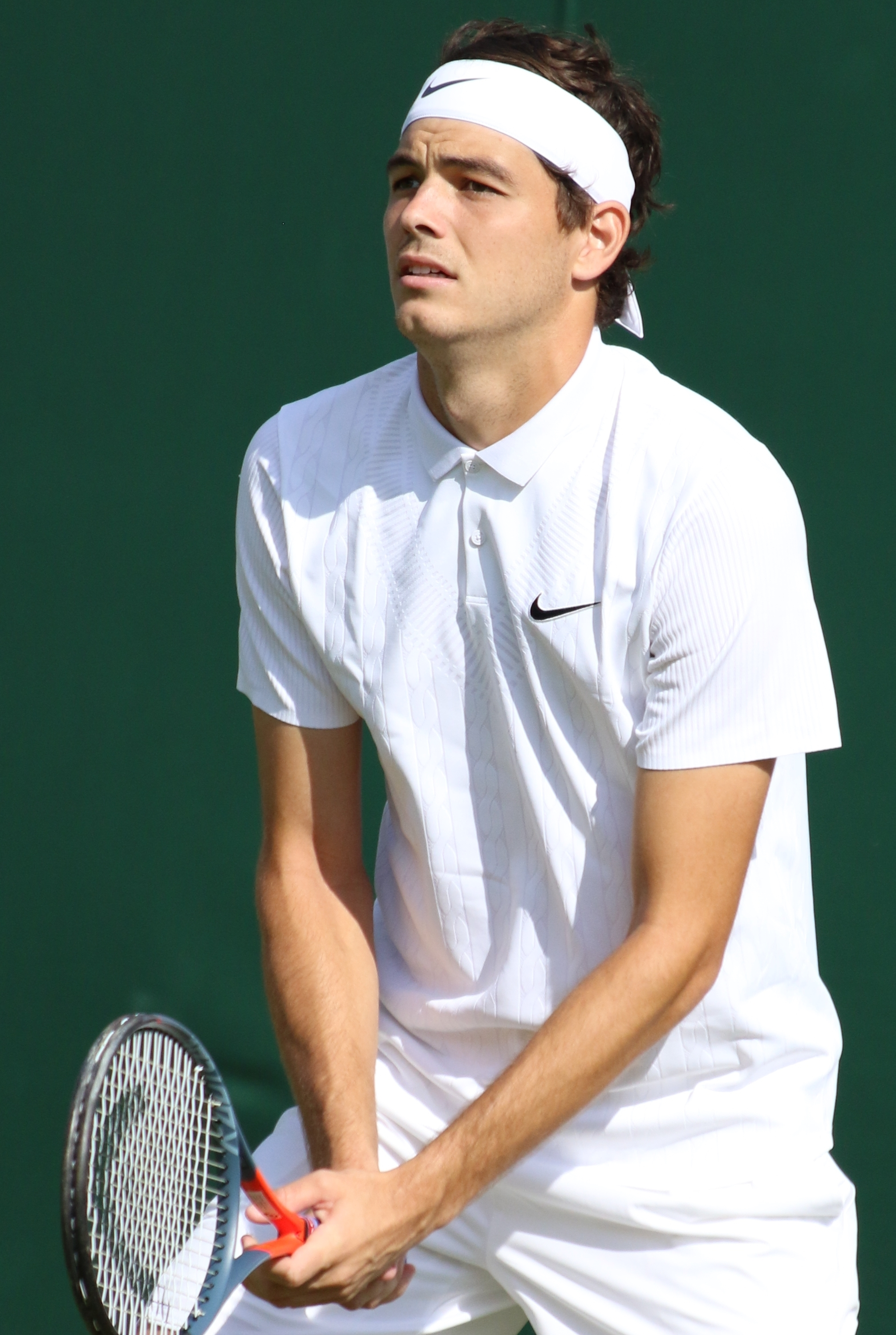
Fritz at the 2019 Wimbledon Championships

Fritz made the third round at the Australian Open, losing to Roger Federer in 3 sets. Fritz then went on to win the Challenger at Newport Beach, California; he defeated Brayden Schnur of Canada in the final, in straight sets. In June, Fritz won his first ATP Tour title at the Eastbourne International by defeating Sam Querrey in straight sets. In the first round of Wimbledon, Fritz defeated Tomáš Berdych in straight sets, before losing to Jan-Lennard Struff in four sets. At the US Open, Fritz was seeded 26th, his first-ever Grand Slam seeding. However, in the first round, he lost to Feliciano López.

Fritz represented Team World in the third annual Laver Cup, held in Geneva. In his first singles match, he lost to Stefanos Tsitsipas. Fritz bounced back on the final day of play in defeating Dominic Thiem. At the Swiss Indoors, Fritz defeated 2nd-seeded Alexander Zverev in the first round in straight sets. After achieving a career-high ranking of world No. 25 on August 5, 2019, Fritz ended the year ranked No. 32 in the world.

=== 2020: First ATP 500 final ===
Fritz began his season at the inaugural 2020 ATP Cup, representing Team USA. He went 1–2 in the singles competition, as Team USA was sent out of the tournament in the round-robin stage.

At the Australian Open, Fritz reached the third round, posting a five-set victory over Kevin Anderson. He was then defeated by eventual finalist Dominic Thiem.

Fritz reached his first ATP 500 final in Acapulco, where he lost to Rafael Nadal. However, his runner-up showing propelled him to a new career-high ranking of world No. 24 on March 2, 2020.

At the US Open, Fritz was seeded 19th. He defeated Dominik Koepfer in four sets and then beat Gilles Simon in the second round before losing to Denis Shapovalov in the third round in five sets.

At the French Open, Fritz was seeded 27th. He defeated Tomáš Macháč in five sets and Radu Albot in straight sets before losing to Lorenzo Sonego in the third round in straight sets. The match against Sonego had the longest tie-break in French Open history, with Fritz losing the tie-break 17–19.

=== 2021: Indian Wells semifinal, American No. 1 ===
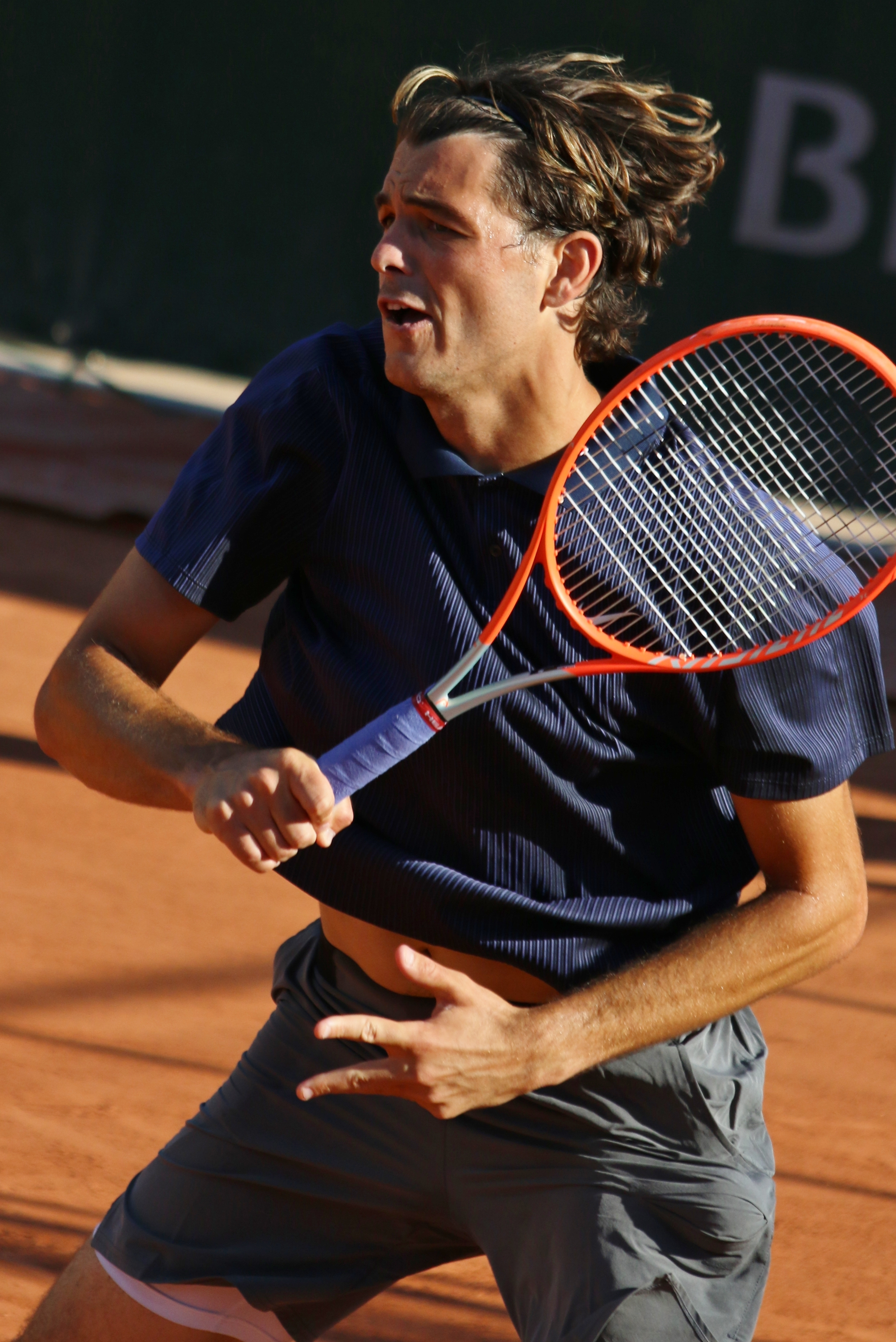
Fritz at the 2021 French Open

Fritz started his 2021 season at the first edition of the Murray River Open. Seeded sixth, he made it to the third round, where he lost to Jérémy Chardy. Seeded 27th at the Australian Open, he reached the third round where he was defeated by top seed, eight-time champion, and eventual champion, Novak Djokovic, in five sets, despite coming back from two sets to love down.

In Doha, Fritz reached the semifinals beating Lorenzo Sonego, sixth seed David Goffin, and fourth seed Denis Shapovalov. He ended up losing in the semifinals to Nikoloz Basilashvili. Seeded 15th at the Dubai Championships, he got revenge on Basilashvili, defeating him in the second round in three sets. He was beaten in the third round by second seed Andrey Rublev. Seeded 22nd at the Miami Open, he reached the fourth round where he lost to 32nd seed Alexander Bublik. Despite this loss, this was his best showing at this Masters 1000 event and only his second fourth round in a Masters 1000 tournament in his career.

Fritz dropped again out of the top 30 on May 10, 2021, following first-round losses at Monte-Carlo and Madrid. This drop in the rankings also marked the first time no American men players were in the Top 30 in the near half-century of computerized tennis rankings. At the 2021 French Open, Fritz was seeded 30th. He defeated João Sousa in the first round in straight sets. In the second round, Fritz suffered a torn meniscus during his 4-set loss to Dominik Koepfer. Following this, Fritz said he hoped to be back in time for the 2021 Wimbledon Championships following surgery. Fritz would end up returning in time to play Wimbledon and proceeded to make the third round, where he lost to Alexander Zverev.

At the 2021 BNP Paribas Open he earned his first top 10 win in 2 years by beating world No. 7 and 5th seed Matteo Berrettini to reach the second fourth round at a Masters 1000 of the year and only the third in his career. It was his first win against a Top-10 opponent in 2021 and the seventh of his career. Fritz then beat 10th seed Jannik Sinner to advance to his first Masters 1000 quarterfinal. There, he saved 2 match points to earn his biggest win of the year, beating world No. 4 and 3rd seed Alexander Zverev to reach his first Masters 1000 semifinal, where he lost to Nikoloz Basilashvili.

At the 2021 St. Petersburg Open, Fritz turned 24, and won against countryman Tommy Paul. He would end up making the final, where he lost to Marin Čilić.

Fritz made his second Masters 1000 quarterfinal at the 2021 Rolex Paris Masters, where he beat Lorenzo Sonego, 5th seed and world No. 6 Andrey Rublev for his third Top-10 win of the year, and 10th seed and Indian Wells champion Cameron Norrie. He lost to Novak Djokovic in the quarterfinals. With this successful run he reached a new career-high ranking in the top 25 at world No. 23 and became the No. 1 American player in singles on November 8, 2021.

Fritz ended the year ranked 23.

=== 2022: Indian Wells title, top 10 debut ===
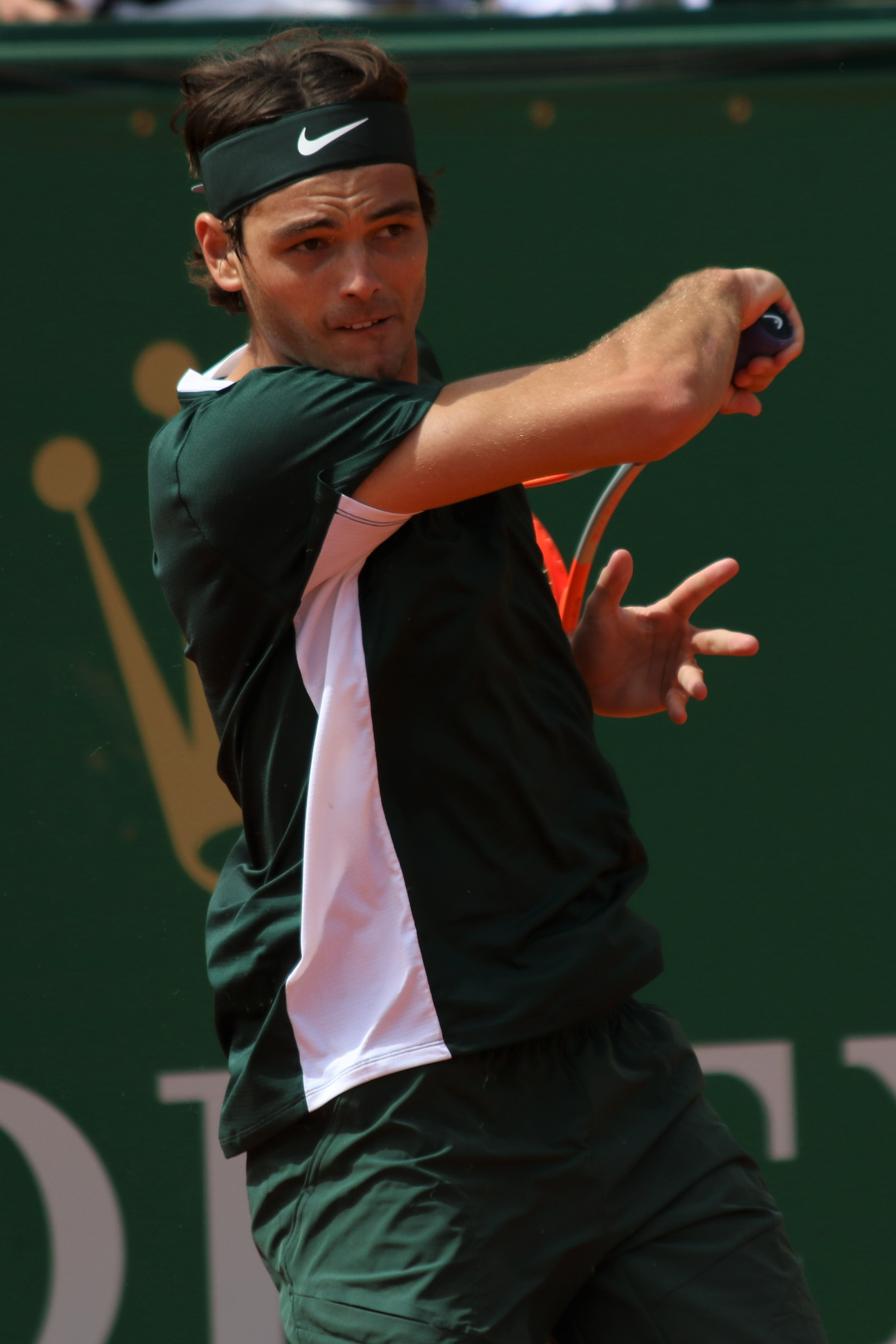
Fritz at the 2022 Monte-Carlo Masters

Fritz started his 2022 season by representing the U.S. at the ATP Cup. The U.S. was in Group C alongside Canada, Great Britain, and Germany. He defeated Félix Auger-Aliassime of Canada and Cameron Norrie of Great Britain, but lost to Alexander Zverev of Germany. The U.S. ended fourth in Group C. Seeded 20th at the Australian Open, Fritz reached the second week of a Grand Slam for the first time after defeating 15th seed, Roberto Bautista Agut, in the third round in five sets. He fell in the fourth round to fourth seed Stefanos Tsitsipas in five sets. As a result, he made his debut in the top 20 of the singles rankings on January 31.

As the top seed at the first edition of the Dallas Open, Fritz made it to the quarterfinals where he was eliminated by seventh seed and compatriot, Marcos Giron. Seeded seventh in Acapulco, he lost in the second round to qualifier Yoshihito Nishioka. Representing the U.S. in the Davis Cup tie against Colombia, Fritz played one match and beat Alejandro González. In the end, the U.S. beat Colombia 4–0 to make up for Colombia defeating them last year.

Seeded 20th in Indian Wells, Fritz became the first American to reach the final at the event since John Isner in 2012 by beating 29th seed, Alex de Minaur, in the fourth round, Miomir Kecmanović in the quarterfinals, and seventh seed, Andrey Rublev, in the semifinals. He then defeated fourth seed, three-time champion, and the then-21 grand slam champion Rafael Nadal in the final in straight sets, claiming his maiden Masters 1000 title, his second career ATP title overall, and snapping Nadal's 20-match winning streak. It was also his first win over a member of the Big Three in nine career matches. It marked the first time an American man had won the Indian Wells title since Andre Agassi in 2001. Fritz made his top 15 debut with his victory, reaching a career-high ranking of no. 13 in the world. Seeded 11th at the Miami Open, Fritz entered the tournament wanting to complete the Sunshine Double. However, he failed to do after losing to in the fourth round to Miomir Kecmanović in three sets.

Fritz started his clay-court season at the U.S. Clay Court Championships in Houston, Texas. Seeded second, he reached the quarterfinals where he lost to fifth seed and 2019 champion, Cristian Garín. Seeded 10th at the Monte-Carlo Masters, he lost in the quarterfinals to eventual finalist Alejandro Davidovich Fokina. Fritz missed the Madrid Open and Italian Open due to a left foot injury. Seeded 13th at the French Open, he was beaten in the second round by qualifier Bernabé Zapata Miralles.

Fritz began his grass-court season at the Libéma Open. Seeded third, he suffered a second-round upset at the hands of Dutch wildcard and eventual champion, Tim van Rijthoven. Seeded fourth at the Queen's Club Championships, he was ousted from the tournament in the first round by British wildcard Jack Draper. Seeded third at the Eastbourne International, he beat sixth seed and defending champion, Alex de Minaur, in the semifinals to reach the final here at this event for the first time since 2019 when he won the title. He defeated compatriot Maxime Cressy in the final to win his third ATP Tour title, and second in Eastbourne. Seeded 11th at Wimbledon, he defeated Alex Molčan and qualifier Jason Kubler in the third and fourth rounds respectively to reach his first Major quarterfinal. In the quarterfinals, he pushed world No. 4, second seed, and two-time champion Rafael Nadal to five sets, but ended up losing the match in a fifth-set tiebreak.

Fritz's American swing began in Washington, where he was the third seed. After beating Alexei Popyrin in straight sets, he retired against Dan Evans in the third round due to the heat, despite having a match point in the second set. At the Canada Masters, he beat Andy Murray and Frances Tiafoe before losing again to Evans in three sets. In Cincinnati, Fritz reached the quarterfinals after beating Sebastián Báez, Nick Kyrgios and sixth seed and world No. 8 Andrey Rublev. He lost to world No. 1 Daniil Medvedev in the quarterfinals. At the US Open he suffered a shocking first round defeat against first time qualifier compatriot Brandon Holt. This was also Holt's first career win on the ATP Tour.

Fritz withdrew from the Korea Open due to COVID-19, however he reached his second ATP 500 tour-level final in Tokyo where, as the third seed, he beat James Duckworth, Hiroki Moriya, received a walkover from 5th seed Nick Kyrgios and beat 7th seed Denis Shapovalov in the semifinals. As a result, he entered the top 10 for the first time in his career. He defeated Frances Tiafoe in straight sets in the final where he became the first American champion since Pete Sampras in 1996. He reached a new career-high ranking of World No. 8 on October 10, 2022, becoming the first American to crack the Top 10 since Jack Sock in 2017. At the Paris Masters, he won against Alejandro Davidovich Fokina in the first round before losing in the second round to French wildcard player Gilles Simon in a three tight-set match that lasted 3 hours and 5 minutes. As a result, he did not qualify for the 2022 ATP Finals but became in line as first alternate. On November 5, with Carlos Alcaraz's withdrawal after an abdominal injury, Fritz qualified for the 2022 ATP Finals, the first American to participate since John Isner in 2018. In the round robin stage, he defeated top seed and world No. 2 Rafael Nadal on his debut. It was his first win over a top-3 player. He then lost to third seeded Casper Ruud but won against Félix Auger-Aliassime to book his spot in the semifinals, the first American since Jack Sock in 2017 to reach this level. It was his 45th tour level win for the season. He lost to Novak Djokovic in straight sets.

Fritz finished the year ranked inside the top-10 for the first time in his career, at world No. 9.

=== 2023: United Cup champion, world No. 5 ===
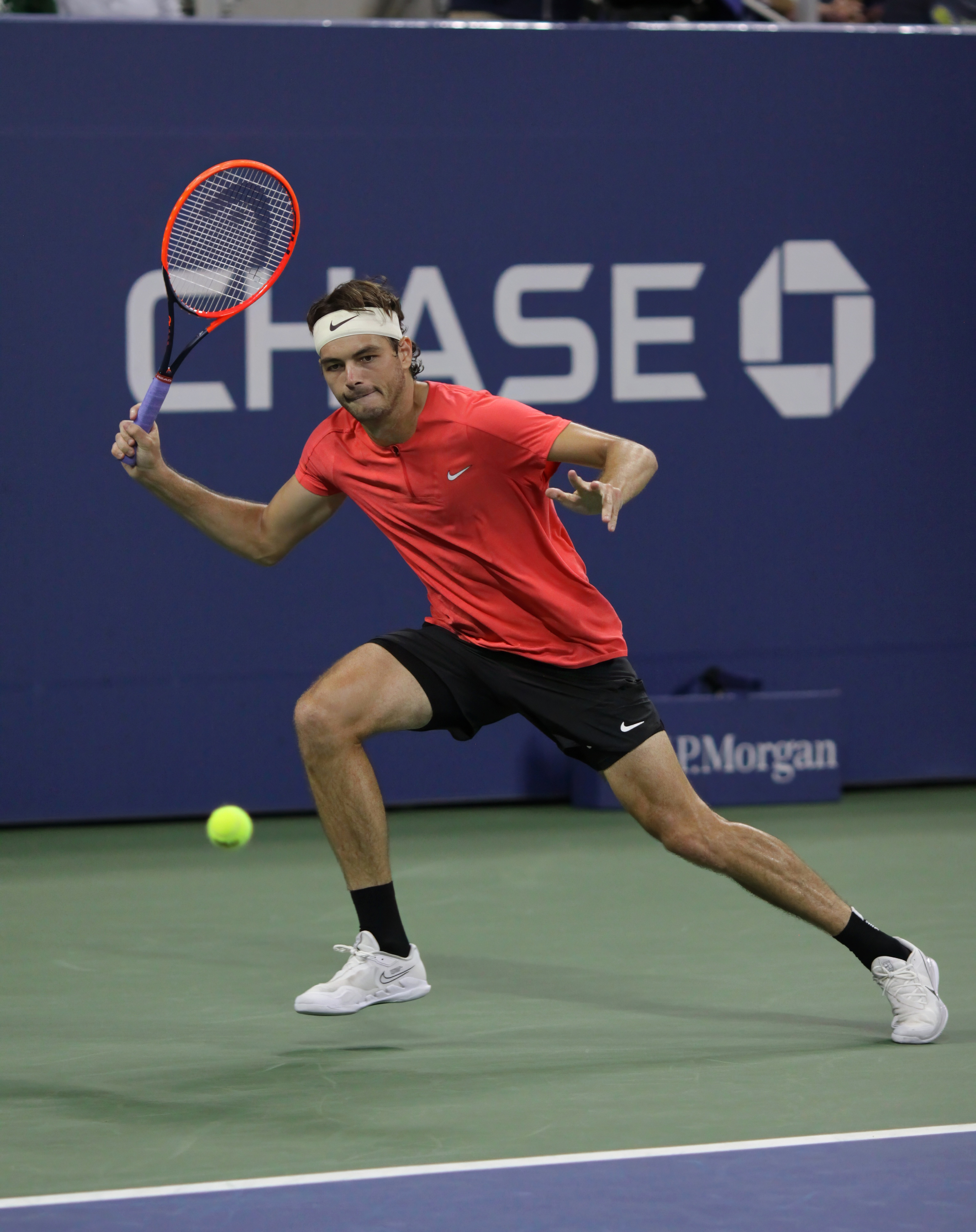
Fritz at the 2023 US Open

Fritz started the season at the inaugural 2023 United Cup, as the No. 1 American male player, where the United States team became champion, defeating Italy in the final. Next, at the Australian Open, he lost in the second round to wildcard Alexei Popyrin. Fritz saved a match point against him in the fourth set to make it two sets each, but lost a hard-fought match lasting more than four hours.

At the 2023 Dallas Open he reached the semifinals where he lost to eventual champion Wu Yibing. As a result, he reached a new career high ranking of world No. 7, becoming the highest ranked American since Mardy Fish in 2011. The following week, as the top seed, he reached back-to-back semifinals at the 2023 Delray Beach Open. Next he defeated Mackenzie McDonald to reach his first ATP final of the season and tenth overall. In the final, he defeated Miomir Kecmanović for his fifth ATP Tour title. As a result, he moved to world No. 5 in the rankings on February 27, 2023. At the Mexican Open he defeated sixth seed Frances Tiafoe to reach his third straight semifinal. Next he lost to seventh seed and compatriot Tommy Paul in an epic match lasting three and a half hours, setting the record for the longest match in the 30-year history of the Abierto Mexicano Telcel. In Indian Wells and in Miami he reached back-to-back quarterfinals defeating 30th seed Sebastián Báez, Márton Fucsovics, and 24th seed Denis Shapovalov, seventh seed Holger Rune en route respectively.l

In Monte Carlo he reached his third consecutive Masters quarterfinal defeating Stan Wawrinka and Jiří Lehečka. He went one step further defeating two-time defending champion and second seed Stefanos Tsitsipas to reach the semifinals recording his 200th win. He became the first American in 20 years to reach the semifinals at this Masters since Vince Spadea. In the semifinals, Fritz lost in three sets to eventual winner Andrey Rublev after winning the first set.

Seeded second at the 2023 BMW Open he again reached the semifinals with wins over Márton Fucsovics and Dominic Thiem. In Madrid he lost to Zhizhen Zhang in the fourth round after Zhang saved three match points to reach the quarterfinals. In Rome he lost in the second round to qualifier Yannick Hanfmann.

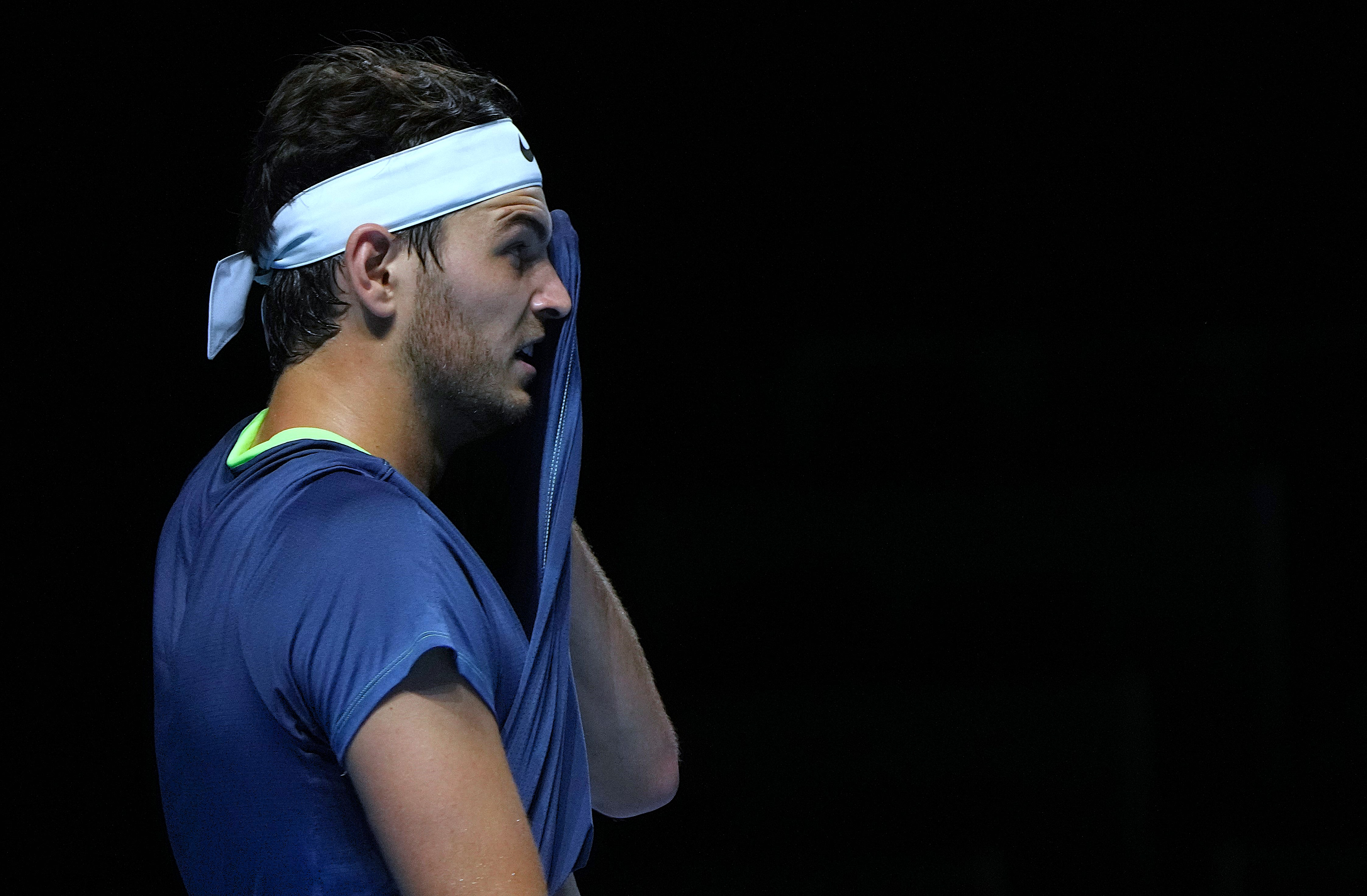
Taylor Fritz at Swiss Indoors Basel 2023

He won his sixth title at the 2023 Atlanta Open, defeating Aleksandar Vukic.

At the US Open he reached the quarterfinals for the first time at this Major but lost to eventual champion Novak Djokovic. At the 2023 Japan Open Tennis Championships where he was the defending champion he lost to world No. 215 wildcard Shintaro Mochizuki after being a set up and serving at 5–2 in the third set for the match. Seeded fifth in Basel, Fritz lost to world No. 83 Alexander Shevchenko after having 15 break points opportunities he missed, in a close to 3 hours match with three tiebreaks. In Paris he withdrew before the second round due to injury and put an early end of the season, although potentially still filling in as an alternate at the 2023 ATP Finals.

=== 2024: US Open final, Olympic doubles bronze ===
He reached his first quarterfinal at the Australian Open defeating seventh seed and previous year runner-up Stefanos Tsitsipas in four sets. He successfully defended his Delray Beach title with a win over compatriot and close friend Tommy Paul. At the 2024 Miami Open he lost in the second round to qualifier Thiago Seyboth Wild, having received a bye at the tournament.

He had a successful start of the clay season, at the Bavarian International Tennis Championships in Munich, where he reached his first clay court final with a win over Cristian Garín and regained the American No. 1 ranking. At the 2024 Mutua Madrid Open he reached his second clay Masters quarterfinal and tenth overall, with wins over Luciano Darderi, 18th seed Sebastián Báez, and eighth seed Hubert Hurkacz, his second top 10 career win on clay. He defeated 21st seed Francisco Cerúndolo, for his 250th career win making him the sixth man born in 1995 or later to reach that milestone. He became the first American man to reach the semifinals of Madrid since it switched to clay in 2009 and the third after Andre Agassi and Robby Ginepri. At the next Masters, the 2024 Italian Open, he reached back-to-back quarterfinals defeating wildcard Fabio Fognini, compatriot and 24th seed Sebastian Korda and eight seed Grigor Dimitrov, becoming the first American man to reach the quarterfinals or better of all three clay court Masters tournaments. It was also the first time multiple American players (with Tommy Paul) reached the quarterfinals in singles in Rome since 2008. At the 2024 French Open he reached the fourth round of a clay Major for the first time with a five-set win over Thanasi Kokkinakis.

Fritz would reach his second quarterfinal at Wimbledon after mounting a comeback from 2 sets down against Alexander Zverev. The American would lose in a five set thriller to Lorenzo Musetti. Seeded third, he reached the Paris Olympics semifinals with Tommy Paul, and won the bronze medal defeating the duo from Czechia, Tomáš Macháč and Adam Pavlásek.

Seeded 12th at the US Open, Fritz reached his first Grand Slam semifinal defeating Camilo Ugo Carabelli, Matteo Berrettini, Francisco Comesaña, world No. 8 Casper Ruud and world No. 4 Alexander Zverev, his first two consecutive top 10 wins in a Major. He became the first American since Andre Agassi in 2001 to reach the fourth round at each of the Grand Slam events in the same season. By reaching the semifinals, he set up an all-American matchup with Frances Tiafoe, who won later in the day, the first at a Grand Slam since 2005 at the US Open, when Andre Agassi and Robby Ginepri met. Fritz won the match in five sets to reach his first Grand Slam final. However, he lost in the final to Jannik Sinner in straight sets. He faced tough times after his loss. With a mix of humor and sincerity, Fritz admitted in an interview on the Nothing Major podcast that the aftermath of the loss was tough to handle, revealing that it took a toll on him emotionally.

In November at the ATP Finals, Fritz reached the semifinals after recording two wins and one loss in the group stages, beating Daniil Medvedev and Alex De Minaur. He then defeated Alexander Zverev in the semi-finals to make his first final at the end-of-season event. In doing so, Fritz became the first American to reach the championship match at the ATP Finals since James Blake in 2006. He lost the final to Jannik Sinner in straight sets. Despite the defeat, Fritz ended the season with a new career-high singles ranking of world No. 4 on November 18, 2024.

=== 2025: United Cup champion, Wimbledon semis ===
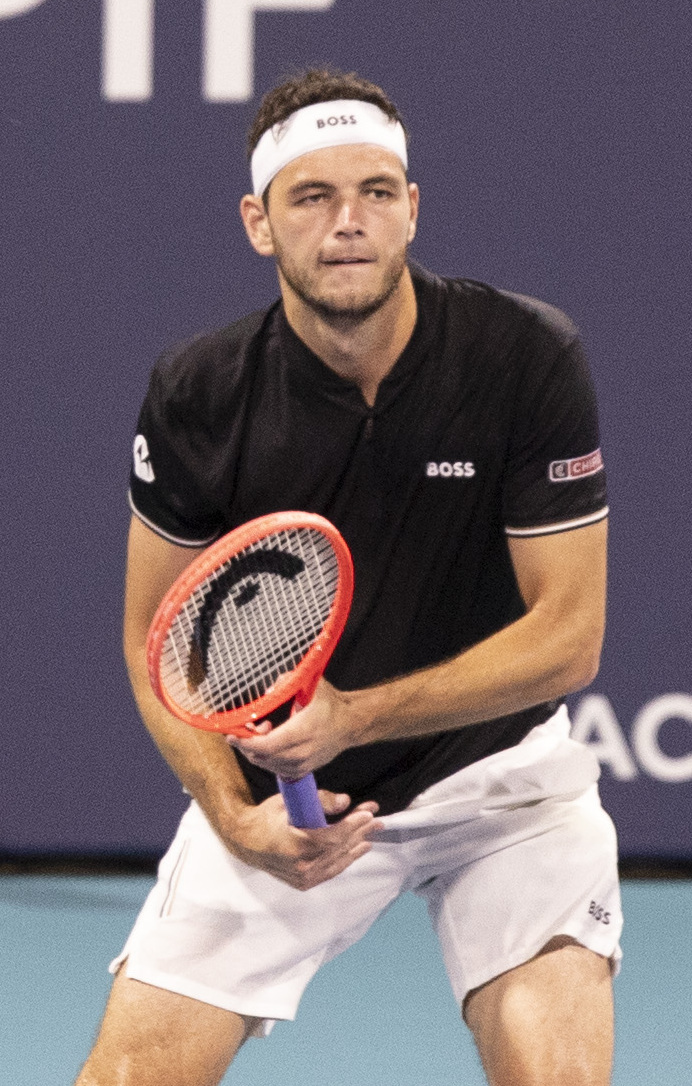
Fritz at the 2025 Miami Open

Opening the year with a career high No. 4 in the world rankings, Fritz wasted no time getting off to a hot start in 2025. He started the year by helping the United States of America take home the United Cup title, their second in three years. In the tournament, he won 4 of his 5 matches, notching wins over Borna Coric, Zhizhen Zhang, Tomas Machac, and Hubert Hurkacz.

Fritz entered the 2025 Australian Open as the fourth seed and cruised through his first two matches, dropping just 8 games in his first two matches against Jenson Brooksby and Christian Garin. However, he struggled in his third round match against Gael Monfils, ultimately losing in 4 sets. This marked his earliest exit at a Grand Slam since the 2023 Wimbledon Championships. Following two disappointing early exits in Delray Beach and Dallas, Fritz entered Indian Wells trying to recapture his win in 2022. Fritz made the fourth round for the 5th straight time, ultimately losing to eventual champion Jack Draper in straight sets.

Fritz entered the Miami Open as the third seed, trying to capture his second ATP 1000 title. Fritz found himself in the quarterfinals for the second time after wins against Lorenzo Sonego, Denis Shapovalov, and Adam Walton. In his quarterfinal match he competed against big server Matteo Berrettini and won in three sets, clinching his first semifinal at the tournament. In the semifinal, Fritz lost a close three set match to the eventual champion, Jakub Menšík.

During the 2025 grass season, Fritz won two titles. The first was the BOSS Open, which he claimed after a fifth straight victory over home hope Alexander Zverev. He then won a fourth title at the Eastbourne International, defeating Jenson Brooksby in the final. Entering Wimbledon as the number five seed, Fritz defeated Karen Khachanov to reach the semifinals for the first time in that tournament, becoming the first American man to do so since John Isner in 2018. He would ultimately lose to two-time defending Wimbledon champion Carlos Alcaraz in a competitive four sets, having held two set points in the fourth set.

Fritz would go on to complete the set of reaching the quarterfinals of all nine Masters 1000 ATP tournaments by defeating Jiří Lehečka in three tiebreaks at the Canadian Open in Toronto, becoming the first American man to achieve this milestone since the tier began in 1990. At the US Open, Fritz reached the quarterfinals, where he lost to Novak Djokovic in four sets. At the 2025 Laver Cup, Fritz recorded his first victory over the world No. 1 Carlos Alcaraz, defeating him in straight sets, as well as defeating Alexander Zverev for the sixth straight time to clinch victory for Team World over Team Europe.

Fritz would then reach the final of the 2025 Japan Open in Tokyo, where Carlos Alcaraz would take his revenge in straight sets following his loss at the 2025 Laver Cup. At the 2025 Rolex Shanghai Masters, he reached the third round and recorded his 50th win of the season, becoming the first American in 20 years to reach the milestone during three consecutive seasons (54 in 2023, 53 in 2024) since Andy Roddick. He would eventually finish the year with the year-end top six ranking.

=== 2026: 350th win, 6 finals, top 10 ===
Taylor Fritz in action against Denis Shapovalov at Swiss Indoors Basel on 29 October 2026.

Fritz entered the Australian Open as the ninth seed, playing through a chronic knee tendinitis issue which had been recurring since late 2025. Fritz would reach the fourth round of the Australian Open, where he lost to the fifth seed Lorenzo Musetti in straight sets. As the top seed at the Dallas Open, Fritz finished as the runner-up in a three set match to the second seed, Ben Shelton. Coming into the Miami Open seeded sixth, Fritz's run ended in a third round loss to Jiří Lehečka in three sets. After the Miami Open, the American took a break from tennis for two months to rehabilitate and improve his knee tendon health.

Fritz began his grass season at the Stuttgart Open, where he was the defending champion and second seed. Fritz recorded his 350th tour-level win by defeating Martin Landaluce in the first round, before losing in three sets to number one seed Ben Shelton in the finals. Fritz then entered the Halle Open as the fifth seed, reaching the finals and losing to Frances Tiafoe in straight sets, thus achieving back-to-back grass finals. As the number six seed at Wimbledon, Fritz faced the second seed Alexander Zverev in the quarterfinals and lost in straight sets, ending his seven-match win streak over the German. Fritz later stated that his knee tendinitis had flared up unexpectedly, hence the medical timeout, but also gave full credit to Zverev's performance.

Fritz started his summer hard court swing as the third seed at the 2026 Mubadala DC Open. Fritz went on to win his second ATP 500 title by defeating Rafael Jódar in straight sets, having saved a match point against Alex Michelsen in the quarterfinals en route to his eleventh ATP tour singles title. Competing at the US Open as the ninth seed, Fritz suffered an upset in the third round to the twenty-fourth seed Francisco Cerúndolo in five sets after having a two set lead.

Fritz's autumn indoor swing commenced at the Lyon Open, where he reached the finals as the second seed and was defeated by the sixth seed Lorenzo Musetti in straight sets. Afterwards, seeded sixth at Swiss Indoors in Basel, Fritz lost in the semifinals to Valentin Vacherot in straight sets. At the Paris Masters, Fritz as the eleventh seed, faced the number three seed Carlos Alcaraz in the quarterfinals. Fritz held two match points against the Spaniard, but ultimately lost in three sets. The result meant that Fritz had failed to qualify for the 2026 ATP Finals, although filling in as a potential second alternate.

Entering the Stockholm Open as the number one seed, Fritz won his twelfth ATP tour singles title, defeating Thiago Agustín Tirante in three sets to claim his second title of the season and finish the year within the world's top 10. This was a maiden indoor hard court title and a sixth final of the year for the American, marking the most finals he has achieved in a calendar year.

== Sponsorships ==
Starting in early 2024, Fritz wears Hugo Boss clothing on court- before this he had a clothing sponsorship with Nike. He uses ASICS Gel-Resolution tennis shoes and a pro stock Head Radical MP tennis racquet.

Fritz has other miscellaneous partnerships with various companies such as Motorola, sleep accessory brand Eight Sleep, La Roche Posay, and perhaps most famously, he has a deal with Chipotle Mexican Grill.

== Playing style ==
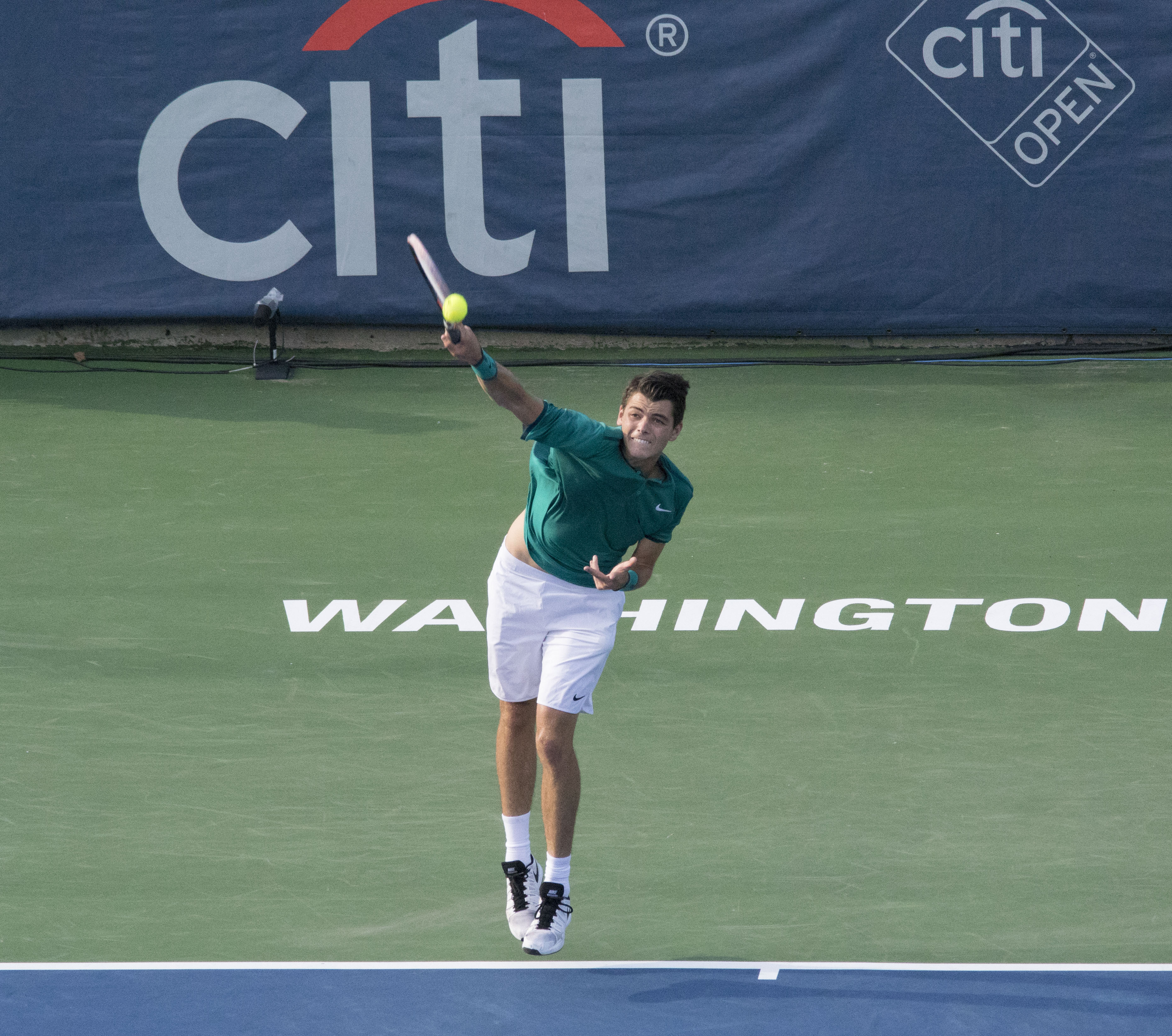
Fritz hitting a serve

Fritz is an offensive baseliner. Fritz has strong groundstrokes and often misleads his opponents, or outright end points as winners. His most powerful and consistent stroke is his forehand, and he possesses a strong backhand as well, that has a flat, low bounce. His game is not suited for the net, but he has improved his net game and movement since he first began his career.

Standing 6 feet 5 inches (1.96 metres) tall, Fritz has a strong, fast paced serve that has reached 149 miles per hour (240 km/h), and strong groundstrokes off both wings. Fritz utilizes an almost full-western grip on his forehand bordering on Hawaiian, which is a defining aspect of his style. One of Fritz's defining strengths is his ability to hit sharp angle cross-court shots on both the backhand and forehand sides. He also has a good topspin lob.

== Personal life ==
Fritz has a son, Jordan (born in 2017), with former aspiring pro tennis player Raquel Pedraza, to whom he was married from 2016 to 2019.

Fritz is a gamer and plays games like World of Warcraft and Rust. Fritz occasionally live streams his video game play on his Twitch channel under the name TaylorFritz97.

For six years (2020–2026), Fritz was in a relationship with fashion influencer Morgan Riddle; who gained online celebrity from posting content about life on the professional tennis tour. The pair met on the dating app Raya, and they broke up in the spring of 2026.

=== Television and film ===
Fritz appeared in the tennis docuseries Break Point, which premiered on Netflix on January 13, 2023, and ended in 2024.

== World TeamTennis ==
Fritz has played three seasons with World TeamTennis, making his debut in 2015 with the San Diego Aviators. He has since played another two seasons for the Aviators, in 2018 and 2019. Fritz joined the Philadelphia Freedoms during the 2020 WTT season at The Greenbrier. The Freedoms advanced to the WTT Playoffs as the No. 1 seed, but ultimately fell to the New York Empire in the semifinal. Fritz was named the WTT 2020 Male MVP.

== Career statistics ==
=== Grand Slam singles performance timeline ===
Key
W	F	SF	QF	#R	RR	Q#	P#	DNQ	A	Z#	PO	G	S	B	NMS	NTI	P	NH

(W) winner; (F) finalist; (SF) semifinalist; (QF) quarterfinalist; (#R) rounds 4, 3, 2, 1; (RR) round-robin stage; (Q#) qualification round; (P#) preliminary round; (DNQ) did not qualify; (A) absent; (Z#) Davis/Fed Cup Zonal Group (with number indication) or (PO) play-off; (G) gold, (S) silver or (B) bronze Olympic/Paralympic medal; (NMS) not a Masters tournament; (NTI) not a Tier I tournament; (P) postponed; (NH) not held; (SR) strike rate (events won / competed); (W–L) win–loss record.
To avoid confusion and double counting, these charts are updated at the conclusion of a tournament or when the player's participation has ended.

Current through the 2026 US Open.

Tournament	2014	2015	2016	2017	2018	2019	2020	2021	2022	2023	2024	2025	2026	SR	W–L	Win%
Australian Open	A	A	1R	1R	Q2	3R	3R	3R	4R	2R	QF	3R	4R	0 / 10	19–10	66%
French Open	A	A	1R	A	1R	2R	3R	2R	2R	3R	4R	1R	1R	0 / 10	10–10	50%
Wimbledon	A	A	1R	1R	2R	2R	NH	3R	QF	2R	QF	SF	QF	0 / 10	22–10	69%
US Open	Q1	Q1	1R	2R	3R	1R	3R	2R	1R	QF	F	QF	3R	0 / 10	22–11	67%
Win–Loss	0–0	0–0	0–4	1–3	3–3	4–4	6–3	6–4	8–4	8–4	17–4	11–4	9–4	0 / 40	73–41	64%

=== Grand Slam tournaments ===
==== Singles: 1 (runner-up) ====
Result	Year	Tournament	Surface	Opponent	Score
Loss	2024	US Open	Hard	(Italy) Jannik Sinner	3–6, 4–6, 5–7

=== Year-end championship (ATP Finals) ===
==== Singles: 1 (runner-up) ====
Result	Year	Tournament	Surface	Opponent	Score
Loss	2024	ATP Finals, Italy	Hard (i)	(Italy) Jannik Sinner	4–6, 4–6

=== ATP 1000 tournaments ===
==== Singles: 1 (title) ====
Result	Year	Tournament	Surface	Opponent	Score
Win	2022	Indian Wells Open	Hard	(Spain) Rafael Nadal	6–3, 7–6^{(7–5)}

=== Summer Olympics ===
==== Doubles: 1 (bronze medal) ====
Result	Year	Tournament	Surface	Partner	Opponents	Score
Bronze	2024	Paris Summer Olympics	Clay	(United States) Tommy Paul	(Czech Republic) Tomáš Macháč (Czech Republic) Adam Pavlásek	6–3, 6–4

== Notes ==
Awards and achievements
Preceded by (Russia) Andrey Rublev	ITF Junior World Champion; 2015	Succeeded by (Serbia) Miomir Kecmanović
Preceded by (Germany) Alexander Zverev	ATP Star of Tomorrow; 2016	Succeeded by (Canada) Denis Shapovalov
