= Dallas Open (2022) =

ATP Tour
- Event name: Nexo Dallas Open (2026-)
- Founded: 2022
- Editions: 5 (2026)
- Location: Frisco, Texas; United States
- Venue: Ford Center at the Star
- Category: ATP 250 (2022–2024); ATP 500 (2025–present)
- Surface: Hard (indoor)
- Draw: 32S / 16D
- Prize money: $2,833,235 (2026)
- Website: DallasOpen.com

Current champions (2026)
- Singles: (United States) Ben Shelton
- Doubles: (France) Théo Arribagé (France) Albano Olivetti

The Dallas Open is an ATP 500 professional tennis tournament held annually in Frisco, Texas, near Dallas, United States, on indoor hardcourts. The event takes place at the Ford Center at The Star. The tournament was relocated there from Uniondale, New York where it was known as the New York Open.

The 2022 Dallas Open marked a return for the ATP Tour tournament in Dallas, as the last Dallas Open was held in 1983. In 2025, the tournament was upgraded to an ATP 500 level event offering athletes $2,760,000 in prize money. In 2026, the tournament officially became known as the Nexo Dallas Open for sponsorship reasons.

== Past finals ==
=== Singles ===
| Year | Champions | Runners-up | Score |
|---|---|---|---|
↓ ATP Tour 250 ↓
| 2022 | (United States) Reilly Opelka | (United States) Jenson Brooksby | 7–6^{(7–5)}, 7–6^{(7–3)} |
| 2023 | (China) Wu Yibing | (United States) John Isner | 6–7^{(3–7)}, 7–6^{(7–4)}, 7–6^{(14–12)} |
| 2024 | (United States) Tommy Paul | (United States) Marcos Giron | 7–6^{(7–3)}, 5–7, 6–3 |
↓ ATP Tour 500 ↓
| 2025 | (Canada) Denis Shapovalov | (Norway) Casper Ruud | 7–6^{(7–5)}, 6–3 |
| 2026 | (United States) Ben Shelton | (United States) Taylor Fritz | 3–6, 6–3, 7–5 |

=== Doubles ===
| Year | Champions | Runners-up | Score |
|---|---|---|---|
↓ ATP Tour 250 ↓
| 2022 | (El Salvador) Marcelo Arévalo (Netherlands) Jean-Julien Rojer | (United Kingdom) Lloyd Glasspool (Finland) Harri Heliövaara | 7–6^{(7–4)}, 6–4 |
| 2023 | (United Kingdom) Jamie Murray (New Zealand) Michael Venus | (United States) Nathaniel Lammons (United States) Jackson Withrow | 1–6, 7–6^{(7–4)}, [10–7] |
| 2024 | (Australia) Max Purcell (Australia) Jordan Thompson | (United States) William Blumberg (Australia) Rinky Hijikata | 6–4, 2–6, [10–8] |
↓ ATP Tour 500 ↓
| 2025 | (United States) Christian Harrison (United States) Evan King | (Uruguay) Ariel Behar (United States) Robert Galloway | 7–6^{(7–4)}, 7–6^{(7–4)} |
| 2026 | (France) Théo Arribagé (France) Albano Olivetti | (Spain) Marcel Granollers (Argentina) Horacio Zeballos | 6–3, 7–6^{(7–4)} |
