= Liam Krall =

American tennis player (born 2002)

- Country (sports): United States
- Born: May 20, 2002 (age 24) Bronxville, New York, United States
- Height: 1.89 m (6 ft 2 in)
- Plays: Right-handed (two-handed backhand)
- College: SMU
- Prize money: $2,384

Singles
- Career record: 0–1 (at ATP Tour level, Grand Slam level, and in Davis Cup)
- Career titles: 0

Doubles
- Career record: 0–0 (at ATP Tour level, Grand Slam level, and in Davis Cup)
- Career titles: 0
- Last updated on: February 6, 2022.

Liam Krall (born May 20, 2002) is an American tennis player.

Krall plays college tennis at Southern Methodist University.

== Career ==
Krall made his ATP main draw debut at the 2023 Dallas Open after getting a wildcard entry into the singles main draw.
