= Marcos Giron =

American tennis player (born 1993)

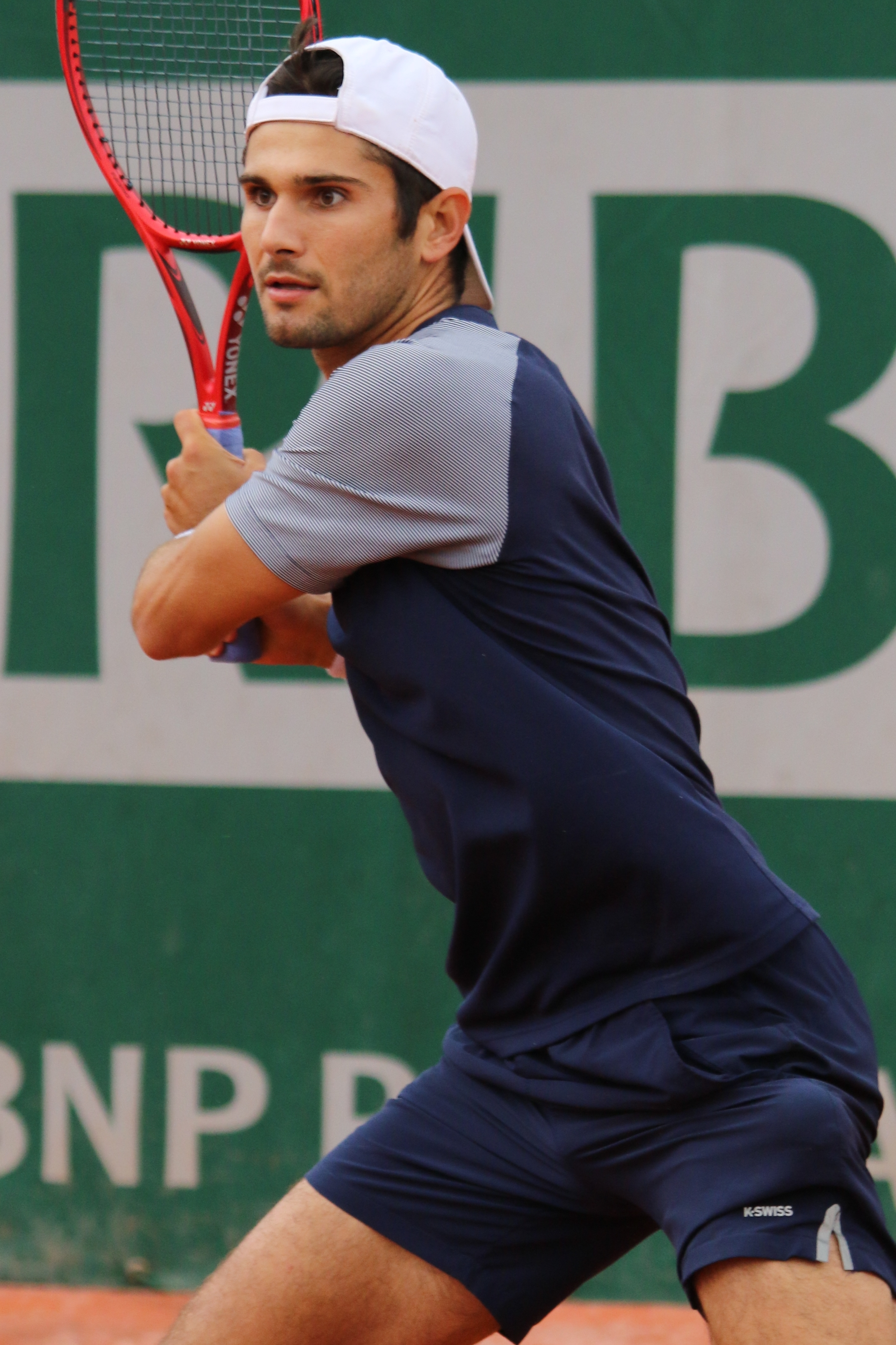
- Giron at the 2019 French Open
- Native name: Marcos Andrés Girón
- Country (sports): United States
- Residence: Thousand Oaks, California, US
- Born: July 24, 1993 (age 33) Thousand Oaks, California, US
- Height: 5 ft 11 in (1.80 m)
- Turned pro: 2014
- Plays: Right-handed (two-handed backhand)
- College: UCLA
- Coach: Nicolas Meister
- Prize money: US $7,214,687

Singles
- Career record: 138–164
- Career titles: 1
- Highest ranking: No. 37 (August 5, 2024)
- Current ranking: No. 94 (November 9, 2026)

Grand Slam singles results
- Australian Open: 3R (2025)
- French Open: 3R (2021, 2023)
- Wimbledon: 3R (2026)
- US Open: 2R (2020, 2021, 2025)

Other tournaments
- Olympic Games: 2R (2020)

Doubles
- Career record: 10–36
- Career titles: 0
- Highest ranking: No. 194 (August 1, 2022)

Grand Slam doubles results
- Australian Open: 3R (2022)
- French Open: 2R (2023)
- Wimbledon: 2R (2025)
- US Open: 1R (2014, 2021, 2022, 2024, 2025, 2026)
- Last updated on: August 31, 2026.

Marcos Andres Giron (/ɡiːˈroʊn/ ghee-ROHN; born July 24, 1993; Spanish: Girón) is an American professional tennis player. He has a career-high singles ranking of world No. 37 achieved on August 5, 2024 and a doubles ranking of No. 194 achieved on August 1, 2022. Giron won the singles title at the 2014 NCAA Division I Tennis Championships for UCLA. He has won an ATP Tour title at the 2024 Hall of Fame Open.

== Early life and background ==
Marcos Andres Giron was born on July 24, 1993 in Thousand Oaks, California to parents Andres, an Argentine physician specializing in internal medicine, and Rosanna, who is from Ecuador. His parents introduced him to tennis at age 6, at a local park. Giron has a sister, named Gabriela.

== Career ==
=== 2009-2011: Juniors ===
Giron won the boys' singles in the Ojai Tennis Tournament in 2009 and the men’s invitational in 2011.

=== 2020: First Major wins & top 100 ===
Giron reached the second round of a major for the first time at the US Open where he defeated Marc Polmans in five sets. A month later, he reached the second round of the French Open, defeating Quentin Halys in five sets. In both victories, he came back from a two-sets-to-one deficit.

In November, Giron recorded his first top-ten win against seventh seed Matteo Berrettini at the Paris Masters.

=== 2021: Major third round, Olympics debut ===
Giron started his 2021 season at the Murray River Open, an event that was organized as a lead-up tournament to the Australian Open due to other tournaments in Australia being cancelled as a result from the COVID-19 pandemic. He beat 10th seed, Adrian Mannarino, in the second round. He lost in the third round to eighth seed and eventual champion, Dan Evans. He participated in the main draw as a direct entry at the Australian Open for a second consecutive year. He lost in the first round to sixth seed and world No. 7, Alexander Zverev, in four sets.

At the Open Sud de France, Giron was defeated in the first round by qualifier Tallon Griekspoor. Getting past qualifying at the Rotterdam Open, he was eliminated in the first round by fourth seed, world No. 8, and eventual champion, Andrey Rublev.

In June, Giron reached the third round of a major at the French Open for the first time in his career.

At Halle, Giron reached his first quarterfinal at an ATP 500 level tournament as a qualifier where he was defeated by Félix Auger-Aliassime. As a result of this good run, he reached a then career-high of No. 65 on 21 June 2021.

Giron made the second round at the Olympics, beating Norbert Gombos before losing to Kei Nishikori in three sets.

In September at the Sofia Open, Giron reached his fourth quarterfinal of the season (with quarterfinal appearances in Halle, Metz and Winston-Salem) after defeating third seed Alex de Minaur in the second round. He later beat 8th seed John Millman in 70 minutes to move into his first career ATP tour-level semifinal, where he lost to second seed Gaël Monfils. As a result, he reached a new career-high ranking in the top 60, at world No. 59 on 4 October 2021.

=== 2022: Top 50 & first ATP Tour final ===
Giron started his 2022 season at the first edition of the Melbourne Summer Set 1. He lost in the first round to qualifier Ričardas Berankis. At the Sydney Classic, he was defeated in the first round by Australian wildcard Jordan Thompson. At the Australian Open, he was beaten in the first round by sixth seed, world No. 5, and eventual champion Rafael Nadal.

Seeded seventh at the first edition of the Dallas Open, Giron upset world No. 19 Taylor Fritz in the quarterfinals to reach his second ATP tour semifinal. He lost in his semifinal match to fourth seed Jenson Brooksby in three sets despite holding four match points. In Delray Beach, he was defeated in the second round by John Millman. At the Mexican Open in Acapulco, he upset eighth seed and world No. 17 Pablo Carreño Busta in the second round. He lost in the quarterfinals to third seed and world No. 4 Stefanos Tsitsipas. At the Indian Wells Masters, he was eliminated in the first round by Lorenzo Musetti. In Miami, he lost in the first round to Márton Fucsovics.

Giron started his clay court season at the U.S. Men's Clay Court Championships. He lost in the first round to world No. 30 Frances Tiafoe. At the Monte-Carlo Masters, he was defeated in the first round by eventual finalist Alejandro Davidovich Fokina. In Barcelona, he lost in the first round to Federico Coria. At the BMW Open in Munich, he fell in the first round to Hugo Gaston. At the Madrid Open, he lost in the first round of qualifying to Alejandro Tabilo. On his debut at the Italian Open as a lucky loser, he upset 12th seed Diego Schwartzman in the second round. He lost in the third round to Félix Auger-Aliassime. In Geneva, he lost in the first round to Ilya Ivashka. He made his top 50 debut on 16 May 2022. At the French Open, he was defeated in the first round by Grigor Dimitrov.

Giron started his grass court season at the BOSS Open in Stuttgart. He lost in the first round to German wildcard Jan-Lennard Struff, despite having two match points in the third set tiebreak. At the Halle Open, he was defeated in the first round by Félix Auger-Aliassime. In Mallorca, he reached the quarterfinals where he lost to second seed Stefanos Tsitsipas. At Wimbledon, he upset 24th seed Holger Rune in the first round. He lost in the second round to Alex Molčan.

Giron started his US Open series at the Atlanta Open. He lost in the first round to Kwon Soon-woo despite leading by a break in the third set. At the Citi Open in Washington, D.C., he was defeated in the first round by eventual champion Nick Kyrgios. Getting past qualifying at the National Bank Open in Montreal, he lost in the first round to Roberto Bautista Agut. Making it past qualifying at the Western & Southern Open, he beat David Goffin in the first round. He was defeated in the second round by Bautista Agut. At the US Open, he lost in the first round to Frances Tiafoe.

Seeded third at the San Diego Open, Giron reached his maiden ATP tour final after defeating Dan Evans in his semifinal match. He lost in the final to Brandon Nakashima. Competing at the first edition of the Gijón Open, he was defeated in the second round by Dominic Thiem in three sets. In Antwerp, he lost in the first round to Sebastian Korda. At the Erste Bank Open in Vienna, he upset Cameron Norrie in the second round. He lost in his quarterfinal match to Grigor Dimitrov.

=== 2023: French third round, two top 10 wins ===
Giron started his 2023 season at the Adelaide International 1. He lost in the second round to Australian qualifier Alexei Popyrin. In Auckland, he reached the quarterfinals where he was defeated by second seed Cameron Norrie. At the Australian Open, he lost in the first round to Daniil Medvedev.

Seeded seventh at the Dallas Open, Giron made it to the quarterfinals where he was beaten by top seed Taylor Fritz in a rematch from last year. At the Delray Beach Open, he upset eighth seed Ben Shelton in the first round. In the second round, he ended the dream ATP Tour debut of 33-year-old qualifier Matija Pecotić. He lost in his quarterfinal match to Miomir Kecmanović. In Acapulco, he was defeated in the first round by compatriot Michael Mmoh. At the BNP Paribas Open, he was eliminated from the tournament in the second round by Frances Tiafoe. At the Miami Open, he fell in the first round to qualifier Cristian Garín.

Giron started his clay-court season at the U.S. Men's Clay Court Championships. Seeded seventh, he lost in the second round to qualifier Tomáš Macháč. At the BMW Open, he upset seventh seed Roberto Carballés Baena in the first round. He ended up reaching the quarterfinals where he was defeated by Botic van de Zandschulp. Playing at the Madrid Open, he lost in the second round to 25th seed Sebastián Báez. He reached the third round at the 2023 French Open for a second time in his career and overall at a Major level defeating qualifier Hamad Međedović and Jiří Lehečka.

Giron qualified for the Canadian Open, with wins over Nick Chappell and Radu Albot. After defeating Emil Ruusuvuori in the first round, he upset world No. 6 Holger Rune in three sets, the biggest win of his career and second top-10 win. He then lost to compatriot Tommy Paul in the third round. At the ATP 500 2023 Japan Open Tennis Championships he reached the semifinals as a qualifier after defeating home favorite Yoshihito Nishioka, second seed Casper Ruud, his third top-10 win, and eight seed Félix Auger-Aliassime, last two matches in straight sets.

Giron was coached by former UCLA teammate Karue Sell during the 2023 season.

=== 2024: First ATP title, top 40 ===
Giron reached his second ATP final at the 2024 Dallas Open defeating top seed Frances Tiafoe and fourth seed Adrian Mannarino in straight sets before losing to Tommy Paul. The following week at the 2024 Delray Beach Open, he reached for the first time a consecutive ATP semifinal (his sixth in his career), defeating Emilio Nava, again fourth seed Adrian Mannarino this time in three sets, and wildcard Patrick Kypson. He lost to defending champion and top seed Taylor Fritz in straight sets. As a result he reached a new career-high ranking in the top 45 on 19 February 2024.

At the beginning of the grass season, at the 2024 BOSS Open in Stuttgart, Giron defeated Andy Murray. In Halle, he upset fourth seed Andrey Rublev, his first top 10 win on this surface, to reach the round of 16. Next he defeated Matteo Berrettini in three sets to reach the quarterfinals. His good form continued at the next grass court tournament, the 2024 Eastbourne International where he defeated defending champion and fifth seed Francisco Cerundolo in the first round. At the 2024 Wimbledon Championships, he also reached the second round with a win over wildcard Henry Searle.

Giron won his first ATP title at the 2024 Hall of Fame Open, defeating Alex Michelsen in the final making him the tenth first-time ATP Tour champion for 2024. En route to the title, he registered wins over Alex Bolt in the quarterfinals and Christopher Eubanks in the last four. As a result he reached a new career-high ranking of No. 38 on 22 July 2024.

=== 2025: Masters fourth round, top 5 wins ===
Giron reached the third round of the 2025 Australian Open for the first time defeating Tomas Martin Etcheverry in five sets.

At the 2025 BNP Paribas Open Giron took out the world No. 5 and fourth seed Casper Ruud to reach the third round at the tournament for the second time. It was his first top 5 win in his career. He followed that with toppling down another seeded player, 26th seed Alexei Popyrin to reach a Masters fourth round for the first time in his career.

=== 2026: Consecutive ATP semifinals, ATP 175 final ===
After reaching consecutive ATP semifinals in Hong Kong and at the 2026 ASB Classic in Auckland, Giron reached another semifinal at the 2026 Arizona Classic in Phoenix, with wins over Jay Friend and defending champion Nuno Borges. He went one step further and reached the final defeating top seed Corentin Moutet in the semifinal.

== Personal life ==
Giron enjoys the outdoors and also plays other sports, such as skiing and mountain biking. He also follows professional basketball, and is a fan of the Los Angeles Lakers.

== Singles performance timeline ==
Key
W	F	SF	QF	#R	RR	Q#	P#	DNQ	A	Z#	PO	G	S	B	NMS	NTI	P	NH

(W) winner; (F) finalist; (SF) semifinalist; (QF) quarterfinalist; (#R) rounds 4, 3, 2, 1; (RR) round-robin stage; (Q#) qualification round; (DNQ) did not qualify; (A) absent; (NH) not held; (SR) strike rate (events won / competed); (W–L) win–loss record.
To avoid confusion and double counting, these charts are updated at the conclusion of a tournament or when the player's participation has ended.

Current through the 2026 Hamburg Open.

Tournament	2014	2015	2016	2017	2018	2019	2020	2021	2022	2023	2024	2025	2026	SR	W–L	Win %
Grand Slam tournaments
Australian Open	A	A	A	A	A	A	1R	1R	1R	1R	1R	3R	1R	0 / 7	2–7	22%
French Open	A	A	A	A	A	Q2	2R	3R	1R	3R	1R	1R	1R	0 / 7	5–7	45%
Wimbledon	A	A	A	A	A	1R	NH	2R	2R	2R	2R	2R	3R	0 / 7	7–7	45%
US Open	1R	Q1	A	Q1	A	1R	2R	2R	1R	1R	1R	2R		0 / 8	3–8	27%
Win–loss	0–1	0–0	0–0	0–0	0–0	0–2	2–3	4–4	1–4	3–4	1–4	4–4	2–3	0 / 29	17–29	36%
National representation
Summer Olympics	NH		A	NH				2R	NH		1R	NH		0 / 2	1–2	–
ATP 1000 tournaments
Indian Wells Open	Q1	A	A	Q1	Q1	3R	NH	2R	1R	2R	1R	4R	2R	0 / 7	8–7	53%
Miami Open	A	A	A	A	A	A	NH	2R	1R	1R	1R	1R	1R	0 / 6	1–6	14%
Monte-Carlo Masters	A	A	A	A	A	A	NH	A	1R	A	1R	2R	A	0 / 3	1–3	25%
Madrid Open	A	A	A	A	A	A	NH	2R	Q1	2R	1R	2R	1R	0 / 5	3–5	38%
Italian Open	A	A	A	A	A	A	Q1	Q1	3R	1R	2R	3R	1R	0 / 5	5–5	50%
Canadian Open	A	A	A	A	A	A	NH	Q1	1R	3R	1R	1R		0 / 4	2–4	33%
Cincinnati Open	Q1	A	A	A	A	A	2R	1R	2R	Q1	1R	1R		0 / 5	2–5	29%
Shanghai Masters	A	A	A	A	A	A	NH			2R	3R	1R		0 / 3	3–3	50%
Paris Masters	A	A	A	A	A	A	3R	3R	Q1	1R	2R	1R		0 / 5	5–5	50%
Win–loss	0–0	0–0	0–0	0–0	0–0	2–1	3–2	5–5	3–6	5–7	4–9	7–9	1–4	0 / 43	30–43	41%
Career statistics
Tournaments	2	0	0	0	1	4	9	20	28	29	27	27	10	Career total: 157		
Titles	0	0	0	0	0	0	0	0	0	0	1	0	0	Career total: 1		
Finals	0	0	0	0	0	0	0	0	1	0	2	0	0	Career total: 3		
Overall win–loss	0–2	0–0	0–0	0–0	1–1	2–4	9–9	23–21	18–28	24–29	27–26	23–27	8–10	135–156		
Win %	0%	–	–	–	50%	33%	50%	52%	39%	45%	51%	46%	44%	46%		
Year-end ranking	375	469	579	295	308	102	73	66	61	60	46	66		$6,750,102		

== ATP Tour finals ==
=== Singles: 3 (1 title, 2 runner-ups) ===
Legend Grand Slam (0–0) ATP 1000 (0–0) ATP 500 (0–0) ATP 250 (1–2)	Finals by surface Hard (0–2) Clay (0–0) Grass (1–0)	Finals by setting Outdoor (1–1) Indoor (0–1)

Result	W–L	Date	Tournament	Tier	Surface	Opponent	Score
Loss	0–1	Sep 2022	San Diego Open, United States	ATP 250	Hard	(United States) Brandon Nakashima	4–6, 4–6
Loss	0–2	Feb 2024	Dallas Open, United States	ATP 250	Hard (i)	(United States) Tommy Paul	6–7^{(3–7)}, 7–5, 3–6
Win	1–2	Jul 2024	Hall of Fame Open, United States	ATP 250	Grass	(United States) Alex Michelsen	6–7^{(4–7)}, 6–3, 7–5

== ATP Challenger and ITF Futures finals ==
=== Singles: 14 (8 titles, 6 runner-ups) ===
Legend ATP Challenger Tour (2–2) ITF Futures (6–4)	Finals by surface Hard (8–6) Clay (0–0) Grass (0–0) Carpet (0–0)

Result	W–L	Date	Tournament	Tier	Surface	Opponent	Score
Win	1–0	Jan 2019	Orlando Open, US	Challenger	Hard	(Barbados) Darian King	6–4, 6–4
Loss	1–1	Sep 2019	Oracle Challenger Series – New Haven, US	Challenger	Hard	(United States) Tommy Paul	3–6, 3–6
Win	2–1	Nov 2019	Oracle Challenger Series – Houston, US	Challenger	Hard	(Croatia) Ivo Karlović	7–5, 6–7^{(5–7)}, 7–6^{(11–9)}
Loss	2–2	Mar 2026	Arizona Tennis Classic, US	Challenger	Hard	(United States) Ethan Quinn	6–7^{(1–7)}, 6–4, 5–7

Result	W–L	Date	Tournament	Tier	Surface	Opponent	Score
Win	1–0	Sep 2013	F23 Claremont, US	Futures	Hard	(United States) Dennis Novikov	6–0, 7–5
Win	2–0	Sep 2013	F25 Laguna Niguel, US	Futures	Hard	(United States) Jarmere Jenkins	4–6, 6–1, 6–1
Win	3–0	Mar 2014	F9 Calabasas, US	Futures	Hard	(United States) Jason Jung	6–4, 4–6, 6–4
Loss	3–1	Nov 2014	F13 Mazatlan, Mexico	Futures	Hard	(United States) Daniel Nguyen	0–6, 6–2, 6–7^{(0–7)}
Win	4–1	Oct 2016	F33 Berkeley, US	Futures	Hard	(Sweden) André Göransson	5–7, 7–6^{(7–5)}, 6–4
Win	5–1	Jan 2017	F2 Long Beach, US	Futures	Hard	(United States) Collin Altamirano	7–6^{(7–3)}, 6–1
Loss	5–2	May 2017	F7 Wuhan, China	Futures	Hard	(Australia) Dayne Kelly	6–7^{(4–7)}, 6–7^{(6–8)}
Win	6–2	May 2017	F8 Fuzhou, China	Futures	Hard	(United States) Alexander Sarkissian	7–5, 6–4
Loss	6–3	Jul 2017	F4 Saskatoon, Canada	Futures	Hard	(Canada) Filip Peliwo	6–7^{(7–9)}, 7–6^{(7–5)}, 1–6
Loss	6–4	Mar 2018	F8 Calabasas, US	Futures	Hard	(United States) JC Aragone	2–6, 4–6

=== Doubles: 9 (5 titles, 4 runner-ups) ===
Legend ATP Challenger Tour (2–0) ITF Futures (3–4)	Finals by surface Hard (4–3) Clay (1–1) Grass (0–0) Carpet (0–0)

Result	W–L	Date	Tournament	Tier	Surface	Partner	Opponents	Score
Win	1–0	Feb 2019	RBC Tennis Championships of Dallas, US	Challenger	Hard (i)	(United States) Dennis Novikov	(Croatia) Ante Pavić (South Africa) Ruan Roelofse	6–4, 7–6^{(7–3)}
Win	2–0	Mar 2019	Oracle Challenger Series – Indian Wells, US	Challenger	Hard	(United States) JC Aragone	(Barbados) Darian King (United States) Hunter Reese	6–4, 6–4

Result	W–L	Date	Tournament	Tier	Surface	Partner	Opponents	Score
Loss	0–1	Sep 2012	F26 Irvine, US	Futures	Hard	(United States) Dennis Novikov	(United States) Devin Britton (United States) Austin Krajicek	2–6 ret.
Loss	0–2	Jun 2013	F17 Rochester, US	Futures	Clay	(United States) Dennis Novikov	(United States) Chase Buchanan (Brazil) Fernando Romboli	2–6, 3–6
Win	1–2	Jul 2013	F18 Pittsburgh, US	Futures	Clay	(United States) Connor Smith	(United States) Christopher Mengel (United States) Jason Tahir	6–3, 6–3
Loss	1–3	Jul 2013	F20 Godfrey, US	Futures	Hard	(United States) Devin McCarthy	(United States) Evan King (United States) Peter Kobelt	5–7, 2–6
Win	2–3	Sep 2013	F24 Costa Mesa, US	Futures	Hard	(United States) Mackenzie McDonald	(South Africa) Keith-Patrick Crowley (South Africa) Matt Fawcett	6–3, 6–2
Loss	2–4	Jun 2015	F3 Richmond, Canada	Futures	Hard	(United Kingdom) Farris Fathi Gosea	(United States) Hunter Nicholas (United States) Raymond Sarmiento	3–6, 4–6
Win	3–4	Aug 2015	F6 Saskatoon, Canada	Futures	Hard	(United Kingdom) Farris Fathi Gosea	(United States) Patrick Davidson (Australia) Matt Reid	6–3, 6–2

== Wins over top 10 players ==
- He has a 6–27 record against players who were, at the time the match was played, ranked in the top 10.

Season	2020	2021	2022	2023	2024	2025	Total
Wins	1	0	0	2	1	2	6

#	Player	Rk	Event	Surface	Rd	Score	Rk	Ref
2020
1.	(Italy) Matteo Berrettini	10	Paris Masters, France	Hard (i)	2R	7–6^{(7–3)}, 6–7^{(0–7)}, 7–5	91	
2023
2.	(Denmark) Holger Rune	6	Canadian Open, Canada	Hard	2R	6–2, 4–6, 6–3	70	
3.	(Norway) Casper Ruud	8	Japan Open, Japan	Hard	2R	6–3, 6–4	79	
2024
4.	Andrey Rublev	6	Halle Open, Germany	Grass	1R	6–4, 7–6^{(7–5)}	53	
2025
5.	(Norway) Casper Ruud	5	Indian Wells Open, United States	Hard	2R	7–6^{(7–4)}, 3–6, 6–2	48	
6.	(United States) Taylor Fritz	4	Italian Open, Italy	Clay	2R	7–6^{(7–4)}, 7–6^{(7–3)}	45	
