= Adam Neff =

American tennis player

- Country (sports): United States
- Born: May 30, 2001 (age 25) Bradenton, Florida, United States
- Plays: Right-handed
- College: North Carolina; SMU
- Prize money: $12,285

Singles
- Career record: 0–1 (at ATP Tour level, Grand Slam level, and in Davis Cup)
- Career titles: 0

Doubles
- Career record: 0–2 (at ATP Tour level, Grand Slam level, and in Davis Cup)
- Career titles: 0
- Last updated on: January 22, 2024.

Adam Neff (born May 30, 2001) is an American tennis player.

Neff played college tennis at North Carolina in his freshman year before transferring to SMU.

== Career ==
Neff made his ATP main draw debut at the 2022 Dallas Open after receiving a wildcard into the doubles main draw with Ivan Thamma.

He received a wildcard for his ATP singles debut at the 2024 Dallas Open.
