= 2026 Indiana Hardcourt Championships – Singles =

Singles
- 2026 Indiana Hardcourt Championships

Final
- Champion: (South Africa) Lloyd Harris
- Runner-up: (United States) Andre Ilagan
- Score: 6–2, 7–6^{(8–6)}

Events
Singles	Doubles
- Indiana Hardcourt Championships

This was the first edition of the tournament.

Lloyd Harris won the title after defeating Andre Ilagan 6–2, 7–6^{(8–6)} in the final.

== Seeds ==
1. (Australia) Bernard Tomic (second round, withdrew)
2. (Croatia) Borna Gojo (first round)
3. (Japan) Rei Sakamoto (quarterfinals)
4. (Belgium) Gauthier Onclin (second round)
5. (United Kingdom) Jack Pinnington Jones (semifinals)
6. (Italy) Federico Cinà (first round)
7. (South Africa) Lloyd Harris (champion)
8. (United States) Michael Mmoh (first round)

== Draw ==
Key

- Q = Qualifier
- WC = Wild card
- LL = Lucky loser
- Alt = Alternate
- ITF = ITF entry
- PR = Protected ranking
- SR = Special ranking
- SE = Special exempt
- JE = Junior exempt
- JR = Junior Accelerator Programme entrant
- CO = College Accelerator Programme entrant
- NG = Next Gen Accelerator Program entrant
- w/o = Walkover
- r = Retired
- d = Defaulted

=== Finals ===
Semifinals
(United States) Andre Ilagan	6	6
5	(United Kingdom) Jack Pinnington Jones	2	4
WC	(United States) Daniel Milavsky	7^{8}	3	3
7	(South Africa) Lloyd Harris	6^{6}	6	6

Final
(United States) Andre Ilagan	2	6^{6}
7	(South Africa) Lloyd Harris	6	7^{8}

=== Top half ===
First round
1	(Australia) B Tomic	6^{3}	6	6
Q	(Australia) E Winter	7^{7}	4	3
(United States) Andre Ilagan	2	6	6
WC	(United States) A Martin	6	4	3
Q	(United States) Q Vandecasteele	6	6
Alt	(Jordan) A Shelbayh	4	3
(Australia) T Schoolkate	3	6	7^{7}
6	(Italy) F Cinà	6	4	6^{4}
4	(Belgium) G Onclin	6	3	6
Alt	(United States) T Zink	4	6	3
(Austria) J Schwärzler	3	7^{7}	5
Alt	(Ecuador) A Andrade	6	6^{5}	7
(United States) C Smith	5	7	2
(United Kingdom) F Gill	7	5	6
(Spain) D Jordà Sanchis	4	2
5	(United Kingdom) J Pinnington Jones	6	6

Second round
1	(Australia) B Tomic
(United States) A Ilagan	w/o
Q	(United States) Q Vandecasteele	6	2	4
(Australia) T Schoolkate	2	6	6
4	(Belgium) G Onclin	3	3
Alt	(Ecuador) A Andrade	6	6
(United Kingdom) F Gill	2	0^{r}
5	(United Kingdom) J Pinnington Jones	6	2

Quarterfinals
(United States) A Ilagan	6	2	6
(Australia) T Schoolkate	4	6	1
Alt	(Ecuador) A Andrade	6	5	6^{2}
5	(United Kingdom) J Pinnington Jones	4	7	7^{7}

Semifinals
(United States) A Ilagan	6	6
5	(United Kingdom) J Pinnington Jones	2	4

=== Bottom half ===
First round
8/WC	(United States) M Mmoh	3	5
SE	(Lithuania) E Butvilas	6	7
(France) F Balshaw	7	5	6^{0}
WC	(United States) D Milavsky	5	7	7^{7}
(United Kingdom) L Broady	3	5
Q	(India) D Suresh	6	7
(France) U Blanchet	7^{7}	6^{6}	6^{3}
3	(Japan) R Sakamoto	6^{3}	7^{8}	7^{7}
7	(South Africa) L Harris	7^{7}	6
Q	(United States) A Fenty	6^{2}	1
(United Kingdom) H Searle	5	3
Q	(Netherlands) M Röttgering	7	6
Alt	(United States) S Kozlov	6	5	6
Q	(United States) A Mayo	3	7	2
(United Kingdom) H Wendelken	3	6	6
2	(Croatia) B Gojo	6	3	1

Second round
SE	(Lithuania) E Butvilas	6^{6}	5
WC	(United States) D Milavsky	7^{8}	7
Q	(India) D Suresh	5	3
3	(Japan) R Sakamoto	7	6
7	(South Africa) L Harris	7	6
Q	(Netherlands) M Röttgering	5	4
Alt	(United States) S Kozlov	6	4	1
(United Kingdom) H Wendelken	2	6	6

Quarterfinals
WC	(United States) D Milavsky	6	6
3	(Japan) R Sakamoto	3	3
7	(South Africa) L Harris	5	6	7
(United Kingdom) H Wendelken	7	2	5

Semifinals
WC	(United States) D Milavsky	7^{8}	3	3
7	(South Africa) L Harris	6^{6}	6	6
