= 2026 Indiana Hardcourt Championships =

- Date: August 10–16
- Edition: 1st
- Surface: Hard
- Location: Brownsburg, Indiana, United States

Champions

Singles
- (South Africa) Lloyd Harris

Doubles
- (Ecuador) Gonzalo Escobar / (India) Niki Kaliyanda Poonacha
- Indiana Hardcourt Championships

The 2026 Indiana Hardcourt Championships was a professional tennis tournament played on hardcourts. It was the first edition of the tournament which was part of the 2026 ATP Challenger Tour. It took place in Brownsburg, Indiana, United States between August 10 and 16, 2026.

== Singles main draw entrants ==
=== Seeds ===
Country	Player	Rank^{1}	Seed
AUS	Bernard Tomic	160	1
CRO	Borna Gojo	163	2
JPN	Rei Sakamoto	165	3
BEL	Gauthier Onclin	167	4
GBR	Jack Pinnington Jones	172	5
ITA	Federico Cinà	178	6
RSA	Lloyd Harris	179	7
USA	Michael Mmoh	181	8

- ^{1} Rankings as of August 3, 2026.

=== Other entrants ===
The following players received wildcards into the singles main draw:

- (United States) Andres Martin
- (United States) Daniel Milavsky
- (United States) Michael Mmoh

The following player received entry into the singles main draw as a special exempt:

- (Lithuania) Edas Butvilas

The following players received entry into the singles main draw as alternates:

- (Ecuador) Andy Andrade
- (United States) Stefan Kozlov
- (Jordan) Abdullah Shelbayh
- (United States) Tyler Zink

The following players received entry from the qualifying draw:

- (United States) Andrew Fenty
- (United States) Aidan Mayo
- (Netherlands) Mees Röttgering
- (India) Dhakshineswar Suresh
- (United States) Quinn Vandecasteele
- (Australia) Edward Winter

== Champions ==
=== Singles ===
- (South Africa) Lloyd Harris def. (United States) Andre Ilagan 6–2, 7–6^{(8–6)}.

=== Doubles ===
- (Ecuador) Gonzalo Escobar / (India) Niki Kaliyanda Poonacha def. (United States) Robert Cash / (Netherlands) Bart Stevens 6–4, 6–1.
