= 2025 Winston-Salem Challenger – Doubles =

Doubles
- 2025 Winston-Salem Challenger

Final
- Champions: (United States) Andrew Fenty (United States) Noah Schachter
- Runners-up: (Venezuela) Juan José Bianchi (United States) Daniel Milavsky
- Score: 6–4, 6–4

Events
Singles	Doubles
- Winston-Salem Challenger

This was the first edition of the tournament.

Andrew Fenty and Noah Schachter won the title after defeating Juan José Bianchi and Daniel Milavsky 6–4, 6–4 in the final.

== Seeds ==
1. (United States) George Goldhoff / (United States) Theodore Winegar (first round)
2. (United States) Pranav Kumar / (Australia) Kody Pearson (first round)
3. (Australia) Patrick Harper / (United Kingdom) Johannus Monday (semifinals)
4. (United States) Patrick Maloney / (Venezuela) Luis David Martínez (first round)

== Draw ==
Key

- Q = Qualifier
- WC = Wild card
- LL = Lucky loser
- Alt = Alternate
- ITF = ITF entry
- PR = Protected ranking
- SR = Special ranking
- SE = Special exempt
- JE = Junior exempt
- JR = Junior Accelerator Programme entrant
- CO = College Accelerator Programme entrant
- NG = Next Gen Accelerator Program entrant
- w/o = Walkover
- r = Retired
- d = Defaulted

=== Draw ===
First round
1	(United States) G Goldhoff (United States) T Winegar	6^{1}	7^{7}	[6]
WC	(United States) Andrew Delgado (United States) S Dostanic	7^{7}	6^{4}	[10]
(United States) A Perez (United States) Jamie Vance	3	4
(Venezuela) Juan José Bianchi (United States) D Milavsky	6	6
3	(Australia) P Harper (United Kingdom) J Monday	6	6
(India) Sai Karteek Reddy Ganta (Japan) Ryuki Matsuda	4	3
(Canada) J Boulais (Japan) J Trotter	4	6	[10]
(United Kingdom) S Duncan (United States) G Johns	6	2	[5]
(France) A Ghibaudo (Jordan) A Shelbayh	2	4
WC	(United Kingdom) L Pow (Poland) Kacper Szymkowiak	6	6
(United States) M Damm (United States) A Rybakov	4	6	[10]
4	(United States) Patrick Maloney (Venezuela) LD Martínez	6	4	[6]
(United States) A Fenty (United States) N Schachter	7	6
(Australia) M Bouzige (United States) Andre Ilagan	5	2
(United States) M Krueger (United States) J Sheehy	6	7
2	(United States) P Kumar (Australia) K Pearson	4	5

Quarterfinals
WC	(United States) A Delgado (United States) S Dostanic	4	6	[3]
(Venezuela) JJ Bianchi (United States) D Milavsky	6	3	[10]
3	(Australia) P Harper (United Kingdom) J Monday	6	6
(Canada) J Boulais (Japan) J Trotter	4	4
WC	(United Kingdom) L Pow (Poland) K Szymkowiak	6	3	[12]
(United States) M Damm (United States) A Rybakov	4	6	[10]
(United States) A Fenty (United States) N Schachter	6	6
(United States) M Krueger (United States) J Sheehy	4	2

Semifinals
(Venezuela) JJ Bianchi (United States) D Milavsky	6	7^{7}
3	(Australia) P Harper (United Kingdom) J Monday	2	6^{2}
WC	(United Kingdom) L Pow (Poland) K Szymkowiak	4	2
(United States) A Fenty (United States) N Schachter	6	6

Final
(Venezuela) JJ Bianchi (United States) D Milavsky	4	4
(United States) A Fenty (United States) N Schachter	6	6
