= 2025 Dallas Open – Singles =

Singles
- 2025 Dallas Open

Final
- Champion: (Canada) Denis Shapovalov
- Runner-up: (Norway) Casper Ruud
- Score: 7–6^{(7–5)}, 6–3

Details
- Draw: 32 (4 Q / 3 WC )
- Seeds: 8

Events
Singles	Doubles
- Dallas Open

Denis Shapovalov defeated Casper Ruud in the final, 7–6^{(7–5)}, 6–3 to win the singles tennis title at the 2025 Dallas Open. It was his third ATP Tour title and first ATP 500 title. Shapovalov was the first player to defeat three top 10-ranked opponents en route to an ATP 500 title since Nick Kyrgios at the 2019 Mexican Open and the fourth player overall (after Grigor Dimitrov, Juan Martín del Potro and Kyrgios) with three Top 10 wins in ATP 250 or 500 events (since the current category system was introduced in 2009).

Tommy Paul was the defending champion, but lost in the semifinals to Shapovalov.

== Seeds ==
1. (United States) Taylor Fritz (second round)
2. (Norway) Casper Ruud (final)
3. (United States) Tommy Paul (semifinals)
4. (United States) Ben Shelton (second round)
5. (United States) Frances Tiafoe (second round)
6. (Czech Republic) Tomáš Macháč (quarterfinals)
7. (United States) Alex Michelsen (first round)
8. (Italy) Matteo Arnaldi (quarterfinals)

== Draw ==
Key

- Q = Qualifier
- WC = Wild card
- LL = Lucky loser
- Alt = Alternate
- ITF = ITF entry
- PR = Protected ranking
- SR = Special ranking
- SE = Special exempt
- JE = Junior exempt
- JR = Junior Accelerator Programme entrant
- CO = College Accelerator Programme entrant
- NG = Next Gen Accelerator Program entrant
- w/o = Walkover
- r = Retired
- d = Defaulted

=== Finals ===
Semifinals
(Canada) Denis Shapovalov	7	6
3	(United States) Tommy Paul	5	3
(Spain) Jaume Munar	2	6	6^{4}
2	(Norway) Casper Ruud	6	2	7^{7}

Final
(Canada) Denis Shapovalov	7^{7}	6
2	(Norway) Casper Ruud	6^{5}	3

=== Top half ===
First round
1	(United States) T Fritz	6	6
(France) A Rinderknech	4	2
(Serbia) M Kecmanović	3	7^{7}	3
(Canada) D Shapovalov	6	6^{5}	6
(Australia) R Hijikata	7	6
(France) A Mannarino	5	3
(Japan) K Nishikori	2	2
6	(Czech Republic) T Macháč	6	6
3	(United States) T Paul	6^{6}	6	6
WC	(United States) J Brooksby	7^{8}	3	4
Q	(United States) E Quinn	6	6
WC	(United States) T Svajda	4	2
WC	(United States) R Opelka	7^{7}	6
(Kazakhstan) A Shevchenko	6^{3}	4
(United Kingdom) C Norrie	2	7^{7}	6
7	(United States) A Michelsen	6	6^{1}	1

Second round
1	(United States) T Fritz	6	3	6^{2}
(Canada) D Shapovalov	2	6	7^{7}
(Australia) R Hijikata	4	6^{0}
6	(Czech Republic) T Macháč	6	7^{7}
3	(United States) T Paul	6	5	6
Q	(United States) E Quinn	4	7	4
WC	(United States) R Opelka	4	7^{7}	6
(United Kingdom) C Norrie	6	6^{5}	4

Quarterfinals
(Canada) D Shapovalov	7^{7}	6
6	(Czech Republic) T Macháč	6^{5}	0
3	(United States) T Paul	7^{7}	6
WC	(United States) R Opelka	6^{3}	2

Semifinals
(Canada) D Shapovalov	7	6
3	(United States) T Paul	5	3

=== Bottom half ===
First round
8	(Italy) M Arnaldi	6	6
Q	(United States) C Eubanks	3	4
(Spain) A Davidovich Fokina	6	7
Q	(United States) B Holt	1	5
(Spain) J Munar	7	6
(China) Y Bu	5	2
(Australia) A Vukic	3	3
4	(United States) B Shelton	6	6
5	(United States) F Tiafoe	6	3	6
(Japan) T Daniel	1	6	4
(Japan) Y Nishioka	6	7^{8}
(United States) B Nakashima	4	6^{6}
(Spain) R Carballés Baena	1	6	4
Q	(United States) M Mmoh	6	3	6
LL	(Australia) J Duckworth	5	6	2
2	(Norway) C Ruud	7	4	6

Second round
8	(Italy) M Arnaldi	6	6
(Spain) A Davidovich Fokina	1	3
(Spain) J Munar	6	7^{7}
4	(United States) B Shelton	2	6^{3}
5	(United States) F Tiafoe	6	4	3
(Japan) Y Nishioka	3	6	6
Q	(United States) M Mmoh	1	4
2	(Norway) C Ruud	6	6

Quarterfinals
8	(Italy) M Arnaldi	4	6	3
(Spain) J Munar	6	3	6
(Japan) Y Nishioka	5	2^{r}
2	(Norway) C Ruud	7	3

Semifinals
(Spain) J Munar	2	6	6^{4}
2	(Norway) C Ruud	6	2	7^{7}

== Qualifying ==
=== Seeds ===
1. (Australia) James Duckworth (qualifying competition, lucky loser)
2. (United States) Christopher Eubanks (qualified)
3. (United States) Tristan Boyer (first round)
4. (Argentina) Federico Agustín Gómez (first round)
5. (United States) Mitchell Krueger (first round)
6. (Moldova) Radu Albot (first round)
7. (United States) Ethan Quinn (qualified)
8. (United States) Zachary Svajda (first round)

=== Qualifiers ===
1. (United States) Ethan Quinn
2. (United States) Christopher Eubanks
3. (United States) Michael Mmoh
4. (United States) Brandon Holt

=== Lucky loser ===
1. (Australia) James Duckworth

=== Qualifying draw ===
==== First qualifier ====
First round
1	(Australia) James Duckworth	6	6
WC	(United States) Eric Hadigian	1	1
(Japan) James Trotter	6^{4}	1
7	(United States) Ethan Quinn	7^{7}	6

Qualifying competition
1	(Australia) James Duckworth	6^{4}	5
7	(United States) Ethan Quinn	7^{7}	7

==== Second qualifier ====
First round
2	(United States) Christopher Eubanks	6	7
Alt	(United States) Aidan Mayo	3	5
Alt	(United Kingdom) Jack Pinnington Jones	1	7^{7}	6
8	(United States) Zachary Svajda	6	6^{4}	3

Qualifying competition
2	(United States) Christopher Eubanks	6	6
Alt	(United Kingdom) Jack Pinnington Jones	3	1

==== Third qualifier ====
First round
3	(United States) Tristan Boyer	4	6^{5}
PR	(United States) Michael Mmoh	6	7^{7}
WC	(Bulgaria) Georgi Georgiev	6	3	6
6	(Moldova) Radu Albot	4	6	3

Qualifying competition
PR	(United States) Michael Mmoh	7^{7}	6
WC	(Bulgaria) Georgi Georgiev	6^{3}	3

==== Fourth qualifier ====
First round
4	(Argentina) Federico Agustín Gómez	4	2
WC	(United States) Ryan Seggerman	6	6
(United States) Brandon Holt	1	7^{7}	6
5	(United States) Mitchell Krueger	6	6^{1}	3

Qualifying competition
WC	(United States) Ryan Seggerman	2	3
(United States) Brandon Holt	6	6
