= 2025 Winston-Salem Challenger =

- Date: 8–14 September
- Edition: 1st
- Surface: Hard
- Location: Winston-Salem, North Carolina, United States

Champions

Singles
- (United Kingdom) Jack Pinnington Jones

Doubles
- (United States) Andrew Fenty / (United States) Noah Schachter
Winston-Salem Challenger	· 2026 →

The 2025 Winston-Salem Challenger was a professional tennis tournament played on hardcourts. It was the first edition of the tournament which was part of the 2025 ATP Challenger Tour. It took place in Winston-Salem, North Carolina, United States between 8 and 14 September 2025.

== Singles main-draw entrants ==
=== Seeds ===
Country	Player	Rank^{1}	Seed
ARG	Juan Pablo Ficovich	129	1
USA	Murphy Cassone	180	2
USA	Mitchell Krueger	186	3
GBR	Jack Pinnington Jones	222	4
GBR	Johannus Monday	232	5
USA	Garrett Johns	305	6
USA	Alex Rybakov	314	7
USA	Patrick Maloney	324	8

^{1} Rankings are as of 25 August 2025.

=== Other entrants ===
The following players received wildcards into the singles main draw:

- (United States) Patrick Maloney
- (United Kingdom) Luca Pow
- (United States) Emon van Loben Sels

The following players received entry into the singles main draw using protected rankings:

- (Jamaica) Blaise Bicknell
- (United States) Thai-Son Kwiatkowski
- (Australia) Philip Sekulic

The following player received entry into the singles main draw through the College Accelerator programme:

- (United States) Aidan Kim

The following players received entry from the qualifying draw:

- (United States) Gavin Goode
- (United States) Daniel Milavsky
- (Japan) James Trotter
- (United States) Quinn Vandecasteele
- (United States) Cooper Williams
- (Australia) Edward Winter

== Champions ==
=== Singles ===
- (United Kingdom) Jack Pinnington Jones def. (United States) Trevor Svajda 6–2, 6–2.

=== Doubles ===
- (United States) Andrew Fenty / (United States) Noah Schachter def. (Venezuela) Juan José Bianchi / (United States) Daniel Milavsky 6–4, 6–4.
