= 2026 Odlum Brown Vancouver Open – Men's singles =

Men's singles
- 2026 Odlum Brown Vancouver Open

Final
- Champion: (United States) J. J. Wolf
- Runner-up: (Estonia) Mark Lajal
- Score: 7–5, 6–1

Events
Singles	men	women
Doubles	men	women
- Vancouver Open

Constant Lestienne was the defending champion from when the tournament was last held in 2022 but chose not to defend his title.

J. J. Wolf won the title after defeating Mark Lajal 7–5, 6–1 in the final.

== Seeds ==
1. (France) Benjamin Bonzi (quarterfinals)
2. (Australia) Alexei Popyrin (first round)
3. (Japan) Shintaro Mochizuki (second round)
4. (Spain) Pablo Llamas Ruiz (first round)
5. (United Kingdom) Jacob Fearnley (withdrew)
6. (Australia) Dane Sweeny (second round)
7. (United Kingdom) Toby Samuel (second round)
8. (Estonia) Mark Lajal (final)
9. (China) Zhang Zhizhen (first round)

== Draw ==
Key

- Q = Qualifier
- WC = Wild card
- LL = Lucky loser
- Alt = Alternate
- ITF = ITF entry
- PR = Protected ranking
- SR = Special ranking
- SE = Special exempt
- JE = Junior exempt
- JR = Junior Accelerator Programme entrant
- CO = College Accelerator Programme entrant
- NG = Next Gen Accelerator Program entrant
- w/o = Walkover
- r = Retired
- d = Defaulted

=== Finals ===
Semifinals
Q	(Japan) Jay Friend	3	4
PR	(United States) J. J. Wolf	6	6
WC	(Canada) Keegan Rice	3	2
8	(Estonia) Mark Lajal	6	6

Final
PR	(United States) J. J. Wolf	7	6
8	(Estonia) Mark Lajal	5	1

=== Top half ===
First round
1	(France) B Bonzi	3	6	6
Alt	(Jamaica) B Bicknell	6	3	4
(Chinese Taipei) Y-h Hsu	3	4
(United States) M Mmoh	6	6
(United Kingdom) L Broady	5	7	4
Q	(Japan) J Friend	7	5	6
(United Kingdom) J Pinnington Jones	5	1
7	(United Kingdom) T Samuel	7	6
3	(Japan) S Mochizuki	2	6	6
(United Kingdom) C Broom	6	2	4
Alt	(Japan) Y Watanuki	4	2
LL	(Japan) H Matsuoka	6	6
Q	(Japan) J Trotter	6	1	3
Q	(United States) T Zink	3	6	6
PR	(United States) JJ Wolf	7^{7}	3	6
9	(China) Z Zhang	6^{3}	6	4

Second round
1	(France) B Bonzi	7	6
(United States) M Mmoh	5	4
Q	(Japan) J Friend	6	7
7	(United Kingdom) T Samuel	4	5
3	(Japan) S Mochizuki	3	2
LL	(Japan) H Matsuoka	6	6
Q	(United States) T Zink	3	3
PR	(United States) JJ Wolf	6	6

Quarterfinals
1	(France) B Bonzi	7	6^{7}	5
Q	(Japan) J Friend	5	7^{9}	7
LL	(Japan) H Matsuoka	6	5	3
PR	(United States) JJ Wolf	4	7	6

Semifinals
Q	(Japan) J Friend	3	4
PR	(United States) JJ Wolf	6	6

=== Bottom half ===
First round
6	(Australia) D Sweeny	6	6
WC	(Canada) D Chan	4	1
Q	(United States) D Milavsky	3	6	6
(China) Y Zhou	6	1	3
(United Kingdom) H Wendelken	6
(United States) M Cassone	5^{r}
WC	(Canada) Keegan Rice	6	3	6
4	(Spain) P Llamas Ruiz	4	6	4
8	(Estonia) M Lajal	6	6
Q	(United States) E Zhu	3	2
Alt	(Australia) P Sekulic	2	2
(France) C Chidekh	6	6
(Denmark) A Holmgren	7^{7}	3	3
Q	(United States) B Shick	6^{5}	6	6
(Ecuador) A Andrade	7	3	6
2/WC	(Australia) A Popyrin	5	6	1

Second round
6	(Australia) D Sweeny	3	1
Q	(United States) D Milavsky	6	6
(United Kingdom) H Wendelken	2	6	5
WC	(Canada) K Rice	6	2	7
8	(Estonia) M Lajal	7^{7}	7
(France) C Chidekh	6^{3}	5
Q	(United States) B Shick	6	6
(Ecuador) A Andrade	2	3

Quarterfinals
Q	(United States) D Milavsky	6	1	6^{4}
WC	(Canada) K Rice	1	6	7^{7}
8	(Estonia) M Lajal	6	6
Q	(United States) B Shick	2	2

Semifinals
WC	(Canada) K Rice	3	2
8	(Estonia) M Lajal	6	6
