= 2026 Dallas Open – Singles =

Singles
- 2026 Dallas Open

Final
- Champion: (United States) Ben Shelton
- Runner-up: (United States) Taylor Fritz
- Score: 3–6, 6–3, 7–5

Details
- Draw: 32 (4 Q / 3 WC )
- Seeds: 8

Events
Singles	Doubles
- Dallas Open

Ben Shelton defeated Taylor Fritz in the final, 3–6, 6–3, 7–5 to win the singles tennis title at the 2026 Dallas Open. He saved three championship points en route to his fourth ATP Tour title.

Denis Shapovalov was the defending champion, but lost in the semifinals to Shelton.

== Seeds ==
1. (United States) Taylor Fritz (final)
2. (United States) Ben Shelton (champion)
3. (Spain) Alejandro Davidovich Fokina (quarterfinals)
4. (Italy) Flavio Cobolli (first round)
5. (United States) Tommy Paul (second round)
6. (United States) Learner Tien (first round)
7. (Canada) Denis Shapovalov (semifinals)
8. (United States) Frances Tiafoe (second round)

== Draw ==
Key

- Q = Qualifier
- WC = Wild card
- LL = Lucky loser
- Alt = Alternate
- ITF = ITF entry
- PR = Protected ranking
- SR = Special ranking
- SE = Special exempt
- JE = Junior exempt
- JR = Junior Accelerator Programme entrant
- CO = College Accelerator Programme entrant
- NG = Next Gen Accelerator Program entrant
- w/o = Walkover
- r = Retired
- d = Defaulted

=== Finals ===
Semifinals
1	(United States) Taylor Fritz	7^{7}	7^{7}
(Croatia) Marin Čilić	6^{5}	6^{3}
7	(Canada) Denis Shapovalov	6	4	6^{4}
2	(United States) Ben Shelton	4	6	7^{7}

Final
1	(United States) Taylor Fritz	6	3	5
2	(United States) Ben Shelton	3	6	7

=== Top half ===
First round
1	(United States) T Fritz	6	5	7^{7}
(United States) M Giron	4	7	6^{1}
(United States) B Nakashima	6	6
(Italy) M Bellucci	3	4
WC	(United States) M Zheng	3	4
(United States) S Korda	6	6
(France) T Atmane	6	2	2
8	(United States) F Tiafoe	4	6	6
4	(Italy) F Cobolli	2	2
Q	(United Kingdom) J Pinnington Jones	6	6
(Australia) J Duckworth	2	4
WC	(United States) E Spizzirri	6	6
WC	(United States) T Svajda	6^{3}	5
(United States) E Quinn	7^{7}	7
(Croatia) M Čilić	7	7^{7}
6	(United States) L Tien	5	6^{4}

Second round
1	(United States) T Fritz	6	6
(United States) B Nakashima	3	4
(United States) S Korda	7	6
8	(United States) F Tiafoe	5	1
Q	(United Kingdom) J Pinnington Jones	7^{7}	4	7^{7}
WC	(United States) E Spizzirri	6^{5}	6	6^{4}
(United States) E Quinn	6^{4}	3
(Croatia) M Čilić	7^{7}	6

Quarterfinals
1	(United States) T Fritz	6^{2}	6	7^{7}
(United States) S Korda	7^{7}	4	6^{5}
Q	(United Kingdom) J Pinnington Jones	1	4
(Croatia) M Čilić	6	6

Semifinals
1	(United States) T Fritz	7^{7}	7^{7}
(Croatia) M Čilić	6^{5}	6^{3}

=== Bottom half ===
First round
7	(Canada) D Shapovalov	6	6
Q	(Spain) R Jódar	1	2
(United States) A Kovacevic	6	7^{7}
LL	(United States) P Kypson	4	6^{1}
(Bulgaria) G Dimitrov	7	4	4
(United States) A Michelsen	5	6	6
Q	(United States) Z Svajda	4	6^{1}
3	(Spain) A Davidovich Fokina	6	7^{7}
5	(United States) T Paul	4	6	7^{7}
(United States) J Brooksby	6	4	6^{4}
Q	(Japan) S Shimabukuro	7^{7}	3	6^{3}
(Serbia) M Kecmanović	6^{3}	6	7^{7}
(Australia) A Walton	4	2
(France) A Mannarino	6	6
(Canada) G Diallo	4	4
2	(United States) B Shelton	6	6

Second round
7	(Canada) D Shapovalov	6	6
(United States) A Kovacevic	4	4
(United States) A Michelsen	4	4
3	(Spain) A Davidovich Fokina	6	6
5	(United States) T Paul	7	4	4
(Serbia) M Kecmanović	5	6	6
(France) A Mannarino	6^{2}	7^{7}	3
2	(United States) B Shelton	7^{7}	6^{4}	6

Quarterfinals
7	(Canada) D Shapovalov	5	6	6
3	(Spain) A Davidovich Fokina	7	4	3
(Serbia) M Kecmanović	7	3	4
2	(United States) B Shelton	5	6	6

Semifinals
7	(Canada) D Shapovalov	6	4	6^{4}
2	(United States) B Shelton	4	6	7^{7}

== Qualifying ==
=== Seeds ===
1. (United States) Patrick Kypson (qualifying competition, lucky loser)
2. (United States) Zachary Svajda (qualified)
3. (Spain) Rafael Jódar (qualified)
4. (Japan) Sho Shimabukuro (qualified)
5. (United Kingdom) Jack Pinnington Jones (qualified)
6. (Australia) Bernard Tomic (qualifying competition)
7. (United States) Tristan Boyer (qualifying competition)
8. (United States) Murphy Cassone (qualifying competition)

=== Qualifiers ===
1. (United Kingdom) Jack Pinnington Jones
2. (United States) Zachary Svajda
3. (Spain) Rafael Jódar
4. (Japan) Sho Shimabukuro

=== Lucky loser ===
1. (United States) Patrick Kypson

=== Qualifying draw ===
==== First qualifier ====
First round
1	(United States) Patrick Kypson	6	6
Alt	(Brazil) Pedro Sakamoto	2	1
Alt	(Brazil) Daniel Dutra da Silva	3	1
5	(United Kingdom) Jack Pinnington Jones	6	6

Qualifying competition
1	(United States) Patrick Kypson	6^{4}	7	5
5	(United Kingdom) Jack Pinnington Jones	7^{7}	5	7

==== Second qualifier ====
First round
2	(United States) Zachary Svajda	6	6
WC	(Bulgaria) Georgi Georgiev	3	2
WC	(United States) Alex Finkelstein	4	2
7	(United States) Tristan Boyer	6	6

Qualifying competition
2	(United States) Zachary Svajda	6	5	6
7	(United States) Tristan Boyer	3	7	4

==== Third qualifier ====
First round
3	(Spain) Rafael Jódar	6	6
(United States) Mitchell Krueger	3	2
(United States) Alex Rybakov	2	3
8	(United States) Murphy Cassone	6	6

Qualifying competition
3	(Spain) Rafael Jódar	7^{7}	7^{8}
8	(United States) Murphy Cassone	6^{5}	6^{6}

==== Fourth qualifier ====
First round
4	(Japan) Sho Shimabukuro	6	6
PR	(United States) Thai-Son Kwiatkowski	0	4
WC	(United States) Krish Arora	3	2
6	(Australia) Bernard Tomic	6	6

Qualifying competition
4	(Japan) Sho Shimabukuro	6	6
6	(Australia) Bernard Tomic	3	3
