= 2026 Odlum Brown Vancouver Open =

- Date: 27 July–1 August
- Edition: 16th (men); 19th (women)
- Category: ATP Challenger 125; WTA 125
- Draw: 32S/16D
- Prize money: $225,000
- Surface: Hard
- Location: Vancouver, Canada
- Venue: Hollyburn Country Club

Champions

Men's singles
- (United States) J. J. Wolf

Women's singles
- (Australia) Taylah Preston

Men's doubles
- (United States) Nathaniel Lammons / (United States) Jackson Withrow

Women's doubles
- (United States) Caroline Dolehide / (Canada) Alexandra Vagramov
- Vancouver Open

The 2026 Odlum Brown Vancouver Open was a professional tennis tournament played on outdoor hardcourts. It was the sixteenth edition of the men's event and nineteenth of the women's, which were also part of the 2026 ATP Challenger 125 and the 2026 WTA 125 tournaments respectively. The tournament returned to the tour after a four year absence. It took place in Vancouver, Canada between 27 July and 1 August 2026.

== Men's singles main-draw entrants ==
=== Seeds ===
Country	Player	Rank^{1}	Seed
FRA	Benjamin Bonzi	103	1
AUS	Alexei Popyrin	104	2
JPN	Shintaro Mochizuki	116	3
ESP	Pablo Llamas Ruiz	117	4
~~GBR~~	~~Jacob Fearnley~~	~~121~~	~~5~~
AUS	Dane Sweeny	122	6
GBR	Toby Samuel	127	7
EST	Mark Lajal	150	8
CHN	Zhang Zhizhen	158	9

- ^{1} Rankings are as of July 20, 2026.

=== Other entrants ===
The following players received wildcards into the singles main draw:

- (Canada) Duncan Chan
- (Australia) Alexei Popyrin
- (Canada) Keegan Rice

The following player received entry into the singles main draw using a protected ranking:

- (United States) J. J. Wolf

The following players received entry into the singles main draw as alternates:

- (Jamaica) Blaise Bicknell
- (Australia) Philip Sekulic
- (Japan) Yosuke Watanuki

The following players received entry from the qualifying draw:

- (Japan) Jay Friend
- (United States) Daniel Milavsky
- (United States) Braden Shick
- (Japan) James Trotter
- (United States) Evan Zhu
- (United States) Tyler Zink

The following player received entry as a lucky loser:

- (Japan) Hayato Matsuoka

== Women's singles main-draw entrants ==
=== Seeds ===
Country	Player	Rank^{1}	Seed
JPN	Moyuka Uchijima	110	1
THA	Mananchaya Sawangkaew	116	2
AUS	Taylah Preston	118	3
USA	Kayla Day	126	4
JPN	Himeno Sakatsume	132	5
AUS	Emerson Jones	139	6
GBR	Harriet Dart	143	7
AUS	Maddison Inglis	147	8

- ^{1} Rankings are as of 20 July 2026.

=== Other entrants ===
The following players received wildcards into the singles main draw:

- (Canada) Ariana Arseneault
- (Canada) Teah Chavez
- (Canada) Alexandra Vagramov
- (Canada) Annabelle Xu

The following players received entry into the main draw through protected ranking:

- (Canada) Carol Zhao

The following players received entry from the qualifying draw:

- (Canada) Emma Si Yu Dong
- (Japan) Miho Kuramochi
- (United States) Ellie Schoppe
- (Hong Kong) Cody Wong

=== Withdrawals ===
Before the tournament

- (China) Guo Hanyu → replaced by (China) Lu Jiajing
- (United States) Elizabeth Mandlik → replaced by (Japan) Haruka Kaji
- (France) Kristina Mladenovic → replaced by (Japan) Nao Hibino
- (Thailand) Lanlana Tararudee → replaced by (Australia) Lizette Cabrera
- (China) Zhu Lin → replaced by (Japan) Kyōka Okamura

=== Retirement ===
- (Canada) Emma Si Yu Dong

== Women's doubles main-draw entrants ==
=== Seeds ===
Country	Player	Country	Player	Rank^{†}	Seed
GBR	Harriet Dart	AUS	Priscilla Hon	241	1
USA	Anna Rogers	USA	Allura Zamarripa	265	2
AUS	Alexandra Osborne	HKG	Cody Wong	298	3
CAN	Ariana Arseneault	CAN	Kayla Cross	361	4

† Rankings are as of 20 July 2026

=== Withdrawals ===
During the tournament

- (Canada) Ariana Arseneault / (Canada) Kayla Cross
- (United Kingdom) Harriet Dart / (Australia) Priscilla Hon
- (Canada) Emma Si Yu Dong / (Canada) Annabelle Xu
- (Australia) Maddison Inglis / (Australia) Emerson Jones
- (Slovakia) Martina Okáľová / (United States) Katrina Scott

== Champions ==
=== Men's singles ===
- (United States) J. J. Wolf def. (Estonia) Mark Lajal 7–5, 6–1.

=== Women's singles ===
- (Australia) Taylah Preston def. (Australia) Maddison Inglis 7–6^{(7–5)}, 6–3

=== Men's doubles ===
- (United States) Nathaniel Lammons / (United States) Jackson Withrow def. (United States) Daniel Milavsky / (United States) Braden Shick 7–6^{(9–7)}, 7–6^{(7–1)}.

=== Women's doubles ===
- (United States) Caroline Dolehide / (Canada) Alexandra Vagramov def. (United States) Anna Rogers / (United States) Allura Zamarripa 6–1, 3–6, [10–6]
