= 2025 Winston-Salem Challenger – Singles =

Singles
- 2025 Winston-Salem Challenger

Final
- Champion: (United Kingdom) Jack Pinnington Jones
- Runner-up: (United States) Trevor Svajda
- Score: 6–2, 6–2

Events
Singles	Doubles
- Winston-Salem Challenger

This was the first edition of the tournament.

Jack Pinnington Jones won the title after defeating Trevor Svajda 6–2, 6–2 in the final.

== Seeds ==
1. (Argentina) Juan Pablo Ficovich (first round)
2. (United States) Murphy Cassone (quarterfinals)
3. (United States) Mitchell Krueger (quarterfinals)
4. (United Kingdom) Jack Pinnington Jones (champion)
5. (United Kingdom) Johannus Monday (first round)
6. (United States) Garrett Johns (first round)
7. (United States) Alex Rybakov (second round)
8. (United States) Patrick Maloney (first round)

== Draw ==
Key

- Q = Qualifier
- WC = Wild card
- LL = Lucky loser
- Alt = Alternate
- ITF = ITF entry
- PR = Protected ranking
- SR = Special ranking
- SE = Special exempt
- JE = Junior exempt
- JR = Junior Accelerator Programme entrant
- CO = College Accelerator Programme entrant
- NG = Next Gen Accelerator Program entrant
- w/o = Walkover
- r = Retired
- d = Defaulted

=== Finals ===
Semifinals
(United States) Christian Langmo	3	4
4	(United Kingdom) Jack Pinnington Jones	6	6
(Spain) Rafael Jódar	5	5
(United States) Trevor Svajda	7	7

Final
4	(United Kingdom) Jack Pinnington Jones	6	6
(United States) Trevor Svajda	2	2

=== Top half ===
First round
1	(Argentina) JP Ficovich	4	6	3
(United States) Christian Langmo	6	3	6
(United States) Dar Blanch	6	6
(Jordan) A Shelbayh	3	4
WC	(United States) Emon van Loben Sels	3	7^{10}	3
(United States) M Damm	6	6^{8}	6
(France) A Ghibaudo	6	6
6	(United States) G Johns	3	4
4	(United Kingdom) J Pinnington Jones	6	6
(Australia) M Bouzige	1	4
Q	(United States) Q Vandecasteele	6	6
Q	(Japan) J Trotter	2	4
CO	(United States) Aidan Kim	6	6
(Japan) Ryuki Matsuda	3	4
PR	(Jamaica) B Bicknell	6	5	7
5	(United Kingdom) J Monday	4	7	5

Second round
(United States) C Langmo	3	6	6
(United States) Dar Blanch	6	3	3
(United States) M Damm	6^{5}	3
(France) A Ghibaudo	7^{7}	6
4	(United Kingdom) J Pinnington Jones	6	6
Q	(United States) Q Vandecasteele	3	3
CO	(United States) A Kim	6	1	6
PR	(Jamaica) B Bicknell	1	6	3

Quarterfinals
(United States) C Langmo	6	6
(France) A Ghibaudo	4	4
4	(United Kingdom) J Pinnington Jones	6	6
CO	(United States) A Kim	4	4

Semifinals
(United States) C Langmo	3	4
4	(United Kingdom) J Pinnington Jones	6	6

=== Bottom half ===
First round
8/WC	(United States) Patrick Maloney	2	3
WC	(United Kingdom) L Pow	6	6
(Spain) R Jódar	7	6
Q	(United States) Gavin Goode	5	1
Q	(Australia) E Winter	2	6	6^{6}
(United States) A Perez	6	4	7^{8}
(United States) T Zink	1	2
3	(United States) M Krueger	6	6
7	(United States) A Rybakov	7^{7}	6
PR	(United States) T-S Kwiatkowski	6^{3}	4
(United States) Andre Ilagan	6	1	2
(United States) T Svajda	2	6	6
PR	(Australia) P Sekulic	7^{7}	6
Q	(United States) D Milavsky	6^{2}	4
Q	(United States) C Williams	1	2
2	(United States) M Cassone	6	6

Second round
WC	(United Kingdom) L Pow	3	0^{r}
(Spain) R Jódar	6	1
(United States) A Perez	4	6^{5}
3	(United States) M Krueger	6	7^{7}
7	(United States) A Rybakov	3	3
(United States) T Svajda	6	6
PR	(Australia) P Sekulic	1	4
2	(United States) M Cassone	6	6

Quarterfinals
(Spain) R Jódar	6	6
3	(United States) M Krueger	3	2
(United States) T Svajda	7^{7}	6
2	(United States) M Cassone	6^{3}	2

Semifinals
(Spain) R Jódar	5	5
(United States) T Svajda	7	7
