= 2026 Indiana Hardcourt Championships – Doubles =

Doubles
- 2026 Indiana Hardcourt Championships

Final
- Champions: (Ecuador) Gonzalo Escobar (India) Niki Kaliyanda Poonacha
- Runners-up: (United States) Robert Cash (Netherlands) Bart Stevens
- Score: 6–4, 6–1

Events
Singles	Doubles
- Indiana Hardcourt Championships

This was the first edition of the tournament.

Gonzalo Escobar and Niki Kaliyanda Poonacha won the title after defeating Robert Cash and Bart Stevens 6–4, 6–1 in the final.

== Seeds ==
1. (United States) Rajeev Ram / (United Kingdom) Joe Salisbury (withdrew)
2. (United States) Robert Cash / (Netherlands) Bart Stevens (final)
3. (United States) Evan King / (United States) Reese Stalder (first round)
4. (Chinese Taipei) Ray Ho / Ivan Liutarevich (semifinals)

== Draw ==
Key

- Q = Qualifier
- WC = Wild card
- LL = Lucky loser
- Alt = Alternate
- ITF = ITF entry
- PR = Protected ranking
- SR = Special ranking
- SE = Special exempt
- JE = Junior exempt
- JR = Junior Accelerator Programme entrant
- CO = College Accelerator Programme entrant
- NG = Next Gen Accelerator Program entrant
- w/o = Walkover
- r = Retired
- d = Defaulted

First round
Alt	(United Kingdom) L Broady (United Kingdom) H Wendelken	6^{1}	0^{r}
(United States) N Lammons (United States) J Withrow	7^{7}	0
WC	(United States) Michael Andre (United States) Sam Landau	3	4
(Ecuador) G Escobar (India) N Kaliyanda Poonacha	6	6
3	(United States) E King (United States) R Stalder	6^{5}	6	[8]
(New Zealand) A Rai (New Zealand) J Watt	7^{7}	4	[10]
(India) S Banthia (Bulgaria) A Donski	3	4
(United States) B Kittay (Brazil) F Romboli	6	6
(South Korea) J-s Nam (Finland) P Niklas-Salminen	4	4
(Uruguay) A Behar (United Kingdom) J Paris	6	6
(India) A Chandrasekar (Japan) T Yuzuki	6^{6}	6	[7]
4	(Chinese Taipei) R Ho; I Liutarevich	7^{8}	4	[10]
(Australia) B Bayldon (United States) T Hilderbrand	7^{7}	7
WC	(United States) Boris Kozlov (United States) S Kozlov	6^{2}	5
(United States) D Milavsky (Australia) C Puttergill	4	4
2	(United States) R Cash (Netherlands) B Stevens	6	6

Quarterfinals
(United States) N Lammons (United States) J Withrow	4	4
(Ecuador) G Escobar (India) N Kaliyanda Poonacha	6	6
(New Zealand) A Rai (New Zealand) J Watt	5	6	[10]
(United States) B Kittay (Brazil) F Romboli	7	4	[7]
(Uruguay) A Behar (United Kingdom) J Paris	6^{7}	5
4	(Chinese Taipei) R Ho; I Liutarevich	7^{9}	7
(Australia) B Bayldon (United States) T Hilderbrand	4	4
2	(United States) R Cash (Netherlands) B Stevens	6	6

Semifinals
(Ecuador) G Escobar (India) N Kaliyanda Poonacha	7^{7}	7^{7}
(New Zealand) A Rai (New Zealand) J Watt	6^{4}	6^{2}
4	(Chinese Taipei) R Ho; I Liutarevich	4	4
2	(United States) R Cash (Netherlands) B Stevens	6	6

Final
(Ecuador) G Escobar (India) N Kaliyanda Poonacha	6	6
2	(United States) R Cash (Netherlands) B Stevens	4	1
