= 2026 Winnipeg National Bank Challenger =

- Date: July 20–26
- Edition: 9th
- Category: ATP Challenger Tour
- Surface: Hard
- Location: Winnipeg, Manitoba, Canada

Champions

Singles
- (United Kingdom) Toby Samuel

Doubles
- (United States) Daniel Milavsky / (United States) Braden Shick
- Winnipeg National Bank Challenger

The 2026 Winnipeg National Bank Challenger was a professional tennis tournament played on outdoor hard courts. It was the 9th edition of the tournament and part of the 2026 ATP Challenger Tour. It took place in Winnipeg, Manitoba, Canada between July 20 and 26, 2026.

== Singles main-draw entrants ==
=== Seeds ===
Country	Player	Rank^{1}	Seed
JPN	Shintaro Mochizuki	115	1
GBR	Toby Samuel	129	2
CHN	Zhang Zhizhen	156	3
DEN	August Holmgren	192	4
GBR	Liam Broady	198	5
FRA	Clément Chidekh	207	6
TPE	Hsu Yu-hsiou	210	7
JPN	Rio Noguchi	222	8

- ^{1} Rankings are as of July 13, 2026.

=== Other entrants ===
The following players received wildcards into the singles main draw:

- (Canada) Nicolas Arseneault
- (Canada) Justin Boulais
- (Canada) Keegan Rice

The following player received entry into the singles main draw through the College Accelerator programme:

- (Japan) Jay Friend

The following player received entry into the singles main draw through the Next Gen Accelerator programme:

- (Netherlands) Mees Röttgering

The following players received entry into the singles main draw as alternates:

- (Japan) Hayato Matsuoka
- (Japan) Yuta Shimizu

The following players received entry from the qualifying draw:

- (Canada) Mikael Arseneault
- (Canada) Duncan Chan
- (United Kingdom) Millen Hurrion
- (United States) Garrett Johns
- (United States) Daniel Milavsky
- (Japan) James Trotter

The following player received entry as a lucky loser:

- (Australia) Edward Winter

== Champions ==
=== Singles ===
- (United Kingdom) Toby Samuel def. (Canada) Liam Draxl 6–4, 6–2.

=== Doubles ===
- (United States) Daniel Milavsky / (United States) Braden Shick def. (United States) Joshua Sheehy / (United States) Tyler Zink 6–3, 3–6, [10–7].
