= 2025 Dallas Open – Doubles =

Doubles
- 2025 Dallas Open

Final
- Champions: (United States) Christian Harrison (United States) Evan King
- Runners-up: (Uruguay) Ariel Behar (United States) Robert Galloway
- Score: 7–6^{(7–4)}, 7–6^{(7–4)}

Events
Singles	Doubles
← 2024 ·	Dallas Open	· 2026 →

Qualifiers Christian Harrison and Evan King defeated Ariel Behar and Robert Galloway in the final, 7–6^{(7–4)}, 7–6^{(7–4)} to win the doubles tennis title at the 2025 Dallas Open. It was the first ATP Tour title for both players.

Max Purcell and Jordan Thompson were the reigning champions, but did not participate this year.

== Seeds ==
1. (United States) Nathaniel Lammons / (United States) Jackson Withrow (first round)
2. (United Kingdom) Joe Salisbury / (United Kingdom) Neal Skupski (first round)
3. (United Kingdom) Jamie Murray / (Australia) John Peers (semifinals)
4. (United States) Austin Krajicek / (United States) Rajeev Ram (quarterfinals)

== Draw ==
=== Key ===
- Q = Qualifier
- WC = Wild card
- LL = Lucky loser
- Alt = Alternate
- SE = Special exempt
- PR = Protected ranking
- ITF = ITF entry
- JE = Junior exempt
- w/o = Walkover
- r = Retired
- d = Defaulted
- SR = Special ranking

=== Draw ===
First round
1	(United States) N Lammons (United States) J Withrow	6^{7}	4
(Uruguay) A Behar (United States) R Galloway	7^{9}	6
(Australia) R Hijikata (United States) A Michelsen	6	3	[10]
(United States) B Shelton (Argentina) H Zeballos	4	6	[7]
4	(United States) A Krajicek (United States) R Ram	7^{7}	5	[10]
(Colombia) N Barrientos (India) RC Bollipalli	6^{6}	7	[6]
WC	(United States) R Cash (United States) JJ Tracy	6	7^{7}
(Mexico) S González (Austria) L Miedler	3	6^{4}
(Netherlands) S Arends (United Kingdom) L Johnson	6	5	[10]
(Austria) A Erler (Germany) C Frantzen	3	7	[8]
WC	(United States) M Krueger (United States) E Quinn	2	4
3	(United Kingdom) J Murray (Australia) J Peers	6	6
(Brazil) R Matos (Brazil) M Melo	7^{7}	7^{7}
(Italy) M Arnaldi (United States) B Nakashima	6^{4}	6^{2}
Q	(United States) C Harrison (United States) E King	6	6
2	(United Kingdom) J Salisbury (United Kingdom) N Skupski	4	4

Quarterfinals
(Uruguay) A Behar (United States) R Galloway	6	6
(Australia) R Hijikata (United States) A Michelsen	2	3
4	(United States) A Krajicek (United States) R Ram	3	6	[5]
WC	(United States) R Cash (United States) JJ Tracy	6	3	[10]
(Netherlands) S Arends (United Kingdom) L Johnson	6	6^{9}	[6]
3	(United Kingdom) J Murray (Australia) J Peers	4	7^{11}	[10]
(Brazil) R Matos (Brazil) M Melo	4	3
Q	(United States) C Harrison (United States) E King	6	6

Semifinals
(Uruguay) A Behar (United States) R Galloway	7	3	[10]
WC	(United States) R Cash (United States) JJ Tracy	5	6	[5]
3	(United Kingdom) J Murray (Australia) J Peers	4	2
Q	(United States) C Harrison (United States) E King	6	6

Final
(Uruguay) A Behar (United States) R Galloway	6^{4}	6^{4}
Q	(United States) C Harrison (United States) E King	7^{7}	7^{7}

== Qualifying ==
=== Seeds ===
1. (United States) Ryan Seggerman / (Australia) John-Patrick Smith (qualifying competition)
2. (United States) Christian Harrison / (United States) Evan King (qualified)

=== Qualifiers ===
1. (United States) Christian Harrison / (United States) Evan King

=== Qualifying draw ===
First round
1	(United States) Ryan Seggerman (Australia) John-Patrick Smith	6	6
Alt	(Moldova) Radu Albot (Japan) Taro Daniel	2	4
WC	(Mexico) Hans Hach Verdugo (Japan) James Trotter	5	3
2	(United States) Christian Harrison (United States) Evan King	7	6

Qualifying competition
1	(United States) Ryan Seggerman (Australia) John-Patrick Smith	3	2
2	(United States) Christian Harrison (United States) Evan King	6	6
