= 2026 Odlum Brown Vancouver Open – Women's singles =

Women's singles
- 2026 Odlum Brown Vancouver Open

Final
- Champion: (Australia) Taylah Preston
- Runner-up: (Australia) Maddison Inglis
- Score: 7–6^{(7–5)}, 6–3

Details
- Draw: 32 (4Q / 4WC)
- Seeds: 8

Events
Singles	men	women
Doubles	men	women
- Odlum Brown Vancouver Open

Taylah Preston won the title, defeating Maddison Inglis 7–6^{(7–5)}, 6–3, in the final.

Valentini Grammatikopoulou was the defending champion from when the tournament was last held in 2022, but chose not to compete.

== Seeds ==
1. (Japan) Moyuka Uchijima (quarterfinals)
2. (Thailand) Mananchaya Sawangkaew (semifinals)
3. (Australia) Taylah Preston (champion)
4. (United States) Kayla Day (first round)
5. (Japan) Himeno Sakatsume (quarterfinals)
6. (Australia) Emerson Jones (quarterfinals)
7. (United Kingdom) Harriet Dart (quarterfinals)
8. (Australia) Maddison Inglis (final)

== Draw ==
Key

- Q = Qualifier
- WC = Wild card
- LL = Lucky loser
- Alt = Alternate
- ITF = ITF entry
- PR = Protected ranking
- SR = Special ranking
- SE = Special exempt
- JE = Junior exempt
- JR = Junior Accelerator Programme entrant
- CO = College Accelerator Programme entrant
- NG = Next Gen Accelerator Program entrant
- w/o = Walkover
- r = Retired
- d = Defaulted

=== Finals ===
Semifinals
8	(Australia) Maddison Inglis	6	6
(Japan) Mai Hontama	3	4
3	(Australia) Taylah Preston	5	6	6
2	(Thailand) Mananchaya Sawangkaew	7	3	3

Final
8	(Australia) Maddison Inglis	6^{5}	3
3	(Australia) Taylah Preston	7^{7}	6

=== Top half ===
First round
1	(Japan) M Uchijima	6	6
Q	(Japan) M Kuramochi	1	4
(Japan) H Kinoshita	6	6
(Japan) K Okamura	1	4
(Australia) L Cabrera	2	2
(Belgium) S Costoulas	6	6
(Belgium) G Minnen	1	3
8	(Australia) M Inglis	6	6
4	(United States) K Day	7^{7}	3	4
(Japan) M Hontama	6^{3}	6	6
(China) Jia Lu	7	6
(United States) C Dolehide	5	4
WC	(Canada) A Arseneault	6	7^{7}
WC	(Canada) A Xu	4	6^{3}
Q	(Hong Kong) C Wong	6	3	5
5	(Japan) H Sakatsume	2	6	7

Second round
1	(Japan) M Uchijima	2	6	7
(Japan) H Kinoshita	6	4	5
(Belgium) S Costoulas	3	3
8	(Australia) M Inglis	6	6
(Japan) M Hontama	6	6
(China) Jia Lu	3	3
WC	(Canada) A Arseneault	6^{5}	2
5	(Japan) H Sakatsume	7^{7}	6

Quarterfinals
1	(Japan) M Uchijima	4	7^{11}	3
8	(Australia) M Inglis	6	6^{9}	6
(Japan) M Hontama	6	6
5	(Japan) H Sakatsume	2	2

Semifinals
8	(Australia) M Inglis	6	6
(Japan) M Hontama	3	4

=== Bottom half ===
First round
7	(United Kingdom) H Dart	6	6
(Canada) K Cross	2	1
(South Korea) Y-w Ku	6	2	6^{6}
Q	(Canada) E Dong	4	6	7^{8}
(Australia) P Hon	6	6
Q	(United States) E Schoppe	3	4
(Japan) H Kaji	0	2
3	(Australia) T Preston	6	6
6	(Australia) E Jones	6	4	6
PR	(Canada) C Zhao	3	6	4
(United States) M Brengle	6	4	6
WC	(Canada) A Vagramov	4	6	2
WC	(Canada) T Chavez	1	2
(Japan) N Hibino	6	6
(Chinese Taipei) E-s Liang	2	4
2	(Thailand) M Sawangkaew	6	6

Second round
7	(United Kingdom) H Dart	6	3	3
Q	(Canada) E Dong	0	6	0^{r}
(Australia) P Hon	6^{3}	4
3	(Australia) T Preston	7^{7}	6
6	(Australia) E Jones	4	6	6
(United States) M Brengle	6	0	2
(Japan) N Hibino	1	6	2
2	(Thailand) M Sawangkaew	6	3	6

Quarterfinals
7	(United Kingdom) H Dart	3	3
3	(Australia) T Preston	6	6
6	(Australia) E Jones	3	2
2	(Thailand) M Sawangkaew	6	6

Semifinals
3	(Australia) T Preston	5	6	6
2	(Thailand) M Sawangkaew	7	3	3

== Qualifying ==
=== Seeds ===
1. (United States) Katrina Scott (qualifying competition)
2. (Japan) Miho Kuramochi (qualified)
3. (China) Wei Sijia (qualifying competition)
4. (Japan) Ena Shibahara (first round)
5. (Slovakia) Martina Okáľová (first round)
6. (Canada) Ana Grubor (first round)
7. Valeria Savinykh (qualifying competition)
8. (Hong Kong) Cody Wong (qualified)

=== Qualifiers ===
1. (United States) Ellie Schoppe
2. (Japan) Miho Kuramochi
3. (Hong Kong) Cody Wong
4. (Canada) Emma Dong

=== Draw ===
==== First qualifier ====
First round
1	(United States) Katrina Scott	6	6
(Mexico) Sabastiani León	1	1
(United States) Ellie Schoppe	6^{5}	7	6
6	(Canada) Ana Grubor	7^{7}	5	2

Qualifying competition
1	(United States) Katrina Scott	6^{5}	6^{7}
(United States) Ellie Schoppe	7^{7}	7^{9}

==== Second qualifier ====
First round
2	(Japan) Miho Kuramochi	7^{7}	6
(Japan) Hiroko Kuwata	6^{2}	4
(Canada) Avery Alexander	6	4	7^{7}
5	(Slovakia) Martina Okáľová	4	6	6^{5}

Qualifying competition
2	(Japan) Miho Kuramochi	7	6
(Canada) Avery Alexander	5	3

==== Third qualifier ====
First round
3	(China) Wei Sijia	6	6
WC	(Canada) Havana Kadi	0	1
(Canada) Dasha Plekhanova	2	6^{1}
8	(Hong Kong) Cody Wong	6	7^{7}

Qualifying competition
3	(China) Wei Sijia	7	3	1
8	(Hong Kong) Cody Wong	5	6	6

==== Fourth qualifier ====
First round
4	(Japan) Ena Shibahara	2	6	4
WC	(Canada) Emma Dong	6	1	6
(Canada) Mia Kupres	4	0
7	Valeria Savinykh	6	6

Qualifying competition
WC	(Canada) Emma Dong	6	6
7	Valeria Savinykh	3	2
