= 2026 Winnipeg National Bank Challenger – Singles =

Singles
- 2026 Winnipeg National Bank Challenger

Final
- Champion: (United Kingdom) Toby Samuel
- Runner-up: (Canada) Liam Draxl
- Score: 6–4, 6–2

Events
Singles	Doubles
- Winnipeg National Bank Challenger

Liam Draxl was the defending champion but lost in the final to Toby Samuel.

Samuel won the title after defeating Draxl 6–4, 6–2 in the final.

== Seeds ==
1. (Japan) Shintaro Mochizuki (semifinals)
2. (United Kingdom) Toby Samuel (champion)
3. (China) Zhang Zhizhen (second round)
4. (Denmark) August Holmgren (second round)
5. (United Kingdom) Liam Broady (first round)
6. (France) Clément Chidekh (quarterfinals)
7. (Chinese Taipei) Hsu Yu-hsiou (quarterfinals)
8. (Japan) Rio Noguchi (quarterfinals)

== Draw ==
Key

- Q = Qualifier
- WC = Wild card
- LL = Lucky loser
- Alt = Alternate
- ITF = ITF entry
- PR = Protected ranking
- SR = Special ranking
- SE = Special exempt
- JE = Junior exempt
- JR = Junior Accelerator Programme entrant
- CO = College Accelerator Programme entrant
- NG = Next Gen Accelerator Program entrant
- w/o = Walkover
- r = Retired
- d = Defaulted

=== Finals ===
Semifinals
1	(Japan) Shintaro Mochizuki	0	3
(Canada) Liam Draxl	6	6
(United Kingdom) Charles Broom	6^{4}	2
2	(United Kingdom) Toby Samuel	7^{7}	6

Final
(Canada) Liam Draxl	4	2
2	(United Kingdom) Toby Samuel	6	6

=== Top half ===
First round
1	(Japan) S Mochizuki	6	4	6
(Australia) P Sekulic	3	6	1
(Australia) J McCabe	6^{5}	6	5
Q	(Canada) D Chan	7^{7}	4	7
WC	(Canada) J Boulais	7	2	5
(United Kingdom) J Monday	5	6	7
Alt	(Japan) Y Shimizu	6	7
5	(United Kingdom) L Broady	2	5
4	(Denmark) A Holmgren	6^{8}	6	7^{7}
Q	(United States) G Johns	7^{10}	2	6^{4}
Q	(United Kingdom) Millen Hurrion	0	0
(Canada) L Draxl	6	6
Alt	(Japan) H Matsuoka	6	6
Q	(United States) D Milavsky	2	4
Q	(Japan) J Trotter	1	2
6	(France) C Chidekh	6	6

Second round
1	(Japan) S Mochizuki	6	2	6
Q	(Canada) D Chan	2	6	4
(United Kingdom) J Monday	4	6	6
Alt	(Japan) Y Shimizu	6	3	3
4	(Denmark) A Holmgren	5	6	4
(Canada) L Draxl	7	1	6
Alt	(Japan) H Matsuoka	3	6^{4}
6	(France) C Chidekh	6	7^{7}

Quarterfinals
1	(Japan) S Mochizuki	6	7^{7}
(United Kingdom) J Monday	4	6^{4}
(Canada) L Draxl	7^{8}	6
6	(France) C Chidekh	6^{6}	4

Semifinals
1	(Japan) S Mochizuki	0	3
(Canada) L Draxl	6	6

=== Bottom half ===
First round
8	(Japan) R Noguchi	5	6	6
(United States) B Shick	7	3	2
WC	(Canada) N Arseneault	3	6^{6}
WC	(Canada) Keegan Rice	6	7^{8}
LL	(Australia) E Winter	6	3	2
(United Kingdom) C Broom	2	6	6
(United States) T Zink	6^{1}	3
3	(China) Z Zhang	7^{7}	6
7	(Chinese Taipei) Y-h Hsu	6	6
CO	(Japan) J Friend	3	4
(China) F Sun	4	4
NG	(Netherlands) M Röttgering	6	6
(Japan) Y Watanuki	7^{7}	7
(United States) Andre Ilagan	6^{3}	5
Q	(Canada) Mikael Arseneault	2	0
2	(United Kingdom) T Samuel	6	6

Second round
8	(Japan) R Noguchi	3	6	6
WC	(Canada) K Rice	6	4	0
(United Kingdom) C Broom	2	7^{10}	6
3	(China) Z Zhang	6	6^{8}	2
7	(Chinese Taipei) Y-h Hsu	6	6
NG	(Netherlands) M Röttgering	3	3
(Japan) Y Watanuki	0	1
2	(United Kingdom) T Samuel	6	6

Quarterfinals
8	(Japan) R Noguchi	2	4
(United Kingdom) C Broom	6	6
7	(Chinese Taipei) Y-h Hsu	3	6^{5}
2	(United Kingdom) T Samuel	6	7^{7}

Semifinals
(United Kingdom) C Broom	6^{4}	2
2	(United Kingdom) T Samuel	7^{7}	6
