= 2026 Dallas Open – Doubles =

Doubles
- 2026 Dallas Open

Final
- Champions: (France) Théo Arribagé (France) Albano Olivetti
- Runners-up: (Spain) Marcel Granollers (Argentina) Horacio Zeballos
- Score: 6–3, 7–6^{(7–4)}

Events
Singles	Doubles
- Dallas Open

Théo Arribagé and Albano Olivetti defeated Marcel Granollers and Horacio Zeballos in the final, 6–3, 7–6^{(7–4)} to win the doubles tennis title at the 2026 Dallas Open.

Christian Harrison and Evan King were the reigning champions, but chose not to compete together this year. Harrison partnered Neal Skupski, but lost in the quarterfinals to Arribagé and Olivetti. King partnered John Peers, but lost in the semifinals to Arribagé and Olivetti.

== Seeds ==
1. (Spain) Marcel Granollers / (Argentina) Horacio Zeballos (final)
2. (United States) Christian Harrison / (United Kingdom) Neal Skupski (quarterfinals)
3. (France) Sadio Doumbia / (France) Fabien Reboul (semifinals)
4. (United States) Robert Cash / (United States) JJ Tracy (first round)

== Draw ==
Key

- Q = Qualifier
- WC = Wild card
- LL = Lucky loser
- Alt = Alternate
- ITF = ITF entry
- PR = Protected ranking
- SR = Special ranking
- SE = Special exempt
- JE = Junior exempt
- JR = Junior Accelerator Programme entrant
- CO = College Accelerator Programme entrant
- NG = Next Gen Accelerator Program entrant
- w/o = Walkover
- r = Retired
- d = Defaulted

=== Draw ===
First round
1	(Spain) M Granollers (Argentina) H Zeballos	6	6
(United States) A Krajicek (Croatia) N Mektić	4	2
(Germany) C Frantzen (Netherlands) R Haase	6	6^{3}	[10]
WC	(Canada) D Chan (France) C Rolland de Ravel	4	7^{7}	[7]
3	(France) S Doumbia (France) F Reboul	6	6
Q	(United States) T Hilderbrand (United States) M Kiger	2	3
WC	(Bulgaria) G Dimitrov (Bulgaria) G Georgiev	7	6^{5}	[3]
(United States) A Kovacevic (United States) B Shelton	5	7^{7}	[10]
(United States) A Michelsen (United States) R Ram	4	6	[7]
(Austria) A Erler (United States) R Galloway	6	3	[10]
(United States) E King (Australia) J Peers	7^{7}	3	[11]
4	(United States) R Cash (United States) JJ Tracy	6^{1}	6	[9]
(Czech Republic) A Pavlásek (Australia) J-P Smith	7^{12}	3	[8]
(France) T Arribagé (France) A Olivetti	6^{10}	6	[10]
(Italy) F Cobolli (Spain) A Davidovich Fokina	3	3
2	(United States) C Harrison (United Kingdom) N Skupski	6	6

Quarterfinals
1	(Spain) M Granollers (Argentina) H Zeballos	6	7^{7}
(Germany) C Frantzen (Netherlands) R Haase	4	6^{4}
3	(France) S Doumbia (France) F Reboul	3	6	[11]
(United States) A Kovacevic (United States) B Shelton	6	3	[9]
(Austria) A Erler (United States) R Galloway	4	4
(United States) E King (Australia) J Peers	6	6
(France) T Arribagé (France) A Olivetti	3	7^{7}	[11]
2	(United States) C Harrison (United Kingdom) N Skupski	6	6^{5}	[9]

Semifinals
1	(Spain) M Granollers (Argentina) H Zeballos	4	6	[10]
3	(France) S Doumbia (France) F Reboul	6	1	[7]
(United States) E King (Australia) J Peers	6^{5}	4
(France) T Arribagé (France) A Olivetti	7^{7}	6

Final
1	(Spain) M Granollers (Argentina) H Zeballos	3	6^{4}
(France) T Arribagé (France) A Olivetti	6	7^{7}

== Qualifying ==
=== Seeds ===
1. (United States) Ryan Seggerman / (United States) Patrik Trhac (first round)
2. (United Kingdom) Joshua Paris / (United Kingdom) Marcus Willis (first round)

=== Qualifiers ===
1. (United States) Trey Hilderbrand / (United States) Mac Kiger

=== Qualifying draw ===
First round
1	(United States) Ryan Seggerman (United States) Patrik Trhac	3	4
(United States) Trey Hilderbrand (United States) Mac Kiger	6	6
WC	(United States) Nathaniel Lammons (United States) Jackson Withrow	6	6^{9}	[10]
2	(United Kingdom) Joshua Paris (United Kingdom) Marcus Willis	3	7^{11}	[6]

Qualifying competition
(United States) Trey Hilderbrand (United States) Mac Kiger	6^{5}	6	[10]
WC	(United States) Nathaniel Lammons (United States) Jackson Withrow	7^{7}	4	[8]
