= Winston-Salem Challenger =

- 2025 Winston-Salem Challenger

ATP Challenger Tour
- Location: Winston-Salem, North Carolina, United States
- Category: ATP Challenger Tour
- Surface: Hard
- Prize money: $100,000

The Winston-Salem Challenger is a professional tennis tournament played on hardcourts. It is currently part of the ATP Challenger Tour. It was first held in Winston-Salem, North Carolina, United States in 2025.

== Past finals ==
=== Singles ===
Year	Champion	Runner-up	Score
2025	(United Kingdom) Jack Pinnington Jones	(United States) Trevor Svajda	6–2, 6–2

=== Doubles ===
Year	Champions	Runners-up	Score
2025	(United States) Andrew Fenty (United States) Noah Schachter	(Venezuela) Juan José Bianchi (United States) Daniel Milavsky	6–4, 6–4
