= 2026 Odlum Brown Vancouver Open – Women's doubles =

Women's doubles
- 2026 Odlum Brown Vancouver Open

Final
- Champion: (United States) Caroline Dolehide (Canada) Alexandra Vagramov
- Runner-up: (United States) Anna Rogers (United States) Allura Zamarripa
- Score: 6–1, 3–6, [10–6]

Details
- Draw: 16
- Seeds: 4

Events
Singles	men	women
Doubles	men	women
- Odlum Brown Vancouver Open

Miyu Kato and Asia Muhammad were the reigning champions, but Muhammad chose not to compete and Kato chose to play in Washington instead.

Caroline Dolehide and Alexandra Vagramov won the title, defeating Anna Rogers and Allura Zamarripa 6–1, 3–6, [10–6] in the final.

== Seeds ==
1. (United Kingdom) Harriet Dart / (Australia) Priscilla Hon (semifinals, withdrew)
2. (United States) Anna Rogers / (United States) Allura Zamarripa (final)
3. (Australia) Alexandra Osborne / (Hong Kong) Cody Wong (first round)
4. (Canada) Ariana Arseneault / (Canada) Kayla Cross (semifinals, withdrew)

== Draw ==
Key

- Q = Qualifier
- WC = Wild card
- LL = Lucky loser
- Alt = Alternate
- ITF = ITF entry
- PR = Protected ranking
- SR = Special ranking
- SE = Special exempt
- JE = Junior exempt
- JR = Junior Accelerator Programme entrant
- CO = College Accelerator Programme entrant
- NG = Next Gen Accelerator Program entrant
- w/o = Walkover
- r = Retired
- d = Defaulted

First round
(Slovakia) M Okáľová (United States) K Scott
(Canada) E Dong (Canada) A Xu	w/o
3	(Australia) A Osborne (Hong Kong) C Wong	6^{5}	2
(United States) C Dolehide (Canada) A Vagramov	7^{7}	6
(China) Jia Lu; V Savinykh	6	4	[10]
(Mexico) S León (United States) E Schoppe	4	6	[12]
(Australia) L Cabrera (Japan) H Kuwata	6	4	[4]
(Japan) H Kinoshita (Japan) H Sakatsume	4	6	[10]
(Australia) M Inglis (Australia) E Jones
4	(Canada) A Arseneault (Canada) K Cross	w/o
(Canada) A Alexander (Canada) A Grubor	5	3
(Canada) M Kupres (Canada) R Lacasse	7	6

Quarterfinals
1	(United Kingdom) H Dart (Australia) P Hon	w/o
(Canada) E Dong (Canada) A Xu
(United States) C Dolehide (Canada) A Vagramov	6	6
(Mexico) S León (United States) E Schoppe	2	1
(Japan) H Kinoshita (Japan) H Sakatsume	1	1
4	(Canada) A Arseneault (Canada) K Cross	6	6
(Canada) M Kupres (Canada) R Lacasse	2	6	[7]
2	(United States) A Rogers (United States) A Zamarripa	6	4	[10]

Semifinals
1	(United Kingdom) H Dart (Australia) P Hon
(United States) C Dolehide (Canada) A Vagramov	w/o
4	(Canada) A Arseneault (Canada) K Cross
2	(United States) A Rogers (United States) A Zamarripa	w/o

Final
(United States) C Dolehide (Canada) A Vagramov	6	3	[10]
2	(United States) A Rogers (United States) A Zamarripa	1	6	[6]
