= 2026 Winnipeg National Bank Challenger – Doubles =

Doubles
- 2026 Winnipeg National Bank Challenger

Final
- Champions: (United States) Daniel Milavsky (United States) Braden Shick
- Runners-up: (United States) Joshua Sheehy (United States) Tyler Zink
- Score: 6–3, 3–6, [10–7]

Events
Singles	Doubles
- Winnipeg National Bank Challenger

Keshav Chopra and Andres Martin were the defending champions but chose not to defend their title.

Daniel Milavsky and Braden Shick won the title after defeating Joshua Sheehy and Tyler Zink 6–3, 3–6, [10–7] in the final.

== Seeds ==
1. (Chinese Taipei) Hsu Yu-hsiou / (Japan) Seita Watanabe (quarterfinals)
2. (Australia) Ethan Cook / (Brazil) Bruno Oliveira (quarterfinals)
3. (United States) Alafia Ayeni / (Venezuela) Juan José Bianchi (quarterfinals)
4. (United Kingdom) Charles Broom / (United Kingdom) Ben Jones (first round)

== Draw ==
Key

- Q = Qualifier
- WC = Wild card
- LL = Lucky loser
- Alt = Alternate
- ITF = ITF entry
- PR = Protected ranking
- SR = Special ranking
- SE = Special exempt
- JE = Junior exempt
- JR = Junior Accelerator Programme entrant
- CO = College Accelerator Programme entrant
- NG = Next Gen Accelerator Program entrant
- w/o = Walkover
- r = Retired
- d = Defaulted

First round
1	(Chinese Taipei) Y-h Hsu (Japan) S Watanabe	6	6
(United States) Andre Ilagan (Australia) P Sekulic	4	1
Alt	(Canada) J Boulais (Canada) D Chan	6^{4}	6^{4}
(United States) D Milavsky (United States) B Shick	7^{7}	7^{7}
4	(United Kingdom) C Broom (United Kingdom) B Jones	6	6^{3}	[6]
(United Kingdom) L Broady (India) S Myneni	4	7^{7}	[10]
Alt	(Australia) Enzo Aguiard (Australia) Pavle Marinkov	2	2
(Australia) T Fancutt (New Zealand) A Rai	6	6
(United States) J Sheehy (United States) T Zink	6	7^{7}
(United States) Zachary Fuchs (United States) Wally Thayne	2	6^{5}
(Japan) J Friend (Japan) K Isomura	6^{3}	6	[9]
3	(United States) A Ayeni (Venezuela) Juan José Bianchi	7^{7}	3	[11]
WC	(Canada) Mikael Arseneault (Canada) N Arseneault	2	6	[2]
(Australia) K Pearson (Japan) J Trotter	6	4	[10]
(Japan) H Matsuoka (Japan) S Mochizuki	6	4	[7]
2	(Australia) Ethan Cook (Brazil) Bruno Oliveira	2	6	[10]

Quarterfinals
1	(Chinese Taipei) Y-h Hsu (Japan) S Watanabe	6	6^{9}	[7]
(United States) D Milavsky (United States) B Shick	4	7^{11}	[10]
(United Kingdom) L Broady (India) S Myneni	7^{7}	3	[8]
(Australia) T Fancutt (New Zealand) A Rai	6^{0}	6	[10]
(United States) J Sheehy (United States) T Zink	6	6^{4}	[10]
3	(United States) A Ayeni (Venezuela) JJ Bianchi	4	7^{7}	[5]
(Australia) K Pearson (Japan) J Trotter	6	6
2	(Australia) E Cook (Brazil) B Oliveira	4	2

Semifinals
(United States) D Milavsky (United States) B Shick	6	6
(Australia) T Fancutt (New Zealand) A Rai	3	4
(United States) J Sheehy (United States) T Zink	6	6
(Australia) K Pearson (Japan) J Trotter	3	3

Final
(United States) D Milavsky (United States) B Shick	6	3	[10]
(United States) J Sheehy (United States) T Zink	3	6	[7]
