= 2026 Odlum Brown Vancouver Open – Men's doubles =

Men's doubles
- 2026 Odlum Brown Vancouver Open

Final
- Champions: (United States) Nathaniel Lammons (United States) Jackson Withrow
- Runners-up: (United States) Daniel Milavsky (United States) Braden Shick
- Score: 7–6^{(9–7)}, 7–6^{(7–1)}

Events
Singles	men	women
Doubles	men	women
- Vancouver Open

André Göransson and Ben McLachlan were the defending champions but chose not to defend their title.

Nathaniel Lammons and Jackson Withrow won the title after defeating Daniel Milavsky and Braden Shick 7–6^{(9–7)}, 7–6^{(7–1)} in the final.

== Seeds ==
1. (United States) George Goldhoff / (Canada) Cleeve Harper (first round)
2. (United States) Nathaniel Lammons / (United States) Jackson Withrow (champions)
3. (Australia) Patrick Harper / (United States) Trey Hilderbrand (first round)
4. (Chinese Taipei) Jason Jung / (Antigua and Barbuda) Jody Maginley (semifinals)

== Draw ==
Key

- Q = Qualifier
- WC = Wild card
- LL = Lucky loser
- Alt = Alternate
- ITF = ITF entry
- PR = Protected ranking
- SR = Special ranking
- SE = Special exempt
- JE = Junior exempt
- JR = Junior Accelerator Programme entrant
- CO = College Accelerator Programme entrant
- NG = Next Gen Accelerator Program entrant
- w/o = Walkover
- r = Retired
- d = Defaulted

First round
1	(United States) G Goldhoff (Canada) C Harper	6^{1}	6^{5}
(United States) D Milavsky (United States) B Shick	7^{7}	7^{7}
WC	(Canada) Mikael Arseneault (Canada) N Arseneault	4	6^{3}
(United Kingdom) L Broady (United Kingdom) H Wendelken	6	7^{7}
4	(Chinese Taipei) J Jung (Antigua and Barbuda) J Maginley	7	6
WC	(Canada) D Chan (Canada) Benjamin Thomas George	5	1
(New Zealand) A Rai (United States) J Sheehy	7^{7}	6
PR	(Australia) B Bayldon (India) S Myneni	6^{5}	3
(Ecuador) A Andrade (United States) T Zink
(France) C Chidekh (France) H Grenier	w/o
(Chinese Taipei) Y-h Hsu (Japan) S Watanabe	6	7
3	(Australia) P Harper (United States) T Hilderbrand	4	5
PR	(Mexico) H Hach Verdugo (Venezuela) LD Martínez	5	6	[12]
(Brazil) Bruno Oliveira (Australia) K Pearson	7	4	[10]
(United States) K Poling (Australia) C Puttergill	3	4
2	(United States) N Lammons (United States) J Withrow	6	6

Quarterfinals
(United States) D Milavsky (United States) B Shick	6	6
(United Kingdom) L Broady (United Kingdom) H Wendelken	3	1
4	(Chinese Taipei) J Jung (Antigua and Barbuda) J Maginley	7	7^{7}
(New Zealand) A Rai (United States) J Sheehy	5	6^{5}
(France) C Chidekh (France) H Grenier	2	2
(Chinese Taipei) Y-h Hsu (Japan) S Watanabe	6	6
PR	(Mexico) H Hach Verdugo (Venezuela) LD Martínez	3	6^{4}
2	(United States) N Lammons (United States) J Withrow	6	7^{7}

Semifinals
(United States) D Milavsky (United States) B Shick	4	7	[10]
4	(Chinese Taipei) J Jung (Antigua and Barbuda) J Maginley	6	5	[4]
(Chinese Taipei) Y-h Hsu (Japan) S Watanabe	3	6	[3]
2	(United States) N Lammons (United States) J Withrow	6	3	[10]

Final
(United States) D Milavsky (United States) B Shick	6^{7}	6^{1}
2	(United States) N Lammons (United States) J Withrow	7^{9}	7^{7}
