= 2025 Dallas Open =

- Date: February 3–9, 2025
- Edition: 4th
- Category: ATP Tour 500
- Draw: 28S / 16D
- Surface: Hard (indoor)
- Location: Frisco, United States (billed as Dallas)
- Venue: Ford Center at The Star

Champions

Singles
- (Canada) Denis Shapovalov

Doubles
- (United States) Christian Harrison / (United States) Evan King
- Dallas Open

The 2025 Dallas Open was a men's tennis tournament to be played on indoor hardcourts. It was the 4th edition of the Dallas Open, and part of the ATP Tour 500 series (upgraded from ATP Tour 250 status in previous years) on the 2025 ATP Tour, held February 3–9, 2025. It was held at the Ford Center at The Star in Frisco, Texas, a change from previous years due to additional seating required following the upgrade.

== Finals ==
=== Singles ===
- (Canada) Denis Shapovalov def. (Norway) Casper Ruud, 7–6^{(7–5)}, 6–3

=== Doubles ===
- (United States) Christian Harrison / (United States) Evan King def. (Uruguay) Ariel Behar / (United States) Robert Galloway, 7–6^{(7–4)}, 7–6^{(7–4)}

== Singles main draw entrants ==
=== Seeds ===
| Country | Player | Ranking^{1} | Seed |
|---|---|---|---|
| USA | Taylor Fritz | 4 | 1 |
| NOR | Casper Ruud | 5 | 2 |
| USA | Tommy Paul | 9 | 3 |
| USA | Ben Shelton | 14 | 4 |
| USA | Frances Tiafoe | 18 | 5 |
| CZE | Tomáš Macháč | 25 | 6 |
| USA | Alex Michelsen | 36 | 7 |
| ITA | Matteo Arnaldi | 40 | 8 |

- ^{1} Rankings are as of January 27, 2025.

=== Other entrants ===
The following players received wildcards into the main draw:

- (United States) Jenson Brooksby
- (United States) Reilly Opelka
- (United States) Trevor Svajda

The following players received entry from the qualifying draw:

- (United States) Christopher Eubanks
- (United States) Brandon Holt
- (United States) Michael Mmoh
- (United States) Ethan Quinn

The following player received entry as a lucky loser:

- (Australia) James Duckworth

=== Withdrawals ===
From main draw

- (United States) Marcos Giron → replaced by (Australia) James Duckworth

From entry list using protected ranking and received wildcard

- (United States) Jenson Brooksby → replaced by (Japan) Kei Nishikori
- (United States) Reilly Opelka → replaced by (Australia) Rinky Hijikata

== Doubles main draw entrants ==
=== Seeds ===
| Country | Player | Country | Player | Rank^{1} | Seed |
|---|---|---|---|---|---|
| USA | Nathaniel Lammons | USA | Jackson Withrow | 34 | 1 |
| GBR | Joe Salisbury | GBR | Neal Skupski | 59 | 2 |
| GBR | Jamie Murray | AUS | John Peers | 61 | 3 |
| USA | Austin Krajicek | USA | Rajeev Ram | 72 | 4 |

- ^{1} Rankings as of January 27, 2025.

=== Other entrants ===
The following pairs received wildcards into the doubles main draw:

- (United States) Robert Cash / (United States) JJ Tracy
- (United States) Mitchell Krueger / (United States) Ethan Quinn

The following pair received entry from the qualifying draw:

- (United States) Christian Harrison / (United States) Evan King

=== Withdrawals ===
- (Colombia) Nicolás Barrientos / (Kazakhstan) Aleksandr Nedovyesov → replaced by (Colombia) Nicolás Barrientos / (India) Rithvik Choudary Bollipalli
- (Finland) Harri Heliövaara / (United Kingdom) Henry Patten → replaced by (Australia) Rinky Hijikata / (United States) Alex Michelsen

== Sponsorship ==
Partners of the 2025 event included Dallas Cowboys, Choctaw Casinos & Resorts, Emirates, Polestar, and Hugo Boss as official apparel partner.
