= 2026 Dallas Open =

- Date: February 9–15, 2026
- Edition: 5th
- Category: ATP Tour 500
- Draw: 28S / 16D
- Surface: Hard (indoor)
- Location: Frisco, United States (billed as Dallas)
- Venue: Ford Center at The Star

Champions

Singles
- (United States) Ben Shelton

Doubles
- (France) Théo Arribagé / (France) Albano Olivetti
- Dallas Open

The 2026 Dallas Open (currently called the Nexo Dallas Open for sponsorship reasons) was a men's tennis tournament played on indoor hardcourts. It was the fifth edition of the Dallas Open, and part of the ATP Tour 500 series on the 2026 ATP Tour. The event was held at the Ford Center at The Star in the city of Frisco, Texas, United States, February 9–15, 2026.

== Finals ==
=== Singles ===
- (United States) Ben Shelton def. (United States) Taylor Fritz, 3–6, 6–3, 7–5

=== Doubles ===
- (France) Théo Arribagé / (France) Albano Olivetti def. (Spain) Marcel Granollers / (Argentina) Horacio Zeballos, 6–3, 7–6^{(7–4)}

== Singles main draw entrants ==
=== Seeds ===
Country	Player	Ranking^{1}	Seed
USA	Taylor Fritz	7	1
USA	Ben Shelton	9	2
ESP	Alejandro Davidovich Fokina	15	3
ITA	Flavio Cobolli	20	4
USA	Tommy Paul	22	5
USA	Learner Tien	24	6
CAN	Denis Shapovalov	25	7
USA	Frances Tiafoe	30	8

- ^{1} Rankings are as of February 2, 2026.

=== Other entrants ===
The following players received wildcards into the main draw:

- (United States) Eliot Spizzirri
- (United States) Trevor Svajda
- (United States) Michael Zheng

The following players received entry from the qualifying draw:

- (Spain) Rafael Jódar
- (United Kingdom) Jack Pinnington Jones
- (Japan) Sho Shimabukuro
- (United States) Zachary Svajda

The following player received entry as a lucky loser:

- (United States) Patrick Kypson

=== Withdrawals ===
- (Italy) Matteo Arnaldi → replaced by (United States) Ethan Quinn
- (France) Corentin Moutet → replaced by (Italy) Mattia Bellucci
- (United States) Reilly Opelka → replaced by (United States) Patrick Kypson (LL)
- (Norway) Casper Ruud → replaced by (Australia) Adam Walton

== Doubles main draw entrants ==
=== Seeds ===
Country	Player	Country	Player	Rank^{1}	Seed
ESP	Marcel Granollers	ARG	Horacio Zeballos	9	1
USA	Christian Harrison	GBR	Neal Skupski	12	2
FRA	Sadio Doumbia	FRA	Fabien Reboul	54	3
USA	Robert Cash	USA	JJ Tracy	66	4

- ^{1} Rankings as of February 2, 2026.

=== Other entrants ===
The following pairs received wildcards into the doubles main draw:

- (Canada) Duncan Chan / (France) Cosme Rolland de Ravel
- (Bulgaria) Grigor Dimitrov / (Bulgaria) Georgi Georgiev

The following pair received entry from the qualifying draw:

- (United States) Trey Hilderbrand / (United States) Mac Kiger

== Sponsorship ==
Starting in 2026, the cryptocurrency company Nexo became the tournament's first title sponsor. The Choctaw Casinos & Resorts is the tournament's casino partner. Cîroc was the official vodka.
