= Indiana Hardcourt Championships =

- 2026 Indiana Hardcourt Championships

ATP Challenger Tour
- Location: Brownsburg, Indiana, United States
- Category: ATP Challenger Tour
- Surface: Hard
- Website: Website

The Indiana Hardcourt Championships is a professional tennis tournament played on hardcourts. It is currently part of the ATP Challenger Tour. It was first held in Brownsburg, Indiana, United States in 2026.

== Past finals ==
=== Singles ===
Year	Champion	Runner-up	Score
2026	(South Africa) Lloyd Harris	(United States) Andre Ilagan	6–2, 7–6^{(8–6)}

=== Doubles ===
Year	Champions	Runners-up	Score
2026	(Ecuador) Gonzalo Escobar (India) Niki Kaliyanda Poonacha	(United States) Robert Cash (Netherlands) Bart Stevens	6–4, 6–1
