= Alexandra Vagramov =

Canadian tennis player (born 2001)

- Full name: Alexandra Elena Vagramov
- Country (sports): Canada
- Residence: Vancouver, British Columbia
- Born: June 1, 2001 (age 25) New Westminster, British Columbia
- Plays: Left (two-handed backhand)
- College: UCLA Bruins (2019-2024)
- Prize money: $48,027

Singles
- Career record: 65–65
- Career titles: 0
- Highest ranking: No. 574 (July 13, 2026)
- Current ranking: No. 733 (November 9, 2026)

Doubles
- Career record: 64–37
- Career titles: 1 WTA 125
- Highest ranking: No. 210 (November 9, 2026)
- Current ranking: No. 210 (November 9, 2026)
- Last updated on: November 9, 2026.

Alexandra "Sasha" Vagramov (born June 1, 2001) is a Canadian tennis player. She has a career-high doubles ranking by the WTA of No. 210, achieved on November 9, 2026.

She plays college tennis for the UCLA Bruins.

== Early life ==
Vagramov was born in New Westminster, Canada, in 2001. Her parents emigrated from Soviet Union. She started playing tennis with her family and friends at the age of seven; at the same time, she was also interested in figure skating and rhythmic gymnastics. She loved playing tennis and decided to continue with it.

== Career ==
Partnering Darja Vidmanova, Vagramov won the 2025 Championnats de Granby, defeating Saki Imamura and Wakana Sonobe in the final. She won the first professional championship of her career.

In March 2026, ITF W15 event held in Victoriaville, Canada, she reached the singles final and won the doubles title.

In August 2026, Vagramov won her maiden WTA 125 title in doubles at the Vancouver Open, teaming up with Caroline Dolehide to defeat Anna Rogers and Allura Zamarripa in the final.

== WTA 125 finals ==
=== Doubles: 1 (title) ===
Result	W–L	Date	Tournament	Surface	Partner	Opponents	Score
Win	1–0	Aug 2026	Vancouver Open, Canada	Hard	(United States) Caroline Dolehide	(United States) Anna Rogers (United States) Allura Zamarripa	6–1, 3–6, [10–6]

== ITF Circuit finals ==
=== Singles: 2 (2 runner-ups) ===
Legend W35 tournaments W15 tournaments (0–2)	Finals by surface Hard (0–1) Clay (0–1)

Result	W–L	Date	Tournament	Tier	Surface	Opponent	Score
Loss	0–1	Aug 2025	ITF Telavi, Georgia	W15	Clay	(Switzerland) Katerina Tsygourova	7–6^{(5)}, 1–6, 5–7
Loss	0–2	Mar 2026	ITF Victoriaville, Canada	W15	Hard	(United Kingdom) Esther Adeshina	4–6, 6–4, 2–6

=== Doubles: 15 (5 titles, 10 runner-ups) ===
Legend W75 tournaments (1–1) W50 tournaments (0–3) W35 tournaments (1–2) W15 tournaments (3–4)	Finals by surface Hard (5–9) Clay (0–1)

Result	W–L	Date	Tournament	Tier	Surface	Partner	Opponents	Score
Win	1–0	Jul 2025	Championnats de Granby, Canada	W75	Hard	(Czech Republic) Darja Vidmanova	(Japan) Saki Imamura (Japan) Wakana Sonobe	7–6^{(5)}, 6–3
Loss	1–1	Aug 2025	Saskatoon Challenger, Canada	W50	Hard	(Canada) Raphaëlle Lacasse	(Japan) Saki Imamura (Japan) Hiroko Kuwata	6–7^{(3)}, 6–3, [1–10]
Win	2–1	Oct 2025	ITF Quebec City, Canada	W35	Hard (i)	(Canada) Raphaëlle Lacasse	(Japan) Haruna Arakawa (Japan) Natsuho Arakawa	6–3, 6–2
Loss	2–2	Nov 2025	ITF Chihuahua, Mexico	W50	Hard	(Mexico) Fernanda Navarro	(Canada) Ariana Arseneault (Canada) Raphaëlle Lacasse	6–2, 6–7^{(4)}, [6–10]
Win	3–2	Mar 2026	ITF Trois-Rivières, Canada	W15	Hard	(United States) Dasha Ivanova	(United Kingdom) Esther Adeshina (Canada) Ariana Arseneault	6–3, 3–6, [10–2]
Win	4–2	Mar 2026	ITF Victoriaville, Canada	W15	Hard	(United Kingdom) Esther Adeshina	(United States) Jaedan Brown (United Kingdom) Sofia Johnson	6–3, 6–3
Loss	4–3	May 2026	ITF Boca Raton, United States	W35	Clay	(United States) Dasha Ivanova	(United States) Capucine Jauffret (United States) Annika Penickova	1–6, 2–6
Loss	4–4	Jun 2026	ITF Los Angeles, United States	W15	Hard	(United States) Salma Ewing	(United States) Capucine Jauffret (United States) Kristina Penickova	6–4, 2–6, [8–10]
Loss	4–5	Jun 2026	ITF San Diego, United States	W15	Hard	(United States) Salma Ewing	(United States) Anne Christine Lutkemeyer (Ukraine) Anita Sahdiieva	1–6, 3–6
Loss	4–6	Jul 2026	Championnats de Granby, Canada	W75	Hard	(Canada) Mia Kupres	(United States) Kylie Collins (United States) Olivia Lincer	2–6, 2–6
Loss	4–7	Aug 2026	ITF Monastir, Tunisia	W15	Hard	(Finland) Clarissa Blomqvist	(Japan) Riko Kikawada (New Zealand) Elyse Tse	6–7^{(5)}, 4–6
Win	5–7	Aug 2026	ITF Monastir, Tunisia	W15	Hard	(Finland) Clarissa Blomqvist	(United States) Carolyn Ansari (United Kingdom) Savannah Dada-Mascoll	7–6^{(5)}, 6–2
Loss	5–8	Sep 2026	ITF Monastir, Tunisia	W15	Hard	(Turkey) Doga Turkmen	(United Kingdom) Savannah Dada-Mascoll (Kazakhstan) Yekeratina Dmitrichenko	4–6, 7–6^{(4)}, [8–10]
Loss	5–9	Oct 2026	ITF Austin, United States	W50	Hard	(United States) Ashley Lahey	(United States) Kylie Collins (United Kingdom) Ella McDonald	0–6, 1–6
Loss	5–10	Oct 2026	ITF Norman, United States	W35	Hard	(United States) Ashley Lahey	Evialina Laskevich; Edda Mamedova	6–4, 4–6, [8–10]
