= Noah Schachter =

American tennis player (born 1999)

- Country (sports): United States
- Born: September 6, 1999 (age 27) Steilacoom, United States
- Height: 1.88 m (6 ft 2 in)
- Plays: Right-handed (two-handed backhand)
- College: Texas A&M
- Prize money: US $73,222

Singles
- Career record: 0–0 (at ATP Tour level, Grand Slam level, and in Davis Cup)
- Career titles: 0 ITF
- Highest ranking: No. 654 (March 31, 2025)
- Current ranking: No. 1,085 (October 19, 2026)

Doubles
- Career record: 0–0 (at ATP Tour level, Grand Slam level, and in Davis Cup)
- Career titles: 1 Challenger, 11 ITF
- Highest ranking: No. 248 (February 24, 2025)
- Current ranking: No. 631 (October 19, 2026)
- Last updated on: October 19, 2026.

Noah Schachter (born September 6, 1999) is an American tennis player. He has a career high ATP singles ranking of No. 654 achieved on March 31, 2025 and a career high ATP doubles ranking of No. 248 achieved on February 24, 2025.

Schachter has won one ATP Challenger doubles title at the 2025 Winston-Salem Challenger.

Schachter played college tennis at Texas A&M.
