= Trevor Svajda =

American tennis player (born 2006)

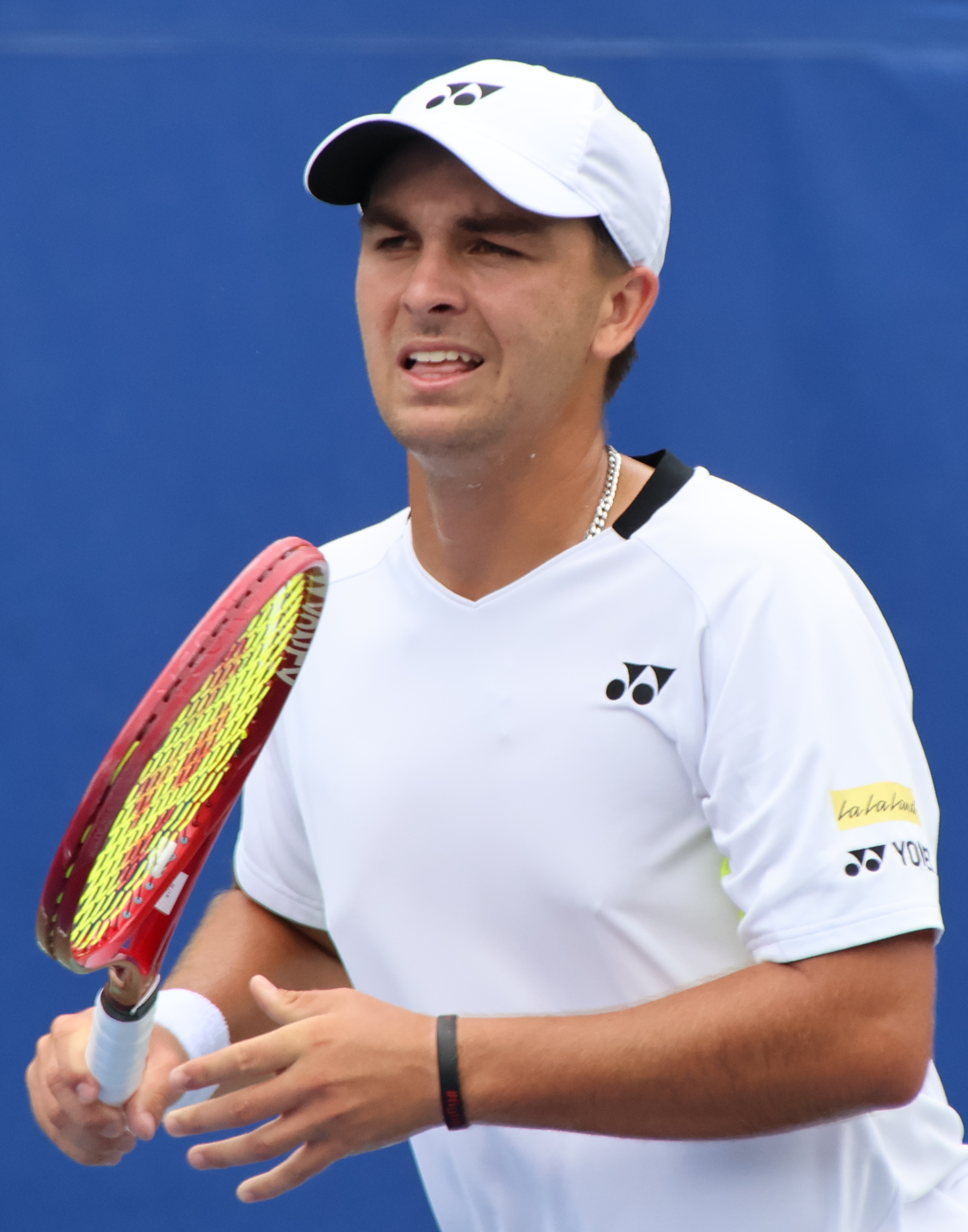
- Svajda in 2026
- Country (sports): United States
- Residence: San Diego, California, US
- Born: April 20, 2006 (age 20) La Jolla, California, US
- Height: 5 ft 9 in (1.75 m)
- Plays: Right-handed (two-handed backhand)
- College: SMU
- Coach: Matt Hanlin
- Prize money: US $176,785

Singles
- Career record: 0–3 (at ATP Tour level, Grand Slam level, and in Davis Cup)
- Career titles: 0
- Highest ranking: No. 358 (February 23, 2026)
- Current ranking: No. 400 (August 31, 2026)

Grand Slam singles results
- US Open: Q1 (2023, 2026)

Doubles
- Career record: 0–0 (at ATP Tour level, Grand Slam level, and in Davis Cup)
- Career titles: 0
- Highest ranking: No. 1,016 (April 13, 2026)
- Current ranking: No. 1,343 (August 31, 2026)
- Last updated on: September 1, 2026.

Trevor Svajda (born April 20, 2006) is an American professional tennis player. He has a career-high ATP singles ranking of No. 358 achieved on February 23, 2026 and a doubles ranking of No. 1,016 reached on April 13, 2026.

== Early life ==
From San Diego, Trevor Svajda is the brother of tennis player Zachary Svajda. He is coached by his godfather, Matt Hanlin.

== College ==
Svajda attends Southern Methodist University where he was a runner-up in the 2025 NCAA Singles Championship.

== Career ==
In 2023, after reaching the final of the USTA Boys' 18s National Championships, Svajda won a wildcard into the 2023 US Open qualifying competition, but was defeated by James Duckworth in the first round. Also competing in the boys' singles at Flushing Meadow, he defeated Wimbledon boys' singles champion Henry Searle and reached the third round. That year, he earned his first ATP ranking point at the USTA SoCal Pro Series event at the University of San Diego.

In February 2025, Svajda was awarded a wildcard into the singles main draw of the 2025 Dallas Open, for his ATP Tour debut.

== Performance timeline ==
Key
W	F	SF	QF	#R	RR	Q#	DNQ	A	NH

(W) winner; (F) finalist; (SF) semifinalist; (QF) quarterfinalist; (#R) rounds 4, 3, 2, 1; (RR) round-robin stage; (Q#) qualification round; (DNQ) did not qualify; (A) absent; (NH) not held; (SR) strike rate (events won / competed); (W–L) win–loss record.

=== Singles ===
Tournament	2023	2024	2025	SR	W–L	Win%
Grand Slam tournaments
Australian Open	A	A	A	0 / 0	0–0	–
French Open	A	A	A	0 / 0	0–0	–
Wimbledon	A	A	A	0 / 0	0–0	–
US Open	Q1	A	A	0 / 0	0–0	–
Win–loss	0–0	0–0	0–0	0 / 0	0–0	–
ATP Masters 1000
Indian Wells Masters	A	A	Q1	0 / 0	0–0	–
Miami Open	A	A	A	0 / 0	0–0	–
Monte Carlo Masters	A	A	A	0 / 0	0–0	–
Madrid Open	A	A	A	0 / 0	0-0	–
Italian Open	A	A	A	0 / 0	0–0	–
Canadian Open	A	A	A	0 / 0	0–0	–
Cincinnati Masters	A	A	A	0 / 0	0–0	–
Shanghai Masters	A	A	A	0 / 0	0–0	–
Paris Masters	A	A	A	0 / 0	0–0	–
Win–loss	0–0	0–0	0–0	0 / 0	0–0	–

== ATP Challenger and ITF Tour finals ==
=== Singles: 4 (3 titles, 1 runner-up) ===
Legend ATP Challenger Tour (0–1) ITF WTT (3–0)	Finals by surface Hard (3–1) Clay (–)

Result	W–L	Date	Tournament	Tier	Surface	Opponent	Score
Loss	0–1	Sep 2025	Winston-Salem Challenger, US	Challenger	Hard	(United Kingdom) Jack Pinnington Jones	2–6, 2–6

Result	W–L	Date	Tournament	Tier	Surface	Opponent	Score
Win	1–0	Mar 2024	M25 Calabasas, US	WTT	Hard	(United States) Nishesh Basavareddy	6–4, 6–1
Win	2–0	Jun 2025	M15 San Diego, US	WTT	Hard	(Netherlands) Stian Klaassen	6–2, 6–3
Win	3–0	Jun 2025	M15 Lakewood, US	WTT	Hard	(United States) Spencer Johnson	6–4, 6–4

=== Doubles: 2 (1 title, 1 runner-up) ===
Legend ATP Challenger Tour (–) ITF WTT (1–1)

Result	W–L	Date	Tournament	Tier	Surface	Partner	Opponents	Score
Loss	0–1	Jun 2024	M15 Rancho Santa Fe, US	WTT	Hard	(United States) Adam Neff	(United States) Patrick Maloney (Australia) Joshua Charlton	6–7^{(5–7)}, 4–6
Win	1–1	Jun 2025	M15 Lakewood, US	WTT	Hard	(United States) Kyle Kang	(United States) Jamie Vance (United States) Alfredo Perez	4–6, 6–3, [10–4]
