= Jack Pinnington Jones =

English tennis player (born 2003)

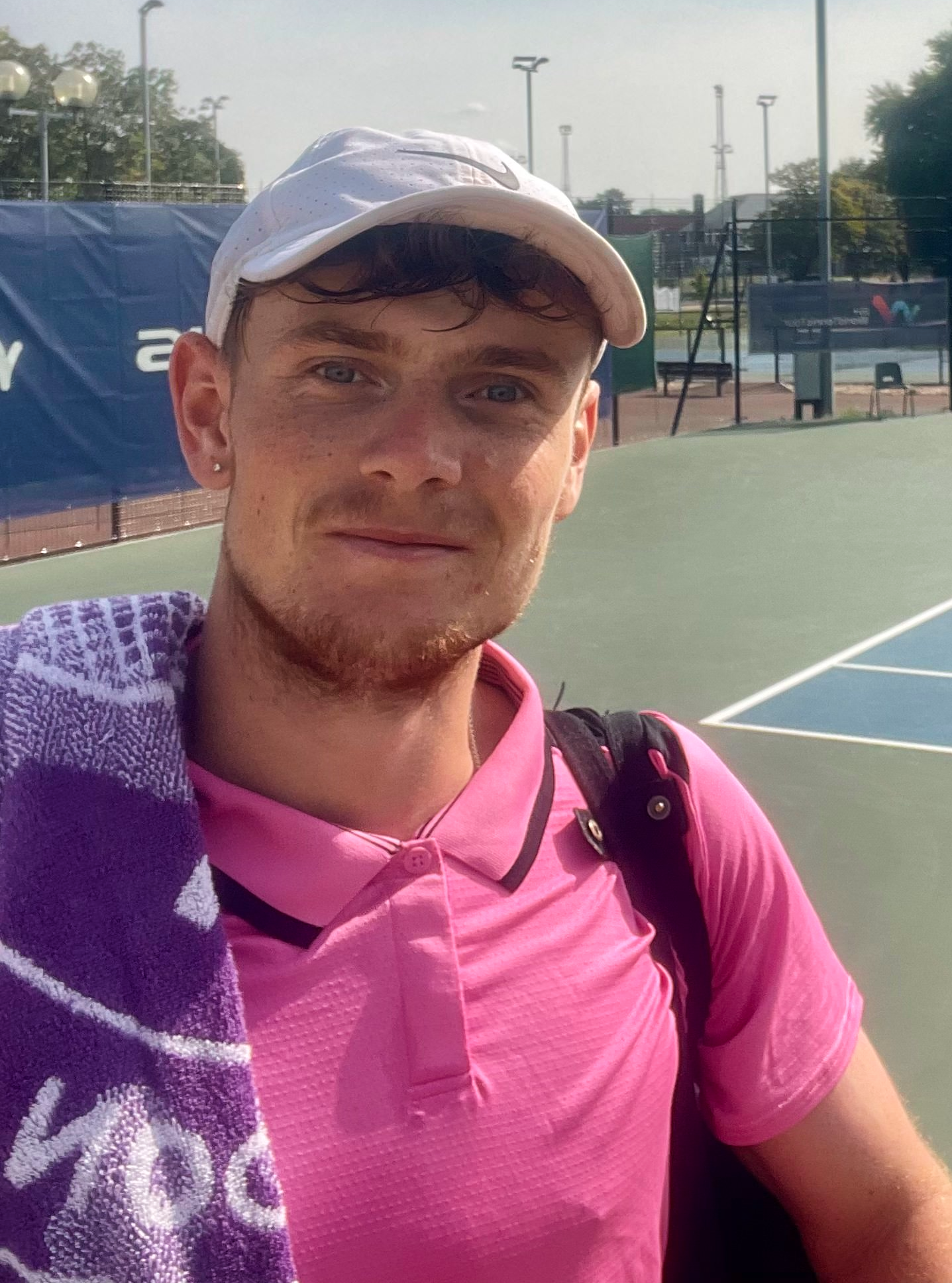
- Country (sports): (United Kingdom) Great Britain
- Born: 30 March 2003 (age 23) Kingston upon Thames, England, UK
- Height: 1.83 m (6 ft 0 in)
- Plays: Right-handed, two handed backhand
- College: TCU
- Coach: Morgan Phillips; David Felgate
- Prize money: US $681,911

Singles
- Career record: 3–4
- Career titles: 2 Challenger
- Highest ranking: No. 132 (18 May 2026)
- Current ranking: No. 165 (24 August 2026)

Grand Slam singles results
- Australian Open: Q1 (2026)
- French Open: Q1 (2026)
- Wimbledon: 2R (2025)
- US Open: Q2 (2026)

Doubles
- Career record: 0–1
- Highest ranking: No. 966 (17 March 2025)
- Current ranking: No. 1,440 (18 May 2026)

Grand Slam doubles results
- Wimbledon: 1R (2024)
- Last updated on: 18 June 2026.

Jack Pinnington Jones (born 30 March 2003) is a British professional tennis player. He has a career-high singles ranking of No. 132 achieved on 18 May 2026 and a doubles ranking of No. 966 achieved on 17 March 2025. He is the current British No. 6 in singles. He has won five titles on the ITF Men's World Tennis Tour and one title on the ATP Challenger Tour.

== Early life ==
Pinnington Jones attended Bournemouth Collegiate School where he was a regular training partner of fellow future-pro Toby Samuel. He later attended Texas Christian University in the United States, completing his junior year before pursuing professional tennis.

== Career ==
=== 2021: First Pro title ===
In 2021 he became the top ranked British junior and seventh-ranked junior in the world.

Given a wildcard into qualifying for the 2021 Wimbledon Championships – Men's singles qualifying when he was 18 years-old, Pinnington Jones overcame a deficit of 983 ranking places to win 6-4 6-3 against Brazilian Joao Menezes in the first round. He also reached the quarterfinals of the 2021 Wimbledon boys' singles tournament.

He won his first professional tournament in October 2021 in Antalya on the ITF World Tennis Tour, only dropping two sets in his six matches on the way to the title.

=== 2024: Major debut at Wimbledon in doubles ===
He was awarded a wildcard alongside Aidan McHugh into the doubles main draw at the 2024 Nottingham Open. He also entered the qualifying for the singles and knocked out Ryan Peniston and Felix Gill to reach the main draw. He then beat Arthur Fery before overcoming British No. 1 player Cameron Norrie, in three sets, to reach the quarterfinals.

In June 2024, on his Major debut, he was awarded a wildcard into the men's doubles event of the 2024 Wimbledon Championships alongside compatriot Jacob Fearnley. At the same tournament he participated in the qualifying competition in singles where he also received a wildcard.

=== 2025: Challenger title, Major debut & first win, top 200 ===
In June, Pinnington Jones reached his first Challenger singles final at the Ilkley Open, losing to seventh seed Tristan Schoolkate in three sets. He made his ATP Tour debut at the Eastbourne Open, losing to eighth seed Nuno Borges. Thanks to his final showing in Ilkley, Pennington Jones was awarded a wildcard to make his Grand Slam main-draw singles debut at Wimbledon. He recorded his first major win, defeating Tomás Martín Etcheverry in the first round, before losing in the second round to 22nd seed Flavio Cobolli.

In July, Pinnington Jones won his maiden Challenger title at the Nottingham Challenger II, defeating fellow Briton Kyle Edmund in the final in what proved to be Edmund's final match as a professional.

He won his second Challenger title in September at the Winston-Salem Challenger, overcoming Trevor Svajda in the final and going through the entire tournament without losing a set. As a result he reached a new career-high ranking of world No. 177 on 15 September 2025.

=== 2026: First ATP quarterfinal, top 150 ===
In January, he entered qualifying for the 2026 Australian Open, but lost in straight sets to Belgian Gilles Arnaud Bailly.

The following month, he recorded a straight sets win over world No. 20 Flavio Cobolli at the ATP 500 2026 Dallas Open, for the loss of only four games to reach the round of 16. Next he defeated Eliot Spizzirri to reach his first tour-level quarterfinal and first at the ATP 500-level. Despite losing in the last eight to Marin Čilić, Pinnington Jones rose to a new career-high ATP ranking of world No. 138 on 16 February 2026.

He received a wildcard for the 2026 Wimbledon Championships. Ranked No. 147, he also received a wildcard for his second ATP 500 event, the 2026 Queen's Club Championships.

== Personal life ==
Pinnington Jones is from Ashtead in Surrey. A member of the LTA's pro-scholarship programme, Pinnington Jones is part of the JTC coaching Academy and is sponsored by Vuori, and coached by Marina Caiazzo. In 2021, he signed with Andy Murray's management company 77 Sports Management.

== Performance timeline ==
Key
| W | F | SF | QF | #R | RR | Q# | DNQ | A | NH |

(W) winner; (F) finalist; (SF) semifinalist; (QF) quarterfinalist; (#R) rounds 4, 3, 2, 1; (RR) round-robin stage; (Q#) qualification round; (DNQ) did not qualify; (A) absent; (NH) not held; (SR) strike rate (events won / competed); (W–L) win–loss record.

=== Singles ===
| Tournament | 2021 | 2022 | 2023 | 2024 | 2025 | 2026 | SR | W–L | Win% |
|---|---|---|---|---|---|---|---|---|---|
Grand Slam tournaments
| Australian Open | A | A | A | A | A | Q1 | 0 / 0 | 0–0 | – |
| French Open | A | A | A | A | A | Q1 | 0 / 0 | 0–0 | – |
| Wimbledon | Q1 | A | A | Q2 | 2R | 1R | 0 / 2 | 1–2 | 33% |
| US Open | A | A | A | A | Q1 | | 0 / 0 | 0–0 | – |
| Win–loss | 0–0 | 0–0 | 0–0 | 0–0 | 1–1 | 0–1 | 0 / 2 | 1–2 | 33% |

== ATP Challenger Tour finals ==
=== Singles: 4 (2 titles, 2 runners-up) ===
| Legend ATP Challenger Tour (2–2) | Finals by surface Hard (1–1) Clay (0–0) Grass (1–1) |

| Result | W–L | Date | Tournament | Tier | Surface | Opponent | Score |
|---|---|---|---|---|---|---|---|
| Loss | 0–1 | Jun 2025 | Ilkley, United Kingdom | Challenger | Grass | (Australia) Tristan Schoolkate | 7–6^{(10–8)}, 4–6, 3–6 |
| Win | 1–1 | Jul 2025 | Nottingham, United Kingdom | Challenger | Grass | (United Kingdom) Kyle Edmund | 6–4, 7–6^{(7–1)} |
| Win | 2–1 | Sep 2025 | Winston-Salem, United States | Challenger | Hard | (United States) Trevor Svajda | 6–2, 6–2 |
| Loss | 2–2 | Jan 2026 | Soma Bay, Egypt | Challenger | Hard | (South Africa) Lloyd Harris | 1–6, 2–5 ret. |

== ITF World Tennis Tour finals ==
=== Singles: 7 (5 titles, 2 runners-up) ===
| Legend ITF WTT (5–2) | Finals by surface Hard (3–1) Clay (2–1) |

| Result | W–L | Date | Tournament | Tier | Surface | Opponent | Score |
|---|---|---|---|---|---|---|---|
| Loss | 0–1 | Apr 2021 | M15 Cairo, Egypt | WTT | Clay | (Chile) Bastián Malla | 4–6, 6–1, 2–6 |
| Win | 1–1 | Oct 2021 | M15 Antalya, Turkey | WTT | Clay | Savva Polukhin | 6–7, 6–4, 6–2 |
| Win | 2–1 | Nov 2021 | M15 Heraklion, Greece | WTT | Hard | (Romania) Nicholas David Ionel | 7–6, 6–1 |
| Win | 3–1 | Mar 2022 | M25 Santa Margherita di Pula, Italy | WTT | Clay | (Italy) Giorgio Tabacco | 7–5, 6–2 |
| Win | 4–1 | Aug 2023 | M25 Roehampton, United Kingdom | WTT | Hard | (Estonia) Daniil Glinka | 6–4, 7–6 |
| Loss | 4–2 | Jul 2024 | M25 Nottingham, United Kingdom | WTT | Hard | (Denmark) August Holmgren | 6–4, 2–6, 2–6 |
| Win | 5–2 | Aug 2024 | M25 Aldershot, United Kingdom | WTT | Hard | (United States) Murphy Cassone | 6–0, 7–6 |

=== Doubles: 1 (1 runner-up) ===
| Legend ITF Futures/WTT (0–1) | Finals by surface Hard (0–1) Clay (0–0) |

| Result | W–L | Date | Tournament | Tier | Surface | Partner | Opponents | Score |
|---|---|---|---|---|---|---|---|---|
| Loss | 0–1 | Jul 2024 | M25 Nottingham, United Kingdom | WTT | Hard | (United Kingdom) William Nolan | (United Kingdom) Finn Bass (United Kingdom) Emile Hudd | 3–6, 3–6 |
