= Andrew Fenty =

American tennis player (born 2000)

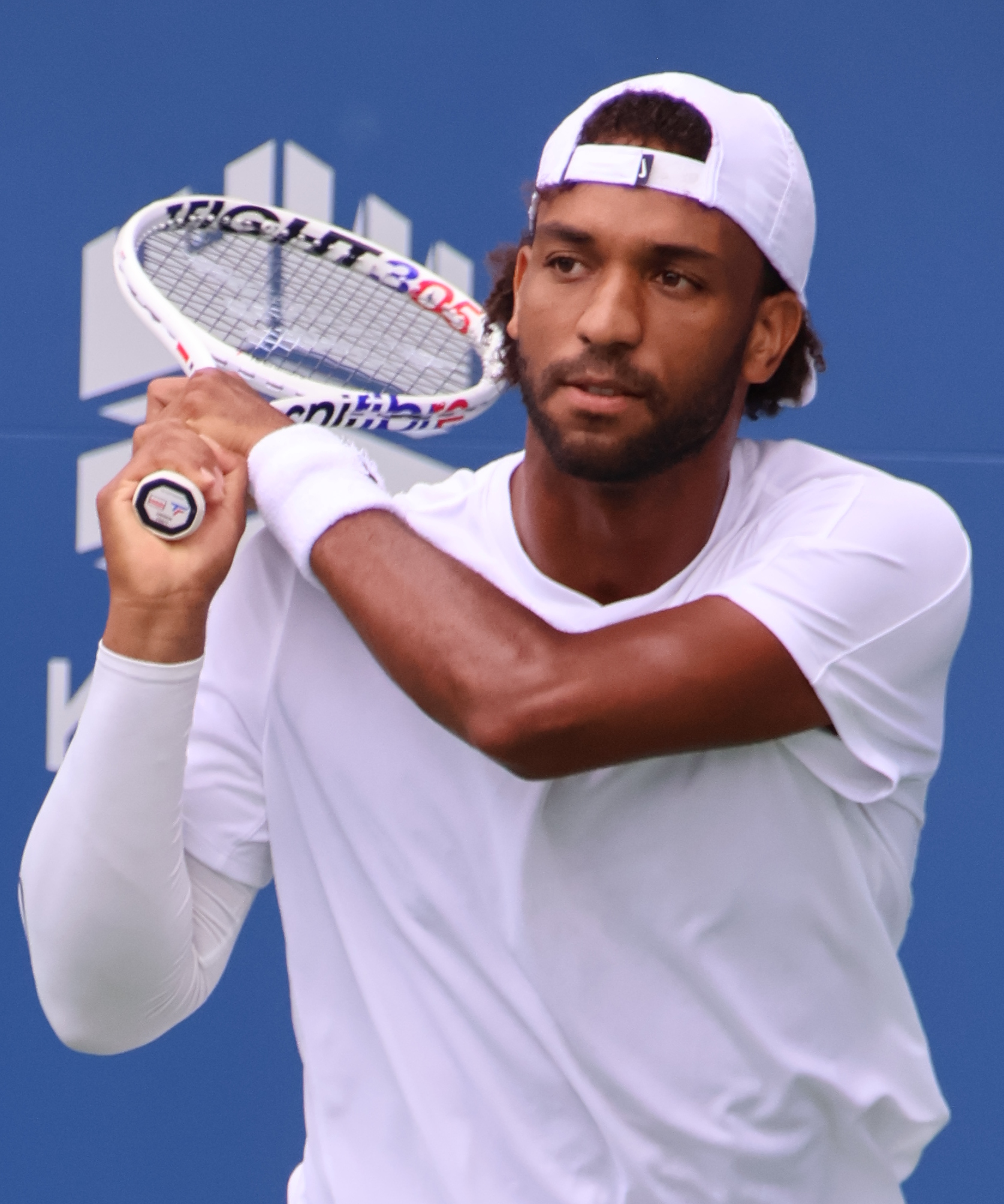
- Fenty at the 2025 Washington Open
- Country (sports): United States
- Born: March 8, 2000 (age 26) Washington, D.C., US
- Height: 6 ft 4 in (1.93 m)
- Plays: Right-handed (two-handed backhand)
- College: Michigan
- Prize money: US $97,123

Singles
- Career record: 0–0 (at ATP Tour level, Grand Slam level, and in Davis Cup)
- Career titles: 1 ITF
- Highest ranking: No. 382 (June 8, 2026)
- Current ranking: No. 478 (November 9, 2026)

Doubles
- Career record: 0–0 (at ATP Tour level, Grand Slam level, and in Davis Cup)
- Career titles: 1 Challenger, 3 ITF
- Highest ranking: No. 227 (November 3, 2025)
- Current ranking: No. 1,468 (November 9, 2026)
- Last updated on: November 9, 2026.

Andrew Fenty (born March 8, 2000) is an American tennis player. Fenty has a career high ATP singles ranking of No. 382 achieved on June 8, 2026 and a career high ATP doubles ranking of No. 227 achieved on November 3, 2025.

Fenty has won one ATP Challenger doubles title at the 2025 Winston-Salem Challenger.

Fenty played college tennis at Michigan.

He is of Italian American, Barbadian, Panamanian, and British Jamaican descent.
