= Daniel Milavsky =

American tennis player (born 2001)

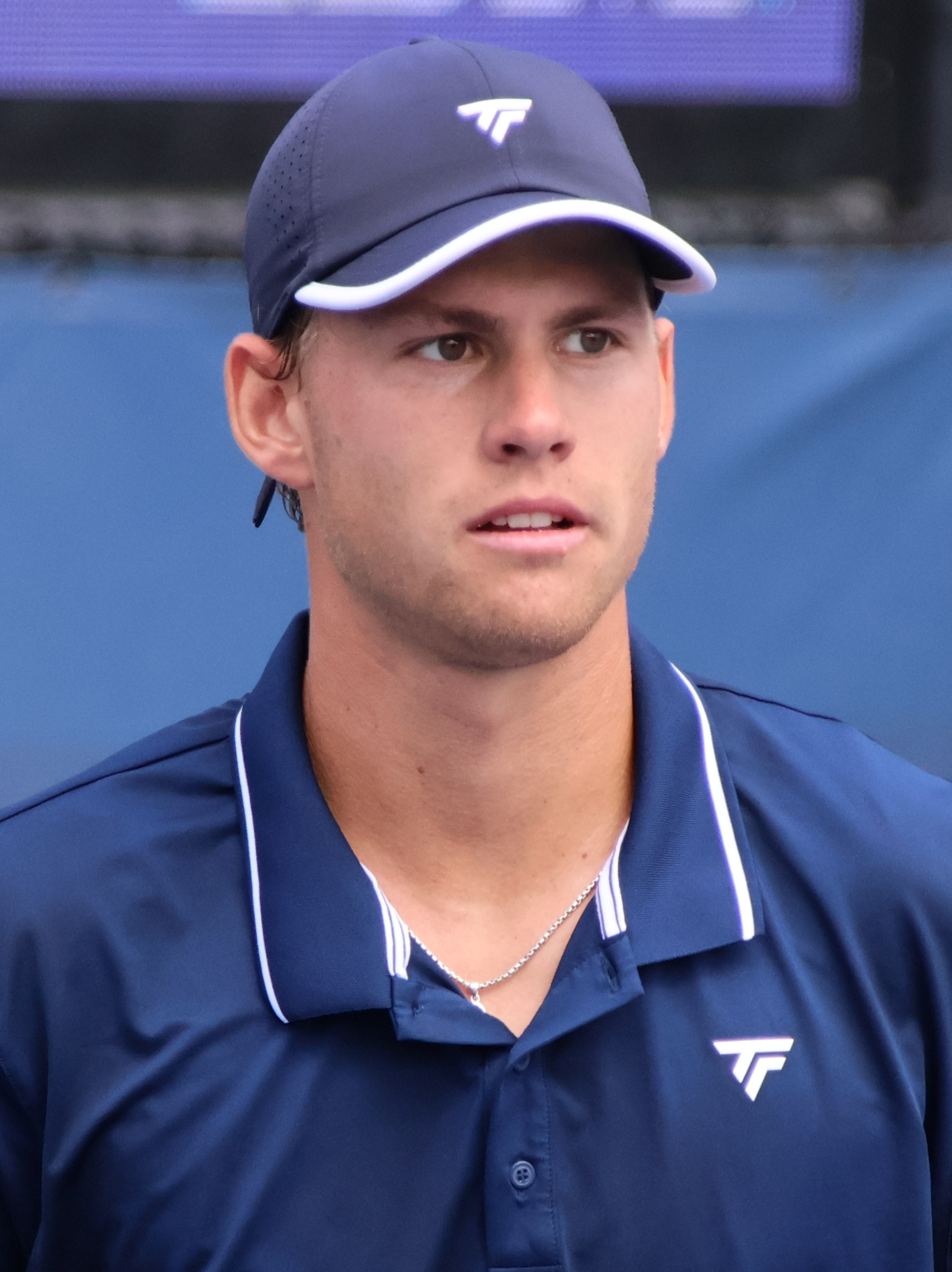
- Milavsky at the 2026 US Open
- Country (sports): United States
- Born: September 12, 2001 (age 25) Boston, United States
- Height: 6 ft 4 in (1.93 m)
- Plays: Right-handed (two-handed backhand)
- College: Harvard
- Coach: Ricardo Munar, Éric Prodon
- Prize money: US $173,904

Singles
- Career record: 0–0 (at ATP Tour level, Grand Slam level, and in Davis Cup)
- Career titles: 3 ITF
- Highest ranking: No. 285 (November 16, 2026)
- Current ranking: No. 285 (November 16, 2026)

Grand Slam singles results
- US Open: Q1 (2026)

Doubles
- Career record: 0–1 (at ATP Tour level, Grand Slam level, and in Davis Cup)
- Career titles: 1 Challenger, 5 ITF
- Highest ranking: No. 140 (November 9, 2026)
- Current ranking: No. 142 (November 16, 2026)

Grand Slam doubles results
- US Open: 1R (2026)
- Last updated on: November 16, 2026.

Daniel Milavsky (born September 12, 2001) is an American tennis player. Milavsky has a career-high ATP singles ranking of No. 285 achieved on November 16, 2026 and a doubles ranking of No. 140 achieved on November 9, 2026.

Milavsky has won one ATP Challenger doubles title at the 2025 Challenger Temuco.

Milavsky plays college tennis at Harvard.

== ATP Challenger and ITF World Tennis Tour finals ==
=== Singles: 7 (5 titles, 2 runner-ups) ===
Legend (singles) ITF World Tennis Tour (5–2)	Finals by surface Hard (5–2)

Result	W–L	Date	Tournament	Tier	Surface	Opponent	Score
Win	1–0	Nov 2024	M15 Tallahassee, United States	World Tennis Tour	Hard	(United States) Jack Anthrop	6–3, 6–2
Win	2–0	Jan 2025	M15 Kingston, Jamaica	World Tennis Tour	Hard	(France) Guillaume Dalmasso	6–4, 6–7^{(4–7)}, 7–5
Loss	2–1	Mar 2025	M15 Sherbrooke, Canada	World Tennis Tour	Hard (i)	(United States) Patrick Maloney	4–6, 7–6^{(7–3)}, 4–6
Win	3–1	Aug 2025	M25 Idanha-a-Nova, Portugal	World Tennis Tour	Hard	(United States) Tristan McCormick	7–6^{(7–4)}, 6–4
Win	4–1	Nov 2025	M15 Trois-Rivières, Canada	World Tennis Tour	Hard (i)	(United States) Theodore Dean	6–2, 3–6, 6–3
Loss	4–2	Mar 2026	M25 San José, Costa Rica	World Tennis Tour	Hard (i)	(United States) Gavin Young	6–3, 6–7^{(4–7)}, 6–7^{(4–7)}
Win	5–2	Apr 2026	M15 Villahermosa, Mexico	World Tennis Tour	Hard (i)	(United States) Maxwell McKennon	7–6^{(7–3)}, 6–3

=== Doubles: 16 (8 titles, 8 runner-ups) ===
Legend (Doubles) ATP Challenger Tour (2–4) ITF World Tennis Tour (6–4)	Finals by surface Hard (8–8)

Result	W–L	Date	Tournament	Tier	Surface	Partner	Opponents	Score
Win	1–0	Oct 2024	M15 Winston-Salem, United States	World Tennis Tour	Hard	(United States) Cooper Williams	(United States) Ryan Fishback (United States) Henry Lieberman	6–1, 6–1
Loss	1–1	Mar 2025	M15 Sherbrooke, Canada	World Tennis Tour	Hard (i)	(United States) Andrew Fenty	(United States) Matt Kuhar (Canada) Dan Martin	6–2, 2–6, [8–10]
Win	2–1	Mar 2025	M15 Montreal, Canada	World Tennis Tour	Hard (i)	(United States) Andrew Fenty	(Canada) Nicaise Muamba (United States) Jake van Emburgh	7–6^{(7–5)}, 4–6, [10–7]
Loss	2–2	Jun 2025	M25 Tulsa, United States	World Tennis Tour	Hard	(United States) Pranav Kumar	(United States) Zachary Fuchs (United States) Wally Thayne	3–6, 6–3, [6–10]
Win	3–2	Jul 2025	M15 Santa Tecla, El Salvador	World Tennis Tour	Hard	(Venezuela) Juan José Bianchi	(El Salvador) Cesar Cruz (El Salvador) Diego Duran	5–7, 6–4, [10–4]
Win	4–2	Jul 2025	M25+H Tauste, Spain	World Tennis Tour	Hard	(Venezuela) Juan José Bianchi	(United States) Tristan McCormick (United States) Maxwell McKennon	7–5, 6–1
Loss	4–3	Sep 2025	Winston-Salem Challenger, United States	Challenger	Hard	(Venezuela) Juan José Bianchi	(United States) Andrew Fenty (United States) Noah Schachter	4–6, 4–6
Loss	4–4	Nov 2025	M25 Montreal, Canada	World Tennis Tour	Hard (i)	(Canada) Duncan Chan	(United Kingdom) Ben Jones (Czech Republic) David Poljak	6–7^{(6–8)}, 6–4, [6–10]
Win	5–4	Nov 2025	Challenger Temuco, Chile	Challenger	Hard	(United States) Alafia Ayeni	(Canada) Juan Carlos Aguilar (Bolivia) Federico Zeballos	6–7^{(6–8)}, 6–4, [10–6]
Win	6–4	Jan 2026	M25 Winston-Salem, United States	World Tennis Tour	Hard (i)	(United States) Braden Shick	(United States) Ryan Colby (United States) Noah Zamora	6–4, 7–6^{(7–3)}
Loss	6–5	Mar 2026	M25 Las Vegas, United States	World Tennis Tour	Hard	(United States) Jack Vance	(United Kingdom) Oliver Okonkwo (United States) Billy Suarez	3–6, 3–6
Win	7–5	Apr 2026	M25 Xalapa, Mexico	World Tennis Tour	Hard	(United States) Pranav Kumar	(Mexico) Alejandro Hayen (United States) Jerry Roddick	7–5, 5–7, [10–8]
Win	8–5	Jul 2026	Winnipeg Challenger, Canada	Challenger	Hard	(United States) Braden Shick	(United States) Joshua Sheehy (United States) Tyler Zink	6–3, 3–6, [10–7]
Loss	8–6	Jul 2026	Vancouver Open, Canada	Challenger	Hard	(United States) Braden Shick	(United States) Nathaniel Lammons (United States) Jackson Withrow	6–7^{(7–9)}, 6–7^{(1–7)}
Loss	8–7	Sep 2026	Columbus Challenger, United States	Challenger	Hard (i)	(United States) Braden Shick	(United States) Brandon Carpico (United States) Nikita Samuel Filin	6–7^{(3–7)}, 6–2, [4–10]
Loss	8–8	Nov 2026	Charlottesville Men's Pro Challenger, United States	Challenger	Hard (i)	(United States) Braden Shick	(Netherlands) Jarno Jans (Belgium) Joran Vliegen	4–6, 4–6
