= Nicolas Mahut career statistics =

Career finals
Discipline	Type	Won	Lost	Total	WR^{1}
Singles	Grand Slam tournaments	–	–	–	–
Singles	Year-end championships	–	–	–	–
Singles	ATP Masters 1000 ^{2}	–	–	–	–
Singles	Olympic Games	–	–	–	–
Singles	ATP Tour 500	–	–	–	–
Singles	ATP Tour 250	4	2	6	0.67
Singles	Total	4	2	6	0.67
Doubles	Grand Slam tournaments	5	3	8	0.63
Doubles	Year-end championships	2	1	3	0.67
Doubles	ATP Masters 1000 ^{2}	7	4	11	0.64
Doubles	Olympic Games	–	–	–	–
Doubles	ATP Tour 500	8	1	9	0.89
Doubles	ATP Tour 250	15	11	26	0.58
Doubles	Total	37	20	57	0.65
Total		41	22	63	0.65
1) WR = Winning Rate; 2) Formerly known as "Super 9" (1996–1999), "Tennis Masters Series" (2000–2003) or "ATP Masters Series" (2004–2008).

This is a list of the main career statistics of professional tennis player Nicolas Mahut.

== Performance timelines ==
Key
W	F	SF	QF	#R	RR	Q#	P#	DNQ	A	Z#	PO	G	S	B	NMS	NTI	P	NH

(W) winner; (F) finalist; (SF) semifinalist; (QF) quarterfinalist; (#R) rounds 4, 3, 2, 1; (RR) round-robin stage; (Q#) qualification round; (P#) preliminary round; (DNQ) did not qualify; (A) absent; (Z#) Davis/Fed Cup Zonal Group (with number indication) or (PO) play-off; (G) gold, (S) silver or (B) bronze Olympic/Paralympic medal; (NMS) not a Masters tournament; (NTI) not a Tier I tournament; (P) postponed; (NH) not held; (SR) strike rate (events won / competed); (W–L) win–loss record.
To avoid confusion and double counting, these charts are updated at the conclusion of a tournament or when the player's participation has ended.

=== Singles ===
Tournament	2000	2001	2002	2003	2004	2005	2006	2007	2008	2009	2010	2011	2012	2013	2014	2015	2016	2017	2018	2019	2020	2021	SR	W–L	Win %
Grand Slam tournaments
Australian Open	A	1R	A	A	1R	A	A	2R	2R	A	A	2R	3R	A	1R	Q1	2R	1R	Q1	Q1	Q1	A	0 / 9	6–9	40%
French Open	1R	1R	A	1R	1R	A	1R	1R	1R	Q2	2R	1R	3R	1R	1R	3R	2R	1R	1R	3R	A	A	0 / 17	8–17	32%
Wimbledon	A	A	A	A	A	A	3R	2R	1R	1R	1R	1R	2R	2R	1R	2R	4R	1R	Q2	Q1	NH^{*}	A	0 / 12	9–12	43%
US Open	A	A	A	1R	1R	A	2R	1R	1R	Q1	Q3	2R	1R	1R	1R	2R	3R	3R	2R	Q2	A	A	0 / 13	8–13	38%
Win–loss	0–1	0–2	0–0	0–2	0–3	0–0	3–3	2–4	1–4	0–1	1–2	2–4	5–4	1–3	0–4	4–3	7–4	2–4	1–2	2–1	0–0	0–0	0 / 51	31–51	38%
National representation
Olympic Games	A	not held			A	not held			A	not held			A	not held			A	not held				A	0 / 0	0–0	–
Davis Cup	A	A	A	A	A	A	A	A	A	A	A	A	A	A	A	QF	SF	W	F	RR	RR		1 / 7	1–2	33%
ATP Tour Masters 1000
Indian Wells Masters	A	A	A	A	A	A	A	3R	3R	A	A	A	2R	A	1R	A	2R	1R	1R	A	NH^{*}	A	0 / 7	6–7	46%
Miami Open	A	A	A	A	A	A	A	1R	2R	Q1	A	A	2R	A	1R	Q1	1R	4R	A	A	NH^{*}	Q1	0 / 6	5–6	45%
Monte Carlo Masters	A	A	A	A	1R	A	1R	A	1R	A	A	A	A	Q1	2R	A	1R	1R	Q2	A	NH^{*}	A	0 / 6	1–6	14%
Madrid Masters	not held		A	A	A	A	A	A	A	A	A	Q1	A	A	1R	Q2	1R	2R	Q1	A	NH^{*}	A	0 / 3	1–3	25%
Rome Masters	A	A	A	A	A	A	A	A	2R	A	A	A	A	A	1R	A	2R	1R	A	A	A	A	0 / 4	2–4	33%
Canada Masters	A	A	A	A	A	1R	1R	A	2R	A	A	A	A	A	1R	1R	A	Q2	Q2	A	NH^{*}	A	0 / 5	1–5	17%
Cincinnati Masters	A	A	A	A	A	A	1R	Q1	A	A	A	A	A	Q1	1R	1R	2R	A	A	A	A	A	0 / 4	1–4	20%
Shanghai Masters	NMS		NH	NMS		not held				A	A	A	A	A	A	Q2	A	A	A	not held^{*}			0 / 0	0–0	–
Paris Masters	A	1R	A	2R	A	1R	1R	2R	Q2	A	1R	2R	A	2R	Q1	1R	2R	3R	1R	A	A	A	0 / 12	7–12	37%
Hamburg Masters	A	A	A	A	A	A	A	A	1R	Not Masters Series													0 / 1	0–1	0%
Stuttgart Masters	A	A	Discontinued																				0 / 0	0–0	–
Win–loss	0–0	0–1	0–0	1–1	0–1	0–2	0–4	3–3	5–6	0–0	0–1	1–1	2–2	1–1	1–7	0–3	4–7	6–6	0–2	0–0	0–0	0–0	0 / 48	24–48	33%
Career statistics
	2000	2001	2002	2003	2004	2005	2006	2007	2008	2009	2010	2011	2012	2013	2014	2015	2016	2017	2018	2019	2020	2021	Career		
Tournaments^{1}	2	4	1	6	10	5	19	19	26	4	7	12	18	9	23	11	21	19	8	3	0	0	227		
Titles	0	0	0	0	0	0	0	0	0	0	0	0	0	2	0	1	1	0	0	0	0	0	4		
Finals	0	0	0	0	0	0	0	2	0	0	0	0	0	2	0	1	1	0	0	0	0	0	6		
Overall win–loss^{2}	0–2	1–4	0–1	3–6	3–10	1–5	11–19	22–20	16–26	4–4	3–7	11–11	16–18	17–7	14–23	11–11	23–20	15–19	5–9	4–3	0–0	1–0	181–225		
Win %	0%	20%	0%	33%	23%	17%	37%	52%	38%	50%	30%	50%	47%	71%	38%	50%	53%	44%	36%	57%	0%	100%	45%		
Year-end rank	388	216	269	94	131	134	66	45	94	214	132	80	108	50	118	71	39	103	190	194	238	406	$12,886,495		

=== Doubles ===
Tournament	2000	2001	2002	2003	2004	2005	2006	2007	2008	2009	2010	2011	2012	2013	2014	2015	2016	2017	2018	2019	2020	2021	2022	2023	2024	2025	SR	W–L	Win %
Grand Slam tournaments
Australian Open	A	A	A	A	3R	2R	1R	QF	3R	A	A	A	1R	1R	SF	F	2R	QF	2R	W	1R	QF	1R	1R	2R	A	1 / 18	32–17	65%
French Open	2R	1R	1R	2R	1R	1R	QF	2R	A	3R	1R	3R	2R	F	3R	3R	3R	1R	W	2R	3R	W	1R	1R	1R	1R	2 / 25	37–23	62%
Wimbledon	A	A	A	A	2R	1R	1R	1R	3R	A	1R	2R	1R	2R	SF	3R	W	2R	2R	F	NH^{*}	2R	QF	2R	2R	1R	1 / 20	29–18	62%
US Open	A	A	A	A	SF	QF	1R	SF	2R	1R	1R	A	QF	3R	2R	W	SF	1R	3R	1R	1R	QF	1R	SF	A	1R	1 / 20	37–18	67%
Win–loss	1–1	0–1	0–1	1–1	7–4	4–4	3–4	8–4	5–3	2–2	0–3	3–2	4–4	8–4	11–3	15–3	13–3	4–4	10–3	12–3	2–3	13–3	2–4	5–4	2–2	0–3	5 / 83	135–76	64%
Year-end championships
ATP Finals	did not qualify															RR	RR	RR	F	W	DNQ	W	did not qualify				2 / 6	14–9	61%
National representation
Summer Olympics	A	not held			A	not held			A	not held			A	not held			1R	not held				1R	not held		A	NH	0 / 2	0–2	0%
Davis Cup	absent															QF	SF	W	F	RR	RR		RR	RR	RR	A	1 / 9	17–7	71%
ATP Tour Masters 1000
Indian Wells Masters	absent								1R	absent			1R	A	QF	A	W	2R	2R	2R	NH^{*}	A	1R	A	QF	A	1 / 9	12–7	63%
Miami Open	absent								1R	absent			1R	A	SF	2R	W	2R	A	A	NH^{*}	2R	1R	F	A	A	1 / 9	15–7	68%
Monte Carlo Masters	absent				2R	1R	absent		2R	absent				1R	2R	QF	W	SF	1R	1R	NH^{*}	QF	2R	1R	QF	A	1 / 14	12–13	48%
Madrid Masters	not held		absent												2R	2R	SF	F	SF	A	NH^{*}	QF	2R	A	1R	A	0 / 8	9–8	53%
Rome Masters	absent								1R	absent					2R	absent		W	A	A	2R	A	1R	1R	A	A	1 / 6	5–5	50%
Canada Masters	absent								1R	absent					2R	2R	A	W	2R	1R	NH^{*}	A	1R	2R	A	A	1 / 8	5–7	42%
Cincinnati Masters	absent													1R	A	2R	QF	W	2R	2R	1R	A	A	A	A	A	1 / 7	7–6	54%
Shanghai Masters	NMS		NH	NMS		not held				absent						QF	A	A	A	SF	not held^{*}			A	A	A	0 / 2	3–1	75%
Paris Masters	1R	1R	A	1R	SF	QF	A	1R	1R	absent		F	A	1R	1R	2R	F	QF	QF	W	QF	F	2R	A	A	1R	1 / 19	21–18	54%
Hamburg Masters	absent								1R	Not Masters Series																	0 / 1	0–1	0%
Stuttgart Masters	absent		Discontinued																								0 / 0	0–0	–
Win–loss	0–1	0–1	0–0	0–1	3–2	1–2	0–0	0–1	1–7	0–0	0–0	4–1	0–2	0–3	5–7	4–6	19–3	20–4	4–6	8–5	2–3	8–4	1–7	5–4	4–2	0–1	7 / 83	89–73	55%
Career statistics
	2000	2001	2002	2003	2004	2005	2006	2007	2008	2009	2010	2011	2012	2013	2014	2015	2016	2017	2018	2019	2020	2021	2022	2023	2024	2025	Career		
Tournaments^{1}	3	4	1	4	12	10	14	14	23	5	8	6	16	16	19	19	19	20	17	17	12	18	25	20	12	8	342		
Titles	0	0	0	1	1	0	0	0	0	1	0	0	3	1	1	2	6	4	4	4	3	4	2	0	0	0	37		
Finals	0	0	0	2	2	0	0	1	0	1	0	1	3	3	2	5	8	5	5	6	3	6	3	3	0	0	59		
Overall win–loss^{2}	2–3	0–4	0–1	6–3	21–10	9–10	9–13	19–14	14–23	7–4	6–9	9–6	18–13	22–14	28–17	33–17	48–15	36–14	36–13	36–13	17–12	43–14	23–25	21–23	8–10	1–8	472–308		
Win %	40%	0%	0%	67%	68%	47%	41%	58%	38%	64%	40%	60%	58%	61%	62%	66%	76%	72%	73%	73%	59%	75%	48%	48%	44%	11%	61%		
Year-end rank	207	279	290	75	27	57	83	38	81	98	97	59	51	32	19	12	1	8	11	3	7	5	50	38	116	468			

^{1} Including appearances in Grand Slam, ATP Tour main draw matches, and Summer Olympics.
^{2} Including matches in Grand Slam, ATP Tour events, Summer Olympics, Davis Cup, World Team Cup and ATP Cup.
^{*} not held due to COVID-19 pandemic.

== Significant finals ==
=== Grand Slam finals ===
==== Doubles: 8 (5 titles, 3 runner-up) ====
Result	Year	Championship	Surface	Partner	Opponents	Score
Loss	2013	French Open	Clay	(France) Michaël Llodra	(United States) Bob Bryan (United States) Mike Bryan	4–6, 6–4, 6–7^{(3–7)}
Loss	2015	Australian Open	Hard	(France) Pierre-Hugues Herbert	(Italy) Simone Bolelli (Italy) Fabio Fognini	4–6, 4–6
Win	2015	US Open	Hard	(France) Pierre-Hugues Herbert	(United Kingdom) Jamie Murray (Australia) John Peers	6–4, 6–4
Win	2016	Wimbledon	Grass	(France) Pierre-Hugues Herbert	(France) Julien Benneteau (France) Édouard Roger-Vasselin	6–4, 7–6^{(7–1)}, 6–3
Win	2018	French Open	Clay	(France) Pierre-Hugues Herbert	(Austria) Oliver Marach (Croatia) Mate Pavić	6–2, 7–6^{(7–4)}
Win	2019	Australian Open	Hard	(France) Pierre-Hugues Herbert	(Finland) Henri Kontinen (Australia) John Peers	6–4, 7–6^{(7–1)}
Loss	2019	Wimbledon	Grass	(France) Édouard Roger-Vasselin	(Colombia) Juan Sebastián Cabal (Colombia) Robert Farah	7–6^{(7–5)}, 6–7^{(5–7)}, 6–7^{(6–8)}, 7–6^{(7–5)}, 3–6
Win	2021	French Open (2)	Clay	(France) Pierre-Hugues Herbert	(Kazakhstan) Alexander Bublik (Kazakhstan) Andrey Golubev	4–6, 7–6^{(7–1)}, 6–4

=== Year-end championships ===
==== Doubles: 3 (2 titles, 1 runner-up) ====
Result	Year	Championship	Surface	Partner	Opponents	Score
Loss	2018	ATP Finals, London	Hard (i)	(France) Pierre-Hugues Herbert	(United States) Mike Bryan (United States) Jack Sock	7–5, 1–6, [11–13]
Win	2019	ATP Finals, London	Hard (i)	(France) Pierre-Hugues Herbert	(South Africa) Raven Klaasen (New Zealand) Michael Venus	6–3, 6–4
Win	2021	ATP Finals, Turin (2)	Hard (i)	(France) Pierre-Hugues Herbert	(United States) Rajeev Ram (United Kingdom) Joe Salisbury	6–4, 7–6^{(7–0)}

=== Masters 1000 finals ===
==== Doubles: 12 (7 titles, 5 runner-ups) ====
Result	Year	Tournament	Surface	Partner	Opponents	Score
Loss	2011	Paris Masters	Hard (i)	(France) Julien Benneteau	(India) Rohan Bopanna (Pakistan) Aisam-ul-Haq Qureshi	2–6, 4–6
Win	2016	Indian Wells Masters	Hard	(France) Pierre-Hugues Herbert	(Canada) Vasek Pospisil (United States) Jack Sock	6–3, 7–6^{(7–5)}
Win	2016	Miami Open	Hard	(France) Pierre-Hugues Herbert	(South Africa) Raven Klaasen (United States) Rajeev Ram	5–7, 6–1, [10–7]
Win	2016	Monte-Carlo Masters	Clay	(France) Pierre-Hugues Herbert	(United Kingdom) Jamie Murray (Brazil) Bruno Soares	4–6, 6–0, [10–6]
Loss	2016	Paris Masters	Hard (i)	(France) Pierre-Hugues Herbert	(Finland) Henri Kontinen (Australia) John Peers	4–6, 6–3, [6–10]
Loss	2017	Madrid Open	Clay	(France) Édouard Roger-Vasselin	(Poland) Łukasz Kubot (Brazil) Marcelo Melo	5–7, 3–6
Win	2017	Italian Open	Clay	(France) Pierre-Hugues Herbert	(Croatia) Ivan Dodig (Spain) Marcel Granollers	4–6, 6–4, [10–3]
Win	2017	Canadian Open	Hard	(France) Pierre-Hugues Herbert	(India) Rohan Bopanna (Croatia) Ivan Dodig	6–4, 3–6, [10–6]
Win	2017	Cincinnati Masters	Hard	(France) Pierre-Hugues Herbert	(United Kingdom) Jamie Murray (Brazil) Bruno Soares	7–6^{(8–6)}, 6–4
Win	2019	Paris Masters	Hard (i)	(France) Pierre-Hugues Herbert	(Russia) Karen Khachanov (Russia) Andrey Rublev	6–4, 6–1
Loss	2021	Paris Masters	Hard (i)	(France) Pierre-Hugues Herbert	(Germany) Tim Pütz (New Zealand) Michael Venus	3–6, 7–6^{(7–4)}, [9–11]
Loss	2023	Miami Open	Hard	(United States) Austin Krajicek	(Mexico) Santiago González (France) Édouard Roger-Vasselin	6–7^{(4–7)}, 5–7

== ATP World Tour career finals ==
=== Singles: 6 (4 titles, 2 runner-ups) ===
Legend Grand Slam tournaments (0–0) ATP World Tour Finals (0–0) ATP World Tour Masters 1000 (0–0) ATP World Tour 500 Series (0–0) ATP World Tour 250 Series (4–2)	Finals by surface Hard (0–0) Clay (0–0) Grass (4–2)	Finals by setting Outdoor (4–2) Indoor (0–0)

Result	W–L	Date	Tournament	Tier	Surface	Opponent	Score
Loss	0–1	Jun 2007	Queen's Club Championships, United Kingdom	International	Grass	(United States) Andy Roddick	6–4, 6–7^{(7–9)}, 6–7^{(2–7)}
Loss	0–2	Jul 2007	Hall of Fame Open, United States	International	Grass	(France) Fabrice Santoro	4–6, 4–6
Win	1–2	Jun 2013	Rosmalen Championships, Netherlands	250 Series	Grass	(Switzerland) Stan Wawrinka	6–3, 6–4
Win	2–2	Jul 2013	Hall of Fame Open, United States	250 Series	Grass	(Australia) Lleyton Hewitt	5–7, 7–5, 6–3
Win	3–2	Jun 2015	Rosmalen Championships, Netherlands (2)	250 Series	Grass	(Belgium) David Goffin	7–6^{(7–1)}, 6–1
Win	4–2	Jun 2016	Rosmalen Championships, Netherlands (3)	250 Series	Grass	(Luxembourg) Gilles Müller	6–4, 6–4

=== Doubles: 59 (37 titles, 22 runner-ups) ===
Legend Grand Slam tournaments (5–3) ATP World Tour Finals (2–1) ATP World Tour Masters 1000 (7–5) ATP World Tour 500 Series (8–1) ATP World Tour 250 Series (15–12)	Finals by surface Hard (28–14) Clay (4–4) Grass (5–3) Carpet (0–1)	Finals by setting Outdoor (17–9) Indoor (20–13)

Result	W–L	Date	Tournament	Tier	Surface	Partner	Opponents	Score
Win	1–0	Oct 2003	Open de Moselle, France	International	Hard (i)	(France) Julien Benneteau	(France) Michaël Llodra (France) Fabrice Santoro	7–6^{(7–2)}, 6–3
Loss	1–1	Oct 2003	Grand Prix de Tennis de Lyon, France	International	Carpet (i)	(France) Julien Benneteau	(Israel) Jonathan Erlich (Israel) Andy Ram	1–6, 3–6
Loss	1–2	Jul 2004	Hall of Fame Open, United States	International	Grass	(France) Grégory Carraz	(Australia) Jordan Kerr (United States) Jim Thomas	3–6, 7–6^{(7–5)}, 3–6
Win	2–2	Oct 2004	Open de Moselle, France (2)	International	Hard (i)	(France) Arnaud Clément	(Croatia) Ivan Ljubičić (Italy) Uros Vico	6–2, 7–6^{(10–8)}
Loss	2–3	Sep 2007	Thailand Open, Thailand	International	Hard (i)	(France) Michaël Llodra	(Thailand) Sanchai Ratiwatana (Thailand) Sonchat Ratiwatana	6–3, 5–7, [7–10]
Win	3–3	Oct 2009	Grand Prix de Tennis de Lyon, France	250 Series	Hard (i)	(France) Julien Benneteau	(France) Arnaud Clément (France) Sébastien Grosjean	6–4, 7–6^{(8–6)}
Loss	3–4	Nov 2011	Paris Masters, France	Masters 1000	Hard (i)	(France) Julien Benneteau	(India) Rohan Bopanna (Pakistan) Aisam-ul-Haq Qureshi	2–6, 4–6
Win	4–4	Feb 2012	Open Sud de France, France (2)	250 Series	Hard (i)	(France) Édouard Roger-Vasselin	(Australia) Paul Hanley (United Kingdom) Jamie Murray	6–4, 7–6^{(7–4)}
Win	5–4	Feb 2012	Open 13, France	250 Series	Hard (i)	(France) Édouard Roger-Vasselin	(Germany) Dustin Brown (France) Jo-Wilfried Tsonga	3–6, 6–3, [10–6]
Win	6–4	Sep 2012	Moselle Open, France (3)	250 Series	Hard (i)	(France) Édouard Roger-Vasselin	(Sweden) Johan Brunström (Denmark) Frederik Nielsen	7–6^{(7–3)}, 6–4
Loss	6–5	Jun 2013	French Open, France	Grand Slam	Clay	(France) Michaël Llodra	(United States) Bob Bryan (United States) Mike Bryan	4–6, 6–4, 6–7^{(4–7)}
Win	7–5	Jul 2013	Hall of Fame Open, United States	250 Series	Grass	(France) Édouard Roger-Vasselin	(United States) Tim Smyczek (United States) Rhyne Williams	6–7^{(4–7)}, 6–2, [10–5]
Loss	7–6	Sep 2013	Moselle Open, France	250 Series	Hard (i)	(France) Jo-Wilfried Tsonga	(Sweden) Johan Brunström (South Africa) Raven Klaasen	4–6, 6–7^{(5–7)}
Loss	7–7	Feb 2014	Open Sud de France, France	250 Series	Hard (i)	(France) Marc Gicquel	(Russia) Nikolay Davydenko (Uzbekistan) Denis Istomin	4–6, 6–1, [7–10]
Win	8–7	Feb 2014	Rotterdam Open, Netherlands	500 Series	Hard (i)	(France) Michaël Llodra	(Netherlands) Jean-Julien Rojer (Romania) Horia Tecău	6–2, 7–6^{(7–4)}
Loss	8–8	Jan 2015	Australian Open, Australia	Grand Slam	Hard	(France) Pierre-Hugues Herbert	(Italy) Simone Bolelli (Italy) Fabio Fognini	4–6, 4–6
Loss	8–9	Jun 2015	Rosmalen Championships, Netherlands	250 Series	Grass	(France) Pierre-Hugues Herbert	(Croatia) Ivo Karlović (Poland) Łukasz Kubot	2–6, 6–7^{(9–11)}
Win	9–9	Jun 2015	Queen's Club Championships, United Kingdom	500 Series	Grass	(France) Pierre-Hugues Herbert	(Poland) Marcin Matkowski (Serbia) Nenad Zimonjić	6–2, 6–2
Win	10–9	Sep 2015	US Open, United States	Grand Slam	Hard	(France) Pierre-Hugues Herbert	(United Kingdom) Jamie Murray (Australia) John Peers	6–4, 6–4
Loss	10–10	Sep 2015	Moselle Open, France	250 Series	Hard (i)	(France) Pierre-Hugues Herbert	(Poland) Łukasz Kubot (France) Édouard Roger-Vasselin	6–2, 3–6, [7–10]
Win	11–10	Feb 2016	Rotterdam Open, Netherlands (2)	500 Series	Hard (i)	(Canada) Vasek Pospisil	(Germany) Philipp Petzschner (Austria) Alexander Peya	7–6^{(7–2)}, 6–4
Win	12–10	Mar 2016	Indian Wells Masters, United States	Masters 1000	Hard	(France) Pierre-Hugues Herbert	(Canada) Vasek Pospisil (United States) Jack Sock	6–3, 7–6^{(7–5)}
Win	13–10	Apr 2016	Miami Open, United States	Masters 1000	Hard	(France) Pierre-Hugues Herbert	(South Africa) Raven Klaasen (United States) Rajeev Ram	5–7, 6–1, [10–7]
Win	14–10	Apr 2016	Monte-Carlo Masters, Monaco	Masters 1000	Clay	(France) Pierre-Hugues Herbert	(United Kingdom) Jamie Murray (Brazil) Bruno Soares	4–6, 6–0, [10–6]
Win	15–10	Jun 2016	Queen's Club Championships, United Kingdom (2)	500 Series	Grass	(France) Pierre-Hugues Herbert	(Australia) Chris Guccione (Brazil) André Sá	6–3, 7–6^{(7–5)}
Win	16–10	Jul 2016	Wimbledon Championships, United Kingdom	Grand Slam	Grass	(France) Pierre-Hugues Herbert	(France) Julien Benneteau (France) Édouard Roger-Vasselin	6–4, 7–6^{(7–1)}, 6–3
Loss	16–11	Oct 2016	European Open, Belgium	250 Series	Hard (i)	(France) Pierre-Hugues Herbert	(Canada) Daniel Nestor (France) Édouard Roger-Vasselin	4–6, 4–6
Loss	16–12	Nov 2016	Paris Masters, France	Masters 1000	Hard (i)	(France) Pierre-Hugues Herbert	(Finland) Henri Kontinen (Australia) John Peers	4–6, 6–3, [6–10]
Win	17–12	Feb 2017	Open 13, France (2)	250 Series	Hard (i)	(France) Julien Benneteau	(Netherlands) Robin Haase (United Kingdom) Dominic Inglot	6–4, 6–7^{(9–11)}, [10–5]
Loss	17–13	May 2017	Madrid Open, Spain	Masters 1000	Clay	(France) Édouard Roger-Vasselin	(Poland) Łukasz Kubot (Brazil) Marcelo Melo	5–7, 3–6
Win	18–13	May 2017	Italian Open, Italy	Masters 1000	Clay	(France) Pierre-Hugues Herbert	(Croatia) Ivan Dodig (Spain) Marcel Granollers	4–6, 6–4, [10–3]
Win	19–13	Aug 2017	Canadian Open, Canada	Masters 1000	Hard	(France) Pierre-Hugues Herbert	(India) Rohan Bopanna (Croatia) Ivan Dodig	6–4, 3–6, [10–6]
Win	20–13	Aug 2017	Cincinnati Masters, United States	Masters 1000	Hard	(France) Pierre-Hugues Herbert	(United Kingdom) Jamie Murray (Brazil) Bruno Soares	7–6^{(8–6)}, 6–4
Win	21–13	Feb 2018	Rotterdam Open, Netherlands (3)	500 Series	Hard (i)	(France) Pierre-Hugues Herbert	(Austria) Oliver Marach (Croatia) Mate Pavić	2–6, 6–2, [10–7]
Win	22–13	Jun 2018	French Open, France	Grand Slam	Clay	(France) Pierre-Hugues Herbert	(Austria) Oliver Marach (Croatia) Mate Pavić	6–3, 7–6^{(7–4)}
Win	23–13	Sep 2018	Moselle Open, France (4)	250 Series	Hard (i)	(France) Édouard Roger-Vasselin	(United Kingdom) Ken Skupski (United Kingdom) Neal Skupski	6–1, 7–5
Win	24–13	Oct 2018	European Open, Belgium	250 Series	Hard (i)	(France) Édouard Roger-Vasselin	(Brazil) Marcelo Demoliner (Mexico) Santiago González	6–4, 7–5
Loss	24–14	Nov 2018	ATP Finals, United Kingdom	Tour Finals	Hard (i)	(France) Pierre-Hugues Herbert	(United States) Mike Bryan (United States) Jack Sock	7–5, 1–6, [11–13]
Win	25–14	Jan 2019	Australian Open, Australia	Grand Slam	Hard	(France) Pierre-Hugues Herbert	(Finland) Henri Kontinen (Australia) John Peers	6–4, 7–6^{(7–1)}
Loss	25–15	Jul 2019	Wimbledon Championships, United Kingdom	Grand Slam	Grass	(France) Édouard Roger-Vasselin	(Colombia) Juan Sebastián Cabal (Colombia) Robert Farah	7–6^{(7–5)}, 6–7^{(5–7)}, 6–7^{(6–8)}, 7–6^{(7–5)}, 3–6
Loss	25–16	Sep 2019	Moselle Open, France	250 Series	Hard (i)	(France) Édouard Roger-Vasselin	(Sweden) Robert Lindstedt (Germany) Jan-Lennard Struff	6–2, 6–7^{(1–7)}, [4–10]
Win	26–16	Oct 2019	Japan Open, Japan	500 Series	Hard	(France) Édouard Roger-Vasselin	(Croatia) Nikola Mektić (Croatia) Franko Škugor	7–6^{(9–7)}, 6–4
Win	27–16	Nov 2019	Paris Masters, France	Masters 1000	Hard (i)	(France) Pierre-Hugues Herbert	(Russia) Karen Khachanov (Russia) Andrey Rublev	6–4, 6–1
Win	28–16	Nov 2019	ATP Finals, United Kingdom	Tour Finals	Hard (i)	(France) Pierre-Hugues Herbert	(South Africa) Raven Klaasen (New Zealand) Michael Venus	6–3, 6–4
Win	29–16	Feb 2020	Rotterdam Open, Netherlands (4)	500 Series	Hard (i)	(France) Pierre-Hugues Herbert	(Finland) Henri Kontinen (Germany) Jan-Lennard Struff	7–6^{(7–5)}, 4–6, [10–7]
Win	30–16	Feb 2020	Open 13, France (3)	250 Series	Hard (i)	(Canada) Vasek Pospisil	(Netherlands) Wesley Koolhof (Croatia) Nikola Mektić	6–3, 6–4
Win	31–16	Oct 2020	Cologne Indoors, Germany	250 Series	Hard (i)	(France) Pierre-Hugues Herbert	(Poland) Łukasz Kubot (Brazil) Marcelo Melo	6–4, 6–4
Loss	31–17	May 2021	Lyon Open, France	250 Series	Clay	(France) Pierre-Hugues Herbert	(Monaco) Hugo Nys (Germany) Tim Pütz	4–6, 7–5, [8–10]
Win	32–17	Jun 2021	French Open, France (2)	Grand Slam	Clay	(France) Pierre-Hugues Herbert	(Kazakhstan) Alexander Bublik (Kazakhstan) Andrey Golubev	4–6, 7–6^{(7–1)}, 6–4
Win	33–17	Jun 2021	Queen's Club Championships, United Kingdom (3)	500 Series	Grass	(France) Pierre-Hugues Herbert	(United States) Reilly Opelka (Australia) John Peers	6–4, 7–5
Win	34–17	Oct 2021	European Open, Belgium (2)	250 Series	Hard (i)	(France) Fabrice Martin	(Netherlands) Wesley Koolhof (Netherlands) Jean-Julien Rojer	6–0, 6–1
Loss	34–18	Nov 2021	Paris Masters, France	Masters 1000	Hard (i)	(France) Pierre-Hugues Herbert	(Germany) Tim Pütz (New Zealand) Michael Venus	3–6, 7–6^{(7–4)}, [9–11]
Win	35–18	Nov 2021	ATP Finals, Italy (2)	Tour Finals	Hard (i)	(France) Pierre-Hugues Herbert	(United States) Rajeev Ram (United Kingdom) Joe Salisbury	6–4, 7–6^{(7–0)}
Win	36–18	Feb 2022	Open Sud de France, France (3)	250 Series	Hard (i)	(France) Pierre-Hugues Herbert	(United Kingdom) Lloyd Glasspool (Finland) Harri Heliövaara	4–6, 7–6^{(7–3)}, [12–10]
Win	37–18	Oct 2022	Firenze Open, Italy	250 Series	Hard (i)	(France) Édouard Roger-Vasselin	(Croatia) Ivan Dodig (United States) Austin Krajicek	7–6^{(7–4)}, 6–3
Loss	37–19	Oct 2022	Swiss Indoors, Switzerland	500 Series	Hard (i)	(France) Édouard Roger-Vasselin	(Croatia) Ivan Dodig (United States) Austin Krajicek	4–6, 6–7^{(5–7)}
Loss	37–20	Feb 2023	Open 13, France	250 Series	Hard (i)	(France) Fabrice Martin	(Mexico) Santiago González (France) Édouard Roger-Vasselin	6–4, 6–7^{(4–7)}, [7–10]
Loss	37–21	Mar 2023	Miami Open, United States	Masters 1000	Hard	(United States) Austin Krajicek	(Mexico) Santiago González (France) Édouard Roger-Vasselin	6–7^{(4–7)}, 5–7
Loss	37–22	May 2023	Lyon Open, France	250 Series	Clay	(Netherlands) Matwé Middelkoop	(United States) Rajeev Ram (United Kingdom) Joe Salisbury	0–6, 3–6

== Other finals ==
=== ATP Challenger Tour and ITF Men's Circuit ===
==== Singles: 27 (17 titles, 10 runner-ups) ====
Legend (singles) ATP Challenger Tour (12–9) ITF Futures Tour (5–1)	Titles by surface Hard (13–10) Clay (2–0) Grass (1–0) Carpet (1–0)

Result	W–L	Date	Tournament	Tier	Surface	Opponent	Score
Win	1–0	Aug 2001	Luxembourg F1, Luxembourg	Futures	Clay	(France) Stéphane Martinez	6–2, 6–1
Win	2–0	Sep 2001	France F15, Bagnères-de-Bigorre	Futures	Hard	(France) Marc Gicquel	6–3, 6–2
Win	3–0	Sep 2002	France F17, Plaisir	Futures	Hard	(France) Jean-Christophe Faurel	7–6^{(7–4)}, 4–6, 6–2
Loss	3–1	Oct 2002	France F21, La Roche-sur-Yon	Futures	Hard (i)	(France) Marc Gicquel	4–6, 7–5, 2–6
Win	4–1	Jan 2003	France F3, Deauville	Futures	Clay (i)	(France) Régis Lavergne	4–6, 6–3, 6–3
Win	5–1	Mar 2003	France F7, Poitiers	Futures	Hard (i)	(Italy) Daniele Bracciali	7–6^{(7–3)}, 7–6^{(12–10)}
Loss	5–2	Jun 2003	Córdoba, Spain	Challenger	Hard	(Italy) Stefano Pescosolido	4–6, 3–6
Win	6–2	Jul 2003	Manchester, UK	Challenger	Grass	(Belgium) Gilles Elseneer	6–3, 7–6^{(7–5)}
Win	7–2	Jul 2004	Valladolid, Spain	Challenger	Hard	(France) Jean-Michel Pequery	6–3, 3–6, 6–5 ret.
Loss	7–3	Jul 2004	Segovia, Spain	Challenger	Hard	(France) Paul-Henri Mathieu	7–6^{(7–4)}, 4–6, 4–6
Loss	7–4	Oct 2004	Grenoble, France	Challenger	Hard (i)	(Slovakia) Karol Kučera	5–7, 2–6
Loss	7–5	Feb 2005	Cherbourg, France	Challenger	Hard (i)	(South Africa) Rik de Voest	5–7, 2–6
Loss	7–6	Sep 2005	Orléans, France	Challenger	Hard (i)	(France) Cyril Saulnier	3–6, 4–6
Win	8–6	Feb 2006	Besançon, France	Challenger	Hard (i)	(Canada) Frank Dancevic	6–3, 6–4
Win	9–6	Mar 2006	Cherbourg, France	Challenger	Hard (i)	(France) Jean-Christophe Faurel	6–2, 6–4
Win	10–6	Mar 2006	Kyoto, Japan	Challenger	Carpet (i)	(Chinese Taipei) Lu Yen-hsun	6–4, 6–1
Loss	10–7	Sep 2007	Orléans, France	Challenger	Hard (i)	(Belgium) Olivier Rochus	4–6, 4–6
Win	11–7	Sep 2008	Orléans, France	Challenger	Hard (i)	(Belgium) Christophe Rochus	5–7, 6–1, 7–6^{(7–2)}
Win	12–7	Mar 2010	Cherbourg, France (2)	Challenger	Hard (i)	(Luxembourg) Gilles Müller	6–4, 6–3
Win	13–7	Oct 2010	Orléans, France (2)	Challenger	Hard (i)	(Bulgaria) Grigor Dimitrov	2–6, 7–6^{(8–6)}, 7–6^{(7–4)}
Win	14–7	Feb 2011	Courmayeur, Italy	Challenger	Hard (i)	(Luxembourg) Gilles Müller	7–6^{(7–4)}, 6–4
Loss	14–8	Mar 2011	Cherbourg, France	Challenger	Hard (i)	(Bulgaria) Grigor Dimitrov	2–6, 6–7^{(4–7)}
Win	15–8	Oct 2013	Rennes, France	Challenger	Hard	(France) Kenny de Schepper	6–3, 7–6^{(7–3)}
Loss	15–9	Oct 2013	Mouilleron-le-Captif, France	Challenger	Hard (i)	(Germany) Michael Berrer	6–1, 4–6, 3–6
Win	16–9	Sep 2014	Saint-Rémy-de-Provence, France	Challenger	Hard	(France) Vincent Millot	6–7^{(3–7)}, 6–4, 6–3
Loss	16–10	Oct 2014	Rennes, France	Challenger	Hard	(Belgium) Steve Darcis	2–6, 4–6
Win	17–10	Apr 2015	Saint-Brieuc, France	Challenger	Hard (i)	(Japan) Yūichi Sugita	3–6, 7–6^{(7–3)}, 6–4

==== Doubles: 38 (28 titles, 10 runner-ups) ====
Legend (doubles) ATP Challenger Tour (21–9) ITF Futures Tour (7–1)	Titles by surface Hard (18–7) Clay (7–3) Grass (2–0) Carpet (1–0)

Result	W–L	Date	Tournament	Tier	Surface	Partner	Opponents	Score
Win	1–0	Jul 1999	France F8, Aix-les-Bains	Futures	Clay	(France) Julien Cassaigne	(France) Thierry Ascione (France) Marc-Oliver Baron	6–3, 7–6^{(7–4)}
Loss	1–1	Mar 2000	Cherbourg, France	Challenger	Hard (i)	(France) Julien Benneteau	(France) Julien Boutter (France) Michaël Llodra	6–2, 4–6, 5–7
Win	2–1	Jul 2000	Contrexéville, France	Challenger	Clay	(France) Julien Benneteau	(France) Jean-René Lisnard (France) Olivier Patience	6–3, 7–6^{(7–4)}
Win	3–1	Oct 2000	France F19, Plaisir	Futures	Hard (i)	(France) Julien Benneteau	(Israel) Noam Behr (Pakistan) Aisam-ul-Haq Qureshi	6–3, 7–6^{(7–5)}
Win	4–1	Feb 2001	Andrézieux, France (2)	Challenger	Hard (i)	(France) Julien Benneteau	(Israel) Noam Behr (Israel) Jonathan Erlich	6–3, 6–3
Loss	4–2	Jun 2001	Italy F7, Torino	Futures	Clay	(France) Olivier Patience	(Australia) Alun Jones (Australia) Todd Larkham	3–6, 6–7^{(6–8)}
Win	5–2	Jul 2001	France F11, Bourg-en-Bresse	Futures	Clay	(France) Julien Benneteau	(France) Christophe Deveaux (France) Nicolas Devilder	6–4, 7–6^{(7–4)}
Win	6–2	Feb 2002	Lübeck, Germany	Challenger	Carpet (i)	(France) Grégory Carraz	(Switzerland) Yves Allegro (Russia) Denis Golovanov	4–6, 7–6^{(9–7)}, 6–1
Win	7–2	Mar 2002	France F6, Lille	Futures	Hard (i)	(France) Julien Benneteau	(France) Maxime Boyé (France) Thomas Dupré	6–3, 7–5
Win	8–2	Jan 2003	France F1, Grasse	Futures	Clay (i)	(France) Édouard Roger-Vasselin	(France) Thierry Ascione (France) Jérôme Haehnel	6–3, 1–6, 6–2
Win	9–2	Jan 2003	France F2, Angers	Futures	Clay (i)	(France) Édouard Roger-Vasselin	(France) Clément Morel (France) Laurent Recouderc	6–1, 7–6^{(7–0)}
Win	10–2	Feb 2003	France F4, Feucherolles	Futures	Hard (i)	(France) Marc Gicquel	(Switzerland) Matthieu Amgwerd (Brazil) Josh Goffi	7–5, 6–4
Loss	10–3	Mar 2003	Besançon, France	Challenger	Hard (i)	(France) Richard Gasquet	(Israel) Jonathan Erlich (Austria) Julian Knowle	3–6, 4–6
Win	11–3	Jul 2003	Bristol, UK	Challenger	Grass	(France) Jean-François Bachelot	(United Kingdom) Dan Kiernan (United Kingdom) David Sherwood	7–6^{(7–4)}, 5–7, 7–6^{(7–5)}
Win	12–3	Aug 2003	Bronx, US	Challenger	Hard	(France) Julien Benneteau	(Argentina) Martín García (United States) Graydon Oliver	6–3, 6–1
Win	13–3	Sep 2003	Saint-Jean-de-Luz, France	Challenger	Hard (i)	(France) Julien Benneteau	(Sweden) Johan Landsberg (South Africa) Myles Wakefield	6–4, 6–1
Win	14–3	Jul 2004	Manchester, UK	Challenger	Grass	(France) Jean-François Bachelot	(Pakistan) Aisam-ul-Haq Qureshi (Croatia) Lovro Zovko	6–2, 6–4
Win	15–3	Jul 2004	Valladolid, Spain	Challenger	Hard	(France) Jean-François Bachelot	(Pakistan) Aisam-ul-Haq Qureshi (Sweden) Michael Ryderstedt	6–3, 6–4
Loss	15–4	Jul 2005	Córdoba, Spain	Challenger	Hard	(Luxembourg) Gilles Müller	(Ukraine) Sergiy Stakhovsky (Belarus) Vladimir Voltchkov	5–7, 7–5, 1–6
Loss	15–5	Aug 2005	Bronx, US	Challenger	Hard	(France) Julien Benneteau	(United States) Cecil Mamiit (United States) Brian Vahaly	4–6, 4–6
Win	16–5	Sep 2005	Orléans, France	Challenger	Hard (i)	(France) Julien Benneteau	(France) Grégory Carraz (France) Antony Dupuis	3–6, 6–4, 6–2
Win	17–5	Oct 2005	Grenoble, France	Challenger	Hard (i)	(France) Julien Benneteau	(France) Grégory Carraz (France) Nicolas Tourte	4–6, 6–4, 6–3
Win	18–5	Feb 2006	Andrézieux, France	Challenger	Hard (i)	(France) Julien Benneteau	(France) Grégory Carraz (France) Antony Dupuis	6–4, 6–4
Win	19–5	May 2006	Sanremo, Italy	Challenger	Clay	(France) Julien Benneteau	(Italy) Flavio Cipolla (Italy) Francesco Piccari	6–4, 7–6^{(8–6)}
Win	20–5	Aug 2009	Segovia, Spain	Challenger	Hard	(France) Édouard Roger-Vasselin	(Ukraine) Sergiy Stakhovsky (Croatia) Lovro Zovko	6–7^{(4–7)}, 6–3, [10–8]
Win	21–5	Mar 2010	Cherbourg, France	Challenger	Hard (i)	(France) Édouard Roger-Vasselin	(India) Harsh Mankad (Canada) Adil Shamasdin	6–2, 6–4
Win	22–5	Mar 2010	Sarajevo, Bosnia and Herzegovina	Challenger	Hard (i)	(France) Édouard Roger-Vasselin	(Croatia) Ivan Dodig (Czech Republic) Lukáš Rosol	7–6^{(8–6)}, 6–7^{(7–9)}, [10–5]
Win	23–5	Apr 2010	Johannesburg, South Africa	Challenger	Hard	(Croatia) Lovro Zovko	(South Africa) Raven Klaasen (South Africa) Izak van der Merwe	6–2, 6–2
Win	24–5	May 2010	Bordeaux, France	Challenger	Clay	(France) Édouard Roger-Vasselin	(Slovakia) Karol Beck (Czech Republic) Leoš Friedl	5–7, 6–3, [10–7]
Loss	24–6	Oct 2010	Orléans, France	Challenger	Hard (i)	(France) Sébastien Grosjean	(France) Pierre-Hugues Herbert (France) Nicolas Renavand	7–6^{(7–3)}, 1–6, [10–6]
Win	25–6	Feb 2011	Courmayeur, Italy	Challenger	Hard (i)	(France) Marc Gicquel	(France) Olivier Charroin (France) Alexandre Renard	6–3, 6–4
Loss	25–7	Mar 2011	Cherbourg, France	Challenger	Hard (i)	(France) Édouard Roger-Vasselin	(France) Pierre-Hugues Herbert (France) Nicolas Renavand	6–3, 4–6, [5–10]
Loss	25–8	May 2011	Bordeaux, France	Challenger	Clay	(France) Julien Benneteau	(United Kingdom) Jamie Delgado (United Kingdom) Jonathan Marray	5–7, 3–6
Loss	25–9	Aug 2011	Segovia, Spain	Challenger	Hard	(Croatia) Lovro Zovko	(Sweden) Johan Brunström (Denmark) Frederik Nielsen	2–6, 6–3, [6–10]
Win	26–9	Sep 2014	Mons, Belgium	Challenger	Hard (i)	(France) Marc Gicquel	(Germany) Andre Begemann (Austria) Julian Knowle	6–3, 6–4
Win	27–9	Nov 2014	Orléans, France	Challenger	Hard (i)	(France) Pierre-Hugues Herbert	(Germany) Tobias Kamke (Germany) Philipp Marx	6–3, 6–4
Win	28–9	Sep 2022	Orléans, France	Challenger	Hard (i)	(France) Édouard Roger-Vasselin	(Belgium) Michael Geerts (Tunisia) Skander Mansouri	6–2, 6–4
Loss	28–10	May 2024	Bordeaux, France	Challenger	Clay	(France) Quentin Halys	(United Kingdom) Julian Cash (United States) Robert Galloway	3–6, 6–7^{(2–7)}

=== ITF Junior's Circuit ===
==== Singles: 4 (1 title, 3 runner-ups) ====
Legend
Category GA (1–0)
Category G1 (0–2)
Category G2 (0–0)
Category G3 (0–0)
Category G4 (0–1)
Category G5 (0–0)

Result	No.	Date	Tournament	Surface	Opponent	Score
Loss	1.	11 December 1998	Prince Cup, Miami, United States	Hard	(United Kingdom) Lee Childs	6–7, 4–6
Loss	2.	2 January 1999	Casablanca Cup, Tlalnepantla, Mexico	Hard	(Germany) Dominik Meffert	6–7, 4–6
Loss	3.	25 June 1999	International Junior Championships, London, United Kingdom	Grass	(Bulgaria) Todor Enev	3–6, 5–7
Win	1.	25 June 1999	Wimbledon, London, United Kingdom	Grass	(Croatia) Mario Ančić	6–3, 3–6, 7–5

==== Doubles: 11 (8 titles, 3 runner-up) ====
Legend
Category GA (3–0)
Category G1 (3–3)
Category G2 (1–0)
Category G3 (0–0)
Category G4 (0–0)
Category G5 (1–0)

Result	No.	Date	Tournament	Surface	Partner	Opponents	Score
Win	1.	11 April 1998	Tournoi International Junior de Sainte Marie, Martinique, France	Hard	(France) Julien Benneteau	(Antigua and Barbuda) Peters Fernando (Jamaica) Ryan Russel	6–3, 2–6, 6–0
Loss	1.	27 December 1998	Yucatán Cup, Yucatán, Mexico	Clay	(France) Julien Benneteau	(United States) Alex Bogomolov, Jr. (United States) Scott Lipsky	5–7, 6–4, 3–6
Loss	2.	2 January 1999	Casablanca Cup, Tlalnepantla, Mexico	Hard	(France) Julien Benneteau	(United States) Alberto Francis (United States) Tres Davis	4–6, 1–6
Win	2.	9 January 1999	Copa del Cafe, San José, Costa Rica	Hard	(France) Julien Benneteau	(United States) Alberto Francis (United States) Tres Davis	6–4, 6–3
Win	3.	17 January 1999	Pony Malta Cup, Barranquilla, Colombia	Clay	(France) Julien Benneteau	(Israel) Meir Deri (Portugal) Miguel Sequeira	6–1, 6–2
Win	4.	18 June 1999	International Junior Championships, East Molesey, United Kingdom	Grass	(France) Julien Benneteau	(United Kingdom) Richard Brooks (United Kingdom) Nick Greenhouse	6–2, 6–2
Win	5.	5 September 1999	Canadian International Junior Championships, Parc Larochelle, Canada	Grass	(France) Julien Benneteau	(Bulgaria) Todor Enev (Finland) Jarkko Nieminen	6–2, 1–6, 6–2
Win	6.	12 September 1999	US Open, New York, United States	Grass	(France) Julien Benneteau	(United States) Tres Davis (United States) Alberto Francis	6–4, 3–6, 6–1
Win	7.	20 December 1999	Rado Orange Bowl Tennis Championships, Miami, United States	Grass	(France) Julien Benneteau	(United States) Mardy Fish (Sweden) Joachim Johansson	6–3, 6–3
Loss	3.	22 January 2000	Australian Hardcourt Junior Championships, Melbourne, Australia	Hard	(Spain) Tommy Robredo	(United States) Tres Davis (United States) Andy Roddick	6–7^{(4–7)}, 4–6
Win	8.	30 January 2000	Australian Open, Melbourne, Australia	Grass	(Spain) Tommy Robredo	(United States) Tres Davis (United States) Alberto Francis	6–2, 5–7, [11–9]

== Top 10 wins ==
- Mahut has a 5–39 record against players who were, at the time the match was played, ranked in the top 10.

Season	2000	2001	2002	2003	2004	2005	2006	2007	2008	2009	2010	2011	2012	2013	2014	2015	2016	2017	2018	2019	2020	2021	Total
Wins	0	0	0	1	0	0	0	2	0	0	0	0	1	1	0	0	0	0	0	0	0	0	5

#	Player	Rank	Event	Surface	Rd	Score	NM Rank
2003
1.	(France) Sébastien Grosjean	10	Lyon, France	Carpet (i)	1R	4–6, 6–3, ret.	112
2007
2.	(Croatia) Ivan Ljubičić	8	Marseille, France	Hard (i)	1R	6–4, 6–4	65
3.	(Spain) Rafael Nadal	2	Queen's Club, London, United Kingdom	Grass	QF	7–5, 7–6^{(7–0)}	106
2012
4.	(United Kingdom) Andy Murray	4	Queen's Club, London, United Kingdom	Grass	2R	6–3, 6–7^{(4–7)}, 7–6^{(7–1)}	65
2013
5.	(Switzerland) Stan Wawrinka	10	's-Hertogenbosch, Netherlands	Grass	F	6–3, 6–4	240

== Career Grand Slam seedings ==
The tournaments won by Mahut are in boldface, while those where he was runner-up are in italics.

=== Singles ===
Legend
seeded No. 1 (0 / 0)
seeded No. 2 (0 / 0)
seeded No. 3 (0 / 0)
seeded No. 4–10 (0 / 0)
Seeded outside the top 10 (0 / 0)
not seeded (0 / 30)
qualifier(0 / 8)
alternate (0 / 0)
Protected ranking (0 / 0)
wild card (0 / 13)
special exempt (0 / 0)
lucky loser (0 / 0)

Year	Australian Open	French Open	Wimbledon	US Open
2000	did not play	qualifier	did not play	did not play
2001	wild card	wild card	did not play	did not play
2002	did not play	did not play	did not play	did not play
2003	did not play	wild card	did not play	qualifier
2004	not seeded	wild card	did not play	qualifier
2005	did not play	did not play	did not play	did not play
2006	did not play	not seeded	not seeded	not seeded
2007	not seeded	wild card	qualifier	not seeded
2008	not seeded	not seeded	not seeded	not seeded
2009	did not play	did not play	wild card	did not play
2010	did not play	wild card	qualifier	did not play
2011	qualifier	not seeded	not seeded	not seeded
2012	not seeded	not seeded	not seeded	not seeded
2013	did not play	wild card	wild card	not seeded
2014	not seeded	not seeded	not seeded	not seeded
2015	did not play	wild card	wild card	not seeded
2016	not seeded	not seeded	not seeded	not seeded
2017	not seeded	not seeded	not seeded	qualifier
2018	did not play	wild card	did not play	qualifier
2019	did not play	wild card	did not play	did not play
2020	did not play	did not play	cancelled*	did not play

=== Doubles ===
Legend
seeded No. 1 (1 / 5)
seeded No. 2 (0 / 3)
seeded No. 3 (0 / 3)
seeded No. 4–10 (3 / 14)
Seeded outside the top 10 (1 / 16)
not seeded (0 / 33)
qualifier(0 / 0)
alternate (0 / 0)
Protected ranking (0 / 4)
wild card (0 / 5)
special exempt (0 / 0)
lucky loser (0 / 0)

Year	Australian Open	French Open	Wimbledon	US Open
2000	did not play	not seeded	did not play	did not play
2001	did not play	not seeded	did not play	did not play
2002	did not play	wild card	did not play	did not play
2003	did not play	wild card	did not play	did not play
2004	not seeded	not seeded	not seeded	not seeded
2005	15th	not seeded	not seeded	not seeded
2006	not seeded	not seeded	not seeded	not seeded
2007	not seeded	not seeded	not seeded	not seeded
2008	14th	did not play	16th	16th
2009	did not play	wild card	did not play	not seeded
2010	did not play	not seeded	not seeded	not seeded
2011	did not play	not seeded	not seeded	did not play
2012	not seeded	not seeded	not seeded	not seeded
2013	not seeded	not seeded	13th	14th
2014	13th	5th	12th	10th
2015	not seeded	14th	10th	**12th**
2016	6th	1st	**1st**	1st
2017	1st	2nd	2nd	3rd
2018	4th	**6th**	4th	9th
2019	**5th**	13th	11th	4th
2020	1st	6th	cancelled*	not seeded
2021	8th	**6th**	2nd	3rd
2022	7th	3rd	12th	16th
2023	17th	PR	11th	PR
2024	12th	wild card	not seeded	did not play
2025	did not play	wild card	PR	PR

* The 2020 Wimbledon Championships was cancelled due to the COVID-19 pandemic.

== See also ==
- Longest tennis match records
- Isner–Mahut match at the 2010 Wimbledon Championships
- France Davis Cup team
- List of France Davis Cup team representatives
- Sport in France
