= 2009 Challenger DCNS de Cherbourg =

- Date: March 2 – March 8
- Edition: 16th
- Location: Cherbourg-en-Cotentin, France

Champions

Singles
- (France) Arnaud Clément

Doubles
- (France) Arnaud Clément / (France) Édouard Roger-Vasselin
← 2008 ·	Challenger La Manche	· 2010 →

The 2009 Challenger DCNS de Cherbourg was a professional tennis tournament played on indoor hard courts. It was part of the 2009 ATP Challenger Tour. It took place in Cherbourg-en-Cotentin, France between 2 and 8 March 2009.

== Singles main-draw entrants ==
=== Seeds ===
Nationality	Player	Ranking*	Seeding
BEL	Christophe Rochus	60	1
FRA	Arnaud Clément	73	2
FRA	Nicolas Mahut	131	3
FRA	Adrian Mannarino	132	4
FRA	Mathieu Montcourt	138	5
FRA	Josselin Ouanna	163	6
FRA	Édouard Roger-Vasselin	180	7
FRA	Alexandre Sidorenko	181	8

- Rankings are as of February 23, 2009.

=== Other entrants ===
The following players received wildcards into the singles main draw:

- (France) Jonathan Eysseric
- (France) Benoît Paire
- (France) Stéphane Robert
- (France) Guillaume Rufin

The following players received entry from the qualifying draw:

- (United Kingdom) Richard Bloomfield
- (France) Jean-Christophe Faurel
- (France) Romain Jouan
- (Monaco) Thomas Oger
- (Brazil) Eric Gomes (as a Lucky loser)
- (United States) Alex Kuznetsov (as a Lucky loser)

== Champions ==
=== Men's singles ===
(France) Arnaud Clément def. (France) Thierry Ascione, 6–2, 6–4

=== Men's doubles ===
(France) Arnaud Clément / (France) Édouard Roger-Vasselin def. (Austria) Martin Fischer / (Austria) Martin Slanar, 4–6, 6–2, [10–3]
