= 2011 Challenger DCNS de Cherbourg =

- Date: February 28 – March 6
- Edition: 18th
- Location: Cherbourg, France

Champions

Singles
- (Bulgaria) Grigor Dimitrov

Doubles
- (France) Pierre-Hugues Herbert / (France) Nicolas Renavand
← 2010 ·	Challenger La Manche	· 2012 →

The 2011 Challenger DCNS de Cherbourg was a professional tennis tournament played on indoor hard courts. It was the 18th edition of the tournament which is part of the 2011 ATP Challenger Tour. It took place in Cherbourg, France between February 28 and March 6, 2011.

== ATP entrants ==
=== Seeds ===
Country	Player	Rank^{1}	Seed
BUL	Grigor Dimitrov	81	1
FRA	Nicolas Mahut	82	2
FRA	Arnaud Clément	105	3
FRA	Édouard Roger-Vasselin	115	4
FRA	Benoît Paire	120	5
GER	Andreas Beck	129	6
RUS	Alexander Kudryavtsev	139	7
SUI	Stéphane Bohli	145	8

- Rankings are as of February 21, 2011.

=== Other entrants ===
The following players received wildcards into the singles main draw:

- (France) Kenny de Schepper
- (France) Jonathan Eysseric
- (France) Benoît Paire
- (France) Alexandre Sidorenko

The following players received entry as a Special Exempt into the singles main draw:

- (Germany) Stefan Seifert

The following players received entry from the qualifying draw:

- (Belgium) Niels Desein
- (Czech Republic) Jan Mertl
- (Netherlands) Matwé Middelkoop
- (France) Maxime Teixeira

== Champions ==
=== Singles ===
(Bulgaria) Grigor Dimitrov def. (France) Nicolas Mahut, 6–2, 7–6^{(7–4)}

=== Doubles ===
(France) Pierre-Hugues Herbert / (France) Nicolas Renavand def. (France) Nicolas Mahut / (France) Édouard Roger-Vasselin, 3–6, 6–4 [10–5]
