= 2010 Challenger DCNS de Cherbourg – Singles =

Singles
- 2010 Challenger DCNS de Cherbourg

Final
- Champion: (France) Nicolas Mahut
- Runner-up: (Luxembourg) Gilles Müller
- Score: 6–4, 6–3

Events
Singles	Doubles
← 2009 ·	Challenger La Manche	· 2011 →

Arnaud Clément was the defending champion, but he lost to Nicolas Mahut in the semifinals.
Mahut defeated Gilles Müller in the final, 6–4, 6–3.

== Seeds ==
1. (France) Arnaud Clément (semifinals)
2. (France) Josselin Ouanna (semifinals)
3. (United States) Kevin Kim (second round)
4. (Belgium) Kristof Vliegen (second round)
5. (France) David Guez (first round)
6. (Czech Republic) Jan Hernych (first round)
7. (France) Laurent Recouderc (quarterfinals)
8. (Switzerland) Stéphane Bohli (first round)

== Draw ==
=== Key ===
- Q = Qualifier
- WC = Wild card
- LL = Lucky loser
- Alt = Alternate
- SE = Special exempt
- PR = Protected ranking
- ITF = ITF entry
- JE = Junior exempt
- w/o = Walkover
- r = Retired
- d = Defaulted
- SR = Special ranking

=== Finals ===
Semifinals
1/WC	(France) Arnaud Clément	6^{9}	6	3
(France) Nicolas Mahut	7^{11}	2	6
WC	(Luxembourg) Gilles Müller	6	6
2	(France) Josselin Ouanna	2	3

Final
(France) Nicolas Mahut	6	6
WC	(Luxembourg) Gilles Müller	4	3

=== Top half ===
First round
1/WC	(France) A Clément	6	5	6
(Germany) T Kamke	1	7	4
(Italy) A Stoppini	5	4
(Germany) J Reister	7	6
(Italy) M Crugnola	0	0	r
(Czech Republic) L Rosol	6	1
(France) É Roger-Vasselin	6	6
6	(Czech Republic) J Hernych	0	3
3	(United States) K Kim	6	6
WC	(France) A Michon	2	2
(Croatia) R Karanušić	2	5
(France) N Mahut	6	7
Q	(France) F Martin	7^{7}	7^{7}
(Belgium) R Bemelmans	6^{4}	6^{4}
(France) A Sidorenko	6	6
5	(France) D Guez	2	3

Second round
1/WC	(France) A Clément	6	7^{7}
(Germany) J Reister	3	6^{4}
(Czech Republic) L Rosol	3	1
(France) É Roger-Vasselin	6	6
3	(United States) K Kim	4	3
(France) N Mahut	6	6
Q	(France) F Martin	6^{5}	1
(France) A Sidorenko	7^{7}	6

Quarterfinals
1/WC	(France) A Clément	7	6
(France) É Roger-Vasselin	5	1
(France) N Mahut	6
(France) A Sidorenko	4	r

Semifinals
1/WC	(France) A Clément	6^{9}	6	3
(France) N Mahut	7^{11}	2	6

=== Bottom half ===
First round
8	(Switzerland) S Bohli	4	6	5
(France) T Ascione	6	2	7
(Germany) A Begemann	6	5	6
Q	(Russia) A Kudryavtsev	3	7	4
WC	(Luxembourg) G Müller	7^{7}	5	7^{7}
Q	(France) R Jouan	6^{4}	7	6^{4}
(Austria) A Haider-Maurer	5	5
4	(Belgium) K Vliegen	7	7
7	(France) L Recouderc	7^{12}	7^{7}
Q	(Russia) K Kravchuk	6^{10}	6^{3}
WC	(France) J Eysseric	4	5
(Slovakia) D Hrbatý	6	7
(Netherlands) R Sluiter	6	3	1
(Belgium) N Desein	4	6	6
(United States) L Cook	4	2
2	(France) J Ouanna	6	6

Second round
(France) T Ascione	5	4
(Germany) A Begemann	7	6
WC	(Luxembourg) G Müller	7^{8}	7^{7}
4	(Belgium) K Vliegen	6^{6}	6^{5}
7	(France) L Recouderc	6	6^{1}	6
(Slovakia) D Hrbatý	3	7^{7}	1
(Belgium) N Desein	7^{7}	1	4
2	(France) J Ouanna	6^{2}	6	6

Quarterfinals
(Germany) A Begemann	5	4
WC	(Luxembourg) G Müller	7	6
7	(France) L Recouderc	4	4
2	(France) J Ouanna	6	6

Semifinals
WC	(Luxembourg) G Müller	6	6
2	(France) J Ouanna	2	3
