= 2012 Challenger La Manche – Singles =

Singles
- 2012 Challenger La Manche

Final
- Champion: (France) Josselin Ouanna
- Runner-up: (France) Maxime Teixeira
- Score: 6–3, 6–2

Events
Singles	Doubles
← 2011 ·	Challenger La Manche	· 2013 →

Grigor Dimitrov was the defending champion but decided not to participate.
Josselin Ouanna won the title, defeating Maxime Teixeira 6–3, 6–2 in the final.

== Seeds ==
1. (France) Édouard Roger-Vasselin (second round)
2. (Netherlands) Thomas Schoorel (semifinals)
3. (France) Marc Gicquel (second round)
4. (France) Florent Serra (first round)
5. (Russia) Alexander Kudryavtsev (first round, retired due to influenza)
6. (Netherlands) Igor Sijsling (second round, retired)
7. (France) Arnaud Clément (quarterfinals)
8. (Belgium) David Goffin (quarterfinals)

== Draw ==
=== Key ===
- Q = Qualifier
- WC = Wild card
- LL = Lucky loser
- Alt = Alternate
- SE = Special exempt
- PR = Protected ranking
- ITF = ITF entry
- JE = Junior exempt
- w/o = Walkover
- r = Retired
- d = Defaulted
- SR = Special ranking

=== Finals ===
Semifinals
(France) Maxime Teixeira	1	7^{7}	6
(Belarus) Uladzimir Ignatik	6	6^{3}	4
WC	(France) Josselin Ouanna	5	6	6
2	(Netherlands) Thomas Schoorel	7	3	4

Final
(France) Maxime Teixeira	3	2
WC	(France) Josselin Ouanna	6	6

=== Top half ===
First round
1	(France) É Roger-Vasselin	6	7
(Russia) K Kravchuk	4	5
WC	(France) P-H Herbert	6	6
Q	(United Kingdom) D Evans	3	0
(Serbia) D Lajović	4	4
(France) M Teixeira	6	6
(Germany) D Brown	7	4	3
6	(Netherlands) I Sijsling	5	6	6
3	(France) M Gicquel	6	7^{8}
(France) M Rodrigues	3	6^{6}
(Belarus) U Ignatik	6	3	6
WC	(France) R Jouan	4	6	3
(Belgium) Y Mertens	6^{8}	7	7^{7}
(France) J Dasnières de Veigy	7^{10}	5	6^{1}
(Italy) S Galvani	2	2
8	(Belgium) D Goffin	6	6

Second round
1	(France) É Roger-Vasselin	6	4	4
WC	(France) P-H Herbert	1	6	6
(France) M Teixeira	4	6	2
6	(Netherlands) I Sijsling	6	4	1^{r}
3	(France) M Gicquel	6^{2}	4
(Belarus) U Ignatik	7^{7}	6
(Belgium) Y Mertens	1	1
8	(Belgium) D Goffin	6	6

Quarterfinals
WC	(France) P-H Herbert	3	3
(France) M Teixeira	6	6
(Belarus) U Ignatik	6	6
8	(Belgium) D Goffin	1	4

Semifinals
(France) M Teixeira	1	7^{7}	6
(Belarus) U Ignatik	6	6^{3}	4

=== Bottom half ===
First round
5	(Russia) A Kudryavtsev	3	r
(France) K de Schepper	6
(Lithuania) L Grigelis	7^{7}	2	6
Q	(France) N Renavand	6^{4}	6	3
WC	(France) J Ouanna	6	6
Q	(Czech Republic) R Jebavý	3	2
Q	(Ukraine) I Marchenko	6	6
4	(France) F Serra	2	1
7	(France) A Clément	4	6	6
SE	(Poland) J Janowicz	6	3	4
(Switzerland) S Bohli	4	6	1
(Austria) M Fischer	6	3	6
SE	(Kazakhstan) E Korolev	2	6	5
WC	(France) A Sidorenko	6	4	7
LL	(Austria) P Oswald	7^{11}	3	5
2	(Netherlands) T Schoorel	6^{9}	6	7

Second round
(France) K de Schepper	6^{5}	6	6
(Lithuania) L Grigelis	7^{7}	1	4
WC	(France) J Ouanna	7^{7}	7
Q	(Ukraine) I Marchenko	6^{5}	5
7	(France) A Clément	7	7
(Austria) M Fischer	5	5
WC	(France) A Sidorenko	6^{4}	5
2	(Netherlands) T Schoorel	7^{7}	7

Quarterfinals
(France) K de Schepper	6^{4}	6^{5}
WC	(France) J Ouanna	7^{7}	7^{7}
7	(France) A Clément	5	3
2	(Netherlands) T Schoorel	7	6

Semifinals
WC	(France) J Ouanna	5	6	6
2	(Netherlands) T Schoorel	7	3	4
