= 2010 Challenger DCNS de Cherbourg =

Men's tennis tournament

- Date: March 1 – March 7
- Edition: 17th
- Location: Cherbourg-en-Cotentin, France

Champions

Singles
- (France) Nicolas Mahut

Doubles
- (France) Nicolas Mahut / (France) Édouard Roger-Vasselin
← 2009 ·	Challenger La Manche	· 2011 →

The 2010 Challenger DCNS de Cherbourg was a professional tennis tournament played on indoor hard courts. It was part of the 2010 ATP Challenger Tour. It took place in Cherbourg-Octeville, France between 1 and 7 March 2010.

== ATP entrants ==
=== Seeds ===
Nationality	Player	Ranking*	Seeding
FRA	Arnaud Clément	67	1
FRA	Josselin Ouanna	118	2
USA	Kevin Kim	123	3
BEL	Kristof Vliegen	127	4
FRA	David Guez	136	5
CZE	Jan Hernych	140	6
FRA	Laurent Recouderc	141	7
SUI	Stéphane Bohli	142	8

- Rankings are as of February 22.

=== Other entrants ===
The following players received wildcards into the singles main draw:

- (France) Arnaud Clément
- (France) Jonathan Eysseric
- (France) Axel Michon
- (Luxembourg) Gilles Müller

The following players received entry from the qualifying draw:

- (France) Romain Jouan
- (Russia) Konstantin Kravchuk
- (Russia) Alexander Kudryavtsev
- (France) Fabrice Martin

== Champions ==
=== Singles ===
(France) Nicolas Mahut def. (Luxembourg) Gilles Müller, 6–4, 6–3

=== Doubles ===
(France) Nicolas Mahut / (France) Édouard Roger-Vasselin def. (India) Harsh Mankad / (Canada) Adil Shamasdin, 6–2, 6–4
