= 2012 Challenger La Manche – Doubles =

Doubles
- 2012 Challenger La Manche

Final
- Champions: (Lithuania) Laurynas Grigelis (Belarus) Uladzimir Ignatik
- Runners-up: (Germany) Dustin Brown (United Kingdom) Jonathan Marray
- Score: 4–6, 7–6^{(11–9)}, [10–0]

Events
Singles	Doubles
← 2011 ·	Challenger La Manche	· 2013 →

Pierre-Hugues Herbert and Nicolas Renavand were the defending champions, but lost in the first round.
Laurynas Grigelis and Uladzimir Ignatik won the title, defeating Dustin Brown and Jonathan Marray 4–6, 7–6^{(11–9)}, [10–0] in the final.

== Seeds ==
1. (Germany) Martin Emmrich / (Germany) Philipp Marx (quarterfinals)
2. (Germany) Dustin Brown / (United Kingdom) Jonathan Marray (final)
3. (United Kingdom) Jamie Delgado / (United Kingdom) Ken Skupski (semifinals)
4. (Slovakia) Igor Zelenay / (Croatia) Lovro Zovko (quarterfinals)

== Draw ==
=== Key ===
- Q = Qualifier
- WC = Wild card
- LL = Lucky loser
- Alt = Alternate
- SE = Special exempt
- PR = Protected ranking
- ITF = ITF entry
- JE = Junior exempt
- w/o = Walkover
- r = Retired
- d = Defaulted
- SR = Special ranking

=== Draw ===
First round
1	(Germany) M Emmrich (Germany) P Marx	7	6
(France) K de Schepper (France) M Teixeira	5	4
(Sweden) J Brunström (Australia) E Junaid	6^{8}	6	[3]
Alt	(Lithuania) L Grigelis (Belarus) U Ignatik	7^{10}	4	[10]
4	(Slovakia) I Zelenay (Croatia) L Zovko	3	7^{7}	[10]
(Poland) T Bednarek (France) O Charroin	6	6^{2}	[7]
(United States) T Rettenmaier (Germany) S Stadler	6^{4}	5
(France) M Gicquel (France) É Roger-Vasselin	7^{7}	7
(United Kingdom) D Rice (United Kingdom) S Thornley	1	4
(Austria) M Fischer (Austria) P Oswald	6	6
(United Kingdom) C Eaton (United Kingdom) D Inglot	6^{3}	6^{5}
3	(United Kingdom) J Delgado (United Kingdom) K Skupski	7^{7}	7^{7}
WC	(France) A Sidorenko (France) Anthony Thiebot	4	4
WC	(France) R Jouan (France) F Martin	6	6
(France) P -Hugues Herbert (France) N Renavand	4	2
2	(Germany) D Brown (United Kingdom) J Marray	6	6

Quarterfinals
1	(Germany) M Emmrich (Germany) P Marx	4	2
Alt	(Lithuania) L Grigelis (Belarus) U Ignatik	6	6
4	(Slovakia) I Zelenay (Croatia) L Zovko	6	6^{3}	[8]
(France) M Gicquel (France) É Roger-Vasselin	4	7^{7}	[10]
(Austria) M Fischer (Austria) P Oswald	5	4
3	(United Kingdom) J Delgado (United Kingdom) K Skupski	7	6
WC	(France) R Jouan (France) F Martin	4	3
2	(Germany) D Brown (United Kingdom) J Marray	6	6

Semifinals
Alt	(Lithuania) L Grigelis (Belarus) U Ignatik	6	5	[15]
(France) M Gicquel (France) É Roger-Vasselin	4	7	[13]
3	(United Kingdom) J Delgado (United Kingdom) K Skupski	6^{2}	3
2	(Germany) D Brown (United Kingdom) J Marray	7^{7}	6

Final
Alt	(Lithuania) L Grigelis (Belarus) U Ignatik	4	7^{11}	[10]
2	(Germany) D Brown (United Kingdom) J Marray	6	6^{9}	[0]
