= 2009 Challenger DCNS de Cherbourg – Doubles =

Doubles
- 2009 Challenger DCNS de Cherbourg

Final
- Champions: (France) Arnaud Clément (France) Édouard Roger-Vasselin
- Runners-up: (Austria) Martin Fischer (Austria) Martin Slanar.
- Score: 4–6, 6–2, [10–3]

Events
Singles	Doubles
← 2008 ·	Challenger La Manche	· 2010 →

Florin Mergea and Horia Tecău were the defending champions, but they chose not to defend their title. Arnaud Clément and Édouard Roger-Vasselin won in the final 4–6, 6–2, [10–3], against Martin Fischer and Martin Slanar.

== Seeds ==
1. (United States) Brian Battistone / (India) Harsh Mankad (first round)
2. (Austria) Martin Fischer / (Austria) Martin Slanar (final)
3. (United Kingdom) James Auckland / (Brazil) Márcio Torres (quarterfinals)
4. (France) Arnaud Clément / (France) Édouard Roger-Vasselin (champions)

== Draw ==
=== Key ===
- Q = Qualifier
- WC = Wild card
- LL = Lucky loser
- Alt = Alternate
- SE = Special exempt
- PR = Protected ranking
- ITF = ITF entry
- JE = Junior exempt
- w/o = Walkover
- r = Retired
- d = Defaulted
- SR = Special ranking

=== Draw ===
First round
1	(United States) B Battistone (India) H Mankad	4	6	[7]
(France) M Montcourt (France) A Sidorenko	6	3	[10]
ALT	(United Kingdom) R Bloomfield (United States) S Oudsema	2	6	[7]
(France) O Charroin (Poland) D Olejniczak	6	3	[10]
4	(France) A Clément (France) É Roger-Vasselin	6	6
ALT	(France) Alexandre Penaud (France) J-B Perlant	4	1
(Italy) R Ghedin (Italy) P Lorenzi	4	7^{7}	[4]
(United States) A Kuznetsov (Russia) D Matsukevich	6	6^{5}	[10]
(United Kingdom) J Delgado (Germany) D Meffert	6	6
(United States) T Rettenmaier (United States) M Yani	3	1
ALT	(India) R Gajjar (India) P Raja	4	1
3	(United Kingdom) J Auckland (Brazil) M Torres	6	6
(Switzerland) G Bastl (France) N Tourte	7	4	[10]
WC	(France) J Haehnel (France) J Jeanpierre	5	6	[7]
WC	(France) R Jouan (France) Pierrick Ysern	7	4	[4]
2	(Austria) M Fischer (Austria) M Slanar	5	6	[10]

Quarterfinals
(France) M Montcourt (France) A Sidorenko	6^{8}	5
(France) O Charroin (Poland) D Olejniczak	7^{10}	7
4	(France) A Clément (France) É Roger-Vasselin
(United States) A Kuznetsov (Russia) D Matsukevich	w/o
(United Kingdom) J Delgado (Germany) D Meffert	6	2	[10]
3	(United Kingdom) J Auckland (Brazil) M Torres	4	6	[7]
(Switzerland) G Bastl (France) N Tourte	4	4
2	(Austria) M Fischer (Austria) M Slanar	6	6

Semifinals
(France) O Charroin (Poland) D Olejniczak	5	0
4	(France) A Clément (France) É Roger-Vasselin	7	6
(United Kingdom) J Delgado (Germany) D Meffert	6	3	[6]
2	(Austria) M Fischer (Austria) M Slanar	4	6	[10]

Finals
4	(France) A Clément (France) É Roger-Vasselin	4	6	[10]
2	(Austria) M Fischer (Austria) M Slanar	6	2	[3]
