= 2011 Valle d'Aosta Open =

Tennis tournament

- Date: 31 January – 6 February
- Edition: 1st
- Location: Courmayeur, Italy

Champions

Singles
- (France) Nicolas Mahut

Doubles
- (France) Marc Gicquel / (France) Nicolas Mahut
- Valle d'Aosta Open

The 2011 Valle d'Aosta Open was a professional tennis tournament played on hard courts. It was the first edition of the tournament which was part of the 2011 ATP Challenger Tour. It took place in Courmayeur, Italy between 31 January – 6 February 2011.

== ATP entrants ==
=== Seeds ===
Country	Player	Rank^{1}	Seed
ITA	Simone Bolelli	104	1
BEL	Olivier Rochus	111	2
LUX	Gilles Müller	122	3
FRA	Nicolas Mahut	132	4
FRA	Benoît Paire	145	5
SVK	Martin Kližan	156	6
POL	Jerzy Janowicz	159	7
FRA	Vincent Millot	160	8

- Rankings are as of January 17, 2011.

=== Other entrants ===
The following players received wildcards into the singles main draw:

- (Italy) Claudio Grassi
- (Italy) Tommaso Metti
- (Italy) Luca Vanni
- (Italy) Matthieu Vierin

The following players received special entrants into the singles main draw:

- (Switzerland) Alexander Sadecky
- (France) Nicolas Renavand

The following players received entry from the qualifying draw:

- (Lithuania) Laurynas Grigelis
- (Italy) Gianluca Naso
- (France) Clément Reix
- (France) Élie Rousset

The following players received entry as a lucky loser into the singles main draw:

- (Italy) Andrea Stoppini

== Champions ==
=== Singles ===
(France) Nicolas Mahut def. (Luxembourg) Gilles Müller, 7–6(4), 6–4

=== Doubles ===
(France) Marc Gicquel / (France) Nicolas Mahut def. (France) Olivier Charroin / (France) Alexandre Renard, 6–3, 6–4
