= 2012 Challenger La Manche =

- Date: February 27 – March 4
- Edition: 19th
- Location: Cherbourg, France

Champions

Singles
- (France) Josselin Ouanna

Doubles
- (Lithuania) Laurynas Grigelis / (Belarus) Uladzimir Ignatik
- Challenger La Manche

The 2012 Challenger La Manche was a professional tennis tournament played on indoor hard courts. It was the 19th edition of the tournament which was part of the 2012 ATP Challenger Tour. It took place in Cherbourg, France between February 27 and March 4, 2012.

== ATP entrants ==
=== Seeds ===
Country	Player	Rank^{1}	Seed
FRA	Édouard Roger-Vasselin	95	1
NED	Thomas Schoorel	139	2
FRA	Marc Gicquel	142	3
FRA	Florent Serra	143	4
RUS	Alexander Kudryavtsev	145	5
NED	Igor Sijsling	147	6
FRA	Arnaud Clément	155	7
BEL	David Goffin	164	8

- Rankings are as of February 20, 2012.

=== Other entrants ===
The following players received wildcards into the singles main draw:

- (France) Pierre-Hugues Herbert
- (France) Romain Jouan
- (France) Josselin Ouanna
- (France) Alexandre Sidorenko

The following players received entry as a special exempt into the singles main draw:

- (Poland) Jerzy Janowicz
- (Kazakhstan) Evgeny Korolev

The following players received entry from the qualifying draw:

- (United Kingdom) Daniel Evans
- (Czech Republic) Roman Jebavý
- (Ukraine) Illya Marchenko
- (France) Nicolas Renavand

== Champions ==
=== Singles ===
(France) Josselin Ouanna def. (France) Maxime Teixeira, 6–3, 6–2

=== Doubles ===
(Lithuania) Laurynas Grigelis / (Belarus) Uladzimir Ignatik def. (Germany) Dustin Brown / (United Kingdom) Jonathan Marray 4–6, 7–6^{(11–9)}, [10–0]
