= 2011 Valle d'Aosta Open – Doubles =

Doubles
- 2011 Valle d'Aosta Open

Final
- Champions: (France) Marc Gicquel (France) Nicolas Mahut
- Runners-up: (France) Olivier Charroin (France) Alexandre Renard
- Score: 6–3, 6–4

Events
Singles	Doubles
← 2010 ·	Valle d'Aosta Open	· 2012 →

Marc Gicquel and Nicolas Mahut won the title, by defeating their compatriots Olivier Charroin and Alexandre Renard 6–3, 6–4 in the final.

== Seeds ==
1. (Germany) Martin Emmrich / (Poland) Mateusz Kowalczyk (semifinals)
2. (United Kingdom) Jamie Delgado / (United Kingdom) Jonathan Marray (first round)
3. (Italy) Alessandro Motti / (India) Purav Raja (first round)
4. (France) Marc Gicquel / (France) Nicolas Mahut (champions)

== Draw ==
=== Key ===
- Q = Qualifier
- WC = Wild card
- LL = Lucky loser
- Alt = Alternate
- SE = Special exempt
- PR = Protected ranking
- ITF = ITF entry
- JE = Junior exempt
- w/o = Walkover
- r = Retired
- d = Defaulted
- SR = Special ranking

=== Draw ===
First round
1	(Germany) M Emmrich (Poland) M Kowalczyk	6	6
WC	(Italy) Eric Crepaldi (Italy) Matthieu Vierin	0	2
(France) V Millot (France) Clément Reix	4	5
(Belgium) R Bemelmans (Slovakia) M Kližan	6	7
4	(France) M Gicquel (France) N Mahut	6	6
(France) Grégoire Burquier (France) Laurent Rochette	2	3
(Poland) J Janowicz (Portugal) J Sousa	4	4
(Germany) M Bachinger (Germany) D Kindlmann	6	6
(Philippines) TC Huey (Netherlands) M Middelkoop	4	4
(France) O Charroin (France) Alexandre Renard	6	6
WC	(Italy) A Brizzi (Italy) F Colangelo	3	6	[11]
3	(Italy) A Motti (India) P Raja	6	3	[9]
(Italy) Claudio Grassi (Italy) Luca Vanni	6	6
(Italy) G Naso (Italy) M Viola	1	3
WC	(Italy) Andrea Falgheri (Lithuania) L Grigelis	6	3	[12]
2	(United Kingdom) J Delgado (United Kingdom) J Marray	3	6	[10]

Quarterfinals
1	(Germany) M Emmrich (Poland) M Kowalczyk	7	6
(Belgium) R Bemelmans (Slovakia) M Kližan	6^{4}	3
4	(France) M Gicquel (France) N Mahut	6	3	[10]
(Germany) M Bachinger (Germany) D Kindlmann	3	6	[7]
(France) O Charroin (France) Alexandre Renard	6	6
WC	(Italy) A Brizzi (Italy) F Colangelo	1	4
(Italy) Claudio Grassi (Italy) Luca Vanni	6^{7}	4
WC	(Italy) Andrea Falgheri (Lithuania) L Grigelis	7	6

Semifinals
1	(Germany) M Emmrich (Poland) M Kowalczyk	3	2
4	(France) M Gicquel (France) N Mahut	6	6
(France) O Charroin (France) Alexandre Renard	w/o
WC	(Italy) Andrea Falgheri (Lithuania) L Grigelis

Final
4	(France) M Gicquel (France) N Mahut	6	6
(France) O Charroin (France) Alexandre Renard	3	4
