= 2011 Valle d'Aosta Open – Singles =

Singles
- 2011 Valle d'Aosta Open

Final
- Champion: (France) Nicolas Mahut
- Runner-up: (Luxembourg) Gilles Müller
- Score: 7–6^{(7–4)}, 6–4

Events
Singles	Doubles
← 2010 ·	Valle d'Aosta Open	· 2012 →

Nicolas Mahut won the title, defeating Gilles Müller 7–6^{(7–4)}, 6–4 in the final.

== Seeds ==
1. (Italy) Simone Bolelli (second round)
2. (Belgium) Olivier Rochus (quarterfinals)
3. (Luxembourg) Gilles Müller (final)
4. (France) Nicolas Mahut (champion)
5. (France) Benoît Paire (second round)
6. (Slovakia) Martin Kližan (quarterfinals)
7. (Poland) Jerzy Janowicz (semifinals)
8. (France) Vincent Millot (first round)

== Draw ==
=== Key ===
- Q = Qualifier
- WC = Wild card
- LL = Lucky loser
- Alt = Alternate
- ITF = ITF entry
- PR = Protected ranking
- SR = Special ranking
- SE = Special exempt
- JE = Junior exempt
- JR = Junior Accelerator Programme entrant
- CO = College Accelerator Programme entrant
- NG = Next Gen Accelerator Program entrant
- w/o = Walkover
- r = Retired
- d = Defaulted

=== Finals ===
Semifinals
(Germany) Matthias Bachinger	6^{2}	4
4	(France) Nicolas Mahut	7	6
3	(Luxembourg) Gilles Müller	4	6	6
7	(Poland) Jerzy Janowicz	6	4	1

Final
4	(France) Nicolas Mahut	7	6
3	(Luxembourg) Gilles Müller	6^{4}	4

=== Top half ===
First round
1	(Italy) S Bolelli	6	6
WC	(Italy) Tommaso Metti	2	1
Q	(Lithuania) L Grigelis	7	6
(Netherlands) M Middelkoop	6^{5}	4
(Germany) M Bachinger	7	6
(France) M Gicquel	6^{3}	2
Q	(France) Clément Reix	3	6	3
5	(France) B Paire	6	3	6
4	(France) N Mahut	7	7
(Germany) D Kindlmann	6^{4}	6^{4}
(Italy) M Viola	3	2
Q	(Italy) G Naso	6	6
(Belgium) R Bemelmans	7	6^{5}	6
WC	(Italy) Luca Vanni	6^{5}	7	3
(France) R Jouan	6	7
8	(France) V Millot	3	6^{4}

Second round
1	(Italy) S Bolelli	7	3	6^{3}
Q	(Lithuania) L Grigelis	5	6	7
(Germany) M Bachinger	6	3	7
5	(France) B Paire	3	6	6^{3}
4	(France) N Mahut	6	6
Q	(Italy) G Naso	3	4
(Belgium) R Bemelmans	7	4	6
(France) R Jouan	6^{8}	6	2

Quarterfinals
Q	(Lithuania) L Grigelis	2	1
(Germany) M Bachinger	6	6
4	(France) N Mahut	7	1	7
(Belgium) R Bemelmans	6^{1}	6	6^{3}

Semifinals
(Germany) M Bachinger	6^{2}	4
4	(France) N Mahut	7	6

=== Bottom half ===
First round
6	(Slovakia) M Kližan	6	6
SE	(Switzerland) A Sadecky	4	4
(Germany) S Rieschick	6	6
SE	(France) Nicolas Renavand	4	0
(France) Laurent Rochette	4	7	3
LL	(Italy) A Stoppini	6	6^{2}	6
(Italy) A Brizzi	3	3
3	(Luxembourg) G Müller	6	6
7	(Poland) J Janowicz	6	7
(France) G Burquier	4	5
Q	(France) Élie Rousset	2	4
(Germany) B Knittel	6	6
WC	(Italy) Claudio Grassi	6	3	5
(Portugal) J Sousa	3	6	7
WC	(Italy) Matthieu Vierin	0	0
2	(Belgium) O Rochus	6	6

Second round
6	(Slovakia) M Kližan	6	6
(Germany) S Rieschick	1	1
LL	(Italy) A Stoppini	4	1
3	(Luxembourg) G Müller	6	6
7	(Poland) J Janowicz	6	6^{5}	6
(Germany) B Knittel	3	7	1
(Portugal) J Sousa	6	4	4
2	(Belgium) O Rochus	3	6	6

Quarterfinals
6	(Slovakia) M Kližan	6^{4}	6^{0}
3	(Luxembourg) G Müller	7	7
7	(Poland) J Janowicz	6	6
2	(Belgium) O Rochus	3	3

Semifinals
3	(Luxembourg) G Müller	4	6	6
7	(Poland) J Janowicz	6	4	1
