= 2009 Challenger DCNS de Cherbourg – Singles =

Singles
- 2009 Challenger DCNS de Cherbourg

Final
- Champion: (France) Arnaud Clément
- Runner-up: (France) Thierry Ascione
- Score: 6–2, 6–4

Events
Singles	Doubles
← 2008 ·	Challenger La Manche	· 2010 →

Thierry Ascione was the defending champion, but lost in the final 2–6, 4–6, to Arnaud Clément.

== Seeds ==
1. (Belgium) Christophe Rochus (first round)
2. (France) Arnaud Clément (champion)
3. (France) Nicolas Mahut (quarterfinals)
4. (France) Adrian Mannarino (semifinals)
5. (France) Mathieu Montcourt (second round)
6. (France) Josselin Ouanna (withdrew)
7. (France) Édouard Roger-Vasselin (semifinals)
8. (France) Alexandre Sidorenko (second round)

== Draw ==
=== Key ===
- Q = Qualifier
- WC = Wild card
- LL = Lucky loser
- Alt = Alternate
- SE = Special exempt
- PR = Protected ranking
- ITF = ITF entry
- JE = Junior exempt
- w/o = Walkover
- r = Retired
- d = Defaulted
- SR = Special ranking

=== Final four ===
Semifinals
(France) Thierry Ascione	1	6	7
7	(France) Édouard Roger-Vasselin	6	3	5
4	(France) Adrian Mannarino	1	2
2	(France) Arnaud Clément	6	6

Final
(France) Thierry Ascione	2	4
2	(France) Arnaud Clément	6	6

=== Top half ===
First round
1	(Belgium) C Rochus	6^{7}	3
(France) T Ascione	7^{9}	6
(Austria) M Slanar	6	6
LL	(Brazil) Eric Gomes	1	2
(Germany) D Meffert	4	6	6
(Italy) S Galvani	6	2	1
WC	(France) B Paire	3	4
5	(France) M Montcourt	6	6
3	(France) N Mahut	3	6	6
(Italy) P Lorenzi	6	3	2
(Poland) D Olejniczak	3	2
(Germany) T Kamke	6	6
(Italy) R Ghedin	2	6	1
(France) L Recouderc	6	4	6
WC	(France) S Robert	3	6^{3}
7	(France) É Roger-Vasselin	6	7^{7}

Second round
(France) T Ascione	6	6
(Austria) M Slanar	1	4
(Germany) D Meffert	6	5	6
5	(France) M Montcourt	4	7	3
3	(France) N Mahut
(Germany) T Kamke	w/o
(France) L Recouderc	7	1	3
7	(France) É Roger-Vasselin	5	6	6

Quarterfinals
(France) T Ascione	6	6^{5}	7^{7}
(Germany) D Meffert	4	7^{7}	6^{3}
3	(France) N Mahut	6^{5}	6	3
7	(France) É Roger-Vasselin	7^{7}	4	6

Semifinals
(France) T Ascione	1	6	7
7	(France) É Roger-Vasselin	6	3	5

=== Bottom half ===
First round
8	(France) A Sidorenko	5
WC	(France) G Rufin	4	r
(Argentina) M Alund	2	1
Q	(France) R Jouan	6	6
(United States) S Jenkins	6	6
Q	(France) J-C Faurel	3	1
Q	(United Kingdom) R Bloomfield	4	2
4	(France) A Mannarino	6	6
LL	(United States) A Kuznetsov	1	3
(Austria) M Fischer	6	6
Q	(Monaco) T Oger	3	6^{4}
(Switzerland) G Bastl	6	7^{7}
(Germany) J Reister	6	6
(United States) M Yani	3	2
WC	(France) J Eysseric	2	1
2	(France) A Clément	6	6

Second round
8	(France) A Sidorenko	3	4
Q	(France) R Jouan	6	6
(United States) S Jenkins	2	4
4	(France) A Mannarino	6	6
(Austria) M Fischer	6	2	3
(Switzerland) G Bastl	3	6	6
(Germany) J Reister	6^{5}	6^{9}
2	(France) A Clément	7^{7}	7^{11}

Quarterfinals
Q	(France) R Jouan	3	6^{0}
4	(France) A Mannarino	6	7^{7}
(Switzerland) G Bastl	1	6^{5}
2	(France) A Clément	6	7^{7}

Semifinals
4	(France) A Mannarino	1	2
2	(France) A Clément	6	6
