= List of France Davis Cup team representatives =

This is a list of tennis players who have represented the France Davis Cup team in an official Davis Cup match. France have taken part in the competition since 1904.

== Players ==
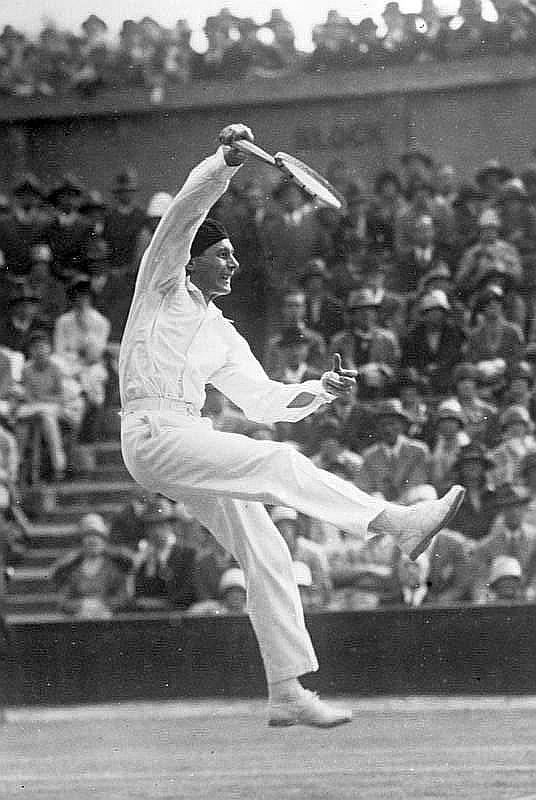
Jean Borotra

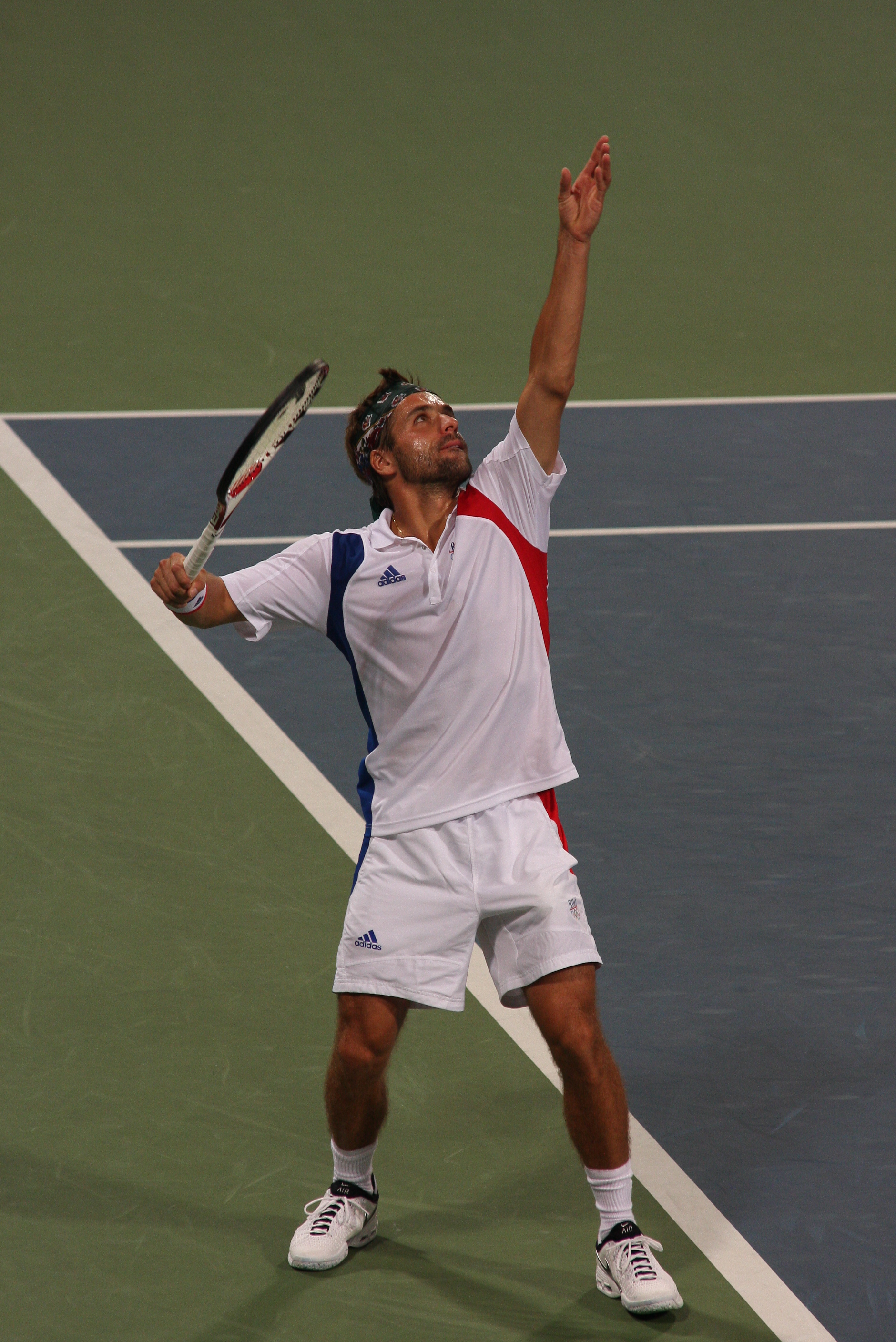
Arnaud Clément

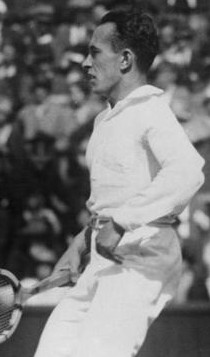
Henri Cochet

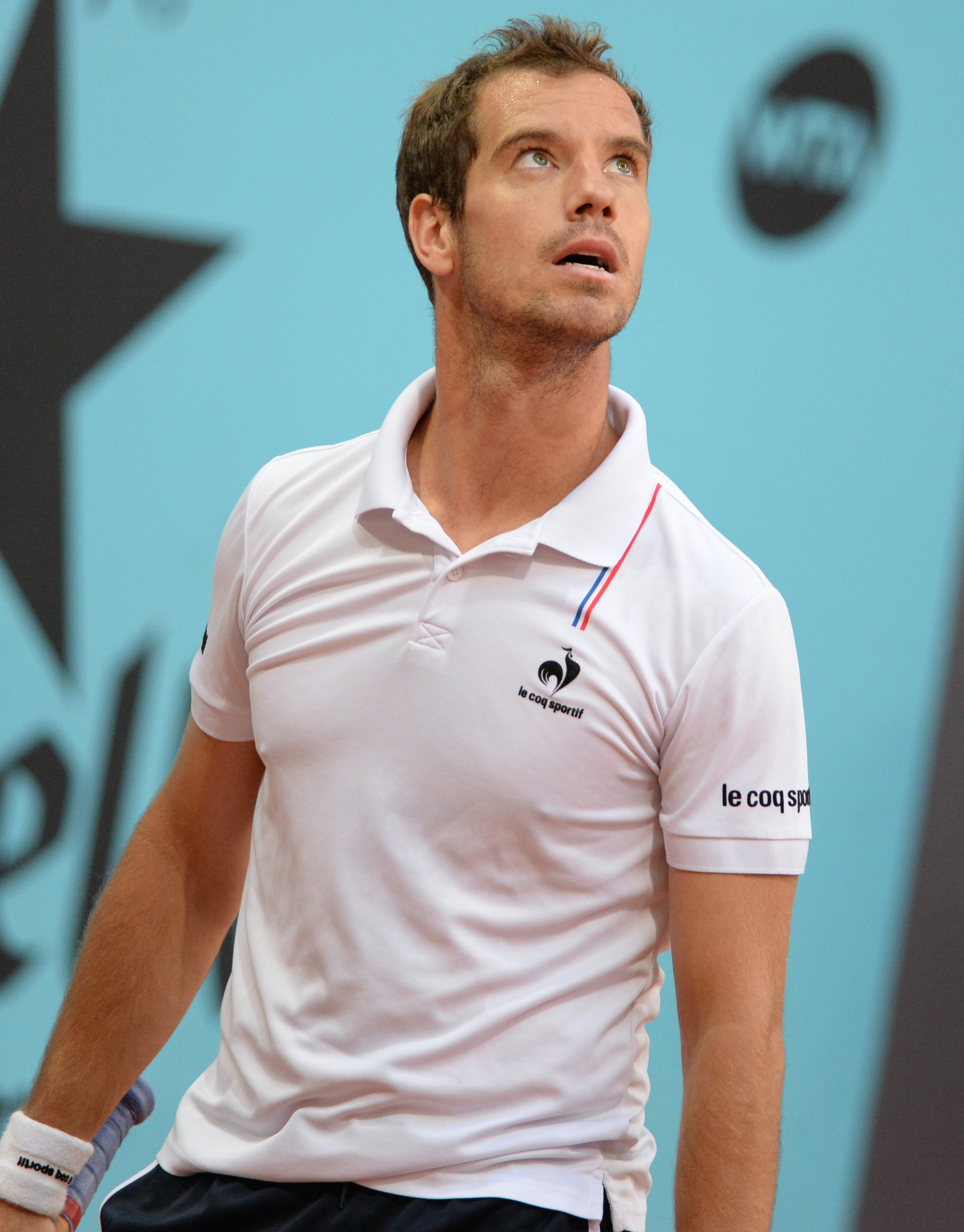
Richard Gasquet

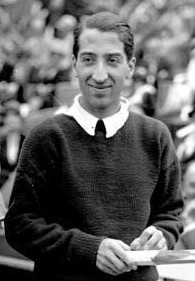
René Lacoste

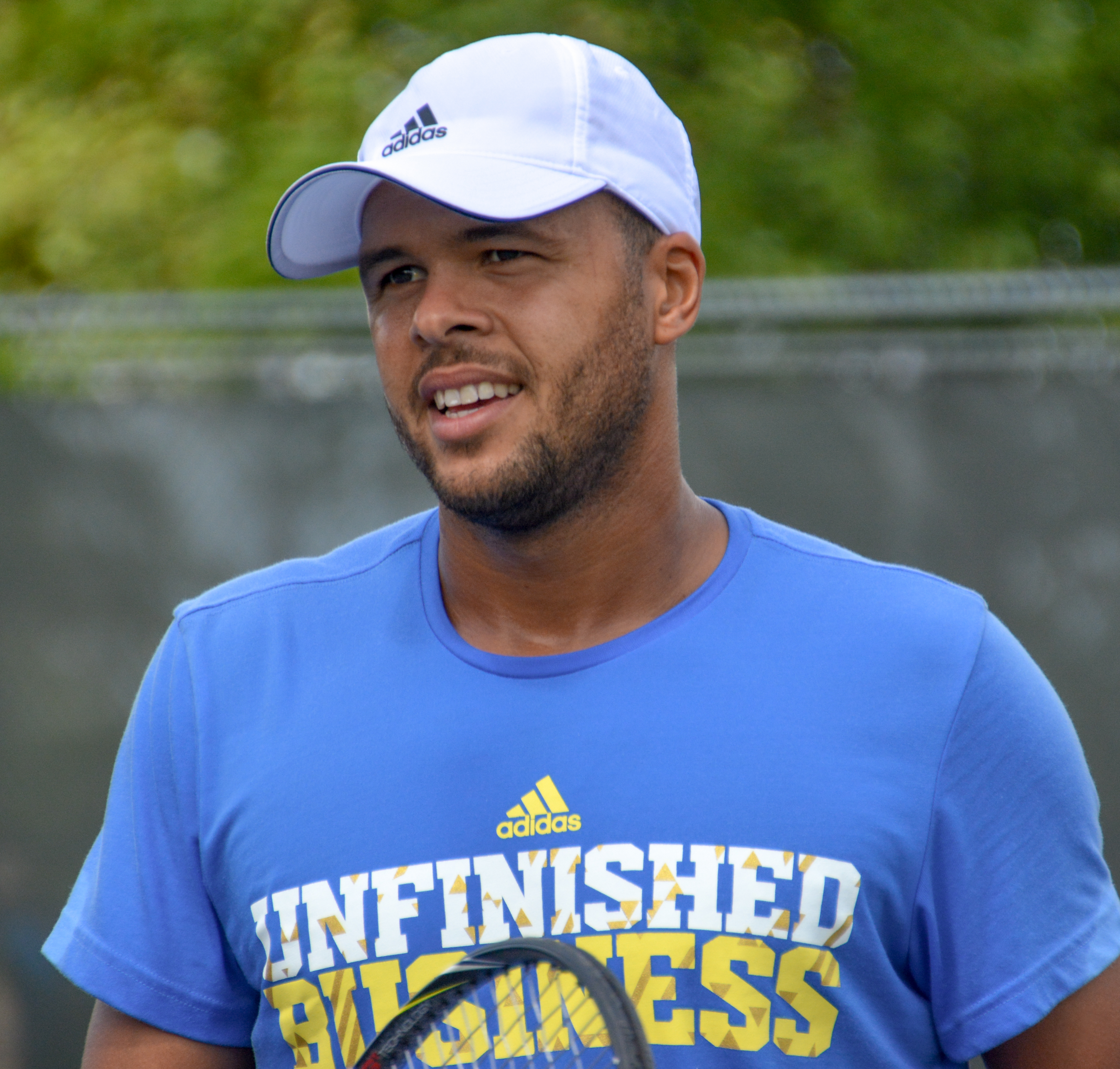
Jo-Wilfried Tsonga

Player	W-L (Total)	W-L (Singles)	W-L (Doubles)	Ties	Debut
Robert Abdesselam	11–10	6–9	5–1	14	1947
Thierry Ascione	0–1	0–1	0–0	1	2004
Paul Ayme	1–2	0–2	1–0	1	1904
Jean-Claude Barclay	3–4	3–3	0–1	4	1962
Pierre Barthès	19–14	14–9	5–5	15	1964
Dominique Bedel	2–1	2–0	0–1	2	1979
Tarik Benhabiles	1–0	0–0	1–0	1	1987
Julien Benneteau	5–2	2–1	3–1	4	2010
Marcel Bernard	29–13	13–8	16–5	25	1935
Patrice Beust	7–6	0–0	7–6	13	1963
Jean-François Blanchy	3–2	3–1	0–1	2	1923
Arnaud Boetsch	16–6	11–6	5–0	11	1991
Henri Bolelli	8–3	2–0	6–3	9	1938
Benjamin Bonzi	1–0	1–0	0–0	1	2022
Jean Borotra	36–18	19–12	17–6	32	1922
Christian Boussus	10–9	10–9	0–0	10	1934
Jacques Brugnon	26–11	4–2	22–9	31	1921
Jean-François Caujolle	1–0	0–0	1–0	1	1974
Thierry Champion	0–2	0–2	0–0	1	1992
Jean-Baptiste Chanfreau	3–1	0–0	3–1	4	1970
Jérémy Chardy	3–0	3–0	0–0	2	2009
Arnaud Clément	20–11	12–9	8–2	18	2000
Henri Cochet	44–14	34–8	10–6	26	1922
Daniel Contet	9–8	1–1	8–7	16	1961
Jean Couiteas de Faucamberge	2–1	2–1	0–0	2	1922
Pierre Darmon	47–21	44–17	3–4	34	1956
Éric Deblicker	0–2	0–2	0–0	1	1978
Max Decugis	6–10	3–8	3–2	6	1904
Olivier Delaître	5–3	1–0	4–3	7	1994
Bernard Destremau	26–16	25–14	1–2	24	1936
Patrice Dominguez	15–9	10–4	5–5	11	1971
Jean Ducos de la Haille	3–2	0–0	3–2	5	1953
Pierre-Hugues Herbert	11–2	0–1	11–1	12	2016
Nicolas Escudé	18–5	13–3	5–2	13	1998
Paul Feret	2–0	2–0	0–0	2	1925
Jean-Philippe Fleurian	1–1	1–0	0–1	2	1986
Guy Forget	38–11	17–7	21–4	26	1984
Richard Gasquet	6–8	6–7	0–1	10	2005
Maurice Germot	1–6	0–4	1–2	3	1905
Rodolphe Gilbert	0–1	0–1	0–0	1	1993
Andre Gobert	3–10	2–7	1–3	5	1912
Jérôme Golmard	5–2	4–2	1–0	6	1995
Georges Goven	9–6	9–5	0–1	9	1967
Jean-Noël Grinda	7–6	2–1	5–5	10	1959
Sébastien Grosjean	16–10	16–9	0–1	16	1999
Jean-Louis Haillet	4–2	2–2	2–0	2	1977
Robert Haillet	30–13	29–13	1–0	23	1952
Pierre Hirsch	0–1	0–1	0–0	1	1923
François Jauffret	43–27	34–17	9–10	35	1964
René Lacoste	40–11	32–8	8–3	26	1923
Pierre Henri Landry	1–0	1–0	0–0	1	1926
William Laurentz	3–7	1–4	2–3	5	1912
Jean Lesueur	0–1	0–0	0–1	1	1938
Henri Leconte	41–25	24–20	17–5	28	1982
Michaël Llodra	21–11	3–5	18–6	24	2002
Nicolas Mahut	15–4	1–2	14–2	16	2015
Adrian Mannarino	3–2	3–2	0–0	4	2018
Paul-Henri Mathieu	4–8	4–8	0–0	6	2002
Andre Merlin	6–4	6–4	0–0	5	1933
Jean-Claude Molinari	9–3	3–1	6–2	10	1954
Gaël Monfils	6–2	6–2	0–0	7	2009
Gilles Moretton	3–6	0–3	3–3	7	1979
Wanaro N'Godrella	2–0	0–0	2–0	2	1973
Yannick Noah	39–22	26–15	13–7	22	1978
Benoît Paire	1–1	1–1	0–0	2	2018
Pierre Pellizza	10–4	5–2	5–2	9	1938
Yvon Petra	15–7	11–3	4–4	12	1937
Thierry Pham	2–0	2–0	0–0	1	1986
Gérard Pilet	6–3	6–3	0–0	6	1959
Cédric Pioline	22–14	18–11	4–3	21	1994
Pascal Portes	5–9	4–6	1–3	6	1979
Lucas Pouille	7–4	7–4	0–0	8	2016
Patrick Proisy	12–9	10–7	2–2	10	1971
Guillaume Raoux	11–2	4–1	7–1	8	1996
Arthur Rinderknech	2–1	1–1	1–0	2	2021
Paul Rémy	35–18	17–12	18–6	25	1949
Jacques Renavand	3–2	2–0	1–2	4	1961
Christophe Roger-Vasselin	2–2	1–2	1–0	2	1980
Lionel Roux	0–1	0–1	0–0	1	1997
Jean-Loup Rouyer	2–1	0–0	2–1	3	1970
Jean-Pierre Samazeuilh	3–2	2–1	1–1	3	1921
Fabrice Santoro	15–11	6–6	9–5	17	1991
Gilles Simon	3–5	3–5	0–0	6	2009
Jacques Thomas	2–1	2–0	0–1	3	1949
Jo-Wilfried Tsonga	12–2	9–2	3–0	7	2008
Thierry Tulasne	10–9	9–9	1–0	10	1981
Éric Winogradsky	1–0	0–0	1–0	1	1986
