= 2010 Challenger DCNS de Cherbourg – Doubles =

Doubles
- 2010 Challenger DCNS de Cherbourg

Final
- Champions: (France) Nicolas Mahut (France) Édouard Roger-Vasselin
- Runners-up: (India) Harsh Mankad (Canada) Adil Shamasdin
- Score: 6–2, 6–4

Events
Singles	Doubles
← 2009 ·	Challenger La Manche	· 2011 →

Arnaud Clément and Édouard Roger-Vasselin were the defending champions, but they elected to defend their title with different partners.
Clément partnered up with David Guez, but they withdrew before their quarterfinal match against Harsh Mankad and Adil Shamasdin.
Roger-Vasselin partnered up with Nicolas Mahut and they won in the final 6–2, 6–4, over Mankad and Shamasdin.

== Seeds ==
1. (United Kingdom) Jonathan Marray / (United Kingdom) Jamie Murray (semifinals)
2. (United Kingdom) Jamie Delgado / (Croatia) Lovro Zovko (first round)
3. (France) Nicolas Mahut / (France) Édouard Roger-Vasselin (champions)
4. (India) Harsh Mankad / (Canada) Adil Shamasdin (final)

== Draw ==
=== Key ===
- Q = Qualifier
- WC = Wild card
- LL = Lucky loser
- Alt = Alternate
- SE = Special exempt
- PR = Protected ranking
- ITF = ITF entry
- JE = Junior exempt
- w/o = Walkover
- r = Retired
- d = Defaulted
- SR = Special ranking

=== Draw ===
First round
1	(United Kingdom) J Marray (United Kingdom) J Murray	6	7
(Czech Republic) J Hernych (Czech Republic) J Minář	3	5
(Slovakia) D Hrbatý (Czech Republic) L Rosol	6	7
(Poland) T Bednarek (South Africa) I van der Merwe	3	5
4	(India) H Mankad (Canada) A Shamasdin	3	6	[10]
WC	(France) A Sidorenko (France) A Thiebot	6	3	[6]
(United States) L Cook (United States) K Kim	4	2
(France) A Clément (France) D Guez	6	6
(United States) D Martin (Austria) M Slanar	6	7
(Germany) T Kamke (Germany) J Reister	4	5
(Russia) K Kravchuk (Russia) A Kudryavtsev	6^{4}	3
3	(France) N Mahut (France) É Roger-Vasselin	7^{7}	6
WC	(France) O Charroin (France) R Jouan	0	4
WC	(Luxembourg) G Müller (Luxembourg) M Scheidweiler	6	6
(Germany) M Emmrich (Sweden) A Siljeström	7^{7}	6^{5}	[12]
2	(United Kingdom) J Delgado (Croatia) L Zovko	6^{5}	7^{7}	[10]

Quarterfinals
1	(United Kingdom) J Marray (United Kingdom) J Murray	6	6
(Slovakia) D Hrbatý (Czech Republic) L Rosol	4	3
4	(India) H Mankad (Canada) A Shamasdin
(France) A Clément (France) D Guez	w/o
(United States) D Martin (Austria) M Slanar	6	3	[6]
3	(France) N Mahut (France) É Roger-Vasselin	2	6	[10]
WC	(Luxembourg) G Müller (Luxembourg) M Scheidweiler	6^{3}	6^{5}
(Germany) M Emmrich (Sweden) A Siljeström	7^{7}	7^{7}

Semifinals
1	(United Kingdom) J Marray (United Kingdom) J Murray	7^{7}	6^{5}	[5]
4	(India) H Mankad (Canada) A Shamasdin	6^{2}	7^{7}	[10]
3	(France) N Mahut (France) É Roger-Vasselin	7	3	[10]
(Germany) M Emmrich (Sweden) A Siljeström	5	6	[7]

Finals
4	(India) H Mankad (Canada) A Shamasdin	2	4
3	(France) N Mahut (France) É Roger-Vasselin	6	6
