= 2011 Challenger DCNS de Cherbourg – Doubles =

Doubles
- 2011 Challenger DCNS de Cherbourg

Final
- Champions: (France) Pierre-Hugues Herbert (France) Nicolas Renavand
- Runners-up: (France) Nicolas Mahut (France) Édouard Roger-Vasselin
- Score: 3–6, 6–4, [10–5]

Events
Singles	Doubles
← 2010 ·	Challenger La Manche	· 2012 →

Nicolas Mahut and Édouard Roger-Vasselin were the defending champions, but lost to Pierre-Hugues Herbert and Nicolas Renavand 6–3, 4–6, [5–10] in the final.

== Seeds ==
1. (France) Nicolas Mahut / (France) Édouard Roger-Vasselin (final)
2. (United Kingdom) Jamie Delgado / (United Kingdom) Jonathan Marray (Quarterfinal)
3. (Germany) Martin Emmrich / (Poland) Mateusz Kowalczyk (Quarterfinal)
4. (Russia) Michail Elgin / (Russia) Alexandre Kudryavtsev (first round)

== Draw ==
=== Key ===
- Q = Qualifier
- WC = Wild card
- LL = Lucky loser
- Alt = Alternate
- SE = Special exempt
- PR = Protected ranking
- ITF = ITF entry
- JE = Junior exempt
- w/o = Walkover
- r = Retired
- d = Defaulted
- SR = Special ranking

=== Draw ===
First round
1	(France) N Mahut (France) É Roger-Vasselin	6	6
(France) R Jouan (France) B Paire	3	3
WC	(France) J Eysseric (France) F Martin	7^{8}	4	[10]
(Spain) R Bautista-Agut (Slovakia) M Semjan	6^{6}	6	[7]
3	(Germany) M Emmrich (Poland) M Kowalczyk	6	3	[12]
(Slovakia) K Beck (France) M Gicquel	4	6	[10]
(France) O Charroin (Sweden) A Siljeström	6	6
(Germany) G Kretschmer (Germany) A Satschko	2	4
(Bulgaria) G Dimitrov (Russia) K Kravchuk	7^{7}	6
(Slovakia) P Červenák (Czech Republic) I Minář	6^{5}	4
(United Kingdom) C Eaton (Germany) F Moser	3	7	[10]
4	(Russia) M Elgin (Russia) A Kudryavtsev	6	5	[8]
WC	(France) P-H Herbert (France) N Renavand	6	6
WC	(France) Alexandre Renard (France) S Robert	2	2
(Switzerland) Y Allegro (Germany) A Beck	2	3
2	(United Kingdom) J Delgado (United Kingdom) J Marray	6	6

Quarterfinals
1	(France) N Mahut (France) É Roger-Vasselin	6	6
(France) J Eysseric (France) F Martin	4	4
3	(Germany) M Emmrich (Poland) M Kowalczyk	6^{5}	4
(France) O Charroin (Sweden) A Siljeström	7^{7}	6
(Bulgaria) G Dimitrov (Russia) K Kravchuk	7^{7}	6
(United Kingdom) C Eaton (Germany) F Moser	6^{5}	4
WC	(France) P-H Herbert (France) N Renavand	6	4	[10]
2	(United Kingdom) J Delgado (United Kingdom) J Marray	1	6	[4]

Semifinals
1	(France) N Mahut (France) É Roger-Vasselin	6^{4}	6	[10]
(France) O Charroin (Sweden) A Siljeström	7^{7}	4	[8]
(Bulgaria) G Dimitrov (Russia) K Kravchuk	6^{2}	6	[3]
WC	(France) P-H Herbert (France) N Renavand	7^{7}	3	[10]

Final
1	(France) N Mahut (France) É Roger-Vasselin	6	4	[5]
WC	(France) P-H Herbert (France) N Renavand	3	6	[10]
