= Valle d'Aosta Open =

ATP Challenger Tour
- Location: Courmayeur, Italy
- Category: ATP Challenger Tour
- Surface: Hard (indoor)
- Draw: 32S/32Q/16D
- Prize money: €30,000+H
- Website: Official website

The Valle d'Aosta Open was a tennis tournament held in Courmayeur, Italy in 2011.

== Past finals ==
=== Singles ===
Year	Champion	Runner-up	Score
2011	(France) Nicolas Mahut	(Luxembourg) Gilles Müller	7–6^{(7–4)}, 6–4

=== Doubles ===
Year	Champions	Runners-up	Score
2011	(France) Marc Gicquel (France) Nicolas Mahut	(France) Olivier Charroin (France) Alexandre Renard	6–3, 6–4

== See also ==
- ATP Saint-Vincent
- Courmayeur Ladies Open
