= 2011 Challenger DCNS de Cherbourg – Singles =

Singles
- 2011 Challenger DCNS de Cherbourg

Final
- Champion: (Bulgaria) Grigor Dimitrov
- Runner-up: (France) Nicolas Mahut
- Score: 6–2, 7–6^{(7–4)}

Events
| Singles | Doubles |
- Challenger La Manche

Nicolas Mahut was the defending champion and 2nd seed. He reached the final, but lost to 1st seed Grigor Dimitrov 2–6, 6–7^{(4–7)}.

== Seeds ==
1. (Bulgaria) Grigor Dimitrov (champion)
2. (France) Nicolas Mahut (final)
3. (France) Arnaud Clément (first round)
4. (France) Édouard Roger-Vasselin (second round)
5. (France) Benoît Paire (second round)
6. (Germany) Andreas Beck (first round)
7. (Russia) Alexandre Kudryavtsev (second round)
8. (Switzerland) Stéphane Bohli (quarterfinals)

== Draw ==
Key

- Q = Qualifier
- WC = Wild card
- LL = Lucky loser
- Alt = Alternate
- ITF = ITF entry
- PR = Protected ranking
- SR = Special ranking
- SE = Special exempt
- JE = Junior exempt
- JR = Junior Accelerator Programme entrant
- CO = College Accelerator Programme entrant
- NG = Next Gen Accelerator Program entrant
- w/o = Walkover
- r = Retired
- d = Defaulted

=== Finals ===
Semifinals
1 | (Bulgaria) Grigor Dimitrov | 6 | 6
(France) Stéphane Robert | 3 | 0
(Slovakia) Karol Beck | 6 | 4 | 3
2 | (France) Nicolas Mahut | 4 | 6 | 6

Final
1 | (Bulgaria) Grigor Dimitrov | 6 | 7^{7}
2 | (France) Nicolas Mahut | 2 | 6^{5}

=== Top half ===
First round
1 | (Bulgaria) G Dimitrov | 7^{7} | 7^{7}
(France) D Guez | 6^{3} | 6^{4}
(France) J Ouanna | 3 | 0
(Czech Republic) I Minář | 6 | 6
(France) V Millot | 2 | 0 | r
(France) M Gicquel | 6 | 3
(Belgium) Y Mertens | 1 | 7^{7} | 1
8 | (Switzerland) S Bohli | 6 | 6^{3} | 6
3 | (France) A Clément | 4 | 6^{6}
SE | (Germany) Stefan Seifert | 6 | 7^{8}
(France) S Robert | 6 | 6
Q | (Czech Republic) J Mertl | 3 | 0
(Russia) K Kravchuk | 1 | 3
(Australia) J Millman | 6 | 6
(France) G Burquier | 6 | 6^{2} | 3
7 | (Russia) A Kudryavtsev | 1 | 7^{7} | 6

Second round
1 | (Bulgaria) G Dimitrov | 7^{7} | 6
(Czech Republic) I Minář | 6^{5} | 2
(France) M Gicquel | 3 | 2
8 | (Switzerland) S Bohli | 6 | 6
SE | (Germany) S Seifert | 2 | 3
(France) S Robert | 6 | 6
(Australia) J Millman | 6 | 2 | 7^{7}
7 | (Russia) A Kudryavtsev | 4 | 6 | 6^{2}

Quarterfinals
1 | (Bulgaria) G Dimitrov | 6^{4} | 7^{7} | 6
8 | (Switzerland) S Bohli | 7^{7} | 6^{4} | 3
(France) S Robert | 6 | 6
(Australia) J Millman | 3 | 3

Semifinals
1 | (Bulgaria) G Dimitrov | 6 | 6
(France) S Robert | 3 | 0

=== Bottom half ===
First round
6 | (Germany) A Beck | 6 | 6^{3} | 3
(Slovakia) M Semjan | 1 | 7^{7} | 6
WC | (France) A Sidorenko | 6 | 6
(Slovakia) P Červenák | 1 | 4
(Slovakia) K Beck | 6 | 3 | 6
WC | (France) J Eysseric | 4 | 6 | 3
(Australia) B Klein | 3 | 4
4 | (France) É Roger-Vasselin | 6 | 6
5/WC | (France) B Paire | 6 | 3 | 7^{7}
(France) R Jouan | 4 | 6 | 6^{4}
Q | (Belgium) N Desein | 2 | 2
(Spain) R Bautista-Agut | 6 | 6
Q | (France) M Teixeira | 7^{7} | 6^{5} | 3
WC | (France) K de Schepper | 6^{4} | 7^{7} | 6
Q | (Netherlands) M Middelkoop | 6 | 3 | 2
2 | (France) N Mahut | 2 | 6 | 6

Second round
(Slovakia) M Semjan | 6 | 2 | 6
WC | (France) A Sidorenko | 2 | 6 | 2
(Slovakia) K Beck | 6 | 6
4 | (France) É Roger-Vasselin | 4 | 4
5/WC | (France) B Paire | 3 | 4
(Spain) R Bautista-Agut | 6 | 6
WC | (France) K de Schepper | 3 | 6 | 6^{2}
2 | (France) N Mahut | 6 | 4 | 7^{7}

Quarterfinals
(Slovakia) M Semjan | 2 | 1
(Slovakia) K Beck | 6 | 6
(Spain) R Bautista-Agut | 4 | 4
2 | (France) N Mahut | 6 | 6

Semifinals
(Slovakia) K Beck | 6 | 4 | 3
2 | (France) N Mahut | 4 | 6 | 6
