= Thierry Ascione =

French tennis player (born 1981)

- Country (sports): France
- Residence: Rueil-Malmaison, France
- Born: 17 January 1981 (age 44); Villeurbanne, France
- Height: 1.87 m (6 ft 1 1/2 in)
- Turned pro: 2000
- Retired: 2010
- Plays: Right-handed (one-handed backhand)
- Coach: Jérôme Potier
- Prize money: $1,031,961

Singles
- Career record: 22–54 (at ATP Tour level, Grand Slam level, and in Davis Cup)
- Career titles: 0
- Highest ranking: No. 81 (9 February 2004)

Grand Slam singles results
- Australian Open: 2R (2004)
- French Open: 2R (2007)
- Wimbledon: 1R (2004, 2008)
- US Open: 1R (2004, 2007)

Doubles
- Career record: 12–25 (at ATP Tour level, Grand Slam level, and in Davis Cup)
- Career titles: 0
- Highest ranking: No. 140 (3 May 2004)

Grand Slam doubles results
- Australian Open: 1R (2006)
- French Open: 3R (2010)

Grand Slam mixed doubles results
- French Open: 2R (2010)
- Last updated on: 13 September 2021.

Thierry Ascione (French: [tjɛʁi asjɔn]; born 17 January 1981) is an ATP tennis coach and a former professional player from France. He reached a career-high singles ranking of World No. 81 in February 2004.

== Career ==
Ascione turned pro in 2000. He played Roger Federer in the second round of Roland Garros 2007, saving five match points in the third set and holding two set points before eventually losing in straight sets.

He retired in September 2010 and was the tournament director of the defunct ATP Lyon Open, and later following its cancellation, currently director of the All In Open Challenger.

=== Coaching ===
Since his retirement he coached the former World No. 3 WTA player, Elina Svitolina. He was also coach to former World No. 5 ATP player Jo-Wilfried Tsonga and former World No.7 Richard Gasquet.

Since 2021 he coached Ugo Humbert (until 2022) and also Lucas Pouille (until 2024)

== Trivia ==
- Began playing tennis at age eight with his older brother, Frédéric.
- His uncle was European boxing champion and another uncle was World military boxing champion.
- Was Marat Safin's last ATP match win after holding 3 match points at the 2009 BNP Paribas Masters in Paris, Bercy.
- He is the godfather of Julien Boutter's son, Oscar.

== Performance timelines ==
Key
W	F	SF	QF	#R	RR	Q#	DNQ	A	NH

(W) winner; (F) finalist; (SF) semifinalist; (QF) quarterfinalist; (#R) rounds 4, 3, 2, 1; (RR) round-robin stage; (Q#) qualification round; (DNQ) did not qualify; (A) absent; (NH) not held; (SR) strike rate (events won / competed); (W–L) win–loss record.

=== Singles ===
Tournament	2001	2002	2003	2004	2005	2006	2007	2008	2009	2010	SR	W–L	Win%
Grand Slam tournaments
Australian Open	A	A	A	2R	Q1	1R	Q1	1R	Q2	Q2	0 / 3	1–3	25%
French Open	Q2	Q2	1R	1R	1R	1R	2R	1R	Q3	Q2	0 / 6	1–6	14%
Wimbledon	A	A	Q1	1R	Q1	A	Q2	1R	A	Q1	0 / 2	0–2	0%
US Open	A	A	Q1	1R	Q1	A	1R	Q3	A	A	0 / 2	0–2	0%
Win–loss	0–0	0–0	0–1	1–4	0–1	0–2	1–2	0–3	0–0	0–0	0 / 13	2–13	13%
ATP Tour Masters 1000
Indian Wells	A	A	A	1R	Q1	Q1	A	A	A	A	0 / 1	0–1	0%
Miami	A	A	A	3R	Q1	A	A	A	A	A	0 / 1	2–1	67%
Monte Carlo	A	A	A	1R	2R	Q1	A	Q1	A	A	0 / 2	1–2	33%
Hamburg	A	A	A	1R	Q2	Q1	A	A	NMS		0 / 1	0–1	0%
Canada Masters	A	A	A	Q1	A	A	A	A	A	A	0 / 0	0–0	–
Cincinnati	A	A	A	Q2	A	A	A	A	A	A	0 / 0	0–-0	–
Paris Masters	A	A	2R	Q2	A	Q1	A	A	1R	A	0 / 2	1–2	33%
Win–loss	0–0	0–0	1–1	2–4	1–1	0–0	0–0	0–0	0–1	0–0	0 / 7	4–7	36%

=== Doubles ===
Tournament	2002	2003	2004	2005	2006	2007	2008	2009	2010	SR	W–L	Win%
Grand Slam tournaments
Australian Open	A	A	A	A	1R	A	A	A	A	0 / 1	0–1	0%
French Open	1R	2R	1R	1R	1R	1R	1R	A	3R	0 / 8	3–8	27%
Wimbledon	A	A	A	A	A	A	A	A	A	0 / 0	0–0	–
US Open	A	A	A	A	A	A	A	A	A	0 / 0	0–0	–
Win–loss	0–1	1–1	0–1	0–1	0–2	0–1	0–1	0–0	2–1	0 / 9	3–9	25%

== ATP Challenger and ITF Futures finals ==
=== Singles: 18 (11–7) ===
Legend ATP Challenger (8–5) ITF Futures (3–2)	Finals by surface Hard (8–1) Clay (3–4) Grass (0–9) Carpet (0–2)

Result	W–L	Date	Tournament	Tier	Surface	Opponent	Score
Loss	0–1	Jul 2001	France F13, Aix-Les-Bains	Futures	Clay	(France) Florent Serra	2–6, 3–6
Win	1–1	Aug 2001	France F14, Valescure	Futures	Hard	(France) Julien Couly	6–4, 2–6, 6–2
Win	2–1	Dec 2002	Spain F22, Orense	Futures	Hard	(Croatia) Roko Karanusic	walkover
Win	3–1	Feb 2003	Andrézieux, France	Challenger	Hard	(Slovakia) Karol Beck	6–4, 6–2
Loss	3–2	Mar 2003	France F8, Melun	Futures	Carpet	(Netherlands) Peter Wessels	walkover
Win	4–2	Jul 2003	Helsinki, Finland	Challenger	Clay	(Russia) Igor Andreev	2–6, 6–1, 6–3
Win	5–2	Feb 2005	Andrézieux, France	Challenger	Hard	(Switzerland) Stan Wawrinka	6–1, 6–3
Win	6–2	Jun 2005	Reggio Emilia, Italy	Challenger	Clay	(Argentina) Martin Vassallo Arguello	6–3, 6–0
Win	7–2	Aug 2005	Bronx, United States	Challenger	Hard	(United States) Brian Vahaly	6–2, 6–3
Win	8–2	Feb 2007	France F3, Bressuire	Futures	Hard	(Spain) Daniel Munoz De La Nava	6–2, 7–6^{(7–5)}
Win	9–2	May 2007	Rome, Italy	Challenger	Clay	(Romania) Victor Crivoi	6–3, 6–3
Loss	9–3	Jul 2007	Montauban, France	Challenger	Clay	(Switzerland) Michael Lammer	6–1, 3–6, 6–7^{(4–7)}
Loss	9–4	Jul 2007	Mantova, Italy	Challenger	Clay	(Italy) Alessio Di Mauro	5–7, 6–7^{(6–8)}
Win	10–4	Oct 2007	Andrézieux, France	Challenger	Hard	(Argentina) Jose Acasuso	7–6^{(8–6)}, 2–6, 6–2
Win	11–4	Mar 2008	Cherbourg, France	Challenger	Hard	(Denmark) Kristian Pless	7–5, 7–6^{(7–5)}
Loss	11–5	Mar 2009	Cherbourg, France	Challenger	Hard	(France) Arnaud Clément	2–6, 4–6
Loss	11–6	Aug 2009	Vigo, Spain	Challenger	Clay	(Netherlands) Thiemo de Bakker	4–6, 6–4, 2–6
Loss	11–7	Oct 2009	Rennes, France	Challenger	Carpet	(Colombia) Alejandro Falla	3–6, 2–6

=== Doubles: 9 (4–5) ===
Legend ATP Challenger (2–1) ITF Futures (2–4)	Finals by surface Hard (1–2) Clay (3–3) Grass (0–0) Carpet (0–0)

Result	W–L	Date	Tournament	Tier	Surface	Partner	Opponents	Score
Loss	0–1	Jul 1999	France F8, Aix les Bains	Futures	Clay	(France) Marc-Olivier Baron	(France) Julien Cassaigne (France) Nicolas Mahut	3–6, 6–7
Win	1–1	Jan 2002	France F2, Angers	Futures	Clay	(France) Stephane Huet	(Spain) Oscar Hernandez Perez (Spain) German Puentes-Alcaniz	4–6, 7–6^{(7–2)}, 6–2
Win	2–1	Apr 2002	Greece F1, Syros	Futures	Hard	(France) Florent Serra	(Slovakia) Karol Beck (Slovakia) Michal Mertinak	3–6, 6–4, 6–2
Loss	2–2	Oct 2002	France F20, Saint Dizier	Futures	Hard	(France) Stephane Huet	(Czech Republic) Jan Mertl (Czech Republic) Pavel Riha	4–6, 4–6
Loss	2–3	Dec 2002	Spain F21, Ponte Vedra	Futures	Clay	(France) Thomas Oger	(Spain) Carlos Martinez-Comet (Spain) German Puentes-Alcaniz	2–6, 6–4, 4–6
Loss	2–4	Jan 2003	France F1, Grasse	Futures	Clay	(France) Jerome Haehnel	(France) Nicolas Mahut (France) Edouard Roger-Vasselin	3–6, 6–1, 2–6
Win	3–4	May 2004	Aix-en-Provence, France	Challenger	Clay	(France) Jean-Francois Bachelot	(Argentina) Federico Browne (Netherlands) Rogier Wassen	6–4, 5–7, 6–4
Win	4–4	Jul 2006	Tampere, Finland	Challenger	Clay	(France) Edouard Roger-Vasselin	(Finland) Lauri Kiiski (Finland) Tero Vilen	5–7, 6–2, [12–10]
Loss	4–5	Jan 2007	Nouméa, New Caledonia	Challenger	Hard	(France) Edouard Roger-Vasselin	(United States) Alex Kuznetsov (United States) Phillip Simmonds	6–7^{(5–7)}, 3–6
