= Challenger La Manche =

Tennis tournament in France

- 2025 Challenger La Manche

ATP Challenger Tour
- Event name: Challenger Cherbourg La Manche
- Location: Cherbourg, France
- Venue: Complexe Sportif; Chantereyne
- Category: ATP Challenger 80
- Surface: Hard (indoor)
- Draw: 32S/24Q/16D
- Prize money: € 45,730
- Website: Website

The Challenger Cherbourg La Manche is a professional tennis tournament played on indoor hard courts. It is currently part of the Association of Tennis Professionals (ATP) Challenger Tour. It has been held annually at the Complexe Sportif Chantereyne in Cherbourg, France, since 1994 and it is the oldest Challenger in the world in terms of consecutive editions.

== Past finals ==
=== Singles ===
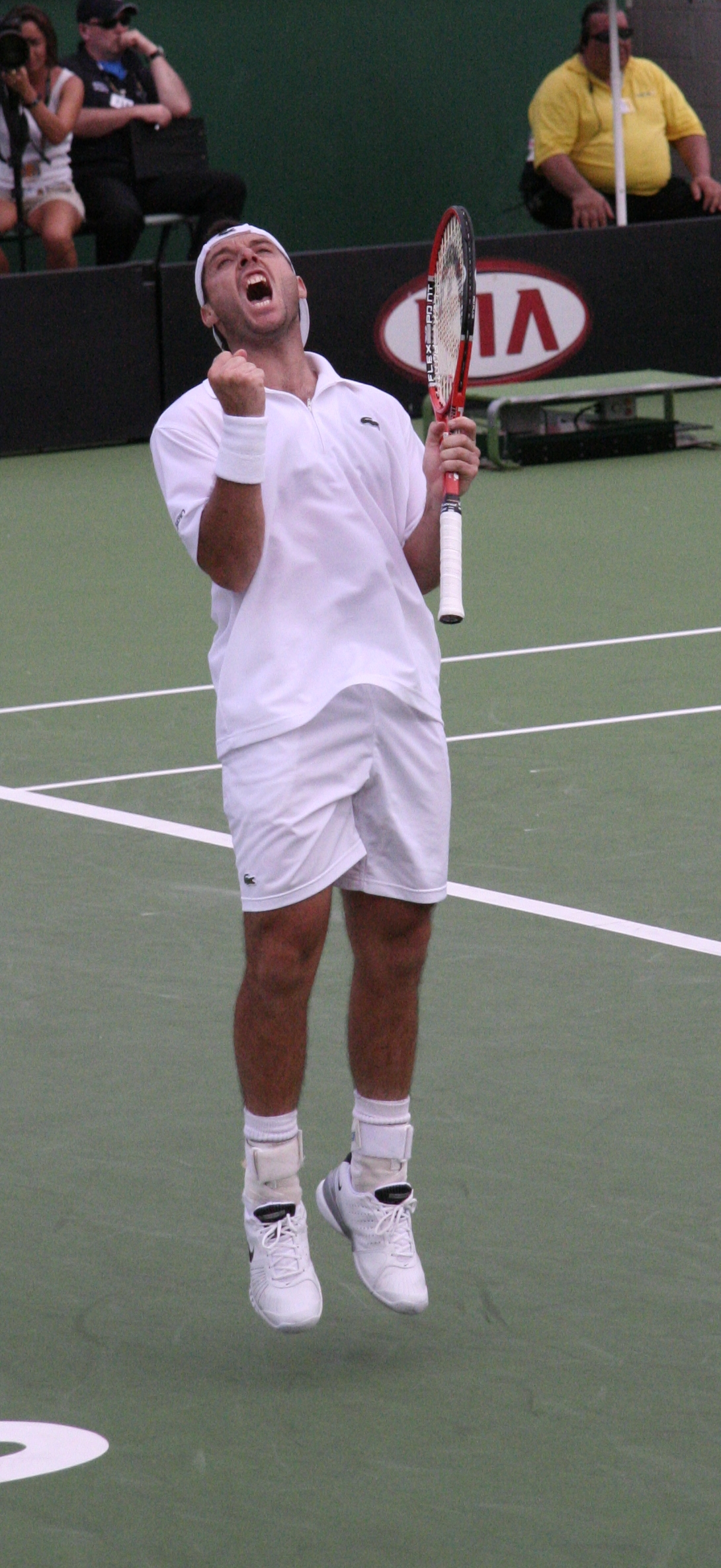
Sébastien Grosjean is one of eight Frenchmen to have won the singles title in the event's sixteen editions since 1994

Year	Champion	Runner-up	Score
2026	Pavel Kotov	(Italy) Filippo Romano	6–2, 7–5
2025	(France) Pierre-Hugues Herbert	(Netherlands) Jelle Sels	6–3, 6–4
2024	(Hungary) Zsombor Piros	(France) Matteo Martineau	6–3, 6–4
2023	(Italy) Giulio Zeppieri	(France) Titouan Droguet	7–5, 7–6^{(7–4)}
2022	(France) Benjamin Bonzi	(France) Constant Lestienne	6–4, 2–6, 6–4
2021	(Belgium) Ruben Bemelmans	(Czech Republic) Lukáš Rosol	6–4, 6–4
2020	(Russia) Roman Safiullin	(Italy) Roberto Marcora	6–4, 6–2
2019	(France) Ugo Humbert	(Belgium) Steve Darcis	6–7^{(6–8)}, 6–3, 6–3
2018	(Germany) Maximilian Marterer	(France) Constant Lestienne	6–4, 7–5
2017	(France) Mathias Bourgue	(Germany) Maximilian Marterer	6–3, 7–6^{(7–3)}
2016	(Australia) Jordan Thompson	(Czech Republic) Adam Pavlásek	4–6, 6–4, 6–1
2015	(Slovakia) Norbert Gombos	(France) Benoît Paire	6–1, 7–6^{(7–4)}
2014	(France) Kenny de Schepper	(Slovakia) Norbert Gombos	3–6, 6–2, 6–3
2013	(Netherlands) Jesse Huta Galung	(France) Vincent Millot	6–1, 6–3
2012	(France) Josselin Ouanna	(France) Maxime Teixeira	6–3, 6–2
2011	(Bulgaria) Grigor Dimitrov	(France) Nicolas Mahut	6–2, 7–6^{(7–4)}
2010	(France) Nicolas Mahut (2)	(Luxembourg) Gilles Müller	6–4, 6–3
2009	(France) Arnaud Clément	(France) Thierry Ascione	6–2, 6–4
2008	(France) Thierry Ascione	(Denmark) Kristian Pless	7–5, 7–6^{(7–5)}
2007	(Italy) Federico Luzzi	(France) Jérôme Haehnel	7–5, 7–6^{(8–6)}
2006	(France) Nicolas Mahut	(France) Jean-Christophe Faurel	6–2, 6–4
2005	(South Africa) Rik de Voest	(France) Nicolas Mahut	7–5, 6–2
2004	(France) Julien Jeanpierre	(Croatia) Roko Karanušić	6–1, 6–2
2003	(Argentina) Sergio Roitman	(Spain) Rafael Nadal	6–3, 5–7, 6–4
2002	(France) Lionel Roux	(France) Jean-René Lisnard	6–4, 5–7, 6–3
2001	(Bulgaria) Orlin Stanoytchev	(Austria) Clemens Trimmel	6–4, 3–6, 7–5
2000	(France) Julien Boutter	(Russia) Mikhail Youzhny	6–1, 6–0
1999	(France) Sébastien Grosjean	(France) Antony Dupuis	4–6, 6–3, 6–0
1998	(France) Jérôme Golmard	(Italy) Gianluca Pozzi	3–6, 6–4, 6–3
1997	(Denmark) Frederik Fetterlein	(France) Lionel Roux	6–3, 6–4
1996	(Sweden) Magnus Gustafsson	(Denmark) Kenneth Carlsen	6–7, 7–6, 6–4
1995	(Italy) Gianluca Pozzi	(Denmark) Kenneth Carlsen	1–6, 7–6, 6–4
1994	(France) Thierry Guardiola	(France) Lionel Roux	6–4, 6–4

=== Doubles ===
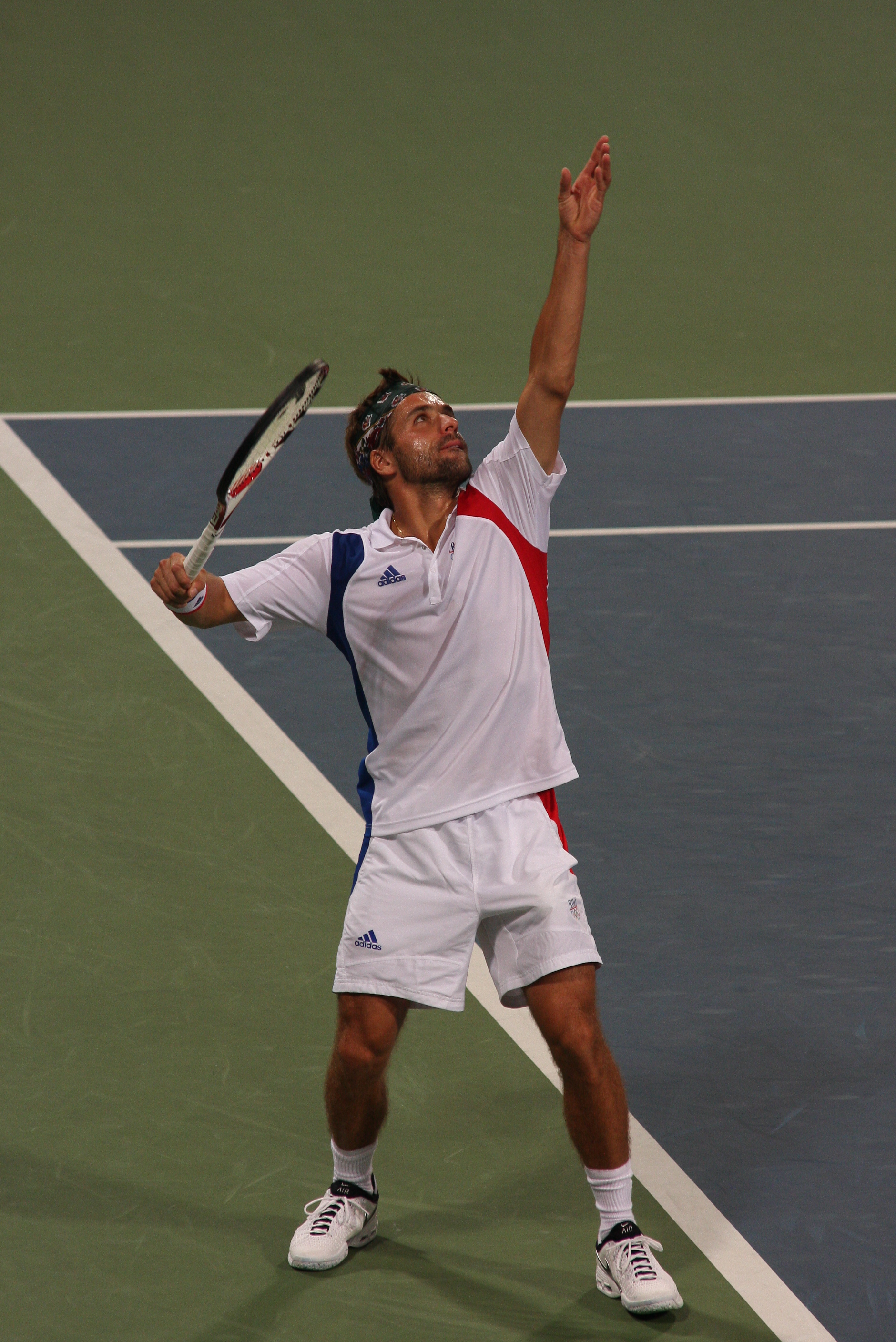
Arnaud Clément won the singles against Ascione and the doubles alongside Roger-Vasselin in 2009, to become the third player to win both events after Boutter and de Voest

Year	Champions	Runners-up	Score
2026	(Canada) Cleeve Harper (United Kingdom) David Stevenson	(Poland) Karol Drzewiecki (Poland) Szymon Walków	4–6, 6–3, [10–8]
2025	(Ukraine) Oleg Prihodko (Ukraine) Vitaliy Sachko	(Slovakia) Lukáš Pokorný (Italy) Giorgio Ricca	6–2, 6–2
2024	(United States) George Goldhoff (Japan) James Trotter	(Netherlands) Ryan Nijboer (Germany) Niklas Schell	6–2, 6–3
2023	Ivan Liutarevich (Ukraine) Vladyslav Manafov	(Poland) Karol Drzewiecki (Poland) Kacper Żuk	7–6^{(12–10)}, 7–6^{(9–7)}
2022	(France) Jonathan Eysseric (France) Quentin Halys	(Germany) Hendrik Jebens (Germany) Niklas Schell	7–6^{(8–6)}, 6–2
2021	(Slovakia) Lukáš Klein (Slovakia) Alex Molčan	(France) Antoine Hoang (France) Albano Olivetti	1–6, 7–5, [10–6]
2020	(Russia) Pavel Kotov (Russia) Roman Safiullin	(France) Dan Added (France) Albano Olivetti	7–6^{(8–6)}, 5–7, [12–10]
2019	(United States) Robert Galloway (United States) Nathaniel Lammons	(Spain) Javier Barranco Cosano (Italy) Raúl Brancaccio	4–6, 7–6^{(7–4)}, [10–8]
2018	(Monaco) Romain Arneodo (Austria) Tristan-Samuel Weissborn	(Croatia) Antonio Šančić (United Kingdom) Ken Skupski	6–3, 1–6, [10–4]
2017	(Czech Republic) Roman Jebavý (Slovakia) Igor Zelenay	(Croatia) Dino Marcan (Austria) Tristan-Samuel Weissborn	7–6^{(7–4)}, 6–7^{(4–7)}, [10–6]
2016	(United Kingdom) Ken Skupski (United Kingdom) Neal Skupski	(Japan) Yoshihito Nishioka (Bosnia and Herzegovina) Aldin Šetkić	4–6, 6–3, [10–6]
2015	(Germany) Andreas Beck (Czech Republic) Jan Mertl	(Australia) Rameez Junaid (Canada) Adil Shamasdin	6–2, 3–6, [10–3]
2014	(Finland) Henri Kontinen (Russia) Konstantin Kravchuk	(France) Pierre-Hugues Herbert (France) Albano Olivetti	6–4, 6–7^{(3–7)}, [10–7]
2013	(Thailand) Sanchai Ratiwatana (2) (Thailand) Sonchat Ratiwatana (2)	(Germany) Philipp Marx (Romania) Florin Mergea	7–5, 6–4
2012	(Lithuania) Laurynas Grigelis (Belarus) Uladzimir Ignatik	(Germany) Dustin Brown (United Kingdom) Jonathan Marray	4–6, 7–6^{(11–9)}, [10–0]
2011	(France) Pierre-Hugues Herbert (France) Nicolas Renavand	(France) Nicolas Mahut (France) Édouard Roger-Vasselin	3–6, 6–4, [10–5]
2010	(France) Nicolas Mahut (France) Édouard Roger-Vasselin (2)	(India) Harsh Mankad (Canada) Adil Shamasdin	6–2, 6–4
2009	(France) Arnaud Clément (France) Édouard Roger-Vasselin	(Austria) Martin Fischer (Austria) Martin Slanar	4–6, 6–2, [10–3]
2008	(Romania) Florin Mergea (Romania) Horia Tecău	(Switzerland) Jean-Claude Scherrer (Brazil) Márcio Torres	7–5, 7–5
2007	(Slovakia) Michal Mertiňák (2) (Czech Republic) Robin Vik	(Poland) Łukasz Kubot (Belgium) Dick Norman	6–2, 6–4
2006	(France) Jean-François Bachelot (France) Stéphane Robert	(Thailand) Sanchai Ratiwatana (Thailand) Sonchat Ratiwatana	7–6^{(7–5)}, 6–3
2005	(Thailand) Sanchai Ratiwatana (Thailand) Sonchat Ratiwatana	(France) Jean-Christophe Faurel (France) Nicolas Renavand	6–3, 6–2
2004	(Slovakia) Michal Mertiňák (Germany) Alexander Waske	(Spain) Emilio Benfele Álvarez (Japan) Jun Kato	6–4, 7–6^{(7–1)}
2003	(France) Benjamin Cassaigne (South Africa) Rik de Voest	(United States) Brandon Coupe (United States) Scott Humphries	6–7^{(17–19)}, 7–6^{(7–5)}, 7–6^{(13–11)}
2002	(Israel) Noam Behr (Israel) Jonathan Erlich	(France) Julien Benneteau (France) Lionel Roux	walkover
2001	(Austria) Julian Knowle (Switzerland) Lorenzo Manta	(France) Cedric Kauffmann (Canada) Frédéric Niemeyer	3–6, 6–4, 6–3
2000	(France) Julien Boutter (France) Michaël Llodra	(France) Julien Benneteau (France) Nicolas Mahut	2–6, 6–4, 7–5
1999	(Australia) Michael Hill (Australia) Andrew Painter	(Italy) Massimo Bertolini (Italy) Cristian Brandi	7–5, 7–6
1998	(Italy) Massimo Ardinghi (Italy) Massimo Bertolini	(France) Jean-Philippe Fleurian (France) Stéphane Simian	6–3, 2–6, 6–4
1997	(Belarus) Max Mirnyi (South Africa) Kevin Ullyett	(Italy) Stefano Pescosolido (Italy) Vincenzo Santopadre	6–3, 6–7, 6–4
1996	(South Africa) Marius Barnard (United States) Bill Behrens (2)	(Portugal) João Cunha Silva (Germany) Mathias Huning	6–2, 4–6, 6–3
1995	(United States) Bill Behrens (United States) Matt Lucena	(South Africa) Marius Barnard (South Africa) Stefan Kruger	7–6, 6–1
1994	(United Kingdom) Neil Broad (South Africa) Johan de Beer	(United States) Donald Johnson (United States) Kent Kinnear	7–6, 2–6, 6–3
