= 2024 Chicago Men's Challenger – Singles =

Singles
- 2024 Chicago Men's Challenger

Final
- Champion: (Canada) Gabriel Diallo
- Runner-up: (China) Bu Yunchaokete
- Score: 6–3, 7–6^{(7–3)}

Events
Singles	Doubles
← 2023 ·	Chicago Men's Challenger	· 2025 →

Alex Michelsen was the defending champion but chose not to defend his title.

Gabriel Diallo won the title after defeating Bu Yunchaokete 6–3, 7–6^{(7–3)} in the final.

== Seeds ==
1. (France) Térence Atmane (second round)
2. (France) Benjamin Bonzi (first round)
3. (France) Hugo Grenier (quarterfinals)
4. (Canada) Gabriel Diallo (champion)
5. (Canada) Alexis Galarneau (first round)
6. (China) Bu Yunchaokete (final)
7. (Hong Kong) Coleman Wong (first round)
8. (South Korea) Hong Seong-chan (quarterfinals)

== Draw ==
=== Key ===
- Q = Qualifier
- WC = Wild card
- LL = Lucky loser
- Alt = Alternate
- ITF = ITF entry
- PR = Protected ranking
- SR = Special ranking
- SE = Special exempt
- JE = Junior exempt
- JR = Junior Accelerator Programme entrant
- CO = College Accelerator Programme entrant
- NG = Next Gen Accelerator Program entrant
- w/o = Walkover
- r = Retired
- d = Defaulted

=== Finals ===
Semifinals
Q	(United Kingdom) Jacob Fearnley	2	3
4	(Canada) Gabriel Diallo	6	6
6	(China) Bu Yunchaokete	6	7
WC	(United States) Learner Tien	4	5

Final
4	(Canada) Gabriel Diallo	6	7^{7}
6	(China) Bu Yunchaokete	3	6^{3}

=== Top half ===
First round
1/SE	(France) T Atmane	7^{7}	7^{7}
(United States) Micah Braswell	6^{4}	6^{5}
Q	(United Kingdom) J Fearnley	6	6
(Australia) L Tu	4	3
Alt	(United States) B Holt	6	7^{7}
WC	(United States) A Fenty	1	6^{4}
(Australia) M Polmans	2	7^{7}	6
5	(Canada) A Galarneau	6	6^{5}	4
4	(Canada) G Diallo	6	6
Q	(Japan) J Trotter	4	2
(Brazil) J Fonseca	6	6
(Japan) Y Shimizu	3	4
(United States) M Krueger	6	6
(France) A Géa	4	4
(Australia) P Sekulic	6	6
7	(Hong Kong) C Wong	2	1

Second round
1/SE	(France) T Atmane	2	6	6^{3}
Q	(United Kingdom) J Fearnley	6	1	7^{7}
Alt	(United States) B Holt	6	7^{7}
(Australia) M Polmans	4	6^{4}
4	(Canada) G Diallo	7^{7}	6
(Brazil) J Fonseca	6^{1}	1
(United States) M Krueger	6	6
(Australia) P Sekulic	4	2

Quarterfinals
Q	(United Kingdom) J Fearnley	6	6
Alt	(United States) B Holt	3	2
4	(Canada) G Diallo	6	6
(United States) M Krueger	3	2

Semifinals
Q	(United Kingdom) J Fearnley	2	3
4	(Canada) G Diallo	6	6

=== Bottom half ===
First round
6	(China) Y Bu	6	6
Q	(United States) M Zheng	4	4
Q	(Chinese Taipei) T-l Wu	4	6	1
(United Kingdom) P Jubb	6	2	6
WC	(United States) N Basavareddy	2	7^{8}	7
Q	(Estonia) M Lajal	6	6^{6}	5
(Australia) B Tomic	2	4
3	(France) H Grenier	6	6
8	(South Korea) S-c Hong	6	6
(Australia) A Bolt	4	3
(Japan) S Shimabukuro	7^{7}	2	6^{5}
(United Kingdom) C Broom	6^{4}	6	7^{7}
(Argentina) JP Ficovich	4	6	5
Q	(United States) A Mayo	6	3	7
WC	(United States) L Tien	6	6
2	(France) B Bonzi	4	4

Second round
6	(China) Y Bu	6	6
(United Kingdom) P Jubb	3	3
WC	(United States) N Basavareddy	4	0
3	(France) H Grenier	6	6
8	(South Korea) S-c Hong	6	6^{4}	6
(United Kingdom) C Broom	3	7^{7}	4
Q	(United States) A Mayo	3	7^{7}	3
WC	(United States) L Tien	6	6^{4}	6

Quarterfinals
6	(China) Y Bu	6	6^{9}	6
3	(France) H Grenier	2	7^{11}	1
8	(South Korea) S-c Hong	3	1
WC	(United States) L Tien	6	6

Semifinals
6	(China) Y Bu	6	7
WC	(United States) L Tien	4	5
