= 2024 Chicago Men's Challenger =

- Date: 22–28 July
- Edition: 3rd
- Surface: Hard
- Location: Chicago, United States

Champions

Singles
- (Canada) Gabriel Diallo

Doubles
- (Australia) Luke Saville / (Australia) Li Tu
← 2023 ·	Chicago Men's Challenger	· 2025 →

The 2024 Chicago Men's Challenger was a professional tennis tournament played on hard courts. It was the third edition of the tournament which was part of the 2024 ATP Challenger Tour. It took place in Chicago, United States between July 22 and July 28, 2024.

== Singles main draw entrants ==
=== Seeds ===
Country	Player	Rank^{1}	Seed
FRA	Térence Atmane	120	1
FRA	Benjamin Bonzi	136	2
FRA	Hugo Grenier	164	3
CAN	Gabriel Diallo	165	4
CAN	Alexis Galarneau	167	5
CHN	Bu Yunchaokete	174	6
HKG	Coleman Wong	179	7
KOR	Hong Seong-chan	181	8

- ^{1} Rankings as of 15 July 2024.

=== Other entrants ===
The following players received wildcards into the singles main draw:

- (United States) Nishesh Basavareddy
- (United States) Andrew Fenty
- (United States) Learner Tien

The following player received entry into the singles main draw as a special exempt:

- (France) Térence Atmane

The following player received entry into the singles main draw as an alternate:

- (United States) Brandon Holt

The following players received entry from the qualifying draw:

- (United Kingdom) Jacob Fearnley
- (Estonia) Mark Lajal
- (United States) Aidan Mayo
- (Japan) James Trotter
- (Chinese Taipei) Wu Tung-lin
- (United States) Michael Zheng

== Champions ==
=== Singles ===
- (Canada) Gabriel Diallo def. (China) Bu Yunchaokete 6–3, 7–6^{(7–3)}.

=== Doubles ===
- (Australia) Luke Saville / (Australia) Li Tu def. (United States) Mac Kiger / (Canada) Benjamin Sigouin 6–4, 3–6, [10–3].
