= 2023 Chicago Men's Challenger – Singles =

Singles
- 2023 Chicago Men's Challenger

Final
- Champion: (United States) Alex Michelsen
- Runner-up: (Japan) Yuta Shimizu
- Score: 7–5, 6–2

Events
Singles	Doubles
← 2022 ·	Chicago Men's Challenger	· 2024 →

Roman Safiullin was the defending champion but chose not to defend his title.

Alex Michelsen won the title after defeating Yuta Shimizu 7–5, 6–2 in the final.

== Seeds ==
1. (Australia) James Duckworth (withdrew)
2. (United States) Aleksandar Kovacevic (second round)
3. (Ecuador) Emilio Gómez (first round)
4. (China) Shang Juncheng (semifinals)
5. (Turkey) Altuğ Çelikbilek (first round)
6. (Canada) Alexis Galarneau (first round)
7. (France) Giovanni Mpetshi Perricard (semifinals)
8. (United States) Steve Johnson (first round)

== Draw ==
=== Key ===
- Q = Qualifier
- WC = Wild card
- LL = Lucky loser
- Alt = Alternate
- SE = Special exempt
- PR = Protected ranking
- ITF = ITF entry
- JE = Junior exempt
- w/o = Walkover
- r = Retired
- d = Defaulted
- SR = Special ranking

=== Finals ===
Semifinals
(Japan) Yuta Shimizu	7^{7}	7^{7}
7	(France) Giovanni Mpetshi Perricard	6^{5}	6^{5}
4	(China) Shang Juncheng	6	5	3
(United States) Alex Michelsen	4	7	6

Final
(Japan) Yuta Shimizu	5	2
(United States) Alex Michelsen	7	6

=== Top half ===
First round
LL	(United States) E Zhu	2	4
(Japan) Y Shimizu	6	6
Q	(South Korea) Y-s Chung	6	6
(Jordan) A Shelbayh	3	4
Alt	(Chinese Taipei) J Jung	7	6
Q	(Australia) B Tomic	5	3
(United States) N Basavareddy	6	2	6
8	(United States) S Johnson	3	6	4
3	(Ecuador) E Gómez	2	1
Alt	(Japan) Y Uchiyama	6	6
(Estonia) M Lajal	6	6
Q	(Australia) O Jasika	1	4
WC	(United States) E Spizzirri	2	2
(Australia) A Walton	6	6
(United States) T Sandgren	4	4
7	(France) G Mpetshi Perricard	6	6

Second round
(Japan) Y Shimizu	6	5	6
Q	(South Korea) Y-s Chung	3	7	3
Alt	(Chinese Taipei) J Jung	3	7^{7}	6
(United States) N Basavareddy	6	6^{5}	2
Alt	(Japan) Y Uchiyama	6	2	2
(Estonia) M Lajal	4	6	6
(Australia) A Walton	6^{3}	4
7	(France) G Mpetshi Perricard	7^{7}	6

Quarterfinals
(Japan) Y Shimizu	6	7
Alt	(Chinese Taipei) J Jung	2	5
(Estonia) M Lajal	6^{3}	6	6^{6}
7	(France) G Mpetshi Perricard	7^{7}	4	7^{8}

Semifinals
(Japan) Y Shimizu	7^{7}	7^{7}
7	(France) G Mpetshi Perricard	6^{5}	6^{5}

=== Bottom half ===
First round
5	(Turkey) A Çelikbilek	4	6^{2}
Q	(Australia) T Schoolkate	6	7^{7}
Q	(Mexico) E Escobedo	6^{6}	6	4
WC	(United States) E Quinn	7^{8}	0	6
(Australia) D Sweeny	4	4
Q	(Ukraine) I Marchenko	6	6
SE	(Kazakhstan) M Kukushkin	6^{5}	2^{r}
4	(China) J Shang	7^{7}	3
6	(Canada) A Galarneau	6^{3}	1
WC	(Japan) K Nishikori	7^{7}	6
Alt	(Tunisia) S Mansouri	3	6	6
Alt	(Australia) J McCabe	6	4	4
(Australia) L Tu	6^{3}	7^{7}	6^{5}
(United States) A Michelsen	7^{7}	6^{5}	7^{7}
(Kazakhstan) B Zhukayev	3	4
2	(United States) A Kovacevic	6	6

Second round
Q	(Australia) T Schoolkate	6	3	2
WC	(United States) E Quinn	4	6	6
Q	(Ukraine) I Marchenko	5	3
4	(China) J Shang	7	6
WC	(Japan) K Nishikori	7^{7}	6
Alt	(Tunisia) S Mansouri	6^{1}	4
(United States) A Michelsen	6	6
2	(United States) A Kovacevic	4	2

Quarterfinals
WC	(United States) E Quinn	5	1
4	(China) J Shang	7	6
WC	(Japan) K Nishikori	6^{13}	6	1
(United States) A Michelsen	7^{15}	3	6

Semifinals
4	(China) J Shang	6	5	3
(United States) A Michelsen	4	7	6
