= 2023 Chicago Men's Challenger – Doubles =

Doubles
- 2023 Chicago Men's Challenger

Final
- Champions: (Latvia) Miķelis Lībietis (Tunisia) Skander Mansouri
- Runners-up: (South Korea) Chung Yun-seong (Australia) Andrew Harris
- Score: 7–6^{(7–5)}, 6–3

Events
Singles	Doubles
← 2022 ·	Chicago Men's Challenger	· 2024 →

André Göransson and Ben McLachlan were the defending champions but chose not to defend their title.

Miķelis Lībietis and Skander Mansouri won the title after defeating Chung Yun-seong and Andrew Harris 7–6^{(7–5)}, 6–3 in the final.

== Seeds ==
1. (South Korea) Chung Yun-seong / (Australia) Andrew Harris (final)
2. (Philippines) Ruben Gonzales / (United States) Alex Lawson (first round)
3. (South Korea) Nam Ji-sung / (New Zealand) Artem Sitak (quarterfinals)
4. (India) Purav Raja / (India) Divij Sharan (first round)

== Draw ==
=== Key ===
- Q = Qualifier
- WC = Wild card
- LL = Lucky loser
- Alt = Alternate
- ITF = ITF entry
- PR = Protected ranking
- SR = Special ranking
- SE = Special exempt
- JE = Junior exempt
- JR = Junior Accelerator Programme entrant
- CO = College Accelerator Programme entrant
- NG = Next Gen Accelerator Program entrant
- w/o = Walkover
- r = Retired
- d = Defaulted

First round
1	(South Korea) Y-s Chung (Australia) A Harris	3	6	[11]
(Australia) T Schoolkate (Australia) A Walton	6	3	[9]
(United Kingdom) S Duncan (Canada) K Stevenson	2	5
(Japan) Y Shimizu (Canada) B Sigouin	6	7
3	(South Korea) J-s Nam (New Zealand) A Sitak	6	6
(Australia) C Puttergill (Northern Mariana Islands) C Sinclair	3	2
(Australia) J McCabe (Kazakhstan) B Zhukayev
PR	(United States) C Harrison (United States) T Sandgren	w/o
WC	(United States) A Fenty (United States) D Young	4	7	[11]
(Chinese Taipei) J Jung (United States) E King	6	5	[13]
(Latvia) M Lībietis (Tunisia) S Mansouri	6^{4}	6	[10]
4	(India) P Raja (India) D Sharan	7^{7}	2	[6]
WC	(United States) R Harrison (United States) A Michelsen	6	6
(Estonia) M Lajal (Jordan) A Shelbayh	4	4
(Australia) A Bolt (Japan) Y Uchiyama	1	7	[10]
2	(Philippines) R Gonzales (United States) A Lawson	6	5	[4]

Quarterfinals
1	(South Korea) Y-s Chung (Australia) A Harris	2	6	[12]
(Japan) Y Shimizu (Canada) B Sigouin	6	3	[10]
3	(South Korea) J-s Nam (New Zealand) A Sitak	2	1
PR	(United States) C Harrison (United States) T Sandgren	6	6
(Chinese Taipei) J Jung (United States) E King	7^{7}	3	[7]
(Latvia) M Lībietis (Tunisia) S Mansouri	6^{3}	6	[10]
WC	(United States) R Harrison (United States) A Michelsen	7^{7}	7^{8}
(Australia) A Bolt (Japan) Y Uchiyama	6^{2}	6^{6}

Semifinals
1	(South Korea) Y-s Chung (Australia) A Harris	6	3	[10]
PR	(United States) C Harrison (United States) T Sandgren	4	6	[7]
(Latvia) M Lībietis (Tunisia) S Mansouri	7^{7}	6
WC	(United States) R Harrison (United States) A Michelsen	6^{4}	1

Final
1	(South Korea) Y-s Chung (Australia) A Harris	6^{5}	3
(Latvia) M Lībietis (Tunisia) S Mansouri	7^{7}	6
