= 2024 Chicago Men's Challenger – Doubles =

Doubles
- 2024 Chicago Men's Challenger

Final
- Champions: (Australia) Luke Saville (Australia) Li Tu
- Runners-up: (United States) Mac Kiger (Canada) Benjamin Sigouin
- Score: 6–4, 3–6, [10–3]

Events
Singles	Doubles
← 2023 ·	Chicago Men's Challenger	· 2025 →

Miķelis Lībietis and Skander Mansouri were the defending champions but chose not to defend their title.

Luke Saville and Li Tu won the title after defeating Mac Kiger and Benjamin Sigouin 6–4, 3–6, [10–3] in the final.

== Seeds ==
1. (New Zealand) Finn Reynolds / (Chile) Matías Soto (first round)
2. (Australia) Patrick Harper / (Australia) Calum Puttergill (quarterfinals)
3. (United States) Mac Kiger / (Canada) Benjamin Sigouin (final)
4. (United States) Trey Hilderbrand / (United States) Alex Lawson (semifinals)

== Draw ==
Key

- Q = Qualifier
- WC = Wild card
- LL = Lucky loser
- Alt = Alternate
- ITF = ITF entry
- PR = Protected ranking
- SR = Special ranking
- SE = Special exempt
- JE = Junior exempt
- JR = Junior Accelerator Programme entrant
- CO = College Accelerator Programme entrant
- NG = Next Gen Accelerator Program entrant
- w/o = Walkover
- r = Retired
- d = Defaulted

=== Draw ===
First round
1	(New Zealand) F Reynolds (Chile) M Soto	3	6	[6]
(United Kingdom) C Broom (United Kingdom) J Fearnley	6	3	[10]
(France) T Atmane (France) A Géa
(Japan) R Noguchi (Australia) A Taylor	w/o
3	(United States) M Kiger (Canada) B Sigouin	6	6
(France) C Chidekh (France) L Sanchez	2	3
(Japan) J Trotter (Japan) Y Uchiyama	w/o
(Ecuador) A Andrade (Hong Kong) C Wong
(South Korea) S-c Hong (Canada) K Stevenson	6^{4}	3
WC	(United States) O Baris (United States) N Basavareddy	7^{7}	6
WC	(United States) S Kirchheimer (United States) Q Vandecasteele	7^{7}	3	[5]
4	(United States) T Hilderbrand (United States) A Lawson	6^{5}	6	[10]
(Australia) L Saville (Australia) L Tu	6	7
(Colombia) N Mejía (Colombia) A Urrea	4	5
(Japan) K Uchida (Chinese Taipei) T-l Wu	5	3
2	(Australia) P Harper (Australia) C Puttergill	7	6

Quarterfinals
(United Kingdom) C Broom (United Kingdom) J Fearnley	6	7^{7}
(Japan) R Noguchi (Australia) A Taylor	2	6^{1}
3	(United States) M Kiger (Canada) B Sigouin	6	6
(Japan) J Trotter (Japan) Y Uchiyama	0	4
WC	(United States) O Baris (United States) N Basavareddy	3	6	[6]
4	(United States) T Hilderbrand (United States) A Lawson	6	4	[10]
(Australia) L Saville (Australia) L Tu	4	7	[10]
2	(Australia) P Harper (Australia) C Puttergill	6	5	[2]

Semifinals
(United Kingdom) C Broom (United Kingdom) J Fearnley	6	3	[10]
3	(United States) M Kiger (Canada) B Sigouin	2	6	[12]
4	(United States) T Hilderbrand (United States) A Lawson	6	6^{6}	[7]
(Australia) L Saville (Australia) L Tu	4	7^{8}	[10]

Final
3	(United States) M Kiger (Canada) B Sigouin	4	6	[3]
(Australia) L Saville (Australia) L Tu	6	3	[10]
