= 2019 Challenger La Manche – Doubles =

Doubles
- 2019 Challenger La Manche

Final
- Champions: (United States) Robert Galloway (United States) Nathaniel Lammons
- Runners-up: (Spain) Javier Barranco Cosano (Italy) Raúl Brancaccio
- Score: 4–6, 7–6^{(7–4)}, [10–8]

Events
Singles	Doubles
← 2018 ·	Challenger La Manche	· 2020 →

Romain Arneodo and Tristan-Samuel Weissborn were the defending champions but chose not to defend their title.

Robert Galloway and Nathaniel Lammons won the title after defeating Javier Barranco Cosano and Raúl Brancaccio 4–6, 7–6^{(7–4)}, [10–8] in the final.

== Seeds ==
1. (India) Jeevan Nedunchezhiyan / (India) Purav Raja (semifinals)
2. (United States) Robert Galloway / (United States) Nathaniel Lammons (champions)
3. (Switzerland) Luca Margaroli / (Spain) David Vega Hernández (quarterfinals)
4. (Sweden) Andreas Siljeström / (Poland) Szymon Walków (quarterfinals)

== Draw ==
Key

- Q = Qualifier
- WC = Wild card
- LL = Lucky loser
- Alt = Alternate
- ITF = ITF entry
- PR = Protected ranking
- SR = Special ranking
- SE = Special exempt
- JE = Junior exempt
- JR = Junior Accelerator Programme entrant
- CO = College Accelerator Programme entrant
- NG = Next Gen Accelerator Program entrant
- w/o = Walkover
- r = Retired
- d = Defaulted

First round
1	(India) J Nedunchezhiyan (India) P Raja	6	6
(Serbia) N Čačić (Croatia) T Draganja	3	2
(Germany) M Moraing (Germany) O Otte	7	6
WC	(France) Baptiste Crepatte (Russia) R Safiullin	5	2
4	(Sweden) A Siljeström (Poland) S Walków	6^{4}	6	[10]
(Czech Republic) Z Kolář (Netherlands) M Vervoort	7^{7}	1	[4]
ITF	(Spain) J Barranco Cosano (Italy) R Brancaccio	2	6	[10]
ITF	(Guatemala) W González (France) Hugo Voljacques	6	4	[7]
(France) B Bonzi (France) U Humbert	6	4
WC	(France) E Benchetrit (France) G Blancaneaux	1	1^{r}
(France) J Eysseric (Croatia) V Galović	7^{7}	3	[8]
2	(United States) R Galloway (United States) N Lammons	6^{3}	6	[10]

Quarterfinals
1	(India) J Nedunchezhiyan (India) P Raja	w/o
(Germany) M Moraing (Germany) O Otte
4	(Sweden) A Siljeström (Poland) S Walków	4	6^{4}
ITF	(Spain) J Barranco Cosano (Italy) R Brancaccio	6	7^{7}
(France) B Bonzi (France) U Humbert	6	6
3	(Switzerland) L Margaroli (Spain) D Vega Hernández	1	1
Alt	(Spain) A Artuñedo (Italy) R Bonadio	4	1
2	(United States) R Galloway (United States) N Lammons	6	6

Semifinals
1	(India) J Nedunchezhiyan (India) P Raja	4	6	[6]
ITF	(Spain) J Barranco Cosano (Italy) R Brancaccio	6	3	[10]
(France) B Bonzi (France) U Humbert	4	4
2	(United States) R Galloway (United States) N Lammons	6	6

Final
ITF	(Spain) J Barranco Cosano (Italy) R Brancaccio	6	6^{4}	[8]
2	(United States) R Galloway (United States) N Lammons	4	7^{7}	[10]
