= 2020 Challenger La Manche – Doubles =

Doubles
- 2020 Challenger La Manche

Final
- Champions: (Russia) Pavel Kotov (Russia) Roman Safiullin
- Runners-up: (France) Dan Added (France) Albano Olivetti
- Score: 7–6^{(8–6)}, 5–7, [12–10]

Events
Singles	Doubles
← 2019 ·	Challenger La Manche	· 2021 →

Robert Galloway and Nathaniel Lammons were the defending champions but chose not to defend their title.

Pavel Kotov and Roman Safiullin won the title after defeating Dan Added and Albano Olivetti 7–6^{(8–6)}, 5–7, [12–10] in the final.

== Seeds ==
1. (Kazakhstan) Andrey Golubev / (Kazakhstan) Aleksandr Nedovyesov (quarterfinals)
2. (Croatia) Ivan Sabanov / (Croatia) Matej Sabanov (quarterfinals)
3. (France) Quentin Halys / (France) Tristan Lamasine (first round)
4. (United Kingdom) Scott Clayton / (Poland) Szymon Walków (first round)

== Draw ==
=== Key ===
- Q = Qualifier
- WC = Wild card
- LL = Lucky loser
- Alt = Alternate
- SE = Special exempt
- PR = Protected ranking
- ITF = ITF entry
- JE = Junior exempt
- w/o = Walkover
- r = Retired
- d = Defaulted
- SR = Special ranking

First round
1	(Kazakhstan) A Golubev (Kazakhstan) A Nedovyesov	3	6	[10]
(Russia) M Elgin (Russia) T Gabashvili	6	4	[5]
WC	(France) M Bourgue (France) H Mayot	w/o
(France) H Grenier (France) M Janvier
4	(United Kingdom) S Clayton (Poland) S Walków	5	2
(Germany) M Moraing (Germany) M Zverev	7	6
Alt	(Russia) P Kotov (Russia) R Safiullin	7^{7}	6
(Croatia) T Draganja (Spain) S Martos Gornés	6^{3}	3
(Turkey) C İlkel (Austria) L Miedler	1	6^{5}
(Czech Republic) Z Kolář (Argentina) M Trungelliti	6	7^{7}
WC	(France) D Added (France) A Olivetti	7^{12}	7
3	(France) Q Halys (France) T Lamasine	6^{10}	5
(Belgium) R Bemelmans (Germany) D Brown	1	7^{7}	[12]
WC	(France) K de Schepper (France) H Gaston	6	6^{5}	[10]
(Russia) A Vatutin (Spain) B Zapata Miralles	2	5
2	(Croatia) I Sabanov (Croatia) M Sabanov	6	7

Quarterfinals
1	(Kazakhstan) A Golubev (Kazakhstan) A Nedovyesov	3	6	[5]
WC	(France) M Bourgue (France) H Mayot	6	2	[10]
(Germany) M Moraing (Germany) M Zverev	7	2	[9]
Alt	(Russia) P Kotov (Russia) R Safiullin	5	6	[11]
(Czech Republic) Z Kolář (Argentina) M Trungelliti	6^{5}	4
WC	(France) D Added (France) A Olivetti	7^{7}	6
(Belgium) R Bemelmans (Germany) D Brown	6	7^{7}
2	(Croatia) I Sabanov (Croatia) M Sabanov	2	6^{4}

Semifinals
WC	(France) M Bourgue (France) H Mayot
Alt	(Russia) P Kotov (Russia) R Safiullin	w/o
WC	(France) D Added (France) A Olivetti	4	7^{7}	[10]
(Belgium) R Bemelmans (Germany) D Brown	6	6^{5}	[5]

Final
Alt	(Russia) P Kotov (Russia) R Safiullin	7^{8}	5	[12]
WC	(France) D Added (France) A Olivetti	6^{6}	7	[10]
