= 2019 Challenger La Manche =

- Date: 12–18 February
- Edition: 26th
- Draw: 48S / 16D
- Surface: Hard (indoor)
- Location: Cherbourg, France

Champions

Singles
- (France) Ugo Humbert

Doubles
- (United States) Robert Galloway / (United States) Nathaniel Lammons
← 2018 ·	Challenger La Manche	· 2020 →

The 2019 Challenger La Manche was a professional tennis tournament played on indoor hard courts. It was the 26th edition of the tournament which was part of the 2019 ATP Challenger Tour. It took place in Cherbourg, France between 11 and 17 February 2019.

== Singles main-draw entrants ==
=== Seeds ===
Country	Player	Rank^{1}	Seed
FRA	Ugo Humbert	86	1
GER	Yannick Maden	121	2
ITA	Stefano Travaglia	122	3
BEL	Ruben Bemelmans	132	4
ITA	Simone Bolelli	137	5
CZE	Lukáš Rosol	141	6
ITA	Gianluigi Quinzi	153	7
ITA	Luca Vanni	154	8
GER	Oscar Otte	165	9
KAZ	Alexander Bublik	172	10
GER	Rudolf Molleker	182	11
GER	Mats Moraing	186	12
ESP	Daniel Gimeno Traver	188	13
FRA	Nicolas Mahut	195	14
BEL	Arthur De Greef	202	15
RUS	Alexey Vatutin	212	16

- ^{1} Rankings are as of 4 February 2019.

=== Other entrants ===
The following players received wildcards into the singles main draw:

- (France) Antoine Cornut-Chauvinc
- (France) Laurent Lokoli
- (France) Nicolas Mahut
- (France) Matteo Martineau
- (France) Clément Tabur

The following players received entry into the singles main draw as alternates:

- (Spain) Andrés Artuñedo
- (France) Alexandre Müller

The following players received entry into the singles main draw using their ITF World Tennis Ranking:

- (Spain) Javier Barranco Cosano
- (Italy) Raúl Brancaccio
- (France) Baptiste Crepatte
- (Russia) Roman Safiullin

The following players received entry from the qualifying draw:

- (Italy) Riccardo Bonadio
- (France) Manuel Guinard

== Champions ==
=== Singles ===
- (France) Ugo Humbert def. (Belgium) Steve Darcis 6–7^{(6–8)}, 6–3, 6–3.

=== Doubles ===
- (United States) Robert Galloway / (United States) Nathaniel Lammons def. (Spain) Javier Barranco Cosano / (Italy) Raúl Brancaccio 4–6, 7–6^{(7–4)}, [10–8].
