= 2022 Chicago Men's Challenger – Doubles =

Doubles
- 2022 Chicago Men's Challenger

Final
- Champions: (Sweden) André Göransson (Japan) Ben McLachlan
- Runners-up: (United States) Evan King (United States) Mitchell Krueger
- Score: 6–4, 6–7^{(3–7)}, [10–5]

Events
Singles	Doubles
Chicago Men's Challenger	· 2023 →

This was the first edition of the tournament.

André Göransson and Ben McLachlan won the title after defeating Evan King and Mitchell Krueger 6–4, 6–7^{(3–7)}, [10–5] in the final.

== Seeds ==
1. (United States) Nathaniel Lammons / (United States) Jackson Withrow (quarterfinals)
2. (Sweden) André Göransson / (Japan) Ben McLachlan (champions)
3. (Belgium) Sander Gillé / (Australia) John-Patrick Smith (quarterfinals)
4. (Mexico) Hans Hach Verdugo / (United States) Hunter Reese (first round)

== Draw ==
=== Key ===
- Q = Qualifier
- WC = Wild card
- LL = Lucky loser
- Alt = Alternate
- ITF = ITF entry
- PR = Protected ranking
- SR = Special ranking
- SE = Special exempt
- JE = Junior exempt
- JR = Junior Accelerator Programme entrant
- CO = College Accelerator Programme entrant
- NG = Next Gen Accelerator Program entrant
- w/o = Walkover
- r = Retired
- d = Defaulted

First round
1	(United States) N Lammons (United States) J Withrow	6	6
(Czech Republic) D Svrčina (Greece) Pe Tsitsipas	2	4
(United Kingdom) J Cash (United Kingdom) H Patten	4	7	[7]
(United States) S Kozlov (Japan) K Uchida	6	5	[10]
4	(Mexico) H Hach Verdugo (United States) H Reese	1	3
(United States) E King (United States) M Krueger	6	6
(France) E Couacaud (United States) M Schnur	6	6^{5}	[3]
WC	(United States) C Eubanks (United States) B Shelton	4	7^{7}	[10]
PR	(India) Y Bhambri (India) S Myneni	4	6	[14]
(Australia) L Saville (Australia) J Thompson	6	3	[12]
WC	(United States) B Holt (United States) N Monroe	4	5
3	(Belgium) S Gillé (Australia) J-P Smith	6	7
(Netherlands) G Brouwer (United States) R Stalder	7^{7}	6
(United States) R Galloway (United States) A Lawson	6^{5}	3
(Philippines) R Gonzales (New Zealand) A Sitak	1	2
2	(Sweden) A Göransson (Japan) B McLachlan	6	6

Quarterfinals
1	(United States) N Lammons (United States) J Withrow	6	6^{6}	[5]
(United States) S Kozlov (Japan) K Uchida	3	7^{8}	[10]
(United States) E King (United States) M Krueger	6	6
WC	(United States) C Eubanks (United States) B Shelton	2	4
PR	(India) Y Bhambri (India) S Myneni	4	7^{10}	[13]
3	(Belgium) S Gillé (Australia) J-P Smith	6	6^{8}	[11]
(Netherlands) G Brouwer (United States) R Stalder	5	6	[7]
2	(Sweden) A Göransson (Japan) B McLachlan	7	1	[10]

Semifinals
(United States) S Kozlov (Japan) K Uchida
(United States) E King (United States) M Krueger	w/o
PR	(India) Y Bhambri (India) S Myneni	5	6	[3]
2	(Sweden) A Göransson (Japan) B McLachlan	7	4	[10]

Final
(United States) E King (United States) M Krueger	4	7^{7}	[5]
2	(Sweden) A Göransson (Japan) B McLachlan	6	6^{3}	[10]
