= 2019 Challenger La Manche – Singles =

Singles
- 2019 Challenger La Manche

Final
- Champion: (France) Ugo Humbert
- Runner-up: (Belgium) Steve Darcis
- Score: 6–7^{(6–8)}, 6–3, 6–3

Events
Singles	Doubles
← 2018 ·	Challenger La Manche	· 2020 →

Maximilian Marterer was the defending champion but chose not to defend his title.

Ugo Humbert won the title after defeating Steve Darcis 6–7^{(6–8)}, 6–3, 6–3 in the final.

== Seeds ==
All seeds receive a bye into the second round.

1. (France) Ugo Humbert (champion)
2. (Germany) Yannick Maden (third round)
3. (Italy) Stefano Travaglia (semifinals)
4. (Belgium) Ruben Bemelmans (third round)
5. (Italy) Simone Bolelli (third round)
6. (Czech Republic) Lukáš Rosol (quarterfinals)
7. (Italy) Gianluigi Quinzi (third round)
8. (Italy) Luca Vanni (quarterfinals)
9. (Germany) Oscar Otte (quarterfinals)
10. (Kazakhstan) Alexander Bublik (second round)
11. (Germany) Rudolf Molleker (second round)
12. (Germany) Mats Moraing (semifinals)
13. (Spain) Daniel Gimeno Traver (second round)
14. (France) Nicolas Mahut (quarterfinals, withdrew)
15. (Belgium) Arthur De Greef (second round, retired)
16. (Russia) Alexey Vatutin (third round)

== Draw ==
=== Key ===
- Q = Qualifier
- WC = Wild card
- LL = Lucky loser
- Alt = Alternate
- SE = Special exempt
- PR = Protected ranking
- ITF = ITF entry
- JE = Junior exempt
- w/o = Walkover
- r = Retired
- d = Defaulted
- SR = Special ranking

=== Finals ===
Quarterfinals
1	(France) Ugo Humbert	6	6
9	(Germany) Oscar Otte	4	4
14/WC	(France) Nicolas Mahut
12	(Germany) Mats Moraing	w/o
8	(Italy) Luca Vanni	6	3	4
3	(Italy) Stefano Travaglia	3	6	6
6	(Czech Republic) Lukáš Rosol	3	5
(Belgium) Steve Darcis	6	7

Semifinals
1	(France) Ugo Humbert	6^{3}	6	6
12	(Germany) Mats Moraing	7^{7}	4	2
3	(Italy) Stefano Travaglia	7^{7}	3	3
(Belgium) Steve Darcis	6^{2}	6	6

Final
1	(France) Ugo Humbert	6^{6}	6	6
(Belgium) Steve Darcis	7^{8}	3	3

=== Top half ===
==== Section 1 ====
First round
(France) E Benchetrit	6	6
(France) M Bourgue	3	4
Q	(France) M Guinard	7	6
(Czech Republic) V Šafránek	5	4
WC	(France) C Tabur	3	1
(Slovakia) F Horanský	6	6
(Italy) GM Moroni	7	6
ITF	(Russia) R Safiullin	5	2

Second round
1	(France) U Humbert	7^{9}	6
(France) E Benchetrit	6^{7}	1
Q	(France) M Guinard	3	2
16	(Russia) A Vatutin	6	6
9	(Germany) O Otte	7	6
(Slovakia) F Horanský	5	2
(Italy) GM Moroni	2	2
7	(Italy) G Quinzi	6	6

Third round
1	(France) U Humbert	6	6
16	(Russia) A Vatutin	3	4
9	(Germany) O Otte	7^{7}	6
7	(Italy) G Quinzi	6^{3}	1

Quarterfinals
1	(France) U Humbert	6	6
9	(Germany) O Otte	4	4

==== Section 2 ====
First round
(France) T Lamasine	6^{3}	6	4
(Spain) C Taberner	7^{7}	2	6
Alt	(Spain) A Artuñedo	4	6	4
Alt	(France) A Müller	6	4	6
(Croatia) V Galović	6	7
(Germany) D Masur	2	5
WC	(France) L Lokoli	4	6	6
(Spain) R Ojeda Lara	6	2	2

Second round
4	(Belgium) R Bemelmans	3	6	6
(Spain) C Taberner	6	1	2
Alt	(France) A Müller	6	3	6^{5}
14/WC	(France) N Mahut	1	6	7^{7}
12	(Germany) M Moraing	6	3	6
(Croatia) V Galović	4	6	1
WC	(France) L Lokoli	3	3
5	(Italy) S Bolelli	6	6

Third round
4	(Belgium) R Bemelmans	3	4
14/WC	(France) N Mahut	6	6
12	(Germany) M Moraing	6	7
5	(Italy) S Bolelli	4	5

Quarterfinals
14/WC	(France) N Mahut
12	(Germany) M Moraing	w/o

=== Bottom half ===
==== Section 3 ====
First round
(Belarus) U Ignatik	6	6
ITF	(Spain) J Barranco Cosano	3	3
Q	(Italy) R Bonadio	6	2	6^{6}
(France) B Bonzi	4	6	7^{8}
(France) TK Wang	6^{5}	4
ITF	(France) Baptiste Crepatte	7^{7}	6
(France) M Janvier	6	2	7^{11}
WC	(France) M Martineau	4	6	6^{9}

Second round
8	(Italy) L Vanni	6	6
(Belarus) U Ignatik	1	4
(France) B Bonzi	7^{7}	7
11	(Germany) R Molleker	6^{2}	5
13	(Spain) D Gimeno Traver	6^{1}	2
ITF	(France) B Crepatte	7^{7}	6
(France) M Janvier	6	4	1
3	(Italy) S Travaglia	4	6	6

Third round
8	(Italy) L Vanni	6	3	7^{7}
(France) B Bonzi	4	6	6^{4}
ITF	(France) B Crepatte	3	2
3	(Italy) S Travaglia	6	6

Quarterfinals
8	(Italy) L Vanni	6	3	4
3	(Italy) S Travaglia	3	6	6

==== Section 4 ====
First round
(Portugal) J Domingues	2	6	6^{4}
WC	(France) Antoine Cornut-Chauvinc	6	3	7^{7}
(Spain) R Ortega Olmedo	1	2
(Czech Republic) Z Kolář	6	6
(Spain) B Zapata Miralles	6	2	1
(Belgium) S Darcis	1	6	6
ITF	(Italy) R Brancaccio	6	6
(Turkey) C İlkel	2	4

Second round
6	(Czech Republic) L Rosol	6	6
WC	(France) A Cornut-Chauvinc	4	2
(Czech Republic) Z Kolář	6	6
10	(Kazakhstan) A Bublik	2	3
15	(Belgium) A De Greef	1	0^{r}
(Belgium) S Darcis	6	0
ITF	(Italy) R Brancaccio	3	1
2	(Germany) Y Maden	6	6

Third round
6	(Czech Republic) L Rosol	6	3	6
(Czech Republic) Z Kolář	3	6	0
(Belgium) S Darcis	6	3	7^{7}
2	(Germany) Y Maden	4	6	6^{5}

Quarterfinals
6	(Czech Republic) L Rosol	3	5
(Belgium) S Darcis	6	7
