= 2022 Chicago Men's Challenger – Singles =

Singles
- 2022 Chicago Men's Challenger

Final
- Champion: Roman Safiullin
- Runner-up: (United States) Ben Shelton
- Score: 6–3, 4–6, 7–5

Events
Singles	Doubles
Chicago Men's Challenger	· 2023 →

This was the first edition of the tournament.

Roman Safiullin won the title after defeating Ben Shelton 6–3, 4–6, 7–5 in the final.

== Seeds ==
1. (Switzerland) Henri Laaksonen (first round)
2. (Australia) Christopher O'Connell (second round)
3. (United States) Stefan Kozlov (first round)
4. (Australia) Jordan Thompson (quarterfinals)
5. (Moldova) Radu Albot (semifinals)
6. (Ecuador) Emilio Gómez (withdrew)
7. Roman Safiullin (champion)
8. (Spain) Fernando Verdasco (withdrew)

== Draw ==
=== Key ===
- Q = Qualifier
- WC = Wild card
- LL = Lucky loser
- Alt = Alternate
- SE = Special exempt
- PR = Protected ranking
- ITF = ITF entry
- JE = Junior exempt
- w/o = Walkover
- r = Retired
- d = Defaulted
- SR = Special ranking

=== Finals ===
Semifinals
5	(Moldova) Radu Albot	5	3
7	Roman Safiullin	7	6
WC	(United States) Ben Shelton	6	7
(Netherlands) Gijs Brouwer	3	5

Final
7	Roman Safiullin	6	4	7
WC	(United States) Ben Shelton	3	6	5

=== Top half ===
First round
1	(Switzerland) H Laaksonen	6	6^{5}	4
(Croatia) B Gojo	3	7^{7}	6
Alt	(Kazakhstan) M Kukushkin	3	6	6
WC	(United States) G Nanda	6	4	3
(France) A Escoffier	7^{7}	6
(Japan) K Uchida	6^{5}	3
Q	(France) E Couacaud	2	3
5	(Moldova) R Albot	6	6
3	(United States) S Kozlov	4	6^{2}
(United States) E Escobedo	6	7^{7}
Q	(United Kingdom) A McHugh	4	2
LL	(United States) Z Svajda	6	6
(Czech Republic) D Svrčina	6	4	3
Alt	(Argentina) GA Olivieri	4	6	6
(United States) M Krueger	3	3
7	R Safiullin	6	6

Second round
(Croatia) B Gojo	6	6^{1}	6
Alt	(Kazakhstan) M Kukushkin	3	7^{7}	1
(France) A Escoffier	4	2
5	(Moldova) R Albot	6	6
(United States) E Escobedo	4	2
LL	(United States) Z Svajda	6	6
Alt	(Argentina) GA Olivieri	4	6	0
7	R Safiullin	6	4	6

Quarterfinals
(Croatia) B Gojo	6	2	4
5	(Moldova) R Albot	4	6	6
LL	(United States) Z Svajda	3	7^{7}	3
7	R Safiullin	6	6^{4}	6

Semifinals
5	(Moldova) R Albot	5	3
7	R Safiullin	7	6

=== Bottom half ===
First round
Q	(United Kingdom) B Harris	6	4	6
WC	(United States) A Kovacevic	3	6	3
(Kazakhstan) D Popko	0	6^{5}
WC	(United States) B Shelton	6	7^{7}
(United States) C Eubanks	6^{5}	6^{9}
Q	(United States) R Harrison	7^{7}	7^{11}
(United Kingdom) P Jubb	6^{8}	7^{7}	3
4	(Australia) J Thompson	7^{10}	6^{5}	6
LL	(Australia) L Tu	3	2
(United Kingdom) L Broady	6	6
Q	(United States) B Holt	4	6	6
(Switzerland) A Ritschard	6	2	2
Q	(United States) K Smith	3	4
(Netherlands) G Brouwer	6	6
LL	(United States) E Zhu	3	4
2	(Australia) C O'Connell	6	6

Second round
Q	(United Kingdom) B Harris	3	2
WC	(United States) B Shelton	6	6
Q	(United States) R Harrison	3	3
4	(Australia) J Thompson	6	6
(United Kingdom) L Broady	6	4	6
Q	(United States) B Holt	4	6	4
(Netherlands) G Brouwer	7	6
2	(Australia) C O'Connell	5	4

Quarterfinals
WC	(United States) B Shelton	7^{14}	6
4	(Australia) J Thompson	6^{12}	4
(United Kingdom) L Broady	2	4
(Netherlands) G Brouwer	6	6

Semifinals
WC	(United States) B Shelton	6	7
(Netherlands) G Brouwer	3	5
