= 2025 Chicago Men's Challenger – Doubles =

Doubles
- 2025 Chicago Men's Challenger

Final
- Champions: (United States) Mac Kiger (United States) Ryan Seggerman
- Runners-up: (United States) Theodore Winegar (United States) Michael Zheng
- Score: 6–4, 3–6, [10–5]

Events
Singles	Doubles
← 2024 ·	Chicago Men's Challenger	· 2026 →

Luke Saville and Li Tu were the defending champions but chose not to defend their title.

Mac Kiger and Ryan Seggerman won the title after defeating Theodore Winegar and Michael Zheng 6–4, 3–6, [10–5] in the final.

== Seeds ==
1. (United States) Evan King / (United States) Jackson Withrow (quarterfinals)
2. (France) Sadio Doumbia / (United States) Nathaniel Lammons (first round)
3. (United States) George Goldhoff / (Chinese Taipei) Ray Ho (first round)
4. (India) Anirudh Chandrasekar / (India) Ramkumar Ramanathan (first round)

== Draw ==
=== Key ===
- Q = Qualifier
- WC = Wild card
- LL = Lucky loser
- Alt = Alternate
- ITF = ITF entry
- PR = Protected ranking
- SR = Special ranking
- SE = Special exempt
- JE = Junior exempt
- JR = Junior Accelerator Programme entrant
- CO = College Accelerator Programme entrant
- NG = Next Gen Accelerator Program entrant
- w/o = Walkover
- r = Retired
- d = Defaulted

=== Draw ===
First round
1	(United States) E King (United States) J Withrow	7	6
PR	(Chinese Taipei) J Jung (United States) R Stalder	5	2
(United States) M Kiger (United States) R Seggerman	6^{4}	6	[10]
(Mexico) R Pacheco Méndez (Paraguay) AD Vallejo	7^{7}	2	[3]
3	(United States) G Goldhoff (Chinese Taipei) R Ho	3	4
(Canada) C Harper (India) D Suresh	6	6
(Australia) B Bayldon (Colombia) C Rodríguez	7^{8}	5	[10]
(United States) A Perez (Kazakhstan) B Zhukayev	6^{6}	7	[8]
(Lebanon) H Habib (United States) T Hilderbrand	4	6	[8]
WC	(United States) T Winegar (United States) M Zheng	6	4	[10]
(Chinese Taipei) Y-h Hsu (Chinese Taipei) T-h Huang	7^{7}	5	[10]
4	(India) A Chandrasekar (India) R Ramanathan	6^{3}	7	[7]
(New Zealand) F Reynolds (New Zealand) J Watt	6	6^{2}	[10]
(Australia) P Harper (Thailand) P Isaro	3	7^{7}	[6]
WC	(United States) A Fenty (Barbados) D King	4	7	[10]
2	(France) S Doumbia (United States) N Lammons	6	5	[8]

Quarterfinals
1	(United States) E King (United States) J Withrow	6^{5}	2
(United States) M Kiger (United States) R Seggerman	7^{7}	6
(Canada) C Harper (India) D Suresh	6	6
(Australia) B Bayldon (Colombia) C Rodríguez	4	3
WC	(United States) T Winegar (United States) M Zheng	6	6
(Chinese Taipei) Y-h Hsu (Chinese Taipei) T-h Huang	4	4
(New Zealand) F Reynolds (New Zealand) J Watt	4	6	[5]
WC	(United States) A Fenty (Barbados) D King	6	3	[10]

Semifinals
(United States) M Kiger (United States) R Seggerman	7^{7}	7^{7}
(Canada) C Harper (India) D Suresh	6^{3}	6^{5}
WC	(United States) T Winegar (United States) M Zheng	6	6
WC	(United States) A Fenty (Barbados) D King	2	4

Final
(United States) M Kiger (United States) R Seggerman	6	3	[10]
WC	(United States) T Winegar (United States) M Zheng	4	6	[5]
