= 2020 Challenger La Manche – Singles =

Singles
- 2020 Challenger La Manche

Final
- Champion: (Russia) Roman Safiullin
- Runner-up: (Italy) Roberto Marcora
- Score: 6–4, 6–2

Events
Singles	Doubles
← 2019 ·	Challenger La Manche	· 2021 →

Ugo Humbert was the defending champion but chose not to defend his title.

Roman Safiullin won the title after defeating Roberto Marcora 6–4, 6–2 in the final.

== Seeds ==
All seeds receive a bye into the second round.

1. (France) Antoine Hoang (semifinals)
2. (Italy) Roberto Marcora (final)
3. (France) Maxime Janvier (third round)
4. (Argentina) Marco Trungelliti (second round)
5. (France) Quentin Halys (quarterfinals)
6. (Turkey) Cem İlkel (second round)
7. (France) Constant Lestienne (second round)
8. (Spain) Bernabé Zapata Miralles (third round)
9. (Japan) Hiroki Moriya (second round)
10. (Russia) Alexey Vatutin (second round)
11. (Germany) Matthias Bachinger (quarterfinals)
12. (Czech Republic) Zdeněk Kolář (quarterfinals)
13. (Italy) Matteo Viola (second round)
14. (France) Tristan Lamasine (second round)
15. (France) Mathias Bourgue (second round)
16. (Spain) Nicola Kuhn (second round)

== Draw ==
=== Key ===
- Q = Qualifier
- WC = Wild card
- LL = Lucky loser
- Alt = Alternate
- SE = Special exempt
- PR = Protected ranking
- ITF = ITF entry
- JE = Junior exempt
- w/o = Walkover
- r = Retired
- d = Defaulted
- SR = Special ranking

=== Finals ===
Quarterfinals
1	(France) Antoine Hoang	6	6
11	(Germany) Matthias Bachinger	1	2
(Russia) Roman Safiullin	6	3	6
5	(France) Quentin Halys	2	6	3
(Bosnia and Herzegovina) Mirza Bašić	4	4
(Germany) Mischa Zverev	6	6
12	(Czech Republic) Zdeněk Kolář	2	2
2	(Italy) Roberto Marcora	6	6

Semifinals
1	(France) Antoine Hoang	2	6	1
(Russia) Roman Safiullin	6	3	6
(Germany) Mischa Zverev	4	6	6^{9}
2	(Italy) Roberto Marcora	6	4	7^{11}

Final
(Russia) Roman Safiullin	6	6
2	(Italy) Roberto Marcora	4	2

=== Top half ===
==== Section 1 ====
First round
(Russia) P Kotov	6	3	6^{1}
WC	(France) H Mayot	3	6	7^{7}
(Italy) R Brancaccio	0	3
(Russia) T Gabashvili	6	6
(France) H Gaston	7^{7}	4	4
(Germany) M Marterer	6^{5}	6	6
(Kazakhstan) A Nedovyesov	6	3	7^{7}
(Belarus) U Ignatik	3	6	6^{4}

Second round
1	(France) A Hoang	4	6	7^{7}
WC	(France) H Mayot	6	3	6^{4}
(Russia) T Gabashvili	7^{7}	6
16	(Spain) N Kuhn	6^{3}	1
11	(Germany) M Bachinger	2	7^{7}	6
(Germany) M Marterer	6	6^{5}	4
(Kazakhstan) A Nedovyesov	6^{2}	2
8	(Spain) B Zapata Miralles	7^{7}	6

Third round
1	(France) A Hoang	6	5	6
(Russia) T Gabashvili	4	7	4
11	(Germany) M Bachinger	7	6
8	(Spain) B Zapata Miralles	5	2

Quarterfinals
1	(France) A Hoang	6	6
11	(Germany) M Bachinger	1	2

==== Section 2 ====
First round
(France) H Grenier	6	6
WC	(France) D Added	3	2
(Russia) R Safiullin	6	6
(Germany) D Brown	1	2
(Austria) L Miedler	1	5
WC	(Italy) L Musetti	6	7
(Ukraine) I Marchenko	6	6
(Germany) M Moraing	3	4

Second round
3	(France) M Janvier	6	4	6
(France) H Grenier	1	6	3
(Russia) R Safiullin	6	1	7
15	(France) M Bourgue	2	6	5
9	(Japan) H Moriya	4	4
WC	(Italy) L Musetti	6	6
(Ukraine) I Marchenko	3	7^{7}	6^{4}
5	(France) Q Halys	6	6^{5}	7^{7}

Third round
3	(France) M Janvier	6	4	5
(Russia) R Safiullin	3	6	7
WC	(Italy) L Musetti	7^{10}	4	3
5	(France) Q Halys	6^{8}	6	6

Quarterfinals
(Russia) R Safiullin	6	3	6
5	(France) Q Halys	2	6	3

=== Bottom half ===
==== Section 3 ====
First round
(Bosnia and Herzegovina) M Bašić	6	6
(Italy) L Vanni	3	4
(Bulgaria) D Kuzmanov	4	2
(Italy) A Arnaboldi	6	6
(Belgium) R Bemelmans	6	6
(Italy) A Pellegrino	3	1
(Germany) M Zverev	6	7
Q	(Czech Republic) V Kopřiva	2	5

Second round
6	(Turkey) C İlkel	6	2	3
(Bosnia and Herzegovina) M Bašić	3	6	6
(Italy) A Arnaboldi	7^{7}	6
10	(Russia) A Vatutin	6^{3}	2
14	(France) T Lamasine	4	7^{7}	3
(Belgium) R Bemelmans	6	6^{2}	6
(Germany) M Zverev	6	6
4	(Argentina) M Trungelliti	0	4

Third round
(Bosnia and Herzegovina) M Bašić	4	7^{7}	6
(Italy) A Arnaboldi	6	6^{3}	3
(Belgium) R Bemelmans	2	4
(Germany) M Zverev	6	6

Quarterfinals
(Bosnia and Herzegovina) M Bašić	4	4
(Germany) M Zverev	6	6

==== Section 4 ====
First round
WC	(France) K de Schepper	3	6	4
WC	(France) M Martineau	6	4	6
(Norway) V Durasovic	3	6^{8}
(Croatia) N Serdarušić	6	7^{10}
(Slovakia) L Klein	2	6^{2}
Q	(France) Jules Marie	6	7^{7}
(Belgium) A De Greef	6	6
(Sweden) M Eriksson	4	4

Second round
7	(France) C Lestienne	3	6^{5}
WC	(France) M Martineau	6	7^{7}
(Croatia) N Serdarušić	5	7^{7}	4
12	(Czech Republic) Z Kolář	7	6^{4}	6
13	(Italy) M Viola	3	6	6^{5}
Q	(France) J Marie	6	3	7^{7}
(Belgium) A De Greef	3	4
2	(Italy) R Marcora	6	6

Third round
WC	(France) M Martineau	6	4	4
12	(Czech Republic) Z Kolář	2	6	6
Q	(France) J Marie	6^{3}	5
2	(Italy) R Marcora	7^{7}	7

Quarterfinals
12	(Czech Republic) Z Kolář	2	2
2	(Italy) R Marcora	6	6
