= 2020 Challenger La Manche =

- Date: 9–16 February
- Edition: 27th
- Draw: 48S / 16D
- Surface: Hard (indoor)
- Location: Cherbourg, France

Champions

Singles
- (Russia) Roman Safiullin

Doubles
- (Russia) Pavel Kotov / (Russia) Roman Safiullin
← 2019 ·	Challenger La Manche	· 2021 →

The 2020 Challenger La Manche was a professional tennis tournament played on indoor hard courts. It was the 27th edition of the tournament which was part of the 2020 ATP Challenger Tour. It took place in Cherbourg, France between 9 and 16 February 2020.

== Singles main-draw entrants ==
=== Seeds ===
Country	Player	Rank^{1}	Seed
FRA	Antoine Hoang	126	1
ITA	Roberto Marcora	174	2
FRA	Maxime Janvier	180	3
ARG	Marco Trungelliti	195	4
FRA	Quentin Halys	199	5
TUR	Cem İlkel	200	6
FRA	Constant Lestienne	203	7
ESP	Bernabé Zapata Miralles	209	8
JPN	Hiroki Moriya	211	9
RUS	Alexey Vatutin	212	10
GER	Matthias Bachinger	213	11
CZE	Zdeněk Kolář	217	12
ITA	Matteo Viola	218	13
FRA	Tristan Lamasine	221	14
FRA	Mathias Bourgue	225	15
ESP	Nicola Kuhn	227	16

- ^{1} Rankings are as of 3 February 2020.

=== Other entrants ===
The following players received wildcards into the singles main draw:

- (France) Dan Added
- (France) Kenny de Schepper
- (France) Matteo Martineau
- (France) Harold Mayot
- (Italy) Lorenzo Musetti

The following players received entry from the qualifying draw:

- (Czech Republic) Vít Kopřiva
- (France) Jules Marie

== Champions ==
=== Singles ===
- (Russia) Roman Safiullin def. (Italy) Roberto Marcora 6–4, 6–2.

=== Doubles ===
- (Russia) Pavel Kotov / (Russia) Roman Safiullin def. (France) Dan Added / (France) Albano Olivetti 7–6^{(8–6)}, 5–7, [12–10].
