= 2023 Chicago Men's Challenger =

- Date: 10–16 July
- Edition: 2nd
- Surface: Hard
- Location: Chicago, United States

Champions

Singles
- (United States) Alex Michelsen

Doubles
- (Latvia) Miķelis Lībietis / (Tunisia) Skander Mansouri
← 2022 ·	Chicago Men's Challenger	· 2024 →

The 2023 Chicago Men's Challenger was a professional tennis tournament played on hardcourts. It was the second edition of the tournament which was part of the 2023 ATP Challenger Tour. It took place in Chicago, United States between July 10 and July 16, 2023.

== Singles main draw entrants ==
=== Seeds ===
Country	Player	Rank^{1}	Seed
~~AUS~~	~~James Duckworth~~	~~110~~	~~1~~
USA	Aleksandar Kovacevic	120	2
ECU	Emilio Gómez	127	3
CHN	Shang Juncheng	155	4
TUR	Altuğ Çelikbilek	211	5
CAN	Alexis Galarneau	215	6
FRA	Giovanni Mpetshi Perricard	218	7
USA	Steve Johnson	219	8

- ^{1} Rankings as of 3 July 2023.

=== Other entrants ===
The following players received wildcards into the singles main draw:

- (Japan) Kei Nishikori
- (United States) Ethan Quinn
- (United States) Eliot Spizzirri

The following player received entry into the singles main draw as a special exempt:

- (Kazakhstan) Mikhail Kukushkin

The following players received entry into the singles main draw as alternates:

- (Chinese Taipei) Jason Jung
- (Tunisia) Skander Mansouri
- (Australia) James McCabe
- (Japan) Yasutaka Uchiyama

The following players received entry from the qualifying draw:

- (South Korea) Chung Yun-seong
- (Mexico) Ernesto Escobedo
- (Australia) Omar Jasika
- (Ukraine) Illya Marchenko
- (Australia) Tristan Schoolkate
- (Australia) Bernard Tomic

The following player received entry as a lucky loser:

- (United States) Evan Zhu

== Champions ==
=== Singles ===
- (United States) Alex Michelsen def. (Japan) Yuta Shimizu 7–5, 6–2.

=== Doubles ===
- (Latvia) Miķelis Lībietis / (Tunisia) Skander Mansouri def. (South Korea) Chung Yun-seong / (Australia) Andrew Harris 7–6^{(7–5)}, 6–3.
