= 2021 Challenger La Manche – Doubles =

Doubles
- 2021 Challenger La Manche

Final
- Champions: (Slovakia) Lukáš Klein (Slovakia) Alex Molčan
- Runners-up: (France) Antoine Hoang (France) Albano Olivetti
- Score: 1–6, 7–5, [10–6]

Events
| Singles | Doubles |
- Challenger La Manche

Pavel Kotov and Roman Safiullin were the defending champions but chose not to defend their title.

Lukáš Klein and Alex Molčan won the title after defeating Antoine Hoang and Albano Olivetti 1–6, 7–5, [10–6] in the final.

== Seeds ==
1. (Sweden) André Göransson / (Netherlands) David Pel (semifinals)
2. (United States) Nathaniel Lammons / (United States) Jackson Withrow (quarterfinals)
3. (Poland) Karol Drzewiecki / (Czech Republic) Roman Jebavý (first round)
4. (Spain) Sergio Martos Gornés / (Portugal) Gonçalo Oliveira (semifinals)

== Draw ==
Key

- Q = Qualifier
- WC = Wild card
- LL = Lucky loser
- Alt = Alternate
- ITF = ITF entry
- PR = Protected ranking
- SR = Special ranking
- SE = Special exempt
- JE = Junior exempt
- JR = Junior Accelerator Programme entrant
- CO = College Accelerator Programme entrant
- NG = Next Gen Accelerator Program entrant
- w/o = Walkover
- r = Retired
- d = Defaulted

First round
1 | (Sweden) A Göransson (Netherlands) D Pel | 6 | 7^{7}
(France) S Doumbia (France) H Gaston | 3 | 6^{4}
(Ukraine) V Orlov (Poland) K Żuk | 7^{8} | 4 | [4]
(Netherlands) S Arends (Czech Republic) L Rosol | 6^{6} | 6 | [10]
3 | (Poland) K Drzewiecki (Czech Republic) R Jebavý | 6 | 6^{4} | [7]
WC | (Netherlands) I Sijsling (Netherlands) G Smits | 1 | 7^{7} | [10]
(Slovakia) L Klein (Slovakia) A Molčan | 6 | 6
(France) M Janvier (Spain) B Zapata Miralles | 0 | 3
(Russia) A Vatutin (Chinese Taipei) T-l Wu | 2 | 3
(France) M Guinard (United States) H Reese | 6 | 6
WC | (Belgium) R Bemelmans (France) J Eysseric | 6^{3} | 6 | [3]
4 | (Spain) S Martos Gornés (Portugal) G Oliveira | 7^{7} | 3 | [10]
(France) A Hoang (France) A Olivetti | 7 | 6
WC | (France) K de Schepper (France) M Martineau | 5 | 3
(United States) D Kudla (Sweden) R Lindstedt | 1 | 2
2 | (United States) N Lammons (United States) J Withrow | 6 | 6

Quarterfinals
1 | (Sweden) A Göransson (Netherlands) D Pel | 7^{7} | 1 | [10]
(Netherlands) S Arends (Czech Republic) L Rosol | 6^{5} | 6 | [5]
WC | (Netherlands) I Sijsling (Netherlands) G Smits | 6^{4} | 6^{9}
(Slovakia) L Klein (Slovakia) A Molčan | 7^{7} | 7^{11}
(France) M Guinard (United States) H Reese | 6^{3} | 6 | [11]
4 | (Spain) S Martos Gornés (Portugal) G Oliveira | 7^{7} | 4 | [13]
(France) A Hoang (France) A Olivetti | 6^{6} | 7^{7} | [10]
2 | (United States) N Lammons (United States) J Withrow | 7^{8} | 6^{3} | [5]

Semifinals
1 | (Sweden) A Göransson (Netherlands) D Pel | 6^{5} | 6^{1}
(Slovakia) L Klein (Slovakia) A Molčan | 7^{7} | 7^{7}
4 | (Spain) S Martos Gornés (Portugal) G Oliveira | 7^{7} | 4 | [5]
(France) A Hoang (France) A Olivetti | 6^{5} | 6 | [10]

Final
(Slovakia) L Klein (Slovakia) A Molčan | 1 | 7 | [10]
(France) A Hoang (France) A Olivetti | 6 | 5 | [6]
