= 2026 Upper Austria Open – Doubles =

Doubles
- 2026 Upper Austria Open

Final
- Champions: Ivan Liutarevich (Poland) Filip Pieczonka
- Runners-up: (Spain) Àlex Martínez (Spain) Bruno Pujol Navarro
- Score: 6–3, 3–6, [12–10]

Events
| Singles | Doubles |
- Upper Austria Open

Nico Hipfl and Jérôme Kym were the defending champions but only Hipfl chose to defend his title, partnering Michael Vrbenský. They lost in the quarterfinals to Ivan Liutarevich and Filip Pieczonka.

Liutarevich and Pieczonka won the title after defeating Àlex Martínez and Bruno Pujol Navarro 6–3, 3–6, [12–10] in the final.

== Seeds ==
1. Ivan Liutarevich / (Poland) Filip Pieczonka (champions)
2. (Israel) Daniel Cukierman / (United States) Trey Hilderbrand (first round)
3. (Serbia) Stefan Latinović / (Germany) Tim Rühl (first round)
4. (Poland) Szymon Kielan / (Czech Republic) Andrew Paulson (semifinals)

== Draw ==
Key

- Q = Qualifier
- WC = Wild card
- LL = Lucky loser
- Alt = Alternate
- ITF = ITF entry
- PR = Protected ranking
- SR = Special ranking
- SE = Special exempt
- JE = Junior exempt
- JR = Junior Accelerator Programme entrant
- CO = College Accelerator Programme entrant
- NG = Next Gen Accelerator Program entrant
- w/o = Walkover
- r = Retired
- d = Defaulted

First round
1 | I Liutarevich (Poland) F Pieczonka | 6 | 6
(Italy) Simone Agostini (Serbia) Dušan Obradović | 3 | 0
(Austria) N Hipfl (Czech Republic) M Vrbenský | 6 | 3 | [10]
(United States) Zachary Fuchs (United Kingdom) James Hopper | 3 | 6 | [8]
3 | (Serbia) S Latinović (Germany) T Rühl | 3 | 6 | [5]
(Romania) A Jecan (Romania) B Pavel | 6 | 2 | [10]
WC | (Austria) S Kopp (Austria) L Neumayer | 4 | 7^{7} | [23]
(United Kingdom) B Harris (Spain) D Vega Hernández | 6 | 6^{5} | [21]
(Chile) T Barrios Vera (Colombia) N Mejía | 3 | 5
(Spain) M Damas (Spain) D Jordà Sanchis | 6 | 7
(United States) N Lammons (United States) J Withrow | 4 | 6 | [5]
4 | (Poland) S Kielan (Czech Republic) A Paulson | 6 | 3 | [10]
(Sweden) E Grevelius (Ukraine) D Molchanov | 3 | 3
(Spain) Àlex Martínez (Spain) B Pujol Navarro | 6 | 6
WC | (Germany) P Kohlschreiber (Austria) J Schwärzler | 4 | 7^{7} | [10]
2 | (Israel) D Cukierman (United States) T Hilderbrand | 6 | 6^{4} | [8]

Quarterfinals
1 | I Liutarevich (Poland) F Pieczonka | 7^{9} | 4 | [10]
(Austria) N Hipfl (Czech Republic) M Vrbenský | 6^{7} | 6 | [6]
(Romania) A Jecan (Romania) B Pavel | 6 | 7^{7}
WC | (Austria) S Kopp (Austria) L Neumayer | 4 | 6^{2}
(Spain) M Damas (Spain) D Jordà Sanchis | 0 | 2
4 | (Poland) S Kielan (Czech Republic) A Paulson | 6 | 6
(Spain) À Martínez (Spain) B Pujol Navarro | 6 | 6^{5} | [10]
WC | (Germany) P Kohlschreiber (Austria) J Schwärzler | 2 | 7^{7} | [8]

Semifinals
1 | I Liutarevich (Poland) F Pieczonka | 6 | 6
(Romania) A Jecan (Romania) B Pavel | 2 | 2
4 | (Poland) S Kielan (Czech Republic) A Paulson | 6^{3} | 6 | [8]
(Spain) À Martínez (Spain) B Pujol Navarro | 7^{7} | 4 | [10]

Final
1 | I Liutarevich (Poland) F Pieczonka | 6 | 3 | [12]
(Spain) À Martínez (Spain) B Pujol Navarro | 3 | 6 | [10]
