= 2021 Challenger La Manche =

- Date: 8–14 February
- Edition: 28th
- Draw: 32S / 16D
- Surface: Hard (Indoor)
- Location: Cherbourg, France

Champions

Singles
- (Belgium) Ruben Bemelmans

Doubles
- (Slovakia) Lukáš Klein / (Slovakia) Alex Molčan
← 2020 ·	Challenger La Manche	· 2022 →

The 2021 Challenger La Manche was a professional tennis tournament played on indoor hard courts. It was the 28th edition of the tournament which was part of the 2021 ATP Challenger Tour. It took place in Cherbourg, France between 8 and 14 February 2021.

== Singles main-draw entrants ==
=== Seeds ===
Country	Player	Rank^{1}	Seed
USA	Denis Kudla	116	1
FRA	Antoine Hoang	119	2
FRA	Arthur Rinderknech	135	3
AUT	Jurij Rodionov	148	4
GER	Peter Gojowczyk	151	5
ESP	Bernabé Zapata Miralles	153	6
~~USA~~	~~Brandon Nakashima~~	~~157~~	~~7~~
AUT	Sebastian Ofner	162	8

- ^{1} Rankings are as of 1 February 2021.

=== Other entrants ===
The following players received wildcards into the singles main draw:

- (France) Kenny de Schepper
- (France) Evan Furness
- (France) Matteo Martineau

The following players received entry into the singles main draw as alternates:

- (Slovakia) Lukáš Klein
- (Slovakia) Alex Molčan
- (Croatia) Nino Serdarušić

The following players received entry from the qualifying draw:

- (France) Titouan Droguet
- (Czech Republic) Jonáš Forejtek
- (Belgium) Michael Geerts
- (United States) Nathaniel Lammons

The following player received entry as a lucky loser:

- (France) Corentin Denolly

== Champions ==
=== Singles ===
- (Belgium) Ruben Bemelmans def. (Czech Republic) Lukáš Rosol 6–4, 6–4.

=== Doubles ===
- (Slovakia) Lukáš Klein / (Slovakia) Alex Molčan def. (France) Antoine Hoang / (France) Albano Olivetti 1–6, 7–5, [10–6].
