= 2026 Upper Austria Open =

- Date: 27 April – 3 May
- Edition: 5th
- Surface: Clay
- Location: Mauthausen, Austria

Champions

Singles
- Roman Safiullin

Doubles
- Ivan Liutarevich / (Poland) Filip Pieczonka
- Upper Austria Open

The 2026 Danube Upper Austria Open powered by SKE was a professional tennis tournament played on clay courts. It was the fifth edition of the tournament which was part of the 2026 ATP Challenger Tour. It took place in Mauthausen, Austria between 27 April and 3 May 2026.

== Singles main-draw entrants ==
=== Seeds ===
| Country | Player | Rank^{1} | Seed |
|---|---|---|---|
| ITA | Francesco Maestrelli | 112 | 1 |
| FRA | Titouan Droguet | 113 | 2 |
| FRA | Hugo Gaston | 115 | 3 |
| GBR | Jan Choinski | 119 | 4 |
| GEO | Nikoloz Basilashvili | 120 | 5 |
| CHI | Tomás Barrios Vera | 123 | 6 |
| POR | Jaime Faria | 136 | 7 |
| COL | Nicolás Mejía | 152 | 8 |

- ^{1} Rankings as of 20 April 2026.

=== Other entrants ===
The following players received wildcards into the singles main draw:

- (Austria) Sandro Kopp
- (Austria) Sebastian Sorger
- (Austria) Matthias Ujvary

The following players received entry into the singles main draw as special exempts:

- (United States) ~~Nishesh Basavareddy~~
- (Italy) Andrea Guerrieri

The following players received entry into the singles main draw through the Next Gen Accelerator programme:

- (United States) Darwin Blanch
- (Germany) Justin Engel

The following players received entry into the singles main draw as alternates:

- (Germany) Diego Dedura
- (Germany) Marko Topo

The following players received entry from the qualifying draw:

- (Switzerland) Mika Brunold
- (Romania) Cezar Crețu
- (Israel) Daniel Cukierman
- (Czech Republic) Matthew William Donald
- (Spain) David Jordà Sanchis
- (Czech Republic) Martin Krumich

The following player received entry as a lucky loser:

- (Spain) Miguel Damas

== Champions ==
=== Singles ===
- Roman Safiullin def. (Portugal) Jaime Faria 4–6, 6–4, 7–6^{(7–4)}.

=== Doubles ===
- Ivan Liutarevich / (Poland) Filip Pieczonka def. (Spain) Àlex Martínez / (Spain) Bruno Pujol Navarro 6–3, 3–6, [12–10].
