= 2025 Chicago Men's Challenger =

- Date: 4–10 August
- Edition: 4th
- Surface: Hard
- Location: Chicago, United States

Champions

Singles
- (United States) Michael Zheng

Doubles
- (United States) Mac Kiger / (United States) Ryan Seggerman
- Chicago Men's Challenger

The 2025 Chicago Tennis Challenger was a professional tennis tournament played on hardcourts. It was the fourth edition of the tournament which was part of the 2025 ATP Challenger Tour. It took place in Chicago, United States between August 4 and 10, 2025.

== Singles main draw entrants ==
=== Seeds ===
Country	Player	Rank^{1}	Seed
DEN	August Holmgren	144	1
GBR	Billy Harris	146	2
LBN	Hady Habib	169	3
CHN	Wu Yibing	186	4
KAZ	Beibit Zhukayev	203	5
AUS	Bernard Tomic	211	6
TPE	Hsu Yu-hsiou	217	7
MEX	Rodrigo Pacheco Méndez	220	8

- ^{1} Rankings as of 28 July 2025.

=== Other entrants ===
The following players received wildcards into the singles main draw:

- (United States) Martin Damm
- (United States) Kyle Kang
- (Barbados) Darian King

The following player received entry into the singles main draw using a protected ranking:

- (Chinese Taipei) Jason Jung

The following player received entry into the singles main draw through the College Accelerator programme:

- (United States) Michael Zheng

The following player received entry into the singles main draw through the Junior Accelerator programme:

- (Colombia) Miguel Tobón

The following players received entry into the singles main draw as alternates:

- (United States) Stefan Dostanic
- (United States) Andre Ilagan
- (United States) Garrett Johns
- (United States) Alfredo Perez

The following players received entry from the qualifying draw:

- (United States) Samir Banerjee
- (United States) Andrew Fenty
- (France) Antoine Ghibaudo
- (Chinese Taipei) Huang Tsung-hao
- (United States) Joshua Sheehy
- (United States) Trevor Svajda

The following player received entry as a lucky loser:

- (United Kingdom) Giles Hussey

== Champions ==
=== Singles ===
- (United States) Michael Zheng def. (Chinese Taipei) Hsu Yu-hsiou 6–4, 6–2.

=== Doubles ===
- (United States) Mac Kiger / (United States) Ryan Seggerman def. (United States) Theodore Winegar / (United States) Michael Zheng 6–4, 3–6, [10–5].
