= 2026 Upper Austria Open – Singles =

Singles
- 2026 Upper Austria Open

Final
- Champion: Roman Safiullin
- Runner-up: (Portugal) Jaime Faria
- Score: 4–6, 6–4, 7–6^{(7–4)}

Events
| Singles | Doubles |
- Upper Austria Open

Cristian Garín was the defending champion but chose not to defend his title.

Roman Safiullin won the title after defeating Jaime Faria 4–6, 6–4, 7–6^{(7–4)} in the final.

== Seeds ==
1. (Italy) Francesco Maestrelli (first round)
2. (France) Titouan Droguet (second round)
3. (France) Hugo Gaston (second round)
4. (United Kingdom) Jan Choinski (second round)
5. (Georgia (country)) Nikoloz Basilashvili (first round)
6. (Chile) Tomás Barrios Vera (second round)
7. (Portugal) Jaime Faria (final)
8. (Colombia) Nicolás Mejía (first round)

== Draw ==
Key

- Q = Qualifier
- WC = Wild card
- LL = Lucky loser
- Alt = Alternate
- ITF = ITF entry
- PR = Protected ranking
- SR = Special ranking
- SE = Special exempt
- JE = Junior exempt
- JR = Junior Accelerator Programme entrant
- CO = College Accelerator Programme entrant
- NG = Next Gen Accelerator Program entrant
- w/o = Walkover
- r = Retired
- d = Defaulted

=== Finals ===
Semifinals
7 | (Portugal) Jaime Faria | 6 | 6
NG | (United States) Darwin Blanch | 3 | 2
(Austria) Lukas Neumayer | 3 | 6 | 2
Roman Safiullin | 6 | 3 | 6

Final
7 | (Portugal) Jaime Faria | 6 | 4 | 6^{4}
Roman Safiullin | 4 | 6 | 7^{7}

=== Top half ===
First round
1 | (Italy) F Maestrelli | 6^{2} | 4
LL | (Spain) M Damas | 7^{7} | 6
Q | (Switzerland) M Brunold | 6 | 4 | 6
(Argentina) A Barrena | 3 | 6 | 3
Alt | (Germany) M Topo | 5 | 7^{9} | 2
Q | (Czech Republic) M Krumich | 7 | 6^{7} | 6
SE | (Italy) A Guerrieri | 3 | 7^{7} | 4
7 | (Portugal) J Faria | 6 | 6^{2} | 6
3 | (France) H Gaston | 6 | 6
WC | (Austria) Matthias Ujvary | 0 | 1
(Austria) J Rodionov | 6 | 1 | 6^{6}
NG | (United States) Dar Blanch | 1 | 6 | 7^{8}
Alt | (Germany) D Dedura | 6^{0} | 6 | 6
(United Kingdom) B Harris | 7^{7} | 2 | 3
Q | (Czech Republic) Matthew William Donald | 6 | 6
8 | (Colombia) N Mejía | 4 | 1

Second round
LL | (Spain) M Damas | 6 | 6
Q | (Switzerland) M Brunold | 3 | 1
Q | (Czech Republic) M Krumich | 6 | 3 | 4
7 | (Portugal) J Faria | 2 | 6 | 6
3 | (France) H Gaston | 6 | 3 | 0
NG | (United States) Dar Blanch | 3 | 6 | 6
Alt | (Germany) D Dedura | 6 | 5 | 3
Q | (Czech Republic) MW Donald | 3 | 7 | 6

Quarterfinals
LL | (Spain) M Damas | 1 | 0
7 | (Portugal) J Faria | 6 | 6
NG | (United States) Dar Blanch | 6 | 6
Q | (Czech Republic) MW Donald | 3 | 4

Semifinals
7 | (Portugal) J Faria | 6 | 6
NG | (United States) Dar Blanch | 3 | 2

=== Bottom half ===
First round
6 | (Chile) T Barrios Vera | 6 | 2 | 6
WC | (Austria) Sebastian Sorger | 1 | 6 | 4
(Austria) L Neumayer | 6 | 7
(Chinese Taipei) C-h Tseng | 1 | 5
NG | (Germany) J Engel | 3 | 3
(Serbia) L Djere | 6 | 6
(Austria) J Schwärzler | 4 | 6 | 4
4 | (United Kingdom) J Choinski | 6 | 4 | 6
5 | (Georgia (country)) N Basilashvili | 3 | 4
WC | (Austria) S Kopp | 6 | 6
Q | (Spain) D Jordà Sanchis | 6 | 6
Q | (Israel) D Cukierman | 4 | 2
R Safiullin | 6 | 6
Q | (Romania) C Crețu | 2 | 4
(Kazakhstan) T Skatov | 2 | 1
2 | (France) T Droguet | 6 | 6

Second round
6 | (Chile) T Barrios Vera | 6^{4} | 4
(Austria) L Neumayer | 7^{7} | 6
(Serbia) L Djere | 7^{7} | 7^{8}
4 | (United Kingdom) J Choinski | 6^{2} | 6^{6}
WC | (Austria) S Kopp | 3 | 3
Q | (Spain) D Jordà Sanchis | 6 | 6
R Safiullin | 6 | 4 | 6
2 | (France) T Droguet | 2 | 6 | 4

Quarterfinals
(Austria) L Neumayer | 7^{7} | 6
(Serbia) L Djere | 6^{4} | 3
Q | (Spain) D Jordà Sanchis | 3 | 6 | 1
R Safiullin | 6 | 3 | 6

Semifinals
(Austria) L Neumayer | 3 | 6 | 2
R Safiullin | 6 | 3 | 6
