= 2025 Chicago Men's Challenger – Singles =

Singles
- 2025 Chicago Men's Challenger

Final
- Champion: (United States) Michael Zheng
- Runner-up: (Chinese Taipei) Hsu Yu-hsiou
- Score: 6–4, 6–2

Events
| Singles | Doubles |
- Chicago Men's Challenger

Gabriel Diallo was the defending champion but chose not to defend his title.

Michael Zheng won the title after defeating Hsu Yu-hsiou 6–4, 6–2 in the final.

== Seeds ==
1. (Denmark) August Holmgren (semifinals)
2. (United Kingdom) Billy Harris (first round)
3. (Lebanon) Hady Habib (quarterfinals)
4. (China) Wu Yibing (quarterfinals)
5. (Kazakhstan) Beibit Zhukayev (second round)
6. (Australia) Bernard Tomic (first round, retired)
7. (Chinese Taipei) Hsu Yu-hsiou (final)
8. (Mexico) Rodrigo Pacheco Méndez (first round)

== Draw ==
Key

- Q = Qualifier
- WC = Wild card
- LL = Lucky loser
- Alt = Alternate
- ITF = ITF entry
- PR = Protected ranking
- SR = Special ranking
- SE = Special exempt
- JE = Junior exempt
- JR = Junior Accelerator Programme entrant
- CO = College Accelerator Programme entrant
- NG = Next Gen Accelerator Program entrant
- w/o = Walkover
- r = Retired
- d = Defaulted

=== Finals ===
Semifinals
1 | (Denmark) August Holmgren | 6^{2} | 6 | 6^{3}
7 | (Chinese Taipei) Hsu Yu-hsiou | 7^{7} | 3 | 7^{7}
CO | (United States) Michael Zheng | 2 | 6 | 6
Alt | (United States) Garrett Johns | 6 | 4 | 1

Final
7 | (Chinese Taipei) Hsu Yu-hsiou | 4 | 2
CO | (United States) Michael Zheng | 6 | 6

=== Top half ===
First round
1 | (Denmark) A Holmgren | 6 | 6
WC | (Barbados) D King | 4 | 4
Q | (France) A Ghibaudo | 6 | 6
(Paraguay) AD Vallejo | 0 | 2
LL | (United Kingdom) G Hussey | 7^{7} | 7
WC | (United States) M Damm | 6^{2} | 5
Alt | (United States) S Dostanic | 6^{3} | 7^{7} | 2
6 | (Australia) B Tomic | 7^{7} | 6^{4} | 0^{r}
4 | (China) Y Wu | 1 | 6 | 6
Alt | (United States) Andre Ilagan | 6 | 2 | 1
(Japan) N Nakagawa | 6 | 6
Alt | (United States) A Perez | 4 | 3
JR | (Colombia) Miguel Tobón | 4 | 3
(Brazil) K Sell | 6 | 6
Q | (United States) A Fenty | 2 | 2
7 | (Chinese Taipei) Y-h Hsu | 6 | 6

Second round
1 | (Denmark) A Holmgren | 6 | 6
Q | (France) A Ghibaudo | 4 | 4
LL | (United Kingdom) G Hussey | 4 | 7 | 4
Alt | (United States) S Dostanic | 6 | 5 | 2^{r}
4 | (China) Y Wu | 6 | 6
(Japan) N Nakagawa | 3 | 2
(Brazil) K Sell | 3 | 2
7 | (Chinese Taipei) Y-h Hsu | 6 | 6

Quarterfinals
1 | (Denmark) A Holmgren | 6 | 6
LL | (United Kingdom) G Hussey | 4 | 4
4 | (China) Y Wu | 6^{4} | 4
7 | (Chinese Taipei) Y-h Hsu | 7^{7} | 6

Semifinals
1 | (Denmark) A Holmgren | 6^{2} | 6 | 6^{3}
7 | (Chinese Taipei) Y-h Hsu | 7^{7} | 3 | 7^{7}

=== Bottom half ===
First round
8 | (Mexico) R Pacheco Méndez | 6^{7} | 2
CO | (United States) M Zheng | 7^{9} | 6
(China) Y Zhou | 6 | 6
Q | (United States) J Sheehy | 3 | 2
Q | (United States) S Banerjee | 6 | 6
(United States) A Rybakov | 2 | 3
WC | (United States) Kyle Kang | 6^{7} | 3
3 | (Lebanon) H Habib | 7^{9} | 6
5 | (Kazakhstan) B Zhukayev | 4 | 6 | 6
(United States) Patrick Maloney | 6 | 3 | 4
PR | (Chinese Taipei) J Jung | 3 | 6^{7}
Q | (United States) T Svajda | 6 | 7^{9}
(Australia) A Bolt | 6 | 7^{9}
Q | (Chinese Taipei) T-h Huang | 1 | 6^{7}
Alt | (United States) G Johns | 3 | 6 | 6
2 | (United Kingdom) B Harris | 6 | 3 | 4

Second round
CO | (United States) M Zheng | 6 | 3 | 7^{7}
(China) Y Zhou | 4 | 6 | 6^{5}
Q | (United States) S Banerjee | 5 | 4
3 | (Lebanon) H Habib | 7 | 6
5 | (Kazakhstan) B Zhukayev | 3 | 0
Q | (United States) T Svajda | 6 | 6
(Australia) A Bolt | 2 | 6 | 5
Alt | (United States) G Johns | 6 | 2 | 7

Quarterfinals
CO | (United States) M Zheng | 6 | 6
3 | (Lebanon) H Habib | 4 | 3
Q | (United States) T Svajda | 5 | 2
Alt | (United States) G Johns | 7 | 6

Semifinals
CO | (United States) M Zheng | 2 | 6 | 6
Alt | (United States) G Johns | 6 | 4 | 1
