= 2022 Chicago Men's Challenger =

- Date: 8–14 August
- Edition: 1st
- Surface: Hard
- Location: Chicago, United States

Champions

Singles
- Roman Safiullin

Doubles
- (Sweden) André Göransson / (Japan) Ben McLachlan
Chicago Men's Challenger	· 2023 →

The 2022 Chicago Men's Challenger was a professional tennis tournament played on hardcourts. It was the first edition of the tournament which was part of the 2022 ATP Challenger Tour. It took place in Chicago, United States between August 8 and August 14, 2022.

== Singles main draw entrants ==
=== Seeds ===
Country	Player	Rank^{1}	Seed
SUI	Henri Laaksonen	103	1
AUS	Christopher O'Connell	109	2
USA	Stefan Kozlov	111	3
AUS	Jordan Thompson	114	4
MDA	Radu Albot	118	5
~~ECU~~	~~Emilio Gómez~~	~~121~~	~~6~~
	Roman Safiullin	124	7
~~ESP~~	~~Fernando Verdasco~~	~~125~~	~~8~~

- ^{1} Rankings as of 1 August 2022.

=== Other entrants ===
The following players received wildcards into the singles main draw:

- (United States) Aleksandar Kovacevic
- (United States) Govind Nanda
- (United States) Ben Shelton

The following player received entry into the singles main draw using a protected ranking:

- (United States) ~~Bradley Klahn~~

The following players received entry into the singles main draw as alternates:

- (Kazakhstan) Mikhail Kukushkin
- (Argentina) Genaro Alberto Olivieri

The following players received entry from the qualifying draw:

- (France) Enzo Couacaud
- (United Kingdom) Billy Harris
- (United States) Ryan Harrison
- (United States) Brandon Holt
- (United Kingdom) Aidan McHugh
- (United States) Keegan Smith

The following players received entry as lucky losers:

- (United States) Zachary Svajda
- (Australia) Li Tu
- (United States) Evan Zhu

== Champions ==
=== Singles ===
- Roman Safiullin def. (United States) Ben Shelton 6–3, 4–6, 7–5.

=== Doubles ===
- (Sweden) André Göransson / (Japan) Ben McLachlan def. (United States) Evan King / (United States) Mitchell Krueger 6–4, 6–7^{(3–7)}, [10–5].
