= 2021 Challenger La Manche – Singles =

Singles
- 2021 Challenger La Manche

Final
- Champion: (Belgium) Ruben Bemelmans
- Runner-up: (Czech Republic) Lukáš Rosol
- Score: 6–4, 6–4

Events
Singles	Doubles
- Challenger La Manche

Roman Safiullin was the defending champion of the 2021 Challenger La Manche singles event, but chose not to defend his title.

Ruben Bemelmans won the title after defeating Lukáš Rosol 6–4, 6–4 in the final.

== Seeds ==
1. (United States) Denis Kudla (second round)
2. (France) Antoine Hoang (second round)
3. (France) Arthur Rinderknech (semifinals)
4. (Austria) Jurij Rodionov (second round)
5. (Germany) Peter Gojowczyk (second round)
6. (Spain) Bernabé Zapata Miralles (first round)
7. (United States) Brandon Nakashima (withdrew)
8. (Austria) Sebastian Ofner (second round)

== Draw ==
Key

- Q = Qualifier
- WC = Wild card
- LL = Lucky loser
- Alt = Alternate
- ITF = ITF entry
- PR = Protected ranking
- SR = Special ranking
- SE = Special exempt
- JE = Junior exempt
- JR = Junior Accelerator Programme entrant
- CO = College Accelerator Programme entrant
- NG = Next Gen Accelerator Program entrant
- w/o = Walkover
- r = Retired
- d = Defaulted

=== Finals ===
Semifinals
(Belgium) Ruben Bemelmans	6	3	7
3	(France) Arthur Rinderknech	3	6	5
(France) Hugo Gaston	5	6	3
(Czech Republic) Lukáš Rosol	7	2	6

Final
(Belgium) Ruben Bemelmans	6	6
(Czech Republic) Lukáš Rosol	4	4

=== Top half ===
First round
1	(United States) D Kudla	6	6
Alt	(Croatia) N Serdarušić	3	1
Q	(Belgium) M Geerts	6^{2}	6	6
Q	(Czech Republic) J Forejtek	7^{7}	4	2
(Belgium) R Bemelmans	3	6	6
LL	(France) C Denolly	6	1	4
(Uzbekistan) D Istomin	6	5	6
Q	(United States) N Lammons	3	7	4
3	(France) A Rinderknech	4	6	6
(Russia) A Vatutin	6	0	3
(Netherlands) I Sijsling	2	4
WC	(France) E Furness	6	6
(France) C Lestienne	1	6	6
Q	(France) T Droguet	6	1	2
WC	(France) M Martineau	7^{14}	6
6	(Spain) B Zapata Miralles	6^{12}	3

Second round
1	(United States) D Kudla	1	7^{7}	3
Q	(Belgium) M Geerts	6	6^{5}	6
(Belgium) R Bemelmans	6	7^{7}
(Uzbekistan) D Istomin	4	6^{4}
3	(France) A Rinderknech	7^{7}	6
WC	(France) E Furness	6^{5}	3
(France) C Lestienne	6	6
WC	(France) M Martineau	3	4

Quarterfinals
Q	(Belgium) M Geerts	6	1	6^{4}
(Belgium) R Bemelmans	4	6	7^{7}
3	(France) A Rinderknech	7^{7}	7^{7}
(France) C Lestienne	6^{4}	6^{3}

Semifinals
(Belgium) R Bemelmans	6	3	7
3	(France) A Rinderknech	3	6	5

=== Bottom half ===
First round
5	(Germany) P Gojowczyk	6	6
(Chinese Taipei) T-l Wu	2	4
(Germany) J Lenz	1	6	3
(France) H Gaston	6	3	6
(Portugal) G Oliveira	1	4
Alt	(Slovakia) L Klein	6	6
WC	(France) K de Schepper	5	6	3
4	(Austria) J Rodionov	7	3	6
8	(Austria) S Ofner	6	6
(Germany) Y Maden	1	3
(France) M Janvier	6^{4}	0^{r}
(Poland) K Żuk	7^{7}	1
(Czech Republic) L Rosol	1	6	7^{8}
Alt	(Slovakia) A Molčan	6	3	6^{6}
(Argentina) M Trungelliti	1	0
2	(France) A Hoang	6	6

Second round
5	(Germany) P Gojowczyk	6	3	2
(France) H Gaston	4	6	6
Alt	(Slovakia) L Klein	4	6	6
4	(Austria) J Rodionov	6	1	3
8	(Austria) S Ofner	3	2
(Poland) K Żuk	6	6
(Czech Republic) L Rosol	6	5	7
2	(France) A Hoang	3	7	5

Quarterfinals
(France) H Gaston	6	6
Alt	(Slovakia) L Klein	0	3
(Poland) K Żuk	6^{2}	6	6^{2}
(Czech Republic) L Rosol	7^{7}	4	7^{7}

Semifinals
(France) H Gaston	5	6	3
(Czech Republic) L Rosol	7	2	6
