= Roberto Marcora =

Italian tennis player

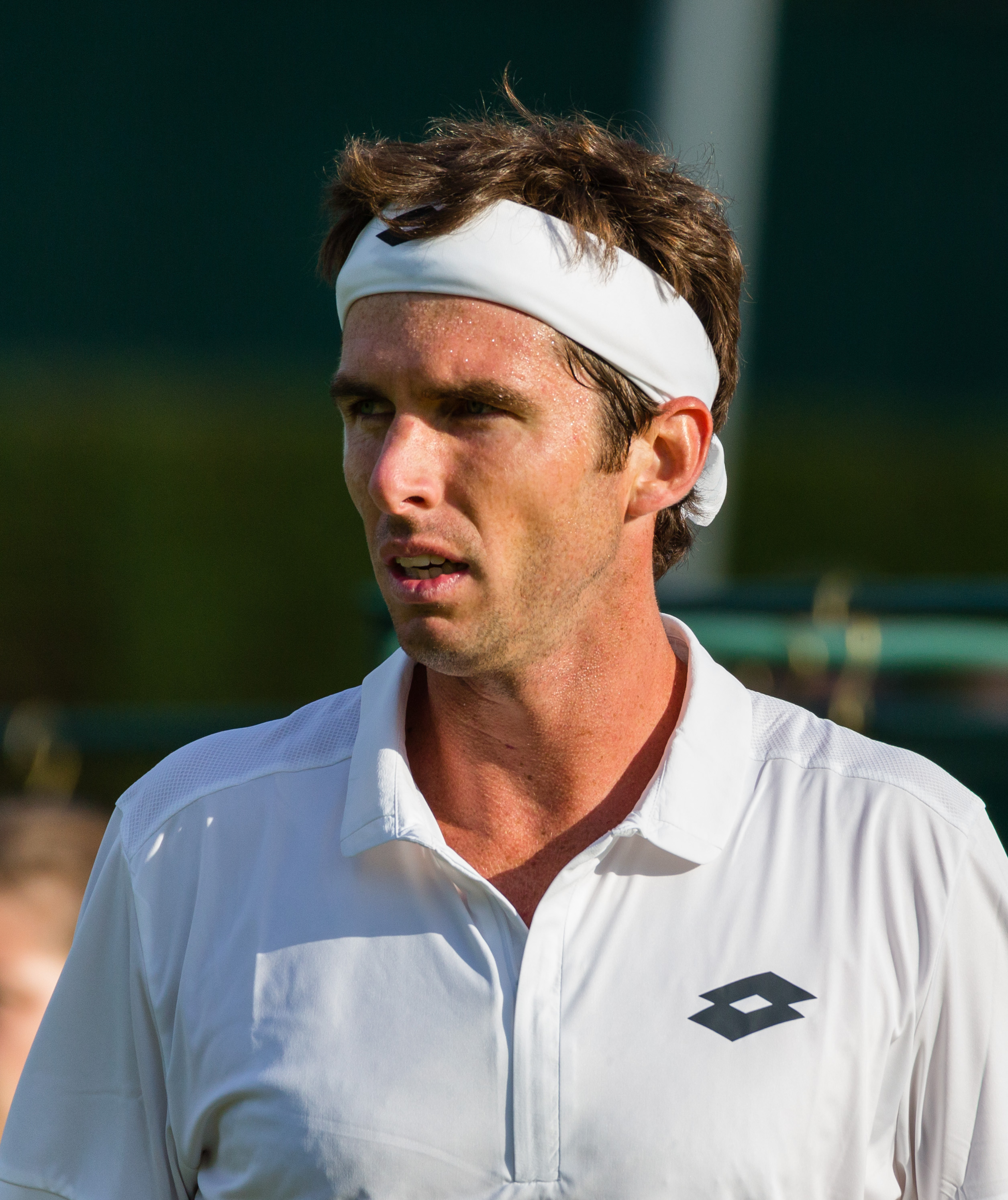
- Country (sports): Italy
- Residence: Busto Arsizio, Italy
- Born: 30 August 1989 (age 36) Busto Arsizio, Italy
- Height: 1.94 m (6 ft 4 in)
- Turned pro: 2009
- Retired: 2023
- Plays: Right-handed (one-handed backhand)
- Prize money: $574,074

Singles
- Career record: 3–4 (at ATP Tour level, Grand Slam level, and in Davis Cup)
- Career titles: 0
- Highest ranking: No. 150 (17 February 2020)

Grand Slam singles results
- Australian Open: Q2 (2020)
- French Open: Q3 (2020)
- Wimbledon: Q2 (2021)
- US Open: Q2 (2021, 2022)

Doubles
- Career record: 0–0 (at ATP Tour level, Grand Slam level, and in Davis Cup)
- Career titles: 0
- Highest ranking: No. 717 (8 July 2013)

Roberto Marcora (Italian pronunciation: [roˈbɛrto marˈkɔːra]; born 30 August 1989) is an Italian former tennis player.

Marcora has a career high ATP singles ranking of No. 150, achieved on 17 February 2020 and a career high ATP doubles ranking of No. 717, achieved on 8 July 2013.

== Career ==
Marcora made his ATP main draw debut at the 2017 Geneva Open as a qualifier, defeating Pere Riba and Marco Chiudinelli in qualifying. He was defeated by Mikhail Kukushkin in the first round.

At 2020 Maharashtra Open, he qualified for the main draw, where he earned his first ATP tour-level win. In the second round, he upset top seed Benoit Paire to enter his first quarterfinal at an ATP tour event. He was defeated by Australian player James Duckworth.

Although Marcora announced his retirement from professional tennis in February 2022, he changed his mind and returned four months later at the qualifying competition for the 2022 Wimbledon Championships. Marcora eventually retired again in March 2023, making his final professional appearance at the 2023 BNP Paribas Open.

== Challenger and Futures finals ==
=== Singles: 23 (11–12) ===
Legend (singles) ATP Challenger Tour (0–5) ITF Futures Tour (11–7)	Titles by surface Hard (4–7) Clay (7–5) Grass (0–0) Carpet (0–0)

Result	W–L	Date	Tournament	Tier	Surface	Opponent	Score
Loss	0–1	Mar 2012	United Arab Emirates F1, Fujairah	Futures	Hard	(France) Jules Marie	2–6, 6–2, 3–6
Loss	0–2	Jun 2012	Slovenia F3, Litija	Futures	Clay	(Italy) Riccardo Bellotti	1–6, 3–6
Loss	0–3	Jul 2012	Romania F6, Pitești	Futures	Clay	(Romania) Petru-Alexandru Luncanu	1–6, 6–1, 6–7^{(3–7)}
Win	1–3	Sep 2012	Spain F29, Madrid	Futures	Hard	(Spain) Andrés Artuñedo Martínavarro	6–3, 7–6^{(7–3)}
Win	2–3	May 2013	Sweden F2, Båstad	Futures	Clay	(Italy) Simone Vagnozzi	6–3, 7–5
Win	3–3	Jun 2013	Italy F14, Siena	Futures	Clay	(Italy) Edoardo Eremin	7–2, 4–6, 6–3
Loss	3–4	Aug 2013	Switzerland F5, Sion	Futures	Clay	(Germany) Richard Becker	7–6^{(7–5)}, 6–7^{(1–7)}, 2–6
Win	4–4	Oct 2013	Israel F14, Ramat HaSharon	Futures	Hard	(Slovakia) Ivo Klec	7–6^{(7–4)}, 6–4
Win	5–4	Apr 2014	Italy F11, Santa Margherita di Pula	Futures	Clay	(Italy) Riccardo Sinicropi	6–1, 3–6, 6–2
Win	6–4	May 2014	Italy F14, Santa Margherita di Pula	Futures	Clay	(Italy) Gianluca Naso	7–5, 6–4
Win	7–4	May 2014	Italy F15, Bergamo	Futures	Clay	(Italy) Claudio Fortuna	5–7, 6–0, 6–1
Loss	7–5	Jun 2014	Italy F20, Busto Arsizio	Futures	Clay	(Italy) Stefano Travaglia	2–6, 6–4, 4–6
Loss	7–6	Mar 2015	Guangzhou, China, P.R.	Challenger	Hard	(Belgium) Kimmer Coppejans	6–7^{(6–8)}, 7–5, 1–6
Win	8–6	Aug 2015	Switzerland F3, Geneva	Futures	Clay	(Serbia) Nikola Milojević	6–4, 6–2
Win	9–6	Sep 2015	Switzerland F5, Lausanne	Futures	Clay	(Switzerland) Cristian Villagrán	7–6^{(7–5)}, 6–7^{(2–7)}, 6–4
Win	10–6	Oct 2015	Israel F14, Ramat HaSharon	Futures	Hard	(Belgium) Julien Dubail	7–5, 3–6, 7–6^{(7–4)}
Loss	10–7	Jun 2016	Romania F5, Arad	Futures	Clay	(Romania) Petru-Alexandru Luncanu	3–6, 6–4, 4–6
Loss	10–8	Feb 2018	Tunisia F5, Jerba	Futures	Hard	(Spain) Carlos Boluda-Purkiss	6–3, 6–7^{(1–7)}, 5–7
Win	11–8	Mar 2018	Israel F3, Tel Aviv	Futures	Hard	(Belgium) Yannick Vandenbulcke	6–3, 2–6, 6–4
Loss	11–9	Feb 2019	Budapest, Hungary	Challenger	Hard (i)	(Kazakhstan) Alexander Bublik	0–6, 3–6
Loss	11–10	Feb 2019	Bergamo, Italy	Challenger	Hard (i)	(Italy) Jannik Sinner	3–6, 1–6
Loss	11–11	July 2019	Recanati, Italy	Challenger	Hard	(Belarus) Egor Gerasimov	2–6, 5–7
Loss	11–11	Feb 2020	Cherbourg, France	Challenger	Hard	(Russia) Roman Safiullin	4–6, 2-6

=== Doubles: 4 (1–3) ===
Legend (doubles) ATP Challenger Tour (0–0) ITF Futures Tour (1–3)	Titles by surface Hard (1–2) Clay (0–1) Grass (0–0) Carpet (0–0)

Result	W–L	Date	Tournament	Tier	Surface	Partner	Opponents	Score
Loss	0–1	Jul 2012	Romania F5, Bucharest	Futures	Clay	(Switzerland) Riccardo Maiga	(Greece) Theodoros Angelinos (Greece) Paris Gemouchidis	7–5, 6–7^{(1–7)}, [3–10]
Loss	0–2	Nov 2012	Mexico F12, Cancún	Futures	Hard	(Switzerland) Riccardo Maiga	(New Zealand) Marvin Barker (Guatemala) Christopher Díaz Figueroa	4–6, 2–6
Win	1–2	Nov 2012	Mexico F13, Mérida	Futures	Hard	(Switzerland) Riccardo Maiga	(Guatemala) Christopher Díaz Figueroa (Dominican Republic) José Hernández-Fernández	6–1, 2–6, [10–7]
Loss	1–3	Jan 2018	Egypt F1, Sharm El Sheikh	Futures	Hard	(Ukraine) Artem Smirnov	(Netherlands) Thiemo de Bakker (Belgium) Yannick Mertens	5–7, 2–6
