= Mac Kiger =

American tennis player (born 1998)

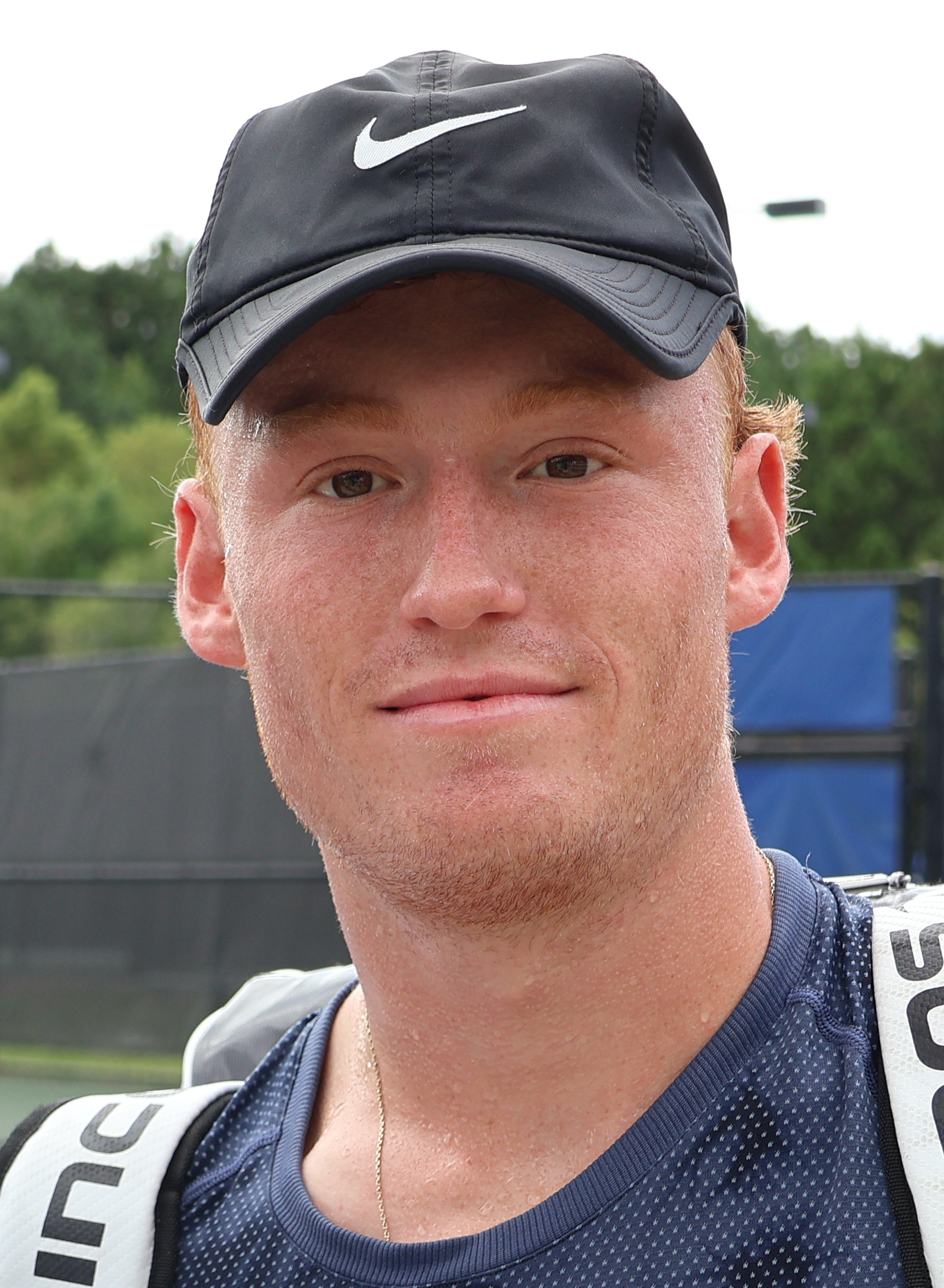
- Country (sports): United States
- Born: 19 December 1998 (age 27) Katonah, New York, United States
- Height: 6 ft 1 in (1.85 m)
- Plays: Right-handed (two-handed backhand)
- College: North Carolina
- Coach: Randy Bloemendaal, Tripp Phillips
- Prize money: US $173,709

Singles
- Career record: 0–0
- Career titles: 0
- Highest ranking: No. 918 (February 27, 2023)

Doubles
- Career record: 2–8
- Career titles: 0; 8 Challenger
- Highest ranking: No. 70 (September 14, 2026)
- Current ranking: No. 70 (September 14, 2026)

Grand Slam doubles results
- French Open: 1R (2026)
- Wimbledon: 2R (2026)
- US Open: 2R (2026)
- Last updated on: September 14, 2026.

Mac Kiger (born December 19, 1998) is an American professional tennis player who specializes in doubles. He has a career-high ATP doubles ranking of No. 70 achieved on September 14, 2026 and a singles ranking of No. 918 in February 27, 2023.

Kiger plays mostly on ATP Challenger Tour, where he won five doubles titles.

Kiger played college tennis at North Carolina.

== ATP Challenger and ITF Tour finals ==
=== Doubles: 23 (14 titles, 9 runner-ups) ===
Legend ATP Challenger Tour (8–6) ITF Futures/WTT (6–3)	Finals by surface Hard (11–6) Clay (3–2) Grass (0–1)

Result	W–L	Date	Tournament	Tier	Surface	Partner	Opponents	Score
Loss	0–1	Nov 2023	Knoxville Challenger, US	Challenger	Hard (i)	(United States) Mitchell Krueger	(United States) Cannon Kingsley (Venezuela) Luis David Martínez	6–7^{(3–7)}, 3–6
Win	1–1	Jul 2024	Championnats de Granby, Canada	Challenger	Hard	(Ecuador) Andrés Andrade	(Canada) Justin Boulais (Canada) Joshua Lapadat	3–6, 6–3, [10–2]
Loss	1–2	Jul 2024	Chicago Men's Challenger, US	Challenger	Hard	(Canada) Benjamin Sigouin	(Australia) Luke Saville (Australia) Li Tu	4–6, 6–3, [3–10]
Loss	1–3	Apr 2025	Savannah Challenger, US	Challenger	Clay	(United States) Patrick Maloney	(Venezuela) Luis David Martínez (Argentina) Federico Agustín Gómez	6–3, 3–6, [5–10]
Win	2–3	Aug 2025	Chicago Men's Challenger, US	Challenger	Hard	(United States) Ryan Seggerman	(United States) Theodore Winegar (United States) Michael Zheng	6–4, 3–6, [10–5]
Win	3–3	Sep 2025	Saint-Tropez Open, France	Challenger	Hard	(United States) Trey Hilderbrand	(Finland) Patrik Niklas-Salminen (Czech Republic) Matěj Vocel	7–6^{(7–5)}, 7–5
Win	4–3	Oct 2025	Sioux Falls Challenger, US	Challenger	Hard (i)	(Australia) Rinky Hijikata	(United States) Andrew Fenty (Venezuela) Juan José Bianchi	6–4, 6–4
Loss	4–4	Oct 2025	Charlottesville Men's Pro Challenger, US	Challenger	Hard (i)	(Canada) Justin Boulais	(Germany) Tim Rühl (Germany) Patrick Zahraj	6–3, 5–7, [10–12]
Win	5–4	Nov 2025	Challenger de Drummondville, Canada	Challenger	Hard (i)	(United States) Trey Hilderbrand	(United States) Karl Poling (Mexico) Alan Magadán	6–3, 6–4
Win	6–4	Jan 2026	Canberra Tennis International, Australia	Challenger	Hard	(United States) Reese Stalder	(Australia) Blake Bayldon (Australia) Patrick Harper	7–6^{(7–3)}, 6–3
Win	7–4	Jan 2026	San Diego Open, United States	Challenger	Hard	(United States) Trey Hilderbrand	(United States) Garrett Johns (United States) Karl Poling	6–3, 6–4
Loss	7–5	Mar 2026	Asunción, Paraguay	Challenger	Clay	(United States) Reese Stalder	(Argentina) Mariano Kestelboim (Brazil) Marcelo Zormann	4–6, 5–7
Win	8–5	Apr 2026	Gwangju Open, South Korea	Challenger	Hard	(United States) Reese Stalder	(India) Anirudh Chandrasekar (Japan) Takeru Yuzuki	6–4, 6–7^{(7–9)}, [10–8]
Loss	8–6	Jun 2026	Nottingham, United Kingdom	Challenger	Grass	(United States) Reese Stalder	(Brazil) Fernando Romboli (United States) Theodore Winegar	3–6, 4–6

Result	W–L	Date	Tournament	Tier	Surface	Partner	Opponents	Score
Loss	0–1	Jul 2022	M15 Waco, US	WTT	Hard	(Canada) Benjamin Sigouin	(United States) George Goldhoff (United States) Tyler Zink	6–4, 5–7, [7–10]
Loss	0–2	Jan 2023	M15 Ithaca, US	WTT	Hard	(Canada) Benjamin Sigouin	(United States) Nick Chappell (United States) Nathan Ponwith	2–6, 4–6
Win	1–2	Jan 2023	M15 Edmond, US	WTT	Hard	(Canada) Benjamin Sigouin	(United States) Collin Altamirano (Romania) Gabi Adrian Boitan	7–6^{(9–7)}, 6–4
Win	2–2	Feb 2023	M15 Palm Coast, US	WTT	Clay	(United States) George Goldhoff	(Argentina) Ignacio Monzón (Argentina) Francisco Comesaña	6–3, 6–4
Win	3–2	Apr 2023	M25 Sanxenxo, Spain	WTT	Hard	(United States) George Goldhoff	(Spain) John Echeverría (Spain) Ricardo Villacorta	6–4, 4–6, [10–7]
Win	4–2	May 2023	M15 Kalmar, Sweden	WTT	Clay	(United States) George Goldhoff	(Netherlands) Stijn Pel (Netherlands) Niels Visker	2–6, 7–6^{(7–4)}, [10–6]
Loss	4–3	Jun 2023	M25 Tulsa, US	WTT	Hard	(Canada) Benjamin Sigouin	(United States) Ozan Baris (United States) Garrett Johns	2–6, 5–7
Win	5–3	Jul 2023	M25 Edwardsville, US	WTT	Hard	(United States) George Goldhoff	(United States) Kareem Al Allaf (United States) Colin Markes	6–2, 6–1
Win	6–3	Feb 2024	M25 Naples, US	WTT	Clay	(Canada) Benjamin Sigouin	(United States) Hunter Heck (Japan) Kenta Miyoshi	6–2, 6–7^{(7–9)}, [10–6]
