= Roman Safiullin =

Russian tennis player (born 1997)

- Safiullin at the 2026 Wimbledon Championships
- Native name: Роман Ришатович Сафиуллин
- Country (sports): Russia
- Residence: Podolsk, Russia
- Born: 7 August 1997 (age 29) Podolsk, Russia
- Height: 1.85 m (6 ft 1 in)
- Turned pro: 2015
- Plays: Right-handed (two-handed backhand)
- Coach: Karl Adrian Ringdal Noerstenaes (2023-), Miro Hrvatin (2025)
- Prize money: US $5,559,958

Singles
- Career record: 64–80
- Career titles: 0
- Highest ranking: No. 36 (8 January 2024)
- Current ranking: No. 74 (9 November 2026)

Grand Slam singles results
- Australian Open: 2R (2021)
- French Open: 2R (2021)
- Wimbledon: QF (2023)
- US Open: 2R (2023, 2024, 2025)

Other tournaments
- Olympic Games: 3R (2024)

Doubles
- Career record: 10–18
- Career titles: 0
- Highest ranking: No. 151 (19 August 2024)

Grand Slam doubles results
- Australian Open: 1R (2024, 2025)
- French Open: 2R (2024)
- US Open: 2R (2023)

Other doubles tournaments
- Olympic Games: 1R (2024)
Medal record
Men's tennis
Representing Russia
Universiade
Bronze medal – third place	2017 Taipei	Men's singles
Bronze medal – third place	2017 Taipei	Men's Team
- Last updated on: 15 October 2026.

Roman Rishatovich Safiullin (Note: Russian: Роман Ришатович Сафиуллин; Tatar: Роман Рәшит улы Сафиуллин, romanized: Roman Räşit ulı Safiullin.) (born 7 August 1997) is a Russian professional tennis player. He has a career-high ATP singles ranking of world No. 36, achieved on 8 January 2024 and a best doubles ranking of No. 151, achieved on 19 August 2024.

== Career ==
=== 2014–2015: Juniors ===
On the junior circuit, Safiullin reached an ITF combined ranking of world No. 2 on 26 May 2014. He is a Grand Slam Junior champion, having won the 2015 Australian Open over Hong Seong-chan. His biggest junior title, after his Australian Open title, is the Grade A Trofeo Bonfiglio where he beat Andrey Rublev in the final.

=== 2020: Challenger titles, top 200 ===
Safiullin claimed his first Challenger tour titles in singles and doubles with Pavel Kotov in Cherbourg, France in February 2020.

=== 2021: Grand Slam debut ===
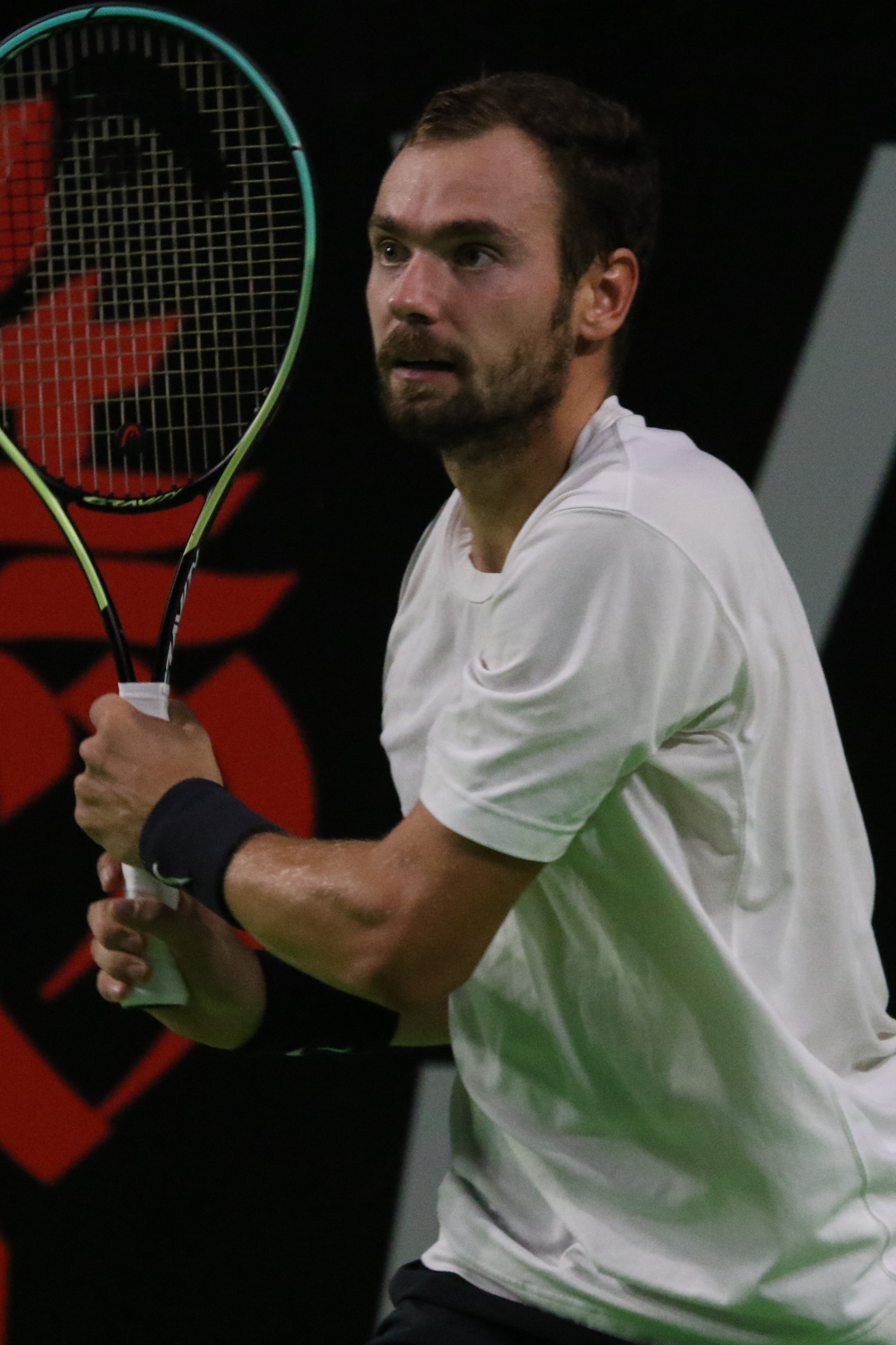
Safiullin in 2021.

Safiullin made his Grand Slam debut at the 2021 Australian Open after qualifying and reached the second round by defeating Ilya Ivashka. He also qualified for the 2021 French Open reaching also the second round with a win over Carlos Taberner. As a result, he reached a career-high singles ranking of No. 156 on 14 June 2021.

=== 2022: ATP Cup and ATP Tour semifinals, top 10 win, top 100 ===
On his debut, he reached the semifinals at the 2022 ATP Cup after winning 2 singles and 3 doubles matches with teammate Daniil Medvedev. As a result, he moved 21 positions up in the rankings to a new career-high in the top 150 in singles of World No. 146 on 10 January 2022.

At the 2022 Australian Open, he qualified as lucky loser after the withdrawal of Casper Ruud where he lost to Alex Molčan.

Safiullin qualified for Marseilles after beating Ernests Gulbis and Julian Lenz. After qualifying, he beat 7th seed Alexei Popyrin and fellow qualifier Tomáš Macháč to reach his first ATP Tour-level quarterfinal. There, he claimed his first top-10 win by beating top seed Stefanos Tsitsipas in straight sets, for the best win in his career, to reach his first semifinal on the ATP Tour. He lost to Félix Auger-Aliassime in straight sets with two tiebreaks.

In July, he won his second Challenger title in Nur Sultan. As a result, he reached a new career-high ranking in the top 120 at world No. 119. He then won a third Challenger title in Chicago, propelling him 25 positions up to a top 100 debut at world No. 97 on 15 August 2022.

In September, Safiullin reached the second semifinal of the season in Tel Aviv, where he lost in straight sets to top seed Novak Djokovic. As a result, he reached a new career-high ranking of world No. 92 on 3 October 2022.

=== 2023–2024: Major quarterfinal, ATP final & top 5 win, top 50 ===
Safiullin reached a new best singles ranking of world No. 82 on 6 February 2023, after he clinched his first ATP Challenger Tour title of the year at the 2023 Koblenz Open. He won four three-set matches before defeating Vasek Pospisil in the final.

Safiullin made his Masters 1000 debut at the 2023 BNP Paribas Open but lost to Ilya Ivashka. He qualified for his second Masters at the 2023 Miami Open but also lost in the first round to Grégoire Barrère.

On clay, he qualified for his third Masters at the 2023 Mutua Madrid Open and on his debut at this tournament, reached the third round for the first time in his career at a Masters level defeating Nicolás Jarry and upsetting 14th seed Tommy Paul. He qualified for his next Masters 1000 at the Italian Open and also on his debut reached the third round, defeating two Americans, Marcos Giron and upsetting 22nd seed Sebastian Korda before losing to Australian Alexei Popyrin.

At the 2023 Wimbledon Championships he defeated 20th seed Roberto Bautista Agut, Corentin Moutet, Guido Pella and 26th seed Denis Shapovalov to reach the quarterfinals of a Major for the first time. He became just the 12th man to reach the quarterfinals on his Wimbledon main draw debut. As a result, he moved into the top 50 rising close to 50 positions up in the rankings. In the quarterfinal match, eighth seed Jannik Sinner proved too strong.

At the 2023 Chengdu Open he reached the semifinals defeating Brandon Nakashima, fourth seed Dan Evans and Jordan Thompson by retirement. He defeated second seed Lorenzo Musetti to reach his first final at ATP tour level. He lost to top seed Alexander Zverev in three sets.

At the 2023 Rolex Shanghai Masters he reached the third round upsetting this time ninth seed Alexander Zverev, his second career top-10 win. At the next Masters in Paris where he qualified on his debut at this tournament, he upset world No. 2 Carlos Alcaraz in the second round in straight sets for the biggest win in his career. He improved to 3-6 against the Top 10 with this win. As a result he reached the top 40 in the rankings on 6 November 2023. At the 2024 Rolex Shanghai Masters, Safiullin went one step further and reached the fourth round for the first time at the 1000-level, with upsets over 23rd seed Alexander Bublik and 13th seed Frances Tiafoe.

=== 2025-2026: Hiatus, Wimbledon fourth round ===
In July 2026, ranked No. 132, he reached the fourth round at the 2026 Wimbledon Championships, upsetting 24th seed Joao Fonseca, after qualifying for the main draw. Safiullin had no tour-level wins in 2026 prior to the grass-court major, having cut short his 2025 season after the 2025 US Open due to injury.

At the China Open, Safiullin defeated world No. 7 Flavio Cobolli in the first round. It was his first victory over a top-10 opponent since 2023.

== Early life ==
Safiullin was born in Podolsk, Russia, to Tatar father Rishat Safiullin and a Russian mother.

== Performance timelines ==
Key
W	F	SF	QF	#R	RR	Q#	P#	DNQ	A	Z#	PO	G	S	B	NMS	NTI	P	NH

(W) winner; (F) finalist; (SF) semifinalist; (QF) quarterfinalist; (#R) rounds 4, 3, 2, 1; (RR) round-robin stage; (Q#) qualification round; (P#) preliminary round; (DNQ) did not qualify; (A) absent; (Z#) Davis/Fed Cup Zonal Group (with number indication) or (PO) play-off; (G) gold, (S) silver or (B) bronze Olympic/Paralympic medal; (NMS) not a Masters tournament; (NTI) not a Tier I tournament; (P) postponed; (NH) not held; (SR) strike rate (events won / competed); (W–L) win–loss record.
To avoid confusion and double counting, these charts are updated at the conclusion of a tournament or when the player's participation has ended.

Current as of 2026 French Open.

Tournament	2020	2021	2022	2023	2024	2025	2026	SR	W–L	Win %
Grand Slam tournaments
Australian Open	A	2R	1R	1R	1R	1R	A	0 / 5	1–5	17%
French Open	Q2	2R	Q1	A	1R	1R	1R	0 / 4	1–4	20%
Wimbledon	NH	Q2	A (Note: Russian athletes were banned from competing following the 2022 Russian invasion of Ukraine.)	QF	3R	1R	4R	0 / 3	6–3	67%
US Open	A	A	Q1	2R	2R	2R		0 / 3	3–3	50%
Win–loss	0–0	2–2	0–1	5–3	3–4	1–4	0–1	0 / 15	11–15	42%
ATP Tour Masters 1000
Indian Wells	A	A	A	1R	2R	2R	A	0 / 3	2–3	40%
Miami Open	A	A	A	1R	2R	3R	A	0 / 3	3–3	50%
Monte-Carlo Masters	A	A	A	Q1	2R	A	A	0 / 1	1–1	50%
Madrid Open	A	A	A	3R	1R	1R	A	0 / 3	2–3	40%
Italian Open	A	A	A	3R	1R	1R	A	0 / 3	2–3	40%
Canadian Open	A	A	A	A	1R	2R		0 / 2	1–2	33%
Cincinnati Open	A	A	A	1R	A	2R		0 / 2	1–2	33%
Shanghai Masters	NH			3R	4R	A		0 / 2	5–2	71%
Paris Masters	A	A	A	3R	A	A		0 / 1	2–1	67%
Win–loss	0–0	0–0	0–0	8–7	6–7	5–6		0 / 20	19–20	49%

== ATP Tour finals ==
=== Singles: 1 (runner-up) ===
Legend Grand Slam (–) ATP 1000 (–) ATP 500 (–) ATP 250 (0–1)	Finals by surface Hard (0–1) Clay (–) Grass (–)	Finals by setting Outdoor (0–1) Indoor (–)

Result	W–L	Date	Tournament	Tier	Surface	Opponent	Score
Loss	0–1	Sep 2023	Chengdu Open, China	ATP 250	Hard	(Germany) Alexander Zverev	7–6^{(7–2)}, 6–7^{(5–7)}, 3–6

== ATP Challenger Tour finals ==
=== Singles: 8 (8 titles) ===
Legend ATP Challenger Tour (8–0)	Finals by surface Hard (6–0) Clay (2–0)

Result	W–L	Date	Tournament	Tier	Surface	Opponent	Score
Win	1–0	Feb 2020	Challenger La Manche, France	Challenger	Hard (i)	(Italy) Roberto Marcora	6–4, 6–2
Win	2–0	Jul 2022	President's Cup, Kazakhstan	Challenger	Hard	(Kazakhstan) Denis Yevseyev	2–6, 6–4, 7–6^{(7–2)}
Win	3–0	Aug 2022	Chicago Men's Challenger, US	Challenger	Hard	(United States) Ben Shelton	6–3, 4–6, 7–5
Win	4–0	Feb 2023	Koblenz Open, Germany	Challenger	Hard (i)	(Canada) Vasek Pospisil	6–2, 7–5
Win	5–0	Aug 2024	Cary Tennis Classic, US	Challenger	Hard	(Italy) Mattia Bellucci	1–6, 7–5, 7–5
Win	6–0	Oct 2024	Slovak Open, Slovakia	Challenger	Hard (i)	(Belgium) Raphaël Collignon	6–3, 6–4
Win	7–0	Apr 2026	Open de Oeiras, Portugal	Challenger	Clay	(France) Valentin Royer	6–1, 6–2
Win	8–0	May 2026	Danube Upper Austria Open, Austria	Challenger	Clay	(Portugal) Jaime Faria	4–6, 6–4, 7–6^{(7–4)}

=== Doubles: 1 (title) ===
Legend ATP Challenger Tour (1–0)

Result	W–L	Date	Tournament	Tier	Surface	Partner	Opponents	Score
Win	1–0	Feb 2020	Challenger La Manche, France	Challenger	Hard (i)	(Russia) Pavel Kotov	(France) Dan Added (France) Albano Olivetti	7–6^{(8–6)}, 5–7, [12–10]

== ITF Tour finals ==
=== Singles: 25 (19 titles, 6 runner-ups) ===
Legend ITF Futures/WTT (19–6)	Finals by surface Hard (16–5) Clay (3–1)

Result	W–L	Date	Tournament	Tier	Surface	Opponent	Score
Win	1–0	Apr 2014	Uzbekistan F1, Qarshi	Futures	Hard	(Uzbekistan) Temur Ismailov	2–6, 7–5, 6–1
Loss	1–1	Aug 2014	Russia F5, Kazan	Futures	Clay	(Russia) Anton Zaytsev	3–6, 4–6
Win	2–1	Aug 2014	Russia F6, Kazan	Futures	Clay	(Russia) Richard Muzaev	6–1, 4–6, 6–1
Win	3–1	Nov 2014	Greece F11, Heraklion	Futures	Hard	(Serbia) Ivan Bjelica	6–0, 3–6, 6–3
Win	4–1	Nov 2014	Greece F12, Heraklion	Futures	Hard	(Serbia) Denis Bejtulahi	4–6, 7–6^{(7–2)}, 6–4
Win	5–1	Nov 2014	Turkey F42, Antalya	Futures	Hard	(Ukraine) Denys Mylokostov	7–6^{(9–7)}, 6–3
Win	6–1	Dec 2014	Turkey F43, Antalya	Futures	Hard	(Portugal) Frederico Ferreira Silva	6–1, 1–2 ret.
Loss	6–2	Feb 2016	Turkey F5, Antalya	Futures	Hard	(South Korea) Hong Seong-chan	2–6, 5–7
Win	7–2	Feb 2016	Turkey F8, Antalya	Futures	Hard	(Bulgaria) Dimitar Kuzmanov	3–6, 7–5, 7–5
Win	8–2	Aug 2016	Egypt F21, Sharm El Sheikh	Futures	Hard	(Czech Republic) Michal Konečný	6–2, 6–1
Loss	8–3	Sep 2016	Egypt F23, Sharm El Sheikh	Futures	Hard	(Tunisia) Anis Ghorbel	7–5, 2–6, 6–7^{(4–7)}
Win	9–3	Oct 2016	Israel F14, Meitar	Futures	Hard	(Israel) Daniel Cukierman	6–0, 6–4
Win	10–3	Oct 2016	Egypt F30, Sharm El Sheikh	Futures	Hard	(Spain) Pablo Vivero González	6–2, 7–6^{(7–5)}
Loss	10–4	Nov 2016	Egypt F32, Sharm El Sheikh	Futures	Hard	(Czech Republic) Michal Schmid	3–6, 6–0, 6–7^{(5–7)}
Win	11–4	Nov 2017	Egypt F34, Sharm El Sheikh	Futures	Hard	(Turkey) Cem İlkel	7–5, 7–6^{(7–3)}
Win	12–4	Mar 2018	Russia F3, Kazan	Futures	Hard (i)	(Uzbekistan) Jurabek Karimov	6–2, 6–1
Win	13–4	Mar 2018	Egypt F10, Sharm El Sheikh	Futures	Hard	(Czech Republic) Jaroslav Pospíšil	6–1, 6–1
Loss	13–5	Jun 2018	Uzbekistan F4, Namangan	Futures	Hard	(Turkey) Cem İlkel	1–6, 6–7^{(12–14)}
Win	14–5	Oct 2018	Vietnam F4, Tây Ninh	Futures	Hard	(Vietnam) Lý Hoàng Nam	7–6^{(9–7)}, 6–4
Win	15–5	Nov 2018	Vietnam F5, Tây Ninh	Futures	Hard	(Vietnam) Lý Hoàng Nam	7–6^{(7–5)}, 6–4
Win	16–5	Nov 2018	Thailand F8, Nonthaburi	Futures	Hard	(Uzbekistan) Sanjar Fayziev	7–5, 4–6, 6–4
Win	17–5	Mar 2019	M25 Kazan, Russia	WTT	Hard (i)	(Uzbekistan) Sanjar Fayziev	6–3, 1–6, 6–4
Win	18–5	Apr 2019	M25 Shymkent, Kazakhstan	WTT	Clay	(Russia) Alen Avidzba	7–6^{(7–2)}, 6–2
Win	19–5	Apr 2019	M25 Shymkent, Kazakhstan	WTT	Clay	(Ukraine) Vladyslav Manafov	7–5, 6–3
Loss	19–6	May 2019	M25 Namangan, Uzbekistan	WTT	Hard	(Netherlands) Tim van Rijthoven	7–6^{(7–5)}, 5–7, 4–6

=== Doubles: 10 (3 titles, 7 runner-ups) ===
Legend ITF Futures/WTT (3–7)	Finals by surface Hard (2–5) Clay (1–2)

Result	W–L	Date	Tournament	Tier	Surface	Partner	Opponents	Score
Loss	0–1	Aug 2014	Russia, Kazan	Futures	Clay	(Croatia) Marin Bradarić	(Russia) Ilia Shatskiy (Russia) Alexander Zhurbin	5–7, 1–6
Loss	0–2	Aug 2014	Russia, Kazan	Futures	Clay	(Russia) Alexander Bublik	(Russia) Andrey Levine (Russia) Anton Zaytsev	1–6, 3–6
Win	1–2	Mar 2016	Tunisia, Hammamet	Futures	Clay	(Austria) Lenny Hampel	(Russia) Ivan Nedelko (Finland) Henrik Sillanpää	6–1, 6–3
Loss	1–3	Aug 2016	Egypt, Sharm El Sheikh	Futures	Hard	(Czech Republic) Michal Konečný	(Brazil) Pedro Bernardi (Guatemala) Christopher Díaz Figueroa	6–7^{(4–7)}, 7–6^{(7–2)}, [7–10]
Loss	1–4	Mar 2018	Russia, Kazan	Futures	Hard (i)	(Russia) Teymuraz Gabashvili	(Russia) Alexander Pavlioutchenkov (Russia) Evgenii Tiurnev	4–6, 6–3, [6–10]
Win	2–4	Apr 2018	Uzbekistan, Qarshi	Futures	Hard	(Russia) Konstantin Kravchuk	(India) Saketh Myneni (India) Vijay Sundar Prashanth	3–6, 7–5, [10–7]
Loss	2–5	Jun 2018	Uzbekistan, Andijan	Futures	Hard	(Russia) Konstantin Kravchuk	(Belarus) Sergey Betov (Belarus) Yaraslav Shyla	4–6, 6–7^{(2–7)}
Loss	2–6	Jun 2018	Uzbekistan, Namangan	Futures	Hard	(Russia) Konstantin Kravchuk	(Uzbekistan) Sanjar Fayziev (Uzbekistan) Khumoyun Sultanov	6–7^{(6–8)}, 7–5, [8–10]
Loss	2–7	Nov 2018	Vietnam, Tây Ninh	Futures	Hard	(Vietnam) Lý Hoàng Nam	(Philippines) Francis Alcantara (Sweden) Markus Eriksson	7–5, 4–6, [7–10]
Win	3–7	May 2019	M25 Namangan, Uzbekistan	WTT	Hard	(Russia) Evgenii Tiurnev	(Uzbekistan) Sanjar Fayziev (Uzbekistan) Khumoyun Sultanov	7–6^{(7–5)}, 6–3

== Wins over top 10 players ==
- Safiullin has a 4–8 record against players who were, at the time the match was played, ranked in the top 10.

Season	2022	2023	2026	Total
Wins	1	2	1	4

#	Player	Rank	Event	Surface	Rd	Score	RSR
2022
1.	(Greece) Stefanos Tsitsipas	4	Open 13 Provence, France	Hard (i)	QF	6–4, 6–4	163
2023
2.	(Germany) Alexander Zverev	10	Shanghai Masters, China	Hard	2R	6–3, 6–1	50
3.	(Spain) Carlos Alcaraz	2	Paris Masters, France	Hard (i)	2R	6–3, 6–4	45
2026
4.	(Italy) Flavio Cobolli	7	China Open, China	Hard	1R	6–3, 6–2	84

*As of 1 October 2026

== Junior Grand Slam finals ==
=== Singles: 1 (title) ===
Result	Year	Tournament	Surface	Opponent	Score
Win	2015	Australian Open	Hard	(South Korea) Hong Seong-chan	7–5, 7–6^{(7–2)}

== Awards ==
- The Russian Cup in the nominations:
  - Team of the Year — Boys Under-16: 2013. (Note: (as part of the Team: Roman Safiullin, Evgenii Tiurnev, Andrey Rublev; captain Ivan Pridankin))
  - Junior of the Year: 2015.
