= Chicago Men's Challenger =

Tennis tournament in Chicago

Chicago Challenger
- 2025 Chicago Men's Challenger

ATP Challenger Tour
- Event name: Chicago Tennis Challenger
- Location: Chicago, United States
- Category: ATP Challenger Tour
- Surface: Hard
- Prize money: $100,000
- Website: Website

The Chicago Challenger is a professional tennis tournament played on hardcourts. It is currently part of the Association of Tennis Professionals (ATP) Challenger Tour. It was held in Chicago, United States from 2022 until 2025.

== Past finals ==
=== Singles ===
Year	Champion	Runner-up	Score
2025	(United States) Michael Zheng	(Chinese Taipei) Hsu Yu-hsiou	6–4, 6–2
2024	(Canada) Gabriel Diallo	(China) Bu Yunchaokete	6–3, 7–6^{(7–3)}
2023	(United States) Alex Michelsen	(Japan) Yuta Shimizu	7–5, 6–2
2022	Roman Safiullin	(United States) Ben Shelton	6–3, 4–6, 7–5

=== Doubles ===
Year	Champions	Runners-up	Score
2025	(United States) Mac Kiger (United States) Ryan Seggerman	(United States) Theodore Winegar (United States) Michael Zheng	6–4, 3–6, [10–5]
2024	(Australia) Luke Saville (Australia) Li Tu	(United States) Mac Kiger (Canada) Benjamin Sigouin	6–4, 3–6, [10–3]
2023	(Latvia) Miķelis Lībietis (Tunisia) Skander Mansouri	(South Korea) Chung Yun-seong (Australia) Andrew Harris	7–6^{(7–5)}, 6–3
2022	(Sweden) André Göransson (Japan) Ben McLachlan	(United States) Evan King (United States) Mitchell Krueger	6–4, 6–7^{(3–7)}, [10–5]
