= 2017 Challenger La Manche – Singles =

Singles
- 2017 Challenger La Manche

Final
- Champion: (France) Mathias Bourgue
- Runner-up: (Germany) Maximilian Marterer
- Score: 6–3, 7–6^{(7–3)}

Events
Singles	Doubles
← 2016 ·	Challenger La Manche	· 2018 →

Jordan Thompson was the defending champion but chose not to defend his title.

Mathias Bourgue won the title after defeating Maximilian Marterer 6–3, 7–6^{(7–3)} in the final.

== Seeds ==
1. (France) Jérémy Chardy (first round)
2. (Ukraine) Illya Marchenko (first round)
3. (France) Julien Benneteau (semifinals)
4. (Slovakia) Norbert Gombos (quarterfinals)
5. (South Korea) Lee Duck-hee (second round)
6. (Germany) Peter Gojowczyk (quarterfinals)
7. (Italy) Luca Vanni (second round)
8. (Belarus) Uladzimir Ignatik (first round)

== Draw ==
=== Key ===
- Q = Qualifier
- WC = Wild card
- LL = Lucky loser
- Alt = Alternate
- SE = Special exempt
- PR = Protected ranking
- ITF = ITF entry
- JE = Junior exempt
- w/o = Walkover
- r = Retired
- d = Defaulted
- SR = Special ranking

=== Finals ===
Semifinals
(France) Kenny de Schepper	6	6^{4}	3
(France) Mathias Bourgue	4	7^{7}	6
3	(France) Julien Benneteau	4	7^{9}	6^{5}
(Germany) Maximilian Marterer	6	6^{7}	7^{7}

Final
(France) Mathias Bourgue	6	7^{7}
(Germany) Maximilian Marterer	3	6^{3}

=== Top half ===
First round
1	(France) J Chardy	6	6^{3}	6^{5}
(Canada) S Diez	3	7^{7}	7^{7}
Q	(France) C Moutet	6	3	6
(Germany) Jeremy Jahn	4	6	3
(Italy) S Napolitano	5	0
Q	(France) H Nys	7	6
(France) K de Schepper	6	7^{7}
8	(Belarus) U Ignatik	3	6^{5}
4	(Slovakia) N Gombos	6	7
(Italy) L Giustino	2	5
(Belarus) I Ivashka	2	6	6
SE	(United Kingdom) E Corrie	6	4	3
(France) M Bourgue	7^{7}	6
(Germany) D Brands	6^{2}	4
WC	(France) A Sidorenko	1	4
5	(South Korea) D-h Lee	6	6

Second round
(Canada) S Diez	6	3	2
Q	(France) C Moutet	4	6	6
Q	(France) H Nys	4	3
(France) K de Schepper	6	6
4	(Slovakia) N Gombos	7^{7}	6
(Belarus) I Ivashka	6^{3}	1
(France) M Bourgue	6	6
5	(South Korea) D-h Lee	4	4

Quarterfinals
Q	(France) C Moutet	5	3
(France) K de Schepper	7	6
4	(Slovakia) N Gombos	6^{5}	6^{5}
(France) M Bourgue	7^{7}	7^{7}

Semifinals
(France) K de Schepper	6	6^{4}	3
(France) M Bourgue	4	7^{7}	6

=== Bottom half ===
First round
6	(Germany) P Gojowczyk	6	6
WC	(France) G Blancaneaux	2	4
WC	(France) A Michon	6	7^{11}
Q	(Germany) D Masur	4	6^{9}
(Serbia) M Zekić	3	4
(Spain) A Menéndez-Maceiras	6	6
Q	(Serbia) F Krajinović	5	3
3	(France) J Benneteau	7	6
7	(Italy) L Vanni	6	6
(Bosnia and Herzegovina) M Bašić	4	4
(Germany) M Marterer	7^{7}	6
(France) Q Halys	6^{4}	3
(Belgium) Y Reuter	7^{7}	2	6^{5}
(France) T Lamasine	6^{4}	6	7^{7}
WC	(France) M Janvier	6	6^{2}	6
2	(Ukraine) I Marchenko	3	7^{7}	3

Second round
6	(Germany) P Gojowczyk	6	6
WC	(France) A Michon	2	4
(Spain) A Menéndez-Maceiras	7^{7}	2	3
3	(France) J Benneteau	6^{5}	6	6
7	(Italy) L Vanni	6^{5}	2
(Germany) M Marterer	7^{7}	6
(France) T Lamasine	3	7^{7}	3
WC	(France) M Janvier	6	6^{5}	6

Quarterfinals
6	(Germany) P Gojowczyk	4	6	4
3	(France) J Benneteau	6	1	6
(Germany) M Marterer	7	7
WC	(France) M Janvier	5	5

Semifinals
3	(France) J Benneteau	4	7^{9}	6^{5}
(Germany) M Marterer	6	6^{7}	7^{7}
