= 2017 Challenger La Manche – Doubles =

Doubles
- 2017 Challenger La Manche

Final
- Champions: (Czech Republic) Roman Jebavý (Slovakia) Igor Zelenay
- Runners-up: (Croatia) Dino Marcan (Austria) Tristan-Samuel Weissborn
- Score: 7–6^{(7–4)}, 6–7^{(4–7)}, [10–6]

Events
Singles	Doubles
← 2016 ·	Challenger La Manche	· 2018 →

Ken and Neal Skupski were the defending champions but chose not to defend their title.

Roman Jebavý and Igor Zelenay won the title after defeating Dino Marcan and Tristan-Samuel Weissborn 7–6^{(7–4)}, 6–7^{(4–7)}, [10–6] in the final.

== Seeds ==
1. (United Kingdom) Jonathan Marray / (Canada) Adil Shamasdin (first round)
2. (Russia) Mikhail Elgin / (Belarus) Andrei Vasilevski (semifinals)
3. (Czech Republic) Roman Jebavý / (Slovakia) Igor Zelenay (champions)
4. (Croatia) Dino Marcan / (Austria) Tristan-Samuel Weissborn (final)

== Draw ==
=== Key ===
- Q = Qualifier
- WC = Wild card
- LL = Lucky loser
- Alt = Alternate
- SE = Special exempt
- PR = Protected ranking
- ITF = ITF entry
- JE = Junior exempt
- w/o = Walkover
- r = Retired
- d = Defaulted
- SR = Special ranking

First round
1	(United Kingdom) J Marray (Canada) A Shamasdin	7^{8}	1	[5]
(Australia) R Junaid (Belgium) J Vliegen	6^{6}	6	[10]
(Canada) S Diez (Netherlands) M Vervoort	0	2
(Uruguay) A Behar (Kazakhstan) A Golubev	6	6
3	(Czech Republic) R Jebavý (Slovakia) I Zelenay	7	7^{7}
(Italy) A Arnaboldi (Italy) L Vanni	5	6^{5}
(Spain) A Menéndez-Maceiras (Italy) S Napolitano	2	3
(France) Q Halys (France) T Lamasine	6	6
WC	(France) Maxence Brovillé (France) M Martineau	6	7
(Germany) Jeremy Jahn (Belgium) Y Reuter	1	5
(Switzerland) L Margaroli (France) H Nys	4	2
4	(Croatia) D Marcan (Austria) T-S Weissborn	6	6
(Italy) R Ghedin (Germany) A Mies	3	6	[10]
WC	(France) G Blancaneaux (France) Y Jankovits	6	0	[4]
WC	(France) Joffrey de Schepper (France) K de Schepper	6^{5}	2
2	(Russia) M Elgin (Belarus) A Vasilevski	7^{7}	6

Quarterfinals
(Australia) R Junaid (Belgium) J Vliegen	6^{4}	4
(Uruguay) A Behar (Kazakhstan) A Golubev	7^{7}	6
3	(Czech Republic) R Jebavý (Slovakia) I Zelenay	7^{7}	6
(France) Q Halys (France) T Lamasine	6^{2}	4
WC	(France) M Brovillé (France) M Martineau	4	4
4	(Croatia) D Marcan (Austria) T-S Weissborn	6	6
(Italy) R Ghedin (Germany) A Mies	3	6	[5]
2	(Russia) M Elgin (Belarus) A Vasilevski	6	3	[10]

Semifinals
(Uruguay) A Behar (Kazakhstan) A Golubev	3	2
3	(Czech Republic) R Jebavý (Slovakia) I Zelenay	6	6
4	(Croatia) D Marcan (Austria) T-S Weissborn	6	6
2	(Russia) M Elgin (Belarus) A Vasilevski	4	4

Final
3	(Czech Republic) R Jebavý (Slovakia) I Zelenay	7^{7}	6^{4}	[10]
4	(Croatia) D Marcan (Austria) T-S Weissborn	6^{4}	7^{7}	[6]
