= 2014 Challenger La Manche =

- Date: February 24 – March 2
- Edition: 21st
- Draw: 32S / 16D
- Prize money: €64,000
- Surface: Hard (indoor)
- Location: Cherbourg, France

Champions

Singles
- (France) Kenny de Schepper

Doubles
- (Finland) Henri Kontinen / (Russia) Konstantin Kravchuk
← 2013 ·	Challenger La Manche	· 2015 →

The 2014 Challenger La Manche was a professional tennis tournament played on indoor hard courts. It was the 21st edition of the tournament which was part of the 2014 ATP Challenger Tour. It took place in Cherbourg, France between February 24 and March 2, 2014.

== Singles main-draw entrants ==
=== Seeds ===
Country	Player	Rank^{1}	Seed
FRA	Kenny de Schepper	83	1
GER	Dustin Brown	94	2
GBR	Daniel Evans	124	3
FRA	Marc Gicquel	131	4
FRA	Pierre-Hugues Herbert	134	5
LTU	Ričardas Berankis	149	6
ITA	Marco Cecchinato	167	7
FRA	Vincent Millot	170	8

- Rankings are as of February 17, 2014.

=== Other entrants ===
The following players received wildcards into the singles main draw:

- (France) Lucas Pouille
- (France) Axel Michon
- (France) Albano Olivetti

The following players received special exempt into the singles main draw:

- (Georgia (country)) Nikoloz Basilashvili

The following players used Protected Rankings to gain entry into the singles main draw:

- (Italy) Simone Bolelli
- (Luxembourg) Gilles Müller

The following players received entry from the qualifying draw:

- (France) Florent Serra
- (Lithuania) Laurynas Grigelis
- (Japan) Taro Daniel
- (France) Jules Marie

== Champions ==
=== Singles ===
- (France) Kenny de Schepper def. (Slovakia) Norbert Gomboš, 3–6, 6–2, 6–3

=== Doubles ===
- (Finland) Henri Kontinen / (Russia) Konstantin Kravchuk def. (France) Pierre-Hugues Herbert / (France) Albano Olivetti, 6–4, 6–7^{(3–7)}, [10–7]
