= 2015 Challenger La Manche – Singles =

Singles
- 2015 Challenger La Manche

Final
- Champion: (Slovakia) Norbert Gombos
- Runner-up: (France) Benoît Paire
- Score: 6–1, 7–6^{(7–4)}

Events
Singles	Doubles
← 2014 ·	Challenger La Manche	· 2016 →

Kenny de Schepper was the defending champion, but lost in the quarterfinals.
The previous year's runner-up Norbert Gombos won the title, defeating Benoît Paire in the final, 6–1, 7–6^{(7–4)}.

== Seeds ==
1. (France) Kenny de Schepper (quarterfinals)
2. (Belgium) Steve Darcis (second round, retired)
3. (Germany) Andreas Beck (first round)
4. (Uzbekistan) Farrukh Dustov (first round)
5. (France) Nicolas Mahut (second round)
6. (France) Benoît Paire (final)
7. (Slovakia) Norbert Gombos (champion)
8. (Belgium) Niels Desein (second round)

== Draw ==
=== Key ===
- Q = Qualifier
- WC = Wild card
- LL = Lucky loser
- Alt = Alternate
- SE = Special exempt
- PR = Protected ranking
- ITF = ITF entry
- JE = Junior exempt
- w/o = Walkover
- r = Retired
- d = Defaulted
- SR = Special ranking

=== Finals ===
Semifinals
6/WC	(France) Benoît Paire	6	6
WC	(France) Enzo Couacaud	4	1
(Belgium) Maxime Authom	4	1
7	(Slovakia) Norbert Gombos	6	6

Final
6/WC	(France) Benoît Paire	1	6^{4}
7	(Slovakia) Norbert Gombos	6	7^{7}

=== Top half ===
First round
1	(France) K de Schepper	6	6
(France) D Guez	3	4
(Belarus) U Ignatik	3	6	6^{3}
(Russia) A Karatsev	6	3	7^{7}
(France) L Lokoli	6	6
(Slovakia) A Martin	4	2
Q	(Belarus) S Betov	4	6^{3}
6/WC	(France) B Paire	6	7^{7}
4	(Uzbekistan) F Dustov	2	3
(Bosnia and Herzegovina) A Šetkić	6	6
(Italy) A Arnaboldi	7	6
Alt	(United Kingdom) L Broady	5	2
WC	(France) E Couacaud	6	6
SE	(Bosnia and Herzegovina) M Bašić	4	3
(France) A Michon	2	2
5	(France) N Mahut	6	6

Second round
1	(France) K de Schepper	4	6	6
(Russia) A Karatsev	6	3	2
(France) L Lokoli	6	1	1
6/WC	(France) B Paire	3	6	6
(Bosnia and Herzegovina) A Šetkić	4	5
(Italy) A Arnaboldi	6	7
WC	(France) E Couacaud	6	6
5	(France) N Mahut	3	1

Quarterfinals
1	(France) K de Schepper	4	2
6/WC	(France) B Paire	6	6
(Italy) A Arnaboldi	6	3	6^{4}
WC	(France) E Couacaud	2	6	7^{7}

Semifinals
6/WC	(France) B Paire	6	6
WC	(France) E Couacaud	4	1

=== Bottom half ===
First round
8	(Belgium) N Desein	6	3	6
Q	(Italy) F Gaio	2	6	2
(Russia) K Kravchuk	4	6	6
WC	(France) J Eysseric	6	2	1
(Slovakia) J Kovalík	6	4	6^{1}
(Belgium) M Authom	0	6	7^{7}
(Japan) T Daniel	6	6
3	(Germany) A Beck	2	3
7	(Slovakia) N Gombos	6	3	6
WC	(France) A Sidorenko	1	6	1
Q	(Germany) D Brands	6	3	7^{7}
(France) T Lamasine	4	6	6^{2}
Q	(France) M Teixeira	6	2
(Ukraine) D Molchanov	2	0^{r}
(Czech Republic) J Mertl	3	2
2	(Belgium) S Darcis	6	6

Second round
8	(Belgium) N Desein	4	3
(Russia) K Kravchuk	6	6
(Belgium) M Authom	6	6
(Japan) T Daniel	2	3
7	(Slovakia) N Gombos	6	6
Q	(Germany) D Brands	4	3
Q	' (France) M Teixeira	7^{7}	6
2	(Belgium) S Darcis	6^{5}	4

Quarterfinals
(Russia) K Kravchuk	3	6^{6}
(Belgium) M Authom	6	7^{8}
7	(Slovakia) N Gombos	6	2	6
Q	(France) M Teixeira	2	6	1

Semifinals
(Belgium) M Authom	4	1
7	(Slovakia) N Gombos	6	6
