= 2014 Challenger La Manche – Singles =

Singles
- 2014 Challenger La Manche

Final
- Champion: (France) Kenny de Schepper
- Runner-up: (Slovakia) Norbert Gomboš
- Score: 3–6, 6–2, 6–3

Events
| Singles | Doubles |
| ← 2013 · | Challenger La Manche | · 2015 → |

Jesse Huta Galung was the defending champion, but chose to compete at the 2014 Dubai Tennis Championships instead.
Kenny de Schepper won the title, defeating Norbert Gomboš in the final, 3–6, 6–2, 6–3.

== Seeds ==
1. (France) Kenny de Schepper (champion)
2. (Germany) Dustin Brown (quarterfinals)
3. (United Kingdom) Daniel Evans (first round)
4. (France) Marc Gicquel (first round)
5. (France) Pierre-Hugues Herbert (second round)
6. (Lithuania) Ričardas Berankis (semifinals)
7. (Italy) Marco Cecchinato (second round)
8. (France) Vincent Millot (second round)

== Draw ==
=== Key ===
- Q = Qualifier
- WC = Wild card
- LL = Lucky loser
- Alt = Alternate
- SE = Special exempt
- PR = Protected ranking
- ITF = ITF entry
- JE = Junior exempt
- w/o = Walkover
- r = Retired
- d = Defaulted
- SR = Special ranking

=== Finals ===
Semifinals
1 | (France) Kenny de Schepper | 7^{10} | 6
(Uzbekistan) Farrukh Dustov | 6^{8} | 4
6 | (Lithuania) Ričardas Berankis | 6^{2} | 6 | 2
(Slovakia) Norbert Gomboš | 7^{7} | 3 | 6

Final
1 | (France) Kenny de Schepper | 3 | 6 | 6
(Slovakia) Norbert Gomboš | 6 | 2 | 3

=== Top half ===
First round
1 | (France) K de Schepper | 4 | 6 | 7
(Russia) K Kravchuk | 6 | 4 | 5
PR | (Italy) S Bolelli | 6 | 6
(Belgium) N Desein | 3 | 1
(Italy) A Arnaboldi | 5 | 6^{3}
WC | (France) A Olivetti | 7 | 7^{7}
WC | (France) A Michon | 3 | 1
5 | (France) P-H Herbert | 6 | 6
4 | (France) M Gicquel | 3 | 5
PR | (Luxembourg) G Müller | 6 | 7
(Hungary) M Fucsovics | 2 | 1
(Czech Republic) J Pospíšil | 6 | 6
(United States) A Krajicek | 4 | 2
(Uzbekistan) F Dustov | 6 | 6
Q | (France) F Serra | 6 | 6^{5} | 2
7 | (Italy) M Cecchinato | 4 | 7^{7} | 6

Second round
1 | (France) K de Schepper | 6 | 6^{4} | 6
PR | (Italy) S Bolelli | 3 | 7^{7} | 4
WC | (France) A Olivetti | 6 | 5 | 7^{9}
5 | (France) P-H Herbert | 4 | 6 | 6^{7}
PR | (Luxembourg) G Müller | 4 | 4
(Czech Republic) J Pospíšil | 6 | 6
(Uzbekistan) F Dustov | 6 | 6
7 | (Italy) M Cecchinato | 2 | 2

Quarterfinals
1 | (France) K de Schepper | 6 | 6
WC | (France) A Olivetti | 3 | 4
(Czech Republic) J Pospíšil | 3 | 6 | 3
(Uzbekistan) F Dustov | 6 | 3 | 6

Semifinals
1 | (France) K de Schepper | 7^{10} | 6
(Uzbekistan) F Dustov | 6^{8} | 4

=== Bottom half ===
First round
6 | (Lithuania) R Berankis | 6 | 6
(France) G Burquier | 2 | 2
(France) D Guez | 6 | 6
Q | (Lithuania) L Grigelis | 0 | 2
WC | (France) L Pouille | 6 | 6
(France) M Teixeira | 3 | 3
(Czech Republic) J Mertl | 4 | 6 | 6
3 | (United Kingdom) D Evans | 6 | 4 | 3
8 | (France) V Millot | 6 | 6
(Italy) M Viola | 2 | 1
(Slovakia) N Gomboš | 7^{7} | 7^{8}
Q | (Japan) T Daniel | 6^{1} | 6^{6}
SE | (Georgia (country)) N Basilashvili | 6 | 5 | 4
(Italy) F Cipolla | 3 | 7 | 6
Q | (France) Jules Marie | 4 | 2
2 | (Germany) D Brown | 6 | 6

Second round
6 | (Lithuania) R Berankis | 6 | 3 | 6
(France) D Guez | 3 | 6 | 2
WC | (France) L Pouille | 6 | 2 | 7
(Czech Republic) J Mertl | 4 | 6 | 5
8 | (France) V Millot | 4 | 6 | 2
(Slovakia) N Gomboš | 6 | 4 | 6
(Italy) F Cipolla | 3 | 1
2 | (Germany) D Brown | 6 | 6

Quarterfinals
6 | (Lithuania) R Berankis | 3 | 6 | 6
WC | (France) L Pouille | 6 | 4 | 4
(Slovakia) N Gomboš | 6 | 7^{7}
2 | (Germany) D Brown | 3 | 6^{3}

Semifinals
6 | (Lithuania) R Berankis | 6^{2} | 6 | 3
(Slovakia) N Gomboš | 7^{7} | 3 | 6
