= 2016 Challenger La Manche =

- Date: 22–28 February
- Edition: 23rd
- Draw: 32S / 16D
- Prize money: €42,500+H
- Surface: Hard (indoor)
- Location: Cherbourg, France

Champions

Singles
- (Australia) Jordan Thompson

Doubles
- (United Kingdom) Ken Skupski / (United Kingdom) Neal Skupski
← 2015 ·	Challenger La Manche	· 2017 →

The 2016 Challenger La Manche was a professional tennis tournament played on indoor hard courts. It was the 23rd edition of the tournament which was part of the 2016 ATP Challenger Tour. It took place in Cherbourg, France between 22 and 28 February.

== Singles main-draw entrants ==
=== Seeds ===
Country	Player	Rank^{1}	Seed
SRB	Filip Krajinović	98	1
JPN	Yoshihito Nishioka	110	2
FRA	Pierre-Hugues Herbert	111	3
GER	Daniel Brands	132	4
CZE	Adam Pavlásek	144	5
AUS	Jordan Thompson	149	6
RUS	Karen Khachanov	150	7
FRA	Kenny de Schepper	152	8

- Rankings are as of 15 February 2016.

=== Other entrants ===
The following players received wildcards into the singles main draw:

- (France) Grégoire Barrère
- (France) Calvin Hemery
- (France) Albano Olivetti
- (France) Alexandre Sidorenko

The following player received a special exemption into the singles main draw:

- (Czech Republic) Jan Hernych

The following players received entry from the qualifying draw:

- (Belgium) Maxime Authom
- (France) Sadio Doumbia
- (Denmark) Frederik Nielsen
- (France) Maxime Teixeira

== Champions ==
=== Singles ===
- (Australia) Jordan Thompson def. (Czech Republic) Adam Pavlásek 4–6, 6–4, 6–1

=== Doubles ===
- (United Kingdom) Ken Skupski / (United Kingdom) Neal Skupski def. (Japan) Yoshihito Nishioka / (Bosnia and Herzegovina) Aldin Šetkić 4–6, 6–3, [10–6]
