= 2018 Challenger La Manche – Singles =

Singles
- 2018 Challenger La Manche

Final
- Champion: (Germany) Maximilian Marterer
- Runner-up: (France) Constant Lestienne
- Score: 6–4, 7–5

Events
Singles	Doubles
- Challenger La Manche

Mathias Bourgue was the defending champion but lost in the second round to Constant Lestienne.

Maximilian Marterer won the title after defeating Lestienne 6–4, 7–5 in the final.

== Seeds ==
1. (France) Gilles Simon (second round)
2. (Germany) Maximilian Marterer (champion)
3. (Tunisia) Malek Jaziri (second round)
4. (Italy) Matteo Berrettini (semifinals)
5. (Germany) Oscar Otte (second round)
6. (Slovakia) Norbert Gombos (first round)
7. (France) Kenny de Schepper (quarterfinals)
8. (France) Calvin Hemery (first round)

== Draw ==
Key

- Q = Qualifier
- WC = Wild card
- LL = Lucky loser
- Alt = Alternate
- ITF = ITF entry
- PR = Protected ranking
- SR = Special ranking
- SE = Special exempt
- JE = Junior exempt
- JR = Junior Accelerator Programme entrant
- CO = College Accelerator Programme entrant
- NG = Next Gen Accelerator Program entrant
- w/o = Walkover
- r = Retired
- d = Defaulted

=== Finals ===
Semifinals
(Germany) Mats Moraing	3	4
WC	(France) Constant Lestienne	6	6
4	(Italy) Matteo Berrettini	4	6^{7}
2	(Germany) Maximilian Marterer	6	7^{9}

Final
WC	(France) Constant Lestienne	4	5
2	(Germany) Maximilian Marterer	6	7

=== Top half ===
First round
1	(France) G Simon	6	7^{7}
(France) B Bonzi	4	6^{5}
(Portugal) G Oliveira	5	6^{2}
(Germany) M Moraing	7	7^{7}
WC	(France) A Hoang	6	4	6^{7}
Q	(Sweden) M Ymer	3	6	7^{9}
(France) G Sakharov	6	6
8	(France) C Hemery	2	1
3/Alt	(Tunisia) M Jaziri	6	6
WC	(France) G Blancaneaux	4	4
(Germany) T Kamke	7^{7}	6
(Czech Republic) V Šafránek	6^{1}	4
WC	(France) C Lestienne	6	6
(Austria) D Novak	1	2
(France) M Bourgue	6	6
6	(Slovakia) N Gombos	3	4

Second round
1	(France) G Simon	4	4
(Germany) M Moraing	6	6
Q	(Sweden) M Ymer	6	6
(France) G Sakharov	4	4
3/Alt	(Tunisia) M Jaziri	6^{8}	2
(Germany) T Kamke	7^{10}	6
WC	(France) C Lestienne	6	1	6
(France) M Bourgue	2	6	3

Quarterfinals
(Germany) M Moraing	6	6
Q	(Sweden) M Ymer	2	2
(Germany) T Kamke	3	6	3
WC	(France) C Lestienne	6	4	6

Semifinals
(Germany) M Moraing	3	4
WC	(France) C Lestienne	6	6

=== Bottom half ===
First round
7	(France) K de Schepper	6	3	6
WC	(France) C Denolly	3	6	4
(Spain) C Taberner	1	1
(Russia) A Vatutin	6	6
(Czech Republic) A Pavlásek	6	2	6
Q	(France) R Boutillier	4	6	4
LL	(France) Maxime Tabatruong	7^{7}	5	4
4	(Italy) M Berrettini	6^{3}	7	6
5	(Germany) O Otte	6	6
Q	(United Kingdom) J Clarke	2	2
(Poland) K Majchrzak	3	1^{r}
Q	(Australia) A Popyrin	6	2
(Bosnia and Herzegovina) T Brkić	6^{2}	2
(Italy) L Vanni	7^{7}	6
(Spain) J Munar	3	6^{4}
2	(Germany) M Marterer	6	7^{7}

Second round
7	(France) K de Schepper	w/o
(Russia) A Vatutin
(Czech Republic) A Pavlásek	3	6^{3}
4	(Italy) M Berrettini	6	7^{7}
5	(Germany) O Otte	4	6	3
Q	(Australia) A Popyrin	6	3	6
(Italy) L Vanni	4	3
2	(Germany) M Marterer	6	6

Quarterfinals
7	(France) K de Schepper	4	5
4	(Italy) M Berrettini	6	7
Q	(Australia) A Popyrin	2	4
2	(Germany) M Marterer	6	6

Semifinals
4	(Italy) M Berrettini	4	6^{7}
2	(Germany) M Marterer	6	7^{9}
