= 2016 Challenger La Manche – Doubles =

Doubles
- 2016 Challenger La Manche

Final
- Champions: (United Kingdom) Ken Skupski; (United Kingdom) Neal Skupski
- Runners-up: (Japan) Yoshihito Nishioka; (Bosnia and Herzegovina) Aldin Šetkić
- Score: 4–6, 6–3, [10–6]

Events
Singles	Doubles
← 2015 ·	Challenger La Manche	· 2017 →

Andreas Beck and Jan Mertl are the defending champions, but chose not to defend their title .

Ken Skupski and Neal Skupski won the title, defeating Yoshihito Nishioka and Aldin Šetkić in the final 4–6, 6–3, [10–6].

== Seeds ==
1. (United Kingdom) Ken Skupski / (United Kingdom) Neal Skupski (champions)
2. (Sweden) Johan Brunström / (Denmark) Frederik Nielsen (quarterfinals)
3. (Croatia) Dino Marcan / (India) Divij Sharan (first round)
4. (Italy) Andrea Arnaboldi / (Romania) Adrian Ungur (first round)

== Draw ==
=== Key ===
- Q = Qualifier
- WC = Wild card
- LL = Lucky loser
- Alt = Alternate
- SE = Special exempt
- PR = Protected ranking
- ITF = ITF entry
- JE = Junior exempt
- w/o = Walkover
- r = Retired
- d = Defaulted
- SR = Special ranking

First round

Quarterfinals

Semifinals

Final

1
(United Kingdom) K Skupski
(United Kingdom) N Skupski
6
6

- (Russia) A Karatsev
- (Czech Republic) A Pavlásek
3
4

1
(United Kingdom) K Skupski
(United Kingdom) N Skupski
6
7^{8}

WC
(France) T Lamasine
(France) A Olivetti
5
7^{7}
[10]

WC
- (France) T Lamasine
- (France) A Olivetti
4
6^{6}

WC
- (France) Joffrey de Schepper
- (France) K de Schepper
7
6^{1}
[2]

1
(United Kingdom) K Skupski
(United Kingdom) N Skupski
7
6

3
- (Croatia) D Marcan
- (India) D Sharan
6^{8}
1

- (United States) J Cerretani
- (Austria) T-S Weissborn
5
3

(United States) J Cerretani
(Austria) T-S Weissborn
7^{10}
6

(United States) J Cerretani
(Austria) T-S Weissborn
6
6

WC
- (Belgium) M Authom
- (France) R Jouan
5
7^{7}
[10]

- (Australia) J Thompson
- (Estonia) J Zopp
1
4

(Australia) J Thompson
(Estonia) J Zopp
7
6^{5}
[12]

1
(United Kingdom) K Skupski
(United Kingdom) N Skupski
4
6
[10]

- (India) R Ramanathan
- (France) M Teixeira
5
6
[8]

- (Japan) Y Nishioka
- (Bosnia and Herzegovina) A Šetkić
6
3
[6]

(Netherlands) S Arends
(Italy) A Motti
7
3
[10]

- (Netherlands) S Arends
- (Italy) A Motti
3
3

(France) D Guez
(France) A Sidorenko
6
6

(France) D Guez
(France) A Sidorenko
6
6

4
- (Italy) A Arnaboldi
- (Romania) A Ungur
2
0

- (France) D Guez
- (France) A Sidorenko
5
6
[7]

(Japan) Y Nishioka
(Bosnia and Herzegovina) A Šetkić
4
6
[10]

(Japan) Y Nishioka
(Bosnia and Herzegovina) A Šetkić
7
4
[10]

- (Russia) K Khachanov
- (Russia) A Rublev
6
4
[5]

(Japan) Y Nishioka
(Bosnia and Herzegovina) A Šetkić
7
6

- (France) G Barrère
- (France) Q Halys
3
6^{6}

2
- (Sweden) J Brunström
- (Denmark) F Nielsen
5
3

2
(Sweden) J Brunström
(Denmark) F Nielsen
6
7^{8}
