= 2013 Challenger La Manche – Doubles =

Doubles
- 2013 Challenger La Manche

Final
- Champions: (Thailand) Sanchai Ratiwatana (Thailand) Sonchat Ratiwatana
- Runners-up: (Germany) Philipp Marx (Romania) Florin Mergea
- Score: 7–5, 6–4

Events
Singles	Doubles
← 2012 ·	Challenger La Manche	· 2014 →

Laurynas Grigelis and Uladzimir Ignatik were the defending champions, but chose not to compete.
Sanchai Ratiwatana and Sonchat Ratiwatana defeated Philipp Marx and Florin Mergea 7–5, 6–4 in the final to win the title.

== Seeds ==
1. (Germany) Philipp Marx / (Romania) Florin Mergea (final)
2. (Thailand) Sanchai Ratiwatana / (Thailand) Sonchat Ratiwatana (champions)
3. (Australia) Rameez Junaid / (Canada) Adil Shamasdin (first round)
4. (Romania) Andrei Dăescu / (Netherlands) Jesse Huta Galung (quarterfinals)

== Draw ==
=== Key ===
- Q = Qualifier
- WC = Wild card
- LL = Lucky loser
- Alt = Alternate
- SE = Special exempt
- PR = Protected ranking
- ITF = ITF entry
- JE = Junior exempt
- w/o = Walkover
- r = Retired
- d = Defaulted
- SR = Special ranking

=== Draw ===
First round
1	(Germany) P Marx (Romania) F Mergea	5	7	[10]
(France) A Mannarino (France) M Teixeira	7	5	[7]
(Croatia) F Škugor (Montenegro) G Tošić	7^{7}	6
(Italy) A Motti (China) D Wu	6^{3}	2
3	(Australia) R Junaid (Canada) A Shamasdin	3	6^{4}
(Germany) D Meffert (Austria) P Oswald	6	7^{7}
WC	(France) N Devilder (France) A Sidorenko	3	5
(Republic of Ireland) J Cluskey (Spain) A Menéndez Maceiras	6	7
(Croatia) M Draganja (Croatia) N Mektić	w/o
PR	(Germany) A Beck (Germany) J-L Struff
(Czech Republic) J Mertl (Romania) A Ungur	6^{2}	3
4	(Romania) A Dăescu (Netherlands) J Huta Galung	7^{7}	6
(France) J Ouanna (France) N Renavand
WC	(France) Antione Benneteau (France) J Eysseric	w/o
(Ukraine) O Nedovyesov (Ukraine) S Stakhovsky	3	6	[5]
2	(Thailand) Sa Ratiwatana (Thailand) So Ratiwatana	6	2	[10]

Quarterfinals
1	(Germany) P Marx (Romania) F Mergea	6	6
(Croatia) F Škugor (Montenegro) G Tošić	3	2
(Germany) D Meffert (Austria) P Oswald	6	6
(Republic of Ireland) J Cluskey (Spain) A Menéndez Maceiras	4	2
(Croatia) M Draganja (Croatia) N Mektić	6	1	[11]
4	(Romania) A Dăescu (Netherlands) J Huta Galung	4	6	[9]
WC	(France) A Benneteau (France) J Eysseric	1	3
2	(Thailand) Sa Ratiwatana (Thailand) So Ratiwatana	6	6

Semifinals
1	(Germany) P Marx (Romania) F Mergea	6	6
(Germany) D Meffert (Austria) P Oswald	4	4
(Croatia) M Draganja (Croatia) N Mektić	7^{7}	6^{4}	[8]
2	(Thailand) Sa Ratiwatana (Thailand) So Ratiwatana	6^{5}	7^{7}	[10]

Final
1	(Germany) P Marx (Romania) F Mergea	5	4
2	(Thailand) Sa Ratiwatana (Thailand) So Ratiwatana	7	6
