= 2014 Challenger La Manche – Doubles =

Doubles
- 2014 Challenger La Manche

Final
- Champions: (Finland) Henri Kontinen (Russia) Konstantin Kravchuk
- Runners-up: (France) Pierre-Hugues Herbert (France) Albano Olivetti
- Score: 6–4, 6–7^{(3–7)}, [10–7]

Events
Singles	Doubles
← 2013 ·	Challenger La Manche	· 2015 →

Sanchai Ratiwatana and Sonchat Ratiwatana were the defending champions, but decided to compete at the ATP Challenger Guangzhou instead.
Henri Kontinen and Konstantin Kravchuk won the title, defeating Pierre-Hugues Herbert and Albano Olivetti in the final, 6–4, 6–7^{(3–7)}, [10–7].

== Seeds ==
1. (Croatia) Marin Draganja / (Croatia) Mate Pavić (semifinals)
2. (United Kingdom) Ken Skupski / (United Kingdom) Neal Skupski (first round)
3. (Australia) Rameez Junaid / (Germany) Philipp Marx (first round)
4. (Germany) Dustin Brown / (United States) Austin Krajicek (quarterfinals)

== Draw ==
=== Key ===
- Q = Qualifier
- WC = Wild card
- LL = Lucky loser
- Alt = Alternate
- SE = Special exempt
- PR = Protected ranking
- ITF = ITF entry
- JE = Junior exempt
- w/o = Walkover
- r = Retired
- d = Defaulted
- SR = Special ranking

=== Draw ===
First round
1	(Croatia) M Draganja (Croatia) M Pavić	7	6
(Slovakia) N Gomboš (Czech Republic) J Mertl	5	4
(Italy) A Arnaboldi (Hungary) M Fucsovics	0	4
(Italy) F Cipolla (Republic of Ireland) J Cluskey	6	6
3	(Australia) R Junaid (Germany) P Marx	5	4
(France) P-H Herbert (France) A Olivetti	7	6
(United States) J Cerretani (Canada) A Shamasdin	6	6
(France) G Burquier (France) D Guez	2	3
(France) A Michon (France) M Teixeira	2	4
(Finland) H Kontinen (Russia) K Kravchuk	6	6
(United Kingdom) J Delgado (Australia) P Hanley	4	6	[7]
4	(Germany) D Brown (United States) A Krajicek	6	3	[10]
(France) M Gicquel (Germany) D Meffert	w/o
(United Kingdom) D Evans (United Kingdom) D Rice
(France) K de Schepper (Sweden) A Siljeström	4	6	[10]
2	(United Kingdom) K Skupski (United Kingdom) N Skupski	6	4	[7]

Quarterfinals
1	(Croatia) M Draganja (Croatia) M Pavić	6	6
(Italy) F Cipolla (Republic of Ireland) J Cluskey	2	3
(France) P-H Herbert (France) A Olivetti	4	6	[17]
(United States) J Cerretani (Canada) A Shamasdin	6	4	[15]
(Finland) H Kontinen (Russia) K Kravchuk	6	6
4	(Germany) D Brown (United States) A Krajicek	4	2
(France) M Gicquel (Germany) D Meffert	7	7
(France) K de Schepper (Sweden) A Siljeström	5	5

Semifinals
1	(Croatia) M Draganja (Croatia) M Pavić	3	6^{3}
(France) P-H Herbert (France) A Olivetti	6	7^{7}
(Finland) H Kontinen (Russia) K Kravchuk	6^{8}	6	[10]
(France) M Gicquel (Germany) D Meffert	7^{10}	4	[6]

Final
(France) P-H Herbert (France) A Olivetti	4	7^{7}	[7]
(Finland) H Kontinen (Russia) K Kravchuk	6	6^{3}	[10]
