= 2015 Challenger La Manche =

- Date: 23 February – 1 March
- Edition: 22nd
- Draw: 32S / 16D
- Prize money: €42,500+H
- Surface: Hard (indoor)
- Location: Cherbourg, France

Champions

Singles
- (Slovakia) Norbert Gombos

Doubles
- (Germany) Andreas Beck / (Czech Republic) Jan Mertl
← 2014 ·	Challenger La Manche	· 2016 →

The 2015 Challenger La Manche was a professional tennis tournament played on indoor hard courts. It was the 22nd edition of the tournament which was part of the 2015 ATP Challenger Tour. It took place in Cherbourg, France between 23 February and 1 March.

== Singles main-draw entrants ==
=== Seeds ===
Country	Player	Rank^{1}	Seed
FRA	Kenny de Schepper	103	1
BEL	Steve Darcis	115	2
GER	Andreas Beck	117	3
UZB	Farrukh Dustov	118	4
FRA	Nicolas Mahut	119	5
FRA	Benoît Paire	121	6
SVK	Norbert Gombos	124	7
BEL	Niels Desein	155	8

- Rankings are as of 16 February 2015.

=== Other entrants ===
The following players received wildcards into the singles main draw:

- (France) Enzo Couacaud
- (France) Jonathan Eysseric
- (France) Benoît Paire
- (France) Alexandre Sidorenko

The following player received special exempt into the singles main draw:

- (Bosnia and Herzegovina) Mirza Bašić

The following player received entry as an alternate:

- (United Kingdom) Liam Broady

The following players received entry from the qualifying draw:

- (Belarus) Sergey Betov
- (Germany) Daniel Brands
- (Italy) Federico Gaio
- (France) Maxime Teixeira

== Champions ==
=== Singles ===
- (Slovakia) Norbert Gombos def. (France) Benoît Paire, 6–1, 7–6^{(7–4)}

=== Doubles ===
- (Germany) Andreas Beck / (Czech Republic) Jan Mertl def. (Australia) Rameez Junaid / (Canada) Adil Shamasdin, 6–2, 3–6, [10–3]
