= 2018 Challenger La Manche =

- Date: 12–18 February
- Edition: 25th
- Draw: 32S / 16D
- Surface: Hard (indoor)
- Location: Cherbourg, France

Champions

Singles
- (Germany) Maximilian Marterer

Doubles
- (Monaco) Romain Arneodo / (Austria) Tristan-Samuel Weissborn
← 2017 ·	Challenger La Manche	· 2019 →

The 2018 Challenger La Manche was a professional tennis tournament played on indoor hard courts. It was the 25th edition of the tournament which was part of the 2018 ATP Challenger Tour. It took place in Cherbourg, France between 12 and 18 February 2018.

== Singles main-draw entrants ==
=== Seeds ===
Country	Player	Rank^{1}	Seed
FRA	Gilles Simon	64	1
GER	Maximilian Marterer	82	2
TUN	Malek Jaziri	110	3
ITA	Matteo Berrettini	127	4
GER	Oscar Otte	136	5
SVK	Norbert Gombos	137	6
FRA	Kenny de Schepper	146	7
FRA	Calvin Hemery	148	8

- ^{1} Rankings are as of 5 February 2018.

=== Other entrants ===
The following players received wildcards into the singles main draw:

- (France) Geoffrey Blancaneaux
- (France) Corentin Denolly
- (France) Antoine Hoang
- (France) Constant Lestienne

The following player received entry into the singles main draw as an alternate:

- (Tunisia) Malek Jaziri

The following players received entry from the qualifying draw:

- (France) Rémi Boutillier
- (United Kingdom) Jay Clarke
- (Australia) Alexei Popyrin
- (Sweden) Mikael Ymer

The following player received entry as a lucky loser:

- (France) Maxime Tabatruong

== Champions ==
=== Singles ===
- (Germany) Maximilian Marterer def. (France) Constant Lestienne 6–4, 7–5.

=== Doubles ===
- (Monaco) Romain Arneodo / (Austria) Tristan-Samuel Weissborn def. (Croatia) Antonio Šančić / (United Kingdom) Ken Skupski 6–3, 1–6, [10–4].
