= 2017 Challenger La Manche =

- Date: 13–19 February
- Edition: 24th
- Draw: 32S / 16D
- Prize money: €42,500+H
- Surface: Hard (indoor)
- Location: Cherbourg, France

Champions

Singles
- (France) Mathias Bourgue

Doubles
- (Czech Republic) Roman Jebavý / (Slovakia) Igor Zelenay
← 2016 ·	Challenger La Manche	· 2018 →

The 2017 Challenger La Manche was a professional tennis tournament played on indoor hard courts. It was the 24th edition of the tournament which is part of the 2017 ATP Challenger Tour. It took place in Cherbourg, France between 13 and 19 February.

== Singles main-draw entrants ==
=== Seeds ===
Country	Player	Rank^{1}	Seed
FRA	Jérémy Chardy	68	1
UKR	Illya Marchenko	91	2
FRA	Julien Benneteau	128	3
SVK	Norbert Gombos	133	4
KOR	Lee Duck-hee	136	5
GER	Peter Gojowczyk	146	6
ITA	Luca Vanni	148	7
BLR	Uladzimir Ignatik	149	4

- ^{1} Rankings are as of February 6, 2017.

=== Other entrants ===
The following players received wildcards into the singles main draw:

- (France) Geoffrey Blancaneaux
- (France) Maxime Janvier
- (France) Axel Michon
- (France) Alexandre Sidorenko

The following player received entry into the singles main draw as a special exemption:

- (United Kingdom) Edward Corrie

The following players received entry from the qualifying draw:

- (Serbia) Filip Krajinović
- (Germany) Daniel Masur
- (France) Corentin Moutet
- (France) Hugo Nys

== Champions ==
=== Singles ===
- (France) Mathias Bourgue def. (Germany) Maximilian Marterer 6–3, 7–6^{(7–3)}.

=== Doubles ===
- (Czech Republic) Roman Jebavý / (Slovakia) Igor Zelenay def. (Croatia) Dino Marcan / (Austria) Tristan-Samuel Weissborn 7–6^{(7–4)}, 6–7^{(4–7)}, [10–6].
