= 2015 Challenger La Manche – Doubles =

Doubles
- 2015 Challenger La Manche

Final
- Champions: (Germany) Andreas Beck (Czech Republic) Jan Mertl
- Runners-up: (Australia) Rameez Junaid (Canada) Adil Shamasdin
- Score: 6–2, 3–6, [10–3]

Events
Singles	Doubles
← 2014 ·	Challenger La Manche	· 2016 →

Henri Kontinen and Konstantin Kravchuk were the defending champions, but chose not to participate.
Andreas Beck and Jan Mertl won the title, defeating Rameez Junaid and Adil Shamasdin in the final, 6–2, 3–6, [10–3].

== Seeds ==
1. (Australia) Rameez Junaid / (Canada) Adil Shamasdin (final)
2. (Germany) Martin Emmrich / (Sweden) Andreas Siljeström (first round)
3. (Belarus) Sergey Betov / (Russia) Konstantin Kravchuk (first round)
4. (United Kingdom) Ken Skupski / (United Kingdom) Neal Skupski (quarterfinals)

== Draw ==
=== Key ===
- Q = Qualifier
- WC = Wild card
- LL = Lucky loser
- Alt = Alternate
- SE = Special exempt
- PR = Protected ranking
- ITF = ITF entry
- JE = Junior exempt
- w/o = Walkover
- r = Retired
- d = Defaulted
- SR = Special ranking

First round
1	(Australia) R Junaid (Canada) A Shamasdin	1	7	[10]
(Czech Republic) R Jebavý (Slovakia) I Zelenay	6	5	[3]
(Italy) F Cipolla (Germany) D Meffert	6	2	[6]
WC	(France) T Lamasine (France) L Lokoli	2	6	[10]
3	(Belarus) S Betov (Russia) K Kravchuk	6^{3}	6	[8]
(New Zealand) M Daniell (France) K de Schepper	7^{7}	1	[10]
WC	(France) H Nys (France) A Sidorenko	4	2
(Netherlands) W Koolhof (Netherlands) M Middelkoop	6	6
(France) A Michon (France) M Teixeira	w/o
(Italy) A Arnaboldi (Uzbekistan) F Dustov
(Belgium) M Authom (Belgium) N Desein	2	4
4	(United Kingdom) K Skupski (United Kingdom) N Skupski	6	6
(Republic of Ireland) J Cluskey (Denmark) F Nielsen	4	2
(Germany) A Beck (Czech Republic) J Mertl	6	6
(Slovakia) N Gombos (Slovakia) A Martin	6	6
2	(Germany) M Emmrich (Sweden) A Siljeström	4	4

Quarterfinals
1	(Australia) R Junaid (Canada) A Shamasdin	6	6
WC	(France) T Lamasine (France) L Lokoli	2	4
(New Zealand) M Daniell (France) K de Schepper	7	6^{10}	[10]
(Netherlands) W Koolhof (Netherlands) M Middelkoop	6^{4}	7^{12}	[3]
(France) A Michon (France) M Teixeira	7^{7}	7^{7}
4	(United Kingdom) K Skupski (United Kingdom) N Skupski	6^{5}	6^{1}
(Germany) A Beck (Czech Republic) J Mertl	6	6
(Slovakia) N Gombos (Slovakia) A Martin	2	4

Semifinals
1	(Australia) R Junaid (Canada) A Shamasdin	6	6
(New Zealand) M Daniell (France) K de Schepper	1	1
(France) A Michon (France) M Teixeira	7	6^{5}	[12]
(Germany) A Beck (Czech Republic) J Mertl	5	7^{7}	[14]

Final
1	(Australia) R Junaid (Canada) A Shamasdin	2	6	[3]
(Germany) A Beck (Czech Republic) J Mertl	6	3	[10]
