= 2013 Challenger La Manche – Singles =

Singles
- 2013 Challenger La Manche

Final
- Champion: (Netherlands) Jesse Huta Galung
- Runner-up: (France) Vincent Millot
- Score: 6–1, 6–3

Events
Singles	Doubles
← 2012 ·	Challenger La Manche	· 2014 →

Josselin Ouanna was the defending champion, but withdrew from the tournament due to illness.
Jesse Huta Galung defeated Vincent Millot 6–1, 6–3 in the final to win the title.

== Seeds ==
1. (Luxembourg) Gilles Müller (first round)
2. (Ukraine) Sergiy Stakhovsky (semifinals)
3. (Romania) Adrian Ungur (second round)
4. (France) Kenny de Schepper (semifinals)
5. (France) Josselin Ouanna (withdrew because of illness)
6. (Germany) Jan-Lennard Struff (first round)
7. (France) Marc Gicquel (quarterfinals)
8. (Belarus) Uladzimir Ignatik (first round)

== Draw ==
=== Key ===
- Q = Qualifier
- WC = Wild card
- LL = Lucky loser
- Alt = Alternate
- SE = Special exempt
- PR = Protected ranking
- ITF = ITF entry
- JE = Junior exempt
- w/o = Walkover
- r = Retired
- d = Defaulted
- SR = Special ranking

=== Finals ===
Semifinals
(France) Vincent Millot	6	2	6
4	(France) Kenny de Schepper	3	6	3
LL	(Netherlands) Jesse Huta Galung	7^{7}	6
2	(Ukraine) Sergiy Stakhovsky	6^{4}	1

Final
(France) Vincent Millot	1	3
LL	(Netherlands) Jesse Huta Galung	6	6

=== Top half ===
First round
1	(Luxembourg) G Müller	6^{9}	6^{8}
WC	(France) A Michon	7^{11}	7^{10}
(France) V Millot	5	6	7
(United Kingdom) J Baker	7	4	5
WC	(France) Jules Marie	0	3
(China) D Wu	6	6
(Belgium) Y Mertens	7	3	4
LL	(France) J Eysseric	5	6	6
4	(France) K de Schepper	5	6	6
(Slovakia) P Červenák	7	1	4
Q	(France) C Lestienne	2	4
WC	(France) A Sidorenko	6	6
Q	(Hungary) M Fucsovics	7^{9}	4
(Ukraine) O Nedovyesov	6^{7}	2^{r}
(Germany) D Meffert	5	7^{8}	6
6	(Germany) J-L Struff	7	6^{6}	4

Second round
WC	(France) A Michon	1	4
(France) V Millot	6	6
(China) D Wu	6	7^{7}
LL	(France) J Eysseric	4	6^{3}
4	(France) K de Schepper	6	6
WC	(France) A Sidorenko	2	3
Q	(Hungary) M Fucsovics	6	6^{8}	7
(Germany) D Meffert	4	7^{10}	5

Quarterfinals
(France) V Millot	6	6
(China) D Wu	2	0
4	(France) K de Schepper	6	6^{1}	7
Q	(Hungary) M Fucsovics	2	7^{7}	5

Semifinals
(France) V Millot	6	2	6
4	(France) K de Schepper	3	6	3

=== Bottom half ===
First round
8	(Belarus) U Ignatik	2	4
(France) A Mannarino	6	6
(Spain) A Menéndez Maceiras	2	6	4
(Czech Republic) J Mertl	6	3	6
LL	(Austria) P Oswald	4	0^{r}
LL	(Netherlands) J Huta Galung	6	2
Q	(Switzerland) H Laaksonen	5	2
3	(Romania) A Ungur	7	6
7	(France) M Gicquel	6	6
WC	(France) D Guez	2	3
(France) N Devilder	1	1
(Germany) P Gojowczyk	6	6
(France) N Mahut	6	7^{9}
(France) M Teixeira	4	6^{7}
(Bosnia and Herzegovina) D Džumhur	6^{5}	2
2	(Ukraine) S Stakhovsky	7^{7}	6

Second round
(France) A Mannarino	6^{2}	6	2
(Czech Republic) J Mertl	7^{7}	4	6
LL	(Netherlands) J Huta Galung	5	7^{7}	7
3	(Romania) A Ungur	7	6^{4}	5
7	(France) M Gicquel	6	3	7^{7}
(Germany) P Gojowczyk	2	6	6^{2}
(France) N Mahut	5	0^{r}
2	(Ukraine) S Stakhovsky	7	3

Quarterfinals
(Czech Republic) J Mertl	4	4
LL	(Netherlands) J Huta Galung	6	6
7	(France) M Gicquel	6	1	6^{3}
2	(Ukraine) S Stakhovsky	3	6	7^{7}

Semifinals
LL	(Netherlands) J Huta Galung	7^{7}	6
2	(Ukraine) S Stakhovsky	6^{4}	1
