= Mathias Bourgue =

French tennis player (born 1994)

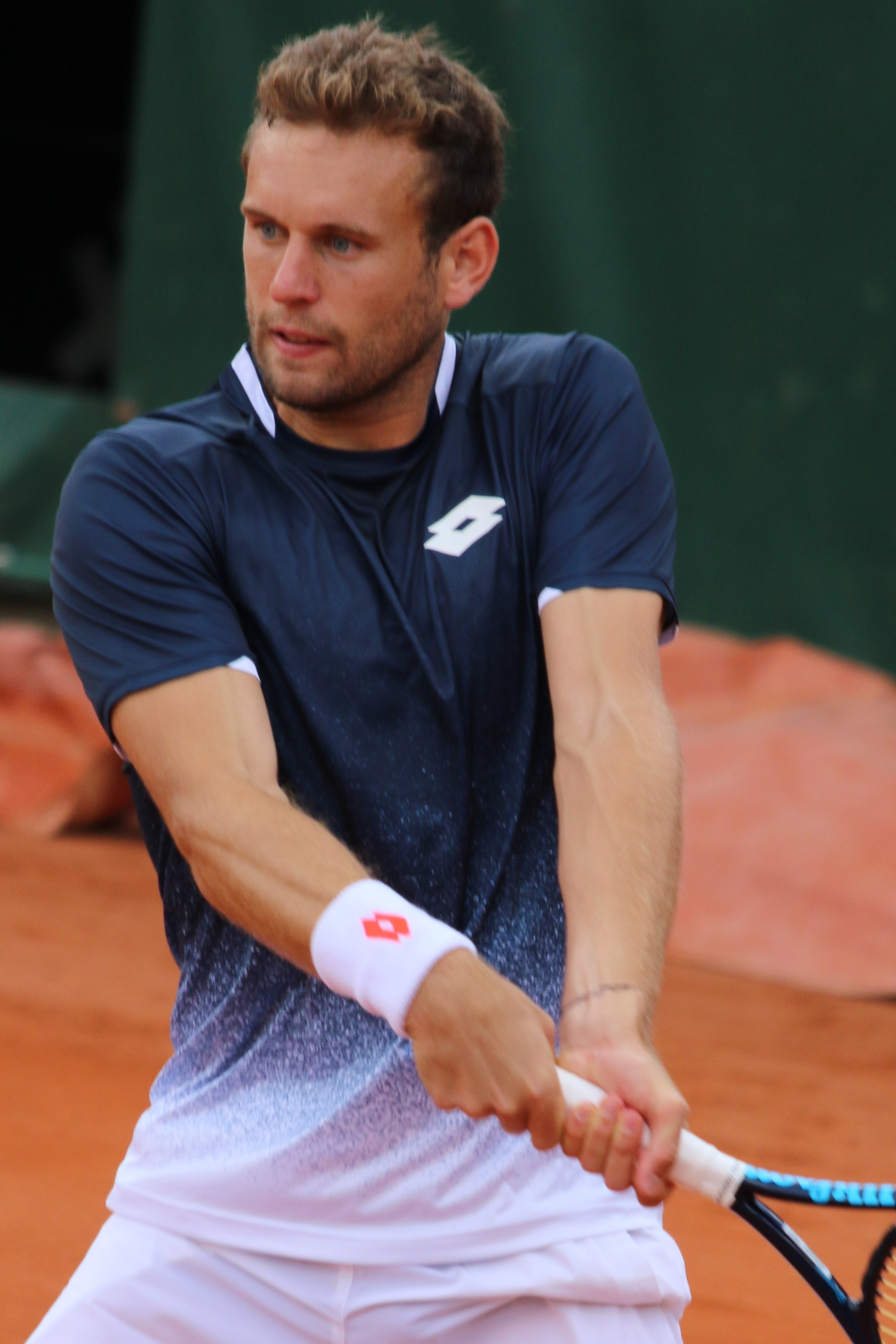
- Bourgue at the 2019 French Open
- Country (sports): France
- Residence: France
- Born: 18 January 1994 (age 32) Avignon, France
- Height: 1.88 m (6 ft 2 in)
- Turned pro: 2011
- Retired: 2025
- Plays: Right-handed (two-handed backhand)
- Coach: Marc Gicquel
- Prize money: US $922,869

Singles
- Career record: 1–5
- Career titles: 0
- Highest ranking: No. 140 (24 April 2017)

Grand Slam singles results
- Australian Open: Q3 (2018, 2020, 2021)
- French Open: 2R (2016)
- Wimbledon: Q2 (2015, 2016, 2017)
- US Open: Q3 (2015)

Doubles
- Career record: 0–6
- Career titles: 0
- Highest ranking: No. 727 (17 May 2021)

Grand Slam doubles results
- French Open: 1R (2014, 2017, 2019, 2021)

Mathias Bourgue (French pronunciation: [matjas buʁɡ]; born 18 January 1994) is a French former professional tennis player. He has a career-high ATP singles ranking of No. 140 achieved on 24 April 2017 and a doubles ranking of No. 727 achieved on 17 May 2021.

== Career ==
Bourgue received a wildcard to advance to the singles main draw in the 2016 French Open, where he reached the second round defeating Jordi Samper Montaña, before losing to world No. 2 Andy Murray in five sets.

He also received a wildcard for the qualifying competition at the 2024 French Open, where he failed to qualifying, losing in the final round to Zizou Bergs.

Bourgue retired from professional tennis in December 2025.

== Performance timeline ==
Key
| W | F | SF | QF | #R | RR | Q# | P# | DNQ | A | Z# | PO | G | S | B | NMS | NTI | P | NH |

(W) winner; (F) finalist; (SF) semifinalist; (QF) quarterfinalist; (#R) rounds 4, 3, 2, 1; (RR) round-robin stage; (Q#) qualification round; (P#) preliminary round; (DNQ) did not qualify; (A) absent; (Z#) Davis/Fed Cup Zonal Group (with number indication) or (PO) play-off; (G) gold, (S) silver or (B) bronze Olympic/Paralympic medal; (NMS) not a Masters tournament; (NTI) not a Tier I tournament; (P) postponed; (NH) not held; (SR) strike rate (events won / competed); (W–L) win–loss record.
To avoid confusion and double counting, these charts are updated at the conclusion of a tournament or when the player's participation has ended.

=== Singles ===
Current after the 2024 French Open

| Tournament | 2013 | 2014 | 2015 | 2016 | 2017 | 2018 | 2019 | 2020 | 2021 | 2022 | 2023 | 2024 | SR | W–L | Win% |
|---|---|---|---|---|---|---|---|---|---|---|---|---|---|---|---|
Grand Slam Tournaments
| Australian Open | A | A | Q1 | Q1 | Q2 | Q3 | A | Q3 | Q3 | Q1 | A | A | 0 / 0 | 0–0 | – |
| French Open | Q2 | Q3 | Q1 | 2R | 1R | A | Q3 | Q1 | 1R | A | A | Q3 | 0 / 3 | 1–3 | 25% |
| Wimbledon | A | A | Q2 | Q2 | Q2 | A | A | NH | Q1 | A | A | | 0 / 0 | 0–0 | – |
| US Open | A | Q1 | Q3 | Q1 | A | A | A | A | Q1 | A | A | | 0 / 0 | 0–0 | – |
| Win–loss | 0–0 | 0–0 | 0–0 | 1–1 | 0–1 | 0–0 | 0–0 | 0–0 | 0–0 | 0–0 | 0–0 | 0–0 | 0 / 3 | 1–3 | 25% |
ATP Masters 1000
| Indian Wells Open | A | A | A | A | A | A | A | NH | A | A | A | A | 0 / 0 | 0–0 | – |
| Miami Open | A | A | A | A | Q2 | A | A | NH | A | A | A | A | 0 / 0 | 0–0 | – |
| Monte-Carlo Masters | A | A | A | A | A | A | A | NH | A | A | A | A | 0 / 0 | 0–0 | – |
| Madrid Open | A | A | A | A | A | A | A | NH | A | A | A | A | 0 / 0 | 0–0 | – |
| Italian Open | A | A | A | A | A | A | A | A | A | A | A | A | 0 / 0 | 0–0 | – |
| Canadian Open | A | A | A | A | A | A | A | NH | A | A | A | | 0 / 0 | 0–0 | – |
| Cincinnati Open | A | A | A | A | A | A | A | A | A | A | A | | 0 / 0 | 0–0 | – |
| Shanghai Masters | A | A | A | A | A | A | A | NH | | | A | | 0 / 0 | 0–0 | – |
| Paris Masters | A | A | A | A | A | A | A | A | A | A | A | | 0 / 0 | 0–0 | – |
| Win–loss | 0–0 | 0–0 | 0–0 | 0–0 | 0–0 | 0–0 | 0–0 | 0–0 | 0–0 | 0–0 | 0–0 | 0–0 | 0 / 0 | 0–0 | – |

== Challenger and Futures finals ==
=== Singles: 25 (13-12) ===
| Legend (singles) ATP Challenger Tour (2–5) ITF Futures Tour (11-7) | Titles by surface Hard (3–4) Clay (10-8) Grass (0–0) Carpet (0–0) |

| Result | W–L | Date | Tournament | Tier | Surface | Opponent | Score |
|---|---|---|---|---|---|---|---|
| Loss | 0-1 | Nov 2012 | Mexico F13, Mérida | Futures | Hard | (France) Lucas Pouille | 4-6, 1-6 |
| Loss | 0-2 | Feb 2013 | Turkey F5, Antalya | Futures | Hard | (Germany) Steven Moneke | 2-6, 3-6 |
| Loss | 0-3 | Apr 2013 | Vietnam F3, Ho Chi Minh City | Futures | Hard | (France) Lucas Pouille | 6–7^{(4–7)}, 2–6 |
| Loss | 0-4 | Jun 2013 | Bulgaria F4, Burgas | Futures | Clay | (Bulgaria) Tihomir Grozdanov | 4–6, 6–3, 2–6 |
| Win | 1-4 | Sep 2013 | Egypt F25, Sharm El Sheikh | Futures | Clay | (Egypt) Karim-Mohamed Maamoun | 6-4, 6-2 |
| Win | 2-4 | Jun 2014 | Croatia F13, Bol | Futures | Clay | (Argentina) Tomás Lipovšek Puches | 6–2, 7–6^{(7–2)} |
| Win | 3–4 | Jun 2014 | Romania F4, Cluj-Napoca | Futures | Clay | (Italy) Marco Bortolotti | 6–2, 6–1 |
| Win | 4-4 | Jun 2014 | Bulgaria F3, Stara Zagora | Futures | Clay | (Bulgaria) Aleksandar Lazov | 6-4, 6-3 |
| Win | 5-4 | Jul 2014 | Bulgaria F5, Plovdiv | Futures | Clay | (Italy) Edoardo Eremin | 6-4, 6-3 |
| Win | 6-4 | Jul 2014 | Bulgaria F6, Blagoevgrad | Futures | Clay | (France) Maxime Hamou | 6-1, 6-4 |
| Win | 7–4 | Jul 2014 | Romania F9, Pitești | Futures | Clay | (Italy) Claudio Fortuna | 6-0, 1-0 Ret. |
| Win | 8-4 | Dec 2014 | Iran F12, Kish Island | Futures | Clay | (Croatia) Toni Androić | 6–4, 3–6, 6–1 |
| Win | 9-4 | Feb 2015 | Tunisia F5, Port El Kantaoui | Futures | Hard | (Belgium) Arthur De Greef | 2–6, 6–4, 7–6^{(10–8)} |
| Loss | 9-5 | Mar 2015 | Croatia F5, Pula | Futures | Clay | (Italy) Riccardo Bellotti | 5-7, 4-6 |
| Loss | 9-6 | Mar 2015 | Croatia F6, Rovinj | Futures | Clay | (Czech Republic) Dušan Lojda | 6–7^{(7–9)}, 6–1, 4–6 |
| Loss | 9-7 | Apr 2015 | France F8, Angers | Futures | Clay | (France) Jonathan Eysseric | 3–6, 6–7^{(2–7)} |
| Win | 10–7 | Jun 2015 | Blois, France | Challenger | Clay | (Spain) Daniel Muñoz de la Nava | 2–6, 6–4, 6–2 |
| Loss | 10-8 | May 2016 | Anning, China | Challenger | Clay | (Australia) Jordan Thompson | 3–6, 2–6 |
| Win | 11-8 | Feb 2017 | Cherbourg, France | Challenger | Hard (i) | (Germany) Maximilian Marterer | 6–3, 7–6^{(7–3)} |
| Loss | 11-9 | Jun 2017 | Lyon | Challenger | Clay | (Canada) Félix Auger-Aliassime | 4-6, 1-6 |
| Win | 12-9 | Mar 2018 | Usa F7, Bakersfield | Futures | Hard | (Germany) Jan Choinski | 6-2, 6-3 |
| Loss | 12-10 | Oct 2019 | Mouilleron-le-Captif, France | Challenger | Hard (i) | (Sweden) Mikael Ymer | 1–6, 4–6 |
| Loss | 12-11 | Sep 2020 | Iași, Romania | Challenger | Clay | (Spain) Carlos Taberner | 4–6, 6–7^{(4–7)} |
| Loss | 12-12 | Apr 2021 | Split, Croatia | Challenger | Clay | (Poland) Kacper Żuk | 4-6, 2-6 |
| Win | 13-12 | May 2023 | M25 Sabadell, Spain | World Tour | Clay | (France) Maxime Chazal | 7–6^{(7–5)}, 6–4 |
