= 2018 Challenger La Manche – Doubles =

Doubles
- 2018 Challenger La Manche

Final
- Champions: (Monaco) Romain Arneodo (Austria) Tristan-Samuel Weissborn
- Runners-up: (Croatia) Antonio Šančić (United Kingdom) Ken Skupski
- Score: 6–3, 1–6, [10–4]

Events
Singles	Doubles
- Challenger La Manche

Roman Jebavý and Igor Zelenay were the defending champions but chose not to defend their title.

Romain Arneodo and Tristan-Samuel Weissborn won the title after defeating Antonio Šančić and Ken Skupski 6–3, 1–6, [10–4] in the final.

== Seeds ==
1. (Croatia) Antonio Šančić / (United Kingdom) Ken Skupski (final)
2. (Monaco) Romain Arneodo / (Austria) Tristan-Samuel Weissborn (champions)
3. (Belgium) Sander Gillé / (Belgium) Joran Vliegen (semifinals)
4. (Russia) Mikhail Elgin / (Sweden) Andreas Siljeström (quarterfinals)

== Draw ==
Key

- Q = Qualifier
- WC = Wild card
- LL = Lucky loser
- Alt = Alternate
- ITF = ITF entry
- PR = Protected ranking
- SR = Special ranking
- SE = Special exempt
- JE = Junior exempt
- JR = Junior Accelerator Programme entrant
- CO = College Accelerator Programme entrant
- NG = Next Gen Accelerator Program entrant
- w/o = Walkover
- r = Retired
- d = Defaulted

First round
1	(Croatia) A Šančić (United Kingdom) K Skupski	4	6	[15]
(United States) N Lammons (United States) A Lawson	6	4	[13]
(Germany) K Krawietz (United Kingdom) J O'Mara	0	4
(Germany) M Moraing (Germany) O Otte	6	6
3	(Belgium) S Gillé (Belgium) J Vliegen	6^{4}	7^{7}	[10]
(Poland) T Bednarek (Poland) G Panfil	7^{7}	6^{4}	[4]
(France) Joffrey de Schepper (France) K de Schepper	5	7^{7}	[8]
(France) G Blancaneaux (France) R Boutillier	7	6^{4}	[10]
(Hungary) G Borsos (Poland) K Majchrzak
(Portugal) G Oliveira (France) G Sakharov	w/o
(Australia) R Junaid (Japan) T Matsui	6^{4}	3
4	(Russia) M Elgin (Sweden) A Siljeström	7^{7}	6
(Spain) J Munar (Spain) C Taberner
(France) B Bonzi (France) C Lestienne	w/o
(Brazil) Caio Silva (Brazil) Thales Turini	3	2
2	(Monaco) R Arneodo (Austria) T-S Weissborn	6	6

Quarterfinals
1	(Croatia) A Šančić (United Kingdom) K Skupski	6	6
(Germany) M Moraing (Germany) O Otte	3	2
3	(Belgium) S Gillé (Belgium) J Vliegen	6^{5}	6	[10]
(France) G Blancaneaux (France) R Boutillier	7^{7}	2	[7]
(Portugal) G Oliveira (France) G Sakharov	6	1	[10]
4	(Russia) M Elgin (Sweden) A Siljeström	3	6	[7]
(France) B Bonzi (France) C Lestienne	6	1	[6]
2	(Monaco) R Arneodo (Austria) T-S Weissborn	3	6	[10]

Semifinals
1	(Croatia) A Šančić (United Kingdom) K Skupski	3	7^{7}	[10]
3	(Belgium) S Gillé (Belgium) J Vliegen	6	6^{4}	[4]
(Portugal) G Oliveira (France) G Sakharov
2	(Monaco) R Arneodo (Austria) T-S Weissborn	w/o

Final
1	(Croatia) A Šančić (United Kingdom) K Skupski	3	6	[4]
2	(Monaco) R Arneodo (Austria) T-S Weissborn	6	1	[10]
