= 2013 Challenger La Manche =

- Date: February 25 – March 3
- Edition: 20th
- Draw: 32S / 16D
- Prize money: €42,500+H
- Surface: Hard (indoor)
- Location: Cherbourg, France

Champions

Singles
- (Netherlands) Jesse Huta Galung

Doubles
- (Thailand) Sanchai Ratiwatana / (Thailand) Sonchat Ratiwatana
- Challenger La Manche

The 2013 Challenger La Manche was a professional tennis tournament played on indoor hard courts. It was the 20th edition of the tournament which was part of the 2013 ATP Challenger Tour. It took place in Cherbourg, France between February 25 and March 3, 2013.

== ATP entrants ==
=== Seeds ===
Country	Player	Rank^{1}	Seed
LUX	Gilles Müller	70	1
UKR	Sergiy Stakhovsky	100	2
ROU	Adrian Ungur	101	3
FRA	Kenny de Schepper	105	4
FRA	Josselin Ouanna	117	5
GER	Jan-Lennard Struff	121	6
FRA	Marc Gicquel	124	7
BLR	Uladzimir Ignatik	143	8

- Rankings are as of February 18, 2013.

=== Other entrants ===
The following players received wildcards into the singles main draw:

- (France) David Guez
- (France) Jules Marie
- (France) Axel Michon
- (France) Alexandre Sidorenko

The following players received entry from the qualifying draw:

- (Germany) Andreas Beck
- (Hungary) Márton Fucsovics
- (Switzerland) Henri Laaksonen
- (France) Constant Lestienne

The following players received entry as lucky losers:

- (France) Jonathan Eysseric
- (Netherlands) Jesse Huta Galung
- (Austria) Philipp Oswald

== Doubles main-draw entrants ==
=== Seeds ===
Country	Player	Country	Player	Rank^{1}	Seed
GER	Philipp Marx	ROU	Florin Mergea	159	1
THA	Sanchai Ratiwatana	THA	Sonchat Ratiwatana	162	2
AUS	Rameez Junaid	CAN	Adil Shamasdin	201	3
ROU	Andrei Dăescu	NED	Jesse Huta Galung	298	4

- ^{1} Rankings as of February 18, 2013.

=== Other entrants ===
The following pairs received wildcards into the doubles main draw:

- (France) Antione Benneteau / (France) Jonathan Eysseric
- (France) Nicolas Devilder / (France) Alexandre Sidorenko

The following pair received entry using a protected ranking:

- (Germany) Andreas Beck / (Germany) Jan-Lennard Struff

== Champions ==
=== Singles ===
- (Netherlands) Jesse Huta Galung def. (France) Vincent Millot, 6–1, 6–3

=== Doubles ===
- (Thailand) Sanchai Ratiwatana / (Thailand) Sonchat Ratiwatana def. (Germany) Philipp Marx / (Romania) Florin Mergea, 7–5, 6–4
