= 2016 Challenger La Manche – Singles =

Singles
- 2016 Challenger La Manche

Final
- Champion: (Australia) Jordan Thompson
- Runner-up: (Czech Republic) Adam Pavlásek
- Score: 4–6, 6–4, 6–1

Events
Singles	Doubles
- Challenger La Manche

Norbert Gombos was the defending champion, but decided not to defend his title.
Jordan Thompson won the title, defeating Adam Pavlásek in the final 4–6, 6–4, 6–1.

== Seeds ==
1. (Serbia) Filip Krajinović (second round)
2. (Japan) Yoshihito Nishioka (second round)
3. (France) Pierre-Hugues Herbert (quarterfinals)
4. (Germany) Daniel Brands (quarterfinals)
5. (Czech Republic) Adam Pavlásek (final)
6. (Australia) Jordan Thompson (champion)
7. (Russia) Karen Khachanov (quarterfinals)
8. (France) Kenny de Schepper (semifinals)

== Draw ==
Key

- Q = Qualifier
- WC = Wild card
- LL = Lucky loser
- Alt = Alternate
- ITF = ITF entry
- PR = Protected ranking
- SR = Special ranking
- SE = Special exempt
- JE = Junior exempt
- JR = Junior Accelerator Programme entrant
- CO = College Accelerator Programme entrant
- NG = Next Gen Accelerator Program entrant
- w/o = Walkover
- r = Retired
- d = Defaulted

=== Finals ===
Semifinals
8	(France) Kenny de Schepper	7	4	2
5	(Czech Republic) Adam Pavlásek	5	6	6
6	(Australia) Jordan Thompson	6	6
(France) Vincent Millot	4	2

Final
5	(Czech Republic) Adam Pavlásek	6	4	1
6	(Australia) Jordan Thompson	4	6	6

=== Top half ===
First round
1	(Serbia) F Krajinović	6	7^{7}
(United Kingdom) D Evans	4	6^{4}
WC	(France) A Olivetti	4	6^{12}
Q	(Denmark) F Nielsen	6	7^{14}
(Austria) D Novak	6	4	3
(Russia) A Rublev	3	6	6
WC	(France) G Barrère	1	6	3
8	(France) K de Schepper	6	3	6
4	(Germany) D Brands	6	7^{11}
(Italy) A Arnaboldi	4	6^{9}
Q	(France) S Doumbia	4	4
(Bosnia and Herzegovina) A Šetkić	6	6
(Switzerland) M Chiudinelli	4	1
(India) R Ramanathan	6	6
SE	(Czech Republic) J Hernych	3	6	3
5	(Czech Republic) A Pavlásek	6	4	6

Second round
1	(Serbia) F Krajinović	3	6^{4}
Q	(Denmark) F Nielsen	6	7^{7}
(Russia) A Rublev	7^{7}	6^{3}	3
8	(France) K de Schepper	6^{4}	7^{7}	6
4	(Germany) D Brands	6^{8}	6	7
(Bosnia and Herzegovina) A Šetkić	7^{10}	3	5
(India) R Ramanathan	4	2
5	(Czech Republic) A Pavlásek	6	6

Quarterfinals
Q	(Denmark) F Nielsen	5	3
8	(France) K de Schepper	7	6
4	(Germany) D Brands	4	6^{5}
5	(Czech Republic) A Pavlásek	6	7^{7}

Semifinals
8	(France) K de Schepper	7	4	2
5	(Czech Republic) A Pavlásek	5	6	6

=== Bottom half ===
First round
6	(Australia) J Thompson	6	6
(Estonia) J Zopp	1	1
WC	(France) C Hemery	4	5
(Switzerland) H Laaksonen	6	7
(France) T Lamasine	6	6
WC	(France) A Sidorenko	2	4
(France) D Guez	6^{2}	4
3	(France) P-H Herbert	7^{7}	6
7	(Russia) K Khachanov	7^{7}	7^{7}
Q	(Belgium) M Authom	6^{2}	6^{4}
Q	(France) M Teixeira	6	6
(Russia) A Karatsev	2	2
(France) V Millot	3	6	7^{7}
(France) Q Halys	6	4	6^{1}
(Romania) A Ungur	6	0	2
2	(Japan) Y Nishioka	1	6	6

Second round
6	(Australia) J Thompson	7^{10}	7
(Switzerland) H Laaksonen	6^{8}	5
(France) T Lamasine	6^{3}	4
3	(France) P-H Herbert	7^{7}	6
7	(Russia) K Khachanov	3	6	6
Q	(France) M Teixeira	6	2	4
(France) V Millot	7	6
2	(Japan) Y Nishioka	5	3

Quarterfinals
6	(Australia) J Thompson	7^{7}	6^{4}	7^{8}
3	(France) P-H Herbert	6^{5}	7^{7}	6^{6}
7	(Russia) K Khachanov	6^{5}	4
(France) V Millot	7^{7}	6

Semifinals
6	(Australia) J Thompson	6	6
(France) V Millot	4	2
