= Félix Auger-Aliassime career statistics =

Career finals
Discipline	Type	Won	Lost	Total
Singles	Grand Slam	–	–	–
Singles	ATP Finals	–	–	–
Singles	ATP 1000	0	2	2
Singles	ATP 500	3	4	7
Singles	ATP 250	6	7	13
Singles	Olympics	–	–	–
Singles	Total	9	13	22
Doubles	Grand Slam	–	–	–
Doubles	ATP Finals	–	–	–
Doubles	ATP 1000	1	0	1
Doubles	ATP 500	0	1	1
Doubles	ATP 250	–	–	–
Doubles	Olympics	–	–	–
Doubles	Total	1	1	2

These are the career statistics for Canadian tennis player Félix Auger-Aliassime. All information is according to the ATP.

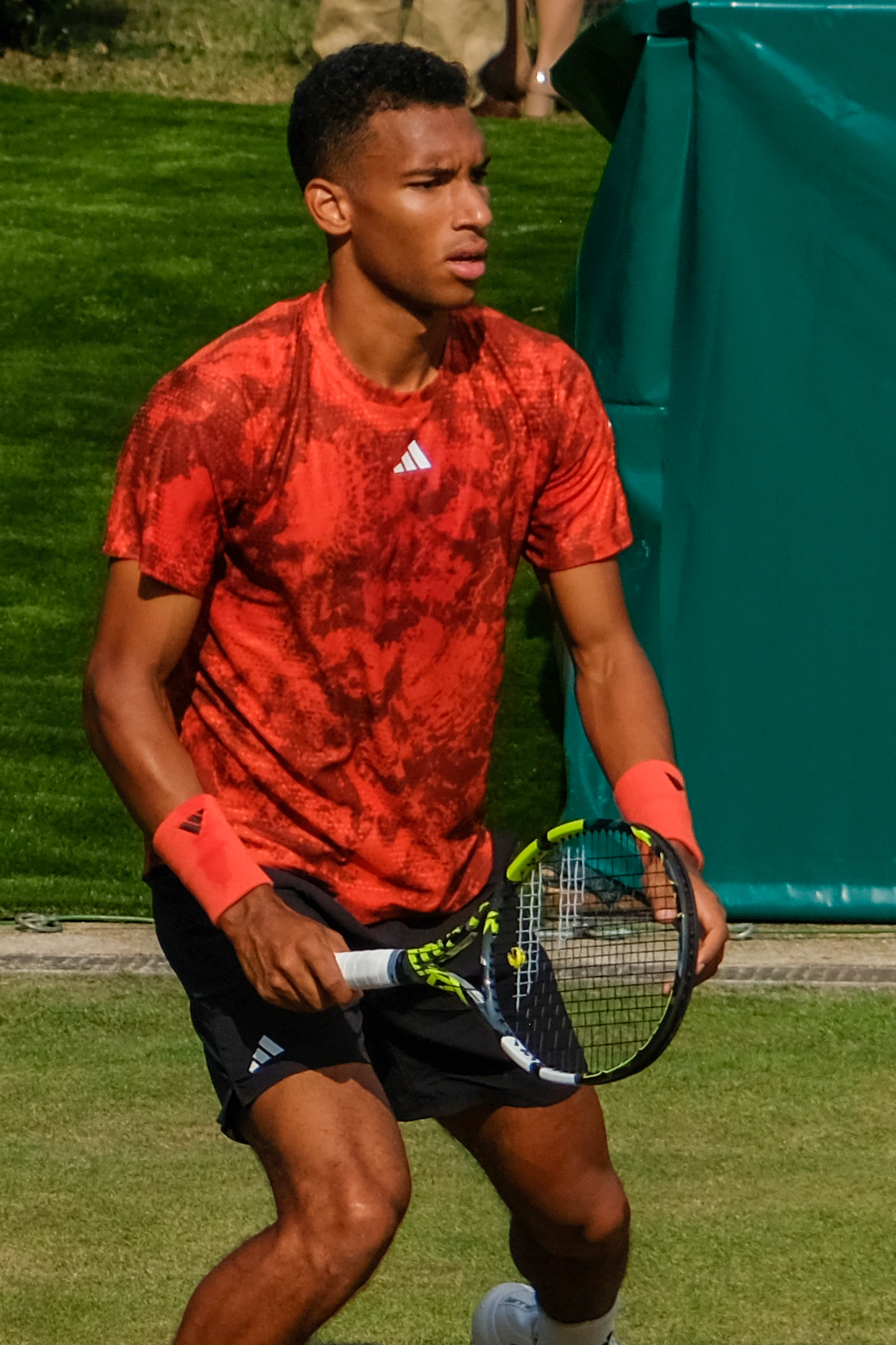
Auger-Aliassime in 2023

== Performance timelines ==
Key
W	F	SF	QF	#R	RR	Q#	P#	DNQ	A	Z#	PO	G	S	B	NMS	NTI	P	NH

(W) winner; (F) finalist; (SF) semifinalist; (QF) quarterfinalist; (#R) rounds 4, 3, 2, 1; (RR) round-robin stage; (Q#) qualification round; (P#) preliminary round; (DNQ) did not qualify; (A) absent; (Z#) Davis/Fed Cup Zonal Group (with number indication) or (PO) play-off; (G) gold, (S) silver or (B) bronze Olympic/Paralympic medal; (NMS) not a Masters tournament; (NTI) not a Tier I tournament; (P) postponed; (NH) not held; (SR) strike rate (events won / competed); (W–L) win–loss record.
To avoid confusion and double counting, these charts are updated at the conclusion of a tournament or when the player's participation has ended.

=== Singles ===
Current through the 2026 ATP Tour.

Tournament	2016	2017	2018	2019	2020	2021	2022	2023	2024	2025	2026	SR	W–L	Win%
Grand Slam tournaments
Australian Open	A	A	A	Q2	1R	4R	QF	4R	3R	2R	1R	0 / 7	13–7	65%
French Open	A	A	Q2	A	1R	1R	4R	1R	4R	1R	QF	0 / 7	10–7	59%
Wimbledon	A	A	A	3R	NH	QF	1R	1R	1R	2R	QF	0 / 7	11–7	61%
US Open	A	Q2	1R	1R	4R	SF	2R	1R	1R	SF	2R	0 / 9	15–9	63%
Win–loss	0–0	0–0	0–1	2–2	3–3	12–4	8–4	3–4	5–4	7–4	9–4	0 / 30	49–30	62%
Year-end championships
ATP Finals	Did not qualify						RR	DNQ		SF	Alt	0 / 2	3–4	43%
National representation
Davis Cup	A	A	A	F	NH	A	W	A	QF	A		1 / 4	11–3	79%
Summer Olympics	A	Not Held				1R	Not Held		4th	Not Held		0 / 2	4–3	57%
ATP 1000 tournaments
Indian Wells Open	A	A	2R	3R	NH	2R	2R	QF	3R	2R	4R	0 / 8	9–8	53%
Miami Open	A	A	Q1	SF	NH	3R	2R	3R	2R	3R	3R	0 / 7	10–7	59%
Monte-Carlo Masters	A	A	1R	2R	NH	1R	2R	A	2R	1R	QF	0 / 7	4–7	36%
Madrid Open	A	A	A	2R	NH	1R	QF	2R	F (Note: Withdraw during the tournament. Not counted as a loss.)	2R	3R	0 / 7	9–7	56%
Italian Open	A	A	A	1R	1R	3R	QF	2R	3R	A	2R	0 / 7	5–7	42%
Canadian Open	Q1	A	2R	3R	NH	2R	QF	1R	1R	2R	A	0 / 7	5–7	42%
Cincinnati Open	A	A	A	1R	2R	QF	QF	2R	3R	QF	4R	0 / 8	14–8	64%
Shanghai Masters	A	A	A	2R	Not Held			2R	2R	QF	4R	0 / 5	6–5	55%
Paris Masters	A	A	A	A	1R	2R	SF	2R	A	F	A	0 / 5	10–5	67%
Win–loss	0–0	0–0	2–3	12–8	1–3	7–8	11–8	6–8	11–8	12–8	10–7	0 / 61	72–61	54%
Career statistics
	2016	2017	2018	2019	2020	2021	2022	2023	2024	2025	2026	SR	W–L	Win%
Tournaments	0	0	10	21	16	23	26	21	24	25	18	Career total: 184		
Titles	0	0	0	0	0	0	4	1	0	3	1	Career total: 9		
Finals	0	0	0	3	3	2	5	1	1	5	2	Career total: 22		
Hardcourt win–loss	0–0	0–0	4–7	12–11	22–16	24–15	45–16	22–15	15–15	41–15	22–10	9 / 115	207–120	63%
Clay win–loss	0–0	0–0	2–3	13–9	1–3	4–6	11–7	1–3	17–8	3–5	8–5	0 / 49	60–49	55%
Grass win–loss	0–0	0–0	0–0	8–3	0–0	10–3	4–4	0–1	0–2	6–4	7–3	0 / 20	35–20	62%
Overall win–loss	0–0	0–0	6–10	33–23	23–19	38–24	60–27	23–19	32–25	50–24	37–18	9 / 184	302–189	62%
Win %	–	–	38%	59%	55%	61%	69%	55%	56%	68%	67%	62%		
Year-end ranking	601	162	108	21	21	11	6	29	29	5		$24,782,349		

=== Doubles ===
Tournament	2016	2017	2018	2019	2020	2021	2022	2023	2024	2025	2026	SR	W–L	Win%
Grand Slam tournaments
Australian Open	A	A	A	A	A	1R	A	A	A	A	A	0 / 1	0–1	0%
French Open	A	A	A	A	A	A	A	A	A	A	A	0 / 0	0–0	–
Wimbledon	A	A	A	A	NH	A	A	A	A	A	A	0 / 0	0–0	–
US Open	A	A	A	A	A	A	A	A	A	A	A	0 / 0	0–0	–
Win–loss	0–0	0–0	0–0	0–0	0–0	0–1	0–0	0–0	0–0	0–0	0–0	0 / 1	0–1	0%
National representation
Davis Cup	A	A	A	F	NH	A	W	A	QF	A		1 / 4	4–2	67%
Summer Olympics	A	Not Held				A	Not Held		1R	Not Held		0 / 1	0–1	0%
ATP 1000 tournaments
Indian Wells Open	A	A	A	A	NH	1R	A	QF	1R	A	2R	0 / 4	2–4	33%
Miami Open	A	A	A	A	NH	2R	A	A	A	A	A	0 / 1	1–1	50%
Monte-Carlo Masters	A	A	A	A	NH	2R	1R	A	A	A	A	0 / 2	1–2	33%
Madrid Open	A	A	A	A	NH	1R	2R	QF	A	A	A	0 / 3	3–2	60%
Italian Open	A	A	A	A	2R	A	A	A	1R	A	A	0 / 2	1–2	33%
Canadian Open	1R	A	1R	1R	NH	1R	A	A	1R	A	A	0 / 5	0–5	0%
Cincinnati Open	A	A	A	1R	2R	1R	A	1R	A	A	A	0 / 4	1–3	25%
Shanghai Masters	A	A	A	2R	Not Held			1R	A	1R		0 / 3	1–2	33%
Paris Masters	A	A	A	A	W	A	A	2R	A	A		1 / 2	6–0	100%
Win–loss	0–1	0–0	0–1	1–2	7–1	2–6	1–1	4–4	0–3	0–1	1–1	1 / 26	16–21	43%
Career statistics
	2016	2017	2018	2019	2020	2021	2022	2023	2024	2025	2026	SR	W–L	Win%
Tournaments	1	0	1	5	8	11	5	6	5	2	2	Career total: 46		
Titles	0	0	0	0	1	0	0	0	0	0	0	Career total: 1		
Finals	0	0	0	0	1	1	0	0	0	0	0	Career total: 2		
Overall win–loss	0–1	0–0	0–1	1–5	10–7	7–11	9–5	5–5	1–5	2–2	2–2	37–44		
Win %	0%	–	0%	17%	59%	39%	64%	50%	17%	50%	50%	46%		
Year-end ranking	865	991	370	–	77	132	257	167	–	348				

== Significant finals ==
=== ATP 1000 tournaments ===
==== Singles: 2 (2 runner-ups) ====
Result	Year	Tournament	Surface	Opponent	Score
Loss	2024	Madrid Open	Clay	Andrey Rublev	6–4, 5–7, 5–7
Loss	2025	Paris Masters	Hard (i)	(Italy) Jannik Sinner	4–6, 6–7^{(4–7)}

==== Doubles: 1 (title) ====
Result	Year	Tournament	Surface	Partner	Opponents	Score
Win	2020	Paris Masters	Hard (i)	(Poland) Hubert Hurkacz	(Croatia) Mate Pavić (Brazil) Bruno Soares	6–7^{(3–7)}, 7–6^{(9–7)}, [10–2]

=== Summer Olympics ===
==== Singles: 1 (4th place) ====
Result	Year	Tournament	Surface	Opponent	Score
4th place	2024	Paris Olympics	Clay	(Italy) Lorenzo Musetti	4–6, 6–1, 3–6

==== Mixed doubles: 1 (bronze medal) ====
Result	Year	Tournament	Surface	Partner	Opponents	Score
Bronze	2024	Paris Olympics	Clay	(Canada) Gabriela Dabrowski	(Netherlands) Demi Schuurs (Netherlands) Wesley Koolhof	6–3, 7–6^{(7–2)}

== ATP Tour finals ==
=== Singles: 22 (9 titles, 13 runner-ups) ===
Legend Grand Slam (0–0) ATP Finals (0–0) ATP 1000 (0–2) ATP 500 (3–4) ATP 250 (6–7)	Finals by surface Hard (9–8) Clay (0–3) Grass (0–2)	Finals by setting Outdoor (1–7) Indoor (8–6)

Result	W–L	Date	Tournament	Tier	Surface	Opponent	Score
Loss	0–1	Feb 2019	Rio Open, Brazil	ATP 500	Clay	(Serbia) Laslo Đere	3–6, 5–7
Loss	0–2	May 2019	Lyon Open, France	ATP 250	Clay	(France) Benoît Paire	4–6, 3–6
Loss	0–3	Jun 2019	Stuttgart Open, Germany	ATP 250	Grass	(Italy) Matteo Berrettini	4–6, 6–7^{(11–13)}
Loss	0–4	Feb 2020	Rotterdam Open, Netherlands	ATP 500	Hard (i)	(France) Gaël Monfils	2–6, 4–6
Loss	0–5	Feb 2020	Open 13, France	ATP 250	Hard (i)	(Greece) Stefanos Tsitsipas	3–6, 4–6
Loss	0–6	Oct 2020	Bett1Hulks Indoors, Germany	ATP 250	Hard (i)	(Germany) Alexander Zverev	3–6, 3–6
Loss	0–7	Feb 2021	Murray River Open, Australia	ATP 250	Hard	(United Kingdom) Dan Evans	2–6, 3–6
Loss	0–8	Jun 2021	Stuttgart Open, Germany	ATP 250	Grass	(Croatia) Marin Čilić	6–7^{(2–7)}, 3–6
Win	1–8	Feb 2022	Rotterdam Open, Netherlands	ATP 500	Hard (i)	(Greece) Stefanos Tsitsipas	6–4, 6–2
Loss	1–9	Feb 2022	Open 13, France	ATP 250	Hard (i)	(Russia) Andrey Rublev	5–7, 6–7^{(4–7)}
Win	2–9	Oct 2022	Firenze Open, Italy	ATP 250	Hard (i)	(United States) J. J. Wolf	6–4, 6–4
Win	3–9	Oct 2022	European Open, Belgium	ATP 250	Hard (i)	(United States) Sebastian Korda	6–3, 6–4
Win	4–9	Oct 2022	Swiss Indoors, Switzerland	ATP 500	Hard (i)	(Denmark) Holger Rune	6–3, 7–5
Win	5–9	Oct 2023	Swiss Indoors, Switzerland (2)	ATP 500	Hard (i)	(Poland) Hubert Hurkacz	7–6^{(7–3)}, 7–6^{(7–5)}
Loss	5–10	May 2024	Madrid Open, Spain	ATP 1000	Clay	Andrey Rublev	6–4, 5–7, 5–7
Win	6–10	Jan 2025	Adelaide International, Australia	ATP 250	Hard	(United States) Sebastian Korda	6–3, 3–6, 6–1
Win	7–10	Jan 2025	Open Occitanie, France	ATP 250	Hard (i)	(United States) Aleksandar Kovacevic	6–2, 6–7^{(7–9)}, 7–6^{(7–2)}
Loss	7–11	Feb 2025	Dubai Tennis Championships, UAE	ATP 500	Hard	(Greece) Stefanos Tsitsipas	3–6, 3–6
Win	8–11	Oct 2025	European Open, Belgium (2)	ATP 250	Hard (i)	(Czech Republic) Jiří Lehečka	7–6^{(7–2)}, 6–7^{(6–8)}, 6–2
Loss	8–12	Nov 2025	Paris Masters, France	ATP 1000	Hard (i)	(Italy) Jannik Sinner	4–6, 6–7^{(4–7)}
Win	9–12	Feb 2026	Open Occitanie, France (2)	ATP 250	Hard (i)	(France) Adrian Mannarino	6–3, 7–6^{(7–4)}
Loss	9–13	Feb 2026	Rotterdam Open, Netherlands	ATP 500	Hard (i)	(Australia) Alex de Minaur	3–6, 2–6

=== Doubles: 2 (1 title, 1 runner-up) ===
Legend Grand Slam (–) ATP Finals (–) ATP 1000 (1–0) ATP 500 (0–1) ATP 250 (0–0)	Finals by surface Hard (1–0) Clay (0–0) Grass (0–1)	Finals by setting Outdoor (0–1) Indoor (1–0)

Result	W–L	Date	Tournament	Tier	Surface	Partner	Opponents	Score
Win	1–0	Nov 2020	Paris Masters, France	ATP 1000	Hard (i)	(Poland) Hubert Hurkacz	(Croatia) Mate Pavić (Brazil) Bruno Soares	6–7^{(3–7)}, 7–6^{(9–7)}, [10–2]
Loss	1–1	Jun 2021	Halle Open, Germany	ATP 500	Grass	(Poland) Hubert Hurkacz	(Germany) Kevin Krawietz (Romania) Horia Tecău	6–7^{(4–7)}, 4–6

== ATP Challenger Tour finals ==
=== Singles: 5 (4 titles, 1 runner-up) ===
Finals by surface
Hard (2–0)
Clay (4–3)

Result	W–L	Date	Tournament	Tier	Surface	Opponent	Score
Win	1–0	Jun 2017	Lyon Open, France	Challenger	Clay	(France) Mathias Bourgue	6–4, 6–1
Win	2–0	Sep 2017	Copa Sevilla, Spain	Challenger	Clay	(Spain) Íñigo Cervantes	6–7^{(4–7)}, 6–3, 6–3
Win	3–0	Jun 2018	Lyon Open, France (2)	Challenger	Clay	(France) Johan Tatlot	6–7^{(3–7)}, 7–5, 6–2
Loss	3–1	Jun 2018	Blois International, France	Challenger	Clay	(Netherlands) Scott Griekspoor	4–6, 4–6
Win	4–1	Oct 2018	Tashkent Challenger, Uzbekistan	Challenger	Hard	(Poland) Kamil Majchrzak	6–3, 6–2

=== Doubles: 2 (2 titles) ===
Finals by surface
Hard (1–0)

Result	Date	Tournament	Tier	Surface	Partner	Opponents	Score
Win	Feb 2018	Hungarian Challenger Open, Hungary	Challenger	Hard (i)	(Spain) Nicola Kuhn	(Croatia) Marin Draganja (Croatia) Tomislav Draganja	2–6, 6–2, [11–9]

== ITF Tour finals ==
=== Singles: 4 (2 titles, 2 runner-ups) ===
Finals by surface
Hard (1–0)
Clay (1–2)

Result	W–L	Date	Tournament	Tier	Surface	Opponent	Score
Loss	0–1	May 2016	F12 Lleida, Spain	Futures	Clay	(India) Ramkumar Ramanathan	6–7^{(1–7)}, 2–6
Win	1–1	Nov 2016	F35 Birmingham, US	Futures	Clay	(Colombia) Juan Manuel Benítez Chavarriaga	7–5, 7–5
Loss	1–2	Jan 2017	F3 Plantation, US	Futures	Clay	(Dominican Republic) Roberto Cid Subervi	7–6^{(7–4)}, 6–7^{(3–7)}, 0–6
Win	2–2	Mar 2017	F2 Sherbrooke, Canada	Futures	Hard (i)	(France) Gleb Sakharov	3–6, 6–3, 6–4

=== Doubles: 1 (1 title) ===
Finals by surface
Clay (1–0)

Result	W–L	Date	Tournament	Tier	Surface	Partner	Opponents	Score
Win	1–0	Nov 2016	F36 Niceville, US	Futures	Clay	(United States) Patrick Kypson	(United States) Patrick Daciek (United States) Dane Webb	7–5, 6–1

== Junior Grand Slam finals ==
=== Singles: 2 (1 title, 1 runner-up) ===
Result	Year	Tournament	Surface	Opponent	Score
Loss	2016	French Open	Clay	(France) Geoffrey Blancaneaux	6–1, 3–6, 6–8
Win	2016	US Open	Hard	(Serbia) Miomir Kecmanović	6–3, 6–0

=== Doubles: 3 (1 title, 2 runner-ups) ===
Result	Year	Tournament	Surface	Partner	Opponents	Score
Win	2015	US Open	Hard	(Canada) Denis Shapovalov	(United States) Brandon Holt (United States) Riley Smith	7–5, 7–6^{(7–3)}
Loss	2016	Wimbledon	Grass	(Canada) Denis Shapovalov	(Estonia) Kenneth Raisma (Greece) Stefanos Tsitsipas	6–4, 4–6, 2–6
Loss	2016	US Open	Hard	(Canada) Benjamin Sigouin	(Bolivia) Juan Carlos Aguilar (Brazil) Felipe Meligeni Alves	3–6, 6–7^{(4–7)}

== Career Grand Slam tournament statistics ==
=== Career Grand Slam tournament seedings ===
Year	Australian Open	French Open	Wimbledon	US Open
2017	did not play	did not play	did not play	qualifier
2018	did not play	qualifier	did not play	qualifier
2019	qualifier	did not play	19th	18th
2020	20th	19th	tournament cancelled*	15th
2021	20th	20th	16th	12th
2022	9th	9th	6th	6th
2023	6th	10th	11th	15th
2024	27th	21st	17th	19th
2025	29th	29th	25th	25th
2026	7th	4th	3rd	3rd

* Due to the COVID-19 pandemic, the 2020 Wimbledon Championships of the tournament was cancelled.

=== Best Grand Slam results details ===
Australian Open
2022 Australian Open (9th seed)
Round	Opponent	Rank	Score
1R	(Finland) Emil Ruusuvuori	90	6–4, 0–6, 3–6, 6–3, 6–4
2R	(Spain) Alejandro Davidovich Fokina	50	7–6^{(7–4)}, 6–7^{(4–7)}, 7–6^{(7–5)}, 7–6^{(7–4)}
3R	(United Kingdom) Dan Evans (24)	24	6–4, 6–1, 6–1
4R	(Croatia) Marin Čilić (27)	27	2–6, 7–6^{(9–7)}, 6–2, 7–6^{(7–4)}
QF	(Russia) Daniil Medvedev (2)	2	7–6^{(7–4)}, 6–3, 6–7^{(2–7)}, 5–7, 4–6

French Open
2026 French Open (4th seed)
Round	Opponent	Rank	Score
1R	(Germany) Daniel Altmaier	57	4–6, 6–4, 4–6, 6–1, 7–6^{(10–7)}
2R	(Argentina) Román Andrés Burruchaga	68	4–6, 6–0, 7–5, 6–1
3R	(United States) Brandon Nakashima (31)	35	5–7, 6–1, 7–6^{(7–4)}, 7–6^{(7–1)}
4R	(Chile) Alejandro Tabilo	36	6–3, 7–5, 6–1
QF	(Italy) Flavio Cobolli (10)	14	6–4, 4–6, 4–6, 4–6

Wimbledon Championships
2021 Wimbledon (16th seed)
Round	Opponent	Rank	Score
1R	(Brazil) Thiago Monteiro	81	6–3, 6–3, 6–3
2R	(Sweden) Mikael Ymer	98	6–4, 4–6, 7–6^{(7–4)}, 6–1
3R	(Australia) Nick Kyrgios	60	2–6, 6–1, 0–0 ret.
4R	(Germany) Alexander Zverev (4)	6	6–4, 7–6^{(8–6)}, 3–6, 3–6, 6–4
QF	(Italy) Matteo Berrettini (7)	9	3–6, 7–5, 5–7, 3–6
2026 Wimbledon (3rd seed)
Round	Opponent	Rank	Score
1R	(Kazakhstan) Alexander Shevchenko	99	6–3, 6–1, 6–4
2R	(Croatia) Dino Prižmić	89	7–6^{(7–2)}, 6–3, 7–5
3R	(United States) Michael Zheng (Q)	144	7–6^{(7–1)}, 6–2, 6–1
4R	(Spain) Alejandro Davidovich Fokina (22)	23	6–7^{(4–7)}, 7–6^{(8–6)}, 6–3, 6–7^{(2–7)}, 6–1
QF	(Serbia) Novak Djokovic (7)	8	6–7^{(10–12)}, 6–3, 3–6, 7–6^{(7–4)}, 6–7^{(4–10)}

US Open
2021 US Open (12th seed)
Round	Opponent	Rank	Score
1R	(Russia) Evgeny Donskoy (Q)	152	7–6^{(7–0)}, 3–6, 7–6^{(7–1)}, 7–6^{(10–8)}
2R	(Spain) Bernabé Zapata Miralles (LL)	116	7–6^{(7–5)}, 6–3, 6–2
3R	(Spain) Roberto Bautista Agut (18)	21	6–3, 6–4, 4–6, 3–6, 6–3
4R	(United States) Frances Tiafoe	50	4–6, 6–2, 7–6^{(8–6)}, 6–4
QF	(Spain) Carlos Alcaraz	55	6–3, 3–1 ret.
SF	(Russia) Daniil Medvedev (2)	2	4–6, 5–7, 2–6
2025 US Open (25th seed)
Round	Opponent	Rank	Score
1R	(United Kingdom) Billy Harris (LL)	151	6–4, 7–6^{(10–8)}, 6–4
2R	Roman Safiullin	94	6–1, 7–6^{(7–4)}, 7–6^{(7–5)}
3R	(Germany) Alexander Zverev (3)	3	4–6, 7–6^{(9–7)}, 6–4, 6–4
4R	Andrey Rublev (15)	15	7–5, 6–3, 6–4
QF	(Australia) Alex de Minaur (8)	8	4–6, 7–6^{(9–7)}, 7–5, 7–6^{(7–4)}
SF	(Italy) Jannik Sinner (1)	1	1–6, 6–3, 3–6, 4–6

== Wins over top-10 players ==
- Auger-Aliassime has a 26–50 (34.21%) record against players who were ranked in the top 10 at the time the match was played.

Season	2019	2020	2021	2022	2023	2024	2025	2026	Total
Wins	2	0	4	7	1	4	7	1	26

#	Player	Rk	Event	Surface	Rd	Score	Rk	Ref
2019
1.	(Greece) Stefanos Tsitsipas	10	Indian Wells Open, United States	Hard	2R	6–4, 6–2	58	
2.	(Greece) Stefanos Tsitsipas	6	Queen's Club, United Kingdom	Grass	QF	7–5, 6–2	21	
2021
3.	(Argentina) Diego Schwartzman	10	Italian Open, Italy	Clay	2R	6–1, 6–3	21	
4.	(Switzerland) Roger Federer	8	Halle Open, Germany	Grass	2R	4–6, 6–3, 6–2	21	
5.	(Germany) Alexander Zverev	6	Wimbledon, United Kingdom	Grass	4R	6–4, 7–6^{(8–6)}, 3–6, 3–6, 6–4	19	
6.	(Italy) Matteo Berrettini	8	Cincinnati Open, United States	Hard	3R	6–4, 6–3	17	
2022
7.	(Germany) Alexander Zverev	3	ATP Cup, Australia	Hard	RR	6–4, 4–6, 6–3	11	
8.	(Russia) Andrey Rublev	7	Rotterdam Open, Netherlands	Hard (i)	SF	6–7^{(5–7)}, 6–4, 6–2	9	
9.	(Greece) Stefanos Tsitsipas	4	Rotterdam Open, Netherlands	Hard (i)	F	6–4, 6–2	9	
10.	(Spain) Carlos Alcaraz	1	Davis Cup, Spain	Hard (i)	RR	6–7^{(3–7)}, 6–4, 6–2	13	
11.	(Serbia) Novak Djokovic	7	Laver Cup, United Kingdom	Hard (i)	RR	6–3, 7–6^{(7–3)}	13	
12.	(Spain) Carlos Alcaraz	1	Swiss Indoors, Switzerland	Hard (i)	SF	6–3, 6–2	9	
13.	(Spain) Rafael Nadal	2	ATP Finals, Italy	Hard (i)	RR	6–3, 6–4	6	
2023
14.	(Denmark) Holger Rune	6	Swiss Indoors, Switzerland	Hard (i)	SF	6–3, 6–2	19	
2024
15.	(Norway) Casper Ruud	6	Madrid Open, Spain	Clay	4R	6–4, 7–5	35	
16.	Daniil Medvedev	5	Paris Olympics, France	Clay	3R	6–3, 7–6^{(7–5)}	19	
17.	(Norway) Casper Ruud	9	Paris Olympics, France	Clay	QF	6–4, 6–7^{(8–10)}, 6–3	19	
18.	(Norway) Casper Ruud	8	Cincinnati Open, United States	Hard	2R	6–3, 6–1	19	
2025
19.	(United States) Taylor Fritz	4	United Cup, Australia	Hard	RR	4–6, 7–5, 6–3	29	
20.	Daniil Medvedev	6	Qatar Open, Qatar	Hard	QF	6–3, ret.	23	
21.	(Germany) Alexander Zverev	3	US Open, United States	Hard	3R	4–6, 7–6^{(9–7)}, 6–4, 6–4	27	
22.	(Australia) Alex de Minaur	8	US Open, United States	Hard	QF	4–6, 7–6^{(9–7)}, 7–5, 7–6^{(7–4)}	27	
23.	(Italy) Lorenzo Musetti	9	Shanghai Masters, China	Hard	4R	6–4, 6–2	13	
24.	(United States) Ben Shelton	5	ATP Finals, Italy	Hard (i)	RR	4–6, 7–6^{(9–7)}, 7–5	8	
25.	(Germany) Alexander Zverev	3	ATP Finals, Italy	Hard (i)	RR	6–4, 7–6^{(7–4)}	8	
2026
26.	(Kazakhstan) Alexander Bublik	10	Rotterdam Open, Netherlands	Hard (i)	SF	6–1, 6–2	6	

- Key: (Rk) first use, opponent rank; (Rd) round; (Rk) 2nd use, player rank; (Ref) reference; (F) final; (SF) semifinal; (QF) quarterfinal; (#R) rounds 4, 3, 2, 1; (RR) round-robin stage; (Q#) qualifying rounds or stages (3), 2, 1.

* As of 14 February 2026.

== National and international representation ==
=== Team competitions finals: 7 (5 titles, 2 runner-ups) ===
Finals by tournament Davis Cup (1–1) Laver Cup (2–1) ATP Cup (1–0) Hopman Cup (1–0)	Finals by team Canada (3–1) World (2–1)

Result	W–L	Date	Tournament	Surface	Team	Partner(s)	Opponent team	Opponent(s)	Score
Loss	0–1	Nov 2019	Davis Cup, Madrid	Hard (i)	Canada	Denis Shapovalov; Vasek Pospisil; Brayden Schnur	Spain	Rafael Nadal; Roberto Bautista Agut; Feliciano López; Pablo Carreño Busta; Marcel Granollers	0–2
Loss	0–2	Sep 2021	Laver Cup, Boston	Hard (i)	Team World	Denis Shapovalov; Diego Schwartzman; Reilly Opelka; John Isner; Nick Kyrgios	Team Europe	Daniil Medvedev; Stefanos Tsitsipas; Alexander Zverev; Andrey Rublev; Matteo Berrettini; Casper Ruud	1–14
Win	1–2	Jan 2022	ATP Cup, Sydney	Hard	Canada	Denis Shapovalov; Brayden Schnur; Steven Diez	Spain	Roberto Bautista Agut; Pablo Carreño Busta; Alejandro Davidovich Fokina; Albert Ramos Viñolas; Pedro Martínez	2–0
Win	2–2	Sep 2022	Laver Cup, London	Hard (i)	Team World	Taylor Fritz; Diego Schwartzman; Frances Tiafoe; Alex de Minaur; Jack Sock	Team Europe	Casper Ruud; Rafael Nadal; Stefanos Tsitsipas; Novak Djokovic; Andy Murray; Roger Federer; Matteo Berrettini; Cameron Norrie	13–8
Win	3–2	Nov 2022	Davis Cup, Málaga	Hard (i)	Canada	Denis Shapovalov; Vasek Pospisil; Alexis Galarneau; Gabriel Diallo	Australia	Alex de Minaur; Jordan Thompson; Thanasi Kokkinakis; Max Purcell; Matthew Ebden	2–0
Win	4–2	Sep 2023	Laver Cup, Vancouver	Hard (i)	Team World	Taylor Fritz; Frances Tiafoe; Tommy Paul; Ben Shelton; Francisco Cerúndolo	Team Europe	Andrey Rublev; Casper Ruud; Hubert Hurkacz; Alejandro Davidovich Fokina; Arthur Fils; Gaël Monfils	13–2
Win	5–2	Jul 2025	Hopman Cup, Bari	Hard	Canada	Bianca Andreescu	Italy	Flavio Cobolli; Lucia Bronzetti	2–1

=== Summer Olympics: 13 (7 wins – 6 losses) ===
Matches by tournament 2020 Tokyo Olympics (0–2) 2024 Paris Olympics (7–4)	Olympic medals: 1 Bronze medals: 1	Matches by medal finals Bronze medal finals (1–1)	Matches by type Singles (4–3) Doubles (0–1) Mixed doubles (3–2)	Matches by surface Hard (0–2) Clay (7–4)	Matches by setting Outdoors (7–6)

==== Singles: 7 (4–3) ====
Result	W–L	Year	Surface	Opponent	Rd	Score
Loss	0–1	2020	Hard	Max Purcell (AUS) (Alt)	1R	4–6, 6–7^{(2–7)}
Win	1–1	2024	Clay	Marcos Giron (USA)	1R	6–1, 6–4
Win	2–1	2024	Clay	Maximilian Marterer (GER)	2R	6–0, 6–1
Win	3–1	2024	Clay	Daniil Medvedev (AIN) (4)	3R	6–3, 7–6^{(7–5)}
Win	4–1	2024	Clay	Casper Ruud (NOR) (6)	QF	6–4, 6–7^{(8–10)}, 6–3
Loss	4–2	2024	Clay	Carlos Alcaraz (ESP) (2)	SF	1–6, 1–6
Loss	4–3	2024	Clay	Lorenzo Musetti (ITA) (11)	BM	4–6, 6–1, 3–6

==== Doubles: 1 (0–1) ====
Result	W–L	Year	Surface	Partner	Opponent	Rd	Score
Loss	0–1	2024	Clay	Milos Raonic	Taylor Fritz / Tommy Paul (USA) (3)	1R	6–7^{(14–16)}, 4–6

==== Mixed doubles: 5 (3–2, 1 bronze medal) ====
Result	W–L	Year	Surface	Partner	Opponent	Rd	Score
Loss	0–1	2020	Hard	Gabriela Dabrowski	Maria Sakkari / Stefanos Tsitsipas (GRE) (2)	1R	3–6, 4–6
Win	1–1	2024	Clay	Gabriela Dabrowski	Heather Watson / Joe Salisbury (GBR)	1R	7–5, 4–6, [10–3]
Win	2–1	2024	Clay	Gabriela Dabrowski	Coco Gauff / Taylor Fritz (USA) (3)	QF	7–6^{(7–2)}, 3–6, [10–8]
Loss	2–2	2024	Clay	Gabriela Dabrowski	Kateřina Siniaková / Tomáš Macháč (CZE)	SF	3–6, 3–6
Win	3–2	2024	Clay	Gabriela Dabrowski	Demi Schuurs / Wesley Koolhof (NED)	BM	6–3, 7–6^{(7–2)}

=== ATP Cup (8–7) ===
Matches by type
Singles (4–5)
Doubles (4–2)

Result	No.	Rubber	Match type (partner if any)	Opponent nation	Opponent player(s)	Score
▲5–4; 3–7 January 2020; Pat Rafter Arena, Brisbane, Australia; group stage; hard surface
Win	1	I	Singles	Greece	Michail Pervolarakis	6–1, 6–3
Win	2	III	Doubles (with Denis Shapovalov)	Greece	Michail Pervolarakis / Petros Tsitsipas	6–2, 6–3
Loss	3	I	Singles	Australia	John Millman	4–6, 2–6
Loss	4	III	Doubles (with Adil Shamasdin)	Australia	Chris Guccione / John Peers	6–3, 6–7^{(3–7)}, [8–10]
Loss	5	I	Singles	Germany	Jan-Lennard Struff	1–6, 4–6
Win	6	III	Doubles (with Denis Shapovalov)	Germany	Kevin Krawietz / Andreas Mies	6–3, 7–6^{(7–4)}
▼0–3; 10 January 2020; Ken Rosewall Arena, Sydney, Australia; knockout stage; hard surface
Loss	7	I	Singles	Serbia	Dušan Lajović	4–6, 2–6
▼4–5; 2–6 January 2022; Ken Roswell Arena, Sydney, Australia; group stage; hard surface
Loss	8	II	Singles	United States	Taylor Fritz	7–6^{(8–6)}, 4–6, 4–6
Loss	9	III	Doubles (with Denis Shapovalov)	United States	Taylor Fritz / John Isner	4–6, 4–6
Win	10	II	Singles	(United Kingdom) Great Britain	Cameron Norrie	7–6^{(7–4)}, 6–3
Win	11	III	Doubles (with Denis Shapovalov)	(United Kingdom) Great Britain	Jamie Murray / Joe Salisbury	6–4, 6–1
Win	12	II	Singles	Germany	Alexander Zverev	6–4, 4–6, 6–3
▲4–1; 8–9 January 2022; Ken Roswell Arena, Sydney, Australia; knockout stage; hard surface
Loss	13	II	Singles	Russia	Daniil Medvedev	4–6, 0–6
Win	14	III	Doubles (with Denis Shapovalov)	Russia	Daniil Medvedev / Roman Safiullin	4–6, 7–5, [10–7]
Win	15	II	Singles	Spain	Roberto Bautista Agut	7–6^{(7–3)}, 6–3

=== Laver Cup ===
==== Laver Cup matches (4–2) ====
Matches by type Singles (2–2) Doubles (2–0)	Matches by points scoring Day 1, 1 point (1–1) Day 2, 2 points (1–1) Day 3, 3 points (2–0)	Matches by venue Europe (2–1) Rest of the World (2–1)

- ▲ ▼ indicates the result of the Laver Cup match followed by the score, date, place of event and the court surface.

No.	Day (points)	Match type (partner if any)	Opponent team	Opponent player(s)	Result	Score
▼1–14; 24–26 September 2021; TD Garden, Boston, United States; hard (i) surface
1	Day 1 (1 point)	Singles	Team Europe	(Italy) Matteo Berrettini	Loss	7–6^{(7–3)}, 5–7, [8–10]
▲13–8; 23–25 September 2022; The O2 Arena, London, United Kingdom; hard (i) surface
2	Day 2 (2 points)	Singles	Team Europe	(Italy) Matteo Berrettini	Loss	6–7^{(11–13)}, 6–4, [7–10]
3	Day 3 (3 points)	Doubles (with (United States) Jack Sock)	Team Europe	(Italy) Matteo Berrettini / (United Kingdom) Andy Murray	Win	2–6, 6–3, [10–8]
4	Day 3 (3 points)	Singles	Team Europe	(Serbia) Novak Djokovic	Win	6–3, 7–6^{(7–3)}
▲13–2; 22–24 September 2023; Rogers Arena, Vancouver, Canada; hard (i) surface
5	Day 1 (1 point)	Singles	Team Europe	(France) Gaël Monfils	Win	6–4, 6–3
6	Day 2 (2 points)	Doubles (with (United States) Ben Shelton)	Team Europe	(Poland) Hubert Hurkacz / (France) Gaël Monfils	Win	7–5, 6–4

=== United Cup (4–4) ===
Matches by type
Singles (2–2)
Mixed doubles (2–2)

Venue	Surface	Rd	Opponent nation	Score	Match type	Opponent player(s)	W/L	Match score
2024
Sydney	Hard	RR	Greece	0–3	Mixed doubles (w/ S Fung)	D Papamichail / P Tsitsipas	Loss	5–7, 4–6
2025
Perth	Hard	RR	Croatia	2–1	Singles	Borna Ćorić	Loss	6–0, 4–6, 4–6
Perth	Hard	RR	Croatia	2–1	Mixed doubles (w/ L Fernandez)	L Ćirić Bagarić / I Dodig	Win	6–3, 6–4
Perth	Hard	RR	United States	1–2	Singles	Taylor Fritz	Win	4–6, 7–5, 6–3
Perth	Hard	RR	United States	1–2	Mixed doubles (w/ L Fernandez)	C Gauff / T Fritz	Loss	6–7^{(2–7)}, 5–7
2026
Sydney	Hard	RR	China	3–0	Singles	Zhang Zhizhen	Win	6–4, 6–4
Sydney	Hard	RR	China	3–0	Mixed doubles (w/ V Mboko)	X You / R Te	Win	6–1, 6–3
Sydney	Hard	RR	Belgium	0–3	Singles	Zizou Bergs	Loss	4–6, 2–6

=== Hopman Cup (5–1) ===
Matches by type
Singles (2–1)
Mixed doubles (3–0)

Venue	Surface	Rd	Opponent nation	Score	Match type	Opponent player(s)	W/L	Match score
2025
Bari	Hard	RR	Spain	3–0	Singles	Roberto Bautista Agut	Win	6–3, 7–6^{(7–3)}
Bari	Hard	RR	Spain	3–0	Mixed doubles (w/ B Andresscu)	M Bassols Ribera / R Bautista Agut	Win	6–3, 0–0 ret.
Bari	Hard	RR	Greece	3–0	Singles	Stefanos Tsitsipas	Win	7–6^{(7–4)}, 6–3
Bari	Hard	RR	Greece	3–0	Mixed doubles (w/ B Andresscu)	D Papamichail / S Tsitsipas	Win	6–4, 0–0 ret.
Bari	Hard	F	Italy	2–1	Singles	Flavio Cobolli	Loss	7–6^{(9–7)}, 5–7, [8–10]
Bari	Hard	F	Italy	2–1	Mixed doubles (w/ B Andresscu)	L Bronzetti / F Cobolli	Win	6–3, 6–3

== Longest winning streaks ==
=== 16 match win streak (2022) ===
#	Tournament	Category	Start date	Surface	Rd	Opponent	Rank	Score
–	Astana Open	ATP 500	3 October 2022	Hard (i)	1R	(Spain) Roberto Bautista Agut	No. 21	4–6, 6–7^{(6–8)}
1	Firenze Open	ATP 250	10 October 2022	Hard (i)	2R	(Germany) Oscar Otte	No. 55	6–4, 6–7^{(2–7)}, 6–2
2	Firenze Open	ATP 250	10 October 2022	Hard (i)	QF	(United States) Brandon Nakashima (8)	No. 46	6–3, 6–4
3	Firenze Open	ATP 250	10 October 2022	Hard (i)	SF	(Italy) Lorenzo Musetti (3)	No. 28	6–2, 6–3
4	Firenze Open	ATP 250	10 October 2022	Hard (i)	F	(United States) J. J. Wolf	No. 75	6–4, 6–4
5	European Open	ATP 250	17 October 2022	Hard (i)	2R	(France) Manuel Guinard (LL)	No. 148	6–3, 6–3
6	European Open	ATP 250	17 October 2022	Hard (i)	QF	(United Kingdom) Dan Evans (5)	No. 26	4–6, 7–6^{(7–4)}, 6–2
7	European Open	ATP 250	17 October 2022	Hard (i)	SF	(France) Richard Gasquet	No. 82	7–6^{(7–2)}, 7–6^{(7–3)}
8	European Open	ATP 250	17 October 2022	Hard (i)	F	(United States) Sebastian Korda	No. 36	6–3, 6–4
9	Swiss Indoors	ATP 500	24 October 2022	Hard (i)	1R	(Switzerland) Marc-Andrea Hüsler (WC)	No. 62	6–7^{(3–7)}, 6–4, 6–4
10	Swiss Indoors	ATP 500	24 October 2022	Hard (i)	2R	(Serbia) Miomir Kecmanović	No. 28	6–1, 6–0
11	Swiss Indoors	ATP 500	24 October 2022	Hard (i)	QF	(Kazakhstan) Alexander Bublik	No. 38	6–2, 6–3
12	Swiss Indoors	ATP 500	24 October 2022	Hard (i)	SF	(Spain) Carlos Alcaraz (1)	No. 1	6–3, 6–2
13	Swiss Indoors	ATP 500	24 October 2022	Hard (i)	F	(Denmark) Holger Rune	No. 25	6–3, 7–5
14	Rolex Paris Masters	ATP 1000	31 October 2022	Hard (i)	2R	(Sweden) Mikael Ymer (Q)	No. 74	6–7^{(6–8)}, 6–4, 7–6^{(8–6)}
15	Rolex Paris Masters	ATP 1000	31 October 2022	Hard (i)	3R	(France) Gilles Simon (WC)	No. 188	6–1, 6–3
16	Rolex Paris Masters	ATP 1000	31 October 2022	Hard (i)	QF	(United States) Frances Tiafoe (16)	No. 21	6–1, 6–4
ended	Rolex Paris Masters	ATP 1000	31 October 2022	Hard (i)	SF	(Denmark) Holger Rune	No. 18	4–6, 2–6

== ATP Tour career earnings ==
Year	Earnings (US$)	Money list rank
2015	4,008	n/a
2016	16,879	570
2017	66,108	317
2018	298,857	147
2019	1,507,622	30
2020	1,238,721	14
2021	2,144,102	11
2022	4,801,292	6
2023	1,734,514	25
2024	2,092,986	27
2025	5,820,031	7
2026	3,217,826	15
Career	$24,782,349	27

* Statistics correct as of 9 November 2026.

== Notable exhibitions ==
=== Tournament Finals ===
Result	Date	Tournament	Surface	Opponent	Score
Loss	Aug 2020	Ultimate Tennis Showdown, Biot, France	Hard	(Germany) Alexander Zverev	10–19, 13–11, 18–10, 8–18, 1–3
Win	Apr 2026	Ultimate Tennis Showdown, Nîmes, France	Clay	(Norway) Casper Ruud	10–11, 14–10, 14–15, 15–11, 2–0

=== Matches ===
Result	Date	Tournament	Surface	Opponent	Score
Loss	Jun 2022	Giorgio Armani Tennis Classic, Hurlingham, London, England	Grass	(Serbia) Novak Djokovic	2–6, 1–6
Win	Jun 2022	Giorgio Armani Tennis Classic, Hurlingham, London, England	Grass	(Spain) Rafael Nadal	7–6^{(8–6)}, 4–6, [10–3]
Win	Dec 2022	World Tennis League, Dubai, United Arab Emirates	Hard	(Australia) Nick Kyrgios	7–5, 6–3
Win	Dec 2022	World Tennis League, Dubai, United Arab Emirates	Hard	(Austria) Dominic Thiem	7–6^{(7–2)}, 7–6^{(7–6)}
Win	Dec 2022	World Tennis League, Dubai, United Arab Emirates	Hard	(Germany) Alexander Zverev	6–4, 6–3
Loss	Jan 2026	Australian Open Opening Week, Melbourne, Australia	Hard	(Italy) Jannik Sinner	4–6, 6–4, [4–10]

== See also ==
- Canada Davis Cup team
- List of Canada Davis Cup team representatives
