= Frédéric Fontang =

French tennis player (born 1970)

- Country (sports): France
- Residence: Pau, France
- Born: 18 March 1970 (age 56) Casablanca, Morocco
- Height: 1.83 m (6 ft 0 in)
- Turned pro: 1989
- Retired: 1999
- Plays: Right-handed
- Prize money: $513,509

Singles
- Career record: 28–60
- Career titles: 1
- Highest ranking: No. 59 (14 October 1991)

Grand Slam singles results
- Australian Open: 1R (1992)
- French Open: 2R (1997)
- Wimbledon: 1R (1992)

Doubles
- Career record: 0–0
- Career titles: 0
- Highest ranking: No. 589 (14 October 1991)

Frédéric Fontang (French pronunciation: [fʁedeʁik fɔ̃tɑ̃ɡ]; born 18 March 1970) is a coach and a former professional tennis player from France.

== Career ==
A successful junior, Fontang won the Petits As in 1984 and was the French 16s champion in 1986.

Fontang had his best year on tour in 1991 when he reached two ATP Tour finals. He was runner-up in the San Marino Open and won a tournament in Palermo.

The following year he reached the quarterfinals at Palermo and was also a quarterfinalist in the Estoril Open. At these tournaments he had wins over three top 40 players, Franco Davín, Javier Sánchez and Fabrice Santoro.

Fontang took part in seven French Opens but didn't register a win until his final attempt, in 1997, when he defeated Patrik Fredriksson in the opening round.

== Coaching ==
He later became the coach of Jérémy Chardy and remained with him for 12 years. During this time Chardy won the 2005 Wimbledon Championships Boys' Singles title, won ATP 250 title in Stuttgart and reached the fourth round of the French Open the next year.

=== Coaching history ===
- coach of Caroline Garcia from March 2011 to June 2012.

- final of the US Open Juniors
- semifinal of the French Open Juniors

- coach of Vasek Pospisil from October 2012 until August 2016.

- from No. 140 to world No. 25 ATP singles ranking
- career-high in doubles of world No. 4

- coach of Félix Auger-Aliassime from Jan 2017 to July 2026.

- 9 ATP titles
- ATP 1000 finals in Madrid (2024) and Paris (2025)
- best ranking of world No. 4

== ATP career finals ==
=== Singles: 2 (1–1) ===
Result	W/L	Date	Tournament	Surface	Opponent	Score
Loss	0–1	1991	San Marino, San Marino	Clay	(Argentina) Guillermo Pérez Roldán	3–6, 1–6
Win	1–1	1991	Palermo, Italy	Clay	(Spain) Emilio Sánchez	1–6, 6–3, 6–3

== Challenger titles ==
=== Singles: (1) ===
No.	Year	Tournament	Surface	Opponent	Score
1.	1991	Merano, Italy	Clay	(Spain) Carlos Costa	6–3, 6–3
