= 2022 Firenze Open – Doubles =

Doubles
- 2022 Firenze Open

Final
- Champions: (France) Édouard Roger-Vasselin (France) Nicolas Mahut
- Runners-up: (Croatia) Ivan Dodig (United States) Austin Krajicek
- Score: 7–6^{(7–4)}, 6–3

Events
| Singles | Doubles |
- Firenze Open

Édouard Roger-Vasselin and Nicolas Mahut defeated Ivan Dodig and Austin Krajicek in the final, 7–6^{(7–4)}, 6–3 to win the doubles tennis title at the 2022 Firenze Open.

This was the first edition of an ATP Tour event in Florence since 1994.

== Seeds ==
1. (Netherlands) Wesley Koolhof / (United Kingdom) Neal Skupski (first round)
2. (Croatia) Nikola Mektić / (Croatia) Mate Pavić (quarterfinals)
3. (Croatia) Ivan Dodig / (United States) Austin Krajicek (final)
4. (Australia) Matthew Ebden / (Australia) John Peers (first round)

== Draw ==
Key

- Q = Qualifier
- WC = Wild card
- LL = Lucky loser
- Alt = Alternate
- ITF = ITF entry
- PR = Protected ranking
- SR = Special ranking
- SE = Special exempt
- JE = Junior exempt
- JR = Junior Accelerator Programme entrant
- CO = College Accelerator Programme entrant
- NG = Next Gen Accelerator Program entrant
- w/o = Walkover
- r = Retired
- d = Defaulted

=== Draw ===
First round
1 | (Netherlands) W Koolhof (United Kingdom) N Skupski | 2 | 4
(France) N Mahut (France) É Roger-Vasselin | 6 | 6
(United States) M Cressy (Australia) J-P Smith | 4 | 6 | [10]
WC | (Italy) J Berrettini (Italy) M Berrettini | 6 | 2 | [6]
4 | (Australia) M Ebden (Australia) J Peers | 3 | 6 | [8]
(France) S Doumbia (France) F Reboul | 6 | 2 | [10]
(Spain) R Carballés Baena (Colombia) DE Galán | 7 | 3 | [5]
(Colombia) N Barrientos (Mexico) MÁ Reyes-Varela | 5 | 6 | [10]
(Kazakhstan) A Nedovyesov (Austria) P Oswald | 3 | 3
(Bosnia and Herzegovina) T Brkić (Ecuador) G Escobar | 6 | 6
WC | (Italy) F Cobolli (Italy) G Zeppieri | 5 | 3
3 | (Croatia) I Dodig (United States) A Krajicek | 7 | 6
(Kazakhstan) A Golubev (Japan) B McLachlan | 5 | 2
(Italy) L Sonego (Italy) A Vavassori | 7 | 6
(Austria) A Erler (Austria) L Miedler | 4 | 2
2 | (Croatia) N Mektić (Croatia) M Pavić | 6 | 6

Quarterfinals
(France) N Mahut (France) É Roger-Vasselin | 6 | 6
(United States) M Cressy (Australia) J-P Smith | 4 | 1
(France) S Doumbia (France) F Reboul | 7^{7} | 6
(Colombia) N Barrientos (Mexico) MÁ Reyes-Varela | 6^{4} | 2
(Bosnia and Herzegovina) T Brkić (Ecuador) G Escobar | 6 | 3 | [5]
3 | (Croatia) I Dodig (United States) A Krajicek | 4 | 6 | [10]
(Italy) L Sonego (Italy) A Vavassori | 6 | 6
2 | (Croatia) N Mektić (Croatia) M Pavić | 1 | 4

Semifinals
(France) N Mahut (France) É Roger-Vasselin | 6 | 7^{7}
(France) S Doumbia (France) F Reboul | 4 | 6^{4}
3 | (Croatia) I Dodig (United States) A Krajicek | 6 | 3 | [12]
(Italy) L Sonego (Italy) A Vavassori | 2 | 6 | [10]

Final
(France) N Mahut (France) É Roger-Vasselin | 7^{7} | 6
3 | (Croatia) I Dodig (United States) A Krajicek | 6^{4} | 3
