= 2022 Swiss Indoors =

- Date: 24–30 October
- Edition: 51st
- Category: ATP World Tour 500
- Draw: 32S / 16D
- Prize money: €2,135,350
- Surface: Hard / indoor
- Location: Basel, Switzerland
- Venue: St. Jakobshalle

Champions

Singles
- (Canada) Félix Auger-Aliassime

Doubles
- (Croatia) Ivan Dodig / (United States) Austin Krajicek
- Swiss Indoors

The 2022 Swiss Indoors was a men's tennis tournament to be played on indoor hard courts. It was the 51st edition of the event, and part of the 500 series of the 2022 ATP Tour. It was held at the St. Jakobshalle in Basel, Switzerland, from 24 through 30 October 2022. It was the first edition of the event since 2019, with the 2020 and 2021 editions cancelled due to the border restrictions in the French and German borders on the COVID-19 pandemic. Third-seeded Félix Auger-Aliassime won the singles title.

== Finals ==
=== Singles ===
(Canada) Félix Auger-Aliassime defeated (Denmark) Holger Rune, 6–3, 7–5

- It was Auger-Aliassime's 4th and last singles title of the year and the 4th of his career.

=== Doubles ===
(Croatia) Ivan Dodig / (United States) Austin Krajicek defeated (France) Nicolas Mahut / (France) Édouard Roger-Vasselin, 6–4, 7–6^{(7–5)}

== Singles main draw entrants ==
=== Seeds ===
| Country | Player | Rank^{1} | Seed |
|---|---|---|---|
| ESP | Carlos Alcaraz | 1 | 1 |
| NOR | Casper Ruud | 3 | 2 |
| CAN | Félix Auger-Aliassime | 10 | 3 |
| CRO | Marin Čilić | 13 | 4 |
| ESP | Pablo Carreño Busta | 15 | 5 |
| ESP | Roberto Bautista Agut | 22 | 6 |
| AUS | Alex de Minaur | 23 | 7 |
| ITA | Lorenzo Musetti | 24 | 8 |

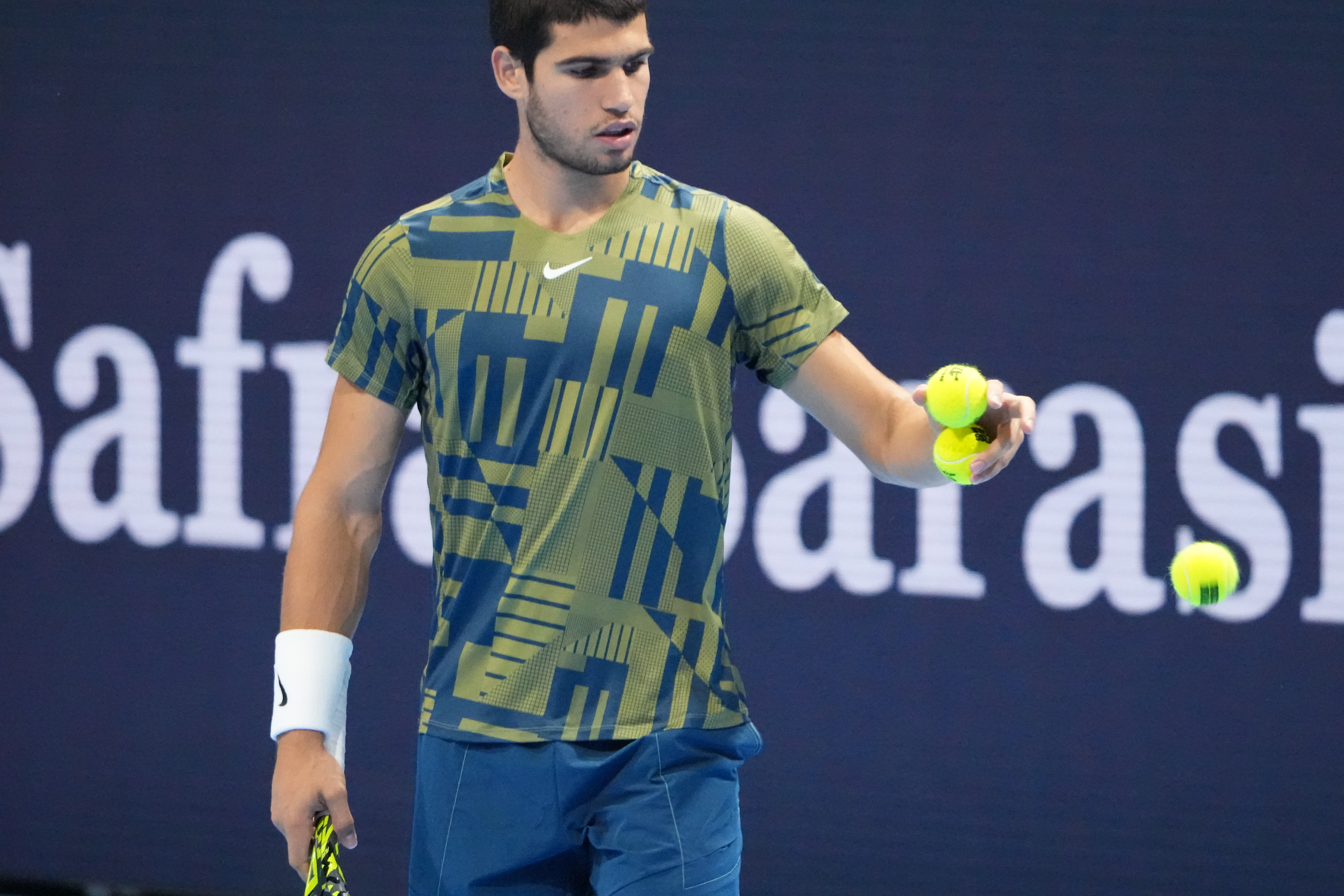
Carlos Alcaraz, Swiss Indoors Basel 2022.

- Rankings are as of 17 October 2022

=== Other entrants ===
The following players received wildcards into the singles main draw:

- (Belgium) David Goffin
- (Switzerland) Marc-Andrea Hüsler
- (Switzerland) Dominic Stricker

The following player received entry as a special exempt:

- (United States) Mackenzie McDonald

The following player received entry using a protected ranking into the main draw:

- (Switzerland) Stan Wawrinka

The following players received entry from the qualifying draw:

- (Serbia) Laslo Đere
- (France) Ugo Humbert
- (France) Arthur Rinderknech
- Roman Safiullin

The following player received entry as a lucky loser:

- Aslan Karatsev

=== Withdrawals ===
- (United States) Sebastian Korda → replaced by Aslan Karatsev
- (Australia) Nick Kyrgios → replaced by (United Kingdom) Jack Draper

== Doubles main draw entrants ==
=== Seeds ===
| Country | Player | Country | Player | Rank^{1} | Seed |
|---|---|---|---|---|---|
| ESA | Marcelo Arévalo | NED | Jean-Julien Rojer | 11 | 1 |
| GER | Tim Pütz | NZL | Michael Venus | 19 | 2 |
| ESP | Marcel Granollers | ARG | Horacio Zeballos | 23 | 3 |
| GBR | Lloyd Glasspool | FIN | Harri Heliövaara | 33 | 4 |

- Rankings are as of 17 October 2022

=== Other entrants ===
The following pairs received wildcards into the doubles main draw:

- (Switzerland) Marc-Andrea Hüsler / (Switzerland) Dominic Stricker
- (Switzerland) Jérôme Kym / (Switzerland) Leandro Riedi

The following pair received entry from the qualifying draw:

- (Kazakhstan) Andrey Golubev / (Kazakhstan) Aleksandr Nedovyesov

The following pair received entry as lucky losers:

- (United States) Nathaniel Lammons / (United States) Jackson Withrow

=== Withdrawals ===
- (Australia) Nick Kyrgios / (Spain) Pedro Martínez → replaced by (United States) Nathaniel Lammons / (United States) Jackson Withrow
