= 2022 Swiss Indoors – Doubles =

Doubles
- 2022 Swiss Indoors

Final
- Champions: (Croatia) Ivan Dodig (United States) Austin Krajicek
- Runners-up: (France) Nicolas Mahut (France) Édouard Roger-Vasselin
- Score: 6–4, 7–6^{(7–5)}

Details
- Draw: 16
- Seeds: 4

Events
Singles	Doubles
← 2019 ·	Swiss Indoors	· 2023 →

Ivan Dodig and Austin Krajicek defeated Nicolas Mahut and Édouard Roger-Vasselin in the final, 6–4, 7–6^{(7–5)} to win the doubles tennis title at the 2022 Swiss Indoors.

Jean-Julien Rojer and Horia Tecău were the defending champions from 2019, when the event was last held, but Tecău retired from professional tennis in November 2021. Rojer partnered Marcelo Arévalo, but lost in the quarterfinals to Dodig and Krajicek.

== Seeds ==
1. (El Salvador) Marcelo Arévalo / (Netherlands) Jean-Julien Rojer (quarterfinals)
2. (Germany) Tim Pütz / (New Zealand) Michael Venus (first round)
3. (Spain) Marcel Granollers / (Argentina) Horacio Zeballos (first round)
4. (United Kingdom) Lloyd Glasspool / (Finland) Harri Heliövaara (first round)

== Draw ==
=== Key ===
- Q = Qualifier
- WC = Wild card
- LL = Lucky loser
- Alt = Alternate
- SE = Special exempt
- PR = Protected ranking
- ITF = ITF entry
- JE = Junior exempt
- w/o = Walkover
- r = Retired
- d = Defaulted
- SR = Special ranking

=== Draw ===
First round
1	(El Salvador) M Arévalo (Netherlands) J-J Rojer	5	6	[10]
(Italy) L Musetti (Spain) A Ramos Viñolas	7	2	[6]
(Croatia) I Dodig (United States) A Krajicek	6	6
(Australia) M Ebden (United Kingdom) J Murray	4	4
4	(United Kingdom) L Glasspool (Finland) H Heliövaara	5	6	[3]
Q	(Kazakhstan) A Golubev (Kazakhstan) A Nedovyesov	7	4	[10]
(Italy) S Bolelli (Italy) F Fognini	7	6^{5}	[6]
(Brazil) R Matos (Spain) D Vega Hernández	5	7^{7}	[10]
LL	(United States) N Lammons (United States) J Withrow	5	7^{7}	[6]
(France) N Mahut (France) É Roger-Vasselin	7	6^{5}	[10]
WC	(Switzerland) J Kym (Switzerland) L Riedi	5	6	[11]
3	(Spain) M Granollers (Argentina) H Zeballos	7	3	[9]
(United States) M Cressy (Netherlands) B van de Zandschulp	6^{4}	7^{12}	[12]
WC	(Switzerland) M-A Hüsler (Switzerland) D Stricker	7^{7}	6^{10}	[10]
(Monaco) H Nys (Poland) J Zieliński	7	7
2	(Germany) T Pütz (New Zealand) M Venus	5	5

Quarterfinals
1	(El Salvador) M Arévalo (Netherlands) J-J Rojer	4	3
(Croatia) I Dodig (United States) A Krajicek	6	6
Q	(Kazakhstan) A Golubev (Kazakhstan) A Nedovyesov	7	6
(Brazil) R Matos (Spain) D Vega Hernández	5	3
(France) N Mahut (France) É Roger-Vasselin	2	6	[10]
WC	(Switzerland) J Kym (Switzerland) L Riedi	6	4	[3]
(United States) M Cressy (Netherlands) B van de Zandschulp	2	7	[11]
(Monaco) H Nys (Poland) J Zieliński	6	5	[9]

Semifinals
(Croatia) I Dodig (United States) A Krajicek	6	6
Q	(Kazakhstan) A Golubev (Kazakhstan) A Nedovyesov	3	4
(France) N Mahut (France) É Roger-Vasselin	6^{4}	6	[10]
(United States) M Cressy (Netherlands) B van de Zandschulp	7^{7}	4	[6]

Final
(Croatia) I Dodig (United States) A Krajicek	6	7^{7}
(France) N Mahut (France) É Roger-Vasselin	4	6^{5}

== Qualifying ==
=== Seeds ===
1. (United States) Nathaniel Lammons / (United States) Jackson Withrow (qualifying competition, lucky losers)
2. (Kazakhstan) Andrey Golubev / (Kazakhstan) Aleksandr Nedovyesov (qualified)

=== Qualifiers ===
1. (Kazakhstan) Andrey Golubev / (Kazakhstan) Aleksandr Nedovyesov

=== Lucky losers ===
1. (United States) Nathaniel Lammons / (United States) Jackson Withrow

=== Qualifying draw ===
First round
1	(United States) Nathaniel Lammons (United States) Jackson Withrow	7	5	[12]
Alt	(Germany) Fabian Fallert (Germany) Hendrik Jebens	5	7	[10]
(Colombia) Diego Hidalgo (Colombia) Cristian Rodríguez	4	6	[9]
2	(Kazakhstan) Andrey Golubev (Kazakhstan) Aleksandr Nedovyesov	6	3	[11]

Qualifying competition
1	(United States) Nathaniel Lammons (United States) Jackson Withrow	3	6	[3]
2	(Kazakhstan) Andrey Golubev (Kazakhstan) Aleksandr Nedovyesov	6	3	[10]
