= 2022 Firenze Open =

- Date: 10–16 October
- Edition: 1st
- Category: ATP Tour 250
- Draw: 28S / 16D
- Prize money: €612,000
- Surface: Hard / indoor
- Location: Florence, Italy
- Venue: Palazzo Wanny

Champions

Singles
- (Canada) Félix Auger-Aliassime

Doubles
- (France) Nicolas Mahut / (France) Édouard Roger-Vasselin
ATP Florence

The 2022 Firenze Open (also known as the 2022 UniCredit Firenze Open for sponsorship) is a professional men's tennis tournament played on indoor hard courts. It was the 1st edition of the ATP Florence event since 1994, and part of the ATP Tour 250 series of the 2022 ATP Tour. It was played at Palazzo Wanny in Florence, Italy, from 10 to 16 October 2022.

The event was one of the six tournaments that were given single-year ATP 250 licenses in September and October 2022 due to the cancellation of tournaments in China because of the ongoing COVID-19 pandemic.

== Finals ==
=== Singles ===
(Canada) Félix Auger-Aliassime defeated (United States) J. J. Wolf, 6–4, 6–4

- It was Auger-Aliassime's 2nd singles title of the year and of his career.

=== Doubles ===
(France) Nicolas Mahut / (France) Édouard Roger-Vasselin defeated (Croatia) Ivan Dodig / (United States) Austin Krajicek, 7–6^{(7–4)}, 6–3

== Singles main-draw entrants ==
=== Seeds ===
Country	Player	Rank^{†}	Seed
CAN	Félix Auger-Aliassime	13	1
ITA	Matteo Berrettini	16	2
ITA	Lorenzo Musetti	27	3
USA	Maxime Cressy	32	4
	Aslan Karatsev	39	5
USA	Jenson Brooksby	42	6
KAZ	Alexander Bublik	43	7
USA	Brandon Nakashima	47	8

^{†} Rankings are as of 3 October 2022.

=== Other entrants ===
The following players received wildcards into the main draw:

- (Italy) Francesco Maestrelli
- (Italy) Francesco Passaro
- (Italy) Giulio Zeppieri

The following players received entry from the qualifying draw:

- (Turkey) Altuğ Çelikbilek
- (Italy) Flavio Cobolli
- (Netherlands) Tim van Rijthoven
- (Sweden) Mikael Ymer

The following player received entry as a lucky loser:

- (China) Zhang Zhizhen

=== Withdrawals ===
- (Georgia (country)) Nikoloz Basilashvili → replaced by (United States) Brandon Nakashima
- (Belgium) David Goffin → replaced by (China) Zhang Zhizhen
- (Serbia) Filip Krajinović → replaced by (France) Richard Gasquet
- (Czech Republic) Jiří Lehečka → replaced by (Hungary) Márton Fucsovics
- (France) Gaël Monfils → replaced by (Spain) Roberto Carballés Baena
- (Japan) Yoshihito Nishioka → replaced by (France) Corentin Moutet
- (Denmark) Holger Rune → replaced by (Spain) Bernabé Zapata Miralles
- (Finland) Emil Ruusuvuori → replaced by (Colombia) Daniel Elahi Galán
- (Italy) Jannik Sinner → replaced by (United States) J. J. Wolf

== Doubles main-draw entrants ==
=== Seeds ===
Country	Player	Country	Player	Rank^{1}	Seed
NED	Wesley Koolhof	GBR	Neal Skupski	7	1
CRO	Nikola Mektić	CRO	Mate Pavić	19	2
CRO	Ivan Dodig	USA	Austin Krajicek	49	3
AUS	Matthew Ebden	AUS	John Peers	50	4

- ^{1} Rankings as of 3 October 2022.

=== Other entrants ===
The following pairs received wildcards into the doubles main draw:

- (Italy) Jacopo Berrettini / (Italy) Matteo Berrettini
- (Italy) Flavio Cobolli / (Italy) Giulio Zeppieri

=== Withdrawals ===
- (El Salvador) Marcelo Arévalo / (Netherlands) Jean-Julien Rojer → replaced by (Austria) Alexander Erler / (Austria) Lucas Miedler
- (Uruguay) Ariel Behar / (Kazakhstan) Andrey Golubev → replaced by (Kazakhstan) Andrey Golubev / (Japan) Ben McLachlan
- (Colombia) Juan Sebastián Cabal / (Colombia) Robert Farah → replaced by (France) Sadio Doumbia / (France) Fabien Reboul
- (Serbia) Nikola Ćaćić / (Serbia) Filip Krajinović → replaced by (United States) Maxime Cressy / (Australia) John-Patrick Smith
- (United Kingdom) Lloyd Glasspool / (Finland) Harri Heliövaara → replaced by (Colombia) Nicolás Barrientos / (Mexico) Miguel Ángel Reyes-Varela
- (Germany) Kevin Krawietz / (Germany) Andreas Mies → replaced by (Spain) Roberto Carballés Baena / (Colombia) Daniel Elahi Galán
