= 2022 Swiss Indoors – Singles =

Singles
- 2022 Swiss Indoors

Final
- Champion: (Canada) Félix Auger-Aliassime
- Runner-up: (Denmark) Holger Rune
- Score: 6–3, 7–5

Details
- Draw: 32 (4 Q / 3 WC )
- Seeds: 8

Events
Singles	Doubles
← 2019 ·	Swiss Indoors	· 2023 →

Félix Auger-Aliassime defeated Holger Rune in the final, 6–3, 7–5 to win the singles tennis title at the 2022 Swiss Indoors. It was his third title in as many weeks and fourth career ATP Tour singles title overall.

Roger Federer was the reigning champion from 2019, when the tournament was last held, but retired from professional tennis in September 2022.

== Seeds ==
1. (Spain) Carlos Alcaraz (semifinals)
2. (Norway) Casper Ruud (first round)
3. (Canada) Félix Auger-Aliassime (champion)
4. (Croatia) Marin Čilić (first round)
5. (Spain) Pablo Carreño Busta (quarterfinals)
6. (Spain) Roberto Bautista Agut (semifinals)
7. (Australia) Alex de Minaur (first round)
8. (Italy) Lorenzo Musetti (first round)

== Draw ==
=== Key ===
- Q = Qualifier
- WC = Wild card
- LL = Lucky loser
- Alt = Alternate
- SE = Special exempt
- PR = Protected ranking
- ITF = ITF entry
- JE = Junior exempt
- w/o = Walkover
- r = Retired
- d = Defaulted
- SR = Special ranking

=== Finals ===
Semifinals
1	(Spain) Carlos Alcaraz	3	2
3	(Canada) Félix Auger-Aliassime	6	6
(Denmark) Holger Rune	7^{7}	7^{8}
6	(Spain) Roberto Bautista Agut	6^{1}	6^{6}

Final
3	(Canada) Félix Auger-Aliassime	6	7
(Denmark) Holger Rune	3	5

=== Top half ===
First round
1	(Spain) C Alcaraz	3	6	7
(United Kingdom) J Draper	6	2	5
(Netherlands) B van de Zandschulp	6	4	6
(France) A Mannarino	4	6	4
(United States) M Cressy	6^{4}	3
WC	(Switzerland) D Stricker	7^{7}	6
(Argentina) S Báez	2	1
5	(Spain) P Carreño Busta	6	6
3	(Canada) F Auger-Aliassime	6^{3}	6	6
WC	(Switzerland) M-A Hüsler	7^{7}	4	4
(Spain) A Davidovich Fokina	7^{7}	2	1
(Serbia) M Kecmanović	6^{5}	6	6
LL	A Karatsev	3	6^{2}
(Kazakhstan) A Bublik	6	7^{7}
(Spain) A Ramos Viñolas	1	6	6
8	(Italy) L Musetti	6	3	4

Second round
1	(Spain) C Alcaraz	6	6
(Netherlands) B van de Zandschulp	4	2
WC	(Switzerland) D Stricker	5	7^{7}	4
5	(Spain) P Carreño Busta	7	6^{3}	6
3	(Canada) F Auger-Aliassime	6	6
(Serbia) M Kecmanović	1	0
(Kazakhstan) A Bublik	6	6
(Spain) A Ramos Viñolas	3	3

Quarterfinals
1	(Spain) C Alcaraz	6	6
5	(Spain) P Carreño Busta	3	4
3	(Canada) F Auger-Aliassime	6	6
(Kazakhstan) A Bublik	2	3

Semifinals
1	(Spain) C Alcaraz	3	2
3	(Canada) F Auger-Aliassime	6	6

=== Bottom half ===
First round
7	(Australia) A de Minaur	2	5
(Denmark) H Rune	6	7
(United States) J Brooksby	1	4
Q	(France) U Humbert	6	6
(Slovakia) A Molčan	5	6	7
SE	(United States) M McDonald	7	4	5
Q	(France) A Rinderknech	6	3	7^{7}
4	(Croatia) M Čilić	4	6	6^{5}
6	(Spain) R Bautista Agut	6	6
Q	(Serbia) L Đere	4	1
Q	R Safiullin	7^{7}	3	4
(United Kingdom) A Murray	6^{5}	6	6
(United States) B Nakashima	2	7^{7}	6
WC	(Belgium) D Goffin	6	6^{4}	4
PR	(Switzerland) S Wawrinka	6	6
2	(Norway) C Ruud	4	4

Second round
(Denmark) H Rune	6	6
Q	(France) U Humbert	4	2
(Slovakia) A Molčan	2	4
Q	(France) A Rinderknech	6	6
6	(Spain) R Bautista Agut	6	6
(United Kingdom) A Murray	3	2
(United States) B Nakashima	4	7	4
PR	(Switzerland) S Wawrinka	6	5	6

Quarterfinals
(Denmark) H Rune	7^{7}	6
Q	(France) A Rinderknech	6^{0}	2
6	(Spain) R Bautista Agut	7	7^{7}
PR	(Switzerland) S Wawrinka	5	6^{5}

Semifinals
(Denmark) H Rune	7^{7}	7^{8}
6	(Spain) R Bautista Agut	6^{1}	6^{6}

== Qualifying ==
=== Seeds ===
1. Aslan Karatsev (qualifying competition, lucky loser)
2. (France) Arthur Rinderknech (qualified)
3. (Spain) Jaume Munar (qualifying competition)
4. (Spain) Pedro Martínez (first round)
5. (Italy) Fabio Fognini (withdrew)
6. (France) Constant Lestienne (qualifying competition)
7. (Spain) Bernabé Zapata Miralles (first round)
8. (Serbia) Laslo Đere (qualified)

=== Qualifiers ===
1. (France) Ugo Humbert
2. (France) Arthur Rinderknech
3. Roman Safiullin
4. (Serbia) Laslo Đere

=== Lucky loser ===
1. Aslan Karatsev

=== Qualifying draw ===
==== First qualifier ====
First round
1	Aslan Karatsev	6	7^{7}
WC	(Switzerland) Leandro Riedi	4	6^{3}
Alt	(France) Ugo Humbert	6	6
7	(Spain) Bernabé Zapata Miralles	3	3

Qualifying competition
1	Aslan Karatsev	6	6^{1}	1
Alt	(France) Ugo Humbert	4	7^{7}	6

==== Second qualifier ====
First round
2	(France) Arthur Rinderknech	6	6^{5}	6
Alt	(Australia) Jason Kubler	4	7^{7}	2
WC	(Switzerland) Antoine Bellier	4	6^{2}
6	(France) Constant Lestienne	6	7^{7}

Qualifying competition
2	(France) Arthur Rinderknech	3	6	6
6	(France) Constant Lestienne	6	3	4

==== Third qualifier ====
First round
3	(Spain) Jaume Munar	6	6
(Australia) Alexei Popyrin	3	4
Roman Safiullin	7	6
Alt	(Germany) Jan-Lennard Struff	5	1

Qualifying competition
3	(Spain) Jaume Munar	4	3
Roman Safiullin	6	6

==== Fourth qualifier ====
First round
4	(Spain) Pedro Martínez	2	6^{2}
Alt	(Japan) Taro Daniel	6	7^{7}
WC	(Switzerland) Jérôme Kym	6	6^{3}	4
8	(Serbia) Laslo Đere	3	7^{7}	6

Qualifying competition
Alt	(Japan) Taro Daniel	6	3	6^{3}
8	(Serbia) Laslo Đere	4	6	7^{7}
