= 2022 Laver Cup =

Fifth edition of the Laver Cup, a men's tennis tournament

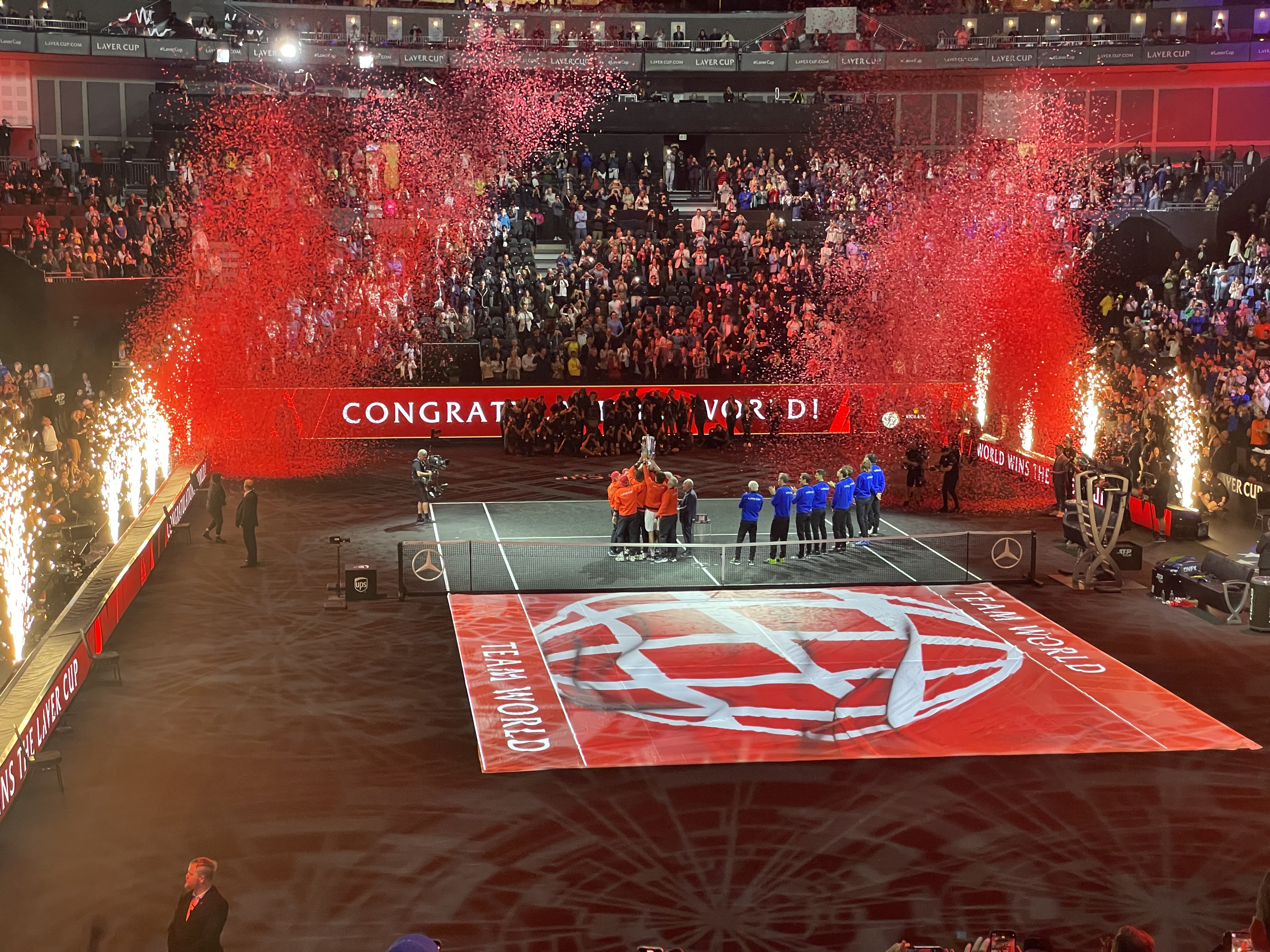
- Date: 23–25 September 2022
- Edition: 5th
- Surface: Hard (indoor)
- Location: London, England
- Venue: The O2 Arena

Champions
- Team World; 13 – 8
- Laver Cup

The 2022 Laver Cup was the fifth edition of the Laver Cup, a men's tennis tournament between teams from Europe and the rest of the world. It was held on an indoor hard court at The O2 Arena in London, England from 23 until 25 September.

This tournament marked the retirement of 20-time major singles champion and former singles world No. 1, Roger Federer. The former champion partnered longtime rival Rafael Nadal in the opening doubles match, and was narrowly defeated in a third-set super tiebreak against Jack Sock and Frances Tiafoe.

Team World won the title for the first time.

== Player selection ==
On 3 February 2022, Rafael Nadal and Roger Federer were the first players to confirm their participation for Team Europe.

On 17 June 2022, Félix Auger-Aliassime, Taylor Fritz and Diego Schwartzman were the first players confirmed for Team World. On 29 June 2022, Andy Murray announced he would make his Laver Cup debut for Team Europe.

Novak Djokovic was announced as the fourth player for Team Europe on 22 July 2022, completing the Big Four lineup for the event.

On 2 August 2022, organizers announced that Jack Sock would join Team World. On 10 August 2022, Team Europe announced its final line-up with Stefanos Tsitsipas and Casper Ruud also taking part. Team World captain John McEnroe chose John Isner and Alex de Minaur as his final picks on 25 August 2022. However, Isner withdrew due to injury. As a result, he was replaced by Frances Tiafoe.

Federer played his 1750th (singles and doubles combined) and last match on the ATP Tour in doubles partnering Nadal on Day 1, and was replaced by alternate Matteo Berrettini from Day 2. Nadal also withdrew after Day 1; his place was taken by Cameron Norrie.

== Prize money ==
The total prize money for 2022 Laver Cup was set at $2,250,000 for all 12 participating players.

Each winning team member pocketed $250,000, the same amount as in the 2021 Laver Cup. Each losing team member received $125,000.

== Participants ==
Team Europe
Captain: (Sweden) Björn Borg
Vice-captain: (Sweden) Thomas Enqvist
Player	Rank
(Norway) Casper Ruud	2
(Spain) Rafael Nadal	3
(Greece) Stefanos Tsitsipas	6
(Serbia) Novak Djokovic	7
(Switzerland) Roger Federer	9^{PR(NR)}
(United Kingdom) Andy Murray	43
(Italy) Matteo Berrettini	15
(United Kingdom) Cameron Norrie	8

Team World
Captain: (United States) John McEnroe
Vice-captain: (United States) Patrick McEnroe
Player	Rank
(United States) Taylor Fritz	12
(Canada) Félix Auger-Aliassime	13
(Argentina) Diego Schwartzman	17
(United States) Frances Tiafoe	19
(Australia) Alex de Minaur	22
(United States) ~~John Isner~~	42
(United States) Jack Sock	128
(United States) Tommy Paul	29

Withdrew prior to tournament (substituted by replacements)
Replacement
Withdrew after Day 1 of tournament (substituted by alternates)
Alternate (substituted)
Alternate (not substituted)

- Singles rankings as of 19 September 2022
- PR = Protected ranking
- NR = Not ranked
Team Europe

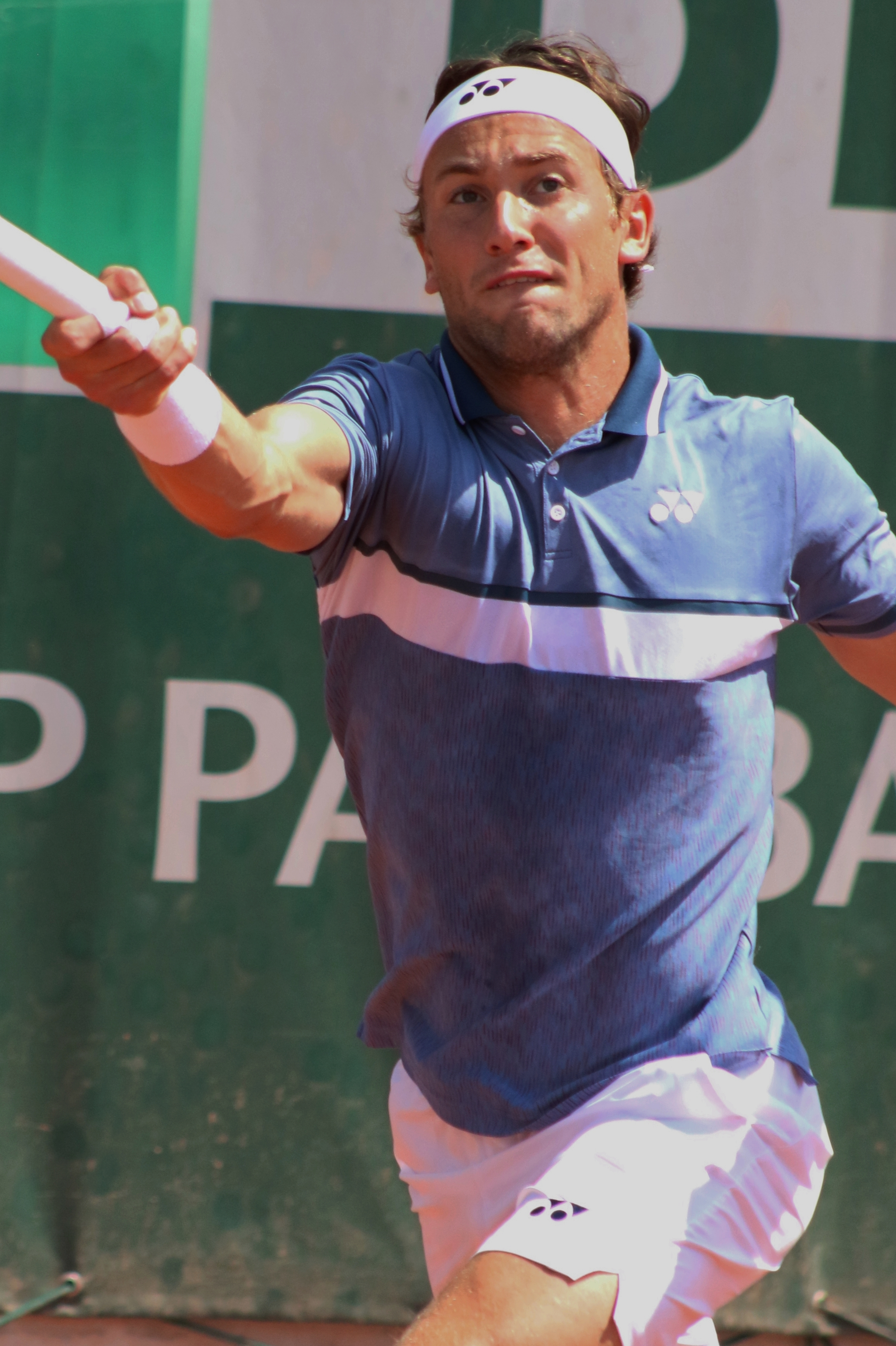
Ruud

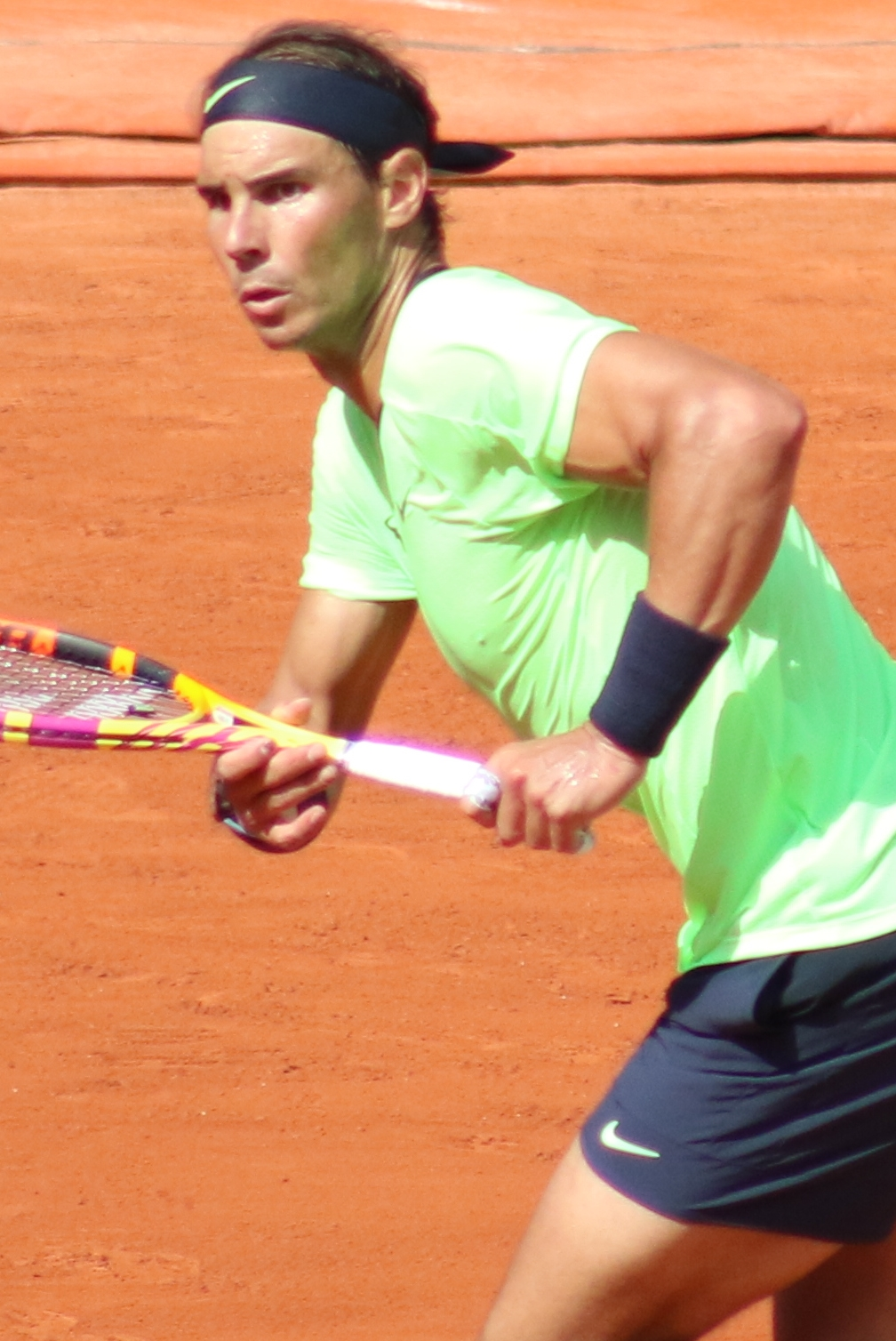
Nadal

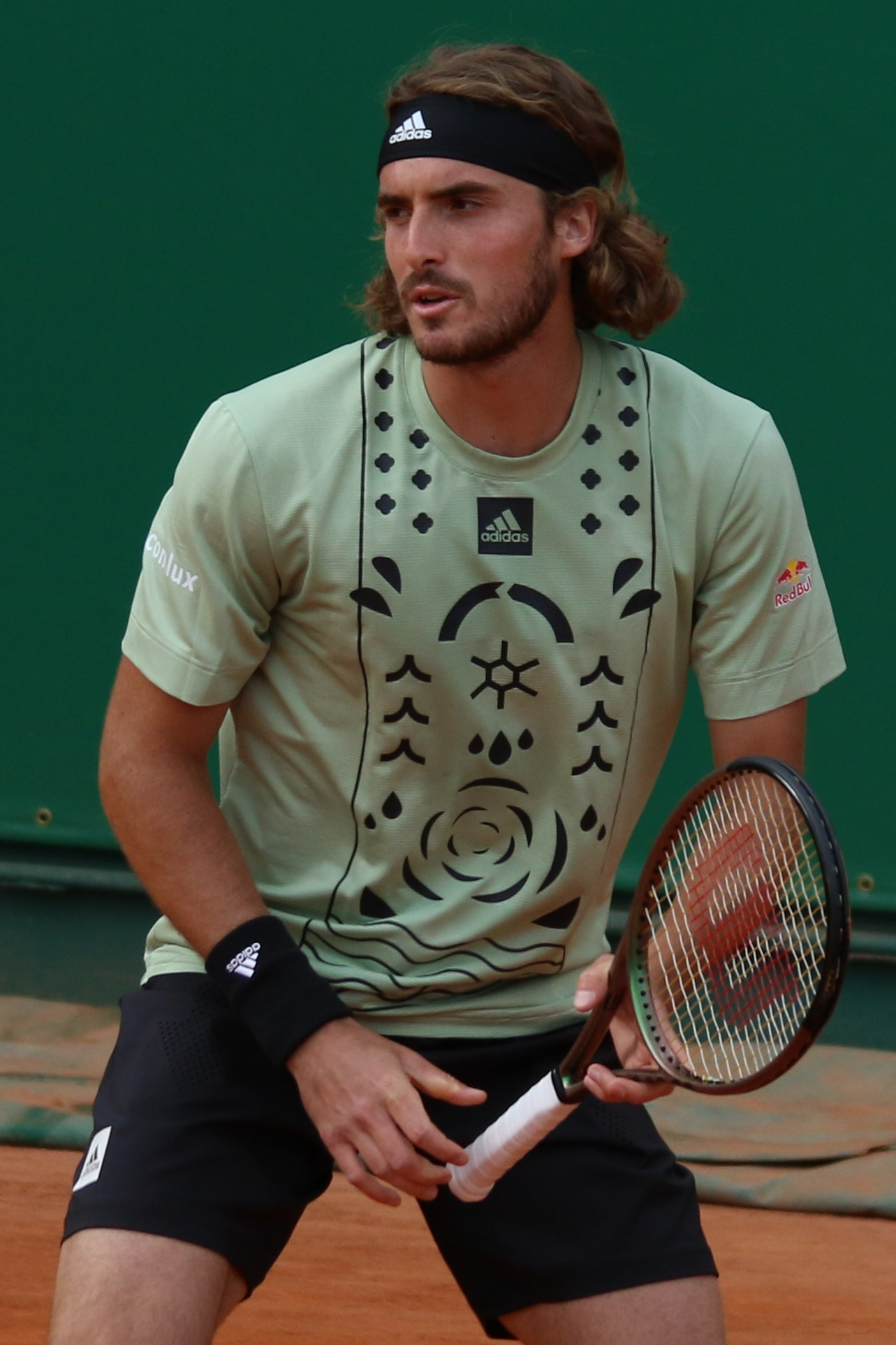
Tsitsipas

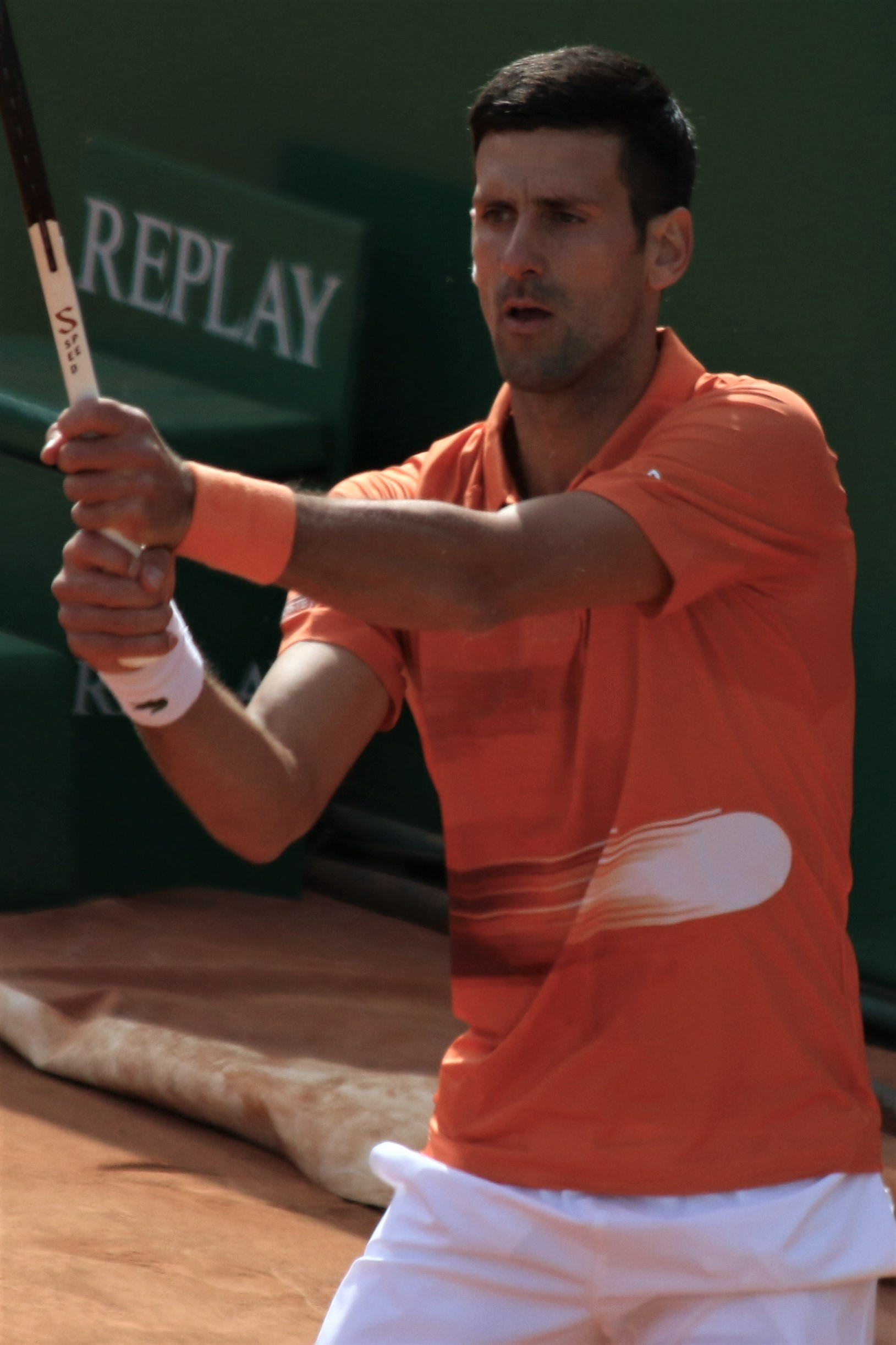
Djokovic

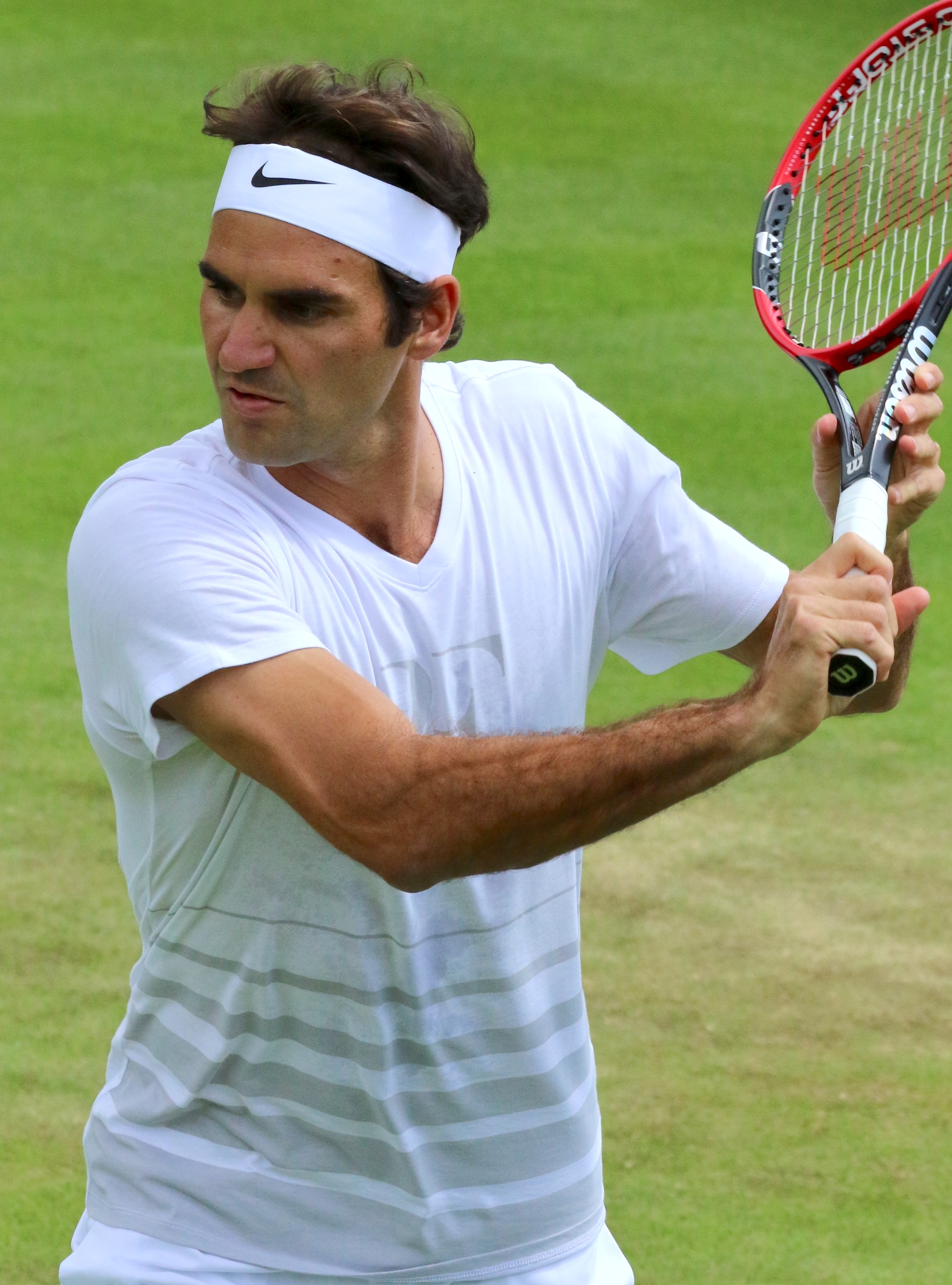
Federer

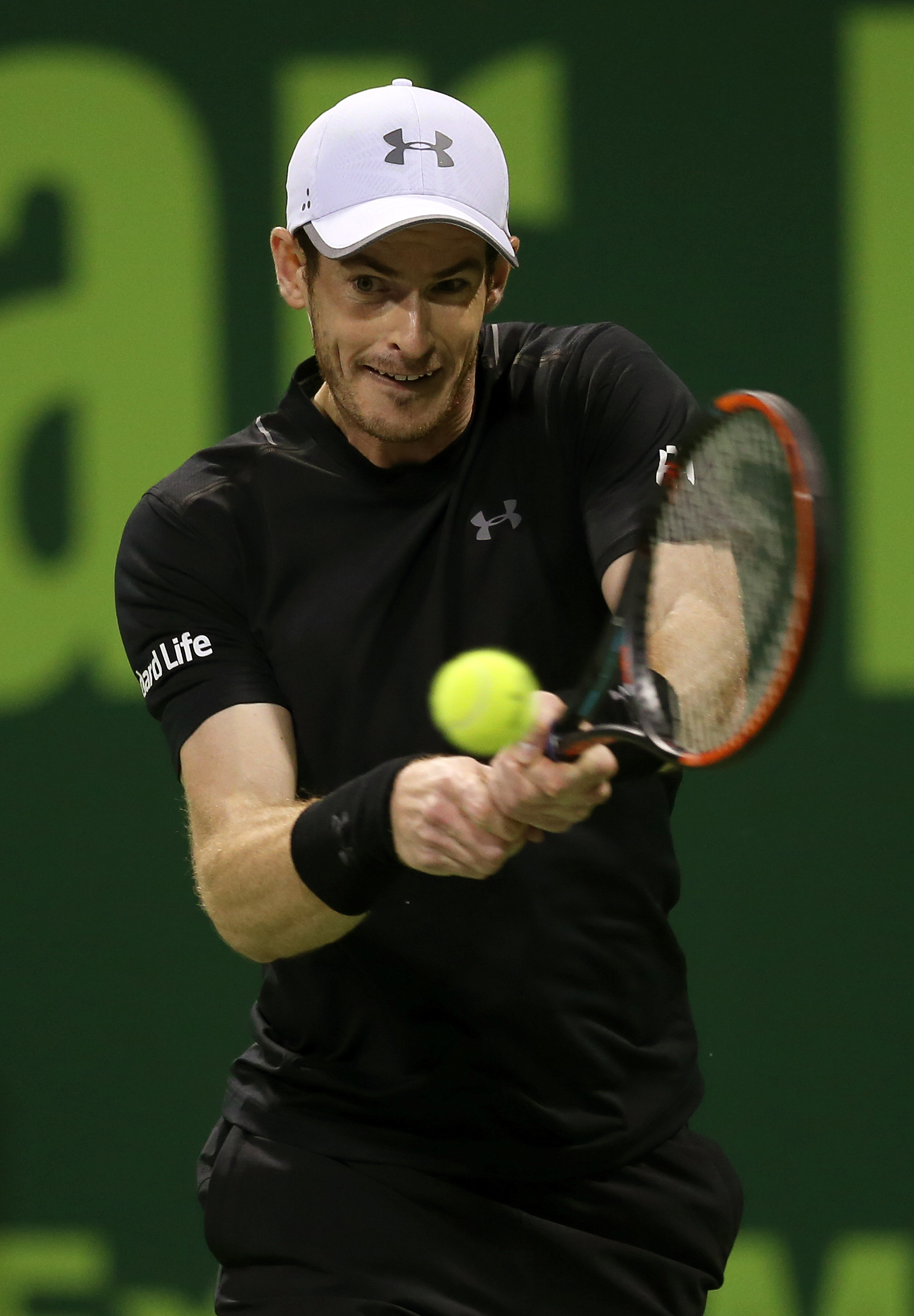
Murray

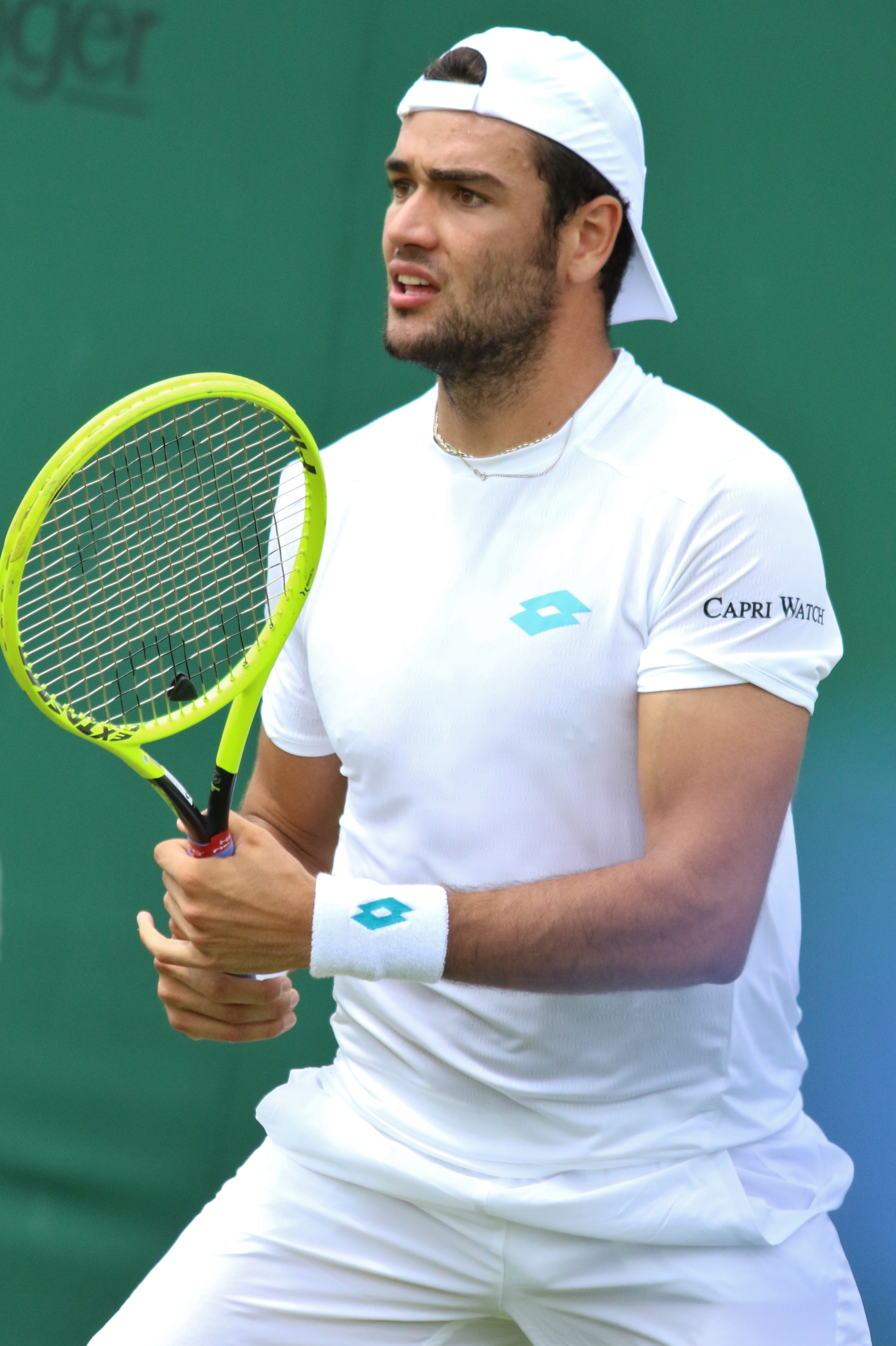
Berrettini

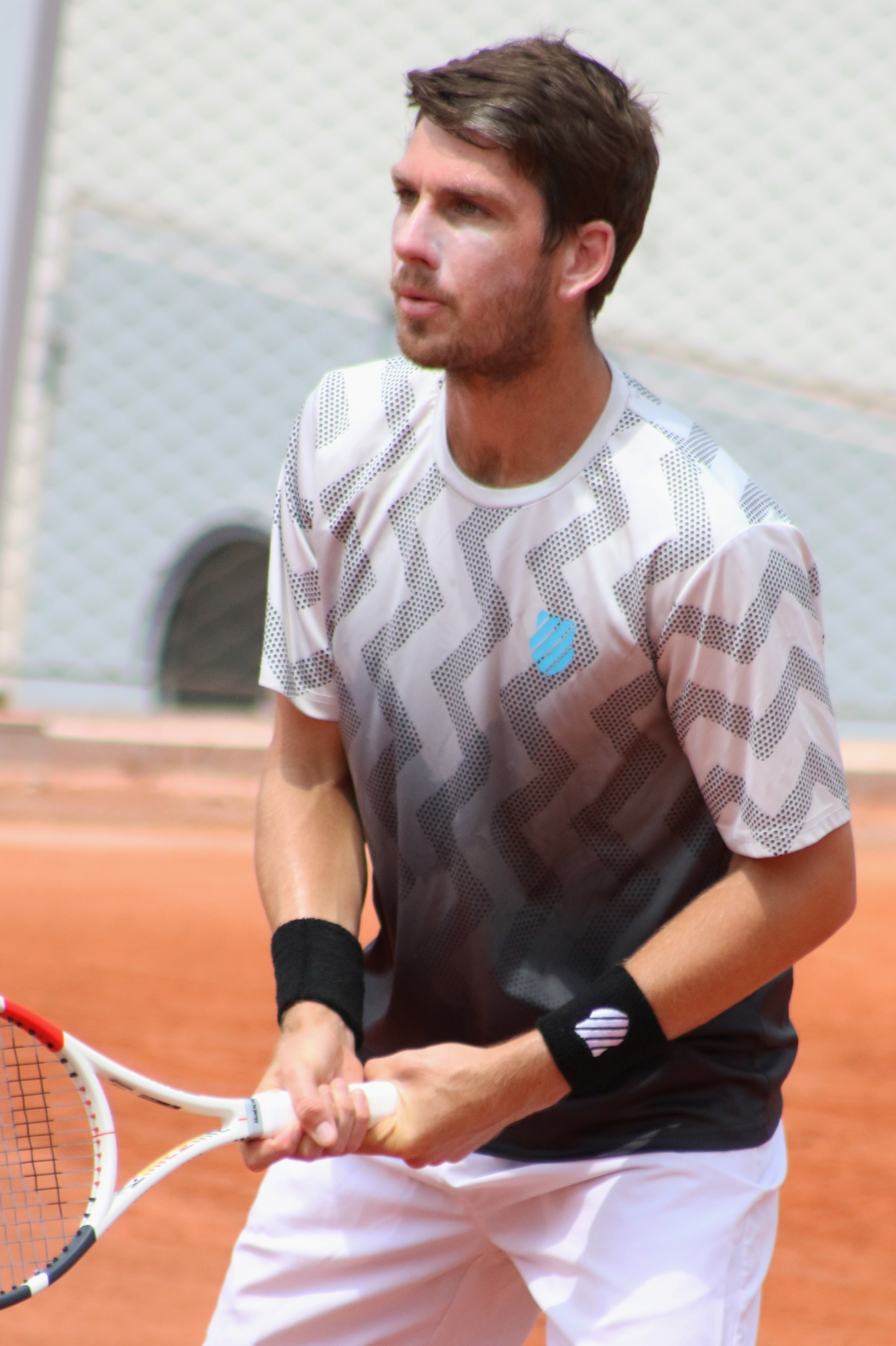
Norrie

Team World

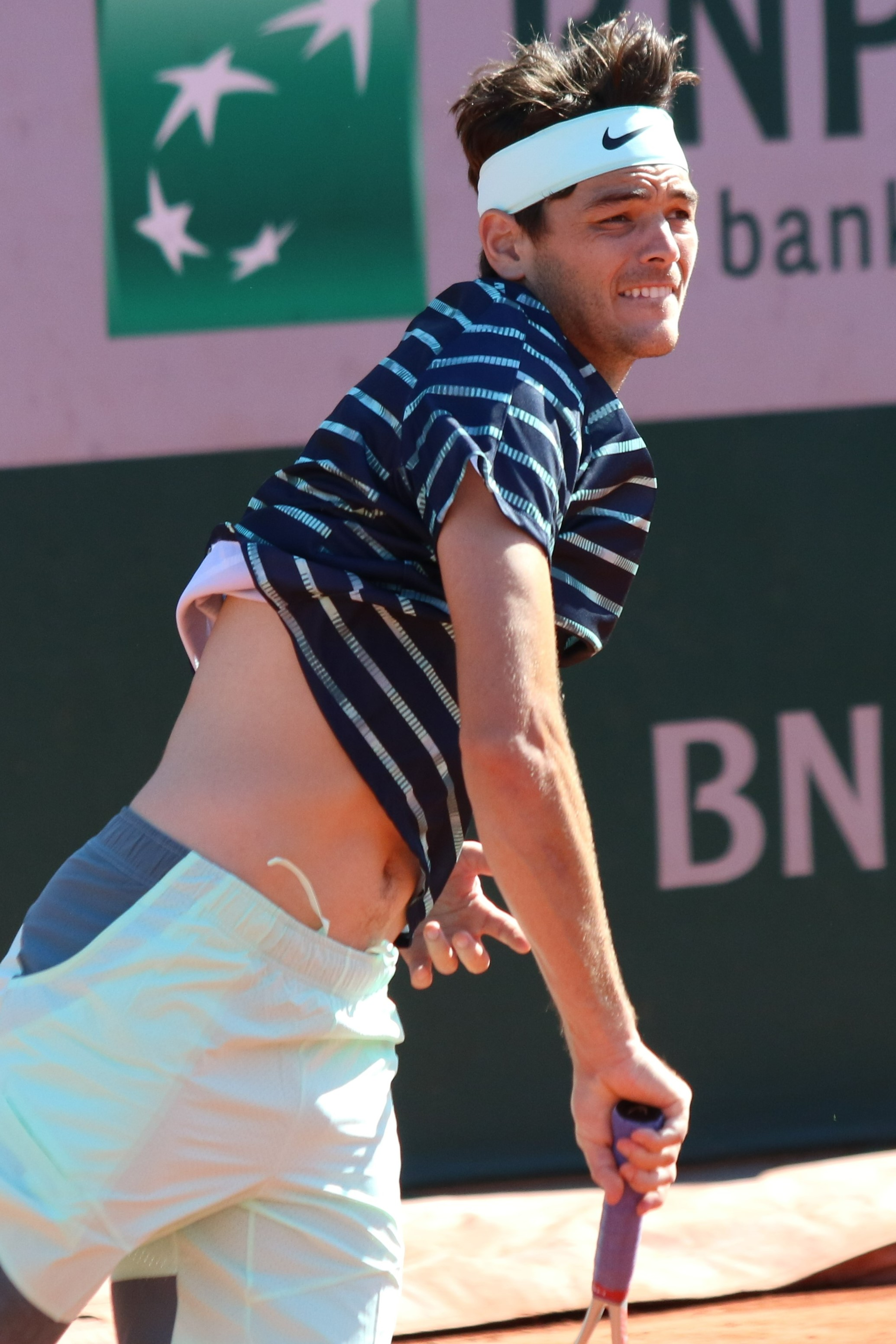
Fritz

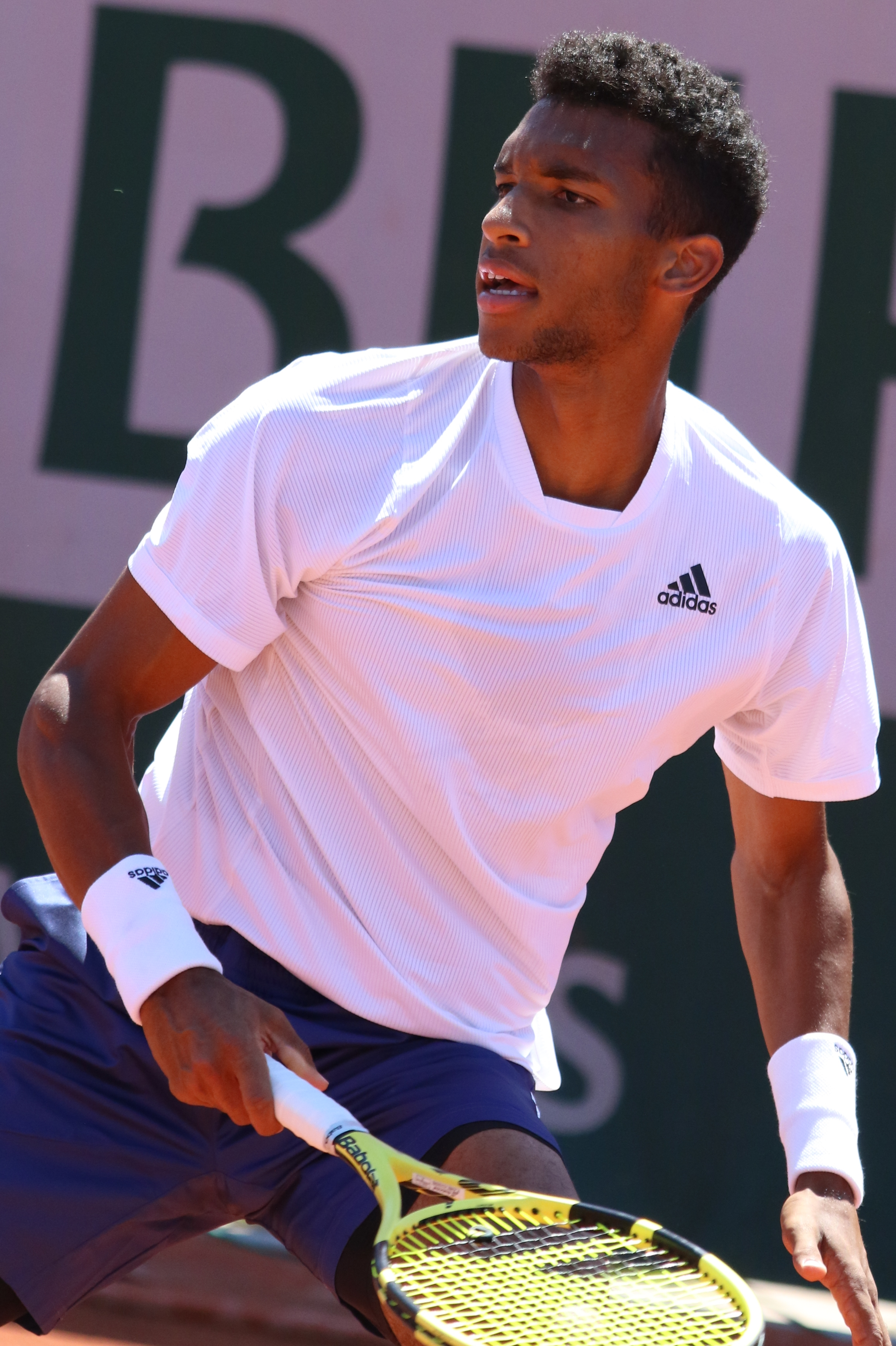
Auger-Aliass.

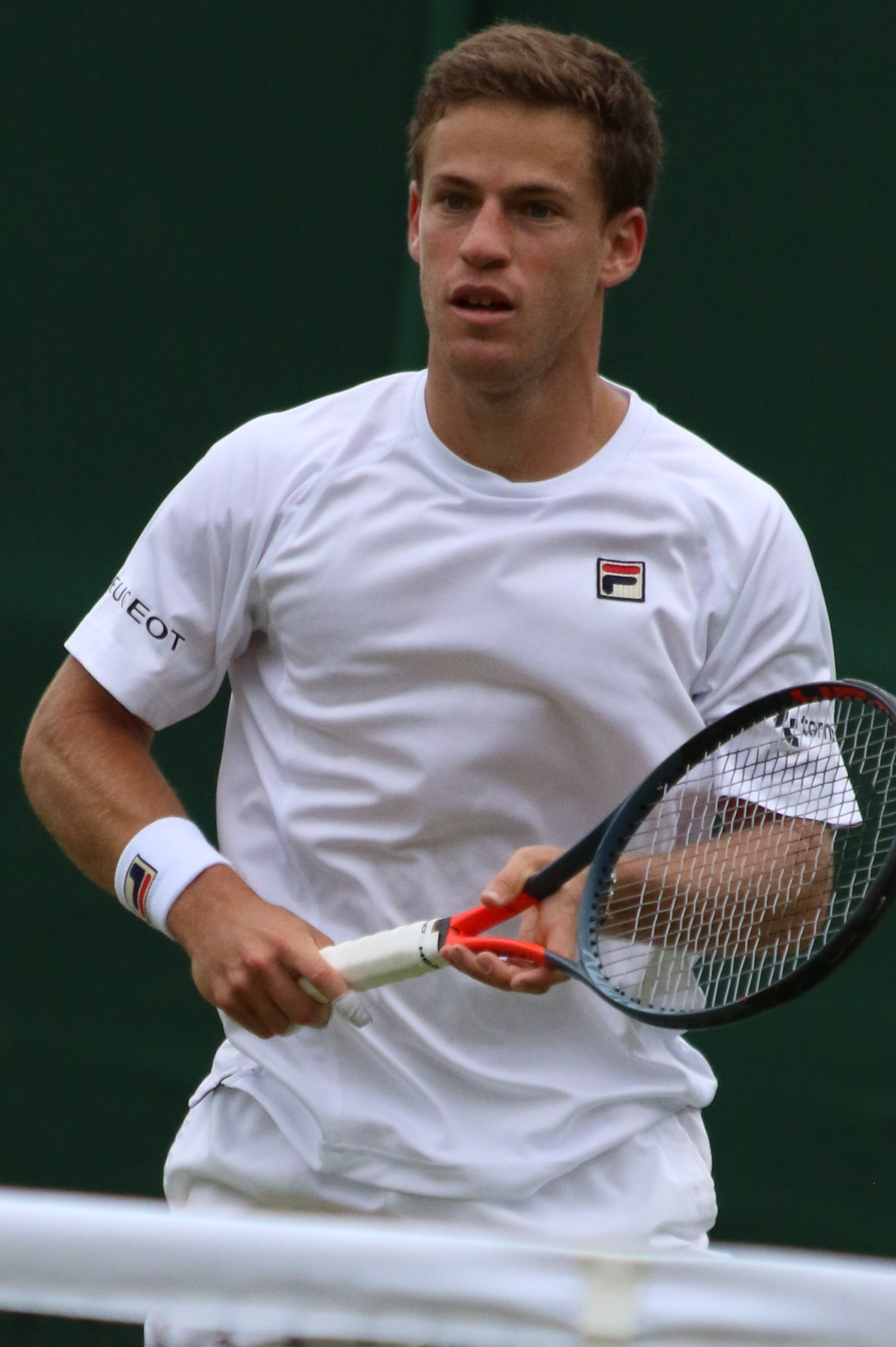
Schwartzman

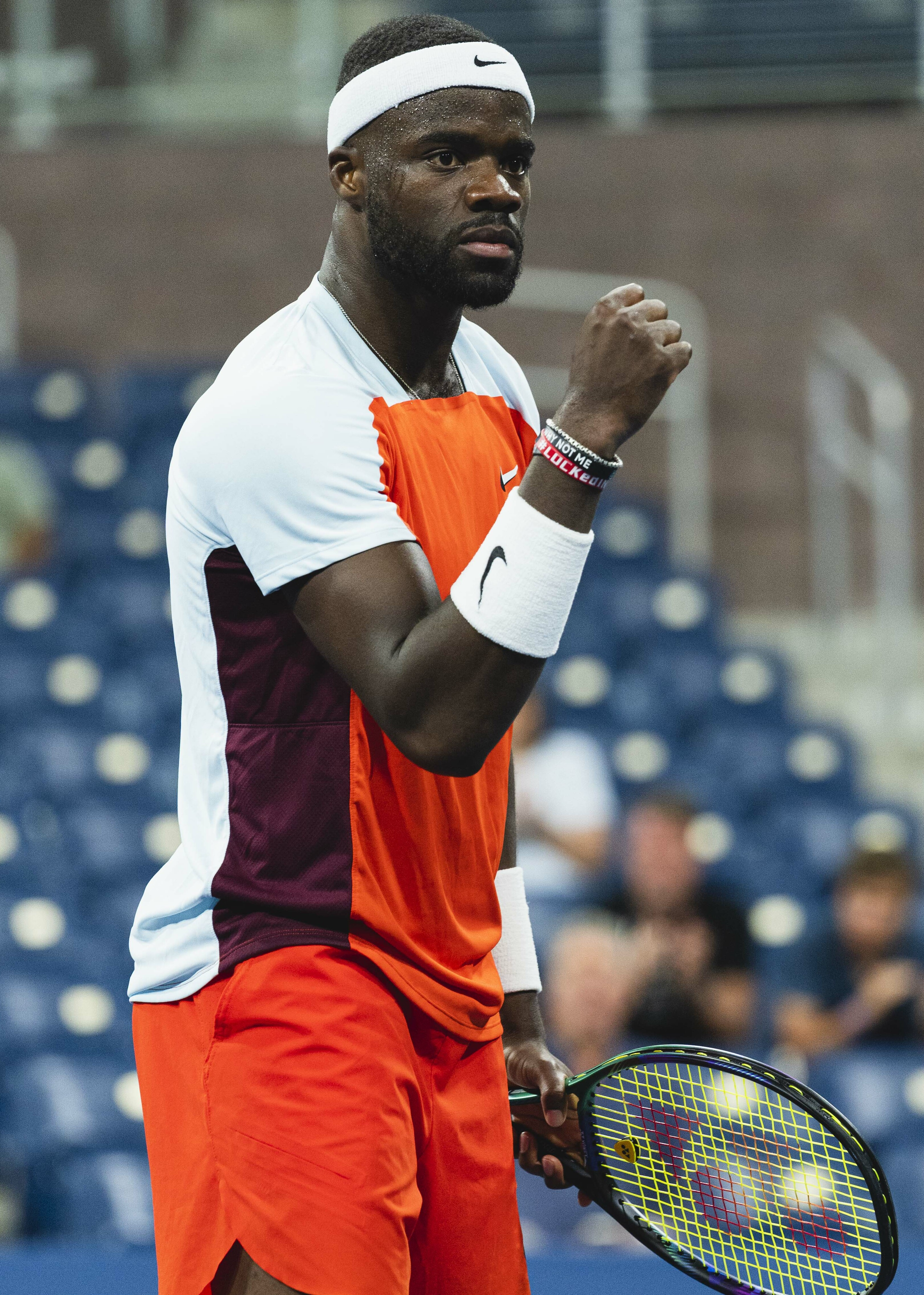
Tiafoe

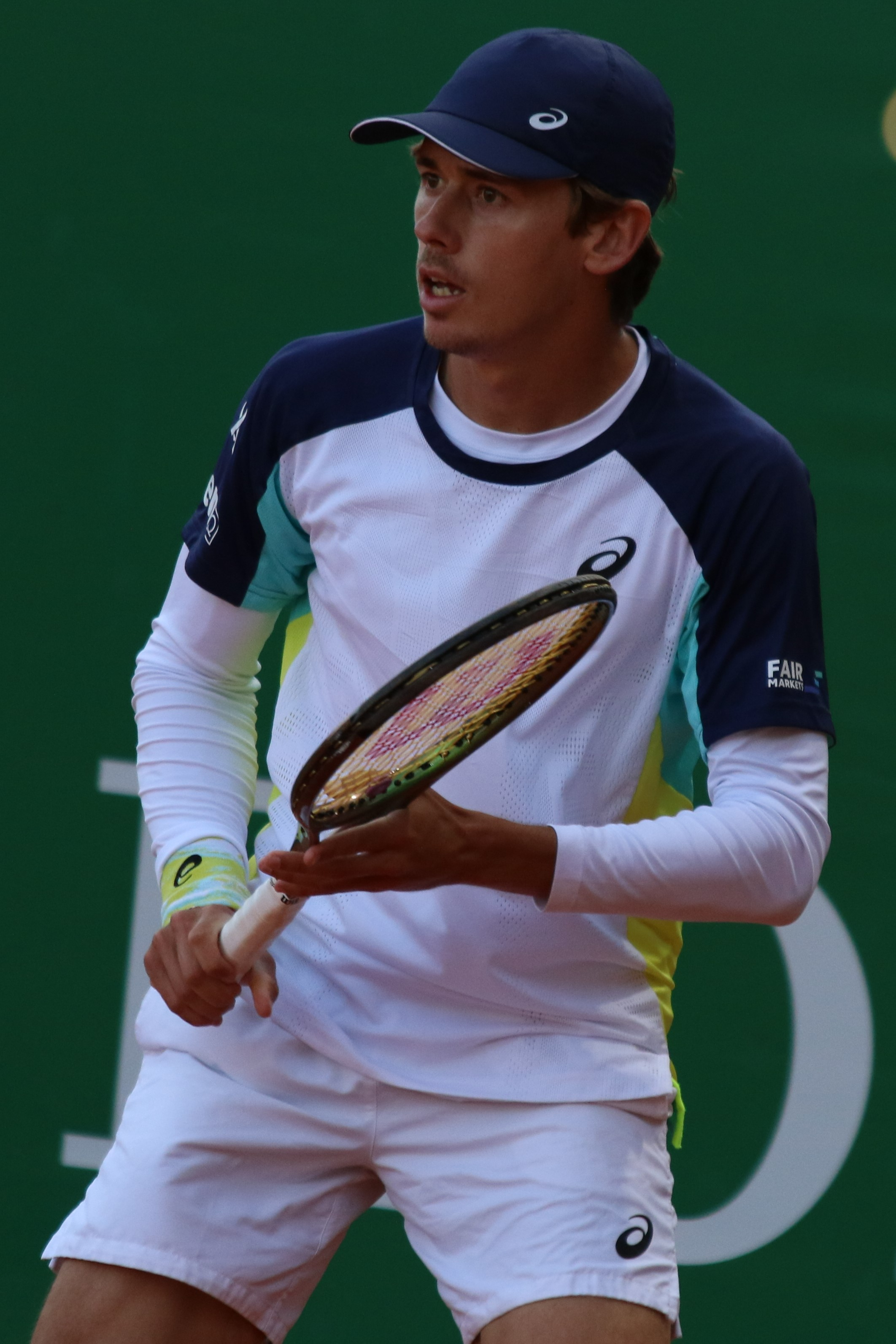
de Minaur

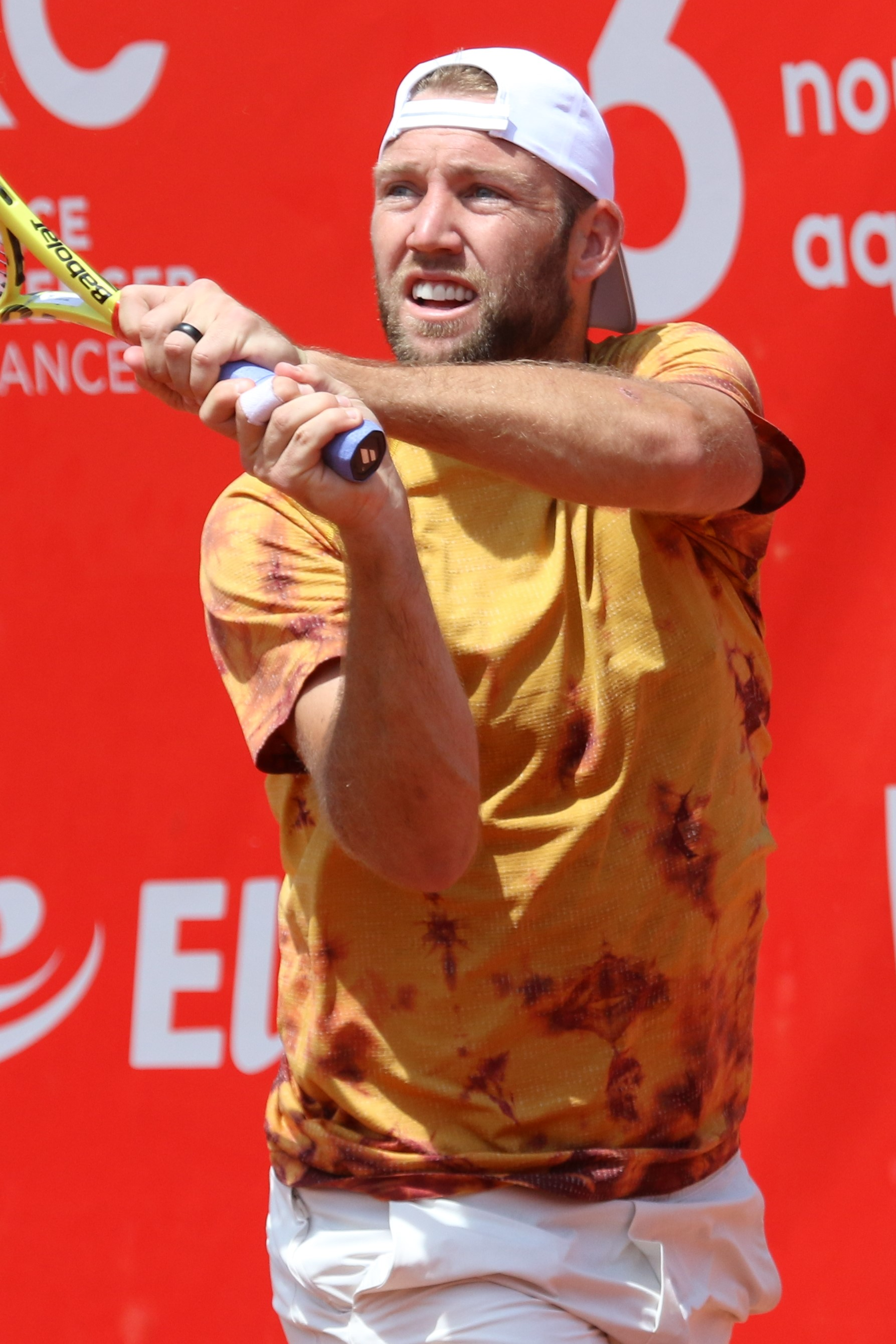
Sock

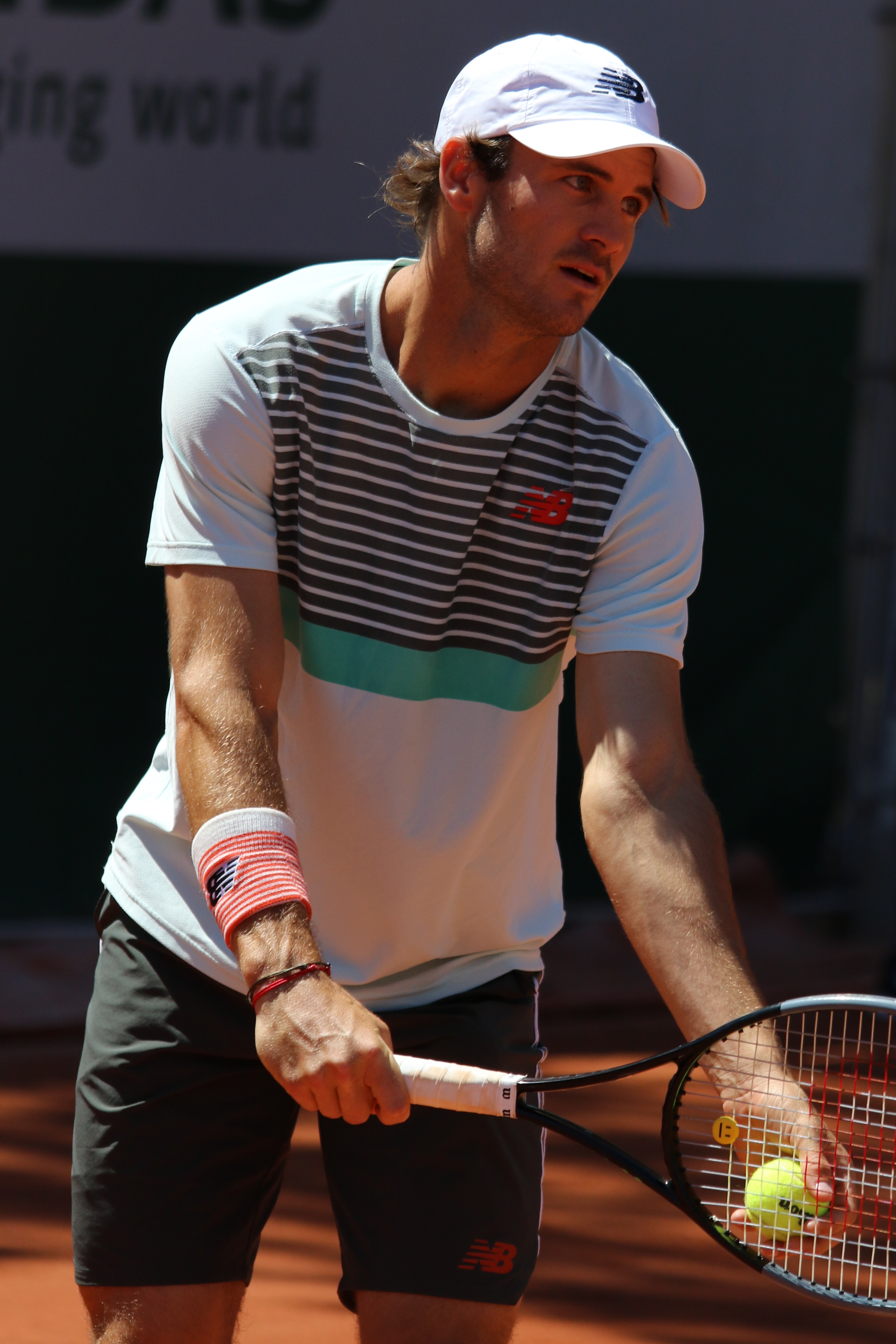
Paul

== Matches ==
Each match win on day 1 was worth one point, on day 2 two points, and on day 3 three points. The first team to 13 points won.

Day	Date	Match type	Team Europe	Team World	Score	Team points after match
1	23 Sep	Singles	(Norway) Casper Ruud	(United States) Jack Sock	6–4, 5–7, [10–7]	1–0
1	23 Sep	Singles	(Greece) Stefanos Tsitsipas	(Argentina) Diego Schwartzman	6–2, 6–1	2–0
1	23 Sep	Singles	(United Kingdom) Andy Murray	(Australia) Alex de Minaur	7–5, 3–6, [7–10]	2–1
1	23 Sep	Doubles	(Switzerland) R Federer / (Spain) R Nadal	(United States) J Sock / (United States) F Tiafoe	6–4, 6–7^{(2–7)}, [9–11]	2–2
2	24 Sep	Singles	(Italy) Matteo Berrettini	(Canada) Félix Auger-Aliassime	7–6^{(13–11)}, 4–6, [10–7]	4–2
2	24 Sep	Singles	(United Kingdom) Cameron Norrie	(United States) Taylor Fritz	1–6, 6–4, [8–10]	4–4
2	24 Sep	Singles	(Serbia) Novak Djokovic	(United States) Frances Tiafoe	6–1, 6–3	6–4
2	24 Sep	Doubles	(Italy) M Berrettini / (Serbia) N Djokovic	(Australia) A de Minaur / (United States) J Sock	7–5, 6–2	8–4
3	25 Sep	Doubles	(Italy) M Berrettini / (United Kingdom) A Murray	(Canada) F Auger-Aliassime / (United States) J Sock	6–2, 3–6, [8–10]	8–7
3	25 Sep	Singles	(Serbia) Novak Djokovic	(Canada) Félix Auger-Aliassime	3–6, 6–7^{(3–7)}	8–10
3	25 Sep	Singles	(Greece) Stefanos Tsitsipas	(United States) Frances Tiafoe	6–1, 6–7^{(11–13)}, [8–10]	8–13
3	25 Sep	Singles	(Norway) Casper Ruud	(United States) Taylor Fritz	not played	

== Player statistics ==
Player	Team	Nat.	Matches	Matches win–loss			Points win–loss		
Player	Team	Nat.	Matches	Singles	Doubles	Total	Singles	Doubles	Total
Félix Auger-Aliassime	World	(Canada)	3	1–1	1–0	2–1	3–2	3–0	6–2
Matteo Berrettini	Europe	(Italy)	3	1–0	1–1	2–1	2–0	2–3	4–3
Alex de Minaur	World	(Australia)	2	1–0	0–1	1–1	1–0	0–2	1–2
Novak Djokovic	Europe	(Serbia)	3	1–1	1–0	2–1	2–3	2–0	4–3
Roger Federer	Europe	(Switzerland)	1	0–0	0–1	0–1	0–0	0–1	0–1
Taylor Fritz	World	(United States)	1	1–0	0–0	1–0	2–0	0–0	2–0
Andy Murray	Europe	(United Kingdom)	2	0–1	0–1	0–2	0–1	0–3	0–4
Rafael Nadal	Europe	(Spain)	1	0–0	0–1	0–1	0–0	0–1	0–1
Cameron Norrie	Europe	(United Kingdom)	1	0–1	0–0	0–1	0–2	0–0	0–2
Casper Ruud	Europe	(Norway)	1	1–0	0–0	1–0	1–0	0–0	1–0
Diego Schwartzman	World	(Argentina)	1	0–1	0–0	0–1	0–1	0–0	0–1
Jack Sock	World	(United States)	4	0–1	2–1	2–2	0–1	4–2	4–3
Frances Tiafoe	World	(United States)	3	1–1	1–0	2–1	3–2	1–0	4–2
Stefanos Tsitsipas	Europe	(Greece)	2	1–1	0–0	1–1	1–3	0–0	1–3
