= 2022 Firenze Open – Singles =

Singles
- 2022 Firenze Open

Final
- Champion: (Canada) Félix Auger-Aliassime
- Runner-up: (United States) J. J. Wolf
- Score: 6–4, 6–4

Details
- Draw: 28 (4 Q / 3 WC )
- Seeds: 8

Events
Singles	Doubles
Firenze Open	· 2023 →

Félix Auger-Aliassime defeated J. J. Wolf in the final, 6–4, 6–4 to win the singles tennis title at the 2022 Firenze Open. It was his second ATP Tour singles title.

This was the first edition of an ATP Tour event in Florence since 1994.

== Seeds ==
The top four seeds received a bye into the second round.

1. (Canada) Félix Auger-Aliassime (champion)
2. (Italy) Matteo Berrettini (second round)
3. (Italy) Lorenzo Musetti (semifinals)
4. (United States) Maxime Cressy (second round)
5. Aslan Karatsev (second round)
6. (United States) Jenson Brooksby (first round)
7. (Kazakhstan) Alexander Bublik (quarterfinals)
8. (United States) Brandon Nakashima (quarterfinals)

== Draw ==
=== Key ===
- Q = Qualifier
- WC = Wild card
- LL = Lucky loser
- Alt = Alternate
- SE = Special exempt
- PR = Protected ranking
- ITF = ITF entry
- JE = Junior exempt
- w/o = Walkover
- r = Retired
- d = Defaulted
- SR = Special ranking

=== Finals ===
Semifinals
1	(Canada) Félix Auger-Aliassime	6	6
3	(Italy) Lorenzo Musetti	2	3
(United States) J. J. Wolf	6	6
Q	(Sweden) Mikael Ymer	4	4

Final
1	(Canada) Félix Auger-Aliassime	6	6
(United States) J. J. Wolf	4	4

=== Top half ===
First round
(Hungary) M Fucsovics	6	4	2
(Germany) O Otte	3	6	6
WC	(Italy) G Zeppieri	3	2
Q	(Turkey) A Çelikbilek	6	6
(France) R Gasquet	2	2
8	(United States) B Nakashima	6	6
(Italy) L Sonego	4	4
(Spain) B Zapata Miralles	6	6
LL	(China) Z Zhang	6^{4}	6^{6}
WC	(Italy) F Passaro	7^{7}	7^{8}
(United States) M McDonald	6	4	6
6	(United States) J Brooksby	4	6	1

Second round
1	(Canada) F Auger-Aliassime	6	6^{2}	6
(Germany) O Otte	4	7^{7}	2
Q	(Turkey) A Çelikbilek	3	4
8	(United States) B Nakashima	6	6
3	(Italy) L Musetti	6	6
(Spain) B Zapata Miralles	3	0
WC	(Italy) F Passaro	4	5
(United States) M McDonald	6	7

Quarterfinals
1	(Canada) F Auger-Aliassime	6	6
8	(United States) B Nakashima	3	4
3	(Italy) L Musetti	6	6
(United States) M McDonald	3	2

Semifinals
1	(Canada) F Auger-Aliassime	6	6
3	(Italy) L Musetti	2	3

=== Bottom half ===
First round
7	(Kazakhstan) A Bublik	7	6
(Chile) C Garín	5	2
Q	(Italy) F Cobolli	6	5	4
(France) C Moutet	4	7	6
(United States) J. J. Wolf	4	6	6
WC	(Italy) F Maestrelli	6	2	1
5	A Karatsev	6	2
(Netherlands) T Griekspoor	3	1^{r}
Q	(Netherlands) T van Rijthoven	1	2
Q	(Sweden) M Ymer	6	6
(Colombia) DE Galán	2	1
(Spain) R Carballés Baena	6	6

Second round
7	(Kazakhstan) A Bublik	7	6
(France) C Moutet	5	4
(United States) J. J. Wolf	6	6
4	(United States) M Cressy	3	4
5	A Karatsev	1	7^{8}	1
Q	(Sweden) M Ymer	6	6^{6}	6
(Spain) R Carballés Baena	5	7^{7}	7
2	(Italy) M Berrettini	7	6^{5}	5

Quarterfinals
7	(Kazakhstan) A Bublik	6	5	1
(United States) J. J. Wolf	3	7	6
Q	(Sweden) M Ymer	6	6
(Spain) R Carballés Baena	4	2

Semifinals
(United States) J. J. Wolf	6	6
Q	(Sweden) M Ymer	4	4

== Qualifying ==
=== Seeds ===
1. Roman Safiullin (first round)
2. (Sweden) Mikael Ymer (qualified)
3. (Netherlands) Tim van Rijthoven (qualified)
4. (China) Zhang Zhizhen (qualifying competition, lucky loser)
5. (Italy) Flavio Cobolli (qualified)
6. (Bosnia and Herzegovina) Damir Džumhur (first round)
7. (Croatia) Borna Gojo (qualifying competition)
8. (Italy) Andrea Vavassori (qualifying competition)

=== Qualifiers ===
1. (Turkey) Altuğ Çelikbilek
2. (Sweden) Mikael Ymer
3. (Netherlands) Tim van Rijthoven
4. (Italy) Flavio Cobolli

=== Lucky Loser ===
1. (China) Zhang Zhizhen

=== Qualifying draw ===
==== First qualifier ====
First round
1	Roman Safiullin	6^{4}	1
(Turkey) Altuğ Çelikbilek	7^{7}	6
(Croatia) Nino Serdarušić	6^{2}	6	3
8	(Italy) Andrea Vavassori	7^{7}	4	6

Qualifying competition
(Turkey) Altuğ Çelikbilek	6	6
8	(Italy) Andrea Vavassori	1	4

==== Second qualifier ====
First round
2	(Sweden) Mikael Ymer	7	6
(Italy) Andreas Seppi	5	3
(Romania) Marius Copil	3	7^{7}	6^{2}
7	(Croatia) Borna Gojo	6	6^{5}	7^{7}

Qualifying competition
2	(Sweden) Mikael Ymer	4	6	6
7	(Croatia) Borna Gojo	6	4	4

==== Third qualifier ====
First round
3	(Netherlands) Tim van Rijthoven	6	6
(Tunisia) Aziz Dougaz	4	4
WC	(Italy) Gianmarco Ferrari	6	6^{6}	6
6	(Bosnia and Herzegovina) Damir Džumhur	4	7^{8}	0

Qualifying competition
3	(Netherlands) Tim van Rijthoven	6	7^{7}
WC	(Italy) Gianmarco Ferrari	4	6^{2}

==== Fourth qualifier ====
First round
4	(China) Zhang Zhizhen	6	6
WC	(Italy) Jacopo Berrettini	4	2
(Austria) Lucas Miedler	4	6^{5}
5	(Italy) Flavio Cobolli	6	7^{7}

Qualifying competition
4	(China) Zhang Zhizhen	4	3
5	(Italy) Flavio Cobolli	6	6
