= 2018 Open Sopra Steria de Lyon – Singles =

Singles
- 2018 Open Sopra Steria de Lyon

Final
- Champion: (Canada) Félix Auger-Aliassime
- Runner-up: (France) Johan Tatlot
- Score: 6–7^{(3–7)}, 7–5, 6–2

Events
| Singles | Doubles |
| ← 2017 · | Open Sopra Steria de Lyon | · 2019 → |

Félix Auger-Aliassime was the defending champion and successfully defended his title.

Auger-Aliassime won the title after defeating Johan Tatlot 6–7^{(3–7)}, 7–5, 6–2 in the final.

== Seeds ==
1. (Spain) Roberto Carballés Baena (first round)
2. (Austria) Gerald Melzer (first round)
3. (Portugal) Pedro Sousa (first round)
4. (Spain) Pablo Andújar (second round, retired)
5. (France) Quentin Halys (first round)
6. (Switzerland) Henri Laaksonen (first round)
7. (Russia) Alexey Vatutin (first round)
8. (France) Corentin Moutet (first round)

== Draw ==
=== Key ===
- Q = Qualifier
- WC = Wild card
- LL = Lucky loser
- Alt = Alternate
- SE = Special exempt
- PR = Protected ranking
- ITF = ITF entry
- JE = Junior exempt
- w/o = Walkover
- r = Retired
- d = Defaulted
- SR = Special ranking

=== Finals ===
Semifinals
(Serbia) Miomir Kecmanović | 2 | 6^{6}
(Canada) Félix Auger-Aliassime | 6 | 7^{8}
Q | (France) Johan Tatlot | 7^{7} | 6
Q | (Italy) Roberto Marcora | 6^{1} | 2

Final
(Canada) Félix Auger-Aliassime | 6^{3} | 7 | 6
Q | (France) Johan Tatlot | 7^{7} | 5 | 2

=== Top half ===
First round
1 | (Spain) R Carballés Baena | 3 | 5
Q | (Sweden) M Ymer | 6 | 7
(Spain) M Vilella Martínez | 4 | 3
(Serbia) M Kecmanović | 6 | 6
WC | (Australia) A Popyrin | 6 | 6
(Czech Republic) V Šafránek | 3 | 3
(France) M Bourgue | 7^{8} | 1 | 7
6 | (Switzerland) H Laaksonen | 6^{6} | 6 | 5
3 | (Portugal) P Sousa | 5 | 3
WC | (France) A Müller | 7 | 6
(France) K de Schepper | 7 | 2 | 3
(Portugal) J Domingues | 5 | 6 | 6
(Dominican Republic) J Hernández-Fernández | 2 | 2
(France) A Hoang | 6 | 6
(Canada) F Auger-Aliassime | 6 | 6
8/WC | (France) C Moutet | 2 | 2

Second round
Q | (Sweden) M Ymer | 2 | 6^{7}
(Serbia) M Kecmanović | 6 | 7^{9}
WC | (Australia) A Popyrin | 6 | 6
(France) M Bourgue | 4 | 4
WC | (France) A Müller | 2 | 7 | 6
(Portugal) J Domingues | 6 | 5 | 4
(France) A Hoang | 3 | 5
(Canada) F Auger-Aliassime | 6 | 7

Quarterfinals
(Serbia) M Kecmanović | 7 | 2 | 6
WC | (Australia) A Popyrin | 5 | 6 | 4
WC | (France) A Müller | 3 | 1
(Canada) F Auger-Aliassime | 6 | 6

Semifinals
(Serbia) M Kecmanović | 2 | 6^{6}
(Canada) F Auger-Aliassime | 6 | 7^{8}

=== Bottom half ===
First round
7 | (Russia) A Vatutin | 1 | 3
(Colombia) DE Galán | 6 | 6
WC | (France) E Benchetrit | 5 | 4
Q | (France) J Tatlot | 7 | 6
(France) G Sakharov | 1 | 1
(Czech Republic) A Pavlásek | 6 | 6
(Ecuador) R Quiroz | 2 | 5
4 | (Spain) P Andújar | 6 | 7
5 | (France) Q Halys | 7 | 4 | 2
Q | (Italy) R Marcora | 5 | 6 | 6
(France) B Bonzi | 6 | 6
Q | (France) T Lamasine | 3 | 4
(United States) M Krueger | 6 | 1 | 6
(Spain) P Martínez | 4 | 6 | 0
(Chile) C Garín | 6 | 6
2 | (Austria) G Melzer | 3 | 3

Second round
(Colombia) DE Galán | 6 | 2 | 4
Q | (France) J Tatlot | 3 | 6 | 6
(Czech Republic) A Pavlásek | 7^{7} | 0 | 6
4 | (Spain) P Andújar | 6^{5} | 6 | 5^{r}
Q | (Italy) R Marcora | 6 | 7^{7}
(France) B Bonzi | 0 | 6^{4}
(United States) M Krueger | 6 | 3 | 5
(Chile) C Garín | 3 | 6 | 7

Quarterfinals
Q | (France) J Tatlot | 1 | 7^{7} | 6
(Czech Republic) A Pavlásek | 6 | 6^{3} | 3
Q | (Italy) R Marcora | 6 | 3 | 6
(Chile) C Garín | 1 | 6 | 4

Semifinals
Q | (France) J Tatlot | 7^{7} | 6
Q | (Italy) R Marcora | 6^{1} | 2
