= 2019 Open Sopra Steria de Lyon – Doubles =

Doubles
- 2019 Open Sopra Steria de Lyon

Final
- Champions: (Austria) Philipp Oswald (Slovakia) Filip Polášek
- Runners-up: (Italy) Simone Bolelli (Italy) Andrea Pellegrino
- Score: 6–4, 7–6^{(7–2)}

Events
| Singles | Doubles |
| ← 2018 · | Open Sopra Steria de Lyon | · 2021 → |

Elliot Benchetrit and Geoffrey Blancaneaux were the defending champions but only Benchetrit chose to defend his title, partnering Johan Tatlot. Benchetrit and Tatlot withdrew before the tournament began.

Philipp Oswald and Filip Polášek won the title after defeating Simone Bolelli and Andrea Pellegrino 6–4, 7–6^{(7–2)} in the final.

== Seeds ==
1. (Belgium) Sander Gillé / (Belgium) Joran Vliegen (first round)
2. (Austria) Philipp Oswald / (Slovakia) Filip Polášek (champions)
3. (Monaco) Hugo Nys / (Brazil) Fernando Romboli (semifinals)
4. (Switzerland) Luca Margaroli / (Austria) Tristan-Samuel Weissborn (quarterfinals)

== Draw ==
=== Key ===
- Q = Qualifier
- WC = Wild card
- LL = Lucky loser
- Alt = Alternate
- SE = Special exempt
- PR = Protected ranking
- ITF = ITF entry
- JE = Junior exempt
- w/o = Walkover
- r = Retired
- d = Defaulted
- SR = Special ranking

First round
1 | (Belgium) S Gillé (Belgium) J Vliegen | 6^{5} | 6 | [7]
(Spain) E López Pérez (Spain) D Marrero | 7^{7} | 2 | [10]
(Sweden) A Siljeström (Sweden) E Ymer | 6 | 3 | [10]
WC | (France) T Lamasine (France) C Moutet | 3 | 6 | [6]
4 | (Switzerland) L Margaroli (Austria) T-S Weissborn | 6 | 3 | [10]
ITF | (Germany) Peter Heller (Australia) S Puodziunas | 4 | 6 | [7]
(Italy) S Bolelli (Italy) A Pellegrino | 6 | 6
(Philippines) R Gonzales (India) V Vardhan | 4 | 4
WC | (France) Antoine Cornut-Chauvinc (France) H Gaston | 4 | 3
(France) B Bonzi (France) J Eysseric | 6 | 6
(Spain) P Martínez (Netherlands) M Vervoort | 4 | 6^{5}
(United States) N Lammons (Croatia) A Šančić | 6 | 7^{7}
ITF | (Spain) Eduard Esteve Lobato (Spain) O Roca Batalla | 4 | 6^{5}
2 | (Austria) P Oswald (Slovakia) F Polášek | 6 | 7^{7}

Quarterfinals
(Spain) E López Pérez (Spain) D Marrero | 7^{7} | 3 | [10]
(Sweden) A Siljeström (Sweden) E Ymer | 6^{2} | 6 | [8]
4 | (Switzerland) L Margaroli (Austria) T-S Weissborn | 1 | 3
(Italy) S Bolelli (Italy) A Pellegrino | 6 | 6
(France) B Bonzi (France) J Eysseric | 6 | 6^{5} | [6]
3 | (Monaco) H Nys (Brazil) F Romboli | 2 | 7^{7} | [10]
(United States) N Lammons (Croatia) A Šančić | 6^{5} | 5
2 | (Austria) P Oswald (Slovakia) F Polášek | 7^{7} | 7

Semifinals
(Spain) E López Pérez (Spain) D Marrero | 2 | 6^{6}
(Italy) S Bolelli (Italy) A Pellegrino | 6 | 7^{8}
3 | (Monaco) H Nys (Brazil) F Romboli | 4 | 1
2 | (Austria) P Oswald (Slovakia) F Polášek | 6 | 6

Final
(Italy) S Bolelli (Italy) A Pellegrino | 4 | 6^{2}
2 | (Austria) P Oswald (Slovakia) F Polášek | 6 | 7^{7}
