= 2024 Open Sopra Steria de Lyon – Doubles =

Doubles
- 2024 Open Sopra Steria de Lyon

Final
- Champions: (France) Manuel Guinard (France) Grégoire Jacq
- Runners-up: (Greece) Markos Kalovelonis (Ukraine) Vladyslav Orlov
- Score: 4–6, 6–3, [10–6]

Events
Singles	Doubles
← 2023 ·	Open Sopra Steria de Lyon	· 2025 →

Manuel Guinard and Grégoire Jacq were the defending champions and successfully defended their title after defeating Markos Kalovelonis and Vladyslav Orlov 4–6, 6–3, [10–6] in the final.

== Seeds ==
1. (France) Jonathan Eysseric / (Netherlands) Bart Stevens (first round)
2. (France) Manuel Guinard / (France) Grégoire Jacq (champions)
3. (Ukraine) Vladyslav Manafov / (France) Luca Sanchez (first round)
4. (Sweden) Filip Bergevi / (Netherlands) Mick Veldheer (semifinals)

== Draw ==
=== Key ===
- Q = Qualifier
- WC = Wild card
- LL = Lucky loser
- Alt = Alternate
- SE = Special exempt
- PR = Protected ranking
- ITF = ITF entry
- JE = Junior exempt
- w/o = Walkover
- r = Retired
- d = Defaulted
- SR = Special ranking

=== Draw ===
First round
1	(France) J Eysseric (Netherlands) B Stevens	6	4	[8]
(Spain) D Jordà Sanchis (Spain) D Vega Hernández	2	6	[10]
(Ukraine) V Uzhylovskyi (Switzerland) D Wenger	3	6	[7]
(France) H Gaston (France) C Tabur	6	3	[10]
3	(Ukraine) V Manafov (France) L Sanchez	4	6^{5}
(New Zealand) R Statham (Canada) K Stevenson	6	7^{7}
WC	(France) M Bourgue (France) C Hemery	3	1
Alt	(Greece) M Kalovelonis (Ukraine) V Orlov	6	6
(United Kingdom) S Duncan (United States) H Reese	7	7^{8}
WC	(France) Antoine Cornut-Chauvinc (France) Joshua Dous Karpenschif	5	6^{6}
(United States) T Boyer (Argentina) JP Ficovich	4	1
4	(Sweden) F Bergevi (Netherlands) M Veldheer	6	6
(Australia) T Fancutt (France) M Janvier	3	6^{5}
(United States) G Goldhoff (Poland) S Walków	6	7^{7}
(United States) M Kiger (United States) A Lawson	1	3
2	(France) M Guinard (France) G Jacq	6	6

Quarterfinals
(Spain) D Jordà Sanchis (Spain) D Vega Hernández	6	6
(France) H Gaston (France) C Tabur	1	4
(New Zealand) R Statham (Canada) K Stevenson	4	3
Alt	(Greece) M Kalovelonis (Ukraine) V Orlov	6	6
(United Kingdom) S Duncan (United States) H Reese	3	6	[2]
4	(Sweden) F Bergevi (Netherlands) M Veldheer	6	3	[10]
(United States) G Goldhoff (Poland) S Walków	5	4
2	(France) M Guinard (France) G Jacq	7	6

Semifinals
(Spain) D Jordà Sanchis (Spain) D Vega Hernández	6	6^{5}	[5]
Alt	(Greece) M Kalovelonis (Ukraine) V Orlov	2	7^{7}	[10]
4	(Sweden) F Bergevi (Netherlands) M Veldheer	6^{5}	6^{6}
2	(France) M Guinard (France) G Jacq	7^{7}	7^{8}

Final
Alt	(Greece) M Kalovelonis (Ukraine) V Orlov	6	3	[6]
2	(France) M Guinard (France) G Jacq	4	6	[10]
