= 2019 Open Sopra Steria de Lyon – Singles =

Singles
- 2019 Open Sopra Steria de Lyon

Final
- Champion: (France) Corentin Moutet
- Runner-up: (Sweden) Elias Ymer
- Score: 6–4, 6–4

Events
Singles	Doubles
- Open Sopra Steria de Lyon

Félix Auger-Aliassime was the defending champion but chose not to defend his title.

Corentin Moutet won the title after defeating Elias Ymer 6–4, 6–4 in the final.

== Seeds ==
All seeds receive a bye into the second round.

1. (Spain) Albert Ramos Viñolas (quarterfinals)
2. (Spain) Pablo Andújar (third round)
3. (France) Corentin Moutet (champion)
4. (Sweden) Elias Ymer (final)
5. (Portugal) Pedro Sousa (third round)
6. (Spain) Pedro Martínez (second round)
7. (Italy) Gianluca Mager (withdrew)
8. (France) Quentin Halys (second round)
9. (Spain) Enrique López Pérez (second round)
10. (Germany) Rudolf Molleker (third round)
11. (Belgium) Kimmer Coppejans (quarterfinals)
12. (Belgium) Arthur De Greef (second round)
13. (France) Maxime Janvier (third round)
14. (France) Constant Lestienne (second round)
15. (Colombia) Daniel Elahi Galán (second round)
16. (Netherlands) Tallon Griekspoor (second round, retired)

== Draw ==
Key

- Q = Qualifier
- WC = Wild card
- LL = Lucky loser
- Alt = Alternate
- ITF = ITF entry
- PR = Protected ranking
- SR = Special ranking
- SE = Special exempt
- JE = Junior exempt
- JR = Junior Accelerator Programme entrant
- CO = College Accelerator Programme entrant
- NG = Next Gen Accelerator Program entrant
- w/o = Walkover
- r = Retired
- d = Defaulted

=== Finals ===
Quarterfinals
1	(Spain) Albert Ramos Viñolas	5	6^{2}
(India) Sumit Nagal	7	7^{7}
4	(Sweden) Elias Ymer	7^{7}	7
11	(Belgium) Kimmer Coppejans	6^{5}	5
(Egypt) Mohamed Safwat	0	2
3	(France) Corentin Moutet	6	6
WC	(France) Manuel Guinard	1	6	1
(Italy) Federico Gaio	6	2	6

Semifinals
(India) Sumit Nagal	1	1
4	(Sweden) Elias Ymer	6	6
3	(France) Corentin Moutet	6	3	6
(Italy) Federico Gaio	0	6	3

Final
4	(Sweden) Elias Ymer	4	4
3	(France) Corentin Moutet	6	6

=== Top half ===
==== Section 1 ====
First round
(Dominican Republic) J Hernández-Fernández	4	0
(France) T Lamasine	6	6
WC	(France) H Gaston	6	6
(Spain) B Zapata Miralles	1	3
ITF	(Spain) Eduard Esteve Lobato	1	0^{r}
(Belarus) U Ignatik	6	0
(India) S Nagal	6	6
Alt	(Monaco) H Nys	4	2

Second round
1	(Spain) A Ramos Viñolas	6	6
(France) T Lamasine	1	2
WC	(France) H Gaston	2	6	0
16	(Netherlands) T Griekspoor	6	4	0^{r}
12	(Belgium) A De Greef	6^{3}	6	6^{4}
(Belarus) U Ignatik	7^{7}	0	7^{7}
(India) S Nagal	6	6
8	(France) Q Halys	3	2

Third round
1	(Spain) A Ramos Viñolas	6	6
WC	(France) H Gaston	2	1
(Belarus) U Ignatik	1	6	3
(India) S Nagal	6	3	6

Quarterfinals
1	(Spain) A Ramos Viñolas	5	6^{2}
(India) S Nagal	7	7^{7}

==== Section 2 ====
First round
(Belgium) S Darcis	6	6
(Slovakia) N Gombos	4	1
(France) M Bourgue	6	6^{5}	6
(Germany) D Masur	4	7^{7}	2
(Spain) R Ortega Olmedo	1	5
(France) E Benchetrit	6	7
(Czech Republic) Z Kolář	5	4
(France) J Tatlot	7	6

Second round
4	(Sweden) E Ymer	6	6
(Belgium) S Darcis	1	3
(France) M Bourgue
13	(France) M Janvier	w/o
11	(Belgium) K Coppejans	6	6
(France) E Benchetrit	3	3
(France) J Tatlot	1	7^{7}	3
5	(Portugal) P Sousa	6	6^{4}	6

Third round
4	(Sweden) E Ymer	2	6	6
13	(France) M Janvier	6	2	1
11	(Belgium) K Coppejans	6	6
5	(Portugal) P Sousa	2	3

Quarterfinals
4	(Sweden) E Ymer	7^{7}	7
11	(Belgium) K Coppejans	6^{5}	5

=== Bottom half ===
==== Section 3 ====
First round
ITF	(France) C Denolly	4	4
(Argentina) F Argüello	6	6
ITF	(Netherlands) T van Rijthoven	5	7	6^{1}
(Egypt) M Safwat	7	5	7^{7}
(Russia) A Vatutin	6	6
ITF	(Spain) O Roca Batalla	2	4
Q	(France) B Bonzi	7^{7}	6
Alt	(Italy) A Bega	6^{4}	1

Second round
LL	(France) H Grenier	4	3
(Argentina) F Argüello	6	6
(Egypt) M Safwat	6	6
9	(Spain) E López Pérez	4	4
14	(France) C Lestienne	6^{5}	6	1
(Russia) A Vatutin	7^{7}	1	6
Q	(France) B Bonzi	6^{5}	3
3	(France) C Moutet	7^{7}	6

Third round
(Argentina) F Argüello	4	4
(Egypt) M Safwat	6	6
(Russia) A Vatutin	7	1	4
3	(France) C Moutet	5	6	6

Quarterfinals
(Egypt) M Safwat	0	2
3	(France) C Moutet	6	6

==== Section 4 ====
First round
ITF	(Germany) Peter Heller	6^{3}	6	3
WC	(France) M Guinard	7^{7}	1	6
(Czech Republic) A Pavlásek	3	4
WC	(France) Antoine Cornut-Chauvinc	6	6
Q	(Croatia) B Gojo	3	5
(Italy) F Gaio	6	7
(Argentina) P Cachin	6	6
WC	(France) M Martineau	1	3

Second round
6	(Spain) P Martínez	6	4	0
WC	(France) M Guinard	4	6	6
WC	(France) A Cornut-Chauvinc	1	3
10/SE	(Germany) R Molleker	6	6
15	(Colombia) DE Galán	4	4
(Italy) F Gaio	6	6
(Argentina) P Cachin	6^{1}	6	5
2	(Spain) P Andújar	7^{7}	2	7

Third round
WC	(France) M Guinard	6	3	7
10/SE	(Germany) R Molleker	4	6	5
(Italy) F Gaio	6	6
2	(Spain) P Andújar	4	2

Quarterfinals
WC	(France) M Guinard	1	6	1
(Italy) F Gaio	6	2	6
