= 2017 Open Sopra Steria de Lyon – Singles =

Singles
- 2017 Open Sopra Steria de Lyon

Final
- Champion: (Canada) Félix Auger-Aliassime
- Runner-up: (France) Mathias Bourgue
- Score: 6–4, 6–1

Events
Singles	Doubles
← 2016 ·	Open Sopra Steria de Lyon	· 2018 →

Steve Darcis was the defending champion but chose not to defend his title.

Félix Auger-Aliassime won the title after defeating Mathias Bourgue 6–4, 6–1 in the final.

== Seeds ==
1. (Argentina) Horacio Zeballos (quarterfinals)
2. (Spain) Marcel Granollers (first round)
3. (Switzerland) Henri Laaksonen (first round)
4. (Norway) Casper Ruud (quarterfinals)
5. (France) Paul-Henri Mathieu (quarterfinals)
6. (Belgium) Arthur De Greef (second round)
7. (South Korea) Lee Duck-hee (first round)
8. (Brazil) João Souza (first round)

== Draw ==
=== Key ===
- Q = Qualifier
- WC = Wild card
- LL = Lucky loser
- Alt = Alternate
- SE = Special exempt
- PR = Protected ranking
- ITF = ITF entry
- JE = Junior exempt
- w/o = Walkover
- r = Retired
- d = Defaulted
- SR = Special ranking

=== Finals ===
Semifinals
Q	(France) Tristan Lamasine	2	1
(France) Mathias Bourgue	6	6
WC	(Canada) Félix Auger-Aliassime	6	6
(Kazakhstan) Aleksandr Nedovyesov	0	3

Final
(France) Mathias Bourgue	4	1
WC	(Canada) Félix Auger-Aliassime	6	6

=== Top half ===
First round
1	(Argentina) H Zeballos	6	2	6
WC	(France) A Müller	2	6	0
WC	(France) C Moutet	5	3
(Sweden) E Ymer	7	6
Q	(France) T Lamasine	6	6
(Turkey) C İlkel	1	4
(Chile) C Garin	7^{7}	6
8	(Brazil) J Souza	6^{5}	1
3	(Switzerland) H Laaksonen	1	4
WC	(France) M Janvier	6	6
(Dominican Republic) J Hernández-Fernández	2	2
(France) M Bourgue	6	6
Q	(France) M Chazal	6	6
(Belgium) K Coppejans	3	2
(Spain) J Munar	3	6	0^{r}
6	(Belgium) A De Greef	6	4	5

Second round
1	(Argentina) H Zeballos	6	7^{10}
(Sweden) E Ymer	3	6^{8}
Q	(France) T Lamasine	6	6
(Chile) C Garin	1	4
WC	(France) M Janvier	4	6^{3}
(France) M Bourgue	6	7^{7}
Q	(France) M Chazal	4	6	6
6	(Belgium) A De Greef	6	2	1

Quarterfinals
1	(Argentina) H Zeballos	7	5	4
Q	(France) T Lamasine	5	7	6
(France) M Bourgue	7	7^{8}
Q	(France) M Chazal	5	6^{6}

Semifinals
Q	(France) T Lamasine	2	1
(France) M Bourgue	6	6

=== Bottom half ===
First round
7	(South Korea) D-h Lee	4	5
(Lithuania) L Grigelis	6	7
(Chile) N Jarry	4	6	2
WC	(Canada) F Auger-Aliassime	6	4	6
(Czech Republic) J Šátral	6	7^{7}
Q	(Estonia) J Zopp	3	6^{4}
(Italy) L Giustino	4	0
4	(Norway) C Ruud	6	6
5	(France) P-H Mathieu	6	6
(Germany) Jeremy Jahn	3	1
(Argentina) M Trungelliti	7	6
(Slovenia) B Rola	5	1
Q	(France) H Nys	2	4
(Belgium) Y Reuter	6	6
(Kazakhstan) A Nedovyesov	6	6
2	(Spain) M Granollers	4	4

Second round
(Lithuania) L Grigelis	7^{8}	1	4
WC	(Canada) F Auger-Aliassime	6^{6}	6	6
(Czech Republic) J Šátral	3	2
4	(Norway) C Ruud	6	6
5	(France) P-H Mathieu	6	5	6
(Argentina) M Trungelliti	3	7	3
(Belgium) Y Reuter	5	2
(Kazakhstan) A Nedovyesov	7	6

Quarterfinals
WC	(Canada) F Auger-Aliassime	6	6^{4}	6
4	(Norway) C Ruud	4	7^{7}	4
5	(France) P-H Mathieu	2	2
(Kazakhstan) A Nedovyesov	6	6

Semifinals
WC	(Canada) F Auger-Aliassime	6	6
(Kazakhstan) A Nedovyesov	0	3
