= 2017 Open Sopra Steria de Lyon – Doubles =

Doubles
- 2017 Open Sopra Steria de Lyon

Final
- Champions: (Belgium) Sander Gillé (Belgium) Joran Vliegen
- Runners-up: (Germany) Gero Kretschmer (Germany) Alexander Satschko
- Score: 6–7^{(2–7)}, 7–6^{(7–2)}, [14–12]

Events
Singles	Doubles
← 2016 ·	Open Sopra Steria de Lyon	· 2018 →

Grégoire Barrère and Tristan Lamasine were the defending champions but only Lamasine chose to defend his title, partnering Hugo Nys. Lamasine lost in the quarterfinals to Gero Kretschmer and Alexander Satschko.

Sander Gillé and Joran Vliegen won the title after defeating Kretschmer and Satschko 6–7^{(2–7)}, 7–6^{(7–2)}, [14–12] in the final.

== Seeds ==
1. (France) Tristan Lamasine / (France) Hugo Nys (quarterfinals)
2. (Chinese Taipei) Hsieh Cheng-peng / (Australia) Rameez Junaid (quarterfinals)
3. (Netherlands) Sander Arends / (Chinese Taipei) Peng Hsien-yin (semifinals)
4. (Belgium) Sander Gillé / (Belgium) Joran Vliegen (champions)

== Draw ==
=== Key ===
- Q = Qualifier
- WC = Wild card
- LL = Lucky loser
- Alt = Alternate
- SE = Special exempt
- PR = Protected ranking
- ITF = ITF entry
- JE = Junior exempt
- w/o = Walkover
- r = Retired
- d = Defaulted
- SR = Special ranking

First round
1	(France) T Lamasine (France) H Nys	6	6
WC	(France) G Jacq (France) A Müller	4	3
(Germany) G Kretschmer (Germany) A Satschko	6	6
(Brazil) F de Paula (Brazil) J Souza	2	3
3	(Netherlands) S Arends (Chinese Taipei) H-y Peng	6^{5}	6	[12]
(Turkey) T Altuna (Italy) L Giustino	7^{7}	1	[10]
(Norway) C Ruud (Netherlands) M Vervoort	7^{7}	6^{6}	[10]
Alt	(United States) Alexander Centenari (Germany) Jeremy Jahn	6^{2}	7^{8}	[5]
(Italy) R Ghedin (Lithuania) L Grigelis	3	4
(Slovenia) B Rola (Czech Republic) J Šátral	6	6
(Belgium) K Coppejans (Brazil) F Neis	5	6	[8]
4	(Belgium) S Gillé (Belgium) J Vliegen	7	3	[10]
Alt	(Chile) C Garin (Spain) J Munar	7	6
(Kazakhstan) A Golubev (Kazakhstan) A Nedovyesov	5	3
WC	(France) C Hemery (Sweden) E Ymer	4	3
2	(Chinese Taipei) C-p Hsieh (Australia) R Junaid	6	6

Quarterfinals
1	(France) T Lamasine (France) H Nys	1	4
(Germany) G Kretschmer (Germany) A Satschko	6	6
3	(Netherlands) S Arends (Chinese Taipei) H-y Peng	7^{7}	6
(Norway) C Ruud (Netherlands) M Vervoort	6^{3}	3
(Slovenia) B Rola (Czech Republic) J Šátral
4	(Belgium) S Gillé (Belgium) J Vliegen	w/o
Alt	(Chile) C Garin (Spain) J Munar	7	6
2	(Chinese Taipei) C-p Hsieh (Australia) R Junaid	5	3

Semifinals
(Germany) G Kretschmer (Germany) A Satschko	6	6
3	(Netherlands) S Arends (Chinese Taipei) H-y Peng	3	2
4	(Belgium) S Gillé (Belgium) J Vliegen	6	3	[10]
Alt	(Chile) C Garin (Spain) J Munar	4	6	[4]

Final
(Germany) G Kretschmer (Germany) A Satschko	7^{7}	6^{2}	[12]
4	(Belgium) S Gillé (Belgium) J Vliegen	6^{2}	7^{7}	[14]
