= 2023 Open Sopra Steria de Lyon – Singles =

Singles
- 2023 Open Sopra Steria de Lyon

Final
- Champion: (Brazil) Felipe Meligeni Alves
- Runner-up: (Switzerland) Alexander Ritschard
- Score: 6–4, 0–6, 7–6^{(9–7)}

Events
Singles	Doubles
← 2022 ·	Open Sopra Steria de Lyon	· 2024 →

Corentin Moutet was the defending champion but chose not to defend his title.

Felipe Meligeni Alves won the title after defeating Alexander Ritschard 6–4, 0–6, 7–6^{(9–7)} in the final.

== Seeds ==
1. (France) Quentin Halys (first round)
2. (Spain) Pedro Martínez (first round)
3. (Argentina) Facundo Díaz Acosta (first round, retired)
4. (Kazakhstan) Timofey Skatov (first round)
5. (France) Benoît Paire (quarterfinals)
6. (Japan) Kaichi Uchida (first round, retired)
7. (France) Geoffrey Blancaneaux (withdrew)
8. (Brazil) Felipe Meligeni Alves (champion)

== Draw ==
=== Key ===
- Q = Qualifier
- WC = Wild card
- LL = Lucky loser
- Alt = Alternate
- SE = Special exempt
- PR = Protected ranking
- ITF = ITF entry
- JE = Junior exempt
- w/o = Walkover
- r = Retired
- d = Defaulted
- SR = Special ranking

=== Finals ===
Semifinals
(Spain) Alejandro Moro Cañas	7^{8}	6^{2}	4
8	(Brazil) Felipe Meligeni Alves	6^{6}	7^{7}	6
(Switzerland) Alexander Ritschard	6^{5}	6	6
WC	(France) Gabriel Debru	7^{7}	3	2

Final
8	(Brazil) Felipe Meligeni Alves	6	0	7^{9}
(Switzerland) Alexander Ritschard	4	6	6^{7}

=== Top half ===
First round
1	(France) Q Halys	2	2
(Spain) P Llamas Ruiz	6	6
(Sweden) DN Mădăraș	5	2
(Belgium) M Geerts	7	6
WC	(France) U Blanchet	4	4
LL	(France) C Tabur	6	6
(Spain) A Moro Cañas	6	1
6	(Japan) K Uchida	1	0^{r}
3	(Argentina) F Díaz Acosta	6^{5}	0^{r}
Q	(France) M Janvier	7^{7}	0
(France) D Added	4	0
Q	(France) M Bourgue	6	6
(Italy) G Mager	7	6
(Argentina) M Navone	5	1
(Brazil) M Pucinelli de Almeida	6	3	4
8	(Brazil) F Meligeni Alves	3	6	6

Second round
(Spain) P Llamas Ruiz	7^{7}	7
(Belgium) M Geerts	6^{2}	5
LL	(France) C Tabur	2	3
(Spain) A Moro Cañas	6	6
Q	(France) M Janvier	3	4
Q	(France) M Bourgue	6	6
(Italy) G Mager	4	6	2
8	(Brazil) F Meligeni Alves	6	3	6

Quarterfinals
(Spain) P Llamas Ruiz	7^{7}	4	1
(Spain) A Moro Cañas	6^{3}	6	6
Q	(France) M Bourgue	6^{4}	7^{7}	3
8	(Brazil) F Meligeni Alves	7^{7}	6^{5}	6

Semifinals
(Spain) A Moro Cañas	7^{8}	6^{2}	4
8	(Brazil) F Meligeni Alves	6^{6}	7^{7}	6

=== Bottom half ===
First round
Q	(France) T Paris	6	2	3
Q	(France) Jules Marie	3	6	6
(France) H Mayot	7^{7}	2	2
(Switzerland) A Ritschard	6^{1}	6	6
(Italy) S Caruso	6	6
(Chinese Taipei) C-h Tseng	2	0
(France) T Atmane	6	6
4	(Kazakhstan) T Skatov	2	1
5	(France) B Paire	4	7^{7}	6
Q	(Austria) D Novak	6	6^{2}	2
WC	(France) L Pouille	6^{3}	6	6
(Dominican Republic) N Hardt	7^{7}	4	4
I Gakhov	6	7
Q	(France) M Guinard	4	5
WC	(France) G Debru	6	5	6
2	(Spain) P Martínez	1	7	4

Second round
Q	(France) J Marie	3	2
(Switzerland) A Ritschard	6	6
(Italy) S Caruso	3	6	7
(France) T Atmane	6	2	5
5	(France) B Paire	3	7^{8}	6
WC	(France) L Pouille	6	6^{6}	2
I Gakhov	5	3
WC	(France) G Debru	7	6

Quarterfinals
(Switzerland) A Ritschard	4	6	6
(Italy) S Caruso	6	3	4
5	(France) B Paire	2	7^{11}	2
WC	(France) G Debru	6	6^{9}	6

Semifinals
(Switzerland) A Ritschard	6^{5}	6	6
WC	(France) G Debru	7^{7}	3	2
