= 2022 Open Sopra Steria de Lyon – Singles =

Singles
- 2022 Open Sopra Steria de Lyon

Final
- Champion: (France) Corentin Moutet
- Runner-up: (Argentina) Pedro Cachin
- Score: 6–4, 6–4

Events
| Singles | Doubles |
| ← 2021 · | Open Sopra Steria de Lyon | · 2023 → |

Pablo Cuevas was the defending champion but chose not to defend his title.

Corentin Moutet won the title after defeating Pedro Cachin 6–4, 6–4 in the final.

== Seeds ==
1. (Argentina) Federico Coria (quarterfinals)
2. (France) Richard Gasquet (semifinals)
3. (Bolivia) Hugo Dellien (first round)
4. (Spain) Pablo Andújar (first round)
5. (Portugal) Nuno Borges (second round)
6. (Chile) Tomás Barrios Vera (withdrew)
7. (France) Corentin Moutet (champion)
8. (France) Manuel Guinard (semifinals)

== Draw ==
=== Key ===
- Q = Qualifier
- WC = Wild card
- LL = Lucky loser
- Alt = Alternate
- SE = Special exempt
- PR = Protected ranking
- ITF = ITF entry
- JE = Junior exempt
- w/o = Walkover
- r = Retired
- d = Defaulted
- SR = Special ranking

=== Finals ===
Semifinals
8 | (France) Manuel Guinard | 3 | 2
7 | (France) Corentin Moutet | 6 | 6
(Argentina) Pedro Cachin | 6 | 7
2 | (France) Richard Gasquet | 1 | 5

Final
7 | (France) Corentin Moutet | 6 | 6
(Argentina) Pedro Cachin | 4 | 4

=== Top half ===
First round
1 | (Argentina) F Coria | 6 | 6
Q | (Belgium) K Coppejans | 3 | 3
Q | (France) A Fils | 7^{7} | 4 | 6
(Argentina) C Ugo Carabelli | 6^{5} | 6 | 4
(Italy) A Pellegrino | 6 | 6
(Argentina) GA Olivieri | 4 | 4
WC | (France) U Blanchet | 5 | 3
8 | (France) M Guinard | 7 | 6
3 | (Bolivia) H Dellien | 3 | 1
(France) H Grenier | 6 | 6
Q | I Gakhov | 6 | 6
WC | (France) L Van Assche | 2 | 4
(France) E Furness | 6 | 6
Q | (China) J Shang | 2 | 3
(Switzerland) A Ritschard | 2 | 6^{3}
7 | (France) C Moutet | 6 | 7^{7}

Second round
1 | (Argentina) F Coria | 7^{8} | 7^{8}
Q | (France) A Fils | 6^{6} | 6^{6}
(Italy) A Pellegrino | 4 | 5
8 | (France) M Guinard | 6 | 7
(France) H Grenier | 6 | 6
Q | I Gakhov | 2 | 1
(France) E Furness | 4 | 4
7 | (France) C Moutet | 6 | 6

Quarterfinals
1 | (Argentina) F Coria | 4 | 2
8 | (France) M Guinard | 6 | 6
(France) H Grenier | 3 | 6 | 6^{3}
7 | (France) C Moutet | 6 | 4 | 7^{7}

Semifinals
8 | (France) M Guinard | 3 | 2
7 | (France) C Moutet | 6 | 6

=== Bottom half ===
First round
5 | (Portugal) N Borges | 6 | 6
(Chile) G Lama | 4 | 4
(Argentina) F Díaz Acosta | 6^{5} | 3
(France) A Müller | 7^{7} | 6
(Argentina) P Cachin | 7^{7} | 6
WC | (France) K Jacquet | 6^{5} | 4
LL | (Argentina) JB Torres | 6 | 6
4 | (Spain) P Andújar | 3 | 3
Q | (Brazil) G Décamps | 6 | 6
(Brazil) T Seyboth Wild | 2 | 3
Q | A Vatutin | 6 | 6
LL | (France) M Janvier | 4 | 2
(Argentina) A Collarini | 6 | 6
(Netherlands) J Sels | 4 | 4
(France) G Barrère | 4 | 6 | 1
2 | (France) R Gasquet | 6 | 4 | 6

Second round
5 | (Portugal) N Borges | 4 | 2
(France) A Müller | 6 | 6
(Argentina) P Cachin | 4 | 6 | 7^{7}
LL | (Argentina) JB Torres | 6 | 2 | 6^{1}
Q | (Brazil) G Décamps | 5 | 1
Q | A Vatutin | 7 | 6
(Argentina) A Collarini | 7^{7} | 4 | 2
2 | (France) R Gasquet | 6^{2} | 6 | 6

Quarterfinals
(France) A Müller | 6^{4} | 6^{5}
(Argentina) P Cachin | 7^{7} | 7^{7}
Q | A Vatutin | 1 | 6 | 1
2 | (France) R Gasquet | 6 | 3 | 6

Semifinals
(Argentina) P Cachin | 6 | 7
2 | (France) R Gasquet | 1 | 5
