= 2018 Open Sopra Steria de Lyon =

- Date: 11–17 June
- Edition: 3rd
- Draw: 32S / 16D
- Surface: Clay
- Location: Lyon, France

Champions

Singles
- (Canada) Félix Auger-Aliassime

Doubles
- (France) Elliot Benchetrit / (France) Geoffrey Blancaneaux
← 2017 ·	Open Sopra Steria de Lyon	· 2019 →

The 2018 Open Sopra Steria de Lyon was a professional tennis tournament played on clay courts. It was the 3rd edition of the tournament which was part of the 2018 ATP Challenger Tour. It took place in Lyon, France, between 11 and 17 June 2018.

== Singles main-draw entrants ==
=== Seeds ===
Country	Player	Rank^{1}	Seed
ESP	Roberto Carballés Baena	76	1
AUT	Gerald Melzer	111	2
POR	Pedro Sousa	120	3
ESP	Pablo Andújar	128	4
FRA	Quentin Halys	135	5
SUI	Henri Laaksonen	137	6
RUS	Alexey Vatutin	140	7
FRA	Corentin Moutet	141	8

- ^{1} Rankings are as of 28 May 2018.

=== Other entrants ===
The following players received wildcards into the singles main draw:

- (France) Elliot Benchetrit
- (France) Corentin Moutet
- (France) Alexandre Müller
- (Australia) Alexei Popyrin

The following players received entry from the qualifying draw:

- (France) Tristan Lamasine
- (Italy) Roberto Marcora
- (France) Johan Tatlot
- (Sweden) Mikael Ymer

== Champions ==
=== Singles ===
- (Canada) Félix Auger-Aliassime def. (France) Johan Tatlot 6–7^{(3–7)}, 7–5, 6–2.

=== Doubles ===
- (France) Elliot Benchetrit / (France) Geoffrey Blancaneaux def. (Chinese Taipei) Hsieh Cheng-peng / (Switzerland) Luca Margaroli 6–3, 4–6, [10–7].
