= 2023 Open Sopra Steria de Lyon =

- Date: 12–18 June
- Edition: 7th
- Surface: Clay
- Location: Lyon, France

Champions

Singles
- (Brazil) Felipe Meligeni Alves

Doubles
- (France) Manuel Guinard / (France) Grégoire Jacq
← 2022 ·	Open Sopra Steria de Lyon	· 2024 →

The 2023 Open Sopra Steria de Lyon was a professional tennis tournament played on clay courts. It was the 7th edition of the tournament which was part of the 2023 ATP Challenger Tour. It took place in Lyon, France, between 12 and 18 June 2023.

== Singles main-draw entrants ==
=== Seeds ===
Country	Player	Rank^{1}	Seed
FRA	Quentin Halys	88	1
ESP	Pedro Martínez	135	2
ARG	Facundo Díaz Acosta	137	3
KAZ	Timofey Skatov	147	4
FRA	Benoît Paire	149	5
JPN	Kaichi Uchida	154	6
~~FRA~~	~~Geoffrey Blancaneaux~~	~~161~~	~~7~~
BRA	Felipe Meligeni Alves	165	8

- ^{1} Rankings are as of 29 May 2023.

=== Other entrants ===
The following players received wildcards into the singles main draw:

- (France) Ugo Blanchet
- (France) Gabriel Debru
- (France) Lucas Pouille

The following players received entry from the qualifying draw:

- (France) Mathias Bourgue
- (France) Manuel Guinard
- (France) Maxime Janvier
- (France) Jules Marie
- (Austria) Dennis Novak
- (France) Tom Paris

The following player received entry as a lucky loser:

- (France) Clément Tabur

== Champions ==
=== Singles ===
- (Brazil) Felipe Meligeni Alves def. (Switzerland) Alexander Ritschard 6–4, 0–6, 7–6^{(9–7)}.

=== Doubles ===
- (France) Manuel Guinard / (France) Grégoire Jacq def. (Germany) Constantin Frantzen / (Germany) Hendrik Jebens 6–4, 2–6, [10–7].
