= 2016 Open Sopra Steria de Lyon – Doubles =

Doubles
- 2016 Open Sopra Steria de Lyon

Final
- Champions: (France) Grégoire Barrère (France) Tristan Lamasine
- Runners-up: (France) Jonathan Eysseric (Croatia) Franko Škugor
- Score: 2–6, 6–3, [10–6]

Events
Singles	Doubles
Open Sopra Steria de Lyon	· 2017 →

This was the first edition of the tournament.

Grégoire Barrère and Tristan Lamasine won the title after defeating Jonathan Eysseric and Franko Škugor 2–6, 6–3, [10–6] in the final.

== Seeds ==
1. (South Africa) Dean O'Brien / (South Africa) Ruan Roelofse (first round)
2. (France) Jonathan Eysseric / (Croatia) Franko Škugor (final)
3. (Chinese Taipei) Peng Hsien-yin / (China) Zhang Ze (semifinals)
4. (Croatia) Ivan Sabanov / (Croatia) Matej Sabanov (first round)

== Draw ==
=== Key ===
- Q = Qualifier
- WC = Wild card
- LL = Lucky loser
- Alt = Alternate
- SE = Special exempt
- PR = Protected ranking
- ITF = ITF entry
- JE = Junior exempt
- w/o = Walkover
- r = Retired
- d = Defaulted
- SR = Special ranking

First round
1	(South Africa) D O'Brien (South Africa) R Roelofse	2	6	[9]
(France) M Chazal (France) M Teixeira	6	4	[11]
(France) G Barrère (France) T Lamasine	6	6
(France) D Guez (Belgium) Y Mertens	4	4
3	(Chinese Taipei) H-y Peng (China) Z Zhang	7	6
PR	(Serbia) N Čačić (Japan) T Daniel	5	4
(France) M Bourgue (France) C Hemery	4	2
Alt	(Netherlands) D Pel (Netherlands) A van der Duim	6	6
(United States) T Paul (Brazil) J Souza	6	6
WC	(France) Bastien Favier (France) H Grenier	0	3
(Belgium) K Coppejans (Belgium) J De Loore	6	7^{7}
4	(Croatia) I Sabanov (Croatia) M Sabanov	4	6^{4}
(Brazil) T Monteiro (Argentina) R Olivo	6	6
WC	(France) C Denolly (France) Alexandre Ruscica	2	4
WC	(France) C Lestienne (France) H Nys	4	6	[3]
2	(France) J Eysseric (Croatia) F Škugor	6	3	[10]

Quarterfinals
(France) M Chazal (France) M Teixeira	4	4
(France) G Barrère (France) T Lamasine	6	6
3	(Chinese Taipei) H-y Peng (China) Z Zhang	7^{7}	6
Alt	(Netherlands) D Pel (Netherlands) A van der Duim	6^{4}	4
(United States) T Paul (Brazil) J Souza	6^{4}	2
(Belgium) K Coppejans (Belgium) J De Loore	7^{7}	6
(Brazil) T Monteiro (Argentina) R Olivo	6^{5}	3
2	(France) J Eysseric (Croatia) F Škugor	7^{7}	6

Semifinals
(France) G Barrère (France) T Lamasine	6	6
3	(Chinese Taipei) H-y Peng (China) Z Zhang	1	4
(Belgium) K Coppejans (Belgium) J De Loore	6^{2}	6	[5]
2	(France) J Eysseric (Croatia) F Škugor	7^{7}	3	[10]

Final
(France) G Barrère (France) T Lamasine	2	6	[10]
2	(France) J Eysseric (Croatia) F Škugor	6	3	[6]
