= 2016 Open Sopra Steria de Lyon – Singles =

Singles
- 2016 Open Sopra Steria de Lyon

Final
- Champion: (Belgium) Steve Darcis
- Runner-up: (Brazil) Thiago Monteiro
- Score: 3–6, 6–2, 6–0

Events
Singles	Doubles
Open Sopra Steria de Lyon	· 2017 →

This was the first edition of the tournament.

Steve Darcis won the title after defeating Thiago Monteiro 3–6, 6–2, 6–0 in the final.

== Seeds ==
1. (Japan) Taro Daniel (first round)
2. (Spain) Roberto Carballés Baena (first round)
3. (Italy) Thomas Fabbiano (first round)
4. (Argentina) Carlos Berlocq (quarterfinals)
5. (Brazil) Thiago Monteiro (final)
6. (Argentina) Renzo Olivo (first round)
7. (Italy) Luca Vanni (withdrew)
8. (Belgium) Steve Darcis (champion)

== Draw ==
=== Key ===
- Q = Qualifier
- WC = Wild card
- LL = Lucky loser
- Alt = Alternate
- SE = Special exempt
- PR = Protected ranking
- ITF = ITF entry
- JE = Junior exempt
- w/o = Walkover
- r = Retired
- d = Defaulted
- SR = Special ranking

=== Finals ===
Semifinals
8	(Belgium) Steve Darcis	6	5	6
(Brazil) João Souza	3	7	4
(France) Grégoire Barrère	4	2
5	(Brazil) Thiago Monteiro	6	6

Final
8	(Belgium) Steve Darcis	3	6	6
5	(Brazil) Thiago Monteiro	6	2	0

=== Top half ===
First round
1	(Japan) T Daniel	6^{8}	0
Q	(Republic of Ireland) J McGee	7^{10}	6
(Belgium) K Coppejans	6	1	7
(France) C Hemery	4	6	5
(Spain) J Samper-Montaña	4	6	6
(China) Z Zhang	6	4	3
Q	(Belgium) J De Loore	6	6^{7}	4
8	(Belgium) S Darcis	3	7^{9}	6
4	(Argentina) C Berlocq	6	6
(France) C Lestienne	3	4
(France) M Bourgue	4	6	6
(France) D Guez	6	0	4
(France) T Lamasine	6	6
(Belgium) Y Mertens	4	0
(Brazil) J Souza	6	5	6
6	(Argentina) R Olivo	2	7	2

Second round
Q	(Republic of Ireland) J McGee	0	3
(Belgium) K Coppejans	6	6
(Spain) J Samper-Montaña	2	2
8	(Belgium) S Darcis	6	6
4	(Argentina) C Berlocq	6	6
(France) M Bourgue	0	3
(France) T Lamasine	6	3	4
(Brazil) J Souza	3	6	6

Quarterfinals
(Belgium) K Coppejans	4	7^{7}	3
8	(Belgium) S Darcis	6	6^{4}	6
4	(Argentina) C Berlocq	4	4
(Brazil) J Souza	6	6

Semifinals
8	(Belgium) S Darcis	6	5	6
(Brazil) J Souza	3	7	4

=== Bottom half ===
First round
LL	(Belgium) Clement Geens	6^{10}	6	7
(Netherlands) A van der Duim	7^{12}	1	5
WC	(France) L Lokoli	0	6^{4}
(United States) T Paul	6	7^{7}
(France) G Barrère	6	6
LL	(France) M Teixeira	0	2
WC	(France) M Chazal	6	1	6
3	(Italy) T Fabbiano	4	6	4
5	(Brazil) T Monteiro	6	6
WC	(France) J Benneteau	3	4
Q	(Switzerland) Y Marti	6	6
WC	(France) C Denolly	4	0
(Croatia) F Škugor	4	4
Q	(France) J Eysseric	6	6
(Switzerland) H Laaksonen	7	6
2	(Spain) R Carballés Baena	5	0

Second round
LL	(Belgium) C Geens	1	3
(United States) T Paul	6	6
(France) G Barrère	6	6
WC	(France) M Chazal	3	4
5	(Brazil) T Monteiro	4	6	6
Q	(Switzerland) Y Marti	6	4	3
Q	(France) J Eysseric	3	3
(Switzerland) H Laaksonen	6	6

Quarterfinals
(United States) T Paul	2	3
(France) G Barrère	6	6
5	(Brazil) T Monteiro	6	7^{9}
(Switzerland) H Laaksonen	1	6^{7}

Semifinals
(France) G Barrère	4	2
5	(Brazil) T Monteiro	6	6
