= 2022 Open Sopra Steria de Lyon – Doubles =

Doubles
- 2022 Open Sopra Steria de Lyon

Final
- Champions: (Monaco) Romain Arneodo (France) Jonathan Eysseric
- Runners-up: (Netherlands) Sander Arends (Netherlands) David Pel
- Score: 7–5, 4–6, [10–4]

Events
Singles	Doubles
- Open Sopra Steria de Lyon

Martín and Pablo Cuevas were the defending champions but only Martín Cuevas chose to defend his title, partnering Luis David Martínez. Cuevas lost in the semifinals to Sander Arends and David Pel.

Romain Arneodo and Jonathan Eysseric won the title after defeating Arends and Pel 7–5, 4–6, [10–4] in the final.

== Seeds ==
1. (Netherlands) Sander Arends / (Netherlands) David Pel (final)
2. (Monaco) Romain Arneodo / (France) Jonathan Eysseric (champions)
3. (Poland) Karol Drzewiecki / (United States) Alex Lawson (quarterfinals)
4. (Uruguay) Martín Cuevas / (Venezuela) Luis David Martínez (semifinals)

== Draw ==
Key

- Q = Qualifier
- WC = Wild card
- LL = Lucky loser
- Alt = Alternate
- ITF = ITF entry
- PR = Protected ranking
- SR = Special ranking
- SE = Special exempt
- JE = Junior exempt
- JR = Junior Accelerator Programme entrant
- CO = College Accelerator Programme entrant
- NG = Next Gen Accelerator Program entrant
- w/o = Walkover
- r = Retired
- d = Defaulted

First round
1	(Netherlands) S Arends (Netherlands) D Pel	6	6
(France) H Grenier (France) A Müller	3	4
WC	(France) U Blanchet (France) Joshua Dous Karpenschif	6	3	[8]
(Netherlands) M Hermans (Netherlands) J Sels	2	6	[10]
4	(Uruguay) M Cuevas (Venezuela) LD Martínez	6	6
(Canada) A Galarneau (United States) A Rybakov	4	2
(France) E Furness (France) K Jacquet	6^{5}	3
WC	(France) A Fils (France) G Mpetshi Perricard	7^{7}	6
(Argentina) F Díaz Acosta (Peru) A Merino	7^{7}	6
(Kazakhstan) G Lomakin; A Vatutin	6^{2}	2
PR	(Italy) M Donati (Chile) G Lama	2	7^{8}	[7]
3	(Poland) K Drzewiecki (United States) A Lawson	6	6^{6}	[10]
Alt	(Switzerland) L Castelnuovo (India) A Chandrasekar	6^{5}	6	[10]
(Argentina) A Collarini (Argentina) F Coria	7^{7}	3	[8]
Alt	I Gakhov (Japan) S Mochizuki	3	7	[5]
2	(Monaco) R Arneodo (France) J Eysseric	6	5	[10]

Quarterfinals
1	(Netherlands) S Arends (Netherlands) D Pel	6	6
(Netherlands) M Hermans (Netherlands) J Sels	4	2
4	(Uruguay) M Cuevas (Venezuela) LD Martínez	6	3	[10]
WC	(France) A Fils (France) G Mpetshi Perricard	4	6	[3]
(Argentina) F Díaz Acosta (Peru) A Merino	2	6	[10]
3	(Poland) K Drzewiecki (United States) A Lawson	6	3	[4]
Alt	(Switzerland) L Castelnuovo (India) A Chandrasekar	3	4
2	(Monaco) R Arneodo (France) J Eysseric	6	6

Semifinals
1	(Netherlands) S Arends (Netherlands) D Pel	6	3	[10]
4	(Uruguay) M Cuevas (Venezuela) LD Martínez	3	6	[2]
(Argentina) F Díaz Acosta (Peru) A Merino	5	2
2	(Monaco) R Arneodo (France) J Eysseric	7	6

Final
1	(Netherlands) S Arends (Netherlands) D Pel	5	6	[4]
2	(Monaco) R Arneodo (France) J Eysseric	7	4	[10]
