= 2022 Open Sopra Steria de Lyon =

- Date: 6–12 June
- Edition: 6th
- Surface: Clay
- Location: Lyon, France

Champions

Singles
- (France) Corentin Moutet

Doubles
- (Monaco) Romain Arneodo / (France) Jonathan Eysseric
← 2021 ·	Open Sopra Steria de Lyon	· 2023 →

The 2022 Open Sopra Steria de Lyon was a professional tennis tournament played on clay courts. It was the 6th edition of the tournament which was part of the 2022 ATP Challenger Tour. It took place in Lyon, France, between 6 and 12 June 2022.

== Singles main-draw entrants ==
=== Seeds ===
Country	Player	Rank^{1}	Seed
ARG	Federico Coria	54	1
FRA	Richard Gasquet	70	2
BOL	Hugo Dellien	90	3
ESP	Pablo Andújar	98	4
POR	Nuno Borges	134	5
~~CHI~~	~~Tomás Barrios Vera~~	~~137~~	~~6~~
FRA	Corentin Moutet	138	7
FRA	Manuel Guinard	145	8

- ^{1} Rankings are as of 23 May 2022.

=== Other entrants ===
The following players received wildcards into the singles main draw:

- (France) Ugo Blanchet
- (France) Kyrian Jacquet
- (France) Luca Van Assche

The following player received entry into the singles main draw as a special exempt:

- (Chile) ~~Tomás Barrios Vera~~

The following players received entry from the qualifying draw:

- (Belgium) Kimmer Coppejans
- (Brazil) Gabriel Décamps
- (France) Arthur Fils
- Ivan Gakhov
- (China) Shang Juncheng
- Alexey Vatutin

The following players received entry as lucky losers:

- (France) Maxime Janvier
- (Argentina) Juan Bautista Torres

== Champions ==
=== Singles ===
- (France) Corentin Moutet def. (Argentina) Pedro Cachin 6–4, 6–4.

=== Doubles ===
- (Monaco) Romain Arneodo / (France) Jonathan Eysseric def. (Netherlands) Sander Arends / (Netherlands) David Pel 7–5, 4–6, [10–4].
