= 2016 Open Sopra Steria de Lyon =

- Date: 6–12 June
- Edition: 1st
- Draw: 32S / 16D
- Prize money: $64,000+H
- Surface: Clay
- Location: Lyon, France

Champions

Singles
- (Belgium) Steve Darcis

Doubles
- (France) Grégoire Barrère / (France) Tristan Lamasine
Open Sopra Steria de Lyon	· 2017 →

The 2016 Open Sopra Steria de Lyon was a professional tennis tournament played on clay courts. It was the 1st edition of the tournament which was part of the 2016 ATP Challenger Tour. It took place in Lyon, France, between 6 and 12 June 2016.

== Singles main-draw entrants ==
=== Seeds ===
Country	Player	Rank^{1}	Seed
JPN	Taro Daniel	93	1
ESP	Roberto Carballés Baena	114	2
ITA	Thomas Fabbiano	117	3
ARG	Carlos Berlocq	126	4
BRA	Thiago Monteiro	139	5
ARG	Renzo Olivo	145	6
ITA	Luca Vanni	159	7
BEL	Steve Darcis	161	8

- ^{1} Rankings are as of May 30, 2016.

=== Other entrants ===
The following players received wildcards into the singles main draw:

- (France) Julien Benneteau
- (France) Maxime Chazal
- (France) Corentin Denolly
- (France) Laurent Lokoli

The following players received entry from the qualifying draw:

- (France) Jonathan Eysseric
- (Belgium) Joris De Loore
- (Switzerland) Yann Marti
- (Republic of Ireland) James McGee

The following players received entry as lucky losers:

- (Belgium) Clement Geens
- (France) Maxime Teixeira

== Champions ==
=== Singles ===
- (Belgium) Steve Darcis def. (Brazil) Thiago Monteiro 3–6, 6–2, 6–0.

=== Doubles ===
- (France) Grégoire Barrère / (France) Tristan Lamasine def. (France) Jonathan Eysseric / (Croatia) Franko Škugor 2–6, 6–3, [10–6].
