= 2017 Open Sopra Steria de Lyon =

- Date: 12–18 June
- Edition: 2nd
- Draw: 32S / 16D
- Surface: Clay
- Location: Lyon, France

Champions

Singles
- (Canada) Félix Auger-Aliassime

Doubles
- (Belgium) Sander Gillé / (Belgium) Joran Vliegen
| ← 2016 · | Open Sopra Steria de Lyon | · 2018 → |

The 2017 Open Sopra Steria de Lyon was a professional tennis tournament played on clay courts. It was the 2nd edition of the tournament which was part of the 2017 ATP Challenger Tour. It took place in Lyon, France, between 12 and 18 June 2017.

== Singles main-draw entrants ==
=== Seeds ===
| Country | Player | Rank^{1} | Seed |
|---|---|---|---|
| ARG | Horacio Zeballos | 65 | 1 |
| ESP | Marcel Granollers | 77 | 2 |
| SUI | Henri Laaksonen | 105 | 3 |
| NOR | Casper Ruud | 119 | 4 |
| FRA | Paul-Henri Mathieu | 120 | 5 |
| BEL | Arthur De Greef | 127 | 6 |
| KOR | Lee Duck-hee | 131 | 7 |
| BRA | João Souza | 140 | 8 |

- ^{1} Rankings are as of 29 May 2017.

=== Other entrants ===
The following players received wildcards into the singles main draw:

- (Canada) Félix Auger-Aliassime
- (France) Maxime Janvier
- (France) Corentin Moutet
- (France) Alexandre Müller

The following players received entry from the qualifying draw:

- (France) Maxime Chazal
- (France) Tristan Lamasine
- (France) Hugo Nys
- (Estonia) Jürgen Zopp

== Champions ==
=== Singles ===
- (Canada) Félix Auger-Aliassime def. (France) Mathias Bourgue 6–4, 6–1.

=== Doubles ===
- (Belgium) Sander Gillé / (Belgium) Joran Vliegen def. (Germany) Gero Kretschmer / (Germany) Alexander Satschko 6–7^{(2–7)}, 7–6^{(7–2)}, [14–12].
