= 2021 Open Sopra Steria de Lyon =

- Date: 7–13 June
- Edition: 5th
- Draw: 32S / 16D
- Surface: Clay
- Location: Lyon, France

Champions

Singles
- (Uruguay) Pablo Cuevas

Doubles
- (Uruguay) Martín Cuevas / (Uruguay) Pablo Cuevas
← 2019 ·	Open Sopra Steria de Lyon	· 2022 →

The 2021 Open Sopra Steria de Lyon was a professional tennis tournament played on clay courts. It was the 5th edition of the tournament which was part of the 2021 ATP Challenger Tour. It took place in Lyon, France, between 7 and 13 June 2021.

== Singles main-draw entrants ==
=== Seeds ===
Country	Player	Rank^{1}	Seed
URU	Pablo Cuevas	92	1
ESP	Fernando Verdasco	99	2
ARG	Facundo Bagnis	104	3
COL	Daniel Elahi Galán	107	4
JPN	Taro Daniel	113	5
FRA	Benjamin Bonzi	116	6
ARG	Francisco Cerúndolo	117	7
GER	Cedrik-Marcel Stebe	135	8

- ^{1} Rankings are as of 31 May 2021.

=== Other entrants ===
The following players received wildcards into the singles main draw:

- (France) Titouan Droguet
- (France) Kyrian Jacquet
- (France) Matteo Martineau

The following player received entry into the singles main draw as a special exempt:

- (Denmark) Holger Rune

The following players received entry from the qualifying draw:

- (Argentina) Pedro Cachin
- (France) Manuel Guinard
- (Argentina) Camilo Ugo Carabelli
- (Russia) Alexey Vatutin

The following players received entry as lucky losers:

- (Belgium) Michael Geerts
- (France) Laurent Lokoli

== Champions ==
=== Singles ===
- (Uruguay) Pablo Cuevas def. (Sweden) Elias Ymer 6–2, 6–2.

=== Doubles ===
- (Uruguay) Martín Cuevas / (Uruguay) Pablo Cuevas def. (France) Tristan Lamasine / (France) Albano Olivetti 6–3, 7–6^{(7–2)}.
