= 2019 Open Sopra Steria de Lyon =

- Date: 10–16 June
- Edition: 4th
- Draw: 48S / 16D
- Surface: Clay
- Location: Lyon, France

Champions

Singles
- (France) Corentin Moutet

Doubles
- (Austria) Philipp Oswald / (Slovakia) Filip Polášek
← 2018 ·	Open Sopra Steria de Lyon	· 2021 →

The 2019 Open Sopra Steria de Lyon was a professional tennis tournament played on clay courts. It was the 4th edition of the tournament which was part of the 2019 ATP Challenger Tour. It took place in Lyon, France, between 10 and 16 June 2019.

== Singles main-draw entrants ==
=== Seeds ===
Country	Player	Rank^{1}	Seed
ESP	Albert Ramos Viñolas	87	1
ESP	Pablo Andújar	93	2
FRA	Corentin Moutet	110	3
SWE	Elias Ymer	115	4
POR	Pedro Sousa	124	5
ESP	Pedro Martínez	134	6
~~ITA~~	~~Gianluca Mager~~	~~142~~	~~7~~
FRA	Quentin Halys	151	8
ESP	Enrique López Pérez	166	9
GER	Rudolf Molleker	173	10
BEL	Kimmer Coppejans	178	11
BEL	Arthur De Greef	181	12
FRA	Maxime Janvier	190	13
FRA	Constant Lestienne	192	14
COL	Daniel Elahi Galán	197	15
NED	Tallon Griekspoor	198	16

- ^{1} Rankings are as of 27 May 2019.

=== Other entrants ===
The following players received wildcards into the singles main draw:

- (France) ~~Geoffrey Blancaneaux~~
- (France) Antoine Cornut-Chauvinc
- (France) Hugo Gaston
- (France) Manuel Guinard
- (France) Matteo Martineau

The following player received entry into the singles main draw as a special exempt:

- (Germany) Rudolf Molleker

The following players received entry into the singles main draw as alternates:

- (Italy) Alessandro Bega
- (Monaco) Hugo Nys

The following players received entry into the singles main draw using their ITF World Tennis Ranking:

- (France) Corentin Denolly
- (Spain) Eduard Esteve Lobato
- (Germany) Peter Heller
- (Spain) Oriol Roca Batalla
- (Netherlands) Tim van Rijthoven

The following players received entry from the qualifying draw:

- (France) Benjamin Bonzi
- (Croatia) Borna Gojo

The following player received entry as a lucky loser:

- (France) Hugo Grenier

== Champions ==
=== Singles ===
- (France) Corentin Moutet def. (Sweden) Elias Ymer 6–4, 6–4.

=== Doubles ===
- (Austria) Philipp Oswald / (Slovakia) Filip Polášek def. (Italy) Simone Bolelli / (Italy) Andrea Pellegrino 6–4, 7–6^{(7–2)}.
