= 2023 Open Sopra Steria de Lyon – Doubles =

Doubles
- 2023 Open Sopra Steria de Lyon

Final
- Champions: (France) Manuel Guinard (France) Grégoire Jacq
- Runners-up: (Germany) Constantin Frantzen (Germany) Hendrik Jebens
- Score: 6–4, 2–6, [10–7]

Events
Singles	Doubles
- Open Sopra Steria de Lyon

Romain Arneodo and Jonathan Eysseric were the defending champions but only Eysseric chose to defend his title, partnering Miguel Ángel Reyes-Varela. Eysseric lost in the first round to Manuel Guinard and Grégoire Jacq.

Guinard and Jacq won the title after defeating Constantin Frantzen and Hendrik Jebens 6–4, 2–6, [10–7] in the final.

== Seeds ==
1. (France) Jonathan Eysseric / (Mexico) Miguel Ángel Reyes-Varela (first round)
2. (Germany) Constantin Frantzen / (Germany) Hendrik Jebens (final)
3. (Greece) Petros Tsitsipas / (Netherlands) Sem Verbeek (semifinals)
4. (France) Dan Added / (Belgium) Michael Geerts (semifinals)

== Draw ==
Key

- Q = Qualifier
- WC = Wild card
- LL = Lucky loser
- Alt = Alternate
- ITF = ITF entry
- PR = Protected ranking
- SR = Special ranking
- SE = Special exempt
- JE = Junior exempt
- JR = Junior Accelerator Programme entrant
- CO = College Accelerator Programme entrant
- NG = Next Gen Accelerator Program entrant
- w/o = Walkover
- r = Retired
- d = Defaulted

First round
1	(France) J Eysseric (Mexico) MÁ Reyes-Varela	1	4
WC	(France) M Guinard (France) G Jacq	6	6
(Peru) A Huertas del Pino (Peru) C Huertas del Pino	4	6	[10]
(United Kingdom) S Duncan (United Kingdom) M Willis	6	4	[7]
3	(Greece) Pe Tsitsipas (Netherlands) S Verbeek	6	6
Alt	(Argentina) M Navone (Brazil) M Pucinelli de Almeida	4	4
(United States) A Lawson (Greece) M Pervolarakis	w/o
(Dominican Republic) N Hardt (Japan) K Uchida
WC	(France) M Bourgue (France) L Pouille	2	2
(Romania) A Jecan (Sweden) DN Mădăraș	6	6
(Spain) Í Cervantes (Spain) P Martínez	6^{4}	3
4	(France) D Added (Belgium) M Geerts	7^{7}	6
(Latvia) M Lībietis (United States) H Reese	7	6
(Australia) A Taylor (Australia) J Taylor	5	3
(Sweden) F Bergevi (Netherlands) M Veldheer	6^{6}	4
2	(Germany) C Frantzen (Germany) H Jebens	7^{8}	6

Quarterfinals
WC	(France) M Guinard (France) G Jacq	6	6
(Peru) A Huertas del Pino (Peru) C Huertas del Pino	4	2
3	(Greece) Pe Tsitsipas (Netherlands) S Verbeek	7^{7}	6
(United States) A Lawson (Greece) M Pervolarakis	6^{5}	3
(Romania) A Jecan (Sweden) DN Mădăraș	0	2
4	(France) D Added (Belgium) M Geerts	6	6
(Latvia) M Lībietis (United States) H Reese	4	7^{7}	[2]
2	(Germany) C Frantzen (Germany) H Jebens	6	6^{5}	[10]

Semifinals
WC	(France) M Guinard (France) G Jacq	7	6
3	(Greece) Pe Tsitsipas (Netherlands) S Verbeek	5	4
4	(France) D Added (Belgium) M Geerts	6^{2}	4
2	(Germany) C Frantzen (Germany) H Jebens	7^{7}	6

Final
WC	(France) M Guinard (France) G Jacq	6	2	[10]
2	(Germany) C Frantzen (Germany) H Jebens	4	6	[7]
