= 2024 Open Sopra Steria de Lyon – Singles =

Singles
- 2024 Open Sopra Steria de Lyon

Final
- Champion: (France) Hugo Gaston
- Runner-up: (France) Alexandre Müller
- Score: 6–2, 1–6, 6–1

Events
Singles	Doubles
- Open Sopra Steria de Lyon

Felipe Meligeni Alves was the defending champion but chose not to defend his title.

Hugo Gaston won the title after defeating Alexandre Müller 6–2, 1–6, 6–1 in the final.

== Seeds ==
1. (France) Hugo Gaston (champion)
2. (France) Alexandre Müller (final)
3. (France) Luca Van Assche (quarterfinals)
4. (Argentina) Camilo Ugo Carabelli (first round)
5. (Monaco) Valentin Vacherot (withdrew)
6. (France) Ugo Blanchet (second round)
7. (France) Lucas Pouille (withdrew)
8. (Switzerland) Alexander Ritschard (first round)

== Draw ==
Key

- Q = Qualifier
- WC = Wild card
- LL = Lucky loser
- Alt = Alternate
- ITF = ITF entry
- PR = Protected ranking
- SR = Special ranking
- SE = Special exempt
- JE = Junior exempt
- JR = Junior Accelerator Programme entrant
- CO = College Accelerator Programme entrant
- NG = Next Gen Accelerator Program entrant
- w/o = Walkover
- r = Retired
- d = Defaulted

=== Finals ===
Semifinals
1	(France) Hugo Gaston	7^{7}	6
(France) Kyrian Jacquet	6^{3}	4
Q	(Belgium) Raphaël Collignon	6	2	2
2	(France) Alexandre Müller	1	6	6

Final
1	(France) Hugo Gaston	6	1	6
2	(France) Alexandre Müller	2	6	1

=== Top half ===
First round
1	(France) H Gaston	6	7^{11}
(Spain) D Rincón	0	6^{9}
Alt	(Belgium) G Onclin	2	6^{0}
(France) C Tabur	6	7^{7}
(France) M Janvier	7^{7}	6
(United States) T Boyer	6^{4}	3
Q	(Georgia (country)) N Basilashvili	7	6
8	(Switzerland) A Ritschard	5	2
4	(Argentina) C Ugo Carabelli	4	2
LL	(Spain) C Taberner	6	6
(France) K Jacquet	6	3	6
WC	(France) G Debru	1	6	3
Alt	(France) T Lamasine	3	6	2
(France) Q Halys	6	1	6
(France) C Hemery	5	3
LL	(France) M Bourgue	7	6

Second round
1	(France) H Gaston	6	6^{1}	6
(France) C Tabur	2	7^{7}	3
(France) M Janvier	5	1
Q	(Georgia (country)) N Basilashvili	7	6
LL	(Spain) C Taberner	6	3	3
(France) K Jacquet	2	6	6
(France) Q Halys	6	7
LL	(France) M Bourgue	2	5

Quarterfinals
1	(France) H Gaston	4	6	6
Q	(Georgia (country)) N Basilashvili	6	4	3
(France) K Jacquet	7	1
(France) Q Halys	5	0^{r}

Semifinals
1	(France) H Gaston	7^{7}	6
(France) K Jacquet	6^{3}	4

=== Bottom half ===
First round
LL	(Spain) D Jordà Sanchis	6	5	7^{7}
(France) H Grenier	3	7	6^{2}
Q	(Germany) S Fanselow	1	3
Q	(Belgium) R Collignon	6	6
Q	(France) L Poullain	4	1
Q	(Spain) J Barranco Cosano	6	6
WC	(France) A Géa	6	4	6^{4}
3	(France) L Van Assche	4	6	7^{7}
6	(France) U Blanchet	4
(France) M Guinard	1^{r}
Q	(Argentina) FA Gómez	4	1^{r}
Alt	(Romania) FC Jianu	6	2
WC	(France) Maé Malige	1	2
A Kachmazov	6	6
(Argentina) JP Ficovich	5	0
2	(France) A Müller	7	6

Second round
LL	(Spain) D Jordà Sanchis	0	5
Q	(Belgium) R Collignon	6	7
Q	(Spain) J Barranco Cosano	2	5
3	(France) L Van Assche	6	7
6	(France) U Blanchet	4	3
Alt	(Romania) FC Jianu	6	6
A Kachmazov	0	2
2	(France) A Müller	6	6

Quarterfinals
Q	(Belgium) R Collignon	7	6
3	(France) L Van Assche	5	3
Alt	(Romania) FC Jianu	2	2
2	(France) A Müller	6	6

Semifinals
Q	(Belgium) R Collignon	6	2	2
2	(France) A Müller	1	6	6
