= 2018 Open Sopra Steria de Lyon – Doubles =

Doubles
- 2018 Open Sopra Steria de Lyon

Final
- Champions: (France) Elliot Benchetrit (France) Geoffrey Blancaneaux
- Runners-up: (Chinese Taipei) Hsieh Cheng-peng (Switzerland) Luca Margaroli
- Score: 6–3, 4–6, [10–7]

Events
Singles	Doubles
- Open Sopra Steria de Lyon

Sander Gillé and Joran Vliegen were the defending champions but only Vliegen chose to defend his title, partnering Rameez Junaid. Vliegen lost in the quarterfinals to Pedro Martínez and David Vega Hernández.

Elliot Benchetrit and Geoffrey Blancaneaux won the title after defeating Hsieh Cheng-peng and Luca Margaroli 6–3, 4–6, [10–7] in the final.

== Seeds ==
1. (Ukraine) Denys Molchanov / (Slovakia) Igor Zelenay (semifinals)
2. (South Africa) Ruan Roelofse / (Indonesia) Christopher Rungkat (quarterfinals)
3. (Australia) Rameez Junaid / (Belgium) Joran Vliegen (quarterfinals)
4. (Chinese Taipei) Hsieh Cheng-peng / (Switzerland) Luca Margaroli (final)

== Draw ==
Key

- Q = Qualifier
- WC = Wild card
- LL = Lucky loser
- Alt = Alternate
- ITF = ITF entry
- PR = Protected ranking
- SR = Special ranking
- SE = Special exempt
- JE = Junior exempt
- JR = Junior Accelerator Programme entrant
- CO = College Accelerator Programme entrant
- NG = Next Gen Accelerator Program entrant
- w/o = Walkover
- r = Retired
- d = Defaulted

First round
1	(Ukraine) D Molchanov (Slovakia) I Zelenay	6	6
(Chile) C Garín (United States) M Krueger	3	2
(Venezuela) R Maytín (Sweden) A Siljeström	5	6	[10]
WC	(France) B Bonzi (France) G Jacq	7	3	[3]
4	(Chinese Taipei) C-p Hsieh (Switzerland) L Margaroli	6	6
(France) G Sakharov (Russia) A Vatutin	2	1
(Portugal) B Saraiva (Portugal) P Sousa	5	7	[10]
(Croatia) I Sabanov (Croatia) M Sabanov	7	5	[8]
(Spain) P Martínez (Spain) D Vega Hernández	6	6
(France) K de Schepper (France) T Lamasine	2	4
(Ecuador) G Escobar (Brazil) F Neis	6	6^{6}	[8]
3	(Australia) R Junaid (Belgium) J Vliegen	2	7^{8}	[10]
WC	(France) Alexandre Favrot (France) Q Halys	2	4
WC	(France) E Benchetrit (France) G Blancaneaux	6	6
(Mexico) H Hach Verdugo (Venezuela) LD Martínez	6	4	[4]
2	(South Africa) R Roelofse (Indonesia) C Rungkat	4	6	[10]

Quarterfinals
1	(Ukraine) D Molchanov (Slovakia) I Zelenay	6	6
(Venezuela) R Maytín (Sweden) A Siljeström	2	4
4	(Chinese Taipei) C-p Hsieh (Switzerland) L Margaroli	7^{8}	4	[10]
(Portugal) B Saraiva (Portugal) P Sousa	6^{6}	6	[5]
(Spain) P Martínez (Spain) D Vega Hernández	1	7	[10]
3	(Australia) R Junaid (Belgium) J Vliegen	6	5	[3]
WC	(France) E Benchetrit (France) G Blancaneaux	6	3	[10]
2	(South Africa) R Roelofse (Indonesia) C Rungkat	3	6	[3]

Semifinals
1	(Ukraine) D Molchanov (Slovakia) I Zelenay	7	6^{8}	[6]
4	(Chinese Taipei) C-p Hsieh (Switzerland) L Margaroli	5	7^{10}	[10]
(Spain) P Martínez (Spain) D Vega Hernández	3	6	[3]
WC	(France) E Benchetrit (France) G Blancaneaux	6	3	[10]

Final
4	(Chinese Taipei) C-p Hsieh (Switzerland) L Margaroli	3	6	[7]
WC	(France) E Benchetrit (France) G Blancaneaux	6	4	[10]
