= 2024 Open Sopra Steria de Lyon =

- Date: 10–16 June
- Edition: 8th
- Surface: Clay
- Location: Lyon, France

Champions

Singles
- (France) Hugo Gaston

Doubles
- (France) Manuel Guinard / (France) Grégoire Jacq
- Open Sopra Steria de Lyon

The 2024 Open Sopra Steria de Lyon was a professional tennis tournament played on clay courts. It was the 8th edition of the tournament which was part of the 2024 ATP Challenger Tour. It took place in Lyon, France, between 10 and 16 June 2024.

== Singles main-draw entrants ==
=== Seeds ===
Country	Player	Rank^{1}	Seed
FRA	Hugo Gaston	88	1
FRA	Alexandre Müller	90	2
FRA	Luca Van Assche	103	3
ARG	Camilo Ugo Carabelli	110	4
~~MON~~	~~Valentin Vacherot~~	~~116~~	~~5~~
FRA	Ugo Blanchet	160	6
~~FRA~~	~~Lucas Pouille~~	~~165~~	~~7~~
SUI	Alexander Ritschard	184	8

- ^{1} Rankings are as of 27 May 2024.

=== Other entrants ===
The following players received wildcards into the singles main draw:

- (France) Gabriel Debru
- (France) Arthur Géa
- (France) Maé Malige

The following players received entry into the singles main draw as alternates:

- (Romania) Filip Cristian Jianu
- (France) Tristan Lamasine
- (Belgium) Gauthier Onclin

The following players received entry from the qualifying draw:

- (Spain) Javier Barranco Cosano
- (Georgia (country)) Nikoloz Basilashvili
- (Belgium) Raphaël Collignon
- (Germany) Sebastian Fanselow
- (Argentina) Federico Agustín Gómez
- (France) Lucas Poullain

The following players received entry as lucky losers:

- (France) Mathias Bourgue
- (Spain) David Jordà Sanchis
- (Spain) Carlos Taberner

== Champions ==
=== Singles ===
- (France) Hugo Gaston def. (France) Alexandre Müller 6–2, 1–6, 6–1.

=== Doubles ===
- (France) Manuel Guinard / (France) Grégoire Jacq def. (Greece) Markos Kalovelonis / (Ukraine) Vladyslav Orlov 4–6, 6–3, [10–6].
