= Félix Auger-Aliassime =

Canadian tennis player (born 2000)

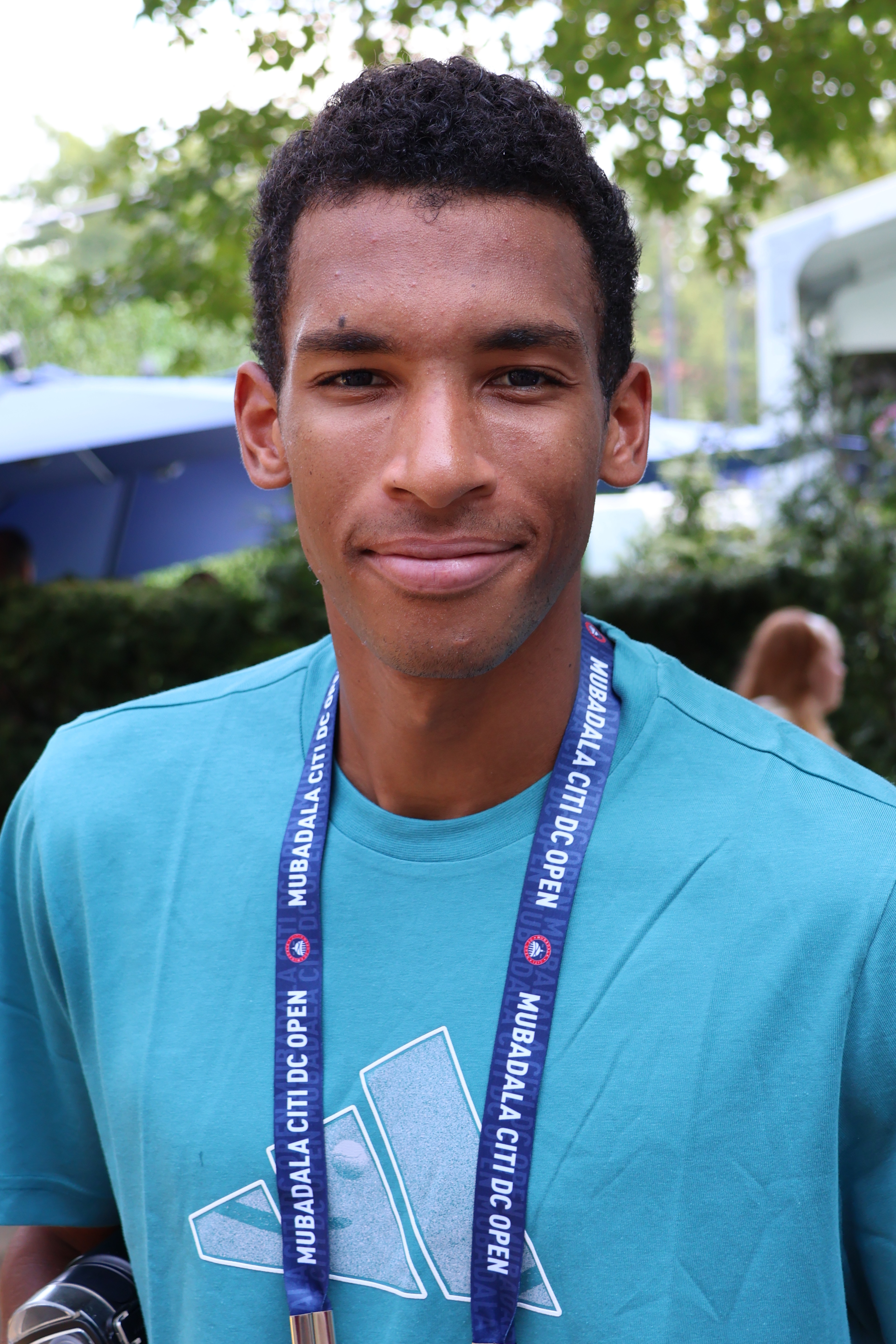
- Auger-Aliassime at the 2023 Washington Open
- Country (sports): Canada
- Residence: Monte Carlo, Monaco
- Born: August 8, 2000 (age 26) Montreal, Quebec, Canada
- Height: 1.93 m (6 ft 4 in)
- Turned pro: 2017
- Plays: Right-handed (two-handed backhand)
- Coach: Frédéric Fontang (2016–2026); Toni Nadal (2021–2024); Ivan Ljubičić (2026–present)
- Prize money: US $24,782,349: 28th all-time leader in earnings

Singles
- Career record: 302 - 189
- Career titles: 9
- Highest ranking: No. 4 (June 8, 2026)
- Current ranking: No. 17 (November 16, 2026)

Grand Slam singles results
- Australian Open: QF (2022)
- French Open: QF (2026)
- Wimbledon: QF (2021, 2026)
- US Open: SF (2021, 2025)

Other tournaments
- Tour Finals: SF (2025)
- Olympic Games: SF – 4th (2024)

Doubles
- Career record: 37–43
- Career titles: 1
- Highest ranking: No. 60 (November 1, 2021)
- Current ranking: No. 581 (August 24, 2026)

Grand Slam doubles results
- Australian Open: 1R (2021)

Other doubles tournaments
- Olympic Games: 1R (2024)

Grand Slam mixed doubles results
- US Open: 1R (2026)

Other mixed doubles tournaments
- Olympic Games: Bronze (2024)

Team competitions
- Davis Cup: W (2022)
- Hopman Cup: W (2025)
Medal record
Representing Canada
Olympic Games
Bronze medal – third place	2024 Paris	Mixed doubles
- Last updated on: 24 August 2026.

Félix Auger-Aliassime (French pronunciation: [feliks oʒe aljasim]; born August 8, 2000), sometimes referred to as "FAA", is a Canadian professional tennis player. His career-high ATP singles ranking is world No. 4 achieved on 8 June 2026. He has been ranked No. 60 in doubles, reached in November 2021. Auger-Aliassime has won nine ATP Tour titles in singles and one in doubles. He was also part of the victorious Canadian team at the 2022 ATP Cup and the 2022 Davis Cup, and won a bronze medal in mixed doubles at the 2024 Paris Olympics with Gabriela Dabrowski. He is the current No. 1 singles player from Canada.

Auger-Aliassime began competing on the professional tour at a young age. He was the youngest player to win a match on the ATP Challenger Tour at 14 years and 11 months old. As a junior player, he was the junior world No. 2, and won the boys' doubles title at the 2015 US Open with Denis Shapovalov and the boys' singles title at the 2016 US Open.

On the ATP Tour, Auger-Aliassime made his breakthrough as an 18-year-old in 2019, when he reached three tour finals and entered the world's top 100 and top 25. Over the next few years, he reached eight ATP Tour finals as well as the semifinals at the 2021 US Open. In 2022, Auger-Aliassime won four tour titles and helped lead Canada to titles at the ATP Cup and Davis Cup. Following subsequent injuries, he resurged in 2025 to win three more titles, reach another major semifinal at the 2025 US Open, and break into the world's top 5. Auger-Aliassime is the second-highest-ranked Canadian man in ATP rankings history and tied for second-highest-ranked Canadian player in either ATP or WTA rankings history. He was selected as the 2022 Canadian Press athlete of the year. He completed a set of all four major quarterfinals at the 2026 French Open, becoming the first Canadian player to do so.

== Early life ==
Auger-Aliassime was born in Montreal and raised in L'Ancienne-Lorette, a suburb of Quebec City. His father, Sam Aliassime, is of Togolese descent, and his mother, Marie Auger, is of French Canadian descent. His father was a tennis instructor. He has an older sister, Malika, who also plays tennis. He started playing tennis at four, and trained at the Club Avantage as a member of the Académie de Tennis Hérisset-Bordeleau in Quebec City. In 2012, he won the Open Super Auray in the age 11 to 12 category. He has been a member of Tennis Canada's National Training Centre in Montreal since the fall of 2014.

== Junior career ==
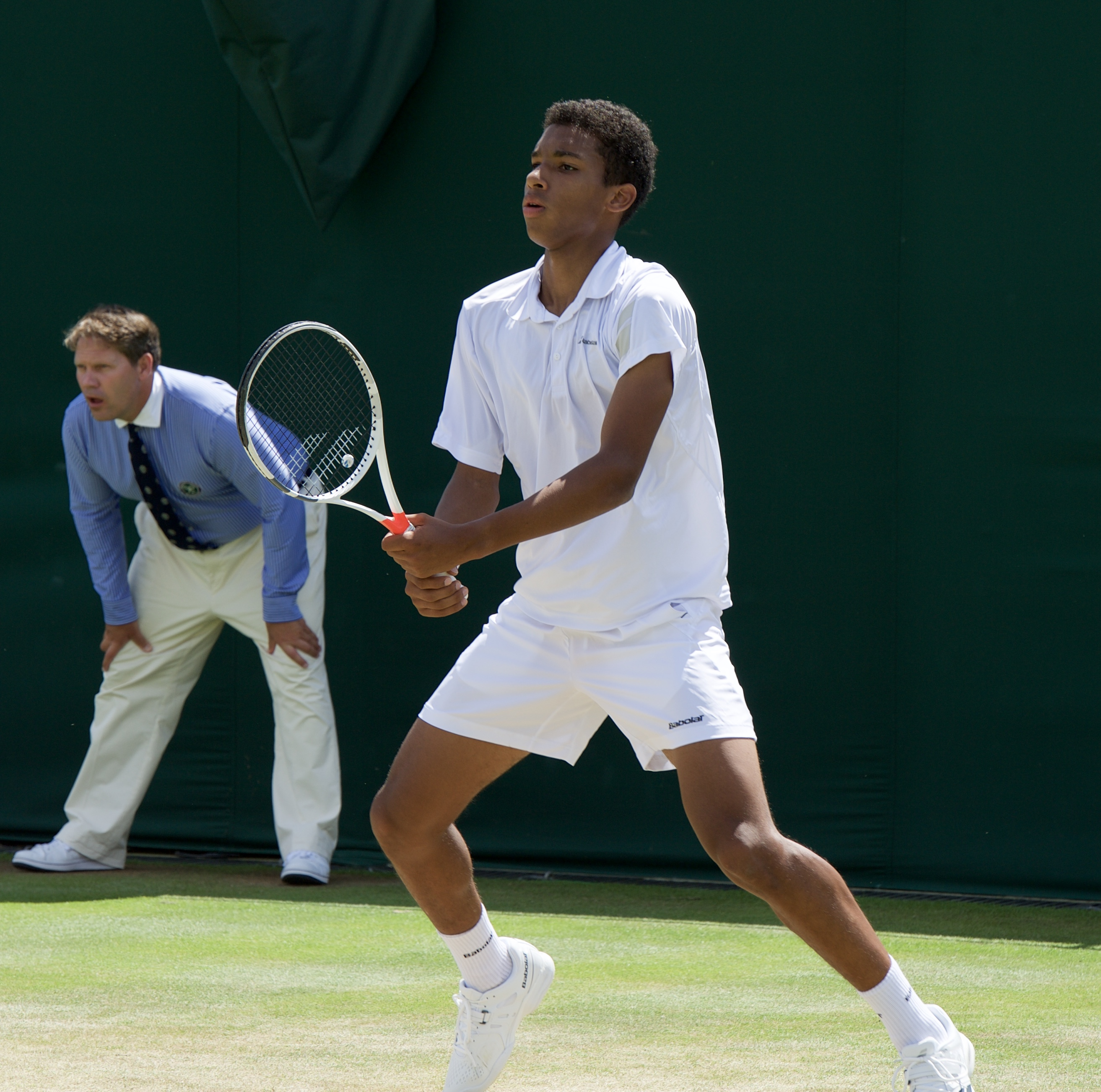
Auger-Aliassime at the 2016 Wimbledon Championships

In February 2015, Auger-Aliassime won his first ITF junior singles title at the G3 in Querétaro. A week later, he won his second straight ITF junior singles title and first doubles title at the G4 in Zapopan. In late August 2015, he won his first junior G1 title with a victory over compatriot Denis Shapovalov in College Park. At the US Open in September 2015, his first junior Grand Slam, he reached the second round in singles and won the doubles title with Shapovalov. In October 2015, Auger-Aliassime and compatriots Denis Shapovalov and Benjamin Sigouin won the Junior Davis Cup title, the first time in history for Canada. In December 2015 at the Eddie Herr International Tennis Championship, he won his second G1 singles title after defeating Alex de Minaur in the final. At the junior event of the French Open in June 2016, he reached his first Grand Slam singles final where he was defeated by Geoffrey Blancaneaux in three sets, despite holding a championship point. In July 2016 at Wimbledon, Auger-Aliassime advanced to the quarterfinals in singles and to the final in doubles with Denis Shapovalov. At the US Open in September 2016, he won the boys' singles title with a straight-sets victory over Miomir Kecmanović. He reached the doubles final as well, with fellow Canadian Benjamin Sigouin.

As a junior, he compiled a singles win–loss record of 79–19.

Grand Slam results – Singles:

Australian Open: 3R (2016)
French Open: F (2016)
Wimbledon: QF (2016)
US Open: W (2016)

Grand Slam results – Doubles:

Australian Open: 1R (2016)
French Open: 2R (2016)
Wimbledon: F (2016)
US Open: W (2015)

== Professional career ==
=== 2015–16: Challenger and ranking records ===
In March 2015 at the Challenger de Drummondville, Auger-Aliassime became the youngest player in history to qualify for an ATP Challenger main draw at 14 1/2 years old. He defeated compatriot Jack Mingjie Lin, former world No. 67, Chris Guccione, and world No. 433, Fritz Wolmarans, to do so. He, however, was forced to withdraw before playing his first-round match due to an abdominal strain. With the points earned, Auger-Aliassime once again made history as the first player born in the 2000s to have an ATP ranking. At the Challenger de Granby in July 2015, he qualified for his second ATP Challenger main draw with victories over fellow Canadian Jack Mingjie Lin and world No. 574, Jean-Yves Aubone. He won his opening round in straight sets over world No. 493 Andrew Whittington, becoming the youngest player to win a main-draw ATP Challenger match. In the next round, he scored an upset over world No. 205, Darian King, in straight sets. He was stopped by world No. 145 Yoshihito Nishioka in three sets in the quarterfinals. After his run to the quarterfinals, Auger-Aliassime became the youngest player ever to break the top 800 on the ATP rankings at No. 749.

In May 2016, Auger-Aliassime reached his first professional singles final at the $10k event in Lleida, falling to Ramkumar Ramanathan. In November 2016, he won his first pro title with a victory over Juan Manuel Benitez Chavarriaga at the ITF Futures in Birmingham. The next week at the Futures in Niceville, he captured his first pro doubles title with partner Patrick Kypson.

=== 2017: First ATP Challenger title, top 200 ===
In January, Auger-Aliassime reached the final of the ITF Futures in Plantation, but lost to Roberto Cid Subervi in three sets. In March, he won the title in Sherbrooke over Gleb Sakharov, his second ITF Futures. The next week, he advanced to the semifinals of the $75k ATP Challenger in Drummondville with a win over world No. 124, Peter Polansky, but lost to compatriot and eventual champion Denis Shapovalov. In June at the Open de Lyon, Auger-Aliassime captured his maiden ATP Challenger, becoming the first 16-year-old to win a Challenger singles title since Bernard Tomic in 2009 at the Maccabi Men's Challenger and the seventh-youngest in history. In September at the Copa Sevilla, he won his second ATP Challenger title of the season after defeating former world No. 56, Íñigo Cervantes, in the final. With this win, he became the youngest player to break the top 200 since Rafael Nadal in December 2002 and the second-youngest to win multiple ATP Challenger titles, standing behind only Richard Gasquet.

=== 2018: ATP Tour debut ===
In February in Budapest, Auger-Aliassime captured his first ATP Challenger doubles title, defeating Marin Draganja and Tomislav Draganja with a partner Nicola Kuhn. Auger-Aliassime also made his debut in an ATP main draw at the Rotterdam Open, losing in three sets to world No. 38, Filip Krajinović, in the first round. In March at Indian Wells, he qualified for his first ATP Masters 1000 main draw. He faced fellow Canadian Vasek Pospisil in the first round, defeating him in straight sets to win his first tour-level match. He was defeated in the next round by another compatriot, Milos Raonic. In April, Auger-Aliassime was awarded a wildcard for the Monte-Carlo Masters where he lost his opener in three sets to world No. 55, Mischa Zverev. In June at the ATP Challenger in Lyon, he successfully defended his title with a victory over Johan Tatlot in the final and became the youngest player in history to defend an ATP Challenger title. In August, Auger-Aliassime received a wildcard to compete in the main draw of the 2018 Rogers Cup. In the first round, he defeated Lucas Pouille in two sets and in the second round, he was defeated by Daniil Medvedev. Auger-Aliassime earned a spot through three qualifying matches to reach the main draw of the US Open. He then retired in the first round against countryman Denis Shapovalov after suffering from heart palpitations brought on by extreme heat.

=== 2019: Three ATP and Davis Cup finals ===
At age 18, Auger-Aliassime became the youngest-ever ATP 500 finalist with his win over Pablo Cuevas to reach the Rio Open title match. In the final, he lost to Laslo Đere in straight sets. At his next tournament in São Paulo, Auger-Aliassime lost to Đere again – this time in the quarterfinals. At the Indian Wells Masters, he achieved his first victory against a top-ten player, defeating Stefanos Tsitsipas (who was No. 10 in the ATP rankings at that time) in straight sets in the second round.

At the Miami Open, Auger-Aliassime beat Nikoloz Basilashvili in the fourth round and Borna Ćorić in the quarterfinals to become the youngest semifinalist in the tournament's history. In the semifinals, he lost to defending champion and eventual runner-up John Isner in two tight sets, despite leading by a break in both sets. He received a wildcard to play in the Madrid Open. Auger-Aliassime made it to the second round where he was defeated by Rafael Nadal, in straight sets. At the Lyon Open, he worked his way into his second ATP final, by beating John Millman, Steve Johnson, and Nikoloz Basilashvili, the No. 1 seed. He was then defeated by Benoît Paire, in straight sets.

In the Mercedes Cup he made it to his third final, by defeating experienced players like Ernests Gulbis, Gilles Simon, and Dustin Brown. He received a walkover into the final when Milos Raonic withdrew. In the final he was defeated by Matteo Berrettini, despite having set points to win the second set. At Queen's Club, Auger-Aliassime defeated Grigor Dimitrov and Nick Kyrgios, both matches were played on the same day as the tournament program was delayed by rain earlier during the week. In the quarterfinals, he recorded his second win against Stefanos Tsitsipas. Auger-Aliassime lost in the semifinals to eventual champion Feliciano López.

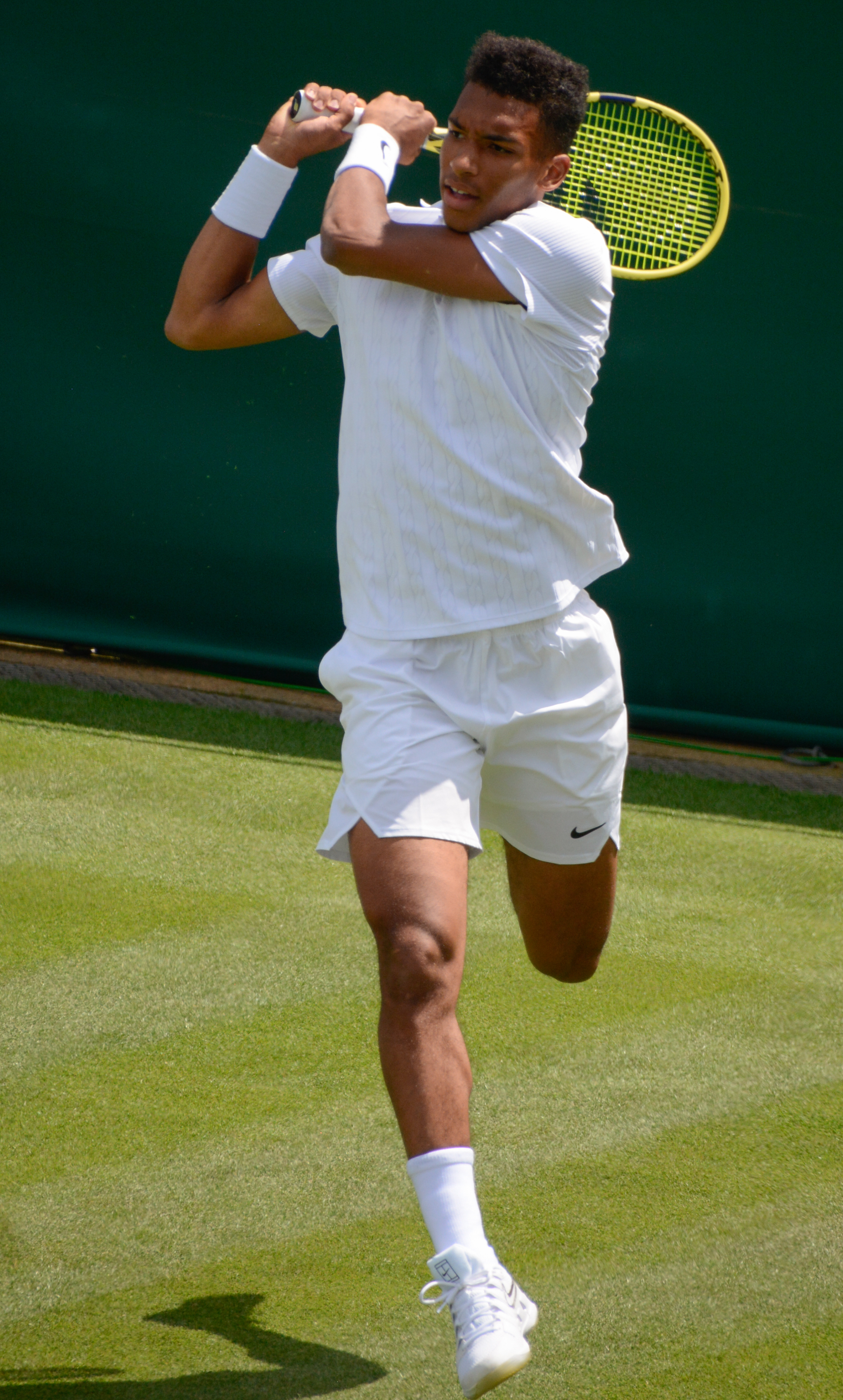
Auger-Aliassime at the 2019 Wimbledon Championships

At Wimbledon, he entered as the 19th seed and earned his first win as a pro in a major, by defeating compatriot Vasek Pospisil. After beating Corentin Moutet in four sets, he was stopped by Ugo Humbert in the third round.

At the US Open he lost to in the first round to Denis Shapovalov for the second straight year.

=== 2020: Two ATP singles finals and doubles title ===
At the 2020 Australian Open, Auger-Aliassime lost in the first round to Ernests Gulbis. Auger-Aliassime was seeded 15th at the 2020 US Open and advanced to the fourth round after defeating Thiago Monteiro, Andy Murray, and Corentin Moutet in the first three rounds. He then lost in straight sets to the second seed and eventual champion Dominic Thiem.

Auger-Aliassime then participated in the rescheduled French Open, where he fell to Yoshihito Nishioka in the first round. In October, he reached the final of the Bett1Hulks Indoors tournament in Cologne, Germany, losing to home favorite, Alexander Zverev. Auger-Aliassime claimed the doubles title at the Paris Masters with partner Hubert Hurkacz, saving five championship points in his first doubles final.

=== 2021: US Open semifinal, top 10 ===
At the 2021 Australian Open, Auger-Aliassime lost in the fourth round to Russian qualifier Aslan Karatsev, despite being two sets to love up. In April, he hired Rafael Nadal's uncle and former coach, Toni Nadal, as a new coach ahead of the clay-court season. At the French Open, Auger-Aliassime lost in the first round to Andreas Seppi. He also lost his eighth final at the Stuttgart Open to Marin Čilić.

At the Halle Open, he reached the semifinals by defeating 10-time tournament champion and fifth seed, Roger Federer, in the second round to secure his fourth top-10 victory. Felix then defeated qualifier Marcos Giron in the quarterfinals but lost to the eventual champion, Ugo Humbert. In the same tournament in doubles, he reached the final partnering Hubert Hurkacz but lost to third seeded German Kevin Krawietz and Romanian Horia Tecău.

At Wimbledon, he reached his first major quarterfinal with a five-set win over world No. 6 and fourth seed Alexander Zverev, beating the German for only the fifth top-10 win of his career. He became the fifth Canadian man to reach the Wimbledon quarterfinals after tenth seed Denis Shapovalov did so in the same tournament. It marked the first time that two Canadian men together reached a Grand Slam quarterfinal. With this successful run he entered the top 15 in the rankings. He then lost to seventh seed and eventual finalist Matteo Berrettini, in four sets in the quarterfinals.

At the rescheduled 2020 Tokyo Olympics, Auger-Aliassime was set to play defending gold medalist Andy Murray in the first round. However, Murray withdrew from singles due to a calf injury, and Auger-Aliassime was upset by his replacement, 190th ranked Australian Max Purcell. At the Washington Open, seeded second, Auger-Aliassime was upset by 130th ranked American wildcard player Jenson Brooksby in the third round. At the Canadian Open, seeded No. 9, Auger-Aliassime was upset by Dušan Lajović in the second round.

At the US Open, Auger-Aliassime reached his maiden major semifinals following wins over 18th-seed Roberto Bautista Agut, Frances Tiafoe, and Carlos Alcaraz (the latter via a retirement). There, he lost to world No. 2, Daniil Medvedev, in straight sets. He became the youngest player to play in the semifinals since 2009. Following his run at the US Open, Felix reached a career-high world No. 11 ranking on 13 September 2021. He reached the semifinals at the Stockholm Open where he lost to defending champion fellow Canadian Denis Shapovalov. As a result, he entered the top 10 on 15 November 2021.

=== 2022: Davis Cup winner, four titles ===
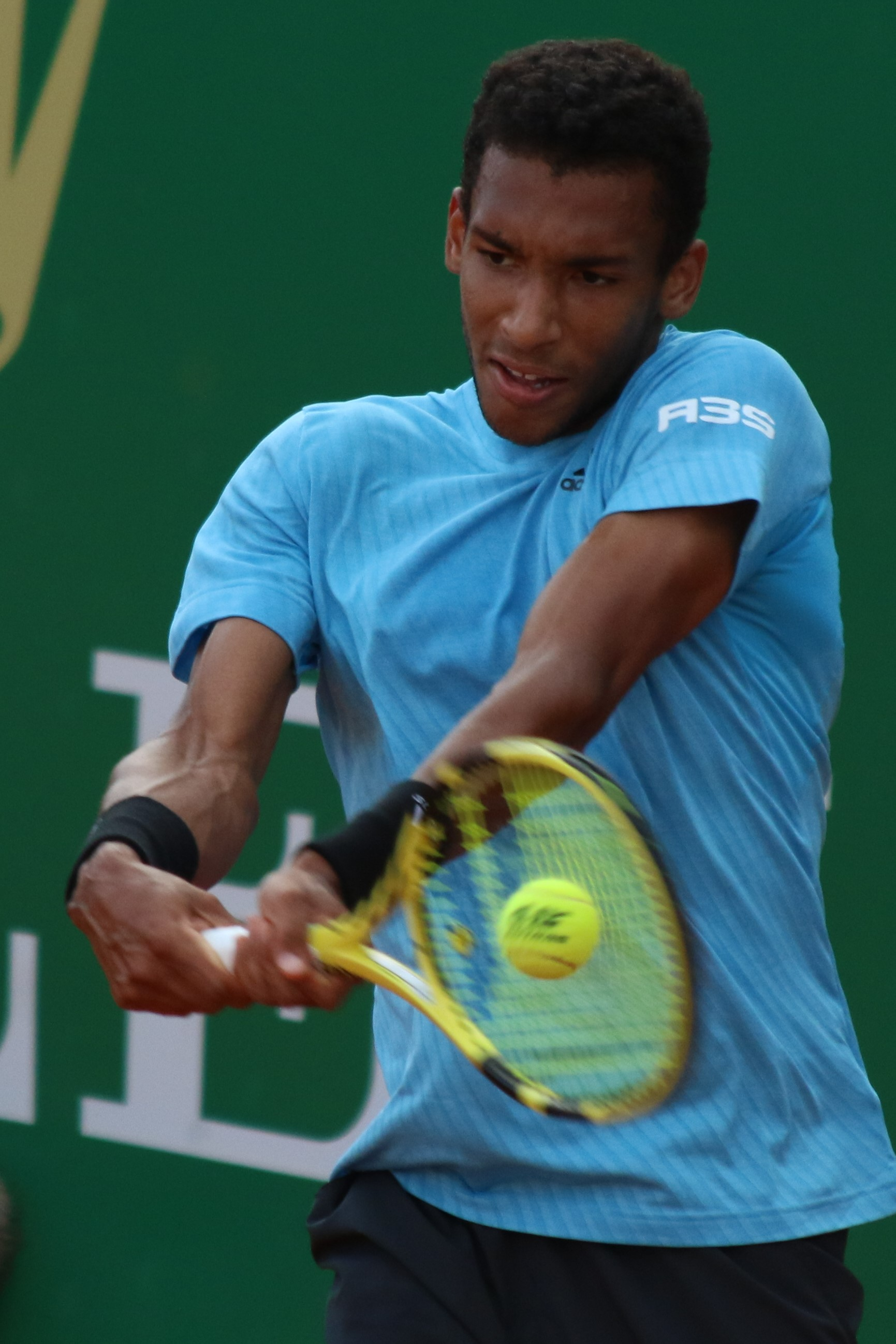
Auger-Aliassime at the 2022 Monte-Carlo Masters

Auger-Aliassime started his 2022 season at the ATP Cup, in which he was part of the winning team. He played for Canada along with teammate Denis Shapovalov where they defeated Roberto Bautista Agut and Pablo Carreño Busta, who played for Spain, in the final. As a result, he hit a new career-high of world No. 9 on January 10, 2022.

Auger-Aliassime subsequently entered the Australian Open seeded ninth, where he beat Emil Ruusuvuori in the first round in five sets, despite receiving a bagel in the second set. He beat Alejandro Davidovich Fokina in the second round, and defeated 24th seed Dan Evans in the third. He defeated 27th seed Marin Čilić in the fourth round, before losing to number two seed Daniil Medvedev in five sets in the quarterfinals, despite being two sets up.

Auger-Aliassime entered the 2022 Rotterdam Open seeded third. After wins against Egor Gerasimov, Andy Murray, Cameron Norrie, and Andrey Rublev, Auger-Aliassime faced top seed Stefanos Tsitsipas in the final. He beat Tsitsipas in straight sets, winning his first ATP Tour title after a record of 0–8 in previous finals. Auger-Aliassime entered the 2022 Open 13 Provence and again reached the finals after straight set wins against Jo-Wilfried Tsonga, Ilya Ivashka, and Roman Safiullin, but lost to Andrey Rublev in straight sets. Auger-Aliassime withdrew from the 2022 Dubai Tennis Championships with a back injury. He was to be seeded third. He entered the 2022 Indian Wells Masters seeded ninth, and lost to Botic van de Zandschulp in the second round.

At the French Open, Auger-Aliassime won his first match at this tournament and came back from two sets to love down for the first time in his career to beat Juan Pablo Varillas in the first round. He then beat another qualifier, Camilo Ugo Carabelli, and Filip Krajinović in straight sets to set up a fourth round encounter with Rafael Nadal. There he became only the third player after Novak Djokovic and John Isner to take Nadal to five sets at this tournament.

At the Canadian Open, Auger-Aliassime lost in the quarterfinals to Casper Ruud after defeating Cameron Norrie in the third round. At the Cincinnati Masters, Auger-Aliassime reached his fourth back-to-back quarterfinal at a Masters 1000 level in the season defeating Jannik Sinner after saving two match points. Next he was upset by eventual winner Borna Ćorić. At the US Open, Auger-Aliassime lost in the second round to Jack Draper in straight sets. Auger-Aliassime made 41 unforced errors compared to just 17 by Draper.

At the 2022 Davis Cup group stage, Auger-Aliassime upset US Open champion and world No. 1, Carlos Alcaraz.

At the Firenze Open, he won his second title with a win over JJ Wolf in the final. He won his second consecutive title and third overall title in Antwerp, defeating Sebastian Korda in the final. He reached a third consecutive final in Basel, recording his second victory of the year over world No. 1 Alcaraz in the semifinals in the process. He defeated Holger Rune in the final in straight sets, winning his third consecutive title, and fourth overall. He became the third player in the season to win an ATP Tour title without dropping a service game, the other two being Taylor Fritz and Nick Kyrgios. In the process he recorded his 50th win of the year and 150th of his career against Miomir Kecmanović in the second round. At the Paris Masters, he reached the semifinals, recording his first match victory against qualifier Mikael Ymer, in a three tight set match with two tiebreaks that lasted 3 hours and 30 minutes. He defeated retiring Gilles Simon for his 15th win to reach his fifth back-to-back Masters 1000 quarterfinal. The previous day on November 2, he also qualified for his first ATP Finals. In the quarterfinals, Auger Aliassime defeated Frances Tiafoe and thus recording his 16th straight win and the second longest streak for the season behind Nadal's 20 wins. As a result of this run he guaranteed himself the world No. 6 spot in the rankings on November 7, 2022. He lost to Holger Rune in the semifinals, ending his 16-match winning streak in a repeat of the Swiss Open title match. At the 2022 ATP Finals, Auger-Aliassime lost to Taylor Fritz in three sets after defeating Rafael Nadal in an earlier group stage match.

In the knock-out stage of the 2022 Davis Cup, Auger-Aliassime teamed up with Denis Shapovalov and Vasek Pospisil for Canada's first Davis Cup Finals win. Canada defeated Australia in the finals after defeating Germany and Italy.

=== 2023: Injuries, one title ===
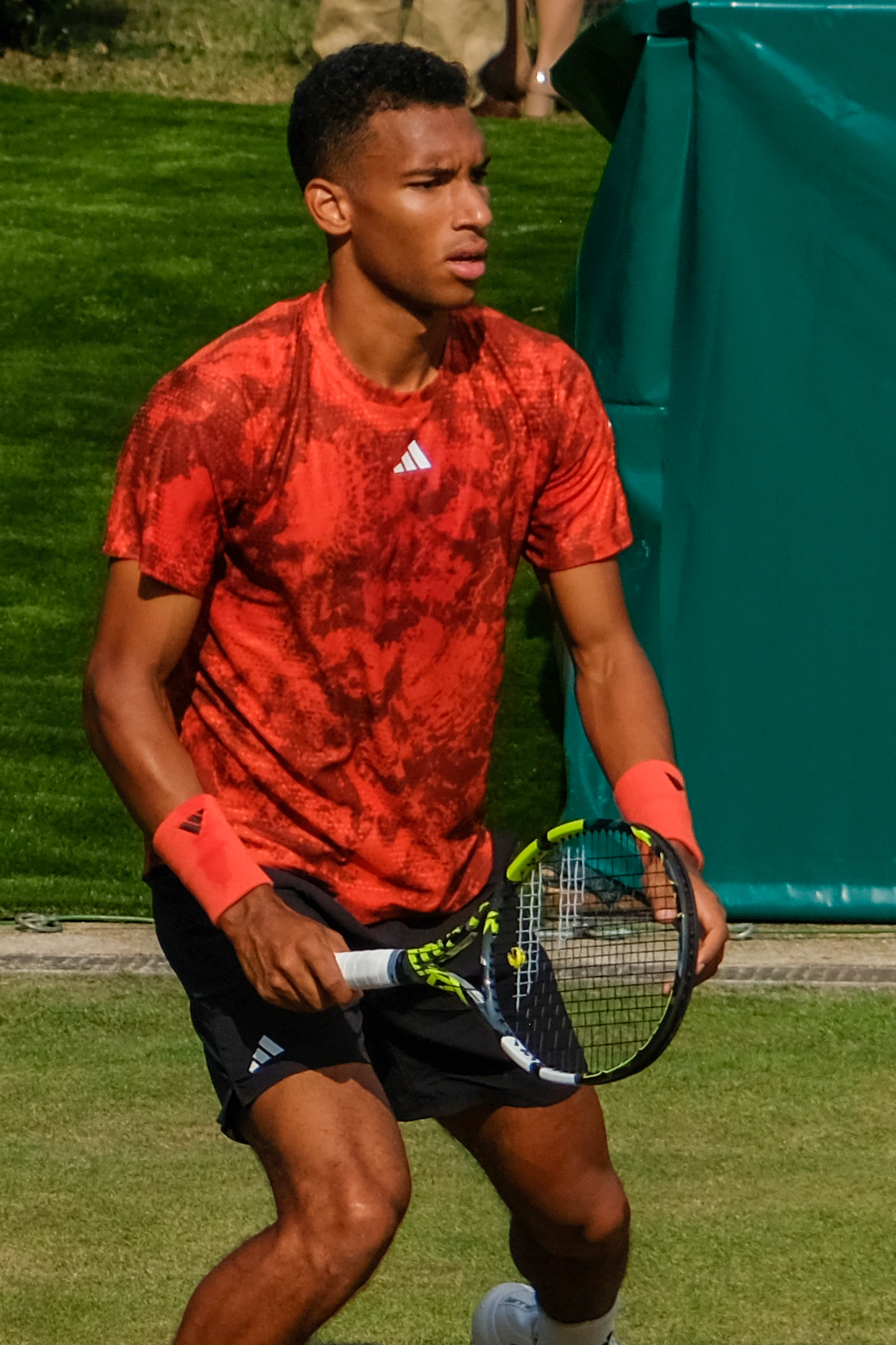
Auger-Aliassime at the 2023 Boodles Challenge

Auger-Aliassime began his season in Adelaide, where he lost in the first round to Alexei Popyrin. At the Australian Open, he reached the fourth round after defeating fellow Canadian veteran Vasek Pospisil, Alex Molčan, and Francisco Cerúndolo before losing to Jiří Lehečka in four sets.

At the Rotterdam Open, he was the defending champion. He reached the quarterfinals following wins over Lorenzo Sonego and Grégoire Barrère but fell to eventual champion Daniil Medvedev in straight sets. Next, at the Qatar Open, he reached the semifinals to set a rematch with Daniil Medvedev but lost in straight sets once more. At the Dubai Championships, he lost to Lorenzo Sonego in the second round.

At the Sunshine double, he arrived at the BNP Paribas Open in Indian Wells as the eighth seed. He defeated Pedro Martínez, Francisco Cerúndolo, and Tommy Paul in the round of 16. In the quarterfinals he lost in straight sets to top seed Carlos Alcaraz. The following week, at the Miami Open, he lost in the third round to Francisco Cerúndolo. Having received a bye in the first round, he lost in the second rounds of the Madrid Open and the Italian Open. He also lost in the first round of the 2023 French Open to Fabio Fognini.

He withdrew from Halle Open with a left knee injury. Due to this injury layoff, he entered the 2023 Wimbledon Championships without having played a grass-court match during the season, and lost to lucky loser Michael Mmoh.

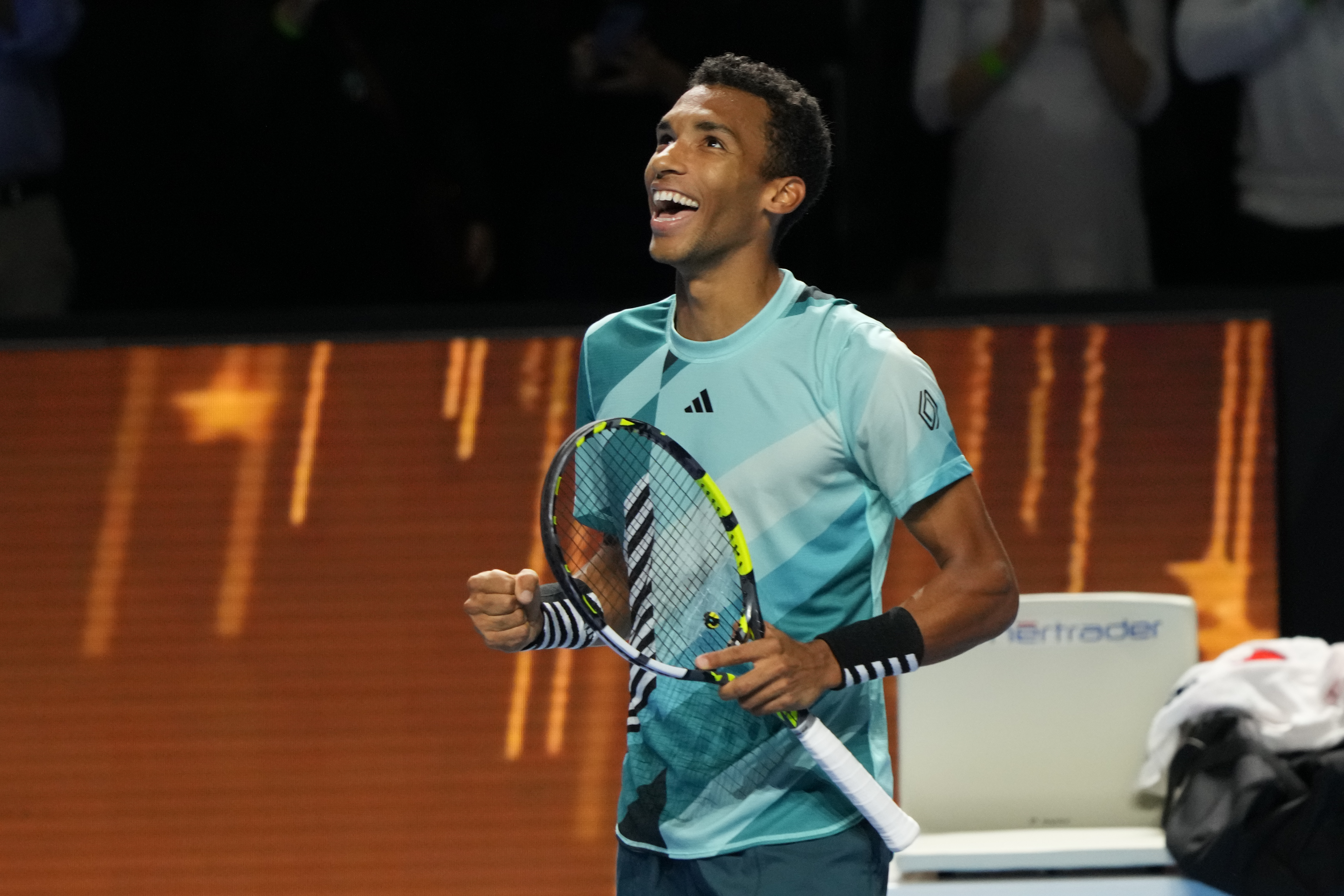
Félix Auger-Aliassime, winner at the Swiss Indoors Basel 2023

Auger-Aliassime entered the US Open seeded fifteenth, where he was defeated by Mackenzie McDonald in the first round. He finally managed to win four matches in a row when he reached the final at the Swiss Indoors where he was the defending champion defeating top seed Holger Rune in straight sets, his first top-10 win of the season. He came into the tournament having won only 4 out of the past 12 matches. He successfully defended his title defeating Polish Hubert Hurkacz in the final. Despite this good result, he fell out of the top 25 to world No. 29 on 13 November 2023.

=== 2024: Olympic bronze, top 20 ===
After a slow start of the season, he further dropped out of top 35 on 18 March 2024 to world No. 36. Ranked No. 35, at the 2024 Mutua Madrid Open he reached his first Masters final after wins over Yoshihito Nishioka, 19th seed Adrian Mannarino, the retirement of Jakub Menšík in the second set, a win over fifth seed Casper Ruud, a walkover from top seed Jannik Sinner and the retirement of 30th seed Jiří Lehečka. As a result, he became the first Canadian man to reach a clay Masters 1000 final and returned to the top 20 in the rankings for the first time since October 2023.

He reached the semifinals at the Paris Olympics defeating Marcos Giron, Maximilian Marterer and upsetting two seeds, fourth seed Daniil Medvedev and sixth seed Casper Ruud. He became the first Canadian player to reach the medal stage in singles at the Olympic Games. Auger-Aliassime lost his semifinal match to second seed Carlos Alcaraz in straight sets, and then lost in the bronze medal match to Lorenzo Musetti. Auger-Aliassime and Gabriela Dabrowski defeated Demi Schuurs and Wesley Koolhoof of the Netherlands, to win a bronze medal in mixed doubles, only the second Olympic tennis medal for Canada.

He reached the round of 16 at the Cincinnati Open defeating again seventh seed Casper Ruud and recorded his 50th Masters win.

=== 2025: Three titles, world No. 5, Americas player No. 1 ===
Auger-Aliassime started the season by winning the Adelaide International to secure his sixth ATP Tour title and first on outdoor hardcourts, defeating Sebastian Korda in the final. In February, he overcame qualifier Aleksandar Kovacevic in the final at the Open Occitanie in Montpellier, France, to claim his second title of the season and seventh of his career.

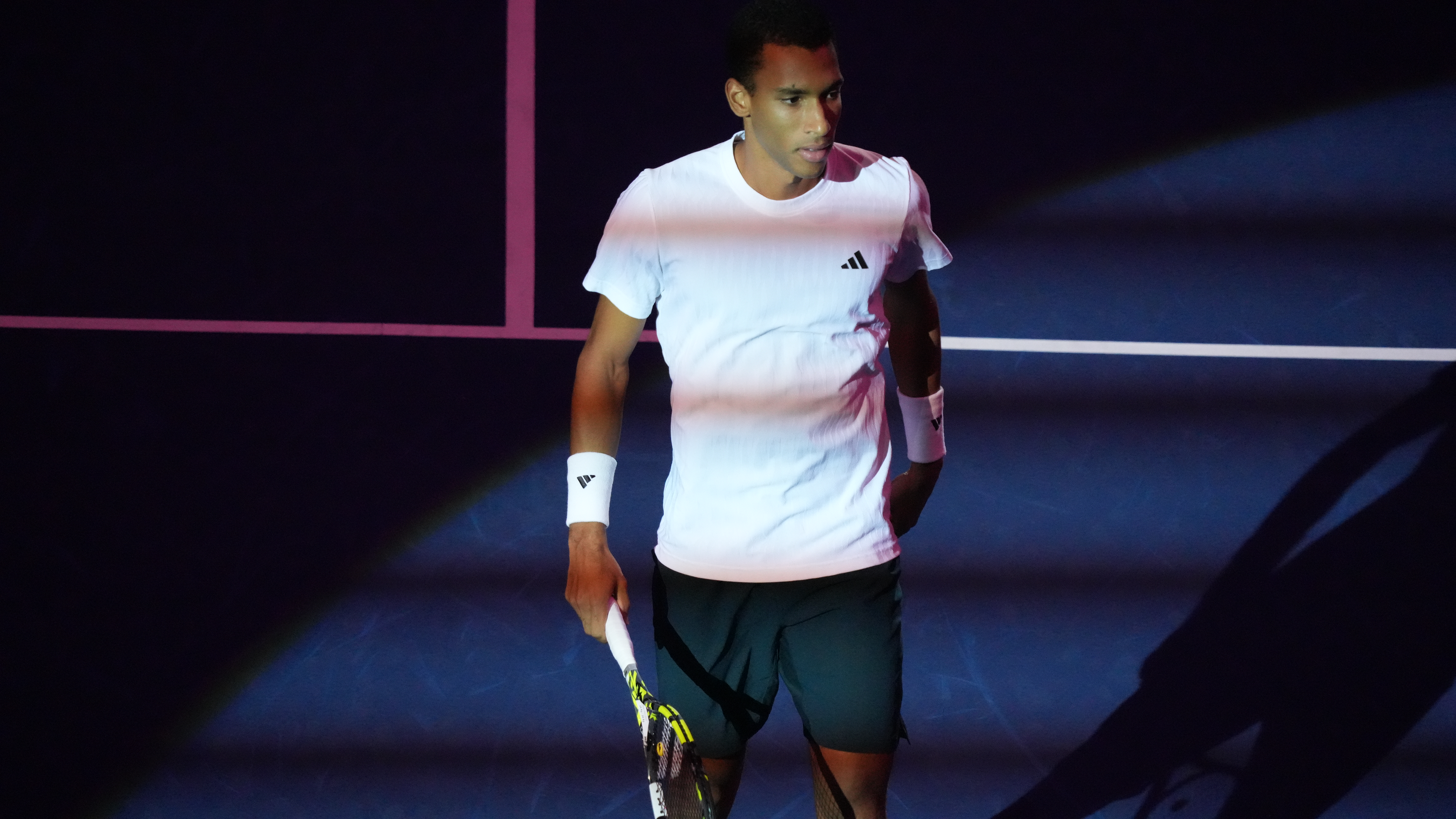
Félix Auger-Aliassime, Swiss Indoors Basel 2025.

At the US Open, Auger-Aliassime was seeded 25th. He defeated lucky loser Billy Harris and Roman Safiullin in straight sets, before upsetting world No. 3 Alexander Zverev in four sets in the third round. This was his first top-5 win at a Grand Slam tournament, having previously lost all six matches at majors against top-5 players. In the fourth round, Auger-Aliassime upset 15th seed Andrey Rublev in straight sets, advancing to his first Grand Slam quarterfinal since 2022 and his fourth overall. He then defeated world No. 8 Alex de Minaur in four sets to return to his first semifinal since 2021. At the 2025 Rolex Shanghai Masters Auger-Aliassime recorded his 250th win, en route to the quarterfinals, becoming only the third man born in the 2000s to reach the milestone, after Jannik Sinner and Carlos Alcaraz. At the start of the indoor hardcourt season, Auger-Aliassime defeated qualifier Eliot Spizzirri, Raphaël Collignon and Jiří Lehečka in three sets to win his second title at the BNP Paribas Fortis European Open and third of the year.

At the Rolex Paris Masters, he reached his first Masters 1000 final since Madrid last year, but lost to Jannik Sinner in straight sets.

At the ATP Finals, Auger-Aliassime was drawn against Sinner, Zverev and Ben Shelton in the round-robin stage group. He lost to Sinner once again, but beat Zverev and Shelton to qualify for the semifinals going 2–1 and placing second in his group. He lost in the semifinals to Carlos Alcaraz.

Auger-Aliassime finished the year at a career-best No. 5, becoming the second ever Canadian in the history of the PIF ATP Rankings to be ranked inside the Top 5 (after Milos Raonic).

=== 2026: Major quarterfinal set, out of top 15 ===
Auger-Aliassime represented Canada at the 2026 United Cup, teaming with Victoria Mboko. They defeated China, 3–0, but lost to Belgium, 0–3, and did not advance out of the group stage.

At the 2026 Australian Open, Auger-Aliassime was seeded seventh, but retired in his first-round match against Portugal’s Nuno Borges due to leg cramps early in the fourth set.

In February, Auger-Alissime successfully defended his title in Montpellier, defeating home favourite Adrian Mannarino in the final. He defeated Stan Wawrinka and Arthur Fils en route to the final. The win is Auger-Alissime's ninth ATP title, and his eighth on indoor hardcourts. Nine titles was the most for a Canadian man in the Open Era one more than Milos Raonic. Also, Auger-Aliassime's 89 ATP indoor matches was the most of any player this decade, ahead of Jannik Sinner's 83.

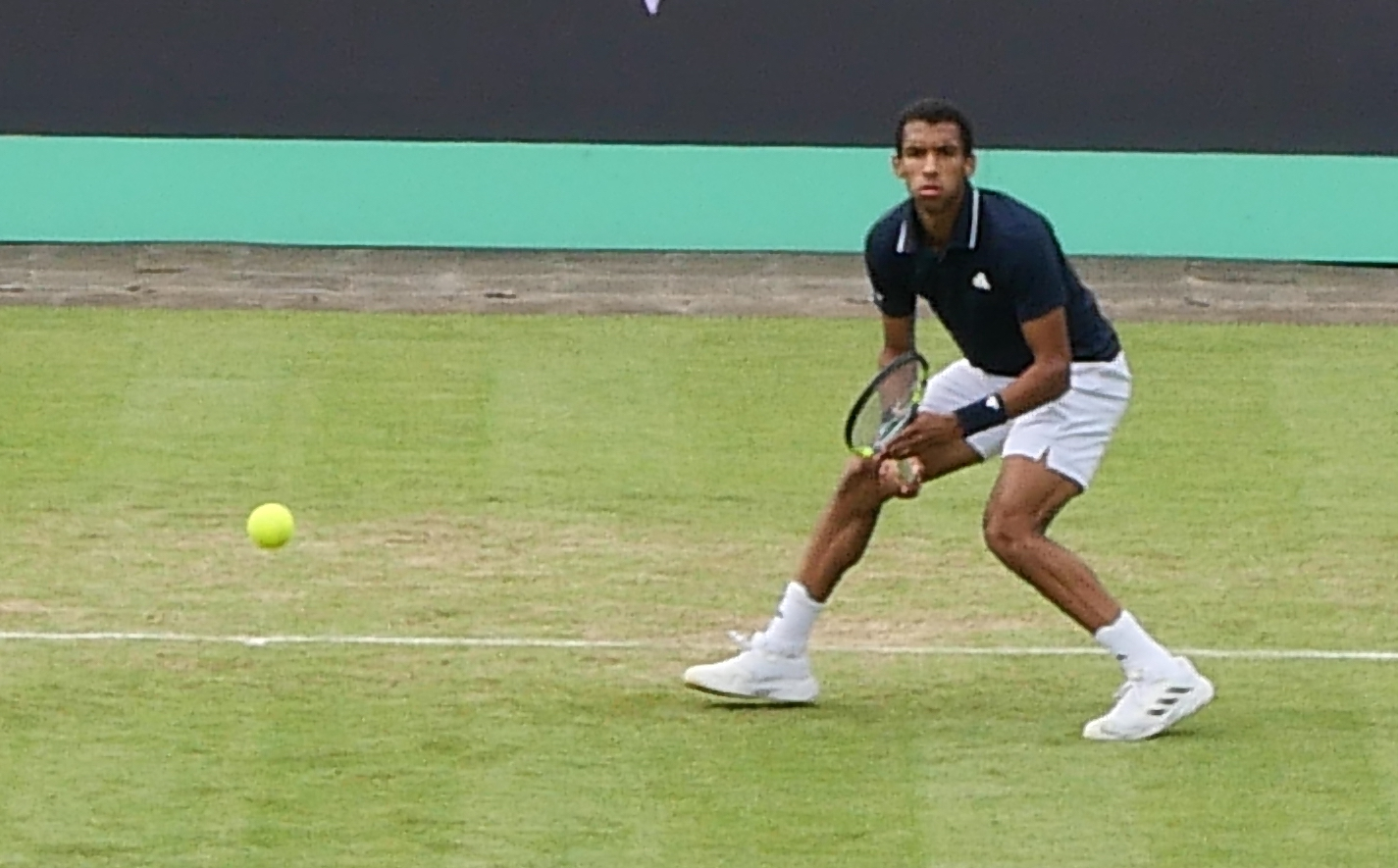
Auger-Aliassime at the 2026 Libéma Open

At the 2026 Monte-Carlo Masters, Auger-Aliassime became the third player born in the 2000s to reach at least the quarterfinals at all nine ATP Masters 1000 events (after Alcaraz and Sinner), and became the first Canadian player to do so.

Auger-Aliassime reached the French Open quarterfinals at the 2026 French Open, becoming the first Canadian to reach at least the quarterfinals of all 4 Grand Slams. As a result he moved up to a new career-best ranking of world No. 4. He lost to 10th seed Flavio Cobolli in four sets. Auger-Aliassime lost to Novak Djokovic in the longest QF match ever played at Wimbledon, a 5-set thriller that lasted over 5 hours.

After the Wimbledon loss, Auger-Aliassime announced he was parting ways with his long-time coach, Frédéric Fontang, who he worked with for 10 years. Fontang had coached Auger-Aliassime since he was 16 years old, and the player expressed his "deepest respect, gratitude and admiration for... helping me achieve my goals," and wished Fontang "nothing but the very best" going forward.

== Playing style ==
Auger-Aliassime is an all-court tennis player. His favorite shot is the forehand, and his favorite tournament is the Rogers Cup, because it is played in his hometown of Montreal. His most successful surface is indoor hardcourt, having won eight of his nine titles on it. Auger-Aliassime also possesses a strong serve and moves well around the court. He is able to generate power easily off both wings, but is sometimes prone to unforced errors. Additionally, he plays with high intensity at each point, which can wear down his opponents during long matches.

== Other ventures ==
Auger-Aliassime appears in the tennis docuseries Break Point, which premiered on Netflix on January 13, 2023. Since then, rumours of a "Netflix Curse" involving the tournament results of the players featured in the docuseries have been spread across social media platforms.

He partnered with BNP Paribas in 2020 to create #FAAPointsForChange, a program that benefits children in the Kara region of Togo, his father's native land. In 2023, Auger-Aliassime was named the Arthur Ashe Humanitarian Award Winner by the ATP for that work. He chose to continue that work during November 2024, forgoing being part of Team Canada for the 2024 Davis Cup final, and was replaced by Milos Raonic. At the beginning of 2025, in further collaboration with BNP Paribas, the program was enhanced to provide excellence scholarships to deserving Togolese university students from disadvantaged rural backgrounds, supporting their academic journey at the University of Lomé.

== Personal life ==
Since late 2019, Auger-Aliassime has been in a relationship with model and equestrian Nina Ghaibi, cousin of Ajla Tomljanovic, whom he married on September 24, 2025, in Marrakesh, Morocco.

== Career statistics ==
=== Grand Slam performance timeline ===
Key
W	F	SF	QF	#R	RR	Q#	P#	DNQ	A	Z#	PO	G	S	B	NMS	NTI	P	NH

(W) winner; (F) finalist; (SF) semifinalist; (QF) quarterfinalist; (#R) rounds 4, 3, 2, 1; (RR) round-robin stage; (Q#) qualification round; (P#) preliminary round; (DNQ) did not qualify; (A) absent; (Z#) Davis/Fed Cup Zonal Group (with number indication) or (PO) play-off; (G) gold, (S) silver or (B) bronze Olympic/Paralympic medal; (NMS) not a Masters tournament; (NTI) not a Tier I tournament; (P) postponed; (NH) not held; (SR) strike rate (events won / competed); (W–L) win–loss record.
To avoid confusion and double counting, these charts are updated at the conclusion of a tournament or when the player's participation has ended.

Current through the 2026 US Open.

Tournament	2016	2017	2018	2019	2020	2021	2022	2023	2024	2025	2026	SR	W–L	Win%
Grand Slam tournaments
Australian Open	A	A	A	Q2	1R	4R	QF	4R	3R	2R	1R	0 / 7	13–7	68%
French Open	A	A	Q2	A	1R	1R	4R	1R	4R	1R	QF	0 / 7	10–7	59%
Wimbledon	A	A	A	3R	NH	QF	1R	1R	1R	2R	QF	0 / 7	11–7	61%
US Open	A	Q2	1R	1R	4R	SF	2R	1R	1R	SF	2R	0 / 9	15–9	63%
Win–loss	0–0	0–0	0–1	2–2	3–3	12–4	8–4	3–4	5–4	7–4	9–4	0 / 30	49–30	62%

=== ATP Masters 1000 finals ===
==== Singles: 2 (2 runner-ups) ====
Result	Year	Tournament	Surface	Opponent	Score
Loss	2024	Madrid Open	Clay	Andrey Rublev	6–4, 5–7, 5–7
Loss	2025	Paris Masters	Hard (i)	(Italy) Jannik Sinner	4–6, 6–7^{(4–7)}

==== Doubles: 1 (1 title) ====
Result	Year	Tournament	Surface	Partner	Opponents	Score
Win	2020	Paris Masters	Hard (i)	(Poland) Hubert Hurkacz	(Croatia) Mate Pavić (Brazil) Bruno Soares	6–7^{(3–7)}, 7–6^{(9–7)}, [10–2]

=== Summer Olympics ===
==== Singles: 1 (fourth place) ====
Result	Year	Tournament	Surface	Opponent	Score
4th place	2024	Paris Olympics	Clay	(Italy) Lorenzo Musetti	4–6, 6–1, 3–6

==== Mixed doubles: 1 (bronze medal) ====
Result	Year	Tournament	Surface	Partner	Opponents	Score
Bronze	2024	Paris Olympics	Clay	(Canada) Gabriela Dabrowski	(Netherlands) Demi Schuurs (Netherlands) Wesley Koolhof	6–3, 7–6^{(7–2)}

=== Records ===
Time span	Record accomplished	Players matched
Significant records
2022	Winner of the two premier team competitions (ATP Cup & Davis Cup) in a calendar year	Daniil Medvedev; Andrey Rublev
2022	Winner of all three ATP/ITF team events (ATP Cup, Laver Cup & Davis Cup) in a single season	Daniil Medvedev; Andrey Rublev
2026	First Canadian player to complete the set of Grand Slam quarterfinals	Stands alone
2026	Longest quarterfinals by duration (5h:15m)	Novak Djokovic

Awards
Preceded by (United Kingdom) Andy Murray	Arthur Ashe Humanitarian of the Year; 2023	Succeeded by (Austria) Dominic Thiem
