= Elliot Benchetrit =

Moroccan tennis player (born 1998)

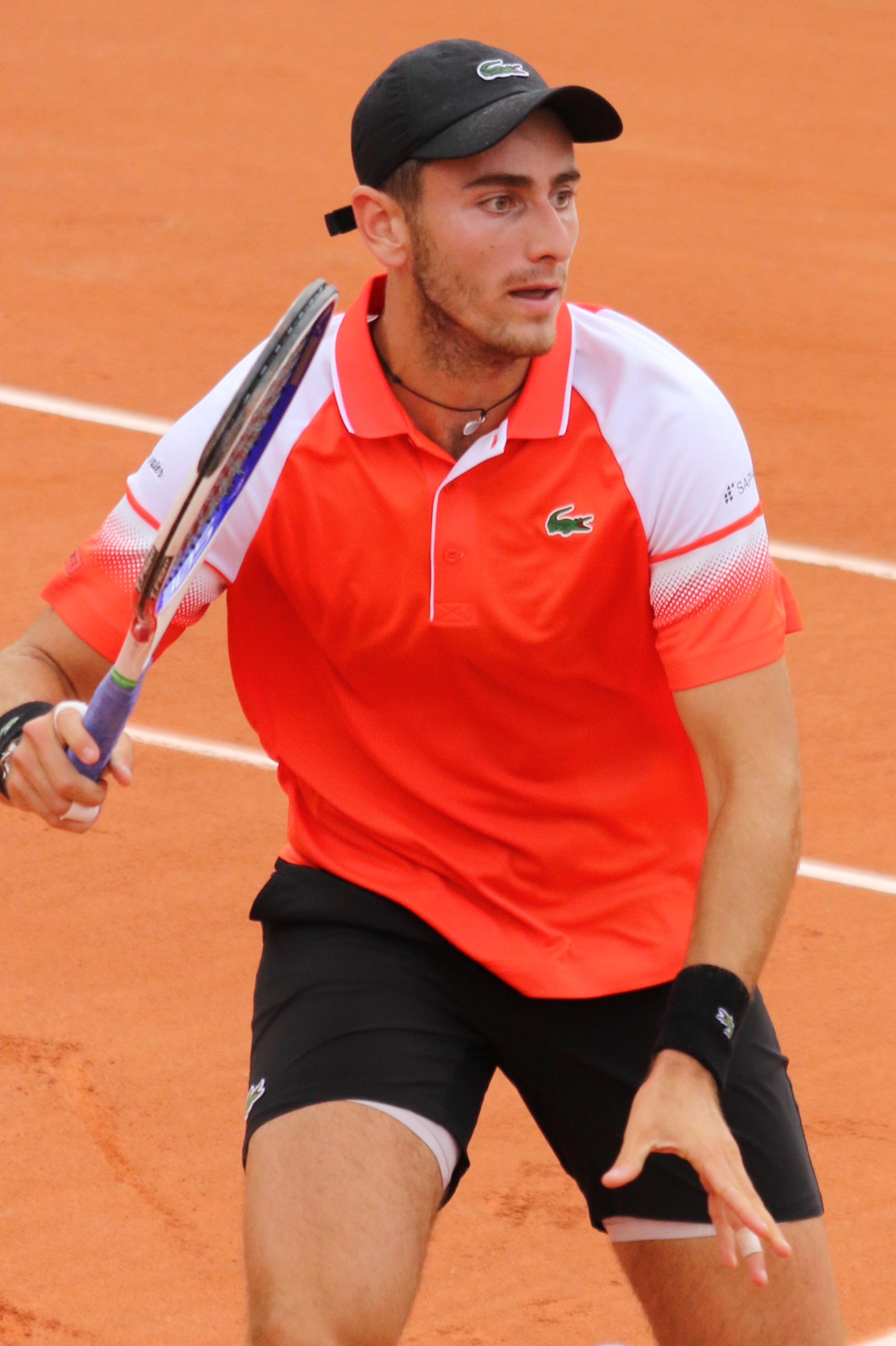
- Benchetrit at the 2019 French Open
- Country (sports): Morocco (2021–2025); France (−2020)
- Residence: Morocco
- Born: 2 October 1998 (age 27) Nice, France
- Height: 1.93 m (6 ft 4 in)
- Turned pro: 2016
- Retired: 30 November 2025
- Plays: Right-handed (two-handed backhand)
- Coach: Aurelien Richaud, Jean-Michel Pequery
- Prize money: $598,020

Singles
- Career record: 5–12 (at ATP Tour level, Grand Slam level, and in Davis Cup)
- Career titles: 0
- Highest ranking: No. 198 (10 February 2020)

Grand Slam singles results
- Australian Open: 1R (2020)
- French Open: 2R (2019)
- US Open: 1R (2019)

Doubles
- Career record: 1–4 (at ATP Tour level, Grand Slam level, and in Davis Cup)
- Career titles: 0
- Highest ranking: No. 198 (10 June 2019)

Grand Slam doubles results
- French Open: 2R (2019)
Medal record
Mediterranean Games
Bronze medal – third place	2022 Oran	Men's Doubles

Elliot Benchetrit (born 2 October 1998) is a Moroccan former tennis player who represented Morocco since 1 January 2021, having previously represented France. His highest singles ranking was No. 198 on 10 February 2020, and his highest doubles ranking was No. 198 on 10 June 2019.

He has won three singles titles on the ITF Men's Circuit, and two doubles titles, as well as another doubles title on the ATP Challenger Tour.

== Tennis career ==
He won his first ITF singles tournament in 2017 in Tunisia, and his first ITF doubles tournament the same year in Morocco, with Maxime Hamou.

Benchetrit made his Grand Slam main-draw debut at the 2018 French Open, after receiving a wildcard to the singles main draw. He was defeated by fellow Frenchman Gaël Monfils in four sets in the first round. The following year at the 2019 French Open he also received wildcards in both singles and doubles and won his first round matches in both events.

=== Banana incident at the 2020 Australian Open ===
On 19 January 2020, while competing in the qualifiers for the 2020 Australian Open, 21-year-old Benchetrit asked a teenage ball girl to get him a banana. Upon being handed the banana, Benchetrit told the ball girl “I can't do it,” indicating that he himself was unable to peel the banana due to his fingers being "heavily taped" due to blisters (or "heavily bandaged" as some outlets reported), and him having put cream on his hands in order not to sweat, and requested that she peel it for him. The chair umpire intervened, ordering Benchetrit to peel the banana himself, and, according to Benchetrit, telling him that the ball girl "was not his slave." Benchetrit went on to defeat his opponent and qualify for the main tournament, where he lost in the first round. The incident triggered debate on social media and within the ranks of tennis about the role of ball girls and ball boys. Benchetrit later expressed his disbelief at the umpire's statement to him, and the social media response "without people knowing what really happened".

Benchetrit retired from professional tennis in November 2025.

== Personal life ==
He was born in Nice, France, and lives in Morocco.

Benchetrit is of Moroccan descent through his father. He is Jewish.

== ITF Circuit finals ==
=== Singles: 10 (6–4) ===
Legend
ATP Challenger (0–0)
ITF Futures (6–4)

Titles by surface
Hard (4–0)
Clay (2–4)
Grass (0–0)
Carpet (0–0)

Result	W–L	Date	Tournament	Tier	Surface	Opponent	Score
Loss	0–1	Jun 2017	Tunisia F21, Hammamet	Futures	Clay	(Colombia) Cristian Rodríguez	5–7, 4–6
Loss	0–2	Jul 2017	Morocco F2, Mohammedia	Futures	Clay	(Spain) Carlos Boluda-Purkiss	0–6, 4–6
Win	1–2	Sep 2017	Tunisia F25, Hammamet	Futures	Clay	(Germany) Rudolf Molleker	6–4, 2–0 Ret.
Win	2–2	Sep 2017	Tunisia F26, Hammamet	Futures	Clay	(Italy) Luca Giacomini	6–4, 6–2
Win	3–2	Feb 2018	Tunisia F6, Djerba	Futures	Hard	(France) Matteo Martineau	6–3, 6–2
Win	4–2	Sep 2022	M25, Sintra	ITF World Tennis Tour	Hard	(Netherlands) Jesper de Jong	6–4, 6–1
Win	5–2	Jan 2023	M25, Doha	ITF World Tennis Tour	Hard	Bogdan Bobrov	6–4, 6–3
Loss	5–3	May 2023	M15, Kuršumlijska Banja	ITF World Tennis Tour	Clay	(Germany) Marko Topo	3–6, 4–6
Win	6–3	Oct 2023	M15, Monastir	ITF World Tennis Tour	Hard	(Poland) Olaf Pieczkowski	6–2, 6–3
Loss	6–4	May 2024	M15, Bucharest	ITF World Tennis Tour	Clay	(Bulgaria) Petr Nesterov	1–6, 2–6

=== Doubles: 5 (3–2) ===
Legend
ATP Challenger (1–1)
ITF Futures (2–1)

Outcome	No.	Date	Tournament	Surface	Partner	Opponents	Score
Winner	1.	5 August 2017	Casablanca, Morocco F3	Clay	(France) Maxime Hamou	(United States) Nick Chappell (Tunisia) Skander Mansouri	7–6^{(7–4)}, 6–7^{(2–7)}, [10–5]
Winner	2.	10 September 2017	Hammamet, Tunisia F25	Clay	(Germany) Rudolf Molleker	(Tunisia) Aziz Dougaz (Tunisia) Anis Ghorbel	7–5, 6–3
Runner-up	1.	17 September 2017	Hammamet, Tunisia F26	Clay	(Germany) Louis Wessels	(Italy) Filippo Baldi (Italy) Mirko Cutuli	4–6, 4–6
Winner	3.	17 June 2018	Lyon, France	Clay	(France) Geoffrey Blancaneaux	(Chinese Taipei) Hsieh Cheng-peng (Switzerland) Luca Margaroli	6–3, 4–6, [10–7]
Runner-up	2.	22 August 2020	Todi, Italy	Clay	(France) Hugo Gaston	(Uruguay) Ariel Behar (Kazakhstan) Andrey Golubev	4–6, 2–6
