= Open Sopra Steria de Lyon =

- 2025 Open Sopra Steria de Lyon

ATP Challenger Tour
- Location: Lyon, France
- Venue: Tennis Club de Lyon
- Category: Challenger 100
- Surface: Clay / Outdoors
- Draw: 32S/32Q/16D
- Prize money: €145,250 (2025), €64,000+H
- Website: Official website

The Open Sopra Steria de Lyon is a tennis tournament held in Lyon, France, since 2016. The event is part of the ATP Challenger Tour and is played on outdoor clay courts.

== Past finals ==
=== Singles ===
Year	Champion	Runner-up	Score
2026	(Spain) David Jordà Sanchis	(France) Felix Balshaw	6–4, 7–6^{(7–4)}
2025	(Argentina) Marco Trungelliti	(Spain) Daniel Mérida	6–3, 4–6, 6–3
2024	(France) Hugo Gaston	(France) Alexandre Müller	6–2, 1–6, 6–1
2023	(Brazil) Felipe Meligeni Alves	(Switzerland) Alexander Ritschard	6–4, 0–6, 7–6^{(9–7)}
2022	(France) Corentin Moutet	(Argentina) Pedro Cachin	6–4, 6–4
2021	(Uruguay) Pablo Cuevas	(Sweden) Elias Ymer	6–2, 6–2
2020	Not held		
2019	(France) Corentin Moutet	(Sweden) Elias Ymer	6–4, 6–4
2018	(Canada) Félix Auger-Aliassime	(France) Johan Tatlot	6–7^{(3–7)}, 7–5, 6–2
2017	(Canada) Félix Auger-Aliassime	(France) Mathias Bourgue	6–4, 6–1
2016	(Belgium) Steve Darcis	(Brazil) Thiago Monteiro	3–6, 6–2, 6–0

=== Doubles ===
Year	Champions	Runners-up	Score
2026	(Thailand) Pruchya Isaro (India) Niki Kaliyanda Poonacha	(Tunisia) Skander Mansouri (Austria) Maximilian Neuchrist	6–0, 6–1
2025	(Chinese Taipei) Hsu Yu-hsiou (Japan) Kaichi Uchida	(France) Luca Sanchez (Japan) Seita Watanabe	1–6, 6–3, [12–10]
2024	(France) Manuel Guinard (France) Grégoire Jacq	(Greece) Markos Kalovelonis (Ukraine) Vladyslav Orlov	4–6, 6–3, [10–6]
2023	(France) Manuel Guinard (France) Grégoire Jacq	(Germany) Constantin Frantzen (Germany) Hendrik Jebens	6–4, 2–6, [10–7]
2022	(Monaco) Romain Arneodo (France) Jonathan Eysseric	(Netherlands) Sander Arends (Netherlands) David Pel	7–5, 4–6, [10–4]
2021	(Uruguay) Martín Cuevas (Uruguay) Pablo Cuevas	(France) Tristan Lamasine (France) Albano Olivetti	6–3, 7–6^{(7–2)}
2020	Not held		
2019	(Austria) Philipp Oswald (Slovakia) Filip Polášek	(Italy) Simone Bolelli (Italy) Andrea Pellegrino	6–4, 7–6^{(7–2)}
2018	(France) Elliot Benchetrit (France) Geoffrey Blancaneaux	(Chinese Taipei) Hsieh Cheng-peng (Switzerland) Luca Margaroli	6–3, 4–6, [10–7]
2017	(Belgium) Sander Gillé (Belgium) Joran Vliegen	(Germany) Gero Kretschmer (Germany) Alexander Satschko	6–7^{(2–7)}, 7–6^{(7–2)}, [14–12]
2016	(France) Grégoire Barrère (France) Tristan Lamasine	(France) Jonathan Eysseric (Croatia) Franko Škugor	2–6, 6–3, [10–6]
