= 2017 Las Vegas Challenger – Singles =

Singles
- 2017 Las Vegas Challenger

Final
- Champion: (United States) Stefan Kozlov
- Runner-up: (United Kingdom) Liam Broady
- Score: 3–6, 7–5, 6–4

Events
Singles	Doubles
← 2016 ·	Las Vegas Challenger	· 2018 →

Sam Groth was the defending champion but retired in the second round against Jan Choinski.

Stefan Kozlov won the title after defeating Liam Broady 3–6, 7–5, 6–4 in the final.

== Seeds ==
1. (United States) Tennys Sandgren (semifinals)
2. (United Kingdom) Cameron Norrie (second round)
3. (United States) Bjorn Fratangelo (first round)
4. (United States) Stefan Kozlov (champion)
5. (Serbia) Nikola Milojević (first round)
6. (United States) Michael Mmoh (second round)
7. (Australia) Sam Groth (second round, retired)
8. (United States) Reilly Opelka (quarterfinals)

== Draw ==
=== Key ===
- Q = Qualifier
- WC = Wild card
- LL = Lucky loser
- Alt = Alternate
- ITF = ITF entry
- PR = Protected ranking
- SR = Special ranking
- SE = Special exempt
- JE = Junior exempt
- JR = Junior Accelerator Programme entrant
- CO = College Accelerator Programme entrant
- NG = Next Gen Accelerator Program entrant
- w/o = Walkover
- r = Retired
- d = Defaulted

=== Finals ===
Semifinals
1	(United States) Tennys Sandgren	3	6^{6}
4	(United States) Stefan Kozlov	6	7^{8}
(United States) Evan King	4	5
(United Kingdom) Liam Broady	6	7

Final
4	(United States) Stefan Kozlov	3	7	6
(United Kingdom) Liam Broady	6	5	4

=== Top half ===
First round
1	(United States) T Sandgren	6	6
Q	(Zimbabwe) B Lock	2	4
(Austria) L Miedler	7^{13}	4	7
Q	(Brazil) K Sell	6^{11}	6	5
WC	(Moldova) A Cozbinov	6	4	4
Q	(Germany) J Choinski	4	6	6
WC	(Denmark) M Torpegaard	3	4
7	(Australia) S Groth	6	6
4	(United States) S Kozlov	7	6
WC	(United States) JC Aragone	5	3
(United States) A Sarkissian	6	3	2
(Germany) D Köpfer	2	6	6
(United States) K King	6	6
WC	(South Africa) Ruben Alberts	2	3
(United States) M Giron	6	7^{7}
5	(Serbia) N Milojević	4	6^{1}

Second round
1	(United States) T Sandgren	7	6
(Austria) L Miedler	5	4
Q	(Germany) J Choinski	2
7	(Australia) S Groth	1^{r}
4	(United States) S Kozlov	6	6
(Germany) D Köpfer	4	1
(United States) K King	4	6	6
(United States) M Giron	6	3	4

Quarterfinals
1	(United States) T Sandgren	6	6
Q	(Germany) J Choinski	1	0
4	(United States) S Kozlov	6	6
(United States) K King	2	3

Semifinals
1	(United States) T Sandgren	3	6^{6}
4	(United States) S Kozlov	6	7^{8}

=== Bottom half ===
First round
6	(United States) M Mmoh	6	6
(Czech Republic) J Šátral	4	1
PR	(United States) B Klahn	3	7	6
SE	(Australia) C O'Connell	6	5	3
(United States) E King	6^{4}	7^{7}	6
(United States) D Novikov	7^{7}	6^{4}	4
(United Kingdom) B Klein	7^{7}	6
3	(United States) B Fratangelo	6^{2}	4
8	(United States) R Opelka	7^{7}	6
(United Kingdom) J Clarke	6^{2}	4
LL	(Zimbabwe) T Garanganga	2	2
Q	(United States) Jared Hiltzik	6	6
(United Kingdom) L Broady	7^{7}	6
LL	(United States) A Rybakov	6^{5}	3
(Spain) R Ortega Olmedo	4	3
2	(United Kingdom) C Norrie	6	6

Second round
6	(United States) M Mmoh	3	6	3
PR	(United States) B Klahn	6	3	6
(United States) E King	6^{2}	6	7
(United Kingdom) B Klein	7^{7}	3	5
8	(United States) R Opelka	7^{7}	6
Q	(United States) J Hiltzik	6^{5}	4
(United Kingdom) L Broady	7^{7}	6
2	(United Kingdom) C Norrie	6^{5}	4

Quarterfinals
PR	(United States) B Klahn	6^{7}	6^{6}
(United States) E King	7^{9}	7^{8}
8	(United States) R Opelka	7^{7}	6^{5}	4
(United Kingdom) L Broady	6^{2}	7^{7}	6

Semifinals
(United States) E King	4	5
(United Kingdom) L Broady	6	7
