= 2017 Las Vegas Challenger – Doubles =

Doubles
- 2017 Las Vegas Challenger

Final
- Champions: (United Kingdom) Brydan Klein (United Kingdom) Joe Salisbury
- Runners-up: (Mexico) Hans Hach Verdugo (United States) Dennis Novikov
- Score: 6–3, 4–6, [10–3]

Events
| Singles | men | women |
| Doubles | men | women |
| ← 2016 · | Las Vegas Challenger | · 2018 → |

Brian Baker and Matt Reid were the defending champions but chose not to defend their title.

Brydan Klein and Joe Salisbury won the title after defeating Hans Hach Verdugo and Dennis Novikov 6–3, 4–6, [10–3] in the final.

== Seeds ==
1. (United Kingdom) Brydan Klein / (United Kingdom) Joe Salisbury (champions)
2. (Australia) Jarryd Chaplin / (Latvia) Miķelis Lībietis (semifinals)
3. (Mexico) Hans Hach Verdugo / (United States) Dennis Novikov (final)
4. (United States) Bradley Klahn / (United States) Mackenzie McDonald (first round, withdrew)

== Draw ==
=== Key ===
- Q = Qualifier
- WC = Wild card
- LL = Lucky loser
- Alt = Alternate
- SE = Special exempt
- PR = Protected ranking
- ITF = ITF entry
- JE = Junior exempt
- w/o = Walkover
- r = Retired
- d = Defaulted
- SR = Special ranking

First round
(United Kingdom) C Norrie (United States) A Rybakov | 4 | 4
(United States) Boris Kozlov (United States) S Kozlov | 6 | 6
4 | (United States) B Klahn (United States) M McDonald
WC | (Zimbabwe) B Lock (Zimbabwe) CJ Lock | w/o
(Serbia) N Milojević (Czech Republic) J Šátral
(United States) K King (South Africa) R Roelofse | w/o
(United Kingdom) J Clarke (United Kingdom) M Willis | 6 | 7^{9}
(Venezuela) LD Martínez (Spain) R Ortega Olmedo | 3 | 6^{7}
WC | (United States) Cameron Lickle (United States) V Spadea | 3 | 4
3 | (Mexico) H Hach Verdugo (United States) D Novikov | 6 | 6
(United Kingdom) L Broady (Denmark) F Nielsen | 6 | 4 | [8]
WC | (United States) Trevor Allen Johnson (United States) Patrick Kawka | 4 | 6 | [10]
(Australia) M Barton (Australia) G Jones | 6^{5} | 2
2 | (Australia) Jarryd Chaplin (Latvia) M Lībietis | 7^{7} | 6

Quarterfinals
1 | (United Kingdom) B Klein (United Kingdom) J Salisbury | 7^{7} | 4 | [10]
(United States) B Kozlov (United States) S Kozlov | 6^{0} | 6 | [3]
WC | (Zimbabwe) B Lock (Zimbabwe) CJ Lock | 3 | 5
(United States) K King (South Africa) R Roelofse | 6 | 7
(United Kingdom) J Clarke (United Kingdom) M Willis
3 | (Mexico) H Hach Verdugo (United States) D Novikov | w/o
WC | (United States) TA Johnson (United States) P Kawka | 4 | 1
2 | (Australia) J Chaplin (Latvia) M Lībietis | 6 | 6

Semifinals
1 | (United Kingdom) B Klein (United Kingdom) J Salisbury | 7^{8} | 6
(United States) K King (South Africa) R Roelofse | 6^{6} | 3
3 | (Mexico) H Hach Verdugo (United States) D Novikov | 6 | 4 | [10]
2 | (Australia) J Chaplin (Latvia) M Lībietis | 3 | 6 | [3]

Final
1 | (United Kingdom) B Klein (United Kingdom) J Salisbury | 6 | 4 | [10]
3 | (Mexico) H Hach Verdugo (United States) D Novikov | 3 | 6 | [3]
