= 2018 Las Vegas Challenger – Singles =

Singles
- 2018 Las Vegas Challenger

Final
- Champion: (Australia) Thanasi Kokkinakis
- Runner-up: (Slovenia) Blaž Rola
- Score: 6–4, 6–4

Events
Singles	Doubles
← 2017 ·	Las Vegas Challenger	· 2019 →

Stefan Kozlov was the defending champion but lost in the first round to Kamil Majchrzak.

Thanasi Kokkinakis won the title after defeating Blaž Rola 6–4, 6–4 in the final.

== Seeds ==
1. (South Africa) Lloyd Harris (second round)
2. (Spain) Adrián Menéndez Maceiras (second round)
3. (Norway) Casper Ruud (semifinals)
4. (Chinese Taipei) Jason Jung (quarterfinals)
5. (United States) Noah Rubin (first round)
6. (United States) Reilly Opelka (withdrew)
7. (Germany) Dominik Köpfer (first round)
8. (El Salvador) Marcelo Arévalo (second round)

== Draw ==
Key

- Q = Qualifier
- WC = Wild card
- LL = Lucky loser
- Alt = Alternate
- ITF = ITF entry
- PR = Protected ranking
- SR = Special ranking
- SE = Special exempt
- JE = Junior exempt
- JR = Junior Accelerator Programme entrant
- CO = College Accelerator Programme entrant
- NG = Next Gen Accelerator Program entrant
- w/o = Walkover
- r = Retired
- d = Defaulted

=== Finals ===
Semifinals
(Australia) Thanasi Kokkinakis	6	6
3	(Norway) Casper Ruud	4	1
(Australia) John-Patrick Smith	3	5
(Slovenia) Blaž Rola	6	7

Final
(Australia) Thanasi Kokkinakis	6	6
(Slovenia) Blaž Rola	4	4

=== Top half ===
First round
1	(South Africa) L Harris	6	6
(United Kingdom) J Ward	4	4
(Australia) T Kokkinakis	7^{7}	6
WC	(Moldova) A Cozbinov	6^{5}	1
Q	(United States) T Paul	6	7^{7}
(United States) K King	1	6^{2}
(Barbados) D King	6	6
7	(Germany) D Köpfer	4	4
3	(Norway) C Ruud	6	3	6
(United States) M Krueger	3	6	3
LL	(United States) E King	6	6
(Spain) T Robredo	3	4
(Poland) K Majchrzak	6	6
(United States) S Kozlov	0	2
(United States) JC Aragone	2	6	6^{3}
8	(El Salvador) M Arévalo	6	4	7^{7}

Second round
1	(South Africa) L Harris	4	3
(Australia) T Kokkinakis	6	6
Q	(United States) T Paul	4	4
(Barbados) D King	6	6
3	(Norway) C Ruud	6	6
LL	(United States) E King	3	2
(Poland) K Majchrzak	2	6	6
8	(El Salvador) M Arévalo	6	1	4

Quarterfinals
(Australia) T Kokkinakis	6	6
(Barbados) D King	1	4
3	(Norway) C Ruud	7	7
(Poland) K Majchrzak	5	5

Semifinals
(Australia) T Kokkinakis	6	6
3	(Norway) C Ruud	4	1

=== Bottom half ===
First round
LL	(Netherlands) J Sels	7^{7}	5	4
(Australia) J-P Smith	6^{4}	7	6
WC	(Denmark) M Torpegaard	4	6	6^{6}
(Turkey) C İlkel	6	3	7^{8}
Alt	(Germany) J Choinski	3	4
Q	(Spain) R Ortega Olmedo	6	6
LL	(United States) A Sarkissian	6^{5}	4
4	(Chinese Taipei) J Jung	7^{7}	6
5	(United States) N Rubin	3	6	3
(Slovenia) B Rola	6	1	6
Q	(United States) T-S Kwiatkowski	6	6
WC	(United States) Evan Song	4	4
(Croatia) N Serdarušić	6^{4}	4
Q	(France) M Bourgue	7^{7}	6
WC	(United States) J. J. Wolf	3	3
2	(Spain) A Menéndez Maceiras	6	6

Second round
(Australia) J-P Smith	6	6
(Turkey) C İlkel	3	1
Q	(Spain) R Ortega Olmedo	4	4
4	(Chinese Taipei) J Jung	6	6
(Slovenia) B Rola	6	6
Q	(United States) T-S Kwiatkowski	3	4
Q	(France) M Bourgue	6	0	6
2	(Spain) A Menéndez Maceiras	4	6	3

Quarterfinals
(Australia) J-P Smith	7^{7}	6
4	(Chinese Taipei) J Jung	6^{3}	3
(Slovenia) B Rola	6	7^{7}
Q	(France) M Bourgue	4	6^{1}

Semifinals
(Australia) J-P Smith	3	5
(Slovenia) B Rola	6	7
