= 2022 Las Vegas Challenger – Doubles =

Doubles
- 2022 Las Vegas Challenger

Final
- Champions: (United Kingdom) Julian Cash (United Kingdom) Henry Patten
- Runners-up: (Germany) Constantin Frantzen (United States) Reese Stalder
- Score: 6–4, 7–6^{(7–1)}

Events
Singles	Doubles
← 2021 ·	Las Vegas Challenger	· 2024 →

William Blumberg and Max Schnur were the defending champions but only Blumberg chose to defend his title, partnering Ben Shelton. Blumberg lost in the semifinals to Constantin Frantzen and Reese Stalder.

Julian Cash and Henry Patten won the title after defeating Frantzen and Stalder 6–4, 7–6^{(7–1)} in the final.

== Seeds ==
1. (Sweden) André Göransson / (Japan) Ben McLachlan (semifinals)
2. (United States) Robert Galloway / (Mexico) Hans Hach Verdugo (quarterfinals)
3. (United Kingdom) Julian Cash / (United Kingdom) Henry Patten (champions)
4. (United States) Alex Lawson / (New Zealand) Artem Sitak (quarterfinals)

== Draw ==
=== Key ===
- Q = Qualifier
- WC = Wild card
- LL = Lucky loser
- Alt = Alternate
- SE = Special exempt
- PR = Protected ranking
- ITF = ITF entry
- JE = Junior exempt
- w/o = Walkover
- r = Retired
- d = Defaulted
- SR = Special ranking

First round
1	(Sweden) A Göransson (Japan) B McLachlan	6	6
(Argentina) JP Ficovich (Argentina) F Mena	1	4
(Colombia) N Mejía (Greece) M Pervolarakis	7	6
(United States) B Holt (United States) Z Svajda	5	1
3	(United Kingdom) J Cash (United Kingdom) H Patten	7^{7}	6^{7}	[10]
(Australia) A Harris (United States) E King	6^{4}	7^{9}	[6]
(Zimbabwe) B Lock (Zimbabwe) CJ Lock	3	5
(Moldova) A Cozbinov (United States) S Kozlov	6	7
(Germany) C Frantzen (United States) R Stalder	6	6
(United States) Ezekiel Clark (United States) A Kovacevic	4	4
WC	(United States) Jack Atherton (United States) Thomas Navarro	2	4
4	(United States) A Lawson (New Zealand) A Sitak	6	6
(United States) W Blumberg (United States) B Shelton	6	7^{8}
WC	(United States) Jack Vance (United States) Tennyson Whiting	3	6^{6}
(India) A Chandrasekar (India) VS Prashanth	2	6	[3]
2	(United States) R Galloway (Mexico) H Hach Verdugo	6	4	[10]

Quarterfinals
1	(Sweden) A Göransson (Japan) B McLachlan	4	6	[10]
(Colombia) N Mejía (Greece) M Pervolarakis	6	0	[6]
3	(United Kingdom) J Cash (United Kingdom) H Patten	w/o
(Moldova) A Cozbinov (United States) S Kozlov
(Germany) C Frantzen (United States) R Stalder	6	7
4	(United States) A Lawson (New Zealand) A Sitak	4	5
(United States) W Blumberg (United States) B Shelton	6	6^{3}	[10]
2	(United States) R Galloway (Mexico) H Hach Verdugo	4	7^{7}	[8]

Semifinals
1	(Sweden) A Göransson (Japan) B McLachlan	6^{5}	1
3	(United Kingdom) J Cash (United Kingdom) H Patten	7^{7}	6
(Germany) C Frantzen (United States) R Stalder	6	7^{7}
(United States) W Blumberg (United States) B Shelton	1	6^{4}

Final
3	(United Kingdom) J Cash (United Kingdom) H Patten	6	7^{7}
(Germany) C Frantzen (United States) R Stalder	4	6^{1}
