= 2025 Las Vegas Challenger – Singles =

Singles
- 2025 Las Vegas Challenger

Final
- Champion: (Jordan) Abdullah Shelbayh
- Runner-up: (United States) Alex Rybakov
- Score: 6–2, 6–4

Events
Singles	Doubles
← 2024 ·	Las Vegas Challenger	· 2026 →

Learner Tien was the defending champion but chose not to defend his title.

Abdullah Shelbayh won the title after defeating Alex Rybakov 6–2, 6–4 in the final.

== Seeds ==
1. (Austria) Jurij Rodionov (quarterfinals)
2. (United Kingdom) Jack Pinnington Jones (first round)
3. (Japan) James Trotter (second round)
4. (Lebanon) Benjamin Hassan (semifinals)
5. (Colombia) Nicolás Mejía (second round)
6. (Kazakhstan) Dmitry Popko (second round)
7. (United States) Mitchell Krueger (first round)
8. (United Kingdom) Johannus Monday (first round)

== Draw ==
Key

- Q = Qualifier
- WC = Wild card
- LL = Lucky loser
- Alt = Alternate
- ITF = ITF entry
- PR = Protected ranking
- SR = Special ranking
- SE = Special exempt
- JE = Junior exempt
- JR = Junior Accelerator Programme entrant
- CO = College Accelerator Programme entrant
- NG = Next Gen Accelerator Program entrant
- w/o = Walkover
- r = Retired
- d = Defaulted

=== Finals ===
Semifinals
(Jordan) Abdullah Shelbayh	6	6
4	(Lebanon) Benjamin Hassan	3	1
(United States) Alex Rybakov	7^{7}	6
(United States) Andre Ilagan	6^{4}	3

Final
(Jordan) Abdullah Shelbayh	6	6
(United States) Alex Rybakov	2	4

=== Top half ===
First round
1	(Austria) J Rodionov	4	7^{7}	6
WC	(United States) G Johns	6	6^{4}	4
(Germany) M Rosenkranz	6^{4}	1
WC	(United States) C Williams	7^{7}	6
(Jordan) A Shelbayh	6	6
(United States) A Perez	3	4
(United States) T Zink	6	3	5
5	(Colombia) N Mejía	4	6	7
4	(Lebanon) B Hassan	7^{7}	2	6
Q	(Australia) E Winter	6^{4}	6	3
Q	(Germany) D Masur	4	3
(United States) A Martin	6	6
PR	(Jamaica) B Bicknell	6	6
(United States) Patrick Maloney	2	4
Q	(United States) A Fenty	7^{7}	6
8	(United Kingdom) J Monday	6^{4}	4

Second round
1	(Austria) J Rodionov	6	6
WC	(United States) C Williams	4	3
(Jordan) A Shelbayh	7	6
5	(Colombia) N Mejía	5	1
4	(Lebanon) B Hassan	6^{1}	7	6
(United States) A Martin	7^{7}	5	3
PR	(Jamaica) B Bicknell	3	7^{7}	4
Q	(United States) A Fenty	6	6^{2}	6

Quarterfinals
1	(Austria) J Rodionov	6	4	2
(Jordan) A Shelbayh	3	6	6
4	(Lebanon) B Hassan	6	1	6
Q	(United States) A Fenty	4	6	1

Semifinals
(Jordan) A Shelbayh	6	6
4	(Lebanon) B Hassan	3	1

=== Bottom half ===
First round
7	(United States) M Krueger	3	6	6^{3}
PR	(Australia) P Sekulic	6	2	7^{7}
Q	(Italy) Pietro Fellin	2	7^{7}	6
(Italy) F Bondioli	6	6^{3}	2
(United States) A Rybakov	6	6
WC	(United States) Tyler Cox	3	1
(Belgium) T Colson	3	4
3	(Japan) J Trotter	6	6
6	(Kazakhstan) D Popko	6	7
Q	(United States) Q Vandecasteele	4	5
Q	(Barbados) D King	2	3
(United States) Andre Ilagan	6	6
JR	(France) T Papamalamis	6	1^{r}
(Australia) M Bouzige	3	4
(Sweden) O Wallin	1	6	6
2	(United Kingdom) J Pinnington Jones	6	3	2

Second round
PR	(Australia) P Sekulic	6	6
Q	(Italy) P Fellin	4	2
(United States) A Rybakov	6	7^{10}
3	(Japan) J Trotter	4	6^{8}
6	(Kazakhstan) D Popko	4	4
(United States) A Ilagan	6	6
(Australia) M Bouzige	6^{4}	7^{7}	6
(Sweden) O Wallin	7^{7}	6^{1}	3

Quarterfinals
PR	(Australia) P Sekulic	6^{5}	4
(United States) A Rybakov	7^{7}	6
(United States) A Ilagan	5	6	6
(Australia) M Bouzige	7	4	1

Semifinals
(United States) A Rybakov	7^{7}	6
(United States) A Ilagan	6^{4}	3
