= 2024 Las Vegas Challenger – Singles =

Singles
- 2024 Las Vegas Challenger

Final
- Champion: (United States) Learner Tien
- Runner-up: (United States) Tristan Boyer
- Score: 7–5, 1–6, 6–3

Events
Singles	Doubles
← 2022 ·	Las Vegas Challenger	· 2025 →

Tennys Sandgren was the defending champion but chose not to defend his title.

Learner Tien won the title after defeating Tristan Boyer 7–5, 1–6, 6–3 in the final.

== Seeds ==
1. (United States) Patrick Kypson (first round)
2. (United States) Denis Kudla (quarterfinals)
3. (United States) Learner Tien (champion)
4. (United States) Brandon Holt (first round)
5. (Jordan) Abdullah Shelbayh (semifinals)
6. (United States) Tristan Boyer (final)
7. (Australia) Bernard Tomic (quarterfinals, retired)
8. (Argentina) Juan Pablo Ficovich (second round)

== Draw ==
Key

- Q = Qualifier
- WC = Wild card
- LL = Lucky loser
- Alt = Alternate
- ITF = ITF entry
- PR = Protected ranking
- SR = Special ranking
- SE = Special exempt
- JE = Junior exempt
- JR = Junior Accelerator Programme entrant
- CO = College Accelerator Programme entrant
- NG = Next Gen Accelerator Program entrant
- w/o = Walkover
- r = Retired
- d = Defaulted

=== Finals ===
Semifinals
6	(United States) Tristan Boyer	4	6	7^{7}
(Brazil) Karue Sell	6	1	6^{4}
3	(United States) Learner Tien	6	3	6
5	(Jordan) Abdullah Shelbayh	3	6	4

Final
6	(United States) Tristan Boyer	5	6	3
3	(United States) Learner Tien	7	1	6

=== Top half ===
First round
1	(United States) P Kypson	3	6	1
(United States) A Martin	6	1	6
(Australia) L Saville	2	5
Q	(United States) Q Vandecasteele	6	7
(United States) Christian Langmo	3	1
WC	(United States) C Smith	6	6
Q	(United States) O Kumar	6	2	3
6	(United States) T Boyer	4	6	6
4	(United States) B Holt	6^{3}	6	4
Q	(United States) Patrick Maloney	7^{7}	1	6
Alt	(United States) G Nanda	4	4
WC	(United States) K Bigun	6	6
(United States) S Kirchheimer	1	2
(Brazil) K Sell	6	6
Q	(United States) C Altamirano	3	5
8	(Argentina) JP Ficovich	6	7

Second round
(United States) A Martin	6	7
Q	(United States) Q Vandecasteele	1	5
WC	(United States) C Smith	6^{5}	2
6	(United States) T Boyer	7^{7}	6
Q	(United States) P Maloney	3	4
WC	(United States) K Bigun	6	6
(Brazil) K Sell	3	6	7^{13}
8	(Argentina) JP Ficovich	6	1	6^{11}

Quarterfinals
(United States) A Martin	6	3	6^{3}
6	(United States) T Boyer	3	6	7^{7}
WC	(United States) K Bigun	2	3
(Brazil) K Sell	6	6

Semifinals
6	(United States) T Boyer	4	6	7^{7}
(Brazil) K Sell	6	1	6^{4}

=== Bottom half ===
First round
7	(Australia) B Tomic	7^{7}	6
(United States) Micah Braswell	6^{1}	4
(United States) B Kuzuhara	5	4
(United States) E Spizzirri	7	6
(United States) C Kingsley	5	7^{7}	6
WC	(United States) JJ Tracy	7	6^{0}	3
Q	(United States) A Rybakov	7^{8}	2	2
3	(United States) L Tien	6^{6}	6	6
5	(Jordan) A Shelbayh	6	3	7
Q	(United States) T Hilderbrand	3	6	5
(Czech Republic) M Gengel	6	6
(Japan) N Nakagawa	3	2
(Japan) J Trotter	6	4	6
(Mexico) E Escobedo	4	6	4
(United Kingdom) J Monday	6^{5}	3
2	(United States) D Kudla	7^{7}	6

Second round
7	(Australia) B Tomic	7	6^{3}	6
(United States) E Spizzirri	5	7^{7}	4
(United States) C Kingsley	3	3
3	(United States) L Tien	6	6
5	(Jordan) A Shelbayh	6	6
(Czech Republic) M Gengel	3	4
(Japan) J Trotter	4	1
2	(United States) D Kudla	6	6

Quarterfinals
7	(Australia) B Tomic	5	0^{r}
3	(United States) L Tien	7	0
5	(Jordan) A Shelbayh	6	3	6
2	(United States) D Kudla	4	6	2

Semifinals
3	(United States) L Tien	6	3	6
5	(Jordan) A Shelbayh	3	6	4
