= 2022 Las Vegas Challenger =

- Date: 24 – 30 October
- Edition: 7th
- Surface: Hard / Outdoors
- Location: Las Vegas, United States

Champions

Singles
- (United States) Tennys Sandgren

Doubles
- (United Kingdom) Julian Cash / (United Kingdom) Henry Patten
← 2021 ·	Las Vegas Challenger	· 2024 →

The 2022 Las Vegas Challenger was a professional tennis tournament played on hard courts. It was the seventh edition of the revamped tournament which was the part of the 2022 ATP Challenger Tour. It took place in Las Vegas, United States between 24 and 30 October 2022.

== Singles main draw entrants ==
=== Seeds ===
Country	Player	Rank^{1}	Seed
USA	Denis Kudla	99	1
USA	Steve Johnson	117	2
CAN	Vasek Pospisil	121	3
USA	Stefan Kozlov	133	4
ARG	Juan Pablo Ficovich	143	5
USA	Ben Shelton	159	6
ARG	Facundo Mena	161	7
USA	Aleksandar Kovacevic	165	8

- ^{1} Rankings are as of October 17, 2022.

=== Other entrants ===
The following players received wildcards into the singles main draw:

- (Moldova) Alexander Cozbinov
- (United States) Cannon Kingsley
- (Belgium) Maxim Verboven

The following player received entry into the singles main draw as an alternate:

- (United States) Govind Nanda

The following players received entry from the qualifying draw:

- (Republic of Ireland) Simon Carr
- (United States) Omni Kumar
- (United States) Aidan Mayo
- (United States) Alfredo Perez
- (United Kingdom) Jack Pinnington Jones
- (United States) Tennys Sandgren

== Champions ==
=== Singles ===
- (United States) Tennys Sandgren def. (United States) Stefan Kozlov 7–5, 6–3.

=== Doubles ===
- (United Kingdom) Julian Cash / (United Kingdom) Henry Patten def. (Germany) Constantin Frantzen / (United States) Reese Stalder 6–4, 7–6^{(7–1)}.
