= 2025 Las Vegas Challenger – Doubles =

Doubles
- 2025 Las Vegas Challenger

Final
- Champions: (United States) Benjamin Kittay (United States) Joshua Sheehy
- Runners-up: (New Zealand) Finn Reynolds (New Zealand) James Watt
- Score: 7–5, 7–6^{(7–2)}

Events
| Singles | Doubles |
- Las Vegas Challenger

Trey Hilderbrand and Alex Lawson were the defending champions but chose not to defend their title.

Benjamin Kittay and Joshua Sheehy won the title after defeating Finn Reynolds and James Watt 7–5, 7–6^{(7–2)} in the final.

== Seeds ==
1. (New Zealand) Finn Reynolds / (New Zealand) James Watt (final)
2. (India) Siddhant Banthia / (India) Ramkumar Ramanathan (quarterfinals)
3. (United States) George Goldhoff / (United States) Theodore Winegar (semifinals)
4. (Philippines) Francis Alcantara / (Netherlands) Thijmen Loof (first round)

== Draw ==
Key

- Q = Qualifier
- WC = Wild card
- LL = Lucky loser
- Alt = Alternate
- ITF = ITF entry
- PR = Protected ranking
- SR = Special ranking
- SE = Special exempt
- JE = Junior exempt
- JR = Junior Accelerator Programme entrant
- CO = College Accelerator Programme entrant
- NG = Next Gen Accelerator Program entrant
- w/o = Walkover
- r = Retired
- d = Defaulted

=== Draw ===
First round
1 | (New Zealand) F Reynolds (New Zealand) J Watt | 6 | 6
(United Kingdom) S Duncan (United Kingdom) T Hands | 1 | 4
(Germany) D Masur (Austria) J Rodionov | 6 | 4 | [10]
(Zimbabwe) CJ Lock (Colombia) N Mejía | 2 | 6 | [7]
3 | (United States) G Goldhoff (United States) T Winegar | 7 | 5 | [10]
(Mexico) H Hach Verdugo (United States) D Milavsky | 5 | 7 | [5]
(Australia) P Harper (United Kingdom) J Monday | 7^{7} | 6
(Italy) F Bondioli (Italy) CA Caniato | 6^{3} | 3
(United States) K Chopra (United States) A Martin | 6 | 6
(Venezuela) Juan José Bianchi (United States) N Schachter | 3 | 2
WC | (United States) B Kittay (United States) J Sheehy | 6 | 6
4 | (Philippines) FC Alcantara (Netherlands) T Loof | 3 | 4
(United States) M Krueger (Venezuela) LD Martínez | 7^{7} | 4 | [10]
(United States) P Kumar (Australia) K Pearson | 6^{3} | 6 | [8]
WC | (United States) A Perez (United States) Jamie Vance | 6 | 4 | [9]
2 | (India) S Banthia (India) R Ramanathan | 4 | 6 | [11]

Quarterfinals
1 | (New Zealand) F Reynolds (New Zealand) J Watt | 6 | 3 | [10]
(Germany) D Masur (Austria) J Rodionov | 3 | 6 | [8]
3 | (United States) G Goldhoff (United States) T Winegar | 6 | 6
(Australia) P Harper (United Kingdom) J Monday | 3 | 4
(United States) K Chopra (United States) A Martin | 7^{7} | 4 | [11]
WC | (United States) B Kittay (United States) J Sheehy | 6^{1} | 6 | [13]
(United States) M Krueger (Venezuela) LD Martínez | 6 | 6
2 | (India) S Banthia (India) R Ramanathan | 4 | 4

Semifinals
1 | (New Zealand) F Reynolds (New Zealand) J Watt | 6 | 6^{8} | [10]
3 | (United States) G Goldhoff (United States) T Winegar | 4 | 7^{10} | [4]
WC | (United States) B Kittay (United States) J Sheehy | 6^{4} | 7 | [10]
(United States) M Krueger (Venezuela) LD Martínez | 7^{7} | 5 | [5]

Final
1 | (New Zealand) F Reynolds (New Zealand) J Watt | 5 | 6^{2}
WC | (United States) B Kittay (United States) J Sheehy | 7 | 7^{7}
