= 2019 Las Vegas Challenger =

- Date: 14–20 October
- Edition: 5th
- Draw: 48S / 16D
- Surface: Hard / Outdoors
- Location: Las Vegas, United States

Champions

Singles
- (Canada) Vasek Pospisil

Doubles
- (Philippines) Ruben Gonzales / (South Africa) Ruan Roelofse
← 2018 ·	Las Vegas Challenger	· 2021 →

The 2019 Las Vegas Challenger was a professional tennis tournament played on hard courts. It was the fifth edition of the revamped tournament which was the part of the 2019 ATP Challenger Tour. It took place in Las Vegas, United States between 14 and 20 October 2019.

== Singles main draw entrants ==
=== Seeds ===
Country	Player	Rank^{1}	Seed
USA	Steve Johnson	99	1
JPN	Taro Daniel	111	2
USA	Marcos Giron	126	3
SLO	Blaž Rola	131	4
AUS	James Duckworth	143	5
ECU	Emilio Gómez	147	6
CAN	Peter Polansky	163	7
BAR	Darian King	171	8
ESP	Nicola Kuhn	174	9
AUS	Christopher O'Connell	192	10
USA	Mitchell Krueger	201	11
KAZ	Dmitry Popko	209	12
USA	Jack Sock	210	13
CHI	Alejandro Tabilo	224	14
USA	Donald Young	233	15
USA	J. J. Wolf	241	16

- ^{1} Rankings are as of October 7, 2019.

=== Other entrants ===
The following players received wildcards into the singles main draw:

- (Moldova) Alexander Cozbinov
- (United States) Steve Johnson
- (United States) Alex Kobelt
- (United States) Stefan Kozlov
- (United States) Evan Song

The following players received entry from the qualifying draw:

- (United States) Dennis Novikov
- (Greece) Michail Pervolarakis

== Champions ==
=== Singles ===
- (Canada) Vasek Pospisil def. (Australia) James Duckworth 7–5, 6–7^{(11–13)}, 6–3.

=== Doubles ===
- (Philippines) Ruben Gonzales / (South Africa) Ruan Roelofse def. (United States) Nathan Pasha / (United States) Max Schnur 2–6, 6–3, [10–8].
