= 2024 Las Vegas Challenger – Doubles =

Doubles
- 2024 Las Vegas Challenger

Final
- Champions: (United States) Trey Hilderbrand (United States) Alex Lawson
- Runners-up: (United States) Tristan Boyer (United States) Tennyson Whiting
- Score: 6–7^{(9–11)}, 7–5, [10–8]

Events
Singles	Doubles
- Las Vegas Challenger

Julian Cash and Henry Patten were the defending champions but chose not to defend their title.

Trey Hilderbrand and Alex Lawson won the title after defeating Tristan Boyer and Tennyson Whiting 6–7^{(9–11)}, 7–5, [10–8] in the final.

== Seeds ==
1. (United States) Denis Kudla / (Australia) Luke Saville (quarterfinals)
2. (United States) Trey Hilderbrand / (United States) Alex Lawson (champions)
3. (United States) Mac Kiger / (Canada) Benjamin Sigouin (first round)
4. (Australia) Patrick Harper / (Australia) Calum Puttergill (first round)

== Draw ==
Key

- Q = Qualifier
- WC = Wild card
- LL = Lucky loser
- Alt = Alternate
- ITF = ITF entry
- PR = Protected ranking
- SR = Special ranking
- SE = Special exempt
- JE = Junior exempt
- JR = Junior Accelerator Programme entrant
- CO = College Accelerator Programme entrant
- NG = Next Gen Accelerator Program entrant
- w/o = Walkover
- r = Retired
- d = Defaulted

=== Draw ===
First round
1	(United States) D Kudla (Australia) L Saville	6	6
(United States) Christian Langmo (Australia) D Sweeny	2	4
WC	(United States) C Harrison (United States) R Harrison	3	6	[5]
(Jordan) A Shelbayh (Canada) K Stevenson	6	2	[10]
4	(Australia) P Harper (Australia) C Puttergill	3	4
(Australia) K Pearson (United States) J Sheehy	6	6
(Canada) JC Aguilar (Argentina) JP Ficovich	3	4
(United States) T Boyer (United States) Tennyson Whiting	6	6
WC	(United States) A Rybakov (United States) Jamie Vance	7^{7}	6
(United States) Felix Corwin (United States) S Kirchheimer	6^{4}	3
(United States) P Kumar (United States) N Schachter	6^{3}	7^{7}	[10]
3	(United States) M Kiger (Canada) B Sigouin	7^{7}	6^{3}	[6]
(United States) C Kingsley (United States) P Trhac	3	5
(United States) E Spizzirri (United States) T Zink	6	7
(United States) Nathan Ponwith (United States) JJ Tracy	6^{5}	6^{0}
2	(United States) T Hilderbrand (United States) A Lawson	7^{7}	7^{7}

Quarterfinals
1	(United States) D Kudla (Australia) L Saville	4	2
(Jordan) A Shelbayh (Canada) K Stevenson	6	6
(Australia) K Pearson (United States) J Sheehy	3	6^{4}
(United States) T Boyer (United States) T Whiting	6	7^{7}
WC	(United States) A Rybakov (United States) Jam Vance	4	4
(United States) P Kumar (United States) N Schachter	6	6
(United States) E Spizzirri (United States) T Zink	6	6^{3}	[7]
2	(United States) T Hilderbrand (United States) A Lawson	3	7^{7}	[10]

Semifinals
(Jordan) A Shelbayh (Canada) K Stevenson	4	4
(United States) T Boyer (United States) T Whiting	6	6
(United States) P Kumar (United States) N Schachter	6^{5}	5
2	(United States) T Hilderbrand (United States) A Lawson	7^{7}	7

Final
(United States) T Boyer (United States) T Whiting	7^{11}	5	[8]
2	(United States) T Hilderbrand (United States) A Lawson	6^{9}	7	[10]
