= 2018 Las Vegas Challenger – Doubles =

Doubles
- 2018 Las Vegas Challenger

Final
- Champions: (El Salvador) Marcelo Arévalo (Venezuela) Roberto Maytín
- Runners-up: (United States) Robert Galloway (United States) Nathan Pasha
- Score: 6–3, 6–3

Events
Singles	Doubles
← 2017 ·	Las Vegas Challenger	· 2019 →

Brydan Klein and Joe Salisbury were the defending champions but chose not to defend their title.

Marcelo Arévalo and Roberto Maytín won the title after defeating Robert Galloway and Nathan Pasha 6–3, 6–3 in the final.

== Seeds ==
1. (El Salvador) Marcelo Arévalo / (Venezuela) Roberto Maytín (champions)
2. (Australia) Matt Reid / (Australia) John-Patrick Smith (quarterfinals)
3. (United States) Hunter Reese / (United States) Jackson Withrow (first round)
4. (United States) Robert Galloway / (United States) Nathan Pasha (final)

== Draw ==
=== Key ===
- Q = Qualifier
- WC = Wild card
- LL = Lucky loser
- Alt = Alternate
- ITF = ITF entry
- PR = Protected ranking
- SR = Special ranking
- SE = Special exempt
- JE = Junior exempt
- JR = Junior Accelerator Programme entrant
- CO = College Accelerator Programme entrant
- NG = Next Gen Accelerator Program entrant
- w/o = Walkover
- r = Retired
- d = Defaulted

First round
1	(El Salvador) M Arévalo (Venezuela) R Maytín	6	6
WC	(United States) S Kozlov (United States) Jack Vance	4	4
(Germany) D Köpfer (Japan) T Matsui	6	6
WC	(Zimbabwe) CJ Lock (Portugal) B Saraiva	1	3
3	(United States) H Reese (United States) J Withrow	5	5
(Philippines) R Gonzales (United States) N Lammons	7	7
(Mexico) H Hach Verdugo (Venezuela) LD Martínez	4	4
(Chinese Taipei) J Jung (United States) M Krueger	6	6
(South Africa) L Harris (South Africa) R Roelofse	w/o
Q	(United States) JC Aragone (Australia) T Kokkinakis
(Canada) A Shamasdin (Sweden) A Siljeström	6^{4}	6^{4}
4	(United States) R Galloway (United States) N Pasha	7^{7}	7^{7}
WC	(United States) Alenik Clayton (Sweden) Eric Samuelsson	4	2
(Barbados) D King (United States) N Rubin	6	6
(Poland) K Majchrzak (Croatia) N Serdarušić	6^{3}	1
2	(Australia) M Reid (Australia) J-P Smith	7^{7}	6

Quarterfinals
1	(El Salvador) M Arévalo (Venezuela) R Maytín	7^{7}	5	[10]
(Germany) D Köpfer (Japan) T Matsui	6^{2}	7	[2]
(Philippines) R Gonzales (United States) N Lammons	3	6^{4}
(Chinese Taipei) J Jung (United States) M Krueger	6	7^{7}
(South Africa) L Harris (South Africa) R Roelofse	2	6^{5}
4	(United States) R Galloway (United States) N Pasha	6	7^{7}
(Barbados) D King (United States) N Rubin	4	7^{8}	[14]
2	(Australia) M Reid (Australia) J-P Smith	6	6^{6}	[12]

Semifinals
1	(El Salvador) M Arévalo (Venezuela) R Maytín	7	6^{5}	[10]
(Chinese Taipei) J Jung (United States) M Krueger	5	7^{7}	[5]
4	(United States) R Galloway (United States) N Pasha	6	6
(Barbados) D King (United States) N Rubin	3	2

Final
1	(El Salvador) M Arévalo (Venezuela) R Maytín	6	6
4	(United States) R Galloway (United States) N Pasha	3	3
