= 2015 Las Vegas Challenger – Singles =

Singles
- 2015 Las Vegas Challenger

Final
- Champion: (Netherlands) Thiemo de Bakker
- Runner-up: (Slovenia) Grega Žemlja
- Score: 3–6, 6–3, 6–1

Events
Singles	Doubles
Las Vegas Challenger	· 2016 →

This was the first edition of the tournament, Thiemo de Bakker won the title defeating Grega Žemlja in the final 3–6, 6–3, 6–1.

== Seeds ==
1. (United States) Austin Krajicek (quarterfinals)
2. (United States) Tim Smyczek (second round)
3. (United States) Ryan Harrison (first round)
4. (Germany) Dustin Brown (first round)
5. (Slovenia) Blaž Rola (quarterfinals)
6. (United States) Jared Donaldson (quarterfinals)
7. (Netherlands) Thiemo de Bakker (champion)
8. (United States) Dennis Novikov (semifinals)

== Draw ==
Key

- Q = Qualifier
- WC = Wild card
- LL = Lucky loser
- Alt = Alternate
- ITF = ITF entry
- PR = Protected ranking
- SR = Special ranking
- SE = Special exempt
- JE = Junior exempt
- JR = Junior Accelerator Programme entrant
- CO = College Accelerator Programme entrant
- NG = Next Gen Accelerator Program entrant
- w/o = Walkover
- r = Retired
- d = Defaulted

=== Finals ===
Semifinals
8	(United States) Dennis Novikov	6	2	6^{5}
(Slovenia) Grega Žemlja	4	6	7^{7}
7	(Netherlands) Thiemo de Bakker	7^{7}	4	6
(Slovenia) Blaž Kavčič	6^{5}	6	4

Final
(Slovenia) Grega Žemlja	6	3	1
7	(Netherlands) Thiemo de Bakker	3	6	6

=== Top half ===
First round
1	(United States) A Krajicek	6	6
(United Kingdom) L Broady	3	2
Q	(Switzerland) H Laaksonen	5	2
(Czech Republic) M Michalička	7	6
(United Kingdom) D Evans	3	6	6
(United States) A Sarkissian	6	4	3
WC	(United States) Evan Song	4	4
8	(United States) D Novikov	6	6
4	(Germany) D Brown	6^{5}	6	3
(Slovenia) G Žemlja	7^{7}	1	6
SE	(United States) T Fritz	6	6
(Colombia) N Barrientos	3	2
(United States) F Tiafoe	6	4	7^{8}
Q	(United States) Dennis Nevolo	2	6	6^{6}
Q	(Colombia) E Struvay	6^{6}	4
5	(Slovenia) B Rola	7^{8}	6

Second round
1	(United States) A Krajicek	7	7
(Czech Republic) M Michalička	5	5
(United Kingdom) D Evans	4	6^{2}
8	(United States) D Novikov	6	7^{7}
(Slovenia) G Žemlja	6^{6}	6	6
SE	(United States) T Fritz	7^{8}	2	2
(United States) F Tiafoe	1	4
5	(Slovenia) B Rola	6	6

Quarterfinals
1	(United States) A Krajicek	6^{2}	6	6^{3}
8	(United States) D Novikov	7^{7}	3	7^{7}
(Slovenia) G Žemlja	6	3	6
5	(Slovenia) B Rola	2	6	3

Semifinals
8	(United States) D Novikov	6	2	6^{5}
(Slovenia) G Žemlja	4	6	7^{7}

=== Bottom half ===
First round
7	(Netherlands) T de Bakker	6	6
(United States) M Krueger	2	4
WC	(Sweden) Jakob Amilon	0	2
(Barbados) D King	6	6
(Ecuador) G Lapentti	6	6
WC	(United States) Ace Matias	3	0
WC	(United States) M Mmoh	6	6
3	(United States) R Harrison	2	3
6	(United States) J Donaldson	6	6
(Republic of Ireland) J McGee	3	1
Q	(United States) E Quigley	6	7^{7}
(United States) C Buchanan	0	6^{4}
(Canada) P Bester	5	0
(Slovenia) B Kavčič	7	6
(Canada) F Dancevic	4	2
2	(United States) T Smyczek	6	6

Second round
7	(Netherlands) T de Bakker	6	6
(Barbados) D King	2	4
(Ecuador) G Lapentti	3	6	3
WC	(United States) M Mmoh	6	3	6
6	(United States) J Donaldson	6	2	7^{7}
Q	(United States) E Quigley	2	6	6^{4}
(Slovenia) B Kavčič	7^{7}	6
2	(United States) T Smyczek	6^{5}	4

Quarterfinals
7	(Netherlands) T de Bakker	6	6
WC	(United States) M Mmoh	1	3
6	(United States) J Donaldson	6	5	1
(Slovenia) B Kavčič	3	7	6

Semifinals
7	(Netherlands) T de Bakker	7^{7}	4	6
(Slovenia) B Kavčič	6^{5}	6	4
