= 2021 Las Vegas Challenger – Doubles =

Doubles
- 2021 Las Vegas Challenger

Final
- Champions: (United States) William Blumberg (United States) Max Schnur
- Runners-up: (Chinese Taipei) Jason Jung (United States) Evan King
- Score: 7–5, 6–7^{(5–7)}, [10–5]

Events
Singles	Doubles
← 2019 ·	Las Vegas Challenger	· 2022 →

Ruben Gonzales and Ruan Roelofse were the defending champions but chose to defend their title with different partners. Gonzales partnered Hunter Johnson but lost in the first round to Hans Hach Verdugo and Miguel Ángel Reyes-Varela. Roelofse partnered Christopher Rungkat but lost in the quarterfinals to William Blumberg and Max Schnur.

Blumberg and Schnur won the title after defeating Jason Jung and Evan King 7–5, 6–7^{(5–7)}, [10–5] in the final.

== Seeds ==
1. (United States) Nathaniel Lammons / (United States) Jackson Withrow (semifinals)
2. (Mexico) Hans Hach Verdugo / (Mexico) Miguel Ángel Reyes-Varela (semifinals)
3. (United States) Robert Galloway / (United States) Alex Lawson (quarterfinals)
4. (United States) William Blumberg / (United States) Max Schnur (champions)

== Draw ==
=== Key ===
- Q = Qualifier
- WC = Wild card
- LL = Lucky loser
- Alt = Alternate
- SE = Special exempt
- PR = Protected ranking
- ITF = ITF entry
- JE = Junior exempt
- w/o = Walkover
- r = Retired
- d = Defaulted
- SR = Special ranking

First round
1	(United States) N Lammons (United States) J Withrow	7^{7}	7
(United States) T Sandgren (Denmark) M Torpegaard	6^{4}	5
WC	(United States) Jack Vance (United States) Jamie Vance	4	4
(United States) M Mmoh (United States) D Novikov	6	6
4	(United States) W Blumberg (United States) M Schnur	6	6
WC	(United States) Zac Brodney (Serbia) Milos Dabic	4	2
(South Africa) R Roelofse (Indonesia) C Rungkat	7^{7}	6
WC	(United States) Jack Atherton (Sweden) Anton Örnberg	6^{3}	1
(Chinese Taipei) J Jung (United States) E King	7^{7}	6
(United States) D Kudla (Sweden) R Lindstedt	6^{4}	1
(United States) S Kozlov (Canada) P Polansky	4	6^{5}
3	(United States) R Galloway (United States) A Lawson	6	7^{7}
(United States) C Harrison (United States) M Krueger	7	6
(United States) JC Aragone (Philippines) T Huey	5	4
(Philippines) R Gonzales (United States) H Johnson	1	2
2	(Mexico) H Hach Verdugo (Mexico) MÁ Reyes-Varela	6	6

Quarterfinals
1	(United States) N Lammons (United States) J Withrow	7^{9}	6
(United States) M Mmoh (United States) D Novikov	6^{7}	3
4	(United States) W Blumberg (United States) M Schnur	6	6
(South Africa) R Roelofse (Indonesia) C Rungkat	3	4
(Chinese Taipei) J Jung (United States) E King	3	7^{7}	[10]
3	(United States) R Galloway (United States) A Lawson	6	6^{4}	[8]
(United States) C Harrison (United States) M Krueger	5	3
2	(Mexico) H Hach Verdugo (Mexico) MÁ Reyes-Varela	7	6

Semifinals
1	(United States) N Lammons (United States) J Withrow	2	4
4	(United States) W Blumberg (United States) M Schnur	6	6
(Chinese Taipei) J Jung (United States) E King	6	3	[10]
2	(Mexico) H Hach Verdugo (Mexico) MÁ Reyes-Varela	4	6	[6]

Final
4	(United States) W Blumberg (United States) M Schnur	7	6^{5}	[10]
(Chinese Taipei) J Jung (United States) E King	5	7^{7}	[5]
