= 2015 Las Vegas Challenger – Doubles =

Doubles
- 2015 Las Vegas Challenger

Final
- Champions: (Australia) Carsten Ball (Germany) Dustin Brown
- Runners-up: (South Africa) Dean O'Brien (South Africa) Ruan Roelofse
- Score: 3–6, 6–3, [10–6]

Events
Singles	Doubles
- Las Vegas Challenger

This was the first edition of the tournament, Carsten Ball and Dustin Brown won the title beating Dean O'Brien and Ruan Roelofse in the final 3–6, 6–3, [10–6].

== Seeds ==
1. (Mexico) César Ramírez / (Mexico) Miguel Ángel Reyes-Varela (quarterfinals)
2. (Australia) Carsten Ball / (Germany) Dustin Brown (champions)
3. (South Africa) Dean O'Brien / (South Africa) Ruan Roelofse (final)
4. (Colombia) Nicolás Barrientos / (Colombia) Eduardo Struvay (semifinals)

== Draw ==
Key

- Q = Qualifier
- WC = Wild card
- LL = Lucky loser
- Alt = Alternate
- ITF = ITF entry
- PR = Protected ranking
- SR = Special ranking
- SE = Special exempt
- JE = Junior exempt
- JR = Junior Accelerator Programme entrant
- CO = College Accelerator Programme entrant
- NG = Next Gen Accelerator Program entrant
- w/o = Walkover
- r = Retired
- d = Defaulted

First round
1	(Mexico) C Ramírez (Mexico) MÁ Reyes-Varela	6	6
(United States) S Bangoura (United States) M Seeberger	3	3
WC	(United States) J Kielbowicz (United States) Denys Pume	5	2
(United Kingdom) L Broady (United Kingdom) D Evans	7	6
3	(South Africa) D O'Brien (South Africa) R Roelofse	6	6
(Uruguay) A Behar (Philippines) R Gonzales	1	3
(United States) C Buchanan (United States) M Krueger	6^{3}	6	[3]
(Canada) P Bester (Canada) P Polansky	7^{7}	0	[10]
(Switzerland) H Laaksonen (Czech Republic) M Michalička	6	6
WC	(United States) Jack Vance (United States) Jamie Vance	1	2
WC	(United States) B Battistone (Australia) T Blenkiron	1	3
4	(Colombia) N Barrientos (Colombia) E Struvay	6	6
Alt	(United States) Jean-Yves Aubone (United States) Dennis Nevolo	3	7	[2]
(Republic of Ireland) J Cluskey (United Kingdom) D Walsh	6	5	[10]
(Slovenia) B Kavčič (Slovenia) G Žemlja	4	1
2	(Australia) C Ball (Germany) D Brown	6	6

Quarterfinals
1	(Mexico) C Ramírez (Mexico) MÁ Reyes-Varela	6^{5}	4
(United Kingdom) L Broady (United Kingdom) D Evans	7^{7}	6
3	(South Africa) D O'Brien (South Africa) R Roelofse	6	2	[11]
(Canada) P Bester (Canada) P Polansky	3	6	[9]
(Switzerland) H Laaksonen (Czech Republic) M Michalička
4	(Colombia) N Barrientos (Colombia) E Struvay	w/o
(Republic of Ireland) J Cluskey (United Kingdom) D Walsh	2	4
2	(Australia) C Ball (Germany) D Brown	6	6

Semifinals
(United Kingdom) L Broady (United Kingdom) D Evans	1	3
3	(South Africa) D O'Brien (South Africa) R Roelofse	6	6
4	(Colombia) N Barrientos (Colombia) E Struvay	7^{8}	4	[9]
2	(Australia) C Ball (Germany) D Brown	6^{6}	6	[11]

Final
3	(South Africa) D O'Brien (South Africa) R Roelofse	6	3	[6]
2	(Australia) C Ball (Germany) D Brown	3	6	[10]
