= 2024 Las Vegas Challenger =

- Date: 9 – 15 September
- Edition: 8th
- Surface: Hard / Outdoors
- Location: Las Vegas, United States

Champions

Singles
- (United States) Learner Tien

Doubles
- (United States) Trey Hilderbrand / (United States) Alex Lawson
← 2022 ·	Las Vegas Challenger	· 2025 →

The 2024 Las Vegas Challenger was a professional tennis tournament played on hard courts. It was the eighth edition of the revamped tournament which was the part of the 2024 ATP Challenger Tour. It took place in Las Vegas, United States between September 9 and September 15, 2024.

== Singles main draw entrants ==
=== Seeds ===
Country	Player	Rank^{1}	Seed
USA	Patrick Kypson	166	1
USA	Denis Kudla	189	2
USA	Learner Tien	191	3
USA	Brandon Holt	208	4
JOR	Abdullah Shelbayh	215	5
USA	Tristan Boyer	230	6
AUS	Bernard Tomic	235	7
ARG	Juan Pablo Ficovich	281	8

- ^{1} Rankings are as of August 26, 2024.

=== Other entrants ===
The following players received wildcards into the singles main draw:

- (United States) Kaylan Bigun
- (United States) Colton Smith
- (United States) JJ Tracy

The following player received entry into the singles main draw as an alternate:

- (United States) Govind Nanda

The following players received entry from the qualifying draw:

- (United States) Collin Altamirano
- (United States) Trey Hilderbrand
- (United States) Omni Kumar
- (United States) Patrick Maloney
- (United States) Alex Rybakov
- (United States) Quinn Vandecasteele

== Champions ==
=== Singles ===
- (United States) Learner Tien def. (United States) Tristan Boyer 7–5, 1–6, 6–3.

=== Doubles ===
- (United States) Trey Hilderbrand / (United States) Alex Lawson def. (United States) Tristan Boyer / (United States) Tennyson Whiting 6–7^{(9–11)}, 7–5, [10–8].
