= 2025 Las Vegas Challenger =

- Date: 22 – 28 September
- Edition: 9th
- Surface: Hard / Outdoors
- Location: Las Vegas, United States

Champions

Singles
- (Jordan) Abdullah Shelbayh

Doubles
- (United States) Benjamin Kittay / (United States) Joshua Sheehy
← 2024 ·	Las Vegas Challenger	· 2026 →

The 2025 Las Vegas Challenger was a professional tennis tournament played on hard courts. It was the ninth edition of the revamped tournament which was the part of the 2025 ATP Challenger Tour. It took place in Las Vegas, United States between September 22 and September 28, 2025.

== Singles main draw entrants ==
=== Seeds ===
Country	Player	Rank^{1}	Seed
AUT	Jurij Rodionov	157	1
GBR	Jack Pinnington Jones	177	2
JPN	James Trotter	187	3
LBN	Benjamin Hassan	197	4
COL	Nicolás Mejía	201	5
KAZ	Dmitry Popko	219	6
USA	Mitchell Krueger	238	7
GBR	Johannus Monday	239	8

- ^{1} Rankings are as of September 15, 2025.

=== Other entrants ===
The following players received wildcards into the singles main draw:

- (United States) Tyler Cox
- (United States) Garrett Johns
- (United States) Cooper Williams

The following players received entry into the singles main draw using protected rankings:

- (Jamaica) Blaise Bicknell
- (Australia) Philip Sekulic

The following player received entry into the singles main draw through the Junior Accelerator programme:

- (France) Théo Papamalamis

The following players received entry from the qualifying draw:

- (Italy) Pietro Fellin
- (United States) Andrew Fenty
- (Barbados) Darian King
- (Germany) Daniel Masur
- (United States) Quinn Vandecasteele
- (Australia) Edward Winter

== Champions ==
=== Singles ===
- (Jordan) Abdullah Shelbayh def. (United States) Alex Rybakov 6–2, 6–4.

=== Doubles ===
- (United States) Benjamin Kittay / (United States) Joshua Sheehy def. (New Zealand) Finn Reynolds / (New Zealand) James Watt 7–5, 7–6^{(7–2)}.
