= 2017 Las Vegas Challenger =

- Date: 16–22 October 2017
- Edition: 3rd
- Draw: 32S / 16D
- Surface: Hard / Outdoors
- Location: Las Vegas, United States

Champions

Singles
- (United States) Stefan Kozlov

Doubles
- (United Kingdom) Brydan Klein / (United Kingdom) Joe Salisbury
← 2016 ·	Las Vegas Challenger	· 2018 →

The 2017 Las Vegas Challenger was a professional tennis tournament played on hard courts. It was the third edition of the revamped tournament which was the part of the 2017 ATP Challenger Tour. It took place in Las Vegas, United States between 16 and 22 October 2017.

== Singles main draw entrants ==
=== Seeds ===
Country	Player	Rank^{1}	Seed
USA	Tennys Sandgren	98	1
GBR	Cameron Norrie	111	2
USA	Bjorn Fratangelo	118	3
USA	Stefan Kozlov	142	4
SRB	Nikola Milojević	149	5
USA	Michael Mmoh	153	6
AUS	Sam Groth	166	7
USA	Reilly Opelka	173	8

- ^{1} Rankings are as of October 10, 2017.

=== Other entrants ===
The following players received wildcards into the singles main draw:

- (South Africa) Ruben Alberts
- (United States) JC Aragone
- (Moldova) Alexander Cozbinov
- (Denmark) Mikael Torpegaard

The following player received entry into the singles main draw as a special exempt:

- (Australia) Christopher O'Connell

The following player received entry into the singles main draw using a protected ranking:

- (United States) Bradley Klahn

The following players received entry from the qualifying draw:

- (Germany) Jan Choinski
- (United States) Jared Hiltzik
- (Zimbabwe) Benjamin Lock
- (Brazil) Karue Sell

The following players received entry as lucky losers:

- (Zimbabwe) Takanyi Garanganga
- (United States) Alex Rybakov

== Champions ==
=== Singles ===
- (United States) Stefan Kozlov def. (United Kingdom) Liam Broady 3–6, 7–5, 6–4.

=== Doubles ===
- (United Kingdom) Brydan Klein / (United Kingdom) Joe Salisbury def. (Mexico) Hans Hach Verdugo / (United States) Dennis Novikov 6–3, 4–6, [10–3].
