= 2022 Las Vegas Challenger – Singles =

Singles
- 2022 Las Vegas Challenger

Final
- Champion: (United States) Tennys Sandgren
- Runner-up: (United States) Stefan Kozlov
- Score: 7–5, 6–3

Events
Singles	Doubles
← 2021 ·	Las Vegas Challenger	· 2024 →

J. J. Wolf was the defending champion but chose not to defend his title.

Tennys Sandgren won the title after defeating Stefan Kozlov 7–5, 6–3 in the final.

== Seeds ==
1. (United States) Denis Kudla (first round)
2. (United States) Steve Johnson (semifinals)
3. (Canada) Vasek Pospisil (first round)
4. (United States) Stefan Kozlov (final)
5. (Argentina) Juan Pablo Ficovich (quarterfinals, retired)
6. (United States) Ben Shelton (second round)
7. (Argentina) Facundo Mena (first round)
8. (United States) Aleksandar Kovacevic (second round)

== Draw ==
=== Key ===
- Q = Qualifier
- WC = Wild card
- LL = Lucky loser
- Alt = Alternate
- SE = Special exempt
- PR = Protected ranking
- ITF = ITF entry
- JE = Junior exempt
- w/o = Walkover
- r = Retired
- d = Defaulted
- SR = Special ranking

=== Finals ===
Semifinals
(China) Shang Juncheng	3	6^{5}
Q	(United States) Tennys Sandgren	6	7^{7}
4	(United States) Stefan Kozlov	6	1	7
2	(United States) Steve Johnson	3	6	5

Final
Q	(United States) Tennys Sandgren	7	6
4	(United States) Stefan Kozlov	5	3

=== Top half ===
First round
1	(United States) D Kudla	4	3
Q	(United States) A Perez	6	6
(China) J Shang	6	3	6
WC	(Moldova) A Cozbinov	4	6	3
(United States) E Escobedo	6	6
Q	(United States) O Kumar	1	4
(Monaco) V Vacherot	7^{7}	6^{4}	4
6	(United States) B Shelton	6^{4}	7^{7}	6
3	(Canada) V Pospisil	4	6	2
Q	(United Kingdom) J Pinnington Jones	6	3	6
Q	(United States) T Sandgren	3	7	6
(Germany) S Fanselow	6	5	3
WC	(Belgium) Maxim Verboven	2	2
(United States) B Holt	6	6
(United States) Em Nava	6^{7}	2
8	(United States) A Kovacevic	7^{9}	6

Second round
Q	(United States) A Perez	6^{3}	6	3
(China) J Shang	7^{7}	4	6
(United States) E Escobedo	6	6
6	(United States) B Shelton	2	3
Q	(United Kingdom) J Pinnington Jones	5	3
Q	(United States) T Sandgren	7	6
(United States) B Holt	7^{7}	7
8	(United States) A Kovacevic	6^{1}	5

Quarterfinals
(China) J Shang	6	3	6
(United States) E Escobedo	4	6	3
Q	(United States) T Sandgren	6^{7}	6	6
(United States) B Holt	7^{9}	2	3

Semifinals
(China) J Shang	3	6^{5}
Q	(United States) T Sandgren	6	7^{7}

=== Bottom half ===
First round
7	(Argentina) F Mena	1	6	4
(Canada) A Galarneau	6	0	6
Alt	(United States) G Nanda	7^{7}	6
(Colombia) N Mejía	6^{1}	4
Q	(United States) A Mayo	4	6^{9}
(United States) E Zhu	6	7^{11}
WC	(United States) C Kingsley	5	6	1
4	(United States) S Kozlov	7	4	6
5	(Argentina) JP Ficovich	6	7
(United Kingdom) P Jubb	3	5
(Canada) G Diallo	6	6
(France) E Couacaud	4	4
(United States) M Krueger	7	6
Q	(Republic of Ireland) S Carr	5	4
(Portugal) G Elias	7	3	5
2	(United States) S Johnson	5	6	7

Second round
(Canada) A Galarneau	6	2
Alt	(United States) G Nanda	1	1^{r}
(United States) E Zhu	6^{5}	2
4	(United States) S Kozlov	7^{7}	6
5	(Argentina) JP Ficovich	3	7^{7}	6
(Canada) G Diallo	6	6^{5}	4
(United States) M Krueger	5	3
2	(United States) S Johnson	7	6

Quarterfinals
(Canada) A Galarneau	7^{7}	4	3
4	(United States) S Kozlov	6^{5}	6	6
5	(Argentina) JP Ficovich	1	0^{r}
2	(United States) S Johnson	6	0

Semifinals
4	(United States) S Kozlov	6	1	7
2	(United States) S Johnson	3	6	5
