= 2019 Las Vegas Challenger – Singles =

Singles
- 2019 Las Vegas Challenger

Final
- Champion: (Canada) Vasek Pospisil
- Runner-up: (Australia) James Duckworth
- Score: 7–5, 6–7^{(11–13)}, 6–3

Events
| Singles | Doubles |
- Las Vegas Challenger

Thanasi Kokkinakis was the defending champion but chose not to defend his title.

Vasek Pospisil won the title after defeating James Duckworth 7–5, 6–7^{(11–13)}, 6–3 in the final.

== Seeds ==
All seeds receive a bye into the second round.

1. (United States) Steve Johnson (quarterfinals)
2. (Japan) Taro Daniel (quarterfinals)
3. (United States) Marcos Giron (quarterfinals)
4. (Slovenia) Blaž Rola (second round)
5. (Australia) James Duckworth (final)
6. (Ecuador) Emilio Gómez (third round)
7. (Canada) Peter Polansky (second round)
8. (Barbados) Darian King (second round)
9. (Spain) Nicola Kuhn (second round)
10. (Australia) Christopher O'Connell (semifinals)
11. (United States) Mitchell Krueger (third round)
12. (Kazakhstan) Dmitry Popko (third round)
13. (United States) Jack Sock (second round, retired)
14. (Chile) Alejandro Tabilo (second round, retired)
15. (United States) Donald Young (second round)
16. (United States) J. J. Wolf (second round)

== Draw ==
Key

- Q = Qualifier
- WC = Wild card
- LL = Lucky loser
- Alt = Alternate
- ITF = ITF entry
- PR = Protected ranking
- SR = Special ranking
- SE = Special exempt
- JE = Junior exempt
- JR = Junior Accelerator Programme entrant
- CO = College Accelerator Programme entrant
- NG = Next Gen Accelerator Program entrant
- w/o = Walkover
- r = Retired
- d = Defaulted

=== Finals ===
Quarterfinals
1/WC | (United States) Steve Johnson | 4 | 7^{8} | 6^{6}
(United States) Ernesto Escobedo | 6 | 6^{6} | 7^{8}
WC | (United States) Stefan Kozlov | 2 | 3
5 | (Australia) James Duckworth | 6 | 6
10 | (Australia) Christopher O'Connell | 7^{9} | 3 | 7^{8}
3 | (United States) Marcos Giron | 6^{7} | 6 | 6^{6}
(Canada) Vasek Pospisil | 6 | 6
2 | (Japan) Taro Daniel | 4 | 1

Semifinals
(United States) Ernesto Escobedo | 4 | 6^{5}
5 | (Australia) James Duckworth | 6 | 7^{7}
10 | (Australia) Christopher O'Connell | 4 | 3
(Canada) Vasek Pospisil | 6 | 6

Final
5 | (Australia) James Duckworth | 5 | 7^{13} | 3
(Canada) Vasek Pospisil | 7 | 6^{11} | 6

=== Top half ===
==== Section 1 ====
First round
(United States) JC Aragone | 7^{7} | 7
(France) L Lokoli | 6^{5} | 5
(United States) Mi Redlicki | 6 | 2 | 6
(Canada) F Peliwo | 2 | 6 | 2
Q | (United States) D Novikov | 3 | 4
(United States) E Escobedo | 6 | 6
(United Kingdom) L Glasspool | 7 | 7^{7}
(United States) Ma Redlicki | 5 | 6^{4}

Second round
1/WC | (United States) S Johnson | w/o
(United States) JC Aragone
(United States) Mi Redlicki | 6 | 7
16 | (United States) J. J. Wolf | 3 | 5
9 | (Spain) N Kuhn | 6^{8} | 6 | 1
(United States) E Escobedo | 7^{10} | 3 | 6
(United Kingdom) L Glasspool | 2 | 7^{7} | 3
6 | (Ecuador) E Gómez | 6 | 6^{2} | 6

Third round
1/WC | (United States) S Johnson | 6 | 6
(United States) Mi Redlicki | 4 | 4
(United States) E Escobedo | 7 | 3 | 6
6 | (Ecuador) E Gómez | 5 | 6 | 3

Quarterfinals
1/WC | (United States) S Johnson | 4 | 7^{8} | 6^{6}
(United States) E Escobedo | 6 | 6^{6} | 7^{8}

==== Section 2 ====
First round
WC | (United States) S Kozlov | 6 | 6
WC | (United States) Evan Song | 4 | 3
(United States) A Ritschard | 7 | 6
WC | (Moldova) A Cozbinov | 5 | 4
(Turkey) A Çelikbilek | 4 | 2
(Ecuador) R Quiroz | 6 | 6
(United States) Roy Smith | 6 | 4 | 6
(El Salvador) M Arévalo | 2 | 6 | 3

Second round
4 | (Slovenia) B Rola | 4 | 3
WC | (United States) S Kozlov | 6 | 6
(United States) A Ritschard | 6 | 5
14 | (Chile) A Tabilo | 2 | 3^{r}
12 | (Kazakhstan) D Popko | 6 | 6
(Ecuador) R Quiroz | 3 | 0
(United States) R Smith | 4 | 4
5 | (Australia) J Duckworth | 6 | 6

Third round
WC | (United States) S Kozlov | 5 | 6 | 6
(United States) A Ritschard | 7 | 4 | 1
12 | (Kazakhstan) D Popko | 3 | 4
5 | (Australia) J Duckworth | 6 | 6

Quarterfinals
WC | (United States) S Kozlov | 2 | 3
5 | (Australia) J Duckworth | 6 | 6

=== Bottom half ===
==== Section 3 ====
First round
(United Kingdom) J Draper | 5 | 6^{3}
(United Kingdom) R Peniston | 7 | 7^{7}
(Colombia) N Mejía | 4 | 6 | 6
(Brazil) T Bellucci | 6 | 1 | 3
Q | (Greece) M Pervolarakis | 6 | 6
WC | (United States) Alex Kobelt | 1 | 3
(United States) C Altamirano | 3 | 5
(United States) K King | 6 | 7

Second round
8 | (Barbados) D King | 7^{7} | 4 | 3
(United Kingdom) R Peniston | 6^{5} | 6 | 6
(Colombia) N Mejía | 3 | 2
10 | (Australia) C O'Connell | 6 | 6
13 | (United States) J Sock | 6^{7} | 0^{r}
Q | (Greece) M Pervolarakis | 7^{9} | 1
(United States) K King | 4 | 3
3 | (United States) M Giron | 6 | 6

Third round
(United Kingdom) R Peniston | 3 | 7 | 2
10 | (Australia) C O'Connell | 6 | 5 | 6
Q | (Greece) M Pervolarakis | 0 | 6^{4}
3 | (United States) M Giron | 6 | 7^{7}

Quarterfinals
10 | (Australia) C O'Connell | 7^{9} | 3 | 7^{8}
3 | (United States) M Giron | 6^{7} | 6 | 6^{6}

==== Section 4 ====
First round
(Canada) V Pospisil | 6 | 6
(United States) M Mmoh | 3 | 2
(United Kingdom) L Broady | 6 | 2 | 7^{7}
(Dominican Republic) R Cid Subervi | 3 | 6 | 6^{3}
(Ecuador) G Escobar | 6^{1} | 6 | 6
(United States) S Korda | 7^{7} | 1 | 2
(United States) S Bangoura | 6^{5} | 7^{7} | 6
(United States) E King | 7^{7} | 6^{4} | 4

Second round
7 | (Canada) P Polansky | 1 | 2
(Canada) V Pospisil | 6 | 6
(United Kingdom) L Broady | 4 | 2
11 | (United States) M Krueger | 6 | 6
15 | (United States) D Young | 6^{9} | 5
(Ecuador) G Escobar | 7^{11} | 7
(United States) S Bangoura | 4 | 6^{4}
2 | (Japan) T Daniel | 6 | 7^{7}

Third round
(Canada) V Pospisil | 6 | 6
11 | (United States) M Krueger | 4 | 1
(Ecuador) G Escobar | 3 | 3
2 | (Japan) T Daniel | 6 | 6

Quarterfinals
(Canada) V Pospisil | 6 | 6
2 | (Japan) T Daniel | 4 | 1
