= 2015 Las Vegas Challenger =

- Date: 19–25 October
- Edition: 1st
- Draw: 32S / 16D
- Prize money: $50,000
- Surface: Hard / Outdoors
- Location: Las Vegas, United States
- Venue: Frank and Vicki Fertitta Tennis Complex

Champions

Singles
- (Netherlands) Thiemo de Bakker

Doubles
- (Australia) Carsten Ball / (Germany) Dustin Brown
Las Vegas Challenger	· 2016 →

The 2015 Las Vegas Challenger was a professional tennis tournament played on hard courts. It was the first edition of the revamped tournament which was part of the 2015 ATP Challenger Tour. Challenger level events had ended in Las Vegas in the year 2000. It took place in Las Vegas, United States between 19 and 25 October 2015.

== Singles main draw entrants ==
=== Seeds ===
Country	Player	Rank^{1}	Seed
USA	Austin Krajicek	97	1
USA	Tim Smyczek	100	2
USA	Ryan Harrison	104	3
GER	Dustin Brown	110	4
SLO	Blaž Rola	136	5
USA	Jared Donaldson	144	6
NED	Thiemo de Bakker	146	7
USA	Dennis Novikov	149	8

- ^{1} Rankings are as of October 12, 2015.

=== Other entrants ===
The following players received wildcards into the singles main draw:

- (Sweden) Jakob Amilon
- (United States) Ace Matias
- (United States) Michael Mmoh
- (United States) Evan Song

The following player received entry into the singles main draw as a special exempt:

- (United States) Taylor Fritz

The following players received entry from the qualifying draw:

- (Switzerland) Henri Laaksonen
- (United States) Dennis Nevolo
- (United States) Eric Quigley
- (Colombia) Eduardo Struvay

== Champions ==
=== Singles ===
- (Netherlands) Thiemo de Bakker def. (Slovenia) Grega Žemlja, 3–6, 6–3, 6–1

=== Doubles ===
- (Australia) Carsten Ball / (Germany) Dustin Brown def. (South Africa) Dean O'Brien / (South Africa) Ruan Roelofse, 3–6, 6–3, [10–6]
