= Learner Tien =

American tennis player (born 2005)

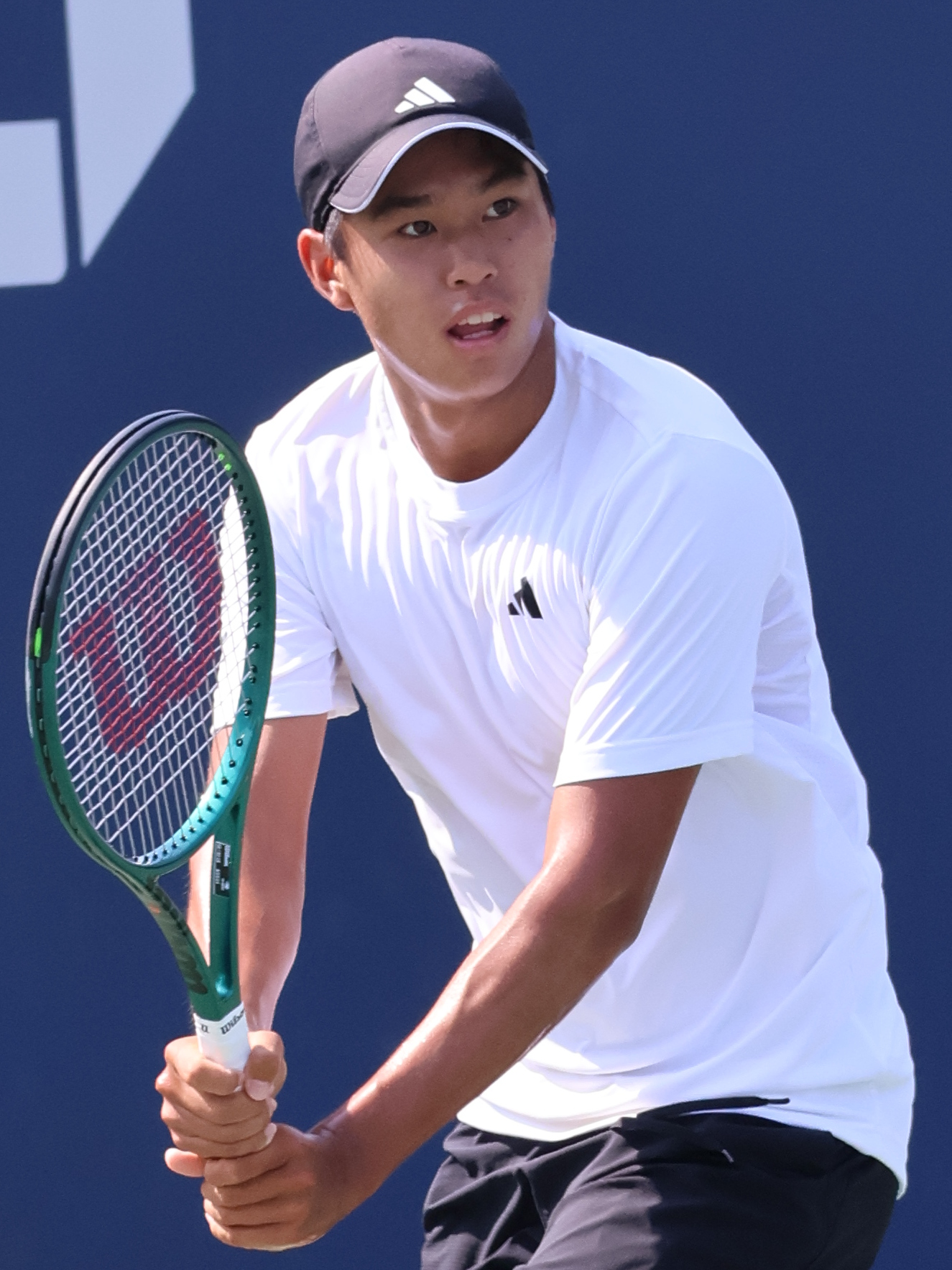
- Tien at the 2024 US Open
- Country (sports): United States
- Residence: Irvine, California, US
- Born: December 2, 2005 (age 20) Irvine, California, US
- Height: 5 ft 11 in (1.80 m)
- Turned pro: 2023
- Plays: Left-handed (two-handed backhand)
- College: University of Southern California
- Coach: Michael Chang, Erik Kortland (Jul 2025–), Eric Diaz (–2025)
- Prize money: US $5,874,440

Singles
- Career record: 75–51 (at ATP Tour level, Grand Slam level, and in Davis Cup)
- Career titles: 2
- Highest ranking: No. 12 (August 10, 2026)
- Current ranking: No. 22 (November 9, 2026)

Grand Slam singles results
- Australian Open: QF (2026)
- French Open: 3R (2026)
- Wimbledon: 2R (2025, 2026)
- US Open: 4R (2026)

Doubles
- Career record: 8–16 (at ATP Tour level, Grand Slam level, and in Davis Cup)
- Career titles: 0
- Highest ranking: No. 194 (November 2, 2026)
- Current ranking: No. 194 (November 2, 2026)

Grand Slam doubles results
- French Open: 2R (2025)
- Wimbledon: 1R (2025)
- US Open: 1R (2025)

Grand Slam mixed doubles results
- US Open: 1R (2024, 2026)
- Last updated on: November 2, 2026.

Learner Tien (born December 2, 2005) is an American professional tennis player. He has a career-high ATP singles ranking of world No. 12 achieved on August 10, 2026 and doubles ranking of No. 194 achieved on November 2, 2026. Tien has won two ATP Tour singles titles, as well as the 2025 Next Gen ATP Finals, and his best result at the majors is reaching the quarterfinals of the 2026 Australian Open. He is currently the No. 6 American singles player.

== Early life ==
Tien was born on December 2, 2005, in Irvine, California, to parents Khuong Dan Tien and Huyen Tien, Hoa refugees who fled South Vietnam to the United States. Tien is a second-generation immigrant of Chinese-Vietnamese descent.

He started taking tennis lessons in his early childhood, at a tennis facility next to his home. Tien's potential was noticeable from the start, as he won his first tournament at the Racquet Club of Irvine at the age of 5.

== Junior career ==
He reached two major finals, at the 2023 Australian Open and the 2023 US Open.

Tien had successful results on the ITF junior circuit, maintaining a 76–23 singles win-loss record. In doubles, he compiled a 36–18 win-loss record and won the 2023 Australian Open, with countryman Cooper Williams. It culminated in an ITF combined ranking of world No. 4 on February 20, 2023.

=== Junior Grand Slam singles results ===
Australian Open: F (2023)
French Open: SF (2023)
Wimbledon: QF (2022)
US Open: F (2023)

=== Junior Grand Slam doubles results ===
Australian Open: W (2023)
French Open: QF (2023)
Wimbledon: 2R (2022)
US Open: 2R (2022)

== Professional career ==
=== 2022–2023: Junior National champion, major debut ===
At 16 years old, Tien graduated high school and won the 2022 USTA Boys 18s National Championship, which earned him a wildcard into the main draw of the 2022 US Open, making him the youngest player to compete in the men’s singles main draw at the US Open since a then-16-year-old Donald Young (also the champion at Kalamazoo) played in the 2005 US Open, and also the first player aged 16 to compete since Zachary Svajda in 2019. He lost in four sets to 32nd seed Miomir Kecmanović.

In August 2023, he received another wildcard to the 2023 US Open, which was his second major appearance. He lost to fellow countryman and tenth seed Frances Tiafoe in the first round.

=== 2024: First Challenger title & ATP quarterfinal ===
In July, Tien also received a wildcard for the 2024 Cranbrook Tennis Classic in Bloomfield Hills, Michigan where he lifted his maiden Challenger title. He became the youngest American Challenger champion since 2016, when an 18-year-old Frances Tiafoe won in Granby, Canada. He also won the M15 in Lakewood, California, increasing his winning streak to 25. At the end of July, a week later, he again made the quarterfinals at the 2024 Chicago Men's Challenger and reached the top 250 in the rankings on July 29, 2024. He reached his second Challenger semifinal of the season, defeating eight seed Hong Seong-chan. He lost to Yunchaokete Bu, ending a 28-match winning streak across ITF and ATP Challenger tournaments. A week later, he also made the quarterfinals at the 2024 Lexington Challenger but lost to Hugo Grenier.

Tien secured a main draw wildcard for the US Open by winning the US Open wildcard challenge. Ranked No. 231, Tien qualified for the main draw at the 2024 Winston-Salem Open. There he defeated fellow qualifier Tristan Schoolkate and upset ninth seed Fábián Marozsán and Thiago Seyboth Wild to record his first three ATP Tour wins and reach his first ATP quarterfinal. He became the youngest American ATP tour-level quarterfinalist since Brandon Nakashima in 2020 (in Delray Beach). As a result he climbed 40 positions in the singles rankings to world No. 191 on August 26, 2024.

Tien won his second Challenger title in Las Vegas, defeating Tristan Boyer, and moved up another 40 positions in the singles rankings to a new career-high of No. 151 on September 16, 2024. He reached the top 125 in the rankings at world No. 124 on October 14, 2024, following another title at the Fairfield Challenger after playing a 39-minute final, the shortest championship match in Challenger history, against Bernard Tomic. He became the fourth American to win three ATP Challenger Tour titles before his 19th birthday after Taylor Fritz, Andy Roddick and Sam Querrey. As a result, on November 26, 2024, at 18 years old, Tien qualified for the 2024 Next Gen ATP Finals.

=== 2025: Australian Open fourth round, NextGen champion ===
Ranked No. 121, Tien made his Australian Open debut after qualifying into the main draw. He defeated Camilo Ugo Carabelli in the first round for his maiden Grand Slam win. Next, he upset fifth seed Daniil Medvedev, for his first top 10 and top 5 win, after winning the 10-point tiebreaker in the fifth set, in a 4 hours and 50 minutes match that ended at 3 am in Melbourne. At 19 years old he became the youngest American player to reach the third round of the tournament in 35 years, since Pete Sampras in 1990. Tien defeated Corentin Moutet in straight sets to reach the fourth round of a major for the first time in his career and moved into the top 100 in the singles rankings. With the win, he became the second-youngest American man to reach the fourth round at the Australian Open in the Open Era (after Sampras), and the youngest player since Rafael Nadal in 2005. His run ended with a loss to Lorenzo Sonego, in four sets.

At the Mexican Open he qualified for the main draw and defeated top seed and world No. 2 Alexander Zverev, recording his biggest win by ranking, to reach his first ATP 500-level quarterfinal. He became the youngest American man to beat a Top 3 player since 2001, when Andy Roddick, who was 18 years old at the time, defeated a No. 1-ranked Gustavo Kuerten in the third round of the Canadian Open. He was also the youngest man since 2022 to defeat a No. 3-ranked Zverev in the Madrid final, when Carlos Alcaraz, a younger 19 at the time, did it. As a result he moved into the top 70 in the singles rankings on March 3, 2025.

Tien reached the fourth round of an ATP 1000 for the first time in his career, at the Canadian Open, upsetting 22nd seed and local favorite Denis Shapovalov en route. He became the youngest American to reach the round of 16 at the Masters level since a 19-year-old Frances Tiafoe in 2017 Cincinnati.

Tien won his first ATP Tour title at the Moselle Open after defeating Cameron Norrie, reaching the top 30 at world No. 28 on November 10, 2025. He also became the first American teenager to lift an ATP trophy since Andy Roddick, in 2002.

Tien defeated Alexander Blockx to lift the 2025 Next Gen ATP Finals trophy, after having reached the final previously at the event in 2024.

=== 2026: Australian Open quarterfinal, top 15 ===
Tien began his 2026 season at the Brisbane International. He was the eighth seeded player at the tournament, but was defeated in the second round by Alex Michelsen. He then went on to play in the Australian Open, where he faced Daniil Medvedev in the fourth round, in a rematch from the previous year's Australian Open. He once again achieved an upset victory, this time defeating Medvedev in straight sets, with the second set being the first time that Medvedev has ever lost a set 6–0 at a major. With this victory, he reached his first Grand Slam tournament quarterfinal, and became the youngest man to reach an Australian Open quarterfinal since 2015. Despite losing in the quarterfinal to Zverev, this achievement placed him in the top 25 of the men's singles ranking for the first time in his career.

During the clay-court season, Tien reached the fourth round of the Italian Open in Rome, marking his best result at an ATP Masters 1000 clay event and his first time winning consecutive matches on clay at tour level. Following the tournament, he rose to a new career-high ranking of world No. 20.

Tien won his second ATP Tour title and first clay title at the Geneva Open after defeating Mariano Navone on May 23, 2026. Tien, aged 20, became the youngest Geneva champion since Marc Rosset won in 1989 at 18 years old. After the Geneva tournament, Tien ascended to a new career-high ranking of world No. 18.

== Playing style ==
Tien has demonstrated a defensive baseline play style early in his career, characterised by solid defensive retrieval, counterpunching, and astute speed and court coverage. He has a long windup on his forehand that enables him to generate height over the net and topspin, neutralising his opponent’s advantage when trying to flatten out the ball through the court. He has high fitness and consistency from the back of the court, and a dedicated point-by-point approach to wearing his opponents out with long rallies. His backhand groundstroke is comparatively flatter than his forehand; this occasionally leads to lower consistency and a few more unforced errors on that wing, but this shot of his, by contrast, is less attackable in rallies compared to his forehand which has a long windup and follow-through motion, and can be rushed by a hard-hitting opponent’s baseline power. As a left-handed tennis player, he favours both the deuce-court and ad-court exchanges with right-handed players due to his superior baseline consistency and added topspin on his forehand. However, Tien is sometimes hesitant in generating his own pace aside from cases of easily attackable balls, especially on his backhand. He is much more adept at redirecting pace from his opponents to create offensive opportunities. In general, he hits the tennis ball with great length and limits angles in exchanges from the baseline, which allows his court coverage and fitness to outlast most opponents; they may feel compelled, due to the above factors, to over-exert against his counterpunching skills.

At this stage, Tien’s strategic approach in most matches is characterised by using his superior physical fitness over many opponents, limiting unforced errors from the baseline, and occasionally using his opponent’s pace against them — on occasion, he favours the backhand down the line, and there are times when he will be more aggressive than usual. Tien and coach Michael Chang have worked to improve his all-court game and offensive skills by developing a steadily improving transition/net-approach mentality. He has employed aggressive pace-generation from the baseline, net-rushing and transitioning inside the court to take time away from his opponents more often. However, this has brought about mixed results.

The weakest aspect of Tien’s game is his serve. He hits with very generalised placement in the service box, and often without much pace — his top speed on first serve is consistently around 100-115 mph (160-185 km/h).

Tien has demonstrated a preference for hard courts, as evidenced by his recent success on the surface. He has aimed to increase the dimensionality of his game, thereby boosting his chances of having a breakout on other surfaces.

== Personal life ==
Tien's first name, Learner, is inspired by his mother's former profession — a math teacher. His sister is named Justice after their father's profession — a real estate lawyer. His parents came to the United States as Vietnamese war refugees. In an interview, his mother identified themselves as Chinese from Vietnam.

== Performance timelines ==
Key
W	F	SF	QF	#R	RR	Q#	P#	DNQ	A	Z#	PO	G	S	B	NMS	NTI	P	NH

(W) winner; (F) finalist; (SF) semifinalist; (QF) quarterfinalist; (#R) rounds 4, 3, 2, 1; (RR) round-robin stage; (Q#) qualification round; (P#) preliminary round; (DNQ) did not qualify; (A) absent; (Z#) Davis/Fed Cup Zonal Group (with number indication) or (PO) play-off; (G) gold, (S) silver or (B) bronze Olympic/Paralympic medal; (NMS) not a Masters tournament; (NTI) not a Tier I tournament; (P) postponed; (NH) not held; (SR) strike rate (events won / competed); (W–L) win–loss record.
To avoid confusion and double counting, these charts are updated at the conclusion of a tournament or when the player's participation has ended.

=== Singles ===
Tournament	2022	2023	2024	2025	2026	SR	W–L	Win %
Grand Slam tournaments
Australian Open	A	A	A	4R	QF	0 / 2	7–2	78%
French Open	A	A	A	1R	3R	0 / 2	2–2	50%
Wimbledon	A	A	A	2R	2R	0 / 2	2–2	50%
US Open	1R	1R	1R	1R	4R	0 / 5	3–5	38%
Win–Loss	0–1	0–1	0–1	4–4	10–4	0 / 11	14–11	56%
ATP 1000 tournaments
Indian Wells Open	A	Q1	A	1R	QF	0 / 2	3–2	60%
Miami Open	A	Q1	A	1R	2R	0 / 2	0–2	0%
Monte-Carlo Masters	A	A	A	A	A	0 / 0	0–0	–
Madrid Open	A	A	A	1R	2R	0 / 2	0–2	0%
Italian Open	A	A	A	2R	4R	0 / 2	3–2	60%
Canadian Open	A	A	A	4R	SF	0 / 2	7–2	78%
Cincinnati Open	A	A	A	2R	3R	0 / 2	2–2	50%
Shanghai Masters	NH	A	A	4R	3R	0 / 2	4–2	67%
Paris Masters	A	A	A	2R	2R	0 / 2	2–2	50%
Win–Loss	0–0	0–0	0–0	9–8	12–8	0 / 16	21–16	57%
Career statistics
Tournaments	1	1	2	25	13	Career total: 42		
Titles	0	0	0	1	0	Career total: 1		
Finals	0	0	0	2	0	Career total: 2		
Overall win–loss	0–1	0–1	5–4	37–24	20–12	1 / 42	62–42	60%
Year-end ranking	860	452	122	28		$5,701,461		

== ATP Tour finals ==
=== Singles: 3 (2 titles, 1 runner-up) ===
Legend ATP 500 (0–1) ATP 250 (2–0)	Finals by surface Hard (1–1) Clay (1–0)	Finals by setting Outdoor (1–1) Indoor (1–0)

Result	W–L	Date	Tournament	Tier	Surface	Opponent	Score
Loss	0–1	Sep 2025	China Open, China	ATP 500	Hard	(Italy) Jannik Sinner	2–6, 2–6
Win	1–1	Nov 2025	Moselle Open, France	ATP 250	Hard (i)	(United Kingdom) Cameron Norrie	6–3, 3–6, 7–6^{(8–6)}
Win	2–1	May 2026	Geneva Open, Switzerland	ATP 250	Clay	(Argentina) Mariano Navone	3–6, 6–3, 7–5

=== Doubles: 1 (runner-up) ===
Legend ATP 500 (0–1)	Finals by surface Hard (0–1)	Finals by setting Indoor (0–1)

Result	W–L	Date	Tournament	Tier	Surface	Partner	Opponents	Score
Loss	0–1	Oct 2026	Vienna Open, Austria	ATP 500	Hard (i)	(United States) Ryan Seggerman	(Austria) Lucas Miedler (Austria) Neil Oberleitner	1–6, 5–7

== Next Gen ATP finals ==
=== Singles: 2 (1 title, 1 runner-up) ===
Result	Date	Tournament	Surface	Opponent	Score
Loss	Dec 2024	Next Gen ATP Finals, Saudi Arabia	Hard (i)	(Brazil) João Fonseca	4–2, 3–4^{(8–10)}, 0–4, 2–4
Win	Dec 2025	Next Gen ATP Finals, Saudi Arabia	Hard (i)	(Belgium) Alexander Blockx	4–3^{(7–4)}, 4–2, 4–1

== ATP Challenger and ITF Tour finals ==
Challenger

=== Singles: 12 (10 titles, 2 runner-ups) ===
Finals by surface
Hard (10–2)

Result	W–L	Date	Tournament	Surface	Opponent	Score
Win	1–0	Jul 2024	Cranbrook Tennis Classic, US	Hard	(United States) Nishesh Basavareddy	4–6, 6–3, 6–4
Win	2–0	Sep 2024	Las Vegas Challenger, US	Hard	(United States) Tristan Boyer	7–5, 1–6, 6–3
Win	3–0	Oct 2024	Fairfield Challenger, US	Hard	(Australia) Bernard Tomic	6–0, 6–1
Loss	3–1	Nov 2024	Knoxville Challenger, US	Hard (i)	(United States) Christopher Eubanks	5–7, 6–7^{(9–11)}

World Tennis

Result	W–L	Date	Tournament	Surface	Opponent	Score
Loss	0–1	Oct 2022	M15 Fayetteville, US	Hard	(United Kingdom) Toby Samuel	3–6, 3–6
Win	1–1	Jun 2023	M15 Irvine, US	Hard	(United States) Quinn Vandecasteele	7–5, 6–2
Win	2–1	Oct 2023	M15 Norman, US	Hard (i)	(Portugal) Duarte Vale	7–6^{(8–6)}, 6–2
Win	3–1	Nov 2023	M25 Columbus, US	Hard (i)	(United Kingdom) Jacob Fearnley	2–0 ret.
Win	4–1	May 2024	M15 San Diego, US	Hard	(Brazil) Karuê Sell	6–7^{(6–8)}, 6–2, 6–2
Win	5–1	Jun 2024	M15 San Diego, US	Hard	(United States) Alafia Ayeni	6–4, 6–7^{(5–7)}, 6–4
Win	6–1	Jun 2024	M15 Rancho Santa Fe, US	Hard	(United Kingdom) Matthew Summers	6–3, 6–1
Win	7–1	Jul 2024	M15 Lakewood, US	Hard	(United States) Govind Nanda	6–3, 6–3

=== Doubles: 4 (4 titles) ===
Finals by surface
Hard (4–0)

Result	W–L	Date	Tournament	Surface	Partner	Opponents	Score
Win	1–0	Nov 2022	M15 East Lansing, US	Hard (i)	(United States) Alex Michelsen	(United Kingdom) Joshua Goodger (United Kingdom) Emile Hudd	6–4, 6–3
Win	2–0	Jun 2023	M15 Irvine, US	Hard	(United States) Bryce Nakashima	(United Kingdom) Joshua Goodger (United Kingdom) Matthew Summers	6–4, 6–2
Win	3–0	Nov 2023	M25 Austin, US	Hard	(Australia) Edward Winter	(United States) Sebastian Gorzny (United States) Brayden Michna	4–6, 6–3, [10–2]
Win	4–0	May 2024	M15 San Diego, US	Hard	(United States) Sebastian Gorzny	(France) Robin Catry (United States) Braden Shick	1–6, 6–3, [10–1]

== Junior Grand Slam finals ==
=== Singles: 2 (2 runner-ups) ===
Result	Year	Tournament	Surface	Opponent	Score
Loss	2023	Australian Open	Hard	(Belgium) Alexander Blockx	1–6, 6–2, 6–7^{(9–11)}
Loss	2023	US Open	Hard	(Brazil) João Fonseca	6–4, 4–6, 3–6

=== Doubles: 1 (title) ===
Result	Year	Tournament	Surface	Partner	Opponents	Score
Win	2023	Australian Open	Hard	(United States) Cooper Williams	(Belgium) Alexander Blockx (Brazil) João Fonseca	6–4, 6–4

== Wins against top-10 players ==
- Tien has a 8–9 record against players who were, at the time the match was played, ranked in the top 10.

Season	2025	2026	Total
Wins	5	3	8

#	Player	Rk	Event	Surface	Rd	Score	Rk	Ref
2025
1.	Daniil Medvedev	5	Australian Open, Australia	Hard	2R	6–3, 7–6^{(7–4)}, 6–7^{(8–10)}, 1–6, 7–6^{(10–7)}	121	
2.	(Germany) Alexander Zverev	2	Mexican Open, Mexico	Hard	2R	6–3, 6–4	83	
3.	(United States) Ben Shelton	10	Mallorca Championships, Spain	Grass	2R	6–4, 7–6^{(7–2)}	67	
4.	Andrey Rublev	10	Washington Open, US	Hard	2R	7–5, 6–2	67	
5.	(Italy) Lorenzo Musetti	9	China Open, China	Hard	QF	4–6, 6–3, 3–0 ret.	52	
2026
6.	(United States) Ben Shelton	8	Indian Wells Open, US	Hard	3R	7–6^{(7–3)}, 4–6, 6–3	27	
7.	(Kazakhstan) Alexander Bublik	10	Geneva Open, Switzerland	Clay	SF	6–1, 4–6, 7–6^{(7–5)}	20	
8.	(Italy) Flavio Cobolli	7	Laver Cup, United Kingdom	Hard	RR	6–3, 2–6, [10–7]	13	

- Key: (Rk) first use, opponent rank; (Rd) round; (Rk) 2nd use, player rank; (Ref) reference; (F) final; (SF) semifinal; (QF) quarterfinal; (#R) rounds 4, 3, 2, 1; (RR) round-robin stage; (Q#) qualifying rounds or stages (3), 2, 1.

== Exhibition matches ==
=== Singles ===
Result	Date	Tournament	Surface	Opponent	Score
Loss	Jan 2026	Kooyong Classic, Melbourne, Australia	Hard	(Italy) Matteo Berrettini	2–6, 2–6
Win	Jan 2026	Kooyong Classic, Melbourne, Australia	Hard	(Croatia) Marin Čilić	7–5, 4–6, [10–7]
Loss	Aug 2026	Stars of the Open, US Open Fan Week, New York, US	Hard	(Italy) Flavio Cobolli	4–6

=== Mixed doubles ===
Result	Date	Tournament	Surface	Partner	Opponents	Score
Loss	Mar 2026	Eisenhower Cup , Indian Wells, US	Hard	(United States) Amanda Anisimova	(United States) Taylor Fritz (Kazakhstan) Elena Rybakina	7–10*

* non-standard tennis sets
