= 2016 Las Vegas Challenger – Doubles =

Doubles
- 2016 Las Vegas Challenger

Final
- Champions: (United States) Brian Baker (Australia) Matt Reid
- Runners-up: (United States) Bjorn Fratangelo (United States) Denis Kudla
- Score: 6–1, 7–5

Events
Singles	Doubles
- Las Vegas Challenger

Carsten Ball and Dustin Brown were the defending champions but chose not to defend their title.

Brian Baker and Matt Reid won the title after defeating Bjorn Fratangelo and Denis Kudla 6–1, 7–5 in the final.

== Seeds ==
1. (United States) Brian Baker / (Australia) Matt Reid (champions)
2. (Australia) Sam Groth / (Canada) Peter Polansky (semifinals)
3. (Mexico) Miguel Ángel Reyes-Varela / (United States) Max Schnur (first round)
4. (South Africa) Dean O'Brien / (South Africa) Ruan Roelofse (first round)

== Draw ==
Key

- Q = Qualifier
- WC = Wild card
- LL = Lucky loser
- Alt = Alternate
- ITF = ITF entry
- PR = Protected ranking
- SR = Special ranking
- SE = Special exempt
- JE = Junior exempt
- JR = Junior Accelerator Programme entrant
- CO = College Accelerator Programme entrant
- NG = Next Gen Accelerator Program entrant
- w/o = Walkover
- r = Retired
- d = Defaulted

First round
1	(United States) B Baker (Australia) M Reid	6	6
(El Salvador) M Arévalo (United Kingdom) B Klein	2	2
(Colombia) A Falla (Colombia) E Struvay	6	6
WC	(United States) Jack Vance (United States) Jamie Vance	2	2
3	(Mexico) MÁ Reyes-Varela (United States) M Schnur	3	4
(United States) D Novikov (United States) E Quigley	6	6
(United States) A Krajicek (United States) T Sandgren	5	6	[10]
PR	(United States) JP Fruttero (China) Z Li	7	3	[4]
(United States) B Fratangelo (United States) D Kudla	6	6
WC	(United States) B Battistone (United States) D Battistone	4	0
(United States) S Bangoura (Barbados) D King	7	6
4	(South Africa) D O'Brien (South Africa) R Roelofse	5	3
(Australia) Jarryd Chaplin (New Zealand) B McLachlan	6	6
(Brazil) G Clezar (Venezuela) LD Martínez	2	1
WC	(South Africa) Ruben Alberts (Sweden) Jakob Amilon	3	2
2	(Australia) S Groth (Canada) P Polansky	6	6

Quarterfinals
1	(United States) B Baker (Australia) M Reid
(Colombia) A Falla (Colombia) E Struvay	d
(United States) D Novikov (United States) E Quigley	2	5
(United States) A Krajicek (United States) T Sandgren	6	7
(United States) B Fratangelo (United States) D Kudla	6	6^{1}	[10]
(United States) S Bangoura (Barbados) D King	3	7^{7}	[6]
(Australia) J Chaplin (New Zealand) B McLachlan	1	4
2	(Australia) S Groth (Canada) P Polansky	6	6

Semifinals
1	(United States) B Baker (Australia) M Reid	6	6
(United States) A Krajicek (United States) T Sandgren	2	4
(United States) B Fratangelo (United States) D Kudla	6	4	[10]
2	(Australia) S Groth (Canada) P Polansky	2	6	[5]

Final
1	(United States) B Baker (Australia) M Reid	6	7
(United States) B Fratangelo (United States) D Kudla	1	5
