= 2016 Las Vegas Challenger =

- Date: 17–23 October
- Edition: 2nd
- Draw: 32S / 16D
- Prize money: $50,000
- Surface: Hard / Outdoors
- Location: Las Vegas, United States
- Venue: Frank and Vicki Fertitta Tennis Complex

Champions

Singles
- (Australia) Sam Groth

Doubles
- (United States) Brian Baker / (Australia) Matt Reid
← 2015 ·	Las Vegas Challenger	· 2017 →

The 2016 Las Vegas Challenger was a professional tennis tournament played on hard courts. It was the second edition of the revamped tournament which was the part of the 2016 ATP Challenger Tour. It took place in Las Vegas, United States between 17 and 23 October 2016.

== Singles main draw entrants ==
=== Seeds ===
Country	Player	Rank^{1}	Seed
DOM	Víctor Estrella Burgos	83	1
USA	Frances Tiafoe	100	2
USA	Bjorn Fratangelo	112	3
COL	Santiago Giraldo	124	4
BAR	Darian King	130	5
USA	Denis Kudla	147	6
USA	Dennis Novikov	148	7
ARG	Marco Trungelliti	152	8

- ^{1} Rankings are as of October 10, 2016.

=== Other entrants ===
The following players received wildcards into the singles main draw:

- (Sweden) Jakob Amilon
- (Colombia) Alejandro Falla
- (United States) Evan Song
- (Denmark) Mikael Torpegaard

The following player received entry into the singles main draw as a special exempt:

- (United Kingdom) Brydan Klein

The following players received entry from the qualifying draw:

- (United Kingdom) Liam Broady
- (Italy) Salvatore Caruso
- (United Kingdom) Lloyd Glasspool
- (Spain) Roberto Ortega Olmedo

The following player entered as a lucky loser:

- (South Africa) Tucker Vorster

== Champions ==
=== Singles ===
- (Australia) Sam Groth def. (Colombia) Santiago Giraldo, 6–7^{(4–7)}, 6–4, 7–5

=== Doubles ===
- (United States) Brian Baker / (Australia) Matt Reid def. (United States) Bjorn Fratangelo / (United States) Denis Kudla, 6–1, 7–5.
