= 2018 Las Vegas Challenger =

- Date: 22–28 October
- Edition: 4th
- Draw: 32S / 16D
- Surface: Hard / Outdoors
- Location: Las Vegas, United States

Champions

Singles
- (Australia) Thanasi Kokkinakis

Doubles
- (El Salvador) Marcelo Arévalo / (Venezuela) Roberto Maytín
| ← 2017 · | Las Vegas Challenger | · 2019 → |

The 2018 Las Vegas Challenger was a professional tennis tournament played on hard courts. It was the fourth edition of the revamped tournament which was the part of the 2018 ATP Challenger Tour. It took place in Las Vegas, United States between 22 and 28 October 2018.

== Singles main draw entrants ==
=== Seeds ===
| Country | Player | Rank^{1} | Seed |
|---|---|---|---|
| RSA | Lloyd Harris | 112 | 1 |
| ESP | Adrián Menéndez Maceiras | 122 | 2 |
| NOR | Casper Ruud | 127 | 3 |
| TPE | Jason Jung | 128 | 4 |
| USA | Noah Rubin | 129 | 5 |
| ~~USA~~ | ~~Reilly Opelka~~ | ~~132~~ | ~~6~~ |
| GER | Dominik Köpfer | 175 | 7 |
| ESA | Marcelo Arévalo | 181 | 8 |

- ^{1} Rankings are as of October 15, 2018.

=== Other entrants ===
The following players received wildcards into the singles main draw:

- (Moldova) Alexander Cozbinov
- (United States) Evan Song
- (Denmark) Mikael Torpegaard
- (United States) J. J. Wolf

The following player received entry into the singles main draw as a special exempt:

- ~~(Croatia) Borna Gojo~~

The following player received entry into the singles main draw as an alternate:

- (Germany) Jan Choinski

The following players received entry from the qualifying draw:

- (France) Mathias Bourgue
- (United States) Thai-Son Kwiatkowski
- (Spain) Roberto Ortega Olmedo
- (United States) Tommy Paul

The following players received entry as lucky losers:

- (United States) Evan King
- (United States) Alexander Sarkissian
- (Netherlands) Jelle Sels

== Champions ==
=== Singles ===
- (Australia) Thanasi Kokkinakis def. (Slovenia) Blaž Rola 6–4, 6–4.

=== Doubles ===
- (El Salvador) Marcelo Arévalo / (Venezuela) Roberto Maytín def. (United States) Robert Galloway / (United States) Nathan Pasha 6–3, 6–3.
