= 2016 Las Vegas Challenger – Singles =

Singles
- 2016 Las Vegas Challenger

Final
- Champion: (Australia) Sam Groth
- Runner-up: (Colombia) Santiago Giraldo
- Score: 6–7^{(4–7)}, 6–4, 7–5

Events
Singles	Doubles
- Las Vegas Challenger

Thiemo de Bakker was the defending champion but chose not to defend his title.

Sam Groth won the title after defeating Santiago Giraldo 6–7^{(4–7)}, 6–4, 7–5 in the final.

== Seeds ==
1. (Dominican Republic) Víctor Estrella Burgos (first round)
2. (United States) Frances Tiafoe (first round)
3. (United States) Bjorn Fratangelo (second round)
4. (Colombia) Santiago Giraldo (final)
5. (Barbados) Darian King (second round)
6. (United States) Denis Kudla (first round)
7. (United States) Dennis Novikov (second round)
8. (Argentina) Marco Trungelliti (semifinals)

== Draw ==
Key

- Q = Qualifier
- WC = Wild card
- LL = Lucky loser
- Alt = Alternate
- ITF = ITF entry
- PR = Protected ranking
- SR = Special ranking
- SE = Special exempt
- JE = Junior exempt
- JR = Junior Accelerator Programme entrant
- CO = College Accelerator Programme entrant
- NG = Next Gen Accelerator Program entrant
- w/o = Walkover
- r = Retired
- d = Defaulted

=== Finals ===
Semifinals
8	(Argentina) Marco Trungelliti	5	7^{7}	6^{5}
4	(Colombia) Santiago Giraldo	7	6^{2}	7^{7}
(Australia) Sam Groth	7^{7}	6
(United States) Sekou Bangoura	6^{5}	4

Final
4	(Colombia) Santiago Giraldo	7^{7}	4	5
(Australia) Sam Groth	6^{4}	6	7

=== Top half ===
First round
1	(Dominican Republic) V Estrella Burgos	3	1
(Slovenia) G Žemlja	6	6
Q	(Italy) S Caruso	6	6
(El Salvador) M Arévalo	2	4
(United States) E Escobedo	6	6
WC	(Colombia) A Falla	4	3
(Brazil) G Clezar	6	4	4
8	(Argentina) M Trungelliti	3	6	6
4	(Colombia) S Giraldo	6	6
Q	(Spain) R Ortega Olmedo	3	2
LL	(South Africa) T Vorster	4	6^{5}
(Canada) P Polansky	6	7^{7}
(United States) T Paul	6^{5}	1^{r}
(United States) A Krajicek	7^{7}	2
WC	(Denmark) M Torpegaard	6	6
6	(United States) D Kudla	3	2

Second round
(Slovenia) G Žemlja	6	6
Q	(Italy) S Caruso	3	4
(United States) E Escobedo	5	0
8	(Argentina) M Trungelliti	7	6
4	(Colombia) S Giraldo	w/o
(Canada) P Polansky
(United States) A Krajicek	6^{6}	3
WC	(Denmark) M Torpegaard	7^{8}	6

Quarterfinals
(Slovenia) G Žemlja	6^{3}	6^{5}
8	(Argentina) M Trungelliti	7^{7}	7^{7}
4	(Colombia) S Giraldo	6^{4}	6	6
WC	(Denmark) M Torpegaard	7^{7}	3	2

Semifinals
8	(Argentina) M Trungelliti	5	7^{7}	6^{5}
4	(Colombia) S Giraldo	7	6^{2}	7^{7}

=== Bottom half ===
First round
5	(Barbados) D King	6^{5}	7	0
(Colombia) E Struvay	7^{7}	5	0^{d}
WC	(United States) Evan Song	4	4
(United States) T Sandgren	6	6
Q	(United Kingdom) L Glasspool	5	3
(Australia) S Groth	7	6
Q	(United Kingdom) L Broady	6	3	3
3	(United States) B Fratangelo	1	6	6
7	(United States) D Novikov	6	6
(Republic of Ireland) J McGee	4	1
(United States) A Sarkissian	6^{2}	0^{r}
(United States) S Bangoura	7^{7}	0
(China) Z Li	6	7^{7}
WC	(Sweden) Jakob Amilon	1	6^{5}
SE	(United Kingdom) B Klein	2	7	6
2	(United States) F Tiafoe	6	5	3

Second round
5	(Barbados) D King	4	4
(United States) T Sandgren	6	6
(Australia) S Groth	7^{7}	7
3	(United States) B Fratangelo	6^{3}	5
7	(United States) D Novikov	6^{6}	4
(United States) S Bangoura	7^{8}	6
(China) Z Li	1	6	3
SE	(United Kingdom) B Klein	6	1	6

Quarterfinals
(United States) T Sandgren	6^{2}	5
(Australia) S Groth	7^{7}	7
(United States) S Bangoura	6	3	6
SE	(United Kingdom) B Klein	4	6	4

Semifinals
(Australia) S Groth	7^{7}	6
(United States) S Bangoura	6^{5}	4
