= Cameron Lickle =

American Navy veteran, nuclear engineer, businessperson, and tennis instructor

Cameron D. Lickle
- Born: Palm Beach, Florida
- Education: United States Naval Academy
- Occupation: Tennis instructor

Cameron Lickle is an American Navy veteran, nuclear engineer, businessperson, and tennis instructor.

== Early life, education, and Naval career ==
Cameron D. Lickle was born in Palm Beach, Florida, and attended high school in Lawrenceville, New Jersey. Lickle attended the United States Naval Academy in Annapolis, Maryland where he graduated with a degree in economics. While there, he was captain of the academy's men's tennis team in 2002 and 2003. While there, he was ranked #1 in the Navy as a tennis player, and he was later inducted into the Naval Academy Sports Hall of Fame for Men's Tennis. At the academy, he was voted "captain of captains" by the other sports teams captains across the school.

He then served as a nuclear surface warfare officer in the US Navy for five years, which included two tours to the Persian Gulf as a part of both Operation Iraqi Freedom and Operation Enduring Freedom.

== Tennis instruction and sports management ==
Since 2009, Lickle has been the co-founder of Wilander on Wheels, where he and his partner Mats Wilander provide 90-minute tennis clinics that include tennis instruction from Wilander—a seven-time Grand Slam Singles Champion—and Lickle for the public. The two of them tour the US in a Winnebago trailer between locations. They also tour internationally, giving clinics in conjunction with events like the Australian Open, French Open, and Wimbledon. By 2014 the pair had given private lessons to over six thousand people. In 2017 Lickle also played an exhibition game of doubles with Martina Navratilova as his partner.

In 2018 Lickle cofounded the sports management firm WOW Sports, with the acronym standing for "Win Our Way". Through this, he has created tennis clinics for players including Jimmy Connors, Murphy Jensen, and Johan Kriek.
