= Boys' Junior National Tennis Championship =

Tennis competition

The Boys' Junior National Tennis Championship (a.k.a. the USTA Boys 18s and 16s National Championships and nicknamed Nationals at the Zoo) takes place on the Kalamazoo College campus in Kalamazoo, Michigan. This United States Tennis Association (USTA) event is one of the most important competitions for male 16- and 18-year-olds tennis players, attracting 400 to compete from across the country.

== History ==
The United States Tennis Association (USTA) is the national governing body in the United States for the sport of tennis. The USTA was originally known as the United States National Lawn Tennis Association in 1881. The name was changed first to U.S. Lawn Tennis Association, and to the present name in 1975.

The USTA has 17 different sections in different parts of the country, including: New England, Eastern, Middle States, Mid-Atlantic, Southern, Florida, Caribbean, Midwest, Northern, Missouri Valley, Texas, Southwest, Intermountain, Pacific Northwest, Northern California, Southern California, and Hawaii Pacific. Each of these sections have different regulations and procedures, but they all share the same mission statement:

The USTA is a progressive and diverse not-for-profit organization whose volunteers, professional staff, and financial resources support a single mission: to promote and develop the growth of tennis.

Each of the sections was started at a different time, as interest in the sport grew in that location. The USTA Midwest Section started in 1910 as the Western Lawn Tennis Association at the Chicago Beach Club in Chicago, Illinois. It originally controlled all of the tennis clubs west of the Alleghenies Mountains, and had great influence over the USTA at national meetings. When the USTA Midwest proposed a national clay court championship in 1910, the USTA agreed without dissent. In the 1920s, tennis became very popular in America and they started to train junior players.

Originally the tournament was held at West Side Tennis Club in Forrest Hills, New York from 1916 to 1920 and then again in 1927. It moved to Longwood Cricket Club in Boston, Massachusetts from 1921 to 1923. From 1924 to 1926 it was at South Side Tennis Club in Chicago, Illinois. Then it was at Culver Military Academy in Culver, Indiana from 1928 to 1942. Due to WWII, it was necessary to move the tournament from a military base. Dr. Allen Stowe influenced the USTA to relocate the tournament to Kalamazoo College, where he was a coach.

== Nationals at the Zoo ==
In 1943, the first "Nationals at the Zoo" ("Zoo" for Kalamazoo, Michigan) had 90 entries for the two age divisions: 18 and under and 16 and under. The event has become one of the most-important events for juniors, attracting 400 players from across the United States. The event takes place over a ten-day period from which there are winners in singles and doubles tennis. The winners from the Boys' 18 draw automatically receive a bid into the main draw of the U.S. Open Tournament.

Some of the greatest names in men's tennis have participated: Rod Laver, Barry MacKay (tennis), Stan Smith, Arthur Ashe, Jimmy Connors, John McEnroe, Aaron Krickstein, Andre Agassi, Jim Courier, Pete Sampras, James Blake, Andy Roddick, Bob and Mike Bryan, Mike Franks, Jack Sock, and Jon Douglas. Laver (1956), Smith (1964), and Sock (2010, 2011) each won the Boys' 18 singles titles. Erik Menendez played in the 1989 Nationals not two weeks before he and his brother Lyle murdered their parents. He was knocked out in the 2nd round of qualifying of the Boys' 18 singles.

Kalamazoo College's facilities include the Stowe Tennis Stadium which has eleven well-maintained hard courts outside, with seating for 3,000 spectators. The Markin Racquet Center has four indoor courts. Nearby Western Michigan University has made available their 20-court Raymond Sorensen complex for the growing tournament.

== Similar events ==
There are many events that are similar to the Junior National Tennis Championship. Girls' Championships have a similar event that takes place every year in San Diego, California for 16- and 18-year-olds. Along with having these great events in the US, there are also events all around the world. In Europe, there are tournaments for boys and girls. These events come in different age groups such as 12, 14, 16 and 18-and-under.
