= 2021 Las Vegas Challenger =

- Date: 25 – 31 October
- Edition: 6th
- Surface: Hard / Outdoors
- Location: Las Vegas, United States

Champions

Singles
- (United States) J. J. Wolf

Doubles
- (United States) William Blumberg / (United States) Max Schnur
- Las Vegas Challenger

The 2021 Las Vegas Challenger was a professional tennis tournament played on hard courts. It was the sixth edition of the revamped tournament which was the part of the 2021 ATP Challenger Tour. It took place in Las Vegas, United States between 25 and 31 October 2021.

== Singles main draw entrants ==
=== Seeds ===
Country	Player	Rank^{1}	Seed
USA	Steve Johnson	88	1
USA	Denis Kudla	91	2
USA	Tennys Sandgren	96	3
GER	Daniel Altmaier	110	4
JPN	Taro Daniel	121	5
USA	Mitchell Krueger	148	6
ECU	Emilio Gómez	151	7
TPE	Jason Jung	161	8

- ^{1} Rankings are as of October 18, 2021.

=== Other entrants ===
The following players received wildcards into the singles main draw:

- (Nigeria) Christopher Bulus
- (United States) Aleksandar Kovacevic
- (South Africa) Jordan Sauer

The following player received entry into the singles main draw as an alternate:

- (United States) Stefan Kozlov

The following players received entry from the qualifying draw:

- (Australia) Dayne Kelly
- (Japan) Shintaro Mochizuki
- (India) Mukund Sasikumar
- (United States) Donald Young

The following players received entry as lucky losers:

- (United States) Nick Chappell
- (United Kingdom) Aidan McHugh

== Champions ==
=== Singles ===
- (United States) J. J. Wolf def. (United States) Stefan Kozlov 6–4, 6–4.

=== Doubles ===
- (United States) William Blumberg / (United States) Max Schnur def. (Chinese Taipei) Jason Jung / (United States) Evan King 7–5, 6–7^{(5–7)}, [10–5].
