= Joshua Sheehy =

American tennis player (born 1997)

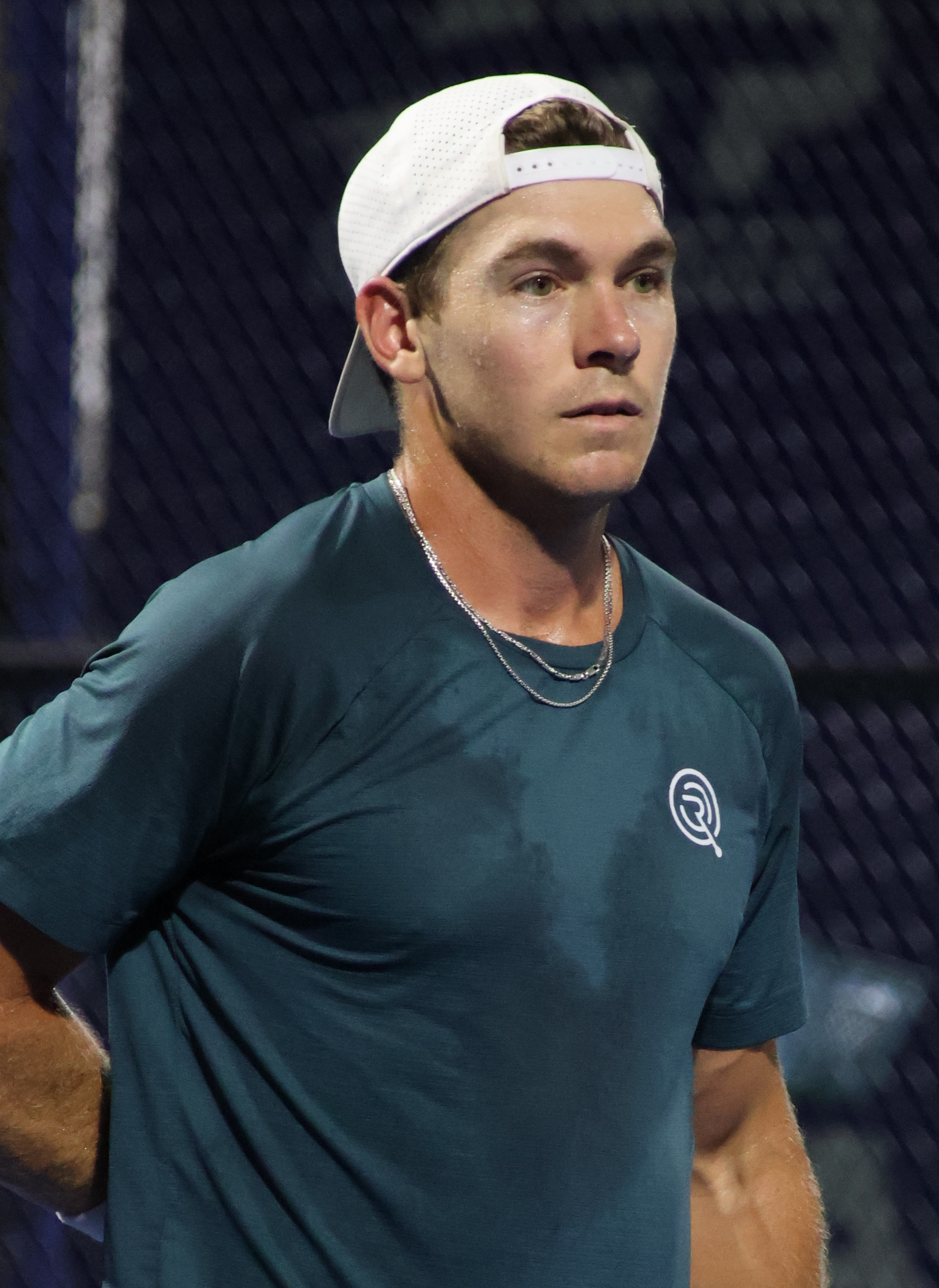
- Sheehy in 2026
- Country (sports): United States
- Born: January 28, 1997 (age 29) Arlington, Texas, United States
- Height: 6 ft 2 in (1.88 m)
- Plays: Left-handed (two-handed backhand)
- College: Abilene Christian
- Prize money: US $95,616

Singles
- Career record: 0–0 (at ATP Tour level, Grand Slam level, and in Davis Cup)
- Career titles: 1 ITF
- Highest ranking: No. 536 (February 16, 2026)
- Current ranking: No. 742 (August 31, 2026)

Doubles
- Career record: 0–0 (at ATP Tour level, Grand Slam level, and in Davis Cup)
- Career titles: 1 Challenger, 9 ITF
- Highest ranking: No. 177 (October 27, 2025)
- Current ranking: No. 186 (August 31, 2026)
- Last updated on: September 1, 2026.

Joshua Sheehy (born January 28, 1997) is an American tennis player. Sheehy has a career high ATP singles ranking of No. 536 achieved on February 16, 2026 and a career high ATP doubles ranking of No. 177 achieved on October 27, 2025.

Sheehy has won one ATP Challenger doubles title at the 2025 Las Vegas Challenger.

Sheehy played college tennis at Abilene Christian.
