= Stefan Kozlov =

American tennis player (born 1998)

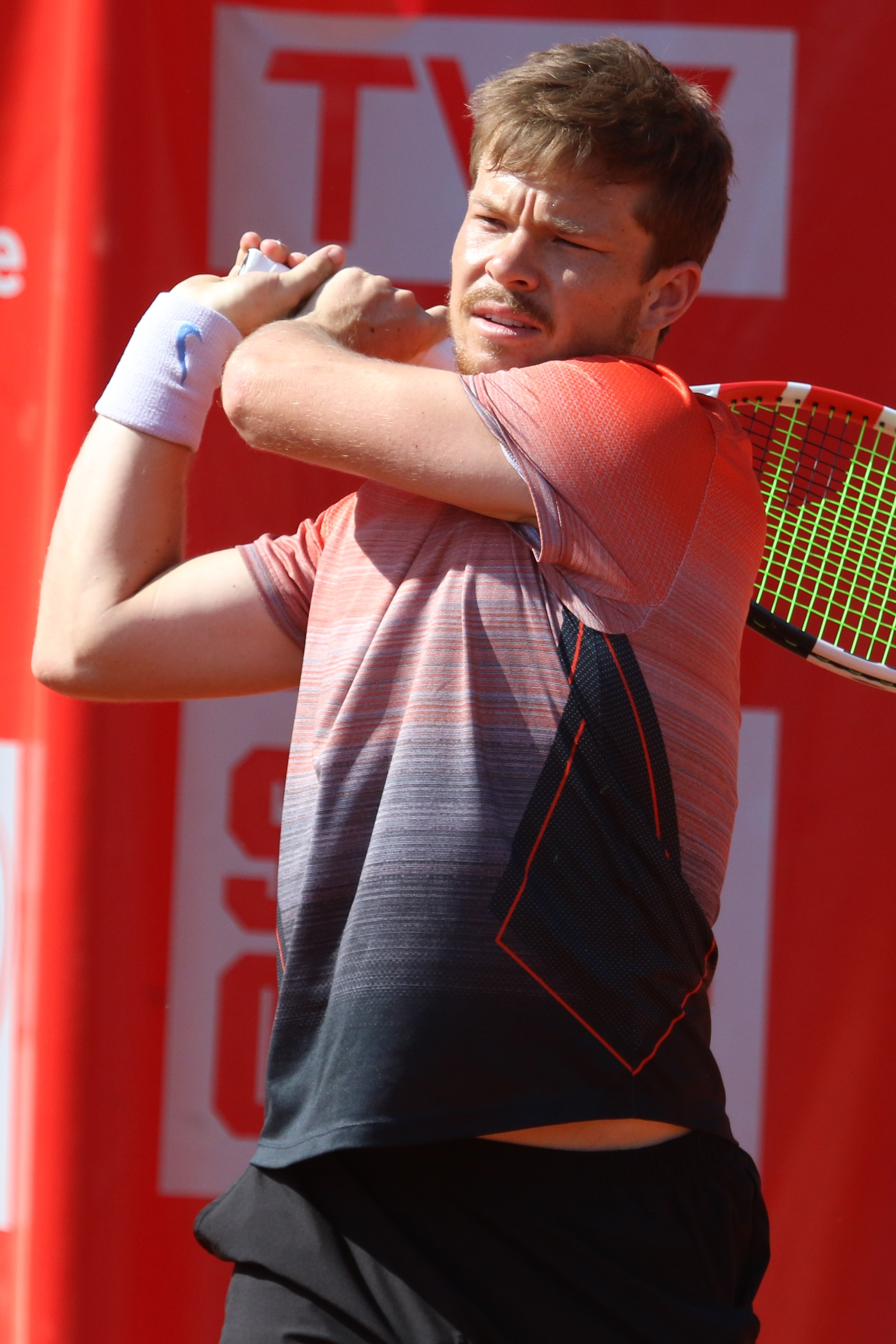
- Kozlov at the 2022 BNP Paribas Primrose Bordeaux
- Country (sports): United States
- Residence: Pembroke Pines, Florida, United States
- Born: 1 February 1998 (age 28) Skopje, Republic of Macedonia
- Height: 6 ft 0 in (1.83 m)
- Turned pro: 2013
- Plays: Right-handed (two-handed backhand)
- Coach: Andrei Kozlov
- Prize money: US $1,121,946

Singles
- Career record: 9–26
- Career titles: 0
- Highest ranking: No. 103 (July 18, 2022)
- Current ranking: No. 297 (August 31, 2026)

Grand Slam singles results
- Australian Open: 2R (2022)
- French Open: Q2 (2017)
- Wimbledon: 1R (2022)
- US Open: 1R (2022)

Doubles
- Career record: 0–5
- Career titles: 0
- Highest ranking: No. 180 (June 19, 2017)
- Current ranking: No. 693 (August 31, 2026)

Grand Slam doubles results
- US Open: 1R (2014)
- Last updated on: August 31, 2026.

Stefan Kozlov (Russian: Стефан Козлов, /ˈstɛfɑːn ˈkɒzlɒv/ STEF-ahn KOZ-lov; born February 1, 1998) is an American professional tennis player of Russian descent. He has a career-high ATP ranking of world No. 103 achieved on 18 July 2022 and doubles ranking of world No. 180 on 19 June 2017.

Kozlov made his ATP World Tour debut as a wildcard in 2013 Hall of Fame Tennis Championships at the age of 15. He reached two junior Grand Slam finals in 2014 and finished the year at World No. 3 in the ITF Junior Combined rankings.

== Personal life ==
He is the son of Russian parents and his father Andrei is a tennis coach. He has a brother, Boris, who is also a tennis player.

== Junior career ==
In 2014, Kozlov reached two junior Grand Slam finals, where he lost to Alexander Zverev at the Australian Open and Noah Rubin at Wimbledon. This success led him to a career high junior ranking of No. 2. Kozlov also competed at the U18 National Championships, finishing in third place in the singles tournament and winning the doubles tournament with Noah Rubin. With this victory, they earned a wildcard into the main draw of the 2014 US Open. He ended the year by winning the Orange Bowl junior tournament.

In 2015, Kozlov reached the final of the U18 National Championships, where he lost to Frances Tiafoe in five sets.

== Professional career ==
=== Early years ===
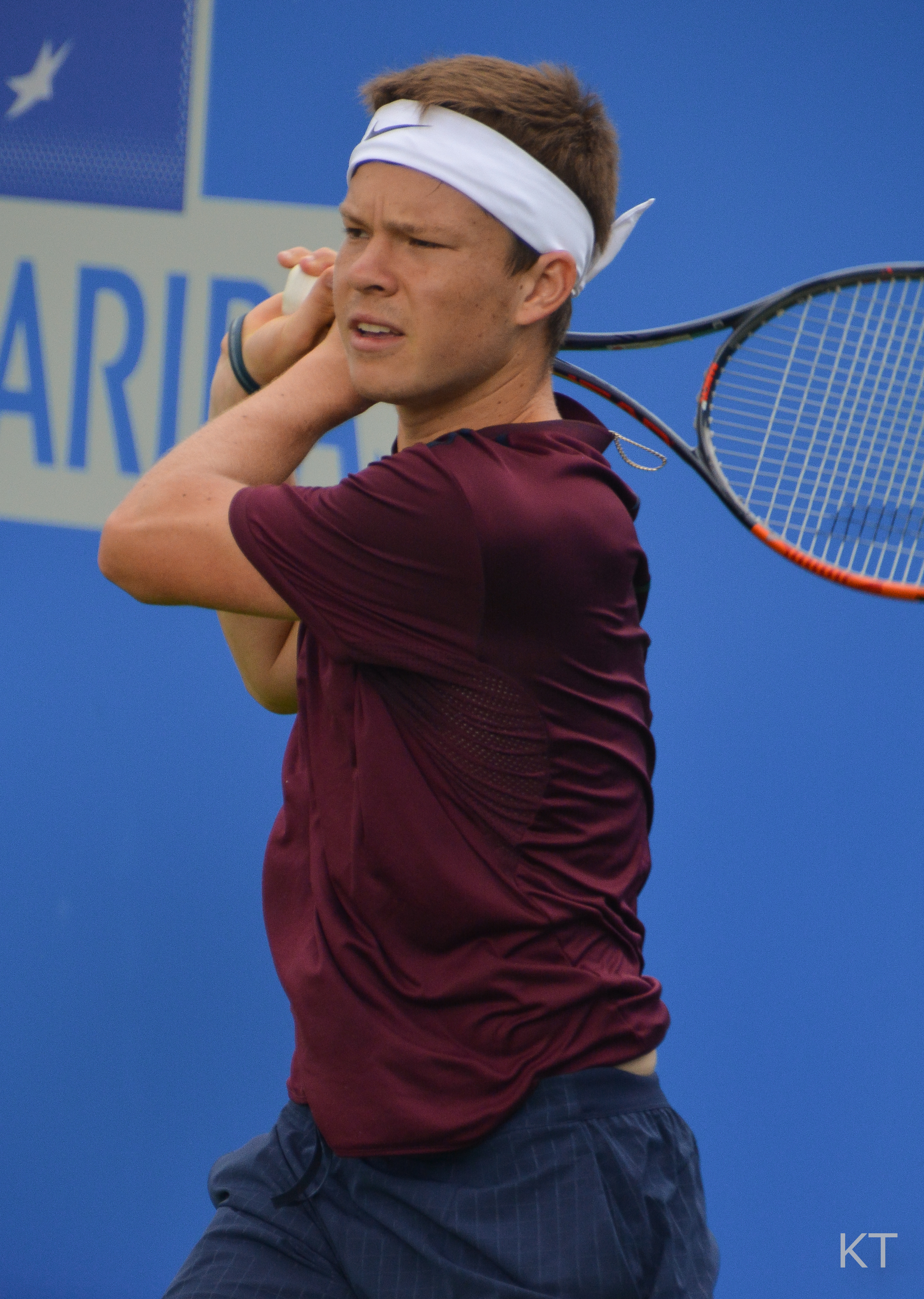
Kozlov at the 2016 Aegon Championships

In 2013, Kozlov made his ATP World Tour debut as a wildcard at the Newport tournament and lost in the first round. At the age of 16, he defeated his first Top 100 player in Tim Smyczek to reach his first ATP Challenger final in 2014 in Sacramento, where he lost to Sam Querrey. He also reached seven career ITF Futures finals and won four of these finals.

=== 2016-18: First ATP win and quarterfinal, Two Challenger titles ===
In April, Kozlov reached the final at the Open de Guadeloupe. In June, he won his first career ATP level match as a wildcard at the 2016 Ricoh Open in Den Bosch. He reached his first career quarterfinal by defeating Steve Johnson in the second round. Toward the end of the season, Kozlov reached a second Challenger final on the year at Suzhou. He won his first career Challenger event in Columbus. He won his second title at the 2017 Las Vegas Challenger.

=== 2021: First Challenger titles since 2017, back to top 200 since 2018 ===
In September, at the 2021 Columbus Challenger, Kozlov won his first title in four years, defeating Max Purcell in the final in three sets. At the same tournament he won also in doubles partnering Canadian Peter Polansky. He followed this by a final at the 2021 Las Vegas Challenger and a second Challenger title for the season at the 2021 Charlottesville Men's Pro Challenger, defeating another Australian Aleksandar Vukic. As a result, he returned to the top 200 in more than three years at No. 188 on 8 November 2021. He ended the year with winning his third Challenger in Champaign, US. As a result he finished the year ranked No. 159 on 22 November 2021 and secured a main draw wildcard into the 2022 Australian Open.

=== 2022: Major debut & first win, ATP quarterfinal & career-high ranking ===
At the 2022 Australian Open Kozlov made his debut as a wildcard and won his first Grand Slam match against Jiří Veselý. He lost in the second round to 7th seed Matteo Berrettini.

As a qualifier at the 2022 Delray Beach Open, he reached his second career quarterfinal after defeating Emilio Gómez and Steve Johnson.

Ranked No. 130 at the 2022 Abierto Mexicano Telcel in Acapulco, he reached the main draw as lucky loser and defeated Grigor Dimitrov in a stunning upset in three sets after fighting cramps, in the longest match in Acapulco history. It was the biggest win in his career.

At the 2022 Wimbledon Championships, he made his debut at this Major when he entered the main draw as a lucky loser after the late withdrawal of Borna Ćorić. Kozlov lost in straight sets to 12th seed Diego Schwartzman. He reached a new career high ranking of No. 103 on 18 July 2022.

=== 2025: First Challenger title in four years ===
Kozlov won his sixth Challenger title at the 2025 Champaign Challenger and first since 2021 when he won the title at the same event.

== ATP Challenger and ITF Tour finals ==
=== Singles: 21 (12–9) ===
Legend (singles) ATP Challenger Tour (6–5) ITF Futures Tour (5–4)	Titles by surface Hard (12–9) Clay (0–0)

Result	W–L	Date	Tournament	Tier	Surface	Opponent	Score
Loss	0–1	Oct 2014	Sacramento, USA	Challenger	Hard	(United States) Sam Querrey	3–6, 4–6
Loss	0–2	May 2015	USA F15, Orange Park	Futures	Hard	(Barbados) Darian King	2–6, 6–3, 0–6
Loss	0–3	May 2015	Mexico F3, Mexico City	Futures	Hard	(Ecuador) Iván Endara	1–6, 6–7^{(3–7)}
Loss	0–4	Oct 2015	Belarus F3, Minsk	Futures	Hard (i)	(Belarus) Dzmitry Zhyrmont	1–6, 4–6
Win	1–4	Oct 2015	Belarus F4, Minsk	Futures	Hard (i)	(Belarus) Dzmitry Zhyrmont	6–1, 7–6^{(7–1)}
Win	2–4	Jan 2016	USA F1, Los Angeles	Futures	Hard	(Canada) Philip Bester	7–6^{(9–7)}, 6–7^{(3–7)}, 6–3
Win	3–4	Mar 2016	Canada F2, Sherbrooke	Futures	Hard (i)	(United Kingdom) Lloyd Glasspool	4–6, 6–4, 6–4
Loss	3–5	Apr 2016	Le Gosier, Guadeloupe	Challenger	Hard	(Tunisia) Malek Jaziri	2–6, 4–6
Win	4–5	Apr 2016	USA F13, Little Rock	Futures	Hard	(United States) Eric Quigley	6–7^{(3–7)}, 6–3, 7–6^{(12–10)}
Loss	4–6	Oct 2016	Suzhou, China	Challenger	Hard	(Chinese Taipei) Lu Yen-hsun	0–6, 1–6
Win	5–6	Nov 2016	Columbus, USA	Challenger	Hard (i)	(United States) Tennys Sandgren	6–1, 2–6, 6–2
Win	6–6	Oct 2017	Las Vegas, USA	Challenger	Hard	(United Kingdom) Liam Broady	3–6, 7–5, 6–4
Loss	6–7	Mar 2019	M25 Calabasas, USA	WTT	Hard	(United States) Alexander Ritschard	2–6, 6–0, 6–7^{(5–7)}
Win	7–7	Sep 2021	Columbus, USA	Challenger	Hard (i)	(Australia) Max Purcell	4–6, 6–2, 6–4
Loss	7–8	Oct 2021	Las Vegas, USA	Challenger	Hard	(United States) J. J. Wolf	4–6, 4–6
Win	8–8	Nov 2021	Charlottesville, USA	Challenger	Hard (i)	(Australia) Aleksandar Vukic	6–2, 6–3
Win	9–8	Nov 2021	Champaign, USA	Challenger	Hard (i)	(Australia) Aleksandar Vukic	5–7, 6–3, 6–4
Loss	9–9	Oct 2022	Las Vegas, USA	Challenger	Hard	(United States) Tennys Sandgren	5–7, 3–6
Win	10–9	May 2025	M25 Xalapa, Mexico	WTT	Hard	(Argentina) Santiago Rodríguez Taverna	6–7^{(4–7)}, 6–4, 6–4
Win	11–9	Nov 2025	Champaign, USA	Challenger	Hard (i)	(United States) Murphy Cassone	7–6^{(7-3)}, 7-5
Win	12–9	Nov 2026	Charlottesville, USA	Challenger	Hard (i)	(United States) Aidan Mayo	7–5, 2–6, 7–6^{(7–3)}

=== Doubles: 13 (6–7) ===
Legend (doubles) ATP Challenger Tour (4–5) ITF Futures Tour (2–2)	Titles by surface Hard (5–3) Clay (1–4) Grass (0–0)

Result	W–L	Date	Tournament	Tier	Surface	Partner	Opponents	Score
Win	1–0	Nov 2013	USA F31, Bradenton	Futures	Clay	(United States) Sekou Bangoura	(United States) Devin McCarthy (Canada) Tommy Mylnikov	6–2, 6–4
Loss	1–1	May 2014	Spain F10, Vic	Futures	Clay	(United States) Noah Rubin	(Spain) Sergio Martos Gornés (Spain) Pol Toledo Bagué	2–6, 5–7
Win	2–1	Jan 2015	Maui, USA	Challenger	Hard	(United States) Jared Donaldson	(United States) Chase Buchanan (United States) Rhyne Williams	6–3, 6–4
Loss	2–2	Oct 2015	Croatia F18, Solin	Futures	Clay	(Croatia) Nino Serdarušić	(Czech Republic) Zdeněk Kolář (Czech Republic) Tomas Toman	4–6, 6–2, [6–10]
Win	3–2	Mar 2016	Canada F1, Gatineau	Futures	Hard (i)	(Japan) Kaichi Uchida	(Germany) Sebastian Fanselow (Slovakia) Adrian Sikora	7–6^{(7–5)}, 6–3
Win	4–2	Jul 2016	Winnetka, USA	Challenger	Hard	(Australia) John-Patrick Smith	(United States) Sekou Bangoura (Republic of Ireland) David O'Hare	6–3, 6–3
Loss	4–3	Sep 2016	Cary, USA	Challenger	Hard	(United States) Austin Krajicek	(Canada) Philip Bester (Canada) Peter Polansky	2–6, 2–6
Loss	4–4	Oct 2016	Ningbo, China	Challenger	Hard	(Japan) Akira Santillan	(France) Jonathan Eysseric (Ukraine) Sergiy Stakhovsky	4–6, 6–7^{(4–7)}
Loss	4–5	Apr 2017	Sarasota, USA	Challenger	Clay	(Canada) Peter Polansky	(United States) Scott Lipsky (Austria) Jürgen Melzer	2–6, 4–6
Win	5–5	Jul 2021	Lexington, USA	Challenger	Hard	(Canada) Liam Draxl	(United States) Alex Rybakov (United States) Reese Stalder	6–2, 6–7^{(5–7)}, [10–7]
Loss	5–6	Sep 2021	Cary, USA	Challenger	Hard	(Canada) Peter Polansky	(United States) William Blumberg (United States) Max Schnur	4–6, 6–1, [4–10]
Win	6–6	Sep 2021	Columbus, USA	Challenger	Hard (i)	(Canada) Peter Polansky	(United States) Andrew Lutschaunig (Japan) James Trotter	7–5, 7–6^{(7–5)}
Loss	6–7	Mar 2024	Mérida, Mexico	Challenger	Clay	(United States) Boris Kozlov	(Australia) Thomas Fancutt (United States) Hunter Reese	5–7, 3–6

== Junior Grand Slam finals ==
=== Singles: 2 (2 runner-ups) ===
Result	Year	Championship	Surface	Opponent	Score
Loss	2014	Australian Open	Hard	(Germany) Alexander Zverev	3–6, 0–6
Loss	2014	Wimbledon	Grass	(United States) Noah Rubin	6–4, 4–6, 3–6

=== Doubles: 1 (1 runner-up) ===
Result	Year	Championship	Surface	Partner	Opponents	Score
Loss	2014	Wimbledon	Grass	(Russia) Andrey Rublev	(Brazil) Orlando Luz (Brazil) Marcelo Zormann	4–6, 6–3, 6–8
