= Alex Rybakov =

American tennis player

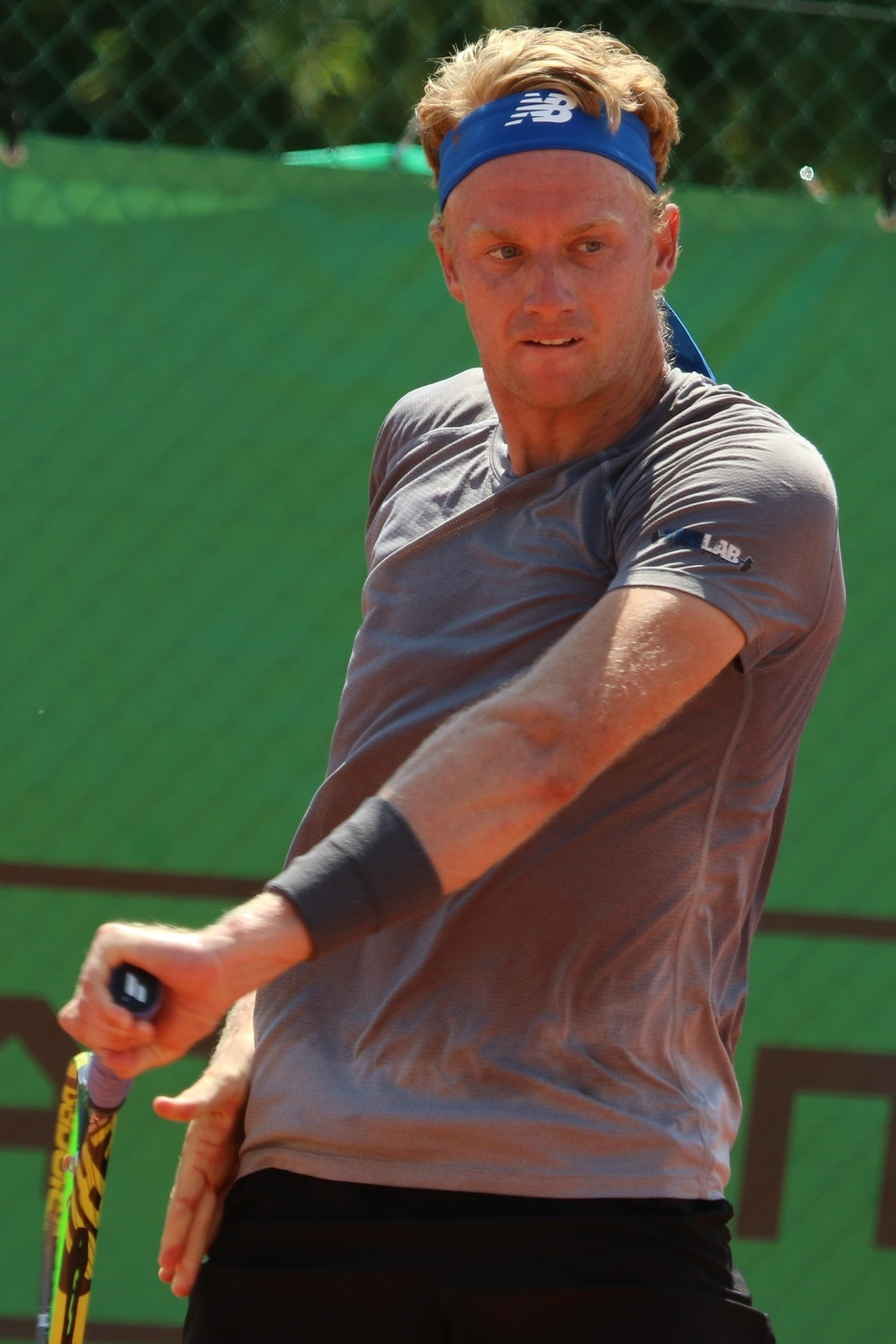
- Rybakov at the 2022 Internationaux de Tennis de Blois
- Country (sports): United States
- Born: January 27, 1997 (age 29) Plainview, New York, United States
- Height: 6 ft 1 in (1.85 m)
- Turned pro: 2019
- Plays: Left-handed (one-handed backhand)
- College: TCU
- Coach: Devin Bowen, David Roditi
- Prize money: US $255,147

Singles
- Career record: 0–1 (at ATP Tour level, Grand Slam level, and in Davis Cup)
- Career titles: 0
- Highest ranking: No. 261 (October 13, 2025)
- Current ranking: No. 478 (August 31, 2026)

Grand Slam singles results
- US Open: Q1 (2019, 2022)

Doubles
- Career record: 0–0 (at ATP Tour level, Grand Slam level, and in Davis Cup)
- Career titles: 0
- Highest ranking: No. 285 (February 19, 2024)
- Current ranking: No. 383 (August 31, 2026)
- Last updated on: September 1, 2026.

Alex Rybakov (born January 27, 1997) is an American tennis player. Rybakov has a career-high ATP singles ranking of No. 261 achieved on October 13, 2025 and a career-high ATP doubles ranking of No. 285 achieved on February 19, 2024.

He played college tennis at Texas Christian University.

== Career ==
Rybakov made his ATP main draw debut at the 2023 Dallas Open after qualifying for the singles main draw.

He also entered the 2024 U.S. Men's Clay Court Championships qualifying draw in Houston as an alternate.
