= Las Vegas Challenger =

ATP Challenger Tour
- Event name: Las Vegas Tennis Open
- Location: Las Vegas, Nevada
- Venue: Frank and Vicki Fertitta Tennis Complex (2015-2022); Darling Tennis Center (2024-present)
- Category: ATP Challenger Tour
- Surface: Hard / Outdoors
- Draw: 32S / 16D
- Prize money: $100,000 (2025), $50,000
- Website: Official website

The Las Vegas Challenger is a professional tennis tournament played on outdoor hard courts. It is currently part of the ATP Challenger Tour. It was held annually for many years through 2000 in Las Vegas, Nevada, and was brought back starting in the 2015 season.

== Past finals ==
=== Singles ===
Year	Champion	Runner-up	Score
1997	(Germany) Christian Vinck	(United States) Andre Agassi	6–2, 7–5
1998	(United States) Cecil Mamiit	(Venezuela) Maurice Ruah	7–5, 6–3
2000	(South Africa) Neville Godwin	(Italy) Cristiano Caratti	6–3, 6–3
2015	(Netherlands) Thiemo de Bakker	(Slovenia) Grega Žemlja	3–6, 6–3, 6–1
2016	(Australia) Sam Groth	(Colombia) Santiago Giraldo	6–7^{(4–7)}, 6–4, 7–5
2017	(United States) Stefan Kozlov	(United Kingdom) Liam Broady	3–6, 7–5, 6–4
2018	(Australia) Thanasi Kokkinakis	(Slovenia) Blaž Rola	6–4, 6–4
2019	(Canada) Vasek Pospisil	(Australia) James Duckworth	7–5, 6–7^{(11–13)}, 6–3
2020	Not held		
2021	(United States) J. J. Wolf	(United States) Stefan Kozlov	6–4, 6–4
2022	(United States) Tennys Sandgren	(United States) Stefan Kozlov	7–5, 6–3
2023	Not held		
2024	(United States) Learner Tien	(United States) Tristan Boyer	7–5, 1–6, 6–3
2025	(Jordan) Abdullah Shelbayh	(United States) Alex Rybakov	6–2, 6–4

=== Doubles ===
Year	Champions	Runners-up	Score
1997	(United States) David DiLucia (United States) Michael Sell	(United States) Paul Goldstein (United States) Jim Thomas	6–4, 6–4
1998	(South Africa) Marcos Ondruska (South Africa) Byron Talbot	(United States) David Di Lucia (United States) Michael Sell	7–6, 6–3
2000	(South Africa) Jeff Coetzee (South Africa) Marcos Ondruska	(United States) Mardy Fish (United States) Andy Roddick	6–7, 7–6, 6–1
2015	(Australia) Carsten Ball (Germany) Dustin Brown	(South Africa) Dean O'Brien (South Africa) Ruan Roelofse	3–6, 6–3, [10–6]
2016	(United States) Brian Baker (Australia) Matt Reid	(United States) Bjorn Fratangelo (United States) Denis Kudla	6–1, 7–5
2017	(United Kingdom) Brydan Klein (United Kingdom) Joe Salisbury	(Mexico) Hans Hach Verdugo (United States) Dennis Novikov	6–3, 4–6, [10–3]
2018	(El Salvador) Marcelo Arévalo (Venezuela) Roberto Maytín	(United States) Robert Galloway (United States) Nathan Pasha	6–3, 6–3
2019	(Philippines) Ruben Gonzales (South Africa) Ruan Roelofse	(United States) Nathan Pasha (United States) Max Schnur	2–6, 6–3, [10–8]
2020	Not held		
2021	(United States) William Blumberg (United States) Max Schnur	(Chinese Taipei) Jason Jung (United States) Evan King	7–5, 6–7^{(5–7)}, [10–5]
2022	(United Kingdom) Julian Cash (United Kingdom) Henry Patten	(Germany) Constantin Frantzen (United States) Reese Stalder	6–4, 7–6^{(7–1)}
2023	Not held		
2024	(United States) Trey Hilderbrand (United States) Alex Lawson	(United States) Tristan Boyer (United States) Tennyson Whiting	6–7^{(9–11)}, 7–5, [10–8]
2025	(United States) Benjamin Kittay (United States) Joshua Sheehy	(New Zealand) Finn Reynolds (New Zealand) James Watt	7–5, 7–6^{(7–2)}
