= 2019 JSM Challenger of Champaign–Urbana – Singles =

Urbana – Singles
- 2019 JSM Challenger of Champaign–Urbana

Final
- Champion: (United States) J. J. Wolf
- Runner-up: (United States) Sebastian Korda
- Score: 6–4, 6–7^{(3–7)}, 7–6^{(8–6)}

Events
Singles	Doubles
← 2018 ·	JSM Challenger of Champaign–Urbana	· 2021 →

Reilly Opelka was the defending champion but chose not to defend his title.

J. J. Wolf won the title after defeating Sebastian Korda 6–4, 6–7^{(3–7)}, 7–6^{(8–6)} in the final.

== Seeds ==
All seeds receive a bye into the second round.

1. (United States) Denis Kudla (second round)
2. (Slovenia) Blaž Rola (second round)
3. (Ecuador) Emilio Gómez (third round)
4. (Denmark) Mikael Torpegaard (third round)
5. (Canada) Peter Polansky (second round)
6. (United States) Christopher Eubanks (third round)
7. (Argentina) Francisco Cerúndolo (second round)
8. (Argentina) Juan Pablo Ficovich (quarterfinals)
9. (United States) J. J. Wolf (champion)
10. (Dominican Republic) Roberto Cid Subervi (third round)
11. (Japan) Kaichi Uchida (second round)
12. (Canada) Filip Peliwo (second round)
13. (United States) JC Aragone (third round)
14. (United States) Sebastian Korda (final)
15. (United States) Kevin King (second round)
16. (United States) Roy Smith (second round)

== Draw ==
=== Key ===
- Q = Qualifier
- WC = Wild card
- LL = Lucky loser
- Alt = Alternate
- SE = Special exempt
- PR = Protected ranking
- ITF = ITF entry
- JE = Junior exempt
- w/o = Walkover
- r = Retired
- d = Defaulted
- SR = Special ranking

=== Finals ===
Quarterfinals
(United States) Stefan Kozlov	2	2
9	(United States) J. J. Wolf	6	6
WC	(United States) Keegan Smith	6^{3}	3
(Slovenia) Blaž Kavčič	7^{7}	6
(United States) Martin Redlicki	2	6	6^{4}
14	(United States) Sebastian Korda	6	4	7^{7}
8	(Argentina) Juan Pablo Ficovich	5	3
WC	(United States) Alexander Brown	7	6

Semifinals
9	(United States) J. J. Wolf	6	6
(Slovenia) Blaž Kavčič	4	2
14	(United States) Sebastian Korda	6	6
WC	(United States) Alexander Brown	2	2

Final
9	(United States) J. J. Wolf	6	6^{3}	7^{8}
14	(United States) Sebastian Korda	4	7^{7}	6^{6}

=== Top half ===
==== Section 1 ====
First round
(Republic of Ireland) S Carr	2	6	6^{4}
(United States) S Kozlov	6	4	7^{7}
Q	(United States) W Blumberg	4	5
(United States) Evan Song	6	7
(Brazil) Wilson Leite	0	5
(Germany) D Altmaier	6	7
(United States) S Kirchheimer	3	7^{7}	1
(United States) B Nakashima	6	6^{4}	6

Second round
1	(United States) D Kudla	3	3
(United States) S Kozlov	6	6
(United States) E Song	6	7^{7}
15	(United States) K King	4	6^{3}
9	(United States) J. J. Wolf	6	7^{7}
(Germany) D Altmaier	2	6^{3}
(United States) B Nakashima	4	6^{5}
6	(United States) C Eubanks	6	7^{7}

Third round
(United States) S Kozlov	6	4	6
(United States) E Song	4	6	1
9	(United States) J. J. Wolf	7	4	6
6	(United States) C Eubanks	5	6	4

Quarterfinals
(United States) S Kozlov	2	2
9	(United States) J. J. Wolf	6	6

==== Section 2 ====
First round
(Dominican Republic) N Hardt	0	1
WC	(United States) Z Svajda	6	6
WC	(United States) K Smith	6	6
(Argentina) M Peña López	2	1
(United Kingdom) L Glasspool	3	6	6
(Belgium) M Geerts	6	3	2
(United Kingdom) R Peniston	4	3
(Slovenia) B Kavčič	6	6

Second round
4	(Denmark) M Torpegaard	6	6
WC	(United States) Z Svajda	1	2
WC	(United States) K Smith	3	6	7^{7}
16	(United States) Roy Smith	6	3	6^{3}
11	(Japan) K Uchida	5	6^{5}
(United Kingdom) L Glasspool	7	7^{7}
(Slovenia) B Kavčič	6	6
7	(Argentina) F Cerúndolo	2	0

Third round
4	(Denmark) M Torpegaard	0	3
WC	(United States) K Smith	6	6
(United Kingdom) L Glasspool	5	6^{5}
(Slovenia) B Kavčič	7	7^{7}

Quarterfinals
WC	(United States) K Smith	6^{3}	3
(Slovenia) B Kavčič	7^{7}	6

=== Bottom half ===
==== Section 3 ====
First round
(United States) Ma Redlicki	6	6
Q	(United States) Ezekiel Clark	3	2
(United States) Felix Corwin	4	6	6
(Colombia) N Mejía	6	4	1
(Greece) M Pervolarakis	6	3	2
(Canada) B Sigouin	3	6	6
(Germany) Lucas Gerch	7^{7}	6
(Netherlands) G Brouwer	6^{4}	2

Second round
5	(Canada) P Polansky	6	1	4
(United States) Ma Redlicki	4	6	6
(United States) F Corwin	6	6
12	(Canada) F Peliwo	3	4
14	(United States) S Korda	6	6
(Canada) B Sigouin	1	3
(Germany) L Gerch	4	7^{7}	2
3	(Ecuador) E Gómez	6	6^{5}	6

Third round
(United States) Ma Redlicki	6	7
(United States) F Corwin	4	5
14	(United States) S Korda	4	6	6
3	(Ecuador) E Gómez	6	4	3

Quarterfinals
(United States) Ma Redlicki	2	6	6^{4}
14	(United States) S Korda	6	4	7^{7}

==== Section 4 ====
First round
(United Kingdom) E Hoyt	4	2
WC	(United States) A Kovacevic	6	6
(South Africa) R Roelofse	7^{7}	6
WC	(United States) Austin Rapp	6^{4}	3
(Russia) A Avidzba	3	1
(Netherlands) J Sels	6	6
WC	(United States) Alexander Brown	7	6
(Hungary) M Valkusz	5	4

Second round
8	(Argentina) JP Ficovich	7^{8}	6
WC	(United States) A Kovacevic	6^{6}	1
(South Africa) R Roelofse	7	3	3
10	(Dominican Republic) R Cid Subervi	5	6	6
13	(United States) JC Aragone	6	3	6
(Netherlands) J Sels	2	6	3
WC	(United States) A Brown	6^{6}	6	6
2	(Slovenia) B Rola	7^{8}	3	4

Third round
8	(Argentina) JP Ficovich	6	7^{8}
10	(Dominican Republic) R Cid Subervi	4	6^{6}
13	(United States) JC Aragone	6^{5}	3
WC	(United States) A Brown	7^{7}	6

Quarterfinals
8	(Argentina) JP Ficovich	5	3
WC	(United States) A Brown	7	6
