= 2019 Kentucky Bank Tennis Championships – Men's singles =

Men's singles
- 2019 Kentucky Bank Tennis Championships

Final
- Champion: (Italy) Jannik Sinner
- Runner-up: (Australia) Alex Bolt
- Score: 6–4, 3–6, 6–4

Events
Singles	men	women
Doubles	men	women
- Kentucky Bank Tennis Championships

Lloyd Harris was the defending champion but chose not to defend his title.

Jannik Sinner won the title after defeating Alex Bolt 6–4, 3–6, 6–4 in the final.

== Seeds ==
All seeds receive a bye into the second round.

1. (Canada) Peter Polansky (second round)
2. (Australia) Alex Bolt (final)
3. (Italy) Jannik Sinner (champion)
4. (Australia) Andrew Harris (second round)
5. (South Korea) Lee Duck-hee (quarterfinals)
6. (Japan) Yosuke Watanuki (withdrew)
7. (Australia) Akira Santillan (quarterfinals)
8. (Japan) Kaichi Uchida (second round)
9. (Australia) Maverick Banes (third round)
10. (United States) J. J. Wolf (withdrew)
11. (Australia) Aleksandar Vukic (second round)
12. (Russia) Evgeny Karlovskiy (third round)
13. (United States) JC Aragone (semifinals)
14. (United Kingdom) Liam Broady (quarterfinals)
15. (United States) Collin Altamirano (second round)
16. (United States) Maxime Cressy (third round)

== Draw ==
Key

- Q = Qualifier
- WC = Wild card
- LL = Lucky loser
- Alt = Alternate
- ITF = ITF entry
- PR = Protected ranking
- SR = Special ranking
- SE = Special exempt
- JE = Junior exempt
- JR = Junior Accelerator Programme entrant
- CO = College Accelerator Programme entrant
- NG = Next Gen Accelerator Program entrant
- w/o = Walkover
- r = Retired
- d = Defaulted

=== Finals ===
Quarterfinals
13	(United States) JC Aragone	7^{7}	7^{7}
7	(Australia) Akira Santillan	6^{4}	6^{3}
3	(Italy) Jannik Sinner	4	6	6
5	(South Korea) Lee Duck-hee	6	3	1
(United Kingdom) Lloyd Glasspool	6	6
14	(United Kingdom) Liam Broady	4	3
(United States) Alexander Ritschard	4	7^{7}	4
2	(Australia) Alex Bolt	6	6^{2}	6

Semifinals
13	(United States) JC Aragone	2	4
3	(Italy) Jannik Sinner	6	6
(United Kingdom) Lloyd Glasspool	3	2
2	(Australia) Alex Bolt	6	6

Final
3	(Italy) Jannik Sinner	6	3	6
2	(Australia) Alex Bolt	4	6	4

=== Top half ===
==== Section 1 ====
First round
(Canada) B Sigouin	6	6
WC	(United States) Ronald Hohmann	1	4
ITF	(Greece) M Pervolarakis	3	2
(United States) S Korda	6	6
(Russia) T Gabashvili	6	3	1
(Croatia) B Gojo	4	6	6
(United States) R Shane	3	6	3
Q	(United States) V Kirkov	6	1	6

Second round
1/SE	(Canada) P Polansky	4	4
(Canada) B Sigouin	6	6
(United States) S Korda	6^{6}	4
13	(United States) JC Aragone	7^{8}	6
11	(Australia) A Vukic	4	3
(Croatia) B Gojo	6	6
Q	(United States) V Kirkov	4	3
7	(Australia) A Santillan	6	6

Third round
(Canada) B Sigouin	3	2
13	(United States) JC Aragone	6	6
(Croatia) B Gojo	6^{3}	6	2
7	(Australia) A Santillan	7^{7}	4	6

Quarterfinals
13	(United States) JC Aragone	7^{7}	7^{7}
7	(Australia) A Santillan	6^{4}	6^{3}

==== Section 2 ====
First round
Alt	(Russia) A Zakharov	6	6
(Zimbabwe) T Garanganga	1	2
ITF	(United Kingdom) E Hoyt	6	6^{3}	6
(United States) A Rybakov	2	7^{7}	2
(United States) R Sarmiento	7^{7}	6
(United States) Ma Redlicki	6^{3}	1
(Netherlands) T van Rijthoven	2	6^{9}
WC	(United States) N Moreno de Alboran	6	7^{11}

Second round
3	(Italy) J Sinner	4	6	6
Alt	(Russia) A Zakharov	6	1	3
ITF	(United Kingdom) E Hoyt	4	7^{7}	1
16	(United States) M Cressy	6	6^{5}	6
12	(Russia) E Karlovskiy	7^{7}	6
(United States) R Sarmiento	6^{5}	3
WC	(United States) N Moreno de Alboran	2	3
5	(South Korea) D-h Lee	6	6

Third round
3	(Italy) J Sinner	6	6^{10}	6
16	(United States) M Cressy	4	7^{12}	1
12	(Russia) E Karlovskiy	6	2	4
5	(South Korea) D-h Lee	4	6	6

Quarterfinals
3	(Italy) J Sinner	4	6	6
5	(South Korea) D-h Lee	6	3	1

=== Bottom half ===
==== Section 3 ====
First round
WC	(United States) TA Kodat	1	4
(United Kingdom) L Glasspool	6	6
WC	(France) Enzo Wallart	6	6
(United States) O Crawford	4	3
(United States) S Bangoura	4	6	6
ITF	(United States) S Kirchheimer	6	1	4
ITF	(Ecuador) D Hidalgo	6	6
WC	(United States) Ezekiel Clark	3	2

Second round
8	(Japan) K Uchida	4	3
(United Kingdom) L Glasspool	6	6
WC	(France) E Wallart	2	3
Alt	(Netherlands) S Verbeek	6	6
14	(United Kingdom) L Broady	1	7^{7}	6
(United States) S Bangoura	6	6^{4}	2
ITF	(Ecuador) D Hidalgo	6	7^{10}
4	(Australia) A Harris	4	6^{8}

Third round
(United Kingdom) L Glasspool	6	6
Alt	(Netherlands) S Verbeek	4	3
14	(United Kingdom) L Broady	4	6	6
ITF	(Ecuador) D Hidalgo	6	4	3

Quarterfinals
(United Kingdom) L Glasspool	6	6
14	(United Kingdom) L Broady	4	3

==== Section 4 ====
First round
(Canada) Pavel Krainik	1	1
(United States) A Ritschard	6	6
(United States) J McNally	7^{7}	3	6
ITF	(Northern Mariana Islands) C Sinclair	6^{3}	6	1
(United States) Roy Smith	7^{8}	7^{7}
(Israel) E Leshem	6^{6}	6^{3}
Q	(United States) K Smith	4	6^{2}
(Canada) L Draxl	6	7^{7}

Second round
LL	(United States) Alexander Lebedev	6	2	3
(United States) A Ritschard	4	6	6
(United States) J McNally	6^{5}	6	1
9	(Australia) M Banes	7^{7}	3	6
15	(United States) C Altamirano	4	7^{7}	2
(United States) R Smith	6	6^{5}	6
(Canada) L Draxl	6	5	2
2	(Australia) A Bolt	1	7	6

Third round
(United States) A Ritschard	6	6
9	(Australia) M Banes	4	2
(United States) R Smith	6	3	4
2	(Australia) A Bolt	3	6	6

Quarterfinals
(United States) A Ritschard	4	7^{7}	4
2	(Australia) A Bolt	6	6^{2}	6
