= 2021 JSM Challenger of Champaign–Urbana – Singles =

Urbana – Singles
- 2021 JSM Challenger of Champaign–Urbana

Final
- Champion: (United States) Stefan Kozlov
- Runner-up: (Australia) Aleksandar Vukic
- Score: 5–7, 6–3, 6–4

Events
Singles	Doubles
← 2019 ·	JSM Challenger of Champaign–Urbana	· 2022 →

J. J. Wolf was the defending champion but lost in the semifinals to Stefan Kozlov.

Kozlov won the title after defeating Aleksandar Vukic 5–7, 6–3, 6–4 in the final.

== Seeds ==
1. (Germany) Daniel Altmaier (second round)
2. (United States) Mitchell Krueger (quarterfinals)
3. (United States) J. J. Wolf (semifinals)
4. (Australia) Aleksandar Vukic (final)
5. (Chinese Taipei) Jason Jung (second round)
6. (India) Prajnesh Gunneswaran (first round)
7. (Slovenia) Blaž Rola (first round)
8. (United States) Stefan Kozlov (champion)

== Draw ==
=== Key ===
- Q = Qualifier
- WC = Wild card
- LL = Lucky loser
- Alt = Alternate
- ITF = ITF entry
- PR = Protected ranking
- SR = Special ranking
- SE = Special exempt
- JE = Junior exempt
- JR = Junior Accelerator Programme entrant
- CO = College Accelerator Programme entrant
- NG = Next Gen Accelerator Program entrant
- w/o = Walkover
- r = Retired
- d = Defaulted

=== Finals ===
Semifinals
(Japan) Yosuke Watanuki	6^{8}	4
4	(Australia) Aleksandar Vukic	7^{10}	6
3	(United States) J. J. Wolf	2	3
8	(United States) Stefan Kozlov	6	6

Final
4	(Australia) Aleksandar Vukic	7	3	4
8	(United States) Stefan Kozlov	5	6	6

=== Top half ===
First round
1	(Germany) D Altmaier	6	6
(Tunisia) M Jaziri	3	4
(Canada) A Galarneau	4	6	0
(Japan) Yo Watanuki	6	4	6
(Serbia) P Krstin	7	7
Q	(India) A Kadhe	5	5
Q	(United States) B Shelton	3	6	6
7	(Slovenia) B Rola	6	4	4
4	(Australia) A Vukic	6	6
(Chinese Taipei) T-l Wu	3	3
WC	(United States) A Kovacevic	5	6	6^{5}
Q	(Netherlands) G Brouwer	7	3	7^{7}
(Japan) G Soeda	6	6
(United States) T-S Kwiatkowski	1	4
(Denmark) M Torpegaard	2	6	4
5	(Chinese Taipei) J Jung	6	3	6

Second round
1	(Germany) D Altmaier	2	1
(Japan) Yo Watanuki	6	6
(Serbia) P Krstin	6	0	1
Q	(United States) B Shelton	4	6	6
4	(Australia) A Vukic	6	6
Q	(Netherlands) G Brouwer	4	4
(Japan) G Soeda	6	5	6
5	(Chinese Taipei) J Jung	4	7	4

Quarterfinals
(Japan) Yo Watanuki	6	6
Q	(United States) B Shelton	2	1
4	(Australia) A Vukic	6	6
(Japan) G Soeda	2	2

Semifinals
(Japan) Yo Watanuki	6^{8}	4
4	(Australia) A Vukic	7^{10}	6

=== Bottom half ===
First round
6	(India) P Gunneswaran	5	1
WC	(United States) V Kirkov	7	6
(United States) Em Nava	3	6^{5}
(United States) N Chappell	6	7^{7}
(Japan) K Uchida	6	3
(Japan) Y Uchiyama	4	1^{r}
(Japan) T Ito	3	6	3
3	(United States) J. J. Wolf	6	3	6
8	(United States) S Kozlov	3	6	6
(United States) JC Aragone	6	3	4
Q	(United States) K Smith	5
(United States) M Mmoh	3^{r}
WC	(United States) Ezekiel Clark	6	3	3
(United States) C Harrison	4	6	6
(Colombia) N Mejía	3	3
2	(United States) M Krueger	6	6

Second round
WC	(United States) V Kirkov	6	6
(United States) N Chappell	2	3
(Japan) K Uchida	3	4
3	(United States) J. J. Wolf	6	6
8	(United States) S Kozlov	6	6
Q	(United States) K Smith	3	1
(United States) C Harrison	3	6	4
2	(United States) M Krueger	6	1	6

Quarterfinals
WC	(United States) V Kirkov	3	2
3	(United States) J. J. Wolf	6	6
8	(United States) S Kozlov	6	6
2	(United States) M Krueger	4	4

Semifinals
3	(United States) J. J. Wolf	2	3
8	(United States) S Kozlov	6	6
