= 2019 Columbus Challenger III – Singles =

Singles
- 2019 Columbus Challenger III

Final
- Champion: (Canada) Peter Polansky
- Runner-up: (United States) J. J. Wolf
- Score: 6–3, 7–6^{(7–4)}

Events
Singles	Doubles
- Columbus Challenger

Mikael Torpegaard was the defending champion but lost in the quarterfinals to Roberto Quiroz.

Peter Polansky won the title after defeating J. J. Wolf 6–3, 7–6^{(7–4)} in the final.

== Seeds ==
All seeds receive a bye into the second round.

1. (Ecuador) Emilio Gómez (semifinals)
2. (Denmark) Mikael Torpegaard (quarterfinals)
3. (United States) Michael Mmoh (third round)
4. (Canada) Peter Polansky (champion)
5. (United States) Thai-Son Kwiatkowski (quarterfinals)
6. (France) Enzo Couacaud (quarterfinals)
7. (United States) Maxime Cressy (second round)
8. (United States) Donald Young (third round)
9. (Ecuador) Roberto Quiroz (semifinals)
10. (United Kingdom) Liam Broady (third round)
11. (Argentina) Renzo Olivo (second round)
12. (Dominican Republic) Roberto Cid Subervi (second round)
13. (United States) J. J. Wolf (final)
14. (Canada) Filip Peliwo (third round)
15. (United States) Roy Smith (third round)
16. (United States) Michael Redlicki (second round)

== Draw ==
Key

- Q = Qualifier
- WC = Wild card
- LL = Lucky loser
- Alt = Alternate
- ITF = ITF entry
- PR = Protected ranking
- SR = Special ranking
- SE = Special exempt
- JE = Junior exempt
- JR = Junior Accelerator Programme entrant
- CO = College Accelerator Programme entrant
- NG = Next Gen Accelerator Program entrant
- w/o = Walkover
- r = Retired
- d = Defaulted

=== Finals ===
Quarterfinals
1	(Ecuador) Emilio Gómez	7	7^{7}
6	(France) Enzo Couacaud	5	6^{4}
13	(United States) J. J. Wolf	4	6	6
(France) Gabriel Petit	6	4	1
5	(United States) Thai-Son Kwiatkowski	4	6	6^{7}
4	(Canada) Peter Polansky	6	0	7^{9}
9	(Ecuador) Roberto Quiroz	7^{7}	7^{7}
2	(Denmark) Mikael Torpegaard	6^{5}	6^{4}

Semifinals
1	(Ecuador) Emilio Gómez	2	6^{5}
13	(United States) J. J. Wolf	6	7^{7}
4	(Canada) Peter Polansky	7^{9}	7^{7}
9	(Ecuador) Roberto Quiroz	6^{7}	6^{4}

Final
13	(United States) J. J. Wolf	3	6^{4}
4	(Canada) Peter Polansky	6	7^{7}

=== Top half ===
==== Section 1 ====
First round
Q	(United States) Ezekiel Clark	4	6	6^{8}
(Israel) B Patael	6	4	7^{10}
WC	(Canada) J Boulais	7^{7}	7^{8}
(United States) Jordi Arconada	6^{4}	6^{6}
(United States) E Zhu	4	7	6^{4}
(United States) Ma Redlicki	6	5	7^{7}
WC	(United States) R Cash	3	4
(United States) S Kirchheimer	6	6

Second round
1	(Ecuador) E Gómez	6	7^{7}
(Israel) B Patael	3	6^{4}
WC	(Canada) J Boulais	6^{4}	1
14	(Canada) F Peliwo	7^{7}	6
10	(United Kingdom) L Broady	7^{7}	6
(United States) Ma Redlicki	6^{2}	2
(United States) S Kirchheimer	6	5	0
6	(France) E Couacaud	2	7	6

Third round
1	(Ecuador) E Gómez	7^{7}	6
14	(Canada) F Peliwo	6^{2}	4
10	(United Kingdom) L Broady	4	2
6	(France) E Couacaud	6	6

Quarterfinals
1	(Ecuador) E Gómez	7	7^{7}
6	(France) E Couacaud	5	6^{4}

==== Section 2 ====
First round
(Israel) E Leshem	6	6
(United Kingdom) R Peniston	1	3
(Ecuador) D Hidalgo	6^{9}	1
WC	(United States) Kyle Seelig	7^{11}	6
(United States) Felix Corwin	7	3	1
(United States) A Ritschard	5	6	6
(United States) D Nguyen	6^{3}	6	4
(France) Gabriel Petit	7^{7}	3	6

Second round
3	(United States) M Mmoh	7	7^{7}
(Israel) E Leshem	5	6^{5}
WC	(United States) K Seelig	3	2
13	(United States) J. J. Wolf	6	6
12	(Dominican Republic) R Cid Subervi	4	1
(United States) A Ritschard	6	6
(France) G Petit	7^{7}	7^{7}
7	(United States) M Cressy	6^{5}	6^{1}

Third round
3	(United States) M Mmoh	2	2
13	(United States) J. J. Wolf	6	6
(United States) A Ritschard	4	6	4
(France) G Petit	6	3	6

Quarterfinals
13	(United States) J. J. Wolf	4	6	6
(France) G Petit	6	4	1

=== Bottom half ===
==== Section 3 ====
First round
(United States) Evan Song	4	6	2
WC	(United States) C Kingsley	6	2	6
(United States) Gage Brymer	4	1
Alt	(Canada) B Sigouin	6	6
Q	(United States) Jacob Dunbar	5	4
(United States) R Shane	7	6
(United States) D Novikov	6^{4}	6^{3}
(United States) S Bangoura	7^{7}	7^{7}

Second round
5	(United States) T-S Kwiatkowski	3	6	6
WC	(United States) C Kingsley	6	4	3
Alt	(Canada) B Sigouin	6	6
11	(Argentina) R Olivo	1	2
15	(United States) Roy Smith	4	6	6
(United States) R Shane	6	4	4
(United States) S Bangoura	6^{5}	3
4	(Canada) P Polansky	7^{7}	6

Third round
5	(United States) T-S Kwiatkowski	6	6
Alt	(Canada) B Sigouin	2	4
15	(United States) R Smith	4	4
4	(Canada) P Polansky	6	6

Quarterfinals
5	(United States) T-S Kwiatkowski	4	6	6^{7}
4	(Canada) P Polansky	6	0	7^{9}

==== Section 4 ====
First round
(Ecuador) G Escobar	6	4	7
(United States) Maksim Tikhomirov	1	6	5
(Spain) C Gómez-Herrera	4	2
WC	(Japan) J Trotter	6	6
(United States) J McNally	4	4
(Belgium) M Geerts	6	6
(Northern Mariana Islands) C Sinclair	5	6^{9}
(Austria) A Erler	7	7^{11}

Second round
8	(United States) D Young	6	6^{4}	6
(Ecuador) G Escobar	2	7^{7}	1
WC	(Japan) J Trotter	4	2
9	(Ecuador) R Quiroz	6	6
16	(United States) Mi Redlicki	5	4
(Belgium) M Geerts	7	6
(Austria) A Erler	2	7^{7}	1
2	(Denmark) M Torpegaard	6	6^{1}	6

Third round
8	(United States) D Young	7	4	4
9	(Ecuador) R Quiroz	5	6	6
(Belgium) M Geerts	3	6^{2}
2	(Denmark) M Torpegaard	6	7^{7}

Quarterfinals
9	(Ecuador) R Quiroz	7^{7}	7^{7}
2	(Denmark) M Torpegaard	6^{5}	6^{4}
