= 2020 Columbus Challenger – Doubles =

Doubles
- 2020 Columbus Challenger

Final
- Champions: (Philippines) Treat Huey (United States) Nathaniel Lammons
- Runners-up: (United Kingdom) Lloyd Glasspool (United States) Alex Lawson
- Score: 7–6^{(7–3)}, 7–6^{(7–4)}

Events
Singles	Doubles
- Columbus Challenger

Martin Redlicki and Jackson Withrow were the defending champions but only Redlicki chose to defend his title, partnering Diego Hidalgo. Redlicki lost in the first round to Nam Ji-sung and Song Min-kyu.

Treat Huey and Nathaniel Lammons won the title after defeating Lloyd Glasspool and Alex Lawson 7–6^{(7–3)}, 7–6^{(7–4)} in the final.

== Seeds ==
1. (South Korea) Nam Ji-sung / (South Korea) Song Min-kyu (semifinals)
2. (Australia) John-Patrick Smith / (Netherlands) Sem Verbeek (first round)
3. (Sweden) Robert Lindstedt / (Canada) Peter Polansky (withdrew)
4. (Philippines) Treat Huey / (United States) Nathaniel Lammons (champions)

== Draw ==
Key

- Q = Qualifier
- WC = Wild card
- LL = Lucky loser
- Alt = Alternate
- ITF = ITF entry
- PR = Protected ranking
- SR = Special ranking
- SE = Special exempt
- JE = Junior exempt
- JR = Junior Accelerator Programme entrant
- CO = College Accelerator Programme entrant
- NG = Next Gen Accelerator Program entrant
- w/o = Walkover
- r = Retired
- d = Defaulted

First round
1	(South Korea) J-s Nam (South Korea) M-k Song	6	6
(Ecuador) D Hidalgo (United States) Ma Redlicki	2	2
(Ecuador) E Gómez (Ecuador) R Quiroz	7^{8}	7^{7}
WC	(United States) K King (United States) D Young	6^{6}	6^{2}
4	(Philippines) T Huey (United States) N Lammons	7	6
WC	(India) VS Prashanth (India) R Ramanathan	5	4
(India) S Balaji (India) J Nedunchezhiyan	6	6
(Moldova) A Cozbinov (Uzbekistan) D Istomin	3	4
(United States) U Blanch (Argentina) JP Ficovich	6^{1}	4
WC	(United States) JA Ore (United States) Austin Rapp	7^{7}	6
(Philippines) R Gonzales (South Africa) R Roelofse	6	7
Alt	(United States) H Johnson (United States) Y Johnson	2	5
(Australia) A Harris (Australia) M Polmans	7^{7}	6
(Bolivia) B Arias (United States) S Bangoura	6^{4}	3
(United Kingdom) L Glasspool (United States) A Lawson	6	6
2	(Australia) J-P Smith (Netherlands) S Verbeek	3	4

Quarterfinals
1	(South Korea) J-s Nam (South Korea) M-k Song	6	6
(Ecuador) E Gómez (Ecuador) R Quiroz	3	4
4	(Philippines) T Huey (United States) N Lammons	6	6
(India) S Balaji (India) J Nedunchezhiyan	3	2
WC	(United States) JA Ore (United States) A Rapp	6	6^{3}	[6]
(Philippines) R Gonzales (South Africa) R Roelofse	3	7^{7}	[10]
(Australia) A Harris (Australia) M Polmans	3	4
(United Kingdom) L Glasspool (United States) A Lawson	6	6

Semifinals
1	(South Korea) J-s Nam (South Korea) M-k Song	4	6	[5]
4	(Philippines) T Huey (United States) N Lammons	6	4	[10]
(Philippines) R Gonzales (South Africa) R Roelofse	6^{5}	5
(United Kingdom) L Glasspool (United States) A Lawson	7^{7}	7

Final
4	(Philippines) T Huey (United States) N Lammons	7^{7}	7^{7}
(United Kingdom) L Glasspool (United States) A Lawson	6^{3}	6^{4}
