= 2019 JSM Challenger of Champaign–Urbana – Doubles =

Urbana – Doubles
- 2019 JSM Challenger of Champaign–Urbana

Final
- Champions: (United States) Christopher Eubanks (United States) Kevin King
- Runners-up: (United Kingdom) Evan Hoyt (United States) Martin Redlicki
- Score: 7–5, 6–3

Events
Singles	Doubles
← 2018 ·	JSM Challenger of Champaign–Urbana	· 2021 →

Matt Reid and John-Patrick Smith were the defending champions but chose not to defend their title.

Christopher Eubanks and Kevin King won the title after defeating Evan Hoyt and Martin Redlicki 7–5, 6–3 in the final.

== Seeds ==
1. (United States) JC Aragone / (Sweden) André Göransson (quarterfinals)
2. (United Kingdom) Lloyd Glasspool / (United States) Alex Lawson (semifinals)
3. (Philippines) Ruben Gonzales / (South Africa) Ruan Roelofse (first round)
4. (United Kingdom) Evan Hoyt / (United States) Martin Redlicki (final)

== Draw ==
=== Key ===
- Q = Qualifier
- WC = Wild card
- LL = Lucky loser
- Alt = Alternate
- SE = Special exempt
- PR = Protected ranking
- ITF = ITF entry
- JE = Junior exempt
- w/o = Walkover
- r = Retired
- d = Defaulted
- SR = Special ranking

First round
1	(United States) JC Aragone (Sweden) A Göransson	6	6^{3}	[10]
(Mexico) H Hach Verdugo (United States) S Korda	4	7^{7}	[5]
WC	(United States) Vuk Budic (United States) Ezekiel Clark	3	3
WC	(United States) S Kirchheimer (United States) Austin Rapp	6	6
4	(United Kingdom) E Hoyt (United States) Ma Redlicki	6	6
(Argentina) F Cerúndolo (Argentina) JP Ficovich	0	2
Alt	(Belgium) M Geerts (Slovenia) B Kavčič	3	2
WC	(United States) Alexander Brown (United States) A Kovacevic	6	6
(United States) C Eubanks (United States) K King	7^{7}	4	[10]
(Dominican Republic) R Cid Subervi (United States) Evan Song	6^{4}	6	[7]
(United States) H Johnson (United States) Y Johnson	4	6	[11]
3	(Philippines) R Gonzales (South Africa) R Roelofse	6	3	[9]
(United States) Ian Dempster (United States) K Lovett	4	3
(Peru) A Merino (Argentina) M Peña López	6	6
(Bolivia) B Arias (Bolivia) F Zeballos	3	5
2	(United Kingdom) L Glasspool (United States) A Lawson	6	7

Quarterfinals
1	(United States) JC Aragone (Sweden) A Göransson	6^{1}	7	[9]
WC	(United States) S Kirchheimer (United States) A Rapp	7^{7}	5	[11]
4	(United Kingdom) E Hoyt (United States) Ma Redlicki	7^{7}	6
WC	(United States) A Brown (United States) A Kovacevic	6^{4}	3
(United States) C Eubanks (United States) K King	7^{7}	6^{4}	[10]
(United States) H Johnson (United States) Y Johnson	6^{5}	7^{7}	[8]
(Peru) A Merino (Argentina) M Peña López	3	4
2	(United Kingdom) L Glasspool (United States) A Lawson	6	6

Semifinals
WC	(United States) S Kirchheimer (United States) A Rapp	4	4
4	(United Kingdom) E Hoyt (United States) Ma Redlicki	6	6
(United States) C Eubanks (United States) K King	6	6
2	(United Kingdom) L Glasspool (United States) A Lawson	3	2

Final
4	(United Kingdom) E Hoyt (United States) Ma Redlicki	5	3
(United States) C Eubanks (United States) K King	7	6
