= 2020 Columbus Challenger – Singles =

Singles
- 2020 Columbus Challenger

Final
- Champion: (United States) J. J. Wolf
- Runner-up: (Uzbekistan) Denis Istomin
- Score: 6–4, 6–2

Events
Singles	Doubles
- Columbus Challenger

Peter Polansky was the defending champion but lost in the second round to Strong Kirchheimer.

J. J. Wolf won the title after defeating Denis Istomin 6–4, 6–2 in the final.

== Seeds ==
All seeds receive a bye into the second round.

1. (Australia) Christopher O'Connell (third round)
2. (Australia) Marc Polmans (quarterfinals)
3. (Germany) Cedrik-Marcel Stebe (quarterfinals)
4. (Ecuador) Emilio Gómez (third round)
5. (Uzbekistan) Denis Istomin (final)
6. (United States) J. J. Wolf (champion)
7. (Israel) Dudi Sela (second round, retired)
8. (Denmark) Mikael Torpegaard (semifinals)
9. (India) Ramkumar Ramanathan (second round)
10. (Canada) Peter Polansky (second round)
11. (Australia) Andrew Harris (second round)
12. (Australia) Jason Kubler (second round)
13. (Austria) Jurij Rodionov (semifinals)
14. (Argentina) Juan Pablo Ficovich (second round)
15. (South Korea) Nam Ji-sung (third round)
16. (Australia) Aleksandar Vukic (quarterfinals)

== Draw ==
Key

- Q = Qualifier
- WC = Wild card
- LL = Lucky loser
- Alt = Alternate
- ITF = ITF entry
- PR = Protected ranking
- SR = Special ranking
- SE = Special exempt
- JE = Junior exempt
- JR = Junior Accelerator Programme entrant
- CO = College Accelerator Programme entrant
- NG = Next Gen Accelerator Program entrant
- w/o = Walkover
- r = Retired
- d = Defaulted

=== Finals ===
Quarterfinals
13	(Austria) Jurij Rodionov	7^{7}	7^{7}
(Japan) Kaichi Uchida	6^{5}	6^{3}
16	(Australia) Aleksandar Vukic	3	2
5	(Uzbekistan) Denis Istomin	6	6
6	(United States) J. J. Wolf	5	7^{7}	6
3	(Germany) Cedrik-Marcel Stebe	7	6^{4}	3
8	(Denmark) Mikael Torpegaard	7	7^{7}
2	(Australia) Marc Polmans	5	6^{2}

Semifinals
13	(Austria) Jurij Rodionov	3	6^{1}
5	(Uzbekistan) Denis Istomin	6	7^{7}
6	(United States) J. J. Wolf	7^{7}	7^{7}
8	(Denmark) Mikael Torpegaard	6^{2}	6^{5}

Final
5	(Uzbekistan) Denis Istomin	4	2
6	(United States) J. J. Wolf	6	6

=== Top half ===
==== Section 1 ====
First round
(United States) S Bangoura	6	6
Alt	(United States) Austin Rapp	3	3
(Spain) R Ortega Olmedo	6^{5}	2
(Ecuador) D Hidalgo	7^{7}	6
Alt	(United States) S Kirchheimer	4	6	6
(Dominican Republic) J Hernández-Fernández	6	2	3
(Japan) K Uchida	6	3	7^{7}
(United States) Evan Song	3	6	6^{2}

Second round
1	(Australia) C O'Connell	6	6
(United States) S Bangoura	4	2
(Ecuador) D Hidalgo	6	4	4
13	(Austria) J Rodionov	4	6	6
10	(Canada) P Polansky	6	1	6^{5}
Alt	(United States) S Kirchheimer	4	6	7^{7}
(Japan) K Uchida	7	1
7	(Israel) D Sela	5	0^{r}

Third round
1	(Australia) C O'Connell	7^{7}	6^{5}	2
13	(Austria) J Rodionov	6^{4}	7^{7}	6
Alt	(United States) S Kirchheimer	4	6	6^{4}
(Japan) K Uchida	6	1	7^{7}

Quarterfinals
13	(Austria) J Rodionov	7^{7}	7^{7}
(Japan) K Uchida	6^{5}	6^{3}

==== Section 2 ====
First round
(Dominican Republic) N Hardt	6	3	0
(Venezuela) R Rodríguez-Pace	2	6	6
(United States) Ma Redlicki	6^{4}	3
(France) A Escoffier	7^{7}	6
WC	(Canada) J Boulais	4	2
(Brazil) G Clezar	6	6
Alt	(Moldova) A Cozbinov	6	6
Q	(Switzerland) L Castelnuovo	3	2

Second round
4	(Ecuador) E Gómez	6	6
(Venezuela) R Rodríguez-Pace	4	0
(France) A Escoffier	3	6^{6}
16	(Australia) A Vukic	6	7^{8}
12	(Australia) J Kubler	6	6^{1}	4
(Brazil) G Clezar	2	7^{7}	6
Alt	(Moldova) A Cozbinov	2	2
5	(Uzbekistan) D Istomin	6	6

Third round
4	(Ecuador) E Gómez	6^{4}	6	6^{6}
16	(Australia) A Vukic	7^{7}	3	7^{8}
(Brazil) G Clezar	3	1
5	(Uzbekistan) D Istomin	6	6

Quarterfinals
16	(Australia) A Vukic	3	2
5	(Uzbekistan) D Istomin	6	6

=== Bottom half ===
==== Section 3 ====
First round
(United States) Jordi Arconada	3	6^{6}
(United Kingdom) J Ward	6	7^{8}
WC	(United States) J McNally	6^{3}	6^{5}
(Ecuador) R Quiroz	7^{7}	7^{7}
WC	(United States) Alexander Brown	3	6^{5}
(Germany) J Härteis	6	7^{7}
(Croatia) M Pecotić	7^{7}	6
(United States) U Blanch	6^{4}	3

Second round
6	(United States) J. J. Wolf	6^{5}	6	6
(United Kingdom) J Ward	7^{7}	3	4
(Ecuador) R Quiroz	7^{7}	4	6
11	(Australia) A Harris	6^{5}	6	1
14	(Argentina) JP Ficovich	2	6^{5}
(Germany) J Härteis	6	7^{7}
(Croatia) M Pecotić	4	6^{7}
3	(Germany) C-M Stebe	6	7^{9}

Third round
6	(United States) J. J. Wolf	6	4	6
(Ecuador) R Quiroz	2	6	2
(Germany) J Härteis	4	1
3	(Germany) C-M Stebe	6	6

Quarterfinals
6	(United States) J. J. Wolf	5	7^{7}	6
3	(Germany) C-M Stebe	7	6^{4}	3

==== Section 4 ====
First round
(Spain) C Gómez-Herrera	3	3
(United States) K King	6	6
(United States) D Young	5	6^{6}
Q	(China) Z Li	7	7^{8}
(United Kingdom) L Glasspool	7^{7}	6
WC	(United States) C Kingsley	6^{3}	3
Alt	(South Africa) R Roelofse	1	7^{9}	6^{6}
(United States) A Kovacevic	6	6^{7}	7^{8}

Second round
8	(Denmark) M Torpegaard	6^{5}	6	6
(United States) K King	7^{7}	4	4
Q	(China) Z Li	7^{9}	7^{7}
9	(India) R Ramanathan	6^{7}	6^{4}
15	(South Korea) J-s Nam	6	6
(United Kingdom) L Glasspool	3	2
(United States) A Kovacevic	6^{6}	4
2	(Australia) M Polmans	7^{8}	6

Third round
8	(Denmark) M Torpegaard	7^{7}	4	6
Q	(China) Z Li	6^{2}	6	4
15	(South Korea) J-s Nam	3	5
2	(Australia) M Polmans	6	7

Quarterfinals
8	(Denmark) M Torpegaard	7	7^{7}
2	(Australia) M Polmans	5	6^{2}
