= 2019 Kentucky Bank Tennis Championships =

- Date: 29 July–4 August 2019
- Edition: 24th (ATP); 22nd (ITF)
- Category: ATP Challenger Tour; ITF Women's Circuit
- Prize money: $54,160 (ATP) $60,000 (ITF)
- Surface: Hard
- Location: Lexington, United States

Champions

Men's singles
- (Italy) Jannik Sinner

Women's singles
- (South Korea) Kim Da-bin

Men's doubles
- (Ecuador) Diego Hidalgo / (United States) Martin Redlicki

Women's doubles
- (United States) Robin Anderson / (France) Jessika Ponchet
- Lexington Challenger

The 2019 Kentucky Bank Tennis Championships was a professional tennis tournament played on outdoor hard courts. It was the 24th (ATP) and 22nd (ITF) editions of the tournament and was part of the 2019 ATP Challenger Tour and the 2019 ITF Women's World Tennis Tour. It took place in Lexington, the United States, from 29 July–to 4 August 2019.

== Men's singles main draw entrants ==
=== Seeds ===
Country	Player	Rank^{1}	Seed
CAN	Peter Polansky	147	1
AUS	Alex Bolt	148	2
ITA	Jannik Sinner	199	3
AUS	Andrew Harris	205	4
KOR	Lee Duck-hee	211	5
~~JPN~~	~~Yosuke Watanuki~~	~~219~~	~~6~~
AUS	Akira Santillan	222	7
JPN	Kaichi Uchida	240	8
AUS	Maverick Banes	245	9
~~USA~~	~~J. J. Wolf~~	~~261~~	~~10~~
AUS	Aleksandar Vukic	262	11
RUS	Evgeny Karlovskiy	267	12
USA	JC Aragone	270	13
GBR	Liam Broady	278	14
USA	Collin Altamirano	283	15
USA	Maxime Cressy	295	16

- ^{1} Rankings as of 22 July 2019.

=== Other entrants ===
The following players received a wildcard into the singles main draw:

- (United States) Ezekiel Clark
- (United States) Ronald Hohmann
- (United States) Toby Alex Kodat
- (United States) Nicolas Moreno de Alboran
- (France) Enzo Wallart

The following player received entry into the singles main draw as a special exempt:

- (Canada) Peter Polansky

The following players received entry into the singles main draw as alternates:

- (Netherlands) Sem Verbeek
- (Russia) Alexey Zakharov

The following players received entry into the singles main draw using their ITF World Tennis Ranking:

- (Ecuador) Diego Hidalgo
- (United Kingdom) Evan Hoyt
- (United States) Strong Kirchheimer
- (Greece) Michail Pervolarakis
- (Northern Mariana Islands) Colin Sinclair

The following players received entry from the qualifying draw:

- (United States) Vasil Kirkov
- (United States) Keegan Smith

The following player received entry as a lucky loser:

- (United States) Alexander Lebedev

== Women's singles main draw entrants ==
=== Seeds ===
Country	Player	Rank^{1}	Seed
FRA	Jessika Ponchet	169	1
USA	Ann Li	172	2
USA	Robin Anderson	174	3
KOR	Han Na-lae	175	4
AUS	Zoe Hives	200	5
POL	Magdalena Fręch	236	6
ISR	Deniz Khazaniuk	255	7
GBR	Katie Swan	256	8

- ^{1} Rankings as of 22 July 2019

=== Other entrants ===
The following players received a wildcard into the singles main draw:

- (United States) Katharine Fahey
- (Lithuania) Justina Mikulskytė

The following players received entry from the qualifying draw:

- (Russia) Angelina Gabueva
- (South Korea) Kim Da-bin
- (Italy) Verena Meliss
- (United States) Alycia Parks
- (United States) Peyton Stearns
- (United Kingdom) Emily Webley-Smith

== Champions ==
=== Men's singles ===
- (Italy) Jannik Sinner def. (Australia) Alex Bolt 6–4, 3–6, 6–4.

=== Women's singles ===
- (South Korea) Kim Da-bin def. (United States) Ann Li, 6–1, 6–3

=== Men's doubles ===
- (Ecuador) Diego Hidalgo / (United States) Martin Redlicki def. (Venezuela) Roberto Maytín / (United States) Jackson Withrow 6–2, 6–2.

=== Women's doubles ===
- (United States) Robin Anderson / (France) Jessika Ponchet def. (United States) Ann Li / (United States) Jamie Loeb, 7–6^{(7–4)}, 6–7^{(5–7)}, [10–7]
