= 2021 JSM Challenger of Champaign–Urbana – Doubles =

Urbana – Doubles
- 2021 JSM Challenger of Champaign–Urbana

Final
- Champions: (United States) Nathaniel Lammons (United States) Jackson Withrow
- Runners-up: (Philippines) Treat Huey (United States) Max Schnur
- Score: 6–4, 3–6, [10–6]

Events
Singles	Doubles
← 2019 ·	JSM Challenger of Champaign–Urbana	· 2022 →

Christopher Eubanks and Kevin King were the defending champions but chose not to defend their title.

Nathaniel Lammons and Jackson Withrow won the title after defeating Treat Huey and Max Schnur 6–4, 3–6, [10–6] in the final.

== Seeds ==
1. (United States) Nathaniel Lammons / (United States) Jackson Withrow (champions)
2. (Philippines) Treat Huey / (United States) Max Schnur (final)
3. (United States) JC Aragone / (United States) Robert Galloway (quarterfinals)
4. (South Africa) Ruan Roelofse / (Indonesia) Christopher Rungkat (semifinals)

== Draw ==
=== Key ===
- Q = Qualifier
- WC = Wild card
- LL = Lucky loser
- Alt = Alternate
- SE = Special exempt
- PR = Protected ranking
- ITF = ITF entry
- JE = Junior exempt
- w/o = Walkover
- r = Retired
- d = Defaulted
- SR = Special ranking

First round
1	(United States) N Lammons (United States) J Withrow	6	3	[10]
(United States) T-S Kwiatkowski (United States) A Lawson	4	6	[6]
(Philippines) R Gonzales (United States) H Johnson	4	7^{7}	[9]
(Netherlands) G Brouwer (United States) R Stalder	6	6^{5}	[11]
4	(South Africa) R Roelofse (Indonesia) C Rungkat	6	6
WC	(United States) Felix Corwin (United States) Wally Thayne	4	2
(India) A Kadhe (Chinese Taipei) T-l Wu	5	5
(United States) A Kovacevic (Australia) A Vukic	7	7
(Spain) D Marrero (Japan) Y Uchiyama
(Canada) A Galarneau (Colombia) N Mejía	w/o
(Chinese Taipei) J Jung (United States) E King	3	5
3	(United States) JC Aragone (United States) R Galloway	6	7
(Tunisia) M Jaziri (United States) D Novikov	4	4
WC	(United States) V Kirkov (United States) B Shelton	6	6
WC	(United States) Hunter Heck (United States) Lucas Horve	3	2
2	(Philippines) T Huey (United States) M Schnur	6	6

Quarterfinals
1	(United States) N Lammons (United States) J Withrow	6	7^{8}
(Netherlands) G Brouwer (United States) R Stalder	4	6^{6}
4	(South Africa) R Roelofse (Indonesia) C Rungkat	6^{5}	6	[10]
(United States) A Kovacevic (Australia) A Vukic	7^{7}	3	[8]
(Canada) A Galarneau (Colombia) N Mejía	6	4	[10]
3	(United States) JC Aragone (United States) R Galloway	4	6	[8]
WC	(United States) V Kirkov (United States) B Shelton	5	3
2	(Philippines) T Huey (United States) M Schnur	7	6

Semifinals
1	(United States) N Lammons (United States) J Withrow	7^{7}	6^{4}	[10]
4	(South Africa) R Roelofse (Indonesia) C Rungkat	6^{4}	7^{7}	[6]
(Canada) A Galarneau (Colombia) N Mejía	0	2
2	(Philippines) T Huey (United States) M Schnur	6	6

Final
1	(United States) N Lammons (United States) J Withrow	6	3	[10]
2	(Philippines) T Huey (United States) M Schnur	4	6	[6]
