= 2020 Columbus Challenger =

- Date: 24 February – 1 March
- Edition: 9th
- Draw: 48S / 16D
- Surface: Hard
- Location: Columbus, United States

Champions

Singles
- (United States) J. J. Wolf

Doubles
- (Philippines) Treat Huey / (United States) Nathaniel Lammons
← 2019 ·	Columbus Challenger	· 2021 →

The 2020 Columbus Challenger was a professional tennis tournament played on hard courts. It was the ninth edition of the tournament which was part of the 2020 ATP Challenger Tour. It took place in Columbus, United States between 24 February and 1 March 2020.

== Singles main draw entrants ==
=== Seeds ===
Country	Player	Rank^{1}	Seed
AUS	Christopher O'Connell	115	1
AUS	Marc Polmans	120	2
GER	Cedrik-Marcel Stebe	147	3
ECU	Emilio Gómez	148	4
UZB	Denis Istomin	164	5
USA	J. J. Wolf	165	6
ISR	Dudi Sela	167	7
DEN	Mikael Torpegaard	177	8
IND	Ramkumar Ramanathan	179	9
CAN	Peter Polansky	186	10
AUS	Andrew Harris	190	11
AUS	Jason Kubler	229	12
AUT	Jurij Rodionov	230	13
ARG	Juan Pablo Ficovich	231	14
KOR	Nam Ji-sung	242	15
AUS	Aleksandar Vukic	251	16

- ^{1} Rankings are as of February 17, 2020.

=== Other entrants ===
The following players received entry into the singles main draw as wildcards:

- (Canada) Justin Boulais
- (United States) Alexander Brown
- (United States) Cannon Kingsley
- ~~(United States) Peter Kobelt~~
- (United States) John McNally

The following players received entry into the singles main draw as alternates:

- (Moldova) Alexander Cozbinov
- (United States) Strong Kirchheimer
- (United States) Austin Rapp
- (South Africa) Ruan Roelofse

The following players received entry from the qualifying draw:

- (Switzerland) Luca Castelnuovo
- (China) Li Zhe

== Champions ==
=== Singles ===
- (United States) J. J. Wolf def. (Uzbekistan) Denis Istomin 6–4, 6–2.

=== Doubles ===
- (Philippines) Treat Huey / (United States) Nathaniel Lammons def. (United Kingdom) Lloyd Glasspool / (United States) Alex Lawson 7–6^{(7–3)}, 7–6^{(7–4)}.
