= 2019 Columbus Challenger III =

- Date: 16–22 September
- Edition: 8th
- Draw: 48S / 16D
- Surface: Hard
- Location: Columbus, United States

Champions

Singles
- (Canada) Peter Polansky

Doubles
- (United States) Martin Redlicki / (United States) Jackson Withrow
← 2019 ·	Columbus Challenger	· 2020 →

The 2019 Columbus Challenger III was a professional tennis tournament played on hard courts. It was the eighth edition of the tournament which was part of the 2019 ATP Challenger Tour. It took place in Columbus, United States between 16 and 22 September 2019.

== Singles main draw entrants ==
=== Seeds ===
Country	Player	Rank^{1}	Seed
ECU	Emilio Gómez	164	1
DEN	Mikael Torpegaard	168	2
USA	Michael Mmoh	186	3
CAN	Peter Polansky	198	4
USA	Thai-Son Kwiatkowski	206	5
FRA	Enzo Couacaud	207	6
USA	Maxime Cressy	230	7
USA	Donald Young	242	8
ECU	Roberto Quiroz	249	9
GBR	Liam Broady	266	10
ARG	Renzo Olivo	271	11
DOM	Roberto Cid Subervi	281	12
USA	J. J. Wolf	282	13
CAN	Filip Peliwo	296	14
USA	Roy Smith	315	15
USA	Michael Redlicki	353	16

- ^{1} Rankings are as of September 9, 2019.

=== Other entrants ===
The following players received entry into the singles main draw as wildcards:

- (Canada) Justin Boulais
- (United States) Robert Cash
- (United States) Cannon Kingsley
- (United States) Kyle Seelig
- (Japan) James Trotter

The following player received entry into the singles main draw as an alternate:

- (Canada) Benjamin Sigouin

The following players received entry from the qualifying draw:

- (United States) Ezekiel Clark
- (United States) Jacob Dunbar

== Champions ==
=== Singles ===
- (Canada) Peter Polansky def. (United States) J. J. Wolf 6–3, 7–6^{(7–4)}.

=== Doubles ===
- (United States) Martin Redlicki / (United States) Jackson Withrow def. (United States) Nathan Pasha / (United States) Max Schnur 6–4, 7–6^{(7–4)}.
