= 2019 Columbus Challenger III – Doubles =

Doubles
- 2019 Columbus Challenger III

Final
- Champions: (United States) Martin Redlicki (United States) Jackson Withrow
- Runners-up: (United States) Nathan Pasha (United States) Max Schnur
- Score: 6–4, 7–6^{(7–4)}

Events
Singles	Doubles
- Columbus Challenger

Roberto Maytín and Jackson Withrow were the defending champions but chose to defend their title with different partners. Maytín partnered Robert Galloway but lost in the first round to Filip Peliwo and Roy Smith. Withrow partnered Martin Redlicki and successfully defended his title.

Redlicki and Withrow won the title after defeating Nathan Pasha and Max Schnur 6–4, 7–6^{(7–4)} in the final.

== Seeds ==
1. (United States) Robert Galloway / (Venezuela) Roberto Maytín (first round)
2. (Ecuador) Gonzalo Escobar / (Ecuador) Roberto Quiroz (first round)
3. (Mexico) Hans Hach Verdugo / (United States) Dennis Novikov (quarterfinals)
4. (United States) Martin Redlicki / (United States) Jackson Withrow (champions)

== Draw ==
Key

- Q = Qualifier
- WC = Wild card
- LL = Lucky loser
- Alt = Alternate
- ITF = ITF entry
- PR = Protected ranking
- SR = Special ranking
- SE = Special exempt
- JE = Junior exempt
- JR = Junior Accelerator Programme entrant
- CO = College Accelerator Programme entrant
- NG = Next Gen Accelerator Program entrant
- w/o = Walkover
- r = Retired
- d = Defaulted

First round
1	(United States) R Galloway (Venezuela) R Maytín	7^{7}	4	[8]
(Canada) F Peliwo (United States) Roy Smith	6^{5}	6	[10]
WC	(Canada) J Boulais (Japan) J Trotter	6	3	[5]
(United States) A Lawson (United States) D Young	4	6	[10]
4	(United States) Ma Redlicki (United States) J Withrow	6	6^{0}	[10]
(United States) H Johnson (United States) Y Johnson	4	7^{7}	[5]
(United States) T-S Kwiatkowski (Canada) P Polansky	3	1
PR	(United Kingdom) L Broady (Spain) C Gómez-Herrera	6	6
(France) E Couacaud (Philippines) T Huey	6	6
(Ecuador) D Hidalgo (Venezuela) LD Martínez	2	2
WC	(United States) R Cash (United States) J McNally	3	5
3	(Mexico) H Hach Verdugo (United States) D Novikov	6	7
(United States) J Cerretani (United States) M Cressy	6	6
WC	(United States) C Kingsley (United States) J Mercer	4	3
(United States) N Pasha (United States) M Schnur	6	6^{4}	[10]
2	(Ecuador) G Escobar (Ecuador) R Quiroz	4	7^{7}	[7]

Quarterfinals
(Canada) F Peliwo (United States) R Smith	3	4
(United States) A Lawson (United States) D Young	6	6
4	(United States) Ma Redlicki (United States) J Withrow	6	6
PR	(United Kingdom) L Broady (Spain) C Gómez-Herrera	3	2
(France) E Couacaud (Philippines) T Huey	7^{7}	6
3	(Mexico) H Hach Verdugo (United States) D Novikov	6^{2}	4
(United States) J Cerretani (United States) M Cressy	7^{7}	5	[10]
(United States) N Pasha (United States) M Schnur	6^{5}	7	[12]

Semifinals
(United States) A Lawson (United States) D Young	6	6^{3}	[3]
4	(United States) Ma Redlicki (United States) J Withrow	0	7^{7}	[10]
(France) E Couacaud (Philippines) T Huey	6	3	[5]
(United States) N Pasha (United States) M Schnur	3	6	[10]

Final
4	(United States) Ma Redlicki (United States) J Withrow	6	7^{7}
(United States) N Pasha (United States) M Schnur	4	6^{4}
