= 2019 Kentucky Bank Tennis Championships – Men's doubles =

Men's doubles
- 2019 Kentucky Bank Tennis Championships

Final
- Champions: (Ecuador) Diego Hidalgo (United States) Martin Redlicki
- Runners-up: (Venezuela) Roberto Maytín (United States) Jackson Withrow
- Score: 6–2, 6–2

Events
Singles	men	women
Doubles	men	women
← 2018 ·	Kentucky Bank Tennis Championships	· 2021 →

Robert Galloway and Roberto Maytín were the defending champions but only Maytín chose to defend his title, partnering Jackson Withrow. Maytín lost in the final to Diego Hidalgo and Martin Redlicki.

Hidalgo and Redlicki won the title after defeating Maytín and Withrow 6–2, 6–2 in the final.

== Seeds ==
1. (Venezuela) Roberto Maytín / (United States) Jackson Withrow (final)
2. (United States) Alex Lawson / (United States) Hunter Reese (first round)
3. (Sweden) André Göransson / (Netherlands) Sem Verbeek (semifinals)
4. (United States) JC Aragone / (United Kingdom) Liam Broady (semifinals)

== Draw ==
=== Key ===
- Q = Qualifier
- WC = Wild card
- LL = Lucky loser
- Alt = Alternate
- SE = Special exempt
- PR = Protected ranking
- ITF = ITF entry
- JE = Junior exempt
- w/o = Walkover
- r = Retired
- d = Defaulted
- SR = Special ranking

First round
1	(Venezuela) R Maytín (United States) J Withrow	6	6
(United Kingdom) E Hoyt (Portugal) B Saraiva	4	2
WC	(United States) M Cressy (United States) K Smith	6	6
(Russia) T Gabashvili (Ukraine) V Uzhylovskyi	3	2
4	(United States) JC Aragone (United Kingdom) L Broady	7^{9}	6^{3}	[10]
Alt	(United States) S Kirchheimer (United States) R Shane	6^{7}	7^{7}	[6]
(United States) C Altamirano (United States) A Ritschard	6	0
(South Korea) D-h Lee (Japan) K Uchida	1	0^{r}
WC	(United States) E Quigley (United States) J Witten	6	6
WC	(United States) W Bushamuka (United States) Matt Halpin	2	3
(Australia) M Banes (Australia) A Vukic	1	2
3	(Sweden) A Göransson (Netherlands) S Verbeek	6	6
ITF	(Ecuador) D Hidalgo (United States) Ma Redlicki	6	7
(Australia) A Santillan (United States) R Sarmiento	4	5
ITF	(United Kingdom) L Glasspool (Greece) M Pervolarakis	7^{7}	6
2	(United States) A Lawson (United States) H Reese	6^{5}	4

Quarterfinals
1	(Venezuela) R Maytín (United States) J Withrow	6^{13}	6	[10]
WC	(United States) M Cressy (United States) K Smith	7^{15}	4	[6]
4	(United States) JC Aragone (United Kingdom) L Broady	6	6
(United States) C Altamirano (United States) A Ritschard	3	4
WC	(United States) E Quigley (United States) J Witten	1	3
3	(Sweden) A Göransson (Netherlands) S Verbeek	6	6
ITF	(Ecuador) D Hidalgo (United States) Ma Redlicki	6^{5}	7^{7}	[10]
ITF	(United Kingdom) L Glasspool (Greece) M Pervolarakis	7^{7}	6^{2}	[1]

Semifinals
1	(Venezuela) R Maytín (United States) J Withrow	6	6
4	(United States) JC Aragone (United Kingdom) L Broady	4	4
3	(Sweden) A Göransson (Netherlands) S Verbeek	3	4
ITF	(Ecuador) D Hidalgo (United States) Ma Redlicki	6	6

Final
1	(Venezuela) R Maytín (United States) J Withrow	2	2
ITF	(Ecuador) D Hidalgo (United States) Ma Redlicki	6	6
