= 2021 Las Vegas Challenger – Singles =

Singles
- 2021 Las Vegas Challenger

Final
- Champion: (United States) J. J. Wolf
- Runner-up: (United States) Stefan Kozlov
- Score: 6–4, 6–4

Events
Singles	Doubles
- Las Vegas Challenger

Vasek Pospisil was the defending champion but chose not to defend his title.

J. J. Wolf won the title after defeating Stefan Kozlov 6–4, 6–4 in the final.

== Seeds ==
1. (United States) Steve Johnson (first round)
2. (United States) Denis Kudla (second round)
3. (United States) Tennys Sandgren (first round, retired)
4. (Germany) Daniel Altmaier (second round)
5. (Japan) Taro Daniel (quarterfinals)
6. (United States) Mitchell Krueger (first round)
7. (Ecuador) Emilio Gómez (quarterfinals)
8. (Chinese Taipei) Jason Jung (first round)

== Draw ==
Key

- Q = Qualifier
- WC = Wild card
- LL = Lucky loser
- Alt = Alternate
- ITF = ITF entry
- PR = Protected ranking
- SR = Special ranking
- SE = Special exempt
- JE = Junior exempt
- JR = Junior Accelerator Programme entrant
- CO = College Accelerator Programme entrant
- NG = Next Gen Accelerator Program entrant
- w/o = Walkover
- r = Retired
- d = Defaulted

=== Finals ===
Semifinals
Alt	(United States) Stefan Kozlov	6	6
WC	(United States) Aleksandar Kovacevic	2	4
(United States) Michael Mmoh	3	2
(United States) J. J. Wolf	6	6

Final
Alt	(United States) Stefan Kozlov	4	4
(United States) J. J. Wolf	6	6

=== Top half ===
First round
1	(United States) S Johnson	4	4
LL	(United Kingdom) A McHugh	6	6
Q	(India) M Sasikumar	2	4
Alt	(United States) S Kozlov	6	6
(Australia) J Kubler	6^{5}	6	7^{8}
(Japan) Yo Watanuki	7^{7}	0	6^{6}
(Germany) C-M Stebe	6^{2}	0
7	(Ecuador) E Gómez	7^{7}	6
4	(Germany) D Altmaier	7^{8}	6
(Japan) Y Uchiyama	6^{6}	1
WC	(United States) A Kovacevic	6	3	7^{7}
(United States) C Eubanks	1	6	6^{5}
Q	(United States) D Young	4	4
(Japan) T Ito	6	6
WC	(South Africa) Jordan Sauer	0	2
5	(Japan) T Daniel	6	6

Second round
LL	(United Kingdom) A McHugh	2	7	6^{13}
Alt	(United States) S Kozlov	6	5	7^{15}
(Australia) J Kubler	6	0	6^{8}
7	(Ecuador) E Gómez	2	6	7^{10}
4	(Germany) D Altmaier	6^{7}	3
WC	(United States) A Kovacevic	7^{9}	6
(Japan) T Ito	2	1
5	(Japan) T Daniel	6	6

Quarterfinals
Alt	(United States) S Kozlov	7^{7}	6
7	(Ecuador) E Gómez	6^{3}	4
WC	(United States) A Kovacevic	6	6
5	(Japan) T Daniel	3	2

Semifinals
Alt	(United States) S Kozlov	6	6
WC	(United States) A Kovacevic	2	4

=== Bottom half ===
First round
6	(United States) M Krueger	4	1
(Australia) A Vukic	6	6
(United States) M Mmoh	6	6
LL	(United States) N Chappell	2	1
Q	(Australia) D Kelly	6	6
WC	(Nigeria) Christopher Bulus	3	2
(Denmark) M Torpegaard	6^{4}	7	3
3	(United States) T Sandgren	7^{7}	5	0^{r}
8	(Chinese Taipei) J Jung	5	2
(United States) T-S Kwiatkowski	7	6
(United States) B Fratangelo	7^{8}	6^{2}	6^{5}
(United States) E Escobedo	6^{6}	7^{7}	7^{7}
Q	(Japan) S Mochizuki	3	5
(United States) J. J. Wolf	6	7
(Canada) B Schnur	3	2
2	(United States) D Kudla	6	6

Second round
(Australia) A Vukic	4	4
(United States) M Mmoh	6	6
Q	(Australia) D Kelly	2	3
(Denmark) M Torpegaard	6	6
(United States) T-S Kwiatkowski	5	2
(United States) E Escobedo	7	6
(United States) J. J. Wolf	4	6	6
2	(United States) D Kudla	6	3	0

Quarterfinals
(United States) M Mmoh	6	6^{5}	6
(Denmark) M Torpegaard	1	7^{7}	1
(United States) E Escobedo	3	3
(United States) J. J. Wolf	6	6

Semifinals
(United States) M Mmoh	3	2
(United States) J. J. Wolf	6	6
