= 2019 Kentucky Bank Tennis Championships – Women's doubles =

Women's doubles
- 2019 Kentucky Bank Tennis Championships

Final
- Champions: (United States) Robin Anderson (France) Jessika Ponchet
- Runners-up: (United States) Ann Li (United States) Jamie Loeb
- Score: 7–6^{(7–4)}, 6–7^{(5–7)}, [10–7]

Events
Singles	men	women
Doubles	men	women
- Lexington Challenger

Hayley Carter and Ena Shibahara were the defending champions, but chose not to participate.

Robin Anderson and Jessika Ponchet won the title, defeating Ann Li and Jamie Loeb in the final, 7–6^{(7–4)}, 6–7^{(5–7)}, [10–7].

== Seeds ==
1. (United States) Sophie Chang / (United States) Alexandra Mueller (quarterfinals)
2. (Japan) Junri Namigata / (United Kingdom) Emily Webley-Smith (quarterfinals)
3. (United States) Robin Anderson / (France) Jessika Ponchet (champions)
4. (South Korea) Han Na-lae / (South Korea) Kim Da-bin (first round)

== Draw ==
Key

- Q = Qualifier
- WC = Wild card
- LL = Lucky loser
- Alt = Alternate
- ITF = ITF entry
- PR = Protected ranking
- SR = Special ranking
- SE = Special exempt
- JE = Junior exempt
- JR = Junior Accelerator Programme entrant
- CO = College Accelerator Programme entrant
- NG = Next Gen Accelerator Program entrant
- w/o = Walkover
- r = Retired
- d = Defaulted

=== Draw ===
First round
1	(United States) S Chang (United States) A Mueller	6	6
(United States) J Kissell (United States) M Kobelt	1	1
(United States) J Elie (United States) E Turner	1	1
(United States) A Li (United States) J Loeb	6	6
4	(South Korea) N-l Han (South Korea) D-b Kim	4	5
(Montenegro) V Babić (Sweden) J Rosenqvist	6	7
(United States) A Nefedova (United States) A Parks	2	2
(Lithuania) J Mikulskytė (Lithuania) A Paražinskaitė	6	6
(Oman) F Al-Nabhani (Russia) A Gabueva	6	6
WC	(United States) C Beckman (United States) L Waddles	1	1
(United States) A Crump (United States) R Small	0	0
3	(United States) R Anderson (France) J Ponchet	6	6
(New Zealand) E Fanning (Australia) A Myers	3	2
(United States) S Marand (United States) C Whoriskey	6	6
(United States) B Collens (France) T Fiquet	0	0
2	(Japan) J Namigata (United Kingdom) E Webley-Smith	6	6

Quarterfinals
1	(United States) S Chang (United States) A Mueller	4	6	[7]
(United States) A Li (United States) J Loeb	6	3	[10]
(Montenegro) V Babić (Sweden) J Rosenqvist	4	4
(Lithuania) J Mikulskytė (Lithuania) A Paražinskaitė	6	6
(Oman) F Al-Nabhani (Russia) A Gabueva	3	4
3	(United States) R Anderson (France) J Ponchet	6	6
(United States) S Marand (United States) C Whoriskey	7	6
2	(Japan) J Namigata (United Kingdom) E Webley-Smith	5	4

Semifinals
(United States) A Li (United States) J Loeb	6	2	[10]
(Lithuania) J Mikulskytė (Lithuania) A Paražinskaitė	3	6	[7]
3	(United States) R Anderson (France) J Ponchet	7	6
(United States) S Marand (United States) C Whoriskey	5	1

Final
(United States) A Li (United States) J Loeb	6^{4}	7^{7}	[7]
3	(United States) R Anderson (France) J Ponchet	7^{7}	6^{5}	[10]
