= 2013 US Open (tennis) =

- Date: August 26 – September 9
- Edition: 133rd
- Category: Grand Slam (ITF)
- Surface: Hardcourt
- Location: New York City, United States
- Venue: USTA Billie Jean King National Tennis Center

Champions

Men's singles
- (Spain) Rafael Nadal

Women's singles
- (United States) Serena Williams

Men's doubles
- (India) Leander Paes / (Czech Republic) Radek Štěpánek

Women's doubles
- (Czech Republic) Andrea Hlaváčková / (Czech Republic) Lucie Hradecká

Mixed doubles
- (Czech Republic) Andrea Hlaváčková / (Belarus) Max Mirnyi

Wheelchair men's singles
- (France) Stéphane Houdet

Wheelchair women's singles
- (Netherlands) Aniek van Koot

Wheelchair quad singles
- (South Africa) Lucas Sithole

Wheelchair men's doubles
- (France) Michaël Jérémiasz / (Netherlands) Maikel Scheffers

Wheelchair women's doubles
- (Netherlands) Jiske Griffioen / (Netherlands) Aniek van Koot

Wheelchair quad doubles
- (United States) Nick Taylor / (United States) David Wagner

Boys' singles
- (Croatia) Borna Ćorić

Girls' singles
- (Croatia) Ana Konjuh

Boys' doubles
- (Poland) Kamil Majchrzak / (United States) Martin Redlicki

Girls' doubles
- (Czech Republic) Barbora Krejčíková / (Czech Republic) Kateřina Siniaková
- US Open

The 2013 US Open was a tennis tournament played on outdoor hard courts. It was the 133rd edition of the US Open, the fourth and final Grand Slam event of the year. It took place at the USTA Billie Jean King National Tennis Center, and ran from August 26 to September 9.

Andy Murray and Serena Williams were the defending champions in the singles events. Williams successfully defended her title, but Murray was defeated in the quarterfinals by Stanislas Wawrinka. Rafael Nadal won the men's singles.

== Tournament ==
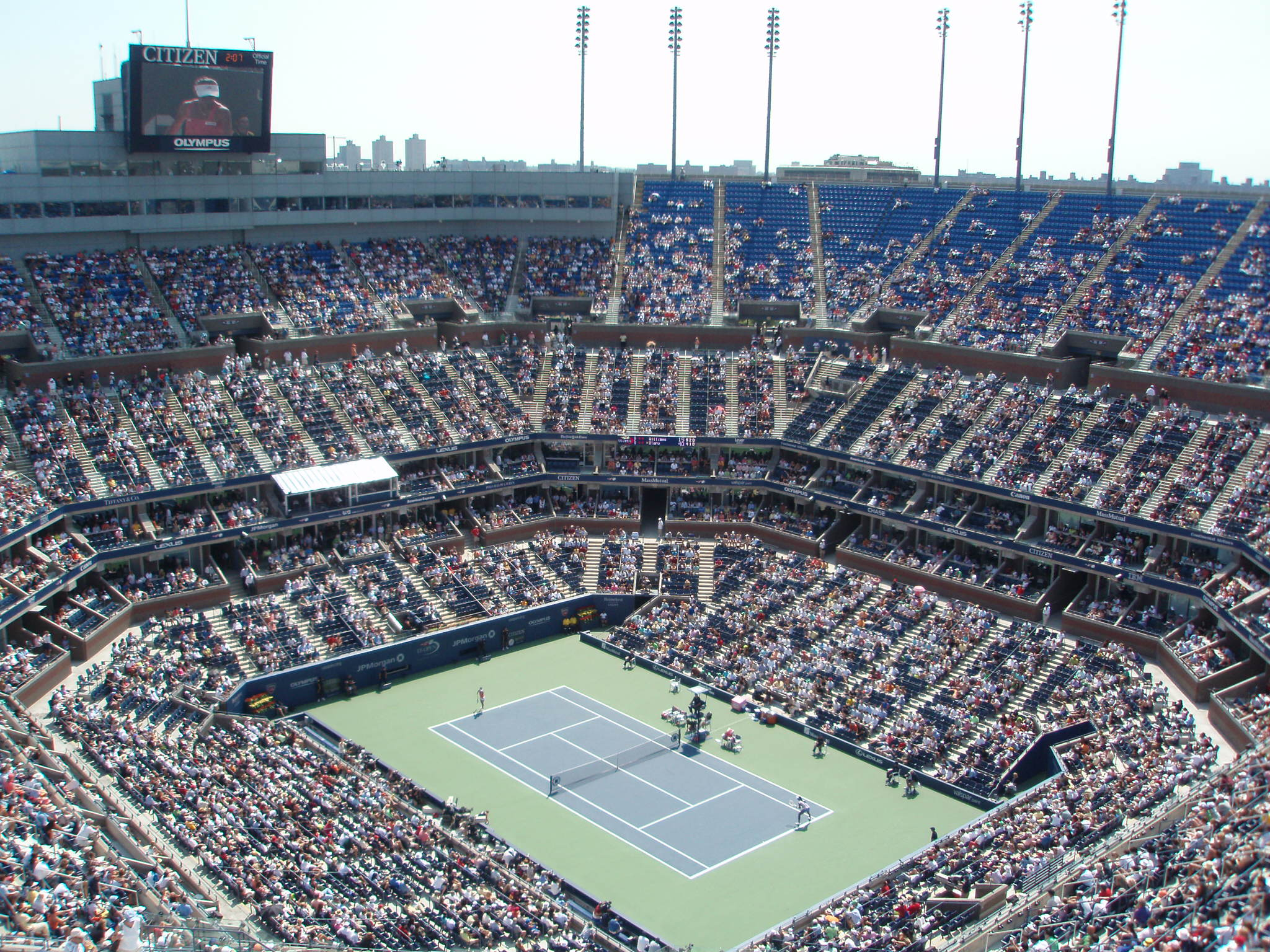
Arthur Ashe Stadium where the Finals of US Open take place

The 2013 US Open was the 133rd edition of the tournament and was held at USTA Billie Jean King National Tennis Center in New York City, United States.

The tournament was an event run by the International Tennis Federation (ITF) and was part of the 2013 ATP World Tour and the 2013 WTA Tour calendars under the Grand Slam category. The tournament consisted of both men's and women's singles and doubles draws as well as a mixed doubles event. There were singles and doubles events for both boys and girls (players under 18), which was part of the Grade A category of tournaments, and after one-year break due to Paralympic Games in London singles, doubles and quad events for men's and women's wheelchair tennis players as part of the NEC tour under the Grand Slam category.

The tournament was played on hard courts and took place over a series of 17 courts, including the three main showcourts, Arthur Ashe Stadium, Louis Armstrong Stadium and Grandstand.

== Notable events ==
- In 2008–2012, due to inclement weather conditions, the tournament lasted 15 instead of the scheduled 14 days, ending on the third Monday. In 2013, the schedule was extended to 15 days, potentially giving the players one more day to prepare for the final match.
- Maria Sharapova, 2006 champion, ranked third in the world (formerly first), withdrew from the tournament due to a shoulder injury.
- In a second round match which pitted the 2001 and 2009 men's champions against each other, Lleyton Hewitt defeated Juan Martín del Potro in five grueling sets lasting over four hours; this marked the first time since he won the title in 2001 that Hewitt had defeated a top ten opponent at the US Open.
- By winning the first set in her fourth round loss to Victoria Azarenka, Ana Ivanovic won her first set against a top ten opponent at a Grand Slam since she won the 2008 French Open, ending a streak of 15 consecutive sets lost against a top ten seed.^{[note a]}
- Serena Williams won 24 consecutive games from 1–1 in the second set against Sloane Stephens in the fourth round through to 1–0 in the second set against Li Na in the semi-finals, breaking her own record of 23 games at last year's US Open.
- For the second consecutive year, Serena Williams and Victoria Azarenka contested the women's final, marking the first time since 2001–2 in which two consecutive US Open finals were contested between the same two players.
- With Novak Djokovic and Rafael Nadal contesting the men's final, this marked the first time since the 2000 Australian Open in which both the men's and women's finals were contested between the top two.
- By winning the tournament, both Rafael Nadal and Serena Williams collected the biggest payday in tennis history of $3.6M ($2.6M for the championship and an added $1M bonus for winning the 2013 US Open Series). Also, with the win, Williams and Nadal have now won each Grand Slam together – the Australian Open (2009), the French Open (2013), Wimbledon (2010) and the US Open (2013). They are the first male-female pair in the entire history of tennis, not just in the Open Era, to win all four Grand Slams together.^{a}
- By winning the US Open, Rafael Nadal became the first player since Andy Roddick in 2003 to capture the 3 major consecutive US hardcourt season titles, namely the Roger's Cup, Cincinnati Masters and US Open.

Note:

^[note a]Ana Ivanovic retired in the second set of her fourth round match against Venus Williams at Wimbledon in 2009; thus, the losing streak of sets is 15.

== Point and prize money distribution ==
=== Point distribution ===
Below is a series of tables for each of the competitions showing the ranking points on offer for each event.

==== Seniors points ====
Event	W	F	SF	QF	Round of 16	Round of 32	Round of 64	Round of 128	Q	Q3	Q2	Q1
Men's singles	2000	1200	720	360	180	90	45	10	25	16	8	0
Men's doubles	2000	1200	720	360	180	90	0	—N/a	—N/a	—N/a	—N/a	—N/a
Women's singles	2000	1400	900	500	280	160	100	5	60	50	40	2
Women's doubles	2000	1400	900	500	280	160	5	—N/a	—N/a	—N/a	—N/a	—N/a

==== Wheelchair points ====
Event	W	F	SF/3rd	QF/4th
Singles	800	500	375	100
Doubles	800	500	100	—N/a
Quad singles	800	500	100	—N/a
Quad doubles	800	100	—N/a	—N/a

==== Junior points ====
Event	W	F	SF	QF	Round of 16	Round of 32	Q	Q3
Boys' singles	375	270	180	120	75	30	25	20
Girls' singles	375	270	180	120	75	30	25	20
Boys' doubles	270	180	120	75	45	—N/a	—N/a	—N/a
Girls' doubles	270	180	120	75	45	—N/a	—N/a	—N/a

=== Prize money ===
The US Open total prize money for 2013 was increased by almost nine million dollars to tournament record $34,300,000.

In the 2013 season, the US Open prize money was the highest out of four grand slam tournaments, compared to $30m at the Australian Open, $29m at the French Open, and $34m at the Wimbledon Championships.

Event	W	F	SF	QF	Round of 16	Round of 32	Round of 64	Round of 128	Q3	Q2	Q1
Singles	$2,600,000	$1,300,000	$650,000	$325,000	$165,000	$93,000	$53,000	$32,000	$12,028	$7,911	$4,100
Doubles *	$460,000	$230,000	$115,000	$58,000	$30,000	$18,750	$12,500	—N/a	—N/a	—N/a	—N/a
Mixed doubles *	$150,000	$70,000	$30,000	$15,000	$10,000	$5,000	—N/a	—N/a	—N/a	—N/a	—N/a
Wheelchair singles	$	$	$	$	—N/a	—N/a	—N/a	—N/a	—N/a	—N/a	—N/a
Wheelchair doubles*	$	$	$	—N/a	—N/a	—N/a	—N/a	—N/a	—N/a	—N/a	—N/a
Quad singles	$	$	$	—N/a	—N/a	—N/a	—N/a	—N/a	—N/a	—N/a	—N/a
Quad doubles*	$	$	—N/a	—N/a	—N/a	—N/a	—N/a	—N/a	—N/a	—N/a	—N/a

_{* per team}

==== Bonus prize money ====
Top three players in the 2013 US Open Series received bonus prize money, depending on where they finish in the 2013 US Open, according to money schedule below.

2013 Emirates Airline US Open Series Finish	2013 US Open Finish								Awardees	
2013 Emirates Airline US Open Series Finish	W	F	SF	QF	Round of 16	Round of 32	Round of 64	Round of 128	Awardees	
1st place	$1,000,000	$500,000	$250,000	$125,000	$70,000	$40,000	$25,000	$15,000	(Spain) Rafael Nadal	$1,000,000
1st place	$1,000,000	$500,000	$250,000	$125,000	$70,000	$40,000	$25,000	$15,000	(United States) Serena Williams	$1,000,000
2nd place	$500,000	$250,000	$125,000	$62,500	$35,000	$20,000	$12,500	$7,500	(United States) John Isner	$20,000
2nd place	$500,000	$250,000	$125,000	$62,500	$35,000	$20,000	$12,500	$7,500	(Belarus) Victoria Azarenka	$250,000
3rd place	$250,000	$125,000	$62,500	$31,250	$17,500	$10,000	$6,250	$3,750	(Argentina) Juan Martín del Potro	$6,250
3rd place	$250,000	$125,000	$62,500	$31,250	$17,500	$10,000	$6,250	$3,750	(Poland) Agnieszka Radwańska	$17,500

== Singles players ==
2013 US Open – Men's singles

Champion		Runner-up	
(Spain) Rafael Nadal [2]		(Serbia) Novak Djokovic [1]	
Semifinals out
(Switzerland) Stanislas Wawrinka [9]		(France) Richard Gasquet [8]	
Quarterfinals out
(Russia) Mikhail Youzhny [21]	(United Kingdom) Andy Murray [3]	(Spain) David Ferrer [4]	(Spain) Tommy Robredo [19]
4th round out
(Spain) Marcel Granollers	(Australia) Lleyton Hewitt	(Uzbekistan) Denis Istomin	(Czech Republic) Tomáš Berdych [5]
(Canada) Milos Raonic [10]	(Serbia) Janko Tipsarević [18]	(Switzerland) Roger Federer [7]	(Germany) Philipp Kohlschreiber [22]
3rd round out
(Portugal) João Sousa	(United States) Tim Smyczek (WC)	(Germany) Tommy Haas [12]	(Russia) Evgeny Donskoy
(Germany) Florian Mayer	(Italy) Andreas Seppi [20]	(Cyprus) Marcos Baghdatis	(France) Julien Benneteau [31]
(Russia) Dmitry Tursunov [32]	(Spain) Feliciano López [23]	(United States) Jack Sock	(Kazakhstan) Mikhail Kukushkin
(France) Adrian Mannarino	(United Kingdom) Dan Evans (Q)	(United States) John Isner [13]	(Croatia) Ivan Dodig
2nd round out
(Germany) Benjamin Becker	(Finland) Jarkko Nieminen	(Russia) Alex Bogomolov Jr.	(United States) Rajeev Ram
(Chinese Taipei) Lu Yen-hsun	(Ukraine) Alexandr Dolgopolov	(Germany) Peter Gojowczyk	(Argentina) Juan Martín del Potro [6]
(Argentina) Leonardo Mayer	(United States) Donald Young	(India) Somdev Devvarman	(Germany) Tobias Kamke
(Croatia) Ivo Karlović	(South Africa) Kevin Anderson [17]	(France) Jérémy Chardy	(United States) Denis Kudla
(France) Stéphane Robert	(France) Guillaume Rufin (WC)	(United States) Bradley Klahn (WC)	(Spain) Pablo Andújar
(Argentina) Máximo González (Q)	(Israel) Dudi Sela	(Austria) Andreas Haider-Maurer	(Spain) Roberto Bautista Agut
(Argentina) Carlos Berlocq (WC)	(United States) Sam Querrey [26]	(Canada) Frank Dancevic (Q)	(Australia) Bernard Tomic
(France) Gaël Monfils	(France) Édouard Roger-Vasselin	(Russia) Nikolay Davydenko	(Brazil) Rogério Dutra da Silva (Q)
1st round out
(Lithuania) Ričardas Berankis	(Czech Republic) Lukáš Rosol	(Poland) Łukasz Kubot	(Bulgaria) Grigor Dimitrov [25]
(France) Benoît Paire [24]	(Australia) James Duckworth (WC)	(Estonia) Jürgen Zopp	(Italy) Fabio Fognini [16]
(France) Paul-Henri Mathieu	(Spain) Daniel Gimeno Traver	(Belgium) David Goffin	(France) Nicolas Mahut
(Austria) Jürgen Melzer [29]	(Netherlands) Igor Sijsling	(United States) Brian Baker (WC)	(Spain) Guillermo García López
(France) Michaël Llodra	(Romania) Victor Hănescu	(Slovakia) Martin Kližan	(Argentina) Juan Mónaco [28]
(Belgium) Xavier Malisse	(Slovakia) Lukáš Lacko	(United States) Steve Johnson	(Spain) Nicolás Almagro [15]
(Czech Republic) Radek Štěpánek	(United States) James Blake	(Japan) Go Soeda (Q)	(Germany) Daniel Brands
(Poland) Michał Przysiężny	(Ukraine) Sergiy Stakhovsky	(Czech Republic) Jiří Veselý	(Italy) Paolo Lorenzi
(United States) Michael Russell	(France) Albano Olivetti (Q)	(Germany) Jan-Lennard Struff	(Slovenia) Aljaž Bedene
(France) Florent Serra (Q)	(France) Kenny de Schepper	(Netherlands) Thiemo de Bakker	(Italy) Thomas Fabbiano (Q)
(Poland) Jerzy Janowicz [14]	(Germany) Philipp Petzschner (Q)	(Russia) Andrey Kuznetsov	(Uruguay) Pablo Cuevas (PR)
(Latvia) Ernests Gulbis [30]	(Slovakia) Andrej Martin (LL)	(Brazil) Thomaz Bellucci	(Australia) Nick Kyrgios (Q)
(Slovenia) Grega Žemlja	(Colombia) Santiago Giraldo	(Argentina) Horacio Zeballos	(Argentina) Guido Pella
(Australia) Marinko Matosevic	(Netherlands) Robin Haase	(Spain) Albert Ramos	(Japan) Kei Nishikori [11]
(Italy) Filippo Volandri	(Romania) Adrian Ungur	(Spain) Albert Montañés	(United States) Collin Altamirano (WC)
(Spain) Fernando Verdasco [27]	(United States) Rhyne Williams (WC)	(Canada) Vasek Pospisil	(United States) Ryan Harrison (WC)

2013 US Open – Women's singles

Champion		Runner-up	
(United States) Serena Williams [1]		(Belarus) Victoria Azarenka [2]	
Semifinals out
(China) Li Na [5]		(Italy) Flavia Pennetta	
Quarterfinals out
(Spain) Carla Suárez Navarro [18]	(Russia) Ekaterina Makarova [24]	(Italy) Roberta Vinci [10]	(Slovakia) Daniela Hantuchová
4th round out
(United States) Sloane Stephens [15]	(Germany) Angelique Kerber [8]	(Poland) Agnieszka Radwańska [3]	(Serbia) Jelena Janković [9]
(Italy) Camila Giorgi (Q)	(Romania) Simona Halep [21]	(United States) Alison Riske (WC)	(Serbia) Ana Ivanovic [13]
3rd round out
(Kazakhstan) Yaroslava Shvedova	(United States) Jamie Hampton [23]	(China) Zheng Jie	(Estonia) Kaia Kanepi [25]
(Russia) Anastasia Pavlyuchenkova [32]	(Germany) Sabine Lisicki [16]	(Japan) Kurumi Nara (Q)	(United Kingdom) Laura Robson [30]
(Denmark) Caroline Wozniacki [6]	(Italy) Karin Knapp	(Russia) Maria Kirilenko [12]	(Russia) Svetlana Kuznetsova [27]
(Czech Republic) Petra Kvitová [7]	(Israel) Julia Glushko (Q)	(United States) Christina McHale	(France) Alizé Cornet [26]
2nd round out
(Kazakhstan) Galina Voskoboeva	(Austria) Patricia Mayr-Achleitner (LL)	(France) Kristina Mladenovic	(Poland) Urszula Radwańska
(United States) Venus Williams	(United States) CoCo Vandeweghe (Q)	(Slovakia) Anna Karolína Schmiedlová	(Canada) Eugenie Bouchard
(Spain) María Teresa Torró Flor	(Australia) Ashleigh Barty (WC)	(United States) Bethanie Mattek-Sands	(Argentina) Paula Ormaechea
(Russia) Alisa Kleybanova (PR)	(Romania) Sorana Cîrstea [19]	(France) Caroline Garcia	(Sweden) Sofia Arvidsson
(South Africa) Chanelle Scheepers	(Chinese Taipei) Hsieh Su-wei	(Russia) Elena Vesnina [22]	(Czech Republic) Lucie Šafářová
(Portugal) Michelle Larcher de Brito (Q)	(Croatia) Donna Vekić	(China) Peng Shuai	(Italy) Sara Errani [4]
(Serbia) Bojana Jovanovski	(Germany) Mona Barthel [28]	(United States) Sachia Vickery (WC)	(United States) Victoria Duval (Q)
(Romania) Alexandra Dulgheru	(Ukraine) Elina Svitolina	(Croatia) Ajla Tomljanović (Q)	(Canada) Alexandra Wozniak
1st round out
(Italy) Francesca Schiavone	(Romania) Monica Niculescu	(Russia) Olga Puchkova	(Slovakia) Magdaléna Rybáriková [29]
(Spain) Lara Arruabarrena	(Spain) Anabel Medina Garrigues	(Romania) Irina-Camelia Begu	(Luxembourg) Mandy Minella
(Belgium) Kirsten Flipkens [12]	(Netherlands) Kiki Bertens	(Serbia) Aleksandra Krunić (Q)	(United States) Lauren Davis
(United States) Vania King (WC)	(Switzerland) Stefanie Vögele	(Czech Republic) Karolína Plíšková	(Czech Republic) Lucie Hradecká
(Spain) Sílvia Soler Espinosa	(New Zealand) Marina Erakovic	(Spain) Estrella Cabeza Candela	(France) Virginie Razzano (WC)
(Slovenia) Polona Hercog	(France) Mathilde Johansson	(Japan) Kimiko Date-Krumm	(Russia) Vera Dushevina (Q)
(United States) Madison Keys	(Puerto Rico) Monica Puig	(Romania) Alexandra Cadanțu	(Canada) Sharon Fichman (Q)
(Spain) Lourdes Domínguez Lino	(United States) Shelby Rogers (WC)	(Czech Republic) Petra Cetkovská (PR)	(Belarus) Olga Govortsova
(China) Duan Yingying (Q)	(South Africa) Chanel Simmonds (Q)	(Slovakia) Jana Čepelová	(Czech Republic) Klára Zakopalová [31]
(Germany) Annika Beck	(United States) Grace Min (Q)	(Ukraine) Lesia Tsurenko	(Hungary) Tímea Babos
(Belgium) Yanina Wickmayer	(Greece) Eleni Daniilidou	(Colombia) Mariana Duque Mariño	(United Kingdom) Heather Watson
(United States) Mallory Burdette	(Austria) Yvonne Meusburger	(United States) Nicole Gibbs (WC)	(Australia) Olivia Rogowska (LL)
(Japan) Misaki Doi	(Germany) Andrea Petkovic	(Bulgaria) Tsvetana Pironkova	(Sweden) Johanna Larsson
(Russia) Nadia Petrova [20]	(Croatia) Mirjana Lučić-Baroni (Q)	(United States) Maria Sanchez (WC)	(Australia) Samantha Stosur [11]
(Georgia (country)) Anna Tatishvili	(United States) Varvara Lepchenko	(Germany) Julia Görges	(Slovakia) Dominika Cibulková [17]
(Portugal) Maria João Koehler (Q)	(Australia) Casey Dellacqua (Q)	(Serbia) Vesna Dolonc	(Germany) Dinah Pfizenmaier

== Events ==
=== Seniors ===
==== Men's singles ====
- (Spain) Rafael Nadal defeated (Serbia) Novak Djokovic, 6–2, 3–6, 6–4, 6–1

• This was Nadal's 13th career Grand Slam singles title and his 2nd at the US Open

==== Women's singles ====
- (United States) Serena Williams defeated (Belarus) Victoria Azarenka, 7–5, 6–7^{(6–8)}, 6–1

• This was Williams' 17th career Grand Slam singles title and her 5th at the US Open

==== Men's doubles ====
- (India) Leander Paes / (Czech Republic) Radek Štěpánek defeated (Austria) Alexander Peya / (Brazil) Bruno Soares, 6–1, 6–3

• This was Paes' 8th career Grand Slam doubles title and his 3rd at the US Open
• This was Štěpánek's 2nd career Grand Slam doubles title and his 1st at the US Open

==== Women's doubles ====
- (Czech Republic) Andrea Hlaváčková / (Czech Republic) Lucie Hradecká defeated (Australia) Ashleigh Barty / (Australia) Casey Dellacqua, 6–7^{(4–7)}, 6–1, 6–4

• This was Hlaváčková's 2nd career Grand Slam doubles title and her 1st at the US Open
• This was Hradecká's 2nd career Grand Slam doubles title and her 1st at the US Open

==== Mixed doubles ====
- (Czech Republic) Andrea Hlaváčková / (Belarus) Max Mirnyi defeated (United States) Abigail Spears / (Mexico) Santiago González, 7–6^{(7–5)}, 6–3

• This was Hlaváčková's 1st career Grand Slam mixed doubles title
• This was Mirnyi's 4th career Grand Slam mixed doubles title and his 3rd at the US Open

=== Juniors ===
==== Boys' singles ====
- (Croatia) Borna Ćorić defeated (Australia) Thanasi Kokkinakis, 3–6, 6–3, 6–1

==== Girls' singles ====
- (Croatia) Ana Konjuh defeated (United States) Tornado Alicia Black, 3–6, 6–4, 7–6^{(8–6)}

==== Boys' doubles ====
- (Poland) Kamil Majchrzak / (United States) Martin Redlicki defeated (France) Quentin Halys / (Portugal) Frederico Ferreira Silva, 6–3, 6–4

==== Girls' doubles ====
- (Czech Republic) Barbora Krejčíková / (Czech Republic) Kateřina Siniaková defeated (Switzerland) Belinda Bencic / (Spain) Sara Sorribes Tormo, 6–3, 6–4

=== Wheelchair events ===
==== Wheelchair men's singles ====
- (France) Stéphane Houdet defeated (Japan) Shingo Kunieda, 6–2, 6–4

==== Wheelchair women's singles ====
- (Netherlands) Aniek van Koot defeated (Germany) Sabine Ellerbrock 3–6, 6–2, 7–6^{(7–3)}

==== Wheelchair quad singles ====
- (South Africa) Lucas Sithole defeated (United States) David Wagner, 3–6, 6–4, 6–4

==== Wheelchair men's doubles ====
- (France) Michaël Jérémiasz / (Netherlands) Maikel Scheffers defeated (Argentina) Gustavo Fernández / (Belgium) Joachim Gérard, 6–0, 4–6, 6–3

==== Wheelchair women's doubles ====
- (Netherlands) Jiske Griffioen / (Netherlands) Aniek van Koot defeated (Germany) Sabine Ellerbrock / (Japan) Yui Kamiji, 6–3, 6–4

==== Wheelchair quad doubles ====
- (United States) David Wagner / (United States) Nick Taylor defeated (United Kingdom) Andrew Lapthorne / (South Africa) Lucas Sithole, 6–0, 2–6, 6–3

== Singles seeds ==
The following are the seeded players. Ranking and seeding are according to ATP and WTA rankings on August 19, 2013.

=== Men's singles ===
Seed	Rank	Player	Points Before	Points defending	Points won	Points After	Status
1	1	(Serbia) Novak Djokovic	10,980	1,200	1,200	10,980	Runner-up, lost to (Spain) Rafael Nadal [2]
2	2	(Spain) Rafael Nadal	8,860	0	2,000	10,860	Champion, defeated (Serbia) Novak Djokovic [1]
3	3	(United Kingdom) Andy Murray	8,700	2,000	360	7,060	Quarterfinals lost to (Switzerland) Stanislas Wawrinka [9]
4	4	(Spain) David Ferrer	7,210	720	360	6,850	Quarterfinals lost to (France) Richard Gasquet [8]
5	5	(Czech Republic) Tomáš Berdych	5,075	720	180	4,535	Fourth round lost to (Switzerland) Stanislas Wawrinka [9]
6	6	(Argentina) Juan Martín del Potro	4,740	360	45	4,425	Second round lost to (Australia) Lleyton Hewitt
7	7	(Switzerland) Roger Federer	4,695	360	180	4,515	Fourth round lost to (Spain) Tommy Robredo [19]
8	9	(France) Richard Gasquet	2,625	180	720	3,165	Semifinals lost to (Spain) Rafael Nadal [2]
9	10	(Switzerland) Stanislas Wawrinka	2,610	180	720	3,150	Semifinals lost to (Serbia) Novak Djokovic [1]
10	11	(Canada) Milos Raonic	2,555	180	180	2,555	Fourth round lost to (France) Richard Gasquet [8]
11	12	(Japan) Kei Nishikori	2,405	90	10	2,325	First round lost to (United Kingdom) Dan Evans (Q)
12	13	(Germany) Tommy Haas	2,185	10	90	2,265	Third round lost to (Russia) Mikhail Youzhny [21]
13	14	(United States) John Isner	2,025	90	90	2,025	Third round lost to (Germany) Philipp Kohlschreiber [22]
14	15	(Poland) Jerzy Janowicz	2,110	10	10	2,110	First round lost to (Argentina) Máximo González (Q)
15	16	(Spain) Nicolás Almagro	2,110	180	10	1,940	First round lost to (Uzbekistan) Denis Istomin
16	18	(Italy) Fabio Fognini	2,025	90	10	1,945	First round lost to (United States) Rajeev Ram
17	20	(South Africa) Kevin Anderson	1,740	10	45	1,775	Second round lost to (Cyprus) Marcos Baghdatis
18	21	(Serbia) Janko Tipsarević	1,685	360	180	1,505	Fourth round lost to (Spain) David Ferrer [4]
19	22	(Spain) Tommy Robredo	1,620	45	360	1,935	Quarterfinals lost to (Spain) Rafael Nadal [2]
20	23	(Italy) Andreas Seppi	1,550	10	90	1,630	Third round lost to (Uzbekistan) Denis Istomin
21	24	(Russia) Mikhail Youzhny	1,475	10	360	1,825	Quarterfinals lost to (Serbia) Novak Djokovic [1]
22	25	(Germany) Philipp Kohlschreiber	1,445	180	180	1,445	Fourth round lost to (Spain) Rafael Nadal [2]
23	26	(Spain) Feliciano López	1,435	90	90	1,435	Third round lost to (Canada) Milos Raonic [10]
24	27	(France) Benoît Paire	1,415	45	10	1,380	First round lost to (Russia) Alex Bogomolov Jr.
25	28	(Bulgaria) Grigor Dimitrov	1,375	10	10	1,375	First round lost to (Portugal) João Sousa
26	29	(United States) Sam Querrey	1,310	90	45	1,265	Second round lost to (France) Adrian Mannarino
27	30	(Spain) Fernando Verdasco	1,325	90	10	1,245	First round lost to (Croatia) Ivan Dodig
28	31	(Argentina) Juan Mónaco	1,275	10	10	1,275	First round lost to (Germany) Florian Mayer
29	32	(Austria) Jürgen Melzer	1,425	10	10	1,425	First round lost to (Russia) Evgeny Donskoy
30	33	(Latvia) Ernests Gulbis	1,191	45	10	1,156	First round lost to (Austria) Andreas Haider-Maurer
31	34	(France) Julien Benneteau	1,185	45	90	1,230	Third round lost to (Czech Republic) Tomáš Berdych [5]
32	35	(Russia) Dmitry Tursunov	1,190	16	90	1,264	Third round lost to (France) Richard Gasquet [8]

==== Withdrawn players ====
Rank	Player	Points	Points defending	Points won	New points	Withdrew due to
8	(France) Jo-Wilfried Tsonga	3,470	45	0	3,425	Knee injury
17	(France) Gilles Simon	2,040	90	0	1,950	Pertussis
19	(Croatia) Marin Čilić	1,805	360	0	1,445	Suspension

=== Women's singles ===
Seed	Rank	Player	Points Before	Points defending	Points won	Points After	Status
1	1	(United States) Serena Williams	12,260	2,000	2,000	12,260	Champion, defeated (Belarus) Victoria Azarenka [2]
2	2	(Belarus) Victoria Azarenka	9,505	1,400	1,400	9,505	Runner-up, lost to (United States) Serena Williams [1]
3	4	(Poland) Agnieszka Radwańska	6,335	280	280	6,335	Fourth round lost to (Russia) Ekaterina Makarova [24]
4	5	(Italy) Sara Errani	5,125	900	100	4,325	Second round lost to (Italy) Flavia Pennetta
5	6	(China) Li Na	4,825	160	900	5,565	Semifinals lost to (United States) Serena Williams [1]
6	8	(Denmark) Caroline Wozniacki	3,490	5	160	3,645	Third round lost to (Italy) Camila Giorgi (Q)
7	9	(Czech Republic) Petra Kvitová	3,290	280	160	3,170	Third round lost to (United States) Alison Riske (WC)
8	10	(Germany) Angelique Kerber	3,420	280	280	3,420	Fourth round lost to (Spain) Carla Suárez Navarro [18]
9	11	(Serbia) Jelena Janković	3,125	160	280	3,245	Fourth round lost to (China) Li Na [5]
10	12	(Italy) Roberta Vinci	3,065	500	500	3,065	Quarterfinals lost to (Italy) Flavia Pennetta
11	13	(Australia) Samantha Stosur	3,210	500	5	2,715	First round lost to (United States) Victoria Duval (Q)
12	14	(Belgium) Kirsten Flipkens	2,961	160	5	2,806	First round lost to (United States) Venus Williams
13	15	(Serbia) Ana Ivanovic	2,940	500	280	2,720	Fourth round lost to (Belarus) Victoria Azarenka [2]
14	16	(Russia) Maria Kirilenko	2,620	160	160	2,620	Third round lost to (Romania) Simona Halep [21]
15	17	(United States) Sloane Stephens	2,925	160	280	3,045	Fourth round lost to (United States) Serena Williams [1]
16	18	(Germany) Sabine Lisicki	2,615	5	160	2,770	Third round lost to (Russia) Ekaterina Makarova [24]
17	19	(Slovakia) Dominika Cibulková	2,281	160	5	2,126	First round lost to (Ukraine) Elina Svitolina
18	20	(Spain) Carla Suárez Navarro	2,375	100	500	2,775	Quarterfinals lost to (United States) Serena Williams [1]
19	21	(Romania) Sorana Cîrstea	2,250	100	100	2,250	Second round lost to (Japan) Kurumi Nara (Q)
20	22	(Russia) Nadia Petrova	2,212	280	5	1,937	First round lost to (Israel) Julia Glushko (Q)
21	23	(Romania) Simona Halep	2,450	100	280	2,630	Fourth round lost to (Italy) Flavia Pennetta
22	24	(Russia) Elena Vesnina	2,125	100	100	2,125	Second round lost to (Italy) Karin Knapp
23	25	(United States) Jamie Hampton	1,881	5	160	2,036	Third round lost to (United States) Sloane Stephens [15]
24	26	(Russia) Ekaterina Makarova	1,935	160	500	2,275	Quarterfinals lost to (China) Li Na [5]
25	27	(Estonia) Kaia Kanepi	1,781	0	160	1,941	Third round lost to (Germany) Angelique Kerber [8]
26	28	(France) Alizé Cornet	1,730	100	160	1,790	Third round lost to (Belarus) Victoria Azarenka [2]
27	29	(Russia) Svetlana Kuznetsova	1,679	0	160	1,839	Third round lost to (Italy) Flavia Pennetta
28	30	(Germany) Mona Barthel	1,550	5	100	1,645	Second round lost to (United States) Alison Riske (WC)
29	31	(Slovakia) Magdaléna Rybáriková	1,575	160	5	1,420	First round lost to (Austria) Patricia Mayr-Achleitner (LL)
30	32	(United Kingdom) Laura Robson	1,561	280	160	1,441	Third round lost to (China) Li Na [5]
31	33	(Czech Republic) Klára Zakopalová	1,600	5	5	1,600	First round lost to (Chinese Taipei) Hsieh Su-wei
32	34	(Russia) Anastasia Pavlyuchenkova	1,560	100	160	1,620	Third round lost to (Poland) Agnieszka Radwańska [3]

==== Withdrawn players ====
Rank	Player	Points	Points defending	Points won	New points	Withdrew due to
3	(Russia) Maria Sharapova	8,766	900	0	7,866	Right shoulder bursitis
7	(France) Marion Bartoli	4,365	500	0	3,865	Retired from tennis

== Wild card entries ==
Below are the lists of the wild card awardees entering in the main draws.

=== Men's singles wild card entries ===
1. (United States) Collin Altamirano
2. (United States) Brian Baker
3. (Australia) James Duckworth
4. (United States) Ryan Harrison
5. (United States) Bradley Klahn
6. (United States) Tim Smyczek
7. (France) Guillaume Rufin
8. (United States) Rhyne Williams

=== Women's singles wild card entries ===
1. (Australia) Ashleigh Barty
2. (United States) Nicole Gibbs
3. (United States) Vania King
4. (France) Virginie Razzano
5. (United States) Alison Riske
6. (United States) Shelby Rogers
7. (United States) Maria Sanchez
8. (United States) Sachia Vickery

=== Men's doubles wild card entries ===
1. (United States) James Blake / (United States) Jack Sock
2. (United States) Jarmere Jenkins / (United States) Mac Styslinger
3. (United States) Steve Johnson / (United States) Michael Russell
4. (United States) Bradley Klahn / (United States) Sam Querrey
5. (United States) Austin Krajicek / (United States) Denis Kudla
6. (United States) Alex Kuznetsov / (United States) Bobby Reynolds
7. (United States) Paul Oosterbaan / (United States) Ronnie Schneider

=== Women's doubles wild card entries ===
1. (United States) Mallory Burdette / (United States) Taylor Townsend
2. (United States) Jill Craybas / (United States) CoCo Vandeweghe
3. (United States) Lauren Davis / (United States) Grace Min
4. (Slovakia) Daniela Hantuchová / (Switzerland) Martina Hingis
5. (United States) Allie Kiick / (United States) Sachia Vickery
6. (United States) Melanie Oudin / (United States) Alison Riske
7. (United States) Shelby Rogers / (United States) Maria Sanchez

=== Mixed doubles wild card entries ===
1. (United States) Kaitlyn Christian / (United States) Dennis Novikov
2. (United States) Victoria Duval / (United States) Donald Young
3. (Switzerland) Martina Hingis / (India) Mahesh Bhupathi
4. (United States) Megan Moulton-Levy / (United States) Eric Butorac
5. (United States) Melanie Oudin / (United States) Austin Krajicek
6. (United States) Sabrina Santamaria / (United States) Jarmere Jenkins
7. (United States) Yasmin Schnack / (United States) Eric Roberson
8. (United States) Sloane Stephens / (United States) Jack Sock

== Qualifiers entries ==
=== Men's singles qualifiers entries ===
1. (Kazakhstan) Mikhail Kukushkin
2. (Croatia) Ivo Karlović
3. (France) Florent Serra
4. (Germany) Philipp Petzschner
5. (Brazil) Rogério Dutra da Silva
6. (India) Somdev Devvarman
7. (Italy) Thomas Fabbiano
8. (United States) Donald Young
9. (Australia) Nick Kyrgios
10. (Canada) Frank Dancevic
11. (Germany) Peter Gojowczyk
12. (Japan) Go Soeda
13. (United Kingdom) Dan Evans
14. (Argentina) Máximo González
15. (France) Stéphane Robert
16. (France) Albano Olivetti

The following player received entry as a lucky loser:

1. (Slovakia) Andrej Martin

=== Women's singles qualifiers entries ===
1. (Australia) Casey Dellacqua
2. (Canada) Sharon Fichman
3. (United States) Grace Min
4. (United States) Victoria Duval
5. (United States) CoCo Vandeweghe
6. (China) Duan Yingying
7. (Japan) Kurumi Nara
8. (Portugal) Maria João Koehler
9. (Russia) Vera Dushevina
10. (Croatia) Mirjana Lučić-Baroni
11. (South Africa) Chanel Simmonds
12. (Portugal) Michelle Larcher de Brito
13. (Israel) Julia Glushko
14. (Croatia) Ajla Tomljanović
15. (Serbia) Alexandra Krunić
16. (Italy) Camila Giorgi

The following players received entry as lucky losers:

1. (Austria) Patricia Mayr-Achleitner
2. (Australia) Olivia Rogowska

== Protected ranking ==
The following players were accepted directly into the main draw using a protected ranking:

Men's Singles

- (Uruguay) Pablo Cuevas (PR 54)
- (Estonia) Jürgen Zopp (PR 88)

Women's Singles

- (Czech Republic) Petra Cetkovská (PR 55)
- (Romania) Alexandra Dulgheru (PR 58)
- (Russia) Alisa Kleybanova (PR 24)
- (Canada) Aleksandra Wozniak (PR 41)

== Withdrawals ==
The following players were accepted directly into the main tournament, but withdrew with injuries, suspensions or personal reasons.

Men's Singles

- (Croatia) Marin Čilić → replaced by (Germany) Jan-Lennard Struff
- (United States) Mardy Fish → replaced by (Slovakia) Andrej Martin
- (France) Gilles Simon → replaced by (Austria) Andreas Haider-Maurer
- (Serbia) Viktor Troicki → replaced by (United States) Rajeev Ram
- (France) Jo-Wilfried Tsonga → replaced by (Belgium) David Goffin

Women's Singles

- (France) Marion Bartoli → replaced by (Georgia (country)) Anna Tatishvili
- (Japan) Ayumi Morita → replaced by (Australia) Olivia Rogowska
- (Spain) Garbiñe Muguruza → replaced by (Hungary) Tímea Babos
- (Switzerland) Romina Oprandi → replaced by (Germany) Dinah Pfizenmaier
- (Kazakhstan) Yulia Putintseva → replaced by (Italy) Flavia Pennetta
- (Russia) Maria Sharapova → replaced by (Austria) Patricia Mayr-Achleitner

== Retirements ==
Men's Singles

- (Uruguay) Pablo Cuevas
- (Argentina) Juan Mónaco
- (Germany) Philipp Petzschner
- (France) Guillaume Rufin
- (Russia) Dmitry Tursunov

== Media coverage ==
Country	TV Broadcaster(s)	Notes
Brazil	SporTV, ESPN	
Canada	TSN	
Europe	Eurosport, Eurosport 2	
India	TEN Sports	
Pakistan	TEN Sports	
Philippines	Balls HD	
Qatar	Al Jazeera Sports	Middle East
Romania	Romanian Eurosport	
Hong Kong	Now Sports	
Serbia	Prva, Serbian Eurosport	
United States	CBS, ESPN, Tennis Ch.	

Preceded by 2013 Wimbledon Championships	Grand Slams	Succeeded by 2014 Australian Open
