= 2019 Kentucky Bank Tennis Championships – Women's singles =

Women's singles
- 2019 Kentucky Bank Tennis Championships

Final
- Champion: (South Korea) Kim Da-bin
- Runner-up: (United States) Ann Li
- Score: 6–1, 6–3

Events
| Singles | men | women |
| Doubles | men | women |
- Lexington Challenger

Asia Muhammad was the defending champion, but chose not to participate.

Qualifier Kim Da-bin won the title, defeating Ann Li in the final, 6–1, 6–3.

== Seeds ==
1. (France) Jessika Ponchet (first round, retired)
2. (United States) Ann Li (final)
3. (United States) Robin Anderson (semifinals)
4. (South Korea) Han Na-lae (semifinals, retired)
5. (Australia) Zoe Hives (quarterfinals)
6. (Poland) Magdalena Fręch (second round)
7. (Israel) Deniz Khazaniuk (quarterfinals)
8. (United Kingdom) Katie Swan (quarterfinals)

== Draw ==
Key

- Q = Qualifier
- WC = Wild card
- LL = Lucky loser
- Alt = Alternate
- ITF = ITF entry
- PR = Protected ranking
- SR = Special ranking
- SE = Special exempt
- JE = Junior exempt
- JR = Junior Accelerator Programme entrant
- CO = College Accelerator Programme entrant
- NG = Next Gen Accelerator Program entrant
- w/o = Walkover
- r = Retired
- d = Defaulted

=== Finals ===
Semifinals
Q | (South Korea) Kim Da-bin | 7 | 3
4 | (South Korea) Han Na-lae | 5 | 1^{r}
3 | (United States) Robin Anderson | 3 | 4
2 | (United States) Ann Li | 6 | 6

Final
Q | (South Korea) Kim Da-bin | 6 | 6
2 | (United States) Ann Li | 1 | 3

=== Top half ===
First round
1 | (France) J Ponchet | 4 | 2^{r}
Q | (South Korea) D-b Kim | 6 | 1
(United States) S Marand | 6 | 6
(Japan) H Arakawa | 2 | 3
(United States) E Halbauer | 1^{r}
(China) Y Zhang | 4
(Australia) B Woolcock | 2 | 1
8 | (United Kingdom) K Swan | 6 | 6
4 | (South Korea) N-l Han | 6 | 6
Q | (Italy) V Meliss | 0 | 2
(Oman) F Al-Nabhani | 2 | 4
(United States) H Chang | 6 | 6
Q | (Russia) A Gabueva | 7^{7} | 6
(Australia) L Cabrera | 6^{3} | 2
(United States) A Nefedova | 2 | 0
5 | (Australia) Z Hives | 6 | 6

Second round
Q | (South Korea) D-b Kim | 2 | 6 | 6
(United States) S Marand | 6 | 3 | 1
(China) Y Zhang | 1 | 0
8 | (United Kingdom) K Swan | 6 | 6
4 | (South Korea) N-l Han | 6 | 6
(United States) H Chang | 1 | 4
Q | (Russia) A Gabueva | 6 | 4 | 3
5 | (Australia) Z Hives | 1 | 6 | 6

Quarterfinals
Q | (South Korea) D-b Kim | 6 | 2 | 7^{8}
8 | (United Kingdom) K Swan | 2 | 6 | 6^{6}
4 | (South Korea) N-l Han | 6 | 6^{1} | 6
5 | (Australia) Z Hives | 4 | 7^{7} | 2

Semifinals
Q | (South Korea) D-b Kim | 7 | 3
4 | (South Korea) N-l Han | 5 | 1^{r}

=== Bottom half ===
First round
7 | (Israel) D Khazaniuk | 6 | 2 | 6
(United States) E Navarro | 0 | 6 | 2
(United States) G Brodsky | 5 | 0^{r}
(Japan) J Namigata | 7 | 0
(United States) S Chang | 6 | 6
(United States) J Elie | 2 | 4
WC | (United States) K Fahey | 6 | 4 | 3
3 | (United States) R Anderson | 2 | 6 | 6
6 | (Poland) M Fręch | 6 | 6
WC | (Lithuania) J Mikulskytė | 2 | 3
Q | (United States) A Parks | 4 | 2
(United States) J Loeb | 6 | 6
(Australia) A Myers | 6^{5} | 0^{r}
Q | (United States) P Stearns | 7^{7} | 2
Q | (United Kingdom) E Webley-Smith | 1 | 2
2 | (United States) A Li | 6 | 6

Second round
7 | (Israel) D Khazaniuk | 6 | 6
(Japan) J Namigata | 1 | 0
(United States) S Chang | 0 | 5
3 | (United States) R Anderson | 6 | 7
6 | (Poland) M Fręch | 1 | 7 | 6^{2}
(United States) J Loeb | 6 | 5 | 7^{7}
Q | (United States) P Stearns | 5 | 3
2 | (United States) A Li | 7 | 6

Quarterfinals
7 | (Israel) D Khazaniuk | 3 | 4
3 | (United States) R Anderson | 6 | 6
(United States) J Loeb | 6 | 1 | 1
2 | (United States) A Li | 4 | 6 | 6

Semifinals
3 | (United States) R Anderson | 3 | 4
2 | (United States) A Li | 6 | 6
