= 2021 JSM Challenger of Champaign–Urbana =

- Date: 15 November – 21 November
- Edition: 25th
- Surface: Hard (Indoor)
- Location: Champaign, Illinois, United States

Champions

Singles
- (United States) Stefan Kozlov

Doubles
- (United States) Nathaniel Lammons / (United States) Jackson Withrow
← 2019 ·	JSM Challenger of Champaign–Urbana	· 2022 →

The 2021 JSM Challenger of Champaign–Urbana was a professional tennis tournament played on hard courts. It was the 25th edition of the tournament which was part of the 2021 ATP Challenger Tour. It took place in Champaign, Illinois, United States between November 15 and November 21, 2021.

== Singles main-draw entrants ==
=== Seeds ===
Country	Player	Rank^{1}	Seed
GER	Daniel Altmaier	105	1
USA	Mitchell Krueger	147	2
USA	J. J. Wolf	152	3
AUS	Aleksandar Vukic	172	4
TPE	Jason Jung	173	5
IND	Prajnesh Gunneswaran	180	6
SLO	Blaž Rola	185	7
USA	Stefan Kozlov	188	8

- ^{1} Rankings are as of November 8, 2021.

=== Other entrants ===
The following players received wildcards into the singles main draw:

- (United States) Ezekiel Clark
- (United States) Vasil Kirkov
- (United States) Aleksandar Kovacevic

The following players received entry from the qualifying draw:

- (Netherlands) Gijs Brouwer
- (India) Arjun Kadhe
- (United States) Ben Shelton
- (United States) Keegan Smith

== Champions ==
=== Singles ===
- (United States) Stefan Kozlov def. (Australia) Aleksandar Vukic 5–7, 6–3, 6–4.

=== Doubles ===
- (United States) Nathaniel Lammons / (United States) Jackson Withrow def. (Philippines) Treat Huey / (United States) Max Schnur 6–4, 3–6, [10–6]
