= 2019 JSM Challenger of Champaign–Urbana =

- Date: 11 November – 17 November
- Edition: 24th
- Surface: Hard
- Location: Champaign, Illinois, United States

Champions

Singles
- (United States) J. J. Wolf

Doubles
- (United States) Christopher Eubanks / (United States) Kevin King
← 2018 ·	JSM Challenger of Champaign–Urbana	· 2021 →

The 2019 JSM Challenger of Champaign–Urbana was a professional tennis tournament played on hard courts. It was the twenty-fourth edition of the tournament which was part of the 2019 ATP Challenger Tour. It took place in Champaign, Illinois, United States between November 11 and November 17, 2019.

== Singles main-draw entrants ==
=== Seeds ===
Country	Player	Rank^{1}	Seed
USA	Denis Kudla	114	1
SLO	Blaž Rola	139	2
ECU	Emilio Gómez	148	3
DEN	Mikael Torpegaard	169	4
CAN	Peter Polansky	185	5
USA	Christopher Eubanks	209	6
ARG	Francisco Cerúndolo	251	7
ARG	Juan Pablo Ficovich	253	8
USA	J. J. Wolf	257	9
DOM	Roberto Cid Subervi	264	10
JPN	Kaichi Uchida	280	11
CAN	Filip Peliwo	285	12
USA	JC Aragone	289	13
USA	Sebastian Korda	298	14
USA	Kevin King	311	15
USA	Roy Smith	329	16

- ^{1} Rankings are as of November 4, 2019.

=== Other entrants ===
The following players received wildcards into the singles main draw:

- (United States) Alexander Brown
- (United States) Aleksandar Kovacevic
- (United States) Austin Rapp
- (United States) Keegan Smith
- (United States) Zachary Svajda

The following players received entry from the qualifying draw:

- (United States) William Blumberg
- (United States) Ezekiel Clark

== Champions ==
=== Singles ===
- (United States) J. J. Wolf def. (United States) Sebastian Korda 6–4, 6–7^{(3–7)}, 7–6^{(8–6)}.

=== Doubles ===
- (United States) Christopher Eubanks / (United States) Kevin King def. (United Kingdom) Evan Hoyt / (United States) Martin Redlicki 7–5, 6–3.
