= Martin Redlicki =

American tennis player

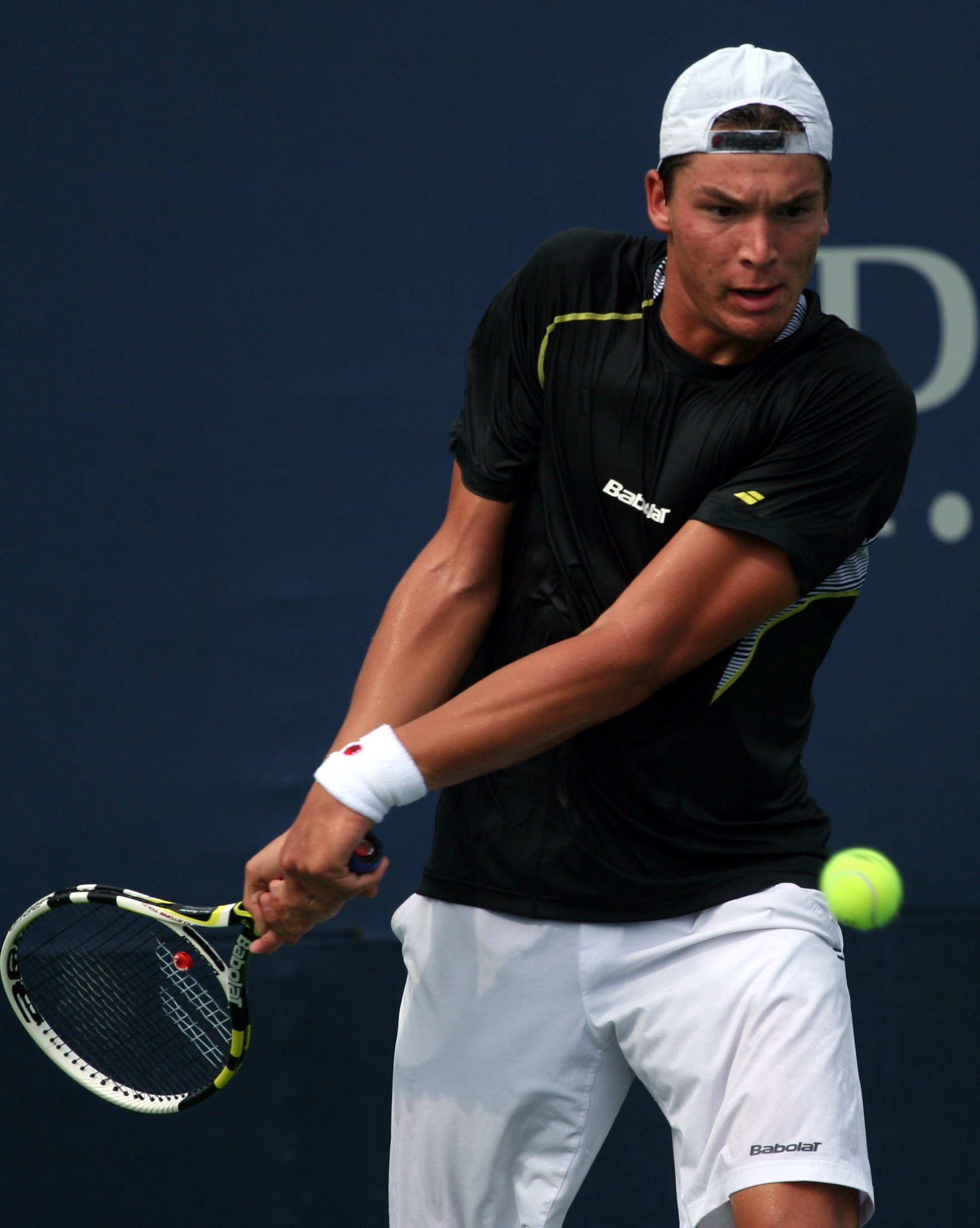
- Redlicki at the 2013 US Open
- Country (sports): United States
- Residence: Boca Raton, Florida, US
- Born: August 24, 1995 (age 30) Hawthorn Woods, Illinois, US
- Height: 1.98 m (6 ft 6 in)
- Turned pro: 2013
- Retired: 2021
- Plays: Left-handed (two handed-backhand)
- Prize money: US $96,335

Singles
- Career record: 0–0
- Career titles: 0
- Highest ranking: No. 381 (April 29, 2019)

Grand Slam singles results
- US Open: Q1 (2018)

Doubles
- Career record: 0–4
- Career titles: 0
- Highest ranking: No. 187 (November 25, 2019)

Grand Slam doubles results
- US Open: 1R (2016, 2018)

Martin Redlicki (born August 24, 1995) is an American former professional tennis player. He achieved a career-high ATP singles ranking of No. 381 in April 2019 and a best doubles ranking of No. 187 in November 2019.

== Junior tennis ==
Redlicki had good results on ITF junior circuit, his most notable being a major jr. doubles title at 2013 US Open, partnering with Kamil Majchrzak.

== Professional career ==
Redlicki made his ATP main draw debut at the 2014 Sony Open Tennis in the doubles event, where he partnered Deiton Baughman. They lost in the first round to Ryan Harrison and Jack Sock, 7–5, 6–4. He played most of his career on ITF and ATP Challenger Circuits, and his best results were two Challenger titles in doubles.

== College years ==
In 2016, Redlicki enlisted to college and played in the Pac-12 Conference for UCLA men's tennis team and the Bruins were crowned champions that year. He was a key name for this feat, when he had a successful partnership with Mackenzie McDonald. They ultimately won the doubles title at the NCAA Tennis Championship that season, defeating Arthur Rinderknech and Jackson Withrow (University of Texas A&M) in the final match.

He was again a winner in the NCAA doubles championship in 2018. He and partner Evan Zhu defeated Martin Joyce and Mikael Torpegaard (Ohio State) for the title. Redlicki was a semifinalist in both singles and doubles that year. He became the third Bruin to have won two doubles championships in UCLA history.

== Personal life ==
Redlicki was born and raised in a Polish American family background. He has an older brother, Michael, who also plays tennis.

== ATP Challenger and ITF Tour finals ==
=== Singles: 4 (1 title, 3 runner-ups) ===
Legend ATP Challenger Tour ITF Futures/WTT (1–3)	Finals by surface Hard (1–3) Clay (–)

Result	W–L	Date	Tournament	Tier	Surface	Opponent	Score
Loss	0–1	Sep 2017	US F30, Claremont	Futures	Hard	(Brazil) Karuê Sell	7–6^{(7–4)}, 4–6, 3–6
Loss	0–2	Sep 2018	US F24, Claremont	Futures	Hard	(United States) Brandon Holt	6–3, 3–6, 2–6
Loss	0–3	Jan 2019	M25 Tucson, US	WTT	Hard	(United States) Govind Nanda	6–4, 6–7^{(2–7)}, 0–6
Win	1–3	Feb 2019	M15 Tucson, US	WTT	Hard	(Brazil) Karuê Sell	6–4, 6–4

=== Doubles: 15 (9 titles, 6 runner-ups) ===
Legend ATP Challenger Tour (2–1) ITF Futures/WTT (7–5)	Finals by surface Hard (9–5) Clay (0–1)

Result	W–L	Date	Tournament	Tier	Surface	Partner	Opponents	Score
Win	1–0	Jul 2019	Lexington Challenger, US	Challenger	Hard	(Ecuador) Diego Hidalgo	(Venezuela) Roberto Maytín (United States) Jackson Withrow	6–2, 6–2
Win	2–0	Sep 2019	Columbus Challenger III, US	Challenger	Hard	(United States) Jackson Withrow	(United States) Nathan Pasha (United States) Max Schnur	6–4, 7–6^{(7–4)}
Loss	2–1	Nov 2019	Champaign-Urbana Challenger, US	Challenger	Hard	(United Kingdom) Evan Hoyt	(United States) Christopher Eubanks (United States) Kevin King	5–7, 3–6

Result	W–L	Date	Tournament	Tier	Surface	Partner	Opponents	Score
Loss	0–1	Feb 2014	US F4, Palm Coast	Futures	Clay	(United States) Taylor Fritz	(Sweden) Markus Eriksson (Sweden) Milos Sekulic	1–6, 1–6
Win	1–1	Jun 2014	US F17, Oklahoma City	Futures	Hard	(United States) Mackenzie McDonald	(Venezuela) Jesús Bandrés (Ecuador) Gonzalo Escobar	4–6, 7–6^{(7–3)}, [10–8]
Loss	1–2	Sep 2014	US F25, Costa Mesa	Futures	Hard	(United States) Mackenzie McDonald	(United States) Hunter Nicholas (United States) Junior Alexander Ore	6–4, 4–6, [8–10]
Win	2–2	Sep 2015	US F17, Costa Mesa	Futures	Hard	(United States) Mackenzie McDonald	(Zimbabwe) Benjamin Lock (United States) Jean-Yves Aubone	6–2, 3–6, [10–5]
Loss	2–3	Sep 2017	US F32, Fountain Valley	Futures	Hard	(Brazil) Karuê Sell	(United States) Elliott Orkin (United States) Ronnie Schneider	walkover
Win	3–3	Jan 2018	US F1, Los Angeles	Futures	Hard	(Brazil) Karuê Sell	(United Kingdom) Luke Bambridge (Mexico) Hans Hach Verdugo	6–4, 6–3
Win	4–3	Aug 2018	US F23, Boston	Futures	Hard	(United States) Evan Zhu	(United States) Paul Oosterbaan (United States) Felix Corwin	7–5, 6–7^{(13–15)}, [10–1]
Win	5–3	Sep 2018	US F25, Laguna Niguel	Futures	Hard	(United States) Nicolas Meister	(United States) Hunter Johnson (United States) Yates Johnson	6–4, 3–6, [10–6]
Win	6–3	Feb 2019	M15 Tucson, US	WTT	Hard	(Brazil) Karuê Sell	(Republic of Ireland) Julian Bradley (United States) Strong Kirchheimer	6–4, 6–1
Win	7–3	Mar 2019	M25 Bakersfield, US	WTT	Hard	(United States) Evan Zhu	(United States) Ian Dempster (United States) Jacob Dunbar	6–1, 3–6, [10–7]
Loss	7–4	Jun 2019	M25 Tulsa, US	WTT	Hard	(United States) Evan Zhu	(United States) Maxime Cressy (Portugal) Bernardo Saraiva	2–6, 6–3, [8–10]
Loss	7–5	Nov 2019	M25 Malibu, US	WTT	Hard	(United States) Austin Rapp	(Colombia) Alejandro Gómez (United States) Junior Alexander Ore	3–6, 7–6^{(16–14)}, [7–10]

== Junior Grand Slam finals ==
=== Doubles: 1 (title) ===
Result	Year	Tournament	Surface	Partner	Opponents	Score
Win	2013	US Open	Hard	(Poland) Kamil Majchrzak	(France) Quentin Halys (Portugal) Frederico Ferreira Silva	6–3, 6–4
