= J. J. Wolf =

American tennis player (born 1998)

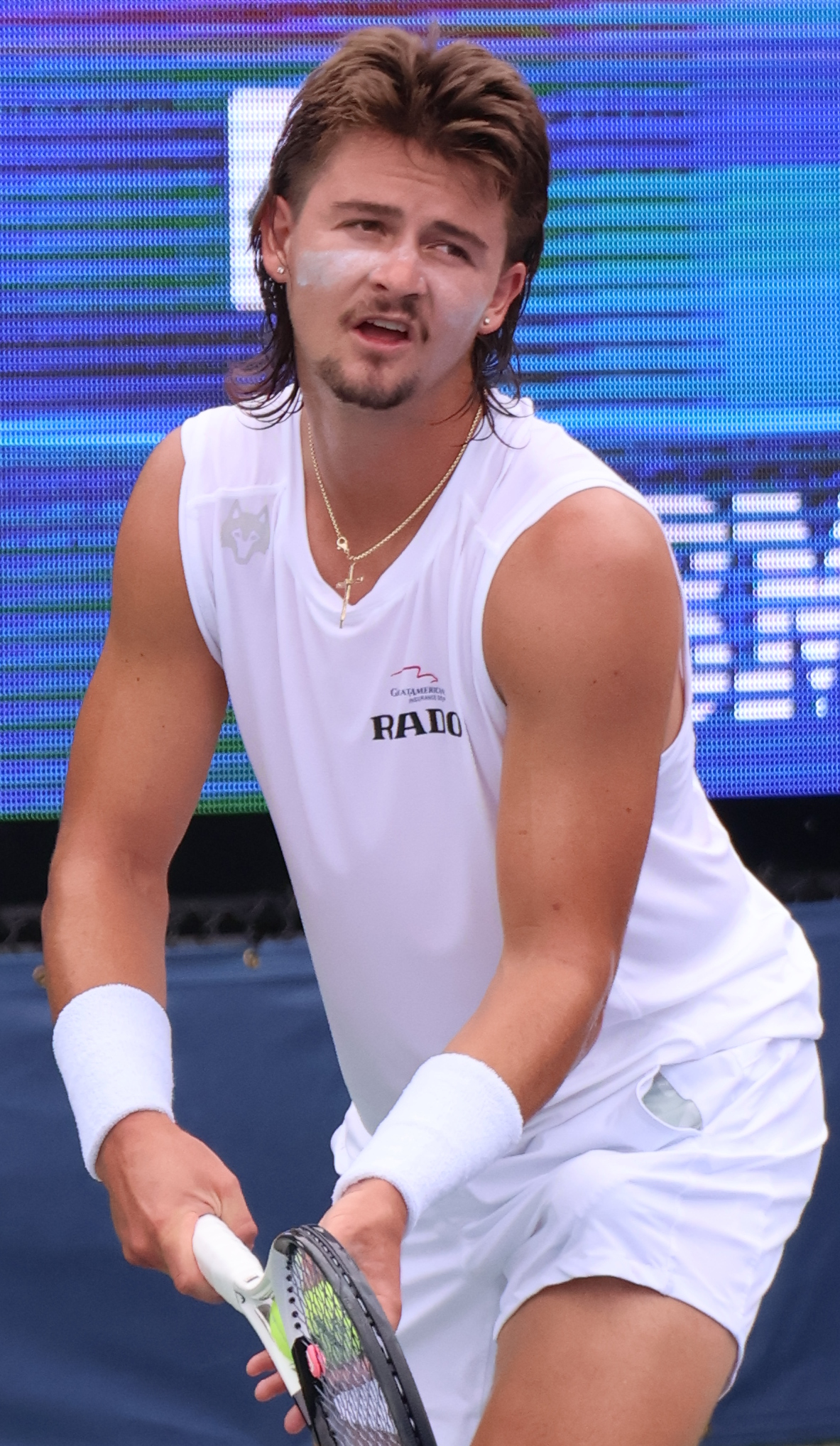
- Wolf at the 2023 US Open
- Full name: Jeffrey John Wolf
- Country (sports): United States
- Residence: Cincinnati, Ohio, US
- Born: December 21, 1998 (age 27) Cincinnati, Ohio, US
- Height: 6 ft 0 in (1.83 m)
- Turned pro: 2019
- Plays: Right-handed (two handed-backhand)
- College: Ohio State University
- Coach: Patrick Thompson, David Kass, Matt Vaughn
- Prize money: US $2,575,943

Singles
- Career record: 45–54
- Career titles: 0
- Highest ranking: No. 39 (February 13, 2023)
- Current ranking: No. 253 (August 31, 2026)

Grand Slam singles results
- Australian Open: 4R (2023)
- French Open: 1R (2023, 2024)
- Wimbledon: 2R (2023)
- US Open: 3R (2020, 2022)

Doubles
- Career record: 1–4
- Career titles: 0
- Highest ranking: No. 543 (May 22, 2023)

Grand Slam doubles results
- Wimbledon: 1R (2023)
- US Open: 1R (2016)
- Last updated on: August 31, 2026.

Jeffrey John "J. J." Wolf (born December 21, 1998) is an American professional tennis player. He has a career-high ATP singles ranking of world No. 39 achieved on February 13, 2023 and a doubles ranking of No. 543, reached on May 22, 2023. Wolf has won six ATP Challenger Tour singles titles.

On the junior tour, Wolf reached a combined ranking of No. 18 on 16 May 2016.

== Early years ==
Wolf was born in Cincinnati, Ohio and attended Cincinnati Country Day School in Indian Hill, Ohio. He is the grandson of NBA basketball coach Charles Wolf.

In 2016, as the nation's third ranked recruit, Wolf committed to playing collegiate tennis for the Ohio State Buckeyes.

== College years ==
Wolf played college tennis at Ohio State University. In his first season, Wolf was named 2017 Big Ten Freshman of the Year and First-Team All Big Ten.

In April 2019, Wolf was the No. 1 ranked college player in the United States. In 2019, Wolf had a combined record of 45–3 between singles and doubles. On April 25, 2019, Wolf was named Big Ten Men's Tennis Athlete of the Year.

== Professional career ==
=== 2016–2017: Major doubles debut ===
Wolf made his Grand Slam main-draw debut at the 2016 US Open in the doubles event, partnering with John McNally. He received a wildcard to play in the men's singles qualifying competition for the 2017 US Open, but did not win a set.

=== 2018: First top 100 win ===
On August 12, 2018, Wolf defeated world No. 85 Jozef Kovalík in the first round of qualifying at the 2018 Western and Southern Open in Mason, Ohio. Wolf won the match 7–6, 7–6. This upset marked Wolf's first win against an ATP top 100 player.

=== 2019: Turning professional ===
Wolf began playing semi-pro tennis in 2016 and three years later, in July 2019, signed with Topnotch Management to play professionally. He turned pro after going 35–2 and earning Big Ten Player of the Year honors as a junior at Ohio State.

In September, Wolf made it to the finals of the Columbus 3 Challenger event, losing to Peter Polansky. He beat fellow rising American Michael Mmoh in the round of 16 and top seed Emilio Gómez in the semifinals.

Wolf reached a career-high of No. 189 in the ATP singles rankings on November 18, 2019, after winning the 2019 Champaign Challenger, defeating Sebastian Korda in a tight two-and-a-half hour match. In January 2020 he started the year by winning the ATP Challenger Tour final in Nouméa, defeating Yuichi Sugita in the final.

=== 2020: Top 150 & Major debut & third round at US Open ===
As of August 2020, Wolf won four Challenger titles and was victorious in three of his last five events dating back to the previous season. He was 14–2 with two titles during the first two months of 2020 before play was suspended due to the pandemic and made his top 150 debut on March 2, 2020, at world No. 144.

Wolf qualified for the Western & Southern Open and was awarded a wildcard to the main draw at the 2020 edition of US Open. In New York, Wolf defeated in the first round 29th seed Guido Pella of Argentina with four sets. The American went on to defeat Spain's Roberto Carballés Baena 6–2, 6–4, 6–3 in round two, before losing in the third round to Russian Daniil Medvedev with straight sets. Wolf is only the third Ohio State Buckeye to reach the third round at the US Open after Francisco González in 1980 and Roger Smith in 1994.

=== 2021: Hiatus after hernia operations ===
In early 2021, Wolf underwent two hernia operations and could not compete for seven months.

=== 2022: First two Masters wins & ATP final, US Open third round, top 60 ===
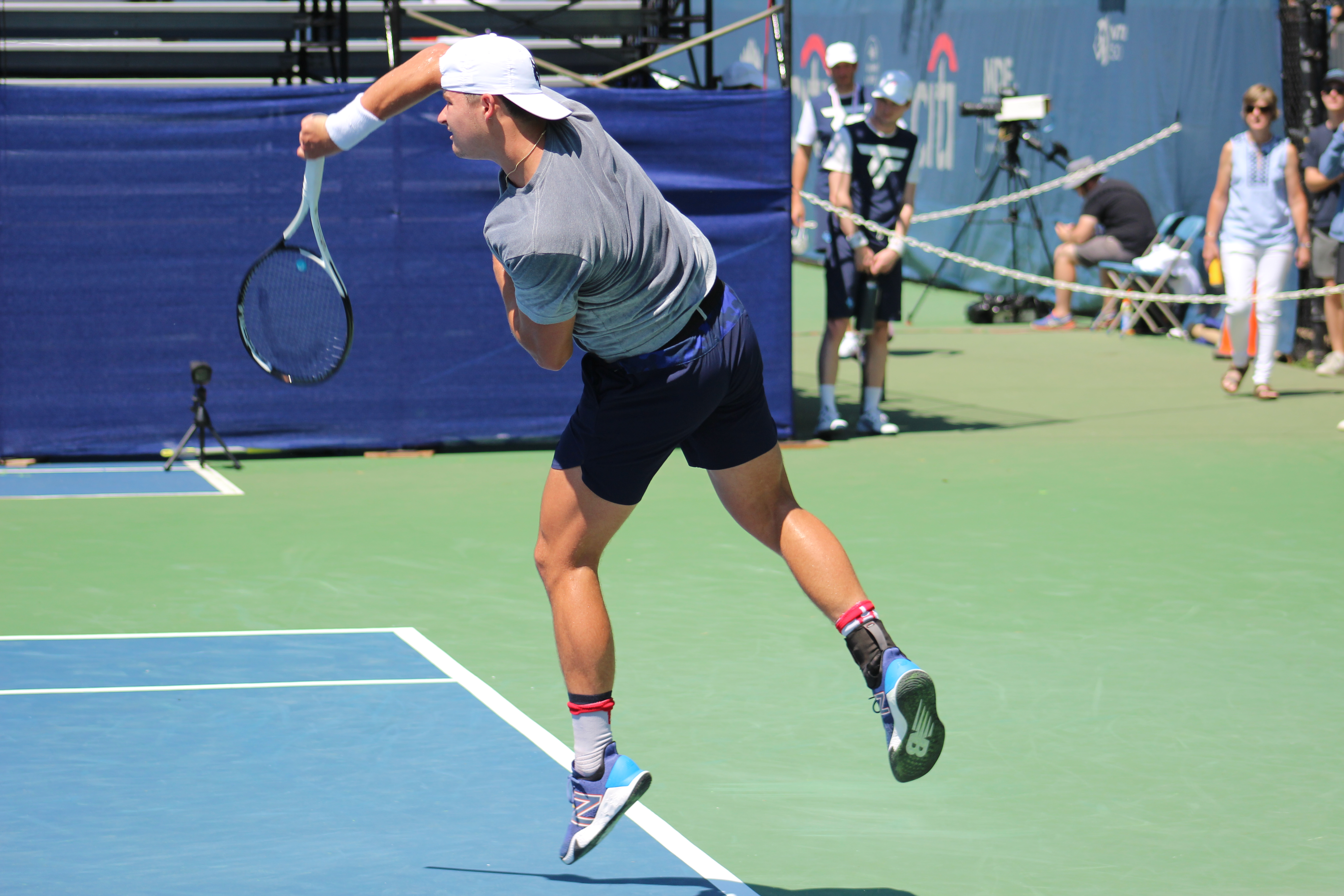
Wolf practicing at Citi Open, August 3, 2022

Ranked 209th at the 2022 Abierto Mexicano Telcel in Acapulco, Wolf reached the second round as a qualifier after defeating World No. 21 Lorenzo Sonego. It was his first ATP win since the 2020 US Open and only the third of his career.

At his next tournament in Indian Wells, Wolf, having qualified for the tournament again, beat Hugo Gaston in straight sets before losing in three sets to 15th seed Roberto Bautista Agut, despite having a match point in the third set. Wolf then reached the semifinals at the Phoenix Challenger, losing to eventual champion Denis Kudla. Wolf then qualified for Miami, and beat Daniel Altmaier in the first round. He lost in three sets to third seed and world No. 5 Stefanos Tsitsipas in the second round.

Wolf reached the top 100 at world No. 99 on August 1, 2022. Also in August, at the 2022 Citi Open, he reached the round of 16 after defeating 6th seed Denis Shapovalov. He reached an ATP 500 quarterfinal for the first time in his career after defeating 9th seed Holger Rune. The same day he lost in his quarterfinal match to top seed Andrey Rublev. As a result, he moved up 15 positions to a new career-high of World No. 84 on August 8, 2022.

At the 2022 US Open, Wolf upset 16th seed Roberto Bautista Agut. Next he defeated Alejandro Tabilo to reach the third round for a second time at this Major. He lost to Nick Kyrgios in straight sets. As a result, he moved into the top 75 in the rankings to a new career-high of No. 72 on September 12, 2022.

At the 2022 Firenze Open, Wolf reached his first ATP semifinal in his career by defeating fourth seed Maxime Cressy in the round of 16 and seventh seed Alexander Bublik in the quarterfinals. He defeated qualifier Mikael Ymer in the semifinals to reach the first final of his career which he lost in straight sets to Félix Auger-Aliassime. As a result, he moved 20 positions up into the top 60 in the rankings at world No. 56 on October 17, 2022.

=== 2023: Australian Open debut & fourth round, Masters fourth round, top 40 ===
At the 2023 Australian Open, Wolf reached the fourth round, defeating Jordan Thompson, 23rd seed Diego Schwartzman and Michael Mmoh before losing to fellow American Ben Shelton in five sets. Following this match, Wolf rose into the top 50 in the ATP rankings at world No. 48 on 30 January 2023.

Wolf reached the third round of a Masters 1000 for the first time on his debut at the Italian Open, defeating 14th seed Hubert Hurkacz.

Seeded sixth at the 2023 Dallas Open, Wolf reached his second tour-level semifinal in his career after defeating qualifier Brandon Holt, Radu Albot and second seed Frances Tiafoe. As a result, he moved into the top 40 in the rankings at No. 39 on 13 February 2023. Seeded ninth at the 2023 Delray Beach Open, he lost in the round of 16 to Adrian Mannarino. Seeded fifth in Houston he lost in the quarterfinals to Gijs Brouwer.

At the 2023 Shanghai Masters, Wolf reached the third round of a Masters 1000 for a second time in his career and also in his debut at this tournament, defeating 15th seed Cameron Norrie. Next he defeated Matteo Arnaldi to reach the fourth round for the first time at a Masters 1000. He qualified at the 2023 Rolex Paris Masters on his debut at this tournament.

=== 2024–2026: Hiatus, Challenger title, back to top 300 ===
Wolf entered the main draw of the 2024 French Open as a lucky loser. In July, at the beginning of the American summer swing, he also entered the main draw at the 2024 Atlanta Open as a lucky loser. He received a wildcard for the Citi DC Open in Washington and defeated lucky loser Zachary Svajda. He finished the 2024 season outside of the top 250, ranked No. 261.

Ranked outside of the top 500 and using protected ranking, Wolf won the title at the 2026 Odlum Brown Vancouver Open after defeating Mark Lajal in straight sets and returned to the top 300 in the rankings on 3 August 2026.

== Personal life ==
Wolf is a supporter of American football team Cincinnati Bengals.

== Performance timeline ==
Key
W	F	SF	QF	#R	RR	Q#	DNQ	A	NH

(W) winner; (F) finalist; (SF) semifinalist; (QF) quarterfinalist; (#R) rounds 4, 3, 2, 1; (RR) round-robin stage; (Q#) qualification round; (DNQ) did not qualify; (A) absent; (NH) not held; (SR) strike rate (events won / competed); (W–L) win–loss record.
To avoid confusion and double counting, these charts are updated at the conclusion of a tournament or when the player's participation has ended.

=== Singles ===
Current through the 2026 Cincinnati Open.

Tournament	2017	2018	2019	2020	2021	2022	2023	2024	2025	2026	SR	W–L	Win %
Grand Slam tournaments
Australian Open	A	A	A	Q2	A	Q2	4R	1R	A	A	0 / 2	3–2	60%
French Open	A	A	A	Q1	A	A	1R	1R	A	A	0 / 2	0–2	0%
Wimbledon	A	A	A	NH	A	A	2R	A	A	A	0 / 1	1–1	50%
US Open	Q1	A	Q1	3R	Q2	3R	1R	Q2	A		0 / 3	4–3	67%
Win–loss	0–0	0–0	0–0	2–1	0–0	2–1	4–4	0–2	0–0	0–0	0 / 8	8–8	50%
ATP Tour Masters 1000
Indian Wells Masters	A	A	Q2	NH	1R	2R	1R	1R	A	A	0 / 4	1–4	20%
Miami Open	A	A	A	NH	A	2R	2R	Q2	A	A	0 / 2	2–2	50%
Monte-Carlo Masters	A	A	A	NH	A	A	A	A	A	A	0 / 0	0–0	–
Madrid Open	A	A	A	NH	A	A	1R	A	A	A	0 / 1	0–1	0%
Italian Open	A	A	A	A	A	A	3R	1R	A	A	0 / 2	2–2	50%
Canadian Open	A	A	A	NH	Q1	A	1R	A	A	A	0 / 1	0–1	0%
Cincinnati Masters	A	Q2	Q2	1R	Q1	1R	1R	Q1	A	1R	0 / 4	0–4	0%
Shanghai Masters	A	A	A	NH			4R	A	A		0 / 1	3–1	75%
Paris Masters	A	A	A	A	A	A	1R	A	A		0 / 1	0–1	0%
Win–loss	0–0	0–0	0–0	0–1	0–1	2–3	6–8	0–2	0–0	0–1	0 / 16	8–16	33%
Career statistics
Tournaments	0	0	0	3	3	13	25	9	0	1	Career total: 54		
Titles	0	0	0	0	0	0	0	0	0	0	Career total: 0		
Finals	0	0	0	0	0	1	0	0	0	0	Career total: 1		
Overall win–loss	0–0	0–0	0–0	2–3	0–3	15–13	26–25	2–9	0–0	0–1	0 / 54	45–54	45%
Year-end ranking	658	364	188	127	174	66	53	261	804		$2,575,943		

== ATP Tour finals ==
=== Singles: 1 (runner-up) ===
Legend Grand Slam (–) ATP 1000 (–) ATP 500 (–) ATP 250 (0–1)	Finals by surface Hard (0–1) Clay (–) Grass (–)	Finals by setting Outdoor (–) Indoor (0–1)

Result	W–L	Date	Tournament	Tier	Surface	Opponent	Score
Loss	0–1	Oct 2022	Firenze Open, Italy	ATP 250	Hard (i)	(Canada) Félix Auger-Aliassime	4–6, 4–6

== ATP Challenger and ITF Tour finals ==
=== Singles: 9 (8 titles, 1 runner-up) ===
Legend ATP Challenger Tour (6–1) ITF Futures/WTT (2–0)	Finals by surface Hard (7–1) Clay (1–0)

Result	W–L	Date	Tournament	Tier	Surface	Opponent	Score
Win	1–0	Jan 2019	Columbus Challenger, US	Challenger	Hard (i)	(Denmark) Mikael Torpegaard	6–7^{(4–7)}, 6–3, 6–4
Loss	1–1	Sep 2019	Columbus Challenger, US	Challenger	Hard (i)	(Canada) Peter Polansky	3–6, 6–7^{(4–7)}
Win	2–1	Nov 2019	Champaign–Urbana Challenger, US	Challenger	Hard (i)	(United States) Sebastian Korda	6–4, 6–7^{(3–7)}, 7–6^{(8–6)}
Win	3–1	Jan 2020	Open Nouvelle-Calédonie, New Caledonia (France)	Challenger	Hard	(Japan) Yūichi Sugita	6–2, 6–2
Win	4–1	Mar 2020	Columbus Challenger, US (2)	Challenger	Hard (i)	(Uzbekistan) Denis Istomin	6–4, 6–2
Win	5–1	Oct 2021	Las Vegas Challenger, US	Challenger	Hard	(United States) Stefan Kozlov	6–4, 6–4
Win	6–1	Aug 2026	Vancouver Open, Canada	Challenger	Hard	(Estonia) Mark Lajal	7–5, 6–1

Result	W–L	Date	Tournament	Tier	Surface	Opponent	Score
Win	1–0	Oct 2017	US F34, Harlingen	Futures	Hard	(United States) Evan Zhu	6–7^{(1–7)}, 6–1, 6–2
Win	2–0	Feb 2026	M15 Naples, US	WTT	Clay	(Colombia) Miguel Tobón	6–2, 6–4
