= 2020 Nur-Sultan Challenger – Doubles =

Doubles
- 2020 Nur-Sultan Challenger

Events
Singles	Doubles
← 2019 ·	Nur-Sultan Challenger	· 2021 →

Harri Heliövaara and Illya Marchenko were the defending champions but chose not to defend their title. The tournament was canceled prior to completion due to the coronavirus pandemic.

== Seeds ==
1. (India) Purav Raja / (India) Ramkumar Ramanathan (first round, withdrew)
2. (Kazakhstan) Andrey Golubev / (Kazakhstan) Aleksandr Nedovyesov
3. (United States) James Cerretani / (Poland) Szymon Walków (quarterfinals)
4. (Chinese Taipei) Hsieh Cheng-peng / (Chinese Taipei) Yang Tsung-hua (withdrew)
5. (Netherlands) Jesper de Jong / (Netherlands) Robin Haase

== Draw ==
=== Key ===
- Q = Qualifier
- WC = Wild card
- LL = Lucky loser
- Alt = Alternate
- SE = Special exempt
- PR = Protected ranking
- ITF = ITF entry
- JE = Junior exempt
- w/o = Walkover
- r = Retired
- d = Defaulted
- SR = Special ranking

First round
1	(India) P Raja (India) R Ramanathan
(Kazakhstan) D Yevseyev (Russia) A Zakharov	w/o
(Kazakhstan) T Khabibulin (Russia) K Kravchuk	6^{1}	6^{5}
(Netherlands) T Griekspoor (Netherlands) B van de Zandschulp	7^{7}	7^{7}
5	(Netherlands) J de Jong (Netherlands) R Haase	6	7
WC	(Russia) M Elgin (Serbia) N Zimonjić	1	5
(Russia) A Karatsev (Russia) P Kotov	6	6
(Sweden) S Freund (Sweden) E Ymer	3	1
(Croatia) N Serdarušić (Spain) B Zapata Miralles	4	4
(Kazakhstan) D Popko (Austria) J Rodionov	6	6
(Slovakia) L Klein (Slovakia) A Molčan
3	(United States) J Cerretani (Poland) S Walków	w/o
WC	(Kazakhstan) Sagadat Ayap (Kazakhstan) G Lomakin	3	2
2	(Kazakhstan) A Golubev (Kazakhstan) A Nedovyesov	6	6

Quarterfinals
(Kazakhstan) D Yevseyev (Russia) A Zakharov	4	6^{7}
(Netherlands) T Griekspoor (Netherlands) B van de Zandschulp	6	7^{9}
5	(Netherlands) J de Jong (Netherlands) R Haase	6	6
(Russia) A Karatsev (Russia) P Kotov	2	3
(Kazakhstan) D Popko (Austria) J Rodionov	5	6	[10]
3	(United States) J Cerretani (Poland) S Walków	7	3	[5]
WC	(Kazakhstan) Timur Maulenov (Kazakhstan) Dostanbek Tashbulatov	1	1
2	(Kazakhstan) A Golubev (Kazakhstan) A Nedovyesov	6	6

Semifinals
(Netherlands) T Griekspoor (Netherlands) B van de Zandschulp
5	(Netherlands) J de Jong (Netherlands) R Haase
(Kazakhstan) D Popko (Austria) J Rodionov
2	(Kazakhstan) A Golubev (Kazakhstan) A Nedovyesov

Final
(Netherlands) (Netherlands)
(Kazakhstan)
