= 2021 Nur-Sultan Challenger II – Doubles =

Doubles
- 2021 Nur-Sultan Challenger II

Final
- Champions: (United States) Nathaniel Lammons (United States) Jackson Withrow
- Runners-up: (United States) Nathan Pasha (United States) Max Schnur
- Score: 6–4, 6–2

Events
Singles	Doubles
← 2021 ·	Nur-Sultan Challenger	· 2022 →

This was the second edition of the tournament in the 2021 tennis season. Denys Molchanov and Aleksandr Nedovyesov were the defending champions but only Nedovyesov chose to defend his title, partnering Viktor Troicki. Nedovyesov lost in the semifinals to Nathan Pasha and Max Schnur.

Nathaniel Lammons and Jackson Withrow won the title after defeating Pasha and Schnur 6–4, 6–2 in the final.

== Seeds ==
1. (United States) Nathaniel Lammons / (United States) Jackson Withrow (champions)
2. (United States) Nathan Pasha / (United States) Max Schnur (final)
3. (Kazakhstan) Aleksandr Nedovyesov / (Serbia) Viktor Troicki (semifinals)
4. (Canada) Peter Polansky / (Canada) Brayden Schnur (semifinals, retired)

== Draw ==
=== Key ===
- Q = Qualifier
- WC = Wild card
- LL = Lucky loser
- Alt = Alternate
- SE = Special exempt
- PR = Protected ranking
- ITF = ITF entry
- JE = Junior exempt
- w/o = Walkover
- r = Retired
- d = Defaulted
- SR = Special ranking

First round
1	(United States) N Lammons (United States) J Withrow	6	4	[10]
(Uzbekistan) D Istomin (Kazakhstan) D Yevseyev	1	6	[7]
(Russia) B Bobrov (Russia) E Donskoy	1	3
WC	(Kazakhstan) T Skatov (Finland) O Virtanen	6	6
4	(Canada) P Polansky (Canada) B Schnur	6	7^{7}
WC	(Uzbekistan) S Fomin (Kazakhstan) Dostanbek Tashbulatov	2	6^{2}
(Kazakhstan) G Lomakin (Ukraine) V Manafov	w/o
(India) S Balaji (Slovenia) B Rola
WC	(Georgia (country)) A Metreveli (Kazakhstan) D Popko	w/o
(Japan) T Ito (United Kingdom) R Peniston
Alt	(Russia) Yan Bondarevskiy (Russia) A Kachmazov	0	1
3	(Kazakhstan) A Nedovyesov (Serbia) V Troicki	6	6
(Germany) J Lenz (Austria) S Ofner	7^{8}	6
(Slovakia) M Kližan (Czech Republic) T Macháč	6^{6}	3
(Portugal) F Ferreira Silva (India) R Ramanathan	4	3
2	(United States) N Pasha (United States) M Schnur	6	6

Quarterfinals
1	(United States) N Lammons (United States) J Withrow	6	6
WC	(Kazakhstan) T Skatov (Finland) O Virtanen	3	2
4	(Canada) P Polansky (Canada) B Schnur	6	6
(Kazakhstan) G Lomakin (Ukraine) V Manafov	3	2
WC	(Georgia (country)) A Metreveli (Kazakhstan) D Popko
3	(Kazakhstan) A Nedovyesov (Serbia) V Troicki	w/o
(Germany) J Lenz (Austria) S Ofner	6^{2}	4
2	(United States) N Pasha (United States) M Schnur	7^{7}	6

Semifinals
1	(United States) N Lammons (United States) J Withrow	0
4	(Canada) P Polansky (Canada) B Schnur	0^{r}
3	(Kazakhstan) A Nedovyesov (Serbia) V Troicki	6^{5}	2
2	(United States) N Pasha (United States) M Schnur	7^{7}	6

Final
1	(United States) N Lammons (United States) J Withrow	6	6
2	(United States) N Pasha (United States) M Schnur	4	2
