= 2019 Nur-Sultan Challenger – Singles =

Singles
- 2019 Nur-Sultan Challenger

Final
- Champion: (Ukraine) Illya Marchenko
- Runner-up: (Germany) Yannick Maden
- Score: 4–6, 6–4, 6–3

Events
Singles	Doubles
Nur-Sultan Challenger	· 2020 →

This was the first edition of the tournament.

Illya Marchenko won the title after defeating Yannick Maden 4–6, 6–4, 6–3 in the final.

== Seeds ==
All seeds receive a bye into the second round.

1. (France) Corentin Moutet (quarterfinals)
2. (Russia) Evgeny Donskoy (quarterfinals)
3. (Tunisia) Malek Jaziri (third round)
4. (Belarus) Ilya Ivashka (third round)
5. (Germany) Yannick Maden (final)
6. (Serbia) Viktor Troicki (second round)
7. (Uzbekistan) Denis Istomin (third round, retired)
8. (Russia) Alexey Vatutin (quarterfinals)
9. (Belgium) Ruben Bemelmans (semifinals)
10. (Kazakhstan) Dmitry Popko (second round)
11. (Italy) Matteo Viola (second round)
12. (Kazakhstan) Aleksandr Nedovyesov (third round)
13. (Russia) Roman Safiullin (second round)
14. (India) Sasikumar Mukund (second round)
15. (Japan) Hiroki Moriya (second round)
16. (Russia) Evgeny Karlovskiy (second round, retired)

== Draw ==
=== Key ===
- Q = Qualifier
- WC = Wild card
- LL = Lucky loser
- Alt = Alternate
- SE = Special exempt
- PR = Protected ranking
- ITF = ITF entry
- JE = Junior exempt
- w/o = Walkover
- r = Retired
- d = Defaulted
- SR = Special ranking

=== Finals ===
Quarterfinals
1	(France) Corentin Moutet	3	4
5	(Germany) Yannick Maden	6	6
(Czech Republic) Tomáš Macháč	6	6
8	(Russia) Alexey Vatutin	4	1
(Ukraine) Illya Marchenko	6	6
(Russia) Konstantin Kravchuk	4	3
9	(Belgium) Ruben Bemelmans	6	3	6
2	(Russia) Evgeny Donskoy	1	6	3

Semifinals
5	(Germany) Yannick Maden	4
(Czech Republic) Tomáš Macháč	1^{r}
(Ukraine) Illya Marchenko	1	7^{7}	6
9	(Belgium) Ruben Bemelmans	6	6^{5}	4

Final
5	(Germany) Yannick Maden	6	4	3
(Ukraine) Illya Marchenko	4	6	6

=== Top half ===
==== Section 1 ====
First round
WC	(Kazakhstan) T Khabibulin	4	1
Q	(Russia) S Danilov	6	6
(Kazakhstan) D Yevseyev	3	7^{7}	3
(Austria) J Rodionov	6	6^{2}	6
(Uzbekistan) K Sultanov	7^{7}	6
LL	(Kazakhstan) Sagadat Ayap	6^{2}	3
(Ukraine) D Kalenichenko	2	5
(Germany) M Zverev	6	7

Second round
1	(France) C Moutet	6	6
Q	(Russia) S Danilov	2	0
(Austria) J Rodionov	6	3	7
13	(Russia) R Safiullin	2	6	5
10	(Kazakhstan) D Popko	1	7	1
(Uzbekistan) K Sultanov	6	5	6
(Germany) M Zverev	7	0	3
5	(Germany) Y Maden	5	6	6

Third round
1	(France) C Moutet	6	4	6
(Austria) J Rodionov	3	6	3
(Uzbekistan) K Sultanov	3	6^{3}
5	(Germany) Y Maden	6	7^{7}

Quarterfinals
1	(France) C Moutet	3	4
5	(Germany) Y Maden	6	6

==== Section 2 ====
First round
Q	(France) F Reboul	6	6^{1}	6
(Germany) J Härteis	4	7^{7}	3
(Russia) A Karatsev	3	4
(Czech Republic) T Macháč	6	6
(Ukraine) V Manafov	6	3	6
(France) H Grenier	3	6	3
(Norway) V Durasovic	6	6
WC	(Kazakhstan) Dostanbek Tashbulatov	4	0

Second round
3	(Tunisia) M Jaziri	3	6	6
Q	(France) F Reboul	6	3	4
(Czech Republic) T Macháč	6	2
16	(Russia) E Karlovskiy	2	1^{r}
12	(Kazakhstan) A Nedovyesov	6	7^{7}
(Ukraine) V Manafov	4	6^{3}
(Norway) V Durasovic	3	4
8	(Russia) A Vatutin	6	6

Third round
3	(Tunisia) M Jaziri	6^{5}	6^{3}
(Czech Republic) T Macháč	7^{7}	7^{7}
12	(Kazakhstan) A Nedovyesov	6	5	2
8	(Russia) A Vatutin	4	7	6

Quarterfinals
(Czech Republic) T Macháč	6	6
8	(Russia) A Vatutin	4	1

=== Bottom half ===
==== Section 3 ====
First round
(France) M Guinard	5	3
(Russia) T Gabashvili	7	6
(Ukraine) I Marchenko	6	7
PR	(Austria) M Neuchrist	4	5
(Russia) K Kravchuk	3	6	6
(Croatia) B Gojo	6	1	4
WC	(Russia) A Iakovlev	0	2
(Japan) K Uchida	6	6

Second round
6	(Serbia) V Troicki	3	3
(Russia) T Gabashvili	6	6
(Ukraine) I Marchenko	6	6
11	(Italy) M Viola	4	3
14	(India) S Mukund	4	2
(Russia) K Kravchuk	6	6
(Japan) K Uchida	1	4
4	(Belarus) I Ivashka	6	6

Third round
(Russia) T Gabashvili	4	2
(Ukraine) I Marchenko	6	6
(Russia) K Kravchuk	1	6	6
4	(Belarus) I Ivashka	6	3	2

Quarterfinals
(Ukraine) I Marchenko	6	6
(Russia) K Kravchuk	4	3

==== Section 4 ====
First round
(Germany) J Lenz	6	7^{7}
WC	(Kazakhstan) B Zhukayev	2	6^{5}
(Russia) I Gakhov	6	6
WC	(Uzbekistan) J Karimov	3	4
(Russia) A Dubrivnyy	3	6	3
(Turkey) C İlkel	6	1	6
(Switzerland) M-A Hüsler	6	4	3
(Czech Republic) Z Kolář	4	6	6

Second round
7	(Uzbekistan) D Istomin	7	6
(Germany) J Lenz	5	1
(Russia) I Gakhov	4	3
9	(Belgium) R Bemelmans	6	6
15	(Japan) H Moriya	3	3
(Turkey) C İlkel	6	6
(Czech Republic) Z Kolář	6^{3}	6	6^{5}
2	(Russia) E Donskoy	7^{7}	4	7^{7}

Third round
7	(Uzbekistan) D Istomin	4	6^{r}
9	(Belgium) R Bemelmans	6	6
(Turkey) C İlkel	4	2
2	(Russia) E Donskoy	6	6

Quarterfinals
9	(Belgium) R Bemelmans	6	3	6
2	(Russia) E Donskoy	1	6	3
