= 2019 Las Vegas Challenger – Doubles =

Doubles
- 2019 Las Vegas Challenger

Final
- Champions: (Philippines) Ruben Gonzales (South Africa) Ruan Roelofse
- Runners-up: (United States) Nathan Pasha (United States) Max Schnur
- Score: 2–6, 6–3, [10–8]

Events
Singles	Doubles
- Las Vegas Challenger

Marcelo Arévalo and Roberto Maytín were the defending champions but chose to defend their title with different partners. Arévalo partnered Miguel Ángel Reyes-Varela but lost in the first round to Ruben Gonzales and Ruan Roelofse. Maytín partnered Robert Galloway but lost in the first round to Nathan Pasha and Max Schnur.

Gonzales and Roelofse won the title after defeating Pasha and Schnur 2–6, 6–3, [10–8] in the final.

== Seeds ==
1. (El Salvador) Marcelo Arévalo / (Mexico) Miguel Ángel Reyes-Varela (first round)
2. (United States) Robert Galloway / (Venezuela) Roberto Maytín (first round)
3. (United States) Evan King / (United States) Hunter Reese (semifinals)
4. (Ecuador) Gonzalo Escobar / (Ecuador) Roberto Quiroz (quarterfinals)

== Draw ==
Key

- Q = Qualifier
- WC = Wild card
- LL = Lucky loser
- Alt = Alternate
- ITF = ITF entry
- PR = Protected ranking
- SR = Special ranking
- SE = Special exempt
- JE = Junior exempt
- JR = Junior Accelerator Programme entrant
- CO = College Accelerator Programme entrant
- NG = Next Gen Accelerator Program entrant
- w/o = Walkover
- r = Retired
- d = Defaulted

First round
1	(El Salvador) M Arévalo (Mexico) MÁ Reyes-Varela	6	4	[8]
(Philippines) R Gonzales (South Africa) R Roelofse	4	6	[10]
WC	(United States) Alex Kobelt (South Africa) Jordan Sauer	3	4
WC	(United States) S Kozlov (United States) Jack Vance	6	6
3	(United States) E King (United States) H Reese	3	7	[10]
WC	(Moldova) A Cozbinov (United States) Evan Song	6	5	[7]
(United States) M Krueger (Slovenia) B Rola	7	6
(Japan) T Daniel (United States) JP Fruttero	5	2
(United States) J Withrow (United States) D Young	7^{7}	6
(Mexico) H Hach Verdugo (United States) D Novikov	6^{4}	3
(Dominican Republic) R Cid Subervi (Kazakhstan) D Popko	6	3	[7]
4	(Ecuador) G Escobar (Ecuador) R Quiroz	2	6	[10]
(United States) A Lawson (United States) Ma Redlicki	6^{8}	6	[9]
(Barbados) D King (Canada) P Polansky	7^{10}	4	[11]
(United States) N Pasha (United States) M Schnur	4	6	[10]
2	(United States) R Galloway (Venezuela) R Maytín	6	4	[5]

Quarterfinals
(Philippines) R Gonzales (South Africa) R Roelofse	4	6	[10]
WC	(United States) S Kozlov (United States) Jac Vance	6	3	[7]
3	(United States) E King (United States) H Reese	4	6	[10]
(United States) M Krueger (Slovenia) B Rola	6	3	[2]
(United States) J Withrow (United States) D Young	6	6
4	(Ecuador) G Escobar (Ecuador) R Quiroz	2	3
(Barbados) D King (Canada) P Polansky
(United States) N Pasha (United States) M Schnur	w/o

Semifinals
(Philippines) R Gonzales (South Africa) R Roelofse	6	3	[10]
3	(United States) E King (United States) H Reese	2	6	[4]
(United States) J Withrow (United States) D Young	6^{5}	3
(United States) N Pasha (United States) M Schnur	7^{7}	6

Final
(Philippines) R Gonzales (South Africa) R Roelofse	2	6	[10]
(United States) N Pasha (United States) M Schnur	6	3	[8]
