= 2020 Nur-Sultan Challenger – Singles =

Singles
- 2020 Nur-Sultan Challenger

Events
Singles	Doubles
← 2019 ·	Nur-Sultan Challenger	· 2021 →

Illya Marchenko was the defending champion. The tournament was canceled prior to completion due to the coronavirus pandemic.

== Seeds ==
All seeds receive a bye into the second round.

1. (Egypt) Mohamed Safwat (third round)
2. (Germany) Yannick Maden (second round, withdrew)
3. (Belgium) Kimmer Coppejans
4. (Austria) Jurij Rodionov (third round)
5. (Netherlands) Robin Haase (second round)
6. (Denmark) Mikael Torpegaard (third round, withdrew)
7. (Kazakhstan) Dmitry Popko (second round)
8. (Netherlands) Botic van de Zandschulp (third round)
9. (France) Enzo Couacaud (second round, withdrew)
10. (India) Ramkumar Ramanathan (second round)
11. (Russia) Roman Safiullin
12. (Portugal) Frederico Ferreira Silva (second round, retired)
13. (Netherlands) Tallon Griekspoor
14. (Sweden) Elias Ymer (third round)
15. (Ukraine) Illya Marchenko
16. (Spain) Bernabé Zapata Miralles

== Draw ==
=== Key ===
- Q = Qualifier
- WC = Wild card
- LL = Lucky loser
- Alt = Alternate
- SE = Special exempt
- PR = Protected ranking
- ITF = ITF entry
- JE = Junior exempt
- w/o = Walkover
- r = Retired
- d = Defaulted
- SR = Special ranking

=== Finals ===
Quarterfinals
13	(Netherlands) Tallon Griekspoor
(Russia) Pavel Kotov
16	(Spain) Bernabé Zapata Miralles
(Russia) Aslan Karatsev
11	(Russia) Roman Safiullin
3	(Belgium) Kimmer Coppejans
(Netherlands) Jesper de Jong
15	(Ukraine) Illya Marchenko

Semifinals

Final

=== Top half ===
==== Section 1 ====
First round
(Kazakhstan) G Lomakin	5	6	6
(Kazakhstan) Sagadat Ayap	7	1	2
(Croatia) N Serdarušić	6	6
Alt	(Belarus) Aliaksandr Bulitski	2	2
(Czech Republic) M Vrbenský	3	3
(Germany) M Moraing	6	6
WC	(Kazakhstan) Dostanbek Tashbulatov	4	2
(Russia) P Kotov	6	6

Second round
1	(Egypt) M Safwat	6	6
(Kazakhstan) G Lomakin	2	4
(Croatia) N Serdarušić	3	6^{5}
13	(Netherlands) T Griekspoor	6	7^{7}
9	(France) E Couacaud
(Germany) M Moraing	w/o
(Russia) P Kotov	6	7^{7}
7	(Kazakhstan) D Popko	3	6^{4}

Third round
1	(Egypt) M Safwat	1	6^{8}
13	(Netherlands) T Griekspoor	6	7^{10}
(Germany) M Moraing
(Russia) P Kotov	w/o

Quarterfinals
13	(Netherlands) T Griekspoor
(Russia) P Kotov

==== Section 2 ====
First round
WC	(Kazakhstan) Bekzat Usipbekov	1	0
(Germany) T Kamke	6	6
(Kazakhstan) A Golubev	6^{3}	4
(Norway) V Durasovic	7^{7}	6
(Belgium) A De Greef	6	2	6
(Slovakia) A Molčan	2	6	2
(Czech Republic) T Macháč	7^{7}	4	3
(Russia) A Karatsev	6^{2}	6	6

Second round
4	(Austria) J Rodionov	6	7^{7}
(Germany) T Kamke	3	6^{3}
(Norway) V Durasovic	1	4
16	(Spain) B Zapata Miralles	6	6
12	(Portugal) F Ferreira Silva	0^{r}
(Belgium) A De Greef	4
(Russia) A Karatsev	7^{7}	6
5	(Netherlands) R Haase	6^{5}	1

Third round
4	(Austria) J Rodionov	2	2
16	(Spain) B Zapata Miralles	6	6
(Belgium) A De Greef	1	0^{r}
(Russia) A Karatsev	6	2

Quarterfinals
16	(Spain) B Zapata Miralles
(Russia) A Karatsev

=== Bottom half ===
==== Section 3 ====
First round
WC	(Kazakhstan) T Khabibulin	6	6^{3}	3
Alt	(Sweden) S Freund	3	7^{7}	6
(Kazakhstan) A Nedovyesov	6	6
WC	(Kazakhstan) Timur Maulenov	2	2
Alt	(Russia) M Elgin	3	1
Alt	(Poland) S Walków	6	6
Alt	(Kazakhstan) Rostislav Galfinger	0	1
(Slovakia) L Klein	6	6

Second round
8	(Netherlands) B van de Zandschulp	6	7
Alt	(Sweden) S Freund	2	5
(Kazakhstan) A Nedovyesov
11	(Russia) R Safiullin	w/o
14	(Sweden) E Ymer	6	7^{9}
Alt	(Poland) S Walków	1	6^{7}
(Slovakia) L Klein	6	4	1
3	(Belgium) K Coppejans	3	6	6

Third round
8	(Netherlands) B van de Zandschulp	3	6	0
11	(Russia) R Safiullin	6	4	6
14	(Sweden) E Ymer	6^{4}	6	2
3	(Belgium) K Coppejans	7^{7}	1	6

Quarterfinals
11	(Russia) R Safiullin
3	(Belgium) K Coppejans

==== Section 4 ====
First round
(Russia) K Kravchuk	4	4
(Kazakhstan) D Yevseyev	6	6
(Netherlands) J de Jong	6	6
Alt	(Ukraine) Anatoliy Petrenko	0	2
(Uzbekistan) S Fayziev	6	7^{8}
Alt	(Serbia) N Zimonjić	1	6^{6}
(Russia) A Zakharov	6	6
WC	(Kazakhstan) Danil Ozernoy	2	2

Second round
6	(Denmark) M Torpegaard	6	7^{9}
(Kazakhstan) D Yevseyev	1	6^{7}
(Netherlands) J de Jong	6	6
10	(India) R Ramanathan	2	2
15	(Ukraine) I Marchenko	6	6
(Uzbekistan) S Fayziev	1	4
(Russia) A Zakharov	w/o
2	(Germany) Y Maden

Third round
6	(Denmark) M Torpegaard
(Netherlands) J de Jong	w/o
15	(Ukraine) I Marchenko	7	7^{7}
(Russia) A Zakharov	5	6^{2}

Quarterfinals
(Netherlands) J de Jong
15	(Ukraine) I Marchenko
