= 2021 Nur-Sultan Challenger II – Singles =

Singles
- 2021 Nur-Sultan Challenger II

Final
- Champion: (Czech Republic) Tomáš Macháč
- Runner-up: (Austria) Sebastian Ofner
- Score: 4–6, 6–4, 6–4

Events
Singles	Doubles
← 2021 ·	Nur-Sultan Challenger	· 2022 →

This was the second of two editions of the tournament in the 2021 tennis season. Mackenzie McDonald was the defending champion but lost in the second round to Tomáš Macháč.

Macháč won the title after defeating Sebastian Ofner 4–6, 6–4, 6–4 in the final.

== Seeds ==
1. (South Korea) Kwon Soon-woo (quarterfinals)
2. (Finland) Emil Ruusuvuori (first round)
3. (Kazakhstan) Mikhail Kukushkin (first round)
4. (Australia) James Duckworth (quarterfinals)
5. (Japan) Taro Daniel (semifinals)
6. (Russia) Evgeny Donskoy (first round)
7. (Switzerland) Henri Laaksonen (first round)
8. (India) Prajnesh Gunneswaran (semifinals)

== Draw ==
=== Key ===
- Q = Qualifier
- WC = Wild card
- LL = Lucky loser
- Alt = Alternate
- SE = Special exempt
- PR = Protected ranking
- ITF = ITF entry
- JE = Junior exempt
- w/o = Walkover
- r = Retired
- d = Defaulted
- SR = Special ranking

=== Finals ===
Semifinals
(Czech Republic) Tomáš Macháč	6	1	6
8	(India) Prajnesh Gunneswaran	3	6	2
(Austria) Sebastian Ofner	6	6
5	(Japan) Taro Daniel	3	4

Final
(Czech Republic) Tomáš Macháč	4	6	6
(Austria) Sebastian Ofner	6	4	4

=== Top half ===
First round
1	(South Korea) S-w Kwon	7	6
(Slovenia) B Rola	5	2
(Canada) P Polansky	7^{7}	4
LL	(United States) U Blanch	6^{2}	3^{r}
(United States) M McDonald	6	4	6
(Canada) B Schnur	3	6	4
(Czech Republic) T Macháč	7	6
7	(Switzerland) H Laaksonen	5	2
4	(Australia) J Duckworth	6	5	7
Q	(Russia) A Kachmazov	4	7	5
WC	(Kazakhstan) A Nedovyesov	5	3
Q	(Ukraine) V Manafov	7	6
WC	(Kazakhstan) D Yevseyev	4	6	3
(Japan) T Ito	6	2	6
LL	(Germany) J Lenz	6	2	3
8	(India) P Gunneswaran	3	6	6

Second round
1	(South Korea) S-w Kwon	7^{9}	6
(Canada) P Polansky	6^{7}	4
(United States) M McDonald	4	1
(Czech Republic) T Macháč	6	6
4	(Australia) J Duckworth	6	6^{5}	7
Q	(Ukraine) V Manafov	2	7^{7}	5
(Japan) T Ito	3	0^{r}
8	(India) P Gunneswaran	6	2

Quarterfinals
1	(South Korea) S-w Kwon	2	1
(Czech Republic) T Macháč	6	6
4	(Australia) J Duckworth	4	6	6^{1}
8	(India) P Gunneswaran	6	2	7^{7}

Semifinals
(Czech Republic) T Macháč	6	1	6
8	(India) P Gunneswaran	3	6	2

=== Bottom half ===
First round
6	(Russia) E Donskoy	2	4
(Austria) S Ofner	6	6
(Kazakhstan) D Popko	4	4
WC	(Kazakhstan) T Skatov	6	6
(India) R Ramanathan	6	3	6
(France) H Grenier	4	6	3
(Portugal) F Ferreira Silva	6	7
3	(Kazakhstan) M Kukushkin	3	5
5	(Japan) T Daniel	6	6
Q	(United Kingdom) R Peniston	2	4
(France) A Müller	3	1^{r}
(Uzbekistan) D Istomin	6	3
Q	(Chinese Taipei) T-l Wu	6	4	7^{7}
(Slovakia) M Kližan	3	6	6^{5}
(Serbia) V Troicki	6	6
2	(Finland) E Ruusuvuori	4	2

Second round
(Austria) S Ofner	6	7^{7}
WC	(Kazakhstan) T Skatov	3	6^{4}
(India) R Ramanathan	4	5
(Portugal) F Ferreira Silva	6	7
5	(Japan) T Daniel	6	6
(Uzbekistan) D Istomin	2	4
Q	(Chinese Taipei) T-l Wu	6	7^{10}
(Serbia) V Troicki	3	6^{8}

Quarterfinals
(Austria) S Ofner	7^{7}	4	7
(Portugal) F Ferreira Silva	6^{2}	6	5
5	(Japan) T Daniel	6	6
Q	(Chinese Taipei) T-l Wu	2	1

Semifinals
(Austria) S Ofner	6	6
5	(Japan) T Daniel	3	4
