= 2021 Nur-Sultan Challenger =

2021 professional tennis tournament

- Date: 22–28 February
- Edition: 3rd
- Surface: Hard (Indoor)
- Location: Nur-Sultan, Kazakhstan

Champions

Singles
- (United States) Mackenzie McDonald

Doubles
- (Ukraine) Denys Molchanov / (Kazakhstan) Aleksandr Nedovyesov
← 2020 ·	Nur-Sultan Challenger	· 2021 →

The 2021 Nur-Sultan Challenger was a professional tennis tournament played on indoor hard courts. It was the third edition of the tournament which was part of the 2021 ATP Challenger Tour. It took place in Nur-Sultan, Kazakhstan between 22 and 28 February 2021.

== Singles main-draw entrants ==
=== Seeds ===
Country	Player	Rank^{1}	Seed
KAZ	Mikhail Kukushkin	90	1
RUS	Evgeny Donskoy	123	2
~~GER~~	~~Cedrik-Marcel Stebe~~	~~129~~	~~3~~
IND	Prajnesh Gunneswaran	131	4
SUI	Henri Laaksonen	139	5
AUT	Jurij Rodionov	152	6
SVK	Martin Kližan	158	7
SLO	Blaž Rola	159	8

- ^{1} Rankings are as of 15 February 2021.

=== Other entrants ===
The following players received wildcards into the singles main draw:

- (Kazakhstan) Timofey Skatov
- (Kazakhstan) Dostanbek Tashbulatov
- (Kazakhstan) Denis Yevseyev

The following players received entry into the singles main draw as alternates:

- (United States) Ulises Blanch
- (Chinese Taipei) Wu Tung-lin

The following players received entry from the qualifying draw:

- (Russia) Bogdan Bobrov
- (Russia) Pavel Kotov
- (Ukraine) Vladyslav Manafov
- (United Kingdom) Ryan Peniston

The following players received entry as lucky losers:

- (Russia) Ivan Nedelko
- (Ecuador) Roberto Quiroz

== Champions ==
=== Singles ===
- (United States) Mackenzie McDonald def. (Austria) Jurij Rodionov 6–1, 6–2.

=== Doubles ===
- (Ukraine) Denys Molchanov / (Kazakhstan) Aleksandr Nedovyesov def. (United States) Nathan Pasha / (United States) Max Schnur 6–4, 6–4.
