= 2021 Nur-Sultan Challenger – Singles =

Singles
- 2021 Nur-Sultan Challenger

Final
- Champion: (United States) Mackenzie McDonald
- Runner-up: (Austria) Jurij Rodionov
- Score: 6–1, 6–2

Events
Singles	Doubles
← 2020 ·	Nur-Sultan Challenger	· 2021 →

There was no defending champion as the last edition of the tournament was canceled due to the COVID-19 pandemic.

Mackenzie McDonald won the title after defeating Jurij Rodionov 6–1, 6–2 in the final.

== Seeds ==
1. (Kazakhstan) Mikhail Kukushkin (first round)
2. (Russia) Evgeny Donskoy (first round)
3. (Germany) Cedrik-Marcel Stebe (withdrew)
4. (India) Prajnesh Gunneswaran (semifinals)
5. (Switzerland) Henri Laaksonen (semifinals)
6. (Austria) Jurij Rodionov (final)
7. (Slovakia) Martin Kližan (quarterfinals)
8. (Slovenia) Blaž Rola (first round)

== Draw ==
=== Key ===
- Q = Qualifier
- WC = Wild card
- LL = Lucky loser
- Alt = Alternate
- SE = Special exempt
- PR = Protected ranking
- ITF = ITF entry
- JE = Junior exempt
- w/o = Walkover
- r = Retired
- d = Defaulted
- SR = Special ranking

=== Finals ===
Semifinals
(United States) Mackenzie McDonald	6	6
5	(Switzerland) Henri Laaksonen	2	1
4	(India) Prajnesh Gunneswaran	2	6	3
6	(Austria) Jurij Rodionov	6	3	6

Final
(United States) Mackenzie McDonald	6	6
6	(Austria) Jurij Rodionov	1	2

=== Top half ===
First round
1	(Kazakhstan) M Kukushkin	5	5
(United States) M McDonald	7	7
(Uzbekistan) D Istomin	6^{6}	6	6
WC	(Kazakhstan) D Yevseyev	7^{8}	3	3
(Portugal) F Ferreira Silva	6	6
(Austria) S Ofner	3	4
Q	(Russia) P Kotov	6	7^{9}
8	(Slovenia) B Rola	4	6^{7}
Q	(Russia) B Bobrov	2	1
(Poland) K Żuk	6	6
Alt	(Chinese Taipei) T-l Wu	6	7
(France) H Grenier	4	5
Q	(United Kingdom) R Peniston	3	6	4
(Croatia) B Gojo	6	1	6
LL	(Ecuador) R Quiroz	4	2
5	(Switzerland) H Laaksonen	6	6

Second round
(United States) M McDonald	6	6
(Uzbekistan) D Istomin	2	3
(Portugal) F Ferreira Silva	6	3	6
Q	(Russia) P Kotov	1	6	4
(Poland) K Żuk	6	4
Alt	(Chinese Taipei) T-l Wu	3	2^{r}
(Croatia) B Gojo	6	5	2
5	(Switzerland) H Laaksonen	1	7	6

Quarterfinals
(United States) M McDonald	6	3	7^{7}
(Portugal) F Ferreira Silva	4	6	6^{3}
(Poland) K Żuk	4	3
5	(Switzerland) H Laaksonen	6	6

Semifinals
(United States) M McDonald	6	6
5	(Switzerland) H Laaksonen	2	1

=== Bottom half ===
First round
7	(Slovakia) M Kližan	6	4	7^{7}
WC	(Kazakhstan) T Skatov	4	6	6^{5}
(Kazakhstan) D Popko	4	6	6^{7}
Alt	(United States) U Blanch	6	2	7^{9}
(France) A Müller	6^{8}	6	1
(Canada) B Schnur	7^{10}	3	6
WC	(Kazakhstan) Dostanbek Tashbulatov	2	3
4	(India) P Gunneswaran	6	6
6	(Austria) J Rodionov	6	6
LL	(Russia) I Nedelko	3	3
(Japan) T Ito	6	6
Q	(Ukraine) V Manafov	4	4
(Canada) P Polansky	3	4
(Germany) M Marterer	6	6
(Czech Republic) T Macháč	6	3	6
2	(Russia) E Donskoy	3	6	1

Second round
7	(Slovakia) M Kližan	6^{7}	6	7^{7}
Alt	(United States) U Blanch	7^{9}	2	6^{5}
(Canada) B Schnur	6	3	0
4	(India) P Gunneswaran	3	6	6
6	(Austria) J Rodionov	6	6
(Japan) T Ito	3	2
(Germany) M Marterer	4	6	3
(Czech Republic) T Macháč	6	3	6

Quarterfinals
7	(Slovakia) M Kližan	3	6	4
4	(India) P Gunneswaran	6	4	6
6	(Austria) J Rodionov	6	6
(Czech Republic) T Macháč	2	3

Semifinals
4	(India) P Gunneswaran	2	6	3
6	(Austria) J Rodionov	6	3	6
