= 2023 BeeTV Women's 60 – Singles =

Singles
- 2023 BeeTV Women's 60

Final
- Champion: (South Korea) Jang Su-jeong
- Runner-up: (Japan) Moyuka Uchijima
- Score: 6–1, 6–4

Events
Singles	Doubles
← 2022 ·	BeeTV Women's	· 2024 →

Anzhelika Isaeva was the defending champion but chose not to participate.

Jang Su-jeong won the title, defeating Moyuka Uchijima in the final, 6–1, 6–4.

== Seeds ==
1. (Japan) Moyuka Uchijima (final)
2. (South Korea) Jang Su-jeong (champion)
3. (France) Kristina Mladenovic (first round)
4. (Croatia) Tara Würth (second round)
5. Polina Kudermetova (semifinals)
6. (France) Chloé Paquet (quarterfinals)
7. (South Korea) Han Na-lae (first round)
8. (Uzbekistan) Nigina Abduraimova (second round)

== Draw ==
=== Key ===
- Q = Qualifier
- WC = Wild card
- LL = Lucky loser
- Alt = Alternate
- SE = Special exempt
- PR = Protected ranking
- ITF = ITF entry
- JE = Junior exempt
- w/o = Walkover
- r = Retired
- d = Defaulted
- SR = Special ranking

=== Finals ===
Semifinals
1	(Japan) Moyuka Uchijima	6	7
Anastasia Zakharova	4	5
5	Polina Kudermetova	2	7^{7}	3
2	(South Korea) Jang Su-jeong	6	6^{5}	6

Final
1	(Japan) Moyuka Uchijima	1	4
2	(South Korea) Jang Su-jeong	6	6

=== Top half ===
First round
1	(Japan) M Uchijima	3	7	6
(Serbia) N Stevanović	6	5	2
WC	(Kazakhstan) G Ainitdinova	3	6	7^{7}
M Timofeeva	6	1	6^{3}
Q	(Turkey) Z Sönmez	7^{7}	6
(Georgia (country)) E Gorgodze	6^{4}	2
(Germany) N Noha Akugue	3	7^{7}	6
7	(South Korea) N-l Han	6	6^{5}	4
3	(France) K Mladenovic	3	5
Q	E Maklakova	6	7
A Zakharova	6	6
Q	T Prozorova	3	3
E Makarova	5	0^{r}
D Astakhova	7	3
WC	(Kazakhstan) Z Kulambayeva	3	3
6	(France) C Paquet	6	6

Second round
1	(Japan) M Uchijima	6	6
WC	(Kazakhstan) G Ainitdinova	3	1
Q	(Turkey) Z Sönmez	3	6	6
(Germany) N Noha Akugue	6	3	3
Q	E Maklakova	2	6	1
A Zakharova	6	3	6
D Astakhova	1	5
6	(France) C Paquet	6	7

Quarterfinals
1	(Japan) M Uchijima	6	6^{6}	6
Q	(Turkey) Z Sönmez	1	7^{8}	4
A Zakharova	3	6	6
6	(France) C Paquet	6	2	3

Semifinals
1	(Japan) M Uchijima	6	7
A Zakharova	4	5

=== Bottom half ===
First round
5	P Kudermetova	6	6
WC	(Germany) S Zhiyenbayeva	1	2
Q	(Japan) M Kobori	5	1
A Tikhonova	7	6
I Shymanovich	6	6
Q	(Germany) E Seidel	0	3
Q	E Yashina	6	0	3
4	(Croatia) T Würth	3	6	6
8	(Uzbekistan) N Abduraimova	6	2	6
(North Macedonia) L Gjorcheska	2	6	4
Q	(China) X Gao	2	6	4
(Croatia) T Lukas	6	3	6
Q	(United Kingdom) A Brogan	4	2
V Diatchenko	6	6
WC	(Kazakhstan) A Sagandikova	1	2
2	(South Korea) S-j Jang	6	6

Second round
5	P Kudermetova	4	6	6
A Tikhonova	6	1	4
I Shymanovich	4	6	7^{12}
4	(Croatia) T Würth	6	1	6^{10}
8	(Uzbekistan) N Abduraimova	3	5
(Croatia) T Lukas	6	7
V Diatchenko	4	0
2	(South Korea) S-j Jang	6	6

Quarterfinals
5	P Kudermetova	7	6
I Shymanovich	5	3
(Croatia) T Lukas	4	7^{7}	0
2	(South Korea) S-j Jang	6	6^{5}	6

Semifinals
5	P Kudermetova	2	7^{7}	3
2	(South Korea) S-j Jang	6	6^{5}	6
