= 2022 Wimbledon Championships – Men's doubles =

Men's doubles
- 2022 Wimbledon Championships

Final
- Champions: (Australia) Matthew Ebden (Australia) Max Purcell
- Runners-up: (Croatia) Nikola Mektić (Croatia) Mate Pavić
- Score: 7–6^{(7–5)}, 6–7^{(3–7)}, 4–6, 6–4, 7–6^{(10–2)}

Events
Singles	men	women		boys	girls
Doubles	men	women	mixed	boys	girls
WC Singles	men	women	quad
WC Doubles	men	women	quad
14&U Singles	boys	girls
Legends	men	women	mixed
- Wimbledon Championships

Matthew Ebden and Max Purcell defeated the defending champions Nikola Mektić and Mate Pavić in the final, 7–6^{(7–5)}, 6–7^{(3–7)}, 4–6, 6–4, 7–6^{(10–2)} to win the gentlemen's doubles tennis title at the 2022 Wimbledon Championships. It was their first major title as a team, and their second title of the season. They saved a total of eight match points en route to the title (three in their first-round match against Ben McLachlan and André Göransson, and five in their semifinal match against Rajeev Ram and Joe Salisbury), and twice recovered from two sets down, having been taken to five sets in five of the six matches they played.

This was the first edition of Wimbledon to feature a champions (Note: also referred to as super tie-break) tiebreak (10-point tie-break) when the score reaches six games all in the fifth set, and the third edition to feature a final-set tiebreak. (Note: The previous tie-break rule was a 7-point tie-break, when the score reached twelve games all in the fifth set.) Hans Hach Verdugo, Philipp Oswald, Roman Jebavý and Hunter Reese were the first players to contest this tiebreak in the gentlemen's doubles event, with the team of Hach Verdugo and Oswald saving a match point and winning the tiebreak 11–9 in their first-round match.

This marked the last time that Men's Doubles were played in the best-of-five sets as Wimbledon reduced men's doubles matches to best-of-three starting with the 2023 tournament.

== Seeds ==
1. (United States) Rajeev Ram / (United Kingdom) Joe Salisbury (semifinals)
2. (Croatia) Nikola Mektić / (Croatia) Mate Pavić (final)
3. (Netherlands) Wesley Koolhof / (United Kingdom) Neal Skupski (third round)
4. (El Salvador) Marcelo Arévalo / (Netherlands) Jean-Julien Rojer (first round)
5. (Germany) Tim Pütz / (New Zealand) Michael Venus (first round)
6. (Colombia) Juan Sebastián Cabal / (Colombia) Robert Farah (semifinals)
7. (Australia) John Peers / (Slovakia) Filip Polášek (quarterfinals)
8. (Croatia) Ivan Dodig / (United States) Austin Krajicek (third round, withdrew)

9. (United Kingdom) Jamie Murray / (Brazil) Bruno Soares (third round)
10. (Australia) Thanasi Kokkinakis / (Australia) Nick Kyrgios (withdrew)
11. (Germany) Kevin Krawietz / (Germany) Andreas Mies (quarterfinals)
12. (France) Nicolas Mahut / (France) Édouard Roger-Vasselin (quarterfinals)
13. (Mexico) Santiago González / (Argentina) Andrés Molteni (third round)
14. (Australia) Matthew Ebden / (Australia) Max Purcell (champions)
15. (United Kingdom) Lloyd Glasspool / (Finland) Harri Heliövaara (third round)
16. (Brazil) Rafael Matos / (Spain) David Vega Hernández (third round)

Click on the seed number of a player to go to their draw section.

== Draw ==
Key

- Q = Qualifier
- WC = Wild card
- LL = Lucky loser
- Alt = Alternate
- ITF = ITF entry
- PR = Protected ranking
- SR = Special ranking
- SE = Special exempt
- JE = Junior exempt
- JR = Junior Accelerator Programme entrant
- CO = College Accelerator Programme entrant
- NG = Next Gen Accelerator Program entrant
- w/o = Walkover
- r = Retired
- d = Defaulted

=== Finals ===
Quarterfinals
1	(United States) Rajeev Ram (United Kingdom) Joe Salisbury	6	6^{1}	6	3	6
12	(France) Nicolas Mahut (France) Édouard Roger-Vasselin	3	7^{7}	1	6	4
14	(Australia) Matthew Ebden (Australia) Max Purcell	6	6	6
7	(Australia) John Peers (Slovakia) Filip Polášek	4	4	2
6	(Colombia) Juan Sebastián Cabal (Colombia) Robert Farah	6	6	6^{3}	1
(United States) Denis Kudla (United States) Jack Sock	3	3	7^{7}	1^{r}
11	(Germany) Kevin Krawietz (Germany) Andreas Mies	4	3	3
2	(Croatia) Nikola Mektić (Croatia) Mate Pavić	6	6	6

Semifinals
1	(United States) Rajeev Ram (United Kingdom) Joe Salisbury	6	7^{7}	6^{9}	4	2
14	(Australia) Matthew Ebden (Australia) Max Purcell	3	6^{1}	7^{11}	6	6
6	(Colombia) Juan Sebastián Cabal (Colombia) Robert Farah	7^{7}	6^{0}	6	2	6^{4}
2	(Croatia) Nikola Mektić (Croatia) Mate Pavić	6^{2}	7^{7}	4	6	7^{10}

Final
14	(Australia) Matthew Ebden (Australia) Max Purcell	7^{7}	6^{3}	4	6	7^{10}
2	(Croatia) Nikola Mektić (Croatia) Mate Pavić	6^{5}	7^{7}	6	4	6^{2}

=== Top half ===
==== Section 1 ====
First round
1	(United States) R Ram (United Kingdom) J Salisbury	6	7^{7}	7^{8}
(Germany) D Altmaier (Spain) C Taberner	3	6^{5}	6^{6}
(France) F Martin (Monaco) H Nys	5	6^{9}	6	7^{7}	7
(Argentina) M González (United States) N Lammons	7	7^{11}	4	6^{2}	5
(Kazakhstan) A Nedovyesov (Pakistan) A-u-H Qureshi	6	6^{10}	6	6
(Australia) J Duckworth (United States) M Giron	3	7^{12}	1	2
WC	(United Kingdom) L Broady (United Kingdom) J Clarke	3	7^{8}	4	2
16	(Brazil) R Matos (Spain) D Vega Hernández	6	6^{6}	6	6
12	(France) N Mahut (France) É Roger-Vasselin	6	6	6
(Argentina) F Cerúndolo (Argentina) TM Etcheverry	1	2	3
(Mexico) H Hach Verdugo (Austria) P Oswald	6	6^{6}	4	7^{7}	7^{11}
(Czech Republic) R Jebavý (United States) H Reese	2	7^{8}	6	6^{5}	6^{9}
(United States) M Cressy (Spain) F López	2	5	3
PR	(Poland) Ł Kubot (Poland) S Walków	6	7	6
(United States) S Johnson (United States) S Querrey	3	6^{2}	7^{7}	5
8	(Croatia) I Dodig (United States) A Krajicek	6	7^{7}	6^{4}	7

Second round
1	(United States) R Ram (United Kingdom) J Salisbury	6	6	6
(France) F Martin (Monaco) H Nys	4	4	4
(Kazakhstan) A Nedovyesov (Pakistan) A-u-H Qureshi	6	6^{6}	3^{r}
16	(Brazil) R Matos (Spain) D Vega Hernández	3	7^{8}	5
12	(France) N Mahut (France) É Roger-Vasselin	6^{5}	6^{4}	7^{7}	7^{7}	6
(Mexico) H Hach Verdugo (Austria) P Oswald	7^{7}	7^{7}	6^{3}	6^{2}	4
PR	(Poland) Ł Kubot (Poland) S Walków	6^{6}	3	2
8	(Croatia) I Dodig (United States) A Krajicek	7^{8}	6	6

Third round
1	(United States) R Ram (United Kingdom) J Salisbury	4	6	6	6
16	(Brazil) R Matos (Spain) D Vega Hernández	6	4	3	4
12	(France) N Mahut (France) É Roger-Vasselin	w/o
8	(Croatia) I Dodig (United States) A Krajicek

Quarterfinals
1	(United States) R Ram (United Kingdom) J Salisbury	6	6^{1}	6	3	6
12	(France) N Mahut (France) É Roger-Vasselin	3	7^{7}	1	6	4

==== Section 2 ====
First round
3	(Netherlands) W Koolhof (United Kingdom) N Skupski	6	7	6
(Argentina) F Bagnis (Argentina) D Schwartzman	3	5	3
(Spain) P Martínez (Australia) J-P Smith	6	7^{7}	6
(Kazakhstan) A Golubev (Ukraine) D Molchanov	3	6^{1}	4
WC	(United Kingdom) A Gray (United Kingdom) R Peniston	4	6	4	7^{9}	4
(Belgium) J Vliegen (United States) J Withrow	6	3	6	6^{7}	6
(Sweden) A Göransson (Japan) B McLachlan	7^{7}	6	3	4	6^{8}
14	(Australia) M Ebden (Australia) M Purcell	6^{5}	4	6	6	7^{10}
9	(United Kingdom) J Murray (Brazil) B Soares	6	6	6
(France) B Bonzi (France) A Rinderknech	3	4	2
(Argentina) S Báez (Argentina) F Delbonis	2	6^{6}	6^{6}
(Serbia) N Ćaćić (Italy) A Vavassori	6	7^{8}	7^{8}
(Portugal) J Sousa (Australia) J Thompson	2	4	7^{7}	6	6
(Netherlands) M Middelkoop (Australia) L Saville	6	6	6^{4}	3	3
(United States) M McDonald (Netherlands) B van de Zandschulp	6	6	5	3	2
7	(Australia) J Peers (Slovakia) F Polášek	4	4	7	6	6

Second round
3	(Netherlands) W Koolhof (United Kingdom) N Skupski	7^{8}	6	7^{7}
(Spain) P Martínez (Australia) J-P Smith	6^{6}	2	6^{4}
(Belgium) J Vliegen (United States) J Withrow	4	7^{7}	6	6^{3}	4
14	(Australia) M Ebden (Australia) M Purcell	6	6^{2}	4	7^{7}	6
9	(United Kingdom) J Murray (Brazil) B Soares	6	7^{7}	7
(Serbia) N Ćaćić (Italy) A Vavassori	4	6^{4}	5
(Portugal) J Sousa (Australia) J Thompson	6^{2}	5	4
7	(Australia) J Peers (Slovakia) F Polášek	7^{7}	7	6

Third round
3	(Netherlands) W Koolhof (United Kingdom) N Skupski	5	4	6	6	5
14	(Australia) M Ebden (Australia) M Purcell	7	6	3	4	7
9	(United Kingdom) J Murray (Brazil) B Soares	6^{5}	4	6	4
7	(Australia) J Peers (Slovakia) F Polášek	7^{7}	6	4	6

Quarterfinals
14	(Australia) M Ebden (Australia) M Purcell	6	6	6
7	(Australia) J Peers (Slovakia) F Polášek	4	4	2

=== Bottom half ===
==== Section 3 ====
First round
6	(Colombia) JS Cabal (Colombia) R Farah	6	6	6
(France) U Humbert (France) A Mannarino	4	4	4
PR	(Philippines) T Huey (Croatia) F Škugor	6^{11}	6	7	3	2
(Portugal) N Borges (Portugal) F Cabral	7^{13}	3	5	6	6
(Moldova) R Albot (Georgia (country)) N Basilashvili	7	7^{7}	5	1	6
Alt	(Netherlands) S Arends (France) Q Halys	5	6^{4}	7	6	4
PR	(Slovenia) A Bedene (South Korea) S-w Kwon	6^{5}	6^{4}	3
Alt	(Ecuador) D Hidalgo (Colombia) C Rodríguez	7^{7}	7^{7}	6
13	(Mexico) S González (Argentina) A Molteni	7^{7}	6	6
WC	(United Kingdom) J Cash (United Kingdom) H Patten	6^{5}	4	4
Alt	(United States) R Galloway (United States) M Schnur	6	6	6
(Netherlands) T Griekspoor (Germany) O Otte	1	4	2
(Poland) K Majchrzak (Poland) J Zieliński	5	5	7	6	6
(Serbia) L Djere (Serbia) D Lajović	7	7	5	3	4
(United States) D Kudla (United States) J Sock	7^{7}	6	6
4	(El Salvador) M Arévalo (Netherlands) J-J Rojer	6^{4}	3	4

Second round
6	(Colombia) JS Cabal (Colombia) R Farah	7	6	6
(Portugal) N Borges (Portugal) F Cabral	5	4	2
(Moldova) R Albot (Georgia (country)) N Basilashvili	6	2	3	7^{7}	7
Alt	(Ecuador) D Hidalgo (Colombia) C Rodríguez	4	6	6	6^{2}	5
13	(Mexico) S González (Argentina) A Molteni	7^{8}	6	3	6^{4}	6
Alt	(United States) R Galloway (United States) M Schnur	6^{6}	4	6	7^{7}	4
(Poland) K Majchrzak (Poland) J Zieliński	6	1^{r}
(United States) D Kudla (United States) J Sock	4	3

Third round
6	(Colombia) JS Cabal (Colombia) R Farah	6	6	6
(Moldova) R Albot (Georgia (country)) N Basilashvili	1	4	4
13	(Mexico) S González (Argentina) A Molteni	4	2	4
(United States) D Kudla (United States) J Sock	6	6	6

Quarterfinals
6	(Colombia) JS Cabal (Colombia) R Farah	6	6	6^{3}	1
(United States) D Kudla (United States) J Sock	3	3	7^{7}	1^{r}

==== Section 4 ====
First round
5	(Germany) T Pütz (New Zealand) M Venus	6	6^{2}	5	6	6^{6}
(South Africa) R Klaasen (Brazil) M Melo	4	7^{7}	7	1	7^{10}
PR	(Chile) J Peralta (Chile) A Tabilo	2	3	4
WC	(United Kingdom) J O'Mara (United Kingdom) K Skupski	6	6	6
(Uruguay) A Behar (Ecuador) G Escobar	5	6^{8}	6^{3}
WC	(United Kingdom) A Fery (United Kingdom) F Gill	7	7^{10}	7^{7}
(France) S Doumbia (France) F Reboul	7	4	6^{3}	1
11	(Germany) K Krawietz (Germany) A Mies	5	6	7^{7}	6
15	(United Kingdom) L Glasspool (Finland) H Heliövaara	6	6	6
(France) H Gaston (Italy) L Musetti	3	3	4
(United States) W Blumberg (Norway) C Ruud	4	6	7^{7}	2	7^{10}
(Colombia) N Barrientos (Mexico) MÁ Reyes-Varela	6	3	6^{5}	6	6^{7}
(Bosnia and Herzegovina) T Brkić (India) R Ramanathan	3	6^{5}	6^{5}
Alt	(United States) N Monroe (United States) T Paul	6	7^{7}	7^{7}
(France) B Paire (Spain) A Ramos Viñolas	4	1	1
2	(Croatia) N Mektić (Croatia) M Pavić	6	6	6

Second round
(South Africa) R Klaasen (Brazil) M Melo	2	4	4
WC	(United Kingdom) J O'Mara (United Kingdom) K Skupski	6	6	6
WC	(United Kingdom) A Fery (United Kingdom) F Gill	6^{5}	3	4
11	(Germany) K Krawietz (Germany) A Mies	7^{7}	6	6
15	(United Kingdom) L Glasspool (Finland) H Heliövaara	6	3	6	3	6
(United States) W Blumberg (Norway) C Ruud	1	6	3	6	4
Alt	(United States) N Monroe (United States) T Paul	2	6	3	2
2	(Croatia) N Mektić (Croatia) M Pavić	6	3	6	6

Third round
WC	(United Kingdom) J O'Mara (United Kingdom) K Skupski	6^{6}	4	4
11	(Germany) K Krawietz (Germany) A Mies	7^{8}	6	6
15	(United Kingdom) L Glasspool (Finland) H Heliövaara	4	6^{6}	6	6	3
2	(Croatia) N Mektić (Croatia) M Pavić	6	7^{8}	4	2	6

Quarterfinals
11	(Germany) K Krawietz (Germany) A Mies	4	3	3
2	(Croatia) N Mektić (Croatia) M Pavić	6	6	6

== Other entry information ==
=== Wild cards ===
- (United Kingdom) Liam Broady / (United Kingdom) Jay Clarke
- (United Kingdom) Julian Cash / (United Kingdom) Henry Patten
- (United Kingdom) Arthur Fery / (United Kingdom) Felix Gill
- (United Kingdom) Alastair Gray / (United Kingdom) Ryan Peniston
- (United Kingdom) Jonny O'Mara / (United Kingdom) Ken Skupski

=== Protected ranking ===
- (Slovenia) Aljaž Bedene / (South Korea) Kwon Soon-woo
- (Philippines) Treat Huey / (Croatia) Franko Škugor
- (Poland) Łukasz Kubot / (Poland) Szymon Walków
- (Chile) Julio Peralta / (Chile) Alejandro Tabilo

=== Alternates ===
- (Netherlands) Sander Arends / (France) Quentin Halys
- (United States) Robert Galloway / (United States) Max Schnur
- (Ecuador) Diego Hidalgo / (Colombia) Cristian Rodríguez
- (United States) Nicholas Monroe / (United States) Tommy Paul

=== Withdrawals ===
Before the tournament

- (Kazakhstan) Alexander Bublik / (Czech Republic) Jiří Veselý → replaced by (Netherlands) Sander Arends / (France) Quentin Halys
- (Spain) Roberto Carballés Baena / (Spain) Pablo Carreño Busta → replaced by (United States) Nicholas Monroe / (United States) Tommy Paul
- (Argentina) Federico Coria / (Bolivia) Hugo Dellien → replaced by (United States) Robert Galloway / (United States) Max Schnur
- (Spain) Marcel Granollers / (Argentina) Horacio Zeballos → replaced by (Germany) Daniel Altmaier / (Spain) Carlos Taberner
- (Australia) Thanasi Kokkinakis / (Australia) Nick Kyrgios → replaced by (Ecuador) Diego Hidalgo / (Colombia) Cristian Rodríguez

== Explanatory Notes ==
Preceded by 2022 French Open – Men's doubles	Grand Slam men's doubles	Succeeded by 2022 US Open – Men's doubles
