= 2019 Nur-Sultan Challenger =

- Date: 30 September – 6 October
- Edition: 1st
- Draw: 48S / 4Q / 16D
- Surface: Hard (indoor)
- Location: Nur-Sultan, Kazakhstan

Champions

Singles
- (Ukraine) Illya Marchenko

Doubles
- (Finland) Harri Heliövaara / (Ukraine) Illya Marchenko
| Nur-Sultan Challenger | · 2020 → |

The 2019 Nur-Sultan Challenger was a professional tennis tournament played on indoor hard courts. It was the first edition of the tournament which was part of the 2019 ATP Challenger Tour. It took place in Nur-Sultan, Kazakhstan between 30 September and 6 October 2019.

== Singles main-draw entrants ==
=== Seeds ===
| Country | Player | Rank^{1} | Seed |
|---|---|---|---|
| FRA | Corentin Moutet | 96 | 1 |
| RUS | Evgeny Donskoy | 116 | 2 |
| TUN | Malek Jaziri | 117 | 3 |
| BLR | Ilya Ivashka | 134 | 4 |
| GER | Yannick Maden | 136 | 5 |
| SRB | Viktor Troicki | 151 | 6 |
| UZB | Denis Istomin | 165 | 7 |
| RUS | Alexey Vatutin | 195 | 8 |
| BEL | Ruben Bemelmans | 202 | 9 |
| KAZ | Dmitry Popko | 209 | 10 |
| ITA | Matteo Viola | 213 | 11 |
| KAZ | Aleksandr Nedovyesov | 216 | 12 |
| RUS | Roman Safiullin | 229 | 13 |
| IND | Sasikumar Mukund | 233 | 14 |
| JPN | Hiroki Moriya | 250 | 15 |
| RUS | Evgeny Karlovskiy | 256 | 16 |

- ^{1} Rankings are as of 23 September 2019.

=== Other entrants ===
The following players received wildcards into the singles main draw:

- (Russia) Andrei Iakovlev
- (Uzbekistan) Jurabek Karimov
- (Kazakhstan) Timur Khabibulin
- (Kazakhstan) Dostanbek Tashbulatov
- (Kazakhstan) Beibit Zhukayev

The following player received entry into the singles main draw using a protected ranking:

- (Austria) Maximilian Neuchrist

The following players received entry from the qualifying draw:

- (Russia) Savriyan Danilov
- (France) Fabien Reboul

The following player received entry as a lucky loser:

- (Kazakhstan) Sagadat Ayap

== Champions ==
=== Singles ===
- (Ukraine) Illya Marchenko def. (Germany) Yannick Maden 4–6, 6–4, 6–3.

=== Doubles ===
- (Finland) Harri Heliövaara / (Ukraine) Illya Marchenko def. (Poland) Karol Drzewiecki / (Poland) Szymon Walków 6–4, 6–4.
