= 2023 BeeTV Women's 60 – Doubles =

Doubles
- 2023 BeeTV Women's 60

Final
- Champions: Polina Kudermetova; Anastasia Tikhonova
- Runners-up: (South Korea) Han Na-lae (South Korea) Jang Su-jeong
- Score: 2–6, 6–3, [10–7]

Events
Singles	Doubles
- BeeTV Women's

Ekaterina Makarova and Linda Nosková were the defending champions but Nosková chose not to participate. Makarova partnered alongside Anastasia Zakharova but lost in the semifinals to Han Na-lae and Jang Su-jeong.

Polina Kudermetova and Anastasia Tikhonova won the title, defeating Han and Jang in the final, 2–6, 6–3, [10–7].

== Seeds ==
1. (South Korea) Han Na-lae / (South Korea) Jang Su-jeong (final)
2. Iryna Shymanovich / Ekaterina Yashina (first round)
3. Ekaterina Makarova / Anastasia Zakharova (semifinals)
4. (Japan) Moyuka Uchijima / (Hong Kong) Cody Wong (quarterfinals)

== Draw ==
Key

- Q = Qualifier
- WC = Wild card
- LL = Lucky loser
- Alt = Alternate
- ITF = ITF entry
- PR = Protected ranking
- SR = Special ranking
- SE = Special exempt
- JE = Junior exempt
- JR = Junior Accelerator Programme entrant
- CO = College Accelerator Programme entrant
- NG = Next Gen Accelerator Program entrant
- w/o = Walkover
- r = Retired
- d = Defaulted

First round
1	(South Korea) N-l Han (South Korea) S-j Jang	6	3	[10]
(Serbia) N Stevanović (Croatia) T Würth	2	6	[8]
(Japan) M Kobori (Japan) K Okamura	4	4
S Lansere; M Timofeeva	6	6
3	E Makarova; A Zakharova	6	6
WC	(Kazakhstan) A Arystanbekova (Kazakhstan) A Nupbay	2	3
(France) K Mladenovic (France) C Paquet	6	6
(Japan) E Hayashi (Thailand) L Kumkhum	1	4
(Uzbekistan) N Abduraimova (Georgia (country)) E Gorgodze	1	6	[9]
P Kudermetova; A Tikhonova	6	0	[11]
WC	(Kazakhstan) G Ainitdinova; T Prozorova	2	6^{2}
4	(Japan) M Uchijima (Hong Kong) C Wong	6	7^{7}
(Indonesia) B Gumulya (Indonesia) J Rompies	2	4
(Netherlands) J Gimbrère (Netherlands) B Schoofs	6	6
WC	(Poland) M Kubka (Kazakhstan) Z Kulambayeva	7	6
2	I Shymanovich; E Yashina	5	3

Quarterfinals
1	(South Korea) N-l Han (South Korea) S-j Jang	5	7	[10]
S Lansere; M Timofeeva	7	5	[4]
3	E Makarova; A Zakharova	w/o
(France) K Mladenovic (France) C Paquet
P Kudermetova; A Tikhonova	2
4	(Japan) M Uchijima (Hong Kong) C Wong	4^{r}
(Netherlands) J Gimbrère (Netherlands) B Schoofs	4	4
WC	(Poland) M Kubka (Kazakhstan) Z Kulambayeva	6	6

Semifinals
1	(South Korea) N-l Han (South Korea) S-j Jang	6	6
3	E Makarova; A Zakharova	2	4
P Kudermetova; A Tikhonova	5	7	[10]
WC	(Poland) M Kubka (Kazakhstan) Z Kulambayeva	7	5	[3]

Final
1	(South Korea) N-l Han (South Korea) S-j Jang	6	3	[7]
P Kudermetova; A Tikhonova	2	6	[10]
