= 2023 BeeTV Women's 60 =

Tennis tournament

- Date: 6–12 March 2023
- Edition: 4th
- Category: ITF Women's World Tennis Tour
- Prize money: $60,000
- Surface: Hard / Indoor
- Location: Astana, Kazakhstan

Champions

Singles
- (South Korea) Jang Su-jeong

Doubles
- Polina Kudermetova / Anastasia Tikhonova
- BeeTV Women's

The 2023 BeeTV Women's 60 was a professional tennis tournament played on indoor hard courts. It was the fourth edition of the tournament, which was part of the 2023 ITF Women's World Tennis Tour. It took place in Astana, Kazakhstan, between 6 and 12 March 2023.

== Champions ==
=== Singles ===
- (South Korea) Jang Su-jeong def. (Japan) Moyuka Uchijima, 6–1, 6–4

=== Doubles ===
- Polina Kudermetova / Anastasia Tikhonova def. (South Korea) Han Na-lae / (South Korea) Jang Su-jeong, 2–6, 6–3, [10–7]

== Singles main draw entrants ==
=== Seeds ===
Country	Player	Rank	Seed
JPN	Moyuka Uchijima	131	1
KOR	Jang Su-jeong	141	2
FRA	Kristina Mladenovic	144	3
CRO	Tara Würth	165	4
	Polina Kudermetova	167	5
FRA	Chloé Paquet	170	6
KOR	Han Na-lae	175	7
UZB	Nigina Abduraimova	177	8

- Rankings are as of 27 February 2023.

=== Other entrants ===
The following players received wildcards into the singles main draw:

- (Kazakhstan) Gozal Ainitdinova
- (Kazakhstan) Zhibek Kulambayeva
- (Kazakhstan) Aruzhan Sagandikova
- (Germany) Sonja Zhiyenbayeva

The following players received entry from the qualifying draw:

- (United Kingdom) Anna Brogan
- (China) Gao Xinyu
- (Japan) Momoko Kobori
- Ekaterina Maklakova
- Tatiana Prozorova
- (Germany) Ella Seidel
- (Turkey) Zeynep Sönmez
- Ekaterina Yashina
