= 2019 Nur-Sultan Challenger – Doubles =

Doubles
- 2019 Nur-Sultan Challenger

Final
- Champions: (Finland) Harri Heliövaara (Ukraine) Illya Marchenko
- Runners-up: (Poland) Karol Drzewiecki (Poland) Szymon Walków
- Score: 6–4, 6–4

Events
Singles	Doubles
- Nur-Sultan Challenger

This was the first edition of the tournament.

Harri Heliövaara and Illya Marchenko won the title after defeating Karol Drzewiecki and Szymon Walków 6–4, 6–4 in the final.

== Seeds ==
1. (Ukraine) Denys Molchanov / (Belarus) Andrei Vasilevski (first round)
2. (Switzerland) Marc-Andrea Hüsler / (Germany) Mischa Zverev (first round)
3. (France) Sadio Doumbia / (France) Fabien Reboul (first round)
4. (Poland) Karol Drzewiecki / (Poland) Szymon Walków (final)

== Draw ==
Key

- Q = Qualifier
- WC = Wild card
- LL = Lucky loser
- Alt = Alternate
- ITF = ITF entry
- PR = Protected ranking
- SR = Special ranking
- SE = Special exempt
- JE = Junior exempt
- JR = Junior Accelerator Programme entrant
- CO = College Accelerator Programme entrant
- NG = Next Gen Accelerator Program entrant
- w/o = Walkover
- r = Retired
- d = Defaulted

First round
1	(Ukraine) D Molchanov (Belarus) A Vasilevski	5	3
(Belgium) R Bemelmans (Czech Republic) Z Kolář	7	6
WC	(Kazakhstan) Sagadat Ayap (Kazakhstan) D Popko	2	2
WC	(Serbia) V Troicki (Serbia) N Zimonjić	6	6
3	(France) S Doumbia (France) F Reboul	6	6^{3}	[13]
(Finland) H Heliövaara (Ukraine) I Marchenko	4	7^{7}	[15]
(France) M Guinard (Russia) A Vatutin	1	6^{5}
WC	(Russia) M Elgin (Uzbekistan) D Istomin	6	7^{7}
(Kazakhstan) T Khabibulin (Ukraine) V Manafov	6	6^{4}	[5]
4	(Poland) K Drzewiecki (Poland) S Walków	4	7^{7}	[10]
(Russia) T Gabashvili (Russia) A Karatsev	5	6	[10]
2	(Switzerland) M-A Hüsler (Germany) M Zverev	7	3	[5]

Quarterfinals
(Belgium) R Bemelmans (Czech Republic) Z Kolář	6	7^{7}
WC	(Serbia) V Troicki (Serbia) N Zimonjić	1	6^{3}
(Finland) H Heliövaara (Ukraine) I Marchenko	w/o
WC	(Russia) M Elgin (Uzbekistan) D Istomin
(Norway) V Durasovic (Russia) I Gakhov	4	4
4	(Poland) K Drzewiecki (Poland) S Walków	6	6
(Russia) K Kravchuk (Kazakhstan) A Nedovyesov	3	7^{11}	[6]
(Russia) T Gabashvili (Russia) A Karatsev	6	6^{9}	[10]

Semifinals
(Belgium) R Bemelmans (Czech Republic) Z Kolář	3	6	[7]
(Finland) H Heliövaara (Ukraine) I Marchenko	6	4	[10]
4	(Poland) K Drzewiecki (Poland) S Walków	w/o
(Russia) T Gabashvili (Russia) A Karatsev

Final
(Finland) H Heliövaara (Ukraine) I Marchenko	6	6
4	(Poland) K Drzewiecki (Poland) S Walków	4	4
