= 2020 Nur-Sultan Challenger =

- Date: 9–15 March
- Edition: 2nd
- Draw: 48S / 4Q / 16D
- Surface: Hard (indoor)
- Location: Nur-Sultan, Kazakhstan

Champions

Singles
- no champion

Doubles
- no champions
← 2019 ·	Nur-Sultan Challenger	· 2021 →

The 2020 Nur-Sultan Challenger was a professional tennis tournament played on indoor hard courts. It was the second edition of the tournament which was part of the 2020 ATP Challenger Tour. It took place in Nur-Sultan, Kazakhstan between 9 and 15 March 2020. The completion of the tournament was canceled due to the coronavirus pandemic.

== Singles main-draw entrants ==
=== Seeds ===
Country	Player	Rank^{1}	Seed
EGY	Mohamed Safwat	131	1
~~GER~~	~~Yannick Maden~~	~~149~~	~~2~~
BEL	Kimmer Coppejans	154	3
AUT	Jurij Rodionov	168	4
NED	Robin Haase	169	5
DEN	Mikael Torpegaard	170	6
KAZ	Dmitry Popko	175	7
NED	Botic van de Zandschulp	177	8
~~FRA~~	~~Enzo Couacaud~~	~~178~~	~~9~~
IND	Ramkumar Ramanathan	182	10
RUS	Roman Safiullin	188	11
POR	Frederico Ferreira Silva	190	12
NED	Tallon Griekspoor	196	13
SWE	Elias Ymer	202	14
UKR	Illya Marchenko	207	15
ESP	Bernabé Zapata Miralles	216	16

- ^{1} Rankings are as of 2 March 2020.

=== Other entrants ===
The following players received wildcards into the singles main draw:

- (Kazakhstan) Timur Khabibulin
- (Kazakhstan) Timur Maulenov
- (Kazakhstan) Danil Ozernoy
- (Kazakhstan) Dostanbek Tashbulatov
- (Kazakhstan) Bekzat Usipbekov

The following players received entry into the singles main draw as alternates:

- (Belarus) Aliaksandr Bulitski
- (Russia) Mikhail Elgin
- (Sweden) Simon Freund
- (Kazakhstan) Rostislav Galfinger
- (Ukraine) Anatoliy Petrenko
- (Poland) Szymon Walków
- (Serbia) Nenad Zimonjić

== Champions ==
=== Singles ===
- tournament canceled

=== Doubles ===
- tournament canceled
