= 2021 Nur-Sultan Challenger II =

- Date: 1–8 March
- Edition: 4th
- Surface: Hard (indoor)
- Location: Nur-Sultan, Kazakhstan

Champions

Singles
- (Czech Republic) Tomáš Macháč

Doubles
- (United States) Nathaniel Lammons / (United States) Jackson Withrow
← 2021 ·	Nur-Sultan Challenger	· 2022 →

The 2021 Nur-Sultan Challenger II was a professional tennis tournament played on indoor hard courts. It was the fourth edition of the tournament which was part of the 2021 ATP Challenger Tour. It took place in Nur-Sultan, Kazakhstan between 1 and 7 March 2021.

== Singles main-draw entrants ==
=== Seeds ===
Country	Player	Rank^{1}	Seed
KOR	Kwon Soon-woo	81	1
FIN	Emil Ruusuvuori	85	2
KAZ	Mikhail Kukushkin	94	3
AUS	James Duckworth	100	4
JPN	Taro Daniel	120	5
RUS	Evgeny Donskoy	123	6
SUI	Henri Laaksonen	134	7
IND	Prajnesh Gunneswaran	138	8

- ^{1} Rankings are as of 22 February 2021.

=== Other entrants ===
The following players received wildcards into the singles main draw:

- (Kazakhstan) Aleksandr Nedovyesov
- (Kazakhstan) Timofey Skatov
- (Kazakhstan) Denis Yevseyev

The following players received entry from the qualifying draw:

- (Russia) Alibek Kachmazov
- (Ukraine) Vladyslav Manafov
- (United Kingdom) Ryan Peniston
- (Chinese Taipei) Wu Tung-lin

The following players received entry as lucky losers:

- (United States) Ulises Blanch
- (Germany) Julian Lenz

== Champions ==
=== Singles ===
- (Czech Republic) Tomáš Macháč def. (Austria) Sebastian Ofner 4–6, 6–4, 6–4.

=== Doubles ===
- (United States) Nathaniel Lammons / (United States) Jackson Withrow def. (United States) Nathan Pasha / (United States) Max Schnur 6–4, 6–2.
