= Mackenzie McDonald =

American tennis player (born 1995)

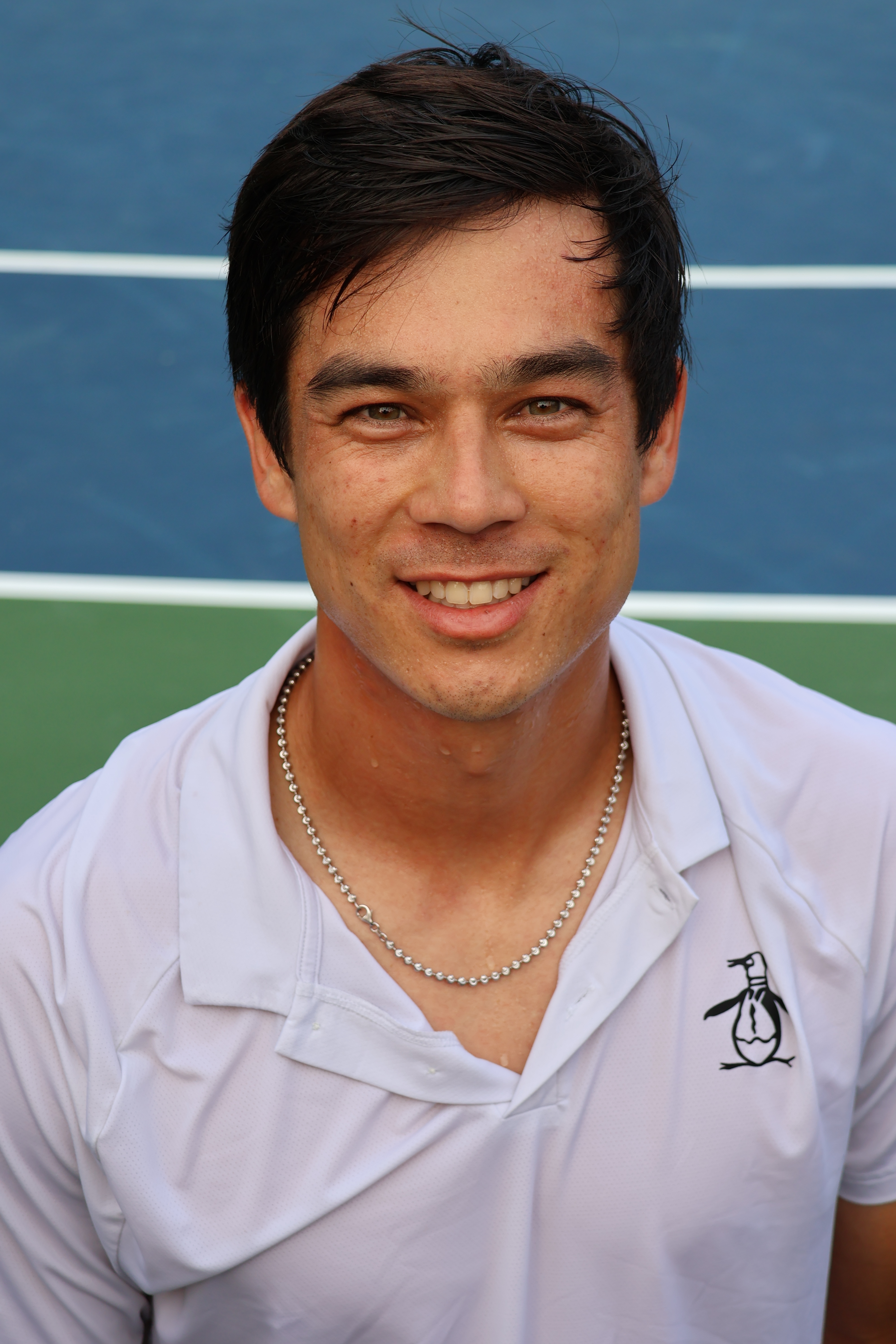
- McDonald at the 2023 Washington Open
- Full name: Michael Mackenzie Lowe McDonald
- Country (sports): United States
- Residence: Orlando, Florida, US
- Born: April 16, 1995 (age 31) Piedmont, California, US
- Height: 5 ft 10 in (1.78 m)
- Turned pro: 2016
- Plays: Right handed (two-handed backhand)
- College: UCLA
- Coach: Calin Mateas
- Prize money: US $7,326,110

Singles
- Career record: 117–148
- Career titles: 0
- Highest ranking: No. 37 (October 16, 2023)
- Current ranking: No. 146 (August 31, 2026)

Grand Slam singles results
- Australian Open: 4R (2021)
- French Open: 3R (2022)
- Wimbledon: 4R (2018)
- US Open: 2R (2021, 2023)

Doubles
- Career record: 57–71
- Career titles: 1
- Highest ranking: No. 49 (October 2, 2023)
- Current ranking: No. 298 (August 31, 2026)

Grand Slam doubles results
- Australian Open: 2R (2021)
- French Open: 3R (2022)
- Wimbledon: 2R (2024)
- US Open: QF (2020)

Grand Slam mixed doubles results
- US Open: 2R (2024)

Team competitions
- Davis Cup: QF (2024)
- Last updated on: August 31, 2026.

Michael Mackenzie Lowe McDonald (born April 16, 1995) is an American professional tennis player. He has a career-high ATP singles ranking of world No. 37 achieved on October 16, 2023 and a doubles ranking of No. 49, reached on October 2, 2023.

McDonald won the 2016 NCAA Division I Tennis Championships in both singles and doubles.

== Junior tennis ==
McDonald was a semifinalist in the boys' singles of the 2012 Australian Open. In 2012, he reached a career high ranking in the ITF World Tour Junior Rankings of number 12 and won the 18s singles title at the 2012 Easter Bowl. While still a junior, he won the men's singles title at the amateur Ojai Tennis Tournament in 2013, and also qualified for the 2013 Cincinnati Masters at age 18 by defeating top 100 players Nicolas Mahut and Steve Johnson. However, he lost in the first round of the main draw to fellow qualifier David Goffin.

== College ==
=== 2014 ===
McDonald was listed as the No. 1 player coming into college according to the ITA. As a freshman at UCLA, he was named a Singles All-American and the Pac-12 Freshman of the Year. McDonald was also a quarterfinalist at the NCAA singles championship while compiling a 33–9 record during the season, including an 18–4 record in dual matches.

=== 2015–16 ===
At the 2015 NCAA Division I Men's Tennis Championship, McDonald defeated top-ranked Axel Alvarez of Oklahoma during team competition. He played #1 singles and doubles for the UCLA Bruins for most of the season.

During the 2016 season, McDonald helped his Bruins to the quarterfinals of the Division I Tennis Team Championship. Then on Memorial Day, May 30, McDonald defeated the No. 1 ranked Mikael Torpegaard of Ohio State University for the singles championship at the Michael D. Case Tennis Center, in Tulsa, Oklahoma. He became the 12th UCLA Bruins player to win the singles title. McDonald also teamed with Martin Redlicki to play for the doubles championship. They defeated the team of Arthur Rinderknech and Jackson Withrow from Texas A&M to win the doubles individual championship. In doing so, McDonald became the first college player to win both the national singles and doubles titles since Matías Boeker of the University of Georgia in 2001. After the NCAA tournament, on June 16, 2016, he announced that he would not return to UCLA for his senior year, but turn professional.

== Professional career ==
=== 2013–15: ATP main draw debut ===
At age 18, McDonald qualified for the 2013 Western & Southern Open by defeating two top 100 players despite never previously having earned an ATP point. He became the first unranked teenager to qualify for an ATP World Tour Masters 1000 tournament since Sergio Casal at the 1995 Miami Masters. McDonald lost in the first round to David Goffin in straight sets. He was subsequently given a wildcard entry into the 2013 US Open qualifying.

McDonald qualified into the main draw of the 2014 Challenger in Winnetka, Illinois and defeated world no. 154 Sam Groth.

=== 2016: Turned Pro, Grand Slam debut at the US Open ===
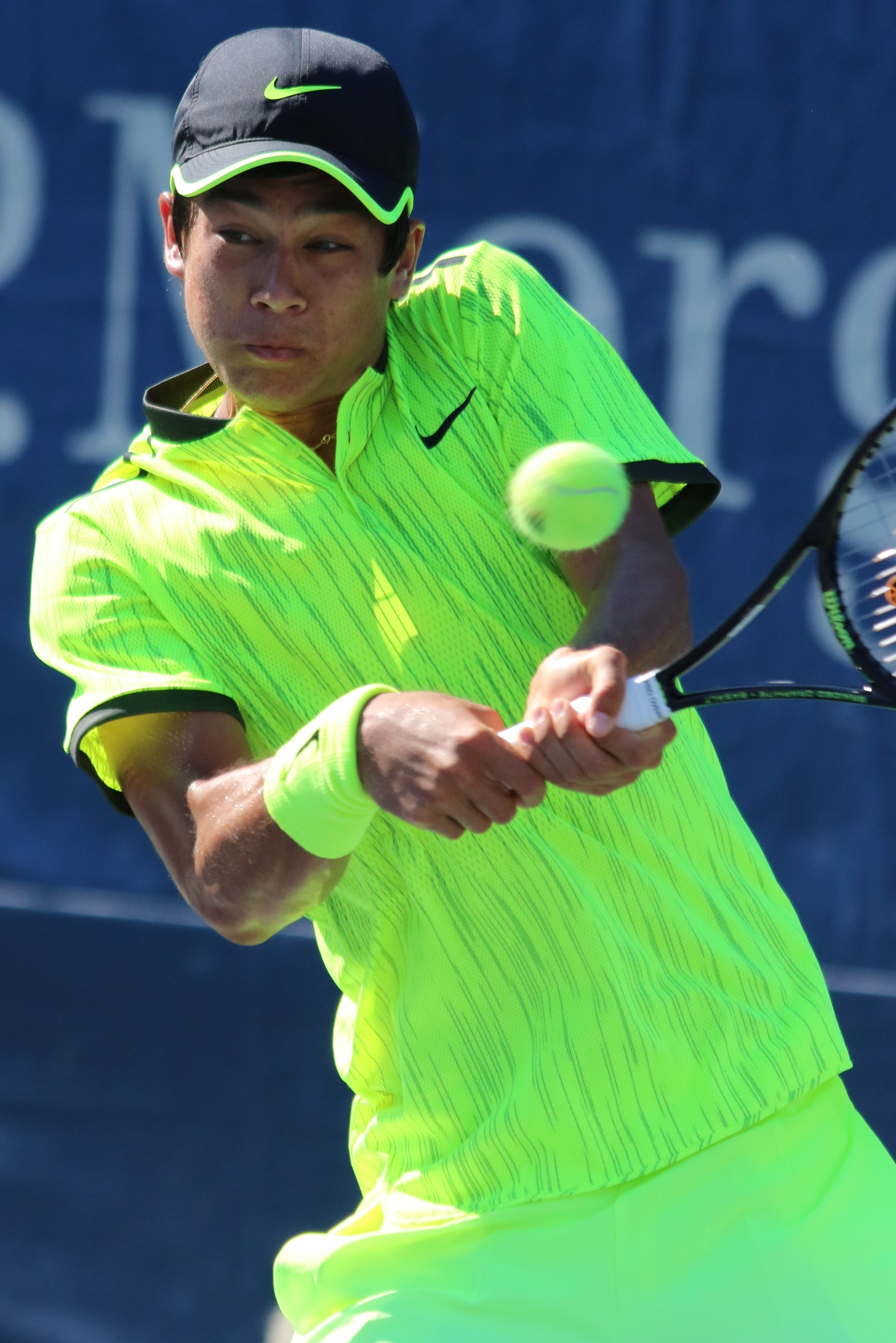
McDonald at the 2016 US Open

McDonald was awarded a wildcard into the main draw of the US Open, where he lost to Czech qualifier Jan Šátral in five sets in the first round. Beginning in late September and lasting through early October, McDonald had an impressive string of results in Challenger-level tournaments, winning his first ITF Pro Circuit title at USA F29 Irvine Futures, as well as reaching back-to-back semifinals in Tiburon and Stockton with impressive wins over three top-150 players.

=== 2017: Oracle US Tennis Award ===
McDonald began the season winning the singles title at the F1 Los Angeles Pro Futures held at the University of Southern California, beating Carl Söderlund in the final by winning the last eleven games. In March at the BNP Paribas Open at Indian Wells, McDonald, along with former University of Virginia tennis player Danielle Collins, were selected to receive the Oracle US Tennis Awards, given to exceptional collegiate players transitioning to a professional. McDonald won the USA F12 Futures doubles event with Lloyd Glasspool, his fifth career Futures doubles title.

=== 2018: Wimbledon fourth round, Top 100 debut ===
McDonald participated in his first Australian Open in January where he defeated Elias Ymer in the first round after winning the qualifiers. In the next round, he was defeated by 3rd ranked Grigor Dimitrov in a 5 set thriller. Later, he won the Seoul Challenger against Jordan Thompson.

At Wimbledon, the American reached his first Grand Slam third-round by winning his first-ever 5-set match over Nicolás Jarry in the round of 64. He then proceeded to defeat Guido Pella in straight sets to reach the second week of a grand slam for the first time in his career. He was then defeated in four sets by Milos Raonic in the round of 16.

=== 2019: First top 10 win, Career-high ranking, Injury and out of Top 100 ===
McDonald reached the final of the 2019 Dallas Challenger in February, where he lost in three sets to Mitchell Krueger, despite leading by a set and a break in the 2nd set. He also participated in the 2019 Delray Beach Open in February, where he achieved his first top 10 win by defeating Juan Martín del Potro in the quarterfinals to reach his first ATP level semifinal, where he lost to Radu Albot. His good form carried on into the ATP 500 Acapulco tournament, where he reached the quarterfinals, eventually losing to Cameron Norrie in two sets. These results helped propel him to a then career-high ranking of world No. 62 on March 4, 2019.

At the 2019 French Open, McDonald suffered a serious hamstring injury in his first round doubles match, forcing him to miss the rest of the 2019 season.

=== 2020: Return to the tour, loss of form during COVID season ===
McDonald returned to the tour in January at the ASB Classic in Auckland. He lost in the final round of qualifying to Mikael Ymer. Using a protected ranking to enter the main draw at the Australian Open, he was defeated in the first round by 30th seed and world No. 32,Dan Evans, despite having a two sets to love lead.

After the early loss in Melbourne, McDonald competed at the Oracle Challenger Series – Newport Beach. Seeded ninth, he lost in the second round to compatriot Raymond Sarmiento. Seeded eighth at the RBC Championships of Dallas, he reached the quarterfinals where he lost to third seed Dominik Koepfer.

At the 2020 US Open, McDonald lost to 30th seed Casper Ruud from two sets up.

At the 2020 French Open, on his debut at this Major, McDonald earned his first victory at a Major since the 2019 Australian Open. Under the supervision of his new coach Jaime Pulgar García, he defeated Canadian qualifier Steven Diez in four sets before losing to defending (and eventual) champion Rafael Nadal in the second round in straight sets.

=== 2021: Australian Open fourth round, First ATP final, return to Top 100 ===
McDonald started his 2021 season at the Delray Beach Open. He lost in the first round to sixth seed, compatriot, and 2016 champion, Sam Querrey. At the Murray River Open, he beat 14th seed, Richard Gasquet, in the first round. He was defeated in the second round by Australian Alex Bolt. Ranked 192 at the Australian Open, he upset 22nd seed and world No. 25, Borna Ćorić, in the second round. He reached the 4th round of a Major for the second time where he was defeated by fourth seed and eventual finalist, Daniil Medvedev.

After the Australian Open, McDonald played at the Nur-Sultan Challenger. He won his 5th Challenger title by beating Jurij Rodionov in the final. At the Nur-Sultan Challenger II, he lost in the second round to eventual champion Tomáš Macháč. At the Open 13 Provence in Marseille, he was ousted from the tournament in the second round by third seed and world No. 21, Karen Khachanov. Getting past qualifying at the Miami Open, he fell in the second round to 18th seed, world No. 28, compatriot, and 2018 champion, John Isner, in three sets. Seeded third at the Orlando Open, he was defeated in the first round by compatriot Christian Harrison.

McDonald started his clay-court season at the BMW Open in Munich, Germany. Getting past qualifying, he knocked out sixth seed Dušan Lajović in the first round. He lost in the second round to fellow qualifier Ilya Ivashka. Seeded third at the Biella Challenger V, he was defeated in the second round by Leonardo Mayer. Seeded eighth at the Heilbronner Neckarcup, he reached the semifinals where he lost to Daniel Elahi Galán. In Geneva, he fell in the final round of qualifying to Ilya Ivashka. Getting past qualifying at the French Open, he lost in the second round to 22nd seed and world No. 23, Cristian Garín, in five sets, despite having two match points in the third-set tie-break.

Seeded fifth at the Nottingham Open, McDonald's first grass-court tournament of the season, he lost in the first round to Evgeny Donskoy. At the Nottingham Trophy, he reached the semifinals where he was defeated by qualifier Alex Bolt, who would end up winning the tournament. Getting past qualifying at Wimbledon, he lost in the first round to 25th seed and world No. 29, Karen Khachanov, who would end up reaching the quarterfinals.

Seeded eighth at the Los Cabos Open, McDonald was eliminated in the first round by qualifier and compatriot, Ernesto Escobedo.

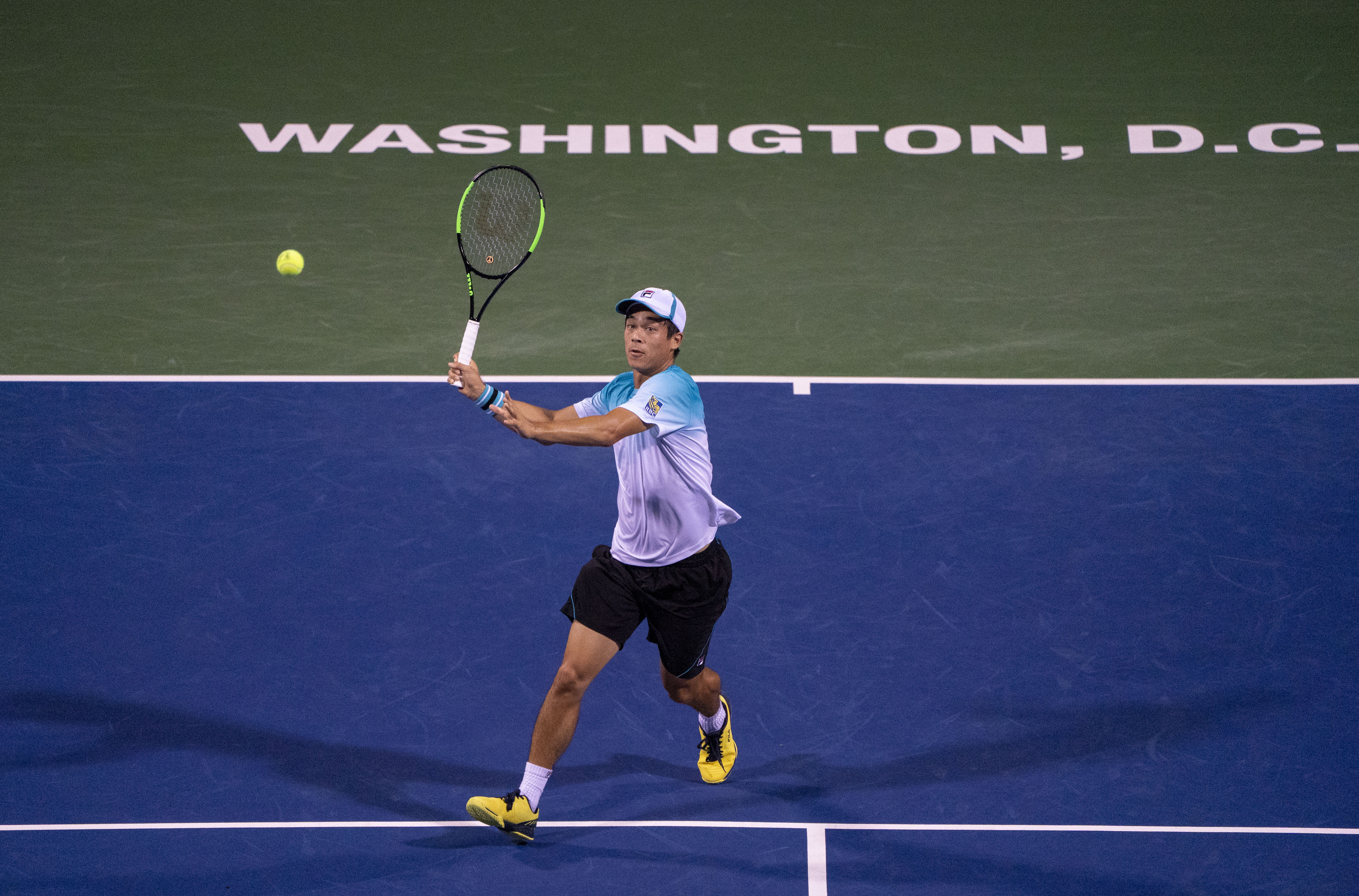
McDonald (pictured in 2018) reached his first ATP final at the 2021 Citi Open

McDonald began his US Open series at the Atlanta Open. He lost in the first round to Emil Ruusuvuori, who would end up reaching the semifinals. Next, he competed at the Citi Open in Washington, D.C. He upset defending champion, Nick Kyrgios, in the first round. He defeated compatriot, Denis Kudla, in the quarterfinals to reach his second Tour-level semifinal and first at the ATP 500 level. In the semifinals, he beat 2015 champion, Kei Nishikori, in three sets to reach his first ATP final. He lost in the final to 5th seed and world No. 24, Jannik Sinner, in three sets. As a result, he returned to the top 100 for the first time in 2 years, climbing more than 40 positions up in the rankings to world No. 64 on August 9, 2021. At the National Bank Open in Toronto, he fell in his first-round match to Benoît Paire. At the Western & Southern Open in Cincinnati, he was defeated in the second round by top seed and world No. 2, Daniil Medvedev. Ranked 61 at the US Open, he upset 27th seed and world No. 30, David Goffin, in the first round. He lost in the second round to 2014 finalist Kei Nishikori.

In October, McDonald played at the Indian Wells Masters. He lost in the second round to top seed and world No. 2, Daniil Medvedev. In Moscow, he was beaten in the second round by Gilles Simon. At the St. Petersburg Open, he lost in the second round to third seed and world No. 20, Roberto Bautista Agut. At the Paris Masters, he was defeated in the first round by Dušan Lajović. McDonald competed in his final tournament of the season at the Stockholm Open. He lost in the first round to Alejandro Davidovich Fokina in three sets.

McDonald ended the year ranked 55.

=== 2022: Top 50 singles debut, Maiden ATP title & top 100 in doubles ===
McDonald started his 2022 season at the first edition of the Melbourne Summer Set 1. Seeded eighth, he lost in the second round to Botic van de Zandschulp. At the Adelaide International 2, he was defeated in the first round by eventual finalist, Arthur Rinderknech, in three sets. At the Australian Open, he lost in the second round to 18th seed, world No. 15, and last year semifinalist, Aslan Karatsev, in four sets.

After the Australian Open, McDonald competed at the Open Sud de France. He was eliminated in the second round by top seed, world No. 3, and eventual finalist, Alexander Zverev. In Rotterdam, he beat eighth seed and world No. 21, Nikoloz Basilashvili, in the first round. He was beaten in the second round by Alex de Minaur in three sets. He made his top 50 debut on February 7, 2022 at world No. 49. At the Qatar ExxonMobil Open, he lost in the first round to sixth seed and world No. 27, Karen Khachanov. At the Dubai Championships, he upset seventh seed and defending champion, Aslan Karatsev, in the first round. He was defeated in the quarterfinals by second seed, world No. 7, and eventual champion, Andrey Rublev. At the Indian Wells Masters, he was ousted from the tournament in the second round by 19th seed and rising star, Carlos Alcaraz. In Miami, he upset 26th seed and world No. 29, Grigor Dimitrov, in the second round. He lost in the third round to second seed and 2018 finalist, Alexander Zverev.

McDonald started his clay-court season at the U.S. Men's Clay Court Championships in Houston. He lost in the first round to Nick Kyrgios. At the Barcelona Open, he was defeated in the second round by sixth seed and world No. 15, Diego Schwartzman. At the BMW Open in Munich, he fell in the first round to Ilya Ivashka. In Madrid, he lost in the final round of qualifying to Hugo Dellien. At the Italian Open, he was defeated in the first round of qualifying by João Sousa. At the French Open, he upset 22nd seed, Nikoloz Basilashvili, in the second round. He lost in the third round to 11th seed and world No. 12, Jannik Sinner.

McDonald started his grass-court season at the Libéma Open. He lost in the first round to Ilya Ivashka. At the Halle Open, he was defeated in the second round by fourth seed and world No. 9, Félix Auger-Aliassime. At the Mallorca Championships, he lost in the second round to Marcos Giron. At Wimbledon, he was eliminated from the tournament in the second round by Richard Gasquet.

McDonald started his US Open series at the Atlanta Open. He lost in the second round to sixth seed, compatriot, and eventual finalist, Jenson Brooksby. Last year finalist at the Citi Open, he was defeated in the first round by Emil Ruusuvuori. At the National Bank Open in Montreal, he lost in the first round to Alex Molčan. In Cincinnati, he lost his second-round match to third seed Carlos Alcaraz. At the US Open, he lost in the first round to João Sousa in four sets.

At the 2022 Rakuten Japan Open Tennis Championships, he won his maiden doubles title partnering Marcelo Melo after defeating third seeds Rafael Matos and David Vega Hernández. As a result he reached the top 100 at a new career-high doubles ranking of No. 96 on 10 October 2022.

McDonald ended the year ranked 63.

=== 2023: First Masters quarterfinal and ATP final, top 40, 100th career win ===
McDonald started his 2023 season in Adelaide. At the first tournament, he lost in the second round to Yoshihito Nishioka. In doubles, he and his partner, Marcelo Melo, upset top seeds Wesley Koolhof and Neal Skupski in the second round. They reached the semifinals where they lost to Lloyd Glasspool and Harri Heliövaara, who ended up winning the tournament. At the second tournament, he ousted fifth seed, Dan Evans, in the first round. He was defeated in the second round by qualifier Mikael Ymer. At the Australian Open, he won his first round match in five sets over compatriot Brandon Nakashima. In the second round, he defeated the injured Rafael Nadal. He lost in the third round to 31st seed Yoshihito Nishioka.

After the Australian Open, McDonald represented the USA in the Davis Cup tie against Uzbekistan. Making his debut, he played one match and beat Sergey Fomin. The USA won the tie over Uzbekistan 4-0 to reach the Davis Cup Finals. At the Dallas Open, he lost in the second round to second seed, world No. 14, and compatriot, Frances Tiafoe. In Delray Beach, he beat fifth seed, Yoshihito Nishioka, in the second round. In the quarterfinals, he defeated compatriot Michael Mmoh. He lost his semifinal match to top seed, world No. 7, compatriot and eventual champion Taylor Fritz. At the Mexican Open, he reached the quarterfinals where he lost to seventh seed, world No. 23, compatriot and eventual finalist Tommy Paul. In doubles, he and his partner, compatriot Ben Shelton, upset fourth seeds Juan Sebastián Cabal and Robert Farah in the first round. They lost in the quarterfinals to André Göransson and Ben McLachlan. At the Indian Wells Masters, he was defeated in the second round by seventh seed and world No. 8, Holger Rune. At the Miami Open, he beat 19th seed and world No. 23, Matteo Berrettini, in the second round. He was beaten in the third round by Quentin Halys.

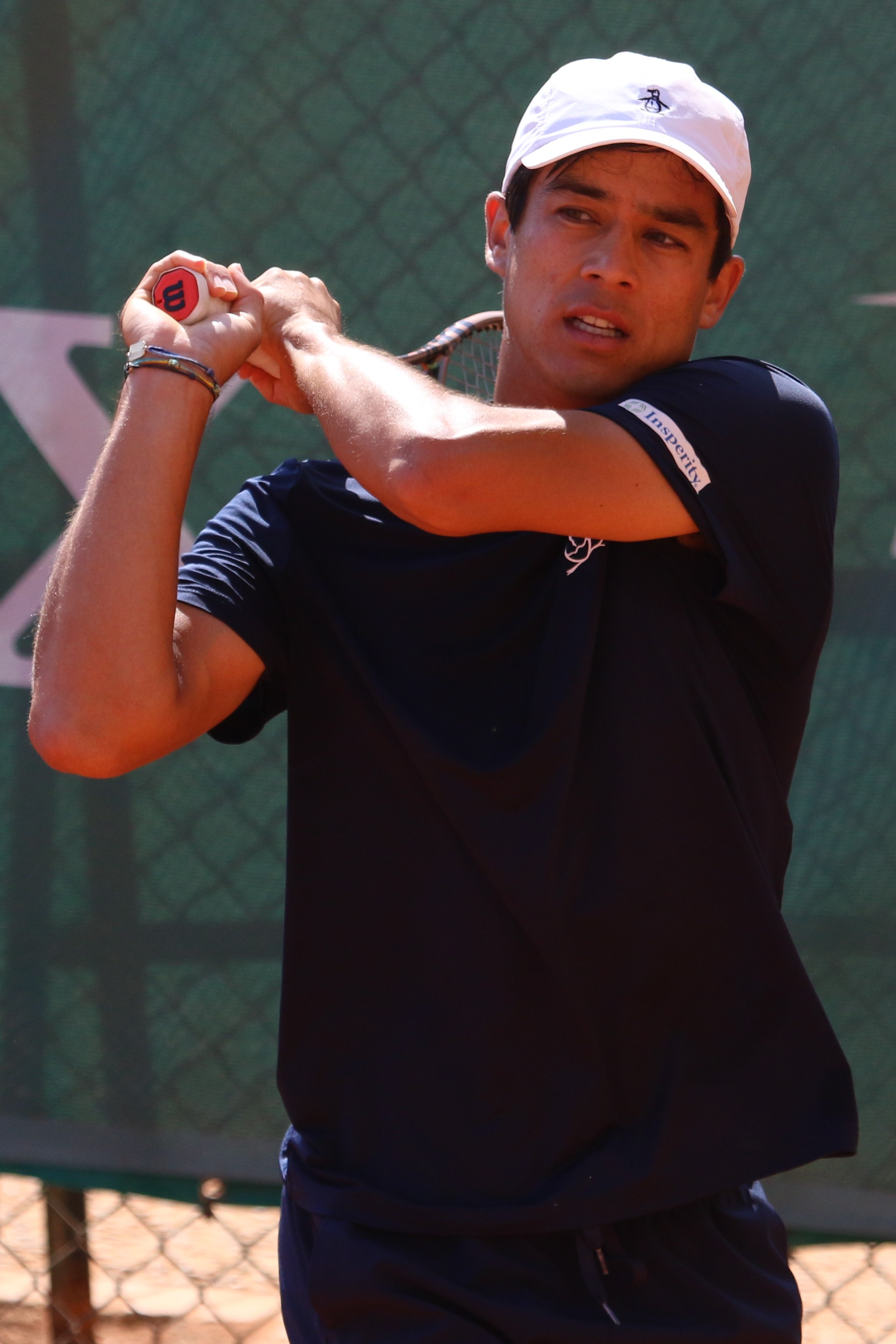
McDonald at the 2023 Monte-Carlo Masters

McDonald started his clay-court season at the Monte-Carlo Masters. He lost in the first round to qualifier Ivan Gakhov. At the Barcelona Open, he was defeated in the first round by Ben Shelton. In Madrid, he lost in the first round to Bernabé Zapata Miralles in three sets, despite having two match points in the third set. Seeded third at the Sardegna Open, he fell in the second round to Taro Daniel. At the Italian Open, he lost in the first round to Italian Marco Cecchinato. In doubles, he and Frances Tiafoe reached the quarterfinals where they lost to eventual champions Hugo Nys and Jan Zieliński. At the French Open, he was defeated in the first round by 24th seed, world No. 30, and compatriot, Sebastian Korda, in straight sets. In doubles, he and Marcos Giron beat two-time champions Pierre-Hugues Herbert and Nicolas Mahut in the first round. They lost in the second round to 14th seeds Máximo González and Andrés Molteni.

McDonald started his grass-court season at the Surbiton Trophy. Seeded third, he fell in the first round to Jordan Thompson. At the Libéma Open, he upset third seed and world No. 15, Borna Ćorić, in the second round. He lost in the quarterfinals to lucky loser Rinky Hijikata. Getting past qualifying at the Queen's Club Championships, he was defeated in the first round by Diego Schwartzman. At the Eastbourne International, he upset top seed, world No. 9, and two-time champion, Taylor Fritz, in the second round in two tie-breaker sets. Next he defeated Mikael Ymer to reach the semifinals.

At the 2023 Citi Open he reached his second doubles final with Ben Shelton.

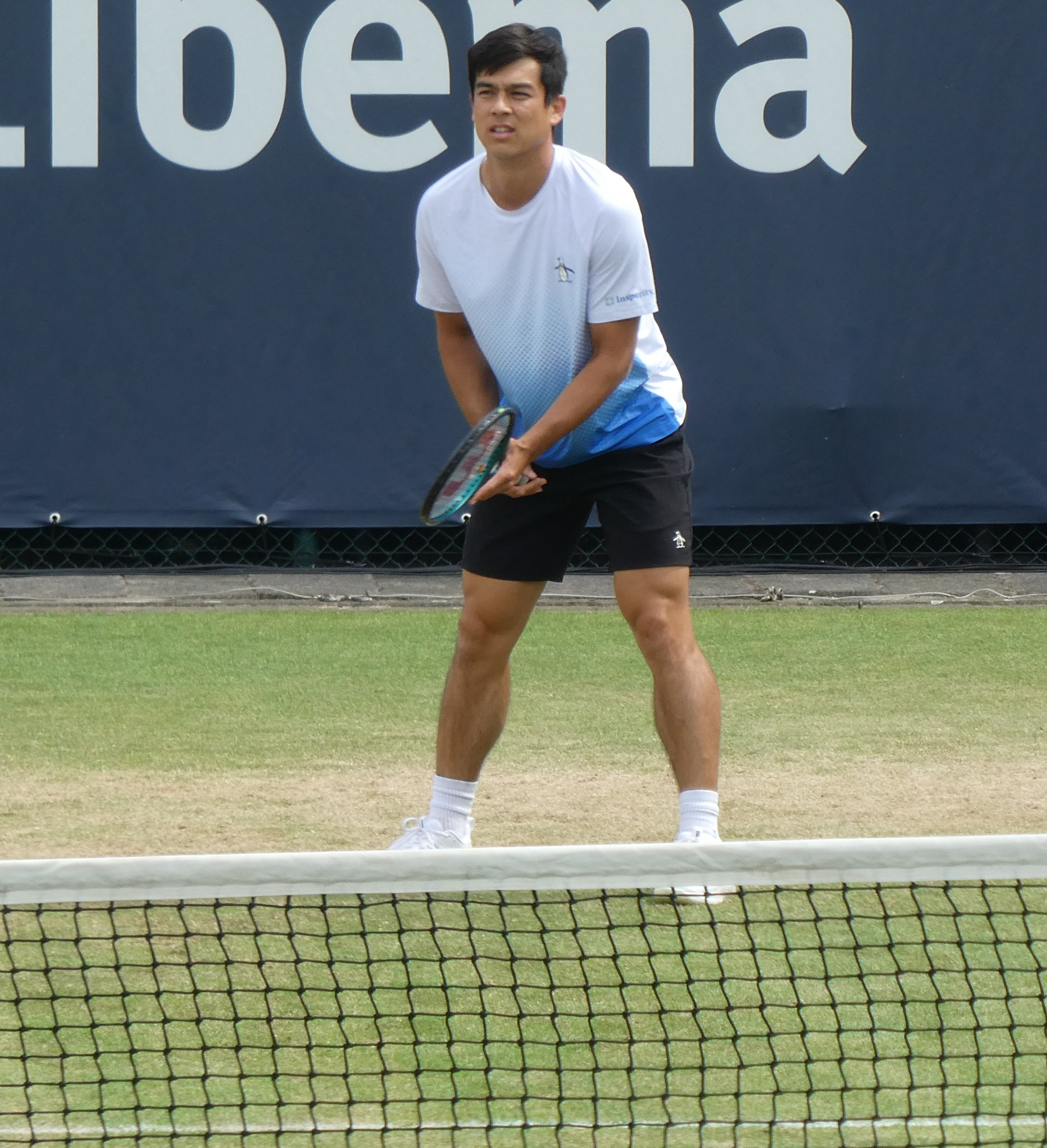
McDonald at the 2024 Libéma Open

At the 2023 National Bank Open he reached his first Masters 1000 quarterfinal upsetting sixth seed Andrey Rublev and wildcard Milos Raonic before losing to Alejandro Davidovich Fokina. As a result he reached a new career-high ranking in the top 40 of world No. 39 on 21 August 2023. He received a wildcard for the next Asian swing tournament, the 2023 China Open in Beijing where he lost to Grigor Dimitrov. He recorded his 100th career win at the 2023 Rolex Paris Masters over compatriot J. J. Wolf.

== Personal life ==
McDonald, nicknamed "Mackie", is of Chinese, Scottish and English descent.

In April 2025, he became engaged to fellow tennis player Maria Mateas.

== Performance timelines ==
Key
W	F	SF	QF	#R	RR	Q#	P#	DNQ	A	Z#	PO	G	S	B	NMS	NTI	P	NH

(W) winner; (F) finalist; (SF) semifinalist; (QF) quarterfinalist; (#R) rounds 4, 3, 2, 1; (RR) round-robin stage; (Q#) qualification round; (DNQ) did not qualify; (A) absent; (NH) not held; (SR) strike rate (events won / competed); (W–L) win–loss record.
To avoid confusion and double counting, these charts are updated at the conclusion of a tournament or when the player's participation has ended.

=== Singles ===
Current through the 2026 U.S. Men's Clay Court Championships.

Tournament	2013	2014	2015	2016	2017	2018	2019	2020	2021	2022	2023	2024	2025	2026	SR	W–L	Win%
Grand Slam tournaments
Australian Open	A	A	A	A	A	2R	2R	1R	4R	2R	3R	1R	Q3	1R	0 / 8	8–8	50%
French Open	A	A	A	A	Q2	A	1R	2R	2R	3R	1R	1R	1R		0 / 7	4–7	36%
Wimbledon	A	A	A	A	Q2	4R	A	NH	1R	2R	1R	1R	1R		0 / 6	4–6	40%
US Open	Q1	Q1	A	1R	Q2	1R	A	1R	2R	1R	2R	1R	1R		0 / 8	2–8	20%
Win–loss	0–0	0–0	0–0	0–1	0–0	4–3	1–2	1–3	5–4	4–4	3–4	0–4	0–3	0–1	0 / 29	18–29	38%
ATP Masters 1000
Indian Wells Masters	A	A	Q2	1R	A	Q2	2R	NH	2R	2R	2R	A	2R	2R	0 / 7	6–7	46%
Miami Open	A	A	A	A	A	Q2	2R	NH	2R	3R	3R	A	1R	Q1	0 / 5	6–5	55%
Monte-Carlo Masters	A	A	A	A	A	A	A	NH	A	A	1R	A	A	A	0 / 1	0–1	0%
Madrid Open	A	A	A	A	A	A	Q1	NH	A	Q2	1R	A	Q1		0 / 1	0–1	0%
Italian Open	A	A	A	A	A	A	A	A	A	Q1	1R	1R	A		0 / 2	0–2	0%
Canadian Open	A	A	A	A	A	1R	A	NH	1R	1R	QF	1R	2R		0 / 6	4–6	40%
Cincinnati Masters	1R	Q1	A	A	Q2	1R	A	1R	2R	2R	3R	Q2	1R		0 / 7	4–7	36%
Shanghai Masters	A	A	A	A	A	2R	A	NH			2R	A	1R		0 / 3	2–3	40%
Paris Masters	A	A	A	A	A	Q1	A	A	1R	Q1	2R	A	A		0 / 2	1–2	33%
Win–loss	0–1	0–0	0–0	0–1	0–0	1–3	2–2	0–1	3–5	4–4	10–9	0–2	2–5	1–1	0 / 34	23–34	40%
Career statistics
Tournament	2013	2014	2015	2016	2017	2018	2019	2020	2021	2022	2023	2024	2025	2026	SR	W–L	Win%
Tournaments	1	0	0	3	0	13	12	8	19	28	27	13	17	4	Career total: 145		
Titles	0	0	0	0	0	0	0	0	0	0	0	0	0				
Career total: 0
Finals	0	0	0	0	0	0	0	0	1	0	0	0	0				
Career total: 1
Overall win–loss	0–1	0–0	0–0	0–3	0–0	9–13	10–12	4–8	18–19	26–28	33–28	5–13	10–17	2–4	0 / 141	117–146	44%
Year-end ranking	673	642	371	321	176	78	129	193	55	63	41	131	114				

=== Doubles ===
Current through the 2025 US Open.

Tournament	2016	2017	2018	2019	2020	2021	2022	2023	2024	SR	W–L	Win%
Grand Slam tournaments
Australian Open	A	A	A	1R	A	2R	1R	A	1R	0 / 4	1–4	20%
French Open	A	A	A	1R	1R	1R	3R	2R	2R	0 / 6	4–6	40%
Wimbledon	A	A	Q1	A	NH	A	1R	1R	2R	0 / 3	1–3	25%
US Open	1R	A	2R	A	QF	1R	1R	3R	1R	0 / 7	5–7	42%
Win–loss	0–1	0–0	1–1	0–2	2–2	1–3	2–4	3–3	2–4	0 / 20	11–20	35%

== ATP 1000 tournaments finals ==
=== Doubles: 1 (runner-up) ===
Result	Year	Tournament	Surface	Partner	Opponents	Score
Loss	2024	Cincinnati Open	Hard	(United States) Alex Michelsen	(El Salvador) Marcelo Arévalo (Croatia) Mate Pavić	2–6, 4–6

== ATP Tour finals ==
=== Singles: 1 (runner-up) ===
Legend Grand Slam (–) ATP 1000 (–) ATP 500 (0–1) ATP 250 (–)	Finals by surface Hard (0–1) Clay (–) Grass (–)	Finals by setting Outdoor (0–1) Indoor (–)

Result	W–L	Date	Tournament	Tier	Surface	Opponent	Score
Loss	0–1	Aug 2021	Washington Open, US	ATP 500	Hard	(Italy) Jannik Sinner	5–7, 6–4, 5–7

=== Doubles: 3 (1 title, 2 runner-ups) ===
Legend Grand Slam (–) ATP 1000 (0–1) ATP 500 (1–1) ATP 250 (–)	Finals by surface Hard (1–2) Clay (–) Grass (–)	Finals by setting Outdoor (1–2) Indoor (–)

Result	W–L	Date	Tournament	Tier	Surface	Partner	Opponents	Score
Win	1–0	Oct 2022	Japan Open, Japan	ATP 500	Hard	(Brazil) Marcelo Melo	(Brazil) Rafael Matos (Spain) David Vega Hernández	6–4, 3–6, [10–4]
Loss	1–1	Jul 2023	Washington Open, US	ATP 500	Hard	(United States) Ben Shelton	(Argentina) Máximo González (Argentina) Andrés Molteni	7–6^{(7–4)}, 2–6, [6–10]
Loss	1–2	Aug 2024	Cincinnati Open, US	ATP 1000	Hard	(United States) Alex Michelsen	(El Salvador) Marcelo Arévalo (Croatia) Mate Pavić	2–6, 4–6

== ATP Challenger and ITF Tour finals ==
=== Singles: 13 (6 titles, 7 runner-ups) ===
Legend ATP Challenger Tour (4–6) ITF Futures (2–1)	Finals by surface Hard (6–7) Clay (–)

Result	W–L	Date	Tournament	Tier	Surface	Opponent	Score
Win	1–0	Oct 2017	Fairfield Challenger, US	Challenger	Hard	(United States) Bradley Klahn	6–4, 6–2
Loss	1–1	Jan 2018	RBC Tennis Championships of Dallas, US	Challenger	Hard (i)	(Japan) Kei Nishikori	1–6, 4–6
Win	2–1	Apr 2018	Seoul Open Challenger, South Korea	Challenger	Hard	(Australia) Jordan Thompson	1–6, 6–4, 6–1
Loss	2–2	Feb 2019	RBC Tennis Championships of Dallas, US	Challenger	Hard (i)	(United States) Mitchell Krueger	6–4, 6–7^{(3–7)}, 1–6
Win	3–2	Feb 2021	Nur-Sultan Challenger, Kazakhstan	Challenger	Hard (i)	(Austria) Jurij Rodionov	6–1, 6–2
Loss	3–3	Sep 2024	Nonthaburi Challenger, Thailand	Challenger	Hard	(Chinese Taipei) Wu Tung-lin	3–6, 6–7^{(4–7)}
Loss	3–4	Oct 2024	Hangzhou Challenger, China	Challenger	Hard	(Australia) James Duckworth	6–2, 6–7^{(5–7)}, 4–6
Win	4–4	Oct 2024	Shenzhen Longhua Open, China	Challenger	Hard	(France) Arthur Cazaux	6–4, 7–6^{(7–4)}
Loss	4–5	Feb 2025	San Diego Open, US	Challenger	Hard	(United States) Eliot Spizzirri	4–6, 6–2, 4–6
Loss	4–6	Oct 2025	Jinan Open, China	Challenger	Hard	(France) Arthur Cazaux	3–6, 2–6

Result	W–L	Date	Tournament	Tier	Surface	Opponent	Score
Loss	0–1	Sep 2015	F26 Claremont, US	Futures	Hard	(United States) Deiton Baughman	6–2, 3–6, 3–6
Win	1–1	Sep 2016	F29 Irvine, US	Futures	Hard	(Germany) Jan Choinski	6–0, 6–3
Win	2–1	Jan 2017	F1 Los Angeles, US	Futures	Hard	(Sweden) Carl Söderlund	6–4, 6–0

=== Doubles: 9 (7 titles, 2 runner-ups) ===
Legend ATP Challenger Tour (2–1) ITF Futures (5–1)	Finals by surface Hard (7–2) Clay (–)

Result	W–L	Date	Tournament	Tier	Surface	Partner	Opponents	Score
Loss	0–1	Aug 2016	Nordic Naturals Challenger, US	Challenger	Hard	(New Zealand) Ben McLachlan	(South Africa) Nicolaas Scholtz (South Africa) Tucker Vorster	7–6^{(7–5)}, 3–6, [8–10]
Win	1–1	Oct 2016	Fairfield Challenger, US	Challenger	Hard	(United States) Brian Baker	(United States) Sekou Bangoura (United States) Eric Quigley	6–3, 6–4
Win	2–1	Jan 2018	City of Playford Tennis International, Australia	Challenger	Hard	(United States) Tommy Paul	(Australia) Maverick Banes (Australia) Jason Kubler	7–6^{(7–4)}, 6–4

Result	W–L	Date	Tournament	Tier	Surface	Partner	Opponents	Score
Win	1–0	Sep 2013	F24 Costa Mesa, US	Futures	Hard	(United States) Marcos Giron	(South Africa) Keith-Patrick Crowley (South Africa) Matt Fawcett	6–3, 6–2
Win	2–0	Jun 2014	F17 Oklahoma City, US	Futures	Hard	(United States) Martin Redlicki	(Venezuela) Jesús Bandrés (Ecuador) Gonzalo Escobar	4–6, 7–6^{(7–3)}, [10–8]
Loss	2–1	Sep 2014	F25 Costa Mesa, US	Futures	Hard	(United States) Martin Redlicki	(United States) Nicholas Hunter (United States) Junior Alexander Ore	6–4, 4–6, [8–10]
Win	3–1	Sep 2015	F27 Costa Mesa, US	Futures	Hard	(United States) Martin Redlicki	(United States) Jean-Yves Aubone (Zimbabwe) Benjamin Lock	6–2, 3–6, [10–5]
Win	4–1	Sep 2016	F29 Irvine, US	Futures	Hard	(United States) Deiton Baughman	(United States) Timothy Sah (United States) Ryan Seggerman	6–4, 6–3
Win	5–1	Apr 2017	F12 Memphis, US	Futures	Hard	(United Kingdom) Lloyd Glasspool	(Canada) Philip Bester (United States) Alex Lawson	6–2, 7–6^{(7–3)}

== Wins over top 10 players ==
- McDonald has a 5–19 record against players who were, at the time the match was played, ranked in the top 10.

Season	2019	2020	2021	2022	2023	2024	2025	Total
Wins	1	0	0	0	4	0	0	5

#	Player	Rank	Event	Surface	Rd	Score	MMR	Ref
2019
1.	(Argentina) Juan Martín del Potro	4	Delray Beach Open, United States	Hard	QF	6–4, 3–6, 7–6^{(7–5)}	84	
2023
2.	(Spain) Rafael Nadal	2	Australian Open, Australia	Hard	2R	6–4, 6–4, 7–5	65	
3.	(United States) Taylor Fritz	9	Eastbourne International, United Kingdom	Grass	2R	7–6^{(7–3)}, 7–6^{(10–8)}	64	
4.	Andrey Rublev	7	Canadian Open, Canada	Hard	2R	6–4, 6–3	59	
5.	(Denmark) Holger Rune	5	Cincinnati Masters, United States	Hard	2R	6–4, 2–0 ret.	43	

Awards
Preceded by (Canada) Vasek Pospisil	ATP Comeback Player of the Year; 2021	Succeeded by (Croatia) Borna Ćorić
