= 2021 Nur-Sultan Challenger – Doubles =

Doubles
- 2021 Nur-Sultan Challenger

Final
- Champions: (Ukraine) Denys Molchanov (Kazakhstan) Aleksandr Nedovyesov
- Runners-up: (United States) Nathan Pasha (United States) Max Schnur
- Score: 6–4, 6–4

Events
Singles	Doubles
- Nur-Sultan Challenger

There were no defending champions as the last edition of the tournament was canceled due to the COVID-19 pandemic.

Denys Molchanov and Aleksandr Nedovyesov won the title after defeating Nathan Pasha and Max Schnur 6–4, 6–4 in the final.

== Seeds ==
1. (Ukraine) Denys Molchanov / (Kazakhstan) Aleksandr Nedovyesov (champions)
2. (United States) Nathan Pasha / (United States) Max Schnur (final)
3. (Germany) Julian Lenz / (Ecuador) Roberto Quiroz (semifinals)
4. (Canada) Peter Polansky / (Canada) Brayden Schnur (quarterfinals)

== Draw ==
Key

- Q = Qualifier
- WC = Wild card
- LL = Lucky loser
- Alt = Alternate
- ITF = ITF entry
- PR = Protected ranking
- SR = Special ranking
- SE = Special exempt
- JE = Junior exempt
- JR = Junior Accelerator Programme entrant
- CO = College Accelerator Programme entrant
- NG = Next Gen Accelerator Program entrant
- w/o = Walkover
- r = Retired
- d = Defaulted

First round
1	(Ukraine) D Molchanov (Kazakhstan) A Nedovyesov	6	6
WC	(Kazakhstan) Sagadat Ayap (Kazakhstan) Danil Ozernoy	3	1
(Kazakhstan) G Lomakin (Ukraine) V Manafov	6	2	[6]
(Russia) P Kotov (Chinese Taipei) T-l Wu	3	6	[10]
3	(Germany) J Lenz (Ecuador) R Quiroz	6	7^{10}
(Russia) I Nedelko (United Kingdom) R Peniston	2	6^{8}
(Germany) M Marterer (Slovenia) B Rola	4	4
(France) H Grenier (France) A Müller	6	6
(Portugal) F Ferreira Silva (Czech Republic) T Macháč	6	5	[7]
(Uzbekistan) D Istomin (Kazakhstan) D Yevseyev	3	7	[10]
WC	(Kazakhstan) T Skatov (Kazakhstan) Dostanbek Tashbulatov	2	1
4	(Canada) P Polansky (Canada) B Schnur	6	6
(Georgia (country)) A Metreveli (Kazakhstan) D Popko	6	6
WC	(Russia) Yan Bondarevskiy (Czech Republic) D Palán	3	4
Alt	(Russia) B Bobrov (Russia) A Zakharov	3	6^{3}
2	(United States) N Pasha (United States) M Schnur	6	7^{7}

Quarterfinals
1	(Ukraine) D Molchanov (Kazakhstan) A Nedovyesov	w/o
(Russia) P Kotov (Chinese Taipei) T-l Wu
3	(Germany) J Lenz (Ecuador) R Quiroz	6	6
(France) H Grenier (France) A Müller	4	3
(Uzbekistan) D Istomin (Kazakhstan) D Yevseyev	6	6
4	(Canada) P Polansky (Canada) B Schnur	0	3
(Georgia (country)) A Metreveli (Kazakhstan) D Popko	5	6^{5}
2	(United States) N Pasha (United States) M Schnur	7	7^{7}

Semifinals
1	(Ukraine) D Molchanov (Kazakhstan) A Nedovyesov	4	6	[10]
3	(Germany) J Lenz (Ecuador) R Quiroz	6	3	[4]
(Uzbekistan) D Istomin (Kazakhstan) D Yevseyev	6	1	[9]
2	(United States) N Pasha (United States) M Schnur	4	6	[11]

Final
1	(Ukraine) D Molchanov (Kazakhstan) A Nedovyesov	6	6
2	(United States) N Pasha (United States) M Schnur	4	4
