= Max Schnur =

American tennis player

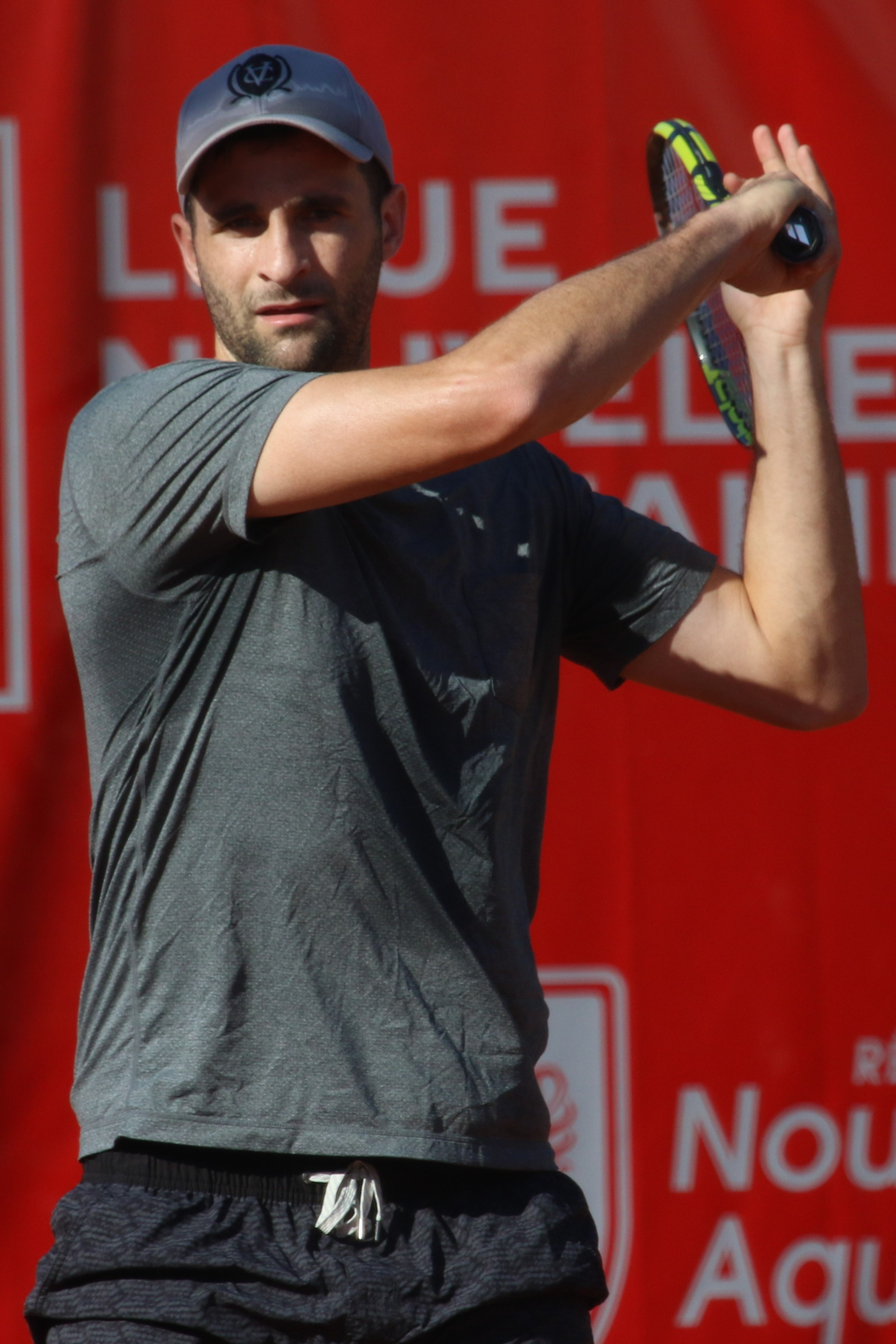
- Schnur at the 2022 BNP Paribas Primrose Bordeaux
- Full name: Max Jacob Schnur
- Country (sports): United States
- Residence: New York City, United States
- Born: February 15, 1993 (age 33) Richmond, Virginia, United States
- Height: 1.96 m (6 ft 5 in)
- Turned pro: 2015
- Plays: Right-handed (two-handed backhand)
- College: Columbia
- Prize money: $ 152,397

Singles
- Career record: 0–0
- Career titles: 0
- Highest ranking: No. 1464 (10 October 2016)

Doubles
- Career record: 6–18
- Career titles: 0
- Highest ranking: No. 87 (12 September 2022)

Grand Slam doubles results
- Wimbledon: 2R (2022)
- US Open: 1R (2022)

Max Jacob Schnur (born 15 February 1993) is an American inactive tennis player mostly playing on the ATP Challenger Tour, specializing in doubles. His highest ATP doubles ranking of World No. 87 was achieved on 12 September 2022.

== College career ==
Schnur graduated from Columbia University in 2015.

== Career finals ==
=== Doubles: 34 (18–15) ===
Legend (doubles) ATP Challenger Tour (12–11) ITF Futures Tour (6–4)	Titles by surface Hard (12–12) Clay (6–3) Grass (0–0)

Result	W–L	Date	Tournament	Tier	Surface	Partner	Opponents	Score
Loss	0–1	Jul 2014	Belgium F6, Knokke	Futures	Clay	(United States) Ashok Narayana	(Chile) Cristóbal Saavedra Corvalán (Chile) Ricardo Urzua-Rivera	4–6, 5–7
Loss	0–2	Jun 2015	USA F16B, Charlottesville	Futures	Hard	(United States) Gonzales Austin	(United States) Hunter Nicholas (New Zealand) Finn Tearney	2–6, 2–6
Loss	0–3	Jul 2015	USA F21, Wichita	Futures	Hard	(United States) Gonzales Austin	(Barbados) Darian King (India) Sanam Singh	3–6, 3–6
Loss	0–4	Jul 2015	Canada F5, Vancouver	Futures	Hard	(United States) Hunter Nicholas	(United States) Andre Dome (New Zealand) Finn Tearney	4–6, 4–6
Win	1–4	Oct 2015	Israel F13, Tel Aviv	Futures	Hard	(South Africa) Keith-Patrick Crowley	(United States) Eric James Johnson (United States) John Lamble	6–7^{(1–7)}, 6–3, [10–3]
Win	2–4	Oct 2015	Israel F15, Tel Aviv	Futures	Hard	(South Africa) Keith-Patrick Crowley	(Israel) Oz Daniel (United States) Eric James Johnson	7–6^{(7–5)}, 6–2
Win	3–4	Dec 2015	Dominican Republic F1, Santiago	Futures	Clay	(United States) Raleigh Smith	(Portugal) Gonçalo Oliveira (Germany) Peter Torebko	7–6^{(9–7)}, 6–2
Win	4–4	Dec 2015	Dominican Republic F2, Santo Domingo	Futures	Clay	(South Africa) Keith-Patrick Crowley	(Argentina) Juan Ignacio Galarza (Argentina) Facundo Mena	4–6, 6–4, [10–5]
Win	5–4	Dec 2015	Dominican Republic F3, Santo Domingo Este	Futures	Hard	(South Africa) Keith-Patrick Crowley	(Argentina) Mateo Nicolas Martinez (Mexico) Luis Patiño	7–6^{(7–3)}, 6–2
Win	6–4	Mar 2016	Canada F2, Sherbrooke	Futures	Hard (i)	(South Africa) Keith-Patrick Crowley	(United Kingdom) Luke Bambridge (United Kingdom) Liam Broady	3–6, 7–6^{(7–3)}, [10–6]
Win	7–4	Mar 2016	Drummondville, Canada	Challenger	Hard (i)	(United States) James Cerretani	(United Kingdom) Dan Evans (United Kingdom) Lloyd Glasspool	3–6, 6–3, [11–9]
Win	8–4	Jun 2016	Milan, Italy	Challenger	Clay	(Mexico) Miguel Ángel Reyes-Varela	(Italy) Alessandro Motti (Chinese Taipei) Peng Hsien-yin	1–6, 7–6^{(7–4)}, [10–5]
Loss	8–5	Jul 2016	Marburg, Germany	Challenger	Clay	(Mexico) Miguel Ángel Reyes-Varela	(United States) James Cerretani (Austria) Philipp Oswald	3–6, 2–6
Win	9–5	Jul 2016	Tampere, Finland	Challenger	Clay	(Spain) David Pérez Sanz	(Australia) Steven de Waard (Germany) Andreas Mies	6–4, 6–4
Win	10–5	Jan 2017	Happy Valley, Australia	Challenger	Hard	(Chile) Hans Podlipnik-Castillo	(Australia) Steven de Waard (Australia) Marc Polmans	7–6^{(7–5)}, 4–6, [10–6]
Win	11–5	Jun 2017	Caltanissetta, Italy	Challenger	Clay	(United States) James Cerretani	(Ukraine) Denys Molchanov (Croatia) Franko Škugor	6–3, 3–6, [10–6]
Loss	11–6	Feb 2018	Burnie, Australia	Challenger	Hard	(United States) Evan King	(Spain) Marcel Granollers (Spain) Gerard Granollers	6–7^{(8–10)}, 2–6
Loss	11–7	Jun 2019	Little Rock, United States	Challenger	Hard	(Philippines) Treat Huey	(Argentina) Matias Franco Descotte (Brazil) Orlando Luz	5–7, 6–1, [10–12]
Loss	11–8	Sep 2019	Columbus, United States	Challenger	Hard (i)	(United States) Nathan Pasha	(United States) Martin Redlicki (United States) Jackson Withrow	4–6, 6–7^{(4–7)}
Loss	11–9	Oct 2019	Las Vegas, United States	Challenger	Hard	(United States) Nathan Pasha	(Philippines) Ruben Gonzales (South Africa) Ruan Roelofse	6–2, 3–6, [8–10]
Win	12–9	Mar 2020	Calgary, Canada	Challenger	Hard (i)	(United States) Nathan Pasha	(Canada) Filip Peliwo (Australia) Harry Bourchier	7–6^{(7–4)}, 6–3
Loss	12–10	Feb 2021	Nur-Sultan, Kazakhstan	Challenger	Hard (i)	(United States) Nathan Pasha	(Ukraine) Denys Molchanov (Kazakhstan) Aleksandr Nedovyesov	4–6, 4–6
Loss	12–11	Mar 2021	Nur-Sultan, Kazakhstan	Challenger	Hard (i)	(United States) Nathan Pasha	(United States) Nathaniel Lammons (United States) Jackson Withrow	4–6, 2–6
Win	13–11	Sep 2021	Cary, USA	Challenger	Hard	(United States) William Blumberg	(United States) Stefan Kozlov (Canada) Peter Polansky	6–4, 1–6, [10–4]
Loss	13–12	Oct 2021	Santiago, Chile	Challenger	Clay	(United States) Evan King	(Ecuador) Diego Hidalgo (Chile) Nicolás Jarry	3–6, 7–5, [6–10]
Win	14–12	Oct 2021	Santiago, Chile	Challenger	Clay	(United States) Evan King	(Mexico) Hans Hach Verdugo (Mexico) Miguel Ángel Reyes-Varela	3–6, 7–6^{(7–3)}, [16–14]
Win	15–12	Oct 2021	Las Vegas, USA	Challenger	Hard	(United States) William Blumberg	(Chinese Taipei) Jason Jung (United States) Evan King	7–5, 6–7^{(5–7)}, [10–5]
Win	16–12	Nov 2021	Charlottesville, USA	Challenger	Hard (i)	(United States) William Blumberg	(Philippines) Treat Huey (Denmark) Frederik Nielsen	3–6, 6–1, [14–12]
Loss	16–13	Nov 2021	Champaign, USA	Challenger	Hard (i)	(Philippines) Treat Huey	(United States) Nathaniel Lammons (United States) Jackson Withrow	4–6, 6–3, [6–10]
Win	17–13	Jan 2022	Cleveland, USA	Challenger	Hard (i)	(United States) William Blumberg	(United States) Robert Galloway (United States) Jackson Withrow	6–3, 7–6^{(7–4)}
Loss	17–14	May 2022	Little Rock, USA	Challenger	Hard	(United States) Robert Galloway	(Australia) Andrew Harris (United States) Christian Harrison	3–6, 4–6
Loss	17–15	Jul 2022	Winnipeg, Canada	Challenger	Hard	(Australia) John-Patrick Smith	(United Kingdom) Billy Harris (Canada) Kelsey Stevenson	6–2, 6–7^{(9–11)}, [8–10]
Win	18–15	Oct 2022	Hamburg, Germany	Challenger	Hard (i)	(Philippines) Treat Huey	(Jamaica) Dustin Brown (Germany) Julian Lenz	7–6^{(8–6)}, 6–4
