= Nathan Pasha =

American tennis player

- Country (sports): United States
- Residence: Atlanta, United States
- Born: July 15, 1992 (age 33) Atlanta, United States
- Height: 1.91 m (6 ft 3 in)
- Plays: Right-handed (two-handed backhand)
- College: University of Georgia
- Prize money: $109,961

Singles
- Career record: 0–1 (at ATP Tour level, Grand Slam level, and in Davis Cup)
- Career titles: 0 Challenger, 0 Futures
- Highest ranking: No. 507 (7 January 2019)

Doubles
- Career record: 0–4 (at ATP Tour level, Grand Slam level, and in Davis Cup)
- Career titles: 2 Challenger, 6 Futures
- Highest ranking: No. 119 (3 December 2018)

Grand Slam doubles results
- US Open: 1R (2010, 2018)

Grand Slam mixed doubles results
- US Open: 2R (2021)

Nathan Pasha (born July 15, 1992) is an American tennis player.

Pasha has a career high ATP singles ranking of No. 507 achieved on 7 January 2019 and a career high ATP doubles ranking of No. 119 achieved on 3 December 2018.

Pasha made his ATP main draw debut at the 2010 US Open in the doubles draw partnering Sekou Bangoura. Pasha also played college tennis at the University of Georgia.

== Challenger and Futures finals ==
=== Singles: 1 (0–1) ===
Legend (singles) ATP Challenger Tour (0–0) ITF Futures Tour (0–1)	Titles by surface Hard (0–0) Clay (0–1) Grass (0–0) Carpet (0–0)

Result	W–L	Date	Tournament	Tier	Surface	Opponent	Score
Loss	0–1	Jul 2017	USA F22, Pittsburgh	Futures	Clay	(Japan) Kaichi Uchida	6–3, 6–7^{(5–7)}, 4–6

=== Doubles: 24 (8–16) ===
Legend (doubles) ATP Challenger Tour (2–9) ITF Futures Tour (6–7)	Titles by surface Hard (6–14) Clay (2–2) Grass (0–0) Carpet (0–0)

Result	W–L	Date	Tournament	Tier	Surface	Partner	Opponents	Score
Win	1–0	Jun 2015	USA F17, Buffalo	Futures	Clay	(United States) Sekou Bangoura	(Argentina) Maximiliano Estévez (Mexico) Daniel Garza	w/o
Loss	1–1	Sep 2015	Canada F10, Toronto	Futures	Hard	(United States) Raymond Sarmiento	(Serbia) Marko Tepavac (Japan) Kaichi Uchida	6–2, 4–6, [8–10]
Win	2–1	Sep 2015	Canada F11, Markham	Futures	Hard (i)	(United States) Raymond Sarmiento	(Serbia) Marko Tepavac (Japan) Kaichi Uchida	7–6^{(7–4)}, 6–2
Loss	2–2	Aug 2016	USA F26, Decatur	Futures	Hard	(United States) Dane Webb	(United States) Jared Hiltzik (United States) Rhyne Williams	0–6, 1–6
Win	3–2	Oct 2016	Australia F7, Toowoomba	Futures	Hard	(Australia) Darren Polkinghorne	(Australia) Maverick Banes (Australia) Gavin van Peperzeel	6–3, 6–4
Loss	3–3	Oct 2016	Australia F8, Cairns	Futures	Hard	(Australia) Darren Polkinghorne	(Australia) Marc Polmans (Australia) Luke Saville	6–4, 3–6, [7–10]
Win	4–3	Feb 2017	Indonesia F2, Jakarta	Futures	Hard	(United States) Evan King	(Japan) Soichiro Moritani (Japan) Masato Shiga	6–3, 6–7^{(8–10)}, [10–6]
Win	5–3	Mar 2017	Australia F2, Canberra	Futures	Clay	(United States) Evan King	(Australia) Maverick Banes (Australia) Gavin van Peperzeel	4–6, 6–3, [10–4]
Loss	5–4	Jul 2017	USA F22, Pittsburgh	Futures	Clay	(United Kingdom) Farris Fathi Gosea	(Canada) Hugo Di Feo (Denmark) Mikael Torpegaard	3–6, 4–6
Loss	5–5	Sep 2017	Serbia F5, Novi Sad	Futures	Clay	(Republic of Ireland) Julian Bradley	(Croatia) Domagoj Bilješko (Croatia) Ivan Sabanov	6–0, 2–6, [3–10]
Loss	5–6	Oct 2017	Australia F5, Brisbane	Futures	Hard	(Australia) Darren Polkinghorne	(Australia) Maverick Banes (Australia) Blake Ellis	6–4, 1–6, [4–10]
Loss	5–7	Oct 2017	Australia F6, Toowoomba	Futures	Hard	(Australia) Darren Polkinghorne	(China) Li Zhe (Australia) Bradley Mousley	4–6, 6–7^{(4–7)}
Win	6–7	Oct 2017	Australia F7, Cairns	Futures	Hard	(Australia) Darren Polkinghorne	(Philippines) Francis Casey Alcantara (Netherlands) Sem Verbeek	6–2, 2–6, [10–2]
Loss	6–8	Oct 2017	Traralgon, Australia	Challenger	Hard	(United States) Evan King	(Australia) Alex Bolt (Australia) Bradley Mousley	4–6, 2–6
Loss	6–9	Feb 2018	Launceston, Australia	Challenger	Hard	(United States) Sekou Bangoura	(Australia) Alex Bolt (Australia) Bradley Mousley	6–7^{(6–8)}, 0–6
Loss	6–10	Feb 2018	Morelos, Mexico	Challenger	Hard	(United States) Evan King	(Venezuela) Roberto Maytín (Brazil) Fernando Romboli	5–7, 3–6
Loss	6–11	Mar 2018	Indian Wells, USA	Challenger	Hard	(United States) Evan King	(United States) Austin Krajicek (United States) Jackson Withrow	7–6^{(7–3)}, 1–6, [9–11]
Loss	6–12	Apr 2018	Panama City, Panama	Challenger	Hard	(Ecuador) Roberto Quiroz	(Germany) Yannick Hanfmann (Germany) Kevin Krawietz	6–7^{(4–7)}, 4–6
Win	7–12	Oct 2018	Calgary, Canada	Challenger	Hard (i)	(United States) Robert Galloway	(Australia) Matt Reid (Australia) John-Patrick Smith	6–4, 4–6, [10–6]
Loss	7–13	Oct 2018	Las Vegas, USA	Challenger	Hard	(United States) Robert Galloway	(El Salvador) Marcelo Arévalo (Venezuela) Roberto Maytín	3–6, 3–6
Win	8–13	Apr 2019	Monterrey, Mexico	Challenger	Hard	(United States) Evan King	(Mexico) Santiago González (Pakistan) Aisam Qureshi	7–5, 6–2
Loss	8–14	Sep 2019	Columbus, USA	Challenger	Hard (i)	(United States) Max Schnur	(United States) Jackson Withrow (United States) Martin Redlicki	4–6, 6–7^{(4–7)}
Loss	8–15	Feb 2021	Nur-Sultan, Kazakhstan	Challenger	Hard (i)	(United States) Max Schnur	(Ukraine) Denys Molchanov (Kazakhstan) Aleksandr Nedovyesov	4-6, 4-6
Loss	8–16	Mar 2021	Nur-Sultan, Kazakhstan	Challenger	Hard (i)	(United States) Max Schnur	(United States) Nathaniel Lammons (United States) Jackson Withrow	4-6, 2-6
