= BeeTV Women's =

- 2023 BeeTV Women's 60

Defunct tennis tournament
- Event name: BeeTV Women's 60; Nur-Sultan Challenger
- Location: Astana, Kazakhstan
- Venue: National Tennis Center
- Surface: Hard (indoor)
- Website: ktf.kz
ATP Tour
- Category: Challenger 125 (2021)
- Draw: 48S / 4Q / 16D
WTA Tour
- Category: ITF Women's W60
- Draw: 32S / 32Q / 16D
- Prize money: $60,000 / $40,000

The BeeTV Women's (previously known as Nur-Sultan Challenger) was a professional tennis tournament played on indoor hardcourts held annually in Astana, Kazakhstan since 2019. It was part of the ITF Women's World Tennis Tour until 2023 and part of the ATP Challenger Tour until 2021.

== Past finals ==
=== Men's singles ===
Year	Champion	Runner-up	Score
2021 (2)	(Czech Republic) Tomáš Macháč	(Austria) Sebastian Ofner	4–6, 6–4, 6–4
2021 (1)	(United States) Mackenzie McDonald	(Austria) Jurij Rodionov	6–2, 6–1
2020	cancelled after the quarterfinal round due to the COVID-19 pandemic		
2019	(Ukraine) Illya Marchenko	(Germany) Yannick Maden	4–6, 6–4, 6–3

=== Women's singles ===
Year	Champion	Runner-up	Score
2023 (2)	(South Korea) Jang Su-jeong	(Japan) Moyuka Uchijima	6–1, 6–4
2023 (1)	Polina Kudermetova	Darya Astakhova	6–2, 6–3
2022 (2)	Anastasia Zakharova	Mariia Tkacheva	6–3, 6–1
2022 (1)	(Russia) Anzhelika Isaeva	(Belgium) Greet Minnen	6–4, 0–0 ret.

=== Men's doubles ===
Year	Champions	Runners-up	Score
2021 (2)	(United States) Nathaniel Lammons (United States) Jackson Withrow	(United States) Nathan Pasha (United States) Max Schnur	6–4, 6–2
2021 (1)	(Ukraine) Denys Molchanov (Kazakhstan) Aleksandr Nedovyesov	(United States) Nathan Pasha (United States) Max Schnur	6–4, 6–4
2020	cancelled after the quarterfinal round due to the COVID-19 pandemic		
2019	(Finland) Harri Heliövaara (Ukraine) Illya Marchenko	(Poland) Karol Drzewiecki (Poland) Szymon Walków	6–4, 6–4

=== Women's doubles ===
Year	Champions	Runners-up	Score
2023 (2)	Polina Kudermetova; Anastasia Tikhonova	(South Korea) Han Na-lae (South Korea) Jang Su-jeong	2–6, 6–3, [10–7]
2023 (1)	(Kazakhstan) Anna Danilina; Iryna Shymanovich	(South Korea) Han Na-lae (South Korea) Jang Su-jeong	6–4, 6–7^{(8–10)}, [10–7]
2022 (2)	(Latvia) Kamilla Bartone; Ekaterina Makarova	(Czech Republic) Anna Sisková; Maria Timofeeva	1–6, 7–5, [10–8]
2022 (1)	(Russia) Ekaterina Makarova (Czech Republic) Linda Nosková	(Czech Republic) Anna Sisková (Russia) Maria Timofeeva	6–2, 6–3
