= Next Gen ATP Finals =

Professional tennis exhibition competition

- 2026 Next Gen ATP Finals

ATP Tour
- Founded: 2017; 9 years ago
- Editions: 8
- Location: Milan, Italy (2017–2022); Jeddah, Saudi Arabia (2023–2025); Reggio Calabria, Italy (2026–)
- Venue: Fiera Milano (2017–2018), PalaLido (2019–2022); King Abdullah Sports City Stadium (2023–2025)
- Category: Exhibition
- Surface: Hard (indoor)
- Draw: 8S
- Prize money: US$2,000,000 (2026)
- Website: nextgenatpfinals.com

Current champions (2025)
- Singles: (United States) Learner Tien

The Next Gen ATP Finals is an annual men's professional exhibition tennis tournament organized by the Association of Tennis Professionals (ATP) for the best players of the season aged 20 years old or younger. The event debuted in 2017 at the Fiera Milano. After two years it was moved to the PalaLido in Milan, where it was staged for the next three editions (not held in 2020). It was then moved to King Abdullah Sports City in Jeddah, where it was held from 2023 until 2025. From 2017 to 2023 the age threshold was 21 years and under.

== Ranking points, prize money and other features ==
The tournament does not distribute points for the ATP rankings for the participants. The ATP does not count it as an official ATP Tour tournament victory, but matches count towards official win–loss season record. Prize money worth US $2,275,000 is distributed and counts to the players' totals. From the beginning, the tournament regularly has incorporated new and experimental features that may or may not be introduced into other tennis events later on. It pioneered the implementation of electronic line-calling (so called 'Hawk-Eye Live' completely replacing human line-judges) back in 2017. Other experimental features include scoring systems different from recognized tennis matches, players communicating with their coaches via headphones, and so on.

== History ==
Following a competitive bid process, the Association of Tennis Professionals (ATP) announced that the Italian Tennis Federation, in association with the Italian Olympic Committee, would organise a new ATP tournament featuring the world's top 21-and-under singles players of the ATP Tour season. The first five editions of the tournament were hosted in Milan, Italy from 2017 to 2022. Already in the first year, a special circumstance occurred. The 20-year-old Alexander Zverev played such a successful season that he was qualified at the same time for the Next Gen ATP Finals and for the ATP Finals of the best eight players from 2017. As the events were dated close and scheduled directly one after the other, the German prospect opted for the latter option.

In the 2024 season, the ATP announced an expansion of the Next Gen brand. In addition to lowering the age threshold from 21-and-under to 20-and-under, a Next Gen Accelerator Programme was introduced. This allows Next Gen labelled players who reach the top 350 of the ATP rankings up to 8 opportunities to enter the main draws of ATP Challenger Tour 125 and ATP Challenger Tour 100 events. Furthermore, those who reach the top 250 are provided a main draw entry for an ATP 250 event, along with two qualifying opportunities for them.

== Format ==
Played over five days, the format for the competition consists of two round robin groups, followed by the semifinals and final. Played on a singles-only court, the competition features the best eight qualified 20-and-under players of the season (until 2023 it featured the best seven players plus one wildcard).

== Rules ==
A number of rule changes from the normal ATP format are used for the competition:

- Best of five sets
- First to four games in each set
- Tiebreak at 3-All
- No-Ad scoring (server's choice in 2019, receiver's choice in 2018)
- Lets on serve (in 2018 lets on serve were counted "in")
- Live Electronic line calling/Hawkeye-Live (graphic shown on screens after a "close call")
- Start match 4 minutes from entry of second player on court (5 minutes in 2018)
- Shot clock to ensure 25-second rule, the shot clock is reduced to 15 seconds after a rally lasting less than 3 shots
- Maximum of one medical timeout per player per match
- Coaches can talk to players through headsets
- Public will be allowed to move around during a match (except at baselines)
- Towel boxes at each baseline
- Players can use wearable technology

== Qualification ==
The Top 8 eligible players, 20-and-under as of the end of that calendar year, in the ATP Race to Jeddah (formerly the Race to Milan) qualify. Until the 2023 edition, the Top 7 qualified and the eighth spot was reserved for a wildcard, the winner of a qualifying tournament.

== Results ==
=== Singles ===
Venue	Year	Champion	Runner-up	Score
(Italy) Milan	2017	(South Korea) Chung Hyeon	(Russia) Andrey Rublev	3–4^{(5–7)}, 4–3^{(7–2)}, 4–2, 4–2
(Italy) Milan	2018	(Greece) Stefanos Tsitsipas	(Australia) Alex de Minaur	2–4, 4–1, 4–3^{(7–3)}, 4–3^{(7–3)}
(Italy) Milan	2019	(Italy) Jannik Sinner	(Australia) Alex de Minaur	4–2, 4–1, 4–2
(Italy) Milan	2020	No competition due to the COVID-19 pandemic		
(Italy) Milan	2021	(Spain) Carlos Alcaraz	(United States) Sebastian Korda	4–3^{(7–5)}, 4–2, 4–2
(Italy) Milan	2022	(United States) Brandon Nakashima	(Czech Republic) Jiří Lehečka	4–3^{(7–5)}, 4–3^{(8–6)}, 4–2
(Saudi Arabia) Jeddah	2023	(Serbia) Hamad Medjedovic	(France) Arthur Fils	3–4^{(6–8)}, 4–1, 4–2, 3–4^{(9–11)}, 4–1
(Saudi Arabia) Jeddah	2024	(Brazil) João Fonseca	(United States) Learner Tien	2–4, 4–3^{(10–8)}, 4–0, 4–2
(Saudi Arabia) Jeddah	2025	(United States) Learner Tien	(Belgium) Alexander Blockx	4–3^{(7–4)}, 4–2, 4–1
(Italy) Reggio Calabria	2026			

== Next Gen ATP Finals appearances ==
Key
**W**	Winner
F	Runner-up
SF	Lost in semi-finals
RR	Lost in Round Robin group stage
(A)	Alternate (did not play from the beginning)
(A')	Alternate (played from the beginning, original player withdrew before the tournament)
(R)	Withdrew during the tournament
(WC)	Entered as a Wildcard
(NP)	Did not play
↓Older format (2017–2018 only)↓
3^{rd}	Won third place match
4^{th}	Lost third place match

Note

When there are more than eight players listed for any year, it is usually due to withdrawal by one or more players because of injury. When a player withdraws early in the tournament, his place is filled by the next-highest qualifier. Participants are listed in order of number of appearances and best result. The 2020 edition was cancelled due to the COVID-19 pandemic.

Player	#	Best result	Years Year of best result underlined (Wins in bold)	Qualified but not played	W–L
(United States) Brandon Nakashima	2	**W**	2021, **2022**	–	7–2
(United States) Learner Tien	2	**W**	2024, **2025**	–	7–3
(Australia) Alex de Minaur	2	F	2018, 2019	–	8–2
(Russia) Andrey Rublev	2	F	2017, 2018	–	6–4
(France) Arthur Fils	2	F	2023, 2024	–	5–3
(Switzerland) Dominic Stricker	2	SF	2022(A'), 2023	–	4–4
(France) Luca Van Assche	2	SF	2023, 2024	–	4–4
(United States) Frances Tiafoe	2	SF	2018, 2019	–	3–4
(United States) Alex Michelsen	2	SF	2023, 2024	–	3–4
(United States) Nishesh Basavareddy	2	SF	2024, 2025	–	3–4
(Italy) Lorenzo Musetti	2	RR	2021, 2022	2023	2–4
(South Korea) Chung Hyeon	1	**W**	**2017**	–	5–0
(Greece) Stefanos Tsitsipas	1	**W**	**2018**	2019	5–0
(Italy) Jannik Sinner	1	**W**	**2019** (WC)	2021, 2022	4–1
(Spain) Carlos Alcaraz	1	**W**	**2021**	2022, 2023	5–0
(Serbia) Hamad Medjedovic	1	**W**	**2023**	–	5–0
(Brazil) João Fonseca	1	**W**	**2024**	2025	5–0
(United States) Sebastian Korda	1	F	2021	–	4–1
(Belgium) Alexander Blockx	1	F	2025	–	4–1
(Czech Republic) Jiří Lehečka	1	F	2022	–	3–2
(Russia) Daniil Medvedev	1	3^{rd}	2017(A')	–	2–2
(Croatia) Borna Ćorić	1	4^{th}	2017	–	3–1
(Spain) Jaume Munar	1	4^{th}	2018(A')	–	1–4
(Serbia) Miomir Kecmanović	1	SF	2019(A')	–	2–2
(Argentina) Sebastián Báez	1	SF	2021(A')	–	2–2
(United Kingdom) Jack Draper	1	SF	2022	–	2–2
(Norway) Nicolai Budkov Kjær	1	SF	2025	–	2–2
(Russia) Karen Khachanov	1	RR	2017	–	1–2
(Canada) Denis Shapovalov	1	RR	2017	2018, 2019	1–2
(United States) Jared Donaldson	1	RR	2017	–	0–3
(Italy) Gianluigi Quinzi	1	RR	2017(WC)	–	0–3
(United States) Taylor Fritz	1	RR	2018	–	1–2
(Poland) Hubert Hurkacz	1	RR	2018(A')	–	1–2
(Italy) Liam Caruana	1	RR	2018(WC)	–	0–3
(France) Ugo Humbert	1	RR	2019	–	1–2
(Norway) Casper Ruud	1	RR	2019	–	1–2
(Sweden) Mikael Ymer	1	RR	2019(A')	–	1–2
(Spain) Alejandro Davidovich Fokina	1	RR	2019(A')	–	1–2
(Denmark) Holger Rune	1	RR	2021(A')	2022, 2023	1–2
(Argentina) Juan Manuel Cerúndolo	1	RR	2021	–	0–3
(France) Hugo Gaston	1	RR	2021(A')	–	0–3
(Italy) Francesco Passaro	1	RR	2022(A')	–	1–2
(Chinese Taipei) Tseng Chun-hsin	1	RR	2022	–	0–3
(Italy) Matteo Arnaldi	1	RR	2022(A')	–	0–3
(Italy) Flavio Cobolli	1	RR	2023	–	1–2
(Italy) Luca Nardi	1	RR	2023	–	1–2
(Jordan) Abdullah Shelbayh	1	RR	2023(WC)	–	1–2
(Czech Republic) Jakub Menšík	1	RR	2024	2025	0–3
(China) Shang Juncheng	1	RR	2024	–	0–3
(Spain) Rafael Jódar	1	RR	2025	–	2–1
(Croatia) Dino Prižmić	1	RR	2025	–	1–2
(Spain) Martín Landaluce	1	RR	2025	–	0–3
(Germany) Justin Engel	1	RR	2025	–	0–3
(Germany) Alexander Zverev	0	–	–	2017, 2018	0–0
(Canada) Félix Auger-Aliassime	0	–	–	2019, 2021	0–0
(United States) Jenson Brooksby	0	–	–	2021	0–0
(United States) Ben Shelton	0	–	–	2023	0–0

== Subsequent achievements of Next Gen ATP Finals players ==
Bold: Player won the tournament
Italics: Player qualified that particular year but did not participate.

=== Rankings ===
==== World No. 1s ====
Player	Next Gen appearance	Achieved world No. 1	Ref.
(Russia) Daniil Medvedev	2017	28 February 2022	
(Spain) Carlos Alcaraz	**2021**, 2022, 2023	12 September 2022	
(Italy) Jannik Sinner	**2019**, 2021, 2022	10 June 2024	
(Germany) Alexander Zverev	2017, 2018	2 November 2026	

==== Top Ten ====
Player	Next Gen appearance	Highest ranking	Ref.
(Norway) Casper Ruud	2019	2	
(Greece) Stefanos Tsitsipas	**2018**, 2019	3	
(Denmark) Holger Rune	2021, 2022, 2023	4	
(United States) Taylor Fritz	2018	4	
(United Kingdom) Jack Draper	2022	4	
(United States) Ben Shelton	2023	4	
(Canada) Félix Auger-Aliassime	2019, 2021	4	
(Russia) Andrey Rublev	2017, 2018	5	
(Italy) Lorenzo Musetti	2021, 2022, 2023	5	
(Australia) Alex de Minaur	2018, 2019	5	
(Poland) Hubert Hurkacz	2018	6	
(Italy) Flavio Cobolli	2023	6	
(United States) Frances Tiafoe	2018, 2019	6	
(France) Arthur Fils	2023, 2024	7	
(Russia) Karen Khachanov	2017	8	
(Canada) Denis Shapovalov	2017, 2018, 2019	10	

=== Grand Slam tournaments ===
==== Grand Slam tournament winners ====
Player	Next Gen appearance	Grand Slam tournaments won					Ref.
Player	Next Gen appearance	AU	FR	WB	US	Total	Ref.
(Russia) Daniil Medvedev	2017	—	—	—	2021	**1**	
(Germany) Alexander Zverev	2017, 2018	—	2026	—	2026	**2**	
(Italy) Jannik Sinner	**2019**, 2021, 2022	2024, 2025	—	2025, 2026	2024	**5**	
(Spain) Carlos Alcaraz	**2021**, 2022, 2023	2026	2024, 2025	2023, 2024	2022, 2025	**7**	

==== Grand Slam tournament finalists ====
- Number of titles won are within parentheses

Player	Next Gen appearances	Grand Slam tournament finals					Ref.
Player	Next Gen appearances	AU	FR	WB	US	Total	Ref.
(Russia) Daniil Medvedev	2017	2021, 2022, 2024	—	—	2019, **2021**, 2023	**6** (1)	
(Germany) Alexander Zverev	2017, 2018	2025	2024, **2026**	2020, **2026**			
(United States) Taylor Fritz	2018	—	—	—	2024	**1** (0)	
(Greece) Stefanos Tsitsipas	**2018**, 2019	2023	2021	—	—	**2** (0)	
(Norway) Casper Ruud	2019	—	2022, 2023	—	2022	**3** (0)	
(Italy) Jannik Sinner	**2019**, 2021, 2022	**2024**, **2025**	2025	**2025**	**2024**, 2025	**6** (4)	
(Spain) Carlos Alcaraz	**2021**, 2022, 2023	**2026**	**2024**, **2025**	**2023**, **2024**, 2025	**2022**, **2025**	**8** (7)	
(Italy) Flavio Cobolli	2023	—	2026	—	—	**1** (0)	

=== Olympic medalists ===
Player	Next Gen appearances	Olympic medals				Ref.
Player	Next Gen appearances	Gold	Silver	Bronze	Total	Ref.
(Germany) Alexander Zverev	2017, 2018	**2020**	—	—	**1**	
(Spain) Carlos Alcaraz	**2021**, 2022, 2023	—	2024	—	**1**	
(Italy) Lorenzo Musetti	2021, 2022, 2023	—	—	2024	**1**	

== See also ==
- ATP rankings
- ATP Finals
