= 2021 Next Gen ATP Finals =

- Date: 9–13 November
- Edition: 4th
- Draw: 8S
- Prize money: US$1,300,000
- Surface: Hard (indoor)
- Location: Milan, Italy
- Venue: PalaLido

Champions
- (Spain) Carlos Alcaraz
- Next Gen ATP Finals

The 2021 Next Gen ATP Finals (also known as the Intesa Sanpaolo Next Gen ATP Finals for sponsorship reasons) was a men's exhibition tennis tournament for the best singles players on the 2021 ATP Tour who were age 21 and under. It ran from 9 to 13 November 2021 in Milan, Italy at the PalaLido and was the fourth edition of the event.

Carlos Alcaraz defeated Sebastian Korda in the final, 4–3^{(7–5)}, 4–2, 4–2 to win the title. For the second consecutive edition, the title was won by the youngest player in the draw.

Jannik Sinner was the reigning champion from when the event was last held in 2019, but did not participate this year.

== Qualified players ==
On 14 September 2021, the first four qualifiers were announced: Jannik Sinner, Félix Auger-Aliassime, Sebastian Korda, and Carlos Alcaraz. On 22 October 2021, Jenson Brooksby was announced as the fifth qualifier. Lorenzo Musetti was announced as the sixth qualifier on 24 October 2021. Brandon Nakashima was announced seventh on 30 October 2021. After Auger-Aliassime withdrew from the tournament, the ATP announced Juan Manuel Cerúndolo as the next qualifier on 1 November 2021. Cerúndolo is the first player from South America to qualify in the tournament's history. Brooksby withdrew due to injury on 2 November 2021 and Sebastián Báez qualified later that day. After Sinner's withdrawal, Holger Rune was announced by the ATP as the next qualifier on 4 November 2021. Hugo Gaston was announced as the final qualifier on 5 November 2021.

== Qualification ==
The top eight players in the ATP Race to Milan will qualify. Eligible players have to be 21 or under at the start of the year (born in 2000 or later for the 2021 edition).

Player qualified for the Next Gen ATP Finals
Player withdrew

Race to Milan (1 November 2021)
#	ATP rank	Player	Points	Birth Year	Date Qualified
–	10	Jannik Sinner (ITA)	3,015	2001	14 September
–	11	Félix Auger-Aliassime (CAN)	2,420	2000	14 September
1	32	Carlos Alcaraz (ESP)	1,454	2003	14 September
2	39	Sebastian Korda (USA)	1,195	2000	14 September
–	56	Jenson Brooksby (USA)	1,004	2000	22 October
3	58	Lorenzo Musetti (ITA)	906	2002	24 October
4	63	Brandon Nakashima (USA)	833	2001	30 October
5	91	Juan Manuel Cerúndolo (ARG)	765	2001	1 November
6	111	Sebastián Báez (ARG)	656	2000	2 November
7	109	Holger Rune (DEN)	639	2003	4 November
8	67	Hugo Gaston (FRA)	592	2000	5 November
Alternates
9	164	Jiří Lehečka (CZE)	405	2001	
10	129	Tomáš Macháč (CZE)	314	2000	
11	221	Flavio Cobolli (ITA)	295	2002	

- Qualification will only count events and points played in 2021. A player's year-end position may not coincide with his ATP ranking, which can include "best of" results from 2020.

== Results ==
=== Final ===
- (Spain) Carlos Alcaraz def. (United States) Sebastian Korda, 4–3^{(7–5)}, 4–2, 4–2

== Seeds ==
1. (Spain) Carlos Alcaraz (champion)
2. (United States) Sebastian Korda (final)
3. (Italy) Lorenzo Musetti (round robin)
4. (United States) Brandon Nakashima (semifinals)
5. (Argentina) Juan Manuel Cerúndolo (round robin)
6. (Argentina) Sebastián Báez (semifinals)
7. (Denmark) Holger Rune (round robin)
8. (France) Hugo Gaston (round robin)

== Draw ==
Key

- Q = Qualifier
- WC = Wild card
- LL = Lucky loser
- Alt = Alternate
- ITF = ITF entry
- PR = Protected ranking
- SR = Special ranking
- SE = Special exempt
- JE = Junior exempt
- JR = Junior Accelerator Programme entrant
- CO = College Accelerator Programme entrant
- NG = Next Gen Accelerator Program entrant
- w/o = Walkover
- r = Retired
- d = Defaulted

=== Finals ===
Semifinals
1	(Spain) Carlos Alcaraz	4	4	4
6	(Argentina) Sebastián Báez	2	1	2
2	(United States) Sebastian Korda	4^{7}	2	1	4	4
4	(United States) Brandon Nakashima	3^{3}	4	4	2	2

Final
1	(Spain) Carlos Alcaraz	4^{7}	4	4
2	(United States) Sebastian Korda	3^{5}	2	2

=== Group A ===
		(Spain) Alcaraz	(United States) Nakashima	(Argentina) Cerúndolo	(Denmark) Rune	RR W–L	Set W–L	Game W–L	Standings
1	(Spain) Carlos Alcaraz		4–3^{(7–4)}, 4–1, 4–3^{(7–4)}	4–0, 4–1, 2–4, 4–3^{(7–3)}	4–3^{(8–6)}, 4–2, 4–0	3–0	9–1 (90%)	38–20 (66%)	1
4	(United States) Brandon Nakashima	3–4^{(4–7)}, 1–4, 3–4^{(4–7)}		4–1, 3–4^{(3–7)}, 4–1, 4–0	3–4^{(3–7)}, 4–1, 4–1, 4–3^{(7–1)}	2–1	6–5 (55%)	37–27 (58%)	2
5	(Argentina) Juan Manuel Cerúndolo	0–4, 1–4, 4–2, 3–4^{(3–7)}	1–4, 4–3^{(7–3)}, 1–4, 0–4		1–4, 2–4, 4–1, 1–4	0–3	3–9 (25%)	22–42 (34%)	4
7	(Denmark) Holger Rune	3–4^{(6–8)}, 2–4, 0–4	4–3^{(7–3)}, 1–4, 1–4, 3–4^{(1–7)}	4–1, 4–2, 1–4, 4–1		1–2	4–7 (36%)	27–35 (44%)	3

=== Group B ===
		(United States) Korda	(Italy) Musetti	(Argentina) Báez	(France) Gaston	RR W–L	Set W–L	Game W–L	Standings
2	(United States) Sebastian Korda		4–2, 4–3^{(7–4)}, 4–2	4–3^{(7–3)}, 4–2, 4–2	3–4^{(2–7)}, 3–4^{(6–8)}, 4–0, 4–3^{(7–3)}, 4–0	3–0	9–2 (82%)	42–25 (63%)	1
3	(Italy) Lorenzo Musetti	2–4, 3–4^{(4–7)}, 2–4		1–4, 1–4, 4–3^{(7–5)}, 3–4^{(5–7)}	4–3^{(7–4)}, 4–3^{(8–6)}, 2–4, 3–4^{(7–9)}, 4–2	1–2	4–8 (33%)	33–43 (43%)	3
6	(Argentina) Sebastián Báez	3–4^{(3–7)}, 2–4, 2–4	4–1, 4–1, 3–4^{(5–7)}, 4–3^{(7–5)}		4–3^{(7–2)}, 4–2, 4–2	2–1	6–4 (60%)	34–28 (55%)	2
8	(France) Hugo Gaston	4–3^{(7–2)}, 4–3^{(8–6)}, 0–4, 3–4^{(3–7)}, 0–4	3–4^{(4–7)}, 3–4^{(6–8)}, 4–2, 4–3^{(9–7)}, 2–4	3–4^{(2–7)}, 2–4, 2–4		0–3	4–9 (31%)	34–47 (42%)	4

Standings are determined by: 1. number of wins; 2. number of matches; 3. in two-players-ties, head-to-head records; 4. in three-players-ties, percentage of sets won, then percentage of games won, then head-to-head records; 5. ATP rankings.

== See also ==
- 2021 ATP Tour
