= 2018 Next Gen ATP Finals =

- Date: 6–10 November
- Edition: 2nd
- Draw: 8S
- Prize money: US$1,335,000
- Surface: Hard / indoor
- Location: Milan, Italy

Champions
- (Greece) Stefanos Tsitsipas
- Next Gen ATP Finals

Stefanos Tsitsipas defeated Alex de Minaur in the final, 2–4, 4–1, 4–3^{(7–3)}, 4–3^{(7–3)} to win the 2018 Next Gen ATP tennis finals. Chung Hyeon was the 2017 champion, but was ineligible to compete this year due to his age.

The 2018 Next Gen ATP Finals was a men's exhibition tennis tournament played in Milan, Italy, from 6 to 10 November 2018. It was the season-ending event for the best singles players who were age 21 and under on the 2018 ATP World Tour.

== Prize money ==
Stage	Prize money
Undefeated champion bonus	$24,000
Champion	$235,000
Runner-up	$130,000
Third place	$78,000
Fourth place	$52,000
Each round robin win	$32,000
Participation fee	$52,000
Alternates	$16,000

- Undefeated champion | $407,000

== Qualification ==
The top seven players in the Emirates ATP Race to Milan qualified. The eighth spot went to Italian wild card Liam Caruana, who won a national qualifying tournament. Eligible players had to be 21 or under at the start of the year (born in 1997 or later for 2018 edition). 19-year-old Alex de Minaur was the youngest and only teenage player.

Due to participation in the ATP Finals the following week, Alexander Zverev again withdrew from the tournament because of an injury, as did Denis Shapovalov, citing exhaustion.

Players in gold have qualified.
Players in dark gold qualified, but withdrew.

Race to Milan (29 October 2018)
No.	ATP rank	Player	Points	Tournaments	Birth year
-	5	(Germany) Alexander Zverev	5,085	20	1997
1	16	(Greece) Stefanos Tsitsipas	2,095	30	1998
-	29	(Canada) Denis Shapovalov	1,430	26	1999
2	33	(Australia) Alex de Minaur	1,288	26	1999
3	44	(United States) Frances Tiafoe	1,035	24	1998
4	49	(United States) Taylor Fritz	969	27	1997
5	76	(Russia) Andrey Rublev	715	21	1997
6	80	(Spain) Jaume Munar	697	30	1997
7	79	(Poland) Hubert Hurkacz	650	28	1997
Wild Card
8	622	(Italy) Liam Caruana	45	20	1998
Alternates
9	99	(France) Ugo Humbert	579	27	1998
10	102	(United States) Michael Mmoh	541	27	1998

== Results ==
=== Final ===
- (Greece) Stefanos Tsitsipas def. (Australia) Alex de Minaur, 2–4, 4–1, 4–3^{(7–3)}, 4–3^{(7–3)}

=== Third place match ===
- (Russia) Andrey Rublev def. (Spain) Jaume Munar, 1–4, 4–3^{(7–4)}, 2–4, 4–2, 4–3^{(7–3)}

== Seeds ==
1. (Greece) Stefanos Tsitsipas (champion)
2. (Australia) Alex de Minaur (final)
3. (United States) Frances Tiafoe (round robin)
4. (United States) Taylor Fritz (round robin)
5. (Russia) Andrey Rublev (semifinals, third place)
6. (Poland) Hubert Hurkacz (round robin)
7. (Spain) Jaume Munar (semifinals, fourth place)
8. (Italy) Liam Caruana (round robin)

== Draw ==
Key

- Q = Qualifier
- WC = Wild card
- LL = Lucky loser
- Alt = Alternate
- ITF = ITF entry
- PR = Protected ranking
- SR = Special ranking
- SE = Special exempt
- JE = Junior exempt
- JR = Junior Accelerator Programme entrant
- CO = College Accelerator Programme entrant
- NG = Next Gen Accelerator Program entrant
- w/o = Walkover
- r = Retired
- d = Defaulted

=== Finals ===
Semifinals
1	(Greece) Stefanos Tsitsipas	4^{7}	3^{5}	4	2	4^{7}
5	(Russia) Andrey Rublev	3^{3}	4^{7}	0	4	3^{2}
2	(Australia) Alex de Minaur	3^{5}	4	4	3^{4}	4
7	(Spain) Jaume Munar	4^{7}	1	1	4^{7}	2

Final
1	(Greece) Stefanos Tsitsipas	2	4	4^{7}	4^{7}
2	(Australia) Alex de Minaur	4	1	3^{3}	3^{3}
Third place match
5	(Russia) Andrey Rublev	1	4^{7}	2	4	4^{7}
7	(Spain) Jaume Munar	4	3^{4}	4	2	3^{3}

=== Group A ===
		(Greece) Tsitsipas	(United States) Tiafoe	(Poland) Hurkacz	(Spain) Munar	RR W–L	Set W–L	Game W–L	Standings
1	(Greece) Stefanos Tsitsipas		4–3^{(7–3)}, 4–3^{(7–5)}, 4–2	4–1, 4–3^{(7–2)}, 4–1	4–3^{(7–5)}, 4–3^{(7–3)}, 3–4^{(4–7)}, 4–2	3–0	9–1 (90%)	39–25 (61%)	1
3	(United States) Frances Tiafoe	3–4^{(3–7)}, 3–4 ^{(5–7)}, 2–4		4–1, 4–2, 2–4, 4–3^{(12–10)}	1–4, 3–4 ^{(3–7)}, 1–4	1–2	3–7 (30%)	27–34 (44%)	4
6	(Poland) Hubert Hurkacz	1–4, 3–4^{(2–7)}, 1–4	1–4, 2–4, 4–2, 3–4^{(10–12)}		4–2, 4–2, 2–4, 3–4^{(5–7)}, 4–1	1–2	4–8 (33%)	32–39 (45%)	3
7	(Spain) Jaume Munar	3–4^{(5–7)}, 3–4^{(3–7)}, 4–3^{(7–4)}, 2–4	4–1, 4–3^{(7–3)}, 4–1	2–4, 2–4, 4–2, 4–3^{(7–5)}, 1–4		1–2	6–6 (50%)	37–37 (50%)	2

=== Group B ===
		(Australia) de Minaur	(United States) Fritz	(Russia) Rublev	(Italy) Caruana	RR W–L	Set W–L	Game W–L	Standings
2	(Australia) Alex de Minaur		4–3^{(10–8)}, 4–1, 4–2	4–1, 3–4^{(5–7)}, 4–1, 4–2	4–1, 4–1, 4–2	3–0	9–1 (90%)	39–18 (68%)	1
4	(United States) Taylor Fritz	3–4^{(8–10)}, 1–4, 2–4		2–4, 4–1, 4–3^{(7–4)}, 3–4^{(2–7)}, 2–4	1–4, 4–1, 4–3^{(11–9)}, 4–2	1–2	5–7 (42%)	34–38 (47%)	3
5	(Russia) Andrey Rublev	1–4, 4–3^{(7–5)}, 1–4, 2–4	4–2, 1–4, 3–4^{(4–7)}, 4–3^{(7–2)}, 4–2		4–3^{(9–7)}, 4–1, 4–2	2–1	7–5 (58%)	36–36 (50%)	2
8/WC	(Italy) Liam Caruana	1–4, 1–4, 2–4	4–1, 1–4, 3–4^{(9–11)}, 2–4	3–4^{(7–9)}, 1–4, 2–4		0–3	1–9 (10%)	20–37 (35%)	4

Standings are determined by: 1. number of wins; 2. number of matches; 3. in two-players-ties, head-to-head records; 4. in three-players-ties, percentage of sets won, then percentage of games won, then head-to-head records; 5. ATP rankings.
