= 2022 Next Gen ATP Finals =

- Date: 8–12 November 2022
- Edition: 5th
- Draw: 8S
- Prize money: US$1,400,000
- Surface: Hard (indoor)
- Location: Milan, Italy
- Venue: Allianz Cloud Arena

Champions
- (United States) Brandon Nakashima
- Next Gen ATP Finals

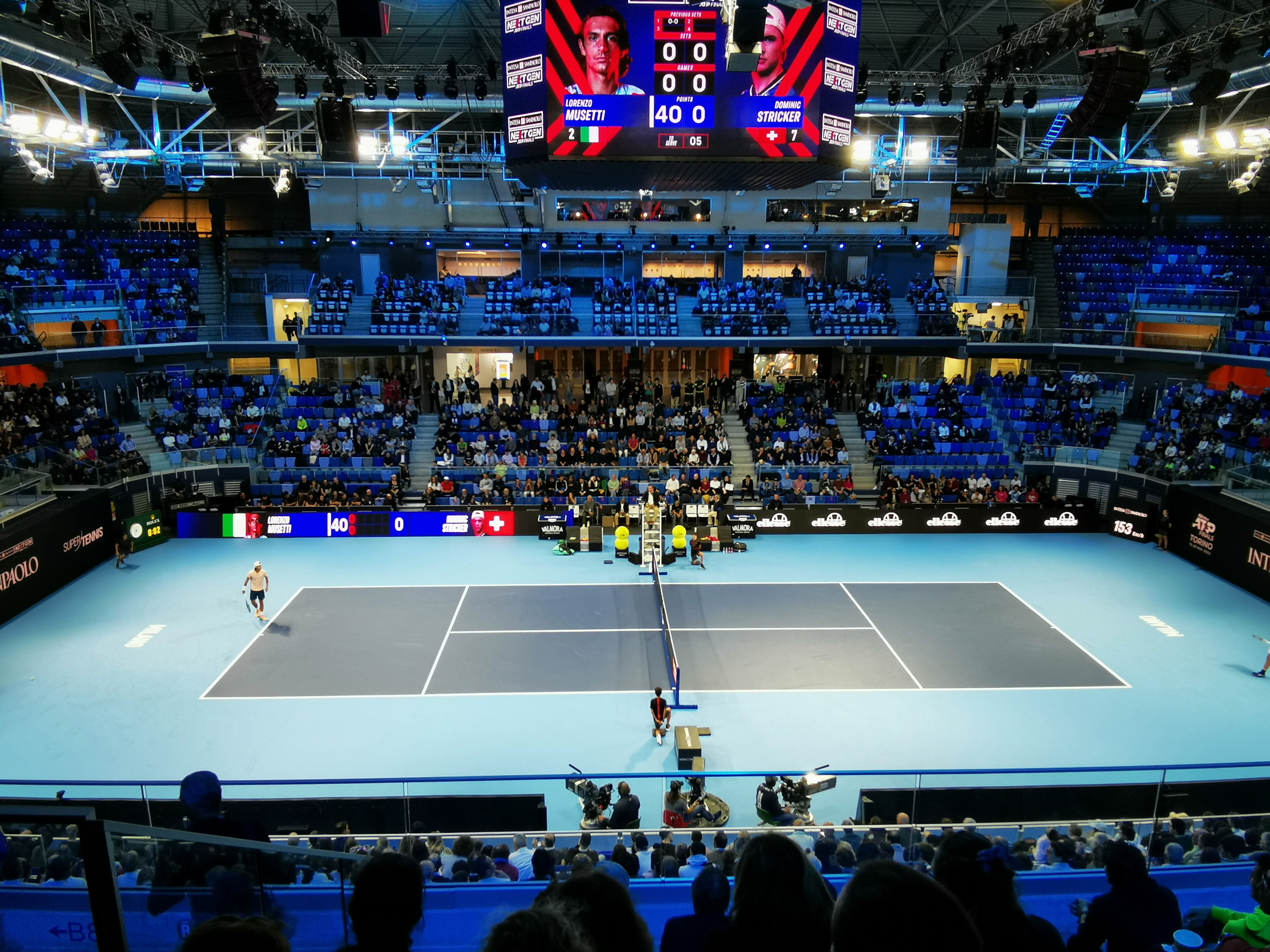
Allianz Cloud Arena

The 2022 Next Gen ATP Finals (also known as the Intesa Sanpaolo Next Gen ATP Finals for sponsorship reasons) was a men's exhibition tennis tournament for the eight highest-ranked singles players on the 2022 ATP Tour who are aged 21 and under. It was held from 8 to 12 November 2022 at the Allianz Cloud Arena in Milan, Italy.

Brandon Nakashima defeated Jiří Lehečka in the final, 4–3^{(7–5)}, 4–3^{(8–6)}, 4–2, to win the title. Nakashima became the first player to win the exhibition on his second appearance.

Carlos Alcaraz was the reigning champion, but withdrew from the event before competition began.

== Qualification ==
The top eight players in the 2022 ATP Race to Milan will qualify. Eligible players must be 21 or under at the end of the calendar year.

Player qualified for the Next Gen ATP Finals
Player qualified for the ATP Finals
Player withdrew

Race to Milan (7 November 2022)
#	ATP rank	Player	Points	Birth Year	Date Qualified
–	1	Carlos Alcaraz (ESP)	6,820	2003	30 September (Note: Alcaraz qualified for the tournament by merit of his points but withdrew before the event after qualifying for the 2022 ATP Finals.)
–	10	Holger Rune (DEN)	2,911	2003	30 September (Note: Rune qualified for the tournament by merit of his points and was the top seed when the groups were formed, but withdrew on 6 November after he was named first alternate at the 2022 ATP Finals.)
–	15	Jannik Sinner (ITA)	2,410	2001	30 September (Note: Sinner qualified for the tournament by merit of his points but withdrew before the event.)
1	23	Lorenzo Musetti (ITA)	1,865	2002	30 September
2	41	Jack Draper (GBR)	1,020	2001	19 October
3	49	Brandon Nakashima (USA)	927	2001	23 October
4	74	Jiří Lehečka (CZE)	715	2001	23 October
5	90	Chun-hsin Tseng (TPE)	611	2001	25 October
6	111	Dominic Stricker (SUI)	497	2002	27 October
7	119	Francesco Passaro (ITA)	473	2001	27 October
8	134	Matteo Arnaldi (ITA)	419	2001	6 November
Alternates
9	126	Luca Nardi (ITA)	452	2003	
10	141	Timofey Skatov (KAZ)	402	2001	

== Results ==
=== Final ===
- (United States) Brandon Nakashima def. (Czech Republic) Jiří Lehečka, 4–3^{(7–5)}, 4–3^{(8–6)}, 4–2

== Seeds ==
1. (Denmark) Holger Rune (withdrew)
2. (Italy) Lorenzo Musetti (round robin)
3. (United Kingdom) Jack Draper (semifinals)
4. (United States) Brandon Nakashima (champion)
5. (Czech Republic) Jiří Lehečka (final)
6. (Chinese Taipei) Tseng Chun-hsin (round robin)
7. (Switzerland) Dominic Stricker (semifinals)
8. (Italy) Francesco Passaro (round robin)
9. (Italy) Matteo Arnaldi (round robin)

== Alternates ==
1. (Italy) Luca Nardi (did not play)
2. (Kazakhstan) Timofey Skatov (did not play)

== Draw ==
Key

- Q = Qualifier
- WC = Wild card
- LL = Lucky loser
- Alt = Alternate
- ITF = ITF entry
- PR = Protected ranking
- SR = Special ranking
- SE = Special exempt
- JE = Junior exempt
- JR = Junior Accelerator Programme entrant
- CO = College Accelerator Programme entrant
- NG = Next Gen Accelerator Program entrant
- w/o = Walkover
- r = Retired
- d = Defaulted

=== Finals ===
Semifinals
4	(United States) Brandon Nakashima	4^{8}	1	4	4^{7}
3	(United Kingdom) Jack Draper	3^{6}	4	2	3^{5}
7	(Switzerland) Dominic Stricker	1	3^{4}	4	1
5	(Czech Republic) Jiří Lehečka	4	4^{7}	2	4

Final
4	(United States) Brandon Nakashima	4^{7}	4^{8}	4
5	(Czech Republic) Jiří Lehečka	3^{5}	3^{6}	2

=== Green Group ===
		(United States) Nakashima	(Czech Republic) Lehečka	(Italy) Passaro	(Italy) Arnaldi	RR; W–L	Set; W–L	Game; W–L	Standings
4	(United States) Brandon Nakashima		4–1, 4–3^{(7–2)}, 4–2	4–3^{(7–4)}, 4–2, 4–1	2–4, 4–3^{(9–7)}, 4–3^{(7–4)}, 3–4^{(4–7)}, 4–2	3–0	9–2 (82%)	41–28 (59%)	1
5	(Czech Republic) Jiří Lehečka	1–4, 3–4^{(2–7)}, 2–4		4–1, 4–3^{(9–7)}, 4–1	4–3^{(7–5)}, 4–1, 4–3^{(7–4)}	2–1	6–3 (67%)	30–24 (56%)	2
8	(Italy) Francesco Passaro	3–4^{(4–7)}, 2–4, 1–4	1–4, 3–4^{(7–9)}, 1–4		4–3^{(9–7)}, 2–4, 3–4^{(4–7)}, 4–3^{(7–4)}, 4–3^{(10–8)}	1–2	3–8 (27%)	28–41 (41%)	3
9	(Italy) Matteo Arnaldi	4–2, 3–4^{(7–9)}, 3–4^{(4–7)}, 4–3^{(7–4)}, 2–4	3–4^{(5–7)}, 1–4, 3–4^{(4–7)}	3–4^{(7–9)}, 4–2, 4–3^{(7–4)}, 3–4^{(4–7)}, 3–4^{(8–10)}		0–3	4–9 (31%)	40–46 (47%)	4

=== Red Group ===
		(Italy) Musetti	(United Kingdom) Draper	(Chinese Taipei) Tseng	(Switzerland) Stricker	RR; W–L	Set; W–L	Game; W–L	Standings
2	(Italy) Lorenzo Musetti		1–4, 0–4, 3–4^{(3–7)}	4–2, 4–2, 4–2	3–4^{(5–7)}, 3–4^{(6–8)}, 4–3^{(9–7)}, 4–3^{(8–6)}, 3–4^{(3–7)}	1–2	5–6 (45%)	33–36 (48%)	3
3	(United Kingdom) Jack Draper	4–1, 4–0, 4–3^{(7–3)}		1–4, 4–2, 4–3^{(7–2)}, 4–2	3–4^{(5–7)}, 3–4^{(5–7)}, 3–4^{(5–7)}	2–1	6–4 (60%)	34–27 (56%)	2
6	(Chinese Taipei) Tseng Chun-hsin	2–4, 2–4, 2–4	4–1, 2–4, 3–4^{(2–7)}, 2–4		2–4, 1–4, 2–4	0–3	1–9 (10%)	22–37 (37%)	4
7	(Switzerland) Dominic Stricker	4–3^{(7–5)}, 4–3^{(8–6)}, 3–4^{(7–9)}, 3–4^{(6–8)}, 4–3^{(7–3)}	4–3^{(7–5)}, 4–3^{(7–5)}, 4–3^{(7–5)}	4–2, 4–1, 4–2		3–0	9–2 (82%)	42–31 (58%)	1

Standings are determined by: 1. number of wins; 2. number of matches; 3. in two-players-ties, head-to-head records; 4. in three-players-ties, percentage of sets won, then percentage of games won, then head-to-head records; 5. ATP rankings.

== See also ==
- 2022 ATP Tour
- 2022 ATP Finals
