= 2023 Next Gen ATP Finals =

- Date: 28 November – 2 December 2023
- Edition: 6th
- Draw: 8S
- Prize money: US$2,000,000
- Surface: Hard (indoor)
- Location: Jeddah, Saudi Arabia
- Venue: King Abdullah Sports City

Champions
- (Serbia) Hamad Medjedovic
- Next Gen ATP Finals

The 2023 Next Gen ATP Finals was a men's exhibition tennis tournament for the eight highest-ranked singles players on the 2023 ATP Tour who are aged 21 and under. It was held from 28 November to 2 December 2023 at King Abdullah Sports City in Jeddah, Saudi Arabia.

Hamad Medjedovic defeated Arthur Fils, 3–4^{(6–8)}, 4–1, 4–2, 3–4^{(9–11)}, 4–1 to win the title.

Brandon Nakashima was the reigning champion but was ineligible to defend his title due to his age.

== Race to qualification ==
The top seven players in the 2023 ATP Race to Jeddah will qualify plus a wildcard entry. Eligible players must be 21 or under at the end of the calendar year (i.e. born 2002 or later).

Player qualified for the Next Gen ATP Finals
Player qualified for the ATP Finals
Player withdrew

Race to Jeddah (20 November 2023)
#	ATP rank	Player	Points	Birth year	Date qualified
–	2	Carlos Alcaraz (ESP)	8,855	2003	
–	8	Holger Rune (DEN)	3,660	2003	
–	17	Ben Shelton (USA)	2,145	2002	
–	27	Lorenzo Musetti (ITA)	1,470	2002	
1	36	Arthur Fils (FRA)	1,158	2004	8 November
2	66	Luca Van Assche (FRA)	687	2004	8 November
3	92	Dominic Stricker (SUI)	673	2002	8 November
4	94	Alex Michelsen (USA)	653	2004	20 November
5	100	Flavio Cobolli (ITA)	640	2002	8 November
6	111	Hamad Medjedovic (SRB)	582	2003	20 November
7	118	Luca Nardi (ITA)	533	2003	20 November
Wildcard
8	187	Abdullah Shelbayh (JOR)	311	2003	8 November
Alternates
9	127	Luciano Darderi (ITA)	510	2002	
10	128	Arthur Cazaux (FRA)	508	2002	

== Results ==
=== Final ===
- (Serbia) Hamad Medjedovic def. (France) Arthur Fils, 3–4^{(6–8)}, 4–1, 4–2, 3–4^{(9–11)}, 4–1

== Seeds ==
1. (France) Arthur Fils (final)
2. (France) Luca Van Assche (semifinals)
3. (Switzerland) Dominic Stricker (semifinals, retired)
4. (United States) Alex Michelsen (round robin)
5. (Italy) Flavio Cobolli (round robin)
6. (Serbia) Hamad Medjedovic (champion)
7. (Italy) Luca Nardi (round robin)
8. (Jordan) Abdullah Shelbayh (round robin)

== Alternates ==
1. (Italy) Luciano Darderi (did not play)
2. (France) Arthur Cazaux (did not play)

== Draw ==
Key

- Q = Qualifier
- WC = Wild card
- LL = Lucky loser
- Alt = Alternate
- ITF = ITF entry
- PR = Protected ranking
- SR = Special ranking
- SE = Special exempt
- JE = Junior exempt
- JR = Junior Accelerator Programme entrant
- CO = College Accelerator Programme entrant
- NG = Next Gen Accelerator Program entrant
- w/o = Walkover
- r = Retired
- d = Defaulted

=== Finals ===
Semifinals
1	(France) Arthur Fils	2	4	4^{7}	4^{8}
2	(France) Luca Van Assche	4	1	3^{1}	3^{6}
6	(Serbia) Hamad Medjedovic	4^{7}	2
3	(Switzerland) Dominic Stricker	3^{5}	1^{r}

Final
1	(France) Arthur Fils	4^{8}	1	2	4^{11}	1
6	(Serbia) Hamad Medjedovic	3^{6}	4	4	3^{9}	4

=== Green Group ===
		(France) Fils	(Switzerland) Stricker	(Italy) Cobolli	(Italy) Nardi	RR; W–L	Set; W–L	Game; W–L	Standings
1	(France) Arthur Fils		4–2, 3–4^{(3–7)}, 4–2, 4–3^{(7–5)}	4–1, 4–2, 4–2	2–4, 4–3^{(8–6)}, 4–2, 1–4, 4–2	3–0	9–3 (75%)	42–31 (58%)	1
3	(Switzerland) Dominic Stricker	2–4, 4–3^{(7–3)}, 2–4, 3–4^{(5–7)}		2–4, 4–3^{(9–7)}, 1–4, 2–4	4–1, 4–1, 4–2	1–2	5–6 (45%)	32–34 (48%)	2
5	(Italy) Flavio Cobolli	1–4, 2–4, 2–4	4–2, 3–4^{(7–9)}, 4–1, 4–2		4–3^{(7–4)}, 2–4, 3–4^{(1–7)}, 4–1, 3–4^{(3–7)}	1–2	5–7 (42%)	36–37 (49%)	3
7	(Italy) Luca Nardi	4–2, 3–4^{(6–8)}, 2–4, 4–1, 2–4	1–4, 1–4, 2–4	3–4^{(4–7)}, 4–2, 4–3^{(7–1)}, 1–4, 4–3^{(7–3)}		1–2	5–8 (38%)	35–43 (45%)	4

=== Red Group ===
		(France) Van Assche	(United States) Michelsen	(Serbia) Medjedovic	(Jordan) Shelbayh	RR; W–L	Set; W–L	Game; W–L	Standings
2	(France) Luca Van Assche		4–3^{(7–0)}, 3–4^{(4–7)}, 3–4^{(4–7)}, 4–1, 4–3^{(8–6)}	2–4, 4–2, 3–4^{(7–9)}, 1–4	4–3^{(7–5)}, 3–4^{(5–7)}, 4–1, 4–1	2–1	7–6 (54%)	43–38 (53%)	2
4	(United States) Alex Michelsen	3–4^{(0–7)}, 4–3^{(7–4)}, 4–3^{(7–4)}, 1–4, 3–4^{(6–8)}		2–4, 3–4^{(3–7)}, 4–3^{(7–3)}, 4–3^{(7–5)}, 3–4^{(4–7)}	2–4, 4–1, 0–4, 0–4	0–3	5–9 (36%)	37–49 (43%)	4
6	(Serbia) Hamad Medjedovic	4–2, 2–4, 4–3^{(9–7)}, 4–1	4–2, 4–3^{(7–3)}, 3–4^{(3–7)}, 3–4^{(5–7)}, 4–3^{(7–4)}		3–4^{(6–8)}, 4–2, 4–3^{(7–5)}, 4–2	3–0	9–4 (69%)	47–37 (56%)	1
8/WC	(Jordan) Abdullah Shelbayh	3–4^{(5–7)}, 4–3^{(7–5)}, 1–4, 1–4	4–2, 1–4, 4–0, 4–0	4–3^{(8–6)}, 2–4, 3–4^{(5–7)}, 2–4		1–2	5–7 (42%)	33–36 (48%)	3

Standings are determined by: 1. number of wins; 2. number of matches; 3. in two-players-ties, head-to-head records; 4. in three-players-ties, percentage of sets won, then percentage of games won, then head-to-head records; 5. ATP rankings.

== See also ==
- 2023 ATP Tour
- 2023 ATP Finals
