= 2025 Next Gen ATP Finals =

- Date: 17–21 December 2025
- Edition: 8th
- Draw: 8S
- Prize money: US$2,101,250
- Surface: Hard (indoor)
- Location: Jeddah, Saudi Arabia
- Venue: King Abdullah Sports City

Champions
- (United States) Learner Tien
- Next Gen ATP Finals

The 2025 Next Gen ATP Finals was a men's exhibition tennis tournament for the eight highest-ranked singles players on the 2025 ATP Tour who are aged 20 and under. It was held from 17 December to 21 December 2025 at King Abdullah Sports City in Jeddah, Saudi Arabia.

Learner Tien defeated Alexander Blockx, 4–3^{(7–4)}, 4–2, 4–1 to win the title. The American improved his result after a runner-up in the previous edition.

João Fonseca was the reigning champion and was eligible to defend his title, but withdrew due to an injury.

== Race to qualification ==
The top eight players in the 2025 ATP Race to Jeddah qualified. Eligible players must be 20 or under at the end of the calendar year (i.e. born 2005 or later). The cutoff date for the ATP Live Race to Jeddah was 10 November 2025.

Player qualified for the Next Gen ATP Finals.
Player withdrew.

ATP Race to Jeddah as of 24 November 2025
Seed	ATP rank	Player	Points	Birth year	Official Date qualified
–	19	Jakub Menšík (CZE)	2,180	2005	–
–	24	João Fonseca (BRA)	1,635	2006	–
1	28	Learner Tien (USA)	1,550	2005	26 November
2	115	Alexander Blockx (BEL)	542	2005	27 November
3	127	Dino Prižmić (CRO)	487	2005	27 November
4	135	Martín Landaluce (ESP)	455	2006	28 November
5	133	Nicolai Budkov Kjær (NOR)	450	2006	28 November
6	166	Nishesh Basavareddy (USA)	349	2005	29 November
7	167	Rafael Jódar (ESP)	349	2006	29 November
8	182	Justin Engel (GER)	316	2007	10 December
Alternates (as of 10 November 2025)
9	201	Gilles-Arnaud Bailly (BEL)	285	2005	10 November
–	209	Rodrigo Pacheco Méndez (MEX)	247	2005	10 November
10	228	Juan Carlos Prado Ángelo (BOL)	242	2005	17 December

== Results ==
=== Final ===
- (United States) Learner Tien def. (Belgium) Alexander Blockx, 4–3^{(7–4)}, 4–2, 4–1.

== Seeds ==
1. (United States) Learner Tien (champion)
2. (Belgium) Alexander Blockx (final)
3. (Croatia) Dino Prižmić (round robin)
4. (Spain) Martín Landaluce (round robin)
5. (Norway) Nicolai Budkov Kjær (semifinals)
6. (United States) Nishesh Basavareddy (semifinals)
7. (Spain) Rafael Jódar (round robin)
8. (Germany) Justin Engel (round robin)

== Alternates ==
1. (Belgium) Gilles-Arnaud Bailly (did not play)
2. (Bolivia) Juan Carlos Prado Ángelo (did not play)

== Draw ==
Key

- Q = Qualifier
- WC = Wild card
- LL = Lucky loser
- Alt = Alternate
- ITF = ITF entry
- PR = Protected ranking
- SR = Special ranking
- SE = Special exempt
- JE = Junior exempt
- JR = Junior Accelerator Programme entrant
- CO = College Accelerator Programme entrant
- NG = Next Gen Accelerator Program entrant
- w/o = Walkover
- r = Retired
- d = Defaulted

=== Finals ===
Semifinals
1	(United States) Learner Tien	4	4	4^{7}
6	(United States) Nishesh Basavareddy	2	1	3^{3}
2	(Belgium) Alexander Blockx	4^{7}	4^{10}	4
5	(Norway) Nicolai Budkov Kjær	3^{4}	3^{8}	2

Final
1	(United States) Learner Tien	4^{7}	4	4
2	(Belgium) Alexander Blockx	3^{4}	2	1

=== Blue Group ===
		(United States) Tien	(Spain) Landaluce	(Norway) Budkov Kjær	(Spain) Jódar	RR; W–L	Set; W–L	Game; W–L	Standings
1	(United States) Learner Tien		1–4, 4–1, 4–3^{(7–4)}, 4–3^{(7–2)}	3–4^{(2–7)}, 4–1, 4–2, 4–2	4–1, 3–4^{(3–7)}, 4–1, 2–4, 3–4^{(4–7)}	2–1	8–5 (62%)	44–34 (56%)	1
4	(Spain) Martín Landaluce	4–1, 1–4, 3–4^{(4–7)}, 3–4^{(2–7)}		1–4, 4–3^{(9–7)}, 2–4, 3–4^{(4–7)}	3–4^{(7–9)}, 1–4, 3–4^{(2–7)}	0–3	2–9 (18%)	28–40 (41%)	4
5	(Norway) Nicolai Budkov Kjær	4–3^{(7–2)}, 1–4, 2–4, 2–4	4–1, 3–4^{(7–9)}, 4–2, 4–3^{(7–4)}		4–1, 4–2, 1–4, 4–2	2–1	7–5 (58%)	37–34 (52%)	2
7	(Spain) Rafael Jódar	1–4, 4–3^{(7–3)}, 1–4, 4–2, 4–3^{(7–4)}	4–3^{(9–7)}, 4–1, 4–3^{(7–2)}	1–4, 2–4, 4–1, 2–4		2–1	7–5 (58%)	35–36 (49%)	3

=== Red Group ===
		(Belgium) Blockx	(Croatia) Prižmić	(United States) Basavareddy	(Germany) Engel	RR; W–L	Set; W–L	Game; W–L	Standings
2	(Belgium) Alexander Blockx		4–3^{(7–4)}, 2–4, 4–2, 4–0	4–3^{(7–2)}, 4–3^{(10–8)}, 4–1	3–4^{(7–9)}, 4–2, 4–2, 4–2	3–0	9–2 (82%)	41–26 (61%)	1
3	(Croatia) Dino Prižmić	3–4^{(4–7)}, 4–2, 2–4, 0–4		2–4, 3–4^{(7–9)}, 4–3^{(7–3)}, 2–4	4–1, 2–4, 4–3^{(7–3)}, 4–1	1–2	5–7 (42%)	34–38 (47%)	3
6	(United States) Nishesh Basavareddy	3–4^{(2–7)}, 3–4^{(8–10)}, 1–4	4–2, 4–3^{(9–7)}, 3–4^{(3–7)}, 4–2		4–3^{(7–3)}, 4–2, 4–3^{(7–5)}	2–1	6–4 (60%)	34–31 (52%)	2
8	(Germany) Justin Engel	4–3^{(9–7)}, 2–4, 2–4, 2–4	1–4, 4–2, 3–4^{(3–7)}, 1–4	3–4^{(3–7)}, 2–4, 3–4^{(5–7)}		0–3	2–9 (18%)	27–41 (40%)	4

Standings are determined by: 1. number of wins; 2. number of matches; 3. in two-player-ties, head-to-head records; 4. in three-player-ties, percentage of sets won, then percentage of games won, then head-to-head records; 5. ATP rankings.

== See also ==
- 2025 ATP Tour
- 2025 ATP Finals
