= 2026 Next Gen ATP Finals =

- Date: 9–13 December 2026
- Edition: 9th
- Draw: 8S
- Prize money: US$2,000,000
- Surface: Hard (indoor)
- Location: Reggio Calabria, Italy
- Venue: PalaCalafiore
- Next Gen ATP Finals

The 2026 Next Gen ATP Finals is a men's exhibition tennis tournament for the eight highest-ranked singles players on the 2026 ATP Tour who are aged 20 and under. It will be held from December 9 till December 13 at PalaCalafiore in Reggio Calabria, Italy.

Learner Tien was the reigning champion but was ineligible to defend his title due to his age.

== Race to qualification ==
The top eight players in the 2026 ATP Race to Reggio Calabria qualify. Eligible players must be 20 or under at the end of the calendar year (i.e. born 2006 or later). The ATP Live Race to Reggio Calabria ended on 15 November 2026.

Player qualified for the Next Gen ATP Finals
Player qualified for the ATP Finals
Player withdrew

ATP Race to Reggio Calabria as of 16 November 2026
Seed	ATP rank	Player	Points	Birth year	Official Date qualified
–	10	Rafael Jódar (ESP)	3,234	2006	
–	46	João Fonseca (BRA)	1,200	2006	
1	71	Martín Landaluce (ESP)	822	2006	21 November
2	134	Moïse Kouamé (FRA)	423	2009	21 November
3	136	Rei Sakamoto (JPN)	420	2006	20 November
4	139	Federico Cinà (ITA)	415	2007	20 November
5	151	Darwin Blanch (USA)	380	2007	20 November
6	161	Jan Kumstát (CZE)	341	2007	20 November
7	169	Joel Schwärzler (AUT)	334	2006	20 November
Wild Card
8	500	Pierluigi Basile (ITA)	84	2007	20 November
Alternates
9	173	Felix Balshaw (FRA)	322	2006	
10	176	Nicolai Budkov Kjær (NOR)	321	2006	
11	185	Diego Dedura (GER)	298	2008	

== Draw ==
Key

- Q = Qualifier
- WC = Wild card
- LL = Lucky loser
- Alt = Alternate
- ITF = ITF entry
- PR = Protected ranking
- SR = Special ranking
- SE = Special exempt
- JE = Junior exempt
- JR = Junior Accelerator Programme entrant
- CO = College Accelerator Programme entrant
- NG = Next Gen Accelerator Program entrant
- w/o = Walkover
- r = Retired
- d = Defaulted

=== Finals ===
Semifinals

Final

=== Group A ===
RR; W–L	Set; W–L	Game; W–L	Standings

=== Group B ===
RR; W–L	Set; W–L	Game; W–L	Standings

Standings are determined by: 1. number of wins; 2. number of matches; 3. in two-player-ties, head-to-head records; 4. in three-player-ties, percentage of sets won, then percentage of games won, then head-to-head records; 5. ATP rankings.

== See also ==
- 2026 ATP Tour
- 2026 ATP Finals
