= 2020 Next Gen ATP Finals =

- Date: ~~10-14 November~~
- Edition: ~~4th~~
- Draw: ~~8S~~
- Prize money: ~~$1,400,000~~
- Surface: ~~Hard / indoor~~
- Location: ~~Milan, Italy~~
- Next Gen ATP Finals

The 2020 Next Gen ATP Finals would have been a men's exhibition tennis tournament that was scheduled to be held in Milan, Italy, from 10 to 14 November 2020. It would have been the 4th edition of the event. However, the tournament was cancelled by the Association of Tennis Professionals (ATP) due to the COVID-19 pandemic, on 14 August 2020.

== Qualification ==
The top seven players in the ATP Race to Milan would have qualified, with the eighth spot reserved for an Italian wild card, as in the past three editions. Eligible players had to be 21 or under at the start of the year (born in 1999 or later for the 2020 edition).

On 16 March 2020, the ATP rankings were frozen due to the COVID-19 pandemic. As a result of the pandemic, the ATP changed its ranking system for 2020. The ATP rankings would have been used to determine qualification.

Players in gold would have qualified for the Next Gen ATP Finals.

Race to Milan (2 November 2020)
#	ATP rank	Player	Points	Birth Year
1	12	Denis Shapovalov (CAN)	2,830	1999
2	21	Félix Auger-Aliassime (CAN)	2,171	2000
3	25	Alex de Minaur (AUS)	1,815	1999
4	42	Miomir Kecmanović (SRB)	1,283	1999
5	44	Jannik Sinner (ITA)	1,214	2001
6	63	Alejandro Davidovich Fokina (ESP)	963	1999
7	75	Corentin Moutet (FRA)	838	1999
Wild Card
8	124	Lorenzo Musetti (ITA)	507	2002
Alternates
9	84	Emil Ruusuvuori (FIN)	791	1999
10	110	Alexei Popyrin (AUS)	613	1999

== See also ==
- 2020 ATP Tour
