= 2019 Next Gen ATP Finals =

- Date: 5–9 November
- Edition: 3rd
- Draw: 8S
- Prize money: US$1,400,000
- Surface: Hard / indoor
- Location: Milan, Italy

Champions
- (Italy) Jannik Sinner
- Next Gen ATP Finals

Jannik Sinner defeated Alex de Minaur in the final, 4–2, 4–1, 4–2 to win the 2019 Next Gen ATP Finals.

Stefanos Tsitsipas was the defending champion, but withdrew as he had qualified for the ATP Finals.

The 2019 edition was a men's exhibition tennis tournament played in Milan, Italy, from 5 to 9 November 2019. It was the season-ending event for the best singles players that were age 21 and under on the 2019 ATP Tour. This was the first year that it was played at the PalaLido Allianz Cloud, after two years at Fiera Milano.

== Prize money ==
Stage	Prize money
Undefeated champion bonus	$24,000
Champion	$250,000
Runner-up	$140,000
Semi-finalist	$63,000
Each round robin win	$33,000
Participation fee	$56,000
Alternates	$16,000

- Undefeated champion | $429,000

== Qualified players ==
In September, during the US Open, defending champion Stefanos Tsitsipas became the first player to qualify. In October, he announced his withdrawal, having qualified for the 2019 ATP Finals.

On 16 September, Jannik Sinner was announced as the Italian wild card. As of the October 28 deadline, Sinner reached the ranking of 8th player born in 1998 or later.

On 9 October, Félix Auger-Aliassime became the second player to qualify.

On 16 October, Alex de Minaur qualified for the second consecutive year, having been the runner-up in 2018.

Between 21 and 23 of October, Frances Tiafoe, Casper Ruud, Miomir Kecmanović and Ugo Humbert all qualified. Mikael Ymer then qualified the following day after Félix Auger-Aliassime withdrew due to injury. Denis Shapovalov also withdrew on 1 November, which meant Alejandro Davidovich Fokina qualified.

== Qualification ==
The top seven players in the ATP Race to Milan qualified. The eighth spot was reserved for an Italian wild card, as in the past two editions. Eligible players had to be 21 or under at the start of the year (born in 1998 or later for 2019 edition).

Players in gold have qualified.
Players in dark gold qualified, but withdrew.

Race to Milan (28 October 2019)
#	ATP rank	Player	Points	Tours	Birth Year
–	7	Stefanos Tsitsipas (GRE)	3910	25	1998
1	18	Alex de Minaur (AUS)	1730	23	1999
–	19	Félix Auger-Aliassime (CAN)	1681	25	2000
–	28	Denis Shapovalov (CAN)	1495	25	1999
2	46	Frances Tiafoe (USA)	1060	26	1998
3	56	Ugo Humbert (FRA)	932	29	1998
4	63	Casper Ruud (NOR)	931	23	1998
5	55	Miomir Kecmanović (SRB)	901	25	1999
6	73	Mikael Ymer (SWE)	763	20	1998
7	82	Alejandro Davidovich Fokina (ESP)	627	23	1999
Wild Card
8	93	Jannik Sinner (ITA)	596	24	2001
Alternates
9	95	Alexei Popyrin (AUS)	585	24	1999
10	97	Corentin Moutet (FRA)	584	25	1999
11	393	Giulio Zeppieri (ITA)	93	17	2001

== Results ==
=== Final ===
- (Italy) Jannik Sinner def. (Australia) Alex de Minaur, 4–2, 4–1, 4–2

== Seeds ==
1. (Australia) Alex de Minaur (runner-up)
2. (United States) Frances Tiafoe (semifinals)
3. (France) Ugo Humbert (round robin)
4. (Norway) Casper Ruud (round robin)
5. (Serbia) Miomir Kecmanović (semifinals)
6. (Sweden) Mikael Ymer (round robin)
7. (Spain) Alejandro Davidovich Fokina (round robin)
8. (Italy) Jannik Sinner (champion)

== Draw ==
Key

- Q = Qualifier
- WC = Wild card
- LL = Lucky loser
- Alt = Alternate
- ITF = ITF entry
- PR = Protected ranking
- SR = Special ranking
- SE = Special exempt
- JE = Junior exempt
- JR = Junior Accelerator Programme entrant
- CO = College Accelerator Programme entrant
- NG = Next Gen Accelerator Program entrant
- w/o = Walkover
- r = Retired
- d = Defaulted

=== Finals ===
Semifinals
1	(Australia) Alex de Minaur	4	4	0	4
2	(United States) Frances Tiafoe	2	1	4	2
8/WC	(Italy) Jannik Sinner	2	4	4	4
5	(Serbia) Miomir Kecmanović	4	1	2	2

Final
1	(Australia) Alex de Minaur	2	1	2
8/WC	(Italy) Jannik Sinner	4	4	4

=== Group A ===
		(Australia) de Minaur	(Norway) Ruud	(Serbia) Kecmanović	(Spain) Davidovich Fokina	RR W–L	Set W–L	Game W–L	Standings
1	(Australia) Alex de Minaur		4–1, 4–0, 4–2	4–1, 4–3^{(7–4)}, 1–4, 4–0	4–2, 3–4^{(5–7)}, 4–1, 4–1	3–0	9–2 (81%)	40–19 (67%)	1
4	(Norway) Casper Ruud	1–4, 0–4, 2–4		3–4^{(5–7)}, 3–4^{(5–7)}, 2–4	3–4^{(2–7)}, 4–3^{(7–2)}, 4–2, 3–4^{(2–7)}, 4–1	1–2	3–8 (27%)	29–38 (43%)	3
5	(Serbia) Miomir Kecmanović	1–4, 3–4^{(4–7)}, 4–1, 0–4	4–3^{(7–5)}, 4–3^{(7–5)}, 4–2		4–1, 4–1, 4–3^{(8–6)}	2–1	7–3 (57%)	32–26 (55%)	2
7	(Spain) Alejandro Davidovich Fokina	2–4, 4–3^{(7–5)}, 1–4, 1–4	4–3^{(7–2)}, 3–4^{(2–7)}, 2–4, 4–3^{(7–2)}, 1–4	1–4, 1–4, 3–4^{(6–8)}		0–3	3–9 (25%)	27–45 (38%)	4

=== Group B ===
		(United States) Tiafoe	(France) Humbert	(Sweden) Ymer	(Italy) Sinner	RR W–L	Set W–L	Game W–L	Standings
2	(United States) Frances Tiafoe		4–2, 4–3^{(7–5)}, 3–4^{(4–7)}, 4–1	4–2, 4–2, 4–2	4–3^{(7–4)}, 2–4, 2–4, 2–4	2–1	7–4 (64%)	37–31 (54%)	2
3	(France) Ugo Humbert	2–4, 3–4^{(5–7)}, 4–3^{(7–4)}, 1–4		3–4^{(2–7)}, 4–1, 2–4, 1–4	4–3^{(7–5)}, 3–4^{(3–7)}, 4–2, 4–2	1–2	5–7 (42%)	35–39 (47%)	4
6	(Sweden) Mikael Ymer	2–4, 2–4, 2–4	4–3^{(7–2)}, 1–4, 4–2, 4–1		0–4, 2–4, 1–4	1–2	3–7 (30%)	22–34 (39%)	3
8/WC	(Italy) Jannik Sinner	3–4^{(4–7)}, 4–2, 4–2, 4–2	3–4^{(5–7)}, 4–3^{(7–3)}, 2–4, 2–4	4–0, 4–2, 4–1		2–1	7–4 (64%)	38–28 (58%)	1

Standings are determined by: 1. number of wins; 2. number of matches; 3. in two-players-ties, head-to-head records; 4. in three-players-ties, percentage of sets won, then percentage of games won, then head-to-head records; 5. ATP rankings.
