= 2017 Next Gen ATP Finals =

- Date: 7–11 November
- Edition: 1st
- Category: Exhibition
- Draw: 8S
- Prize money: US$1,275,000
- Surface: Hard / indoor
- Location: Milan, Italy

Champions
- (South Korea) Chung Hyeon
- Next Gen ATP Finals

The 2017 Next Gen ATP Finals was a men's exhibition tennis tournament played in Milan, Italy, from 7 to 11 November 2017. It was the season-ending event for the best singles players who were age 21 and under on the 2017 ATP World Tour.

Chung Hyeon defeated Andrey Rublev in the final, 3–4^{(5–7)}, 4–3^{(7–2)}, 4–2, 4–2 to capture the 2017 Next Gen ATP Finals title.

== Rules ==
A number of innovative rule changes were introduced in 2017 including best of five sets, first to four games in each set, tie break at 3-All, no-ad scoring (server’s choice) and no lets. There were amended rules regarding time, the match started five minutes from entry of second player onto court, a shot clock to ensure 25 second rule, a maximum of one medical timeout per player per match, limits on when coaches can talk to players and the public was allowed to move around during a match (except at baselines).

In September 2017, the ATP announced that there would be no line judges at the event. The only official on court was the umpire and all line calls were made by Hawk-Eye. All calls were therefore final; however, foot faults, which are usually called by the baseline official, could be challenged and would be reviewed by a camera monitoring the server's feet.

== Qualification ==
The top seven players in the Emirates ATP Race to Milan qualified. The eighth spot was reserved for an Italian wild card, determined at a qualifying tournament. Eligible players must be 21 or under at the start of the year (born in 1996 or later for 2017 edition). 18-year-old Denis Shapovalov was the youngest and only teenage player.

Alexander Zverev withdrew from the tournament, as he would play the ATP Finals the following week.

Players in gold have qualified.
Players in dark gold qualified, but withdrew.

Race to Milan (30 October 2017)
No.	ATP rank	Player	Points	Move	Tournaments	Birth year
-	4	Alexander Zverev (GER)	4,490	Steady	23	1997
1	35	Andrey Rublev (RUS)	1,219	Steady	21	1997
2	44	Karen Khachanov (RUS)	1,045	Steady	27	1996
3	49	Denis Shapovalov (CAN)	971	Steady	22	1999
4	51	Borna Ćorić (CRO)	931	▲1	27	1996
5	54	Jared Donaldson (USA)	890	▼1	27	1996
6	55	Chung Hyeon (KOR)	805	▲1	20	1996
7	63	Daniil Medvedev (RUS)	772	▼1	25	1996
Wild Card
56	294	Gianluigi Quinzi (ITA)	138	▼1	11	1996
Alternates
8	78	Frances Tiafoe (USA)	662	Steady	25	1998
9	89	Stefanos Tsitsipas (GRE)	606	Steady	30	1998

== Results ==
=== Final ===
- (South Korea) Chung Hyeon def. (Russia) Andrey Rublev, 3–4^{(5–7)}, 4–3^{(7–2)}, 4–2, 4–2

=== Third place match ===
- (Russia) Daniil Medvedev def. (Croatia) Borna Ćorić, walkover

== Seeds ==
1. (Russia) Andrey Rublev (final)
2. (Russia) Karen Khachanov (round robin)
3. (Canada) Denis Shapovalov (round robin)
4. (Croatia) Borna Ćorić (semifinals, fourth place)
5. (United States) Jared Donaldson (round robin)
6. (South Korea) Chung Hyeon (champion)
7. (Russia) Daniil Medvedev (semifinals, third place)
8. (Italy) Gianluigi Quinzi (round robin)

== Draw ==
Key

- Q = Qualifier
- WC = Wild card
- LL = Lucky loser
- Alt = Alternate
- ITF = ITF entry
- PR = Protected ranking
- SR = Special ranking
- SE = Special exempt
- JE = Junior exempt
- JR = Junior Accelerator Programme entrant
- CO = College Accelerator Programme entrant
- NG = Next Gen Accelerator Program entrant
- w/o = Walkover
- r = Retired
- d = Defaulted

=== Finals ===
Semifinals
6	(South Korea) Chung Hyeon	4	4	3^{4}	1	4
7	(Russia) Daniil Medvedev	1	1	4^{7}	4	0
4	(Croatia) Borna Ćorić	1	3^{6}	1
1	(Russia) Andrey Rublev	4	4^{8}	4

Final
6	(South Korea) Chung Hyeon	3^{5}	4^{7}	4	4
1	(Russia) Andrey Rublev	4^{7}	3^{2}	2	2
Third place match
7	(Russia) Daniil Medvedev	w/o
4	(Croatia) Borna Ćorić

=== Group A ===
		(Russia) Rublev	(Canada) Shapovalov	(South Korea) Chung	(Italy) Quinzi	RR W–L	Set W–L	Game W–L	Standings
1	(Russia) Andrey Rublev		4–1, 3–4^{(8–10)}, 4–3^{(7–2)}, 0–4, 4–3^{(7–3)}	0–4, 1–4, 3–4^{(1–7)}	1–4, 4–0, 4–3^{(7–3)}, 0–4, 4–3^{(7–3)}	2–1	6–7 (46.2%)	32–41 (43.8%)	2
3	(Canada) Denis Shapovalov	1–4, 4–3^{(10–8)}, 3–4^{(2–7)}, 4–0, 3–4^{(3–7)}		4–1, 3–4^{(5–7)}, 3–4^{(4–7)}, 1–4	4–1, 4–1, 3–4^{(5–7)}, 4–3^{(7–5)}	1–2	6–7 (46.2%)	41–37 (52.6%)	3
6	(South Korea) Chung Hyeon	4–0, 4–1, 4–3^{(7–1)}	1–4, 4–3^{(7–5)}, 4–3^{(7–4)}, 4–1		1–4, 4–1, 4–2, 3–4^{(6–8)}, 4–3^{(7–3)}	3–0	9–3 (75.0%)	41–29 (58.6%)	1
8/WC	(Italy) Gianluigi Quinzi	4–1, 0–4, 3–4^{(3–7)}, 4–0, 3–4^{(3–7)}	1–4, 1–4, 4–3^{(7–5)}, 3–4^{(5–7)}	4–1, 1–4, 2–4, 4–3^{(8–6)}, 3–4^{(3–7)}		0–3	5–9 (35.7%)	37–44 (45.7%)	4

Standings are determined by: 1. number of wins; 2. number of matches; 3. in two-players-ties, head-to-head records; 4. in three-players-ties, percentage of sets won, then percentage of games won, then head-to-head records; 5. ATP rankings.

=== Group B ===
		(Russia) Khachanov	(Croatia) Ćorić	(United States) Donaldson	(Russia) Medvedev	RR W–L	Set W–L	Game W–L	Standings
2	(Russia) Karen Khachanov		4–3^{(7–3)}, 4–2, 2–4, 0–4, 2–4	4–1, 4–3^{(7–3)}, 4–2	4–2, 3–4^{(6–8)}, 3–4^{(3–7)}, 2–4	1–2	6–6 (50.0%)	36–37 (49.3%)	3
4	(Croatia) Borna Ćorić	3–4^{(3–7)}, 2–4, 4–2, 4–0, 4–2		4–3^{(7–2)}, 4–1, 4–3^{(7–4)}	4–3^{(7–5)}, 2–4, 4–1, 4–2	3–0	9–3 (75.0%)	43–29 (59.7%)	1
5	(United States) Jared Donaldson	1–4, 3–4^{(3–7)}, 2–4	3–4^{(2–7)}, 1–4, 3–4^{(4–7)}		4–3^{(7–3)}, 2–4, 3–4^{(1–7)}, 0–4	0–3	1–9 (10.0%)	22–39 (36.1%)	4
7	(Russia) Daniil Medvedev	2–4, 4–3^{(8–6)}, 4–3^{(7–3)}, 4–2	3–4^{(5–7)}, 4–2, 1–4, 2–4	3–4^{(3–7)}, 4–2, 4–3^{(7–1)}, 4–0		2–1	7–5 (58.3%)	39–35 (52.7%)	2

Standings are determined by: 1. number of wins; 2. number of matches; 3. in two-players-ties, head-to-head records; 4. in three-players-ties, percentage of sets won, then percentage of games won, then head-to-head records; 5. ATP rankings.

== Controversy ==
For the tournament draw, players were asked to choose a female model to escort them onto the stage, and some of these models lifted or removed various articles of clothing to reveal a letter of the alphabet. This letter signified who would be playing whom. Widespread criticism followed. The ATP explained their choice, "The intention was to integrate Milan's rich heritage as one of the fashion capitals of the world. However, our execution of the proceedings was in poor taste and unacceptable. We deeply regret this and will ensure that there is no repeat of anything like it in the future."
