= 2024 Next Gen ATP Finals =

- Date: 18–22 December 2024
- Edition: 7th
- Draw: 8S
- Prize money: US$2,050,000
- Surface: Hard (indoor)
- Location: Jeddah, Saudi Arabia
- Venue: King Abdullah Sports City

Champions
- (Brazil) João Fonseca
- Next Gen ATP Finals

The 2024 Next Gen ATP Finals was a men's exhibition tennis tournament for the eight highest-ranked singles players on the 2024 ATP Tour who are aged 20 and under. It was held from 18 December to 22 December 2024 at King Abdullah Sports City in Jeddah, Saudi Arabia.

This was the first tournament to be played under the new rules which included lowering the age threshold from 21-and-under to 20-and-under.

João Fonseca defeated Learner Tien, 2–4, 4–3^{(10–8)}, 4–0, 4–2 to win the title. Ranked as the world No. 145 that time, Fonseca became the lowest ranked champion in the tournament's history.

Hamad Medjedovic was the reigning champion but was ineligible to defend his title due to his age.

== Race to qualification ==
The top eight players in the 2024 ATP Race to Jeddah qualified. Eligible players must be 20 or under at the end of the calendar year (i.e. born 2004 or later).

Player qualified for the Next Gen ATP Finals
Player withdrew

ATP Race to Jeddah as of 2 December 2024
| # | ATP rank | Player | Points | Birth year | Date qualified |
|---|---|---|---|---|---|
| 1 | 20 | Arthur Fils (FRA) | 2,355 | 2004 | 25 November |
| 2 | 41 | Alex Michelsen (USA) | 1,245 | 2004 | 25 November |
| 3 | 48 | Jakub Menšík (CZE) | 1,136 | 2005 | 25 November |
| 4 | 50 | Shang Juncheng (CHN) | 1,115 | 2005 | 25 November |
| 5 | 123 | Learner Tien (USA) | 493 | 2005 | 26 November |
| 6 | 128 | Luca Van Assche (FRA) | 471 | 2004 | 26 November |
| 7 | 138 | Nishesh Basavareddy (USA) | 440 | 2005 | 27 November |
| 8 | 145 | João Fonseca (BRA) | 409 | 2006 | 29 November |
Alternates
| 9 | 151 | Martín Landaluce (ESP) | 383 | 2006 | |
| – | 170 | Coleman Wong (HKG) | 340 | 2004 | |
| 10 | 171 | Henrique Rocha (POR) | 334 | 2004 | |

== Results ==
=== Final ===
- (Brazil) João Fonseca def. (United States) Learner Tien, 2–4, 4–3^{(10–8)}, 4–0, 4–2.

== Seeds ==
1. (France) Arthur Fils (round robin)
2. (United States) Alex Michelsen (semifinals)
3. (Czech Republic) Jakub Menšík (round robin)
4. (China) Shang Juncheng (round robin)
5. (United States) Learner Tien (final)
6. (France) Luca Van Assche (semifinals)
7. (United States) Nishesh Basavareddy (round robin)
8. (Brazil) João Fonseca (champion)

== Alternates ==
1. (Spain) Martín Landaluce (did not play)
2. (Portugal) Henrique Rocha (did not play)

== Draw ==
Key

- Q = Qualifier
- WC = Wild card
- LL = Lucky loser
- Alt = Alternate
- ITF = ITF entry
- PR = Protected ranking
- SR = Special ranking
- SE = Special exempt
- JE = Junior exempt
- JR = Junior Accelerator Programme entrant
- CO = College Accelerator Programme entrant
- NG = Next Gen Accelerator Program entrant
- w/o = Walkover
- r = Retired
- d = Defaulted

=== Finals ===
Semifinals
8 | (Brazil) João Fonseca | 4 | 4 | 4
6 | (France) Luca Van Assche | 2 | 2 | 1
2 | (United States) Alex Michelsen | 4 | 2 | 4 | 0 | 1
5 | (United States) Learner Tien | 2 | 4 | 1 | 4 | 4

Final
8 | (Brazil) João Fonseca | 2 | 4^{10} | 4 | 4
5 | (United States) Learner Tien | 4 | 3^{8} | 0 | 2

=== Blue Group ===
| | | (France) Fils | (Czech Republic) Menšík | (United States) Tien | (Brazil) Fonseca | RR; W–L | Set; W–L | Game; W–L | Standings |
| 1 | (France) Arthur Fils | | 4–2, 4–3^{(7–4)}, 4–2 | 2–4, 2–4, 4–3^{(7–4)}, 3–4^{(5–7)} | 4–3^{(11–9)}, 2–4, 1–4, 4–1, 1–4 | 1–2 | 6–6 (50%) | 35–38 (48%) | 3 |
| 3 | (Czech Republic) Jakub Menšík | 2–4, 3–4^{(4–7)}, 2–4 | | 3–4^{(6–8)}, 3–4^{(3–7)}, 4–2, 4–2, 3–4^{(8–10)} | 4–3^{(7–4)}, 3–4^{(8–10)}, 3–4^{(5–7)}, 4–3^{(7–4)}, 3–4^{(5–7)} | 0–3 | 4–9 (31%) | 41–46 (47%) | 4 |
| 5 | (United States) Learner Tien | 4–2, 4–2, 3–4^{(4–7)}, 4–3^{(7–5)} | 4–3^{(8–6)}, 4–3^{(7–3)}, 2–4, 2–4, 4–3^{(10–8)} | | 0–4, 0–4, 4–1, 2–4 | 2–1 | 7–6 (54%) | 37–41 (47%) | 2 |
| 8 | (Brazil) João Fonseca | 3–4^{(9–11)}, 4–2, 4–1, 1–4, 4–1 | 3–4^{(4–7)}, 4–3^{(10–8)}, 4–3^{(7–5)}, 3–4^{(4–7)}, 4–3^{(7–5)} | 4–0, 4–0, 1–4, 4–2 | | 3–0 | 9–5 (64%) | 47–35 (57%) | 1 |

=== Red Group ===
| | | (United States) Michelsen | (China) Shang | (France) Van Assche | (United States) Basavareddy | RR; W–L | Set; W–L | Game; W–L | Standings |
| 2 | (United States) Alex Michelsen | | 4–1, 1–1 ret. | 1–4, 4–2, 4–3^{(8–6)}, 4–3^{(7–5)} | 2–4, 4–3^{(7–5)}, 4–3^{(7–4)}, 4–2 | 3–0 | 9–2 (82%) | 39–24 (62%) | 1 |
| 4 | (China) Shang Juncheng | 1–4, 1–1 ret. | | 3–4^{(3–7)}, 4–2, 1–4, 3–4^{(5–7)} | 4–3^{(7–4)}, 2–4, 2–4, 1–4 | 0–3 | 2–9 (18%) | 20–41 (33%) | 4 |
| 6 | (France) Luca Van Assche | 4–1, 2–4, 3–4^{(6–8)}, 3–4^{(5–7)} | 4–3^{(7–3)}, 2–4, 4–1, 4–3^{(7–5)} | | 3–4^{(2–7)}, 4–3^{(9–7)}, 4–2, 4–2 | 2–1 | 7–5 (58%) | 41–35 (54%) | 2 |
| 7 | (United States) Nishesh Basavareddy | 4–2, 3–4^{(5–7)}, 3–4^{(4–7)}, 2–4 | 3–4^{(4–7)}, 4–2, 4–2, 4–1 | 4–3^{(7–2)}, 3–4^{(7–9)}, 2–4, 2–4 | | 1–2 | 5–7 (42%) | 38–38 (50%) | 3 |

Standings are determined by: 1. number of wins; 2. number of matches; 3. in two-players-ties, head-to-head records; 4. in three-players-ties, percentage of sets won, then percentage of games won, then head-to-head records; 5. ATP rankings.

Shang Juncheng's retirement against Alex Michelsen is counted as a 4-0 4-0 4-0 win for Michelsen.

== See also ==
- 2024 ATP Tour
- 2024 ATP Finals
