= Liam Caruana =

Italian-American tennis player

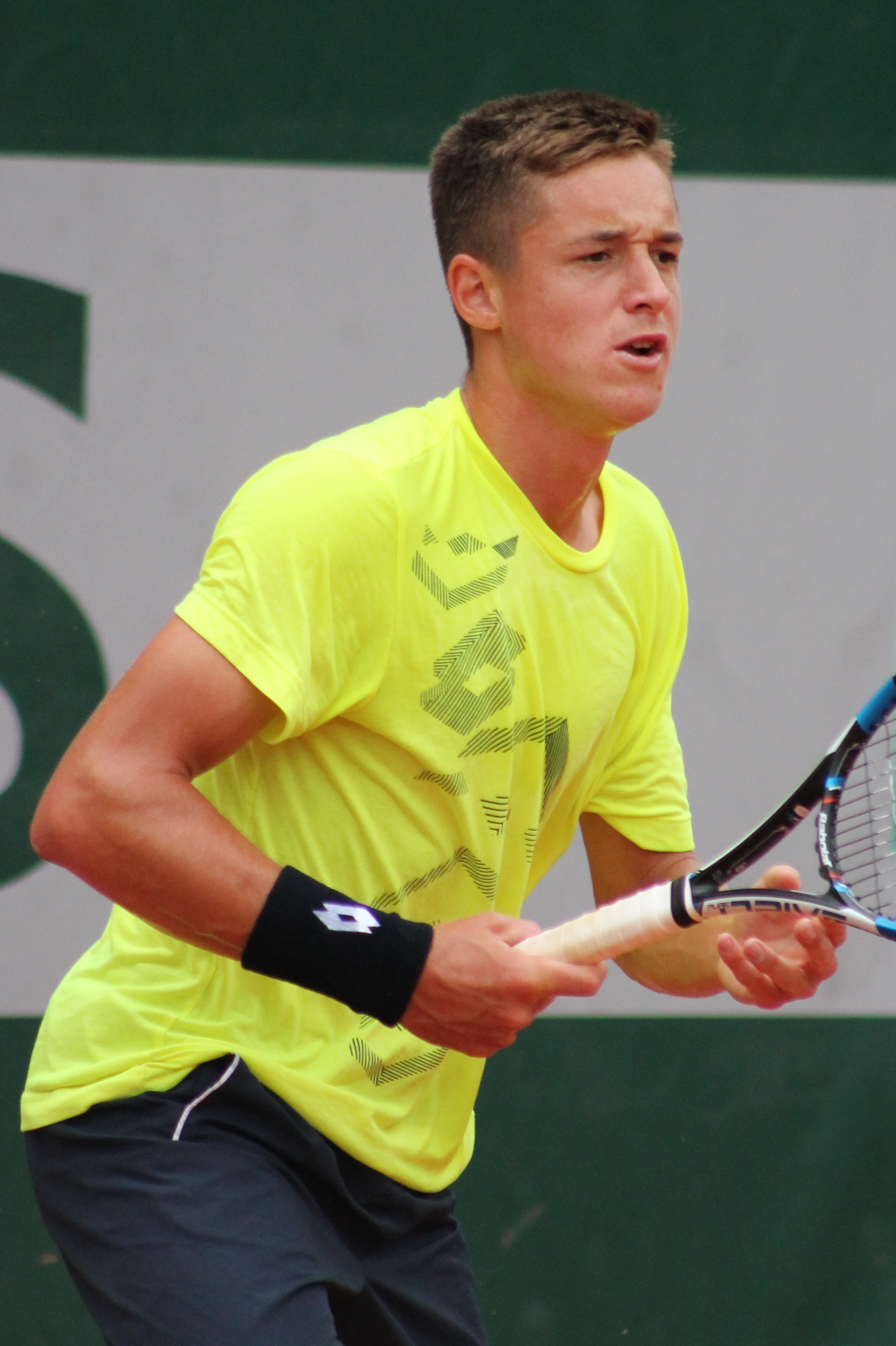
- Country (sports): Italy (2016–); United States (2012–16)
- Residence: Austin, United States
- Born: 22 January 1998 (age 27) Rome, Italy
- Height: 1.80 m (5 ft 11 in)
- Retired: 2021 (last match in 2020)
- Plays: Right-handed (two-handed backhand)
- Prize money: $102,916

Singles
- Career record: 0–4 (at ATP Tour level, Grand Slam level, and in Davis Cup)
- Career titles: 0
- Highest ranking: No. 375 (12 February 2018)

Doubles
- Career record: 0–0 (at ATP Tour level, Grand Slam level, and in Davis Cup)
- Career titles: 0
- Highest ranking: No. 564 (27 May 2019)
- Last updated on: 15 December 2024.

Liam Caruana (born 22 January 1998) is an Italian-American former tennis player. He has a career high ATP singles ranking of world No. 375 achieved on 12 February 2018. He also has a career high doubles ranking of No. 564 achieved on 27 May 2019.

Caruana made his ATP main draw debut at the 2018 ASB Classic in the singles draw as a lucky loser. Caruana received the Italian wildcard for the 2018 Next Generation ATP Finals in Milan after winning the wildcard playoff tournament.

Caruana retired in 2021 to become a real estate agent.
