= Holger Rune =

Danish tennis player (born 2003)

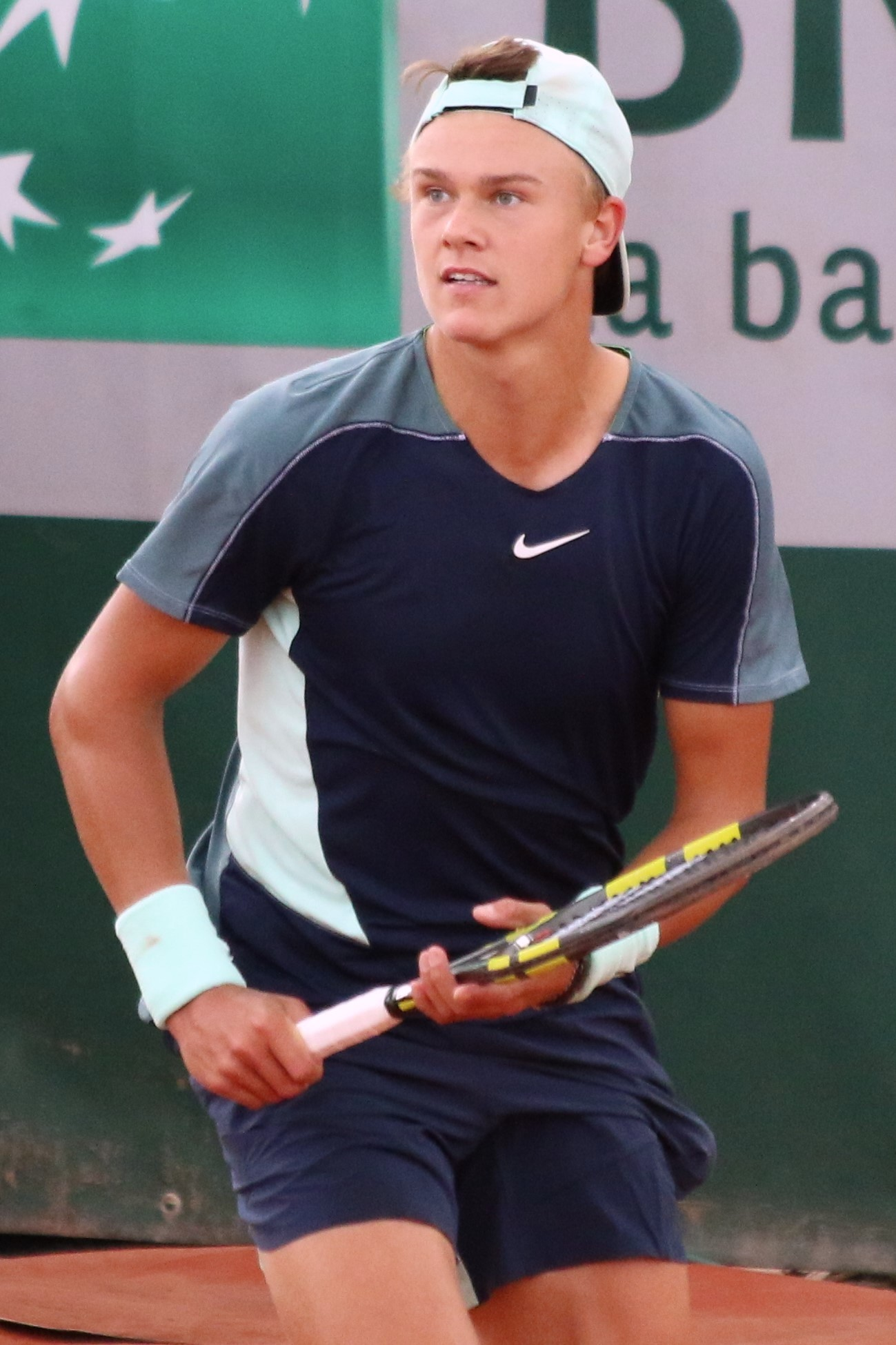
- Rune at the 2022 French Open
- Full name: Holger Vitus Nødskov Rune
- Country (sports): Denmark
- Residence: Monte Carlo, Monaco
- Born: 29 April 2003 (age 23) Gentofte, Denmark
- Height: 1.88 m (6 ft 2 in)
- Turned pro: 2020
- Plays: Right-handed (two-handed backhand)
- Coach: Kenneth Carlsen, Lars Christensen
- Prize money: US $16,756,381

Singles
- Career record: 175–107 (Note: In ATP Tour and Grand Slam main draw matches, Davis Cup and Laver Cup)
- Career titles: 5
- Highest ranking: No. 4 (21 August 2023)
- Current ranking: No. 315 (16 November 2026)

Grand Slam singles results
- Australian Open: 4R (2023, 2025)
- French Open: QF (2022, 2023)
- Wimbledon: QF (2023)
- US Open: 3R (2022)

Other tournaments
- Tour Finals: RR (2023)

Doubles
- Career record: 13–9
- Career titles: 0
- Highest ranking: No. 174 (26 September 2022)

Grand Slam doubles results
- US Open: 2R (2022)

Grand Slam mixed doubles results
- US Open: 1R (2025)
- Last updated on: 15 November 2026.

Holger Vitus Nødskov Rune (Danish: [ˈhʌlˀkɐ ˈviːtsʰus ˈnøðˌskʌwˀ ˈʁuːnə]; born 29 April 2003) is a Danish professional tennis player. He has been ranked as high as world No. 4 in singles by the ATP, making him the highest-ranked Danish man in the history of tennis. Rune has won five ATP Tour singles titles, including a Masters 1000 title at the 2022 Paris Masters, and has reached three major quarterfinals.

As a junior, Rune was a world No. 1 and won ten titles on the ITF Junior Circuit, including the 2019 French Open boys' title. After turning professional in 2020, he won five titles on the ITF World Tennis Tour and five on the ATP Challenger Tour and made his top 100 debut in 2022. Three months later, Rune reached his first ATP Tour final at the 2022 Bavarian International Tennis Championships, where he won his first title and subsequently entered the top 50. By winning the Paris Masters later that year, Rune made his top 10 debut and became the first player on record (since the ATP rankings began in 1973) to beat five top-10 opponents at the same event outside the ATP Finals.

== Early life ==
Rune was born on 29 April 2003 in Gentofte to Aneke Rune and Anders Nødskov. He has a sister named Alma and they grew up in Charlottenlund. He began playing tennis at the age of 6 because his sister played and he started to take the sport seriously. Throughout his childhood, he was coached by Lars Christensen, and along with his mother, he is credited as his biggest inspiration. His idol growing up was fellow tennis player Novak Djokovic. He started training at the Mouratoglou Tennis Academy in 2016, at the age of 13.

== Junior career ==
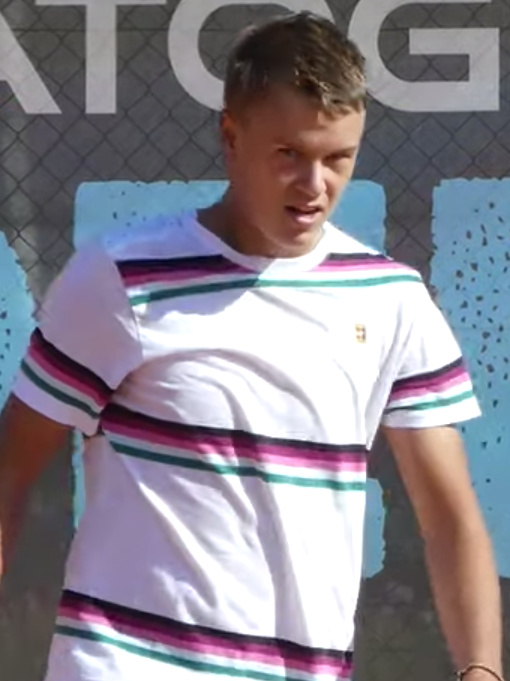
Rune practicing at the Mouratoglou Tennis Academy in 2019

In 2014, he became Danish U12 champion in mixed doubles with Clara Tauson. In 2017, he won the European U14 singles championship.

At age 15, he became the youngest Danish male singles champion by winning the 2019 indoor tournament. On 8 June 2019 Rune defeated Toby Alex Kodat to win the 2019 French Open boys' singles title. Holger received a wildcard and won a match at the 2019 Blois ATP Challenger in June. At the time, he was 16 years, 1 month and 18 days old. Holger also competed in the 2019 Amersfoort Challenger in July where he captured his second ATP Challenger match win. On 28 October 2019 he achieved a ITF juniors ranking of world No. 1 after he defeated Harold Mayot to win the ITF Junior Finals. Rune served as a practice partner at the 2019 ATP Finals.

== Professional career ==
=== 2020: First ITF title, Top 500 debut ===
Rune officially turned pro in 2020 at the age of 16. At the 2020 Auckland Open, Rune received a wildcard into the qualifying draw but lost to Vasek Pospisil in straight sets. In July 2020, Holger became the youngest player to compete at the Ultimate Tennis Showdown (UTS), where he was defeated by French player Corentin Moutet.

In September 2020, Rune won his first ITF title at an M25 event in Switzerland. He would make three more ITF finals by the end of 2020, winning two of the three. In October 2020, Rune received a wildcard to the ATP Challenger 80 in Puente Romano in Marbella, AnyTech365 Marbella Tennis Open. He lost in the first round to Elliot Benchetrit.

=== 2021: First ATP win, top 110 ===
Rune made three more ITF finals at the start of 2021, winning one.

In March 2021, Rune made his ATP debut as a wildcard in the Argentina Open. He lost in the first round to fifth seeded Albert Ramos Viñolas in three sets. At the Chile Open the next week, Rune was accepted into the qualifying draw as a wildcard. He went on to win the qualifying round and record his first ATP match win against Sebastián Báez in straight sets. He followed this up with his first top-30 victory over Benoît Paire in straight sets to reach his first ATP quarterfinal, where he lost to Federico Delbonis in straight sets. At the age of 17, he became the youngest ATP Tour quarterfinalist since 2014.

In June 2021, Rune won his first ATP Challenger title in Biella, defeating Marco Trungelliti. He created controversy in the same tournament due to homophobic slurs he made during his semi-final match. His actions were investigated by the ATP, and he was fined for what the ATP determined to be inappropriate language.

In July 2021, Rune received another wave of wildcards into several clay-court events during the summer clay-court swing: the Swedish Open, Croatia Open, and Austrian Open Kitzbühel. He posted a few more match wins in these tournaments which boosted his ranking to a career-high of No. 145 on 23 August 2021 after winning the San Marino Open and the Verona Challenger, making him the second youngest male player in the top 150.

Rune entered the 2021 US Open Qualifying as the 24th seed. There, he won all three of his qualifying matches to qualify for the 2021 US Open for his Major debut. He played world No. 1 Novak Djokovic in the first round, where he lost the first set and won the second set in a tiebreak, but started to cramp late in the third set and eventually lost the match.

Rune made his second ATP quarterfinal at the Moselle Open, after qualifying for the main draw. He double-bageled lucky loser Bernabé Zapata Miralles in the first round, and then upset fifth seed Lorenzo Sonego in the second round in three sets to make the quarterfinals. He lost in the quarterfinals to second seed Pablo Carreño Busta in three sets.

On 4 November 2021, Rune qualified for the 2021 Next Generation ATP Finals. He finished the year ranked No. 103 in the ATP rankings.

=== 2022: Paris Masters title and breaking into top 10 ===
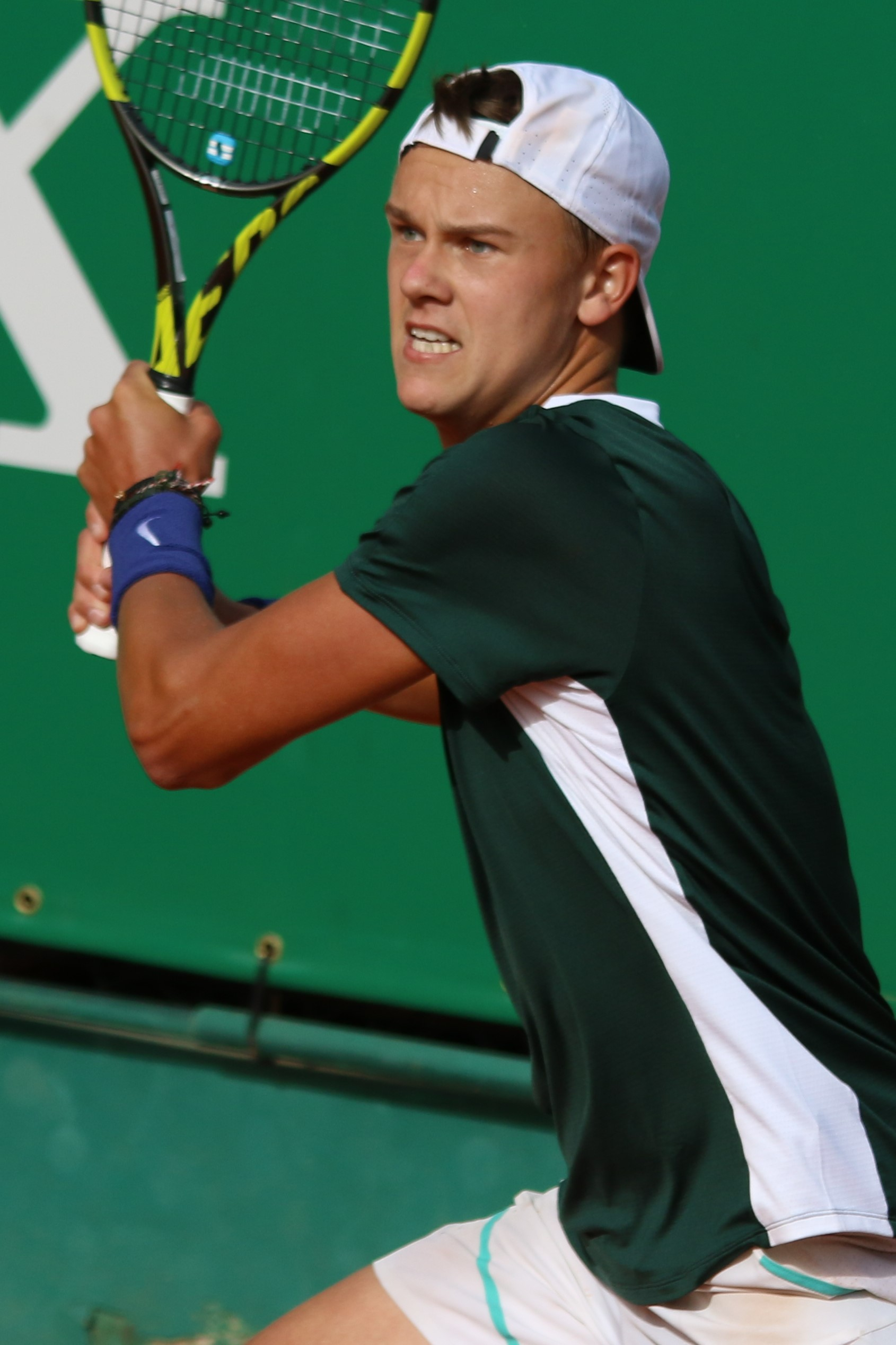
Rune at the 2022 Monte-Carlo Masters

Rune made his debut in the top 100 of the ATP singles rankings on 17 January 2022 at world No. 99, making him the second youngest male player after Carlos Alcaraz to be ranked in the top 100. At the 2022 Open 13, he reached his first career ATP semifinal in the doubles tournament with partner Hugo Gaston, defeating top seeds Nicolas Mahut and Pierre-Hugues Herbert and Polish pair Szymon Walków and Jan Zieliński before losing to eventual champions Andrey Rublev and Denys Molchanov.

In April, Rune received a wildcard to the Bavarian International Tennis Championships, where he defeated world No. 3 Alexander Zverev in the second round for his first top 10 win in his career in straight sets to advance to his third ATP quarterfinal. He then overcame Emil Ruusuvuori and Oscar Otte to reach his first career ATP singles final. There, his opponent, Botic van de Zandschulp, was forced to retire with chest pain with the scoreline at 3–4, leading the 70th-ranked Rune to become the tournament's third youngest champion in the Open Era after Guillermo Perez-Roldan in 1987. The title propelled Rune into the top 50 on 2 May 2022.

The following month, Rune made his main draw debut at the French Open, where he shocked 14th seed Denis Shapovalov in the first round before defeating Henri Laaksonen and Gaston in the second and third rounds, respectively, all in straight sets. He then stunned fourth seed Stefanos Tsitsipas to earn his third win of the season over a top 15 player to reach his first career Grand Slam quarterfinal, making him the first Danish man in singles to reach the quarterfinals of any Grand Slam tournament in the Open Era. There, he succumbed to Casper Ruud in four sets, but the achievement landed Rune inside the world's top 30.

Rune did not win a match between the French Open and Washington. In Washington, as the 9th seed, he beat Benoît Paire in the second round before losing to wildcard J.J. Wolf in the third round. In Montreal, Rune beat Fabio Fognini in straight sets in the first round, then lost to eventual champion Pablo Carreño Busta in the second round. In Cincinnati, Rune lost to 9th seed Cameron Norrie in the first round. At the US Open, Rune beat Peter Gojowczyk and received a walkover from John Isner to reach the third round, where he lost again to Norrie.

He reached his second ATP final in Sofia, beating Tim van Rijthoven, Lorenzo Sonego and Ilya Ivashka, then moved on to the final after defending champion and top seed Jannik Sinner retired in the middle of their match due to injury. He lost to Marc-Andrea Hüsler in the final. As a result, he qualified for the 2022 Next Generation ATP Finals in Milan on 30 September.

He reached his third final at the 2022 Stockholm Open by defeating fifth seed Alex de Minaur. As a result, he reached the top 25 in the rankings on 24 October 2022. He won his second title defeating top seed Stefanos Tsitsipas in the final. The following week at the next tournament in Basel he beat again seventh seeded Alex de Minaur in the first round. He reached the final defeating two Frenchmen Ugo Humbert and Arthur Rinderknech, and then sixth seed Roberto Bautista Agut in the semifinals. As a result, he made his top 20 debut in the rankings at No. 18 on 31 October 2022. He became only the fourth man born in the 2000s to reach the Top 20 in the ATP rankings.

He saved three match points in his opening match against Wawrinka on his debut at the 2022 Rolex Paris Masters. He then defeated four top-10 players in a row: 10th seed Hubert Hurkacz, world No. 9 and 7th seed Andrey Rublev, World No. 1 Carlos Alcaraz, and world No. 8 Félix Auger-Aliassime, to reach his first Masters 1000 and fourth final in a row. It was his 18th tour-level win in 20 matches. He defeated 6th seed and world No. 7 defending champion Novak Djokovic, his fifth top-10 win in a row, to win his first Masters 1000 title, the youngest champion in Paris since Boris Becker in 1986. He became the first man to beat five top-10 opponents in the same event (excluding the ATP Finals). As a result, he moved into the top 10 in the rankings on 7 November 2022. He also moved one position up as first alternate for the 2022 ATP Finals and on the same day, on 6 November 2022, he decided to withdraw from the 2022 Next Generation ATP Finals.

=== 2023: Two Masters 1000 finals, world No. 4 ===
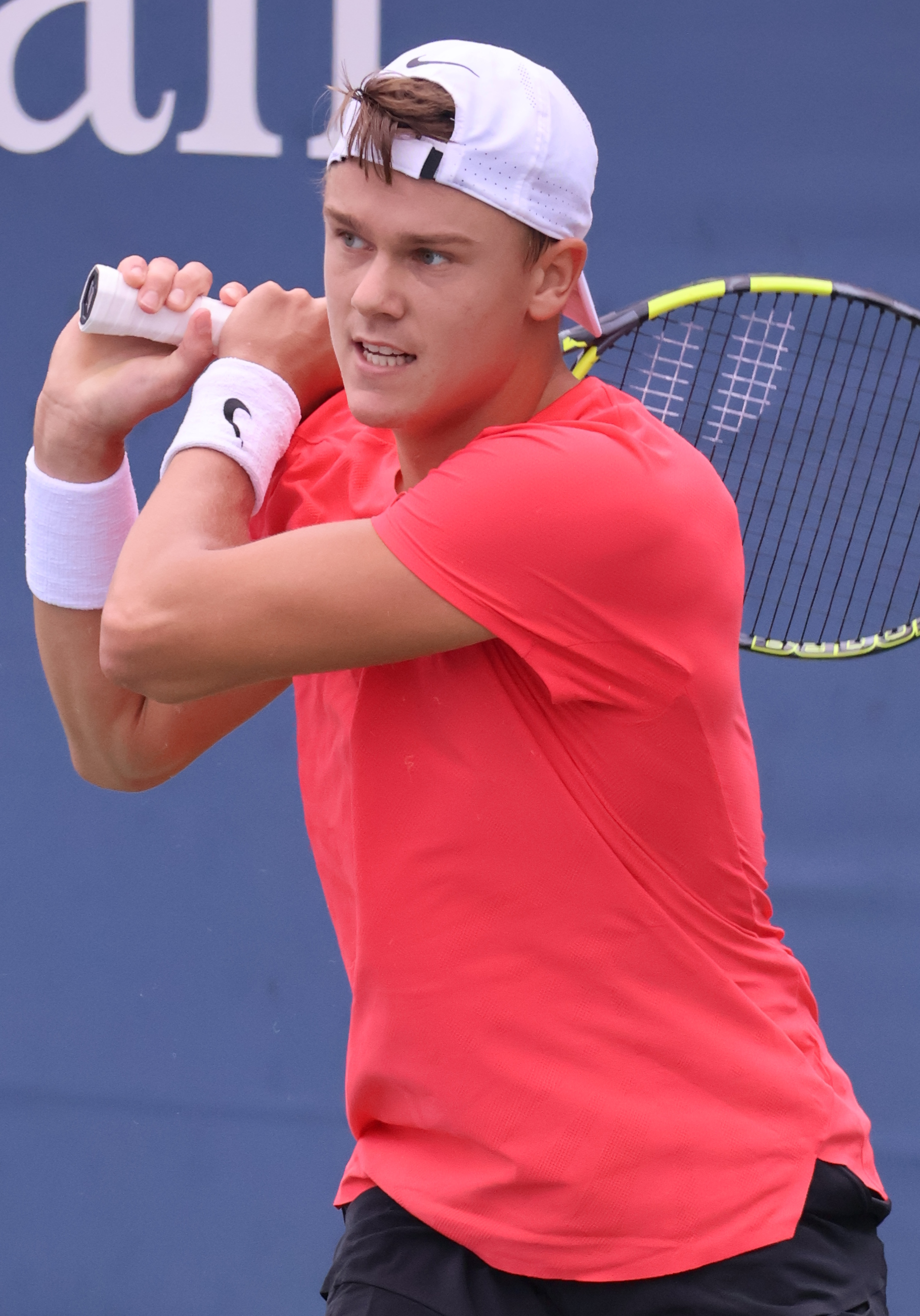
Rune at the 2023 US Open

Following his semifinal showing at the Mexican Open, he moved up two spots in the singles rankings to world No. 8 on 6 March 2023.

At the 2023 Monte-Carlo Masters he defeated third seed Daniil Medvedev to reach the semifinals marking his first top-5 win of the season and tenth top-10 win overall. Next he defeated another top-10 player Jannik Sinner to reach his second Masters final, before losing to Andrey Rublev in three sets. As a result, he moved to world No. 7 in the rankings on 17 April 2023 making him the highest ranked Dane in history (tied with Kurt Nielsen). Next at the 2023 BMW Open, he reached his second consecutive final on clay following wins over Yannick Hanfmann, Cristian Garín, and Christopher O'Connell to set up a rematch of the previous year's final with Botic van de Zandschulp. He won in three sets to successfully defend his title and lift his first trophy of the season. On his debut at the Rome Masters he defeated world No. 1 Novak Djokovic for a second time to reach the semifinals. He defeated fourth seed Casper Ruud for his second top-5 win in a row to reach his second Masters final of the season. He moved to a new career high ranking of world No. 6 making him the highest Danish player in history of the ATP rankings. At the 2023 French Open he reached the quarterfinals defeating 23rd seed Francisco Cerúndolo for a second consecutive season but lost to fourth seed and previous year runner-up Casper Ruud.

At the 2023 Queen's Club Championships he won his first match on grass as a senior against American Maxime Cressy. He reached the semifinals without dropping a set, defeating sixth seed Lorenzo Musetti in the quarterfinals. He reached the quarterfinals at Wimbledon losing to eventual champion top seed Carlos Alcaraz.

Following the results of the 2023 National Bank Open, he debuted in the top 5 of the ATP rankings for the first time on 14 August 2023 at No. 5. A week later, on 21 August 2023, he attained a new career-high ranking of No. 4 following his second round showing at the 2023 Western & Southern Open. This also ensured that he will receive his highest seeding at a Grand Slam at the US Open as the fourth seed.

=== 2024: 100th win, Masters semifinal, back to top 15 ===
At the Open Sud de France Rune recorded his 100th career win, over Pablo Llamas Ruiz, becoming only the second Danish man in the Open Era to hit that milestone, after Kenneth Carlsen who had 266 wins.

At the Monte-Carlo Masters he reached the quarterfinals in the longest best-of-three match in the tournament history lasting three and half hours, saving two match points, edging out ninth seed Grigor Dimitrov. He subsequently lost to Jannik Sinner in the quarter-finals in another three-set match. During his attempted title defence at the Bavarian International Tennis Championships, he reached the semi-finals, beating both Daniel Elahí Gálán and Marc-Andrea Huesler in straight sets before losing to Jan-Lennard Struff. He then lost in the third round in both the Madrid and Italian opens, losing to Tallon Griekspoor and Sebastian Baez, respectively. At the French Open he beat Dan Evans, then defeated Flavio Cobolli in a five-set match after being 0–5 down in the match tiebreak. He then beat Jozef Kovalík in the third round in straight sets, before succumbing to Alexander Zverev in the fourth round in five sets.

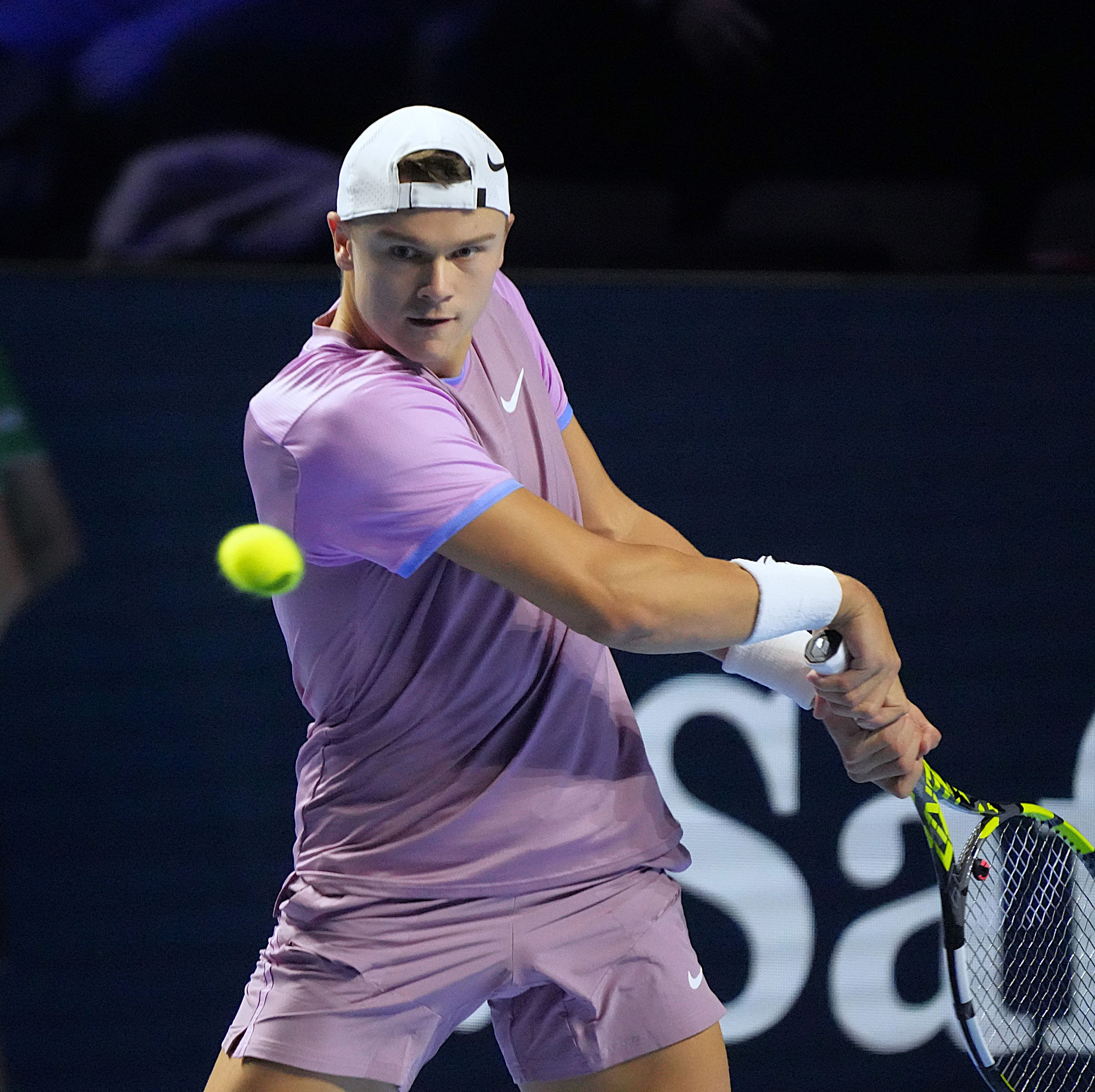
Holger Rune, ATP Basel 2024

In the Queen's Club Championships he lost in the first round to Jordan Thompson in three sets. At Wimbledon, Rune reached the fourth round before losing to second seed Novak Djokovic. Rune retired due to a knee injury during his quarterfinal match with eventual champion Arthur Fils at the Hamburg Open. He pulled out of the Paris Olympics citing a long-standing wrist problem.

At the Cincinnati Open he reached his fourth Masters semifinal. As a result, he returned to the top 15 in the rankings on 19 August 2024. He lost to Frances Tiafoe in three sets.

At the Japan Open, Rune defeated Kei Nishikori in the quarterfinals, before losing in the semifinals to eventual champion Arthur Fils. Seeded fourth, Rune reached the semifinals at the Swiss Indoors with straight sets wins over Nicolás Jarry, Dominic Stricker and David Goffin. He lost in the last four to Giovanni Mpetshi Perricard.

=== 2025: Masters finalist, back to top 10, injury, early season end ===
At the 2025 BNP Paribas Open, Rune reached the final at the tournament for the first time with defeats over eighth seed Stefanos Tsitsipas,Tallon Griekspoor, and fifth seed Daniil Medvedev, his 150th win (second Dane in the Open Era after Kenneth Carlsen). It was his fourth Masters final and he was the first Danish player and the second-youngest Scandinavian to reach that stage in Indian Wells after Stefan Edberg in 1987.

In April, Rune won the Barcelona Open, against Carlos Alcaraz in two sets. This marked Rune's first ATP 500 title, and he returned to the top 10 in over a year following the title, at world No. 9 on 21 April 2025.

At the 2025 Italian Open Rune lost in the fourth longest match at the tournament since 1991 (lasting 3 hours and 45 minutes) to Corentin Moutet, in the third round. It was Moutet's first top 10 win.

At the 2025 Stockholm Open Rune reached the semifinals but retired in his match against Ugo Humbert leading by a set, with a season-ending torn Achilles tendon injury. Despite the result he returned to the Top 10 in the singles rankings on 20 October 2025.

=== 2026: Recovery, out of top 100 ===
Rune spent the first half of the year recovering from the injury and, subsequently, dropped out of the top 100.

== Coaching ==
Rune is well known for frequently changing his coaches.

Rune's childhood coach Lars Christensen accompanied him at the start of his professional career. In October 2022, Rune hired Patrick Mouratoglou as an additional coach. On 3 April 2023, Rune and Mouratoglou announced they would part ways. A few weeks later, Rune rehired Mouratoglou to coach him at Roland-Garros. They continued to work together until August, when Rune announced their split again. Rune's mother, Aneke Rune, has said that "ego clashes" within the coaching team resulted in the termination of Mouratoglou's involvement. In November, Danish media reported that Christensen had also left Rune's team.

In October, Rune hired Boris Becker as his coach for the remainder of the 2023 season. At the time, Becker was unable to travel to the UK as a result of his criminal conviction and jail sentence for fraudulent bankruptcy. Rune commented that this should not make a difference in their collaboration, and was quoted saying "I didn't think about that". Becker encouraged Rune to attempt to play without a hat and without jewellery, items which could distract him during matches, a strategy which Becker himself found useful during his own playing career. Rune followed this advice at the 2023 Swiss Indoors in Basel, where he reached the semifinals. In November, Becker and Rune confirmed that their partnership would extend into 2024. In December, Severin Lüthi was confirmed to have joined Rune's coaching team. Rune split with Lüthi in January 2024. Shortly afterwards, on 5 February 2024, Becker announced he would cease coaching Rune due to other responsibilities.

On 21 February 2024, Rune announced that he would reunite with former coach Patrick Mouratoglou. On 28 July 2024, Rune announced via Instagram that he and Mouratoglou had decided to part ways for a third time.

In August 2024, Rune hired Danish former player Kenneth Carlsen as his new head coach. Carlsen had already been part of Rune's team in an occasional capacity throughout 2024. In September 2024, as Carlsen was unable to accompany Rune to the tournaments in Asia, Rune hired Benjamin Ebrahimzadeh as a temporary coach. In October 2024, Rune announced that he had rehired Lars Christensen to work alongside Carlsen.

== Playing style and equipment ==
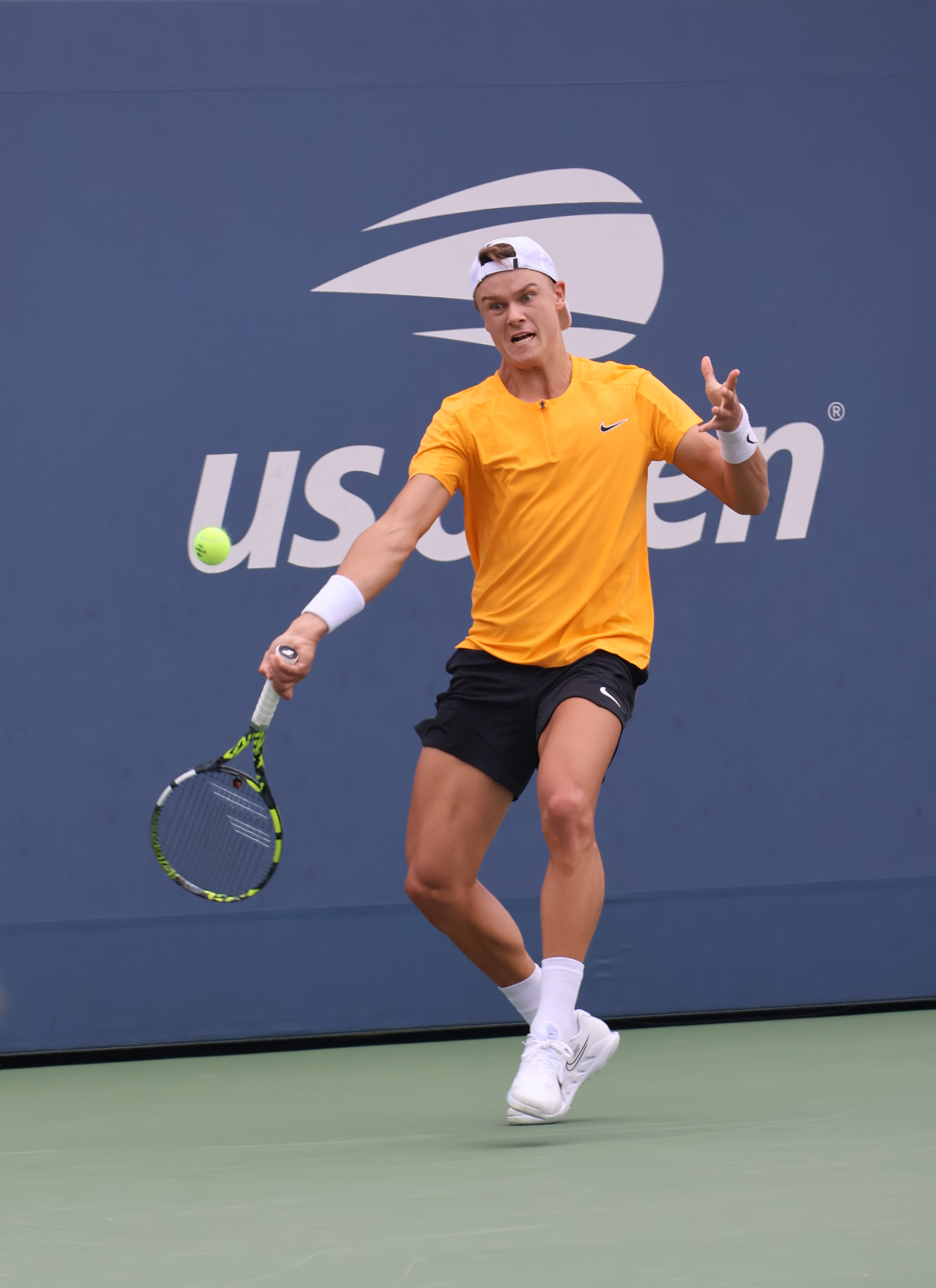
Holger Rune hitting a forehand

Rune is an all-court player with notable defensive skills, using a compact forehand and a consistent backhand to effectively move his opponents from any part of the court. According to fellow player Andrey Rublev, "Holger is the guy who runs a lot, and he runs really well...He [has] a good touch. He doesn't give you any rhythm, because as soon as he [has a] chance he [tries] to do dropshots, he try to hit full power, go to the net, return and go to the net, then serve to the net. So with him, you need really to pass these three, four shots to be able to give your rhythm and to dictate your style of the game."

Rune utilizes a semi-western grip for his forehand and an eastern/continental grip on his backhand, which is known as a consistent strength for Rune, especially on his aggressive return.

Earlier in his professional career, Rune used the Babolat Pure Aero 98 as his racket; in 2026, upon returning from his Achilles tendon injury, he switched to Wilson's new Defyer 98 Pro model. He is endorsed by Nike for his clothing and his shoes, and is sponsored by Rolex for watches.

== Career statistics ==
=== Grand Slam singles performance timeline ===
Key
W	F	SF	QF	#R	RR	Q#	DNQ	A	NH

(W) winner; (F) finalist; (SF) semifinalist; (QF) quarterfinalist; (#R) rounds 4, 3, 2, 1; (RR) round-robin stage; (Q#) qualification round; (DNQ) did not qualify; (A) absent; (NH) not held; (SR) strike rate (events won / competed); (W–L) win–loss record.
To avoid confusion and double counting, these charts are updated at the conclusion of a tournament or when the player's participation has ended.

Current through the 2025 US Open.

Tournament	2021	2022	2023	2024	2025	2026	SR	W–L	Win %
Australian Open	A	1R	4R	2R	4R	A	0 / 4	7–4	64%
French Open	A	QF	QF (Note: Rune's second round opponent, Gaël Monfils, withdrew before the second round of the 2023 French Open, which does not officially count as a win.)	4R	4R	A	0 / 4	13–4	76%
Wimbledon	A	1R	QF	4R	1R	A	0 / 4	7–4	64%
US Open	1R	3R (Note: Rune's second round opponent, John Isner, withdrew before the second round of the 2022 US Open, which does not officially count as a win.)	1R	1R	2R	A	0 / 5	2–5	29%
Win–loss	0–1	5–4	10–4	7–4	7–4	0–0	0 / 17	29–17	63%

=== ATP 1000 tournaments ===
==== Singles: 4 (1 title, 3 runner-ups) ====
Result	Year	Tournament	Surface	Opponent	Score
Win	2022	Paris Masters	Hard (i)	(Serbia) Novak Djokovic	3–6, 6–3, 7–5
Loss	2023	Monte-Carlo Masters	Clay	Andrey Rublev	7–5, 2–6, 5–7
Loss	2023	Italian Open	Clay	Daniil Medvedev	5–7, 5–7
Loss	2025	Indian Wells Open	Hard	(United Kingdom) Jack Draper	2–6, 2–6

== See also ==
- List of Denmark Davis Cup team representatives
