= PalaLido =

Indoor arena, Milan, Italy

- Allianz Cloud Arena
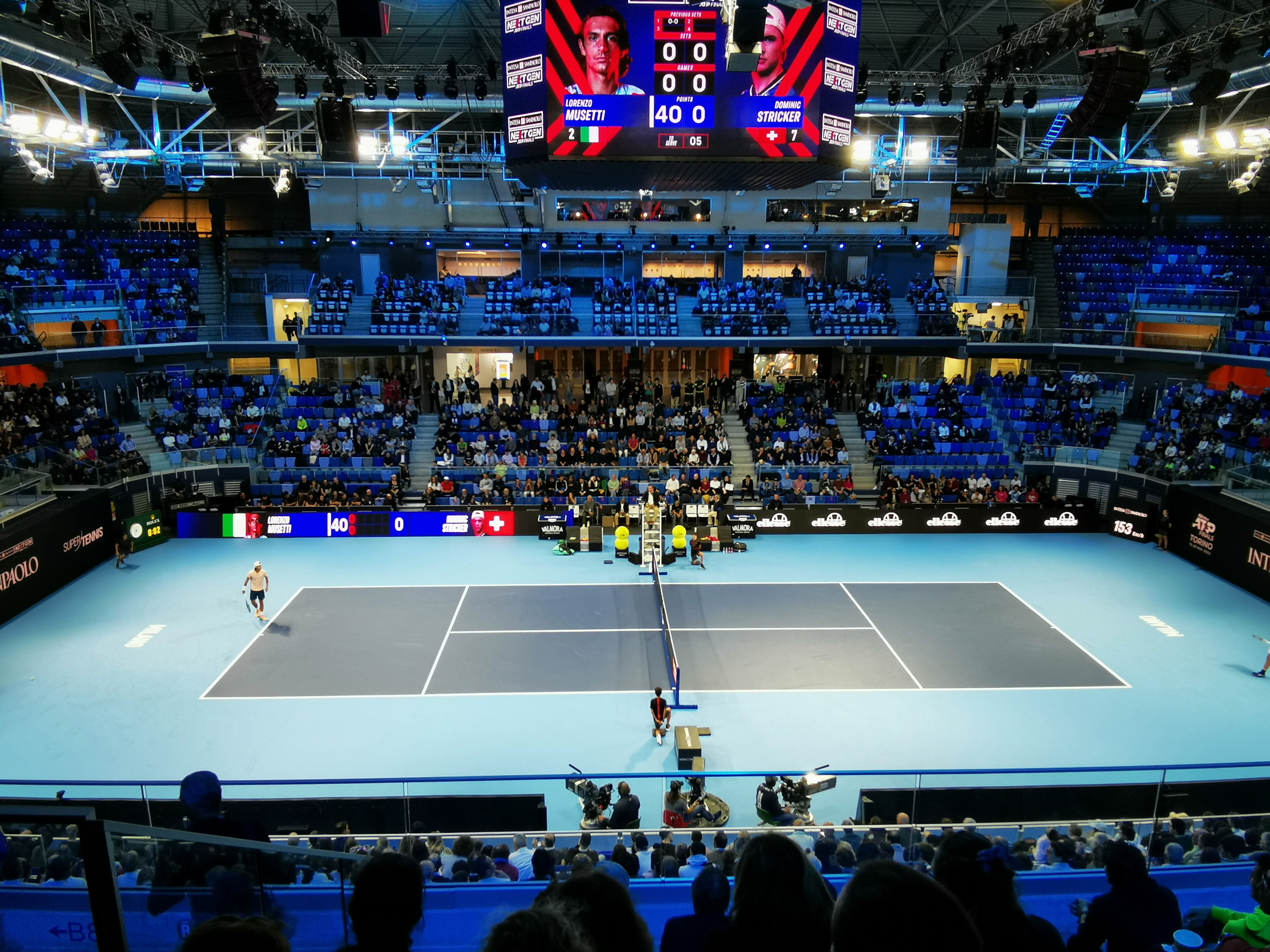
- Interior of the arena during a tennis match
- Interactive map of PalaLido
- Location: Milan, Lombardy, Italy
- Coordinates: 45.4826°N 9.1423°E
- Owner: Municipality of Milan
- Capacity: 5,420
- Surface: Parquet

Construction
- Opened: 1961
- Renovated: 2005; 2010–2019
- Cost: €9 million (2016 reconstruction)

Tenant
- Power Volley Milano

The PalaLido, officially called Allianz Cloud Arena for sponsorship reasons, is a multi-purpose indoor arena that is located in the Italian city of Milan, capital of Lombardy. The arena's primary use is to host basketball and volleyball games, but it can also be used to host handball, tennis, gymnastics, and wrestling. The arena currently has a seating capacity of 5,420 for sports events.

== History ==
PalaLido originally opened in 1961.

On June 17, 1980, Devo performed at the arena during their Freedom of Choice tour. The show was originally planned to happen at the Velodromo Vigorelli, but due to rain, it was moved to the Palalido.

The arena was once used as the home arena of the top-tier level Italian League basketball club Olimpia Milano.

In 2005, the arena's seating capacity was increased from 3,500 to 3,800. In 2011, a rebuild of the arena began. Finally, in 2019, the arena was reopened, with a new seating capacity of 5,420.

Currently, the arena is the home arena of Power Volley Milano which plays in the highest level of Italian Volleyball League.

Since 2019 this facility has been hosting the tennis tournament Next Generation ATP Finals.

== Wrestling and Combat Sports ==
On October 3, 2020, it was the venue for Bellator Milan 3.

== See also ==
- List of indoor arenas in Italy
