= 2019 NCAA Division I Tennis Championships =

- Date: May 3–25, 2019
- Edition: 74th (Men), 38th (Women)
- Location: First and second rounds: Campus sites Remainder: Orlando, Florida
- Venue: USTA National Campus; Hosted by: University of Central Florida and the Greater Orlando Sports Commission

Champions

Men's singles
- (United Kingdom) Paul Jubb (South Carolina)

Women's singles
- (United States) Estela Perez-Somarriba (Miami (FL))

Men's doubles
- (United States) Maxime Cressy and (United States) Keegan Smith (UCLA)

Women's doubles
- (United States) Gabby Andrews and (United States) Ayan Broomfield (UCLA)

Men's team
- Texas

Women's team
- Stanford
- NCAA Division I Tennis Championships

The 2019 NCAA Division I Tennis Championships were men's and women's tennis tournaments played concurrently from May 3 to May 25, 2019, at campus sites and at the USTA National Campus in Orlando, Florida. The events marked the 74th edition of the NCAA Division I Men's Tennis Championship and the 38th edition of the NCAA Division I Women's Tennis Championship.

The University of Texas won its first men's tennis national title with a 4–1 victory in the final over Wake Forest, the defending champion. Stanford University captured its record 20th women's tennis championship, shutting out top seed Georgia.

Paul Jubb of South Carolina and Estela Pérez-Somarriba of Miami (Florida) were crowned men's and women's singles champions. UCLA won both the men's and women's doubles titles - Maxime Cressy and Keegan Smith in the men's, and Gabby Andrews and Ayan Broomfield in the women's. It was the first time since 1988 that a school swept the NCAA doubles championships.

== Men's Team Championship ==
=== National seeds ===
1. Ohio State (quarterfinals)
2. Texas (National Champions)
3. Florida (semifinals)
4. Wake Forest (finalists)

5. Virginia (quarterfinals)
6. Baylor (quarterfinals)
7. Mississippi State (third round)
8. USC (third round)

9. North Carolina (semifinals)
10. TCU (quarterfinals)
11. UCLA (third round)
12. Stanford (third round)

13. Texas A&M (second round)
14. Tennessee (third round)
15. Illinois (second round)
16. Columbia (third round)

=== Bracket ===
First round May 3–4, 2019; National Seed Home Court
1	Ohio State	4
Cleveland State	0
Columbus, Ohio
Notre Dame	3
Vanderbilt	4
Penn State	4
Monmouth	0
New York, New York
Bryant	0
16	Columbia	4
9	North Carolina	4
Navy	0
Chapel Hill, North Carolina
Georgia	4
Elon	0
San Diego	4
Minnesota	1
Los Angeles, California
Northern Arizona	0
8	USC	4
5	Virginia	4
St. John's	0
Charlottesville, Virginia
South Carolina	4
East Tennessee State	0
Texas Tech	1
UC Santa Barbara	4
Palo Alto, California
Fresno State	0
12	Stanford	4
13	Texas A&M	4
Texas A&M–Corpus Christi	0
College Station, Texas
Oklahoma	4
Arizona	0
Kentucky	4
VCU	1
Winston-Salem, North Carolina
Morgan State	0
4	Wake Forest	5
3	Florida	4
Florida Gulf Coast	0
Gainesville, Florida
Florida State	4
UCF	3
NC State	4
Middle Tennessee	0
Knoxville, Tennessee
Radford	0
14	Tennessee	4
11	UCLA	4
Grand Canyon	0
Los Angeles, California
Oklahoma State	4
Ole Miss	1
Michigan	4
Dartmouth	2
Waco, Texas
Utah	0
6	Baylor	4
7	Mississippi State	4
Alabama State	0
Starkville, Mississippi
Tulane	1
South Alabama	4
Arizona State	4
Miami (FL)	0
Fort Worth, Texas
Harvard	1
10	TCU	4
15	Illinois	4
Western Michigan	0
Urbana, Illinois
California	4
Drake	1
Alabama	3
South Florida	4
Austin, Texas
Tennessee Tech	0
2	Texas	4

Second round May 3–4, 2019; National Seed Home Court
1	Ohio State	4
Vanderbilt	0
Penn State	0
16	Columbia	4
9	North Carolina	4
Georgia	1
San Diego	0
8	USC	4
5	Virginia	4
South Carolina	1
UC Santa Barbara	0
12	Stanford	4
13	Texas A&M	3
Oklahoma	4
Kentucky	1
4	Wake Forest	4
3	Florida	4
Florida State	0
NC State	2
14	Tennessee	4
11	UCLA	4
Oklahoma State	0
Michigan	1
6	Baylor	4
7	Mississippi State	4
South Alabama	0
Arizona State	1
10	TCU	4
15	Illinois	1
California	4
South Florida	1
2	Texas	4

Super regionals May 10–11, 2019; Highest Remaining Seed Home Court
1	Ohio State	4
16	Columbia	1
9	North Carolina	4
8	USC	1
5	Virginia	4
12	Stanford	2
Oklahoma	1
4	Wake Forest	4
3	Florida	4
14	Tennessee	2
11	UCLA	1
6	Baylor	4
7	Mississippi State	2
10	TCU	4
California	0
2	Texas	4

Quarterfinals; May 16, 2019; Orlando, FL
1	Ohio State	2
9	North Carolina	4
5	Virginia	2
4	Wake Forest	4
3	Florida	4
6	Baylor	0
10	TCU	1
2	Texas	4

Semifinals; May 18, 2019; Orlando, FL
9	North Carolina	3
4	Wake Forest	4
3	Florida	2
2	Texas	4

Championship; May 19, 2019; Orlando, FL
4	Wake Forest	1
2	Texas	4

== Women's Team Championship ==
=== National seeds ===
1. Georgia (finalists)
2. North Carolina (semifinals)
3. Stanford (National Champions)
4. South Carolina (quarterfinals)

5. Duke (semifinals)
6. Pepperdine (quarterfinals)
7. UCLA (quarterfinals)
8. Vanderbilt (quarterfinals)

9. Texas (second round)
10. Washington (third round)
11. Florida State (second round)
12. NC State (third round)

13. USC (third round)
14. Kansas (third round)
15. Oklahoma State (third round)
16. Michigan (third round)

=== Bracket ===
First round May 3–5, 2019; National Seed Home Court
1	Georgia	4
Alabama State	0
Athens, Georgia
Austin Peay	0
Wake Forest	4
Kentucky	4
DePaul	1
Ann Arbor, Michigan
Illinois-Chicago	0
16	Michigan	4
9	Texas	4
LIU Brooklyn	0
Austin, Texas
Rice	3
Texas A&M	4
Ohio State	3
Georgia Tech	4
Nashville, Tennessee
Miami (Ohio)	0
8	Vanderbilt	4
5	Duke	4
James Madison	0
Durham, North Carolina
Arizona State	4
Illinois	0
Tennessee	4
Furman	0
Raleigh, North Carolina
VCU	1
12	NC State	4
13	USC	4
Illinois State	0
Los Angeles, California
UNLV	4
Texas Tech	3
Virginia	4
Old Dominion	2
Columbia, South Carolina
North Florida	0
4	South Carolina	4
3	Stanford	4
New Mexico State	0
Palo Alto, California
Wisconsin	2
Syracuse	4
Florida	4
Boston College	1
Lawrence, Kansas
Denver	0
14	Kansas	4
11	Florida State	4
South Alabama	0
Tallahassee, Florida
Alabama	0
UCF	4
California	4
Long Beach State	2
Malibu, California
Fairfield	0
6	Pepperdine	4
7	UCLA	4
Northern Arizona	0
Los Angeles, California
San Diego	2
LSU	4
Northwestern	1
Princeton	4
Seattle, Washington
Army	0
10	Washington	4
15	Oklahoma State	4
Central Arkansas	0
Stillwater, Oklahoma
Washington State	3
Miami (FL)	4
Oklahoma	4
Winthrop	3
Chapel Hill, North Carolina
South Carolina State	0
2	North Carolina	4

Second round May 3–5, 2019; National Seed Home Court
1	Georgia	4
Wake Forest	0
Kentucky	0
16	Michigan	4
9	Texas	1
Texas A&M	4
Georgia Tech	0
8	Vanderbilt	4
5	Duke	4
Arizona State	0
Tennessee	0
12	NC State	4
13	USC	4
UNLV	0
Virginia	1
4	South Carolina	4
3	Stanford	4
Syracuse	1
Florida	2
14	Kansas	4
11	Florida State	1
UCF	4
California	2
6	Pepperdine	4
7	UCLA	4
LSU	0
Princeton	0
10	Washington	4
15	Oklahoma State	4
Miami (FL)	3
Oklahoma	0
2	North Carolina	4

Super regionals May 10–11, 2019; Highest Remaining Seed Home Court
1	Georgia	4
16	Michigan	2
Texas A&M	0
8	Vanderbilt	4
5	Duke	4
12	NC State	0
13	USC	0
4	South Carolina	4
3	Stanford	4
14	Kansas	3
UCF	2
6	Pepperdine	4
7	UCLA	4
10	Washington	0
15	Oklahoma State	2
2	North Carolina	4

Quarterfinals; May 17, 2019; Orlando, FL
1	Georgia	4
8	Vanderbilt	3
5	Duke	4
4	South Carolina	1
3	Stanford	4
6	Pepperdine	1
7	UCLA	1
2	North Carolina	4

Semifinals; May 18, 2019; Orlando, FL
1	Georgia	4
5	Duke	2
3	Stanford	5
2	North Carolina	2

Championship; May 19, 2019; Orlando, FL
1	Georgia	0
3	Stanford	4

== Men's Singles Championship ==
Entering the championship, Nuno Borges of Mississippi State had not lost a single match throughout the spring season, with a perfect 25–0 record at the No. 1 singles position. The senior advanced to the final without dropping a set.

South Carolina's Paul Jubb, seeded fourth, upset top-seeded Borges in the championship, 6–3, 7–6. Borges had defeated Jubb twice in the regular season. Jubb became the first national collegiate tennis champion representing South Carolina, and the first British man to win the NCAA men's singles championship.

=== National seeds ===
1. Nuno Borges, Mississippi State
2. J. J. Wolf, Ohio State
3. Alex Rybakov, TCU (Note: Carl Söderlund of Virginia was originally named the third seed in the tournament, but withdrew prior to the tournament due to injury. The fourth through eighth seeds were each moved up a seed and Crawford was moved from a 9-16 seed to the 8th seed.)
4. Paul Jubb, South Carolina (National Champion)
5. Brandon Holt, USC
6. Christian Sigsgaard, Texas
7. Aleksandar Kovacevic, Illinois
8. Oliver Crawford, Florida

Players ranked 9th–16th, listed by last name (Note: Petros Chrysochos and Borna Gojo of Wake Forest, Axel Geller of Stanford, and Thomas Laurent of Oregon were originally named to the list of 9-16 seeds, but withdrew prior to the tournament. Blumberg, Cressy, and Schretter were selected as seeds. Two seeded positions (including the spot of Crawford who became the 8th seed) were replaced by unseeded players.)

- Alberto Barroso-Campos, South Florida
- William Blumberg, North Carolina
- Maxime Cressy, UCLA
- Yuya Ito, Texas
- Nicolas Moreno de Alboran, UC Santa Barbara
- Johannes Schretter, Baylor

=== Draw ===
==== Finals ====
Quarterfinals
1	(Portugal) Nuno Borges (Mississippi State)	7	6
5	(United States) Brandon Holt (USC)	5	3
3	(United States) Alex Rybakov (TCU)	6	3	6
9-16	(United States) William Blumberg (North Carolina)	4	6	2
(Italy) Giovanni Oradini (Mississippi State)	6	3
4	(United Kingdom) Paul Jubb (South Carolina)	7	6
7	(United States) Aleksandar Kovacevic (Illinois)	6	7	6
(United States) Sam Riffice (Florida)	7	6	3

Semifinals
1	(Portugal) Nuno Borges (Mississippi State)	7	6
3	(United States) Alex Rybakov (TCU)	5	3
4	(United Kingdom) Paul Jubb (South Carolina)	4	6	6
7	(United States) Aleksandar Kovacevic (Illinois)	6	4	2

Final
1	(Portugal) Nuno Borges (Mississippi State)	3	6
4	(United Kingdom) Paul Jubb (South Carolina)	6	7

==== Section 1 ====
First round
1	Nuno Borges (Mississippi State)	6	6
Alexis Galarneau (NC State)	4	2
Felipe Sarrasagaue (Elon)	1	6
Andy Andrade (Florida)	6	7
Jason Kros (Virginia Tech)	3	0
Timo Stodder (Tennessee)	6	6
Majed Kilani (Tulsa)	2	2
Keegan Smith (UCLA)	6	6
5	Brandon Holt (USC)	6	6
Nicaise Muamba (Liberty)	1	1
Emil Reinberg (Georgia)	6	6
Alexandre Rotsaert (Stanford)	2	5
9-16	Yuya Ito (Texas)	6	7
John McNally (Ohio State)	3	5
Carlos Divar (Georgia Tech)	2	2
Victor Pham (Columbia)	6	6

Second round
1	N Borges (Mississippi State)	6	6
A Andrade (Florida)	3	4
T Stodder (Tennessee)	7	6
K Smith (UCLA)	6	2
5	B Holt (USC)	6	6
E Reinberg (Georgia)	2	3
9-16	Y Ito (Texas)	6	4	6
V Pham (Columbia)	4	6	4

Third Round
1	N Borges (Mississippi State)	6	6
T Stodder (Tennessee)	0	1
5	B Holt (USC)	2	6	6
9-16	Y Ito (Texas)	6	3	2

Quarterfinals
1	N Borges (Mississippi State)	7	6
5	B Holt (USC)	5	3

==== Section 2 ====
First round
3	Alex Rybakov (TCU)	6	6
Andrew Fenty (Michigan)	3	2
Alexander Bakshi (Oklahoma)	7	6
Jonas Ziverts (Arizona)	6	4
9-16	Nicolas Moreno de Alboran (UCSB)	6	3	6
Hady Habib (Texas A&M)	3	6	7
Ryotaro Matsumura (Kentucky)	3	1
Alex Brown (Illinois)	6	6
8	Oliver Crawford (Florida)	7	6
Govind Nanda (UCLA)	6	3
Joshua Sheehy (Abilene Christian)	5	3
Tanner Smith (USC)	7	6
9-16	William Blumberg (North Carolina)	6	6
Harrison Scott (Texas)	2	3
Matías Soto (Baylor)	5	7	6
Gui Osorio (San Diego)	7	5	0

Second round
3	A Rybakov (TCU)	3	7	6
A Bakshi (Oklahoma)	6	5	2
H Habib (Texas A&M)	6	7	6
A Brown (Illinois)	7	6	3
8	O Crawford (Florida)	6	7
T Smith (USC)	3	5
9-16	W Blumberg (UNC)	6	6
M Soto (Baylor)	1	1

Third Round
3	A Rybakov (TCU)	6	7
H Habib (Texas A&M)	4	5
8	O Crawford (Florida)	6	6
9-16	W Blumberg (UNC)	4	2

Quarterfinals
3	A Rybakov (TCU)	6	3	6
9-16	W Blumberg (UNC)	4	6	2

==== Section 3 ====
First round
Gabriel Decamps (UCF)	6	6	0 (ret.)
Joseph Guillin (UCSB)	3	7	2
Giovanni Oradini (Mississippi State)	6	6
Charlie Broom (Dartmouth)	3	1
Alex Lebedev (Notre Dame)	2	5
Jack Lin (Columbia)	6	7
Juan Aguilar (Texas A&M)	6	6
6	Christian Sigsgaard (Texas)	2	3
Alastair Gray (TCU)	2	4
Kyle Seelig (Ohio State)	6	6
Benjamin Sigouin (North Carolina)	6	4	6
9-16	Alberto Barroso-Campos (South Florida)	2	6	2
Dan Little (Utah)	7	3	6
Mazen Osama (Alabama)	6	6	3
Constant De La Bassetiere (Penn State)	5	2
4	Paul Jubb (South Carolina)	7	6

Second round
J Guillin (UCSB)	3	1
G Oradini (Mississippi State)	6	6
J Lin (Columbia)	7	6
J Aguilar (Texas A&M)	6	2
K Seelig (Ohio State)	3	6	4
B Sigouin (North Carolina)	6	4	6
D Little (Utah)	6	7
4	P Jubb (South Carolina)	4	6

Third Round
G Oradini (Mississippi State)	3	6	6
J Lin (Columbia)	6	4	4
B Sigouin (North Carolina)	1	4
4	P Jubb (South Carolina)	6	6

Quarterfinals
G Oradini (Mississippi State)	6	3
4	P Jubb (South Carolina)	7	6

==== Section 4 ====
First round
Tim Sandkaulen (Ole Miss)	7	7
Lucas Poullain (Florida State)	6	5
Bar Botzer (Wake Forest)	6	6
9-16	Maxime Cressy (UCLA)	4	2
Tim Handel (Northern Arizona)	6	2	2
Ewan Moore (Tulane)	4	6	6
Guanarteme Nuez (UT Arlington)	3	3
7	Aleksandar Kovacevic (Illinois)	6	6
Adam Walton (Tennessee)	5	2
Daniel Cukierman (USC)	7	6
Sam Riffice (Florida)	7	6
9-16	Johannes Schretter (Baylor)	5	2
Sumit Sarkar (Rice)	5	3
Matěj Vocel (Oklahoma State)	7	6
Adrià Soriano Barrera (Miami (FL))	2	3
2	J. J. Wolf (Ohio State)	6	6

Second round
T Sandkaulen (Ole Miss)	6	6	2
B Botzer (Wake Forest)	4	7	6
E Moore (Tulane)	3	5
7	A Kovacevic (Illinois)	6	7
D Cukierman (USC)	3	2
S Riffice (Florida)	6	6
M Vocel (Oklahoma State)	6	2	5
2	J Wolf (Ohio State)	4	6	7

Third Round
B Botzer (Wake Forest)	WD
7	A Kovacevic (Illinois)
S Riffice (Florida)	3	6	6
2	J Wolf (Ohio State)	6	3	2

Quarterfinals
7	A Kovacevic (Illinois)	6	7	6
S Riffice (Florida)	7	6	3

== Women's Singles Championship ==
The women's singles tournament got off to an auspicious start with the third, fourth, and fifth seeds all losing in the first round. The quarterfinals featured six unseeded players, two of which - Duke's Kelly Chen and North Carolina's Cameron Morra (only a freshman at the time) - reached the semifinals. Three of the four semifinalists represented ACC schools.

Estela Pérez-Somarriba of Miami, the nation's top-ranked player entering the tournament, dropped only two sets (including the first set in the championship) en route to winning the title. She became the second Miami woman to be crowned national champion, after Audra Cohen in 2007. Finalist Katarina Jokic was the fifth woman from Georgia to reach the NCAA final and first since 2010.

=== Seeds ===
1. Estela Perez-Somarriba, Miami (FL) (National Champion)
2. Katarina Jokic, Georgia
3. Kate Fahey, Michigan
4. Ingrid Gamarra Martins, South Carolina
5. Makenna Jones, North Carolina
6. Fernanda Contreras, Vanderbilt
7. Alexa Graham, North Carolina
8. Sophie Whittle, Gonzaga

Players ranked 9th–16th, listed by last name (Note: Ida Jarlskog of Florida and Kenya Jones of Georgia Tech were originally named to the list of 9-16 seeds, but withdrew prior to the tournament. They were replaced by Gonzalez and Rosca.)

- Paige Cline, South Carolina
- Marta Gonzalez, Georgia
- Gabriela Knutson, Syracuse
- Maria Mateas, Duke
- Eden Richardson, LSU
- Anna Rogers, NC State
- Christina Rosca, Vanderbilt
- Anastasia Rychagova, Kansas

=== Draw ===
==== Finals ====
Quarterfinals
1	Estela Perez-Somarriba (Miami (FL))	6	6
Asuka Kawai (Illinois)	4	4
Felicity Maltby (Texas Tech)	3	7	3
Cameron Morra (North Carolina)	6	5	6
Kelly Chen (Duke)	6	6
Sara Daavettila (North Carolina)	3	4
Jada Hart (UCLA)	6	4	3
2	Katarina Jokic (Georgia)	4	6	6

Semifinals
1	Estela Perez-Somarriba (Miami (FL))	6	6
Cameron Morra (North Carolina)	3	1
Kelly Chen (Duke)	5	2
2	Katarina Jokic (Georgia)	7	6

Final
1	Estela Perez-Somarriba (Miami (FL))	6^{1}	6	6
2	Katarina Jokic (Georgia)	7^{7}	2	3

==== Section 1 ====
First round
1	Estela Perez-Somarriba (Miami (FL))	6	6
Andie Daniell (Alabama)	0	1
Michaela Haet (Rice)	2	2
Katya Townsend (Texas A&M)	6	6
9-16	Gabriela Knutson (Syracuse)	2	2
Stacey Fung (Washington)	6	6
Melissa Lord (Stanford)	6	3	4
Paola Delgado(VCU)	2	6	6
7	Alexa Graham (North Carolina)	6	5	7
Ellie Douglas (TCU)	2	7	5
Meghan Kelley (Virginia)	3	0
Ashley Lahey (Pepperdine)	6	6
9-16	Maria Mateas (Duke)	6	2	3
Asuka Kawai (Illinois)	3	6	6
Brienne Minor (Michigan)	6	6
Olivia Hauger (California)	1	4

Second round
1	E Perez-Somarriba (Miami (FL))	6	6
K Townsend (Texas A&M)	2	0
S Fung (Washington)	4	5
P Delgado (VCU)	6	7
7	A Graham (North Carolina)	7	6
A Lahey (Pepperdine)	6	4
A Kawai (Illinois)	6	7
B Minor (Michigan)	3	6

Third Round
1	E Perez-Somarriba (Miami (FL))	4	6	7
P Delgado (VCU)	6	0	6
7	A Graham (North Carolina)	5	3
A Kawai (Illinois)	7	6

Quarterfinals
1	E Perez-Somarriba (Miami (FL))	6	6
A Kawai (Illinois)	4	4

==== Section 2 ====
First round
4	Ingrid Gamarra Martins (South Carolina)	3	3
Chiara Lommer (Michigan)	6	6
Petra Melounova (Hawaii)	3	6	7
Jessica Golovin (LSU)	6	3	5
9-16	Christina Rosca (Vanderbilt)	6	7
Felicity Maltby (Texas Tech)	2	5
Aiwen Zhu (UNLV)	6	3	6
Oleksandra Korashvili (Oklahoma)	3	6	3
8	Sophie Whittle (Gonzaga)	2	6
Anna Turati (Texas)	6	7
Elysia Bolton (UCLA)	6	6
McCartney Kessler (Florida)	1	3
9-16	Marta Gonzalez (Georgia)	1	6	6
Salma Ewing (USC)	6	1	4
Cameron Morra (North Carolina)	0	6	6
Silvia Ambrosio (Purdue)	6	2	0

Second round
C Lommer (Michigan)	4	1
P Melounova (Hawaii)	6	6
F Maltby (Texas Tech)	6	7
A Zhu (UNLV)	4	6
A Turati (Texas)	6	3	5
E Bolton (UCLA)	4	6	7
9-16	M Gonzalez (Georgia)	6	2
C Morra (North Carolina)	7	6

Third Round
P Melounova (Hawaii)	5	0
F Maltby (Texas Tech)	7	6
E Bolton (UCLA)	7	6	2
C Morra (North Carolina)	6	7	6

Quarterfinals
F Maltby (Texas Tech)	3	7	3
C Morra (North Carolina)	6	5	6

==== Section 3 ====
First round
Jessica Failla (Pepperdine)	2	4
Kelly Chen (Duke)	6	6
Emma Antonaki (Mississippi State)	3	2
9-16	Anna Rogers (NC State)	6	6
Petra Granic (Texas)	6	6
Iuliia Bryzgalova (Penn)	3	1
Isabelle Boulais (Ohio State)	6	1
6	Fernanda Contreras (Vanderbilt)	7	6
Clarissa Hand (Northwestern)	7	4	6
Emma Davis (Wake Forest)	6	6	4
Solymar Colling (San Diego)	5	6	7
9-16	Eden Richardson (LSU)	7	3	5
Justina Mikulskyte (Kentucky)	3	6	7
Emily Arbuthnott (Stanford)	6	4	5
Sara Daavettila (North Carolina)	6	4	6
3	Kate Fahey (Michigan)	3	6	4

Second round
K Chen (Duke)	7	4	6
9-16	A Rogers (NC State)	5	6	3
P Granic (Texas)	3	4
6	F Contreras (Vanderbilt)	6	6
C Hand (Northwestern)	1	3
S Colling (San Diego)	6	6
J Mikulskyte (Kentucky)	6	4	4
S Daavettila (North Carolina)	4	6	6

Third Round
K Chen (Duke)	4	7	6
6	F Contreras (Vanderbilt)	6	5	2
S Colling (San Diego)	3	3
S Daavettila (North Carolina)	6	6

Quarterfinals
K Chen (Duke)	6	6
S Daavettila (North Carolina)	3	4

==== Section 4 ====
First round
Lauren Proctor (Winthrop)	4	3
Michaela Bayerlová (Washington State)	6	6
Katarina Stresnakova (Oklahoma State)	6	6
9-16	Paige Cline (South Carolina)	2	4
Meible Chi (Duke)	1	1
Jada Hart (UCLA)	6	6
Michaela Gordon (Stanford)	6	6
5	Makenna Jones (North Carolina)	2	1
Julia Rosenqvist (California)	6	6
Valeriya Zeleva (UCF)	0	2
Bianca Mok (Denver)	1	6
9-16	Anastasia Rychagova (Kansas)	6	7
Carla Touly (Florida State)	6	4
Bianca Turarti (Texas)	7	6
Katarina Kozarov (Furman)	5	5
2	Katarina Jokic (Georgia)	7	7

Second round
M Bayerlova (Washington State)	0	2
K Stresnakova (Oklahoma State)	6	6
J Hart (UCLA)	6	6
M Gordon (Stanford)	4	1
J Rosenqvist (California)	4	6	4
9-16	A Rychagova (Kansas)	6	4	6
B Turati (Texas)	6	2
2	K Jokic (Georgia)	7	6

Third Round
K Stresnakova (Oklahoma State)	5	4
J Hart (UCLA)	7	6
9-16	A Rychagova (Kansas)	1	7	3
2	K Jokic (Georgia)	6	6	6

Quarterfinals
J Hart (UCLA)	6	4	3
2	K Jokic (Georgia)	4	6	6

== Men's Doubles Championship ==
=== Seeds ===
1. Jimmy Bendeck / Sven Lah, Baylor
2. Maxime Cressy / Keegan Smith, UCLA (National Champions)
3. Nuno Borges / Strahinja Rakic, Mississippi State
4. Oli Nolan / Henry Patten, UNC Asheville

Players ranked 5th–8th, listed by institution

- Timo Stodder / Preston Touliatos, Tennessee
- Harrison Scott / Christian Sigsgaard, Texas
- Juan Aguilar / Barnaby Smith, Texas A&M
- Cameron Klinger / Billy Rowe, Vanderbilt

=== Draw ===
==== Finals ====
Semifinals
Niclas Braun (Mississippi State); Giovanni Oradini (Mississippi State)	2	5
Patrick Kaukovalta (Alabama); Mazen Osama (Alabama)	6	7
5-8	Timo Stodder (Tennessee); Preston Touliatos (Tennessee)	2	1
2	Maxime Cressy (UCLA); Keegan Smith (UCLA)	6	6

Final
Patrick Kaukovalta (Alabama); Mazen Osama (Alabama)	3	4
2	Maxime Cressy (UCLA); Keegan Smith (UCLA)	6	6

==== Top half ====
First round
1	Jimmy Bendeck (Baylor); Sven Lah (Baylor)	4	7	[11]
Trey Hilderbrand (UCF); Bogdan Pavel (UCF)	6	6	[9]
Brandon Laubser (Auburn); Tad Maclean (Auburn)	6	3	[13]
Bertus Kruger (TCU); Reese Stalder (TCU)	3	6	[11]
5-8	Harrison Scott (Texas); Christian Sigsgaard (Texas)	5	6	[8]
Simen Bratholm (Northwestern); Nick Brookes (Northwestern)	7	2	[10]
Bjorn Thomson (Texas Tech); Parker Wynn (Texas Tech)	6	6	[6]
Niclas Braun (Mississippi State); Giovanni Oradini (Mississippi State)	2	7	[10]
4	Oli Nolan (UNC Asheville); Henry Patten (UNC Asheville)	6	6	[8]
Payton Holden (Princeton); Ryan Seggerman (Princeton)	3	7	[10]
Murkel Dellien (Wichita State); Marius Frosa (Wichita State)	6	6
Alexander Bakshi (Oklahoma); Stefano Tsorotiotis (Oklahoma)	1	4
5-8	Cameron Klinger (Vanderbilt); Billy Rowe (Vanderbilt)	3	4
William Blumberg (North Carolina); Bo Boyden (North Carolina)	6	6
Patrick Kaukovalta (Alabama); Mazen Osama (Alabama)	6	6
Dominik Kellovský (Arizona State); Nathan Ponwith (Arizona State)	2	4

Second round
1	J Bendeck (Baylor); S Lah (Baylor)	7	6
B Laubser (Auburn); T Maclean (Auburn)	6	1
S Bratholm (Northwestern); N Brookes (Northwestern)	4	2
N Braun (Mississippi State); G Oradini (Mississippi State)	6	6
P Holden (Princeton); R Seggerman (Princeton)	6	3	[9]
M Dellien (Wichita State); M Frosa (Wichita State)	4	6	[11]
W Blumberg (North Carolina); B Boyden (North Carolina)	5	2
P Kaukovalta (Alabama); M Osama (Alabama)	7	6

Quarterfinals
1	J Bendeck (Baylor); S Lah (Baylor)	3	4
N Braun (Mississippi State); G Oradini (Mississippi State)	6	6
M Dellien (Wichita State); M Frosa (Wichita State)	3	6
P Kaukovalta (Alabama); M Osama (Alabama)	6	7

Semifinals
N Braun (Mississippi State); G Oradini (Mississippi State)	2	5
P Kaukovalta (Alabama); M Osama (Alabama)	6	6

==== Bottom half ====
First round
Martin Joyce (Ohio State); Hunter Tubert (Ohio State)	3	7	[8]
Nicolas Moreno de Alboran (UCSB); Anders Holm (UCSB)	6	5	[10]
Jack Lin (Columbia); William Matheson (Columbia)	0	6	[10]
5-8	Timo Stodder (Tennessee); Preston Touliatos (Tennessee)	6	4	[12]
Jacob Brumm (California); Yuta Kikuchi (California)	6	7
Wilson Dong (Bryant); Matt Kuhar (Bryant)	4	5
Alastair Gray (TCU); Alex Rybakov (TCU)	4	2
3	Nuno Borges (Mississippi State); Strahinja Rakic (Mississippi State)	6	6
Joel Gamerov (San Diego); August Holmgren (San Diego)	6	6
Richard Ciamarra (Notre Dame); Tristan McCormick (Notre Dame)	2	2
Brandon Holt (USC); Riley Smith (USC)	6	2	[8]
5-8	Juan Aguilar (Texas A&M); Barnaby Smith (Texas A&M)	3	6	[10]
McClain Kessler (Florida); Duarte Vale (Florida)	6	6
Marko Ilic (Belmont); Hendrik Inno (Belmont)	7	7
Aziz Kijametovic (Old Dominion); Francois Musitelli (Old Dominion)	4	4
2	Maxime Cressy (UCLA); Keegan Smith (UCLA)	6	6

Second round
N Moreno de Alboran (UCSB); A Holm (UCSB)	1	6	[5]
5-8	T Stodder (Tennessee); P Touliatos (Tennessee)	6	4	[10]
J Brumm (California); Y Kikuchi (California)	1	2
3	N Borges (Mississippi State); S Rakic (Mississippi State)	6	6
J Gamerov (San Diego); A Holmgren (San Diego)	7	3	[14]
5-8	J Aguilar (Texas A&M); B Smith (Texas A&M)	6	6	[12]
M Ilic (Belmont); H Inno (Belmont)	2	3
2	M Cressy (UCLA); K Smith (UCLA)	6	6

Quarterfinals
5-8	T Stodder (Tennessee); P Touliatos (Tennessee)	6	5	[10]
3	N Borges (Mississippi State); S Rakic (Mississippi State)	4	7	[5]
J Gamerov (San Diego); A Holmgren (San Diego)	6	3
2	M Cressy (UCLA); K Smith (UCLA)	7	6

Semifinals
5-8	T Stodder (Tennessee); P Touliatos (Tennessee)	2	1
2	M Cressy (UCLA); K Smith (UCLA)	6	6

== Women's Doubles Championship ==
=== Seeds ===
1. Angela Kulikov / Rianna Valdes, USC
2. Jessie Aney / Alexa Graham, North Carolina
3. Gabby Andrews / Ayan Broomfield, UCLA (National Champions) (Note: Lauryn John-Baptiste and Ilze Hattingh of Arizona State were originally named the third seed in the tournament, but withdrew prior to the tournament. The UCLA pair was moved up a place; the South Carolina pair became the fourth seed; and Jones and Morra became a 5-8 seed.)
4. Ingrid Gamarra Martins / Mia Horvit, South Carolina

Players ranked 5th–8th, listed by institution

- Nina Khmelnitckaia / Janet Koch, Kansas
- Anna Rogers / Alana Smith, NC State
- Makenna Jones / Cameron Morra, North Carolina
- Sadie Hammond / Kaitlin Staines, Tennessee

=== Draw ===
==== Finals ====
Semifinals
1	Angela Kulikov (USC); Rianna Valdes (USC)	4	4
3	Gabby Andrews (UCLA); Ayan Broomfield (UCLA)	6	6
4	Ingrid Gamarra Martins (South Carolina); Mia Horvit (South Carolina)	2	2
Kate Fahey (Michigan); Brienne Minor (Michigan)	6	6

Final
3	Gabby Andrews (UCLA); Ayan Broomfield (UCLA)	5	7^{7}	[11]
Kate Fahey (Michigan); Brienne Minor (Michigan)	7	6^{6}	[9]

==== Top half ====
First round
1	Angela Kulikov (USC); Rianna Valdes (USC)	6	6
Ellyse Hamlin (Duke); Kaitlyn McCarthy (Duke)	1	3
Graciela Rosas (Gonzaga); Sophie Whittle (Gonzaga)	4	6	[12]
Justina Mikulskyte (Kentucky); Akvile Parazinskaite (Kentucky)	6	4	[10]
5-8	Nina Khmelnitckaia (Kansas); Janet Koch (Kansas)	6	3	[10]
Caroline Lampl (Stanford); Kimberly Yee (Stanford)	2	6	7
Daevenia Achong (Miami); Daniella Roldan (Miami)	6	2
Martina Okalova (Tulsa); Vera Ploner (Tulsa)	7	6
3	Gabby Andrews (UCLA); Ayan Broomfield (UCLA)	6	2	[10]
Victoria Emma (Florida); McCartney Kessler (Florida)	3	6	[7]
Marie Leduc (Clemson); Fernanda Navarro (Clemson)	5	6	[10]
Maria Kononova (North Texas); Tamuna Kutubidze (North Texas)	7	3	[6]
5-8	Makenna Jones (North Carolina); Cameron Morra (North Carolina)	6	5	[10]
Jessica Golovin (LSU); Eden Richardson (LSU)	2	7	[4]
Ksenia Kuznetsova (UCF); Valeriya Zeleva (UCF)	7	4	[10]
Hind Abdelouahid (Saint Mary's); Mariia Kozyreva (Saint Mary's)	6	6	[6]

Second round
1	A Kulikov (USC); R Valdes (USC)	6	6
G Rosas (Gonzaga); S Whittle (Gonzaga)	1	4
5-8	N Khmelnitckaia (Kansas); J Koch (Kansas)	6	7	[3]
M Okalova (Tulsa); V Ploner (Tulsa)	7	6	[10]
3	G Andrews (UCLA); A Broomfield (UCLA)	7	7
M Leduc (Clemson); F Navarro (Clemson)	6	6
5-8	M Jones (North Carolina); C Morra (North Carolina)	7	7
K Kuznetsova (UCF); V Zeleva (UCF)	5	6

Quarterfinals
1	A Kulikov (USC); R Valdes (USC)	6	6
M Okalova (Tulsa); V Ploner (Tulsa)	1	2
3	G Andrews (UCLA); A Broomfield (UCLA)	6	6	[10]
5-8	M Jones (North Carolina); C Morra (North Carolina)	7	1	[7]

Semifinals
1	A Kulikov (USC); R Valdes (USC)	4	4
3	G Andrews (UCLA); A Broomfield (UCLA)	6	6

==== Bottom half ====
First round
Maria Bellucco (Wichita State); Fatima Bizhukova (Wichita State)	1	1
Sofia Blanco (Oklahoma State); Catherine Gulihur (Oklahoma State)	6	6
Hana Mraz (California); Julia Rosenqvist (California)	7	3	[8]
5-8	Anna Rogers (NC State); Alana Smith (NC State)	6	6	[10]
Megan Kauffman (Winthrop); Lauren Proctor (Winthrop)	1	7	[10]
Tiffany Mylonas (Washington State); Hikaru Sato (Washington State)	6	5	[5]
Ana Oparenovic (Florida State); Emmanuelle Salas (Florida State)	1	4
4	Ingrid Gamarra Martins (South Carolina); Mia Horvit (South Carolina)	6	6
Meghan Kelley (Virginia); Sofia Munera (Virginia)	1	2
Kate Fahey (Michigan); Brienne Minor (Michigan)	6	6
Elysia Bolton (UCLA); Jada Hart (UCLA)	7	6
5-8	Sadie Hammond (Tennessee); Kaitlin Staines (Tennessee)	6	1
Lourdes Carle (Georgia); Katarina Jokic (Georgia)	6	6
Stacey Fung (Washington); Nika Zupancic (Washington)	4	1
Emily Arbuthnott (Stanford); Michaela Gordon (Stanford)	2	4
2	Jessie Aney (North Carolina); Alexa Graham (North Carolina)	6	6

Second round
S Blanco (Oklahoma State); C Gulihur (Oklahoma State)	4	0
5-8	A Rogers (NC State); A Smith (NC State)	6	6
T Mylonas (Washington State); H Sato (Washington State)	3	3
4	I Gamarra Martins (South Carolina); M Horvit (South Carolina)	6	6
K Fahey (Michigan); B Minor (Michigan)	6	7
E Bolton (UCLA); J Hart (UCLA)	2	6
L Carle (Georgia); K Jokic (Georgia)	6	6
2	J Aney (North Carolina); A Graham (North Carolina)	1	3

Quarterfinals
5-8	A Rogers (NC State); A Smith (NC State)	5	4
4	I Gamarra Martins (South Carolina); M Horvit (South Carolina)	7	6
K Fahey (Michigan); B Minor (Michigan)	6	6
L Carle (Georgia); K Jokic (Georgia)	2	2

Semifinals
4	I Gamarra Martins (South Carolina); M Horvit (South Carolina)	2	2
K Fahey (Michigan); B Minor (Michigan)	6	6
