= 2017 NCAA Division I Tennis Championships =

- Date: May 18–29, 2017
- Edition: 72nd (Men), 36th (Women)
- Location: Athens, Georgia, United States
- Venue: Dan Magill Tennis Complex (University of Georgia)
- NCAA Division I Tennis Championships

The 2017 NCAA Division I Tennis Championships was the men's and women's tennis tournaments played concurrently from May 18 to May 29, 2017 in Athens, Georgia at the Dan Magill Tennis Complex on the campus of the University of Georgia. It was the 72nd edition of the NCAA Division I Men's Tennis Championship* and the 36th edition of the NCAA Division I Women's Tennis Championship.* It was the 12th time that the men's and women's tournaments were held at the same venue. It consisted of a men's and women's team, singles, and doubles championships.

== Men's team championship ==
=== National seeds ===
1. Wake Forest (Quarterfinal)
2. Virginia (National Champions)
3. Ohio State (semifinal)
4. USC (round of 16)
5. UCLA (quarterfinals)
6. TCU (quarterfinals)
7. Baylor (round of 16)
8. California (round of 16) 9. North Carolina (Runner-up)
10. Texas (quarterfinals)
11. Oklahoma State (second round)
12. Texas A&M (round of 16)
13. Georgia (semifinals)
14. Oklahoma (round of 16)
15. Florida (round of 16)
16. Stanford (round of 16)

=== Bracket ===
==== Top half ====
===== Section 1 =====
First Round; May 12, 2017; National Seed Home Court
1	Wake Forest	4
49*	UNCW	0
Winston-Salem
17*	Kentucky	4
33*	Georgia St.	0
17*	Michigan	4
33*	Valparaiso	0
Stanford
49*	Idaho	0
16	Stanford	4
9	North Carolina	4
49*	VCU	0
Chapel Hill
17*	South Carolina	5
33*	ETSU	0
17*	Northwestern	4
33*	Utah St.	2
Berkeley
49*	Tennessee Tech	0
8	California	4

Second Round; May 13, 2017; National Seed Home Court
1	Wake Forest	4
17*	Kentucky	2
17*	Michigan	1
16	Stanford	4
9	North Carolina	4
17*	South Carolina	1
17*	Northwestern	1
8	California	4

Round of 16; May 18, 2017; Athens, GA
1	Wake Forest	4
16	Stanford	0
9	North Carolina	4
8	California	1

Quarterfinals; May 20, 2017; Athens, GA
1	Wake Forest	2
9	North Carolina	4

===== Section 2 =====
First Round; May 12, 2017; National Seed Home Court
5	UCLA	4
49*	Army West Point	0
Los Angeles
17*	Ole Miss	4
33*	UC Santa Barbara	1
17*	Oregon	4
33*	Memphis	2
College Station
49*	Buffalo	0
12	Texas A&M	4
13	Georgia	4
49*	Florida A&M	0
Athens
17*	South Fla.	4
33*	Duke	0
17*	Wisconsin	4
33*	San Diego	1
Los Angeles
49*	Denver	0
4	Southern California	4

Second Round; May 13, 2017; National Seed Home Court
5	UCLA	4
17*	Ole Miss	0
17*	Oregon	0
12	Texas A&M	4
13	Georgia	4
17*	South Florida	1
17*	Wisconsin	1
4	Southern California	4

Round of 16; May 18, 2017; Athens, GA
5	UCLA	4
12	Texas A&M	1
13	Georgia	4
4	USC	3

Quarterfinals; May 20, 2017; Athens, GA
5	UCLA	2
13	Georgia	4

==== Bottom half ====
===== Section 3 =====
First Round; May 12, 2017; National Seed Home Court
3	Ohio St.	4
49*	Butler	0
Columbus
17*	UCF	3
33*	Louisville	4
17*	Mississippi St.	4
33*	SMU	0
Norman
49*	Bryant	0
14	Oklahoma	4
11	Oklahoma St.	4
49*	UMKC	0
Stillwater
17*	Illinois	4
33*	Drake	0
17*	Florida St.	4
33*	Arkansas	1
Fort Worth
49*	Jackson St.	0
6	TCU	4

Second Round; May 13, 2017; National Seed Home Court
3	Ohio St.	4
33*	Louisville	0
17*	Mississippi St.	1
14	Oklahoma	4
11	Oklahoma St.	3
17*	Illinois	4
17*	Florida St.	1
6	TCU	4

Round of 16; May 18, 2017; Athens, GA
3	Ohio St.	4
14	Oklahoma	3
17*	Illinois	1
6	TCU	4

Quarterfinals; May 20, 2017; Athens, GA
3	Ohio St.	4
6	TCU	3

===== Section 4 =====
First Round; May 12, 2017; National Seed Home Court
7	Baylor	4
49*	Lamar University	0
Waco
17*	Cornell	4
33*	Rice	0
17*	Tulane	4
33*	Washington	2
Austin
49*	Presbyterian	0
10	Texas	4
15	Florida	4
49*	FGCU	0
Gainesville
17*	Georgia Tech	4
33*	Minnesota	1
17*	Columbia	4
33*	Purdue	2
Charlottesville
49*	Monmouth	0
2	Virginia	4

Second Round; May 13, 2017; National Seed Home Court
7	Baylor	4
17*	Cornell	0
17*	Tulane	3
10	Texas	4
15	Florida	4
17*	Georgia Tech	0
17*	Columbia	0
2	Virginia	4

Round of 16; May 18, 2017; Athens, GA
7	Baylor	1
10	Texas	4
15	Florida	0
2	Virginia	4

Quarterfinals; May 20, 2017; Athens, GA
10	Texas	1
2	Virginia	4

==== Finals ====
Semifinals; May 22, 2017
9	North Carolina	4
13	Georgia	3
3	Ohio St.	2
2	Virginia	4

Final; May 23, 2017
9	North Carolina	2
2	Virginia	4

== Women's team championship ==
=== National seeds ===
1. Florida (National Champions)
2. North Carolina (quarterfinals)
3. Ohio State (semifinals)
4. Vanderbilt (semifinals)

5. Georgia (round of 16)
6. Texas Tech (quarterfinals)
7. Stanford (Runner-up)
8. Georgia Tech (round of 16)

9. Oklahoma State (quarterfinals)
10. Michigan (round of 16)
11. Auburn (round of 16)
12. Pepperdine (quarterfinals)

13. California (round of 16)
14. South Carolina (round of 16)
15. Duke (round of 16)
16. Baylor (second round)

=== Bracket ===
==== Top half ====
===== Section 1 =====
First Round; May 12–13, 2017; National Seed Home Court
1	Florida	4
49*	Massachusetts	0
Gainesville – Sat/Sun
17*	Miami (FL)	4
33*	South Florida	0
17*	Texas A&M	4
33*	La.–Monroe	2
Waco – Sat/Sun
49*	A&M-Corpus Christi	0
16	Baylor	4
9	Oklahoma St.	4
49*	UMKC	0
Stillwater – Sat/Sun
17*	Arkansas	4
33*	Wichita St.	2
17*	Mississippi St.	1
33*	Northwestern	4
Atlanta – Sat/Sun
49*	Alabama St.	0
8	Georgia Tech	4

Second Round; May 13–14, 2017; National Seed Home Court
1	Florida	4
17*	Miami (FL)	1
17*	Texas A&M	4
16	Baylor	3
9	Oklahoma St.	4
17*	Arkansas	0
33*	Northwestern	0
8	Georgia Tech	4

Round of 16; May 19, 2017; Athens, GA
1	Florida	4
17*	Texas A&M	0
9	Oklahoma St.	4
8	Georgia Tech	3

Quarterfinals; May 21, 2017; Athens, GA
1	Florida	4
9	Oklahoma St.	1

===== Section 2 =====
First Round; May 12–13, 2017; National Seed Home Court
5	Georgia	4
49*	South Carolina St.	0
Athens – Sat/Sun
17*	North Carolina St.	4
33*	Oregon	2
17*	UCLA	4
33*	UC Santa Barbara	0
Malibu – Fri/Sat
49*	LIU Brooklyn	0
12	Pepperdine	4
13	California	4
49*	San Jose St.	0
Berkeley – Sat/Sun
17*	LSU	4
33*	Tulsa	3
17*	Washington	2
33*	Clemson	4
Nashville – Fri/Sat
49*	SIUE	0
4	Vanderbilt	4

Second Round; May 13–14, 2017; National Seed Home Court
5	Georgia	4
17*	North Carolina St.	0
17*	UCLA	1
12	Pepperdine	4
13	California	4
17*	LSU	0
33*	Clemson	1
4	Vanderbilt	4

Round of 16; May 19, 2017; Athens, GA
5	Georgia	3
12	Pepperdine	4
13	California	1
4	Vanderbilt	4

Quarterfinals; May 21, 2017; Athens, GA
12	Pepperdine	2
4	Vanderbilt	4

==== Bottom half ====
===== Section 3 =====
First Round; May 12–13, 2017; National Seed Home Court
3	Ohio St.	4
49*	Buffalo	0
Columbus – Sat/Sun
17*	Notre Dame	4
33*	Kansas	3
17*	Texas	4
33*	Wake Forest	3
Columbia – Fri/Sat
49*	North Florida	0
14	South Carolina	4
11	Auburn	4
49*	DePaul	0
Auburn – Fri/Sat
17*	Arizona St.	2
33*	Florida St.	4
17*	Southern California	2
33*	Denver	4
Lubbock – Fri/Sat
49*	Quinnipiac	0
6	Texas Tech	4

Second Round; May 13–14, 2017; National Seed Home Court
3	Ohio St.	4
17*	Notre Dame	0
17*	Texas	3
14	South Carolina	4
11	Auburn	4
33*	Florida St.	2
33*	Denver	1
6	Texas Tech	4

Round of 16; May 19, 2017; Athens, GA
3	Ohio St.	4
14	South Carolina	1
11	Auburn	2
6	Texas Tech	4

Quarterfinals; May 21, 2017; Athens, GA
3	Ohio St.	4
6	Texas Tech	0

===== Section 4 =====
First Round; May 12–13, 2017; National Seed Home Court
7	Stanford	4
49*	Idaho	0
Stanford – Sat/Sun
17*	TCU	4
33*	Rice	0
17*	Kentucky	4
33*	Dartmouth	2
Ann Arbor – Fri/Sat
49*	Youngstown St.	0
10	Michigan	4
15	Duke	4
49*	Boston U.	0
Durham – Fri/Sat
17*	Tennessee	4
33*	Winthrop	1
17*	Ole Miss	4
33*	William & Mary	1
Chapel Hill – Sat/Sun
49*	Furman	0
2	North Carolina	4

Second Round; May 13–14, 2017; National Seed Home Court
7	Stanford	4
17*	TCU	2
17*	Kentucky	2
10	Michigan	4
15	Duke	4
17*	Tennessee	1
17*	Ole Miss	1
2	North Carolina	4

Round of 16; May 19, 2017; Athens, GA
7	Stanford	4
10	Michigan	1
15	Duke	0
2	North Carolina	4

Quarterfinals; May 21, 2017; Athens, GA
7	Stanford	4
2	North Carolina	2

==== Finals ====
Semifinals; May 22, 2017
1	Florida	4
4	Vanderbilt	2
3	Ohio St.	3
7	Stanford	4

Final; May 23, 2017
1	Florida	4
7	Stanford	1

== Men's singles championship ==
=== National seeds ===
1. Mikael Torpegaard, Ohio State (round of 16)
2. Nuno Borges, Mississippi State (semifinals)
3. Petros Chrysochos, Wake Forest (round of 16)
4. Arthur Rinderknech, Texas A&M (round of 64)
5. Christopher Eubanks, Georgia Tech (quarterfinals)
6. Alfredo Perez, Florida (round of 16)
7. Hugo Di Feo, Ohio State (round of 64)
8. Tom Fawcett, Stanford (semifinals)

Players ranked 9th–16th, listed by last name

- Juan Benitez, Baylor (round of 64)
- William Blumberg, North Carolina (final)
- William Bushamuka, Kentucky (Round of 16)
- Thai-Son Kwiatkowski, Virginia (National Champion)
- Florian Lakat, California (round of 16)
- Skander Mansouri, Wake Forest (quarterfinals)
- Michael Redlicki, Arkansas (round of 32)
- Constantin Schmitz, Tulane (round of 64)

=== Bracket ===
==== Finals ====
Quarterfinals; May 27, 2017
9-16	Thai-Son Kwiatkowski (Virginia)	6	6
5	Christopher Eubanks (Georgia Tech)	3	1
Alex Ghilea (Oklahoma)	2	2
8	Tom Fawcett (Stanford)	6	6
9-16	William Blumberg (North Carolina)	6	6
Jack Findel-Hawkins (North Florida)	4	4
9-16	Skander Mansouri (Wake Forest)	6^{2}	3
2	Nuno Borges (Mississippi St.)	7^{7}	6

Semifinals; May 28, 2017
9-16	Thai-Son Kwiatkowski (Virginia)	6	6
8	Tom Fawcett (Stanford)	3	2
9-16	William Blumberg (North Carolina)	6	7^{7}
2	Nuno Borges (Mississippi St.)	2	6^{1}

Final; May 29, 2017
9-16	Thai-Son Kwiatkowski (Virginia)	6	7^{7}
9-16	William Blumberg (North Carolina)	4	6^{5}

==== Top half ====
===== Section 1 =====
Round of 64; May 24, 2017
1	M Torpegaard (Ohio St.)	7	6
T Laurent (Oregon)	5	2
R Matsumura (Kentucky)	6	6^{4}	6^{4}
K Lovett (UCF)	2	7^{7}	7^{7}
9-16	T-S Kwiatkowski (Virginia)	6	6
J Cash (Oklahoma St.)	4	4
V Pham (Columbia)	6	3	2
D Vincent (Vanderbilt)	4	6	6
5	C Eubanks (Georgia Tech)	6	7
Ma Redlicki (UCLA)	3	5
J Daigle (LSU)	3	4
O Ram-Harel (Tulsa)	6	6
9-16	Mi Redlicki (Arkansas)	2	6	6
J Schretter (Baylor)	6	4	3
A Dougaz (Florida St.)	3	4
Y Ito (Texas)	6	6

Round of 32; May 25, 2017
1	M Torpegaard (Ohio St.)	6	6
K Lovett (UCF)	1	1
9-16	T-S Kwiatkowski (Virginia)	6	6
D Vincent (Vanderbilt)	2	2
5	C Eubanks (Georgia Tech)	6	7
O Ram-Harel (Tulsa)	4	5
9-16	Mi Redlicki (Arkansas)	6	3	5
Y Ito (Texas)	2	6	7

Round of 16; May 26, 2017
1	M Torpegaard (Ohio St.)	1	6^{3}
9-16	T-S Kwiatkowski (Virginia)	6	7^{7}
5	C Eubanks (Georgia Tech)	6	6
Y Ito (Texas)	3	0

Quarterfinals; May 27, 2017
9-16	T-S Kwiatkowski (Virginia)	6	6
5	C Eubanks (Georgia Tech)	3	1

===== Section 2 =====
Round of 64; May 24, 2017
3	P Chrysochos (Wake Forest)	6	6
T Lu (Yale)	4	3
S Kirchheimer (Northwestern)	7	5	6
G Friedrich (South Carolina)	5	7	4
9-16	C Schmitz (Tulane)	0	0
A Ghilea (Oklahoma)	6	6
R Grigorescu (Omaha)	4	6	6^{4}
H Scott (Texas)	6	2	7^{6}
8	T Fawcett (Stanford)	6	7
W Montgomery (Georgia)	1	6
E Mena (Tennessee Tech)	6	7^{8}
M Tchoutakian (Baylor)	4	6^{6}
9-16	F Lakat (California)	6	6
R Schneider (North Carolina)	4	3
J Arconada (Texas A&M)	5
F Vittek (San Diego)	1^{r}

Round of 32; May 25, 2017
3	P Chrysochos (Wake Forest)	6	6
S Kirchheimer (Northwestern)	4	2
A Ghilea (Oklahoma)	6	6
H Scott (Texas)	4	4
8	T Fawcett (Stanford)	6	6
E Mena (Tennessee Tech)	0	1
9-16	F Lakat (California)	6	6
J Arconada (Texas A&M)	4	3

Round of 16; May 26, 2017
3	P Chrysochos (Wake Forest)	6^{5}	5
A Ghilea (Oklahoma)	7^{7}	7
8	T Fawcett (Stanford)	7	7
9-16	F Lakat (California)	5	5

Quarterfinals; May 27, 2017
A Ghilea (Oklahoma)	2	2
8	T Fawcett (Stanford)	6	6

==== Bottom half ====
===== Section 3 =====
Round of 64; May 24, 2017
A Göransson (California)	6	6
H O'Keefe (South Carolina)	2	2
J. J. Wolf (Ohio St.)	3	6	3
9-16	W Blumberg (North Carolina)	6	1	6
T Stodder (Tennessee)	3	6	2
A Rybakov (TCU)	6	4	6
A Hiltzik (Illinois)	4	1
6	A Perez (Florida)	6	6
C Sigsgaard (Texas)	1	6^{5}
S Gozun (South Fla.)	6	7^{7}
J Findel-Hawkins (North Florida)	7^{7}	6
9-16	J Benitez (Baylor)	6^{4}	4
P Baranski (Southern Illinois)	6	4	6^{3}
N Ponwith (Georgia)	2	6	7^{7}
B Gojo (Wake Forest)	2	6	6
4	A Rinderknech (Texas A&M)	6	4	3

Round of 32; May 25, 2017
A Göransson (California)	5	2
9-16	W Blumberg (North Carolina)	7	6
A Rybakov (TCU)	3	7	4
6	A Perez (Florida)	6	5	6
S Gozun (South Fla.)	6	2	4
J Findel-Hawkins (North Florida)	0	6	6
N Ponwith (Georgia)	3	2
B Gojo (Wake Forest)	6	6

Round of 16; May 26, 2017
9-16	W Blumberg (North Carolina)	5	6	6
6	A Perez (Florida)	7	4	3
J Findel-Hawkins (North Florida)	6	2	6
B Gojo (Wake Forest)	3	6	0

Quarterfinals; May 27, 2017
9-16	W Blumberg (North Carolina)	6	6
J Findel-Hawkins (North Florida)	4	4

===== Section 4 =====
Round of 64; May 24, 2017
D Biosca (ETSU)	6	3	6
C Altamirano (Virginia)	4	6	3
J Salazar (Arkansas)	4	4
9-16	S Mansouri (Wake Forest)	6	6
J Cailleau (Texas Tech)	7	1	6
B Holt (Southern California)	5	6	2
E Reinberg (Georgia)	6	6^{1}	6
7	H Di Feo (Ohio St.)	3	7^{7}	3
G Hansson (Ole Miss)	6	6
S Papa (Oklahoma)	4	2
T Jacobs (South Ala.)	6^{5}	6^{7}
9-16	W Bushamuka (Kentucky)	7^{7}	7^{9}
K Zieba (Northwestern)	6	3	6^{3}
J Hagar (Notre Dame)	4	6	7^{7}
A Moundir (Old Dominion)	3	5
2	N Borges (Mississippi St.)	6	7

Round of 32; May 25, 2017
D Biosca (ETSU)	4	7^{8}	6^{1}
9-16	S Mansouri (Wake Forest)	6	6^{6}	7^{7}
J Cailleau (Texas Tech)	4	7	7
E Reinberg (Georgia)	6	5	5
G Hansson (Ole Miss)	6	2	1
9-16	W Bushamuka (Kentucky)	2	6	6
J Hagar (Notre Dame)	2	4
2	N Borges (Mississippi St.)	6	6

Round of 16; May 26, 2017
9-16	S Mansouri (Wake Forest)	6	3	6
J Cailleau (Texas Tech)	1	6	4
9-16	W Bushamuka (Kentucky)	4	6	2
2	N Borges (Mississippi St.)	6	4	6

Quarterfinals; May 27, 2017
9-16	S Mansouri (Wake Forest)	6^{2}	3
2	N Borges (Mississippi St.)	7^{7}	6

== Women's singles championship ==
=== National seeds ===
1. Francesca Di Lorenzo, Ohio State (round of 64)
2. Hayley Carter, North Carolina (round of 64)
3. Astra Sharma, Vanderbilt (withdrew)
4. Ena Shibahara, UCLA (round of 16)
5. Blair Shankle, Baylor (round of 16)
6. Belinda Woolcock, Florida (finals)
7. Jasmine Lee, Mississippi State (round of 64)
8. Viktoriya Lushkova, Oklahoma State (round of 32)

Players ranked 9th–16th, listed by last name

- Sydney Campbell, Vanderbilt (semifinals)
- Jade Lewis, LSU (round of 32)
- Ellen Perez, Georgia (round of 16)
- Rachel Pierson, Texas A&M (round of 64)
- Karla Popovic, California (round of 16)
- Erin Routliffe, Alabama (round of 64)
- Luisa Stefani, Pepperdine (round of 64)
- Gabriela Talabă, Texas Tech (round of 32)

==== Finals ====
Quarterfinals; May 27, 2017
Brienne Minor (Michigan)	6	6
Sara Daavettila (North Carolina)	2	4
9-16	Sydney Campbell (Vanderbilt)	3	6	6
Ashley Lahey (Pepperdine)	6	4	2
Kate Fahey (Michigan)	4	3
Estela Perez-Somarriba (Miami (FL))	6	6
6	Belinda Woolcock (Florida)	4	6	6
Anna Danilina (Florida)	6	3	4

Semifinals; May 28, 2017
Brienne Minor (Michigan)	6^{5}	7	6
9-16	Sydney Campbell (Vanderbilt)	7^{7}	5	0
Estela Perez-Somarriba (Miami (FL))	1	7	3
6	Belinda Woolcock (Florida)	6	5	6

Final; May 29, 2017
Brienne Minor (Michigan)	6	6
6	Belinda Woolcock (Florida)	3	3

==== Top half ====
===== Section 1 =====
Round of 64; May 24, 2017
1	F Di Lorenzo (Ohio St.)	4	2
M Sherif Ahmed (Pepperdine)	6	6
B Turati (Texas)	1	0
J Kuhlman (Florida)	6	6
9-16	G Talabă (Texas Tech)	6	6
A Michaud (Auburn)	2	1
S Lohan (Miami (FL))	6	3	3
B Minor (Michigan)	3	6	6
7	J Lee (Mississippi St.)	4	1
J Failla (Southern California)	6	6
K Shaffer (Georgia)	5	3
S Daavettila (North Carolina)	7	6
9-16	K Popovic (California)	6	6
K Adamovic (Oklahoma St.)	4	0
I Gamarra Martins (South Carolina)	6	6
V Babić (Oklahoma St.)	1	4

Round of 32; May 25, 2017
M Sherif Ahmed (Pepperdine)	6	7
J Kuhlman (Florida)	4	5
9-16	G Talabă (Texas Tech)	4	2
B Minor (Michigan)	6	6
J Failla (Southern California)	3	2
S Daavettila (North Carolina)	6	6
9-16	K Popovic (California)	6	6
I Gamarra Martins (South Carolina)	0	3

Round of 16; May 26, 2017
M Sherif Ahmed (Pepperdine)	3	5
B Minor (Michigan)	6	7
S Daavettila (North Carolina)	3	6	6
9-16	K Popovic (California)	6	4	1

Quarterfinals; May 27, 2017
B Minor (Michigan)	6	6
S Daavettila (North Carolina)	2	4

===== Section 2 =====
Round of 64; May 24, 2017
4	E Shibahara (UCLA)	6	6
R Bhosale (Texas A&M)	4	2
E Christofi (Georgia)	5	6^{8}
L Marker (Arizona)	7	7^{10}
9-16	S Campbell (Vanderbilt)	6	6
R McAdoo (Georgia Tech)	2	3
S Hudson (Arkansas)	6	6
C Doyle (Stanford)	3	1
5	B Shankle (Baylor)	6	6
B Lindl (Tennessee)	2	4
A Sutjiadi (Kentucky)	5	3
K Daniel (Penn)	7	6
9-16	J Lewis (LSU)	6	2	6
C Scholl (Duke)	4	6	4
A Lahey (Pepperdine)	6	6
I Neel (Florida)	2	4

Round of 32; May 25, 2017
4	E Shibahara (UCLA)	6	7
L Marker (Arizona)	3	5
9-16	S Campbell (Vanderbilt)	6	7^{7}
S Hudson (Arkansas)	4	6^{1}
5	B Shankle (Baylor)	6	6
K Daniel (Penn)	3	4
9-16	J Lewis (LSU)	6^{2}	7	5
A Lahey (Pepperdine)	7^{7}	5	7

Round of 16; May 26, 2017
4	E Shibahara (UCLA)	2	4
9-16	S Campbell (Vanderbilt)	6	6
5	B Shankle (Baylor)	6	0	4
A Lahey (Pepperdine)	4	6	6

Quarterfinals; May 27, 2017
9-16	S Campbell (Vanderbilt)	3	6	6
A Lahey (Pepperdine)	6	4	2

==== Bottom half ====
===== Section 3 =====
Round of 64; May 24, 2017
G Smith (Southern California)	6	6
A Dikosavljevic (Auburn)	3	3
J Livianu (St. John's (NY))	7^{7}	6
9-16	L Stefani (Pepperdine)	6^{4}	4
J Aney (North Carolina)	1	3
K Fahey (Michigan)	6	6
K Keegan (Florida)	1	3
8	V Lushkova (Oklahoma St.)	6	6
M Horvit (South Carolina)	4	6	6
I Markesini (ETSU)	6	0	2
M Chi (Duke)	6	6
9-16	E Routliffe (Alabama)	2	3
M Manasse (California)	2	3
A Hartono (Ole Miss)	6	6
E Perez-Somarriba (Miami (FL))	1	6	6
A Oparenovic (Arkansas)	6	1	1

Round of 32; May 25, 2017
G Smith (Southern California)	1	3
J Livianu (St. John's (NY))	6	6
K Fahey (Michigan)	6	6
8	V Lushkova (Oklahoma St.)	3	0
M Horvit (South Carolina)	6	6
M Chi (Duke)	4	1
A Hartono (Ole Miss)	4	3
E Perez-Somarriba (Miami (FL))	6	6

Round of 16; May 26, 2017
J Livianu (St. John's (NY))	6	5	3
K Fahey (Michigan)	1	7	6
M Horvit (South Carolina)	4	7	1
E Perez-Somarriba (Miami (FL))	6	5	6

Quarterfinals; May 27, 2017
K Fahey (Michigan)	4	3
E Perez-Somarriba (Miami (FL))	6	6

===== Section 4 =====
Round of 64; May 24, 2017
L Miyazaki (Oklahoma)	3	2
J Valle Costa (LSU)	6	6
P Melounova (Hawaii)	7^{7}	6
9-16	R Pierson (Texas A&M)	6^{5}	3
M Lord (Stanford)	2	6	6
J Renaud (Georgia Tech)	6	4	0
A Lazaro (FIU)	3	2
6	B Woolcock (Florida)	6	6
C Zi Yang (UNLV)	6^{4}	2
S Fung (Washington)	7^{7}	6
K Guerin (Wake Forest)	3	3
9-16	E Perez (Georgia)	6	6
K Jump (Arizona St.)	4	2
F Maltby (Texas Tech)	6	6
A Danilina (Florida)	6	6
2	H Carter (North Carolina)	2	3

Round of 32; May 25, 2017
J Valle Costa (LSU)	6	6
P Melounova (Hawaii)	3	2
M Lord (Stanford)	3	4
6	B Woolcock (Florida)	6	6
S Fung (Washington)	5	3
9-16	E Perez (Georgia)	7	6
F Maltby (Texas Tech)	1	1
A Danilina (Florida)	6	6

Round of 16; May 26, 2017
J Valle Costa (LSU)	3	1
6	B Woolcock (Florida)	6	6
9-16	E Perez (Georgia)	4	6^{3}
A Danilina (Florida)	6	7^{7}

Quarterfinals; May 27, 2017
6	B Woolcock (Florida)	4	6	6
A Danilina (Florida)	6	3	4

== Men's doubles championship ==
=== National seeds ===
1. Robert Loeb/Jan Zieliński, Georgia (finals)
2. Martin Redlicki/Evan Zhu, UCLA (quarterfinals)
3. Johannes Ingildsen/Alfredo Perez, Florida (quarterfinals)
4. Skander Mansouri/Christian Seraphim, Wake Forest (semifinals)

Teams seeded 5th–8th in no particular order

- AJ Catanzariti/Arthur Rinderknech, Texas A&M (round of 32)
- Filip Bergevi/Florian Lakat, California (round of 16)
- Julian Cash/Arjun Kadhe, Oklahoma St. (round of 16)
- Mike Redlicki/Jose Salazar, Arkansas (round of 16)

=== Bracket ===
==== Finals ====
Semifinals; May 28, 2017
1	Robert Loeb (Georgia); Jan Zieliński (Georgia)	6	7^{7}
Jerry Lopez (TCU); Reese Stalder (TCU)	3	6^{4}
4	Skander Mansouri (Wake Forest); Christian Seraphim (Wake Forest)	6	3	[10]
Andrew Harris (Oklahoma); Spencer Papa (Oklahoma)	4	6	[12]

Finals; May 29, 2017
1	Robert Loeb (Georgia); Jan Zieliński (Georgia)	6	2	[6]
Andrew Harris (Oklahoma); Spencer Papa (Oklahoma)	4	6	[10]

==== Top half ====
Round of 32; May 25, 2017
1	R Loeb (Georgia); J Zieliński (Georgia)	4	7	[10]
H Di Feo (Ohio St.); M Joyce (Ohio St.)	6	5	[1]
Y Dennis (South Carolina); H O'Keefe (South Carolina)	6^{3}	1
J Findel-Hawkins (North Florida); L Muscheites (North Florida)	7	6
5-8	A Catanzariti (Texas A&M); A Rinderknech (Texas A&M)	6^{5}	7^{13}	[9]
C Emhardt (Valparaiso); J Schorsch (Valparaiso)	7^{7}	6^{11}	[11]
F Fallert (Ole Miss); G Hamilton (Ole Miss)	6	6
M Dragos (Butler); M Khmiadashvili (Butler)	4	3
3	J Ingildsen (Florida); A Perez (Florida)	4	6	[10]
S Freund (UC Santa Barbara); M Mays (UC Santa Barbara)	6	3	[7]
T Bennett (Rice); D Warren (Rice)	3	2
J Benitez (Baylor); W Little (Baylor)	6	6
5-8	F Bergevi (California); F Lakat (California)	6	6
S Furman (Duke); N Stachowiak (Duke)	2	4
J Lopez (TCU); R Stalder (TCU)	6	3	[10]
C Johnston (Michigan); J Malik (Michigan)	3	6	[8]

Round of 16; May 26, 2017
1	R Loeb (Georgia); J Zieliński (Georgia)	7	6
J Findel-Hawkins (North Florida); L Muscheites (North Florida)	5	4
C Emhardt (Valparaiso); J Schorsch (Valparaiso)	6	6
F Fallert (Ole Miss); G Hamilton (Ole Miss)	3	4
3	J Ingildsen (Florida); A Perez (Florida)	6^{4}	6	[10]
J Benitez (Baylor); W Little (Baylor)	7^{7}	2	[8]
5-8	F Bergevi (California); F Lakat (California)	3	4
J Lopez (TCU); R Stalder (TCU)	6	6

Quarterfinals; May 27, 2017
1	R Loeb (Georgia); J Zieliński (Georgia)	6	5	[11]
C Emhardt (Valparaiso); J Schorsch (Valparaiso)	3	7	[9]
3	J Ingildsen (Florida); A Perez (Florida)	4	5
J Lopez (TCU); R Stalder (TCU)	6	7

Semifinals; May 28, 2017
1	R Loeb (Georgia); J Zieliński (Georgia)	6	7^{7}
J Lopez (TCU); R Stalder (TCU)	3	6^{4}

==== Bottom half ====
Round of 32; May 25, 2017
J Butsch (LSU); J Daigle (LSU)	6^{4}	5
W Blumberg (North Carolina); R Kelly (North Carolina)	7^{7}	7
B Holt (Southern California); R Smith (Southern California)	4	3
5-8	J Cash (Oklahoma St.); A Kadhe (Oklahoma St.)	6	6
N Braun (Mississippi St.); T Foshey (Mississippi St.)	6	3	[10]
A Day (Princeton); L Gamble (Princeton)	4	6	[5]
B Pennington (Kentucky); E Wallart (Kentucky)	3	2
4	S Mansouri (Wake Forest); C Seraphim (Wake Forest)	6	6
S Donohue (Louisville); P Wynn (Louisville)	3	4
A Harris (Oklahoma); S Papa (Oklahoma)	6	6
H Pöllänen (Ohio St.); M Torpegaard (Ohio St.)	6	2	[5]
5-8	Mi Redlicki (Arkansas); J Salazar (Arkansas)	2	6	[10]
C Curry (Texas Tech); B Thomson (Texas Tech)	0	6	[10]
J Corbett (Virginia Tech); H Korsgaard (Virginia Tech)	6	4	[6]
M Hinnisdaels (Auburn); C Huertas (Auburn)	3	3
2	Ma Redlicki (UCLA); E Zhu (UCLA)	6	6

Round of 16; May 26, 2017
W Blumberg (North Carolina); R Kelly (North Carolina)	4	6	[10]
5-8	J Cash (Oklahoma St.); A Kadhe (Oklahoma St.)	6	2	[5]
N Braun (Mississippi St.); T Foshey (Mississippi St.)	1	5
4	S Mansouri (Wake Forest); C Seraphim (Wake Forest)	6	7
A Harris (Oklahoma); S Papa (Oklahoma)	6	3	[10]
5-8	Mi Redlicki (Arkansas); J Salazar (Arkansas)	2	6	[7]
C Curry (Texas Tech); B Thomson (Texas Tech)	3	3
2	Ma Redlicki (UCLA); E Zhu (UCLA)	6	6

Quarterfinals; May 27, 2017
W Blumberg (North Carolina); R Kelly (North Carolina)	6^{6}	6	[11]
4	S Mansouri (Wake Forest); C Seraphim (Wake Forest)	7^{8}	3	[13]
A Harris (Oklahoma); S Papa (Oklahoma)	6	7^{7}
2	Ma Redlicki (UCLA); E Zhu (UCLA)	1	6^{4}

Semifinals; May 28, 2017
4	S Mansouri (Wake Forest); C Seraphim (Wake Forest)	6	3	[10]
A Harris (Oklahoma); S Papa (Oklahoma)	4	6	[12]

== Women's doubles championship ==
=== National seeds ===
1. Astra Sharma /Emily Smith, Vanderbilt (withdrew from tournament)
2. Jasmine Lee/Lisa Marie Rioux, Mississippi State (round of 32)
3. Aldila Sutjiadi/Mami Adachi, Kentucky (quarterfinals)
4. Hayley Carter/Jessie Aney, North Carolina (round of 32)

Players ranked 5th–8th, listed alphabetically by institution

- Erin Routliffe/Maddie Pothoff, Alabama (runner-up)
- Ellen Perez/Caroline Brinson, Georgia (round of 32)
- Christine Maddox/Mayar Sherif Ahmed, Pepperdine (round of 32)
- Rutjua Bhosale/Rachel Pierson, Texas A&M (round of 16)

=== Bracket ===
==== Finals ====
Semifinals; May 28, 2017
Maya Jansen (California; Maegan Manasse (California)	2	3
Francesa Di Lorenzo (Ohio State); Miho Kowase (Ohio State)	6	6
Ryann Foster (LSU); Joana Valle Costa (LSU)	1	1
5–8	Maddie Pothoff (Alabama); Erin Routliffe (Alabama)	6	6

Finals; May 29, 2017
Francesa Di Lorenzo (Ohio State); Miho Kowase (Ohio State)	6	6	[10]
5–8	Maddie Pothoff (Alabama); Erin Routliffe (Alabama)	7^{6}	4	[7]

==== Top half ====
Round of 32; May 25, 2017
Shannon Hudson (Arkansas); Giulia Pairone (Arkansas)	7	6
Vladica Babic (Oklahoma State); Carla Tur Mari (Oklahoma State)	5	1
Kate Fahey (Michigan); Alex Najarian (Michigan)	2	2
Booke Austin (Florida); Kourtney Keegan (Florida)	6	6
5–8	Christine Maddox (Pepperdine); Mayar Sherif Ahmed (Pepperdine)	4	2
Martina Frantova (NC State; Anna Rogers (NC State)	6	6
Amina Ismail (Missouri); Beatriz Machado Santos (Missouri)	2	2
Maya Jansen (California; Maegan Manasse (California)	6	6
3	Mami Adachi (Kentucky); Aldila Sutjiadi (Kentucky)	6	5	[10]
Rasheeda McAdoo (Georgia Tech; Johnnise Renaud (Georgia Tech)	2	7	[6]
Hadley Berg (South Carolina); Paige Cline (South Carolina)	6	5
Jada Hart (UCLA); Ena Shibahara (UCLA)	3	2^{ret.}
5–8	Caroline Brinson (Georgia); Ellen Perez (Georgia)	7	1	[10]
Francesa Di Lorenzo (Ohio State); Miho Kowase (Ohio State)	5	6	[6]
Alizee Michaud (Auburn); Taylor Russo (Auburn)	6	6
Donika Bashota (TCU); Olaya Garrido-Rivas (TCU)	0	3

Round of 16; May 26, 2017
S Hudson (Arkansas); G Pairone (Arkansas)	5	1
B Austin (Florida); K Keegan (Florida)	7	6
M Frantova (NC State; A Rogers (NC State)	4	6
M Jansen (California; M Manasse (California)	6	7^{6}
3	M Adachi (Kentucky); A Sutjiadi (Kentucky)	2	7^{6}	[10]
H Berg (South Carolina); P Cline (South Carolina)	6	6	[5]
F Di Lorenzo (Ohio State); M Kowase (Ohio State)	6	6
A Michaud (Auburn); T Russo (Auburn	4	3

Quarterfinals; May 27, 2017
B Austin (Florida); K Keegan (Florida)	6	2
M Jansen (California; M Manasse (California)	7^{3}	6
3	M Adachi (Kentucky); A Sutjiadi (Kentucky)	3	5
F Di Lorenzo (Ohio State); M Kowase (Ohio State)	6	7

Semifinals; May 28, 2017
M Jansen (California; M Manasse (California)	2	3
F Di Lorenzo (Ohio State); M Kowase (Ohio State)	6	6

==== Bottom half ====
Round of 32; May 25, 2017
Melissa Baker (UC Santa Barbara); Palina Dubavets (UC Santa Barbara)	2	5
Ryann Foster (LSU); Joana Valle Costa (LSU)	6	7
Astrid Gehre (UT Arlington); Anna Wichert (UT Arlington)	5	3
5–8	Rutuja Bhosale (Texas A&M); Rachel Pierson (Texas A&M)	7	6
Sarah Dvorak (Texas Tech); Sabrina Federici (Texas Tech)	2	5
Alex Chatt (Northwestern); Maddie Lipp (Northwestern)	6	7
Elena Christofi (Georgia); Kennedy Shaffer (Georgia)	6	6
4	Jessie Aney (North Carolina); Hayley Carter (North Carolina)	3	4
Anna Danilina (Florida); Ingrid Neel (Florida)	1	6	[6]
Paige Hourigan (Georgia Tech); Kenya Jones (Georgia Tech)	6	3	[10]
Emily Arbuthnott (Stanford); Taylor Davidson (Stanford)	1	3
5–8	Maddie Pothoff (Alabama); Erin Routliffe (Alabama)	6	6
Julia O'Loughlin (Denver); Maureen Slattery (Denver)	6	7
Alexa Bortles (Ole Miss); Arianne Hartono (Ole Miss)	1	5
Tess Bernard-Feigenbaum (Kansas); Nina Khmelnitckaia (Kansas)	3	6	[10]
2	Jasmine Lee (Mississippi State); Lisa Marie Rioux (Mississippi State)	6	4	[8]

Round of 16; May 26, 2017
R Foster (LSU); J Valle Costa (LSU)	6	3	[10]
5–8	R Bhosale (Texas A&M); R Pierson (Texas A&M)	4	6	[6]
A Chatt (Northwestern); M Lipp (Northwestern)	4	3
E Christofi (Georgia); K Shaffer (Georgia)	6	6
P Hourigan (Georgia Tech); K Jones (Georgia Tech)	5	7	[6]
5–8	M Pothoff (Alabama); E Routliffe (Alabama)	7	5	[10]
J O'Loughlin (Denver); M Slattery (Denver)	6	6
T Bernard-Feigenbaum (Kansas); N Khmelnitckaia (Kansas)	4	2

Quarterfinals; May 27, 2017
R Foster (LSU); J Valle Costa (LSU)	1	6	[11]
E Christofi (Georgia); K Shaffer (Georgia)	6	2	[9]
5–8	M Pothoff (Alabama); E Routliffe (Alabama)	6	6
J O'Loughlin (Denver); M Slattery (Denver)	4	2

Semifinals; May 28, 2017
R Foster (LSU); J Valle Costa (LSU)	1	1
5–8	M Pothoff (Alabama); E Routliffe (Alabama)	6	6
