= Sara Daavettila =

American tennis player (born 1997)

- Country (sports): United States
- Born: December 17, 1997 (age 28) Williamston, Michigan
- Height: 5 ft 6 in (168 cm)
- Plays: Right (two-handed backhand)
- College: North Carolina (2016–2021)
- Prize money: $63,519

Singles
- Career record: 165–109
- Career titles: 3 ITF
- Highest ranking: No. 424 (November 10, 2025)
- Current ranking: No. 839 (November 16, 2026)

Doubles
- Career record: 50–65
- Career titles: 3 ITF
- Highest ranking: No. 524 (February 26, 2024)
- Current ranking: No. 871 (November 16, 2026)
- Last updated on: 19 November 2026.

Sara Daavettila (born December 17, 1997) is an American professional tennis player. She has a career-high singles ranking by the WTA of 424, achieved on 10 November 2025, and best doubles ranking of 524, achieved on 26 February 2024.

Born in Michigan to a former college player, she had successful junior years. She went undefeated in two seasons of high school tennis. She played five years of college tennis for the North Carolina Tar Heels, reaching a peak NCAA Division I singles ranking of No. 1. She reached at least the quarterfinals of the NCAA Championships three times. Since turning professional she has played on the ITF Women's World Tennis Tour, where she has won two singles titles and one doubles title.

== Early life and junior circuit ==
Daavettila grew up in Williamston, Michigan, the oldest of six siblings. She started playing tennis at age three or four. Her mother, who played college tennis at Western Michigan University, coached her from a young age. She performed well at United States Tennis Association (USTA) events as a junior, winning ten national titles and more than twenty USTA Midwest titles.

Homeschooled until tenth grade, Daavettila enrolled in Williamston High School, in Division 3 of the Michigan High School Athletic Association (MHSAA), for her sophomore year in 2013–14. She said she did so partly to have a chance to play her friend, senior Alexandria Najarian of Cranbrook Kingswood, before she left for college at the University of Michigan. Daavettila went undefeated in seventeen matches on her way to the state championship final, where she faced Najarian, the three-time defending champion. Daavettila won 6–2, 6–1, handing Najarian the only defeat of her high school career.

Daavettila played again for the Williamston Hornets in 2014–15. Having not lost a set as a sophomore, she did not lose a game her entire junior season in twenty-four matches, becoming the first high school player to do so, and defended her state championship. She returned to homeschooling her senior year to have more time for USTA competitions. She verbally committed to the University of North Carolina by early 2015 and signed a letter of intent in November 2015. She was considered the top recruit of the class of 2016.

== Career ==
=== College years ===
Daavettila began playing for the North Carolina Tar Heels as the Intercollegiate Tennis Association (ITA)'s top-ranked incoming freshman of 2016–17. She won the ITA Carolina Regionals singles title in the fall of 2016. She played mostly at No. 2 singles in the regular season, going 20–7 to help North Carolina win the Atlantic Coast Conference (ACC) Championship, and was named ACC Freshman of the Year. She reached the quarterfinals of the NCAA Championships in singles, finishing the season ranked No. 14 in singles with an overall record of 43–11.

Daavettila went 29–12 in singles in her sophomore season in 2017–18. She helped North Carolina win the ITA Team Indoor Championship, being named most outstanding player, and defend the ACC Championship. She and teammate Alle Sanford reached the semifinals of the NCAA Championships in doubles, having entering the event as an alternate. North Carolina again defended the ACC Championship in her junior season in 2018–19 and reached the semifinals of the NCAA Championships as a team. Daavettila again won the ITA Carolina Regionals singles title and made the quarterfinals of the NCAA singles tournament, finishing the year with a singles record of 32–8 and ranked at No. 12.

Daavettila won the ITA National Fall Championships singles title in the fall of 2019–20, beating No. 1 Estela Perez-Somarriba of Miami in the semifinals and Anna Turati of Texas in the final. She went 23–2 in singles and 13–5 in doubles to rank No. 5 in singles and No. 4 in doubles with Alexa Graham at the end of the pandemic-shortened season. This season and next season, she was again named most outstanding player at the ITA Team Indoor Championships, helping North Carolina win consecutive indoor titles in 2020 and 2021. She reached the No. 1 singles ranking in April 2021 as she went 22–2 in her final season. North Carolina, on a 48-match winning streak, won the ACC Championship but were upset in the semifinals of the NCAA Championships, where Daavettila made the NCAA singles semifinals. Her college career ended ranked No. 3 in singles and doubles, and she received the ACC Player of the Year Award and the Honda Sports Award as the nation's top college tennis player. She graduated with a bachelor's degree in communication studies in May 2021.

=== Professional ===
Daavettila debuted on the ITF Women's World Tennis Tour in 2013 at age 15. She was selected to the USTA Collegiate Summer Team in mid-2021. She reached her first ITF doubles final at a W15 tournament in San Diego, California, in June 2022, partnering former North Carolina teammate Makenna Jones, and reached her first ITF singles final at a W15 event in Champaign, Illinois, in November 2022. She won her first professional titles at the next year's W15 event in San Diego in June 2023, where she won in singles and doubles with Katherine Hui.

== ITF Circuit finals ==
=== Singles: 7 (3 titles, 4 runner-ups) ===
Legend
W15 tournaments

Result	W–L	Date	Tournament	Tier	Surface	Opponent	Score
Loss	0–1	Nov 2022	ITF Champaign, United States	W15	Hard	(China) Tian Fangran	1–6, 3–6
Win	1–1	Jun 2023	ITF San Diego, United States	W15	Hard	(South Africa) Chanel Simmonds	7–6^{(3)}, 7–5
Loss	1–2	Apr 2024	ITF Monastir, Tunisia	W15	Hard	(United States) Hina Inoue	6–2, 6–7^{(2)}, 4–6
Win	2–2	Jun 2024	ITF San Diego, United States	W15	Hard	(United States) Maya Iyengar	6–0, 6–0
Loss	2–3	Jun 2024	ITF San Diego, United States	W15	Hard	(United States) Fiona Crawley	4–6, 6–1, 3–6
Loss	2–4	Nov 2024	ITF Clemson, United States	W15	Hard	(United States) Emma Charney	6–7^{(4)}, 6–7^{(3)}
Win	3–4	Feb 2025	ITF Monastir, Tunisia	W15	Hard	(United States) Alexis Blokhina	7–5, 4–3 ret.

=== Doubles: 6 (3 titles, 3 runner-ups) ===
Legend
W35 tournaments
W15 tournaments

Result	W–L	Date	Tournament	Tier	Surface	Partner	Opponents	Score
Loss	0–1	Jun 2022	ITF San Diego, US	W15	Hard	(United States) Makenna Jones	(Thailand) Bunyawi Thamchaiwat (Chinese Taipei) Yang Ya-yi	3–6, 4–6
Win	1–1	Jun 2023	ITF San Diego, US	W15	Hard	(United States) Katherine Hui	(United States) Malaika Rapolu (Ukraine) Anita Sahdiieva]	7–6^{(4)}, 6–4
Win	2–1	Nov 2024	ITF Clemson, US	W15	Hard	(United States) Makenna Jones	(Poland) Olivia Bergler (France) Sophia Biolay	6–0, 6–2
Loss	2–2	Feb 2025	ITF Monastir, Tunisia	W15	Hard	(Greece) Martha Matoula	(China) Guo Meiqi (China) Xiao Zhenghua	6–4, 6–7^{(5)}, [8–10]
Loss	2–3	Mar 2025	ITF Montreal, Canada	W15	Hard (i)	(United States) Sabastiani Leon	(Canada) Raphaëlle Lacasse (United States) Christina McHale	5–7, 1–6
Win	3–3	Jun 2026	ITF Decatur, US	W35	Hard	(Russia) Maria Kononova	(United States) Thara Gowda (United States) Kaede Usui	6–3, 6–2
