= 2017 US Open – Women's doubles =

Women's doubles
- 2017 US Open

Final
- Champions: (Chinese Taipei) Chan Yung-jan (Switzerland) Martina Hingis
- Runners-up: (Czech Republic) Lucie Hradecká (Czech Republic) Kateřina Siniaková
- Score: 6–3, 6–2

Details
- Draw: 64 (7 WC )
- Seeds: 16

Events
Singles	men	women		boys	girls
Doubles	men	women	mixed	boys	girls
WC Singles	men	women	quad
WC Doubles	men	women	quad
Legends	men	women	mixed
← 2016 ·	US Open	· 2018 →

Chan Yung-jan and Martina Hingis defeated Lucie Hradecká and Kateřina Siniaková in the final, 6–3, 6–2 to win the women's doubles tennis title at the 2017 US Open. It was their first Grand Slam title together, and their seventh title overall, all in 2017.

Bethanie Mattek-Sands and Lucie Šafářová were the reigning champions, but Mattek-Sands was unable to compete due to injury. Šafářová played alongside Barbora Strýcová, but lost in the semifinals to Hradecká and Siniaková.

== Seeds ==
1. (Russia) Ekaterina Makarova / (Russia) Elena Vesnina (third round)
2. (Chinese Taipei) Chan Yung-jan / (Switzerland) Martina Hingis (champions)
3. (Czech Republic) Lucie Šafářová / (Czech Republic) Barbora Strýcová (semifinals)
4. (India) Sania Mirza / (China) Peng Shuai (semifinals)
5. (Hungary) Tímea Babos / (Czech Republic) Andrea Hlaváčková (quarterfinals)
6. (Australia) Ashleigh Barty / (Australia) Casey Dellacqua (second round)
7. (Czech Republic) Lucie Hradecká / (Czech Republic) Kateřina Siniaková (final)
8. (Germany) Anna-Lena Grönefeld / (Czech Republic) Květa Peschke (first round)

9. (Canada) Gabriela Dabrowski / (China) Xu Yifan (quarterfinals)
10. (United States) Abigail Spears / (Slovenia) Katarina Srebotnik (first round)
11. (Netherlands) Kiki Bertens / (Sweden) Johanna Larsson (third round)
12. (Chinese Taipei) Hsieh Su-wei / (Romania) Monica Niculescu (third round)
13. (France) Kristina Mladenovic / (Russia) Anastasia Pavlyuchenkova (third round)
14. (Slovenia) Andreja Klepač / (Spain) María José Martínez Sánchez (quarterfinals)
15. (Japan) Makoto Ninomiya / (Czech Republic) Renata Voráčová (first round)
16. (Japan) Nao Hibino / (Poland) Alicja Rosolska (second round)

Click on the seed number of a player to go to their draw section.

== Draw ==
=== Key ===
- Q = Qualifier
- WC = Wild card
- LL = Lucky loser
- Alt = Alternate
- SE = Special exempt
- PR = Protected ranking
- ITF = ITF entry
- JE = Junior exempt
- w/o = Walkover
- r = Retired
- d = Defaulted
- SR = Special ranking

=== Finals ===
Quarterfinals
14	(Slovenia) Andreja Klepač (Spain) María José Martínez Sánchez	6^{2}	3
7	(Czech Republic) Lucie Hradecká (Czech Republic) Kateřina Siniaková	7^{7}	6
3	(Czech Republic) Lucie Šafářová (Czech Republic) Barbora Strýcová	6	2	6
9	(Canada) Gabriela Dabrowski (China) Xu Yifan	3	6	4
5	(Hungary) Tímea Babos (Czech Republic) Andrea Hlaváčková	6^{5}	4
4	(India) Sania Mirza (China) Peng Shuai	7^{7}	6
(Chinese Taipei) Chan Hao-ching (China) Zhang Shuai	2	2
2	(Chinese Taipei) Chan Yung-jan (Switzerland) Martina Hingis	6	6

Semifinals
7	(Czech Republic) Lucie Hradecká (Czech Republic) Kateřina Siniaková	6	7
3	(Czech Republic) Lucie Šafářová (Czech Republic) Barbora Strýcová	2	5
4	(India) Sania Mirza (China) Peng Shuai	4	4
2	(Chinese Taipei) Chan Yung-jan (Switzerland) Martina Hingis	6	6

Final
7	(Czech Republic) Lucie Hradecká (Czech Republic) Kateřina Siniaková	3	2
2	(Chinese Taipei) Chan Yung-jan (Switzerland) Martina Hingis	6	6

=== Top half ===
==== Section 1 ====
First round
1	(Russia) E Makarova (Russia) E Vesnina	6	6
(United States) J Brady (United States) A Riske	2	3
(United States) C Bellis (Czech Republic) M Vondroušová	3	4
(Ukraine) N Kichenok (Australia) An Rodionova	6	6
(Belgium) E Mertens (Netherlands) D Schuurs	7	6
(Canada) E Bouchard (Latvia) J Ostapenko	5	2
(United States) S Rogers (United States) C Vandeweghe	2	6^{6}
14	(Slovenia) A Klepač (Spain) MJ Martínez Sánchez	6	7^{8}
11	(Netherlands) K Bertens (Sweden) J Larsson	6	6
(Germany) J Görges (Ukraine) O Savchuk	2	2
(Japan) N Osaka (Italy) F Schiavone	3	2
WC	(United States) J Boserup (United States) N Gibbs	6	6
(United Kingdom) N Broady (Croatia) D Jurak	6^{5}	2
(Germany) M Barthel (Germany) C Witthöft	7^{7}	6
(France) A Cornet (Switzerland) X Knoll	3	6^{3}
7	(Czech Republic) L Hradecká (Czech Republic) K Siniaková	6	7^{7}

Second round
1	(Russia) E Makarova (Russia) E Vesnina	4	6	6
(Ukraine) N Kichenok (Australia) An Rodionova	6	2	1
(Belgium) E Mertens (Netherlands) D Schuurs	6	2	5
14	(Slovenia) A Klepač (Spain) MJ Martínez Sánchez	4	6	7
11	(Netherlands) K Bertens (Sweden) J Larsson	6	6
WC	(United States) J Boserup (United States) N Gibbs	2	3
(Germany) M Barthel (Germany) C Witthöft	2	4
7	(Czech Republic) L Hradecká (Czech Republic) K Siniaková	6	6

Third round
1	(Russia) E Makarova (Russia) E Vesnina	3	4
14	(Slovenia) A Klepač (Spain) MJ Martínez Sánchez	6	6
11	(Netherlands) K Bertens (Sweden) J Larsson	1	3
7	(Czech Republic) L Hradecká (Czech Republic) K Siniaková	6	6

Quarterfinals
14	(Slovenia) A Klepač (Spain) MJ Martínez Sánchez	6^{2}	3
7	(Czech Republic) L Hradecká (Czech Republic) K Siniaková	7^{7}	6

==== Section 2 ====
First round
3	(Czech Republic) L Šafářová (Czech Republic) B Strýcová	6	6
(United States) C McHale (United Kingdom) H Watson	2	4
(Russia) A Kudryavtseva (China) S Zheng	6	6
WC	(United States) T Johnson (United States) C Liu	2	2
WC	(United States) J Cako (United States) S Vickery	3	6	7^{7}
(France) O Dodin (Germany) T Maria	6	1	6^{5}
(Ukraine) L Kichenok (Czech Republic) B Krejčíková	6	6
15	(Japan) M Ninomiya (Czech Republic) R Voráčová	2	2
9	(Canada) G Dabrowski (China) Y Xu	3
(Croatia) M Lučić-Baroni (Germany) A Petkovic	2^{r}
(United States) M Brengle (United States) V Lepchenko	1	2
(Spain) L Arruabarrena (Spain) A Parra Santonja	6	6
(Japan) S Aoyama (China) Z Yang	6	6
WC	(United States) A Anisimova (United States) E Bektas	4	1
(Russia) N Dzalamidze (Russia) V Kudermetova	3	6	1
6	(Australia) A Barty (Australia) C Dellacqua	6	3	6

Second round
3	(Czech Republic) L Šafářová (Czech Republic) B Strýcová	6	6
(Russia) A Kudryavtseva (China) S Zheng	3	2
WC	(United States) J Cako (United States) S Vickery	2	3
(Ukraine) L Kichenok (Czech Republic) B Krejčíková	6	6
9	(Canada) G Dabrowski (China) Y Xu	6	7^{7}
(Spain) L Arruabarrena (Spain) A Parra Santonja	4	6^{4}
(Japan) S Aoyama (China) Z Yang	6	3	6
6	(Australia) A Barty (Australia) C Dellacqua	0	6	4

Third round
3	(Czech Republic) L Šafářová (Czech Republic) B Strýcová	6	5	6
(Ukraine) L Kichenok (Czech Republic) B Krejčíková	1	7	2
9	(Canada) G Dabrowski (China) Y Xu	5	6	6
(Japan) S Aoyama (China) Z Yang	7	3	3

Quarterfinals
3	(Czech Republic) L Šafářová (Czech Republic) B Strýcová	6	2	6
9	(Canada) G Dabrowski (China) Y Xu	3	6	4

=== Bottom half ===
==== Section 3 ====
First round
5	(Hungary) T Babos (Czech Republic) A Hlaváčková	6	6
(Serbia) N Stojanović (Russia) N Vikhlyantseva	4	2
(United States) R Atawo (Germany) S Lisicki	3	7	6
(United States) N Melichar (United Kingdom) A Smith	6	5	3
WC	(United States) F Di Lorenzo (United States) A Kiick	6^{5}	6^{4}
(Japan) E Hozumi (Japan) M Kato	7^{7}	7^{7}
(Belgium) K Flipkens (Serbia) A Krunić	2	4
12	(Chinese Taipei) S-w Hsieh (Romania) M Niculescu	6	6
16	(Japan) N Hibino (Poland) A Rosolska	6	6
(Ukraine) K Bondarenko (China) C Liang	4	2
WC	(United States) K Ahn (United States) I Falconi	3	2
(Romania) S Cîrstea (Spain) S Sorribes Tormo	6	6
(Switzerland) V Golubic (Czech Republic) Kr Plíšková	2	6^{4}
(Slovakia) J Čepelová (Slovakia) M Rybáriková	6	7^{7}
(Croatia) P Martić (Croatia) D Vekić	4	1
4	(India) S Mirza (China) S Peng	6	6

Second round
5	(Hungary) T Babos (Czech Republic) A Hlaváčková	6	6
(United States) R Atawo (Germany) S Lisicki	3	4
(Japan) E Hozumi (Japan) M Kato	4	2
12	(Chinese Taipei) S-w Hsieh (Romania) M Niculescu	6	6
16	(Japan) N Hibino (Poland) A Rosolska	3	3
(Romania) S Cîrstea (Spain) S Sorribes Tormo	6	6
(Slovakia) J Čepelová (Slovakia) M Rybáriková	7^{7}	3	3
4	(India) S Mirza (China) S Peng	6^{5}	6	6

Third round
5	(Hungary) T Babos (Czech Republic) A Hlaváčková	6	6^{1}	7^{7}
12	(Chinese Taipei) S-w Hsieh (Romania) M Niculescu	2	7^{7}	6^{5}
(Romania) S Cîrstea (Spain) S Sorribes Tormo	2	6	6^{2}
4	(India) S Mirza (China) S Peng	6	3	7^{7}

Quarterfinals
5	(Hungary) T Babos (Czech Republic) A Hlaváčková	6^{5}	4
4	(India) S Mirza (China) S Peng	7^{7}	6

==== Section 4 ====
First round
8	(Germany) A-L Grönefeld (Czech Republic) K Peschke	7	2	0
(Chinese Taipei) C-j Chuang (Japan) M Doi	5	6	6
(Romania) I-C Begu (Romania) R Olaru	3	3
(Australia) D Gavrilova (Russia) D Kasatkina	6	6
(Chinese Taipei) H-c Chan (China) S Zhang	6	6
PR	(United States) L Davis (United States) M Moulton-Levy	1	2
WC	(United States) K Day (United States) C Dolehide	6	6
10	(United States) A Spears (Slovenia) K Srebotnik	3	3
13	(France) K Mladenovic (Russia) A Pavlyuchenkova	5	6	6
(Brazil) B Haddad Maia (Croatia) A Konjuh	7	3	0
(China) Q Wang (China) Y Wang	6	6
PR	(United States) S Stephens (United States) T Townsend	4	4
PR	(United States) A Muhammad (Australia) A Tomljanović	3	7^{7}	3
(Serbia) J Janković (Latvia) A Sevastova	6	6^{3}	6
(Kazakhstan) Y Putintseva (Australia) Ar Rodionova	2	2
2	(Chinese Taipei) Y-j Chan (Switzerland) M Hingis	6	6

Second round
(Chinese Taipei) C-j Chuang (Japan) M Doi	3	5
(Australia) D Gavrilova (Russia) D Kasatkina	6	7
(Chinese Taipei) H-c Chan (China) S Zhang	6	6
WC	(United States) K Day (United States) C Dolehide	3	4
13	(France) K Mladenovic (Russia) A Pavlyuchenkova	3	6	6
(China) Q Wang (China) Y Wang	6	4	0
(Serbia) J Janković (Latvia) A Sevastova	1	3
2	(Chinese Taipei) Y-j Chan (Switzerland) M Hingis	6	6

Third round
(Australia) D Gavrilova (Russia) D Kasatkina	3	6	2
(Chinese Taipei) H-c Chan (China) S Zhang	6	1	6
13	(France) K Mladenovic (Russia) A Pavlyuchenkova	4	5
2	(Chinese Taipei) Y-j Chan (Switzerland) M Hingis	6	7

Quarterfinals
(Chinese Taipei) H-c Chan (China) S Zhang	2	2
2	(Chinese Taipei) Y-j Chan (Switzerland) M Hingis	6	6
