= Brienne Minor =

American tennis player (born 1997)

- Country (sports): United States
- Born: November 25, 1997 (age 28) Mundelein, Illinois, United States
- Height: 5 ft 8 in (1.73 m)
- Plays: Right-handed (two-handed backhand)
- College: University of Michigan
- Prize money: $53,076

Singles
- Career record: 6–16
- Highest ranking: No. 907 (September 25, 2017)

Grand Slam singles results
- US Open: 1R (2017)

Doubles
- Career record: 8–9
- Highest ranking: No. 954 (September 18, 2017)

Brienne Alexandra Minor (born November 25, 1997) is an American tennis player who played her college career at the University of Michigan. On May 29, 2017, she won the 2017 NCAA Division I Women's Tennis Championships, becoming the first African-American woman to win the singles title. This victory also secured Minor a spot in the main draw of the 2017 US Open as a wildcard.

== Early life and college career ==
Minor was raised in Mundelein, Illinois. She began playing tennis at the age of four. Minor attended Carmel High School and during her senior year at Carmel, she went undefeated during the season, winning a state championship in the process. On November 13, 2014, she signed her national letter of intent to play collegiate tennis at the University of Michigan. Minor had been ranked as the 15th best recruit in the country.

During her first season with the Wolverines, Minor finished with a 36–10 record. Her performance earned her spots in both the National Collegiate Athletic Association singles and doubles tournaments. She earned all-Big Ten and ITA All-American honors at the end of the season.

Minor capped off her sophomore season by winning the 2017 NCAA Division I Women's singles title, the first in Michigan's history. Minor defeated the Florida's Belinda Woolcock in the final. She was also the first African-American woman to accomplish this feat and the first black athlete to win a singles title since Arthur Ashe in 1965. As it is tradition with American NCAA champions, Minor received a wildcard entry into the 2017 US Open. Minor was also named ITA All-American for the second straight year.

In her major singles debut at the 2017 US Open, Minor lost to Ons Jabeur in straight sets.

== Personal life ==
Brienne's parents are Kevin and Michelle Minor. She has two older sisters named Jasmine and Kristina. Minor is majoring in sports management. As a big fan of pop singer Beyoncé, Minor received the nickname "Briyoncé," from best friend Caroline Nonnenmacher.
