= 2017 US Open – Men's doubles =

Men's doubles
- 2017 US Open

Final
- Champions: (Netherlands) Jean-Julien Rojer (Romania) Horia Tecău
- Runners-up: (Spain) Feliciano López (Spain) Marc López
- Score: 6–4, 6–3

Details
- Draw: 64
- Seeds: 16

Events
Singles	men	women		boys	girls
Doubles	men	women	mixed	boys	girls
WC Singles	men	women	quad
WC Doubles	men	women	quad
Legends	men	women	mixed
← 2016 ·	US Open	· 2018 →

Jamie Murray and Bruno Soares were the defending champions, but lost in the quarterfinals to Jean-Julien Rojer and Horia Tecău.

Rojer and Tecău went on to win the title, defeating Feliciano López and Marc López in the final, 6–4, 6–3.

== Seeds ==
1. (Finland) Henri Kontinen / (Australia) John Peers (semifinals)
2. (Poland) Łukasz Kubot / (Brazil) Marcelo Melo (second round)
3. (France) Pierre-Hugues Herbert / (France) Nicolas Mahut (first round)
4. (United Kingdom) Jamie Murray / (Brazil) Bruno Soares (quarterfinals)
5. (United States) Bob Bryan / (United States) Mike Bryan (semifinals)
6. (Croatia) Ivan Dodig / (Spain) Marcel Granollers (third round)
7. (South Africa) Raven Klaasen / (United States) Rajeev Ram (first round)
8. (United States) Ryan Harrison / (New Zealand) Michael Venus (first round)

9. (Austria) Oliver Marach / (Croatia) Mate Pavić (third round)
10. (India) Rohan Bopanna / (Uruguay) Pablo Cuevas (second round)
11. (Spain) Feliciano López / (Spain) Marc López (final)
12. (Netherlands) Jean-Julien Rojer / (Romania) Horia Tecău (champions)
13. (United States) Brian Baker / (Croatia) Nikola Mektić (first round)
14. (Chile) Julio Peralta / (Argentina) Horacio Zeballos (second round)
15. (Mexico) Santiago González / (United States) Donald Young (first round)
16. (Australia) Sam Groth / (Pakistan) Aisam-ul-Haq Qureshi (first round)

Click on the seed number of a player to go to their draw section.

== Draw ==
=== Key ===
- Q = Qualifier
- WC = Wild card
- LL = Lucky loser
- Alt = Alternate
- ITF = ITF entry
- PR = Protected ranking
- SR = Special ranking
- SE = Special exempt
- JE = Junior exempt
- JR = Junior Accelerator Programme entrant
- CO = College Accelerator Programme entrant
- NG = Next Gen Accelerator Program entrant
- w/o = Walkover
- r = Retired
- d = Defaulted

=== Finals ===
Quarterfinals
1	(Finland) Henri Kontinen (Australia) John Peers	6	6
(United States) Nicholas Monroe (Australia) John-Patrick Smith	3	4
4	(United Kingdom) Jamie Murray (Brazil) Bruno Soares	1	2
12	(Netherlands) Jean-Julien Rojer (Romania) Horia Tecău	6	6
11	(Spain) Feliciano López (Spain) Marc López	6	7
(Netherlands) Robin Haase (Netherlands) Matwé Middelkoop	4	5
5	(United States) Bob Bryan (United States) Mike Bryan	6	7
(France) Julien Benneteau (France) Édouard Roger-Vasselin	3	5

Semifinals
1	(Finland) Henri Kontinen (Australia) John Peers	6	6^{5}	5
12	(Netherlands) Jean-Julien Rojer (Romania) Horia Tecău	1	7^{7}	7
11	(Spain) Feliciano López (Spain) Marc López	3	6	6
5	(United States) Bob Bryan (United States) Mike Bryan	6	3	4

Final
12	(Netherlands) Jean-Julien Rojer (Romania) Horia Tecău	6	6
11	(Spain) Feliciano López (Spain) Marc López	4	3

=== Top half ===
==== Section 1 ====
First round
1	(Finland) H Kontinen (Australia) J Peers	6	6
WC	(United States) W Blumberg (United States) S Papa	3	3
(United Kingdom) D Inglot (Canada) D Nestor	4	5
(Russia) M Elgin (Russia) D Medvedev	6	7
(Argentina) C Berlocq (Spain) A Ramos Viñolas	2	6^{3}
(Colombia) JS Cabal (Argentina) L Mayer	6	7^{7}
(United States) J Cerretani (Australia) M Polmans	6^{1}	1
14	(Chile) J Peralta (Argentina) H Zeballos	7^{7}	6
10	(India) R Bopanna (Uruguay) P Cuevas	1	6	6
WC	(United States) B Klahn (United States) S Lipsky	6	3	4
WC	(United States) S Johnson (United States) T Paul	0	0
PR	(Italy) S Bolelli (Italy) F Fognini	6	6
(France) J Eysseric (Croatia) F Škugor	2	2
(United States) N Monroe (Australia) J-P Smith	6	6
(Brazil) R Dutra Silva (Italy) P Lorenzi	6	6
7	(South Africa) R Klaasen (United States) R Ram	4	4

Second round
1	(Finland) H Kontinen (Australia) J Peers	7^{7}	6
(Russia) M Elgin (Russia) D Medvedev	6^{3}	4
(Colombia) JS Cabal (Argentina) L Mayer	6	3	6
14	(Chile) J Peralta (Argentina) H Zeballos	2	6	3
10	(India) R Bopanna (Uruguay) P Cuevas	7	4	4
PR	(Italy) S Bolelli (Italy) F Fognini	5	6	6
(United States) N Monroe (Australia) J-P Smith	6^{1}	6	6
(Brazil) R Dutra Silva (Italy) P Lorenzi	7^{7}	4	3

Third round
1	(Finland) H Kontinen (Australia) J Peers	6	6
(Colombia) JS Cabal (Argentina) L Mayer	3	4
PR	(Italy) S Bolelli (Italy) F Fognini	d
(United States) N Monroe (Australia) J-P Smith

Quarterfinals
1	(Finland) H Kontinen (Australia) J Peers	6	6
(United States) N Monroe (Australia) J-P Smith	3	4

==== Section 2 ====
First round
4	(United Kingdom) J Murray (Brazil) B Soares	6	7^{8}
(Austria) J Knowle (Austria) A Peya	4	6^{6}
(Spain) P Carreño Busta (Spain) F Verdasco	3	7^{7}	4
(New Zealand) M Daniell (Brazil) M Demoliner	6	6^{3}	6
(Argentina) A Molteni (Canada) A Shamasdin	6^{3}	2
Alt	(Australia) J Millman (United Kingdom) K Skupski	7^{7}	6
(Sweden) R Lindstedt (Australia) J Thompson	6	6
15	(Mexico) S González (United States) D Young	3	3
12	(Netherlands) J-J Rojer (Romania) H Tecău	7^{7}	6^{4}	6
(Bosnia and Herzegovina) D Džumhur (Serbia) D Lajović	6^{5}	7^{7}	3
(South Korea) H Chung (Chinese Taipei) Y-h Lu	6	1
(Argentina) G Pella (Argentina) D Schwartzman	3	1^{r}
(Italy) T Fabbiano (Japan) Y Sugita	4	2
(Italy) A Giannessi (Germany) F Mayer	6	6
(Netherlands) W Koolhof (New Zealand) A Sitak	6^{3}	3
6	(Croatia) I Dodig (Spain) M Granollers	7^{7}	6

Second round
4	(United Kingdom) J Murray (Brazil) B Soares	7^{7}	6
(New Zealand) M Daniell (Brazil) M Demoliner	6^{4}	3
Alt	(Australia) J Millman (United Kingdom) K Skupski	6^{4}	1
(Sweden) R Lindstedt (Australia) J Thompson	7^{7}	6
12	(Netherlands) J-J Rojer (Romania) H Tecău	6	6
(South Korea) H Chung (Chinese Taipei) Y-h Lu	3	2
(Italy) A Giannessi (Germany) F Mayer	3	3
6	(Croatia) I Dodig (Spain) M Granollers	6	6

Third round
4	(United Kingdom) J Murray (Brazil) B Soares	6	6
(Sweden) R Lindstedt (Australia) J Thompson	3	4
12	(Netherlands) J-J Rojer (Romania) H Tecău	6	6
6	(Croatia) I Dodig (Spain) M Granollers	4	3

Quarterfinals
4	(United Kingdom) J Murray (Brazil) B Soares	1	2
12	(Netherlands) J-J Rojer (Romania) H Tecău	6	6

=== Bottom half ===
==== Section 3 ====
First round
8	(United States) R Harrison (New Zealand) M Venus	3	3
(France) J Chardy (France) F Martin	6	6
(Poland) M Matkowski (Belarus) M Mirnyi	6^{5}	4
WC	(United States) T Fritz (United States) R Opelka	7^{7}	6
(Chile) H Podlipnik-Castillo (Belarus) A Vasilevski	3	6^{3}
(France) A Mannarino (Italy) A Seppi	6	7^{7}
(Germany) A Begemann (India) D Sharan	4	4
11	(Spain) F López (Spain) M López	6	6
13	(United States) B Baker (Croatia) N Mektić	3	4
(Tunisia) M Jaziri (Russia) A Kuznetsov	6	6
(Spain) D Marrero (France) B Paire	3	6^{3}
(Belgium) S Darcis (Israel) D Sela	6	7^{7}
WC	(United States) C Eubanks (United States) C Harrison	6	4	6
(Russia) M Youzhny (Germany) M Zverev	3	6	4
(Netherlands) R Haase (Netherlands) M Middelkoop	6	6
3	(France) P-H Herbert (France) N Mahut	3	4

Second round
(France) J Chardy (France) F Martin	6	6^{3}	7^{7}
WC	(United States) T Fritz (United States) R Opelka	2	7^{7}	6^{5}
(France) A Mannarino (Italy) A Seppi	3	2
11	(Spain) F López (Spain) M López	6	6
(Tunisia) M Jaziri (Russia) A Kuznetsov	2	1
(Belgium) S Darcis (Israel) D Sela	6	6
WC	(United States) C Eubanks (United States) C Harrison	7^{7}	3	4
(Netherlands) R Haase (Netherlands) M Middelkoop	6^{5}	6	6

Third round
(France) J Chardy (France) F Martin	4	6^{5}
11	(Spain) F López (Spain) M López	6	7^{7}
(Belgium) S Darcis (Israel) D Sela	6^{2}	3
(Netherlands) R Haase (Netherlands) M Middelkoop	7^{7}	6

Quarterfinals
11	(Spain) F López (Spain) M López	6	7
(Netherlands) R Haase (Netherlands) M Middelkoop	4	5

==== Section 4 ====
First round
5	(United States) B Bryan (United States) M Bryan	6	4	6
(Czech Republic) R Jebavý (Czech Republic) J Veselý	2	6	3
(Australia) N Kyrgios (Australia) M Reid	3	7^{7}	6
(Portugal) J Sousa (Germany) J-L Struff	6	6^{5}	4
(Austria) P Oswald (Brazil) A Sá	5	6	2
WC	(United States) A Krajicek (United States) J Withrow	7	3	6
WC	(United States) V Kirkov (United States) D Thomas	4	2
9	(Austria) O Marach (Croatia) M Pavić	6	6
16	(Australia) S Groth (Pakistan) A-u-H Qureshi	4	4
(Russia) K Khachanov (Russia) A Rublev	6	6
(India) L Paes (India) P Raja	6	6
(Serbia) J Tipsarević (Serbia) V Troicki	1	3
(France) J Benneteau (France) É Roger-Vasselin	6	6
PR	(Georgia (country)) N Basilashvili (Austria) A Haider-Maurer	4	2
(Argentina) G Durán (United Kingdom) N Skupski	3	6	3
2	(Poland) Ł Kubot (Brazil) M Melo	6	3	6

Second round
5	(United States) B Bryan (United States) M Bryan	6	6
(Australia) N Kyrgios (Australia) M Reid	1	1
WC	(United States) A Krajicek (United States) J Withrow	3	3
9	(Austria) O Marach (Croatia) M Pavić	6	6
(Russia) K Khachanov (Russia) A Rublev	6	7^{9}
(India) L Paes (India) P Raja	4	6^{7}
(France) J Benneteau (France) É Roger-Vasselin	6	7^{7}
2	(Poland) Ł Kubot (Brazil) M Melo	3	6^{2}

Third round
5	(United States) B Bryan (United States) M Bryan	4	6	6
9	(Austria) O Marach (Croatia) M Pavić	6	3	4
(Russia) K Khachanov (Russia) A Rublev	6	6^{3}	2
(France) J Benneteau (France) É Roger-Vasselin	4	7^{7}	6

Quarterfinals
5	(United States) B Bryan (United States) M Bryan	6	7
(France) J Benneteau (France) É Roger-Vasselin	3	5
