= 2017 US Open (tennis) =

- Date: August 28 – September 10
- Edition: 137th
- Category: Grand Slam (ITF)
- Draw: 128S/64D/32X
- Prize money: $50,400,000
- Surface: Hard
- Location: New York City, New York, United States
- Venue: USTA Billie Jean King National Tennis Center

Champions

Men's singles
- (Spain) Rafael Nadal

Women's singles
- (United States) Sloane Stephens

Men's doubles
- (Netherlands) Jean-Julien Rojer / (Romania) Horia Tecău

Women's doubles
- (Chinese Taipei) Chan Yung-jan / (Switzerland) Martina Hingis

Mixed doubles
- (Switzerland) Martina Hingis / (United Kingdom) Jamie Murray

Wheelchair men's singles
- (France) Stéphane Houdet

Wheelchair women's singles
- (Japan) Yui Kamiji

Wheelchair quad singles
- (United States) David Wagner

Wheelchair men's doubles
- (United Kingdom) Alfie Hewett / (United Kingdom) Gordon Reid

Wheelchair women's doubles
- (Netherlands) Marjolein Buis / (Netherlands) Diede de Groot

Wheelchair quad doubles
- (United Kingdom) Andrew Lapthorne / (United States) David Wagner

Boys' singles
- (China) Wu Yibing

Girls' singles
- (United States) Amanda Anisimova

Boys' doubles
- (Chinese Taipei) Hsu Yu-hsiou / (China) Wu Yibing

Girls' doubles
- (Serbia) Olga Danilović / (Ukraine) Marta Kostyuk

Men's champions invitational
- (United States) John McEnroe / (United States) Patrick McEnroe

Women's champions invitational
- (Belgium) Kim Clijsters / (United States) Martina Navratilova
- US Open

The 2017 US Open was the 137th edition of tennis' US Open and the fourth and final Grand Slam event of the year. It was held on outdoor hard courts at the USTA Billie Jean King National Tennis Center in New York City. Experimental rules featured in qualifying for the main draw as well as in the junior, wheelchair and exhibition events.

Stan Wawrinka and Angelique Kerber were the previous year's men's and women's singles champions. Neither managed to defend their title as Wawrinka withdrew before the start of the tournament due to a knee injury that ended his season, while Kerber lost in the first round to Naomi Osaka.

The men's singles tournament concluded with Rafael Nadal defeating Kevin Anderson in the final, while the women's singles tournament concluded with Sloane Stephens defeating Madison Keys in the final.

== Tournament ==
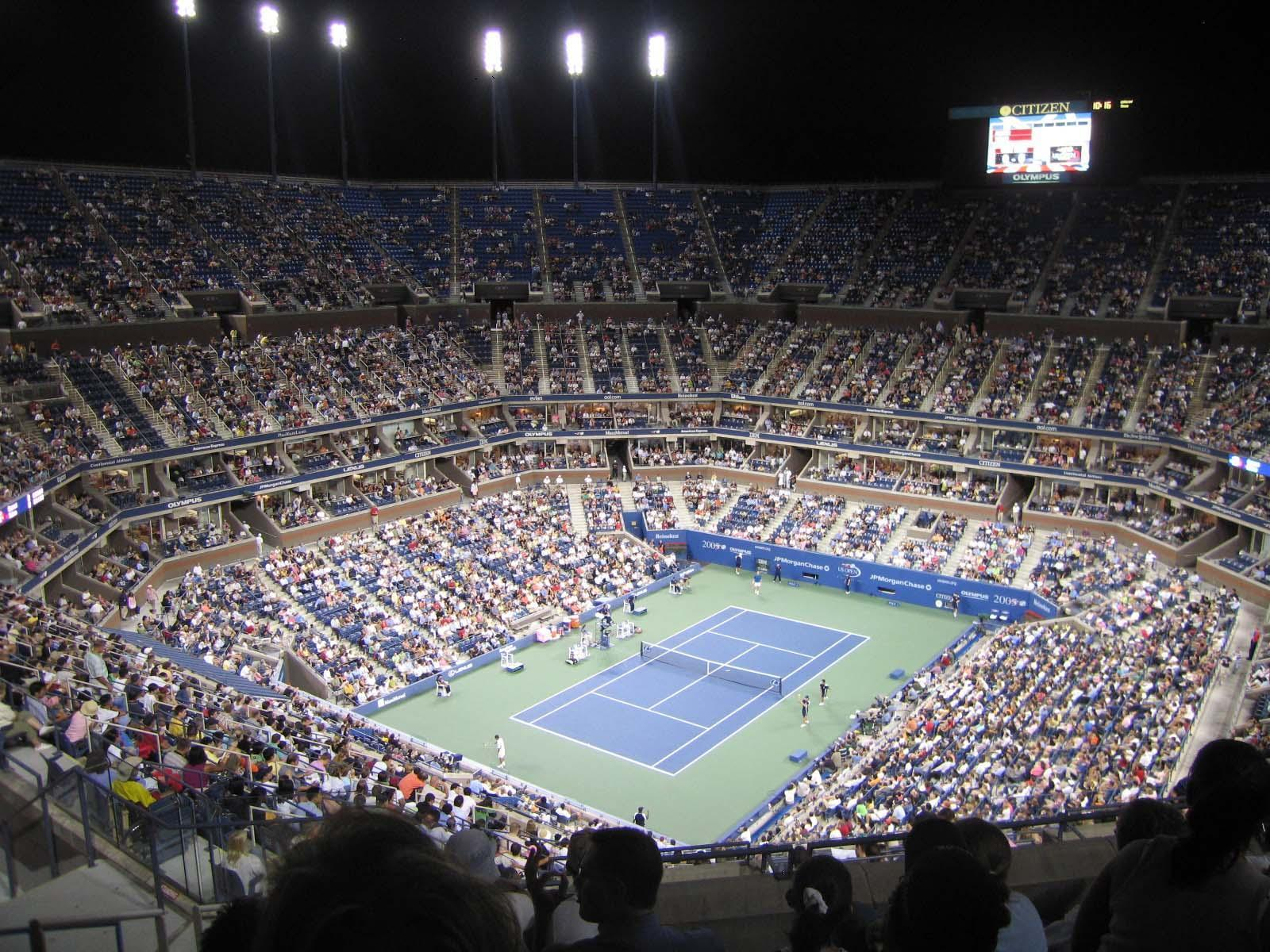
Arthur Ashe Stadium before the retractable roof was installed and where the finals of the US Open took place

The 2017 US Open was the 137th edition of the tournament and took place at the USTA Billie Jean King National Tennis Center in Flushing Meadows–Corona Park of Queens in New York City, New York, United States. The tournament was held on 15 DecoTurf hard courts.

The tournament was an event run by the International Tennis Federation (ITF) and was part of the 2017 ATP World Tour and the 2017 WTA Tour calendars under the Grand Slam category. The tournament consisted of both men's and women's singles and doubles draws as well as a mixed doubles event. There were also singles and doubles events for both boys and girls (players under 18), which were part of the Grade A category of tournaments. Additionally, there were singles and doubles wheelchair tennis events for men, women and quads.

The 2017 tournament saw the USTA try out two experimental rules. Firstly, the USTA introduced a shot clock to combat slow play and to address players going over the allotted time for warm ups and medical time outs. Secondly, coaching was allowed from the side of the court. Whilst a player was at the same end as their box they could verbally communicate, if they were at the opposite end then sign language would be allowed. This meant that coaching incidents involving Victoria Azarenka and Caroline Garcia at Wimbledon would have been allowed. The rules only applied in qualifying matches for the main draw, junior, wheelchair and legends matches.

The tournament was played on hard courts and took place over a series of 15 courts with DecoTurf surface, including the two existing main showcourts – Arthur Ashe Stadium and the new Grandstand. Louis Armstrong Stadium, one of the main stadiums used in the previous tournament, was demolished after the 2016 tournament and was replaced for the 2017 edition by a temporary stadium located next to parking lot B near the construction of the previous Louis Armstrong Stadium site.

== Broadcast ==
In the United States, the 2017 US Open will be the third year in a row under an 11-year, $825 million contract with ESPN, in which the broadcaster holds exclusive rights to the entire tournament and the US Open Series. This means that the tournament is not available on broadcast television. This also makes ESPN the exclusive U.S. broadcaster for three of the four tennis majors. In Australia, SBS won the rights to broadcast the US Open with the free to air coverage starting from the quarter finals.

=== Américas ===
- Latin America: ESPN
- Argentina: ESPN and TyC Sports
- Brazil: ESPN and SporTV
- Paraguay: ESPN and Tigo Sports
- Uruguay: ESPN and VTV

== Point and prize money distribution ==
=== Point distribution ===
Below is a series of tables for each of the competitions showing the ranking points on offer for each event.

==== Senior ====
Event	W	F	SF	QF	Round of 16	Round of 32	Round of 64	Round of 128	Q	Q3	Q2	Q1
Men's singles	2000	1200	720	360	180	90	45	10	25	16	8	0
Men's doubles	2000	1200	720	360	180	90	0	—N/a	—N/a	—N/a	—N/a	—N/a
Women's singles	2000	1300	780	430	240	130	70	10	40	30	20	2
Women's doubles	2000	1300	780	430	240	130	10	—N/a	—N/a	—N/a	—N/a	—N/a

==== Wheelchair ====
Event	W	F	SF/3rd	QF/4th
Singles	800	500	375	100
Doubles	800	500	100	—
Quad singles	800	500	375	100
Quad doubles	800	100	—	—

==== Junior ====
Event	W	F	SF	QF	Round of 16	Round of 32	Q	Q3
Boys' singles	375	270	180	120	75	30	25	20
Girls' singles	375	270	180	120	75	30	25	20
Boys' doubles	270	180	120	75	45	—	—	—
Girls' doubles	270	180	120	75	45	—	—	—

=== Prize money ===
The total prize-money compensation for the 2017 US Open is $50.4 million, a 3.7% increase on the same total last year. Of that total, a record $3.7 million goes to both the men's and women's singles champions, which is increased to 7.5 percent from last year. This made the US Open the most lucrative and highest paying tennis grand slam in the world, leapfrogging Wimbledon in total prize money fund. Prize money for the US Open qualifying tournament is also up 49.2 percent, to $2.9 million. The total prize money for the wheelchair tennis events was $200,000.

Event	W	F	SF	QF	Round of 16	Round of 32	Round of 64	Round of 128	Q3	Q2	Q1
Singles	$3,700,000	$1,825,000	$920,000	$470,000	$253,625	$144,000	$86,000	$50,000	$16,350	$10,900	$5,606
Doubles	$675,000	$340,000	$160,000	$82,000	$44,000	$26,500	$16,500	—N/a	—N/a	—N/a	—N/a
Mixed doubles	$150,000	$70,000	$30,000	$15,000	$10,000	$5,000	—N/a	—N/a	—N/a	—N/a	—N/a

== Singles players ==
Men's singles

Champion		Runner-up	
(Spain) Rafael Nadal [1]		(South Africa) Kevin Anderson [28]	
Semifinals out
(Argentina) Juan Martín del Potro [24]		(Spain) Pablo Carreño Busta [12]	
Quarterfinals out
(Russia) Andrey Rublev	(Switzerland) Roger Federer [3]	(United States) Sam Querrey [17]	(Argentina) Diego Schwartzman [29]
4th round out
(Ukraine) Alexandr Dolgopolov	(Belgium) David Goffin [9]	(Germany) Philipp Kohlschreiber [33]	(Austria) Dominic Thiem [6]
(Germany) Mischa Zverev [23]	(Italy) Paolo Lorenzi	(Canada) Denis Shapovalov (Q)	(France) Lucas Pouille [16]
3rd round out
(Argentina) Leonardo Mayer (LL)	(Serbia) Viktor Troicki	(France) Gaël Monfils [18]	(Bosnia and Herzegovina) Damir Džumhur
(Spain) Feliciano López [31]	(Australia) John Millman (PR)	(Spain) Roberto Bautista Agut [11]	(France) Adrian Mannarino [30]
(Moldova) Radu Albot (Q)	(United States) John Isner [10]	(Italy) Thomas Fabbiano	(Croatia) Borna Ćorić
(United Kingdom) Kyle Edmund	(France) Nicolas Mahut (Q)	(Kazakhstan) Mikhail Kukushkin (Q)	(Croatia) Marin Čilić [5]
2nd round out
(Japan) Taro Daniel	(Japan) Yūichi Sugita	(Italy) Stefano Travaglia (Q)	(Czech Republic) Tomáš Berdych [15]
(Argentina) Guido Pella	(United States) Donald Young	(Germany) Cedrik-Marcel Stebe (Q)	(Bulgaria) Grigor Dimitrov [7]
(Russia) Mikhail Youzhny	(Spain) Fernando Verdasco	(Colombia) Santiago Giraldo	(Tunisia) Malek Jaziri
(Germany) Dustin Brown	(Spain) Adrián Menéndez-Maceiras (Q)	(United States) Bjorn Fratangelo (WC)	(United States) Taylor Fritz (WC)
(Israel) Dudi Sela	(Chinese Taipei) Lu Yen-hsun	(France) Benoît Paire	(South Korea) Chung Hyeon
(Australia) Jordan Thompson	(Luxembourg) Gilles Müller [19]	(Latvia) Ernests Gulbis (PR)	(Germany) Alexander Zverev [4]
(France) Jo-Wilfried Tsonga [8]	(United States) Steve Johnson	(Spain) Albert Ramos Viñolas [20]	(United Kingdom) Cameron Norrie (Q)
(United States) Jared Donaldson	(Russia) Evgeny Donskoy	(Serbia) Janko Tipsarević	(Germany) Florian Mayer
1st round out
(Serbia) Dušan Lajović	(United States) Tommy Paul (WC)	(France) Geoffrey Blancaneaux (WC)	(France) Richard Gasquet [26]
(Italy) Fabio Fognini [22]	(Slovakia) Norbert Gombos	(Germany) Jan-Lennard Struff	(United States) Ryan Harrison
(France) Julien Benneteau	(Belgium) Steve Darcis	(Germany) Maximilian Marterer (Q)	(France) Jérémy Chardy
(Uruguay) Pablo Cuevas [27]	(Argentina) Nicolás Kicker	(United Kingdom) Aljaž Bedene	(Czech Republic) Václav Šafránek (Q)
(United States) Frances Tiafoe	(Slovenia) Blaž Kavčič	(Canada) Vasek Pospisil	(Russia) Andrey Kuznetsov
(United States) Tim Smyczek (Q)	(France) Vincent Millot (Q)	(Brazil) Thiago Monteiro	(Australia) Nick Kyrgios [14]
(Italy) Andreas Seppi	(Brazil) Thomaz Bellucci	(United States) Patrick Kypson (WC)	(Switzerland) Henri Laaksonen
(Lithuania) Ričardas Berankis (PR)	(Croatia) Ivo Karlović	(Cyprus) Marcos Baghdatis	(Australia) Alex de Minaur (WC)
(France) Gilles Simon	(United States) Christopher Eubanks (WC)	(United States) Ernesto Escobedo	(Russia) Karen Khachanov [25]
(United States) Thai-Son Kwiatkowski (WC)	(Slovakia) Lukáš Lacko (LL)	(Argentina) Horacio Zeballos	(France) Pierre-Hugues Herbert
(United States) Jack Sock [13]	(Australia) John-Patrick Smith (Q)	(Portugal) João Sousa	(Australia) Bernard Tomic
(United States) JC Aragone (Q)	(Italy) Alessandro Giannessi	(Czech Republic) Jiří Veselý	(Barbados) Darian King (Q)
(Romania) Marius Copil	(Russia) Daniil Medvedev	(Spain) Nicolás Almagro	(Netherlands) Robin Haase [32]
(Uzbekistan) Denis Istomin	(Hungary) Márton Fucsovics	(Russia) Dmitry Tursunov (PR)	(United States) Evan King (Q)
(Belgium) Ruben Bemelmans	(Georgia (country)) Nikoloz Basilashvili	(Austria) Andreas Haider-Maurer (PR)	(Spain) David Ferrer [21]
(Argentina) Carlos Berlocq	(Australia) Thanasi Kokkinakis (PR)	(Brazil) Rogério Dutra Silva	(United States) Tennys Sandgren

Women's singles

Champion		Runner-up	
(United States) Sloane Stephens (PR)		(United States) Madison Keys [15]	
Semifinals out
(United States) CoCo Vandeweghe [20]		(United States) Venus Williams [9]	
Quarterfinals out
(Czech Republic) Karolína Plíšková [1]	(Estonia) Kaia Kanepi (Q)	(Czech Republic) Petra Kvitová [13]	(Latvia) Anastasija Sevastova [16]
4th round out
(United States) Jennifer Brady	(Czech Republic) Lucie Šafářová	(Ukraine) Elina Svitolina [4]	(Russia) Daria Kasatkina
(Spain) Carla Suárez Navarro	(Spain) Garbiñe Muguruza [3]	(Germany) Julia Görges [30]	(Russia) Maria Sharapova (WC)
3rd round out
(China) Zhang Shuai [27]	(Romania) Monica Niculescu	(Poland) Agnieszka Radwańska [10]	(Japan) Kurumi Nara
(United States) Shelby Rogers	(Russia) Elena Vesnina [17]	(Latvia) Jeļena Ostapenko [12]	(Japan) Naomi Osaka
(Russia) Ekaterina Makarova	(Greece) Maria Sakkari	(France) Caroline Garcia [18]	(Slovakia) Magdaléna Rybáriková [31]
(Serbia) Aleksandra Krunić	(Australia) Ashleigh Barty	(Croatia) Donna Vekić	(United States) Sofia Kenin (WC)
2nd round out
(United States) Nicole Gibbs (Q)	(Japan) Risa Ozaki	(Czech Republic) Barbora Strýcová [23]	(Romania) Ana Bogdan
(Kazakhstan) Yulia Putintseva	(Tunisia) Ons Jabeur	(Japan) Nao Hibino	(Russia) Svetlana Kuznetsova [8]
(Russia) Evgeniya Rodina	(Australia) Daria Gavrilova [25]	(Belgium) Kirsten Flipkens	(Germany) Tatjana Maria
(Romania) Sorana Cîrstea	(United States) Christina McHale	(Belgium) Yanina Wickmayer	(Czech Republic) Denisa Allertová
(Denmark) Caroline Wozniacki [5]	(Croatia) Mirjana Lučić-Baroni [29]	(Australia) Arina Rodionova (WC)	(France) Océane Dodin
(France) Alizé Cornet	(Russia) Ekaterina Alexandrova	(Czech Republic) Kristýna Plíšková	(China) Duan Yingying
(Australia) Ajla Tomljanović (PR)	(China) Zheng Saisai	(Belarus) Aliaksandra Sasnovich	(Slovakia) Dominika Cibulková [11]
(Ukraine) Kateryna Kozlova (Q)	(China) Peng Shuai [22]	(United States) Sachia Vickery (Q)	(Hungary) Tímea Babos
1st round out
(Poland) Magda Linette	(Paraguay) Verónica Cepede Royg	(United States) Danielle Lao (Q)	(Germany) Sabine Lisicki (PR)
(Japan) Misaki Doi	(Germany) Andrea Petkovic	(United States) Taylor Townsend (WC)	(France) Kristina Mladenovic [14]
(Croatia) Petra Martić	(Russia) Sofya Zhuk (Q)	(United States) Brienne Minor (WC)	(United States) Alison Riske
(Estonia) Anett Kontaveit [26]	(United States) Catherine Bellis	(Spain) Sara Sorribes Tormo	(Czech Republic) Markéta Vondroušová
(Czech Republic) Kateřina Siniaková	(Canada) Eugenie Bouchard	(United States) Kayla Day (WC)	(United States) Allie Kiick (Q)
(Russia) Anna Blinkova (Q)	(United States) Madison Brengle	(United States) Ashley Kratzer (WC)	(Belgium) Elise Mertens
(Spain) Lara Arruabarrena	(Netherlands) Lesley Kerkhove (Q)	(China) Wang Qiang	(Russia) Anastasia Pavlyuchenkova [19]
(Ukraine) Lesia Tsurenko [28]	(Italy) Francesca Schiavone	(Sweden) Rebecca Peterson (Q)	(Germany) Angelique Kerber [6]
(Romania) Mihaela Buzărnescu (Q)	(Germany) Mona Barthel	(Turkey) İpek Soylu (Q)	(Puerto Rico) Monica Puig
(Netherlands) Kiki Bertens [24]	(Netherlands) Richèl Hogenkamp	(France) Pauline Parmentier	(Slovakia) Viktória Kužmová (Q)
(Serbia) Jelena Janković	(United Kingdom) Heather Watson	(Germany) Anna Zaja (Q)	(Czech Republic) Tereza Martincová (Q)
(Italy) Camila Giorgi	(Japan) Misa Eguchi (PR)	(United States) Claire Liu (Q)	(United States) Varvara Lepchenko
(United Kingdom) Johanna Konta [7]	(Sweden) Johanna Larsson	(Belgium) Alison Van Uytvanck	(Germany) Annika Beck
(Croatia) Ana Konjuh [21]	(United States) Julia Boserup	(Italy) Roberta Vinci	(Slovakia) Jana Čepelová
(Germany) Carina Witthöft	(Romania) Irina-Camelia Begu	(Brazil) Beatriz Haddad Maia	(France) Amandine Hesse (WC)
(United States) Lauren Davis [32]	(Russia) Natalia Vikhlyantseva	(Switzerland) Viktorija Golubic	(Romania) Simona Halep [2]

== Doubles seeds ==
=== Men's doubles ===
Team		Rank^{1}	Seed
(Finland) Henri Kontinen	(Australia) John Peers	3	1
(Poland) Łukasz Kubot	(Brazil) Marcelo Melo	7	2
(France) Pierre-Hugues Herbert	(France) Nicolas Mahut	13	3
(United Kingdom) Jamie Murray	(Brazil) Bruno Soares	13	4
(United States) Bob Bryan	(United States) Mike Bryan	18	5
(Croatia) Ivan Dodig	(Spain) Marcel Granollers	25	6
(South Africa) Raven Klaasen	(United States) Rajeev Ram	28	7
(United States) Ryan Harrison	(New Zealand) Michael Venus	32	8
(Austria) Oliver Marach	(Croatia) Mate Pavić	35	9
(India) Rohan Bopanna	(Uruguay) Pablo Cuevas	42	10
(Spain) Feliciano López	(Spain) Marc López	45	11
(Netherlands) Jean-Julien Rojer	(Romania) Horia Tecău	57	12
(United States) Brian Baker	(Croatia) Nikola Mektić	67	13
(Chile) Julio Peralta	(Argentina) Horacio Zeballos	77	14
(Mexico) Santiago González	(United States) Donald Young	78	15
(Australia) Sam Groth	(Pakistan) Aisam-ul-Haq Qureshi	80	16

^{1}Rankings as of August 21, 2017.

=== Women's doubles ===
Team		Rank^{1}	Seed
(Russia) Ekaterina Makarova	(Russia) Elena Vesnina	6	1
(Chinese Taipei) Chan Yung-jan	(Switzerland) Martina Hingis	11	2
(Czech Republic) Lucie Šafářová	(Czech Republic) Barbora Strýcová	12	3
(India) Sania Mirza	(China) Peng Shuai	18	4
(Hungary) Tímea Babos	(Czech Republic) Andrea Hlaváčková	26	5
(Australia) Ashleigh Barty	(Australia) Casey Dellacqua	29	6
(Czech Republic) Lucie Hradecká	(Czech Republic) Kateřina Siniaková	31	7
(Germany) Anna-Lena Grönefeld	(Czech Republic) Květa Peschke	40	8
(Canada) Gabriela Dabrowski	(China) Xu Yifan	48	9
(United States) Abigail Spears	(Slovenia) Katarina Srebotnik	49	10
(Netherlands) Kiki Bertens	(Sweden) Johanna Larsson	55	11
(Chinese Taipei) Hsieh Su-wei	(Romania) Monica Niculescu	58	12
(France) Kristina Mladenovic	(Russia) Anastasia Pavlyuchenkova	63	13
(Slovenia) Andreja Klepač	(Spain) María José Martínez Sánchez	64	14
(Japan) Makoto Ninomiya	(Czech Republic) Renata Voráčová	71	15
(Japan) Nao Hibino	(Poland) Alicja Rosolska	77	16

^{1}Rankings as of August 21, 2017.

=== Mixed doubles ===
Team		Rank^{1}	Seed
(Switzerland) Martina Hingis	(United Kingdom) Jamie Murray	11	1
(India) Sania Mirza	(Croatia) Ivan Dodig	19	2
(Chinese Taipei) Chan Hao-ching	(New Zealand) Michael Venus	24	3
(Hungary) Tímea Babos	(Brazil) Bruno Soares	26	4
(Australia) Casey Dellacqua	(United States) Rajeev Ram	27	5
(Czech Republic) Andrea Hlaváčková	(France) Édouard Roger-Vasselin	38	6
(Canada) Gabriela Dabrowski	(India) Rohan Bopanna	39	7
(Czech Republic) Lucie Hradecká	(Poland) Marcin Matkowski	45	8

^{1}Rankings as of August 21, 2017.

== Events ==
=== Men's singles ===
- (Spain) Rafael Nadal def. (South Africa) Kevin Anderson, 6–3, 6–3, 6–4

=== Women's singles ===
- (United States) Sloane Stephens def. (United States) Madison Keys, 6–3, 6–0

=== Men's doubles ===
- (Netherlands) Jean-Julien Rojer / (Romania) Horia Tecău def. (Spain) Feliciano López / (Spain) Marc López, 6–4, 6–3

=== Women's doubles ===
- (Chinese Taipei) Chan Yung-jan / (Switzerland) Martina Hingis def. (Czech Republic) Lucie Hradecká / (Czech Republic) Kateřina Siniaková, 6–3, 6–2

=== Mixed doubles ===
- (Switzerland) Martina Hingis / (United Kingdom) Jamie Murray def. (Chinese Taipei) Chan Hao-ching / (New Zealand) Michael Venus, 6–1, 4–6, [10–8]

=== Junior boys' singles ===
- (China) Wu Yibing def. (Argentina) Axel Geller, 6–4, 6–4

=== Junior girls' singles ===
- (United States) Amanda Anisimova def. (United States) Coco Gauff, 6–0, 6–2

=== Junior boys' doubles ===
- (Chinese Taipei) Hsu Yu-hsiou / (China) Wu Yibing def. (Japan) Toru Horie / (Japan) Yuta Shimizu, 6–4, 5–7, [11–9]

=== Junior girls' doubles ===
- (Serbia) Olga Danilović / (Ukraine) Marta Kostyuk def. (Croatia) Lea Bošković / (China) Wang Xiyu, 6–1, 7–5

=== Men's champions doubles ===
- (United States) John McEnroe / (United States) Patrick McEnroe def. (Australia) Pat Cash / (France) Henri Leconte, 6–2, 6–4

=== Women's champions doubles ===
- (Belgium) Kim Clijsters / (United States) Martina Navratilova def. (United States) Lindsay Davenport / (United States) Mary Joe Fernández, 4–6, 6–2, [10–4]

=== Wheelchair men's singles ===
- (France) Stéphane Houdet def. (United Kingdom) Alfie Hewett, 6–2, 4–6, 6–3

=== Wheelchair women's singles ===
- (Japan) Yui Kamiji def. (Netherlands) Diede de Groot, 7–5, 6–2

=== Wheelchair quad singles ===
- (United States) David Wagner def. (United Kingdom) Andrew Lapthorne, 7–5, 3–6, 6–4

=== Wheelchair men's doubles ===
- (United Kingdom) Alfie Hewett / (United Kingdom) Gordon Reid def. (France) Stéphane Houdet / (France) Nicolas Peifer, 7–5, 6–4

=== Wheelchair women's doubles ===
- (Netherlands) Marjolein Buis / (Netherlands) Diede de Groot def. (United States) Dana Mathewson / (Netherlands) Aniek van Koot, 6–4, 6–3

=== Wheelchair quad doubles ===
- (United Kingdom) Andrew Lapthorne / (United States) David Wagner def. (Australia) Dylan Alcott / (United States) Bryan Barten, 7–5, 6–2

== Wild card entries ==
The following players were given wildcards to the main draw based on internal selection and recent performances.

=== Men's doubles ===
- (United States) William Blumberg / (United States) Spencer Papa
- (United States) Christopher Eubanks / (United States) Christian Harrison
- (United States) Taylor Fritz / (United States) Reilly Opelka
- (United States) Steve Johnson / (United States) Tommy Paul
- (United States) Vasil Kirkov / (United States) Danny Thomas
- (United States) Bradley Klahn / (United States) Scott Lipsky
- (United States) Austin Krajicek / (United States) Jackson Withrow

=== Women's doubles ===
- (United States) Kristie Ahn / (United States) Irina Falconi
- (United States) Amanda Anisimova / (United States) Emina Bektas
- (United States) Julia Boserup / (United States) Nicole Gibbs
- (United States) Jacqueline Cako / (United States) Sachia Vickery
- (United States) Kayla Day / (United States) Caroline Dolehide
- (United States) Francesca Di Lorenzo / (United States) Allie Kiick
- (United States) Taylor Johnson / (United States) Claire Liu

=== Mixed doubles ===
- (United States) Kristie Ahn / (United States) Tennys Sandgren
- (United States) Amanda Anisimova / (United States) Christian Harrison
- (United States) Jennifer Brady / (United States) Bjorn Fratangelo
- (United States) Louisa Chirico / (United States) Bradley Klahn
- (United States) Liezel Huber / (United States) Danny Thomas
- (United States) Sofia Kenin / (United States) Michael Mmoh
- (United States) Jamie Loeb / (United States) Mitchell Krueger
- (United States) Nicole Melichar / (United States) Jackson Withrow

Preceded by 2017 Wimbledon Championships	Grand Slams	Succeeded by 2018 Australian Open
