= Spencer Papa =

American tennis player

- Country (sports): United States
- Residence: Newport Beach, United States
- Born: 22 October 1995 (age 31) Edmond, United States
- Height: 1.88 m (6 ft 2 in)
- Plays: Right-handed (two-handed backhand)
- College: Oklahoma
- Coach: Nick Crowell
- Prize money: US $19,700

Singles
- Career record: 0–0 (at ATP Tour level, Grand Slam level, and in Davis Cup)
- Career titles: 0
- Highest ranking: No. 858 (27 October 2014)

Doubles
- Career record: 0–1 (at ATP Tour level, Grand Slam level, and in Davis Cup)
- Career titles: 0
- Highest ranking: No. 1,233 (9 November 2026)
- Current ranking: No. 1,233 (9 November 2026)

Grand Slam doubles results
- US Open: 1R (2017)
- Last updated on: 9 November 2026.

Spencer Papa (born 22 October 1995) is an American tennis player. He has a career high ATP singles ranking of No. 858 achieved on 27 October 2014 and a doubles ranking of No. 1,233 achieved on 9 November 2026.

Papa made his ATP World Tour main draw debut at the 2017 US Open after receiving a wild card for the doubles tournament, partnering William Blumberg.
