= Estela Perez-Somarriba =

Spanish tennis player (born 1998)

- Full name: Maria Estela Perez-Somarriba
- Country (sports): Spain
- Born: July 25, 1998 (age 28) Madrid, Spain
- Height: 5 ft 5 in (1.65 m)
- Plays: Right-handed (two-handed backhand)
- College: Miami
- Prize money: $12,956

Singles
- Career record: 73–38
- Career titles: 0
- Highest ranking: No. 533 (23 August 2021)

Doubles
- Career record: 12–15
- Career titles: 0
- Highest ranking: No. 915 (28 September 2015)

Maria Estela Perez-Somarriba is a Spanish former tennis player. She reached two finals on the ITF Women's Circuit and played college tennis at the University of Miami.

== Early years ==
Perez-Somarriba was born to Felipe Perez-Somarriba and Maria Jose Yravedra on July 25, 1998 and grew up in Madrid, Spain. She attended high school at Instituto Mirasierra in Madrid.

== College ==
Perez-Somarriba could easily have turned pro after high school, but she chose to continue her tennis career at a college, and one across the Atlantic in Florida, at the University of Miami. Although the decision was not an easy one, it has paid off. As an unseeded freshman, she made it to the semi-finals of the 2017 NCAA Division I Tennis Championships in the singles division, only to fall to Belinda Woolcock. She made it to the Sweet Sixteen as a sophomore; her NCAA single record stands at 12–2.

She reached the finals of the NCAA Division I Women's Tennis Championship in the 2019 singles category, and won the event, defeating Katarina Jokić.

Perez-Somarriba, who was named the top tennis player in the ACC the last two years, also won more singles matches than anyone else in NCAA Division I in 2018–19, with a record of 43–5. She is the second Hurricanes woman to win the national title; Audra Cohen won the title in 2007. Her potential defense of her title in the spring of 2020 was interrupted by the COVID-19 pandemic, which disrupted the conclusion of winter sports seasons, and all spring sports. However, the NCAA permitted schools to offer seniors an additional year of eligibility. Miami made that offer, and Perez-Somarriba became the first Miami athlete to accept the offer, so she continued her studies as a graduate student, and competed on the tennis team in 2021. She will also be able to compete as a professional and the NCAA does allow "...college athletes to participate in professional tournaments as long as the athletes adhere to the strict rules regarding agents and prize money...".

She was named the winner of the Honda Sports Award as the nation's best collegiate female tennis player in 2019.

== ITF Circuit finals ==
=== Doubles: 2 (2 runner-ups) ===
Legend $25,000 tournaments $10,000 tournaments	Finals by surface Hard (0–1) Clay (0–1)

Result	Date	Tournament	Tier	Surface	Partner	Opponents	Score
Loss	Sep 2014	ITF Madrid, Spain	10k	Hard	(Spain) Marta Gonzales Encinas	(Spain) Aliona Bolsova (Spain) Olga Sáez Larra	1–6, 4–6
Loss	Aug 2015	ITF Las Palmas, Spain	10k	Clay	(Spain) Marta Gonzales Encinas	(Netherlands) Chayenne Ewijk (Netherlands) Rosalie van der Hoek	6–7^{(5)}, 0–6
