= 2022 Hall of Fame Open – Singles =

Singles
- 2022 Hall of Fame Open

Final
- Champion: (United States) Maxime Cressy
- Runner-up: (Kazakhstan) Alexander Bublik
- Score: 2–6, 6–3, 7–6^{(7–3)}

Details
- Draw: 28 (4 Q / 3 WC )
- Seeds: 8

Events
Singles	Doubles
← 2021 ·	Hall of Fame Open	· 2023 →

Maxime Cressy defeated Alexander Bublik in the final, 2–6, 6–3, 7–6^{(7–3)} to win the men's singles tennis title at the 2022 Hall of Fame Open. It was his maiden ATP Tour title.

Kevin Anderson was the reigning champion, but retired from professional tennis in May 2022.

== Seeds ==
The top four seeds received a bye into the second round.

1. (Canada) Félix Auger-Aliassime (second round)
2. (United States) John Isner (semifinals)
3. (Kazakhstan) Alexander Bublik (final)
4. (United States) Maxime Cressy (champion)
5. (France) Benjamin Bonzi (quarterfinals)
6. (United Kingdom) Andy Murray (quarterfinals)
7. (Czech Republic) Jiří Veselý (second round, withdrew)
8. (Australia) James Duckworth (quarterfinals)

== Draw ==
=== Key ===
- Q = Qualifier
- WC = Wild card
- LL = Lucky loser
- Alt = Alternate
- SE = Special exempt
- PR = Protected ranking
- ITF = ITF entry
- JE = Junior exempt
- w/o = Walkover
- r = Retired
- d = Defaulted
- SR = Special ranking

=== Finals ===
Semifinals
(Australia) Jason Kubler	3	2
3	(Kazakhstan) Alexander Bublik	6	6
4	(United States) Maxime Cressy	6	4	6
2	(United States) John Isner	2	6	3

Final
3	(Kazakhstan) Alexander Bublik	6	3	6^{3}
4	(United States) Maxime Cressy	2	6	7^{7}

=== Top half ===
First round
(Australia) J Kubler	6	6
(Australia) J Thompson	2	3
(France) Q Halys	7^{7}	6
(Australia) A Popyrin	6^{5}	3
Q	(United Kingdom) L Broady	2	6	2
8	(Australia) J Duckworth	6	4	6
(Moldova) R Albot	1	6^{2}
(United States) J Sock	6	7^{7}
WC	(Australia) M Purcell	6	1	7
(France) A Mannarino	3	6	5
(United States) S Querrey	2	0
6/WC	(United Kingdom) A Murray	6	6

Second round
1/WC	(Canada) F Auger-Aliassime	6	3	6^{4}
(Australia) J Kubler	4	6	7^{7}
(France) Q Halys	5	6	2
8	(Australia) J Duckworth	7	3	6
3	(Kazakhstan) A Bublik	6	3	6
(United States) J Sock	3	6	2
WC	(Australia) M Purcell	6	2	1
6/WC	(United Kingdom) A Murray	4	6	6

Quarterfinals
(Australia) J Kubler	7	7^{7}
8	(Australia) J Duckworth	5	6^{3}
3	(Kazakhstan) A Bublik	7	6
6/WC	(United Kingdom) A Murray	5	4

Semifinals
(Australia) J Kubler	3	2
3	(Kazakhstan) A Bublik	6	6

=== Bottom half ===
First round
7	(Czech Republic) J Veselý	6	6
(Spain) F López	4	2
(United States) S Kozlov	5	3
(United States) S Johnson	7	6
Q	(United States) M Krueger	7^{9}	4	6
(Netherlands) T van Rijthoven	6^{7}	6	3
5	(France) B Bonzi	2	6	6
Q	(United States) W Blumberg	6	3	2
(Germany) D Koepfer	4	5
Q	(United States) C Eubanks	6	7
(Germany) P Gojowczyk	7	6
(France) U Humbert	5	4

Second round
7	(Czech Republic) J Veselý
(United States) S Johnson	w/o
Q	(United States) M Krueger	3	4
4	(United States) M Cressy	6	6
5	(France) B Bonzi	6	7^{7}
Q	(United States) C Eubanks	4	6^{5}
(Germany) P Gojowczyk	3	6^{6}
2	(United States) J Isner	6	7^{8}

Quarterfinals
(United States) S Johnson	7^{7}	4	4
4	(United States) M Cressy	6^{3}	6	6
5	(France) B Bonzi	6^{2}	7^{8}	6^{5}
2	(United States) J Isner	7^{7}	6^{6}	7^{7}

Semifinals
4	(United States) M Cressy	6	4	6
2	(United States) J Isner	2	6	3

== Qualifying ==
=== Seeds ===
1. (United States) Ernesto Escobedo (first round)
2. (United Kingdom) Liam Broady (qualified)
3. (United States) Mitchell Krueger (qualified)
4. (United States) Christopher Eubanks (qualified)
5. (India) Ramkumar Ramanathan (first round)
6. (Chinese Taipei) Wu Tung-lin (first round)
7. (Netherlands) Gijs Brouwer (first round)
8. (Bosnia and Herzegovina) Mirza Bašić (qualifying competition)

=== Qualifiers ===
1. (United States) William Blumberg
2. (United Kingdom) Liam Broady
3. (United States) Mitchell Krueger
4. (United States) Christopher Eubanks

=== Draw ===
==== First qualifier ====
First round
1	(United States) Ernesto Escobedo	6^{1}	1
Alt	(United States) Noah Rubin	7^{7}	6
WC	(United States) William Blumberg	3	7	6
5	(India) Ramkumar Ramanathan	6	5	4

Qualifying competition
Alt	(United States) Noah Rubin	6	3	2
WC	(United States) William Blumberg	4	6	6

==== Second qualifier ====
First round
2	(United Kingdom) Liam Broady	6	6
WC	(United States) Evan King	3	2
(United States) Brandon Holt	4	6	7
7	(Netherlands) Gijs Brouwer	6	3	5

Qualifying competition
2	(United Kingdom) Liam Broady	6	6
(United States) Brandon Holt	1	3

==== Third qualifier ====
First round
3	(United States) Mitchell Krueger	3	6	6
(United States) Evan Zhu	6	4	1
(United States) Gage Brymer	2	6	7^{7}
6	(Chinese Taipei) Wu Tung-lin	6	3	6^{3}

Qualifying competition
3	(United States) Mitchell Krueger	6	6
(United States) Gage Brymer	1	4

==== Fourth qualifier ====
First round
4	(United States) Christopher Eubanks	6	6
(Serbia) Peđa Krstin	0	2
(Chinese Taipei) Jason Jung	3	4
8	(Bosnia and Herzegovina) Mirza Bašić	6	6

Qualifying competition
4	(United States) Christopher Eubanks	7^{8}	7
8	(Bosnia and Herzegovina) Mirza Bašić	6^{6}	5
