= 2022 Hall of Fame Open – Doubles =

Doubles
- 2022 Hall of Fame Open

Final
- Champions: (United States) William Blumberg (United States) Steve Johnson
- Runners-up: (South Africa) Raven Klaasen (Brazil) Marcelo Melo
- Score: 6–4, 7–5

Events
Singles	Doubles
← 2021 ·	Hall of Fame Open	· 2023 →

Defending champion William Blumberg and his partner Steve Johnson defeated Raven Klaasen and Marcelo Melo in the final, 6–4, 7–5 to win the men's doubles tennis title at the 2022 Hall of Fame Open.

Blumburg and Jack Sock were the reigning champions, but Sock did not participate.

== Seeds ==
1. (South Africa) Raven Klaasen / (Brazil) Marcelo Melo (final)
2. (Mexico) Hans Hach Verdugo / (United States) Hunter Reese (first round)
3. (United States) Nathaniel Lammons / (United States) Jackson Withrow (quarterfinals)
4. (United States) William Blumberg / (United States) Steve Johnson (champions)

== Draw ==
=== Key ===
- Q = Qualifier
- WC = Wild card
- LL = Lucky loser
- Alt = Alternate
- SE = Special exempt
- PR = Protected ranking
- ITF = ITF entry
- JE = Junior exempt
- w/o = Walkover
- r = Retired
- d = Defaulted
- SR = Special ranking

=== Draw ===
First round
1	(South Africa) R Klaasen (Brazil) M Melo	6	6
(Serbia) I Sabanov (Serbia) M Sabanov	2	4
WC	(Canada) F Auger-Aliassime (France) B Bonzi	6	6
(Germany) P Gojowczyk (Germany) D Koepfer	1	4
3	(United States) N Lammons (United States) J Withrow	7	6
WC	(United States) R Ciamarra (United States) S Querrey	5	3
(United States) R Galloway (United States) A Lawson	6	3	[10]
(France) Q Halys (France) A Mannarino	3	6	[7]
(Australia) M Purcell (Netherlands) T van Rijthoven	7^{7}	7^{7}
(United States) M Schnur (New Zealand) A Sitak	6^{2}	6^{3}
(Australia) J Kubler (Australia) J Thompson	4	6	[9]
4	(United States) W Blumberg (United States) S Johnson	6	3	[11]
(United States) N Monroe (France) F Reboul	3	5
(Moldova) R Albot (Philippines) T Huey	6	7
(India) R Ramanathan (Australia) J-P Smith	6	6
2	(Mexico) H Hach Verdugo (United States) H Reese	3	4

Quarterfinals
1	(South Africa) R Klaasen (Brazil) M Melo	6	6
WC	(Canada) F Auger-Aliassime (France) B Bonzi	4	2
3	(United States) N Lammons (United States) J Withrow	6	6^{4}	[10]
(United States) R Galloway (United States) A Lawson	4	7^{7}	[12]
(Australia) M Purcell (Netherlands) T van Rijthoven	6^{3}	3
4	(United States) W Blumberg (United States) S Johnson	7^{7}	6
(Moldova) R Albot (Philippines) T Huey	1	4
(India) R Ramanathan (Australia) J-P Smith	6	6

Semifinals
1	(South Africa) R Klaasen (Brazil) M Melo	4	6	[11]
(United States) R Galloway (United States) A Lawson	6	3	[9]
4	(United States) W Blumberg (United States) S Johnson	6	6
(India) R Ramanathan (Australia) J-P Smith	4	4

Final
1	(South Africa) R Klaasen (Brazil) M Melo	4	5
4	(United States) W Blumberg (United States) S Johnson	6	7
