= 2013 Copa Internacional de Tenis Total Digest – Doubles =

Doubles
- 2013 Copa Internacional de Tenis Total Digest

Final
- Champions: (Australia) Carsten Ball (Australia) Chris Guccione
- Runners-up: (Australia) Jordan Kerr (Australia) John-Patrick Smith
- Score: 6–3, 3–6, [11–9]

Events
Singles	Doubles
Copa Internacional de Tenis Total Digest

Carsten Ball and Chris Guccione won the first edition of the tournament 6–3, 3–6, [11–9] in the final against Jordan Kerr and John-Patrick Smith.

== Seeds ==
1. (Thailand) Sanchai Ratiwatana / (Thailand) Sonchat Ratiwatana (semifinals)
2. (United States) James Cerretani / (Canada) Adil Shamasdin (semifinals)
3. (Brazil) Marcelo Demoliner / (Brazil) André Sá (first round)
4. (Australia) Jordan Kerr / (Australia) John-Patrick Smith (final)

== Draw ==
=== Key ===
- Q = Qualifier
- WC = Wild card
- LL = Lucky loser
- Alt = Alternate
- SE = Special exempt
- PR = Protected ranking
- ITF = ITF entry
- JE = Junior exempt
- w/o = Walkover
- r = Retired
- d = Defaulted
- SR = Special ranking

=== Draw ===
First round
1	(Thailand) Sa Ratiwatana (Thailand) So Ratiwatana	6	6
(Israel) D Sela (Israel) A Weintraub	3	1
(Croatia) M Draganja (Croatia) M Pavić	6	6
WC	(Mexico) Alejandro Moreno Figueroa (Mexico) M Sánchez	3	4
3	(Brazil) M Demoliner (Brazil) A Sá	6^{6}	6	[10]
(Slovakia) A Martin (Croatia) F Škugor	7^{8}	3	[12]
(Australia) C Ball (Australia) C Guccione	6	6^{6}	[10]
(Philippines) R Gonzales (Australia) Chris Letcher	4	7^{8}	[4]
(Chinese Taipei) H-h Lee (Chinese Taipei) H-y Peng	6	6
(Australia) M Barton (Australia) G Jones	4	4
(Montenegro) G Tošić (United States) D Zivkovic	3	2
4	(Australia) J Kerr (Australia) J-P Smith	6	6
WC	(Mexico) M Gallardo Valles (Mexico) MÁ Reyes-Varela	6^{6}	3
(India) P Raja (India) D Sharan	7^{8}	6
WC	(France) G Mina (Mexico) Santiago Sierra	2	3
2	(United States) J Cerretani (Canada) A Shamasdin	6	6

Quarterfinals
1	(Thailand) Sa Ratiwatana (Thailand) So Ratiwatana	6^{4}	6	[11]
(Croatia) M Draganja (Croatia) M Pavić	7^{7}	3	[9]
(Slovakia) A Martin (Croatia) F Škugor	3	6^{3}
(Australia) C Ball (Australia) C Guccione	6	7^{7}
(Chinese Taipei) H-h Lee (Chinese Taipei) H-y Peng	6	6^{5}	[7]
4	(Australia) J Kerr (Australia) J-P Smith	4	7^{7}	[10]
(India) P Raja (India) D Sharan	2	6	[10]
2	(United States) J Cerretani (Canada) A Shamasdin	6	4	[12]

Semifinals
1	(Thailand) Sa Ratiwatana (Thailand) So Ratiwatana	4	6^{1}
(Australia) C Ball (Australia) C Guccione	6	7^{7}
4	(Australia) J Kerr (Australia) J-P Smith	6	4	[10]
2	(United States) J Cerretani (Canada) A Shamasdin	3	6	[8]

Final
(Australia) C Ball (Australia) C Guccione	6	3	[11]
4	(Australia) J Kerr (Australia) J-P Smith	3	6	[9]
