= 2013 Copa Internacional de Tenis Total Digest =

- Date: 15 – 21 April
- Edition: 1st
- Draw: 32S / 16D
- Prize money: $35,000+H
- Surface: Hard
- Location: Mexico City, Mexico

Champions

Singles
- (Slovakia) Andrej Martin

Doubles
- (Australia) Carsten Ball / (Australia) Chris Guccione
- Copa Internacional de Tenis Total Digest

The 2013 Copa Internacional de Tenis Total Digest was a professional tennis tournament played on hardcourts. It was the first edition of the tournament which was part of the 2013 ATP Challenger Tour. It took place in Mexico City, Mexico between 15 and 21 April 2013.

== Singles main draw entrants ==
=== Seeds ===
| Country | Player | Rank^{1} | Seed |
|---|---|---|---|
| TPE | Lu Yen-hsun | 74 | 1 |
| ISR | Dudi Sela | 106 | 2 |
| USA | Rajeev Ram | 112 | 3 |
| FRA | Adrian Mannarino | 120 | 4 |
| JPN | Yūichi Sugita | 138 | 5 |
| CAN | Vasek Pospisil | 141 | 6 |
| USA | Donald Young | 160 | 7 |
| TPE | Jimmy Wang | 162 | 8 |

- ^{1} Rankings are as of April 8, 2013.

=== Other entrants ===
The following players received wildcards into the singles main draw:

- (France) Antoine Benneteau
- (Mexico) Miguel Gallardo-Valles
- (Mexico) Eduardo Peralta-Tello
- (Mexico) Miguel Ángel Reyes-Varela

The following players received entry as an alternate into the singles main draw:

- (Slovakia) Norbert Gombos
- (Switzerland) Michael Lammer

The following players received entry from the qualifying draw:

- (Guatemala) Christopher Díaz Figueroa
- (Australia) Chris Guccione
- (France) Gianni Mina
- (Croatia) Franko Škugor

== Doubles main draw entrants ==
=== Seeds ===
| Country | Player | Country | Player | Rank^{1} | Seed |
|---|---|---|---|---|---|
| THA | Sanchai Ratiwatana | THA | Sonchat Ratiwatana | 152 | 1 |
| USA | James Cerretani | CAN | Adil Shamasdin | 166 | 2 |
| BRA | Marcelo Demoliner | BRA | André Sá | 176 | 3 |
| AUS | Jordan Kerr | AUS | John-Patrick Smith | 212 | 4 |

- ^{1} Rankings as of April 8, 2013.

=== Other entrants ===
The following pairs received wildcards into the doubles main draw:

- (Mexico) Miguel Gallardo Valles / (Mexico) Miguel Ángel Reyes-Varela
- (France) Gianni Mina / (Mexico) Santiago Sierra
- (Mexico) Alejandro Moreno Figueroa / (Mexico) Manuel Sánchez

== Champions ==
=== Singles ===
- (Slovakia) Andrej Martin def. (France) Adrian Mannarino, 4–6, 6–4, 6–1

=== Doubles ===
- (Australia) Carsten Ball / (Australia) Chris Guccione def. (Australia) Jordan Kerr / (Australia) John-Patrick Smith, 6–3, 3–6, [11–9]
