= 2021 Hall of Fame Open – Singles =

Tennis tournament

Singles
- 2021 Hall of Fame Open

Final
- Champion: (South Africa) Kevin Anderson
- Runner-up: (United States) Jenson Brooksby
- Score: 7–6^{(10–8)}, 6–4

Details
- Draw: 28 (4 Q / 3 WC )
- Seeds: 8

Events
Singles	Doubles
← 2019 ·	Hall of Fame Open	· 2022 →

Kevin Anderson defeated Jenson Brooksby in the final, 7–6^{(10–8)}, 6–4, to win the singles tennis title at the 2021 Hall of Fame Open. It was played on outdoor grass courts and was part of the 250 series of the 2021 ATP Tour. It took place at the International Tennis Hall of Fame in Newport, Rhode Island, United States from 12 to 18 July 2021.

John Isner was the reigning champion from when the tournament was last held in 2019, but chose not to defend his title.

== Seeds ==
The top four seeds receive a bye into the second round.

1. (Kazakhstan) Alexander Bublik (semifinals)
2. (United States) Sam Querrey (second round)
3. (Japan) Yoshihito Nishioka (second round)
4. (Canada) Vasek Pospisil (second round)
5. (United States) Tennys Sandgren (second round)
6. (United States) Steve Johnson (first round)
7. (Australia) Jordan Thompson (semifinals)
8. (South Africa) Kevin Anderson (champion)

== Draw ==
=== Key ===
- Q = Qualifier
- WC = Wild card
- LL = Lucky loser
- Alt = Alternate
- ITF = ITF entry
- PR = Protected ranking
- SR = Special ranking
- SE = Special exempt
- JE = Junior exempt
- JR = Junior Accelerator Programme entrant
- CO = College Accelerator Programme entrant
- NG = Next Gen Accelerator Program entrant
- w/o = Walkover
- r = Retired
- d = Defaulted

=== Finals ===
Semifinals
1	(Kazakhstan) Alexander Bublik	6	6^{3}	5
8/WC	(South Africa) Kevin Anderson	4	7^{7}	7
(United States) Jenson Brooksby	6	7^{7}
7	(Australia) Jordan Thompson	3	6^{3}

Final
8/WC	(South Africa) Kevin Anderson	7^{10}	6
(United States) Jenson Brooksby	6^{8}	4

=== Top half ===
First round
WC	(Croatia) I Karlović	6^{5}	6	6
(Spain) B Zapata Miralles	7^{7}	1	4
Q	(Canada) B Schnur	5	7^{7}	6^{4}
(Chinese Taipei) J Jung	7	6^{1}	7^{7}
(Portugal) J Sousa	4	6^{3}
5	(United States) T Sandgren	6	7^{7}
WC	(United States) J Sock	3	6	6
Q	(Australia) A Bolt	6	4	3
(Japan) Y Uchiyama	4	4
Q	(Austria) S Ofner	6	6
(Ukraine) I Marchenko	5	3
8/WC	(South Africa) K Anderson	7	6

Second round
1	(Kazakhstan) A Bublik	7^{7}	4	6
WC	(Croatia) I Karlović	6^{5}	6	1
(Chinese Taipei) J Jung	6	6
5	(United States) T Sandgren	2	2
3	(Japan) Y Nishioka	2	3
WC	(United States) J Sock	6	6
Q	(Austria) S Ofner	5	6^{3}
8/WC	(South Africa) K Anderson	7	7^{7}

Quarterfinals
1	(Kazakhstan) A Bublik	6	6
(Chinese Taipei) J Jung	2	4
WC	(United States) J Sock	7^{7}	2	4
8/WC	(South Africa) K Anderson	6^{5}	6	6

Semifinals
1	(Kazakhstan) A Bublik	6	6^{3}	5
8/WC	(South Africa) K Anderson	4	7^{7}	7

=== Bottom half ===
First round
6	(United States) S Johnson	6^{3}	6	4
(United States) D Kudla	7^{7}	3	6
(United States) J Brooksby	7	6
(Russia) E Donskoy	5	3
(Germany) P Gojowczyk	6	6
Q	(United States) M Krueger	2	2
7	(Australia) J Thompson	5
(Germany) C-M Stebe	4^{r}
(Japan) Y Sugita	7	6
(Austria) J Rodionov	5	3
(United States) M Cressy	6	6
(Italy) P Lorenzi	1	2

Second round
(United States) D Kudla	3	6	5
(United States) J Brooksby	6	4	7
(Germany) P Gojowczyk	6	6
4	(Canada) V Pospisil	3	3
7	(Australia) J Thompson	6	6
(Japan) Y Sugita	0	2
(United States) M Cressy	6	2	6
2	(United States) S Querrey	4	6	2

Quarterfinals
(United States) J Brooksby	6	6
(Germany) P Gojowczyk	0	3
7	(Australia) J Thompson	6	7^{8}
(United States) M Cressy	3	6^{6}

Semifinals
(United States) J Brooksby	6	7^{7}
7	(Australia) J Thompson	3	6^{3}

== Qualifying ==
=== Seeds ===
1. (Australia) Alex Bolt (qualified)
2. (Austria) Sebastian Ofner (qualified)
3. (Slovakia) Lukáš Lacko (first round)
4. (United States) Mitchell Krueger (qualified)
5. (United States) Christopher Eubanks (first round)
6. (India) Ramkumar Ramanathan (qualifying competition)
7. (Belgium) Ruben Bemelmans (qualifying competition)
8. (United States) Thai-Son Kwiatkowski (first round)

=== Qualifiers ===
1. (Australia) Alex Bolt
2. (Austria) Sebastian Ofner
3. (Canada) Brayden Schnur
4. (United States) Mitchell Krueger

=== Qualifying draw ===
==== First qualifier ====
First round
1	(Australia) Alex Bolt	7^{7}	7^{7}
WC	(United States) William Blumberg	6^{5}	6^{1}
WC	(United States) Ryan Harrison	7^{7}	6^{16}	7^{10}
5	(United States) Christopher Eubanks	6^{4}	7^{18}	6^{8}

Qualifying competition
1	(Australia) Alex Bolt	6	6^{2}	7
WC	(United States) Ryan Harrison	0	7^{7}	5

==== Second qualifier ====
First round
2	(Austria) Sebastian Ofner	4	6	6
(Ecuador) Roberto Quiroz	6	3	1
(India) Sasikumar Mukund	5	4
7	(Belgium) Ruben Bemelmans	7	6

Qualifying competition
2	(Austria) Sebastian Ofner	6	3	6
7	(Belgium) Ruben Bemelmans	4	6	3

==== Third qualifier ====
First round
3	(Slovakia) Lukáš Lacko	0	4
(Canada) Brayden Schnur	6	6
(United States) Ulises Blanch	2	6	7^{7}
8	(United States) Thai-Son Kwiatkowski	6	2	6^{5}

Qualifying competition
(Canada) Brayden Schnur	6	7^{8}
(United States) Ulises Blanch	2	6^{6}

==== Fourth qualifier ====
First round
4	(United States) Mitchell Krueger	7	6
(United States) Noah Rubin	5	4
(Barbados) Darian King	3	4
6	(India) Ramkumar Ramanathan	6	6

Qualifying competition
4	(United States) Mitchell Krueger	6	5	6
6	(India) Ramkumar Ramanathan	4	7	4
