= 2021 Hall of Fame Open =

- Date: July 12–18
- Edition: 45th
- Category: ATP Tour 250 series
- Surface: Grass / outdoor
- Location: Newport, Rhode Island, United States
- Venue: International Tennis Hall of Fame

Champions

Singles
- (South Africa) Kevin Anderson

Doubles
- (United States) William Blumberg / (United States) Jack Sock
← 2019 ·	Hall of Fame Open	· 2022 →

The 2021 Hall of Fame Open was a men's tennis tournament played on outdoor grass courts. It was the 45th edition of the event, and part of the 250 series of the 2021 ATP Tour. It took place at the International Tennis Hall of Fame in Newport, Rhode Island, United States, from July 12 through July 18, 2021.

== Champions ==
=== Singles ===
- (South Africa) Kevin Anderson def. (United States) Jenson Brooksby, 7–6^{(10–8)}, 6–4

=== Doubles ===
- (United States) William Blumberg / (United States) Jack Sock def. (United States) Austin Krajicek / (Canada) Vasek Pospisil, 6–2, 7–6^{(7–3)}

== Points and prize money ==
=== Point distribution ===
Event	W	F	SF	QF	Round of 16	Round of 32	Q	Q2	Q1
Singles	250	150	90	45	20	0	12	6	0
Doubles	250	150	90	45	0	—	—	—	—

=== Prize money ===
Event	W	F	SF	QF	Round of 16	Round of 32	Q2	Q1
Singles	$45,795	$32,835	$23,375	$15,580	$10,015	$6,030	$2,945	$1,530
Doubles*	$17,100	$12,240	$8,070	$5,240	$3,070	—	—	—

_{*per team}

== Singles main draw entrants ==
=== Seeds ===
Country	Player	Rank^{1}	Seed
KAZ	Alexander Bublik	38	1
USA	Sam Querrey	54	2
JPN	Yoshihito Nishioka	58	3
CAN	Vasek Pospisil	65	4
USA	Tennys Sandgren	68	5
USA	Steve Johnson	74	6
AUS	Jordan Thompson	78	7
RSA	Kevin Anderson	102	8

- ^{1} Rankings are as of June 28, 2021.

=== Other entrants ===
The following players received wildcards into the main draw:

- (South Africa) Kevin Anderson
- (Croatia) Ivo Karlović
- (United States) Jack Sock

The following players received entry from the qualifying draw:

- (Australia) Alex Bolt
- (United States) Mitchell Krueger
- (Austria) Sebastian Ofner
- (Canada) Brayden Schnur

=== Withdrawals ===
Before the tournament

- (Australia) James Duckworth → replaced by (United States) Jenson Brooksby
- (United States) Marcos Giron → replaced by (Chinese Taipei) Jason Jung
- (France) Adrian Mannarino → replaced by (United States) Maxime Cressy
- (United States) Mackenzie McDonald → replaced by (Germany) Cedrik-Marcel Stebe
- (United States) Tommy Paul → replaced by (Austria) Jurij Rodionov
- (Italy) Andreas Seppi → replaced by (Italy) Paolo Lorenzi

== Doubles main draw entrants ==
=== Seeds ===
Country	Player	Country	Player	Rank^{1}	Seed
NZL	Marcus Daniell	JPN	Ben McLachlan	88	1
ISR	Jonathan Erlich	MEX	Santiago González	126	2
FIN	Harri Heliövaara	AUS	John-Patrick Smith	156	3
~~GBR~~	~~Luke Bambridge~~	~~AUS~~	~~Matt Reid~~	~~157~~	~~4~~

- ^{1} Rankings are as of June 28, 2021.

=== Other entrants ===
The following pairs received wildcards into the doubles main draw:

- (United States) William Blumberg / (United States) Jack Sock
- (Kazakhstan) Alexander Bublik / (United States) Dennis Novikov

The following pair received entry as alternates:

- (Japan) Yoshihito Nishioka / (Japan) Yasutaka Uchiyama

=== Withdrawals ===
Before the tournament

- (Australia) Matthew Ebden / (Australia) John-Patrick Smith → replaced by (Finland) Harri Heliövaara / (Australia) John-Patrick Smith
- (Finland) Harri Heliövaara / (United Kingdom) Lloyd Glasspool → replaced by (United States) Robert Galloway / (United States) Alex Lawson
- (Australia) James Duckworth / (Australia) Matt Reid → (Japan) Yoshihito Nishioka / (Japan) Yasutaka Uchiyama
- (United States) Marcos Giron / (United States) Evan King → replaced by (Philippines) Treat Huey / (Mexico) Miguel Ángel Reyes Varela

During the tournament

- (Kazakhstan) Alexander Bublik / (United States) Dennis Novikov
- (Portugal) João Sousa / (Australia) Jordan Thompson
