= 2013 Copa Internacional de Tenis Total Digest – Singles =

Singles
- 2013 Copa Internacional de Tenis Total Digest

Final
- Champion: (Slovakia) Andrej Martin
- Runner-up: (France) Adrian Mannarino
- Score: 4–6, 6–4, 6–1

Events
Singles	Doubles
Copa Internacional de Tenis Total Digest

Andrej Martin won the first edition of the event by defeating Adrian Mannarino 4–6, 6–4, 6–1 in the final.

== Seeds ==
1. (Chinese Taipei) Lu Yen-hsun (first round, retired)
2. (Israel) Dudi Sela (semifinals)
3. (United States) Rajeev Ram (first round)
4. (France) Adrian Mannarino (final)
5. (Japan) Yūichi Sugita (second round)
6. (Canada) Vasek Pospisil (second round)
7. (United States) Donald Young (first round)
8. (Chinese Taipei) Jimmy Wang (second round, retired)

== Draw ==
=== Key ===
- Q = Qualifier
- WC = Wild card
- LL = Lucky loser
- Alt = Alternate
- SE = Special exempt
- PR = Protected ranking
- ITF = ITF entry
- JE = Junior exempt
- w/o = Walkover
- r = Retired
- d = Defaulted
- SR = Special ranking

=== Finals ===
Semifinals
(Poland) Michał Przysiężny	2	2
(Slovakia) Andrej Martin	6	6
4	(France) Adrian Mannarino	7	6
2	(Israel) Dudi Sela	5	2

Final
(Slovakia) Andrej Martin	4	6	6
4	(France) Adrian Mannarino	6	4	1

=== Top half ===
First round
1	(Chinese Taipei) Y-h Lu	3	0^{r}
Q	(Australia) C Guccione	6	0
Q	(Croatia) F Škugor	6	6
WC	(Mexico) Eduardo Peralta-Tello	1	2
(Poland) M Przysiężny	6	6
(Israel) A Weintraub	3	2
(Czech Republic) J Hernych	3	4
5	(Japan) Y Sugita	6	6
3	(United States) R Ram	0	3
Alt	(Switzerland) M Lammer	6	6
(Slovakia) A Martin	6	6
Alt	(Slovakia) N Gombos	3	4
(France) G Burquier	7^{7}	6
(United States) A El Mihdawy	6^{2}	2
WC	(Mexico) M Gallardo-Valles	7^{7}	2	3
8	(Chinese Taipei) J Wang	6^{4}	6	6

Second round
Q	(Australia) C Guccione	4	6^{3}
Q	(Croatia) F Škugor	6	7^{7}
(Poland) M Przysiężny	3	6	7
5	(Japan) Y Sugita	6	3	5
Alt	(Switzerland) M Lammer	3	3
(Slovakia) A Martin	6	6
(France) G Burquier	6	3
8	(Chinese Taipei) J Wang	0	0^{r}

Quarterfinals
Q	(Croatia) F Škugor	6^{1}	1^{r}
(Poland) M Przysiężny	7^{7}	2
(Slovakia) A Martin	6	6
(France) G Burquier	3	0

Semifinals
(Poland) M Przysiężny	2	2
(Slovakia) A Martin	6	6

=== Bottom half ===
First round
6	(Canada) V Pospisil	5	7^{10}	7^{7}
WC	(France) Antoine Benneteau	7	6^{8}	6^{3}
(Germany) P Gojowczyk	4	6^{6}
WC	(Mexico) MÁ Reyes-Varela	6	7^{8}
Q	(Guatemala) C Díaz Figueroa	7^{7}	6
(Australia) G Jones	6^{3}	3
(Brazil) M Demoliner	6	6^{2}	0
4	(France) A Mannarino	1	7^{7}	6
7	(United States) D Young	2	6	4
(Germany) N Langer	6	4	6
(Germany) P Torebko	3	6	3
(United States) D Zivkovic	6	3	6
Q	(France) G Mina	4	6^{5}
(Australia) M Barton	6	7^{7}
(Australia) J-P Smith	5	4
2	(Israel) D Sela	7	6

Second round
6	(Canada) V Pospisil	6^{5}	6^{2}
WC	(Mexico) MÁ Reyes-Varela	7^{7}	7^{7}
Q	(Guatemala) C Díaz Figueroa	2	6	4
4	(France) A Mannarino	6	3	6
(Germany) N Langer	7^{7}	6
(United States) D Zivkovic	6^{5}	3
(Australia) M Barton	3	5
2	(Israel) D Sela	6	7

Quarterfinals
WC	(Mexico) MÁ Reyes-Varela	4	3
4	(France) A Mannarino	6	6
(Germany) N Langer	6	6^{3}	2
2	(Israel) D Sela	2	7^{7}	6

Semifinals
4	(France) A Mannarino	7	6
2	(Israel) D Sela	5	2
