= 2022 Hall of Fame Open =

- Date: July 10–17
- Edition: 46th
- Category: ATP Tour 250 series
- Surface: Grass / outdoor
- Location: Newport, Rhode Island, United States
- Venue: International Tennis Hall of Fame

Champions

Singles
- (United States) Maxime Cressy

Doubles
- (United States) William Blumberg / (United States) Steve Johnson
← 2021 ·	Hall of Fame Open	· 2023 →

The 2022 Hall of Fame Open was a men's tennis tournament played on outdoor grass courts. It was the 46th edition of the event, and part of the 250 series of the 2022 ATP Tour. It took place at the International Tennis Hall of Fame in Newport, Rhode Island, United States, from July 10 through July 17, 2022.

== Champions ==
=== Singles ===
- (United States) Maxime Cressy def. (Kazakhstan) Alexander Bublik, 2–6, 6–3, 7–6^{(7–3)}

=== Doubles ===
- (United States) William Blumberg / (United States) Steve Johnson def. (South Africa) Raven Klaasen / (Brazil) Marcelo Melo, 6–4, 7–5

== Points and prize money ==
=== Point distribution ===
Event	W	F	SF	QF	Round of 16	Round of 32	Q	Q2	Q1
Singles	250	150	90	45	20	0	12	6	0
Doubles	250	150	90	45	0	—	—	—	—

=== Prize money ===
Event	W	F	SF	QF	Round of 16	Round of 32	Q2	Q1
Singles	$90,495	$52,790	$31,035	$17,985	$10,440	$6,380	$3,190	$1,740
Doubles*	$31,440	$16,820	$9,860	$5,510	$3,250	—	—	—

_{*per team}

== Singles main draw entrants ==
=== Seeds ===
Country	Player	Rank^{1}	Seed
CAN	Félix Auger-Aliassime	9	1
USA	John Isner	24	2
KAZ	Alexander Bublik	38	3
USA	Maxime Cressy	45	4
FRA	Benjamin Bonzi	47	5
GBR	Andy Murray	52	6
CZE	Jiří Veselý	68	7
AUS	James Duckworth	74	8

- ^{1} Rankings are as of June 27, 2022.

=== Other entrants ===
The following players received wildcards into the main draw:

- (Canada) Félix Auger-Aliassime
- (United Kingdom) Andy Murray
- (Australia) Max Purcell

The following players received entry from the qualifying draw:

- (United States) William Blumberg
- (United Kingdom) Liam Broady
- (United States) Christopher Eubanks
- (United States) Mitchell Krueger

=== Withdrawals ===
Before the tournament

- (United States) Jenson Brooksby → replaced by (United States) Stefan Kozlov
- (United Kingdom) Jack Draper → replaced by (Netherlands) Tim van Rijthoven
- Ilya Ivashka → replaced by (Spain) Feliciano López
- (United States) Denis Kudla → replaced by (United States) Jack Sock

== Doubles main draw entrants ==
=== Seeds ===
Country	Player	Country	Player	Rank^{1}	Seed
RSA	Raven Klaasen	BRA	Marcelo Melo	92	1
MEX	Hans Hach Verdugo	USA	Hunter Reese	135	2
USA	Nathaniel Lammons	USA	Jackson Withrow	163	3
USA	William Blumberg	USA	Steve Johnson	165	4

- ^{1} Rankings are as of June 27, 2022.

=== Other entrants ===
The following pairs received wildcards into the doubles main draw:

- (Canada) Félix Auger-Aliassime / (France) Benjamin Bonzi
- (United States) Richard Ciamarra / (United States) Sam Querrey

=== Withdrawals ===
Before the tournament

- (United States) Maxime Cressy / (Switzerland) Marc-Andrea Hüsler → replaced by (United States) Max Schnur / (New Zealand) Artem Sitak
- (Australia) Matthew Ebden / (Australia) Max Purcell → replaced by (Australia) Max Purcell / (Netherlands) Tim van Rijthoven
- (United States) William Blumberg / (United States) Jack Sock → replaced by (United States) William Blumberg / (United States) Steve Johnson
- (Philippines) Treat Huey / (United States) Denis Kudla → replaced by (Moldova) Radu Albot / (Philippines) Treat Huey
- (France) Sadio Doumbia / (France) Fabien Reboul → replaced by (United States) Nicholas Monroe / (France) Fabien Reboul
