= 2023 Hall of Fame Open – Doubles =

Doubles
- 2023 Hall of Fame Open

Final
- Champions: (United States) Nathaniel Lammons (United States) Jackson Withrow
- Runners-up: (United States) William Blumberg (Australia) Max Purcell
- Score: 6–3, 5–7, [10–5]

Events
Singles	Doubles
← 2022 ·	Hall of Fame Open	· 2024 →

Nathaniel Lammons and Jackson Withrow defeated the two-time defending champion William Blumberg and his partner Max Purcell in the final, 6–3, 5–7, [10–5] to win the doubles tennis title at the 2023 Hall of Fame Open.

Blumberg and Steve Johnson were the reigning champions, but Johnson chose not to participate this year. Blumberg was attempting to win his third consecutive title at Newport alongside three different partners.

== Seeds ==
1. (United States) Nathaniel Lammons / (United States) Jackson Withrow (champions)
2. (Australia) Rinky Hijikata / (United States) Reese Stalder (first round)
3. (India) Yuki Bhambri / (India) Saketh Myneni (semifinals)
4. (United Kingdom) Julian Cash / (United States) Maxime Cressy (first round)

== Draw ==
=== Key ===
- Q = Qualifier
- WC = Wild card
- LL = Lucky loser
- Alt = Alternate
- SE = Special exempt
- PR = Protected ranking
- ITF = ITF entry
- JE = Junior exempt
- w/o = Walkover
- r = Retired
- d = Defaulted
- SR = Special ranking

=== Draw ===
First round
1	(United States) N Lammons (United States) J Withrow	6	5	[10]
(Mexico) H Hach Verdugo (Mexico) MÁ Reyes-Varela	4	7	[8]
(Sweden) A Göransson (Japan) B McLachlan	7^{8}	6^{4}	[10]
(Australia) A Harris (United States) E King	6^{6}	7^{7}	[5]
3	(India) Y Bhambri (India) S Myneni	3	6	[10]
WC	(United States) T Paul (United States) E Spizzirri	6	1	[8]
(United States) R Galloway (Australia) J-P Smith	7	6
WC	(South Africa) K Anderson (United States) E Quinn	5	4
(France) A Mannarino (Australia) J Thompson	6	6
(France) T Arribagé (France) L Sanchez	2	4
(India) A Chandrasekar (India) VS Prashanth	6	6
4	(United Kingdom) J Cash (United States) M Cressy	4	3
(United States) W Blumberg (Australia) M Purcell	6	7
(France) C Lestienne (Australia) A Vukic	4	5
(South Korea) Y-s Chung (United States) A Kovacevic	7^{9}	6
2	(Australia) R Hijikata (United States) R Stalder	6^{7}	3

Quarterfinals
1	(United States) N Lammons (United States) J Withrow	7	4	[13]
(Sweden) A Göransson (Japan) B McLachlan	5	6	[11]
3	(India) Y Bhambri (India) S Myneni	2	7^{7}	[10]
(United States) R Galloway (Australia) J-P Smith	6	6^{5}	[5]
(France) A Mannarino (Australia) J Thompson	7^{10}	4	[11]
(India) A Chandrasekar (India) VS Prashanth	6^{8}	6	[13]
(United States) W Blumberg (Australia) M Purcell	6	6
(South Korea) Y-s Chung (United States) A Kovacevic	4	2

Semifinals
1	(United States) N Lammons (United States) J Withrow	6^{2}	7^{7}	[11]
3	(India) Y Bhambri (India) S Myneni	7^{7}	6^{1}	[9]
(India) A Chandrasekar (India) VS Prashanth	4	6^{5}
(United States) W Blumberg (Australia) M Purcell	6	7^{7}

Final
1	(United States) N Lammons (United States) J Withrow	6	5	[10]
(United States) W Blumberg (Australia) M Purcell	3	7	[5]
