= 2019 Hall of Fame Open =

- Date: July 15 – July 21
- Edition: 44th
- Category: ATP Tour 250 series
- Surface: Grass / Outdoor
- Location: Newport, Rhode Island, United States
- Venue: International Tennis Hall of Fame

Champions

Singles
- (United States) John Isner

Doubles
- (Spain) Marcel Granollers / (Ukraine) Sergiy Stakhovsky
← 2018 ·	Hall of Fame Open	· 2021 →

The 2019 Hall of Fame Open was a men's tennis tournament played on outdoor grass courts. It was the 44th edition of the event, and part of the 250 series of the 2019 ATP Tour. It took place at the International Tennis Hall of Fame in Newport, Rhode Island, United States, from July 15 through July 21, 2019.

== Singles main draw entrants ==
=== Seeds ===
Country	Player	Rank^{1}	Seed
USA	John Isner	12	1
FRA	Adrian Mannarino	42	2
AUS	Jordan Thompson	44	3
FRA	Ugo Humbert	66	4
USA	Steve Johnson	71	5
CRO	Ivo Karlović	80	6
KAZ	Alexander Bublik	82	7
USA	Bradley Klahn	87	8

- ^{1} Rankings are as of July 1, 2019

=== Other entrants ===
The following players received wildcards into the singles main draw:

- (United States) Christopher Eubanks
- (United Kingdom) Alastair Gray
- (United States) John Isner

The following players received entry from the qualifying draw:

- (Australia) Alex Bolt
- (India) Ramkumar Ramanathan
- (United States) Tim Smyczek
- (Serbia) Viktor Troicki

== ATP doubles main draw entrants ==
=== Seeds ===
Country	Player	Country	Player	Rank^{1}	Seed
MEX	Santiago González	PAK	Aisam-ul-Haq Qureshi	109	1
ISR	Jonathan Erlich	NZL	Artem Sitak	120	2
NZL	Marcus Daniell	IND	Leander Paes	122	3
JPN	Ben McLachlan	AUS	John-Patrick Smith	130	4

- Rankings are as of July 1, 2019

=== Other entrants ===
The following pairs received wildcards into the doubles main draw:

- (United States) Maxime Cressy / (United States) Keegan Smith
- (United States) Tennys Sandgren / (United States) Max Schnur

== Champions ==
=== Singles ===
- (United States) John Isner def. (Kazakhstan) Alexander Bublik, 7–6^{(7–2)}, 6–3

=== Doubles ===
- (Spain) Marcel Granollers / (Ukraine) Sergiy Stakhovsky def. (El Salvador) Marcelo Arévalo / (Mexico) Miguel Ángel Reyes-Varela, 6–7^{(10–12)}, 6–4, [13–11]
