= 2019 Hall of Fame Open – Doubles =

Doubles
- 2019 Hall of Fame Open

Final
- Champions: (Spain) Marcel Granollers (Ukraine) Sergiy Stakhovsky
- Runners-up: (El Salvador) Marcelo Arévalo (Mexico) Miguel Ángel Reyes-Varela
- Score: 6–7^{(10–12)}, 6–4, [13–11]

Events
Singles	Doubles
← 2018 ·	Hall of Fame Open	· 2021 →

Jonathan Erlich and Artem Sitak were the defending champions, but lost in the first round to Marcel Granollers and Sergiy Stakhovsky.

Granollers and Stakhovsky went on to win the title, defeating Marcelo Arévalo and Miguel Ángel Reyes-Varela in the final, 6–7^{(10–12)}, 6–4, [13–11].

== Seeds ==
1. (Mexico) Santiago González / (Pakistan) Aisam-ul-Haq Qureshi (first round)
2. (Israel) Jonathan Erlich / (New Zealand) Artem Sitak (first round)
3. (New Zealand) Marcus Daniell / (India) Leander Paes (semifinals)
4. (Japan) Ben McLachlan / (Australia) John-Patrick Smith (semifinals)

== Draw ==
=== Key ===
- Q = Qualifier
- WC = Wild card
- LL = Lucky loser
- Alt = Alternate
- SE = Special exempt
- PR = Protected ranking
- ITF = ITF entry
- JE = Junior exempt
- w/o = Walkover
- r = Retired
- d = Defaulted
- SR = Special ranking

=== Draw ===
First round
1	(Mexico) S González (Pakistan) A-u-H Qureshi	6	6^{4}	[12]
(United States) B Klahn (United States) D Kudla	3	7^{7}	[14]
(El Salvador) M Arévalo (Mexico) MÁ Reyes-Varela	6	6
WC	(United States) T Sandgren (United States) M Schnur	3	4
4	(Japan) B McLachlan (Australia) J-P Smith	6	7^{9}
(France) U Humbert (Monaco) H Nys	3	6^{7}
(United States) N Monroe (Germany) M Zverev	7^{7}	6^{4}	[10]
WC	(United States) M Cressy (United States) K Smith	6^{5}	7^{7}	[7]
(Australia) M Ebden (Sweden) R Lindstedt	7	6
(Kazakhstan) A Bublik (Uzbekistan) D Istomin	5	2
(Australia) M Purcell (Australia) L Saville	6	2	[5]
3	(New Zealand) M Daniell (India) L Paes	2	6	[10]
(India) J Nedunchezhiyan (India) P Raja	6^{3}	6^{10}
(China) M Gong (China) Z Zhang	7^{7}	7^{12}
(Spain) M Granollers (Ukraine) S Stakhovsky	6^{6}	6	[11]
2	(Israel) J Erlich (New Zealand) A Sitak	7^{8}	3	[9]

Quarterfinals
(United States) B Klahn (United States) D Kudla	3	3
(El Salvador) M Arévalo (Mexico) MÁ Reyes-Varela	6	6
4	(Japan) B McLachlan (Australia) J-P Smith	6	6
(United States) N Monroe (Germany) M Zverev	3	4
(Australia) M Ebden (Sweden) R Lindstedt	4	7	[12]
3	(New Zealand) M Daniell (India) L Paes	6	5	[14]
(China) M Gong (China) Z Zhang	2	3
(Spain) M Granollers (Ukraine) S Stakhovsky	6	6

Semifinals
(El Salvador) M Arévalo (Mexico) MÁ Reyes-Varela	7	4	[10]
4	(Japan) B McLachlan (Australia) J-P Smith	5	6	[4]
3	(New Zealand) M Daniell (India) L Paes	6	6^{8}	[9]
(Spain) M Granollers (Ukraine) S Stakhovsky	3	7^{10}	[11]

Final
(El Salvador) M Arévalo (Mexico) MÁ Reyes-Varela	7^{12}	4	[11]
(Spain) M Granollers (Ukraine) S Stakhovsky	6^{10}	6	[13]
