= 2011 Western & Southern Open – Men's singles qualifying =

This article shows the Qualifying Draw for the 2011 Western & Southern Open.

== Players ==
=== Seeds ===
1. (Czech Republic) Radek Štěpánek (qualified)
2. (Spain) Pablo Andújar (first round)
3. (Japan) Kei Nishikori (qualified)
4. (Finland) Jarkko Nieminen (first round)
5. (France) Adrian Mannarino (qualifying competition)
6. (Latvia) Ernests Gulbis (qualified)
7. (United States) Alex Bogomolov, Jr. (qualified)
8. (Kazakhstan) Mikhail Kukushkin (qualifying competition)
9. (France) Jérémy Chardy (first round)
10. (India) Somdev Devvarman (first round)
11. (Australia) Bernard Tomic (first round)
12. (United States) Ryan Sweeting (first round)
13. (Austria) Andreas Haider-Maurer (first round)
14. (Belgium) Olivier Rochus (first round)

== Qualifiers ==
1. (Czech Republic) Radek Štěpánek
2. (France) Édouard Roger-Vasselin
3. (Japan) Kei Nishikori
4. (Turkey) Marsel İlhan
5. (France) Julien Benneteau
6. (Latvia) Ernests Gulbis
7. (United States) Alex Bogomolov, Jr.

== Qualifying draw ==
=== First qualifier ===
First round
1	(Czech Republic) Radek Štěpánek	7^{7}	6
WC	(United States) Rhyne Williams	6^{3}	1
(South Africa) Rik de Voest	6	6
13	(Austria) Andreas Haider-Maurer	3	2

Qualifying competition
1	(Czech Republic) Radek Štěpánek	7	6
(South Africa) Rik de Voest	5	0

=== Second qualifier ===
First round
2	(Spain) Pablo Andújar	3	7	0
(France) Édouard Roger-Vasselin	6	5	6
WC	(United States) Steve Johnson	7^{11}	6
9	(France) Jérémy Chardy	6^{9}	4

Qualifying competition
(France) Édouard Roger-Vasselin	6	6
WC	(United States) Steve Johnson	2	1

=== Third qualifier ===
First round
3	(Japan) Kei Nishikori	6	6
(Brazil) João Souza	1	4
WC	(United States) Tim Smyczek	4	2
8	(Kazakhstan) Mikhail Kukushkin	6	6

Qualifying competition
3	(Japan) Kei Nishikori	6	6
8	(Kazakhstan) Mikhail Kukushkin	3	4

=== Fourth qualifier ===
First round
4	(Finland) Jarkko Nieminen	4	6	5
Alt	(Netherlands) Thomas Schoorel	6	4	7
(Turkey) Marsel İlhan	6	7^{7}
10	(India) Somdev Devvarman	4	6^{3}

Qualifying competition
Alt	(Netherlands) Thomas Schoorel	6^{4}	3
(Turkey) Marsel İlhan	7^{7}	6

=== Fifth qualifier ===
First round
5	(France) Adrian Mannarino	6	4	6
(Brazil) Rogério Dutra da Silva	4	6	4
Alt	(France) Julien Benneteau	7^{7}	6^{3}	6
11	(Australia) Bernard Tomic	6^{4}	7^{7}	1

Qualifying competition
5	(France) Adrian Mannarino	2	5
Alt	(France) Julien Benneteau	6	7

=== Sixth qualifier ===
First round
6	(Latvia) Ernests Gulbis	3	6	6
(Colombia) Alejandro Falla	6	1	2
(Russia) Igor Andreev	6	6
14	(Belgium) Olivier Rochus	4	4

Qualifying competition
6	(Latvia) Ernests Gulbis	6	4	6
(Russia) Igor Andreev	2	6	3

=== Seventh qualifier ===
First round
7	(United States) Alex Bogomolov, Jr.	6	6
WC	(United States) Donald Young	0	4
(Italy) Flavio Cipolla	0	6	6
12	(United States) Ryan Sweeting	6	2	2

Qualifying competition
7	(United States) Alex Bogomolov, Jr.	6	6
(Italy) Flavio Cipolla	3	0
