= 2017 Rakuten Japan Open Tennis Championships – Singles =

Singles
- 2017 Rakuten Japan Open Tennis Championships

Final
- Champion: (Belgium) David Goffin
- Runner-up: (France) Adrian Mannarino
- Score: 6–3, 7–5

Details
- Draw: 32 (4Q / 3WC)
- Seeds: 8

Events
Singles	Doubles
← 2016 ·	Japan Open	· 2018 →

Nick Kyrgios was the defending champion, but chose to compete in Beijing instead.

David Goffin won the title, defeating Adrian Mannarino in the final, 6–3, 7–5.

== Seeds ==
1. (Croatia) Marin Čilić (semifinals)
2. (Austria) Dominic Thiem (first round)
3. (Canada) Milos Raonic (second round, retired)
4. (Belgium) David Goffin (champion)
5. (South Africa) Kevin Anderson (second round)
6. (United States) Sam Querrey (first round)
7. (Spain) Albert Ramos Viñolas (first round)
8. (Argentina) Diego Schwartzman (semifinals)

== Draw ==
=== Key ===
- Q = Qualifier
- WC = Wild card
- LL = Lucky loser
- Alt = Alternate
- SE = Special exempt
- PR = Protected ranking
- ITF = ITF entry
- JE = Junior exempt
- w/o = Walkover
- r = Retired
- d = Defaulted
- SR = Special ranking

=== Finals ===
Semifinals
1	(Croatia) Marin Čilić	7^{7}	4	0
(France) Adrian Mannarino	6^{5}	6	6
4	(Belgium) David Goffin	7^{7}	7^{8}
8	(Argentina) Diego Schwartzman	6^{3}	6^{6}

Final
(France) Adrian Mannarino	3	5
4	(Belgium) David Goffin	6	7

=== Top half ===
First round
1	(Croatia) M Čilić	6	6
Q	(Greece) S Tsitsipas	3	2
WC	(Japan) Y Uchiyama	6	3	6
Q	(Croatia) F Škugor	3	6	1
Q	(Japan) Y Takahashi	4	6	4
(United States) R Harrison	6	4	6
(France) G Simon	2	6^{6}
5	(South Africa) K Anderson	6	7^{8}
3	(Canada) M Raonic	6	6
(Serbia) V Troicki	3	4
(France) B Paire	4	0^{r}
(Japan) Y Sugita	6	0
WC	(Japan) G Soeda	5	6^{3}
(France) A Mannarino	7	7^{7}
(Czech Republic) J Veselý	6	2	6
7	(Spain) A Ramos Viñolas	2	6	3

Second round
1	(Croatia) M Čilić	6	6
WC	(Japan) Y Uchiyama	3	4
(United States) R Harrison	6	1	7^{7}
5	(South Africa) K Anderson	3	6	6^{2}
3	(Canada) M Raonic	0^{r}
(Japan) Y Sugita	1
(France) A Mannarino	6	6
(Czech Republic) J Veselý	3	2

Quarterfinals
1	(Croatia) M Čilić	6	6
(United States) R Harrison	2	0
(Japan) Y Sugita	2	4
(France) A Mannarino	6	6

Semifinals
1	(Croatia) M Čilić	7^{7}	4	0
(France) A Mannarino	6^{5}	6	6

=== Bottom half ===
First round
6	(United States) S Querrey	4	6^{2}
(France) R Gasquet	6	7^{7}
WC	(Japan) T Daniel	1	3
(Chinese Taipei) Y-h Lu	6	6
(Croatia) I Karlović	4	3
Q	(Australia) M Ebden	6	6
(Spain) F Lopez	5	1
4	(Belgium) D Goffin	7	6
8	(Argentina) D Schwartzman	6	7
(United States) D Young	2	5
(Australia) B Tomic	6	3	6
(Portugal) J Sousa	3	6	3
SE	(Ukraine) A Dolgopolov	6	6
(Russia) D Medvedev	1	2
(United States) S Johnson	4	7^{7}	6
2	(Austria) D Thiem	6	6^{5}	4

Second round
(France) R Gasquet	6	7^{7}
(Chinese Taipei) Y-h Lu	0	6^{5}
Q	(Australia) M Ebden	6	5	6^{1}
4	(Belgium) D Goffin	2	7	7^{7}
8	(Argentina) D Schwartzman	6	6
(Australia) B Tomic	3	1
SE	(Ukraine) A Dolgopolov	2	4
(United States) S Johnson	6	6

Quarterfinals
(France) R Gasquet	5	2
4	(Belgium) D Goffin	7	6
8	(Argentina) D Schwartzman	6	7
(United States) S Johnson	0	5

Semifinals
4	(Belgium) D Goffin	7^{7}	7^{8}
8	(Argentina) D Schwartzman	6^{3}	6^{6}

== Qualifying ==
=== Seeds ===
1. (United States) Frances Tiafoe (qualifying competition)
2. (Canada) Vasek Pospisil (qualifying competition)
3. (Argentina) Nicolás Kicker (first round)
4. (Moldova) Radu Albot (qualifying competition)
5. (Chile) Nicolás Jarry (first round)
6. (Greece) Stefanos Tsitsipas (qualified)
7. (Spain) Adrián Menéndez-Maceiras (first round)
8. (Germany) Yannick Hanfmann (qualifying competition)

=== Qualifiers ===
1. (Greece) Stefanos Tsitsipas
2. (Japan) Yusuke Takahashi
3. (Australia) Matthew Ebden
4. (Croatia) Franko Škugor

=== Qualifying draw ===
==== First qualifier ====
First round
1	(United States) Frances Tiafoe	6	6
WC	(Japan) Kaito Uesugi	2	4
(Japan) Tatsuma Ito	6	6^{5}	2
6	(Greece) Stefanos Tsitsipas	4	7^{7}	6

Qualifying competition
1	(United States) Frances Tiafoe	4	2
6	(Greece) Stefanos Tsitsipas	6	6

==== Second qualifier ====
First round
2	(Canada) Vasek Pospisil	7^{7}	7^{7}
WC	(Japan) Yosuke Watanuki	6^{5}	6^{5}
(Japan) Yusuke Takahashi	6	6
7	(Spain) Adrián Menéndez-Maceiras	1	2

Qualifying competition
2	(Canada) Vasek Pospisil	6^{1}	2
(Japan) Yusuke Takahashi	7^{7}	6

==== Third qualifier ====
First round
3	(Argentina) Nicolás Kicker	4	6^{4}
(Australia) Matthew Ebden	6	7^{7}
WC	(Japan) Sho Shimabukuro	3	4
8	(Germany) Yannick Hanfmann	6	6

Qualifying competition
(Australia) Matthew Ebden	6	6
8	(Germany) Yannick Hanfmann	3	1

==== Fourth qualifier ====
First round
4	(Moldova) Radu Albot	7	6^{4}	7^{7}
(United States) Reilly Opelka	5	7^{7}	6^{3}
Alt	(Croatia) Franko Škugor	6	6
5	(Chile) Nicolás Jarry	4	4

Qualifying competition
4	(Moldova) Radu Albot	6	5	3
Alt	(Croatia) Franko Škugor	1	7	6
