= Masters France =

Professional tennis tournament

Defunct tennis tournament
- Founded: 2008
- Abolished: 2009
- Location: Toulouse; France
- Venue: Palais des Sports de Toulouse
- Surface: Hard (i)
- Draw: 8S (Round Robin)
- Prize money: €280,000

The Masters France was a non-ATP affiliated professional tennis tournament held in the Palais des Sports de Toulouse, France in December 2008 and December 2009. Sponsored by BNP Paribas, it took the form of an exhibition round-robin for men's singles players only, and was held indoors on Plexicushion hard courts. The qualifying players for the event were the top seven French men's players of the year, determined by their accumulative performance in the four ATP tournaments held in France that year: the Marseille Open 13; the Metz Open de Moselle; the Grand Prix de Tennis de Lyon; and the Paris BNP Paribas Masters. An eighth French player received a wild card.

== Creation and format ==
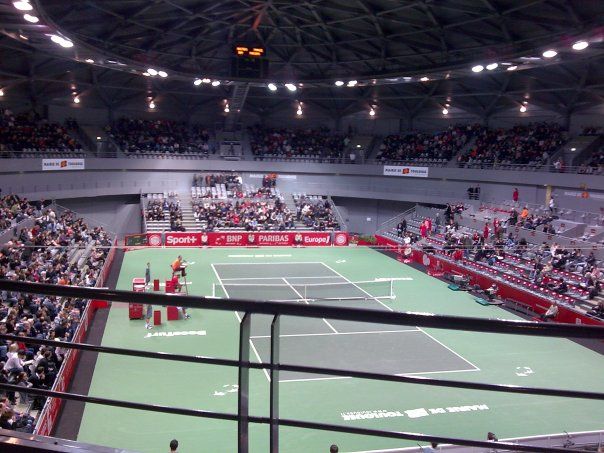
The main court in Toulouse during the 2008 Masters France

During the 2008 Open 13 tennis tournament in Marseille in February 2008, three former Davis Cup players for France – Jean-François Caujolle, Gilles Moretton and Jean-Louis Haillet – announced the creation of a special year-end event for French men's players. Initiated by them but with the participation of the French Tennis Federation (Fédération Française de Tennis – FFT), they intended the tournament to: firstly, reinforce competition in the four existing French ATP events; secondly, recreate an event similar to the defunct French National Singles Championships; and thirdly, bring back a large tennis event to Toulouse after the discontinuation of the Grand Prix de Tennis de Toulouse in 2000.

The Masters France was conceived as a round robin tournament with two groups of four players, matches played in two sets and a match tie-break, no semi-finals, and competed for by the seven players who had won the most ATP points in the four French men's ATP events of Marseille, Metz, Lyon, and Paris, plus an additional wild card player. With prize money of €280,000, the event was originally to be played in November, right after the Paris BNP Paribas Masters. However, it was subsequently moved to late December and the playing surface was changed from a fast indoor hard court to a slower Plexicushion court in order to transform the event into a warm-up tournament for the Australian Open, held in January of the following year.

The tournament was held just twice, in 2008 and 2009.

== 2008 event ==
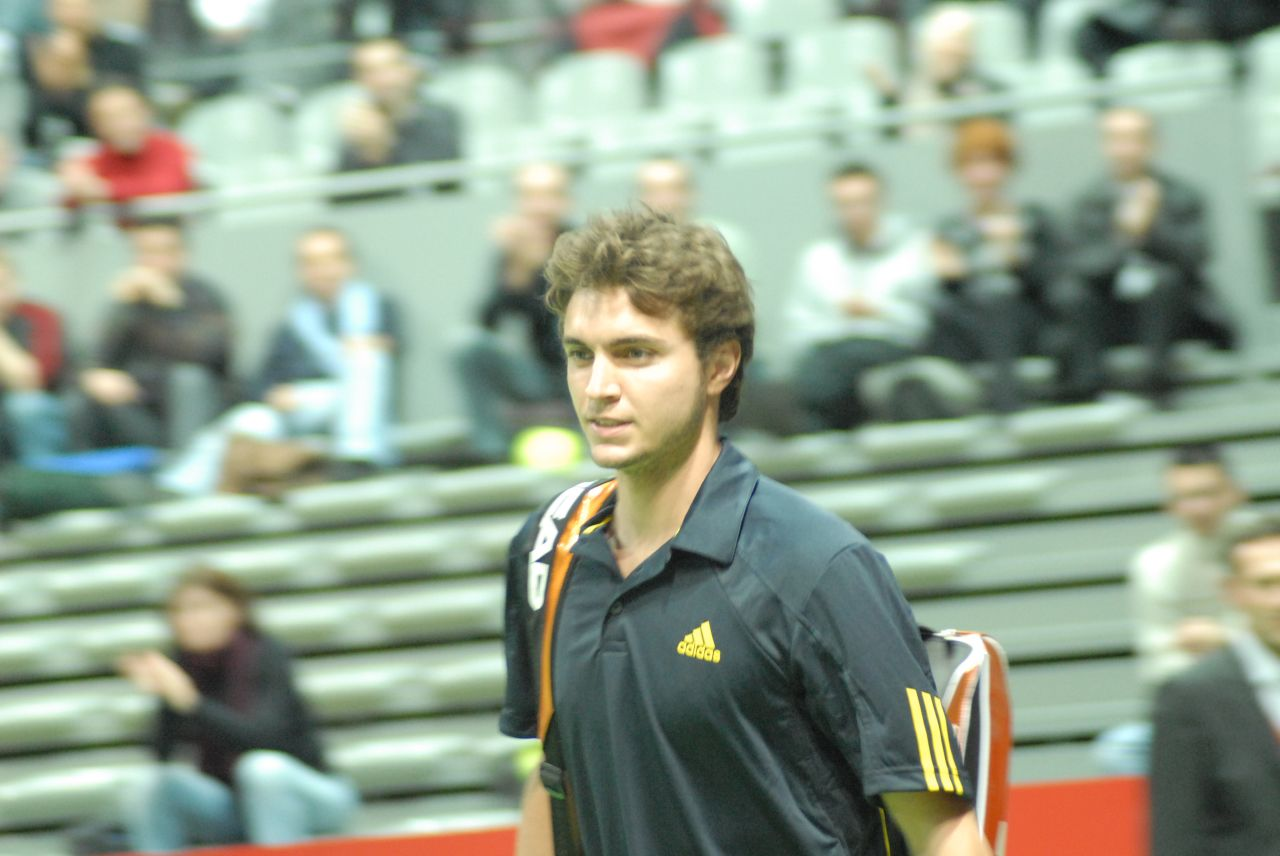
French No. 2 Gilles Simon, winner of the inaugural 2008 Masters France over Michaël Llodra

=== Qualifiers ===
The first Masters France was scheduled to be played from December 18 through December 21 2008, with Jo-Wilfried Tsonga, Paul-Henri Mathieu, Gilles Simon, Julien Benneteau, Adrian Mannarino, Nicolas Mahut, Marc Gicquel, and Richard Gasquet as the wild card. Tsonga decided to withdraw on December 2, explaining he wanted to delay his return to competition and set up his own December preparation for the 2009 Australian Open. He was replaced by Michaël Llodra. Gasquet also withdrew on December 9 due to a lack of preparation, having been sidelined for several weeks due to injury, and was replaced by Arnaud Clément. Mahut eventually pulled out on December 16, two days before the event, and was replaced by Lyon quarterfinalist and Rennes Challenger winner Josselin Ouanna.

=== Results ===
Gicquel, Ouanna, Clément and Mannarino were eliminated in the round robin stage of the event, with Julien Benneteau and Paul-Henri Mathieu qualifying for the third place match, and Gilles Simon and Michaël Llodra for the final.

The third place match was dominated by Mathieu until 7–5, 4–4, when Benneteau managed to break back. He kept his momentum to win the match tie-break and clinch the tournament's third place, with a final score of 5–7, 6–4, 10–4.

The final saw the Tennis Masters Cup semifinalist Simon take the early advantage, breaking Llodra twice to lead 5–1 before the Adelaide and Rotterdam winner lined up six straight games to win the set 7–5. Both players broke each other repeatedly in the second set until the tie-break, where Simon saved two match points and snatched the set 7–6(7). Already hampered by an arm strain Llodra decided to retire, allowing Gilles Simon – the World No. 7, and winner of that season's Casablanca, Indianapolis and Bucharest tournaments – to become the first champion of the Masters France.

- Paul-Henri Mathieu (fourth place)
- Gilles Simon (champion)
- Julien Benneteau (third place)
- Adrian Mannarino (round robin)
- Marc Gicquel (round robin)
- Michaël Llodra (Second Place, retired due to an arm injury)
- Josselin Ouanna (round robin)
- Arnaud Clément (round robin)

=== Draw ===
==== Key ====
- DNQ = Did not qualify
- DNP = Did not play
- W = Winner
- F = Final
- SF = Semi-final
- QF = Quarter-final
- R1/2/3 = Round 1/2/3

| Seed | Player | Marseille (32 draw) | Metz (32) | Lyon (32) | Paris (48 - byes) |
|---|---|---|---|---|---|
| 1 | Paul-Henri Mathieu | Semi-finals | Final | Round 2 | Round 1 |
| 2 | Gilles Simon | Quarter-finals | Round 1 | Semi-finals | Round 3 |
| 3 | Julien Benneteau | Round 2 | Round 1 | Final | DNP |
| 4 | Adrian Mannarino | DNQ | Semi-finals | DNQ | Round 1 |
| 5 | Marc Gicquel | Round 1 | Quarter-finals | Round 1 | Round 1 |
| 6 | Michaël Llodra | Round 2 | Round 1 | Round 1 | DNP |
| 7 | Josselin Ouanna | DNP | DNP | Quarter-finals | Round 1 |
| 8 | Arnaud Clément | Round 1 | Round 1 | Round 1 | DNQ |

Original qualifiers who later withdrew:

- Jo-Wilfried Tsonga - Marseille: R1, Metz: DNP, Lyon:SF, Paris: W
- Nicolas Mahut - Marseille: QF, Metz: R2, Lyon: R1, Paris: DNQ
- Richard Gasquet - Marseille: R2, Metz: DNP, Lyon: R2, Paris: DNP

==== Red group ====
| | | Simon | Benneteau | Gicquel | Ouanna | RR W–L | Set W–L | Game W–L | Standings |
| 1 | Gilles Simon | | 6–3, 7–5 | 6–4, 6–3 | 7–6(6), 7–5 | 3–0 | 6–0 | 37–26 | 1 |
| 2 | Julien Benneteau | 3–6, 5–7 | | 7–6(10), 7–5 | 6–4, 4–6, [10–6] | 2–1 | 4–3 | 31–34 | 2 |
| 3 | Marc Gicquel | 4–6, 3–6 | 6–7(10), 5–7 | | 4–6, 6–4, [10–3] | 1–2 | 2–5 | 29–34 | 3 |
| 4 | Josselin Ouanna | 6–7(6), 5–7 | 4–6, 6–4, [6–10] | 6–4, 4–6, [3–10] | | 0–3 | 2–6 | 31–34 | 4 |

Standings are determined by: 1. number of wins; 2. number of matches; 3. in two-players-ties, head-to-head records; 4. in three-players-ties, percentage of sets won, or of games won; 5. steering-committee decision.

==== Blue group ====
| | | Mathieu | Llodra | Clément | Mannarino | RR W–L | Set W–L | Game W–L | Standings |
| 1 | Paul-Henri Mathieu | | 4–6, 4–6 | 6–4, 6–0 | 6–1, 6–2 | 2–1 | 4–2 | 32–19 | 2 |
| 2 | Michaël Llodra | 6–4, 6–4 | | 6–4, 3–6, [10–6] | 6–3, 6–2 | 3–0 | 6–1 | 34–23 | 1 |
| 3 | Arnaud Clément | 4–6, 0–6 | 4–6, 6–3, [6–10] | | 6–1, 6–4 | 1–2 | 3–4 | 26–27 | 3 |
| 4 | Adrian Mannarino | 1–6, 2–6 | 3–6, 3–6 | 1–6, 4–6 | | 0–3 | 0–6 | 13–36 | 4 |

Standings are determined by: 1. number of wins; 2. number of matches; 3. in two-players-ties, head-to-head records; 4. in three-players-ties, percentage of sets won, or of games won; 5. steering-committee decision.

==== Finals ====
Gilles Simon won in the final 5–7, 7–6^{(9–7)}, after Michaël Llodra retired due to an arm injury.

| Final | | | |
| Gilles Simon | 5 | 7 | |
| Michaël Llodra | 7 | 6^{7} | r |

| Third place match | | | |
| Julien Benneteau | 5 | 6 | [10] |
| Paul-Henri Mathieu | 7 | 4 | [4] |

== 2009 event ==
=== Qualifiers ===
The qualifiers were: Michaël Llodra, Arnaud Clément, Julien Benneteau, Paul-Henri Mathieu, David Guez, Marc Gicquel, Thierry Ascione, Jérémy Chardy, and Laurent Recouderc. Gilles Simon was the defending champion, but chose not to participate this year.

=== Results ===
Mathieu, Guez, Ascione and Chardy were eliminated in the round robin stage of the event, with Michael Llodra and Marc Gicquel qualifying for the third place match, and Julien Benneteau and Arnaud Clement for the final.

Julien Benneteau won the final 7–6(2), 6–2, against Arnaud Clément.

- Michaël Llodra (third place)
- Arnaud Clément (second place)
- Julien Benneteau (champion)
- Paul-Henri Mathieu (round robin)
- David Guez (round robin)
- Marc Gicquel (fourth place)
- Thierry Ascione (round robin)
- Jérémy Chardy (round robin, withdrew due to a back injury)
- Laurent Recouderc (round robin)

=== Draw ===
==== Key ====
- Q = Qualifier
- WC = Wild card
- LL = Lucky loser
- Alt = Alternate
- ITF = ITF entry
- PR = Protected ranking
- SR = Special ranking
- SE = Special exempt
- JE = Junior exempt
- JR = Junior Accelerator Programme entrant
- CO = College Accelerator Programme entrant
- NG = Next Gen Accelerator Program entrant
- w/o = Walkover
- r = Retired
- d = Defaulted

==== Red group ====
| | | Clément | Gicquel | Ascione | Chardy Recouderc | RR W–L | Set W–L | Game W–L | Standings |
| 1 | Arnaud Clément | | 4–6, 6–3, [11–9] | 6–4, 6–4 | 2–6, 6–1, [1–0] ret. (w/ Chardy) | 3–0 | 6–2 | 31–24 | 1 |
| 2 | Marc Gicquel | 6–4, 3–6, [9–11] | | 7–5, 6–1 | 6–2, 7–5 (w/ Recouderc) | 2–1 | 5–2 | 35–24 | 2 |
| 3 | Thierry Ascione | 4–6, 4–6 | 5–7, 1–6 | | 6–4, 6–0 (w/ Recouderc) | 1–2 | 2–4 | 26–29 | 3 |
| 4 | Jérémy Chardy Laurent Recouderc | 6–2, 1–6, [0–1] ret. (w/ Chardy) | 2–6, 5–7 (w/ Recouderc) | 4–6, 0–6 (w/ Recouderc) | | 0–1 0–2 | 1–1 0–4 | 7–8 11–25 | X 4 |

Standings are determined by: 1. number of wins; 2. number of matches; 3. in two-players-ties, head-to-head records; 4. in three-players-ties, percentage of sets won, or of games won; 5. steering-committee decision.

==== Blue group ====
| | | Llodra | Benneteau | Mathieu | Guez | RR W–L | Set W–L | Game W–L | Standings |
| 1 | Michaël Llodra | | 2–6, 6–7(4) | 6–2, 6–2 | 6–3, 3–6, [10–2] | 2–1 | 4–3 | 30–26 | 2 |
| 2 | Julien Benneteau | 6–2, 7–6(4) | | w/o | 6–2, 2–6, [12–10] | 3–0 | 4–1 | 22–16 | 1 |
| 3 | Paul-Henri Mathieu | 2–6, 2–6 | w/o | | 4–6, 2–6 | 0–3 | 0–4 | 10–24 | 4 |
| 4 | David Guez | 3–6, 6–3, [2–10] | 2–6, 6–2, [10–12] | 6–4, 6–2 | | 1–2 | 4–4 | 29–25 | 3 |

Standings are determined by: 1. number of wins; 2. number of matches; 3. in two-players-ties, head-to-head records; 4. in three-players-ties, percentage of sets won, or of games won; 5. steering-committee decision.

==== Finals ====
| Final | | |
| Arnaud Clément | 6^{2} | 2 |
| Julien Benneteau | 7 | 6 |

| Third place match | | | |
| Marc Gicquel | 7 | 4 | [8] |
| Michaël Llodra | 5 | 6 | [10] |
