= 2021 Hall of Fame Open – Doubles =

Tennis tournament

Doubles
- 2021 Hall of Fame Open

Final
- Champions: (United States) William Blumberg; (United States) Jack Sock
- Runners-up: (United States) Austin Krajicek; (Canada) Vasek Pospisil
- Score: 6–2, 7–6^{(7–3)}

Events
Singles	Doubles
- Hall of Fame Open

Marcel Granollers and Sergiy Stakhovsky were the reigning champions from when the tournament was last held in 2019, but chose not to defend their title.

William Blumberg and Jack Sock won the title, defeating Austin Krajicek and Vasek Pospisil in the final, 6–2, 7–6^{(7–3)}.

== Seeds ==
1. (New Zealand) Marcus Daniell / (Japan) Ben McLachlan (first round)
2. (Israel) Jonathan Erlich / (Mexico) Santiago González (semifinals)
3. (Finland) Harri Heliövaara / (Australia) John-Patrick Smith (quarterfinals)
4. (United Kingdom) Luke Bambridge / (Australia) Matt Reid (withdrew)

== Draw ==
Key

- Q = Qualifier
- WC = Wild card
- LL = Lucky loser
- Alt = Alternate
- ITF = ITF entry
- PR = Protected ranking
- SR = Special ranking
- SE = Special exempt
- JE = Junior exempt
- JR = Junior Accelerator Programme entrant
- CO = College Accelerator Programme entrant
- NG = Next Gen Accelerator Program entrant
- w/o = Walkover
- r = Retired
- d = Defaulted

=== Draw ===
First round

Quarterfinals

Semifinals

Final

1
- (New Zealand) M Daniell
- (Japan) B McLachlan
5
3

(United States) A Krajicek
(Canada) V Pospisil
7
6

(United States) A Krajicek
(Canada) V Pospisil
6
7^{14}

(United States) H Reese
(Netherlands) S Verbeek
6
7

- (United States) H Reese
- (Netherlands) S Verbeek
3
6^{12}

- (Germany) P Gojowczyk
- (Spain) B Zapata Miralles
1
5

(United States) A Krajicek
(Canada) V Pospisil
w/o

Alt
(Japan) Y Nishioka
(Japan) Y Uchiyama
1
7
[10]

- (Portugal) J Sousa
- (Australia) J Thompson

- (Pakistan) A-u-H Qureshi
- (India) R Ramanathan
6
5
[7]

Alt
- (Japan) Y Nishioka
- (Japan) Y Uchiyama
3
6^{5}

(Portugal) J Sousa
(Australia) J Thompson
6
6

(Portugal) J Sousa
(Australia) J Thompson
6
7^{7}

- (France) S Doumbia
- (France) F Reboul
4
2

- (United States) A Krajicek
- (Canada) V Pospisil
2
6^{3}

- (United States) D Kudla
- (United States) T Sandgren
6^{3}
7
[6]

WC
(United States) W Blumberg
(United States) J Sock
6
7^{7}

WC
(United States) W Blumberg
(United States) J Sock
7^{7}
5
[10]

WC
(United States) W Blumberg
(United States) J Sock
6
6

- (United States) N Lammons
- (United States) J Withrow
4
7^{7}
[7]

3
- (Finland) H Heliövaara
- (Australia) J-P Smith
4
3

3
(Finland) H Heliövaara
(Australia) J-P Smith
6
6^{2}
[10]

WC
(United States) W Blumberg
(United States) J Sock
7^{7}
6

- (United States) R Galloway
- (United States) A Lawson
6
6^{2}
[8]

2
- (Israel) J Erlich
- (Mexico) S González
6^{0}
3

WC
(Kazakhstan) A Bublik
(United States) D Novikov
4
7^{7}
[10]

WC
- (Kazakhstan) A Bublik
- (United States) D Novikov

- (Philippines) T Huey
- (Mexico) MÁ Reyes-Varela
6^{4}
3

2
(Israel) J Erlich
(Mexico) S González
w/o

2
(Israel) J Erlich
(Mexico) S González
7^{7}
6
