= 2019 Hall of Fame Open – Singles =

Singles
- 2019 Hall of Fame Open

Final
- Champion: (United States) John Isner
- Runner-up: (Kazakhstan) Alexander Bublik
- Score: 7–6^{(7–2)}, 6–3

Details
- Draw: 28 (4 Q / 3 WC )
- Seeds: 8

Events
Singles	Doubles
- Hall of Fame Open

Steve Johnson was the defending champion,.but lost in the first round to Christopher Eubanks.

John Isner won a record fourth Newport title, defeating Alexander Bublik in the final, 7–6^{(7–2)}, 6–3.

== Seeds ==
The top four seeds receive a bye into the second round.

1. (United States) John Isner (champion)
2. (France) Adrian Mannarino (second round)
3. (Australia) Jordan Thompson (second round)
4. (France) Ugo Humbert (semifinals)
5. (United States) Steve Johnson (first round)
6. (Croatia) Ivo Karlović (first round)
7. (Kazakhstan) Alexander Bublik (final)
8. (United States) Bradley Klahn (first round)

== Draw ==
Key

- Q = Qualifier
- WC = Wild card
- LL = Lucky loser
- Alt = Alternate
- ITF = ITF entry
- PR = Protected ranking
- SR = Special ranking
- SE = Special exempt
- JE = Junior exempt
- JR = Junior Accelerator Programme entrant
- CO = College Accelerator Programme entrant
- NG = Next Gen Accelerator Program entrant
- w/o = Walkover
- r = Retired
- d = Defaulted

=== Finals ===
Semifinals
1/WC	(United States) John Isner	6^{4}	7^{7}	6
4	(France) Ugo Humbert	7^{7}	6^{5}	3
(Spain) Marcel Granollers	6^{5}	6	4
7	(Kazakhstan) Alexander Bublik	7^{7}	3	6

Final
1/WC	(United States) John Isner	7^{7}	6
7	(Kazakhstan) Alexander Bublik	6^{2}	3

=== Top half ===
First round
WC	(United Kingdom) A Gray	3	4
(Poland) K Majchrzak	6	6
(Australia) M Ebden	6	2	6
(Canada) B Schnur	1	6	3
(United States) D Kudla	6	7^{7}
8	(United States) B Klahn	4	6^{5}
Q	(India) R Ramanathan	5	7^{8}	6
(Ukraine) S Stakhovsky	7	6^{6}	2
(Australia) B Tomic	2	6^{5}
(Belarus) I Ivashka	6	7^{7}
WC	(United States) C Eubanks	7^{11}	7^{7}
5	(United States) S Johnson	6^{9}	6^{5}

Second round
1/WC	(United States) J Isner	6	6^{5}	6
(Poland) K Majchrzak	4	7^{7}	3
(Australia) M Ebden	6	6
(United States) D Kudla	2	2
4	(France) U Humbert	7^{7}	6
Q	(India) R Ramanathan	6^{5}	0
(Belarus) I Ivashka	6	6
WC	(United States) C Eubanks	4	3

Quarterfinals
1/WC	(United States) J Isner	4	6	6
(Australia) M Ebden	6	3	4
4	(France) U Humbert	7	3	6
(Belarus) I Ivashka	5	6	2

Semifinals
1/WC	(United States) J Isner	6^{4}	7^{7}	6
4	(France) U Humbert	7^{7}	6^{5}	3

=== Bottom half ===
First round
6	(Croatia) I Karlović	6^{6}	6^{7}
(Argentina) G Andreozzi	7^{8}	7^{9}
(Germany) M Zverev	6	7^{7}
Q	(United States) T Smyczek	3	6^{4}
(Spain) M Granollers	6	6
(India) P Gunneswaran	2	2
7	(Kazakhstan) A Bublik	6	2	7^{7}
Q	(Australia) A Bolt	4	6	6^{4}
Q	(Serbia) V Troicki	3	7	7
(Chinese Taipei) J Jung	6	5	5
(Uzbekistan) D Istomin	4	7	4
(United States) T Sandgren	6	5	6

Second round
(Argentina) G Andreozzi	4	4
(Germany) M Zverev	6	6
(Spain) M Granollers	6	7^{8}
3	(Australia) J Thompson	2	6^{6}
7	(Kazakhstan) A Bublik	3	6	6
Q	(Serbia) V Troicki	6	3	3
(United States) T Sandgren	6	6
2	(France) A Mannarino	4	1

Quarterfinals
(Germany) M Zverev	3	0
(Spain) M Granollers	6	6
7	(Kazakhstan) A Bublik	0	6	6
(United States) T Sandgren	6	3	0

Semifinals
(Spain) M Granollers	6^{5}	6	4
7	(Kazakhstan) A Bublik	7^{7}	3	6

== Qualifying ==
=== Seeds ===
1. (United States) Bjorn Fratangelo (qualifying competition)
2. (Australia) Alex Bolt (qualified)
3. (India) Ramkumar Ramanathan (qualified)
4. (Japan) Tatsuma Ito (first round)
5. (France) Quentin Halys (first round)
6. (Serbia) Viktor Troicki (qualified)
7. (United States) Noah Rubin (qualifying competition)
8. (United States) Mitchell Krueger (first round)

=== Qualifiers ===
1. (Serbia) Viktor Troicki
2. (Australia) Alex Bolt
3. (India) Ramkumar Ramanathan
4. (United States) Tim Smyczek

=== Qualifying draw ===
==== First qualifier ====
First round
1	(United States) Bjorn Fratangelo	6	6
(United States) Thai-Son Kwiatkowski	1	4
WC	(United States) Karl Poling	1	4
6	(Serbia) Viktor Troicki	6	6

Qualifying competition
1	(United States) Bjorn Fratangelo	2	3
6	(Serbia) Viktor Troicki	6	6

==== Second qualifier ====
First round
2	(Australia) Alex Bolt	6	6
(Russia) Evgeny Karlovskiy	2	2
PR	(Israel) Amir Weintraub	1	1
7	(United States) Noah Rubin	6	6

Qualifying competition
2	(Australia) Alex Bolt	6	6
7	(United States) Noah Rubin	3	4

==== Third qualifier ====
First round
3	(India) Ramkumar Ramanathan	7^{7}	6
WC	(United States) Maxime Cressy	6^{5}	3
(Japan) Yūichi Sugita	7	6
5	(France) Quentin Halys	5	4

Qualifying competition
3	(India) Ramkumar Ramanathan	6	6^{6}	6
(Japan) Yūichi Sugita	4	7^{8}	3

==== Fourth qualifier ====
First round
4	(Japan) Tatsuma Ito	2	6	3
(Australia) John-Patrick Smith	6	3	6
(United States) Tim Smyczek	6	6
8	(United States) Mitchell Krueger	3	1

Qualifying competition
(Australia) John-Patrick Smith	4	6	2
(United States) Tim Smyczek	6	3	6
