= 2023 Hall of Fame Open – Singles =

Singles
- 2023 Hall of Fame Open

Final
- Champion: (France) Adrian Mannarino
- Runner-up: (United States) Alex Michelsen
- Score: 6–2, 6–4

Details
- Draw: 28
- Seeds: 8

Events
Singles	Doubles
- Hall of Fame Open

Adrian Mannarino defeated Alex Michelsen in the final, 6–2, 6–4 to win the singles tennis title at the 2023 Hall of Fame Open. It was his third ATP Tour singles title.

Maxime Cressy was the defending champion, but lost in the first round to Michelsen.

== Seeds ==
The top four seeds received a bye into the second round.

1. (United States) Tommy Paul (quarterfinals)
2. (France) Adrian Mannarino (champion)
3. (France) Ugo Humbert (semifinals)
4. (United States) Mackenzie McDonald (quarterfinals)
5. (United States) Maxime Cressy (first round)
6. (Australia) Max Purcell (first round)
7. (Australia) Jordan Thompson (quarterfinals)
8. (France) Corentin Moutet (second round)

== Draw ==
Key

- Q = Qualifier
- WC = Wild card
- LL = Lucky loser
- Alt = Alternate
- ITF = ITF entry
- PR = Protected ranking
- SR = Special ranking
- SE = Special exempt
- JE = Junior exempt
- JR = Junior Accelerator Programme entrant
- CO = College Accelerator Programme entrant
- NG = Next Gen Accelerator Program entrant
- w/o = Walkover
- r = Retired
- d = Defaulted

=== Finals ===
Semifinals
(United States) John Isner	6^{6}	4
(United States) Alex Michelsen	7^{8}	6
3	(France) Ugo Humbert	4	3
2	(France) Adrian Mannarino	6	6

Final
(United States) Alex Michelsen	2	4
2	(France) Adrian Mannarino	6	6

=== Top half ===
First round
WC	(United States) E Quinn	6	6
Q	(India) M Sasikumar	3	1
(United States) J Isner	6	2	6
Q	(Australia) A Bolt	4	6	3
WC	(United States) E Spizzirri	6^{7}	0
8	(France) C Moutet	7^{9}	6
Q	(Australia) L Tu	6	7^{8}
(Australia) A Vukic	3	6^{6}
(Australia) J Duckworth	5	6	7
(France) C Lestienne	7	4	5
(United States) A Michelsen	6^{5}	6	7
5	(United States) M Cressy	7^{7}	4	5

Second round
1	(United States) T Paul	6	6
WC	(United States) E Quinn	4	2
(United States) J Isner	6	6
8	(France) C Moutet	3	4
4	(United States) M McDonald	6	7^{7}
Q	(Australia) L Tu	4	6^{5}
(Australia) J Duckworth	6	3	0
(United States) A Michelsen	4	6	6

Quarterfinals
1	(United States) T Paul	6	3	6^{4}
(United States) J Isner	4	6	7^{7}
4	(United States) M McDonald	3	3
(United States) A Michelsen	6	6

Semifinals
(United States) J Isner	6^{6}	4
(United States) A Michelsen	7^{8}	6

=== Bottom half ===
First round
6	(Australia) M Purcell	4	1
(Netherlands) G Brouwer	6	6
(Canada) G Diallo	3	2
WC	(South Africa) K Anderson	6	6
Q	(South Korea) Y-s Chung	2	3
(United States) S Johnson	6	6
7	(Australia) J Thompson	6	6
(United States) A Kovacevic	0	1
(United Kingdom) L Broady	6	7
(Japan) S Mochizuki	1	5
(Jordan) A Shelbayh	3	4
(Australia) R Hijikata	6	6

Second round
(Netherlands) G Brouwer	3	6^{6}
WC	(South Africa) K Anderson	6	7^{8}
(United States) S Johnson	4	4
3	(France) U Humbert	6	6
7	(Australia) J Thompson	6	6
(United Kingdom) L Broady	2	2
(Australia) R Hijikata	3	4
2	(France) A Mannarino	6	6

Quarterfinals
WC	(South Africa) K Anderson	2	4
3	(France) U Humbert	6	6
7	(Australia) J Thompson	0	7^{7}	2
2	(France) A Mannarino	6	6^{4}	6

Semifinals
3	(France) U Humbert	4	3
2	(France) A Mannarino	6	6

== Qualifying ==
=== Seeds ===
1. (Turkey) Altuğ Çelikbilek (qualifying competition)
2. (Kazakhstan) Beibit Zhukayev (qualifying competition)
3. (Australia) Li Tu (qualified)
4. (Tunisia) Skander Mansouri (qualifying competition)
5. (South Korea) Chung Yun-seong (qualified)
6. (United States) Evan Zhu (first round)
7. (Ukraine) Illya Marchenko (qualifying competition)
8. (Australia) Alex Bolt (qualified)

=== Qualifiers ===
1. (India) Mukund Sasikumar
2. (South Korea) Chung Yun-seong
3. (Australia) Li Tu
4. (Australia) Alex Bolt

=== Qualifying draw ===
==== First qualifier ====
First round
1	(Turkey) Altuğ Çelikbilek	6	7^{7}
WC	(United States) Alafia Ayeni	2	6^{5}
(India) Mukund Sasikumar	4	6	6
6	(United States) Evan Zhu	6	2	3

Qualifying competition
1	(Turkey) Altuğ Çelikbilek	5	3
(India) Mukund Sasikumar	7	6

==== Second qualifier ====
First round
2	(Kazakhstan) Beibit Zhukayev	6^{4}	6	6
(France) Jaimee Floyd Angele	7^{7}	4	4
WC	(United States) Gage Brymer	3	6^{8}
5	(South Korea) Chung Yun-seong	6	7^{10}

Qualifying competition
2	(Kazakhstan) Beibit Zhukayev	4	3
5	(South Korea) Chung Yun-seong	6	6

==== Third qualifier ====
First round
3	(Australia) Li Tu	6	6^{4}	6
(Croatia) Matija Pecotić	3	7^{7}	2
(United States) Donald Young	1	3
7	(Ukraine) Illya Marchenko	6	6

Qualifying competition
3	(Australia) Li Tu	6	6
7	(Ukraine) Illya Marchenko	3	2

==== Fourth qualifier ====
First round
4	(Tunisia) Skander Mansouri	6	7
PR	(Canada) Peter Polansky	2	5
(India) Ramkumar Ramanathan	3	3
8	(Australia) Alex Bolt	6	6

Qualifying competition
4	(Tunisia) Skander Mansouri	4	1
8	(Australia) Alex Bolt	6	6
