= 2023 Hall of Fame Open =

- Date: July 17–23
- Edition: 47th
- Category: ATP Tour 250
- Prize money: $642,735
- Surface: Grass / outdoor
- Location: Newport, Rhode Island, United States
- Venue: International Tennis Hall of Fame

Champions

Singles
- (France) Adrian Mannarino

Doubles
- (United States) Nathaniel Lammons / (United States) Jackson Withrow
- Hall of Fame Open

The 2023 Hall of Fame Open (also known as the Infosys Hall of Fame Open for sponsorship reasons) was a men's professional tennis tournament played on outdoor grass courts. It was the 47th edition of the event, and was categorized as an ATP 250 event on the 2023 ATP Tour. It took place at the International Tennis Hall of Fame in Newport, Rhode Island, United States, from July 17 through July 23, 2023.

== Champions ==
=== Singles ===
- (France) Adrian Mannarino def. (United States) Alex Michelsen, 6–2, 6–4

=== Doubles ===
- (United States) Nathaniel Lammons / (United States) Jackson Withrow def. (United States) William Blumberg / (Australia) Max Purcell, 6–3, 5–7, [10–5]

== Points and prize money ==
=== Point distribution ===
Event	W	F	SF	QF	Round of 16	Round of 32	Q	Q2	Q1
Singles	250	150	90	45	20	0	12	6	0
Doubles	250	150	90	45	0	—N/a	—N/a	—N/a	—N/a

=== Prize money ===
Event	W	F	SF	QF	Round of 16	Round of 32	Q2	Q1
Singles	$97,760	$57,025	$33,525	$19,425	$11,280	$6,895	$3,445	$1,880
Doubles*	$33,960	$18,170	$10,660	$5,950	$3,510	—N/a	—N/a	—N/a

_{*per team}

== Singles main draw entrants ==
=== Seeds ===
Country	Player	Rank^{1}	Seed
USA	Tommy Paul	15	1
FRA	Adrian Mannarino	35	2
FRA	Ugo Humbert	39	3
USA	Mackenzie McDonald	54	4
USA	Maxime Cressy	58	5
AUS	Max Purcell	64	6
AUS	Jordan Thompson	70	7
FRA	Corentin Moutet	71	8

- ^{1} Rankings are as of 3 July 2023.

=== Other entrants ===
The following players received wildcards into the main draw:

- (South Africa) Kevin Anderson
- (United States) Ethan Quinn
- (United States) Eliot Spizzirri

The following players received entry from the qualifying draw:

- (Australia) Alex Bolt
- (South Korea) Chung Yun-seong
- (India) Mukund Sasikumar
- (Australia) Li Tu

=== Withdrawals ===
- (Moldova) Radu Albot → replaced by (Jordan) Abdullah Shelbayh
- (United States) Christopher Eubanks → replaced by (United States) Steve Johnson
- (Germany) Dominik Koepfer → replaced by (Japan) Shintaro Mochizuki
- (Australia) Jason Kubler → replaced by (United States) Aleksandar Kovacevic
- (United States) Michael Mmoh → replaced by (United States) Alex Michelsen
- (Japan) Yosuke Watanuki → replaced by (Netherlands) Gijs Brouwer

== Doubles main draw entrants ==
=== Seeds ===
Country	Player	Country	Player	Rank^{1}	Seed
USA	Nathaniel Lammons	USA	Jackson Withrow	73	1
AUS	Rinky Hijikata	USA	Reese Stalder	117	2
IND	Yuki Bhambri	IND	Saketh Myneni	134	3
GBR	Julian Cash	USA	Maxime Cressy	135	4

- ^{1} Rankings are as of 3 July 2023.

=== Other entrants ===
The following pairs received wildcards into the doubles main draw:

- (South Africa) Kevin Anderson / (United States) Ethan Quinn
- (United States) Tommy Paul / (United States) Eliot Spizzirri

=== Withdrawals ===
- (United States) Christopher Eubanks / (United States) Reese Stalder → replaced by (Australia) Rinky Hijikata / (United States) Reese Stalder
- (Australia) Rinky Hijikata / (Australia) Jason Kubler → replaced by (France) Théo Arribagé / (France) Luca Sanchez
- (Brazil) Marcelo Melo / (Australia) John Peers → replaced by (South Korea) Chung Yun-seong / (United States) Aleksandar Kovacevic
