= Copa Internacional de Tenis Total Digest =

Defunct tennis tournament
- Location: Mexico City, Mexico
- Venue: Sayavedra Racquet Club
- Category: ATP Challenger Tour
- Surface: Hard
- Draw: 32S/16Q/16D
- Prize money: $35,000+H

The Copa Internacional de Tenis Total Digest was a tennis tournament held in Mexico City, Mexico, in 2013. The event was part of the ATP Challenger Tour and was played on hardcourts.

== Past finals ==
=== Singles ===
Year	Champion	Runner-up	Score
2013	(Slovakia) Andrej Martin	(France) Adrian Mannarino	4–6, 6–4, 6–1

=== Doubles ===
Year	Champions	Runners-up	Score
2013	(Australia) Carsten Ball (Australia) Chris Guccione	(Australia) Jordan Kerr (Australia) John-Patrick Smith	6–3, 3–6, [11–9]
