= Adrian Mannarino =

French tennis player (born 1988)

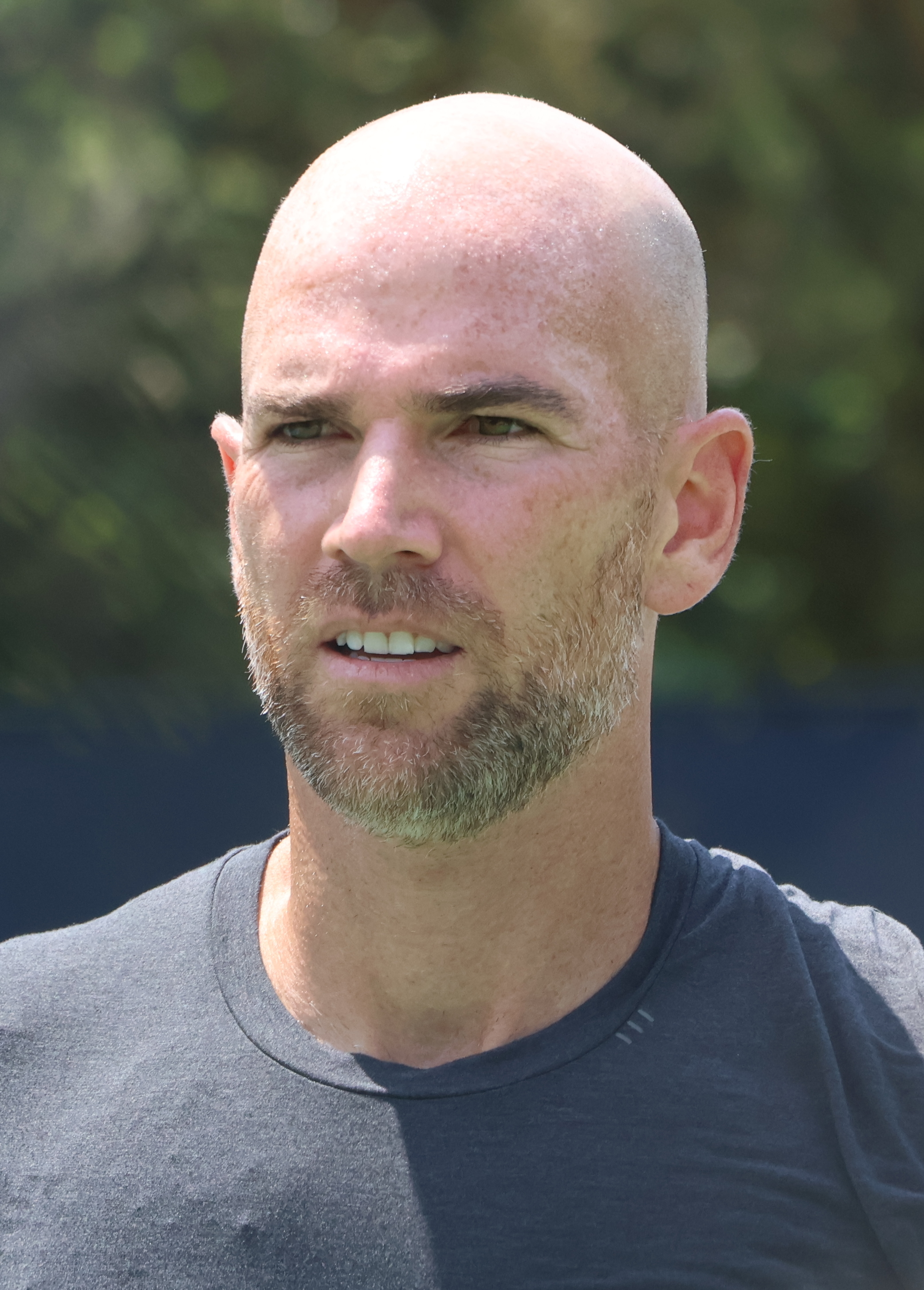
- Mannarino at the 2024 Washington Open
- Country (sports): France
- Born: 29 June 1988 (age 38) Soisy-sous-Montmorency, France
- Height: 1.80 m (5 ft 11 in)
- Turned pro: 2004
- Plays: Left-handed (two-handed backhand)
- Coach: Erwann Tortuyaux
- Prize money: US $15,238,259
- Official website: adrianmannarino.fr

Singles
- Career record: 328–381
- Career titles: 5
- Highest ranking: No. 17 (29 January 2024)
- Current ranking: No. 61 (9 November 2026)

Grand Slam singles results
- Australian Open: 4R (2022, 2024)
- French Open: 2R (2014, 2016, 2019)
- Wimbledon: 4R (2013, 2017, 2018)
- US Open: 4R (2025)

Doubles
- Career record: 46–123
- Career titles: 0
- Highest ranking: No. 73 (2 May 2016)

Grand Slam doubles results
- Australian Open: SF (2016)
- French Open: 2R (2017, 2020, 2022)
- Wimbledon: 2R (2023)
- US Open: 3R (2022)
- Last updated on: 31 August 2026.

Adrian Mannarino (Italian: [mannaˈriːno]; born 29 June 1988) is a French professional tennis player. He has a career-high ATP singles ranking of world No. 17, achieved on 29 January 2024 and a best doubles ranking of No. 73, reached on 2 May 2016. He is currently the No. 5 singles player from France. He has won five ATP Tour singles titles, three on hardcourts and two on grass.

== Professional career ==
=== 2007–2011 ===
Mannarino made his Grand Slam singles debut at the 2007 French Open, where as a wildcard, he lost in the first qualifying round to Marin Čilić in straight sets.

Mannarino received a wildcard for the singles main draw of his home Grand Slam tournament, the 2008 French Open, where he lost to Argentine qualifier Diego Junqueira in the first round in straight sets. He also received a wildcard for the 2008 French Open men's doubles (it was his Grand Slam men's doubles debut), losing in the first round.

Mannarino played at the 2008 Open de Moselle in France, entering the singles main draw as a qualifier; he reached the semifinals, defeating sixth seed Andreas Seppi in the first round, Rik de Voest in the second round, Marc Gicquel in the quarterfinals, before losing to Paul-Henri Mathieu in the semifinals in two tiebreaks. As a wildcard, he lost in the main draw singles first round of the 2008 Paris Masters to Dmitry Tursunov. In November 2008, he played in an ATP Challenger Tour tournament in Jersey, where, seeded fourth, he won the singles event, defeating Andreas Beck in two tiebreaks in the final. He participated in the inaugural Masters France in December 2008, an exhibition tournament, along with a number of top French players, but lost his three round-robin matches in straight sets to Paul-Henri Mathieu, Michaël Llodra and Arnaud Clément.

He received a main draw singles wildcard for the 2009 Australian Open, where he lost to 14th seed Fernando Verdasco in the first round.

In 2011, he lost in the main draw singles second round of the Australian Open and Wimbledon, falling to six-time champion Roger Federer in the latter in straight sets.

=== 2013–16: First Major singles fourth round, semifinal & Masters quarterfinal in doubles ===
At the 2013 Wimbledon Championships, Mannarino beat Pablo Andújar in the first round, losing only six games. He then reached the singles third round of a Grand Slam for the first time, after his second round opponent John Isner was forced to retire at 1–1 in the first set due to a knee injury. He then beat qualifier Dustin Brown, who had just beaten Lleyton Hewitt to reach the fourth round. He pushed veteran Łukasz Kubot to five sets in his fourth-round match, but ultimately lost, setting up an all-Polish quarterfinal between Kubot and up-and-coming player Jerzy Janowicz.

At the 2015 Miami Open, Mannarino was the 28th seed and thus received a bye into the second round where he defeated Albert Ramos Viñolas. He beat 7th seed and the 2014 Australian Open singles champion Stan Wawrinka in the third round but lost to unseeded Dominic Thiem in three sets in the fourth round.

Mannarino reached his first career Masters 1000 doubles quarterfinal at the 2015 Mutua Madrid Open. He and his partner Juan Sebastián Cabal were defeated in the quarterfinals by the Indian-Romanian pair and eventual champions Rohan Bopanna and Florin Mergea.

At the 2016 Australian Open, the unseeded pair of Mannarino and Lucas Pouille defeated three seeded pairs (including the top-seeded pair of Horia Tecău and Jean-Julien Rojer in the quarterfinals) to reach the semifinals, where they lost to Jamie Murray and Bruno Soares. That was Mannarino's first career Grand Slam doubles semifinal appearance.

=== 2017: First Masters 1000 quarterfinal & ATP 500 singles final ===
The unseeded Mannarino reached his third career ATP World Tour singles final at the 2017 Antalya Open; he defeated two seeded players Borna Ćorić (in the first round) and Fernando Verdasco (in the quarterfinals) to advance to the final, where he lost to Yūichi Sugita in straight sets.

At the Wimbledon Championships one week later, Mannarino upset no. 19 seed Feliciano López in the first round and no. 15 seed Gaël Monfils in the third round before losing to no. 2 seed Novak Djokovic in the fourth round.

He reached his first career ATP World Tour Masters 1000 singles quarterfinal at the 2017 Rogers Cup, where he upset no. 6 seed and world no. 10 Milos Raonic in the second round before losing to Denis Shapovalov in the quarterfinals.

The unseeded Mannarino defeated top seed and world no. 5 Marin Čilić (the biggest singles win of his career and his first career win over a member of the Top 5 in the ATP singles rankings) in the semifinals of the Japan Open to reach his first career ATP World Tour 500 Series singles final, where he lost to fourth-seeded David Goffin. In October, Mannarino reached his third ATP World Tour singles semifinal of 2017 at the Kremlin Cup, where he lost to Ričardas Berankis. The following week, the 7th seeded Mannarino lost in the quarterfinals of the Swiss Indoors to top seed Roger Federer in three sets.

=== 2018: Australian Open third round & top 25 singles debut ===
Mannarino played his first tournament of 2018 at the Sydney International. Seeded fifth, he reached the quarterfinals and lost to fourth seed Fabio Fognini. Seeded 26th at the Australian Open, he reached the singles main draw third round for the first time in his career where he lost to fifth seed Dominic Thiem in straight sets.

Mannarino made his Davis Cup debut in the 2018 Davis Cup World Group first round tie against the Netherlands, replacing Lucas Pouille who had withdrawn a few hours before the start of his first singles match on 2 February against Thiemo de Bakker because of torticollis. Mannarino lost his first singles match against Thiemo de Bakker (who was world no. 369 in the ATP singles rankings) in three sets but won his second singles match against Robin Haase in five sets to give the French an unassailable lead against the Dutch.

In the first week of February, the second-seeded Mannarino was upset by the unseeded Marcos Baghdatis in three sets in the second round of the Sofia Open. One week later, the fourth-seeded Mannarino lost in the semifinals of the New York Open to the second seed Sam Querrey in three tight sets. Mannarino lost before the quarterfinal round of the singles main draw of his next four ATP World Tour tournaments in Acapulco, Indian Wells, Miami and Monte-Carlo. Despite these results he reached a career-high singles ranking of No. 22 on 19 March 2018.

At the Barcelona Open, the 11th-seeded Mannarino held three match points in the final set of his third round match against the 5th-seeded Pablo Carreño Busta before the latter won the match by winning the tight final-set tie-break.

=== 2019: Maiden ATP Tour singles title in Rosmalen ===
Mannarino started his 2019 season at the Qatar ExxonMobil Open. He lost in the first round to Dušan Lajović. In Sydney, he was defeated in the first round by Australian wildcard Jordan Thompson. At the Australian Open, he fell in the first round to fifth seed Kevin Anderson.

As the top seed at the Open de Rennes, Mannarino was eliminated in the second round by Jurij Rodionov. At the Sofia Open, he was beaten in the first round by German qualifier Yannick Maden. Seeded fifth at the New York Open, he lost in the first round to eventual champion Reilly Opelka. Seeded eighth at the Delray Beach Open, he got his first win of the season by beating Brayden Schnur in the first round. He ended up losing in the quarterfinals to second seed John Isner. In Acapulco, he was defeated in the first round by third seed John Isner. At the Indian Wells Masters, he made it to the second round where he was eliminated by sixth seed Kei Nishikori; he served for the match at 6–5 in the third set but failed to close out the match. At the Miami Open, he was beaten in the second round by 13th seed Daniil Medvedev.

Starting his clay-court season at the Monte-Carlo Masters, Mannarino lost in the first round to Cameron Norrie. Seeded second at the BNP Paribas Primrose Bordeaux, he reached the quarterfinals where he fell to ninth seed and eventual finalist, Mikael Ymer. In Madrid, he was defeated in the final round of qualifying by Martin Kližan. However, due to the withdrawal of Jo-Wilfried Tsonga, he was awarded a lucky loser spot into the main draw. He lost in the second round to eighth seed and eventual finalist, Stefanos Tsitsipas. As the top seed in Lisbon, he suffered a second round loss at the hands of Steve Darcis. Seeded sixth at the Geneva Open, he lost in the first round to Albert Ramos Viñolas. At the French Open, he was knocked out of the tournament in the second round by 14th seed Gaël Monfils.

At the Rosmalen Grass Court Championships, his first grass-court tournament of the season, Mannarino reached the final by beating Dutch wildcard Thiemo de Bakker, fourth seed Fernando Verdasco, fifth seed David Goffin, and second seed Borna Ćorić. He defeated Jordan Thompson in the final to finally emerged victorious in an ATP Tour singles final after having lost all his previous six. Seeded second and two-time finalist at the Antalya Open, he reached the quarterfinals where he was beaten by eventual champion Lorenzo Sonego. At Wimbledon, he lost in the first round to 13th seed and 2017 finalist, Marin Čilić.

Seeded second at the Hall of Fame Open, Mannarino was defeated in the second round by Tennys Sandgren. In Washington, D.C., he was eliminated in the second round by lucky loser Norbert Gombos. At the Rogers Cup, he dismissed 11th seed Borna Ćorić from the tournament in the second round. He was beaten in the third round by seventh seed Fabio Fognini. Playing in Cincinnati, he lost in the third round to 16th seed and eventual finalist, David Goffin. At the US Open, he was defeated in the first round by Dan Evans.

Seeded seventh at the St. Petersburg Open, Mannarino fell in the second round to qualifier Egor Gerasimov. At the first edition of the Zhuhai Championships, he reached his second final of the season after wins over Chinese wildcard Ze Zhang, top seed Stefanos Tsitsipas, qualifier Damir Džumhur, and eighth seed Albert Ramos Viñolas. He lost in the championship match to seventh seed Alex de Minaur. In Tokyo, he was defeated in the first round by qualifier and eventual finalist, John Millman. At the Rolex Shanghai Masters, he fell in the first round of qualifying to Vasek Pospisil. Seeded seventh at the Kremlin Cup, he reached his third singles final of the season. He ended up losing to sixth seed and Russian Andrey Rublev. At the Vienna Open, he was beaten in the first round by Sam Querrey. His final tournament of the year was the Paris Masters. He defeated qualifier Casper Ruud in the first round. He lost in the second round to second seed Rafael Nadal.

Mannarino ended the year ranked 43.

=== 2020: Top 35 year-end ranking ===
Mannarino began his 2020 season at the Qatar ExxonMobil Open. Seeded seventh, he lost in the first round to Alexander Bublik. Seeded seventh at the Auckland Open, he was defeated in the first round by Andreas Seppi. At the Australian Open, he was eliminated in the first round by fifth seed and eventual finalist, Dominic Thiem.

After the Australian Open, Mannarino played at the Open Sud de France in Montpellier, France. He beat Alexei Popyrin in the first round to get his first win of the season. He was then beaten in the second round by top seed and eventual champion, Gaël Monfils. In Rotterdam, he lost in the first round to Pablo Carreño Busta. Seeded seventh at the Delray Beach Open, he suffered a first round defeat at the hands of Kwon Soon-woo. Competing in Acapulco, he failed to convert match points in the third set and was eventually eliminated by the seventh seed and 2014 champion, Grigor Dimitrov, in their second round three-set thriller. As the top seed at the Monterrey Challenger, he won the title beating Aleksandar Vukic in the final. The ATP tour canceled all tournaments from March through July due to the Coronavirus pandemic.

When the ATP resumed tournaments in August, Mannarino competed at the Cincinnati Open. He was beaten in the first round by John Millman. Seeded 32nd at the US Open, he made it to the third round where he lost to fifth seed and eventual finalist, Alexander Zverev.

In Rome, Mannarino was defeated in the first round by 13th seed Milos Raonic. At the Hamburg Open, he fell in the first round to Dušan Lajović. At the French Open, he suffered a first round loss to Albert Ramos Viñolas.

At the St. Petersburg Open, Mannarino was eliminated in the first round by qualifier Ilya Ivashka. Seeded eighth at the first edition of the Bett1Hulks Championship, he reached the quarterfinals where he lost to top seed and eventual champion, Alexander Zverev. Seeded third at the first edition of the Astana Open, he reached the final where he was defeated by fourth seed John Millman. In Paris, he made it to the third round where he fell in a tight three-set match to fourth seed and eventual finalist, Alexander Zverev. Playing his final tournament of the season at the Sofia Open, he reached the semifinal where he lost to Jannik Sinner, who would end up winning the title.

Mannarino ended the season ranked 35.

=== 2021: Second Masters 1000 doubles quarterfinal ===
Mannarino started his 2021 season at the Delray Beach Open. Seeded third, he lost in the second round to Cameron Norrie. Seeded 10th at the first edition of the Murray River Open, he was defeated in the second round by Marcos Giron. Seeded 32nd at the Australian Open, he reached the third round where he was eliminated by sixth seed Alexander Zverev.

As the top seed at the Singapore Open, Mannarino made it to the quarterfinals where he was beaten by sixth seed Radu Albot. In Rotterdam, he lost in the first round to Hubert Hurkacz; he led 4–1 in the second set and held two set points at 5–4, but he ultimately lost the set and the match. At the Mexican Open, he retired during his first-round encounter against fifth seed Grigor Dimitrov. Seeded 25th at the Miami Open, he was defeated in the third round by fifth seed Diego Schwartzman.

Starting the clay-court season at the Monte-Carlo Masters, Mannarino lost in the first round to qualifier Federico Delbonis. Seeded 17th at the Barcelona Open, he was eliminated in the second round by Albert Ramos Viñolas. In Madrid, he was beaten in the first round by Spanish wildcard Carlos Alcaraz. At the Italian Open, he was defeated in round one by qualifier Hugo Dellien. In doubles, he and Benoît Paire reached the quarterfinals where they lost to second seeds and eventual champions, Nikola Mektić/Mate Pavić. Seeded eighth at the Geneva Open, he was beaten in the first round by compatriot, Arthur Cazaux. Seeded fourth at the Belgrade Open, he lost in the second round to Fernando Verdasco. At the French Open, he was defeated in his first-round match by Aljaž Bedene.

Seeded seventh at the Stuttgart Open, his first grass-court tournament of the season, Mannarino fell in the first round to qualifier James Duckworth. Competing at the Queen's Club Championships in London, he was eliminated in the second round by sixth seed Dan Evans. At the first edition of the Mallorca Open, he won his first-round match over Jan-Lennard Struff. He advanced to the quarterfinals when his opponent, second seed Dominic Thiem, retired during their second round encounter due to a right wrist injury. He ended up getting beaten in his semifinal match by Sam Querrey. At Wimbledon, he retired during his first-round match against eight-time champion and former World Number 1, Roger Federer, due to slipping behind the baseline and injuring his right knee.

Mannarino returned in August at the US Open. He lost in the second round to third seed Stefanos Tsitsipas.

Seeded sixth in Sofia, Mannarino was defeated in the first round by Gianluca Mager. At the Indian Wells Masters, he fell in his first-round match to Andy Murray. After Indian Wells, he competed at the Kremlin Cup. He stunned top seed Andrey Rublev in the second round in a rematch of the 2019 final. He ended up losing in his quarterfinals match to lucky loser Ričardas Berankis. At the St. Petersburg Open, he was defeated in the first round by sixth seed Karen Khachanov. In Paris, he won his first-round match over Nikoloz Basilashvili. He lost in the second round to 15th seed Gaël Monfils. At the Stockholm Open, he fell in his first-round match to seventh seed Márton Fucsovics.

=== 2022: Major fourth round, second ATP title & maiden doubles final, French No. 1 ===
At the 2022 Australian Open Mannarino defeated the World No. 11 and tenth seed Hubert Hurkacz to advance to the third round for a second year in a row. He defeated 18th seed Aslan Karatsev to reach his first fourth round at this Major. He lost to 6th seed Rafael Nadal in straight sets with a first set tiebreak that went to 16–14 points and lasted nearly 30 minutes.

At the Rosmalen Grass Court Championships he reached his first semifinal of the season defeating Andreas Seppi, fourth seed Alex de Minaur and Brandon Nakashima before losing to top seed Daniil Medvedev.

At the 2022 Atlanta Open he reached his fifth quarterfinal of the season as a lucky loser defeating Peter Gojowczyk and debutant wildcard American Andres Martin.

At the 2022 Winston-Salem Open he reached the semifinals defeating fourth seed Maxime Cressy. Next he defeated second seed Botic van de Zandschulp to reach his first final since 2020. He won his second title defeating Laslo Djere in the final becoming the oldest champion at this tournament. As a result, he returned to the top 50 at world No. 45 in the rankings on 29 August 2022 becoming the French No. 2 player.

At the 2022 Astana Open he reached his seventh quarterfinal of the season defeating Stan Wawrinka, and lucky loser David Goffin. At the same tournament he also reached his maiden doubles final with compatriot Fabrice Martin defeating top seedsTim Pütz/Michael Venus, and Polish duo Hubert Hurkacz/Jan Zieliński in the semifinals. They lost to Croatian duo and second seeds Nikola Mektić/Mate Pavić in the final. He became French No. 1 at world No. 42 on 17 October 2022 ahead of Gaël Monfils.

=== 2023: Best season: Three titles, tenth top 10 win, fifteenth ATP final ===
Mannarino started his 2023 season by representing France at the United Cup. France was in Group F alongside Argentina and Croatia. Against Argentina, he beat Federico Coria. France won the tie over Argentina 5–0. Against Croatia, he lost to Borna Gojo in three sets. Croatia won the tie over France 3–2. In the end, France ended second in Group F. Seeded eighth at the ASB Classic in Auckland, he was defeated in the first round by J. J. Wolf. At the Australian Open, he lost in the second round to 22nd seed and world No. 24, Alex de Minaur.

After the Australian Open, Mannarino represented France in the Davis Cup tie against Hungary. He won his match over Márton Fucsovics. France won the tie 3–2 over Hungary to advance to the Davis Cup Finals. Seeded eighth at the Dallas Open, he reached the quarterfinals where he lost to eventual champion Wu Yibing. In Delray Beach, he beat ninth seed, J.J. Wolf, in the second round. He was defeated in the quarterfinals by top seed, world No. 7, and eventual champion, Taylor Fritz. As the top seed at the Monterrey Challenger, he lost in the first round to Aleksandar Kovacevic. At the Mexican Open, he was beaten in his first-round match by lucky loser Elias Ymer. At the Indian Wells Masters, he beat 2019 champion, Dominic Thiem, in the first round in three sets. He then knocked out 19th seed and world No. 21, Lorenzo Musetti, in the second round. He lost in the third round to 11th seed and world No. 13, Jannik Sinner, in straight sets despite having a set point at 6–5 in the first-set tie-break. In Miami, he beat 32nd seed and American, Ben Shelton, in the second round. In the third round, he stunned eighth seed, world No. 9, and 2021 champion, Hubert Hurkacz, in the third round to reach the fourth round for the third time in his career at this Masters 1000 tournament. He lost in the fourth round to American qualifier Christopher Eubanks.

Mannarino started his clay-court season at the Monte-Carlo Masters. He fell in the first round of qualifying to Ivan Gakhov. As the top seed at the Open de Oeiras, he lost in the second round to Kimmer Coppejans. In Madrid, he was defeated in the first round by Tomás Martín Etcheverry. Seeded third at the Open Aix Provence, he lost in the second round to compatriot Luca Van Assche. At the Italian Open, he was eliminated from the tournament in the first round by Thiago Monteiro. Seeded fourth at the BNP Paribas Primrose Bordeaux, he lost in the second round to Albert Ramos Viñolas. Seeded eighth at the Geneva Open, he was defeated in the second round by Ilya Ivashka. At the French Open, he lost in the first round to compatriot, Ugo Humbert, in straight sets.

Starting his grass-court season at the Libéma Open, Mannarino upset top seed, world No. 3, and previous year finalist, Daniil Medvedev, in the second round in three sets. This was his ninth career Top 10 win. At the next tournament, the 2023 Queen's Club Championships he defeated third seed Taylor Fritz also in the second round for his tenth Top 10 win. At the 2023 Mallorca Championships he reached his twelfth final but lost to first time champion Christopher Eubanks.

In July, Mannarino won his third title at the 2023 Hall of Fame Open in Newport, defeating Alex Michelsen in the final. He moved back into the Top 30 as a result.

In August, Mannarino reached the quarterfinal in Cincinnati, reaching a quarterfinal at an ATP Masters 1000 for the second time of his career. As a result, he was seeded 22nd at the US Open, where he reached the third round for the fifth time in his career. At the start of the Asian swing, Mannarino won his fourth career title at the 2023 Astana Open defeating Sebastian Korda in the final, becoming the first Frenchman to win two titles in the same season since 2020. As a result, he returned to the top 25 at world No. 23 in the singles rankings on 2 October 2023.

At the 2023 Sofia Open he recorded his 200th hard court career win and also 40th season win for the first time in his career becoming the first Frenchman to record this since Gael Monfils (44) in 2016, with a win over Albert Ramos Viñolas. He reached his fifteenth final defeating seventh seed Sebastian Ofner and Pavel Kotov and returned to his career-high ranking of No. 22 achieved six years earlier in 2018. He won his fourth title defeating Jack Draper and became the first Frenchman to win three titles in a season since Jo-Wilfried Tsonga (4) and Lucas Pouille (3) in 2017.

=== 2024-25: United Cup debut, top 20, US Open fourth round ===
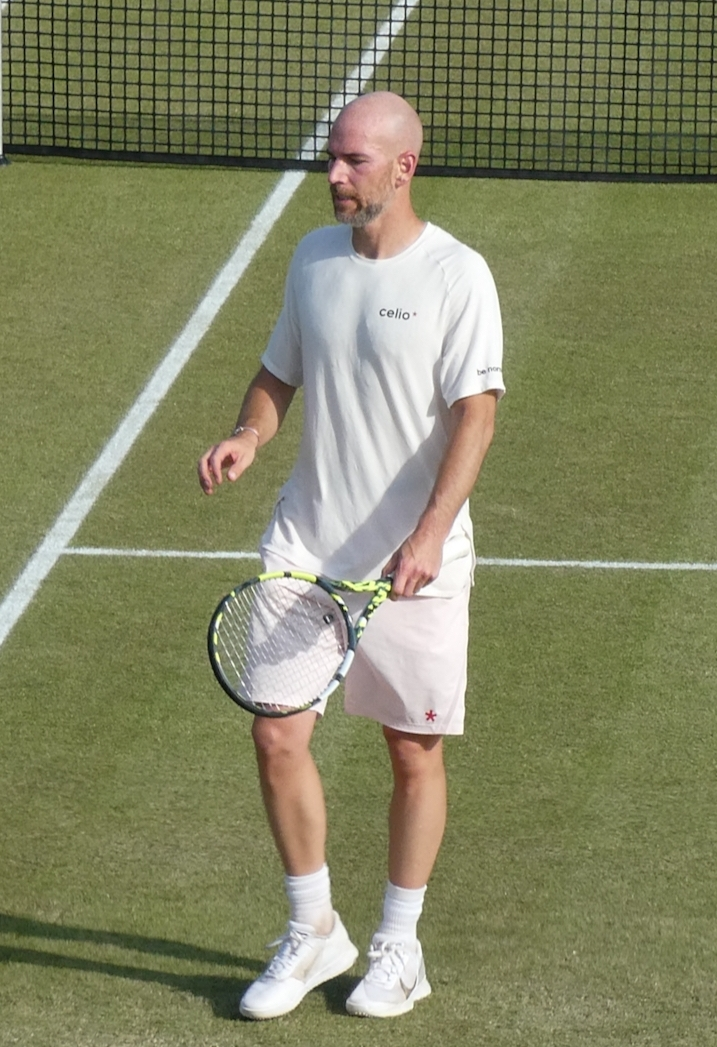
Mannarino at the 2025 Libéma Open

Following reaching the semifinals at the 2024 United Cup as the No. 1 ATP player from team France, Mannarino reached the top 20 in the singles rankings on 8 January 2024.

At the 2024 Australian Open, he reached his second fourth round at this Major defeating 16th seed Ben Shelton, before losing to world No. 1 Novak Djokovic in straight sets. As a result he reached a new career high of world No. 17 in the singles rankings on 29 January 2024.

He defeated James Duckworth to reach the semifinals at the 2024 Dallas Open where he lost to Marcos Giron. Mannarino reached the quarterfinals at the 2024 Chengdu Open with wins over qualifier Térence Atmane and wildcard Zhou Yi, before losing in the last four to top seed Lorenzo Musetti.

In August 2025, Mannarino made the fourth round at the US Open for the first time following the retirement of Ben Shelton in the fifth set.

== Playing style ==
Mannarino is a defensive baseliner and counterpuncher. He is a master at redirecting pace and putting his opponents in uncomfortable positions. He often makes use of his lefthanders' serve to create angles and run his opponents from side to side. His other main strengths are his speed around the court and his consistency from the baseline, but he also actively goes for winners and comes to the net when he sees a chance. Mannarino doesn't possess any dominant weapons, but combines his skills to wear down and outsmart his opponents.

Mannarino is notable on the ATP Tour for playing with rackets strung at the lowest tension on the tour, around 22 lbs.

== Performance timelines ==
Key
W	F	SF	QF	#R	RR	Q#	P#	DNQ	A	Z#	PO	G	S	B	NMS	NTI	P	NH

(W) winner; (F) finalist; (SF) semifinalist; (QF) quarterfinalist; (#R) rounds 4, 3, 2, 1; (RR) round-robin stage; (Q#) qualification round; (P#) preliminary round; (DNQ) did not qualify; (A) absent; (Z#) Davis/Fed Cup Zonal Group (with number indication) or (PO) play-off; (G) gold, (S) silver or (B) bronze Olympic/Paralympic medal; (NMS) not a Masters tournament; (NTI) not a Tier I tournament; (P) postponed; (NH) not held; (SR) strike rate (events won / competed); (W–L) win–loss record.
To avoid confusion and double counting, these charts are updated at the conclusion of a tournament or when the player's participation has ended.

Only main-draw results in ATP Tour, Grand Slam tournaments, Davis Cup/ATP Cup/Laver Cup and Olympic Games are included in win–loss records.

=== Singles ===
Tournament	2007	2008	2009	2010	2011	2012	2013	2014	2015	2016	2017	2018	2019	2020	2021	2022	2023	2024	2025	2026	SR	W–L	Win %
Grand Slam tournaments
Australian Open	A	A	1R	A	2R	1R	1R	2R	2R	1R	1R	3R	1R	1R	3R	4R	2R	4R	1R	1R	0 / 17	14–17	45%
French Open	Q1	1R	1R	Q3	1R	1R	1R	2R	1R	2R	1R	1R	2R	1R	1R	1R	1R	1R	Q1	1R	0 / 17	3–17	15%
Wimbledon	A	Q1	1R	Q3	2R	Q1	4R	2R	2R	2R	4R	4R	1R	NH	1R	2R	2R	1R	3R	2R	0 / 15	18–15	55%
US Open	A	Q2	Q2	2R	1R	Q3	3R	3R	2R	1R	3R	1R	1R	3R	2R	1R	3R	2R	4R	2R	0 / 16	18–16	53%
Win–loss	0–0	0–1	0–3	1–1	2–4	0–2	5–4	5–4	3–4	2–4	5–4	5–4	1–4	2–3	3–4	4–4	4–4	4–4	5–3	2–4	0 / 65	53–65	45%
ATP 1000 tournaments
Indian Wells Open	A	A	A	A	1R	A	A	1R	4R	3R	2R	3R	2R	NH	1R	1R	3R	3R	Q1	1R	0 / 12	11–12	48%
Miami Open	A	A	A	A	1R	A	A	2R	4R	3R	4R	2R	2R	NH	3R	1R	4R	2R	Q1	2R	0 / 12	14–12	54%
Monte-Carlo Masters	A	A	A	A	A	A	Q2	A	1R	1R	3R	1R	1R	NH	1R	Q1	Q1	A	A	1R	0 / 7	2–7	22%
Madrid Open	A	A	A	A	2R	A	A	Q1	1R	Q1	1R	1R	2R	NH	1R	Q1	1R	2R	Q1	1R	0 / 9	2–9	18%
Italian Open	A	A	A	A	1R	A	Q1	Q2	1R	A	1R	1R	A	1R	1R	Q1	1R	2R	Q1	1R	0 / 9	0–9	0%
Canadian Open	A	A	A	A	1R	A	Q2	A	1R	A	QF	1R	3R	NH	A	2R	1R	1R	2R	1R	0 / 10	7–10	41%
Cincinnati Open	A	A	A	A	Q2	A	1R	Q2	1R	1R	3R	2R	3R	1R	A	Q1	QF	1R	4R	1R	0 / 11	11–11	50%
Shanghai Masters	A	A	A	A	A	A	A	A	1R	Q1	1R	1R	Q1	NH			3R	1R	2R	3R	0 / 7	4–7	36%
Paris Masters	A	1R	A	A	2R	A	1R	2R	1R	1R	2R	2R	2R	3R	2R	1R	1R	3R	Q1	Q1	0 / 14	10–14	42%
Win–loss	0–0	0–1	0–0	0–0	2–6	0–0	0–2	2–3	5–9	4–5	12–9	3–9	8–7	2–3	2–6	1–4	9–8	3–8	4–2	3–8	0 / 91	61–91	40%
Career statistics
Tournaments	0	3	4	4	23	7	15	23	30	28	27	29	27	17	25	27	26	28	15	5	Career total: 358		
Titles	0	0	0	0	0	0	0	0	0	0	0	0	1	0	0	1	3	0	0	0	Career total: 5		
Finals	0	0	0	0	0	0	0	0	2	0	2	2	3	1	0	1	4	0	0	1	Career total: 16		
Overall win–loss	0–0	3–3	0–4	2–4	17–23	1–7	10–15	16–23	28–29	26–28	33–27	26–30	27–26	14–17	14–26	28–26	43–24	15–31	13–15	5–5	5 / 358	316–358	47%
Year-end ranking	367	131	180	83	87	188	60	44	47	60	28	42	43	35	71	46	22	66	69		$14,238,654		

== ATP Tour finals ==
=== Singles: 16 (5 titles, 11 runner-ups) ===
Legend Grand Slam (–) ATP 1000 (–) ATP 500 (0–1) ATP 250 (5–10)	Finals by surface Hard (3–8) Clay (–) Grass (2–3)	Finals by setting Outdoor (3–7) Indoor (2–4)

Result	W–L	Date	Tournament	Tier	Surface	Opponent	Score
Loss	0–1	Jan 2015	Auckland Open, New Zealand	ATP 250	Hard	(Czech Republic) Jiří Veselý	3–6, 2–6
Loss	0–2	Jul 2015	Colombia Open, Colombia	ATP 250	Hard	(Australia) Bernard Tomic	1–6, 6–3, 2–6
Loss	0–3	Jul 2017	Antalya Open, Turkey	ATP 250	Grass	(Japan) Yūichi Sugita	1–6, 6–7^{(4–7)}
Loss	0–4	Oct 2017	Japan Open, Japan	ATP 500	Hard	(Belgium) David Goffin	3–6, 5–7
Loss	0–5	Jun 2018	Antalya Open, Turkey	ATP 250	Grass	(Bosnia and Herzegovina) Damir Džumhur	1–6, 6–1, 1–6
Loss	0–6	Oct 2018	Kremlin Cup, Russia	ATP 250	Hard (i)	(Russia) Karen Khachanov	2–6, 2–6
Win	1–6	Jun 2019	Rosmalen Championships, Netherlands	ATP 250	Grass	(Australia) Jordan Thompson	7–6^{(9–7)}, 6–3
Loss	1–7	Sep 2019	Zhuhai Championships, China	ATP 250	Hard	(Australia) Alex de Minaur	6–7^{(4–7)}, 4–6
Loss	1–8	Oct 2019	Kremlin Cup, Russia	ATP 250	Hard (i)	(Russia) Andrey Rublev	4–6, 0–6
Loss	1–9	Nov 2020	Astana Open, Kazakhstan	ATP 250	Hard (i)	(Australia) John Millman	5–7, 1–6
Win	2–9	Aug 2022	Winston-Salem Open, United States	ATP 250	Hard	(Serbia) Laslo Djere	7–6^{(7–1)}, 6–4
Loss	2–10	Jun 2023	Mallorca Open, Spain	ATP 250	Grass	(United States) Christopher Eubanks	1–6, 4–6
Win	3–10	Jul 2023	Hall of Fame Open, United States	ATP 250	Grass	(United States) Alex Michelsen	6–2, 6–4
Win	4–10	Sep 2023	Astana Open, Kazakhstan	ATP 250	Hard (i)	(United States) Sebastian Korda	4–6, 6–3, 6–2
Win	5–10	Nov 2023	Sofia Open, Bulgaria	ATP 250	Hard (i)	(United Kingdom) Jack Draper	7–6^{(8–6)}, 2–6, 6–3
Loss	5–11	Feb 2026	Open Occitanie, France	ATP 250	Hard (i)	(Canada) Félix Auger-Aliassime	3–6, 6–7^{(4–7)}

=== Doubles: 1 (runner-up) ===
Legend Grand Slam (–) ATP 1000 (–) ATP 500 (0–1) ATP 250 (–)	Finals by surface Hard (0–1) Clay (–) Grass (–)	Finals by setting Outdoor (–) Indoor (0–1)

Result	W–L	Date	Tournament	Tier	Surface	Partner	Opponents	Score
Loss	0–1	Oct 2022	Astana Open, Kazakhstan	ATP 500	Hard (i)	(France) Fabrice Martin	(Croatia) Nikola Mektić (Croatia) Mate Pavić	4–6, 2–6

== ATP Challenger and ITF Tour finals ==
=== Singles: 33 (20 titles, 13 runner–ups) ===
Legend ATP Challenger Tour (14–8) ITF Futures (6–5)	Finals by surface Hard (19–11) Clay (1–1) Grass (0–1)

Result	W–L	Date	Tournament	Tier	Surface	Opponent	Score
Loss	0–1	Oct 2008	Open de Rennes, France	Challenger	Hard (i)	(France) Josselin Ouanna	2–6, 3–6
Win	1–1	Nov 2008	Caversham International, UK	Challenger	Hard (i)	(Germany) Andreas Beck	7–6^{(7–4)}, 7–6^{(7–4)}
Loss	1–2	Apr 2009	Open Prévadiès, France	Challenger	Clay (i)	(France) Josselin Ouanna	5–7, 6–1, 4–6
Loss	1–3	Aug 2009	Open Castilla y León, Spain	Challenger	Hard	(Spain) Feliciano López	3–6, 4–6
Loss	1–4	Jul 2010	Guzzini Challenger, Italy	Challenger	Hard	(Switzerland) Stéphane Bohli	0–6, 6–3, 6–7^{(5–7)}
Loss	1–5	Aug 2010	Segovia Challenger, Spain	Challenger	Hard	(Spain) Daniel Gimeno Traver	4–6, 6–7^{(2–7)}
Win	2–5	Aug 2010	TED Open, Turkey	Challenger	Hard	(Kazakhstan) Mikhail Kukushkin	6–4, 3–6, 6–3
Win	3–5	Oct 2010	Ethias Trophy, Belgium	Challenger	Hard (i)	(Belgium) Steve Darcis	7–5, 6–4
Loss	3–6	Sep 2012	Istanbul Open, Turkey	Challenger	Hard	(Russia) Dmitry Tursunov	4–6, 6–7^{(5–7)}
Win	4–6	Jan 2013	Open Nouvelle-Calédonie, France	Challenger	Hard	(Slovakia) Andrej Martin	6–4, 6–3
Win	5–6	Mar 2013	BH Telecom Indoors, Bosnia and Herzegovina	Challenger	Hard (i)	(Germany) Dustin Brown	7–6^{(7–3)}, 7–6^{(7–2)}
Loss	5–7	Apr 2013	Mexico Challenger, Mexico	Challenger	Hard	(Slovakia) Andrej Martin	6–4, 4–6, 1–6
Win	6–7	Jul 2014	Manta Open, Ecuador	Challenger	Hard	(Argentina) Guido Andreozzi	4–6, 6–3, 6–2
Win	7–7	Jul 2014	Open Castilla y León, Spain	Challenger	Hard	(Spain) Adrián Menéndez Maceiras	6–3, 6–0
Win	8–7	Sep 2014	Istanbul Open, Turkey (2)	Challenger	Hard	(Japan) Tatsuma Ito	6–0, 2–0 ret.
Win	9–7	Nov 2014	Knoxville Challenger, US	Challenger	Hard (i)	(Australia) Sam Groth	3–6, 7–6^{(8–6)}, 6–4
Win	10–7	Nov 2014	Champaign Challenger, US	Challenger	Hard (i)	(Denmark) Frederik Nielsen	6–2, 6–2
Win	11–7	Jan 2016	Open Nouvelle-Calédonie, France (2)	Challenger	Hard	(Colombia) Alejandro Falla	5–7, 6–2, 6–2
Win	12–7	Jan 2017	Open Nouvelle-Calédonie, France (3)	Challenger	Hard	(Serbia) Nikola Milojević	6–3, 7–5
Win	13–7	Feb 2017	Open Quimper Bretagne, France	Challenger	Hard (i)	(Germany) Peter Gojowczyk	6–4, 6–4
Win	14–7	Mar 2020	Monterrey Challenger, Mexico	Challenger	Hard	(Australia) Aleksandar Vukic	6–1, 6–3
Loss	14–8	Jul 2025	Hall of Fame Open, United States	Challenger	Grass	(United States) Zachary Svajda	5–7, 3–6
Win	1–0	Apr 2006	F11 Melilla, Spain	Futures	Hard	(Togo) Komlavi Loglo	6–2, 6–3
Win	2–0	Jun 2006	F20 Santa Cruz de Tenerife, Spain	Futures	Hard	(Spain) Albert Ramos Viñolas	6–2, 6–0
Loss	2–1	Oct 2006	F19 Rodez, France	Futures	Hard (i)	(Russia) Andrey Golubev	6–4, 1–6, 0–6
Loss	2–2	Sep 2007	F14 Plaisir, France	Futures	Hard (i)	(France) Thomas Oger	6–7^{(3–7)}, 5–7
Loss	2–3	Oct 2007	F18 La Roche-sur-Yon, France	Futures	Hard	(Czech Republic) Lukáš Rosol	3–6, 6–3, 4–6
Win	3–3	Oct 2007	F19 Rodez, France	Futures	Hard (i)	(France) Baptiste Dupuy	6–1, 6–2
Win	4–3	Nov 2007	F22 Sunderland, UK	Futures	Hard (i)	(United Kingdom) Ken Skupski	6–4, 6–3
Loss	4–4	Jan 2008	F1 Sunderland, UK	Futures	Hard (i)	(United Kingdom) Richard Bloomfield	4–6, 3–6
Win	5–4	Jan 2008	F2 Sheffield, UK	Futures	Hard (i)	(Finland) Timo Nieminen	3–6, 7–6^{(8–6)}, 6–2
Loss	5–5	Mar 2008	F4 Lille, France	Futures	Hard (i)	(France) Clément Reix	6–2, 6–7^{(3–7)}, 5–7
Win	6–5	Sep 2008	F15 Plaisir, France	Futures	Hard (i)	(France) Jean-Christophe Faurel	4–6, 6–4, 6–2

=== Doubles: 5 (4 titles, 1 runner–up) ===
Legend ATP Challenger Tour (0–1) ITF Futures (4–0)	Finals by surface Hard (2–1) Clay (2–0)

Result	W–L	Date	Tournament	Tier	Surface	Partner	Opponents	Score
Win	1–0	Jan 2007	Feucherolles, France	Futures	Hard	(France) Josselin Ouanna	(France) Ludwig Pellerin (France) Édouard Roger-Vasselin	6–4, 7–5
Win	2–0	Feb 2007	Bressuire, France	Futures	Hard	(France) Josselin Ouanna	(Pakistan) Aisam-ul-Haq Qureshi (France) Alexandre Renard	6–7^{(5–7)}, 6–3, 7–5
Win	3–0	Jun 2007	Blois, France	Futures	Clay	(France) Josselin Ouanna	(Spain) David Marrero (Spain) Daniel Muñoz de la Nava	6–2, 6–1
Win	4–0	Jul 2007	Saint-Gervais-les-Bains, France	Futures	Clay	(France) Jonathan Eysseric	(Ukraine) Ivan Sergeyev (Portugal) Leonardo Tavares	6–1, 6–4
Loss	0–1	Aug 2012	Pozoblanco, Spain	Challenger	Hard	(France) Maxime Teixeira	(Russia) Konstantin Kravchuk (Ukraine) Denys Molchanov	3–6, 3–6

== Wins against top-10 players ==
- Mannarino has a 12–65 record against players who were, at the time the match was played, ranked in the top 10.

Season	2015	2016	2017	2018	2019	2020	2021	2022	2023	2024	2025	2026	Total
Wins	1	0	3	0	1	0	2	0	3	0	1	1	12

#	Player	Rank	Event	Surface	Rd	Score	AMR
2015
1.	(Switzerland) Stan Wawrinka	8	Miami Open, United States	Hard	3R	7–6^{(7–4)}, 7–6^{(7–5)}	32
2017
2.	(France) Jo-Wilfried Tsonga	10	Monte Carlo Masters, Monaco	Clay	2R	6–7^{(3–7)}, 6–2, 6–3	56
3.	(Canada) Milos Raonic	10	Canadian Open, Canada	Hard	2R	6–4, 6–4	42
4.	(Croatia) Marin Čilić	5	Japan Open, Japan	Hard	SF	6–7^{(5–7)}, 6–4, 6–0	31
2019
5.	(Greece) Stefanos Tsitsipas	7	Zhuhai Championships, China	Hard	2R	3–6, 7–5 ret.	61
2021
6.	(Austria) Dominic Thiem	5	Mallorca Open, Spain	Grass	2R	2–5 ret.	42
7.	(Russia) Andrey Rublev	6	Kremlin Cup, Russia	Hard (i)	2R	5–7, 7–6^{(7–4)}, 6–3	51
2023
8.	(Poland) Hubert Hurkacz	9	Miami Open, United States	Hard	3R	7–6^{(7–5)}, 7–6^{(7–0)}	62
9.	Daniil Medvedev	3	Rosmalen Grass Court Championships, Netherlands	Grass	2R	4–6, 6–4, 6–2	52
10.	(United States) Taylor Fritz	8	Queen's Club Championships, United Kingdom	Grass	2R	6–4, 7–6^{(9–7)}	46
2025
11.	(United States) Ben Shelton	6	US Open, United States	Hard	3R	3–6, 6–3, 4–6, 6–4 ret.	77
2026
12.	(Italy) Flavio Cobolli	7	Shanghai Masters, China	Hard	2R	6–1, 4–6, 6–3	83
