= 2022 Orlando Open – Doubles =

Doubles
- 2022 Orlando Open

Final
- Champions: (South Korea) Chung Yun-seong (Greece) Michail Pervolarakis
- Runners-up: (Tunisia) Malek Jaziri (Japan) Kaichi Uchida
- Score: 6–7^{(5–7)}, 7–6^{(7–3)}, [16–14]

Events
Singles	Doubles
← 2021 ·	Orlando Open	· 2023 →

Christian Harrison and Peter Polansky were the defending champions but only Harrison chose to defend his title, partnering Andrew Harris. Harrison lost in the semifinals to Chung Yun-seong and Michail Pervolarakis.

Chung and Pervolarakis won the title after defeating Malek Jaziri and Kaichi Uchida 6–7^{(5–7)}, 7–6^{(7–3)}, [16–14] in the final.

== Seeds ==
1. (United States) Robert Galloway / (United States) Jackson Withrow (quarterfinals)
2. (United States) JC Aragone / (United States) Max Schnur (first round)
3. (Philippines) Ruben Gonzales / (United States) Reese Stalder (quarterfinals)
4. (Colombia) Nicolás Mejía / (Ecuador) Roberto Quiroz (first round, withdrew)

== Draw ==
=== Key ===
- Q = Qualifier
- WC = Wild card
- LL = Lucky loser
- Alt = Alternate
- SE = Special exempt
- PR = Protected ranking
- ITF = ITF entry
- JE = Junior exempt
- w/o = Walkover
- r = Retired
- d = Defaulted
- SR = Special ranking

First round
1	(United States) R Galloway (United States) J Withrow	6	6
(Bolivia) B Arias (South Africa) R Roelofse	2	3
(Turkey) E Kırkın (Kazakhstan) D Yevseyev	3	4
WC	(United States) B Shelton (United States) K Smith	6	6
3	(Philippines) R Gonzales (United States) R Stalder	6	6
(United States) Jack Vance (United States) Tennyson Whiting	2	1
Alt	(Tunisia) M Jaziri (Japan) K Uchida	6	6
(Peru) N Álvarez (Argentina) G Villanueva	1	3
PR	(China) Y Wu (China) Zh Zhang	6	6
(United States) B Fratangelo (Ecuador) E Gómez	3	4
PR	(Australia) A Harris (United States) C Harrison	w/o
4	(Colombia) N Mejía (Ecuador) R Quiroz
(Germany) S Fanselow (Australia) D Sweeny	2	4
WC	(United States) B Holt (United States) Z Svajda	6	6
(South Korea) Y-s Chung (Greece) M Pervolarakis	6	6
2	(United States) JC Aragone (United States) M Schnur	4	4

Quarterfinals
1	(United States) R Galloway (United States) J Withrow	6^{7}	6	[7]
WC	(United States) B Shelton (United States) K Smith	7^{9}	3	[10]
3	(Philippines) R Gonzales (United States) R Stalder	6^{4}	5
Alt	(Tunisia) M Jaziri (Japan) K Uchida	7^{7}	7
PR	(China) Y Wu (China) Zh Zhang	6^{6}	3
PR	(Australia) A Harris (United States) C Harrison	7^{8}	6
WC	(United States) B Holt (United States) Z Svajda	6	5	[7]
(South Korea) Y-s Chung (Greece) M Pervolarakis	2	7	[10]

Semifinals
WC	(United States) B Shelton (United States) K Smith	6	3	[4]
Alt	(Tunisia) M Jaziri (Japan) K Uchida	3	6	[10]
PR	(Australia) A Harris (United States) C Harrison	6	4	[7]
(South Korea) Y-s Chung (Greece) M Pervolarakis	3	6	[10]

Final
Alt	(Tunisia) M Jaziri (Japan) K Uchida	7^{7}	6^{3}	[14]
(South Korea) Y-s Chung (Greece) M Pervolarakis	6^{5}	7^{7}	[16]
