= 2020 Orlando Open – Doubles =

Doubles
- 2020 Orlando Open

Final
- Champions: (Kazakhstan) Andrey Golubev (Kazakhstan) Aleksandr Nedovyesov
- Runners-up: (United States) Mitchell Krueger (United States) Jackson Withrow
- Score: 7–5, 6–4

Events
Singles	Doubles
← 2019 ·	Orlando Open	· 2021 →

Romain Arneodo and Andrei Vasilevski were the defending champions but chose not to defend their title.

Andrey Golubev and Aleksandr Nedovyesov won the title after defeating Mitchell Krueger and Jackson Withrow 7–5, 6–4 in the final.

== Seeds ==
1. (Mexico) Hans Hach Verdugo / (Mexico) Miguel Ángel Reyes-Varela (semifinals)
2. (Kazakhstan) Andrey Golubev / (Kazakhstan) Aleksandr Nedovyesov (champions)
3. (United States) Robert Galloway / (United States) Nathaniel Lammons (first round)
4. (United States) Hunter Reese / (Netherlands) Sem Verbeek (first round)

== Draw ==
=== Key ===
- Q = Qualifier
- WC = Wild card
- LL = Lucky loser
- Alt = Alternate
- SE = Special exempt
- PR = Protected ranking
- ITF = ITF entry
- JE = Junior exempt
- w/o = Walkover
- r = Retired
- d = Defaulted
- SR = Special ranking

First round
1	(Mexico) H Hach Verdugo (Mexico) MÁ Reyes-Varela	5	7^{8}	[10]
WC	(United States) B Fratangelo (United States) P Kypson	7	6^{6}	[6]
Alt	(Chinese Taipei) C-h Tseng (Chinese Taipei) T-l Wu	w/o
(United States) T-S Kwiatkowski (United States) A Ritschard
3	(United States) R Galloway (United States) N Lammons	7^{7}	2	[6]
(United States) M Krueger (United States) J Withrow	6^{1}	6	[10]
(Philippines) T Huey (United States) Ma Redlicki	w/o
(Tunisia) A Dougaz (Egypt) M Safwat
(Colombia) DE Galán (United States) C Harrison	7^{7}	4	[10]
WC	(United States) B Holt (United States) K Smith	6^{5}	6	[5]
(France) S Doumbia (France) F Reboul	6	4	[10]
4	(United States) H Reese (Netherlands) S Verbeek	4	6	[7]
(Canada) P Polansky (Kazakhstan) D Popko	3	6	[10]
(United States) C Eubanks (United States) B Nakashima	6	2	[6]
(Russia) T Gabashvili (United States) D Novikov	7^{7}	2	[5]
2	(Kazakhstan) A Golubev (Kazakhstan) A Nedovyesov	6^{4}	6	[10]

Quarterfinals
1	(Mexico) H Hach Verdugo (Mexico) MÁ Reyes-Varela	6	6
Alt	(Chinese Taipei) C-h Tseng (Chinese Taipei) T-l Wu	3	4
(United States) M Krueger (United States) J Withrow	6	6
(Philippines) T Huey (United States) Ma Redlicki	3	2
(Colombia) DE Galán (United States) C Harrison	4	4
(France) S Doumbia (France) F Reboul	6	6
(Canada) P Polansky (Kazakhstan) D Popko	6	4	[5]
2	(Kazakhstan) A Golubev (Kazakhstan) A Nedovyesov	2	6	[10]

Semifinals
1	(Mexico) H Hach Verdugo (Mexico) MÁ Reyes-Varela	6	1	[8]
(United States) M Krueger (United States) J Withrow	0	6	[10]
(France) S Doumbia (France) F Reboul	3	5
2	(Kazakhstan) A Golubev (Kazakhstan) A Nedovyesov	6	7

Final
(United States) M Krueger (United States) J Withrow	5	4
2	(Kazakhstan) A Golubev (Kazakhstan) A Nedovyesov	7	6
