= 2022 Orlando Open – Singles =

Singles
- 2022 Orlando Open

Final
- Champion: (China) Wu Yibing
- Runner-up: (Australia) Jason Kubler
- Score: 6–7^{(5–7)}, 6–4, 3–1 ret.

Events
Singles	Doubles
← 2021 ·	Orlando Open	· 2023 →

Christopher Eubanks was the defending champion but lost in the quarterfinals to Wu Yibing.

Wu won the title after Jason Kubler retired in the middle of the third set with the score 6–7^{(5–7)}, 6–4, 3–1 in favor of Wu.

== Seeds ==
1. (United States) J. J. Wolf (semifinals)
2. (Ecuador) Emilio Gómez (semifinals)
3. (United States) Christopher Eubanks (quarterfinals)
4. (Australia) Jason Kubler (final, retired)
5. (United States) Michael Mmoh (first round)
6. (Turkey) Altuğ Çelikbilek (first round)
7. (United States) Bjorn Fratangelo (first round)
8. (Australia) Rinky Hijikata (second round)

== Draw ==
=== Key ===
- Q = Qualifier
- WC = Wild card
- LL = Lucky loser
- Alt = Alternate
- SE = Special exempt
- PR = Protected ranking
- ITF = ITF entry
- JE = Junior exempt
- w/o = Walkover
- r = Retired
- d = Defaulted
- SR = Special ranking

=== Finals ===
Semifinals
1	(United States) J. J. Wolf	1	3
4	(Australia) Jason Kubler	6	6
PR	(China) Wu Yibing	6	6
2	(Ecuador) Emilio Gómez	4	1

Final
4	(Australia) Jason Kubler	7^{7}	4	1^{r}
PR	(China) Wu Yibing	6^{5}	6	3

=== Top half ===
First round
1	(United States) J. J. Wolf	6	6
Q	(United States) M Damm	3	1
WC	(United States) B Holt	6	6
(Turkey) E Kırkın	2	3
(Japan) Y Uchiyama	1	6	6
Alt	(Kazakhstan) D Yevseyev	6	3	2
(Chinese Taipei) T-l Wu	6	7^{7}
7	(United States) B Fratangelo	4	6^{5}
4	(Australia) J Kubler	6	6
Q	(United States) K Smith	2	2
(Germany) S Fanselow	2	6^{5}
(Colombia) N Mejía	6	7^{7}
Q	(Brazil) Gilbert Klier Júnior	6^{5}	4
(United States) U Blanch	7^{7}	6
WC	(United States) B Shelton	3	6^{8}
8	(Australia) R Hijikata	6	7^{10}

Second round
1	(United States) J. J. Wolf	7	3	6
WC	(United States) B Holt	5	6	3
(Japan) Y Uchiyama	6	6^{3}	1
(Chinese Taipei) T-l Wu	4	7^{7}	6
4	(Australia) J Kubler	6	6
(Colombia) N Mejía	2	1
(United States) U Blanch	6	3	6
8	(Australia) R Hijikata	0	6	3

Quarterfinals
1	(United States) J. J. Wolf	4	6	6
(Chinese Taipei) T-l Wu	6	3	2
4	(Australia) J Kubler	6	3	6
(United States) U Blanch	3	6	1

Semifinals
1	(United States) J. J. Wolf	1	3
4	(Australia) J Kubler	6	6

=== Bottom half ===
First round
6	(Turkey) A Çelikbilek	2	2
PR	(China) Y Wu	6	6
(United States) C Harrison	6	6
(Argentina) G Villanueva	4	2
(Japan) K Uchida	7	4	3
Q	(Bulgaria) A Andreev	5	6	6
WC	(United States) A Kovacevic	6^{1}	6	6^{4}
3	(United States) C Eubanks	7^{7}	1	7^{7}
5	(United States) M Mmoh	5	3
Alt	(Ecuador) R Quiroz	7	6
Q	(Greece) M Pervolarakis	6	1	4
Q	(Croatia) M Pecotić	3	6	6
(Japan) H Moriya	2	2
Alt	(Tunisia) M Jaziri	6	6
(China) Zh Zhang	4	4
2	(Ecuador) E Gómez	6	6

Second round
PR	(China) Y Wu	7^{7}	6
(United States) C Harrison	6^{2}	0
Q	(Bulgaria) A Andreev	4	7	2
3	(United States) C Eubanks	6	5	6
Alt	(Ecuador) R Quiroz	7	7^{8}
Q	(Croatia) M Pecotić	5	6^{6}
Alt	(Tunisia) M Jaziri	6^{4}	2
2	(Ecuador) E Gómez	7^{7}	6

Quarterfinals
PR	(China) Y Wu	6	7^{8}
3	(United States) C Eubanks	4	6^{6}
Alt	(Ecuador) R Quiroz	2	1^{r}
2	(Ecuador) E Gómez	6	3

Semifinals
PR	(China) Y Wu	6	6
2	(Ecuador) E Gómez	4	1
