= 2020 Orlando Open =

- Date: 16–22 November
- Edition: 2nd
- Draw: 32S / 16Q / 16D
- Surface: Hard
- Location: Orlando, Florida, United States

Champions

Singles
- (United States) Brandon Nakashima

Doubles
- (Kazakhstan) Andrey Golubev / (Kazakhstan) Aleksandr Nedovyesov
← 2019 ·	Orlando Open	· 2021 →

The 2020 Orlando Open was a professional tennis tournament played on hard courts. It was the second edition of the tournament which was part of the 2020 ATP Challenger Tour. It took place in Orlando, Florida, United States between 16 and 22 November 2020.

== Singles main-draw entrants ==
=== Seeds ===
Country	Player	Rank^{1}	Seed
BRA	Thiago Monteiro	84	1
USA	Denis Kudla	124	2
COL	Daniel Elahi Galán	133	3
IND	Prajnesh Gunneswaran	146	4
EGY	Mohamed Safwat	156	5
KAZ	Dmitry Popko	174	6
IND	Ramkumar Ramanathan	185	7
USA	Mackenzie McDonald	193	8

- ^{1} Rankings are as of 9 November 2020.

=== Other entrants ===
The following players received wildcards into the singles main draw:

- (United States) Brandon Holt
- (United States) Patrick Kypson
- (United States) ~~Sam Riffice~~

The following players received entry from the qualifying draw:

- (United States) Christian Harrison
- (United States) Stefan Kozlov
- (United States) Alexander Ritschard
- (United States) Zachary Svajda

The following players received entry as lucky losers:

- (United States) Nick Chappell
- (France) Sadio Doumbia
- (United States) Kevin King

== Champions ==
=== Singles ===
- (United States) Brandon Nakashima def. (India) Prajnesh Gunneswaran 6–3, 6–4.

=== Doubles ===
- (Kazakhstan) Andrey Golubev / (Kazakhstan) Aleksandr Nedovyesov def. (United States) Mitchell Krueger / (United States) Jackson Withrow 7–5, 6–4.
