= 2020 Orlando Open – Singles =

Singles
- 2020 Orlando Open

Final
- Champion: (United States) Brandon Nakashima
- Runner-up: (India) Prajnesh Gunneswaran
- Score: 6–3, 6–4

Events
Singles	Doubles
← 2019 ·	Orlando Open	· 2021 →

Marcos Giron was the defending champion but chose not to defend his title.

Brandon Nakashima won the title after defeating Prajnesh Gunneswaran 6–3, 6–4 in the final.

== Seeds ==
1. (Brazil) Thiago Monteiro (second round)
2. (United States) Denis Kudla (quarterfinals)
3. (Colombia) Daniel Elahi Galán (first round)
4. (India) Prajnesh Gunneswaran (final)
5. (Egypt) Mohamed Safwat (first round)
6. (Kazakhstan) Dmitry Popko (quarterfinals)
7. (India) Ramkumar Ramanathan (first round)
8. (United States) Mackenzie McDonald (quarterfinals)

== Draw ==
=== Key ===
- Q = Qualifier
- WC = Wild card
- LL = Lucky loser
- Alt = Alternate
- SE = Special exempt
- PR = Protected ranking
- ITF = ITF entry
- JE = Junior exempt
- w/o = Walkover
- r = Retired
- d = Defaulted
- SR = Special ranking

=== Finals ===
Semifinals
(United States) Brandon Nakashima	6	6
(United States) Mitchell Krueger	1	3
4	(India) Prajnesh Gunneswaran	6	7^{7}
(United States) Christopher Eubanks	4	6^{2}

Final
(United States) Brandon Nakashima	6	6
4	(India) Prajnesh Gunneswaran	3	4

=== Top half ===
First round
1	(Brazil) T Monteiro	6	6
Q	(United States) S Kozlov	1	3
(Dominican Republic) R Cid Subervi	1	3
(United States) B Nakashima	6	6
(Sweden) E Ymer	7	7^{7}
(Chinese Taipei) C-h Tseng	5	6^{3}
(Russia) T Gabashvili	2	1
8	(United States) M McDonald	6	6
3	(Colombia) DE Galán	3	3
(United States) B Fratangelo	6	6
(United States) M Krueger	6	6
(Canada) P Polansky	4	4
(United States) U Blanch	4	3
Q	(United States) A Ritschard	6	6
LL	(United States) N Chappell	6	6
7	(India) R Ramanathan	3	4

Second round
1	(Brazil) T Monteiro	4	3
(United States) B Nakashima	6	6
(Sweden) E Ymer	3	3
8	(United States) M McDonald	6	6
(United States) B Fratangelo	6	2	2
(United States) M Krueger	3	6	6
Q	(United States) A Ritschard	6	6
LL	(United States) N Chappell	3	4

Quarterfinals
(United States) B Nakashima	6	7^{10}
8	(United States) M McDonald	3	6^{8}
(United States) M Krueger	6	6^{5}	6
Q	(United States) A Ritschard	4	7^{7}	1

Semifinals
(United States) B Nakashima	6	6
(United States) M Krueger	1	3

=== Bottom half ===
First round
6	(Kazakhstan) D Popko	6	6
(United States) N Rubin	1	2
WC	(United States) B Holt	5	3
Q	(United States) Z Svajda	7	6
(Brazil) T Bellucci	2	2
(Chinese Taipei) T-l Wu	6	6
LL	(France) S Doumbia	3	5
4	(India) P Gunneswaran	6	7
5	(Egypt) M Safwat	1	1
(Japan) H Moriya	6	6
(United States) T-S Kwiatkowski	7^{7}	3	1
(United States) C Eubanks	6^{1}	6	6
Q	(United States) C Harrison	3	6^{8}
WC	(United States) P Kypson	6	7^{10}
LL	(United States) K King	4	3
2	(United States) D Kudla	6	6

Second round
6	(Kazakhstan) D Popko	7	1	7
Q	(United States) Z Svajda	5	6	5
(Chinese Taipei) T-l Wu	7	5	0^{r}
4	(India) P Gunneswaran	5	7	2
(Japan) H Moriya	2	1
(United States) C Eubanks	6	6
WC	(United States) P Kypson	4	4
2	(United States) D Kudla	6	6

Quarterfinals
6	(Kazakhstan) D Popko	0	3
4	(India) P Gunneswaran	6	6
(United States) C Eubanks	5	7^{7}	6
2	(United States) D Kudla	7	6^{3}	3

Semifinals
4	(India) P Gunneswaran	6	7^{7}
(United States) C Eubanks	4	6^{2}
