= 2021 Orlando Open – Singles =

Singles
- 2021 Orlando Open

Final
- Champion: (United States) Jenson Brooksby
- Runner-up: (United States) Denis Kudla
- Score: 6–3, 6–3

Events
Singles	Doubles
← 2020 ·	Orlando Open	· 2021 →

Brandon Nakashima was the defending champion but chose not to defend his title.

Jenson Brooksby won the title after defeating Denis Kudla 6–3, 6–3 in the final.

== Seeds ==
1. (United States) Steve Johnson (first round)
2. (Japan) Yasutaka Uchiyama (second round)
3. (United States) Mackenzie McDonald (first round)
4. (Brazil) Thiago Seyboth Wild (second round)
5. (United States) Denis Kudla (final)
6. (India) Prajnesh Gunneswaran (second round)
7. (Chinese Taipei) Jason Jung (first round)
8. (Chile) Alejandro Tabilo (first round)

== Draw ==
=== Key ===
- Q = Qualifier
- WC = Wild card
- LL = Lucky loser
- Alt = Alternate
- SE = Special exempt
- PR = Protected ranking
- ITF = ITF entry
- JE = Junior exempt
- w/o = Walkover
- r = Retired
- d = Defaulted
- SR = Special ranking

=== Finals ===
Semifinals
5	(United States) Denis Kudla	2	6	6
(Dominican Republic) Roberto Cid Subervi	6	2	2
WC	(United States) Christian Harrison	5	1
(United States) Jenson Brooksby	7	6

Final
5	(United States) Denis Kudla	3	3
(United States) Jenson Brooksby	6	6

=== Top half ===
First round
1	(United States) S Johnson	1	6^{3}
(United States) C Eubanks	6	7^{7}
(United States) M Mmoh	6	4	6
Q	(United States) M Damm	4	6	1
(United States) M Krueger	3	4
Q	(Netherlands) T van Rijthoven	6	6
(Brazil) J Menezes	2	2
5	(United States) D Kudla	6	6
4	(Brazil) T Seyboth Wild	6	6
(Argentina) F Mena	2	0
(Denmark) M Torpegaard	6^{2}	3
(Dominican Republic) R Cid Subervi	7^{7}	6
(Ecuador) E Gómez	6	4	1
(United States) B Fratangelo	3	6	6
(Canada) B Schnur	6	6
8	(Chile) A Tabilo	2	2

Second round
(United States) C Eubanks	6	3	2
(United States) M Mmoh	3	6	6
Q	(Netherlands) T van Rijthoven	7	2	5
5	(United States) D Kudla	5	6	7
4	(Brazil) T Seyboth Wild	6^{2}	2
(Dominican Republic) R Cid Subervi	7^{7}	6
(United States) B Fratangelo	3	6^{2}
(Canada) B Schnur	6	7^{7}

Quarterfinals
(United States) M Mmoh	5	3
5	(United States) D Kudla	7	6
(Dominican Republic) R Cid Subervi	3	6	4
(Canada) B Schnur	6	2	0^{r}

Semifinals
5	(United States) D Kudla	2	6	6
(Dominican Republic) R Cid Subervi	6	2	2

=== Bottom half ===
First round
6	(India) P Gunneswaran	6	6
(Australia) M Ebden	4	1
(Japan) Yo Watanuki	1	1
(United States) J Sock	6	6
WC	(United States) A Kovacevic	6	5	6
Q	(Ecuador) R Quiroz	1	7	4
WC	(United States) C Harrison	7	6
3	(United States) M McDonald	5	3
7	(Chinese Taipei) J Jung	1	4
(United States) J Brooksby	6	6
(United States) T-S Kwiatkowski	2	3
Q	(Turkey) A Çelikbilek	6	6
WC	(United States) Z Khan	6	1	6
LL	(United States) K King	3	6	1
(Canada) P Polansky	3	6	4
2	(Japan) Y Uchiyama	6	3	6

Second round
6	(India) P Gunneswaran	3	4
(United States) J Sock	6	6
WC	(United States) A Kovacevic	4	3
WC	(United States) C Harrison	6	6
(United States) J Brooksby	6	6
Q	(Turkey) A Çelikbilek	3	1
WC	(United States) Z Khan	7^{7}	7^{7}
2	(Japan) Y Uchiyama	6^{5}	6^{5}

Quarterfinals
(United States) J Sock	6^{3}	3
WC	(United States) C Harrison	7^{7}	6
(United States) J Brooksby	6	6
WC	(United States) Z Khan	4	3

Semifinals
WC	(United States) C Harrison	5	1
(United States) J Brooksby	7	6
