= 2021 Orlando Open =

- Date: 12–18 April
- Edition: 3rd
- Surface: Hard
- Location: Orlando, United States

Champions

Singles
- (United States) Jenson Brooksby

Doubles
- (United States) Mitchell Krueger / (United States) Jack Sock
← 2020 ·	Orlando Open	· 2021 →

The 2021 Orlando Open was a professional tennis tournament played on hard courts. It was the third edition of the tournament which was part of the 2021 ATP Challenger Tour. It took place in Orlando, United States between 12 and 18 April 2021.

== Singles main-draw entrants ==
=== Seeds ===
Country	Player	Rank^{1}	Seed
USA	Steve Johnson	83	1
JPN	Yasutaka Uchiyama	111	2
USA	Mackenzie McDonald	119	3
BRA	Thiago Seyboth Wild	122	4
USA	Denis Kudla	123	5
IND	Prajnesh Gunneswaran	139	6
TPE	Jason Jung	148	7
CHI	Alejandro Tabilo	163	8

- ^{1} Rankings are as of 5 April 2021.

=== Other entrants ===
The following players received wildcards into the singles main draw:

- (United States) Christian Harrison
- (United States) Zane Khan
- (United States) Aleksandar Kovacevic

The following players received entry from the qualifying draw:

- (Turkey) Altuğ Çelikbilek
- (United States) Martin Damm
- (Ecuador) Roberto Quiroz
- (Netherlands) Tim van Rijthoven

The following player received entry as a lucky loser:

- (United States) Kevin King

== Champions ==
=== Singles ===
- (United States) Jenson Brooksby def. (United States) Denis Kudla 6–3, 6–3.

=== Doubles ===
- (United States) Mitchell Krueger / (United States) Jack Sock def. (United States) Christian Harrison / (United States) Dennis Novikov 4–6, 7–5, [13–11].
