= 2021 Orlando Open II – Singles =

Singles
- 2021 Orlando Open II

Final
- Champion: (United States) Christopher Eubanks
- Runner-up: (Colombia) Nicolás Mejía
- Score: 2–6, 7–6^{(7–3)}, 6–4

Events
Singles	Doubles
- Orlando Open

Jenson Brooksby was the defending champion but withdrew from the quarterfinals.

Christopher Eubanks won the title after defeating Nicolás Mejía 2–6, 7–6^{(7–3)}, 6–4 in the final.

== Seeds ==
1. (Japan) Yasutaka Uchiyama (first round)
2. (Chinese Taipei) Jason Jung (first round)
3. (United States) Jenson Brooksby (quarterfinals, withdrew)
4. (Italy) Paolo Lorenzi (first round)
5. (Ecuador) Emilio Gómez (quarterfinals)
6. (United States) Ernesto Escobedo (first round)
7. (Argentina) Guido Andreozzi (second round)
8. (United States) Mitchell Krueger (second round)

== Draw ==
Key

- Q = Qualifier
- WC = Wild card
- LL = Lucky loser
- Alt = Alternate
- ITF = ITF entry
- PR = Protected ranking
- SR = Special ranking
- SE = Special exempt
- JE = Junior exempt
- JR = Junior Accelerator Programme entrant
- CO = College Accelerator Programme entrant
- NG = Next Gen Accelerator Program entrant
- w/o = Walkover
- r = Retired
- d = Defaulted

=== Finals ===
Semifinals
(United States) JC Aragone	6	6^{1}	0
Q	(Colombia) Nicolás Mejía	1	7^{7}	6
WC	(United States) Sam Riffice	3	6^{3}
(United States) Christopher Eubanks	6	7^{7}

Final
Q	(Colombia) Nicolás Mejía	6	6^{3}	4
(United States) Christopher Eubanks	2	7^{7}	6

=== Top half ===
First round
1	(Japan) Y Uchiyama	5	2
(United States) JC Aragone	7	6
Q	(Argentina) TA Tirante	6	6
Q	(United States) S Kozlov	3	1
(United States) C Harrison	6	6
(Japan) H Moriya	0	2
WC	(United States) O Crawford	6^{2}	7^{7}	3
5	(Ecuador) E Gómez	7^{7}	6^{4}	6
3	(United States) J Brooksby	7^{7}	6
(Barbados) D King	6^{5}	3
(Ecuador) R Quiroz	6^{4}	4
(Australia) J Kubler	7^{7}	6
Q	(Colombia) N Mejía	6	6
(India) S Mukund	4	1
Q	(Australia) D Kelly	6	4	5
7	(Argentina) G Andreozzi	4	6	7

Second round
(United States) JC Aragone	6	7
Q	(Argentina) TA Tirante	3	5
(United States) C Harrison	3	3
5	(Ecuador) E Gómez	6	6
3	(United States) J Brooksby	6	6
(Australia) J Kubler	3	1
Q	(Colombia) N Mejía	7	6
7	(Argentina) G Andreozzi	5	3

Quarterfinals
(United States) JC Aragone	6	7
5	(Ecuador) E Gómez	4	5
3	(United States) J Brooksby
Q	(Colombia) N Mejía	w/o

Semifinals
(United States) JC Aragone	6	6^{1}	0
Q	(Colombia) N Mejía	1	7^{7}	6

=== Bottom half ===
First round
6	(United States) E Escobedo	4	6^{4}
(United States) T-S Kwiatkowski	6	7^{7}
(United States) U Blanch	6	6
(United States) K King	4	4
(Portugal) G Oliveira	2	2^{r}
(Dominican Republic) R Cid Subervi	6	4
WC	(United States) S Riffice	6	6
4	(Italy) P Lorenzi	2	4
8	(United States) M Krueger	6	7
(United States) J Sock	2	5
(United States) C Eubanks	6	6
(United States) A Ritschard	3	4
(Canada) P Polansky	6	6
WC	(United States) D Young	2	2
(Chile) N Jarry	6	7
2	(Chinese Taipei) J Jung	4	5

Second round
(United States) T-S Kwiatkowski	6^{5}	6	2
(United States) U Blanch	7^{7}	3	6
(Dominican Republic) R Cid Subervi	2	2
WC	(United States) S Riffice	6	6
8	(United States) M Krueger	6^{5}	6^{3}
(United States) C Eubanks	7^{7}	7^{7}
(Canada) P Polansky	3	3
(Chile) N Jarry	6	6

Quarterfinals
(United States) U Blanch	1	5
WC	(United States) S Riffice	6	7
(United States) C Eubanks	6	7
(Chile) N Jarry	3	5

Semifinals
WC	(United States) S Riffice	3	6^{3}
(United States) C Eubanks	6	7^{7}
