= 2017 US Open – Men's singles qualifying =

Men's singles qualifying
- 2017 US Open

Events
Singles	men	women		boys	girls
Doubles	men	women	mixed	boys	girls
WC Singles	men	women	quad
WC Doubles	men	women	quad
Legends	men	women	mixed

Qualification
Singles	men	women
- US Open

== Seeds ==
1. (Argentina) Leonardo Mayer (qualifying competition, lucky loser)
2. (Canada) Denis Shapovalov (qualified)
3. (Italy) Alessandro Giannessi (moved to main draw)
4. (Ukraine) Sergiy Stakhovsky (qualifying competition)
5. (Italy) Marco Cecchinato (first round)
6. (Kazakhstan) Mikhail Kukushkin (qualified)
7. (Kazakhstan) Alexander Bublik (first round)
8. (Germany) Peter Gojowczyk (qualifying competition)
9. (Germany) Cedrik-Marcel Stebe (qualified)
10. (Argentina) Facundo Bagnis (second round, retired)
11. (Norway) Casper Ruud (second round)
12. (Serbia) Filip Krajinović (second round)
13. (Argentina) Renzo Olivo (second round)
14. (France) Nicolas Mahut (qualified)
15. (Slovakia) Lukáš Lacko (qualifying competition, lucky loser)
16. (France) Quentin Halys (first round)
17. (Belarus) Egor Gerasimov (second round)
18. (Germany) Maximilian Marterer (qualified)
19. (Portugal) Pedro Sousa (first round)
20. (Canada) Peter Polansky (qualifying competition)
21. (Chile) Nicolás Jarry (second round)
22. (Japan) Go Soeda (qualifying competition)
23. (Austria) Sebastian Ofner (first round)
24. (Germany) Yannick Hanfmann (second round)
25. (Austria) Gerald Melzer (first round)
26. (Australia) Matthew Ebden (first round)
27. (Moldova) Radu Albot (qualified)
28. (Italy) Matteo Berrettini (second round)
29. (United States) Stefan Kozlov (first round)
30. (Italy) Stefano Travaglia (qualified)
31. (United States) Michael Mmoh (qualifying competition)
32. (France) Kenny de Schepper (first round)

== Qualifiers ==
1. (Germany) Maximilian Marterer
2. (Canada) Denis Shapovalov
3. (Moldova) Radu Albot
4. (Czech Republic) Václav Šafránek
5. (United States) JC Aragone
6. (Kazakhstan) Mikhail Kukushkin
7. (United Kingdom) Cameron Norrie
8. (Italy) Stefano Travaglia
9. (Germany) Cedrik-Marcel Stebe
10. (Spain) Adrián Menéndez-Maceiras
11. (France) Vincent Millot
12. (Australia) John-Patrick Smith
13. (United States) Evan King
14. (France) Nicolas Mahut
15. (Barbados) Darian King
16. (United States) Tim Smyczek

== Lucky losers ==
1. (Argentina) Leonardo Mayer
2. (Slovakia) Lukáš Lacko

== Qualifying draw ==
=== First qualifier ===
First round
1	(Argentina) Leonardo Mayer	6	6
(France) Maxime Janvier	4	4
(France) Gleb Sakharov	6	6
(Czech Republic) Petr Michnev	0	2
(United States) Dennis Novikov	6	2	7
(Japan) Yasutaka Uchiyama	3	6	5
(Croatia) Viktor Galović	2	4
18	(Germany) Maximilian Marterer	6	6

Second round
1	(Argentina) Leonardo Mayer	6	6
(France) Gleb Sakharov	2	1
(United States) Dennis Novikov	6	5	3
18	(Germany) Maximilian Marterer	3	7	6

Qualifying competition
1	(Argentina) Leonardo Mayer	4	5
18	(Germany) Maximilian Marterer	6	7

=== Second qualifier ===
First round
2	(Canada) Denis Shapovalov	6	6
(United States) Denis Kudla	3	4
(Portugal) Gonçalo Oliveira	2	6	1
(Portugal) Gastão Elias	6	4	6
(United States) Mackenzie McDonald	6	6
(Germany) Yannick Maden	4	3
(Czech Republic) Jan Šátral	6	6
19	(Portugal) Pedro Sousa	3	2

Second round
2	(Canada) Denis Shapovalov	6	7
(Portugal) Gastão Elias	3	5
(United States) Mackenzie McDonald	4	3
(Czech Republic) Jan Šátral	6	6

Qualifying competition
2	(Canada) Denis Shapovalov	6^{2}	6	6
(Czech Republic) Jan Šátral	7^{7}	1	3

=== Third qualifier ===
First round
Alt	(France) Stéphane Robert	6	6
(Italy) Lorenzo Giustino	4	2
PR	(Canada) Frank Dancevic	4	6	6
(Italy) Luca Vanni	6	4	4
(United States) Marcos Giron	3	4
(Chile) Christian Garín	6	6
(Portugal) João Domingues	0	1
27	(Moldova) Radu Albot	6	6

Second round
Alt	(France) Stéphane Robert	3	7^{8}	5
PR	(Canada) Frank Dancevic	6	6^{6}	7
(Chile) Christian Garín	4	4
27	(Moldova) Radu Albot	6	6

Qualifying competition
PR	(Canada) Frank Dancevic	2	4
27	(Moldova) Radu Albot	6	6

=== Fourth qualifier ===
First round
4	(Ukraine) Sergiy Stakhovsky	6	6
(Russia) Alexey Vatutin	2	1
(Japan) Hiroki Moriya	3	3
(Canada) Félix Auger-Aliassime	6	6
(Czech Republic) Václav Šafránek	7^{7}	3	6
(Germany) Daniel Masur	6^{5}	6	3
(India) Prajnesh Gunneswaran	1	4
24	(Germany) Yannick Hanfmann	6	6

Second round
4	(Ukraine) Sergiy Stakhovsky	7^{10}	6
(Canada) Félix Auger-Aliassime	6^{8}	4
(Czech Republic) Václav Šafránek	2	6	7
24	(Germany) Yannick Hanfmann	6	4	5

Qualifying competition
4	(Ukraine) Sergiy Stakhovsky	6	5	1
(Czech Republic) Václav Šafránek	3	7	6

=== Fifth qualifier ===
First round
5	(Italy) Marco Cecchinato	6	2	4
WC	(United States) JC Aragone	4	6	6
(Italy) Riccardo Bellotti	7	6
(Argentina) Andrea Collarini	5	3
(Belarus) Uladzimir Ignatik	6	2	6
(Argentina) Máximo González	4	6	0
(Australia) Akira Santillan	3	6	6
23	(Austria) Sebastian Ofner	6	3	4

Second round
WC	(United States) JC Aragone	3	7	6
(Italy) Riccardo Bellotti	6	5	3
(Belarus) Uladzimir Ignatik	3	2
(Australia) Akira Santillan	6	6

Qualifying competition
WC	(United States) JC Aragone	6	2	6
(Australia) Akira Santillan	3	6	3

=== Sixth qualifier ===
First round
6	(Kazakhstan) Mikhail Kukushkin	6	6
(Slovakia) Jozef Kovalík	1	3
(Germany) Tobias Kamke	6	6
(United States) Noah Rubin	1	4
PR	(United States) Bradley Klahn	6	0	6
(Australia) Marc Polmans	2	6	2
(Argentina) Guido Andreozzi	6	6
29	(United States) Stefan Kozlov	4	1

Second round
6	(Kazakhstan) Mikhail Kukushkin	6	7^{7}
(Germany) Tobias Kamke	4	6^{4}
PR	(United States) Bradley Klahn	4	7^{8}	4
(Argentina) Guido Andreozzi	6	6^{6}	6

Qualifying competition
6	(Kazakhstan) Mikhail Kukushkin	6	4	7
(Argentina) Guido Andreozzi	1	6	5

=== Seventh qualifier ===
First round
7	(Kazakhstan) Alexander Bublik	2	2
(United Kingdom) Cameron Norrie	6	6
(Russia) Teymuraz Gabashvili	6^{12}	6	2
WC	(United States) Sekou Bangoura	7^{14}	4	6
(Switzerland) Marco Chiudinelli	6	6
(Australia) Blake Mott	3	2
(India) Yuki Bhambri	6	1	3
22	(Japan) Go Soeda	4	6	6

Second round
(United Kingdom) Cameron Norrie	6	7
WC	(United States) Sekou Bangoura	4	5
(Switzerland) Marco Chiudinelli	3	1
22	(Japan) Go Soeda	6	6

Qualifying competition
(United Kingdom) Cameron Norrie	6	7^{7}
22	(Japan) Go Soeda	1	6^{5}

=== Eighth qualifier ===
First round
8	(Germany) Peter Gojowczyk	6^{6}	6	6
(Serbia) Nikola Milojević	7^{8}	4	4
(United States) Reilly Opelka	6^{5}	6	7^{7}
(United States) Alexander Sarkissian	7^{7}	3	6^{2}
(United States) Christian Harrison	6	1
(Republic of Ireland) James McGee	2	0^{r}
(Kazakhstan) Aleksandr Nedovyesov	6^{5}	5
30	(Italy) Stefano Travaglia	7^{7}	7

Second round
8	(Germany) Peter Gojowczyk	7^{7}	6
(United States) Reilly Opelka	6^{4}	2
(United States) Christian Harrison	3	1
30	(Italy) Stefano Travaglia	6	6

Qualifying competition
8	(Germany) Peter Gojowczyk	3	3
30	(Italy) Stefano Travaglia	6	6

=== Ninth qualifier ===
First round
9	(Germany) Cedrik-Marcel Stebe	6	6
(Bosnia and Herzegovina) Aldin Šetkić	4	2
(Bosnia and Herzegovina) Mirza Bašić	6	7^{7}
(Australia) Sam Groth	4	6^{4}
(Argentina) Marco Trungelliti	7^{7}	6
WC	(United States) Jared Hiltzik	6^{5}	3
PR	(Colombia) Alejandro González	4	6	6
26	(Australia) Matthew Ebden	6	4	4

Second round
9	(Germany) Cedrik-Marcel Stebe	6	6
(Bosnia and Herzegovina) Mirza Bašić	3	4
(Argentina) Marco Trungelliti	5	3
PR	(Colombia) Alejandro González	7	6

Qualifying competition
9	(Germany) Cedrik-Marcel Stebe	6	6
PR	(Colombia) Alejandro González	2	4

=== Tenth qualifier ===
First round
10	(Argentina) Facundo Bagnis	6	6
(Belarus) Ilya Ivashka	2	0
(Ecuador) Roberto Quiroz	2	6	5
(Spain) Adrián Menéndez-Maceiras	6	4	7
(Ukraine) Illya Marchenko	6	3	4
(Belgium) Joris De Loore	3	6	6
(South Korea) Lee Duck-hee	6	6
25	(Austria) Gerald Melzer	4	3

Second round
10	(Argentina) Facundo Bagnis	4^{r}
(Spain) Adrián Menéndez-Maceiras	3
(Belgium) Joris De Loore	6	6
(South Korea) Lee Duck-hee	4	2

Qualifying competition
(Spain) Adrián Menéndez-Maceiras	6	6
(Belgium) Joris De Loore	3	3

=== Eleventh qualifier ===
First round
11	(Norway) Casper Ruud	6	6
(Kazakhstan) Dmitry Popko	4	0
(Italy) Simone Bolelli	6	6
(Germany) Daniel Brands	2	3
(United Kingdom) Brydan Klein	6	3	6^{7}
(France) Vincent Millot	3	6	7^{9}
(Japan) Tatsuma Ito	2	6	6
32	(France) Kenny de Schepper	6	3	4

Second round
11	(Norway) Casper Ruud	2	4
(Italy) Simone Bolelli	6	6
(France) Vincent Millot	6	6
(Japan) Tatsuma Ito	0	4

Qualifying competition
(Italy) Simone Bolelli	6	4	3
(France) Vincent Millot	1	6	6

=== Twelfth qualifier ===
First round
12	(Serbia) Filip Krajinović	5	6	6
(Czech Republic) Lukáš Rosol	7	4	2
WC	(United States) J. J. Wolf	4	1
(Australia) John-Patrick Smith	6	6
(Canada) Brayden Schnur	6	4	5
(United States) Mitchell Krueger	4	6	7
(Argentina) Federico Coria	3	4
17	(Belarus) Egor Gerasimov	6	6

Second round
12	(Serbia) Filip Krajinović	4	4
(Australia) John-Patrick Smith	6	6
(United States) Mitchell Krueger	7	6
17	(Belarus) Egor Gerasimov	5	4

Qualifying competition
(Australia) John-Patrick Smith	6	6
(United States) Mitchell Krueger	4	4

=== Thirteenth qualifier ===
First round
13	(Argentina) Renzo Olivo	7^{7}	6
(Germany) Jeremy Jahn	6^{5}	4
WC	(United States) Evan King	7^{7}	6
(Italy) Salvatore Caruso	6^{2}	2
(Turkey) Cem İlkel	6	6
WC	(United States) William Blumberg	2	4
PR	(Netherlands) Igor Sijsling	3	2
31	(United States) Michael Mmoh	6	6

Second round
13	(Argentina) Renzo Olivo	6	1	0
WC	(United States) Evan King	3	6	6
(Turkey) Cem İlkel	1	2
31	(United States) Michael Mmoh	6	6

Qualifying competition
WC	(United States) Evan King	6	6
31	(United States) Michael Mmoh	3	3

=== Fourteenth qualifier ===
First round
14	(France) Nicolas Mahut	6	6
(South Korea) Kwon Soon-woo	3	4
(India) Ramkumar Ramanathan	6	6
(France) Paul-Henri Mathieu	4	4
(China) Wu Di	6	1	1
(Greece) Stefanos Tsitsipas	4	6	6
(El Salvador) Marcelo Arévalo	2	6^{0}
28	(Italy) Matteo Berrettini	6	7^{7}

Second round
14	(France) Nicolas Mahut	6	6^{5}	6
(India) Ramkumar Ramanathan	3	7^{7}	2
(Greece) Stefanos Tsitsipas	6^{6}	7^{7}	7^{7}
28	(Italy) Matteo Berrettini	7^{8}	6^{4}	6^{2}

Qualifying competition
14	(France) Nicolas Mahut	7^{8}	3	6
(Greece) Stefanos Tsitsipas	6^{6}	6	0

=== Fifteenth qualifier ===
First round
15	(Slovakia) Lukáš Lacko	6	6
(Lithuania) Laurynas Grigelis	3	4
WC	(United States) Austin Krajicek	4	7^{7}	7^{7}
(Egypt) Mohamed Safwat	6	6^{2}	6^{4}
(Barbados) Darian King	6	6
WC	(United States) Daniel Nguyen	2	1
(France) Calvin Hemery	5	3
21	(Chile) Nicolás Jarry	7	6

Second round
15	(Slovakia) Lukáš Lacko	7^{7}	7^{8}
WC	(United States) Austin Krajicek	6^{5}	6^{6}
(Barbados) Darian King	7^{7}	6
21	(Chile) Nicolás Jarry	6^{4}	3

Qualifying competition
15	(Slovakia) Lukáš Lacko	6	4	3
(Barbados) Darian King	3	6	6

=== Sixteenth qualifier ===
First round
16	(France) Quentin Halys	6^{5}	4
(United States) Tim Smyczek	7^{7}	6
(France) Benjamin Bonzi	2	3
WC	(United States) Raymond Sarmiento	6	6
(Italy) Stefano Napolitano	3	2
(Slovenia) Blaž Rola	6	6
(Russia) Konstantin Kravchuk	3	6^{5}
20	(Canada) Peter Polansky	6	7^{7}

Second round
(United States) Tim Smyczek	6	6
WC	(United States) Raymond Sarmiento	1	3
(Slovenia) Blaž Rola	6	4	3
20	(Canada) Peter Polansky	3	6	6

Qualifying competition
(United States) Tim Smyczek	6	6
20	(Canada) Peter Polansky	3	4
