= 2019 Orlando Open – Doubles =

Doubles
- 2019 Orlando Open

Final
- Champions: (Monaco) Romain Arneodo (Belarus) Andrei Vasilevski
- Runners-up: (Portugal) Gonçalo Oliveira (Italy) Andrea Vavassori
- Score: 7–6^{(7–2)}, 2–6, [15–13]

Events
Singles	Doubles
- Orlando Open

This was the first edition of the tournament.

Romain Arneodo and Andrei Vasilevski won the title after defeating Gonçalo Oliveira and Andrea Vavassori 7–6^{(7–2)}, 2–6, [15–13] in the final.

== Seeds ==
1. (Monaco) Romain Arneodo / (Belarus) Andrei Vasilevski (champions)
2. (United States) Robert Galloway / (United States) Nathaniel Lammons (first round)
3. (Portugal) Gonçalo Oliveira / (Italy) Andrea Vavassori (final)
4. (United States) Evan King / (United States) Hunter Reese (semifinals)

== Draw ==
Key

- Q = Qualifier
- WC = Wild card
- LL = Lucky loser
- Alt = Alternate
- ITF = ITF entry
- PR = Protected ranking
- SR = Special ranking
- SE = Special exempt
- JE = Junior exempt
- JR = Junior Accelerator Programme entrant
- CO = College Accelerator Programme entrant
- NG = Next Gen Accelerator Program entrant
- w/o = Walkover
- r = Retired
- d = Defaulted

First round
1	(Monaco) R Arneodo (Belarus) A Vasilevski	6	4	[10]
ITF	(France) F Reboul (Portugal) B Saraiva	3	6	[8]
(Italy) G Mager (United States) D Novikov	2	2
(Ecuador) G Escobar (Venezuela) R Maytín	6	6
4	(United States) E King (United States) H Reese	6	3	[11]
(United States) K King (United States) N Pasha	3	6	[9]
ITF	(Brazil) J Menezes (Brazil) J Souza	3	1
WC	(United States) U Blanch (United States) S Riffice	6	6
(Mexico) H Hach Verdugo (Croatia) A Pavić	7^{7}	6^{5}	[6]
(Lithuania) L Grigelis (Belarus) U Ignatik	6^{4}	7^{7}	[10]
(Serbia) N Čačić (Brazil) F Romboli	3	2
3	(Portugal) G Oliveira (Italy) A Vavassori	6	6
(France) B Bonzi (France) J Eysseric	4	6	[5]
(Venezuela) LD Martínez (Sweden) A Siljeström	6	1	[10]
(United States) JC Aragone (United States) A Lawson	6	6
2	(United States) R Galloway (United States) N Lammons	2	4

Quarterfinals
1	(Monaco) R Arneodo (Belarus) A Vasilevski	7	6^{2}	[10]
(Ecuador) G Escobar (Venezuela) R Maytín	5	7^{7}	[6]
4	(United States) E King (United States) H Reese	6	6
WC	(United States) U Blanch (United States) S Riffice	3	4
(Lithuania) L Grigelis (Belarus) U Ignatik	4	2
3	(Portugal) G Oliveira (Italy) A Vavassori	6	6
(Venezuela) LD Martínez (Sweden) A Siljeström	3	7^{8}	[10]
(United States) JC Aragone (United States) A Lawson	6	6^{6}	[5]

Semifinals
1	(Monaco) R Arneodo (Belarus) A Vasilevski	6	7^{7}
4	(United States) E King (United States) H Reese	3	6^{5}
3	(Portugal) G Oliveira (Italy) A Vavassori	4	6	[10]
(Venezuela) LD Martínez (Sweden) A Siljeström	6	2	[5]

Final
1	(Monaco) R Arneodo (Belarus) A Vasilevski	7^{7}	2	[15]
3	(Portugal) G Oliveira (Italy) A Vavassori	6^{2}	6	[13]
