= 2019 Orlando Open – Singles =

Singles
- 2019 Orlando Open

Final
- Champion: (United States) Marcos Giron
- Runner-up: (Barbados) Darian King
- Score: 6–4, 6–4

Events
Singles	Doubles
- Orlando Open

This was the first edition of the tournament.

Marcos Giron won the title after defeating Darian King 6–4, 6–4 in the final.

== Seeds ==
All seeds receive a bye into the second round.

1. (Barbados) Darian King (final)
2. (United States) Mitchell Krueger (second round)
3. (Netherlands) Thiemo de Bakker (second round)
4. (Canada) Filip Peliwo (second round)
5. (Slovakia) Norbert Gombos (quarterfinals)
6. (Belarus) Uladzimir Ignatik (second round)
7. (Dominican Republic) Roberto Cid Subervi (third round)
8. (United States) JC Aragone (second round)
9. (United States) Dennis Novikov (third round)
10. (France) Benjamin Bonzi (second round)
11. (United States) Kevin King (third round)
12. (Portugal) Gastão Elias (semifinals)
13. (Croatia) Nino Serdarušić (quarterfinals)
14. (France) Mathias Bourgue (quarterfinals)
15. (Spain) Bernabé Zapata Miralles (second round)
16. (France) Johan Tatlot (third round)

== Draw ==
Key

- Q = Qualifier
- WC = Wild card
- LL = Lucky loser
- Alt = Alternate
- ITF = ITF entry
- PR = Protected ranking
- SR = Special ranking
- SE = Special exempt
- JE = Junior exempt
- JR = Junior Accelerator Programme entrant
- CO = College Accelerator Programme entrant
- NG = Next Gen Accelerator Program entrant
- w/o = Walkover
- r = Retired
- d = Defaulted

=== Finals ===
Quarterfinals
1	(Barbados) Darian King	7	3	6
5	(Slovakia) Norbert Gombos	5	6	3
(United States) Ulises Blanch	6^{3}	6	6^{3}
WC	(United States) Michael Redlicki	7^{7}	4	7^{7}
(United States) Marcos Giron	6	6
14	(France) Mathias Bourgue	2	2
12	(Portugal) Gastão Elias	6	6
13	(Croatia) Nino Serdarušić	3	3

Semifinals
1	(Barbados) Darian King	6	6
WC	(United States) Michael Redlicki	4	2
(United States) Marcos Giron	6	7
12	(Portugal) Gastão Elias	3	5

Final
1	(Barbados) Darian King	4	4
(United States) Marcos Giron	6	6

=== Top half ===
==== Section 1 ====
First round
(United States) E King	6	6
(Argentina) F Coria	3	2
(United States) A Sarkissian	6	3	6
(Italy) G Mager	0	6	3
(Japan) K Uchida	1	2
WC	(United States) Evan Song	6	6
ITF	(Netherlands) J Sels	6^{3}	4
(United Kingdom) L Broady	7^{7}	6

Second round
1	(Barbados) D King	6	6
(United States) E King	0	2
(United States) A Sarkissian	5	0
16	(France) J Tatlot	7	6
10	(France) B Bonzi	2	4
WC	(United States) E Song	6	6
(United Kingdom) L Broady	5	2
5	(Slovakia) N Gombos	7	6

Third round
1	(Barbados) D King	6	6
16	(France) J Tatlot	3	3
WC	(United States) E Song	7^{7}	5	6^{4}
5	(Slovakia) N Gombos	6^{3}	7	7^{7}

Quarterfinals
1	(Barbados) D King	7	3	6
5	(Slovakia) N Gombos	5	6	3

==== Section 2 ====
First round
(Lithuania) L Grigelis	1	2
(United States) U Blanch	6	6
(Spain) R Ojeda Lara	7	0	2
LL	(Netherlands) G Brouwer	5	6	6
ITF	(France) Tom Jomby	7^{7}	6
(Spain) C Taberner	6^{5}	2
(Czech Republic) V Šafránek	6^{3}	2
WC	(United States) Mi Redlicki	7^{7}	6

Second round
3	(Netherlands) T de Bakker	5	6	3
(United States) U Blanch	7	4	6
LL	(Netherlands) G Brouwer	1	6	6
15	(Spain) B Zapata Miralles	6	1	2
11	(United States) K King	6	6
ITF	(France) T Jomby	3	0
WC	(United States) Mi Redlicki	1	6	6
8	(United States) JC Aragone	6	4	3

Third round
(United States) U Blanch	2	6	6
LL	(Netherlands) G Brouwer	6	3	3
11	(United States) K King	6	2	2
WC	(United States) Mi Redlicki	2	6	6

Quarterfinals
(United States) U Blanch	6^{3}	6	6^{3}
WC	(United States) Mi Redlicki	7^{7}	4	7^{7}

=== Bottom half ===
==== Section 3 ====
First round
(Argentina) A Collarini	7^{7}	2	0
(United States) M Giron	6^{4}	6	6
WC	(United States) Jared Hiltzik	6	5	1
ITF	(Brazil) J Souza	2	7	6
(Austria) L Miedler	5	6	6
Q	(United States) J. J. Wolf	7	3	4
WC	(United States) S Riffice	6	2	6
(United Kingdom) J Choinski	1	6	3

Second round
6	(Belarus) U Ignatik	1	5
(United States) M Giron	6	7
ITF	(Brazil) J Souza	3	2
9	(United States) D Novikov	6	6
14	(France) M Bourgue	6	2	6
(Austria) L Miedler	4	6	3
WC	(United States) S Riffice	1	6	6
4	(Canada) F Peliwo	6	2	0

Third round
(United States) M Giron	6	6
9	(United States) D Novikov	1	2
14	(France) M Bourgue	6	5	6
WC	(United States) S Riffice	4	7	2

Quarterfinals
(United States) M Giron	6	6
14	(France) M Bourgue	2	2

==== Section 4 ====
First round
WC	(United States) A Rybakov	6	6^{5}	6^{6}
(Portugal) G Oliveira	2	7^{7}	7^{8}
Q	(Brazil) J Menezes	1	1
(France) E Couacaud	6	6
(Netherlands) S Griekspoor	6	7
ITF	(France) F Reboul	2	5
(Colombia) A González	2	6	4
(United States) S Kozlov	6	4	6

Second round
7	(Dominican Republic) R Cid Subervi	6	6
(Portugal) G Oliveira	3	3
(France) E Couacaud	4	5
12	(Portugal) G Elias	6	7
13	(Croatia) N Serdarušić	7^{9}	6
(Netherlands) S Griekspoor	6^{7}	1
(United States) S Kozlov	6	5	6
2	(United States) M Krueger	2	7	3

Third round
7	(Dominican Republic) R Cid Subervi	0	4
12	(Portugal) G Elias	6	6
13	(Croatia) N Serdarušić	6	7
(United States) S Kozlov	2	5

Quarterfinals
12	(Portugal) G Elias	6	6
13	(Croatia) N Serdarušić	3	3
