= 2021 Orlando Open II =

- Date: 7–13 June
- Edition: 4th
- Surface: Hard
- Location: Orlando, Florida, United States

Champions

Singles
- (United States) Christopher Eubanks

Doubles
- (United States) Christian Harrison / (Canada) Peter Polansky
- Orlando Open

The 2021 Orlando Open II was a professional tennis tournament played on hard courts. It was the fourth edition of the tournament which was part of the 2021 ATP Challenger Tour. It took place in Orlando, Florida, United States between 7 and 13 June 2021.

== Singles main-draw entrants ==
=== Seeds ===
Country	Player	Rank^{1}	Seed
JPN	Yasutaka Uchiyama	115	1
TPE	Jason Jung	160	2
USA	Jenson Brooksby	163	3
ITA	Paolo Lorenzi	167	4
ECU	Emilio Gómez	179	5
USA	Ernesto Escobedo	188	6
ARG	Guido Andreozzi	200	7
USA	Mitchell Krueger	207	8

- ^{1} Rankings are as of 31 May 2021.

=== Other entrants ===
The following players received wildcards into the singles main draw:

- (United States) Oliver Crawford
- (United States) Sam Riffice
- (United States) Donald Young

The following players received entry from the qualifying draw:

- (Australia) Dayne Kelly
- (United States) Stefan Kozlov
- (Colombia) Nicolás Mejía
- (Argentina) Thiago Agustín Tirante

== Champions ==
=== Singles ===
- (United States) Christopher Eubanks def. (Colombia) Nicolás Mejía 2–6, 7–6^{(7–3)}, 6–4.

=== Doubles ===
- (United States) Christian Harrison / (Canada) Peter Polansky def. (United States) JC Aragone / (Colombia) Nicolás Barrientos 6–2, 6–3.
