= 2019 Orlando Open =

- Date: 31 December – 6 January
- Edition: 1st
- Draw: 48S / 4Q / 16D
- Surface: Hard
- Location: Orlando, Florida, United States

Champions

Singles
- (United States) Marcos Giron

Doubles
- (Monaco) Romain Arneodo / (Belarus) Andrei Vasilevski
- Orlando Open

The 2019 Orlando Open was a professional tennis tournament played on hard courts. It was the first edition of the tournament which was part of the 2019 ATP Challenger Tour. It took place in Orlando, Florida, United States between 31 December 2018 and 6 January 2019.

== Singles main-draw entrants ==
=== Seeds ===
Country	Player	Rank^{1}	Seed
BAR	Darian King	198	1
USA	Mitchell Krueger	228	2
NED	Thiemo de Bakker	242	3
CAN	Filip Peliwo	243	4
SVK	Norbert Gombos	247	5
BLR	Uladzimir Ignatik	250	6
DOM	Roberto Cid Subervi	251	7
USA	JC Aragone	254	8
USA	Dennis Novikov	257	9
FRA	Benjamin Bonzi	261	10
USA	Kevin King	262	11
POR	Gastão Elias	263	12
CRO	Nino Serdarušić	264	13
FRA	Mathias Bourgue	265	14
ESP	Bernabé Zapata Miralles	266	15
FRA	Johan Tatlot	269	16

=== Other entrants ===
The following players received wildcards into the singles main draw:

- (United States) Jared Hiltzik
- (United States) Michael Redlicki
- (United States) Sam Riffice
- (United States) Alex Rybakov
- (United States) Evan Song

The following players received entry into the singles main draw using their ITF World Tennis Ranking:

- (France) Tom Jomby
- (France) Fabien Reboul
- (Netherlands) Jelle Sels
- (Brazil) João Souza

The following players received entry from the qualifying draw:

- (Brazil) João Menezes
- (United States) J. J. Wolf

The following player received entry as a lucky loser:

- (Netherlands) Gijs Brouwer

== Champions ==
=== Singles ===
- (United States) Marcos Giron def. (Barbados) Darian King 6–4, 6–4

=== Doubles ===
- (Monaco) Romain Arneodo / (Belarus) Andrei Vasilevski def. (Portugal) Gonçalo Oliveira / (Italy) Andrea Vavassori 7–6^{(7–2)}, 2–6, [15–13]
