= 2021 Orlando Open II – Doubles =

Doubles
- 2021 Orlando Open II

Final
- Champions: (United States) Christian Harrison (Canada) Peter Polansky
- Runners-up: (United States) JC Aragone (Colombia) Nicolás Barrientos
- Score: 6–2, 6–3

Events
Singles	Doubles
- Orlando Open

Mitchell Krueger and Jack Sock were the defending champions but chose not to defend their title.

Christian Harrison and Peter Polansky won the title after defeating JC Aragone and Nicolás Barrientos 6–2, 6–3 in the final.

== Seeds ==
1. (United States) Robert Galloway / (United States) Alex Lawson (semifinals)
2. (United States) Dennis Novikov / (Portugal) Gonçalo Oliveira (first round)
3. (India) Jeevan Nedunchezhiyan / (India) Purav Raja (first round)
4. (United States) Christian Harrison / (Canada) Peter Polansky (champions)

== Draw ==
Key

- Q = Qualifier
- WC = Wild card
- LL = Lucky loser
- Alt = Alternate
- ITF = ITF entry
- PR = Protected ranking
- SR = Special ranking
- SE = Special exempt
- JE = Junior exempt
- JR = Junior Accelerator Programme entrant
- CO = College Accelerator Programme entrant
- NG = Next Gen Accelerator Program entrant
- w/o = Walkover
- r = Retired
- d = Defaulted

First round
1	(United States) R Galloway (United States) A Lawson	4	7^{7}	[10]
(Bolivia) B Arias (United States) JA Ore	6	6^{4}	[4]
(Philippines) R Gonzales (United States) Ma Redlicki	6	7^{7}
(Israel) E Leshem (Japan) H Moriya	3	6^{4}
4	(United States) C Harrison (Canada) P Polansky	6	6
(United States) H Johnson (South Africa) R Roelofse	1	3
(United States) S Bangoura (United States) D Young	6	6
(Argentina) G Andreozzi (Argentina) A Velotti	1	4
(United States) JC Aragone (Colombia) N Barrientos	6	6
(United States) Y Johnson (United States) Mi Redlicki	2	1
WC	(United States) Jack Vance (United States) Tennyson Whiting	6	3	[10]
3	(India) J Nedunchezhiyan (India) P Raja	3	6	[7]
WC	(Peru) N Álvarez (United States) N Chappell	3	2
(Barbados) D King (Australia) J Kubler	6	6
WC	(United States) O Crawford (United States) S Riffice	6	4	[10]
2	(United States) D Novikov (Portugal) G Oliveira	2	6	[4]

Quarterfinals
1	(United States) R Galloway (United States) A Lawson	6	6
(Philippines) R Gonzales (United States) Ma Redlicki	4	4
4	(United States) C Harrison (Canada) P Polansky	2	6	[10]
(United States) S Bangoura (United States) D Young	6	2	[6]
(United States) JC Aragone (Colombia) N Barrientos	6	6
WC	(United States) Jac Vance (United States) T Whiting	4	0
(Barbados) D King (Australia) J Kubler	6	7^{7}
WC	(United States) O Crawford (United States) S Riffice	4	6^{4}

Semifinals
1	(United States) R Galloway (United States) A Lawson	6^{5}	7	[4]
4	(United States) C Harrison (Canada) P Polansky	7^{7}	5	[10]
(United States) JC Aragone (Colombia) N Barrientos	7^{7}	6
(Barbados) D King (Australia) J Kubler	6^{4}	2

Final
4	(United States) C Harrison (Canada) P Polansky	6	6
(United States) JC Aragone (Colombia) N Barrientos	2	3
