= 2022 Orlando Open =

- Date: June 6–12
- Edition: 5th
- Surface: Hard
- Location: Orlando, Florida, United States

Champions

Singles
- (China) Wu Yibing

Doubles
- (South Korea) Chung Yun-seong / (Greece) Michail Pervolarakis
← 2021 ·	Orlando Open	· 2023 →

The 2022 Orlando Open was a professional tennis tournament played on hard courts. It was the fifth edition of the tournament which was part of the 2022 ATP Challenger Tour. It took place in Orlando, Florida, United States between June 6 and 12 2022.

== Singles main-draw entrants ==
=== Seeds ===
Country	Player	Rank^{1}	Seed
USA	J. J. Wolf	125	1
ECU	Emilio Gómez	151	2
USA	Christopher Eubanks	156	3
AUS	Jason Kubler	159	4
USA	Michael Mmoh	175	5
TUR	Altuğ Çelikbilek	179	6
USA	Bjorn Fratangelo	185	7
AUS	Rinky Hijikata	233	8

- ^{1} Rankings are as of May 23, 2022.

=== Other entrants ===
The following players received wildcards into the singles main draw:

- (United States) Brandon Holt
- (United States) Aleksandar Kovacevic
- (United States) Ben Shelton

The following players received entry into the singles main draw using protected rankings:

- (Australia) ~~Andrew Harris~~
- (China) Wu Yibing

The following players received entry into the singles main draw as alternates:

- (Tunisia) Malek Jaziri
- (Ecuador) Roberto Quiroz
- (Kazakhstan) Denis Yevseyev

The following players received entry from the qualifying draw:

- (Bulgaria) Adrian Andreev
- (United States) Martin Damm
- (Brazil) Gilbert Klier Júnior
- (Croatia) Matija Pecotić
- (Greece) Michail Pervolarakis
- (United States) Keegan Smith

== Champions ==
=== Singles ===
- (China) Wu Yibing def. (Australia) Jason Kubler 6–7^{(5–7)}, 6–4, 3–1 ret.

=== Doubles ===
- (South Korea) Chung Yun-seong / (Greece) Michail Pervolarakis def. (Tunisia) Malek Jaziri / (Japan) Kaichi Uchida 6–7^{(5–7)}, 7–6^{(7–3)}, [16–14].
