= 2021 Orlando Open – Doubles =

Doubles
- 2021 Orlando Open

Final
- Champions: (United States) Mitchell Krueger (United States) Jack Sock
- Runners-up: (United States) Christian Harrison (United States) Dennis Novikov
- Score: 4–6, 7–5, [13–11]

Events
Singles	Doubles
- Orlando Open

Andrey Golubev and Aleksandr Nedovyesov were the defending champions but chose not to defend their title.

Mitchell Krueger and Jack Sock won the title after defeating Christian Harrison and Dennis Novikov 4–6, 7–5, [13–11] in the final.

== Seeds ==
1. (Mexico) Miguel Ángel Reyes-Varela / (Brazil) Fernando Romboli (first round)
2. (United States) Evan King / (United States) Hunter Reese (first round)
3. (United States) Nathan Pasha / (United States) Max Schnur (first round)
4. (India) Sriram Balaji / (India) Jeevan Nedunchezhiyan (first round)

== Draw ==
Key

- Q = Qualifier
- WC = Wild card
- LL = Lucky loser
- Alt = Alternate
- ITF = ITF entry
- PR = Protected ranking
- SR = Special ranking
- SE = Special exempt
- JE = Junior exempt
- JR = Junior Accelerator Programme entrant
- CO = College Accelerator Programme entrant
- NG = Next Gen Accelerator Program entrant
- w/o = Walkover
- r = Retired
- d = Defaulted

First round
1	(Mexico) MÁ Reyes-Varela (Brazil) F Romboli	2	7	[6]
WC	(United States) C Harrison (United States) D Novikov	6	5	[10]
(United States) D Kudla (United States) T-S Kwiatkowski	6^{5}	2
PR	(India) Y Bhambri (Australia) M Ebden	7^{7}	6
3	(United States) N Pasha (United States) M Schnur	4	2
(Netherlands) J de Jong (Netherlands) S Verbeek	6	6
(United States) JC Aragone (Venezuela) LD Martínez	6^{5}	7	[10]
(United States) M McDonald (United States) Ma Redlicki	7^{7}	5	[6]
(United States) M Krueger (United States) J Sock	7^{8}	6
(Croatia) A Pavić (South Africa) R Roelofse	6^{6}	3
WC	(United States) A Ritschard (United States) A Rybakov	6^{4}	6	[18]
4	(India) S Balaji (India) J Nedunchezhiyan	7^{7}	4	[16]
(Brazil) J Menezes (Brazil) T Seyboth Wild	3	6	[10]
(United States) B Fratangelo (Chinese Taipei) J Jung	6	4	[5]
WC	(United States) S Bangoura (United States) JA Ore	6	6
2	(United States) E King (United States) H Reese	4	4

Quarterfinals
WC	(United States) C Harrison (United States) D Novikov	w/o
PR	(India) Y Bhambri (Australia) M Ebden
(Netherlands) J de Jong (Netherlands) S Verbeek	6	4	[8]
(United States) JC Aragone (Venezuela) LD Martínez	3	6	[10]
(United States) M Krueger (United States) J Sock	6	6
WC	(United States) A Ritschard (United States) A Rybakov	3	3
(Brazil) J Menezes (Brazil) T Seyboth Wild	6	3	[5]
WC	(United States) S Bangoura (United States) JA Ore	3	6	[10]

Semifinals
WC	(United States) C Harrison (United States) D Novikov	6	6
(United States) JC Aragone (Venezuela) LD Martínez	2	3
(United States) M Krueger (United States) J Sock	6	6
WC	(United States) S Bangoura (United States) JA Ore	4	3

Final
WC	(United States) C Harrison (United States) D Novikov	6	5	[11]
(United States) M Krueger (United States) J Sock	4	7	[13]
