= 2017 US Open – Men's singles =

Men's singles
- 2017 US Open

Final
- Champion: (Spain) Rafael Nadal
- Runner-up: (South Africa) Kevin Anderson
- Score: 6–3, 6–3, 6–4

Details
- Draw: 128 (16Q / 8WC)
- Seeds: 32

Events
Singles	men	women		boys	girls
Doubles	men	women	mixed	boys	girls
WC Singles	men	women	quad
WC Doubles	men	women	quad
Legends	men	women	mixed
- US Open

Rafael Nadal defeated Kevin Anderson in the final, 6–3, 6–3, 6–4 to win the men's singles tennis title at the 2017 US Open. It was his third US Open title and 16th major title overall. It was also his first hard court title since January 2014.

Stan Wawrinka was the reigning champion, but did not participate due to a knee injury that ended his season prematurely. Wawrinka's withdrawal ended his streak of 50 consecutive major appearances, dating back to the 2005 French Open. 2016 finalist Novak Djokovic also withdrew due to an elbow injury, ending his streak of 51 consecutive major appearances, dating back to the 2005 Australian Open. This was the first men's singles draw at the US Open since 1971 to include neither finalist from the previous year's tournament.

After the loss of Marin Čilić in the third round, a first-time major finalist was guaranteed from the bottom half of the draw. Anderson was the first South African man to reach the final since Cliff Drysdale in 1965, and at any major singles final since Kevin Curren at the 1984 Australian Open, as well as the lowest-ranked man to reach the US Open singles final since the ATP rankings began in 1973. Anderson supplanted 6’6” (1.98 m) Juan Martin del Potro and Marin Čilić who co-held the record for the tallest major finalist; Anderson stands at 6’8” (2.03 m).

Nadal, Roger Federer and Andy Murray were in contention for the world No. 1 singles ranking at the start of the tournament. Nadal retained the top ranking following Murray's withdrawal and Federer's loss in the quarterfinals.

Federer broke the men's singles record for total appearances at majors with his 71st participation. He was attempting to go undefeated at the majors for the season (having won the Australian Open and Wimbledon Championships and not played the French Open), but he lost to Juan Martín del Potro in the quarterfinals.

Andrey Rublev was the youngest man to reach the US Open quarterfinals since Andy Roddick in 2001, and Denis Shapovalov was the youngest to reach the fourth round since Michael Chang in 1989. Sam Querrey was the first American man to reach the quarterfinals since John Isner and Andy Roddick in 2011. Diego Schwartzman was the shortest man (5 feet 7 inches) to reach a major singles quarterfinal since Jaime Yzaga (also 5 feet 7 inches) at the 1994 US Open.

This tournament marked the first US Open main draw appearance of future world No. 1 and future champion Daniil Medvedev; he lost in the first round to Shapovalov.

== Seeds ==
1. (Spain) Rafael Nadal (champion)
2. (United Kingdom) ~~Andy Murray~~ (withdrew due to a hip injury)
3. (Switzerland) Roger Federer (quarterfinals)
4. (Germany) Alexander Zverev (second round)
5. (Croatia) Marin Čilić (third round)
6. (Austria) Dominic Thiem (fourth round)
7. (Bulgaria) Grigor Dimitrov (second round)
8. (France) Jo-Wilfried Tsonga (second round)
9. (Belgium) David Goffin (fourth round)
10. (United States) John Isner (third round)
11. (Spain) Roberto Bautista Agut (third round)
12. (Spain) Pablo Carreño Busta (semifinals)
13. (United States) Jack Sock (first round)
14. (Australia) Nick Kyrgios (first round)
15. (Czech Republic) Tomáš Berdych (second round)
16. (France) Lucas Pouille (fourth round)
17. (United States) Sam Querrey (quarterfinals)

18. (France) Gaël Monfils (third round, retired)
19. (Luxembourg) Gilles Müller (second round)
20. (Spain) Albert Ramos Viñolas (second round)
21. (Spain) David Ferrer (first round)
22. (Italy) Fabio Fognini (first round)
23. (Germany) Mischa Zverev (fourth round)
24. (Argentina) Juan Martín del Potro (semifinals)
25. (Russia) Karen Khachanov (first round)
26. (France) Richard Gasquet (first round)
27. (Uruguay) Pablo Cuevas (first round)
28. (South Africa) Kevin Anderson (final)
29. (Argentina) Diego Schwartzman (quarterfinals)
30. (France) Adrian Mannarino (third round)
31. (Spain) Feliciano López (third round)
32. (Netherlands) Robin Haase (first round)
33. (Germany) Philipp Kohlschreiber (fourth round)

Click on the seed number of a player to go to their draw section.

== Draw ==
Key

- Q = Qualifier
- WC = Wild card
- LL = Lucky loser
- Alt = Alternate
- ITF = ITF entry
- PR = Protected ranking
- SR = Special ranking
- SE = Special exempt
- JE = Junior exempt
- JR = Junior Accelerator Programme entrant
- CO = College Accelerator Programme entrant
- NG = Next Gen Accelerator Program entrant
- w/o = Walkover
- r = Retired
- d = Defaulted

=== Finals ===
Quarterfinals
1	(Spain) Rafael Nadal	6	6	6
(Russia) Andrey Rublev	1	2	2
3	(Switzerland) Roger Federer	5	6	6^{8}	4
24	(Argentina) Juan Martín del Potro	7	3	7^{10}	6
17	(United States) Sam Querrey	6^{5}	7^{11}	3	6^{7}
28	(South Africa) Kevin Anderson	7^{7}	6^{9}	6	7^{9}
12	(Spain) Pablo Carreño Busta	6	6	6
29	(Argentina) Diego Schwartzman	4	4	2

Semifinals
1	(Spain) Rafael Nadal	4	6	6	6
24	(Argentina) Juan Martín del Potro	6	0	3	2
28	(South Africa) Kevin Anderson	4	7	6	6
12	(Spain) Pablo Carreño Busta	6	5	3	4

Final
1	(Spain) Rafael Nadal	6	6	6
28	(South Africa) Kevin Anderson	3	3	4

=== Top half ===
==== Section 1 ====
First round
1	(Spain) R Nadal	7^{8}	6	6
(Serbia) D Lajović	6^{6}	2	2
(Japan) T Daniel	6	4	4	6	6
WC	(United States) T Paul	1	6	6	2	2
(Japan) Y Sugita	6	6	6
WC	(France) G Blancaneaux	2	2	0
LL	(Argentina) L Mayer	3	6	6	6
26	(France) R Gasquet	6	2	4	2
22	(Italy) F Fognini	4	6^{8}	6	0
Q	(Italy) S Travaglia	6	7^{10}	3	6
(Serbia) V Troicki	3	6	3	6	6
(Slovakia) N Gombos	6	3	6	4	3
(Germany) J-L Struff	6	3	2	6	3
(Ukraine) A Dolgopolov	3	6	6	1	6
(United States) R Harrison	4	2	6^{4}
15	(Czech Republic) T Berdych	6	6	7^{7}

Second round
1	(Spain) R Nadal	4	6	6	6
(Japan) T Daniel	6	3	2	2
(Japan) Y Sugita	7^{7}	4	3	4
LL	(Argentina) L Mayer	6^{3}	6	6	6
Q	(Italy) S Travaglia	6^{6}	5	0
(Serbia) V Troicki	7^{8}	7	6
(Ukraine) A Dolgopolov	3	6	7^{7}	6
15	(Czech Republic) T Berdych	6	1	6^{5}	2

Third round
1	(Spain) R Nadal	6^{3}	6	6	6
LL	(Argentina) L Mayer	7^{7}	3	1	4
(Serbia) V Troicki	1	0	4
(Ukraine) A Dolgopolov	6	6	6

Fourth round
1	(Spain) R Nadal	6	6	6
(Ukraine) A Dolgopolov	2	4	1

==== Section 2 ====
First round
9	(Belgium) D Goffin	6	2	6	6
(France) J Benneteau	4	6	4	2
(Belgium) S Darcis	1	2	0
(Argentina) G Pella	6	6	6
Q	(Germany) M Marterer	3	6	1	4
(United States) D Young	6	1	6	6
(France) J Chardy	6^{6}	3	4
18	(France) G Monfils	7^{8}	6	6
27	(Uruguay) P Cuevas	5	6^{3}	1
(Bosnia and Herzegovina) D Džumhur	7	7^{7}	6
Q	(Germany) C-M Stebe	5	6	6	6
(Argentina) N Kicker	7	3	1	1
(United Kingdom) A Bedene	1	4	4
(Russia) A Rublev	6	6	6
Q	(Czech Republic) V Šafránek	1	4	2
7	(Bulgaria) G Dimitrov	6	6	6

Second round
9	(Belgium) D Goffin	3	7^{7}	6^{2}	7^{7}	6
(Argentina) G Pella	6	6^{5}	7^{7}	6^{4}	3
(United States) D Young	3	7^{7}	4	6	5
18	(France) G Monfils	6	6^{3}	6	2	7
(Bosnia and Herzegovina) D Džumhur	4	6	6	6
Q	(Germany) C-M Stebe	6	4	0	1
(Russia) A Rublev	7	7^{7}	6
7	(Bulgaria) G Dimitrov	5	6^{3}	3

Third round
9	(Belgium) D Goffin	7	5
18	(France) G Monfils	5	1^{r}
(Bosnia and Herzegovina) D Džumhur	4	4	7	4
(Russia) A Rublev	6	6	5	6

Fourth round
9	(Belgium) D Goffin	5	6^{5}	3
(Russia) A Rublev	7	7^{7}	6

==== Section 3 ====
First round
3	(Switzerland) R Federer	4	6	6	1	6
(United States) F Tiafoe	6	2	1	6	4
(Slovenia) B Kavčič	3	7	4	3
(Russia) M Youzhny	6	5	6	6
(Spain) F Verdasco	6	0
(Canada) V Pospisil	2	0^{r}
(Russia) A Kuznetsov	4	6^{4}	7^{7}	2
31	(Spain) F López	6	7^{7}	6^{5}	6
33	(Germany) P Kohlschreiber	6	6	6
Q	(United States) T Smyczek	1	4	4
Q	(France) V Millot	1	0	6	6	4
(Colombia) S Giraldo	6	6	4	4	6
(Tunisia) M Jaziri	7^{7}	4	6	5	6
(Brazil) T Monteiro	6^{5}	6	3	7	4
PR	(Australia) J Millman	6	1	6	6
14	(Australia) N Kyrgios	3	6	4	1

Second round
3	(Switzerland) R Federer	6	6^{3}	4	6	6
(Russia) M Youzhny	1	7^{7}	6	4	2
(Spain) F Verdasco	3	2	6	1
31	(Spain) F López	6	6	3	6
33	(Germany) P Kohlschreiber	6	6	3
(Colombia) S Giraldo	2	1	0^{r}
(Tunisia) M Jaziri	1	6^{1}	1
PR	(Australia) J Millman	6	7^{7}	6

Third round
3	(Switzerland) R Federer	6	6	7
31	(Spain) F López	3	3	5
33	(Germany) P Kohlschreiber	7	6	6
PR	(Australia) J Millman	5	2	4

Fourth round
3	(Switzerland) R Federer	6	6	7
33	(Germany) P Kohlschreiber	4	2	5

==== Section 4 ====
First round
11	(Spain) R Bautista Agut	6	4	6	7^{7}
(Italy) A Seppi	2	6	2	6^{1}
(Germany) D Brown	6	6	6
(Brazil) T Bellucci	4	3	2
WC	(United States) P Kypson	4	6^{9}	1
Q	(Spain) A Menéndez-Maceiras	6	7^{11}	6
(Switzerland) H Laaksonen	4	6^{3}	6^{5}
24	(Argentina) JM del Potro	6	7^{7}	7^{7}
30	(France) A Mannarino	6	6	6
PR	(Lithuania) R Berankis	2	4	2
WC	(United States) B Fratangelo	7^{7}	6	3	7^{7}
(Croatia) I Karlović	6^{2}	4	6	6^{4}
(Cyprus) M Baghdatis	4	4	3
WC	(United States) T Fritz	6	6	6
WC	(Australia) A De Minaur	4	1	1
6	(Austria) D Thiem	6	6	6

Second round
11	(Spain) R Bautista Agut	6	6	7^{7}
(Germany) D Brown	1	3	6^{3}
Q	(Spain) A Menéndez-Maceiras	2	3	6^{3}
24	(Argentina) JM del Potro	6	6	7^{7}
30	(France) A Mannarino	6	6^{4}	6	6
WC	(United States) B Fratangelo	3	7^{7}	1	2
WC	(United States) T Fritz	4	4	6	5
6	(Austria) D Thiem	6	6	4	7

Third round
11	(Spain) R Bautista Agut	3	3	4
24	(Argentina) JM del Potro	6	6	6
30	(France) A Mannarino	5	3	4
6	(Austria) D Thiem	7	6	6

Fourth round
24	(Argentina) JM del Potro	1	2	6	7^{7}	6
6	(Austria) D Thiem	6	6	1	6^{1}	4

=== Bottom half ===
==== Section 5 ====
First round
17	(United States) S Querrey	6	6	6
(France) G Simon	4	3	4
WC	(United States) C Eubanks	2	4	2
(Israel) D Sela	6	6	6
Q	(Moldova) R Albot	7	4	6	6
(United States) E Escobedo	5	6	2	4
(Chinese Taipei) Y-h Lu	4	6	6	6
25	(Russia) K Khachanov	6	2	3	3
23	(Germany) M Zverev	7^{7}	4	4	7	6
WC	(United States) T-S Kwiatkowski	6^{5}	6	6	5	3
LL	(Slovakia) L Lacko	3	2	6^{5}
(France) B Paire	6	6	7^{7}
(Argentina) H Zeballos	6	6^{8}	4	3
(South Korea) H Chung	3	7^{10}	6	6
(France) P-H Herbert	1	3	6	3
10	(United States) J Isner	6	6	4	6

Second round
17	(United States) S Querrey	6	6	6
(Israel) D Sela	4	1	4
Q	(Moldova) R Albot	6	7^{9}	5	0	7^{7}
(Chinese Taipei) Y-h Lu	2	6^{7}	7	6	6^{2}
23	(Germany) M Zverev	6	6	3	6^{3}	7
(France) B Paire	3	2	6	7^{7}	5
(South Korea) H Chung	3	4	5
10	(United States) J Isner	6	6	7

Third round
17	(United States) S Querrey	4	6	6	6
Q	(Moldova) R Albot	6	2	4	4
23	(Germany) M Zverev	6	6	7^{7}
10	(United States) J Isner	4	3	6^{5}

Fourth round
17	(United States) S Querrey	6	6	6
23	(Germany) M Zverev	2	2	1

==== Section 6 ====
First round
13	(United States) J Sock	2	6^{12}	6	7	4
(Australia) J Thompson	6	7^{14}	1	5	6
Q	(Australia) J-P Smith	6^{5}	4	6	6^{4}
(Italy) T Fabbiano	7^{7}	6	3	7^{7}
(Portugal) J Sousa	6	3	6^{4}	2
(Italy) P Lorenzi	4	6	7^{7}	6
(Australia) B Tomic	6	3	4	4
19	(Luxembourg) G Müller	3	6	6	6
28	(South Africa) K Anderson	6	6	6
Q	(United States) JC Aragone	3	3	1
(Italy) A Giannessi	4	7^{7}	2	5
PR	(Latvia) E Gulbis	6	6^{3}	6	7
(Czech Republic) J Veselý	6^{5}	6^{2}	2
(Croatia) B Ćorić	7^{7}	7^{7}	6
Q	(Barbados) D King	6^{9}	5	4
4	(Germany) A Zverev	7^{11}	7	6

Second round
(Australia) J Thompson	6	2	6	4	2
(Italy) T Fabbiano	2	6	3	6	6
(Italy) P Lorenzi	6^{4}	6	7^{7}	6
19	(Luxembourg) G Müller	7^{7}	3	6^{4}	3
28	(South Africa) K Anderson	6	7	6
PR	(Latvia) E Gulbis	3	5	4
(Croatia) B Ćorić	3	7	7^{7}	7^{7}
4	(Germany) A Zverev	6	5	6^{1}	6^{4}

Third round
(Italy) T Fabbiano	2	4	4
(Italy) P Lorenzi	6	6	6
28	(South Africa) K Anderson	6	6	6
(Croatia) B Ćorić	4	3	2

Fourth round
(Italy) P Lorenzi	4	3	7^{7}	4
28	(South Africa) K Anderson	6	6	6^{4}	6

==== Section 7 ====
First round
8	(France) J-W Tsonga	6	6	6
(Romania) M Copil	3	3	4
Q	(Canada) D Shapovalov	7	6	6
(Russia) D Medvedev	5	1	2
(Spain) N Almagro	4	6^{2}	6^{5}
(United States) S Johnson	6	7^{7}	7^{7}
(United Kingdom) K Edmund	6	7	6
32	(Netherlands) R Haase	3	5	3
20	(Spain) A Ramos Viñolas	4	7^{7}	7	6^{3}	7
(Uzbekistan) D Istomin	6	6^{4}	5	7^{7}	5
(Hungary) M Fucsovics	3	6	4	6	6^{3}
Q	(France) N Mahut	6	2	6	2	7^{7}
PR	(Russia) D Tursunov	6^{7}	1	0^{r}
Q	(United Kingdom) C Norrie	7^{9}	6	0
Q	(United States) E King	3	2	6^{5}
12	(Spain) P Carreño Busta	6	6	7^{7}

Second round
8	(France) J-W Tsonga	4	4	6^{3}
Q	(Canada) D Shapovalov	6	6	7^{7}
(United States) S Johnson	5	2	6^{4}
(United Kingdom) K Edmund	7	6	7^{7}
20	(Spain) A Ramos Viñolas	6	4	6	3	0
Q	(France) N Mahut	4	6	4	6	6
Q	(United Kingdom) C Norrie	2	4	3
12	(Spain) P Carreño Busta	6	6	6

Third round
Q	(Canada) D Shapovalov	3	6	6	1
(United Kingdom) K Edmund	6	3	3	0^{r}
Q	(France) N Mahut	3	4	3
12	(Spain) P Carreño Busta	6	6	6

Fourth round
Q	(Canada) D Shapovalov	6^{2}	6^{4}	6^{3}
12	(Spain) P Carreño Busta	7^{7}	7^{7}	7^{7}

==== Section 8 ====
First round
16	(France) L Pouille	6	6	6
(Belgium) R Bemelmans	3	4	4
(United States) J Donaldson	6	4	6	7^{8}
(Georgia (country)) N Basilashvili	0	6	3	6^{6}
PR	(Austria) A Haider-Maurer	6^{3}	1^{r}
(Russia) E Donskoy	7^{7}	5
Q	(Kazakhstan) M Kukushkin	4	6	6	6
21	(Spain) D Ferrer	6	3	2	1
29	(Argentina) D Schwartzman	6	6	6
(Argentina) C Berlocq	2	1	3
PR	(Australia) T Kokkinakis	7^{7}	6	1	6^{2}	3
(Serbia) J Tipsarević	6^{5}	3	6	7^{7}	6
(Brazil) R Dutra Silva	5	6	3	4
(Germany) F Mayer	7	0	6	6
(United States) T Sandgren	4	3	6	3
5	(Croatia) M Čilić	6	6	3	6

Second round
16	(France) L Pouille	7	6	4	3	6
(United States) J Donaldson	5	4	6	6	4
(Russia) E Donskoy	4	4	5
Q	(Kazakhstan) M Kukushkin	6	6	7
29	(Argentina) D Schwartzman	6	6	7
(Serbia) J Tipsarević	2	4	5
(Germany) F Mayer	3	3	3
5	(Croatia) M Čilić	6	6	6

Third round
16	(France) L Pouille	2	6	6	6
Q	(Kazakhstan) M Kukushkin	6	3	4	4
29	(Argentina) D Schwartzman	4	7	7	6
5	(Croatia) M Čilić	6	5	5	4

Fourth round
16	(France) L Pouille	6^{3}	5	6	2
29	(Argentina) D Schwartzman	7^{7}	7	2	6

== Seeded players ==
The following are the seeded players. Seeds are based on the rankings as of August 21, 2017. Rank and points before are as of August 28, 2017.

Seed	Rank	Player	Points before	Points defending	Points won	Points after	Status
1	1	(Spain) Rafael Nadal	7,645	180	2,000	9,465	Champion, defeated (South Africa) Kevin Anderson [28]
~~2~~	~~2~~	~~(United Kingdom) Andy Murray~~	7,150	360	0	6,790	Withdrew due to hip injury
3	3	(Switzerland) Roger Federer	7,145	0	360	7,505	Quarterfinals lost to (Argentina) Juan Martín del Potro [24]
4	6	(Germany) Alexander Zverev	4,470	45	45	4,470	Second round lost to (Croatia) Borna Ćorić
5	7	(Croatia) Marin Čilić	4,155	90	90	4,155	Third round lost to (Argentina) Diego Schwartzman [29]
6	8	(Austria) Dominic Thiem	4,030	180	180	4,030	Fourth round lost to (Argentina) Juan Martín del Potro [24]
7	9	(Bulgaria) Grigor Dimitrov	3,710	180	45	3,575	Second round lost to (Russia) Andrey Rublev
8	12	(France) Jo-Wilfried Tsonga	2,690	360	45	2,375	Second round lost to (Canada) Denis Shapovalov [Q]
9	14	(Belgium) David Goffin	2,525	10	180	2,695	Fourth round lost to (Russia) Andrey Rublev
10	15	(United States) John Isner	2,425	90	90	2,425	Third round lost to (Germany) Mischa Zverev [23]
11	13	(Spain) Roberto Bautista Agut	2,525	90	90	2,525	Third round lost to (Argentina) Juan Martín del Potro [24]
12	19	(Spain) Pablo Carreño Busta	2,225	90	720	2,855	Semifinals lost to (South Africa) Kevin Anderson [28]
13	16	(United States) Jack Sock	2,345	180	10	2,175	First round lost to (Australia) Jordan Thompson
14	17	(Australia) Nick Kyrgios	2,325	90	10	2,245	First round lost to (Australia) John Millman [PR]
15	18	(Czech Republic) Tomáš Berdych	2,310	0	45	2,355	Second round lost to (Ukraine) Alexandr Dolgopolov
16	20	(France) Lucas Pouille	2,210	360	180	2,030	Fourth round lost to (Argentina) Diego Schwartzman [29]
17	21	(United States) Sam Querrey	2,095	10	360	2,445	Quarterfinals lost to (South Africa) Kevin Anderson [28]
18	22	(France) Gaël Monfils	1,915	720	90	1,285	Third round retired against (Belgium) David Goffin [9]
19	23	(Luxembourg) Gilles Müller	1,885	10	45	1,920	Second round lost to (Italy) Paolo Lorenzi
20	24	(Spain) Albert Ramos Viñolas	1,815	45	45	1,815	Second round lost to (France) Nicolas Mahut [Q]
21	25	(Spain) David Ferrer	1,695	90	10	1,615	First round lost to vs. (Kazakhstan) Mikhail Kukushkin [Q]
22	26	(Italy) Fabio Fognini	1,580	45	10	1,545	First round lost to (Italy) Stefano Travaglia [Q]
23	27	(Germany) Mischa Zverev	1,484	70	180	1,594	Fourth round lost to (United States) Sam Querrey [17]
24	28	(Argentina) Juan Martín del Potro	1,460	360	720	1,820	Semifinals lost to (Spain) Rafael Nadal [1]
25	29	(Russia) Karen Khachanov	1,390	70	10	1,330	First round lost to (Chinese Taipei) Lu Yen-hsun
26	30	(France) Richard Gasquet	1,390	10	10	1,390	First round lost to (Argentina) Leonardo Mayer [LL]
27	31	(Uruguay) Pablo Cuevas	1,360	45	10	1,325	First round lost to (Bosnia and Herzegovina) Damir Džumhur
28	32	(South Africa) Kevin Anderson	1,360	90	1,200	2,470	Runner-up, lost to (Spain) Rafael Nadal [1]
29	33	(Argentina) Diego Schwartzman	1,280	10+90	360+45	1,585	Quarterfinals lost to (Spain) Pablo Carreño Busta [12]
30	34	(France) Adrian Mannarino	1,255	10	90	1,335	Third round lost to (Austria) Dominic Thiem [6]
31	35	(Spain) Feliciano López	1,250	45	90	1,295	Third round lost to (Switzerland) Roger Federer [3]
32	36	(Netherlands) Robin Haase	1,168	10+48	10+45	1,165	First round lost to (United Kingdom) Kyle Edmund
33	37	(Germany) Philipp Kohlschreiber	1,135	10	180	1,305	Fourth round lost to (Switzerland) Roger Federer [3]

=== Withdrawn players ===
The following players would have been seeded, but withdrew before the tournament began.

Rank	Player	Points before	Points defending	Points after	Withdrawal reason
4	(Switzerland) Stan Wawrinka	5,690	2,000	3,690	Knee injury
5	(Serbia) Novak Djokovic	5,325	1,200	4,125	Elbow injury
10	(Japan) Kei Nishikori	3,195	720	2,475	Wrist injury
11	(Canada) Milos Raonic	2,870	45	2,825	Wrist injury

== Other entry information ==
=== Wild cards ===
- (France) Geoffrey Blancaneaux
- (Australia) Alex De Minaur
- (United States) Christopher Eubanks
- (United States) Bjorn Fratangelo
- (United States) Taylor Fritz
- (United States) Thai-Son Kwiatkowski (Note: Winner of the men's singles tournament in the 2017 NCAA Division I Tennis Championships)
- (United States) Patrick Kypson (Note: Winner of the Kalamazoo Wild Card tournament)
- (United States) Tommy Paul (Note: Winner of the Men's USTA Wild Card Challenge held in Binghamton, New York, Lexington, Kentucky and Aptos, California)

=== Protected ranking ===
- (Austria) Andreas Haider-Maurer (63)
- (Australia) Thanasi Kokkinakis (81)
- (Australia) John Millman (81)
- (Russia) Dmitry Tursunov (89)
- (Lithuania) Ričardas Berankis (92)
- (Latvia) Ernests Gulbis (99)

=== Qualifiers ===
- (Moldova) Radu Albot
- (United States) JC Aragone
- (Barbados) Darian King
- (United States) Evan King
- (Kazakhstan) Mikhail Kukushkin
- (France) Nicolas Mahut
- (Germany) Maximilian Marterer
- (Spain) Adrián Menéndez-Maceiras
- (France) Vincent Millot
- (United Kingdom) Cameron Norrie
- (Czech Republic) Václav Šafránek
- (Canada) Denis Shapovalov
- (Australia) John-Patrick Smith
- (United States) Tim Smyczek
- (Germany) Cedrik-Marcel Stebe
- (Italy) Stefano Travaglia

=== Lucky losers ===
- (Slovakia) Lukáš Lacko
- (Argentina) Leonardo Mayer

=== Withdrawals ===
- ‡ (United Kingdom) Dan Evans (60) → replaced by (Latvia) Ernests Gulbis (99 PR)
- ‡ (Serbia) Novak Djokovic (4) → replaced by (Switzerland) Henri Laaksonen (100)
- ‡ (Japan) Yoshihito Nishioka (90) → replaced by (United States) Tennys Sandgren (101)
- ‡ (Switzerland) Stan Wawrinka (5) → replaced by (Germany) Florian Mayer (102)
- ‡ (Japan) Kei Nishikori (8) → replaced by (Brazil) Thiago Monteiro (103)
- ‡ (Argentina) Federico Delbonis (84) → replaced by (Italy) Alessandro Giannessi (104) (Note: Last direct acceptance)
- @ (Canada) Milos Raonic (9) → replaced by (Argentina) Leonardo Mayer (LL)
- § (United Kingdom) Andy Murray (1) → replaced by (Slovakia) Lukáš Lacko (LL)

‡ – withdrew from entry list before qualifying began
@ – withdrew from entry list after qualifying began
§ – withdrew from main draw

=== Retirements ===
- (United Kingdom) Kyle Edmund
- (Colombia) Santiago Giraldo
- (Austria) Andreas Haider-Maurer
- (France) Gaël Monfils
- (Canada) Vasek Pospisil
- (Russia) Dmitry Tursunov

== Notes ==
Preceded by 2017 Wimbledon Championships – Men's singles	Grand Slam men's singles	Succeeded by 2018 Australian Open – Men's singles
