= Michail Pervolarakis =

Greek tennis player (born 1996)

- Country (sports): Greece (2018–present); Cyprus (–2018)
- Residence: Limassol, Cyprus
- Born: 6 June 1996 (age 30) Limassol, Cyprus
- Height: 1.93 m (6 ft 4 in)
- Turned pro: 2018
- Plays: Right-handed (two-handed backhand)
- College: University of Portland
- Prize money: $215,235

Singles
- Career record: 5–11 (at ATP Tour level, Grand Slam level, and in Davis Cup)
- Career titles: 0
- Highest ranking: No. 366 (10 January 2022)

Doubles
- Career record: 1–6 (at ATP Tour level, Grand Slam level, and in Davis Cup)
- Career titles: 0
- Highest ranking: No. 157 (14 November 2022)

Michail Pervolarakis (Greek: Μιχαήλ Περβολαράκης, born 6 June 1996) is a Cypriot-born Greek tennis player.

Pervolarakis has a career high ATP singles ranking of World No. 366 achieved on 10 January 2022 and a career high ATP doubles ranking of World No. 157 achieved on 14 November 2022.

Pervolarakis represents Greece at the Davis Cup, where he has a W/L record of 3–3.

== College career ==
Pervolarakis played college tennis at the University of Portland, winning WCC player of the year in 2017 and 2018.

== Professional career ==
He made his ATP debut at the 2022 Winston-Salem Open as a lucky loser.

== Tour finals ==
=== Singles 6 (3–3) ===
Legend ATP Challenger (0–0) ITF Futures (3–3)	Finals by surface Hard (3–3) Clay (0–0) Grass (0–0) Carpet (0–0)

Result	W–L	Date	Tournament	Tier	Surface	Opponent	Score
Loss	0–1	Jul 2018	Malaysia F3 Kuala Lumpur	Future	Hard	(Poland) Maciej Smola	3–6, 6–3, 3–6
Win	1–1	May 2019	M15 Heraklion, Greece	World Tennis Tour	Hard	(United States) Henry Craig	6–2, 7–5
Win	2–1	Jun 2019	M15 Heraklion, Greece	World Tennis Tour	Hard	(United Kingdom) Aidan McHugh	6–1, 6–4
Loss	2–2	Sep 2021	M25 Johannesburg, South Africa	World Tennis Tour	Hard	(United Kingdom) Alastair Gray	6–4, 3–6, 2–6
Loss	2–3	Nov 2021	M25 Afula, Israel	World Tennis Tour	Hard	(Japan) Naoki Nakagawa	6–4, 4–6, 3–6
Win	3–3	May 2022	M15 Cancún, Mexico	World Tennis Tour	Hard	(China) Haoyuan Huang	6–3, 6–4

=== Doubles 17 (11–6) ===
Legend ATP Challenger (3–3) ITF Futures (8–3)	Finals by surface Hard (11–6) Clay (0–0) Grass (0–0) Carpet (0–0)

Result	W–L	Date	Tournament	Tier	Surface	Partner	Opponents	Score
Win	1–0	Sep 2018	Canada F7 Toronto	Future	Hard	(Italy) Francesco Ferrari	(United States) Felix Corwin (Japan) Takuto Niki	6–3, 6–3
Win	2–0	Nov 2018	Greece F6 Heraklion	Future	Hard	(Italy) Francesco Ferrari	(France) Baptiste Crepatte (Monaco) Lucas Catarina	7–6^{(7–4)}, 6–0
Win	3–0	Nov 2018	Greece F7 Heraklion	Future	Hard	(Italy) Francesco Ferrari	(Czech Republic) Vit Kopriva (Austria) David Pichler	6–3, 6–3
Win	4–0	Mar 2019	M15 Arcadia, United States	World Tennis Tour	Hard	(Slovenia) Matic Spec	(Sweden) Karl Friberg (Sweden) Simon Freund	6–4, 6–3
Loss	4–1	Apr 2019	M25 Abuja, Nigeria	World Tennis Tour	Hard	(France) Dan Added	(France) Sadio Doumbia (France) Fabien Reboul	4–6, 7–5, [6–10]
Win	5–1	Apr 2019	M25 Abuja, Nigeria	World Tennis Tour	Hard	(France) Dan Added	(India) Arjun Kadhe (India) Vijay Sundar Prashanth	6–4, 6–4
Loss	5–2	May 2019	M15 Heraklion, Greece	World Tennis Tour	Hard	(Greece) Petros Tsitsipas	(United Kingdom) Lloyd Glasspool (United Kingdom) Aidan McHugh	6–7^{(5–7)}, 6–7^{(2–7)}
Win	6–2	Jun 2019	M15 Akko, Israel	World Tennis Tour	Hard	(Greece) Markos Kalovelonis	(Republic of Ireland) Julian Bradley (France) Florian Lakat	6–7^{(9–11)}, 6–4, [10–6]
Win	7–2	Jun 2021	M25 Tulsa, United States	World Tennis Tour	Hard	(United States) Strong Kirchheimer	(United States) JC Aragone (Colombia) Nicolás Barrientos	6–1, 4–6, [10–7]
Loss	7–3	Jul 2021	Cary, United States	Challenger	Hard	(Cyprus) Petros Chrysochos	(United States) Christian Harrison (United States) Dennis Novikov	3–6, 3–6
Loss	7–4	Sep 2021	M25 Johannesburg, South Africa	World Tennis Tour	Hard	(Greece) Markos Kalovelonis	(South Africa) Alec Beckley (South Africa) Vaughn Hunter	1–6, 6–7^{(5–7)}
Loss	7–5	Nov 2021	Manama, United States	Challenger	Hard	(Austria) Maximilian Neuchrist	(Portugal) Nuno Borges (Portugal) Francisco Cabral	5–7, 7–6^{(7–5)}, [8–10]
Win	8–5	Feb 2022	M25 Cancún, Mexico	World Tennis Tour	Hard	(France) Geoffrey Blancaneaux	(Bolivia) Boris Arias (Bolivia) Federico Zeballos	6–2, 4–6, [11–9]
Win	9–5	Jun 2023	Orlando, United States	Challenger	Hard	(South Korea) Yunseong Chung	(Tunisia) Malek Jaziri (Japan) Kaichi Uchida	6–7^{(5–7)}, 7–6^{(7–3)}, [16–14]
Win	10–5	Nov 2022	Calgary, Canada	Challenger	Hard	(Austria) Maximilian Neuchrist	(Italy) Julian Ocleppo (Germany) Kai Wehnelt	6–4, 6–4
Loss	10–6	Apr 2023	León, Mexico	Challenger	Hard	(Austria) Maximilian Neuchrist	(Tunisia) Aziz Dougaz (France) Antoine Escoffier	6–7^{(5–7)}, 6–3, [5–10]
Win	11–6	Apr 2023	Morelos, Mexico	Challenger	Hard	(Tunisia) Skander Mansouri	(Zimbabwe) Benjamin Lock (New Zealand) Rubin Statham	6–4, 6–4

== Personal life ==
Pervolarakis has a wife, Amelia, and a daughter, Eleonora.
