= Sam Riffice =

American tennis player

- Country (sports): United States
- Residence: Orlando, Florida
- Born: 1 March 1999 (age 27) Sacramento, California
- Height: 1.88 m (6 ft 2 in)
- Plays: Right-handed (two-handed backhand)
- College: University of Florida
- Coach: Tanner Stump
- Prize money: US $128,047

Singles
- Career record: 0–1
- Career titles: 0
- Highest ranking: No. 487 (October 17, 2022)

Grand Slam singles results
- US Open: 1R (2021)

Doubles
- Career record: 0–0
- Career titles: 0
- Highest ranking: No. 606 (May 27, 2019)

Sam Riffice (born 1 March 1999) is an American tennis player. He has a career high ATP singles ranking of world No. 487 achieved on October 17, 2022 and a career high doubles ranking of No. 606 achieved on May 27, 2019.

== Early life and career ==
His mother, Lori Riffice, is a national coach with USTA Player Development. The family relocated to Central Florida to be a part of the USTA National Campus staff when it first opened in January 2017.

Whilst studying at the University of Florida Riffice won the 2021 SEC championship. Riffice then won the 2021 NCAA Singles Tournament at the USTA National Campus where as the No. 6-seed Riffice defeated No. 2-seeded Daniel Rodrigues of South Carolina by a score of 3–6, 6–1, 6–4 in the final. He was also captain of the Florida Gators as they won the 2021 NCAA team title.

== Career ==
Riffice was given his ATP tour debut as a wildcard at the 2021 US Open, where he lost in the first round to 15th seed Grigor Dimitrov.

== Personal life ==
Riffice graduated from University of Florida in 2022 with a degree in political science. He is currently enrolled in University of Florida's Levin College of Law. He was named to the Intercollegiate Tennis Association Board of Directors as a Special Advisor in July 2025.

== ATP Challenger and ITF Futures finals ==
=== Singles: 6 (2–4) ===
Legend ATP Challenger (0–0) ITF Futures (2–4)	Finals by surface Hard (2–2) Clay (0–2) Grass (0–0) Carpet (0–0)

Result	W–L	Date	Tournament	Tier	Surface	Opponent	Score
Loss	0–1	Apr 2017	USA F15, Vero Beach	Futures	Clay	(France) Calvin Hemery	3–6, 1–6
Loss	0–2	May 2017	Romania F1, Bucharest	Futures	Clay	(Romania) Nicolae Frunză	3–6, 3–6
Loss	0–3	Jun 2018	USA F17, Tulsa	Futures	Hard	(Switzerland) Marc-Andrea Hüsler	4–6, 2–6
Win	1–3	Jun 2019	M25 Wichita, USA	World Tennis Tour	Hard	(United States) Brandon Holt	6–1, 6–4
Loss	1–4	Jun 2019	M25 Tulsa, USA	World Tennis Tour	Hard	(United States) Maxime Cressy	3–6, 1–6
Win	2–4	Sep 2022	M15 Fayetteville, USA	World Tennis Tour	Hard	(United Kingdom) Blu Baker	5–1 ret.
