= JC Aragone =

American tennis player

- Full name: Juan Cruz Aragone
- Country (sports): United States
- Residence: Yorba Linda, California
- Born: June 28, 1995 (age 30) Buenos Aires, Argentina
- Height: 5 ft 10 in (1.78 m)
- Turned pro: 2017
- Plays: Right-handed (two-handed backhand)
- College: University of Virginia
- Prize money: $284,679

Singles
- Career record: 0–4
- Career titles: 0
- Highest ranking: No. 224 (December 17, 2018)

Grand Slam singles results
- Australian Open: Q1 (2019)
- US Open: 1R (2017)

Doubles
- Career record: 0–0
- Career titles: 0
- Highest ranking: No. 153 (September 30, 2019)
- Last updated on: July 29, 2024.

Juan Cruz "JC" Aragone (born June 28, 1995) is an American former professional tennis player. He attended the University of Virginia and was a member of three NCAA Men's Tennis Championship winning teams. Aragone made his first ATP main-draw appearance at the 2017 US Open after coming through qualifying.

== Early life and amateur career ==
Aragone is from Yorba Linda, California and took classes through the Parkview School, an independent study school based in Placentia, California. In January 2012, Aragone was hospitalized due to liver and kidney failure after developing an allergic reaction to an acne medication. That same year, he was diagnosed with type 1 diabetes. Despite these challenges, Aragone finished his junior career competing in two junior US Opens and ranked 14th in his graduating class. He committed to playing college tennis at the University of Virginia.

While at Virginia, Aragone helped the Cavaliers win three straight NCAA Men's Tennis Championships. He was named to the NCAA All-Tournament team twice, in both singles and doubles, and was a two-time ACC Tournament MVP. Aragone finished his college career with a 109–22 record.

== Professional career ==
Aragone was awarded a wild card into the 2017 US Open qualifying tournament. He defeated Marco Cecchinato, Riccardo Bellotti, and Akira Santillan to secure a spot in the main draw of the 2017 US Open, where he lost to 28th seed Kevin Anderson.

== Personal life ==
JC's parents are Paula and Facundo Aragone. He has one brother named Tommy. Aragone majored in government while at Virginia. He also interned at J.P. Morgan in New York City during the summer of 2016, balancing urban tennis practice with the demands of a Wall Street job. He received an offer to return to the company full-time, but opted instead to pursue his dream of a professional career in tennis.

== ATP Challenger and ITF Futures/World Tennis Tour finals ==
=== Singles: 5 (3–2) ===
Legend (singles) ATP Challenger Tour (0–0) ITF Futures/World Tennis Tour (3–2)	Titles by surface Hard (3–2) Clay (0–0) Grass (0–0) Carpet (0–0)

Result	W–L	Date	Tournament	Tier	Surface	Opponent	Score
Loss	0–1	Dec 2016	USA F40, Tallahassee	Futures	Hard (i)	(Canada) Brayden Schnur	5–7, 6–3, 2–6
Loss	0–2	Jun 2017	Spain F17, Martos	Futures	Hard	(Spain) Carlos Gómez-Herrera	5–7, 6–4, 5–7
Win	1–2	Mar 2018	USA F8, Calabasas	Futures	Hard	(United States) Marcos Giron	6–2, 6–4
Win	2–2	Jul 2018	Canada F4, Kelowna	Futures	Hard	(Canada) Alexis Galarneau	6–2, 6–3
Win	3–2	Feb 2022	M25 Cancún, Mexico	World Tennis Tour	Hard	(Germany) Lucas Gerch	6–1, 6–3

=== Doubles: 15 (6–9) ===
Legend (doubles) ATP Challenger Tour (3–6) ITF Futures Tour (3–3)	Titles by surface Hard (5–9) Clay (1–0) Grass (0–0) Carpet (0–0)

Result	W–L	Date	Tournament	Tier	Surface	Partner	Opponents	Score
Loss	0–1	Jun 2017	Spain F17, Martos	Futures	Hard	(Australia) Daniel Nolan	(United States) Robert Galloway (United States) Evan King	4–6, 4–6
Loss	0–2	Mar 2018	Canada F1, Gatineau	Futures	Hard (i)	(United States) Deiton Baughman	(France) Florian Lakat (United States) Ronnie Schneider	6–2, 6–7^{(6–8)}, [7–10]
Win	1–2	Jun 2018	USA F15, Winston-Salem	Futures	Hard	(United States) Harrison Adams	(United States) Ian Dempster (Germany) Christian Seraphim	7–5, 6–7^{(4–7)}, [10–3]
Loss	1–3	Jul 2018	Granby, Canada	Challenger	Hard	(United Kingdom) Liam Broady	(United States) Alex Lawson (China) Li Zhe	6–7^{(2–7)}, 3–6
Win	2–3	Mar 2019	Indian Wells, USA	Challenger	Hard	(United States) Marcos Giron	(Barbados) Darian King (United States) Hunter Reese	6–4, 6–4
Win	3–3	Jul 2019	Winnetka, USA	Challenger	Hard	(United States) Bradley Klahn	(United States) Christopher Eubanks (United States) Thai-Son Kwiatkowski	7–5, 6–4
Loss	3–4	Jul 2019	Binghamton, USA	Challenger	Hard	(United States) Alex Lawson	(Australia) Max Purcell (Australia) Luke Saville	4–6, 6–4, [5–10]
Loss	3–5	Sep 2019	Tiburon, USA	Challenger	Hard	(Barbados) Darian King	(United States) Robert Galloway (Venezuela) Roberto Maytín	2–6, 5–7
Win	4–5	May 2021	M25 Pensacola, USA	World Tennis Tour	Clay	(Colombia) Nicolás Barrientos	(Colombia) Alejandro Gómez (United States) Junior A. Ore	6–2, 4–6, [10–6]
Loss	4–6	Jun 2021	Orlando, USA	Challenger	Hard	(Colombia) Nicolás Barrientos	(United States) Christian Harrison (Canada) Peter Polansky	2–6, 3–6
Loss	4–7	Jun 2021	M25 Tulsa, USA	World Tennis Tour	Hard	(Colombia) Nicolás Barrientos	(United States) Strong Kirchheimer (Greece) Michail Pervolarakis	1–6, 6–4, [7–10]
Loss	4–8	Jul 2021	El Espinar, Spain	Challenger	Hard	(Colombia) Nicolás Barrientos	(United States) Robert Galloway (United States) Alex Lawson	6–7^{(8–10)}, 4–6
Win	5–8	Feb 2022	M25 Cancún, Mexico	World Tennis Tour	Hard	(Canada) Peter Polansky	(Bolivia) Boris Arias (Bolivia) Federico Zeballos	6–2, 6–4
Loss	5–9	Apr 2022	Salinas, Ecuador	Challenger	Hard	(Ecuador) Roberto Quiroz	(India) Yuki Bhambri (India) Saketh Myneni	6–4, 3–6, [7–10]
Win	6–9	Apr 2022	Cuernavaca, Mexico	Challenger	Hard	(Spain) Adrián Menéndez Maceiras	(Colombia) Nicolás Mejía (Ecuador) Roberto Quiroz	7–6^{(7–4)}, 6–2
