= Orlando Open =

- 2022 Orlando Open

ATP Challenger Tour
- Event name: Orlando Open
- Location: Orlando, Florida, United States
- Venue: USTA National Campus
- Category: ATP Challenger Tour
- Surface: Hard
- Draw: 48S/4Q/16D
- Prize money: $54,160

The Orlando Open is a professional tennis tournament played on hard courts. It is currently part of the ATP Challenger Tour. It is held annually in Orlando, Florida, United States since 2019.

== Past finals ==
=== Singles ===
Year	Champion	Runner-up	Score
2022	(China) Wu Yibing	(Australia) Jason Kubler	6–7^{(5–7)}, 6–4, 3–1 ret.
2021 (2)	(United States) Christopher Eubanks	(Colombia) Nicolás Mejía	2–6, 7–6^{(7–3)}, 6–4
2021 (1)	(United States) Jenson Brooksby	(United States) Denis Kudla	6–3, 6–3
2020	(United States) Brandon Nakashima	(India) Prajnesh Gunneswaran	6–3, 6–4
2019	(United States) Marcos Giron	(Barbados) Darian King	6–4, 6–4

=== Doubles ===
Year	Champions	Runners-up	Score
2022	(South Korea) Chung Yun-seong (Greece) Michail Pervolarakis	(Tunisia) Malek Jaziri (Japan) Kaichi Uchida	6–7^{(5–7)}, 7–6^{(7–3)}, [16–14]
2021 (2)	(United States) Christian Harrison (Canada) Peter Polansky	(United States) JC Aragone (Colombia) Nicolás Barrientos	6–2, 6–3
2021 (1)	(United States) Mitchell Krueger (United States) Jack Sock	(United States) Christian Harrison (United States) Dennis Novikov	4–6, 7–5, [13–11]
2020	(Kazakhstan) Andrey Golubev (Kazakhstan) Aleksandr Nedovyesov	(United States) Mitchell Krueger (United States) Jackson Withrow	7–5, 6–4
2019	(Monaco) Romain Arneodo (Belarus) Andrei Vasilevski	(Portugal) Gonçalo Oliveira (Italy) Andrea Vavassori	7–6^{(7–2)}, 2–6, [15–13]
