= Christian Harrison =

American tennis player (born 1994)

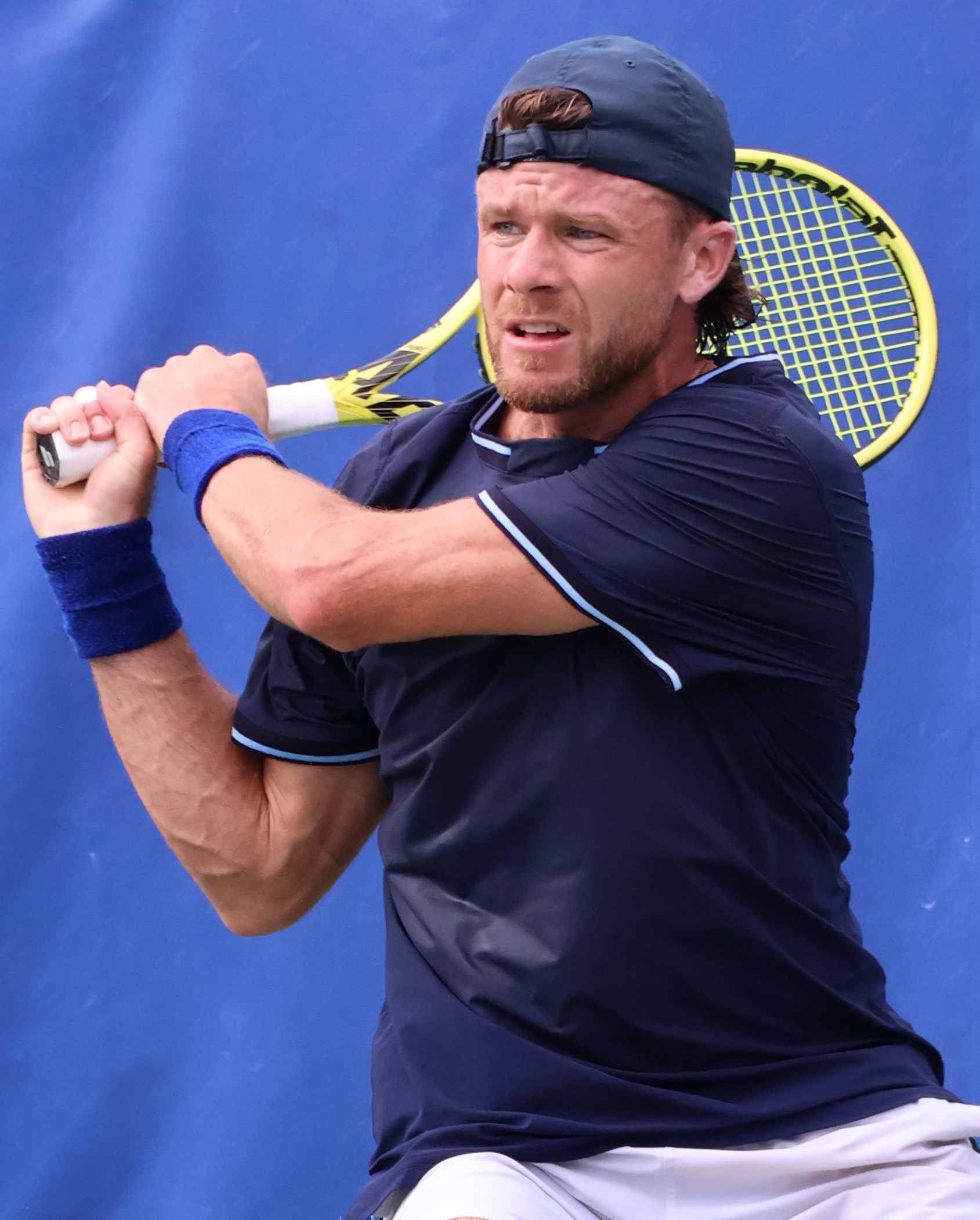
- Harrison at the 2023 Cary Challenger II
- Country (sports): United States
- Residence: Bradenton, Florida, US
- Born: May 29, 1994 (age 32) Shreveport, Louisiana, US
- Height: 5 ft 11 in (1.80 m)
- Turned pro: 2007
- Plays: Right-handed (double-handed backhand)
- Coach: Pat Harrison
- Prize money: US $2,860,134

Singles
- Career record: 6–9
- Career titles: 0
- Highest ranking: No. 198 (July 2, 2018)

Grand Slam singles results
- Australian Open: Q2 (2018)
- Wimbledon: 2R (2022)
- US Open: 1R (2016)

Doubles
- Career record: 91–66
- Career titles: 5
- Highest ranking: No. 3 (November 16, 2026)
- Current ranking: No. 3 (November 16, 2026)

Grand Slam doubles results
- Australian Open: W (2026)
- French Open: SF (2025)
- Wimbledon: 3R (2026)
- US Open: W (2026)

Other doubles tournaments
- Tour Finals: RR (2025)

Grand Slam mixed doubles results
- Australian Open: QF (2026)
- French Open: 2R (2025, 2026)
- Wimbledon: SF (2026)
- US Open: SF (2018, 2025)
- Last updated on: November 16, 2026.

Christian Harrison (born May 29, 1994) is an American professional tennis player who specializes in doubles. He has a career-high ATP doubles ranking of world No. 3 achieved on November 16, 2026 and a singles ranking of No. 198, reached on July 2, 2018.

Harrison has won five ATP Tour doubles titles, the most significant being major trophies at the 2026 Australian Open and 2026 US Open, playing alongside Neal Skupski. He also reached the semifinals at the 2025 French Open, with compatriot Evan King. In mixed doubles, he reached two semifinals in the 2018 and 2025 editions of the US Open, with Christina McHale and Danielle Collins, respectively.

Harrison represents the United States at the Davis Cup.

== Early life ==
Christian was coached by his father, Pat Harrison, and attended the IMG Academy in Bradenton, Florida. He is the younger brother of Ryan Harrison.

== Professional career ==
=== 2012: Grand Slam doubles debut and quarterfinal ===
In July, Christian made it to the quarterfinals of the Lexington, Kentucky Challenger event. Christian was awarded a wildcard into the 2012 US Open to play doubles alongside Ryan Harrison, where they reached the quarterfinals.

=== 2013: First ATP Tour win ===
Earlier in the year he reached the quarterfinals, semifinals, the final, and won, respectively, the four Futures events in which he participated. He failed to qualify in Indian Wells, losing in the first round of qualifying to Ernests Gulbis, who made a deep run to the fourth round after qualifying. However, he did take a set off Gulbis.

Harrison won his first ATP World Tour match against Alejandro Falla at the BB&T Atlanta Open. He then lost in the next round to John Isner in three tight sets.

=== 2014–15: Hiatus ===
Harrison spent 2014 and 2015 recovering from several surgeries.

=== 2016–2018: Grand Slam and Masters 1000 debuts ===
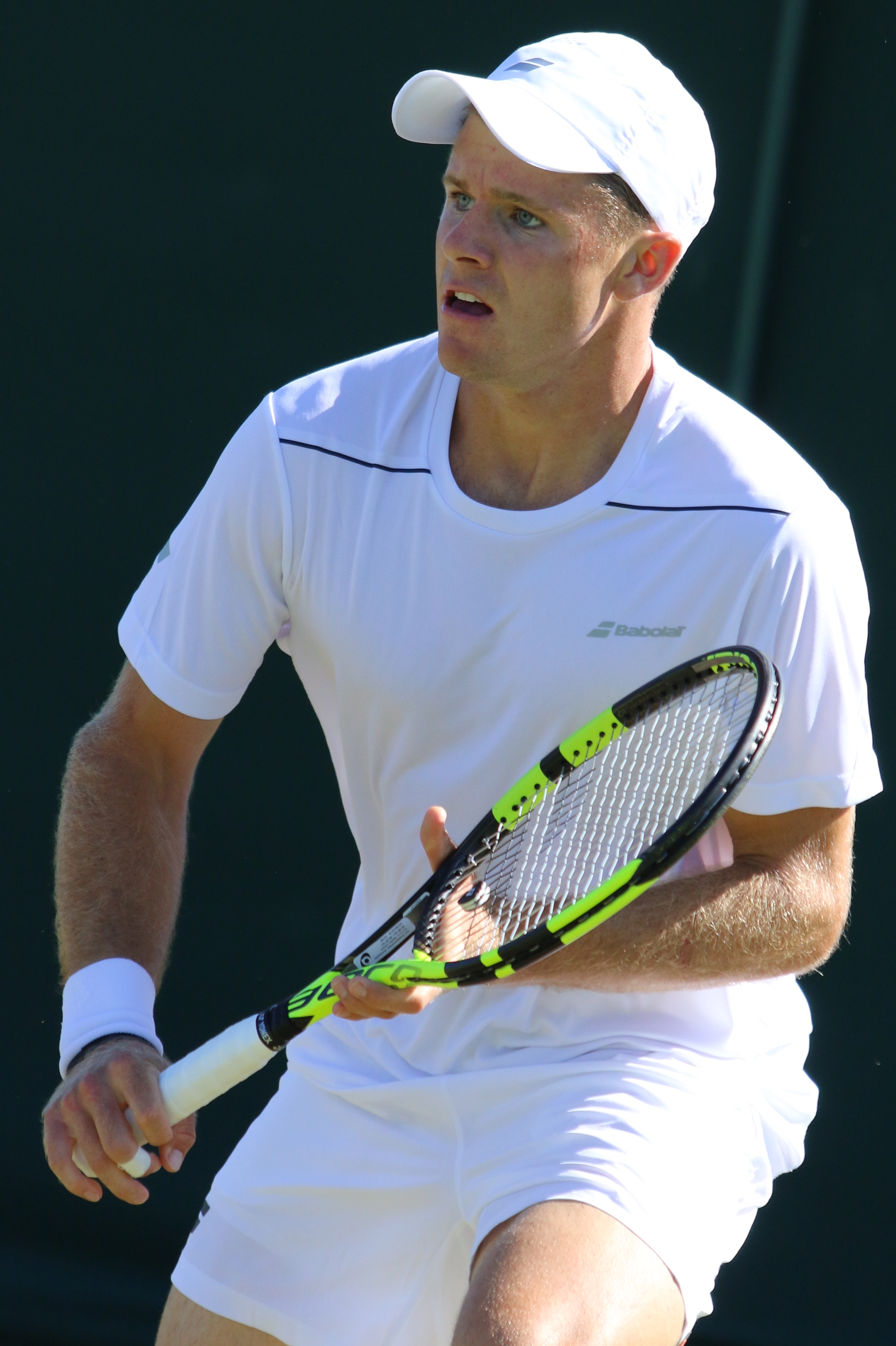
Harrison at the 2018 Wimbledon Championships Qualifying

Harrison reached the final round of qualifying at the 2016 US Open after beating Luke Saville and second seed Konstantin Kravchuk in two three-set matches. He made it into main draw after beating Steven Diez also in three-set match. He was one set down at all three matches in qualifying. He lost in the first round to Paul-Henri Mathieu in straight sets.

He made his Masters 1000 singles debut at the 2017 Miami Open as a qualifier but lost to Dudi Sela in the first round. He received a wildcard to the 2017 US Open where he won his first round match in doubles with partner Christopher Eubanks.

=== 2021: Maiden ATP doubles final ===
Harrison qualified for the 2021 Delray Beach Open, starting the week ranked No. 789 in the world. He beat number 1 seed Cristian Garín and advanced all the way to the semifinals, where he was defeated by fourth seed Hubert Hurkacz, who would later win the title. As a result, he climbed 444 positions in the rankings to a World No. 345 ranking on 18 January 2021 and he got five ATP Tour match victories thus far, with three of them in Delray Beach, where he also won two matches in qualifying. He also reached his maiden ATP final in doubles with his brother Ryan Harrison where they lost to Ariel Behar and Gonzalo Escobar. As a result, he returned to the top 250 in the doubles rankings at World No. 229.

=== 2022: First Wimbledon qualification since 2018 and win ===
He qualified for only the second time at the 2022 Wimbledon Championships and his third Major main draw and won his first match at any Major, defeating wildcard Jay Clarke.

=== 2024–25: Doubles success: New partnership, first title, Masters semifinals, top 20 ===
Harrison won his 11th Challenger title in Winnipeg with Cannon Kingsley and fourth of the season, and reached the top 100 in the doubles rankings on 15 July 2024.

Partnering with Rajeev Ram, Harrison reached the doubles final at the 2025 Auckland Classic, but withdrew before the match against Nikola Mektić and Michael Venus due to Ram suffering an arm injury.

Alongside Evan King, he won his first ATP Tour doubles title at the 2025 Dallas Open, defeating Ariel Behar and Robert Galloway in the final. Within three weeks they lifted their second title, also an ATP 500 in Acapulco, having qualified for the main draw. They defeated fourth seeds Sadio Doumbia and Fabien Reboul 6–4, 6–0 in a 56-minute final. At the 2025 BNP Paribas Open the pair reached their first Masters semifinal as wildcards with wins over Matthew Ebden and John Peers and seventh-seeded Argentines Maximo Gonzalez and Andres Molteni. As a result Harrison reached a new career-high ranking of world No. 36 on 17 March 2025. At the next Masters in Miami, the pair reached back-to-back quarterfinals upsetting third seeds Simone Bolelli and Andrea Vavassori and as a result he reached the top 30 in the rankings. The pair reached another semifinal at the 2025 Mutua Madrid Open but again lost, this time to the world No. 1 pair Marcelo Arevalo and Mate Pavic. As a result they both reached new career-high rankings in the top 20 in the rankings on 5 May 2025.

In October, Harrison and King defeated Hugo Nys and Édouard Roger-Vasselin in the final to win the European Open in Brussels.

=== 2026: Australian and US Open doubles titles ===
Seeded sixth, and playing just their second tournament together, Harrison and new partner Neal Skupski won the Australian Open, defeating wildcard entrants Jason Kubler and Marc Polmans in the final. In September, they defeated Kevin Krawietz and Tim Pütz in the final to win the US Open.. Two months later, Harrison and Skupski reached the final at the Paris Masters but lost to wildcard pairing Quentin Halys and Pierre-Hugues Herbert. Seeded second at the ATP Finals, they made it through to the semifinals, at which point they lost to Marcelo Arévalo and Mate Pavić.

== Performance timeline ==
Key
W	F	SF	QF	#R	RR	Q#	DNQ	A	NH

(W) winner; (F) finalist; (SF) semifinalist; (QF) quarterfinalist; (#R) rounds 4, 3, 2, 1; (RR) round-robin stage; (Q#) qualification round; (DNQ) did not qualify; (A) absent; (NH) not held; (SR) strike rate (events won / competed); (W–L) win–loss record.
To avoid confusion and double counting, these charts are updated at the conclusion of a tournament or when the player's participation has ended.

=== Doubles ===
Current through the 2026 US Open.

Tournament	2012	2013	2014	2015	2016	2017	2018	2019	2020	2021	2022	2023	2024	2025	2026	SR	W–L	Win %
Grand Slam tournaments
Australian Open	A	A	A	A	A	A	A	A	A	A	A	A	A	1R	W	1 / 2	6–1	86%
French Open	A	A	A	A	A	A	A	A	A	A	A	A	A	SF	2R	0 / 2	5–2	71%
Wimbledon	A	A	A	A	A	A	A	A	NH	A	A	A	A	1R	3R	0 / 2	2–2	50%
US Open	QF	A	A	A	A	2R	3R	A	2R	A	A	A	1R	1R	W	1 / 7	13–6	68%
Win–loss	3–1	0–0	0–0	0–0	0–0	1–1	2–1	0–0	1–1	0–0	0–0	0–0	0–1	4–4	15–2	2 / 13	26–11	70%
Year-end championship
ATP Finals	Did not qualify													RR		0 / 1	0–3	0%
ATP Masters 1000
Indian Wells Masters	A	A	A	A	A	A	A	A	NH	A	A	A	A	SF	QF	0 / 2	5–2	71%
Miami Open	A	1R	A	A	A	A	A	A	NH	A	A	A	A	QF	QF	0 / 3	4–3	57%
Monte Carlo Masters	A	A	A	A	A	A	A	A	NH	A	A	A	A	1R	QF	0 / 2	0–2	0%
Madrid Open	A	A	A	A	A	A	A	A	NH	A	A	A	A	SF	2R	0 / 2	4–2	67%
Italian Open	A	A	A	A	A	A	A	A	A	A	A	A	A	QF	SF	0 / 2	5–2	67%
Canadian Open	A	A	A	A	A	A	A	A	NH	A	A	A	A	1R	1R	0 / 2	0–2	0%
Cincinnati Masters	A	A	A	A	A	A	A	A	A	A	A	A	A	QF	1R	0 / 2	2–2	67%
Shanghai Masters	A	A	A	A	A	A	A	A	NH			A	A	2R		0 / 1	1–1	50%
Paris Masters	A	A	A	A	A	A	A	A	A	A	A	A	A	1R		0 / 1	0–1	0%
Win–loss	0–0	0–1	0–0	0–0	0–0	0–0	0–0	0–0	0–0	0–0	0–0	0–0	0–0	13–9		0 / 10	13–10	57%
Career statistics
Titles	0	0	0	0	0	0	0	0	0	0	0	0	0	3		3		
Finals	0	0	0	0	0	0	0	0	0	1	0	0	0	5		6		
Overall win–loss	3–1	0–3	0–0	1–1	0–0	1–1	2–1	0–0	2–2	3–1	0–0	0–2	1–5	39–29		52–46		
Year-end ranking	174	731	—	855	—	542	229	882	293	185	259	148	84	15				

== Grand Slam tournaments finals ==
=== Doubles: 2 (2 titles) ===
Result	Year	Tournament	Surface	Partner	Opponents	Score
Win	2026	Australian Open	Hard	(United Kingdom) Neal Skupski	(Australia) Jason Kubler (Australia) Marc Polmans	7–6^{(7–4)}, 6–4
Win	2026	US Open	Hard	(United Kingdom) Neal Skupski	(Germany) Kevin Krawietz (Germany) Tim Pütz	6–4, 7–6^{(8–6)}

== ATP 1000 tournaments finals ==
=== Doubles: 1 (runner-up) ===
Result	Year	Tournament	Surface	Partner	Opponents	Score
Loss	2026	Paris Masters	Hard (i)	(United Kingdom) Neal Skupski	(France) Quentin Halys (France) Pierre-Hugues Herbert	6–7^{(3–7)}, 7–6^{(7–4)}, [8–10]

== ATP Tour finals ==
=== Doubles: 9 (5 titles, 4 runner-ups) ===
Legend Grand Slam (2–0) ATP Finals (–) ATP 1000 (0–1) ATP 500 (2–0) ATP 250 (1–3)	Finals by surface Hard (5–4) Clay (–) Grass (–)	Finals by setting Outdoor (3–3) Indoor (2–1)

Result	W–L	Date	Tournament	Tier	Surface	Partner	Opponents	Score
Loss	0–1	Jan 2021	Delray Beach Open, US	ATP 250	Hard	(United States) Ryan Harrison	(Uruguay) Ariel Behar (Ecuador) Gonzalo Escobar	7–6^{(7–5)}, 6–7^{(4–7)}, [4–10]
Loss	0–2	Jan 2025	Auckland Open, New Zealand	ATP 250	Hard	(United States) Rajeev Ram	(Croatia) Nikola Mektić (New Zealand) Michael Venus	walkover
Win	1–2	Feb 2025	Dallas Open, US	ATP 500	Hard (i)	(United States) Evan King	(Uruguay) Ariel Behar (United States) Robert Galloway	7–6^{(7–4)}, 7–6^{(7–4)}
Loss	1–3	Feb 2025	Delray Beach Open, US	ATP 250	Hard	(United States) Evan King	(Serbia) Miomir Kecmanović (United States) Brandon Nakashima	6–7^{(3–7)}, 6–1, [3–10]
Win	2–3	Feb 2025	Mexican Open, Mexico	ATP 500	Hard	(United States) Evan King	(France) Sadio Doumbia (France) Fabien Reboul	6–4, 6–0
Win	3–3	Oct 2025	European Open, Belgium	ATP 250	Hard (i)	(United States) Evan King	(Monaco) Hugo Nys (France) Édouard Roger-Vasselin	7–6^{(12–10)}, 7–6^{(7–5)}
Win	4–3	Jan 2026	Australian Open, Melbourne, Australia	Grand Slam	Hard	(United Kingdom) Neal Skupski	(Australia) Jason Kubler (Australia) Marc Polmans	7–6^{(7–4)}, 6–4
Win	5–3	Sep 2026	US Open, New York City, US	Grand Slam	Hard	(United Kingdom) Neal Skupski	(Germany) Kevin Krawietz (Germany) Tim Pütz	6–4, 7–6^{(8–6)}
Loss	5–4	Nov 2026	Paris Masters, France	ATP 1000	Hard (i)	(United Kingdom) Neal Skupski	(France) Quentin Halys (France) Pierre-Hugues Herbert	6–7^{(3–7)}, 7–6^{(7–4)}, [8–10]

== ATP Challenger and ITF Tour Finals ==
=== Singles: 10 (5 titles, 5 runner-ups) ===
Legend ATP Challenger (0–2) ITF Futures/WTT (5–3)	Finals by surface Hard (4–1) Clay (1–4)

Result	W–L	Date	Tournament	Tier	Surface	Opponent	Score
Loss	0–1	May 2018	Savannah Challenger, US	Challenger	Clay	(Bolivia) Hugo Dellien	1–6, 6–1, 4–6
Loss	0–2	Apr 2022	Savannah Challenger, US	Challenger	Clay	(United States) Jack Sock	4–6, 1–6

Result	W–L	Date	Tournament	Tier	Surface	Opponent	Score
Loss	0–1	Jan 2013	Great Britain F2, Preston	Futures	Hard (i)	(United Kingdom) Edward Corrie	6–2, 3–6, 5–7
Win	1–1	Feb 2013	Great Britain F3, Sheffield	Futures	Hard (i)	(United Kingdom) Edward Corrie	6–4, 2–6, 7–6^{(7–5)}
Loss	1–2	May 2013	US F13, Tampa	Futures	Clay	(United States) Austin Krajicek	walkover
Win	2–2	Aug 2016	US F27, Champaign	Futures	Hard	(United States) Rhyne Williams	6–7^{(2–7)}, 6–3, 6–4
Win	3–2	Jul 2017	US F21, Tulsa	Futures	Hard	(United States) Tommy Paul	3–6, 6–2, 6–1
Win	4–2	Jul 2017	US F23, Wichita	Futures	Hard	(United States) Michael Mmoh	1–6, 6–2, 7–5
Loss	4–3	Feb 2021	M25 Naples, US	WTT	Clay	(France) Clément Tabur	1–6, 6–1, 3–6
Win	5–3	Feb 2021	M25 Naples, US	WTT	Clay	(France) Corentin Denolly	6–4, 6–2

=== Doubles: 20 (13 titles, 7 runner-ups) ===
Legend ATP Challenger (13–6) ITF WTT (0–1)	Finals by surface Hard (11–3) Clay (2–3) Grass (0–1)

Result	W–L	Date	Tournament	Tier	Surface	Partner	Opponents	Score
Loss	0–1	Jun 2013	Franken Challenger, Germany	Challenger	Clay	(New Zealand) Michael Venus	(Australia) Colin Ebelthite (Australia) Rameez Junaid	4–6, 5–7
Loss	0–2	Apr 2018	Sarasota Open, US	Challenger	Clay	(Canada) Peter Polansky	(United States) Evan King (United States) Hunter Reese	1–6, 2–6
Loss	0–3	Apr 2021	Orlando Open, US	Challenger	Hard	(United States) Dennis Novikov	(United States) Jack Sock (United States) Mitchell Krueger	6–4, 5–7, [11–13]
Win	1–3	Jun 2021	Orlando Open, US	Challenger	Hard	(Canada) Peter Polansky	(United States) JC Aragone (Colombia) Nicolás Barrientos	6–2, 6–3
Win	2–3	Jul 2021	Cary Challenger, US	Challenger	Hard	(United States) Dennis Novikov	(Cyprus) Petros Chrysochos (Greece) Michail Pervolarakis	6–3, 6–3
Win	3–3	Apr 2022	Tallahassee Tennis Challenger, US	Challenger	Clay	(Netherlands) Gijs Brouwer	(Ecuador) Diego Hidalgo (Colombia) Cristian Rodríguez	4–6, 7–5, [10–6]
Win	4–3	May 2022	Little Rock Challenger, US	Challenger	Hard	(Australia) Andrew Harris	(United States) Robert Galloway (United States) Max Schnur	6–3, 6–4
Win	5–3	Feb 2023	Tenerife Challenger, Spain	Challenger	Hard	(Japan) Shintaro Mochizuki	(Italy) Francesco Passaro (Italy) Matteo Gigante	6–4, 6–3
Win	6–3	Feb 2023	Tenerife Challenger III, Spain	Challenger	Hard	(Australia) Andrew Harris	(United Kingdom) Luke Johnson (Netherlands) Sem Verbeek	7–6^{(8–6)}, 6–7^{(4–7)}, [10–8]
Win	7–3	Jul 2023	Championnats de Granby, Canada	Challenger	Hard	(Latvia) Miķelis Lībietis	(Australia) Tristan Schoolkate (Australia) Adam Walton	6–4, 6–3
Win	8–3	Feb 2024	Teréga Open Pau–Pyrénées, France	Challenger	Hard (i)	(United States) Brandon Nakashima	(Monaco) Romain Arneodo (Austria) Sam Weissborn	7–6^{(7–5)}, 6–4
Win	9–3	Feb 2024	Play In Challenger, France	Challenger	Hard (i)	(United Kingdom) Marcus Willis	(France) Titouan Droguet (France) Giovanni Mpetshi Perricard	7–6^{(8–6)}, 6–3
Win	10–3	Apr 2024	Savannah Challenger, US	Challenger	Clay	(United Kingdom) Marcus Willis	(Sweden) Simon Freund (Denmark) Johannes Ingildsen	6–3, 6–3
Loss	10–4	June 2024	Ilkley Trophy, UK	Challenger	Grass	(France) Fabrice Martin	(United States) Evan King (United States) Reese Stalder	3–6, 6–3, [6–10]
Win	11–4	Jul 2024	Winnipeg Challenger, Canada	Challenger	Hard	(United States) Cannon Kingsley	(Japan) Yuta Shimizu (Japan) Kaichi Uchida	6–1, 6–4
Loss	11–5	Sep 2024	Columbus Challenger, US	Challenger	Hard (i)	(United States) Ethan Quinn	(Mexico) Hans Hach Verdugo (Japan) James Trotter	4–6, 7–6^{(8–6)}, [9–11]
Win	12–5	Sep 2024	Internationaux de Tennis de Vendée, France	Challenger	Hard (i)	(Brazil) Marcelo Demoliner	(Denmark) August Holmgren (Denmark) Johannes Ingildsen	6–3, 7–5
Loss	12–6	Nov 2024	Torneio Internacional Masculino de Tênis, Brazil	Challenger	Hard	(United States) Evan King	(Argentina) Federico Agustín Gómez (Venezuela) Luis David Martínez	6–7^{(4–7)}, 5–7
Win	13–6	Nov 2024	Challenger Temuco, Chile	Challenger	Hard	(United States) Evan King	(Zimbabwe) Benjamin Lock (Argentina) Renzo Olivo	7–6^{(7–5)}, 7–5

Result	W–L	Date	Tournament	Tier	Surface	Partner	Opponents	Score
Loss	0–1	Oct 2020	M25 Pardubice, Czech Republic	WTT	Clay	(United States) Toby Kodat	(Uruguay) Martín Cuevas (Argentina) Agustín Velotti	6–3, 3–6, [6–10]

== World TeamTennis ==
Christian has played three seasons with World TeamTennis, making his debut in 2015 with the Boston Lobsters as a substitute. He has since served as a substitute for the Orange County Breakers in 2018 and the San Diego Aviators during the 2020 WTT season played at The Greenbrier.
