= 2018 Cary Challenger – Singles =

Singles
- 2018 Cary Challenger

Final
- Champion: (Australia) James Duckworth
- Runner-up: (United States) Reilly Opelka
- Score: 7–6^{(7–4)}, 6–3

Events
Singles	Doubles
← 2017 ·	Cary Challenger	· 2019 →

Kevin King was the defending champion but lost in the first round to James Duckworth.

Duckworth won the title after defeating Reilly Opelka 7–6^{(7–4)}, 6–3 in the final.

== Seeds ==
1. (Canada) Peter Polansky (first round)
2. (Sweden) Elias Ymer (first round)
3. (El Salvador) Marcelo Arévalo (second round)
4. (United States) Reilly Opelka (final)
5. (United States) Bjorn Fratangelo (semifinals)
6. (United States) Kevin King (first round)
7. (Australia) Alexei Popyrin (second round)
8. (Australia) Maverick Banes (first round)

== Draw ==
=== Key ===
- Q = Qualifier
- WC = Wild card
- LL = Lucky loser
- Alt = Alternate
- SE = Special exempt
- PR = Protected ranking
- ITF = ITF entry
- JE = Junior exempt
- w/o = Walkover
- r = Retired
- d = Defaulted
- SR = Special ranking

=== Finals ===
Semifinals
5	(United States) Bjorn Fratangelo	3	4
Q	(Australia) James Duckworth	6	6
4	(United States) Reilly Opelka	6	6
(Japan) Kaichi Uchida	3	4

Final
Q	(Australia) James Duckworth	7^{7}	6
4	(United States) Reilly Opelka	6^{4}	3

=== Top half ===
First round
1	(Canada) P Polansky	3	4
(Colombia) A González	6	6
(Sweden) M Ymer	6	2	7^{7}
(Spain) D Pérez Sanz	2	6	6^{2}
(United States) M Krueger	3	7^{7}	3
(United States) C Eubanks	6	6^{3}	6
WC	(Canada) A Galarneau	4	3
5	(United States) B Fratangelo	6	6
3	(El Salvador) M Arévalo	6	6
Q	(United States) J. J. Wolf	3	3
WC	(United States) S Korda	6^{3}	4
Q	(Belgium) J De Loore	7^{7}	6
Q	(United States) Evan Song	6	6
WC	(United States) Nick Stachowiak	3	2
Q	(Australia) J Duckworth	4	6	6
6	(United States) K King	6	4	3

Second round
(Colombia) A González	4	6	6
(Sweden) M Ymer	6	3	4
(United States) C Eubanks	4	4
5	(United States) B Fratangelo	6	6
3	(El Salvador) M Arévalo	6^{3}	5
Q	(Belgium) J De Loore	7^{7}	7
Q	(United States) E Song	3	6^{4}
Q	(Australia) J Duckworth	6	7^{7}

Quarterfinals
(Colombia) A González	7^{7}	5	4
5	(United States) B Fratangelo	6^{5}	7	6
Q	(Belgium) J De Loore	3	6^{3}
Q	(Australia) J Duckworth	6	7^{7}

Semifinals
5	(United States) B Fratangelo	3	4
Q	(Australia) J Duckworth	6	6

=== Bottom half ===
First round
7	(Australia) A Popyrin	6	6
(United States) JC Aragone	3	4
(Spain) R Ortega Olmedo	6	5	1
(Germany) D Köpfer	3	7	6
(Germany) J Choinski	7^{7}	2	1
(United States) D Young	6^{4}	6	6
(United States) E Escobedo	6^{11}	4
4	(United States) R Opelka	7^{13}	6
8	(Australia) M Banes	2	6	3
(United States) E King	6	1	6
(Dominican Republic) R Cid Subervi	3	1
(Japan) K Uchida	6	6
WC	(United States) W Blumberg	6^{5}	6	0
(Australia) A Harris	7^{7}	3	0^{r}
(Dominican Republic) J Hernández-Fernández	6	6
2	(Sweden) E Ymer	3	4

Second round
7	(Australia) A Popyrin	7^{7}	6^{5}	6^{3}
(Germany) D Köpfer	6^{5}	7^{7}	7^{7}
(United States) D Young	1	6^{5}
4	(United States) R Opelka	6	7^{7}
(United States) E King	4	3
(Japan) K Uchida	6	6
WC	(United States) W Blumberg	4	3
(Dominican Republic) J Hernández-Fernández	6	6

Quarterfinals
(Germany) D Köpfer	6^{4}	4
4	(United States) R Opelka	7^{7}	6
(Japan) K Uchida	6	6
(Dominican Republic) J Hernández-Fernández	4	3

Semifinals
4	(United States) R Opelka	6	6
(Japan) K Uchida	3	4
