= 2020 Cary Challenger – Singles =

Singles
- 2020 Cary Challenger

Final
- Champion: (United States) Denis Kudla
- Runner-up: (India) Prajnesh Gunneswaran
- Score: 3–6, 6–3, 6–0

Events
Singles	Doubles
← 2019 ·	Cary Challenger	· 2021 →

Andreas Seppi was the defending champion but chose not to defend his title.

Denis Kudla won the title after defeating Prajnesh Gunneswaran 3–6, 6–3, 6–0 in the final.

== Seeds ==
1. (Brazil) Thiago Monteiro (second round)
2. (United States) Denis Kudla (champion)
3. (Colombia) Daniel Elahi Galán (semifinals)
4. (India) Prajnesh Gunneswaran (final)
5. (Egypt) Mohamed Safwat (first round)
6. (United States) Michael Mmoh (second round, withdrew)
7. (Kazakhstan) Dmitry Popko (quarterfinals)
8. (United States) Mackenzie McDonald (first round)

== Draw ==
Key

- Q = Qualifier
- WC = Wild card
- LL = Lucky loser
- Alt = Alternate
- ITF = ITF entry
- PR = Protected ranking
- SR = Special ranking
- SE = Special exempt
- JE = Junior exempt
- JR = Junior Accelerator Programme entrant
- CO = College Accelerator Programme entrant
- NG = Next Gen Accelerator Program entrant
- w/o = Walkover
- r = Retired
- d = Defaulted

=== Finals ===
Semifinals
(Denmark) Mikael Torpegaard
4	(India) Prajnesh Gunneswaran	w/o
3	(Colombia) Daniel Elahi Galán	7^{8}	1	4
2	(United States) Denis Kudla	6^{6}	6	6

Final
4	(India) Prajnesh Gunneswaran	6	3	0
2	(United States) Denis Kudla	3	6	6

=== Top half ===
First round
1	(Brazil) T Monteiro	7^{7}	3
(Brazil) G Clezar	6^{5}	2^{r}
(Denmark) M Torpegaard	3	6	6
WC	(United States) W Blumberg	6	3	4
(United States) T-S Kwiatkowski	6	4	5
(United States) B Nakashima	4	6	7
WC	(Canada) A Galarneau	6	4	6
8	(United States) M McDonald	2	6	1
4	(India) P Gunneswaran	6	6
(Canada) P Polansky	2	2
(United States) B Fratangelo	6^{11}	3
(United States) J Sock	7^{13}	6
(India) R Ramanathan	6	4	1
(Russia) T Gabashvili	3	6	6
Q	(Brazil) T Bellucci	6^{4}	6	7^{9}
5	(Egypt) M Safwat	7^{7}	1	6^{7}

Second round
1	(Brazil) T Monteiro	6	3	4
(Denmark) M Torpegaard	4	6	6
(United States) B Nakashima	6	6
WC	(Canada) A Galarneau	3	2
4	(India) P Gunneswaran	6^{3}	6	7^{7}
(United States) J Sock	7^{7}	2	6^{5}
(Russia) T Gabashvili	3	6^{7}
Q	(Brazil) T Bellucci	6	7^{9}

Quarterfinals
(Denmark) M Torpegaard	6	3	7
(United States) B Nakashima	2	6	5
4	(India) P Gunneswaran	3	7	7^{7}
Q	(Brazil) T Bellucci	6	5	6^{5}

Semifinals
(Denmark) M Torpegaard
4	(India) P Gunneswaran	w/o

=== Bottom half ===
First round
6	(United States) M Mmoh	7	6
Q	(Kazakhstan) A Nedovyesov	5	0
(United States) C Eubanks	7	7
Q	(United States) C Harrison	5	5
(Japan) H Moriya	6^{5}	1
(Chinese Taipei) T-l Wu	7^{7}	6
(Dominican Republic) R Cid Subervi	6^{5}	1
3	(Colombia) DE Galán	7^{7}	6
7	(Kazakhstan) D Popko	6	6
(United States) U Blanch	3	2
(Sweden) E Ymer	1	2
(United States) M Krueger	6	6
(United States) N Rubin	6	3	5
WC	(United States) G Johns	4	6	7
Q	(United States) K King	2	1
2	(United States) D Kudla	6	6

Second round
6	(United States) M Mmoh
(United States) C Eubanks	w/o
(Chinese Taipei) T-l Wu	3	3
3	(Colombia) DE Galán	6	6
7	(Kazakhstan) D Popko	6	3	6
(United States) M Krueger	3	6	3
WC	(United States) G Johns	2	1
2	(United States) D Kudla	6	6

Quarterfinals
(United States) C Eubanks	4	4
3	(Colombia) DE Galán	6	6
7	(Kazakhstan) D Popko	4	1
2	(United States) D Kudla	6	6

Semifinals
3	(Colombia) DE Galán	7^{8}	1	4
2	(United States) D Kudla	6^{6}	6	6
