= 2020 Cary Challenger =

- Date: 9–15 November
- Edition: 6th
- Surface: Hard
- Location: Cary, United States

Champions

Singles
- (United States) Denis Kudla

Doubles
- (Russia) Teymuraz Gabashvili / (United States) Dennis Novikov
← 2019 ·	Cary Challenger	· 2021 →

The 2020 Cary Challenger was a professional tennis tournament played on hard courts. It was the 6th edition of the tournament which was part of the 2020 ATP Challenger Tour. It took place in Cary, North Carolina, United States between 9 and 15 November 2020.

== Singles main-draw entrants ==
=== Seeds ===
Country	Player	Rank^{1}	Seed
BRA	Thiago Monteiro	80	1
USA	Denis Kudla	122	2
COL	Daniel Elahi Galán	131	3
IND	Prajnesh Gunneswaran	146	4
EGY	Mohamed Safwat	155	5
USA	Michael Mmoh	172	6
KAZ	Dmitry Popko	173	7
USA	Mackenzie McDonald	191	8

- ^{1} Rankings are as of November 2, 2020.

=== Other entrants ===
The following players received wildcards into the singles main draw:

- (United States) William Blumberg
- (Canada) Alexis Galarneau
- (United States) Garrett Johns

The following players received entry from the qualifying draw:

- (Brazil) Thomaz Bellucci
- (United States) Christian Harrison
- (United States) Kevin King
- (Kazakhstan) Aleksandr Nedovyesov

== Champions ==
=== Singles ===
- (United States) Denis Kudla def. (India) Prajnesh Gunneswaran 3–6, 6–3, 6–0.

=== Doubles ===
- (Russia) Teymuraz Gabashvili / (United States) Dennis Novikov def. (United Kingdom) Luke Bambridge / (United States) Nathaniel Lammons 7–5, 4–6, [10–8].
