= 2018 Cary Challenger – Doubles =

Doubles
- 2018 Cary Challenger

Final
- Champions: (United States) Evan King (United States) Hunter Reese
- Runners-up: (France) Fabrice Martin (France) Hugo Nys
- Score: 6–4, 7–6^{(8–6)}

Events
Singles	Doubles
← 2017 ·	Cary Challenger	· 2019 →

Marcelo Arévalo and Miguel Ángel Reyes-Varela were the defending champions but only Arévalo chose to defend his title, partnering Roberto Maytín. Arévalo lost in the first round to Luis David Martínez and David Pérez Sanz.

Evan King and Hunter Reese won the title after defeating Fabrice Martin and Hugo Nys 6–4, 7–6^{(8–6)} in the final.

== Seeds ==
1. (France) Fabrice Martin / (France) Hugo Nys (final)
2. (El Salvador) Marcelo Arévalo / (Venezuela) Roberto Maytín (first round)
3. (Canada) Peter Polansky / (United States) Jackson Withrow (quarterfinals)
4. (Japan) Toshihide Matsui / (Denmark) Frederik Nielsen (semifinals)

== Draw ==
=== Key ===
- Q = Qualifier
- WC = Wild card
- LL = Lucky loser
- Alt = Alternate
- SE = Special exempt
- PR = Protected ranking
- ITF = ITF entry
- JE = Junior exempt
- w/o = Walkover
- r = Retired
- d = Defaulted
- SR = Special ranking

First round
1	(France) F Martin (France) H Nys	6	6
Q	(Spain) R Ortega Olmedo (Spain) Pablo Vivero González	3	2
WC	(United States) Catalin Mateas (United States) Nick Stachowiak	6^{5}	5
(Mexico) H Hach Verdugo (Sweden) A Siljeström	7^{7}	7
3	(Canada) P Polansky (United States) J Withrow	7	6
(Philippines) R Gonzales (United States) N Lammons	5	2
(United States) K King (South Africa) R Roelofse	5	1
WC	(United States) W Blumberg (United States) Blaine Boyden	7	6
WC	(Lithuania) T Babelis (Montenegro) I Saveljić	1	4
(United States) JC Aragone (United States) R Galloway	6	6
(Zimbabwe) B Lock (United States) N Pasha	4	4
4	(Japan) T Matsui (Denmark) F Nielsen	6	6
(United States) E King (United States) H Reese	6	6
(Australia) M Banes (Australia) L Saville	3	1
(Venezuela) LD Martínez (Spain) D Pérez Sanz	6	3	[10]
2	(El Salvador) M Arévalo (Venezuela) R Maytín	4	6	[7]

Quarterfinals
1	(France) F Martin (France) H Nys	7^{7}	7
(Mexico) H Hach Verdugo (Sweden) A Siljeström	6^{5}	5
3	(Canada) P Polansky (United States) J Withrow	2	5
WC	(United States) W Blumberg (United States) B Boyden	6	7
(United States) JC Aragone (United States) R Galloway
4	(Japan) T Matsui (Denmark) F Nielsen	w/o
(United States) E King (United States) H Reese	7^{7}	5	[11]
(Venezuela) LD Martínez (Spain) D Pérez Sanz	6^{5}	7	[9]

Semifinals
1	(France) F Martin (France) H Nys	6	5	[13]
WC	(United States) W Blumberg (United States) B Boyden	3	7	[11]
4	(Japan) T Matsui (Denmark) F Nielsen	6	1	[8]
(United States) E King (United States) H Reese	2	6	[10]

Final
1	(France) F Martin (France) H Nys	4	6^{6}
(United States) E King (United States) H Reese	6	7^{8}
