= 2021 Cary Challenger II =

- Date: 13–19 September
- Edition: 8th
- Surface: Hard
- Location: Cary, North Carolina, United States

Champions

Singles
- (United States) Mitchell Krueger

Doubles
- (United States) William Blumberg / (United States) Max Schnur
← 2021 ·	Cary Challenger	· 2022 →

The 2021 Cary Challenger II was a professional tennis tournament being played on hard courts. It was the 8th edition of the tournament which was part of the 2021 ATP Challenger Tour. It took place in Cary, North Carolina, United States between 13 and 19 September 2021.

== Singles main-draw entrants ==
=== Seeds ===
Country	Player	Rank^{1}	Seed
USA	Tennys Sandgren	91	1
USA	Denis Kudla	92	2
ITA	Salvatore Caruso	113	3
AUS	Alex Bolt	146	4
TPE	Jason Jung	166	5
USA	Mitchell Krueger	175	6
USA	Michael Mmoh	181	7
USA	Bjorn Fratangelo	190	8

- ^{1} Rankings are as of August 30, 2021.

=== Other entrants ===
The following players received wildcards into the singles main draw:

- (United States) Garrett Johns
- (Switzerland) Luca Stäheli
- (United States) Zachary Svajda

The following players received entry from the qualifying draw:

- (Australia) Rinky Hijikata
- (United States) Aleksandar Kovacevic
- (Japan) Shintaro Mochizuki
- (United States) Alexander Sarkissian

== Champions ==
=== Singles ===
- (United States) Mitchell Krueger def. (United States) Bjorn Fratangelo 6–4, 6–3.

=== Doubles ===
- (United States) William Blumberg / (United States) Max Schnur def. (United States) Stefan Kozlov / (Canada) Peter Polansky 6–4, 1–6, [10–4].
