= 2021 Cary Challenger – Doubles =

Doubles
- 2021 Cary Challenger

Final
- Champions: (United States) Christian Harrison (United States) Dennis Novikov
- Runners-up: (Cyprus) Petros Chrysochos (Greece) Michail Pervolarakis
- Score: 6–3, 6–3

Events
Singles	Doubles
← 2020 ·	Cary Challenger	· 2021 →

Teymuraz Gabashvili and Dennis Novikov were the defending champions but only Novikov chose to defend his title, partnering Christian Harrison. Novikov successfully defended his title.

Harrison and Novikov won the title after defeating Petros Chrysochos and Michail Pervolarakis 6–3, 6–3 in the final.

== Seeds ==
1. (United States) Christian Harrison / (United States) Dennis Novikov (champions)
2. (United States) Christopher Eubanks / (South Africa) Ruan Roelofse (quarterfinals)
3. (United States) Mitchell Krueger / (Canada) Brayden Schnur (quarterfinals, withdrew)
4. (Dominican Republic) Roberto Cid Subervi / (Ecuador) Roberto Quiroz (first round)

== Draw ==
=== Key ===
- Q = Qualifier
- WC = Wild card
- LL = Lucky loser
- Alt = Alternate
- SE = Special exempt
- PR = Protected ranking
- ITF = ITF entry
- JE = Junior exempt
- w/o = Walkover
- r = Retired
- d = Defaulted
- SR = Special ranking

First round
(United States) U Blanch (United States) S Riffice	6	7
(Bolivia) B Arias (Argentina) G Villanueva	1	5
(United States) W Blumberg (United States) R Harrison
(Slovakia) L Lacko (India) R Ramanathan	w/o
(Japan) T Ito (Japan) Shuichi Sekiguchi
WC	(United States) Sean Scully (United States) Andrew Zhang	w/o
WC	(United States) A Kovacevic (United States) B Shelton	6	6^{5}	[10]
4	(Dominican Republic) R Cid Subervi (Ecuador) R Quiroz	1	7^{7}	[8]
(United Kingdom) A McHugh (United Kingdom) J Ward
(Cyprus) P Chrysochos (Greece) M Pervolarakis	w/o

Quarterfinals
1	(United States) C Harrison (United States) D Novikov	6	7
(United States) U Blanch (United States) S Riffice	3	5
3	(United States) M Krueger (Canada) B Schnur
(Slovakia) L Lacko (India) R Ramanathan	w/o
WC	(United States) S Scully (United States) A Zhang	4	2
WC	(United States) A Kovacevic (United States) B Shelton	6	6
(Cyprus) P Chrysochos (Greece) M Pervolarakis	6	6
2	(United States) C Eubanks (South Africa) R Roelofse	4	4

Semifinals
1	(United States) C Harrison (United States) D Novikov	7	6
(Slovakia) L Lacko (India) R Ramanathan	5	3
WC	(United States) A Kovacevic (United States) B Shelton	4	6	[3]
(Cyprus) P Chrysochos (Greece) M Pervolarakis	6	1	[10]

Final
1	(United States) C Harrison (United States) D Novikov	6	6
(Cyprus) P Chrysochos (Greece) M Pervolarakis	3	3
