= 2021 Cary Challenger – Singles =

Singles
- 2021 Cary Challenger

Final
- Champion: (United States) Mitchell Krueger
- Runner-up: (India) Ramkumar Ramanathan
- Score: 7–6^{(7–4)}, 6–2

Events
Singles	Doubles
← 2020 ·	Cary Challenger	· 2021 →

Denis Kudla was the defending champion but chose not to defend his title.

Mitchell Krueger won the title after defeating Ramkumar Ramanathan 7–6^{(7–4)}, 6–2 in the final.

== Seeds ==
1. (United States) Jenson Brooksby (withdrew)
2. (India) Prajnesh Gunneswaran (quarterfinals)
3. (United States) Maxime Cressy (second round)
4. (United States) Bjorn Fratangelo (first round)
5. (Slovakia) Lukáš Lacko (first round)
6. (United States) Mitchell Krueger (champion)
7. (United States) Christopher Eubanks (quarterfinals)
8. (India) Ramkumar Ramanathan (final)

== Draw ==
=== Key ===
- Q = Qualifier
- WC = Wild card
- LL = Lucky loser
- Alt = Alternate
- SE = Special exempt
- PR = Protected ranking
- ITF = ITF entry
- JE = Junior exempt
- w/o = Walkover
- r = Retired
- d = Defaulted
- SR = Special ranking

=== Finals ===
Semifinals
6	(United States) Mitchell Krueger	6	6
WC	(United States) Govind Nanda	3	2
(United States) Stefan Kozlov	6	3	1
8	(India) Ramkumar Ramanathan	1	6	6

Final
6	(United States) Mitchell Krueger	7^{7}	6
8	(India) Ramkumar Ramanathan	6^{4}	2

=== Top half ===
First round
Q	(Argentina) GA Olivieri	4	6	7
(India) S Mukund	6	2	5
(Dominican Republic) R Cid Subervi	3	7	6
(Argentina) G Villanueva	6	5	1
Q	(Japan) S Mochizuki	4	7^{8}	4
LL	(United Kingdom) A McHugh	6	6^{6}	6
WC	(United States) W Blumberg	6	3	6^{4}
6	(United States) M Krueger	4	6	7^{7}
4	(United States) B Fratangelo	6^{5}	6	3
(Canada) B Schnur	7^{7}	3	6
(Ecuador) R Quiroz	2	3
WC	(United States) G Nanda	6	6
(United States) C Harrison	6	6
(Japan) Shuichi Sekiguchi	4	4
(Denmark) M Torpegaard	6	6
5	(Slovakia) L Lacko	4	2

Second round
Q	(Argentina) GA Olivieri	7^{8}	6
(Dominican Republic) R Cid Subervi	6^{6}	0
LL	(United Kingdom) A McHugh	1	6^{2}
6	(United States) M Krueger	6	7^{7}
(Canada) B Schnur	6	5	5
WC	(United States) G Nanda	3	7	7
(United States) C Harrison	7	6
(Denmark) M Torpegaard	5	2

Quarterfinals
Q	(Argentina) GA Olivieri	2	6	3
6	(United States) M Krueger	6	2	6
WC	(United States) G Nanda	2	7^{7}	6
(United States) C Harrison	6	6^{2}	3

Semifinals
6	(United States) M Krueger	6	6
WC	(United States) G Nanda	3	2

=== Bottom half ===
First round
7	(United States) C Eubanks	7	6
(Cyprus) P Chrysochos	5	3
(United States) J Sock	2	6	6
(United States) U Blanch	6	4	2
(United States) S Kozlov	4	6	6
(United States) D Young	6	4	4
(United States) N Rubin	3	6^{5}
3	(United States) M Cressy	6	7^{7}
8	(India) R Ramanathan	6	5	6
Q	(United States) A Kovacevic	4	7	4
PR	(United Kingdom) J Ward	6^{1}	0
Q	(Canada) A Galarneau	7^{7}	6
WC	(United States) S Riffice	6^{3}	6	7
(Japan) T Ito	7^{7}	4	5
(United States) T-S Kwiatkowski	3	2^{r}
2	(India) P Gunneswaran	6	3

Second round
7	(United States) C Eubanks	7^{7}	7
(United States) J Sock	6^{4}	5
(United States) S Kozlov	3	6	6
3	(United States) M Cressy	6	3	4
8	(India) R Ramanathan	7^{7}	4	6
Q	(Canada) A Galarneau	6^{4}	6	4
WC	(United States) S Riffice	2	4
2	(India) P Gunneswaran	6	6

Quarterfinals
7	(United States) C Eubanks	7	1	3
(United States) S Kozlov	5	6	6
8	(India) R Ramanathan	3	7^{7}	6
2	(India) P Gunneswaran	6	6^{5}	4

Semifinals
(United States) S Kozlov	6	3	1
8	(India) R Ramanathan	1	6	6
