= 2017 Cary Challenger =

- Date: 11–17 September
- Edition: 3rd
- Draw: 32S / 16D
- Surface: Hard
- Location: Cary, North Carolina, United States

Champions

Singles
- (United States) Kevin King

Doubles
- (El Salvador) Marcelo Arévalo / (Mexico) Miguel Ángel Reyes-Varela
← 2016 ·	Cary Challenger	· 2018 →

The 2017 Cary Challenger was a professional tennis tournament played on hard courts. It was the 3rd edition of the tournament which was part of the 2017 ATP Challenger Tour. It took place in Cary, North Carolina, United States between 11 and 17 September 2017.

== Singles main-draw entrants ==
=== Seeds ===
Country	Player	Rank^{1}	Seed
USA	Ernesto Escobedo	77	1
USA	Tennys Sandgren	105	2
USA	Michael Mmoh	145	3
~~USA~~	~~Tommy Paul~~	~~159~~	~~4~~
USA	Mitchell Krueger	197	5
USA	Noah Rubin	199	6
USA	Mackenzie McDonald	206	7
USA	Dennis Novikov	207	8
CHI	Christian Garín	214	9

- ^{1} Rankings are as of August 28, 2017.

=== Other entrants ===
The following players received wildcards into the singles main draw:

- (United States) William Blumberg
- (Canada) Alexis Galarneau
- (United States) Thai-Son Kwiatkowski
- (United States) Patrick Kypson

The following players received entry into the singles main draw using protected rankings:

- (United States) Kevin King
- (United Kingdom) Alexander Ward

The following players received entry from the qualifying draw:

- (United States) Ryan Haviland
- (Tunisia) Skander Mansouri
- (Australia) Aleksandar Vukic
- (United States) Julian Zlobinsky

The following player received entry as a lucky loser:

- (United Kingdom) Luke Bambridge

== Champions ==
=== Singles ===
- (United States) Kevin King def. (United Kingdom) Cameron Norrie 6–4, 6–1.

=== Doubles ===
- (El Salvador) Marcelo Arévalo / (Mexico) Miguel Ángel Reyes-Varela def. (Latvia) Miķelis Lībietis / (United States) Dennis Novikov 6–7^{(6–8)}, 7–6^{(7–1)}, [10–6].
