= 2017 Cary Challenger – Singles =

Singles
- 2017 Cary Challenger

Final
- Champion: (United States) Kevin King
- Runner-up: (United Kingdom) Cameron Norrie
- Score: 6–4, 6–1

Events
Singles	Doubles
- Cary Challenger

James McGee was the defending champion but chose not to defend his title.

Kevin King won the title after defeating Cameron Norrie 6–4, 6–1 in the final.

== Seeds ==
1. (United States) Ernesto Escobedo (second round)
2. (United States) Tennys Sandgren (second round)
3. (United States) Michael Mmoh (first round, retired)
4. (United States) Tommy Paul (withdrew)
5. (United States) Mitchell Krueger (quarterfinals)
6. (United States) Noah Rubin (semifinals)
7. (United States) Mackenzie McDonald (quarterfinals)
8. (United States) Dennis Novikov (second round)
9. (Chile) Christian Garín (quarterfinals)

== Draw ==
Key

- Q = Qualifier
- WC = Wild card
- LL = Lucky loser
- Alt = Alternate
- ITF = ITF entry
- PR = Protected ranking
- SR = Special ranking
- SE = Special exempt
- JE = Junior exempt
- JR = Junior Accelerator Programme entrant
- CO = College Accelerator Programme entrant
- NG = Next Gen Accelerator Program entrant
- w/o = Walkover
- r = Retired
- d = Defaulted

=== Finals ===
Semifinals
PR	(United States) Kevin King	6	4	6
6	(United States) Noah Rubin	2	6	4
(El Salvador) Marcelo Arévalo	0	4
(United Kingdom) Cameron Norrie	6	6

Final
PR	(United States) Kevin King	6	6
(United Kingdom) Cameron Norrie	4	1

=== Top half ===
First round
1	(United States) E Escobedo	6	7^{7}
WC	(United States) P Kypson	1	6^{0}
PR	(United States) K King	6	7^{8}
(United States) Jared Hiltzik	2	6^{6}
(Argentina) F Mena	6	4
Q	(United States) Ryan Haviland	3	0^{r}
(United States) A Krajicek	6	5	5
8	(United States) D Novikov	4	7	7
9	(Chile) C Garín	6	6
(United States) R Sarmiento	2	3
LL	(United Kingdom) L Bambridge	7^{7}	3	7^{7}
WC	(United States) T-S Kwiatkowski	6^{5}	6	6^{2}
Q	(Tunisia) S Mansouri	4	3
(Brazil) JP Sorgi	6	6
(Brazil) P Sakamoto	3	3
6	(United States) N Rubin	6	6

Second round
1	(United States) E Escobedo	6	5	3
PR	(United States) K King	3	7	6
(Argentina) F Mena	6	6
8	(United States) D Novikov	4	3
9	(Chile) C Garín	6	6
LL	(United Kingdom) L Bambridge	1	4
(Brazil) JP Sorgi	4	2
6	(United States) N Rubin	6	6

Quarterfinals
PR	(United States) K King	7^{7}	6
(Argentina) F Mena	6^{2}	4
9	(Chile) C Garín	4	2
6	(United States) N Rubin	6	6

Semifinals
PR	(United States) K King	6	4	6
6	(United States) N Rubin	2	6	4

=== Bottom half ===
First round
5	(United States) M Krueger	7^{7}	6
(United States) Wil Spencer	6^{4}	3
WC	(United States) W Blumberg	6	7^{7}
(United Kingdom) B Klein	2	6^{5}
Q	(United States) Julian Zlobinsky	6	5	7
WC	(Canada) A Galarneau	4	7	5
(El Salvador) M Arévalo	5
3	(United States) M Mmoh	2^{r}
7	(United States) M McDonald	6	6
PR	(United Kingdom) A Ward	3	2
(United States) C Harrison	6	7
Q	(Australia) A Vukic	3	5
(United Kingdom) C Norrie	6	6
(United States) S Bangoura	2	3
(Croatia) A Pavić	4	4
2	(United States) T Sandgren	6	6

Second round
5	(United States) M Krueger	6	6
WC	(United States) W Blumberg	2	2
Q	(United States) J Zlobinsky	2	6^{5}
(El Salvador) M Arévalo	6	7^{7}
7	(United States) M McDonald	6	7
(United States) C Harrison	3	5
(United Kingdom) C Norrie	6	2	6
2	(United States) T Sandgren	3	6	2

Quarterfinals
5	(United States) M Krueger	3	0
(El Salvador) M Arévalo	6	6
7	(United States) M McDonald	1	3
(United Kingdom) C Norrie	6	6

Semifinals
(El Salvador) M Arévalo	0	4
(United Kingdom) C Norrie	6	6
