= 2021 Cary Challenger II – Doubles =

Doubles
- 2021 Cary Challenger II

Final
- Champions: (United States) William Blumberg (United States) Max Schnur
- Runners-up: (United States) Stefan Kozlov (Canada) Peter Polansky
- Score: 6–4, 1–6, [10–4]

Events
| Singles | Doubles |
| ← 2021 · | Cary Challenger | · 2022 → |

Christian Harrison and Dennis Novikov were the defending champions but lost in the semifinals to William Blumberg and Max Schnur.

Blumberg and Schnur won the title after defeating Stefan Kozlov and Peter Polansky 6–4, 1–6, [10–4] in the final.

== Seeds ==
1. (United Kingdom) Lloyd Glasspool / (United States) Nicholas Monroe (first round)
2. (United States) Evan King / (United States) Jackson Withrow (first round)
3. (United States) Robert Galloway / (United States) Alex Lawson (first round)
4. (United States) Christian Harrison / (United States) Dennis Novikov (semifinals)

== Draw ==
Key

- Q = Qualifier
- WC = Wild card
- LL = Lucky loser
- Alt = Alternate
- ITF = ITF entry
- PR = Protected ranking
- SR = Special ranking
- SE = Special exempt
- JE = Junior exempt
- JR = Junior Accelerator Programme entrant
- CO = College Accelerator Programme entrant
- NG = Next Gen Accelerator Program entrant
- w/o = Walkover
- r = Retired
- d = Defaulted

First round
1 | (United Kingdom) L Glasspool (United States) N Monroe | 2 | 5
(United States) W Blumberg (United States) M Schnur | 6 | 7
(United States) Mi Redlicki (United States) D Young | 3 | 6^{4}
(Australia) T Fancutt (Australia) J Kubler | 6 | 7^{7}
4 | (United States) C Harrison (United States) D Novikov | 6 | 6
WC | (United States) Robin Catry (France) Damien Salvestre | 3 | 4
Alt | (United States) S Kirchheimer (Japan) S Mochizuki | 6 | 3 | [10]
(Netherlands) G Brouwer (United States) R Stalder | 4 | 6 | [7]
WC | (United States) G Johns (United States) Sean Sculley | 4 | 4
(United States) JC Aragone (Colombia) N Barrientos | 6 | 6
(United States) S Kozlov (Canada) P Polansky | 6 | 6
3 | (United States) R Galloway (United States) A Lawson | 1 | 2
(Chinese Taipei) J Jung (United States) M Krueger | 7^{8} | 3 | [10]
WC | (United States) Brian Cernoch (United States) M Kiger | 6^{6} | 6 | [5]
Alt | (Australia) A Bolt (Australia) R Hijikata | 7^{9} | 6^{5} | [12]
2 | (United States) E King (United States) J Withrow | 6^{7} | 7^{7} | [10]

Quarterfinals
(United States) W Blumberg (United States) M Schnur | 7 | 6
(Australia) T Fancutt (Australia) J Kubler | 5 | 1
4 | (United States) C Harrison (United States) D Novikov | 4 | 6 | [10]
Alt | (United States) S Kirchheimer (Japan) S Mochizuki | 6 | 3 | [4]
(United States) JC Aragone (Colombia) N Barrientos | 4 | 4
(United States) S Kozlov (Canada) P Polansky | 6 | 6
(Chinese Taipei) J Jung (United States) M Krueger | 6 | 6^{2} | [12]
Alt | (Australia) A Bolt (Australia) R Hijikata | 4 | 7^{7} | [10]

Semifinals
(United States) W Blumberg (United States) M Schnur | 3 | 6 | [10]
4 | (United States) C Harrison (United States) D Novikov | 6 | 1 | [5]
(United States) S Kozlov (Canada) P Polansky | 6^{4} | 7 | [10]
(Chinese Taipei) J Jung (United States) M Krueger | 7^{7} | 5 | [4]

Final
(United States) W Blumberg (United States) M Schnur | 6 | 1 | [10]
(United States) S Kozlov (Canada) P Polansky | 4 | 6 | [4]
