= 2020 Cary Challenger – Doubles =

Doubles
- 2020 Cary Challenger

Final
- Champions: (Russia) Teymuraz Gabashvili (United States) Dennis Novikov
- Runners-up: (United Kingdom) Luke Bambridge (United States) Nathaniel Lammons
- Score: 7–5, 4–6, [10–8]

Events
Singles	Doubles
- Cary Challenger

Sekou Bangoura and Michael Mmoh were the defending champions but chose not to defend their title.

Teymuraz Gabashvili and Dennis Novikov won the title after defeating Luke Bambridge and Nathaniel Lammons 7–5, 4–6, [10–8] in the final.

== Seeds ==
1. (United Kingdom) Luke Bambridge / (United States) Nathaniel Lammons (final)
2. (Sweden) André Göransson / (India) Ramkumar Ramanathan (first round)
3. (Mexico) Hans Hach Verdugo / (Mexico) Miguel Ángel Reyes-Varela (first round)
4. (Kazakhstan) Andrey Golubev / (Kazakhstan) Aleksandr Nedovyesov (quarterfinals)

== Draw ==
Key

- Q = Qualifier
- WC = Wild card
- LL = Lucky loser
- Alt = Alternate
- ITF = ITF entry
- PR = Protected ranking
- SR = Special ranking
- SE = Special exempt
- JE = Junior exempt
- JR = Junior Accelerator Programme entrant
- CO = College Accelerator Programme entrant
- NG = Next Gen Accelerator Program entrant
- w/o = Walkover
- r = Retired
- d = Defaulted

First round
1	(United Kingdom) L Bambridge (United States) N Lammons	7	5	[10]
(United States) D Kudla (United States) T-S Kwiatkowski	5	7	[1]
(France) S Doumbia (France) F Reboul	6	6
WC	(Spain) Eduard Güell Bartrina (United States) Sean Sculley	4	4
3	(Mexico) H Hach Verdugo (Mexico) MÁ Reyes-Varela	4	5
WC	(United States) W Blumberg (United States) Brian Cernoch	6	7
(United States) N Pasha (United States) Ma Redlicki	7^{7}	6
(United States) M Krueger (United States) J Withrow	6^{2}	3
WC	(Lithuania) T Babelis (United States) Robin Catry	2	6	[6]
(Russia) T Gabashvili (United States) D Novikov	6	3	[10]
(United States) R Galloway (Philippines) T Huey	1	6	[7]
4	(Kazakhstan) A Golubev (Kazakhstan) A Nedovyesov	6	4	[10]
(Dominican Republic) R Cid Subervi (Colombia) DE Galán	6^{4}	2
(Canada) P Polansky (Kazakhstan) D Popko	7^{7}	6
(United States) H Reese (Netherlands) S Verbeek	6	6
2	(Sweden) A Göransson (India) R Ramanathan	1	4

Quarterfinals
1	(United Kingdom) L Bambridge (United States) N Lammons	7^{7}	3	[10]
(France) S Doumbia (France) F Reboul	6^{5}	6	[7]
WC	(United States) W Blumberg (United States) B Cernoch	3	2
(United States) N Pasha (United States) Ma Redlicki	6	6
(Russia) T Gabashvili (United States) D Novikov	4	6	[10]
4	(Kazakhstan) A Golubev (Kazakhstan) A Nedovyesov	6	4	[3]
(Canada) P Polansky (Kazakhstan) D Popko	6^{6}	5
(United States) H Reese (Netherlands) S Verbeek	7^{8}	7

Semifinals
1	(United Kingdom) L Bambridge (United States) N Lammons	w/o
(United States) N Pasha (United States) Ma Redlicki
(Russia) T Gabashvili (United States) D Novikov	7	6^{6}	[10]
(United States) H Reese (Netherlands) S Verbeek	5	7^{8}	[8]

Final
1	(United Kingdom) L Bambridge (United States) N Lammons	5	6	[8]
(Russia) T Gabashvili (United States) D Novikov	7	4	[10]
