= 2018 Cary Challenger =

- Date: 10–16 September
- Edition: 4th
- Draw: 32S / 16D
- Surface: Hard
- Location: Cary, North Carolina, United States

Champions

Singles
- (Australia) James Duckworth

Doubles
- (United States) Evan King / (United States) Hunter Reese
← 2017 ·	Cary Challenger	· 2019 →

The 2018 Cary Challenger was a professional tennis tournament played on hard courts. It was the 4th edition of the tournament which was part of the 2018 ATP Challenger Tour. It took place in Cary, North Carolina, United States between 10 and 16 September 2018.

== Singles main-draw entrants ==
=== Seeds ===
Country	Player	Rank^{1}	Seed
CAN	Peter Polansky	119	1
SWE	Elias Ymer	132	2
ESA	Marcelo Arévalo	146	3
USA	Reilly Opelka	173	4
USA	Bjorn Fratangelo	175	5
USA	Kevin King	180	6
AUS	Alexei Popyrin	195	7
AUS	Maverick Banes	216	8

- ^{1} Rankings are as of August 27, 2018.

=== Other entrants ===
The following players received wildcards into the singles main draw:

- (United States) William Blumberg
- (Canada) Alexis Galarneau
- (United States) Sebastian Korda
- (United States) Nick Stachowiak

The following players received entry from the qualifying draw:

- (Belgium) Joris De Loore
- (Australia) James Duckworth
- (United States) Evan Song
- (United States) J. J. Wolf

== Champions ==
=== Singles ===
- (Australia) James Duckworth def. (United States) Reilly Opelka 7–6^{(7–4)}, 6–3.

=== Doubles ===
- (United States) Evan King / (United States) Hunter Reese def. (France) Fabrice Martin / (France) Hugo Nys 6–4, 7–6^{(8–6)}.
