= 2021 Cary Challenger =

- Date: 19–25 July
- Edition: 7th
- Surface: Hard
- Location: Cary, North Carolina, United States

Champions

Singles
- (United States) Mitchell Krueger

Doubles
- (United States) Christian Harrison / (United States) Dennis Novikov
← 2020 ·	Cary Challenger	· 2021 →

The 2021 Cary Challenger was a professional tennis tournament being played on hard courts. It was the 7th edition of the tournament which was part of the 2021 ATP Challenger Tour. It took place in Cary, North Carolina, United States between 19 and 25 July 2021.

== Singles main-draw entrants ==
=== Seeds ===
Country	Player	Rank^{1}	Seed
~~USA~~	~~Jenson Brooksby~~	~~152~~	~~1~~
IND	Prajnesh Gunneswaran	153	2
USA	Maxime Cressy	155	3
USA	Bjorn Fratangelo	187	4
SVK	Lukáš Lacko	190	5
USA	Mitchell Krueger	195	6
USA	Christopher Eubanks	215	7
IND	Ramkumar Ramanathan	216	8

- ^{1} Rankings are as of July 12, 2021.

=== Other entrants ===
The following players received wildcards into the singles main draw:

- (United States) William Blumberg
- (United States) Govind Nanda
- (United States) Sam Riffice

The following player received entry into the singles main draw using a protected ranking:

- (United Kingdom) James Ward

The following players received entry from the qualifying draw:

- (Canada) Alexis Galarneau
- (United States) Aleksandar Kovacevic
- (Japan) Shintaro Mochizuki
- (Argentina) Genaro Alberto Olivieri

The following player received entry as a lucky loser:

- (United Kingdom) Aidan McHugh

== Champions ==
=== Singles ===
- (United States) Mitchell Krueger def. (India) Ramkumar Ramanathan 7–6^{(7–4)}, 6–2.

=== Doubles ===
- (United States) Christian Harrison / (United States) Dennis Novikov def. (Cyprus) Petros Chrysochos / (Greece) Michail Pervolarakis 6–3, 6–3.
