= 2022 Cary Challenger – Singles =

Singles
- 2022 Cary Challenger

Final
- Champion: (United States) Michael Mmoh
- Runner-up: (Germany) Dominik Koepfer
- Score: 7–5, 6–3

Events
Singles	Doubles
- Cary Challenger

Mitchell Krueger was the defending champion but lost in the first round to Keegan Smith.

Michael Mmoh won the title after defeating Dominik Koepfer 7–5, 6–3 in the final.

== Seeds ==
1. (United States) Denis Kudla (semifinals)
2. (Australia) Jordan Thompson (semifinals)
3. (United States) Stefan Kozlov (second round, retired)
4. (Argentina) Juan Pablo Ficovich (second round)
5. (Argentina) Facundo Mena (quarterfinals)
6. (Australia) Aleksandar Vukic (first round)
7. (United States) Michael Mmoh (champion)
8. (Germany) Dominik Koepfer (final)

== Draw ==
Key

- Q = Qualifier
- WC = Wild card
- LL = Lucky loser
- Alt = Alternate
- ITF = ITF entry
- PR = Protected ranking
- SR = Special ranking
- SE = Special exempt
- JE = Junior exempt
- JR = Junior Accelerator Programme entrant
- CO = College Accelerator Programme entrant
- NG = Next Gen Accelerator Program entrant
- w/o = Walkover
- r = Retired
- d = Defaulted

=== Finals ===
Semifinals
1	(United States) Denis Kudla	6^{5}	3
8	(Germany) Dominik Koepfer	7^{7}	6
7	(United States) Michael Mmoh	6	6
2	(Australia) Jordan Thompson	3	2

Final
8	(Germany) Dominik Koepfer	5	3
7	(United States) Michael Mmoh	7	6

=== Top half ===
First round
1	(United States) D Kudla	0	6	6
(United States) Z Svajda	6	2	2
Q	(United States) G Johns	1	4
(United States) Em Nava	6	6
(Australia) R Hijikata	2	3
(United States) G Nanda	6	6
(United States) O Crawford	6^{4}	2
5	(Argentina) F Mena	7^{7}	6
4	(Argentina) JP Ficovich	6	7^{7}
WC	(United States) M Damm	3	6^{4}
(United Kingdom) A McHugh	4	2
Alt	(United States) T Sandgren	6	6
(United States) K Smith	6	7^{7}
(United States) M Krueger	3	6^{2}
(United States) A Kovacevic	4	4
8	(Germany) D Koepfer	6	6

Second round
1	(United States) D Kudla	6^{4}	6	6
(United States) Em Nava	7^{7}	1	3
(United States) G Nanda	3	3
5	(Argentina) F Mena	6	6
4	(Argentina) JP Ficovich	6^{3}	3
Alt	(United States) T Sandgren	7^{7}	6
(United States) K Smith	6	3	2
8	(Germany) D Koepfer	1	6	6

Quarterfinals
1	(United States) D Kudla	6	6
5	(Argentina) F Mena	3	1
Alt	(United States) T Sandgren	4	2
8	(Germany) D Koepfer	6	6

Semifinals
1	(United States) D Kudla	6^{5}	3
8	(Germany) D Koepfer	7^{7}	6

=== Bottom half ===
First round
7	(United States) M Mmoh	6	6
(United Kingdom) D Cox	0	3
WC	(United States) B Shick	3	5
(United States) A Rybakov	6	7
(Japan) Y Uchiyama	4	6	6
Q	(United States) D Young	6	3	0
Q	(United States) C Kingsley	6	2	2
3	(United States) S Kozlov	2	6	6
6	(Australia) A Vukic	6^{4}	6^{3}
Q	(United States) R Harrison	7^{7}	7^{7}
Alt	(United States) N Chappell	6	7^{7}
Q	(Estonia) D Glinka	2	6^{3}
Q	(United Kingdom) H Patten	5	6^{8}
(China) J Shang	7	7^{10}
WC	(United States) R Seggerman	3	2
2	(Australia) J Thompson	6	6

Second round
7	(United States) M Mmoh	w/o
(United States) A Rybakov
(Japan) Y Uchiyama	6	2
3	(United States) S Kozlov	4	0^{r}
Q	(United States) R Harrison	4	6	2
Alt	(United States) N Chappell	6	4	6
(China) J Shang	6^{4}	7^{12}	2
2	(Australia) J Thompson	7^{7}	6^{10}	6

Quarterfinals
7	(United States) M Mmoh	6	3	6
(Japan) Y Uchiyama	3	6	3
Alt	(United States) N Chappell	3	1
2	(Australia) J Thompson	6	6

Semifinals
7	(United States) M Mmoh	6	6
2	(Australia) J Thompson	3	2
