= 2019 Cary Challenger – Doubles =

Doubles
- 2019 Cary Challenger

Final
- Champions: (United States) Sekou Bangoura (United States) Michael Mmoh
- Runners-up: (Philippines) Treat Huey (Australia) John-Patrick Smith
- Score: 4–6, 6–4, [10–8]

Events
Singles	Doubles
- Cary Challenger

Evan King and Hunter Reese were the defending champions but chose not to defend their title.

Sekou Bangoura and Michael Mmoh won the title after defeating Treat Huey and John-Patrick Smith 4–6, 6–4, [10–8] in the final.

== Seeds ==
1. (United States) Nicholas Monroe / (Australia) Matt Reid (first round)
2. (United States) Nathaniel Lammons / (United States) Alex Lawson (first round)
3. (United States) JC Aragone / (United States) Jackson Withrow (first round)
4. (United States) James Cerretani / (United States) Dennis Novikov (quarterfinals)

== Draw ==
Key

- Q = Qualifier
- WC = Wild card
- LL = Lucky loser
- Alt = Alternate
- ITF = ITF entry
- PR = Protected ranking
- SR = Special ranking
- SE = Special exempt
- JE = Junior exempt
- JR = Junior Accelerator Programme entrant
- CO = College Accelerator Programme entrant
- NG = Next Gen Accelerator Program entrant
- w/o = Walkover
- r = Retired
- d = Defaulted

First round
1	(United States) N Monroe (Australia) M Reid	2	5
(United States) N Pasha (United States) M Schnur	6	7
(United States) R Galloway (United States) Ma Redlicki	3	6	[6]
(Philippines) T Huey (Australia) J-P Smith	6	3	[10]
4	(United States) J Cerretani (United States) D Novikov	6	6
(United States) T-S Kwiatkowski (United States) N Rubin	4	1
(Mexico) H Hach Verdugo (United States) D Young	7^{8}	7^{7}
(Canada) F Peliwo (Canada) P Polansky	6^{6}	6^{4}
WC	(Lithuania) T Babelis (Israel) Yannai Barkai	6	6^{6}	[10]
WC	(United States) Sean Sculley (United States) Nick Stachowiak	4	7^{8}	[3]
(United States) S Bangoura (United States) M Mmoh	6	3	[10]
3	(United States) JC Aragone (United States) J Withrow	0	6	[5]
(France) E Couacaud (Argentina) R Olivo	6	4	[10]
WC	(United States) M Kiger (Canada) Joshua Peck	3	6	[2]
(United States) K Lovett (United States) T Paul	6	6
2	(United States) N Lammons (United States) A Lawson	3	4

Quarterfinals
(United States) N Pasha (United States) M Schnur	6	2	[8]
(Philippines) T Huey (Australia) J-P Smith	4	6	[10]
4	(United States) J Cerretani (United States) D Novikov	5	2
(Mexico) H Hach Verdugo (United States) D Young	7	6
WC	(Lithuania) T Babelis (Israel) Y Barkai	3	7^{8}	[2]
(United States) S Bangoura (United States) M Mmoh	6	6^{6}	[10]
(France) E Couacaud (Argentina) R Olivo	4	4
(United States) K Lovett (United States) T Paul	6	6

Semifinals
(Philippines) T Huey (Australia) J-P Smith	5	6	[10]
(Mexico) H Hach Verdugo (United States) D Young	7	4	[8]
(United States) S Bangoura (United States) M Mmoh	w/o
(United States) K Lovett (United States) T Paul

Final
(Philippines) T Huey (Australia) J-P Smith	6	4	[8]
(United States) S Bangoura (United States) M Mmoh	4	6	[10]
