= 2022 Cary Challenger – Doubles =

Doubles
- 2022 Cary Challenger

Final
- Champions: (United States) Nathaniel Lammons (United States) Jackson Withrow
- Runners-up: (Philippines) Treat Huey (Australia) John-Patrick Smith
- Score: 7–5, 2–6, [10–5]

Events
Singles	Doubles
- Cary Challenger

William Blumberg and Max Schnur were the defending champions but only Blumberg chose to defend his title, partnering Luke Saville. Blumberg lost in the first round to Juan Pablo Ficovich and Facundo Mena.

Nathaniel Lammons and Jackson Withrow won the title after defeating Treat Huey and John-Patrick Smith 7–5, 2–6, [10–5] in the final.

== Seeds ==
1. (United States) Nathaniel Lammons / (United States) Jackson Withrow (champions)
2. (United States) William Blumberg / (Australia) Luke Saville (first round)
3. (United States) Robert Galloway / (United States) Alex Lawson (first round)
4. (Philippines) Treat Huey / (Australia) John-Patrick Smith (final)

== Draw ==
Key

- Q = Qualifier
- WC = Wild card
- LL = Lucky loser
- Alt = Alternate
- ITF = ITF entry
- PR = Protected ranking
- SR = Special ranking
- SE = Special exempt
- JE = Junior exempt
- JR = Junior Accelerator Programme entrant
- CO = College Accelerator Programme entrant
- NG = Next Gen Accelerator Program entrant
- w/o = Walkover
- r = Retired
- d = Defaulted

First round
1	(United States) N Lammons (United States) J Withrow	6	7^{7}
(United States) Nicholas Bybel (United States) O Crawford	2	6^{4}
WC	(United States) P Kypson (United States) S Riffice	6	7^{7}
(Philippines) R Gonzales (United States) R Stalder	1	6^{5}
3	(United States) R Galloway (United States) A Lawson	3	5
(United Kingdom) J Cash (United Kingdom) H Patten	6	7
(United States) G Nanda (United States) T Zink
(Brazil) M Demoliner (Mexico) H Hach Verdugo	w/o
(United States) H Reese (Netherlands) S Verbeek	3	6	[11]
Alt	(Australia) R Hijikata (United States) M Kiger	6	4	[9]
WC	(Latvia) M Rocēns (Netherlands) Fons van Sambeek	6	4	[10]
4	(Philippines) T Huey (Australia) J-P Smith	2	6	[12]
(United States) N Chappell (United States) Ezekiel Clark	3	4
(United Kingdom) A McHugh (United States) J McNally	6	6
(Argentina) JP Ficovich (Argentina) F Mena	6	3	[10]
2	(United States) W Blumberg (Australia) L Saville	4	6	[7]

Quarterfinals
1	(United States) N Lammons (United States) J Withrow	6	6
WC	(United States) P Kypson (United States) S Riffice	3	3
(United Kingdom) J Cash (United Kingdom) H Patten	6^{7}	6	[10]
(Brazil) M Demoliner (Mexico) H Hach Verdugo	7^{9}	4	[5]
(United States) H Reese (Netherlands) S Verbeek	6^{6}	4
4	(Philippines) T Huey (Australia) J-P Smith	7^{8}	6
(United Kingdom) A McHugh (United States) J McNally	w/o
(Argentina) JP Ficovich (Argentina) F Mena

Semifinals
1	(United States) N Lammons (United States) J Withrow	1	7^{9}	[10]
(United Kingdom) J Cash (United Kingdom) H Patten	6	6^{7}	[6]
4	(Philippines) T Huey (Australia) J-P Smith	7^{7}	6
(United Kingdom) A McHugh (United States) J McNally	6^{5}	4

Final
1	(United States) N Lammons (United States) J Withrow	7	2	[10]
4	(Philippines) T Huey (Australia) J-P Smith	5	6	[5]
