= 2017 Cary Challenger – Doubles =

Doubles
- 2017 Cary Challenger

Final
- Champions: (El Salvador) Marcelo Arévalo (Mexico) Miguel Ángel Reyes-Varela
- Runners-up: (Latvia) Miķelis Lībietis (United States) Dennis Novikov
- Score: 6–7^{(6–8)}, 7–6^{(7–1)}, [10–6]

Events
Singles	Doubles
- Cary Challenger

Philip Bester and Peter Polansky were the defending champions but chose not to defend their title.

Marcelo Arévalo and Miguel Ángel Reyes-Varela won the title after defeating Miķelis Lībietis and Dennis Novikov 6–7^{(6–8)}, 7–6^{(7–1)}, [10–6] in the final.

== Seeds ==
1. (United States) Austin Krajicek / (United States) Jackson Withrow (semifinals)
2. (United Kingdom) Luke Bambridge / (Republic of Ireland) David O'Hare (quarterfinals)
3. (United States) Sekou Bangoura / (United States) Evan King (quarterfinals)
4. (Mexico) Hans Hach Verdugo / (United Kingdom) Brydan Klein (first round)

== Draw ==
Key

- Q = Qualifier
- WC = Wild card
- LL = Lucky loser
- Alt = Alternate
- ITF = ITF entry
- PR = Protected ranking
- SR = Special ranking
- SE = Special exempt
- JE = Junior exempt
- JR = Junior Accelerator Programme entrant
- CO = College Accelerator Programme entrant
- NG = Next Gen Accelerator Program entrant
- w/o = Walkover
- r = Retired
- d = Defaulted

First round
(Mexico) L Patiño (United States) R Sarmiento	5	6	[10]
(South Africa) Damon Gooch (United States) Wil Spencer	7	4	[5]
3	(United States) S Bangoura (United States) E King	6	6
(Croatia) A Pavić (Russia) D Tursunov	2	2
WC	(Canada) A Galarneau (United States) Michael Ogden	4	1
(El Salvador) M Arévalo (Mexico) MÁ Reyes-Varela	6	6
(United States) T-S Kwiatkowski (United States) M McDonald	6^{4}	6	[10]
WC	(United States) W Blumberg (United States) Robert Kelly	7^{7}	2	[6]
(Latvia) M Lībietis (United States) D Novikov	4	6	[10]
4	(Mexico) H Hach Verdugo (United Kingdom) B Klein	6	4	[4]
WC	(United States) Sean Sculley (United States) Nick Stachowiak	4	6	[7]
(Argentina) F Mena (Brazil) JP Sorgi	6	1	[10]

Quarterfinals
1	(United States) A Krajicek (United States) J Withrow	6	3	[12]
(Mexico) L Patiño (United States) R Sarmiento	2	6	[10]
3	(United States) S Bangoura (United States) E King	1	6^{6}
(El Salvador) M Arévalo (Mexico) MÁ Reyes-Varela	6	7^{8}
(United States) T-S Kwiatkowski (United States) M McDonald	1	3
(Latvia) M Lībietis (United States) D Novikov	6	6
(Argentina) F Mena (Brazil) JP Sorgi	7	6
2	(United Kingdom) L Bambridge (Republic of Ireland) D O'Hare	5	3

Semifinals
1	(United States) A Krajicek (United States) J Withrow	5	6^{5}
(El Salvador) M Arévalo (Mexico) MÁ Reyes-Varela	7	7^{7}
(Latvia) M Lībietis (United States) D Novikov	6	6
(Argentina) F Mena (Brazil) JP Sorgi	2	2

Final
(El Salvador) M Arévalo (Mexico) MÁ Reyes-Varela	6^{6}	7^{7}	[10]
(Latvia) M Lībietis (United States) D Novikov	7^{8}	6^{1}	[6]
