= 2022 U.S. Men's Clay Court Championships – Singles =

Singles
- 2022 U.S. Men's Clay Court Championships

Final
- Champion: (United States) Reilly Opelka
- Runner-up: (United States) John Isner
- Score: 6–3, 7–6^{(9–7)}

Details
- Draw: 28 (4 Q / 3 WC)
- Seeds: 8

Events
Singles	Doubles
- U.S. Men's Clay Court Championships

Reilly Opelka defeated John Isner in the final, 6–3, 7–6^{(9–7)}, to win the singles tennis title at the 2022 U.S. Men's Clay Court Championships. It marked Opelka's fourth career Association of Tennis Professionals (ATP) singles title and his first on clay. With Opelka's height at 6 ft 11 in (211 cm) and Isner's at 6 ft 10 in (208 cm), the combined heights of both players made the final the tallest one ever contended during the Open Era. At the age of 36, Isner was also playing to become the oldest champion at the tournament in the Open Era.

Cristian Garín was the defending champion from when the tournament was last held in 2019, but lost in the semifinals to Isner.

== Seeds ==
The top four seeds received a bye into the second round.

1. (Norway) Casper Ruud (withdrew due to tooth pain)
2. (United States) Taylor Fritz (quarterfinals)
3. (United States) Reilly Opelka (champion)
4. (United States) John Isner (final)
5. (Chile) Cristian Garín (semifinals)
6. (United States) Frances Tiafoe (quarterfinals)
7. (United States) Tommy Paul (second round)
8. (United States) Jenson Brooksby (first round)

== Draw ==
Key

- Q = Qualifier
- WC = Wild card
- LL = Lucky loser
- Alt = Alternate
- ITF = ITF entry
- PR = Protected ranking
- SR = Special ranking
- SE = Special exempt
- JE = Junior exempt
- JR = Junior Accelerator Programme entrant
- CO = College Accelerator Programme entrant
- NG = Next Gen Accelerator Program entrant
- w/o = Walkover
- r = Retired
- d = Defaulted

=== Finals ===
Semifinals
WC	(Australia) Nick Kyrgios	3	5
3	(United States) Reilly Opelka	6	7
4	(United States) John Isner	4	6	6
5	(Chile) Cristian Garín	6	3	4

Final
3	(United States) Reilly Opelka	6	7^{9}
4	(United States) John Isner	3	6^{7}

=== Top half ===
First round
(Colombia) DE Galán	6^{0}	6	6^{6}
(United States) S Querrey	7^{7}	3	7^{8}
(United States) M McDonald	6	3	4
WC	(Australia) N Kyrgios	4	6	6
(Germany) P Gojowczyk	7^{7}	6^{5}	2^{r}
7	(United States) T Paul	6^{4}	7^{7}	3
Q	(United States) M Krueger	5
(Peru) JP Varillas	1^{r}
Q	(Netherlands) G Brouwer	6	6
(Spain) F López	4	2
WC	(United States) J. J. Wolf	6	6
8	(United States) J Brooksby	4	4

Second round
LL	(United States) M Mmoh	6	6
(United States) S Querrey	2	4
WC	(Australia) N Kyrgios	6	6
7	(United States) T Paul	4	2
3	(United States) R Opelka	3	6	6
Q	(United States) M Krueger	6	2	4
Q	(Netherlands) G Brouwer	6	6
WC	(United States) J. J. Wolf	1	1

Quarterfinals
LL	(United States) M Mmoh
WC	(Australia) N Kyrgios	w/o
3	(United States) R Opelka	6	7
Q	(Netherlands) G Brouwer	3	5

Semifinals
WC	(Australia) N Kyrgios	3	5
3	(United States) R Opelka	6	7

=== Bottom half ===
First round
6	(United States) F Tiafoe	6	6
(United States) M Giron	4	4
Q	(Australia) M Purcell	6^{7}	3
(Uruguay) P Cuevas	7^{9}	6
(United States) S Johnson	6	4	6
(United States) D Kudla	3	6	4
5	(Chile) C Garín	4	6	7
WC	(United States) J Sock	6	3	5
(Australia) J Thompson	6	6
LL	(Canada) S Diez	3	2
Q	(United States) C Harrison	1	4
(Chile) A Tabilo	6	6

Second round
6	(United States) F Tiafoe	5	7	7^{7}
(Uruguay) P Cuevas	7	5	6^{4}
(United States) S Johnson	7^{7}	6^{4}	3
4	(United States) J Isner	6^{1}	7^{7}	6
5	(Chile) C Garín	3	6	6
(Australia) J Thompson	6	3	3
(Chile) A Tabilo	1	4
2	(United States) T Fritz	6	6

Quarterfinals
6	(United States) F Tiafoe	4	6	3
4	(United States) J Isner	6	2	6
5	(Chile) C Garín	6	6^{5}	6
2	(United States) T Fritz	2	7^{7}	3

Semifinals
4	(United States) J Isner	4	6	6
5	(Chile) C Garín	6	3	4

== Qualifying ==
=== Seeds ===
1. (Chile) Tomás Barrios Vera (first round)
2. (United States) Bjorn Fratangelo (first round)
3. (United States) Mitchell Krueger (qualified)
4. (Australia) Max Purcell (qualified)
5. (United States) Michael Mmoh (qualifying competition, lucky loser)
6. (Chile) Gonzalo Lama (first round)
7. (Canada) Steven Diez (qualifying competition, lucky loser)
8. (United States) Christian Harrison (qualified)

=== Qualifiers ===
1. (Netherlands) Gijs Brouwer
2. (United States) Christian Harrison
3. (United States) Mitchell Krueger
4. (Australia) Max Purcell

=== Lucky losers ===
1. (Canada) Steven Diez
2. (United States) Michael Mmoh

=== Qualifying draw ===
==== First qualifier ====
First round
1	(Chile) Tomás Barrios Vera	4	2
(Netherlands) Gijs Brouwer	6	6
(United States) Zachary Svajda	3	2
7	(Canada) Steven Diez	6	6

Qualifying competition
(Netherlands) Gijs Brouwer	4	7	6
7	(Canada) Steven Diez	6	5	2

==== Second qualifier ====
First round
2	(United States) Bjorn Fratangelo	4	3
WC	(United States) Ryan Harrison	6	6
WC	(Ecuador) Diego Hidalgo
8	(United States) Christian Harrison	w/o

Qualifying competition
WC	(United States) Ryan Harrison	7	4	4
8	(United States) Christian Harrison	5	6	6

==== Third qualifier ====
First round
3	(United States) Mitchell Krueger	7	6
(Australia) Matthew Ebden	5	1
Alt	(France) Sadio Doumbia	2	7^{7}	1^{r}
5	(United States) Michael Mmoh	6	6^{2}	4

Qualifying competition
3	(United States) Mitchell Krueger	6	6
5	(United States) Michael Mmoh	3	3

==== Fourth qualifier ====
First round
4	(Australia) Max Purcell	6	6
(United States) Donald Young	2	2
(Tunisia) Moez Echargui	6	4	7^{7}
6	(Chile) Gonzalo Lama	3	6	6^{5}

Qualifying competition
4	(Australia) Max Purcell	4	6	6
(Tunisia) Moez Echargui	6	3	3
