= 2022 U.S. Men's Clay Court Championships – Doubles =

Doubles
- 2022 U.S. Men's Clay Court Championships

Final
- Champions: (Australia) Matthew Ebden (Australia) Max Purcell
- Runners-up: (Serbia) Ivan Sabanov (Serbia) Matej Sabanov
- Score: 6–3, 6–3

Details
- Draw: 16
- Seeds: 4

Events
Singles	Doubles
- U.S. Men's Clay Court Championships

Matthew Ebden and Max Purcell defeated Ivan and Matej Sabanov in the final, 6–3, 6–3 to win the doubles tennis title at the 2022 U.S. Men's Clay Court Championships. They did not drop a set en route to their first ATP Tour doubles title as a team (also Purcell's first career ATP title overall, and Ebden's fifth).

Santiago González and Aisam-ul-Haq Qureshi were the defending champions from when the tournament was last held in 2019, but only González chose to defend his title, partnering with Łukasz Kubot, while Qureshi competed in Marrakesh instead. González lost in the first round to Robert Galloway and Jackson Withrow.

== Seeds ==
1. (Australia) Matthew Ebden / (Australia) Max Purcell (champions)
2. (Mexico) Santiago González / (Poland) Łukasz Kubot (first round)
3. (Australia) Nick Kyrgios / (United States) Jack Sock (quarterfinals)
4. (Mexico) Hans Hach Verdugo / (United States) Austin Krajicek (first round)

== Draw ==
Key

- Q = Qualifier
- WC = Wild card
- LL = Lucky loser
- Alt = Alternate
- ITF = ITF entry
- PR = Protected ranking
- SR = Special ranking
- SE = Special exempt
- JE = Junior exempt
- JR = Junior Accelerator Programme entrant
- CO = College Accelerator Programme entrant
- NG = Next Gen Accelerator Program entrant
- w/o = Walkover
- r = Retired
- d = Defaulted

=== Draw ===
First round
1	(Australia) M Ebden (Australia) M Purcell	6	6
(United States) S Johnson (United States) S Querrey	2	2
(United States) N Monroe (Brazil) F Romboli	6	6
(France) S Doumbia (France) F Reboul	3	4
4	(Mexico) H Hach Verdugo (United States) A Krajicek	5	6	[8]
(Australia) L Saville (Australia) J-P Smith	7	2	[10]
(Uruguay) P Cuevas (United States) H Reese	6	7^{8}
(United States) M McDonald (United States) T Paul	4	6^{6}
(Philippines) T Huey (United States) D Kudla	6	3	[7]
(Serbia) I Sabanov (Serbia) M Sabanov	3	6	[10]
(Sweden) A Göransson (United States) N Lammons	5	6	[5]
3/WC	(Australia) N Kyrgios (United States) J Sock	7	3	[10]
(Ecuador) D Hidalgo (Chile) A Tabilo	5	6	[7]
WC	(United States) W Blumberg (United States) M Schnur	7	4	[10]
(United States) R Galloway (United States) J Withrow	6	6
2	(Mexico) S González (Poland) Ł Kubot	4	4

Quarterfinals
1	(Australia) M Ebden (Australia) M Purcell	6	6
(United States) N Monroe (Brazil) F Romboli	2	2
(Australia) L Saville (Australia) J-P Smith	7	3	[4]
(Uruguay) P Cuevas (United States) H Reese	5	6	[10]
(Serbia) I Sabanov (Serbia) M Sabanov	6	6
3/WC	(Australia) N Kyrgios (United States) J Sock	4	2
WC	(United States) W Blumberg (United States) M Schnur	6	6
(United States) R Galloway (United States) J Withrow	4	3

Semifinals
1	(Australia) M Ebden (Australia) M Purcell	6	6
(Uruguay) P Cuevas (United States) H Reese	4	3
(Serbia) I Sabanov (Serbia) M Sabanov	6	7
WC	(United States) W Blumberg (United States) M Schnur	3	5

Final
1	(Australia) M Ebden (Australia) M Purcell	6	6
(Serbia) I Sabanov (Serbia) M Sabanov	3	3
