= 2021 Cary Challenger II – Singles =

Singles
- 2021 Cary Challenger II

Final
- Champion: (United States) Mitchell Krueger
- Runner-up: (United States) Bjorn Fratangelo
- Score: 6–4, 6–3

Events
Singles	Doubles
- Cary Challenger

Mitchell Krueger was the defending champion and successfully defended his title.

Krueger won the title after defeating Bjorn Fratangelo 6–4, 6–3 in the final.

== Seeds ==
1. (United States) Tennys Sandgren (first round, defaulted)
2. (United States) Denis Kudla (semifinals)
3. (Italy) Salvatore Caruso (second round)
4. (Australia) Alex Bolt (first round)
5. (Chinese Taipei) Jason Jung (first round)
6. (United States) Mitchell Krueger (champion)
7. (United States) Michael Mmoh (quarterfinals)
8. (United States) Bjorn Fratangelo (final)

== Draw ==
Key

- Q = Qualifier
- WC = Wild card
- LL = Lucky loser
- Alt = Alternate
- ITF = ITF entry
- PR = Protected ranking
- SR = Special ranking
- SE = Special exempt
- JE = Junior exempt
- JR = Junior Accelerator Programme entrant
- CO = College Accelerator Programme entrant
- NG = Next Gen Accelerator Program entrant
- w/o = Walkover
- r = Retired
- d = Defaulted

=== Finals ===
Semifinals
8	(United States) Bjorn Fratangelo	6^{2}	7^{7}	6
(Australia) Aleksandar Vukic	7^{7}	6^{4}	2
6	(United States) Mitchell Krueger	6	3	7^{7}
2	(United States) Denis Kudla	2	6	6^{2}

Final
8	(United States) Bjorn Fratangelo	4	3
6	(United States) Mitchell Krueger	6	6

=== Top half ===
First round
1	(United States) T Sandgren	1^{d}
(United States) C Eubanks	0
(United Kingdom) R Peniston	6	6
(Canada) P Polansky	3	2
(United States) U Blanch	5	0
Q	(Japan) S Mochizuki	7	6
Q	(United States) A Sarkissian	2	7	1
8	(United States) B Fratangelo	6	5	6
3	(Italy) S Caruso	6	6
(United States) C Harrison	3	3
(United States) Mi Redlicki	4	4
(Australia) A Vukic	6	6
(United States) S Kozlov	5	0^{r}
WC	(United States) Z Svajda	7	2
Q	(Australia) R Hijikata	6	6
5	(Chinese Taipei) J Jung	4	4

Second round
(United States) C Eubanks	6	6^{6}	4
(United Kingdom) R Peniston	4	7^{8}	6
Q	(Japan) S Mochizuki	2	1
8	(United States) B Fratangelo	6	6
3	(Italy) S Caruso	2	4
(Australia) A Vukic	6	6
WC	(United States) Z Svajda	7	6
Q	(Australia) R Hijikata	5	3

Quarterfinals
(United Kingdom) R Peniston	3	5
8	(United States) B Fratangelo	6	7
(Australia) A Vukic	3	6	6
WC	(United States) Z Svajda	6	2	3

Semifinals
8	(United States) B Fratangelo	6^{2}	7^{7}	6
(Australia) A Vukic	7^{7}	6^{4}	2

=== Bottom half ===
First round
6	(United States) M Krueger	6	6
(Australia) J Kubler	3	2
(Colombia) N Mejía	4	4
(Australia) D Kelly	6	6
(United States) JC Aragone	3	6	6
(Denmark) M Torpegaard	6	2	3
(Australia) M Purcell	6	6
4	(Australia) A Bolt	4	1
7	(United States) M Mmoh	6	6
(United States) N Rubin	1	3
WC	(Switzerland) Luca Stäheli	3	7	1
(India) M Sasikumar	6	5	6
Q	(United States) A Kovacevic	7^{7}	6
WC	(United States) G Johns	6^{3}	4
(United States) D Young	6^{3}	6	2
2	(United States) D Kudla	7^{7}	4	6

Second round
6	(United States) M Krueger	6	6
(Australia) D Kelly	4	4
(United States) JC Aragone	2	2
(Australia) M Purcell	6	6
7	(United States) M Mmoh	6	6
(India) M Sasikumar	4	4
Q	(United States) A Kovacevic	7^{7}	2	3
2	(United States) D Kudla	6^{2}	6	6

Quarterfinals
6	(United States) M Krueger	6	6
(Australia) M Purcell	3	2
7	(United States) M Mmoh	6^{3}	3
2	(United States) D Kudla	7^{7}	6

Semifinals
6	(United States) M Krueger	6	3	7^{7}
2	(United States) D Kudla	2	6	6^{2}
