= 2019 Cary Challenger – Singles =

Singles
- 2019 Cary Challenger

Final
- Champion: (Italy) Andreas Seppi
- Runner-up: (United States) Michael Mmoh
- Score: 6–2, 6–7^{(4–7)}, 6–3

Events
Singles	Doubles
- Cary Challenger

James Duckworth was the defending champion but chose not to defend his title.

Andreas Seppi won the title after defeating Michael Mmoh 6–2, 6–7^{(4–7)}, 6–3 in the final.

== Seeds ==
All seeds receive a bye into the second round.

1. (Italy) Andreas Seppi (champion)
2. (United States) Tommy Paul (quarterfinals)
3. (United States) Bjorn Fratangelo (third round, withdrew)
4. (United States) Marcos Giron (second round, retired)
5. (France) Enzo Couacaud (semifinals)
6. (Denmark) Mikael Torpegaard (third round)
7. (United States) Mitchell Krueger (second round)
8. (United States) Christopher Eubanks (third round)
9. (Canada) Peter Polansky (second round)
10. (United States) Noah Rubin (quarterfinals)
11. (United States) Michael Mmoh (final)
12. (United States) Donald Young (third round)
13. (United States) Thai-Son Kwiatkowski (second round)
14. (Colombia) Daniel Elahi Galán (second round)
15. (Japan) Yosuke Watanuki (withdrew)
16. (Australia) John-Patrick Smith (third round)

== Draw ==
Key

- Q = Qualifier
- WC = Wild card
- LL = Lucky loser
- Alt = Alternate
- ITF = ITF entry
- PR = Protected ranking
- SR = Special ranking
- SE = Special exempt
- JE = Junior exempt
- JR = Junior Accelerator Programme entrant
- CO = College Accelerator Programme entrant
- NG = Next Gen Accelerator Program entrant
- w/o = Walkover
- r = Retired
- d = Defaulted

=== Finals ===
Quarterfinals
1	(Italy) Andreas Seppi	6	6
10	(United States) Noah Rubin	0	4
(Canada) Filip Peliwo	3	3
5	(France) Enzo Couacaud	6	6
(United States) JC Aragone	6^{6}	7^{7}	2
(United States) Ulises Blanch	7^{8}	6^{5}	2^{r}
11	(United States) Michael Mmoh	2	7^{8}	6
2	(United States) Tommy Paul	6	6^{6}	1

Semifinals
1	(Italy) Andreas Seppi	4	7^{10}	6
5	(France) Enzo Couacaud	6	6^{8}	4
(United States) JC Aragone	6	2	2
11	(United States) Michael Mmoh	4	6	6

Final
1	(Italy) Andreas Seppi	6	6^{4}	6
11	(United States) Michael Mmoh	2	7^{7}	3

=== Top half ===
==== Section 1 ====
First round
(United Kingdom) L Broady	6	6
Q	(Cyprus) P Chrysochos	3	0
(Colombia) N Mejía	4	7^{7}	6
(United States) S Bangoura	6	6^{1}	4
(United States) J. J. Wolf	4	3
(United States) Evan Song	6	6
(United States) Jordi Arconada	6^{8}	6	2
Alt	(Italy) L Caruana	7^{10}	1	6

Second round
1	(Italy) A Seppi	7^{7}	6
(United Kingdom) L Broady	6^{5}	3
(Colombia) N Mejía	4	5
16	(Australia) J-P Smith	6	7
10	(United States) N Rubin	6	6
(United States) E Song	3	3
Alt	(Italy) L Caruana	1	5
8	(United States) C Eubanks	6	7

Third round
1	(Italy) A Seppi	6	6
16	(Australia) J-P Smith	3	2
10	(United States) N Rubin	6	6^{3}	7^{7}
8	(United States) C Eubanks	4	7^{7}	6^{5}

Quarterfinals
1	(Italy) A Seppi	6	6
10	(United States) N Rubin	0	4

==== Section 2 ====
First round
WC	(United States) A Rybakov	4	2
(United States) Mi Redlicki	6	6
(United States) Roy Smith	4^{r}
(Canada) F Peliwo	5
(United States) A Ritschard	6^{6}	3
(Argentina) R Olivo	7^{8}	6
(United States) S Kirchheimer	4	6	2
(United States) K King	6	2	6

Second round
3	(United States) B Fratangelo	6	6
(United States) Mi Redlicki	4	3
(Canada) F Peliwo	1	7^{7}	6
14	(Colombia) DE Galán	6	6^{5}	4
12	(United States) D Young	6	6
(Argentina) R Olivo	4	3
(United States) K King	1	2
5	(France) E Couacaud	6	6

Third round
3	(United States) B Fratangelo
(Canada) F Peliwo	w/o
12	(United States) D Young	1	6	3
5	(France) E Couacaud	6	3	6

Quarterfinals
(Canada) F Peliwo	3	3
5	(France) E Couacaud	6	6

=== Bottom half ===
==== Section 3 ====
First round
(United States) D Nguyen	6	6
WC	(Canada) B Sigouin	1	3
(United States) JC Aragone	6	7^{7}
Q	(United States) Connor Farren	2	6^{5}
Alt	(United States) D Novikov	4	2
(United States) U Blanch	6	6
(Israel) B Patael	7	6
(United States) Harrison Adams	5	4

Second round
7	(United States) M Krueger	3	6	3
(United States) D Nguyen	6	3	6
(United States) JC Aragone	7^{7}	6
9	(Canada) P Polansky	6^{4}	4
Alt	(United States) Christian Langmo	3	3
(United States) U Blanch	6	6
(Israel) B Patael	2	7	0
4	(United States) M Giron	6	5	0^{r}

Third round
(United States) D Nguyen	3	2
(United States) JC Aragone	6	6
(United States) U Blanch	6	6
(Israel) B Patael	1	4

Quarterfinals
(United States) JC Aragone	6^{6}	7^{7}	2
(United States) U Blanch	7^{8}	6^{5}	2^{r}

==== Section 4 ====
First round
WC	(United States) O Kumar	3	1
(United States) Ma Redlicki	6	6
(France) Gabriel Petit	3	2
(United States) A Sarkissian	6	6
WC	(United States) B Nakashima	6	6
WC	(Lithuania) T Babelis	3	2
(United States) E Zhu	2	3
(United Kingdom) R Peniston	6	6

Second round
6	(Denmark) M Torpegaard	6	6^{9}	6
(United States) Ma Redlicki	4	7^{11}	2
(United States) A Sarkissian	7	6^{4}	0
11	(United States) M Mmoh	5	7^{7}	6
13	(United States) T-S Kwiatkowski	6^{4}	4
WC	(United States) B Nakashima	7^{7}	6
(United Kingdom) R Peniston	4	6^{3}
2	(United States) T Paul	6	7^{7}

Third round
6	(Denmark) M Torpegaard	1	4
11	(United States) M Mmoh	6	6
WC	(United States) B Nakashima	6^{0}	4
2	(United States) T Paul	7^{7}	6

Quarterfinals
11	(United States) M Mmoh	2	7^{8}	6
2	(United States) T Paul	6	6^{6}	1
