= 2022 U.S. Men's Clay Court Championships =

- Date: April 4–10
- Edition: 52nd
- Category: ATP Tour 250
- Draw: 28S / 16D
- Prize money: $665,330
- Surface: Clay / outdoor
- Location: Houston, TX, United States
- Venue: River Oaks Country Club

Champions

Singles
- (United States) Reilly Opelka

Doubles
- (Australia) Matthew Ebden / (Australia) Max Purcell
- U.S. Men's Clay Court Championships

The 2022 U.S. Men's Clay Court Championships (also known as the Fayez Sarofim & Co. U.S. Men's Clay Court Championships for sponsorship purposes) was a tennis tournament played on outdoor clay courts.

It was the 52nd edition of the U.S. Men's Clay Court Championships, and an ATP Tour 250 event on the 2022 ATP Tour. It was originally scheduled to take place at River Oaks Country Club in Houston, Texas, United States for April 6 through April 12, 2020, but this edition of the tournament was postponed to April 4 through April 10, 2022 due to the COVID-19 pandemic. Third-seeded Reilly Opelka won the singles title.

== Finals ==
=== Singles ===
(United States) Reilly Opelka defeated (United States) John Isner, 6–3, 7–6^{(9–7)}

- It was Opelka's 2nd and last singles title of the year and the 4th of his career.

=== Doubles ===
(Australia) Matthew Ebden / (Australia) Max Purcell defeated (Serbia) Ivan Sabanov / (Serbia) Matej Sabanov, 6–3, 6–3

== Point and prize money ==
=== Point ===
Event	W	F	SF	QF	Round of 16	Round of 32	Q	Q2	Q1
Singles	250	150	90	45	20	0	12	6	0
Doubles	250	150	90	45	0	—N/a	—N/a	—N/a	—N/a

=== Prize money ===
Event	W	F	SF	QF	Round of 16	Round of 32	Round of 64	Q2	Q1
Singles	$90,495	$52,790	$31,035	$17,985	$10,440	$6,380	—N/a	$3,190	$1,740
Doubles*	$31,440	$16,820	$9,860	$5,510	$3,250	—N/a	—N/a	—N/a	—N/a

_{*per team}

== Singles main draw entrants ==
=== Seeds ===
Country	Player	Rank^{1}	Seed
~~NOR~~	~~Casper Ruud~~	~~8~~	~~1~~
USA	Taylor Fritz	13	2
USA	Reilly Opelka	18	3
USA	John Isner	22	4
CHI	Cristian Garín	30	5
USA	Frances Tiafoe	31	6
USA	Tommy Paul	37	7
USA	Jenson Brooksby	39	8

- Rankings are as of March 21, 2022.

=== Other entrants ===
The following players received wildcards into the main draw:

- (Australia) Nick Kyrgios
- (United States) Jack Sock
- (United States) J. J. Wolf

The following players received entry via the qualifying draw:

- (Netherlands) Gijs Brouwer
- (United States) Christian Harrison
- (United States) Mitchell Krueger
- (Australia) Max Purcell

The following players received entry as a lucky loser:

- (Canada) Steven Diez
- (United States) Michael Mmoh

=== Withdrawals ===
Before the tournament

- (South Africa) Kevin Anderson → replaced by (Colombia) Daniel Elahi Galán
- (Argentina) Francisco Cerúndolo → replaced by (Peru) Juan Pablo Varillas
- (South Africa) Lloyd Harris → replaced by (United States) Sam Querrey
- (France) Adrian Mannarino → replaced by (United States) Steve Johnson
- (Spain) Jaume Munar → replaced by (Canada) Steven Diez
- (Norway) Casper Ruud → replaced by (United States) Michael Mmoh
- (South Korea) Kwon Soon-woo → replaced by (United States) Denis Kudla

== Doubles main draw entrants ==
=== Seeds ===
Country	Player	Country	Player	Rank^{1}	Seed
AUS	Matthew Ebden	AUS	Max Purcell	69	1
MEX	Santiago González	POL	Łukasz Kubot	84	2
AUS	Nick Kyrgios	USA	Jack Sock	94	3
MEX	Hans Hach Verdugo	USA	Austin Krajicek	101	4

- ^{1} Rankings as of March 21, 2022.

=== Other entrants ===
The following pairs received a wildcard into the doubles main draw:

- (United States) William Blumberg / (United States) Max Schnur
- (Australia) Nick Kyrgios / (United States) Jack Sock

=== Withdrawals ===
Before the tournament

- (United States) Nicholas Monroe / (United States) Frances Tiafoe → replaced by (United States) Nicholas Monroe / (Brazil) Fernando Romboli
- (United States) Marcos Giron / (United States) Hunter Reese → replaced by (Uruguay) Pablo Cuevas / (United States) Hunter Reese
