= 2022 Cary Challenger =

- Date: 12–18 September
- Edition: 9th
- Surface: Hard
- Location: Cary, North Carolina, United States

Champions

Singles
- (United States) Michael Mmoh

Doubles
- (United States) Nathaniel Lammons / (United States) Jackson Withrow
- Cary Challenger

The 2022 Cary Challenger was a professional tennis tournament being played on hard courts. It was the 9th edition of the tournament which was part of the 2022 ATP Challenger Tour. It took place in Cary, North Carolina, United States between 12 and 18 September 2022.

== Singles main-draw entrants ==
=== Seeds ===
Country	Player	Rank^{1}	Seed
USA	Denis Kudla	96	1
AUS	Jordan Thompson	102	2
USA	Stefan Kozlov	111	3
ARG	Juan Pablo Ficovich	128	4
ARG	Facundo Mena	131	5
AUS	Aleksandar Vukic	132	6
USA	Michael Mmoh	155	7
GER	Dominik Koepfer	161	8

- ^{1} Rankings are as of August 29, 2022.

=== Other entrants ===
The following players received wildcards into the singles main draw:

- (United States) Martin Damm
- (United States) Ryan Seggerman
- (United States) Braden Shick

The following players received entry into the singles main draw as alternates:

- (United States) Nick Chappell
- (United States) Tennys Sandgren

The following players received entry from the qualifying draw:

- (Estonia) Daniil Glinka
- (United States) Ryan Harrison
- (United States) Garrett Johns
- (United States) Cannon Kingsley
- (United Kingdom) Henry Patten
- (United States) Donald Young

== Champions ==
=== Singles ===
- (United States) Michael Mmoh def. (Germany) Dominik Koepfer 7–5, 6–3.

=== Doubles ===
- (United States) Nathaniel Lammons / (United States) Jackson Withrow def. (Philippines) Treat Huey / (Australia) John-Patrick Smith 7–5, 2–6, [10–5].
