= 2019 Cary Challenger =

- Date: 9–15 September
- Edition: 5th
- Draw: 48S / 16D
- Surface: Hard
- Location: Cary, North Carolina, United States

Champions

Singles
- (Italy) Andreas Seppi

Doubles
- (United States) Sekou Bangoura / (United States) Michael Mmoh
- Cary Challenger

The 2019 Cary Challenger was a professional tennis tournament played on hard courts. It was the 5th edition of the tournament which was part of the 2019 ATP Challenger Tour. It took place in Cary, North Carolina, United States between 9 and 15 September 2019.

== Singles main-draw entrants ==
=== Seeds ===
Country	Player	Rank^{1}	Seed
ITA	Andreas Seppi	77	1
USA	Tommy Paul	114	2
USA	Bjorn Fratangelo	117	3
USA	Marcos Giron	151	4
FRA	Enzo Couacaud	169	5
DEN	Mikael Torpegaard	173	6
USA	Mitchell Krueger	174	7
USA	Christopher Eubanks	188	8
CAN	Peter Polansky	192	9
USA	Noah Rubin	195	10
USA	Michael Mmoh	196	11
USA	Donald Young	197	12
USA	Thai-Son Kwiatkowski	204	13
COL	Daniel Elahi Galán	207	14
~~JPN~~	~~Yosuke Watanuki~~	~~229~~	~~15~~
AUS	John-Patrick Smith	241	16

- ^{1} Rankings are as of August 26, 2019.

=== Other entrants ===
The following players received wildcards into the singles main draw:

- (Lithuania) Tadas Babelis
- (United States) Omni Kumar
- (United States) Brandon Nakashima
- (United States) Alex Rybakov
- (Canada) Benjamin Sigouin

The following players received entry into the singles main draw as alternates:

- (Italy) Liam Caruana
- (United States) Christian Langmo
- (United States) Dennis Novikov

The following players received entry from the qualifying draw:

- (Cyprus) Petros Chrysochos
- (United States) Connor Farren

== Champions ==
=== Singles ===
- (Italy) Andreas Seppi def. (United States) Michael Mmoh 6–2, 6–7^{(4–7)}, 6–3.

=== Doubles ===
- (United States) Sekou Bangoura / (United States) Michael Mmoh def. (Philippines) Treat Huey / (Australia) John-Patrick Smith 4–6, 6–4, [10–8].
