= Dennis Novikov =

American tennis player

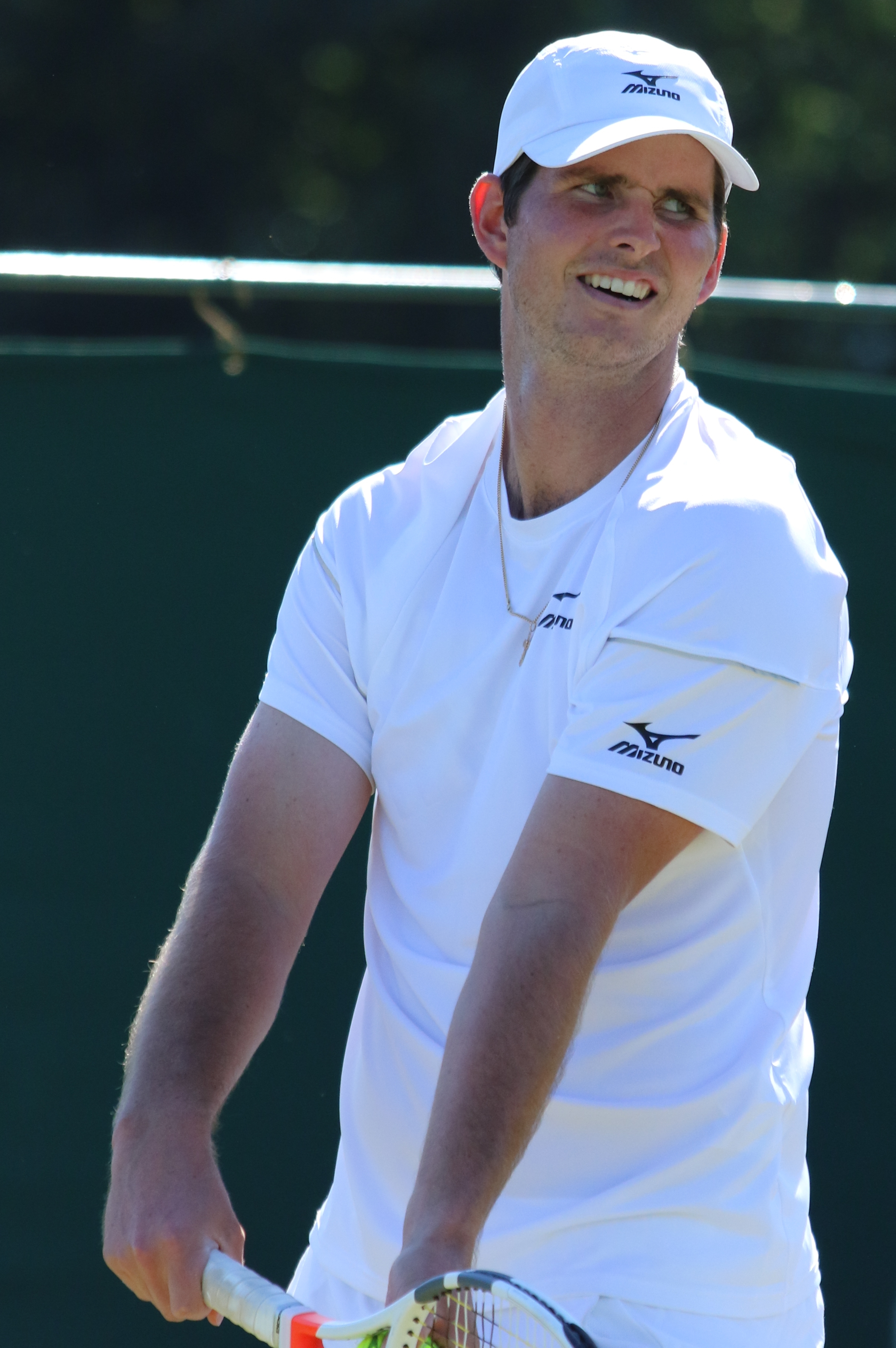
- Novikov at the 2018 Wimbledon Championships
- Country (sports): United States
- Residence: San Jose, California
- Born: November 6, 1993 (age 32) Moscow, Russia
- Height: 1.93 m (6 ft 4 in)
- Turned pro: 2013
- Plays: Right-handed (two-handed backhand)
- College: UCLA
- Prize money: $662,411

Singles
- Career record: 5–11
- Career titles: 0
- Highest ranking: No. 119 (15 August 2016)

Grand Slam singles results
- Australian Open: Q3 (2016)
- French Open: Q2 (2016, 2017)
- Wimbledon: 2R (2016)
- US Open: 2R (2012)

Doubles
- Career record: 4–7
- Career titles: 0
- Highest ranking: No. 138 (10 April 2017)

Grand Slam doubles results
- US Open: 2R (2012)

Grand Slam mixed doubles results
- US Open: QF (2016)
Medal record
Representing United States
Men's tennis
Pan American Games
Bronze medal – third place	2015 Toronto	Men's singles

Dennis Novikov (born November 6, 1993) is an American professional tennis player born in Russia.

He won both the singles and doubles titles at the USTA Boys 18s National Championships in Kalamazoo, Michigan in 2012. As a result, he was awarded wild cards into the main draw of the US Open in both singles and doubles. He did not join the UCLA tennis team until March 2012, first competing on March 27.

== Tennis career ==
Novikov won his first main-draw match at the US Open in 2012, defeating world no. 86 Jerzy Janowicz of Poland in four sets. In doubles, he teamed with Michael Redlicki. In the first round, they defeated compatriots Bobby Reynolds and Michael Russell in three sets, with a tie-break in the third set.

In 2015, he qualified for the main draw in Indian Wells. That year, Novikov also captured his first two titles on the ATP Challenger Tour in back-to-back weeks. He won the inaugural Cary Challenger the week of September 14 followed by the Columbus Challenger the week of September 21. Novikov defeated Ryan Harrison in both finals.

During the 2016 season, Novikov made his debut at Wimbledon by qualifying for the main draw. He advanced to the second round after defeating fellow qualifier Luke Saville in an opening round match.

== Challenger and Futures finals ==
=== Singles: 12 (9–3) ===
Legend (singles) ATP Challenger Tour (3–0) ITF Futures Tour (6–3)	Titles by surface Hard (8–3) Clay (1–0) Grass (0–0) Carpet (0–0)

Result	W–L	Date	Tournament	Tier	Surface	Opponent	Score
Win	1–0	Jun 2013	USA F16, Amelia Island	Futures	Clay	(United States) Jarmere Jenkins	1–6, 7–6^{(7–5)}, 6–4
Loss	1–1	Sep 2013	USA F23, Claremont	Futures	Hard	(United States) Marcos Giron	0–6, 5–7
Win	2–1	May 2014	Mexico F5, Ciudad Obregón	Futures	Hard	(United States) Daniel Nguyen	3–6, 6–3, 7–5
Win	3–1	Jun 2014	Canada F3, Richmond	Futures	Hard	(Canada) Filip Peliwo	1–6, 6–4, 6–4
Loss	3–2	Sep 2014	USA F25, Costa Mesa	Futures	Hard	(United States) Jarmere Jenkins	4–6, 2–6
Loss	3–3	Oct 2014	USA F29, Brownsville	Futures	Hard	(United States) Michael Mmoh	6–7^{(5–7)}, 1–6
Win	4–3	Dec 2014	Mexico F14, Mérida	Futures	Hard	(Ecuador) Giovanni Lapentti	6–3, 6–7^{(7–9)}, 7–6^{(7–3)}
Win	5–3	Dec 2014	Mexico F15, Mérida	Futures	Hard	(Canada) Philip Bester	6–4, 6–4
Win	6–3	Mar 2015	USA F11, Calabasas	Futures	Hard	(United States) Frances Tiafoe	7–6^{(7–4)}, 7–6^{(8–6)}
Win	7–3	Sep 2015	Cary, USA	Challenger	Hard	(United States) Ryan Harrison	6–4, 7–5
Win	8–3	Sep 2015	Columbus, USA	Challenger	Hard (i)	(United States) Ryan Harrison	6–4, 3–6, 6–3
Win	9–3	Feb 2018	Cuernavaca, Mexico	Challenger	Hard	(Chile) Cristian Garín	6–4, 6–3

=== Doubles: 27 (15–12) ===
Legend (doubles) ATP Challenger Tour (8–7) ITF Futures Tour (7–5)	Titles by surface Hard (11–10) Clay (4–2) Grass (0–0) Carpet (0–0)

Result	W–L	Date	Tournament	Tier	Surface	Partner	Opponents	Score
Win	1–0	Oct 2010	USA F25, Irvine	Futures	Hard	(United States) Nathaniel Gorham	(United Kingdom) Matthew Brooklyn (United States) Ryan Young	def.
Win	2–0	Jan 2012	USA F3, Weston	Futures	Clay	(United States) Daniel Kosakowski	(United States) Vahid Mirzadeh (United States) Michael Shabaz	6–4, 7–6^{(7–4)}
Loss	2–1	Sep 2012	USA F26, Irvine	Futures	Hard	(United States) Marcos Giron	(United States) Devin Britton (United States) Austin Krajicek	2–6 ret.
Loss	2–2	Jun 2013	USA F17, Rochester	Futures	Clay	(United States) Marcos Giron	(United States) Chase Buchanan (Brazil) Fernando Romboli	2–6, 3–6
Loss	2–3	Mar 2014	USA F9, Calabasas	Futures	Hard	(United States) Connor Smith	(United States) Sekou Bangoura (United States) Evan King	4–6, 4–6
Win	3–3	May 2014	USA F13, Orange Park	Futures	Clay	(United States) Connor Smith	(United States) Bjorn Fratangelo (United States) Mitchell Krueger	6–3, 6–2
Win	4–3	Jun 2014	USA F15, Tulsa	Futures	Hard	(United States) Eric Quigley	(United States) Jared Donaldson (Libya) Fares Ghasya	7–6^{(7–5)}, 6–3
Win	5–3	Oct 2014	USA F28, Mansfield	Futures	Hard	(United Kingdom) Liam Broady	(Brazil) Henrique Cunha (Bulgaria) Dimitar Kutrovsky	4–6, 6–3, [10–7]
Loss	5–4	Dec 2014	Mexico F14, Mérida	Futures	Hard	(United States) Clay Thompson	(El Salvador) Marcelo Arévalo (Italy) Claudio Grassi	2–6, 4–6
Win	6–4	Jan 2015	USA F2, Los Angeles	Futures	Hard	(Bulgaria) Dimitar Kutrovsky	(Republic of Ireland) James Cluskey (Denmark) Frederik Nielsen	4–6, 6–1, [10–4]
Loss	6–5	Jan 2015	USA F4, Long Beach	Futures	Hard	(Bulgaria) Dimitar Kutrovsky	(United States) Nicolas Meister (United States) Eric Quigley	3–6, 2–6
Loss	6–6	Apr 2015	Savannah, USA	Challenger	Clay	(Chile) Julio Peralta	(Argentina) Guillermo Durán (Argentina) Horacio Zeballos	4–6, 3–6
Win	7–6	May 2015	Tallahassee, USA	Challenger	Clay	(Chile) Julio Peralta	(India) Somdev Devvarman (India) Sanam Singh	6–2, 6–4
Loss	7–7	Jul 2015	Binghamton, USA	Challenger	Hard	(United States) Daniel Nguyen	(South Africa) Dean O'Brien (South Africa) Ruan Roelofse	1–6, 6–7^{(0–7)}
Win	8–7	Jan 2016	Maui, USA	Challenger	Hard	(Chinese Taipei) Jason Jung	(Australia) Alex Bolt (Germany) Frank Moser	6–3, 4–6, [10–8]
Win	9–7	Apr 2016	Tallahassee, USA	Challenger	Clay	(Chile) Julio Peralta	(Australia) Peter Luczak (Australia) Marc Polmans	3–6, 6–4, [12–10]
Win	10–7	Sep 2016	Columbus, USA	Challenger	Hard (i)	(Latvia) Miķelis Lībietis	(Canada) Philip Bester (Canada) Peter Polansky	7–5, 7–6^{(7–4)}
Loss	10–8	Oct 2016	Tiburon, USA	Challenger	Hard	(France) Quentin Halys	(Australia) Matt Reid (Australia) John-Patrick Smith	1–6, 2–6
Loss	10–9	Sep 2017	Cary, USA	Challenger	Hard	(Latvia) Miķelis Lībietis	(El Salvador) Marcelo Arévalo (Mexico) Miguel Ángel Reyes-Varela	7–6^{(8–6)}, 6–7^{(1–7)}, [6–10]
Loss	10–10	Oct 2017	Las Vegas, USA	Challenger	Hard	(Mexico) Hans Hach	(United Kingdom) Brydan Klein (United Kingdom) Joe Salisbury	3–6, 6–4, [3–10]
Win	11–10	Feb 2019	Dallas, USA	Challenger	Hard (i)	(United States) Marcos Giron	(Croatia) Ante Pavić (South Africa) Ruan Roelofse	6–4, 7–6^{(7–3)}
Loss	11–11	Jul 2019	Gatineau, Canada	Challenger	Hard	(Mexico) Hans Hach	(United States) Alex Lawson (Australia) Marc Polmans	4–6, 6–3, [7–10]
Win	12–11	Dec 2019	M15 Tallahassee, USA	World Tennis Tour	Hard	(United States) Strong Kirchheimer	(United Kingdom) Ryan Peniston (United Kingdom) Jack Findel-hawkins	7–5, 6–3
Win	13–11	Feb 2020	Dallas, USA	Challenger	Hard	(Portugal) Gonçalo Oliveira	(Venezuela) Luis David Martinez (Mexico) Miguel Ángel Reyes-Varela	6–3, 6–4
Win	14–11	Nov 2020	Cary, USA	Challenger	Hard	(Russia) Teymuraz Gabashvili	(United Kingdom) Luke Bambridge (United States) Nathaniel Lammons	7–5, 4–6, [10–8]
Loss	14–12	Apr 2021	Orlando, USA	Challenger	Hard	(United States) Christian Harrison	(United States) Jack Sock (United States) Mitchell Krueger	6–4, 5–7, [11–13]
Win	15–12	Jul 2021	Cary, USA	Challenger	Hard	(United States) Christian Harrison	(Cyprus) Petros Chrysochos (Greece) Michail Pervolarakis	6–3, 6–3
