= Michael Mmoh =

American tennis player

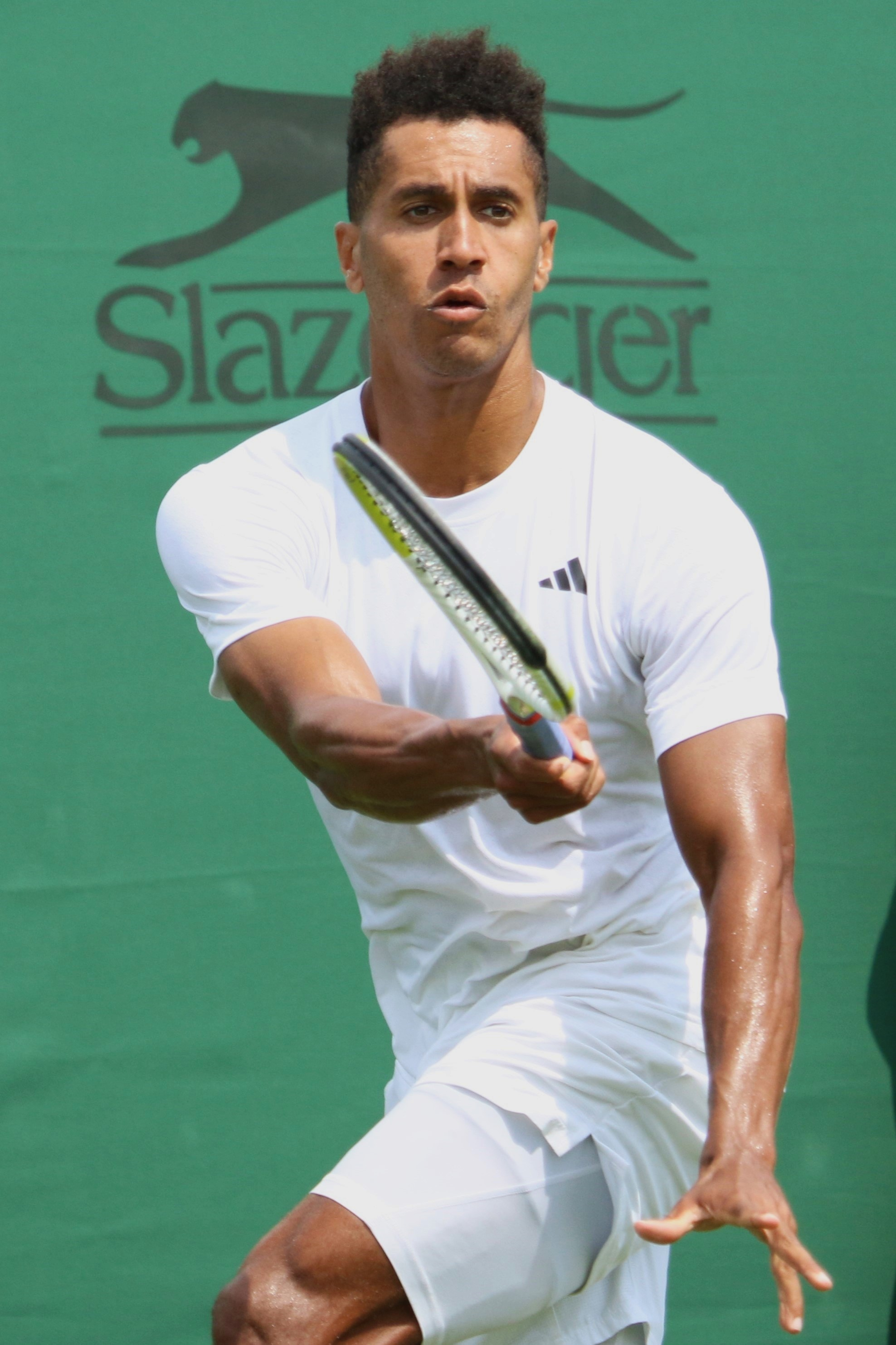
- Mmoh at the 2023 Wimbledon Championships
- Country (sports): United States
- Residence: Bradenton, Florida, US
- Born: January 10, 1998 (age 28) Riyadh, Saudi Arabia
- Height: 6 ft 2 in (1.88 m)
- Turned pro: 2016
- Plays: Right-handed (two-handed backhand)
- Coach: Andrés Alarcón
- Prize money: US $2,450,185

Singles
- Career record: 33–44
- Career titles: 0
- Highest ranking: No. 81 (September 11, 2023)
- Current ranking: No. 173 (August 31, 2026)

Grand Slam singles results
- Australian Open: 3R (2023)
- French Open: 1R (2020, 2022, 2023)
- Wimbledon: 2R (2023)
- US Open: 3R (2023)

Doubles
- Career record: 3–6
- Career titles: 0
- Highest ranking: No. 265 (April 12, 2021)

Grand Slam doubles results
- US Open: 2R (2014)

Grand Slam mixed doubles results
- US Open: 1R (2017, 2018)
- Last updated on: September 1, 2026.

Michael Mmoh (/moʊ/ MOH; born January 10, 1998) is an American professional tennis player. Mmoh has a career-high ATP singles ranking of No. 81 achieved on September 11, 2023 and a doubles ranking of No. 265 achieved on April 12, 2021. He won the USTA junior national championship in 2016.

== Personal life ==
Born in Saudi Arabia, where he lived until the age of 13, Mmoh has both Irish and Nigerian ancestry. Michael's father Tony Mmoh was also a professional tennis player who represented Nigeria and reached a career-high ranking of No.105. His mother was born in Ireland and is also an Australian citizen. Mmoh's parents named him after basketball superstar Michael Jordan.

Mmoh began playing tennis at age 3. He trains at the IMG Academy in Florida.

Mmoh married his girlfriend, Croatian tennis player and IMG Academy tennis instructor Klara Mrcela on September 9, 2024. The couple had been engaged two years prior in December of 2022.

== Junior career ==
Mmoh peaked in the junior rankings at No. 2 after reaching the semifinals at the 2015 Junior French Open, where he lost to eventual champion Tommy Paul. He won the 2016 USTA 18s Boys' National Championship to earn a wild card into the main draw of the US Open.

== Professional career ==
=== Early career ===
Mmoh enjoyed early success on the ITF Futures tour, winning three titles before turning 18.

=== 2016–17: ATP, Grand Slam and top 200 debut ===
In February 2016, Mmoh qualified for his first ATP-level tournament at Memphis by defeating fellow Americans Dennis Novikov and Bjorn Fratangelo. He then lost in the first round to eventual finalist Taylor Fritz, the highest ranked American teenager at the time. Following his fourth Futures title, Mmoh was awarded a wildcard into the Miami Masters, where he lost to Alexander Zverev, the top-ranked 18 year-old in the world, after dropping two tiebreaks.

In September 2016, Mmoh broke into the top 300 for the first time by reaching the final of the ATP Challenger event at Tiburon as a qualifier.

In November 2016, he reached the Top 200 and also won the 2017 Australian Open Wild Card Challenge largely by winning his first career Challenger title at Knoxville. He would claim another Challenger title the following summer in August 2017 at Lexington.

=== 2018: Top 100, First ATP wins & quarterfinals, Masters third round ===
To start off the 2018 season, Mmoh recorded his first career ATP-level match wins by defeating Federico Delbonis in the first round of the Brisbane International and world No. 33 Mischa Zverev to make the quarterfinals, where he lost to Alex de Minaur.

At the 2018 Miami Open he reached the third round as a qualifier for the first time at a Masters level defeating 12th seed Roberto Bautista Agut for his first top-15 win and the biggest of his career.

He entered the main draw at the 2018 Wimbledon Championships for the first time at this Grand Slam as a lucky loser. He reached the top 100 at World No. 97 on 1 October 2018.

=== 2019–20: First Grand Slam win ===
In January 2019, Mmoh qualified for the first time via ranking in a Grand Slam main draw at the 2019 Australian Open where he lost in the first round to Radu Albot.

At the 2020 Australian Open, Mmoh recorded his first main draw victory with a straight sets win over Pablo Andújar as a wildcard. Following his Australian Open performance, Mmoh qualified for the main draw at the 2020 US Open, where he won his first round match against João Sousa in four sets, and also at the 2020 French Open, where he lost in the first round.

=== 2021–22: ATP quarterfinal, Out of top 250 ===
At the 2021 Australian Open he reached again the second round in a five set stunning comeback against Viktor Troicki but lost to second seed Rafael Nadal in the next round.

He received a wildcard for the 2021 Miami Open.

In 2022, he entered the 2022 U.S. Men's Clay Court Championships as a lucky loser directly into the second round replacing top seed Casper Ruud who withdrew in the last minute. He won his first match defeating Sam Querrey to reach the quarterfinals but withdrew due to injury.

Mmoh won a wildcard entry into the main draw at the 2022 French Open by winning the Roland Garros wildcard challenge.

=== 2023–24: Best season: Two Major third rounds, ATP quarterfinal, top 85, hiatus ===
Mmoh's first tournament of the year was in Pune, where he defeated local wildcard Manas Dhamne in the first round before losing to the 6th seed, Filip Krajinović in the second round.

He then entered the 2023 Australian Open as a lucky loser after the withdrawal of David Goffin and won his first round match, defeating fellow qualifier French Laurent Lokoli, after saving a match point in the third set. He then defeated 12th seed Alexander Zverev in the second round. He became the fifth player to make it as a lucky loser to the third round; the furthest a lucky loser had made it at this Major is the fourth round (Stéphane Robert in 2014). As a result he moved up 25 positions back into the top 100 to a new career-high singles ranking of No. 83 on 30 January 2023.

In February, he lost in the first round at the Dallas Open to eventual champion Yibing Wu. The following week, he reached the round of 16 at the Delray Beach Open by defeating wildcard Aleksandar Kovacevic in three sets. He then reached the quarterfinals after upsetting third seed Denis Shapovalov, also in three sets. As a result, he reached a new career high ranking of No. 82 on 20 February 2023.

In early March, Mmoh suffered a leg injury at the Mexican Open during his second round match against Tommy Paul and did not return to competition until May at the French Open, where he lost in the first round to ninth seed Taylor Fritz. He entered the 2023 Wimbledon Championships as a lucky loser again and defeated 11th seed Félix Auger-Aliassime in the first round.

In July 2023, in Washington, D.C., he defeated world No. 17 Hubert Hurkacz, and in Winston-Salem he beat Marcos Giron as a wildcard. Next he defeated 11th seed Karen Khachanov in the first and John Isner in the second round of the US Open. It was Isner's last singles match before retiring from professional tennis.

=== 2025: Out of top 400, comeback to the ATP Tour ===
He fell out of the top 400 on 3 February 2025. Ranked No. 422, Mmoh qualified for the main draw with a win over wildcard Georgi Georgiev at the 2025 Dallas Open, and then defeated Roberto Carballes Baena in the first round. It was Mmoh's first tour-level win since April 2024 in Houston as the 27-year-old missed the second half of the 2024 season with an elbow injury. He moved more than 90 positions back up in the singles rankings into the top 330 on 10 February 2025.

Mmoh qualified for the main draw of the Delray Beach Open defeating Radu Albot and Dmitry Popko. He then beat Alexander Shevchenko to reach the second round, where he retired against Alex Michelsen after winning the first set.

== Singles performance timeline ==
Key
W	F	SF	QF	#R	RR	Q#	P#	DNQ	A	Z#	PO	G	S	B	NMS	NTI	P	NH

(W) winner; (F) finalist; (SF) semifinalist; (QF) quarterfinalist; (#R) rounds 4, 3, 2, 1; (RR) round-robin stage; (Q#) qualification round; (DNQ) did not qualify; (A) absent; (NH) not held; (SR) strike rate (events won / competed); (W–L) win–loss record.
To avoid confusion and double counting, these charts are updated at the conclusion of a tournament or when the player's participation has ended.

Current through the 2025 U.S. Men's Clay Court Championships.

Tournament	2014	2015	2016	2017	2018	2019	2020	2021	2022	2023	2024	2025	SR	W–L	Win%
Grand Slam tournaments
Australian Open	A	A	A	1R	Q1	1R	2R	2R	Q1	3R	Q1	A	0 / 5	4–5	44%
French Open	A	A	A	Q1	A	Q1	1R	Q1	1R	1R	A	Q2	0 / 3	0–3	0%
Wimbledon	A	A	A	Q1	1R	Q1	NH	A	Q2	2R	A	A	0 / 2	1–2	33%
US Open	A	Q1	1R	Q3	1R	Q1	2R	Q1	Q1	3R	A	A	0 / 4	3–4	43%
Win–loss	0–0	0–0	0–1	0–1	0–2	0–1	2–3	1–1	0–1	5–4	0–0	0–0	0 / 14	8–14	36%
ATP Masters 1000
Indian Wells Masters	A	A	Q1	Q1	Q1	A	NH	Q1	A	A	Q1	Q2	0 / 0	0–0	–
Miami Open	A	Q1	1R	1R	3R	A	NH	1R	Q1	A	Q1	Q1	0 / 4	2–4	33%
Monte Carlo Masters	A	A	A	A	A	A	NH	A	A	A	A	A	0 / 0	0–0	–
Madrid Open	A	A	A	A	A	A	NH	A	A	A	A	A	0 / 0	0–0	–
Italian Open	A	A	A	A	A	A	A	A	A	A	A	A	0 / 0	0–0	–
Canadian Open	A	A	Q1	A	A	A	NH	Q1	Q1	A	A	A	0 / 0	0–0	–
Cincinnati Masters	A	A	A	A	1R	A	Q1	A	A	A	A	A	0 / 1	0–1	0%
Shanghai Masters	A	A	A	A	A	A	NH			A	A	A	0 / 0	0–0	–
Paris Masters	A	A	A	A	A	A	A	A	A	A	A		0 / 0	0–0	–
Win–loss	0–0	0–0	0–1	0–1	2–2	0–0	0–0	0–1	0–0	0–0	0–0	0–0	0 / 5	2–5	29%
Career statistics
Tournaments	0	0	3	4	6	2	4	4	4	10	4	3	Career total: 44		
Overall win–loss	0–0	0–0	0–3	0–4	6–6	1–2	2–4	1–4	1–3	13–10	5–4	2–3	0 / 44	31–43	42%
Year-end ranking	659	455	197	175	103	218	174	239	113	105	317		$2,097,869		

== ATP Challenger and ITF Futures finals ==
=== Singles: 22 (12 titles, 10 runner-ups) ===
Legend ATP Challenger Tour (8–8) ITF Futures (4–2)	Finals by surface Hard (12–9) Clay (0–1) Grass (0–0) Carpet (0–0)

Result	W–L	Date	Tournament	Tier	Surface	Opponent	Score
Loss	0–1	Oct 2016	Tiburon Challenger, USA	Challenger	Hard	(Barbados) Darian King	6–7^{(5–7)}, 2–6
Win	1–1	Nov 2016	Knoxville Challenger, USA	Challenger	Hard (i)	(Canada) Peter Polansky	7–5, 2–6, 6–1
Win	2–1	Aug 2017	Lexington Challenger, USA	Challenger	Hard	(Australia) John Millman	4–6, 7–6^{(7–3)}, 6–3
Win	3–1	Sep 2018	Columbus Challenger, USA	Challenger	Hard (i)	(Australia) Jordan Thompson	6–3, 7–6^{(7–4)}
Win	4–1	Sep 2018	Tiburon Challenger, USA	Challenger	Hard	(Spain) Marcel Granollers	6–3, 7–5
Loss	4–2	Sep 2019	Cary Challenger, USA	Challenger	Hard	(Italy) Andreas Seppi	2–6, 7–6^{(7–4)}, 3–6
Win	5–2	Nov 2019	Knoxville Challenger, USA (2)	Challenger	Hard (i)	(Australia) Christopher O'Connell	6–4, 6–4
Loss	5–3	Apr 2022	Tallahassee Tennis Challenger, USA	Challenger	Clay (green)	(Chinese Taipei) Wu Tung-lin	3–6, 4–6
Win	6–3	Sep 2022	Cary Challenger, USA	Challenger	Hard	(Germany) Dominik Koepfer	7–5, 6–3
Win	7–3	Oct 2022	Fairfield Challenger, USA	Challenger	Hard	(Canada) Gabriel Diallo	6–3, 6–2
Loss	7–4	Nov 2022	Challenger de Drummondville, Canada	Challenger	Hard (i)	(Canada) Vasek Pospisil	6–7^{(5–7)}, 6–4, 4–6
Loss	7–5	Nov 2023	Yokkaichi Challenger, Japan	Challenger	Hard	(Belgium) Zizou Bergs	2–6, 6–7^{(2–7)}
Win	8–5	Mar 2026	Morelos Open, Mexico	Challenger	Hard	(Japan) Taro Daniel	4–6, 6–4, 6–3
Loss	8–6	May 2026	Côte d'Ivoire Open II, Ivory Coast	Challenger	Hard	(Belgium) Gauthier Onclin	3–6, 4–6
Loss	8–7	May 2026	Little Rock Challenger, USA	Challenger	Hard	(United States) Colton Smith	2–6, 4–6
Loss	8–8	Sep 2026	Tiburon Challenger, USA	Challenger	Hard	(United States) Darwin Blanch	6–3, 4–6, 2–6

Result	W–L	Date	Tournament	Tier	Surface	Opponent	Score
Win	1–0	Oct 2014	USA F29, Brownsville	Futures	Hard	(United States) Dennis Novikov	7–6^{(7–5)}, 6–1
Win	2–0	Jul 2015	USA F22, Godfrey	Futures	Hard	(United States) Jared Hiltzik	6–3, 3–6, 7–5
Win	3–0	Oct 2015	USA F30, Houston	Futures	Hard	(Mexico) Lucas Gómez	6–3, 6–2
Loss	3–1	Jan 2016	USA F2, Long Beach	Futures	Hard	(Germany) Yannick Hanfmann	4–6, 0–6
Win	4–1	Mar 2016	USA F10, Bakerfield	Futures	Hard	(Norway) Casper Ruud	6–4, 6–7^{(5–7)}, 6–1
Loss	4–2	Jul 2017	USA F23, Wichita	Futures	Hard	(United States) Christian Harrison	6–1, 2–6, 5–7

=== Doubles: 1 (1 title) ===
Legend ATP Challenger Tour (1–0)

Result	W–L	Date	Tournament	Tier	Surface	Partner	Opponents	Score
Win	1–0	Sep 2019	Cary Challenger, USA	Challenger	Hard	(United States) Sekou Bangoura	(Philippines) Treat Huey (Australia) John-Patrick Smith	4–6, 6–4, [10–8]
