= Cary Tennis Classic =

- 2026 Cary Tennis Classic

Tournament information
- Event name: Cary Tennis Classic (2024–); Atlantic Tire Championships (2015–2023)
- Location: Cary, United States
- Venue: Cary Tennis Park
- Surface: Hard / outdoors
- Website: carytennisclassic.com
ATP Tour
- Category: ATP Challenger Tour (-2023, 2025-), Challenger Tour 100 (2024)
- Draw: 32S / 32Q / 16D
- Prize money: $133,250
WTA Tour
- Category: ITF Women's World Tennis Tour
- Draw: 32S / 32Q / 16D
- Prize money: $100,000

The Cary Tennis Classic (previously known as the Atlantic Tire Championships) is a professional tennis tournament played on outdoor hardcourts. It is currently a part of the ATP Challenger Tour and the ITF Women's World Tennis Tour, and has been held annually at the Cary Tennis Park in Cary, North Carolina, since 2015 for men and since 2024 for women.

== Past finals ==
=== Men's singles ===
| Year | Champion | Runner-up | Score |
|---|---|---|---|
| 2026 | (United States) Braden Shick | (France) Timo Legout | 4–6, 7–5, 6–3 |
| 2025 | (Japan) Rei Sakamoto | (Canada) Liam Draxl | 6–1, 6–4 |
| 2024 | Roman Safiullin | (Italy) Mattia Bellucci | 1–6, 7–5, 7–5 |
| 2023 (2) | (United States) Zachary Svajda | (Australia) Rinky Hijikata | 7–6^{(7–3)}, 4–6, 6–1 |
| 2023 (1) | (Australia) Adam Walton | (United States) Nicolas Moreno de Alboran | 6–4, 3–6, 7–5 |
| 2022 | (United States) Michael Mmoh | (Germany) Dominik Koepfer | 7–5, 6–3 |
| 2021 (2) | (United States) Mitchell Krueger | (United States) Bjorn Fratangelo | 6–4, 6–3 |
| 2021 (1) | (United States) Mitchell Krueger | (India) Ramkumar Ramanathan | 7–6^{(7–4)}, 6–2 |
| 2020 | (United States) Denis Kudla | (India) Prajnesh Gunneswaran | 3–6, 6–3, 6–0 |
| 2019 | (Italy) Andreas Seppi | (United States) Michael Mmoh | 6–2, 6–7^{(4–7)}, 6–3 |
| 2018 | (Australia) James Duckworth | (United States) Reilly Opelka | 7–6^{(7–4)}, 6–3 |
| 2017 | (United States) Kevin King | (United Kingdom) Cameron Norrie | 6–4, 6–1 |
| 2016 | (Republic of Ireland) James McGee | (United States) Ernesto Escobedo | 1–6, 6–1, 6–4 |
| 2015 | (United States) Dennis Novikov | (United States) Ryan Harrison | 6–4, 7–5 |

=== Men's doubles ===
| Year | Champions | Runners-up | Score |
|---|---|---|---|
| 2026 | (South Korea) Nam Ji-sung (Finland) Patrik Niklas-Salminen | (New Zealand) Finn Reynolds (New Zealand) James Watt | 5–7, 7–5, [10–8] |
| 2025 | (New Zealand) Finn Reynolds (New Zealand) James Watt | (Australia) Patrick Harper (United States) Trey Hilderbrand | 6–3, 6–7^{(2–7)}, [10–5] |
| 2024 | (Australia) John Peers (Australia) John-Patrick Smith | (Argentina) Federico Agustín Gómez (Greece) Petros Tsitsipas | walkover |
| 2023 (2) | (Australia) Andrew Harris (Australia) Rinky Hijikata | (United States) William Blumberg (Venezuela) Luis David Martínez | 6–4, 3–6, [10–6] |
| 2023 (1) | (United States) Evan King (United States) Reese Stalder | (Latvia) Miķelis Lībietis (Australia) Adam Walton | 6–3, 7–6^{(7–4)} |
| 2022 | (United States) Nathaniel Lammons (United States) Jackson Withrow | (Philippines) Treat Huey (Australia) John-Patrick Smith | 7–5, 2–6, [10–5] |
| 2021 (2) | (United States) William Blumberg (United States) Max Schnur | (United States) Stefan Kozlov (Canada) Peter Polansky | 6–4, 1–6, [10–4] |
| 2021 (1) | (United States) Christian Harrison (United States) Dennis Novikov | (Cyprus) Petros Chrysochos (Greece) Michail Pervolarakis | 6–3, 6–3 |
| 2020 | (Russia) Teymuraz Gabashvili (United States) Dennis Novikov | (United Kingdom) Luke Bambridge (United States) Nathaniel Lammons | 7–5, 4–6, [10–8] |
| 2019 | (United States) Sekou Bangoura (United States) Michael Mmoh | (Philippines) Treat Huey (Australia) John-Patrick Smith | 4–6, 6–4, [10–8] |
| 2018 | (United States) Evan King (United States) Hunter Reese | (France) Fabrice Martin (France) Hugo Nys | 6–4, 7–6^{(8–6)} |
| 2017 | (El Salvador) Marcelo Arévalo (Mexico) Miguel Ángel Reyes-Varela | (Latvia) Miķelis Lībietis (United States) Dennis Novikov | 6–7^{(6–8)}, 7–6^{(7–1)}, [10–6] |
| 2016 | (Canada) Philip Bester (Canada) Peter Polansky | (United States) Austin Krajicek (United States) Stefan Kozlov | 6–2, 6–2 |
| 2015 | (United States) Chase Buchanan (Slovenia) Blaž Rola | (United States) Austin Krajicek (United States) Nicholas Monroe | 6–4, 6–7^{(5–7)}, [10–4] |

=== Women's singles ===
| Year | Champion | Runner-up | Score |
|---|---|---|---|
| 2026 | (Italy) Lucrezia Stefanini | (United States) Savannah Broadus | 6–3, 6–2 |
| 2025 | (Czech Republic) Darja Viďmanová | (United States) Monika Ekstrand | 6–3, 6–1 |
| 2024 | (Spain) Nuria Párrizas Díaz | (Mexico) Renata Zarazúa | 6–3, 3–6, 7–6^{(7–2)} |

=== Women's doubles ===
| Year | Champions | Runners-up | Score |
|---|---|---|---|
| 2026 | (United States) Catherine Harrison (United States) Dalayna Hewitt | (Japan) Hiroko Kuwata (India) Ankita Raina | 6–4, 6–2 |
| 2025 | (United States) Ayana Akli (United States) Abigail Rencheli | (South Africa) Gabriella Broadfoot (United States) Maddy Zampardo | 6–3, 6–2 |
| 2024 | (Switzerland) Céline Naef (Slovenia) Tamara Zidanšek | (Georgia (country)) Oksana Kalashnikova; Iryna Shymanovich | 4–6, 6–3, [11–9] |
