= William Blumberg =

American tennis player (born 1998) in atlanta georgia

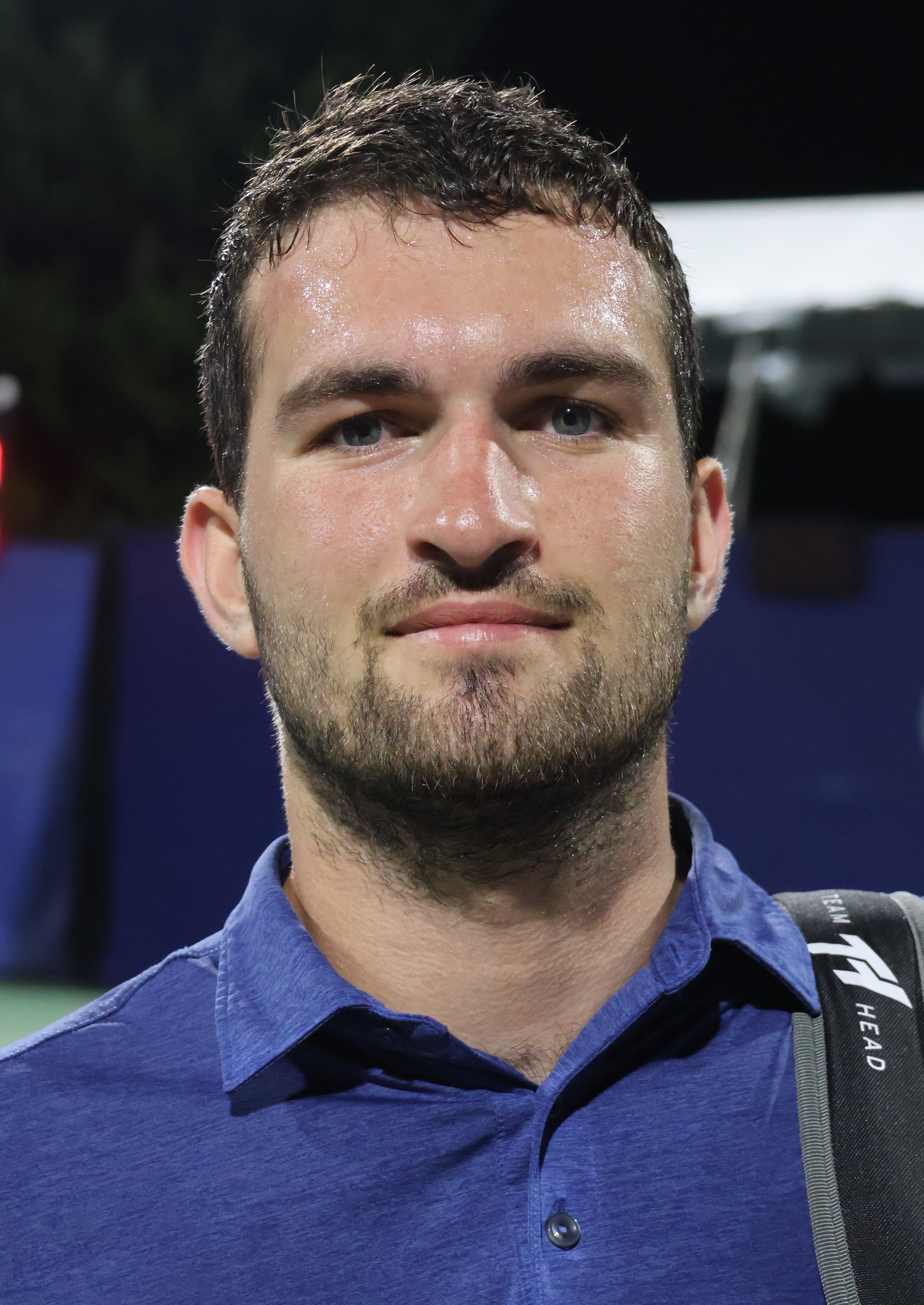
- Blumberg at the 2023 Cary Challenger II
- Country (sports): United States
- Residence: Greenwich, Connecticut, United States
- Born: January 26, 1998 (age 28) New York City, United States
- Height: 1.88 m (6 ft 2 in)
- Turned pro: 2021
- Retired: 2024
- Plays: Right-handed (two-handed backhand)
- College: North Carolina
- Coach: Mary Bryan Pope
- Prize money: US $298,101

Singles
- Career record: 0–1 (at ATP Tour level, Grand Slam level, and in Davis Cup)
- Career titles: 0
- Highest ranking: No. 438 (January 7, 2019)

Grand Slam singles results
- US Open: Q1 (2017)

Doubles
- Career record: 34–26 (at ATP Tour level, Grand Slam level, and in Davis Cup)
- Career titles: 3
- Highest ranking: No. 74 (September 12, 2022)

Grand Slam doubles results
- French Open: 1R (2023)
- Wimbledon: 2R (2022, 2023)
- US Open: 1R (2017, 2022, 2023, 2024)

Grand Slam mixed doubles results
- US Open: SF (2022)

William Blumberg (born January 26, 1998) is a former American professional tennis player. He has a career-high ATP doubles ranking of world No. 74 achieved on September 12, 2022 and a career-high singles ranking of No. 438 reached on February 18, 2019.

== Early life, Juniors and College ==
William's parents are Amy and David Blumberg. Blumberg identifies as Catholic, like his mother, while his father is Jewish. The family often has Jewish food during holidays.

Blumberg has two brothers. He attended Greenwich High School in Greenwich, Connecticut. As a senior at Greenwich, he went undefeated and did not lose a set all season. In 2016, he won the Class LL state invitational title, dropping only 3 games across the whole tournament.

During his junior career, he played at each of the four Grand Slam junior tournaments. He reached the final in the boys' doubles at the 2015 French Open partnering fellow American Tommy Paul.

Blumberg was the nation's top recruit for the class of 2016. After going 26–2 during his first season at North Carolina, Blumberg was named ACC Freshman of the Year, first-team all-ACC, and ITA Men's Tennis Rookie of the Year. He was also named the Most Outstanding Player at the 2017 NCAA tournament. In May 2021, he became the first 10-time All-America in ITA history, winning the honor in both singles and doubles in 2017, 2018, 2019, 2020 and 2021.

== Professional career ==
=== 2017–2019: Grand Slam doubles debut, Top 500 debut in singles ===
Blumberg made his Grand Slam main draw debut at the 2017 US Open after receiving a wildcard for the doubles main draw with compatriot Spencer Papa.

He reached a career-high of World No. 438 in singles on February 18, 2019.

=== 2021: Turned Pro, Maiden ATP title, Challenger tour success, Top 200 ===
He partnered as a wildcard pair with Jack Sock at the 2021 Hall of Fame Open in Newport, where he won his first ATP match. The unseeded pair reached the finals by defeating fellow Americans Tennys Sandgren and Denis Kudla, third seeds John-Patrick Smith and Harri Heliövaara, and second seeds Jonathan Erlich and Santiago González. In the final they defeated Austin Krajicek and Vasek Pospisil. With this run he entered the top 300 at World No. 284 on July 19, 2021, rising more than 1000 spots in the doubles rankings.

He made his debut in the top 200 on November 1, 2021, after winning his first and second Challengers in Cary in September and Las Vegas in October with Max Schnur. He followed that with a third Challenger win in Charlottesville in November also with Schnur.

=== 2022: Major debut & win, Two titles, Top 100, US Open Mixed doubles semifinal ===
In January, Blumberg won his fourth Challenger title in Cleveland with Schnur.

At the 2022 U.S. Men's Clay Court Championships, he reached the semifinals as a wildcard pair with Schnur where they lost to Ivan and Matej Sabanov.

At the 2022 Wimbledon Championships he made his debut at this Major partnering Casper Ruud. They defeated Miguel Ángel Reyes-Varela and Nicolás Barrientos in the first round in a five set match with a super tiebreak, his first win at a Major. They lost in the second round to Lloyd Glasspool and Harri Heliövaara.

At the 2022 Hall of Fame Open, he made his ATP main draw singles debut as a qualifier, losing in the first round to Benjamin Bonzi. At the same tournament as the defending champion in doubles, he reached the final partnering Steve Johnson. He would successfully defend his title with Johnson, defeating top seeds Raven Klaasen and Marcelo Melo in the final.

He reached the top 100 at World No. 85 on August 8, 2022, following his third title at the 2022 Los Cabos Open partnering Miomir Kecmanović, again defeating Klaasen and Melo in the final.

At the US Open he reached the mixed doubles semifinals with Caty McNally on his debut at this event for the first time at a Grand Slam defeating en route defending champions Desirae Krawczyk and Neal Skupski in the second round.

He finished the season ranked No. 100 in doubles on 21 November 2022.

=== 2023–2024: French Open debut, Sixth final, retirement ===
He made his debut at the 2023 French Open partnering Miomir Kecmanović. At the 2023 Wimbledon Championships he partnered again with Casper Ruud and reached the second round before withdrawing.

Blumberg reached his fifth final partnering with Rinky Hijikata at the 2024 Dallas Open defeating the wildcard pair of Ben Shelton and Emilio Nava before falling to the pair of Max Purcell and Jordan Thompson. Blumberg partnered with John Peers at the 2024 U.S. Men's Clay Court Championships in Houston where they defeated the wildcard pair of Shelton and Andrés Andrade in straight sets, en route to his sixth final. For the second consecutive Texas-based tournament, Blumberg and his partner lost the finals to the pair of Purcell and Thompson.

He retired after the US Open in September 2024.

== Personal info ==
Since January 2025 he started working as a client relationship analyst for Morgan Stanley in Atlanta Georgia.

== ATP career finals ==
=== Doubles: 6 (3 titles, 3 runner-ups) ===
Legend Grand Slam Tournaments (0–0) ATP Tour Finals (0–0) ATP Tour Masters 1000 (0–0) ATP Tour 500 Series (0–0) ATP Tour 250 Series (3–3)	Finals by surface Hard (1–1) Clay (0–1) Grass (2–1)	Finals by setting Outdoor (3–2) Indoor (0–1)

Result	W–L	Date	Tournament	Tier	Surface	Partner	Opponents	Score
Win	1–0	Jul 2021	Hall of Fame Open, United States	250 Series	Grass	(United States) Jack Sock	(United States) Austin Krajicek (Canada) Vasek Pospisil	6–2, 7–6^{(7–3)}
Win	2–0	Jul 2022	Hall of Fame Open, United States (2)	250 Series	Grass	(United States) Steve Johnson	(South Africa) Raven Klaasen (Brazil) Marcelo Melo	6–4, 7–5
Win	3–0	Aug 2022	Los Cabos Open, Mexico	250 Series	Hard	(Serbia) Miomir Kecmanović	(South Africa) Raven Klaasen (Brazil) Marcelo Melo	6–0, 6–1
Loss	3–1	Jul 2023	Hall of Fame Open, United States	250 Series	Grass	(Australia) Max Purcell	(United States) Nathaniel Lammons (United States) Jackson Withrow	3–6, 7–5, [5–10]
Loss	3–2	Feb 2024	Dallas Open, United States	250 Series	Hard (i)	(Australia) Rinky Hijikata	(Australia) Max Purcell (Australia) Jordan Thompson	4–6, 6–2, [8–10]
Loss	3–3	Apr 2024	U.S. Men's Clay Court Championships, United States	250 Series	Clay	(Australia) John Peers	(Australia) Max Purcell (Australia) Jordan Thompson	5–7, 1–6

== Junior Grand Slam finals ==
=== Doubles: 1 (1 runner-up) ===
Outcome	Year	Championship	Surface	Partner	Opponent	Score
Runner-up	2015	French Open	Clay	(United States) Tommy Paul	(Spain) Álvaro López San Martín (Spain) Jaume Munar	4–6, 2–6

== ATP Challenger and ITF Futures finals ==
=== Doubles: 12 (6–6) ===
Legend (doubles) ATP Challenger Tour (6–5) ITF Futures Tour (0–1)	Titles by surface Hard (4–3) Clay (2–3) Grass (0–0)

Result	W–L	Date	Tournament	Tier	Surface	Partner	Opponents	Score
Loss	0–1	Jan 2014	USA F2, Sunrise	Futures	Clay	(United States) Frances Tiafoe	(United States) Jason Jung (United States) Evan King	7–6^{(7–4)}, 4–6, [6–10]
Win	1–1	Sep 2021	Cary, USA	Challenger	Hard	(United States) Max Schnur	(United States) Stefan Kozlov (Canada) Peter Polansky	6–4, 1–6, [10–4]
Win	2–1	Oct 2021	Las Vegas, USA	Challenger	Hard	(United States) Max Schnur	(Chinese Taipei) Jason Jung (United States) Evan King	7–5, 6–7^{(5–7)}, [10–5]
Win	3–1	Nov 2021	Charlottesville, USA	Challenger	Hard (i)	(United States) Max Schnur	(Philippines) Treat Huey (Denmark) Frederik Nielsen	3–6, 6–1, [14–12]
Win	4–1	Jan 2022	Cleveland, USA	Challenger	Hard (i)	(United States) Max Schnur	(United States) Robert Galloway (United States) Jackson Withrow	6–3, 7–6^{(7–4)}
Loss	4–2	Apr 2023	Tallahassee, USA	Challenger	Clay	(Venezuela) Luis David Martínez	(Argentina) Federico Agustín Gómez (Argentina) Nicolás Kicker	6–7^{(2–7)}, 6–4, [11–13]
Win	5–2	Apr 2023	Savannah, USA	Challenger	Clay	(Venezuela) Luis David Martínez	(Argentina) Federico Agustín Gómez (Argentina) Nicolás Kicker	6–1, 6–4
Win	6–2	Jun 2023	Modena, Italy	Challenger	Clay	(Venezuela) Luis David Martínez	(Czech Republic) Roman Jebavý (Ukraine) Vladyslav Manafov	6–4, 6–4
Loss	6–3	Sep 2023	Cary, USA	Challenger	Hard	(Venezuela) Luis David Martínez	(Australia) Andrew Harris (Australia) Rinky Hijikata	4–6, 6–3, [6–10]
Loss	6–4	Oct 2023	Tiburon, USA	Challenger	Hard	(Venezuela) Luis David Martínez	(United Kingdom) Luke Johnson (Tunisia) Skander Mansouri	2–6, 3–6
Loss	6–5	Jan 2024	Cleveland, USA	Challenger	Hard (i)	(United States) Alex Lawson	(United States) George Goldhoff (Japan) James Trotter	7–6^{(7–0)}, 3–6, [8–10]
Loss	6–6	Apr 2024	Tallahassee, USA	Challenger	Clay	(Venezuela) Luis David Martínez	(Sweden) Simon Freund (Denmark) Johannes Ingildsen	5–7, 6–7^{(4–7)}

Sporting positions
Preceded by (Cyprus) Petros Chrysochos (Wake Forest)	ACC Freshman of the Year; 2017	Succeeded by (Canada) Benjamin Sigouin (North Carolina)
