= 2023 Atlanta Open – Singles =

Singles
- 2023 Atlanta Open

Final
- Champion: (United States) Taylor Fritz
- Runner-up: (Australia) Aleksandar Vukic
- Score: 7–5, 6–7^{(5–7)}, 6–4

Details
- Draw: 28
- Seeds: 8

Events
Singles	Doubles
← 2022 ·	Atlanta Open	· 2024 →

Taylor Fritz defeated Aleksandar Vukic in the final, 7–5, 6–7^{(5–7)}, 6–4 to win the singles tennis title at the 2023 Atlanta Open. It was his sixth ATP Tour singles title.

Alex de Minaur was the defending champion, but lost to Ugo Humbert in the quarterfinals.

== Seeds ==
The top four seeds received a bye into the second round.

1. (United States) Taylor Fritz (champion)
2. (Australia) Alex de Minaur (quarterfinals)
3. (United Kingdom) Dan Evans (second round)
4. (Japan) Yoshihito Nishioka (second round)
5. (United States) Christopher Eubanks (quarterfinals)
6. (United States) Ben Shelton (first round)
7. (France) Ugo Humbert (semifinals)
8. (United States) J. J. Wolf (semifinals)

== Draw ==
=== Key ===
- Q = Qualifier
- WC = Wild card
- LL = Lucky loser
- Alt = Alternate
- ITF = ITF entry
- PR = Protected ranking
- SR = Special ranking
- SE = Special exempt
- JE = Junior exempt
- JR = Junior Accelerator Programme entrant
- CO = College Accelerator Programme entrant
- NG = Next Gen Accelerator Program entrant
- w/o = Walkover
- r = Retired
- d = Defaulted

=== Finals ===
Semifinals
1	(United States) Taylor Fritz	6	7
8	(United States) J. J. Wolf	3	5
(Australia) Aleksandar Vukic	3	7^{7}	7
7	(France) Ugo Humbert	6	6^{2}	5

Final
1	(United States) Taylor Fritz	7	6^{5}	6
(Australia) Aleksandar Vukic	5	7^{7}	4

=== Top half ===
First round
(China) Y Wu	6	6
(France) C Moutet	3	4
(Australia) J Thompson	6^{5}	6^{5}
PR	(Japan) K Nishikori	7^{7}	7^{7}
Q	(China) J Shang	6	6
6	(United States) B Shelton	4	4
SE	(United States) J Isner	6	6^{4}	6^{3}
(Germany) D Koepfer	3	7^{7}	7^{7}
(United States) M Cressy	6	6
SE	(United States) A Michelsen	3	3
Q	(Chinese Taipei) J Jung	2	1
8	(United States) JJ Wolf	6	6

Second round
1	(United States) T Fritz	6	7^{7}
(China) Y Wu	4	6^{5}
PR	(Japan) K Nishikori	6	7^{7}
Q	(China) J Shang	4	6^{3}
3	(United Kingdom) D Evans	6	6^{3}	4
(Germany) D Koepfer	2	7^{7}	6
(United States) M Cressy	6^{7}	3
8	(United States) JJ Wolf	7^{9}	6

Quarterfinals
1	(United States) T Fritz	6	6
PR	(Japan) K Nishikori	4	2
(Germany) D Koepfer	2	3
8	(United States) JJ Wolf	6	6

Semifinals
1	(United States) T Fritz	6	7
8	(United States) JJ Wolf	3	5

=== Bottom half ===
First round
5	(United States) C Eubanks	6	6
WC	(United States) A Martin	2	4
(United States) B Nakashima	6	7^{7}
(Australia) M Purcell	3	6^{5}
WC	(United States) E Quinn	6^{5}	3
(Australia) A Vukic	7^{7}	6
7	(France) U Humbert	4	7	7
(France) C Lestienne	6	5	5
Q	(South Africa) L Harris	3	6	6
Q	(Australia) J Duckworth	6	3	2
WC	(France) G Monfils	6	3	6^{5}
(Australia) T Kokkinakis	1	6	7^{7}

Second round
5	(United States) C Eubanks	6^{4}	6	7
(United States) B Nakashima	7^{7}	4	5
(Australia) A Vukic	4	7	7^{7}
4	(Japan) Y Nishioka	6	5	6^{3}
7	(France) U Humbert	7^{8}	6
Q	(South Africa) L Harris	6^{6}	4
(Australia) T Kokkinakis	3	4
2	(Australia) A de Minaur	6	6

Quarterfinals
5	(United States) C Eubanks	4	4
(Australia) A Vukic	6	6
7	(France) U Humbert	7^{7}	6
2	(Australia) A de Minaur	6^{4}	3

Semifinals
(Australia) A Vukic	3	7^{7}	7
7	(France) U Humbert	6	6^{2}	5

== Qualifying ==
=== Seeds ===
1. (United States) Michael Mmoh (qualifying competition)
2. (Australia) James Duckworth (qualified)
3. (Canada) Gabriel Diallo (qualifying competition)
4. (France) Arthur Cazaux (qualifying competition)
5. (Netherlands) Gijs Brouwer (qualifying competition)
6. (China) Shang Juncheng (qualified)
7. (Japan) Shintaro Mochizuki (first round)
8. (South Africa) Lloyd Harris (qualified)

=== Qualifiers ===
1. (South Africa) Lloyd Harris
2. (Australia) James Duckworth
3. (Chinese Taipei) Jason Jung
4. (China) Shang Juncheng

=== Qualifying draw ===
==== First qualifier ====
First round
1	(United States) Michael Mmoh	4	7^{10}	6
(United States) Tennys Sandgren	6	6^{8}	4
WC	(United States) Donald Young	1	2
8	(South Africa) Lloyd Harris	6	6

Qualifying competition
1	(United States) Michael Mmoh	2	7^{7}	6^{2}
8	(South Africa) Lloyd Harris	6	6^{5}	7^{7}

==== Second qualifier ====
First round
2	(Australia) James Duckworth	4	7^{12}	6
(United States) Mitchell Krueger	6	6^{10}	3
Alt	(United States) Kevin King	3	4
5	(Netherlands) Gijs Brouwer	6	6

Qualifying competition
2	(Australia) James Duckworth	6	6
5	(Netherlands) Gijs Brouwer	2	4

==== Third qualifier ====
First round
3	(Canada) Gabriel Diallo	6	6
PR	(United States) Bradley Klahn	3	2
(Chinese Taipei) Jason Jung	7^{7}	6
7	(Japan) Shintaro Mochizuki	6^{3}	4

Qualifying competition
3	(Canada) Gabriel Diallo	6	5	6^{1}
(Chinese Taipei) Jason Jung	4	7	7^{7}

==== Fourth qualifier ====
First round
4	(France) Arthur Cazaux	6	6
WC	(United States) Keshav Chopra	0	3
(Japan) Yasutaka Uchiyama	6^{4}	5
6	(China) Shang Juncheng	7^{7}	7

Qualifying competition
4	(France) Arthur Cazaux	4	7^{7}	1
6	(China) Shang Juncheng	6	6^{2}	6
