= 2023 Abierto Mexicano Telcel – Singles =

Singles
- 2023 Abierto Mexicano Telcel

Final
- Champion: (Australia) Alex de Minaur
- Runner-up: (United States) Tommy Paul
- Score: 3–6, 6–4, 6–1

Details
- Draw: 32 (4 Q / 3 WC )
- Seeds: 8

Events
Singles	Doubles
- Mexican Open

Alex de Minaur defeated Tommy Paul in the final, 3–6, 6–4, 6–1 to win the singles tennis title at the 2023 Mexican Open. It was his seventh ATP Tour title, and first at the ATP 500 level.

Rafael Nadal was the reigning champion, but chose not to participate this year.

== Seeds ==
1. (Spain) Carlos Alcaraz (withdrew)
2. (Norway) Casper Ruud (second round)
3. (United States) Taylor Fritz (semifinals)
4. (Denmark) Holger Rune (semifinals)
5. (United Kingdom) Cameron Norrie (withdrew)
6. (United States) Frances Tiafoe (quarterfinals)
7. (United States) Tommy Paul (final)
8. (Australia) Alex de Minaur (champion)

== Draw ==
Key

- Q = Qualifier
- WC = Wild card
- LL = Lucky loser
- Alt = Alternate
- ITF = ITF entry
- PR = Protected ranking
- SR = Special ranking
- SE = Special exempt
- JE = Junior exempt
- JR = Junior Accelerator Programme entrant
- CO = College Accelerator Programme entrant
- NG = Next Gen Accelerator Program entrant
- w/o = Walkover
- r = Retired
- d = Defaulted

=== Finals ===
Semifinals
7	(United States) Tommy Paul	6	6^{2}	7^{7}
3	(United States) Taylor Fritz	3	7^{7}	6^{2}
4	(Denmark) Holger Rune	6	5	2
8	(Australia) Alex de Minaur	3	7	6

Final
7	(United States) Tommy Paul	6	4	1
8	(Australia) Alex de Minaur	3	6	6

=== Top half ===
First round
LL	(Italy) L Darderi	4	2
(United States) M McDonald	6	6
(Germany) D Altmaier	3	6	1
(United States) B Nakashima	6	3	6
(United States) M Giron	6^{3}	1
(United States) M Mmoh	7^{7}	6
(Ecuador) E Gómez	1	6^{4}
7	(United States) T Paul	6	7^{7}
3	(United States) T Fritz	3	6	6
(United States) J Isner	6	3	4
(Canada) D Shapovalov	6^{4}	6	7
(Serbia) M Kecmanović	7^{7}	0	5
(United States) C Eubanks	6^{3}	4
WC	(Spain) F López	7^{7}	6
(Japan) Y Nishioka	6^{6}	4
6	(United States) F Tiafoe	7^{8}	6

Second round
(United States) M McDonald	6	6
(United States) B Nakashima	2	0
(United States) M Mmoh	4	2^{r}
7	(United States) T Paul	6	2
3	(United States) T Fritz	6	6
(Canada) D Shapovalov	4	4
WC	(Spain) F López	2	6^{6}
6	(United States) F Tiafoe	6	7^{8}

Quarterfinals
(United States) M McDonald	2	2
7	(United States) T Paul	6	6
3	(United States) T Fritz	6	6
6	(United States) F Tiafoe	3	4

Semifinals
7	(United States) T Paul	6	6^{2}	7^{7}
3	(United States) T Fritz	3	7^{7}	6^{2}

=== Bottom half ===
First round
LL	(Sweden) E Ymer	5	6	6
(France) A Mannarino	7	3	4
(Italy) M Berrettini	6	1
(Slovakia) A Molčan	0	0^{r}
(Portugal) N Borges	6	7^{7}
Q	(United States) N Chappell	3	6^{3}
WC	(United States) B Shelton	7^{9}	4	2
4	(Denmark) H Rune	6^{7}	6	6
8	(Australia) A de Minaur	6	6
WC	(Mexico) R Pacheco Méndez	1	2
Q	(Italy) J Berrettini	3	7^{7}	2
(Germany) O Otte	6	6^{3}	1^{r}
Q	(Japan) T Daniel	6	6
(United States) JJ Wolf	4	4
Q	(Argentina) G Andreozzi	4	6	6^{2}
2	(Norway) C Ruud	6	4	7^{7}

Second round
LL	(Sweden) E Ymer	3	3
(Italy) M Berrettini	6	6
(Portugal) N Borges	0	2
4	(Denmark) H Rune	6	6
8	(Australia) A de Minaur	6	6
Q	(Italy) J Berrettini	1	0
Q	(Japan) T Daniel	7	2	7^{7}
2	(Norway) C Ruud	5	6	6^{5}

Quarterfinals
(Italy) M Berrettini	0	0^{r}
4	(Denmark) H Rune	6	1
8	(Australia) A de Minaur	6	6
Q	(Japan) T Daniel	2	2

Semifinals
4	(Denmark) H Rune	6	5	2
8	(Australia) A de Minaur	3	7	6

== Qualifying ==
=== Seeds ===
1. (Japan) Taro Daniel (qualified)
2. (United States) Steve Johnson (first round)
3. (France) Geoffrey Blancaneaux (first round)
4. (Sweden) Elias Ymer (qualifying competition, lucky loser)
5. (Italy) Luciano Darderi (qualifying competition, lucky loser)
6. (United States) Brandon Holt (qualifying competition)
7. (Argentina) Facundo Mena (first round)
8. (Argentina) Gonzalo Villanueva (first round)

=== Qualifiers ===
1. (Japan) Taro Daniel
2. (United States) Nick Chappell
3. (Italy) Jacopo Berrettini
4. (Argentina) Guido Andreozzi

=== Lucky losers ===
1. (Sweden) Elias Ymer
2. (Italy) Luciano Darderi

=== Qualifying draw ===
==== First qualifier ====
First round
1	(Japan) Taro Daniel	6	6
WC	(Mexico) Alex Hernández	2	1
WC	(Mexico) Ernesto Escobedo	4	7^{7}	2
6	(United States) Brandon Holt	6	6^{5}	6

Qualifying competition
1	(Japan) Taro Daniel	4	6	6
6	(United States) Brandon Holt	6	4	0

==== Second qualifier ====
First round
2	(United States) Steve Johnson	6	1	2
Alt	(United States) Nick Chappell	4	6	6
Alt	(New Zealand) Rubin Statham	6	6
8	(Argentina) Gonzalo Villanueva	3	2

Qualifying competition
Alt	(United States) Nick Chappell	6	6
Alt	(New Zealand) Rubin Statham	4	0

==== Third qualifier ====
First round
3	(France) Geoffrey Blancaneaux	6	4	4
WC	(Italy) Jacopo Berrettini	0	6	6
PR	(Japan) Yūichi Sugita	5	0
5	(Italy) Luciano Darderi	7	6

Qualifying competition
WC	(Italy) Jacopo Berrettini	6	6
5	(Italy) Luciano Darderi	2	4

==== Fourth qualifier ====
First round
4	(Sweden) Elias Ymer	6	6
PR	(United States) Bradley Klahn	4	4
Alt	(Argentina) Guido Andreozzi	7	6
7	(Argentina) Facundo Mena	5	2

Qualifying competition
4	(Sweden) Elias Ymer	6^{11}	3
Alt	(Argentina) Guido Andreozzi	7^{13}	6
