= 2024 Atlanta Open – Doubles =

Doubles
- 2024 Atlanta Open

Final
- Champions: (United States) Nathaniel Lammons (United States) Jackson Withrow
- Runners-up: (Sweden) André Göransson (Netherlands) Sem Verbeek
- Score: 4–6, 6–4, [12–10]

Events
Singles	Doubles
← 2023 ·	Atlanta Open

Nathaniel Lammons and Jackson Withrow successfully defended their title, defeating André Göransson and Sem Verbeek in the final; 4–6, 6–4, [12–10].

== Seeds ==
1. (Australia) Max Purcell / (Australia) Jordan Thompson (quarterfinals, withdrew)
2. (United States) Nathaniel Lammons / (United States) Jackson Withrow (champions)
3. (United Kingdom) Julian Cash / (United States) Robert Galloway (semifinals)
4. (Ecuador) Diego Hidalgo / (Australia) John-Patrick Smith (first round)

== Draw ==
=== Key ===
- Q = Qualifier
- WC = Wild card
- LL = Lucky loser
- Alt = Alternate
- ITF = ITF entry
- PR = Protected ranking
- SR = Special ranking
- SE = Special exempt
- JE = Junior exempt
- JR = Junior Accelerator Programme entrant
- CO = College Accelerator Programme entrant
- NG = Next Gen Accelerator Program entrant
- w/o = Walkover
- r = Retired
- d = Defaulted

=== Draw ===
First round
1	(Australia) M Purcell (Australia) J Thompson	4	6	[11]
WC	(United States) Bra Nakashima (United States) Bry Nakashima	6	2	[9]
(Sweden) A Göransson (Netherlands) S Verbeek	6	7
WC	(United States) K Chopra (United States) A Martin	4	5
3	(United Kingdom) J Cash (United States) R Galloway	6	5	[11]
PR	(United States) C Harrison (France) F Martin	3	7	[9]
(United States) R Seggerman (United States) P Trhac	3	6^{3}
Alt	(Mexico) H Hach Verdugo (France) A Mannarino	6	7^{7}
PR	(United States) W Blumberg (New Zealand) M Daniell	3	7	[10]
(United States) V Kirkov (France) A Rinderknech	6	5	[4]
Alt	(Australia) T Schoolkate (Australia) A Walton	7^{7}	7^{7}
4	(Ecuador) D Hidalgo (Australia) J-P Smith	6^{4}	6^{3}
A Karatsev (United States) M McDonald	6^{5}	4
(United States) E King (United States) R Stalder	7^{7}	6
Alt	(India) RC Bollipalli (India) N Kaliyanda Poonacha	6^{5}	4
2	(United States) N Lammons (United States) J Withrow	7^{7}	6

Quarterfinals
1	(Australia) M Purcell (Australia) J Thompson
(Sweden) A Göransson (Netherlands) S Verbeek	w/o
3	(United Kingdom) J Cash (United States) R Galloway	6	7^{7}
Alt	(Mexico) H Hach Verdugo (France) A Mannarino	2	6^{4}
PR	(United States) W Blumberg (New Zealand) M Daniell	w/o
Alt	(Australia) T Schoolkate (Australia) A Walton
(United States) E King (United States) R Stalder	4	7^{9}	[6]
2	(United States) N Lammons (United States) J Withrow	6	6^{7}	[10]

Semifinals
(Sweden) A Göransson (Netherlands) S Verbeek	6	6^{9}	[10]
3	(United Kingdom) J Cash (United States) R Galloway	4	7^{11}	[7]
PR	(United States) W Blumberg (New Zealand) M Daniell	6^{4}	4
2	(United States) N Lammons (United States) J Withrow	7^{7}	6

Final
(Sweden) A Göransson (Netherlands) S Verbeek	6	4	[10]
2	(United States) N Lammons (United States) J Withrow	4	6	[12]
