= 2023 Atlanta Open – Doubles =

Doubles
- 2023 Atlanta Open

Final
- Champions: (United States) Nathaniel Lammons (United States) Jackson Withrow
- Runners-up: (Australia) Max Purcell (Australia) Jordan Thompson
- Score: 7–6^{(7–3)}, 7–6^{(7–4)}

Events
Singles	Doubles
← 2022 ·	Atlanta Open	· 2024 →

Nathaniel Lammons and Jackson Withrow defeated Max Purcell and Jordan Thompson in the final, 7–6^{(7–3)}, 7–6^{(7–4)} to win the doubles tennis title at the 2023 Atlanta Open.

Thanasi Kokkinakis and Nick Kyrgios were the reigning champions, but Kyrgios chose not to participate this year. Kokkinakis was scheduled to partner Lloyd Harris, but withdrew before their first round match.

== Seeds ==
1. (United Kingdom) Jamie Murray / (New Zealand) Michael Venus (first round)
2. (France) Nicolas Mahut / (France) Édouard Roger-Vasselin (first round)
3. (Brazil) Marcelo Melo / (Australia) John Peers (semifinals)
4. (United States) Nathaniel Lammons / (United States) Jackson Withrow (champions)

== Draw ==
=== Key ===
- Q = Qualifier
- WC = Wild card
- LL = Lucky loser
- Alt = Alternate
- SE = Special exempt
- PR = Protected ranking
- ITF = ITF entry
- JE = Junior exempt
- w/o = Walkover
- r = Retired
- d = Defaulted
- SR = Special ranking

=== Draw ===
First round
1	(United Kingdom) J Murray (New Zealand) M Venus	4	2
(Australia) M Purcell (Australia) J Thompson	6	6
Alt	(Australia) A Harris (Australia) A Vukic	4	5
WC	(United States) T Bryde (United States) E Quinn	6	7
3	(Brazil) M Melo (Australia) J Peers	6	7^{7}
(Venezuela) LD Martínez (United States) R Stalder	1	6^{3}
(United Kingdom) D Evans (Australia) J-P Smith	2	6	[4]
(United States) W Blumberg (United States) R Ram	6	1	[10]
(India) Y Bhambri (India) S Myneni	6	6
WC	(United States) K King (United States) A Martin	3	4
(Japan) B McLachlan (United States) B Shelton	7^{7}	5	[7]
4	(United States) N Lammons (United States) J Withrow	6^{5}	7	[10]
(Sweden) A Göransson (Mexico) MÁ Reyes-Varela	7^{7}	6^{2}	[8]
(United States) E King (France) C Lestienne	6^{3}	7^{7}	[10]
(United Kingdom) J Cash (United States) R Galloway	7^{9}	7^{12}
2	(France) N Mahut (France) É Roger-Vasselin	6^{7}	6^{10}

Quarterfinals
(Australia) M Purcell (Australia) J Thompson	6	6^{2}	[10]
WC	(United States) T Bryde (United States) E Quinn	4	7^{7}	[2]
3	(Brazil) M Melo (Australia) J Peers	6	3	[13]
(United States) W Blumberg (United States) R Ram	3	6	[11]
(India) Y Bhambri (India) S Myneni	6	3	[8]
4	(United States) N Lammons (United States) J Withrow	3	6	[10]
(United States) E King (France) C Lestienne	5	6	[7]
(United Kingdom) J Cash (United States) R Galloway	7	3	[10]

Semifinals
(Australia) M Purcell (Australia) J Thompson	7^{7}	6
3	(Brazil) M Melo (Australia) J Peers	6^{4}	3
4	(United States) N Lammons (United States) J Withrow	7^{10}	6
(United Kingdom) J Cash (United States) R Galloway	6^{8}	4

Final
(Australia) M Purcell (Australia) J Thompson	6^{3}	6^{4}
4	(United States) N Lammons (United States) J Withrow	7^{7}	7^{7}
