= 2023 Atlanta Open =

- Date: July 24–30
- Edition: 35th
- Prize money: $737,170
- Surface: Hard, Sport Master
- Location: Atlanta, United States
- Venue: Atlantic Station

Champions

Singles
- (United States) Taylor Fritz

Doubles
- (United States) Nathaniel Lammons / (United States) Jackson Withrow
- Atlanta Open

The 2023 Atlanta Open was a professional tennis tournament played on hard courts. It was the 35th edition of the tournament, and was part of the 2023 ATP Tour. It took place at Atlantic Station in Atlanta, United States between July 24 and 30, 2023.

== Champions ==
=== Singles ===
- (United States) Taylor Fritz def. (Australia) Aleksandar Vukic, 7–5, 6–7^{(5–7)}, 6–4

=== Doubles ===
- (United States) Nathaniel Lammons / (United States) Jackson Withrow def. (Australia) Max Purcell / (Australia) Jordan Thompson, 7–6^{(7–3)}, 7–6^{(7–4)}

== Points and prize money ==
=== Point distribution ===
Event	W	F	SF	QF	Round of 16	Round of 32	Q	Q2	Q1
Singles	250	150	90	45	20	0	12	6	0
Doubles	250	150	90	45	0	—N/a	—N/a	—N/a	—N/a

=== Prize money ===
Event	W	F	SF	QF	Round of 16	Round of 32	Q2	Q1
Singles	$112,125	$65,405	$38,450	$22,280	$12,940	$7,905	$3,955	$2,155
Doubles*	$38,960	$20,850	$12,230	$6,830	$4,020	—N/a	—N/a	—N/a

_{*per team}

== Singles main-draw entrants ==
=== Seeds ===
Country	Player	Rank^{1}	Seed
USA	Taylor Fritz	9	1
AUS	Alex de Minaur	18	2
GBR	Dan Evans	29	3
JPN	Yoshihito Nishioka	30	4
USA	Christopher Eubanks	31	5
USA	Ben Shelton	39	6
FRA	Ugo Humbert	40	7
USA	J. J. Wolf	47	8

- ^{1} Rankings are as of 17 July 2023.

=== Other entrants ===
The following players received wildcards into the main draw:

- (United States) Andres Martin
- (France) Gaël Monfils
- (United States) Ethan Quinn

The following player received entry using a protected ranking:

- (Japan) Kei Nishikori

The following players received entry as special exempts:

- (United States) John Isner
- (United States) Alex Michelsen

The following players received entry from the qualifying draw:

- (Australia) James Duckworth
- (South Africa) Lloyd Harris
- (Chinese Taipei) Jason Jung
- (China) Shang Juncheng

=== Withdrawals ===
- (Portugal) Nuno Borges → replaced by (United States) Christopher Eubanks
- (Kazakhstan) Alexander Bublik → replaced by (France) Corentin Moutet
- (United States) Marcos Giron → replaced by (Australia) Thanasi Kokkinakis
- (France) Adrian Mannarino → replaced by (Australia) Aleksandar Vukic
- (United States) Mackenzie McDonald → replaced by (Germany) Dominik Koepfer

== Doubles main-draw entrants ==
=== Seeds ===
Country	Player	Country	Player	Rank^{1}	Seed
GBR	Jamie Murray	NZL	Michael Venus	50	1
FRA	Nicolas Mahut	FRA	Édouard Roger-Vasselin	54	2
BRA	Marcelo Melo	AUS	John Peers	65	3
USA	Nathaniel Lammons	USA	Jackson Withrow	69	4

- ^{1} Rankings are as of 17 July 2023.

=== Other entrants ===
The following pairs received wildcards into the doubles main draw:

- (United States) Trent Bryde / (United States) Ethan Quinn
- (United States) Kevin King / (United States) Andres Martin

The following pair received entry as alternates:

- (Australia) Andrew Harris / (Australia) Aleksandar Vukic

=== Withdrawals ===
- (El Salvador) Marcelo Arévalo / (Netherlands) Jean-Julien Rojer → replaced by (United States) Evan King / (France) Constant Lestienne
- (Australia) Matthew Ebden / (Australia) John-Patrick Smith → replaced by (United Kingdom) Dan Evans / (Australia) John-Patrick Smith
- (South Africa) Lloyd Harris / (Australia) Thanasi Kokkinakis → replaced by (Australia) Andrew Harris / (Australia) Aleksandar Vukic
