= 2024 Atlanta Open =

- Date: July 22–28
- Edition: 36th
- Category: ATP Tour 250
- Prize money: $756,020
- Surface: Hard, Sport Master
- Location: Atlanta, United States
- Venue: Atlantic Station

Champions

Singles
- (Japan) Yoshihito Nishioka

Doubles
- (United States) Nathaniel Lammons / (United States) Jackson Withrow
- Atlanta Open

The 2024 Atlanta Open was a professional tennis tournament played on hard courts. It was the 36th edition of the tournament, sorted as an ATP 250 tournament on the 2024 ATP Tour. It took place at Atlantic Station in Atlanta, United States between July 22 and 28, 2024.

== Champions ==
=== Singles ===
- (Japan) Yoshihito Nishioka def. (Australia) Jordan Thompson, 4–6, 7–6^{(7–2)}, 6–2

=== Doubles ===
- (United States) Nathaniel Lammons / (United States) Jackson Withrow def. (Sweden) André Göransson / (Netherlands) Sem Verbeek, 4–6, 6–4, [12–10]

== Singles main-draw entrants ==
=== Seeds ===
Country	Player	Rank^{1}	Seed
USA	Ben Shelton	14	1
FRA	Adrian Mannarino	25	2
USA	Frances Tiafoe	30	3
AUS	Jordan Thompson	40	4
ESP	Alejandro Davidovich Fokina	41	5
SRB	Miomir Kecmanović	47	6
USA	Brandon Nakashima	53	7
AUS	Max Purcell	64	8

- ^{1} Rankings are as of 15 July 2024.

=== Other entrants ===
The following players received wildcards into the main draw:

- (Spain) Alejandro Davidovich Fokina
- (United States) Andres Martin
- (Canada) Denis Shapovalov

The following player received entry as a special exempt:

- (United States) Reilly Opelka

The undermentioned players received entry from the qualifying draw:

- (Italy) Mattia Bellucci
- (United Kingdom) Billy Harris
- (China) Shang Juncheng
- (United States) Zachary Svajda

The following player received entry as lucky losers:

- (France) Harold Mayot
- (Australia) Adam Walton
- (United States) J. J. Wolf

=== Withdrawals ===
- (Australia) James Duckworth → replaced by (France) Arthur Cazaux
- (South Africa) Lloyd Harris → replaced by (Australia) Adam Walton
- (Australia) Thanasi Kokkinakis → replaced by (France) Harold Mayot
- (France) Constant Lestienne → replaced by (United States) J. J. Wolf
- (France) Giovanni Mpetshi Perricard → replaced by (Australia) Max Purcell

== Doubles main-draw entrants ==
=== Seeds ===
State	Instrumentalist	Country	Player	Rank^{1}	Seed
AUS	Max Purcell	AUS	Jordan Thompson	42	1
USA	Nathaniel Lammons	USA	Jackson Withrow	56	2
GBR	Julian Cash	USA	Robert Galloway	75	3
ECU	Diego Hidalgo	AUS	John-Patrick Smith	126	4

- ^{1} Rankings are as of 15 July 2024.

=== Other entrants ===
The tailing pairs received wildcards into the doubles main draw:

- (United States) Keshav Chopra / (United States) Andres Martin
- (United States) Brandon Nakashima / (United States) Bryce Nakashima

The following pairs received entry as alternates:

- (India) Rithvik Choudary Bollipalli / (India) Niki Kaliyanda Poonacha
- (Mexico) Hans Hach Verdugo / (France) Adrian Mannarino
- (Australia) Tristan Schoolkate / (Australia) Adam Walton

=== Withdrawals ===
- (Finland) Harri Heliövaara / (United Kingdom) Henry Patten → replaced by (United States) Ryan Seggerman / (United States) Patrik Trhac
- (Australia) Thanasi Kokkinakis / (United States) Frances Tiafoe → replaced by (Australia) Tristan Schoolkate / (Australia) Adam Walton
- (France) Constant Lestienne / (China) Shang Juncheng → replaced by (India) Rithvik Choudary Bollipalli / (India) Niki Kaliyanda Poonacha
- (Brazil) Rafael Matos / (Brazil) Marcelo Melo → replaced by (Mexico) Hans Hach Verdugo / (France) Adrian Mannarino
