= Nathaniel Lammons =

American tennis player

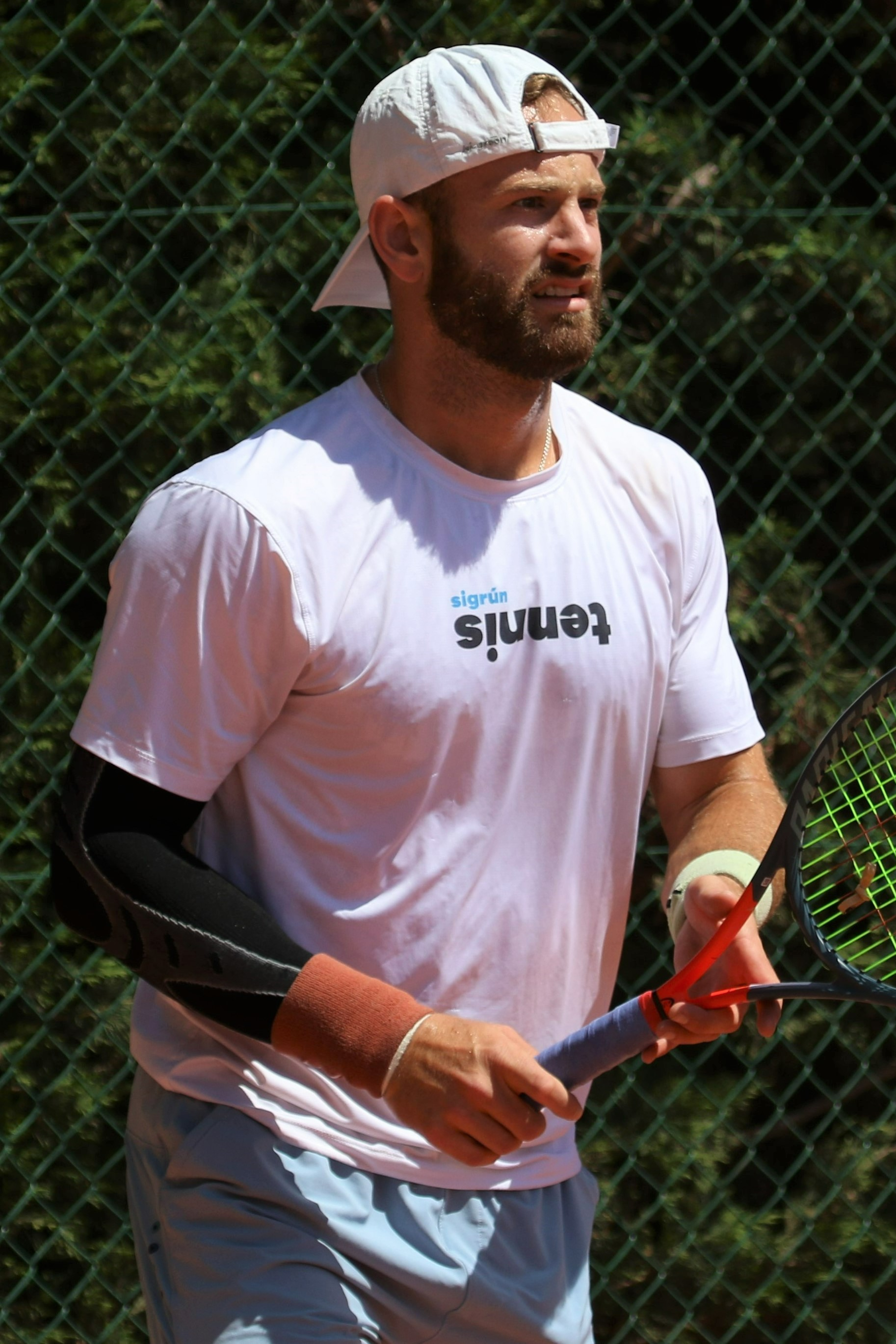
- Lammons at the 2022 BNP Paribas Primrose Bordeaux
- Country (sports): United States
- Residence: Dallas, United States
- Born: August 12, 1993 (age 33) Arlington, Texas, United States
- Height: 5 ft 11 in (1.80 m)
- Turned pro: 2016
- Plays: Right-handed (two-handed backhand)
- College: SMU
- Prize money: US $1,606,263

Singles
- Career record: 0–0
- Highest ranking: No. 591 (January 14, 2019)
- Current ranking: No. 1,724 (August 31, 2026)

Doubles
- Career record: 126–120
- Career titles: 10
- Highest ranking: No. 17 (January 27, 2025)
- Current ranking: No. 87 (August 31, 2026)

Grand Slam doubles results
- Australian Open: 3R (2024)
- French Open: 1R (2022, 2023, 2024, 2025)
- Wimbledon: QF (2023)
- US Open: SF (2024)

Grand Slam mixed doubles results
- Australian Open: QF (2024)
- French Open: SF (2023)
- Wimbledon: QF (2024)
- US Open: 1R (2021, 2023)
- Last updated on: September 3, 2026.

Nathaniel Lammons (born August 12, 1993) is an American professional tennis player who specializes in doubles. He has a career-high ATP ranking of world No. 17 in doubles achieved on January 27, 2025. He has won 10 ATP doubles titles.

A former player at Southern Methodist University, Lammons turned professional in 2016. Lammons sealed his top 100 doubles debut in July 2019, a year in which he won four doubles titles from seven doubles finals reached as he broke through on the ATP Challenger Tour. In 2022, he won his first two career ATP Tour doubles titles in San Diego and Seoul, earning him his top 50 debut. Together with partner Jackson Withrow in 2023, Lammons reached his first ATP 500 final in Acapulco and his first ATP Masters 1000 semifinal in Miami. In 2024, he made his first Grand Slam semifinal at the 2024 US Open with Withrow and reached the top 20.

== Professional career ==
=== 2021: Partnership with Withrow, win over World No. 1 team ===
At the 2021 US Open partnering Jackson Withrow they defeated top pair Nikola Mektić and Mate Pavić in the first round in 75 minutes.

=== 2022: First ATP titles, top 50 ===
He reached his maiden final at the 2022 Chile Open with André Göransson.

At the 2022 San Diego Open he won his first ATP title with Withrow defeating Jason Kubler and Luke Saville. The pair moved up 25 places to 35th in the doubles race. He made his top 60 debut in the rankings at world No. 55 on 26 September 2022. At the Korea Open he partnered Raven Klaasen to win his second title in two weeks defeating Nicolás Barrientos and Miguel Ángel Reyes-Varela in straight sets. He moved another 7 positions up to reach the top 50 in the doubles rankings at world No. 48 on 3 October 2022.

The pair Lammons/Withrow ended the season at No. 32 in the ATP doubles rankings.

=== 2023–24: Eight titles, Major & Masters semifinals, top 20 ===
In the beginning of 2023, Lammons reached three finals in Auckland, in Dallas and at the ATP 500 Mexican Open in Acapulco. The pair Lammons/Withrow won the title at the 2023 Arizona Tennis Classic. At the 2023 Miami Open they reached the semifinals of a Masters for the first time but lost to eventual champions Santiago González and Édouard Roger-Vasselin. He made his debut in the top 30 on 8 May 2023.

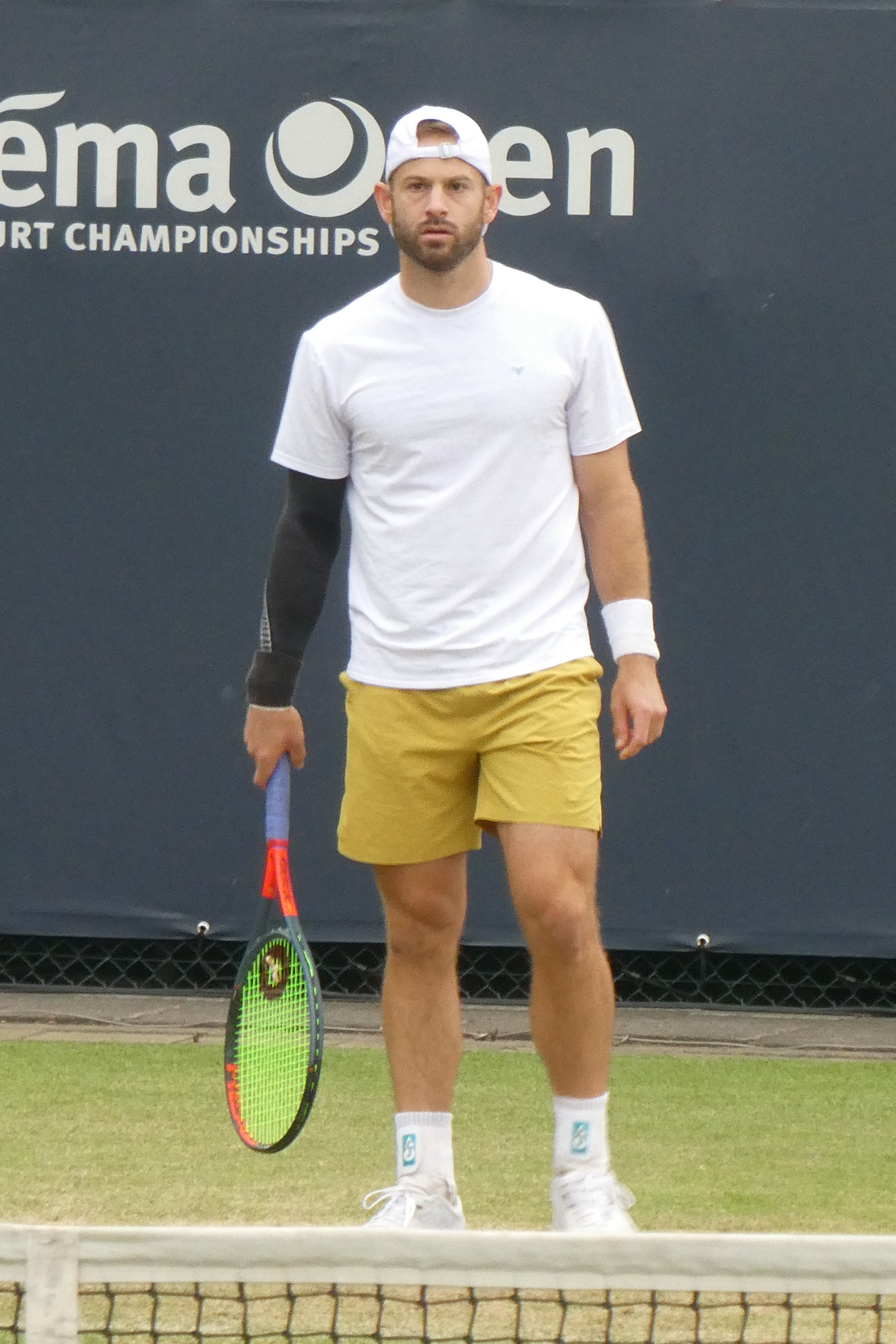
Lammons at the 2024 Libéma Open

During the American summer swing, in the span of two months Lammons and Withrow won three titles at the 2023 Atlanta Open, the 2023 Hall of Fame Open and the 2023 Winston-Salem Open. The pair reached their eight final of the season and second at the ATP 500 level at the 2023 Erste Bank Open in Vienna. At the last Masters of the season in Paris the pair reached the quarterfinals defeating sixth seeds Máximo González and Andrés Molteni.

Lammons and Withrow won their sixth title as a pair at the 2024 Libéma Open defeating top seeds Wesley Koolhof and Nikola Mektić. They successfully defended their Atlanta Open title in its last edition making them the last champions at the tournament. The pair captured their first ATP 500 title at the 2024 Mubadala Citi DC Open in Washington D.C. They also successfully defended their Winston-Salem title, making it the fourth for the season.

At the 2024 US Open, Lammons reached the semifinals of a Grand Slam for the first time in his career, partnering Withrow, with wins over three-time defending champions Joe Salisbury and Rajeev Ram and 13th seeds Wesley Koolhof and Nikola Mektić. They lost to eventual champions Max Purcell and Jordan Thompson in straight sets. As a result he reached the top 20 on 9 September 2024. At the 2024 Shanghai Masters, they reached the quarterfinals but lost to Wesley Koolhof and Nikola Mektić which halted their attempt to move one position up above their opponents in the ATP doubles race from their current place of No. 9.

== ATP Tour finals ==
=== Doubles: 17 (10 titles, 7 runner-ups) ===
Legend Grand Slam tournaments (0–0) ATP Tour Finals (0–0) ATP Tour Masters 1000 (0–0) ATP Tour 500 Series (1–2) ATP Tour 250 Series (9–5)	Finals by surface Hard (8–6) Clay (0–1) Grass (2–0)	Finals by setting Outdoors (9–4) Indoors (1–3)

Result	W–L	Date	Tournament	Tier	Surface	Partner	Opponents	Score
Loss	0–1	Feb 2022	Chile Open, Chile	250 Series	Clay	(Sweden) André Göransson	(Brazil) Felipe Meligeni Alves (Brazil) Rafael Matos	6–7^{(8–10)}, 6–7^{(3–7)}
Win	1–1	Sep 2022	San Diego Open, United States	250 Series	Hard	(United States) Jackson Withrow	(Australia) Jason Kubler (Australia) Luke Saville	7–6^{(7–5)}, 6–2
Win	2–1	Oct 2022	Korea Open, South Korea	250 Series	Hard	(South Africa) Raven Klaasen	(Colombia) Nicolás Barrientos (Mexico) Miguel Ángel Reyes-Varela	6–1, 7–5
Loss	2–2	Oct 2022	Gijón Open, Spain	250 Series	Hard (i)	(United States) Jackson Withrow	(Argentina) Máximo González (Argentina) Andrés Molteni	7–6^{(8–6)}, 6–7^{(4–7)}, [5–10]
Loss	2–3	Jan 2023	Auckland Open, New Zealand	250 Series	Hard	(United States) Jackson Withrow	(Croatia) Nikola Mektić (Croatia) Mate Pavić	4–6, 7–6^{(7–5)}, [6–10]
Loss	2–4	Feb 2023	Dallas Open, United States	250 Series	Hard (i)	(United States) Jackson Withrow	(United Kingdom) Jamie Murray (New Zealand) Michael Venus	6–1, 6–7^{(4–7)}, [7–10]
Loss	2–5	Mar 2023	Mexican Open, Mexico	500 Series	Hard	(United States) Jackson Withrow	(Austria) Alexander Erler (Austria) Lucas Miedler	6–7^{(9–11)}, 6–7^{(3–7)}
Win	3–5	Jul 2023	Hall of Fame Open, United States	250 Series	Grass	(United States) Jackson Withrow	(United States) William Blumberg (Australia) Max Purcell	6–3, 5–7, [10–5]
Win	4–5	Jul 2023	Atlanta Open, United States	250 Series	Hard	(United States) Jackson Withrow	(Australia) Max Purcell (Australia) Jordan Thompson	7–6^{(7–3)}, 7–6^{(7–4)}
Win	5–5	Aug 2023	Winston-Salem Open, United States	250 Series	Hard	(United States) Jackson Withrow	(United Kingdom) Lloyd Glasspool (United Kingdom) Neal Skupski	6–3, 6–4
Loss	5–6	Sep 2023	Zhuhai Championships, China	250 Series	Hard	(United States) Jackson Withrow	(United Kingdom) Jamie Murray (New Zealand) Michael Venus	4–6, 4–6
Win	6–6	Sep 2023	Astana Open, Kazakhstan	250 Series	Hard (i)	(United States) Jackson Withrow	(Croatia) Mate Pavić (Australia) John Peers	7–6^{(7–4)}, 7–6^{(9–7)}
Loss	6–7	Oct 2023	Vienna Open, Austria	500 Series	Hard (i)	(United States) Jackson Withrow	(United States) Rajeev Ram (United Kingdom) Joe Salisbury	4–6, 7–5, [10–12]
Win	7–7	Jun 2024	Libéma Open, Netherlands	250 Series	Grass	(United States) Jackson Withrow	(Netherlands) Wesley Koolhof (Croatia) Nikola Mektić	7–6^{(7–5)}, 7–6^{(7–3)}
Win	8–7	Jul 2024	Atlanta Open, United States (2)	250 Series	Hard	(United States) Jackson Withrow	(Sweden) André Göransson (Netherlands) Sem Verbeek	4–6, 6–4, [12–10]
Win	9–7	Aug 2024	Washington Open, United States	500 Series	Hard	(United States) Jackson Withrow	(Brazil) Rafael Matos (Brazil) Marcelo Melo	7–5, 6–3
Win	10–7	Aug 2024	Winston-Salem Open, United States (2)	250 Series	Hard	(United States) Jackson Withrow	(United Kingdom) Julian Cash (United States) Robert Galloway	6–4, 6–3

== Performance Timeline ==
=== Doubles ===
Tournament	2018	2019	2020	2021	2022	2023	2024	2025	SR	W–L	Win %
Grand Slam tournaments
Australian Open	A	A	A	A	2R	1R	3R	2R	0 / 4	3–4	43%
French Open	A	A	A	A	1R	1R	1R	1R	0 / 4	0–4	0%
Wimbledon	A	A	NH	1R	1R	QF	3R	1R	0 / 5	5–5	50%
US Open	2R	1R	1R	2R	2R	QF	SF	1R	0 / 8	10–8	59%
Win–loss	1–1	0–1	0–1	1–2	2–4	6–4	8–4	1–4	0 / 21	18–21	46%
ATP Tour Masters 1000
Indian Wells Open	A	A	NH	A	A	1R	QF	A	0 / 2	2–2	50%
Miami Open	A	A	NH	A	A	SF	2R	A	0 / 2	4–2	67%
Monte-Carlo Masters	A	A	NH	A	A	A	2R	A	0 / 1	1–1	50%
Madrid Open	A	A	NH	A	A	2R	QF	1R	0 / 3	3–3	50%
Italian Open	A	A	A	A	A	1R	1R	1R	0 / 3	0–3	0%
Canadian Open	A	A	NH	A	A	2R	1R	1R	0 / 3	1–3	25%
Cincinnati Open	A	A	A	A	A	1R	1R	1R	0 / 3	0–3	0%
Shanghai Masters	A	A	NH			1R	QF	A	0 / 2	2–2	50%
Paris Masters	A	A	A	A	A	QF	1R	A	0 / 2	2–2	50%
Win–loss	0–0	0–0	0–0	0–0	0–0	7–8	9–9	0–4	0 / 21	15–21	42%

== ATP Challenger and ITF Tour finals ==
=== Doubles: 53 (30–23) ===
Legend ATP Challenger Tour (21–13) ITF Futures Tour (9–10)	Finals by surface Hard (23–17) Clay (7–6) Grass (0–0) Carpet (0–0)

Result	W–L	Date	Tournament	Tier	Surface	Partner	Opponents	Score
Win	1–0	Jun 2016	USA F21, Tulsa	Futures	Hard	(United States) Dane Webb	(South Africa) Rikus de Villiers (United States) Clay Thompson	7–5, 4–6, [12–10]
Loss	1–1	Sep 2016	Israel F11, Herzliya	Futures	Hard	(United States) Dane Webb	(United States) Connor Smith (United States) Danny Thomas	3–6, 4–6
Loss	1–2	Sep 2016	Israel F12, Ashkelon	Futures	Hard	(United States) Dane Webb	(United States) Connor Smith (United States) Danny Thomas	0–6, 6–7^{(3–7)}
Loss	1–3	Sep 2016	Israel F13, Kiryat Gat	Futures	Hard	(United States) Dane Webb	(Israel) Dekel Bar (United Kingdom) Scott Clayton	4–6, 7–5, [5–10]
Win	2–3	Dec 2016	USA F40, Tallahassee	Futures	Hard (i)	(United States) Robert Galloway	(Tunisia) Aziz Dougaz (Burundi) Guy Orly Iradukunda	6–4, 5–7, [10–8]
Loss	2–4	May 2017	Mexico F2, Villahermosa	Futures	Hard (i)	(United Kingdom) Farris Fathi Gosea	(United States) Kevin King (South Africa) Nicolaas Scholtz	6–7^{(4–7)}, 6–7^{(4–7)}
Win	3–4	May 2017	Mexico F3, Córdoba	Futures	Hard	(United Kingdom) Farris Fathi Gosea	(United States) Hunter Callahan (Portugal) Bernardo Saraiva	6–4, 6–7^{(5–7)}, [10–8]
Win	4–4	Jun 2017	Zimbabwe F1, Harare	Futures	Hard	(Zimbabwe) Benjamin Lock	(Zimbabwe) Mark Fynn (South Africa) Nicolaas Scholtz	6–2, 6–3
Loss	4–5	Jun 2017	Zimbabwe F2, Harare	Futures	Hard	(Zimbabwe) Benjamin Lock	(Zimbabwe) Mark Fynn (South Africa) Nicolaas Scholtz	6–3, 1–6, [7–10]
Win	5–5	Jul 2017	Zimbabwe F3, Harare	Futures	Hard	(Zimbabwe) Benjamin Lock	(France) Baptiste Crepatte (France) Thomas Setodji	7–6^{(7–4)}, 6–2
Loss	5–6	Jul 2017	Egypt F19, Sharm El Sheikh	Futures	Hard	(Zimbabwe) Benjamin Lock	(Ukraine) Marat Deviatiarov (Czech Republic) Tomáš Papik	4–6, 6–1, [5–10]
Loss	5–7	Jul 2017	Egypt F20, Sharm El Sheikh	Futures	Hard	(Portugal) Bernardo Saraiva	(Italy) Julian Ocleppo (Italy) Andrea Vavassori	6–2, 3–6, [8–10]
Win	6–7	Aug 2017	USA F26, Decatur	Futures	Hard	(Moldova) Alexandru Gozun	(Australia) Edward Bourchier (Australia) Harry Bourchier	6–2, 7–6^{(7–2)}
Win	7–7	Sep 2017	France F20, Plaisir	Futures	Hard (i)	(United States) Alex Lawson	(France) Antoine Hoang (France) Grégoire Jacq	4–6, 7–6^{(9–7)}, [10–4]
Loss	7–8	Oct 2017	France F22, Nevers	Futures	Hard (i)	(United States) Alex Lawson	(France) Benjamin Bonzi (France) Antoine Hoang	6–7^{(5–7)}, 4–6
Loss	7–9	Oct 2017	France F23, Saint-Dizier	Futures	Hard (i)	(United States) Alex Lawson	(France) Jonathan Kanar (France) Mick Lescure	6–0, 4–6, [9–11]
Win	8–9	Oct 2017	France F24, Rodez	Futures	Hard (i)	(United States) Alex Lawson	(France) Antoine Hoang (France) Ugo Humbert	7–6^{(7–4)}, 4–6, [10–7]
Loss	8–10	Dec 2017	USA F39, Waco	Futures	Hard (i)	(United States) Alex Lawson	(Germany) Julian Lenz (Venezuela) Roberto Maytín	6–7^{(5–7)}, 6–1, [12–14]
Win	9–10	Dec 2017	USA F40, Tallahassee	Futures	Hard (i)	(United States) Alex Lawson	(United States) Jose E Gracia (France) Lucas Poullain	6–3, 6–0
Win	10–10	Jul 2018	Scheveningen, Netherlands	Challenger	Clay	(Philippines) Ruben Gonzales	(Venezuela) Luis David Martínez (Portugal) Gonçalo Oliveira	6–3, 6–7^{(8–10)}, [10–5]
Loss	10–11	Aug 2018	Sopot, Poland	Challenger	Clay	(Philippines) Ruben Gonzales	(Poland) Mateusz Kowalczyk (Poland) Szymon Walków	6–7^{(6–8)}, 3–6
Loss	10–12	Jan 2019	Columbus, USA	Challenger	Hard (i)	(United States) Robert Galloway	(United States) Maxime Cressy (Portugal) Bernardo Saraiva	5–7, 6–7^{(3–7)}
Win	11–12	Jan 2019	Newport Beach, USA	Challenger	Hard	(United States) Robert Galloway	(Monaco) Romain Arneodo (Belarus) Andrei Vasilevski	7–5, 7–6^{(7–1)}
Loss	11–13	Feb 2019	Cleveland, USA	Challenger	Hard	(United States) Robert Galloway	(Monaco) Romain Arneodo (Belarus) Andrei Vasilevski	4–6, 6–7^{(4–7)}
Win	12–13	Feb 2019	Cherbourg, France	Challenger	Hard (i)	(United States) Robert Galloway	(Italy) Raúl Brancaccio (Spain) Javier Barranco Cosano	4–6, 7–6^{(7–4)}, [10–8]
Win	13–13	Jul 2019	Ludwigshafen, Germany	Challenger	Clay	(Brazil) Fernando Romboli	(Portugal) Pedro Sousa (Portugal) João Domingues	7–6^{(7–4)}, 6–1
Loss	13–14	Jul 2019	Braunschweig, Germany	Challenger	Clay	(Croatia) Antonio Šančić	(Argentina) Guillermo Durán (Italy) Simone Bolelli	3–6, 2–6
Win	14–14	Sep 2019	New Haven, USA	Challenger	Hard	(United States) Robert Galloway	(Belgium) Sander Gillé (Belgium) Joran Vliegen	7–5, 6–4
Win	15–14	Feb 2020	Cleveland, USA	Challenger	Hard	(Philippines) Treat Huey	(Australia) Luke Saville (Australia) John-Patrick Smith	7–5, 6–2
Win	16–14	Mar 2020	Columbus, USA	Challenger	Hard	(Philippines) Treat Huey	(United Kingdom) Lloyd Glasspool (United States) Alex Lawson	7–6^{(7–3)}, 7–6^{(7–4)}
Loss	16–15	Sep 2020	Iași, Romania	Challenger	Clay	(Philippines) Treat Huey	(Brazil) Rafael Matos (Brazil) João Menezes	2–6, 2–6
Win	17-15	Oct 2020	Split, Croatia	Challenger	Clay	(Philippines) Treat Huey	(Sweden) André Göransson (United States) Hunter Reese	6–4, 7–6^{(7–3)}
Loss	17-16	Oct 2020	Istanbul, Turkey	Challenger	Hard	(United States) Robert Galloway	(Uruguay) Ariel Behar (Ecuador) Gonzalo Escobar	6–4, 3–6, [7–10]
Loss	17-17	Nov 2020	Cary, United States	Challenger	Hard	(United Kingdom) Luke Bambridge	(Russia) Teymuraz Gabashvili (United States) Dennis Novikov	5–7, 6–4, [8–10]
Win	18-17	Mar 2021	Nur-Sultan, Kazakhstan	Challenger	Hard (i)	(United States) Jackson Withrow	(United States) Nathan Pasha (United States) Max Schnur	6-4, 6-2
Win	19-17	May 2021	Biella, Italy	Challenger	Clay	(Sweden) André Göransson	(Brazil) Rafael Matos (Brazil) Felipe Meligeni Alves	7–6^{(7–3)}, 6–3
Win	20–17	May 2021	Heilbronn, Germany	Challenger	Clay	(United States) Jackson Withrow	(Sweden) André Göransson (Netherlands) Sem Verbeek	6–7^{(4–7)}, 6–4, [10–8]
Loss	20-18	Sep 2021	Szczecin, Poland	Challenger	Clay	(Sweden) André Göransson	(Mexico) Santiago González (Argentina) Andrés Molteni	6–2, 2–6, [13–15]
Win	21–18	Nov 2021	Champaign, USA	Challenger	Hard (i)	(United States) Jackson Withrow	(Philippines) Treat Huey (United States) Max Schnur	6–4, 3–6, [10–6]
Loss	21-19	Apr 2022	Sarasota, USA	Challenger	Clay	(Sweden) André Göransson	(United States) Robert Galloway (United States) Jackson Withrow	3–6, 6–7^{(3–7)}
Win	22–19	Apr 2022	Split, Croatia	Challenger	Clay	(France) Albano Olivetti	(France) Sadio Doumbia (France) Fabien Reboul	4–6, 7–6^{(8–6)}, [10–7]
Win	23–19	Jul 2022	Salzburg, Austria	Challenger	Clay	(United States) Jackson Withrow	(Austria) Alexander Erler (Austria) Lucas Miedler	7–5, 5–7, [11–9]
Win	24–19	Sep 2022	Cary, USA	Challenger	Hard	(United States) Jackson Withrow	(Philippines) Treat Huey (Australia) John-Patrick Smith	7–5, 2–6, [10–5]
Win	25–19	Mar 2023	Phoenix, USA	Challenger	Hard	(United States) Jackson Withrow	(Monaco) Hugo Nys (Poland) Jan Zieliński	6–7^{(1–7)}, 6–4, [10–8]
Loss	25-20	May 2023	Turin, Italy	Challenger	Clay (Note: The final itself was played on indoor hard due to rain.)	(Australia) John Peers	(Kazakhstan) Andrey Golubev (Ukraine) Denys Molchanov	6–7^{(4–7)}, 7–6^{(8–6)}, [5–10]
Win	26–20	Oct 2025	Shenzhen, China	Challenger	Hard	(Netherlands) Jean-Julien Rojer	(Australia) Finn Reynolds (Australia) James Watt	6–7^{(5–7)}, 7–5, [10–4]
Win	27–20	Oct 2025	Seoul, South Korea	Challenger	Hard	(Netherlands) Jean-Julien Rojer	(United States) George Goldhoff (United States) Theodore Winegar	6–3, 6–4
Win	28–20	Nov 2025	Taipei, Taiwan	Challenger	Hard	(Netherlands) Jean-Julien Rojer	(Japan) Kaito Uesugi (Japan) Seita Watanabe	7–6^{(7–4)}, 7–6^{(8–6)}
Loss	28–21	Mar 2026	Morelia, Mexico	Challenger	Hard	(United States) Jackson Withrow	(Ecuador) Diego Hidalgo (United States) Patrik Trhac	6–7^{(5–7)}, 6–7^{(4–7)}
Loss	28–22	May 2026	Chișinău, Moldova	Challenger	Hard	(United States) Jackson Withrow	(United States) George Goldhoff (United States) Theodore Winegar	1–6, 4–6
Win	29–22	Jul 2026	Lincoln, USA	Challenger	Hard	(United States) Jackson Withrow	(United States) George Goldhoff (Canada) Cleeve Harper	6–3, 6–3
Win	30–22	Jul 2026	Vancouver, Canada	Challenger	Hard	(United States) Jackson Withrow	(United States) Daniel Milavsky (United States) Braden Shick	7–6^{(9–7)}, 7–6^{(7–1)}
Loss	30–23	Sep 2026	Tiburon, USA	Challenger	Hard	(United States) Jackson Withrow	(Mexico) Hans Hach Verdugo (United States) JJ Tracy	6–7^{(7–9)}, 4–6
