= 2023 Abierto Mexicano Telcel – Doubles =

Doubles
- 2023 Abierto Mexicano Telcel

Final
- Champions: (Austria) Alexander Erler (Austria) Lucas Miedler
- Runners-up: (United States) Nathaniel Lammons (United States) Jackson Withrow
- Score: 7–6^{(11–9)}, 7–6^{(7–3)}

Events
Singles	Doubles
← 2022 ·	Abierto Mexicano Telcel	· 2024 →

Alexander Erler and Lucas Miedler defeated Nathaniel Lammons and Jackson Withrow in the final, 7–6^{(11–9)}, 7–6^{(7–3)} to win the doubles tennis title at the 2023 Mexican Open.

Feliciano López and Stefanos Tsitsipas were the reigning champions, but withdrew before the tournament due to Tsitsipas' shoulder injury.

Wesley Koolhof and Neal Skupski will regain the ATP number 1 doubles ranking from Rajeev Ram at the end of the tournament. Joe Salisbury was also in contention for the top ranking at the start of the tournament.

== Seeds ==
1. (Netherlands) Wesley Koolhof / (United Kingdom) Neal Skupski (semifinals)
2. (El Salvador) Marcelo Arévalo / (Netherlands) Jean-Julien Rojer (first round)
3. (United Kingdom) Jamie Murray / (New Zealand) Michael Venus (first round)
4. (Colombia) Juan Sebastián Cabal / (Colombia) Robert Farah (first round)

== Draw ==
=== Key ===
- Q = Qualifier
- WC = Wild card
- LL = Lucky loser
- Alt = Alternate
- SE = Special exempt
- PR = Protected ranking
- ITF = ITF entry
- JE = Junior exempt
- w/o = Walkover
- r = Retired
- d = Defaulted
- SR = Special ranking

=== Draw ===
First round
1	(Netherlands) W Koolhof (United Kingdom) N Skupski	7^{7}	6
WC	(Mexico) H Hach Verdugo (Mexico) MÁ Reyes-Varela	6^{5}	3
WC	(Italy) J Berrettini (Italy) M Berrettini	3	4
(France) S Doumbia (France) F Reboul	6	6
3	(United Kingdom) J Murray (New Zealand) M Venus	3	7^{9}	[9]
(Austria) A Erler (Austria) L Miedler	6	6^{7}	[11]
(United States) W Blumberg (Norway) C Ruud	6	6
(France) N Mahut (United Kingdom) J Salisbury	4	4
(Sweden) A Göransson (Japan) B McLachlan	7^{7}	6
Q	(Argentina) G Andreozzi (Argentina) G Durán	6^{4}	4
(United States) M McDonald (United States) B Shelton	7^{7}	6
4	(Colombia) JS Cabal (Colombia) R Farah	6^{5}	4
(United States) N Lammons (United States) J Withrow	6	7^{7}
(Mexico) S González (France) É Roger-Vasselin	4	6^{3}
(Brazil) R Matos (Spain) D Vega Hernández	6	3	[10]
2	(El Salvador) M Arévalo (Netherlands) J-J Rojer	2	6	[2]

Quarterfinals
1	(Netherlands) W Koolhof (United Kingdom) N Skupski	6	6
(France) S Doumbia (France) F Reboul	4	4
(Austria) A Erler (Austria) L Miedler	6	6
(United States) W Blumberg (Norway) C Ruud	4	3
(Sweden) A Göransson (Japan) B McLachlan	6	6^{4}	[11]
(United States) M McDonald (United States) B Shelton	1	7^{7}	[9]
(United States) N Lammons (United States) J Withrow	7^{7}	7^{7}
(Brazil) R Matos (Spain) D Vega Hernández	6^{3}	6^{2}

Semifinals
1	(Netherlands) W Koolhof (United Kingdom) N Skupski	4	6	[4]
(Austria) A Erler (Austria) L Miedler	6	4	[10]
(Sweden) A Göransson (Japan) B McLachlan	5	7^{7}	[11]
(United States) N Lammons (United States) J Withrow	7	6^{2}	[13]

Final
(Austria) A Erler (Austria) L Miedler	7^{11}	7^{7}
(United States) N Lammons (United States) J Withrow	6^{9}	6^{3}

== Qualifying ==
=== Seeds ===
1. (Argentina) Guido Andreozzi / (Argentina) Guillermo Durán (qualified)
2. (Philippines) Ruben Gonzales / (United States) Reese Stalder (qualifying competition)

=== Qualifiers ===
1. (Argentina) Guido Andreozzi / (Argentina) Guillermo Durán

=== Qualifying draw ===
First round
1	(Argentina) Guido Andreozzi (Argentina) Guillermo Durán	6	3	[10]
PR	(United States) Christopher Eubanks (United States) Bradley Klahn	4	6	[7]
WC	(Bolivia) Boris Arias (Bolivia) Federico Zeballos	3	4
2	(Philippines) Ruben Gonzales (United States) Reese Stalder	6	6

Qualifying competition
1	(Argentina) Guido Andreozzi (Argentina) Guillermo Durán	6	6
2	(Philippines) Ruben Gonzales (United States) Reese Stalder	4	2
