= Jackson Withrow =

American tennis player

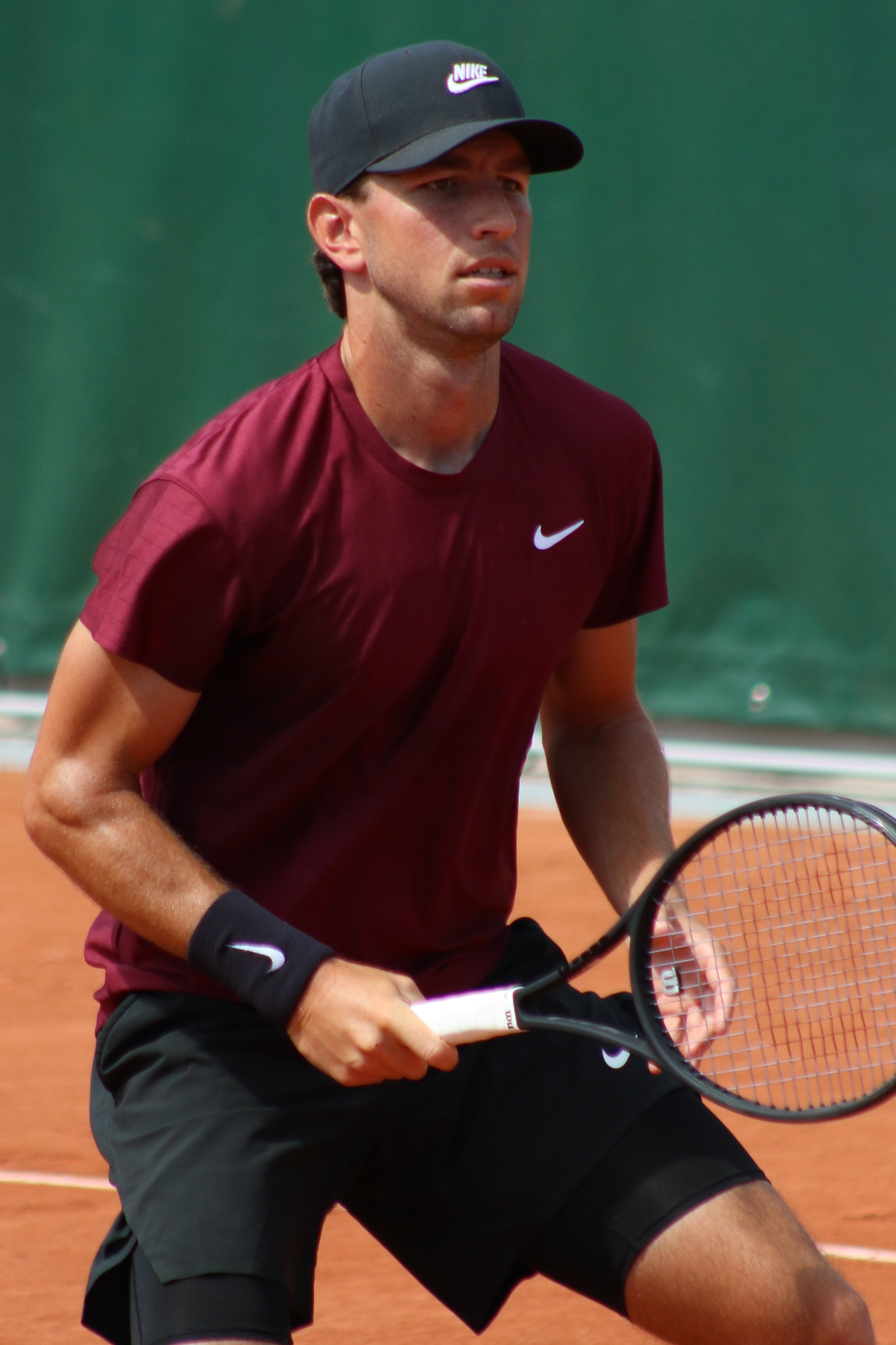
- Withrow at the 2021 French Open
- Country (sports): United States
- Residence: College Station, Texas, US
- Born: July 7, 1993 (age 33) Omaha, Nebraska, United States
- Height: 6 ft 1 in (1.85 m)
- Turned pro: 2016
- Plays: Right-handed (two-handed backhand)
- College: Texas A&M Aggies
- Prize money: US$ 1,752,865

Singles
- Career record: 0–0

Doubles
- Career record: 149–134
- Career titles: 10
- Highest ranking: No. 16 (19 February 2024)
- Current ranking: No. 117 (20 July 2026)

Grand Slam doubles results
- Australian Open: 3R (2019, 2024)
- French Open: 3R (2022)
- Wimbledon: QF (2023)
- US Open: SF (2024)

Grand Slam mixed doubles results
- Australian Open: QF (2025)
- French Open: 1R (2024, 2025)
- Wimbledon: QF (2025)
- US Open: 2R (2019, 2022, 2024)
- Last updated on: 21 July 2026.

Jackson Withrow (born July 7, 1993) is an American professional tennis player who specializes in doubles. Withrow has a career-high ATP doubles ranking of world No. 16 achieved on 19 February 2024. Withrow has won 10 ATP doubles titles.

== Career ==
=== 2011: ATP debut ===
Withrow competed in 2011 US Open doubles, where he received together with his partner Jack Sock a wildcard. In the first round they were beaten by 15-seeded Xavier Malisse from Belgium and Mark Knowles from the Bahamas.

=== 2016: NCAA doubles finalist ===
Withrow played college tennis at Texas A&M.

At the 2016 NCAA Men's Tennis Championship, Withrow and Texas A&M Aggies teammate Arthur Rinderknech lost the individual doubles championship to UCLA's Mackenzie McDonald and Martin Redlicki in the final match.

=== 2017: First ATP win in doubles ===
Withrow and Sock received a wildcard for the 2017 Cincinnati Masters doubles tournament, where they lost to Juan Sebastián Cabal and Fabio Fognini in the first round.

He won his first ATP level doubles match with partner Austin Krajicek at the 2017 US Open by defeating Philipp Oswald and André Sá in the first round.

=== 2018: First ATP doubles title ===
Withrow and Sock made a doubles run to the title at the 2018 Delray Beach Open, first defeating Leander Paes and Purav Raja in the first round. Next the pair upset the Bryan brothers in the quarterfinals in 3 sets, then won their next match to set up a finals match against Nicholas Monroe and John-Patrick Smith. Withrow and Sock prevailed in three sets to win the tournament, marking Withrow's first ever ATP tour-level title as well as his first doubles title.

=== 2019–20: US Open quarterfinal in doubles ===
At the 2019 Australian Open he reached the third round with Jack Sock, defeating second seeded pair and previous year finalists Juan Sebastián Cabal / Robert Farah on the way.

At the 2019 US Open, partnering Sock, he reached his first Grand Slam quarterfinal defeating the Bryan brothers en route but lost to 15th seeded pair of Jamie Murray/Neal Skupski.

He reached a career-high doubles ranking of World No. 66 on 13 January 2020.

=== 2021: New partnership with Lammons, Win over World No. 1 team ===
At the 2021 US Open partnering Nathaniel Lammons they defeated top pair Nikola Mektić and Mate Pavić in the first round in 75 minutes.

=== 2022: Second ATP title, top 50 debut ===
At the 2022 San Diego Open he won his first ATP title as a team with Lammons. The pair moved up 25 places to 35th in the doubles race. He made his top 50 debut in the rankings on 26 September 2022.

The pair Withrow/Lammons ended the season at No. 32 in the ATP doubles rankings.

=== 2023–24: Eight titles, Major and Masters semifinals, top 20 ===
With Lammons, Withrow reached three finals in Auckland, in Dallas and at the ATP 500 Mexican Open in Acapulco. The pair won the Challenger title at the 2023 Arizona Tennis Classic. At the 2023 Miami Open they reached the semifinals of a Masters for the first time but lost to eventual champions Santiago González and Édouard Roger-Vasselin.

During the American summer swing, in the span of two months Withrow and Lammons won three titles at the 2023 Atlanta Open, the 2023 Hall of Fame Open and the 2023 Winston-Salem Open.

Withrow reached the top 25 on 16 October 2023. The pair reached their eight final for the season and second at the ATP 500 level at the 2023 Erste Bank Open in Vienna. At the last Masters of the season in Paris the pair reached the quarterfinals defeating sixth seeds Máximo González and Andrés Molteni.

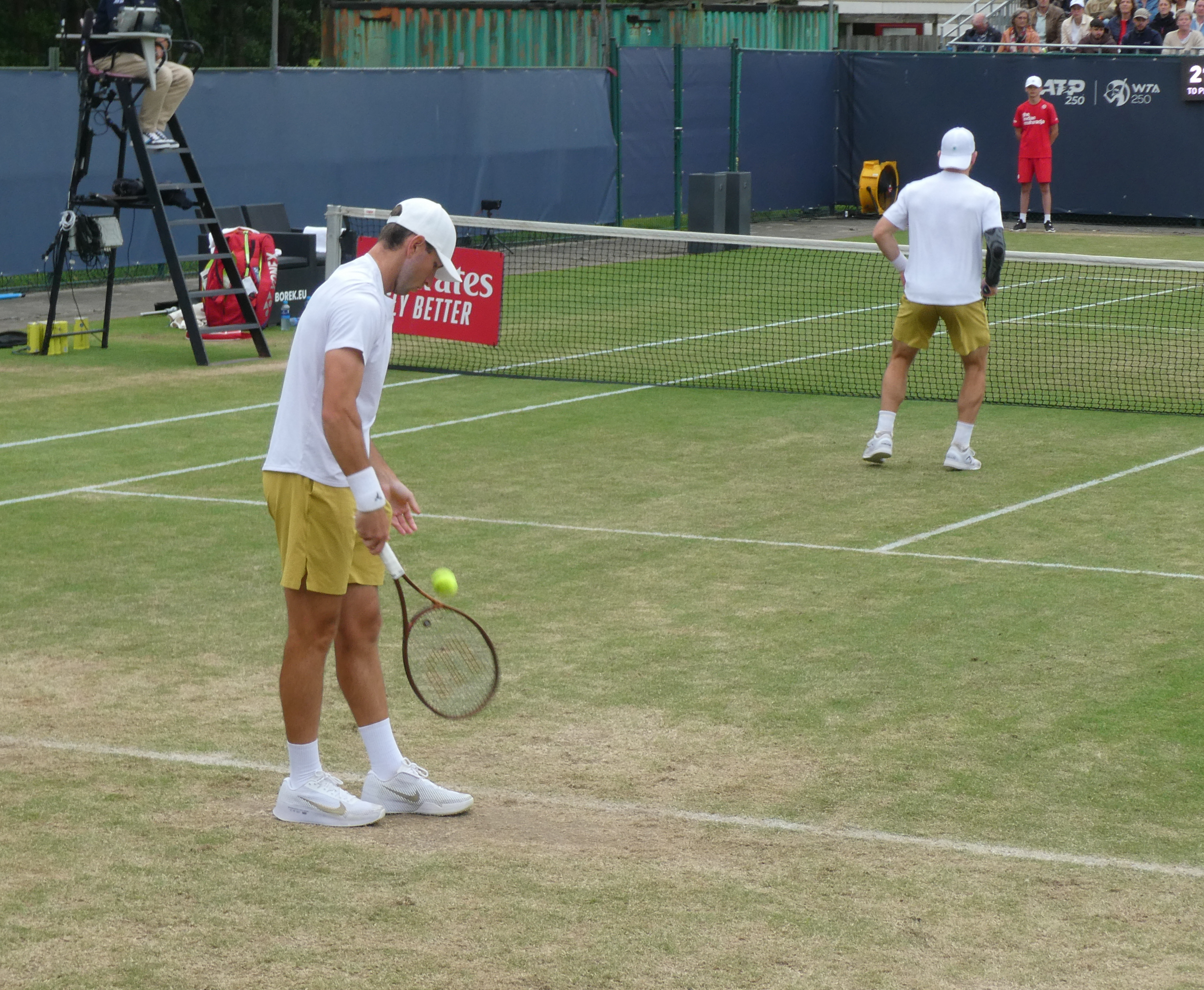
Withrow alongside Nathaniel Lammons at the 2024 Libéma Open

Withrow reached a new career-high ranking of World No. 16 on 19 February 2024. Withrow and Lammons won their sixth title as a pair at the 2024 Libéma Open defeating top seeds Wesley Koolhof and Nikola Mektić.

They successfully defended their Atlanta title making them the last champions at the tournament. The pair captured their first ATP 500 title at the 2024 Mubadala Citi DC Open in Washington D.C. They also successfully defended their Winston-Salem Open title, making it the fourth team title for the season. At the US Open Withrow reached the semifinals of a Grand Slam for the first time in his career, partnering Lammons, with wins over three-time defending champions Joe Salisbury and Rajeev Ram and 13th seeds Wesley Koolhof and Nikola Mektić. They lost to eventual champions Max Purcell and Jordan Thompson in straight sets. At the 2024 Shanghai Masters, they reached the quarterfinals but lost to Wesley Koolhof and Nikola Mektić which halted their attempt to move one position up above their opponents in the ATP doubles race from their current place of No. 9.

== Performance timeline ==
Key
W	F	SF	QF	#R	RR	Q#	P#	DNQ	A	Z#	PO	G	S	B	NMS	NTI	P	NH

(W) winner; (F) finalist; (SF) semifinalist; (QF) quarterfinalist; (#R) rounds 4, 3, 2, 1; (RR) round-robin stage; (Q#) qualification round; (P#) preliminary round; (DNQ) did not qualify; (A) absent; (Z#) Davis/Fed Cup Zonal Group (with number indication) or (PO) play-off; (G) gold, (S) silver or (B) bronze Olympic/Paralympic medal; (NMS) not a Masters tournament; (NTI) not a Tier I tournament; (P) postponed; (NH) not held; (SR) strike rate (events won / competed); (W–L) win–loss record.
To avoid confusion and double counting, these charts are updated at the conclusion of a tournament or when the player's participation has ended.

Current till the 2025 Stockholm Open.

Tournament	2011	...	2016	2017	2018	2019	2020	2021	2022	2023	2024	2025	SR	W–L
Grand Slam tournaments
Australian Open	A		A	A	A	3R	2R	A	2R	1R	3R	2R	0 / 6	6–6
French Open	A		A	A	1R	A	1R	1R	3R	1R	1R	1R	0 / 7	2–7
Wimbledon	A		A	A	1R	A	NH	1R	2R	QF	3R	1R	0 / 6	6–6
US Open	1R		A	2R	2R	QF	2R	2R	2R	QF	SF	2R	0 / 10	16–10
Win–loss	0–1		0–0	1–1	1–3	5–2	2–3	1–3	5–4	6–4	7–4	2–4	0 / 29	30–29
ATP Tour Masters 1000
Indian Wells	A		A	A	A	A	A	A	A	1R	QF	1R	0 / 3	2–3
Miami Open	A		A	A	A	A	A	A	A	SF	2R	2R	0 / 3	5–3
Monte-Carlo Masters	A		A	A	A	A	A	A	A	A	2R	1R	0 / 2	1–2
Madrid Open	A		A	A	A	A	A	A	A	2R	QF	1R	0 / 3	3–3
Italian Open			A	A	A	A	A	A	A	A	1R	1R	0 / 2	0–2
Canadian Open	A		A	A	A	A	A	A	A	2R	1R	1R	0 / 3	1–3
Cincinnati Open	A		A	1R	A	A	A	A	A	1R	1R	1R	0 / 4	0–4
Shanghai Masters	A		A	A	A	A	NH			1R	QF	A	0 / 2	2–2
Paris Masters	A		A	A	A	A	A	A	A	QF	1R	A	0 / 2	2–2
Win–loss	0–0		0–0	0–1	0–0	0–0	0–0	0–0	0–0	7–7	8–9	1–7	0 / 24	16–24
Career statistics
Tournaments	1		0	2	13	5	9	15	19	30	33	26	153	
Titles–Finals	0–0		0–0	0–0	1–2	0–0	0–0	0–0	1–2	4–9	4–4	0–0	10–17	
Overall win–loss	0–1		0–0	1–2	12–12	9–5	3–9	7–15	18–18	53–27	41–29	8–26	152–144	
Year-end ranking	N/A		450	109	87	67	82	90	50	23	19	119	51%	

- Note: No activity between 2012 and 2015.

== ATP finals ==
=== Doubles: 17 (10 titles, 7 runner-ups) ===
Legend Grand Slam Tournaments (0–0) ATP World Tour Finals (0–0) ATP World Tour Masters 1000 (0–0) ATP World Tour 500 Series (1–2) ATP World Tour 250 Series (9–5)	Finals by surface Hard (8–6) Clay (0–1) Grass (2–0)	Finals by setting Outdoor (9–4) Indoor (1–3)

Result	W–L	Date	Tournament	Tier	Surface	Partner	Opponents	Score
Loss	0–1	Feb 2018	Ecuador Open, Ecuador	250 Series	Clay	(United States) Austin Krajicek	(Chile) Nicolás Jarry (Chile) Hans Podlipnik Castillo	6–7^{(6–8)}, 3–6
Win	1–1	Feb 2018	Delray Beach Open, United States	250 Series	Hard	(United States) Jack Sock	(United States) Nicholas Monroe (Australia) John-Patrick Smith	4–6, 6–4, [10–8]
Win	2–1	Sep 2022	San Diego Open, United States	250 Series	Hard	(United States) Nathaniel Lammons	(Australia) Jason Kubler (Australia) Luke Saville	7–6^{(7–5)}, 6–2
Loss	2–2	Oct 2022	Gijón Open, Spain	250 Series	Hard (i)	(United States) Nathaniel Lammons	(Argentina) Máximo González (Argentina) Andrés Molteni	7–6^{(8–6)}, 6–7^{(4–7)}, [5–10]
Loss	2–3	Jan 2023	Auckland Open, New Zealand	250 Series	Hard	(United States) Nathaniel Lammons	(Croatia) Nikola Mektić (Croatia) Mate Pavić	4–6, 7–6^{(7–5)}, [6–10]
Loss	2–4	Feb 2023	Dallas Open, United States	250 Series	Hard (i)	(United States) Nathaniel Lammons	(United Kingdom) Jamie Murray (New Zealand) Michael Venus	6–1, 6–7^{(4–7)}, [7–10]
Loss	2–5	Mar 2023	Mexican Open, Mexico	500 Series	Hard	(United States) Nathaniel Lammons	(Austria) Alexander Erler (Austria) Lucas Miedler	6–7^{(9–11)}, 6–7^{(3–7)}
Win	3–5	Jul 2023	Hall of Fame Open, United States	250 Series	Grass	(United States) Nathaniel Lammons	(United States) William Blumberg (Australia) Max Purcell	6–3, 5–7, [10–5]
Win	4–5	Jul 2023	Atlanta Open, United States	250 Series	Hard	(United States) Nathaniel Lammons	(Australia) Max Purcell (Australia) Jordan Thompson	7–6^{(7–3)}, 7–6^{(7–4)}
Win	5–5	Aug 2023	Winston-Salem Open, United States	250 Series	Hard	(United States) Nathaniel Lammons	(United Kingdom) Lloyd Glasspool (United Kingdom) Neal Skupski	6–3, 6–4
Loss	5–6	Sep 2023	Zhuhai Championships, China	250 Series	Hard	(United States) Nathaniel Lammons	(United Kingdom) Jamie Murray (New Zealand) Michael Venus	4–6, 4–6
Win	6–6	Sep 2023	Astana Open, Kazakhstan	250 Series	Hard (i)	(United States) Nathaniel Lammons	(Croatia) Mate Pavić (Australia) John Peers	7–6^{(7–4)}, 7–6^{(9–7)}
Loss	6–7	Oct 2023	Vienna Open, Austria	500 Series	Hard (i)	(United States) Nathaniel Lammons	(United States) Rajeev Ram (United Kingdom) Joe Salisbury	4–6, 7–5, [10–12]
Win	7–7	Jun 2024	Libéma Open, Netherlands	250 Series	Grass	(United States) Nathaniel Lammons	(Netherlands) Wesley Koolhof (Croatia) Nikola Mektić	7–6^{(7–5)}, 7–6^{(7–3)}
Win	8–7	Jul 2024	Atlanta Open, United States (2)	250 Series	Hard	(United States) Nathaniel Lammons	(Sweden) André Göransson (Netherlands) Sem Verbeek	4–6, 6–4, [12–10]
Win	9–7	Aug 2024	Washington Open, United States	500 Series	Hard	(United States) Nathaniel Lammons	(Brazil) Rafael Matos (Brazil) Marcelo Melo	7–5, 6–3
Win	10–7	Aug 2024	Winston-Salem Open, United States (2)	250 Series	Hard	(United States) Nathaniel Lammons	(United Kingdom) Julian Cash (United States) Robert Galloway	6–4, 6–3

== ATP Challenger and ITF Tour finals ==
=== Doubles: 30 (19–11) ===
Legend ATP Challenger (16–9) ITF Futures (3–2)	Finals by surface Hard (16–10) Clay (3–1)

Result	W–L	Date	Tournament	Tier	Surface	Partner	Opponents	Score
Win	1–0	Jul 2016	USA F25, Edwardsville	Futures	Hard	(United States) Connor Smith	(United Kingdom) Luke Bambridge (Australia) Marc Polmans	6–3, 6–2
Loss	1–1	Sep 2016	Canada F7, Toronto	Futures	Clay	(United States) Hunter Reese	(Mexico) Hans Hach (United States) Rhyne Williams	5–7, 4–6
Loss	1–2	Oct 2016	USA F31, Houston	Futures	Hard	(United States) Hunter Reese	(Mexico) Hans Hach (United States) Rhyne Williams	3–6, 3–6
Win	2–2	Jan 2017	USA F2, Long Beach	Futures	Hard	(United States) Austin Krajicek	(United Kingdom) Luke Bambridge (United Kingdom) Joe Salisbury	6–3, 3–6, [10–8]
Win	3–2	Jan 2017	Maui, USA	Challenger	Hard	(United States) Austin Krajicek	(United States) Bradley Klahn (United States) Tennys Sandgren	6–4, 6–3
Win	4–2	Feb 2017	Morelos, Mexico	Challenger	Hard	(United States) Austin Krajicek	(United States) Kevin King (South Africa) Dean O'Brien	6–7^{(4–7)}, 7–6^{(7–5)}, [11–9]
Win	5–2	Jul 2017	USA F21, Tulsa	Futures	Hard	(United States) Austin Krajicek	(United States) Tommy Paul (United States) Nathan Ponwith	6–4, 6–2
Win	6–2	Jul 2017	Gatineau, Canada	Challenger	Hard	(United States) Bradley Klahn	(Mexico) Hans Hach (France) Vincent Millot	6–2, 6–3
Win	7–2	Jul 2017	Granby, Canada	Challenger	Hard	(United Kingdom) Joe Salisbury	(Uruguay) Marcel Felder (Japan) Go Soeda	4–6, 6–3, [10–6]
Loss	7–3	Nov 2017	Shenzhen, China, P.R.	Challenger	Hard	(United States) Austin Krajicek	(India) Sriram Balaji (India) Vishnu Vardhan	6–7^{(3–7)}, 6–7^{(3–7)}
Loss	7–4	Nov 2017	Hua Hin, Thailand	Challenger	Hard	(United States) Austin Krajicek	(Thailand) Sanchai Ratiwatana (Thailand) Sonchat Ratiwatana	4–6, 7–5, [5–10]
Win	8–4	Mar 2018	Indian Wells, USA	Challenger	Hard	(United States) Austin Krajicek	(United States) Evan King (United States) Nathan Pasha	6–7^{(3–7)}, 6–1, [11–9]
Win	9–4	Jun 2019	Columbus, USA	Challenger	Hard (i)	(Venezuela) Roberto Maytín	(Mexico) Hans Hach (United States) Donald Young	6–7^{(4–7)}, 7–6^{(7–2)}, [10–5]
Loss	9–5	Aug 2019	Lexington, USA	Challenger	Hard	(Venezuela) Roberto Maytín	(Ecuador) Diego Hidalgo (United States) Martin Redlicki	2–6, 2–6
Win	10–5	Sep 2019	Columbus, USA	Challenger	Hard	(United States) Martin Redlicki	(United States) Nathan Pasha (United States) Max Schnur	6–4, 7–6^{(7–4)}
Loss	10–6	Nov 2020	Orlando, USA	Challenger	Hard	(United States) Mitchell Krueger	(Kazakhstan) Andrey Golubev (Kazakhstan) Aleksandr Nedovyesov	5–7, 4–6
Win	11–6	Mar 2021	Nur-Sultan, Kazakhstan	Challenger	Hard (i)	(United States) Nathaniel Lammons	(United States) Nathan Pasha (United States) Max Schnur	6–4, 6–2
Win	12–6	May 2021	Heilbronn, Germany	Challenger	Clay	(United States) Nathaniel Lammons	(Sweden) André Göransson (Netherlands) Sem Verbeek	6–7^{(4–7)}, 6–4, [10–8]
Win	13–6	Nov 2021	Champaign, USA	Challenger	Hard (i)	(United States) Nathaniel Lammons	(Philippines) Treat Huey (United States) Max Schnur	6–4, 3–6, [10–6]
Loss	13–7	Feb 2022	Cleveland, USA	Challenger	Hard (i)	(United States) Robert Galloway	(United States) William Blumberg (United States) Max Schnur	3–6, 6–7^{(4–7)}
Win	14–7	Apr 2022	Sarasota, USA	Challenger	Clay	(United States) Robert Galloway	(Sweden) André Göransson (United States) Nathaniel Lammons	6–3, 7–6^{(7–3)}
Win	15–7	Jul 2022	Salzburg, Austria	Challenger	Clay	(United States) Nathaniel Lammons	(Austria) Alexander Erler (Austria) Lucas Miedler	7–5, 5–7, [11–9]
Win	16–7	Sep 2022	Cary, USA	Challenger	Hard	(United States) Nathaniel Lammons	(Philippines) Treat Huey (Australia) John-Patrick Smith	7–5, 2–6, [10–5]
Win	17–7	Mar 2023	Phoenix, USA	Challenger	Hard	(United States) Nathaniel Lammons	(Monaco) Hugo Nys (Poland) Jan Zieliński	6–7^{(1–7)}, 6–4, [10–8]
Loss	17–8	Oct 2025	Roanne, France	Challenger	Hard (i)	(Belgium) Joran Vliegen	(United States) Vasil Kirkov (Netherlands) Bart Stevens	6–4, 1–6, [4–10]
Loss	17–9	Mar 2026	Morelia, Mexico	Challenger	Hard	(United States) Nathaniel Lammons	(Ecuador) Diego Hidalgo (United States) Patrik Trhac	6–7^{(5–7)}, 6–7^{(4–7)}
Loss	17–10	May 2026	Chișinău, Moldova	Challenger	Hard	(United States) Nathaniel Lammons	(United States) George Goldhoff (United States) Theodore Winegar	1–6, 4–6
Win	18–10	Jul 2026	Lincoln, USA	Challenger	Hard	(United States) Nathaniel Lammons	(United States) George Goldhoff (Canada) Cleeve Harper	6–3, 6–3
Win	19–10	Jul 2026	Vancouver, Canada	Challenger	Hard	(United States) Nathaniel Lammons	(United States) Daniel Milavsky (United States) Braden Shick	7–6^{(9–7)}, 7–6^{(7–1)}
Loss	19–11	Sep 2026	Tiburon, USA	Challenger	Hard	(United States) Nathaniel Lammons	(Mexico) Hans Hach Verdugo (United States) JJ Tracy	6–7^{(7–9)}, 4–6
