= 2024 Atlanta Open – Singles =

Singles
- 2024 Atlanta Open

Final
- Champion: (Japan) Yoshihito Nishioka
- Runner-up: (Australia) Jordan Thompson
- Score: 4–6, 7–6^{(7–2)}, 6–2

Details
- Draw: 28
- Seeds: 8

Events
Singles	Doubles
← 2023 ·	Atlanta Open

Yoshihito Nishioka defeated Jordan Thompson in the final, 4–6, 7–6^{(7–2)}, 6–2 to win the singles title at the 2024 Atlanta Open. It was his third ATP Tour title. Nishioka became the first unseeded player to win the tournament since Robby Ginepri in 2009, and was the first (and only) singles champion to not be from Australia or the United States.

Taylor Fritz was the reigning champion, but chose to participate in the Olympics starting the same week.

Thompson and Alejandro Davidovich Fokina played the longest match in the tournament’s history in the quarterfinals, lasting three hours and three minutes.

== Seeds ==
The top four seeds received a bye into the second round.

1. (United States) Ben Shelton (second round)
2. (France) Adrian Mannarino (second round)
3. (United States) Frances Tiafoe (quarterfinals)
4. (Australia) Jordan Thompson (final)
5. (Spain) Alejandro Davidovich Fokina (quarterfinals)
6. (Serbia) Miomir Kecmanović (first round)
7. (United States) Brandon Nakashima (first round)
8. (Australia) Max Purcell (quarterfinals)

== Draw ==
=== Key ===
- Q = Qualifier
- WC = Wild card
- LL = Lucky loser
- Alt = Alternate
- ITF = ITF entry
- PR = Protected ranking
- SR = Special ranking
- SE = Special exempt
- JE = Junior exempt
- JR = Junior Accelerator Programme entrant
- CO = College Accelerator Programme entrant
- NG = Next Gen Accelerator Program entrant
- w/o = Walkover
- r = Retired
- d = Defaulted

=== Finals ===
Semifinals
Q	(China) Shang Juncheng	3	6	3
4	(Australia) Jordan Thompson	6	4	6
(Japan) Yoshihito Nishioka	6	4	6
(France) Arthur Rinderknech	3	6	4

Final
4	(Australia) Jordan Thompson	6	6^{2}	2
(Japan) Yoshihito Nishioka	4	7^{7}	6

=== Top half ===
First round
WC	(United States) A Martin	1	1
Q	(China) J Shang	6	6
WC	(Canada) D Shapovalov	4	6	1
(Belgium) D Goffin	6	3	6
(Australia) C O'Connell	6	5	2
8	(Australia) M Purcell	4	7	6
LL	(France) H Mayot	7^{11}	6
(Croatia) B Ćorić	6^{9}	3
SE	(United States) R Opelka	6	7^{7}
(United States) A Kovacevic	3	6^{5}
(France) A Cazaux	2	6^{4}
5/WC	(Spain) A Davidovich Fokina	6	7^{7}

Second round
1	(United States) B Shelton	6^{6}	4
Q	(China) J Shang	7^{8}	6
(Belgium) D Goffin	3	3
8	(Australia) M Purcell	6	6
4	(Australia) J Thompson	6	7
LL	(France) H Mayot	2	5
SE	(United States) R Opelka	5	5
5/WC	(Spain) A Davidovich Fokina	7	7

Quarterfinals
Q	(China) J Shang	7^{7}	6
8	(Australia) M Purcell	6^{3}	4
4	(Australia) J Thompson	7^{7}	4	6
5/WC	(Spain) A Davidovich Fokina	6^{5}	6	3

Semifinals
Q	(China) J Shang	3	6	3
4	(Australia) J Thompson	6	4	6

=== Bottom half ===
First round
7	(United States) B Nakashima	2	4
(United States) M McDonald	6	6
Q	(United States) Z Svajda	6^{4}	3
(Japan) Y Nishioka	7^{7}	6
A Karatsev	6	6
Q	(United Kingdom) B Harris	2	2
6	(Serbia) M Kecmanović	4	4
LL	(Australia) A Walton	6	6
(France) A Rinderknech	6	6
LL	(United States) JJ Wolf	3	2
Q	(Italy) M Bellucci	1	6	3
(Australia) A Vukic	6	4	1^{r}

Second round
(United States) M McDonald	3	4
(Japan) Y Nishioka	6	6
A Karatsev	4	6	3
3	(United States) F Tiafoe	6	3	6
LL	(Australia) A Walton	6^{4}	3
(France) A Rinderknech	7^{7}	6
Q	(Italy) M Bellucci	7^{8}	4	6
2	(France) A Mannarino	6^{6}	6	3

Quarterfinals
(Japan) Y Nishioka	7^{7}	6
3	(United States) F Tiafoe	6^{2}	2
(France) A Rinderknech	7^{7}	3	6
Q	(Italy) M Bellucci	6^{5}	6	1

Semifinals
(Japan) Y Nishioka	6	4	6
(France) A Rinderknech	3	6	4

== Qualifying ==
=== Seeds ===
1. (China) Shang Juncheng (qualified)
2. (Australia) Adam Walton (qualifying competition, lucky loser)
3. (United States) Zachary Svajda (qualified)
4. (United Kingdom) Billy Harris (qualified)
5. (United States) J. J. Wolf (qualifying competition, lucky loser)
6. (France) Térence Atmane (withdrew)
7. (France) Harold Mayot (qualifying competition, lucky loser)
8. (Italy) Mattia Bellucci (qualified)

=== Qualifiers ===
1. (China) Shang Juncheng
2. (Italy) Mattia Bellucci
3. (United States) Zachary Svajda
4. (United Kingdom) Billy Harris

=== Lucky losers ===
1. (Australia) Adam Walton
2. (United States) J. J. Wolf
3. (France) Harold Mayot

=== Qualifying draw ===
==== First qualifier ====
First round
1	(China) Shang Juncheng	3	6	6
(United Kingdom) Liam Broady	6	1	3
WC	(United States) Kevin King	6^{3}	5
5	(United States) J. J. Wolf	7^{7}	7

Qualifying competition
1	(China) Shang Juncheng	6	6
5	(United States) J. J. Wolf	4	2

==== Second qualifier ====
First round
2	(Australia) Adam Walton	6	6
(Japan) Shintaro Mochizuki	4	2
(Kazakhstan) Denis Yevseyev	2	1
8	(Italy) Mattia Bellucci	6	6

Qualifying competition
2	(Australia) Adam Walton	6^{4}	6	1
8	(Italy) Mattia Bellucci	7^{7}	3	6

==== Third qualifier ====
First round
3	(United States) Zachary Svajda	6	7
(United States) Ethan Quinn	4	5
(Moldova) Radu Albot	3	6	5
Alt	(United States) Maxime Cressy	6	3	7

Qualifying competition
3	(United States) Zachary Svajda	4	7^{7}	6
Alt	(United States) Maxime Cressy	6	6^{2}	4

==== Fourth qualifier ====
First round
4	(United Kingdom) Billy Harris	6	6
WC	(United States) Nate Bonetto	4	3
(United States) Emilio Nava	3	7	4
7	(France) Harold Mayot	6	5	6

Qualifying competition
4	(United Kingdom) Billy Harris	6	6^{9}	6
7	(France) Harold Mayot	3	7^{11}	4
