= 2021 Heilbronner Neckarcup – Doubles =

Doubles
- 2021 Heilbronner Neckarcup

Final
- Champions: (United States) Nathaniel Lammons (United States) Jackson Withrow
- Runners-up: (Sweden) André Göransson (Netherlands) Sem Verbeek
- Score: 6–7^{(4–7)}, 6–4, [10–8]

Events
Singles	Doubles
← 2019 ·	Heilbronner Neckarcup	· 2022 →

Kevin Krawietz and Andreas Mies were the defending champions but chose not to defend their title.

Nathaniel Lammons and Jackson Withrow won the title after defeating André Göransson and Sem Verbeek 6–7^{(4–7)}, 6–4, [10–8] in the final.

== Seeds ==
1. (Pakistan) Aisam-ul-Haq Qureshi / (Belarus) Andrei Vasilevski (semifinals)
2. (Netherlands) Sander Arends / (India) Divij Sharan (semifinals)
3. (United States) Nathaniel Lammons / (United States) Jackson Withrow (champions)
4. (Brazil) Rafael Matos / (Brazil) Felipe Meligeni Alves (quarterfinals)

== Draw ==
=== Key ===
- Q = Qualifier
- WC = Wild card
- LL = Lucky loser
- Alt = Alternate
- SE = Special exempt
- PR = Protected ranking
- ITF = ITF entry
- JE = Junior exempt
- w/o = Walkover
- r = Retired
- d = Defaulted
- SR = Special ranking

First round
(United Kingdom) L Glasspool (Australia) M Reid	3	6	[10]
(Venezuela) LD Martínez (Spain) D Vega Hernández	6	4	[8]
4	(Brazil) R Matos (Brazil) F Meligeni Alves	6	6
(Croatia) I Sabanov (Croatia) M Sabanov	3	0
(Germany) D Masur (Ukraine) D Molchanov	6^{2}	6^{3}
(Sweden) A Göransson (Netherlands) S Verbeek	7^{7}	7^{7}
WC	(Turkey) T Altuna (Turkey) A Çelikbilek	4	4
(United States) D Kudla (United States) M McDonald	6	6
(Colombia) DE Galán (Netherlands) T Griekspoor
3	(United States) N Lammons (United States) J Withrow	w/o
(Australia) M Polmans (New Zealand) A Sitak	6	6
WC	(Germany) A Begemann (Germany) D Brown	4	4
(Japan) T Daniel (Spain) B Zapata Miralles	2	5
2	(Netherlands) S Arends (India) D Sharan	6	7

Quarterfinals
1	(Pakistan) A-u-H Qureshi (Belarus) A Vasilevski	7^{7}	6
(United Kingdom) L Glasspool (Australia) M Reid	6^{1}	4
4	(Brazil) R Matos (Brazil) F Meligeni Alves	4	6^{5}
(Sweden) A Göransson (Netherlands) S Verbeek	6	7^{7}
(United States) D Kudla (United States) M McDonald	6^{4}	2
3	(United States) N Lammons (United States) J Withrow	7^{7}	6
(Australia) M Polmans (New Zealand) A Sitak	2	6	[8]
2	(Netherlands) S Arends (India) D Sharan	6	3	[10]

Semifinals
1	(Pakistan) A-u-H Qureshi (Belarus) A Vasilevski	4	4
(Sweden) A Göransson (Netherlands) S Verbeek	6	6
3	(United States) N Lammons (United States) J Withrow	6	6
2	(Netherlands) S Arends (India) D Sharan	3	3

Final
(Sweden) A Göransson (Netherlands) S Verbeek	7^{7}	4	[8]
3	(United States) N Lammons (United States) J Withrow	6^{4}	6	[10]
