= 2023 Abierto Mexicano Telcel =

- Date: 27 February – 4 March
- Edition: 30th
- Draw: 32S / 16D
- Prize money: $2,013,940
- Surface: Hard, outdoor
- Location: Acapulco, Mexico
- Venue: Arena GNP Seguros

Champions

Singles
- (Australia) Alex de Minaur

Doubles
- (Austria) Alexander Erler / (Austria) Lucas Miedler
← 2022 ·	Mexican Open	· 2024 →

The 2023 Mexican Open (also known as the Abierto Mexicano Telcel presentado por HSBC for sponsorship reasons) was a professional tennis tournament played on outdoor hard courts. It was the 30th edition of the men's Mexican Open, and part of the 2023 ATP Tour. The tournament took place in Acapulco, Mexico between 27 February and 4 March 2023, at the Arena GNP Seguros.

== Finals ==
=== Singles ===
- (Australia) Alex de Minaur def. (United States) Tommy Paul, 3–6, 6–4, 6–1

=== Doubles ===
- (Austria) Alexander Erler / (Austria) Lucas Miedler def. (United States) Nathaniel Lammons / (United States) Jackson Withrow, 7–6^{(11–9)}, 7–6^{(7–3)}

== Points distribution and prize money ==
=== Points distribution ===
The players would receive the following points:

Event	W	F	SF	QF	Round of 16	Round of 32	Q	Q2	Q1
Singles	500	300	180	90	45	0	20	10	0
Doubles	500	300	180	90	0	—	—	—	—

=== Prize money ===
Event	W	F	SF	QF	Round of 16	Round of 32	Q2	Q1
Singles	$376,620	$202,640	$108,000	$55,170	$29,455	$15,710	$8,050	$4,515
Doubles*	$123,710	$65,980	$33,380	$16,690	$8,640	—	—	—
Doubles prize money per team

== Singles main-draw entrants ==
=== Seeds ===
Country	Player	Ranking^{1}	Seed
~~ESP~~	~~Carlos Alcaraz~~	~~2~~	~~1~~
NOR	Casper Ruud	4	2
USA	Taylor Fritz	7	3
DEN	Holger Rune	10	4
~~GBR~~	~~Cameron Norrie~~	~~13~~	~~5~~
USA	Frances Tiafoe	15	6
USA	Tommy Paul	21	7
AUS	Alex de Minaur	23	8

- ^{1} Rankings as of 20 February 2023.

=== Other entrants ===
The following players received wildcards into the main draw:

- (Spain) Feliciano López
- (Mexico) Rodrigo Pacheco Méndez
- (United States) Ben Shelton

The following players received entry from the qualifying draw:

- (Argentina) Guido Andreozzi
- (Italy) Jacopo Berrettini
- (United States) Nick Chappell
- (Japan) Taro Daniel

The following players received entry as lucky losers:

- (Italy) Luciano Darderi
- (Sweden) Elias Ymer

=== Withdrawals ===
- (Spain) Carlos Alcaraz → replaced by (Italy) Luciano Darderi
- (United States) Jenson Brooksby → replaced by (United States) Christopher Eubanks
- (France) Richard Gasquet → replaced by (United States) Michael Mmoh
- (United States) Sebastian Korda → replaced by (United States) Mackenzie McDonald
- (United Kingdom) Cameron Norrie → replaced by (Sweden) Elias Ymer
- (United States) Reilly Opelka → replaced by (Germany) Daniel Altmaier
- (Greece) Stefanos Tsitsipas → replaced by (Germany) Oscar Otte

== Doubles main-draw entrants ==
=== Seeds ===
Country	Player	Country	Player	Rank^{1}	Seed
NED	Wesley Koolhof	GBR	Neal Skupski	4	1
ESA	Marcelo Arévalo	NED	Jean-Julien Rojer	10	2
GBR	Jamie Murray	NZL	Michael Venus	47	3
COL	Juan Sebastián Cabal	COL	Robert Farah	48	4

- ^{1} Rankings as of 20 February 2023.

=== Other entrants ===
The following pairs received wildcards into the doubles main draw:

- (Italy) Jacopo Berrettini / (Italy) Matteo Berrettini
- (Mexico) Hans Hach Verdugo / (Mexico) Miguel Ángel Reyes-Varela

The following pair received entry from the qualifying draw:

- (Argentina) Guido Andreozzi / (Argentina) Guillermo Durán

=== Withdrawals ===
- (Spain) Marcel Granollers / (Argentina) Horacio Zeballos → replaced by (United States) William Blumberg / (Norway) Casper Ruud
- (United States) Sebastian Korda / (United States) Mackenzie McDonald → replaced by (United States) Mackenzie McDonald / (United States) Ben Shelton
- (Spain) Feliciano López / (Greece) Stefanos Tsitsipas → replaced by (Sweden) André Göransson / (Japan) Ben McLachlan
