= Bryce Nakashima =

American tennis player

- Country (sports): United States
- Born: February 20, 2004 (age 22) San Diego, California, US
- Height: 6 ft 0 in (1.83 m)
- Plays: Right-handed (two-handed backhand)
- College: Ohio State
- Prize money: US $52,293

Singles
- Career record: 0–0
- Career titles: 0
- Highest ranking: No. 557 (November 16, 2026)
- Current ranking: No. 557 (November 16, 2026)

Doubles
- Career record: 0–2
- Career titles: 0
- Highest ranking: No. 632 (May 6, 2024)

Grand Slam doubles results
- US Open: 1R (2026)
- Last updated on: November 16, 2026.

Bryce Nakashima (born February 20, 2004) is an American tennis player. He has been ranked as high as world No. 557 in singles by the ATP achieved on November 16, 2026 and a doubles ranking of No. 632 achieved on May 6, 2024.

== Personal life ==
Nakashima's brother, Brandon, is also a professional tennis player.

== College career ==
As a freshman in 2024, Nakashima went 5–0 in singles at Ohio State.

== Professional career ==
Nakashima won his first ITF doubles title in May 2022, winning the M15 Cancun title with Juan Sebastián Gómez.

In July 2024, Nakashima made his ATP Tour debut, partnering his brother Brandon Nakashima in the Atlanta Open. In the first round, the pair lost to Wimbledon finalists Jordan Thompson and Max Purcell 6–4, 2–6, [9–11].

Bryce won his first ITF title in singles at Champaign in Illinois in August 2026. It was a M15 title.

== Career finals ==
=== Doubles: 8 (4–4) ===
Legend ATP Challenger (0–0) ITF World Tennis Tour (4–4)	Finals by surface Hard (4–4) Clay (0–0) Grass (0–0) Carpet (0–0)

Result	W–L	Date	Tournament	Tier	Surface	Partner	Opponents	Score
Win	1–0	May 2022	M15 Cancún, Mexico	World Tennis Tour	Hard	(Colombia) Juan Sebastián Gómez	(United States) Jake Bhangdia (India) Dhruv Sunish	6–3, 6–4
Loss	1–1	Jul 2022	M15 Lakewood, USA	World Tennis Tour	Hard	(United States) Bjorn Swenson	(United States) Eduardo Nava (United States) Nathan Ponwith	3–6, 6–2, [4–10]
Win	2–1	Jun 2023	M15 Rancho Santa Fe, USA	World Tennis Tour	Hard	(United States) Jack Anthrop	(United Kingdom) Aidan McHugh (United States) Keegan Smith	6–1, 6–4
Loss	2–2	Jun 2023	M15 San Diego, USA	World Tennis Tour	Hard	(United States) Quinn Vandecasteele	(United States) Colin Markes (United States) Andrew Rogers	4–6, 4–6
Win	3–2	Jul 2023	M15 Irvine, USA	World Tennis Tour	Hard	(United States) Learner Tien	(United Kingdom) Joshua Goodger (United Kingdom) Matthew Summers	6–4, 6–2
Loss	3–3	Jul 2023	M15 Lakewood, USA	World Tennis Tour	Hard	(United States) Jack Anthrop	(United States) Ryan Seggerman (United States) Patrik Trhac	5–7, 2–6
Win	4–3	Nov 2023	M25 Columbus, USA	World Tennis Tour	Hard	(United States) Robert Cash	(Japan) Shunsuke Mitsui (United Kingdom) Johannus Monday	7–5, 7–6^{(12–10)}
Loss	4–4	Jun 2024	M15 Los Angeles, USA	World Tennis Tour	Hard	(United States) Jack Anthrop	(Australia) Joshua Charlton (United States) Patrick Maloney	6–7^{(5–7)}, 6–7^{(6–8)}
Win	5–4	Nov 2024	M25 Columbus, USA	World Tennis Tour	Hard	(United States) Jack Anthrop	(United Kingdom) Adam Jones (United States) Jake van Emburgh	6–3, 6–2
