= Nick Chappell =

American tennis player

- Country (sports): United States
- Born: September 19, 1992 (age 33) Toronto, Ontario, Canada
- Height: 1.78 m (5 ft 10 in)
- Plays: Left-handed (two-handed backhand)
- College: TCU
- Prize money: $169,647

Singles
- Career record: 0–2 (at ATP Tour level, Grand Slam level, and in Davis Cup)
- Career titles: 0
- Highest ranking: No. 329 (November 8, 2021)
- Current ranking: No. 734 (July 14, 2025)

Doubles
- Career titles: 0
- Highest ranking: No. 416 (June 27, 2016)
- Current ranking: No. 613 (July 14, 2025)
- Last updated on: 15 July 2025.

Nick Chappell (born September 19, 1992) is a Canadian-born American tennis player.

Chappell has a career high ATP singles ranking of world No. 329 achieved on November 8, 2021. He also has a career high ATP doubles ranking of No. 416 achieved on June 27, 2016.

== Career ==
In December 2019, Chappell lost the ITF World Tennis Tour M15 in Cancun, Mexico final as the No. 3 seed to No. 4 seed Vasil Kirkov in a close match with a scoreline of 6-7(3), 7-6(8), 7-6(1).

Chappell made his ATP main draw debut at the 2022 Los Cabos Open after qualifying for the main draw in singles, defeating Maxime Janvier and Aziz Dougaz to qualify, but lost to NextGen player Tseng Chun-hsin.

He also qualified for the ATP 500, the 2023 Mexican Open in Acapulco, defeating second qualifying seed Steve Johnson and New Zealander Rubin Statham.

== ATP Challenger and ITF Tour Finals ==
=== Singles: 12 (2–10) ===
Legend ATP Challenger Tour (0–0) ITF Futures/World Tennis Tour (2–10)	Finals by surface Hard (2–10) Clay (0–0) Grass (0–0) Carpet (0–0)

Result	W–L Date	Tournament	Tier	Surface	Opponent	Score	
Loss	0–1	Jun 2016	Israel F9, Kiryat Shmona	Futures	Hard	(Israel) Edan Leshem	3–6, 3–6
Loss	0–2	Jun 2016	Israel F10, Acre	Futures	Hard	(Israel) Edan Leshem	2–6, 1–6
Win	1–2	Sep 2018	Canada F7, Toronto	Futures	Hard	(United Kingdom) Lloyd Glasspool	6–2, 6–0
Loss	1–3	Jun 2019	M25 Cancún, Mexico	World Tour	Hard	(Argentina) Axel Geller	3–6, 6–7^{(4–7)}
Loss	1–4	Sep 2019	M15 Fayetteville, USA	World Tour	Hard	(Australia) Rinky Hijikata	6–2, 2–6, 1–6
Loss	1–5	Nov 2019	M15 Cancún, Mexico	World Tour	Hard	(Brazil) Mateus Alves	6–2, 1–6, 4–6
Win	2–5	Nov 2019	M15 Cancún, Mexico	World Tour	Hard	(Peru) Jorge Panta	6–3, 6–3
Loss	2–6	Dec 2019	M15 Cancún, Mexico	World Tour	Hard	(United States) Vasil Kirkov	7–6^{(7–3)}, 6–7^{(8–10)}, 6–7^{(1–7)}
Loss	2–7	Oct 2020	M15 Sharm El Sheikh, Egypt	World Tour	Hard	(Latvia) Mārtiņš Podžus	4–6, 6–1, 5–7
Loss	2–8	Oct 2020	M25 Tulsa, USA	World Tour	Hard	(Australia) Adam Walton	1–6, 3–6
Loss	2–9	Oct 2023	M15 Davangere, India	World Tour	Hard	(Russia) Bogdan Bobrov	3–6, 6–7 ^{(4–7)}
Loss	2–10	Jan 2024	M25 Wesley Chapel, USA	World Tour	Hard	(Dominican Republic) Roberto Cid Subervi	2–6, 3–6
