= Yoshihito Nishioka =

Japanese tennis player (born 1995)

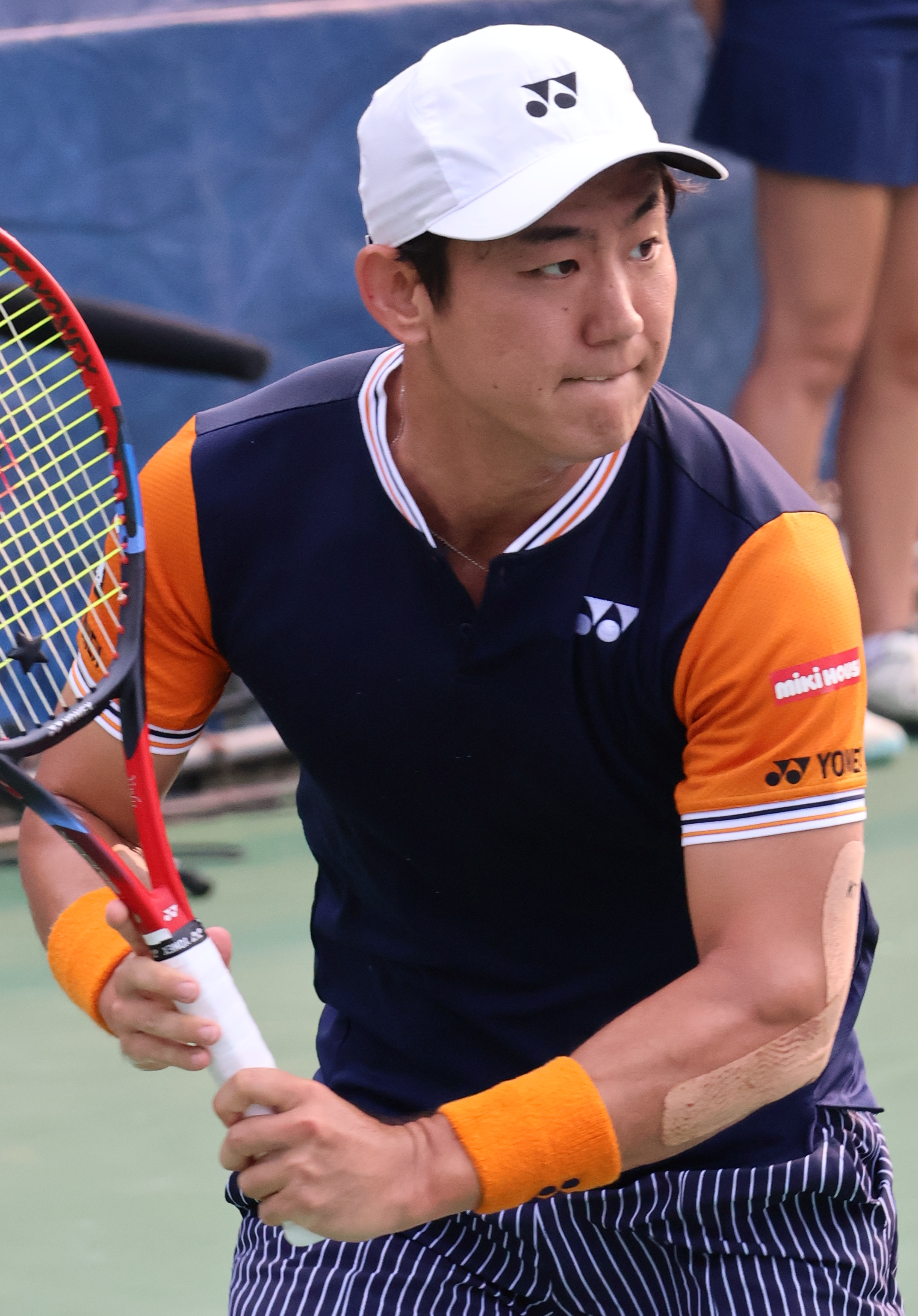
- Nishioka at the 2023 Washington Open
- Country (sports): Japan
- Born: 27 September 1995 (age 31) Tsu, Japan
- Height: 1.70 m (5 ft 7 in)
- Turned pro: 2014
- Plays: Left-handed (two-handed backhand), born right-handed
- Coach: Christian Zahalka
- Prize money: US $ 6,926,298

Singles
- Career record: 145–165
- Career titles: 3
- Highest ranking: No. 24 (19 June 2023)
- Current ranking: No. 112 (10 November 2025)

Grand Slam singles results
- Australian Open: 4R (2023)
- French Open: 4R (2023)
- Wimbledon: 2R (2021, 2024)
- US Open: 2R (2015, 2019)

Other tournaments
- Olympic Games: 1R (2021)

Doubles
- Career record: 14–33
- Career titles: 0
- Highest ranking: No. 210 (1 July 2019)

Grand Slam doubles results
- Australian Open: 2R (2023)
- French Open: 2R (2019, 2021)
- Wimbledon: 1R (2018, 2021)
- US Open: 2R (2018, 2022, 2023)
Medal record
Men's tennis
Representing Japan
Asian Games
Gold medal – first place	2014 Incheon	Singles
Bronze medal – third place	2014 Incheon	Team Event
- Last updated on: 10 November 2025.

Yoshihito Nishioka (西岡 良仁, Nishioka Yoshihito; born 27 September 1995) is a Japanese professional tennis player. He has won three ATP Tour singles titles and achieved a career-high ATP singles ranking of world No. 24 on 19 June 2023. He is currently the No. 4 Japanese player.

== Personal life ==
Nishioka married longtime girlfriend former weather forecaster Saya Hiyama in December 2024.

== Career ==
=== Junior career ===
As a junior, he compiled a 113–49 win-loss record in singles (and 63–45 in doubles), achieving a combined ranking of No. 12 in the world in January 2012.

==== Junior Grand Slam singles results ====
- Australian Open: 3R (2013)
- French Open: 2R (2012, 2013)
- Wimbledon: 2R (2012, 2013)
- US Open: SF (2012)

=== 2014 ===
Nishioka qualified for the US Open in his first Grand Slam qualifying appearance, but was forced to retire in the first round match against Paolo Lorenzi because of illness. The next week, he claimed his first ATP Challenger Tour title in Shanghai by beating Somdev Devvarman in the final.

In September, Nishioka earned the men's singles gold medal in the 2014 Asian Games at Incheon, where he upset top seed Lu Yen-hsun of Chinese Taipei in the final. He also became the first Japanese men's singles champion since Toshiro Sakai, who won the 1974 Asian Games in Tehran.

=== 2015 ===
Nishioka qualified for the Delray Beach Open in February. He beat Igor Sijsling in the first round to record his first ATP main-draw win. He followed that up with a straight-sets win over Marinko Matosevic to become the first teenage qualifier to reach the quarterfinals of the tournament since his countryman Kei Nishikori. He lost to Bernard Tomic in straight sets.

During the spring clay court season, Nishioka made his debut at the French Open, losing to fourth seed Tomáš Berdych in the first round. In the 2015 US Open, Nishioka advanced to the second round of a Major for the first time in his career, beating fellow qualifier Paul-Henri Mathieu in five sets. He was beaten by 30th seed Thomaz Bellucci in the next round. In November, he ended the 2015 season with his second challenger title in Toyota, beating Alexander Kudryavtsev in the final.

=== 2016: Miami Open third round, Top 100 ===
By winning the Asia-Pacific wildcard play-offs in Shenzhen, Nishioka earned a wildcard into the Australian Open. However, he fell in the first round to Pablo Cuevas. In February, he reached the quarterfinal of the Memphis Open as a qualifier, winning over Jared Donaldson and Illya Marchenko along the way. He lost to fourth seed Sam Querrey in straight sets. He then qualified for the Miami Open to make his ATP World Tour Masters 1000 main-draw debut, getting to the third round after beating fellow qualifier Jared Donaldson and 21st seed Feliciano López. He lost his chance to compete in the round of 16 when he was beaten by 14th seed Dominic Thiem.

In June, Nishioka won through qualifying at Wimbledon for the first time, losing to Sergiy Stakhovsky in the first round of the main draw. The following week, he earned his third Challenger title in Winnetka without dropping a set, beating Frances Tiafoe in the final. He also moved into the top 100 of the ATP rankings for the first time. At the Atlanta Tennis Championships, he reached his first ATP tournament semi-final, after defeating Daniel Evans, fourth seed Alexandr Dolgopolov and Horacio Zeballos. He then lost to eventual champion Nick Kyrgios in three sets.

=== 2017: Indian Wells fourth round, knee injury ===
At the Australian Open, Nishioka earned his second win at a Grand Slam tournament when he defeated Alex Bolt. In the second round, he was ousted by Roberto Bautista Agut in straight sets. In February, he qualified for the Mexican Open by defeating Tobias Kamke and Ryan Harrison. He proceeded to the quarterfinals after wins against Jack Sock and Jordan Thompson. His victory against Sock was his first win over a top-20 opponent on the ATP Tour. He was then defeated by Rafael Nadal in straight sets.

In March, Nishioka built on his momentum by entering the main draw at Indian Wells as a lucky loser and reaching the fourth round, where he lost to world No. 3 Stan Wawrinka in three sets. Nishioka's promising start to the season was abruptly cut short when he ruptured the ACL of his left knee in a match against Jack Sock at the Miami Open. He underwent surgical reconstruction of the ACL on April 4, 2017.

=== 2018: Return from injury, first ATP title ===
After rehabilitating his knee, Nishioka returned to the ATP tour in January 2018. He chose to use his protected ranking (no. 66) to receive direct entry into the Australian Open draw. In the first round of the Australian Open, his first major match since his injury, he defeated No. 28 seed Philipp Kohlschreiber in five sets. At the Shenzhen Open, he won the first ATP World Tour title in his career, defeating Pierre-Hugues Herbert in the final.

=== 2019: Masters quarterfinal, first top-10 win ===
Nishioka defeated American Tennys Sandgren in the first round of the Australian Open. He fell to Karen Khachanov in the second round.

In the French Open, Nishioka defeated American Mackenzie McDonald in the first round. He fell to Juan Martín del Potro in a nearly four-hour-long five-set match in the second round.

At the Western & Southern Open, Nishioka had his first win against a top-ten player, defeating Kei Nishikori, whom Nishioka described as his hero, in the second round. Nishioka advanced to the quarter-finals of the tournament but had to withdraw due to illness.

=== 2020–2021: Australian Open third round, top 50 ===
At the Australian Open, Nishioka reached the third round of a Grand Slam tournament for the first time in his career, defeating 30th seed Dan Evans

Nishioka reached his second ATP final in Delray Beach, where he lost to Reilly Opelka in three sets. As a result, he reached the top 50 at world No. 48 on 24 February 2020.

At the 2020 US Open, Nishioka lost in the first round to former champion Andy Murray in a come-from-behind victory for the Scotsman in five sets.

Nishioka reached the quarterfinals in Lyon, where he to Stefanos Tsitsipas in straight sets.

=== 2022: Korea title, ATP 500 final, Asian No. 1 ===
Nishioka started his 2022 season at the Adelaide International 1. He lost in the first round to eighth seed Kwon Soon-woo. Getting past qualifying at the Adelaide International 2, he was defeated in the first round by lucky loser Thiago Monteiro. At the Australian Open, he lost in the first round to qualifier Radu Albot in four sets.

After the Australian Open, Nishioka played at the Columbus Challenger. Seeded third, he won his 11th ATP challenger title by beating Dominic Stricker in the final. Seeded third at the Cleveland Open, he reached the final; however, he was defeated by Dominic Stricker. At the first edition of the Dallas Open, he was eliminated in the second round by fifth seed Adrian Mannarino. In Delray Beach, he was beaten in the first round by Oscar Otte. Making it past qualifying at the Abierto Mexicano Telcel in Acapulco, he upset seventh seed, world No. 16, and 2020 finalist, Taylor Fritz, in the second round. He lost in the quarterfinals to top seed and world No. 2 Daniil Medvedev. At the Indian Wells Masters, he fell in the final round of qualifying to Mikhail Kukushkin. Getting past qualifying at the Miami Open, he defeated 24th seed and world No. 27, Dan Evans, in the second round to reach the third round as a qualifier for only the second time in his career at this Masters event. He lost in the third round to Lloyd Harris.

Nishioka started his clay court season at the BMW Open in Munich. Getting past qualifying, he lost in the first round to Emil Ruusuvuori. In Madrid, he was defeated in the first round of qualifying by Lorenzo Musetti. At the French Open, he lost in the first round to world No. 1 Novak Djokovic. At Wimbledon, Nishioka lost in the first round to Emil Ruusuvuori in four sets.

Ranked No. 96 at the Citi Open, he reached the quarterfinals, defeating Jenson Brooksby as well as 11th seed Alex de Minaur and 7th seed Karen Khachanov in straight sets. He defeated 16th seed Dan Evans in three sets to reach the semifinals of an ATP 500 event for the first time in his career. He went one step further to reach the biggest final of his career, defeating world No. 8 and top seed Andrey Rublev in straight sets, his third top-10 win in his career. He lost in the final to Nick Kyrgios. As a result, he moved up more than 40 positions back into the top 60 and became the No. 1 Japanese player.

At the 2022 Korea Open, he defeated fifth seed Dan Evans in the first round for the sixth time overall and the third time that season. Next he defeated compatriot Taro Daniel and top seed and world No. 2 Casper Ruud to reach the semifinals for only his second top-5 win of his career. He defeated lucky loser Aleksandar Kovacevic to reach the final. He then won his second title, defeating fourth seed Denis Shapovalov in the final in straight sets. As a result, he reached a new career-high of No. 41 on 3 October 2022. He became the first player from his nation to win a tour-level title since Kei Nishikori won Brisbane in 2019. At his home tournament, the Japan Open, he lost in the first round to Miomir Kecmanović.

At the Paris Masters he lost to World No. 1 Carlos Alcaraz in straight sets. Despite the loss he reached a new career-high ranking of No. 36 on 7 November 2022, becoming the No. 1 Asian player, one position ahead of Alexander Bublik.

=== 2023: Australian & French Open 4th rounds, top 25 ===
Nishioka started his 2023 season at the Adelaide International 1. He upset fifth seed and world No. 11, Holger Rune, in the first round in three sets. He reached the semifinals, where he retired during the second set against Sebastian Korda due to a leg injury. Seeded 31st at the Australian Open, he reached the fourth round for the first time at a Grand Slam tournament, recording his 100th career match win over Mackenzie McDonald, before losing to 18th seed and world No. 20 Karen Khachanov. As a result, he reached a career-high singles ranking of No. 32 on 20 February 2023.

After the Australian Open, Nishioka represented Japan in the Davis Cup tie against Poland. He played one match and beat Daniel Michalski. In the end, Japan won the tie over Poland 4–0. Seeded fifth at the Delray Beach Open, he defeated Oscar Otte before losing in the second round to Mackenzie McDonald. At the Abierto Mexicano Telcel in Acapulco, he lost in the first round to sixth seed and world No. 15 Frances Tiafoe. Seeded 29th at the BNP Paribas Open, he fell in his second-round match to qualifier Cristian Garín. Seeded 28th at the Miami Open, he lost in the second round to Alex Molčan.

Nishioka started his clay court season at the Barcelona Open. Seeded 16th, he reached the third round defeating David Goffin before losing to fourth seed and world No. 8, Jannik Sinner, in three sets. Seeded 28th in Madrid, he defeated Alex Molčan before getting eliminated from the tournament in the third round by fifth seed and world No. 6 Andrey Rublev. As the top seed at the Challenger 175, the Sardegna Open, he lost in the second round to Daniel Elahi Galán. In Rome he lost to Lorenzo Sonego, also in the second round. In June at the French Open, he defeated qualifier Thiago Seyboth Wild, the conqueror of world No. 2 Daniil Medvedev, in five sets to advance to his second consecutive Grand Slam fourth round. He became just the second Japanese player after Kei Nishikori to reach the last 16 of the tournament since the start of the Open Era in 1968. He lost to Tomás Martín Etcheverry in straight sets. As a result, he reached the top 30 in the rankings on 12 June 2023 and the top 25 a week later. Due to a groin injury sustained during his match against Etcheverry, Nishioka did not compete again until Wimbledon, where he lost in the first round to Daniel Galán.

He reached his fifth final and first of the season at the Zhuhai Championships but lost to top seed Karen Khachanov.

=== 2024: Third ATP title, back to top 50 ===
In July, Nishioka won his third title at the Atlanta Open, defeating Jordan Thompson and becoming the final champion at the tournament.

At the Japan Open where he entered the main draw as a wildcard, he upset Félix Auger-Aliassime while saving two match points, reaching the second round for only the second time at his home tournament. Nishioka lost his next match to sixth seed Holger Rune.

== Performance timelines ==
Key
W	F	SF	QF	#R	RR	Q#	P#	DNQ	A	Z#	PO	G	S	B	NMS	NTI	P	NH

(W) winner; (F) finalist; (SF) semifinalist; (QF) quarterfinalist; (#R) rounds 4, 3, 2, 1; (RR) round-robin stage; (Q#) qualification round; (P#) preliminary round; (DNQ) did not qualify; (A) absent; (Z#) Davis/Fed Cup Zonal Group (with number indication) or (PO) play-off; (G) gold, (S) silver or (B) bronze Olympic/Paralympic medal; (NMS) not a Masters tournament; (NTI) not a Tier I tournament; (P) postponed; (NH) not held; (SR) strike rate (events won / competed); (W–L) win–loss record.
To avoid confusion and double counting, these charts are updated at the conclusion of a tournament or when the player's participation has ended.

=== Singles ===
Current through the 2025 French Open.

Tournament	2013	2014	2015	2016	2017	2018	2019	2020	2021	2022	2023	2024	2025	2026	SR	W–L
Grand Slam tournaments
Australian Open	A	A	Q2	1R	2R	2R	2R	3R	1R	1R	4R	1R	2R	Q2	0 / 10	9–10
French Open	A	A	1R	Q3	A	1R	2R	2R	2R	1R	4R	1R	1R	1R	0 / 10	6–10
Wimbledon	A	A	Q2	1R	A	1R	1R	NH	2R	1R	1R	2R	1R	A	0 / 8	2–8
US Open	A	1R	2R	1R	A	1R	2R	1R	1R	1R	1R	1R	1R	A	0 / 11	2–11
Win–loss	0–0	0–1	1–2	0–3	1–1	1–4	3–4	3–3	2–4	0–4	6–4	1–4	1–4	0–1	0 / 39	19–39
ATP Masters 1000
Indian Wells Masters	A	A	Q1	A	4R	1R	4R	NH	2R	Q2	2R	Q1	A	A	0 / 5	7–5
Miami Open	Q1	A	Q1	3R	2R	2R	A	NH	1R	3R	2R	1R	1R	A	0 / 8	6–8
Monte Carlo Masters	A	A	A	A	A	A	Q1	NH	A	A	A	A	A		0 / 0	0–0
Madrid Open	A	A	A	A	A	A	A	NH	2R	Q1	3R	1R	A		0 / 3	2–3
Italian Open	A	A	A	A	A	A	1R	2R	1R	Q1	2R	2R	1R		0 / 6	2–6
Canadian Open	A	A	A	A	A	1R	Q2	NH	1R	2R	1R	Q1	1R		0 / 5	1–5
Cincinnati Masters	A	A	A	A	A	A	QF	A	1R	A	2R	2R	1R		0 / 5	5–4
Shanghai Masters	A	A	Q1	A	A	A	Q2	NH			2R	2R	3R		0 / 3	4–3
Paris Masters	A	A	A	A	A	A	1R	2R	Q2	2R	2R	A	A		0 / 4	3–4
Win–loss	0–0	0–0	0–0	2–1	4–2	1–3	6–4	2–2	2–6	4–3	4–8	2–5	2-5		0 / 39	29–38
National representation
Davis Cup	A	A	PO	1R	1R	PO	RR	A		A	WG1	WG1			0 / 3	10–4
Summer Olympics	NH			A	NH				1R	NH		A	NH		0 / 1	0–1
Career statistics
	2013	2014	2015	2016	2017	2018	2019	2020	2021	2022	2023	2024	2025	2026	Career	
Tournaments	0	1	5	12	9	11	20	12	23	17	21	18	1		149	
Titles	0	0	0	0	0	1	0	0	0	1	0	1	0		3	
Finals	0	0	0	0	0	1	0	1	0	2	1	1	0		6	
Overall win–loss	0–0	0–1	3–5	10–12	9–9	10–11	19–20	14–12	10–23	19–17	21–21	19–15	1–1		135–147	
Year-end ranking	442	166	117	100	166	75	73	56	80	36	47				48%	

== ATP Tour finals ==
=== Singles: 6 (3 titles, 3 runner-ups) ===
Legend Grand Slam (0–0) ATP Masters 1000 (0–0) ATP 500 (0–1) ATP 250 (3–2)	Finals by surface Hard (3–3) Clay (0–0) Grass (0–0)	Finals by setting Outdoor (3–3) Indoor (0–0)

Result	W–L	Date	Tournament	Tier	Surface	Opponent	Score
Win	1–0	Sep 2018	ATP Shenzhen Open, China	ATP 250	Hard	(France) Pierre-Hugues Herbert	7–5, 2–6, 6–4
Loss	1–1	Feb 2020	Delray Beach Open, United States	ATP 250	Hard	(United States) Reilly Opelka	5–7, 7–6^{(7–4)}, 2–6
Loss	1–2	Aug 2022	Washington Open, United States	ATP 500	Hard	(Australia) Nick Kyrgios	4–6, 3–6
Win	2–2	Sep 2022	Korea Open, South Korea	ATP 250	Hard	(Canada) Denis Shapovalov	6–4, 7–6^{(7–5)}
Loss	2–3	Sep 2023	Zhuhai Championships, China	ATP 250	Hard	Karen Khachanov	6–7^{(2–7)}, 1–6
Win	3–3	Jul 2024	Atlanta Open, United States	ATP 250	Hard	(Australia) Jordan Thompson	4–6, 7–6^{(7–2)}, 6–2

== ATP Challenger Tour finals ==
=== Singles: 8 (6 titles, 2 runner-ups) ===
Legend ATP Challenger Tour (7–2)	Finals by surface Hard (6–2) Carpet (1–0)

Result	W–L	Date	Tournament	Tier	Surface	Opponent	Score
Win	1–0	Sep 2014	Shanghai, China	Challenger	Hard	(India) Somdev Devvarman	6–4, 6–7^{(5–7)}, 7–6^{(7–3)}
Win	2–0	Nov 2015	Toyota, Japan	Challenger	Carpet (i)	(Russia) Alexander Kudryavtsev	6–3, 6–4
Win	3–0	Jul 2016	Winnetka, USA	Challenger	Hard	(United States) Frances Tiafoe	6–3, 6–2
Win	4–0	Nov 2016	Astana, Kazakhstan	Challenger	Hard (i)	(Uzbekistan) Denis Istomin	6–4, 6–7^{(4–7)}, 7–6^{(7–3)}
Win	5–0	May 2018	Gimcheon, South Korea	Challenger	Hard	(Canada) Vasek Pospisil	6–4, 7–5
Loss	5–1	Oct 2018	Traralgon, Australia	Challenger	Hard	(Australia) Jordan Thompson	3–6, 4–6
Win	6–1	Jan 2022	Columbus, USA	Challenger	Hard (i)	(Switzerland) Dominic Stricker	6–2, 6–4
Loss	6–2	Jan 2022	Cleveland, USA	Challenger	Hard (i)	(Switzerland) Dominic Stricker	5–7, 1–6
Win	7–2	Oct 2025	Suzhou, China	Challenger	Hard	(France) Harold Mayot	6–4, 6–4

=== Doubles: 1 (1 runner-up) ===
Legend ATP Challenger Tour (0–1)

Result	W–L	Date	Tournament	Surface	Partner	Opponents	Score
Loss	0–1	Feb 2016	Cherbourg, France	Hard (i)	(Bosnia and Herzegovina) Aldin Šetkić	(United Kingdom) Ken Skupski (United Kingdom) Neal Skupski	6–4, 3–6, [6–10]

== ITF Futures finals ==
=== Singles: 9 (5 titles, 4 runner-ups) ===
Legend ITF Futures (5–4)	Finals by surface Hard (1–1) Clay (4–3)

Result	W–L	Date	Tournament	Tier	Surface	Opponent	Score
Loss	0–1	Oct 2011	USA F28, Birmingham	Futures	Clay	(Australia) Jason Kubler	3–6, 2–6
Loss	0–2	Sep 2012	Mexico F11, Manzanillo	Futures	Hard	(Barbados) Darian King	0–6, 1–6
Win	1–2	Feb 2013	Mexico F3, Mexico City	Futures	Hard	(El Salvador) Marcelo Arévalo	6–2, 7–6^{(7–4)}
Win	2–2	Dec 2013	Chile F11, Quillota	Futures	Clay	(Argentina) Andrés Molteni	7–5, 6–2
Win	3–2	Dec 2013	Chile F12, San Felipe	Futures	Clay	(Chile) Jorge Aguilar	6–4, 6–2
Loss	3–3	Jan 2014	USA F1, Plantation	Futures	Clay	(United States) Sekou Bangoura	4–6, 2–6
Loss	3–4	Jan 2014	USA F2, Sunrise	Futures	Clay	(United Kingdom) Kyle Edmund	0–6, 3–6
Win	4–4	Feb 2014	USA F5, Sunrise	Futures	Clay	(Brazil) Tiago Lopes	6–2, 6–3
Win	5–4	Jun 2014	Japan F8, Sapporo	Futures	Clay	(Japan) Yasutaka Uchiyama	6–4, 6–3

== Wins over top 10 players ==
- He has a 4–21 record against players who were, at the time the match was played, ranked in the top 10.

Season	2019	2020	2021	2022	2023	Total
Wins	2	0	0	2	0	4

#	Player	Rk	Event	Surface	Rd	Score	Rk	Ref
2019
1.	(Japan) Kei Nishikori	5	Cincinnati Open, US	Hard	2R	7–6^{(7–2)}, 6–4	77	
2.	(France) Gaël Monfils	10	Davis Cup Finals, Spain	Hard (i)	–	7–5, 6–2	73	
2022
3.	Andrey Rublev	8	Washington, D.C., US	Hard	SF	6–3, 6–4	96	
4.	(Norway) Casper Ruud	2	Seoul, South Korea	Hard	QF	6–2, 3–6, 6–2	56	
