= Atlanta Open (tennis) =

Defunct tennis tournament
- Founded: 2010
- Location: Atlanta, Georgia; United States
- Venue: Atlantic Station (2012–2024)
- Category: ATP Tour 250 (2010–2024)
- Surface: Hard / outdoor
- Draw: 28S/32Q/16D
- Prize money: $756,020 (2024)
- Website: atlantaopentennis.com

Current champions (2024)
- Singles: (Japan) Yoshihito Nishioka
- Doubles: (United States) Nathaniel Lammons (United States) Jackson Withrow

The Atlanta Open was a professional men's tennis tournament that was played in the Atlanta area in the United States from 2010 to 2024, usually during July or August. The tournament was played on outdoor hard courts as part of the USTA's US Open Series, the seven-week summer season lead-up to the U.S. Open. The Atlanta Open was known as the Atlanta Tennis Championships for its first two years before signing BB&T as a title sponsor in 2012. In 2015, the tournament was acquired by GF Sports from its then-owners, the USTA.

The event was removed from the 2025 calendar.

== History ==
In 2009, the Association of Tennis Professionals purchased the license for the tournament held in Indianapolis for many decades because changes in scheduling the event caused a struggle to attract top players followed by low ticket sales. In December 2009 it was announced that the ATP had sold the license to a group in Atlanta, Georgia, where it would be held at the Atlanta Athletic Club. Prior to 2010 Atlanta had previously held a tennis tournament known as the Verizon Tennis Challenge from 1992 to 2001. That tournament, also held at the Atlanta Athletic Club, included Andy Roddick, Pete Sampras, Andre Agassi and John McEnroe among its past champions.

In 2011 the tournament moved to the Racquet Club of the South in suburban Atlanta. In 2012, the tournament gained BB&T as title sponsor and changed its name to the BB&T Atlanta Open. The 2012 and later editions have been held in Atlantic Station in midtown Atlanta. Temporary courts are constructed around the retail and residential area's central park. The main court has a capacity of 4,000 people. In 2015, the tournament was acquired from the USTA by GF Sports.

For its first six years, the Atlanta Open singles was dominated by Americans. Mardy Fish, Andy Roddick, and John Isner were the only men to win the event before Australian Nick Kyrgios defeated Isner in the 2016 final. Isner, a former Georgia Bulldog and local favorite, owns the tournament records for most finals (9) and most titles (6).

Eddie Gonzalez served as Atlanta Open Tournament Director from 2014-2022.

== Finals ==
=== Singles ===
Year	Champions	Runners-up	Score
2010	(United States) Mardy Fish	(United States) John Isner	4–6, 6–4, 7–6^{(7–4)}
2011	(United States) Mardy Fish (2)	(United States) John Isner	3–6, 7–6^{(8–6)}, 6–2
2012	(United States) Andy Roddick	(Luxembourg) Gilles Müller	1–6, 7–6^{(7–2)}, 6–2
2013	(United States) John Isner	(South Africa) Kevin Anderson	6–7^{(3–7)}, 7–6^{(7–2)}, 7–6^{(7–2)}
2014	(United States) John Isner (2)	(Israel) Dudi Sela	6–3, 6–4
2015	(United States) John Isner (3)	(Cyprus) Marcos Baghdatis	6–3, 6–3
2016	(Australia) Nick Kyrgios	(United States) John Isner	7–6^{(7–3)}, 7–6^{(7–4)}
2017	(United States) John Isner (4)	(United States) Ryan Harrison	7–6^{(8–6)}, 7–6^{(9–7)}
2018	(United States) John Isner (5)	(United States) Ryan Harrison	5–7, 6–3, 6–4
2019	(Australia) Alex de Minaur	(United States) Taylor Fritz	6–3, 7–6^{(7–2)}
2020	Not held due to COVID-19 pandemic		
2021	(United States) John Isner (6)	(United States) Brandon Nakashima	7–6^{(10–8)}, 7–5
2022	(Australia) Alex de Minaur (2)	(United States) Jenson Brooksby	6–3, 6–3
2023	(United States) Taylor Fritz	(Australia) Aleksandar Vukic	7–5, 6–7^{(5–7)}, 6–4
2024	(Japan) Yoshihito Nishioka	(Australia) Jordan Thompson	4–6, 7–6^{(7–2)}, 6–2

=== Doubles ===
Year	Champions	Runners-up	Score
2010	(United States) Scott Lipsky (United States) Rajeev Ram	(India) Rohan Bopanna (Belgium) Kristof Vliegen	6–3, 6–7^{(4–7)}, [12–10]
2011	(United States) Alex Bogomolov, Jr. (Australia) Matthew Ebden	(Germany) Matthias Bachinger (Germany) Frank Moser	3–6, 7–5, [10–8]
2012	(Australia) Matthew Ebden (United States) Ryan Harrison	(Belgium) Xavier Malisse (United States) Michael Russell	6–3, 3–6, [10–6]
2013	(France) Édouard Roger-Vasselin (Netherlands) Igor Sijsling	(United Kingdom) Colin Fleming (United Kingdom) Jonathan Marray	7–6^{(8–6)}, 6–3
2014	(Canada) Vasek Pospisil (United States) Jack Sock	(United States) Steve Johnson (United States) Sam Querrey	6–3, 5–7, [10–5]
2015	(United States) Bob Bryan (United States) Mike Bryan	(United Kingdom) Colin Fleming (Luxembourg) Gilles Müller	4–6, 7–6^{(7–2)}, [10–4]
2016	(Argentina) Andrés Molteni (Argentina) Horacio Zeballos	(Sweden) Johan Brunström (Sweden) Andreas Siljeström	7–6^{(7–2)}, 6–4
2017	(United States) Bob Bryan (United States) Mike Bryan	(Netherlands) Wesley Koolhof (New Zealand) Artem Sitak	6–3, 6–4
2018	(United States) Nicholas Monroe (Australia) John-Patrick Smith	(United States) Rajeev Ram (United States) Ryan Harrison	3–6, 7–6^{(7–5)}, [10–8]
2019	(United Kingdom) Dominic Inglot (United States) Austin Krajicek	(United States) Bob Bryan (United States) Mike Bryan	6–4, 6–7^{(5–7)}, [11–9]
2020	Not held due to COVID-19 pandemic		
2021	(United States) Reilly Opelka (Italy) Jannik Sinner	(United States) Steve Johnson (Australia) Jordan Thompson	6–4, 6–7^{(6–8)}, [10–3]
2022	(Australia) Thanasi Kokkinakis (Australia) Nick Kyrgios	(Australia) Jason Kubler (Australia) John Peers	7–6^{(7–4)}, 7–5
2023	(United States) Nathaniel Lammons (United States) Jackson Withrow	(Australia) Max Purcell (Australia) Jordan Thompson	7–6^{(7–3)}, 7–6^{(7–4)}
2024	(United States) Nathaniel Lammons (United States) Jackson Withrow	(Sweden) André Göransson (Netherlands) Sem Verbeek	4–6, 6–4, [12–10]

== Records ==
Here are the singles and doubles records that were achieved during the 14 editions of the Atlanta tournament.

Record	Player(s)	Count	Years
Winner of most Men's Singles titles	(United States) John Isner	6	2013, 2014, 2015, 2017, 2018, 2021
Winner of most consecutive Men's Singles titles	(United States) John Isner	3	2013, 2014, 2015
Most Men's Singles finals	(United States) John Isner	9	2010, 2011, 2013, 2014, 2015, 2016, 2017, 2018, 2021
Most consecutive Men's Singles finals	(United States) John Isner	6	2013, 2014, 2015, 2016, 2017, 2018
Most Matches Played	(United States) John Isner	44	2010–2023
Most Matches Won	(United States) John Isner	37	2010–2023
Most Matches Won %	(United States) John Isner	84.09%	2010–2023
Most Appearances	(United States) John Isner	13	2010–2023
Winner of most Men's Doubles titles (individual)	(United States) Bob Bryan (United States) Mike Bryan (Australia) Matthew Ebden (United States) Nathaniel Lammons (United States) Jackson Withrow	2	2015, 2017; 2015, 2017; 2011, 2012; 2023, 2024; 2023, 2024
Winner of most consecutive Men's Doubles titles (individual)	(Australia) Matthew Ebden (United States) Nathaniel Lammons (United States) Jackson Withrow	2	2011, 2012; 2023, 2024; 2023, 2024

== See also ==
- WCT Atlanta Championships – men's tournament
- WTA Atlanta – women's tournament
- List of tennis tournaments

Awards and achievements
Preceded by None	ATP International Series Gold Tournament of the Year; 2001	Succeeded by Kitzbühel
Preceded by None	ATP International Series Tournament of the Year; 1990–1997	Succeeded by Miami
