= 2022 Atlanta Open =

- Date: July 23–31
- Edition: 34th
- Surface: Hard
- Location: Atlanta, United States
- Venue: Atlantic Station

Champions

Singles
- (Australia) Alex de Minaur

Doubles
- (Australia) Thanasi Kokkinakis / (Australia) Nick Kyrgios
- Atlanta Open

The 2022 Atlanta Open was a men's professional tennis tournament played on hard courts. It was the 34th edition of the tournament, and part of the 2022 ATP Tour. It took place at Atlantic Station in Atlanta, United States between July 24 and 31, 2022. Third-seeded Alex de Minaur won the singles title.

== Finals ==
=== Singles ===
- (Australia) Alex de Minaur defeated (United States) Jenson Brooksby, 6–3, 6–3

=== Doubles ===
- (Australia) Thanasi Kokkinakis / (Australia) Nick Kyrgios defeated (Australia) Jason Kubler / (Australia) John Peers, 7–6^{(7–4)}, 7–5

== Points and prize money ==
=== Point distribution ===
Event	W	F	SF	QF	Round of 16	Round of 32	Q	Q2	Q1
Singles	250	150	90	45	20	0	12	6	0
Doubles	250	150	90	45	0	—N/a	—N/a	—N/a	—N/a

=== Prize money ===
Event	W	F	SF	QF	Round of 16	Round of 32	Q2	Q1
Singles	$107,770	$62,865	$36,960	$21,415	$12,435	$7,600	$3,800	$2,070
Doubles	$37,440	$20,040	$11,740	$6,560	$3,870	—N/a	—N/a	—N/a
Doubles prize money per team

== Singles main-draw entrants ==
=== Seeds ===
Country	Player	Rank^{1}	Seed
~~USA~~	~~Reilly Opelka~~	~~17~~	~~1~~
USA	John Isner	22	2
AUS	Alex de Minaur	24	3
USA	Frances Tiafoe	29	4
USA	Tommy Paul	34	5
USA	Jenson Brooksby	41	6
~~AUS~~	~~Nick Kyrgios~~	~~45~~	~~7~~
USA	Brandon Nakashima	49	8

- ^{1} Rankings are as of July 18, 2022.

=== Other entrants ===
The following players received wildcards into the main draw:

- (United States) Andres Martin
- (United States) Ben Shelton
- (United States) Jack Sock

The following players received entry from the qualifying draw:

- (Japan) Taro Daniel
- (Germany) Peter Gojowczyk
- (Germany) Dominik Koepfer
- (India) Ramkumar Ramanathan

The following players received entry as lucky losers:

- (United States) Steve Johnson
- (France) Adrian Mannarino

=== Withdrawals ===
- (United States) Maxime Cressy → replaced by (Australia) John Millman
- (United States) Taylor Fritz → replaced by (Australia) Thanasi Kokkinakis
- (Serbia) Miomir Kecmanović → replaced by (United States) Denis Kudla
- (Australia) Nick Kyrgios → replaced by (France) Adrian Mannarino
- (United Kingdom) Andy Murray → replaced by (South Korea) Kwon Soon-woo
- (United Kingdom) Cameron Norrie → replaced by (Australia) Jordan Thompson
- (United States) Reilly Opelka → replaced by (United States) Steve Johnson

== Doubles main-draw entrants ==
=== Seeds ===
Country	Player	Country	Player	Rank^{1}	Seed
CRO	Ivan Dodig	USA	Austin Krajicek	34	1
AUS	Thanasi Kokkinakis	AUS	Nick Kyrgios	54	2
USA	Rajeev Ram	USA	Jack Sock	60	3
AUS	Matthew Ebden	AUS	Max Purcell	66	4

- ^{1} Rankings are as of July 18, 2022.

=== Other entrants ===
The following pairs received wildcards into the doubles main draw:

- (Colombia) Andrei Duarte / (Spain) Álvaro Regalado Pedrol
- (United States) Christopher Eubanks / (United States) Mackenzie McDonald

The following pair received entry as alternates:

- (France) Quentin Halys / (France) Adrian Mannarino

=== Withdrawals ===
- (Uruguay) Ariel Behar / (Ecuador) Gonzalo Escobar → replaced by (Ecuador) Gonzalo Escobar / (United States) Hunter Reese
- (United States) Maxime Cressy / (United States) Mackenzie McDonald → replaced by (France) Quentin Halys / (France) Adrian Mannarino
- (Australia) John Peers / (Slovakia) Filip Polášek → replaced by (Australia) Jason Kubler / (Australia) John Peers
- (Chile) Julio Peralta / (India) Ramkumar Ramanathan → replaced by (Mexico) Hans Hach Verdugo / (India) Ramkumar Ramanathan
