= 2026 U.S. Men's Clay Court Championships – Singles =

Singles
- 2026 U.S. Men's Clay Court Championships

Final
- Champion: (United States) Tommy Paul
- Runner-up: (Argentina) Román Andrés Burruchaga
- Score: 6–1, 3–6, 7–5

Details
- Draw: 28 (4 Q / 3 WC)
- Seeds: 8

Events
Singles	Doubles
- U.S. Men's Clay Court Championships

Tommy Paul defeated Román Andrés Burruchaga in the final, 6–1, 3–6, 7–5 to win the singles tennis title at the 2026 U.S. Men's Clay Court Championships. He saved three championship points en route to his first ATP Tour title on clay, and fifth overall.

Jenson Brooksby was the defending champion, but lost in the first round to Mackenzie McDonald.

== Seeds ==
The top four seeds received a bye into the second round.

1. (United States) Ben Shelton (quarterfinals)
2. (United States) Frances Tiafoe (semifinals)
3. (United States) Learner Tien (quarterfinals)
4. (United States) Tommy Paul (champion)
5. (United States) Brandon Nakashima (second round)
6. (Argentina) Tomás Martín Etcheverry (quarterfinals)
7. (United States) Alex Michelsen (second round)
8. (United States) Jenson Brooksby (first round)

== Draw ==
Key

- Q = Qualifier
- WC = Wild card
- LL = Lucky loser
- Alt = Alternate
- ITF = ITF entry
- PR = Protected ranking
- SR = Special ranking
- SE = Special exempt
- JE = Junior exempt
- JR = Junior Accelerator Programme entrant
- CO = College Accelerator Programme entrant
- NG = Next Gen Accelerator Program entrant
- w/o = Walkover
- r = Retired
- d = Defaulted

=== Finals ===
Semifinals
(Argentina) Thiago Agustín Tirante	1	1
(Argentina) Román Andrés Burruchaga	6	6
4	(United States) Tommy Paul	7	4	7^{9}
2	(United States) Frances Tiafoe	5	6	6^{7}

Final
(Argentina) Román Andrés Burruchaga	1	6	5
4	(United States) Tommy Paul	6	3	7

=== Top half ===
First round
Q	(United Kingdom) J Pinnington Jones	1	3
WC	(China) Z Zhang	6	6
WC	(United States) C Smith	0	3
(Argentina) TA Tirante	6	6
(United States) M McDonald	6	6
8	(United States) J Brooksby	4	2
WC	(United States) N Basavareddy	6	2	6
Q	(Canada) L Draxl	3	6	4
(Argentina) RA Burruchaga	6	6
(Australia) A Walton	2	3
(United States) M Damm	6^{0}	2
5	(United States) B Nakashima	7^{7}	6

Second round
1	(United States) B Shelton	7^{7}	7^{7}
WC	(China) Z Zhang	6^{5}	6^{3}
(Argentina) TA Tirante	6	6
(United States) M McDonald	2	0
3	(United States) L Tien	6	3	6
WC	(United States) N Basavareddy	3	6	1
(Argentina) RA Burruchaga	6	2	6
5	(United States) B Nakashima	4	6	4

Quarterfinals
1	(United States) B Shelton	7^{7}	3	4
(Argentina) TA Tirante	6^{5}	6	6
3	(United States) L Tien	5	4
(Argentina) RA Burruchaga	7	6

Semifinals
(Argentina) TA Tirante	1	1
(Argentina) RA Burruchaga	6	6

=== Bottom half ===
First round
6	(Argentina) TM Etcheverry	1	6	6
Q	(Argentina) FA Gómez	6	1	4
Q	(Australia) A Bolt	7^{8}	6
(China) Y Wu	6^{6}	2
(Paraguay) AD Vallejo	6	6
(United States) Z Svajda	1	4
7	(United States) A Michelsen	6	6
(Hong Kong) C Wong	4	2
(Australia) A Popyrin	4	6	6
(United States) P Kypson	6	4	3
(United States) A Kovacevic	4	2
(Australia) R Hijikata	6	6

Second round
6	(Argentina) TM Etcheverry	6^{5}	6	6
Q	(Australia) A Bolt	7^{7}	0	3
(Paraguay) AD Vallejo	6	4	4
4	(United States) T Paul	3	6	6
7	(United States) A Michelsen	0	6	1
(Australia) A Popyrin	6	4	6
(Australia) R Hijikata	4	6	2
2	(United States) F Tiafoe	6	3	6

Quarterfinals
6	(Argentina) TM Etcheverry	4	2
4	(United States) T Paul	6	6
(Australia) A Popyrin	6	4	6^{6}
2	(United States) F Tiafoe	3	6	7^{8}

Semifinals
4	(United States) T Paul	7	4	7^{9}
2	(United States) F Tiafoe	5	6	6^{7}

== Qualifying ==
=== Seeds ===
1. (United Kingdom) Jack Pinnington Jones (qualified)
2. (Canada) Liam Draxl (qualified)
3. (Australia) Alex Bolt (qualified)
4. (Argentina) Federico Agustín Gómez (qualified)
5. (France) Clément Tabur (qualifying competition)
6. (Argentina) Genaro Alberto Olivieri (first round)
7. (Canada) Alexis Galarneau (qualifying competition)
8. (Ecuador) Andrés Andrade (qualifying competition)

=== Qualifiers ===
1. (United Kingdom) Jack Pinnington Jones
2. (Canada) Liam Draxl
3. (Australia) Alex Bolt
4. (Argentina) Federico Agustín Gómez

=== Qualifying draw ===
==== First qualifier ====
First round
1	(United Kingdom) Jack Pinnington Jones	6	6
WC	(United States) J. J. Wolf	4	4
WC	(United States) Darwin Blanch	6	5	7^{7}
6	(Argentina) Genaro Alberto Olivieri	0	7	6^{5}

Qualifying competition
1	(United Kingdom) Jack Pinnington Jones	6	7^{7}
WC	(United States) Darwin Blanch	4	6^{4}

==== Second qualifier ====
First round
2	(Canada) Liam Draxl	6	1	7^{7}
(United States) Mitchell Krueger	3	6	6^{2}
PR	(France) Gabriel Debru	2	3
7	(Canada) Alexis Galarneau	6	6

Qualifying competition
2	(Canada) Liam Draxl	3	6	7^{7}
7	(Canada) Alexis Galarneau	6	1	6^{2}

==== Third qualifier ====
First round
3	(Australia) Alex Bolt	5	6	6
Alt	(United States) Alex Rybakov	7	2	4
Alt	(United States) Stefan Dostanic	1	3
8	(Ecuador) Andrés Andrade	6	6

Qualifying competition
3	(Australia) Alex Bolt	6	4	6
8	(Ecuador) Andrés Andrade	2	6	2

==== Fourth qualifier ====
First round
4	(Argentina) Federico Agustín Gómez	6	6
(United States) Andres Martin	4	4
(Colombia) Daniel Elahi Galán	2	5
5	(France) Clément Tabur	6	7

Qualifying competition
4	(Argentina) Federico Agustín Gómez	0	7^{7}	6
5	(France) Clément Tabur	6	6^{4}	2
