= 2025 U.S. Men's Clay Court Championships =

- Date: March 31– April 6
- Edition: 55th
- Category: ATP Tour 250
- Draw: 28S/16D
- Surface: Clay
- Location: Houston, TX, United States
- Venue: River Oaks Country Club

Champions

Singles
- (United States) Jenson Brooksby

Doubles
- (Brazil) Fernando Romboli / (Australia) John-Patrick Smith
← 2024 ·	U.S. Men's Clay Court Championships	· 2026 →

The 2025 U.S. Men's Clay Court Championships (also known as the Fayez Sarofim & Co. U.S. Men's Clay Court Championships for sponsorship purposes) was a tennis tournament played on outdoor clay courts.

It was the 55th edition of the U.S. Men's Clay Court Championships, and an ATP Tour 250 event on the 2025 ATP Tour. It took place at River Oaks Country Club in Houston, Texas, United States from March 31 through April 6, 2025.

== Champions ==
=== Singles ===
- (United States) Jenson Brooksby def. (United States) Frances Tiafoe, 6–4, 6–2

=== Doubles ===
- (Brazil) Fernando Romboli / (Australia) John-Patrick Smith def. (Argentina) Federico Agustín Gómez / (Mexico) Santiago González 6–1, 6–4.

== Singles main draw entrants ==
=== Seeds ===
Country	Player	Rank^{1}	Seed
USA	Tommy Paul	13	1
USA	Frances Tiafoe	17	2
CHI	Alejandro Tabilo	31	3
USA	Brandon Nakashima	32	4
USA	Alex Michelsen	33	5
AUS	Jordan Thompson	37	6
ARG	Tomás Martín Etcheverry	44	7
JPN	Kei Nishikori	64	8

- Rankings are as of March 17, 2025.

=== Other entrants ===
The following players received wildcards into the main draw:

- (Chile) Cristian Garín
- (United States) Michael Mmoh
- (United States) Ethan Quinn

The following players received entry via the qualifying draw:

- (United States) Jenson Brooksby
- (France) Corentin Denolly
- (United States) Mitchell Krueger
- (United States) Colton Smith

The following player received entry as a lucky loser:

- (France) Adrian Mannarino

=== Withdrawals ===
- (United States) Marcos Giron → replaced by (Colombia) Daniel Elahi Galán
- (Brazil) Thiago Monteiro → replaced by (Japan) Taro Daniel
- (United States) Nicolas Moreno de Alboran → replaced by (France) Adrian Mannarino
- (China) Shang Juncheng → replaced by (United States) Mackenzie McDonald
- (China) Wu Yibing → replaced by (Germany) Yannick Hanfmann

== Doubles main draw entrants ==
=== Seeds ===
Country	Player	Country	Player	Rank^{1}	Seed
USA	Robert Galloway	USA	Jackson Withrow	54	1
USA	Christian Harrison	USA	Evan King	65	2
USA	Austin Krajicek	USA	Rajeev Ram	82	3
AUS	Rinky Hijikata	AUS	Jordan Thompson	123	4

- Rankings are as of March 17, 2025

=== Other entrants ===
The following pairs received wildcards into the doubles main draw:

- (United States) Jenson Brooksby / (United States) Learner Tien
- (United States) Michael Mmoh / (United States) Frances Tiafoe

=== Withdrawals ===
- (Mexico) Santiago González / (Netherlands) Jean-Julien Rojer → replaced by (Argentina) Federico Agustín Gómez / (Mexico) Santiago González
