= 2025 U.S. Men's Clay Court Championships – Singles =

Singles
- 2025 U.S. Men's Clay Court Championships

Final
- Champion: (United States) Jenson Brooksby
- Runner-up: (United States) Frances Tiafoe
- Score: 6–4, 6–2

Details
- Draw: 28 (4 Q / 3 WC)
- Seeds: 8

Events
Singles	Doubles
- U.S. Men's Clay Court Championships

Jenson Brooksby defeated Frances Tiafoe in the final, 6–4, 6–2 to win the singles tennis title at the 2025 U.S. Men's Clay Court Championships. It was his first ATP Tour title. He saved five match points across three separate matches en route to the title – one against Federico Agustín Gómez in the first qualifying round, three against Alejandro Tabilo in the second round, and one against Tommy Paul in the semifinals. Ranked as the world No. 507, Brooksby was the lowest-ranked quarterfinalist and beyond in the tournament's history, and the lowest-ranked ATP Tour finalist and champion on clay since 1990.

Ben Shelton was the reigning champion, but did not participate this year.

All eight quarterfinalists were Americans, marking the first time that all the quarterfinalists in an ATP Tour event were from the same country since the 1991 Prudential-Bache Securities Classic.

== Seeds ==
The top four seeds received a bye into the second round.

1. (United States) Tommy Paul (semifinals)
2. (United States) Frances Tiafoe (final)
3. (Chile) Alejandro Tabilo (second round)
4. (United States) Brandon Nakashima (semifinals)
5. (United States) Alex Michelsen (quarterfinals)
6. (Australia) Jordan Thompson (first round)
7. (Argentina) Tomás Martín Etcheverry (first round)
8. (Japan) Kei Nishikori (second round, retired)

== Draw ==
Key

- Q = Qualifier
- WC = Wild card
- LL = Lucky loser
- Alt = Alternate
- ITF = ITF entry
- PR = Protected ranking
- SR = Special ranking
- SE = Special exempt
- JE = Junior exempt
- JR = Junior Accelerator Programme entrant
- CO = College Accelerator Programme entrant
- NG = Next Gen Accelerator Program entrant
- w/o = Walkover
- r = Retired
- d = Defaulted

=== Finals ===
Semifinals
1	(United States) Tommy Paul	6^{5}	6	6^{6}
Q	(United States) Jenson Brooksby	7^{7}	3	7^{8}
4	(United States) Brandon Nakashima	4	6^{3}
2	(United States) Frances Tiafoe	6	7^{7}

Final
Q	(United States) Jenson Brooksby	6	6
2	(United States) Frances Tiafoe	4	2

=== Top half ===
First round
WC	(Chile) C Garín	6	6
(Switzerland) A Ritschard	3	4
Q	(United States) C Smith	6	6
(Australia) J Duckworth	2	2
WC	(United States) E Quinn	4	6	6
6	(Australia) J Thompson	6	4	3
(Japan) T Daniel	4	4
Q	(United States) J Brooksby	6	6
(United States) B Holt	6^{7}	6^{8}
Q	(France) C Denolly	7^{9}	7^{10}
(United States) A Kovacevic	6	6
7	(Argentina) TM Etcheverry	3	4

Second round
1	(United States) T Paul	2	6	7^{7}
WC	(Chile) C Garín	6	2	6^{5}
Q	(United States) C Smith	6	6
WC	(United States) E Quinn	3	4
3	(Chile) A Tabilo	6	4	6^{6}
Q	(United States) J Brooksby	3	6	7^{8}
Q	(France) C Denolly	3	3
(United States) A Kovacevic	6	6

Quarterfinals
1	(United States) T Paul	6	7^{7}
Q	(United States) C Smith	1	6^{1}
Q	(United States) J Brooksby	2	6	6
(United States) A Kovacevic	6	3	4

Semifinals
1	(United States) T Paul	6^{5}	6	6^{6}
Q	(United States) J Brooksby	7^{7}	3	7^{8}

=== Bottom half ===
First round
8	(Japan) K Nishikori	6	6
Q	(United States) M Krueger	4	2
(Australia) R Hijikata	2	6	3
(United States) C Eubanks	6	4	6
(Colombia) DE Galán	2	7^{7}	4
(United States) M McDonald	6	6^{3}	6
5	(United States) A Michelsen	6	6
(United States) L Tien	4	2
(Germany) Y Hanfmann	6^{5}	3
LL	(France) A Mannarino	7^{7}	6
WC	(United States) M Mmoh	3	6^{5}
(Australia) A Walton	6	7^{7}

Second round
8	(Japan) K Nishikori	1	0^{r}
(United States) C Eubanks	6	0
(United States) M McDonald	1	5
4	(United States) B Nakashima	6	7
5	(United States) A Michelsen	6^{0}	6	6
LL	(France) A Mannarino	7^{7}	4	2
(Australia) A Walton	5	3
2	(United States) F Tiafoe	7	6

Quarterfinals
(United States) C Eubanks	4	4
4	(United States) B Nakashima	6	6
5	(United States) A Michelsen	5	1
2	(United States) F Tiafoe	7	6

Semifinals
4	(United States) B Nakashima	4	6^{3}
2	(United States) F Tiafoe	6	7^{7}

== Qualifying ==
=== Seeds ===
1. (Argentina) Federico Agustín Gómez (first round)
2. (United States) Mitchell Krueger (qualified)
3. (France) Adrian Mannarino (qualifying competition, lucky loser)
4. (Canada) Liam Draxl (qualifying competition)
5. (Japan) James Trotter (first round)
6. (United States) Colton Smith (qualified)
7. (Ecuador) Andrés Andrade (first round, retired)
8. (Germany) Patrick Zahraj (qualifying competition, retired)

=== Qualifiers ===
1. (United States) Jenson Brooksby
2. (United States) Mitchell Krueger
3. (France) Corentin Denolly
4. (United States) Colton Smith

=== Lucky loser ===
1. (France) Adrian Mannarino

=== Qualifying draw ===
==== First qualifier ====
First round
1	(Argentina) Federico Agustín Gómez	6	6^{5}	4
WC	(United States) Jenson Brooksby	3	7^{7}	6
(United States) Patrick Maloney	6^{5}	5
7	(Ecuador) Andrés Andrade	7^{7}	3^{r}

Qualifying competition
WC	(United States) Jenson Brooksby	6	6
(United States) Patrick Maloney	4	2

==== Second qualifier ====
First round
2	(United States) Mitchell Krueger	5	3
(United States) Toby Kodat	7	1^{r}
Alt	(United States) Felix Corwin	4	5
8/Alt	(Germany) Patrick Zahraj	6	7

Qualifying competition
2	(United States) Mitchell Krueger	6^{5}	5
8/Alt	(Germany) Patrick Zahraj	7^{7}	3^{r}

==== Third qualifier ====
First round
3/Alt	(France) Adrian Mannarino	3	6	6
(Japan) Naoki Nakagawa	6	3	2
(France) Corentin Denolly	6	2	6
5	(Japan) James Trotter	3	6	3

Qualifying competition
3/Alt	(France) Adrian Mannarino	4	7	6^{5}
(France) Corentin Denolly	6	5	7^{7}

==== Fourth qualifier ====
First round
4	(Canada) Liam Draxl	6	6
Alt	(United States) William Grant	3	2
Alt	(United States) Evan Zhu	1	2
6/WC	(United States) Colton Smith	6	6

Qualifying competition
4	(Canada) Liam Draxl	4	4
6/WC	(United States) Colton Smith	6	6
