= 2024 U.S. Men's Clay Court Championships – Doubles =

Doubles
- 2024 U.S. Men's Clay Court Championships

Final
- Champions: (Australia) Max Purcell (Australia) Jordan Thompson
- Runners-up: (United States) William Blumberg (Australia) John Peers
- Score: 7–5, 6–1

Details
- Draw: 16
- Seeds: 4

Events
Singles	Doubles
← 2023 ·	U.S. Men's Clay Court Championships	· 2025 →

Defending champions Max Purcell and Jordan Thompson defeated William Blumberg and John Peers in the final, 7–5, 6–1 to win the doubles tennis title at the 2024 U.S. Men's Clay Court Championships. Purcell became the first player to win three consecutive doubles titles at the tournament since Bob Bryan and Mike Bryan from 2009 to 2011.

== Seeds ==
1. (United States) Austin Krajicek / (United States) Rajeev Ram (first round)
2. (United States) Nathaniel Lammons / (United States) Jackson Withrow (first round)
3. (United Kingdom) Julian Cash / (United States) Robert Galloway (first round)
4. (Australia) Max Purcell / (Australia) Jordan Thompson (champions)

== Draw ==
Key

- Q = Qualifier
- WC = Wild card
- LL = Lucky loser
- Alt = Alternate
- ITF = ITF entry
- PR = Protected ranking
- SR = Special ranking
- SE = Special exempt
- JE = Junior exempt
- JR = Junior Accelerator Programme entrant
- CO = College Accelerator Programme entrant
- NG = Next Gen Accelerator Program entrant
- w/o = Walkover
- r = Retired
- d = Defaulted

=== Draw ===
First round
1	(United States) A Krajicek (United States) R Ram	6	6^{5}	[6]
(India) S Balaji (Germany) A Begemann	3	7^{7}	[10]
(India) A Kadhe (India) J Nedunchezhiyan	6	6
PR	(New Zealand) M Daniell (Venezuela) LD Martínez	4	2
4	(Australia) M Purcell (Australia) J Thompson	6	6^{5}	[10]
(United States) E King (Australia) J-P Smith	4	7^{7}	[4]
WC	(United States) M Mmoh (United States) F Tiafoe	3	4
(India) A Chandrasekar (India) VS Prashanth	6	6
(United States) W Blumberg (Australia) J Peers	6	6
(Poland) P Matuszewski (Australia) MC Romios	0	3
WC	(Ecuador) A Andrade (United States) B Shelton	6^{5}	6	[10]
3	(United Kingdom) J Cash (United States) R Galloway	7^{7}	3	[5]
(Italy) L Darderi (Argentina) TM Etcheverry	3	5
(Brazil) F Romboli (Brazil) M Zormann	6	7
(Australia) A Harris (Australia) R Hijikata	6	6
2	(United States) N Lammons (United States) J Withrow	4	4

Quarterfinals
(India) S Balaji (Germany) A Begemann	6	6
(India) A Kadhe (India) J Nedunchezhiyan	0	3
4	(Australia) M Purcell (Australia) J Thompson	3	6	[10]
(India) A Chandrasekar (India) VS Prashanth	6	3	[5]
(United States) W Blumberg (Australia) J Peers	6	6
WC	(Ecuador) A Andrade (United States) B Shelton	2	1
(Brazil) F Romboli (Brazil) M Zormann	6	6
(Australia) A Harris (Australia) R Hijikata	1	4

Semifinals
(India) S Balaji (Germany) A Begemann	7^{7}	2	[3]
4	(Australia) M Purcell (Australia) J Thompson	6^{5}	6	[10]
(United States) W Blumberg (Australia) J Peers	6^{3}	6	[10]
(Brazil) F Romboli (Brazil) M Zormann	7^{7}	3	[3]

Final
4	(Australia) M Purcell (Australia) J Thompson	7	6
(United States) W Blumberg (Australia) J Peers	5	1
