= 2023 U.S. Men's Clay Court Championships =

- Date: April 3–9
- Edition: 53rd
- Category: ATP Tour 250
- Draw: 28S/16D
- Prize money: $642,735
- Surface: Clay
- Location: Houston, TX, United States
- Venue: River Oaks Country Club

Champions

Singles
- (United States) Frances Tiafoe

Doubles
- (Australia) Max Purcell / (Australia) Jordan Thompson
- U.S. Men's Clay Court Championships

The 2023 U.S. Men's Clay Court Championships (also known as the Fayez Sarofim & Co. U.S. Men's Clay Court Championships for sponsorship purposes) was a tennis tournament played on outdoor clay courts.

It was the 53rd edition of the U.S. Men's Clay Court Championships, and an ATP Tour 250 event on the 2023 ATP Tour. It took place at River Oaks Country Club in Houston, Texas, United States from April 3 through 9, 2023.

== Finals ==
=== Singles ===
- (United States) Frances Tiafoe defeated (Argentina) Tomás Martín Etcheverry, 7–6^{(7–1)}, 7–6^{(8–6)}

=== Doubles ===
- (Australia) Max Purcell / (Australia) Jordan Thompson defeated (United Kingdom) Julian Cash / (United Kingdom) Henry Patten, 4–6, 6–4, [10–5]

== Point and prize money ==
=== Point ===
Event	W	F	SF	QF	Round of 16	Round of 32	Q	Q2	Q1
Singles	250	150	90	45	20	0	12	6	0
Doubles	250	150	90	45	0	—N/a	—N/a	—N/a	—N/a

=== Prize money ===
Event	W	F	SF	QF	Round of 16	Round of 32	Round of 64	Q2	Q1
Singles	$97,760	$57,025	$33,525	$19,425	$11,280	$6,895	—N/a	$3,445	$1,880
Doubles*	$33,960	$18,170	$10,660	$5,950	$3,510	—N/a	—N/a	—N/a	—N/a

_{*per team}

== Singles main draw entrants ==
=== Seeds ===
Country	Player	Rank^{1}	Seed
USA	Frances Tiafoe	14	1
USA	Tommy Paul	19	2
~~USA~~	~~Brandon Nakashima~~	~~45~~	~~3~~
USA	John Isner	46	4
USA	J. J. Wolf	50	5
AUS	Jason Kubler	70	6
USA	Marcos Giron	71	7
ARG	Tomás Martín Etcheverry	73	8

- Rankings are as of 20 March 2023.

=== Other entrants ===
The following players received wildcards into the main draw:

- (United States) Steve Johnson
- (United States) Jack Sock
- (Spain) Fernando Verdasco

The following players received entry via the qualifying draw:

- (Germany) Yannick Hanfmann
- (Czech Republic) Tomáš Macháč
- (Australia) Aleksandar Vukic
- (Japan) Yosuke Watanuki

The following player received entry as a lucky loser:

- (Belgium) Zizou Bergs

=== Withdrawals ===
- (Serbia) Filip Krajinović → replaced by (Netherlands) Gijs Brouwer
- (France) Adrian Mannarino → replaced by (United States) Aleksandar Kovacevic
- (United States) Brandon Nakashima → replaced by (Belgium) Zizou Bergs
- (China) Wu Yibing → replaced by (Germany) Daniel Altmaier

== Doubles main draw entrants ==
=== Seeds ===
Country	Player	Country	Player	Rank^{1}	Seed
AUS	Rinky Hijikata	AUS	Jason Kubler	69	1
USA	Nathaniel Lammons	USA	Jackson Withrow	83	2
GBR	Julian Cash	GBR	Henry Patten	122	3
SWE	André Göransson	JPN	Ben McLachlan	125	4

- Rankings are as of 20 March 2023

=== Other entrants ===
The following pairs received a wildcard into the doubles main draw:

- (United States) William Blumberg / (United States) Christian Harrison
- (United States) Hunter Reese / (United States) Reese Stalder

=== Withdrawals ===
- (Chile) Cristian Garín / (Ecuador) Emilio Gómez → replaced by (Bolivia) Hugo Dellien / (Ecuador) Emilio Gómez
