= 2024 U.S. Men's Clay Court Championships – Singles =

Singles
- 2024 U.S. Men's Clay Court Championships

Final
- Champion: (United States) Ben Shelton
- Runner-up: (United States) Frances Tiafoe
- Score: 7–5, 4–6, 6–3

Details
- Draw: 28 (4 Q / 3 WC)
- Seeds: 8

Events
Singles	Doubles
- U.S. Men's Clay Court Championships

Ben Shelton defeated the defending champion Frances Tiafoe in the first African-American men’s singles tennis final in the Open Era, 7–5, 4–6, 6–3 to win the singles tennis title at the 2024 U.S. Men's Clay Court Championships. It was his second career ATP Tour title, and his first on clay. Shelton became the youngest player to win the tournament since Andy Roddick in 2002.

The second round match between Aleksandar Kovacevic and Jordan Thompson was the longest recorded match in the tournament's history lasting 3 hours and 34 minutes, with two tiebreaks in the last two sets.

== Seeds ==
The top four seeds received a bye into the second round.

1. (United States) Ben Shelton (champion)
2. (Argentina) Francisco Cerúndolo (second round)
3. (United States) Frances Tiafoe (final)
4. (Argentina) Tomás Martín Etcheverry (semifinals)
5. (United States) Christopher Eubanks (first round)
6. (Australia) Jordan Thompson (quarterfinals)
7. (United States) Marcos Giron (quarterfinals)
8. (Australia) Max Purcell (second round)

== Draw ==
Key

- Q = Qualifier
- WC = Wild card
- LL = Lucky loser
- Alt = Alternate
- ITF = ITF entry
- PR = Protected ranking
- SR = Special ranking
- SE = Special exempt
- JE = Junior exempt
- JR = Junior Accelerator Programme entrant
- CO = College Accelerator Programme entrant
- NG = Next Gen Accelerator Program entrant
- w/o = Walkover
- r = Retired
- d = Defaulted

=== Finals ===
Semifinals
1	(United States) Ben Shelton	6^{4}	6	6
4	(Argentina) Tomás Martín Etcheverry	7^{7}	4	4
3	(United States) Frances Tiafoe	6	7^{7}
(Italy) Luciano Darderi	2	6^{2}

Final
1	(United States) Ben Shelton	7	4	6
3	(United States) Frances Tiafoe	5	6	3

=== Top half ===
First round
Q	(United States) P Kypson	6^{5}	3
(Belgium) Z Bergs	7^{7}	6
(Croatia) D Ajduković	1	4
(United States) B Nakashima	6	6
(Australia) R Hijikata	7^{7}	7^{7}
5	(United States) C Eubanks	6^{4}	6^{2}
(Colombia) DE Galán	7^{15}	6
(France) B Paire	6^{13}	4
WC	(United States) M Mmoh	6	7^{7}
(Peru) JP Varillas	2	6^{4}
(United States) A Michelsen	5	7^{7}	4
8	(Australia) M Purcell	7	6^{4}	6

Second round
1	(United States) B Shelton	3	6	6
(Belgium) Z Bergs	6	4	3
(United States) B Nakashima	6	6
(Australia) R Hijikata	1	4
4	(Argentina) TM Etcheverry	6	6
(Colombia) DE Galán	4	4
WC	(United States) M Mmoh	6	7
8	(Australia) M Purcell	2	5

Quarterfinals
1	(United States) B Shelton	7	7^{11}
(United States) B Nakashima	5	6^{9}
4	(Argentina) TM Etcheverry	6	0
WC	(United States) M Mmoh	3	1^{r}

Semifinals
1	(United States) B Shelton	6^{4}	6	6
4	(Argentina) TM Etcheverry	7^{7}	4	4

=== Bottom half ===
First round
6	(Australia) J Thompson	6	6
Q	(China) Y Wu	4	4
(Australia) T Kokkinakis	6^{3}	7^{7}	4
(United States) A Kovacevic	7^{7}	6^{2}	6
Q	(Netherlands) G Brouwer	3	3
(Australia) J Duckworth	6	6
7	(United States) M Giron	6	7
WC	(Canada) D Shapovalov	2	5
Q	(Switzerland) A Ritschard	3	6	4
(United States) JJ Wolf	6	2	6
(Italy) L Darderi	3	7^{7}	6
WC	(United States) D Kudla	6	6^{3}	2

Second round
6	(Australia) J Thompson	4	7^{7}	7^{9}
(United States) A Kovacevic	6	6^{1}	6^{7}
(Australia) J Duckworth	2	7^{7}	5
3	(United States) F Tiafoe	6	6^{4}	7
7	(United States) M Giron	6	6
(United States) JJ Wolf	4	3
(Italy) L Darderi	6	2	7^{7}
2	(Argentina) F Cerúndolo	4	6	6^{4}

Quarterfinals
6	(Australia) J Thompson	6^{8}	4
3	(United States) F Tiafoe	7^{10}	6
7	(United States) M Giron	0	4
(Italy) L Darderi	6	6

Semifinals
3	(United States) F Tiafoe	6	7^{7}
(Italy) L Darderi	2	6^{2}

== Qualifying ==
=== Seeds ===
1. (Canada) Gabriel Diallo (first round)
2. (United States) Patrick Kypson (qualified)
3. (Monaco) Valentin Vacherot (qualifying competition)
4. (Kazakhstan) Denis Yevseyev (qualifying competition)
5. (Switzerland) Alexander Ritschard (qualified)
6. (Netherlands) Gijs Brouwer (qualified)
7. (France) Clément Tabur (first round)
8. (United States) Martin Damm (first round)

=== Qualifiers ===
1. (Netherlands) Gijs Brouwer
2. (United States) Patrick Kypson
3. (Switzerland) Alexander Ritschard
4. (China) Wu Yibing

=== Qualifying draw ===
==== First qualifier ====
First round
1	(Canada) Gabriel Diallo	6^{4}	6^{6}
(United States) Mitchell Krueger	7^{7}	7^{8}
(United States) Tristan Boyer	0	6	6^{4}
6	(Netherlands) Gijs Brouwer	6	3	7^{7}

Qualifying competition
(United States) Mitchell Krueger	3	6^{7}
6	(Netherlands) Gijs Brouwer	6	7^{9}

==== Second qualifier ====
First round
2	(United States) Patrick Kypson	6	6
WC	(New Zealand) Kiranpal Pannu	2	2
(United States) Brandon Holt	7	1	6
8	(United States) Martin Damm	5	6	2

Qualifying competition
2	(United States) Patrick Kypson	4
(United States) Brandon Holt	1^{r}

==== Third qualifier ====
First round
3	(Monaco) Valentin Vacherot	3	6	6
(United States) Ethan Quinn	6	3	4
Alt	(United States) Alex Rybakov	4	4
5	(Switzerland) Alexander Ritschard	6	6

Qualifying competition
3	(Monaco) Valentin Vacherot	6^{4}	6^{5}
5	(Switzerland) Alexander Ritschard	7^{7}	7^{7}

==== Fourth qualifier ====
First round
4	(Kazakhstan) Denis Yevseyev	6	6
Alt	(United States) Stefan Kozlov	2	0
WC	(China) Wu Yibing	6	6
7	(France) Clément Tabur	4	4

Qualifying competition
4	(Kazakhstan) Denis Yevseyev	6^{3}	3
WC	(China) Wu Yibing	7^{7}	6
