= 2022 Atlanta Open – Doubles =

Doubles
- 2022 Atlanta Open

Final
- Champions: (Australia) Thanasi Kokkinakis (Australia) Nick Kyrgios
- Runners-up: (Australia) Jason Kubler (Australia) John Peers
- Score: 7–6^{(7–4)}, 7–5

Events
Singles	Doubles
- Atlanta Open

Thanasi Kokkinakis and Nick Kyrgios defeated Jason Kubler and John Peers in the final, 7–6^{(7–4)}, 7–5 to win the doubles tennis title at the 2022 Atlanta Open.

Reilly Opelka and Jannik Sinner were the reigning champions, but did not participate this year.

Rajeev Ram would have taken over the ATP no. 1 doubles ranking from his regular partner Joe Salisbury by winning the title partnering Jack Sock, but lost to Kokkinakis and Kyrgios in the semifinals.

== Seeds ==
1. (Croatia) Ivan Dodig / (United States) Austin Krajicek (first round)
2. (Australia) Thanasi Kokkinakis / (Australia) Nick Kyrgios (champions)
3. (United States) Rajeev Ram / (United States) Jack Sock (semifinals)
4. (Australia) Matthew Ebden / (Australia) Max Purcell (quarterfinals)

== Draw ==
Key

- Q = Qualifier
- WC = Wild card
- LL = Lucky loser
- Alt = Alternate
- ITF = ITF entry
- PR = Protected ranking
- SR = Special ranking
- SE = Special exempt
- JE = Junior exempt
- JR = Junior Accelerator Programme entrant
- CO = College Accelerator Programme entrant
- NG = Next Gen Accelerator Program entrant
- w/o = Walkover
- r = Retired
- d = Defaulted

=== Draw ===
First round
1	(Croatia) I Dodig (United States) A Krajicek	3	6^{1}
(Mexico) S González (Argentina) A Molteni	6	7^{7}
Alt	(France) Q Halys (France) A Mannarino	7^{7}	4	[8]
WC	(United States) C Eubanks (United States) M McDonald	6^{3}	6	[10]
4	(Australia) M Ebden (Australia) M Purcell	6	7^{7}
(Australia) A Popyrin (United States) F Tiafoe	3	6^{4}
(Australia) J Kubler (Australia) J Peers	6	6
WC	(Colombia) A Duarte (Spain) Á Regalado Pedrol	3	2
(United States) S Johnson (United States) T Paul	6	1	[10]
(Australia) A de Minaur (Australia) L Saville	4	6	[8]
(Mexico) H Hach Verdugo (India) R Ramanathan	3	3
3	(United States) R Ram (United States) J Sock	6	6
(Ecuador) G Escobar (United States) H Reese	3	6	[10]
(South Africa) R Klaasen (Brazil) M Melo	6	3	[5]
(France) N Mahut (France) É Roger-Vasselin	6^{8}	3
2	(Australia) T Kokkinakis (Australia) N Kyrgios	7^{10}	6

Quarterfinals
(Mexico) S González (Argentina) A Molteni	6	3	[5]
WC	(United States) C Eubanks (United States) M McDonald	3	6	[10]
4	(Australia) M Ebden (Australia) M Purcell	6	6^{0}	[6]
(Australia) J Kubler (Australia) J Peers	4	7^{7}	[10]
(United States) S Johnson (United States) T Paul	5	4
3	(United States) R Ram (United States) J Sock	7	6
(Ecuador) G Escobar (United States) H Reese	4	6^{3}
2	(Australia) T Kokkinakis (Australia) N Kyrgios	6	7^{7}

Semifinals
WC	(United States) C Eubanks (United States) M McDonald	4	5
(Australia) J Kubler (Australia) J Peers	6	7
3	(United States) R Ram (United States) J Sock	4	7^{9}	[2]
2	(Australia) T Kokkinakis (Australia) N Kyrgios	6	6^{7}	[10]

Final
(Australia) J Kubler (Australia) J Peers	6^{4}	5
2	(Australia) T Kokkinakis (Australia) N Kyrgios	7^{7}	7
