= 2025 U.S. Men's Clay Court Championships – Doubles =

Doubles
- 2025 U.S. Men's Clay Court Championships

Final
- Champions: (Brazil) Fernando Romboli (Australia) John-Patrick Smith
- Runners-up: (Argentina) Federico Agustín Gómez (Mexico) Santiago González
- Score: 6–1, 6–4

Details
- Draw: 16
- Seeds: 4

Events
Singles	Doubles
← 2024 ·	U.S. Men's Clay Court Championships	· 2026 →

Fernando Romboli and John-Patrick Smith defeated Federico Agustín Gómez and Santiago González in the final, 6–1, 6–4 to win the doubles tennis title at the 2025 U.S. Men's Clay Court Championships. It was the second ATP Tour doubles title for both players.

Max Purcell and Jordan Thompson were the two-time reigning champions, but Purcell did not participate this year as he was serving a voluntary provisional suspension. Thompson partnered Rinky Hijikata, but they lost in the quarterfinals to Matthew Romios and Adam Walton.

== Seeds ==
1. (United States) Robert Galloway / (United States) Jackson Withrow (semifinals)
2. (United States) Christian Harrison / (United States) Evan King (first round)
3. (United States) Austin Krajicek / (United States) Rajeev Ram (quarterfinals)
4. (Australia) Rinky Hijikata / (Australia) Jordan Thompson (quarterfinals)

== Draw ==
Key

- Q = Qualifier
- WC = Wild card
- LL = Lucky loser
- Alt = Alternate
- ITF = ITF entry
- PR = Protected ranking
- SR = Special ranking
- SE = Special exempt
- JE = Junior exempt
- JR = Junior Accelerator Programme entrant
- CO = College Accelerator Programme entrant
- NG = Next Gen Accelerator Program entrant
- w/o = Walkover
- r = Retired
- d = Defaulted

=== Draw ===
First round
1	(United States) R Galloway (United States) J Withrow	6	6
WC	(United States) M Mmoh (United States) F Tiafoe	3	2
(Colombia) N Barrientos (India) RC Bollipalli	5	4
(Brazil) R Matos (Brazil) M Zormann	7	6
3	(United States) A Krajicek (United States) R Ram	6	6
Alt	(Canada) L Draxl (Canada) C Harper	4	2
(India) S Balaji (Mexico) MÁ Reyes-Varela	6^{3}	3
(Argentina) FA Gómez (Mexico) S González	7^{7}	6
(United States) M McDonald (United States) A Michelsen	6^{5}	6	[8]
(Australia) MC Romios (Australia) A Walton	7^{7}	4	[10]
(United States) R Cash (United States) JJ Tracy	6	6^{1}	[9]
4	(Australia) R Hijikata (Australia) J Thompson	3	7^{7}	[11]
(Brazil) F Romboli (Australia) J-P Smith	6	6
WC	(United States) J Brooksby (United States) L Tien	3	4
(United States) R Seggerman (United States) P Trhac	6	1	[14]
2	(United States) C Harrison (United States) E King	2	6	[12]

Quarterfinals
1	(United States) R Galloway (United States) J Withrow	5	6	[10]
(Brazil) R Matos (Brazil) M Zormann	7	3	[7]
3	(United States) A Krajicek (United States) R Ram	4	4
(Argentina) FA Gómez (Mexico) S González	6	6
(Australia) MC Romios (Australia) A Walton	6	6
4	(Australia) R Hijikata (Australia) J Thompson	1	4
(Brazil) F Romboli (Australia) J-P Smith	7^{11}	7^{7}
(United States) R Seggerman (United States) P Trhac	6^{9}	6^{5}

Semifinals
1	(United States) R Galloway (United States) J Withrow	4	2
(Argentina) FA Gómez (Mexico) S González	6	6
(Australia) MC Romios (Australia) A Walton	6^{3}	3
(Brazil) F Romboli (Australia) J-P Smith	7^{7}	6

Final
(Argentina) FA Gómez (Mexico) S González	1	4
(Brazil) F Romboli (Australia) J-P Smith	6	6
