= 2023 U.S. Men's Clay Court Championships – Singles =

Singles
- 2023 U.S. Men's Clay Court Championships

Final
- Champion: (United States) Frances Tiafoe
- Runner-up: (Argentina) Tomás Martín Etcheverry
- Score: 7–6^{(7–1)}, 7–6^{(8–6)}

Details
- Draw: 28 (4 Q / 3 WC)
- Seeds: 8

Events
Singles	Doubles
- U.S. Men's Clay Court Championships

Frances Tiafoe defeated Tomás Martín Etcheverry in the final, 7–6^{(7–1)}, 7–6^{(8–6)} to win the singles tennis title at the 2023 U.S. Men's Clay Court Championships. It was Tiafoe's first ATP Tour title in five years.

Reilly Opelka was the reigning champion, but could not defend his title due to injury.

Rain disrupted play midway through the tournament, causing several second round matches and all quarterfinals to be moved to Saturday, with the semifinals and final played on Sunday.

== Seeds ==
The top four seeds received a bye into the second round.

1. (United States) Frances Tiafoe (champion)
2. (United States) Tommy Paul (second round)
3. (United States) Brandon Nakashima (withdrew)
4. (United States) John Isner (second round)
5. (United States) J. J. Wolf (quarterfinals)
6. (Australia) Jason Kubler (quarterfinals)
7. (United States) Marcos Giron (second round)
8. (Argentina) Tomás Martín Etcheverry (final)

== Draw ==
Key

- Q = Qualifier
- WC = Wild card
- LL = Lucky loser
- Alt = Alternate
- ITF = ITF entry
- PR = Protected ranking
- SR = Special ranking
- SE = Special exempt
- JE = Junior exempt
- JR = Junior Accelerator Programme entrant
- CO = College Accelerator Programme entrant
- NG = Next Gen Accelerator Program entrant
- w/o = Walkover
- r = Retired
- d = Defaulted

=== Finals ===
Semifinals
1	(United States) Frances Tiafoe	6	6
(Netherlands) Gijs Brouwer	4	1
8	(Argentina) Tomás Martín Etcheverry	6	6
Q	(Germany) Yannick Hanfmann	3	4

Final
1	(United States) Frances Tiafoe	7^{7}	7^{8}
8	(Argentina) Tomás Martín Etcheverry	6^{1}	6^{6}

=== Top half ===
First round
WC	(United States) S Johnson	7^{7}	1	6
(Argentina) F Bagnis	6^{5}	6	1
(Colombia) DE Galán	6	6
(China) Z Zhang	2	3
WC	(Spain) F Verdasco	6^{7}	0
6	(Australia) J Kubler	7^{9}	6
(United States) A Kovacevic	4	4
(Netherlands) G Brouwer	6	6
Q	(Australia) A Vukic	4	6	4
(United States) D Kudla	6	4	6
(Australia) J Thompson	3	2
5	(United States) JJ Wolf	6	6

Second round
1	(United States) F Tiafoe	6	6
WC	(United States) S Johnson	2	4
(Colombia) DE Galán	4	2
6	(Australia) J Kubler	6	6
4	(United States) J Isner	4	6^{4}
(Netherlands) G Brouwer	6	7^{7}
(United States) D Kudla	4	1
5	(United States) JJ Wolf	6	6

Quarterfinals
1	(United States) F Tiafoe	6	6
6	(Australia) J Kubler	4	4
(Netherlands) G Brouwer	6	6
5	(United States) JJ Wolf	3	4

Semifinals
1	(United States) F Tiafoe	6	6
(Netherlands) G Brouwer	4	1

=== Bottom half ===
First round
8	(Argentina) TM Etcheverry	6	6
(Argentina) JM Cerúndolo	3	4
(Australia) M Purcell	6	3	6
(Germany) D Altmaier	4	6	3
(Bolivia) H Dellien	3	0
(Chile) C Garín	6	6
7	(United States) M Giron	6	6
(Ecuador) E Gómez	0	2
Q	(Czech Republic) T Macháč	6	6
WC	(United States) J Sock	2	4
Q	(Germany) Y Hanfmann	6	3	6
Q	(Japan) Y Watanuki	4	6	2

Second round
8	(Argentina) TM Etcheverry	7^{7}	6
(Australia) M Purcell	6^{5}	1
(Chile) C Garín	7^{7}	7^{7}
LL	(Belgium) Z Bergs	6^{4}	6^{1}
7	(United States) M Giron	4	4
Q	(Czech Republic) T Macháč	6	6
Q	(Germany) Y Hanfmann	7^{8}	6
2	(United States) T Paul	6^{6}	2

Quarterfinals
8	(Argentina) TM Etcheverry	6	6^{2}	6
(Chile) C Garín	1	7^{7}	3
Q	(Czech Republic) T Macháč	2	1
Q	(Germany) Y Hanfmann	6	6

Semifinals
8	(Argentina) TM Etcheverry	6	6
Q	(Germany) Y Hanfmann	3	4

== Qualifying ==
=== Seeds ===
1. (Japan) Yosuke Watanuki (qualified)
2. (Australia) Rinky Hijikata (first round)
3. (Germany) Yannick Hanfmann (qualified)
4. (Belgium) Zizou Bergs (qualifying competition, lucky loser)
5. (Czech Republic) Tomáš Macháč (qualified)
6. (Chile) Alejandro Tabilo (first round)
7. (Argentina) Facundo Díaz Acosta (qualifying competition)
8. (Brazil) Felipe Meligeni Alves (qualifying competition)

=== Qualifiers ===
1. (Japan) Yosuke Watanuki
2. (Czech Republic) Tomáš Macháč
3. (Germany) Yannick Hanfmann
4. (Australia) Aleksandar Vukic

=== Lucky loser ===
1. (Belgium) Zizou Bergs

=== Qualifying draw ===
==== First qualifier ====
First round
1	(Japan) Yosuke Watanuki	7^{7}	6
WC	(Croatia) Matija Pecotić	6^{4}	4
(China) Shang Juncheng	6^{3}	1^{r}
8	(Brazil) Felipe Meligeni Alves	7^{7}	4

Qualifying competition
1	(Japan) Yosuke Watanuki	7	5	6
8	(Brazil) Felipe Meligeni Alves	5	7	4

==== Second qualifier ====
First round
2	(Australia) Rinky Hijikata	7^{7}	3	2
(United States) Brandon Holt	6^{4}	6	6
Alt	(Argentina) Genaro Alberto Olivieri	0	3
5	(Czech Republic) Tomáš Macháč	6	6

Qualifying competition
(United States) Brandon Holt	2	4
5	(Czech Republic) Tomáš Macháč	6	6

==== Third qualifier ====
First round
3	(Germany) Yannick Hanfmann	6	6
(France) Enzo Couacaud	0	3
(South Korea) Hong Seong-chan	2	3
7	(Argentina) Facundo Díaz Acosta	6	6

Qualifying competition
3	(Germany) Yannick Hanfmann	7	6
7	(Argentina) Facundo Díaz Acosta	5	2

==== Fourth qualifier ====
First round
4	(Belgium) Zizou Bergs	6	6
WC	(United States) Zachary Svajda	2	2
(Australia) Aleksandar Vukic	6	7
6	(Chile) Alejandro Tabilo	4	5

Qualifying competition
4	(Belgium) Zizou Bergs	2	3
(Australia) Aleksandar Vukic	6	6
