= 2023 U.S. Men's Clay Court Championships – Doubles =

Doubles
- 2023 U.S. Men's Clay Court Championships

Final
- Champions: (Australia) Max Purcell (Australia) Jordan Thompson
- Runners-up: (United Kingdom) Julian Cash (United Kingdom) Henry Patten
- Score: 4–6, 6–4, [10–5]

Details
- Draw: 16
- Seeds: 4

Events
Singles	Doubles
← 2022 ·	U.S. Men's Clay Court Championships	· 2024 →

Defending champion Max Purcell and his partner Jordan Thompson defeated Julian Cash and Henry Patten in the final, 4–6, 6–4, [10–5] to win the doubles tennis title at the 2023 U.S. Men's Clay Court Championships.

Matthew Ebden and Purcell were the reigning champions, but Ebden chose not to compete this year.

== Seeds ==
1. (Australia) Rinky Hijikata / (Australia) Jason Kubler (quarterfinals)
2. (United States) Nathaniel Lammons / (United States) Jackson Withrow (quarterfinals)
3. (United Kingdom) Julian Cash / (United Kingdom) Henry Patten (final)
4. (Sweden) André Göransson / (Japan) Ben McLachlan (quarterfinals)

== Draw ==
Key

- Q = Qualifier
- WC = Wild card
- LL = Lucky loser
- Alt = Alternate
- ITF = ITF entry
- PR = Protected ranking
- SR = Special ranking
- SE = Special exempt
- JE = Junior exempt
- JR = Junior Accelerator Programme entrant
- CO = College Accelerator Programme entrant
- NG = Next Gen Accelerator Program entrant
- w/o = Walkover
- r = Retired
- d = Defaulted

=== Draw ===
First round
1	(Australia) R Hijikata (Australia) J Kubler	6	7
WC	(United States) W Blumberg (United States) C Harrison	2	5
(India) Y Bhambri (India) S Myneni	6^{6}	6	[5]
(United States) R Galloway (Mexico) MÁ Reyes-Varela	7^{8}	2	[10]
3	(United Kingdom) J Cash (United Kingdom) H Patten	6	6
PR	(Bolivia) H Dellien (Ecuador) E Gómez	1	4
(Jamaica) D Brown (United States) F Tiafoe	2	4
(Argentina) F Bagnis (Argentina) TM Etcheverry	6	6
(Kazakhstan) A Golubev (Kazakhstan) A Nedovyesov	2	7^{7}	[10]
(France) J Eysseric (Netherlands) D Pel	6	6^{5}	[4]
(Argentina) G Andreozzi (Argentina) G Durán	6	3	[5]
4	(Sweden) A Göransson (Japan) B McLachlan	4	6	[10]
(Australia) M Purcell (Australia) J Thompson	6	6
WC	(United States) H Reese (United States) R Stalder	1	4
(Mexico) S González (Mexico) H Hach Verdugo	3	4
2	(United States) N Lammons (United States) J Withrow	6	6

Quarterfinals
1	(Australia) R Hijikata (Australia) J Kubler
(United States) R Galloway (Mexico) MÁ Reyes-Varela	w/o
3	(United Kingdom) J Cash (United Kingdom) H Patten	w/o
(Argentina) F Bagnis (Argentina) TM Etcheverry
(Kazakhstan) A Golubev (Kazakhstan) A Nedovyesov	6	6
4	(Sweden) A Göransson (Japan) B McLachlan	4	4
(Australia) M Purcell (Australia) J Thompson	6	7^{9}
2	(United States) N Lammons (United States) J Withrow	4	6^{7}

Semifinals
(United States) R Galloway (Mexico) MÁ Reyes-Varela	7^{8}	6^{4}	[5]
3	(United Kingdom) J Cash (United Kingdom) H Patten	6^{6}	7^{7}	[10]
(Kazakhstan) A Golubev (Kazakhstan) A Nedovyesov	6^{6}	6^{5}
(Australia) M Purcell (Australia) J Thompson	7^{8}	7^{7}

Final
3	(United Kingdom) J Cash (United Kingdom) H Patten	6	4	[5]
(Australia) M Purcell (Australia) J Thompson	4	6	[10]
