= 2026 U.S. Men's Clay Court Championships – Doubles =

Doubles
- 2026 U.S. Men's Clay Court Championships

Final
- Champions: (Ecuador) Andrés Andrade (United States) Ben Shelton
- Runners-up: (Brazil) Orlando Luz (Brazil) Rafael Matos
- Score: 4–6, 6–3, [10–6]

Details
- Draw: 16
- Seeds: 4

Events
Singles	Doubles
- U.S. Men's Clay Court Championships

Andrés Andrade and Ben Shelton defeated Orlando Luz and Rafael Matos in the final, 4–6, 6–3, [10–6] to win the doubles tennis title at the 2026 U.S. Men's Clay Court Championships. It was the first ATP Tour doubles title for both players.

Fernando Romboli and John-Patrick Smith were the reigning champions, but Smith did not participate. Romboli partnered Santiago González, but lost in the quarterfinals to Rinky Hijikata and Ryan Seggerman.

== Seeds ==
1. (Brazil) Orlando Luz / (Brazil) Rafael Matos (final)
2. (Mexico) Santiago González / (Brazil) Fernando Romboli (quarterfinals)
3. (Brazil) Marcelo Demoliner / (United States) Robert Galloway (quarterfinals)
4. (United States) Evan King / (United States) Reese Stalder (quarterfinals)

== Draw ==
Key

- Q = Qualifier
- WC = Wild card
- LL = Lucky loser
- Alt = Alternate
- ITF = ITF entry
- PR = Protected ranking
- SR = Special ranking
- SE = Special exempt
- JE = Junior exempt
- JR = Junior Accelerator Programme entrant
- CO = College Accelerator Programme entrant
- NG = Next Gen Accelerator Program entrant
- w/o = Walkover
- r = Retired
- d = Defaulted

=== Draw ===
First round
1	(Brazil) O Luz (Brazil) R Matos	6	4	[10]
WC	(United States) N Lammons (United States) J Withrow	3	6	[3]
PR	(Kazakhstan) A Golubev (Kazakhstan) A Nedovyesov	5	2
(Argentina) RA Burruchaga (Argentina) TA Tirante	7	6
4	(United States) E King (United States) R Stalder	6	7^{7}
(Australia) B Bayldon (Australia) A Walton	3	6^{5}
(Ecuador) D Hidalgo (United States) P Trhac	6^{6}	5
(United States) M McDonald (Australia) M Polmans	7^{8}	7
(United States) B Kittay (United States) R Ram	6^{3}	4
WC	(Ecuador) A Andrade (United States) B Shelton	7^{7}	6
(France) A Reymond (France) L Sanchez	4	4
3	(Brazil) M Demoliner (United States) R Galloway	6	6
(Australia) J Peers (Netherlands) J-J Rojer	6	3	[2]
(Australia) R Hijikata (United States) R Seggerman	3	6	[10]
(United States) A Michelsen (United States) L Tien	6	3	[11]
2	(Mexico) S González (Brazil) F Romboli	4	6	[13]

Quarterfinals
1	(Brazil) O Luz (Brazil) R Matos	7^{7}	6
(Argentina) RA Burruchaga (Argentina) TA Tirante	6^{4}	4
4	(United States) E King (United States) R Stalder	6^{10}	6^{1}
(United States) M McDonald (Australia) M Polmans	7^{12}	7^{7}
WC	(Ecuador) A Andrade (United States) B Shelton	3	6	[10]
3	(Brazil) M Demoliner (United States) R Galloway	6	1	[8]
(Australia) R Hijikata (United States) R Seggerman	6	4	[10]
2	(Mexico) S González (Brazil) F Romboli	4	6	[7]

Semifinals
1	(Brazil) O Luz (Brazil) R Matos	7	6
(United States) M McDonald (Australia) M Polmans	5	1
WC	(Ecuador) A Andrade (United States) B Shelton	6	6
(Australia) R Hijikata (United States) R Seggerman	1	2

Final
1	(Brazil) O Luz (Brazil) R Matos	6	3	[6]
WC	(Ecuador) A Andrade (United States) B Shelton	4	6	[10]
