= Brad Stine (tennis coach) =

American tennis coach (born 1958)

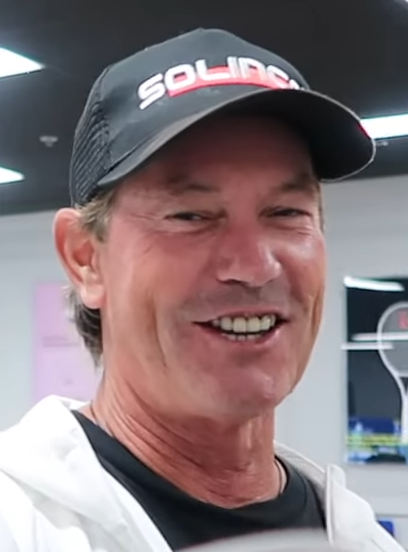
- Stine in 2023
- Born: December 25, 1958 (age 67) San Mateo, California, U.S.

Brad Stine (born December 25, 1958) is an American tennis coach from Fresno, California. He coached former No. 1 ATP player Jim Courier.

== Coaching history ==
=== Collegiate coaching (1985 - 1991) ===
Upon graduation, Stine began working as an assistant coach for the men's tennis team at his alma mater, California State University, Fresno. After three years, Stine, then-26 years old, was elevated to the head tennis coach position. Stine led Fresno State to their first-ever top 20 NCAA Division I national ranking. In 1990 and 1991, Stine was named the Big West Coach of the Year. Stine resigned in 1991 when he took a full-time coaching position with Jim Courier.

=== Junior coaching (1986 - 1991) ===
While serving as the head coach of the men's tennis team at Fresno State, Stine began coaching with the USTA in 1986. Stine specifically assisted with the training of the members of the US junior national team along with Greg Patton. During that time, Stine worked alongside several burgeoning talents on the junior national team (Junior Davis Cup Team), including Jim Courier, Pete Sampras, Michael Chang, MaliVai Washington, Todd Martin, Jonathan Stark, Jared Palmer, David Wheaton, and Jeff Tarango, all of whom reached top 100 ATP ranking Stine worked with the USTA on a part-time basis until 1991, when he was hired on a full-time basis by Jim Courier to serve as his head coach.

=== Pro coaching (1991 - present) ===
After concluding his tenure as a collegiate tennis coach, Stine entered into the world of professional coaching, joining the coaching staff of American rising star Jim Courier. Stine first joined Courier's team in late 1990, just after Courier had broken into the top 25 of the ATP rankings. During their first partnership, Courier captured four Grand Slam titles and ascended to the number one ranking. Stine and Courier parted ways midway through the 1994 season, but would reunite for a second stint from 1997 to 2000, when Courier ultimately retired from professional tennis.

Stine took up several coaching opportunities in between his years with Courier. He began coaching Andrei Medvedev in May of 1994. Medvedev and Stine parted ways in early 1995. During this time, Medvedev was ranked within the top ten and won 1 tour title.

After his time with Medvedev, Stine began coaching Jonathan Stark in 1995. Jonathan had previously been ranked as the number one ATP doubles player with Byron Black. Under Stine, Jonathan won one of his two singles tour titles in Singapore in 1996.) Their partnership ended in 1997 when Stine returned to coaching Courier.

Following Courier's retirement, Stine took on two more Americans, the first of whom was future Olympic silver medalist Mardy Fish. Stine coached Fish from 2000 until August of 2002. During this stint, Stine helped Fish improve his ranking from 365 to 126. Fish would eventually crack the top 10 in 2011.

Stine subsequently began coaching Taylor Dent in November of 2002. Under Stine's guidance, Dent had one of his most successful years on the tour, winning one of his four singles titles: the 2003 St. Jude Classic, where he upset defending champion and eventual US Open champion Andy Roddick in the final. Stine and Dent parted ways about a month following his victory in Memphis.

Stine coached Sébastien Grosjean between 2005 and 2006. During this time, Grosjean was ranked in the top 25 in the ATP rankings and reached quarterfinals of both the Australian Open and Wimbledon. Stine and Grosjean ended their coaching relationship in September of 2006.

In the following years, Stine also coached Sargis Sargsian and Byron Black.

In March of 2018, Kevin Anderson announced on his Twitter account that Stine would be joining his team as his 2018 touring coach. Under Stine, Anderson made it to the 2018 Wimbledon final and a new career-high of No. 5.

He has been the coach of Australian Open semi-finalist Tommy Paul since 2020.

Stine is currently a US National Coach for the USTA in Boca Raton, FL. Previously, he directed his 360 Tennis Academy out of Fresno, California. He has appeared on Tennis Channel Academy.
