= 2024 U.S. Men's Clay Court Championships =

- Date: April 1–7
- Edition: 54th
- Category: ATP Tour 250
- Draw: 28S/16D
- Prize money: $661.585
- Surface: Clay
- Location: Houston, TX, United States
- Venue: River Oaks Country Club

Champions

Singles
- (United States) Ben Shelton

Doubles
- (Australia) Max Purcell / (Australia) Jordan Thompson
- U.S. Men's Clay Court Championships

The 2024 U.S. Men's Clay Court Championships (also known as the Fayez Sarofim & Co. U.S. Men's Clay Court Championships for sponsorship purposes) was a tennis tournament played on outdoor clay courts.

It was the 54th edition of the U.S. Men's Clay Court Championships, and an ATP Tour 250 event on the 2024 ATP Tour. It took place at River Oaks Country Club in Houston, Texas, United States from April 1 through 7, 2024.

== Finals ==
=== Singles ===
- (United States) Ben Shelton defeated (United States) Frances Tiafoe, 7–5, 4–6, 6–3

=== Doubles ===
- (Australia) Max Purcell / (Australia) Jordan Thompson defeated (United States) William Blumberg / (Australia) John Peers, 7–5, 6–1

== Singles main draw entrants ==
=== Seeds ===
| Country | Player | Rank^{1} | Seed |
|---|---|---|---|
| USA | Ben Shelton | 17 | 1 |
| ARG | Francisco Cerúndolo | 21 | 2 |
| USA | Frances Tiafoe | 22 | 3 |
| ARG | Tomás Martín Etcheverry | 30 | 4 |
| USA | Christopher Eubanks | 32 | 5 |
| AUS | Jordan Thompson | 34 | 6 |
| USA | Marcos Giron | 51 | 7 |
| AUS | Max Purcell | 68 | 8 |

- Rankings are as of 18 March 2024.

=== Other entrants ===
The following players received wildcards into the main draw:

- (United States) Denis Kudla
- (United States) Michael Mmoh
- (Canada) Denis Shapovalov

The following players received entry via the qualifying draw:

- (Netherlands) Gijs Brouwer
- (United States) Patrick Kypson
- (Switzerland) Alexander Ritschard
- (China) Wu Yibing

=== Withdrawals ===
- (Japan) Taro Daniel → replaced by (Australia) James Duckworth
- (Germany) Yannick Hanfmann → replaced by (Australia) Thanasi Kokkinakis
- (United States) Mackenzie McDonald → replaced by (United States) J. J. Wolf
- (Japan) Kei Nishikori → replaced by (Croatia) Duje Ajduković
- (United States) Tommy Paul → replaced by (United States) Brandon Nakashima

== Doubles main draw entrants ==
=== Seeds ===
| Country | Player | Country | Player | Rank^{1} | Seed |
|---|---|---|---|---|---|
| USA | Austin Krajicek | USA | Rajeev Ram | 8 | 1 |
| USA | Nathaniel Lammons | USA | Jackson Withrow | 44 | 2 |
| GBR | Julian Cash | USA | Robert Galloway | 89 | 3 |
| AUS | Max Purcell | AUS | Jordan Thompson | 91 | 4 |

- Rankings are as of 18 March 2024

=== Other entrants ===
The following pairs received a wildcard into the doubles main draw:

- (Ecuador) Andrés Andrade / (United States) Ben Shelton
- (United States) Michael Mmoh / (United States) Frances Tiafoe

=== Withdrawals ===
- (Mexico) Santiago González / (United Kingdom) Neal Skupski → replaced by (India) Arjun Kadhe / (India) Jeevan Nedunchezhiyan
