= 2022 Atlanta Open – Singles =

Singles
- 2022 Atlanta Open

Final
- Champion: (Australia) Alex de Minaur
- Runner-up: (United States) Jenson Brooksby
- Score: 6–3, 6–3

Details
- Draw: 28
- Seeds: 8

Events
Singles	Doubles
← 2021 ·	Atlanta Open	· 2023 →

Alex de Minaur defeated Jenson Brooksby in the final, 6–3, 6–3 to win the singles title at the 2022 Atlanta Open. It was de Minaur's second Atlanta title, the first being in 2019.

John Isner was the defending champion, but lost in the quarterfinals to Brooksby.

== Seeds ==
The top four seeds received a bye into the second round.

1. (United States) Reilly Opelka (withdrew)
2. (United States) John Isner (quarterfinals)
3. (Australia) Alex de Minaur (champion)
4. (United States) Frances Tiafoe (semifinals)
5. (United States) Tommy Paul (quarterfinals)
6. (United States) Jenson Brooksby (final)
7. (Australia) Nick Kyrgios (withdrew)
8. (United States) Brandon Nakashima (quarterfinals)

== Draw ==
=== Key ===
- Q = Qualifier
- WC = Wild card
- LL = Lucky loser
- Alt = Alternate
- SE = Special exempt
- PR = Protected ranking
- ITF = ITF entry
- JE = Junior exempt
- w/o = Walkover
- r = Retired
- d = Defaulted
- SR = Special ranking

=== Finals ===
Semifinals
Ilya Ivashka	7	2	2
3	(Australia) Alex de Minaur	5	6	6
4	(United States) Frances Tiafoe	1	4
6	(United States) Jenson Brooksby	6	6

Final
3	(Australia) Alex de Minaur	6	6
6	(United States) Jenson Brooksby	3	3

=== Top half ===
First round
(France) Q Halys	0	6	3
I Ivashka	6	3	6
(South Korea) S-w Kwon	7^{7}	4	7
(United States) M Giron	6^{3}	6	5
WC	(United States) J Sock	1	1
5	(United States) T Paul	6	6
Q	(Germany) D Koepfer	1	7^{7}	3
(Australia) J Duckworth	6	6^{5}	6
WC	(United States) A Martin	6	6
(Australia) T Kokkinakis	3	2
Q	(Germany) P Gojowczyk	3	6^{7}
LL	(France) A Mannarino	6	7^{9}

Second round
LL	(United States) S Johnson	6	2	4
I Ivashka	4	6	6
(South Korea) S-w Kwon	3	3
5	(United States) T Paul	6	6
3	(Australia) A de Minaur	6	6
(Australia) J Duckworth	4	4
WC	(United States) A Martin	5	3
LL	(France) A Mannarino	7	6

Quarterfinals
I Ivashka	6	3	6
5	(United States) T Paul	2	6	1
3	(Australia) A de Minaur	4	6	6
LL	(France) A Mannarino	6	3	0

Semifinals
I Ivashka	7	2	2
3	(Australia) A de Minaur	5	6	6

=== Bottom half ===
First round
8	(United States) B Nakashima	7^{7}	3	6
(Australia) J Thompson	6^{5}	6	3
(Australia) J Millman	7^{7}	4	6
(Australia) A Popyrin	6^{1}	6	3
Q	(Japan) T Daniel	1	6	6
(United States) S Korda	6	1	3
6	(United States) J Brooksby	6	6
(France) B Paire	3	1
(United States) D Kudla	2	6^{8}
(United States) M McDonald	6	7^{10}
WC	(United States) B Shelton	6	7
Q	(India) R Ramanathan	2	5

Second round
8	(United States) B Nakashima	7^{10}	6
(Australia) J Millman	6^{8}	4
Q	(Japan) T Daniel	5	4
4	(United States) F Tiafoe	7	6
6	(United States) J Brooksby	6	6
(United States) M McDonald	3	4
WC	(United States) B Shelton	6^{8}	6	6^{3}
2	(United States) J Isner	7^{10}	4	7^{7}

Quarterfinals
8	(United States) B Nakashima	4	2
4	(United States) F Tiafoe	6	6
6	(United States) J Brooksby	3	6	6
2	(United States) J Isner	6	1	4

Semifinals
4	(United States) F Tiafoe	1	4
6	(United States) J Brooksby	6	6

== Qualifying ==
=== Seeds ===
1. (France) Adrian Mannarino (qualifying competition, lucky loser)
2. (Australia) John Millman (moved to main draw)
3. (United States) Steve Johnson (qualifying competition, lucky loser)
4. (United Kingdom) Jack Draper (qualifying competition)
5. (Germany) Peter Gojowczyk (qualified)
6. (Japan) Taro Daniel (qualified)
7. (United States) Stefan Kozlov (first round)
8. (United States) J. J. Wolf (first round, retired)

=== Qualifiers ===
1. (Japan) Taro Daniel
2. (Germany) Dominik Koepfer
3. (Germany) Peter Gojowczyk
4. (India) Ramkumar Ramanathan

=== Lucky losers ===
1. (France) Adrian Mannarino
2. (United States) Steve Johnson

=== Qualifying draw ===
==== First qualifier ====
First round
1	(France) Adrian Mannarino	6	2	6
(Moldova) Radu Albot	4	6	2
(Lithuania) Ričardas Berankis	3	6^{4}
6	(Japan) Taro Daniel	6	7^{7}

Qualifying competition
1	(France) Adrian Mannarino	4	3
6	(Japan) Taro Daniel	6	6

==== Second qualifier ====
First round
Alt	(Croatia) Borna Gojo	2	5
(Germany) Dominik Koepfer	6	7
WC	(United States) Donald Young	4	6	3
8	(United States) J. J. Wolf	6	4	1^{r}

Qualifying competition
(Germany) Dominik Koepfer	6	4	6
WC	(United States) Donald Young	1	6	3

==== Third qualifier ====
First round
3	(United States) Steve Johnson	4	7^{8}	6
WC	(United States) Bruno Kuzuhara	6	6^{6}	3
(United States) Ernesto Escobedo	6	4	1
5	(Germany) Peter Gojowczyk	3	6	6

Qualifying competition
3	(United States) Steve Johnson	6^{4}	2
5	(Germany) Peter Gojowczyk	7^{7}	6

==== Fourth qualifier ====
First round
4	(United Kingdom) Jack Draper	6	5	6
(United States) Christopher Eubanks	4	7	4
Alt	(India) Ramkumar Ramanathan	6	6
7	(United States) Stefan Kozlov	0	1

Qualifying competition
4	(United Kingdom) Jack Draper	6^{6}	6	6^{2}
Alt	(India) Ramkumar Ramanathan	7^{8}	3	7^{7}
