= 2026 U.S. Men's Clay Court Championships =

- Date: March 30 – April 5
- Edition: 56th
- Category: ATP Tour 250
- Draw: 28S/16D
- Surface: Clay
- Location: Houston, Texas, United States
- Venue: River Oaks Country Club

Champions

Singles
- (United States) Tommy Paul

Doubles
- (Ecuador) Andrés Andrade / (United States) Ben Shelton
- U.S. Men's Clay Court Championships

The 2026 U.S. Men's Clay Court Championship (also known as the Fayez Sarofim & Co. U.S. Men's Clay Court Championship for sponsorship purposes) was a tennis tournament played on outdoor clay courts. It was the 56th edition of the U.S. Men's Clay Court Championships, and an ATP Tour 250 event on the 2026 ATP Tour. It took place at River Oaks Country Club in Houston, Texas, United States from March 30 through April 5, 2026.

== Champions ==
=== Singles ===
- (United States) Tommy Paul def. (Argentina) Román Andrés Burruchaga, 6–1, 3–6, 7–5

=== Doubles ===
- (Ecuador) Andrés Andrade / (United States) Ben Shelton def. (Brazil) Orlando Luz / (Brazil) Rafael Matos, 4–6, 6–3, [10–6]

== Singles main draw entrants ==
=== Seeds ===
Country	Player	Rank^{1}	Seed
USA	Ben Shelton	9	1
USA	Frances Tiafoe	20	2
USA	Learner Tien	21	3
USA	Tommy Paul	23	4
USA	Brandon Nakashima	30	5
ARG	Tomás Martín Etcheverry	32	6
USA	Alex Michelsen	40	7
USA	Jenson Brooksby	42	8

- Rankings are as of March 16, 2025.

=== Other entrants ===
The following players received wildcards into the main draw:

- (United States) Nishesh Basavareddy
- (United States) Colton Smith
- (China) Zhang Zhizhen

The following players received entry via the qualifying draw:

- (Australia) Alex Bolt
- (Canada) Liam Draxl
- (Argentina) Federico Agustín Gómez
- (United Kingdom) Jack Pinnington Jones

=== Withdrawals ===
- (United Kingdom) Jacob Fearnley → replaced by (United States) Zachary Svajda
- (Chile) Cristian Garín → replaced by (United States) Martin Damm
- (United States) Marcos Giron → replaced by (Hong Kong) Coleman Wong
- (Australia) Thanasi Kokkinakis → replaced by (United States) Patrick Kypson
- (United States) Reilly Opelka → replaced by (United States) Mackenzie McDonald
- (United States) Eliot Spizzirri → replaced by (Argentina) Román Andrés Burruchaga
- (Chile) Alejandro Tabilo → replaced by (Australia) Rinky Hijikata

== Doubles main draw entrants ==
=== Seeds ===
Country	Player	Country	Player	Rank^{1}	Seed
BRA	Orlando Luz	BRA	Rafael Matos	75	1
MEX	Santiago González	BRA	Fernando Romboli	110	2
BRA	Marcelo Demoliner	USA	Robert Galloway	118	3
USA	Evan King	USA	Reese Stalder	124	4

- Rankings are as of March 16, 2026

=== Other entrants ===
The following pairs received wildcards into the doubles main draw:

- (Ecuador) Andrés Andrade / (United States) Ben Shelton
- (United States) Nathaniel Lammons / (United States) Jackson Withrow

The following pair received entry using a protected ranking:

- (Kazakhstan) Andrey Golubev / (Kazakhstan) Aleksandr Nedovyesov
