= Ben Shelton =

American tennis player (born 2002)

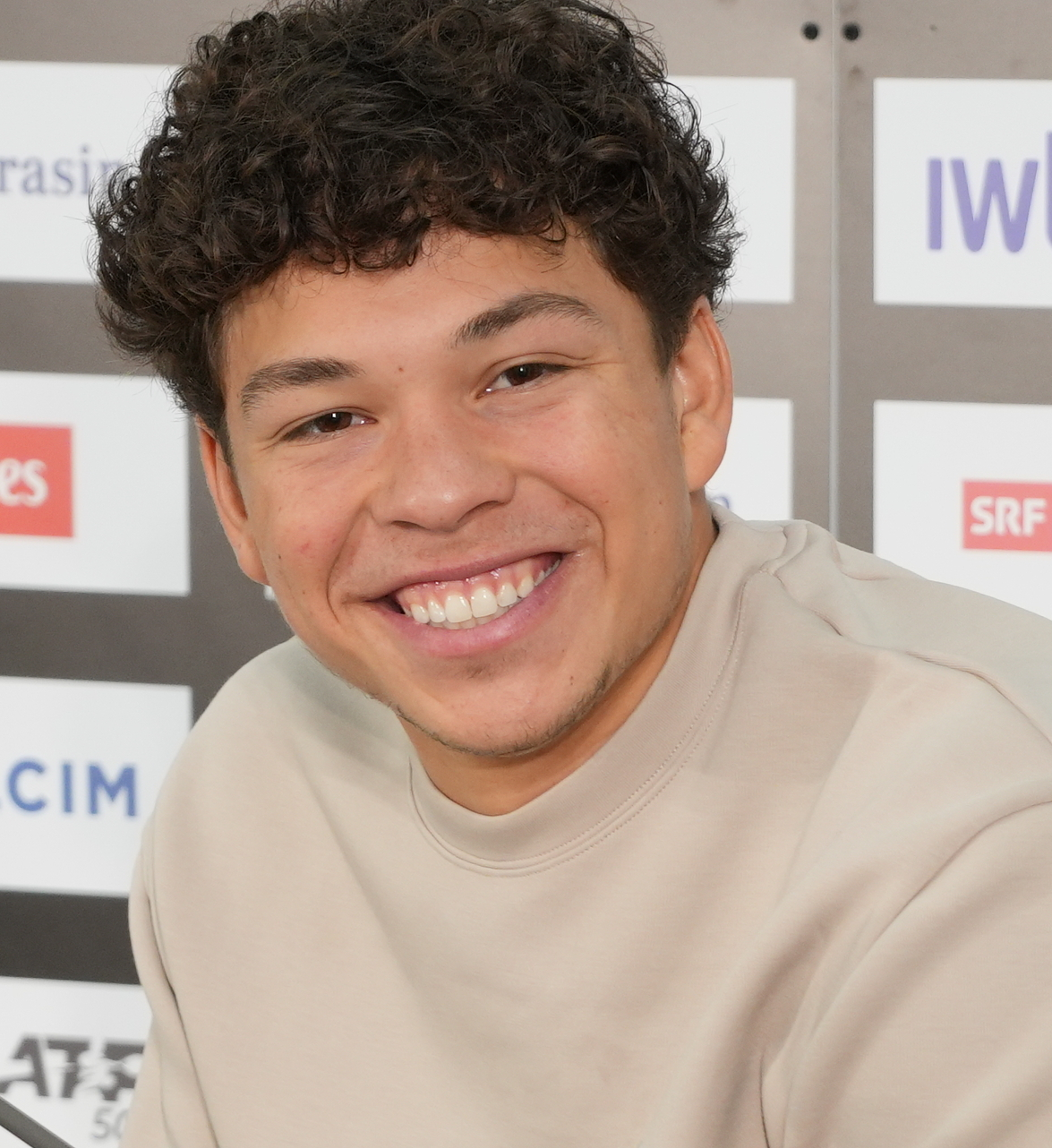
- Shelton at the 2025 Swiss Indoors
- Full name: Benjamin Todd Shelton
- Country (sports): United States
- Residence: Orlando, Florida, US
- Born: October 9, 2002 (age 24) Atlanta, Georgia, US
- Height: 6 ft 4 in (1.93 m)
- Turned pro: 2022
- Plays: Left-handed (two-handed backhand)
- College: Florida-Bachelor of Finance
- Coach: Bryan Shelton; Juan Carlos Ferrero (2027–)
- Prize money: $19,305,644: 42th all-time in earnings

Singles
- Career record: 158–98 (61.7%)
- Career titles: 7
- Highest ranking: No. 4 (September 14, 2026)
- Current ranking: No. 4 (November 9, 2026)

Grand Slam singles results
- Australian Open: SF (2025)
- French Open: 4R (2025)
- Wimbledon: QF (2025)
- US Open: F (2026)

Other tournaments
- Tour Finals: SF (2026)

Doubles
- Career record: 42–45 (48.3%)
- Career titles: 1
- Highest ranking: No. 68 (May 20, 2024)
- Current ranking: No. 156 (November 9, 2026)

Grand Slam doubles results
- Australian Open: 1R (2024)
- French Open: 2R (2023)
- Wimbledon: 2R (2024)
- US Open: 2R (2022)

Grand Slam mixed doubles results
- US Open: SF (2023)

Team competitions
- Davis Cup: QF (2024)
- Last updated on: November 21, 2026.

Benjamin Todd Shelton (born October 9, 2002) is an American professional tennis player. He is currently ranked world No. 4 in men's singles by the Association of Tennis Professionals (ATP), achieved in September 2026. Shelton has won seven ATP Tour singles titles, including two ATP Masters 1000 trophies at the Canadian Open in 2025 and 2026. His best result at the majors is reaching the final of the 2026 US Open. He is currently the American No. 1 player in singles.

In doubles, Shelton has won one title, at the 2026 U.S. Men's Clay Court Championships with Andrés Andrade, and has a career-high ranking of world No. 68, attained in May 2024.

== Early life ==
Shelton was born on October 9, 2002, in Atlanta, Georgia. Shelton is the son of former professional tennis player Bryan Shelton. His mother, Lisa Witsken Shelton, was a highly ranked junior tennis player, and his uncle, Todd Witsken, was a professional tennis player. His sister Emma played college tennis at Florida. Shelton was born in Atlanta as his father was the then-coach of Georgia Tech's women's tennis team. He grew up in Gainesville, Florida, after his father became the coach of Florida Gators men's tennis team.

Shelton played American football in his early childhood, and his parents did not pressure him to play tennis. At age 12 he began playing tennis regularly, coached by his father.

He graduated from Buchholz High School.

== Juniors ==
Shelton peaked at No. 3 in the USTA Boys' 18s division rankings. He was a runner-up at the 2020 USTA Boys 18s Winter Nationals and won the 2019 USTA Boys 16s tournament in doubles.

Shelton had mixed results on the ITF junior circuit and reached a junior combined ranking of No. 306 in December 2020.

== College years ==
From 2020 to 2022, he played collegiate tennis for the Florida Gators. A finance major, Shelton mostly played No. 5 singles as a freshman in 2020–21 and had an overall record of 28–5. He helped the Gators win the Southeastern Conference (SEC) regular season title, and he won the championship-clinching match at the 2021 NCAA Championships, securing Florida's first national title.

In 2021–22, Shelton had a record of 37–5 in singles matches (including 14–2 in the No. 1 spot). He won the Intercollegiate Tennis Association (ITA) All-American Championships in the fall without dropping a set. He helped Florida defend their SEC title and win the SEC Tournament Championship. Shelton won the 2022 NCAA Singles Championship over August Holmgren and finished the season as the nation's top-ranked player. He was named SEC Player of the Year and National Player of the Year.

Shelton returned to Florida for his junior year in 2022–23 to complete his finance degree, but soon continued his college education online.

== Professional career ==
=== 2022: ATP debut, Challenger titles, Top 5 win ===
At the Georgia's Rome Challenger in July, Shelton reached his first Challenger final, losing to Wu Yibing. The next week at the Indy Challenger, he reached the semi-finals, highlighted by a win over world No. 103 Tim van Rijthoven.

Shelton made his ATP Tour debut at the Atlanta Open as a wildcard, and in the first round he defeated Ramkumar Ramanathan for his first ATP win. He lost his next match to the No. 2 seed John Isner in three sets. Shelton received a wildcard entry into the Cincinnati Masters. In the first round, he defeated world No. 56 Lorenzo Sonego in three sets for his first win over a top-100 player. In the 2nd round, Shelton faced world No. 5 Casper Ruud in his first matchup against a top-10 opponent. Shelton defeated Ruud, in straight sets for his first top-10 win.

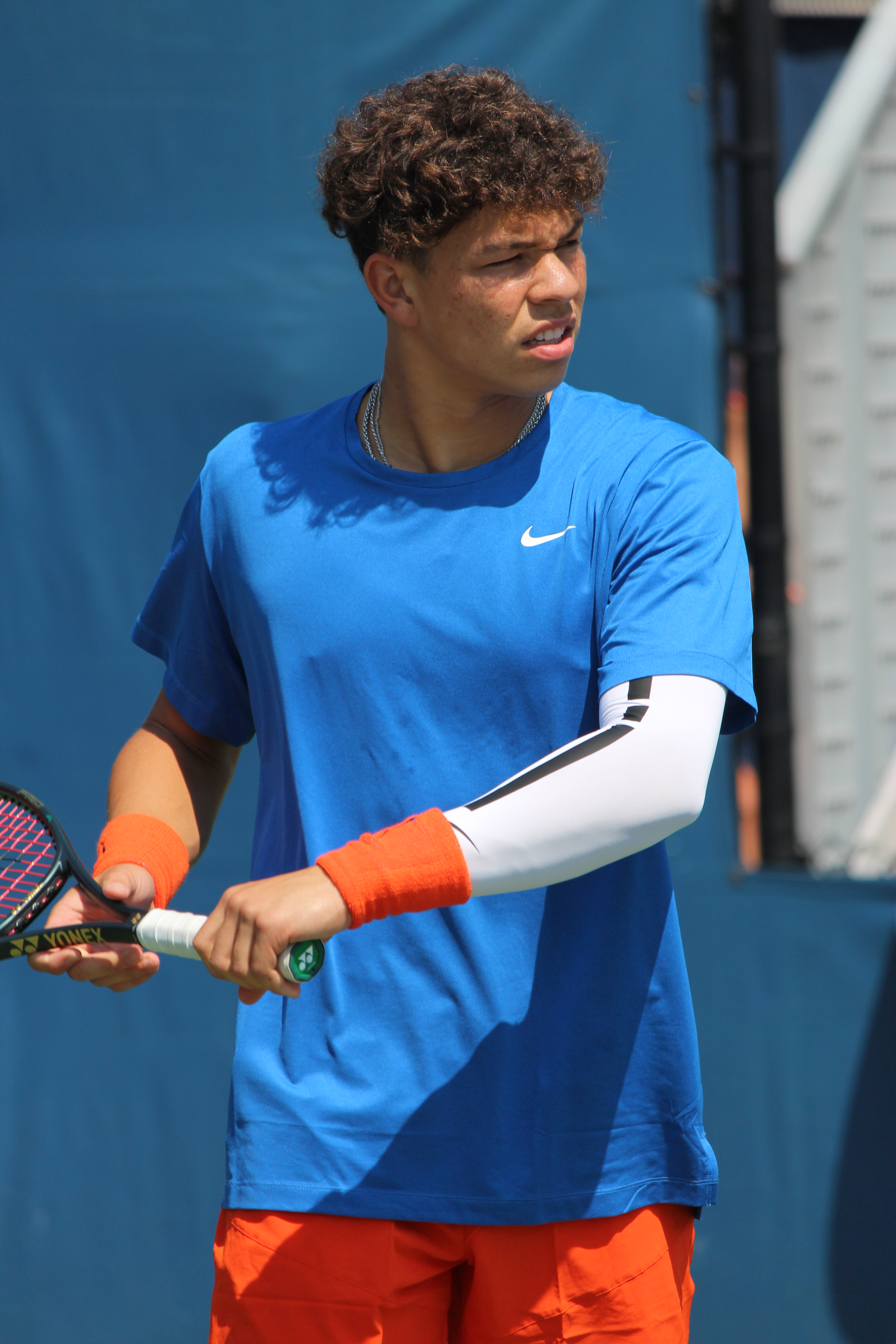
Shelton at the 2022 US Open

On August 23, 2022, Shelton announced he would not return to college and would turn professional. He announced that he would be represented by agent Alessandro Sant Albano, who is a part of Roger Federer's TEAM8 management firm.

Shelton also received a wildcard to appear in the main draw for his Grand Slam debut at the US Open on August 14. He lost in the first round, in five sets, to Nuno Borges while also recording the second fastest serve of the US Open tournament at 149 miles per hour (240 km/h) in this match. He also competed in doubles having paired with fellow American Christopher Eubanks. They were eliminated in the second round after defeating Stefanos Tsitsipas and Petros Tsitsipas in the first round.

Shelton reached his third Challenger final of the year at the 2022 Tiburon Challenger after defeating top seed Denis Kudla. As a result, he moved into the top 160 in the rankings on October 10, 2022. He advanced to his fourth Challenger final at the Charlottesville Men's Pro Challenger where he defeated his doubles partner Christopher Eubanks to secure his first Challenger title. As a result, he moved into the top 150 in the rankings at world No. 128 on November 7.

His fifth Challenger final featured a repeat of his last with a win against Christopher Eubanks in the Knoxville Challenger which lifted him another 20 positions up to No. 108 in the rankings on November 14. After winning his third straight title at the Champaign–Urbana Challenger, he debuted in the top 100 of the rankings ending the year at world No. 97 on November 21, 2022, and became the youngest player in ATP Challenger Tour history to win three titles in three weeks. He was also the youngest American in the Top 250.

=== 2023: First Major semifinal, first ATP title, top 15 ===
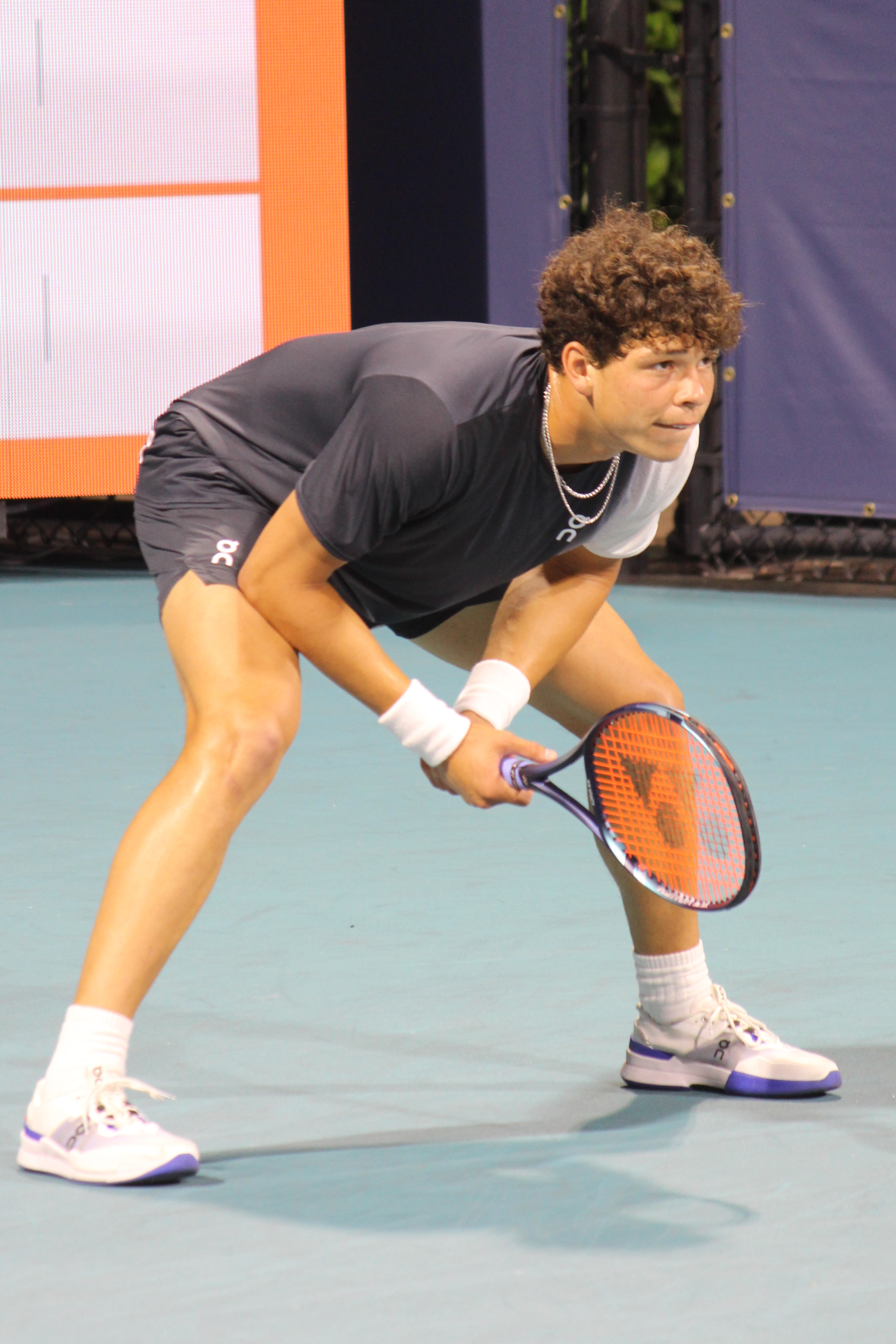
Shelton at the 2023 Miami Open

On his debut at the 2023 Australian Open, Shelton reached the fourth round, with wins against Zhang Zhizhen, Nicolas Jarry, and Alexei Popyrin. This was only Shelton's second Grand Slam after the 2022 US Open. Next he defeated compatriot J. J. Wolf to reach the quarterfinal of a Major for the first time in his career. His run concluded with a four-set loss to fellow American Tommy Paul. As a result, he moved 53 positions up into the top 50, at world No. 44, for the first time in his career.

In the beginning of the American hard court season for 2023, Shelton faced a tough start, experiencing defeat in the opening round at the 2023 Delray Beach Open, losing in straight sets to Marcos Giron. His struggles continued at the Mexican Open, where he once again fell in the first round, this time to the fourth-seeded Holger Rune, in a match that stretched to three sets. However, Shelton managed to bounce back at Indian Wells, securing a victory over Fabio Fognini in the initial round, only to be bested by fellow American Taylor Fritz in the second round.

At the 2023 US Open Shelton made it to his first Grand Slam semifinal, where he lost in straight sets to second seed and eventual champion Novak Djokovic. As a result, he reached the top 20 in the rankings at world No. 19 on September 11, 2023.

At the 2023 Rolex Shanghai Masters he reached the quarterfinals of a Masters 1000 for the first time defeating fourth seed Jannik Sinner for the second biggest win of his career. He reached his maiden final and won his maiden title at the 2023 Japan Open Tennis Championships defeating qualifier Taro Daniel, Jordan Thompson, fifth seed Tommy Paul, qualifier Marcos Giron and Aslan Karatsev. He became the sixth first-time ATP champion in the season and as a result reached the top 15 in the singles rankings on October 23, 2023.

=== 2024: First title on clay, American No. 1 ===
At the U.S. Clay Court Championships he reached his first quarterfinal on clay courts defeating Zizou Bergs, and his first semifinal defeating compatriot Brandon Nakashima. Next he defeated fourth seed Tomás Martín Etcheverry to reach his first clay court final. He won his second career title and first on clay becoming the youngest champion since Andy Roddick in 2002, defeating third seed Frances Tiafoe in the first African-American men's singles tennis final in the Open Era. As a result, he reached a new career-high singles ranking of world No. 14 on 8 April 2024, and became the American No. 1 player ahead of Taylor Fritz a week later. He became the youngest American No. 1 player since Andy Roddick achieved the feat in March 2004. Shelton would go on to reach a new ranking of world No. 13 on 19 August 2024.

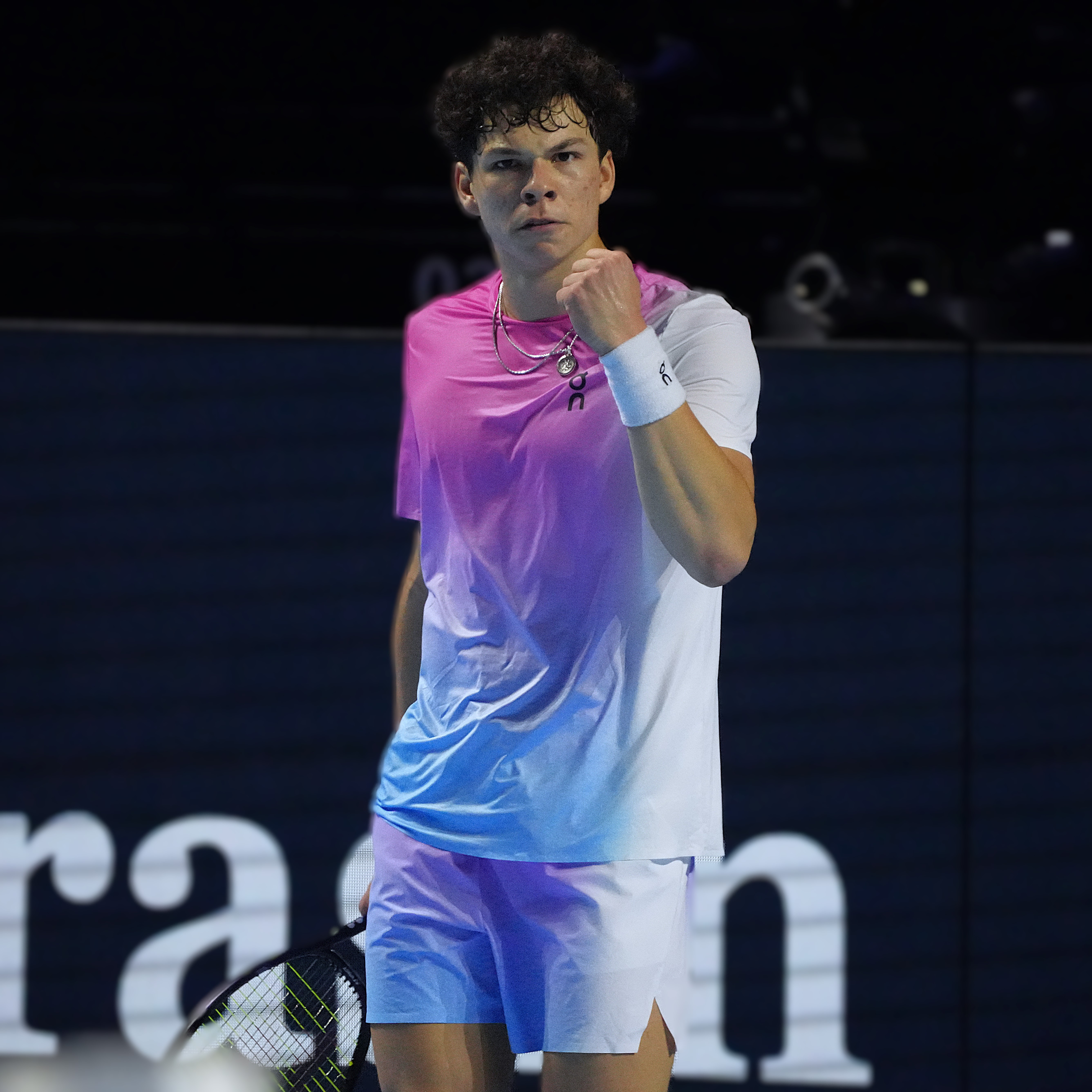
Ben Shelton, ATP Basel 2024

At the Cincinnati Open he reached the round of 16 for the second time at the tournament, saving a match point against Tomás Martín Etcheverry. he reached his second Masters career quarterfinal with a win over Fábián Marozsán. Shelton reached the third round of the US Open, defeating former 2020 champion Dominic Thiem in his final US Open, and Roberto Carballes Baena in the second round, before losing to eventual semifinalist Francis Tiafoe in a repeat of the previous year's quarter-final.

At the 2024 Laver Cup, Shelton earned 6 of Team World's 11 points in a 13–11 loss to Team Europe. On day one, Shelton partnered Taylor Fritz to defeat Alexander Zverev and Carlos Alcaraz of Team Europe. On day 2, Shelton was defeated by Alcaraz in singles, while partnering with Alejandro Tabilo to defeat the doubles team of Casper Ruud and Stefanos Tsitsipas. On the third day, Shelton defeated Daniil Medvedev, before losing to the doubles team of Alcaraz and Ruud. Shelton played a total of 5 matches, more than any other Laver Cup participant, and earned 6 points, more than anyone on Team World.

Shelton defeated Ugo Humbert in four quarters to win his maiden UTS title in Frankfurt. Shelton reached the final of the Swiss Indoors in October, but was defeated by Giovanni Mpetshi Perricard. On his way to the final, Shelton defeated, among others, Arthur Fils in the semifinals.

=== 2025: World No. 5, Masters title, ATP Finals debut ===
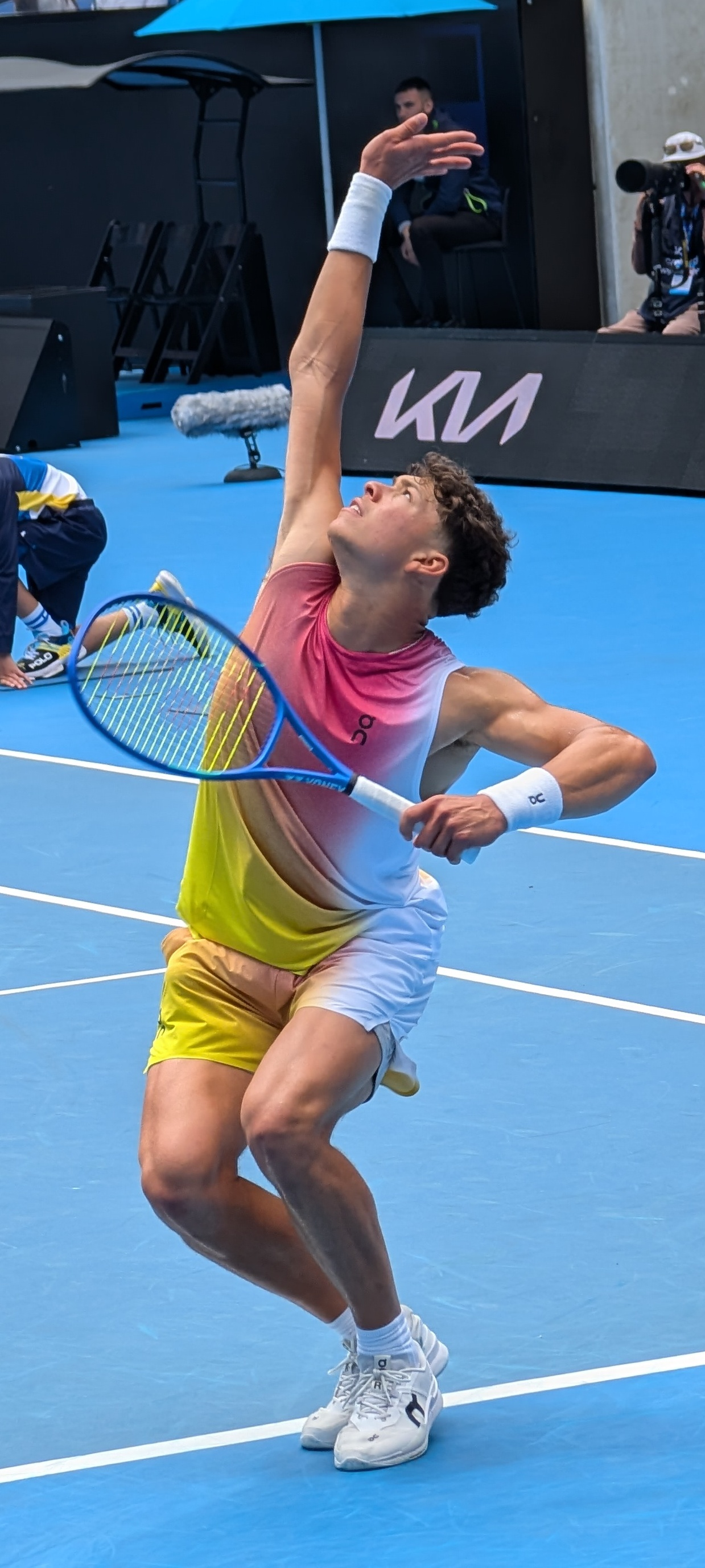
Shelton at the 2025 Australian Open

Shelton, seeded first at the Auckland Open lost to Jakub Menšík in the round of 16. In the Australian Open, Shelton advanced past the first week after defeating compatriot Brandon Nakashima in straight sets in round 1, Pablo Carreño Busta in round 2, Lorenzo Musetti in round 3, and advanced past Gaël Monfils after the Frenchman retired in the fourth set due to injury. In the quarterfinals, Shelton defeated Lorenzo Sonego in four sets. In his final match of the tournament, Shelton lost to defending champion Jannik Sinner in the semifinals in three sets.

At the Indian Wells Open, Shelton reached the quarterfinals for the first time at the tournament becoming the youngest American to accomplish the feat since Andy Roddick in 2004. Shelton made his top 10 debut following his quarterfinal win over Jiří Lehečka at the Stuttgart Open. He lost in the semifinals to top seed and eventual champion Alexander Zverev. By reaching the quarterfinals at the Washington Open, Shelton secured a new career high ranking of world No. 7 on July 28, 2025. He defeated hometown favorite and sixth seed Frances Tiafoe to reach a consecutive semifinal in Washington, the third American to accomplish the feat.

He reached his first ATP 1000 semifinal at the Canadian Open, defeating Flavio Cobolli en route and recording his 100th career win, and Alex de Minaur. He became the youngest American to reach the last four at an ATP 1000, since Andy Roddick in 2005 in Indian Wells. He defeated Karen Khachanov in the final in three sets to win his third career title, first ATP Masters title, and a new ranking of world No. 6.

At the 2025 Cincinnati Open, Shelton made it to the quarterfinals after beating Camilo Ugo Carabelli, Roberto Bautista Agut, and Jiří Lehečka all in straight sets, before losing to Alexander Zverev in straight sets. At the Paris Masters, Shelton defeated Andrey Rublev to reach the quarterfinals. In doing so, Shelton rose to a new career high ranking of world No. 5 in November and qualified for the ATP Finals, marking his debut appearance.

=== 2026: World No. 4, First Major Final ===
Starting his season at the ASB Classic, Shelton reached the quarterfinals where he lost against Sebastián Báez. He made another quarterfinal run at the Australian Open, defeating Ugo Humbert in the first round. In the fourth round, he defeated Casper Ruud before losing to two-time defending champion Jannik Sinner.

In February, Shelton won his fourth career title and first title of the season at Dallas Open, with wins against defending champion Denis Shapovalov and after saving 3 championship points in the final against Taylor Fritz.

At the US Men's Clay Court Championship Shelton lifted his first ATP doubles title with his University of Florida men's tennis college teammate Andrés Andrade. In singles he once again became the American No. 1 player in the ATP Rankings on 6 April 2026.

Ben Shelton won the BMW Open in Munich defeating Flavio Cobolli. It was his fifth career ATP Tour title, first on European clay, and made history as the first American man to win a title on clay at the ATP 500 level or higher since Andre Agassi at the 2002 Italian Open.

For the first time in 71 years, two American men faced off in the Stuttgart Open final. During the tournament, Shelton went three sets in each match, saved nine break points, and two match points en route to the title. In defeating Taylor Fritz to win the Boss Open 250 event, Shelton claimed his first grass title and became the sixth American champion of the event. Shelton also became the first American male since 2010 and fourth male player during the 2020s, to win titles on all three surfaces in the same year (hard, clay, and grass).

At Wimbledon, for the first time at a major since the 2023 French Open, Shelton lost in the first round to qualifier Otto Virtanen, despite having a match point in the 5th set tiebreak.

Shelton successfully defended his title at the Canadian Open, highlighted by wins over João Fonseca and Jakub Menšík. He became the first player to go back to back at this tournament since Rafael Nadal in 2018–2019, first player to win without dropping a set since Novak Djokovic in 2016, and eighth player in history to win titles on every surface (outdoor hard, indoor hard, clay and grass) within the same season.

Shelton made his first Grand Slam final at the 2026 US Open, losing in four sets to Alexander Zverev.

== National representation ==
=== Davis Cup ===
Shelton made his Davis Cup debut in the quarterfinals of the 2024 Davis Cup Finals against Australia. Shelton lost his singles match to Thanasi Kokkinakis after failing to convert four match points, and lost his doubles match partnered with Tommy Paul to Matthew Ebden and Jordan Thompson. He was announced as part of the team for the 2025 Davis Cup Qualifiers second round, but withdrew due to a shoulder injury.

== Endorsements and media ==
As of March 2023, Shelton is sponsored by On for clothing and shoes and Yonex for racquets. On January 14, 2024, Shelton announced his partnership with Rolex. He has also appeared in advertising campaigns for Loewe, Ralph Lauren, Thorne Health and Bose.

Shelton was featured in the second season of the Netflix documentary series Break Point in 2024. In December 2025, Shelton launched his YouTube channel with a new docuseries titled The Long Game.

== Playing style ==
Shelton is able to hit a big first serve, which averages 126 miles per hour (203 km/h). At the 2023 US Open, he hit two service aces at 149.0 miles per hour (239.8 km/h) in the same game; he has hit serves at 150.0 miles per hour (241.4 km/h) on multiple separate occasions. He also can produce a significant amount of kick on both first and second serves. A left-handed player, Shelton is powerful and consistent on the forehand and backhand side.

He is comfortable moving to the net off his powerful groundstrokes to finish points. Shelton has said "I love to get to net, be able to use some of my hand skills, athletic skills and going up to get the ball (to put away overheads) is one of my favorite things to do..." He has said that the serve-and-volley is an important part of his game and an area he wants to further develop.

Shelton's preferred court is the hard court but he has achieved success on clay, being the first American to win an ATP 500 or above clay court title since 2002.

Shelton's serve is not his only ability, as he's developed a wider variety of shots to use within his games after some criticisms that he relied too heavily on his serve. He is now able to sustain longer rallies, utilizing his stamina rather than aiming for quick winners.

He is coached by his father Bryan Shelton as of June 2023, and formerly Dean Goldfine. His tennis idol is Roger Federer.

== Personal life ==
Shelton is based in Orlando, Florida. He was in a relationship with heptathlete Anna Hall from 2021 to 2023. Shelton went public with his relationship with soccer player Trinity Rodman in March 2025.

A fan of soccer player Michael Olise, Shelton has recreated Olise's trademark goal celebration at the 2025 Munich Open.

== Career statistics ==
Key
W	F	SF	QF	#R	RR	Q#	DNQ	A	NH

(W) winner; (F) finalist; (SF) semifinalist; (QF) quarterfinalist; (#R) rounds 4, 3, 2, 1; (RR) round-robin stage; (Q#) qualification round; (DNQ) did not qualify; (A) absent; (NH) not held; (SR) strike rate (events won / competed); (W–L) win–loss record.
To avoid confusion and double counting, these charts are updated at the conclusion of a tournament or when the player's participation has ended.

=== Singles ===
Current through the 2026 US Open.

Tournament	2021	2022	2023	2024	2025	2026	SR	W–L	Win %
Grand Slam tournaments
Australian Open	A	A	QF	3R	SF	QF	0 / 4	15–4	79%
French Open	A	A	1R	3R	4R (Note: Shelton received a walkover in the second round, which does not count as a win.)	2R	0 / 4	5–4	56%
Wimbledon	A	A	2R	4R	QF	1R	0 / 4	8–4	67%
US Open	Q2	1R	SF	3R	3R	F	0 / 5	15–5	75%
Win–loss	0–0	0–1	10–4	9–4	13–4	11–4	0 / 17	43–17	72%

=== Grand Slam tournaments ===
==== Singles: 1 (1 runner-up) ====
Result	Year	Tournament	Surface	Opponent	Score
Loss	2026	US Open	Hard	(Germany) Alexander Zverev	3–6, 6–7^{(2–7)}, 7–5, 2–6

=== ATP 1000 tournaments ===
==== Singles: 3 (2 titles, 1 runner-up) ====
Result	Year	Tournament	Surface	Opponent	Score
Win	2025	Canadian Open	Hard	(Note: Russian and Belarus players are not allowed to compete under the name or flag of their country following the Russian invasion of Ukraine.) Karen Khachanov	6–7^{(5–7)}, 6–4, 7–6^{(7–3)}
Win	2026	Canadian Open (2)	Hard	(United States) Brandon Nakashima	6–3, 7–6^{(7–4)}
Loss	2026	Paris Masters	Hard (i)	(Spain) Carlos Alcaraz	6–7^{(5–7)}, 5–7

== Notes ==
Sporting positions
Preceded by (France) Valentin Vacherot	SEC Tennis Player of the Year; 2022	Succeeded by (United Kingdom) Johannus Monday
