= Tommy Paul (tennis) =

American tennis player (born 1997)

- Paul in 2017
- Country (sports): United States
- Residence: Boca Raton, Florida, US
- Born: May 17, 1997 (age 29) Voorhees Township, New Jersey, US
- Height: 6 ft 1 in (1.85 m)
- Turned pro: 2015
- Plays: Right-handed (two-handed backhand)
- Coach: Brad Stine, Hugo Armando
- Prize money: US $16,914,358

Singles
- Career record: 241–154
- Career titles: 5
- Highest ranking: No. 8 (June 9, 2025)
- Current ranking: No. 13 (November 9, 2026)

Grand Slam singles results
- Australian Open: SF (2023)
- French Open: QF (2025)
- Wimbledon: QF (2024)
- US Open: 4R (2023, 2024, 2026)

Other tournaments
- Olympic Games: QF (2024)

Doubles
- Career record: 39–53
- Career titles: 0
- Highest ranking: No. 97 (September 12, 2022)
- Current ranking: No. 1,355 (August 31, 2026)

Grand Slam doubles results
- Australian Open: 2R (2021)
- French Open: QF (2020)
- Wimbledon: 2R (2022)
- US Open: 2R (2016)

Other doubles tournaments
- Olympic Games: Bronze (2024)

Grand Slam mixed doubles results
- US Open: QF (2026)

Team competitions
- Davis Cup: QF (2022)
Olympic medal record
Men's tennis
Representing United States
Olympic Games
Bronze medal – third place	2024 Paris	Doubles
- Last updated on: August 31, 2026.

Thomas John Robert Paul (born May 17, 1997) is an American professional tennis player. He reached an Association of Tennis Professionals singles ranking of world No. 8 on June 9, 2025, and a doubles ranking of No. 97 on September 12, 2022. He is currently the No. 4 American singles player.

Paul has won five ATP Tour singles titles, and reached a major semifinal at the 2023 Australian Open. He also won a bronze medal at the 2024 Paris Olympics in men's doubles, partnering with Taylor Fritz.

== Junior career ==
Paul was consistently one of the highest ranked juniors of his class. Paul reached a career-high ITF junior rank of No. 3 on September 14, 2015.

Paul reached two junior Grand Slam finals in 2015. He won the 2015 French Open boys' singles title by defeating fellow American Taylor Fritz in the final in three sets. At the same tournament he reached the final in doubles partnering fellow American William Blumberg. He also reached the final at the 2015 US Open boys' singles, this time losing to Fritz in three sets.

== Professional career ==
=== 2015: Major debut ===
Paul turned pro in 2015. Although unusual for an American male, Paul has shown a preference for playing on clay, having won the Junior French Open and his first five ITF Futures singles titles on clay. Paul was just the second American boy to win the French Open since John McEnroe in 1977, twenty years before Paul was born. He qualified for the main draw of a major for the first time at the 2015 US Open, losing to Andreas Seppi in the first round.

=== 2016: Top 200, ATP match win ===
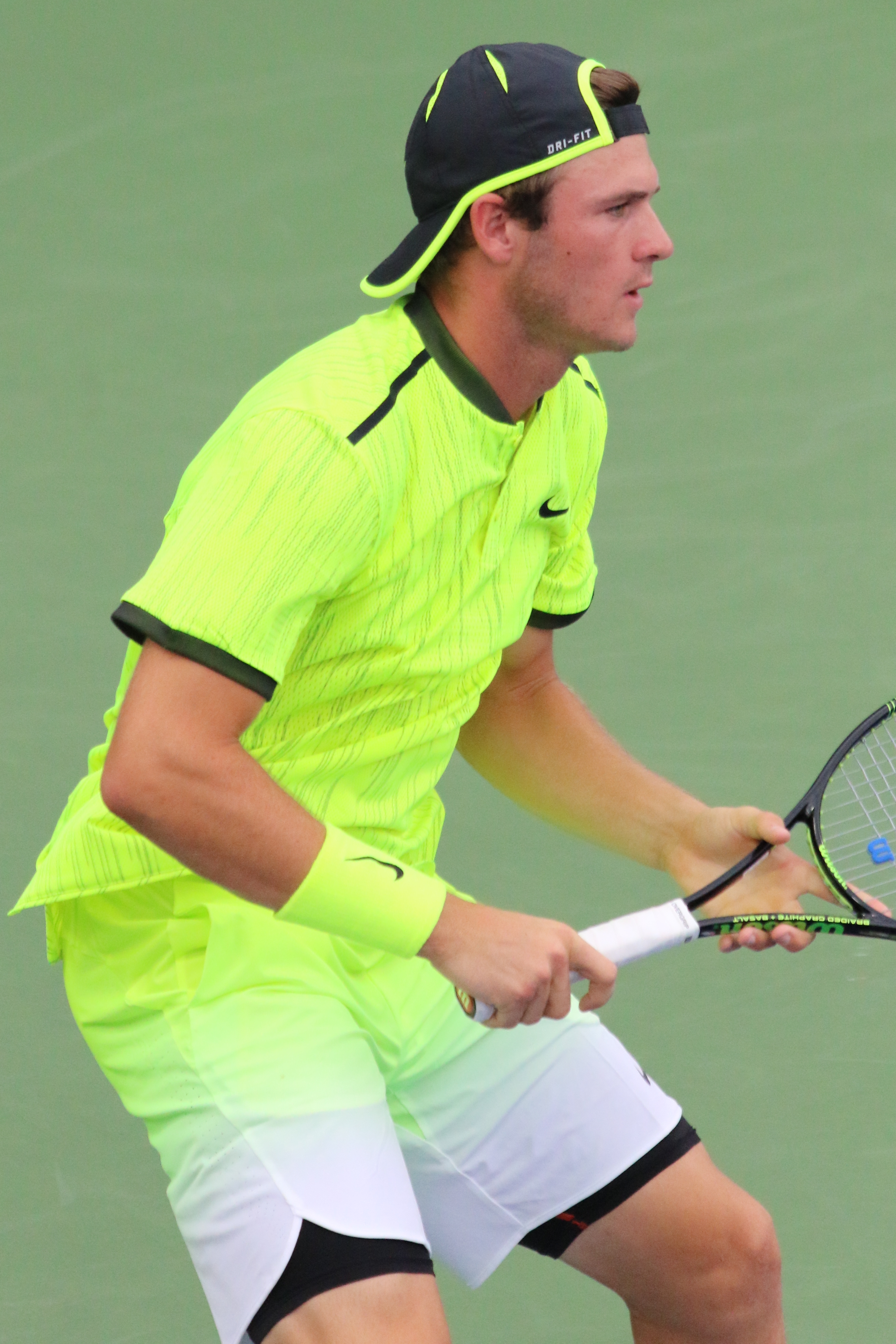
Paul at the 2016 US Open

In March 2016, Paul cracked the top 200 for the first time by qualifying for the Miami Masters. In April, Paul was awarded a wild card into the 2016 U.S. Men's Clay Court Championships at Houston, and defeated 53rd-ranked Paolo Lorenzi in the first round for his first career ATP level win.

Paul would then mainly compete on the ATP Challenger Tour and ITF Circuit for the remainder of 2016.

=== 2017: First ATP 500 quarterfinal ===
He continued competing in Challengers and ITFs in first half of 2017. In July 2017, after going through qualifying at the Atlanta Open, he defeated seventh seed and 53rd-ranked Chung Hyeon in three sets. He then went on to defeat Malek Jaziri in three sets to advance to his first ATP Tour-level quarterfinal. Then he was defeated by third seed Gilles Müller. Following his performance in Atlanta, Tommy was awarded a wild card into the ATP 500 Washington Open. Paul defeated Casper Ruud to advance to the second round. He then played Lucas Pouille and achieved the biggest win of his career, defeating the Frenchman in straight sets. In the next round, he faced Gilles Müller again, but this time came out on top in three sets to reach his first ATP 500 quarterfinal. He lost to Kei Nishikori in three sets.

=== 2019: Top 100 debut ===
In September, Paul broke into the top 100 for the first time in his career having won his second ATP Challenger title of the year in New Haven, after winning in Sarasota earlier in the season.

=== 2020: Australian 3rd round, doubles quarterfinals ===
Paul started his season at the first edition of the Adelaide International. Getting past qualifying, he reached the semifinals where he lost to fellow qualifier Lloyd Harris. Ranked No. 80 at the Australian Open, Paul reached the third round of a Grand Slam for the first time in his career by beating 18th seed and world No. 20, Grigor Dimitrov, in the second round. He was defeated in the third round by Márton Fucsovics.

=== 2021: Top 50, first ATP title ===
Paul started his 2021 season at the Delray Beach Open. Seeded fifth, he lost in the second round to compatriot and eventual finalist, Sebastian Korda. Seeded 15th at the Murray River Open, he was defeated in the second round by Australian Alexei Popyrin. Ranked No. 53 at the Australian Open, he lost in the second round to 24th seed Casper Ruud.

In March, Paul competed at the Rotterdam Open. He reached the quarterfinals where he fell to qualifier and eventual finalist, Márton Fucsovics. At the Abierto Mexicano in Acapulco, he was eliminated in the first round by fourth seed Milos Raonic. In Miami, he was beaten in the first round by Marcos Giron.

Paul started his clay-court season at the Sardegna Open. Seeded eighth, he lost in the first round to Yannick Hanfmann. At the Monte-Carlo Masters, he was defeated in the second round by ninth seed Roberto Bautista Agut. In Madrid, he was ousted from the tournament in the second round by sixth seed and world No. 7, Andrey Rublev. Getting past qualifying at the Italian Open, he lost in the first round to tenth seed Roberto Bautista Agut. At the Lyon Open, he was defeated in the second round by second seed, world No. 5, and eventual champion, Stefanos Tsitsipas. Seeded sixth at the first edition of the Emilia-Romagna Open in Parma, Italy, he reached the semifinals where he lost to Sebastian Korda. Ranked 52 at the French Open, he beat Christopher O'Connell in a first-round five-set thriller before he lost in the second round to world No. 2, Daniil Medvedev. As a result, he entered the top 50 on June 14, 2021.

Paul missed the grass-court season due to a foot injury.

Paul qualified to represent the United States at the 2020 Tokyo Olympics. He lost in the first round to 11th seed Aslan Karatsev of Russia.

Paul started his US Open Series at the Washington Open and lost in the first round to Daniel Elahi Galán. Getting past qualifying at the Canadian Open in Toronto, he was defeated in the second round by tenth seed Roberto Bautista Agut. Making it through qualifying at the Western & Southern Open in Cincinnati, he beat 16th seed, Cristian Garín, in the first round. He was eliminated in the second round by Lorenzo Sonego. Ranked 54 at the US Open, he lost in the first round to Roberto Carballés Baena in four sets.

During the week of September 27, Paul competed at the San Diego Open. He lost in the first round to Sebastian Korda. At the Indian Wells Masters, he recorded one of the biggest wins of his career, defeating fourth seed and world No. 5, Andrey Rublev, to reach the round of 16. Previously, he had never made the third round of an ATP Masters 1000 event. This was his second win against a top 10 opponent after he defeated Alexander Zverev in Acapulco in 2020. He was beaten in the fourth round by 21st seed and eventual champion, Cam Norrie. At the Kremlin Cup in Moscow, he lost in the second round to sixth seed and eventual finalist, Marin Čilić. In St. Petersburg, he was defeated in the second round by fifth seed and eventual finalist, Taylor Fritz. Getting past qualifying at the Paris Masters, he lost in the second round to seventh seed and world No. 10, Hubert Hurkacz. Paul played his final tournament of the season at the Stockholm Open. He reached the first ATP final of his career, defeating fifth seed, Taylor Fritz, in the second round, former world No. 1 and three-time Grand Slam champion, Andy Murray, in the quarterfinals, and eighth seed, Frances Tiafoe, in the semifinals. He won the title, defeating third seed and defending champion, Denis Shapovalov. He became the 10th first-time titleist of the year.

Paul ended the year ranked No. 43.

=== 2022: Two top 3 wins, Wimbledon fourth round ===
Paul started his 2022 season at the Adelaide International 1. Seeded sixth, he reached the quarterfinals where he lost to top seed and eventual champion, Gaël Monfils. At the Adelaide International 2, he made it to the quarterfinals where he was defeated by fourth seed Marin Čilić. Ranked No. 41 at the Australian Open, he was eliminated in the second round by Miomir Kecmanović.

Seeded fourth at the Delray Beach Open, Paul reached the semifinals where he fell to top seed Cam Norrie. At the Abierto Mexicano in Acapulco, he won his first-round match when his opponent, world No. 6 and fifth seed Matteo Berrettini, retired due to injury. He was beaten in the quarterfinals by fourth seed, former world No. 1, three-time champion, and eventual champion, Rafael Nadal. Representing the U.S. in the Davis Cup tie against Colombia, Paul played one match and won over Nicolás Mejía. In the end, the USA beat Colombia 4–0 to make up for Colombia beating them last year. At the Indian Wells Masters, he upset world No. 3, Alexander Zverev, in the second round for the biggest win of his career to reach the third round for a second time. He lost in the third round to 29th seed Alex de Minaur. The following week at the Miami Open, he defeated 23rd seed, Karen Khachanov, in the second round to reach the third round for the first time. He was ousted from the tournament in the third round by 11th seed Taylor Fritz. As a result, he reached the top 35 at world No. 34 on April 4, 2022.

Paul started his clay-court season at the U.S. Men's Clay Court Championships in Houston. Seeded seventh, he lost in the second round to Nick Kyrgios. Seeded seventh at the Estoril Open, he was defeated in the first round by 2015 champion Richard Gasquet. In Madrid, he lost in the first round to 10th seed, Jannik Sinner, in a tight three-set match, despite having match points at 5–3 and 6–5 in the second set. At the Italian Open, he was beaten in the second round by Alex de Minaur. Seeded sixth at the Geneva Open, he lost in the first round to Tallon Griekspoor. Seeded 30th at the French Open, he was defeated in the first round by Cristian Garín.

Paul began his grass-court season at the Rosmalen Open in 's-Hertogenbosch. Seeded seventh, he lost in the first round to compatriot Brandon Nakashima in a match that consisted of three tiebreakers. In Queens, he beat sixth seed, Denis Shapovalov, in the first round. In the second round, he defeated three-time Grand Slam champion and former world No. 3, Stan Wawrinka. In the quarterfinals, he lost to second seed, world No. 10, defending champion, and eventual champion, Matteo Berrettini. At the Eastbourne International, he upset second seed and world No. 13, Jannik Sinner, in the second round. He was beaten in the quarterfinals by sixth seed, world No. 24, and defending champion, Alex de Minaur. Seeded 30th at Wimbledon, he defeated Jiří Veselý in the third round to reach the fourth round of a Grand Slam for the first time in his career. He lost in the fourth round to ninth seed, world No. 12, and home crowd favorite, Cameron Norrie.

Paul started his preparation for the US Open at the Atlanta Open. Seeded fifth, he reached the quarterfinals where he lost to Ilya Ivashka. Seeded 14th at the Washington Open, he was defeated in the second round by 2019 champion and eventual champion, Nick Kyrgios. At the Canadian Open, he stunned second seed and world No. 4, Carlos Alcaraz, in the second round, the third top-5 win of his career. He reached the quarterfinals of a Masters 1000 for the first time in his career after defeating 13th seed, Marin Čilić, in the third round. He lost in the quarterfinals to Dan Evans in three sets. Despite the loss, he reached a new career-high of world No. 31 on 15 August 2022. At the Western & Southern Open in Cincinnati, he lost in the second round to Denis Shapovalov in three sets. Seeded 29th at the 2022 US Open, he reached the third round for the first time at this Major after defeating Bernabé Zapata Miralles and compatriot Sebastian Korda both in five sets matches, the latter lasting over three hours. He lost to 5th seed and eventual finalist Casper Ruud in a third consecutive five set match lasting almost four hours and half hours.

He recorded the biggest win of his career defeating world No. 2 Rafael Nadal in the second round the 2022 Rolex Paris Masters, his fourth Top-10 victory of the year, recovering from a set and a break down and denying him the No. 1 bid. He went on to defeat Pablo Carreño Busta to reach the quarterfinals for the first time at this tournament, having defeated three Spaniards in a row, including Roberto Bautista Agut in the first round.

Paul ended the year ranked No. 33.

=== 2023: Major semifinal, win over world No. 1 ===
Paul reached his first Grand Slam semifinal at the 2023 Australian Open. On his way Paul defeated Jan-Lennard Struff, 30th seed Alejandro Davidovich Fokina, Jenson Brooksby, and 24th seed Roberto Bautista Agut. He then defeated fellow American Ben Shelton to reach the semifinals, becoming the first American male player to do so at this Major since Andy Roddick in 2009. He was defeated by eventual champion Novak Djokovic in the semifinals. As a result, he reached the top 20 at world No. 19 on 30 January 2023.

He reached his second and biggest career final at the ATP 500 2023 Mexican Open defeating three Americans; Michael Mmoh in the second round for his 100th match career win, Mackenzie McDonald in the quarterfinals and third seed Taylor Fritz in an epic match lasting three and a half hours, setting the record for the longest match in the 30-year history of the tournament. He lost to Alex de Minaur in the final.

At the Canadian Open he reached back to back quarterfinals at this tournament, defeating qualifier Marcos Giron. Next he defeated again world No. 1 Carlos Alcaraz, whom he defeated the previous year at this same tournament, to reach his first Masters 1000 semifinal. At the US Open he reached the fourth round at this Major for the first time defeating 21st seed Alejandro Davidovich Fokina. As a result, he reached world No. 12 in the singles rankings on October 2, 2023. At the 2023 Rolex Shanghai Masters he reached also the fourth round defeating Arthur Fils.

=== 2024: American No. 1, Olympic bronze ===
He reached his fourth ATP career final and won his second title at the 2024 Dallas Open defeating Taro Daniel, eight seed Dominik Koepfer, third seed Ben Shelton, and Marcos Giron. He reached back-to-back finals at the 2024 Delray Beach Open defeating second seed Frances Tiafoe.

Having never been past the fourth round at the Indian Wells Open, he reached the semifinals at this tournament for the first time and only the second in his career at this level, with wins over fellow American Alex Michelsen, 14th seed Ugo Humbert, lucky loser Luca Nardi and ninth seed Casper Ruud. At the 2024 Miami Open he lost in the second round to wild card Martin Damm Jr. after retiring with an injury, having received a bye at the tournament.

At the next Masters, the Italian Open, he reached the semifinals for the first time at this tournament, having never advanced past the second round previously. He defeated Aslan Karatsev, Dominik Koepfer, second seed and defending champion and world No. 4 Daniil Medvedev, for his first Top 20 win on clay. It was also the first time multiple American players (with Taylor Fritz) reached the quarterfinals in singles in Rome since 2008. He reached his first Masters clay semifinal defeating seventh seed and world No. 9 Hubert Hurkacz, recording his second consecutive top 10 win for the first time in an ATP event and his 150th career win.

Seeded fifth, he reached his sixth ATP career final at the 2024 Queen's Club Championships, and second on grass with wins over Sebastián Báez, Alejandro Tabilo, Jack Draper and Sebastian Korda. He lifted his third title and first at the ATP 500 level, defeating Lorenzo Musetti in straight sets in the final. As a result he became the American No. 1 ahead of Fritz in the rankings, equalling his career-high of world No. 12 on June 24, 2024.

Seeded third, he reached the Paris Olympics semifinals with Taylor Fritz, and won the bronze medal defeating the duo from Czechia, Tomáš Macháč and Adam Pavlásek.

=== 2025: Major quarterfinals, World No. 8 ===
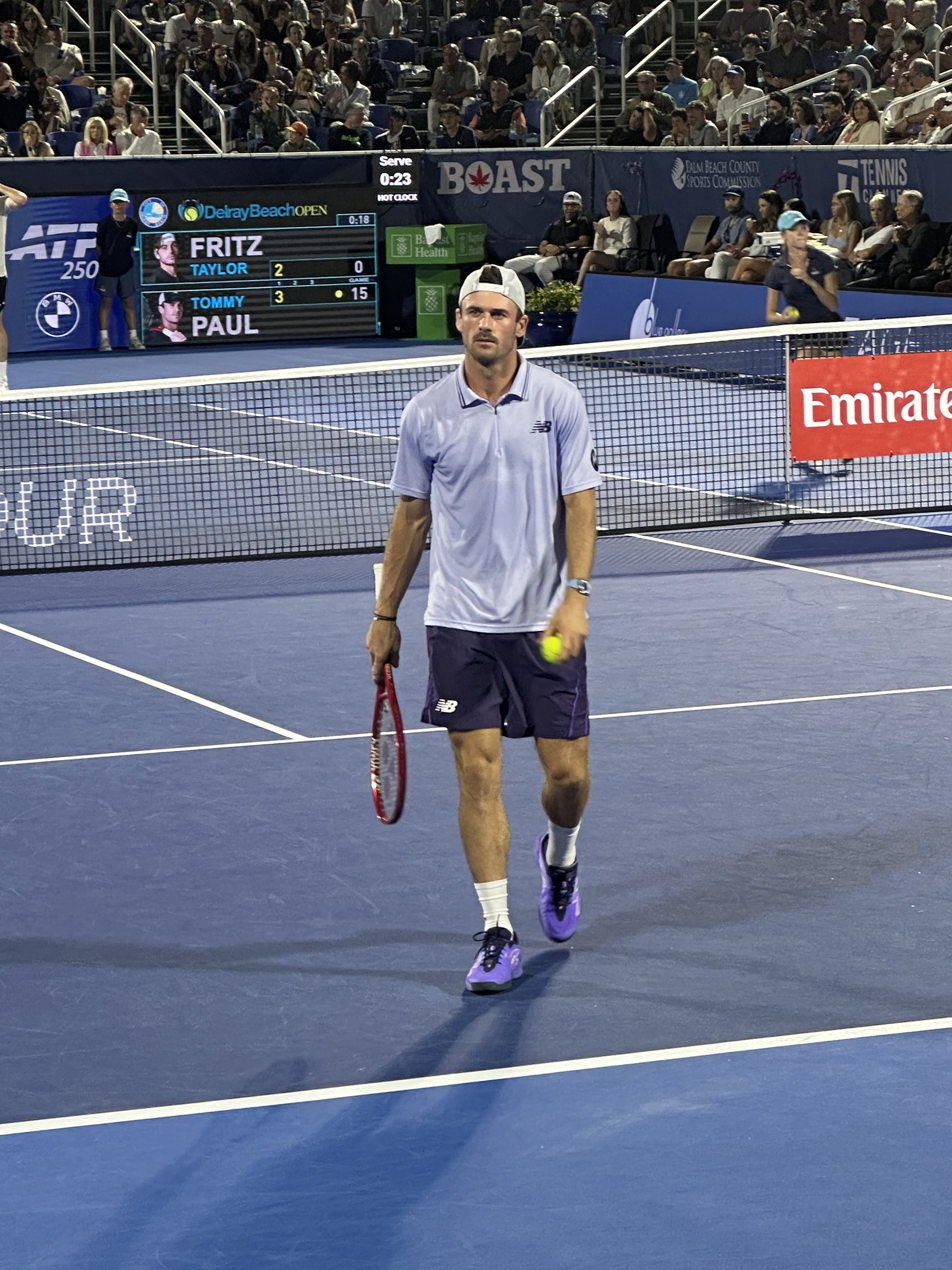
Tommy Paul at the 2026 Delray Beach Open

Tommy started the 2025 season off as the top seed at the 2025 Adelaide International where he reached the semifinals with wins over lucky losers Manuel Guinard and Rinky Hijikata, losing to eventual champion Félix Auger-Aliassime in three sets. He then reached his third major quarterfinal at the 2025 Australian Open before losing to Alexander Zverev in four sets. Following the first Slam of the season, Paul broke into the Top 10 for the first time in his career at No. 9 in the world on 27 January 2025.

Paul began his title defense of the 2025 Dallas Open with three straight wins over fellow Americans Jenson Brooksby,Ethan Quinn, and Reilly Opelka, before losing in the semifinals to eventual champion Denis Shapovalov In the Sunshine Double, he made the fourth round in Indian Wells and the third round in Miami.

Paul started his clay court season as the top seed in the 2025 U.S. Men's Clay Court Championships and ended in the semifinals of the tournament, where he lost to Jenson Brooksby. In Madrid, Paul defeated João Fonseca in straights sets and Karen Khachanov, but lost to Jack Draper in the last 16. At the Italian Open, he defeated Roberto Bautista Agut, 19th seed Tomáš Macháč, seventh seed Alex de Minaur, and 30th seed Hubert Hurkacz en route to a second straight semifinal in Rome. He was the first American man to make back-to-back Rome semifinals since Pete Sampras did it in 1993 and 1994. Paul eventually lost to Jannik Sinner in the semifinals.

Paul reached the quarterfinals of the 2025 French Open for the first time. He became one of two Americans, with Frances Tiafoe, to reach that stage at Roland Garros in 22 years, since Andre Agassi in 2003. As a result, he reached a new career high of world No. 8 on 9 June 2025. He also matched American players like Sampras, McEnroe and Connors, after unlocking his Grand Slam surface quarterfinal achievement, as he managed to reach the last eight on grass, hardcourts and clay (with a semifinal at the Australian Open in 2023 and the quarterfinals at Wimbledon in 2024). He became the second-oldest American man in the Open Era to reach a maiden quarterfinal at Roland Garros (after Frank Froehling at 29 years and two days in 1971).

=== 2026: First ATP clay court title ===
At the 2026 U.S. Men's Clay Court Championships Paul defeated Román Andrés Burruchaga in the final, 6–1, 3–6, 7–5 to win his first ATP title on clay. He saved three championship points en route to his fifth overall title. At the ATP 500 2026 Hamburg Open Paul reached the quarterfinals, defeating Tomas Martin Etcheverry 6–7(5), 7–6(5), 7–6(7), saving this time seven match points, in a three-tiebreak match that went over two days. Next he defeated home favorite Daniel Altmaier and third seed Alex de Minaur to reach his second final of the season and the second of his career on clay where he lost to Ignacio Buse.

== Playing style ==
Paul possesses a strong attacking forehand and solid footwork along the baseline and speed coming into net, attributes that have allowed him success on fast surfaces.

Paul has been coached by Brad Stine since 2020.

Paul is known to spend the time between points spinning his racquet on his fingers and flipping it in the air.

== Personal life ==
Paul has been in a relationship with influencer Paige Lorenze since 2022. The couple announced their engagement in July 2025. They married in July 2026.

He has brand sponsorships with New Balance, Celsius, WatchBox, Motorola, De Bethune, and Yonex Tennis.

== Career statistics ==
=== Grand Slam singles performance timeline ===
Key
W	F	SF	QF	#R	RR	Q#	P#	DNQ	A	Z#	PO	G	S	B	NMS	NTI	P	NH

(W) winner; (F) finalist; (SF) semifinalist; (QF) quarterfinalist; (#R) rounds 4, 3, 2, 1; (RR) round-robin stage; (Q#) qualification round; (P#) preliminary round; (DNQ) did not qualify; (A) absent; (Z#) Davis/Fed Cup Zonal Group (with number indication) or (PO) play-off; (G) gold, (S) silver or (B) bronze Olympic/Paralympic medal; (NMS) not a Masters tournament; (NTI) not a Tier I tournament; (P) postponed; (NH) not held; (SR) strike rate (events won / competed); (W–L) win–loss record.
To avoid confusion and double counting, these charts are updated at the conclusion of a tournament or when the player's participation has ended.

Current through the 2026 US Open.

Tournament	2015	2016	2017	2018	2019	2020	2021	2022	2023	2024	2025	2026	SR	W–L	Win %
Australian Open	A	A	A	Q2	Q2	3R	2R	2R	SF	3R	QF	4R	0 / 7	18–7	72%
French Open	A	Q2	A	A	1R	2R	2R	1R	2R	3R	QF	3R	0 / 8	11–8	58%
Wimbledon	A	Q1	A	A	Q3	NH	A	4R	3R	QF	2R	3R	0 / 4	12–5	71%
US Open	1R	Q1	1R	A	Q2	1R	1R	3R	4R	4R	3R	4R	0 / 8	13–9	56%
Win–loss	0–1	0–0	0–1	0–0	0–1	3–3	2–3	6–4	11–4	11–4	11–4	10–4	0 / 27	54–29	64%

=== Summer Olympics ===
==== Doubles: 1 (bronze medal) ====
Result	Year	Tournament	Surface	Partner	Opponents	Score
Bronze	2024	Paris Summer Olympics	Clay	(United States) Taylor Fritz	(Czech Republic) Tomáš Macháč (Czech Republic) Adam Pavlásek	6–3, 6–4
