= 2012 BB&T Atlanta Open – Doubles =

Doubles
- 2012 BB&T Atlanta Open

Final
- Champions: (Australia) Matthew Ebden (United States) Ryan Harrison
- Runners-up: (Belgium) Xavier Malisse (United States) Michael Russell
- Score: 6–3, 3-6, [10–6]

Events
Singles	Doubles
← 2011 ·	BB&T Atlanta Open	· 2013 →

Alex Bogomolov Jr. and Matthew Ebden were the defending champions but decided not to participate together.
Bogomolov played alongside Gilles Müller but withdrew before the second round because of a shoulder injury, while Ebden partnered up with Ryan Harrison to successfully defend the title against Xavier Malisse and Michael Russell with 6–3, 3-6, [10–6] in the final.

== Seeds ==
1. (United Kingdom) Colin Fleming / (United Kingdom) Ross Hutchins (semifinals)
2. (Mexico) Santiago González / (United States) Scott Lipsky (first round)
3. (Philippines) Treat Conrad Huey / (United Kingdom) Dominic Inglot (first round)
4. (United Kingdom) Jamie Delgado / (United Kingdom) Ken Skupski (quarterfinals)

== Draw ==
=== Key ===
- Q = Qualifier
- WC = Wild card
- LL = Lucky loser
- Alt = Alternate
- SE = Special exempt
- PR = Protected ranking
- ITF = ITF entry
- JE = Junior exempt
- w/o = Walkover
- r = Retired
- d = Defaulted
- SR = Special ranking

=== Draw ===
First round
1	(United Kingdom) C Fleming (United Kingdom) R Hutchins	7^{7}	6
(Czech Republic) L Dlouhý (France) N Mahut	6^{2}	2
(Russia) A Bogomolov Jr. (Luxembourg) G Müller	7^{7}	4	[10]
WC	(United States) S Johnson (United States) J Sock	6^{2}	6	[7]
3	(Philippines) TC Huey (United Kingdom) D Inglot	3	5
(Australia) M Ebden (United States) R Harrison	6	7
(Italy) P Lorenzi (United States) R Ram	3	7^{7}	[6]
(South Africa) K Anderson (South Africa) R de Voest	6	6^{3}	[10]
(Belgium) X Malisse (United States) M Russell	1	6	[10]
(United States) JP Fruttero (Russia) D Tursunov	6	1	[3]
(France) O Charroin (Canada) A Shamasdin	6	4	[9]
4	(United Kingdom) J Delgado (United Kingdom) K Skupski	2	6	[11]
(Australia) C Ebelthite (Australia) M Matosevic	7	7
WC	(United States) K King (United States) I Taboada	5	5
(South Africa) R Klaasen (United States) D Young	6	7^{7}
2	(Mexico) S González (United States) S Lipsky	2	6^{5}

Quarterfinals
1	(United Kingdom) C Fleming (United Kingdom) R Hutchins	w/o
(Russia) A Bogomolov Jr. (Luxembourg) G Müller
(Australia) M Ebden (United States) R Harrison	6^{2}	6	[10]
(South Africa) K Anderson (South Africa) R de Voest	7^{7}	4	[4]
(Belgium) X Malisse (United States) M Russell	7^{7}	6
4	(United Kingdom) J Delgado (United Kingdom) K Skupski	6^{0}	4
(Australia) C Ebelthite (Australia) M Matosevic	4	5
(South Africa) R Klaasen (United States) D Young	6	7

Semifinals
1	(United Kingdom) C Fleming (United Kingdom) R Hutchins	4	4
(Australia) M Ebden (United States) R Harrison	6	6
(Belgium) X Malisse (United States) M Russell	6	4	[10]
(South Africa) R Klaasen (United States) D Young	4	6	[5]

Final
(Australia) M Ebden (United States) R Harrison	6	3	[10]
(Belgium) X Malisse (United States) M Russell	3	6	[6]
