= 2010 Atlanta Tennis Championships – Singles =

Singles
- 2010 Atlanta Tennis Championships

Final
- Champion: (United States) Mardy Fish
- Runner-up: (United States) John Isner
- Score: 4–6, 6–4, 7–6^{(7–4)}

Details
- Draw: 28 (4 Q / 3 WC )
- Seeds: 8

Events
Singles	Doubles
← 2009 ·	Atlanta Tennis Championships	· 2011 →

The 2010 Atlanta Tennis Championships – Singles was part of the 2010 ATP World Tour. Defending champion Robby Ginepri lost in the second round to fellow American and eventual champion Mardy Fish. Fish went on to win his second title of the year—and of the month—by defeating compatriot John Isner in the final, 4–6, 6–4, 7–6^{(7–4)}.

== Seeds ==
The top four seeds receive a bye into the second round.

1. (United States) Andy Roddick (semifinals)
2. (United States) John Isner (final)
3. (Australia) Lleyton Hewitt (second round)
4. (Argentina) Horacio Zeballos (second round)
5. (Serbia) Janko Tipsarević (first round)
6. (United States) Mardy Fish (champion)
7. (Belgium) Xavier Malisse (quarterfinals)
8. (Germany) Benjamin Becker (first round)

== Draw ==
=== Key ===
- Q = Qualifier
- WC = Wild card
- LL = Lucky loser
- Alt = Alternate
- ITF = ITF entry
- PR = Protected ranking
- SR = Special ranking
- SE = Special exempt
- JE = Junior exempt
- JR = Junior Accelerator Programme entrant
- CO = College Accelerator Programme entrant
- NG = Next Gen Accelerator Program entrant
- w/o = Walkover
- r = Retired
- d = Defaulted

=== Finals ===
Semifinals
1/WC	(United States) Andy Roddick	6^{5}	3
6	(United States) Mardy Fish	7^{7}	6
(South Africa) Kevin Anderson	3	7^{9}	3
2	(United States) John Isner	6	6^{7}	6

Final
6	(United States) Mardy Fish	4	6	7^{7}
2	(United States) John Isner	6	4	6^{4}

=== Top half ===
First round
(United States) R Ram	6	7^{7}
(Slovakia) K Beck	4	6^{4}
(Ukraine) I Marchenko	6	7^{7}
(Belgium) K Vliegen	4	6^{4}
Q	(United States) R Sweeting	6^{1}	3
7	(Belgium) X Malisse	7^{7}	6
(United States) T Dent	6	3	6
(United States) J Blake	3	6	4
(United States) R Ginepri	7^{7}	6
Q	(Australia) N Lindahl	6^{4}	2
WC	(United Kingdom) J Ward	1	2
6	(United States) M Fish	6	6

Second round
1/WC	(United States) A Roddick	6	6^{1}	6
(United States) R Ram	1	7^{7}	3
(Ukraine) I Marchenko	3	3
7	(Belgium) X Malisse	6	6
4	(Argentina) H Zeballos	6	2	0
(United States) T Dent	4	6	6
(United States) R Ginepri	1	5
6	(United States) M Fish	6	7

Quarterfinals
1/WC	(United States) A Roddick	4	6	6
7	(Belgium) X Malisse	6	3	4
(United States) T Dent	3	0
6	(United States) M Fish	6	6

Semifinals
1/WC	(United States) A Roddick	6^{5}	3
6	(United States) M Fish	7^{7}	6

=== Bottom half ===
First round
5	(Serbia) J Tipsarević	3	5
(South Africa) K Anderson	6	7
WC	(United States) D Young	7	6
(Israel) D Sela	5	0
(Slovakia) L Lacko	4	7^{7}	7^{7}
Q	(Russia) I Kunitsyn	6	6^{4}	6^{4}
8	(Germany) B Becker	3	3
(United States) M Russell	6	6
(Russia) T Gabashvili	1	4
(Germany) R Schüttler	6	6
(Poland) M Przysiężny	4	6	6^{4}
Q	(Luxembourg) G Müller	6	4	7^{7}

Second round
(South Africa) K Anderson	7	6
WC	(United States) D Young	5	3
(Slovakia) L Lacko	6	6
3	(Australia) L Hewitt	4	2
(United States) M Russell	1	6	7
(Germany) R Schüttler	6	2	5
Q	(Luxembourg) G Müller	6	6^{6}	6^{7}
2	(United States) J Isner	4	7^{8}	7^{9}

Quarterfinals
(South Africa) K Anderson	6	6
(Slovakia) L Lacko	3	4
(United States) M Russell	1	2
2	(United States) J Isner	6	6

Semifinals
(South Africa) K Anderson	3	7^{9}	3
2	(United States) J Isner	6	6^{7}	6
