= 2013 BB&T Atlanta Open – Singles =

Singles
- 2013 BB&T Atlanta Open

Final
- Champion: (United States) John Isner
- Runner-up: (South Africa) Kevin Anderson
- Score: 6–7^{(3–7)}, 7–6^{(7–2)}, 7–6^{(7–2)}

Details
- Draw: 28 (4 Q / 3 WC )
- Seeds: 8

Events
Singles	Doubles
← 2012 ·	BB&T Atlanta Open	· 2014 →

Andy Roddick did not defend his title as he had retired from professional tennis in September 2012.

John Isner won the title after two previous final appearances, defeating Kevin Anderson in the final, 6–7^{(3–7)}, 7–6^{(7–2)}, 7–6^{(7–2)}.

== Seeds ==
The top four seeds receive a bye into the second round.

1. (United States) John Isner (champion)
2. (South Africa) Kevin Anderson (final)
3. (Croatia) Ivan Dodig (quarterfinals)
4. (Netherlands) Igor Sijsling (second round)
5. (Chinese Taipei) Lu Yen-hsun (second round)
6. (United States) Mardy Fish (first round)
7. (Australia) Lleyton Hewitt (semifinals)
8. (Russia) Evgeny Donskoy (second round)

== Draw ==
=== Key ===
- Q = Qualifier
- WC = Wild card
- LL = Lucky loser
- Alt = Alternate
- SE = Special exempt
- PR = Protected ranking
- ITF = ITF entry
- JE = Junior exempt
- w/o = Walkover
- r = Retired
- d = Defaulted
- SR = Special ranking

=== Finals ===
Semifinals
1	(United States) John Isner	6	4	7^{7}
7	(Australia) Lleyton Hewitt	4	6	6^{5}
(United States) Ryan Harrison	3	6^{3}
2	(South Africa) Kevin Anderson	6	7^{7}

Final
1	(United States) John Isner	6^{3}	7^{7}	7^{7}
2	(South Africa) Kevin Anderson	7^{7}	6^{2}	6^{2}

=== Top half ===
First round
(Colombia) A Falla	1	7^{9}	2
WC	(United States) C Harrison	6	6^{7}	6
(United States) J Blake	7^{7}	4	7^{7}
Q	(United States) T Smyczek	6^{3}	6	6^{4}
(United States) R Ram	3	4
8	(Russia) E Donskoy	6	6
(Lithuania) R Berankis	7^{7}	2	7^{10}
Q	(Germany) M Zverev	6^{4}	6	6^{8}
WC	(United States) D Kudla	5	4
WC	(United States) R Williams	7	6
(France) É Roger-Vasselin	4	4
7	(Australia) L Hewitt	6	6

Second round
1	(United States) J Isner	7^{11}	4	7
WC	(United States) C Harrison	6^{9}	6	5
(United States) J Blake	6	6
8	(Russia) E Donskoy	3	2
3	(Croatia) I Dodig	6	6^{3}	6
(Lithuania) R Berankis	1	7^{7}	3
WC	(United States) R Williams	6^{6}	4
7	(Australia) L Hewitt	7^{8}	6

Quarterfinals
1	(United States) J Isner	7^{7}	7^{7}
(United States) J Blake	6^{1}	6^{5}
3	(Croatia) I Dodig	6	3	0
7	(Australia) L Hewitt	1	6	6

Semifinals
1	(United States) J Isner	6	4	7^{7}
7	(Australia) L Hewitt	4	6	6^{5}

=== Bottom half ===
First round
6	(United States) M Fish	6	2	5
(United States) M Russell	4	6	7
(United States) J Sock	5	4
(Colombia) S Giraldo	7	6
(United States) R Harrison	6	2	6
(Australia) M Matosevic	2	6	3
5	(Chinese Taipei) Y-h Lu	6	7
Q	(United States) K King	3	5
(Uzbekistan) D Istomin	6	6
(Slovakia) L Lacko	1	3
Q	(Australia) M Ebden	6	0
SE	(Croatia) I Karlović	2	0^{r}

Second round
(United States) M Russell	7	3	0^{r}
(Colombia) S Giraldo	5	6	3
(United States) R Harrison	6	6
4	(Netherlands) I Sijsling	4	3
5	(Chinese Taipei) Y-h Lu	5	2
(Uzbekistan) D Istomin	7	6
Q	(Australia) M Ebden	7^{9}	2	2
2	(South Africa) K Anderson	6^{7}	6	6

Quarterfinals
(Colombia) S Giraldo	3	6	6^{2}
(United States) R Harrison	6	3	7^{7}
(Uzbekistan) D Istomin	3	6	3
2	(South Africa) K Anderson	6	3	6

Semifinals
(United States) R Harrison	3	6^{3}
2	(South Africa) K Anderson	6	7^{7}

== Qualifying ==
=== Seeds ===
1. (Australia) Matthew Ebden (qualified)
2. (United States) Tim Smyczek (qualified)
3. (India) Somdev Devvarman (second round)
4. (Chinese Taipei) Jimmy Wang (first round, retired)
5. (Germany) Mischa Zverev (qualified)
6. (Japan) Yūichi Sugita (second round)
7. (United States) Donald Young (qualifying competition)
8. (United States) Robby Ginepri (qualifying competition)

=== Qualifiers ===
1. (Australia) Matthew Ebden
2. (United States) Tim Smyczek
3. (Germany) Mischa Zverev
4. (United States) Kevin King

=== Qualifying draw ===
==== First qualifier ====
First round
1	(Australia) Matthew Ebden	6	6
(Mexico) Santiago González	4	1
(South Africa) Dean O'Brien	7^{7}	6^{3}	6
(Colombia) Juan Carlos Spir	6^{5}	7^{7}	2
(Australia) Mark Verryth	5	2
(Australia) Chris Guccione	7	6
(Brazil) André Sá	6	2^{r}
6	(Japan) Yūichi Sugita	2	1

Second round
1	(Australia) Matthew Ebden	6	6
(South Africa) Dean O'Brien	1	1
(Australia) Chris Guccione	6	6
6	(Japan) Yūichi Sugita	4	2

Qualifying competition
1	(Australia) Matthew Ebden	6	7^{7}
(Australia) Chris Guccione	4	6^{2}

==== Second qualifier ====
First round
2	(United States) Tim Smyczek	6	6
(Australia) Luke Saville	1	3
(United States) Mitchell Frank	3	6	6
WC	(United States) Nathan Pasha	6	2	4
(Brazil) Marcelo Demoliner	3	5
(India) Saketh Myneni	6	7
(Romania) Cătălin-Ionuț Gârd	2	2
7	(United States) Donald Young	6	6

Second round
2	(United States) Tim Smyczek	6	6
(United States) Mitchell Frank	1	4
(India) Saketh Myneni	6^{3}	3
7	(United States) Donald Young	7^{7}	6

Qualifying competition
2	(United States) Tim Smyczek	7	7^{7}
7	(United States) Donald Young	5	6^{3}

==== Third qualifier ====
First round
3	(India) Somdev Devvarman	6	6
(United States) Patrick Davidson	0	2
(United States) Jason Jung	2	0
(India) Prakash Amritraj	6	6
(Zimbabwe) Takura Happy	6	6
WC	(United States) Eric Sock	1	2
WC	(United States) Nathan Rakitt	4	3
5	(Germany) Mischa Zverev	6	6

Second round
3	(India) Somdev Devvarman	3	4
(India) Prakash Amritraj	6	6
(Zimbabwe) Takura Happy	3	3
5	(Germany) Mischa Zverev	6	6

Qualifying competition
(India) Prakash Amritraj	4	2
5	(Germany) Mischa Zverev	6	6

==== Fourth qualifier ====
First round
4	(Chinese Taipei) Jimmy Wang	6^{4}	0^{r}
(United States) Kevin King	7^{7}	1
(United States) Tyler Hochwalt	6	6
(United States) Jean-Yves Aubone	3	4
(United States) Jeff Dadamo	6	6
WC	(United States) Christopher Eubanks	2	3
(United States) Andrew Carter	3	1
8	(United States) Robby Ginepri	6	6

Second round
(United States) Kevin King	6^{4}	7^{7}	6
(United States) Tyler Hochwalt	7^{7}	6^{4}	1
(United States) Jeff Dadamo	6	1	3
8	(United States) Robby Ginepri	3	6	6

Qualifying competition
(United States) Kevin King	2	6	6
8	(United States) Robby Ginepri	6	4	4
