= 2011 Atlanta Tennis Championships – Doubles =

Doubles
- 2011 Atlanta Tennis Championships

Final
- Champions: (United States) Alex Bogomolov Jr. (Australia) Matthew Ebden
- Runners-up: (Germany) Matthias Bachinger (Germany) Frank Moser
- Score: 3–6, 7–5, [10–8]

Events
Singles	Doubles
← 2010 ·	Atlanta Tennis Championships	· 2012 →

Scott Lipsky and Rajeev Ram were the defending champions, but were defeated in the first round by wildcards Drake Bernstein and Kevin King.
Alex Bogomolov Jr. and Matthew Ebden defeated Matthias Bachinger and Frank Moser in the final, 3–6, 7–5, [10–8].

== Seeds ==
1. (United States) Scott Lipsky / (United States) Rajeev Ram (first round)
2. (Brazil) Marcelo Melo / (United Kingdom) Jamie Murray (first round)
3. (Israel) Jonathan Erlich / (Israel) Andy Ram (first round)
4. (United Kingdom) Colin Fleming / (United Kingdom) Ross Hutchins (semifinals)

== Draw ==
=== Key ===
- Q = Qualifier
- WC = Wild card
- LL = Lucky loser
- Alt = Alternate
- SE = Special exempt
- PR = Protected ranking
- ITF = ITF entry
- JE = Junior exempt
- w/o = Walkover
- r = Retired
- d = Defaulted
- SR = Special ranking

=== Draw ===
First round
1	(United States) S Lipsky (United States) R Ram	6^{3}	3
WC	(United States) D Bernstein (United States) K King	7^{7}	6
(Germany) M Bachinger (Germany) F Moser	4	7^{7}	[10]
WC	(United States) R Harrison (United States) D Young	6	6^{3}	[6]
4	(United Kingdom) C Fleming (United Kingdom) R Hutchins	7	6^{5}	[10]
(Bulgaria) G Dimitrov (United States) R Sweeting	5	7^{7}	[6]
(Germany) M Berrer (Chinese Taipei) Y-h Lu	7^{9}	4	[5]
(Russia) I Kunitsyn (United States) M Russell	6^{7}	6	[10]
(France) N Mahut (Luxembourg) G Müller	6	4	[5]
(Lithuania) R Berankis (Belgium) X Malisse	4	6	[10]
(India) S Devvarman (Philippines) TC Huey	6	7
3	(Israel) J Erlich (Israel) A Ram	4	5
(Australia) A Fisher (Australia) S Huss	6^{5}	5
(United States) A Bogomolov Jr. (Australia) M Ebden	7^{7}	7
(United States) J Blake (United States) J Isner	6	6
2	(Brazil) M Melo (United Kingdom) J Murray	4	2

Quarterfinals
WC	(United States) D Bernstein (United States) K King	6^{8}	1
(Germany) M Bachinger (Germany) F Moser	7^{10}	6
4	(United Kingdom) C Fleming (United Kingdom) R Hutchins	6	6
(Russia) I Kunitsyn (United States) M Russell	3	1
(Lithuania) R Berankis (Belgium) X Malisse	6	7^{7}
(India) S Devvarman (Philippines) TC Huey	1	6^{5}
(United States) A Bogomolov Jr. (Australia) M Ebden	w/o
(United States) J Blake (United States) J Isner

Semifinals
(Germany) M Bachinger (Germany) F Moser	6	1	[10]
4	(United Kingdom) C Fleming (United Kingdom) R Hutchins	4	6	[8]
(Lithuania) R Berankis (Belgium) X Malisse	1	6^{3}
(United States) A Bogomolov Jr. (Australia) M Ebden	6	7^{7}

Finals
(Germany) M Bachinger (Germany) F Moser	6	5	[8]
(United States) A Bogomolov Jr. (Australia) M Ebden	3	7	[10]
