= 2012 BB&T Atlanta Open – Singles =

Singles
- 2012 BB&T Atlanta Open

Final
- Champion: (United States) Andy Roddick
- Runner-up: (Luxembourg) Gilles Müller
- Score: 1–6, 7–6^{(7–2)}, 6–2

Details
- Draw: 28 (4 Q / 3 WC )
- Seeds: 8

Events
Singles	Doubles
← 2011 ·	BB&T Atlanta Open	· 2013 →

Mardy Fish was the defending champion, but had to retire in his second round match against Gilles Müller.

Andy Roddick won the title, defeating Müller in the final, 1–6, 7–6^{(7–2)}, 6–2.

== Seeds ==
The top four seeds receive a bye into the second round.

1. (United States) John Isner (semifinals)
2. (United States) Mardy Fish (second round, retired because of an ankle injury)
3. (Japan) Kei Nishikori (quarterfinals)
4. (United States) Andy Roddick (champion)
5. (South Africa) Kevin Anderson (second round)
6. (United States) Ryan Harrison (first round)
7. (Russia) Alex Bogomolov Jr. (first round)
8. (Japan) Go Soeda (semifinals)

== Draw ==
=== Key ===
- Q = Qualifier
- WC = Wild card
- LL = Lucky loser
- Alt = Alternate
- SE = Special exempt
- PR = Protected ranking
- ITF = ITF entry
- JE = Junior exempt
- w/o = Walkover
- r = Retired
- d = Defaulted
- SR = Special ranking

=== Finals ===
Semifinals
1	(United States) John Isner	4	7^{7}	4
4	(United States) Andy Roddick	6	6^{5}	6
8	(Japan) Go Soeda	4	3
(Luxembourg) Gilles Müller	6	6

Final
4	(United States) Andy Roddick	1	7^{7}	6
(Luxembourg) Gilles Müller	6	6^{2}	2

=== Top half ===
First round
SE	(United States) R Ram	1	3
Q	(Belgium) R Bemelmans	6	6
WC	(United States) S Johnson	6	3	6
(United States) D Young	3	6	3
WC	(United States) J Sock	6	4	6
7	(Russia) A Bogomolov Jr.	2	6	4
(Chile) P Capdeville	3	6	4
(France) N Mahut	6	3	6
(United States) M Russell	2	6	7^{7}
Q	(United States) A Kuznetsov	6	4	6^{4}
(Italy) P Lorenzi	4	3
5	(South Africa) K Anderson	6	6

Second round
1	(United States) J Isner	4	6	6
Q	(Belgium) R Bemelmans	6	3	4
WC	(United States) S Johnson	6^{5}	6^{5}
WC	(United States) J Sock	7^{7}	7
4	(United States) A Roddick	7^{7}	6
(France) N Mahut	6^{4}	3
(United States) M Russell	6^{5}	6	6
5	(South Africa) K Anderson	7^{7}	4	4

Quarterfinals
1	(United States) J Isner	7^{9}	6
WC	(United States) J Sock	6^{7}	4
4	(United States) A Roddick	6	6
(United States) M Russell	3	4

Semifinals
1	(United States) J Isner	4	7^{7}	4
4	(United States) A Roddick	6	6^{5}	6

=== Bottom half ===
First round
8	(Japan) G Soeda	4	7	6
(Belgium) X Malisse	6	5	4
(Russia) I Kunitsyn	6	6^{3}	6
WC	(United States) B Baker	4	7^{7}	3
Q	(Lithuania) R Berankis	6	6
(Russia) D Tursunov	3	2
6	(United States) R Harrison	6	3	5
(United States) J Blake	1	6	7
Q	(Ukraine) S Bubka	7	1	1
(Australia) M Ebden	5	6	6
(Luxembourg) G Müller	7^{7}	6
(Australia) M Matosevic	6^{5}	4

Second round
8	(Japan) G Soeda	6	7
(Russia) I Kunitsyn	1	5
Q	(Lithuania) R Berankis	4	7^{9}	4
3	(Japan) K Nishikori	6	6^{7}	6
(United States) J Blake	7^{8}	4	4
(Australia) M Ebden	6^{6}	6	6
(Luxembourg) G Müller	4	2
2	(United States) M Fish	6	3^{r}

Quarterfinals
8	(Japan) G Soeda	6	6
3	(Japan) K Nishikori	2	1
(Australia) M Ebden	4	4
(Luxembourg) G Müller	6	6

Semifinals
8	(Japan) G Soeda	4	3
(Luxembourg) G Müller	6	6

== Qualifying ==
=== Seeds ===
1. (Belgium) Ruben Bemelmans (qualified)
2. (Lithuania) Ričardas Berankis (qualified)
3. (Ukraine) Sergei Bubka (qualified)
4. (Brazil) Ricardo Mello (qualifying competition)
5. (South Africa) Rik de Voest (qualifying competition)
6. (United States) Tim Smyczek (qualifying competition)
7. (United States) Alex Kuznetsov (qualified)
8. (Brazil) Ricardo Hocevar (qualifying competition)

=== Qualifiers ===
1. (Belgium) Ruben Bemelmans
2. (Lithuania) Ričardas Berankis
3. (Ukraine) Sergei Bubka
4. (United States) Alex Kuznetsov

=== Draw ===
==== First qualifier ====
First round
1	(Belgium) Ruben Bemelmans	6	6
WC	(United States) Erik Graves	2	1
WC	(Czech Republic) Lukáš Dlouhý	7^{7}	6
WC	(United States) Christopher Eubanks	6^{3}	0
(France) Olivier Charroin	6	6
WC	(Brazil) Luis Inaimo	3	4
(United States) Philip Simmonds	6^{6}	5
8	(Brazil) Ricardo Hocevar	7^{8}	7

Second round
1	(Belgium) Ruben Bemelmans	6	7
WC	(Czech Republic) Lukáš Dlouhý	1	5
(France) Olivier Charroin	4	5
8	(Brazil) Ricardo Hocevar	6	7

Qualifying competition
1	(Belgium) Ruben Bemelmans	6	6
8	(Brazil) Ricardo Hocevar	2	2

==== Second qualifier ====
First round
2	(Lithuania) Ričardas Berankis	6	6
WC	(United States) Ignacio Taboada	2	1
WC	(United States) Drake Bernstein	6	5
(United States) Bradley Cox	3	0^{r}
WC	(United States) Kevin King	6	6
WC	(United States) Will Spencer	4	3
WC	(United States) Nathan Pasha	7^{7}	2	5
5	(South Africa) Rik de Voest	6^{5}	6	7

Second round
2	(Lithuania) Ričardas Berankis	6	6
WC	(United States) Drake Bernstein	4	1
WC	(United States) Kevin King	7^{7}	6^{4}	4
5	(South Africa) Rik de Voest	6^{3}	7^{7}	6

Qualifying competition
2	(Lithuania) Ričardas Berankis	6^{4}	7^{7}	6
5	(South Africa) Rik de Voest	7^{7}	6^{5}	3

==== Third qualifier ====
First round
3	(Ukraine) Sergei Bubka	6	6
WC	(United States) Jack Anton	1	0
(Colombia) Juan Carlos Spir	6^{4}	1
(Romania) Cătălin-Ionuț Gârd	7^{7}	6
(Canada) Pierre-Ludovic Duclos	7^{7}	5	3
(Haiti) Olivier Sajous	6^{4}	7	6
WC	(United States) Judd Motz	0	1
6	(United States) Tim Smyczek	6	6

Second round
3	(Ukraine) Sergei Bubka	6	7^{8}
(Romania) Cătălin-Ionuț Gârd	4	6^{6}
(Haiti) Olivier Sajous	5	3
6	(United States) Tim Smyczek	7	6

Qualifying competition
3	(Ukraine) Sergei Bubka	6	6
6	(United States) Tim Smyczek	3	4

==== Fourth qualifier ====
First round
4	(Brazil) Ricardo Mello	7	7
(Russia) Mikhail Ledovskikh	5	5
WC	(Zimbabwe) Mbonisi Ndimande	6	6
WC	(United States) David Span	3	0
(Switzerland) Luca Margaroli	6	5	6
WC	(United States) Eric Sock	4	7	2
(South Africa) Dean O'Brien	2	2
7	(United States) Alex Kuznetsov	6	6

Second round
4	(Brazil) Ricardo Mello	6	6
WC	(Zimbabwe) Mbonisi Ndimande	4	2
(Switzerland) Luca Margaroli	2	0
7	(United States) Alex Kuznetsov	6	6

Qualifying competition
4	(Brazil) Ricardo Mello	1	6	4
7	(United States) Alex Kuznetsov	6	3	6
