= 2010 Atlanta Tennis Championships – Doubles =

Doubles
- 2010 Atlanta Tennis Championships

Final
- Champions: (United States) Scott Lipsky (United States) Rajeev Ram
- Runners-up: (India) Rohan Bopanna (Belgium) Kristof Vliegen
- Score: 6–3, 6–7^{(4–7)}, [12–10]

Events
Singles	Doubles
← 2009 ·	Atlanta Tennis Championships	· 2011 →

Dmitry Tursunov and Ernests Gulbis were the defending champions, but chose not to participate.
Scott Lipsky and Rajeev Ram won in the final 6–3, 6–7^{(4–7)}, [12–10], against Rohan Bopanna and Kristof Vliegen.

== Seeds ==
1. (United Kingdom) Colin Fleming / (United Kingdom) Ken Skupski (first round)
2. (Netherlands Antilles) Jean-Julien Rojer / (Argentina) Horacio Zeballos (first round)
3. (Mexico) Santiago González / (United States) Travis Rettenmaier (first round)
4. (United Kingdom) Ross Hutchins / (Australia) Jordan Kerr (first round)

== Draw ==
=== Key ===
- Q = Qualifier
- WC = Wild card
- LL = Lucky loser
- Alt = Alternate
- SE = Special exempt
- PR = Protected ranking
- ITF = ITF entry
- JE = Junior exempt
- w/o = Walkover
- r = Retired
- d = Defaulted
- SR = Special ranking

=== Draw ===
First round
1	(United Kingdom) C Fleming (United Kingdom) K Skupski	3	7^{7}	[9]
(Israel) J Erlich (Serbia) J Tipsarević	6	6^{4}	[11]
(India) R Bopanna (Belgium) K Vliegen	6	6
(Thailand) Sa Ratiwatana (Thailand) So Ratiwatana	3	4
3	(Mexico) S González (United States) T Rettenmaier	2	4
(Australia) S Huss (Brazil) A Sá	6	6
(Russia) T Gabashvili (Poland) M Przysiężny	2	4
(United States) M Fish (United States) A Roddick	6	6
(United States) S Lipsky (United States) R Ram	7	6
(Germany) B Becker (Slovakia) L Lacko	5	1
(South Africa) K Anderson (United States) M Russell	7^{7}	6
4	(United Kingdom) R Hutchins (Australia) J Kerr	6^{3}	3
WC	(United States) R Ginepri (United States) R Sweeting	6	4	[3]
(United States) J Blake (United States) J Isner	3	6	[10]
(Germany) M Kohlmann (Germany) R Schüttler	6^{5}	7	[10]
2	(Netherlands Antilles) J-J Rojer (Argentina) H Zeballos	7^{7}	5	[7]

Quarterfinals
(Israel) J Erlich (Serbia) J Tipsarević	6	6^{7}	[8]
(India) R Bopanna (Belgium) K Vliegen	3	7^{9}	[10]
(Australia) S Huss (Brazil) A Sá
(United States) M Fish (United States) A Roddick	w/o
(United States) S Lipsky (United States) R Ram	7^{7}	7^{11}
(South Africa) K Anderson (United States) M Russell	6^{2}	6^{9}
(United States) J Blake (United States) J Isner	6	6
(Germany) M Kohlmann (Germany) R Schüttler	4	1

Semifinals
(India) R Bopanna (Belgium) K Vliegen	7	7
(Australia) S Huss (Brazil) A Sá	5	5
(United States) S Lipsky (United States) R Ram	7^{7}	7^{7}
(United States) J Blake (United States) J Isner	6^{5}	6^{5}

Finals
(India) R Bopanna (Belgium) K Vliegen	3	7^{7}	[10]
(United States) S Lipsky (United States) R Ram	6	6^{4}	[12]
