= Dean Goldfine =

American tennis coach and player

Dean Goldfine (born March 8, 1965, in Chicago, Illinois) is a tennis coach and former professional tennis player from the United States.

== Coaching career ==
Goldfine was professional tennis player Todd Martin's coach from 1996 to 2002. Under his tutelage, Martin achieved a career-high rank of No. 4 in the ATP singles ranking, reached the US Open final, and qualified for the ATP year-end championship in 1999.

Goldfine has also coached Xavier Malisse and Aaron Krickstein on the ATP Tour, and Mary Joe Fernandez on the WTA Tour.

In 2003, the USTA named Goldfine as one of its USA Tennis High Performance Coaches. At the 2004 Olympics in Athens, he was sent as team coach for the USA tennis team alongside Patrick McEnroe. Goldfine was also involved in USA Davis Cup coaching activities as an assistant coach.

In the 2004 tennis off-season after the U.S.'s Davis Cup final against Spain, USA Davis Cup stalwart Andy Roddick hired Goldfine to replace Brad Gilbert as his full-time coach. Under Goldfine's coaching, Roddick won five titles (each on a different surface) and reached the 2005 Australian Open semi-final and 2005 Wimbledon final. In February 2006, Goldfine and Roddick decided to part ways amicably.

After retiring from his professional coaching career, Dean started coaching top juniors in South Florida, including Roy Lederman, Ryan Smith, David Omsky, and his most notable pupil, Leah Bush

In 2022, he became a traveling coach for professional player Ben Shelton.

== Playing career ==
In high school, Goldfine played number one for Chaminade-Madonna College Preparatory School. Goldfine played varsity tennis at Texas A&M University from 1983 to 1987. In 1989, he reached a career-high ATP Tour singles ranking of 628.

== Personal ==
In 2000, Goldfine launched the Pat Goldfine Tennis Pro-Am, a charity fundraiser for cancer research, in memory of his mother who died of breast and lung cancer. Goldfine resides in Hollywood, Florida, with his two children.
