= 2011 Atlanta Tennis Championships – Singles =

Singles
- 2011 Atlanta Tennis Championships

Final
- Champion: (United States) Mardy Fish
- Runner-up: (United States) John Isner
- Score: 3–6, 7–6^{(8–6)}, 6–2

Details
- Draw: 28 (4 Q / 3 WC )
- Seeds: 8

Events
Singles	Doubles
← 2010 ·	Atlanta Tennis Championships	· 2012 →

Mardy Fish was the defending champion, and in a repeat of the previous year's final, he successfully defended his title by defeating his compatriot John Isner after dropping the opening set. This time the score was 3–6, 7–6^{(8–6)}, 6–2.

== Seeds ==
The top four seeds received a bye into the second round.

1. (United States) Mardy Fish (champion)
2. (South Africa) Kevin Anderson (quarterfinals)
3. (United States) John Isner (final)
4. (Belgium) Xavier Malisse (second round)
5. (Bulgaria) Grigor Dimitrov (first round)
6. (Russia) Igor Kunitsyn (first round)
7. (United States) Alex Bogomolov Jr. (first round)
8. (India) Somdev Devvarman (quarterfinals)

== Draw ==
=== Key ===
- Q = Qualifier
- WC = Wild card
- LL = Lucky loser
- Alt = Alternate
- SE = Special exempt
- PR = Protected ranking
- ITF = ITF entry
- JE = Junior exempt
- w/o = Walkover
- r = Retired
- d = Defaulted
- SR = Special ranking

=== Finals ===
Semifinals
1	(United States) Mardy Fish	6	6
(United States) Ryan Harrison	2	4
3	(United States) John Isner	7	6^{3}	6
(Luxembourg) Gilles Müller	5	7^{7}	1

Final
1	(United States) Mardy Fish	3	7^{8}	6
3	(United States) John Isner	6	6^{6}	2

=== Top half ===
First round
(Lithuania) R Berankis	6^{5}	2
(France) N Mahut	7^{7}	6
(Germany) M Berrer	6^{6}	4
(Japan) T Ito	7^{8}	6
(United States) R Sweeting	4	6	4
8	(India) S Devvarman	6	3	6
Q	(Japan) Y Sugita	1	6^{5}
(United States) R Harrison	6	7^{7}
(Australia) L Hewitt	6	6
Q	(United States) P Simmonds	4	4
Q	(United States) R Ram	6	6
5	(Bulgaria) G Dimitrov	4	4

Second round
1	(United States) M Fish	6	6
(France) N Mahut	3	3
(Japan) T Ito	1	3
8	(India) S Devvarman	6	6
4	(Belgium) X Malisse	7^{7}	4	4
(United States) R Harrison	6^{3}	6	6
(Australia) L Hewitt	5	6	2
Q	(United States) R Ram	7	2	6

Quarterfinals
1	(United States) M Fish	6	6
8	(India) S Devvarman	4	3
(United States) R Harrison	4	6	7^{7}
Q	(United States) R Ram	6	1	6^{5}

Semifinals
1	(United States) M Fish	6	6
(United States) R Harrison	2	4

=== Bottom half ===
First round
6	(Russia) I Kunitsyn	7^{7}	2	5
Q	(Australia) M Matosevic	6^{3}	6	7
(Chinese Taipei) Y-h Lu	7	7^{7}
(Germany) M Bachinger	5	6^{4}
(United States) J Blake	5	7^{7}	6
(Latvia) E Gulbis	7	6^{5}	2
7	(United States) A Bogomolov Jr.	3	6^{6}
(Luxembourg) G Müller	6	7^{8}
WC	(Germany) T Haas	4	5
WC	(United States) R Ginepri	6	7
WC	(United States) D Young	0	3
(United States) M Russell	6	6

Second round
Q	(Australia) M Matosevic	6	1	2
(Chinese Taipei) Y-h Lu	3	6	6
(United States) J Blake	6^{8}	7^{7}	5
3	(United States) J Isner	7^{10}	6^{3}	7
(Luxembourg) G Müller	7^{8}	2	6
WC	(United States) R Ginepri	6^{6}	6	2
(United States) M Russell	1	5
2	(South Africa) K Anderson	6	7

Quarterfinals
(Chinese Taipei) Y-h Lu	1	2
3	(United States) J Isner	6	6
(Luxembourg) G Müller	7^{7}	7^{7}
2	(South Africa) K Anderson	6^{3}	6^{3}

Semifinals
3	(United States) J Isner	7	6^{3}	6
(Luxembourg) G Müller	5	7^{7}	1
