= 2013 BB&T Atlanta Open – Doubles =

Doubles
- 2013 BB&T Atlanta Open

Final
- Champions: (France) Édouard Roger-Vasselin (Netherlands) Igor Sijsling
- Runners-up: (United Kingdom) Colin Fleming (United Kingdom) Jonathan Marray
- Score: 7–6^{(8–6)}, 6–3

Events
Singles	Doubles
← 2012 ·	BB&T Atlanta Open	· 2014 →

Matthew Ebden and Ryan Harrison were the defending champions, but Ebden decided not to participate. Harrison played alongside his brother Christian Harrison, but lost in the first round to Ivan Dodig and Marcelo Melo.
Édouard Roger-Vasselin and Igor Sijsling won the title, defeating Colin Fleming and Jonathan Marray in the final, 7–6^{(8–6)}, 6–3.

== Seeds ==
1. (Croatia) Ivan Dodig / (Brazil) Marcelo Melo (second round)
2. (Mexico) Santiago González / (United States) Scott Lipsky (first round)
3. (United Kingdom) Colin Fleming / (United Kingdom) Jonathan Marray (final)
4. (France) Édouard Roger-Vasselin / (Netherlands) Igor Sijsling (champions)

== Draw ==
=== Key ===
- Q = Qualifier
- WC = Wild card
- LL = Lucky loser
- Alt = Alternate
- SE = Special exempt
- PR = Protected ranking
- ITF = ITF entry
- JE = Junior exempt
- w/o = Walkover
- r = Retired
- d = Defaulted
- SR = Special ranking

=== Draw ===
First round
1	(Croatia) I Dodig (Brazil) M Melo	6	6
WC	(United States) C Harrison (United States) R Harrison	3	1
PR	(Israel) J Erlich (Israel) A Ram	4	6	[10]
(Chinese Taipei) Y-h Lu (Australia) M Matosevic	6	3	[4]
4	(France) É Roger-Vasselin (Netherlands) I Sijsling	7	6
WC	(United States) K King (Colombia) JC Spir	5	3
(United States) D Kudla (United States) M Russell
(Lithuania) R Berankis (Colombia) S Giraldo	w/o
(United States) J Blake (United States) J Sock	5	7^{7}	[10]
(Brazil) M Demoliner (Brazil) A Sá	7	6^{4}	[6]
(Russia) E Donskoy (Uzbekistan) D Istomin	3	6^{5}
3	(United Kingdom) C Fleming (United Kingdom) J Marray	6	7^{7}
(United States) R Ram (United Kingdom) K Skupski	6	6
(United Kingdom) D Inglot (Germany) F Moser	4	4
(Australia) C Guccione (Australia) L Hewitt	3	7^{7}	[10]
2	(Mexico) S González (United States) S Lipsky	6	6^{2}	[2]

Quarterfinals
1	(Croatia) I Dodig (Brazil) M Melo	5	6	[8]
PR	(Israel) J Erlich (Israel) A Ram	7	4	[10]
4	(France) É Roger-Vasselin (Netherlands) I Sijsling	7	7^{7}
(Lithuania) R Berankis (Colombia) S Giraldo	5	6^{5}
(United States) J Blake (United States) J Sock	3	2
3	(United Kingdom) C Fleming (United Kingdom) J Marray	6	6
(United States) R Ram (United Kingdom) K Skupski	1	2
(Australia) C Guccione (Australia) L Hewitt	6	6

Semifinals
PR	(Israel) J Erlich (Israel) A Ram	6	1	[7]
4	(France) É Roger-Vasselin (Netherlands) I Sijsling	3	6	[10]
3	(United Kingdom) C Fleming (United Kingdom) J Marray	6	7^{8}
(Australia) C Guccione (Australia) L Hewitt	4	6^{6}

Final
4	(France) É Roger-Vasselin (Netherlands) I Sijsling	7^{8}	6
3	(United Kingdom) C Fleming (United Kingdom) J Marray	6^{6}	3
