= 2010 Atlanta Tennis Championships =

- Date: July 19–25
- Edition: 23rd
- Category: ATP World Tour 250
- Draw: 28S / 16D
- Prize money: $531,000
- Surface: Hard / outdoor
- Location: Johns Creek, Georgia, US
- Venue: Atlanta Athletic Club

Champions

Singles
- (United States) Mardy Fish

Doubles
- (United States) Scott Lipsky / (United States) Rajeev Ram
| ← 2009 · | Atlanta Tennis Championships | · 2011 → |

The 2010 Atlanta Tennis Championships was a men's tennis tournament played on outdoor hard courts. It was the 23rd edition of the event known that year as the Atlanta Tennis Championships and was part of the ATP World Tour 250 series of the 2010 ATP World Tour. The Atlanta Tennis Championships was the first ATP stop of the 2010 US Open Series. 2010 was the first year this tournament was held in Atlanta. Previously, it had been hosted by Indianapolis. Mardy Fish won the singles title.

== Finals ==
=== Singles ===
(United States) Mardy Fish defeated (United States) John Isner, 4–6, 6–4, 7–6^{(7–4)}

- It was Fish's 2nd title of the year and 5th of his career.

=== Doubles ===
(United States) Scott Lipsky / (United States) Rajeev Ram defeated (India) Rohan Bopanna / (Belgium) Kristof Vliegen, 6–3, 6–7^{(4–7)}, [12–10]

== Singles main-draw entrants ==
=== Seeds ===
| Player | Nation | Ranking* | Seeding |
|---|---|---|---|
| Andy Roddick | USA | 9 | 1 |
| John Isner | USA | 18 | 2 |
| Lleyton Hewitt | AUS | 31 | 3 |
| Horacio Zeballos | ARG | 43 | 4 |
| Janko Tipsarević | SRB | 46 | 5 |
| Mardy Fish | USA | 49 | 6 |
| Xavier Malisse | BEL | 58 | 7 |
| Benjamin Becker | GER | 67 | 8 |

*Seedings based on the July 12, 2010 rankings and is subject to change.

=== Other entrants ===
The following players received wildcards into the singles main draw

- (United States) Andy Roddick
- (United Kingdom) James Ward
- (United States) Donald Young

The following players received entry from the qualifying draw:

- (Russia) Igor Kunitsyn
- (Australia) Nick Lindahl
- (Luxembourg) Gilles Müller
- (United States) Ryan Sweeting
