= 2013 BB&T Atlanta Open =

- Date: 20–28 July
- Edition: 26th
- Surface: Hard / outdoor
- Location: Atlantic Station, Atlanta, United States

Champions

Singles
- (United States) John Isner

Doubles
- (France) Édouard Roger-Vasselin / (Netherlands) Igor Sijsling
| ← 2012 · | Atlanta Open | · 2014 → |

The 2013 BB&T Atlanta Open was a professional tennis tournament played on hard courts. It was the 26th edition of the tournament, which was part of the 2013 ATP World Tour. It took place at Atlantic Station in Atlanta, United States between 20 and 28 July 2013. It was the men's first event of the 2013 US Open Series.

== Singles main-draw entrants ==
=== Seeds ===
| Country | Player | Rank^{1} | Seed |
|---|---|---|---|
| USA | John Isner | 21 | 1 |
| RSA | Kevin Anderson | 23 | 2 |
| CRO | Ivan Dodig | 37 | 3 |
| NED | Igor Sijsling | 55 | 4 |
| TPE | Lu Yen-hsun | 60 | 5 |
| USA | Mardy Fish | 62 | 6 |
| AUS | Lleyton Hewitt | 65 | 7 |
| RUS | Evgeny Donskoy | 66 | 8 |

- ^{1} Rankings are as of July 15, 2013

=== Other entrants ===
The following players received wildcards into the singles main draw:

- (United States) Christian Harrison
- (United States) Denis Kudla
- (United States) Rhyne Williams

The following player received entry as a special exempt:

- (Croatia) Ivo Karlović

The following players received entry from the qualifying draw:

- (Australia) Matthew Ebden
- (United States) Kevin King
- (United States) Tim Smyczek
- (Germany) Mischa Zverev

=== Withdrawals ===
Before the tournament

- (Czech Republic) Radek Štěpánek

=== Retirements ===
- (Croatia) Ivo Karlović (illness)
- (United States) Michael Russell (illness)

== Doubles main-draw entrants ==
=== Seeds ===
| Country | Player | Country | Player | Rank^{1} | Seed |
|---|---|---|---|---|---|
| CRO | Ivan Dodig | BRA | Marcelo Melo | 34 | 1 |
| MEX | Santiago González | USA | Scott Lipsky | 55 | 2 |
| GBR | Colin Fleming | GBR | Jonathan Marray | 62 | 3 |
| FRA | Édouard Roger-Vasselin | NED | Igor Sijsling | 89 | 4 |

- Rankings are as of July 15, 2013

=== Other entrants ===
The following pairs received wildcards into the doubles main draw:

- (United States) Christian Harrison / (United States) Ryan Harrison
- (United States) Kevin King / (Colombia) Juan Carlos Spir

=== Withdrawals ===
During the tournament

- (United States) Michael Russell (illness)

== Finals ==
=== Singles ===
- (United States) John Isner defeated (South Africa) Kevin Anderson, 6–7^{(3–7)}, 7–6^{(7–2)}, 7–6^{(7–2)}.

=== Doubles ===
- (France) Édouard Roger-Vasselin / (Netherlands) Igor Sijsling defeated (United Kingdom) Colin Fleming / (United Kingdom) Jonathan Marray, 7–6^{(8–6)}, 6–3
