= Andy Roddick Foundation =

US non-profit organization

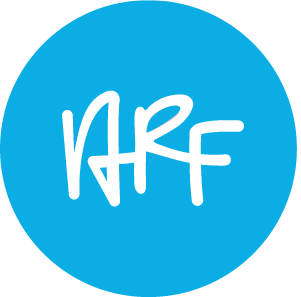
- Abbreviation: ARF
- Formation: 2000
- Type: Youth organization
- Legal status: Non-profit organization
- Headquarters: Austin, Texas
- Region served: United States
- Website: www.arfoundation.org

The Andy Roddick Foundation is a nonprofit organisation founded by tennis player Andy Roddick in 2000. The organisation aims to provide lower-income students with summer and afterschool programs.

== History ==
The foundation was founded in 2000, when Roddick was 18. At the time, he was the top ranked junior tennis player worldwide. In 2012, the Andy Roddick Foundation moved to Austin, Texas.
