= 2011 Atlanta Tennis Championships =

- Date: July 18–24
- Edition: 24th
- Category: World Tour 250
- Draw: 28S / 16D
- Prize money: $531,000
- Surface: Hard / outdoor
- Location: Norcross, Georgia, US
- Venue: Racquet Club of the South

Champions

Singles
- (United States) Mardy Fish

Doubles
- (United States) Alex Bogomolov Jr. / (Australia) Matthew Ebden
← 2010 ·	Atlanta Tennis Championships	· 2012 →

The 2011 Atlanta Tennis Championships was a men's tennis tournament played on outdoor hard courts. It was the 24th edition of the event known that year as the Atlanta Tennis Championships and was part of the ATP World Tour 250 series of the 2011 ATP World Tour. The Atlanta Tennis Championships was the first ATP stop of the 2011 US Open Series. First-seeded Mardy Fish won the singles title.

== ATP entrants ==
=== Seeds ===
Country	Player	Ranking*	Seeding
USA	Mardy Fish	9	1
RSA	Kevin Anderson	35	2
USA	John Isner	36	3
BEL	Xavier Malisse	40	4
BUL	Grigor Dimitrov	59	5
RUS	Igor Kunitsyn	62	6
USA	Alex Bogomolov Jr.	63	7
IND	Somdev Devvarman	65	8

*Seedings based on the July 11, 2011 rankings.

=== Other entrants ===
The following players received wildcards into the singles main draw:

- (United States) Robby Ginepri
- (Germany) Tommy Haas
- (United States) Donald Young

The following players received entry from the qualifying draw:

- (Australia) Marinko Matosevic
- (United States) Rajeev Ram
- (United States) Phillip Simmonds
- (Japan) Yūichi Sugita

== Finals ==
=== Singles ===
(United States) Mardy Fish defeated (United States) John Isner, 3–6, 7–6^{(8–6)}, 6–2.

- It was Fish's first title of the year, sixth career title, and second consecutive title at the event.

=== Doubles ===
(United States) Alex Bogomolov Jr. / (Australia) Matthew Ebden defeated (Germany) Matthias Bachinger / (Germany) Frank Moser, 3–6, 7–5, [10–8].
