= 2012 BB&T Atlanta Open =

- Date: July 16–22
- Edition: 25th
- Category: World Tour 250
- Draw: 28S / 16D
- Prize money: $477,900
- Surface: Hard / outdoor
- Location: Atlantic Station, Atlanta, United States

Champions

Singles
- (United States) Andy Roddick

Doubles
- (Australia) Matthew Ebden / (United States) Ryan Harrison
← 2011 ·	Atlanta Open	· 2013 →

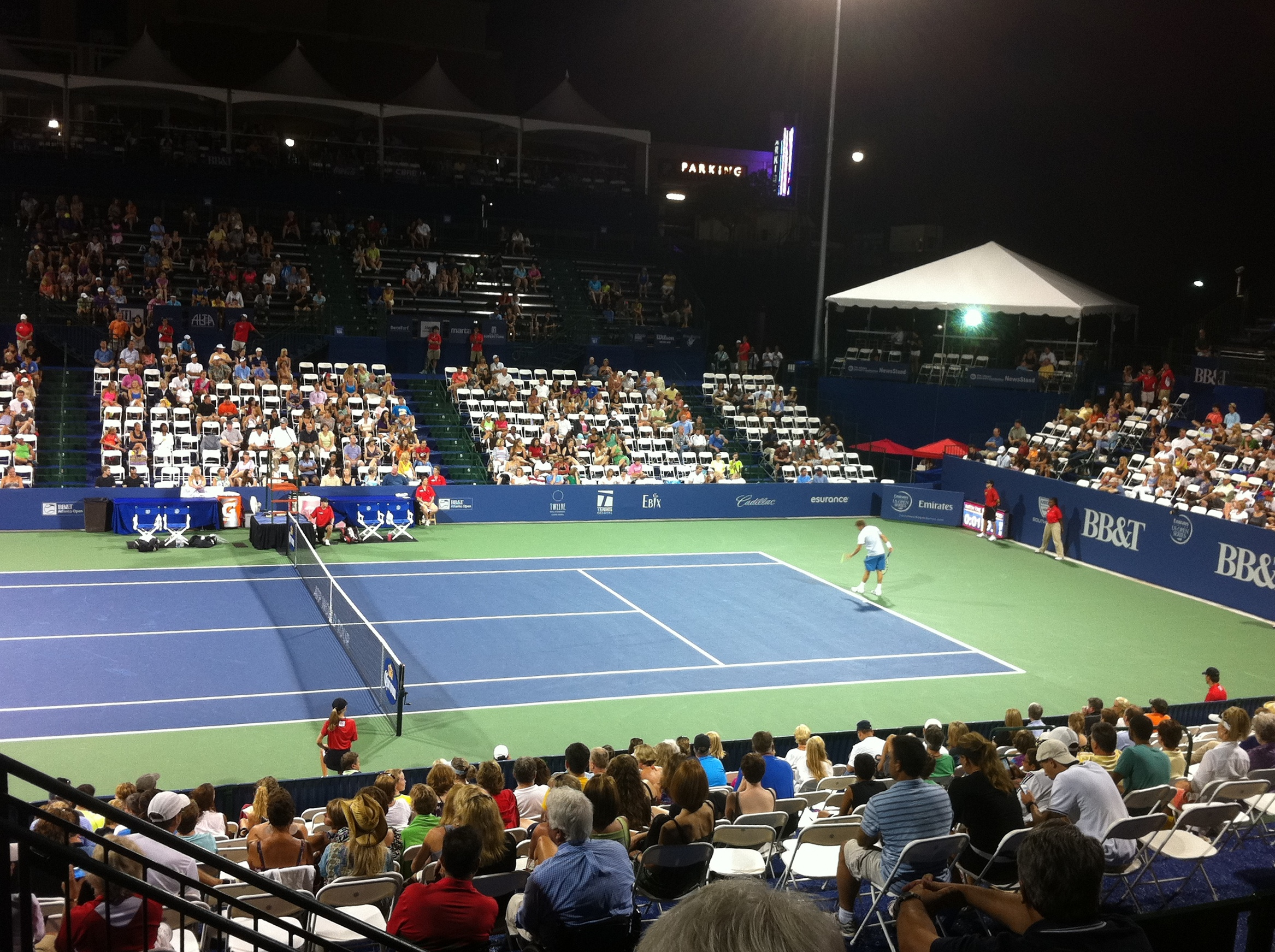
A player preparing to serve during the 2012 BB&T Atlanta Open

The 2012 BB&T Atlanta Open was a professional men's tennis tournament played on hard courts. It was the 25th edition of the tournament which was part of the 2012 ATP World Tour. It took place at Atlantic Station in Atlanta, United States between July 16 and July 22, 2012. It was the men's first event of the 2012 US Open Series. Fourth-seeded Andy Roddick won the singles title.

== Singles main-draw entrants ==
=== Seeds ===
Country	Player	Rank^{1}	Seed
USA	John Isner	11	1
USA	Mardy Fish	13	2
JPN	Kei Nishikori	18	3
USA	Andy Roddick	27	4
RSA	Kevin Anderson	33	5
USA	Ryan Harrison	48	6
RUS	Alex Bogomolov Jr.	50	7
JPN	Go Soeda	54	8

- ^{1} Rankings are as of July 9, 2012

=== Other entrants ===
The following players received wildcards into the singles main draw:

- (United States) Brian Baker
- (United States) Steve Johnson
- (United States) Jack Sock

The following players received entry as a special exempt into the singles main draw:

- (United States) Rajeev Ram

The following players received entry from the qualifying draw:

- (Belgium) Ruben Bemelmans
- (Lithuania) Ričardas Berankis
- (Ukraine) Sergei Bubka
- (United States) Alex Kuznetsov

=== Withdrawals ===
- (Slovakia) Lukáš Lacko

=== Retirements ===
- (United States) Mardy Fish (right ankle injury)

== Doubles main-draw entrants ==
=== Seeds ===
Country	Player	Country	Player	Rank^{1}	Seed
GBR	Colin Fleming	GBR	Ross Hutchins	64	1
MEX	Santiago González	USA	Scott Lipsky	71	2
PHI	Treat Conrad Huey	GBR	Dominic Inglot	122	3
GBR	Jamie Delgado	GBR	Ken Skupski	147	4

- Rankings are as of July 9, 2012

=== Other entrants ===
The following pairs received wildcards into the doubles main draw:

- (United States) Steve Johnson / (United States) Jack Sock
- (United States) Kevin King / (United States) Ignacio Taboada

=== Withdrawals ===
- (Russia) Alex Bogomolov Jr. (shoulder injury)

== Finals ==
=== Singles ===
(United States) Andy Roddick defeated (Luxembourg) Gilles Müller, 1–6, 7–6(2), 6–2

=== Doubles ===
(Australia) Matthew Ebden / (United States) Ryan Harrison defeated (Belgium) Xavier Malisse / (United States) Michael Russell, 6–3, 3–6, [10–6]
