= Andy Roddick =

American tennis player (born 1982)

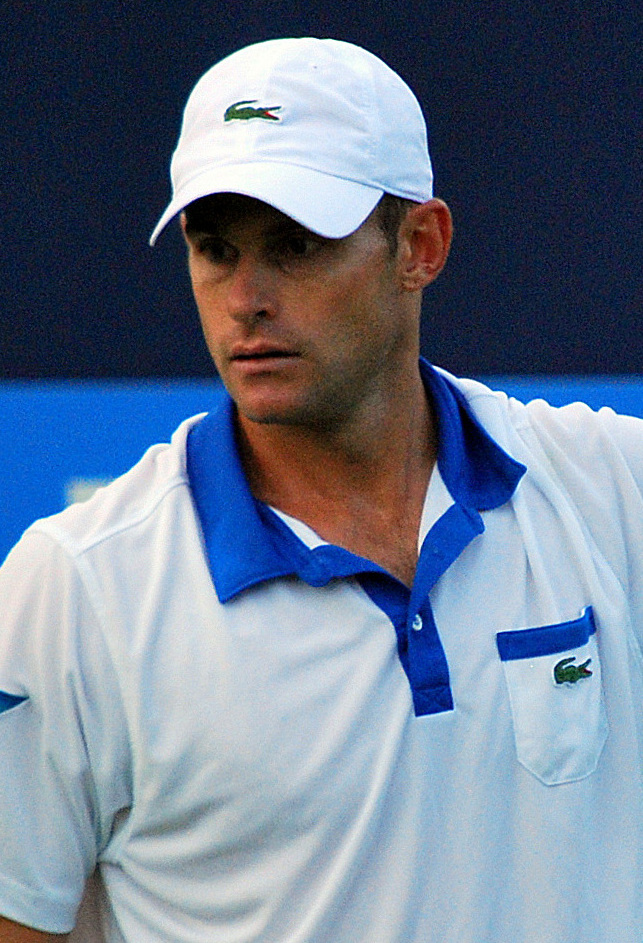
- Roddick in 2012
- Full name: Andrew Stephen Roddick
- Country (sports): United States
- Born: August 30, 1982 (age 44) Omaha, Nebraska, U.S.
- Height: 6 ft 2 in (1.88 m)
- Turned pro: 2000
- Retired: Singles: 2012; Doubles: 2015
- Plays: Right-handed (two-handed backhand)
- Coach: Tarik Benhabiles (1999–2003); Brad Gilbert (2003–2004); Dean Goldfine (2004–2006); Jimmy Connors (2006–2008); John Roddick; Larry Stefanki (2008–2012)
- Prize money: US$20,640,030: 35th all-time leader in earnings
- Int. Tennis HoF: 2017 (member page)

Singles
- Career record: 612–213 (74.2%)
- Career titles: 32
- Highest ranking: No. 1 (November 3, 2003)

Grand Slam singles results
- Australian Open: SF (2003, 2005, 2007, 2009)
- French Open: 4R (2009)
- Wimbledon: F (2004, 2005, 2009)
- US Open: W (2003)

Other tournaments
- Tour Finals: SF (2003, 2004, 2007)
- Olympic Games: 3R (2004)

Doubles
- Career record: 68–51 (57.1%)
- Career titles: 4
- Highest ranking: No. 50 (January 11, 2010)

Grand Slam doubles results
- Australian Open: 1R (2008)
- French Open: 1R (2001)
- Wimbledon: 1R (2001)
- US Open: 2R (1999, 2000)

Team competitions
- Davis Cup: W (2007)
- Spouse: Brooklyn Decker (m. 2009)
- Children: 2

Andrew Stephen Roddick (born August 30, 1982) is an American former professional tennis player. He was ranked as the world No. 1 in men's singles by the Association of Tennis Professionals (ATP) for 13 weeks, including as the year-end No. 1 in 2003. Roddick won 32 ATP Tour-level singles titles, including a major at the 2003 US Open and five Masters events, and led the United States to the 2007 Davis Cup title. He was the runner-up at four other majors (Wimbledon in 2004, 2005, and 2009, and the US Open in 2006), losing to rival Roger Federer each time.

Roddick was ranked in the year-end top 10 for nine consecutive years (2002–2010), first reaching the No. 1 spot in 2003. Roddick retired from the sport following the 2012 US Open to focus on his work at the Andy Roddick Foundation. In retirement, Roddick played for the Austin Aces in World Team Tennis in 2015. He was also the 2015 and 2017 champion of the QQQ Champions Series. Roddick was inducted into the International Tennis Hall of Fame in 2017. He is married to swimwear model and actress Brooklyn Decker.

== Early life ==
Roddick was born on August 30, 1982, in Omaha, Nebraska, the youngest son of Blanche (née Corell), a school teacher, and Jerry Roddick, a businessman. Roddick has two older brothers, Lawrence and John, who were both promising tennis players at a young age.

Roddick lived in Austin, Texas, from ages 4 to 11, and then moved to Boca Raton, Florida, in the interest of his brother's tennis career, attending SEK Boca Prep International School, and graduating in 2000. Roddick also took high school classes online through the University of Nebraska High School.

== Career ==
=== 1997–2000: Juniors ===
Roddick considered quitting competitive tennis at age 17 when he had a losing streak in the juniors. His coach Tarik Benhabiles talked him into giving tennis four more months of undivided attention. Roddick finished as the No. 6 junior in the U.S. in 1999, and as the No. 1 junior in the world in 2000. He won six world junior singles titles and seven world junior doubles titles, and won the US Open and Australian Open junior singles titles in 2000.

=== 2000–2002: Breakthrough ===
In March in Miami, in the first round, Roddick had his first ATP level victory as he beat No. 41 Fernando Vicente of Spain. In August in Washington, D.C., he beat No. 30 Fabrice Santoro of France. Roddick played the Banana Bowl in the city of São Paulo and won, beating Joachim Johansson in the final. Roddick also won the Australian Junior Open, defeating Mario Ančić in the final.

Entering the pros in 2001 at the age of 18, Roddick quickly showed his promise when he defeated 7-time Wimbledon champion and world No. 4 Pete Sampras in the third round of the Miami Masters. Later that year, he dispatched then World No. 1 Gustavo Kuerten of Brazil in August. Earlier, at the 2001 French Open, Roddick defeated a French Open champion, Michael Chang, in a five set battle in the second round. During the ensuing Wimbledon, he further showed potential by taking a set from eventual winner Goran Ivanišević.

=== 2003: US Open title and world No. 1 ===
Roddick's breakthrough year was 2003, in which he defeated Younes El Aynaoui in the quarterfinals of the 2003 Australian Open. Roddick and the Moroccan battled for five hours, with the fifth set (21–19 in favor of Roddick) at the time the longest fifth set in a Grand Slam tournament during the open era, at 2 hours and 23 minutes. Despite a lackluster French Open, Roddick enjoyed success in the United Kingdom by winning Queen's Club, beating No. 2 Andre Agassi on a final set tie break along the way, and reaching the Wimbledon semifinals, where he lost to eventual champion Roger Federer in straight sets. He avenged that loss in August, beating then No. 3 Federer in Montreal in a third set tie break. It is one of three times that Roddick defeated Federer in an official ATP tournament.

Roddick's hard-court record in 2003 included his first Masters Series titles—coming at Canada and Cincinnati—and his only Grand Slam title. At the 2003 US Open, Roddick rallied from two sets down and a match point in the semifinals to beat David Nalbandian of Argentina in five sets. He then defeated No. 3 Juan Carlos Ferrero in the final in straight sets to become the men's singles US Open Champion. At the Tennis Masters Cup in Houston, he defeated No. 7 Carlos Moyá of Spain, and No. 4 Guillermo Coria of Argentina, before losing to Roger Federer in the semifinals. By the end of the year, at age 21, he was ranked No. 1, the first American to finish a year at No. 1 since Andre Agassi in 1999.

=== 2004: First Wimbledon final ===
Roddick's reign at No. 1 ended the following February, when Roger Federer ascended to the top position, after winning his first Australian Open; the 2004 Australian Open would be the only time in Roddick's career that he was the No. 1 seed in a Grand Slam. In April, Roddick again beat No. 6 Moyá. In June, Roddick advanced to his first Wimbledon final after taking the first set from defending champion Federer, losing in four sets. Roddick was knocked out during the 2004 US Open in a five-set quarterfinal against another big server, Joachim Johansson. In September, he beat No. 9 Marat Safin of Russia in Bangkok. At the 2004 Summer Olympics, Roddick lost to Chilean Fernando González, the eventual bronze medal winner, in the third round. In November he beat No. 7 Tim Henman of Great Britain, No. 4 Safin, and No. 6 Guillermo Coria. Later that year, Roddick teamed up with Mardy Fish and Bob and Mike Bryan on the U.S. Davis Cup team that lost to Spain in the final in Seville. Roddick lost his singles match against Rafael Nadal, who would in the following year win the French Open. Towards the end of 2004, Roddick fired his coach of 18 months, Brad Gilbert, and hired assistant Davis Cup coach Dean Goldfine. Roddick finished 2004 ranked as the world No. 2, U.S. No. 1, and player with the most aces (2,017). In 2004, Roddick saved fellow tennis player Sjeng Schalken and other guests (including close friends Ben Campezi and Dean Monroe) from a hotel fire.

=== 2005: Second Wimbledon final ===
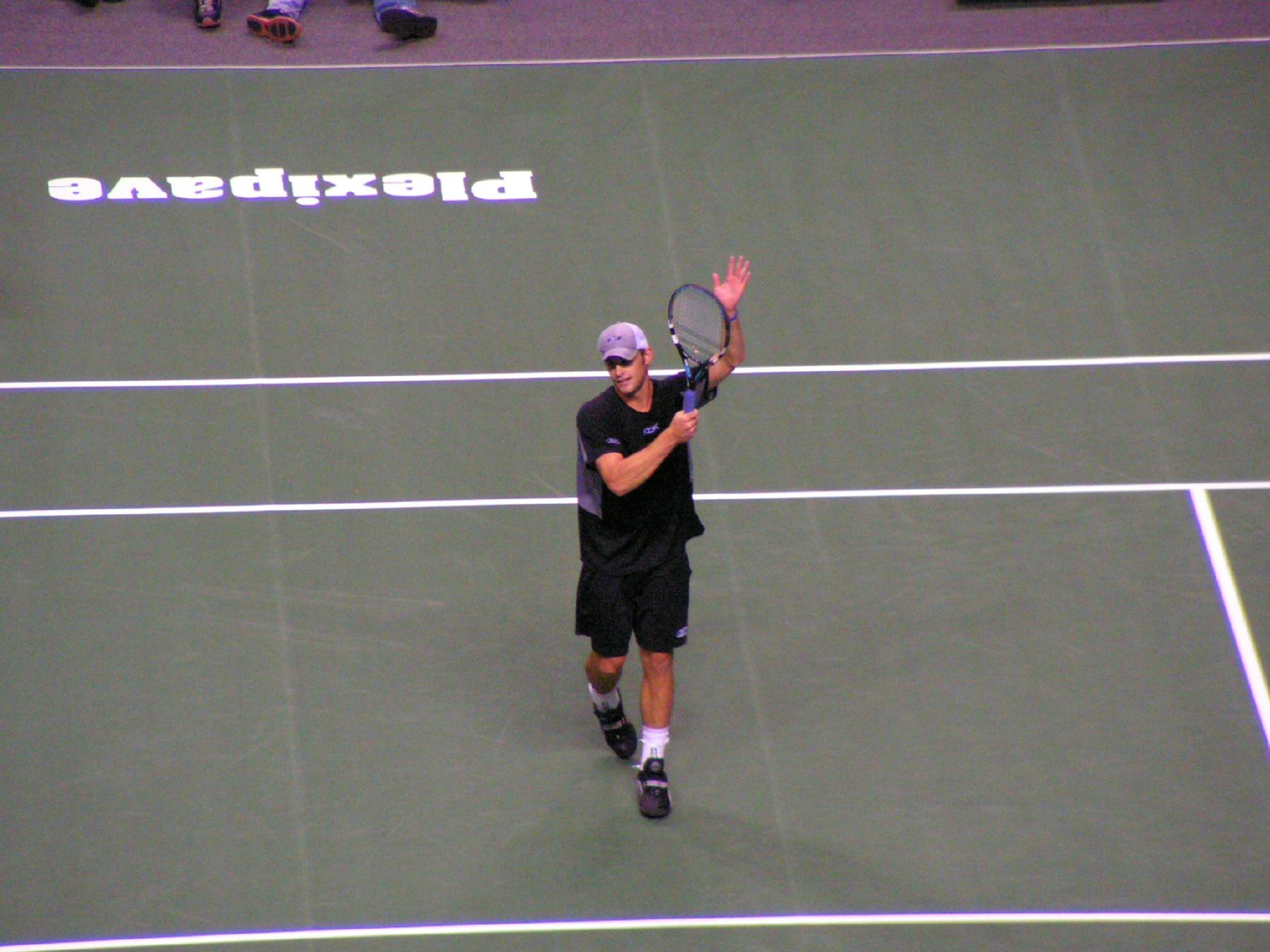
Roddick on his way to the first tournament win of 2005

Roddick's first 2005 tournament victory was the SAP Open in San Jose, California, where he became the first to win the event in consecutive years since Mark Philippoussis in 1999 and 2000. The top-seeded Roddick defeated Cyril Saulnier in 50 minutes, the event's first championship shutout set since Arthur Ashe beat Guillermo Vilas in 1975. In March, he defeated No. 7 Carlos Moyá. In April, Roddick won the U.S. Men's Claycourt Championships, reclaiming the title he won in 2001 and 2002. (He lost in 2003 to Agassi, and in 2004 to Tommy Haas.) At the Rome Masters in May, Roddick had match point in the round of 16 against Spain's Fernando Verdasco. Verdasco was attempting to save the match point on his second serve, when the linesman erroneously called the serve out. If this call had held, Roddick would have won the match. Roddick motioned to the umpire, pointing to the clear ball mark on the clay indicating that the ball was in, and the call was consequently changed. Verdasco went on to win the match. At the 2005 French Open, Roddick lost to unseeded Argentine José Acasuso in the second round, and at Wimbledon, Roddick lost to Federer in the final for the second consecutive year. In August, he defeated No. 3 Lleyton Hewitt at the Masters Series tournament in Cincinnati. At the US Open, Roddick was defeated by No. 70 Gilles Müller in the first round. Roddick's most recent US Open first-round loss had been in 2000. At the Grand Prix de Tennis de Lyon, Roddick defeated Gaël Monfils to wrap up a tournament without losing a set or getting his serve broken.

=== 2006: US Open final ===
Roddick's first ATP event of the year was the Australian Open. There, he reached the fourth round, before being upset by unseeded and eventual finalist, Marcos Baghdatis. At the French Open, Roddick retired in the first round, after sustaining a foot injury during the match. Two weeks later at Wimbledon, Roddick was upset in the third round by British hopeful Andy Murray. This loss caused Roddick to fall below the top 10 for the first time since 2002. After Wimbledon, Roddick began working with a new coach, tennis legend Jimmy Connors. In his first event with his new coach, Roddick reached the final of Indianapolis, before losing to good friend and fellow American, James Blake. His resurgence finally came at the Cincinnati Masters, where he won the event by defeating Juan Carlos Ferrero in the final, making this the first masters event he won since 2004. At the US Open, Roddick easily won his first two matches against Florent Serra and Kristian Pless. He then won a five-set match against Fernando Verdasco. Next, he beat Benjamin Becker, who was coming off a huge win against recently retired Andre Agassi. In the quarterfinals, Roddick beat Lleyton Hewitt, avenging his loss in 2001, in straight sets. Now in the semifinals for the first time since he won in 2003, Roddick beat Mikhail Youzhny in four sets. In the finals of a Grand Slam for the first time since Wimbledon a year prior, Roddick lost to No. 1 Federer in four sets. He then qualified for the year-ending Tennis Masters Cup, where he defeated No. 4 Ivan Ljubičić of Croatia, but lost in the round robin to No. 1 Federer in a tough three-set battle, despite holding three match points in the second-set tiebreaker.

=== 2007: Davis Cup victory ===
At the Australian Open in his first-round match, he lost a marathon first-set tiebreak 20–18, but eventually won the match in four sets against wild card Jo-Wilfried Tsonga. Roddick defeated Marat Safin in the third round, Mario Ančić in a five-set fourth-round match and Mardy Fish in the quarterfinals. His run was ended in the semifinals by No. 1 Federer, who defeated him in straight sets, making his head-to-head record against Federer 1–13. In first-round Davis Cup action, Roddick helped the US defeat the Czech Republic, winning his singles matches against Ivo Minář and Tomáš Berdych. Roddick bowed out to Andy Murray in the semifinals of the SAP Open in San Jose, California and then defeated Murray in the semifinals of the Regions Morgan Keegan Championships and the Cellular South Cup in Memphis, Tennessee, before losing in the final to defending champion Tommy Haas. Reaching the final, however, enabled Roddick to overtake Nikolay Davydenko for the No. 3 position, his first week inside the top three since March 6, 2006. At Pacific Life Open in Indian Wells, California Roddick beat No. 8 Ivan Ljubičić, but lost to No. 2 Rafael Nadal in the semifinals.

Roddick then retired in the quarters of Miami Masters against Andy Murray due to a left hamstring injury. Roddick helped the U.S. defeat Spain and advance to the Davis Cup semifinals, winning his lone singles match against Fernando Verdasco. However, Roddick re-aggravated his hamstring injury during the Davis Cup tie, and was subsequently forced to pull out of the U.S. Men's Clay Court Championships in Houston, Texas. His next tournament was the Internazionali d'Italia, where lost to Juan Ignacio Chela in the third round. At the French Open he was eliminated in the first round by Igor Andreev in four sets. Roddick was victorious at the Stella Artois Championships for the fourth time, when he defeated Nicolas Mahut in the final. At Wimbledon, Roddick lost in five close sets to Richard Gasquet in the quarter finals.

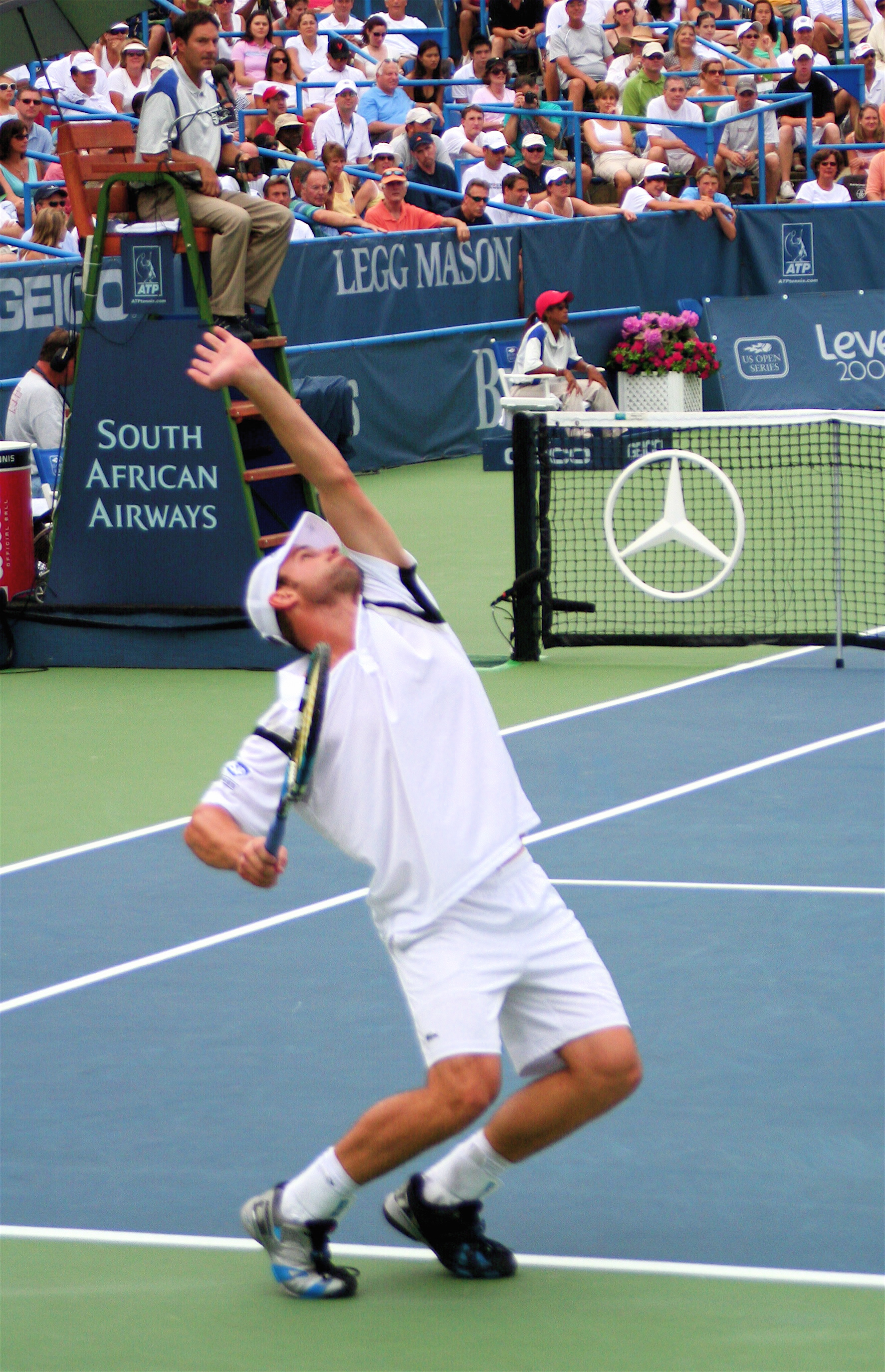
Roddick in Washington, 2007

During the summer hard-court season, Roddick played four tournaments in four weeks. Roddick lost in the semifinals of the Indianapolis Tennis Championships to Frank Dancevic. Roddick claimed his second ATP title of the year by winning the Legg Mason Tennis Classic in Washington, D.C. for the third time, when he beat John Isner. He then lost in the quarterfinals of the Rogers Cup in Montreal to Novak Djokovic, and in the third round of the Western & Southern Financial Group Masters tournament in Cincinnati to David Ferrer. At the US Open, Roddick defeated Gimelstob in the first round. He won his next three matches, one in straight sets and the other two when his opponent retired. In the quarterfinals, Roddick once again lost to Federer, bringing his head-to-head record with Federer 1–14.

At Lyon, France, Roddick lost in the first round to Fabrice Santoro. Roddick then withdrew from the Paris Masters, incurring a $22,600 fine for not fulfilling his media obligations at the tournament. At the season-ending Tennis Masters Cup in Shanghai, Roddick defeated No. 4 Nikolay Davydenko in his first round-robin match, and then defeated No. 7 Fernando González to become the first player to qualify for the semifinals of the tournament. In his final round-robin match, Roddick lost once again to Federer for the 15th time in 16 career matches. In the semifinals, Roddick lost to sixth seed David Ferrer. This was Roddick's third semifinal finish in five years at the Tennis Masters Cup (he reached the semifinals in 2003 and 2004, withdrew in 2005, and failed to advance to the semifinals in 2006 after a 1–2 round-robin record). Roddick finished the year by helping the U.S. defeat Russia and win the 2007 Davis Cup, its 32nd Davis Cup victory, but first since 1995. Roddick won his rubber against Dmitry Tursunov.

=== 2008: Series of injuries ===
Roddick beat Ivan Ljubičić, Safin and Marcos Baghdatis to win the AAMI Kooyong Classic for the third consecutive year. Roddick At the Australian Open he beat Lukáš Dlouhý and Michael Berrer and lost to the 29th seed Philipp Kohlschreiber in the third round in five sets. Despite losing, Roddick served a career-high of 42 aces in the match. Roddick won his 24th career title and his third title of the year at the SAP Open in San Jose, California, defeating Radek Štěpánek in straight sets. At the Dubai Tennis Championships he made it to the semifinals beating No. 2 Rafael Nadal, his first victory over Nadal since the second round of the 2004 US Open. The win also marked Roddick's first victory over a player ranked in the top two since June 2003. He beat No. 3 and 2008 Australian Open singles champion Novak Djokovic in the semifinal. In the final he defeated Feliciano López to win his 25th career title. He never lost his serve during the entire tournament.

Following Roddick's quarterfinal match in Dubai, he announced that he had split with his coach of two years, Jimmy Connors. Connors had resigned a week earlier, saying he wanted to spend more time with his family. Roddick would continue to be coached by his brother, John Roddick. He then fell to No. 2 Tommy Haas at the Pacific Life Open in the second round. At the 2008 Sony Ericsson Open, Roddick advanced to the semifinals after defeating No. 1 Roger Federer an hour after proposing to Brooklyn Decker, bringing his head-to-head record against Federer to 2–15. Roddick improved to 3–0 against top-3 players in 2008. Roddick lost in the semifinals to Nikolay Davydenko. Roddick reached the semifinals at Rome, where he retired against Stanislas Wawrinka in the pair's first encounter, due to a back injury.

Roddick was forced to pull out of the French Open due to a shoulder injury (later diagnosed as an inflammation of the rotator cuff). His first tournament after the shoulder injury was the Artois Championship, where he was the defending champion. Roddick defeated Mardy Fish and Andy Murray, before losing to eventual champion Rafael Nadal in the semifinals. At Wimbledon, Roddick was beaten by Janko Tipsarević in the second round. This was his earliest exit at Wimbledon. Roddick was beaten at the Rogers Cup in the third round by Marin Čilić. He was then forced to pull out of the Cincinnati Masters following a neck injury, which he said may have been caused by a poor sleeping posture. At Los Angeles, Roddick lost to Juan Martín del Potro in the final. At the US Open, Roddick defeated Fabrice Santoro, Ernests Gulbis, Andreas Seppi, and Fernando González. In the quarterfinals, Roddick lost to No. 3 Novak Djokovic, bringing his head-to-head record with Djokovic to 1–2.

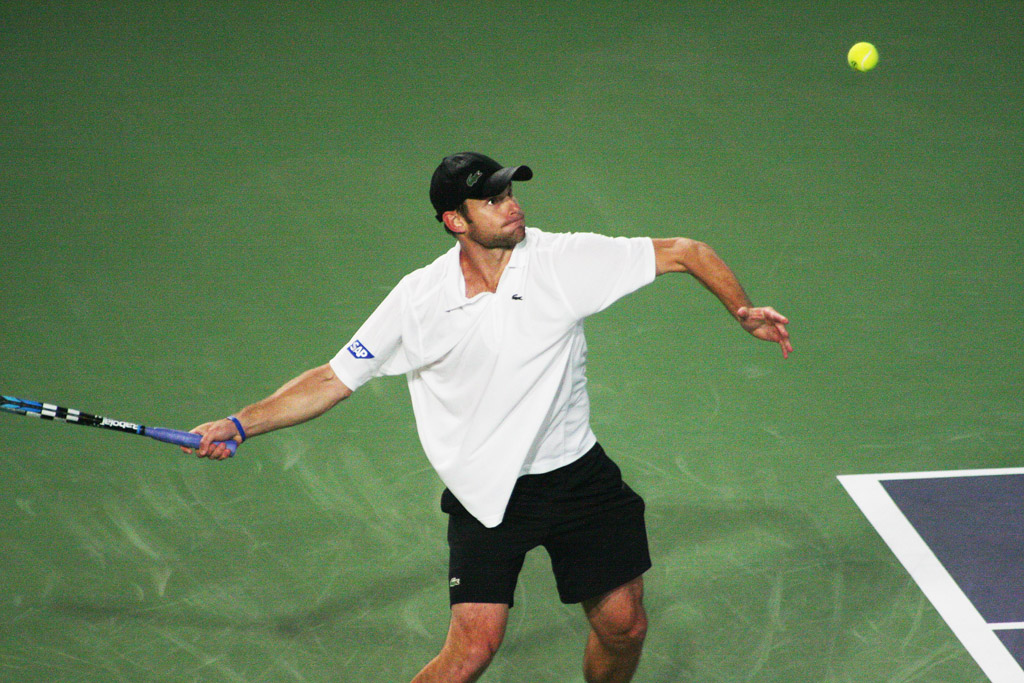
Capturing the 26th title of his career in China, 2008

Roddick captured his 26th ATP title in Beijing at the China Open in September, beating Dudi Sela in the final. In the third round of the Madrid Masters, he lost to Gaël Monfils in three sets. Two weeks later, Roddick reached the quarterfinals of the Paris Masters by defeating Gilles Simon, before losing to Jo-Wilfried Tsonga. Due to his performance in the tournament, Roddick qualified for the season-ending Tennis Masters Cup. At the Masters Cup in Shanghai, he played Andy Murray in his first round-robin match and lost. He was then scheduled to play Roger Federer, but retired due to an ankle injury and was replaced by Radek Štěpánek.

=== 2009: Longest Wimbledon final ===
Roddick hired Larry Stefanki as his new coach and started working with him on December 1, 2008. Stefanki had previously trained John McEnroe, Marcelo Ríos, Yevgeny Kafelnikov, Fernando González, and Tim Henman. Roddick began official tournament competition at the Qatar ExxonMobil Open. He defeated Gaël Monfils in the semifinals, before losing to Andy Murray in the final. At the 2009 Australian Open, Djokovic retired in the fourth set in the quarters while trailing, which allowed Roddick to reach the fourth Australian Open semifinal of his career. Roddick was defeated there by eventual runner-up Roger Federer in straight sets.

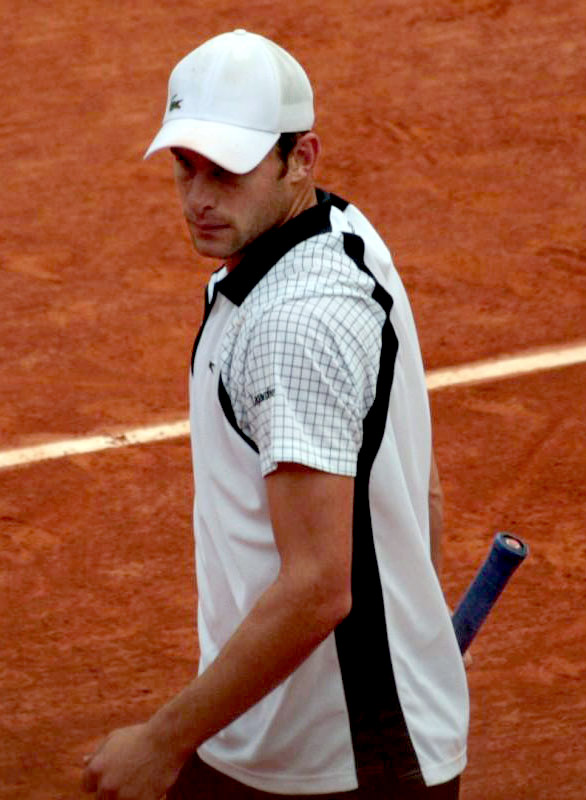
Roddick reached the fourth round of the French Open for the first time.

At SAP Open, he beat Tommy Haas in the quarterfinals and lost in semifinals to Radek Štěpánek. At the Regions Morgan Keegan Championships, Roddick beat Lleyton Hewitt in the semifinals and Štěpánek in the final. Roddick chose not to defend his Dubai title, with prize money of $2 million, to protest the refusal of the United Arab Emirates to grant Israeli Shahar Pe'er a visa for the Women's Tennis Association event. "I really didn't agree with what went on over there", Roddick said. At BNP Paribas Open in Indian Wells he defeated defending champion Novak Djokovic in the quarterfinals before losing to world No. 1 Rafael Nadal in the semifinals. However, he won the doubles title with partner Mardy Fish. It was his fourth doubles title overall and his second partnering Fish. At the Miami Masters, Roddick beat Gaël Monfils in the fourth round but lost to Roger Federer in the quarterfinals.

After a break from tournament tennis to get married, Roddick returned to action at the ATP World Tour Masters 1000 clay-court event in Madrid. In his first match, Roddick survived two match points in the second-set tiebreaker to defeat Tommy Haas. In the quarterfinals, Roddick again lost to Federer. Roddick had his career-best result at the French Open, when he defeated Marc Gicquel in the third round. He lost in the fourth round to Monfils.

A twisted ankle forced Roddick to retire from his semifinal against James Blake at 4–4 during the Aegon Championships. At Wimbledon, Roddick defeated Lleyton Hewitt in the quarterfinals, serving a career-high of 43 aces, and third-seeded Andy Murray in the semifinals. He then lost to Federer for the third time in a Wimbledon final with a fifth set reaching 14–16, and he was praised for his performance. Even though Roddick lost this match, he set a record for number of games won in a Wimbledon final at 39. This was his fourth meeting with Federer in a Grand Slam final, all won by Federer. The match set records for the longest men's Grand Slam final in history at 77 games and fifth set in a men's Grand Slam final. Following the match, when asked to elaborate on his marathon performance, Roddick replied, "I lost." On the strength of his Wimbledon performance, Roddick returned to the top five on July 13, 2009.

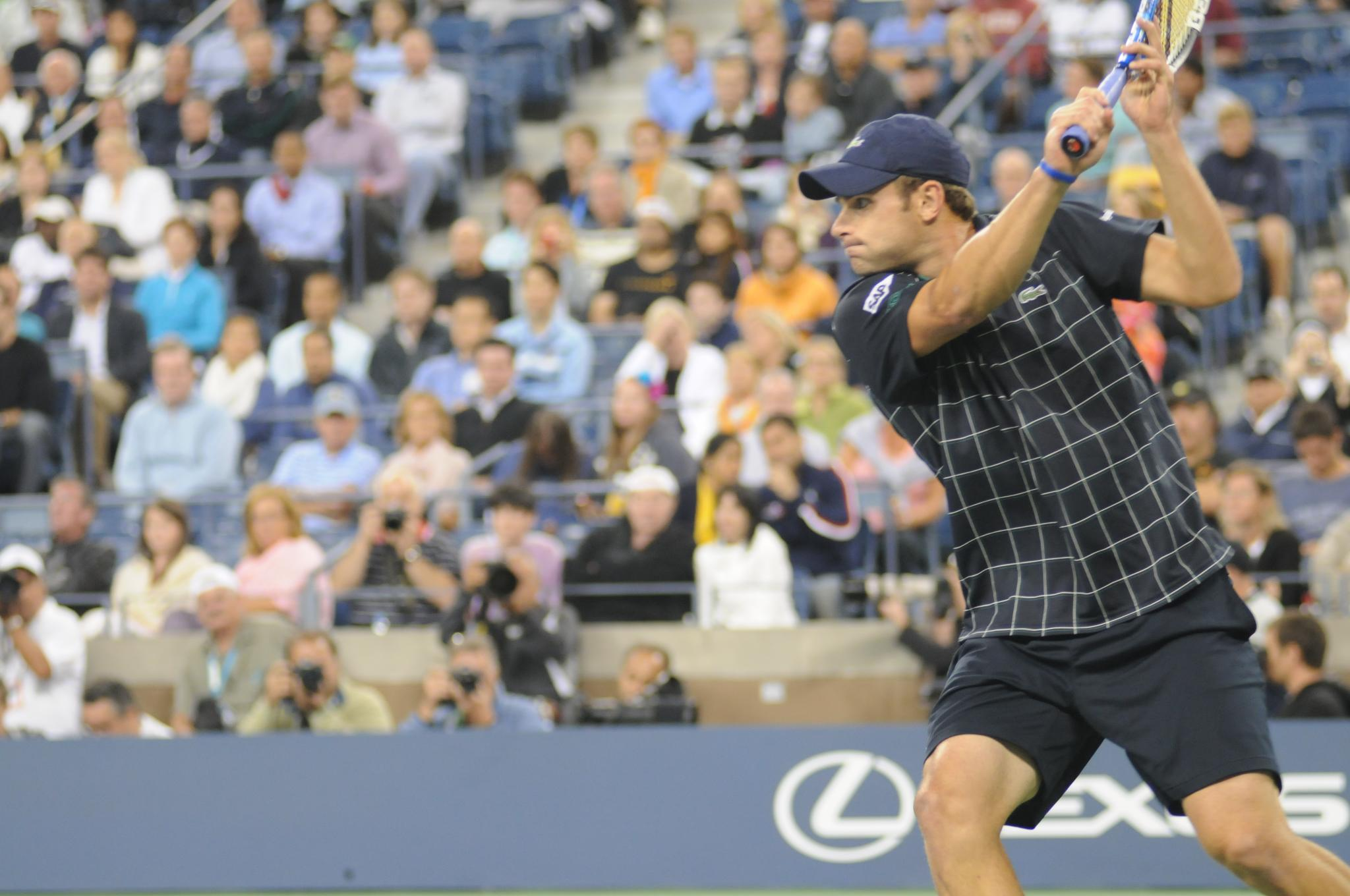
Roddick reached the final of Wimbledon but had a disappointing US Open.

At the Legg Mason Tennis Classic he lost in the final to defending champion Juan Martín del Potro, despite saving three match points. At Rogers Cup, he defeated No. 4 Novak Djokovic in the quarter finals, improving his career record against Djokovic to 4–2 (3–0 in 2009). He then lost to Juan Martín del Potro in the semifinals, despite having a match point. The loss dropped his career record against del Potro to 0–3. At Cincinnati, he lost to Sam Querrey in his first match. Roddick entered the US Open as the fifth seed. He defeated Björn Phau and Marc Gicquel before losing to John Isner in the third round. He lost his serve only once during the match, as was the case in the Wimbledon final.

At China Open in Beijing, he was defeated in the first round by qualifier and No. 143 Łukasz Kubot. He and Mark Knowles reached the doubles final, losing to Bob and Mike Bryan. Roddick retired from his first-round match at the 2009 Shanghai Masters against Stanislas Wawrinka while leading 4–3. It was later announced that Roddick would return to the United States to seek medical advice on a left-knee injury. He qualified for the Year-End Masters in London, securing the sixth spot. However, Roddick withdrew from the 2009 Valencia Open 500, the 2009 BNP Paribas Masters, and the 2009 Barclays ATP World Tour Finals due to the injury he suffered at the Shanghai Masters. He finished 2009 as the No. 7 in the world.

=== 2010: Fifth Masters title ===
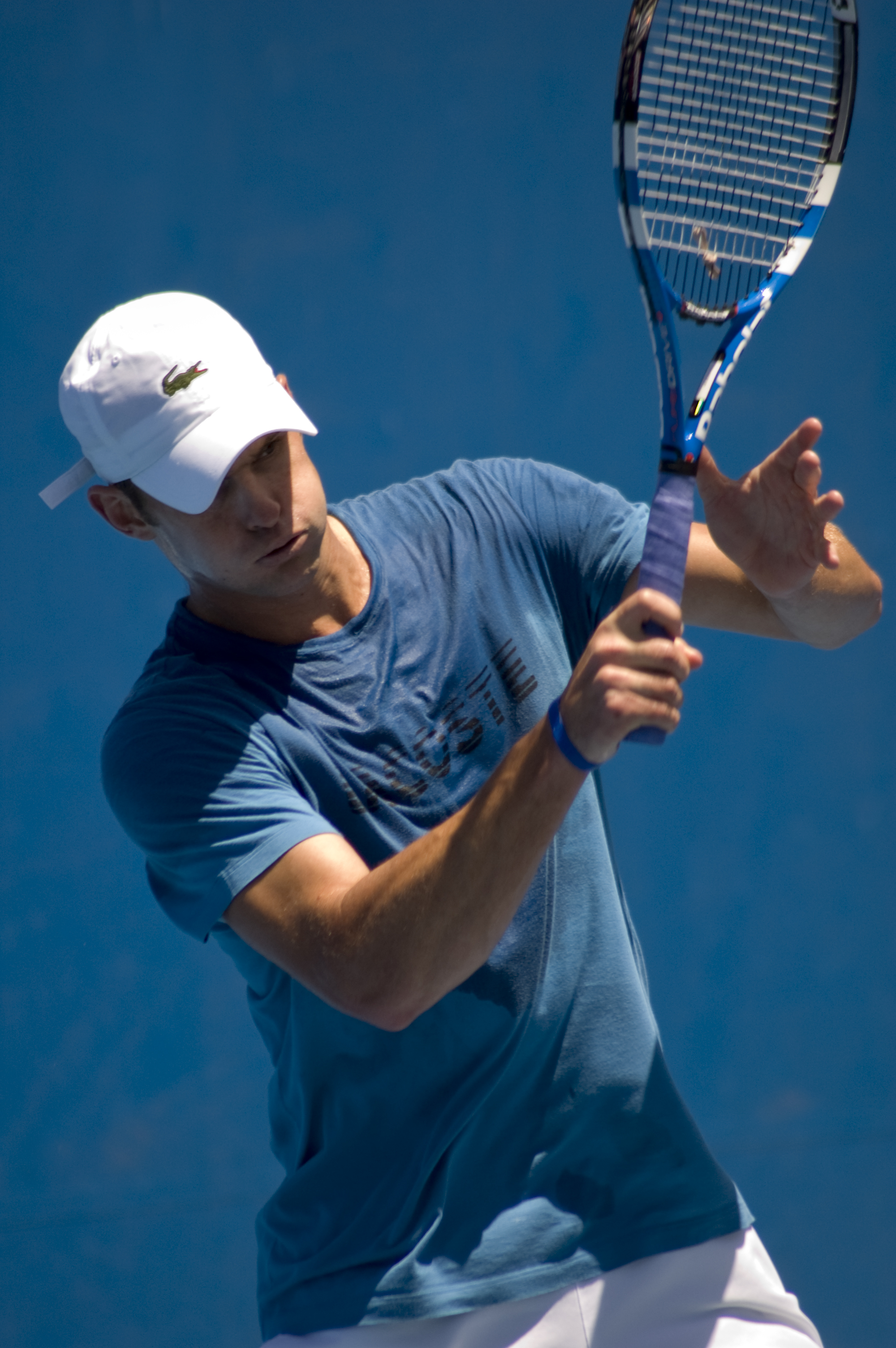
Roddick playing at the 2010 Australian Open

At the Brisbane Roddick beat Radek Štěpánek for his first ATP Tour title since February 2009, and making 2010 his tenth consecutive season with at least one ATP singles title. Roddick teamed with James Blake in the men's doubles and lost in the semis to Jérémy Chardy and Marc Gicquel. At the Australian Open he lost in the quarterfinals to Marin Čilić, despite coming back from two sets down while battling an apparent shoulder injury.

In SAP Open, he beat Sam Querrey in the semifinals before losing the final to Fernando Verdasco. At Regions Morgan Keegan Championships, he lost in the quarterfinals in a rematch of the San Jose semifinals to Sam Querrey. At Indian Wells Roddick beat Robin Söderling, before losing to Ivan Ljubičić in the final. This was Roddick's first Masters Series final since the 2006 Cincinnati Masters. In the Sony Ericsson Open, Roddick defeated Igor Andreev, Sergiy Stakhovsky, Benjamin Becker, Nicolás Almagro and Rafael Nadal to reach his fourth final of the year. In the final, Roddick won his second Sony Ericsson Open title, after defeating Tomáš Berdych in straight sets. This was Roddick's 29th title in 49 finals, fifth ATP Masters 1000 title, and first Masters 1000 title since 2006.

Roddick did not fare well during the clay-court season, withdrawing from Rome due for personal reasons and from Madrid due to a stomach virus. He then lost in the third round of the French Open to Teymuraz Gabashvili in straight sets. Roddick suffered his earliest ever exit in the 2010 Aegon Championships, a grass-court Wimbledon tune-up event. He was beaten by Dudi Sela in the third round. At Wimbledon, Roddick was seeded fifth, two spots higher than his ATP ranking of seven. He was defeated in the fourth round by No. 82 Lu Yen-hsun of Taiwan in five sets. Like his final match with Roger Federer the previous year, his serve was broken only once during the match, in the fifth set.

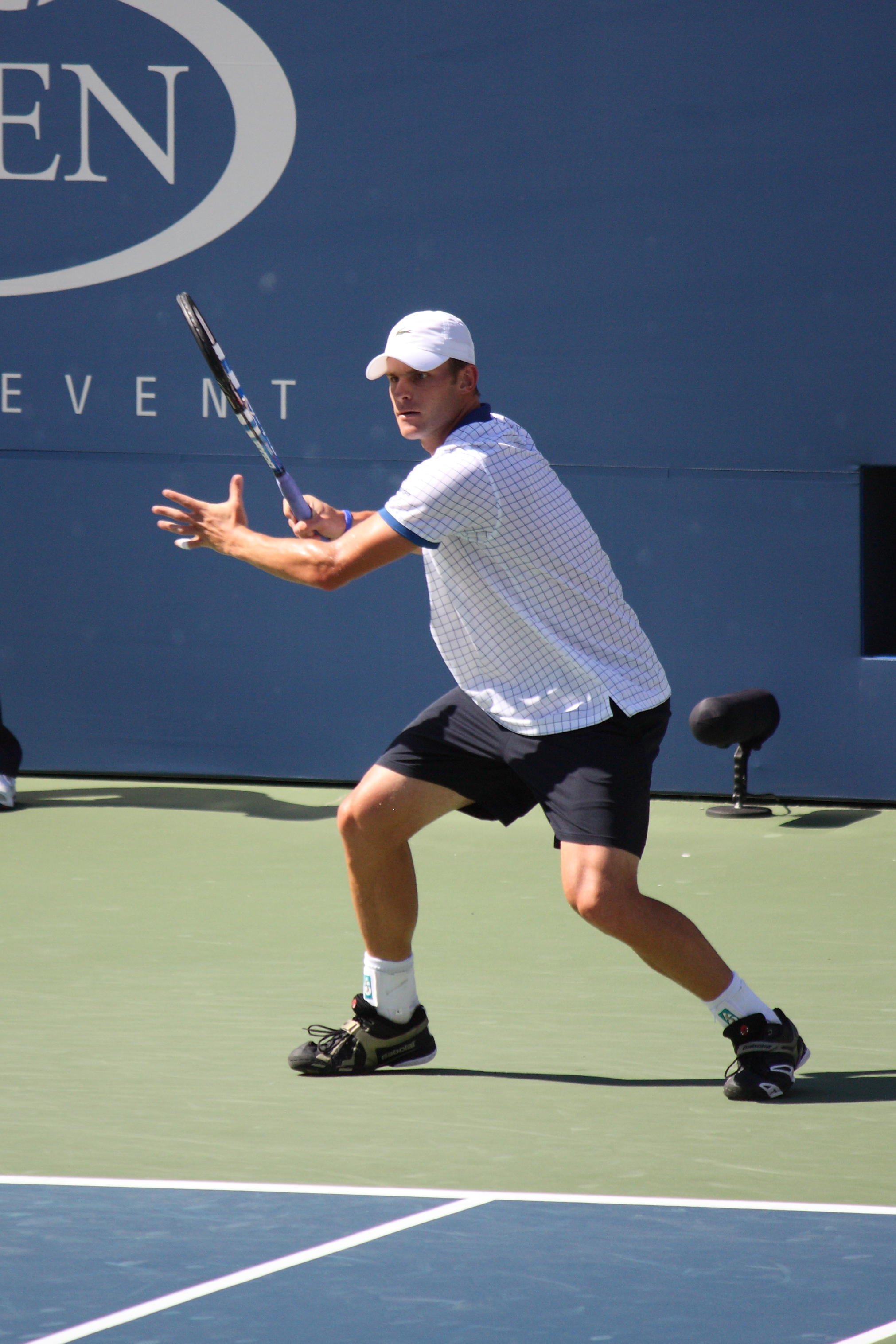
Andy Roddick playing at US Open 2010

At Atlanta, he was eliminated in the semifinals by eventual champion Mardy Fish. At Legg Mason Tennis Classic, he lost in the round of 16 to Gilles Simon. He dropped out of the top 10 and for the first time since the inception of the ATP world rankings, there was no American man in the top 10. On August 14, 2010, Roddick revealed that he had been diagnosed with mononucleosis, although he said his doctor believed it was in its later stages and he would make a complete recovery soon. At the Cincinnati Masters, he beat No. 5 Robin Söderling to reach the quarterfinals, where he defeated second seed Novak Djokovic. The win was Roddick's fourth consecutive over Djokovic, raising his career head-to-head record against Djokovic to 5–2 and ensuring Roddick's return to the top 10. In the semifinals, Roddick lost to Mardy Fish, failing to serve out the match at 5–3 in the second set. In the second round of the US Open, Roddick was beaten by Janko Tipsarević in four sets.

At the Japan Open, Roddick lost in the semifinals to Gaël Monfils. At Shanghai Masters, Roddick beat Philipp Kohlschreiber after Kohlschreiber retired in the second set and then Roddick himself retired in the second set against Guillermo García-López, after suffering a groin injury. At the Basel, he beat Sam Querrey, Andrey Golubev, and David Nalbandian, before losing to Roger Federer in straight sets.

At the BNP Paribas Masters, Roddick beat Jarkko Nieminen and Ernests Gulbis before losing to Robin Söderling in the quarterfinals. With Fernando Verdasco failing to reach the final, Roddick automatically qualified for the Barclays ATP World Tour Finals for the eighth consecutive year. Though he had dropped out of the top 10 in the ATP rankings after his early exit from the US Open, his victory over Gulbis in Paris assured his return to the top 10 at year end, making him and Federer the only players to maintain year-end top-10 ATP rankings from 2002 through 2010. Roddick played his final tournament of the year at the Barclays ATP World Tour Finals. Roddick lost all his round-robin matches to Rafael Nadal, Novak Djokovic, and Tomáš Berdych. Roddick ended the year No. 8, his ninth consecutive season finishing in the top 10.

=== 2011: Drop out of top 10 ===
At Brisbane, Roddick was defeated by Robin Söderling in the final. At the Australian Open, Roddick lost to Stanislas Wawrinka in round four in straight sets. He then won the 2011 Regions Morgan Keegan Championships, defeating Ričardas Berankis, Janko Tipsarević, Lleyton Hewitt, Juan Martín del Potro and Milos Raonic. Roddick began his Davis Cup campaign for the United States against Chile. He beat Nicolás Massú in four sets and beat Paul Capdeville in four sets to clinch the victory for the U.S. Roddick improved his record to 12–0 in Davis Cup clinchers.

At the BNP Paribas Open, he was beaten by Richard Gasquet in the fourth round. In the 2011 Sony Ericsson Open, as the defending champion, Roddick was upset by Pablo Cuevas in the second round. This loss dropped Roddick to No. 12 in the rankings and the second-ranked American behind compatriot Mardy Fish. Roddick then began his clay-court season at the Mutua Madrid Open, but he was upset in the first round by qualifier Flavio Cipolla in three sets. At Internazionali BNL d'Italia he lost in the first round for the second straight tournament to Gilles Simon. He teamed with Mardy Fish to play doubles in Rome, and they went to the final before Roddick had to withdraw because of a shoulder injury. Roddick also withdrew from the Nice Open in France and pulled out of the 2011 French Open, after failing to recover.

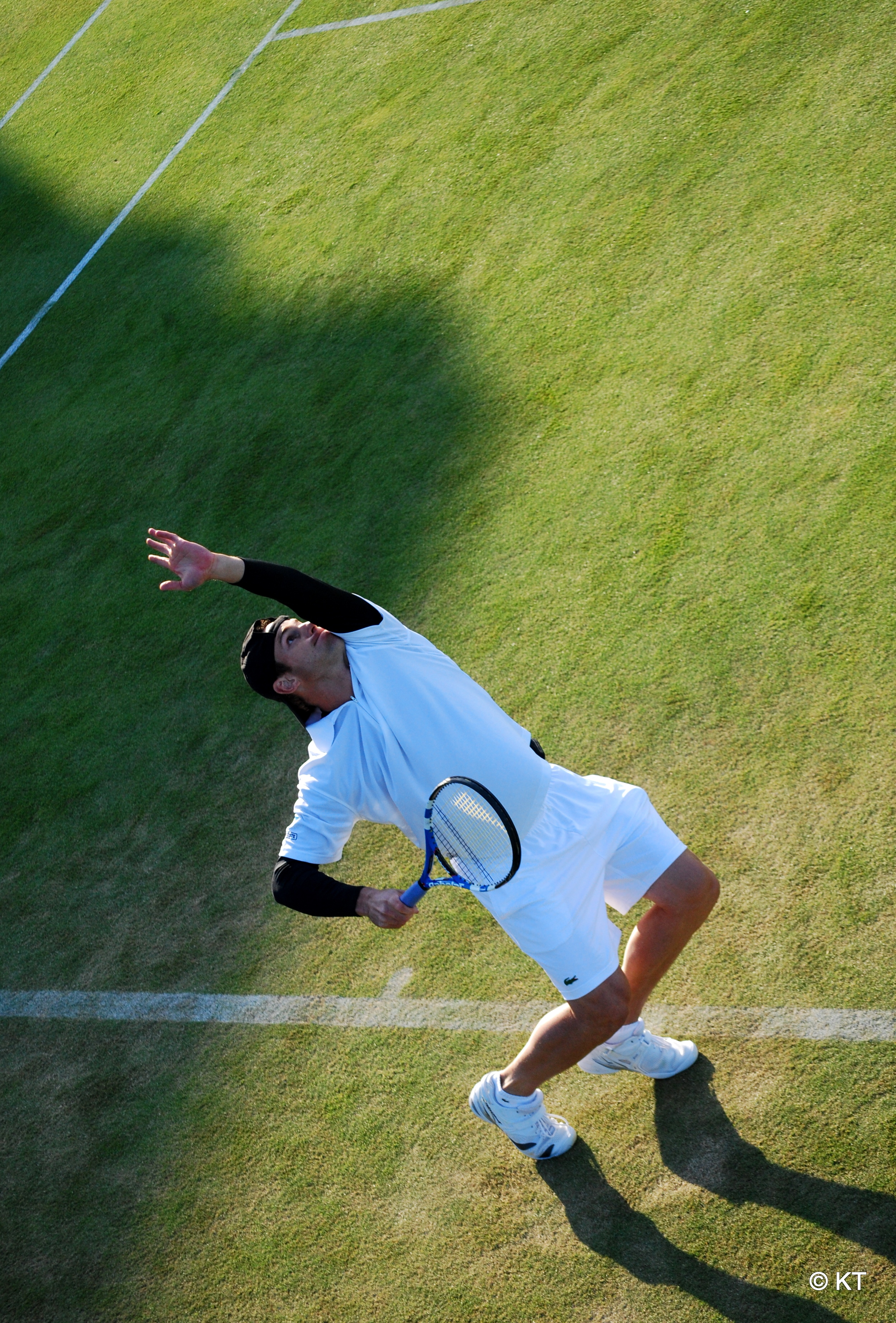
Andy Roddick at the Queen's Championships

At the Aegon Championships, Roddick lost to Andy Murray in the semi finals, their first meeting since the Wimbledon 2009 semifinals. Roddick was seeded eighth for Wimbledon, and lost in the third round in straight sets to Feliciano López. Roddick had failed to reach the quarterfinals of any Grand Slam since the 2010 Australian open. This was the longest Roddick had ever gone in his career without reaching the quarterfinals of a Grand Slam. In the Davis Cup quarterfinals match against Spain, Roddick drew David Ferrer first, but lost in three tight sets (Spain won the tie).

Roddick withdrew from the Legg Masson Tennis Classic, and Rogers Cup, after partially tearing his oblique muscle while practicing. At the Western & Southern Open, he lost in the first round to Philipp Kohlschreiber. This loss made him drop out of the top 20 for the first time since August 2001. After suffering an early exit at Cincinnati, Roddick played at the Winston-Salem Open in North Carolina, where he lost in the semifinals to John Isner. Roddick was seeded 21st at the U.S. Open. He beat Michael Russell, Jack Sock, Julien Benneteau and David Ferrer to advance to his first Grand Slam quarterfinal since the 2010 Australian Open, where he lost to No. 2 Rafael Nadal.

At the China Open, he lost to Kevin Anderson. At Shanghai Rolex Masters, he lost to David Ferrer in the quarterfinals. After this, he played at the Swiss Indoors Basel, where he lost to Roger Federer in the quarterfinals. At Paris, he had a third-round loss to Andy Murray. This loss ended Roddick's 2011 season, which left him out of the top 10, after being there for nine consecutive years.

=== 2012: Retirement ===
At the Australian Open, Roddick beat Robin Haase in straight sets, but he retired against Lleyton Hewitt while trailing, due to a hamstring injury. At San Jose he beat Denis Kudla in the round of 16, but lost in the quarterfinals to Denis Istomin. At Regions Morgan Keegan Championships in Memphis, his title defense was short-lived, as he lost his first-round match to Xavier Malisse. At Delray Beach International Tennis Championships, he defeated Philipp Petzschner and Istomin in the first and second rounds, respectively, before falling to Kevin Anderson.

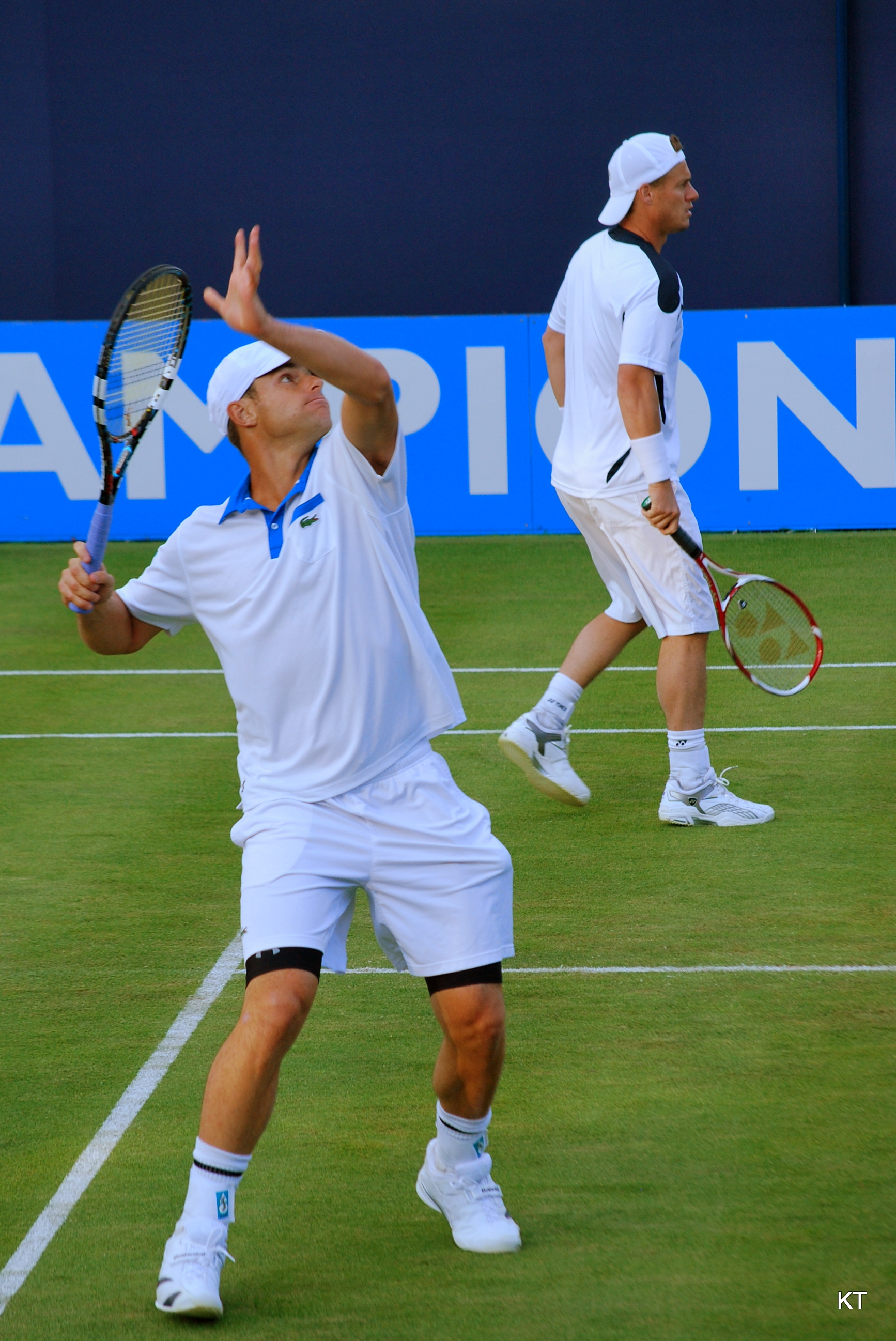
Andy Roddick at the Queen's Championships 2012 with Hewitt

In March, at Indian Wells, Roddick beat Łukasz Kubot in the second round, but then lost in the next round to Tomáš Berdych. Later in the month, at Sony Ericsson Open, Roddick faced No. 3 Federer, this being the first time they played each other before the quarterfinals of any tournament. Roddick defeated Federer for only the third time in his career to reach the fourth round, but then lost to Juan Mónaco. Roddick then elected not to play in the final three clay-court Masters events leading up to the French Open. At French Open, he fell to Nicolas Mahut in the first round in four sets. After this, Roddick played at Aegon Championships, where he lost in the second round to Édouard Roger-Vasselin, despite having a match point in the third set.

At the Aegon International, he received a wild card into the main draw as the sixth seed. He beat Sam Querrey, Jérémy Chardy, Fabio Fognini, Steve Darcis and defending champion Andreas Seppi in the final for his 31st career title and first of 2012. He thus became the only male tennis player besides Roger Federer to have won at least one title every year in the past 12 years. At Wimbledon he beat Jamie Baker and Björn Phau, but lost to David Ferrer in the third round in four sets.

At the BB&T Atlanta Open he beat Nicolas Mahut, Michael Russell in the quarterfinals, John Isner in the semifinals and Gilles Müller in the final. Roddick's London Olympics campaign began with a victory over Martin Kližan. In the second round, Roddick lost to No. 2 Novak Djokovic. After the Olympics, Roddick decided not to play in Toronto and went straight to Cincinnati, where he lost in the first round to Frenchman Jérémy Chardy.

In the US Open, Roddick began his campaign with a victory over his countryman Rhyne Williams. On August 30, 2012, which was his thirtieth birthday, Roddick announced that he would retire after the tournament. After announcing his retirement, Roddick defeated Bernard Tomic and Fabio Fognini before his final match on September 5, 2012, where he lost to Juan Martín del Potro in four sets in the fourth round. Four days after his loss, Roddick was honored in a special ceremony in Arthur Ashe Stadium on his retirement, in which Andre Agassi participated. Due to his retirement, he ended the year at No. 39, the lowest he had been since 2000, the year he turned professional, when he only played five events.

=== 2015 ===
Roddick played one tournament on tour, the 2015 BB&T Atlanta Open, where he competed in the men's doubles event with Mardy Fish. They lost in the quarterfinals.

=== 2017: Hall of Fame induction ===
Roddick was inducted into the International Tennis Hall of Fame on July 22, 2017, alongside Kim Clijsters of Belgium.

== Nicknames and on-court behavior ==
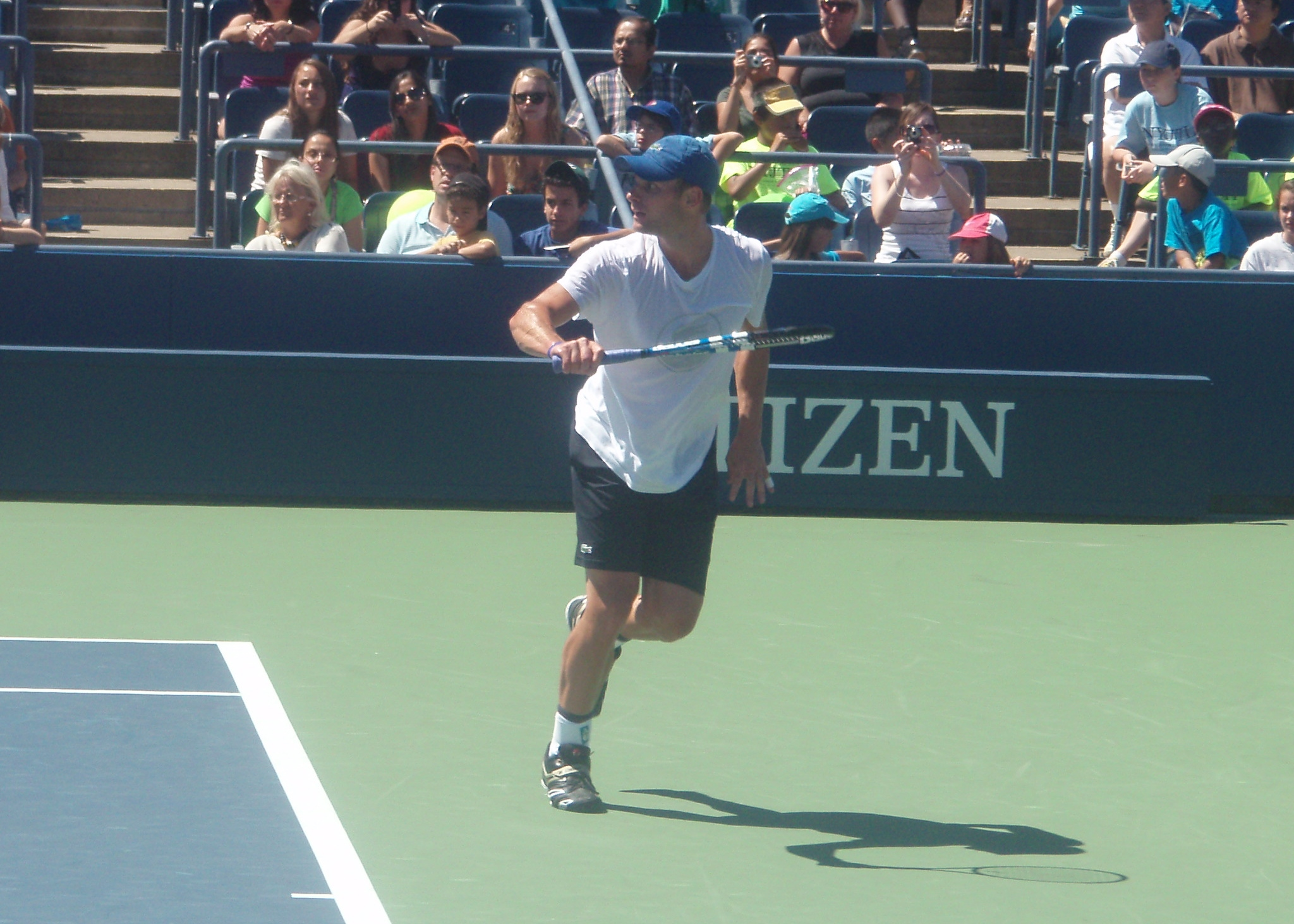
Roddick at 2011 US Open

Roddick is often called "A-Rod", a play on the nickname of New York Yankees baseball star Alex Rodriguez, referring to his first initial and the first syllable of his last name.

Roddick made frequent outbursts against umpires and linesmen on the court. At the 2001 US Open, Roddick angrily disputed a ball that landed wide at a crucial point in the fifth set of his quarter-final match against Lleyton Hewitt (he was serving at *4–5), calling umpire Jorge Dias "a moron" and copping a code violation for audible obscenity. During his third-round match at the Australian Open in 2008, he abused umpire Emmanuel Joseph saying, "You're an idiot! Stay in school, kids or you'll end up being an umpire."

Roddick lost his temper again at the 2010 Australian Open after a ball that he did not play was called out on match point, but ruled to be in after a video review. He continued arguing with the umpire after the conclusion of the match but later said that he was wrong. Later again that year, he launched into a tirade at an official over a foot-fault call at the 2010 US Open, a match he eventually lost to Serbia's Janko Tipsarević. In 2011, Roddick snapped at the chair umpire at Indian Wells on his way to lose to France's Richard Gasquet.

In a second-round match against Philipp Kohlschreiber at the 2011 Cincinnati Masters, Roddick was given a penalty point, which resulted in a critical break of serve in favor of his opponent. The penalty point was given due to ball-abuse, when Roddick smashed a ball into the stands in frustration after he had already been warned earlier in the match by umpire Carlos Bernardes for an episode of racquet abuse. This triggered another series of altercations with the umpire, with Roddick expressing his displeasure at the umpire's call. Roddick lost the match.

== Endorsements ==
From 2000 to 2005, Roddick wore Reebok apparel. After Reebok announced it would not renew its contract with Roddick, Roddick signed a five-year, $25 million endorsement deal with Lacoste in April 2005. In November, he signed an agreement to endorse Lacoste eyewear for four years worth between $750,000 and $1 million. In 2011, Lacoste introduced the Andy Roddick collection which included polos, jackets, tennis shorts and track pants. In June 2013, Roddick became an investor and brand ambassador to TravisMathew Apparel.

In 2005, Roddick signed a multiyear worldwide endorsement deal with carmaker Lexus. His other endorsement deals include American Express, Rolex, Powerade in 2002, Parlux Fragrances, Arizona Beverage Company in 2009, Microsoft Xbox and Sega.

== Playing style ==
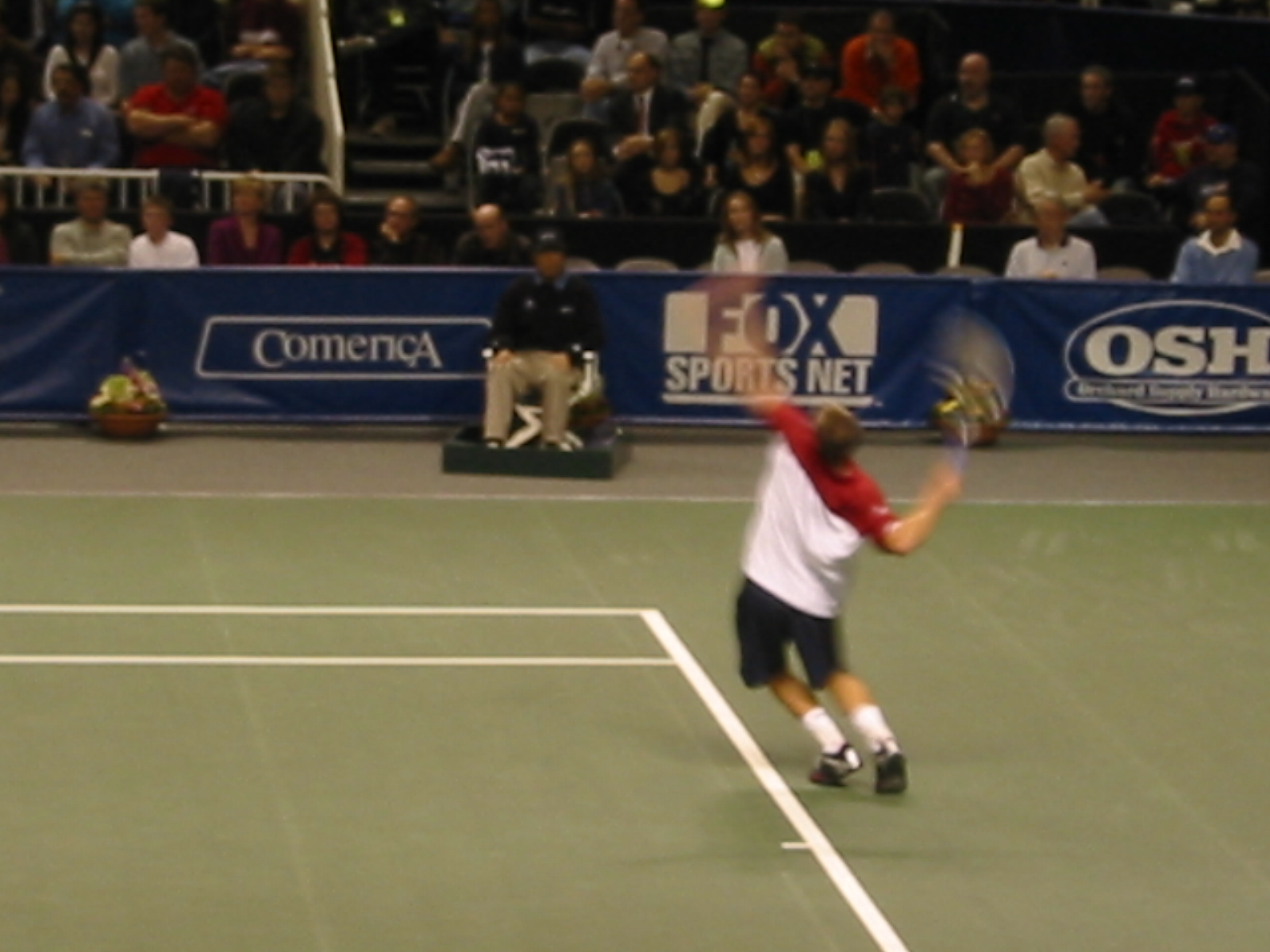
Roddick serving in 2004

Roddick's serve was known for its power, usually travelling at 130–150 miles per hour (210–240 km/h) and often unreturnable. He once held the record for fastest serve at 155 mph (249 km/h). Roddick's favorite shot is his off-forehand, which he used in combination with his kicker out wide. Roddick used to play his off-forehand frequently but later adjusted and used it to create points. He usually targeted the two corners to win aces. As for his second serve, he usually employed a heavy kick serve, then used a variety of spins, slices, and angles in the rally to throw off his opponent. He was noted for using heavy topspin on both his serves and his twist serve was particularly high kicking.

Roddick also occasionally used the serve-and-volley tactic on both first and second services to surprise his opponent, though he generally remained near the baseline after a serve. He later developed a more all-court playing style compared to the aggressive baseline style he played with for most of his early career. Although Roddick's backhand was a weakness throughout his career, it improved somewhat in 2009 under Stefanki's guidance.

== Media appearances ==
On April 5, 2002, Roddick guest-starred on the television show Sabrina the Teenage Witch as himself. In the episode, Sabrina summoned him so he could give her tennis lessons.

Roddick appeared on The Late Late Show with Craig Kilborn in 2002 and 2003, Late Show with David Letterman in 2003 and 2009, Late Night with Conan O'Brien, and Live with Regis and Kelly in 2003, Jimmy Kimmel Live! in 2004 and 2005, The Tonight Show with Jay Leno in 2005 and 2007, and The Ellen DeGeneres Show in 2006. Roddick also appeared on Friday Night with Jonathan Ross in 2007 and 2010.

Roddick hosted Saturday Night Live on November 8, 2003, becoming the second professional tennis player to host (Chris Evert being the first during the show's 15th season) and the first (and, as of September 2023, only) male tennis player to host.

Pre-Wimbledon, Roddick appeared on an episode of the British version of The Weakest Link, which was broadcast on June 18, 2004.

Roddick was in an advertisement for This is SportsCenter, with Stuart Scott, in which he confronts the Sports Center anchor about the anchors not calling him "A-Rod", and asks him "Did Alex Rodriguez put you up to this?" Scott replies "Who?" Roddick says "A-Rod!" Scott gets a sneaky look on his face, and Roddick leaves disgusted.

The June/July issue of Men's Fitness magazine carried an article on Roddick. The cover shot featured the tennis ace in a T-shirt, straining to contain massive, pumped-up biceps and hulking shoulder and chest muscles. The image set off widespread online speculation that the magazine had altered Roddick's likeness, a suspicion echoed by Roddick himself. Roddick has quipped that he saw the photo, and that "Nadal wanted his arms back."

In March 2009, Roddick appeared in the "Speed Feels Better" music video for singer-songwriter Michael Tolcher. Other athletes in the video included Amanda Beard, Barry Sanders, Kimmie Meissner, and Rick Ankiel.

Roddick played tennis using a frying pan instead of a racquet for the book Andy Roddick Beat Me With a Frying Pan by Todd Gallagher.

In 2011, Roddick made a cameo at the end of the film Just Go With It, as the new lover of the film's jilted bride, played by Decker.

In 2011 Roddick co-hosted a radio show for one day on Fox Sports Radio with his friend Bobby Bones on the latter's eponymous program. Due to the success of that one-time show, Fox Sports Radio offered Roddick and Bones a nationally syndicated sports radio show. The show debuted on January 7, 2012, and could be heard nationally on Saturdays from 12 to 3 PM CST. It was a mix of sports, pop culture and entertainment. On February 16, 2012, Roddick interviewed his wife, Brooklyn, on the radio show and during that interview he first revealed his plans on retiring and turning the radio show into a daily show and into his new career.

At the 2013 AT&T Pebble Beach Pro-Am, Roddick played his first professional golf tournament (as an amateur) where he teamed up with professional golfer, John Mallinger. Although Roddick's team missed the cut to get the final round, he and Mallinger ended with a combined score of 16 under par (with Roddick individually hitting at a 6 handicap).

In 2013, Roddick was hired by Fox Sports 1 as co-host for the network's flagship program Fox Sports Live.

In 2015, Roddick joined the BBC as pundit and commentator for the 2015 Wimbledon Championships.

In 2017, Roddick's wife revealed that he discarded most of his tennis trophies except the US Open trophy.

In 2019, Roddick appeared on Celebrity Family Feud with his wife and the rest of the Decker family, competing against Bobby Bones and his family.

During the COVID-19 pandemic, Roddick tweeted Tennis Channel requesting a "job." This led him to become a temporary contributor to the channel.

On April 2, 2023, Roddick participated with Michael Chang, Andre Agassi and John McEnroe in the first live airing of Pickleball on ESPN in the Million dollar Pickleball Slam at the Hard Rock Casino in Hollywood, Fla.

In 2024, Roddick began a weekly podcast series for Tennis Channel named "Served with Andy Roddick".

In 2024, Roddick recorded public service announcements for the US Open for MTA New York City Transit.

== Personal life ==
From 2003 to 2004, Roddick dated actress and singer Mandy Moore.

It was while Roddick was watching a show on the CNN/Sports Illustrated website called She Says Z Says that he first noticed Brooklyn Decker, to whom he is now married. According to Decker in an interview with David Letterman, Roddick had his agent contact her agent to arrange an initial meeting. The two began dating in 2007, and on March 31, 2008, Roddick announced on his website that they had become engaged. The couple were married on April 17, 2009, in Austin, Texas. Decker gave birth to the couple's first child on September 30, 2015. She gave birth to their second child, a daughter, on November 27, 2017.

== Awards and records ==
In 2004, Roddick produced what was then the fastest serve in professional tennis: 249.4 km/h (155.0 mph) during a Davis Cup semifinal match with Vladimir Voltchkov on hard court in Charleston, South Carolina. Roddick's record serve has since been superseded by Ivo Karlović, who served at 251 km/h (156 mph) playing at the Davis Cup in March 2011. Roddick also had the fastest serve in U.S. Open history: 244 km/h (152 mph) against American Scoville Jenkins, and against future No. 1 Rafael Nadal. Roddick also won the 2004 ESPY Award for Best Male Tennis Player.

That same year he won the Arthur Ashe Humanitarian Award of the Year because of his charity efforts, which included: raising money for the survivors of the tsunami following 2004 Indian Ocean earthquake through Serving for Tsunami Relief and other efforts; auctioning off several rackets and autographs to raise money for UNICEF; and creating the Andy Roddick Foundation to help at-risk youth.

In 2007, Roddick and the Andy Roddick Foundation were awarded by the Arthur Ashe Institute for Urban Health. Roddick was the first male tennis player ever to receive the award.

Serve records since 1991:

- Fastest serve in Australian Open: 148 mph.
- Fastest serve in Dubai: 150 mph.
- Fastest average in first serve: 134 mph.
- Fastest serve in Beijing: 148 mph.
- Fastest serve in San Jose: 150 mph.
- Fastest serve in Madrid: 151 mph.
- Fastest serve in Washington: 151 mph.
- Fastest serve in Queens: 153 mph.
- Fastest serve in Lyon: 142 mph.
- Fastest serve in US Open: 152 mph.
- Fastest serve at Roland Garros: 144 mph (2006–2010).
- Fastest serve at Queens: 151 mph.
- Fastest serve at Wimbledon: 143 mph (2011).
- Fastest serve on record (Davis Cup): 155 mph (2004–2011).

== Career statistics ==
=== Grand Slam tournaments ===
==== Performance timeline ====
Key
W	F	SF	QF	#R	RR	Q#	DNQ	A	NH

(W) winner; (F) finalist; (SF) semifinalist; (QF) quarterfinalist; (#R) rounds 4, 3, 2, 1; (RR) round-robin stage; (Q#) qualification round; (DNQ) did not qualify; (A) absent; (NH) not held; (SR) strike rate (events won / competed); (W–L) win–loss record.

Tournament	2000	2001	2002	2003	2004	2005	2006	2007	2008	2009	2010	2011	2012	SR	W–L
Australian Open	A	A	2R	SF	QF	SF	4R	SF	3R	SF	QF	4R	2R	0 / 11	38–11
French Open	A	3R	1R	1R	2R	2R	1R	1R	A	4R	3R	A	1R	0 / 10	9–10
Wimbledon	A	3R	3R	SF	F	F	3R	QF	2R	F	4R	3R	3R	0 / 12	41–12
US Open	1R	QF	QF	W	QF	1R	F	QF	QF	3R	2R	QF	4R	1 / 13	43–12
Win–loss	0–1	8–3	7–4	17–3	15–4	12–4	11–4	13–4	7–3	16–4	10–4	9–3	6–4	1 / 46	131–45

==== Finals: 5 (1 title, 4 runner-ups) ====
Result	Year	Championship	Surface	Opponent	Score
Win	2003	US Open	Hard	(Spain) Juan Carlos Ferrero	6–3, 7–6^{(7–2)}, 6–3
Loss	2004	Wimbledon	Grass	(Switzerland) Roger Federer	6–4, 5–7, 6–7^{(3–7)}, 4–6
Loss	2005	Wimbledon	Grass	(Switzerland) Roger Federer	2–6, 6–7^{(2–7)}, 4–6
Loss	2006	US Open	Hard	(Switzerland) Roger Federer	2–6, 6–4, 5–7, 1–6
Loss	2009	Wimbledon	Grass	(Switzerland) Roger Federer	7–5, 6–7^{(6–8)}, 6–7^{(5–7)}, 6–3, 14–16

=== Masters Series ===
==== Finals: 9 (5 titles, 4 runner-ups) ====
Result	Year	Tournament	Surface	Opponent	Score
Loss	2002	Toronto, Canada	Hard	(Argentina) Guillermo Cañas	4–6, 5–7
Win	2003	Montreal, Canada	Hard	(Argentina) David Nalbandian	6–1, 6–3
Win	2003	Cincinnati, US	Hard	(United States) Mardy Fish	4–6, 7–6^{(7–3)}, 7–6^{(7–4)}
Win	2004	Miami, US	Hard	(Argentina) Guillermo Coria	6–7^{(2–7)}, 6–3, 6–1, ret.
Loss	2004	Toronto, Canada	Hard	(Switzerland) Roger Federer	5–7, 3–6
Loss	2005	Cincinnati, US	Hard	(Switzerland) Roger Federer	3–6, 5–7
Win	2006	Cincinnati, US (2)	Hard	(Spain) Juan Carlos Ferrero	6–3, 6–4
Loss	2010	Indian Wells, US	Hard	(Croatia) Ivan Ljubičić	6–7^{(3–7)}, 6–7^{(5–7)}
Win	2010	Miami, US (2)	Hard	(Czech Republic) Tomáš Berdych	7–5, 6–4

=== Records ===
- These records were attained in the Open Era of tennis.

Championship	Years	Record accomplished	Player tied
Wimbledon	2009	39 games won in a Grand Slam final	Stands alone
ATP World Tour	2007	18 consecutive tiebreaks won	Stands alone
US Open	2004	Fastest serve in a Grand Slam tournament since 1991 (152 mph)	Stands alone

=== Filmography ===
In 2011, Roddick made a cameo appearance in the Adam Sandler comedy film Just Go with It with his real-life wife Brooklyn Decker.

Roddick plays a fictionalized version of himself in the Apple TV Comedy The Dink.

== See also ==
- World TeamTennis, played for the Philadelphia Freedoms in 2010.
- Federer–Roddick rivalry

Sporting positions
Preceded by Juan Carlos Ferrero	World No. 1 November 3, 2003 - February 1, 2004	Succeeded by Roger Federer
Preceded by Lleyton Hewitt	US Open Series Champion; 2005, 2006	Succeeded by Roger Federer
Awards and achievements
Preceded by Olivier Rochus	ATP Newcomer of the Year; 2001	Succeeded by Paul-Henri Mathieu
Preceded by Lleyton Hewitt	ATP Player of the Year; 2003	Succeeded by Roger Federer
Preceded by Lleyton Hewitt	ITF World Champion; 2003	Succeeded by Roger Federer
Preceded by Andre Agassi	ESPY Best Male Tennis Player; 2004	Succeeded by Roger Federer
Records
Preceded by Greg Rusedski	Fastest serve world record holder June 11, 2004 – March 6, 2011	Succeeded by Ivo Karlović
