= 2017 BB&T Atlanta Open – Doubles =

Doubles
- 2017 BB&T Atlanta Open

Final
- Champions: (United States) Bob Bryan (United States) Mike Bryan
- Runners-up: (Netherlands) Wesley Koolhof (New Zealand) Artem Sitak
- Score: 6–3, 6–4

Events
Singles	Doubles
← 2016 ·	BB&T Atlanta Open	· 2018 →

Andrés Molteni and Horacio Zeballos were the defending champions, but Zeballos chose to compete in Hamburg instead. Molteni played alongside Adil Shamasdin, but lost in the quarterfinals to Wesley Koolhof and Artem Sitak.

Bob Bryan and Mike Bryan won the title, defeating Koolhof and Sitak in the final, 6–3, 6–4.

== Seeds ==
1. (United States) Bob Bryan / (United States) Mike Bryan (champions)
2. (United States) Ryan Harrison / (New Zealand) Michael Venus (first round)
3. (United States) Nicholas Monroe / (United States) Donald Young (first round)
4. (India) Purav Raja / (India) Divij Sharan (semifinals)

== Draw ==
=== Key ===
- Q = Qualifier
- WC = Wild card
- LL = Lucky loser
- Alt = Alternate
- SE = Special exempt
- PR = Protected ranking
- ITF = ITF entry
- JE = Junior exempt
- w/o = Walkover
- r = Retired
- d = Defaulted
- SR = Special ranking

=== Draw ===
First round
1	(United States) B Bryan (United States) M Bryan	4	6	[10]
(Australia) M Reid (Australia) J-P Smith	6	4	[7]
(South Korea) H Chung (India) J Nedunchezhiyan	6	6
WC	(United States) E Sock (United States) J Sock	3	4
3	(United States) N Monroe (United States) D Young	6	6^{9}	[5]
(Pakistan) A-u-H Qureshi (Thailand) So Ratiwatana	1	7^{11}	[10]
PR	(Australia) J Millman (Thailand) Sa Ratiwatana	6	6
(Cyprus) M Baghdatis (Tunisia) M Jaziri	2	2
(Luxembourg) G Müller (France) H Nys	5	0
(Mexico) S González (United States) S Lipsky	7	6
(Philippines) T Huey (Sweden) R Lindstedt	6^{2}	7^{7}	[4]
4	(India) P Raja (India) D Sharan	7^{7}	6^{2}	[10]
(Netherlands) W Koolhof (New Zealand) A Sitak	6	3	[10]
WC	(United States) J Cox (United States) E Reinberg	2	6	[6]
(Argentina) A Molteni (Canada) A Shamasdin	6	0	[10]
2	(United States) R Harrison (New Zealand) M Venus	4	6	[7]

Quarterfinals
1	(United States) B Bryan (United States) M Bryan	6	6
(South Korea) H Chung (India) J Nedunchezhiyan	1	2
(Pakistan) A-u-H Qureshi (Thailand) So Ratiwatana	2	4
PR	(Australia) J Millman (Thailand) Sa Ratiwatana	6	6
(Mexico) S González (United States) S Lipsky	7^{8}	6^{5}	[3]
4	(India) P Raja (India) D Sharan	6^{6}	7^{7}	[10]
(Netherlands) W Koolhof (New Zealand) A Sitak	6^{7}	7^{7}	[10]
(Argentina) A Molteni (Canada) A Shamasdin	7^{9}	6^{4}	[7]

Semifinals
1	(United States) B Bryan (United States) M Bryan	6	6
PR	(Australia) J Millman (Thailand) Sa Ratiwatana	2	3
4	(India) P Raja (India) D Sharan	6^{3}	4
(Netherlands) W Koolhof (New Zealand) A Sitak	7^{7}	6

Final
1	(United States) B Bryan (United States) M Bryan	6	6
(Netherlands) W Koolhof (New Zealand) A Sitak	3	4
