= 2017 BB&T Atlanta Open =

- Date: July 24–30
- Edition: 30th
- Category: ATP World Tour 250
- Draw: 28S / 16D
- Prize money: $642,750
- Surface: Hard / outdoor
- Location: Atlanta, United States
- Venue: Atlantic Station

Champions

Singles
- (United States) John Isner

Doubles
- (United States) Bob Bryan / (United States) Mike Bryan
← 2016 ·	Atlanta Open	· 2018 →

The 2017 BB&T Atlanta Open was a professional men's tennis tournament played on hard courts. It was the 30th edition of the tournament, and part of the 2017 ATP World Tour and the 2017 US Open Series. It took place at Atlantic Station in Atlanta, United States between July 24 and 30, 2017. It was the first men's event of the 2017 US Open Series.

== Singles main-draw entrants ==
=== Seeds ===
Country	Player	Rank^{1}	Seed
USA	Jack Sock	17	1
USA	John Isner	21	2
LUX	Gilles Müller	22	3
USA	Ryan Harrison	40	4
GBR	Kyle Edmund	47	5
USA	Donald Young	50	6
KOR	Chung Hyeon	54	7
USA	Jared Donaldson	58	8

- ^{1} Rankings are as of July 17, 2017

=== Other entrants ===
The following players received wildcards into the singles main draw:

- (United States) Christopher Eubanks
- (United States) Taylor Fritz
- (United States) Reilly Opelka

The following player received entry using a protected ranking:

- (Australia) John Millman

The following players received entry as special exempts:

- (United States) Bjorn Fratangelo
- (Germany) Peter Gojowczyk

The following players received entry from the qualifying draw:

- (France) Quentin Halys
- (United States) Stefan Kozlov
- (United States) Tommy Paul
- (United States) Tim Smyczek

=== Withdrawals ===
Before the tournament

- (South Africa) Kevin Anderson →replaced by (Russia) Konstantin Kravchuk
- (United Kingdom) Dan Evans →replaced by (Slovakia) Lukáš Lacko
- (Australia) Nick Kyrgios →replaced by (Argentina) Guido Pella
- (France) Adrian Mannarino →replaced by (Italy) Thomas Fabbiano
- (Australia) Bernard Tomic →replaced by (Israel) Dudi Sela
- (Germany) Mischa Zverev →replaced by (Canada) Vasek Pospisil

== ATP doubles main-draw entrants ==
=== Seeds ===
Country	Player	Country	Player	Rank^{1}	Seed
USA	Bob Bryan	USA	Mike Bryan	16	1
USA	Ryan Harrison	NZL	Michael Venus	33	2
USA	Nicholas Monroe	USA	Donald Young	84	3
IND	Purav Raja	IND	Divij Sharan	103	4

- ^{1} Rankings are as of July 17, 2017

=== Other entrants ===
The following pairs received wildcards into the doubles main draw:

- (United States) Jordan Cox / (United States) Emil Reinberg
- (United States) Eric Sock / (United States) Jack Sock

== Finals ==
=== Singles ===
- (United States) John Isner defeated (United States) Ryan Harrison, 7–6^{(8–6)}, 7–6^{(9–7)}

=== Doubles ===
- (United States) Bob Bryan / (United States) Mike Bryan defeated (Netherlands) Wesley Koolhof / (New Zealand) Artem Sitak, 6–3, 6–4
