= 2019 BB&T Atlanta Open – Singles =

Singles
- 2019 BB&T Atlanta Open

Final
- Champion: (Australia) Alex de Minaur
- Runner-up: (United States) Taylor Fritz
- Score: 6–3, 7–6^{(7–2)}

Events
Singles	Doubles
← 2018 ·	BB&T Atlanta Open	· 2021 →

John Isner was the two-time defending champion and had won the title five times in the last six years, but he lost in the second round to Reilly Opelka. This was only the second time out of ten in the Atlanta Open's history that Isner failed to reach the singles final.

Alex de Minaur won the title, defeating Taylor Fritz in the final, 6–3, 7–6^{(7–2)}.

== Seeds ==
The top four seeds received a bye into the second round.

1. (United States) John Isner (second round)
2. (United States) Taylor Fritz (final)
3. (Australia) Alex de Minaur (champion)
4. (France) Pierre-Hugues Herbert (second round)
5. (United States) Frances Tiafoe (first round)
6. (Moldova) Radu Albot (second round)
7. (Australia) Jordan Thompson (first round)
8. (France) Ugo Humbert (second round)

== Draw ==
=== Key ===
- Q = Qualifier
- WC = Wild card
- LL = Lucky loser
- Alt = Alternate
- SE = Special exempt
- PR = Protected ranking
- ITF = ITF entry
- JE = Junior exempt
- w/o = Walkover
- r = Retired
- d = Defaulted
- SR = Special ranking

=== Finals ===
Semifinals
(United States) Reilly Opelka	6^{4}	7^{7}	3
3	(Australia) Alex de Minaur	7^{7}	6^{5}	6
(United Kingdom) Cameron Norrie	1	6	3
2	(United States) Taylor Fritz	6	3	6

Final
3	(Australia) Alex de Minaur	6	7^{7}
2	(United States) Taylor Fritz	3	6^{2}

=== Top half ===
First round
(United States) R Opelka	6	7^{7}
(Kazakhstan) A Bublik	3	6^{1}
(United Kingdom) D Evans	6	6
Q	(Chinese Taipei) J Jung	1	1
(United States) T Sandgren	4	6^{4}
6	(Moldova) R Albot	6	7^{7}
(United States) B Klahn	7^{7}	7
(Romania) M Copil	6^{3}	5
(Australia) M Ebden	7^{7}	6
Q	(Poland) K Majchrzak	6^{5}	3
(Australia) B Tomic	4	6	7^{7}
5	(United States) F Tiafoe	6	3	6^{4}

Second round
1	(United States) J Isner	6^{2}	7^{7}	6^{5}
(United States) R Opelka	7^{7}	6^{5}	7^{7}
(United Kingdom) D Evans	7^{7}	5	6
6	(Moldova) R Albot	6^{5}	7	2
3	(Australia) A de Minaur	6	6
(United States) B Klahn	4	4
(Australia) M Ebden	4	6^{3}
(Australia) B Tomic	6	7^{7}

Quarterfinals
(United States) R Opelka	7^{7}	7
(United Kingdom) D Evans	6^{3}	5
3	(Australia) A de Minaur	6	3
(Australia) B Tomic	2	0^{r}

Semifinals
(United States) R Opelka	6^{4}	7^{7}	3
3	(Australia) A de Minaur	7^{7}	6^{5}	6

=== Bottom half ===
First round
7	(Australia) J Thompson	6^{3}	6	3
(United Kingdom) C Norrie	7^{7}	4	6
Q	(South Korea) S-w Kwon	6^{4}	7	6
(India) P Gunneswaran	7^{7}	5	0
(Australia) A Popyrin	6	6
(United States) D Kudla	3	4
8	(France) U Humbert	7^{7}	6
WC	(United States) C Gromley	6^{2}	2
(Serbia) M Kecmanović	7^{11}	7^{7}
WC	(United States) J Sock	6^{9}	6^{5}
WC	(Bulgaria) G Dimitrov	5	4
Q	(United States) K King	7	6

Second round
(United Kingdom) C Norrie	6	6
Q	(South Korea) S-w Kwon	3	4
(Australia) A Popyrin	7	6
4	(France) P-H Herbert	5	3
8	(France) U Humbert	2	2
(Serbia) M Kecmanović	6	6
Q	(United States) K King	2	3
2	(United States) T Fritz	6	6

Quarterfinals
(United Kingdom) C Norrie	7	6
(Australia) A Popyrin	5	4
(Serbia) M Kecmanović	1	6^{1}
2	(United States) T Fritz	6	7^{7}

Semifinals
(United Kingdom) C Norrie	1	6	3
2	(United States) T Fritz	6	3	6

== Qualifying ==
=== Seeds ===
1. (Poland) Kamil Majchrzak (qualified)
2. (Argentina) Guido Andreozzi (first round)
3. (South Korea) Kwon Soon-woo (qualified)
4. (Germany) Dominik Köpfer (first round)
5. (Germany) Peter Gojowczyk (qualifying competition)
6. (Chinese Taipei) Jason Jung (qualified)
7. (United States) Tommy Paul (qualifying competition)
8. (United States) Ryan Harrison (qualifying competition, retired)

=== Qualifiers ===
1. (Poland) Kamil Majchrzak
2. (United States) Kevin King
3. (South Korea) Kwon Soon-woo
4. (Chinese Taipei) Jason Jung

=== Qualifying draw ===
==== First qualifier ====
First round
1	(Poland) Kamil Majchrzak	6	6
WC	(United States) Trent Bryde	4	2
(United States) Michael Mmoh	7	6^{3}	6^{3}
7	(United States) Tommy Paul	5	7^{7}	7^{7}

Qualifying competition
1	(Poland) Kamil Majchrzak	7^{7}	6
7	(United States) Tommy Paul	6^{5}	4

==== Second qualifier ====
First round
2	(Argentina) Guido Andreozzi	5	6	6^{2}
WC	(United States) Kevin King	7	4	7^{7}
Alt	(Serbia) Viktor Troicki	6	5	6^{5}
8	(United States) Ryan Harrison	4	7	7^{7}

Qualifying competition
WC	(United States) Kevin King	6^{6}	7	3
8	(United States) Ryan Harrison	7^{8}	5	1^{r}

==== Third qualifier ====
First round
3	(South Korea) Kwon Soon-woo	6	6
(Belarus) Ilya Ivashka	2	3
Alt	(Denmark) Mikael Torpegaard	4	6	6^{2}
5	(Germany) Peter Gojowczyk	6	3	7^{7}

Qualifying competition
3	(South Korea) Kwon Soon-woo	6	6
5	(Germany) Peter Gojowczyk	2	2

==== Fourth qualifier ====
First round
4	(Germany) Dominik Köpfer	6	4	3
Alt	(United States) Donald Young	3	6	6
(Australia) Alex Bolt	6^{6}	3
6	(Chinese Taipei) Jason Jung	7^{8}	6

Qualifying competition
Alt	(United States) Donald Young	1	6^{4}
6	(Chinese Taipei) Jason Jung	6	7^{7}
