= 2019 BB&T Atlanta Open =

- Date: July 22–29
- Edition: 32nd
- Category: ATP Tour 250
- Draw: 28S / 16D
- Prize money: $694,995
- Surface: Hard / outdoor
- Location: Atlanta, United States

Champions

Singles
- (Australia) Alex de Minaur

Doubles
- (United Kingdom) Dominic Inglot / (United States) Austin Krajicek
← 2018 ·	Atlanta Open	· 2021 →

The 2019 BB&T Atlanta Open was a professional men's tennis tournament to be played on hard courts. It was the 32nd edition of the tournament, and part of the 2019 ATP Tour. It took place at Atlantic Station in Atlanta, United States between July 22 and 29, 2019. It was the first men's event of the 2019 US Open Series. Third-seeded Alex de Minaur won the singles title.

== Finals ==
=== Singles ===
- (Australia) Alex de Minaur defeated (United States) Taylor Fritz, 6–3, 7–6^{(7–2)}

=== Doubles ===
- (United Kingdom) Dominic Inglot / (United States) Austin Krajicek defeated (United States) Bob Bryan / (United States) Mike Bryan, 6–4, 6–7^{(5–7)}, [11–9]

== ATP singles main-draw entrants ==
=== Seeds ===
Country	Player	Rank^{1}	Seed
USA	John Isner	15	1
USA	Taylor Fritz	30	2
AUS	Alex de Minaur	33	3
FRA	Pierre-Hugues Herbert	38	4
USA	Frances Tiafoe	41	5
MDA	Radu Albot	42	6
AUS	Jordan Thompson	43	7
FRA	Ugo Humbert	48	8

- ^{1} Rankings are as of July 15, 2019

=== Other entrants ===
The following players received wildcards into the singles main draw:

- (Bulgaria) Grigor Dimitrov
- (United States) Cole Gromley
- (United States) Jack Sock

The following players received entry from the qualifying draw:

- (Chinese Taipei) Jason Jung
- (United States) Kevin King
- (South Korea) Kwon Soon-woo
- (Poland) Kamil Majchrzak

=== Withdrawals ===
Before the tournament

- (Canada) Félix Auger-Aliassime → replaced by (Kazakhstan) Alexander Bublik
- (Poland) Hubert Hurkacz → replaced by (India) Prajnesh Gunneswaran
- (Australia) John Millman → replaced by (United States) Bradley Klahn
- (Argentina) Diego Schwartzman → replaced by (Australia) Bernard Tomic

== ATP doubles main-draw entrants ==
=== Seeds ===
Country	Player	Country	Player	Rank^{1}	Seed
USA	Bob Bryan	USA	Mike Bryan	35	1
GBR	Dominic Inglot	USA	Austin Krajicek	81	2
MEX	Santiago González	PAK	Aisam-ul-Haq Qureshi	106	3
MDA	Radu Albot	NZL	Artem Sitak	111	4

- Rankings are as of July 15, 2019

=== Other entrants ===
The following pairs received wildcards into the doubles main draw:

- (United States) Christopher Eubanks / (United States) Donald Young
- (Australia) Nick Kyrgios / (United States) Tommy Paul
