= 2017 US Open Series =

In tennis, the 2017 US Open Series was the fourteenth edition of the US Open Series, which comprised a group of hard court tournaments that started on July 24, 2017 in Atlanta and concluded in Connecticut for the women and in Winston-Salem for the men on August 26, 2017. This edition consisted of three separate men's tournaments and three women's tournaments, with the Western & Southern Open hosting both a men's and women's event. The series was headlined by two ATP World Tour Masters 1000 and two WTA Premier 5 events.

== Discontinuation of the Bonus Challenge ==
The 2017 US Open Series is the first edition of the series not to feature the Bonus Challenge. In previous years, players had been eligible for additional prize money, based on a combination of their finish in the series and their finish in the US Open itself, with the maximum amount of money being awarded to a player who won both.

== Tournament schedule ==
Legend
Grand Slam Event
ATP Masters 1000 and WTA Premier 5
ATP World Tour 500 and WTA Premier
ATP World Tour 250 and WTA International

Week	Date	Men's Events	Women's Events
1	July 24 – July 30	Atlanta; BB&T Atlanta Open; 2017 Champion: (United States) John Isner	No Series Event Held This Week
2	July 31 – August 6	No Series Event Held This Week	Stanford; Bank of the West Classic; 2017 Champion: (United States) Madison Keys
3	August 7 – August 13	Montreal; Rogers Cup presented by National Bank; 2017 Champion: (Germany) Alexander Zverev	Toronto; Rogers Cup presented by National Bank; 2017 Champion: (Ukraine) Elina Svitolina
4	August 14 – August 20	Cincinnati; Western & Southern Open; 2017 Champion: (Bulgaria) Grigor Dimitrov	Cincinnati; Western & Southern Open; 2017 Champion: (Spain) Garbiñe Muguruza
5	August 21 – August 27	Winston-Salem; Winston-Salem Open; 2017 Champion: (Spain) Roberto Bautista Agut	New Haven; Connecticut Open; 2017 Champion: (Australia) Daria Gavrilova
6–7	August 28 – September 10	New York; US Open; 2017 Champion: (Spain) Rafael Nadal	New York; US Open; 2017 Champion: (United States) Sloane Stephens

== Week 1 ==
=== ATP – BB&T Atlanta Open ===
Nick Kyrgios was the defending champion, but chose not to participate this year.

==== Main Draw Finals ====
Quarterfinals
1	(United States) Jack Sock	4	1
5	(United Kingdom) Kyle Edmund	6	6
4	(United States) Ryan Harrison	6	6
WC	(United States) Christopher Eubanks	1	2
Q	(United States) Tommy Paul	3	1
3	(Luxembourg) Gilles Müller	6	6
(Slovakia) Lukáš Lacko	5	4
2	(United States) John Isner	7	6

Semifinals
5	(United Kingdom) Kyle Edmund	7^{7}	3	4
4	(United States) Ryan Harrison	6^{5}	6	6
3	(Luxembourg) Gilles Müller	4	2
2	(United States) John Isner	6	6

Finals
4	(United States) Ryan Harrison	6^{6}	6^{7}
2	(United States) John Isner	7^{8}	7^{9}

== Week 2 ==
=== WTA – Bank of the West Classic (Stanford) ===
Johanna Konta was the defending champion, but chose not to participate this year.

==== Main Draw Finals ====
Quarterfinals
1	(Spain) Garbiñe Muguruza	6	6
5	(Croatia) Ana Konjuh	1	3
3	(United States) Madison Keys	6	6
7	(Ukraine) Lesia Tsurenko	4	3
6	(United States) Coco Vandeweghe	6	6
4	(Russia) Anastasia Pavlyuchenkova	2	3
8	(United States) Catherine Bellis	6	6
2/WC	(Czech Republic) Petra Kvitová	2	0

Semifinals
1	(Spain) Garbiñe Muguruza	3	2
3	(United States) Madison Keys	6	6
6	(United States) Coco Vandeweghe	6	6
8	(United States) Catherine Bellis	3	1

Final
3	(United States) Madison Keys	7^{7}	6
6	(United States) Coco Vandeweghe	6^{4}	4

== Week 3 ==
=== ATP – Rogers Cup (Montreal) ===
Novak Djokovic was the defending champion but withdrew with an elbow injury before the tournament began. He also announced that he would miss the remainder of the 2017 season, and thereby the entire US Open Series, due to the injury.

==== Main Draw Finals ====
Quarterfinals
WC	(Canada) Denis Shapovalov	2	6	6
(France) Adrian Mannarino	6	3	4
4	(Germany) Alexander Zverev	7	6
(South Africa) Kevin Anderson	5	4
(Netherlands) Robin Haase	4	6	6
(Argentina) Diego Schwartzman	6	3	3
12	(Spain) Roberto Bautista Agut	4	4
2	(Switzerland) Roger Federer	6	6

Semifinals
WC	(Canada) Denis Shapovalov	4	5
4	(Germany) Alexander Zverev	6	7
(Netherlands) Robin Haase	3	6^{5}
2	(Switzerland) Roger Federer	6	7^{7}

Final
4	(Germany) Alexander Zverev	6	6
2	(Switzerland) Roger Federer	3	4

=== WTA – Rogers Cup (Toronto) ===
Simona Halep was the defending champion, but lost to Elina Svitolina in the semifinals.

==== Main Draw Finals ====
Quarterfinals
1	(Czech Republic) Karolína Plíšková	5	7^{7}	4
6	(Denmark) Caroline Wozniacki	7	6^{3}	6
PR	(United States) Sloane Stephens	6	1	7
(Czech Republic) Lucie Šafářová	2	6	5
5	(Ukraine) Elina Svitolina	4	6	6
4	(Spain) Garbiñe Muguruza	6	4	3
(France) Caroline Garcia	4	2
2	(Romania) Simona Halep	6	6

Semifinals
6	(Denmark) Caroline Wozniacki	6	6
PR	(United States) Sloane Stephens	2	3
5	(Ukraine) Elina Svitolina	6	6
2	(Romania) Simona Halep	1	1

Final
6	(Denmark) Caroline Wozniacki	4	0
5	(Ukraine) Elina Svitolina	6	6

== Week 4 ==
=== ATP – Western & Southern Open (Cincinnati) ===
Marin Čilić was the defending champion, but withdrew before the tournament began.

==== Main Draw Finals ====
Quarterfinals
1	(Spain) Rafael Nadal	2	5
(Australia) Nick Kyrgios	6	7
3	(Austria) Dominic Thiem	3	3
(Spain) David Ferrer	6	6
WC	(United States) Jared Donaldson	6^{4}	5
14	(United States) John Isner	7^{7}	7
7	(Bulgaria) Grigor Dimitrov	6	6
(Japan) Yūichi Sugita	2	1

Semifinals
(Australia) Nick Kyrgios	7^{7}	7^{7}
(Spain) David Ferrer	6^{3}	6^{4}
14	(United States) John Isner	6^{4}	6^{10}
7	(Bulgaria) Grigor Dimitrov	7^{7}	7^{12}

Final
(Australia) Nick Kyrgios	3	5
7	(Bulgaria) Grigor Dimitrov	6	7

=== WTA – Western & Southern Open (Cincinnati) ===
Karolína Plíšková was the defending champion, but lost in the semifinals to Garbiñe Muguruza.

==== Main Draw Finals ====
Quarterfinals
1	(Czech Republic) Karolína Plíšková	6	6
6	(Denmark) Caroline Wozniacki	2	4
4	(Spain) Garbiñe Muguruza	6	5	7
8	(Russia) Svetlana Kuznetsova	2	7	5
(Germany) Julia Görges	1	6^{3}
WC	(United States) Sloane Stephens	6	7^{7}
7	(United Kingdom) Johanna Konta	4	6^{1}
2	(Romania) Simona Halep	6	7^{7}

Semifinals
1	(Czech Republic) Karolína Plíšková	3	2
4	(Spain) Garbiñe Muguruza	6	6
WC	(United States) Sloane Stephens	2	1
2	(Romania) Simona Halep	6	6

Final
4	(Spain) Garbiñe Muguruza	6	6
2	(Romania) Simona Halep	1	0

== Week 5 ==
=== ATP – Winston-Salem Open ===
Pablo Carreño Busta was the defending champion, but lost in the second round to Julien Benneteau.

Roberto Bautista Agut won the title, defeating Damir Džumhur in the final, 6–4, 6–4.

==== Main Draw Finals ====
Quarterfinals
1	(Spain) Roberto Bautista Agut	6	7^{7}
WC	(United States) Taylor Fritz	2	6^{3}
14/WC	(Croatia) Borna Ćorić	4	6^{2}
(Germany) Jan-Lennard Struff	6	7^{7}
6	(United States) Steve Johnson	7	3	3
Q	(United Kingdom) Kyle Edmund	5	6	6
(Bosnia and Herzegovina) Damir Džumhur	6	6
13	(South Korea) Chung Hyeon	4	2

Semifinals
1	(Spain) Roberto Bautista Agut	6	6
(Germany) Jan-Lennard Struff	2	4
Q	(United Kingdom) Kyle Edmund	6	5	3
(Bosnia and Herzegovina) Damir Džumhur	1	7	6

Final
1	(Spain) Roberto Bautista Agut	6	6
(Bosnia and Herzegovina) Damir Džumhur	4	4

=== WTA – Connecticut Open (New Haven) ===
Agnieszka Radwańska was the defending champion but lost to the eventual champion Daria Gavrilova in the semi-finals.

==== Main Draw Finals ====
Quarterfinals
1	(Poland) Agnieszka Radwańska	7	6
8	(China) Peng Shuai	5	3
(Australia) Daria Gavrilova	6	6
Q	(Belgium) Kirsten Flipkens	2	4
Q	(Belgium) Elise Mertens	w/o
(China) Zhang Shuai
6	(Russia) Anastasia Pavlyuchenkova	5	4
2	(Slovakia) Dominika Cibulková	7	6

Semifinals
1	(Poland) Agnieszka Radwańska	4	4
(Australia) Daria Gavrilova	6	6
Q	(Belgium) Elise Mertens	1	3
2	(Slovakia) Dominika Cibulková	6	6

Final
(Australia) Daria Gavrilova	4	6	6
2	(Slovakia) Dominika Cibulková	6	3	4

== Weeks 6–7 ==
=== ATP – US Open (New York) ===
Stan Wawrinka was the defending champion but withdrew with a knee injury before the tournament began having announced he would miss the remainder of the 2017 season.

==== Main Draw Finals ====
Quarterfinals
1	(Spain) Rafael Nadal	6	6	6
(Russia) Andrey Rublev	1	2	2
3	(Switzerland) Roger Federer	5	6	6^{8}	4
24	(Argentina) Juan Martín del Potro	7	3	7^{10}	6
17	(United States) Sam Querrey	6^{5}	7^{11}	3	6^{7}
28	(South Africa) Kevin Anderson	7^{7}	6^{9}	6	7^{9}
12	(Spain) Pablo Carreño Busta	6	6	6
29	(Argentina) Diego Schwartzman	4	4	2

Semifinals
1	(Spain) Rafael Nadal	4	6	6	6
24	(Argentina) Juan Martín del Potro	6	0	3	2
28	(South Africa) Kevin Anderson	4	7	6	6
12	(Spain) Pablo Carreño Busta	6	5	3	4

Final
1	(Spain) Rafael Nadal	6	6	6
28	(South Africa) Kevin Anderson	3	3	4

=== WTA – US Open (New York) ===
Angelique Kerber was the defending champion, but lost in the first round to Naomi Osaka.

==== Main Draw Finals ====
Quarterfinals
1	(Czech Republic) Karolína Plíšková	6^{4}	3
20	(United States) Coco Vandeweghe	7^{7}	6
15	(United States) Madison Keys	6	6
Q	(Estonia) Kaia Kanepi	3	3
9	(United States) Venus Williams	6	3	7^{7}
13	(Czech Republic) Petra Kvitová	3	6	6^{2}
PR	(United States) Sloane Stephens	6	3	7^{7}
16	(Latvia) Anastasija Sevastova	3	6	6^{4}

Semifinals
20	(United States) Coco Vandeweghe	1	2
15	(United States) Madison Keys	6	6
9	(United States) Venus Williams	1	6	5
PR	(United States) Sloane Stephens	6	0	7

Final
15	(United States) Madison Keys	3	0
PR	(United States) Sloane Stephens	6	6
