= 2021 Delray Beach Open – Singles =

Singles
- 2021 Delray Beach Open

Final
- Champion: (Poland) Hubert Hurkacz
- Runner-up: (United States) Sebastian Korda
- Score: 6–3, 6–3

Details
- Draw: 28 (4 Q / 3 WC )
- Seeds: 8

Events
Singles	Doubles
- Delray Beach Open

Reilly Opelka was the defending champion, but withdrew from the event.

Hubert Hurkacz won the title, defeating Sebastian Korda in the final, 6–3, 6–3. Hurkacz did not face an opponent ranked inside the top 100 during his title run.

== Seeds ==
The top four seeds receive a bye into the second round.

1. (Chile) Cristian Garín (second round)
2. (United States) John Isner (quarterfinals)
3. (France) Adrian Mannarino (second round)
4. (Poland) Hubert Hurkacz (champion)
5. (United States) Tommy Paul (second round)
6. (United States) Sam Querrey (second round)
7. (Spain) Pablo Andújar (first round)
8. (United States) Frances Tiafoe (quarterfinals)

== Draw ==
Key

- Q = Qualifier
- WC = Wild card
- LL = Lucky loser
- Alt = Alternate
- ITF = ITF entry
- PR = Protected ranking
- SR = Special ranking
- SE = Special exempt
- JE = Junior exempt
- JR = Junior Accelerator Programme entrant
- CO = College Accelerator Programme entrant
- NG = Next Gen Accelerator Program entrant
- w/o = Walkover
- r = Retired
- d = Defaulted

=== Finals ===
Semifinals
Q	(United States) Christian Harrison	6^{4}	4
4	(Poland) Hubert Hurkacz	7^{7}	6
(United Kingdom) Cameron Norrie	3	5
(United States) Sebastian Korda	6	7

Final
4	(Poland) Hubert Hurkacz	6	6
(United States) Sebastian Korda	3	3

=== Top half ===
First round
(Argentina) TM Etcheverry	4	2
Q	(United States) C Harrison	6	6
(Italy) G Mager	3	6	6
WC	(United States) R Harrison	6	1	4
(United States) M McDonald	3	4
6	(United States) S Querrey	6	6
(Colombia) DE Galán	6	6
(Slovakia) A Martin	4	4
WC	(United States) N Rubin	6^{1}	3
Q	(Ecuador) R Quiroz	7^{7}	6
(Croatia) I Karlović	6	5	6
7	(Spain) P Andújar	3	7	4

Second round
1	(Chile) C Garín	6^{3}	2
Q	(United States) C Harrison	7^{7}	6
(Italy) G Mager	7^{10}	6
6	(United States) S Querrey	6^{8}	1
4	(Poland) H Hurkacz	6	6
(Colombia) DE Galán	2	2
Q	(Ecuador) R Quiroz	6	6
(Croatia) I Karlović	2	4

Quarterfinals
Q	(United States) C Harrison	7^{7}	6
(Italy) G Mager	6^{2}	4
4	(Poland) H Hurkacz	6	6
Q	(Ecuador) R Quiroz	4	4

Semifinals
Q	(United States) C Harrison	6^{4}	4
4	(Poland) H Hurkacz	7^{7}	6

=== Bottom half ===
First round
8	(United States) F Tiafoe	6	6
Q	(United States) D Young	3	4
(United States) B Fratangelo	6	6
Q	(United States) K King	2	2
(United Kingdom) C Norrie	6	6
WC	(United States) JC Aragone	2	1
5	(United States) T Paul	6	6
(South Korea) J-s Nam	1	4
(South Korea) S-w Kwon	4	4
(United States) S Korda	6	6
(Brazil) T Bellucci	3	5
(Brazil) T Monteiro	6	7

Second round
8	(United States) F Tiafoe	6	3	6
(United States) B Fratangelo	4	6	1
(United Kingdom) C Norrie	6	7
3	(France) A Mannarino	2	5
5	(United States) T Paul	6	3	2
(United States) S Korda	4	6	6
(Brazil) T Monteiro	4	6^{4}
2	(United States) J Isner	6	7^{7}

Quarterfinals
8	(United States) F Tiafoe	0	6	4
(United Kingdom) C Norrie	6	3	6
(United States) S Korda	6	4	6
2	(United States) J Isner	3	6	3

Semifinals
(United Kingdom) C Norrie	3	5
(United States) S Korda	6	7

== Qualifying ==
=== Seeds ===
1. (Chile) Marcelo Tomás Barrios Vera (first round)
2. (Croatia) Viktor Galović (qualifying competition)
3. (Portugal) Gonçalo Oliveira (qualifying competition)
4. (Brazil) Pedro Sakamoto (first round)
5. (Ecuador) Roberto Quiroz (qualified)
6. (United States) Alexander Ritschard (first round, retired)
7. (United States) Kevin King (qualified)
8. (Germany) Johannes Härteis (first round, retired)

=== Qualifiers ===
1. (United States) Christian Harrison
2. (Ecuador) Roberto Quiroz
3. (United States) Kevin King
4. (United States) Donald Young

=== Qualifying draw ===
==== First qualifier ====
First round
1	(Chile) Marcelo Tomás Barrios Vera	4	4
PR	(United States) Christian Harrison	6	6
WC	(United States) Zane Khan	6	3
6	(United States) Alexander Ritschard	3	1^{r}

Qualifying competition
PR	(United States) Christian Harrison	6	6^{9}	7^{7}
WC	(United States) Zane Khan	1	7^{11}	6^{4}

==== Second qualifier ====
First round
2	(Croatia) Viktor Galović	6	6
(Tunisia) Aziz Dougaz	4	3
Alt	(Ecuador) Gonzalo Escobar	4	7^{8}	5
5	(Ecuador) Roberto Quiroz	6	6^{6}	7

Qualifying competition
2	(Croatia) Viktor Galović	3	5
5	(Ecuador) Roberto Quiroz	6	7

==== Third qualifier ====
First round
3	(Portugal) Gonçalo Oliveira	3	6	6
WC	(Canada) Liam Draxl	6	3	2
Alt	(Zimbabwe) Benjamin Lock	2	3
7	(United States) Kevin King	6	6

Qualifying competition
3	(Portugal) Gonçalo Oliveira	3	3
7	(United States) Kevin King	6	6

==== Fourth qualifier ====
First round
4	(Brazil) Pedro Sakamoto	6	4	2
(United States) Donald Young	3	6	6
(United States) Stefan Kozlov	5
8	(Germany) Johannes Härteis	0^{r}

Qualifying competition
(United States) Donald Young	4	6	6
(United States) Stefan Kozlov	6	4	4
