= 2018 BB&T Atlanta Open – Singles =

Singles
- 2018 BB&T Atlanta Open

Final
- Champion: (United States) John Isner
- Runner-up: (United States) Ryan Harrison
- Score: 5–7, 6–3, 6–4

Events
Singles	Doubles
← 2017 ·	BB&T Atlanta Open	· 2019 →

John Isner was the defending champion and successfully defended his title, defeating Ryan Harrison in a rematch of the 2017 final, 5–7, 6–3, 6–4.

== Seeds ==
The top four seeds receive a bye into the second round.

1. (United States) John Isner (champion)
2. (Australia) Nick Kyrgios (quarterfinals, retired)
3. (South Korea) Chung Hyeon (quarterfinals)
4. (Australia) Matthew Ebden (semifinals)
5. (United States) Frances Tiafoe (second round)
6. (France) Jérémy Chardy (second round)
7. (Germany) Mischa Zverev (quarterfinals)
8. (United States) Ryan Harrison (final)

== Draw ==
Key

- Q = Qualifier
- WC = Wild card
- LL = Lucky loser
- Alt = Alternate
- ITF = ITF entry
- PR = Protected ranking
- SR = Special ranking
- SE = Special exempt
- JE = Junior exempt
- JR = Junior Accelerator Programme entrant
- CO = College Accelerator Programme entrant
- NG = Next Gen Accelerator Program entrant
- w/o = Walkover
- r = Retired
- d = Defaulted

=== Finals ===
Semifinals
1	(United States) John Isner	6	6^{6}	6
4	(Australia) Matthew Ebden	4	7^{8}	1
8	(United States) Ryan Harrison	2	6	6
(United Kingdom) Cameron Norrie	6	3	2

Final
1	(United States) John Isner	5	6	6
8	(United States) Ryan Harrison	7	3	4

=== Top half ===
First round
(Australia) A de Minaur	1	7^{7}	7^{7}
LL	(Poland) H Hurkacz	6	6^{0}	6^{5}
(Russia) M Youzhny	6	6
WC	(United States) E Reinberg	2	0
SE	(United States) T Smyczek	3	7^{10}	3
7	(Germany) M Zverev	6	6^{8}	6
(Croatia) I Karlović	6	6^{5}	6^{6}
WC	(United States) D Young	2	7^{7}	7^{8}
Q	(Australia) A Bolt	4	1
(Cyprus) M Baghdatis	6	6
(Romania) M Copil	4	4
5	(United States) F Tiafoe	6	6

Second round
1	(United States) J Isner	6	6
(Australia) A de Minaur	3	2
(Russia) M Youzhny	4	2
7	(Germany) M Zverev	6	6
4	(Australia) M Ebden	6	6
WC	(United States) D Young	4	4
(Cyprus) M Baghdatis	7	6
5	(United States) F Tiafoe	5	1

Quarterfinals
1	(United States) J Isner	7	4	6
7	(Germany) M Zverev	5	6	1
4	(Australia) M Ebden	6	6
(Cyprus) M Baghdatis	3	2

Semifinals
1	(United States) J Isner	6	6^{6}	6
4	(Australia) M Ebden	4	7^{8}	1

=== Bottom half ===
First round
8	(United States) R Harrison	4	7^{7}	6
PR	(Australia) J Duckworth	6	6^{2}	1
(Slovakia) L Lacko	6	6
Q	(India) P Gunneswaran	2	2
SE	(India) R Ramanathan	4	4
(United States) T Fritz	6	6
6	(France) J Chardy	6	6
(Lithuania) R Berankis	4	3
(United Kingdom) C Norrie	7	6
(Tunisia) M Jaziri	5	0
Q	(Australia) T Kokkinakis	3	4
Q	(United States) N Rubin	6	6

Second round
8	(United States) R Harrison	2	6	6
(Slovakia) L Lacko	6	2	3
(United States) T Fritz	4	6^{5}
3/WC	(South Korea) H Chung	6	7^{7}
6	(France) J Chardy	7	4	4
(United Kingdom) C Norrie	5	6	6
Q	(United States) N Rubin	5	2
2	(Australia) N Kyrgios	7	6

Quarterfinals
8	(United States) R Harrison	6^{3}	6	7^{7}
3/WC	(South Korea) H Chung	7^{7}	2	6^{5}
(United Kingdom) C Norrie	7	3
2	(Australia) N Kyrgios	5	0^{r}

Semifinals
8	(United States) R Harrison	2	6	6
(United Kingdom) C Norrie	6	3	2

== Qualifying ==
=== Seeds ===
1. (United States) Denis Kudla (qualifying competition)
2. (Poland) Hubert Hurkacz (qualifying competition, lucky loser)
3. (Chinese Taipei) Jason Jung (qualifying competition)
4. (Australia) Bernard Tomic (first round)
5. (United States) Noah Rubin (qualified)
6. (Egypt) Mohamed Safwat (first round)
7. (Australia) Thanasi Kokkinakis (qualified)
8. (Australia) Alex Bolt (qualified)

=== Qualifiers ===
1. (Australia) Alex Bolt
2. (Australia) Thanasi Kokkinakis
3. (United States) Noah Rubin
4. (India) Prajnesh Gunneswaran

=== Lucky loser ===
1. (Poland) Hubert Hurkacz

=== Qualifying draw ===
==== First qualifier ====
First round
1	(United States) Denis Kudla	3	7^{7}	6
Alt	(Australia) John-Patrick Smith	6	6^{4}	3
WC	(United States) Garrett Johns	1	4
8	(Australia) Alex Bolt	6	6

Qualifying competition
1	(United States) Denis Kudla	7^{7}	3	3
8	(Australia) Alex Bolt	6^{4}	6	6

==== Second qualifier ====
First round
2	(Poland) Hubert Hurkacz	6	6
PR	(Ukraine) Illya Marchenko	1	1
WC	(New Zealand) Kiranpal Pannu	3	4
7	(Australia) Thanasi Kokkinakis	6	6

Qualifying competition
2	(Poland) Hubert Hurkacz	2	6^{6}
7	(Australia) Thanasi Kokkinakis	6	7^{8}

==== Third qualifier ====
First round
3	(Chinese Taipei) Jason Jung	6	6
Alt	(United States) Christopher Eubanks	4	3
(United States) Evan King	4	4
5	(United States) Noah Rubin	6	6

Qualifying competition
3	(Chinese Taipei) Jason Jung	4	2
5	(United States) Noah Rubin	6	6

==== Fourth qualifier ====
First round
4	(Australia) Bernard Tomic	3	6	3
(United States) Tommy Paul	6	4	6
(India) Prajnesh Gunneswaran	0	6	6
6	(Egypt) Mohamed Safwat	6	3	1

Qualifying competition
(United States) Tommy Paul	3	3
(India) Prajnesh Gunneswaran	6	6
