= 2017 BB&T Atlanta Open – Singles =

Singles
- 2017 BB&T Atlanta Open

Final
- Champion: (United States) John Isner
- Runner-up: (United States) Ryan Harrison
- Score: 7–6^{(8–6)}, 7–6^{(9–7)}

Details
- Draw: 28 (4 Q / 3 WC )
- Seeds: 8

Events
Singles	Doubles
← 2016 ·	BB&T Atlanta Open	· 2018 →

Nick Kyrgios was the defending champion, but withdrew before the tournament began.

John Isner won the title, defeating Ryan Harrison in the final, 7–6^{(8–6)}, 7–6^{(9–7)}.

== Seeds ==
The top four seeds receive a bye into the second round.

1. (United States) Jack Sock (quarterfinals)
2. (United States) John Isner (champion)
3. (Luxembourg) Gilles Müller (semifinals)
4. (United States) Ryan Harrison (final)
5. (United Kingdom) Kyle Edmund (semifinals)
6. (United States) Donald Young (second round)
7. (South Korea) Chung Hyeon (first round)
8. (United States) Jared Donaldson (second round)

== Draw ==
=== Key ===
- Q = Qualifier
- WC = Wild card
- LL = Lucky loser
- Alt = Alternate
- SE = Special exempt
- PR = Protected ranking
- ITF = ITF entry
- JE = Junior exempt
- w/o = Walkover
- r = Retired
- d = Defaulted
- SR = Special ranking

=== Finals ===
Semifinals
5	(United Kingdom) Kyle Edmund	7^{7}	3	4
4	(United States) Ryan Harrison	6^{5}	6	6
3	(Luxembourg) Gilles Müller	4	2
2	(United States) John Isner	6	6

Final
4	(United States) Ryan Harrison	6^{6}	6^{7}
2	(United States) John Isner	7^{8}	7^{9}

=== Top half ===
First round
(Israel) D Sela	7	6
(Russia) K Kravchuk	5	2
SE	(Germany) P Gojowczyk	4	6	7^{7}
(Argentina) G Pella	6	3	6^{5}
(Cyprus) M Baghdatis	3	5
5	(United Kingdom) K Edmund	6	7
(United States) F Tiafoe	7	4	6^{5}
PR	(Australia) J Millman	5	6	7^{7}
WC	(United States) T Fritz	6^{5}	4
WC	(United States) C Eubanks	7^{7}	6
(United States) E Escobedo	3	1
8	(United States) J Donaldson	6	6

Second round
1	(United States) J Sock	6	6
(Israel) D Sela	4	3
SE	(Germany) P Gojowczyk	6	4	5
5	(United Kingdom) K Edmund	2	6	7
4	(United States) R Harrison	6^{2}	7^{7}	7
PR	(Australia) J Millman	7^{7}	6^{4}	5
WC	(United States) C Eubanks	6	4	6
8	(United States) J Donaldson	4	6	2

Quarterfinals
1	(United States) J Sock	4	1
5	(United Kingdom) K Edmund	6	6
4	(United States) R Harrison	6	6
WC	(United States) C Eubanks	1	2

Semifinals
5	(United Kingdom) K Edmund	7^{7}	3	4
4	(United States) R Harrison	6^{5}	6	6

=== Bottom half ===
First round
7	(South Korea) H Chung	6	2	3
Q	(United States) T Paul	4	6	6
WC	(United States) R Opelka	7	6^{14}	1
(Tunisia) M Jaziri	5	7^{16}	6
Q	(United States) S Kozlov	5	6^{7}
Q	(France) Q Halys	7	7^{9}
6	(United States) D Young	6	6
Q	(United States) T Smyczek	4	2
(Slovakia) L Lacko	6	6
(Italy) T Fabbiano	1	2
SE	(United States) B Fratangelo	5	6	6^{3}
(Canada) V Pospisil	7	4	7^{7}

Second round
Q	(United States) T Paul	6^{5}	6	6
(Tunisia) M Jaziri	7^{7}	4	3
Q	(France) Q Halys	4	7^{7}	3
3	(Luxembourg) G Müller	6	6^{1}	6
6	(United States) D Young	3	1
(Slovakia) L Lacko	6	6
(Canada) V Pospisil	3	4
2	(United States) J Isner	6	6

Quarterfinals
Q	(United States) T Paul	3	1
3	(Luxembourg) G Müller	6	6
(Slovakia) L Lacko	5	4
2	(United States) J Isner	7	6

Semifinals
3	(Luxembourg) G Müller	4	2
2	(United States) J Isner	6	6

== Qualifying ==
=== Seeds ===
1. (Ukraine) Illya Marchenko (qualifying competition, withdrew)
2. (United States) Stefan Kozlov (qualified)
3. (France) Quentin Halys (qualified)
4. (United States) Mitchell Krueger (qualifying competition)
5. (United States) Tim Smyczek (qualified)
6. (United States) Dennis Novikov (qualifying competition)
7. (United Kingdom) Brydan Klein (qualifying competition)
8. (United States) Tommy Paul (qualified)

=== Qualifiers ===
1. (United States) Tim Smyczek
2. (United States) Stefan Kozlov
3. (France) Quentin Halys
4. (United States) Tommy Paul

=== Qualifying draw ===
==== First qualifier ====
First round
1	(Ukraine) Illya Marchenko	6	6
(Italy) Alessandro Bega	4	4
Alt	(India) Jeevan Nedunchezhiyan	6^{3}	3
5	(United States) Tim Smyczek	7^{7}	6

Qualifying competition
1	(Ukraine) Illya Marchenko
5	(United States) Tim Smyczek	w/o

==== Second qualifier ====
First round
2	(United States) Stefan Kozlov	6	6
WC	(Romania) Cătălin-Ionuț Gârd	3	1
WC	(United States) Trent Bryde	3	0
7	(United Kingdom) Brydan Klein	6	6

Qualifying competition
2	(United States) Stefan Kozlov	6^{9}	6	7^{7}
7	(United Kingdom) Brydan Klein	7^{11}	2	6^{4}

==== Third qualifier ====
First round
3	(France) Quentin Halys	6	7
(France) Hugo Nys	3	5
(Croatia) Ante Pavić	4	3
6	(United States) Dennis Novikov	6	6

Qualifying competition
3	(France) Quentin Halys	6^{6}	7	6
6	(United States) Dennis Novikov	7^{8}	5	4

==== Fourth qualifier ====
First round
4	(United States) Mitchell Krueger	6	6
Alt	(Thailand) Pol Wattanakul	1	2
Alt	(United States) Andrew Carter	6	0	1
8	(United States) Tommy Paul	4	6	6

Qualifying competition
4	(United States) Mitchell Krueger	6	2	3
8	(United States) Tommy Paul	2	6	6
