= 2021 Delray Beach Open – Doubles =

Doubles
- 2021 Delray Beach Open

Final
- Champions: (Uruguay) Ariel Behar (Ecuador) Gonzalo Escobar
- Runners-up: (United States) Christian Harrison (United States) Ryan Harrison
- Score: 6–7^{(5–7)}, 7–6^{(7–4)}, [10–4]

Details
- Draw: 16
- Seeds: 4

Events
Singles	Doubles
- Delray Beach Open

Bob and Mike Bryan were the two-time defending champions, but they retired in August 2020 so they did not defend their titles. Ariel Behar and Gonzalo Escobar won the title, defeating Christian and Ryan Harrison in the final, 6–7^{(5–7)}, 7–6^{(7–4)}, [10–4].

== Seeds ==
1. (El Salvador) Marcelo Arévalo / (Netherlands) Jean-Julien Rojer (first round)
2. (New Zealand) Marcus Daniell / (Austria) Philipp Oswald (first round)
3. (Brazil) Marcelo Demoliner / (Mexico) Santiago González (first round)
4. (United Kingdom) Luke Bambridge / (United Kingdom) Dominic Inglot (first round)

== Draw ==
Key

- Q = Qualifier
- WC = Wild card
- LL = Lucky loser
- Alt = Alternate
- ITF = ITF entry
- PR = Protected ranking
- SR = Special ranking
- SE = Special exempt
- JE = Junior exempt
- JR = Junior Accelerator Programme entrant
- CO = College Accelerator Programme entrant
- NG = Next Gen Accelerator Program entrant
- w/o = Walkover
- r = Retired
- d = Defaulted

=== Draw ===
First round
1	(El Salvador) M Arévalo (Netherlands) J-J Rojer	5	6^{3}
(Uruguay) A Behar (Ecuador) G Escobar	7	7^{7}
(United Kingdom) C Norrie (United Kingdom) J O'Mara	6	6
(United States) N Lammons (United States) J Withrow	4	4
4	(United Kingdom) L Bambridge (United Kingdom) D Inglot	6	3	[4]
(United States) N Monroe (United States) F Tiafoe	3	6	[10]
PR	(United States) M McDonald (United States) T Paul	6	6^{4}	[10]
(Chile) C Garín (Sweden) A Göransson	4	7^{7}	[4]
Alt	(United States) H Johnson (United States) Y Johnson	4	6^{2}
WC	(United States) C Harrison (United States) R Harrison	6	7^{7}
(Austria) O Marach (Venezuela) LD Martínez	6	6
3	(Brazil) M Demoliner (Mexico) S González	2	3
(United States) A Krajicek (United States) S Querrey	7^{7}	6
WC	(United States) B Fratangelo (United States) D Novikov	6^{4}	3
(Argentina) A Molteni (Monaco) H Nys	6^{5}	6	[11]
2	(New Zealand) M Daniell (Austria) P Oswald	7^{7}	4	[9]

Quarterfinals
(Uruguay) A Behar (Ecuador) G Escobar	7	4	[10]
(United Kingdom) C Norrie (United Kingdom) J O'Mara	5	6	[4]
(United States) N Monroe (United States) F Tiafoe	3	1
PR	(United States) M McDonald (United States) T Paul	6	6
WC	(United States) C Harrison (United States) R Harrison	6	6
(Austria) O Marach (Venezuela) LD Martínez	4	2
(United States) A Krajicek (United States) S Querrey	3	4
(Argentina) A Molteni (Monaco) H Nys	6	6

Semifinals
(Uruguay) A Behar (Ecuador) G Escobar	6	5	[10]
PR	(United States) M McDonald (United States) T Paul	1	7	[1]
WC	(United States) C Harrison (United States) R Harrison	6	6
(Argentina) A Molteni (Monaco) H Nys	2	2

Final
(Uruguay) A Behar (Ecuador) G Escobar	6^{5}	7^{7}	[10]
WC	(United States) C Harrison (United States) R Harrison	7^{7}	6^{4}	[4]
