= 2019 BB&T Atlanta Open – Doubles =

Doubles
- 2019 BB&T Atlanta Open

Final
- Champions: (United Kingdom) Dominic Inglot (United States) Austin Krajicek
- Runners-up: (United States) Bob Bryan (United States) Mike Bryan
- Score: 6–4, 6–7^{(5–7)}, [11–9]

Events
Singles	Doubles
← 2018 ·	BB&T Atlanta Open	· 2021 →

Nicholas Monroe and John-Patrick Smith were the defending champions, but chose not to participate together. Monroe played alongside Frances Tiafoe, but lost in the first round to Marcelo Arévalo and Miguel Ángel Reyes-Varela. Smith teamed up with Ben McLachlan but lost in the quarterfinals to Jack Sock and Jackson Withrow.

Dominic Inglot and Austin Krajicek won the title, defeating Bob and Mike Bryan in the final, 6–4, 6–7^{(5–7)}, [11–9].

== Seeds ==
1. (United States) Bob Bryan / (United States) Mike Bryan (final)
2. (United Kingdom) Dominic Inglot / (United States) Austin Krajicek (champions)
3. (Mexico) Santiago González / (Pakistan) Aisam-ul-Haq Qureshi (first round)
4. (Moldova) Radu Albot / (New Zealand) Artem Sitak (Semifinals)

== Draw ==
=== Key ===
- Q = Qualifier
- WC = Wild card
- LL = Lucky loser
- Alt = Alternate
- ITF = ITF entry
- PR = Protected ranking
- SR = Special ranking
- SE = Special exempt
- JE = Junior exempt
- JR = Junior Accelerator Programme entrant
- CO = College Accelerator Programme entrant
- NG = Next Gen Accelerator Program entrant
- w/o = Walkover
- r = Retired
- d = Defaulted

=== Draw ===
First round
1	(United States) B Bryan (United States) M Bryan	6	6
WC	(United States) C Eubanks (United States) D Young	4	2
(Serbia) M Kecmanović (Sweden) R Lindstedt	6	3	[11]
(Israel) J Erlich (India) D Sharan	2	6	[13]
4	(Moldova) R Albot (New Zealand) A Sitak	7^{9}	7
WC	(Australia) N Kyrgios (United States) T Paul	6^{7}	5
(El Salvador) M Arévalo (Mexico) MÁ Reyes-Varela	6	6
(United States) N Monroe (United States) F Tiafoe	3	4
(United Kingdom) D Evans (Australia) J Thompson	6^{6}	1
(United States) J Sock (United States) J Withrow	7^{8}	6
(Japan) B McLachlan (Australia) J-P Smith	7^{9}	7^{7}
3	(Mexico) S González (Pakistan) A-u-H Qureshi	6^{7}	6^{4}
(Romania) M Copil (India) L Paes	6^{2}	4
(United States) T Fritz (United Kingdom) C Norrie	7^{7}	6
(Australia) M Ebden (United States) T Sandgren	6	6^{5}	[5]
2	(United Kingdom) D Inglot (United States) A Krajicek	4	7^{7}	[10]

Quarterfinals
1	(United States) B Bryan (United States) M Bryan	6	6^{4}	[10]
(Israel) J Erlich (India) D Sharan	4	7^{7}	[7]
4	(Moldova) R Albot (New Zealand) A Sitak	6	6
(El Salvador) M Arévalo (Mexico) MÁ Reyes-Varela	4	3
(United States) J Sock (United States) J Withrow	6	6
(Japan) B McLachlan (Australia) J-P Smith	2	3
(United States) T Fritz (United Kingdom) C Norrie	7^{8}	6^{3}	[5]
2	(United Kingdom) D Inglot (United States) A Krajicek	6^{6}	7^{7}	[10]

Semifinals
1	(United States) B Bryan (United States) M Bryan	7	6
4	(Moldova) R Albot (New Zealand) A Sitak	5	3
(United States) J Sock (United States) J Withrow	6^{4}	3
2	(United Kingdom) D Inglot (United States) A Krajicek	7^{7}	6

Final
1	(United States) B Bryan (United States) M Bryan	4	7^{7}	[9]
2	(United Kingdom) D Inglot (United States) A Krajicek	6	6^{5}	[11]
