= 2021 Delray Beach Open =

- Date: January 7–13
- Edition: 29th
- Draw: 28S / 16D
- Prize money: $418,195
- Surface: Hard / outdoor
- Location: Delray Beach, Florida, United States
- Venue: Delray Beach Tennis Center

Champions

Singles
- (Poland) Hubert Hurkacz

Doubles
- (Uruguay) Ariel Behar / (Ecuador) Gonzalo Escobar
- Delray Beach Open

The 2021 Delray Beach Open (officially known as 2021 Delray Beach Open by VITACOST.com for sponsorship reasons) was a professional men's tennis tournament played on hard courts. It was the 29th edition of the tournament, and part of the 2021 ATP Tour. It took place in Delray Beach, Florida, United States between January 7 and January 13, 2021. Due to the COVID-19 pandemic, it was rescheduled from its original dates in mid February. Fourth-seeded Hubert Hurkacz won the singles title.

== Finals ==
=== Singles ===
- (Poland) Hubert Hurkacz defeated (United States) Sebastian Korda, 6–3, 6–3

=== Doubles ===
- (Uruguay) Ariel Behar / (Ecuador) Gonzalo Escobar defeated (United States) Christian Harrison / (United States) Ryan Harrison, 6–7^{(5–7)}, 7–6^{(7–4)}, [10–4]

== Points and prize money ==
=== Point distribution ===
Event	W	F	SF	QF	Round of 16	Round of 32	Q	Q2	Q1
Singles	250	150	90	45	20	0	12	6	0
Doubles	250	150	90	45	0	—N/a	—N/a	—N/a	—N/a

=== Prize money ===
Event	W	F	SF	QF	Round of 16	Round of 32	Q2	Q1
Singles	$30,840	$22,780	$16,390	$11,110	$7,445	$5,000	$2,555	$1,505
Doubles*	$10,080	$7,370	$5,600	$4,010	$2,930	—N/a	—N/a	—N/a

_{*per team}

== Singles main-draw entrants ==
=== Seeds ===
Country	Player	Rank^{1}	Seed
CHI	Cristian Garín	22	1
USA	John Isner	25	2
FRA	Adrian Mannarino	34	3
POL	Hubert Hurkacz	35	4
USA	Tommy Paul	52	5
USA	Sam Querrey	56	6
ESP	Pablo Andújar	59	7
USA	Frances Tiafoe	62	8

- ^{1} Rankings as of January 4, 2021.

=== Other entrants ===
The following players received wildcards into the main draw:

- (United States) JC Aragone
- (United States) Ryan Harrison
- (United States) Noah Rubin

The following players received entry from the qualifying draw:

- (United States) Christian Harrison
- (United States) Kevin King
- (Ecuador) Roberto Quiroz
- (United States) Donald Young

=== Withdrawals ===
Before the tournament

- (Argentina) Federico Delbonis → replaced by (United States) Sebastian Korda
- (United Kingdom) Dan Evans → replaced by (Colombia) Daniel Elahi Galán
- (Germany) Dominik Koepfer → replaced by (United States) Mackenzie McDonald
- (Japan) Kei Nishikori → replaced by (United States) Bjorn Fratangelo
- (United States) Reilly Opelka → replaced by (Brazil) Thomaz Bellucci
- (Canada) Vasek Pospisil → replaced by (South Korea) Nam Ji-sung
- (Canada) Milos Raonic → replaced by (Argentina) Tomás Martín Etcheverry
- (Sweden) Mikael Ymer → replaced by (Croatia) Ivo Karlović

== Doubles main-draw entrants ==
=== Seeds ===
Country	Player	Country	Player	Rank^{1}	Seed
ESA	Marcelo Arévalo	NED	Jean-Julien Rojer	75	1
NZL	Marcus Daniell	AUT	Philipp Oswald	87	2
BRA	Marcelo Demoliner	MEX	Santiago González	92	3
GBR	Luke Bambridge	GBR	Dominic Inglot	121	4

- ^{1} Rankings are as of January 4, 2021.

=== Other entrants ===
The following pairs received wildcards into the main draw:

- (United States) Bjorn Fratangelo / (United States) Dennis Novikov
- (United States) Ryan Harrison / (United States) Christian Harrison

The following pair received entry into the main draw using a protected ranking:

- (United States) Mackenzie McDonald / (United States) Tommy Paul

The following pair received entry into the main draw as alternates:

- (United States) Hunter Johnson / (United States) Yates Johnson

=== Withdrawals ===
Before the tournament

- (Philippines) Treat Huey / (Canada) Milos Raonic → replaced by (United States) Nathaniel Lammons / (United States) Jackson Withrow
- (Poland) Hubert Hurkacz / (United States) John Isner → replaced by (United States) Hunter Johnson / (United States) Yates Johnson
- (United Kingdom) Ken Skupski / (United Kingdom) Neal Skupski → replaced by (Austria) Oliver Marach / (Venezuela) Luis David Martínez
