= 2018 BB&T Atlanta Open – Doubles =

Doubles
- 2018 BB&T Atlanta Open

Final
- Champions: (United States) Nicholas Monroe (Australia) John-Patrick Smith
- Runners-up: (United States) Ryan Harrison (United States) Rajeev Ram
- Score: 3–6, 7–6^{(7–5)}, [10–8]

Events
Singles	Doubles
← 2017 ·	BB&T Atlanta Open	· 2019 →

Bob and Mike Bryan were the defending champions, but Bob Bryan could not participate due to injury. Mike Bryan played alongside Frances Tiafoe, but lost in the quarterfinals to Ryan Harrison and Rajeev Ram.

Nicholas Monroe and John-Patrick Smith won the title, defeating Harrison and Ram in the final, 3–6, 7–6^{(7–5)}, [10–8].

== Seeds ==
1. (India) Divij Sharan / (New Zealand) Artem Sitak (first round)
2. (United States) Ryan Harrison / (United States) Rajeev Ram (final)
3. (United States) Nicholas Monroe / (Australia) John-Patrick Smith (champions)
4. (Israel) Jonathan Erlich / (United Kingdom) Joe Salisbury (first round)

== Draw ==
=== Key ===
- Q = Qualifier
- WC = Wild card
- LL = Lucky loser
- Alt = Alternate
- SE = Special exempt
- PR = Protected ranking
- ITF = ITF entry
- JE = Junior exempt
- w/o = Walkover
- r = Retired
- d = Defaulted
- SR = Special ranking

=== Draw ===
First round
1	(India) D Sharan (New Zealand) A Sitak	4	5
(Monaco) R Arneodo (France) J Chardy	6	7
(Romania) M Copil (Germany) M Zverev	4	4
(United Kingdom) L Bambridge (United Kingdom) J O'Mara	6	6
3	(United States) N Monroe (Australia) J-P Smith	7^{7}	6
WC	(Australia) T Kokkinakis (Australia) N Kyrgios	6^{2}	4
WC	(United States) C Eubanks (United States) D Young	4	7^{7}	[10]
(Australia) M Ebden (United States) J Withrow	6	6^{3}	[8]
(India) P Raja (United Kingdom) K Skupski	6	6
(Lithuania) R Berankis (Tunisia) M Jaziri	4	3
(United States) T Fritz (United Kingdom) C Norrie	6	6
4	(Israel) J Erlich (United Kingdom) J Salisbury	3	4
(United States) M Bryan (United States) F Tiafoe	7	6
(United States) J Cerretani (India) L Paes	5	1
(El Salvador) M Arévalo (Mexico) MÁ Reyes-Varela	5	1
2	(United States) R Harrison (United States) R Ram	7	6

Quarterfinals
(Monaco) R Arneodo (France) J Chardy	6	7
(United Kingdom) L Bambridge (United Kingdom) J O'Mara	2	5
3	(United States) N Monroe (Australia) J-P Smith	6	2	[10]
WC	(United States) C Eubanks (United States) D Young	3	6	[4]
(India) P Raja (United Kingdom) K Skupski	3	6	[11]
(United States) T Fritz (United Kingdom) C Norrie	6	1	[9]
(United States) M Bryan (United States) F Tiafoe	6^{6}	4
2	(United States) R Harrison (United States) R Ram	7^{8}	6

Semifinals
(Monaco) R Arneodo (France) J Chardy	5	6	[6]
3	(United States) N Monroe (Australia) J-P Smith	7	4	[10]
(India) P Raja (United Kingdom) K Skupski	3	4
2	(United States) R Harrison (United States) R Ram	6	6

Final
3	(United States) N Monroe (Australia) J-P Smith	3	7^{7}	[10]
2	(United States) R Harrison (United States) R Ram	6	6^{5}	[8]
