= Cole Gromley =

American tennis player

Colton "Cole" Gromley
- Country (sports): United States
- Born: December 26, 1999 (age 26) Norcross, United States
- College: Georgia Tech

Singles
- Career record: 0–1 (at ATP Tour level, Grand Slam level, and in Davis Cup)
- Career titles: 0

Doubles
- Career record: 0–0 (at ATP Tour level, Grand Slam level, and in Davis Cup)
- Career titles: 0
- Last updated on: 22 July 2019.

Colton Gromley (born December 26, 1999) is an American tennis player.

Gromley made his ATP main draw debut at the 2019 BB&T Atlanta Open after receiving a wildcard for the singles main draw.

Gromley plays college tennis for Georgia Tech.
