= 2018 BB&T Atlanta Open =

- Date: July 23–29
- Edition: 31st
- Category: ATP World Tour 250
- Draw: 28S / 16D
- Prize money: $668,460
- Surface: Hard
- Location: Atlanta, United States
- Venue: Atlantic Station

Champions

Singles
- (United States) John Isner

Doubles
- (United States) Nicholas Monroe / (Australia) John-Patrick Smith
- Atlanta Open

The 2018 BB&T Atlanta Open was a professional men's tennis tournament played on hard courts. It was the 31st edition of the tournament, and part of the 2018 ATP World Tour. It took place at Atlantic Station in Atlanta, United States between July 23 and 29, 2018. It was the first men's event of the 2018 US Open Series. First-seeded John Isner won the singles title.

== Singles main-draw entrants ==
=== Seeds ===
Country	Player	Rank^{1}	Seed
USA	John Isner	8	1
AUS	Nick Kyrgios	18	2
KOR	Chung Hyeon	22	3
AUS	Matthew Ebden	43	4
USA	Frances Tiafoe	45	5
FRA	Jérémy Chardy	46	6
GER	Mischa Zverev	47	7
USA	Ryan Harrison	55	8

- ^{1} Rankings are as of July 16, 2018.

=== Other entrants ===
The following players received wildcards into the main draw:

- (South Korea) Chung Hyeon
- (United States) Emil Reinberg
- (United States) Donald Young

The following players received entry using a protected ranking into the main draw:

- (Australia) James Duckworth

The following players received entry as special exempts:

- (India) Ramkumar Ramanathan
- (United States) Tim Smyczek

The following players received entry from the qualifying draw:

- (Australia) Alex Bolt
- (India) Prajnesh Gunneswaran
- (Australia) Thanasi Kokkinakis
- (United States) Noah Rubin

The following player received entry as a lucky loser:

- (Poland) Hubert Hurkacz

=== Withdrawals ===
Before the tournament

- (Bosnia and Herzegovina) Mirza Bašić →replaced by (Australia) James Duckworth
- (India) Yuki Bhambri →replaced by (Australia) Alex de Minaur
- (United States) Jared Donaldson →replaced by (Romania) Marius Copil
- (Luxembourg) Gilles Müller →replaced by (Lithuania) Ričardas Berankis
- (United States) Jack Sock →replaced by (Poland) Hubert Hurkacz

=== Retirements ===
- (Australia) Nick Kyrgios

== Doubles main-draw entrants ==
=== Seeds ===
Country	Player	Country	Player	Rank^{1}	Seed
IND	Divij Sharan	NZL	Artem Sitak	70	1
USA	Ryan Harrison	USA	Rajeev Ram	86	2
USA	Nicholas Monroe	AUS	John-Patrick Smith	110	3
ISR	Jonathan Erlich	GBR	Joe Salisbury	130	4

- ^{1} Rankings are as of 16 July 2018.

=== Other entrants ===
The following pairs received wildcards into the doubles main draw:

- (United States) Christopher Eubanks / (United States) Donald Young
- (Australia) Thanasi Kokkinakis / (Australia) Nick Kyrgios

== Finals ==
=== Singles ===
- (United States) John Isner defeated (United States) Ryan Harrison, 5–7, 6–3, 6–4

=== Doubles ===
- (United States) Nicholas Monroe / (Australia) John-Patrick Smith vs. (United States) Ryan Harrison / (United States) Rajeev Ram, 3–6, 7–6^{(7–5)}, [10–8]
