= Eric Sock =

American tennis player

- Country (sports): United States
- Born: September 22, 1990 (age 35)
- College: Nebraska

Singles
- Career record: 0–0 (at ATP Tour level, Grand Slam level, and in Davis Cup)
- Career titles: 0

Doubles
- Career record: 0–1 (at ATP Tour level, Grand Slam level, and in Davis Cup)
- Career titles: 0
- Last updated on: July 26, 2017.

Eric Sock (born September 22, 1990) is an American tennis player.

== Tennis career ==
Sock played college tennis at the University of Nebraska–Lincoln.
