= Emil Reinberg =

American tennis player

- Country (sports): United States
- Born: 20 April 1997 (age 28) Atlanta, United States
- Height: 1.88 m (6 ft 2 in)
- Plays: Right-handed (two-handed backhand)
- College: Georgia
- Prize money: $27,787

Singles
- Career record: 0–1 (at ATP Tour level, Grand Slam level, and in Davis Cup)
- Career titles: 0 ITF
- Highest ranking: No. 670 (1 August 2022)

Doubles
- Career record: 0–1 (at ATP Tour level, Grand Slam level, and in Davis Cup)
- Career titles: 1 ITF
- Highest ranking: No. 728 (1 April 2019)

Emil Reinberg (born 20 April 1997) is an American tennis player.

Reinberg has a career high ATP singles ranking of No. 670 achieved on 1 August 2022 and a career high ATP doubles ranking of No. 728 achieved on 1 April 2019.

Reinberg made his ATP main draw debut at the 2017 BB&T Atlanta Open in the doubles draw partnering Jordan Cox.

Reinberg played college tennis at the University of Georgia.

== Challenger and World Tennis Tour Finals ==
=== Singles: 1 (0-1) ===
Legend (singles) ATP Challenger Tour (0-0) ITF Futures Tour (0-1)	Titles by Surface Hard (0–1) Clay (0-0) Grass (0–0) Carpet (0–0)

Result	W–L	Date	Tournament	Tier	Surface	Opponent	Score
Loss	0–1	Feb 2022	M15, Cancun, Mexico	World Tennis Tour	Hard	(United States) Brandon Holt	5-7, 0-6
