= Ryan Harrison =

American tennis player (born 1992)

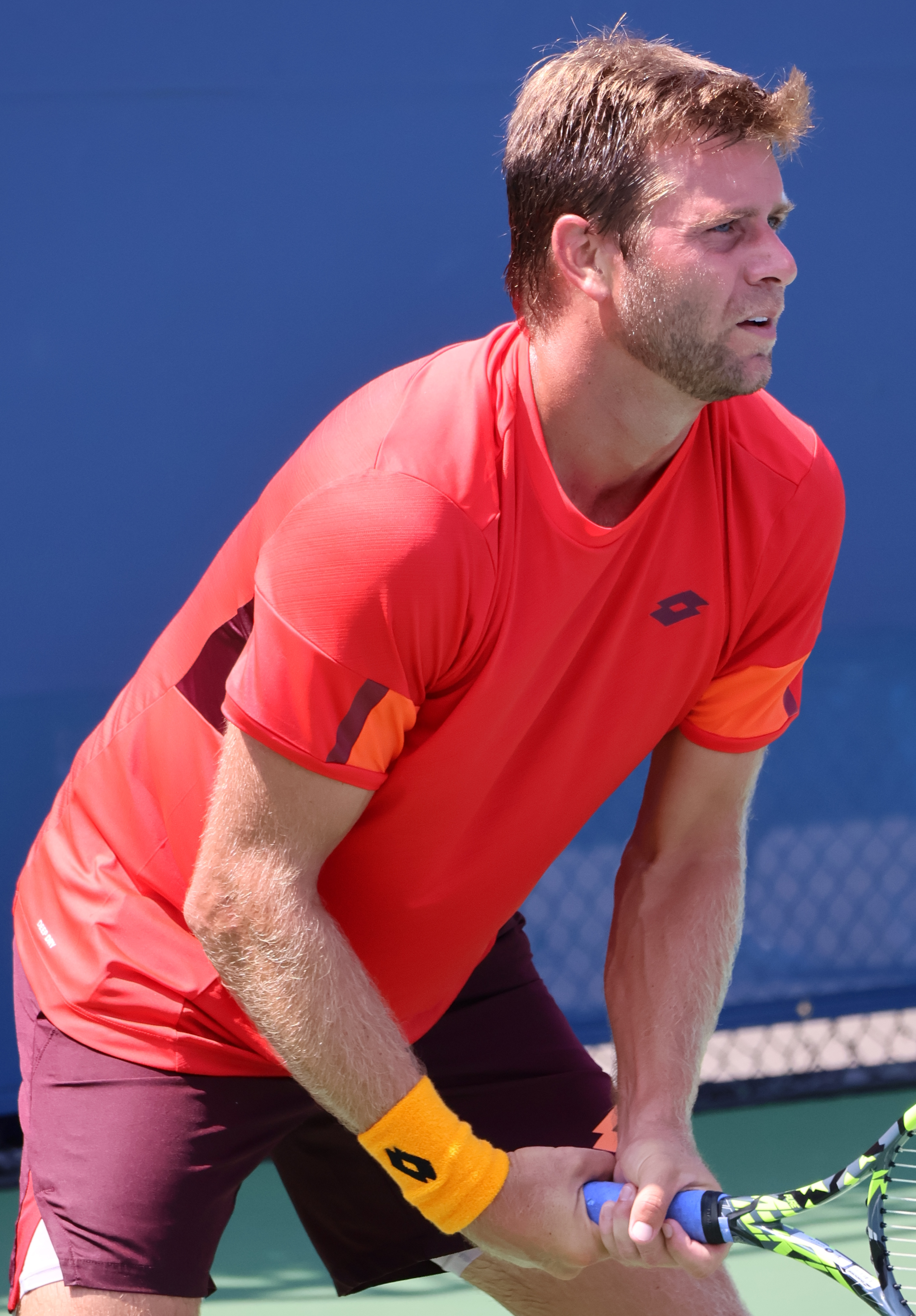
- Harrison at the 2023 Washington Open
- Country (sports): United States
- Residence: Atlanta, Georgia, US
- Born: May 7, 1992 (age 34) Shreveport, Louisiana, US
- Height: 1.85 m (6 ft 1 in)
- Turned pro: 2007
- Retired: January 2024
- Plays: Right-handed (two-handed backhand)
- Coach: Davide Sanguinetti
- Prize money: US $4,814,670
- Official website: ryanharrisontennis.com

Singles
- Career record: 118–159
- Career titles: 1
- Highest ranking: No. 40 (July 17, 2017)

Grand Slam singles results
- Australian Open: 3R (2018)
- French Open: 2R (2013)
- Wimbledon: 2R (2011, 2012, 2017, 2018)
- US Open: 3R (2016)

Other tournaments
- Olympic Games: 1R (2012)

Doubles
- Career record: 92–83
- Career titles: 4
- Highest ranking: No. 16 (November 20, 2017)

Grand Slam doubles results
- Australian Open: SF (2019)
- French Open: W (2017)
- Wimbledon: QF (2017)
- US Open: QF (2012)

Other doubles tournaments
- Tour Finals: SF (2017)

Grand Slam mixed doubles results
- US Open: 1R (2019, 2023)

Team competitions
- Davis Cup: SF (2012, 2018)

Ryan Harrison (born May 7, 1992) is an American former professional tennis player. He achieved a career-high ATP singles ranking of world No. 40 on July 17, 2017 and a best doubles of No. 16, reached on November 20, 2017.

Harrison has won five ATP Tour titles combined, one in singles at the 2017 Memphis Open and four in doubles. He is a major doubles champion at the 2017 French Open, with Michael Venus.

Before turning 16, Harrison was regarded as a prodigy after cracking the top 10 in the junior rankings and becoming one of the youngest players ever to win an ATP match. He then fell out of the top 100 for several years.

== Personal life ==
Harrison began playing tennis at age 2 and was coached by his father, Pat Harrison, who had a brief career as a professional, playing predominantly Challenger and Futures events. Harrison is an alumnus of IMG Academy and was coached by the USTA.

Harrison has a younger brother Christian, who currently plays tennis on the ATP Challenger Tour. Christian joined Ryan to play doubles at the 2012 US Open, where they reached the quarterfinals. He also has a younger sister named Madison who played at Mississippi State University. On March 5, 2016, Ryan Harrison announced his engagement to Lauren McHale, the sister of fellow tennis player Christina McHale. Harrison married Lauren McHale in April of the following year in Austin, Texas. The couple has since divorced.

== Junior career ==
As a junior, Harrison compiled a 60–24 win–loss record in singles, reaching as high as No. 7 in the world (achieved in April 2008).

Junior Slam results:

- Australian Open: SF (2008)
- French Open: 3R (2008)
- Wimbledon: 2R (2008)
- US Open: 3R (2008)

Before he went on the junior circuit, Harrison trained at the John Newcombe Tennis Ranch in New Braunfels, Texas. His first junior major was the 2007 US Open, where as a wildcard, at the age of 15, he lost in the first round to a qualifier.

Going into the next major jr., at the 2008 Australian Open, Harrison was the fourth seed. He had good victories before losing to Yang Tsung-hua in the semifinals. He failed to produce similar results in the next three majors: He fell short in the second round in 2008 Wimbledon, and the third rounds at the 2008 French Open and 2008 US Open. His younger brother, Christian, also competed in New York. Despite being 16 and still eligible to compete on the junior circuit, next season Harrison started on the professional Tour.

== Career ==
=== 2007–2008: Early years ===
Harrison is notable for being the third-youngest player since 1990, after Richard Gasquet and Rafael Nadal, to have won an ATP level match, defeating world no. 130 Pablo Cuevas in the 2008 U.S. Men's Clay Court Championships. Entering the tournament as a qualifier ranked no. 1000, he was only the tenth player in the history of the ATP Tour to have won a match before turning 16. This puts Harrison among an elite group and makes him the youngest American to accomplish this feat since Michael Chang. Harrison played mainly futures tournaments in order to increase his ranking. Harrison competed in the qualifying tournament for the 2008 Cincinnati Masters, and the 2008 US Open, but lost in the first round in both. Harrison would finish 2008 ranked no. 742 in singles.

=== 2009 ===
Harrison did not compete in any tournaments until late April in 2009. As a wildcard, he made it to the quarterfinals of a Challenger tournament in Sarasota. In June, Harrison would win his first futures title, defeating another rising star Filip Krajinović in the final. Having not defended the points from the Clay Court Championships, these points took Harrison's ranking to 706. Harrison would again try his luck in both the Cincinnati and US Open qualifying, and once again lost in the first round in both. After this, Harrison went to two consecutive Futures finals, losing the first to Michael McClune, and winning the second against Richard Bloomfield. This would put Harrison's ranking at 371 in the world. Directly after that final, Harrison made it to the semifinals of a Challenger tournament in Sacramento, losing to Jesse Levine. Harrison finished the year ranked no. 364.

=== 2010 ===
Harrison played in a playoff against other Americans to decide who would receive America's wildcard into the 2010 Australian Open. Harrison defeated Alex Kuznetsov and Donald Young in two sets before defeating Jesse Levine in three straight sets. Once in the draw, Harrison lost in the first round to Janko Tipsarević in straight sets.

At this point, Harrison began competing in some bigger tournaments. First he received a wildcard into the 2010 SAP Open, where he lost to eventual semifinalist Denis Istomin in the first round. Next, Harrison went through qualifying to face John Isner in the first round of the 2010 Regions Morgan Keegan Championships. Harrison lost in straight sets to the eventual finalist. Afterwards, Harrison went through qualifying in the 2010 Delray Beach International Tennis Championships, then lost to eventual champion Ernests Gulbis in the first round.

Harrison received a wildcard for the 2010 BNP Paribas Open, where he defeated Taylor Dent in the first round, before losing to the eventual winner Ivan Ljubičić. Having lost early, Harrison competed in the BMW Tennis Championship, where he lost in the first round. After receiving another wildcard into the 2010 Sony Ericsson Open, he lost in the first round to Michaël Llodra. Harrison played in a few Challengers afterwards without any major results.

In May, now ranked no. 263 in the world, Harrison entered the qualifying tournament for the 2010 French Open, after having lost in the final of the US Wildcard Playoff to Ryan Sweeting. Harrison lost in the final round of qualifying to Stefano Galvani. Harrison competed in the prestigious Queen's Championship, but lost in the first round to Jesse Levine. Next, Harrison competed in Wimbledon qualifying, but lost in the first round to up-and-coming Lithuanian Ričardas Berankis. Having not gained any points on his favorite surface, Harrison decided to compete in the 2010 Hall of Fame Tennis Championships. He defeated sixth seed Karol Beck, before defeating seventeen-year-old Denis Kudla. He then lost to Richard Bloomfield of Great Britain.

Harrison qualified for the US Open and defeated the 15th seed Ivan Ljubičić in the first round for his first win in a Grand Slam tournament. In the second round, Harrison fell to Sergey Stakhovsky in a grueling 5-setter, after failing to convert three match points when up 6–3 in the fifth set tiebreak.

He opted to stay in the U.S. instead of heading to Asia and trying to qualify into main tour events. He had a relatively successful fall on the Challenger tour, making the final in Tiburon, the quarterfinals in Calabasas, the second round in Charlottesville, and the second round in Bratislava where he defeated ATP no. 93 Dustin Brown.

=== 2011: Top 100 debut ===
Harrison lost to Adrian Mannarino in straight sets in the first round of the 2011 Australian Open.

Harrison won the 2011 Honolulu Challenger, beating Alex Kuznetsov in the final. He won the doubles title as well. He ousted 22nd-seeded Guillermo García López in the second round of the 2011 BNP Paribas Open at Indian Wells, California, as a wild card. In the third round, he defeated Canadian up-and-comer Milos Raonic in a tight three-setter to set up a fourth-round confrontation with world no. 3 Roger Federer, which Harrison lost.

At the 2011 French Open, Robin Söderling (seeded fifth) beat Harrison, but the young American was able to take a set off the two-time French Open finalist. His next tournament was Queen's in London, where he was given a wild card. However, he lost in the first round to Michael Berrer in three close sets, 6–7, 6–2, 5–7. He then competed in the qualifying competition for Wimbledon, in which he reached the final round but lost in five sets to Cedrik-Marcel Stebe. He received a spot in the main Wimbledon draw as a lucky loser. He beat Ivan Dodig in the first round. He faced seventh seed David Ferrer in the second round, losing in a five-set match that lasted two days.

With partner Matthew Ebden, he won the doubles tournament at the 2011 Campbell's Hall of Fame Tennis Championships in July. Harrison made his first ATP semifinal in Atlanta, where he lost to eventual champion Mardy Fish. This performance shot him into the top 100 for the first time, at no. 94. He followed this by another semifinal appearance in Los Angeles just the week after where Fish once again stopped him in three sets. As a result, his ranking jumped to world no. 82. His next tournament was Washington, D.C., where he lost to Viktor Troicki in the second round. He was also granted a wildcard to participate in the Cincinnati Masters. He lost to Novak Djokovic (no. 1 in the world) in the second round. By year's end, he had scored wins over Victor Hănescu and Troicki, and he had risen to no. 79 in the world rankings.

=== 2012 ===
During the Australian summer, Harrison lost in the first and second rounds of Brisbane and Auckland, respectively. At the Australian Open, he lost in the first round to world no. 4 Andy Murray, after taking the first set.

In February, Harrison made his third appearance in the semifinals in San Jose, where he lost to eventual winner Milos Raonic.

In April, Harrison lost his inaugural Davis Cup matches to France's Jo Wilfried Tsonga and Gilles Simon. Despite Harrison's two losses, the U.S. still advanced to the semifinals, where the team faced Spain in September 2012 and lost.

Harrison played for the Philadelphia Freedoms of World Team Tennis in the summer as their 2012 wild-card player. It was his first season playing for WTT. Harrison played with the Freedoms in their home matches on July 11 and 14 at The Pavilion at Villanova University, and traveled with the team to face the New York Sportimes on July 13.

Harrison lost to Novak Djokovic in straight sets in the second round of the 2012 Wimbledon Championships.

Harrison participated in singles at the 2012 Summer Olympics. He lost in the first round to Santiago Giraldo of Colombia. An article in The New York Times made more note of his behavior than his tennis, reporting: "Though the match was considered winnable for Harrison, the loss itself will be less remembered than Harrison's petulant behavior as the match slipped away."

=== 2013 ===
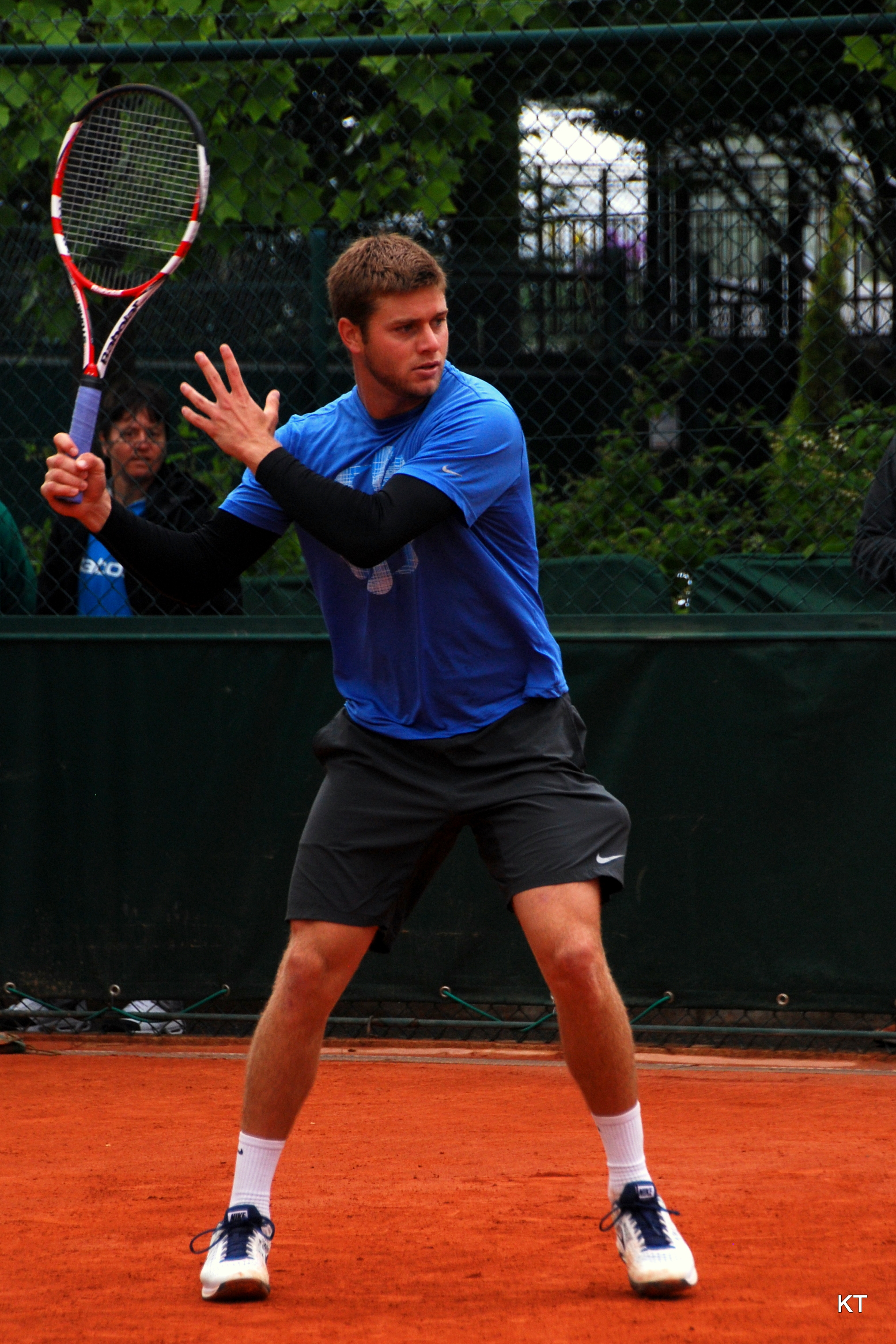
Ryan Harrison practicing at the French Open

Harrison started off the year strong with a victory over John Isner at the Apia International Sydney. At the Australian Open he beat Santiago Giraldo before only winning six games against Novak Djokovic. Harrison won his first match at the French Open against Andrey Kuznetsov. Harrison reached the semifinals of the BB&T Atlanta Open, where he lost at the hands of Kevin Anderson.

=== 2014 ===
Harrison had a frustrating year in 2014. After qualifying in Brisbane and Sydney, he exited in the first round of both tournaments at the hands of Sam Groth and Nicolas Mahut, respectively. He entered the main draw directly at the Australian Open, but again went down in the first round, this time to Gaël Monfils.

He then played a couple of Challenger events, but failed to advance beyond the second round even there. In Memphis and Delray Beach, he made it to the second round with victories over Björn Phau and Yen-Hsun Lu, but then lost to Alex Bogomolov Jr. and Marin Čilić.

Harrison made the second round in Indian Wells and Miami with victories over Andrey Golubev and Federico Delbonis and reached the quarterfinals of a Challenger event in March, as well. However, he failed to qualify in Madrid and the French Open.

He did not qualify at the Queen's Club, but he did qualify at Wimbledon, only to make another first-round exit at the hands of Grigor Dimitrov. He then went down in the first round in Newport, Rhode Island and Atlanta at the hands of eventual champion Lleyton Hewitt in Newport and fellow American Tim Smyczek in Atlanta. Consequently, Harrison's ranking plummeted to no. 190.

=== 2015 ===
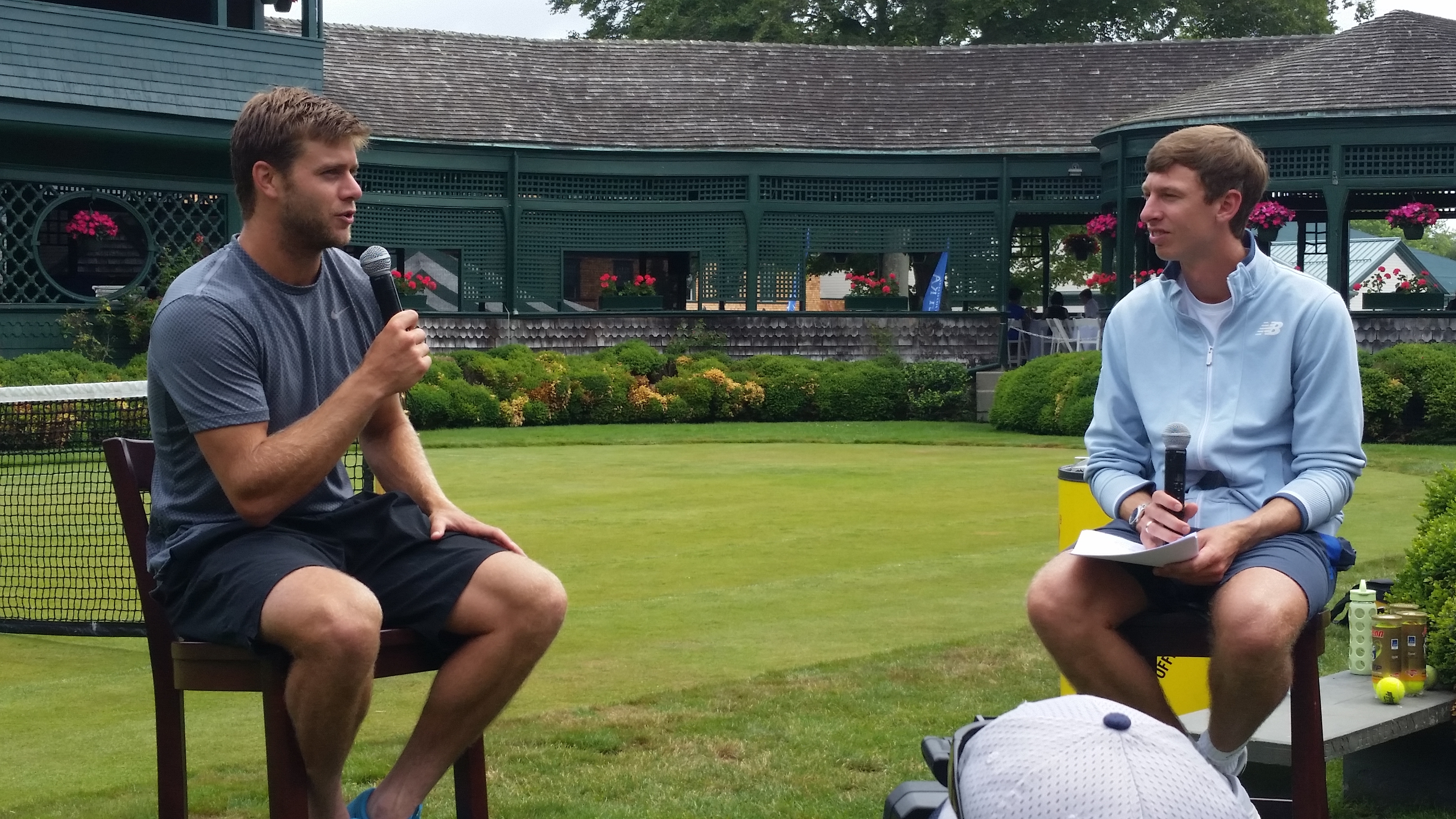
Ryan Harrison interviewed at the Hall of Fame Tennis Championships

Harrison won the Happy Valley Challenger after defeating Marcos Baghdatis in the final. At the 2015 Abierto Mexicano Telcel, he received a spot in qualifying as an alternative. He defeated Adrián Menéndez Maceiras in straight sets, before qualifying to beat countryman Michael Russell in straight sets. In the first round, Harrison defeated another countryman Donald Young, after Young retired in the third set. In the second round, Harrison scored a huge upset as he took down his first top-ten opponent Grigor Dimitrov. Harrison continued his run as he defeated Croatian Ivo Karlović in the quarterfinals. Harrison eventually lost to Spaniard David Ferrer in three sets in the semifinals. Harrison scored 200 ATP points in Acapulco, which rocketed his ranking up from 169 to 109. At the 2015 Cincinnati Masters, he lost to Thanasi Kokkinakis in the qualifying round.

=== 2016: Resurgence ===
Harrison began his resurgence in the summer by reaching the round of 16 in both the Citi Open, an ATP 500 event, and the Rogers Cup in Toronto, an ATP 1000 Masters event. At the US Open, he achieved the biggest win of his career by knocking off 5th-seeded Milos Raonic to reach the 3rd round of a grand slam for the first time ever. With this run, he returned to the Top 100 for the first time in several years.

Playing for the San Diego Aviators, Harrison was named 2016 World TeamTennis Male Most Valuable Player. He led the league in winning percentage in men's singles and was also second in men's doubles behind teammate Raven Klaasen. The 2016 Aviators won the King Trophy as WTT champions.

=== 2017: First ATP title, French Open doubles title, top 40 debut ===
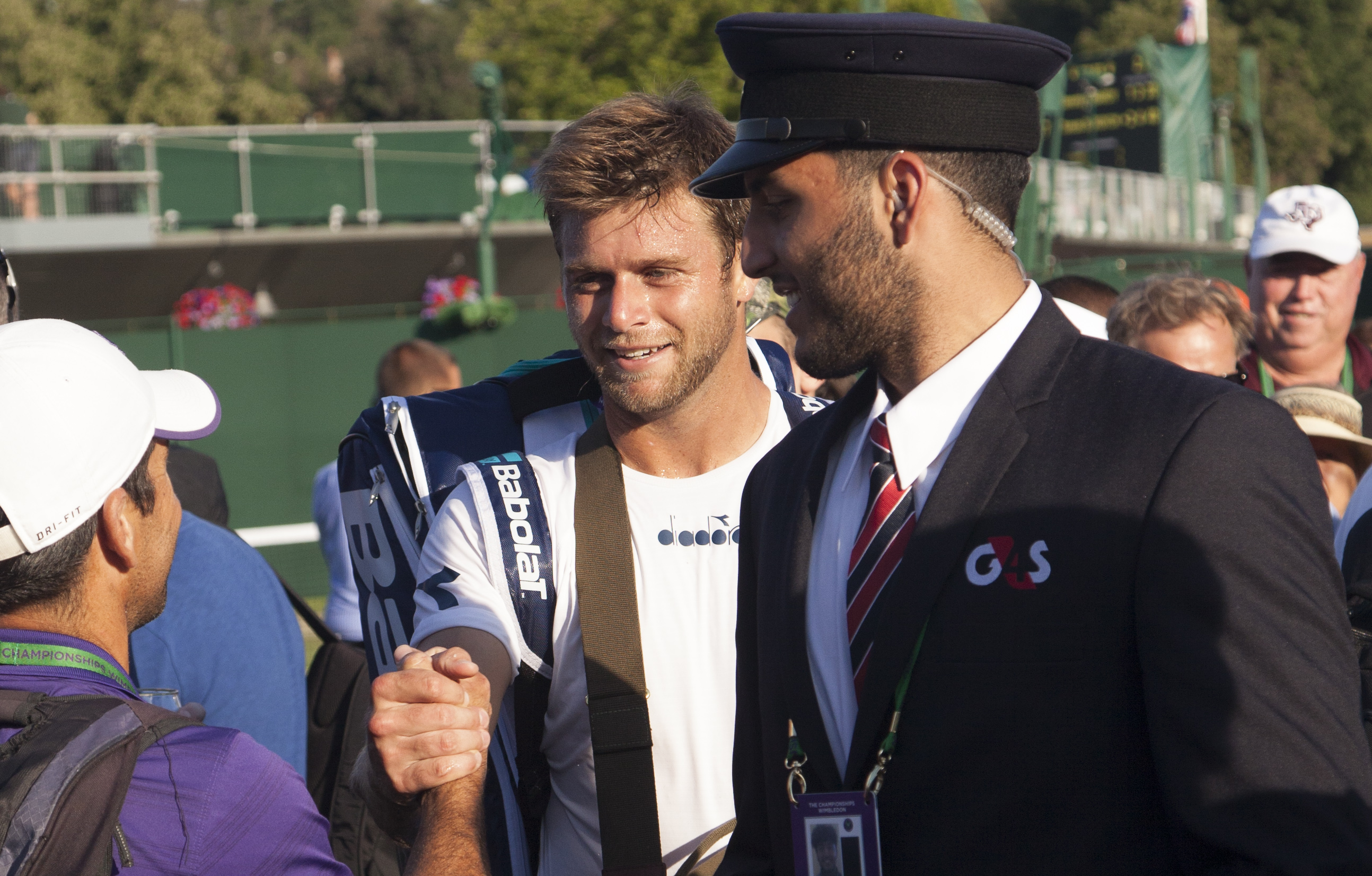
Ryan Harrison congratulated after Wimbledon win

Harrison won his first match at the Australian Open over Frenchman Nicolas Mahut 6–3, 6–4, 6–2, marking the first time he made the second round at the tournament since 2013. He then fell in straight sets to Tomáš Berdych.

Harrison reached the final of the RBC Tennis Championships of Dallas and defeated Taylor Fritz in straight sets, winning his fourth Challenger title. In his next tournament, Harrison followed up on that success by reaching both the singles and doubles finals at the Memphis Open. This was his first singles final, having lost in the semifinals on seven previous occasions. Although he would lose the doubles final with Steve Johnson, Harrison defeated Nikoloz Basilashvili in the singles final to win his first career title. Between his back-to-back titles at the RBC Tennis Championships of Dallas and the Memphis Open, he did not drop a set at either tournament.

At the French Open, Harrison teamed with Michael Venus to win the men's doubles title.

Harrison reached a career-high ranking of No. 40 on 17 July 2017. Two weeks later he made his second final of 2017 at the 2017 Atlanta Open, losing to John Isner.

=== 2018: Two ATP singles and one doubles finals ===
Harrison started 2018 by making the final of the 2018 Brisbane International before losing to Nick Kyrgios 6–4, 6–2. He also made the final in 2018 BB&T Atlanta Open losing to John Isner. At the same tournament he reached the doubles final partnering Rajeev Ram.

During competition in the 2018 New York Open, Harrison was charged by competitor Donald Young with making racist comments during their match. After an investigation, the ATP found no evidence that racist comments had been made.

=== 2020–2021: Return to tour, first ATP win since 2019 and doubles final ===
He made his return to the tour at the 2020 Delray Beach Open as a wildcard, after being out due to surgery, and won his first match since April 2019 in Houston, defeating Damir Džumhur.

In 2021, he reached the doubles final, also as a wildcard, in Delray Beach, partnering his brother Christian Harrison.

=== 2024: Retirement ===
In January 2024, Harrison announced that he would retire from professional tennis due to health issues.

== World TeamTennis ==
Harrison has played three seasons with World TeamTennis, making his debut in 2016 with the San Diego Aviators. He was named the 2016 WTT Male MVP, after recording the highest Men's singles winning percentage (.608), and the second highest winning percentage in Men's doubles (.586). He has since played another two seasons for the Aviators (2017–2018). It was announced he will be joining the San Diego Aviators during the 2020 WTT season set to begin July 12.

== Playing style ==
Harrison relies on an explosive serve and a counterpunching game from the baseline. He is also known for a strong forehand and for having a strong second serve, both in pace and kick.

== Significant finals ==
=== Grand Slam finals ===
==== Doubles: 1 (1 title) ====
Outcome	Year	Championship	Surface	Partner	Opponent	Score
Winner	2017	French Open	Clay	(New Zealand) Michael Venus	(Mexico) Santiago González (United States) Donald Young	7–6^{(7–5)}, 6–7^{(4–7)}, 6–3

== ATP career finals ==
=== Singles: 4 (1 title, 3 runners-up) ===
Legend Grand Slam tournaments (0–0) ATP World Tour Finals (0–0) ATP World Tour Masters 1000 (0–0) ATP World Tour 500 Series (0–0) ATP World Tour 250 Series (1–3)	Titles by surface Hard (1–3) Clay (0–0) Grass (0–0)	Titles by setting Outdoor (0–3) Indoor (1–0)

Result	W–L	Date	Tournament	Tier	Surface	Opponent	Score
Win	1–0	Feb 2017	Memphis Open, United States	250 Series	Hard (i)	(Georgia (country)) Nikoloz Basilashvili	6–1, 6–4
Loss	1–1	Jul 2017	Atlanta Open, United States	250 Series	Hard	(United States) John Isner	6–7^{(6–8)}, 6–7^{(7–9)}
Loss	1–2	Jan 2018	Brisbane International, Australia	250 Series	Hard	(Australia) Nick Kyrgios	4–6, 2–6
Loss	1–3	Jul 2018	Atlanta Open, United States	250 Series	Hard	(United States) John Isner	7–5, 3–6, 4–6

=== Doubles: 7 (4 titles, 3 runner-ups) ===
Legend Grand Slam tournaments (1–0) ATP World Tour Finals (0–0) ATP World Tour Masters 1000 (0–0) ATP World Tour 500 Series (0–0) ATP World Tour 250 Series (3–3)	Titles by surface Hard (1–3) Clay (2–0) Grass (1–0)	Titles by setting Outdoor (4–2) Indoor (0–1)

Result	W–L	Date	Tournament	Tier	Surface	Partner	Opponents	Score
Win	1–0	Jul 2011	Hall of Fame Championships, United States	250 Series	Grass	(Australia) Matthew Ebden	(Sweden) Johan Brunström (Canada) Adil Shamasdin	4–6, 6–3, [10–5]
Win	2–0	Jul 2012	Atlanta Open, United States	250 Series	Hard	(Australia) Matthew Ebden	(Belgium) Xavier Malisse (United States) Michael Russell	6–3, 3–6, [10–6]
Loss	2–1	Feb 2017	Memphis Open, United States	250 Series	Hard (i)	(United States) Steve Johnson	(United States) Brian Baker (Croatia) Nikola Mektić	3–6, 4–6
Win	3–1	May 2017	Estoril Open, Portugal	250 Series	Clay	(New Zealand) Michael Venus	(Spain) David Marrero (Spain) Tommy Robredo	7–5, 6–2
Win	4–1	Jun 2017	French Open, France	Grand Slam	Clay	(New Zealand) Michael Venus	(Mexico) Santiago González (United States) Donald Young	7–6^{(7–5)}, 6–7^{(4–7)}, 6–3
Loss	4–2	Jul 2018	Atlanta Open, United States	250 Series	Hard	(United States) Rajeev Ram	(United States) Nicholas Monroe (Australia) John-Patrick Smith	6–3, 6–7^{(5–7)}, [8–10]
Loss	4–3	Jan 2021	Delray Beach Open, United States	250 Series	Hard	(United States) Christian Harrison	(Uruguay) Ariel Behar (Ecuador) Gonzalo Escobar	7–6^{(7–5)}, 6–7^{(4–7)}, [4–10]

== Performance timelines ==
Key
W	F	SF	QF	#R	RR	Q#	P#	DNQ	A	Z#	PO	G	S	B	NMS	NTI	P	NH

(W) winner; (F) finalist; (SF) semifinalist; (QF) quarterfinalist; (#R) rounds 4, 3, 2, 1; (RR) round-robin stage; (Q#) qualification round; (P#) preliminary round; (DNQ) did not qualify; (A) absent; (Z#) Davis/Fed Cup Zonal Group (with number indication) or (PO) play-off; (G) gold, (S) silver or (B) bronze Olympic/Paralympic medal; (NMS) not a Masters tournament; (NTI) not a Tier I tournament; (P) postponed; (NH) not held; (SR) strike rate (events won / competed); (W–L) win–loss record.
To avoid confusion and double counting, these charts are updated at the conclusion of a tournament or when the player's participation has ended.

=== Singles ===
Current through the 2021 Delray Beach Open.

Tournament	2008	2009	2010	2011	2012	2013	2014	2015	2016	2017	2018	2019	2020	2021	SR	W–L	Win %
Grand Slam tournaments
Australian Open	A	A	1R	1R	1R	2R	1R	Q1	1R	2R	3R	2R	A	A	0 / 9	5–9	36%
French Open	A	A	Q3	1R	1R	2R	Q2	A	Q2	1R	1R	Q1	A	A	0 / 5	1–5	17%
Wimbledon	A	A	Q1	2R	2R	1R	1R	Q1	Q1	2R	2R	A	NH	A	0 / 6	4–6	40%
US Open	Q1	Q1	2R	1R	2R	1R	1R	1R	3R	1R	1R	Q1	A	A	0 / 9	4–9	31%
Win–loss	0–0	0–0	1–2	1–4	2–4	2–4	0–3	0–1	2–2	2–4	3–4	1–1	0–0	0–0	0 / 29	14–29	33%
National representation
Davis Cup	A	A	A	A	SF	A	A	A	A	A	SF	A	A	A	0 / 2	2–2	50%
ATP Tour Masters 1000
Indian Wells Masters	A	A	2R	4R	4R	2R	2R	2R	2R	1R	1R	1R	NH	A	0 / 10	11–10	52%
Miami Masters	Q1	A	1R	1R	2R	1R	2R	1R	Q1	1R	1R	Q1	NH	A	0 / 8	2–8	20%
Monte Carlo Masters	A	A	A	A	A	A	A	A	A	1R	A	A	NH	A	0 / 1	0–1	0%
Madrid Masters	A	A	A	A	2R	A	Q2	A	A	2R	2R	A	NH	A	0 / 3	3–3	50%
Rome Masters	A	A	A	A	Q1	A	A	A	A	2R	2R	A	A	A	0 / 2	2–2	50%
Canada Masters	A	A	A	A	A	A	A	Q1	3R	2R	2R	A	NH	A	0 / 3	4–3	57%
Cincinnati Masters	Q1	Q1	A	2R	1R	2R	A	Q1	Q1	1R	Q1	A	A	A	0 / 4	2–4	33%
Shanghai Masters	A	A	A	2R	1R	Q2	A	A	Q2	2R	A	A	NH		0 / 3	2–3	40%
Paris Masters	A	A	A	A	A	A	A	A	Q2	1R	A	A	A	A	0 / 1	0–1	0%
Win–loss	0–0	0–0	1–2	5–4	5–5	2–3	2–2	1–2	3–2	4–9	3–5	0–1	0–0	0–0	0 / 35	26–35	43%
Career statistics
	2008	2009	2010	2011	2012	2013	2014	2015	2016	2017	2018	2019	2020	2021	Career		
Tournaments	1	0	9	19	21	21	13	8	11	24	21	7	1	1	157		
Titles	0	0	0	0	0	0	0	0	0	1	0	0	0	0	1		
Finals	0	0	0	0	0	0	0	0	0	2	2	0	0	0	4		
Overall win–loss	1–1	0–0	4–9	14–19	23–24	11–21	5–13	5–8	11–11	19–23	21–21	3–7	1–1	0–1	1 / 157	118–159	43%
Win %	50%	–	31%	42%	49%	34%	28%	38%	50%	45%	50%	30%	50%	0%	42.6%		
Year-end ranking	748	360	173	79	69	100	191	112	90	47	62	302	479	451	$4,796,965		

=== Doubles ===
Tournament	2008	2009	2010	2011	2012	2013	2014	2015	2016	2017	2018	2019	2020	2021	SR	W–L	Win %
Grand Slam tournaments
Australian Open	A	A	A	A	1R	1R	1R	A	A	A	1R	SF	A	A	0 / 5	4–5	44%
French Open	A	A	A	A	QF	A	A	A	A	W	1R	A	A	A	1 / 3	9–2	82%
Wimbledon	A	A	A	1R	1R	A	1R	A	A	QF	1R	A	NH	A	0 / 5	3–5	37%
US Open	1R	2R	2R	A	QF	2R	A	A	1R	1R	3R	1R	2R	A	0 / 10	9–10	47%
Win–loss	0–1	1–1	1–1	0–1	6–4	1–2	0–2	0–0	0–1	9–2	2–4	4–2	1–1	0–0	1 / 23	25–22	53%
Year-end championships
ATP Finals	Did not qualify									SF	DNQ				0 / 1	3–1	75%
National representation
Davis Cup	A	A	A	A	SF	A	A	A	A	A	SF	A	A	A	0 / 2	3–0	100%
ATP Tour Masters 1000
Indian Wells Masters	A	A	A	1R	2R	A	A	A	A	A	1R	A	NH	A	0 / 3	1–3	25%
Miami Masters	A	A	1R	1R	1R	1R	SF	QF	A	A	1R	A	NH	A	0 / 7	5–7	42%
Rome Masters	A	A	A	A	A	A	A	A	A	A	1R	A	A	A	0 / 1	0–1	0%
Canadian Open	A	A	A	A	A	A	A	A	A	1R	A	A	A	A	0 / 1	0–1	0%
Cincinnati Masters	A	A	A	A	A	A	A	A	2R	SF	2R	A	2R	A	0 / 4	6–4	60%
Shanghai Masters	A	A	A	A	A	A	A	A	A	2R	A	A	NH		0 / 1	0–1	0%
Paris Masters	A	A	A	A	A	A	A	A	A	2R	A	A	A	A	0 / 1	1–1	50%
Win–loss	0–0	0–0	0–1	0–2	1–2	0–1	3–1	2–1	1–1	4–4	1–4	0–0	0–1	0–0	0 / 18	12–18	41%
Career statistics
	2008	2009	2010	2011	2012	2013	2014	2015	2016	2017	2018	2019	2020	2021	Career		
Titles	0	0	0	1	1	0	0	0	0	2	0	0	0	0	4		
Finals	0	0	0	1	1	0	0	0	0	3	1	0	0	1	7		
Overall win–loss	0–2	1–1	4–4	5–7	13–9	3–8	6–6	5–4	3–3	24–17	17–14	7–6	1–1	3–1	92–83		
Year-end ranking	737	422	173	157	62	368	104	203	238	16	102	93	264	331	52.57%		

== Wins over top-10 players ==
#	Player	Rank	Event	Surface	Rd	Score
2015
1.	(Bulgaria) Grigor Dimitrov	10	Acapulco, Mexico	Hard	2R	7–5, 4–6, 6–0
2016
2.	(Canada) Milos Raonic	6	US Open, New York, United States	Hard	2R	6–7^{(4–7)}, 7–5, 7–5, 6–1
