= US Open Series =

Series of tennis tournaments

- 2023 US Open Series
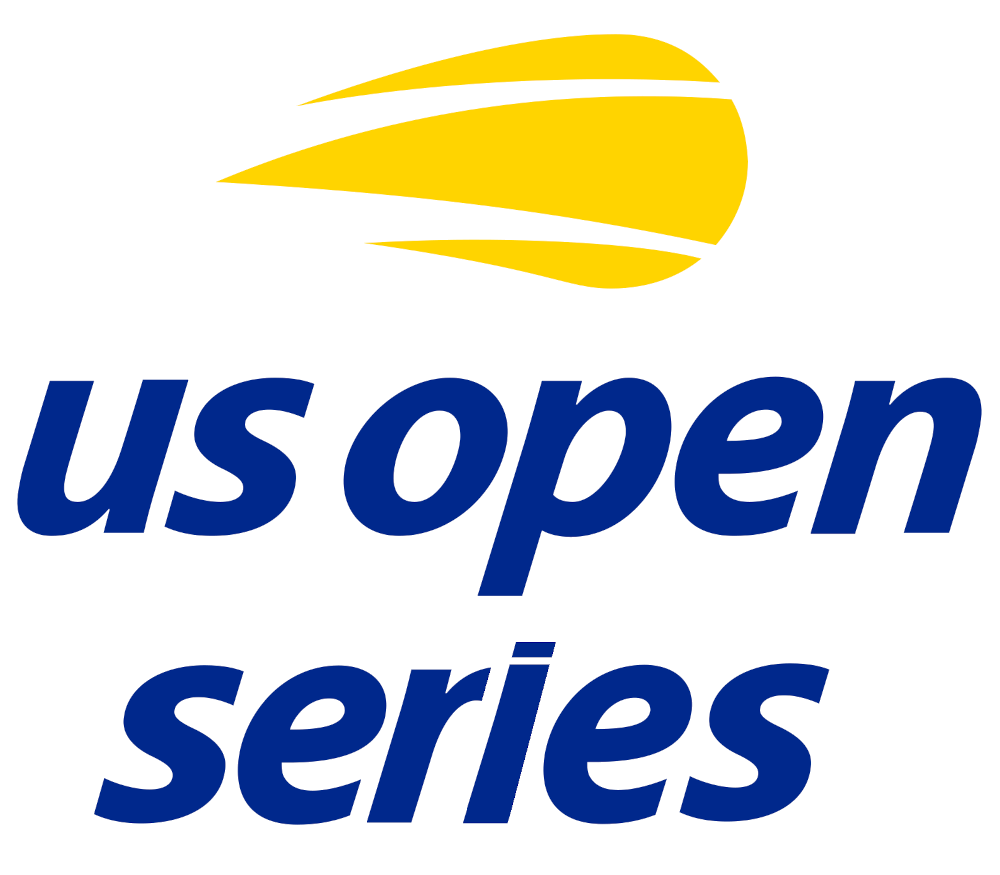

Defunct tennis tournament
- Founded: 2004
- Abolished: 2023
- Location: United States
- Surface: Hard-court
- Website: USOpenSeries.com

The US Open Series was the name given by the United States Tennis Association (USTA) to a series of North American professional tennis tournaments leading up to and including the US Open. It was part of the "North American hard-court season".

== History ==
The Series was initially organized in 2004 as a way to focus more attention on American tennis tournaments by getting more of them on domestic television. Until 2004, most summer North American tournaments were not on television, the exceptions being the prominent ATP Tour Masters 1000 events in Canada and Cincinnati. Since the inception of the series, Rafael Nadal is the only tennis player to win Canada, Cincinnati, and the US Open in a calendar year (2013), a feat referred to as the "Summer Slam" or the "North American Hardcourt Slam".

Since the Series' inception, North American tournaments have shifted in and out of the Series. In 2023, its final year, the Series was made up of six tournaments: Newport, Atlanta, Washington D.C., Winston-Salem, Cleveland, and the US Open itself. In 2024, the US Open Series website began redirecting to the US Open's official website, indicating the final end to the Series.

Under the US Open's broadcast rights, ESPN held domestic rights to all US Open Series events from 2015 to 2019. The eight non-Masters tournaments received about 50 hours of television combined – about two hours on each day of their final weekends, chiefly on ESPN2. The Washington Open, which had been a part of the series since its 2004 founding, withdrew from the series starting with its 2015 edition due to frustrations over this lack of coverage and sold its exclusive coverage to Tennis Channel. The tournament rejoined the US Open Series in 2019. Since 2017, Tennis Channel broadcasts the US Open Series, except for the US Open itself, which is broadcast by ESPN.

Emirates sponsored the series under a deal in place from 2012 to 2016. The $90 million, seven-year sponsorship deal was supposed to last through 2018, but Emirates decided to reallocate its commitment by sponsoring the line-calling technology on ESPN's US Open Series broadcasts.

== Tournaments ==
Legend
Grand Slam Event
ATP Masters 1000 and WTA 1000
ATP Tour 500 and WTA 500
ATP Tour 250 and WTA 250

| Week | Date | Men's Events | Women's Events |
|---|---|---|---|
| 1 | July 17 – July 23 | Newport; Infosys Hall of Fame Open; 2023 Champion: (France) Adrian Mannarino | No Series Event Held This Week |
| 2 | July 24 – July 30 | Atlanta; Atlanta Open; 2023 Champion: (United States) Taylor Fritz | No Series Event Held This Week |
| 3 | July 31 – August 6 | Washington D.C. Mubadala Citi DC Open; 2023 Champion: (United Kingdom) Dan Evans | Washington D.C. Mubadala Citi DC Open; 2023 Champion: (United States) Coco Gauff |
| 4 | August 20 – August 26 | Winston-Salem; Winston-Salem Open; 2023 Champion: (Argentina) Sebastian Baez | Cleveland; Tennis in the Land; 2023 Champion: (Spain) Sara Sorribes Tormo |
| 5-6 | August 28 – September 10 | New York; US Open; 2023 Champion: (Serbia) Novak Djokovic | New York; US Open; 2023 Champion: (United States) Coco Gauff |

== Past tournament winners ==
=== Men ===
| Year | Newport | Los Angeles | Indianapolis/Atlanta | Washington | Montreal/Toronto | Cincinnati | New Haven/Winston-Salem |
|---|---|---|---|---|---|---|---|
| 2004 | Not US Open Series | (Germany) Haas (1/2) | (United States) Roddick (1/5) | (Australia) Hewitt (1/2) | (Switzerland) Federer (1/9) | (United States) Agassi (1/2) | (Australia) Hewitt (2/2) |
| 2005 | Not US Open Series | (United States) Agassi (2/2) | (United States) Ginepri (1/2) | (United States) Roddick (2/5) | (Spain) Nadal (1/6) | (Switzerland) Federer (2/9) | (United States) Blake (1/3) |
| 2006 | Not US Open Series | (Germany) Haas (2/2) | (United States) Blake (2/3) | (France) Clément (1/1) | (Switzerland) Federer (3/9) | (United States) Roddick (3/5) | (Russia) Davydenko (1/1) |
| 2007 | Not US Open Series | (Czech Republic) Štěpánek (1/2) | (Russia) Tursunov (1/1) | (United States) Roddick (4/5) | (Serbia) Djokovic (1/6) | (Switzerland) Federer (4/9) | (United States) Blake (3/3) |
| 2008 | Not US Open Series | (Argentina) Del Potro (1/4) | (France) Simon (1/1) | (Argentina) Del Potro (2/4) | (Spain) Nadal (2/6) | (United Kingdom) Murray (1/5) | (Croatia) Čilić (1/2) |
| 2009 | Not US Open Series | (United States) Querrey (1/3) | (United States) Ginepri (2/2) | (Argentina) Del Potro (3/4) | (United Kingdom) Murray (2/5) | (Switzerland) Federer (5/9) | (Spain) Verdasco (1/1) |
| 2010 | Not US Open Series | (United States) Querrey (2/3) | (United States) Fish (1/2) | (Argentina) Nalbandian (1/1) | (United Kingdom) Murray (3/5) | (Switzerland) Federer (6/9) | (Ukraine) Stakhovsky (1/1) |
| 2011 | Not US Open Series | (Latvia) Gulbis (1/1) | (United States) Fish (2/2) | (Czech Republic) Štěpánek (2/2) | (Serbia) Djokovic (2/6) | (United Kingdom) Murray (4/5) | (United States) Isner (1/8) |
| 2012 | Not US Open Series | (United States) Querrey (3/3) | (United States) Roddick (5/5) | (Ukraine) Dolgopolov (1/1) | (Serbia) Djokovic (3/6) | (Switzerland) Federer (7/9) | (United States) Isner (2/8) |
| 2013 | Not US Open Series | Not held | (United States) Isner (3/8) | (Argentina) Del Potro (4/4) | (Spain) Nadal (3/6) | (Spain) Nadal (4/6) | (Austria) Melzer (1/1) |
| 2014 | Not US Open Series | Not held | (United States) Isner (4/8) | (Canada) Raonic (1/1) | (France) Tsonga (1/1) | (Switzerland) Federer (8/9) | (Czech Republic) Rosol (1/1) |
| 2015 | Not US Open Series | Not held | (United States) Isner (5/8) | Not US Open Series | (United Kingdom) Murray (5/5) | (Switzerland) Federer (9/9) | (South Africa) Anderson (1/2) |
| 2016 | Not US Open Series | Not held | (Australia) Kyrgios (1/3) | Not US Open Series | (Serbia) Djokovic (4/6) | (Croatia) Čilić (2/2) | (Spain) Carreño Busta (1/1) |
| 2017 | Not US Open Series | Not held | (United States) Isner (6/8) | Not US Open Series | (Germany) Zverev (1/2) | (Bulgaria) Dimitrov (1/1) | (Spain) Bautista Agut (1/1) |
| 2018 | Not US Open Series | Not held | (United States) Isner (7/8) | Not US Open Series | (Spain) Nadal (5/6) | (Serbia) Djokovic (5/6) | (Russia) Medvedev (1/3) |
| 2019 | Not US Open Series | Not held | (Australia) de Minaur (1/2) | (Australia) Kyrgios (2/3) | (Spain) Nadal (6/6) | (Russia) Medvedev (2/3) | (Poland) Hurkacz (1/1) |
| 2020 | Cancelled | Not held | Cancelled | Cancelled | Cancelled | (Serbia) Djokovic (6/6) | Cancelled |
| 2021 | (South Africa) Anderson (2/2) | Not held | (United States) Isner (8/8) | (Italy) Sinner (1/1) | (Russia) Medvedev (3/3) | (Germany) Zverev (2/2) | (Belarus) Ivashka (1/1) |
| 2022 | (United States) Cressy (1/1) | Not held | (Australia) de Minaur (2/2) | (Australia) Kyrgios (3/3) | Not US Open Series | (Croatia) Ćorić(1/1) | (France) Mannarino (1/2) |
| 2023 | (France) Mannarino (2/2) | Not held | (United States) Fritz (1/1) | (United Kingdom) Evans (1/1) | Not US Open Series | Not US Open Series | (Argentina) Báez (1/1) |

=== Women ===
| Year | Stanford/San José | San Diego/Carlsbad | Los Angeles/Washington | Cincinnati | Montreal/Toronto | New Haven/Cleveland |
|---|---|---|---|---|---|---|
| 2004 | (United States) Davenport (1/4) | (United States) Davenport (2/4) | (United States) Davenport (3/4) | Not US Open Series | (France) Mauresmo (1/1) | (Russia) Bovina (1/1) |
| 2005 | (Belgium) Clijsters (1/5) | (France) Pierce (1/1) | (Belgium) Clijsters (2/5) | Not US Open Series | (Belgium) Clijsters (3/5) | (United States) Davenport (4/4) |
| 2006 | (Belgium) Clijsters (4/5) | (Russia) Sharapova (1/3) | (Russia) Dementieva (1/2) | Not US Open Series | (Serbia) Ivanovic (1/2) | (Belgium) Henin (1/2) |
| 2007 | (Russia) Chakvetadze (1/1) | (Russia) Sharapova (2/3) | (Serbia) Ivanovic (2/2) | Not US Open Series | (Belgium) Henin (2/2) | (Russia) Kuznetsova (1/2) |
| 2008 | (Canada) Wozniak (1/1) | Not held | (Russia) Safina (1/2) | Not US Open Series | (Russia) Safina (2/2) | (Denmark) Wozniacki (1/5) |
| 2009 | (France) Bartoli (1/1) | Not held | (Italy) Pennetta (1/1) | (Serbia) Janković (1/1) | (Russia) Dementieva (2/2) | (Denmark) Wozniacki (2/5) |
| 2010 | (Belarus) Azarenka (1/3) | (Russia) Kuznetsova (2/2) | Not held | (Belgium) Clijsters (5/5) | (Denmark) Wozniacki (3/5) | (Denmark) Wozniacki (4/5) |
| 2011 | (United States) S. Williams (1/7) | (Poland) Radwańska (1/3) | Not held | (Russia) Sharapova (3/3) | (United States) S. Williams (2/7) | (Denmark) Wozniacki (5/5) |
| 2012 | (United States) S. Williams (3/7) | (Slovakia) Cibulková (1/2) | (Slovakia) Rybáriková (1/1) | (China) Li (1/1) | (Czech Republic) Kvitová (1/4) | (Czech Republic) Kvitová (2/4) |
| 2013 | (Slovakia) Cibulková (2/2) | (Australia) Stosur (1/1) | Not US Open Series | (Belarus) Azarenka (2/3) | (United States) S. Williams (4/7) | (Romania) Halep (1/3) |
| 2014 | (United States) S. Williams (5/7) | Not held | Not US Open Series | (United States) S. Williams (6/7) | (Poland) Radwańska (2/3) | (Czech Republic) Kvitová (3/4) |
| 2015 | (Germany) Kerber (1/1) | Not US Open Series | Not US Open Series | (United States) S. Williams (7/7) | (Switzerland) Bencic (1/1) | (Czech Republic) Kvitová (4/4) |
| 2016 | (United Kingdom) Konta (1/1) | Not held | Not US Open Series | (Czech Republic) Ka. Plíšková (1/1) | (Romania) Halep (2/3) | (Poland) Radwańska (3/3) |
| 2017 | (United States) Keys (1/2) | Not held | Not US Open Series | (Spain) Muguruza (1/1) | (Ukraine) Svitolina (1/1) | (Australia) Gavrilova (1/1) |
| 2018 | (Romania) Buzărnescu (1/1) | Not held | Not US Open Series | (Netherlands) Bertens (1/1) | (Romania) Halep (3/3) | (Belarus) Sabalenka (1/1) |
| 2019 | (China) Zheng (1/1) | Not held | Not US Open Series | (United States) Keys (2/2) | (Canada) Andreescu (1/1) | Not held |
| 2020 | Cancelled | Not held | Not US Open Series | (Belarus) Azarenka (3/3) | Cancelled | Not held |
| 2021 | (United States) Collins (1/1) | Not held | Not US Open Series | (Australia) Barty (1/1) | (Italy) Giorgi (1/1) | (Estonia) Kontaveit (1/1) |
| 2022 | Kasatkina (1/1) | Not US Open Series | Not US Open Series | (France) Garcia (1/1) | Not US Open Series | Samsonova (1/1) |
| 2023 | Not held | Not US Open Series | (United States) Gauff (1/1) | Not US Open Series | Not US Open Series | (Spain) Sorribes Tormo (1/1) |

== Bonus Challenge ==
Upon the Series' creation in 2004, the US Open Series Bonus Challenge was introduced. Each event in the series would award a certain number of points depending on the event's tier (such as Premier 5), with players accumulating points based on how they performed. At the end of the Series, the top three male and top three female players with the most Bonus Challenge points would earn prize money in addition to the prize money earned from the individual tournaments. The amount depended on their placement in the Bonus Challenge standings and their US Open result. In 2010, for example, this amounted to $1 million for winning both the Bonus Challenge and the US Open itself.

Lleyton Hewitt and Lindsay Davenport were the top point-getters in 2004, Andy Roddick and Kim Clijsters won in 2005, and Andy Roddick and Ana Ivanovic won in 2006. Defending US Open champions Roger Federer and Maria Sharapova won in 2007. In 2005, whereas Roddick was upset in the first round against Gilles Müller at the Open, Clijsters became the first player to win both the US Open Series and the US Open, receiving $2.2 million, at the time the largest payday in women's sports. Clijsters defeated Frenchwoman Mary Pierce in straight sets: 6–3, 6–1. In 2010 she won $2.2 million again, this time $1.7 million for the US Open title and $500,000 in bonus for second place in the US Open Series. In 2007, Federer became the first male player and the second player overall to win the US Open Series and go on to win the US Open, winning $1.4 million plus the US Open Series bonus of $1 million, bringing his prize winning total to $2.4 million. This topped Clijsters' $2.2 million as the biggest US Open payday to date. In 2013, Serena Williams and Rafael Nadal both won the US Open after also winning the US Open Series. Due to several considerable prize money increments over the years, Serena Williams and Rafael Nadal surpassed Roger Federer's US Open Series payday record by winning $3.6 million each, and they shared the record for the largest prize money paycheck in tennis history for a single tennis tournament. In 2014, Serena Williams would repeat her previous year performance in winning both the US Open Series and the US Open. She now stands alone in the record for the biggest payday in tennis history, with a total amount of $4 million. Starting from 2017, the US Open Series ceased featuring a Bonus Challenge.

=== Points distribution ===
==== 2008–2016 ====
| Round | ATP Masters 1000 WTA Premier 5 | ATP World Tour 500 & 250 WTA Premier |
|---|---|---|
| Winner | 100 | 70 |
| Finalist | 70 | 45 |
| Semifinalist | 45 | 25 |
| Quarterfinalist | 25 | 15 |
| Round of 16 | 15 | 0 |

==== 2006–2007 ====
| Round | ATP Masters Series WTA Tour Tier I | ATP International Series WTA Tour Tier II |
|---|---|---|
| Winner | 100 | 50 |
| Finalist | 70 | 35 |
| Semifinalist | 45 | 22 |
| Quarterfinalist | 25 | 12 |
| Round of 16 | 15 | 0 |

==== 2004–2005 ====
| Round | ATP Masters Series WTA Tour Tier I | WTA Tour Tier II | ATP International Series ($600,000 and above) | ATP International Series (below $600,000) |
|---|---|---|---|---|
| Winner | 100 | 50 | 40 | 35 |
| Finalist | 70 | 35 | 28 | 24 |
| Semifinalist | 45 | 22 | 18 | 15 |
| Quarterfinalist | 25 | 12 | 10 | 8 |
| Round of 16 | 15 | 0 | 0 | 0 |

== Series standings + performance at the US Open ==
Note: From 2006 on, only players who earned points in at least two US Open Series events are eligible for the final (Top 3) standings.

US Open results
| A | did not participate in the tournament | #R | lost in the early rounds of the tournament |
| QF | advanced to but not past the quarterfinals | SF | advanced to but not past the semifinals |
| F | advanced to the finals, tournament runner-up | W | won the tournament |

| Year | Player (ATP Tour) | Points | US Open | Player (WTA Tour) | Points | US Open |
|---|---|---|---|---|---|---|
| 2004 | 1. (Australia) Lleyton Hewitt^{1} | 155 | F | 1. (United States) Lindsay Davenport^{1} | 100 | SF |
| 2004 | 2. (United States) Andy Roddick | 155 | QF | 2. (France) Amélie Mauresmo | 100 | QF |
| 2004 | 3. (United States) Andre Agassi | 123 | QF | 3. (Russia) Elena Likhovtseva | 85 | 1R |
| 2005 | 1. (United States) Andy Roddick | 120 | 1R | 1. (Belgium) Kim Clijsters | 225 | W |
| 2005 | 2. (United States) Andre Agassi | 105 | F | 2. (France) Mary Pierce | 100 | F |
| 2005 | 3. (Spain) Rafael Nadal^{2} | 100 | 3R | 3. (France) Amélie Mauresmo | 80 | QF |
| 2006 | 1. (United States) Andy Roddick | 147 | F | 1. (Serbia) Ana Ivanovic | 127 | 3R |
| 2006 | 2. (Chile) Fernando González | 124 | 3R | 2. (Russia) Maria Sharapova | 122 | W |
| 2006 | 3. (United Kingdom) Andy Murray | 105 | 4R | 3. (Belgium) Kim Clijsters | 120 | A |
| 2007 | 1. (Switzerland) Roger Federer | 170 | W | 1. (Russia) Maria Sharapova | 122 | 3R |
| 2007 | 2. (United States) James Blake | 167 | 4R | 2. (Serbia) Jelena Janković | 107 | QF |
| 2007 | 3. (United States) Andy Roddick | 112 | QF | 3. (Switzerland) Patty Schnyder^{3} | 97 | 3R |
| 2008 | 1. (Spain) Rafael Nadal^{4} | 145 | SF | 1. (Russia) Dinara Safina | 170 | SF |
| 2008 | 2. (United Kingdom) Andy Murray | 145 | F | 2. (France) Marion Bartoli | 90 | 4R |
| 2008 | 3. (Argentina) Juan Martín del Potro | 140 | QF | 3. (Slovakia) Dominika Cibulková | 85 | 3R |
| 2009 | 1. (United States) Sam Querrey | 175 | 3R | 1. (Russia) Elena Dementieva | 170 | 2R |
| 2009 | 2. (United Kingdom) Andy Murray | 145 | 4R | 2. (Italy) Flavia Pennetta^{5} | 140 | QF |
| 2009 | 3. (Argentina) Juan Martín del Potro | 140 | W | 3. (Serbia) Jelena Janković | 140 | 2R |
| 2010 | 1. (United Kingdom) Andy Murray^{6} | 170 | 3R | 1. (Denmark) Caroline Wozniacki | 185 | SF |
| 2010 | 2. (Switzerland) Roger Federer | 170 | SF | 2. (Belgium) Kim Clijsters | 125 | W |
| 2010 | 3. (United States) Mardy Fish | 140 | 4R | 3. (Russia) Svetlana Kuznetsova^{7} | 115 | 4R |
| 2011 | 1. (United States) Mardy Fish | 230 | 4R | 1. (United States) Serena Williams | 170 | F |
| 2011 | 2. (Serbia) Novak Djokovic | 170 | W | 2. (Poland) Agnieszka Radwańska^{8} | 130 | 2R |
| 2011 | 3. (United States) John Isner | 140 | QF | 3. (Russia) Maria Sharapova | 130 | 3R |
| 2012 | 1. (Serbia) Novak Djokovic | 170 | F | 1. (Czech Republic) Petra Kvitová | 215 | 4R |
| 2012 | 2. (United States) John Isner | 140 | 3R | 2. (China) Li Na | 170 | 3R |
| 2012 | 3. (United States) Sam Querrey | 135 | 3R | 3. (Slovakia) Dominika Cibulková | 100 | 3R |
| 2013 | 1. (Spain) Rafael Nadal | 200 | W | 1. (United States) Serena Williams | 170 | W |
| 2013 | 2. (United States) John Isner | 185 | 3R | 2. (Belarus) Victoria Azarenka | 145 | F |
| 2013 | 3. (Argentina) Juan Martín del Potro | 130 | 2R | 3. (Poland) Agnieszka Radwańska | 130 | 4R |
| 2014 | 1. (Canada) Milos Raonic^{9} | 280 | 4R | 1. (United States) Serena Williams^{9} | 430 | W |
| 2014 | 2. (United States) John Isner^{9} | 200 | 3R | 2. (Germany) Angelique Kerber^{9} | 150 | 3R |
| 2014 | 3. (Switzerland) Roger Federer | 170 | SF | 3. (Poland) Agnieszka Radwańska | 125 | 2R |
| 2015 | 1. (United Kingdom) Andy Murray | 145 | 4R | 1. (Czech Republic) Karolína Plíšková^{9} | 150 | 1R |
| 2015 | 2. (Serbia) Novak Djokovic | 140 | W | 2. (United States) Serena Williams | 145 | SF |
| 2015 | 3. (United States) John Isner | 95 | 4R | 3. (Romania) Simona Halep | 140 | SF |
| 2016 | 1. (Japan) Kei Nishikori | 85 | SF | 1. (Poland) Agnieszka Radwańska^{9} | 220 | 4R |
| 2016 | 2. (Bulgaria) Grigor Dimitrov^{10} | 70 | 4R | 2. (United Kingdom) Johanna Konta^{9} | 170 | 4R |
| 2016 | 3. (Canada) Milos Raonic | 70 | 2R | 3. (Romania) Simona Halep | 145 | QF |
| 2017 | Bonus challenge no longer held | | | | | |

- 1 – Hewitt and Davenport finished first in 2004 final standings based on more match wins in US Open Series events.
- 2 – Nadal finished third in 2005 (over Roger Federer) based on more set wins in US Open Series events.
- 3 – Schnyder was placed third in 2007 because Justine Henin (who had more points – 100 for winning Toronto) only played one tournament and was therefore not eligible for the top three positions.
- 4 – Nadal won the 2008 series ahead of Murray because Nadal defeated Murray in Toronto, Canada.
- 5 – Pennetta finished second in the 2009 final standings based on more match wins in US Open Series events.
- 6 – Murray won the 2010 series ahead of Federer because Murray defeated Federer in Toronto.
- 7 – Kuznetsova finished third in 2010 (over Victoria Azarenka and Maria Sharapova) based on more games won in US Open Series events (all three won 9 matches and 19 sets).
- 8 – Radwańska finished second in the 2011 final standings based on more match wins in US Open Series events.
- 9 – Players who had their point totals doubled due to having obtained points in at least three different events, based on a rule enforced from 2014 on.
- 10 – Dimitrov finished second in the 2016 final standings based on more match wins in US Open Series events.

== Records ==
Players who won both the US Open Series and the US Open in the same year, receiving $1 million bonus prize money
Men: Roger Federer (2007) & Rafael Nadal (2013).
Women: Kim Clijsters (2005*) & Serena Williams (2013, 2014).
* - Clijsters received the Champion's prize money, $1.1M, plus a bonus equaling the prize money, $1.1M, for a total of $2.2M.
Most points won
Without doubling bonus for three countable tournaments (until 2013):

Men: Mardy Fish, 230 points in 2011.
Women: Kim Clijsters, 225 points in 2005.

With doubling bonus for three countable tournaments (since 2014):

Men: Milos Raonic, 280 points in 2014.
Women: Serena Williams, 430 points in 2014.

Most US Open Series overall victories
Men: 2, Andy Roddick (2005, 2006); Rafael Nadal (2008, 2013); Andy Murray (2010, 2015).
Women: 3, Serena Williams (2011, 2013, 2014).
Most US Open Series Top-3 finishes
Men: 5, Andy Murray (2006, 2008, 2009, 2010, 2015) & John Isner (2011, 2012, 2013, 2014, 2015).
Women: 4, Serena Williams (2011, 2013, 2014, 2015) & Agnieszka Radwańska (2011, 2013, 2014, 2016).
Most US Open Series tournament victories
Men: 9, Roger Federer
Women: 7, Serena Williams
Biggest payout in the series (which were the largest in tennis history until Ashleigh Barty won US$4.42 at the WTA Finals in 2019)
Serena Williams (2014) – $4 million (won US Open Series and US Open).
Biggest payout in men's: Novak Djokovic (2015) – $3.8 million (US Open Series runner-up and US Open winner).
Most successful nation in the US Open Series
Overall: United States, 38 tournament victories (Men: 24 & Women: 14).

Men: United States, 24 tournament victories.
Women: United States, 14 tournament victories.
