= 2023 US Open Series =

In tennis, the 2023 US Open Series was the twentieth and final edition of the US Open Series, which comprised a group of hard court tournaments that started on July 17, 2023, in Newport.

== Tournament schedule ==
Legend
Grand Slam Event
ATP Masters 1000 and WTA 1000
ATP Tour 500 and WTA 500
ATP Tour 250 and WTA 250

Week	Date	Men's Events	Women's Events
1	July 17 – July 23	Newport; Infosys Hall of Fame Open; 2023 Champion: (France) Adrian Mannarino	No Series Event Held This Week
2	July 24 – July 30	Atlanta; Atlanta Open; 2023 Champion: (United States) Taylor Fritz	No Series Event Held This Week
3	July 31 – August 6	Washington D.C. Mubadala Citi DC Open; 2023 Champion: (United Kingdom) Dan Evans	Washington D.C. Mubadala Citi DC Open; 2023 Champion: (United States) Coco Gauff
4	August 20 – August 26	Winston-Salem; Winston-Salem Open; 2023 Champion: (Argentina) Sebastian Baez	Cleveland; Tennis in the Land; 2023 Champion: (Spain) Sara Sorribes Tormo
5-6	August 28 – September 10	New York; US Open; 2023 Champion: (Serbia) Novak Djokovic	New York; US Open; 2023 Champion: (United States) Coco Gauff

== Week 1 ==
=== Infosys Hall of Fame Open ===
Semifinals
(United States) John Isner	6^{6}	4
(United States) Alex Michelsen	7^{8}	6
3	(France) Ugo Humbert	4	3
2	(France) Adrian Mannarino	6	6

Final
(United States) Alex Michelsen	2	4
2	(France) Adrian Mannarino	6	6

== Week 2 ==
=== Atlanta Open ===
Semifinals
1	(United States) Taylor Fritz	6	7
8	(United States) J. J. Wolf	3	5
(Australia) Aleksandar Vukic	3	7^{7}	7
7	(France) Ugo Humbert	6	6^{2}	5

Final
1	(United States) Taylor Fritz	7	6^{5}	6
(Australia) Aleksandar Vukic	5	7^{7}	4

== Week 3 ==
=== Mubadala Citi DC Open ===
Quarterfinals
1	(United States) Taylor Fritz	6	6
(Australia) Jordan Thompson	3	3
16	(United States) J. J. Wolf	5	4
12	(Netherlands) Tallon Griekspoor	7	6
5	(Bulgaria) Grigor Dimitrov	w/o
13	(France) Ugo Humbert
9	(United Kingdom) Dan Evans	6	7
2	(United States) Frances Tiafoe	4	5

Semifinals
1	(United States) Taylor Fritz	6	3	2
12	(Netherlands) Tallon Griekspoor	3	6	6
5	(Bulgaria) Grigor Dimitrov	3	6^{4}
9	(United Kingdom) Dan Evans	6	7^{7}

Final
12	(Netherlands) Tallon Griekspoor	5	3
9	(United Kingdom) Dan Evans	7	6

=== Mubadala Citi DC Open ===
Semifinals
1	(United States) Jessica Pegula	3	6	2
4	(Greece) Maria Sakkari	6	4	6
3	(United States) Coco Gauff	6	6
8	Liudmila Samsonova	3	3

Final
4	(Greece) Maria Sakkari	2	3
3	(United States) Coco Gauff	6	6

== Week 4 ==
=== Winston-Salem Open ===
Quarterfinals
1	(Croatia) Borna Ćorić	6	6
Alt	(Argentina) Juan Manuel Cerúndolo	3	1
4	(Serbia) Laslo Djere	3	0
6	(Argentina) Sebastián Báez	6	6
12	(France) Richard Gasquet	6	1	6^{7}
3/WC	(United States) Sebastian Korda	4	6	7^{9}
5	(Czech Republic) Jiří Lehečka	7^{7}	6
(Australia) Max Purcell	6^{4}	4

Semifinals
1	(Croatia) Borna Ćorić	3	7^{7}	6^{2}
6	(Argentina) Sebastián Báez	6	6^{4}	7^{7}
3/WC	(United States) Sebastian Korda
5	(Czech Republic) Jiří Lehečka	w/o

Final
6	(Argentina) Sebastián Báez	6	6
5	(Czech Republic) Jiří Lehečka	4	3

=== Tennis in the Land ===
Semifinals
(China) Zhu Lin	5	2
4	Ekaterina Alexandrova	7	6
LL	(Spain) Sara Sorribes Tormo	6	6
(Germany) Tatjana Maria	4	3

Final
4	Ekaterina Alexandrova	6	4	4
LL	(Spain) Sara Sorribes Tormo	3	6	6

== Weeks 5 & 6 ==
=== US Open ===
Quarterfinals
1	(Spain) Carlos Alcaraz	6	6	6
12	(Germany) Alexander Zverev	3	2	4
3	Daniil Medvedev	6	6	6
8	Andrey Rublev	4	3	4
10	(United States) Frances Tiafoe	2	6	6^{7}	2
(United States) Ben Shelton	6	3	7^{9}	6
9	(United States) Taylor Fritz	1	4	4
2	(Serbia) Novak Djokovic	6	6	6

Semifinals
1	(Spain) Carlos Alcaraz	6^{3}	1	6	3
3	Daniil Medvedev	7^{7}	6	3	6
(United States) Ben Shelton	3	2	6^{4}
2	(Serbia) Novak Djokovic	6	6	7^{7}

Final
3	Daniil Medvedev	3	6^{5}	3
2	(Serbia) Novak Djokovic	6	7^{7}	6

Quarterfinals
20	(Latvia) Jeļena Ostapenko	0	2
6	(United States) Coco Gauff	6	6
30	(Romania) Sorana Cîrstea	0	3
10	(Czech Republic) Karolína Muchová	6	6
9	(Czech Republic) Markéta Vondroušová	1	4
17	(United States) Madison Keys	6	6
23	(China) Zheng Qinwen	1	4
2	Aryna Sabalenka	6	6

Semifinals
6	(United States) Coco Gauff	6	7
10	(Czech Republic) Karolína Muchová	4	5
17	(United States) Madison Keys	6	6^{1}	6^{5}
2	Aryna Sabalenka	0	7^{7}	7^{10}

Final
6	(United States) Coco Gauff	2	6	6
2	Aryna Sabalenka	6	3	2
