= 2021 Citi Open =

Sports tournament

- Date: July 31 – August 8
- Edition: 52nd
- Category: ATP Tour 500
- Draw: 48S / 16D
- Surface: Hard (outdoor); SportMaster Sport Surfaces
- Location: Washington, D.C., United States
- Venue: William H.G. FitzGerald Tennis Center

Champions

Singles
- (Italy) Jannik Sinner

Doubles
- (South Africa) Raven Klaasen / (Japan) Ben McLachlan
- Washington Open

The 2021 Washington Open (called the Citi Open for sponsorship reasons) was a men's tennis tournament played on outdoor hard courts. It was the 52nd edition of the Washington Open. The event was part of the ATP Tour 500 series of the 2021 ATP Tour and part of the US Open Series leading up to the US Open grand slam in September. The Washington Open took place at the William H.G. FitzGerald Tennis Center in Washington, D.C., United States, from July 31 to August 8, 2021. Fifth-seeded Jannik Sinner won the singles title.

== Finals ==
=== Singles ===
- (Italy) Jannik Sinner defeated (United States) Mackenzie McDonald 7–5, 4–6, 7–5

=== Doubles ===
- (South Africa) Raven Klaasen / (Japan) Ben McLachlan defeated (United Kingdom) Neal Skupski / (New Zealand) Michael Venus 7–6^{(7–4)}, 6–4.

== Points and prize money ==
=== Points distribution ===
Event	W	F	SF	QF	Round of 16	Round of 32	Round of 64	Q	Q2	Q1
Singles	500	300	180	90	45	20	0	10	4	0
Doubles	500	300	180	90	0	—N/a	—N/a	45	25	0

=== Prize money ===
Event	W	F	SF	QF	Round of 16	Round of 32	Round of 64	Q	Q2	Q1
Singles	€350,755	€178,500	€91,500	€48,000	€24,400	€13,300	€7,520	—N/a	€3,685	1,970
Doubles*	€118,700	€60,000	€30,500	€15,970	€8,250	—N/a	—N/a	—N/a	—N/a	—N/a

_{*per team}

== Singles main-draw entrants ==
=== Seeds ===
Country	Player	Rank^{1}	Seed
ESP	Rafael Nadal	3	1
CAN	Félix Auger-Aliassime	15	2
AUS	Alex de Minaur	18	3
BUL	Grigor Dimitrov	21	4
ITA	Jannik Sinner	23	5
GBR	Dan Evans	27	6
GBR	Cameron Norrie	29	7
USA	Reilly Opelka	36	8
KAZ	Alexander Bublik	39	9
USA	Taylor Fritz	42	10
AUS	John Millman	44	11
USA	Sebastian Korda	47	12
FRA	Benoît Paire	49	13
RSA	Lloyd Harris	51	14
SRB	Miomir Kecmanović	52	15
USA	Frances Tiafoe	54	16

- ^{1} Rankings are as of July 26, 2021

=== Other entrants ===
The following players received wild cards into the singles main draw:

- (United States) Jenson Brooksby
- (Spain) Feliciano López
- (Spain) Rafael Nadal
- (United States) Brandon Nakashima
- (United States) Jack Sock

The following players received entry from the singles qualifying draw:

- (Ecuador) Emilio Gómez
- (India) Prajnesh Gunneswaran
- (United States) Mitchell Krueger
- (Ukraine) Illya Marchenko
- (India) Ramkumar Ramanathan
- (Sweden) Elias Ymer

=== Withdrawals ===
Before the tournament

- (Poland) Hubert Hurkacz → replaced by (Finland) Emil Ruusuvuori
- (United States) John Isner → replaced by (Italy) Andreas Seppi
- (Russia) Aslan Karatsev → replaced by (Colombia) Daniel Elahi Galán
- (Russia) Karen Khachanov → replaced by (United States) Mackenzie McDonald
- (Germany) Dominik Koepfer → replaced by (Belarus) Ilya Ivashka
- (South Korea) Kwon Soon-woo → replaced by (Australia) James Duckworth
- (Spain) Jaume Munar → replaced by (South Africa) Kevin Anderson
- (Argentina) Guido Pella → replaced by (United States) Steve Johnson
- (Spain) Albert Ramos Viñolas → replaced by (Australia) Jordan Thompson
- (Canada) Milos Raonic → replaced by (Lithuania) Ričardas Berankis
- (Canada) Denis Shapovalov → replaced by (Belarus) Egor Gerasimov

== Doubles main-draw entrants ==
=== Seeds ===
Country	Player	Country	Player	Rank^{1}	Seed
AUS	John Peers	SVK	Filip Polášek	36	1
GBR	Neal Skupski	NZL	Michael Venus	36	2
IND	Rohan Bopanna	CRO	Ivan Dodig	53	3
RSA	Raven Klaasen	JPN	Ben McLachlan	61	4

- ^{1} Rankings are as of July 26, 2021

=== Other entrants ===
The following pairs received wildcards into the doubles main draw:

- (Australia) Nick Kyrgios / (United States) Frances Tiafoe
- (United States) Sam Querrey / (United States) Jack Sock

The following pair received entry from the doubles qualifying draw:

- (France) Benoît Paire / (United States) Jackson Withrow

=== Withdrawals ===
Before the tournament

- (Colombia) Juan Sebastián Cabal / (Colombia) Robert Farah → replaced by (France) Fabrice Martin / (Australia) Max Purcell
- (Netherlands) Wesley Koolhof / (Netherlands) Jean-Julien Rojer → replaced by (Bulgaria) Grigor Dimitrov / (United States) Tommy Paul
- (Poland) Łukasz Kubot / (Brazil) Marcelo Melo → replaced by (New Zealand) Marcus Daniell / (Brazil) Marcelo Melo
- (Croatia) Nikola Mektić / (Croatia) Mate Pavić → replaced by (El Salvador) Marcelo Arévalo / (Netherlands) Matwé Middelkoop
- (United Kingdom) Jamie Murray / (Brazil) Bruno Soares → replaced by (United States) Sebastian Korda / (Italy) Jannik Sinner
- (United States) Rajeev Ram / (United Kingdom) Joe Salisbury → replaced by (Kazakhstan) Alexander Bublik / (Kazakhstan) Andrey Golubev

== Women's invitational ==
Between 2011 and 2019, the Citi Open hosted conjoining men and women tournaments. However, amid the COVID-19 pandemic in 2020, the Women's Tennis Association (WTA) revoked its sanction of the Citi Open for the year's tour and added two events to its provisional calendar instead: the Top Seed Open in Lexington, Kentucky and the Prague Open. After the Citi Open returned in 2021 from the event's eventual cancellation in the prior year, the WTA stayed its revocation of the event's sanction, so the women's tournament did not return as many women's players had scheduling conflicts with the 2020 Summer Olympics. In its place, event officials created the inaugural women's invitational as a three-day exhibition during the US Open Series. Coco Gauff, Jessica Pegula, and Jennifer Brady were the three original headliners, though Brady was later replaced by Victoria Azarenka.

The players played in a round-robin format; the winner of each pair in their first matches would then play each other in the final match. The games were played in a best-of-three set format with regular scoring and a 10-point "super tiebreak" to decide the third set. The player with the best record would be crowned the champion and in the case of a tie, the winner would be decided by the player who won the most sets or games. Because the tournament was not sanctioned by the WTA, the players would not accrue or lose any points. The prize money for the inaugural champion was set at $25,000. On August 5, Gauff defeated Azarenka in the first match, 6–3, 6–1. Azarenka was scheduled to play Pegula the following day, after Brady withdrew from the tournament, to decide the final match, but Azarenka herself later withdrew from the invitational after suffering an ankle injury. On August 7, Pegula defeated Gauff in the final match, 4–6, 7–5, [10-8], to win the invitational.
