= 2023 Mubadala Citi DC Open – Men's doubles =

Men's doubles
- 2023 Mubadala Citi DC Open

Final
- Champions: (Argentina) Máximo González (Argentina) Andrés Molteni
- Runners-up: (United States) Mackenzie McDonald (United States) Ben Shelton
- Score: 6–7^{(4–7)}, 6–2, [10–8]

Details
- Draw: 16
- Seeds: 4

Events
Singles	men	women
Doubles	men	women
- Washington Open

Máximo González and Andrés Molteni defeated Mackenzie McDonald and Ben Shelton in the final, 6–7^{(4–7)}, 6–2, [10–8] to win the men's doubles tennis title at the 2023 Washington Open.

Nick Kyrgios and Jack Sock were the reigning champions, but chose not to defend their title.

== Seeds ==
1. (United States) Rajeev Ram / (United Kingdom) Joe Salisbury (first round)
2. (United States) Austin Krajicek / (Croatia) Mate Pavić (first round)
3. (United Kingdom) Lloyd Glasspool / (Finland) Harri Heliövaara (semifinals)
4. (El Salvador) Marcelo Arévalo / (Netherlands) Jean-Julien Rojer (first round)

== Draw ==
Key

- Q = Qualifier
- WC = Wild card
- LL = Lucky loser
- Alt = Alternate
- ITF = ITF entry
- PR = Protected ranking
- SR = Special ranking
- SE = Special exempt
- JE = Junior exempt
- JR = Junior Accelerator Programme entrant
- CO = College Accelerator Programme entrant
- NG = Next Gen Accelerator Program entrant
- w/o = Walkover
- r = Retired
- d = Defaulted

=== Draw ===
First round
1	(United States) R Ram (United Kingdom) J Salisbury	6	1	[7]
(Colombia) JS Cabal (Australia) M Ebden	3	6	[10]
WC	(United States) M McDonald (United States) B Shelton	6	7^{7}
Q	(Kazakhstan) A Bublik (Netherlands) T Griekspoor	4	6^{4}
3	(United Kingdom) L Glasspool (Finland) H Heliövaara	3	6	[12]
(France) F Martin (Monaco) H Nys	6	2	[10]
(United States) C Eubanks (United States) S Korda	6	6^{9}	[7]
(Poland) H Hurkacz (United States) F Tiafoe	2	7^{11}	[10]
(Bulgaria) G Dimitrov (France) N Mahut	7^{7}	3	[5]
(United Kingdom) J Murray (New Zealand) M Venus	6^{3}	6	[10]
(Belgium) S Gillé (Belgium) J Vliegen	7^{8}	6
4	(El Salvador) M Arévalo (Netherlands) J-J Rojer	6^{6}	4
(Argentina) M González (Argentina) A Molteni	6^{5}	7^{9}	[10]
(Netherlands) R Haase (Croatia) N Mektić	7^{7}	6^{7}	[8]
WC	(United Kingdom) D Evans (United Kingdom) A Murray	6	6
2	(United States) A Krajicek (Croatia) M Pavić	3	4

Quarterfinals
(Colombia) JS Cabal (Australia) M Ebden	4	6	[8]
WC	(United States) M McDonald (United States) B Shelton	6	3	[10]
3	(United Kingdom) L Glasspool (Finland) H Heliövaara	6	7^{7}
(Poland) H Hurkacz (United States) F Tiafoe	3	6^{5}
(United Kingdom) J Murray (New Zealand) M Venus	6^{4}	6	[8]
(Belgium) S Gillé (Belgium) J Vliegen	7^{7}	4	[10]
(Argentina) M González (Argentina) A Molteni	7^{9}	1	[10]
WC	(United Kingdom) D Evans (United Kingdom) A Murray	6^{7}	6	[8]

Semifinals
WC	(United States) M McDonald (United States) B Shelton	3	6	[12]
3	(United Kingdom) L Glasspool (Finland) H Heliövaara	6	3	[10]
(Belgium) S Gillé (Belgium) J Vliegen	6^{6}	6^{4}
(Argentina) M González (Argentina) A Molteni	7^{8}	7^{7}

Final
WC	(United States) M McDonald (United States) B Shelton	7^{7}	2	[6]
(Argentina) M González (Argentina) A Molteni	6^{4}	6	[10]

== Qualifying ==
=== Seeds ===
1. (India) Anirudh Chandrasekar / (India) Vijay Sundar Prashanth (qualifying competition)
2. (Kazakhstan) Alexander Bublik / (Netherlands) Tallon Griekspoor (qualified)

=== Qualifiers ===
1. (Kazakhstan) Alexander Bublik / (Netherlands) Tallon Griekspoor

=== Qualifying draw ===
First round
1	(India) Anirudh Chandrasekar (India) Vijay Sundar Prashanth	6	6^{4}	[11]
(Moldova) Radu Albot (Australia) John-Patrick Smith	4	7^{7}	[9]
WC	(United States) Marcos Giron (Philippines) Treat Huey	7	6^{8}	[8]
2	(Kazakhstan) Alexander Bublik (Netherlands) Tallon Griekspoor	5	7^{10}	[10]

Qualifying competition
1	(India) Anirudh Chandrasekar (India) Vijay Sundar Prashanth	5	6	[6]
2	(Kazakhstan) Alexander Bublik (Netherlands) Tallon Griekspoor	7	4	[10]
