= 2023 Mubadala Citi DC Open – Women's doubles =

Women's doubles
- 2023 Mubadala Citi DC Open

Final
- Champions: (Germany) Laura Siegemund; Vera Zvonareva
- Runners-up: (Chile) Alexa Guarachi (Romania) Monica Niculescu
- Score: 6–4, 6–4

Details
- Draw: 16
- Seeds: 4

Events
Singles	men	women
Doubles	men	women
- Washington Open

Laura Siegemund and Vera Zvonareva defeated Alexa Guarachi and Monica Niculescu in the final, 6–4, 6–4 to win the women's doubles title at the 2023 Washington Open.

Jessica Pegula and Erin Routliffe were the reigning champions, but Pegula did not participate this year. Routliffe partnered with Ingrid Neel, but lost in the first round to Shuko Aoyama and Gabriela Dabrowski.

== Seeds ==
1. (United States) Nicole Melichar-Martinez / (Australia) Ellen Perez (quarterfinals)
2. (Japan) Shuko Aoyama / (Canada) Gabriela Dabrowski (semifinals)
3. (Chinese Taipei) Chan Hao-ching / (Mexico) Giuliana Olmos (quarterfinals, withdrew)
4. (Japan) Miyu Kato / (Indonesia) Aldila Sutjiadi (first round)

== Draw ==
Key

- Q = Qualifier
- WC = Wild card
- LL = Lucky loser
- Alt = Alternate
- ITF = ITF entry
- PR = Protected ranking
- SR = Special ranking
- SE = Special exempt
- JE = Junior exempt
- JR = Junior Accelerator Programme entrant
- CO = College Accelerator Programme entrant
- NG = Next Gen Accelerator Program entrant
- w/o = Walkover
- r = Retired
- d = Defaulted

=== Draw ===
First round
1	(United States) N Melichar-Martinez (Australia) E Perez	7^{7}	5	[10]
A Blinkova (France) V Gracheva	6^{3}	7	[6]
(Slovakia) T Mihalíková (China) Z Yang	6	3	[7]
(Germany) L Siegemund; V Zvonareva	2	6	[10]
4	(Japan) M Kato (Indonesia) A Sutjiadi	4	3
(Ukraine) L Kichenok (Ukraine) N Kichenok	6	6
(Kazakhstan) A Danilina (Norway) U Eikeri	1	4
Alt	(Japan) M Ninomiya (United States) S Santamaria	6	6
(Chile) A Guarachi (Romania) M Niculescu	7^{7}	7
(Brazil) I Gamarra Martins; L Marozava	6^{4}	5
WC	(United States) H Baptiste (United States) S Stephens
3	(Chinese Taipei) H-c Chan (Mexico) G Olmos	w/o
(Croatia) P Martić (Greece) M Sakkari	3	6	[2]
PR	(United States) J Brady (United States) M Keys	6	1	[10]
(Estonia) I Neel (New Zealand) E Routliffe	3	2
2	(Japan) S Aoyama (Canada) G Dabrowski	6	6

Quarterfinals
1	(United States) N Melichar-Martinez (Australia) E Perez	4	6	[6]
(Germany) L Siegemund; V Zvonareva	6	3	[10]
(Ukraine) L Kichenok (Ukraine) N Kichenok	7^{7}	6
Alt	(Japan) M Ninomiya (United States) S Santamaria	6^{2}	3
(Chile) A Guarachi (Romania) M Niculescu	w/o
3	(Chinese Taipei) H-c Chan (Mexico) G Olmos
PR	(United States) J Brady (United States) M Keys	1	6	[7]
2	(Japan) S Aoyama (Canada) G Dabrowski	6	3	[10]

Semifinals
(Germany) L Siegemund; V Zvonareva	6	6
(Ukraine) L Kichenok (Ukraine) N Kichenok	1	3
(Chile) A Guarachi (Romania) M Niculescu	6	6
2	(Japan) S Aoyama (Canada) G Dabrowski	3	1

Final
(Germany) L Siegemund; V Zvonareva	6	6
(Chile) A Guarachi (Romania) M Niculescu	4	4
