= 2023 Mubadala Citi DC Open – Men's singles =

Men's singles
- 2023 Mubadala Citi DC Open

Final
- Champion: (United Kingdom) Dan Evans
- Runner-up: (Netherlands) Tallon Griekspoor
- Score: 7–5, 6–3

Details
- Draw: 48 (6Q / 4WC)
- Seeds: 16

Events
| Singles | men | women |
| Doubles | men | women |
- Washington Open

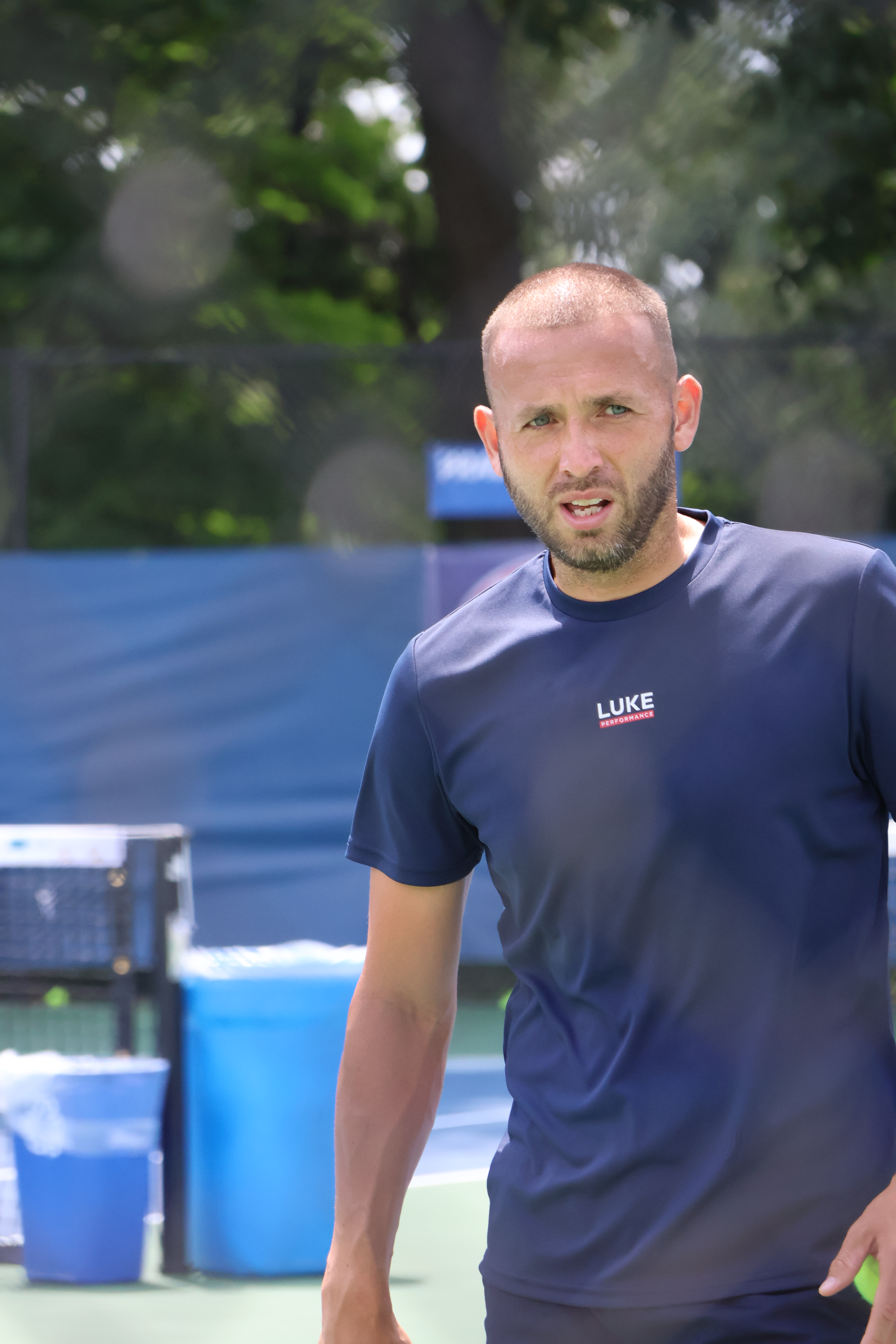
Dan Evans (pictured at practice) won his first ATP 500 title.

Dan Evans defeated Tallon Griekspoor in the final, 7–5, 6–3 to win the men's singles tennis title at the 2023 Washington Open. It was his second and last ATP Tour singles title.

Nick Kyrgios was the reigning champion, but withdrew due to injury before the tournament began.

== Seeds ==
All seeds received a bye into the second round.

1. (United States) Taylor Fritz (semifinals)
2. (United States) Frances Tiafoe (quarterfinals)
3. (Canada) Félix Auger-Aliassime (second round)
4. (Poland) Hubert Hurkacz (second round)
5. (Bulgaria) Grigor Dimitrov (semifinals)
6. (Kazakhstan) Alexander Bublik (second round)
7. (France) Adrian Mannarino (second round)
8. (United States) Sebastian Korda (second round)
9. (United Kingdom) Dan Evans (champion)
10. (Japan) Yoshihito Nishioka (second round)
11. (United States) Christopher Eubanks (third round)
12. (Netherlands) Tallon Griekspoor (final)
13. (France) Ugo Humbert (quarterfinals, withdrew)
14. (United States) Ben Shelton (second round)
15. (United Kingdom) Andy Murray (third round)
16. (United States) J. J. Wolf (quarterfinals)

Click on the seed number of a player to go to their draw section.

== Draw ==
Key

- Q = Qualifier
- WC = Wild card
- LL = Lucky loser
- Alt = Alternate
- ITF = ITF entry
- PR = Protected ranking
- SR = Special ranking
- SE = Special exempt
- JE = Junior exempt
- JR = Junior Accelerator Programme entrant
- CO = College Accelerator Programme entrant
- NG = Next Gen Accelerator Program entrant
- w/o = Walkover
- r = Retired
- d = Defaulted

=== Finals ===
Quarterfinals
1 | (United States) Taylor Fritz | 6 | 6
(Australia) Jordan Thompson | 3 | 3
16 | (United States) J. J. Wolf | 5 | 4
12 | (Netherlands) Tallon Griekspoor | 7 | 6
5 | (Bulgaria) Grigor Dimitrov | w/o
13 | (France) Ugo Humbert
9 | (United Kingdom) Dan Evans | 6 | 7
2 | (United States) Frances Tiafoe | 4 | 5

Semifinals
1 | (United States) Taylor Fritz | 6 | 3 | 2
12 | (Netherlands) Tallon Griekspoor | 3 | 6 | 6
5 | (Bulgaria) Grigor Dimitrov | 3 | 6^{4}
9 | (United Kingdom) Dan Evans | 6 | 7^{7}

Final
12 | (Netherlands) Tallon Griekspoor | 5 | 3
9 | (United Kingdom) Dan Evans | 7 | 6

=== Top half ===
==== Section 1 ====
First round
Q | (United States) Z Svajda | 4 | 7^{7} | 7
(Australia) M Purcell | 6 | 6^{2} | 5
(Australia) A Vukic | 6^{5} | 6^{9}
(United States) B Nakashima | 7^{7} | 7^{11}
PR | (South Africa) L Harris | 4 | 3
LL | (Japan) S Shimabukuro | 6 | 6
WC | (South Africa) K Anderson | 4 | 7^{7} | 1
(Australia) J Thompson | 6 | 6^{1} | 6

Second round
1 | (United States) T Fritz | 6 | 6
Q | (United States) Z Svajda | 3 | 3
(United States) B Nakashima | 6^{5} | 4
15 | (United Kingdom) A Murray | 7^{7} | 6
11 | (United States) C Eubanks | 6 | 6
LL | (Japan) S Shimabukuro | 3 | 4
(Australia) J Thompson | 7 | 6
7 | (France) A Mannarino | 5 | 4

Third round
1 | (United States) T Fritz | 6^{2} | 6 | 6
15 | (United Kingdom) A Murray | 7^{7} | 3 | 4
11 | (United States) C Eubanks | 2 | 2
(Australia) J Thompson | 6 | 6

Quarterfinals
1 | (United States) T Fritz | 6 | 6
(Australia) J Thompson | 3 | 3

==== Section 2 ====
First round
Q | (United States) B Klahn | 3 | 3
(United States) M Mmoh | 6 | 6
(United States) M Giron | 3 | 7 | 5
(Moldova) R Albot | 6 | 5 | 7
(France) C Moutet | 6^{0} | 4
(United Kingdom) L Broady | 7^{7} | 6
WC | (France) G Monfils | 6 | 6
Q | (United States) B Fratangelo | 3 | 4

Second round
4 | (Poland) H Hurkacz | 3 | 7^{7} | 6^{4}
(United States) M Mmoh | 6 | 6^{4} | 7^{7}
(Moldova) R Albot | 1 | 3
16 | (United States) JJ Wolf | 6 | 6
12 | (Netherlands) T Griekspoor | 6 | 6
(United Kingdom) L Broady | 4 | 2
WC | (France) G Monfils | 6 | 6
6 | (Kazakhstan) A Bublik | 3 | 4

Third round
(United States) M Mmoh | 4 | 6^{5}
16 | (United States) JJ Wolf | 6 | 7^{7}
12 | (Netherlands) T Griekspoor | 6 | 1 | 6
WC | (France) G Monfils | 4 | 6 | 3

Quarterfinals
16 | (United States) JJ Wolf | 5 | 4
12 | (Netherlands) T Griekspoor | 7 | 6

=== Bottom half ===
==== Section 3 ====
First round
(United States) M McDonald | 6 | 6
(Argentina) D Schwartzman | 3 | 3
(Finland) E Ruusuvuori | 6 | 6
(France) C Lestienne | 4 | 4
(Japan) T Daniel | 6 | 4 | 4
(Australia) T Kokkinakis | 2 | 6 | 6
(Japan) Y Watanuki | 1
(China) Y Wu | 4^{r}

Second round
5 | (Bulgaria) G Dimitrov | 7^{8} | 6
(United States) M McDonald | 6^{6} | 2
(Finland) E Ruusuvuori | 6^{5} | 6 | 6
10 | (Japan) Y Nishioka | 7^{7} | 4 | 2
13 | (France) U Humbert | 7^{8} | 1 | 6
(Australia) T Kokkinakis | 6^{6} | 6 | 4
(Japan) Y Watanuki | 7^{12} | 7^{7}
3 | (Canada) F Auger-Aliassime | 6^{10} | 6^{3}

Third round
5 | (Bulgaria) G Dimitrov | 6 | 6
(Finland) E Ruusuvuori | 4 | 3
13 | (France) U Humbert | 6 | 6
(Japan) Y Watanuki | 0 | 2

Quarterfinals
5 | (Bulgaria) G Dimitrov | w/o
13 | (France) U Humbert

==== Section 4 ====
First round
(United States) M Cressy | 3 | 6^{8}
A Shevchenko | 6 | 7^{10}
Q | (Japan) S Mochizuki | 4 | 7^{9} | 3
(France) G Barrère | 6 | 6^{7} | 6
Q | (China) J Shang | 6 | 6
(Ecuador) E Gómez | 3 | 3
A Karatsev | 7^{7} | 6
Q | (New Zealand) K Pannu | 6^{3} | 1

Second round
8 | (United States) S Korda | 7 | 6^{4} | 4
A Shevchenko | 5 | 7^{7} | 6
(France) G Barrère | 6 | 0 | 3
9 | (United Kingdom) D Evans | 2 | 6 | 6
14/WC | (United States) B Shelton | 2 | 6 | 3
Q | (China) J Shang | 6 | 3 | 6
A Karatsev | 6^{5} | 6^{5}
2 | (United States) F Tiafoe | 7^{7} | 7^{7}

Third round
A Shevchenko | 4 | 3
9 | (United Kingdom) D Evans | 6 | 6
Q | (China) J Shang | 2 | 3
2 | (United States) F Tiafoe | 6 | 6

Quarterfinals
9 | (United Kingdom) D Evans | 6 | 7
2 | (United States) F Tiafoe | 4 | 5

== Qualifying ==
=== Seeds ===
1. (China) Shang Juncheng (qualified)
2. (Japan) Sho Shimabukuro (qualifying competition, lucky loser)
3. (United States) Denis Kudla (first round)
4. (Canada) Alexis Galarneau (qualifying competition)
5. (Japan) Shintaro Mochizuki (qualified)
6. (United States) Brandon Holt (qualifying competition, retired)
7. (United States) Zachary Svajda (qualified)
8. (United States) Mitchell Krueger (first round)
9. (India) Mukund Sasikumar (first round)
10. (Japan) James Trotter (first round)
11. (United States) Kyle Seelig (qualifying competition)
12. (United States) Thai-Son Kwiatkowski (qualifying competition)

=== Qualifiers ===
1. (China) Shang Juncheng
2. (United States) Bradley Klahn
3. (New Zealand) Kiranpal Pannu
4. (United States) Bjorn Fratangelo
5. (Japan) Shintaro Mochizuki
6. (United States) Zachary Svajda

=== Lucky loser ===
1. (Japan) Sho Shimabukuro

=== Draw ===
==== First qualifier ====
First round
1 | (China) Shang Juncheng | 6 | 6
(United States) Gage Brymer | 3 | 2
PR | (Canada) Peter Polansky | 2 | 0
12 | (United States) Thai-Son Kwiatkowski | 6 | 6

Qualifying competition
1 | (China) Shang Juncheng | 7^{7} | 6
12 | (United States) Thai-Son Kwiatkowski | 6^{5} | 2

==== Second qualifier ====
First round
2 | (Japan) Sho Shimabukuro | 6 | 6
(United States) Donald Young | 3 | 4
PR | (United States) Bradley Klahn | 6 | 7^{7}
10 | (Japan) James Trotter | 4 | 6^{4}

Qualifying competition
2 | (Japan) Sho Shimabukuro | 5 | 4
PR | (United States) Bradley Klahn | 7 | 6

==== Third qualifier ====
First round
3 | (United States) Denis Kudla | 6 | 3 | 4
(New Zealand) Kiranpal Pannu | 4 | 6 | 6
(United States) Bruno Kuzuhara | 6 | 6
9 | (India) Mukund Sasikumar | 4 | 2

Qualifying competition
(New Zealand) Kiranpal Pannu | 3 | 6 | 7^{8}
(United States) Bruno Kuzuhara | 6 | 2 | 6^{6}

==== Fourth qualifier ====
First round
4 | (Canada) Alexis Galarneau | 6 | 6
PR | (Colombia) Juan Sebastián Gómez | 1 | 0
WC | (United States) Bjorn Fratangelo | 3 | 7^{7} | 6
8 | (United States) Mitchell Krueger | 6 | 6^{5} | 4

Qualifying competition
4 | (Canada) Alexis Galarneau | 4 | 6 | 3
WC | (United States) Bjorn Fratangelo | 6 | 3 | 6

==== Fifth qualifier ====
First round
5 | (Japan) Shintaro Mochizuki | 6 | 6
(Brazil) Mateus Alves | 3 | 4
WC | (United States) Benjamin Kittay | 4 | 5
11 | (United States) Kyle Seelig | 6 | 7

Qualifying competition
5 | (Japan) Shintaro Mochizuki | 6 | 6
11 | (United States) Kyle Seelig | 3 | 2

==== Sixth qualifier ====
First round
6 | (United States) Brandon Holt | 7 | 6
WC | (United States) Andrew Fenty | 5 | 3
WC | (United States) Ryan Harrison | 3 | 6^{3}
7 | (United States) Zachary Svajda | 6 | 7^{7}

Qualifying competition
6 | (United States) Brandon Holt | 6^{3} | 0^{r}
7 | (United States) Zachary Svajda | 7^{7} | 3
