= 2023 Tennis in the Land – Doubles =

Doubles
- 2023 Tennis in the Land

Final
- Champions: (Japan) Miyu Kato (Indonesia) Aldila Sutjiadi
- Runners-up: (United States) Nicole Melichar-Martinez (Australia) Ellen Perez
- Score: 6–4, 6–7^{(4–7)}, [10–8]

Details
- Draw: 16
- Seeds: 4

Events
Singles	Doubles
← 2022 ·	Tennis in the Land	· 2024 →

Miyu Kato and Aldila Sutjiadi defeated the defending champions Nicole Melichar-Martinez and Ellen Perez in the final, 6–4, 6–7^{(4–7)}, [10–8] to win the doubles title at the 2023 Tennis in the Land.

== Seeds ==
1. (Czech Republic) Barbora Krejčíková / (Czech Republic) Kateřina Siniaková (quarterfinals)
2. (United States) Nicole Melichar-Martinez / (Australia) Ellen Perez (final)
3. (Japan) Shuko Aoyama / (Japan) Ena Shibahara (first round)
4. (Kazakhstan) Anna Danilina / (Chinese Taipei) Hsieh Su-wei (first round)

== Draw ==
Key

- Q = Qualifier
- WC = Wild card
- LL = Lucky loser
- Alt = Alternate
- ITF = ITF entry
- PR = Protected ranking
- SR = Special ranking
- SE = Special exempt
- JE = Junior exempt
- JR = Junior Accelerator Programme entrant
- CO = College Accelerator Programme entrant
- NG = Next Gen Accelerator Program entrant
- w/o = Walkover
- r = Retired
- d = Defaulted

=== Draw ===
First round
1	(Czech Republic) B Krejčíková (Czech Republic) K Siniaková	5	6	[10]
(Ukraine) L Kichenok (Ukraine) N Kichenok	7	3	[7]
(Chile) A Guarachi (United States) A Muhammad	3	4
(Canada) G Dabrowski (New Zealand) E Routliffe	6	6
4	(Kazakhstan) A Danilina (Chinese Taipei) S-w Hsieh	4	6	[9]
(Georgia (country)) O Kalashnikova (Czech Republic) M Kolodziejová	6	4	[11]
(Slovakia) T Mihalíková (China) Y Xu	4	2
(Japan) M Kato (Indonesia) A Sutjiadi	6	6
(Chinese Taipei) L Chan (China) Z Yang	3	6^{1}
(Japan) M Ninomiya (United States) S Santamaria	6	7^{7}
(Chinese Taipei) H-c Chan (Mexico) G Olmos	6	2	[11]
3	(Japan) S Aoyama (Japan) E Shibahara	2	6	[9]
WC	(United States) D Hewitt (United States) J Loeb	6	3	[12]
WC	E Alexandrova; A Sasnovich	4	6	[14]
(Brazil) I Gamarra Martins; L Marozava	4	3
2	(United States) N Melichar-Martinez (Australia) E Perez	6	6

Quarterfinals
1	(Czech Republic) B Krejčíková (Czech Republic) K Siniaková	7^{9}	6^{4}	[9]
(Canada) G Dabrowski (New Zealand) E Routliffe	6^{7}	7^{7}	[11]
(Georgia (country)) O Kalashnikova (Czech Republic) M Kolodziejová	6	2	[6]
(Japan) M Kato (Indonesia) A Sutjiadi	3	6	[10]
(Japan) M Ninomiya (United States) S Santamaria	6	6^{4}	[3]
(Chinese Taipei) H-c Chan (Mexico) G Olmos	4	7^{7}	[10]
WC	E Alexandrova; A Sasnovich
2	(United States) N Melichar-Martinez (Australia) E Perez	w/o

Semifinals
(Canada) G Dabrowski (New Zealand) E Routliffe	5	7^{7}	[7]
(Japan) M Kato (Indonesia) A Sutjiadi	7	6^{5}	[10]
(Chinese Taipei) H-c Chan (Mexico) G Olmos	3	7^{7}	[8]
2	(United States) N Melichar-Martinez (Australia) E Perez	6	6^{5}	[10]

Final
(Japan) M Kato (Indonesia) A Sutjiadi	6	6^{4}	[10]
2	(United States) N Melichar-Martinez (Australia) E Perez	4	7^{7}	[8]
