= 2021 Citi Open – Doubles =

Doubles
- 2021 Citi Open

Final
- Champions: (South Africa) Raven Klaasen (Japan) Ben McLachlan
- Runners-up: (United Kingdom) Neal Skupski (New Zealand) Michael Venus
- Score: 7–6^{(7–4)}, 6–4

Details
- Draw: 16
- Seeds: 4

Events
Singles	Doubles
- Washington Open

Raven Klaasen and Michael Venus were the reigning doubles champions from when the tournament was last held in 2019, but both players chose to participate with different partners.

Klaasen partnered alongside Ben McLachlan and successfully defended his title, defeating Venus and Neal Skupski in the final, 7–6^{(7–4)}, 6–4.

== Seeds ==
1. (Australia) John Peers / (Slovakia) Filip Polášek (first round)
2. (United Kingdom) Neal Skupski / (New Zealand) Michael Venus (final)
3. (India) Rohan Bopanna / (Croatia) Ivan Dodig (first round)
4. (South Africa) Raven Klaasen / (Japan) Ben McLachlan (champions)

== Draw ==
Key

- Q = Qualifier
- WC = Wild card
- LL = Lucky loser
- Alt = Alternate
- ITF = ITF entry
- PR = Protected ranking
- SR = Special ranking
- SE = Special exempt
- JE = Junior exempt
- JR = Junior Accelerator Programme entrant
- CO = College Accelerator Programme entrant
- NG = Next Gen Accelerator Program entrant
- w/o = Walkover
- r = Retired
- d = Defaulted

=== Draw ===
First round
1	(Australia) J Peers (Slovakia) F Polášek	6^{4}	7	[7]
(Australia) A de Minaur (Australia) J Millman	7^{7}	5	[10]
(El Salvador) M Arévalo (Netherlands) M Middelkoop	6^{8}	2
(New Zealand) M Daniell (Brazil) M Melo	7^{10}	6
4	(South Africa) R Klaasen (Japan) B McLachlan	7	6
(Kazakhstan) A Bublik (Kazakhstan) A Golubev	5	2
WC	(United States) S Querrey (United States) J Sock	6^{8}	2
(Bulgaria) G Dimitrov (United States) T Paul	7^{10}	6
(United States) S Korda (Italy) J Sinner	1	6	[13]
Q	(France) B Paire (United States) J Withrow	6	4	[11]
WC	(Australia) N Kyrgios (United States) F Tiafoe	7	1	[11]
3	(India) R Bopanna (Croatia) I Dodig	5	6	[9]
(United Kingdom) C Norrie (Australia) L Saville	6	6
(Belgium) S Gillé (Belgium) J Vliegen	4	4
(France) F Martin (Australia) M Purcell	5	3
2	(United Kingdom) N Skupski (New Zealand) M Venus	7	6

Quarterfinals
(Australia) A de Minaur (Australia) J Millman	6	1	[8]
(New Zealand) M Daniell (Brazil) M Melo	3	6	[10]
4	(South Africa) R Klaasen (Japan) B McLachlan	w/o
(Bulgaria) G Dimitrov (United States) T Paul
(United States) S Korda (Italy) J Sinner	6	6
WC	(Australia) N Kyrgios (United States) F Tiafoe	4	4
(United Kingdom) C Norrie (Australia) L Saville	2	3
2	(United Kingdom) N Skupski (New Zealand) M Venus	6	6

Semifinals
(New Zealand) M Daniell (Brazil) M Melo	4	5
4	(South Africa) R Klaasen (Japan) B McLachlan	6	7
(United States) S Korda (Italy) J Sinner	3	0
2	(United Kingdom) N Skupski (New Zealand) M Venus	6	6

Final
4	(South Africa) R Klaasen (Japan) B McLachlan	7^{7}	6
2	(United Kingdom) N Skupski (New Zealand) M Venus	6^{4}	4

== Qualifying ==
=== Seeds ===
1. (United Kingdom) Luke Bambridge / (United Kingdom) Ken Skupski (first round)
2. (France) Benoît Paire / (United States) Jackson Withrow (qualified)

=== Qualifiers ===
1. (France) Benoît Paire / (United States) Jackson Withrow

=== Qualifying draw ===
First round
1	(United Kingdom) Luke Bambridge (United Kingdom) Ken Skupski	3	6^{3}
WC	(United States) Nathaniel Lammons (United States) Nicholas Monroe	6	7^{7}
(Israel) Jonathan Erlich (South Africa) Lloyd Harris	7	4	[6]
2	(France) Benoît Paire (United States) Jackson Withrow	5	6	[10]

Qualifying competition
WC	(United States) Nathaniel Lammons (United States) Nicholas Monroe	2	4
2	(France) Benoît Paire (United States) Jackson Withrow	6	6
