= 2021 Citi Open – Singles =

Singles
- 2021 Citi Open

Final
- Champion: (Italy) Jannik Sinner
- Runner-up: (United States) Mackenzie McDonald
- Score: 7–5, 4–6, 7–5

Details
- Draw: 48 (6Q / 4WC)
- Seeds: 16

Events
Singles	Doubles
- Washington Open

Fifth-seeded Jannik Sinner defeated Mackenzie McDonald in the final, 7–5, 4–6, 7–5 to win the singles tennis title at the 2021 Citi Open. With the victory, Sinner became the youngest player and first teenager on the ATP Tour to win an ATP 500 title since the category was created in 2009.

Nick Kyrgios was the reigning champion from when the tournament was last held in 2019, but lost in the first round to McDonald.

== Seeds ==
All seeds receive a bye into the second round.

1. (Spain) Rafael Nadal (third round)
2. (Canada) Félix Auger-Aliassime (third round)
3. (Australia) Alex de Minaur (second round)
4. (Bulgaria) Grigor Dimitrov (second round)
5. (Italy) Jannik Sinner (champion)
6. (United Kingdom) Dan Evans (second round)
7. (United Kingdom) Cameron Norrie (third round)
8. (United States) Reilly Opelka (third round)

9. (Kazakhstan) Alexander Bublik (second round)
10. (United States) Taylor Fritz (second round)
11. (Australia) John Millman (quarterfinals)
12. (United States) Sebastian Korda (third round)
13. (France) Benoît Paire (second round)
14. (South Africa) Lloyd Harris (quarterfinals)
15. (Serbia) Miomir Kecmanović (second round)
16. (United States) Frances Tiafoe (second round)

Click on the seed number of a player to go to their draw section.

== Draw ==
Key

- Q = Qualifier
- WC = Wild card
- LL = Lucky loser
- Alt = Alternate
- ITF = ITF entry
- PR = Protected ranking
- SR = Special ranking
- SE = Special exempt
- JE = Junior exempt
- JR = Junior Accelerator Programme entrant
- CO = College Accelerator Programme entrant
- NG = Next Gen Accelerator Program entrant
- w/o = Walkover
- r = Retired
- d = Defaulted

=== Finals ===
Quarterfinals
14	(South Africa) Lloyd Harris	3	5
(Japan) Kei Nishikori	6	7
(United States) Mackenzie McDonald	6	6
(United States) Denis Kudla	3	2
5	(Italy) Jannik Sinner	6	6
(United States) Steve Johnson	4	2
11	(Australia) John Millman	1	2
WC	(United States) Jenson Brooksby	6	6

Semifinals
(Japan) Kei Nishikori	4	6	5
(United States) Mackenzie McDonald	6	3	7
5	(Italy) Jannik Sinner	7^{7}	6
WC	(United States) Jenson Brooksby	6^{2}	1

Final
(United States) Mackenzie McDonald	5	6	5
5	(Italy) Jannik Sinner	7	4	7

=== Top half ===
==== Section 1 ====
First round
WC	(United States) J Sock	6^{3}	4
(Japan) Y Nishioka	7^{7}	0^{r}
(United States) T Sandgren	6	2	6
(Australia) J Duckworth	3	6	2
(Japan) K Nishikori	6	6
(United States) S Querrey	4	3
(United States) M Giron	4	6	7^{7}
Q	(Ukraine) I Marchenko	6	4	6^{1}

Second round
1/WC	(Spain) R Nadal	6	4	7^{7}
WC	(United States) J Sock	2	6	6^{1}
(United States) T Sandgren	4	0^{r}
14	(South Africa) L Harris	6	1
9	(Kazakhstan) A Bublik	2	5
(Japan) K Nishikori	6	7
(United States) M Giron	4	3
7	(United Kingdom) C Norrie	6	6

Third round
1/WC	(Spain) R Nadal	4	6	4
14	(South Africa) L Harris	6	1	6
(Japan) K Nishikori	3	6	6
7	(United Kingdom) C Norrie	6	3	3

Quarterfinals
14	(South Africa) L Harris	3	5
(Japan) K Nishikori	6	7

==== Section 2 ====
First round
(Belarus) E Gerasimov	5	4
(Belarus) I Ivashka	7	6
(United States) M McDonald	6	6
(Australia) N Kyrgios	4	4
(United States) D Kudla	6	6^{5}	6
WC	(Spain) F López	3	7^{7}	3
WC	(United States) B Nakashima	6	6
(Australia) A Popyrin	3	3

Second round
4	(Bulgaria) G Dimitrov	2	6^{4}
(Belarus) I Ivashka	6	7^{7}
(United States) M McDonald	6^{6}	6	6
13	(France) B Paire	7^{8}	4	4
10	(United States) T Fritz	4	2
(United States) D Kudla	6	6
WC	(United States) B Nakashima	7^{7}	6
6	(United Kingdom) D Evans	6^{1}	0

Third round
(Belarus) I Ivashka	4	4
(United States) M McDonald	6	6
(United States) D Kudla	3	7^{7}	6
WC	(United States) B Nakashima	6	6^{3}	4

Quarterfinals
(United States) M McDonald	6	6
(United States) D Kudla	3	2

=== Bottom half ===
==== Section 3 ====
First round
Q	(India) P Gunneswaran	6	1	1
(Finland) E Ruusuvuori	2	6	6
Q	(Ecuador) E Gómez	6	3	3
(Canada) V Pospisil	4	6	6
Q	(United States) M Krueger	6^{4}	2
(Lithuania) R Berankis	7^{7}	6
(United States) S Johnson	6	7^{7}
Q	(India) R Ramanathan	3	6^{0}

Second round
5	(Italy) J Sinner	6	6
(Finland) E Ruusuvuori	2	4
(Canada) V Pospisil	5	4
12	(United States) S Korda	7	6
15	(Serbia) M Kecmanović	3	2
(Lithuania) R Berankis	6	6
(United States) S Johnson	6^{5}	6	6
3	(Australia) A de Minaur	7^{7}	4	2

Third round
5	(Italy) J Sinner	7^{7}	7^{7}
12	(United States) S Korda	6^{3}	6^{3}
(Lithuania) R Berankis	2	1
(United States) S Johnson	6	6

Quarterfinals
5	(Italy) J Sinner	6	6
(United States) S Johnson	4	2

==== Section 4 ====
First round
(United States) T Paul	4	3
(Colombia) DE Galán	6	6
Q	(Sweden) E Ymer	3	7	6
(Australia) J Thompson	6	5	3
(South Africa) K Anderson	6^{4}	3
WC	(United States) J Brooksby	7^{7}	6
(Japan) Y Uchiyama	6	5	3
(Italy) A Seppi	3	7	6

Second round
8	(United States) R Opelka	7^{7}	6
(Colombia) DE Galán	6^{1}	3
Q	(Sweden) E Ymer	2	6^{8}
11	(Australia) J Millman	6	7^{10}
16	(United States) F Tiafoe	6^{4}	5
WC	(United States) J Brooksby	7^{7}	7
(Italy) A Seppi	6	2	2
2	(Canada) F Auger-Aliassime	2	6	6

Third round
8	(United States) R Opelka	3	6^{4}
11	(Australia) J Millman	6	7^{7}
WC	(United States) J Brooksby	6	6
2	(Canada) F Auger-Aliassime	3	4

Quarterfinals
11	(Australia) J Millman	1	2
WC	(United States) J Brooksby	6	6

== Qualifying ==
=== Seeds ===
1. (Japan) Yasutaka Uchiyama (moved to the main draw)
2. (United Kingdom) Liam Broady (qualifying competition)
3. (United States) J. J. Wolf (qualifying competition)
4. (United States) Maxime Cressy (qualifying competition)
5. (Russia) Evgeny Donskoy (first round)
6. (India) Prajnesh Gunneswaran (qualified)
7. (Ukraine) Illya Marchenko (qualified)
8. (Chinese Taipei) Jason Jung (first round)
9. (Austria) Sebastian Ofner (qualifying competition)
10. (Ecuador) Emilio Gómez (qualified)
11. (Sweden) Elias Ymer (qualified)
12. (United States) Mitchell Krueger (qualified)

=== Qualifiers ===
1. (India) Ramkumar Ramanathan
2. (Ecuador) Emilio Gómez
3. (Sweden) Elias Ymer
4. (Ukraine) Illya Marchenko
5. (United States) Mitchell Krueger
6. (India) Prajnesh Gunneswaran

=== Qualifying draw ===
==== First qualifier ====
First round
Alt	(India) Ramkumar Ramanathan	6	3	6
Alt	(United States) Christopher Eubanks	4	6	3
PR	(Japan) Tatsuma Ito	6^{4}	2
9	(Austria) Sebastian Ofner	7^{7}	6

Qualifying competition
Alt	(India) Ramkumar Ramanathan	7	6
9	(Austria) Sebastian Ofner	5	1

==== Second qualifier ====
First round
2	(United Kingdom) Liam Broady	6	2	6
Alt	(Denmark) Mikael Torpegaard	4	6	3
Alt	(Australia) Matthew Ebden	3	1
10	(Ecuador) Emilio Gómez	6	6

Qualifying competition
2	(United Kingdom) Liam Broady	4	6^{0}
10	(Ecuador) Emilio Gómez	6	7^{7}

==== Third qualifier ====
First round
3/PR	(United States) J. J. Wolf	6^{5}	7^{7}	6
WC	(United States) Ulises Blanch	7^{7}	6^{3}	3
(United States) Bjorn Fratangelo	4	3
11	(Sweden) Elias Ymer	6	6

Qualifying competition
3/PR	(United States) J. J. Wolf	6^{5}	6^{4}
11	(Sweden) Elias Ymer	7^{7}	7^{7}

==== Fourth qualifier ====
First round
4	(United States) Maxime Cressy	6	7
(United States) Michael Mmoh	2	5
WC	(Croatia) Ivo Karlović	3	7^{12}	3
7	(Ukraine) Illya Marchenko	6	6^{10}	6

Qualifying competition
4	(United States) Maxime Cressy	5	7^{7}	3
7	(Ukraine) Illya Marchenko	7	6^{4}	6

==== Fifth qualifier ====
First round
5	(Russia) Evgeny Donskoy	6^{5}	4
Alt	(Australia) Max Purcell	7^{7}	6
WC	(United States) Andrew Fenty	4	4
12	(United States) Mitchell Krueger	6	6

Qualifying competition
Alt	(Australia) Max Purcell	6	3	2
12	(United States) Mitchell Krueger	3	6	6

==== Sixth qualifier ====
First round
6	(India) Prajnesh Gunneswaran	6	6
WC	(Australia) Luke Saville	2	2
(Japan) Go Soeda	6	6^{2}	6
8	(Chinese Taipei) Jason Jung	4	7^{7}	4

Qualifying competition
6	(India) Prajnesh Gunneswaran	6	6
(Japan) Go Soeda	3	1
