= 2023 Tennis in the Land – Singles =

Singles
- 2023 Tennis in the Land

Final
- Champion: (Spain) Sara Sorribes Tormo
- Runner-up: Ekaterina Alexandrova
- Score: 3–6, 6–4, 6–4

Details
- Draw: 32 (6Q / 4WC)
- Seeds: 8

Events
Singles	Doubles
- Tennis in the Land

Sara Sorribes Tormo defeated Ekaterina Alexandrova in the final, 3–6, 6–4, 6–4 to win the singles title at the 2023 Tennis in the Land. She won the title as a lucky loser, becoming just the sixth player in WTA Tour history to do so and the third within a five-week span.

Liudmila Samsonova was the reigning champion, but withdrew before the tournament began.

== Seeds ==
1. (France) Caroline Garcia (quarterfinals)
2. (Czech Republic) Barbora Krejčíková (first round)
3. Veronika Kudermetova (second round)
4. Ekaterina Alexandrova (final)
5. (Ukraine) Anhelina Kalinina (second round, withdrew)
6. (Italy) Elisabetta Cocciaretto (withdrew)
7. (Egypt) Mayar Sherif (withdrew)
8. Anna Blinkova (first round)
9. (United States) Sloane Stephens (quarterfinals)
10. (Romania) Irina-Camelia Begu (withdrew)
11. (Italy) Jasmine Paolini (second round)

== Draw ==
Key

- Q = Qualifier
- WC = Wild card
- LL = Lucky loser
- Alt = Alternate
- ITF = ITF entry
- PR = Protected ranking
- SR = Special ranking
- SE = Special exempt
- JE = Junior exempt
- JR = Junior Accelerator Programme entrant
- CO = College Accelerator Programme entrant
- NG = Next Gen Accelerator Program entrant
- w/o = Walkover
- r = Retired
- d = Defaulted

=== Finals ===
Semifinals
(China) Zhu Lin	5	2
4	Ekaterina Alexandrova	7	6
LL	(Spain) Sara Sorribes Tormo	6	6
(Germany) Tatjana Maria	4	3

Final
4	Ekaterina Alexandrova	6	4	4
LL	(Spain) Sara Sorribes Tormo	3	6	6

=== Top half ===
First round
1/WC	(France) C Garcia	6	6
(Czech Republic) L Fruhvirtová	3	2
(United States) P Stearns	6	4
LL	(Italy) M Trevisan	1	5^{r}
Q	(China) Xiy Wang	3	4
(Austria) J Grabher	6	6
(China) L Zhu	6	6
8	A Blinkova	0	3
4	E Alexandrova	6	6
Alt/PR	(Romania) PM Țig	1	4
(United States) E Navarro	6	4	5
Q	A Sasnovich	3	6	7
Q	(France) C Burel	6^{5}	6	5
Q	(China) Xin Wang	7^{7}	4	7
Q	(Poland) M Fręch	1	3
11	(Italy) J Paolini	6	6

Second round
1/WC	(France) C Garcia	7^{7}	6
(United States) P Stearns	6^{4}	3
(Austria) J Grabher	4	1
(China) L Zhu	6	6
4	E Alexandrova	7^{7}	6
Q	A Sasnovich	6^{2}	3
Q	(China) Xin Wang	6	6
11	(Italy) J Paolini	4	3

Quarterfinals
1/WC	(France) C Garcia	4	1
(China) L Zhu	6	6
4	E Alexandrova	5	6	7
Q	(China) Xin Wang	7	0	5

Semifinals
(China) L Zhu	5	2
4	E Alexandrova	7	6

=== Bottom half ===
First round
9	(United States) S Stephens	1	6	6
(United States) L Davis	6	3	1
M Andreeva	6	3	7
LL	(Germany) T Korpatsch	0	6	5
(Czech Republic) K Siniaková	2	0^{r}
LL	(Spain) S Sorribes Tormo	6	4
Q	(Argentina) N Podoroska	6	2	1
3/WC	V Kudermetova	3	6	6
5	(Ukraine) A Kalinina	6	6
(Romania) A Bogdan	2	2
(Germany) T Maria	6	2	6
(France) V Gracheva	2	6	1
(Czech Republic) L Nosková	0	2
WC	(Canada) L Fernandez	6	6
LL	(Denmark) C Tauson	6	6
2	(Czech Republic) B Krejčíková	4	1

Second round
9	(United States) S Stephens	6	6
M Andreeva	3	3
LL	(Spain) S Sorribes Tormo	6	6
3/WC	V Kudermetova	4	1
5	(Ukraine) A Kalinina
(Germany) T Maria	w/o
WC	(Canada) L Fernandez	6	0
LL	(Denmark) C Tauson	0	0^{r}

Quarterfinals
9	(United States) S Stephens	1	3
LL	(Spain) S Sorribes Tormo	6	6
(Germany) T Maria	6	6
WC	(Canada) L Fernandez	3	2

Semifinals
LL	(Spain) S Sorribes Tormo	6	6
(Germany) T Maria	4	3

== Qualifying ==
=== Seeds ===
1. (China) Wang Xinyu (qualified)
2. (France) Clara Burel (qualified)
3. (Italy) Martina Trevisan (qualifying competition, lucky loser)
4. (Argentina) Nadia Podoroska (qualified)
5. Aliaksandra Sasnovich (qualified)
6. (Poland) Magdalena Fręch (qualified)
7. (Germany) Tamara Korpatsch (qualifying competition, lucky loser)
8. (Denmark) Clara Tauson (qualifying competition, lucky loser)
9. (China) Wang Xiyu (qualified)
10. (Spain) Sara Sorribes Tormo (qualifying competition, lucky loser)
11. (United States) Jamie Loeb (qualifying competition)
12. (Mexico) Fernanda Contreras (qualifying competition)

=== Qualifiers ===
1. (China) Wang Xinyu
2. (France) Clara Burel
3. (China) Wang Xiyu
4. (Argentina) Nadia Podoroska
5. Aliaksandra Sasnovich
6. (Poland) Magdalena Fręch

=== Lucky losers ===
1. (Italy) Martina Trevisan
2. (Germany) Tamara Korpatsch
3. (Denmark) Clara Tauson
4. (Spain) Sara Sorribes Tormo

=== Qualifying draw ===
==== First qualifier ====
First round
1	(China) Wang Xinyu	6	6
Alt	(Japan) Ena Shibahara	2	3
WC	(United States) Rylie Hanford	1	6	1
11	(United States) Jamie Loeb	6	3	6

Qualifying competition
1	(China) Wang Xinyu	7	6
11	(United States) Jamie Loeb	5	4

==== Second qualifier ====
First round
2	(France) Clara Burel	2	7^{8}	6
(United States) Dalayna Hewitt	6	6^{6}	4
(United States) Asia Muhammad	1	2
10	(Spain) Sara Sorribes Tormo	6	6

Qualifying competition
2	(France) Clara Burel	6	4	6
10	(Spain) Sara Sorribes Tormo	3	6	1

==== Third qualifier ====
First round
3	(Italy) Martina Trevisan	6	7^{7}
(United States) Alana Smith	1	6^{1}
(Ukraine) Valeriya Strakhova	4	1
9	(China) Wang Xiyu	6	6

Qualifying competition
3	(Italy) Martina Trevisan	1	6	3
9	(China) Wang Xiyu	6	3	6

==== Fourth qualifier ====
First round
4	(Argentina) Nadia Podoroska	6	7^{7}
(New Zealand) Erin Routliffe	1	6^{5}
(United States) Victoria Hu	3	2
8	(Denmark) Clara Tauson	6	6

Qualifying competition
4	(Argentina) Nadia Podoroska	6	6
8	(Denmark) Clara Tauson	3	4

==== Fifth qualifier ====
First round
5	Aliaksandra Sasnovich	6	6
(Ukraine) Hanna Poznikhirenko	4	2
(United States) Jessie Aney	2	3
12	(Mexico) Fernanda Contreras	6	6

Qualifying competition
5	Aliaksandra Sasnovich	7	4	6
12	(Mexico) Fernanda Contreras	5	6	2

==== Sixth qualifier ====
First round
6	(Poland) Magdalena Fręch	6	6
(Argentina) Guillermina Naya	0	1
Alt	(Japan) Miyu Kato	6	4	1
7	(Germany) Tamara Korpatsch	3	6	6

Qualifying competition
6	(Poland) Magdalena Fręch	6	6
7	(Germany) Tamara Korpatsch	3	3
