= 2019 Citi Open – Men's singles =

Men's singles
- 2019 Citi Open

Final
- Champion: (Australia) Nick Kyrgios
- Runner-up: (Russia) Daniil Medvedev
- Score: 7–6^{(8–6)}, 7–6^{(7–4)}

Details
- Draw: 48 (6Q / 4WC)
- Seeds: 16

Events
| Singles | men | women |
| Doubles | men | women |
| ← 2018 · | Citi Open | · 2021 → |

Nick Kyrgios defeated Daniil Medvedev in the final, 7–6^{(8–6)}, 7–6^{(7–4)} to win the men's singles tennis title at the 2019 Washington Open. Kyrgios saved a match point in the semifinals against Stefanos Tsitsipas.

Alexander Zverev was the two-time reigning champion, but did not defend his title.

== Seeds ==
All seeds receive a bye into the second round.

1. (Greece) Stefanos Tsitsipas (semifinals)
2. (Russia) Karen Khachanov (second round)
3. (Russia) Daniil Medvedev (final)
4. (South Africa) Kevin Anderson (withdrew)
5. (United States) John Isner (third round)
6. (Croatia) Marin Čilić (quarterfinals)
7. (Belgium) David Goffin (second round)
8. (Canada) Milos Raonic (third round)

9. (Canada) Félix Auger-Aliassime (third round)
10. (France) Benoît Paire (quarterfinals)
11. (France) Gilles Simon (second round)
12. (Australia) Alex de Minaur (second round)
13. (United Kingdom) Kyle Edmund (quarterfinals)
14. (Germany) Jan-Lennard Struff (second round)
15. (France) Pierre-Hugues Herbert (second round)
16. (United States) Frances Tiafoe (third round)

Click on the seed number of a player to go to their draw section.

== Draw ==
=== Key ===
- Q = Qualifier
- WC = Wild card
- LL = Lucky loser
- Alt = Alternate
- ITF = ITF entry
- PR = Protected ranking
- SR = Special ranking
- SE = Special exempt
- JE = Junior exempt
- JR = Junior Accelerator Programme entrant
- CO = College Accelerator Programme entrant
- NG = Next Gen Accelerator Program entrant
- w/o = Walkover
- r = Retired
- d = Defaulted

=== Finals ===
Quarterfinals
1 | (Greece) Stefanos Tsitsipas | 7 | 6
10 | (France) Benoît Paire | 5 | 0
LL | (Slovakia) Norbert Gombos | 3 | 3
(Australia) Nick Kyrgios | 6 | 6
6 | (Croatia) Marin Čilić | 4 | 6^{7}
3 | (Russia) Daniil Medvedev | 6 | 7^{9}
LL | (Germany) Peter Gojowczyk | 6 | 4 | 6
13 | (United Kingdom) Kyle Edmund | 3 | 6 | 3

Semifinals
1 | (Greece) Stefanos Tsitsipas | 4 | 6 | 6^{7}
(Australia) Nick Kyrgios | 6 | 3 | 7^{9}
3 | (Russia) Daniil Medvedev | 6 | 6
LL | (Germany) Peter Gojowczyk | 2 | 2

Final
(Australia) Nick Kyrgios | 7^{8} | 7^{7}
3 | (Russia) Daniil Medvedev | 6^{6} | 6^{4}

=== Top half ===
==== Section 1 ====
First round
(United States) D Kudla | 0 | 4
WC | (United States) T Paul | 6 | 6
WC | (United States) J Sock | 5 | 3
(Australia) J Thompson | 7 | 6
(Tunisia) M Jaziri | 2 | 4
Q | (Australia) M Polmans | 6 | 6
(Poland) H Hurkacz | 6 | 6
Q | (United States) D Young | 1 | 4

Second round
1 | (Greece) S Tsitsipas | 6 | 7
WC | (United States) T Paul | 3 | 5
(Australia) J Thompson | 6^{8} | 6 | 7
14 | (Germany) J-L Struff | 7^{10} | 4 | 5
10 | (France) B Paire | 6 | 6^{5} | 7^{7}
Q | (Australia) M Polmans | 3 | 7^{7} | 6^{5}
(Poland) H Hurkacz | 4 | 4
5 | (United States) J Isner | 6 | 6

Third round
1 | (Greece) S Tsitsipas | 6 | 7^{7}
(Australia) J Thompson | 3 | 6^{4}
10 | (France) B Paire | 7^{7} | 6
5 | (United States) J Isner | 6^{3} | 3

Quarterfinals
1 | (Greece) S Tsitsipas | 7 | 6
10 | (France) B Paire | 5 | 0

==== Section 2 ====
First round
(France) A Mannarino | 7^{7} | 6
LL | (Belarus) I Ivashka | 6^{3} | 3
(Serbia) M Kecmanović | 7^{8} | 6
(Australia) A Popyrin | 6^{6} | 3
Q | (United States) T-S Kwiatkowski | 5 | 4
(Australia) N Kyrgios | 7 | 6
(United Kingdom) D Evans | 4 | 1
(Japan) Y Nishioka | 6 | 6

Second round
LL | (Slovakia) N Gombos | 6 | 7^{11}
(France) A Mannarino | 4 | 6^{9}
(Serbia) M Kecmanović | 3 | 6 | 7^{7}
15 | (France) P-H Herbert | 6 | 4 | 6^{5}
11 | (France) G Simon | 4 | 6^{5}
(Australia) N Kyrgios | 6 | 7^{7}
(Japan) Y Nishioka | 6^{5} | 6 | 7^{7}
7 | (Belgium) D Goffin | 7^{7} | 2 | 6^{5}

Third round
LL | (Slovakia) N Gombos | 1 | 6 | 7^{7}
(Serbia) M Kecmanović | 6 | 3 | 6^{4}
(Australia) N Kyrgios | 6 | 7
(Japan) Y Nishioka | 2 | 5

Quarterfinals
LL | (Slovakia) N Gombos | 3 | 3
(Australia) N Kyrgios | 6 | 6

=== Bottom half ===
==== Section 3 ====
First round
Q | (Denmark) M Torpegaard | 1 | 7 | 3
(Romania) M Copil | 6 | 5 | 6
(United States) R Opelka | 6 | 7^{7}
WC | (United States) C Eubanks | 4 | 6^{3}
(Kazakhstan) A Bublik | 7^{7} | 6
(United States) B Klahn | 6^{5} | 3
WC | (United States) B Fratangelo | 6 | 6^{14} | 7^{7}
(Croatia) I Karlović | 4 | 7^{16} | 6^{5}

Second round
6 | (Croatia) M Čilić | 7^{7} | 7^{7}
(Romania) M Copil | 6^{4} | 6^{4}
(United States) R Opelka | 4 | 6 | 4
9 | (Canada) F Auger-Aliassime | 6 | 3 | 6
16 | (United States) F Tiafoe | 6 | 7^{7}
(Kazakhstan) A Bublik | 1 | 6^{5}
WC | (United States) B Fratangelo | 3 | 4
3 | (Russia) D Medvedev | 6 | 6

Third round
6 | (Croatia) M Čilić | 6 | 6
9 | (Canada) F Auger-Aliassime | 3 | 4
16 | (United States) F Tiafoe | 2 | 5
3 | (Russia) D Medvedev | 6 | 7

Quarterfinals
6 | (Croatia) M Čilić | 4 | 6^{7}
3 | (Russia) D Medvedev | 6 | 7^{9}

==== Section 4 ====
First round
(Australia) M Ebden | 4 | 4
Q | (United States) T Smyczek | 6 | 6
(Russia) A Rublev | 6^{6} | 6 | 6^{2}
LL | (Germany) P Gojowczyk | 7^{8} | 4 | 7^{7}
(South Africa) L Harris | 4 | 6 | 6
(Lithuania) R Berankis | 6 | 3 | 1
Q | (Canada) B Schnur | 4 | 6^{2}
(France) J-W Tsonga | 6 | 7^{7}

Second round
8 | (Canada) M Raonic | 6 | 6
Q | (United States) T Smyczek | 1 | 4
LL | (Germany) P Gojowczyk | 6 | 7^{8}
12 | (Australia) A de Minaur | 3 | 6^{6}
13 | (United Kingdom) K Edmund | 6 | 6
(South Africa) L Harris | 1 | 4
(France) J-W Tsonga | 6 | 2 | 7
2 | (Russia) K Khachanov | 4 | 6 | 5

Third round
8 | (Canada) M Raonic | 4 | 4
LL | (Germany) P Gojowczyk | 6 | 6
13 | (United Kingdom) K Edmund | 4 | 6 | 6
(France) J-W Tsonga | 6 | 3 | 4

Quarterfinals
LL | (Germany) P Gojowczyk | 6 | 4 | 6
13 | (United Kingdom) K Edmund | 3 | 6 | 3

== Qualifying ==
=== Seeds ===
1. (Canada) Brayden Schnur (qualified)
2. (Germany) Peter Gojowczyk (qualifying competition, lucky loser)
3. (Belarus) Ilya Ivashka (qualifying competition, lucky loser)
4. (Slovakia) Norbert Gombos (qualifying competition, lucky loser)
5. (Serbia) Viktor Troicki (qualifying competition)
6. (France) Nicolas Mahut (qualifying competition)
7. (United States) Michael Mmoh (first round)
8. (United States) Noah Rubin (first round)
9. (Denmark) Mikael Torpegaard (qualified)
10. (Australia) Marc Polmans (qualified)
11. (India) Ramkumar Ramanathan (first round)
12. (United States) Donald Young (qualified)

=== Qualifiers ===
1. (Canada) Brayden Schnur
2. (United States) Donald Young
3. (Denmark) Mikael Torpegaard
4. (United States) Tim Smyczek
5. (United States) Thai-Son Kwiatkowski
6. (Australia) Marc Polmans

=== Lucky losers ===
1. (Belarus) Ilya Ivashka
2. (Germany) Peter Gojowczyk
3. (Slovakia) Norbert Gombos

=== Qualifying draw ===
==== First qualifier ====
| First round | | | | Qualifying competition |
| | | | | 1 | (Canada) Brayden Schnur | 4 | 6 | 6 |
| | | | | | (France) Gleb Sakharov | 6 | 2 | 4 |
| | (France) Gleb Sakharov | 6 | 7^{7} | | (France) Gleb Sakharov | 6 | 2 | 4 |
| 7 | (United States) Michael Mmoh | 4 | 6^{3} |

==== Second qualifier ====
| First round | | | | Qualifying competition |
| | | | | 2 | (Germany) Peter Gojowczyk | 6 | 3 | 4 |
| | | | | 12 | (United States) Donald Young | 2 | 6 | 6 |
| WC | (United States) Nicholas Reyes | 2 | 0 | 12 | (United States) Donald Young | 2 | 6 | 6 |
| 12 | (United States) Donald Young | 6 | 6 |

==== Third qualifier ====
| First round | | | | | Qualifying competition |
| | | | | | 3 | (Belarus) Ilya Ivashka | 6 | 4 | 3 |
| | | | | | 9 | (Denmark) Mikael Torpegaard | 4 | 6 | 6 |
| Alt | (Canada) Alexis Galarneau | 4 | 6 | 4 | 9 | (Denmark) Mikael Torpegaard | 4 | 6 | 6 |
| 9 | (Denmark) Mikael Torpegaard | 6 | 2 | 6 |

==== Fourth qualifier ====
| First round | | | | Qualifying competition |
| | | | | 4 | (Slovakia) Norbert Gombos | 6^{5} | 7 | 3 |
| | | | | | (United States) Tim Smyczek | 7^{7} | 5 | 6 |
| | (United States) Tim Smyczek | 6 | 6 | | (United States) Tim Smyczek | 7^{7} | 5 | 6 |
| 11 | (India) Ramkumar Ramanathan | 4 | 2 |

==== Fifth qualifier ====
First round
5 | (Serbia) Viktor Troicki | 4 | 6 | 7
WC | (United States) Andrew Fenty | 6 | 1 | 5
(United States) Thai-Son Kwiatkowski | 7 | 4 | 6
8 | (United States) Noah Rubin | 5 | 6 | 1

Qualifying competition
5 | (Serbia) Viktor Troicki | 3 | 7^{7} | 4
(United States) Thai-Son Kwiatkowski | 6 | 6^{5} | 6

==== Sixth qualifier ====
First round
6 | (France) Nicolas Mahut | 6 | 6
WC | (United States) Robert Maciag | 1 | 3
Alt | (United States) James Cerretani | 0 | 3
10 | (Australia) Marc Polmans | 6 | 6

Qualifying competition
6 | (France) Nicolas Mahut | 7^{7} | 2 | 4
10 | (Australia) Marc Polmans | 6^{3} | 6 | 6
