= Kiranpal Pannu =

New Zealand tennis player

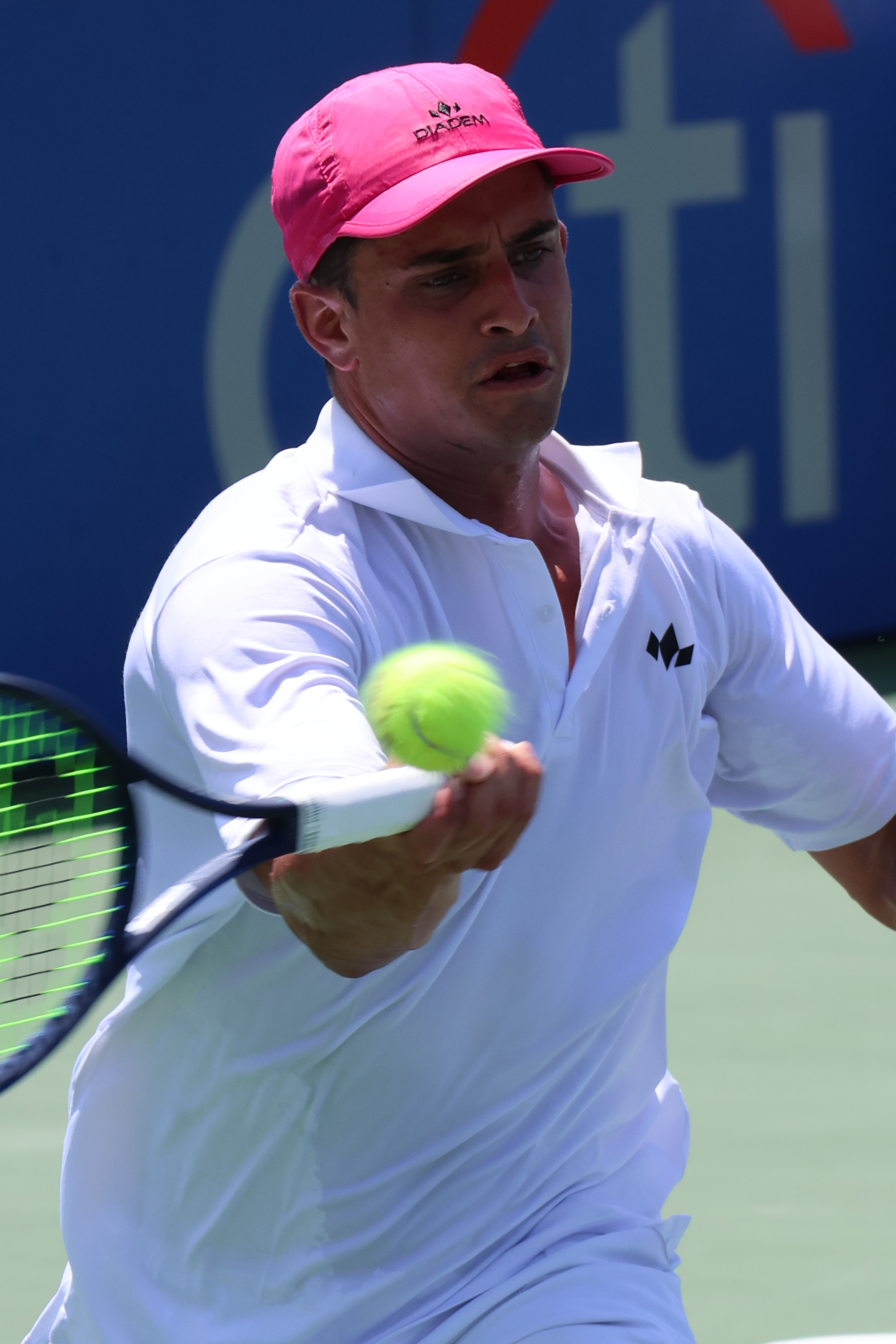
- Pannu at the 2023 DC Open
- Country (sports): New Zealand
- Born: 7 January 1997 (age 28) Wellington, New Zealand
- Height: 1.85 m (6 ft 1 in)
- Plays: Right-handed (two-handed backhand)
- Prize money: $83,299

Singles
- Career record: 1–6 (at ATP Tour level, Grand Slam level, and in Davis Cup)
- Career titles: 0
- Highest ranking: No. 447 (28 October 2024)
- Current ranking: No. 923 (15 October 2025)

Doubles
- Career record: 0–0
- Career titles: 0
- Highest ranking: No. 1016 (30 January 2023)
- Current ranking: No. 2192 (20 May 2024)
- Last updated on: 20 May 2024.

Kiranpal Pannu (born 7 January 1997) is a tennis player from New Zealand. Pannu has a career-high singles ranking by the Association of Tennis Professionals (ATP) of 559, achieved on 20 May 2024. On 30 January 2023, he peaked at No. 1016 in the ATP doubles rankings.

Pannu represents New Zealand in Davis Cup competitions, where he has a win-loss record of 0–1.

He made his ATP Tour debut 2023 in Auckland where he lost to Richard Gasquet in straight sets in the first round. He made headlines for highlighting the financial difficulties of playing tennis, revealing that he has struggled to continue his career without financial support from others.

Pannu played college tennis at Columbus State University.

== ATP Challenger and ITF World Tennis Tour finals ==
=== Singles: 4 (3 titles, 1 runner-up) ===
Legend ATP Challenger Tour (0–0) M25 ITF tournaments (0–1) M15 ITF tournaments (3–0)	Finals by surface Hard (3–0) Clay (0–1) Grass (0–0)

Result	W–L	Date	Tournament	Tier	Surface	Opponent	Score
Win	1–0	Dec 2022	Papamoa (Tauranga), New Zealand	M15	Hard	(Australia) Derek Pham	4–6, 6–2, 6–4
Loss	1–1	May 2024	Anapoima, Colombia	M25	Clay	(Colombia) Nicolás Mejía	2–6, 2–6
Win	2–1	May 2024	Kingston, Jamaica	M15	Hard	(India) Aryan Shah	6–1, 6–1
Win	3–1	Jun 2024	Santo Domingo, Dominican Republic	M15	Hard	(China) Fnu Nidunjianzan	6–4, 5–7, 7–6^{(7–2)}
