= 2006 in tennis =

This page covers all the important events in the sport of tennis in 2006. Primarily, it provides the results of notable tournaments throughout the year on both the ATP and WTA Tours, the Davis Cup, and the Fed Cup.

Roger Federer triumphed in four top tennis contests in 2006: Wimbledon, the Australian Open, the US Open, and the Tennis Masters Cup. Amélie Mauresmo won at Wimbledon and the Australian Open; while Justine Henin-Hardenne won the French Open and the WTA Tour Championships. Other champions that year included Rafael Nadal in the French Open, and Maria Sharapova in the US Open. In international team competitions, the Russian men's team beat Argentina to win the Davis Cup, and the Italian women's team beat Belgium to win the Fed Cup.

== ITF ==
=== Grand Slam events ===
- Australian Open (January 16 – January 29)
  - Men's Singles: (Switzerland) Roger Federer d. (Cyprus) Marcos Baghdatis, 5–7, 7–5, 6–0, 6–2.
  - Women's Singles: (France) Amélie Mauresmo d. (Belgium) Justine Henin-Hardenne, 6–1, 2–0, Henin-Hardenne retires.
  - Men's Doubles: (United States) Bob Bryan & (United States) Mike Bryan d. (Czech Republic) Martin Damm & (India) Leander Paes, 4–6, 6–3, 6–4.
  - Women's Doubles: (China) Zi Yan & (China) Jie Zheng d. (Australia) Samantha Stosur & (United States) Lisa Raymond, 2–6, 7–6^{(9–7)}, 6–3.
  - Mixed Doubles: (Switzerland) Martina Hingis & (India) Mahesh Bhupathi d. (Russia) Elena Likhovtseva & (Canada) Daniel Nestor, 6–3, 6–3.
- French Open (May 28 – June 11) – Details
  - Men's Singles: (Spain) Rafael Nadal d. (Switzerland) Roger Federer, 1–6, 6–1, 6–4, 7–6^{(7–4)}.
  - Women's Singles: (Belgium) Justine Henin-Hardenne d. (Russia) Svetlana Kuznetsova, 6–4, 6–4.
  - Men's Doubles: (Sweden) Jonas Björkman & (Belarus) Max Mirnyi d. (United States) Bob Bryan & (United States) Mike Bryan, 6–7^{(5–7)}, 6–4, 7–5.
  - Women's Doubles: (United States) Lisa Raymond & (Australia) Samantha Stosur d. (Slovakia) Daniela Hantuchová & (Japan) Ai Sugiyama, 6–3, 6–2.
  - Mixed Doubles: (Slovenia) Katarina Srebotnik & (Serbia) Nenad Zimonjić d. (Russia) Elena Likhovtseva & (Canada) Daniel Nestor, 6–3, 6–4.
- Wimbledon – Details
  - Men's Singles: (Switzerland) Roger Federer d. (Spain) Rafael Nadal, 6–0, 7–6^{(7–5)}, 6–7^{(2–7)}, 6–3.
  - Women's Singles: (France) Amélie Mauresmo d. (Belgium) Justine Henin-Hardenne, 2–6, 6–3, 6–4.
  - Men's Doubles: (United States) Bob Bryan & (United States) Mike Bryan† d. (France) Fabrice Santoro & (Serbia) Nenad Zimonjić, 6–3, 4–6, 6–4, 6–2.
  - Women's Doubles: (China) Zi Yan & (China) Jie Zheng d. (Spain) Virginia Ruano Pascual & (Argentina) Paola Suárez, 6–3, 3–6, 6–2.
  - Mixed Doubles: (Russia) Vera Zvonareva & (Israel) Andy Ram d. (United States) Venus Williams & (United States) Bob Bryan, 6–3, 6–2.
- U.S. Open
  - Men's Singles: (Switzerland) Roger Federer d. (United States) Andy Roddick, 6–2, 4–6, 7–5, 6–1.
  - Women's Singles: (Russia) Maria Sharapova d. (Belgium) Justine Henin-Hardenne, 6–4, 6–4.
  - Men's Doubles: (Czech Republic) Martin Damm & (India) Leander Paes d. (Sweden) Jonas Björkman & (Belarus) Max Mirnyi, 6–7^{(5–7)}, 6–4, 6–3.
  - Women's Doubles: (France) Nathalie Dechy & (Russia) Vera Zvonareva d. (Russia) Dinara Safina & (Slovenia) Katarina Srebotnik, 7–6^{(7–5)}, 7–5.
  - Mixed Doubles: (United States) Martina Navratilova & (United States) Bob Bryan d. (Czech Republic) Květa Peschke & (Czech Republic) Martin Damm, 6–2, 6–3.

=== Davis Cup ===
World Group Draw

- S-Seeded
- U-Unseeded
- *Choice of ground

Round One
S	Croatia	3
U	Austria*	2
S	Argentina*	5
U	Sweden	0
S	Spain	1
U	Belarus*	4
S	Australia	3
U	Switzerland*	2
U	Germany*	2
S	France	3
U	Netherlands*	0
S	Russia	5
U	Romania	1
S	United States*	4
U	Chile*	4
S	Slovakia	1

Quarterfinals
S	Croatia*	2
S	Argentina	3
U	Belarus	0
S	Australia*	5
S	France*	1
S	Russia	4
S	United States*	3
U	Chile	2

Semifinals
S	Argentina*	5
S	Australia	0
S	Russia*	3
S	United States	2

Final
S	Argentina	2
S	Russia*	3

World Group Playoffs

Date: 22 Sep – 24 Sep

Venue	Winner	Score	Loser
Portschach, Austria	Austria	5–0	Mexico
Düsseldorf, Germany	Germany	4–1	Thailand
Leiden, Netherlands	Czech Republic	4–1	Netherlands
Bucharest, Romania	Romania	4–1	(South Korea) Korea Republic
Bratislava, Slovakia	Belgium	3–2	Slovakia
Santander, Spain	Spain	4–1	Italy
Belo Horizonte, Brazil	Sweden	3–1	Brazil
Geneva, Switzerland	Switzerland	4–1	Serbia and Montenegro

=== Fed Cup ===
World Group I Draw

- S-Seeded
- U-Unseeded
- *Choice of ground

Quarterfinals
S	France*	1
U	Italy	4
S	Spain*	5
U	Austria	0
U	Germany*	2
S	United States	3
U	Belgium*	3
S	Russia	2

Semifinals
U	Italy	3
S	Spain*	1
S	United States	0
U	Belgium*	4

Final
U	Italy	3
U	Belgium	2

=== Hopman Cup ===
- Final: USA d. Netherlands, 2–1.
  - Team USA: Lisa Raymond & Taylor Dent
  - Team Netherlands: Michaëlla Krajicek & Peter Wessels

== ATP ==
- 2006 ATP calendar

=== Tennis Masters Cup ===
- Shanghai, People's Republic of China, indoor taraflex (November 11 – 18)
  - Singles: (Switzerland) Roger Federer d. (United States) James Blake, 6–0, 6–3, 6–4.
  - Doubles: (Sweden) Jonas Björkman & (Belarus) Max Mirnyi d. (The Bahamas) Mark Knowles & (Canada) Daniel Nestor, 6–2, 6–4.

=== ATP Masters Series ===
- Indian Wells, outdoor hardcourt (March 10 – 19)
  - Singles: (Switzerland) Roger Federer d. (United States) James Blake, 7–5, 6–3, 6–0.
  - Doubles: (The Bahamas) Mark Knowles & (Canada) Daniel Nestor d. (United States) Bob Bryan & (United States) Mike Bryan, 6–4, 6–4.
- Miami, outdoor hardcourt (March 23 – April 2)
  - Singles: (Switzerland) Roger Federer d. (Croatia) Ivan Ljubičić, 7–6^{(7–5)}, 7–6^{(7–4)}, 7–6^{(8–6)}.
  - Doubles: (Sweden) Jonas Björkman & (Belarus) Max Mirnyi d. (United States) Bob Bryan & (United States) Mike Bryan, 6–4, 6–4.
- Monte Carlo, outdoor clay (April 17 – 23)
  - Singles: (Spain) Rafael Nadal d. (Switzerland) Roger Federer, 6–2, 6–7^{(2–7)}, 6–3, 7–6^{(7–5)}.
  - Doubles: (Sweden) Jonas Björkman & (Belarus) Max Mirnyi d. (France) Fabrice Santoro & (Serbia) Nenad Zimonjić, 6–2, 7–6.
- Rome, outdoor clay (May 8–14)
  - Singles: (Spain) Rafael Nadal d. (Switzerland) Roger Federer, 6–7^{(0–7)}, 7–6^{(7–5)}, 6–3, 2–6, 7–6^{(7–5)}.
  - Doubles: (The Bahamas) Mark Knowles & (Canada) Daniel Nestor d. (Israel) Jonathan Erlich & (Israel) Andy Ram, 6–4, 5–7, 13–11 (Match TB).
- Hamburg, outdoor clay (May 15–20)
  - Singles: (Spain) Tommy Robredo d. (Czech Republic) Radek Štěpánek, 6–1, 6–3, 6–3.
  - Doubles: (Australia) Paul Hanley & (Zimbabwe) Kevin Ullyett d. (The Bahamas) Mark Knowles & (Canada) Daniel Nestor, 6–2, 7–6^{(10–8)}.
- Toronto, outdoor hardcourt (August 7–13)
  - Singles: (Switzerland) Roger Federer d. (France) Richard Gasquet, 2–6, 6–3, 6–2.
  - Doubles: (United States) Bob Bryan & (United States) Mike Bryan d. (Australia) Paul Hanley & (Zimbabwe) Kevin Ullyett, 6–3, 7–5.
- Cincinnati, outdoor hardcourt (August 14 – 20)
  - Singles: (United States) Andy Roddick d. (Spain) Juan Carlos Ferrero, 6–3, 6–4.
  - Doubles: (Sweden) Jonas Björkman & (Belarus) Max Mirnyi d. (United States) Bob Bryan & (United States) Mike Bryan, 3–6, 6–3, 10–7 (Match TB).
- Madrid, indoor greenset (October 16–22)
  - Singles: (Switzerland) Roger Federer d. (Chile) Fernando González, 7–5, 6–1, 6–0.
  - Doubles: (United States) Bob Bryan & (United States) Mike Bryan d. (The Bahamas) Mark Knowles & (Canada) Daniel Nestor, 7–5, 6–4.
- Paris, indoor carpet (October 30 – November 5)
  - Singles: (Russia) Nikolay Davydenko d. (Slovenia) Dominik Hrbatý, 6–1, 6–2, 6–2.
  - Doubles: (France) Arnaud Clément & (France) Michaël Llodra d. (France) Fabrice Santoro & (Serbia) Nenad Zimonjić, 7–6^{(7–4)}, 6–2.

=== ARAG ATP World Team Cup ===
(May 21 – May 27)

- TP: Ties Played
- TW: Ties Won
- MW: Matches Won
- SW: Sets Won

Red Group	TP	TW	MW	SW
Germany	3	3	6	15
Czech Republic	3	2	5	14
Argentina	3	1	4	8
Italy	3	0	3	6

Blue Group	TP	TW	MW	SW
Croatia	3	3	8	15
Chile	3	2	4	10
Spain	3	1	3	10
United States	3	0	3	7

- Final: Croatia d. Germany, 2–0.
  - Team Croatia: Mario Ančić, Ivan Ljubičić, Ivo Karlović
  - Team Germany: Nicolas Kiefer, Alexander Waske

== Sony Ericsson WTA Tour ==
- 2006 WTA calendar

=== Sony Ericsson WTA Tour Championships ===
==== Women's singles ====
Championship	Champion	Finalist	Score in the final
Madrid	(Belgium) Justine Henin-Hardenne	(France) Amélie Mauresmo	6–4, 6–3

==== Women's doubles ====
Championship	Champion	Finalist	Score in the final
Madrid	(United States) Lisa Raymond (Australia) Samantha Stosur	(Zimbabwe) Cara Black (Australia) Rennae Stubbs	3–6, 6–3, 6–3

=== WTA Tier I ===
- Tokyo, Japan: Toray Pan Pacific Open, indoor carpet
  - Singles: (Russia) Elena Dementieva d. (Switzerland) Martina Hingis, 6–2, 6–0.
  - Doubles: (United States) Lisa Raymond & (Australia) Samantha Stosur d. (Zimbabwe) Cara Black & (Australia) Rennae Stubbs, 6–2, 6–1.
- Indian Wells, USA: Pacific Life Open, outdoor hardcourt (March 10 – March 19)
  - Singles: (Russia) Maria Sharapova d. (Russia) Elena Dementieva, 6–1, 6–2.
  - Doubles: (United States) Lisa Raymond & (Australia) Samantha Stosur d. (Spain) Virginia Ruano Pascual & (United States) Meghann Shaughnessy, 6–2, 7–5.
- Miami, USA: NASDAQ-100 Open, outdoor hardcourt (March 23 – April 2)
  - Singles: (Russia) Svetlana Kuznetsova d. (Russia) Maria Sharapova, 6–4, 6–3.
  - Doubles: (United States) Lisa Raymond & (Australia) Samantha Stosur d. (South Africa) Liezel Huber & (United States) Martina Navratilova, 6–4, 7–5.
- Charleston, USA: Family Circle Cup, outdoor clay (April 10 – April 16)
  - Singles: (Russia) Nadia Petrova d. (Switzerland) Patty Schnyder, 6–3, 4–6, 6–3.
  - Doubles: (United States) Lisa Raymond & (Australia) Samantha Stosur d. (Spain) Virginia Ruano Pascual & (United States) Meghann Shaughnessy, 3–6, 6–1, 6–1.
- Berlin, Germany: Qatar Total German Open, outdoor clay
  - Singles: (Russia) Nadia Petrova d. (Belgium) Justine Henin-Hardenne, 4–6, 6–4, 7–5.
  - Doubles: (China) Zi Yan & (China) Jie Zheng d. (Russia) Elena Dementieva & (Italy) Flavia Pennetta, 6–2, 6–3.
- Rome, Italy: Campionati Internazionali d'Italia, outdoor clay
  - Singles: (Switzerland) Martina Hingis d. (Russia) Dinara Safina, 6–2, 7–5.
  - Doubles: (Slovakia) Daniela Hantuchová & (Japan) Ai Sugiyama d. (Czech Republic) Květa Peschke & (Italy) Francesca Schiavone, 3–6, 6–3, 6–1.
- San Diego, USA: Acura Classic, outdoor hardcourt
  - Singles: (Russia) Maria Sharapova d. (Belgium) Kim Clijsters, 7–5, 7–5.
  - Doubles: (South Africa) Cara Black & (Australia) Rennae Stubbs d. (Germany) Anna-Lena Grönefeld & (United States) Meghann Shaughnessy, 6–2, 6–2.
- Montreal, Canada: Rogers Cup presented by National Bank, outdoor hardcourt
  - Singles: (Serbia) Ana Ivanovic d. (Switzerland) Martina Hingis, 6–2, 6–3.
  - Doubles: (United States) Martina Navratilova & (Russia) Nadia Petrova d. (Zimbabwe) Cara Black & (Germany) Anna-Lena Grönefeld, 6–1, 6–2.
- Moscow, Russia: Kremlin Cup, indoor supreme
  - Singles: (Russia) Anna Chakvetadze d. (Russia) Nadia Petrova, 6–4, 6–4.
  - Doubles: (Czech Republic) Květa Peschke & (Italy) Francesca Schiavone d. (Czech Republic) Iveta Benešová & (Russia) Galina Voskoboeva, 6–4, 6–7^{(4–7)}, 6–1.
- Zürich, Switzerland: Zurich Open
  - Singles: (Russia) Maria Sharapova d. (Slovakia) Daniela Hantuchová, 6–1, 4–6, 6–3.
  - Doubles: (Zimbabwe) Cara Black & (Australia) Rennae Stubbs d. (South Africa) Liezel Huber & (Slovenia) Katarina Srebotnik, 7–5, 7–5.

== Retired ==
- September 3: Andre Agassi (United States)

== Tennis Hall of Fame ==
Class	Inductees	Category
Class of 2006	(Italy) Gianni Clerici	Contributor
Class of 2006	(Australia) Pat Rafter	Player
Class of 2006	(Argentina) Gabriela Sabatini	Player
Class of 2006	(Australia) Nancye Wynne Bolton	Player
