= 2023 Mubadala Citi DC Open – Women's singles =

Women's singles
- 2023 Mubadala Citi DC Open

Final
- Champion: (United States) Coco Gauff
- Runner-up: (Greece) Maria Sakkari
- Score: 6–2, 6–3

Details
- Draw: 28 (4Q / 4WC)
- Seeds: 8

Events
Singles	men	women
Doubles	men	women
← 2022 ·	Washington Open	· 2024 →

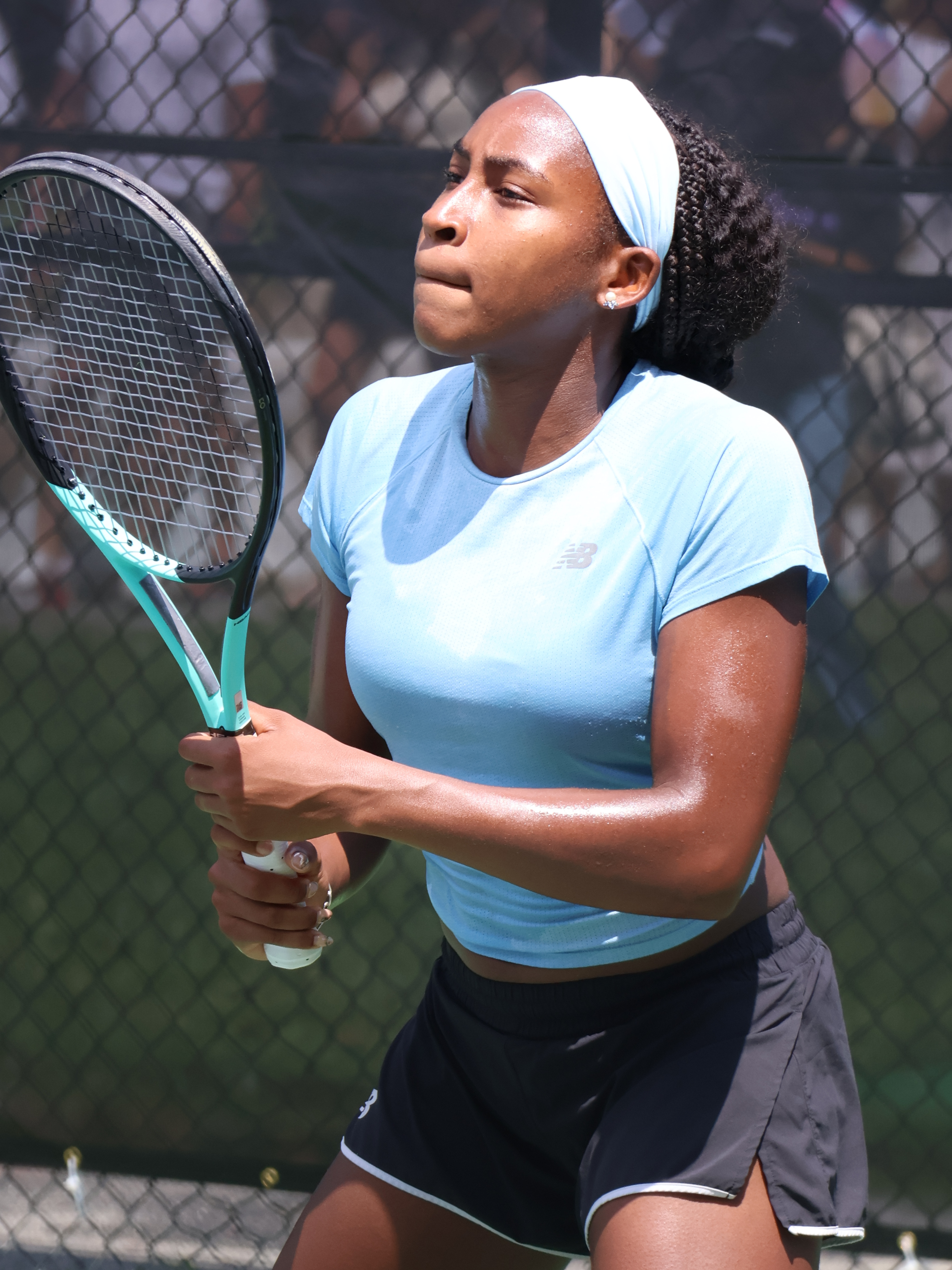
Coco Gauff (pictured at practice) won her first WTA 500 singles title.

Coco Gauff defeated Maria Sakkari in the final, 6–2, 6–3 to win the women's singles tennis title at the 2023 Washington Open. She did not lose a set en route to her fourth WTA Tour singles title. Gauff became the youngest person to win the WTA 500 title since its reorganization in 2021.

Liudmila Samsonova was the defending champion, from when the event was at the WTA 250 level, but lost in the semifinals to Gauff.

== Seeds ==
The top four seeds received a bye into the second round.

1. (United States) Jessica Pegula (semifinals)
2. (France) Caroline Garcia (second round)
3. (United States) Coco Gauff (champion)
4. (Greece) Maria Sakkari (final)
5. Daria Kasatkina (second round)
6. (Switzerland) Belinda Bencic (quarterfinals)
7. (United States) Madison Keys (quarterfinals)
8. Liudmila Samsonova (semifinals)

== Draw ==
=== Key ===
- Q = Qualifier
- WC = Wild card
- LL = Lucky loser
- Alt = Alternate
- SE = Special exempt
- PR = Protected ranking
- ITF = ITF entry
- JE = Junior exempt
- w/o = Walkover
- r = Retired
- d = Defaulted
- SR = Special ranking

=== Finals ===
Semifinals
1	(United States) Jessica Pegula	3	6	2
4	(Greece) Maria Sakkari	6	4	6
3	(United States) Coco Gauff	6	6
8	Liudmila Samsonova	3	3

Final
4	(Greece) Maria Sakkari	2	3
3	(United States) Coco Gauff	6	6

=== Top half ===
First round
LL	(United States) P Stearns	6	6
Q	(Poland) M Fręch	1	4
WC	(Ukraine) E Svitolina	7^{7}	6
V Azarenka	6^{2}	4
(Belgium) E Mertens	3	5
5	D Kasatkina	6	7
(United States) B Pera	3	5
Q	(Canada) L Fernandez	6	7
PR	(United States) J Brady	6	6
(Ukraine) A Kalinina	2	1
(China) Q Zheng	5	1
7	(United States) M Keys	7	6

Second round
1	(United States) J Pegula	6	6
LL	(United States) P Stearns	3	4
WC	(Ukraine) E Svitolina	6	6
5	D Kasatkina	2	2
4	(Greece) M Sakkari	7	6
Q	(Canada) L Fernandez	5	2
PR	(United States) J Brady	4	0
7	(United States) M Keys	6	6

Quarterfinals
1	(United States) J Pegula	4	6	6
WC	(Ukraine) E Svitolina	6	3	4
4	(Greece) M Sakkari	6	6
7	(United States) M Keys	3	3

Semifinals
1	(United States) J Pegula	3	6	2
4	(Greece) M Sakkari	6	4	6

=== Bottom half ===
First round
6	(Switzerland) B Bencic	6
A Potapova	5^{r}
(United States) S Stephens	6^{8}	6	1
Q	(United States) L Davis	7^{10}	3	6
Q	(United States) H Baptiste	6	0	6
(Czech Republic) Ka Plíšková	1	6	3
8	L Samsonova	6	6
WC	(United States) D Collins	1	3
(Romania) S Cîrstea	6	7^{15}
(Croatia) P Martić	3	6^{13}
WC	(Canada) B Andreescu	6	3	6^{5}
(Ukraine) M Kostyuk	2	6	7^{7}

Second round
6	(Switzerland) B Bencic	6	6
Q	(United States) L Davis	1	4
Q	(United States) H Baptiste	1	4
3	(United States) C Gauff	6	6
8	L Samsonova	6	6
(Romania) S Cîrstea	1	3
(Ukraine) M Kostyuk	6	6
2	(France) C Garcia	2	3

Quarterfinals
6	(Switzerland) B Bencic	1	2
3	(United States) C Gauff	6	6
8	L Samsonova	6	6
(Ukraine) M Kostyuk	4	2

Semifinals
3	(United States) C Gauff	6	6
8	L Samsonova	3	3

== Qualifying ==
=== Seeds ===
1. Anna Blinkova (first round)
2. (France) Varvara Gracheva (first round)
3. (United States) Alycia Parks (first round)
4. (United States) Lauren Davis (qualified)
5. (United States) Peyton Stearns (qualifying competition, lucky loser)
6. (United Kingdom) Katie Boulter (qualifying competition)
7. (Poland) Magdalena Fręch (qualified)
8. (Sweden) Rebecca Peterson (first round)

=== Qualifiers ===
1. (Poland) Magdalena Fręch
2. (Canada) Leylah Fernandez
3. (United States) Hailey Baptiste
4. (United States) Lauren Davis

=== Lucky loser ===
1. (United States) Peyton Stearns

=== Qualifying draw ===
==== First qualifier ====
First round
1	Anna Blinkova	3	2
WC	(United States) Clervie Ngounoue	6	6
(United States) Kayla Day	2	0^{r}
7	(Poland) Magdalena Fręch	6	0

Qualifying competition
WC	(United States) Clervie Ngounoue	6^{2}	5
7	(Poland) Magdalena Fręch	7^{7}	7

==== Second qualifier ====
First round
2	(France) Varvara Gracheva	4	3
(Canada) Leylah Fernandez	6	6
(United States) Elizabeth Mandlik	5	3
6	(United Kingdom) Katie Boulter	7	6

Qualifying competition
(Canada) Leylah Fernandez	6	6
6	(United Kingdom) Katie Boulter	4	1

==== Third qualifier ====
First round
3	(United States) Alycia Parks	3	1
(United States) Hailey Baptiste	6	6
Iryna Shymanovich	6^{4}	5
5	(United States) Peyton Stearns	7^{7}	7

Qualifying competition
(United States) Hailey Baptiste	7^{7}	6
5	(United States) Peyton Stearns	6^{5}	2

==== Fourth qualifier ====
First round
4	(United States) Lauren Davis	4	6	6
WC	(United States) Alana Smith	6	3	2
(United States) Ashlyn Krueger	6	3	7^{7}
8	(Sweden) Rebecca Peterson	3	6	6^{5}

Qualifying competition
4	(United States) Lauren Davis	1	6	7
(United States) Ashlyn Krueger	6	3	5
