= 2023 Mubadala Citi DC Open =

Sports tournament

- Date: July 30 – August 6
- Edition: 54th (men); 11th (women)
- Category: ATP 500 (men); WTA 500 (women)
- Draw: 48S/16D (men); 32S/16D (women)
- Prize money: $2,013,940 (men) $780,637 (women)
- Surface: Hard (outdoor); SportMaster Sport Surfaces
- Location: Washington, D.C., United States
- Venue: William H.G. FitzGerald Tennis Center

Champions

Men's singles
- (United Kingdom) Dan Evans

Women's singles
- (United States) Coco Gauff

Men's doubles
- (Argentina) Máximo González / (Argentina) Andrés Molteni

Women's doubles
- (Germany) Laura Siegemund / Vera Zvonareva
- Washington Open

The 2023 Washington Open (called the Mubadala Citi DC Open for sponsorship reasons) was a tennis tournament played on outdoor hard courts. It was the 54th edition of the Washington Open for the men, and the 11th edition for the women. The event was part of the ATP Tour 500 series of the 2023 ATP Tour and a WTA 500 tournament on the 2023 WTA Tour (upgraded from WTA 250 status in 2022). The women's tournament was merged from the previous WTA 500 tournament in the Silicon Valley in the last two years. The Washington Open took place at the William H.G. FitzGerald Tennis Center in Washington, D.C., United States, from July 30 through August 6, 2023. Dan Evans and Coco Gauff won the singles titles.

== Finals ==
=== Men's singles ===
- (United Kingdom) Dan Evans defeated (Netherlands) Tallon Griekspoor, 7–5, 6–3

=== Women's singles ===
- (United States) Coco Gauff defeated (Greece) Maria Sakkari, 6–2, 6–3

=== Men's doubles ===
- (Argentina) Máximo González / (Argentina) Andrés Molteni defeated (United States) Mackenzie McDonald / (United States) Ben Shelton, 6–7^{(4–7)}, 6–2, [10–8]

=== Women's doubles ===
- (Germany) Laura Siegemund / Vera Zvonareva defeated (Chile) Alexa Guarachi / (Romania) Monica Niculescu 6–4, 6–4

== Points and prize money ==
=== Point distribution ===
Event	W	F	SF	QF	Round of 16	Round of 32	Round of 64	Q	Q2	Q1
Men's singles	500	300	180	90	45	20	0	10	4	0
Men's doubles	500	300	180	90	0	—N/a	—N/a	45	25	0
Women's singles	470	305	185	100	55	1	—N/a	25	13	1
Women's doubles	470	305	185	100	1	—N/a	—N/a	—N/a	—N/a	—N/a

=== Prize money ===
Event	W	F	SF	QF	Round of 16	Round of 32	Round of 64	Q2	Q1
Men's singles	$353,455	$188,505	$97,785	$51,055	$26,905	$14,725	$7,855	$4,125	$2,355
Men's doubles*	$123,770	$65,980	$33,380	$16,690	$8,640	—N/a	—N/a	—N/a	—N/a
Women's singles	$120,150	$74,161	$43,323	$22,800	$11,600	$8,320	—N/a	$6,830	$4,090
Women's doubles*	$40,100	$24,300	$13,900	$7,200	$4,350	—N/a	—N/a	—N/a	—N/a

_{*per team}

== ATP singles main draw entrants ==
=== Seeds ===
Country	Player	Rank^{†}	Seed
USA	Taylor Fritz	9	1
USA	Frances Tiafoe	10	2
CAN	Félix Auger-Aliassime	12	3
POL	Hubert Hurkacz	16	4
BUL	Grigor Dimitrov	20	5
KAZ	Alexander Bublik	26	6
FRA	Adrian Mannarino	27	7
USA	Sebastian Korda	28	8
GBR	Dan Evans	30	9
JPN	Yoshihito Nishioka	31	10
USA	Christopher Eubanks	32	11
NED	Tallon Griekspoor	36	12
FRA	Ugo Humbert	38	13
USA	Ben Shelton	41	14
GBR	Andy Murray	42	15
USA	J. J. Wolf	46	16

^{†} Rankings are as of 24 July 2023.

=== Other entrants ===
The following players received wildcard entry into the singles main draw :

- (South Africa) Kevin Anderson
- (France) Gaël Monfils
- ~~(Japan) Kei Nishikori~~
- (United States) Ben Shelton

The following player received entry using a protected ranking:

- (South Africa) Lloyd Harris

The following players received entry from the qualifying draw:

- (United States) Bjorn Fratangelo
- (United States) Bradley Klahn
- (Japan) Shintaro Mochizuki
- (New Zealand) Kiranpal Pannu
- (China) Shang Juncheng
- (United States) Zachary Svajda

The following player received entry as a lucky loser:

- (Japan) Sho Shimabukuro

=== Withdrawals ===
- (France) Jérémy Chardy → replaced by Alexander Shevchenko
- (Australia) Nick Kyrgios → replaced by (United States) Michael Mmoh
- Daniil Medvedev → replaced by (Japan) Yosuke Watanuki
- (Japan) Kei Nishikori → replaced by (Japan) Sho Shimabukuro
- (Canada) Denis Shapovalov → replaced by (Moldova) Radu Albot
- (Sweden) Mikael Ymer → replaced by (Japan) Taro Daniel

== ATP doubles main draw entrants ==
=== Seeds ===
Country	Player	Country	Player	Rank^{†}	Seed
USA	Rajeev Ram	GBR	Joe Salisbury	11	1
USA	Austin Krajicek	CRO	Mate Pavić	23	2
GBR	Lloyd Glasspool	FIN	Harri Heliövaara	33	3
ESA	Marcelo Arévalo	NED	Jean-Julien Rojer	36	4

^{†} Rankings are as of 24 July 2023.

=== Other entrants ===
The following pairs received wildcard entry into the doubles main draw :

- (United Kingdom) Dan Evans / (United Kingdom) Andy Murray
- (United States) Mackenzie McDonald / (United States) Ben Shelton

The following pair received entry from the qualifying draw:

- (Kazakhstan) Alexander Bublik / (Netherlands) Tallon Griekspoor

=== Withdrawals ===
- (Netherlands) Wesley Koolhof / (United Kingdom) Neal Skupski → replaced by (Bulgaria) Grigor Dimitrov / (France) Nicolas Mahut

== WTA singles main draw entrants ==
=== Seeds ===
Country	Player	Rank^{†}	Seed
USA	Jessica Pegula	4	1
FRA	Caroline Garcia	5	2
USA	Coco Gauff	7	3
GRE	Maria Sakkari	9	4
	Daria Kasatkina	11	5
SUI	Belinda Bencic	15	6
USA	Madison Keys	16	7
	Liudmila Samsonova	17	8

^{†} Rankings are as of 24 July 2023.

=== Other entrants ===
The following players received wildcard entry into the main draw :

- (Canada) Bianca Andreescu
- (United States) Danielle Collins
- ~~(United States) Sofia Kenin~~
- (Ukraine) Elina Svitolina

The following player received entry using a protected ranking:

- (United States) Jennifer Brady

The following players received entry from the qualifying draw:

- (United States) Hailey Baptiste
- (United States) Lauren Davis
- (Canada) Leylah Fernandez
- (Poland) Magdalena Fręch

The following player received entry as a lucky loser:

- (United States) Peyton Stearns

=== Withdrawals ===
- (Spain) Paula Badosa → replaced by (Romania) Sorana Cîrstea
- (United States) Sofia Kenin → replaced by (United States) Peyton Stearns
- Veronika Kudermetova → replaced by (United States) Sloane Stephens

== WTA doubles main draw entrants ==
=== Seeds ===
Country	Player	Country	Player	Rank^{†}	Seed
USA	Nicole Melichar-Martinez	AUS	Ellen Perez	17	1
JPN	Shuko Aoyama	CAN	Gabriela Dabrowski	38	2
TPE	Chan Hao-ching	MEX	Giuliana Olmos	40	3
JPN	Miyu Kato	INA	Aldila Sutjiadi	69	4

^{†} Rankings are as of 24 July 2023.

=== Other entrants ===
The following pairs received wildcard entry into the doubles main draw :

- (United States) Hailey Baptiste / (United States) Sloane Stephens
- ~~(United States) Clervie Ngounoue / (United States) Alycia Parks~~

=== Withdrawals ===
- (United States) Clervie Ngounoue / (United States) Alycia Parks → replaced by (Japan) Makoto Ninomiya / (United States) Sabrina Santamaria
