= 2023 Tennis in the Land =

- Date: 20–26 August
- Edition: 3rd
- Category: WTA 250
- Draw: 32S / 16D
- Prize money: $271,363
- Surface: Hard / outdoor
- Location: Cleveland, United States
- Venue: Jacobs Pavilion

Champions

Singles
- (Spain) Sara Sorribes Tormo

Doubles
- (Japan) Miyu Kato / (Indonesia) Aldila Sutjiadi
- Tennis in the Land

The 2023 Tennis in the Land event was a professional women's tennis tournament played on outdoor hard courts at Topnotch Stadium, a temporary tennis-specific stadium built in The Flats in Cleveland, Ohio. It was the third edition of the tournament and part of the WTA 250 category of the 2023 WTA Tour.

== Champions ==
=== Singles ===
- (Spain) Sara Sorribes Tormo def. Ekaterina Alexandrova, 3–6, 6–4, 6–4.

This was Sorribes Tormo's second WTA Tour singles title, and first of the year.

=== Doubles ===
- (Japan) Miyu Kato / (Indonesia) Aldila Sutjiadi def. (United States) Nicole Melichar-Martinez / (Australia) Ellen Perez, 6–4, 6–7^{(4–7)}, [10–8]

== Points and prize money ==
=== Point distribution ===
Event	W	F	SF	QF	Round of 16	Round of 32	Q	Q2	Q1
Women's singles	280	180	110	60	30	1	18	12	1
Women's doubles	280	180	110	60	1	—N/a	—N/a	—N/a	—N/a

=== Prize money ===
Event	W	F	SF	QF	Round of 16	Round of 32^{1}	Q2	Q1
Women's singles	$34,228	$20,226	$11,275	$6,417	$4,220	$2,930	$2,400	$1,815
Women's doubles*	$12,447	$7,000	$4,020	$2,400	$1,848	—N/a	—N/a	—N/a

_{^{1}Qualifiers prize money is also the Round of 32 prize money.}
_{*per team}

== Singles main-draw entrants ==
=== Seeds ===
Country	Player	Rank^{1}	Seed
FRA	Caroline Garcia	6	1
CZE	Barbora Krejčíková	11	2
	Veronika Kudermetova	16	3
	Ekaterina Alexandrova	21	4
UKR	Anhelina Kalinina	28	5
~~ITA~~	~~Elisabetta Cocciaretto~~	~~30~~	~~6~~
~~EGY~~	~~Mayar Sherif~~	~~33~~	~~7~~
	Anna Blinkova	37	8
USA	Sloane Stephens	38	9
~~ROU~~	~~Irina-Camelia Begu~~	~~39~~	~~10~~
ITA	Jasmine Paolini	41	11

- Rankings are as of 14 August 2023.

=== Other entrants ===
The following players received wildcards into the main draw:

- (Canada) Leylah Fernandez
- (France) Caroline Garcia
- Veronika Kudermetova
- ~~(United States) Venus Williams~~

The following player received entry as an alternate using a protected ranking:

- (Romania) Patricia Maria Țig

The following players received entry from the qualifying draw:

- (France) Clara Burel
- (Poland) Magdalena Fręch
- (Argentina) Nadia Podoroska
- Aliaksandra Sasnovich
- (China) Wang Xinyu
- (China) Wang Xiyu

The following players received entry as lucky losers:

- (Germany) Tamara Korpatsch
- (Spain) Sara Sorribes Tormo
- (Denmark) Clara Tauson
- (Italy) Martina Trevisan

=== Withdrawals ===
- (Spain) Paula Badosa → replaced by (Austria) Julia Grabher
- (Romania) Irina-Camelia Begu → replaced by (Italy) Martina Trevisan
- (Italy) Elisabetta Cocciaretto → replaced by (Germany) Tamara Korpatsch
- Liudmila Samsonova → replaced by (Czech Republic) Linda Nosková
- (Egypt) Mayar Sherif → replaced by (Denmark) Clara Tauson
- (United States) Venus Williams → replaced by (Spain) Sara Sorribes Tormo
- (China) Zhang Shuai → replaced by (Romania) Patricia Maria Țig

== Doubles main-draw entrants ==
=== Seeds ===
Country	Player	Country	Player	Rank^{1}	Seed
CZE	Barbora Krejčíková	CZE	Kateřina Siniaková	3	1
USA	Nicole Melichar-Martinez	AUS	Ellen Perez	23	2
JPN	Shuko Aoyama	JPN	Ena Shibahara	28	3
KAZ	Anna Danilina	TPE	Hsieh Su-wei	36	4

- Rankings are as of 14 August 2023.

=== Other entrants ===
The following pairs received wildcards into the doubles main draw:

- Ekaterina Alexandrova / Aliaksandra Sasnovich
- (United States) Dalayna Hewitt / (United States) Jamie Loeb
