= 2012 Challenger Banque Nationale de Granby =

- Date: July 16 – July 22
- Edition: 19th (men); 2nd (women)
- Category: ATP Challenger Tour; ITF Women's Circuit
- Prize money: US$50,000+H (men); US$25,000 (women)
- Surface: Hard – outdoors
- Location: Granby, Quebec, Canada
- Venue: Club de tennis des Loisirs de Granby

Champions

Men's singles
- (Canada) Vasek Pospisil

Women's singles
- (Canada) Eugenie Bouchard

Men's doubles
- (Canada) Philip Bester / (Canada) Vasek Pospisil

Women's doubles
- (Canada) Sharon Fichman / (Canada) Marie-Ève Pelletier
← 2011 ·	Challenger de Granby	· 2013 →

The 2012 Challenger Banque Nationale de Granby was a professional tennis tournament played on outdoor hard courts. It was the 19th edition, for men, and 2nd edition, for women, of the tournament and part of the 2012 ATP Challenger Tour and the 2012 ITF Women's Circuit, offering totals of $50,000, for men, and $25,000, for women, in prize money. It took place in Granby, Quebec, Canada between July 16 and July 22, 2012.

== Men's singles main-draw entrants ==
=== Seeds ===
Country	Player	Rank^{1}	Seed
CAN	Vasek Pospisil	105	1
NED	Igor Sijsling	110	2
CAN	Frank Dancevic	132	3
THA	Danai Udomchoke	165	4
BEL	Maxime Authom	179	5
AUS	James Duckworth	192	6
CAN	Érik Chvojka	224	7
ITA	Thomas Fabbiano	234	8

- ^{1} Rankings are as of July 9, 2012

=== Other entrants ===
The following players received wildcards into the singles main draw:

- (Canada) Philip Bester
- (Canada) Frank Dancevic
- (Canada) Pavel Krainik
- (Canada) Samuel Monette

The following players received entry from the qualifying draw:

- (United States) Reid Carleton
- (Canada) Isade Juneau
- (Canada) Milan Pokrajac
- (Japan) Takao Suzuki

== Champions ==
=== Men's singles ===
- (Canada) Vasek Pospisil def. (Netherlands) Igor Sijsling, 7–6^{(7–2)}, 6–4

=== Women's singles ===
- (Canada) Eugenie Bouchard def. (Canada) Stéphanie Dubois, 6–2, 5–2, retired

=== Men's doubles ===
- (Canada) Philip Bester / (Canada) Vasek Pospisil def. (Japan) Yuichi Ito / (Japan) Takuto Niki, 6–1, 6–2

=== Women's doubles ===
- (Canada) Sharon Fichman / (Canada) Marie-Ève Pelletier def. (Japan) Shuko Aoyama / (Japan) Miki Miyamura, 4–6, 7–5, [10–4]
