= 2015 Challenger Banque Nationale de Granby – Men's doubles =

Men's doubles
- 2015 Challenger Banque Nationale de Granby

Final
- Champions: (Canada) Philip Bester (Canada) Peter Polansky
- Runners-up: (France) Enzo Couacaud (Australia) Luke Saville
- Score: 6–7^{(5–7)}, 7–6^{(7–2)}, [10–7]

Events
Singles	men	women
Doubles	men	women
← 2014 ·	Challenger de Granby	· 2016 →

Marcus Daniell and Artem Sitak were the defending champions, but decided not to participate this year.

Philip Bester and Peter Polansky won the title, defeating Enzo Couacaud and Luke Saville 6–7^{(5–7)}, 7–6^{(7–2)}, [10–7] in the final.

== Seeds ==
1. (Australia) Alex Bolt / (Australia) Andrew Whittington (semifinals, withdrew)
2. (Philippines) Ruben Gonzales / (United Kingdom) Darren Walsh (first round)
3. (Canada) Philip Bester / (Canada) Peter Polansky (champions)
4. (Slovakia) Karol Beck / (Slovakia) Lukáš Lacko (first round, withdrew)

== Draw ==
=== Key ===
- Q = Qualifier
- WC = Wild card
- LL = Lucky loser
- Alt = Alternate
- SE = Special exempt
- PR = Protected ranking
- ITF = ITF entry
- JE = Junior exempt
- w/o = Walkover
- r = Retired
- d = Defaulted
- SR = Special ranking

First round
1	(Australia) A Bolt (Australia) A Whittington	7	6
(Canada) Isade Juneau (Canada) Samuel Monette	5	3
(United States) Jean-Yves Aubone (United States) R Sarmiento	6	6^{5}	[11]
(Belgium) M Authom (France) V Millot	3	7^{7}	[9]
4	(Slovakia) K Beck (Slovakia) L Lacko
(France) E Couacaud (Australia) L Saville	w/o
WC	(Canada) JM Lin (Canada) D Shapovalov	2
(Japan) Hiroyasu Ehara (Japan) Suichi Sekiguchi	1^{r}
WC	(Canada) F Auger-Aliassime (Canada) A Galarneau	3	2
(United States) Dennis Nevolo (United States) E Quigley	6	6
WC	(Canada) Hugo Di Feo (Canada) B Schnur	5	5
3	(Canada) P Bester (Canada) P Polansky	7	7
(United States) N Kryvonos (Canada) K Stevenson	0	4
(Italy) Erik Crepaldi (United States) A El Mihdawy	6	6
(Barbados) D King (Japan) Y Nishioka	3	6	[10]
2	(Philippines) R Gonzales (United Kingdom) D Walsh	6	3	[5]

Quarterfinals
1	(Australia) A Bolt (Australia) A Whittington	6	6
(United States) J-Y Aubone (United States) R Sarmiento	2	3
(France) E Couacaud (Australia) L Saville	6	4	[10]
WC	(Canada) JM Lin (Canada) D Shapovalov	2	6	[4]
(United States) D Nevolo (United States) E Quigley	4	3
3	(Canada) P Bester (Canada) P Polansky	6	6
(Italy) E Crepaldi (United States) A El Mihdawy	2	1
(Barbados) D King (Japan) Y Nishioka	6	6

Semifinals
1	(Australia) A Bolt (Australia) A Whittington
(France) E Couacaud (Australia) L Saville	w/o
3	(Canada) P Bester (Canada) P Polansky	6	6
(Barbados) D King (Japan) Y Nishioka	1	2

Final
(France) E Couacaud (Australia) L Saville	7^{7}	6^{2}	[7]
3	(Canada) P Bester (Canada) P Polansky	6^{5}	7^{7}	[10]
