= 2010 Challenger Banque Nationale de Granby =

Tennis tournament

- Date: July 26 – August 1
- Edition: 17th
- Category: ATP Challenger Tour
- Prize money: US$50,000+H
- Surface: Hard – outdoors
- Location: Granby, Quebec, Canada
- Venue: Club de tennis des Loisirs de Granby

Champions

Singles
- (Germany) Tobias Kamke

Doubles
- (Denmark) Frederik Nielsen / (Australia) Joseph Sirianni
← 2009 ·	Challenger de Granby	· 2011 →

The 2010 Challenger Banque Nationale de Granby was a professional tennis tournament played on outdoor hard courts. It was the 17th edition of the tournament and part of the 2010 ATP Challenger Tour, offering totals of $50,000 in prize money. It took place in Granby, Quebec, Canada between July 26 and August 1, 2010.

== Singles main-draw entrants ==
=== Seeds ===
Country	Player	Rank^{1}	Seed
GER	Tobias Kamke	100	1
JPN	Go Soeda	113	2
COL	Carlos Salamanca	148	3
ISR	Harel Levy	156	4
USA	Jesse Levine	157	5
NED	Igor Sijsling	161	6
CHI	Paul Capdeville	179	7
CAN	Peter Polansky	186	8

- ^{1} Rankings are as of July 19, 2010

=== Other entrants ===
The following players received wildcards into the singles main draw:

- (Canada) Philip Bester
- (Canada) Érik Chvojka
- (Canada) Frank Dancevic
- (Canada) Steven Diez

The following players received entry from the qualifying draw:

- (United Kingdom) Richard Bloomfield
- (Australia) Adam Feeney
- (Japan) Hiroki Kondo
- (Japan) Toshihide Matsui

== Champions ==
=== Singles ===
(Germany) Tobias Kamke def. (Canada) Milos Raonic, 6–3, 7–6^{(7–4)}

=== Doubles ===
(Denmark) Frederik Nielsen / (Australia) Joseph Sirianni def. (Thailand) Sanchai Ratiwatana / (Thailand) Sonchat Ratiwatana, 4–6, 6–4, [10–6]
