= 2015 Challenger Banque Nationale de Granby – Men's singles =

Men's singles
- 2015 Challenger Banque Nationale de Granby

Final
- Champion: (France) Vincent Millot
- Runner-up: (Canada) Philip Bester
- Score: 6–4, 6–4

Events
Singles	men	women
Doubles	men	women
← 2014 ·	Challenger de Granby	· 2016 →

Hiroki Moriya was the defending champion, but decided not to participate this year.

Vincent Millot won the title, defeating Philip Bester 6–4, 6–4 in the final.

== Seeds ==
1. (Germany) Benjamin Becker (first round)
2. (Slovakia) Lukáš Lacko (first round)
3. (Japan) Go Soeda (second round)
4. (Japan) Yoshihito Nishioka (semifinals)
5. (Australia) John-Patrick Smith (withdrew)
6. (Belgium) Maxime Authom (first round, retired)
7. (Italy) Matteo Donati (semifinals)
8. (Barbados) Darian King (second round)

== Draw ==
=== Key ===
- Q = Qualifier
- WC = Wild card
- LL = Lucky loser
- Alt = Alternate
- SE = Special exempt
- PR = Protected ranking
- ITF = ITF entry
- JE = Junior exempt
- w/o = Walkover
- r = Retired
- d = Defaulted
- SR = Special ranking

=== Finals ===
Semifinals
(France) Vincent Millot	6	6
7	(Italy) Matteo Donati	4	1
4	(Japan) Yoshihito Nishioka	6^{5}	6	3
(Canada) Philip Bester	7^{7}	3	6

Final
(France) Vincent Millot	6	6
(Canada) Philip Bester	4	4

=== Top half ===
First round
1	(Germany) B Becker	2	6^{7}
(Canada) P Polansky	6	7^{9}
(Canada) F Peliwo	6^{2}	4
(United States) E Quigley	7^{7}	6
(France) E Couacaud	6	3	2
PR	(United States) Dennis Nevolo	4	6	6
WC	(Canada) Isade Juneau	2	2
(France) V Millot	6	6
3	(Japan) G Soeda	1	6	6
(Japan) Hiroyasu Ehara	6	3	0
Q	(United States) N Kryvonos	5	1
(Japan) Y Uchiyama	7	6
(Japan) Shuichi Sekiguchi	3	6	6
(Canada) F Dancevic	6	3	4
(United States) A El Mihdawy	2	3
7	(Italy) M Donati	6	6

Second round
(Canada) P Polansky	3	6	5
(United States) E Quigley	6	0	7
PR	(United States) D Nevolo	3	5
(France) V Millot	6	7
3	(Japan) G Soeda	2	2
(Japan) Y Uchiyama	6	6
(Japan) S Sekiguchi	4	1
7	(Italy) M Donati	6	6

Quarterfinals
(United States) E Quigley	7^{7}	4	3
(France) V Millot	6^{4}	6	6
(Japan) Y Uchiyama	3	2
7	(Italy) M Donati	6	6

Semifinals
(France) V Millot	6	6
7	(Italy) M Donati	4	1

=== Bottom half ===
First round
8	(Barbados) D King	6	6
Q	(United States) R Sarmiento	2	3
Q	(Australia) A Whittington	3	2
Q	(Canada) F Auger-Aliassime	6	6
(Switzerland) A Bossel	4	0
(Australia) L Saville	6	6
WC	(Canada) B Schnur	3	7^{10}	2
4	(Japan) Y Nishioka	6	6^{8}	6
6	(Belgium) M Authom	6	6^{5}	0^{r}
(Italy) Erik Crepaldi	4	7^{7}	3
LL	(United States) Jean-Yves Aubone	6	6
WC	(Canada) Pavel Krainik	4	2
WC	(Canada) D Shapovalov	6	4	4
(Australia) A Bolt	3	6	6
(Canada) P Bester	7^{7}	6
2	(Slovakia) L Lacko	6^{5}	4

Second round
8	(Barbados) D King	5	3
Q	(Canada) F Auger-Aliassime	7	6
(Australia) L Saville	3	2
4	(Japan) Y Nishioka	6	6
(Italy) E Crepaldi	3	7^{7}	3
LL	(United States) J-Y Aubone	6	6^{5}	6
(Australia) A Bolt	4	3
(Canada) P Bester	6	6

Quarterfinals
Q	(Canada) F Auger-Aliassime	6	2	1
4	(Japan) Y Nishioka	4	6	6
LL	(United States) J-Y Aubone	5	4
(Canada) P Bester	7	6

Semifinals
4	(Japan) Y Nishioka	6^{5}	6	3
(Canada) P Bester	7^{7}	3	6
