= 2009 Challenger Banque Nationale de Granby =

- Date: July 27 – August 2
- Edition: 16th
- Category: ATP Challenger Tour
- Prize money: US$50,000+H
- Surface: Hard – outdoors
- Location: Granby, Quebec, Canada
- Venue: Club de tennis des Loisirs de Granby

Champions

Singles
- (Belgium) Xavier Malisse

Doubles
- (United Kingdom) Colin Fleming / (United Kingdom) Ken Skupski
← 2008 ·	Challenger de Granby	· 2010 →

The 2009 Challenger Banque Nationale de Granby was a professional tennis tournament played on outdoor hard courts. It was the 16th edition of the tournament and part of the 2009 ATP Challenger Tour, offering totals of $50,000 in prize money. It took place in Granby, Quebec, Canada between July 27 and August 2, 2009.

== Singles main-draw entrants ==
=== Seeds ===
Country	Player	Rank^{1}	Seed
GER	Michael Berrer	111	1
USA	Michael Russell	125	2
USA	Brendan Evans	133	3
RSA	Kevin Anderson	156	4
ISR	Harel Levy	179	5
UKR	Sergei Bubka	194	6
AUS	Marinko Matosevic	199	7
RUS	Alexander Kudryavtsev	200	8

- ^{1} Rankings are as of July 20, 2009

=== Other entrants ===
The following players received wildcards into the singles main draw:

- (Canada) Bruno Agostinelli
- (Canada) Frédéric Niemeyer
- (Canada) Vasek Pospisil
- (Canada) Milos Raonic

The following player entered the singles main draw with a special exempt:

- (United Kingdom) Daniel Evans

The following players received entry from the qualifying draw:

- (United States) Lester Cook
- (Germany) Tobias Kamke
- (Japan) Hiroki Kondo
- (Japan) Toshihide Matsui

== Champions ==
=== Singles ===
(Belgium) Xavier Malisse def. (South Africa) Kevin Anderson, 6–4, 6–4

=== Doubles ===
(United Kingdom) Colin Fleming / (United Kingdom) Ken Skupski def. (Israel) Amir Hadad / (Israel) Harel Levy, 6–3, 7–6^{(8–6)}
