= 2012 Challenger Banque Nationale de Granby – Men's singles =

Men's singles
- 2012 Challenger Banque Nationale de Granby

Final
- Champion: (Canada) Vasek Pospisil
- Runner-up: (Netherlands) Igor Sijsling
- Score: 7–6^{(7–2)}, 6–4

Events
| Singles | men | women |
| Doubles | men | women |
| ← 2011 · | Challenger de Granby | · 2013 → |

Édouard Roger-Vasselin was the defending champion but decided not to participate.
Vasek Pospisil defeated Igor Sijsling in the final 7–6^{(7–2)}, 6–4.

== Seeds ==
1. (Canada) Vasek Pospisil (champion)
2. (Netherlands) Igor Sijsling (final)
3. (Canada) Frank Dancevic (second round)
4. (Thailand) Danai Udomchoke (semifinals)
5. (Belgium) Maxime Authom (quarterfinals)
6. (Australia) James Duckworth (quarterfinals)
7. (Canada) Érik Chvojka (first round)
8. (Italy) Thomas Fabbiano (quarterfinals)

== Draw ==
=== Key ===
- Q = Qualifier
- WC = Wild card
- LL = Lucky loser
- Alt = Alternate
- SE = Special exempt
- PR = Protected ranking
- ITF = ITF entry
- JE = Junior exempt
- w/o = Walkover
- r = Retired
- d = Defaulted
- SR = Special ranking

=== Finals ===
Semifinals
1 | (Canada) Vasek Pospisil | 6^{4} | 7 | 6
WC | (Canada) Philip Bester | 7^{7} | 5 | 4
4 | (Thailand) Danai Udomchoke | 7^{7} | 3 | 4
2 | (Netherlands) Igor Sijsling | 6^{3} | 6 | 6

Final
1 | (Canada) Vasek Pospisil | 7^{7} | 6
2 | (Netherlands) Igor Sijsling | 6^{2} | 4

=== Top half ===
First round
1 | (Canada) V Pospisil | 6^{6} | 7^{7} | 3
(Australia) B Mitchell | 7^{8} | 6^{1} | 1^{r}
(Mexico) D Garza | 6 | 6
Q | (Canada) Isade Juneau | 2 | 4
(Canada) F Peliwo | 4 | 6^{6}
(Moldova) R Borvanov | 6 | 7^{8}
Q | (Japan) T Suzuki | 3 | 2
8 | (Italy) T Fabbiano | 6 | 6
3/WC | (Canada) F Dancevic | 6 | 6
(Italy) R Ghedin | 2 | 2
WC | (Canada) P Bester | 4 | 7^{7} | 6
(Japan) T Matsui | 6 | 6^{2} | 4
(United States) A El Mihdawy | 6 | 6
(United Kingdom) R Bloomfield | 2 | 2
(France) Charles-Antoine Brézac | 6 | 7
7 | (Canada) É Chvojka | 4 | 5

Second round
1 | (Canada) V Pospisil | 4 | 7^{7} | 6
(Mexico) D Garza | 6 | 6^{3} | 0
(Moldova) R Borvanov | 1 | 4
8 | (Italy) T Fabbiano | 6 | 6
3/WC | (Canada) F Dancevic | 6^{3} | 4
WC | (Canada) P Bester | 7^{7} | 6
(United States) A El Mihdawy | 1 | 7 | 6
(France) C-A Brézac | 6 | 5 | 4

Quarterfinals
1 | (Canada) V Pospisil | 6 | 1 | 6
8 | (Italy) T Fabbiano | 2 | 6 | 4
WC | (Canada) P Bester | 7 | 6
(United States) A El Mihdawy | 5 | 3

Semifinals
1 | (Canada) V Pospisil | 6^{4} | 7 | 6
WC | (Canada) P Bester | 7^{7} | 5 | 4

=== Bottom half ===
First round
6 | (Australia) J Duckworth | 6 | 4 | 6
Q | (United States) Reid Carleton | 3 | 6 | 4
(Japan) Takuto Niki | 3 | 6^{3}
(United States) B Strode | 6 | 7^{7}
WC | (Canada) Pavel Krainik | 6^{3} | 1
(United States) K Kim | 7^{7} | 6
(Australia) M Reid | 1 | 4
4 | (Thailand) D Udomchoke | 6 | 6
5 | (Belgium) M Authom | 7^{7} | 6
(United States) D Kosakowski | 6^{4} | 4
Q | (Canada) Milan Pokrajac | 6 | 6
WC | (Canada) Samuel Monette | 4 | 2
(Japan) Y Uchiyama | 7^{9} | 2 | 6
(France) Clément Reix | 6^{7} | 6 | 3
(Australia) J Peers | 6^{3} | 5
2 | (Netherlands) I Sijsling | 7^{7} | 7

Second round
6 | (Australia) J Duckworth | 5 | 7 | 7^{7}
(United States) B Strode | 7 | 5 | 6^{2}
(United States) K Kim | 4 | 1
4 | (Thailand) D Udomchoke | 6 | 6
5 | (Belgium) M Authom | 3 | 6 | 7
Q | (Canada) M Pokrajac | 6 | 1 | 5
(Japan) Y Uchiyama | 6^{2} | 2
2 | (Netherlands) I Sijsling | 7^{7} | 6

Quarterfinals
6 | (Australia) J Duckworth | 6^{7} | 1
4 | (Thailand) D Udomchoke | 7^{9} | 6
5 | (Belgium) M Authom | 6^{7} | 6 | 1
2 | (Netherlands) I Sijsling | 7^{9} | 4 | 6

Semifinals
4 | (Thailand) D Udomchoke | 7^{7} | 3 | 4
2 | (Netherlands) I Sijsling | 6^{3} | 6 | 6
