= 2014 Challenger Banque Nationale de Granby – Women's doubles =

Women's doubles
- 2014 Challenger Banque Nationale de Granby

Final
- Champions: (Japan) Hiroko Kuwata (Japan) Riko Sawayanagi
- Runners-up: (Canada) Erin Routliffe (Canada) Carol Zhao
- Score: Walkover

Events
Singles	men	women
Doubles	men	women
← 2013 ·	Challenger de Granby	· 2015 →

Lena Litvak and Carol Zhao are the defending champions, having won the event in 2013, but decided not to play together. Litvak played with Marcela Zacarías and lost in the first round to Miharu Imanishi and Miyabi Inoue, while Zhao played with Erin Routliffe.

Hiroko Kuwata and Riko Sawayanagi won the title after Erin Routliffe and Carol Zhao gave them a walkover in the final because of an injury.

== Seeds ==
1. (France) Julie Coin / (France) Stéphanie Foretz (semifinals, withdrew)
2. (Chinese Taipei) Hsu Chieh-yu / (United States) Alexandra Mueller (semifinals)
3. (Japan) Eri Hozumi / (Japan) Chiaki Okadaue (first round)
4. (Japan) Hiroko Kuwata / (Japan) Riko Sawayanagi (champions)

== Draw ==
=== Key ===
- Q = Qualifier
- WC = Wild card
- LL = Lucky loser
- Alt = Alternate
- SE = Special exempt
- PR = Protected ranking
- ITF = ITF entry
- JE = Junior exempt
- w/o = Walkover
- r = Retired
- d = Defaulted
- SR = Special ranking

=== Draw ===
First round
1	(France) J Coin (France) S Foretz	6	6
(Japan) M Hibi (United Kingdom) S Murray	3	4
(Australia) I Holland (Brazil) N Rossi	4	4
WC	(Canada) G Liang (Canada) S Molnar	6	6
3	(Japan) E Hozumi (Japan) C Okadaue	2	3
(Canada) E Routliffe (Canada) C Zhao	6	6
(United States) L Litvak (Mexico) M Zacarías	6	2	[7]
(Japan) M Imanishi (Japan) M Inoue	1	6	[10]
(United States) M Hammond (Canada) R Johanson	3	4
(Canada) K Blajkevitch (United States) D Mills	6	6
(Canada) M-A Leduc (Canada) C Petrick	3	3
4	(Japan) H Kuwata (Japan) R Sawayanagi	6	6
(Canada) M Patrascu (Canada) C Robillard-Millette	1	3
(Russia) K Lykina (United Kingdom) E Webley-Smith	6	6
(Japan) M Ayukawa (Poland) J Jegiołka	6^{4}	3
2	(Chinese Taipei) C-y Hsu (United States) A Mueller	7^{7}	6

Quarterfinals
1	(France) J Coin (France) S Foretz	6	6
WC	(Canada) G Liang (Canada) S Molnar	4	3
(Canada) E Routliffe (Canada) C Zhao	3	6	[13]
(Japan) M Imanishi (Japan) M Inoue	6	1	[11]
(Canada) K Blajkevitch (United States) D Mills	1	5
4	(Japan) H Kuwata (Japan) R Sawayanagi	6	7
(Russia) K Lykina (United Kingdom) E Webley-Smith	5	2
2	(Chinese Taipei) C-y Hsu (United States) A Mueller	7	6

Semifinals
1	(France) J Coin (France) S Foretz
(Canada) E Routliffe (Canada) C Zhao	w/o
4	(Japan) H Kuwata (Japan) R Sawayanagi	7^{7}	7^{12}
2	(Chinese Taipei) C-y Hsu (United States) A Mueller	6^{3}	6^{10}

Final
(Canada) E Routliffe (Canada) C Zhao
4	(Japan) H Kuwata (Japan) R Sawayanagi	w/o
