= 2015 Challenger Banque Nationale de Granby =

- Date: July 20–26
- Edition: 22nd (men); 5th (women)
- Category: ATP Challenger Tour; ITF Women's Circuit
- Prize money: US$100,000 (men); US$50,000 (women)
- Surface: Hard – outdoors
- Location: Granby, Quebec, Canada
- Venue: Club de tennis des Loisirs de Granby

Champions

Men's singles
- (France) Vincent Millot

Women's singles
- (United Kingdom) Johanna Konta

Men's doubles
- (Canada) Philip Bester / (Canada) Peter Polansky

Women's doubles
- (Australia) Jessica Moore / (Australia) Storm Sanders
- Challenger de Granby

The 2015 Challenger Banque Nationale de Granby was a professional tennis tournament played on outdoor hard courts. It was the 22nd edition, for men, and 5th edition, for women, of the tournament and part of the 2015 ATP Challenger Tour and the 2015 ITF Women's Circuit, offering totals of $100,000, for men, and $50,000, for women, in prize money. It took place in Granby, Quebec, Canada between July 20 and July 26, 2015.

== Men's singles main-draw entrants ==
=== Seeds ===
Country	Player	Rank^{1}	Seed
GER	Benjamin Becker	54	1
SVK	Lukáš Lacko	93	2
JPN	Go Soeda	108	3
JPN	Yoshihito Nishioka	143	4
~~AUS~~	~~John-Patrick Smith~~	~~156~~	~~5~~
BEL	Maxime Authom	172	6
ITA	Matteo Donati	183	7
BAR	Darian King	196	8

- ^{1} Rankings are as of July 13, 2015

=== Other entrants ===
The following players received wildcards into the singles main draw:

- (Canada) Isade Juneau
- (Canada) Pavel Krainik
- (Canada) Brayden Schnur
- (Canada) Denis Shapovalov

The following player entered the singles main draw with a protected ranking:

- (United States) Dennis Nevolo

The following players received entry from the qualifying draw:

- (Canada) Félix Auger-Aliassime
- (United States) Nikita Kryvonos
- (United States) Raymond Sarmiento
- (Australia) Andrew Whittington

The following player received entry as a lucky loser:

- (United States) Jean-Yves Aubone

== Women's singles main-draw entrants ==
=== Seeds ===
Country	Player	Rank^{1}	Seed
GBR	Johanna Konta	127	1
JPN	Naomi Osaka	159	2
FRA	Stéphanie Foretz	171	3
FRA	Julie Coin	187	4
MEX	Marcela Zacarías	214	5
AUS	Olivia Rogowska	224	6
GBR	Naomi Broady	225	7
FRA	Amandine Hesse	229	8

- ^{1} Rankings are as of July 13, 2015

=== Other entrants ===
The following players received wildcards into the singles main draw:

- (Canada) Ayan Broomfield
- (Canada) Charlotte Robillard-Millette
- (United Kingdom) Laura Robson
- (Canada) Erin Routliffe

The following players received entry from the qualifying draw:

- (United States) Allie Halbauer
- (Japan) Akari Inoue
- (Canada) Maria Patrascu
- (Canada) Katherine Sebov

== Champions ==
=== Men's singles ===
- (France) Vincent Millot def. (Canada) Philip Bester, 6–4, 6–4

=== Women's singles ===
- (United Kingdom) Johanna Konta def. (France) Stéphanie Foretz, 6–2, 6–4

=== Men's doubles ===
- (Canada) Philip Bester / (Canada) Peter Polansky def. (France) Enzo Couacaud / (Australia) Luke Saville, 6–7^{(5–7)}, 7–6^{(7–2)}, [10–7]

=== Women's doubles ===
- (Australia) Jessica Moore / (Australia) Storm Sanders def. (United Kingdom) Laura Robson / (Canada) Erin Routliffe, 7–5, 6–2
