= 2014 Challenger Banque Nationale de Granby =

- Date: July 14–20
- Edition: 21st (men); 4th (women)
- Category: ATP Challenger Tour; ITF Women's Circuit
- Prize money: US$50,000+H (men); US$25,000 (women)
- Surface: Hard – outdoors
- Location: Granby, Quebec, Canada
- Venue: Club de tennis des Loisirs de Granby

Champions

Men's singles
- (Japan) Hiroki Moriya

Women's singles
- (Japan) Miharu Imanishi

Men's doubles
- (New Zealand) Marcus Daniell / (New Zealand) Artem Sitak

Women's doubles
- (Japan) Hiroko Kuwata / (Japan) Riko Sawayanagi
- Challenger de Granby

The 2014 Challenger Banque Nationale de Granby was a professional tennis tournament played on outdoor hard courts. It was the 21st edition, for men, and 4th edition, for women, of the tournament and part of the 2014 ATP Challenger Tour and the 2014 ITF Women's Circuit, offering totals of $50,000, for men, and $25,000, for women, in prize money. It took place in Granby, Quebec, Canada between July 14 and July 20, 2014.

== Men's singles main-draw entrants ==
=== Seeds ===
| Country | Player | Rank^{1} | Seed |
|---|---|---|---|
| SVK | Lukáš Lacko | 83 | 1 |
| TUN | Malek Jaziri | 117 | 2 |
| JPN | Hiroki Moriya | 164 | 3 |
| BEL | Ruben Bemelmans | 183 | 4 |
| AUS | Luke Saville | 184 | 5 |
| USA | Chase Buchanan | 187 | 6 |
| FRA | Vincent Millot | 207 | 7 |
| IRL | James McGee | 217 | 8 |

- ^{1} Rankings are as of July 7, 2014

=== Other entrants ===
The following players received wildcards into the singles main draw:

- (Canada) Érik Chvojka
- (Canada) Isade Juneau
- (Canada) Tommy Mylnikov
- (Canada) Brayden Schnur

The following players received entry from the qualifying draw:

- (Ecuador) Gonzalo Escobar
- (Australia) Jordan Kerr
- (Canada) Pavel Krainik
- (Canada) Osama Zoghlami

== Champions ==
=== Men's singles ===
- (Japan) Hiroki Moriya def. (France) Fabrice Martin, 7–5, 6–7^{(4–7)}, 6–3

=== Women's singles ===
- (Japan) Miharu Imanishi def. (France) Stéphanie Foretz, 6–4, 6–4

=== Men's doubles ===
- (New Zealand) Marcus Daniell / (New Zealand) Artem Sitak def. (Australia) Jordan Kerr / (France) Fabrice Martin, 7–6^{(7–5)}, 5–7, [10–5]

=== Women's doubles ===
- (Japan) Hiroko Kuwata / (Japan) Riko Sawayanagi def. (Canada) Erin Routliffe / (Canada) Carol Zhao by walkover
