= 2016 Challenger Banque Nationale de Granby =

- Date: August 1–7
- Edition: 23rd (men); 5th (women)
- Category: ATP Challenger Tour; ITF Women's Circuit
- Prize money: US$100,000 (men); US$50,000 (women)
- Surface: Hard – outdoors
- Location: Granby, Quebec, Canada
- Venue: Club de tennis des Loisirs de Granby

Champions

Men's singles
- (United States) Frances Tiafoe

Women's singles
- (United States) Jennifer Brady

Men's doubles
- (Brazil) Guilherme Clezar / (Colombia) Alejandro González

Women's doubles
- (United States) Jamie Loeb / (Belgium) An-Sophie Mestach
- Challenger de Granby

The 2016 Challenger Banque Nationale de Granby was a professional tennis tournament played on outdoor hard courts. It was the 23rd edition, for men, and 6th edition, for women, of the tournament and part of the 2016 ATP Challenger Tour and the 2016 ITF Women's Circuit, offering totals of $100,000, for men, and $50,000, for women, in prize money. It took take place in Granby, Quebec, Canada between August 1 and August 7, 2016.

== Men's singles main-draw entrants ==
=== Seeds ===
Country	Player	Rank^{1}	Seed
FRA	Stéphane Robert	58	1
FRA	Quentin Halys	136	2
IND	Saketh Myneni	152	3
USA	Frances Tiafoe	157	4
COL	Alejandro González	163	5
COL	Eduardo Struvay	172	6
FRA	Vincent Millot	178	7
FRA	Grégoire Barrère	189	8

- ^{1} Rankings are as of July 25, 2016

=== Other entrants ===
The following players received wildcards into the singles main draw:

- (Canada) Félix Auger-Aliassime
- (Canada) Philip Bester
- (Canada) Brayden Schnur
- (Canada) Denis Shapovalov

The following players received entry from the qualifying draw:

- (United Kingdom) Edward Corrie
- (Ecuador) Emilio Gómez
- (Republic of Ireland) James McGee
- (Japan) Yasutaka Uchiyama

== Women's singles main-draw entrants ==
=== Seeds ===
Country	Player	Rank^{1}	Seed
ISR	Julia Glushko	134	1
USA	Jessica Pegula	135	2
USA	Jennifer Brady	150	3
JPN	Hiroko Kuwata	154	4
CZE	Barbora Štefková	176	5
BLR	Olga Govortsova	179	6
USA	Asia Muhammad	184	7
SRB	Jovana Jakšić	204	8

- ^{1} Rankings are as of July 25, 2016

=== Other entrants ===
The following players received wildcards into the singles main draw:

- (Canada) Bianca Andreescu
- (Canada) Marie-Alexandre Leduc
- (Canada) Charlotte Robillard-Millette
- (Canada) Erin Routliffe

The following players received entry from the qualifying draw:

- (Canada) Catherine Leduc
- (United States) Nicole Melichar
- (United States) Alexandra Stevenson
- (United States) Jessica Wacnik

The following players entered the singles main draw with a protected ranking:

- (Japan) Miharu Imanishi
- (United Kingdom) Samantha Murray

== Champions ==
=== Men's singles ===
- (United States) Frances Tiafoe def. (El Salvador) Marcelo Arévalo, 6–1, 6–1

=== Women's singles ===
- (United States) Jennifer Brady def. (Belarus) Olga Govortsova, 7–5, 6–2

=== Men's doubles ===
- (Brazil) Guilherme Clezar / (Colombia) Alejandro González def. (India) Saketh Myneni / (India) Sanam Singh, 3–6, 6–1, [12–10]

=== Women's doubles ===
- (United States) Jamie Loeb / (Belgium) An-Sophie Mestach def. (Israel) Julia Glushko / (Belarus) Olga Govortsova, 6–4, 6–4
