= 2014 Challenger Banque Nationale de Granby – Women's singles =

Women's singles
- 2014 Challenger Banque Nationale de Granby

Final
- Champion: (Japan) Miharu Imanishi
- Runner-up: (France) Stéphanie Foretz
- Score: 6–4, 6–4

Events
Singles	men	women
Doubles	men	women
← 2013 ·	Challenger de Granby	· 2015 →

Risa Ozaki is the defending champion, having won the event in 2013, but chose not to participate.

Miharu Imanishi won the title, defeating Stéphanie Foretz 6–4, 6–4 in the final.

== Seeds ==
1. (Japan) Eri Hozumi (quarterfinals)
2. (Japan) Hiroko Kuwata (quarterfinals)
3. (Chinese Taipei) Hsu Chieh-yu (first round)
4. (Japan) Miharu Imanishi (champion)
5. (France) Julie Coin (semifinals)
6. (United Kingdom) Samantha Murray (first round)
7. (Canada) Françoise Abanda (semifinals)
8. (France) Stéphanie Foretz (final)

== Main draw ==
=== Key ===
- Q = Qualifier
- WC = Wild card
- LL = Lucky loser
- Alt = Alternate
- SE = Special exempt
- PR = Protected ranking
- ITF = ITF entry
- JE = Junior exempt
- w/o = Walkover
- r = Retired
- d = Defaulted
- SR = Special ranking

=== Finals ===
Semifinals
5	(France) Julie Coin	2	6	3
8	(France) Stéphanie Foretz	6	3	6
4	(Japan) Miharu Imanishi	6	6
7	(Canada) Françoise Abanda	0	2

Final
8	(France) Stéphanie Foretz	4	4
4	(Japan) Miharu Imanishi	6	6

=== Top half ===
First round
1	(Japan) E Hozumi	7	6
Q	(Canada) K Blajkevitch	5	0
Q	(Japan) M Ayukawa	2	6	6^{5}
WC	(Canada) C Robillard-Millette	6	4	7^{7}
(Japan) S Aoyama	1	3
(France) S Reix	6	6
(Japan) M Inoue	4	2
5	(France) J Coin	6	6
3	(Chinese Taipei) C-y Hsu	5	7	0
(Canada) S Dubois	7	5	6
WC	(Canada) C Zhao	5	6	6
Q	(Canada) E Routliffe	7	1	3
Q	(United States) L Litvak	1	3
(Poland) J Jegiołka	6	6
(United Kingdom) E Webley-Smith	0	7^{7}	3
8	(France) S Foretz	6	6^{5}	6

Second round
1	(Japan) E Hozumi	6	6
WC	(Canada) C Robillard-Millette	2	2
(France) S Reix	2	1
5	(France) J Coin	6	6
(Canada) S Dubois	6	7
WC	(Canada) C Zhao	2	5
(Poland) J Jegiołka	4	5
8	(France) S Foretz	6	7

Quarterfinals
1	(Japan) E Hozumi	6	4	4
5	(France) J Coin	4	6	6
(Canada) S Dubois	7^{7}	5	5
8	(France) S Foretz	6^{3}	7	7

Semifinals
5	(France) J Coin	2	6	3
8	(France) S Foretz	6	3	6

=== Bottom half ===
First round
6	(United Kingdom) S Murray	6	4	4
(Japan) R Sawayanagi	3	6	6
WC	(Canada) G Liang	6	6
Q	(Republic of Ireland) A Bowtell	4	4
Q	(Russia) K Lykina	0	3
(Japan) C Okadaue	6	6
(Brazil) N Rossi	2	0
4	(Japan) M Imanishi	6	6
7	(Canada) F Abanda	7	6
(United States) A Mueller	5	4
Q	(Australia) I Holland	1	1
(Japan) M Hibi	6	6
(Mexico) M Zacarías	7	6
WC	(Canada) S Molnar	5	3
Q	(Canada) R Johanson	6^{5}	0
2	(Japan) H Kuwata	7^{7}	6

Second round
(Japan) R Sawayanagi	0	6	6
WC	(Canada) G Liang	6	3	2
(Japan) C Okadaue	4	7^{7}	1
4	(Japan) M Imanishi	6	6^{3}	6
7	(Canada) F Abanda	6	7
(Japan) M Hibi	1	5
(Mexico) M Zacarías	1	4
2	(Japan) H Kuwata	6	6

Quarterfinals
(Japan) R Sawayanagi	6^{1}	4
4	(Japan) M Imanishi	7^{7}	6
7	(Canada) F Abanda	6	6
2	(Japan) H Kuwata	2	0

Semifinals
4	(Japan) M Imanishi	6	6
7	(Canada) F Abanda	0	2
