= 2010 Challenger Banque Nationale de Granby – Singles =

Singles
- 2010 Challenger Banque Nationale de Granby

Final
- Champion: (Germany) Tobias Kamke
- Runner-up: (Canada) Milos Raonic
- Score: 6–3, 7–6(4)

Events
Singles	Doubles
← 2009 ·	Challenger de Granby	· 2011 →

Xavier Malisse was the defending champion, but chose to compete in ATP 250: Los Angeles instead.
Tobias Kamke defeated Milos Raonic 6–3, 7–6(4) in the final.

== Seeds ==
1. (Germany) Tobias Kamke (champion)
2. (Japan) Go Soeda (semifinals)
3. (Colombia) Carlos Salamanca (second round)
4. (Israel) Harel Levy (second round)
5. (United States) Jesse Levine (first round)
6. (Netherlands) Igor Sijsling (first round)
7. (Chile) Paul Capdeville (quarterfinals)
8. (Canada) Peter Polansky (first round)

== Draw ==
=== Key ===
- Q = Qualifier
- WC = Wild card
- LL = Lucky loser
- Alt = Alternate
- SE = Special exempt
- PR = Protected ranking
- ITF = ITF entry
- JE = Junior exempt
- w/o = Walkover
- r = Retired
- d = Defaulted
- SR = Special ranking

=== Finals ===
Semifinals
1	(Germany) Tobias Kamke	6	1
WC	(Canada) Frank Dancevic	2	0^{r}
(Canada) Milos Raonic	6	2	7
2	(Japan) Go Soeda	2	6	6^{5}

Final
1	(Germany) Tobias Kamke	6	7
(Canada) Milos Raonic	3	6^{4}

=== Top half ===
First round
1	(Germany) T Kamke	6	6
(Canada) P-L Duclos	3	4
Q	(Australia) A Feeney	6	6
Q	(Japan) H Kondo	1	2
(Slovakia) I Klec	6	6
WC	(Canada) S Diez	3	2
(Australia) G Jones	7	6
8	(Canada) P Polansky	6^{5}	4
4	(Israel) H Levy	6	6
(South Korea) Y-K Lim	1	0
(Canada) V Pospisil	6^{6}	6	3
(Japan) T Suzuki	7	4	6
(India) P Amritraj	5	3
Q	(Japan) T Matsui	7	6
WC	(Canada) F Dancevic	7	6
6	(Netherlands) I Sijlsing	5	3

Second round
1	(Germany) T Kamke	7	6
Q	(Australia) A Feeney	6^{7}	4
(Slovakia) I Klec	2	6	2
(Australia) G Jones	6	4	6
4	(Israel) H Levy	6	4	6^{3}
(Japan) T Suzuki	3	6	7
Q	(Japan) T Matsui	4	5
WC	(Canada) F Dancevic	6	7

Quarterfinals
1	(Germany) T Kamke	6	6
(Australia) G Jones	3	2
(Japan) T Suzuki	6^{3}	3
WC	(Canada) F Dancevic	7	6

Semifinals
1	(Germany) T Kamke	6	1
WC	(Canada) F Dancevic	2	0^{r}

=== Bottom half ===
First round
7	(Chile) P Capdeville	3	6	6
(United States) B Evans	6	3	2
(Ukraine) S Bubka	6	6^{4}	6
Q	(United Kingdom) R Bloomfield	3	7	4
WC	(Canada) P Bester	4	5
(Canada) M Raonic	6	7
(Japan) T Ito	6	3	4
3	(Colombia) C Salamanca	4	6	6
5	(United States) J Levine	6^{6}	3
(Australia) J Sirianni	7	6
(Australia) B Klein	6	6
WC	(Canada) E Chvojka	3	4
(Romania) M Copil	2	6	3
(Denmark) F Nielsen	6	3	6
(South Africa) I van der Merwe	4	6^{1}
2	(Japan) G Soeda	6	7

Second round
7	(Chile) P Capdeville	6^{1}	6	7
(Ukraine) S Bubka	7	4	6^{4}
(Canada) M Raonic	7	6
3	(Colombia) C Salamanca	6^{7}	1
(Australia) J Sirianni	3	3
(Australia) B Klein	6	6
(Denmark) F Nielsen	3	4
2	(Japan) G Soeda	6	6

Quarterfinals
7	(Chile) P Capdeville	4	2
(Canada) M Raonic	6	6
(Australia) B Klein	6^{3}	1
2	(Japan) G Soeda	7	6

Semifinals
(Canada) M Raonic	6	2	7
2	(Japan) G Soeda	2	6	6^{5}
