= 2012 Challenger Banque Nationale de Granby – Women's singles =

Women's singles
- 2012 Challenger Banque Nationale de Granby

Final
- Champion: (Canada) Eugenie Bouchard
- Runner-up: (Canada) Stéphanie Dubois
- Score: 6–2, 5–2, retired

Events
Singles	men	women
Doubles	men	women
← 2011 ·	Challenger de Granby	· 2013 →

Stéphanie Dubois was the defending champion, but lost in the final 6–2, 5–2, retired to Eugenie Bouchard.

== Seeds ==
1. (Canada) Stéphanie Dubois (final)
2. (United States) Alison Riske (quarterfinals)
3. (France) Victoria Larrière (first round, retired)
4. (France) Julie Coin (semifinals)
5. (Canada) Marie-Ève Pelletier (quarterfinals)
6. (Canada) Sharon Fichman (first round)
7. (Japan) Aiko Nakamura (quarterfinals)
8. (Israel) Julia Glushko (semifinals)

== Draw ==
=== Key ===
- Q = Qualifier
- WC = Wild card
- LL = Lucky loser
- Alt = Alternate
- SE = Special exempt
- PR = Protected ranking
- ITF = ITF entry
- JE = Junior exempt
- w/o = Walkover
- r = Retired
- d = Defaulted
- SR = Special ranking

=== Finals ===
Semifinals
1	(Canada) Stéphanie Dubois	6	7
8	(Israel) Julia Glushko	1	5
4	(France) Julie Coin	4	2
(Canada) Eugenie Bouchard	6	6

Final
1	(Canada) Stéphanie Dubois	2	2^{r}
(Canada) Eugenie Bouchard	6	5

=== Top half ===
First round
1	(Canada) S Dubois	6	6
Q	(Japan) M Miyamura	2	2
(Japan) S Akita	1	7	3
(United States) C-y Hsu	6	5	6
Q	(United States) D Damian	1	4
Q	(France) S Benamar	6	6
(Austria) N Rottmann	0	6	3
7	(Japan) A Nakamura	6	4	6
3	(France) V Larrière	5	0^{r}
(Canada) G Dabrowski	7	3
(Israel) K Shlomo	1	1
(Japan) S Aoyama	6	6
WC	(Canada) E Routliffe	1	5
(Poland) J Jegiołka	6	7
(United States) A Mueller	6^{2}	3
8	(Israel) J Glushko	7^{7}	6

Second round
1	(Canada) S Dubois	6	6
(United States) C-y Hsu	1	3
Q	(France) S Benamar	2	6	0
7	(Japan) A Nakamura	6	2	6
(Canada) G Dabrowski	7	7
(Japan) S Aoyama	5	5
(Poland) J Jegiołka	5	4
8	(Israel) J Glushko	7	6

Quarterfinals
1	(Canada) S Dubois	6	6
7	(Japan) A Nakamura	0	1
(Canada) G Dabrowski	3	2
8	(Israel) J Glushko	6	6

Semifinals
1	(Canada) S Dubois	6	7
8	(Israel) J Glushko	1	5

=== Bottom half ===
First round
5	(Canada) M-È Pelletier	6	3	6
WC	(Canada) C Zhao	0	6	2
Q	(United States) S Krywacz	4	4
Q	(Russia) N Kukharchuk	6	6
(United States) L Litvak	3	7^{7}	3
Q	(Japan) A Yamasoto	6	6^{5}	6
(Japan) M Eguchi	1	3
4	(France) J Coin	6	6
6	(Canada) S Fichman	3	2
(Canada) E Bouchard	6	6
(United States) J Elie	1	6	4
WC	(Canada) F Abanda	6	2	6
Q	(Indonesia) R Tedjakusuma	6	6
WC	(Canada) C Petrick	1	4
Q	(United States) D Ospina	2	6	1
2	(United States) A Riske	6	3	6

Second round
5	(Canada) M-È Pelletier	6	6
Q	(Russia) N Kukharchuk	2	1
Q	(Japan) A Yamasoto	2	4
4	(France) J Coin	6	6
(Canada) E Bouchard	6	7
WC	(Canada) F Abanda	2	5
Q	(Indonesia) R Tedjakusuma	1	2
2	(United States) A Riske	6	6

Quarterfinals
5	(Canada) M-È Pelletier	3	2
4	(France) J Coin	6	6
(Canada) E Bouchard	6	5	6
2	(United States) A Riske	3	7	2

Semifinals
4	(France) J Coin	4	2
(Canada) E Bouchard	6	6
