= 2010 Challenger Banque Nationale de Granby – Doubles =

Doubles
- 2010 Challenger Banque Nationale de Granby

Final
- Champions: (Denmark) Frederik Nielsen (Australia) Joseph Sirianni
- Runners-up: (Thailand) Sanchai Ratiwatana (Thailand) Sonchat Ratiwatana
- Score: 4–6, 6–4, [10–6]

Events
Singles	Doubles
← 2009 ·	Challenger de Granby	· 2011 →

Colin Fleming and Ken Skupski were the defending champions; however, they didn't start this year.
Unseeded Frederik Nielsen and Joseph Sirianni won in the final 4–6, 6–4, [10–6], against 1st-seeded Sanchai Ratiwatana and Sonchat Ratiwatana.

== Seeds ==
1. (Thailand) Sanchai Ratiwatana / (Thailand) Sonchat Ratiwatana (final)
2. (Israel) Harel Levy / (United States) David Martin (first round)
3. (Philippines) Treat Conrad Huey / (United Kingdom) Dominic Inglot (quarterfinals)
4. (Australia) Kaden Hensel / (Australia) Adam Hubble (semifinals)

== Draw ==
=== Key ===
- Q = Qualifier
- WC = Wild card
- LL = Lucky loser
- Alt = Alternate
- SE = Special exempt
- PR = Protected ranking
- ITF = ITF entry
- JE = Junior exempt
- w/o = Walkover
- r = Retired
- d = Defaulted
- SR = Special ranking

=== Draw ===
First round
1	(Thailand) Sa Ratiwatana (Thailand) So Ratiwatana	6	6
(Australia) G Jones (Australia) B Klein	4	3
WC	(Canada) A El Tabakh (Canada) Z White	2	5
(India) P Amritraj (United States) B Evans	6	7
4	(Australia) K Hensel (Australia) A Hubble	6	6
WC	(Canada) S Diez (Canada) F Peliwo	2	0
(United Kingdom) R Bloomfield (Australia) A Feeney	4	5
(Chile) P Capdeville (Colombia) C Salamanca	6	7
(Canada) P-L Duclos (Netherlands) I Sijsling	4	2
(Denmark) F Nielsen (Australia) J Sirianni	6	6
(South Africa) R Klaasen (South Africa) I van der Merwe	4	7	[3]
3	(Philippines) TC Huey (United Kingdom) D Inglot	6	6^{4}	[10]
(Japan) H Kondo (Japan) G Soeda	1	2
(United States) J Levine (Canada) V Pospisil	6	6
WC	(Canada) E Chvojka (Canada) P Polansky	6	3	[10]
2	(Israel) H Levy (United States) D Martin	3	6	[5]

Quarterfinals
1	(Thailand) Sa Ratiwatana (Thailand) So Ratiwatana	6	6
(India) P Amritraj (United States) B Evans	4	1
4	(Australia) K Hensel (Australia) A Hubble	6	6
(Chile) P Capdeville (Colombia) C Salamanca	2	3
(Denmark) F Nielsen (Australia) J Sirianni	6	6
3	(Philippines) TC Huey (United Kingdom) D Inglot	4	2
(United States) J Levine (Canada) V Pospisil	6	7
WC	(Canada) E Chvojka (Canada) P Polansky	3	6^{3}

Semifinals
1	(Thailand) Sa Ratiwatana (Thailand) So Ratiwatana	5	7	[11]
4	(Australia) K Hensel (Australia) A Hubble	7	6^{10}	[9]
(Denmark) F Nielsen (Australia) J Sirianni	6	6^{5}	[10]
(United States) J Levine (Canada) V Pospisil	4	7	[8]

Finals
1	(Thailand) Sa Ratiwatana (Thailand) So Ratiwatana	6	4	[6]
(Denmark) F Nielsen (Australia) J Sirianni	4	6	[10]
