= 2016 Challenger Banque Nationale de Granby – Women's doubles =

Women's doubles
- 2016 Challenger Banque Nationale de Granby

Final
- Champions: (United States) Jamie Loeb (Belgium) An-Sophie Mestach
- Runners-up: (Israel) Julia Glushko (Belarus) Olga Govortsova
- Score: 6–4, 6–4

Events
Singles	men	women
Doubles	men	women
- Challenger de Granby

Jessica Moore and Storm Sanders were the defending champions, but decided not to participate this year.

Jamie Loeb and An-Sophie Mestach won the title, defeating Julia Glushko and Olga Govortsova 6–4, 6–4 in the final.

== Seeds ==
1. (United States) Jamie Loeb / (Belgium) An-Sophie Mestach (champions)
2. (Japan) Hiroko Kuwata / (United States) Jessica Pegula (semifinals)
3. (Czech Republic) Barbora Štefková / (Canada) Carol Zhao (first round)
4. (United States) Jennifer Brady / (United States) Asia Muhammad (quarterfinals, withdrew)

== Draw ==
Key

- Q = Qualifier
- WC = Wild card
- LL = Lucky loser
- Alt = Alternate
- ITF = ITF entry
- PR = Protected ranking
- SR = Special ranking
- SE = Special exempt
- JE = Junior exempt
- JR = Junior Accelerator Programme entrant
- CO = College Accelerator Programme entrant
- NG = Next Gen Accelerator Program entrant
- w/o = Walkover
- r = Retired
- d = Defaulted

First round
1	(United States) J Loeb (Belgium) A-S Mestach	6	6
(Canada) P Januskova (Canada) A Wozniak	3	1
WC	(Canada) A Broomfield (United States) S Carrington	3	2
(Japan) M Imanishi (Canada) M Patrascu	6	6
3	(Czech Republic) B Štefková (Canada) C Zhao	2	3
(United States) E Halbauer (Canada) E Routliffe	6	6
(Mexico) S León (France) C Roméo	3	5
WC	(Canada) B Andreescu (United States) A Stevenson	6	7
(Italy) C Ferrando (Mexico) V Rodríguez	6^{5}	3
(Israel) J Glushko (Belarus) O Govortsova	7^{7}	6
WC	(Canada) M Auger-Aliassime (Canada) A-S Courteau	0	0
4	(United States) J Brady (United States) A Muhammad	6	6
(United Kingdom) S Murray (United States) M Oudin	6	4	[5]
(Serbia) J Jakšić (United States) J Wacnik	2	6	[10]
(Canada) M-A Leduc (Canada) C Robillard-Millette	6	4	[5]
2	(Japan) H Kuwata (United States) J Pegula	2	6	[10]

Quarterfinals
1	(United States) J Loeb (Belgium) A-S Mestach	6	6
(Japan) M Imanishi (Canada) M Patrascu	2	2
(United States) E Halbauer (Canada) E Routliffe	6	4	[10]
WC	(Canada) B Andreescu (United States) A Stevenson	3	6	[2]
(Israel) J Glushko (Belarus) O Govortsova	w/o
4	(United States) J Brady (United States) A Muhammad
(Serbia) J Jakšić (United States) J Wacnik	6	4	[9]
2	(Japan) H Kuwata (United States) J Pegula	3	6	[11]

Semifinals
1	(United States) J Loeb (Belgium) A-S Mestach	5	6	[10]
(United States) E Halbauer (Canada) E Routliffe	7	4	[8]
(Israel) J Glushko (Belarus) O Govortsova	6	6
2	(Japan) H Kuwata (United States) J Pegula	2	4

Final
1	(United States) J Loeb (Belgium) A-S Mestach	6	6
(Israel) J Glushko (Belarus) O Govortsova	4	4
