= 2009 Challenger Banque Nationale de Granby – Doubles =

Doubles
- 2009 Challenger Banque Nationale de Granby

Final
- Champions: (United Kingdom) Colin Fleming (United Kingdom) Ken Skupski
- Runners-up: (Israel) Amir Hadad (Israel) Harel Levy
- Score: 6–3, 7–6(6)

Events
Singles	Doubles
← 2008 ·	Challenger de Granby	· 2010 →

Philip Bester and Peter Polansky were the defending champions but they chose to not compete together this time.

Bester played with Kamil Pajkowski, but they lost to Lester Cook and Michael Yani in the first round.

Polansky teamed up with Bruno Agostinelli and this pair lost in the first round too. They were eliminated by Pierre-Ludovic Duclos and Alexandre Kudryavtsev.

Colin Fleming and Ken Skupski defeated Amir Hadad and Harel Levy in the final 6–3, 7–6(6).

== Seeds ==
1. (Thailand) Sanchai Ratiwatana / (Thailand) Sonchat Ratiwatana (semifinals)
2. (United Kingdom) Colin Fleming / (United Kingdom) Ken Skupski (champions)
3. (Canada) Pierre-Ludovic Duclos / (Russia) Alexandre Kudryavtsev (quarterfinals)
4. (United States) Brian Battistone / (United States) Dann Battistone (first round)

== Draw ==
=== Key ===
- Q = Qualifier
- WC = Wild card
- LL = Lucky loser
- Alt = Alternate
- SE = Special exempt
- PR = Protected ranking
- ITF = ITF entry
- JE = Junior exempt
- w/o = Walkover
- r = Retired
- d = Defaulted
- SR = Special ranking

=== Draw ===
First round
1	(Thailand) Sa Ratiwatana (Thailand) So Ratiwatana	6	6
WC	(Canada) S Jacques (Canada) Y Re	2	2
WC	(Canada) P Bester (Canada) K Pajkowski	4	6^{6}
(United States) L Cook (United States) M Yani	6	7
4	(United States) B Battistone (United States) D Battistone	5	3
(Italy) L D'Agord (Brazil) R Grilli	7	6
(Philippines) TC Huey (India) H Mankad	5	6	[7]
(Israel) A Hadad (Israel) H Levy	7	2	[10]
(Germany) M Berrer (Japan) H Kondo	6	6
(Australia) N Lindahl (Australia) M Matosevic	4	0
WC	(Canada) B Agostinelli (Canada) P Polansky	4	6^{3}
3	(Canada) P-L Duclos (Russia) A Kudryavtsev	6	7
(Canada) V Pospisil (Canada) M Raonic	6	7
(United States) R DeHeart (South Korea) K-t Im	4	5
(Ukraine) S Bubka (Japan) T Matsui	6^{10}	6	[10]
2	(United Kingdom) C Fleming (United Kingdom) K Skupski	7	3	[12]

Quarterfinals
1	(Thailand) Sa Ratiwatana (Thailand) So Ratiwatana	6	6
(United States) L Cook (United States) M Yani	4	4
(Italy) L D'Agord (Brazil) R Grilli	2	2
(Israel) A Hadad (Israel) H Levy	6	6
(Germany) M Berrer (Japan) H Kondo	6	4	[10]
3	(Canada) P-L Duclos (Russia) A Kudryavtsev	4	6	[6]
(Canada) V Pospisil (Canada) M Raonic	4	6	[6]
2	(United Kingdom) C Fleming (United Kingdom) K Skupski	6	3	[10]

Semifinals
1	(Thailand) Sa Ratiwatana (Thailand) So Ratiwatana	2	7	[7]
(Israel) A Hadad (Israel) H Levy	6	6^{2}	[10]
(Germany) M Berrer (Japan) H Kondo	7	1	[8]
2	(United Kingdom) C Fleming (United Kingdom) K Skupski	6^{5}	6	[10]

Finals
(Israel) A Hadad (Israel) H Levy	3	6^{6}
2	(United Kingdom) C Fleming (United Kingdom) K Skupski	6	7
