= 2016 Challenger Banque Nationale de Granby – Women's singles =

Women's singles
- 2016 Challenger Banque Nationale de Granby

Final
- Champion: (United States) Jennifer Brady
- Runner-up: (Belarus) Olga Govortsova
- Score: 7–5, 6–2

Events
| Singles | men | women |
| Doubles | men | women |
- Challenger de Granby

Johanna Konta was the defending champion, but decided not to participate this year.

Jennifer Brady won the title, defeating Olga Govortsova 7–5, 6–2 in the final.

== Seeds ==
1. (Israel) Julia Glushko (first round)
2. (United States) Jessica Pegula (first round)
3. (United States) Jennifer Brady (champion)
4. (Japan) Hiroko Kuwata (first round)
5. (Czech Republic) Barbora Štefková (quarterfinals)
6. (Belarus) Olga Govortsova (final)
7. (United States) Asia Muhammad (first round)
8. (Serbia) Jovana Jakšić (first round)

== Draw ==
Key

- Q = Qualifier
- WC = Wild card
- LL = Lucky loser
- Alt = Alternate
- ITF = ITF entry
- PR = Protected ranking
- SR = Special ranking
- SE = Special exempt
- JE = Junior exempt
- JR = Junior Accelerator Programme entrant
- CO = College Accelerator Programme entrant
- NG = Next Gen Accelerator Program entrant
- w/o = Walkover
- r = Retired
- d = Defaulted

=== Finals ===
Semifinals
(United States) Melanie Oudin | 0 | 6^{2}
6 | (Belarus) Olga Govortsova | 6 | 7^{7}
3 | (United States) Jennifer Brady | 7 | 6
(Canada) Aleksandra Wozniak | 5 | 1

Final
6 | (Belarus) Olga Govortsova | 5 | 2
3 | (United States) Jennifer Brady | 7 | 6

=== Top half ===
First round
1 | (Israel) J Glushko | 5 | 0
(United States) L Albanese | 7 | 6
(Italy) C Ferrando | 3 | 3
(United States) M Oudin | 6 | 6
PR | (United Kingdom) S Murray | 6 | 5 | 6^{2}
(United States) E Halbauer | 3 | 7 | 7^{7}
WC | (Canada) E Routliffe | 5 | 2
5 | (Czech Republic) B Štefková | 7 | 6
4 | (Japan) H Kuwata | 3 | 3
(Canada) F Abanda | 6 | 6
PR | (Japan) M Imanishi | 2 | 4
WC | (Canada) B Andreescu | 6 | 6
(France) C Roméo | 6 | 3 | 5
(Canada) C Zhao | 3 | 6 | 7
WC | (Canada) C Robillard-Millette | 2 | 3
6 | (Belarus) O Govortsova | 6 | 6

Second round
(United States) L Albanese | 2 | 6 | 6^{2}
(United States) M Oudin | 6 | 2 | 7^{7}
(United States) E Halbauer | 4 | 2
5 | (Czech Republic) B Štefková | 6 | 6
(Canada) F Abanda | 7 | 7^{7}
WC | (Canada) B Andreescu | 5 | 6^{5}
(Canada) C Zhao | 1 | 1
6 | (Belarus) O Govortsova | 6 | 6

Quarterfinals
(United States) M Oudin | 7^{7} | 4 | 6
5 | (Czech Republic) B Štefková | 6^{3} | 6 | 3
(Canada) F Abanda | 0 | 1
6 | (Belarus) O Govortsova | 6 | 6

Semifinals
(United States) M Oudin | 0 | 6^{2}
6 | (Belarus) O Govortsova | 6 | 7^{7}

=== Bottom half ===
First round
8 | (Serbia) J Jakšić | 3 | 2
(Belgium) G Minnen | 6 | 6
Q | (United States) J Wacnik | 1 | 2
Q | (United States) A Stevenson | 6 | 6
(United States) M Sanchez | 6 | 4 | 6
WC | (Canada) M-A Leduc | 2 | 6 | 2
Q | (United States) N Melichar | 3 | 4
3 | (United States) J Brady | 6 | 6
7 | (United States) A Muhammad | 6 | 2 | 3
(United States) J Loeb | 0 | 6 | 6
(Canada) A Wozniak | 6 | 6
Q | (Canada) C Leduc | 2 | 2
(Mexico) V Rodríguez | 3 | 6 | 3
(Japan) M Ayukawa | 6 | 3 | 6
(Belgium) A-S Mestach | 4 | 6 | 6
2 | (United States) J Pegula | 6 | 3 | 2

Second round
(Belgium) G Minnen | 7 | 2 | 7^{7}
Q | (United States) A Stevenson | 5 | 6 | 6^{4}
(United States) M Sanchez | 2 | 2
3 | (United States) J Brady | 6 | 6
(United States) J Loeb | 2 | 6 | 0
(Canada) A Wozniak | 6 | 0 | 6
(Japan) M Ayukawa | 3 | 1
(Belgium) A-S Mestach | 6 | 6

Quarterfinals
(Belgium) G Minnen | 5 | 6 | 6^{2}
3 | (United States) J Brady | 7 | 4 | 7^{7}
(Canada) A Wozniak | 6 | 6
(Belgium) A-S Mestach | 1 | 3

Semifinals
3 | (United States) J Brady | 7 | 6
(Canada) A Wozniak | 5 | 1
