= 2011 Challenger Banque Nationale de Granby – Women's doubles =

Women's doubles
- 2011 Challenger Banque Nationale de Granby

Final
- Champions: (Canada) Sharon Fichman (China) Sun Shengnan
- Runners-up: (Belarus) Viktoryia Kisialeva (Brazil) Nathalia Rossi
- Score: 6–4, 6–2

Events
Singles	men	women
Doubles	men	women
Challenger de Granby	· 2012 →

Sharon Fichman and Sun Shengnan won the title, defeating Viktoryia Kisialeva and Nathalia Rossi 6–4, 6–2 in the final.

== Seeds ==
1. (Canada) Sharon Fichman / (China) Sun Shengnan (champions)
2. (United States) Amanda Fink / (United States) Elizabeth Lumpkin (semifinals)
3. (Israel) Julia Glushko / (Australia) Tammi Patterson (first round)
4. (Japan) Remi Tezuka / (Hong Kong) Zhang Ling (first round)

== Draw ==
=== Key ===
- Q = Qualifier
- WC = Wild card
- LL = Lucky loser
- Alt = Alternate
- SE = Special exempt
- PR = Protected ranking
- ITF = ITF entry
- JE = Junior exempt
- w/o = Walkover
- r = Retired
- d = Defaulted
- SR = Special ranking

=== Draw ===
First round
1	(Canada) S Fichman (China) S Sun	6	6
(United States) E Ferris (Russia) N Kukharchuk	2	4
(Germany) K Grajdek (United States) L Litvak	6	4	[10]
(Canada) E Abanda (Canada) C Zhao	4	6	[5]
4	(Japan) R Tezuka (Hong Kong) L Zhang	1	6	[3]
(Canada) G Dabrowski (United States) EJ Harman	6	3	[10]
WC	(Canada) E Fournier (Canada) E Routliffe	3	4
(United States) J Elie (United States) W Jones	6	6
(Belarus) V Kisialeva (Brazil) N Rossi	7^{7}	2	[10]
WC	(Canada) P Januskova (Canada) S Molnar	6^{3}	6	[7]
(Japan) A Nakamura (Japan) A Yonemura	6	7
3	(Israel) J Glushko (Australia) T Patterson	3	5
(Canada) E Bouchard (South Africa) C Simmonds	6	6
WC	(Canada) M Jodoin (Canada) B Wowchuk	3	4
(United States) Y Allen (United States) E Clark	1	2
2	(United States) A Fink (United States) E Lumpkin	6	6

Quarterfinals
1	(Canada) S Fichman (China) S Sun	6	6
(Germany) K Grajdek (United States) L Litvak	3	4
(Canada) G Dabrowski (United States) EJ Harman	5	6	[12]
(United States) J Elie (United States) W Jones	7	3	[10
(Belarus) V Kisialeva (Brazil) N Rossi	3	6	[10]
(Japan) A Nakamura (Japan) A Yonemura	6	2	[5]
(Canada) E Bouchard (South Africa) C Simmonds	2	2
2	(United States) A Fink (United States) E Lumpkin	6	6

Semifinals
1	(Canada) S Fichman (China) S Sun	6	7
(Canada) G Dabrowski (United States) EJ Harman	1	5
(Belarus) V Kisialeva (Brazil) N Rossi	6	6^{5}	[14]
2	(United States) A Fink (United States) E Lumpkin	4	7^{7}	[12]

Final
1	(Canada) S Fichman (China) S Sun	6	6
(Belarus) V Kisialeva (Brazil) N Rossi	4	2
