= 2011 Challenger Banque Nationale de Granby – Women's singles =

Women's singles
- 2011 Challenger Banque Nationale de Granby

Final
- Champions: (Canada) Stéphanie Dubois
- Runners-up: (Hong Kong) Zhang Ling
- Score: 6–2, 2–6, 6–1

Events
Singles	men	women
Doubles	men	women
Challenger de Granby	· 2012 →

This was a new event in the 2011 ITF Women's Circuit.
Stéphanie Dubois won the title, defeating Zhang Ling 6–2, 2–6, 6–1 in the final.

== Seeds ==
1. (Canada) Stéphanie Dubois (champion)
2. (Ukraine) Tetiana Luzhanska (semifinals)
3. (Israel) Julia Glushko (semifinals)
4. (Hong Kong) Zhang Ling (final)
5. (Canada) Sharon Fichman (quarterfinals)
6. (South Africa) Chanel Simmonds (second round)
7. (Chinese Taipei) Hsu Wen-hsin (quarterfinals)
8. (China) Sun Shengnan (quarterfinals)

== Main draw ==
=== Key ===
- Q = Qualifier
- WC = Wild card
- LL = Lucky loser
- Alt = Alternate
- SE = Special exempt
- PR = Protected ranking
- ITF = ITF entry
- JE = Junior exempt
- w/o = Walkover
- r = Retired
- d = Defaulted
- SR = Special ranking

=== Finals ===
Semifinals
1	(Canada) Stéphanie Dubois	6	6
3	(Israel) Julia Glushko	3	2
4	(Hong Kong) Zhang Ling	6	7
2	(Ukraine) Tetiana Luzhanska	2	5

Final
1	(Canada) Stéphanie Dubois	6	2	6
4	(Hong Kong) Zhang Ling	2	6	1

=== Top half ===
First round
1	(Canada) S Dubois	6	6
Q	(United States) D Ospina	2	1
(United States) M Falcon	4	3
(United States) L Litvak	6	6
LL	(Canada) K-A Surin	3	2
Q	(United States) K Ruckert	6	6
Q	(Russia) N Kukharchuk	2	1
7	(Chinese Taipei) W-h Hsu	6	6
3	(Israel) J Glushko	6	6
WC	(Canada) C Zhao	0	2
(Canada) G Dabrowski	6	6
Q	(Canada) E Fournier	3	4
(Japan) A Yonemura	7^{7}	6^{6}	5
WC	(Canada) B Wowchuk	6^{3}	7^{8}	7
(Australia) T Patterson	4	5
5	(Canada) S Fichman	6	7

Second round
1	(Canada) S Dubois	7	6
(United States) L Litvak	5	1
Q	(United States) K Ruckert	1	2
7	(Chinese Taipei) W-h Hsu	6	6
3	(Israel) J Glushko	6	6
(Canada) G Dabrowski	3	2
WC	(Canada) B Wowchuk	1	0
5	(Canada) S Fichman	6	6

Quarterfinals
1	(Canada) S Dubois	6	6
7	(Chinese Taipei) W-h Hsu	2	1
3	(Israel) J Glushko	2	6	6
5	(Canada) S Fichman	6	3	4

Semifinals
1	(Canada) S Dubois	6	6
3	(Israel) J Glushko	3	2

=== Bottom half ===
First round
6	(South Africa) C Simmonds	6	6
(Brazil) N Rossi	3	2
(United States) J Elie	7^{7}	6
(United States) A Fink	6^{2}	2
(Canada) E Bouchard	6	6
(Japan) R Tezuka	4	1
Q	(United States) E Lumpkin	6^{3}	6	1
4	(Hong Kong) L Zhang	7^{7}	4	6
8	(China) S Sun	6	6
WC	(Canada) S Molnar	1	4
Q	(Canada) M Jodoin	7^{7}	6
Q	(United States) W Jones	6^{5}	3
(Japan) A Nakamura	7	7
WC	(Canada) E Abanda	5	5
Q	(Germany) K Grajdek	3	0
2	(Ukraine) T Luzhanska	6	6

Second round
6	(South Africa) C Simmonds	7	5	6^{3}
(United States) J Elie	5	7	7^{7}
(Canada) E Bouchard	7^{7}	5	5
4	(Hong Kong) L Zhang	6^{3}	7	7
8	(China) S Sun	7^{7}	7
Q	(Canada) M Jodoin	6^{2}	5
(Japan) A Nakamura	2	5
2	(Ukraine) T Luzhanska	6	7

Quarterfinals
(United States) J Elie	3	0
4	(Hong Kong) L Zhang	6	6
8	(China) S Sun	4	3
2	(Ukraine) T Luzhanska	6	6

Semifinals
4	(Hong Kong) L Zhang	6	7
2	(Ukraine) T Luzhanska	2	5
