= 2012 Challenger Banque Nationale de Granby – Men's doubles =

Men's doubles
- 2012 Challenger Banque Nationale de Granby

Final
- Champions: (Canada) Philip Bester (Canada) Vasek Pospisil
- Runners-up: (Japan) Yuichi Ito (Japan) Takuto Niki
- Score: 6–1, 6–2

Events
Singles	men	women
Doubles	men	women
← 2011 ·	Challenger de Granby	· 2013 →

Karol Beck and Édouard Roger-Vasselin were the defending champions but decided not to participate.
Philip Bester and Vasek Pospisil won the title, defeating Yuichi Ito and Takuto Niki 6–1, 6–2 in the final.

== Seeds ==
1. (Australia) John Peers / (Thailand) Danai Udomchoke (semifinals)
2. (Belgium) Maxime Authom / (Netherlands) Igor Sijsling (semifinals)
3. (Japan) Yuichi Ito / (Japan) Takuto Niki (final)
4. (France) Charles-Antoine Brézac / (Italy) Riccardo Ghedin (quarterfinals)

== Draw ==
=== Key ===
- Q = Qualifier
- WC = Wild card
- LL = Lucky loser
- Alt = Alternate
- ITF = ITF entry
- PR = Protected ranking
- SR = Special ranking
- SE = Special exempt
- JE = Junior exempt
- JR = Junior Accelerator Programme entrant
- CO = College Accelerator Programme entrant
- NG = Next Gen Accelerator Program entrant
- w/o = Walkover
- r = Retired
- d = Defaulted

=== Draw ===
First round
1	(Australia) J Peers (Thailand) D Udomchoke	6	7
(Canada) F Peliwo (Canada) Milan Pokrajac	2	5
(Australia) J Duckworth (Australia) M Reid	6	7
WC	(Canada) Hugo di Feo (Canada) Pavel Krainik	4	5
3	(Japan) Y Ito (Japan) Takuto Niki	6	5	[10]
(United States) Reid Carleton (United States) Daniel Stahl	2	7	[5]
(Moldova) R Borvanov (France) Clément Reix	6	6
WC	(Canada) É Chvojka (Canada) P Gubenco	1	2
(Canada) P Bester (Canada) V Pospisil	7^{7}	6
(Canada) F Dancevic (Japan) Y Uchiyama	6^{5}	4
(United States) El Mihdawy (United States) K Kim	0	3
4	(France) Charles-Antoine Brézac (Italy) R Ghedin	6	6
WC	(Canada) Isade Juneau (Canada) Samuel Monette	2	6^{4}
(United Kingdom) R Bloomfield (Japan) T Matsui	6	7^{7}
(United States) D Kosakowski (United States) B Strode	2	4
2	(Belgium) M Authom (Netherlands) I Sijsling	6	6

Quarterfinals
1	(Australia) J Peers (Thailand) D Udomchoke	w/o
(Australia) J Duckworth (Australia) M Reid
3	(Japan) Y Ito (Japan) Takuto Niki	6	6
(Moldova) R Borvanov (France) Clément Reix	0	2
(Canada) P Bester (Canada) V Pospisil	6	6
4	(France) Charles-Antoine Brézac (Italy) R Ghedin	1	3
(United Kingdom) R Bloomfield (Japan) T Matsui	4	4
2	(Belgium) M Authom (Netherlands) I Sijsling	6	6

Semifinals
1	(Australia) J Peers (Thailand) D Udomchoke	5	2
3	(Japan) Y Ito (Japan) Takuto Niki	7	6
(Canada) P Bester (Canada) V Pospisil	7	6
2	(Belgium) M Authom (Netherlands) I Sijsling	5	3

Final
3	(Japan) Y Ito (Japan) Takuto Niki	1	2
(Canada) P Bester (Canada) V Pospisil	6	6
