= 2011 Challenger Banque Nationale de Granby – Men's doubles =

Men's doubles
- 2011 Challenger Banque Nationale de Granby

Final
- Champions: (Slovakia) Karol Beck (France) Édouard Roger-Vasselin
- Runners-up: (Germany) Matthias Bachinger (Germany) Frank Moser
- Score: 6–1, 6–3

Events
Singles	men	women
Doubles	men	women
← 2010 ·	Challenger de Granby	· 2012 →

Frederik Nielsen and Joseph Sirianni were the defending champions, but decided not to participate.
Karol Beck and Édouard Roger-Vasselin won the title, defeating Matthias Bachinger and Frank Moser 6–1, 6–3 in the final.

== Seeds ==
1. (China) Gong Maoxin / (China) Li Zhe (semifinals)
2. (Germany) Matthias Bachinger / (Germany) Frank Moser (final)
3. (Slovakia) Karol Beck / (France) Édouard Roger-Vasselin (champions)
4. (United States) Jesse Levine / (Canada) Vasek Pospisil (semifinals)

== Draw ==
=== Key ===
- Q = Qualifier
- WC = Wild card
- LL = Lucky loser
- Alt = Alternate
- SE = Special exempt
- PR = Protected ranking
- ITF = ITF entry
- JE = Junior exempt
- w/o = Walkover
- r = Retired
- d = Defaulted
- SR = Special ranking

=== Draw ===
First round
1	(China) M Gong (China) Z Li	6	6
(Canada) É Chvojka (Canada) Kamil Pajkowski	4	3
WC	(Canada) Samuel Monette (Canada) F Peliwo	1	1
WC	(Canada) S Diez (Canada) Zachary White	6	6
3	(Slovakia) K Beck (France) É Roger-Vasselin	6	6
WC	(Canada) Sebastian Jacques (Canada) Yoann Re	4	4
(Australia) G Jones (Australia) Mark Verryth	3	3
(France) Antoine Benneteau (France) N Mahut	6	6
(France) Clément Reix (France) M Rodrigues	4	2
(Israel) H Levy (Israel) D Sela	6	6
(United Kingdom) R Bloomfield (Germany) S Stadler	2	2
4	(United States) J Levine (Canada) V Pospisil	6	6
(United Kingdom) D Cox (United Kingdom) J Milton	2
(United States) Andrew Dzulynsky (United States) John Valenti	0^{r}
(United States) Peter Aarts (United States) James Ludlow	5	4
2	(Germany) M Bachinger (Germany) F Moser	7	6

Quarterfinals
1	(China) M Gong (China) Z Li	6	7
WC	(Canada) S Diez (Canada) Z White	1	5
3	(Slovakia) K Beck (France) É Roger-Vasselin	7	6
(France) Antoine Benneteau (France) N Mahut	5	2
(Israel) H Levy (Israel) D Sela	3	4
4	(United States) J Levine (Canada) V Pospisil	6	6
(United Kingdom) D Cox (United Kingdom) J Milton	2	4
2	(Germany) M Bachinger (Germany) F Moser	6	6

Semifinals
1	(China) M Gong (China) Z Li	0	4
3	(Slovakia) K Beck (France) É Roger-Vasselin	6	6
4	(United States) J Levine (Canada) V Pospisil
2	(Germany) M Bachinger (Germany) F Moser	w/o

Final
3	(Slovakia) K Beck (France) É Roger-Vasselin	6	6
2	(Germany) M Bachinger (Germany) F Moser	1	3
