= 2009 Challenger Banque Nationale de Granby – Singles =

Singles
- 2009 Challenger Banque Nationale de Granby

Final
- Champion: (Belgium) Xavier Malisse
- Runner-up: (South Africa) Kevin Anderson
- Score: 6–4, 6–4

Events
Singles	Doubles
← 2008 ·	Challenger de Granby	· 2010 →

Alex Bogdanovic didn't attempt to defend his 2008 title.
Xavier Malisse won in the final 6–4, 6–4, against Kevin Anderson.

== Seeds ==
1. (Germany) Michael Berrer (first round)
2. (United States) Michael Russell (second round)
3. (United States) Brendan Evans (first round)
4. (South Africa) Kevin Anderson (final)
5. (Israel) Harel Levy (first round)
6. (Ukraine) Sergei Bubka (first round)
7. (Australia) Marinko Matosevic (second round)
8. (Russia) Alexandre Kudryavtsev (first round)

== Draw ==
=== Key ===
- Q = Qualifier
- WC = Wild card
- LL = Lucky loser
- Alt = Alternate
- SE = Special exempt
- PR = Protected ranking
- ITF = ITF entry
- JE = Junior exempt
- w/o = Walkover
- r = Retired
- d = Defaulted
- SR = Special ranking

=== Final four ===
Semifinals
(Canada) Peter Polansky	6^{1}	7	3
4	(South Africa) Kevin Anderson	7	6^{3}	6
(United States) Ryler DeHeart	4	4
(Belgium) Xavier Malisse	6	6

Final
4	(South Africa) Kevin Anderson	4	4
(Belgium) Xavier Malisse	6	6

=== Top half ===
First round
1	(Germany) M Berrer	5	0
Q	(Germany) T Kamke	7	6
(Venezuela) J de Armas	5	4
(Canada) P Polansky	7	6
WC	(Canada) M Raonic	6^{3}	1
(Japan) Y Sugita	7	6
Q	(United States) L Cook	7	7
5	(Israel) H Levy	6^{6}	6^{5}
4	(South Africa) K Anderson	7	6^{5}	7
SE	(United Kingdom) D Evans	5	7	6^{3}
(United States) T Widom	7	6
WC	(Canada) B Agostinelli	6^{4}	4
(France) V Millot	4	5
(United States) M Yani	6	7
WC	(Canada) F Niemeyer	6	6
8	(Russia) A Kudryavtsev	0	1

Second round
Q	(Germany) T Kamke	6^{5}	4
(Canada) P Polansky	7	6
(Japan) Y Sugita	4	6	3
Q	(United States) L Cook	6	2	6
4	(South Africa) K Anderson	7	7
(United States) T Widom	6^{3}	5
(United States) M Yani	3	4
WC	(Canada) F Niemeyer	6	6

Quarterfinals
(Canada) P Polansky	5	6	6
Q	(United States) L Cook	7	3	4
4	(South Africa) K Anderson	6	6
WC	(Canada) F Niemeyer	4	0

Semifinals
(Canada) P Polansky	6^{1}	7	3
4	(South Africa) K Anderson	7	6^{3}	6

=== Bottom half ===
First round
7	(Australia) M Matosevic	6	6
Q	(Japan) H Kondo	4	4
(United States) J Witten	1	6	6
(Germany) S Stadler	6	1	4
(United States) R DeHeart	6	6
(Italy) L D'Agord	2	4
(Canada) P-L Duclos	6	1	7
3	(United States) B Evans	2	6	5
6	(Ukraine) S Bubka	3	3
(Australia) N Lindahl	6	6
(South Korea) K-t Im	4	6	7
(Japan) T Ito	6	1	5
Q	(Japan) T Matsui	1	3
(Belgium) X Malisse	6	6
WC	(Canada) V Pospisil	3	6	3
2	(United States) M Russell	6	3	6

Second round
7	(Australia) M Matosevic	2	4
(United States) J Witten	6	6
(United States) R DeHeart	7	7
(Canada) P-L Duclos	5	5
(Australia) N Lindahl	3	6	4
(South Korea) K-t Im	6	3	6
(Belgium) X Malisse	7	6
2	(United States) M Russell	6^{5}	4

Quarterfinals
(United States) J Witten	1	2
(United States) R DeHeart	6	6
(South Korea) K-t Im	3	3
(Belgium) X Malisse	6	6

Semifinals
(United States) R DeHeart	4	4
(Belgium) X Malisse	6	6
