= 2012 Challenger Banque Nationale de Granby – Women's doubles =

Women's doubles
- 2012 Challenger Banque Nationale de Granby

Final
- Champions: (Canada) Sharon Fichman (Canada) Marie-Ève Pelletier
- Runners-up: (Japan) Shuko Aoyama (Japan) Miki Miyamura
- Score: 4–6, 7–5, [10–4]

Events
Singles	men	women
Doubles	men	women
← 2011 ·	Challenger de Granby	· 2013 →

Sharon Fichman and Sun Shengnan were the defending champions, but Sun decided not to participate this year.

Fichman partnered with Marie-Ève Pelletier and successfully defended her title, defeating Shuko Aoyama and Miki Miyamura 4–6, 7–5, [10–4] in the final.

== Seeds ==
1. (Canada) Sharon Fichman / (Canada) Marie-Ève Pelletier (champions)
2. (Japan) Shuko Aoyama / (Japan) Miki Miyamura (final)
3. (France) Victoria Larrière / (United States) Alison Riske (first round)
4. (Canada) Gabriela Dabrowski / (Israel) Keren Shlomo (quarterfinals)

== Draw ==
=== Key ===
- Q = Qualifier
- WC = Wild card
- LL = Lucky loser
- Alt = Alternate
- SE = Special exempt
- PR = Protected ranking
- ITF = ITF entry
- JE = Junior exempt
- w/o = Walkover
- r = Retired
- d = Defaulted
- SR = Special ranking

First round
1	(Canada) S Fichman (Canada) M-È Pelletier	7	6
(Canada) E Bouchard (United States) A Mueller	5	3
WC	(France) J Coin (Canada) S Dubois	6	3	[6]
(Japan) M Eguchi (Israel) J Glushko	3	6	[10]
3	(France) V Larrière (United States) A Riske	6	3	[4]
WC	(Canada) F Abanda (Canada) C Petrick	2	6	[10]
(Russia) N Kukharchuk (The Bahamas) S Pratt	4	1
(United States) E Clark (Austria) N Rottmann	6	6
(United States) J Elie (United States) C-y Hsu	1	6	[10]
WC	(Canada) M Jodoin (Canada) S Molnar	6	4	[6]
(United Kingdom) L Deigman (Republic of Ireland) J Moriarty	3	0
4	(Canada) G Dabrowski (Israel) K Shlomo	6	6
(Canada) E Routliffe (Canada) C Zhao	2	4
(Poland) J Jegiołka (United States) L Litvak	6	6
(United States) S Krywacz (United States) D Mills	0	2
2	(Japan) S Aoyama (Japan) M Miyamura	6	6

Quarterfinals
1	(Canada) S Fichman (Canada) M-È Pelletier	1	7^{7}	[10]
(Japan) M Eguchi (Israel) J Glushko	6	6^{4}	[7]
WC	(Canada) F Abanda (Canada) C Petrick	7^{7}	4	[10]
(United States) E Clark (Austria) N Rottmann	6^{4}	6	[5]
(United States) J Elie (United States) C-y Hsu	6	6
4	(Canada) G Dabrowski (Israel) K Shlomo	1	3
(Poland) J Jegiołka (United States) L Litvak	4	6	[8]
2	(Japan) S Aoyama (Japan) M Miyamura	6	4	[10]

Semifinals
1	(Canada) S Fichman (Canada) M-È Pelletier	7^{7}	6
WC	(Canada) F Abanda (Canada) C Petrick	6^{4}	4
(United States) J Elie (United States) C-y Hsu	3	2
2	(Japan) S Aoyama (Japan) M Miyamura	6	6

Final
1	(Canada) S Fichman (Canada) M-È Pelletier	4	7	[10]
2	(Japan) S Aoyama (Japan) M Miyamura	6	5	[4]
