= 2014 Challenger Banque Nationale de Granby – Men's singles =

Men's singles
- 2014 Challenger Banque Nationale de Granby

Final
- Champion: (Japan) Hiroki Moriya
- Runner-up: (France) Fabrice Martin
- Score: 7–5, 6–7^{(4–7)}, 6–3

Events
Singles	men	women
Doubles	men	women
- Challenger de Granby

Frank Dancevic was the defending champion, but decided to compete for the Philadelphia Freedoms of the World TeamTennis instead.

Hiroki Moriya won the title, defeating Fabrice Martin 7–5, 6–7^{(4–7)}, 6–3 in the final.

== Seeds ==
1. (Slovakia) Lukáš Lacko (second round)
2. (Tunisia) Malek Jaziri (second round)
3. (Japan) Hiroki Moriya (champion)
4. (Belgium) Ruben Bemelmans (first round)
5. (Australia) Luke Saville (quarterfinals, retired)
6. (United States) Chase Buchanan (quarterfinals)
7. (France) Vincent Millot (quarterfinals)
8. (Republic of Ireland) James McGee (semifinals)

== Draw ==
Key

- Q = Qualifier
- WC = Wild card
- LL = Lucky loser
- Alt = Alternate
- ITF = ITF entry
- PR = Protected ranking
- SR = Special ranking
- SE = Special exempt
- JE = Junior exempt
- JR = Junior Accelerator Programme entrant
- CO = College Accelerator Programme entrant
- NG = Next Gen Accelerator Program entrant
- w/o = Walkover
- r = Retired
- d = Defaulted

=== Finals ===
Semifinals
8	(Republic of Ireland) James McGee	2	7	3
3	(Japan) Hiroki Moriya	6	5	6
(France) Fabrice Martin	6	6
(Australia) Benjamin Mitchell	3	2

Final
3	(Japan) Hiroki Moriya	7	6^{4}	6
(France) Fabrice Martin	5	7^{7}	3

=== Top half ===
First round
1	(Slovakia) L Lacko	6	1	7
WC	(Canada) É Chvojka	4	6	5
Q	(Canada) Pavel Krainik	4	5
(United Kingdom) Richard Gabb	6	7
(United States) M Shabaz	4	1
(United States) E Quigley	6	6
(New Zealand) M Daniell	3	4
8	(Republic of Ireland) J McGee	6	6
3	(Japan) H Moriya	5	6	1
Q	(Australia) J Kerr	7	2	0^{r}
Q	(Ecuador) G Escobar	7^{7}	6^{2}	6^{6}
(United States) A El Mihdawy	6^{3}	7^{7}	7^{8}
(United States) J Jung	6	6
(Canada) S Diez	2	4
(South Africa) F Wolmarans	5	6	4
7	(France) V Millot	7	4	6

Second round
1	(Slovakia) L Lacko	6	1	2
(United Kingdom) R Gabb	3	6	6
(United States) E Quigley	4	2
8	(Republic of Ireland) J McGee	6	6
3	(Japan) H Moriya	7^{7}	6^{4}	6
(United States) A El Mihdawy	6^{2}	7^{7}	3
(United States) J Jung	3	5
7	(France) V Millot	6	7

Quarterfinals
(United Kingdom) R Gabb	3	4
8	(Republic of Ireland) J McGee	6	6
3	(Japan) H Moriya	7	4	7^{7}
7	(France) V Millot	5	6	6^{0}

Semifinals
8	(Republic of Ireland) J McGee	2	7	3
3	(Japan) H Moriya	6	5	6

=== Bottom half ===
First round
6	(United States) C Buchanan	6	6
(Canada) P Bester	4	0
(Canada) F Peliwo	3	6	6
WC	(Canada) Isade Juneau	6	3	3
(Japan) Yuya Kibi	6^{3}	3
WC	(Canada) B Schnur	7^{7}	6
(France) F Martin	6	7^{7}
4	(Belgium) R Bemelmans	4	6^{4}
5	(Australia) L Saville	7^{7}	7^{7}
WC	(Canada) Tommy Mylnikov	6^{3}	6^{5}
(Monaco) B Balleret	6	6
(Venezuela) LD Martínez	4	2
(Australia) B Mitchell	6	6^{4}	6
(Switzerland) A Bossel	1	7^{7}	1
Q	(Canada) Osama Zoghlami	2	1
2	(Tunisia) M Jaziri	6	6

Second round
6	(United States) C Buchanan	6	6
(Canada) F Peliwo	1	2
WC	(Canada) B Schnur	6^{5}	2
(France) F Martin	7^{7}	6
5	(Australia) L Saville	6	6
(Monaco) B Balleret	4	3
(Australia) B Mitchell	6^{3}	7^{7}	6
2	(Tunisia) M Jaziri	7^{7}	6^{5}	1

Quarterfinals
6	(United States) C Buchanan	5	2
(France) F Martin	7	6
5	(Australia) L Saville	3	3^{r}
(Australia) B Mitchell	6	4

Semifinals
(France) F Martin	6	6
(Australia) B Mitchell	3	2
