= 2015 Challenger Banque Nationale de Granby – Women's doubles =

Women's doubles
- 2015 Challenger Banque Nationale de Granby

Final
- Champions: (Australia) Jessica Moore (Australia) Storm Sanders
- Runners-up: (United Kingdom) Laura Robson (Canada) Erin Routliffe
- Score: 7–5, 6–2

Events
Singles	men	women
Doubles	men	women
- Challenger de Granby

Hiroko Kuwata and Riko Sawayanagi were the defending champions, but decided not to participate this year.

Jessica Moore and Storm Sanders won the title, defeating Laura Robson and Erin Routliffe 7–5, 6–2 in the final.

== Seeds ==
1. (United Kingdom) Johanna Konta / (United Kingdom) Emily Webley-Smith (quarterfinals)
2. (United Kingdom) Naomi Broady / (France) Amandine Hesse (semifinals)
3. (France) Julie Coin / (France) Stéphanie Foretz (quarterfinals)
4. (Israel) Julia Glushko / (Australia) Olivia Rogowska (quarterfinals)

== Draw ==
Key

- Q = Qualifier
- WC = Wild card
- LL = Lucky loser
- Alt = Alternate
- ITF = ITF entry
- PR = Protected ranking
- SR = Special ranking
- SE = Special exempt
- JE = Junior exempt
- JR = Junior Accelerator Programme entrant
- CO = College Accelerator Programme entrant
- NG = Next Gen Accelerator Program entrant
- w/o = Walkover
- r = Retired
- d = Defaulted

First round
1	(United Kingdom) J Konta (United Kingdom) E Webley-Smith	6	6
(Mexico) V Rodríguez (Mexico) M Zacarías	3	2
(Japan) A Inoue (Japan) M Inoue	6	6^{6}	[10]
(Canada) M-A Leduc (Canada) C Robillard-Millette	2	7^{8}	[3]
3	(France) J Coin (France) S Foretz	6	6
WC	(Canada) M Drake (Canada) M Patrascu	1	2
(Australia) J Moore (Australia) S Sanders	4	6	[10]
(United States) A Mueller (Canada) C Zhao	6	1	[5]
WC	(United Kingdom) L Robson (Canada) E Routliffe	5	7^{8}	[11]
(Chinese Taipei) C-y Hsu (Czech Republic) B Štefková	7	6^{6}	[9]
(Canada) A Broomfield (Canada) S Molnar	2	1
4	(Israel) J Glushko (Australia) O Rogowska	6	6
(United States) E Halbauer (Canada) P Januskova	2	7	[3]
(United States) D Lao (United States) K Wong	6	5	[10]
(United States) L Albanese (Chile) A Guarachi	5	7^{7}	[6]
2	(United Kingdom) N Broady (France) A Hesse	7	6^{5}	[10]

Quarterfinals
1	(United Kingdom) J Konta (United Kingdom) E Webley-Smith	4	7^{7}	[8]
(Japan) A Inoue (Japan) M Inoue	6	6^{4}	[10]
3	(France) J Coin (France) S Foretz	3	7^{7}	[7]
(Australia) J Moore (Australia) S Sanders	6	6^{2}	[10]
WC	(United Kingdom) L Robson (Canada) E Routliffe	4	7^{7}	[10]
4	(Israel) J Glushko (Australia) O Rogowska	6	6^{3}	[5]
(United States) D Lao (United States) K Wong	1	6^{5}
2	(United Kingdom) N Broady (France) A Hesse	6	7^{7}

Semifinals
(Japan) A Inoue (Japan) M Inoue	6	3	[6]
(Australia) J Moore (Australia) S Sanders	4	6	[10]
WC	(United Kingdom) L Robson (Canada) E Routliffe	7^{7}	7
2	(United Kingdom) N Broady (France) A Hesse	6^{4}	5

Final
(Australia) J Moore (Australia) S Sanders	7	6
WC	(United Kingdom) L Robson (Canada) E Routliffe	5	2
