= 2016 Challenger Banque Nationale de Granby – Men's doubles =

Men's doubles
- 2016 Challenger Banque Nationale de Granby

Final
- Champion: (Brazil) Guilherme Clezar (Colombia) Alejandro González
- Runner-up: (India) Saketh Myneni (India) Sanam Singh
- Score: 3–6, 6–1, [12–10]

Events
Singles	men	women
Doubles	men	women
- Challenger de Granby

Philip Bester and Peter Polansky were the defending champions, but lost in the semifinals to Guilherme Clezar and Alejandro González.

Clezar and González won the title, defeating Saketh Myneni and Sanam Singh 3–6, 6–1, [12–10] in the final.

== Seeds ==
1. (United States) Sekou Bangoura / (Republic of Ireland) David O'Hare (first round)
2. (Australia) Jarryd Chaplin / (United States) Mitchell Krueger (semifinals)
3. (India) Saketh Myneni / (India) Sanam Singh (final)
4. (Canada) Philip Bester / (Canada) Peter Polansky (semifinals)

== Draw ==
Key

- Q = Qualifier
- WC = Wild card
- LL = Lucky loser
- Alt = Alternate
- ITF = ITF entry
- PR = Protected ranking
- SR = Special ranking
- SE = Special exempt
- JE = Junior exempt
- JR = Junior Accelerator Programme entrant
- CO = College Accelerator Programme entrant
- NG = Next Gen Accelerator Program entrant
- w/o = Walkover
- r = Retired
- d = Defaulted

First round
1	(United States) S Bangoura (Republic of Ireland) D O'Hare	7^{7}	4	[10]
WC	(Canada) F Auger-Aliassime (Canada) D Shapovalov	6^{4}	6	[12]
(Brazil) G Clezar (Colombia) A González	7^{7}	6
WC	(Canada) F Peliwo (Canada) B Schnur	6^{5}	2
4	(Canada) P Bester (Canada) P Polansky	7	6
(El Salvador) M Arévalo (Ecuador) E Gómez	5	4
(Venezuela) LD Martínez (Colombia) E Struvay	7	7
WC	(Canada) A Galarneau (Canada) Isade Juneau	5	5
(France) T Lamasine (France) V Millot	6	6
(France) G Barrère (France) Q Halys	4	4
(Japan) H Moriya (Japan) Y Uchiyama	4	2
3	(India) S Myneni (India) S Singh	6	6
(United Kingdom) L Broady (United Kingdom) B Klein	7^{7}	7^{7}
(Australia) L Saville (Australia) A Whittington	6^{5}	6^{2}
Alt	(Italy) Erik Crepaldi (Japan) Hiroyasu Ehara	7^{7}	4	[4]
2	(Australia) Jarryd Chaplin (United States) M Krueger	6^{5}	6	[10]

Quarterfinals
WC	(Canada) F Auger-Aliassime (Canada) D Shapovalov	4	6	[7]
(Brazil) G Clezar (Colombia) A González	6	4	[10]
4	(Canada) P Bester (Canada) P Polansky	6	6
(Venezuela) LD Martínez (Colombia) E Struvay	3	2
(France) T Lamasine (France) V Millot	7^{7}	6^{2}	[9]
3	(India) S Myneni (India) S Singh	6^{5}	7^{7}	[11]
(United Kingdom) L Broady (United Kingdom) B Klein	7^{7}	5	[8]
2	(Australia) J Chaplin (United States) M Krueger	6^{1}	7	[10]

Semifinals
(Brazil) G Clezar (Colombia) A González	6	6
4	(Canada) P Bester (Canada) P Polansky	4	2
3	(India) S Myneni (India) S Singh	6	6
2	(Australia) J Chaplin (United States) M Krueger	3	3

Final
(Brazil) G Clezar (Colombia) A González	3	6	[12]
3	(India) S Myneni (India) S Singh	6	1	[10]
