= 2014 Challenger Banque Nationale de Granby – Men's doubles =

Men's doubles
- 2014 Challenger Banque Nationale de Granby

Final
- Champions: (New Zealand) Marcus Daniell (New Zealand) Artem Sitak
- Runners-up: (Australia) Jordan Kerr (France) Fabrice Martin
- Score: 7–6^{(7–5)}, 5–7, [10–5]

Events
Singles	men	women
Doubles	men	women
- Challenger de Granby

Érik Chvojka and Peter Polansky were the defending champions, but Polansky decided not to participate this year. Chvojka partnered with Lukáš Lacko, but lost in the first round to Philip Bester and Brayden Schnur.

Marcus Daniell and Artem Sitak won the title, defeating Jordan Kerr and Fabrice Martin 7–6^{(7–5)}, 5–7, [10–5] in the final.

== Seeds ==
1. (Australia) Jordan Kerr / (France) Fabrice Martin (final)
2. (New Zealand) Marcus Daniell / (New Zealand) Artem Sitak (champions)
3. (Belgium) Ruben Bemelmans / (Japan) Hiroki Moriya (quarterfinals)
4. (Tunisia) Malek Jaziri / (Australia) Luke Saville (quarterfinals)

== Draw ==
Key

- Q = Qualifier
- WC = Wild card
- LL = Lucky loser
- Alt = Alternate
- ITF = ITF entry
- PR = Protected ranking
- SR = Special ranking
- SE = Special exempt
- JE = Junior exempt
- JR = Junior Accelerator Programme entrant
- CO = College Accelerator Programme entrant
- NG = Next Gen Accelerator Program entrant
- w/o = Walkover
- r = Retired
- d = Defaulted

First round
1	(Australia) J Kerr (France) F Martin	6	6
(United States) Amrit Narasimhan (United States) M Shabaz	3	1
(Monaco) B Balleret (France) V Millot	6	6
(United Kingdom) Richard Gabb (Canada) Pavel Krainik	0	4
3	(Belgium) R Bemelmans (Japan) H Moriya	6	6
(United States) J Jung (Canada) Tommy Mylnikov	3	1
(Canada) É Chvojka (Slovakia) L Lacko	4	6	[11]
(Canada) P Bester (Canada) B Schnur	6	4	[13]
(Ecuador) G Escobar (Venezuela) LD Martínez	4	6	[6]
(United States) C Buchanan (Republic of Ireland) J McGee	6	4	[10]
(United States) E Quigley (United States) John Thompson	1	3
4	(Tunisia) M Jaziri (Australia) L Saville	6	6
(Canada) S Diez (United States) A El Mihdawy	6	6
WC	(Canada) Laurent Galarneau (Canada) Laurent Mailloux	4	2
(Canada) Isade Juneau (Canada) Kéziel Juneau	2	0
2	(New Zealand) M Daniell (New Zealand) A Sitak	6	6

Quarterfinals
1	(Australia) J Kerr (France) F Martin	6	7^{7}
(Monaco) B Balleret (France) V Millot	1	6^{3}
3	(Belgium) R Bemelmans (Japan) H Moriya	3	6	[8]
(Canada) P Bester (Canada) B Schnur	6	3	[10]
(United States) C Buchanan (Republic of Ireland) J McGee	6	7^{7}
4	(Tunisia) M Jaziri (Australia) L Saville	4	6^{5}
(Canada) S Diez (United States) A El Mihdawy	2	1
2	(New Zealand) M Daniell (New Zealand) A Sitak	6	6

Semifinals
1	(Australia) J Kerr (France) F Martin	3	6	[13]
(Canada) P Bester (Canada) B Schnur	6	3	[11]
(United States) C Buchanan (Republic of Ireland) J McGee	1	4
2	(New Zealand) M Daniell (New Zealand) A Sitak	6	6

Final
1	(Australia) J Kerr (France) F Martin	6^{5}	7	[5]
2	(New Zealand) M Daniell (New Zealand) A Sitak	7^{7}	5	[10]
