= 2011 Challenger Banque Nationale de Granby =

Tennis tournament

- Date: July 11 – July 17
- Edition: 18th (men); 1st (women)
- Category: ATP Challenger Tour; ITF Women's Circuit
- Prize money: US$50,000+H (men); US$25,000 (women)
- Surface: Hard – outdoors
- Location: Granby, Quebec, Canada
- Venue: Club de tennis des Loisirs de Granby

Champions

Men's singles
- (France) Édouard Roger-Vasselin

Women's singles
- (Canada) Stéphanie Dubois

Men's doubles
- (Slovakia) Karol Beck / (France) Édouard Roger-Vasselin

Women's doubles
- (Canada) Sharon Fichman / (China) Sun Shengnan
- Challenger de Granby

The 2011 Challenger Banque Nationale de Granby was a professional tennis tournament played on outdoor hard courts. It was the 18th edition, for men, and 1st edition, for women, of the tournament and part of the 2011 ATP Challenger Tour and the 2011 ITF Women's Circuit, offering totals of $50,000, for men, and $25,000, for women, in prize money. It took place in Granby, Quebec, Canada between July 11 and July 17, 2011.

== Men's singles main-draw entrants ==
=== Seeds ===
Country	Player	Rank^{1}	Seed
ISR	Dudi Sela	82	1
GER	Matthias Bachinger	92	2
FRA	Nicolas Mahut	95	3
SVK	Karol Beck	102	4
JPN	Tatsuma Ito	111	5
FRA	Édouard Roger-Vasselin	136	6
FRA	Arnaud Clément	169	7
CAN	Vasek Pospisil	191	8

- ^{1} Rankings are as of July 4, 2011

=== Other entrants ===
The following players received wildcards into the singles main draw:

- (Canada) Steven Diez
- (Canada) Kamil Pajkowski
- (Canada) Milan Pokrajac
- (Canada) Zachary White

The following player received entry as an alternate:

- (France) Antoine Benneteau

The following players received entry from the qualifying draw:

- (United States) Sekou Bangoura
- (Canada) Jean-François Bérard
- (Canada) Filip Peliwo
- (Canada) Yoann Ré

== Champions ==
=== Men's singles ===
(France) Édouard Roger-Vasselin def. (Germany) Matthias Bachinger, 7–6^{(11–9)}, 4–6, 6–1

=== Women's singles ===
(Canada) Stéphanie Dubois def. (Hong Kong) Zhang Ling, 6–2, 2–6, 6–1

=== Men's doubles ===
(Slovakia) Karol Beck / (France) Édouard Roger-Vasselin def. (Germany) Matthias Bachinger / (Germany) Frank Moser, 6–1, 6–3

=== Women's doubles ===
(Canada) Sharon Fichman / (China) Sun Shengnan def. (Belarus) Viktoryia Kisialeva / (Brazil) Nathalia Rossi, 6–4, 6–2
