= 2016 Challenger Banque Nationale de Granby – Men's singles =

Men's singles
- 2016 Challenger Banque Nationale de Granby

Final
- Champion: (United States) Frances Tiafoe
- Runner-up: (El Salvador) Marcelo Arévalo
- Score: 6–1, 6–1

Events
Singles	men	women
Doubles	men	women
- Challenger de Granby

Vincent Millot was the defending champion, but lost in the second round to James McGee.

Frances Tiafoe won the title, defeating Marcelo Arévalo 6–1, 6–1 in the final.

== Seeds ==
1. (France) Stéphane Robert (first round)
2. (France) Quentin Halys (first round)
3. (India) Saketh Myneni (first round)
4. (United States) Frances Tiafoe (champion)
5. (Colombia) Alejandro González (first round)
6. (Colombia) Eduardo Struvay (first round, retired)
7. (France) Vincent Millot (second round)
8. (France) Grégoire Barrère (second round)

== Draw ==
Key

- Q = Qualifier
- WC = Wild card
- LL = Lucky loser
- Alt = Alternate
- ITF = ITF entry
- PR = Protected ranking
- SR = Special ranking
- SE = Special exempt
- JE = Junior exempt
- JR = Junior Accelerator Programme entrant
- CO = College Accelerator Programme entrant
- NG = Next Gen Accelerator Program entrant
- w/o = Walkover
- r = Retired
- d = Defaulted

=== Finals ===
Semifinals
(El Salvador) Marcelo Arévalo	6	2	6
(United States) Sekou Bangoura	1	6	1
4	(United States) Frances Tiafoe	6	7^{7}
Q	(Japan) Yasutaka Uchiyama	3	6^{3}

Final
(El Salvador) Marcelo Arévalo	1	1
4	(United States) Frances Tiafoe	6	6

=== Top half ===
First round
1	(France) S Robert	1	3
(El Salvador) M Arévalo	6	6
Q	(Ecuador) E Gómez	4	4
(Japan) H Moriya	6	6
WC	(Canada) B Schnur	2	6	2
(United States) M Krueger	6	1	6
(Brazil) G Clezar	4	6	2
6	(Colombia) E Struvay	6	0	0^{r}
3	(India) S Myneni	1	3
(Kazakhstan) A Golubev	6	6
(United States) S Bangoura	4	6	6
WC	(Canada) F Auger-Aliassime	6	4	3
WC	(Canada) D Shapovalov	7^{7}	7^{7}
(Australia) L Saville	6^{2}	6^{4}
(United Kingdom) B Klein	3	3
8	(France) G Barrère	6	6

Second round
(El Salvador) M Arévalo	7^{7}	6
(Japan) H Moriya	6^{4}	4
(United States) M Krueger	6	7^{7}
(Brazil) G Clezar	4	6^{3}
(Kazakhstan) A Golubev	1^{r}
(United States) S Bangoura	5
WC	(Canada) D Shapovalov	6	6
8	(France) G Barrère	4	1

Quarterfinals
(El Salvador) M Arévalo	6	6
(United States) M Krueger	1	4
(United States) S Bangoura	6	6
WC	(Canada) D Shapovalov	4	3

Semifinals
(El Salvador) M Arévalo	6	2	6
(United States) S Bangoura	1	6	1

=== Bottom half ===
First round
5	(Colombia) A González	6^{6}	2
(Australia) A Whittington	7^{8}	6
(Canada) P Polansky	6	6
(France) T Lamasine	4	2
(United Kingdom) L Broady	4	6^{5}
(United Kingdom) J Ward	6	7^{7}
Q	(United Kingdom) E Corrie	3	4
4	(United States) F Tiafoe	6	6
7	(France) V Millot	6	6
(Australia) B Mitchell	3	2
Q	(Republic of Ireland) J McGee	6	6
(Israel) A Weintraub	3	3
Q	(Japan) Y Uchiyama	4	6	6
(Canada) F Dancevic	6	3	3
WC	(Canada) P Bester	6	7^{7}
2	(France) Q Halys	2	6^{1}

Second round
(Australia) A Whittington	6^{5}	6	6
(Canada) P Polansky	7^{7}	2	4
(United Kingdom) J Ward	6	3	5
4	(United States) F Tiafoe	3	6	7
7	(France) V Millot	6	1	4
Q	(Republic of Ireland) J McGee	3	6	6
Q	(Japan) Y Uchiyama	6	7
WC	(Canada) P Bester	4	5

Quarterfinals
(Australia) A Whittington	0	6^{5}
4	(United States) F Tiafoe	6	7^{7}
Q	(Republic of Ireland) J McGee	6^{4}	1
Q	(Japan) Y Uchiyama	7^{7}	6

Semifinals
4	(United States) F Tiafoe	6	7^{7}
Q	(Japan) Y Uchiyama	3	6^{3}
