= 2015 Challenger Banque Nationale de Granby – Women's singles =

Women's singles
- 2015 Challenger Banque Nationale de Granby

Final
- Champion: (United Kingdom) Johanna Konta
- Runner-up: (France) Stéphanie Foretz
- Score: 6–2, 6–4

Events
Singles	men	women
Doubles	men	women
- Challenger de Granby

Miharu Imanishi was the defending champion, but decided not to participate this year.

Johanna Konta won the title, defeating Stéphanie Foretz 6–2, 6–4 in the final.

== Seeds ==
1. (United Kingdom) Johanna Konta (champion)
2. (Japan) Naomi Osaka (first round)
3. (France) Stéphanie Foretz (final)
4. (France) Julie Coin (quarterfinals)
5. (Mexico) Marcela Zacarías (first round)
6. (Australia) Olivia Rogowska (second round)
7. (United Kingdom) Naomi Broady (quarterfinals)
8. (France) Amandine Hesse (second round)

== Draw ==
Key

- Q = Qualifier
- WC = Wild card
- LL = Lucky loser
- Alt = Alternate
- ITF = ITF entry
- PR = Protected ranking
- SR = Special ranking
- SE = Special exempt
- JE = Junior exempt
- JR = Junior Accelerator Programme entrant
- CO = College Accelerator Programme entrant
- NG = Next Gen Accelerator Program entrant
- w/o = Walkover
- r = Retired
- d = Defaulted

=== Finals ===
Semifinals
1	(United Kingdom) Johanna Konta	6	7
(Mexico) Victoria Rodríguez	0	5
3	(France) Stéphanie Foretz	6	7
(Australia) Jessica Moore	2	5

Final
1	(United Kingdom) Johanna Konta	6	6
3	(France) Stéphanie Foretz	2	4

=== Top half ===
First round
1	(United Kingdom) J Konta	7	6
(Czech Republic) B Štefková	5	1
(Chile) A Koch	6	7^{8}
(United States) A Mueller	2	6^{6}
(Canada) H El Tabakh	7	6
(Chile) A Guarachi	5	4
(United States) D Lao	1	3
7	(United Kingdom) N Broady	6	6
4	(France) J Coin	6	6
(United Kingdom) E Webley-Smith	3	1
(Chinese Taipei) C-y Hsu	6	6
(Paraguay) AP Neffa de los Ríos	0	3
(Mexico) V Rodríguez	6	6
Q	(Canada) M Patrascu	2	4
(United States) L Albanese	4	4
6	(Australia) O Rogowska	6	6

Second round
1	(United Kingdom) J Konta	7	6
(Chile) A Koch	5	0
(Canada) H El Tabakh	3	6	5
7	(United Kingdom) N Broady	6	3	7
4	(France) J Coin	7	4	6
(Chinese Taipei) C-y Hsu	5	6	4
(Mexico) V Rodríguez	7^{7}	6
6	(Australia) O Rogowska	6^{2}	1

Quarterfinals
1	(United Kingdom) J Konta	6	6
7	(United Kingdom) N Broady	3	3
4	(France) J Coin	6	1	1
(Mexico) V Rodríguez	3	6	6

Semifinals
1	(United Kingdom) J Konta	6	7
(Mexico) V Rodríguez	0	5

=== Bottom half ===
First round
8	(France) A Hesse	6	6
Q	(Canada) K Sebov	3	3
WC	(Canada) A Broomfield	2	2
WC	(Canada) C Robillard-Millette	6	6
Q	(Japan) A Inoue	7	6
(Canada) F Abanda	5	3
(Japan) M Inoue	1	6^{5}
3	(France) S Foretz	6	7^{7}
5	(Mexico) M Zacarías	4	4
(Canada) C Zhao	6	6
(Australia) S Sanders	6^{3}	6	3
(Australia) J Moore	7^{7}	3	6
WC	(Canada) E Routliffe	3	1
Q	(United States) E Halbauer	6	6
WC	(United Kingdom) L Robson	7^{7}	6^{5}	6
2	(Japan) N Osaka	6^{5}	7^{7}	3

Second round
8	(France) A Hesse	6	4	6^{5}
WC	(Canada) C Robillard-Millette	0	6	7^{7}
Q	(Japan) A Inoue	1	4
3	(France) S Foretz	6	6
(Canada) C Zhao	6	1	2
(Australia) J Moore	1	6	6
Q	(United States) E Halbauer	6	4	6
WC	(United Kingdom) L Robson	2	6	2

Quarterfinals
WC	(Canada) C Robillard-Millette	4	3
3	(France) S Foretz	6	6
(Australia) J Moore	6^{5}	6	7^{7}
Q	(United States) E Halbauer	7^{7}	4	6^{5}

Semifinals
3	(France) S Foretz	6	7
(Australia) J Moore	2	5
