= 2011 Challenger Banque Nationale de Granby – Men's singles =

Men's singles
- 2011 Challenger Banque Nationale de Granby

Final
- Champion: (France) Édouard Roger-Vasselin
- Runner-up: (Germany) Matthias Bachinger
- Score: 7–6^{(11–9)}, 4–6, 6–1

Events
Singles	men	women
Doubles	men	women
- Challenger de Granby

Tobias Kamke was the defending champion but decided not to participate.

Édouard Roger-Vasselin won the title, defeating Matthias Bachinger 7–6^{(11–9)}, 4–6, 6–1 in the final.

== Seeds ==
1. (Israel) Dudi Sela (quarterfinals)
2. (Germany) Matthias Bachinger (final)
3. (France) Nicolas Mahut (quarterfinals)
4. (Slovakia) Karol Beck (semifinals)
5. (Japan) Tatsuma Ito (quarterfinals)
6. (France) Édouard Roger-Vasselin (champion)
7. (France) Arnaud Clément (semifinals)
8. (Canada) Vasek Pospisil (quarterfinals, retired)

== Draw ==
Key

- Q = Qualifier
- WC = Wild card
- LL = Lucky loser
- Alt = Alternate
- ITF = ITF entry
- PR = Protected ranking
- SR = Special ranking
- SE = Special exempt
- JE = Junior exempt
- JR = Junior Accelerator Programme entrant
- CO = College Accelerator Programme entrant
- NG = Next Gen Accelerator Program entrant
- w/o = Walkover
- r = Retired
- d = Defaulted

=== Finals ===
Semifinals
6	(France) Édouard Roger-Vasselin	1	6	6
7	(France) Arnaud Clément	6	3	3
4	(Slovakia) Karol Beck	1	6	4
2	(Germany) Matthias Bachinger	6	3	6

Final
6	(France) Édouard Roger-Vasselin	7^{11}	4	6
2	(Germany) Matthias Bachinger	6^{9}	6	1

=== Top half ===
First round
1	(Israel) D Sela	6	6
(Australia) Mark Verryth	4	3
(United States) R Ram	6	6
Q	(Canada) Jean-François Bérard	2	1
(United States) J Levine	6	6
(United States) James Ludlow	4	4
(United Kingdom) D Cox	2	2
6	(France) É Roger-Vasselin	6	6
3	(France) N Mahut	6	6
WC	(Canada) Milan Pokrajac	1	1
(United Kingdom) J Milton	6	6
(Germany) S Stadler	2	3
(United States) A El Mihdawy	4	6	6
Q	(United States) S Bangoura	6	3	2
(France) M Rodrigues	3	3
7	(France) A Clément	6	6

Second round
1	(Israel) D Sela	6	6
(United States) R Ram	4	2
(United States) J Levine	6^{2}	3
6	(France) É Roger-Vasselin	7^{7}	6
3	(France) N Mahut	6	6
(United Kingdom) J Milton	4	2
(United States) A El Mihdawy	3	4
7	(France) A Clément	6	6

Quarterfinals
1	(Israel) D Sela	6^{5}	2
6	(France) É Roger-Vasselin	7^{7}	6
3	(France) N Mahut	1	5
7	(France) A Clément	6	7

Semifinals
6	(France) É Roger-Vasselin	1	6	6
7	(France) A Clément	6	3	3

=== Bottom half ===
First round
8	(Canada) V Pospisil	6	6
WC	(Canada) Zachary White	1	1
WC	(Canada) S Diez	7^{10}	6
WC	(Canada) Kamil Pajkowski	6^{8}	2
LL	(United States) Peter Aarts	3	3
(France) Clément Reix	6	6
(China) G Maoxin	3	0
4	(Slovakia) K Beck	6	6
5	(Japan) T Ito	6	6
(Australia) G Jones	2	4
Q	(Canada) F Peliwo	1	2
(Canada) E Chvojka	6	6
Q	(Canada) Yoann Ré	1	3
Alt	(France) Antoine Benneteau	6	6
(United Kingdom) R Bloomfield	3	4
2	(Germany) M Bachinger	6	6

Second round
8	(Canada) V Pospisil	7	6
WC	(Canada) S Diez	5	1
(France) Clément Reix	2	6	3
4	(Slovakia) K Beck	6	2	6
5	(Japan) T Ito	6	6
(Canada) E Chvojka	1	1
Alt	(France) A Benneteau	6^{2}	4
2	(Germany) M Bachinger	7^{7}	6

Quarterfinals
8	(Canada) V Pospisil	5^{r}
4	(Slovakia) K Beck	6
5	(Japan) T Ito	6^{4}	6	5
2	(Germany) M Bachinger	7^{7}	3	7

Semifinals
4	(Slovakia) K Beck	1	6	4
2	(Germany) M Bachinger	6	3	6
