= Championnats de Granby =

Tennis tournament in Quebec, Canada

Les Championnats Banque Nationale de Granby
- 2026 Championnats Banque Nationale de Granby

Tournament information
- Founded: 1993; 33 years ago
- Location: Granby, Quebec; Canada
- Venue: Club de tennis des Loisirs de Granby
- Surface: Hard – outdoors
- Website: Official website

Current champions (2022)
- Men's singles: (Canada) Gabriel Diallo
- Women's singles: Daria Kasatkina
- Men's doubles: (United Kingdom) Julian Cash (United Kingdom) Henry Patten
- Women's doubles: (United Kingdom) Alicia Barnett (United Kingdom) Olivia Nicholls
ATP Tour
- Category: ATP Challenger 75 (2024-), Challenger 100 (2023)
- Draw: 32S (24Q) / 16D (0Q)
- Prize money: US$100,000
WTA Tour
- Category: WTA 250 (2022), ITF Women's WTT (2011-2019, 2023-present)
- Draw: 32S (24Q) / 16D (0Q)
- Prize money: US$251,750

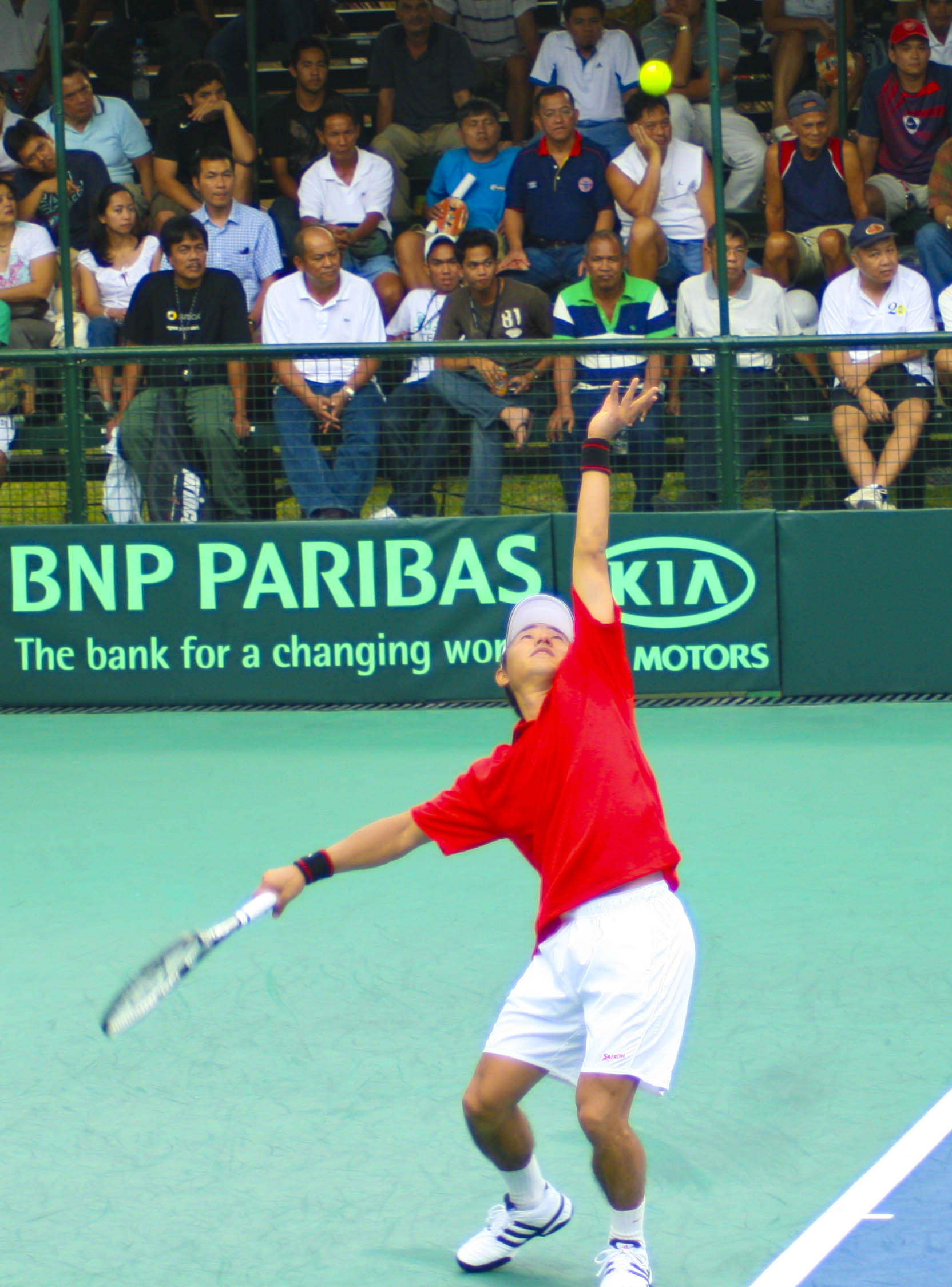
Japanese player Takao Suzuki reached and won three singles finals in 1998, 2000 and 2007, and one doubles final in 1998 with Gouichi Motomura.

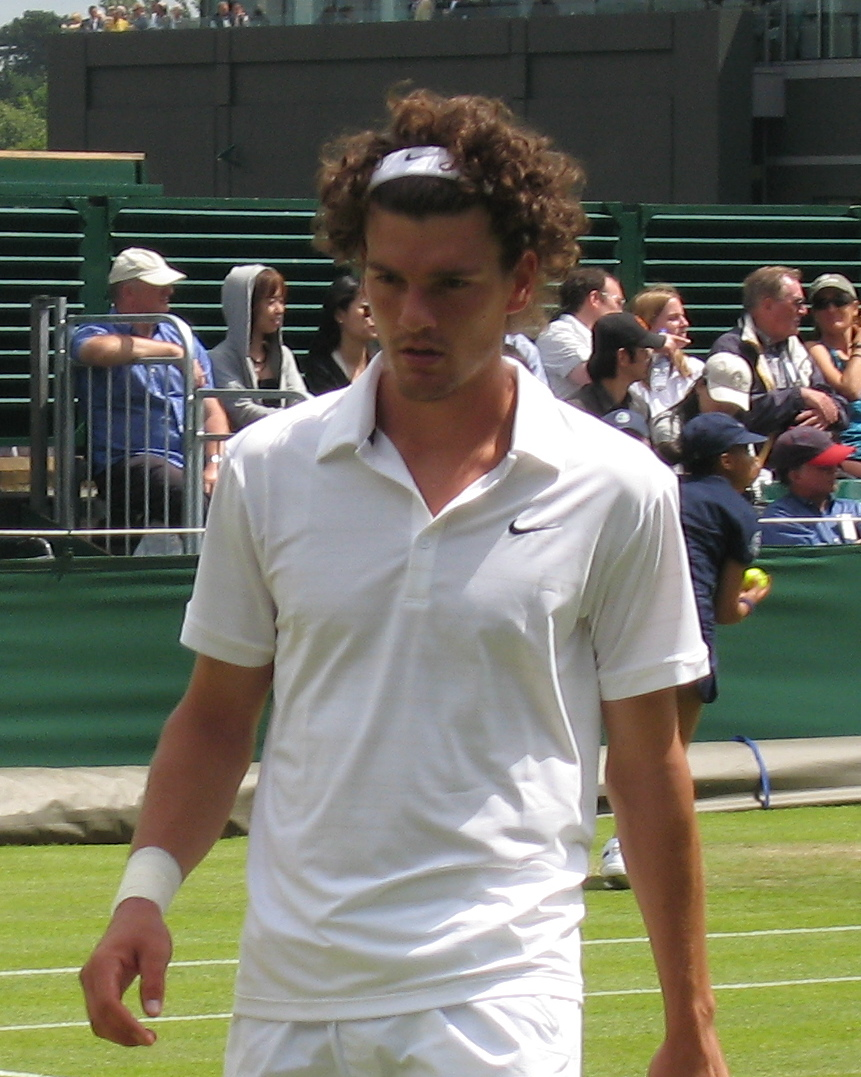
Canada's Frank Dancevic won the title three times in 2003, 2006 and 2013, and the doubles once in 2004 with Brian Baker.

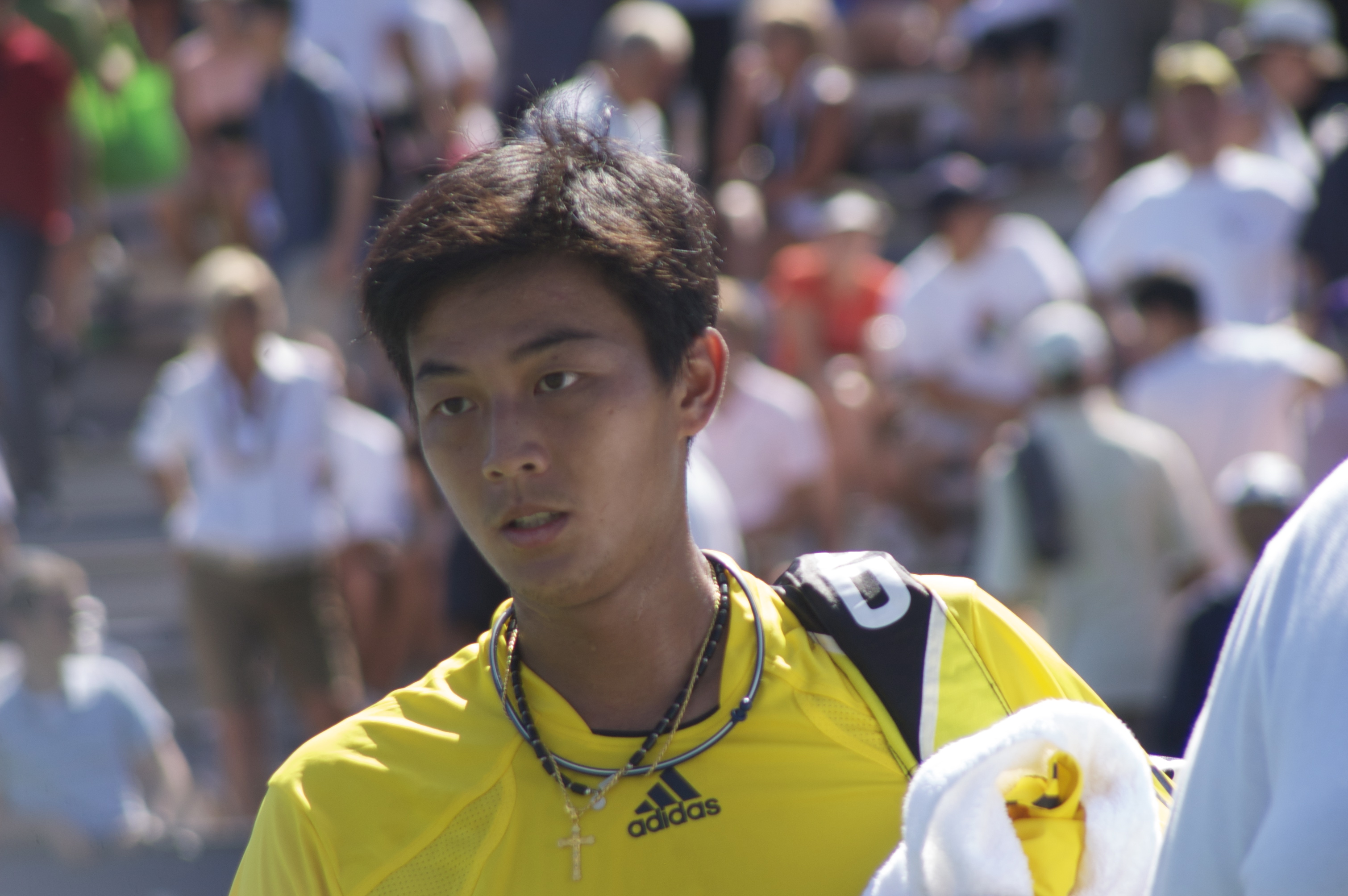
Competing for Chinese Taipei, Lu Yen-hsun won two doubles finals in 2003 and 2005, and finished runner-up in doubles in 2006, and singles in 2007.

Les Championnats Banque Nationale de Granby (formerly Challenger de Granby) is a professional tennis tournament played on outdoor hardcourts. It is currently part of the ATP Challenger Tour and the ITF Women's World Tennis Tour. It has been held annually in Granby, Quebec, since 1993 for men, and 2011 for women. In 2025 the tournament celebrated its 30th anniversary.

== Past finals ==
=== Men's singles ===
| Location | Year | Champion | Runner-up | Score |
Granby
| Granby | 2026 | (Australia) Aleksandar Vukic | (France) Arthur Géa | 6–4, 1–6, 6–1 |
| Granby | 2025 | (Denmark) August Holmgren | (Canada) Liam Draxl | 6–3, 6–3 |
| Granby | 2024 | (China) Bu Yunchaokete | (France) Térence Atmane | 6–3, 6–7^{(7–9)}, 6–4 |
| Granby | 2023 | (Canada) Alexis Galarneau | (Australia) Philip Sekulic | 6–4, 3–6, 6–3 |
| Granby | 2022 | (Canada) Gabriel Diallo | (China) Shang Juncheng | 7–5, 7–6^{(7–5)} |
| Granby | 2021 | Tournament cancelled due to the COVID-19 pandemic | | |
| Granby | 2020 | Tournament cancelled due to the COVID-19 pandemic | | |
| Granby | 2019 | (United States) Ernesto Escobedo | (Japan) Yasutaka Uchiyama | 7–6^{(7–5)}, 6–4 |
| Granby | 2018 | (Canada) Peter Polansky | (France) Ugo Humbert | 6–4, 1–6, 6–2 |
| Granby | 2017 | (Slovenia) Blaž Kavčič | (Canada) Peter Polansky | 6–3, 2–6, 7–5 |
| Granby | 2016 | (United States) Frances Tiafoe | (El Salvador) Marcelo Arévalo | 6–1, 6–1 |
| Granby | 2015 | (France) Vincent Millot | (Canada) Philip Bester | 6–4, 6–4 |
| Granby | 2014 | (Japan) Hiroki Moriya | (France) Fabrice Martin | 7–5, 6–7^{(4–7)}, 6–3 |
| Granby | 2013 | (Canada) Frank Dancevic (3) | (Slovakia) Lukáš Lacko | 6–4, 6–7^{(4–7)}, 6–3 |
| Granby | 2012 | (Canada) Vasek Pospisil | (Netherlands) Igor Sijsling | 7–6^{(7–2)}, 6–4 |
| Granby | 2011 | (France) Édouard Roger-Vasselin | (Germany) Matthias Bachinger | 7–6^{(11–9)}, 4–6, 6–1 |
| Granby | 2010 | (Germany) Tobias Kamke | (Canada) Milos Raonic | 6–3, 7–6^{(7–4)} |
| Granby | 2009 | (Belgium) Xavier Malisse | (South Africa) Kevin Anderson | 6–4, 6–4 |
| Granby | 2008 | (United Kingdom) Alex Bogdanovic | (Thailand) Danai Udomchoke | 7–6^{(16–14)}, 3–6, 7–6^{(8–6)} |
| Granby | 2007 | (Japan) Takao Suzuki (3) | (Chinese Taipei) Lu Yen-hsun | 6–4, 6–4 |
| Granby | 2006 | (Canada) Frank Dancevic (2) | (Germany) Tobias Clemens | 6–7^{(2–7)}, 7–6^{(8–6)}, 6–3 |
| Granby | 2005 | (Thailand) Danai Udomchoke | (France) Grégory Carraz | 7–6^{(8–6)}, 2–6, 7–6^{(7–2)} |
| Granby | 2004 | (United States) Michael Russell | (Italy) Davide Sanguinetti | 6–3, 6–2 |
| Granby | 2003 | (Canada) Frank Dancevic | (United States) Eric Taino | 7–6^{(12–10)}, 6–1 |
| Granby | 2002 | (Australia) Peter Luczak | (United States) Alex Bogomolov, Jr. | 6–3, 7–6^{(8–6)} |
| Granby | 2001 | (Germany) Axel Pretzsch | (United States) Jeff Morrison | 6–7^{(5–7)}, 6–3, 6–4 |
| Granby | 2000 | (Japan) Takao Suzuki (2) | (United States) Cecil Mamiit | 6–4, 6–3 |
| Granby | 1999 | (Czech Republic) Petr Kralert | (The Bahamas) Mark Knowles | 6–4, 6–7, 7–6 |
| Granby | 1998 | (Japan) Takao Suzuki | (United States) David Caldwell | 7–6, 6–3 |
| Granby | 1997 | (Zimbabwe) Wayne Black | (Italy) Cristiano Caratti | 6–1, 6–2 |
| Granby | 1996 | not held | | |
| Granby | 1995 | (United States) Robbie Weiss | (Armenia) Sargis Sargsian | 6–2, 6–2 |
| Montebello | 1994 | (Canada) Sébastien Lareau | (Germany) Patrick Baur | 7–6, 6–1 |
| Montebello | 1993 | (Italy) Cristiano Caratti | (United States) Steve Bryan | 4–6, 7–5, 6–3 |

=== Women's singles ===
| Year | Champion | Runner-up | Score |
↓ ITF tournament ↓
| 2026 | (Canada) Kayla Cross | (Japan) Sara Saito | 7–5, 6–1 |
| 2025 | (Australia) Talia Gibson | (United States) Fiona Crawley | 6–3, 6–4 |
| 2024 | (United States) Maria Mateas | (Canada) Kayla Cross | 6–3, 7–6^{(7–3)} |
| 2023 | (United States) Kayla Day | (Canada) Katherine Sebov | 6–4, 2–6, 7–5 |
↓ WTA 250 tournament ↓
| 2022 | Daria Kasatkina | (Australia) Daria Saville | 6–4, 6–4 |
↓ ITF tournament ↓
| 2021 | tournament cancelled due to the COVID-19 pandemic | | |
| 2020 | tournament cancelled due to the COVID-19 pandemic | | |
| 2019 | (Australia) Lizette Cabrera | (Canada) Leylah Fernandez | 6–1, 6–4 |
| 2018 | (Israel) Julia Glushko | (Australia) Arina Rodionova | 6–4, 6–3 |
| 2017 | (Italy) Cristiana Ferrando | (Canada) Katherine Sebov | 6–2, 6–3 |
| 2016 | (United States) Jennifer Brady | (Belarus) Olga Govortsova | 7–5, 6–2 |
| 2015 | (United Kingdom) Johanna Konta | (France) Stéphanie Foretz | 6–2, 6–4 |
| 2014 | (Japan) Miharu Imanishi | (France) Stéphanie Foretz | 6–4, 6–4 |
| 2013 | (Japan) Risa Ozaki | (United Kingdom) Samantha Murray | 0–6, 7–5, 6–2 |
| 2012 | (Canada) Eugenie Bouchard | (Canada) Stéphanie Dubois | 6–2, 5–2 retired |
| 2011 | (Canada) Stéphanie Dubois | (Hong Kong) Zhang Ling | 6–2, 2–6, 6–1 |

=== Men's doubles ===
| Location | Year | Champions | Runners-up | Score |
Granby
| Granby | 2026 | (New Zealand) Finn Reynolds (New Zealand) James Watt | (France) Guillaume Dalmasso (United States) Matt Kuhar | 6–3, 6–4 |
| Granby | 2025 | (New Zealand) Finn Reynolds (New Zealand) James Watt | (Australia) Kody Pearson (Japan) Yuta Shimizu | 6–3, 6–4 |
| Granby | 2024 | (Ecuador) Andrés Andrade (United States) Mac Kiger | (Canada) Justin Boulais (Canada) Joshua Lapadat | 3–6, 6–3, [10–2] |
| Granby | 2023 | (United States) Christian Harrison (Latvia) Miķelis Lībietis | (Australia) Tristan Schoolkate (Australia) Adam Walton | 6–4, 6–3 |
| Granby | 2022 | (United Kingdom) Julian Cash (United Kingdom) Henry Patten | (France) Jonathan Eysseric (New Zealand) Artem Sitak | 6–3, 6–2 |
| Granby | 2021 | tournament cancelled due to the COVID-19 pandemic | | |
| Granby | 2020 | tournament cancelled due to the COVID-19 pandemic | | |
| Granby | 2019 | (Sweden) André Göransson (Netherlands) Sem Verbeek | (China) Li Zhe (Monaco) Hugo Nys | 6–2, 6–4 |
| Granby | 2018 | (United States) Alex Lawson (China) Li Zhe | (United States) JC Aragone (United Kingdom) Liam Broady | 7–6^{(7–2)}, 6–3 |
| Granby | 2017 | (United Kingdom) Joe Salisbury (United States) Jackson Withrow | (Uruguay) Marcel Felder (Japan) Go Soeda | 4–6, 6–3, [10–6] |
| Granby | 2016 | (Brazil) Guilherme Clezar (Colombia) Alejandro González | (India) Saketh Myneni (India) Sanam Singh | 3–6, 6–1, [12–10] |
| Granby | 2015 | (Canada) Philip Bester (3) (Canada) Peter Polansky (3) | (France) Enzo Couacaud (Australia) Luke Saville | 6–7^{(5–7)}, 7–6^{(7–2)}, [10–7] |
| Granby | 2014 | (New Zealand) Marcus Daniell (New Zealand) Artem Sitak | (Australia) Jordan Kerr (France) Fabrice Martin | 7–6^{(7–5)}, 5–7, [10–5] |
| Granby | 2013 | (Canada) Érik Chvojka (Canada) Peter Polansky (2) | (United States) Adam El Mihdawy (Croatia) Ante Pavić | 6–4, 6–3 |
| Granby | 2012 | (Canada) Philip Bester (2) (Canada) Vasek Pospisil | (Japan) Yuichi Ito (Japan) Takuto Niki | 6–1, 6–2 |
| Granby | 2011 | (Slovakia) Karol Beck (France) Édouard Roger-Vasselin | (Germany) Matthias Bachinger (Germany) Frank Moser | 6–1, 6–3 |
| Granby | 2010 | (Denmark) Frederik Nielsen (Australia) Joseph Sirianni | (Thailand) Sanchai Ratiwatana (Thailand) Sonchat Ratiwatana | 4–6, 6–4, [10–6] |
| Granby | 2009 | (United Kingdom) Colin Fleming (United Kingdom) Ken Skupski | (Israel) Amir Hadad (Israel) Harel Levy | 6–3, 7–6^{(8–6)} |
| Granby | 2008 | (Canada) Philip Bester (Canada) Peter Polansky | (United States) Alberto Francis (United States) Nicholas Monroe | 2–6, 6–1, [10–5] |
| Granby | 2007 | (Thailand) Sanchai Ratiwatana (Thailand) Sonchat Ratiwatana | (Japan) Satoshi Iwabuchi (United States) Philip Stolt | 6–2, 7–6^{(7–4)} |
| Granby | 2006 | (Canada) Alessandro Gravina (France) Gary Lugassy | (Chinese Taipei) Lu Yen-hsun (Germany) Frank Moser | 6–2, 7–6^{(7–2)} |
| Granby | 2005 | (Sweden) Johan Landsberg (Chinese Taipei) Lu Yen-hsun | (Canada) Philip Bester (Canada) Frank Dancevic | 4–6, 7–6^{(7–5)}, 7–5 |
| Granby | 2004 | (United States) Brian Baker (Canada) Frank Dancevic | (Israel) Harel Levy (Italy) Davide Sanguinetti | 6–2, 7–6^{(7–5)} |
| Granby | 2003 | (Chinese Taipei) Lu Yen-hsun (Thailand) Danai Udomchoke | (Brazil) Josh Goffi (United States) Ryan Sachire | 6–7^{(4–7)}, 6–4, 7–6^{(7–0)} |
| Granby | 2002 | (Israel) Noam Behr (United States) Michael Joyce | (France) Thomas Dupré (Canada) Simon Larose | 6–0, 6–3 |
| Granby | 2001 | (Canada) Bobby Kokavec (United States) Jeff Morrison | (United States) Brandon Hawk (United States) Robert Kendrick | 6–4, 6–4 |
| Granby | 2000 | (South Korea) Lee Hyung-taik (South Korea) Yong-il Yoon | (Canada) Frédéric Niemeyer (Canada) Jerry Turek | 7–6^{(7–3)}, 6–3 |
| Granby | 1999 | (United States) Kevin Kim (Venezuela) Jimy Szymanski | (Israel) Harel Levy (Israel) Lior Mor | 4–6, 6–1, 6–4 |
| Granby | 1998 | (Japan) Gouichi Motomura (Japan) Takao Suzuki | (Canada) Bobby Kokavec (Canada) Frédéric Niemeyer | 7–6, 6–1 |
| Granby | 1997 | (Australia) Grant Doyle (United States) Mark Merklein | (Israel) Eyal Erlich (Switzerland) Lorenzo Manta | 7–5, 6–3 |
| Granby | 1996 | not held | | |
| Granby | 1995 | (United States) Brian MacPhie (Australia) Sandon Stolle | (The Bahamas) Mark Knowles (Canada) Daniel Nestor | walkover |
| Montebello | 1994 | (Canada) Sébastien Lareau (Canada) Sébastien Leblanc | (Spain) Sergio Gómez Barrio (Canada) Brian Gyetko | 6–2, 6–3 |
| Montebello | 1993 | (United States) David DiLucia (United States) Doug Flach | (South Africa) Lan Bale (Venezuela) Maurice Ruah | 6–3, 6–2 |

=== Women's doubles ===
| Year | Champions | Runners-up | Score |
↓ ITF tournament ↓
| 2026 | (United States) Kylie Collins (United States) Olivia Lincer | (Canada) Mia Kupres (Canada) Alexandra Vagramov | 6–2, 6–2 |
| 2025 | (Canada) Alexandra Vagramov (Czech Republic) Darja Vidmanova | (Japan) Saki Imamura (Japan) Wakana Sonobe | 7–6^{(7–5)}, 6–3 |
| 2024 | (Canada) Ariana Arseneault (Canada) Mia Kupres | (Chinese Taipei) Liang En-shuo (South Korea) Park So-hyun | 6–4, 2–6, [10–6] |
| 2023 | (Mexico) Marcela Zacarías (Mexico) Renata Zarazúa | (United States) Carmen Corley (United States) Ivana Corley | 6–3, 6–3 |
↓ WTA 250 tournament ↓
| 2022 | (United Kingdom) Alicia Barnett (United Kingdom) Olivia Nicholls | (United Kingdom) Harriet Dart (Netherlands) Rosalie van der Hoek | 5–7, 6–3, [10–1] |
↓ ITF tournament ↓
| 2021 | tournament cancelled due to the COVID-19 pandemic | | |
| 2020 | tournament cancelled due to the COVID-19 pandemic | | |
| 2019 | (Japan) Haruka Kaji (Japan) Junri Namigata | (United States) Quinn Gleason (United States) Ingrid Neel | 7–6^{(7–5)}, 5–7, [10–8] |
| 2018 | (Australia) Ellen Perez (2) (Australia) Arina Rodionova | (Japan) Erika Sema (Japan) Aiko Yoshitomi | 7–5, 6–4 |
| 2017 | (Australia) Ellen Perez (Canada) Carol Zhao (2) | (Chile) Alexa Guarachi (Australia) Olivia Tjandramulia | 6–2, 6–2 |
| 2016 | (United States) Jamie Loeb (Belgium) An-Sophie Mestach | (Israel) Julia Glushko (Belarus) Olga Govortsova | 6–4, 6–4 |
| 2015 | (Australia) Jessica Moore (Australia) Storm Sanders | (United Kingdom) Laura Robson (Canada) Erin Routliffe | 7–5, 6–2 |
| 2014 | (Japan) Hiroko Kuwata (Japan) Riko Sawayanagi | (Canada) Erin Routliffe (Canada) Carol Zhao | walkover |
| 2013 | (United States) Lena Litvak (Canada) Carol Zhao | (France) Julie Coin (United Kingdom) Emily Webley-Smith | 7–5, 6–4 |
| 2012 | (Canada) Sharon Fichman (2) (Canada) Marie-Ève Pelletier | (Japan) Shuko Aoyama (Japan) Miki Miyamura | 4–6, 7–5, [10–4] |
| 2011 | (Canada) Sharon Fichman (China) Sun Shengnan | (Belarus) Viktoryia Kisialeva (Brazil) Nathália Rossi | 6–4, 6–2 |
