= 2024 Championnats Banque Nationale de Granby – Women's singles =

Women's singles
- 2024 Championnats Banque Nationale de Granby

Final
- Champion: (United States) Maria Mateas
- Runner-up: (Canada) Kayla Cross
- Score: 6–3, 7–6^{(7–3)}

Events
| Singles | men | women |
| Doubles | men | women |
| ← 2023 · | Championnats de Granby | · 2025 → |

Kayla Day was the defending champion but chose not to participate.

Maria Mateas won the title, defeating Kayla Cross in the final; 6–3, 7–6^{(7–3)}.

== Seeds ==
1. (United States) Maria Mateas (champion)
2. (United States) Victoria Hu (second round)
3. (Mexico) Ana Sofía Sánchez (first round)
4. (United States) Elvina Kalieva (first round)
5. (Chinese Taipei) Liang En-shuo (quarterfinals)
6. (United States) Jamie Loeb (first round)
7. (Japan) Kyōka Okamura (first round)
8. (Canada) Carson Branstine (quarterfinals)

== Draw ==
=== Key ===
- Q = Qualifier
- WC = Wild card
- LL = Lucky loser
- Alt = Alternate
- SE = Special exempt
- PR = Protected ranking
- ITF = ITF entry
- JE = Junior exempt
- w/o = Walkover
- r = Retired
- d = Defaulted
- SR = Special ranking

=== Finals ===
Semifinals
1 | (United States) Maria Mateas | 6 | 6
Q | (United States) Ayana Akli | 1 | 1
(Canada) Kayla Cross | 4 | 6 | 6
(Canada) Stacey Fung | 6 | 3 | 4

Final
1 | (United States) Maria Mateas | 6 | 7^{7}
(Canada) Kayla Cross | 3 | 6^{3}

=== Top half ===
First round
1 | (United States) M Mateas | 6 | 7
Q | (United States) E Cayetano | 2 | 5
(United States) K Scott | 6 | 6
LL | (United States) J Daniel | 3 | 1
Q | (Japan) N Hanatani | 3 | 1
(United States) L Ma | 6 | 6
WC | (Canada) A Arseneault | 6 | 2 | 4
5 | (Chinese Taipei) E-s Liang | 2 | 6 | 6
4 | (United States) E Kalieva | 6 | 5 | 4
Q | (United States) A Akli | 4 | 7 | 6
Q | (United States) J DeFalco | 6 | 7
(Paraguay) AP Neffa de los Ríos | 2 | 5
(United States) J Failla | 4 | 0
Q | (Canada) I Boulais | 6 | 6
(Slovakia) M Okáľová | 4 | 6 | 4
8 | (Canada) C Branstine | 6 | 4 | 6

Second round
1 | (United States) M Mateas | 6 | 5 | 6
(United States) K Scott | 2 | 7 | 2
(United States) L Ma | 6 | 4 | 5
5 | (Chinese Taipei) E-s Liang | 4 | 6 | 7
Q | (United States) A Akli | 6 | 6
Q | (United States) J DeFalco | 4 | 3
Q | (Canada) I Boulais | 2 | 3
8 | (Canada) C Branstine | 6 | 6

Quarterfinals
1 | (United States) M Mateas | 6 | 6
5 | (Chinese Taipei) E-s Liang | 2 | 2
Q | (United States) A Akli | 3 | 6 | 6
8 | (Canada) C Branstine | 6 | 2 | 3

Semifinals
1 | (United States) M Mateas | 6 | 6
Q | (United States) A Akli | 1 | 1

=== Bottom half ===
First round
7 | (Japan) K Okamura | 2 | 4
Q | (United States) A Zhu | 6 | 6
(United States) H Giavara | 3 | 1
(South Korea) S-h Park | 6 | 6
(Canada) K Cross | 6 | 6
WC | (Canada) JL Alsola | 2 | 4
WC | (Canada) M Kupres | 7 | 6
3 | (Mexico) AS Sánchez | 5 | 3
6 | (United States) J Loeb | 4 | 6 | 4
(United States) D Hewitt | 6 | 2 | 6
Q | (United States) J Robinson | 6 | 6
Q | (Canada) J Bui | 4 | 4
(Canada) S Fung | 6 | 6
WC | (Canada) B Fernandez | 2 | 0
SR | (United States) UM Arconada | 4 | 2
2 | (United States) V Hu | 6 | 6

Second round
Q | (United States) A Zhu | 3 | 3
(South Korea) S-h Park | 6 | 6
(Canada) K Cross | 4 | 6 | 6
WC | (Canada) M Kupres | 6 | 2 | 3
(United States) D Hewitt | 3 | 6 | 5
Q | (United States) J Robinson | 6 | 3 | 7
(Canada) S Fung | 7^{7} | 7
2 | (United States) V Hu | 6^{4} | 5

Quarterfinals
(South Korea) S-h Park | 6^{6} | 3
(Canada) K Cross | 7^{8} | 6
Q | (United States) J Robinson | 2 | 2
(Canada) S Fung | 6 | 6

Semifinals
(Canada) K Cross | 4 | 6 | 6
(Canada) S Fung | 6 | 3 | 4
