= 2024 Championnats Banque Nationale de Granby – Women's doubles =

Women's doubles
- 2024 Championnats Banque Nationale de Granby

Final
- Champions: (Canada) Ariana Arseneault (Canada) Mia Kupres
- Runners-up: (Chinese Taipei) Liang En-shuo (South Korea) Park So-hyun
- Score: 6–4, 2–6, [10–6]

Events
Singles	men	women
Doubles	men	women
← 2023 ·	Championnats de Granby	· 2025 →

Ariana Arseneault and Mia Kupres won the women's doubles tournament at the 2024 Championnats Banque Nationale de Granby after defeating Liang En-shuo and Park So-hyun 6–4, 2–6, [10–6] in the final.

Marcela Zacarías and Renata Zarazúa were the defending champions but chose not to participate.

== Seeds ==
1. (Chinese Taipei) Liang En-shuo / (South Korea) Park So-hyun (final)
2. (Canada) Kayla Cross / (United States) Jamie Loeb (quarterfinals)
3. (United States) Jaeda Daniel / (United States) Haley Giavara (quarterfinals)
4. (United States) Victoria Osuigwe / (United States) Whitney Osuigwe (first round, withdrew)

== Draw ==
=== Key ===
- Q = Qualifier
- WC = Wild card
- LL = Lucky loser
- Alt = Alternate
- SE = Special exempt
- PR = Protected ranking
- ITF = ITF entry
- JE = Junior exempt
- w/o = Walkover
- r = Retired
- d = Defaulted
- SR = Special ranking

First round
1	(Chinese Taipei) E-s Liang (South Korea) S-h Park	6	6
(United States) K Allen (United States) J Bernales	2	2
(United States) E Kalieva (United States) K Scott	6^{5}	6	[10]
(Canada) JL Alsola (Canada) S Nicholson	7^{7}	4	[6]
4	(United States) V Osuigwe (United States) W Osuigwe
(United States) J Failla (Mexico) AS Sánchez	w/o
(Japan) N Hanatani (United States) A Zhu	6	6^{5}	[9]
WC	(Canada) C Gagnon (Canada) A Jacobs	3	7^{7}	[11]
(Canada) B Fernandez (Slovakia) M Okáľová	6	6
(Canada) I Boulais (Canada) C Branstine	3	3
(United States) A Akli (United States) E Cayetano	4	4
3	(United States) J Daniel (United States) H Giavara	6	6
(United States) D Hewitt (United States) V Hu	3	3
(Canada) A Arseneault (Canada) M Kupres	6	6
WC	(Canada) M Ostrzygalo (Canada) J Usereau	6	4	[7]
2	(Canada) K Cross (United States) J Loeb	2	6	[10]

Quarterfinals
1	(Chinese Taipei) E-s Liang (South Korea) S-h Park	w/o
(United States) E Kalieva (United States) K Scott
(United States) J Failla (Mexico) AS Sánchez	0	5
WC	(Canada) C Gagnon (Canada) A Jacobs	6	7
(Canada) B Fernandez (Slovakia) M Okáľová	3	7	[10]
3	(United States) J Daniel (United States) H Giavara	6	5	[5]
(Canada) A Arseneault (Canada) M Kupres	6	7^{7}
2	(Canada) K Cross (United States) J Loeb	2	6^{5}

Semifinals
1	(Chinese Taipei) E-s Liang (South Korea) S-h Park	6	6
WC	(Canada) C Gagnon (Canada) A Jacobs	1	1
(Canada) B Fernandez (Slovakia) M Okáľová	4	4
(Canada) A Arseneault (Canada) M Kupres	6	6

Final
1	(Chinese Taipei) E-s Liang (South Korea) S-h Park	4	6	[6]
(Canada) A Arseneault (Canada) M Kupres	6	2	[10]
