= 2025 Tennis in the Land – Doubles =

Doubles
- 2025 Tennis in the Land

Final
- Champions: (Kazakhstan) Anna Danilina (Serbia) Aleksandra Krunić
- Runners-up: (Chinese Taipei) Chan Hao-ching (China) Jiang Xinyu
- Score: 7–6^{(7–3)}, 6–4

Details
- Draw: 16
- Seeds: 4

Events
Singles	Doubles
← 2024 ·	Tennis in the Land	· 2026 →

Anna Danilina and Aleksandra Krunić defeated Chan Hao-ching and Jiang Xinyu in the final, 7–6^{(7–3)}, 6–4 to win the doubles tennis title at the 2025 Tennis in the Land.

Cristina Bucșa and Xu Yifan were the reigning champions, but Bucșa chose to compete in Monterrey instead. Xu partnered Yang Zhaoxuan, but lost in the semifinals to Chan and Jiang.

== Seeds ==
1. (Kazakhstan) Anna Danilina / (Serbia) Aleksandra Krunić (champions)
2. (Chinese Taipei) Chan Hao-ching / (China) Jiang Xinyu (final)
3. (Norway) Ulrikke Eikeri / (Japan) Eri Hozumi (quarterfinals)
4. (Hungary) Fanny Stollár / (Chinese Taipei) Wu Fang-hsien (first round)

== Draw ==
=== Key ===
- Q = Qualifier
- WC = Wild card
- LL = Lucky loser
- Alt = Alternate
- ITF = ITF entry
- PR = Protected ranking
- SR = Special ranking
- SE = Special exempt
- JE = Junior exempt
- JR = Junior Accelerator Programme entrant
- CO = College Accelerator Programme entrant
- NG = Next Gen Accelerator Program entrant
- w/o = Walkover
- r = Retired
- d = Defaulted

=== Draw ===
First round
1	(Kazakhstan) A Danilina (Serbia) A Krunić	6	6
(China) S Zheng (China) L Zhu	2	1
(United States) C Corley (United States) I Corley	6	7^{7}
P Kudermetova (United States) A Li	2	6^{2}
4	(Hungary) F Stollár (Chinese Taipei) F-h Wu	4	4
(United Kingdom) E Appleton (Netherlands) I Haverlag	6	6
(Czech Republic) A Dețiuc (Czech Republic) M Škoch	7	7^{7}
(Japan) S Aoyama (China) Y Wang	5	6^{5}
WC	(United States) E Franz (Spain) L Tapia González	0	0
(China) Y Xu (China) Z Yang	6	6
(United Kingdom) M Lumsden (Japan) M Ninomiya	4	6	[7]
3	(Norway) U Eikeri (Japan) E Hozumi	6	1	[10]
(Netherlands) S Lamens (Netherlands) D Schuurs
WC	(United States) A Bennett (United States) A Frey	w/o
(United States) S Santamaria (China) Q Tang	4	1
2	(Chinese Taipei) H-c Chan (China) X Jiang	6	6

Quarterfinals
1	(Kazakhstan) A Danilina (Serbia) A Krunić	6	6^{2}	[10]
(United States) C Corley (United States) I Corley	4	7^{7}	[8]
(United Kingdom) E Appleton (Netherlands) I Haverlag	3	4
(Czech Republic) A Dețiuc (Czech Republic) M Škoch	6	6
(China) Y Xu (China) Z Yang	6	6
3	(Norway) U Eikeri (Japan) E Hozumi	4	3
WC	(United States) A Bennett (United States) A Frey	0	3
2	(Chinese Taipei) H-c Chan (China) X Jiang	6	6

Semifinals
1	(Kazakhstan) A Danilina (Serbia) A Krunić	6	6
(Czech Republic) A Dețiuc (Czech Republic) M Škoch	2	4
(China) Y Xu (China) Z Yang	6	6^{2}	[3]
2	(Chinese Taipei) H-c Chan (China) X Jiang	4	7^{7}	[10]

Final
1	(Kazakhstan) A Danilina (Serbia) A Krunić	7^{7}	6
2	(Chinese Taipei) H-c Chan (China) X Jiang	6^{3}	4
