= 2022 US Open Series =

In tennis, the 2022 US Open Series was the nineteenth edition of the US Open Series, which comprised a group of hard court tournaments that started on July 10, 2022, in Newport.

== Tournament schedule ==
Legend
Grand Slam Event
ATP Masters 1000 and WTA 1000
ATP Tour 500 and WTA 500
ATP Tour 250 and WTA 250

Week	Date	Men's Events	Women's Events
1	July 10 – July 17	Newport; Infosys Hall of Fame Open; 2022 Champion: (United States) Maxime Cressy	No Series Event Held This Week
2	July 23 – July 30	Atlanta; Atlanta Open; 2022 Champion: (Australia) Alex de Minaur	No Series Event Held This Week
3	July 30 – August 7	Washington D.C. Citi Open; 2022 Champion: (Australia) Nick Kyrgios	San Jose; Mubadala Silicon Valley Classic; 2022 Champion: Daria Kasatkina
4	August 13 – August 21	Cincinnati; Western & Southern Open; 2022 Champion: (Croatia) Borna Ćorić	Cincinnati; Western & Southern Open; 2022 Champion: (France) Caroline Garcia
5	August 20 – August 27	Winston-Salem; Winston-Salem Open; 2022 Champion: (France) Adrian Mannarino	Cleveland; Tennis in the Land; 2022 Champion: Liudmila Samsonova
6-7	August 29 – September 11	New York; US Open; 2022 Champion: (Russia) Daniil Medvedev	New York; US Open; 2022 Champion: (United Kingdom) Emma Raducanu

== Week 1 ==
=== Infosys Hall of Fame Open ===
Semifinals
(Australia) Jason Kubler	3	2
3	(Kazakhstan) Alexander Bublik	6	6
4	(United States) Maxime Cressy	6	4	6
2	(United States) John Isner	2	6	3

Final
3	(Kazakhstan) Alexander Bublik	6	3	6^{3}
4	(United States) Maxime Cressy	2	6	7^{7}

== Week 2 ==
=== Atlanta Open ===
Semifinals
Ilya Ivashka	7	2	2
3	(Australia) Alex de Minaur	5	6	6
4	(United States) Frances Tiafoe	1	4
6	(United States) Jenson Brooksby	6	6

Final
3	(Australia) Alex de Minaur	6	6
6	(United States) Jenson Brooksby	3	3

== Week 3 ==
=== Citi Open ===
Quarterfinals
1	Andrey Rublev	6	6
WC	(United States) J. J. Wolf	2	3
16	(United Kingdom) Dan Evans	6^{5}	6	5
(Japan) Yoshihito Nishioka	7^{7}	4	7
10	(United States) Frances Tiafoe	7^{7}	6^{12}	2
(Australia) Nick Kyrgios	6^{5}	7^{14}	6
(United States) Sebastian Korda	2	7	3
(Sweden) Mikael Ymer	6	5	6

Semifinals
1	Andrey Rublev	3	4
(Japan) Yoshihito Nishioka	6	6
(Australia) Nick Kyrgios	7^{7}	6
(Sweden) Mikael Ymer	6^{4}	3

Final
(Japan) Yoshihito Nishioka	4	3
(Australia) Nick Kyrgios	6	6

=== Mubadala Silicon Valley Classic ===
Semifinals
(United States) Shelby Rogers	6	6
9	Veronika Kudermetova	3	4
7	Daria Kasatkina	6	6
2	(Spain) Paula Badosa	2	4

Final
(United States) Shelby Rogers	7^{7}	1	2
7	Daria Kasatkina	6^{2}	6	6

== Week 4 ==
=== Western & Southern Open ===
Quarterfinals
1	Daniil Medvedev	7^{7}	6
11	(United States) Taylor Fritz	6^{1}	3
4	(Greece) Stefanos Tsitsipas	7^{7}	5	6
(United States) John Isner	6^{5}	7	3
9	(United Kingdom) Cameron Norrie	7^{7}	6^{4}	6
3	(Spain) Carlos Alcaraz	6^{4}	7^{7}	4
7	(Canada) Félix Auger-Aliassime	4	4
PR	(Croatia) Borna Ćorić	6	6

Semifinals
1	Daniil Medvedev	6^{6}	6	3
4	(Greece) Stefanos Tsitsipas	7^{8}	3	6
9	(United Kingdom) Cameron Norrie	3	4
PR	(Croatia) Borna Ćorić	6	6

Final
4	(Greece) Stefanos Tsitsipas	6^{0}	2
PR	(Croatia) Borna Ćorić	7^{7}	6

Quarterfinals
(United States) Madison Keys	6	6
(Kazakhstan) Elena Rybakina	2	4
Q	(Australia) Ajla Tomljanović	2	3
(Czech Republic) Petra Kvitová	6	6
7	(United States) Jessica Pegula	1	5
Q	(France) Caroline Garcia	6	7
6	Aryna Sabalenka	6	7^{7}
(China) Zhang Shuai	4	6^{1}

Semifinals
(United States) Madison Keys	7^{8}	4	3
(Czech Republic) Petra Kvitová	6^{6}	6	6
Q	(France) Caroline Garcia	6	4	6
6	Aryna Sabalenka	2	6	1

Final
(Czech Republic) Petra Kvitová	2	4
Q	(France) Caroline Garcia	6	6

== Week 5 ==
=== Winston-Salem Open ===
Quarterfinals
13	(United Kingdom) Jack Draper	4	4
Q	(Switzerland) Marc-Andrea Hüsler	6	6
(Serbia) Laslo Đere	6	3	7^{8}
(France) Richard Gasquet	4	6	6^{6}
(France) Adrian Mannarino	6	7^{7}
4	(United States) Maxime Cressy	4	6^{3}
10	(France) Benjamin Bonzi	6^{6}	6^{1}
2	(Netherlands) Botic van de Zandschulp	7^{8}	7^{7}

Semifinals
Q	(Switzerland) Marc-Andrea Hüsler	6^{3}	6^{5}
(Serbia) Laslo Đere	7^{7}	7^{7}
(France) Adrian Mannarino	6	6
2	(Netherlands) Botic van de Zandschulp	0	4

Final
(Serbia) Laslo Đere	6^{1}	4
(France) Adrian Mannarino	7^{7}	6

=== Tennis in the Land ===
Semifinals
(United States) Bernarda Pera	1	2
Liudmila Samsonova	6	6
7	Aliaksandra Sasnovich	6^{5}	7	6
8	(France) Alizé Cornet	7^{7}	5	3

Final
Liudmila Samsonova	6	6
7	Aliaksandra Sasnovich	1	3

== Weeks 6 & 7 ==
=== US Open ===
Quarterfinals
23	(Australia) Nick Kyrgios	5	6	5	7^{7}	4
27	Karen Khachanov	7	4	7	6^{3}	6
13	(Italy) Matteo Berrettini	1	4	6^{4}
5	(Norway) Casper Ruud	6	6	7^{7}
11	(Italy) Jannik Sinner	3	7^{9}	7^{7}	5	3
3	(Spain) Carlos Alcaraz	6	6^{7}	6^{0}	7	6
9	Andrey Rublev	6^{3}	6^{0}	4
22	(United States) Frances Tiafoe	7^{7}	7^{7}	6

Semifinals
27	Karen Khachanov	6^{5}	2	7	2
5	(Norway) Casper Ruud	7^{7}	6	5	6
3	(Spain) Carlos Alcaraz	6^{6}	6	6	6^{5}	6
22	(United States) Frances Tiafoe	7^{8}	3	1	7^{7}	3

Final
5	(Norway) Casper Ruud	4	6	6^{1}	3
3	(Spain) Carlos Alcaraz	6	2	7^{7}	6

Quarterfinals
1	(Poland) Iga Świątek	6	7^{7}
8	(United States) Jessica Pegula	3	6^{4}
22	(Czech Republic) Karolína Plíšková	1	6^{4}
6	Aryna Sabalenka	6	7^{7}
12	(United States) Coco Gauff	3	4
17	(France) Caroline Garcia	6	6
5	(Tunisia) Ons Jabeur	6	7^{7}
(Australia) Ajla Tomljanović	4	6^{4}

Semifinals
1	(Poland) Iga Świątek	3	6	6
6	Aryna Sabalenka	6	1	4
17	(France) Caroline Garcia	1	3
5	(Tunisia) Ons Jabeur	6	6

Final
1	(Poland) Iga Świątek	6	7^{7}
5	(Tunisia) Ons Jabeur	2	6^{5}
