= 2021 Tennis in the Land – Singles =

Singles
- 2021 Tennis in the Land

Final
- Champion: (Estonia) Anett Kontaveit
- Runner-up: (Romania) Irina-Camelia Begu
- Score: 7–6^{(7–5)}, 6–4

Details
- Draw: 32 (4Q / 3WC)
- Seeds: 8

Events
| Singles | Doubles |
| Tennis in the Land | · 2022 → |

This was the first edition of the tournament.

Anett Kontaveit won the title, defeating Irina-Camelia Begu in the final, 7–6^{(7–5)}, 6–4. It was Kontaveit's second WTA title (not counting Melbourne) and her first since 's-Hertogenbosch in 2017.

== Seeds ==
1. (Russia) Daria Kasatkina (quarterfinals)
2. (Estonia) Anett Kontaveit (champion)
3. (Russia) Ekaterina Alexandrova (first round)
4. (United Kingdom) Johanna Konta (withdrew)
5. (Argentina) Nadia Podoroska (second round)
6. (Poland) Magda Linette (semifinals)
7. (Spain) Sara Sorribes Tormo (semifinals)
8. (United States) Shelby Rogers (first round)
9. (China) Zhang Shuai (quarterfinals)

== Draw ==
Key

- Q = Qualifier
- WC = Wild card
- LL = Lucky loser
- Alt = Alternate
- ITF = ITF entry
- PR = Protected ranking
- SR = Special ranking
- SE = Special exempt
- JE = Junior exempt
- JR = Junior Accelerator Programme entrant
- CO = College Accelerator Programme entrant
- NG = Next Gen Accelerator Program entrant
- w/o = Walkover
- r = Retired
- d = Defaulted

=== Finals ===
Semifinals
6 | (Poland) Magda Linette | 6^{5} | 2
(Romania) Irina-Camelia Begu | 7^{7} | 6
7 | (Spain) Sara Sorribes Tormo | 4 | 4
2 | (Estonia) Anett Kontaveit | 6 | 6

Final
(Romania) Irina-Camelia Begu | 6^{5} | 4
2 | (Estonia) Anett Kontaveit | 7^{7} | 6

=== Top half ===
First round
1/WC | (Russia) D Kasatkina | 6 | 6
(Slovenia) K Juvan | 3 | 3
(Kazakhstan) A Danilina | 6^{4} | 7 | 4
(United States) C McNally | 7^{7} | 5 | 6
LL | (United Kingdom) T Moore | 4 | 5
LL | (Czech Republic) L Fruhvirtová | 6 | 7
Q | (United States) E Bektas | 6^{6} | 4
6 | (Poland) M Linette | 7^{8} | 6
3 | (Russia) E Alexandrova | 6^{3} | 3
(Romania) I-C Begu | 7^{7} | 6
WC | (United States) M Mateas | 3 | 2
(Slovenia) P Hercog | 6 | 6
(Belarus) A Sasnovich | 6 | 7
(United States) C McHale | 4 | 5
(United States) B Pera | 2 | 4
5 | (Argentina) N Podoroska | 6 | 6

Second round
1/WC | (Russia) D Kasatkina | 2 | 6 | 6
(United States) C McNally | 6 | 4 | 2
LL | (Czech Republic) L Fruhvirtová | 6^{2} | 4
6 | (Poland) M Linette | 7^{7} | 6
(Romania) I-C Begu | 7^{7} | 7
(Slovenia) P Hercog | 6^{5} | 5
(Belarus) A Sasnovich | 6^{7} | 6 | 6
5 | (Argentina) N Podoroska | 7^{9} | 4 | 4

Quarterfinals
1/WC | (Russia) D Kasatkina | 1 | 2
6 | (Poland) M Linette | 6 | 6
(Romania) I-C Begu | 6 | 6
(Belarus) A Sasnovich | 2 | 4

Semifinals
6 | (Poland) M Linette | 6^{5} | 2
(Romania) I-C Begu | 7^{7} | 6

=== Bottom half ===
First round
7 | (Spain) S Sorribes Tormo | 6 | 6
Q | (United States) A Glatch | 2 | 1
(Russia) V Zvonareva | 6 | 6
Q | (Norway) U Eikeri | 4 | 2
LL | (Japan) E Shibahara | 4 | 6 | 1
WC | (United States) B Mattek-Sands | 6 | 3 | 6
(Italy) M Trevisan | 5 | 1
9 | (China) S Zhang | 7 | 6
8 | (United States) S Rogers | 5 | 1
(Czech Republic) K Siniaková | 7 | 6
(Russia) A Blinkova | 0^{r}
LL | (Japan) N Hanatani | 1
Q | (United States) C Harrison | 1 | 2
(France) C Garcia | 6 | 6
(United States) L Davis | 6 | 0 | 0
2 | (Estonia) A Kontaveit | 1 | 6 | 6

Second round
7 | (Spain) S Sorribes Tormo | w/o
(Russia) V Zvonareva
WC | (United States) B Mattek-Sands | 4 | 6^{7}
9 | (China) S Zhang | 6 | 7^{9}
(Czech Republic) K Siniaková | 6 | 6
LL | (Japan) N Hanatani | 0 | 0
(France) C Garcia | 3 | 3
2 | (Estonia) A Kontaveit | 6 | 6

Quarterfinals
7 | (Spain) S Sorribes Tormo | 6 | 6
9 | (China) S Zhang | 3 | 1
(Czech Republic) K Siniaková | 3 | 7 | 2
2 | (Estonia) A Kontaveit | 6 | 5 | 6

Semifinals
7 | (Spain) S Sorribes Tormo | 4 | 4
2 | (Estonia) A Kontaveit | 6 | 6

== Qualifying ==
=== Seeds ===
1. (Norway) Ulrikke Eikeri (qualified)
2. (United States) Alexa Glatch (qualified)
3. (United States) Emina Bektas (qualified)
4. (United States) Catherine Harrison (qualified)
5. (Czech Republic) Linda Fruhvirtová (qualifying competition, lucky loser)
6. (United States) Sophie Chang (first round)
7. (Japan) Nagi Hanatani (qualifying competition, lucky loser)
8. (Japan) Shiho Akita (first round)

=== Qualifiers ===
1. (Norway) Ulrikke Eikeri
2. (United States) Alexa Glatch
3. (United States) Emina Bektas
4. (United States) Catherine Harrison

=== Lucky losers ===
1. (Czech Republic) Linda Fruhvirtová
2. (Japan) Nagi Hanatani
3. (United Kingdom) Tara Moore
4. (Japan) Ena Shibahara

=== Qualifying draw ===
==== First qualifier ====
First round
1 | (Norway) Ulrikke Eikeri | 6 | 6
(Romania) Andreea Mitu | 4 | 3
WC | (United States) Eleana Yu | 3 | 6 | 2
7 | (Japan) Nagi Hanatani | 6 | 2 | 6

Qualifying competition
1 | (Norway) Ulrikke Eikeri | 2 | 6 | 6
7 | (Japan) Nagi Hanatani | 6 | 4 | 1

==== Second qualifier ====
First round
2 | (United States) Alexa Glatch | 6 | 6
(Chinese Taipei) Hsu Chieh-yu | 2 | 1
(Japan) Ena Shibahara | 2 | 7^{7} | 6
6 | (United States) Sophie Chang | 6 | 6^{4} | 1

Qualifying competition
2 | (United States) Alexa Glatch | 7^{10} | 6
(Japan) Ena Shibahara | 6^{8} | 4

==== Third qualifier ====
First round
3 | (United States) Emina Bektas | 6 | 6
WC | (United States) Anna Roggenburk | 0 | 1
(Kazakhstan) Yaroslava Shvedova | 2 | 6^{3}
5 | (Czech Republic) Linda Fruhvirtová | 6 | 7^{7}

Qualifying competition
3 | (United States) Emina Bektas | 6 | 6^{6} | 6
5 | (Czech Republic) Linda Fruhvirtová | 3 | 7^{8} | 2

==== Fourth qualifier ====
First round
4 | (United States) Catherine Harrison | 6 | 7
(United States) Tori Kinard | 3 | 5
(United Kingdom) Tara Moore | 7^{8} | 6
8 | (Japan) Shiho Akita | 6^{6} | 4

Qualifying competition
4 | (United States) Catherine Harrison | 6 | 5 | 6
(United Kingdom) Tara Moore | 4 | 7 | 1
