= 2024 Championnats Banque Nationale de Granby – Men's doubles =

Men's doubles
- 2024 Championnats Banque Nationale de Granby

Final
- Champions: (Ecuador) Andrés Andrade (United States) Mac Kiger
- Runners-up: (Canada) Justin Boulais (Canada) Joshua Lapadat
- Score: 3–6, 6–3, [10–2]

Events
Singles	men	women
Doubles	men	women
← 2023 ·	Championnats de Granby	· 2025 →

Christian Harrison and Miķelis Lībietis were the defending champions but chose not to defend their title.

Andrés Andrade and Mac Kiger won the title after defeating Justin Boulais and Joshua Lapadat 3–6, 6–3, [10–2] in the final.

== Seeds ==
1. (Australia) Patrick Harper / (Australia) Calum Puttergill (first round)
2. (Mexico) Hans Hach Verdugo / (Canada) Benjamin Sigouin (first round)
3. (Australia) Kody Pearson / (Chile) Matías Soto (first round)
4. (Ecuador) Andrés Andrade / (United States) Mac Kiger (champions)

== Draw ==
Key

- Q = Qualifier
- WC = Wild card
- LL = Lucky loser
- Alt = Alternate
- ITF = ITF entry
- PR = Protected ranking
- SR = Special ranking
- SE = Special exempt
- JE = Junior exempt
- JR = Junior Accelerator Programme entrant
- CO = College Accelerator Programme entrant
- NG = Next Gen Accelerator Program entrant
- w/o = Walkover
- r = Retired
- d = Defaulted

=== Draw ===
First round
1	(Australia) P Harper (Australia) C Puttergill	2	2
(Argentina) JP Ficovich (Mexico) R Pacheco Méndez	6	6
(Switzerland) A Bellier (France) H Grenier	6^{8}	6^{4}
(France) B Bonzi (France) A Géa	7^{10}	7^{7}
4	(Ecuador) A Andrade (United States) M Kiger	6	6
(Lebanon) H Habib (United States) T Hilderbrand	4	2
WC	(Canada) L Draxl (Canada) C Harper	6	7^{7}
(United States) T Boyer (Australia) A Taylor	3	6^{1}
(Canada) K Stevenson (United States) Tennyson Whiting	7^{7}	2	[2]
(Estonia) D Glinka (Estonia) M Lajal	6^{4}	6	[10]
WC	(Canada) J Boulais (Canada) Joshua Lapadat	7	6
3	(Australia) K Pearson (Chile) M Soto	5	2
(Japan) K Uchida (Chinese Taipei) T-l Wu	4	2
(France) C Chidekh (France) L Sanchez	6	6
(Colombia) N Mejía (Colombia) A Urrea	7^{7}	6
2	(Mexico) H Hach Verdugo (Canada) B Sigouin	6^{2}	3

Quarterfinals
(Argentina) JP Ficovich (Mexico) R Pacheco Méndez	3	3
(France) B Bonzi (France) A Géa	6	6
4	(Ecuador) A Andrade (United States) M Kiger	6	4	[10]
WC	(Canada) L Draxl (Canada) C Harper	4	6	[8]
(Estonia) D Glinka (Estonia) M Lajal	6^{6}	4
WC	(Canada) J Boulais (Canada) J Lapadat	7^{8}	6
(France) C Chidekh (France) L Sanchez	7	6^{4}	[18]
(Colombia) N Mejía (Colombia) A Urrea	5	7^{7}	[20]

Semifinals
(France) B Bonzi (France) A Géa	1	1
4	(Ecuador) A Andrade (United States) M Kiger	6	6
WC	(Canada) J Boulais (Canada) J Lapadat	6	6
(Colombia) N Mejía (Colombia) A Urrea	2	2

Final
4	(Ecuador) A Andrade (United States) M Kiger	3	6	[10]
WC	(Canada) J Boulais (Canada) J Lapadat	6	3	[2]
