= 2025 Tennis in the Land – Singles =

Singles
- 2025 Tennis in the Land

Final
- Champion: (Romania) Sorana Cîrstea
- Runner-up: (United States) Ann Li
- Score: 6–2, 6–4

Details
- Draw: 32 (4Q / 3WC)
- Seeds: 8

Events
| Singles | Doubles |
| ← 2024 · | Tennis in the Land | · 2026 → |

Sorana Cîrstea defeated Ann Li in the final, 6–2, 6–4 to win 2025 Tennis in the Land. Cîrstea did not lose a set en route to her third WTA Tour singles title, and first since the 2021 İstanbul Cup. Cîrstea was the first qualifier to win the tournament.

McCartney Kessler was the reigning champion, but did not participate this year.

== Seeds ==
1. Liudmila Samsonova (quarterfinals)
2. (China) Wang Xinyu (semifinals)
3. (Australia) Maya Joint (first round)
4. Anastasia Potapova (first round)
5. (France) Loïs Boisson (first round)
6. (United Kingdom) Sonay Kartal (first round)
7. (United Kingdom) Katie Boulter (second round)
8. (United States) Hailey Baptiste (second round)

== Draw ==
=== Key ===
- Q = Qualifier
- WC = Wild card
- LL = Lucky loser
- Alt = Alternate
- ITF = ITF entry
- PR = Protected ranking
- SR = Special ranking
- SE = Special exempt
- JE = Junior exempt
- JR = Junior Accelerator Programme entrant
- CO = College Accelerator Programme entrant
- NG = Next Gen Accelerator Program entrant
- w/o = Walkover
- r = Retired
- d = Defaulted

=== Finals ===
Semifinals
Q | (Romania) Sorana Cîrstea | 6 | 7
Anastasia Zakharova | 1 | 5
(United States) Ann Li | 6 | 5 | 6
2 | (China) Wang Xinyu | 3 | 7 | 4

Final
Q | (Romania) Sorana Cîrstea | 6 | 6
(United States) Ann Li | 2 | 4

=== Top half ===
First round
1 | L Samsonova | 6 | 7^{7}
(United States) C Dolehide | 4 | 6^{2}
(United States) P Stearns | 4 | 6 | 3
Q | (China) Y Wang | 6 | 3 | 6
Q | (Romania) S Cîrstea | 6 | 6
(Japan) M Uchijima | 4 | 1
(Switzerland) J Teichmann | 6 | 1 | 6
5 | (France) L Boisson | 4 | 6 | 4
3 | (Australia) M Joint | 4 | 4
(Germany) E Lys | 6 | 6
WC | (United States) K Scott | 4 | 4
P Kudermetova | 6 | 6
(Australia) K Birrell | 7 | 4 | 3
A Zakharova | 5 | 6 | 6
(Romania) E-G Ruse | 2 | 6^{2}
8 | (United States) H Baptiste | 6 | 7^{7}

Second round
1 | L Samsonova | 6 | 6
Q | (China) Y Wang | 2 | 4
Q | (Romania) S Cîrstea | 6 | 6
(Switzerland) J Teichmann | 1 | 1
(Germany) E Lys | 6 | 6
P Kudermetova | 4 | 3
A Zakharova | 6 | 6
8 | (United States) H Baptiste | 4 | 3

Quarterfinals
1 | L Samsonova | 4 | 1
Q | (Romania) S Cîrstea | 6 | 6
(Germany) E Lys
A Zakharova | w/o

Semifinals
Q | (Romania) S Cîrstea | 6 | 7
A Zakharova | 1 | 5

=== Bottom half ===
First round
6 | (United Kingdom) S Kartal | 6 | 4 | 6^{2}
(Argentina) S Sierra | 4 | 6 | 7^{7}
PR | (China) L Zhu | 3 | 1
Q | (France) E Jacquemot | 6 | 6
(Ukraine) Y Starodubtseva | 5 | 3
(United States) A Li | 7 | 6
(United States) I Jovic | 7 | 6
4 | A Potapova | 5 | 3
7/WC | (United Kingdom) K Boulter | 6 | 6
(China) Y Yuan | 4 | 3
(Italy) L Bronzetti | 1 | 3
(Switzerland) V Golubic | 6 | 6
Q | (Australia) T Gibson | 7^{7} | 6
(Belgium) G Minnen | 6^{2} | 4
(Netherlands) S Lamens | 2 | 7^{7} | 2
2 | (China) Xin Wang | 6 | 6^{3} | 6

Second round
(Argentina) S Sierra | 5 | 6^{2}
Q | (France) E Jacquemot | 7 | 7^{7}
(United States) A Li | 6 | 2 | 6
(United States) I Jovic | 3 | 6 | 3
7/WC | (United Kingdom) K Boulter | 6^{6} | 6 | 4
(Switzerland) V Golubic | 7^{8} | 1 | 6
Q | (Australia) T Gibson | 6 | 2 | 3
2 | (China) Xin Wang | 1 | 6 | 6

Quarterfinals
Q | (France) E Jacquemot | 1 | 7 | 1
(United States) A Li | 6 | 5 | 6
(Switzerland) V Golubic | 6 | 4 | 4
2 | (China) Xin Wang | 4 | 6 | 6

Semifinals
(United States) A Li | 6 | 5 | 6
2 | (China) Xin Wang | 3 | 7 | 4

== Qualifying ==
=== Seeds ===
1. (France) Elsa Jacquemot (qualified)
2. (Switzerland) Rebeka Masarova (qualifying competition)
3. (Australia) Talia Gibson (qualified)
4. (Spain) Nuria Párrizas Díaz (qualifying competition)
5. Aliaksandra Sasnovich (first round)
6. (Romania) Sorana Cîrstea (qualified)
7. (China) Wang Yafan (qualified)
8. (United States) Anna Rogers (qualifying competition)

=== Qualifiers ===
1. (France) Elsa Jacquemot
2. (Romania) Sorana Cîrstea
3. (Australia) Talia Gibson
4. (China) Wang Yafan

=== Qualifying draw ===
==== First qualifier ====
First round
1 | (France) Elsa Jacquemot | 6 | 6
(China) Zheng Saisai | 1 | 2
(United States) Jessica Failla | 6 | 2 | 6
5 | Aliaksandra Sasnovich | 4 | 6 | 1

Qualifying competition
1 | (France) Elsa Jacquemot | 7 | 6
(United States) Jessica Failla | 5 | 2

==== Second qualifier ====
First round
2 | (Switzerland) Rebeka Masarova | 6 | 6
WC | (France) Daphnée Mpetshi Perricard | 3 | 1
WC | (United States) Anna Frey | 1 | 0
6 | (Romania) Sorana Cîrstea | 6 | 6

Qualifying competition
2 | (Switzerland) Rebeka Masarova | 2 | 2
6 | (Romania) Sorana Cîrstea | 6 | 6

==== Third qualifier ====
First round
3 | (Australia) Talia Gibson | 6 | 6
(Germany) Vivian Wolff | 2 | 1
(United Kingdom) Emily Appleton | 6 | 1 | 4
8 | (United States) Anna Rogers | 4 | 6 | 6

Qualifying competition
3 | (Australia) Talia Gibson | 7 | 6
8 | (United States) Anna Rogers | 5 | 2

==== Fourth qualifier ====
First round
4 | (Spain) Nuria Párrizas Díaz | 6 | 6
(Kazakhstan) Anna Danilina | 2 | 4
(Serbia) Aleksandra Krunić | 5 | 0
7 | (China) Wang Yafan | 7 | 6

Qualifying competition
4 | (Spain) Nuria Párrizas Díaz | 6 | 0 | 4
7 | (China) Wang Yafan | 1 | 6 | 6
