= 2023 Championnats Banque Nationale de Granby =

Professional tennis tournament held in Canada

- Date: 17–23 July 2023
- Edition: 28th
- Surface: Hard
- Location: Granby, Quebec, Canada

Champions

Men's singles
- (Canada) Alexis Galarneau

Women's singles
- (United States) Kayla Day

Men's doubles
- (United States) Christian Harrison / (Latvia) Miķelis Lībietis

Women's doubles
- (Mexico) Marcela Zacarías / (Mexico) Renata Zarazúa
← 2022 ·	Championnats de Granby	· 2024 →

The 2023 Championnats Banque Nationale de Granby was a professional tennis tournament played on outdoor hard courts. It was the 28th edition of the tournament, which was part of the 2023 ATP Challenger Tour and the 2023 ITF Women's World Tennis Tour. It took place in Granby, Quebec, Canada between 17 and 23 July 2023.

== Champions ==
=== Men's singles ===
- (Canada) Alexis Galarneau def. (Australia) Philip Sekulic 6–4, 3–6, 6–3.

=== Women's singles ===
- (United States) Kayla Day def. (Canada) Katherine Sebov, 6–4, 2–6, 7–5.

=== Men's doubles ===
- (United States) Christian Harrison / (Latvia) Miķelis Lībietis def. (Australia) Tristan Schoolkate / (Australia) Adam Walton 6–4, 6–3.

=== Women's doubles ===
- (Mexico) Marcela Zacarías / (Mexico) Renata Zarazúa def. (United States) Carmen Corley / (United States) Ivana Corley, 6–3, 6–3.

== Men's singles main-draw entrants ==
=== Seeds ===
Country	Player	Rank^{1}	Seed
AUS	Thanasi Kokkinakis	90	1
FRA	Arthur Cazaux	139	2
CHN	Shang Juncheng	155	3
CAN	Vasek Pospisil	157	4
USA	Denis Kudla	180	5
JPN	Rio Noguchi	213	6
CAN	Alexis Galarneau	215	7
FRA	Giovanni Mpetshi Perricard	218	8

- ^{1} Rankings are as of July 3, 2023.

=== Other entrants ===
The following players received wildcards into the singles main draw:

- (Canada) Justin Boulais
- (Canada) ~~Liam Draxl~~
- (Canada) ~~Brayden Schnur~~

The following players received entry into the singles main draw using protected rankings:

- (United States) Christian Harrison
- (United States) Thai-Son Kwiatkowski

The following player received entry into the singles main draw as an alternate:

- (Australia) Tristan Schoolkate

The following players received entry from the qualifying draw:

- (Jamaica) Blaise Bicknell
- (United States) Nick Chappell
- (United States) Patrick Kypson
- (Australia) Philip Sekulic
- (United States) Joshua Sheehy
- (Japan) James Trotter

The following players received entry as lucky losers:

- (Moldova) Alexander Cozbinov
- (United States) Nathan Ponwith

== Women's singles main-draw entrants ==
=== Seeds ===
Country	Player	Rank^{1}	Seed
CAN	Rebecca Marino	83	1
USA	Ashlyn Krueger	109	2
USA	Kayla Day	120	3
USA	Emina Bektas	140	4
CAN	Katherine Sebov	157	5
JPN	Himeno Sakatsume	170	6
USA	Katrina Scott	185	7
MEX	Marcela Zacarías	190	8

- ^{1} Rankings are as of July 3, 2023.

=== Other entrants ===
The following players received wildcards into the singles main draw:

- (Canada) Bianca Fernandez
- (Canada) Mia Kupres
- (Canada) Layne Sleeth
- (Canada) Annabelle Xu

The following player received entry into the singles main draw using a protected ranking:

- (United States) Jennifer Brady

The following players received entry from the qualifying draw:

- (United States) Ayana Akli
- (United States) Eryn Cayetano
- (United States) Carmen Corley
- (United States) Jaeda Daniel
- (United States) Ava Markham
- (Vietnam) Savanna Lý Nguyễn
- (Paraguay) Ana Paula Neffa de los Ríos
- (Canada) Rhea Verma
