= 2021 US Open Series =

In tennis, the 2021 US Open Series was the eighteenth edition of the US Open Series, which comprised a group of hard court tournaments that started on July 12, 2021, in Newport.

== Tournament schedule ==
Legend
Grand Slam Event
ATP Masters 1000 and WTA 1000
ATP Tour 500 and WTA 500
ATP Tour 250 and WTA 250

Week	Date	Men's Events	Women's Events
1	July 12 – July 18	Newport; Hall of Fame Open; 2021 Champion: (South Africa) Kevin Anderson	No Series Event Held This Week
2	July 24 – August 1	Atlanta; Truist Atlanta Open; 2021 Champion: (United States) John Isner	No Series Event Held This Week
3	August 2 – August 8	Washington D.C. Citi Open; 2021 Champion: (Italy) Jannik Sinner	San Jose; Mubadala Silicon Valley Classic; 2021 Champion: (United States) Danielle Collins
4	August 6 – August 15	Toronto; National Bank Open presented by Rogers; 2021 Champion: (Russia) Daniil Medvedev	Montreal; National Bank Open presented by Rogers; 2021 Champion: (Italy) Camila Giorgi
5	August 15 – August 22	Cincinnati; Western & Southern Open; 2021 Champion: (Germany) Alexander Zverev	Cincinnati; Western & Southern Open; 2021 Champion: (Australia) Ashleigh Barty
6	August 21 – August 28	Winston-Salem; Winston-Salem Open; 2021 Champion: (Belarus) Ilya Ivashka	Cleveland; Tennis in the Land; 2021 Champion: (Estonia) Anett Kontaveit
7–8	August 30 – September 12	New York; US Open; 2021 Champion: (Russia) Daniil Medvedev	New York; US Open; 2021 Champion: (United Kingdom) Emma Raducanu

== Week 1 ==
=== Hall of Fame Open ===
Semifinals
1	(Kazakhstan) Alexander Bublik	6	6^{3}	5
8/WC	(South Africa) Kevin Anderson	4	7^{7}	7
(United States) Jenson Brooksby	6	7^{7}
7	(Australia) Jordan Thompson	3	6^{3}

Final
8/WC	(South Africa) Kevin Anderson	7^{10}	6
(United States) Jenson Brooksby	6^{8}	4

== Week 2 ==
=== Truist Atlanta Open ===
Semifinals
SE	(United States) Brandon Nakashima	3	6	6
(Finland) Emil Ruusuvuori	6	4	3
5	(United States) Taylor Fritz	6^{4}	7	3
6	(United States) John Isner	7^{7}	5	6

Final
SE	(United States) Brandon Nakashima	6^{8}	5
6	(United States) John Isner	7^{10}	7

== Week 3 ==
=== Citi Open ===
Quarterfinals
14	(South Africa) Lloyd Harris	3	5
(Japan) Kei Nishikori	6	7
(United States) Mackenzie McDonald	6	6
(United States) Denis Kudla	3	2
5	(Italy) Jannik Sinner	6	6
(United States) Steve Johnson	4	2
11	(Australia) John Millman	1	2
WC	(United States) Jenson Brooksby	6	6

Semifinals
(Japan) Kei Nishikori	4	6	5
(United States) Mackenzie McDonald	6	3	7
5	(Italy) Jannik Sinner	7^{7}	6
WC	(United States) Jenson Brooksby	6^{2}	1

Final
(United States) Mackenzie McDonald	5	6	5
5	(Italy) Jannik Sinner	7	4	7

=== Mubadala Silicon Valley Classic ===
Semifinals
1	(Belgium) Elise Mertens	3	2
4	(Russia) Daria Kasatkina	6	6
Q	(Croatia) Ana Konjuh	0	2
7	(United States) Danielle Collins	6	6

Final
4	(Russia) Daria Kasatkina	3	7^{12}	1
7	(United States) Danielle Collins	6	6^{10}	6

== Week 4 ==
=== National Bank Open presented by Rogers ===
Quarterfinals
1	(Russia) Daniil Medvedev	2	7^{8}	7^{7}
7	(Poland) Hubert Hurkacz	6	6^{6}	6^{5}
(United States) John Isner	7^{7}	6
11	(France) Gaël Monfils	6^{5}	4
6	(Norway) Casper Ruud	1	4
3	(Greece) Stefanos Tsitsipas	6	6
10	(Spain) Roberto Bautista Agut	3	6^{1}
(United States) Reilly Opelka	6	7^{7}

Semifinals
1	(Russia) Daniil Medvedev	6	6
(United States) John Isner	2	2
3	(Greece) Stefanos Tsitsipas	7^{7}	6^{4}	4
(United States) Reilly Opelka	6^{2}	7^{7}	6

Final
1	(Russia) Daniil Medvedev	6	6
(United States) Reilly Opelka	4	3

Quarterfinals
1	(Belarus) Aryna Sabalenka	6	6
8	(Belarus) Victoria Azarenka	2	4
4	(Czech Republic) Karolína Plíšková	6	6
(Spain) Sara Sorribes Tormo	4	0
(Italy) Camila Giorgi	6	7^{7}
15	(United States) Coco Gauff	4	6^{2}
(United States) Jessica Pegula	1	7^{7}	6
13	(Tunisia) Ons Jabeur	6	6^{4}	0

Semifinals
1	(Belarus) Aryna Sabalenka	3	4
4	(Czech Republic) Karolína Plíšková	6	6
(Italy) Camila Giorgi	6	3	6
(United States) Jessica Pegula	3	6	1

Final
4	(Czech Republic) Karolína Plíšková	3	5
(Italy) Camila Giorgi	6	7

== Week 5 ==
=== Western & Southern Open ===
Quarterfinals
1	(Russia) Daniil Medvedev	6	6
7	(Spain) Pablo Carreño Busta	1	1
4	(Russia) Andrey Rublev	6	3	6
(France) Benoît Paire	2	6	3
8	(Norway) Casper Ruud	1	3
3	(Germany) Alexander Zverev	6	6
12	(Canada) Félix Auger-Aliassime	2	7	1
2	(Greece) Stefanos Tsitsipas	6	5	6

Semifinals
1	(Russia) Daniil Medvedev	6	3	3
4	(Russia) Andrey Rublev	2	6	6
3	(Germany) Alexander Zverev	6	3	7^{7}
2	(Greece) Stefanos Tsitsipas	4	6	6^{4}

Final
4	(Russia) Andrey Rublev	2	3
3	(Germany) Alexander Zverev	6	6

Quarterfinals
1	(Australia) Ashleigh Barty	6	6
9	(Czech Republic) Barbora Krejčíková	2	4
(Germany) Angelique Kerber	6	3
11	(Czech Republic) Petra Kvitová	4	3^{r}
5	(Czech Republic) Karolína Plíšková	7	2
(Spain) Paula Badosa	5	0^{r}
10	(Switzerland) Belinda Bencic	3	2
WC	(Switzerland) Jil Teichmann	6	6

Semifinals
1	(Australia) Ashleigh Barty	6	7
(Germany) Angelique Kerber	2	5
5	(Czech Republic) Karolína Plíšková	2	4
WC	(Switzerland) Jil Teichmann	6	6

Final
1	(Australia) Ashleigh Barty	6	6
WC	(Switzerland) Jil Teichmann	3	1

== Week 6 ==
=== Winston-Salem Open ===
Quarterfinals
1/WC	(Spain) Pablo Carreño Busta	6^{2}	3
(Belarus) Ilya Ivashka	7^{7}	6
14	(France) Richard Gasquet	6^{5}	1
(Finland) Emil Ruusuvuori	7^{7}	6
(United States) Marcos Giron	6^{2}	2
15	(Spain) Carlos Alcaraz	7^{7}	6
(Sweden) Mikael Ymer	6^{2}	6	6
13	(United States) Frances Tiafoe	7^{7}	2	3

Semifinals
(Belarus) Ilya Ivashka	6	6
(Finland) Emil Ruusuvuori	2	1
15	(Spain) Carlos Alcaraz	5	3
(Sweden) Mikael Ymer	7	6

Final
(Belarus) Ilya Ivashka	6	6
(Sweden) Mikael Ymer	0	2

=== Tennis in the Land ===
Semifinals
6	(Poland) Magda Linette	6^{5}	2
(Romania) Irina-Camelia Begu	7^{7}	6
7	(Spain) Sara Sorribes Tormo	4	4
2	(Estonia) Anett Kontaveit	6	6

Final
(Romania) Irina-Camelia Begu	6^{5}	4
2	(Estonia) Anett Kontaveit	7^{7}	6

== Weeks 7 & 8 ==
=== US Open ===
Quarterfinals
1	(Serbia) Novak Djokovic	5	6	6	6
6	(Italy) Matteo Berrettini	7	2	2	3
4	(Germany) Alexander Zverev	7^{8}	6	6
(South Africa) Lloyd Harris	6^{6}	3	4
12	(Canada) Félix Auger-Aliassime	6	3
(Spain) Carlos Alcaraz	3	1^{r}
Q	(Netherlands) Botic van de Zandschulp	3	0	6	5
2	(Russia) Daniil Medvedev	6	6	4	7

Semifinals
1	(Serbia) Novak Djokovic	4	6	6	4	6
4	(Germany) Alexander Zverev	6	2	4	6	2
12	(Canada) Félix Auger-Aliassime	4	5	2
2	(Russia) Daniil Medvedev	6	7	6

Final
1	(Serbia) Novak Djokovic	4	4	4
2	(Russia) Daniil Medvedev	6	6	6

Quarterfinals
Q	(United Kingdom) Emma Raducanu	6	6
11	(Switzerland) Belinda Bencic	3	4
4	(Czech Republic) Karolína Plíšková	4	4
17	(Greece) Maria Sakkari	6	6
5	(Ukraine) Elina Svitolina	3	6	6^{5}
(Canada) Leylah Fernandez	6	3	7^{7}
8	(Czech Republic) Barbora Krejčíková	1	4
2	(Belarus) Aryna Sabalenka	6	6

Semifinals
Q	(United Kingdom) Emma Raducanu	6	6
17	(Greece) Maria Sakkari	1	4
(Canada) Leylah Fernandez	7^{7}	4	6
2	(Belarus) Aryna Sabalenka	6^{3}	6	4

Final
Q	(United Kingdom) Emma Raducanu	6	6
(Canada) Leylah Fernandez	4	3
