= 2024 Tennis in the Land =

- Date: 18–24 August
- Edition: 4th
- Category: WTA 250
- Draw: 32S / 16D
- Surface: Hard / outdoor
- Location: Cleveland, United States
- Venue: Jacobs Pavilion

Champions

Singles
- (United States) McCartney Kessler

Doubles
- (Spain) Cristina Bucșa / (China) Xu Yifan
| ← 2023 · | Tennis in the Land | · 2025 → |

The 2024 Tennis in the Land event, sponsored by Rocket Mortgage, was a professional women's tennis tournament played on outdoor hard courts at Topnotch Stadium, a temporary tennis-specific stadium built in The Flats in Cleveland, Ohio. It was the fourth edition of the tournament and part of the WTA 250 category of the 2024 WTA Tour.

== Champions ==
=== Singles ===
- (United States) McCartney Kessler def. (Brazil) Beatriz Haddad Maia, 1–6, 6–1, 7–5

=== Doubles ===
- (Spain) Cristina Bucșa / (China) Xu Yifan def. (Japan) Shuko Aoyama / (Japan) Eri Hozumi 3–6, 6–3, [10–6]

== Singles main-draw entrants ==
=== Seeds ===
| Country | Player | Rank^{1} | Seed |
|---|---|---|---|
| BRA | Beatriz Haddad Maia | 22 | 1 |
| CAN | Leylah Fernandez | 26 | 2 |
| CZE | Kateřina Siniaková | 38 | 3 |
| CHN | Wang Xinyu | 41 | 4 |
| | Anastasia Potapova | 44 | 5 |
| USA | Peyton Stearns | 46 | 6 |
| BUL | Viktoriya Tomova | 50 | 7 |
| USA | Sofia Kenin | 56 | 8 |

- Rankings are as of 12 August 2024.

=== Other entrants ===
The following players received wild cards into the main draw:

- (United States) Lauren Davis
- (United States) McCartney Kessler
- (United States) Katrina Scott

The following players received entry from the qualifying draw:

- (Romania) Ana Bogdan
- (Spain) Jéssica Bouzas Maneiro
- (Switzerland) Viktorija Golubic
- (Japan) Sayaka Ishii

The following players received entry as lucky losers:

- (United States) Elvina Kalieva
- (Belgium) Greet Minnen

=== Withdrawal ===
- (United States) Bernarda Pera → replaced by (United States) Elvina Kalieva
- Liudmila Samsonova → replaced by (Belgium) Greet Minnen

== Doubles main-draw entrants ==
=== Seeds ===
| Country | Player | Country | Player | Rank^{1} | Seed |
|---|---|---|---|---|---|
| TPE | Chan Hao-ching | JPN | Miyu Kato | 55 | 1 |
| ESP | Cristina Bucșa | CHN | Xu Yifan | 70 | 2 |
| JPN | Shuko Aoyama | JPN | Eri Hozumi | 96 | 3 |
| CHN | Wang Xinyu | CHN | Zheng Saisai | 102 | 4 |

- Rankings are as of 12 August 2024.

=== Other entrants ===
The following pairs received wildcards into the doubles main draw:

- (Hong Kong) Eudice Chong / (United States) Katrina Scott
- (Canada) Bianca Fernandez / (Canada) Leylah Fernandez
