= 2024 Championnats Banque Nationale de Granby =

Tennis tournament

- Date: 15–21 July 2024
- Edition: 29th (men); 12th (women)
- Category: ATP Challenger Tour; ITF Women's World Tennis Tour
- Prize money: $82,000 (men) $60,000 (women)
- Surface: Hard / Outdoor
- Location: Granby, Canada

Champions

Men's singles
- (China) Bu Yunchaokete

Women's singles
- (United States) Maria Mateas

Men's doubles
- (Ecuador) Andrés Andrade / (United States) Mac Kiger

Women's doubles
- (Canada) Ariana Arseneault / (Canada) Mia Kupres
- Championnats de Granby

The 2024 Championnats Banque Nationale de Granby was a professional tennis tournament played on outdoor hard courts. It was the twenty-ninth (men) and twelfth (women) editions of the tournament, which were part of the 2024 ATP Challenger Tour and the 2024 ITF Women's World Tennis Tour. It took place in Granby, Quebec, between 15 and 21 July 2024.

== Champions ==
=== Men's singles ===
- (China) Bu Yunchaokete def. (France) Térence Atmane 6–3, 6–7^{(7–9)}, 6–4.

=== Women's singles ===
- (United States) Maria Mateas def. (Canada) Kayla Cross 6–3, 7–6^{(7–3)}

=== Men's doubles ===
- (Ecuador) Andrés Andrade / (United States) Mac Kiger def. (Canada) Justin Boulais / (Canada) Joshua Lapadat 3–6, 6–3, [10–2].

=== Women's doubles ===
- (Canada) Ariana Arseneault / (Canada) Mia Kupres def. (Chinese Taipei) Liang En-shuo / (South Korea) Park So-hyun, 6–4, 2–6, [10–6]

== Men's singles main-draw entrants ==
=== Seeds ===
Country	Player	Rank^{1}	Seed
AUS	Adam Walton	101	1
FRA	Térence Atmane	131	2
FRA	Benjamin Bonzi	150	3
CAN	Alexis Galarneau	169	4
FRA	Hugo Grenier	183	5
CHN	Bu Yunchaokete	197	6
JPN	Yasutaka Uchiyama	203	7
USA	Tristan Boyer	208	8

- ^{1} Rankings are as of July 1, 2024.

=== Other entrants ===
The following players received wildcards into the singles main draw:

- (Canada) Taha Baadi
- (Canada) Justin Boulais
- (Canada) Vasek Pospisil

The following players received entry into the singles main draw as alternates:

- (Ecuador) Andrés Andrade
- (Jamaica) Blaise Bicknell

The following players received entry from the qualifying draw:

- (Canada) Cleeve Harper
- (United States) Stefan Kozlov
- (United States) Bruno Kuzuhara
- (United States) Patrick Maloney
- (Japan) Rio Noguchi
- (Japan) Kaichi Uchida

== Women's singles main draw entrants ==
=== Seeds ===
Country	Player	Rank	Seed
USA	Maria Mateas	253	1
USA	Victoria Hu	273	2
MEX	Ana Sofía Sánchez	285	3
USA	Elvina Kalieva	301	4
TPE	Liang En-shuo	308	5
USA	Jamie Loeb	311	6
JPN	Kyōka Okamura	337	7
CAN	Carson Branstine	339	8

- Rankings are as of 1 July 2024.

=== Other entrants ===
The following players received wildcards into the singles main draw:

- (Canada) Jessica Luisa Alsola
- (Canada) Ariana Arseneault
- (Canada) Bianca Fernandez
- (Canada) Mia Kupres

The following player received entry into the singles main draw using a special ranking:

- (United States) Usue Maitane Arconada

The following players received entry from the qualifying draw:

- (United States) Ayana Akli
- (Canada) Isabelle Boulais
- (Canada) Jada Bui
- (United States) Eryn Cayetano
- (United States) Jenna DeFalco
- (Japan) Nagi Hanatani
- (United States) Jada Robinson
- (United States) Amy Zhu

The following player received entry as a lucky loser:

- (United States) Jaeda Daniel
