= 2022 Tennis in the Land – Singles =

Singles
- 2022 Tennis in the Land

Final
- Champion: Liudmila Samsonova
- Runner-up: Aliaksandra Sasnovich
- Score: 6–1, 6–3

Details
- Draw: 32 (4Q / 4WC)
- Seeds: 8

Events
Singles	Doubles
← 2021 ·	Tennis in the Land	· 2023 →

Liudmila Samsonova defeated Aliaksandra Sasnovich in the final, 6–1, 6–3 to win the singles tennis title at the 2022 Tennis in the Land. It was Samsonova's third career WTA Tour title, and she won the title without dropping a set. It was also her second straight title, following Washington three weeks earlier.

Anett Kontaveit was the reigning champion, but did not participate.

== Seeds ==
1. (Czech Republic) Barbora Krejčíková (second round)
2. (Italy) Martina Trevisan (second round, withdrew)
3. Ekaterina Alexandrova (second round)
4. (Belgium) Elise Mertens (withdrew)
5. (Romania) Irina-Camelia Begu (second round)
6. (France) Caroline Garcia (withdrew)
7. Aliaksandra Sasnovich (final)
8. (France) Alizé Cornet (semifinals)

== Draw ==
=== Key ===
- Q = Qualifier
- WC = Wild card
- LL = Lucky loser
- Alt = Alternate
- SE = Special exempt
- PR = Protected ranking
- ITF = ITF entry
- JE = Junior exempt
- w/o = Walkover
- r = Retired
- d = Defaulted
- SR = Special ranking

=== Finals ===
Semifinals
(United States) Bernarda Pera	1	2
Liudmila Samsonova	6	6
7	Aliaksandra Sasnovich	6^{5}	7	6
8	(France) Alizé Cornet	7^{7}	5	3

Final
Liudmila Samsonova	6	6
7	Aliaksandra Sasnovich	1	3

=== Top half ===
First round
1/WC	(Czech Republic) B Krejčíková	6	6
LL	(United States) F Di Lorenzo	3	1
Q	(Japan) E Hozumi	1	2
(United States) B Pera	6	6
WC	(United States) S Kenin	6	6
Q	(United States) D Hewitt	4	3
WC	(United States) P Stearns	4	3
5	(Romania) I-C Begu	6	6
LL	(Mexico) M Zacarías	2	3
(Romania) S Cîrstea	6	6
(Poland) M Linette	6	6
(Kazakhstan) Y Putintseva	4	2
Q	(Germany) L Siegemund	6	4	6
(Ukraine) A Kalinina	2	6	2
L Samsonova	6	6
LL	I Shymanovich	1	0

Second round
1/WC	(Czech Republic) B Krejčíková	4	1
(United States) B Pera	6	6
WC	(United States) S Kenin	6	6
5	(Romania) I-C Begu	3	2
(Romania) S Cîrstea	4	2
(Poland) M Linette	6	6
Q	(Germany) L Siegemund	2	1
L Samsonova	6	6

Quarterfinals
(United States) B Pera	6	5	6
WC	(United States) S Kenin	2	7	3
(Poland) M Linette	4	3
L Samsonova	6	6

Semifinals
(United States) B Pera	1	2
L Samsonova	6	6

=== Bottom half ===
First round
7	A Sasnovich	7^{7}	6
(Serbia) A Krunić	6^{5}	1
(Spain) S Sorribes Tormo	7^{7}	4	6
(Colombia) C Osorio	6^{5}	6	3
V Gracheva	3	6	5
(United States) M Brengle	6	4	7
WC	(United States) L Davis	6	2	4
3	E Alexandrova	4	6	6
8	(France) A Cornet	6	6
(Ukraine) D Yastremska	2	1
(Denmark) C Tauson	6	6
Q	(France) H Tan	3	1
(China) S Zhang	6	6
(Czech Republic) K Siniaková	2	1
(Egypt) M Sherif	6	2	4
2	(Italy) M Trevisan	2	6	6

Second round
7	A Sasnovich	4	6	6
(Spain) S Sorribes Tormo	6	3	3
(United States) M Brengle	3	7	7
3	E Alexandrova	6	5	5
8	(France) A Cornet	6	7^{7}
(Denmark) C Tauson	3	6^{1}
(China) S Zhang	w/o
2	(Italy) M Trevisan

Quarterfinals
7	A Sasnovich	6	6
(United States) M Brengle	4	1
8	(France) A Cornet	6	6
(China) S Zhang	4	2

Semifinals
7	A Sasnovich	6^{5}	7	6
8	(France) A Cornet	7^{7}	5	3

== Qualifying ==
=== Seeds ===
1. (Czech Republic) Kateřina Siniaková (moved to main draw)
2. (France) Harmony Tan (qualified)
3. (Mexico) Marcela Zacarías (qualifying competition, lucky loser)
4. (Germany) Laura Siegemund (qualified)
5. (United States) Francesca Di Lorenzo (qualifying competition, lucky loser)
6. (United States) Grace Min (first round)
7. (Georgia (country)) Mariam Bolkvadze (first round)
8. Iryna Shymanovich (qualifying competition, lucky loser)

=== Qualifiers ===
1. (Japan) Eri Hozumi
2. (France) Harmony Tan
3. (United States) Dalayna Hewitt
4. (Germany) Laura Siegemund

=== Lucky losers ===
1. (Mexico) Marcela Zacarías
2. (United States) Francesca Di Lorenzo
3. Iryna Shymanovich

=== Qualifying draw ===
==== First qualifier ====
First round
Alt	(Japan) Eri Hozumi	6	6
(China) Han Xinyun	4	2
(Kazakhstan) Anna Danilina	6	4	4
8	Iryna Shymanovich	1	6	6

Qualifying competition
Alt	(Japan) Eri Hozumi	3	6	6
8	Iryna Shymanovich	6	1	4

==== Second qualifier ====
First round
2	(France) Harmony Tan	6	7
(Indonesia) Aldila Sutjiadi	3	5
(United States) Jessie Aney	6	7
7	(Georgia (country)) Mariam Bolkvadze	4	5

Qualifying competition
2	(France) Harmony Tan	7	6
(United States) Jessie Aney	5	4

==== Third qualifier ====
First round
3	(Mexico) Marcela Zacarías	6	3	6
(United States) Victoria Duval	4	6	2
WC	(United States) Dalayna Hewitt	7	6
6	(United States) Grace Min	5	3

Qualifying competition
3	(Mexico) Marcela Zacarías	6	4	4
WC	(United States) Dalayna Hewitt	2	6	6

==== Fourth qualifier ====
First round
4	(Germany) Laura Siegemund	6	6
WC	(United States) Akasha Urhobo	4	3
(United States) Maegan Manasse	4	4
5	(United States) Francesca Di Lorenzo	6	6

Qualifying competition
4	(Germany) Laura Siegemund	7	6
5	(United States) Francesca Di Lorenzo	5	2
