= 2024 Tennis in the Land – Doubles =

Doubles
- 2024 Tennis in the Land

Final
- Champions: (Spain) Cristina Bucșa (China) Xu Yifan
- Runners-up: (Japan) Shuko Aoyama (Japan) Eri Hozumi
- Score: 3–6, 6–3, [10–6]

Details
- Draw: 16
- Seeds: 4

Events
Singles	Doubles
← 2023 ·	Tennis in the Land	· 2025 →

Cristina Bucșa and Xu Yifan won the doubles title at the 2024 Tennis in the Land, defeating Shuko Aoyama and Eri Hozumi in the final, 3–6, 6–3, [10–6].

Miyu Kato and Aldila Sutjiadi were the reigning champions, but Sutjiadi chose to compete in Monterrey instead. Kato partnered with Chan Hao-ching, but lost in the first round to Carmen and Ivana Corley.

== Seeds ==
1. (Chinese Taipei) Chan Hao-ching / (Japan) Miyu Kato (first round)
2. (Spain) Cristina Bucșa / (China) Xu Yifan (champions)
3. (Japan) Shuko Aoyama / (Japan) Eri Hozumi (final)
4. (China) Wang Xinyu / (China) Zheng Saisai (quarterfinals)

== Draw ==
=== Key ===
- Q = Qualifier
- WC = Wild card
- LL = Lucky loser
- Alt = Alternate
- ITF = ITF entry
- PR = Protected ranking
- SR = Special ranking
- SE = Special exempt
- JE = Junior exempt
- JR = Junior Accelerator Programme entrant
- CO = College Accelerator Programme entrant
- NG = Next Gen Accelerator Program entrant
- w/o = Walkover
- r = Retired
- d = Defaulted

=== Draw ===
First round
1	(Chinese Taipei) H-c Chan (Japan) M Kato	6^{2}	6	[8]
(United States) C Corley (United States) I Corley	7^{7}	2	[10]
(United States) L Davis (United States) S Rogers	7	0	[10]
WC	(Hong Kong) E Chong (United States) K Scott	5	6	[2]
3	(Japan) S Aoyama (Japan) E Hozumi	6	6
(United Kingdom) M Lumsden (Czech Republic) A Sisková	2	1
(Denmark) C Tauson (Japan) M Uchijima	7^{7}	1	[4]
(Italy) A Moratelli (United States) S Santamaria	6^{4}	6	[10]
(United States) J Aney (Germany) L Papadakis	4	4
(United Kingdom) S Murray Sharan (United Kingdom) E Silva	6	6
(United Kingdom) E Appleton (United Kingdom) T Moore	6	4	[9]
4	(China) Xin Wang (China) S Zheng	4	6	[11]
WC	(Canada) B Fernandez (Canada) L Fernandez	4	3
(United States) Q Gleason (Brazil) I Martins	6	6
Y Sizikova (Chinese Taipei) F-h Wu	7^{7}	3	[7]
2	(Spain) C Bucșa (China) Y Xu	6^{4}	6	[10]

Quarterfinals
(United States) C Corley (United States) I Corley	6	6
(United States) L Davis (United States) S Rogers	3	2
3	(Japan) S Aoyama (Japan) E Hozumi	6	6
(Italy) A Moratelli (United States) S Santamaria	2	0
(United Kingdom) S Murray Sharan (United Kingdom) E Silva	6	6
4	(China) Xin Wang (China) S Zheng	4	1
(United States) Q Gleason (Brazil) I Martins	3	4
2	(Spain) C Bucșa (China) Y Xu	6	6

Semifinals
(United States) C Corley (United States) I Corley	4	2
3	(Japan) S Aoyama (Japan) E Hozumi	6	6
(United Kingdom) S Murray Sharan (United Kingdom) E Silva	3	2
2	(Spain) C Bucșa (China) Y Xu	6	6

Final
3	(Japan) S Aoyama (Japan) E Hozumi	6	3	[6]
2	(Spain) C Bucșa (China) Y Xu	3	6	[10]
