= 2023 Championnats Banque Nationale de Granby – Men's singles =

Men's singles
- 2023 Championnats Banque Nationale de Granby

Final
- Champion: (Canada) Alexis Galarneau
- Runner-up: (Australia) Philip Sekulic
- Score: 6–4, 3–6, 6–3

Events
Singles	men	women
Doubles	men	women
← 2022 ·	Challenger de Granby	· 2024 →

Gabriel Diallo was the defending champion but chose not to defend his title.

Alexis Galarneau won the title after defeating Philip Sekulic 6–4, 3–6, 6–3 in the final.

== Seeds ==
1. (Australia) Thanasi Kokkinakis (second round, retired)
2. (France) Arthur Cazaux (second round)
3. (China) Shang Juncheng (first round)
4. (Canada) Vasek Pospisil (first round)
5. (United States) Denis Kudla (second round)
6. (Japan) Rio Noguchi (first round)
7. (Canada) Alexis Galarneau (champion)
8. (France) Giovanni Mpetshi Perricard (first round)

== Draw ==
=== Key ===
- Q = Qualifier
- WC = Wild card
- LL = Lucky loser
- Alt = Alternate
- ITF = ITF entry
- PR = Protected ranking
- SR = Special ranking
- SE = Special exempt
- JE = Junior exempt
- JR = Junior Accelerator Programme entrant
- CO = College Accelerator Programme entrant
- NG = Next Gen Accelerator Program entrant
- w/o = Walkover
- r = Retired
- d = Defaulted

=== Finals ===
Semifinals
Q	(Japan) James Trotter	4	6	6^{3}
Q	(Australia) Philip Sekulic	6	2	7^{7}
(Chinese Taipei) Wu Tung-lin	6^{4}	3
7	(Canada) Alexis Galarneau	7^{7}	6

Final
Q	(Australia) Philip Sekulic	4	6	3
7	(Canada) Alexis Galarneau	6	3	6

=== Top half ===
First round
1	(Australia) T Kokkinakis	6	6^{6}	6
Q	(United States) P Kypson	2	7^{8}	4
Q	(Japan) J Trotter	6	7^{7}
LL	(United States) Nathan Ponwith	3	6^{1}
(Australia) J McCabe	7^{7}	6
(United States) T Sandgren	6^{4}	3
(Australia) D Sweeny	3	6	6
8	(France) G Mpetshi Perricard	6	4	4
3	(China) J Shang	2	2
(Estonia) M Lajal	6	6
Q	(Jamaica) B Bicknell	0	6	4
WC	(Canada) J Boulais	6	4	6
Q	(Australia) P Sekulic	6^{6}	7^{7}	6
(Japan) Y Uchiyama	7^{8}	6^{4}	1
(Japan) H Moriya	4	7	2
5	(United States) D Kudla	6	5	6

Second round
1	(Australia) T Kokkinakis	6^{5}	0^{r}
Q	(Japan) J Trotter	7^{7}	2
(Australia) J McCabe	6	6
(Australia) D Sweeny	4	2
(Estonia) M Lajal	4	6	6^{5}
WC	(Canada) J Boulais	6	1	7^{7}
Q	(Australia) P Sekulic	7	6
5	(United States) D Kudla	5	3

Quarterfinals
Q	(Japan) J Trotter	7^{10}	6
(Australia) J McCabe	6^{8}	2
WC	(Canada) J Boulais	3	2
Q	(Australia) P Sekulic	6	6

Semifinals
Q	(Japan) J Trotter	4	6	6^{3}
Q	(Australia) P Sekulic	6	2	7^{7}

=== Bottom half ===
First round
6	(Japan) R Noguchi	0	2
(Chinese Taipei) T-l Wu	6	6
LL	(Moldova) A Cozbinov	1	3
PR	(United States) C Harrison	6	6
(France) M Janvier	7^{8}	6
(Chinese Taipei) J Jung	6^{6}	3
(Australia) A Walton	6^{7}	7^{7}	6
4	(Canada) V Pospisil	7^{9}	6^{1}	1
7	(Canada) A Galarneau	6	3	6
(Australia) O Jasika	1	6	3
Q	(United States) N Chappell	5	3
PR	(United States) T-S Kwiatkowski	7	6
Alt	(Australia) T Schoolkate	6	6
Q	(United States) J Sheehy	2	3
(Vietnam) NH Lý	1	6^{7}
2	(France) A Cazaux	6	7^{9}

Second round
(Chinese Taipei) T-l Wu	6	6
PR	(United States) C Harrison	3	4
(France) M Janvier	6	4	7^{7}
(Australia) A Walton	4	6	6^{4}
7	(Canada) A Galarneau	6	7^{8}
PR	(United States) T-S Kwiatkowski	2	6^{6}
Alt	(Australia) T Schoolkate	6	6
2	(France) A Cazaux	3	3

Quarterfinals
(Chinese Taipei) T-l Wu	6	6
(France) M Janvier	4	4
7	(Canada) A Galarneau	6	6
Alt	(Australia) T Schoolkate	4	3

Semifinals
(Chinese Taipei) T-l Wu	6^{4}	3
7	(Canada) A Galarneau	7^{7}	6
