= 2022 Tennis in the Land – Doubles =

Doubles
- 2022 Tennis in the Land

Final
- Champions: (United States) Nicole Melichar-Martinez (Australia) Ellen Perez
- Runners-up: (Kazakhstan) Anna Danilina (Serbia) Aleksandra Krunić
- Score: 7–5, 6–3

Details
- Draw: 16
- Seeds: 4

Events
Singles	Doubles
← 2021 ·	Tennis in the Land	· 2023 →

Nicole Melichar-Martinez and Ellen Perez defeated Anna Danilina and Aleksandra Krunić in the final, 7–5, 6–3 to win the doubles tennis title at the 2022 Tennis in the Land.

Shuko Aoyama and Ena Shibahara were the reigning champions, but Shibahara competed in Granby instead. Aoyama partnered Chan Hao-ching, but lost in the semifinals to Melichar-Martinez and Perez.

== Seeds ==
1. (Czech Republic) Barbora Krejčíková / (Czech Republic) Kateřina Siniaková (semifinals, withdrew)
2. (United States) Nicole Melichar-Martinez / (Australia) Ellen Perez (champions)
3. (Japan) Shuko Aoyama / (Chinese Taipei) Chan Hao-ching (semifinals)
4. (Kazakhstan) Anna Danilina / (Serbia) Aleksandra Krunić (final)

== Draw ==
=== Key ===
- Q = Qualifier
- WC = Wild card
- LL = Lucky loser
- Alt = Alternate
- SE = Special exempt
- PR = Protected ranking
- ITF = ITF entry
- JE = Junior exempt
- w/o = Walkover
- r = Retired
- d = Defaulted
- SR = Special ranking

=== Draw ===
First round
1	(Czech Republic) B Krejčíková (Czech Republic) K Siniaková	6	6
(Brazil) I Gamarra Martins (United Kingdom) E Webley-Smith	3	2
(Chinese Taipei) L Chan (Australia) S Stosur	3	6	[5]
E Alexandrova (Germany) V Heisen	6	4	[10]
4	(Kazakhstan) A Danilina (Serbia) A Krunić	7^{7}	2	[10]
(United States) M Brengle (United States) L Davis	6^{5}	6	[7]
(China) X Han (Japan) E Hozumi	1	2
(Japan) M Kato (Indonesia) A Sutjiadi	6	6
WC	(United States) F Di Lorenzo (Mexico) M Zacarías	6	6
(United States) K Christian; L Marozava	0	1
(Colombia) C Osorio (Denmark) C Tauson	1	1
3	(Japan) S Aoyama (Chinese Taipei) H-c Chan	6	6
WC	(United States) D Hewitt (United States) P Stearns	6	6
(France) E Lechemia (Germany) J Lohoff	4	3
(Egypt) M Sherif; Y Sizikova	4	3
2	(United States) N Melichar-Martinez (Australia) E Perez	6	6

Quarterfinals
1	(Czech Republic) B Krejčíková (Czech Republic) K Siniaková	6	5	[10]
E Alexandrova (Germany) V Heisen	3	7	[3]
4	(Kazakhstan) A Danilina (Serbia) A Krunić	6	6^{4}	[10]
(Japan) M Kato (Indonesia) A Sutjiadi	2	7^{7}	[7]
WC	(United States) F Di Lorenzo (Mexico) M Zacarías	2	3
3	(Japan) S Aoyama (Chinese Taipei) H-c Chan	6	6
WC	(United States) D Hewitt (United States) P Stearns	3	7	[5]
2	(United States) N Melichar-Martinez (Australia) E Perez	6	5	[10]

Semifinals
1	(Czech Republic) B Krejčíková (Czech Republic) K Siniaková
4	(Kazakhstan) A Danilina (Serbia) A Krunić	w/o
3	(Japan) S Aoyama (Chinese Taipei) H-c Chan	1	6^{0}
2	(United States) N Melichar-Martinez (Australia) E Perez	6	7^{7}

Final
4	(Kazakhstan) A Danilina (Serbia) A Krunić	5	3
2	(United States) N Melichar-Martinez (Australia) E Perez	7	6
