= 2022 Tennis in the Land =

- Date: August 21–27
- Edition: 2nd
- Category: WTA 250
- Draw: 32S / 16D
- Prize money: $251,750
- Surface: Hard / outdoor
- Location: Cleveland, United States
- Venue: Jacobs Pavilion

Champions

Singles
- Liudmila Samsonova

Doubles
- (United States) Nicole Melichar-Martinez / (Australia) Ellen Perez
- Tennis in the Land

The 2022 Tennis in the Land event was a professional women's tennis tournament played on outdoor hard courts at Jacobs Pavilion. It was the second edition of the tournament held in the city of Cleveland, Ohio and was a part of the WTA 250 category of the 2022 WTA Tour.

== Champions ==
=== Singles ===
- Liudmila Samsonova def. Aliaksandra Sasnovich 6–1, 6–3

This is Samsonova's second title of the year and third of her career.

=== Doubles ===
- (United States) Nicole Melichar-Martinez / (Australia) Ellen Perez def. (Kazakhstan) Anna Danilina / (Serbia) Aleksandra Krunić 7–5, 6–3

== Points and prize money ==
=== Point distribution ===
Event	W	F	SF	QF	Round of 16	Round of 32	Q	Q2	Q1
Women's singles	280	180	110	60	30	1	18	12	1
Women's doubles	280	180	110	60	1	—N/a	—N/a	—N/a	—N/a

=== Prize money ===
Event	W	F	SF	QF	Round of 16	Round of 32^{1}	Q2	Q1
Women's singles	$31,000	$18,037	$10,100	$5,800	$3,675	$2,675	$1,950	$1,270
Women's doubles*	$10,800	$6,300	$3,800	$2,300	$1,750	—N/a	—N/a	—N/a

_{^{1}Qualifiers prize money is also the Round of 32 prize money.}
_{*per team}

== Singles main-draw entrants ==
=== Seeds ===
Country	Player	Rank^{1}	Seed
CZE	Barbora Krejčiková	19	1
ITA	Martina Trevisan	26	2
	Ekaterina Alexandrova	27	3
~~BEL~~	~~Elise Mertens~~	~~33~~	~~4~~
ROU	Irina-Camelia Begu	34	5
~~FRA~~	~~Caroline Garcia~~	~~35~~	~~6~~
	Aliaksandra Sasnovich	36	7
FRA	Alizé Cornet	37	8

- Rankings are as of August 15, 2022.

=== Other entrants ===
The following players received wildcards into the main draw:

- (United States) Lauren Davis
- (United States) Sofia Kenin
- (Czech Republic) Barbora Krejčíková
- (United States) Peyton Stearns

The following players received entry from the qualifying draw:

- (United States) Dalayna Hewitt
- (Japan) Eri Hozumi
- (Germany) Laura Siegemund
- (France) Harmony Tan

The following players received entry as lucky losers:

- (United States) Francesca Di Lorenzo
- Iryna Shymanovich
- (Mexico) Marcela Zacarías

=== Withdrawals ===
Before the tournament

- (France) Caroline Garcia → replaced by Iryna Shymanovich
- (Italy) Camila Giorgi → replaced by (Poland) Magda Linette
- (Estonia) Kaia Kanepi → replaced by (Serbia) Aleksandra Krunić
- (United States) Ann Li → replaced by (Colombia) Camila Osorio
- (Belgium) Elise Mertens → replaced by (Mexico) Marcela Zacarías
- Anastasia Potapova → replaced by (United States) Francesca Di Lorenzo
- (United States) Shelby Rogers → replaced by (Ukraine) Dayana Yastremska

== Doubles main-draw entrants ==
=== Seeds ===
Country	Player	Country	Player	Rank^{1}	Seed
CZE	Barbora Krejčiková	CZE	Kateřina Siniaková	10	1
USA	Nicole Melichar-Martinez	AUS	Ellen Perez	62	2
JPN	Shuko Aoyama	TPE	Chan Hao-ching	64	3
KAZ	Anna Danilina	SRB	Aleksandra Krunić	66	4

- Rankings are as of August 15, 2022.

=== Other entrants ===
The following pairs received wildcards into the doubles main draw:

- (United States) Francesca Di Lorenzo / (Mexico) Marcela Zacarías
- (United States) Dalayna Hewitt / (United States) Peyton Stearns

=== Withdrawals ===
Before the tournament

- (Chile) Alexa Guarachi / (Slovenia) Andreja Klepač → replaced by (France) Elixane Lechemia / (Germany) Julia Lohoff
- (Japan) Eri Hozumi / (Japan) Makoto Ninomiya → replaced by (China) Han Xinyun / (Japan) Eri Hozumi
- Anastasia Potapova / Yana Sizikova → replaced by (Egypt) Mayar Sherif / Yana Sizikova
- (China) Xu Yifan / (China) Yang Zhaoxuan → replaced by (Brazil) Ingrid Gamarra Martins / (United Kingdom) Emily Webley-Smith
