= 2021 Tennis in the Land – Doubles =

Doubles
- 2021 Tennis in the Land

Final
- Champions: (Japan) Shuko Aoyama (Japan) Ena Shibahara
- Runners-up: (United States) Christina McHale (India) Sania Mirza
- Score: 7–5, 6–3

Details
- Draw: 16
- Seeds: 4

Events
Singles	Doubles
Tennis in the Land	· 2022 →

This was the first edition of the tournament.

Shuko Aoyama and Ena Shibahara won the title, defeating Christina McHale and Sania Mirza in the final, 7–5, 6–3.

== Seeds ==
1. (Japan) Shuko Aoyama / (Japan) Ena Shibahara (champions)
2. (Chile) Alexa Guarachi / (United States) Desirae Krawczyk (first round)
3. (Czech Republic) Lucie Hradecká / (China) Zhang Shuai (quarterfinals)
4. (United States) Bethanie Mattek-Sands / (United States) Shelby Rogers (semifinals)

== Draw ==
=== Key ===
- Q = Qualifier
- WC = Wild card
- LL = Lucky loser
- Alt = Alternate
- SE = Special exempt
- PR = Protected ranking
- ITF = ITF entry
- JE = Junior exempt
- w/o = Walkover
- r = Retired
- d = Defaulted
- SR = Special ranking

=== Draw ===
First round
1	(Japan) S Aoyama (Japan) E Shibahara	6	6
PR	(Australia) An Rodionova (Kazakhstan) G Voskoboeva	4	3
(Kazakhstan) A Danilina (Belarus) L Marozava	6	7
(Chinese Taipei) C-y Hsu (Indonesia) J Rompies	3	5
4	(United States) B Mattek-Sands (United States) S Rogers	6	6
WC	(United States) M Mateas (Kazakhstan) Y Shvedova	1	4
(Germany) J Lohoff (Czech Republic) R Voráčová	6	4	[10]
(Russia) E Alexandrova (Russia) V Zvonareva	0	6	[6]
(United States) C McHale (India) S Mirza	6	6
(Georgia (country)) O Kalashnikova (Romania) A Mitu	3	2
(Japan) M Kato (United States) S Santamaria	6	2	[5]
3	(Czech Republic) L Hradecká (China) S Zhang	2	6	[10]
(Norway) U Eikeri (United States) C Harrison	6	5	[10]
(United States) E Bektas (United Kingdom) T Moore	3	7	[7]
(France) E Lechemia (United States) I Neel	6	2	[10]
2	(Chile) A Guarachi (United States) D Krawczyk	1	6	[8]

Quarterfinals
1	(Japan) S Aoyama (Japan) E Shibahara	6	3	[10]
(Kazakhstan) A Danilina (Belarus) L Marozava	2	6	[8]
4	(United States) B Mattek-Sands (United States) S Rogers	6	6
(Germany) J Lohoff (Czech Republic) R Voráčová	3	2
(United States) C McHale (India) S Mirza	6	6
3	(Czech Republic) L Hradecká (China) S Zhang	3	3
(Norway) U Eikeri (United States) C Harrison	6	6
(France) E Lechemia (United States) I Neel	4	4

Semifinals
1	(Japan) S Aoyama (Japan) E Shibahara	7^{7}	1	[10]
4	(United States) B Mattek-Sands (United States) S Rogers	6^{4}	6	[7]
(United States) C McHale (India) S Mirza	7^{7}	6
(Norway) U Eikeri (United States) C Harrison	6^{5}	2

Final
1	(Japan) S Aoyama (Japan) E Shibahara	7	6
(United States) C McHale (India) S Mirza	5	3
