= 2023 Championnats Banque Nationale de Granby – Women's singles =

Women's singles
- 2023 Championnats Banque Nationale de Granby

Final
- Champion: (United States) Kayla Day
- Runner-up: (Canada) Katherine Sebov
- Score: 6–4, 2–6, 7–5

Events
Singles	men	women
Doubles	men	women
← 2022 ·	Championnats de Granby	· 2024 →

Kayla Day won the women's singles tournament at the 2023 Championnats Banque Nationale de Granby after defeating Katherine Sebov 6–4, 2–6, 7–5 in the final.

Daria Kasatkina was the defending champion but chose not to defend her title.

== Seeds ==
1. (Canada) Rebecca Marino (semifinals)
2. (United States) Ashlyn Krueger (semifinals)
3. (United States) Kayla Day (champion)
4. (United States) Emina Bektas (quarterfinals, retired)
5. (Canada) Katherine Sebov (final)
6. (Japan) Himeno Sakatsume (quarterfinals)
7. (United States) Katrina Scott (first round)
8. (Mexico) Marcela Zacarías (first round)

== Draw ==
=== Key ===
- Q = Qualifier
- WC = Wild card
- LL = Lucky loser
- Alt = Alternate
- SE = Special exempt
- PR = Protected ranking
- ITF = ITF entry
- JE = Junior exempt
- w/o = Walkover
- r = Retired
- d = Defaulted
- SR = Special ranking

=== Finals ===
Semifinals
1	(Canada) Rebecca Marino	6	4	2
5	(Canada) Katherine Sebov	4	6	6
3	(United States) Kayla Day	6	4	6
2	(United States) Ashlyn Krueger	3	6	1

Final
5	(Canada) Katherine Sebov	4	6	5
3	(United States) Kayla Day	6	2	7

=== Top Half ===
First round
1	(Canada) R Marino	7^{7}	6
Q	(Canada) R Verma	6^{3}	1
Q	(United States) E Cayetano	0	0
(United States) J Failla	6	6
(Canada) M Stakusic	6	6
Q	(United States) A Akli	4	0
Q	(United States) A Markham	6	2	6
7	(United States) K Scott	3	6	1
4	(United States) E Bektas	6	6
(United States) V Hu	3	3
(United States) M Jones	7^{7}	0	6
WC	(Canada) M Kupres	6^{4}	6	3
Q	(United States) C Corley	4	5
WC	(Canada) A Xu	6	7
Q	(Vietnam) S Lý Nguyễn	4	3
5	(Canada) K Sebov	6	6

Second round
1	(Canada) R Marino	6	6
(United States) J Failla	2	0
(Canada) M Stakusic	6	6
Q	(United States) A Markham	2	0
4	(United States) E Bektas	7^{7}	6
(United States) M Jones	6^{2}	4
WC	(Canada) A Xu	3	6^{3}
5	(Canada) K Sebov	6	7^{7}

Quarterfinals
1	(Canada) R Marino	6	6
(Canada) M Stakusic	2	4
4	(United States) E Bektas	2^{r}
5	(Canada) K Sebov	3

Semifinals
1	(Canada) R Marino	6	4	2
5	(Canada) K Sebov	4	6	6

=== Bottom Half ===
First round
8	(Mexico) M Zacarías	1	3
(Canada) C Brace	6	6
Q	(Paraguay) AP Neffa de los Ríos	3	2
(Canada) S Fung	6	1^{r}
Q	(United States) J Daniel	2	6	4
WC	(Canada) B Fernandez	6	4	6
(Mexico) R Zarazúa	4	4
3	(United States) K Day	6	6
6	(Japan) H Sakatsume	4	6	6
WC	(Canada) L Sleeth	6	1	2
PR	(United States) J Brady	6	6
(Japan) K Okamura	2	3
(United States) J Loeb	5	1
(Canada) V Mboko	7	6
(Canada) K Cross	3	4
2	(United States) A Krueger	6	6

Second round
(Canada) C Brace	6	6
Q	(Paraguay) AP Neffa de los Ríos	1	3
WC	(Canada) B Fernandez	3	3
3	(United States) K Day	6	6
6	(Japan) H Sakatsume	6	7^{7}
PR	(United States) J Brady	4	6^{2}
(Canada) V Mboko	2	3
2	(United States) A Krueger	6	6

Quarterfinals
(Canada) C Brace	2	4
3	(United States) K Day	6	6
6	(Japan) H Sakatsume	4	4
2	(United States) A Krueger	6	6

Semifinals
3	(United States) K Day	6	4	6
2	(United States) A Krueger	3	6	1
