= 2023 Championnats Banque Nationale de Granby – Men's doubles =

Men's doubles
- 2023 Championnats Banque Nationale de Granby

Final
- Champions: (United States) Christian Harrison (Latvia) Miķelis Lībietis
- Runners-up: (Australia) Tristan Schoolkate (Australia) Adam Walton
- Score: 6–4, 6–3

Events
Singles	men	women
Doubles	men	women
← 2022 ·	Challenger de Granby	· 2024 →

Julian Cash and Henry Patten were the defending champions but chose not to defend their title.

Christian Harrison and Miķelis Lībietis won the title after defeating Tristan Schoolkate and Adam Walton 6–4, 6–3 in the final.

== Seeds ==
1. (Philippines) Ruben Gonzales / (United States) Alex Lawson (first round)
2. (United States) Hunter Reese / (New Zealand) Artem Sitak (first round)
3. (India) Purav Raja / (India) Divij Sharan (quarterfinals)
4. (United States) Ezekiel Clark / (United States) Alfredo Perez (first round)

== Draw ==
=== Key ===
- Q = Qualifier
- WC = Wild card
- LL = Lucky loser
- Alt = Alternate
- ITF = ITF entry
- PR = Protected ranking
- SR = Special ranking
- SE = Special exempt
- JE = Junior exempt
- JR = Junior Accelerator Programme entrant
- CO = College Accelerator Programme entrant
- NG = Next Gen Accelerator Program entrant
- w/o = Walkover
- r = Retired
- d = Defaulted

First round
1	(Philippines) R Gonzales (United States) A Lawson	3	4
(United Kingdom) S Duncan (Canada) K Stevenson	6	6
(Australia) T Schoolkate (Australia) A Walton	7	6
(Australia) O Jasika (Japan) H Moriya	5	1
3	(India) P Raja (India) D Sharan	1
(France) M Janvier (Tunisia) M Jaziri	0^{r}
Alt	(Canada) J Boulais (Japan) J Trotter	7	6
WC	(Canada) T Baadi (Canada) Nicaise Muamba	5	1
PR	(United States) D Kudla (United States) T-S Kwiatkowski	7	1	[6]
(Northern Mariana Islands) C Sinclair (Australia) D Sweeny	5	6	[10]
(United States) C Harrison (Latvia) M Lībietis	6	6
4	(United States) Ezekiel Clark (United States) A Perez	0	2
Alt	(United States) N Chappell (United States) Colin Markes	1	6	[12]
(United States) M Kiger (Canada) B Sigouin	6	3	[10]
(Australia) J McCabe (New Zealand) A Rai	6	2	[10]
2	(United States) H Reese (New Zealand) A Sitak	4	6	[8]

Quarterfinals
(United Kingdom) S Duncan (Canada) K Stevenson	2	2
(Australia) T Schoolkate (Australia) A Walton	6	6
3	(India) P Raja (India) D Sharan	6	6^{5}	[5]
Alt	(Canada) J Boulais (Japan) J Trotter	4	7^{7}	[10]
(Northern Mariana Islands) C Sinclair (Australia) D Sweeny	1	1
(United States) C Harrison (Latvia) M Lībietis	6	6
Alt	(United States) N Chappell (United States) C Markes	6	6
(Australia) J McCabe (New Zealand) A Rai	2	4

Semifinals
(Australia) T Schoolkate (Australia) A Walton	6	6
Alt	(Canada) J Boulais (Japan) J Trotter	0	3
(United States) C Harrison (Latvia) M Lībietis	6	6
Alt	(United States) N Chappell (United States) C Markes	3	4

Final
(Australia) T Schoolkate (Australia) A Walton	4	3
(United States) C Harrison (Latvia) M Lībietis	6	6
