= 2025 Championnats Banque Nationale de Granby – Men's singles =

Men's singles
- 2025 Championnats Banque Nationale de Granby

Final
- Champion: (Denmark) August Holmgren
- Runner-up: (Canada) Liam Draxl
- Score: 6–3, 6–3

Events
Singles	men	women
Doubles	men	women
← 2024 ·	Championnats de Granby	· 2026 →

Bu Yunchaokete was the defending champion but chose not to defend his title.

August Holmgren won the title after defeating Liam Draxl 6–3, 6–3 in the final.

== Seeds ==
1. (United States) Eliot Spizzirri (semifinals)
2. (Belgium) Alexander Blockx (semifinals)
3. (Canada) Liam Draxl (final)
4. (Japan) Yosuke Watanuki (second round, withdrew)
5. (Japan) Sho Shimabukuro (quarterfinals)
6. (Denmark) August Holmgren (champion)
7. (Japan) James Trotter (quarterfinals)
8. (Australia) Omar Jasika (second round)

== Draw ==
=== Key ===
- Q = Qualifier
- WC = Wild card
- LL = Lucky loser
- Alt = Alternate
- ITF = ITF entry
- PR = Protected ranking
- SR = Special ranking
- SE = Special exempt
- JE = Junior exempt
- JR = Junior Accelerator Programme entrant
- CO = College Accelerator Programme entrant
- NG = Next Gen Accelerator Program entrant
- w/o = Walkover
- r = Retired
- d = Defaulted

=== Finals ===
Semifinals
1	(United States) Eliot Spizzirri	4	1
6	(Denmark) August Holmgren	6	6
3	(Canada) Liam Draxl	6	7^{7}
2	(Belgium) Alexander Blockx	4	6^{5}

Final
6	(Denmark) August Holmgren	6	6
3	(Canada) Liam Draxl	3	3

=== Top half ===
First round
1	(United States) E Spizzirri	6	6^{4}	6
(United Kingdom) P Jubb	4	7^{7}	2
(Ecuador) A Andrade	6	5	4
Alt	(United States) T Zink	3	7	6
(United States) P Kypson	6	6
Alt	(Japan) N Nakagawa	3	1
WC	(Canada) N Arseneault	6	5	3
7	(Japan) J Trotter	2	7	6
4	(Japan) Y Watanuki	6	6
(Brazil) K Sell	3	4
(Chinese Taipei) T-l Wu	4	6	5
(Japan) Y Shimizu	6	1	7
(Czech Republic) M Gengel	6	7^{7}
(China) Y Zhou	2	6^{2}
Q	(New Zealand) J Watt	7^{7}	6^{3}	4
6	(Denmark) A Holmgren	6^{5}	7^{7}	6

Second round
1	(United States) E Spizzirri	6	7^{7}
Alt	(United States) T Zink	2	6^{3}
(United States) P Kypson	6^{5}	7^{7}	4
7	(Japan) J Trotter	7^{7}	6^{5}	6
4	(Japan) Y Watanuki
(Japan) Y Shimizu	w/o
(Czech Republic) M Gengel	3	4
6	(Denmark) A Holmgren	6	6

Quarterfinals
1	(United States) E Spizzirri	6	6
7	(Japan) J Trotter	4	0
(Japan) Y Shimizu	4	6	3
6	(Denmark) A Holmgren	6	4	6

Semifinals
1	(United States) E Spizzirri	4	1
6	(Denmark) A Holmgren	6	6

=== Bottom half ===
First round
8	(Australia) O Jasika	7	6
WC	(Canada) J Boulais	5	2
(United States) A Mayo	3	4
(Canada) A Galarneau	6	6
Q	(Canada) Alexander Rozin	2	7^{7}	3
Q	(South Africa) Kris van Wyk	6	6^{2}	6
Q	(United States) A Perez	6	5	2
3	(Canada) L Draxl	3	7	6
5	(Japan) S Shimabukuro	6	6
WC	(Canada) JC Aguilar	2	1
(Japan) R Noguchi	6	6
PR	(Australia) P Sekulic	2	4
(Chinese Taipei) Y-h Hsu	7	6
Q	(United States) Patrick Maloney	5	3
Q	(United States) A Martin	5	2
2	(Belgium) A Blockx	7	6

Second round
8	(Australia) O Jasika	1	1
(Canada) A Galarneau	6	6
Q	(South Africa) K van Wyk	0	1
3	(Canada) L Draxl	6	6
5	(Japan) S Shimabukuro	6	5	6
(Japan) R Noguchi	3	7	2
(Chinese Taipei) Y-h Hsu	5	0
2	(Belgium) A Blockx	7	6

Quarterfinals
(Canada) A Galarneau	1	6	1
3	(Canada) L Draxl	6	4	6
5	(Japan) S Shimabukuro	2	3
2	(Belgium) A Blockx	6	6

Semifinals
3	(Canada) L Draxl	6	7^{7}
2	(Belgium) A Blockx	4	6^{5}
