= 2024 Championnats Banque Nationale de Granby – Men's singles =

Men's singles
- 2024 Championnats Banque Nationale de Granby

Final
- Champion: (China) Bu Yunchaokete
- Runner-up: (France) Térence Atmane
- Score: 6–3, 6–7^{(7–9)}, 6–4

Events
Singles	men	women
Doubles	men	women
← 2023 ·	Championnats de Granby	· 2025 →

Alexis Galarneau was the defending champion but lost in the first round to Bruno Kuzuhara.

Bu Yunchaokete won the title after defeating Térence Atmane 6–3, 6–7^{(7–9)}, 6–4 in the final.

== Seeds ==
1. (Australia) Adam Walton (first round, retired)
2. (France) Térence Atmane (final)
3. (France) Benjamin Bonzi (second round)
4. (Canada) Alexis Galarneau (first round)
5. (France) Hugo Grenier (semifinals)
6. (China) Bu Yunchaokete (champion)
7. (Japan) Yasutaka Uchiyama (semifinals)
8. (United States) Tristan Boyer (second round)

== Draw ==
=== Key ===
- Q = Qualifier
- WC = Wild card
- LL = Lucky loser
- Alt = Alternate
- ITF = ITF entry
- PR = Protected ranking
- SR = Special ranking
- SE = Special exempt
- JE = Junior exempt
- JR = Junior Accelerator Programme entrant
- CO = College Accelerator Programme entrant
- NG = Next Gen Accelerator Program entrant
- w/o = Walkover
- r = Retired
- d = Defaulted

=== Finals ===
Semifinals
5	(France) Hugo Grenier	2	1
6	(China) Bu Yunchaokete	6	6
7	(Japan) Yasutaka Uchiyama	3	6	4
2	(France) Térence Atmane	6	3	6

Final
6	(China) Bu Yunchaokete	6	6^{7}	6
2	(France) Térence Atmane	3	7^{9}	4

=== Top half ===
First round
1	(Australia) A Walton	6	2^{r}
Alt	(Ecuador) A Andrade	4	5
WC	(Canada) V Pospisil	4	4
WC	(Canada) J Boulais	6	6
(Argentina) JP Ficovich	6	6
Alt	(Jamaica) B Bicknell	1	3
(France) C Chidekh	3	6^{9}
5	(France) H Grenier	6	7^{11}
4	(Canada) A Galarneau	7	5	1
Q	(United States) B Kuzuhara	5	7	6
(Estonia) M Lajal	6	5	3
Q	(Japan) R Noguchi	3	7	6
Q	(Japan) K Uchida	3	7^{7}	1
(Australia) P Sekulic	6	6^{2}	6
(Mexico) R Pacheco Méndez	6^{6}	5
6	(China) Y Bu	7^{8}	7

Second round
Alt	(Ecuador) A Andrade	6	6
WC	(Canada) J Boulais	3	1
(Argentina) JP Ficovich	5	3
5	(France) H Grenier	7	6
Q	(United States) B Kuzuhara	6	6
Q	(Japan) R Noguchi	3	4
(Australia) P Sekulic	4	0
6	(China) Y Bu	6	6

Quarterfinals
Alt	(Ecuador) A Andrade	6^{3}	5
5	(France) H Grenier	7^{7}	7
Q	(United States) B Kuzuhara	6	4	2
6	(China) Y Bu	4	6	6

Semifinals
5	(France) H Grenier	2	1
6	(China) Y Bu	6	6

=== Bottom half ===
First round
7	(Japan) Y Uchiyama	4	7	6
(Canada) L Draxl	6	5	4
WC	(Canada) T Baadi	6	4	2
(Lebanon) H Habib	3	6	6
(Japan) S Shimabukuro	6	6
(France) A Géa	1	4
(United States) B Holt	3	6^{4}
3	(France) B Bonzi	6	7^{7}
8	(United States) T Boyer	6	4	7
(Japan) Y Shimizu	1	6	5
(Chinese Taipei) T-l Wu	7	7^{7}
Q	(Canada) C Harper	5	6^{2}
Q	(United States) S Kozlov	1	2
(Colombia) N Mejía	6	6
Q	(United States) Patrick Maloney	3	4
2	(France) T Atmane	6	6

Second round
7	(Japan) Y Uchiyama	6	3	6
(Lebanon) H Habib	2	6	3
(Japan) S Shimabukuro	7^{10}	7^{7}
3	(France) B Bonzi	6^{8}	6^{5}
8	(United States) T Boyer	4	7^{7}	2
(Chinese Taipei) T-l Wu	6	6^{5}	6
(Colombia) N Mejía	3	5
2	(France) T Atmane	6	7

Quarterfinals
7	(Japan) Y Uchiyama	5	6	7^{7}
(Japan) S Shimabukuro	7	4	6^{4}
(Chinese Taipei) T-l Wu	1	1
2	(France) T Atmane	6	6

Semifinals
7	(Japan) Y Uchiyama	3	6	4
2	(France) T Atmane	6	3	6
