= 2021 Tennis in the Land =

- Date: August 22–28
- Edition: 1st
- Category: WTA 250
- Draw: 32S / 16D
- Prize money: $236,000
- Surface: Hard / outdoor
- Location: Cleveland, United States
- Venue: Jacobs Pavilion

Champions

Singles
- (Estonia) Anett Kontaveit

Doubles
- (Japan) Shuko Aoyama / (Japan) Ena Shibahara
- Tennis in the Land

The 2021 Tennis in the Land event was a professional women's tennis tournament played on outdoor hard courts at Jacobs Pavilion. It was the first edition of the tournament held in the city of Cleveland in the United States and was a part of the WTA 250 category of the 2021 WTA Tour.

== Champions ==
=== Singles ===
- (Estonia) Anett Kontaveit def. (Romania) Irina-Camelia Begu, 7–6^{(7–5)}, 6–4.

This was Kontaveit's second WTA Tour title, and first since 2017.

=== Doubles ===
- (Japan) Shuko Aoyama / (Japan) Ena Shibahara def. (United States) Christina McHale / (India) Sania Mirza, 7–5, 6–3.

== Points and prize money ==
=== Point distribution ===
| Event | W | F | SF | QF | Round of 16 | Round of 32 | Q | Q2 | Q1 |
| Women's singles | 280 | 180 | 110 | 60 | 30 | 1 | 18 | 12 | 1 |
| Women's doubles | 280 | 180 | 110 | 60 | 1 | —N/a | —N/a | —N/a | —N/a |

=== Prize money ===
| Event | W | F | SF | QF | Round of 16 | Round of 32^{1} | Q2 | Q1 |
| Women's singles | $29,200 | $16,398 | $10,100 | $5,800 | $4,000 | $2,770 | $2,305 | $1,700 |
| Women's doubles* | $10,300 | $6,000 | $3,800 | $2,300 | $1,750 | —N/a | —N/a | —N/a |

_{^{1}Qualifiers prize money is also the Round of 32 prize money.}
_{*per team}

== Singles main-draw entrants ==
=== Seeds ===
| Country | Player | Rank^{1} | Seed |
|---|---|---|---|
| RUS | Daria Kasatkina | 26 | 1 |
| EST | Anett Kontaveit | 28 | 2 |
| RUS | Ekaterina Alexandrova | 34 | 3 |
| ~~GBR~~ | ~~Johanna Konta~~ | ~~36~~ | ~~4~~ |
| ARG | Nadia Podoroska | 37 | 5 |
| POL | Magda Linette | 43 | 6 |
| ESP | Sara Sorribes Tormo | 44 | 7 |
| USA | Shelby Rogers | 45 | 8 |
| CHN | Zhang Shuai | 50 | 9 |

- Rankings are as of August 16, 2021.

=== Other entrants ===
The following players received wildcards into the main draw:

- (Russia) Daria Kasatkina
- (United States) Maria Mateas
- (United States) Bethanie Mattek-Sands

The following players received entry from the qualifying draw:

- (United States) Emina Bektas
- (Norway) Ulrikke Eikeri
- (United States) Alexa Glatch
- (United States) Catherine Harrison

The following players received entry as lucky losers:

- (Czech Republic) Linda Fruhvirtová
- (Japan) Nagi Hanatani
- (United Kingdom) Tara Moore
- (Japan) Ena Shibahara

=== Withdrawals ===
Before the tournament

- (United States) Jennifer Brady → replaced by (Slovenia) Kaja Juvan
- (United Kingdom) Johanna Konta → replaced by (Czech Republic) Linda Fruhvirtová
- (United States) Jessica Pegula → replaced by (United States) Caty McNally
- (Australia) Storm Sanders → replaced by (United Kingdom) Tara Moore
- (United States) Alison Riske → replaced by (United States) Christina McHale
- (Netherlands) Arantxa Rus → replaced by (United States) Lauren Davis
- (Russia) Liudmila Samsonova → replaced by (Japan) Ena Shibahara
- (Switzerland) Jil Teichmann → replaced by (Japan) Nagi Hanatani
- (Romania) Patricia Maria Țig → replaced by (Russia) Vera Zvonareva
- (Russia) Elena Vesnina → replaced by (Belarus) Aliaksandra Sasnovich

During the tournament

- (Russia) Vera Zvonareva

=== Retirements ===
- (Russia) Anna Blinkova

== Doubles main-draw entrants ==
=== Seeds ===
| Country | Player | Country | Player | Rank^{1} | Seed |
|---|---|---|---|---|---|
| JPN | Shuko Aoyama | JPN | Ena Shibahara | 18 | 1 |
| CHI | Alexa Guarachi | USA | Desirae Krawczyk | 35 | 2 |
| CZE | Lucie Hradecká | CHN | Zhang Shuai | 79 | 3 |
| USA | Bethanie Mattek-Sands | USA | Shelby Rogers | 89 | 4 |

- Rankings are as of August 16, 2021.

=== Other entrants ===
The following pair received a wildcard into the doubles main draw:

- (United States) Maria Mateas / (Kazakhstan) Yaroslava Shvedova

The following pair received entry using a protected ranking:

- (Australia) Anastasia Rodionova / (Kazakhstan) Galina Voskoboeva

=== Withdrawals ===
Before the tournament

- (Slovenia) Kaja Juvan / (Kazakhstan) Galina Voskoboeva → replaced by (Australia) Anastasia Rodionova / (Kazakhstan) Galina Voskoboeva
