= 2023 Championnats Banque Nationale de Granby – Women's doubles =

Women's doubles
- 2023 Championnats Banque Nationale de Granby

Final
- Champions: (Mexico) Marcela Zacarías (Mexico) Renata Zarazúa
- Runners-up: (United States) Carmen Corley (United States) Ivana Corley
- Score: 6–3, 6–3

Events
Singles	men	women
Doubles	men	women
← 2022 ·	Championnats de Granby	· 2024 →

Marcela Zacarías and Renata Zarazúa won the women's doubles tournament at the 2023 Championnats Banque Nationale de Granby after defeating Carmen and Ivana Corley 6–3, 6–3 in the final.

Alicia Barnett and Olivia Nicholls were the defending champions but chose not to defend their title.

== Seeds ==
1. (United States) Makenna Jones / (United States) Jamie Loeb (quarterfinals, withdrew)
2. (Mexico) Marcela Zacarías / (Mexico) Renata Zarazúa (champions)
3. (Canada) Bianca Fernandez / (United States) Victoria Hu (first round)
4. (United States) Jaeda Daniel / (United States) Jessica Failla (quarterfinals)

== Draw ==
=== Key ===
- Q = Qualifier
- WC = Wild card
- LL = Lucky loser
- Alt = Alternate
- SE = Special exempt
- PR = Protected ranking
- ITF = ITF entry
- JE = Junior exempt
- w/o = Walkover
- r = Retired
- d = Defaulted
- SR = Special ranking

=== Finals ===
First round
1	(United States) M Jones (United States) J Loeb	6	6
WC	(Canada) N Lagaev (Canada) R Leroux	0	3
(United States) C Corley (United States) I Corley	6	6
(United States) A Markham (Slovakia) M Okáľová	0	3
4	(United States) J Daniel (United States) J Failla	7	6
WC	(Canada) S Nicholson (Canada) O Ogilvy	5	2
(Canada) S Fung (Canada) R Marino
(United States) K Pierre-Louis (Canada) L Sleeth	w/o
(Japan) K Okamura (Japan) H Sakatsume	6	6
N Kukharchuk (United States) S León	1	0
(United States) G Price (United States) K Scott	5	6	[10]
3	(Canada) B Fernandez (United States) V Hu	7	0	[8]
(Canada) L Kwong (United States) A Ulyashchenko	2	7	[7]
(Canada) K Cross (Canada) V Mboko	6	5	[10]
WC	(Canada) M Ostrzygalo (Canada) R Verma	2	1
2	(Mexico) M Zacarías (Mexico) R Zarazúa	6	6

Quarterfinals
1	(United States) M Jones (United States) J Loeb
(United States) C Corley (United States) I Corley	w/o
4	(United States) J Daniel (United States) J Failla	1	5
(United States) K Pierre-Louis (Canada) L Sleeth	6	7
(Japan) K Okamura (Japan) H Sakatsume	6	6
(United States) G Price (United States) K Scott	3	3
(Canada) K Cross (Canada) V Mboko	6	0	[8]
2	(Mexico) M Zacarías (Mexico) R Zarazúa	3	6	[10]

Semifinals
(United States) C Corley (United States) I Corley	6	5	[10]
(United States) K Pierre-Louis (Canada) L Sleeth	3	7	[6]
(Japan) K Okamura (Japan) H Sakatsume	1	4
2	(Mexico) M Zacarías (Mexico) R Zarazúa	6	6

Final
(United States) C Corley (United States) I Corley	3	3
2	(Mexico) M Zacarías (Mexico) R Zarazúa	6	6
