= 2024 Tennis in the Land – Singles =

Singles
- 2024 Tennis in the Land

Final
- Champion: (United States) McCartney Kessler
- Runner-up: (Brazil) Beatriz Haddad Maia
- Score: 1–6, 6–1, 7–5

Details
- Draw: 32 (4Q / 3WC)
- Seeds: 8

Events
| Singles | Doubles |
| ← 2023 · | Tennis in the Land | · 2025 → |

McCartney Kessler won her first WTA Tour singles title at the 2024 Tennis in the Land, defeating Beatriz Haddad Maia in the final, 1–6, 6–1, 7–5. Kessler became the first wildcard to win the tournament.

Sara Sorribes Tormo was the defending champion, but lost in the second round to Peyton Stearns.

== Seeds ==
1. (Brazil) Beatriz Haddad Maia (final)
2. (Canada) Leylah Fernandez (first round)
3. (Czech Republic) Kateřina Siniaková (semifinals)
4. (China) Wang Xinyu (second round)
5. Anastasia Potapova (semifinals)
6. (United States) Peyton Stearns (quarterfinals)
7. (Bulgaria) Viktoriya Tomova (second round)
8. (United States) Sofia Kenin (second round)

== Draw ==
=== Key ===
- Q = Qualifier
- WC = Wild card
- LL = Lucky loser
- Alt = Alternate
- ITF = ITF entry
- PR = Protected ranking
- SR = Special ranking
- SE = Special exempt
- JE = Junior exempt
- JR = Junior Accelerator Programme entrant
- CO = College Accelerator Programme entrant
- NG = Next Gen Accelerator Program entrant
- w/o = Walkover
- r = Retired
- d = Defaulted

=== Finals ===
Semifinals
1 | (Brazil) Beatriz Haddad Maia | 6 | 2 | 6
3 | (Czech Republic) Kateřina Siniaková | 3 | 6 | 2
WC | (United States) McCartney Kessler | 4 | 6 | 6
5 | Anastasia Potapova | 6 | 3 | 3

Final
1 | (Brazil) Beatriz Haddad Maia | 6 | 1 | 5
WC | (United States) McCartney Kessler | 1 | 6 | 7

=== Top half ===
First round
1 | (Brazil) B Haddad Maia | 6 | 7
Q | (Switzerland) V Golubic | 3 | 5
(Spain) C Bucșa | 6 | 6
(Italy) M Trevisan | 2 | 4
(France) C Burel | 6 | 6
LL | (United States) E Kalieva | 3 | 2
(United States) K Volynets | 2 | 6 | 5
8 | (United States) S Kenin | 6 | 2 | 7
3 | (Czech Republic) K Siniaková | 6^{5} | 6 | 7^{7}
Q | (Japan) S Ishii | 7^{7} | 3 | 6^{5}
Q | (Spain) J Bouzas Maneiro | 4 | 6 | 6
(France) V Gracheva | 6 | 3 | 2
(Spain) S Sorribes Tormo | 6 | 6
(China) Y Wang | 4 | 1
(Japan) M Uchijima | 0 | 6 | 1
6 | (United States) P Stearns | 6 | 1 | 6

Second round
1 | (Brazil) B Haddad Maia | 6 | 6
(Spain) C Bucșa | 2 | 1
(France) C Burel | 6 | 6
8 | (United States) S Kenin | 4 | 3
3 | (Czech Republic) K Siniaková | 2 | 6 | 7^{7}
Q | (Spain) J Bouzas Maneiro | 6 | 4 | 6^{2}
(Spain) S Sorribes Tormo | 3 | 2
6 | (United States) P Stearns | 6 | 6

Quarterfinals
1 | (Brazil) B Haddad Maia | 6 | 6
(France) C Burel | 2 | 2
3 | (Czech Republic) K Siniaková | 1 | 6 | 6
6 | (United States) P Stearns | 6 | 3 | 4

Semifinals
1 | (Brazil) B Haddad Maia | 6 | 2 | 6
3 | (Czech Republic) K Siniaková | 3 | 6 | 2

=== Bottom half ===
First round
7 | (Bulgaria) V Tomova | 6 | 6
WC | (United States) L Davis | 1 | 4
(Netherlands) A Rus | 6 | 7^{7}
(Italy) L Bronzetti | 3 | 6^{4}
WC | (United States) K Scott | 1 | 6 | 4
WC | (United States) M Kessler | 6 | 4 | 6
A Blinkova | 1 | 1
4 | (China) Xin Wang | 6 | 6
5 | A Potapova | 6 | 6
(France) D Parry | 3 | 2
(Slovakia) AK Schmiedlová | 6 | 3 | 2
(Denmark) C Tauson | 3 | 6 | 6
LL | (Belgium) G Minnen | 6 | 7^{7}
(Romania) J Cristian | 3 | 6^{5}
Q | (Romania) A Bogdan | 1 | 7^{7} | 6
2 | (Canada) L Fernandez | 6 | 6^{2} | 2

Second round
7 | (Bulgaria) V Tomova | 3 | 3
(Netherlands) A Rus | 6 | 6
WC | (United States) M Kessler | 3 | 6 | 6
4 | (China) Xin Wang | 6 | 4 | 2
5 | A Potapova | 6 | 6
(Denmark) C Tauson | 2 | 2
LL | (Belgium) G Minnen | 6^{3} | 3
Q | (Romania) A Bogdan | 7^{7} | 6

Quarterfinals
(Netherlands) A Rus | 4 | 2
WC | (United States) M Kessler | 6 | 6
5 | A Potapova | 6 | 6
Q | (Romania) A Bogdan | 2 | 1

Semifinals
WC | (United States) M Kessler | 4 | 6 | 6
5 | A Potapova | 6 | 3 | 3

== Qualifying ==
=== Seeds ===
1. (Belgium) Greet Minnen (qualifying competition, lucky loser)
2. (Switzerland) Viktorija Golubic (qualified)
3. (Spain) Jéssica Bouzas Maneiro (qualified)
4. (Hungary) Anna Bondár (first round)
5. (Romania) Ana Bogdan (qualified)
6. (Germany) Tamara Korpatsch (first round)
7. (Australia) Taylah Preston (first round)
8. (Japan) Sayaka Ishii (qualified)

=== Qualifiers ===
1. (Romania) Ana Bogdan
2. (Switzerland) Viktorija Golubic
3. (Spain) Jéssica Bouzas Maneiro
4. (Japan) Sayaka Ishii

=== Lucky losers ===
1. (Belgium) Greet Minnen
2. (United States) Elvina Kalieva

=== Qualifying draw ===
==== First qualifier ====
First round
1 | (Belgium) Greet Minnen | 6 | 7^{8}
(United States) Hina Inoue | 1 | 6^{6}
WC | (United States) Shelby Rogers | 6^{4} | 6 | 1
5 | (Romania) Ana Bogdan | 7^{7} | 4 | 6

Qualifying competition
1 | (Belgium) Greet Minnen | 3 | 3
5 | (Romania) Ana Bogdan | 6 | 6

==== Second qualifier ====
First round
2 | (Switzerland) Viktorija Golubic | 7 | 7^{7}
(United Kingdom) Emily Appleton | 5 | 6^{5}
WC | (United States) Anna Frey | 6 | 6
6 | (Germany) Tamara Korpatsch | 4 | 4

Qualifying competition
2 | (Switzerland) Viktorija Golubic | 6 | 6
WC | (United States) Anna Frey | 2 | 3

==== Third qualifier ====
First round
3 | (Spain) Jéssica Bouzas Maneiro | 6 | 6
(India) Sahaja Yamalapalli | 2 | 1
(Hong Kong) Eudice Chong | 6 | 6
7 | (Australia) Taylah Preston | 2 | 1

Qualifying competition
3 | (Spain) Jéssica Bouzas Maneiro | 6 | 6
(Hong Kong) Eudice Chong | 2 | 1

==== Fourth qualifier ====
First round
4 | (Hungary) Anna Bondár | 4 | 4
(United States) Elvina Kalieva | 6 | 6
PR | (China) Zheng Saisai | 3 | 4
8 | (Japan) Sayaka Ishii | 6 | 6

Qualifying competition
(United States) Elvina Kalieva | 5 | 1
8 | (Japan) Sayaka Ishii | 7 | 6
