= 2025 Championnats Banque Nationale de Granby – Men's doubles =

Men's doubles
- 2025 Championnats Banque Nationale de Granby

Final
- Champions: (New Zealand) Finn Reynolds (New Zealand) James Watt
- Runners-up: (Australia) Kody Pearson (Japan) Yuta Shimizu
- Score: 6–3, 6–4

Events
Singles	men	women
Doubles	men	women
- Championnats de Granby

Andrés Andrade and Mac Kiger were the defending champions but lost in the quarterfinals to Hsu Yu-hsiou and Huang Tsung-hao.

Finn Reynolds and James Watt won the title after defeating Kody Pearson and Yuta Shimizu 6–3, 6–4 in the final.

== Seeds ==
1. (New Zealand) Finn Reynolds / (New Zealand) James Watt (champions)
2. (Canada) Liam Draxl / (United States) Tyler Zink (quarterfinals, withdrew)
3. (Ecuador) Andrés Andrade / (United States) Mac Kiger (quarterfinals)
4. (Australia) Kody Pearson / (Japan) Yuta Shimizu (final)

== Draw ==
Key

- Q = Qualifier
- WC = Wild card
- LL = Lucky loser
- Alt = Alternate
- ITF = ITF entry
- PR = Protected ranking
- SR = Special ranking
- SE = Special exempt
- JE = Junior exempt
- JR = Junior Accelerator Programme entrant
- CO = College Accelerator Programme entrant
- NG = Next Gen Accelerator Program entrant
- w/o = Walkover
- r = Retired
- d = Defaulted

=== Draw ===
First round
1	(New Zealand) F Reynolds (New Zealand) J Watt	7	6
(Australia) O Jasika (Canada) K Stevenson	5	4
(Japan) M Imamura (Japan) R Noguchi	6	7
(Japan) Kosuke Ogura (Japan) Keisuke Saitoh	3	5
3	(Ecuador) A Andrade (United States) M Kiger	6	4	[10]
WC	(Canada) Keegan Rice (Canada) Alexander Rozin	3	6	[7]
(Chinese Taipei) Y-h Hsu (Chinese Taipei) T-h Huang	6	7^{7}
Alt	(Canada) J Boulais (United States) A Martin	2	6^{4}
(United States) P Kumar (United States) J Sheehy	6	3	[10]
(United States) Andre Ilagan (Japan) H Moriya	3	6	[4]
WC	(Canada) Mikael Arseneault (Canada) N Arseneault	3	2
4	(Australia) K Pearson (Japan) Y Shimizu	6	6
(Costa Rica) J Flores (South Africa) Kris van Wyk	6	6
(Japan) Ryuki Matsuda (Japan) N Tajima	1	2
(Antigua and Barbuda) J Maginley (United States) A Perez	6^{1}	7^{11}	[8]
2	(Canada) L Draxl (United States) T Zink	7^{7}	6^{9}	[10]

Quarterfinals
1	(New Zealand) F Reynolds (New Zealand) J Watt	6	3	[10]
(Japan) M Imamura (Japan) R Noguchi	3	6	[6]
3	(Ecuador) A Andrade (United States) M Kiger	3	6	[8]
(Chinese Taipei) Y-h Hsu (Chinese Taipei) T-h Huang	6	3	[10]
(United States) P Kumar (United States) J Sheehy	5	2
4	(Australia) K Pearson (Japan) Y Shimizu	7	6
(Costa Rica) J Flores (South Africa) K van Wyk	w/o
2	(Canada) L Draxl (United States) T Zink

Semifinals
1	(New Zealand) F Reynolds (New Zealand) J Watt	6	7
(Chinese Taipei) Y-h Hsu (Chinese Taipei) T-h Huang	4	5
4	(Australia) K Pearson (Japan) Y Shimizu	4	7	[10]
(Costa Rica) J Flores (South Africa) K van Wyk	6	5	[2]

Final
1	(New Zealand) F Reynolds (New Zealand) J Watt	6	6
4	(Australia) K Pearson (Japan) Y Shimizu	3	4
