= 2025 Tennis in the Land =

- Date: August 17–23
- Edition: 5th
- Category: WTA 250
- Draw: 32S / 16D
- Prize money: $275,094
- Surface: Hard / outdoor
- Location: Cleveland, United States
- Venue: Jacobs Pavilion

Champions

Singles
- (Romania) Sorana Cîrstea

Doubles
- (Kazakhstan) Anna Danilina / (Serbia) Aleksandra Krunić
← 2024 ·	Tennis in the Land	· 2026 →

The 2025 Tennis in the Land event, sponsored by Rocket Mortgage, was a professional women's tennis tournament played on outdoor hard courts at the Nautica Entertainment Complex in The Flats in Cleveland, Ohio. It was the fifth edition of the tournament and part of the WTA 250 category of the 2025 WTA Tour. The tournament took place from August 17–23, 2025.

== Champions ==
=== Singles ===
- (Romania) Sorana Cîrstea def. (United States) Ann Li, 6–2, 6–4

=== Doubles ===
- (Kazakhstan) Anna Danilina / (Serbia) Aleksandra Krunić def. (Chinese Taipei) Chan Hao-ching / (China) Jiang Xinyu, 7–6^{(7–3)}, 6–4

== Singles main-draw entrants ==
=== Seeds ===
Country	Player	Rank^{1}	Seed
	Liudmila Samsonova	18	1
CHN	Wang Xinyu	37	2
AUS	Maya Joint	44	3
	Anastasia Potapova	45	4
FRA	Loïs Boisson	47	5
GBR	Sonay Kartal	48	6
GBR	Katie Boulter	50	7
USA	Hailey Baptiste	51	8

- Rankings are as of August 11, 2025.

=== Other entrants ===
The following players received wildcards into the main draw:

- (United Kingdom) Katie Boulter
- (United States) Katrina Scott

The following player received entry using a protected ranking:

- (China) Zhu Lin

The following players received entry from the qualifying draw:

- (Romania) Sorana Cîrstea
- (Australia) Talia Gibson
- (France) Elsa Jacquemot
- (China) Wang Yafan

=== Withdrawals ===
- (Armenia) Elina Avanesyan → replaced by (Ukraine) Yuliia Starodubtseva
- (Latvia) Anastasija Sevastova → replaced by (Switzerland) Jil Teichmann
- (Germany) Laura Siegemund → replaced by (Australia) Kimberly Birrell
- (Denmark) Clara Tauson → replaced by (Italy) Lucia Bronzetti
- (Ukraine) Dayana Yastremska → replaced by (Japan) Moyuka Uchijima

== Doubles main-draw entrants ==
=== Seeds ===
Country	Player	Country	Player	Rank^{1}	Seed
KAZ	Anna Danilina	SRB	Aleksandra Krunić	45	1
TPE	Chan Hao-ching	CHN	Jiang Xinyu	50	2
NOR	Ulrikke Eikeri	JPN	Eri Hozumi	70	3
HUN	Fanny Stollár	TPE	Wu Fang-hsien	76	4

- Rankings are as of August 11, 2025.

=== Other entrants ===
The following pairs received wildcards into the doubles main draw:

- (United States) Anna Bennett / (United States) Anna Frey
- (United States) Ella Franz / (Spain) Laura Tapia González
