= 2025 Championnats Banque Nationale de Granby =

- Date: 14–20 July
- Edition: 30th (men); 13th (women)
- Category: ATP Challenger Tour; ITF Women's World Tennis Tour
- Surface: Hard / Outdoor
- Location: Granby, Canada

Champions

Men's singles
- (Denmark) August Holmgren

Women's singles
- (Australia) Talia Gibson

Men's doubles
- (New Zealand) Finn Reynolds / (New Zealand) James Watt

Women's doubles
- (Canada) Alexandra Vagramov / (Czech Republic) Darja Viďmanová
- Championnats de Granby

The 2025 Championnats Banque Nationale de Granby was a professional tennis tournament played on outdoor hard courts. It was the 30th (men) and 13th (women) editions of the tournament, which were part of the 2025 ATP Challenger Tour and the 2025 ITF Women's World Tennis Tour. It took place in Granby, Quebec, between 14 and 20 July 2025.

== Champions ==
=== Men's singles ===
- (Denmark) August Holmgren def. (Canada) Liam Draxl 6–3, 6–3.

=== Women's singles ===
- (Australia) Talia Gibson def. (United States) Fiona Crawley 6–3, 6–4.

=== Men's doubles ===
- (New Zealand) Finn Reynolds / (New Zealand) James Watt def. (Australia) Kody Pearson / (Japan) Yuta Shimizu 6–3, 6–4.

=== Women's doubles ===
- (Canada) Alexandra Vagramov / (Czech Republic) Darja Viďmanová def. (Japan) Saki Imamura / (Japan) Wakana Sonobe 7–6^{(7–5)}, 6–3.

== Men's singles main-draw entrants ==
=== Seeds ===
Country	Player	Rank^{1}	Seed
USA	Eliot Spizzirri	128	1
BEL	Alexander Blockx	141	2
CAN	Liam Draxl	147	3
JPN	Yosuke Watanuki	177	4
JPN	Sho Shimabukuro	186	5
DEN	August Holmgren	192	6
JPN	James Trotter	198	7
AUS	Omar Jasika	202	8

- ^{1} Rankings are as of June 30, 2025.

=== Other entrants ===
The following players received wildcards into the singles main draw:

- (Canada) Juan Carlos Aguilar
- (Canada) Nicolas Arseneault
- (Canada) Justin Boulais

The following player received entry into the singles main draw using a protected ranking:

- (Australia) Philip Sekulic

The following players received entry into the singles main draw as alternates:

- (Japan) Naoki Nakagawa
- (United States) Tyler Zink

The following players received entry from the qualifying draw:

- (United States) Patrick Maloney
- (United States) Andres Martin
- (United States) Alfredo Perez
- (Canada) Alexander Rozin
- (South Africa) Kris van Wyk
- (New Zealand) James Watt
