= Tennis in the Land =

Defunct tennis tournament
- Founded: 2021
- Abolished: 2025
- Location: Cleveland, Ohio; United States
- Venue: Jacobs Pavilion
- Category: WTA 250
- Surface: Hard / Outdoor
- Draw: 32S/16Q/16D
- Prize money: $275,094
- Website: Official website

Current champions (2025)
- Singles: (Romania) Sorana Cîrstea
- Doubles: (Kazakhstan) Anna Danilina (Serbia) Aleksandra Krunić

Tennis in the Land was a tennis tournament on the WTA Tour, held at the Nautica Entertainment Complex in Cleveland, Ohio, United States. A WTA 250 tournament, it was held one week prior to the US Open as the final women's event of the US Open Series.

The tournament was first played in 2021 at a spot on the WTA schedule that had formerly been occupied by the Connecticut Open, which was discontinued after the 2019 event.

== Past finals ==
=== Singles ===
Year	Champion	Runner-up	Score
2021	(Estonia) Anett Kontaveit	(Romania) Irina-Camelia Begu	7–6^{(7–5)}, 6–4
2022	Liudmila Samsonova	Aliaksandra Sasnovich	6–1, 6–3
2023	(Spain) Sara Sorribes Tormo	Ekaterina Alexandrova	3–6, 6–4, 6–4
2024	(United States) McCartney Kessler	(Brazil) Beatriz Haddad Maia	1–6, 6–1, 7–5
2025	(Romania) Sorana Cîrstea	(United States) Ann Li	6–2, 6–4

=== Doubles ===
Year	Champions	Runners-up	Score
2021	(Japan) Shuko Aoyama (Japan) Ena Shibahara	(United States) Christina McHale (India) Sania Mirza	7–5, 6–3
2022	(United States) Nicole Melichar-Martinez (Australia) Ellen Perez	(Kazakhstan) Anna Danilina (Serbia) Aleksandra Krunić	7–5, 6–3
2023	(Japan) Miyu Kato (Indonesia) Aldila Sutjiadi	(United States) Nicole Melichar-Martinez (Australia) Ellen Perez	6–4, 6–7^{(4–7)}, [10–8]
2024	(Spain) Cristina Bucșa (China) Xu Yifan	(Japan) Shuko Aoyama (Japan) Eri Hozumi	3–6, 6–3, [10–6]
2025	(Kazakhstan) Anna Danilina (Serbia) Aleksandra Krunić	(Chinese Taipei) Chan Hao-ching (China) Jiang Xinyu	7–6^{(7–3)}, 6–4

== See also ==
- Cleveland Open
- Winston-Salem Open
