= Nagi Hanatani =

Japanese tennis player (born 1995)

- Country (sports): Japan
- Born: 7 March 1995 (age 31)
- Plays: Right-handed (two-handed backhand)
- Prize money: $128,290

Singles
- Career record: 240–303
- Career titles: 0
- Highest ranking: No. 356 (10 August 2020)
- Current ranking: No. 706 (29 July 2024)

Doubles
- Career record: 92–165
- Career titles: 2 ITF
- Highest ranking: No. 369 (28 January 2019)
- Current ranking: No. 712 (29 July 2024)
- Last updated on: 30 July 2024.

Nagi Hanatani (華谷和生, Hanatani Nagi; born 7 March 1995) is a Japanese tennis player.

Hanatani has a career-high WTA singles ranking of 356, achieved on 10 August 2020. She also has a career-high WTA doubles ranking of 369, reached on 28 January 2019.

Hanatani made her WTA Tour debut at the 2021 Tennis in the Land, after entering the singles main draw as a lucky loser. She reached the second round, after Anna Blinkova retired after just one game, but lost her second-round match against Kateřina Siniaková without winning a game.

== ITF Circuit finals ==
=== Singles: 1 (runner-up) ===
| Legend W25 tournaments | Finals by surface Hard (0–1) |

| Result | W–L | Date | Tournament | Tier | Surface | Opponent | Score |
|---|---|---|---|---|---|---|---|
| Loss | 0–1 | Oct 2019 | ITF Makinohara, Japan | W25 | Hard | (Spain) Paula Badosa | 5–7, 1–6 |

=== Doubles: 4 (2 titles, 2 runner-ups) ===
| Legend W50 tournaments W10 tournaments | Finals by surface Hard (2–2) |

| Result | W–L | Date | Tournament | Tier | Surface | Partner | Opponents | Score |
|---|---|---|---|---|---|---|---|---|
| Win | 1–0 | Mar 2014 | ITF Kofu, Japan | W10 | Hard | (Japan) Hikari Yamamoto | (Japan) Riko Fujioka (Japan) Hayaka Murase | 3–6, 6–2, [10–7] |
| Win | 2–0 | Jul 2016 | ITF Hong Kong, China | W10 | Hard | (Australia) Alana Parnaby | (China) Gai Ao (China) Zhang Ying | 6–4, 4–6, [13–11] |
| Loss | 2–1 | Apr 2024 | Lopota Open, Georgia | W50 | Hard | (Poland) Urszula Radwańska | (Slovakia) Viktória Hrunčáková (Czech Republic) Tereza Valentová | 2–6, 1–6 |
| Loss | 2–2 | Oct 2026 | ITF Singapore | W15 | Hard | (China) Lu Jingjing | (South Korea) Kim Yu-jin (Chinese Taipei) Lin Fang-an | 1–6, 1–6 |
