= 2008 Fifth Third Bank Tennis Championships =

- Date: July 21 – July 27
- Edition: 14th
- Location: Lexington, Kentucky, United States

Champions

Men's singles
- (India) Somdev Devvarman

Women's singles
- (United States) Melanie Oudin

Men's doubles
- (Italy) Alessandro da Col / (Italy) Andrea Stoppini

Women's doubles
- (Chinese Taipei) Chan Chin-wei / (United States) Kimberly Couts
- Fifth Third Bank Tennis Championships

The 2008 Fifth Third Bank Tennis Championships was a professional tennis tournament played on Hard court. It was a fourteenth edition of the tournament which was part of the 2008 ATP Challenger Series. It took place in Lexington, Kentucky, United States between 21 and 27 July 2008.

== Singles entrants ==
=== Seeds ===
Nationality	Player	Ranking*	Seeding
ISR	Dudi Sela	78	1
USA	Bobby Reynolds	90	2
USA	Robert Kendrick	123	3
DEN	Kristian Pless	128	4
USA	Amer Delić	144	5
ISR	Harel Levy	157	6
USA	Brendan Evans	174	7
USA	Kevin Kim	182	8

- Rankings are as of July 14, 2008.

=== Other entrants ===
The following players received wildcards into the singles main draw:

- (United States) Chase Buchanan
- (United States) Amer Delić
- (United States) Bryan Koniecko
- (United States) Rhyne Williams

The following players received entry from the qualifying draw:

- (India) Somdev Devvarman
- (United States) Alberto Francis
- (United States) Justin O'Neal
- (United States) Rylan Rizza

The following players received entry by special exempt:

- (Canada) Érik Chvojka
- (Japan) Toshihide Matsui

== Champions ==
=== Men's singles ===
- (India) Somdev Devvarman def. (United States) Robert Kendrick 6–3, 6–3

=== Women's singles ===
- (United States) Melanie Oudin def. (United States) Carly Gullickson 6–4, 6–2

=== Men's doubles ===
- (Italy) Alessandro da Col / (Italy) Andrea Stoppini def. (France) Olivier Charroin / (Canada) Érik Chvojka 6–2, 2–6, [10–8]

=== Women's doubles ===
- (Chinese Taipei) Chan Chin-wei / (United States) Kimberly Couts def. (United States) Lindsay Lee-Waters / (United States) Melanie Oudin 2–6, 6–3, [10–8]
