= 2013 Challenger Banque Nationale de Granby =

- Date: July 15 – July 21
- Edition: 20th (men); 3rd (women)
- Category: ATP Challenger Tour; ITF Women's Circuit
- Prize money: US$50,000+H (men); US$25,000 (women)
- Surface: Hard – outdoors
- Location: Granby, Quebec, Canada
- Venue: Club de tennis des Loisirs de Granby

Champions

Men's singles
- (Canada) Frank Dancevic

Women's singles
- (Japan) Risa Ozaki

Men's doubles
- (Canada) Érik Chvojka / (Canada) Peter Polansky

Women's doubles
- (United States) Lena Litvak / (Canada) Carol Zhao
← 2012 ·	Challenger de Granby	· 2014 →

The 2013 Challenger Banque Nationale de Granby was a professional tennis tournament played on outdoor hard courts. It was the 20th edition, for men, and 3rd edition, for women, of the tournament and part of the 2013 ATP Challenger Tour and the 2013 ITF Women's Circuit, offering totals of $50,000, for men, and $25,000, for women, in prize money. It took place in Granby, Quebec, Canada between July 15 and July 21, 2013.

== Men's singles main-draw entrants ==
=== Seeds ===
Country	Player	Rank^{1}	Seed
SVK	Lukáš Lacko	100	1
FRA	Nicolas Mahut	127	2
JPN	Tatsuma Ito	174	3
BEL	Maxime Authom	180	4
AUS	Matt Reid	187	5
CAN	Frank Dancevic	195	6
JPN	Hiroki Moriya	199	7
CAN	Steven Diez	211	8

- ^{1} Rankings are as of July 8, 2013

=== Other entrants ===
The following players received wildcards into the singles main draw:

- (Canada) Philip Bester
- (Canada) Hugo Di Feo
- (Canada) Filip Peliwo
- (Canada) Brayden Schnur

The following players received entry from the qualifying draw:

- (United States) Tyler Hochwalt
- (Canada) Pavel Krainik
- (Australia) Blake Mott
- (Canada) Milan Pokrajac

== Champions ==
=== Men's singles ===
- (Canada) Frank Dancevic def. (Slovakia) Lukáš Lacko, 6–4, 6–7^{(4–7)}, 6–3

=== Women's singles ===
- (Japan) Risa Ozaki def. (United Kingdom) Samantha Murray, 0–6, 7–5, 6–2

=== Men's doubles ===
- (Canada) Érik Chvojka / (Canada) Peter Polansky def. (United States) Adam El Mihdawy / (Croatia) Ante Pavić, 6–4, 6–3

=== Women's doubles ===
- (United States) Lena Litvak / (Canada) Carol Zhao def. (France) Julie Coin / (United Kingdom) Emily Webley-Smith, 7–5, 6–4
