= 2009 Fifth Third Bank Tennis Championships – Women's singles =

Women's singles
- 2009 Fifth Third Bank Tennis Championships

Final
- Champion: (India) Sania Mirza
- Runner-up: (France) Julie Coin
- Score: 7–6^{(7–5)}, 6–4

Events
Singles	men	women
Doubles	men	women
← 2008 ·	Fifth Third Bank Tennis Championships	· 2010 →

This was the 13th edition of the tournament, which was part of the 2009 ITF Women's Circuit, a tier below the 2009 WTA Tour. It was held in Lexington, Kentucky, United States from 20 to 26 July 2009 on outdoor hardcourts. The prize money for women was US$50,000.

Melanie Oudin, the defending champion, declined to participate that year.

Sania Mirza won in the final, defeating top seed Julie Coin 7–6(5), 6–4.

== Seeds ==
1. (France) Julie Coin (final)
2. (India) Sania Mirza (champion)
3. (United Kingdom) Melanie South (first round)
4. (United States) Madison Brengle (quarterfinals)
5. (Canada) Valérie Tétreault (second round)
6. (China) Yuan Meng (semifinals)
7. (France) Yulia Fedossova (second round)
8. (Japan) Aiko Nakamura (first round)

== Draw ==
Key

- Q = Qualifier
- WC = Wild card
- LL = Lucky loser
- Alt = Alternate
- ITF = ITF entry
- PR = Protected ranking
- SR = Special ranking
- SE = Special exempt
- JE = Junior exempt
- JR = Junior Accelerator Programme entrant
- CO = College Accelerator Programme entrant
- NG = Next Gen Accelerator Program entrant
- w/o = Walkover
- r = Retired
- d = Defaulted

=== Finals ===
Semifinals
1	(France) Julie Coin	6	6
(Chinese Taipei) Chang Kai-chen	2	4
6	(China) Yuan Meng	1	6	4
2	(India) Sania Mirza	6	4	6

Final
1	(France) Julie Coin	6^{5}	4
2	(India) Sania Mirza	7^{7}	6

=== Top half ===
First round
1	(France) J Coin	3	6	7
WC	(United States) M Cecil	6	4	5
(Slovenia) P Rampre	2	2
(United States) K Couts	6	6
(United States) A Rolle	6	6
Q	(United States) M Broderick	1	4
(United States) L Litvak	2	2
7	(France) Y Fedossova	6	6
3	(United Kingdom) M South	4	5
WC	(United States) A Riske	6	7
(Russia) E Afinogenova	0	0	r
(Chinese Taipei) K-c Chang	6	1
(Japan) R Fuda	6	6
Q	(United States) H Barte	4	0
(United States) L Osterloh	6	6
8	(Japan) A Nakamura	4	4

Second round
1	(France) J Coin	6	6
(United States) K Couts	1	2
(United States) A Rolle	7^{8}	7^{9}
7	(France) Y Fedossova	6^{6}	6^{7}
WC	(United States) A Riske	2	6	2
(Chinese Taipei) K-c Chang	6	4	6
(Japan) R Fuda	3	3
(United States) L Osterloh	6	6

Quarterfinals
1	(France) J Coin	7^{7}	6
(United States) A Rolle	6^{4}	2
(Chinese Taipei) K-c Chang	6	4	6
(United States) L Osterloh	2	6	3

Semifinals
1	(France) J Coin	6	6
(Chinese Taipei) K-c Chang	2	4

=== Bottom half ===
First round
6	(China) M Yuan	6	6
Q	(Brazil) MF Alves	1	0
WC	(United States) K Ruckert	3	6	1
(United States) G Brodsky	6	2	6
(Japan) E Sema	4	6	6
Q	(United States) A Fink	6	2	0
(United States) A Cohen	5	6	2
4	(United States) M Brengle	7	3	6
5	(Canada) V Tétreault	6	6
(Israel) J Glushko	0	4
(Canada) R Marino	4	4
(United States) L Lee-Waters	6	6
(Ukraine) T Luzhanska	6	6
WC	(United States) A Will	1	2
(Bolivia) MF Álvarez Terán	4	3
2	(India) S Mirza	6	6

Second round
6	(China) M Yuan	1	7	7^{7}
(United States) G Brodsky	6	5	6^{3}
(Japan) E Sema	3	3
4	(United States) M Brengle	6	6
5	(Canada) V Tétreault	4	3
(United States) L Lee-Waters	6	6
(Ukraine) T Luzhanska	4	6^{3}
2	(India) S Mirza	6	7^{7}

Quarterfinals
6	(China) M Yuan	6	6
4	(United States) M Brengle	3	3
(United States) L Lee-Waters	2	r
2	(India) S Mirza	5

Semifinals
6	(China) M Yuan	1	6	4
2	(India) S Mirza	6	4	6
