= 2013 Challenger Banque Nationale de Granby – Men's singles =

Men's singles
- 2013 Challenger Banque Nationale de Granby

Final
- Champion: (Canada) Frank Dancevic
- Runner-up: (Slovakia) Lukáš Lacko
- Score: 6–4, 6–7^{(4–7)}, 6–3

Events
Singles	men	women
Doubles	men	women
- Challenger de Granby

Vasek Pospisil was the defending champion but chose to compete at the 2013 Claro Open Colombia.

Frank Dancevic defeated first seed Lukáš Lacko 6–4, 6–7^{(4–7)}, 6–3 in the final.

== Seeds ==
1. (Slovakia) Lukáš Lacko (final)
2. (France) Nicolas Mahut (second round)
3. (Japan) Tatsuma Ito (quarterfinals)
4. (Belgium) Maxime Authom (first round)
5. (Australia) Matt Reid (second round)
6. (Canada) Frank Dancevic (champion)
7. (Japan) Hiroki Moriya (semifinals)
8. (Canada) Steven Diez (first round)

== Draw ==
Key

- Q = Qualifier
- WC = Wild card
- LL = Lucky loser
- Alt = Alternate
- ITF = ITF entry
- PR = Protected ranking
- SR = Special ranking
- SE = Special exempt
- JE = Junior exempt
- JR = Junior Accelerator Programme entrant
- CO = College Accelerator Programme entrant
- NG = Next Gen Accelerator Program entrant
- w/o = Walkover
- r = Retired
- d = Defaulted

=== Finals ===
Semifinals
1	(Slovakia) Lukáš Lacko	6	6
7	(Japan) Hiroki Moriya	3	3
6	(Canada) Frank Dancevic	6	7
WC	(Canada) Philip Bester	4	5

Final
1	(Slovakia) Lukáš Lacko	4	7^{7}	3
6	(Canada) Frank Dancevic	6	6^{4}	6

=== Top half ===
First round
1	(Slovakia) L Lacko	6	6
WC	(Canada) Hugo Di Feo	1	2
(Croatia) T Androić	4	4
(Switzerland) A Bossel	6	6
(Canada) É Chvojka	3	6	2
(United Kingdom) J Ward	6	3	6
(Australia) M Barton	6	5	1
5	(Australia) M Reid	3	7	6
3	(Japan) T Ito	7^{7}	6
Q	(Australia) B Mott	6^{3}	3
(Croatia) A Pavić	2	5
(Japan) H Kondo	6	7
(Australia) L Saville	6^{7}	6	1
(France) C Reix	7	2	6
WC	(Canada) B Schnur	6^{4}	5
7	(Japan) H Moriya	7^{7}	7

Second round
1	(Slovakia) L Lacko	6	6
(Switzerland) A Bossel	1	2
(United Kingdom) J Ward	6	6
5	(Australia) M Reid	3	4
3	(Japan) T Ito	6	7^{7}
(Japan) H Kondo	3	6^{2}
(France) C Reix	0	5
7	(Japan) H Moriya	6	7

Quarterfinals
1	(Slovakia) L Lacko	6	6
(United Kingdom) J Ward	3	2
3	(Japan) T Ito	6^{3}	4
7	(Japan) H Moriya	7^{7}	6

Semifinals
1	(Slovakia) L Lacko	6	6
7	(Japan) H Moriya	3	3

=== Bottom half ===
First round
6	(Canada) F Dancevic	7^{7}	6
(United States) A El Mihdawy	6^{3}	1
(Dominican Republic) J Hernández	4	3
(Moldova) R Borvanov	6	6
(Canada) F Peliwo	6	6^{4}	6
(Japan) Y Uchiyama	4	7^{7}	4
(Canada) P Polansky	7^{7}	6
4	(Belgium) M Authom	6^{5}	2
8	(Canada) S Diez	5	1
(Australia) B Mitchell	7	6
(Peru) D Beretta	3	7^{8}	3
Q	(Canada) Pavel Krainik	6	6^{6}	6
WC	(Canada) P Bester	6	6
Q	(United States) Tyler Hochwalt	4	2
Q	(Canada) Milan Pokrajac	7^{7}	2	3
2	(France) N Mahut	6^{5}	6	6

Second round
6	(Canada) F Dancevic	6	6
(Moldova) R Borvanov	2	2
WC	(Canada) F Peliwo	3	6	6
(Canada) P Polansky	6	4	4
(Australia) B Mitchell	6	6
Q	(Canada) P Krainik	2	2
WC	(Canada) P Bester	6	3	6
2	(France) N Mahut	4	6	1

Quarterfinals
6	(Canada) F Dancevic	6	6
WC	(Canada) F Peliwo	4	1
(Australia) B Mitchell	6	3	4
WC	(Canada) P Bester	4	6	6

Semifinals
6	(Canada) F Dancevic	6	7
WC	(Canada) P Bester	4	5
