= 2008 Fifth Third Bank Tennis Championships – Men's doubles =

Men's doubles
- 2008 Fifth Third Bank Tennis Championships

Final
- Champions: (Italy) Alessandro Da Col (Italy) Andrea Stoppini
- Runners-up: (France) Olivier Charroin (Canada) Érik Chvojka
- Score: 6–2, 2–6, [10–8]

Details
- Draw: 16 (3WC/1Q/1LL)
- Seeds: 4

Events
Singles	men	women
Doubles	men	women
← 2007 ·	Fifth Third Bank Tennis Championships	· 2009 →

Brendan Evans and Ryan Sweeting were the defending champions, but Sweeting did not compete this year. Evans teamed up with Jamie Baker and lost in quarterfinals to tournament winners Alessandro Da Col and Andrea Stoppini.

Alessandro Da Col and Andrea Stoppini won the title by defeating Olivier Charroin and Érik Chvojka 6–2, 2–6, [10–8] in the final.

== Seeds ==
1. (Thailand) Sanchai Ratiwatana / (Thailand) Sonchat Ratiwatana (quarterfinals)
2. (Israel) Harel Levy / (United States) Jim Thomas (semifinals)
3. (United States) Ryler DeHeart / (United States) Rajeev Ram (quarterfinals)
4. (Italy) Alessandro Da Col / (Italy) Andrea Stoppini (champions)

== Draw ==
=== Key ===
- Q = Qualifier
- WC = Wild card
- LL = Lucky loser
- Alt = Alternate
- SE = Special exempt
- PR = Protected ranking
- ITF = ITF entry
- JE = Junior exempt
- w/o = Walkover
- r = Retired
- d = Defaulted
- SR = Special ranking

=== Draw ===
First round
1	(Thailand) Sa Ratiwatana (Thailand) So Ratiwatana	6	6
WC	(United States) M Fugate (United States) B Koniecko	3	1
(France) O Charroin (Canada) É Chvojka	7	6
(Israel) N Okun (Israel) A Weintraub	5	4
3	(United States) R DeHeart (United States) R Ram	6	6
WC	(United States) C Gaston (United States) S Jenkins	3	1
(United States) B Pomeroy (New Zealand) J Statham	6	4	[7]
Q	(United States) S Bass (United States) T Paul	2	6	[10]
(United Kingdom) J Baker (United States) B Evans
(United States) A Francis (United States) K Kim	w/o
LL	(United States) B Battistone (United States) J Ludlow	4	6	[11]
4	(Italy) A Da Col (Italy) A Stoppini	6	4	[13]
(India) S Devvarman (United States) R Rizza	2	6	[6]
(Dominican Republic) V Estrella (Mexico) S González	6	3	[10]
WC	(Canada) B Agostinelli (United States) B Cox	4	2
2	(Israel) H Levy (United States) J Thomas	6	6

Quarterfinals
1	(Thailand) Sa Ratiwatana (Thailand) So Ratiwatana	6^{7}	7^{7}	[5]
(France) O Charroin (Canada) É Chvojka	7^{9}	6^{3}	[10]
3	(United States) R DeHeart (United States) R Ram	6^{4}	3
Q	(United States) S Bass (United States) T Paul	7^{7}	6
(United Kingdom) J Baker (United States) B Evans	6	0	[5]
4	(Italy) A Da Col (Italy) A Stoppini	1	6	[10]
(Dominican Republic) V Estrella (Mexico) S González	3	4
2	(Israel) H Levy (United States) J Thomas	6	6

Semifinals
(France) O Charroin (Canada) É Chvojka	6	6
Q	(United States) S Bass (United States) T Paul	3	4
4	(Italy) A Da Col (Italy) A Stoppini	7	6
2	(Israel) H Levy (United States) J Thomas	5	4

Final
(France) O Charroin (Canada) É Chvojka	2	6	[8]
4	(Italy) A Da Col (Italy) A Stoppini	6	2	[10]
