= 2009 Fifth Third Bank Tennis Championships – Men's singles =

Men's singles
- 2009 Fifth Third Bank Tennis Championships

Final
- Champion: (Israel) Harel Levy
- Runner-up: (United States) Alex Kuznetsov
- Score: 6–4, 4–6, 6–2

Events
Singles	men	women
Doubles	men	women
← 2008 ·	Fifth Third Bank Tennis Championships	· 2010 →

Somdev Devvarman was the defending champion, but he decided not to start this year.
Harel Levy defeated 6–4, 4–6, 6–2 Alex Kuznetsov in the final.

== Seeds ==
1. (United States) Brendan Evans (second round)
2. (Australia) Chris Guccione (first round)
3. (South Africa) Kevin Anderson (first round)
4. (United States) Ryan Sweeting (second round)
5. (Israel) Harel Levy (champion)
6. (Australia) Carsten Ball (first round)
7. (Australia) Marinko Matosevic (semifinals)
8. (South Korea) Im Kyu-tae (quarterfinals)

== Draw ==
=== Key ===
- Q = Qualifier
- WC = Wild card
- LL = Lucky loser
- Alt = Alternate
- SE = Special exempt
- PR = Protected ranking
- ITF = ITF entry
- JE = Junior exempt
- w/o = Walkover
- r = Retired
- d = Defaulted
- SR = Special ranking

=== Final four ===
Semifinals
(United Kingdom) Daniel Evans	3	1
Q	(United States) Alex Kuznetsov	6	6
5	(Israel) Harel Levy	6	7
7	(Australia) Marinko Matosevic	3	6^{5}

Final
Q	(United States) Alex Kuznetsov	4	6	2
5	(Israel) Harel Levy	6	4	6

=== Top half ===
First round
1	(United States) B Evans	6	6
(United States) R Harrison	2	4
(United Kingdom) D Evans	6	6
WC	(United States) J Cox	4	3
(United States) M Yani	6	6
(Armenia) T Martirosyan	2	4
WC	(United States) D Kudla	4	3
8	(South Korea) K-t Im	6	6
3	(South Africa) K Anderson	6^{3}	3
Q	(United States) A Kuznetsov	7	6
(Canada) P-L Duclos	4	6	0
(South Africa) I van der Merwe	6	3	6
Q	(United States) T Smyczek	6	6
Q	(United States) A Krajicek	3	4
WC	(Canada) B Agostinelli	6	6
6	(Australia) C Ball	4	2

Second round
1	(United States) B Evans	6	1	4
(United Kingdom) D Evans	4	6	6
(United States) M Yani	0	r
8	(South Korea) K-t Im	5
Q	(United States) A Kuznetsov	7	6
(South Africa) I van der Merwe	5	4
Q	(United States) T Smyczek	6	6
WC	(Canada) B Agostinelli	2	2

Quarterfinals
(United Kingdom) D Evans	6	6
8	(South Korea) K-t Im	2	4
Q	(United States) A Kuznetsov	7	6
Q	(United States) T Smyczek	6^{5}	3

Semifinals
(United Kingdom) D Evans	3	1
Q	(United States) A Kuznetsov	6	6

=== Bottom half ===
First round
5	(Israel) H Levy	6	6
(Japan) T Suzuki	4	0
(Australia) N Lindahl	6	6
(United States) N Monroe	1	2
(Germany) S Stadler	5	1
(Germany) T Kamke	7	6
Q	(United States) T Sandgren	2	1
4	(United States) R Sweeting	6	6
7	(Australia) M Matosevic	6	6^{3}	6
(United States) P Simmonds	3	7	2
(United States) S Jenkins	4	0	r
(United States) L Cook	6	1
(Japan) Y Sugita	4	6	4
(United Kingdom) A Bogdanovic	6	3	6
(United States) R DeHeart	7	6
2	(Australia) C Guccione	6^{5}	3

Second round
5	(Israel) H Levy	6	6
(Australia) N Lindahl	4	3
(Germany) T Kamke	7	6
4	(United States) R Sweeting	6^{1}	3
7	(Australia) M Matosevic	6^{4}	7	7
(United States) L Cook	7	6^{7}	6^{5}
(United Kingdom) A Bogdanovic	6	4	6
(United States) R DeHeart	3	6	4

Quarterfinals
5	(Israel) H Levy	1	6	7
(Germany) T Kamke	6	2	6^{6}
7	(Australia) M Matosevic	6	3
(United Kingdom) A Bogdanovic	4	2	r

Semifinals
5	(Israel) H Levy	6	7
7	(Australia) M Matosevic	3	6^{5}
