= 2008 Fifth Third Bank Tennis Championships – Men's singles =

Men's singles
- 2008 Fifth Third Bank Tennis Championships

Final
- Champion: (India) Somdev Devvarman
- Runner-up: (United States) Robert Kendrick
- Score: 6–3, 6–3

Details
- Draw: 32 (4WC/4Q/2SE)
- Seeds: 8

Events
Singles	men	women
Doubles	men	women
← 2007 ·	Lexington Challenger	· 2009 →

John Isner was the defending champion, but decided not to compete this year.

Somdev Devvarman won the tournament, defeating Robert Kendrick in the final, 6–3, 6–3.

== Seeds ==
1. (Israel) Dudi Sela (semifinals)
2. (United States) Bobby Reynolds (second round)
3. (United States) Robert Kendrick (final)
4. (Denmark) Kristian Pless (first round)
5. (United States) Amer Delić (quarterfinals)
6. (Israel) Harel Levy (first round)
7. (United States) Brendan Evans (first round)
8. (United States) Kevin Kim (first round)

== Draw ==
=== Key ===
- Q = Qualifier
- WC = Wild card
- LL = Lucky loser
- Alt = Alternate
- SE = Special exempt
- PR = Protected ranking
- ITF = ITF entry
- JE = Junior exempt
- w/o = Walkover
- r = Retired
- d = Defaulted
- SR = Special ranking

=== Finals ===
Semifinals
1	(Israel) Dudi Sela	7	1	4
3	(United States) Robert Kendrick	5	6	6
(Belgium) Xavier Malisse	1^{r}
Q	(India) Somdev Devvarman	4

Final
3	(United States) Robert Kendrick	3	3
Q	(India) Somdev Devvarman	6	6

=== Top half ===
First round
1	(Israel) D Sela	7	6
Q	(United States) R Rizza	5	4
(Israel) N Okun	7	6
(Australia) N Lindahl	5	3
Q	(United States) J O'Neal	0	6	6
SE	(Canada) É Chvojka	6	3	3
5/WC	(United States) A Delić	4	7	6
(Brazil) R Hocevar	6	6^{1}	4
3	(United States) R Kendrick	1	6	6
(Mexico) S González	6	4	4
(United States) R Ram	6	6
Q	(United States) A Francis	4	2
(United States) M Yani	7	6
WC	(United States) C Buchanan	6^{3}	0
(United States) R De Heart	7	6
8	(United States) K Kim	5	4

Second round
1	(Israel) D Sela	6	6
(Israel) N Okun	2	3
Q	(United States) J O'Neal	4	2
5/WC	(United States) A Delić	6	6
3	(United States) R Kendrick	4	6	6
(United States) R Ram	6	4	4
(United States) M Yani	4	3^{r}
(United States) R DeHeart	6	4

Quarterfinals
1	(Israel) D Sela	2	7	7
5/WC	(United States) A Delić	6	6^{6}	5
3	(United States) R Kendrick	6	6
(United States) R DeHeart	3	4

Semifinals
1	(Israel) D Sela	7	1	4
3	(United States) R Kendrick	5	6	6

=== Bottom half ===
First round
WC	(United States) R Williams	5
6	(Israel) H Levy	2^{r}
(Belgium) X Malisse	7	6
(United States) S Jenkins	5	1
(South Africa) I van der Merwe	6	6
(United States) A Kuznetsov	2	2
(Dominican Republic) V Estrella	6	6
4	(Denmark) K Pless	3	4
WC	(United States) B Koniecko	6	6^{8}	6
7	(United States) B Evans	2	7	3
(Italy) A Stoppini	7	6
(Australia) C Ebelthite	5	4
Q	(India) S Devvarman	7	6
(United Kingdom) J Baker	5	2
2	(United States) B Reynolds	6	6
SE	(Japan) T Matsui	4	4

Second round
WC	(United States) R Williams	3	1
(Belgium) X Malisse	6	6
(South Africa) I van der Merwe	2	3
(Dominican Republic) V Estrella	6	6
WC	(United States) B Koniecko	1	6^{7}
(Italy) A Stoppini	6	7
Q	(India) S Devvarman	6	7	6
2	(United States) B Reynolds	7	5	4

Quarterfinals
(Belgium) X Malisse	6	6
(Dominican Republic) V Estrella	4	3
(Italy) A Stoppini	6^{5}	1
Q	(India) S Devvarman	7	6

Semifinals
(Belgium) X Malisse	1^{r}
Q	(India) S Devvarman	4
