= 2008 Fifth Third Bank Tennis Championships – Women's doubles =

Women's doubles
- 2008 Fifth Third Bank Tennis Championships

Final
- Champions: (Chinese Taipei) Chan Chin-wei (United States) Kimberly Couts
- Runners-up: (United States) Lindsay Lee-Waters (United States) Melanie Oudin
- Score: 2–6, 6–3, [10–8]

Details
- Draw: 16 (2WC)
- Seeds: 4

Events
Singles	men	women
Doubles	men	women
← 2007 ·	Lexington Challenger	· 2009 →

Melinda Czink and Lindsay Lee-Waters were the defending champions but Czink did not compete this year, as she chose to compete at Los Angeles during the same week, reaching the third round in singles.

Lee-Waters teamed up with Melanie Oudin and lost in the final to Chan Chin-wei and Kimberly Couts. The score was 2–6, 6–3, [10–8].

== Seeds ==
1. (Brazil) Maria Fernanda Alves / (United States) Robin Stephenson (first round)
2. (Latvia) Līga Dekmeijere / (Czech Republic) Nikola Fraňková (first round)
3. (n/a)
4. (Chinese Taipei) Chan Chin-wei / (United States) Kimberly Couts (champions)

== Draw ==
=== Key ===
- Q = Qualifier
- WC = Wild card
- LL = Lucky loser
- Alt = Alternate
- SE = Special exempt
- PR = Protected ranking
- ITF = ITF entry
- JE = Junior exempt
- w/o = Walkover
- r = Retired
- d = Defaulted
- SR = Special ranking

=== Draw ===
First round
1	(Brazil) MF Alves (United States) R Stephenson	6^{4}	6	[7]
(Chinese Taipei) K-c Chang (Chinese Taipei) I-h Hwang	7^{7}	3	[10]
(United States) H Barte (United States) J Elie	2	4
(United States) C Gullickson (Australia) N Kriz	6	6
4	(Chinese Taipei) C-w Chan (United States) K Couts	6	2	[10]
WC	(United States) Amanda McDowell (United States) A Prousis	4	6	[6]
(United States) K Frilling (United States) A Mueller	6	6
(United States) W Jones (United States) Tiya Rolle	2	1
(Canada) S Fichman (United States) S Tweedie-Yates	4	6^{3}
(South Africa) K Anderson (United Kingdom) G Gent	6	7^{7}
(United States) L Albanese (United States) A Will	6	6
(Ukraine) Anastasia Kharchenko (South Korea) Y-r Lee	3	3
WC	(United States) Merritt Emery (United States) Tiffany Welcher	1	2
(United States) N Uberoi (India) S Uberoi	6	6
(United States) L Lee-Waters (United States) M Oudin	6	7
2	(Latvia) L Dekmeijere (Czech Republic) N Fraňková	4	5

Quarterfinals
(Chinese Taipei) K-c Chang (Chinese Taipei) I-h Hwang	2	6	[10]
(United States) C Gullickson (Australia) N Kriz	6	4	[4]
4	(Chinese Taipei) C-w Chan (United States) K Couts	3	6	[10]
(United States) K Frilling (United States) A Mueller	6	2	[6]
(South Africa) K Anderson (United Kingdom) G Gent	6	7^{7}
(United States) L Albanese (United States) A Will	3	6^{0}
(United States) N Uberoi (India) S Uberoi	5	3
(United States) L Lee-Waters (United States) M Oudin	7	6

Semifinals
(Chinese Taipei) K-c Chang (Chinese Taipei) I-h Hwang	7^{10}	1	[5]
4	(Chinese Taipei) C-w Chan (United States) K Couts	6^{8}	6	[10]
(South Africa) K Anderson (United Kingdom) G Gent	6	6^{7}	[8]
(United States) L Lee-Waters (United States) M Oudin	4	7^{9}	[10]

Final
4	(Chinese Taipei) C-w Chan (United States) K Couts	2	6	[10]
(United States) L Lee-Waters (United States) M Oudin	6	3	[8]
