= 2008 Fifth Third Bank Tennis Championships – Women's singles =

Women's singles
- 2008 Fifth Third Bank Tennis Championships

Final
- Champion: (United States) Melanie Oudin
- Runner-up: (United States) Carly Gullickson
- Score: 6–4, 6–2

Details
- Draw: 32 (4WC/4Q/1LL/1SR)
- Seeds: 8

Events
Singles	men	women
Doubles	men	women
← 2007 ·	Lexington Challenger	· 2009 →

Stéphanie Dubois was the defending champion but chose to compete at Los Angeles during the same week, reaching the second round.

16-year old Melanie Oudin won the title by defeating Carly Gullickson 6–4, 6–2 in the final.

== Seeds ==
1. (United Kingdom) Elena Baltacha (first round)
2. (United States) Varvara Lepchenko (second round)
3. (Japan) Junri Namigata (quarterfinals)
4. (Japan) Kumiko Iijima (first round, retired)
5. (South Korea) Lee Ye-ra (semifinals)
6. (United States) Lauren Albanese (first round)
7. (Chinese Taipei) Chan Chin-wei (semifinals)
8. (United States) Melanie Oudin (champion)

== Draw ==
=== Key ===
- Q = Qualifier
- WC = Wild card
- LL = Lucky loser
- Alt = Alternate
- SE = Special exempt
- PR = Protected ranking
- ITF = ITF entry
- JE = Junior exempt
- w/o = Walkover
- r = Retired
- d = Defaulted
- SR = Special ranking

=== Finals ===
Semifinals
(United States) Carly Gullickson	1	6	6
7	(Chinese Taipei) Chan Chin-wei	6	3	1
5	(South Korea) Lee Ye-ra	4	2
8	(United States) Melanie Oudin	6	6

Final
(United States) Carly Gullickson	4	2
8	(United States) Melanie Oudin	6	6

=== Top half ===
First round
1	(United Kingdom) E Baltacha	4	6	1
(United States) C Gullickson	6	2	6
Q	(United States) Maureen Diaz	4	3
(Venezuela) G Paz	6	6
Q	(United States) N Uberoi	4	5
Q	(United States) C McHale	6	7
Q	(United States) L Lee-Waters	6	5	6
6	(United States) L Albanese	4	7	2
4	(Japan) K Iijima	1	r
WC	(United States) A Prousis	6
(Czech Republic) N Fraňková	4	4
(United States) S Tweedie-Yates	6	6
WC	(United States) M Gambale	0	1
(United States) A Mueller	6	6
(Canada) S Fichman	4	4
7	(Chinese Taipei) C-w Chan	6	6

Second round
(United States) C Gullickson	7	6
(Venezuela) G Paz	5	1
Q	(United States) C McHale	5	3
Q	(United States) L Lee-Waters	7	6
WC	(United States) A Prousis	3	6	4
(United States) S Tweedie-Yates	6	3	6
(United States) A Mueller	3	6^{6}
7	(Chinese Taipei) C-w Chan	6	7^{8}

Quarterfinals
(United States) C Gullickson	4	6	7
Q	(United States) L Lee-Waters	6	4	5
(United States) S Tweedie-Yates	4	2
7	(Chinese Taipei) C-w Chan	6	6

Semifinals
(United States) C Gullickson	1	6	6
7	(Chinese Taipei) C-w Chan	6	3	1

=== Bottom half ===
First round
5	(South Korea) Y-r Lee	7^{11}	6
LL	(United States) Tiya Rolle	6^{9}	2
WC	(Germany) K Grajdek	0	1
(Australia) N Kriz	6	6
(Republic of Ireland) K Liggan	4	1
(Chinese Taipei) I-h Hwang	6	6
(Slovenia) P Rampre	6	3	1
3	(Japan) J Namigata	2	6	6
8	(United States) M Oudin	6	6
(Brazil) MF Alves	1	4
(Chinese Taipei) K-c Chang	4	6	4
(United States) K Couts	6	3	6
SR	(United Kingdom) G Gent	4	6	6
WC	(United States) H Barte	6	4	0
(United States) J Cohen	6^{4}	6^{5}
2	(United States) V Lepchenko	7^{7}	7^{7}

Second round
5	(South Korea) Y-r Lee	6	3	6
(Australia) N Kriz	3	6	1
(Chinese Taipei) I-h Hwang	1	2
3	(Japan) J Namigata	6	6
8	(United States) M Oudin	6	6
(United States) K Couts	1	1
SR	(United Kingdom) G Gent	7	1	6
2	(United States) V Lepchenko	5	6	3

Quarterfinals
5	(South Korea) Y-r Lee	7	6
3	(Japan) J Namigata	5	3
8	(United States) M Oudin	7	6
SR	(United Kingdom) G Gent	5	3

Semifinals
5	(South Korea) Y-r Lee	4	2
8	(United States) M Oudin	6	6
