= 2009 Fifth Third Bank Tennis Championships =

- Date: July 20 – July 26
- Edition: 15th
- Location: Lexington, Kentucky, United States

Champions

Men's singles
- (Israel) Harel Levy

Women's singles
- (India) Sania Mirza

Men's doubles
- (South Africa) Kevin Anderson / (United States) Ryler DeHeart

Women's doubles
- (Chinese Taipei) Chang Kai-chen / (Ukraine) Tetiana Luzhanska
- Fifth Third Bank Tennis Championships

The 2009 Fifth Third Bank Tennis Championships was a professional tennis tournament played on Hard court. It was a sixteenth edition of the tournament which was part of the 2009 ATP Challenger Tour. It took place in Lexington, Kentucky, United States between 20 and 26 July 2009.

== ATP entrants ==
=== Seeds ===
Nationality	Player	Ranking*	Seeding
USA	Brendan Evans	134	1
AUS	Chris Guccione	137	2
RSA	Kevin Anderson	160	3
USA	Ryan Sweeting	162	4
ISR	Harel Levy	183	5
AUS	Carsten Ball	187	6
AUS	Marinko Matosevic	208	7
KOR	Im Kyu-tae	209	8

- Rankings are as of July 13, 2009.

=== Other entrants ===
The following players received wildcards into the singles main draw:

- (Canada) Bruno Agostinelli
- (United States) Jordan Cox
- (United States) Ryan Harrison
- (United States) Denis Kudla

The following players received entry from the qualifying draw:

- (United States) Austin Krajicek
- (United States) Alex Kuznetsov
- (United States) Tennys Sandgren
- (United States) Tim Smyczek

== Champions ==
=== Singles ===
(Israel) Harel Levy def. (United States) Alex Kuznetsov, 6–4, 4–6, 6–2

=== Doubles ===
(South Africa) Kevin Anderson / (United States) Ryler DeHeart def. (Israel) Amir Hadad / (Israel) Harel Levy, 6–4, 4–6, [10–6]
