= Boris Nicola Bakalov =

Bulgarian tennis player

Boris Nicola Bakalov Борис Никола Бакалов
- Country (sports): Bulgaria
- Residence: United States
- Born: 23 November 1980 (age 44); Münster, Germany
- Height: 1.83 m (6 ft 0 in)
- Turned pro: 2006
- Retired: 2018
- Plays: Left-handed (one-handed backhand)
- Prize money: US$ 24,911

Singles
- Career record: 0–0 (at ATP Tour level, Grand Slam level, and in Davis Cup)
- Career titles: 0; 0 Challengers, 0 Futures
- Highest ranking: 621 (21 November 2011)

Doubles
- Career record: 0–0 (at ATP Tour level, Grand Slam level, and in Davis Cup)
- Career titles: 0; 0 Challengers, 3 Futures
- Highest ranking: 457 (4 July 2011)
- Last updated on: 29 January 2021.

Boris Nicola Bakalov (Bulgarian: Борис Никола Бакалов, born 23 November 1980) is a former professional Bulgarian tennis player. On 21 November 2011, he reached his highest ATP singles ranking of 621 whilst his best doubles ranking was 457 on 4 July 2011. He played for and graduated from Azusa Pacific University in 2006.

== Year-end rankings ==
| Year | 2007 | 2008 | 2009 | 2010 | 2011 | 2012 | 2013 | 2014 | 2015 | 2016 |
| Singles | - | - | 1055 | 938 | 637 | 1485 | 1031 | - | 1512 | - |
| Doubles | 1175 | 805 | 1075 | 608 | 592 | 1060 | 1208 | - | 1076 | 1467 |

== Challenger and Futures Finals ==
=== Singles: 1 (0–1) ===
| Legend (singles) ATP Challenger Tour (0–0) ITF Futures (0–1) | Titles by surface Hard (0–1) Clay (0–0) Grass (0–0) Carpet (0–0) |

| Result | W–L | Date | Tournament | Tier | Surface | Opponent | Score |
|---|---|---|---|---|---|---|---|
| Loss | 0–1 | Sep 2011 | Mexico F10, Zacatecas | Futures | Hard | (Mexico) César Ramírez | 3–6, 3–6 |

=== Doubles: 11 (3–8) ===
| Legend (doubles) ATP Challenger Tour (0–0) ITF Futures (3–8) | Titles by surface Hard (1–5) Clay (2–3) Grass (0–0) Carpet (0–0) |

| Result | W–L | Date | Tournament | Tier | Surface | Partner | Opponents | Score |
|---|---|---|---|---|---|---|---|---|
| Loss | 0–1 | May 2007 | Bulgaria F2, Rousse | Futures | Clay | (India) Ashutosh Singh | (Sweden) Carl Bergman (Sweden) Daniel Kumlin | 2–6, 6–2, 3–6 |
| Win | 1–1 | Sep 2008 | Bulgaria F8, Stara Zagora | Futures | Clay | (Bulgaria) Vasko Mladenov | (Serbia) Ivan Bjelica (Serbia) Miljan Zekić | 6–3, 6–4 |
| Loss | 1–2 | Oct 2008 | U.S.A. F27, Mansfield | Futures | Hard | (Poland) Bojan Szumański | (Australia) Carsten Ball (Australia) Colin Ebelthite | 2–6, 5–7 |
| Loss | 1–3 | Aug 2010 | Bulgaria F4, Sofia | Futures | Clay | (Bulgaria) Alexander Lazov | (Germany) Pirmin Haenle (Spain) Óscar Sabate-Bretos | 4–6, 6–3, [7–10] |
| Loss | 1–4 | Dec 2010 | Mexico F11, Chiapas | Futures | Hard | (Austria) Rainer Eitzinger | (United States) Adam El Mihdawy (United States) Ty Trombetta | 4–6, 7–6^{(7–4)}, [7–10] |
| Loss | 1–5 | Jan 2011 | Guatemala F1, Guatemala City | Futures | Hard | (United States) Adam El Mihdawy | (Zimbabwe) Takanyi Garanganga (United States) Blake Strode | 5–7, 5–7 |
| Loss | 1–6 | Feb 2011 | Panama F1, Panama City | Futures | Clay | (Germany) Alexander Satschko | (Uruguay) Martín Cuevas (Uruguay) Marcel Felder | 5–7, 3–6 |
| Loss | 1–7 | Feb 2011 | U.S.A. F5, Brownsville | Futures | Hard | (Georgia (country)) Nikoloz Basilashvili | (United States) Devin Britton (United States) Greg Ouellette | 1–6, 3–6 |
| Win | 2–7 | Sep 2011 | Mexico F8, León | Futures | Hard | (Netherlands) Miliaan Niesten | (Mexico) Miguel Gallardo Valles (Mexico) Pablo Martínez | 6–4, 6–3 |
| Loss | 1–8 | Oct 2013 | Greece F13, Marathon | Futures | Hard | (Netherlands) Alban Meuffels | (Italy) Riccardo Ghedin (Italy) Claudio Grassi | 3–6, 2–6 |
| Win | 2–8 | Nov 2015 | U.S.A. F32, Niceville | Futures | Clay | (United States) Brian Battistone | (United States) Nick Chappell (United States) Dane Webb | 7–6^{(7–5)}, 5–7, [10–6] |
