= 2013 Challenger Banque Nationale de Granby – Women's doubles =

Women's doubles
- 2013 Challenger Banque Nationale de Granby

Final
- Champions: (United States) Lena Litvak (Canada) Carol Zhao
- Runners-up: (France) Julie Coin (United Kingdom) Emily Webley-Smith
- Score: 7–5, 6–4

Events
Singles	men	women
Doubles	men	women
- Challenger de Granby

Sharon Fichman and Marie-Ève Pelletier were the defending champions, having won the event in 2012, but both players chose not to defend their title.

Lena Litvak and Carol Zhao won the tournament, defeating Julie Coin and Emily Webley-Smith in the final, 7–5, 6–4.

== Seeds ==
1. (France) Julie Coin / (United Kingdom) Emily Webley-Smith (final)
2. (United Kingdom) Samantha Murray / (United Kingdom) Jade Windley (first round)
3. (Japan) Misa Eguchi / (Japan) Akiko Omae (semifinals)
4. (United Kingdom) Naomi Broady / (Australia) Olivia Rogowska (first round)

== Draw ==
Key

- Q = Qualifier
- WC = Wild card
- LL = Lucky loser
- Alt = Alternate
- ITF = ITF entry
- PR = Protected ranking
- SR = Special ranking
- SE = Special exempt
- JE = Junior exempt
- JR = Junior Accelerator Programme entrant
- CO = College Accelerator Programme entrant
- NG = Next Gen Accelerator Program entrant
- w/o = Walkover
- r = Retired
- d = Defaulted

First round
1	(France) J Coin (United Kingdom) E Webley-Smith	6	6
(Japan) N Hibino (Japan) E Mutaguchi	3	2
(Japan) M Imanishi (Japan) M Minokoshi	3	2
(Canada) E Fournier (Canada) P Januskova	6	6
3	(Japan) M Eguchi (Japan) A Omae	6	7^{7}
(Japan) E Hozumi (Slovakia) L Wienerová	4	6^{4}
WC	(Canada) V Dimuzio (Canada) M Patrascu	2	3
(Canada) S Molnar (Canada) E Routliffe	6	6
(France) S Benamar (Canada) J O'Neill	6^{2}	4
(United States) R Alda (United States) D Mills	7^{7}	6
(United States) L Litvak (Canada) C Zhao	6	6
4	(United Kingdom) N Broady (Australia) O Rogowska	2	4
(Australia) B Rischbieth (Israel) K Shlomo	6^{6}	3
(Canada) K Blajkevitch (Japan) K Ito	7^{8}	6
(Canada) M-A Leduc (Canada) G Liang	7	2	[11]
2	(United Kingdom) S Murray (United Kingdom) J Windley	5	6	[9]

Quarterfinals
1	(France) J Coin (United Kingdom) E Webley-Smith	6	7^{8}
(Canada) E Fournier (Canada) P Januskova	4	6^{6}
3	(Japan) M Eguchi (Japan) A Omae	6	7^{7}
(Canada) S Molnar (Canada) E Routliffe	2	6^{5}
(United States) R Alda (United States) D Mills	4	4
(United States) L Litvak (Canada) C Zhao	6	6
(Canada) K Blajkevitch (Japan) K Ito	3	2
(Canada) M-A Leduc (Canada) G Liang	6	6

Semifinals
1	(France) J Coin (United Kingdom) E Webley-Smith	2	6	[10]
3	(Japan) M Eguchi (Japan) A Omae	6	2	[8]
(United States) L Litvak (Canada) C Zhao	6	6
(Canada) M-A Leduc (Canada) G Liang	4	4

Final
1	(France) J Coin (United Kingdom) E Webley-Smith	5	4
(United States) L Litvak (Canada) C Zhao	7	6
