= 2013 Challenger Banque Nationale de Granby – Men's doubles =

Men's doubles
- 2013 Challenger Banque Nationale de Granby

Final
- Champions: (Canada) Érik Chvojka (Canada) Peter Polansky
- Runners-up: (United States) Adam El Mihdawy (Croatia) Ante Pavić
- Score: 6–4, 6–3

Events
Singles	men	women
Doubles	men	women
- Challenger de Granby

Philip Bester and Vasek Pospisil were the defending champions but decided not to participate.

Érik Chvojka and Peter Polansky won the title, defeating Adam El Mihdawy and Ante Pavić 6–4, 6–3 in the final.

== Seeds ==
The top two seeds received a bye into the quarterfinals.

1. (Belgium) Maxime Authom / (Slovakia) Lukáš Lacko (semifinals)
2. (Japan) Hiroki Kondo / (Japan) Yasutaka Uchiyama (quarterfinals)
3. (Canada) Érik Chvojka / (Canada) Peter Polansky (champion)
4. (Peru) Duilio Beretta / (Dominican Republic) José Hernández (quarterfinals)

== Draw ==
Key

- Q = Qualifier
- WC = Wild card
- LL = Lucky loser
- Alt = Alternate
- ITF = ITF entry
- PR = Protected ranking
- SR = Special ranking
- SE = Special exempt
- JE = Junior exempt
- JR = Junior Accelerator Programme entrant
- CO = College Accelerator Programme entrant
- NG = Next Gen Accelerator Program entrant
- w/o = Walkover
- r = Retired
- d = Defaulted

=== Draw ===
First round
(Moldova) R Borvanov (Canada) Milan Pokrajac	6	7
WC	(Canada) Nikolai Haessig (Canada) Pavel Krainik	3	5
3	(Canada) É Chvojka (Canada) P Polansky	6	6
(Japan) T Ito (Japan) H Moriya	4	3
(Australia) M Reid (United Kingdom) J Ward	6	6
(Canada) Andrew Ochotta (Japan) K Takeuchi	3	1
(Canada) Hugo Di Feo (Canada) B Schnur	6	6
(Belgium) Jonas Merckx (France) C Reix	1	2
WC	(Canada) Philippe Courteau (Canada) Alexandru Pavel	4	2
4	(Peru) D Beretta (Dominican Republic) J Hernández	6	6
(United States) A El Mihdawy (Croatia) A Pavić	2	6	[10]
WC	(Canada) S Diez (Canada) F Peliwo	6	3	[8]

Quarterfinals
1	(Belgium) M Authom (Slovakia) L Lacko	7^{7}	6
(Moldova) R Borvanov (Canada) M Pokrajac	6^{5}	1
3	(Canada) É Chvojka (Canada) P Polansky	5	6	[10]
(Australia) M Reid (United Kingdom) J Ward	7	3	[7]
(Canada) H Di Feo (Canada) B Schnur	6	6
4	(Peru) D Beretta (Dominican Republic) J Hernández	2	2
(United States) A El Mihdawy (Croatia) A Pavić	6	7^{7}
2	(Japan) H Kondo (Japan) Y Uchiyama	4	6^{5}

Semifinals
1	(Belgium) M Authom (Slovakia) L Lacko	1	2
3	(Canada) É Chvojka (Canada) P Polansky	6	6
(Canada) H Di Feo (Canada) B Schnur	3	7	[4]
(United States) A El Mihdawy (Croatia) A Pavić	6	5	[10]

Final
3	(Canada) É Chvojka (Canada) P Polansky	6	6
(United States) A El Mihdawy (Croatia) A Pavić	4	3
