= 2009 Fifth Third Bank Tennis Championships – Men's doubles =

Men's doubles
- 2009 Fifth Third Bank Tennis Championships

Final
- Champions: (South Africa) Kevin Anderson (United States) Ryler DeHeart
- Runners-up: (Israel) Amir Hadad (Israel) Harel Levy
- Score: 6–4, 4–6, [10–6]

Events
Singles	Doubles
← 2008 ·	Fifth Third Bank Tennis Championships	· 2010 →

Alessandro da Col and Andrea Stoppini were the defending champions.
Kevin Anderson and Ryler DeHeart won in the final 6–4, 4–6, [10–6], against Amir Hadad and Harel Levy.

== Seeds ==
1. (Thailand) Sanchai Ratiwatana / (Thailand) Sonchat Ratiwatana (semifinals)
2. (United States) Brendan Evans / (United States) Ryan Sweeting (quarterfinals)
3. (Israel) Amir Hadad / (Israel) Harel Levy (final)
4. (Canada) Pierre-Ludovic Duclos / (United States) Nicholas Monroe (first round)

== Draw ==
=== Key ===
- Q = Qualifier
- WC = Wild card
- LL = Lucky loser
- Alt = Alternate
- SE = Special exempt
- PR = Protected ranking
- ITF = ITF entry
- JE = Junior exempt
- w/o = Walkover
- r = Retired
- d = Defaulted
- SR = Special ranking

=== Draw ===
First round
1	(Thailand) Sa Ratiwatana (Thailand) So Ratiwatana	6	6
(South Korea) KT Im (Japan) Y Sugita	4	2
(United States) A Kuznetsov (United States) T Smyczek	5	4
(Armenia) T Martirosyan (South Africa) I van der Merwe	7	6
3	(Israel) A Hadad (Israel) H Levy	6	6
(Australia) N Lindahl (Australia) M Matosevic	2	0
(Japan) H Kondo (Germany) S Stadler	4	2
(United Kingdom) A Bogdanovic (United Kingdom) D Evans	6	6
(United States) L Cook (United States) M Yani	6	7
Q	(Philippines) TC Huey (United States) P Simmonds	4	6^{5}
(South Africa) K Anderson (United States) R DeHeart	6	7
4	(Canada) P-L Duclos (United States) N Monroe	3	6^{3}
WC	(United States) Bradley Cox (United States) J Cox	3	6	[11]
WC	(Canada) B Agostinelli (United States) E Quigley	6	1	[13]
WC	(United States) D Sandgren (United States) T Sandgren	4	3
2	(United States) B Evans (United States) R Sweeting	6	6

Quarterfinals
1	(Thailand) Sa Ratiwatana (Thailand) So Ratiwatana	6	6
(Armenia) T Martirosyan (South Africa) I van der Merwe	2	3
3	(Israel) A Hadad (Israel) H Levy
(United Kingdom) A Bogdanovic (United Kingdom) D Evans	w/o
(United States) L Cook (United States) M Yani	2	1
(South Africa) K Anderson (United States) R DeHeart	6	6
WC	(Canada) B Agostinelli (United States) E Quigley	6	6
2	(United States) B Evans (United States) R Sweeting	4	3

Semifinals
1	(Thailand) Sa Ratiwatana (Thailand) So Ratiwatana	6^{5}	2
3	(Israel) A Hadad (Israel) H Levy	7	6
(South Africa) K Anderson (United States) R DeHeart	6	4	[13]
WC	(Canada) B Agostinelli (United States) E Quigley	4	6	[11]

Finals
3	(Israel) A Hadad (Israel) H Levy	4	6	[6]
(South Africa) K Anderson (United States) R DeHeart	6	4	[10]
