= 2013 Challenger Banque Nationale de Granby – Women's singles =

Women's singles
- 2013 Challenger Banque Nationale de Granby

Final
- Champion: (Japan) Risa Ozaki
- Runner-up: (United Kingdom) Samantha Murray
- Score: 0–6, 7–5, 6–2

Events
Singles	men	women
Doubles	men	women
← 2012 ·	Challenger de Granby	· 2014 →

Eugenie Bouchard was the defending champion, having won the event in 2012, but she chose not to defend her title.

Risa Ozaki won the tournament, defeating Samantha Murray in the final, 0–6, 7–5, 6–2.

== Seeds ==
1. (Australia) Olivia Rogowska (quarterfinals)
2. (France) Julie Coin (semifinals)
3. (United Kingdom) Samantha Murray (final)
4. (Japan) Risa Ozaki (champion)
5. (Japan) Misa Eguchi (first round)
6. (Japan) Eri Hozumi (semifinals)
7. (United Kingdom) Naomi Broady (second round)
8. (Japan) Mai Minokoshi (first round)

== Main draw ==
=== Key ===
- Q = Qualifier
- WC = Wild card
- LL = Lucky loser
- Alt = Alternate
- SE = Special exempt
- PR = Protected ranking
- ITF = ITF entry
- JE = Junior exempt
- w/o = Walkover
- r = Retired
- d = Defaulted
- SR = Special ranking

=== Finals ===
Semifinals
6	(Japan) Eri Hozumi	2	2
4	(Japan) Risa Ozaki	6	6
3	(United Kingdom) Samantha Murray	2	6	6
2	(France) Julie Coin	6	4	3

Final
4	(Japan) Risa Ozaki	0	7	6
3	(United Kingdom) Samantha Murray	6	5	2

=== Top half ===
First round
1	(Australia) O Rogowska	6	6
Q	(United States) C Makarova	2	4
WC	(Canada) C Zhao	6	2	1
(Japan) K Ito	1	6	6
(Japan) N Hibino	7^{12}	6
Q	(Canada) E Routliffe	6^{10}	3
(Japan) A Yamasoto	0	4
6	(Japan) E Hozumi	6	6
4	(Japan) R Ozaki	6	6
WC	(Canada) E Fournier	2	3
(United Kingdom) E Webley-Smith	3	6^{6}
(Japan) M Imanishi	6	7^{10}
(France) S Benamar	6	6
(Slovakia) L Wienerová	4	1
Q	(United States) R Alda	0	1
7	(United Kingdom) N Broady	6	6

Second round
1	(Australia) O Rogowska	6	5	6
(Japan) K Ito	4	7	1
(Japan) N Hibino	3	6^{4}
6	(Japan) E Hozumi	6	7^{7}
4	(Japan) R Ozaki	6	6
(Japan) M Imanishi	2	2
(France) S Benamar	1	6	6
7	(United Kingdom) N Broady	6	4	1

Quarterfinals
1	(Australia) O Rogowska	7	1	2
6	(Japan) E Hozumi	5	6	6
4	(Japan) R Ozaki	6	6
(France) S Benamar	4	3

Semifinals
6	(Japan) E Hozumi	2	2
4	(Japan) R Ozaki	6	6

=== Bottom half ===
First round
5	(Japan) M Eguchi	6	4	0
(United Kingdom) J Windley	1	6	6
Q	(United States) L Litvak	4	5
Q	(Japan) R Sawayanagi	6	7
WC	(Canada) S Molnar	6	5	6
Q	(United States) K Ruckert	3	7	2
(Russia) N Kukharchuk	6^{4}	1
3	(United Kingdom) S Murray	7^{7}	6
8	(Japan) M Minokoshi	7^{8}	6^{3}	3
(Japan) M Miyamura	6^{6}	7^{7}	6
Q	(Canada) K Blajkevitch	1	3
(Japan) A Omae	6	6
WC	(Canada) M-A Leduc	3	0
Q	(Canada) J O'Neill	6	6
(Israel) K Shlomo	1	2
2	(France) J Coin	6	6

Second round
(United Kingdom) J Windley	3	5
Q	(Japan) R Sawayanagi	6	7
WC	(Canada) S Molnar	3	2
3	(United Kingdom) S Murray	6	6
(Japan) M Miyamura	6	3	6
(Japan) A Omae	1	6	2
Q	(Canada) J O'Neill	3	0
2	(France) J Coin	6	6

Quarterfinals
Q	(Japan) R Sawayanagi	1	1
3	(United Kingdom) S Murray	6	6
(Japan) M Miyamura	4	0
2	(France) J Coin	6	6

Semifinals
3	(United Kingdom) S Murray	2	6	6
2	(France) J Coin	6	4	3
