= Justin O'Neal =

American tennis player

- Full name: Justin M. O'Neal
- Country (sports): United States
- Born: October 24, 1977 (age 47); U.S.
- Plays: 6 ft 1 in
- Prize money: $15,513

Singles
- Career record: 0–1
- Highest ranking: No. 601 (Oct 13, 2008)

Doubles
- Highest ranking: No. 1122 (Oct 25, 1999)

Justin O'Neal (born October 24, 1977) is an American former professional tennis player.

O'Neal, an Ohio native, played collegiate tennis for the Florida Gators and had to wait until the age of 30 to make his ATP Tour main draw debut, having spent several years out of the game following graduation. His debut came at the 2008 Indianapolis Tennis Championships, which he qualified for with wins over Jason Marshall and Brendan Evans. He was beaten in the first round by world number 77 Lu Yen-hsun in two tiebreak sets, failing to convert three set points in the second tiebreak.

In 2013 he was announced as an inductee into the University of Florida Athletics Hall of Fame. He was a three-time singles All-American for the Gators and retired with a record tally for career singles wins.
