= Adam El Mihdawy =

American tennis player

- Country (sports): United States
- Born: September 8, 1989 (age 36)
- Prize money: $170,605

Singles
- Career record: 0–0 (at ATP Tour level, Grand Slam level, and in Davis Cup)
- Career titles: 0; 0 Challenger, 14 Futures
- Highest ranking: No. 281 (27 April 2015)

Doubles
- Career record: 0–1 (at ATP Tour level, Grand Slam level, and in Davis Cup)
- Career titles: 0; 0 Challenger, 12 Futures
- Highest ranking: No. 330 (26 August 2013)

Adam El Mihdawy (born August 9, 1989) is an American tennis player.

El Mihdawy has a career high ATP singles ranking of World No. 281 achieved on 27 April 2015 and a career high ATP doubles ranking of World No. 330 achieved on 26 August 2013.

He was coached by former Moroccan tennis player Mehdy Karbid.

El Mihdawy made his ATP main draw debut at the 2008 Pilot Pen Tennis held on hard courts in New Haven, Connecticut when he was given a wild card direct entry into the doubles draw partnering Jesse Levine. The pair would go on to be defeated by Brazilian duo Marcelo Melo and André Sá.

El Mihdawy has reached 30 career singles finals, with a record of 14 wins and 16 losses all coming on the ITF Futures tour. Additionally, he has reached 23 career doubles finals with a record of 12 wins and 11 losses, which includes an 0–1 record in ATP Challenger Tour finals.

In 2022, El Mihdawy was fined $5,000 and banned from tennis for 3 1/2 years after he admitted to fixing 2 matches in 2016.

== ATP Challenger and ITF Futures finals ==
=== Singles: 30 (14–16) ===
Legend ATP Challenger (0–0) ITF Futures (14–16)	Finals by surface Hard (11–13) Clay (3–3) Grass (0–0) Carpet (0–0)

Result	W–L	Date	Tournament	Tier	Surface	Opponent	Score
Loss	0–1	Sep 2009	Bolivia F3, La Paz	Futures	Clay	(Argentina) Facundo Bagnis	3–6, 2–6
Loss	0–2	Dec 2009	Dominican Republic F2, Santo Domingo	Futures	Hard	(Dominican Republic) Víctor Estrella Burgos	6–7^{(4–7)}, 3–6
Loss	0–3	May 2010	Mexico F4, Celaya	Futures	Hard	(Mexico) Víctor Romero	6–4, 3–6, 2–6
Win	1–3	Jul 2010	USA F17, Pittsburgh	Futures	Clay	(United States) Rhyne Williams	6–3, 7–6^{(8–6)}
Loss	1–4	Sep 2010	Mexico F7, Guadalajara	Futures	Hard	(Canada) Vasek Pospisil	0–6, 1–6
Win	2–4	Sep 2010	Bolivia F1, Tarija	Futures	Clay	(Argentina) Diego Schwartzman	7–6^{(7–4)}, 6–1
Loss	2–5	Sep 2010	Bolivia F2, La Paz	Futures	Clay	(Argentina) Guillermo Carry	2–6, 2–4 ret.
Loss	2–6	Dec 2010	Mexico F11, Chiapas	Futures	Hard	(Australia) Mark Verryth	7–5, 2–6, 0–6
Loss	2–7	Aug 2011	Mexico F8, Leon	Futures	Hard	(Uruguay) Marcel Felder	2–6, 3–6
Loss	2–8	Oct 2011	Mexico F13, Monterrey	Futures	Hard	(Guatemala) Christopher Díaz Figueroa	3–6, 6–3, 1–6
Loss	2–9	Feb 2012	Guatemala F1, Guatemala City	Futures	Hard	(United States) Michael Shabaz	1–6, 4–6
Loss	2–10	Apr 2012	Mexico F3, Córdoba	Futures	Hard	(United Kingdom) Jamie Baker	3–6, 2–6
Loss	2–11	May 2012	Mexico F6, Guadalajara	Futures	Hard	(France) Antoine Benneteau	7–6^{(7–4)}, 3–6, 5–7
Win	3–11	May 2012	Mexico F7, Morelia	Futures	Hard	(France) Antoine Benneteau	7–5, 6–1
Loss	3–12	Jun 2012	Japan F5, Karuizawa	Futures	Clay	(South Korea) Nam Ji-sung	4–6, 4–6
Win	4–12	Sep 2012	Mexico F10, Manzanillo	Futures	Hard	(El Salvador) Marcelo Arévalo	7–6^{(7–2)}, 6–2
Loss	4–13	May 2013	Mexico F8, Puebla	Futures	Hard	(Mexico) M-A Reyes-Varela	6–7^{(5–7)}, 6–1, 3–6
Win	5–13	Oct 2013	Turkey F42, Antalya	Futures	Hard	(Netherlands) Matwé Middelkoop	2–1 ret.
Win	6–13	Apr 2014	Mexico F1, Querétaro	Futures	Hard	(United States) Nicolas Meister	7–5, 6–4
Loss	6–14	May 2014	Mexico F2, Córdoba	Futures	Hard	(United States) Kevin King	2–6, 5–7
Win	7–14	Sep 2014	Mexico F11, Tehuacan	Futures	Hard	(United States) Evan Song	6–2, 6–2
Win	8–14	Oct 2014	USA F27, Houston	Futures	Hard	(Germany) Lukas Finzelberg	6–1, 2–6, 6–4
Loss	8–15	May 2016	Mexico F1, Córdoba	Futures	Hard	(Barbados) Darian King	1–6, 4–6
Win	9–15	May 2016	Mexico F3, Mexico City	Futures	Hard	(United Kingdom) Farris Fathi Gosea	7–6^{(7–3)}, 6–3
Win	10–15	Jun 2016	Mexico F5, Zapopan	Futures	Clay	(Mexico) Luis Patino	6–3, 4–6, 6–2
Win	11–15	Jul 2016	Egypt F16, Sharm El Sheikh	Futures	Hard	(Zimbabwe) Benjamin Lock	6–2, 6–4
Loss	11–16	Aug 2016	Egypt F19, Sharm El Sheikh	Futures	Hard	(Czech Republic) Marek Jaloviec	6–7^{(3–7)}, 6–7^{(14–16)}
Win	12–16	Sep 2016	Canada F9, Niagara	Futures	Hard	(Canada) Brayden Schnur	4–6, 7–5, 6–4
Win	13–16	May 2018	Mexico F3, Córdoba	Futures	Hard	(Guatemala) Christopher Díaz Figueroa	3–6, 6–4, 7–5
Win	14–16	Sep 2019	M15 Cancún, Mexico	World Tennis Tour	Hard	(Colombia) Cristian Rodríguez	6–4, 6–7^{(2–7)}, 6–1

=== Doubles: 23 (12–11) ===
Legend ATP Challenger (0–1) ITF Futures (12–10)	Finals by surface Hard (9–7) Clay (3–4) Grass (0–0) Carpet (0–0)

Result	W–L	Date	Tournament	Tier	Surface	Partner	Opponents	Score
Loss	0–1	Mar 2008	USA F6, McAllen	Futures	Hard	(Belarus) Uladzimir Ignatik	(Lithuania) Ričardas Berankis (Belarus) Sergey Betov	3–6, 3–6
Loss	0–2	Jul 2008	USA F16, Pittsburgh	Futures	Clay	(United States) Rhyne Williams	(United States) Treat Huey (India) Somdev Devvarman	3–6, 2–6
Win	1–2	Jun 2009	Egypt F8, Ain Sokhna	Futures	Clay	(New Zealand) Mikal Statham	(Egypt) Sherif Sabry (Egypt) Karim Maamoun	6–1, 7–5
Loss	1–3	Jun 2009	Egypt F10, Giza	Futures	Clay	(New Zealand) Mikal Statham	(Egypt) Sherif Sabry (Egypt) Karim Maamoun	4–6, 3–6
Win	2–3	Nov 2009	USA F29, Amelia Island	Futures	Clay	(United States) Denis Zivkovic	(The Bahamas) Timothy Neilly (United States) Marcus Fugate	6–2, 3–6, [10–2]
Win	3–3	Nov 2009	Dominican Republic F1, Santo Domingo	Futures	Hard	(Austria) Nikolaus Moser	(Croatia) Marin Draganja (Croatia) Dino Marcan	7–5, 6–4
Win	4–3	Dec 2009	Dominican Republic F2, Santo Domingo	Futures	Hard	(United States) Blake Strode	(United Kingdom) Alexander Slabinsky (Israel) Amir Weintraub	6–3, 2–6, [10–7]
Loss	4–4	Sep 2010	Bolivia F1, Tarija	Futures	Clay	(Bolivia) Eduardo Kohlberg Ruiz	(Peru) Sergio Galdós (Peru) Mauricio Echazú	1–6, 4–6
Win	5–4	Dec 2010	Mexico F11, Chiapas	Futures	Hard	(United States) Ty Trombetta	(Bulgaria) Boris Nicola Bakalov (Austria) Rainer Eitzinger	6–4, 6–7^{(4–7)}, [10–7]
Loss	5–5	Jan 2011	Guatemala F1, Guatemala City	Futures	Hard	(Bulgaria) Boris Nicola Bakalov	(United States) Blake Strode (Zimbabwe) Takanyi Garanganga	5–7, 5–7
Loss	5–6	May 2011	Mexico F2, Córdoba	Futures	Hard	(Chinese Taipei) Jimmy Wang	(Australia) Chris Letcher (Australia) Brendan Moore	4–6, 3–6
Win	6–6	Oct 2011	Mexico F13, Monterrey	Futures	Hard	(Australia) Nima Roshan	(Mexico) Miguel Gallardo Valles (Italy) Claudio Grassi	6–2, 7–6^{(7–2)}
Win	7–6	Dec 2011	Mexico F14, Ixtapa	Futures	Hard	(Mexico) Luis Díaz Barriga	(Mexico) César Ramírez (Australia) Nima Roshan	6–4, 6–4
Win	8–6	Dec 2011	Mexico F16, Guadalajara	Futures	Clay	(Mexico) Luis Díaz Barriga	(Mexico) Bruno Rodríguez (Mexico) Manuel Sánchez	6–3, 6–3
Win	9–6	Sep 2012	Mexico F9, Manzanillo	Futures	Hard	(New Zealand) Marvin Barker	(Mexico) Luis Patino (Mexico) Mauricio Astorga	7–5, 6–1
Win	10–6	Sep 2012	Mexico F11, Manzanillo	Futures	Hard	(New Zealand) Marvin Barker	(Mexico) Luis Patino (Mexico) Mauricio Astorga	6–3, 6–4
Loss	10–7	Feb 2013	Mexico F2, Tijuana	Futures	Hard	(Australia) Chris Letcher	(Greece) Theodoros Angelinos (France) Antoine Benneteau	5–7, 4–6
Loss	10–8	Feb 2013	Mexico F3, Mexico City	Futures	Hard	(Moldova) Roman Borvanov	(Guatemala) Christopher Díaz Figueroa (Colombia) Nicolás Barrientos	5–7, 6–7^{(6–8)}
Loss	10–9	Mar 2013	Canada F1, Gatineau	Futures	Hard	(Canada) Peter Polansky	(Germany) Moritz Baumann (Germany) Tim Pütz	6–7^{(0–7)}, 1–6
Loss	10–10	Jul 2013	Granby, Canada	Challenger	Hard	(Croatia) Ante Pavić	(Canada) Érik Chvojka (Canada) Peter Polansky	4–6, 3–6
Win	11–10	Oct 2013	Turkey F39, Antalya	Futures	Hard	(Kazakhstan) Denis Yevseyev	(Moldova) Andrei Ciumac (Russia) Kirill Dmitriev	7–5, 6–3
Loss	11–11	Nov 2016	Colombia F8, Medellín	Futures	Clay	(Colombia) Juan Sebastián Gómez	(Brazil) Nicolas Santos (Brazil) Oscar Jose Gutierrez	4–6, 3–6
Win	12–11	Sep 2018	Thailand F2, Nonthaburi	Futures	Hard	(United States) Tyler Mercier	(Thailand) Nuttanon Kadchapanan (Thailand) Palaphoom Kovapitukted	4–6, 7–6^{(7–3)}, [10–5]
