= Alessandro Da Col =

Italian tennis player

- Country (sports): Italy
- Born: 11 March 1978 (age 48) Rimini, Italy
- Plays: Right-Handed
- Prize money: $73,116

Singles
- Career record: 0–0
- Career titles: 0
- Highest ranking: No. 396 (14 August 2006)

Doubles
- Career record: 0–0
- Career titles: 0
- Highest ranking: No. 213 (27 August 2007)

Alessandro Da Col (born 11 March 1978) is a retired Italian tennis player.

Da Col has a career-high ATP singles ranking of 396, achieved on 14 August 2006. He also has a career-high doubles ranking of 213, achieved on 27 August 2007.

He won two doubles titles at the ATP Challenger Tour.

== ATP Challenger and ITF Futures finals ==
=== Singles: 6 (4–2) ===
ATP Challenger (0–0)
ITF Futures (4–2)

| Result | W–L | Date | Tournament | Tier | Surface | Opponent | Score |
|---|---|---|---|---|---|---|---|
| Loss | 0–1 | Sep 2005 | Oristano, Italy | Futures | Hard | (Italy) Stefano Galvani | 3–6, 0–6 |
| Win | 1–1 | Oct 2005 | Córdoba, Spain | Futures | Hard | (Italy) Fabio Colangelo | 6–1, 2–6, 6–4 |
| Win | 2–1 | May 2006 | Brčko, Bosnia and Herzegovina | Futures | Clay | (Austria) Stefan Wiespeiner | 7–5, 2–6, 6–2 |
| Loss | 2–2 | Sep 2006 | Caldas Novas, Brazil | Futures | Hard | (Italy) Francesco Piccari | 5–7, 2–6 |
| Win | 3–2 | May 2007 | Piacenza, Italy | Futures | Clay | (Argentina) Antonio Pastorino | 3–6, 7–5, 1–0 ret. |
| Win | 4–2 | May 2008 | Edinburgh, United Kingdom | Futures | Clay | (Argentina) Diego Álvarez | 6–4, 6–1 |

=== Doubles: 42 (17–25) ===
ATP Challenger (2–3)
ITF Futures (15–22)

| Result | W–L | Date | Tournament | Tier | Surface | Partner | Opponents | Score |
|---|---|---|---|---|---|---|---|---|
| Loss | 0–1 | Aug 1998 | Forli, Italy | Futures | Clay | (Italy) Matteo Gotti | (Italy) Florian Allgauer (Italy) Igor Gaudi | 6–4, 5–7, 3–6 |
| Win | 1–1 | Nov 1999 | Nicosia, Cyprus | Futures | Clay | (Serbia and Montenegro) Jovan Savić | (Italy) Elia Grossi (Italy) Filippo Volandri | 3–6, 6–1, 7–6 |
| Win | 2–1 | Aug 2000 | Irun, Spain | Futures | Clay | (Spain) Ángel-José Martín-Arroyo | (Spain) Jordi Fernández-Rubio (Spain) Ferran Ventura-Martell | 4–5^{(3)}, 3–5, 5–4^{(1)}, 4–1, 4–1 |
| Loss | 2–2 | May 2001 | Tortoreto Lido, Italy | Futures | Clay | (Italy) Gianluca Bazzica | (Italy) Diego Álvarez (Italy) Nahuel Fracassi | 2–6, 3–6 |
| Win | 3–2 | May 2001 | Valdengo, Italy | Futures | Clay | (Italy) Matteo Colla | (Puerto Rico) Gabriel Montilla (Argentina) Juan-Mariano Perello | 6–1, 7–6^{(4)} |
| Win | 4–2 | Jul 2001 | Aix-les-Bains, France | Futures | Clay | (Italy) Giuseppe Menga | (India) Mustafa Ghouse (Netherlands) Fred Hemmes | 7–5, 6–2 |
| Loss | 0–1 | Aug 2001 | Manerbio, Italy | Challenger | Clay | (Italy) Andrea Stoppini | (Hungary) Attila Sávolt (Austria) Thomas Strengberger | 5–7, 5–7 |
| Win | 5–2 | Apr 2003 | Bergamo, Italy | Futures | Clay | (Italy) Andrea Stoppini | (Austria) Philipp Müllner (Austria) Herbert Wiltschnig | 6–1, 6–3 |
| Loss | 5–3 | May 2003 | Verona, Italy | Futures | Clay | (Italy) Christian Persico | (Italy) Gianluca Pazzica (Russia) Philipp Mukhometov | 4–6, 6–7^{(5)} |
| Loss | 5–4 | Jul 2003 | Alicante, Spain | Futures | Clay | (Italy) Francesco Aldi | (Spain) Guillermo García López (Spain) Santiago Ventura | 2–6, 5–7 |
| Loss | 5–5 | Sep 2003 | Madrid, Spain | Futures | Hard | (Italy) Giuseppe Menga | (Spain) Esteban Carril (Spain) Santiago Ventura | 0–6, 6–3, 3–6 |
| Loss | 5–6 | Nov 2003 | Frýdlant nad Ostravicí, Czech Republic | Futures | Hard | (Italy) Flavio Cipolla | (Belgium) Steve Darcis (Netherlands) Bart de Gier | 6–7^{(5)}, 7–6^{(4)}, 3–6 |
| Win | 6–6 | Apr 2004 | Monza, Italy | Futures | Clay | (Italy) Stefano Mocci | (Czech Republic) Dušan Karol (Czech Republic) Jan Mertl | 6–3, 6–3 |
| Win | 7–6 | May 2004 | Pavia, Italy | Futures | Clay | (Italy) Fabio Colangelo | (Italy) Giancarlo Petrazzuolo (Italy) Federico Torresi | 6–3, 5–7, 6–4 |
| Loss | 7–7 | Jun 2004 | Bassano del Grappa, Italy | Futures | Clay | (Italy) Francesco Piccari | (Italy) Alessandro Motti (Italy) Giancarlo Petrazzuolo | 0–1 ret. |
| Loss | 7–8 | Feb 2005 | Trento, Italy | Futures | Hard (i) | (Italy) Fabio Colangelo | (Italy) Stefano Galvani (Italy) Daniele Giorgini | 7–6^{(3)}, 3–6, 1–6 |
| Loss | 7–9 | Apr 2005 | Cremona, Italy | Futures | Hard | (Italy) Fabio Colangelo | (Austria) Max Raditschnigg (Germany) Alexander Satschko | 6–7^{(8)}, 4–6 |
| Loss | 7–10 | Jun 2005 | Kranj, Slovenia | Futures | Clay | (Italy) Fabio Colangelo | (Slovenia) Rok Jarc (Slovenia) Grega Žemlja | 6–2, 6–7^{(6)}, 3–6 |
| Loss | 7–11 | Jul 2005 | Carpi, Italy | Futures | Clay | (Italy) Marco Crugnola | (Spain) Alberto Soriano-Maldonado (Czech Republic) Adam Vejmělka | 3–6, 6–2, 5–7 |
| Win | 8–11 | Aug 2005 | Avezzano, Italy | Futures | Clay | (Italy) Fabio Colangelo | (Spain) Daniel Monedero-Gonzalez (Spain) Carles Poch Gradin | 4–6, 7–6^{(3)}, 7–6^{(3)} |
| Win | 9–11 | Aug 2005 | Kaposvár, Hungary | Futures | Clay | (Czech Republic) Lukáš Rosol | (Spain) José-Carlos García-Sánchez (Spain) Miguel Pérez Puigdomenech | 7–5, 4–6, 6–4 |
| Loss | 9–12 | Sep 2005 | Szolnok, Hungary | Futures | Clay | (Czech Republic) Lukáš Rosol | (Hungary) Kornél Bardóczky (Hungary) Gergely Kisgyörgy | 2–6, 1–6 |
| Win | 10–11 | Sep 2005 | Como, Italy | Futures | Clay | (Italy) Marco Crugnola | (Italy) Luca Bonati (Italy) Giancarlo Petrazzuolo | 6–4, 6–4 |
| Loss | 10–12 | Sep 2005 | Oristano, Italy | Futures | Hard | (Italy) Fabio Colangelo | (Italy) Stefano Galvani (Bosnia and Herzegovina) Ismar Gorčić | 6–7^{(8)}, 6–7^{(5)} |
| Win | 11–12 | Oct 2005 | Córdoba, Spain | Futures | Hard | (Italy) Fabio Colangelo | (Spain) Antonio Ochoa-Collado (Spain) Alejandro Vargas-García | 6–4, 6–4 |
| Win | 12–12 | Jan 2006 | Deauville, France | Futures | Clay (i) | (Italy) Marco Crugnola | (France) Julien Jeanpierre (France) Nicolas Renavand | 7–6^{(5)}, 4–6, 7–5 |
| Win | 13–12 | Feb 2006 | Bari, Italy | Futures | Clay (i) | (Italy) Marco Crugnola | (Italy) Daniele Giorgini (Italy) Giancarlo Petrazzuolo | 6–3, 6–3 |
| Win | 14–12 | Mar 2006 | Faro, Portugal | Futures | Hard | (Spain) Marcel Granollers | (Netherlands) Bart Beks (Italy) Matwé Middelkoop | 6–4, 3–6, 6–2 |
| Loss | 14–13 | May 2006 | Piacenza, Italy | Futures | Clay | (Italy) Giuseppe Menga | (Italy) Daniele Giorgini (France) Ludwig Pellerin | 6–7^{(8)}, 6–7^{(7)} |
| Loss | 14–14 | Jun 2006 | L'Aquila, Italy | Futures | Clay | (Bosnia and Herzegovina) Ismar Gorčić | (Italy) Fabio Colangelo (Italy) Daniele Giorgini | 3–6, 2–6 |
| Loss | 14–15 | Jul 2006 | Saint-Gervais, France | Futures | Clay | (Italy) Luca Bonati | (France) Patrice Atias (France) Jonathan Eysseric | 1–6, 6–7^{(3)} |
| Loss | 0–2 | Sep 2006 | Belém, Brazil | Challenger | Clay | (Italy) Francesco Piccari | (Argentina) Brian Dabul (Argentina) Cristian Villagrán | 1–6, 6–7^{(5)} |
| Loss | 14–16 | Nov 2006 | Redbridge, United Kingdom | Futures | Hard (i) | (Italy) Francesco Piccari | (United Kingdom) Neil Bamford (United Kingdom) Jim May | 3–6, 2–6 |
| Loss | 14–17 | Nov 2006 | Sunderland, United Kingdom | Futures | Hard (i) | (Italy) Francesco Piccari | (United Kingdom) Neil Bamford (United Kingdom) Jim May | 3–6, 7–6^{(5)}, 6–7^{(3)} |
| Loss | 14–18 | Feb 2007 | Cartagena, Spain | Futures | Clay | (Italy) Enrico Burzi | (Serbia) David Savić (Argentina) Juan-Pablo Yunis | w/o |
| Loss | 14–19 | Feb 2007 | Cartagena, Spain | Futures | Hard | (Spain) Abel Hernández-García | (Belgium) Ruben Bemelmans (Belgium) Yannick Mertens | 6–7^{(2)}, 2–6 |
| Loss | 14–20 | Jun 2007 | Cesena, Italy | Futures | Clay | (Italy) Francesco Piccari | (Argentina) Eduardo Schwank (Argentina) Cristian Villagrán | 3–6, 2–6 |
| Loss | 0–3 | Jun 2007 | Milan, Italy | Challenger | Clay | (Italy) Manuel Jorquera | (Italy) Fabio Colangelo (Uruguay) Martín Vilarrubí | 7–6^{(2)}, 6–7^{(8)}, [8–10] |
| Win | 1–3 | Aug 2007 | Cordenons, Italy | Challenger | Clay | (Italy) Andrea Stoppini | (Italy) Alberto Brizzi (Italy) Marco Pedrini | 6–3, 7–6^{(5)} |
| Win | 15–20 | Sep 2007 | Olbia, Italy | Futures | Clay | (Italy) Andrea Stoppini | (Italy) Leonardo Azzaro (Italy) Daniele Giorgini | 6–3, 6–2 |
| Loss | 15–21 | Jan 2008 | Albufeira, Portugal | Futures | Hard | (Italy) Marco Pedrini | (Sweden) Robert Gustafsson (Sweden) Rickard Holmström | 3–6, 6–7^{(3)} |
| Win | 2–3 | Jul 2008 | Lexington, United States | Challenger | Hard | (Italy) Andrea Stoppini | (France) Olivier Charroin (Canada) Erik Chvojka | 6–2, 2–6, [10–8] |
| Loss | 15–22 | Aug 2008 | Este-Padova, Italy | Futures | Clay | (Italy) Luca Vanni | (Croatia) Luka Belić (Croatia) Marin Bradarić | 7–6^{(6)}, 6–7^{(3)}, [7–10] |
