= Bruno Agostinelli =

Canadian tennis player (1987–2016)

- Full name: Bruno Agostinelli Jr.
- Country (sports): Canada
- Born: 1 April 1987 Niagara Falls, Ontario, Canada
- Died: 9 March 2016 (aged 28) Toronto, Ontario, Canada
- Plays: Right-handed
- Prize money: $11,795

Singles
- Career record: 1-2
- Career titles: 0
- Highest ranking: No. 978 (14 June 2010)

Doubles
- Highest ranking: No. 870 (5 July 2010)

Bruno Agostinelli Jr. (1 April 1987 – 9 March 2016) was a Canadian Davis Cup tennis player.

== See also ==
- List of Canada Davis Cup team representatives
