= Kimberly Couts =

American tennis player

- Country (sports): United States
- Residence: Bradenton, Florida, U.S.
- Born: May 9, 1989 (age 36) Princeton, New Jersey, U.S.
- Height: 5 ft 7 in (1.70 m)
- Turned pro: 2004
- Retired: 2012
- Plays: Right-handed (two-handed backhand)
- Prize money: US$ 77,197

Singles
- Career record: 102-110
- Career titles: 1 ITF
- Highest ranking: No. 259 (April 20, 2009)

Grand Slam singles results
- US Open: Q1 (2008)

Doubles
- Career record: 92-80
- Career titles: 6 ITF
- Highest ranking: No. 157 (July 12, 2010)

Kimberly Couts (born May 9, 1989) is an American former professional tennis player.

On 20 April 2009, she reached her career-high singles ranking of world No. 259. On 12 July 2010, she achieved her best WTA doubles ranking of 157.

Kimberly played her last match before retirement at an ITF event in Florida, in May 2011.

== ITF finals ==
$50,000 tournaments
$25,000 tournaments
$10,000 tournaments

=== Singles (1–0) ===
Result	No.	Date	Tournament	Surface	Opponent	Score
Win	1.	29 July 2007	ITF Evansville, United States	Hard	(Bosnia and Herzegovina) Helena Bešović	7–6^{(3)}, 7–5

=== Doubles (6–8) ===
Result	No.	Date	Tournament	Surface	Partner	Opponents	Score
Loss	1.	29 May 2007	ITF Houston, United States	Hard	(United States) Christina McHale	(Bosnia and Herzegovina) Helena Bešović (Norway) Nina Munch-Søgaard	6–7^{(2)}, 5–7
Loss	2.	28 April 2008	Charlottesville Open, United States	Clay	(United States) Anna Tatishvili	(United States) Raquel Kops-Jones (United States) Abigail Spears	1–6, 3–6
Win	3.	12 May 2008	ITF Raleigh, United States	Clay	(United States) Anna Tatishvili	(Switzerland) Stefania Boffa (Austria) Nicole Rottmann	6–3, 6–4
Loss	4.	26 May 2008	Carson Challenger, United States	Clay	(United States) Anna Tatishvili	(Indonesia) Romana Tedjakusuma (United States) Story Tweedie-Yates	6–7^{(10)}, 6–4, [7–10]
Win	5.	21 July 2008	Lexington Challenger, United States	Hard	(Chinese Taipei) Chan Chin-wei	(United States) Melanie Oudin (United States) Lindsay Lee-Waters	2–6, 6–3 [10–8]
Loss	6.	18 January 2009	ITF Boca Raton, United States	Clay	(Canada) Sharon Fichman	(Russia) Alina Jidkova (Belarus) Darya Kustova	4–6, 2–6
Win	7.	24 January 2009	ITF Lutz, United States	Clay	(Canada) Sharon Fichman	(United States) Story Tweedie-Yates (United States) Mashona Washington	6–4, 7–5
Loss	8.	12 July 2009	ITF Grapevine, United States	Hard	(Canada) Valérie Tétreault	(United States) Lindsay Lee-Waters (United States) Riza Zalameda	6–7^{(5)}, 3–6
Loss	9.	28 September 2009	Las Vegas Open, United States	Hard	(United States) Lindsay Lee-Waters	(Hungary) Anikó Kapros (Argentina) Agustina Lepore	2–6, 5–7
Win	10.	1 November 2009	ITF Bayamón, Puerto Rico	Hard	(Canada) Heidi El Tabakh	(Bolivia) María Fernanda Álvarez Terán (Colombia) Karen Castiblanco	6–3, 6–1
Win	11.	27 June 2010	Boston Challenger, United States	Hard	(United States) Tetiana Luzhanska	(United States) Lindsay Lee-Waters (United States) Megan Moulton-Levy	6–4, 3–6, [10–8]
Loss	12.	5 July 2010	ITF Grapevine, United States	Hard	(United States) Tetiana Luzhanska	(United States) Lindsay Lee-Waters (United States) Megan Moulton-Levy	2–6, 5–7
Win	13.	13 March 2011	ITF Clearwater, United States	Hard	(Latvia) Līga Dekmeijere	(Canada) Heidi El Tabakh (Australia) Arina Rodionova	6–1, 6–4
Loss	14.	2 April 2011	ITF Pelham, United States	Clay	(Canada) Heidi El Tabakh	(Latvia) Līga Dekmeijere (Canada) Marie-Ève Pelletier	6–2, 4–6, [10–12]
