= Érik Chvojka =

Canadian tennis player

- Country (sports): Canada
- Residence: Montreal, Canada
- Born: October 26, 1986 (age 38); Montreal, Canada
- Height: 1.85 m (6 ft 1 in)
- Turned pro: 2004
- Retired: 2014
- Plays: Left-handed (unknown backhand)
- Prize money: US$163,316

Singles
- Career record: 0–2
- Career titles: 0
- Highest ranking: No. 204 (August 27, 2012)

Grand Slam singles results
- Australian Open: Q1 (2012, 2013)
- French Open: Q1 (2012)
- Wimbledon: Q3 (2012)
- US Open: Q1 (2012)

Doubles
- Career record: 0–1
- Career titles: 0
- Highest ranking: No. 266 (August 26, 2013)
- Last updated on: October 26, 2022.

Érik Chvojka (born October 26, 1986) is a Canadian former professional tennis player.

Chvojka's first ATP World Tour main-draw singles appearance was a close three-set loss in the first round of the 2011 Rogers Cup to world No. 21 Alexandr Dolgopolov. Chvojka has also made the main draw of the 2012 BRD Năstase Țiriac Trophy in Romania as a lucky loser, but lost to Cedrik-Marcel Stebe in the first round.

== ATP Challenger Tour and ITF Futures finals ==
=== Singles: 13 (6–7) ===
Legend (singles) ATP Challenger Tour (0–1) ITF Futures Tour (6–6)	Finals by surface Hard (6–4) Clay (0–3) Grass (0–0) Carpet (0–0)

Result	W–L	Date	Tournament	Tier	Surface	Opponent	Score
Win	1–0	Oct 2007	Mexico F10, Ciudad Obregón	Futures	Hard	(Spain) Ignacio Coll Riudavets	1–6, 7–6^{(9–7)}, 6–4
Win	2–0	Mar 2008	Canada F1, Gatineau	Futures	Hard (i)	(United States) Michael Yani	6–4, 6–2
Win	3–0	Jun 2008	Germany F6, Ingolstadt	Futures	Hard	(Belgium) Jeroen Masson	6–1, 5–7, 6–1
Win	4–0	Nov 2010	Australia F10, Kalgoorlie	Futures	Hard	(Australia) Brydan Klein	3–6, 6–3, 7–6^{(7–4)}
Loss	4–1	Apr 2011	Australia F3, Ipswich	Futures	Clay	(Australia) James Lemke	2–6, 0–6
Loss	4–2	Apr 2011	Australia F4, Bundaberg	Futures	Clay	(Australia) James Lemke	2–6, 4–6
Loss	4–3	May 2011	Sweden F1, Karlskrona	Futures	Clay	(Sweden) Ervin Eleskovic	6–7^{(4–7)}, 1–6
Loss	4–4	Jul 2011	Canada F4, Saskatoon	Futures	Hard	(Canada) Vasek Pospisil	5–7, 2–6
Loss	4–5	Oct 2011	Turkey F27, Antalya	Futures	Hard	(Czech Republic) Michel Konecny	3–6, 4–6
Win	5–5	Oct 2011	Turkey F28, Adana	Futures	Hard	(Sweden) Daniel Berta	6–3, 6–1
Win	6–5	Feb 2012	Australia F1, Toowoomba	Futures	Hard	(China) Zhang Ze	6–2, 1–6, 7–6^{(7–4)}
Loss	6–6	Jul 2012	Lexington, United States	Challenger	Hard	(United States) Denis Kudla	7–5, 5–7, 1–6
Loss	6–7	Oct 2012	Sweden F7, Jönköping	Futures	Hard (i)	(Sweden) Andreas Vinciguerra	4–6, 6–7^{(3–7)}

=== Doubles: 33 (16–17) ===
Legend (doubles) ATP Challenger Tour (1–1) ITF Futures Tour (15–16)	Finals by surface Hard (12–9) Clay (3–8) Grass (1–0) Carpet (0–0)

Result	W–L	Date	Tournament	Tier	Surface	Partner	Opponents	Score
Win	1-0	Oct 2005	USA F25, Laguna Niguel	Futures	Hard	(Canada) Philip Gubenco	(United States) Lester Cook (Canada) Rob Steckley	7–6^{(7–4)}, 4–6, 6–1
Win	2-0	Mar 2006	Canada F2, Rock Forest	Futures	Hard (i)	(Canada) Philip Gubenco	(South Africa) Izak van der Merwe (United States) Jeremy Wurtzman	7–5, 6–4
Win	3-0	Mar 2006	Canada F3, Montreal	Futures	Hard (i)	(Canada) Philip Gubenco	(Canada) Pierre-Ludovic Duclos (South Africa) Izak van der Merwe	7–6^{(7–3)}, 4–6, 7–6^{(7–5)}
Win	4-0	Mar 2007	Canada F3, Rock Forest	Futures	Hard (i)	(Canada) Vasek Pospisil	(Austria) Christoph Palmanshofer (United States) Jason Zimmermann	7–5, 6–3
Loss	4-1	May 2007	Czech Republic F3, Jablonec nad Nisou	Futures	Clay	(Mexico) Bruno Rodríguez	(Czech Republic) Jan Masik (Czech Republic) Jaroslav Pospíšil	5–7, 5–7
Loss	4-2	Jun 2007	Germany F5, Ingolstadt	Futures	Clay	(Czech Republic) Filip Zeman	(Czech Republic) Jaroslav Pospíšil (Austria) Martin Slanar	5–7, 4–6
Loss	4-3	Jun 2007	Germany F6, Marburg	Futures	Clay	(Germany) Philipp Piyamongkol	(Hungary) Kornél Bardóczky (Hungary) Denes Lukacs	5–7, 7–5, 4–6
Loss	4-4	Dec 2007	Dominican Republic F2, Santo Domingo	Futures	Hard	(Czech Republic) Filip Zeman	(Romania) Petru-Alexandru Luncanu (Czech Republic) Daniel Lustig	5–7, 4–6
Win	5-4	Jan 2008	Portugal F1, Albufeira	Futures	Hard	(Ukraine) Denys Molchanov	(Netherlands) Bas van der Valk (Netherlands) Boy Westerhof	6–4, 5–7, [14–10]
Loss	5-5	May 2008	Czech Republic F1, Teplice	Futures	Clay	(Canada) Vasek Pospisil	(Czech Republic) Filip Zema] (Czech Republic) Roman Jebavý	4–6, 7–6^{(8–6)}, [8–10]
Win	6-5	May 2008	Czech Republic F3, Jablonec nad Nisou	Futures	Hard	(Czech Republic) Jaroslav Pospíšil	(United States) James Ludlow (Republic of Ireland) Colin O'Brien	6–4, 6–3
Win	7-5	Jun 2008	Germany F6, Ingolstadt	Futures	Clay	(Switzerland) Alexander Sadecky	(South Africa) Damian Hume (Germany) Jean Zietsman	7–5, 6–4
Loss	7-6	Jul 2008	Lexington, USA	Challenger	Hard	(France) Olivier Charroin	(Italy) Alessandro da Col (Italy) Andreas Stoppini	2–6, 6–2, [8–10]
Loss	7-7	Feb 2009	Croatia F2, Zagreb	Futures	Hard	(Canada) Milos Raonic	(Romania) Victor Ioniță (Russia) Denis Matsukevich	4–6, 5–7
Loss	7-8	Mar 2009	Canada F1, Gatineau	Futures	Hard	(Australia) Kaden Hensel	(Belgium) Frederic de Fays (Belgium) Germain Gigounon	7–5, 1–6, [4–10]
Loss	7-9	Mar 2009	Canada F3, Sherbrooke	Futures	Hard	(Slovakia) Michal Pazicky	(Canada) Daniel Chu (Canada) Adil Shamasdin	6–4, 6–7^{(5–7)}, [7–10]
Loss	7-10	Jun 2009	Germany F7, Trier	Futures	Clay	(Germany) Patrick Taubert	(Jamaica) Dustin Brown (Germany) Kevin Deden	6–4, 3–6, [6–10]
Win	8-10	Jul 2009	Germany F9, Römerberg	Futures	Clay	(Czech Republic) Roman Jebavý	(Germany) Kevin Deden (Germany) Martin Emmrich	6–4, 3–6, [10–4]
Loss	8-11	Oct 2010	Australia F8, Port Pirie	Futures	Hard	(New Zealand) Mikal Statham	(Australia) Jared Easton (Australia) Joel Lindner	4–6, 2–6
Win	9-11	Feb 2011	Australia F1, Mildura	Futures	Grass	(Australia) Sadik Kadir	(Australia) Matthew Barton (Australia) Colin Ebelthite	4–6, 6–4, [10–7]
Loss	9-12	Apr 2011	Australia F4, Bundaberg	Futures	Clay	(New Zealand) José Statham	(Australia) Matt Reid (Australia) Michael Venus	6–2, 2–6, [4–10]
Loss	9-13	Jun 2011	Poland F4, Bytom	Futures	Clay	(Czech Republic) Roman Jebavý	(Poland) Andriej Kapaś (Poland) Błażej Koniusz	5–7, 4–6
Win	10-13	Jul 2011	Canada F4, Saskatoon	Futures	Hard	(Australia) Chris Letcher	(United States) Peter Aarts (Canada) Kamil Pajkowski	6–4, 6–2
Loss	10-14	Oct 2011	Turkey F26, Antalya	Futures	Hard	(Czech Republic) Michal Konecny	(United Kingdom) David Rice (United Kingdom) Sean Thornley	6–7^{(9–11)}, 3–6
Loss	10-15	May 2012	Czech Republic F2, Most	Futures	Clay	(Czech Republic) Marek Michalička	(Czech Republic) Jaroslav Pospíšil (Czech Republic) Jiří Veselý	1–6, 4–6
Win	11-15	Jul 2012	Canada F3, Kelowna	Futures	Hard	(United States) Greg Ouellette	(Canada) Philip Bester (Canada) Kamil Pajkowski	6–7^{(8–10)}, 6–4, [10–8]
Loss	11-16	Jul 2012	Canada F4, Saskatoon	Futures	Hard	(United States) Greg Ouellette	(United States) Nicolas Meister (Brazil) Pedro Zerbini	6–3, 4–6, [10–12]
Win	12-16	Apr 2013	Greece F2, Heraklion	Futures	Hard	(France) Mathieu Rodrigues	(Spain) José Checa Calvo (Slovakia) Adrian Sikora	6–1, 6–3
Win	13-16	Apr 2013	Greece F3, Heraklion	Futures	Hard	(Italy) Salvatore Caruso	(Belgium) Julien Cagnina (Belgium) Germain Gigounon	6–4, 6–2
Win	14-16	May 2013	Sweden F1, Karlskrona	Futures	Clay	(Sweden) Patrik Rosenholm	(Sweden) Christian Lindell (Sweden) Stefan Milenkovic	6–1, 6–1
Win	15-16	Jul 2013	Granby, Canada	Challenger	Hard	(Canada) Peter Polansky	(United States) Adam El Mihdawy (Croatia) Ante Pavić	6–4, 6–3
Loss	15-17	Sep 2013	Sweden F5, Stockholm	Futures	Hard	(Sweden) Lucas Renard	(Sweden) Isak Arvidsson (Finland) Micke Kontinen	5–7, 2–6
Win	16-17	Oct 2013	Sweden F7, Jönköping	Futures	Hard (i)	(Sweden) Patrik Rosenholm	(Sweden) Jesper Brunström (Sweden) Milos Sekulic	7–5, 6–1

== Personal ==
Chvojka speaks French, Czech, and English.
